= 1995 FIFA Women's World Cup Group C =

Football tournament group stage

Group C of the 1995 FIFA Women's World Cup took place from 6 to 10 June 1995. The group consisted of Australia, China PR, Denmark and United States.

== Standings ==
| Pos | Team | Pld | W | D | L | GF | GA | GD | Pts | Qualification |
|---|---|---|---|---|---|---|---|---|---|---|
| 1 | United States | 3 | 2 | 1 | 0 | 9 | 4 | +5 | 7 | Advance to knockout stage |
| 2 | China | 3 | 2 | 1 | 0 | 10 | 6 | +4 | 7 | Advance to knockout stage |
| 3 | Denmark | 3 | 1 | 0 | 2 | 6 | 5 | +1 | 3 | Advance to knockout stage |
| 4 | Australia | 3 | 0 | 0 | 3 | 3 | 13 | −10 | 0 | |

Source: FIFA
Rules for classification: Group stage tiebreakers

== Matches ==
All times listed are local, CEST (UTC+2).

=== United States vs China PR ===
6 June 1995
19:00

| United States | 3–3 | China |
|---|---|---|
| Venturini 22'; Milbrett 34'; Hamm 51' | Report | Wang Liping 38'; Wei Haiying 74'; Sun Wen 79' |

Strömvallen, Gävle
Attendance: 4,635
Referee: Ingrid Jonsson (Sweden)

| GK | 1 | Briana Scurry |
| DF | 4 | Carla Overbeck |
| DF | 8 | Linda Hamilton |
| DF | 14 | Joy Fawcett |
| MF | 5 | Tiffany Roberts |
| MF | 9 | Mia Hamm |
| MF | 11 | Julie Foudy |
| MF | 13 | Kristine Lilly |
| MF | 15 | Tisha Venturini |
| FW | 10 | Michelle Akers | (substituted off) 18' |
| FW | 12 | Carin Jennings |
Substitutions:
| FW | 16 | Tiffeny Milbrett | (substituted in) 18' | (substituted off) 76' |
| MF | 3 | Holly Manthei | | (substituted in) 76' |
Manager:
Tony DiCicco

| GK | 1 | Zhong Honglian |
| DF | 3 | Fan Yunjie |
| DF | 12 | Wen Lirong |
| DF | 13 | Niu Lijie |
| MF | 2 | Wang Liping | (yellow card) 3' |
| MF | 5 | Zhou Yang |
| MF | 11 | Sun Qingmei | | (substituted off) 84' |
| MF | 16 | Chen Yufeng | | (substituted off) 47' |
| MF | 17 | Zhao Lihong |
| FW | 9 | Sun Wen |
| FW | 15 | Shi Guihong | | (substituted off) 35' |
Substitutions:
| FW | 7 | Wei Haiying | | (substituted in) 35' |
| MF | 10 | Liu Ailing | | (substituted in) 47' |
| MF | 8 | Shui Qingxia | | (substituted in) 84' |
Manager:
Ma Yuanan

=== Denmark vs Australia ===
6 June 1995
19:00

| Denmark | 5–0 | Australia |
|---|---|---|
| Krogh 12', 48'; Eggers Nielsen 25'; Jensen 37'; C. Hansen 86' | Report |

Arosvallen, Västerås
Attendance: 1,500
Referee: Bente Skogvang (Norway)

| GK | 1 | Dorthe Larsen |
| DF | 3 | Kamma Flæng |
| DF | 4 | Lene Terp |
| DF | 5 | Katrine Pedersen | | (substituted off) 78' |
| DF | 6 | Rikke Holm |
| MF | 7 | Annette Laursen | (yellow card) 28' | (substituted off) 65' |
| MF | 9 | Helle Jensen |
| MF | 10 | Birgit Christensen |
| MF | 12 | Anne Dot Eggers Nielsen |
| FW | 11 | Gitte Krogh |
| FW | 14 | Lene Madsen | | (substituted off) 63' |
Substitutions:
| FW | 13 | Christina Hansen | | (substituted in) 63' |
| MF | 15 | Christina Bonde | | (substituted in) 65' |
| MF | 19 | Jeanne Axelsen | | (substituted in) 78' |
Manager:
Keld Gantzhorn

| GK | 1 | Tracey Wheeler |
| DF | 2 | Sarah Cooper |
| DF | 3 | Jane Oakley |
| DF | 6 | Anissa Tann |
| DF | 7 | Alison Forman | (yellow card) 25' |
| DF | 8 | Sonia Gegenhuber | (red card) 30' |
| MF | 4 | Julie Murray |
| MF | 5 | Cheryl Salisbury | (yellow card) 37' | (substituted off) 57' |
| FW | 10 | Sunni Hughes | | (substituted off) 57' |
| FW | 12 | Michelle Watson | (yellow card) 45' |
| FW | 16 | Lisa Casagrande | | (substituted off) 79' |
Substitutions:
| FW | 9 | Angela Iannotta | | (substituted in) 57' |
| MF | 15 | Kim Lembryk | | (substituted in) 57' |
| FW | 19 | Lizzy Claydon | | (substituted in) 79' |
Manager:
(Scotland) Tom Sermanni

=== United States vs Denmark ===
After U.S. goalkeeper Briana Scurry was sent off for handling the ball outside the penalty area in the 88th minute, and with no substitutions remaining, outfielder Mia Hamm took her place in goal.

8 June 1995
19:00

| United States | 2–0 | Denmark |
|---|---|---|
| Lilly 9'; Milbrett 49' | Report |

Strömvallen, Gävle
Attendance: 2,704
Referee: Engage Camara (Guinea)

| GK | 1 | Briana Scurry | (red card) 88' |
| DF | 4 | Carla Overbeck |
| DF | 8 | Linda Hamilton | | (substituted off) 53' |
| DF | 14 | Joy Fawcett |
| MF | 5 | Tiffany Roberts |
| MF | 9 | Mia Hamm | (yellow card) 29' |
| MF | 11 | Julie Foudy | (yellow card) 38' |
| MF | 13 | Kristine Lilly |
| MF | 15 | Tisha Venturini |
| FW | 12 | Carin Jennings | | (substituted off) 85' |
| FW | 16 | Tiffeny Milbrett | | (substituted off) 61' |
Substitutions:
| DF | 2 | Thori Staples | | (substituted in) 53' |
| FW | 6 | Debbie Keller | | (substituted in) 61' |
| FW | 7 | Sarah Rafanelli | | (substituted in) 85' |
Manager:
Tony DiCicco

| GK | 1 | Dorthe Larsen | (yellow card) 55' |
| DF | 3 | Kamma Flæng |
| DF | 4 | Lene Terp |
| DF | 5 | Katrine Pedersen |
| DF | 6 | Rikke Holm |
| MF | 7 | Annette Laursen | | (substituted off) 46' |
| MF | 9 | Helle Jensen |
| MF | 10 | Birgit Christensen |
| MF | 12 | Anne Dot Eggers Nielsen |
| FW | 11 | Gitte Krogh | | (substituted off) 53' |
| FW | 14 | Lene Madsen | | (substituted off) 61' |
Substitutions:
| MF | 19 | Jeanne Axelsen | | (substituted in) 46' |
| FW | 13 | Christina Hansen | | (substituted in) 53' |
| MF | 20 | Christina Petersen | (yellow card) 89' | (substituted in) 61' |
Manager:
Keld Gantzhorn

=== China PR vs Australia ===
8 June 1995
19:00

| China | 4–2 | Australia |
|---|---|---|
| Zhou Yang 23'; Shi Guihong 54', 78'; Liu Ailing 90+3' | Report | Iannotta 25'; Hughes 89' |

Arosvallen, Västerås
Attendance: 1,500
Referee: Maria Edilene Siqueira (Brazil)

| GK | 1 | Zhong Honglian |
| DF | 3 | Fan Yunjie |
| MF | 2 | Wang Liping |
| MF | 5 | Zhou Yang | (yellow card) 79' |
| MF | 8 | Shui Qingxia | | (substituted off) 27' |
| MF | 10 | Liu Ailing |
| MF | 14 | Xie Huilin |
| MF | 16 | Chen Yufeng | | (substituted off) 69' |
| MF | 17 | Zhao Lihong |
| FW | 9 | Sun Wen |
| FW | 15 | Shi Guihong |
Substitutions:
| FW | 7 | Wei Haiying | | (substituted in) 27' |
| DF | 12 | Wen Lirong | | (substituted in) 69' |
Manager:
Ma Yuanan

| GK | 1 | Tracey Wheeler |
| DF | 2 | Sarah Cooper |
| DF | 3 | Jane Oakley |
| DF | 6 | Anissa Tann |
| DF | 7 | Alison Forman |
| MF | 4 | Julie Murray | | (substituted off) 81' |
| MF | 5 | Cheryl Salisbury | (yellow card) 73' | (substituted off) 77' |
| MF | 15 | Kim Lembryk | (yellow card) 62' | (substituted off) 62' |
| FW | 9 | Angela Iannotta |
| FW | 10 | Sunni Hughes |
| FW | 12 | Michelle Watson | (yellow card) 83' |
Substitutions:
| FW | 16 | Lisa Casagrande | | (substituted in) 62' |
| FW | 19 | Lizzy Claydon | | (substituted in) 77' |
| MF | 14 | Denie Pentecost | | (substituted in) 81' |
Manager:
(Scotland) Tom Sermanni

=== United States vs Australia ===
10 June 1995
16:00

| United States | 4–1 | Australia |
|---|---|---|
| Foudy 69'; Fawcett 72'; Overbeck 90+2' (pen.); Keller 90+4' | Report | Casagrande 54' |

Olympia, Helsingborg
Attendance: 1,105
Referee: Pirom Un-prasert (Thailand)

| GK | 18 | Saskia Webber |
| DF | 2 | Thori Staples |
| DF | 4 | Carla Overbeck |
| DF | 8 | Linda Hamilton |
| DF | 14 | Joy Fawcett |
| MF | 3 | Holly Manthei | | (substituted off) 46' |
| MF | 9 | Mia Hamm |
| MF | 13 | Kristine Lilly |
| MF | 15 | Tisha Venturini | (yellow card) 55' |
| MF | 19 | Amanda Cromwell | | (substituted off) 61' |
| FW | 16 | Tiffeny Milbrett | | (substituted off) 78' |
Substitutions:
| FW | 12 | Carin Jennings | | (substituted in) 46' |
| MF | 11 | Julie Foudy | | (substituted in) 61' |
| FW | 6 | Debbie Keller | | (substituted in) 78' |
Manager:
Tony DiCicco

| GK | 1 | Tracey Wheeler |
| DF | 2 | Sarah Cooper |
| DF | 3 | Jane Oakley | | (substituted off) 75' |
| DF | 6 | Anissa Tann |
| DF | 7 | Alison Forman | (yellow card) 42' |
| DF | 8 | Sonia Gegenhuber |
| MF | 4 | Julie Murray | (yellow card) 88' |
| MF | 15 | Kim Lembryk | | (substituted off) 82' |
| FW | 9 | Angela Iannotta | (yellow card) 82' |
| FW | 10 | Sunni Hughes |
| FW | 16 | Lisa Casagrande | | (substituted off) 67' |
Substitutions:
| FW | 19 | Lizzy Claydon | | (substituted in) 67' |
| DF | 17 | Sacha Wainwright | | (substituted in) 75' |
| MF | 11 | Kaylene Janssen | | (substituted in) 82' |
Manager:
(Scotland) Tom Sermanni

=== China PR vs Denmark ===
10 June 1995
16:00

| China | 3–1 | Denmark |
|---|---|---|
| Shi Guihong 21'; Sun Wen 76'; Wei Haiying 90' | Report | Bonde 44' |

Arosvallen, Västerås
Attendance: 1,619
Referee: Eduardo Gamboa (Chile)

| GK | 20 | Gao Hong |
| DF | 3 | Fan Yunjie |
| DF | 12 | Wen Lirong |
| MF | 2 | Wang Liping |
| MF | 5 | Zhou Yang |
| MF | 10 | Liu Ailing |
| MF | 14 | Xie Huilin |
| MF | 17 | Zhao Lihong |
| FW | 7 | Wei Haiying |
| FW | 9 | Sun Wen |
| FW | 15 | Shi Guihong | (substituted off) 73' |
Substitutions:
| MF | 8 | Shui Qingxia | (substituted in) 73' |
Manager:
Ma Yuanan

| GK | 1 | Dorthe Larsen |
| DF | 4 | Lene Terp |
| DF | 5 | Katrine Pedersen | | (substituted off) 43' |
| DF | 6 | Rikke Holm |
| MF | 2 | Louise Hansen |
| MF | 9 | Helle Jensen | | (substituted off) 26' |
| MF | 10 | Birgit Christensen |
| MF | 12 | Anne Dot Eggers Nielsen | (yellow card) 56' |
| FW | 11 | Gitte Krogh |
| FW | 13 | Christina Hansen |
| FW | 14 | Lene Madsen | | (substituted off) 79' |
Substitutions:
| MF | 15 | Christina Bonde | | (substituted in) 26' |
| DF | 18 | Bettina Allentoft | | (substituted in) 43' |
| MF | 20 | Christina Petersen | | (substituted in) 79' |
Manager:
Keld Gantzhorn

== See also ==
- Australia at the FIFA Women's World Cup
- China at the FIFA Women's World Cup
- Denmark at the FIFA Women's World Cup
- United States at the FIFA Women's World Cup
