= 1995 FIFA Women's World Cup knockout stage =

Football tournament knockout stage

The knockout stage of the 1995 FIFA Women's World Cup was the second and final stage of the competition, following the group stage. It began on 13 June with the quarter-finals and ended on 18 June 1995 with the final match, held at the Råsunda Stadium in Solna. A total of eight teams (the top two teams from each group, along with the two best third-placed teams) advanced to the knockout stage to compete in a single-elimination style tournament.

All times listed are local, CEST (UTC+2).

== Format ==
In the knockout stage, if a match was level at the end of 90 minutes of normal playing time, extra time was played (two periods of 15 minutes each). If still tied after extra time, the match was decided by a penalty shoot-out to determine the winner.

The quarter-final match-ups depended on the two third-placed teams which qualified. FIFA set out the following schedule for the semi-finals:

- Match 23: Winner Match 19 v Winner Match 20
- Match 24: Winner Match 21 v Winner Match 22

The third place play-off match-up was:

- Match 25: Loser Match 23 v Loser Match 24

The final match-up was:

- Match 26: Winner Match 23 v Winner Match 24

=== Combinations of matches in the quarter-finals ===
In the quarter-finals, all matches were played on 13 June 1995. The specific match-ups and schedule depended on which two third-placed teams qualified for the quarter-finals:

Combination according to the two qualified teams

Third-placed teams qualify from groups			Match 19 Västerås 20:15	Match 20 Helsingborg 20:15	Match 21 Gävle 17:15	Match 22 Karlstad 17:15
A	B		1A v 3B	2A v 1C	3A v 1B	2B v 2C
A		C	1A v 2B	2A v 2C	3A v 1C	1B v 3C
	B	C	1A v 3B	2A v 1C	1B v 3C	2B v 2C

== Qualified teams ==
The top two placed teams from each of the three groups, plus the two best-placed third teams, qualified for the knockout stage.

Group	Winners	Runners-up	Third-placed teams (Best two qualified)
A	Germany	Sweden	Japan
B	Norway	England	—N/a
C	United States	China	Denmark

== Bracket ==
Quarter-finals
13 June – Västerås
Germany	3
England	0
13 June – Helsingborg
Sweden	1 (3)
China (p)	1 (4)
13 June – Gävle
Japan	0
United States	4
13 June – Karlstad
Norway	3
Denmark	1

Semi-finals
15 June – Helsingborg
Germany	1
China	0
15 June – Västerås
United States	0
Norway	1

Final
18 June – Solna
Germany	0
Norway	2
Third place play-off
17 June – Gävle
China	0
United States	2

== Quarter-finals ==
=== Japan vs United States ===
13 June 1995
17:15

Japan	0–4	United States
	Report	Lilly 8', 42'; Milbrett 45'; Venturini 80'

Strömvallen, Gävle
Attendance: 3,756
Referee: Eduardo Gamboa (Chile)

GK	1	Junko Ozawa
DF	2	Yumi Tomei
DF	3	Rie Yamaki	(yellow card) 72'
DF	4	Maki Haneta
DF	6	Kae Nishina
DF	12	Yumi Obe
MF	8	Asako Takakura
MF	9	Futaba Kioka
MF	11	Etsuko Handa		(substituted off) 46'
FW	10	Akemi Noda
FW	17	Tamaki Uchiyama
Substitutions:
MF	16	Nami Otake		(substituted on) 46'
Manager:
Tamotsu Suzuki

GK	1	Briana Scurry
DF	4	Carla Overbeck
DF	8	Linda Hamilton
DF	14	Joy Fawcett
MF	5	Tiffany Roberts	(yellow card) 47'
MF	9	Mia Hamm		(substituted off) 61'
MF	11	Julie Foudy
MF	13	Kristine Lilly		(substituted off) 68'
MF	15	Tisha Venturini		(substituted off) 80'
FW	12	Carin Jennings
FW	16	Tiffeny Milbrett
Substitutions:
FW	6	Debbie Keller		(substituted on) 61'
DF	2	Thori Staples		(substituted on) 68'
MF	19	Amanda Cromwell		(substituted on) 80'
Manager:
Tony DiCicco

=== Norway vs Denmark ===
13 June 1995
17:15

Norway	3–1	Denmark
Espeseth 21'; Medalen 64'; Riise 85'	Report	Krogh 86'

Tingvalla IP, Karlstad
Attendance: 4,655
Referee: Pirom Un-prasert (Thailand)

GK	1	Bente Nordby
DF	2	Tina Svensson
DF	3	Gro Espeseth
DF	13	Merete Myklebust
MF	4	Anne Nymark Andersen
MF	6	Hege Riise
MF	7	Tone Haugen
MF	8	Heidi Støre
FW	10	Linda Medalen	(yellow card) 23'
FW	11	Ann Kristin Aarønes		(substituted off) 76'
FW	16	Marianne Pettersen		(substituted off) 84'
Substitutions:
DF	19	Agnete Carlsen		(substituted on) 76'
FW	15	Randi Leinan		(substituted on) 84'
Manager:
Even Pellerud

GK	1	Dorthe Larsen
DF	3	Kamma Flæng
DF	4	Lene Terp
DF	5	Katrine Pedersen
DF	6	Rikke Holm	(yellow card) 90'
MF	2	Louise Hansen		(substituted off) 63'
MF	9	Helle Jensen
MF	10	Birgit Christensen
MF	12	Anne Dot Eggers Nielsen
MF	19	Jeanne Axelsen		(substituted off) 46'
FW	14	Lene Madsen		(substituted off) 86'
Substitutions:
FW	11	Gitte Krogh		(substituted on) 46'
MF	7	Annette Laursen		(substituted on) 63'
MF	15	Christina Bonde		(substituted on) 86'
Manager:
Keld Gantzhorn

=== Germany vs England ===
13 June 1995
20:15

Germany	3–0	England
Voss 41'; Meinert 55'; Mohr 82'	Report

Arosvallen, Västerås
Attendance: 2,317
Referee: Bente Skogvang (Norway)

GK	1	Manuela Goller
DF	2	Anouschka Bernhard
DF	4	Dagmar Pohlmann
DF	14	Sandra Minnert
MF	5	Ursula Lohn
MF	6	Maren Meinert	(substituted off) 85'
MF	7	Martina Voss
MF	8	Bettina Wiegmann
MF	10	Silvia Neid
FW	9	Heidi Mohr
FW	16	Birgit Prinz	(substituted off) 67'
Substitutions:
FW	11	Patricia Brocker	(substituted on) 67'
MF	18	Pia Wunderlich	(substituted on) 85'
Manager:
Gero Bisanz

GK	1	Pauline Cope
DF	3	Tina Mapes		(substituted off) 79'
DF	5	Clare Taylor		(substituted off) 87'
DF	11	Brenda Sempare	(yellow card) 70'
MF	6	Gillian Coultard		(substituted off) 46'
MF	7	Marieanne Spacey
MF	8	Debbie Bampton
MF	10	Karen Burke
MF	12	Kerry Davis
FW	9	Karen Farley
FW	14	Karen Walker
Substitutions:
MF	20	Becky Easton	(yellow card) 57'	(substituted on) 46'
DF	17	Louise Waller		(substituted on) 79'
DF	4	Samantha Britton		(substituted on) 87'
Manager:
Ted Copeland

=== Sweden vs China PR ===
13 June 1995
20:15

Sweden	1–1 (a.e.t.)	China
Kalte 90+3'	Report	Sun Qingmei 29'
Penalties
Andersson (penalty missed); Videkull (penalty scored); Pohjanen (penalty scored); Sundhage (penalty scored); Nessvold (penalty missed)	3–4	(penalty scored) Sun Wen; (penalty scored) Xie Huilin; (penalty scored) Chen Yufeng; (penalty scored) Shui Qingxia; (penalty missed) Liu Ailing

Olympia, Helsingborg
Attendance: 7,537
Referee: Sonia Denoncourt (Canada)

GK	1	Elisabeth Leidinge
DF	4	Pia Sundhage
DF	5	Kristin Bengtsson	(substituted off) 65'
MF	6	Anna Pohjanen
MF	7	Lena Videkull
MF	8	Susanne Hedberg
MF	9	Malin Andersson
MF	16	Eva Zeikfalvy	(substituted off) 46'
FW	10	Anneli Andelén	(substituted off) 71'
FW	11	Ulrika Kalte
FW	18	Helen Nilsson
Substitutions:
MF	14	Åsa Lönnqvist	(substituted on) 46'
DF	13	Annika Nessvold	(substituted on) 65'
MF	17	Malin Flink	(substituted on) 71'
Manager:
Bengt Simonsson

GK	20	Gao Hong
DF	3	Fan Yunjie
DF	12	Wen Lirong
MF	2	Wang Liping		(substituted off) 103'
MF	5	Zhou Yang
MF	10	Liu Ailing	(yellow card) 77'
MF	11	Sun Qingmei
MF	14	Xie Huilin	(yellow card) 22'
MF	17	Zhao Lihong		(substituted off) 119'
FW	9	Sun Wen
FW	15	Shi Guihong		(substituted off) 51'
Substitutions:
FW	7	Wei Haiying		(substituted on) 51'
MF	8	Shui Qingxia		(substituted on) 103'
MF	16	Chen Yufeng		(substituted on) 119'
Manager:
Ma Yuanan

== Semi-finals ==
=== United States vs Norway ===
15 June 1995
17:15

United States	0–1	Norway
	Report	Aarønes 10'

Arosvallen, Västerås
Attendance: 2,893
Referee: Alain Hamer (Luxembourg)

GK	1	Briana Scurry
DF	4	Carla Overbeck
DF	8	Linda Hamilton
DF	14	Joy Fawcett
MF	5	Tiffany Roberts	(substituted off) 53'
MF	9	Mia Hamm
MF	11	Julie Foudy
MF	13	Kristine Lilly
MF	15	Tisha Venturini
FW	10	Michelle Akers
FW	12	Carin Jennings
Substitutions:
FW	16	Tiffeny Milbrett	(substituted on) 53'
Manager:
Tony DiCicco

GK	1	Bente Nordby
DF	2	Tina Svensson	(yellow card) 6'
DF	3	Gro Espeseth
DF	5	Nina Nymark Andersen
DF	13	Merete Myklebust
MF	4	Anne Nymark Andersen
MF	6	Hege Riise
MF	7	Tone Haugen		(substituted off) 69'
MF	8	Heidi Støre	(yellow card) 22' (yellow-red card) 76'
FW	10	Linda Medalen
FW	11	Ann Kristin Aarønes
Substitutions:
FW	16	Marianne Pettersen		(substituted on) 69'
Manager:
Even Pellerud

=== Germany vs China PR ===
15 June 1995
20:15

Germany	1–0	China
Wiegmann 88'	Report

Olympia, Helsingborg
Attendance: 3,693
Referee: Petros Mathabela (South Africa)

GK	1	Manuela Goller
DF	2	Anouschka Bernhard
DF	3	Birgitt Austermühl
DF	4	Dagmar Pohlmann
MF	5	Ursula Lohn
MF	6	Maren Meinert
MF	7	Martina Voss
MF	8	Bettina Wiegmann
MF	10	Silvia Neid
FW	9	Heidi Mohr
FW	16	Birgit Prinz	(substituted off) 83'
Substitutions:
MF	18	Pia Wunderlich	(substituted on) 83'
Manager:
Gero Bisanz

GK	20	Gao Hong
DF	3	Fan Yunjie		(substituted off) 86'
DF	12	Wen Lirong	(yellow card) 52'
MF	2	Wang Liping
MF	5	Zhou Yang
MF	10	Liu Ailing
MF	11	Sun Qingmei
MF	14	Xie Huilin
MF	17	Zhao Lihong
FW	9	Sun Wen
FW	15	Shi Guihong	(yellow card) 65'
Substitutions:
MF	16	Chen Yufeng		(substituted on) 86'
Manager:
Ma Yuanan

== Third place play-off ==
17 June 1995
16:00

China	0–2	United States
	Report	Venturini 24'; Hamm 55'

Strömvallen, Gävle
Attendance: 4,335
Referee: Sonia Denoncourt (Canada)

GK	20	Gao Hong
DF	3	Fan Yunjie		(substituted off) 72'
DF	12	Wen Lirong
DF	13	Niu Lijie
MF	2	Wang Liping
MF	10	Liu Ailing
MF	11	Sun Qingmei
MF	14	Xie Huilin	(yellow card) 45'
MF	17	Zhao Lihong
FW	9	Sun Wen		(substituted off) 59'
FW	15	Shi Guihong
Substitutions:
FW	7	Wei Haiying		(substituted on) 59'
MF	16	Chen Yufeng		(substituted on) 72'
Manager:
Ma Yuanan

GK	1	Briana Scurry
DF	2	Thori Staples
DF	4	Carla Overbeck
DF	8	Linda Hamilton	(substituted off) 54'
DF	14	Joy Fawcett
MF	9	Mia Hamm
MF	11	Julie Foudy
MF	13	Kristine Lilly
MF	15	Tisha Venturini
FW	12	Carin Jennings	(substituted off) 80'
FW	16	Tiffeny Milbrett	(substituted off) 68'
Substitutions:
MF	5	Tiffany Roberts	(substituted on) 54'
FW	6	Debbie Keller	(substituted on) 68'
FW	7	Sarah Rafanelli	(substituted on) 80'
Manager:
Tony DiCicco

== Final ==
18 June 1995
18:00

Germany	0–2	Norway
	Report	Riise 37'; Pettersen 40'

Råsunda Stadium, Solna
Attendance: 17,158
Referee: Ingrid Jonsson (Sweden)

Germany	Norway

GK	1	Manuela Goller
SW	5	Ursula Lohn
CB	3	Birgitt Austermühl
CB	2	Anouschka Bernhard	(yellow card) 2'
DM	8	Bettina Wiegmann
RM	6	Maren Meinert		(substituted off) 86'
CM	10	Silvia Neid (c)
CM	7	Martina Voss
LM	4	Dagmar Pohlmann		(substituted off) 75'
CF	9	Heidi Mohr
CF	16	Birgit Prinz		(substituted off) 42'
Substitutions:
FW	11	Patricia Brocker		(substituted on) 42'
MF	18	Pia Wunderlich		(substituted on) 75'
MF	19	Sandra Smisek		(substituted on) 86'
Manager:
Gero Bisanz

GK	1	Bente Nordby
RB	2	Tina Svensson
CB	5	Nina Nymark Andersen
CB	3	Gro Espeseth (c)
LB	13	Merete Myklebust
DM	4	Anne Nymark Andersen	(yellow card) 22'
CM	6	Hege Riise
CM	7	Tone Haugen
RW	16	Marianne Pettersen
LW	11	Ann Kristin Aarønes	(yellow card) 70'
CF	10	Linda Medalen	(yellow card) 58'
Manager:
Even Pellerud

Assistant referees:
Gitte Holm (Denmark)
Maria Rodríguez (Mexico)
