= 1994–95 in Australian soccer =

Soccer in Australia
- Season: 1994–95

Men's soccer
- NSL Premiership: Melbourne Knights
- NSL Championship: Melbourne Knights
- NSL Cup: Melbourne Knights

The 1994–95 season was the 26th season of national competitive soccer in Australia and 112th overall.

== National teams ==
=== Men's senior ===
==== Results and fixtures ====
===== Friendlies =====
24 September 1994	Kuwait	0–0	Australia	Kuala Lumpur, Malaysia
		Report

29 September 1994	Japan	0–0	Australia	Tokyo, Japan
		Report		Stadium: Japan National Stadium; Attendance: 44,253

8 February 1995	Australia	0–0	Colombia	Brisbane, Australia
		Report		Stadium: Lang Park; Attendance: 13,212; Referee: John Fraser (Australia)

11 February 1995	Australia	0–1	Colombia	Sydney, Australia
		Report	Ricard 66'	Stadium: Sydney Football Stadium; Attendance: 15,000; Referee: Eugene Brazzale (Australia)

15 February 1995	Australia	2–1	Japan	Sydney, Australia
	Markovski 6'; Corica 41'	Report	Hasegawa 16'	Stadium: Sydney Football Stadium; Attendance: 4,541; Referee: Richard Lorenc (Australia)

18 June 1995	Australia	2–1	Ghana	Sydney, Australia
	T. Vidmar 5'; Arnold 37'	Report	Kumah 82'	Stadium: Sydney Football Stadium; Attendance: 18,446; Referee: Simon Micallef (Australia)

21 June 1995	Australia	1–0	Ghana	Adelaide, Australia
	Veart 19'	Report		Stadium: Hindmarsh Stadium; Attendance: 7,000; Referee: Gerry Connelly (Australia)

24 June 1995	Australia	0–1	Ghana	Perth, Australia
		Report	Yahya 32'	Stadium: WACA Ground; Attendance: 11,634; Referee: Eddie Lennie (Australia)

30 June 1995	Argentina	2–0	Australia	Quilmes, Argentina
	Balbo 7'; Batistuta 89'	Report		Stadium: Estadio Centenario; Attendance: 11,634; Referee: Eddie Lennie (Australia)

=== Women's senior ===
==== Results and fixtures ====
===== Friendlies =====
27 August 1994	Russia	0–3	Australia	Samara, Russia
		Report	Foreman ?'; Hughes ?'; Wainwright ?'

27 September 1994	Japan	2–2	Australia	Tokyo, Japan
		Report	Tann ?'; Hughes 41'	Stadium: Japan National Stadium

20 January 1995	United States	5–0	Australia	Phoenix, United States
	Akers-Stahl ?', ?'; (unknown) ?', ?', ?'	Report

23 January 1995	United States	4–1	Australia	Phoenix, United States
	(unknown) ?', ?', ?', ?'	Report	Hughes 22'

11 May 1995	Canada	3–0	Australia	Vancouver, Canada
	(unknown) ?', ?', ?'	Report

13 May 1995	Canada	0–3	Australia	Vancouver, Canada
		Report	Salisbury 10'; Forman 39'; Ianotta 76'

17 May 1995	Scotland	0–0	Australia	Kilmarnock, Scotland
		Report		Stadium: Rugby Park

27 May 1995	Sweden	5–0	Australia	Helsingborg, Sweden
	(unknown) ?', ?', ?', ?', ?'	Report		Stadium: Rugby Park

===== 1995 FIFA Women's World Cup =====
====== Group C ======
Pos	Team	Pld	W	D	L	GF	GA	GD	Pts	Qualification
1	United States	3	2	1	0	9	4	+5	7	Advance to knockout stage
2	China	3	2	1	0	10	6	+4	7	Advance to knockout stage
3	Denmark	3	1	0	2	6	5	+1	3	Advance to knockout stage
4	Australia	3	0	0	3	3	13	−10	0	

Source: FIFA
Rules for classification: Group stage tiebreakers

6 June 1995	Denmark	5–0	Australia	Västerås, Sweden
	Krogh 12', 48'; Nielsen 25'; Jensen 37'; Hansen 86'	Report		Stadium: Arosvallen; Attendance: 1,500; Referee: Bente Skogvang (Norway)

8 June 1995	China	4–2	Australia	Västerås, Sweden
	Yang 23'; Guihong 54', 78'; Ailing 90+3'	Report	Iannotta 25'; Hughes 89'	Stadium: Arosvallen; Attendance: 1,500; Referee: Maria Edilene Siqueira (Brazil)

10 June 1995	United States	4–1	Australia	Helsingborg, Sweden
	Foudy 69'; Fawcett 72'; Overbeck 90+2' (pen.); Keller 90+4'	Report	Casagrande 54'	Stadium: Olympia; Attendance: 1,105; Referee: Pirom Un-prasert (Thailand

===== 1994 OFC Women's Championship =====
Pos	Team	Pld	W	D	L	GF	GA	GD	Pts	Qualification
1	Australia (C)	4	3	0	1	13	2	+11	9	Qualification for 1995 FIFA Women's World Cup
2	New Zealand	4	3	0	1	10	2	+8	9	
3	Papua New Guinea (H)	4	0	0	4	0	19	−19	0	

Source: RSSSF
(C) Champions; (H) Hosts

14 October 1994	New Zealand	2–1	Australia	Port Moresby, Papua New Guinea
	Sharpe ?', ?'	Report	Forman ?'

15 October 1994	Australia	9–0	Papua New Guinea	Port Moresby, Papua New Guinea
	Pumpa ?', ?'; Salisbury ?', ?'; Casagrande ?'; Hughes ?'; Forman ?'	Report

18 October 1994	Australia	1–0	New Zealand	Port Moresby, Papua New Guinea
	Murray ?'	Report

19 October 1994	Papua New Guinea	0–4	Australia	Port Moresby, Papua New Guinea
		Report	Salisbury ?'; Casagrande ?'; Hughes ?' ? ?' (o.g.)

===== 1995 Trans-Tasman Cup =====
17 March 1995	Australia	4–0	New Zealand	Canberra, Australia
	Revell ?'; Lembryk ?'; Tann ?' (pen.); Iannotta ?'	Report		Stadium: Australian Institute of Sport

19 March 1995	Australia	2–0	New Zealand	Canberra, Australia
	Tann 15' (pen.); Clayton 65'	Report		Stadium: Australian Institute of Sport

===== 1995 Havelange Trophy =====
====== First round ======
10 April 1995	Australia	7–0	Argentina	Uberlândia, Brazil
	Watson ?', ?'; Hughes ?', ?'; Salisbury ?'; Iannotta ?'; Clayton ?'	Report		Stadium: Estádio Parque do Sabiá; Attendance: 15,000

13 April 1995	Brazil	3–0	Australia	Uberlândia, Brazil
	(unknown) 17', 29', 78'	Report		Stadium: Estádio Parque do Sabiá; Attendance: 20,000

====== Final ======
16 April 1995	Brazil	2–3	Australia	Uberlândia, Brazil
	(unknown) 10', ?'	Report	Watson 1'; Lembryk 25'; Casagrande 27'	Stadium: Estádio Parque do Sabiá

=== Men's under-20 ===
==== Results and fixtures ====
===== 1995 FIFA World Youth Championship =====
====== Group D ======
Pos	Team	Pld	W	D	L	GF	GA	GD	Pts	Qualification
1	Cameroon	3	2	1	0	7	4	+3	7	Advance to knockout stage
2	Australia	3	1	1	1	5	4	+1	4	Advance to knockout stage
3	Costa Rica	3	1	0	2	3	6	−3	3	
4	Germany	3	0	2	1	3	4	−1	2	

Source: RSSSF

13 April 1995	Australia	2–0	Costa Rica	Doha, Qatar
19:45 AST	Viduka 51'; Enes 74' (pen.)	Report		Stadium: Al-Ahly Stadium; Attendance: 1,000; Referee: Abdul Rahman Al-Zaid (Saudi Arabia)

16 April 1995	Australia	2–3	Cameroon	Doha, Qatar
19:45 AST	Viduka 11', 72'	Report	Ntamag 52', 90'; Ndiefi 67'	Stadium: Al-Ahly Stadium; Attendance: 5,000; Referee: Nikolai Levnikov (Russia)

20 April 1995	Australia	1–1	Germany	Doha, Qatar
19:45 AST	Viduka 54'	Report	Rath 23'	Stadium: Khalifa Olympic Stadium; Attendance: 4,000; Referee: Márcio Rezende (Brazil)

====== Knockout stage ======
23 April 1995 Quarter-finals	Portugal	2–1 (a.e.t.)	Australia	Doha, Qatar
20:15 AST	Agostinho 66', 100'	Report	Felipe 72' (o.g.)	Stadium: Al-Ahly Stadium; Attendance: 5,000; Referee: Rune Pedersen (Norway)

===== 1994 OFC U-20 Championship =====
====== Group A ======
Pos	Team	Pld	W	D	L	GF	GA	GD	Pts	Qualification
1	Australia	3	3	0	0	17	0	+17	9	Advance to knockout stage
2	Solomon Islands	3	2	0	1	5	7	−2	6	Advance to knockout stage
3	Tahiti	3	1	0	2	2	7	−5	3	
4	Fiji	3	0	0	3	1	11	−10	0	

Source: RSSSF

24 September 1994	Australia	5–0	Tahiti	Fiji
		Report

26 September 1994	Australia	5–0	Solomon Islands	Fiji
		Report

28 September 1994	Australia	7–0	Fiji	Fiji
		Report

====== Knockout stage ======
1 October 1994 Semi-finals	Australia	11–0	Vanuatu	Fiji
		Report

1 October 1994 Final	Australia	1–0	New Zealand	Fiji
		Report

=== Men's under-17 ===
==== Results and fixtures ====
===== 1995 OFC U-17 Championship =====
====== Group A ======
Pos	Team	Pld	W	D	L	GF	GA	GD	Pts	Qualification
1	Australia	1	1	0	0	4	0	+4	3	Advance to knockout stage
2	Fiji	1	0	0	1	0	4	−4	0	

Source: RSSSF

22 May 1995	Australia	4–0	Fiji	Vanuatu
		Report

====== Knockout stage ======
24 May 1995 Semi-finals	Australia	6–0	Vanuatu	Vanuatu
		Report

26 May 1995 Final	Australia	1–0	New Zealand	Vanuatu
		Report

== Domestic soccer ==
=== National Soccer League ===
Pos	Team	Pld	W	PW	PL	L	GF	GA	GD	Pts	Qualification
1	Melbourne Knights (C)	24	16	2	2	4	56	25	+31	70	Qualification for the Finals series
2	Adelaide City	24	16	1	3	4	41	20	+21	69	Qualification for the Finals series
3	Sydney United	24	15	3	2	4	34	19	+15	68	Qualification for the Finals series
4	Morwell Falcons	24	8	4	7	5	41	37	+4	47	Qualification for the Finals series
5	West Adelaide	24	8	5	3	8	28	32	−4	45	Qualification for the Finals series
6	South Melbourne	24	9	3	2	10	42	36	+6	44	Qualification for the Finals series
7	Brisbane Strikers	24	8	3	3	10	34	32	+2	41	
8	Wollongong City	24	8	2	2	12	39	46	−7	38	
9	Sydney Olympic	24	8	1	3	12	27	34	−7	37	
10	Marconi Fairfield	24	6	4	3	11	34	43	−9	35	
11	Melbourne SC	24	6	4	2	12	20	37	−17	34	
12	Parramatta Eagles	24	7	2	1	14	25	34	−9	33	
13	Heidelberg United	24	6	1	2	15	27	53	−26	28	

Updated to match(es) played on unknown. Source: rsssf.com
Rules for classification: 1) points; 2) goal difference; 3) number of goals scored.
(C) Champion

=== NSL Cup ===
==== Final ====
16 October 1994

Melbourne Knights	6–0	Heidelberg United
Spiteri 30', 70'; Horvat 51'; Biskic 80'; Viduka 86', 87'	Report

Olympic Park, Melbourne
Attendance: 4,500
Referee: Eugene Brazzale
