= Denmark at the FIFA Women's World Cup =

The Denmark women's national football team has represented Denmark at the FIFA Women's World Cup on five occasions, in 1991, 1995, 1999, 2007 and 2023.

== FIFA Women's World Cup record ==
FIFA Women's World Cup Finals record
Year	Result	Pld	W	D*	L	GF	GA	GD
(China) 1991	Quarter-finals	4	1	1	2	7	6	+1
(Sweden) 1995	Quarter-finals	4	1	0	3	7	8	−1
(United States) 1999	Group stage	3	0	0	3	1	8	−7
(United States) 2003	Did not qualify							
(China) 2007	Group stage	3	1	0	2	4	4	0
(Germany) 2011	Did not qualify							
(Canada) 2015	Did not qualify							
(France) 2019	Did not qualify							
(Australia) (New Zealand) 2023	Round of 16	4	2	0	2	3	3	0
(Brazil) 2027	Qualified							
(Costa Rica) (Jamaica) (Mexico) (United States) 2031	To be determined							
(United Kingdom) 2035	To be determined							
Total	6/10	17	5	2	12	22	29	−7

*Draws include knockout matches decided on penalty kicks.

FIFA Women's World Cup Finals history
Year	Round	Date	Opponent	Result	Stadium
(China) 1991	Group stage	17 November	New Zealand	W 3–0	Tianhe Stadium, Guangzhou
(China) 1991	Group stage	19 November	China	D 2–2	Guangdong Provincial Stadium, Guangzhou
(China) 1991	Group stage	21 November	Norway	L 1–2	Ying Dong Stadium, Panyu
(China) 1991	Quarter-finals	24 November	Germany	L 1–2 (aet)	Zhongshan Stadium, Zhongshan
(Sweden) 1995	Group stage	6 June	Australia	W 5–0	Arosvallen, Västerås
(Sweden) 1995	Group stage	8 June	United States	L 0–2	Strömvallen, Gävle
(Sweden) 1995	Group stage	10 June	China	L 1–3	Arosvallen, Västerås
(Sweden) 1995	Quarter-finals	13 June	Norway	L 1–3	Tingvallen, Karlstad
(United States) 1999	Group stage	19 June	United States	L 0–3	Giants Stadium, East Rutherford
(United States) 1999	Group stage	24 June	North Korea	L 1–3	Civic Stadium, Portland
(United States) 1999	Group stage	27 June	Nigeria	L 0–2	Jack Kent Cooke Stadium, Landover
(China) 2007	Group stage	12 September	China	L 2–3	Wuhan Stadium, Wuhan
(China) 2007	Group stage	15 September	New Zealand	W 2–0	Wuhan Stadium, Wuhan
(China) 2007	Group stage	20 September	Brazil	L 0–1	Yellow Dragon Sports Center, Hangzhou
(Australia) (New Zealand) 2023	Group stage	22 July	China	W 1–0	Perth Rectangular Stadium, Perth
(Australia) (New Zealand) 2023	Group stage	28 July	England	L 0–1	Sydney Football Stadium, Sydney
(Australia) (New Zealand) 2023	Group stage	1 August	Haiti	W 2–0	Perth Rectangular Stadium, Perth
(Australia) (New Zealand) 2023	Round of 16	7 August	Australia	L 0–2	Stadium Australia, Sydney
(Brazil) 2027	Group stage				

=== Record by opponent ===
FIFA Women's World Cup matches (by team)
Opponent	Pts	Pld	W	D	L	GF	GA	GD
Australia	3	2	1	0	1	5	2	3
Brazil	0	1	0	0	1	0	1	-1
China	4	4	1	1	2	6	8	-2
England	0	1	0	0	1	0	1	-1
Germany	0	1	0	0	1	1	2	-1
Haiti	3	1	1	0	0	2	0	2
New Zealand	6	2	2	0	0	5	0	5
Nigeria	0	1	0	0	1	0	2	-2
North Korea	0	1	0	0	1	1	3	-2
Norway	0	2	0	0	2	2	5	-3
United States	0	2	0	0	2	0	5	-5

== 1991 FIFA Women's World Cup ==
=== Group A ===
Pos	Team	Pld	W	D	L	GF	GA	GD	Pts	Qualification
1	China (H)	3	2	1	0	10	3	+7	5	Advance to knockout stage
2	Norway	3	2	0	1	6	5	+1	4	Advance to knockout stage
3	Denmark	3	1	1	1	6	4	+2	3	Advance to knockout stage
4	New Zealand	3	0	0	3	1	11	−10	0	

Source: FIFA
Rules for classification: Group stage tiebreakers
(H) Hosts
17 November 1991
19:45

Denmark	3–0	New Zealand
H. Jensen 15', 40'; Mackensie 42'	Report

Tianhe Stadium, Guangzhou
Attendance: 14,000
Referee: Omer Yengo (Congo)
19 November 1991
19:45

China	2–2	Denmark
Sun Wen 37'; Wei Haiying 76'	Report	Kolding 24'; Nissen 55'

Guangdong Provincial Stadium, Guangzhou
Attendance: 27,000
Referee: Vassilios Nikakis (Greece)
21 November 1991
19:45

Norway	2–1	Denmark
Svensson 14' (pen.); Medalen 56'	Report	Thychosen 54' (pen.)

Ying Tung Stadium, Guangzhou
Attendance: 15,500
Referee: Vadim Zhuk (Soviet Union)

=== Quarterfinals ===
24 November 1991
15:30

Denmark	1–2 (a.e.t.)	Germany
Mackensie 25' (pen.)	Report	Wiegmann 17' (pen.); Mohr 98'

Zhongshan Stadium, Zhongshan
Attendance: 12,000
Referee: Vassilios Nikakis (Greece)

== 1995 FIFA Women's World Cup ==
=== Group C ===
Pos	Team	Pld	W	D	L	GF	GA	GD	Pts	Qualification
1	United States	3	2	1	0	9	4	+5	7	Advance to knockout stage
2	China	3	2	1	0	10	6	+4	7	Advance to knockout stage
3	Denmark	3	1	0	2	6	5	+1	3	Advance to knockout stage
4	Australia	3	0	0	3	3	13	−10	0	

Source: FIFA
Rules for classification: Group stage tiebreakers
6 June 1995
19:00

Denmark	5–0	Australia
Krogh 12', 48'; Eggers Nielsen 25'; Jensen 37'; C. Hansen 86'	Report

Arosvallen, Västerås
Attendance: 1,500
Referee: Bente Skogvang (Norway)
8 June 1995
19:00

United States	2–0	Denmark
Lilly 9'; Milbrett 49'	Report

Strömvallen, Gävle
Attendance: 2,704
Referee: Engage Camara (Guinea)
10 June 1995
16:00

China	3–1	Denmark
Shi Guihong 21'; Sun Wen 76'; Wei Haiying 90'	Report	Bonde 44'

Arosvallen, Västerås
Attendance: 1,619
Referee: Eduardo Gamboa (Chile)

=== Quarterfinals ===
13 June 1995
17:15

Norway	3–1	Denmark
Espeseth 21'; Medalen 64'; Riise 85'	Report	Krogh 86'

Tingvalla IP, Karlstad
Attendance: 4,655
Referee: Pirom Un-prasert (Thailand)

== 1999 FIFA Women's World Cup ==
=== Group A ===
Pos	Team	Pld	W	D	L	GF	GA	GD	Pts	Qualification
1	United States (H)	3	3	0	0	13	1	+12	9	Advance to knockout stage
2	Nigeria	3	2	0	1	5	8	−3	6	Advance to knockout stage
3	North Korea	3	1	0	2	4	6	−2	3	
4	Denmark	3	0	0	3	1	8	−7	0	

Source: FIFA
Rules for classification: Group stage tiebreakers
(H) Hosts
June 19, 1999
15:00 EDT (UTC−4)

United States	3–0	Denmark
Hamm 17'; Foudy 73'; Lilly 89'	Report

Giants Stadium, East Rutherford
Attendance: 78,972
Referee: Sonia Denoncourt (Canada)
June 24, 1999
18:00 PDT (UTC−7)

North Korea	3–1	Denmark
Jin Pyol-hui 15'; Jo Song-ok 39'; Kim Kum-sil 73'	Report	Johansen 74'

Civic Stadium, Portland
Attendance: 20,129
Referee: Martha Liliana Pardo (Colombia)
June 27, 1999
16:00 EDT (UTC−4)

Nigeria	2–0	Denmark
Akide 25'; Okosieme 81'	Report

Jack Kent Cooke Stadium, Landover
Attendance: 22,109
Referee: Maria Edilene Siqueira (Brazil)

== 2007 FIFA Women's World Cup ==
=== Group D ===
Pos	Team	Pld	W	D	L	GF	GA	GD	Pts	Qualification
1	Brazil	3	3	0	0	10	0	+10	9	Advance to knockout stage
2	China (H)	3	2	0	1	5	6	−1	6	Advance to knockout stage
3	Denmark	3	1	0	2	4	4	0	3	
4	New Zealand	3	0	0	3	0	9	−9	0	

Source: FIFA
Rules for classification: Group stage tiebreakers
(H) Hosts
12 September 2007
20:00

China	3–2	Denmark
Li Jie 31'; Bi Yan 50'; Song Xiaoli 88'	Report	Nielsen 51'; Sørensen 87'

Wuhan Sports Centre Stadium, Wuhan
Attendance: 50,800
Referee: Dianne Ferreira-James (Guyana)
15 September 2007
17:00

Denmark	2–0	New Zealand
K. Pedersen 61'; Sørensen 66'	Report

Wuhan Sports Centre Stadium, Wuhan
Attendance: 54,000
Referee: Mayumi Oiwa (Japan)
20 September 2007
20:00

Brazil	1–0	Denmark
Pretinha 90+1'	Report

Yellow Dragon Stadium, Hangzhou
Attendance: 43,817
Referee: Kari Seitz (United States)

== 2023 FIFA Women's World Cup ==
=== Group D ===
Pos	Team	Pld	W	D	L	GF	GA	GD	Pts	Qualification
1	England	3	3	0	0	8	1	+7	9	Advance to knockout stage
2	Denmark	3	2	0	1	3	1	+2	6	Advance to knockout stage
3	China	3	1	0	2	2	7	−5	3	
4	Haiti	3	0	0	3	0	4	−4	0	

Source: FIFA
Rules for classification: Group stage tiebreakers
22 July 2023
20:00 UTC+8

Denmark	1–0	China
Vangsgaard 90'	Report

Perth Rectangular Stadium, Perth
Attendance: 16,989
Referee: Marie-Soleil Beaudoin (Canada)

28 July 2023
18:30 UTC+10

England	1–0	Denmark
James 6'	Report

Sydney Football Stadium, Sydney
Attendance: 40,439
Referee: Tess Olofsson (Sweden)

1 August 2023
19:00 UTC+8

Haiti	0–2	Denmark
	Report	Harder 21' (pen.); Troelsgaard 90+10'

Perth Rectangular Stadium, Perth
Attendance: 17,897
Referee: Oh Hyeon-jeong (South Korea)

=== Round of 16 ===
7 August 2023
20:30 UTC+10

Australia	2–0	Denmark
Foord 29'; Raso 70'	Report

Stadium Australia, Sydney
Attendance: 75,784
Referee: Rebecca Welch (England)

== Goalscorers ==
Player	Goals	1991	1995	1999	2007	2023	2027
Helle Jensen	3	2	1				
Gitte Krogh	3		3				
Susan Mackensie	2	2					
Anne Dot Eggers Nielsen	2		1		1		
Cathrine Paaske Sørensen	2				2		
Lisbet Kolding	1	1					
Hanne Nissen	1	1					
Annette Thychosen	1	1					
Christina Hansen	1		1				
Christina Bonde	1		1				
Janni Johansen	1			1			
Katrine Pedersen	1					1	
Amalie Vangsgaard	1				1		
Pernille Harder	1					1	
Sanne Troelsgaard	1					1	
Total	22	7	7	1	4	3	

== See also ==
- Denmark at the UEFA Women's Championship
