= Australia at the FIFA Women's World Cup =

The Australia women's national soccer team has represented Australia at the FIFA Women's World Cup on eight occasions in 1995, 1999, 2003, 2007, 2011, 2015, 2019 and 2023. Australia co-hosted the 2023 FIFA Women's World Cup with New Zealand. The Matildas automatically qualified as co-host, and the Matildas (managed by Tony Gustavsson and captained by Steph Catley and Sam Kerr) finished fourth overall.

It was the first time that a senior national soccer team representing Australia or another Oceanian country has made it to the World Cup semi-finals and also is one of the only three teams of Asian Football Confederation alongside China and Japan which they finished on the top four of the FIFA Women's World Cup.

The team also participated in the 1988 FIFA Women's Invitation Tournament, a precursor to the Women's World Cup.

== FIFA Women's World Cup record ==
FIFA Women's World Cup record
| Year | Result | Position | Pld | W | D | L | GF | GA |
|---|---|---|---|---|---|---|---|---|
| (China) 1991 | Did not qualify | | | | | | | |
| (Sweden) 1995 | Group stage | 12th | 3 | 0 | 0 | 3 | 3 | 13 |
| (United States) 1999 | Group stage | 11th | 3 | 0 | 1 | 2 | 3 | 7 |
| (United States) 2003 | Group stage | 13th | 3 | 0 | 1 | 2 | 3 | 5 |
| (China) 2007 | Quarter-finals | 6th | 4 | 1 | 2 | 1 | 9 | 7 |
| (Germany) 2011 | Quarter-finals | 8th | 4 | 2 | 0 | 2 | 6 | 7 |
| (Canada) 2015 | Quarter-finals | 7th | 5 | 2 | 1 | 2 | 5 | 5 |
| (France) 2019 | Round of 16 | 9th | 4 | 2 | 1 | 1 | 9 | 6 |
| (Australia) (New Zealand) 2023 | Fourth place | 4th | 7 | 3 | 1 | 3 | 10 | 8 |
| (Brazil) 2027 | Qualified | | | | | | | |
| (Costa Rica) (Jamaica) (Mexico) (United States) 2031 | To be determined | | | | | | | |
| (United Kingdom) 2035 | To be determined | | | | | | | |
| Total | 9/12 | 4th | 33 | 10 | 7 | 16 | 48 | 58 |

== Head-to-head record ==
| Opponent | Pld | W | D | L | GF | GA | GD | Win % |
|---|---|---|---|---|---|---|---|---|
| Brazil | 4 | 2 | 0 | 2 | 6 | 6 | +0 | 50.00 |
| Canada | 2 | 1 | 1 | 0 | 6 | 2 | +4 | 50.00 |
| China | 3 | 0 | 1 | 2 | 4 | 8 | −4 | 0.00 |
| Denmark | 2 | 1 | 0 | 1 | 2 | 5 | −3 | 50.00 |
| England | 1 | 0 | 0 | 1 | 1 | 3 | −2 | 0.00 |
| Equatorial Guinea | 1 | 1 | 0 | 0 | 3 | 2 | +1 | 100.00 |
| France | 1 | 0 | 1 | 0 | 0 | 0 | +0 | 0.00 |
| Ghana | 3 | 1 | 1 | 1 | 6 | 4 | +2 | 33.33 |
| Italy | 1 | 0 | 0 | 1 | 1 | 2 | −1 | 0.00 |
| Jamaica | 1 | 1 | 0 | 0 | 4 | 1 | +3 | 100.00 |
| Japan | 1 | 0 | 0 | 1 | 0 | 1 | −1 | 0.00 |
| Nigeria | 2 | 1 | 0 | 1 | 4 | 3 | +1 | 50.00 |
| Norway | 3 | 1 | 2 | 0 | 4 | 3 | +1 | 33.33 |
| Republic of Ireland | 1 | 1 | 0 | 0 | 1 | 0 | +1 | 100.00 |
| Russia | 1 | 0 | 0 | 1 | 1 | 2 | −1 | 0.00 |
| Sweden | 4 | 0 | 1 | 3 | 3 | 9 | −6 | 0.00 |
| United States | 2 | 0 | 0 | 2 | 2 | 7 | −5 | 0.00 |
| Total | 33 | 10 | 7 | 16 | 48 | 58 | −10 | 30.30 |

== 1995 FIFA Women's World Cup ==
=== Group C ===
| Pos | Team | Pld | W | D | L | GF | GA | GD | Pts | Qualification |
|---|---|---|---|---|---|---|---|---|---|---|
| 1 | United States | 3 | 2 | 1 | 0 | 9 | 4 | +5 | 7 | Advance to knockout stage |
| 2 | China | 3 | 2 | 1 | 0 | 10 | 6 | +4 | 7 | Advance to knockout stage |
| 3 | Denmark | 3 | 1 | 0 | 2 | 6 | 5 | +1 | 3 | Advance to knockout stage |
| 4 | Australia | 3 | 0 | 0 | 3 | 3 | 13 | −10 | 0 | |

Source: FIFA
Rules for classification: Group stage tiebreakers
6 June 1995
19:00

| Denmark | 5–0 | Australia |
|---|---|---|
| Krogh 12', 48'; Eggers Nielsen 25'; Jensen 37'; C. Hansen 86' | Report |

Arosvallen, Västerås
Attendance: 1,500
Referee: Bente Skogvang (Norway)

8 June 1995
19:00

| China | 4–2 | Australia |
|---|---|---|
| Zhou Yang 23'; Shi Guihong 54', 78'; Liu Ailing 90+3' | Report | Iannotta 25'; Hughes 89' |

Arosvallen, Västerås
Attendance: 1,500
Referee: Maria Edilene Siqueira (Brazil)

10 June 1995
16:00

| United States | 4–1 | Australia |
|---|---|---|
| Foudy 69'; Fawcett 72'; Overbeck 90+2' (pen.); Keller 90+4' | Report | Casagrande 54' |

Olympia, Helsingborg
Attendance: 1,105
Referee: Pirom Un-prasert (Thailand)

== 1999 FIFA Women's World Cup ==
=== Group D ===
| Pos | Team | Pld | W | D | L | GF | GA | GD | Pts | Qualification |
|---|---|---|---|---|---|---|---|---|---|---|
| 1 | China | 3 | 3 | 0 | 0 | 12 | 2 | +10 | 9 | Advance to knockout stage |
| 2 | Sweden | 3 | 2 | 0 | 1 | 6 | 3 | +3 | 6 | Advance to knockout stage |
| 3 | Australia | 3 | 0 | 1 | 2 | 3 | 7 | −4 | 1 | |
| 4 | Ghana | 3 | 0 | 1 | 2 | 1 | 10 | −9 | 1 | |

Source: FIFA
Rules for classification: Group stage tiebreakers
June 20, 1999
19:30 EDT (UTC−4)

| Australia | 1–1 | Ghana |
|---|---|---|
| Murray 74' | Report | Gyamfuah 76' |

Foxboro Stadium, Foxborough
Attendance: 14,873
Referee: Kari Seitz (United States)

June 23, 1999
20:30 EDT (UTC−4)

| Australia | 1–3 | Sweden |
|---|---|---|
| Murray 32' | Report | Törnqvist 8'; Ljungberg 21', 69' |

Jack Kent Cooke Stadium, Landover
Attendance: 16,448
Referee: Fatou Gaye (Senegal)

June 26, 1999
14:30 EDT (UTC−4)

| China | 3–1 | Australia |
|---|---|---|
| Sun Wen 39', 51'; Liu Ying 73' | Report | Salisbury 66' |

Giants Stadium, East Rutherford
Attendance: 29,401
Referee: Sandra Hunt (United States)

== 2003 FIFA Women's World Cup ==
=== Group D ===
| Pos | Team | Pld | W | D | L | GF | GA | GD | Pts | Qualification |
|---|---|---|---|---|---|---|---|---|---|---|
| 1 | China | 3 | 2 | 1 | 0 | 3 | 1 | +2 | 7 | Advance to knockout stage |
| 2 | Russia | 3 | 2 | 0 | 1 | 5 | 2 | +3 | 6 | Advance to knockout stage |
| 3 | Ghana | 3 | 1 | 0 | 2 | 2 | 5 | −3 | 3 | |
| 4 | Australia | 3 | 0 | 1 | 2 | 3 | 5 | −2 | 1 | |

Source: FIFA
Rules for classification: Group stage tiebreakers
September 21, 2003
17:30 PDT (UTC−7)

| Australia | 1–2 | Russia |
|---|---|---|
| Golebiowski 38' | Report | Alagich 39' (o.g.); Fomina 89' |

Home Depot Center, Carson
Attendance: 15,239
Referee: Bola Elizabeth Abidoye (Nigeria)

September 25, 2003
19:00 PDT (UTC−7)

| China | 1–1 | Australia |
|---|---|---|
| Bai Jie 46' | Report | Garriock 28' |

Home Depot Center, Carson
Attendance: 13,929
Referee: Katriina Elovirta (Finland)

September 28, 2003
17:15 PDT (UTC−7)

| Ghana | 2–1 | Australia |
|---|---|---|
| A. Sackey 34', 39' | Report | Garriock 61' |

PGE Park, Portland
Attendance: 19,132
Referee: Xonam Agboyi (Togo)

== 2007 FIFA Women's World Cup ==
=== Group C ===
| Pos | Team | Pld | W | D | L | GF | GA | GD | Pts | Qualification |
|---|---|---|---|---|---|---|---|---|---|---|
| 1 | Norway | 3 | 2 | 1 | 0 | 10 | 4 | +6 | 7 | Advance to knockout stage |
| 2 | Australia | 3 | 1 | 2 | 0 | 7 | 4 | +3 | 5 | Advance to knockout stage |
| 3 | Canada | 3 | 1 | 1 | 1 | 7 | 4 | +3 | 4 | |
| 4 | Ghana | 3 | 0 | 0 | 3 | 3 | 15 | −12 | 0 | |

Source: FIFA
Rules for classification: Group stage tiebreakers
12 September 2007
17:00

| Ghana | 1–4 | Australia |
|---|---|---|
| Amankwa 70' | Report | Walsh 15'; De Vanna 57', 81'; Garriock 69' |

Yellow Dragon Stadium, Hangzhou
Attendance: 30,752
Referee: Adriana Correa (Colombia)

15 September 2007
20:00

| Australia | 1–1 | Norway |
|---|---|---|
| De Vanna 83' | Report | R. Gulbrandsen 5' |

Yellow Dragon Stadium, Hangzhou
Attendance: 33,835
Referee: Niu Huijun (China PR)

20 September 2007
17:00

| Australia | 2–2 | Canada |
|---|---|---|
| McCallum 53'; Salisbury 90+2' | Report | Tancredi 1'; Sinclair 85' |

Chengdu Sports Centre Stadium, Chengdu
Attendance: 29,300
Referee: Gyöngyi Gaál (Hungary)

=== Quarter-finals ===
23 September 2007
20:00

| Brazil | 3–2 | Australia |
|---|---|---|
| Formiga 4'; Marta 23' (pen.); Cristiane 75' | Report | De Vanna 36'; Colthorpe 68' |

Tianjin Olympic Center Stadium, Tianjin
Attendance: 35,061
Referee: Christine Beck (Germany)

== 2011 FIFA Women's World Cup ==
=== Group D ===
| Pos | Team | Pld | W | D | L | GF | GA | GD | Pts | Qualification |
|---|---|---|---|---|---|---|---|---|---|---|
| 1 | Brazil | 3 | 3 | 0 | 0 | 7 | 0 | +7 | 9 | Advance to knockout stage |
| 2 | Australia | 3 | 2 | 0 | 1 | 5 | 4 | +1 | 6 | Advance to knockout stage |
| 3 | Norway | 3 | 1 | 0 | 2 | 2 | 5 | −3 | 3 | |
| 4 | Equatorial Guinea | 3 | 0 | 0 | 3 | 2 | 7 | −5 | 0 | |

Source: FIFA
Rules for classification: Group stage tiebreakers
29 June 2011
18:15

| Brazil | 1–0 | Australia |
|---|---|---|
| Rosana 54' | Report |

Borussia-Park, Mönchengladbach
Attendance: 27,258
Referee: Jenny Palmqvist (Sweden)

3 July 2011
14:00

| Australia | 3–2 | Equatorial Guinea |
|---|---|---|
| Khamis 8'; Van Egmond 48'; De Vanna 51' | Report | Añonman 21', 83' |

Ruhrstadion, Bochum
Attendance: 15,640
Referee: Gyöngyi Gaál (Hungary)

6 July 2011
18:00

| Australia | 2–1 | Norway |
|---|---|---|
| Simon 57', 87' | Report | Thorsnes 56' |

BayArena, Leverkusen
Attendance: 18,474
Referee: Estela Álvarez (Argentina)

=== Quarter-finals ===
10 July 2011
13:00

| Sweden | 3–1 | Australia |
|---|---|---|
| Sjögran 11'; Dahlkvist 16'; Schelin 52' | Report | Perry 40' |

Impuls Arena, Augsburg
Attendance: 24,605
Referee: Silvia Reyes (Peru)

== 2015 FIFA Women's World Cup ==
=== Group D ===
| Pos | Team | Pld | W | D | L | GF | GA | GD | Pts | Qualification |
|---|---|---|---|---|---|---|---|---|---|---|
| 1 | United States | 3 | 2 | 1 | 0 | 4 | 1 | +3 | 7 | Advance to knockout stage |
| 2 | Australia | 3 | 1 | 1 | 1 | 4 | 4 | 0 | 4 | Advance to knockout stage |
| 3 | Sweden | 3 | 0 | 3 | 0 | 4 | 4 | 0 | 3 | Advance to knockout stage |
| 4 | Nigeria | 3 | 0 | 1 | 2 | 3 | 6 | −3 | 1 | |

Source: FIFA
Rules for classification: Group stage tiebreakers
8 June 2015
18:30 CDT (UTC−5)

| United States | 3–1 | Australia |
|---|---|---|
| Rapinoe 12', 78'; Press 61' | Report | De Vanna 27' |

Investors Group Field, Winnipeg
Attendance: 31,148
Referee: Claudia Umpiérrez (Uruguay)

12 June 2015
16:00 CDT (UTC−5)

| Australia | 2–0 | Nigeria |
|---|---|---|
| Simon 29', 68' | Report |

Investors Group Field, Winnipeg
Attendance: 32,716
Referee: Stéphanie Frappart (France)

16 June 2015
18:00 MDT (UTC−6)

| Australia | 1–1 | Sweden |
|---|---|---|
| De Vanna 5' | Report | Jakobsson 15' |

Commonwealth Stadium, Edmonton
Attendance: 10,177
Referee: Lucila Venegas (Mexico)

=== Round of 16 ===
21 June 2015
14:00 ADT (UTC−3)

| Brazil | 0–1 | Australia |
|---|---|---|
| | Report | Simon 80' |

Moncton Stadium, Moncton
Attendance: 12,054
Referee: Teodora Albon (Romania)

=== Quarter-finals ===
27 June 2015
14:00 MDT (UTC−6)

| Australia | 0–1 | Japan |
|---|---|---|
| | Report | Iwabuchi 87' |

Commonwealth Stadium, Edmonton
Attendance: 19,814
Referee: Kateryna Monzul (Ukraine)

== 2019 FIFA Women's World Cup ==
=== Group C ===
| Pos | Team | Pld | W | D | L | GF | GA | GD | Pts | Qualification |
|---|---|---|---|---|---|---|---|---|---|---|
| 1 | Italy | 3 | 2 | 0 | 1 | 7 | 2 | +5 | 6 | Advance to knockout stage |
| 2 | Australia | 3 | 2 | 0 | 1 | 8 | 5 | +3 | 6 | Advance to knockout stage |
| 3 | Brazil | 3 | 2 | 0 | 1 | 6 | 3 | +3 | 6 | Advance to knockout stage |
| 4 | Jamaica | 3 | 0 | 0 | 3 | 1 | 12 | −11 | 0 | |

Source: FIFA
Rules for classification: Group stage tiebreakers
9 June 2019
13:00

| Australia | 1–2 | Italy |
|---|---|---|
| Kerr 22' | Report | Bonansea 56', 90+5' |

Stade du Hainaut, Valenciennes
Attendance: 15,380
Referee: Melissa Borjas (Honduras)

13 June 2019
18:00

| Australia | 3–2 | Brazil |
|---|---|---|
| Foord 45+1'; Logarzo 58'; Mônica 66' (o.g.) | Report | Marta 27' (pen.); Cristiane 38' |

Stade de la Mosson, Montpellier
Attendance: 17,032
Referee: Esther Staubli (Switzerland)

18 June 2019
21:00

| Jamaica | 1–4 | Australia |
|---|---|---|
| Solaun 49' | Report | Kerr 11', 42', 69', 83' |

Stade des Alpes, Grenoble
Attendance: 17,402
Referee: Katalin Kulcsár (Hungary)

=== Round of 16 ===
22 June 2019
21:00

| Norway | 1–1 (a.e.t.) | Australia |
|---|---|---|
| Herlovsen 31' | Report | Kellond-Knight 83' |
Penalties
| Graham Hansen (penalty scored); Reiten (penalty scored); Mjelde (penalty scored); Syrstad Engen (penalty scored) | 4–1 | (penalty missed) Kerr; (penalty missed) Gielnik; (penalty scored) Catley |

Allianz Riviera, Nice
Attendance: 12,229
Referee: Riem Hussein (Germany)

== 2023 FIFA Women's World Cup ==
=== Group B ===
| Pos | Team | Pld | W | D | L | GF | GA | GD | Pts | Qualification |
|---|---|---|---|---|---|---|---|---|---|---|
| 1 | Australia (H) | 3 | 2 | 0 | 1 | 7 | 3 | +4 | 6 | Advance to knockout stage |
| 2 | Nigeria | 3 | 1 | 2 | 0 | 3 | 2 | +1 | 5 | Advance to knockout stage |
| 3 | Canada | 3 | 1 | 1 | 1 | 2 | 5 | −3 | 4 | |
| 4 | Republic of Ireland | 3 | 0 | 1 | 2 | 1 | 3 | −2 | 1 | |

Source: FIFA
Rules for classification: Group stage tiebreakers
(H) Hosts
20 July 2023
20:00 UTC+10

| Australia | 1–0 | Republic of Ireland |
|---|---|---|
| Catley 52' (pen.) | Report |

Stadium Australia, Sydney
Attendance: 75,784
Referee: Edina Alves Batista (Brazil)

27 July 2023
20:00 UTC+10

| Australia | 2–3 | Nigeria |
|---|---|---|
| Van Egmond 45+1'; Kennedy 90+10' | Report | Kanu 45+6'; Ohale 65'; Oshoala 72' |

Lang Park, Brisbane
Attendance: 49,156
Referee: Esther Staubli (Switzerland)

31 July 2023
20:00 UTC+10

| Canada | 0–4 | Australia |
|---|---|---|
| | Report | Raso 9', 39'; Fowler 58'; Catley 90+4' (pen.) |

Melbourne Rectangular Stadium, Melbourne
Attendance: 27,706
Referee: Stéphanie Frappart (France)

=== Round of 16 ===
7 August 2023
20:30 UTC+10

| Australia | 2–0 | Denmark |
|---|---|---|
| Foord 29'; Raso 70' | Report |

Stadium Australia, Sydney
Attendance: 75,784
Referee: Rebecca Welch (England)

=== Quarter-finals ===
12 August 2023
17:00 UTC+10

| Australia | 0–0 (a.e.t.) | France |
|---|---|---|
| | Report |
Penalties
| Foord (penalty scored); Catley (penalty missed); Kerr (penalty scored); Fowler (penalty scored); Arnold (penalty missed); Gorry (penalty scored); Yallop (penalty scored); Carpenter (penalty scored); Hunt (penalty missed); Vine (penalty scored) | 7–6 | (penalty missed) Bacha; (penalty scored) Diani; (penalty scored) Renard; (penalty scored) Le Sommer; (penalty missed) Périsset; (penalty scored) Geyoro; (penalty scored) Karchaoui; (penalty scored) Lakrar; (penalty missed) Dali; (penalty missed) Bècho |

Lang Park, Brisbane
Attendance: 49,461
Referee: María Carvajal (Chile)

=== Semi-finals ===
16 August 2023
20:00 UTC+10

| Australia | 1–3 | England |
|---|---|---|
| Kerr 63' | Report | Toone 36'; Hemp 71'; Russo 86' |

Stadium Australia, Sydney
Attendance: 75,784
Referee: Tori Penso (United States)

=== Third place play-off ===
19 August 2023
18:00 UTC+10

| Sweden | 2–0 | Australia |
|---|---|---|
| Rolfö 30' (pen.); Asllani 62' | Report |

Lang Park, Brisbane
Attendance: 49,461
Referee: Cheryl Foster (Wales)

== Goalscorers ==
| Player | Goals | 1995 | 1999 | 2003 | 2007 | 2011 | 2015 | 2019 | 2023 | 2027 |
|---|---|---|---|---|---|---|---|---|---|---|
| Lisa De Vanna | 7 | | | | 4 | 1 | 2 | | | |
| Sam Kerr | 6 | | | | | | | 5 | 1 | |
| Kyah Simon | 5 | | | | | 2 | 3 | | | |
| Heather Garriock | 3 | | | 2 | 1 | | | | | |
| Hayley Raso | 3 | | | | | | | | 3 | |
| Julie Murray | 2 | | 2 | | | | | | | |
| Cheryl Salisbury | 2 | | 1 | | 1 | | | | | |
| Emily Van Egmond | 2 | | | | | 1 | | | 1 | |
| Caitlin Foord | 2 | | | | | | | 1 | 1 | |
| Steph Catley | 2 | | | | | | | | 2 | |
| Lisa Casagrande | 1 | 1 | | | | | | | | |
| Sunni Hughes | 1 | 1 | | | | | | | | |
| Angela Iannotta | 1 | 1 | | | | | | | | |
| Kelly Golebiowski | 1 | | | 1 | | | | | | |
| Lauren Colthorpe | 1 | | | | 1 | | | | | |
| Collette McCallum | 1 | | | | 1 | | | | | |
| Sarah Walsh | 1 | | | | 1 | | | | | |
| Leena Khamis | 1 | | | | | 1 | | | | |
| Ellyse Perry | 1 | | | | | 1 | | | | |
| Chloe Logarzo | 1 | | | | | | | 1 | | |
| Elise Kellond-Knight | 1 | | | | | | | 1 | | |
| Alanna Kennedy | 1 | | | | | | | | 1 | |
| Mary Fowler | 1 | | | | | | | | 1 | |
| Own goal | 1 | | | | | | | 1 | | |
| Total | 48 | 3 | 3 | 3 | 9 | 6 | 5 | 9 | 10 | |

Own goals scored for opponents

- Dianne Alagich (scored for Russia in 2003)
