= Denmark at the 1996 Summer Olympics =

- IOC code: DEN
- NOC: National Olympic Committee and Sports Confederation of Denmark
- Website: www.dif.dk (in Danish and English)

in Atlanta
- Competitors: 119 (54 men and 65 women) in 14 sports
- Flag bearer: Thomas Stuer-Lauridsen
- Medals Ranked 19th: Gold 4 Silver 1 Bronze 1 Total 6

Summer Olympics appearances (overview)
- 1896; 1900; 1904; 1908; 1912; 1920; 1924; 1928; 1932; 1936; 1948; 1952; 1956; 1960; 1964; 1968; 1972; 1976; 1980; 1984; 1988; 1992; 1996; 2000; 2004; 2008; 2012; 2016; 2020; 2024

Other related appearances
- 1906 Intercalated Games

Denmark competed at the 1996 Summer Olympics in Atlanta, United States. 119 competitors, 54 men and 65 women, took part in 66 events in 14 sports.

== Medalists ==
=== Gold ===
- Poul-Erik Høyer-Larsen — Badminton, Men's Singles Competition
- Thomas Poulsen, Eskild Ebbesen, Victor Feddersen, and Niels Henriksen — Rowing, Men's Lightweight Coxless Four
- Kristine Roug — Sailing, Women's Europe Class
- Anne Dorthe Tanderup, Gitte Madsen, Lene Rantala, Gitte Sunesen, Tonje Kjærgaard, Janne Kolling, Susanne Munk Lauritsen, Conny Hamann, Anja Byrial Hansen, Anette Hoffmann, Heidi Astrup, Tina Bøttzau, Marianne Florman, Anja Andersen, Camilla Andersen, and Kristine Andersen — Handball, Women's Team Competition

=== Silver ===
- Rolf Sørensen — Cycling, Men's Individual Road Race

=== Bronze ===
- Trine Hansen — Rowing, Women's Single Sculls

== Athletics ==
Men's 20 km Walk

- Claus Jørgensen
  - Final — 1.25:28 (→ 29th place)

Men's Pole Vault

- Martin Voss
  - Qualification — 5.40m (→ did not advance)

Men's Hammer Throw

- Jan Bielecki
  - Qualification — 69.40m (→ did not advance)

Women's 5,000 metres

- Nina Christiansen
  - Qualification — 15:56.38 (→ did not advance)

Women's Long Jump

- Renata Nielsen
  - Qualification — no mark (→ did not advance)

Women's Javelin Throw

- Jette Jeppesen
  - Qualification — 56.16m (→ did not advance)

Women's Marathon

- Gitte Karlshøj — did not finish (→ no ranking)

== Boxing ==
Men's Welterweight (– 67 kg)

- Hasan Al
  - First Round — Defeated Rogelio Martínez (Dominican Republic), referee stopped contest in third round
  - Second Round — Defeated Sergiy Dzindziruk (Ukraine), 10–4
  - Quarterfinals — Lost to Marian Simion (Romania), 8–16

Men's Middleweight (– 75 kg)

- Brian Johansen
  - First Round — Lost to Dilshod Yarbekov (Uzbekistan), referee stopped contest in third round

== Cycling ==
=== Road Competition ===
Men's Individual Time Trial

- Bjarne Riis
  - Final — 1:07:47 (→ 14th place)
- Rolf Sørensen
  - Final — did not start (→ no ranking)

=== Track Competition ===
Men's Points Race

- Jan Bo Petersen
  - Final — 7 points (→ 18th place)

=== Mountain Bike ===
Men's Cross Country

- Lennie Kristensen
  - Final — 2:26:02 (→ 7th place)
- Jan Erik Østergaard
  - Final — 2:34:30 (→ 18th place)

== Fencing ==
One female fencer represented Denmark in 1996.

Women's épée

- Eva Fjellerup

== Football ==
=== Women's team competition ===
- Team Roster
  - Dorthe Larsen
  - Annette Laursen
  - Bonny Madsen
  - Kamma Flæng
  - Rikke Holm
  - Christina Petersen
  - Birgit Christensen
  - Lisbet Kolding
  - Helle Jensen
  - Gitte Krogh
  - Lene Madsen
  - Lene Terp
  - Anne Nielsen
  - Merete Pedersen
  - Christina Bonde

== Sailing ==
Men

Athlete	Event	Race										Net points	Final rank
Athlete	Event	1	2	3	4	5	6	7	8	9	10	Net points	Final rank
Morten Egeblad Christoffersen	Men's Mistral	22	20	17	15	~~PMS~~	8	15	19	7	—N/a	101.0	17
Bjørn Westergaard	Finn	12	16	~~25~~	8	23	14	4	~~PMS~~	22	23	122.0	21

Women

Athlete	Event	Race											Net points	Final rank
Athlete	Event	1	2	3	4	5	6	7	8	9	10	11	Net points	Final rank
Kristine Roug	Europe	2	1	3	2	1	2	~~8~~	1	~~8~~	7	5	24.0	Gold medal
Susanne Ward; Michaëla Ward-Meehan	Women's 470	6	3	~~15~~	2	14	2	4	12	~~18~~	7	6	56.0	6

Open

Athlete	Event	Race											Net points	Final rank
Athlete	Event	1	2	3	4	5	6	7	8	9	10	11	Net points	Final rank
Jens Eckardt	Laser	~~31~~	16	17	11	7	8	26	17	13	27	~~DNF~~	142.0	17
Michael Hestbæk; Martin Hejlsberg	Star	7	9	8	2	12	10	6	10	12	13	—N/a	64.0	9

Match racing

Athlete	Event	Qualification races										Total	Rank	Quarterfinals	Semifinals	Final / BM	Rank
Athlete	Event	1	2	3	4	5	6	7	8	9	10	Total	Rank	Quarterfinals	Semifinals	Final / BM	Rank
Stig Westergaard; Jan Eli Andersen; Jens Bojsen-Møller	Soling	15	6	3	16	~~PMS~~	2	11	~~PMS~~	4	1	58.0	6 Q	GBR L 2–3	did not advance		6

== Shooting ==
Men's Rapid-Fire Pistol (25 metres)

- Anders Lau

Men's Small-Bore Rifle Three Positions (50 metres)

- Jens Harskov Loczi

Men's Small-Bore Rifle Prone (50 metres)

- Jens Harskov Loczi
- Torben Grimmel

Men's Trap

- Keld Hansen

Men's Skeet

- Ole Riber Rasmussen

Women's Air Pistol (10 metres)

- Susanne Meyerhoff
- Majbritt Hjortshøj

Women's Sporting Pistol (25 metres)

- Susanne Meyerhoff

Women's Air Rifle (10 metres)

- Anni Bissø

Women's Small-Bore Rifle, Three Positions, 50 metres

- Anni Bissø

== Swimming ==
Men's 200m Freestyle

- Jacob Carstensen
  - Heat — 1:50.79
  - B-Final — 1:50.54 (→ 14th place)

Men's 400m Freestyle

- Jacob Carstensen
  - Heat — 3:52.62
  - Final — 3:54.45 (→ 8th place)

Men's 1500m Freestyle

- Jacob Carstensen
  - Heat — 15:43.75 (→ did not advance, 23rd place)

Women's 50m Freestyle

- Mette Nielsen
  - Heat — 26.50 (→ did not advance, 28th place)

Women's 100m Freestyle

- Mette Jacobsen
  - Heat — 56.06
  - Final — 56.01 (→ 7th place)

Women's 400m Freestyle

- Britt Raaby
  - Heat — 4:21.46 (→ did not advance, 25th place)

Women's 100m Backstroke

- Mette Jacobsen
  - Heat — 1:03.14
  - B-Final — scratched

Women's 200m Backstroke

- Mette Jacobsen
  - Heat — 2:16.68 (→ did not advance, 17th place)

Women's 100m Butterfly

- Mette Jacobsen
  - Heat — 1:00.91
  - Final — 1:00.76 (→ 8th place)
- Sophia Skou
  - Heat — 1:01.25
  - B-Final — 1:00.95 (→ 11th place)

Women's 200m Butterfly

- Sophia Skou
  - Heat — 2:13.59
  - B-Final — 2:12.41 (→ 9th place)

Women's 200m Individual Medley

- Britta Vestergaard
  - Heat — 2:18.35
  - B-Final — 2:17.95 (→ 14th place)

Women's 400m Individual Medley

- Britta Vestergaard
  - Heat — 4:55.03 (→ did not advance, 20th place)

Women's 4 × 100 m Freestyle Relay

- Mette Nielsen, Mette Jacobsen, Karen Egdal, and Ditte Jensen
  - Heat — 3:48.93 (→ did not advance, 13th place)

Women's 4 × 200 m Freestyle Relay

- Ditte Jensen, Britta Vestergaard, Britt Raaby, and Berit Puggaard
  - Heat — 8:16.32 (→ did not advance, 13th place)

== Tennis ==
Men's Singles Competition

- Frederik Fetterlein
  - First round — Defeated Jacco Eltingh (Netherlands) 6–4 4–6 8–6
  - Second round — Lost to Marc Rosset (Switzerland) 6–7 5–7
- Kenneth Carlsen
  - First round — Defeated Mark Knowles (Bahamas) 7–5 6–3
  - Second round — Defeated Jason Stoltenberg (Australia) 6–2 3–6 6–3
  - Third round — Lost to MaliVai Washington (United States) 7–6 0–6 2–6
