= Manthei =

Manthei is a surname of German/Prussian origin. Notable people with the surname include:

- Holly Manthei (born 1976), American soccer player
- Kevin Manthei (born 1970), American composer
- Douglas Manthei (born 1990), American Economist
