= Iannotta =

Iannotta is a surname. Notable people with the surname include:

- Angela Iannotta (born 1971), Australian football player and coach
- Gianfranco Iannotta (born 1994), American athlete
