= Denmark at the UEFA Women's Championship =

Denmark have participated 11 times at the UEFA Women's Championship: Their best achievement is reaching the UEFA Women's Championships final in (2017).

== UEFA Women's Championship ==
UEFA Women's Championship record								Qualifying record							
Year	Result	GP	W	D*	L	GF	GA	GP	W	D*	L	GF	GA	P/R	Rnk
1984	Semi-finals	2	0	0	2	1	3	6	3	2	1	8	5		
(Norway) 1987	Did not qualify							6	2	2	2	10	10		
(West Germany) 1989	Did not qualify							8	5	1	2	14	12		
(Denmark) 1991	Third place	2	1	1	0	2	1	8	6	2	0	19	2		
(Italy) 1993	Third place	2	1	0	1	3	2	6	4	2	0	17	4		
(England) (Germany) (Norway) (Sweden) 1995	Did not qualify							6	5	0	1	34	4		
(Norway) (Sweden) 1997	Group stage	3	0	1	2	2	9	8	6	0	2	26	6		
(Germany) 2001	Semi-finals	4	2	0	2	6	6	8	5	0	3	32	15		
(England) 2005	Group stage	3	1	1	1	4	4	8	7	1	0	26	4		
(Finland) 2009	Group stage	3	1	0	2	3	4	8	7	0	1	23	5		
(Sweden) 2013	Semi-finals	5	0	4	1	5	6	8	7	0	1	28	3		
(Netherlands) 2017	Runners-up	6	3	1	2	6	6	8	6	1	1	22	1		
(England) 2022	Group stage	3	1	0	2	1	5	10	9	1	0	48	1		
(Switzerland) 2025	Group stage	3	0	0	3	3	6	6	4	0	2	14	8	(Note: From Euro 2025 onwards a new qualifying format was introduced, linked to the Women's Nations League where teams are divided into leagues with promotion/relegation between the leagues at the end of each cycle.)	6th
(Germany) 2029															
Total	11/14	36	10	8	18	36	52	104	76	12	16	321	80		

== Head-to-head record ==
Opponent	Pld	W	D	L	GF	GA	GD	Win %
Austria	1	0	1	0	0	0	+0	0.00
Belgium	1	1	0	0	1	0	+1	100.00
England	3	1	0	2	2	4	−2	33.33
Finland	4	1	1	2	3	4	−1	25.00
France	2	1	1	0	5	4	+1	50.00
Germany	5	2	0	3	6	10	−4	40.00
Italy	4	1	1	2	6	7	−1	25.00
Netherlands	3	0	0	3	3	7	−4	0.00
Norway	6	2	2	2	3	7	−4	33.33
Poland	1	0	0	1	2	3	−1	0.00
Spain	1	0	0	1	0	1	−1	0.00
Sweden	4	0	2	2	2	4	−2	0.00
Ukraine	1	1	0	0	2	1	+1	100.00
Total	36	10	8	18	36	52	−16	27.78

== See also ==
- Denmark at the FIFA Women's World Cup
