= Sarah Cooper (soccer) =

Australian soccer player (born 1969)

Personal information
- Full name: Sarah Raymond
- Birth name: Sarah Cooper
- Date of birth: 8 October 1969 (age 57)
- Place of birth: Scotland
- Height: 1.76 m (5 ft 9 in)
- Position: Defender

International career
Years	Team	Apps	(Gls)
1991–2001	Australia	55	(2)

Sarah Raymond (née Cooper; born 8 October 1969) is the former captain of Australia women's national association football team.

Cooper played more than 50 matches for her country and represented Australia at the 1995 and 1999 FIFA Women's World Cup.

== In popular culture ==
Cooper posed nude with some of her teammates in the controversial "The Matildas: the new fashion in football: 2000 Olympic year calendar" in an effort to increase visibility of the team and raise money for their Olympic Games preparation. A royalty from the sale of each calendar was used to support the team's 2000 Summer Olympic Games preparation.
