= Bettina Allentoft =

Danish footballer (born 1973)

Personal information
- Date of birth: 16 November 1973 (age 52)
- Position: Defender

International career^{‡}
| Years | Team | Apps | (Gls) |
- Denmark
- ‡ National team caps and goals as of 5 June 1995 (before the 1995 FIFA Women's World Cup)

Bettina Allentoft (born 16 November 1973) is a Danish footballer who played as a defender for the Denmark national team. She was part of the team at the 1995 FIFA World Cup.
