= 1995 FIFA Women's World Cup =

Världsmästerskapet i fotboll för damer 1995
- Official logo

Tournament details
- Host country: Sweden
- Dates: 5–18 June
- Teams: 12 (from 6 confederations)
- Venues: 5 (in 5 host cities)

Final positions
- Champions: Norway (1st title)
- Runners-up: Germany
- Third place: United States
- Fourth place: China

Tournament statistics
- Matches played: 26
- Goals scored: 99 (3.81 per match)
- Attendance: 112,213 (4,316 per match)
- Top scorer: (Norway) Ann Kristin Aarønes (6 goals)
- Best player: (Norway) Hege Riise
- Fair play award: Sweden

The 1995 FIFA Women's World Cup, the second edition of the FIFA Women's World Cup, was held in Sweden and won by Norway, who became the first European nation to win the Women's World Cup. The tournament featured 12 women's national teams from six continental confederations. The 12 teams were drawn into three groups of four and each group played a round-robin tournament. At the end of the group stage, the top two teams and two best third-ranked teams advanced to the knockout stage, beginning with the quarter-finals and culminating with the final at Råsunda Stadium on 18 June 1995.

Sweden became the first country to host both men's and women's World Cup, having hosted the men's in 1958.

Australia, Canada, and England made their debuts in the competition. The tournament also hosted as qualification for the 1996 Summer Olympics, with the eight quarter-finalists being invited to the Olympics. In the second edition of the Women's World Cup, matches were lengthened to the standard 90 minutes, and three points were awarded for a win.

== Summary ==
Bulgaria was originally awarded hosting rights for the tournament, but had to relinquish the rights and FIFA ended up awarding the tournament to Sweden. About 112,000 tickets were sold for the entire tournament.

As a FIFA rules experiment, each team was allowed a two-minute time out each half.

Norway won the 1995 title, with one in four Norwegians watching the game on television. Norway's team plane was escorted back to Oslo by two F-16s on their way to a victory celebration.

== Venues ==
1995 FIFA Women's World Cup is located in Southern Sweden	Strömvallen, Gävle (Capacity: 7,300); Olympia Stadion, Helsingborg (Capacity: 17,200); Tingvalla IP, Karlstad (Capacity: 5,000); Arosvallen, Västerås (Capacity: 10,000); Råsunda, Solna (Capacity: 36,800)

== Teams ==
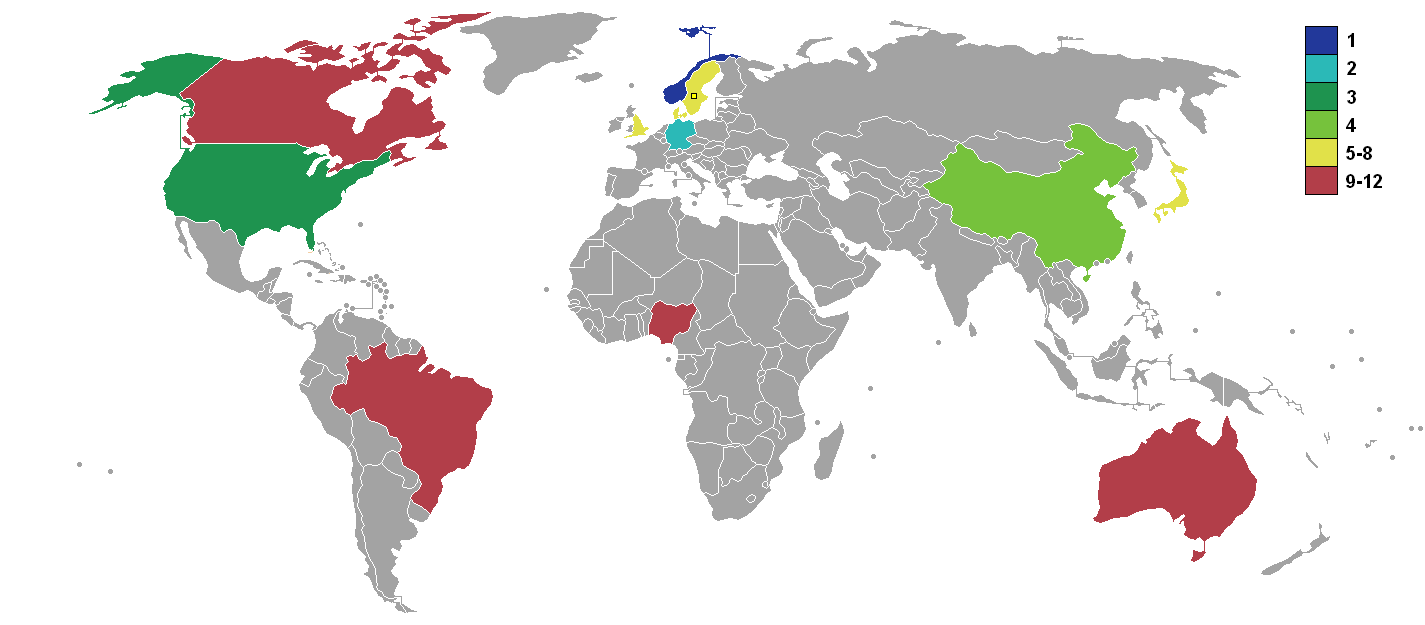
Qualifying countries and their results of the 1995 Women's World Cup

As in the previous edition of the FIFA Women's World cup, held in 1991, 12 teams participated in the final tournament. The teams were:

- Africa (CAF)
  - Nigeria
- Asia (AFC)
  - China
  - Japan
- South America (CONMEBOL)
  - Brazil
- Oceania (OFC)
  - Australia (debut)
- Europe (UEFA)
  - Denmark
  - England (debut)
  - Germany
  - Norway
  - Sweden (qualified automatically as hosts)
- North America, Central America & Caribbean (CONCACAF)
  - Canada (debut)
  - United States

== Squads ==
For a list of the squads that competed in the final tournament, see 1995 FIFA Women's World Cup squads.

== Match officials ==
Referees
Confederation	Referee
Female officials
CONCACAF	Sonia Denoncourt (Canada)
CONCACAF	Catherine Leann Hepburn (United States)
CONMEBOL	Maria Edilene Siqueira (Brazil)
OFC	Linda May Black (New Zealand)
UEFA	Ingrid Jonsson (Sweden)
UEFA	Eva Ödlund (Sweden) (Note: Also served as an assistant referee for one match.)
UEFA	Bente Skogvang (Norway)
Male officials
AFC	Pirom Un-prasert (Thailand)
CAF	Engage Camara (Guinea)
CAF	Petros Mathabela (South Africa)
CONMEBOL	Eduardo Gamboa (Chile)
UEFA	Alain Hamer (Luxembourg)

Assistant referees
Confederation	Assistant referee
Female officials
AFC	Hisae Yoshizawa (Japan)
CONCACAF	María del Socorro Rodríguez (Mexico)
CONMEBOL	Ana Bia Batista (Brazil)
UEFA	Christine Frai (Germany)
UEFA	Gitte Holm (Denmark)
UEFA	Corinne Lagrange (France)
UEFA	Veronika Schluchter-Märki (Switzerland)
Male officials
AFC	Jeon Young-hyun (South Korea)
CAF	Amir Osman Mohamed Hamid (Sudan)
CAF	Mamadou Touré (Mali)
CONCACAF	Peter Kelly (Trinidad and Tobago)
CONMEBOL	Manuel Yupanqui Souza (Peru)

== Draw ==
The draw for the group stage was held on 18 February 1995 in a public ceremony at the Elite Hotel Marina Plaza in Helsingborg, Sweden. The draw was conducted by Sepp Blatter, then the FIFA General Secretary, and assisted by Swedish internationals Tomas Brolin and Kristin Bengtsson, winners of the 1994 Guldbollen and Diamantbollen, respectively. There was no television coverage of the draw.

== Group stage ==
Tie-breaking criteria for group play
The ranking of teams in the group stage was determined as follows:
1. Points obtained in all group matches (three points for a win, one for a draw, none for a defeat);
2. Goal difference in all group matches;
3. Number of goals scored in all group matches;
4. Points obtained in the matches played between the teams in question;
5. Goal difference in the matches played between the teams in question;
6. Number of goals scored in the matches played between the teams in question;
7. Drawing of lots.

=== Group A ===
Pos	Team	Pld	W	D	L	GF	GA	GD	Pts	Qualification
1	Germany	3	2	0	1	9	4	+5	6	Advance to knockout stage
2	Sweden (H)	3	2	0	1	5	3	+2	6	Advance to knockout stage
3	Japan	3	1	0	2	2	4	−2	3	Advance to knockout stage
4	Brazil	3	1	0	2	3	8	−5	3	

Source: FIFA
(H) Hosts
5 June 1995
14:00

Germany	1–0	Japan
Neid 23'	Report

Tingvalla IP, Karlstad
Attendance: 3,824
Referee: Petros Mathabela (South Africa)
5 June 1995
18:00

Sweden	0–1	Brazil
	Report	Roseli 37'

Olympia, Helsingborg
Attendance: 14,500
Referee: Sonia Denoncourt (Canada)

7 June 1995
19:00

Sweden	3–2	Germany
Andersson 65' (pen.), 86'; Sundhage 80'	Report	Wiegmann 9' (pen.); Lohn 42'

Olympia, Helsingborg
Attendance: 5,855
Referee: Linda May Black (New Zealand)
7 June 1995
19:00

Brazil	1–2	Japan
Pretinha 7'	Report	Noda 13', 45'

Tingvalla IP, Karlstad
Attendance: 2,286
Referee: Catherine Leann Hepburn (United States)

9 June 1995
19:00

Sweden	2–0	Japan
Videkull 66'; Andelén 88'	Report

Arosvallen, Västerås
Attendance: 7,811
Referee: Petros Mathabela (South Africa)
9 June 1995
19:00

Brazil	1–6	Germany
Roseli 19'	Report	Prinz 5'; Meinert 22'; Wiegmann 42' (pen.); Mohr 78', 89'; Bernhard 90'

Tingvalla IP, Karlstad
Attendance: 3,203
Referee: Alain Hamer (Luxembourg)

=== Group B ===
Pos	Team	Pld	W	D	L	GF	GA	GD	Pts	Qualification
1	Norway	3	3	0	0	17	0	+17	9	Advance to knockout stage
2	England	3	2	0	1	6	6	0	6	Advance to knockout stage
3	Canada	3	0	1	2	5	13	−8	1	
4	Nigeria	3	0	1	2	5	14	−9	1	

Source: FIFA
6 June 1995
19:00

Norway	8–0	Nigeria
Sandberg 30', 44', 82'; Riise 49'; Aarønes 60', 90'; Medalen 67'; Svensson 76' (pen.)	Report

Tingvalla IP, Karlstad
Attendance: 4,344
Referee: Alain Hamer (Luxembourg)
6 June 1995
19:00

England	3–2	Canada
Coultard 51' (pen.), 85'; Spacey 76' (pen.)	Report	Stoumbos 87'; Donnelly 90+1'

Olympia, Helsingborg
Attendance: 655
Referee: Eva Ödlund (Sweden)

8 June 1995
19:00

Norway	2–0	England
Haugen 7'; Riise 37'	Report

Tingvalla IP, Karlstad
Attendance: 5,520
Referee: Eduardo Gamboa (Chile)
8 June 1995
19:00

Nigeria	3–3	Canada
Nwadike 26'; Avre 60'; Okoroafor 77'	Report	Burtini 12', 55'; Donnelly 20'

Olympia, Helsingborg
Attendance: 250
Referee: Pirom Un-prasert (Thailand)

10 June 1995
16:00

Norway	7–0	Canada
Aarønes 4', 21', 90+3'; Riise 12'; Pettersen 71', 89'; Leinan 84'	Report

Strömvallen, Gävle
Attendance: 2,715
Referee: Maria Edilene Siqueira (Brazil)
10 June 1995
16:00

Nigeria	2–3	England
Okoroafor 13'; Nwadike 74'	Report	Farley 10', 38'; Walker 27'

Tingvalla IP, Karlstad
Attendance: 1,843
Referee: Ingrid Jonsson (Sweden)

=== Group C ===
Pos	Team	Pld	W	D	L	GF	GA	GD	Pts	Qualification
1	United States	3	2	1	0	9	4	+5	7	Advance to knockout stage
2	China	3	2	1	0	10	6	+4	7	Advance to knockout stage
3	Denmark	3	1	0	2	6	5	+1	3	Advance to knockout stage
4	Australia	3	0	0	3	3	13	−10	0	

Source: FIFA

Group C started with back-and-forth 3–3 draw between the United States and China with the Chinese coming back from a 3–1 deficit. Denmark's opening 5–0 win over Australia, in which Sonia Gegenhuber was sent off in the 45th minute for the Aussies, ultimately led to their securing one of the best third place runner up spots as they would lose their next two matches.

United States goalkeeper Brianna Scurry was sent off in the 88th minute of the second group game against Denmark. With all three substitutions used, U.S. manager Tony DiCicco called upon striker Mia Hamm to play goalkeeper. Hamm made two saves over eight minutes of stoppage time to secure the 2–0 win. In the other game, Angela Iannotta scored Australia's first-ever World Cup goal, but China defeated the Matildas 4–2.

6 June 1995
19:00

United States	3–3	China
Venturini 22'; Milbrett 34'; Hamm 51'	Report	Wang Liping 38'; Wei Haiying 74'; Sun Wen 79'

Strömvallen, Gävle
Attendance: 4,635
Referee: Ingrid Jonsson (Sweden)
6 June 1995
19:00

Denmark	5–0	Australia
Krogh 12', 48'; Eggers Nielsen 25'; Jensen 37'; C. Hansen 86'	Report

Arosvallen, Västerås
Attendance: 1,500
Referee: Bente Skogvang (Norway)

8 June 1995
19:00

United States	2–0	Denmark
Lilly 9'; Milbrett 49'	Report

Strömvallen, Gävle
Attendance: 2,704
Referee: Engage Camara (Guinea)
8 June 1995
19:00

China	4–2	Australia
Zhou Yang 23'; Shi Guihong 54', 78'; Liu Ailing 90+3'	Report	Iannotta 25'; Hughes 89'

Arosvallen, Västerås
Attendance: 1,500
Referee: Maria Edilene Siqueira (Brazil)

10 June 1995
16:00

United States	4–1	Australia
Foudy 69'; Fawcett 72'; Overbeck 90+2' (pen.); Keller 90+4'	Report	Casagrande 54'

Olympia, Helsingborg
Attendance: 1,105
Referee: Pirom Un-prasert (Thailand)
10 June 1995
16:00

China	3–1	Denmark
Shi Guihong 21'; Sun Wen 76'; Wei Haiying 90'	Report	Bonde 44'

Arosvallen, Västerås
Attendance: 1,619
Referee: Eduardo Gamboa (Chile)

=== Ranking of third-placed teams ===
Pos	Grp	Team	Pld	W	D	L	GF	GA	GD	Pts	Qualification
1	C	Denmark	3	1	0	2	6	5	+1	3	Advance to knockout stage
2	A	Japan	3	1	0	2	2	4	−2	3	Advance to knockout stage
3	B	Canada	3	0	1	2	5	13	−8	1	

Source: FIFA
Rules for classification: 1) Points; 2) Goal difference; 3) Goals scored.

== Knockout stage ==
=== Bracket ===
Quarter-finals
13 June – Västerås
Germany	3
England	0
13 June – Helsingborg
Sweden	1 (3)
China (p)	1 (4)
13 June – Gävle
Japan	0
United States	4
13 June – Karlstad
Norway	3
Denmark	1

Semi-finals
15 June – Helsingborg
Germany	1
China	0
15 June – Västerås
United States	0
Norway	1

Final
18 June – Solna
Germany	0
Norway	2
Third place play-off
17 June – Gävle
China	0
United States	2

=== Quarter-finals ===
13 June 1995
17:15

Japan	0–4	United States
	Report	Lilly 8', 42'; Milbrett 45'; Venturini 80'

Strömvallen, Gävle
Attendance: 3,756
Referee: Eduardo Gamboa (Chile)

13 June 1995
17:15

Norway	3–1	Denmark
Espeseth 21'; Medalen 64'; Riise 85'	Report	Krogh 86'

Tingvalla IP, Karlstad
Attendance: 4,655
Referee: Pirom Un-prasert (Thailand)

13 June 1995
20:15

Germany	3–0	England
Voss 41'; Meinert 55'; Mohr 82'	Report

Arosvallen, Västerås
Attendance: 2,317
Referee: Bente Skogvang (Norway)

13 June 1995
20:15

Sweden	1–1 (a.e.t.)	China
Kalte 90+3'	Report	Sun Qingmei 29'
Penalties
Andersson (penalty missed); Videkull (penalty scored); Pohjanen (penalty scored); Sundhage (penalty scored); Nessvold (penalty missed)	3–4	(penalty scored) Sun Wen; (penalty scored) Xie Huilin; (penalty scored) Chen Yufeng; (penalty scored) Shui Qingxia; (penalty missed) Liu Ailing

Olympia, Helsingborg
Attendance: 7,537
Referee: Sonia Denoncourt (Canada)

=== Semi-finals ===
15 June 1995
17:15

United States	0–1	Norway
	Report	Aarønes 10'

Arosvallen, Västerås
Attendance: 2,893
Referee: Alain Hamer (Luxembourg)

15 June 1995
20:15

Germany	1–0	China
Wiegmann 88'	Report

Olympia, Helsingborg
Attendance: 3,693
Referee: Petros Mathabela (South Africa)

=== Third place play-off ===
17 June 1995
16:00

China	0–2	United States
	Report	Venturini 24'; Hamm 55'

Strömvallen, Gävle
Attendance: 4,335
Referee: Sonia Denoncourt (Canada)

=== Final ===
18 June 1995
18:00

Germany	0–2	Norway
	Report	Riise 37'; Pettersen 40'

Råsunda Stadium, Solna
Attendance: 17,158
Referee: Ingrid Jonsson (Sweden)

== Awards ==
The following awards were given at the conclusion of the tournament:

Golden Ball	Silver Ball	Bronze Ball
(Norway) Hege Riise	(Norway) Gro Espeseth	(Norway) Ann Kristin Aarønes
Golden Shoe	Silver Shoe	Bronze Shoe
(Norway) Ann Kristin Aarønes	(Norway) Hege Riise	(China) Shi Guihong
6 goals, 0 assists	5 goals, 5 assists	3 goals, 2 assists
FIFA Fair Play Award
Sweden

== Statistics ==
=== Goalscorers ===
There were 99 goals scored in 26 matches, for an average of 3.81 goals per match. Ann Kristin Aarønes of Norway won the Golden Shoe award for scoring six goals.

6 goals

- (Norway) Ann Kristin Aarønes

5 goals

- (Norway) Hege Riise

3 goals

- (China) Shi Guihong
- (Denmark) Gitte Krogh
- (Germany) Heidi Mohr
- (Germany) Bettina Wiegmann
- (Norway) Marianne Pettersen
- (Norway) Kristin Sandberg
- (United States) Kristine Lilly
- (United States) Tiffeny Milbrett
- (United States) Tisha Venturini

2 goals

- (Brazil) Roseli
- (Canada) Silvana Burtini
- (Canada) Geri Donnelly
- (China) Sun Wen
- (China) Wei Haiying
- (England) Gillian Coultard
- (England) Karen Farley
- (Germany) Maren Meinert
- (Japan) Akemi Noda
- (Nigeria) Rita Nwadike
- (Nigeria) Adaku Okoroafor
- (Norway) Linda Medalen
- (Sweden) Malin Andersson
- (United States) Mia Hamm

1 goal

- (Australia) Lisa Casagrande
- (Australia) Sunni Hughes
- (Australia) Angela Iannotta
- (Brazil) Pretinha
- (Canada) Helen Stoumbos
- (China) Liu Ailing
- (China) Sun Qingmei
- (China) Wang Liping
- (China) Zhou Yang
- (Denmark) Christina Bonde
- (Denmark) Anne Dot Eggers Nielsen
- (Denmark) Christina Hansen
- (Denmark) Helle Jensen
- (England) Marieanne Spacey
- (England) Karen Walker
- (Germany) Anouschka Bernhard
- (Germany) Ursula Lohn
- (Germany) Silvia Neid
- (Germany) Birgit Prinz
- (Germany) Martina Voss
- (Nigeria) Patience Avre
- (Norway) Gro Espeseth
- (Norway) Tone Haugen
- (Norway) Randi Leinan
- (Norway) Tina Svensson
- (Sweden) Anneli Andelén
- (Sweden) Ulrika Kalte
- (Sweden) Pia Sundhage
- (Sweden) Lena Videkull
- (United States) Joy Fawcett
- (United States) Julie Foudy
- (United States) Debbie Keller
- (United States) Carla Overbeck

=== Assists ===
6 assists

- (United States) Mia Hamm

5 assists

- (Norway) Hege Riise

3 assists

- (Canada) Charmaine Hooper
- (Norway) Tone Haugen
- (Norway) Linda Medalen

2 assists

- (Brazil) Pretinha
- (China) Liu Ailing
- (China) Shi Guihong
- (China) Zhao Lihong
- (Denmark) Birgit Christensen
- (Germany) Patricia Brocker
- (Germany) Ursula Lohn
- (Norway) Gro Espeseth
- (Norway) Tina Svensson
- (Sweden) Malin Andersson
- (United States) Carin Jennings-Gabarra

1 assist

- (Australia) Lizzy Claydon
- (Australia) Sunni Hughes
- (Brazil) Fanta
- (Canada) Silvana Burtini
- (China) Sun Qingmei
- (China) Sun Wen
- (China) Wei Haiying
- (Denmark) Jeanne Axelsen
- (Denmark) Annette Laursen
- (Denmark) Lene Madsen
- (England) Karen Farley
- (England) Hope Powell
- (England) Marieanne Spacey
- (Germany) Anouschka Bernhard
- (Germany) Maren Meinert
- (Germany) Heidi Mohr
- (Germany) Martina Voss
- (Germany) Bettina Wiegmann
- (Japan) Nami Otake
- (Japan) Rie Yamaki
- (Nigeria) Patience Avre
- (Nigeria) Maureen Mmadu
- (Nigeria) Rita Nwadike
- (Norway) Merete Myklebust
- (Norway) Marianne Pettersen
- (Norway) Heidi Støre
- (Sweden) Malin Flink
- (Sweden) Ulrika Kalte
- (Sweden) Helen Nilsson
- (United States) Joy Fawcett
- (United States) Kristine Lilly
- (United States) Tisha Venturini

Source: FIFA Technical Report

=== Tournament ranking ===
Per statistical convention in football, matches decided in extra time are counted as wins and losses, while matches decided by penalty shoot-outs are counted as draws.

Pos	Grp	Team	Pld	W	D	L	GF	GA	GD	Pts	Final result
1	B	Norway	6	6	0	0	23	1	+22	18	Champions
2	A	Germany	6	4	0	2	13	6	+7	12	Runners-up
3	C	United States	6	4	1	1	15	5	+10	13	Third place
4	C	China	6	2	2	2	11	10	+1	8	Fourth place
5	A	Sweden (H)	4	2	1	1	6	4	+2	7	Eliminated in quarter-finals (Note: Teams eliminated in the quarter-finals are ranked by their quarter-final goal differential.)
6	C	Denmark	4	1	0	3	7	8	−1	3	Eliminated in quarter-finals
7	B	England	4	2	0	2	6	9	−3	6	Eliminated in quarter-finals
8	A	Japan	4	1	0	3	2	8	−6	3	Eliminated in quarter-finals
9	A	Brazil	3	1	0	2	3	8	−5	3	Eliminated in group stage
10	B	Canada	3	0	1	2	5	13	−8	1	Eliminated in group stage
11	B	Nigeria	3	0	1	2	5	14	−9	1	Eliminated in group stage
12	C	Australia	3	0	0	3	3	13	−10	0	Eliminated in group stage

Source: FIFA Technical Report
(H) Hosts
