= Kim Lembryk =

Australian soccer player (born 1966)

Personal information
- Date of birth: 19 February 1966 (age 60)
- Position: Midfielder

Senior career*
| Years | Team | Apps | (Gls) |
- Marconi Stallions

International career^{‡}
- Australia
- * Club domestic league appearances and goals ‡ National team caps and goals as of 5 June 1995 (before the 1995 FIFA Women's World Cup)

Kim Lembryk (born 19 February 1966) is an Australian former footballer who played as a midfielder for the Australia women's national soccer team. She was part of the team at the 1995 FIFA Women's World Cup. At the club level, she played for Marconi Stallions in Australia.
