= Jens Harskov Loczi =

Danish sports shooter (born 1963)

Personal information
- Nationality: Danish
- Born: 23 July 1963 (age 62)

Sport
- Sport: Sports shooting

Jens Harskov Loczi (born 23 July 1963) is a Danish sports shooter. He competed at the 1992 Summer Olympics and the 1996 Summer Olympics.
