= Rikke Holm =

Danish footballer (born 1972)

Rikke Holm Brink
Personal information
- Date of birth: 22 March 1972 (age 54)
- Place of birth: Denmark
- Positions: Defender; midfielder

Senior career*
Years	Team	Apps	(Gls)
1991–1994	B 1909		
1995	OB		
1996–1997	HEI		
1997–	FB		

International career
1990–1998	Denmark	60	(9)
- * Club domestic league appearances and goals

Rikke Holm Brink (born 22 March 1972) is a Danish physiotherapist and former footballer who played as a defender and midfielder. She currently works as the physiotherapist for the Denmark women's national football team. Holm played for various clubs in the Danish league, including OB, and HEI, with whom she won the league in 1997.

Holm earned 60 caps and scored 9 goals for the Denmark national team. She competed in the 1996 Summer Olympics, playing 3 matches, the 1991 FIFA World Cup, and at the 1995 FIFA World Cup.

== After football ==
Holm became a physiotherapist and works for the Denmark women's national football team.

== See also ==
- Denmark at the 1996 Summer Olympics
