= Lizzy Claydon =

Australian soccer player

Personal information
- Date of birth: 11 November 1972 (age 53)
- Position: Forward

Senior career*
Years	Team	Apps	(Gls)
- Stirling Vasto

International career^{‡}
- Australia
- * Club domestic league appearances and goals ‡ National team caps and goals as of 5 June 1995 (before the 1995 FIFA Women's World Cup)

Lizzy Claydon (born 11 November 1972) is an Australian former footballer who played as a forward for the Australia women's national soccer team. She was part of the team at the 1995 FIFA Women's World Cup. At the club level, she played for Stirling Vasto in Australia.
