= Hisae Yoshizawa =

Japanese football referee

- Born: 9 November 1966 (age 59); Shinagawa, Tokyo, Japan

Domestic
Years	League	Role
1988–2010	Japan Football Association	Referee

International
Years	League	Role
1995–2010	FIFA listed	Referee

Hisae Yoshizawa (吉澤 久恵, Yoshizawa Hisae; born 9 November 1966) is a Japanese football referee. She primarily served as an assistant referee and officiated in 117 international matches, including several editions of the FIFA Women's World Cup and the AFC Women's Asian Cup. She earned her first referee qualification from the Japan Football Association in 1988 and was registered as an international women's football referee in 1995. She won the AFC Assistant Referee of the Year Award in 2000 and received the AFC Distinguished Service Award Bronze Star in 2007.
