= Christina Petersen =

Danish footballer (born 1974)

Personal information
- Full name: Christina Bendt Petersen
- Date of birth: 17 September 1974 (age 52)
- Place of birth: Denmark
- Position: Midfielder

Youth career
- –1990: Vodskov

Senior career*
Years	Team	Apps	(Gls)
1991–2002	Fortuna Hjørring	352	

International career
1992-2001	Denmark	70	(10)
- * Club domestic league appearances and goals

Christina Bendt Petersen (born 17 September 1974) is a Danish former football midfielder who played for the Denmark women's national football team. Bonde competed at the 1996 Summer Olympics, playing three matches. She played 352 matches for Fortuna Hjørring.

== See also ==
- Denmark at the 1996 Summer Olympics
