= Malin Flink =

Swedish footballer

Personal information
- Date of birth: 4 September 1974 (age 52)
- Position: Midfielder

Senior career*
Years	Team	Apps	(Gls)
- Gideonsbergs IF

International career^{‡}
- Sweden
- * Club domestic league appearances and goals ‡ National team caps and goals as of 5 June 1995 (before the 1995 FIFA Women's World Cup)

Malin Flink (born 4 September 1974) is a Swedish footballer who played as a midfielder for the Sweden women's national football team. She was part of the team at the 1995 FIFA Women's World Cup. On club level she played for Gideonsbergs IF in Sweden.
