= Michelle Watson =

Australian soccer player

Personal information
- Date of birth: 17 June 1976 (age 50)
- Position: Forward

Senior career*
Years	Team	Apps	(Gls)
- Marconi Stallions

International career^{‡}
- Australia
- * Club domestic league appearances and goals ‡ National team caps and goals as of 5 June 1995 (before the 1995 FIFA Women's World Cup)

Michelle Watson (born 17 June 1976) is an Australian former footballer who played as a forward for the Australia women's national soccer team. She was part of the team at the 1994 OFC Women's Championship and 1995 FIFA Women's World Cup. At the club level, she played for Marconi Stallions in Australia.
