= Ma Yuanan =

Chinese footballer and manager

Personal information
- Date of birth: 9 April 1945 (age 81)

Managerial career
- Years: Team
- 1992–2001: China Women

Ma Yuanan (Chinese: 马元安; pinyin: Mǎ Yuánān; born 9 April 1945) is a Chinese former footballer and manager.

== Career ==
Ma played football before retiring in 1975, and began coaching afterwards. He was the head coach of the China women's national team from 1992 until 2001. He led the team at four major international tournaments, the 1995 FIFA Women's World Cup, 1996 Summer Olympics, 1999 FIFA Women's World Cup and 2000 Summer Olympics.
