= Holly Manthei =

American footballer (born 1976)

Personal information
- Full name: Holly Jean Manthei
- Date of birth: February 8, 1976 (age 50)
- Place of birth: Edina, Minnesota, U.S.
- Height: 5 ft 9 in (1.75 m)
- Positions: Midfielder; forward

College career
Years	Team	Apps	(Gls)
1994–1997	Notre Dame Fighting Irish	100	(24)

International career
1995–1997	United States	23	(0)
Medal record
FIFA Women's World Cup
Bronze medal – third place	1995 USA	Team competition

Holly Jean Manthei (born February 8, 1976) is an American retired soccer midfielder-forward and former member of the United States women's national soccer team.

== Early life ==
Manthei was born in Edina, Minnesota, and grew up in nearby Burnsville. She attended Burnsville High School where she led the team to two consecutive state soccer championships and three straight championship appearances. Manthei was a three-time all-state performer in soccer while earning the same honor in track twice and basketball once. She was also a member of Burnsville's 1992 state championship basketball squad and won the state title in the 300-meter hurdles in track and field in 1993. In 1994, she was named a Parade High School All-American. She was named one of the first 20 members of the Burnsville High School Hall of Fame that were inducted during the school's 50th anniversary celebration in August 2006. She was named to the Minnesota State High School League Hall of Fame Class of 2024.

=== University of Notre Dame ===
During her first year, she earned consensus second-team All American honors and led the nation in assists with 30, the second highest single-season mark in women's college history. She had had eight multiple-assist games and scored a point in 21 of 25 games. She finished the season first-team all-Midwestern Collegiate Conference, all-newcomer and newcomer of the year.

As a sophomore, she led the Notre Dame Fighting Irish to a National Championship. She was named First-team Soccer News and First-team NSCAA All-American, as well as Soccer America's Collegiate MVP team. She was a finalist for national player of the year awards and led the nation for a second season with 21 assists.

As a junior, she started all 21 games and was named to the NSCAA All American third-team. She led the nation with 44 assists, the highest single-season mark in women's college soccer history breaking Mia Hamm's mark of 33 set in 1992. Making its third straight appearance in the NCAA championship game, the Irish lost 0-1 to the North Carolina Tar Heels.

During her senior year, Manthei captained the Fighting Irish, helping her team to their fourth consecutive NCAA tournament. She was a finalist for the Hermann Trophy and Missouri Athletic Club Player of the Year Award. She ended her college career with three all-time NCAA assist records for career (129), season (44), and postseason (9).

== Playing career ==
=== International ===
Manthei played for the United States women's national soccer team from 1995–1996. She made her first appearance for the senior national team on February 24, 1995, in a match against Denmark. In 1995, she was part of the team that won bronze at the Women's World Cup. She earned a total of 23 international caps.
