= Kamma Flæng =

Danish retired footballer (born 1976)

Personal information
- Date of birth: 30 March 1976 (age 50)
- Place of birth: Denmark
- Position: Defender

Senior career*
Years	Team	Apps	(Gls)
1996	HEI		

International career
1996	Denmark	21 (?)	
- * Club domestic league appearances and goals

Kamma Bodil Flæng (born 30 March 1976) is a Danish retired football defender. She was part of the Denmark women's national football team. She competed at the 1996 Summer Olympics, playing three matches. At the club level, she played for HEI Århus.

== See also ==
- Denmark at the 1996 Summer Olympics
