= Merete Myklebust =

Norwegian footballer (born 1973)

Medal record

Representing Norway

Women's football

Olympic Games
Bronze medal – third place	1996 Atlanta	Team

Merete Myklebust (born 16 May 1973 in Ålesund) is a former Norwegian footballer, world champion, and olympic medalist.

She debuted for the Norwegian national team in 1993 and played 60 matches for the national team.

She received a bronze medal at the 1996 Summer Olympics in Atlanta.
