= Dorthe Larsen =

Danish footballer (born 1969)

Personal information
- Date of birth: 8 August 1969 (age 57)
- Place of birth: Denmark
- Position: Goalkeeper

Senior career*
Years	Team	Apps	(Gls)
1989–	Fortuna Hjørring	396	

International career
1993–2005	Denmark	65	(0)
- * Club domestic league appearances and goals

Dorthe Nielsen (née Larsen; born 8 August 1969) is a Danish former footballer who played as a goalkeeper for Fortuna Hjørring and the Denmark women's national football team. She competed at the 1996 Summer Olympics, playing 3 matches. Larsen is the second most capped player in Fortuna's history, having amassed 396 caps for the club.

== See also ==
- Denmark at the 1996 Summer Olympics
