= Jeanne Axelsen =

Danish footballer (born 1968)

Personal information
- Date of birth: 3 January 1968 (age 58)
- Position: Midfielder

Senior career*
Years	Team	Apps	(Gls)
1995–1998	Rødovre BK		
1999–	FB		

International career
1994–1999	Denmark	35	(4)
- * Club domestic league appearances and goals

Jeanne Axelsen (born 3 January 1968) is a Danish footballer who played as a midfielder for the Denmark women's national football team. She was part of the team at the 1995 FIFA Women's World Cup and 1999 FIFA Women's World Cup.
