= Strömvallen =

Football stadium in Gävle, Sweden

Coordinates: 60°40′22″N 17°7′43″E

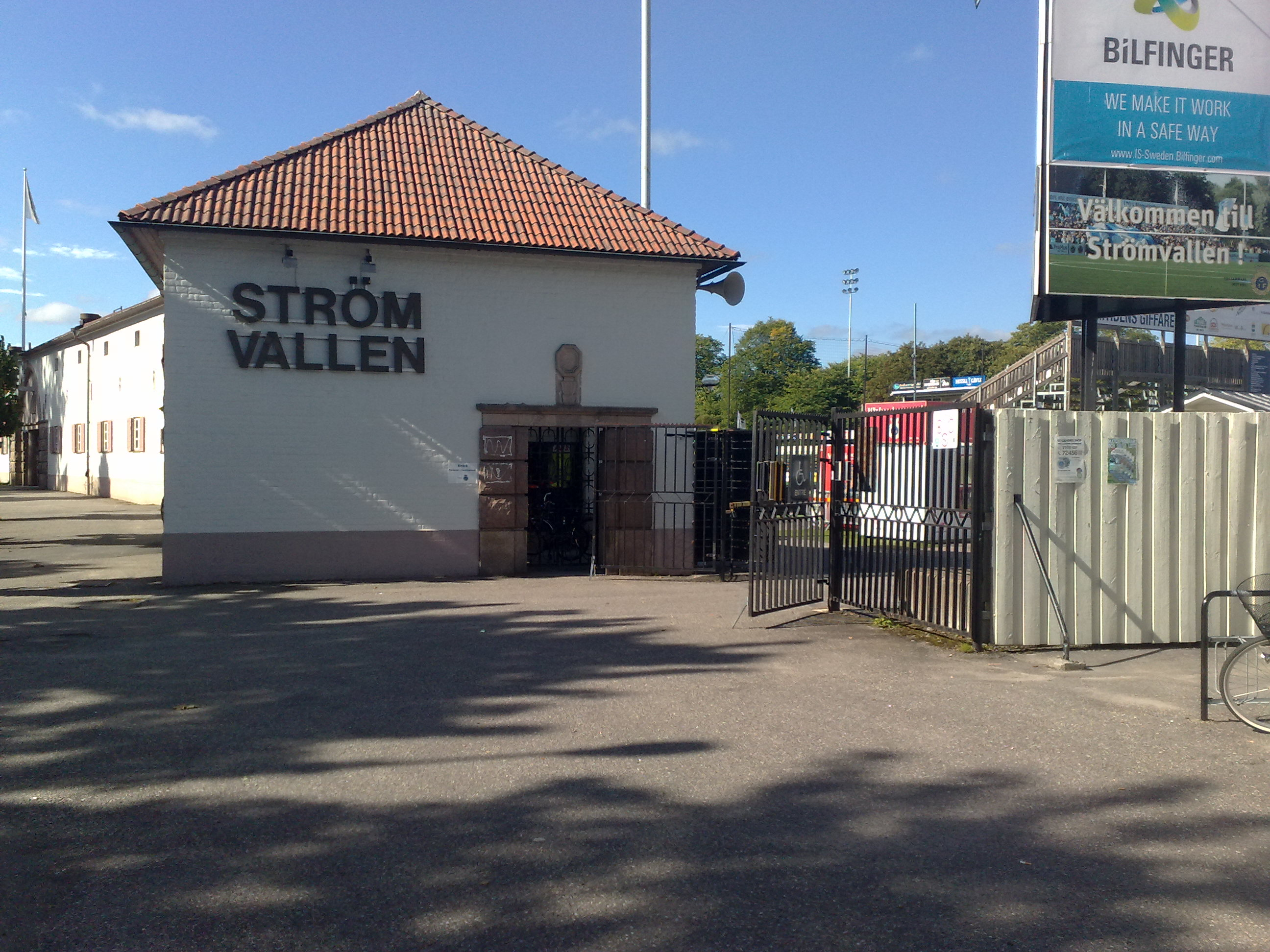
- Strömvallen football stadium in Gävle, Sweden.
- Interactive map of Strömvallen
- Location: Gävle, Sweden
- Owner: Gävle Municipality
- Capacity: 6,703

Construction
- Opened: 1903
- Architect: Erik Westergren

Tenant
- Gefle IF (1923–2015)

Strömvallen is a football stadium in Gävle, Sweden. It was the home ground of Gefle IF until 2015. The stadium holds 6,703 people and was initially opened in 1903, with a dedicated spectator area built in 1923.

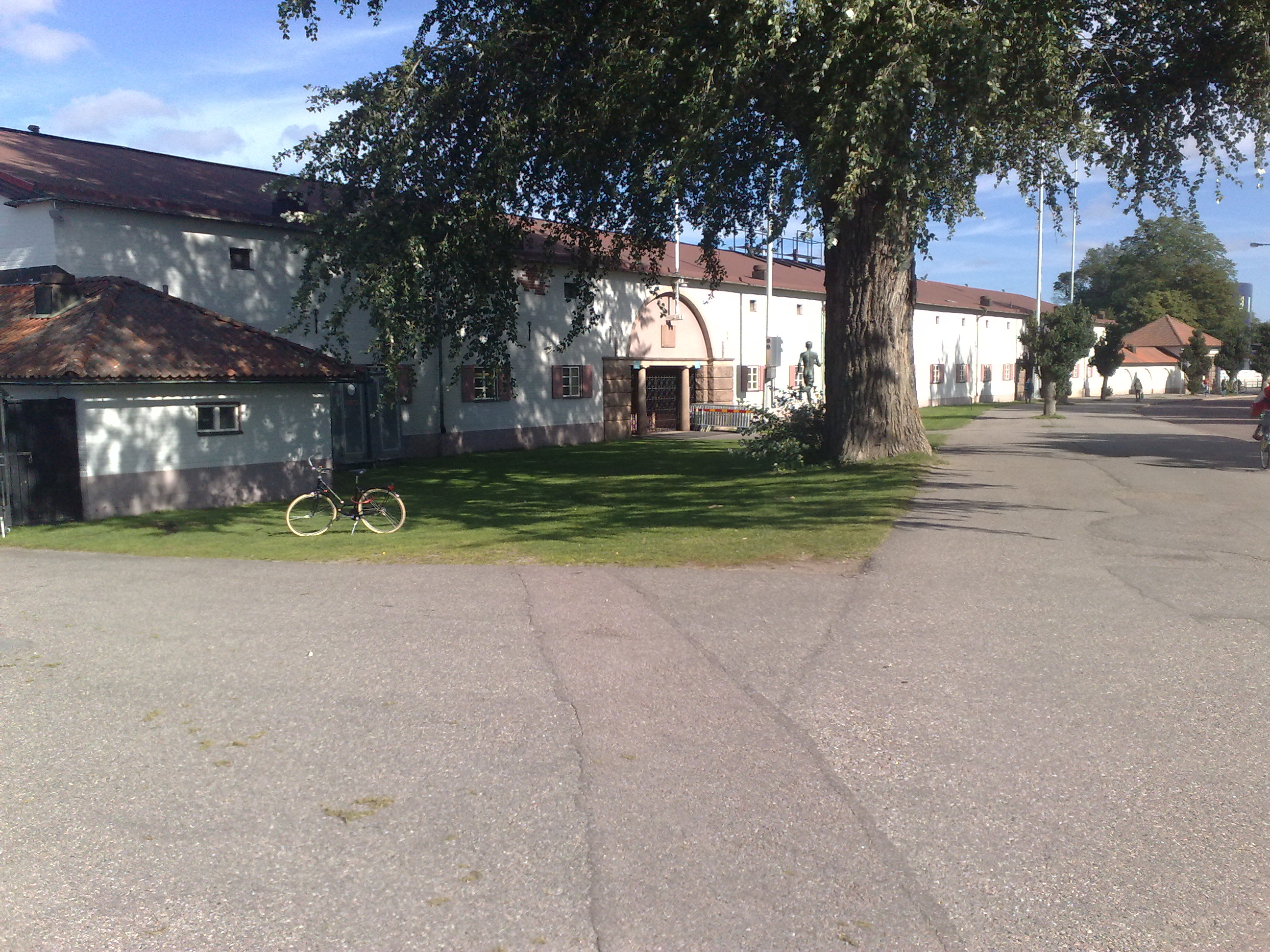
Strömvallen football stadium in Gävle, Sweden.

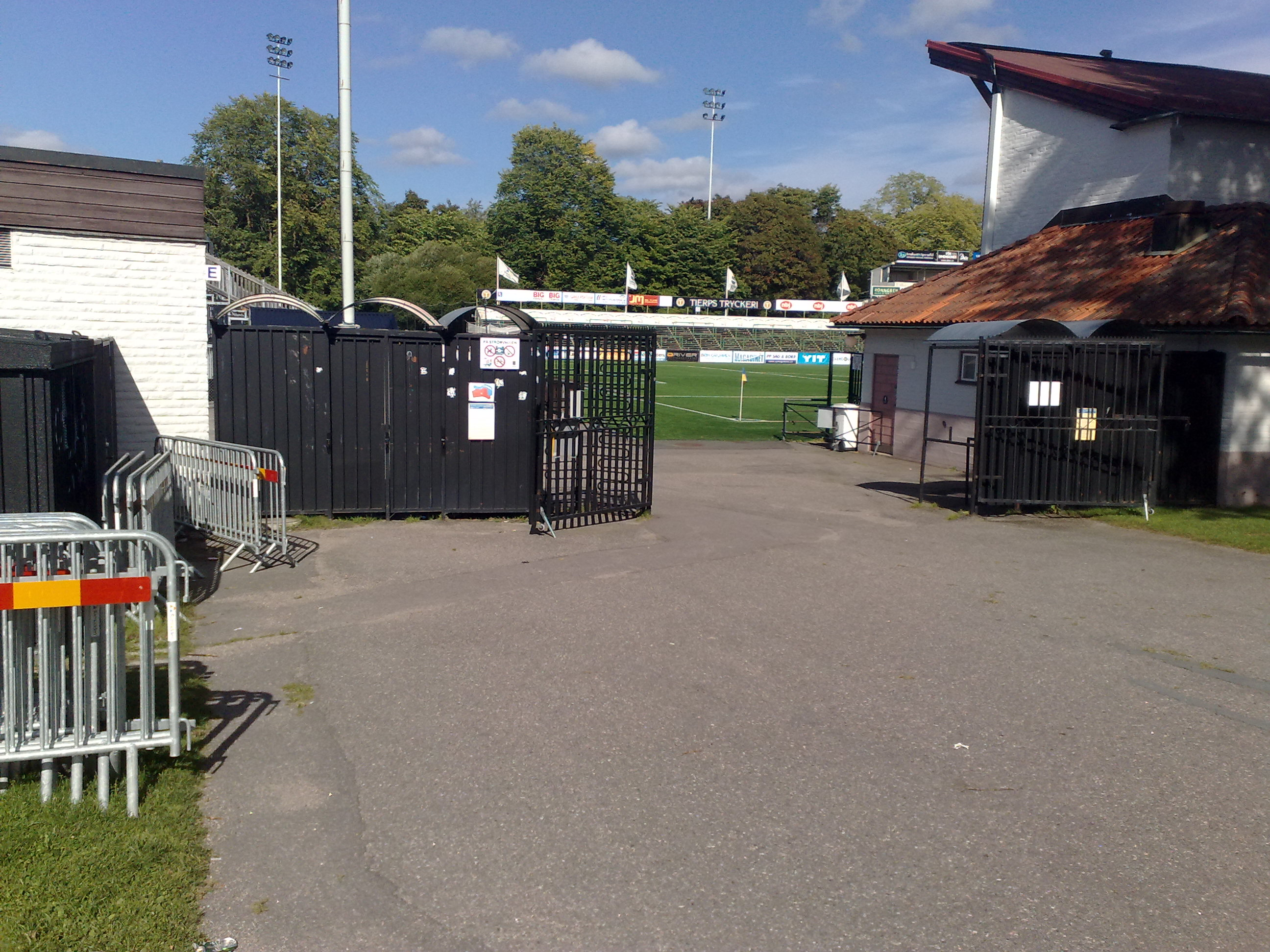
Strömvallen football stadium in Gävle, Sweden.

== 1995 FIFA Women's World Cup matches ==
Date	Time (UTC+01)	Team No. 1	Res.	Team No. 2	Round	Attendance
6 June 1995	19:00	United States	3–3	China	Group C	4,635
8 June 1995	19:00	United States	2–0	Denmark	Group C	2,704
10 June 1995	16:00	Norway	7–0	Canada	Group B	2,715
13 June 1995	17:15	Japan	0–4	United States	Quarter-finals	3,756
17 June 1995	16:00	China	0–2	United States	Third Place	4,335
