= Sonia Gegenhuber =

Australian soccer player (born 1970)

Personal information
- Date of birth: 28 September 1970 (age 56)
- Place of birth: South Australia, Australia
- Position: Defender

International career^{‡}
Years	Team	Apps	(Gls)
1989–1999	Australia	60	(1)
- ‡ National team caps and goals as of 1999

Sonia Gegenhuber is a retired Australian soccer player who played 75 times (including 60 full international matches) for Australia and was a national captain.

== Early life ==
Gegenhuber grew up in Mannum, South Australia where she began playing soccer alongside her three brothers.

== Playing career ==
After spending time playing in Adelaide for Brahma Lodge, Gegenhuber moved to Queensland. She had stints with Coalstars, Eastern Suburbs and QAS Sting.

Gegenhuber made her debut for Australia in 1989. At the 1995 FIFA Women's World Cup, she made two appearances. She made her final appearance for Australia in 1999, have made 75 appearances, including 60 in full international matches.

== Honours ==
In 2013, Football Federation Australia named Gegenhuber as part their women's team of the decade for the years 1990 to 1999.

In 2018, she was inducted into the FFA Hall of Fame. 2000 Australian Sports Medal
