= Arosvallen =

Sports venue in Västerås, Sweden

Coordinates: 59°37′14″N 16°32′28″E

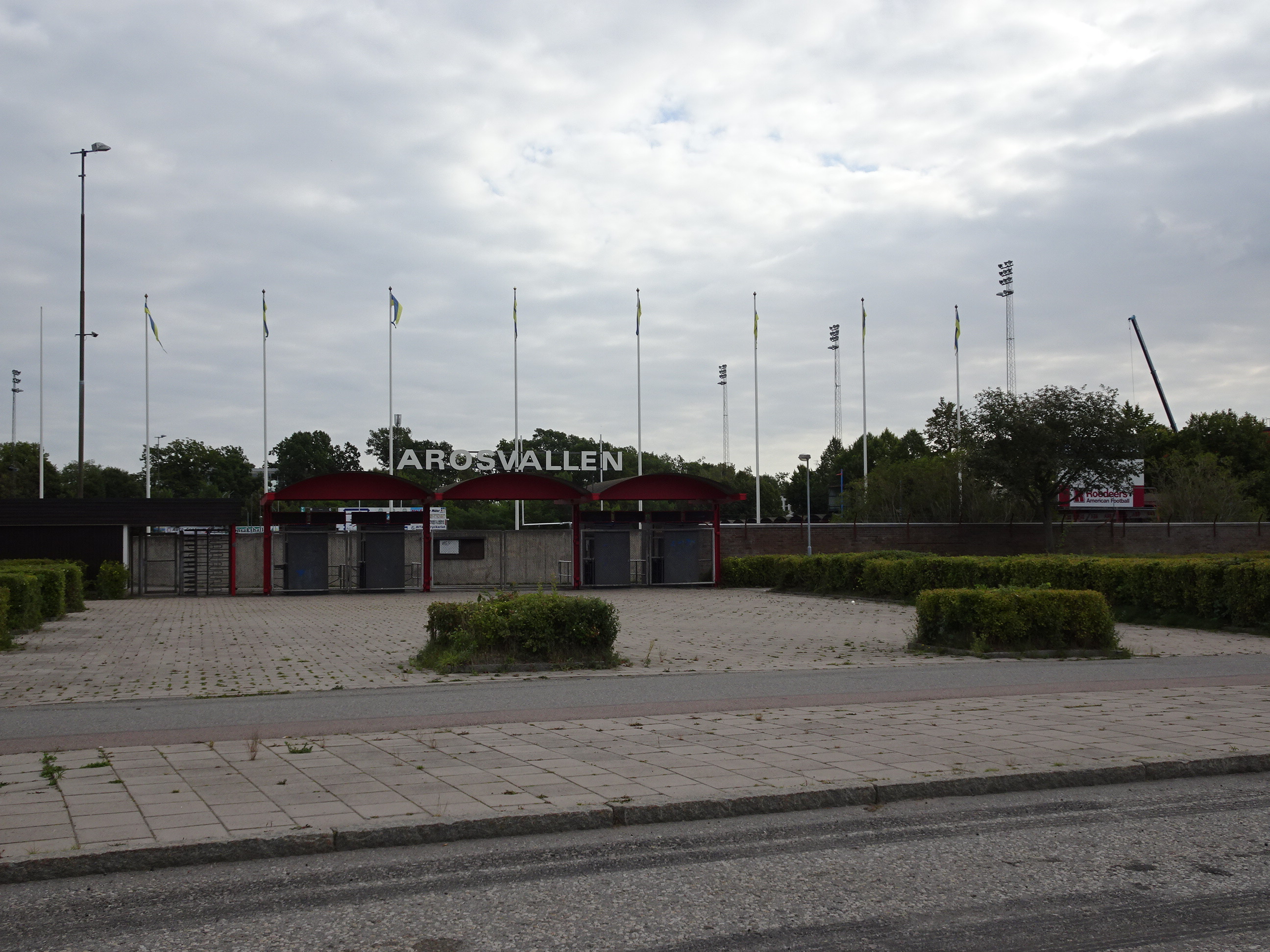
- Arosvallen in September 2016
- Interactive map of Arosvallen
- Location: Västerås, Sweden
- Capacity: 10,605

Construction
- Opened: 21 June 1931

Tenants
- IFK Västerås, Västerås SK

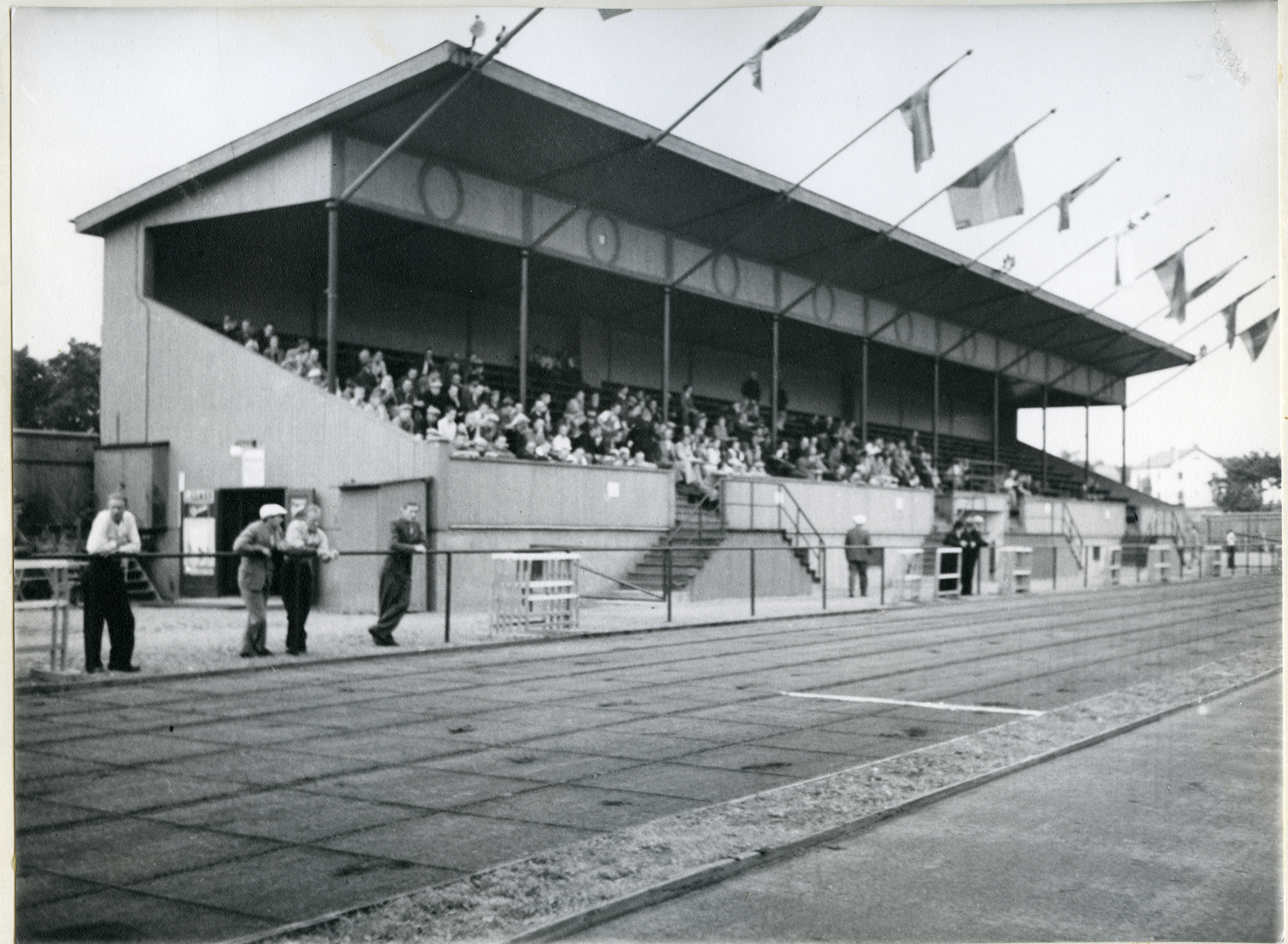
The Arosvallen main stand in 1937.

Arosvallen is a multi-use stadium in Västerås, Sweden. It is mostly used for football, though it is also the home stadium for the Division 1 American football team Västerås Roedeers.

The stadium hosted two 1958 FIFA World Cup games, Yugoslavia - Scotland and Yugoslavia - France. It also hosted four group matches, a quarterfinal, and a semifinal in the 1995 FIFA Women's World Cup.

On 18 February 1934, Arosvallen set an attendance record for the Swedish men's top bandy division, with 11,231 spectators watching Västerås SK–IFK Uppsala (1–5).

== 1958 FIFA World Cup matches ==
Date	Time (UTC+01)	Team No. 1	Res.	Team No. 2	Round	Attendance
8 June 1958	19:00	Yugoslavia	1–1	Scotland	Group 2	9,591
11 June 1958	19:00	Yugoslavia	3–2	France	Group B	12,217

== 1995 FIFA Women's World Cup matches ==
Date	Time (UTC+01)	Team No. 1	Res.	Team No. 2	Round	Attendance
6 June 1995	19:00	Denmark	5–0	Australia	Group C	1,500
8 June 1995	19:00	China	4–2	Australia	Group C	1,500
9 June 1995	19:00	Sweden	2–0	Japan	Group A	7,811
10 June 1995	16:00	China	3–1	Denmark	Group C	5,520
13 June 1995	20:15	Germany	3–0	England	Quarter-finals	2,317
13 June 1995	20:15	United States	0–1	Norway	Semi-finals	2,893
