= Xie Huilin =

Chinese footballer

Medal record

Women's football

Representing China

Olympic Games
Silver medal – second place	1996 Atlanta	Team

Asian Games
Gold medal – first place	1998 Bangkok	Team

Xie Huilin (simplified Chinese: 谢惠琳; traditional Chinese: 謝惠琳; pinyin: Xiè Huìlín; born January 17, 1975) is a female Chinese football (soccer) player who competed in the 1996 Summer Olympics and in the 2000 Summer Olympics.

In 1996 she won the silver medal with the Chinese team. She played all five matches.

Four years later she was a member of the Chinese team which finished fifth in the women's tournament. She played two matches.
