= Annette Laursen =

Danish footballer (born 1975)

Personal information
- Date of birth: 6 February 1975 (age 51)
- Place of birth: Denmark
- Position: Defender

Senior career*
Years	Team	Apps	(Gls)
1995–2001	HEI		
2001–	IK Skovbakken		

International career
1993–2002	Denmark	23	(0)
- * Club domestic league appearances and goals

Annette Meineche Jørgensen (née Laursen; born 6 February 1975) is a Danish physiotherapist, football coach and former footballer who played as a defender.

She was part of the Denmark women's national football team. She competed at the 1996 Summer Olympics, playing 3 matches. At club level she played for HEI and IK Skovbakken.

== After football ==
Meineche trained as a physiotherapist following her active playing career. She also coached the U-10s for Vejle B.

== See also ==
- Denmark at the 1996 Summer Olympics
