= Birgit Christensen =

Danish footballer (born 1976)

Personal information
- Full name: Birgit Melgaard Christensen
- Date of birth: 31 May 1976 (age 50)
- Place of birth: Denmark
- Position: Midfielder

Senior career*
Years	Team	Apps	(Gls)
- B52/Aalborg FC
1993–	Fortuna Hjørring		

International career
1992	Denmark U17	6	(0)
1993	Denmark U21	8	(1)
1994–1999	Denmark	48	(8)
- * Club domestic league appearances and goals

Birgit Melgaard Christensen (born 31 May 1976) is a former Danish footballer who played as a midfielder. Christensen earned 48 caps and scored goals for the Denmark women's national football team. She was the chairman of Fortuna Hjørring from 2019 to 2023.

She competed at the 1996 Summer Olympics, playing 3 matches.

== After football ==
Christensen trained as a painter alongside playing football and owned her own business from 2006 to 2026.

== See also ==
- Denmark at the 1996 Summer Olympics
