= Chen Yufeng (footballer) =

Chinese footballer (born 1970)

Chen Yufeng (Chinese: 陈玉凤)
Personal information
- Date of birth: January 17, 1970 (age 56)
- Place of birth: Yantai, Shandong
- Height: 1.65 m (5 ft 5 in)

International career
Years	Team	Apps	(Gls)
1995-1996	China WNT	7	(0)
Medal record
Women's football
Representing China
Olympic Games
Silver medal – second place	1996 Atlanta	Team
Asian Games
Gold medal – first place	1994 Hiroshima	Team

Chen Yufeng (Chinese: 陈玉凤, born January 17, 1970) is a female Chinese football (soccer) player who competed in the 1996 Summer Olympics.

In 1996 she won the silver medal with the Chinese team. She played two matches.
