= Lene Madsen =

Danish footballer (born 1973)

Personal information
- Date of birth: 11 March 1973 (age 53)
- Place of birth: Denmark
- Position: Forward

Senior career*
Years	Team	Apps	(Gls)
1993–2003	Fortuna Hjørring	315	(357)

International career
1996	Denmark	26 (?)	
- * Club domestic league appearances and goals

Lene Madsen (born 11 March 1973) is a Danish former football forward who played for the Denmark women's national football team. She competed at the 1996 Summer Olympics, playing three matches. At club level, Madsen played for Fortuna Hjørring. She was with the club for a decade and is their all-time topscorer with 357 goals in all competitions.

== See also ==
- Denmark at the 1996 Summer Olympics
