= Christina Hansen (footballer) =

Danish footballer (born 1970)

Personal information
- Date of birth: 5 June 1970 (age 56)
- Position: Forward

International career^{‡}
Years	Team	Apps	(Gls)
- Denmark
- ‡ National team caps and goals as of 5 June 1995 (before the 1995 FIFA Women's World Cup)

Christina Hansen (born 5 June 1970) is a Danish footballer who played as a forward for the Denmark women's national football team. She was part of the team at the 1995 FIFA Women's World Cup.
