= Angela Iannotta =

Italian Australian soccer player and coach

Personal information
- Full name: Angela Iannotta
- Date of birth: 22 March 1971 (age 55)
- Place of birth: Myrtleford, Australia
- Height: 1.58 m (5 ft 2 in)
- Position: Forward

Senior career*
Years	Team	Apps	(Gls)
- Melrose Park Rangers
- Albury City
- Albury United
1992–1996	ACF Agliana		
1996–1997	Panasonic Bambina		
1997–1998	Autolelli Picenum		
1998–1999	Canberra Eclipse		
- Autolelli Picenum

International career^{‡}
1991–1999	Australia	33	(10)
- * Club domestic league appearances and goals as of 21:44, 11 January 2014 (UTC) ‡ National team caps and goals as of 21:44, 11 January 2014 (UTC)

Angela Iannotta (born 22 March 1971) is an Italian Australian soccer coach and former player. As a forward, she represented Australia women's national association football team in the 1995 and 1999 FIFA Women's World Cups and played club football in Australia, Italy and Japan. Iannotta's equaliser against China in 1995 was Australia's first ever World Cup goal.

Iannotta played alongside Italy's Carolina Morace in Agliana's 1994–95 Scudetto winning team. In 1996–97 Iannotta joined Cheryl Salisbury and Sunni Hughes at Panasonic Bambina of Japan's L. League. Two broken legs, sustained seven months apart, derailed Iannotta's progress in Japan and she returned to Italy. In 1998 she accepted a place on the Australian Institute of Sport Football Program, ahead of the following year's World Cup in the United States.

In July 2023, the Australian Broadcasting Corporation's digital sports journalist Samantha Lewis complained that footage of Australia's first Women's World Cup goal, scored by Iannotta, is not freely available but is "buried on a database at FIFA headquarters" which would cost "an unfathomable amount of money" to officially license. Lewis stated: "In this day of social media and live-streaming and the endless churn of sports content, it's hard to imagine that a goal as iconic as this would simply fade away, placed in a figurative box on a figurative shelf and left to gather dust."
