= Pirom Un-prasert =

Thai football referee

Pirom Un-Prasert
- Born: 16 November 1953 (age 72); Thailand

International
Years	League	Role
1998	1998 FIFA World Cup	referee

Pirom Un-Prasert (Thai: ภิรมย์ อั๋นประเสริฐ) (born 16 November 1953) is a retired international football referee from Thailand. He is best known for refereeing the 1997 FIFA Confederations Cup Final and two matches in the 1998 FIFA World Cup in France; the Norway-Morocco and Paraguay-Nigeria matches in the first round. He also officiated at the 1995 FIFA Women's World Cup, the 1996 Olympic tournament in Atlanta, the 1996 AFC Asian Cup, and eight matches in 1998 World Cup qualifiers.
