= Anne Dot Eggers Nielsen =

Danish footballer and journalist (born 1975)

Anne Dot Eggers Helleskov
Personal information
- Birth name: Anne Nielsen
- Date of birth: 6 November 1975 (age 50)
- Place of birth: Horsens, Denmark
- Position: Midfielder

Youth career
- 1990–1992: Horsens FC

Senior career*
Years	Team	Apps	(Gls)
1993–	Vejle B		
1994–2000	HEI Aarhus		
2001	New York Power	12	(0)
2002–2004	IK Skovbakken		
2004–2007	Brøndby		
Total		145	(38)

International career
1993–2007	Denmark	118	(26)

Managerial career
- 2013–2014: IK Skovbakken (assistant)
- 2014–: IF Lyseng U-17 (assistant)
- * Club domestic league appearances and goals

Anne Dot Eggers Helleskov (born Anne Nielsen; 6 November 1975) is a Danish journalist, football coach, and former player who played as a midfielder.

Eggers started playing at 15 for Horsens FC and was with the club for two years, before signing with Vejle B for the 1993 season. She moved to HEI Aarhus in 1994 and played there until 2000, where she signed with New York Power in 2001, the first Danish player to play in the NWSL. Eggers returned to her former club, now merged with the club of the same name to form IK Skovbakken, in 2002, where she played for two years. In 2004, she signed with Brøndby and would conclude her playing career with the club in 2007. Eggers won multiple league titles with HEI Aarhus and was awarded Danish Player of the Year in 2003.

She played for the Danish national team from 1993 to 2007, albeit with a break between 1999 and 2002. Eggers officially announced her retirement from football in January 2008. She won 118 caps and scored 26 goals for the Danish national team.

Following her football career, Eggers became a journalist and in 2011 contributed to a biography of her former teammate, Katrine Pedersen. She also acquired a coaching license and worked as an assistant coach at IK Skovbakken and IF Lyseng in the 2010s.

== International career ==
At the 2007 FIFA Women's World Cup the Danish team accused the Chinese hosts of harassment and covert surveillance prior to China's first round match against Denmark. When FIFA refused to investigate, Eggers Nielsen wrote an article about allegations of corrupt practices within FIFA.
