= Australia women's national soccer team results (1975–1999) =

The Australia women's national soccer team results for the period 1975 to 1999 inclusive.

== Match results ==
Win Draw Loss

=== 1975–1979 ===
An Australian representative side participated in the 1975 AFC Women's Championship. Initially, these games were not recognised as official Australian international fixtures. The participants were a NSW State Team (St George Budapest) that the organisers had labelled as Australia. Further to this, matches were only 60 minutes in length. The team was officially recognised in May 2023, with all 16 members of the squad officially awarded caps.

25 August 1975 1975 AFC Championship GS	Thailand	3–2	Australia	Hong Kong
	Boabutr 20'; Chaisawat 29'; Thongsa 52'		O'Connor 58'; Abenthum 60' (pen.)	Stadium: Government Stadium

29 August 1975 1975 AFC Championship GS	Australia	3–0	Singapore	Hong Kong
	Barry 19'; Dolan 52'; O'Connor 60'			Stadium: Government Stadium; Attendance: 2,226

31 August 1975 1975 AFC Championship SF	New Zealand	3–2	Australia	Hong Kong
	Marshall 17'; Richardson 26', 50'		Trixie Barry 48'; Dolan 59'	Stadium: Government Stadium; Attendance: 6,655

2 September 1975 1975 AFC Championship 3rd	Australia	5–0	Malaysia	Hong Kong
				Stadium: Government Stadium; Attendance: 11,573

6 October 1979 Trans-Tasman Cup	Australia	2–2	New Zealand	Sydney, Australia
	Brentnall; Mateljan	Report	Marshall; Hetherington	Stadium: Seymour Shaw Park

8 October 1979 Trans-Tasman Cup	Australia	0–1	New Zealand	Sydney, Australia
		Report	Ah Wong	Stadium: Seymour Shaw Park

13 October 1979 Trans-Tasman Cup	Australia	1–0	New Zealand	Brisbane, Australia
	Lovelace (?)	Report		Stadium: Perry Park

=== 1980–1984 ===
18 May 1980 Rose Bowl Series	New Zealand	3–3	Australia	Auckland, New Zealand
	Leonidas (?); Jacobsen (?); Marshall (?)	Report	Heydon (?); Brentnall (?); Te Huia (o.g.)	Stadium: University Park; Referee: Bill Munro

21 May 1980 Rose Bowl Series	New Zealand	1–1	Australia	Wellington, New Zealand
	Sharpe (?)	Report	Brentnall 23'	Stadium: Newtown Park; Referee: Tom Delahunty

24 May 1980 Rose Bowl Series	New Zealand	2–3	Australia	Christchurch, NZ
	Jacobsen (?); Grant (?)	Report	Sandra Brentnall 9' 20' 51'	Stadium: Queen Elizabeth Park; Referee: Neil Burt

1s October 1981 NZ Provincial Tour 'B' International	Canterbury NZ	0–2	Australia	Christchurch, NZ
		Report	Porter, Wright

2nd October 1981 NZ Provincial Tour 'B' International	Otago NZ	0–6	Australia	Dunedin, New Zealand
		Report	Dolan, Porter, Singleton, Monteath, Wass 2

3rd October 1981 NZ Provincial Tour 'B' International	Waikato NZ	0–1	Australia	Hamilton, New Zealand
		Report	Brentnall	Stadium: 'B' International

5 October 1981 Trans-Tasman Cup	New Zealand	1–2	Australia	Auckland, New Zealand
	Fulham	Report	Porter, Brentnall	Stadium: Gallaher Park

9th March 1983 Wahine Tournament match 'B' International	He Pua Pani USA	1–0	Australia	Honolulu, United States
	Goalscorer Not Known	Report

28 November 1983 OFC Oceania Cup	New Zealand	0–0	Australia	Nouméa, New Caledonia

30 November 1983 OFC Oceania Cup	New Caledonia	0–5	Australia	Nouméa, New Caledonia
			Heydon (?); Dolan} (?); Porter (?); Wardell (?)

2 December 1983 OFC Oceania Cup	Fiji	0–13	Australia	Nouméa, New Caledonia
			Monteath (?); Millman (?); Wardell (?); Iserief (?); Heydon (?)

4 December 1983 OFC Oceania Cup	New Zealand	3 – 2 (a.e.t.)	Australia	Nouméa, New Caledonia
	Jacobsen (?); Sharpe (?); Own goal (?)		Brentnall (?); Dolan (?)

5 October 1984 Xi'an International Tournament	Japan	2–6	Australia	Xi'an, China

12 December 1984 Women's World Invitational	New Zealand	3–0	Australia	Taipei, Taiwan

16 December 1984 Women's World Invitational	Chinese Taipei	2–0	Australia	Taipei, Taiwan

=== 1985–1989 ===
29 March 1986 OFC Women's Championship	New Zealand	0–1	Australia	Christchurch, New Zealand
		Report	Iserief (?)

31 March 1986 OFC Women's Championship	Chinese Taipei	1–0	Australia	Christchurch, New Zealand
	Tai-Ying (HT+15)	Report

4 April 1986 OFC Women's Championship	Chinese Taipei	4–1	Australia	Christchurch, New Zealand
		Report

12 December 1987 Women's World Invitational Tournament	Australia	2–0	Canada	Kaohsiung, Taiwan
		Report

13 December 1987 Women's World Invitational Tournament	Australia	6–0	Hong Kong	Kaohsiung, Taiwan
		Report

15 December 1987 Women's World Invitational Tournament	Chinese Taipei	2–0	Australia	Taipei, Taiwan
		Report

16 December 1987 Women's World Invitational Tournament	United States	6–0	Australia	Taipei, Taiwan
		Report

17 December 1987 Women's World Invitational Tournament	Canada	0–0	Australia	Taipei, Taiwan
		Report

19 December 1987 Women's World Invitational Tournament	New Zealand	1–0	Australia	Taipei, Taiwan
		Report

1 June 1988 1988 FIFA Women's Invitation Tournament	Australia	1–0	Brazil	Jiangmen, China
		Report

3 June 1988 1988 FIFA Women's Invitation Tournament	Australia	3–0	Thailand	Jiangmen, China
		Report

5 June 1988 1988 FIFA Women's Invitation Tournament	Norway	3–0	Australia	Jiangmen, China
		Report

8 June 1988 1988 FIFA Women's Invitation Tournament	China	7–0	Australia	Guangzhou, China
		Report

26 March 1989 1989 OFC Women's Championship	Australia	0–2	New Zealand	Brisbane, Australia
				Stadium: Perry Park

28 March 1989 1989 OFC Women's Championship	Australia	6–0	Papua New Guinea	Brisbane, Australia
				Stadium: Perry Park

31 March 1989 1989 OFC Women's Championship	Australia	1–4	Chinese Taipei	Brisbane, Australia
				Stadium: Perry Park

4 December 1989 Prima Cup	Japan	2–2	Australia	Kanagawa, Japan

5 December 1989 Prima Cup	Japan	1–1	Australia	Kanagawa, Japan

=== 1991 ===
20 May 1991 OFC Women's Championship	Australia	0–1	New Zealand	Sydney, Australia
		Report	van de Elzen	Stadium: Marconi Stadium, Bossley Park

21 May 1991 OFC Women's Championship	Australia	12–0	Papua New Guinea	Sydney, Australia
	Hughes; Iannotta; Wass; Gegenhuber (?); Tann (?); Bartlett (?); ? (?)	Report		Stadium: Marconi Stadium, Bossley Park

24 May 1991 OFC Women's Championship	Australia	1–0	New Zealand	Sydney, Australia

25 May 1991 OFC Women's Championship	Australia	8–0	Papua New Guinea	Sydney, Australia

20 October 1991 Friendly	New Zealand	0–0	Australia	Christchurch, New Zealand

23 October 1991 Friendly	New Zealand	3–0	Australia	Wellington, New Zealand

26 October 1991 Friendly	New Zealand	2–0	Australia	Hamilton, New Zealand

=== 1994 ===
20 April 1994 Gold Coast Invitational	Australia	1–2	Russia	Brisbane, Australia

23 April 1994 Gold Coast Invitational	Australia	1–1	Russia	Southport, Australia

12 August 1994 Friendly	Russia	0–3	Australia	Samara, Russia

27 September 1994 Friendly	Japan	2–2	Australia	Tokyo, Japan

14 October 1994 OFC Women's Championship	New Zealand	2–1	Australia	Port Moresby, Papua New Guinea
	Sharpe (?)	Report	Forman (?)

16 October 1994 OFC Women's Championship	Papua New Guinea	0–7	Australia	Port Moresby, Papua New Guinea
			Pumpa (?); Salisbury (?); Casagrande (?); Hughes (?); Forman (?)

18 October 1994 OFC Women's Championship	Australia	1–0	New Zealand	Port Moresby, Papua New Guinea
	Murray (?)	Report

19 October 1994 OFC Women's Championship	Papua New Guinea	0–4	Australia	Port Moresby, Papua New Guinea
			Salisbury (?); Casagrande (?); Hughes (?) ? (?)

=== 1995 ===
20 January 1995 Friendly	United States	5–0	Australia	Phoenix, United States

23 January 1995 Friendly	United States	4–1	Australia	Phoenix, United States

17 March 1995 Friendly	Australia	4–0	New Zealand	Canberra, Australia

19 March 1995 Friendly	Australia	2–0	New Zealand	Canberra, Australia

10 April 1995 Havelange Trophy	Australia	7–0	Argentina	Uberlandia, Brazil

14 April 1995 Havelange Trophy	Brazil	3–0	Australia	Uberlandia, Brazil

16 April 1995 Havelange Trophy	Brazil	2–3	Australia	Uberlandia, Brazil

11 May 1995 Friendly	Canada	3–0	Australia	Vancouver, Canada

13 May 1995 Friendly	Canada	0–3	Australia	Vancouver, Canada

18 May 1995 Friendly	Scotland	0–0	Australia	Kilmarnock, Scotland

27 May 1995 Friendly	Sweden	5–0	Australia	Helsingborg, Sweden

6 June 1995 World Cup	Denmark	5–0	Australia	Västerås, Sweden
19:00	Krogh 12', 48'; Nielsen 25'; Jensen 37'; Hansen 86'	(Report)	Gegenhuber (red card) 30'	Stadium: Arosvallen; Attendance: 1,500; Referee: Bente Skovgang (Norway)

8 June 1995 World Cup	China	4–2	Australia	Västerås, Sweden
19:00	Zhou 23'; Shi 54', 78'; Liu 90+3'	(Report)	Iannotta 25'; Hughes 89'	Stadium: Arosvallen; Attendance: 1,500; Referee: Maria Edilene Sequeira (Brazil)

10 June 1995 World Cup	United States	4–1	Australia	Helsingborg, Sweden
19:00	Foudy 69'; Fawcett 72'; Overbeck 90+2' (pen.); Keller 90+4'	(Report)	Casagrande 54'	Stadium: Olympia; Attendance: 1,150; Referee: Pirom Un-Prasert (Thailand)

29 July 1995 1995 Women's U.S. Cup	Norway	2–0	Australia	Worcester, United States

3 August 1995 1995 Women's U.S. Cup	United States	4–2	Australia	New Brunswick, United States

5 August 1995 1995 Women's U.S. Cup	Chinese Taipei	2–3	Australia	Richmond, United States

=== 1996 ===
24 March 1996 Tri-nation Series	New Zealand	0–3	Australia	Auckland, New Zealand

25 March 1996 Tri-nation Series	Australia	1–0	South Korea	Auckland, New Zealand

29 March 1996 Tri-nation Series	Australia	1–2	South Korea	Auckland, New Zealand

30 March 1996 Tri-nation Series	New Zealand	0–2	Australia	Auckland, New Zealand

4 July 1996 Friendly	United States	2–1	Australia	Tampa, United States
	Julie Foudy 18'; Cindy Parlow 81'	Report	Black 5'	Stadium: Tampa Stadium

6 July 1996 Friendly	United States	2–1	Australia	Pensacola, United States

9 July 1996 Friendly	Japan	2–2	Australia	Fort Lauderdale, United States

11 July 1996 Friendly	China	1–0	Australia	Bradenton, United States

14 July 1996 Friendly	China	2–1	Australia	Bradenton, United States

=== 1997 ===
28 February 1997 Ram Sports Cup	Australia	0–4	United States	Melbourne, Australia
		Report	Parlow 12'; Venturini 40'; Fotopoulos 73'; Hamm 75'	Attendance: 1,500

2 March 1997 Ram Sports Cup	Australia	1–3	United States	Bathurst, Australia
		Report	Baumgardt 53'; Lilly 67'; Chastain (?)	Attendance: 3,228

5 March 1997 Ram Sports Cup	Australia	0–3	United States	Canberra, Australia
		Report	Chastain 10'; Foudy 53'; Milbrett 90'	Attendance: 4,031

31 May 1997 U.S. Cup	Italy	3–0	Australia	Salem, United States
	Panico 33'; Carta 45', 75'

5 June 1997 U.S. Cup	United States	9–1	Australia	Ambler, United States
	Milbrett 5'; Parlow 16', 42'; Hamm 19', 32'; Pearce 37'; Lilly 48'; Venturini 56'; Keller 81'		Taylor 75'

7 June 1997 U.S. Cup	Australia	3–2	Canada	Oakford, United States
	Hughes 21', 55'; Casagrande 100'		O'Neill (?); Burtini 82'

6 August 1997 Friendly	Sweden	0–1	Australia	Östersund, Sweden
		Report	Murray (?)

10 August 1997 Friendly	Hungary	0–4	Australia	Csákvár, Hungary
		Report	Duus 10'; Moore 31'; Black 60', 84'	Attendance: 1,322

15 August 1997 Friendly	Netherlands	1–1	Australia	Grootebroek, Netherlands
	Griffioen (?)	Report	Casagrande (?)

20 August 1997 Friendly	Belgium	1–0	Australia	Brussels, Belgium
		Report

24 August 1997 Friendly	Estonia	1–5	Australia	Haapsalu, Estonia
		Report	Salisbury (?); Murray (?); Taylor (?); Revell (?)

27 August 1997 Friendly	Finland	2–0	Australia	Helsinki, Finland
	Kalmari 69'; Uusmalmi 89'	Report

1 September 1997 Friendly	Norway	7–1	Australia	Oslo, Norway
		Report	Murray 71'

16 November 1997 Tri Nations Series	Australia	0–3	China	Lismore, Australia
		Report

19 November 1997 Tri Nations Series	Australia	2–0	New Zealand	Newcastle, Australia
	Revell (?); Salisbury (?)	Report

23 November 1997 Tri Nations Series	Australia	2–1	China	Canberra, Australia
	Cooper (?); Hughes (?)	Report

=== 1998 ===
29 August 1998 Friendly	North Korea	0–0	Australia	Pyongyang, North Korea
		Report		Stadium: National Stadium; Attendance: 58,000

1 September 1998 Friendly	North Korea	0–0	Australia	Pyongyang, North Korea
		Report		Stadium: National Stadium; Attendance: 15,000

3 September 1998 Friendly	North Korea	0–1	Australia	Pyongyang, North Korea
		Report	Murray 72'	Stadium: National Stadium; Attendance: 22,000

9 October 1998 OFC Championship and World Cup qualifier	Australia	21–0	American Samoa	Auckland, New Zealand
	Natalie Thomas 4', 35', 55'; Lisa Casagrande 19', 59'; Tann-Darby 28'; Salisbury 29', 58', 72', 81', 90+3'; Black 37', 68', 88', 90+5'; Ferguson 44', 79'; Taylor 50'; Forman 66'; Peters 78'; Boyd 90+6'	Report		Stadium: Mount Smart Stadium

11 October 1998 OFC Championship and World Cup qualifier	Australia	8–0	Papua New Guinea	Auckland, New Zealand
	Black 33', 40', 55'; Lisa Casagrande 28'; Salisbury 66', 67', 86'; Boyd 90+2'	Report		Stadium: Mount Smart Stadium

15 October 1998 OFC Championship and World Cup qualifier	Australia	17–0	Fiji	Auckland, New Zealand
	Murray 3', 23', 47'; Iannotta 7', 43'; Boyd 23', 39'; Black 33', 40', 55'; Peters 49', 53', 58', 81'; Ferguson 69', 72'; Salisbury 83'	Report		Stadium: Mount Smart Stadium

17 October 1998 OFC Championship Final and World Cup qualifier	New Zealand	1–3	Australia	Auckland, New Zealand
	Smith 77'	Report	Murray 2'; Starr 13'; Lisa Casagrande 66'	Stadium: Mount Smart Stadium

=== 1999 ===
8 January 1999 Australia Cup	Australia	1–1 (a.e.t.) (3–4 p)	Italy	Sydney, Australia
	Salisbury 85'	Report	Panico 60'	Stadium: Marconi Stadium; Attendance: 2,197; Referee: Tammy Ogston
	Penalties
	Forman (penalty scored); Murray (penalty scored); Salisbury (penalty scored)		Florinda Ciardi (penalty scored); Luisa Marchio (penalty scored); Adele Frollani (penalty scored); Roberta Stefanelli (penalty scored)

10 January 1999 Australia Cup	Australia	4–3	Canada	Canberra, Australia
	Murray 54'; Iannotta 17'; Lisa Casagrande 61'; Tann-Darby 89'	Report	Donnelly 30'; Hooper 60', 69'	Stadium: Bruce Stadium; Attendance: 3,851; Referee: Tammy Ogston

13 January 1999 Australia Cup	Australia	1–0	Italy	Canberra, Australia
	Salisbury 19'	Report		Stadium: Bruce Stadium; Attendance: 2,979; Referee: Tammy Ogston

14 March 1999 Algarve Cup	Denmark	1–1	Australia	Faro, Portugal
	Hansen 19'	Report	Murray 77'	Stadium: Estadio St Luis

16 March 1999 Algarve Cup	Portugal	0–0	Australia	Olhão, Portugal
		Report

18 March 1999 Algarve Cup	Australia	0–2	China	Albufeira, Portugal
		Report	Sun Wen 77'; Liu Ying 77'

20 March 1999 Algarve Cup	Australia	1–1 (a.e.t.) (7–6 p)	Sweden	Loulé, Portugal
	Murray 71'	Report	Gustafsson 45'
	Penalties
	Murray (penalty scored); Peters (penalty scored); Tann-Darby (penalty missed); Ferguson (penalty scored); Salisbury (penalty scored); Black (penalty scored); Revell (penalty scored); Bartlett (penalty scored)		Penalty scored Penalty missed

3 June 1999 Friendly	United States	4–0	Australia	Portland, United States
	Fotopoulos 1'; Parlow 68'; Lilly 71'; Milbrett 85'	Report		Stadium: Nike Training Centre; Referee: Mohammad Zarrabi-Kashani (United States)

6 June 1999 Friendly	Brazil	3–1	Australia	Portland, United States
	Pretinha 26', 70'; Nenê 49'	Report	Murray 32'	Stadium: Civic Stadium; Attendance: 23,325; Referee: Kari Seita (United States)

9 June 1999 Friendly	Canada	1–3	Australia	Toronto, Canada
	Harvey 24'	Report	Ferguson 9'; Black 45', 57'	Stadium: Centennial Park Stadium

12 June 1999 Friendly	Canada	2–0	Australia	Toronto, Canada
	Hooper 46'; Neil 55'	Report

20 June 1999 World Cup	Australia	1–1	Ghana	Foxborough, United States
	Murray 74'	Report	Gyamfua 76'	Stadium: Foxboro Stadium; Attendance: 14,867; Referee: Kari Seitz (United States)

23 June 1999 World Cup	Australia	1–3	Sweden	Landover, United States
	Murray 32'	Report	Törnqvist 8'; Ljungberg 21', 69'	Stadium: Jack Kent Cooke Stadium; Attendance: 16,448; Referee: Fatou Gaye (Senegal)

26 June 1999 World Cup	China	3–1	Australia	East Rutherford, United States
	Sun Wen 39', 51'; Liu Ying 73'	Report	Salisbury 66'	Stadium: Giants Stadium; Attendance: 29,401; Referee: Sandra Hunt (United States)

28 October 1999 Friendly	China	3–1	Australia	Zhuhai, China
	Wang Li Ping 35'; Xie Hui Lin 37'; Zhao Li Hong 77'	Report	Hughes 61'	Stadium: Zhuhai Stadium; Attendance: 15,000

31 October 1999 Friendly	China	4–2	Australia	Xiamen, China
	Liu Ying 15', 58'; Zhang Ouying 41'; Qiu Haiyan 61'	Report	Hughes 7'; Salisbury 80'	Attendance: 15,000

== See also ==
- Australia women's national soccer team results (2000–2009)
- Australia women's national soccer team results (2010–2019)
- Australia women's national soccer team results (2020–present)
