= 1997 Women's U.S. Cup =

Tournament details
- Host country: United States
- Dates: May 31 – June 8, 1997
- Teams: 4 (from 3 confederations)

The third Women's U.S. Cup tournament held in 1997, were joined by four teams: Australia, Canada, Italy and USA.

== Standings ==
Pos	Team	Pld	W	D	L	GF	GA	GD	Pts
1	United States (C, H)	3	3	0	0	15	1	+14	9
2	Italy	3	2	0	1	5	3	+2	6
3	Australia	3	1	0	2	4	14	−10	3
4	Canada	3	0	0	3	3	9	−6	0

Source: RSSSF
(C) Champions; (H) Hosts

== Matches ==
May 31 Round-robin	United States	4–0	Canada	New Britain, Connecticut
	Milbrett 40'; Hamm 58', 65', 74'			Stadium: Veterans Stadium

May 31 Round-robin	Italy	3–0	Australia	Salem, New Hampshire
	Panico 33'; Carta 45', 75'

June 4 Round-robin	Italy	2–1	Canada	Worcester, Massachusetts
	Carta 47'; Morace 52'		Morneau 8'

June 5 Round-robin	United States	9–1	Australia	Ambler, Pennsylvania
	Milbrett 5'; Parlow 16', 42'; Hamm 19', 32'; Pearce 37'; Lilly 48'; Venturini 56'; Keller 81'		Taylor 75'

June 7 Round-robin	Australia	3–2	Canada	Oakford, Pennsylvania
	Hughes 21', 55'; Casagrande 100'		O'Neill ?'; Burtini 82'

June 8 Round-robin	United States	2–0	Italy	Washington, D.C.
	Parlow 68'; Hamm 90'
