= Mia Hamm Foundation =

American nonprofit organization

- Founded: 1999
- Founder: Mia Hamm
- Type: Nonprofit
- Location: Chapel Hill, North Carolina
- Region served: United States
- Website: www.miafoundation.org

The Mia Hamm Foundation is an American nonprofit organization that seeks to promote awareness and raise funds for families in need of a bone marrow or cord blood transplant. It is also dedicated to the development of more opportunities for young women to participate in sports. The organization is headquartered in Chapel Hill, North Carolina.

== History ==
The Mia Hamm Foundation was founded in 1999 following the death of Hamm's brother Garrett in 1997 from complications of aplastic anemia, a rare blood disease. In 1998, Hamm organized the first annual fundraising event, the Garrett Game, in honor of her brother. At the first event, players from the U.S. women's national soccer team played against top college players. Funds generated at the annual event are donated to bone marrow research organizations. In 2007, the Foundation began hosting an annual All-Celebrity Soccer Challenge that brings many notable professional athletes and celebrities together to play in a 7-on-7 exhibition game. Previous participants have included: Kobe Bryant, Alex Morgan, Abby Wambach, Julie Foudy, and Nomar Garciaparra.
