= 2001 Women's U.S. Cup =

Tournament details
- Host country: United States
- Dates: September 7–9, 2001 (abandoned)
- Teams: 4 (from 3 confederations)

The 2001 Women's U.S. Cup was a women's soccer tournament held in the United States between four national teams. It was the seventh edition of the U.S. Cup and featured China, Germany, Japan, and hosts United States. The tournament was abandoned due to the September 11 attacks; three of the six matches had been played.

== Matches ==
| September 7 Round-robin | Germany | 1–0 | Japan | Buffalo Grove, Illinois |
| 5:30pm CT | Hagedorn 78' | | | Stadium: Schwaben Field |

| September 9 Round-robin | United States | 4–1 | Germany | Chicago |
| 12:00pm CT | Parlow 19'; Milbrett 51'; Hamm 72', 73' | | Müller 23' | Stadium: Soldier Field; Attendance: 10,235 |

| September 9 Round-robin | China | 3–0 | Japan | Chicago |
| 2:30pm CT | Bai Jie 39'; Bai Lili 45', 53' | | | Stadium: Soldier Field |

| September 11 Round-robin | Germany | cancelled | China | Columbus, Ohio |
| | | | | Stadium: Crew Stadium |

| September 11 Round-robin | United States | cancelled | Japan | Columbus, Ohio |
| | | | | Stadium: Crew Stadium |

| September 16 Round-robin | United States | cancelled | China | Kansas City, Kansas |
| | | | | Stadium: Arrowhead Stadium |

== Placing ==
Placing at the time the tournament was abandoned.

| Rank | Team | Matches | | | | Goals | | Points |
| Rank | Team | Played | Win | Draw | Loss | Scored | Against | Points |
|---|---|---|---|---|---|---|---|---|
| 1 | United States | 1 | 1 | 0 | 0 | 4 | 1 | 3 |
| 2 | China | 1 | 1 | 0 | 0 | 3 | 0 | 3 |
| 3 | Germany | 2 | 1 | 0 | 1 | 2 | 4 | 3 |
| 4 | Japan | 2 | 0 | 0 | 2 | 1 | 7 | 0 |
