= Tammy Pearman =

American soccer player (born 1973)

Personal information
- Full name: Tamara Melinda Pearman
- Date of birth: December 15, 1973 (age 52)
- Place of birth: Brooklyn, New York, U.S.
- Height: 5 ft 7 in (1.70 m)
- Position: Defender

Youth career
- –1991: La Cueva Bears

College career
Years	Team	Apps	(Gls)
1991–1994	George Mason Patriots	?	(41)

Senior career*
Years	Team	Apps	(Gls)
- OKI FC Winds
- Maryland Pride
2001–2003	New York Power	56	(8)
2015	Fairfax Herricanes		
2016	Swanson City FC		

International career
1995–1997	United States	9	(1)

Managerial career
- 2004–2009: Georgetown Hoyas (assistant)
- * Club domestic league appearances and goals

Tamara Melinda Pearman (born December 15, 1973) is an American former soccer player who played as a defender, making nine appearances for the United States women's national team.

== Career ==
Pearman played for the La Cueva Bears in high school, and also participated in track and field. In college, she played for the George Mason Patriots from 1991 to 1994. She helped the team reach the final of the 1993 NCAA Division I Women's Soccer Tournament (where they lost to North Carolina), becoming the first black female player to appear in the championship game of the NCAA tournament. She was an NSCAA Second-Team All-American in 1994, and All-Region player in 1993 to 1994. She was included on the NCAA All-Tournament Team in 1993, as well as the All-CAA selection in 1993 (second team) and 1994 (first team). Pearman received the CAA Commissioner's Academic Award in 1993, and was the CAA Player of the Year in 1994. In total, she scored 41 goals and recorded 13 assists for the Patriots, with her tally of career goals ranked fourth in school history.

Pearman made her international debut for the United States on August 6, 1995, in the 1995 Women's U.S. Cup against Norway, with her scoring the winning golden goal. In total, she made nine appearances for the U.S. and scored the one goal, earning her final cap on May 11, 1997, in a friendly match against England.

In club soccer, Pearman played professionally with OKI FC Winds for four years in Japan after finishing at George Mason. She later played for the Maryland Pride, before being selected by the New York Power in the 2000 WUSA Draft. She played for the Power from 2001 to 2003, scoring 8 goals and recording 4 assists in 56 regular season appearances, along with playing in one postseason game. She later played adult soccer for the Fairfax Herricanes in 2015 and Swanson City FC in 2016, managing the former.

She later worked as an assistant coach for the Georgetown Hoyas women's soccer team from 2004 to 2009. Pearman was included in the CAA Silver Anniversary Women's Soccer Team. She was inducted into the La Cueva High School Athletic Hall of Fame in 2016.

== Personal life ==
Pearman was born in Brooklyn, though she grew up in Albuquerque, New Mexico. She lives in Northern Virginia, and has one daughter.

== Career statistics ==
=== International ===
United States
Year	Apps	Goals
1995	1	1
1996	3	0
1997	5	0
Total	9	1

=== International goals ===
No.	Date	Location	Opponent	Score	Result	Competition
1	August 6, 1995	Washington, D.C., United States	Norway	2–1	2–1	1995 Women's U.S. Cup
