= U.S. Cup =

American annual soccer competition

U.S. Cup Men's Tournament
- Organizer(s): USSF
- Founded: 1992
- Abolished: 2000
- Teams: 4
- Most championships: United States; Mexico (3 titles each)

The U.S. Cup (also known as the USA Cup, United States Cup and the Nike U.S. Cup) was a soccer competition held annually in the United States from 1992 to 2000, except for the World Cup years of 1994 and 1998. The tournament, hosted by the United States Soccer Federation, was contested between the United States and three guest teams.

U.S. Cup Women's Tournament
- Organizer(s): USSF
- Founded: 1995
- Abolished: 2002
- Teams: 4
- Related competitions: SheBelieves Cup
- Most championships: United States (7 titles)

The cup was created to train the American soccer team and to popularize the sport in the US before the men's 1994 FIFA World Cup. Originally known as the U.S. Cup, the name was changed to the Nike U.S. Cup after Nike, Inc. signed a ten-year, $120 million contract with the United States Soccer Federation to sponsor the U.S. national teams in October 1997. As part of the contract, USSF added Nike's name to the U.S. Cup title.

In 1995, USSF added a women's competition which ran every year until 2002. The 2001 edition was abandoned after three matches due to the September 11 attacks.

== Format ==
The cup was traditionally played in a single round-robin format between the four participating national teams.

The 1999 edition of the men's and 2000 edition of the women's tournaments, were played in single elimination format. The first round was the semifinals. The losers of the semifinals played for third place, and the winners of the semifinals played the Final match.

== List of champions ==
=== Men's tournament ===
| Year | Champion | Runner-up | Third place | Fourth place |
|---|---|---|---|---|
| 1992 details | United States | Italy | Republic of Ireland | Portugal |
| 1993 details | Germany | Brazil | United States | England |
| 1995 details | United States | Colombia | Mexico | Nigeria |
| 1996 details | Mexico | Republic of Ireland | United States | Bolivia |
| 1997 details | Mexico | Denmark | Peru | United States |
| 1999 details | Mexico | United States | Guatemala | Bolivia |
| 2000 details | United States | Republic of Ireland | Mexico | South Africa |

=== Women's tournament ===
| Year | Champion | Runner-up | Third place | Fourth place |
|---|---|---|---|---|
| 1995 details | United States | Norway | Australia | Chinese Taipei |
| 1996 details | United States | China | Japan | Canada |
| 1997 details | United States | Italy | Australia | Canada |
| 1998 details | United States | Brazil | Russia | Mexico |
| 1999 details | United States | Brazil | Finland | South Korea |
| 2000 details | United States | Canada | Mexico | South Korea |
| 2001 details | Tournament abandoned |
| 2002 details | United States | Australia | Italy | Russia |

== Titles by country ==
=== Men's tournament ===
- United States 3 times (1992, 1995, 2000)
- Mexico 3 times (1996, 1997, 1999)
- Germany 1 time (1993)

=== Women's tournament ===
- United States 7 times (all, except for the abandoned 2001 edition)

== National team appearances ==
=== Men’s ===
| Rank | Team | Appearance |
|---|---|---|
| 1 | United States (hosts) | 7 |
| 2 | Mexico | 5 |
| 3 | Republic of Ireland | 3 |
| 4 | Bolivia | 2 |
| 5 | Brazil | 1 |
| 5 | Colombia | 1 |
| 5 | Denmark | 1 |
| 5 | England | 1 |
| 5 | Germany | 1 |
| 5 | Guatemala | 1 |
| 5 | Italy | 1 |
| 5 | Nigeria | 1 |
| 5 | Peru | 1 |
| 5 | Portugal | 1 |
| 5 | South Africa | 1 |

=== Women’s ===
Number of appearance excludes the abandoned 2001 edition.

| Rank | Team | Appearance |
|---|---|---|
| 1 | United States (hosts) | 7 |
| 2 | Australia | 3 |
| 2 | Canada | 3 |
| 3 | Brazil | 2 |
| 3 | Italy | 2 |
| 3 | South Korea | 2 |
| 3 | Mexico | 2 |
| 3 | Russia | 2 |
| 4 | China | 1 |
| 4 | Finland | 1 |
| 4 | Japan | 1 |
| 4 | Norway | 1 |
| 4 | Chinese Taipei | 1 |

== Venues ==
- Frontier Field, Rochester, NY 1998 (2 games)
- RFK Stadium, Washington, DC-1992, 1993 (2 games), 1995 (2 games), 1996, 2000
- Foxboro Stadium, Foxborough, MA-1992 (2 games), 1993, 1995, 1996, 2000
- Rose Bowl, Pasadena, CA-1996, 1997 (4 games)
- Soldier Field, Chicago, IL-1992 (2 games), 1993, 2000
- Giants Stadium, East Rutherford, NJ-1996 (2 games), 2000 (2 games)
- Qualcomm Stadium, San Diego, CA-1997 (2 games), 1999 (2 games)
- Yale Bowl, New Haven, CT-1992, 1993
- Rutgers Stadium, Piscataway, NJ-1995 (2 games)
- Cotton Bowl, Dallas, TX-1996, 2000
- Los Angeles Memorial Coliseum, Los Angeles, CA-1999 (2 games)
- Pontiac Silverdome, Pontiac, MI-1993
