= Australia women's national soccer team results (2020–present) =

The Australia women's national soccer team results for the period 2020 to 2029.

== Match results ==
Win Draw Loss Cancelled

=== 2020 ===
| 7 February Olympic Qualifying Tournament Third round | Australia | 7–0 | Chinese Taipei | Sydney, Australia |
| 19:30 AEDT | Foord 10', 24', 38'; Catley 31'; Raso 54'; Kerr 64'; Gorry 90+2' | Report | | Stadium: Campbelltown Stadium; Referee: Oh Hyeon-jeong (South Korea) |

| 10 February Olympic Qualifying Tournament Third round | Australia | 6–0 | Thailand | Sydney, Australia |
| 19:30 AEDT | van Egmond 44', 45+4', 70'; Simon 67', 73'; Raso 71' | Report | | Stadium: Campbelltown Stadium; Referee: Yoshimi Yamashita (Japan) |

| 13 February Olympic Qualifying Tournament Third round | Australia | 1–1 | China | Sydney, Australia |
| 19:30 AEDT | Van Egmond 90+2' | Report | Tang Jiali 86' | Stadium: Bankwest Stadium; Attendance: 5,660; Referee: Yoshimi Yamashita (Japan) |

| 6 March Olympic Qualifying Tournament Play-off round | Australia | 5–0 | Vietnam | Newcastle, Australia |
| 18:30 AEDT | Kerr 10', 80' (pen.); Logarzo 27'; Van Egmond 38'; Polkinghorne 67' | Report | | Stadium: McDonald Jones Stadium; Attendance: 14,014; Referee: Abirami Naidu (Singapore) |

| 11 March Olympic Qualifying Tournament Play-off round | Vietnam | 1–2 | Australia | Cẩm Phả, Vietnam |
| 18:00 ICT | Huỳnh Như 55' | Report | Kerr 15'; Raso 27' | Stadium: Cẩm Phả Stadium; Referee: Thein Thein Aye (Myanmar) |

| 10 April Friendly | United States | Cancelled | Australia | Sandy, United States |
| 21:30 ET | | Cancellation | | Stadium: Rio Tinto Stadium |

| 14 April Friendly | Canada | Cancelled | Australia | Vancouver, Canada |
| 19:30 PST | | Cancellation | | Stadium: BC Place |

=== 2021 ===
| 10 April Friendly | Germany | 5–2 | Australia | Wiesbaden, Germany |
| 16:10 | Nüsken 11'; Hendrich 48'; Brand 62'; Freigang 64'; Dallmann 90+1' | Report | Gielnik 82', 90+2' | Stadium: Brita-Arena; Referee: Marta Frías Acedo (Spain) |

| 13 April Friendly | Netherlands | 5–0 | Australia | Nijmegen, Netherlands |
| 18:30 CEST | Roord 5'; Martens 20'; Groenen 27'; Beerensteyn 67'; van de Donk 70' | Report | | Stadium: Stadion de Goffert; Referee: Esther Staubli (Switzerland) |

| 10 June Friendly | Denmark | 3–2 | Australia | Horsens, Denmark |
| 18:00 CEST | Yallop 15' (o.g.); Sevecke 21'; Arnold 25' (o.g.) | Report | Fowler 87'; Polkinghorne 90+2' | Stadium: CASA Arena; Referee: Lina Lehtovaara (Finland) |

| 15 June Friendly | Sweden | 0–0 | Australia | Kalmar, Sweden |
| 18:45 CEST | | Report | | Stadium: Guldfågeln Arena; Referee: Ivana Martinčić (Croatia) |

| 14 July MS&AD CUP | Japan | 1–0 | Australia | Kameoka, Japan |
| 19:20 UTC+9 | Iwabuchi 54' (pen.) | Report | | Stadium: Sanga Stadium; Referee: Azusa Sugino (Japan) |

| 21 July Olympics GS | Australia | 2–1 | New Zealand | Tokyo, Japan |
| 20:30 | Yallop 20'; Kerr 33' | Report | Rennie 90+1' | Stadium: Tokyo Stadium; Attendance: 0 Referee: Lucila Venegas (Mexico) |

| 24 July Olympics GS | Sweden | 4–2 | Australia | Saitama, Japan |
| 17:30 | Rolfö 20', 63'; Hurtig 52'; Blackstenius 82' | Report | Kerr 36', 48' | Stadium: Saitama Stadium 2002; Attendance: 0 Referee: Edina Alves Batista (Brazil) |

| 27 July Olympics GS | United States | 0–0 | Australia | Kashima, Japan |
| 17:00 | | Report | | Stadium: Kashima Soccer Stadium; Attendance: 0 Referee: Anastasia Pustovoitova (Russia) |

| 30 July Olympics QF | Great Britain | 3–4 (a.e.t.) | Australia | Kashima, Japan |
| 18:00 | White 57', 66', 115' | Report | Kennedy 35'; Kerr 89', 106'; Fowler 103' | Stadium: Kashima Soccer Stadium; Attendance: 0 Referee: Salima Mukansanga (Rwanda) |

| 2 August Olympics SF | Australia | 0–1 | Sweden | Yokohama, Japan |
| 20:00 | Carpenter (red card) 90+6' | Report | Rolfö 46' | Stadium: International Stadium Yokohama; Attendance: 0 Referee: Melissa Borjas (Honduras) |

| 5 August Olympics BM | Australia | 3–4 | United States | Kashima, Japan |
| 17:00 | Kerr 17'; Foord 54'; Gielnik 90' | Report | Rapinoe 8', 21'; Lloyd 45+1', 51' | Stadium: Kashima Stadium; Attendance: 0 Referee: Laura Fortunato (Argentina) |

| 21 September Friendly | Republic of Ireland | 3–2 | Australia | Dublin, Republic of Ireland |
| 19:00 | Lu. Quinn 3'; O'Sullivan 23'; Lo. Quinn 49' | Report | Fowler 14', 45+1' | Stadium: Tallaght Stadium; Referee: Paula Brady (Republic of Ireland) |

| 23 October Friendly | Australia | 3–1 | Brazil | Sydney, Australia |
| 19:45 | Polkinghorne 38'; Fowler 66'; van Egmond 80' | Report | Adriana 68' | Stadium: CommBank Stadium; Attendance: 15,270; Referee: Esther Staubli (Switzerland) |

| 26 October Friendly | Australia | 2–2 | Brazil | Sydney, Australia |
| 20:00 | Polkinghorne 10'; Kerr 53' | Report | Érika 64'; Debinha 72' | Stadium: CommBank Stadium; Attendance: 12,087; Referee: Désirée Grundbacher (Switzerland) |

| 27 November Friendly | Australia | 0–3 | United States | Sydney, Australia |
| 15:00 | | Report | Hatch 1'; Lavelle 49'; Horan 68' (pen.) | Stadium: ANZ Stadium; Attendance: 36,109; Referee: Hyeon Jeong Oh (South Korea) |

| 30 November Friendly | Australia | 1–1 | United States | Newcastle, Australia |
| 20:05 | Simon 88' | Report | Hatch 4' | Stadium: McDonald Jones Stadium; Attendance: 20,495; Referee: Park Sejin (South Korea) |

=== 2022 ===
| 21 January 2022 AFC Women's Asian Cup GS | Australia | 18–0 | Indonesia | Mumbai, India |
| 15:30 UTC+5:30 | Kerr 9', 11', 26' (pen.), 36', 54'; Foord 14'; Fowler 17'; Raso 24', 88'; Carpenter 34', 49'; Van Egmond 39' (pen.), 57', 69'; Yallop 59'; Simon 68', 71'; Luik 79' | Report | | Stadium: Mumbai Football Arena; Referee: Mahsa Ghorbani (Iran) |

| 24 January 2022 AFC Women's Asian Cup GS | Philippines | 0–4 | Australia | Mumbai, India |
| 15:30 UTC+5:30 | | Report | Kerr 51'; Randle 53' (o.g.); van Egmond 67'; Fowler 87' | Stadium: Mumbai Football Arena; Referee: Wang Chieh (Chinese Taipei) |

| 27 January 2022 AFC Women's Asian Cup GS | Australia | 2–1 | Thailand | Mumbai, India |
| 19:30 UTC+5:30 | van Egmond 39'; Kerr 80' | Report | Nipawan 90+3' | Stadium: Mumbai Football Arena; Referee: Thein Thein Aye (Myanmar) |

| 30 January 2022 2022 AFC Women's Asian Cup QF | Australia | 0–1 | South Korea | Pune, India |
| 13:30 UTC+5:30 | | Report | Ji So-yun 87' | Stadium: Shiv Chhatrapati Sports Complex; Referee: Qin Liang (China PR) |

| 8 April Friendly | Australia | 2–1 | New Zealand | Townsville, Australia |
| 19:45 UTC+10 | van Egmond 90+3'; Kerr 90+5' | Report | Green 32' | Stadium: QCB Stadium; Attendance: 10,779; Referee: Asaka Koizumi (Japan) |

| 12 April Friendly | Australia | 3–1 | New Zealand | Canberra, Australia |
| 19:45 UTC+10 | Kerr 15', 32'; Raso 17' | Report | Wilkinson 45+3' | Stadium: GIO Stadium; Attendance: 13,077; Referee: Haruna Kanematsu (Japan) |

| 25 June Friendly | Spain | 7–0 | Australia | Huelva, Spain |
| 21:30 UTC+1 | Bonmatí 44'; Mariona 48'; González 53'; García 57', 81'; Guerrero 89', 90+1' | Report | | Stadium: Estadio Nuevo Colombino; Attendance: 6,869; Referee: Monika Mularczyk (Poland) |

| 28 June Friendly | Portugal | 1–1 | Australia | Estoril, Portugal |
| 21:00 UTC+1 | Encarnação 87' | Report | Ibini 73' | Stadium: Estádio António Coimbra da Mota; Referee: Victoria Beyer (France) |

| 3 September Friendly | Australia | 0–1 | Canada | Brisbane, Australia |
| 14:45 UTC+10 | | Report | Leon 11' | Stadium: Suncorp Stadium; Attendance: 25,016; Referee: Anna-Marie Keighley (New Zealand) |

| 6 September Friendly | Australia | 1–2 | Canada | Sydney, Australia |
| 19:40 UTC+10 | Fowler 3' | Report | Leon 48', 64' | Stadium: Sydney Football Stadium; Attendance: 26,997; Referee: Park Se-jin (South Korea) |

| 8 October Friendly | Australia | 4–1 | South Africa | London, England |
| 12:30 UTC+0 | Vine 5', 24'; Polkinghorne 42'; Foord 53' | Report | Magaia 87' | Stadium: Kingsmeadow; Referee: Lorraine Watson (Scotland) |

| 11 October Friendly | Denmark | 1–3 | Australia | Viborg, Denmark |
| 18:00 CEST (UTC+2) | Holmgaard 1' | Report | Foord 66', 76'; Gorry 74' | Stadium: Viborg Stadion; Referee: Sara Persson (Sweden) |

| 12 November Friendly | Australia | 4–0 | Sweden | Melbourne, Australia |
| 14:45 UTC+11 | Kerr 36'; Foord 51', 76'; Fowler 72' | Report | | Stadium: AAMI Park; Attendance: 22,065; Referee: Anna-Marie Keighley (New Zealand) |

| 15 November Friendly | Australia | 2–0 | Thailand | Gosford, Australia |
| 19:30 UTC+11 | Kerr 40'; Raso 47' | Report | | Stadium: Industree Group Stadium; Attendance: 11,271; Referee: Anna-Marie Keighley (New Zealand) |

=== 2023 ===
| 16 February 2023 Cup of Nations | Australia | 4–0 | Czech Republic | Gosford, Australia |
| 19:10 | Raso 48', 55'; Kerr 70'; Polkinghorne 84' | Report | | Stadium: Industree Group Stadium; Attendance: 7,702; Referee: Asaka Koizumi (Japan) |

| 19 February 2023 Cup of Nations | Australia | 3–2 | Spain | Sydney, Australia |
| 18:00 | Vine 11'; Polkinghorne 16'; Foord 42' | Report | Carmona 73'; Redondo 90+4' | Stadium: CommBank Stadium; Attendance: 17,333; Referee: Asaka Koizumi (Japan) |

| 22 February 2023 Cup of Nations | Australia | 3–0 | Jamaica | Newcastle, Australia |
| 19:10 | Gorry 28'; Chidiac 56'; Foord 69' | Report | | Stadium: McDonald Jones Stadium; Attendance: 9,093; Referee: Yoshimi Yamashita (Japan) |

| 7 April Friendly | Australia | 0–1 | Scotland | London, England |
| 13:45 | | Report | Docherty 47' | Stadium: Cherry Red Records Stadium; Referee: Louise Thompson (Northern Ireland) |

| 11 April Friendly | England | 0–2 | Australia | London, England |
| 19:45 | | Report | Kerr 32'; Grant 67' | Stadium: Brentford Community Stadium; Attendance: 14,489; Referee: Natalie Simon (United States) |

| 14 July Friendly | Australia | 1–0 | France | Melbourne, Australia |
| 19:30 UTC+10 | Fowler 66' | Report | | Stadium: Marvel Stadium; Attendance: 50,629; Referee: Asaka Koizumi (Japan) |

| 20 July 2023 World Cup GS | Australia | 1–0 | Republic of Ireland | Sydney, Australia |
| 20:00 UTC+10 | Catley 52' (pen.) | Report | | Stadium: Stadium Australia; Attendance: 75,784; Referee: Edina Alves Batista (Brazil) |

| 27 July 2023 World Cup GS | Australia | 2–3 | Nigeria | Brisbane, Australia |
| 20:00 UTC+10 | Van Egmond 45+1'; Kennedy 90+10' | Report | Kanu 45+6'; Ohale 65'; Oshoala 72' | Stadium: Lang Park; Attendance: 49,156; Referee: Esther Staubli (Switzerland) |

| 31 July 2023 World Cup GS | Canada | 0–4 | Australia | Melbourne, Australia |
| 20:00 UTC+10 | | Report | Raso 9', 39'; Fowler 58'; Catley 90+4' (pen.) | Stadium: Melbourne Rectangular Stadium; Attendance: 27,706; Referee: Stéphanie Frappart (France) |

| 7 August 2023 World Cup R16 | Australia | 2–0 | Denmark | Sydney, Australia |
| 20:30 UTC+10 | Foord 29'; Raso 70' | Report | | Stadium: Stadium Australia; Attendance: 75,784; Referee: Rebecca Welch (England) |

| 12 August 2023 World Cup QF | Australia | 0–0 (a.e.t.) (7–6 p) | France | Brisbane, Australia |
| 17:00 UTC+10 | | Report | | Stadium: Lang Park; Attendance: 49,461; Referee: María Carvajal (Chile) |
| | Penalties |
| | Foord (penalty scored); Catley (penalty missed); Kerr (penalty scored); Fowler (penalty scored); Arnold (penalty missed); Gorry (penalty scored); Yallop (penalty scored); Carpenter (penalty scored); Hunt (penalty missed); Vine (penalty scored) | | (penalty missed) Bacha; (penalty scored) Diani; (penalty scored) Renard; (penalty scored) Le Sommer; (penalty missed) Périsset; (penalty scored) Geyoro; (penalty scored) Karchaoui; (penalty scored) Lakrar; (penalty missed) Dali; (penalty missed) Bècho |

| 16 August 2023 World Cup SF | Australia | 1–3 | England | Sydney, Australia |
| 20:00 UTC+10 | Kerr 63' | Report | Toone 36'; Hemp 71'; Russo 86' | Stadium: Stadium Australia; Attendance: 75,784; Referee: Tori Penso (United States) |

| 19 August 2023 World Cup 3rd | Sweden | 2–0 | Australia | Brisbane, Australia |
| 18:00 UTC+10 | Rolfö 30' (pen.); Asllani 62' | Report | | Stadium: Lang Park; Attendance: 49,461; Referee: Cheryl Foster (Wales) |

| 26 October 2024 Olympic qualifiers R2 | Australia | 2–0 | Iran | Perth, Australia |
| 19:00 UTC+8 | Carpenter 19'; Kerr 78' | Report | | Stadium: Perth Rectangular Stadium; Attendance: 18,798; Referee: Oh Hyeon-jeong (South Korea) |

| 29 October 2024 Olympic qualifiers R2 | Philippines | 0–8 | Australia | Perth, Australia |
| 15:10 UTC+8 | | Report | Fowler 15'; Kerr 19', 45+2', 46'; Foord 30', 34', 56'; Wheeler 72' | Stadium: Perth Stadium; Attendance: 59,155; Referee: Ranjita Devi Tekcham (India) |

| 1 November 2024 Olympic qualifiers R2 | Australia | 3–0 | Chinese Taipei | Perth, Australia |
| 19:00 UTC+8 | Fowler 62'; Kerr 68'; Yallop 76' | Report | | Stadium: Perth Rectangular Stadium; Attendance: 19,084; Referee: Oh Hyeon-jeong (South Korea) |

| 1 December Friendly | Canada | 5–0 | Australia | Langford, Canada |
| 19:30 PST | Prince 10', 43'; Lacasse 49'; Awujo 55'; Leon 62' | Report | | Stadium: Starlight Stadium; Attendance: 6,102; Referee: Deily Gómez (Costa Rica) |

| 5 December Friendly | Canada | 1–0 | Australia | Vancouver, Canada |
| 19:00 PST | Quinn 40' | Report | | Stadium: Christine Sinclair Place; Attendance: 48,112; Referee: Katja Koroleva (United States) |

=== 2024 ===
| 24 February 2024 Olympic Qualifiers R3 | Uzbekistan | 0–3 | Australia | Tashkent, Uzbekistan |
| 14:00 UTC+5 | | Report | Heyman 72'; Fowler 84'; Foord 86' | Stadium: Milliy Stadium; Attendance: 2,347; Referee: Oh Hyeon-jeong (South Korea) |

| 28 February 2024 Olympic Qualifiers R3 | Australia | 10–0 (13–0 agg.) | Uzbekistan | Melbourne, Australia |
| 20:10 UTC+11 | Asadova 1' (o.g.); Heyman 4', 8', 16', 45+2'; Torpey 22'; Fowler 36'; Foord 38'; Raso 68'; Sayer 90+4' | Report | | Stadium: Docklands Stadium; Attendance: 54,120; Referee: Yoshimi Yamashita (Japan) |

| 9 April Friendly | Mexico | 0–2 | Australia | San Antonio, United States |
| 19:00 UTC-5 | | Report | Raso 9'; Foord 52' | Stadium: Toyota Field; Referee: Natalie Simon (United States) |

| 31 May Friendly | Australia | 1–1 | China | Adelaide, Australia |
| 19:40 UTC+09:30 | Heyman 90+5' | Report | Zhang 30' | Stadium: Adelaide Oval; Attendance: 52,912; Referee: Kim Yu-jeong (South Korea) |

| 3 June Friendly | Australia | 2–0 | China | Sydney, Australia |
| 19:30 UTC+10:00 | Wheeler 48'; Raso 56' | Report | | Stadium: Accor Stadium; Attendance: 76,798; Referee: Oh Hyun-jung (South Korea) |

| 13 July 'B' Friendly | Australia | 1–2 | Canada | Marbella, Spain |
| 21:00 UTC+02:00 | Freier 23' | Report | Prince 41'; Viens 85' | Attendance: 0 (behind closed doors) |

| 25 July 2024 Olympics GS | Germany | 3–0 | Australia | Marseille, France |
| 19:00 UTC+2 | Hegering 24'; Schüller 64'; Brand 68' | Report | | Stadium: Stade de Marseille; Referee: Katia García (Mexico) |

| 28 July 2024 Olympics GS | Australia | 6–5 | Zambia | Nice, France |
| 19:00 UTC+2 | Kennedy 7'; Raso 35'; Musole 58' (o.g.); Catley 65', 78' (pen.); Heyman 90' | Report | B. Banda 1', 33', 45+2'; Kundananji 21', 56' | Stadium: Stade de Nice; Referee: Emikar Calderas (Venezuela) |

| 31 July 2024 Olympics GS | Australia | 1–2 | United States | Marseille, France |
| 19:00 UTC+2 | Kennedy 90+2' | Report | Rodman 43'; Albert 77' | Stadium: Stade de Marseille; Referee: François Letexier (France) |

| 25 October Friendly | Switzerland | 1–1 | Australia | Zurich, Switzerland |
| 20:00 UTC+2 | Reuteler 58' | Report | Foord 43' (pen.) | Stadium: Stadion Letzigrund; Attendance: 14,370; Referee: Shona Shukrula (Netherlands) |

| 28 October Friendly | Germany | 1–2 | Australia | Duisburg, Germany |
| 18:10 UTC+1 | Cerci 5' | Report | Cooney-Cross 39'; Hunt 77' | Stadium: Schauinsland-Reisen-Arena; Attendance: 26,623; Referee: Maria Marotta (Italy) |

| 28 November Friendly | Australia | 1–3 | Brazil | Brisbane, Australia |
| 20:00 UTC+10 | Foord 43' | Report | Gutierres 6', 13'; Queiroz 54' | Stadium: Suncorp Stadium; Attendance: 47,501; Referee: Oh Hyun-jung (South Korea) |

| 1 December Friendly | Australia | 1–2 | Brazil | Gold Coast, Australia |
| 18:35 UTC+10 | Raso 42' | Report | Portilho 30'; Lauren 40' | Stadium: Cbus Super Stadium; Attendance: 25,297 |

| 4 December Friendly | Australia | 3–1 | Chinese Taipei | Melbourne, Australia |
| 20:00 UTC+11 | Prior 10'; Freier 12'; Henry 78' | Report | Chen 34' | Stadium: AAMI Park; Attendance: 26,795; Referee: Haruna Kanematsu (Japan) |

| 7 December Friendly | Australia | 6–0 | Chinese Taipei | Geelong, Australia |
| 19:30 UTC+11 | Davidson 6'; Yallop 11'; Gielnik 40'; Heyman 56'; Prior 73'; Freier 78' | Report | | Stadium: GMHBA Stadium; Attendance: 30,097; Referee: Azusa Sugino (Japan) |

=== 2025 ===
| 20 February 2025 SheBelieves Cup | Japan | 4–0 | Australia | Houston, United States |
| 16:00 UTC-6 | Tanaka 6', 32'; Hamano 52'; Minami 75' | Report | | Stadium: Shell Energy Stadium; Attendance: 5,243; Referee: Natalie Simon (United States) |

| 23 February 2025 SheBelieves Cup | United States | 2–1 | Australia | Glendale, United States |
| 15:00 UTC-7 | Biyendolo 1'; Cooper 68' | Report | Heyman 80' | Stadium: State Farm Stadium; Attendance: 23,503; Referee: Amairany Garcia (Mexico) |

| 26 February 2025 SheBelieves Cup | Australia | 1–2 | Colombia | San Diego, United States |
| 16:30 UTC-8 | Raso 69' | Report | Bonilla 15'; Usme 73' | Stadium: Snapdragon Stadium; Attendance: 10,071; Referee: Katja Koroleva (United States) |

| 4 April Friendly | Australia | 1–0 | South Korea | Sydney, Australia |
| 20:00 UTC+11 | Lim 54' (o.g.) | Report | | Stadium: Allianz Stadium; Attendance: 37,199; Referee: Yoshimi Yamashita (Japan) |

| 7 April Friendly | Australia | 2–0 | South Korea | Newcastle, Australia |
| 19:30 UTC+10 | Fowler 43'; Lim 63' (o.g.) | Report | | Stadium: McDonald Jones Stadium; Attendance: 28,019 |

| 30 May Friendly | Australia | 2–0 | Argentina | Melbourne, Australia |
| 20:00 UTC+10 | Johnson 38'; Torpey 69' | Report | | Stadium: Marvel Stadium; Attendance: 43,020 |

| 2 June Friendly | Australia | 4–1 | Argentina | Canberra, Australia |
| 19:30 UTC+10 | Sayer 14', 36'; van Egmond 72'; Heyman 83' | Report | Núñez 23' | Stadium: GIO Stadium; Attendance: 25,125; Referee: Supiree Testhomya (Thailand) |

| 26 June Friendly | Australia | 3–0 | Slovenia | Perth, Australia |
| 19:00 UTC+8 | Gielnik 3'; McNamara 86'; Raso 87' | Report | | Stadium: HBF Park; Attendance: 8,678; Referee: Todrikan Delai (Fiji) |

| 29 June Friendly | Australia | 1–1 | Slovenia | Perth, Australia |
| 18:00 UTC+8 | Heyman 50' | Report | Kastelec 90+1' | Stadium: HBF Park; Attendance: 13,115; Referee: Anna-Marie Keighley (New Zealand) |

| 5 July Friendly | Australia | 0–1 | Panama | Bunbury, Australia |
| 14:30 UTC+8 | | Report | King 59' | Stadium: Hands Oval; Attendance: 10,272; Referee: Anna-Marie Keighley (New Zealand) |

| 8 July Friendly | Australia | 3–2 | Panama | Perth, Australia |
| 18:00 UTC+8 | Heyman 54', 65'; Grant 90+1' | Report | Arauz 34'; Cedeño 83' | Stadium: HBF Park; Attendance: 10,657; Referee: Anna-Marie Keighley (New Zealand) |

| 25 October Friendly | Wales | 1–2 | Australia | Cardiff, Wales |
| 14:00 UTC+1 | Griffiths 55' | Report | Nevin 27'; Foord 85' | Stadium: Cardiff City Stadium; Attendance: 11,173; Referee: Stacey Pearson (England) |

| 28 October Friendly | England | 3–0 | Australia | Derby, England |
| 19:00 UTC+0 | Beever-Jones 20'; Bronze 40'; Stanway 90+8' (pen.) | Report | | Stadium: Pride Park Stadium; Attendance: 26,544; Referee: Iuliana Demetrescu (Romania) |

| 28 November Friendly | Australia | 5–0 | New Zealand | Gosford, Australia |
| 19:30 UTC+11 | Sayer 13'; Raso 24'; Carpenter 70'; Cooney-Cross 71'; Gorry 90+2' | Report | | Stadium: polytec Stadium; Attendance: 20,519; Referee: Kim Yu-jeong (South Korea) |

| 2 December Friendly | Australia | 2–0 | New Zealand | Adelaide, Australia |
| 20:00 UTC+10:30 | Kennedy 19'; Raso 70' | Report | | Stadium: Coopers Stadium; Attendance: 15,097; Referee: Hong Yu (China) |

=== 2026 ===
| 1 March 2026 Asian Cup GS | Australia | 1–0 | Philippines | Perth, Australia |
| 17:00 UTC+8 | Kerr 14' | Report | | Stadium: Perth Stadium; Attendance: 44,379; Referee: Dong Fangyu (China) |

| 5 March 2026 Asian Cup GS | Iran | 0–4 | Australia | Gold Coast, Australia |
| 19:00 UTC+10 | | Report | Sayer 8'; Fowler 27'; Kennedy 35', 58' | Stadium: Gold Coast Stadium; Attendance: 22,398; Referee: Asaka Koizumi (Japan) |

| 8 March 2026 Asian Cup GS | Australia | 3–3 | South Korea | Sydney, Australia |
| 20:00 UTC+11 | Kennedy 32', 90+8'; Kerr 45+6' | Report | Mun Eun-ju 13'; Kim Shin-ji 53' (pen.); Kang Chae-rim 56' | Stadium: Stadium Australia; Attendance: 60,279; Referee: Yoshimi Yamashita (Japan) |

| 13 March 2026 Asian Cup QF | Australia | 2–1 | North Korea | Perth, Australia |
| 18:00 UTC+8 | Kennedy 9'; Kerr 47' | Report | Chae Un-yong 65' | Stadium: Perth Rectangular Stadium; Attendance: 16,466; Referee: Veronika Bernatskaia (Kyrgyzstan) |

| 17 March 2026 Asian Cup SF | China | 1–2 | Australia | Perth, Australia |
| 18:00 UTC+8 | Zhang Linyan 26' (pen.) | Report | Foord 17'; Kerr 58' | Stadium: Perth Stadium; Attendance: 35,170; Referee: Supiree Testhomya (Thailand) |

| 21 March 2026 Asian Cup Final | Japan | 1–0 | Australia | Sydney, Australia |
| 20:00 UTC+11 | Hamano 17' | Report | | Stadium: Stadium Australia; Attendance: 74,397; Referee: Kim Yu-jeong (South Korea) |

| 11 April 2026 FIFA Series | Australia | 5–0 | Malawi | Nairobi, Kenya |
| 14:00 UTC+3 | van Egmond 5'; Kerr 41'; Chidiac 60'; McNamara 86'; McKenna 90+4' | Report | | Stadium: Nyayo National Stadium; Referee: Emmanuela Clement (South Sudan) |

| 15 April 2026 FIFA Series | Kenya | 0–2 | Australia | Nairobi, Kenya |
| 17:30 UTC+3 | | Report | Kerr 25'; Wheeler 54' | Stadium: Nyayo National Stadium; Referee: Yordanos Mulugeta (Ethiopia) |

| 6 June Friendly | Australia | 0–1 | Mexico | Newcastle, Australia |
| 19:15 UTC+10 | | Report | Ordóñez 90+2' | Stadium: McDonald Jones Stadium; Attendance: 23,167; Referee: Lorraine Watson (Scotland) |

| 9 June Friendly | Australia | 3–1 | Mexico | Sydney, Australia |
| 19:00 UTC+10 | Kennedy 22'; Barreras 36' (o.g.); Foord 70' | Report | Ordóñez 26' | Stadium: CommBank Stadium; Attendance: 18,441; Referee: Stacey Pearson (England) |

| 9 October Friendly | Germany | 4–2 | Australia | Karlsruhe, Germany |
| 20:30 UTC+1 | Kössler 23', 30'; Küver 83'; Nüsken 90+4' | Report | Kerr 45+2'; McNamara 90+2' | Stadium: Wildparkstadion; Attendance: 26,352; Referee: Olivia Tschon (Austria) |

| 13 October Friendly | Haiti | 1–7 | Australia | Chambly, France |
| 21:00 UTC+1 | Dumornay 3' | Report | McKenna 2', 44'; K. Louis 53' (o.g.); Foord 65'; Galic 72'; Wheeler 79'; McNamara 89' | Stadium: Stade Walter-Luzi; Referee: Jelena Medjedovic (Serbia) |

== See also ==
- Australia women's national soccer team results (1975–1999)
- Australia women's national soccer team results (2000–2009)
- Australia women's national soccer team results (2010–2019)
