= Australia women's national soccer team results (2010–2019) =

The Australia women's national soccer team results for the period 2010 to 2019.

== Match results ==
Win Draw Loss Cancelled

=== 2010 ===
17 February 2010 Friendly	New Zealand	0–3	Australia	Auckland, New Zealand
		Report	Walsh 23', 52'; De Vanna 84'	Stadium: North Harbour Stadium; Attendance: 1,853; Referee: Mike Hester (New Zealand)

20 February 2010 Friendly	New Zealand	0–3	Australia	Auckland, New Zealand
		Report	Garriock 37'; De Vanna 49'; Khamis 84'	Stadium: Bill McKinlay Park

3 March 2010 Friendly	Australia	2–2	North Korea	Brisbane, Australia
	Gill 50'; De Vanna 68'	Report	Yun Hyon-Hi 14', 86'	Stadium: Spencer Park; Attendance: 0 (closed doors); Referee: Jacqui Melksham

6 March 2010 Friendly	Australia	3–2	North Korea	Brisbane, Australia
	Walsh 25'; Gill 45' (pen.); Simon 90'	Report	Jo Yun Mi 33'; Kim Yong Hui 53'	Stadium: Ballymore Stadium; Referee: Sarah Hodson

19 May 2010 Asian Cup	Australia	2–0	Vietnam	Chengdu, China
	Khamis 29'; Ledbrook 51' (pen.)	Report		Stadium: Chengdu Sports Centre; Attendance: 1,000; Referee: Ri Hyang-ok (North Korea)

21 May 2010 Asian Cup	South Korea	1–3	Australia	Chengdu, China
	Kang Sun-Mi 71'	Report	Carroll 52'; De Vanna 59'; Kerr 66'	Stadium: Chengdu Sports Centre; Attendance: 600; Referee: Sachiko Yamagishi (Japan)

23 May 2010 Asian Cup	China	1–0	Australia	Chengdu, China
	Zhang Rui 9'	Report		Stadium: Chengdu Sports Centre; Attendance: 11,000; Referee: Sachiko Yamagishi (Japan)

27 May 2010 Asian Cup	Japan	0–1	Australia	Chengdu, China
		Report	Gill 45+1'	Stadium: Chengdu Sports Centre; Attendance: 1,200; Referee: Pannipar Kamnueng (Thailand)

30 May 2010 Asian Cup – Final	Australia	1–1 (a.e.t.) (5–4 p)	North Korea	Chengdu, China
	Kerr 19'	Report	Jo Yun-Mi 73'	Stadium: Chengdu Sports Centre; Attendance: 1,200; Referee: Sachiko Yamagichi (Japan)
	Penalties
	Shipard (penalty scored); Ledbrook (penalty scored); Gill (penalty scored); Garriock (penalty scored); Simon (penalty scored)		(penalty scored) Jo Yun-mi; (penalty missed) Yun Song-Mi; (penalty scored) Choe Yong-Sim; (penalty scored) Yu Jong-Hui; (penalty scored) Mun Chol-Mi

17 October 2010 Peace Queen Cup	Australia	3–1	Mexico	Suwon, South Korea
	McCallum 26'; Gill 29'; Shipard 63'	Report	Domínguez 64'	Stadium: Suwon World Cup Stadium

19 October 2010 Peace Queen Cup	Chinese Taipei	0–1	Australia	Suwon, South Korea
		Report	Gill 17'	Stadium: Suwon World Cup Stadium

21 October 2010 Peace Queen Cup – Final	South Korea	2–1	Australia	Suwon, South Korea
	Kim Na-Rae 16'; Jeon Ga-Eul 56'	Report	Gill 57'	Stadium: Suwon World Cup Stadium; Attendance: 15,000; Referee: Kamuneng Pannipar (Thailand)

28 October 2010 Friendly	Germany	2–1	Australia	Wolfsburg, Germany
	Grings 16'; Müller 56'	Report	Kerr 28'	Attendance: 7,229; Referee: Tanja Schett (Austria)

=== 2011 ===
12 May 2011 Friendly	Australia	3–0	New Zealand	Gosford, Australia
	Foord 10'; Simon 79'; Khamis 85'	Report		Stadium: Central Coast Stadium; Attendance: 0 (closed doors); Referee: Jacqui Melksham

15 May 2011 Friendly	Australia	2–1	New Zealand	Gosford, Australia
	Cannuli 9'; McCallum 55'	Report	Wilkinson 27'	Stadium: Central Coast Stadium; Attendance: 2,866; Referee: Kate Jacewicz

20 June 2011 Friendly	Australia	3–2	Mexico	Göttingen, Germany
	Colthorpe 43'; Shipard 45'; Simon 63'	Report	Ocampo 32'; Domínguez 35' (pen.)	Stadium: Jahn-Stadion; Referee: Riem Hussein (Germany)

23 June 2011 Friendly	Australia	2–0	England	Wolfsburg, Germany
	McCallum 15' (pen.), 28'	Report		Stadium: Nachwuchs Leistungs Zentrum; Referee: Riem Hussein (Germany)

29 June 2011 FIFA Women's World Cup	Brazil	1–0	Australia	Mönchengladbach, Germany
	Rosana 54'	Report		Stadium: Borussia-Park; Attendance: 27,258; Referee: Jenny Palmqvist (Sweden)

3 July 2011 FIFA Women's World Cup	Australia	3–2	Equatorial Guinea	Bochum, Germany
	Khamis 8' van Egmond 48'; De Vanna 51'	Report	Añonma 21' (pen.), 83'	Stadium: Ruhrstadion; Attendance: 15,640; Referee: Gyöngyi Gaál (Hungary)

6 July 2011 FIFA Women's World Cup	Australia	2–1	Norway	Leverkusen, Germany
	Simon 57', 87'	Report	Thorsnes 56'	Stadium: BayArena; Attendance: 18,474; Referee: Estela Álvarez (Argentina)

10 July 2011 FIFA Women's World Cup	Sweden	3–1	Australia	Augsburg, Germany
	Sjögran 10'; Dahlkvist 16'; Schelin 52'	Report	Perry 40'	Stadium: Impuls Arena; Attendance: 24,605; Referee: Silvia Reyes (Peru)

1 September 2011 2012 Olympics qualifiers	North Korea	1–0	Australia	Jinan, China
	Kim Su-Gyong 10'	Report		Stadium: Jinan Olympic Sports Center; Attendance: 800; Referee: Alexandros Dimitropoulos (Greece)

3 September 2011 2012 Olympics qualifiers	Australia	5–1	Thailand	Jinan, China
	Simon 13'; Heyman 15', 34'; Butt 45' van Egmond 58'	Report	Taneekarn 59'	Stadium: Jinan Olympic Sports Center; Attendance: 200; Referee: Silvia Tea Spinelli (Italy)

5 September 2011 2012 Olympics qualifiers	Japan	1–0	Australia	Jinan, China
	Kawasumi 62'	Report		Stadium: Shandong Provincial Stadium; Attendance: 1,000; Referee: Mitsi Efthalia (Greece)

8 September 2011 2012 Olympics qualifiers	Australia	1–0	China	Jinan, China
	van Egmond 61'	Report		Stadium: Jinan Olympic Sports Center; Attendance: 10,167; Referee: Heikkinen Katja Maria Kirsi (Finland)

11 September 2011 2012 Olympics qualifiers	South Korea	1–2	Australia	Jinan, China
	Kwon Hah-Nul 27'	Report	De Vanna 62'; Butt 76'	Stadium: Shandong Provincial Stadium; Attendance: 765; Referee: Mitsi Efthalia (Greece)

=== 2012 ===
24 June 2012 Friendly	Australia	1–1	New Zealand	Wollongong, Australia
	Slatyer 90'	Report	Moorwood (Bowden) 50'	Stadium: WIN Stadium; Attendance: 3,677; Referee: Casey Reibelt

27 June 2012 Friendly	Australia	2–0	New Zealand	Wollongong, Australia
	Walsh 30', 57'	Report		Stadium: WIN Stadium

11 July 2012 Kirin Challenge Cup	Japan	3–0	Australia	Tokyo, Japan
	Miyama 26' (pen.); Ōgimi 45'; Sawa 59'	Report		Stadium: National Olympic Stadium (Tokyo); Attendance: 20,000

13 September 2012 Friendly	Haiti	0–4	Australia	Indianapolis, United States
		Report	Brown 6'; Gill 12'; Simon 15'; Heyman 83'	Stadium: Carroll Stadium; Referee: Michelle Cowman (United States)

16 September 2012 Friendly	United States	2–1	Australia	Carson, United States
	Morgan 55'; Boxx 63' (pen.)	Report	De Vanna 34'	Stadium: Home Depot Center; Attendance: 19,851; Referee: Kari Seitz (United States)

19 September 2012 Friendly	United States	6–2	Australia	Denver, United States
	Uzunlar 25' (o.g.); Morgan 43', 63'; Wambach 53'; Boxx 69'; Leroux 82'	Report	De Vanna 32'; Walsh 35'	Stadium: DSG Park; Attendance: 18,589; Referee: Kristin Schiereck (United States)

20 November 2012 East Asian Cup second preliminary round	Australia	7–0	Chinese Taipei	Shenzhen, China
	Gill 5', 90+3'; De Vanna 22', 51'; Simon 45+1', 83'; Uzunlar 77'	Report		Stadium: Shenzhen Stadium; Attendance: 523; Referee: Kajiyama Fusako (Japan)

22 November 2012 East Asian Cup second preliminary round	Australia	4–0	Hong Kong	Shenzhen, China
	Butt 33'; Simon 64'; Gill 79'; Catley 90+2'	Report		Stadium: Shenzhen Stadium; Attendance: 488; Referee: Park Ji-Yeong (South Korea)

24 November 2012 East Asian Cup second preliminary round	China	2–1	Australia	Shenzhen, China
	Wang Li-Si 9'; Zhang Rui 50'	Report	Gill 12'	Stadium: Shenzhen Stadium; Attendance: 6,333; Referee: Ri Hong-sil (North Korea)

=== 2013 ===
13 June 2013 Friendly	Australia	1–0	New Zealand	Canberra, Australia
	Heyman 41'	Report		Stadium: AIS Athletics Track; Referee: Kate Jacewicz

16 June 2013 Centenary Cup	Australia	1–1 (4–2 p)	New Zealand	Canberra, Australia
	Polkinghorne 11'	Report	Gregorius 38'	Stadium: McKellar Park; Attendance: 2,248; Referee: Qin Liang (China)
	Penalties
	Kellond-Knight (penalty scored) van Egmond (penalty scored); Uzunlar (penalty scored); Kerr (penalty scored)		Hearn (penalty missed); Hoyle (penalty missed); Stott (penalty scored); Wilkinson (penalty scored)

29 June 2013 Friendly	Netherlands	3–1	Australia	IJmuiden, Netherlands
	Martens 12', 58'; Spitse 83'	Report	Gorry 27'	Stadium: TATA Steel Stadion; Referee: Riem Hussein (Germany)

6 July 2013 Friendly	France	0–2	Australia	Angers, France
20:30 CEST		Report	Butt 35'; Gorry 70'	Stadium: Stade Jean-Bouin

20 October 2013 Friendly	United States	4–0	Australia	San Antonio, United States
18:00 CST	Holiday 6'; Lloyd 14'; Wambach 56'; Press 90+2'	Report		Stadium: Alamodome; Attendance: 19,109; Referee: Kari Seitz (United States)

24 November 2013 Friendly	Australia	2–0	China	Wollongong, Australia
15:00 AEDT	Gorry 34'; Butt 39'	Report		Stadium: WIN Stadium; Referee: Fusako Kajiyama (Japan)

27 November 2013 Friendly	Australia	2–1	China	Parramatta, Australia
19:00 AEDT	De Vanna 30' van Egmond 57'	Report	Li 73' (pen.)	Stadium: Pirtek Stadium; Referee: Nami Sato (Japan)

=== 2014 ===
5 March 2014 2014 Cyprus Cup	Netherlands	2–2	Australia	Larnaca, Cyprus
	Miedema 12' van der Gragt 34'	Report	Gorry 54'; Heyman 59'	Stadium: GSZ Stadium; Referee: Linn Andersson (Sweden)

7 March 2014 2014 Cyprus Cup	France	3–2	Australia	Nicosia, Cyprus
	Delie 9'; Thomis 24'; Nécib 37'	Report	Kerr 52' van Egmond 62' (pen.)	Stadium: GSP Stadium

10 March 2014 2014 Cyprus Cup	Australia	2–4	Scotland	Larnaca, Cyprus
	Carroll (yellow card) 28' (red card) 90+1'; Heyman 64', 74'	Report	Evans 12'; J. Ross 28', 30', 70'	Stadium: GSZ Stadium; Referee: Jenny Palmqvist (Sweden)

12 March 2014 2014 Cyprus Cup	Australia	5–2	Italy	Paralimni, Cyprus
	Kerr 17' van Egmond 22', 38'; Gorry 56'; Raso 79'	Report	Tuttino 86'; Panico 90+1'	Stadium: Tasos Markos Stadium

6 April 2014 Friendly	Australia	0–1	Brazil	Brisbane, Australia
		Report	Debinha 68'	Stadium: QSAC; Attendance: 2,583; Referee: Nami Inazumi (Japan)

9 April 2014 Friendly	Australia	2–1	Brazil	Brisbane, Australia
	Gill 37'; Heyman 81'	Report	Gomes 53'	Stadium: QSAC; Referee: Rikako Kawahara (Japan)

14 May 2014 2014 AFC Women's Asian Cup	Australia	2–2	Japan	Ho Chi Minh City, Vietnam
	Foord 21'; De Vanna 64'	Report	Polkinghorne 71' (o.g.); Ōgimi 84'	Stadium: Thống Nhất Stadium; Attendance: 2,000; Referee: Qin Liang (China)

16 May 2014 2014 AFC Women's Asian Cup	Jordan	1–3	Australia	Ho Chi Minh City, Vietnam
	Al-Naber 71'	Report	Gill 36', 51'; Gorry 67'	Stadium: Thống Nhất Stadium; Attendance: 1,200; Referee: Ri Hyang-Ok (North Korea)

18 May 2014 2014 AFC Women's Asian Cup	Vietnam	0–2	Australia	Ho Chi Minh City, Vietnam
		Report	Thương 42' (o.g.); Gorry 90'	Stadium: Thống Nhất Stadium; Attendance: 3,000; Referee: Pannipar Kamnueng (Thailand)

22 May 2014 2014 AFC Women's Asian Cup Semi-final	South Korea	1–2	Australia	Ho Chi Minh City, Vietnam
	Park 53' (pen.)	Report	Gorry 47'; Kellond-Knight 77'	Stadium: Thống Nhất Stadium; Attendance: 700; Referee: Rita Gani (Malaysia)

25 May 2014 2014 AFC Women's Asian Cup Final	Japan	1–0	Australia	Ho Chi Minh City, Vietnam
	Iwashimizu 28'	Report		Stadium: Thống Nhất Stadium; Attendance: 10,000; Referee: Qin Liang (China)

=== 2015 ===
10 February 2015 Friendly	North Korea	1–2	Australia	Auckland, New Zealand
	Kim Yun-Mi 14'	Report	Polkinghorne 11'; Heyman 37'	Stadium: Bill McKinlay Park

12 February 2015 Friendly	New Zealand	2–3	Australia	Auckland, New Zealand
	Gregorius 57', 83'	Report	van Egmond 9'; Heyman 12'; Foord 29'	Stadium: Bill McKinlay Park

4 March 2015 2015 Cyprus Cup	Netherlands	0–1	Australia	Larnaca, Cyprus
		Report	Crummer 73'	Stadium: GSZ Stadium

6 March 2015 2015 Cyprus Cup	Australia	0–3	England	Nicosia, Cyprus
			Taylor 8', 17', 83'	Stadium: GSP Stadium

9 March 2015 2015 Cyprus Cup	Australia	3–0	Finland	Larnaca, Cyprus
	Gill 29'; Sykes 77' van Egmond 89'	report		Stadium: GSZ Stadium

11 March 2015 2015 Cyprus Cup	Australia	6–2	Czech Republic	Paralimni, Cyprus
	Gorry 8' van Egmond 15'; De Vanna 34'; Heyman 54'; Polkinghorne 85'; Sykes 86'	Report	Benýrová 8', 63'	Stadium: Paralimni Stadium

7 April 2015 Friendly	Austria	2–1	Australia	Villach, Austria
	Schiechtl 25'; Makas 28'	Report	Gorry 85'	Stadium: Stadion Villach Lind

9 April 2015 Friendly	Scotland	1–1	Australia	Falkirk, Scotland
	Ross 59'	Report	Alleway 26'	Stadium: Falkirk Stadium

19 May 2015 Friendly	Australia	4–0	Vietnam	Sydney, Australia
	Catley 17'; Foord 29'; Simon 47'; Heyman 48'	Report		Stadium: Valentine Sports Park; Attendance: 0 (behind closed doors)

21 May 2015 Friendly	Australia	11–0	Vietnam	Sydney, Australia
	Gorry 7'; Heyman 12', 19', 30'; Alleway 14'; De Vanna 15', 61'; Kerr 18', 48' van Egmond 21'; Foord 84'	Report		Stadium: Jubilee Oval; Attendance: 4,277

8 June 2015 2015 FIFA Women's World Cup Group D	United States	3–1	Australia	Winnipeg, Canada
	Rapinoe 12', 78'; Press 61'	Report	De Vanna 27'	Stadium: Winnipeg Stadium; Attendance: 31,148; Referee: Claudia Umpiérrez (Uruguay)

12 June 2015 2015 FIFA Women's World Cup Group D	Australia	2–0	Nigeria	Winnipeg, Canada
	Simon 29', 68'	Report		Stadium: Winnipeg Stadium; Attendance: 32,716; Referee: Stéphanie Frappart (France)

16 June 2015 2015 FIFA Women's World Cup Group D	Australia	1–1	Sweden	Edmonton, Canada
	De Vanna 5'	Report	Jakobsson 15'	Stadium: Commonwealth Stadium; Attendance: 10,177; Referee: Lucila Venegas (Mexico)

21 June 2015 2015 FIFA Women's World Cup round of 16	Brazil	0–1	Australia	Moncton, Canada
		Report	Simon 80'	Stadium: Moncton Stadium; Attendance: 12,054; Referee: Teodora Albon (Romania)

27 June 2015 2015 FIFA Women's World Cup quarterfinals	Australia	0–1	Japan	Edmonton, Canada
		Report	Iwabuchi 87'	Stadium: Commonwealth Stadium; Attendance: 19,814; Referee: Kateryna Monzul (Ukraine)

17 September 2015 Friendly	United States	Cancelled	Australia	Detroit, United States
		Cancellation

20 September 2015 Friendly	United States	Cancelled	Australia	Birmingham, United States
		Cancellation

25 October 2015 Dewellbon Cup	China	1–1	Australia	Chongqing, China
	Li D. 41' (pen.)	Report	Butt 12'

27 October 2015 Dewellbon Cup	England	1–0	Australia	Chongqing, China
	Christiansen 51'	Report (FFA); Report (FA)		Attendance: 1,800; Referee: Liang Qin (China)

29 November 2015 Friendly	South Korea	0–1	Australia	Incheon, South Korea
14:15 (UTC+9)		Report	Simon 68'	Stadium: Incheon Sungui Stadium

=== 2016 ===
29 February 2016 2016 Summer Olympics qualifiers	Australia	3–1	Japan	Osaka, Japan
19:35 (UTC+9)	De Vanna 25'; Heyman 41'; Gorry 78'	Report (FFA); Report (AFC)	Ōgimi 45+2'	Stadium: Kincho Stadium; Attendance: 4,988; Referee: Carina Vitulano (Italy)

2 March 2016 2016 Summer Olympics qualifiers	Australia	9–0	Vietnam	Osaka, Japan
16:35 (UTC+9)	Gielnik 10'; Simon 17', 38', 43'; Kennedy 19'; Sykes 64'; van Egmond 68'; Heyman 77'; Polkinghorne 85'	Report (FFA); Report (AFC)		Stadium: Nagai Stadium; Attendance: 129; Referee: Esther Staubli (Switzerland)

4 March 2016 2016 Summer Olympics qualifiers	South Korea	0–2	Australia	Osaka, Japan
19:35 (UTC+9)		Report (FFA); Report (AFC)	Simon 1'; van Egmond 15' (pen.)	Stadium: Nagai Stadium; Attendance: 1,149; Referee: Lucila Venegas (Mexico)

7 March 2016 2016 Summer Olympics qualifiers	North Korea	1–2	Australia	Osaka, Japan
19:35 (UTC+9)	Kim 78'	Report (FFA); Report (AFC)	Heyman 18'; Gorry 84'	Stadium: Nagai Stadium; Attendance: 900; Referee: Anna-Marie Keighley (New Zealand)

9 March 2016 2016 Summer Olympics qualifiers	Australia	1–1	China	Osaka, Japan
19:35 (UTC+9)	van Egmond 85'	Report (FFA); Report (AFC)	Ma 16'	Stadium: Nagai Stadium; Attendance: 4,766; Referee: Esther Staubli (Switzerland)

4 June 2016 Friendly	Australia	2–0	New Zealand	Ballarat, Australia
15:00 (UTC+10)	Foord 5', 51'	Report		Stadium: Morshead Park; Attendance: 4,371; Referee: Yoshimi Yamashita (Japan)

7 June 2016 Friendly	Australia	1–1	New Zealand	Melbourne, Australia
17:00 (UTC+10)	De Vanna 73'	Report	Bowen 64'	Stadium: Etihad Stadium; Attendance: 8,604

23 July 2016 Friendly	Brazil	3–1	Australia	Fortaleza, Brazil
16:00 BRT	Debinha 61'; Raquel 73'; Darlene 90+4'	Report	Crummer 35'	Stadium: Estádio Presidente Vargas; Referee: Ana Karina Marques (Brazil)

3 August 2016 2016 Summer Olympics GS	Canada	2–0	Australia	São Paulo, Brazil
15:00 BRT	Beckie 1'; Sinclair 80'	Report		Stadium: Arena Corinthians; Attendance: 20,521; Referee: Stéphanie Frappart (France)

6 August 2016 2016 Summer Olympics GS	Germany	2–2	Australia	São Paulo, Brazil
18:00 BRT	Däbritz 45+2'; Bartusiak 88'	Report	Kerr 6'; Foord 45'	Stadium: Arena Corinthians; Attendance: 37,475; Referee: Anna-Marie Keighley (New Zealand)

9 August 2016 2016 Summer Olympics GS	Australia	6–1	Zimbabwe	Salvador, Brazil
16:00 BRT	De Vanna 2'; Polkinghorne 15'; Kennedy 37'; Simon 50'; Heyman 55', 66'	Report	Msipa 90+1'	Stadium: Itaipava Arena Fonte Nova; Attendance: 5,115; Referee: Esther Staubli (Switzerland)

12 August 2016 2016 Summer Olympics QF	Brazil	0–0 (a.e.t.) (7–6 p)	Australia	Belo Horizonte, Brazil
22:00 BRT		Report		Stadium: Mineirão; Attendance: 52,660; Referee: Carol Chenard (Canada)
	Penalties
	Andressa Alves (penalty scored); Andressa (penalty scored); Beatriz (penalty scored); Rafaelle (penalty scored); Marta (penalty missed); Debinha (penalty scored); Monica (penalty scored); Tamires (penalty scored)		(penalty scored) Kellond-Knight; (penalty scored) Alleway; (penalty scored) van Egmond; (penalty scored) Polkinghorne; (penalty missed) Gorry; (penalty scored) Heyman; (penalty scored) Logarzo; (penalty missed) Kennedy

=== 2017 ===
1 March 2017 2017 Algarve Cup Group stage	Australia	0–1	Sweden	Albufeira, Portugal
18:30 (WET)		Report	Schelin 60'	Stadium: Albufeira Municipal Stadium; Referee: Yoshimi Yamashita (Japan)

3 March 2017 2017 Algarve Cup Group stage	Australia	3–2	Netherlands	Vila Real de Santo António, Portugal
15:00 (WET)	Gielnik 16', 31'; Kennedy 45'	Report	Miedema 75'; Spitse 79'	Stadium: VRS António Sports Complex; Referee: Salima Mukansanga (Rwanda)

6 March 2017 2017 Algarve Cup Group stage	China	1–2	Australia	Albufeira, Portugal
15:00 (WET)	Sha. Wang 36'	Report	Gielnik 61'; Carpenter 84'	Stadium: Albufeira Municipal Stadium; Referee: Riem Hussein (Germany)

8 March 2017 2017 Algarve Cup 3rd place match	Australia	1–1 (1–4 p)	Denmark	Albufeira, Portugal
14:45 (WET)	K. Simon 36'	Report	Harder 80'	Stadium: Albufeira Municipal Stadium; Referee: Ekaterina Koroleva (United States)
	Penalties
	Kellond-Knight (penalty scored); Polkinghorne (penalty missed); Kerr (penalty missed)		(penalty scored) Røddik Hansen; (penalty scored) Petersen; (penalty scored) Larsen; (penalty scored) Troelsgaard

27 July 2017 2017 Tournament of Nations	United States	0–1	Australia	Seattle, United States
19:00 (PDT)		Report	Butt 67'	Stadium: CenturyLink Field; Attendance: 15,748; Referee: Marie-Soleil Beaudoin (Canada)

30 July 2017 2017 Tournament of Nations	Japan	2–4	Australia	San Diego, United States
14:15 (PDT)	Tanaka 5'; Momiki 90+2'	Report	Kerr 10', 14', 43'; van Egmond 62' (pen.)	Stadium: Qualcomm Stadium; Attendance: 9,597; Referee: Katja Koroleva (United States)

3 August 2017 2017 Tournament of Nations	Australia	6–1	Brazil	Carson, United States
16:15 (PDT)	De Vanna 7', 34'; Foord 32', 68'; Gorry 41'; Kerr 81'	Report	Camila 2'	Stadium: StubHub Center; Attendance: 11,948; Referee: Christina Unkel (United States)

16 September 2017 Friendly	Australia	2–1	Brazil	Sydney, Australia
15:00 (AEST)	De Vanna 41'; Kerr 67'	Report	Debinha 79'	Stadium: Pepper Stadium; Attendance: 15,089; Referee: Anna-Marie Keighley (New Zealand)

19 September 2017 Friendly	Australia	3–2	Brazil	Newcastle, Australia
19:30 (AEST)	Kerr 37', 65'; Foord 46'	Report	Fabiana 1'; Marta 86' (pen.)	Stadium: McDonald Jones Stadium; Attendance: 16,829; Referee: Lara Lee (Australia)

22 November 2017 Friendly	Australia	3–0	China	Melbourne, Australia
19:30 (AEDT)	Kerr 23', 64'; Butt 53'	Report		Stadium: AAMI Park; Attendance: 10,904; Referee: Esther Staubli (Switzerland)

26 November 2017 Friendly	Australia	5–1	China	Geelong, Australia
16:30 (AEDT)	Simon 14'; Li 25' (o.g.); Kerr 37', 58'; Logarzo 68'	Report	Ren 7'	Stadium: GMHBA Stadium; Attendance: 6,338; Referee: Sandra Strub (Switzerland)

=== 2018 ===
28 February 2018 2018 Algarve Cup Group stage	Australia	4–3	Norway	Albufeira, Portugal
18:30 WET	Polkinghorne 13'; Logarzo 24'; Kerr 31'; Crummer 90+5'	Report	Thorsnes 11', 61' (pen.); Ultand 52'	Stadium: Albufeira Municipal Stadium; Referee: Monika Mularczyk (Poland)

2 March 2018 2018 Algarve Cup Group stage	Portugal	0–0	Australia	Algarve, Portugal
15:00 WET		Report		Stadium: Estádio Algarve; Referee: Jonesia Kabakama (Tanzania)

5 March 2018 2018 Algarve Cup Group stage	Australia	2–0	China	Albufeira, Portugal
19:00 WET	Logarzo 51'; Kerr 90+2'	Report		Stadium: Albufeira Municipal Stadium; Referee: Laura Fortunato (Argentina)

7 March 2018 2018 Algarve Cup 3rd place match	Australia	1–2	Portugal	Albufeira, Portugal
15:00 WET	Cooper 45+2'	Report	Gomes 38'; Malho 56'	Stadium: Albufeira Municipal Stadium; Referee: Ekaterina Koroleva (United States)

26 March 2018 Friendly	Australia	5–0	Thailand	Perth, Australia
18:00 AWST	Chidiac 6'; De Vanna 42', 52'; Logarzo 44'; Crummer 75'	Report		Stadium: nib Stadium; Attendance: 7,549

7 April 2018 2018 AFC Women's Asian Cup GS	Australia	0–0	South Korea	Amman, Jordan
20:00 (EEST)		Report; Report (AFC)		Stadium: King Abdullah II Stadium; Attendance: 230; Referee: Qin Liang (China)

10 April 2018 2018 AFC Women's Asian Cup GS	Vietnam	0–8	Australia	Amman, Jordan
20:00 (EEST)		Report; Report (AFC)	Simon 8'; Kennedy 18'; Logarzo 21'; van Egmond 28'; Kerr 44', 51'; Tuyết Dung 71' (o.g.); Raso 75'	Stadium: Amman International Stadium; Attendance: 401; Referee: Edita Mirabidova (Uzbekistan)

13 April 2018 2018 AFC Women's Asian Cup GS	Japan	1–1	Australia	Amman, Jordan
16:45 (EEST)	Sakaguchi 63'	Report; Report (AFC)	Kerr 86'	Stadium: Amman International Stadium; Referee: Ri Hyang-ok (North Korea)

17 April 2018 2018 AFC Women's Asian Cup SF	Australia	2–2 (a.e.t.) (3–1 p)	Thailand	Amman, Jordan
16:45 (EEST)	Kanjanaporn 17' (o.g.); Kennedy 90+1'	Report; Report (AFC)	Kanjana 20'; Rattikan 63'	Stadium: King Abdullah II Stadium; Attendance: 166; Referee: Edita Mirabidova (Uzbekistan)
	Penalties
	van Egmond (penalty missed); Kellond-Knight (penalty scored); De Vanna (penalty missed); Catley (penalty scored); Kerr (penalty scored)		(penalty scored) Ainon; (penalty missed) Sunisa; (penalty missed) Silawan; (penalty missed) Pitsamai

20 April 2018 2018 AFC Women's Asian Cup Final	Japan	1–0	Australia	Amman, Jordan
18:00 (EEST)	Yokoyama 84'	Report; Report (AFC)		Stadium: Amman International Stadium; Attendance: 3,065; Referee: Ri Hyang-ok (North Korea)

26 July 2018 2018 Tournament of Nations	Brazil	1–3	Australia	Kansas City, United States
15:15 (CDT)	Debinha 79'	Report	Poliana 9' (o.g.); Butt 39'; Kerr 50'	Stadium: Children's Mercy Park; Attendance: 10,307; Referee: Christina Unkel (United States)

29 July 2018 2018 Tournament of Nations	United States	1–1	Australia	East Hartford, United States
19:00 (EDT)	Horan 90'	Report	Logarzo 22'	Stadium: Pratt & Whitney Stadium; Attendance: 21,570; Referee: Miriam León (El Salvador)

2 August 2018 2018 Tournament of Nations	Australia	2–0	Japan	Bridgeview, United States
16:45 (CDT)	Kennedy 47'; Kerr 81'	Report		Stadium: Toyota Park; Attendance: 11,922; Referee: Katja Koroleva (United States)

5 October 2018 Friendly	France	2–0	Australia	Saint-Étienne, France
21:00 CEST	Le Sommer 56', 90'	Report		Stadium: Stade Geoffroy-Guichard; Attendance: 10,815; Referee: Ivana Martinčić (Croatia)

9 October 2018 Friendly	England	1–1	Australia	London, England
19:00 BST	Kirby 21'	Report	Polkinghorne 84'	Stadium: Craven Cottage; Referee: Florence Guillemin (France)

10 November 2018 Seven Consulting International Series	Australia	2–3	Chile	Sydney, Australia
15:30 AEDT	van Egmond 9' (pen.), 90+4' (pen.)	Report	Lara 20'; Guerrero 48'; Huenteo 90'	Stadium: Penrith Stadium; Attendance: 15,185; Referee: Rebecca Durcau (Australia)

13 November 2018 Seven Consulting International Series	Australia	5–0	Chile	Newcastle, Australia
19:30 AEDT	Kerr 52'; Foord 54', 67', 88'; Gielnik 69'	Report		Stadium: McDonald Jones Stadium; Attendance: 12,649; Referee: Kim Yu-jeong (South Korea)

=== 2019 ===
28 February 2019 Cup of Nations	Australia	2–0	New Zealand	Sydney, Australia
19:30 AEDT	Gielnik 44'; Raso 75'	Report; Summary		Stadium: Leichhardt Oval; Attendance: 6,805; Referee: Fusako Kajiyama (Japan)

3 March 2019 Cup of Nations	Australia	4–1	South Korea	Brisbane, Australia
18:00 AEST	Kerr 6' (pen.), 45+1'; De Vanna 36'; Gielnik 81'	Report; Summary	Ji So-yun 12'	Stadium: Suncorp Stadium; Attendance: 10,520

6 March 2019 Cup of Nations	Australia	3–0	Argentina	Melbourne, Australia
18:00 AEDT	Kerr 4'; Kennedy 33'; Foord 90+4' (pen.)	Report; Summary		Stadium: AAMI Park; Attendance: 6,834; Referee: Fusako Kajiyama (Japan)

4 April 2019 Friendly	United States	5–3	Australia	Commerce City, United States
19:00 (MDT)	Morgan 14'; Heath 53'; Rapinoe 61'; Pugh 67', 90+5'	Report	De Vanna 29'; Foord 47'; Kerr 81'	Stadium: Dick's Sporting Goods Park; Attendance: 17,264; Referee: Karen Abt (United States)

1 June 2019 Friendly	Netherlands	3–0	Australia	Eindhoven, Netherlands
18:15 CEST	van de Sanden 45+1', 70'; Miedema 49'	Report		Stadium: Philips Stadion

3 June 2019 Training Match	Netherlands B	3–1	Australia B	Netherlands
CEST		Report		Attendance: 0 (behind closed doors)

9 June 2019 FIFA Women's World Cup GS	Australia	1–2	Italy	Valenciennes, France
13:00 CEST	Kerr 22'	Report	Bonansea 56', 90+5'	Stadium: Stade du Hainaut; Attendance: 15,380; Referee: Melissa Borjas (Honduras)

13 June 2019 FIFA Women's World Cup GS	Australia	3–2	Brazil	Montpellier, France
18:00 CEST	Foord 45+1'; Logarzo 58'; Mônica 66' (o.g.)	Report	Marta 27' (pen.); Cristiane 38'	Stadium: Stade de la Mosson; Attendance: 17,032; Referee: Esther Staubli (Switzerland)

18 June 2019 FIFA Women's World Cup GS	Jamaica	1–4	Australia	Grenoble, France
21:00 CEST	Solaun 49'	Report	Kerr 11', 42', 69', 83'	Stadium: Stade des Alpes; Attendance: 17,402; Referee: Katalin Kulcsár (Hungary)

22 June 2019 FIFA Women's World Cup R16	Norway	1–1 (a.e.t.) (4–1 p)	Australia	Nice, France
21:00 CEST	Herlovsen 31'	Report	Kellond-Knight 83'	Stadium: Allianz Riviera; Attendance: 12,229; Referee: Riem Hussein (Germany)
	Penalties
	C. Hansen (penalty scored); Reiten (penalty scored); Mjelde (penalty scored); Ingrid Engen (penalty scored)		(penalty missed) Kerr; (penalty missed) Gielnik; (penalty scored) Catley

9 November 2019 Friendly	Australia	2–1	Chile	Sydney, Australia
15:00 AEDT	Kerr 3', 72'	Report	Sáez 89'	Stadium: Bankwest Stadium; Attendance: 20,029; Referee: Rebecca Durcau (Australia)

12 November 2019 Friendly	Australia	1–0	Chile	Adelaide, Australia
19:30 ACDT	Gielnik 23'	Report		Stadium: Coopers Stadium; Attendance: 10,340; Referee: Anna-Marie Keighley (New Zealand)

== See also ==
- Australia women's national soccer team results (1975–1999)
- Australia women's national soccer team results (2000–2009)
- Australia women's national soccer team results (2020–present)
