= Amy Duggan =

Australian soccer player and media personality

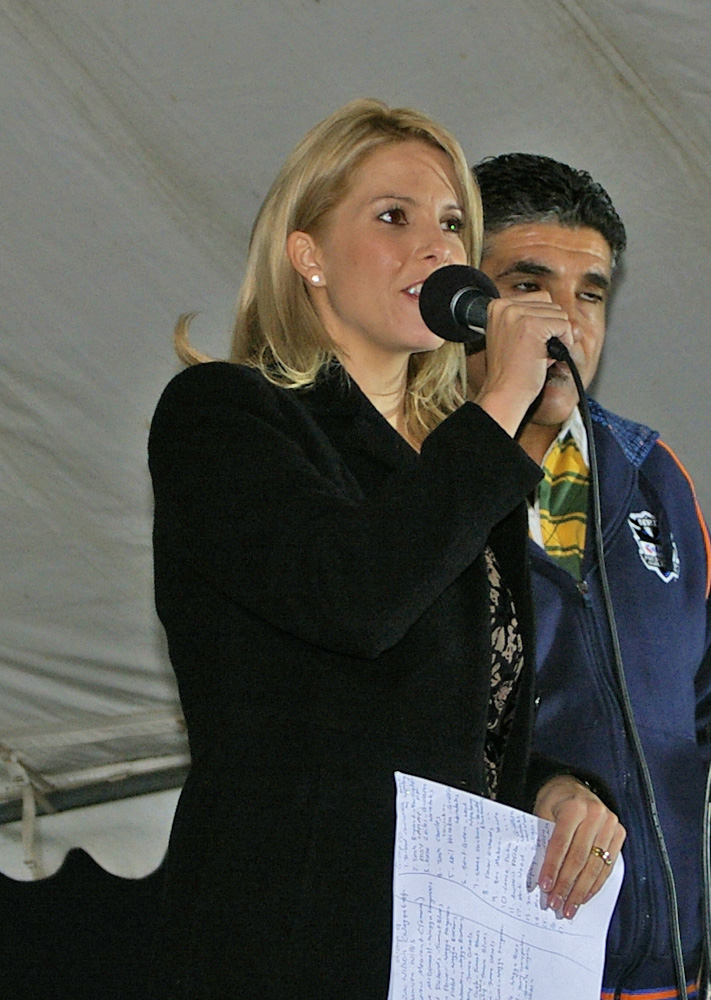
- Amy Duggan in 2008

Personal information
- Full name: Amy Elizabeth Duggan
- Birth name: Amy Elizabeth Taylor
- Date of birth: 11 June 1979 (age 47)
- Place of birth: Canberra, Australia
- Height: 1.65 m (5 ft 5 in)
- Position: Defender

Senior career*
Years	Team	Apps	(Gls)
- Tuggeranong United FC
- Canberra City FC
- Canberra Eclipse
- Canberra Olympic FC
- Hampton Roads Piranhas

International career
1997–2005	Australia	27	(3)
- * Club domestic league appearances and goals

Amy Elizabeth Duggan (née Taylor; born 11 June 1979) is an Australian retired soccer player and media personality.

== Football career ==
Amy Taylor was born in Canberra, Australia, and grew up in Tuggeranong. She started playing soccer at Tuggeranong United FC. At club level, she played nearly 100 games for the Canberra Eclipse in the now defunct Australian Women's National Soccer League, and played professionally for Hampton Roads Piranhas in the USL W-League.

She was a member of the Australia women's national soccer team, known as "The Matildas", playing as a defender in over thirty international matches. She was first selected to the Australian women's national team in 1997, at the age of 17—just six years after she began playing the sport. That same year she was called up for the 1997 Women's U.S. Cup to replace injured defender Bridgette Starr, scoring her first international goal as the Matildas lost 9–1 to the United States. Taylor was an unused substitute during the 1999 FIFA Women's World Cup, and that same year she appeared on the cover of nude calendar featuring current Matilda's players, designed to lift the profile of the women's game and raise funds to support the national team's activities. She wound up cut out of the Australian team for the 2000 Summer Olympics.

After one year away from international soccer, Taylor returned to the Matildas in 2004 to take part in the Olympic qualifiers. She was again an alternate player for the 2004 Olympics tournament.

Known as a determined defender and combative tackler, Taylor succumbed to a number of ankle injuries and underwent two reconstructive surgeries. She retired from international football in 2005 to take on a career in the media full time.

== 2000 Matildas Calendar and Magazine Appearances ==
In 1999–2000, she starred nude in the Matildas Football Calendar She also starred in a bikini in several Inside Sport magazines including as covergirl of the August 2000 Inside Sport magazine.

Amy Taylor also starred in the March 2001 Issue of the Australian Ralph Magazine. She also received an offer to star naked in Zoo Weekly (magazine).

== Media career ==
Her appearance on the Matilda's calendar led to appearances in various magazines and print ads as a model. She joined WIN Television in Australia as a presenter on a fishing program called Fishing Australia. She became the sports presenter for WIN News, becoming one of WIN's most popular personalities.

In 2008, Duggan co-hosted the first series of football-reality television program Football Superstar on pay TV channel FOX8. For the second series in 2009, she was replaced by Lee Furlong after the birth of her first child.

While continuing her role on WIN News, she has also hosted and commentated for ABC's telecast of the W-League national women's competition. Then went on to Host W-League and Matilda's matches for Fox Sports from 2015 to 2018 before signing with Optus Sport in 2019 for the 2019 Women's World Cup.

From August 2016, Amy started hosting a four-hour weekly music program on Wollongong's i98FM, called Chilled Sundays.

Amy Duggan began presenting on Wollongong radio station ABC Illawarra on Friday mornings starting on 13 October 2023.
