= Lisa Casagrande =

Australian retired footballer

Personal information
- Full name: Lisa Maree Casagrande
- Date of birth: 29 May 1978 (age 48)
- Place of birth: Lismore, New South Wales, Australia
- Height: 1.56 m (5 ft 1 in)
- Position: Midfielder

College career
Years	Team	Apps	(Gls)
1999–2001	Portland Pilots		

Senior career*
Years	Team	Apps	(Gls)
1995–1996	Goonellabah F.C.		
1996–1997	Northern NSW Pride		
1997–1999	Canberra Eclipse		

International career
1994–2000	Australia	64	(13)
- * Club domestic league appearances and goals

Lisa Maree Casagrande (born 29 May 1978) is an Australian retired footballer. She played at the FIFA Women's World Cup in 1995 (scoring a goal) and 1999, and at the 2000 Olympic Games in Sydney.

== Club career ==
Casagrande played as a forward for the Goonellabah Football Club (1995-1996), the Northern NSW Pride (1996-1997) and the Canberra Eclipse (1997-1999).

== International career ==
Casagrande made her international debut at age 14 in a match against Japan. She represented the Australian team 64 times playing as a midfielder. She played at the 1995 FIFA Women's World Cup, scoring a goal against the United States in the qualification; at the 1999 FIFA Women's World Cup and the 2000 Summer Olympic Games in Sydney.

She competed at the University of Portland from 1999 to 2001, and retired at age 22. In 2013, the Football Federation Australia named her to its "Teams of the Decade" for 1990–1999. In 2015, she was inducted into the Football Federation Australia Hall of Fame.

== International goals ==
No.	Date	Venue	Opponent	Score	Result	Competition
1.	16 October 1994	Port Moresby, Papua New Guinea	Papua New Guinea	?–0	7–0	1994 OFC Women's Championship
2.	19 October 1994	Port Moresby, Papua New Guinea	Papua New Guinea	?–0	4–0	1994 OFC Women's Championship
3.	10 June 1995	Helsingborg, Sweden	United States	1–0	1–4	1995 FIFA Women's World Cup
4.	3 August 1995	Piscataway, United States	United States	?–?	2–4	1995 Women's U.S. Cup
5.	9 October 1998	Auckland, New Zealand	American Samoa	2–0	21–0	1998 OFC Women's Championship
6.	9 October 1998	Auckland, New Zealand	American Samoa	11–0	21–0	1998 OFC Women's Championship
7.	11 October 1998	Auckland, New Zealand	Papua New Guinea	4–0	8–0	1998 OFC Women's Championship
8.	17 October 1998	Auckland, New Zealand	New Zealand	3–0	3–1	1998 OFC Women's Championship
