= Mia Hamm =

American soccer player (born 1972)

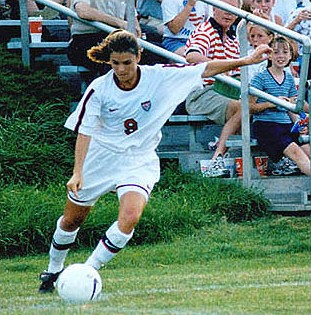
- Hamm playing for the United States in 1995

Personal information
- Full name: Mariel Margaret Hamm
- Date of birth: March 17, 1972 (age 54)
- Place of birth: Selma, Alabama, U.S.
- Height: 5 ft 5 in (1.65 m)
- Positions: Forward; midfielder

Youth career
- 1988: Braddock Road Shooting Stars
- 1989: Lake Braddock Bruins

College career
Years	Team	Apps	(Gls)
1989–1993	North Carolina Tar Heels	95	(103)

Senior career*
Years	Team	Apps	(Gls)
2001–2003	Washington Freedom	49	(28)

International career^{‡}
1987–2004	United States	276	(158)
Medal record
Women's soccer
Representing United States
FIFA Women's World Cup
Winner	1991 China
Winner	1999 United States
Bronze medal – third place	1995 Sweden
Bronze medal – third place	2003 United States
Olympic Games
Gold medal – first place	1996 Atlanta	Team
Gold medal – first place	2004 Athens	Team
Silver medal – second place	2000 Sydney	Team
- * Club domestic league appearances and goals as of June 28, 2007 ‡ National team caps and goals as of June 29, 2007

Mariel Margaret "Mia" Hamm (born March 17, 1972) is an American former professional soccer player who played as a forward and midfielder for the United States national team from 1987 to 2004. She competed in four editions of the FIFA Women's World Cup, winning in 1991 and 1999. She won gold at the Olympic Games in 1996 and 2004, and won silver in 2000. She was a founding player of the Women's United Soccer Association (WUSA)—the first U.S. professional women's soccer league—where she played for the Washington Freedom from 2001 to 2003. She played college soccer for the North Carolina Tar Heels, helping the team win four NCAA Division I Championship titles. Hailed as a soccer icon, she is widely considered one of the best and most influential female players of all time. (Note: Attributed to multiple references:)

As of March 2026, Hamm ranks third on the list of most international goals scored, by players of any gender. She ranks fourth in U.S. national team appearances (276) and first in international assists (144). She was twice named FIFA World Player of the Year, was named U.S. Soccer Female Athlete of the Year five years in a row, and won six ESPY awards, including Best Soccer Player, Best Female Soccer Player and Female Athlete of the Year. The Women's Sports Foundation named her Sportswoman of the Year in 1997 and 1999.

Hamm was inducted into the National Soccer Hall of Fame, Alabama Sports Hall of Fame, Texas Sports Hall of Fame, and North Carolina Soccer Hall of Fame, and was the first woman inducted into the World Football Hall of Fame. In 2004, Hamm was chosen by Pelé as one of the 125 greatest living players.

Hamm is a co-owner of the professional soccer clubs Los Angeles FC and Angel City FC. She is a global ambassador for FC Barcelona and was on the board of directors of the Italian Serie A soccer club A.S. Roma from 2014 to 2020. She is the author of Go For the Goal: A Champion's Guide to Winning in Soccer and Life, and has been featured in several films and television shows, including the HBO documentary Dare to Dream: The Story of the U.S. Women's Soccer Team.

== Early life ==
Hamm was born on March 17, 1972, in Selma, Alabama to Bill and Stephanie Hamm. She is the fourth of six children. She wore corrective shoes as a toddler after being born with a club foot. Hamm spent her childhood on various U.S. Air Force bases around the world with her family. She first played soccer while living in Florence, Italy, and her entire family quickly became involved in the sport. At age five, Hamm joined her first soccer team in Wichita Falls, Texas. Her father coached Hamm and her newly adopted brother, 8-year-old Garrett. In junior high school, Hamm excelled as a football player on the boys' team. She attended Lake Braddock Secondary School in Burke, Virginia, and helped the Lake Braddock soccer team win the 1989 state championship.

== College career ==
From 1989 to 1993, Hamm attended the University of North Carolina at Chapel Hill, where she helped the Tar Heels win four NCAA Division I Championships in five years. She red-shirted the 1991 season to focus on preparation for the inaugural 1991 FIFA Women's World Cup in China. North Carolina lost one game of the 95 she played on the team. Hamm earned All-American honors, was named the Atlantic Coast Conference (ACC) Player of the Year for three consecutive years, and was named ACC Female Athlete of the Year in 1993 and 1994. She graduated from North Carolina in 1994 with the ACC records for goals (103), assists (72), and total points (278). In 2003, Hamm and Michael Jordan were named the greatest athletes of the ACC's first fifty years. Hamm was a member of the United States women's national college team that won a silver medal at the 1993 Summer Universiade in Buffalo, New York. The University of North Carolina retired Hamm's No.19 jersey in 1994.

== Club career ==
In 2001, Hamm was a founding player in the first professional women's soccer league in the United States, the Women's United Soccer Association (WUSA), and played for the Washington Freedom from 2001 to 2003. Throughout the league's history, Hamm was hailed as the star of the league and used heavily in marketing and promotion. In a poll of 1,000 advertising executives conducted in 2001, she was voted "the most appealing female athlete", garnering almost twice as many votes as the runner-up Anna Kournikova.

During the league's inaugural match between the Freedom and the Bay Area CyberRays at RFK Stadium in Washington, D.C., Hamm was fouled in the penalty area, which resulted in a penalty kick that her teammate Pretinha converted to mark the first goal scored in the league. The Freedom won 1–0. The 34,148 fans in attendance surpassed the turnout of every MLS game that weekend, while the television broadcast reached 393,087 households. Playing as a midfielder and forward, Hamm played in 19 of the Freedom's 21 matches during the 2001 season. She led the team in goals (6) and assists (4). The Freedom finished in seventh place during the regular season with a 6–12–3 record.

Hamm suffered a knee injury in November 2001 that kept her off the field for several months during early 2002. She played half of the 2002 season with the Freedom, scoring eight goals. The team finished the season in third place with a 11–5–5 record and advanced to the playoffs. After winning the semifinal against the Philadelphia Charge 1–0, the Freedom were defeated 3–2 by the Carolina Courage in the 2002 WUSA Founders Cup. Hamm scored once during the match.

During the 2003 season, Hamm started in 16 of the 19 games in which she played. Her 11 goals ranked second on the team behind Abby Wambach's 13, while her 11 assists ranked first. The Freedom finished the regular season in fourth place with a 9–8–4 record and secured a berth in the playoffs. The Freedom defeated the Atlanta Beat 2–1 in overtime to win the Founders Cup on August 24, 2003.

== International career ==
=== 1987–2004: Women's national team ===
Hamm made her debut for the United States women's national soccer team at the age of 15 at the 1987 U.S. Olympic Festival. (Note: Attributed to multiple references:) She did not score a goal during her first year, and scored her first goal during her 17th appearance. She competed in four FIFA Women's World Cup tournaments: the inaugural 1991 in China, 1995 in Sweden, 1999 and 2003 in the United States. She led the team at three Olympic Games, including: 1996 in Atlanta (the first time women's soccer was played), 2000 in Sydney, and 2004 in Athens. In total, she played 42 matches and scored 14 goals in international tournaments.

As of March 2026, Hamm ranks third on the list of most international goals scored, by players of any gender. She ranks third in the history of the U.S. national team for international caps (276) and first for career assists (144).

=== 1991 FIFA Women's World Cup ===
In 1991, Hamm was named to the roster for the inaugural FIFA Women's World Cup in China under North Carolina coach Anson Dorrance. At 19 years old, she was the youngest player on the squad. During the team's first match of the tournament, Hamm scored the game-winning goal as the U.S. achieved a 3–2 victory over Sweden. She also scored once in their second group stage match as they defeated Brazil 5–0. The U.S. eventually advanced to the final, where they defeated Norway 2–1 to win the World Cup.

=== 1995 FIFA Women's World Cup ===
Hamm's second World Cup appearance came during the 1995 tournament in Sweden. The U.S. were led by head coach Tony DiCicco.8888 During the first match of the tournament, Hamm scored the team's third goal in a 3–3 draw against China PR. During the second group stage match against Denmark, Hamm played the position of goalkeeper for a few minutes after Briana Scurry received a red card and was removed from the match. The U.S. was ultimately defeated in the semifinals by eventual champion Norway. Hamm's team achieved third place after defeating China PR 2–0 on June 17, with Hamm scoring one goal.

=== 1996–1998: Atlanta Olympics and 100th international goal ===
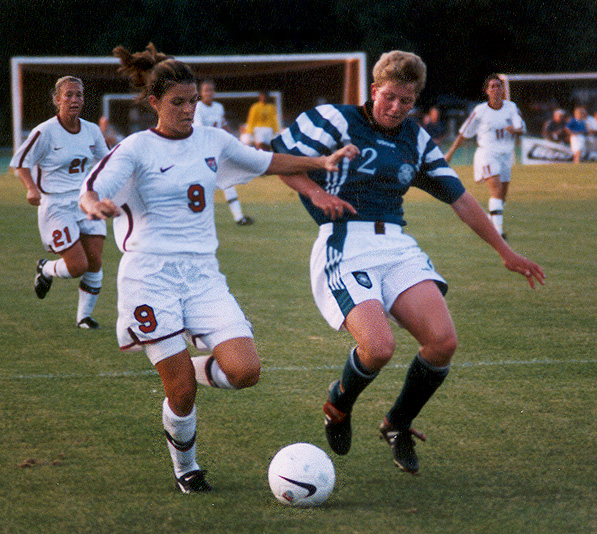
Hamm during a match against Germany, 1997

The 1996 Summer Olympic Games in Atlanta was the first Olympics to include women's soccer. Hamm scored a goal and served an assist as the U.S. defeated Denmark 3–0 in the first group stage match. After defeating Norway in the semifinals, the U.S. faced China in the final. Hamm played despite having foot and groin injuries, and was carried off on a stretcher in the final minute. (Note: Attributed to multiple references:) The U.S. achieved a 2–1 victory witnessed by 76,481 fans—the largest crowd for a soccer event in the history of the Olympics, and the largest crowd for a women's sports event in the United States. (Note: Attributed to multiple references:)

The 20 goals scored by Hamm in 1998 were the highest annual total of her international career. She also provided 20 assists. On September 18, she scored her 100th international goal in a friendly match against Russia in Rochester, New York. The same year, she led the U.S. to their first-ever gold medal at the Goodwill Games. Hamm scored five of the team's seven goals at the tournament, including two during the final match against China.

=== 1999: 108th International goal and FIFA Women's World Cup ===
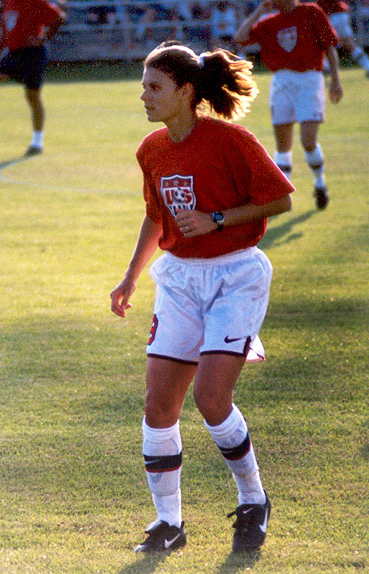
Hamm warming up before a match in 1998

On May 22, 1999, Hamm broke the all-time international goal record with her 108th goal in a game against Brazil in Orlando, Florida. The following month, she led the national team at the 1999 FIFA Women's World Cup, hosted by the United States. During a group stage match against Nigeria, Hamm scored one goal and served one assist as the U.S. won 7–1. (Note: Attributed to multiple references:) During the final group stage match, head coach Tony DiCicco rested Hamm, who was substituted at halftime. In the semifinal against Brazil, Hamm was knocked down in the penalty during the second half; Michelle Akers scored the resulting penalty kick as the U.S. won 2–0.

The World Cup Final was decided by a penalty shootout between the U.S. and China. All five American players to take penalty kicks converted, including Hamm; China missed one kick, resulting in a U.S. victory. The match surpassed the 1996 Atlanta Olympics final as the most-attended women's sports event in history, with more than 90,000 people filling the Rose Bowl in Pasadena, California. With 17,975,000 U.S. television viewers, it held the record for the largest U.S. television audience for a soccer match until 2014.

After the match, Hamm collapsed in the locker room from severe dehydration. She was treated by medical staff with an intravenous drip and three liters of fluids. After 12 hours of sleep, she joined the team for magazine cover shoots, went to Disneyland for a celebration rally, and made numerous television appearances. A week later, the team met US president Bill Clinton at the White House and flew with Hillary and Chelsea Clinton on Air Force One to Cape Canaveral. Hamm's leadership and performance at the 1999 World Cup cemented her as a soccer icon. (Note: Attributed to multiple references:)

=== 2000 Sydney Olympics ===
Hamm represented the U.S. at the 2000 Summer Olympics in Sydney, Australia. During the group stage of the tournament, she scored a goal as the U.S. defeated Norway 2–0. In the semifinal against Brazil, Hamm's game-winning goal marked the 127th of her international career and set a record for the most international goals scored by a player of any gender. The U.S. faced Norway in the final and were defeated 3–2 in overtime, earning the silver medal.

=== 2003 FIFA Women's World Cup ===
"Take your victories, whatever they may be, cherish them, use them, but don't settle for them. There are always new, grander challenges to confront, and a true winner will embrace each one."

— Mia Hamm

In August 2003, Hamm was named to the U.S. roster for the 2003 FIFA Women's World Cup, which was moved from China to the United States due to the SARS outbreak. She stated it would be her final World Cup appearance. During the team's first group stage match, Hamm's three assists helped the U.S. to a 3–1 win over Sweden. She contributed two goals and an assist in the second match against Nigeria, leading the U.S. to a 5–0 win and qualification for the quarterfinals. Coach April Heinrichs rested Hamm for the following game against North Korea, which the U.S. won 3–0; this was the first World Cup match Hamm had missed in her career. The U.S. achieved a 1–0 victory over Norway in the quarterfinal; Hamm was fouled multiple times throughout the match. The U.S. was defeated 3–0 by Germany in the semifinals, but achieved a 3–1 win over Canada to secure a third-place finish.

=== 2004: Athens Olympics and retirement ===
On May 14, 2004, Hamm announced that she would retire after the 2004 Summer Olympics in Athens. During the Olympic tournament, Hamm scored twice during her team's first group stage match against Greece as the U.S. won 3–0. Hamm scored once during the next match, a 2–0 win over Brazil. In the semifinal against Germany, Hamm served an assist to Heather O'Reilly, who scored to secure a 2–1 win. The U.S. faced Brazil for a second time in the gold medal match and won 2–1 in overtime. The game marked the last Olympic appearance for five players who had helped win the inaugural 1991 Women's World Cup: Hamm, Julie Foudy, Joy Fawcett, Brandi Chastain, and Kristine Lilly (often referred to as the Fab Five). Hamm was selected to carry the American flag at the closing ceremony of the Olympics.

Following the Olympics, Hamm and her teammates played in a 10-game farewell tour in the United States. (Note: Attributed to multiple references:) During the tour, Hamm scored her 158th international goal, setting the record for most international goals scored by a player of any gender. She held the record until Abby Wambach scored her 159th goal in 2013. The final match of the tour against Mexico in Carson, California, on December 8, marked the final international match for Hamm, Julie Foudy, and Joy Fawcett. The three players were honored in a pre-game ceremony and were presented with framed jerseys and roses. The U.S. defeated Mexico 5–0 with Hamm assisting on two of the goals. Hamm's No.9 jersey was inherited by midfielder Heather O'Reilly.

== Style of play ==
Regarded as one of the greatest female soccer players of all time, (Note: Attributed to multiple references:) Hamm was a technically gifted striker, known for her speed, footwork, stamina, and consistency. (Note: Attributed to multiple references:) An agile dribbler, she was highly regarded for her control, pace, and elegance in possession. (Note: Attributed to multiple references:) As a prolific goalscorer, Hamm was known for her powerful and accurate striking ability. She was also a creative and hard-working forward and team player, capable of assisting many goals with her accurate passing. She was able to aid her teammates defensively when possession was lost. (Note: Attributed to multiple references:)

== Endorsements ==
Hamm has been called the most marketable female athlete of her generation. During her time as an international soccer player, she signed endorsement deals with Gatorade, Nike, Dreyer's Ice Cream, Pepsi, Nabisco, Fleet Bank, Earthgrains, and Powerbar. (Note: Attributed to multiple references:) In 1997, she starred in a commercial for Pert Plus. Hamm was featured on a Wheaties box following the 1999 World Cup and endorsed the first Soccer Barbie by Mattel. She co-starred with Michael Jordan in a commercial for Gatorade in 1999, which featured the two athletes competing against each other in a variety of sports. (Note: Attributed to multiple references:)

== Other activities ==
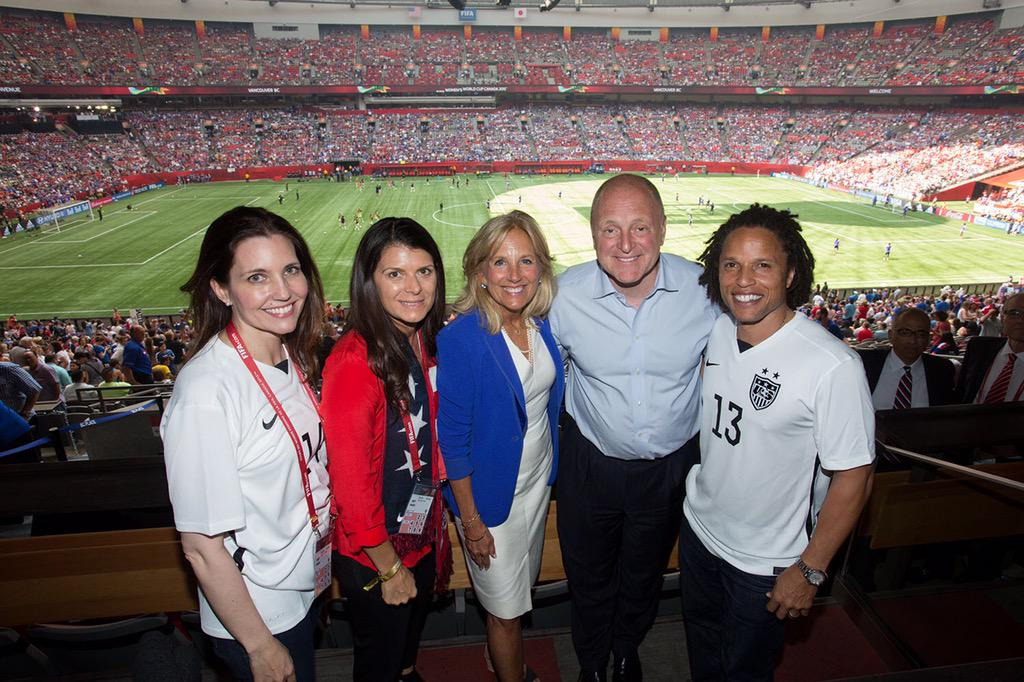
Hamm (second from left), with members of the United States delegation at the 2015 FIFA Women's World Cup Final in Vancouver, Canada

In 1997, Hamm's adopted brother Garrett died from complications of aplastic anemia, a rare blood disease. In 1999, Hamm founded the Mia Hamm Foundation, which raises awareness of the disease and raises funds for people in need of bone marrow or cord blood transplants. (Note: Attributed to multiple references:) The foundation encourages people to register in the national bone marrow registry and provides funding to UNC Health Care and Children's Hospital Los Angeles. It also focuses on creating opportunities for girls and women in sports. Hamm hosts an annual celebrity soccer game in Los Angeles to support the foundation.

In 2012, after Pia Sundhage's departure as head coach of the U.S. national team, Hamm joined Danielle Slaton and Sunil Gulati on the search committee for Sundhage's successor. In 2014, Hamm was named to the board of the National Soccer Hall of Fame.

In October 2014, Hamm was announced as a co-owner of the future Major League Soccer team, Los Angeles FC. The same month, she joined the board of directors of the Italian Serie A soccer club A.S. Roma, and served until 2020. She joined Vice President Joe Biden and Second Lady Jill Biden as members of the U.S. delegation to the 2015 FIFA Women's World Cup Final in Vancouver, Canada. In 2023, when asked if she would ever consider coaching the U.S. women's national team, Hamm said she lacks the patience and "bandwidth" for the job.

Hamm is the author of Go For the Goal: A Champion's Guide to Winning in Soccer and Life, and the juvenile fiction book Winners Never Quit. She is a global ambassador for FC Barcelona.

== In popular culture ==
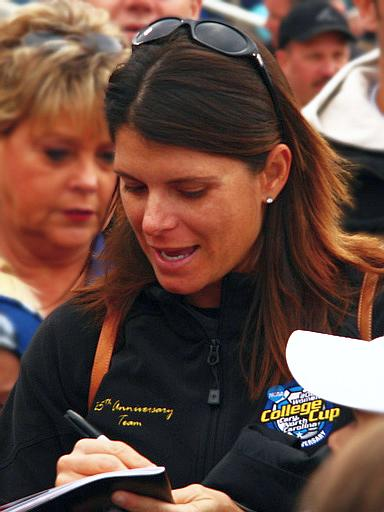
Hamm signing an autograph in 2006

Hamm has been featured on the covers of Sports Illustrated and People. She has made appearances on numerous television shows, including Late Night with David Letterman, The Rosie O'Donnell Show, The Tonight Show with Jay Leno, Today, Good Morning America, and The Oprah Winfrey Show. She was profiled in ESPN's SportsCentury and Biography documentaries and ESPN 25: Who's #1?. She was also featured in the documentaries Dare to Dream: The Story of the U.S. Women's Soccer Team (2005), and in Once in a Lifetime: The Extraordinary Story of the New York Cosmos (2006). (Note: Attributed to multiple references:) Her likeness was used in the logo of Women's Professional Soccer, the second women's professional soccer league in the United States. In 1999, Nike named a building on their corporate campus after Hamm.

In 2000, the video game Mia Hamm Soccer 64 was released for Nintendo 64. It was the first game to feature only female players, and sold 42,886 copies in the United States. In 2023, Hamm appeared in the video game EA Sports FC 24.

== Personal life ==
Hamm was first married to her college sweetheart Christian Corry, a United States Marine Corps helicopter pilot; they divorced in 2001 after six years of marriage. (Note: Attributed to multiple references:) On November 22, 2003, she married Boston Red Sox shortstop Nomar Garciaparra in Goleta, California, in a ceremony attended by a few hundred guests. On March 27, 2007, Hamm gave birth to twin girls. The couple had a son in January 2012.

== Career statistics ==
=== International goals ===
Scores and results list the United States' goal tally first, score column indicates score after each Hamm goal.

List of international goals scored by Mia Hamm
No.	Date	Venue	Opponent	Score	Result	Competition	Ref.
1	July 25, 1990	Winnipeg, Canada	Norway	4–0	4–0	Friendly	
2	July 27, 1990	Winnipeg, Canada	Canada	3–?	4–1	Friendly	
3	August 5, 1990	Blaine, United States	Soviet Union	3–0	8–0	Friendly	
4	August 5, 1990	Blaine, United States	Soviet Union	?–0	8–0	Friendly	
5	April 2, 1991	Varna, Bulgaria	Bulgaria	2–0	3–0	Friendly	
6	April 18, 1991	Port-au-Prince, Haiti	Mexico	1–0	12–0	1991 CONCACAF Women's Championship	
7	April 20, 1991	Port-au-Prince, Haiti	Martinique	?–0	12–0	1991 CONCACAF Women's Championship	
8	April 20, 1991	Port-au-Prince, Haiti	Martinique	?–0	12–0	1991 CONCACAF Women's Championship	
9	April 22, 1991	Port-au-Prince, Haiti	Trinidad and Tobago	?–0	10–0	1991 CONCACAF Women's Championship	
10	April 22, 1991	Port-au-Prince, Haiti	Trinidad and Tobago	?–0	10–0	1991 CONCACAF Women's Championship	
11	May 28, 1991	Vianen, Netherlands	Netherlands	2–?	3–4	Friendly	
12	August 8, 1991	Yanji, China	China	2–?	2–2	Friendly	
13	November 17, 1991	Guangzhou, China	Sweden	3–0	3–2	1991 FIFA Women's World Cup	
14	November 19, 1991	Guangzhou, China	Brazil	5–0	5–0	1991 FIFA Women's World Cup	
15	August 14, 1992	Medford, United States	Norway	1–0	1–3	Friendly	
16	March 11, 1993	Agia, Cyprus	Denmark	1–0	2–0	Friendly	
17	June 15, 1993	Mansfield, United States	Italy	?–0	5–0	Friendly	
18	June 15, 1993	Mansfield, United States	Italy	?–0	5–0	Friendly	
19	June 19, 1993	Columbus, United States	Italy	1–0	1–0	Friendly	
20	July 7, 1993	Hamilton, Canada	Australia	?–0	6–0	Friendly	
21	July 7, 1993	Hamilton, Canada	Australia	?–0	6–0	Friendly	
22	July 7, 1993	Hamilton, Canada	Australia	?–0	6–0	Friendly	
23	July 10, 1993	Hamilton, Canada	Japan	?–0	7–0	Friendly	
24	July 10, 1993	Hamilton, Canada	Japan	?–0	7–0	Friendly	
25	July 12, 1993	Hamilton, Canada	Chinese Taipei	?–0	3–1	Friendly	
26	March 18, 1994	Vila Real de Santo António, Portugal	Sweden	1–0	1–0	1994 Algarve Cup	
27	July 31, 1994	Fairfax, United States	Germany	1–0	2–1	Friendly	
28	August 7, 1994	Worcester, United States	Norway	1–0	4–1	Friendly	
29	August 7, 1994	Worcester, United States	Norway	?–?	4–1	Friendly	
30	August 13, 1994	Montreal, Canada	Mexico	?–0	9–0	1994 CONCACAF Women's Championship	
31	August 17, 1994	Montreal, Canada	Trinidad and Tobago	1–0	11–1	1994 CONCACAF Women's Championship	
32	August 17, 1994	Montreal, Canada	Trinidad and Tobago	?–0	11–1	1994 CONCACAF Women's Championship	
33	August 17, 1994	Montreal, Canada	Trinidad and Tobago	?–0	11–1	1994 CONCACAF Women's Championship	
34	August 17, 1994	Montreal, Canada	Trinidad and Tobago	?–?	11–1	1994 CONCACAF Women's Championship	
35	August 21, 1994	Montreal, Canada	Canada	1–0	6–0	1994 CONCACAF Women's Championship	
36	February 24, 1995	Orlando, United States	Denmark	?–0	7–0	Friendly	
37	February 24, 1995	Orlando, United States	Denmark	?–0	7–0	Friendly	
38	March 14, 1995	Faro, Portugal	Finland	1–0	2–0	1995 Algarve Cup	
39	April 12, 1995	Saint-Maur-des-Fossés, France	Canada	1–0	5–0	Friendly	
40	April 12, 1995	Saint-Maur-des-Fossés, France	Canada	?–0	5–0	Friendly	
41	April 12, 1995	Saint-Maur-des-Fossés, France	Canada	?–0	5–0	Friendly	
42	April 15, 1995	Strasbourg, France	France	3–0	3–0	Friendly	
43	April 30, 1995	Davidson, United States	Finland	6–0	6–0	Friendly	
44	May 12, 1995	Tacoma, United States	Brazil	1–0	3–0	Friendly	
45	May 12, 1995	Tacoma, United States	Brazil	2–0	3–0	Friendly	
46	May 19, 1995	Dallas, United States	Canada	1–0	9–1	Friendly	
47	May 19, 1995	Dallas, United States	Canada	9–?	9–1	Friendly	
48	June 6, 1995	Gävle, Sweden	China	3–1	3–3	1995 FIFA Women's World Cup	
49	June 17, 1995	Gävle, Sweden	China	2–0	2–0	1995 FIFA Women's World Cup	
50	July 30, 1995	New Britain, United States	Chinese Taipei	2–0	9–0	1995 Women's U.S. Cup	
51	July 30, 1995	New Britain, United States	Chinese Taipei	4–0	9–0	1995 Women's U.S. Cup	
52	August 3, 1995	Piscataway, United States	Australia	?–?	4–2	1995 Women's U.S. Cup	
53	August 3, 1995	Piscataway, United States	Australia	?–?	4–2	1995 Women's U.S. Cup	
54	August 6, 1995	Washington, D.C., United States	Norway	1–1	2–1	1995 Women's U.S. Cup	
55	January 16, 1996	Campinas, Brazil	Brazil	1–0	3–2	Friendly	
56	February 2, 1996	Tampa, United States	Norway	1–0	3–2	Friendly	
57	February 15, 1996	San Antonio, United States	Sweden	3–0	3–0	Friendly	
58	March 14, 1996	Decatur, United States	Germany	5–0	6–0	Friendly	
59	April 28, 1996	Indianapolis, United States	France	1–0	8–2	Friendly	
60	April 28, 1996	Indianapolis, United States	France	3–0	8–2	Friendly	
61	April 28, 1996	Indianapolis, United States	France	5–0	8–2	Friendly	
62	April 28, 1996	Indianapolis, United States	France	7–0	8–2	Friendly	
63	July 21, 1996	Orlando, United States	Denmark	2–0	3–0	1996 Summer Olympics	
64	February 28, 1997	Melbourne, Australia	Australia	4–0	4–0	Friendly	
65	May 2, 1997	Milwaukee, United States	South Korea	1–0	7–0	Friendly	
66	May 2, 1997	Milwaukee, United States	South Korea	3–0	7–0	Friendly	
67	May 4, 1997	St. Charles, United States	South Korea	2–0	6–1	Friendly	
68	May 4, 1997	St. Charles, United States	South Korea	3–?	6–1	Friendly	
69	May 9, 1997	San Jose, United States	England	2–0	5–0	Friendly	
70	May 9, 1997	San Jose, United States	England	3–0	5–0	Friendly	
71	May 9, 1997	San Jose, United States	England	4–0	5–0	Friendly	
72	May 11, 1997	Portland, United States	England	1–0	6–0	Friendly	
73	May 31, 1997	New Brian, United States	Canada	2–0	4–0	1997 Women's U.S. Cup	
74	May 31, 1997	New Brian, United States	Canada	3–0	4–0	1997 Women's U.S. Cup	
75	May 31, 1997	New Brian, United States	Canada	4–0	4–0	1997 Women's U.S. Cup	
76	June 5, 1997	Ambler, United States	Australia	3–0	9–1	1997 Women's U.S. Cup	
77	June 5, 1997	Ambler, United States	Australia	4–0	9–1	1997 Women's U.S. Cup	
78	June 8, 1997	Washington, D.C., United States	Italy	2–0	2–0	1997 Women's U.S. Cup	
79	October 12, 1997	Salzgitter, Germany	Germany	1–0	3–0	Friendly	
80	October 12, 1997	Salzgitter, Germany	Germany	3–0	3–0	Friendly	
81	December 11, 1997	Taubaté, Brazil	Brazil	1–?	2–1	Friendly	
82	January 24, 1998	Guangzhou, China	Norway	2–0	3–0	1998 Four Nations Tournament	
83	March 17, 1998	Loulé, Portugal	China	1–?	4–1	1998 Algarve Cup	
84	March 17, 1998	Loulé, Portugal	China	2–?	4–1	1998 Algarve Cup	
85	March 17, 1998	Loulé, Portugal	China	4–?	4–1	1998 Algarve Cup	
86	April 24, 1998	Fullerton, United States	Argentina	6–1	8–1	Friendly	
87	April 24, 1998	Fullerton, United States	Argentina	8–1	8–1	Friendly	
88	May 8, 1998	Indianapolis, United States	Iceland	2–0	6–0	Friendly	
89	May 8, 1998	Indianapolis, United States	Iceland	3–0	6–0	Friendly	
90	June 28, 1998	Chicago, United States	Germany	2–0	4–2	Friendly	
91	June 28, 1998	Chicago, United States	Germany	3–0	4–2	Friendly	
92	June 28, 1998	Chicago, United States	Germany	4–1	4–2	Friendly	
93	July 25, 1998	Uniondale, United States	Denmark	3–0	5–0	1998 Goodwill Games	
94	July 25, 1998	Uniondale, United States	Denmark	4–0	5–0	1998 Goodwill Games	
95	July 25, 1998	Uniondale, United States	Denmark	5–0	5–0	1998 Goodwill Games	
96	July 27, 1998	Uniondale, United States	China	1–0	2–0	1998 Goodwill Games	
97	July 27, 1998	Uniondale, United States	China	2–0	2–0	1998 Goodwill Games	
98	September 12, 1998	Foxboro, United States	Mexico	1–0	9–0	1998 Women's U.S. Cup	
99	September 12, 1998	Foxboro, United States	Mexico	4–0	9–0	1998 Women's U.S. Cup	
100	September 18, 1998	Rochester, United States	Russia	3–0	4–0	1998 Women's U.S. Cup	
101	September 18, 1998	Rochester, United States	Russia	4–0	4–0	1998 Women's U.S. Cup	
102	January 27, 1999	Orlando, United States	Portugal	4–0	7–0	Friendly	
103	January 30, 1999	Fort Lauderdale, United States	Portugal	5–0	6–0	Friendly	
104	February 27, 1999	Tampa, United States	Finland	2–0	2–0	Friendly	
105	May 2, 1999	Atlanta, United States	Japan	2–0	7–0	Friendly	
106	May 13, 1999	Milwaukee, United States	Netherlands	4–0	5–0	Friendly	
107	May 16, 1999	Chicago, United States	Netherlands	2–0	3–0	Friendly	
108	May 22, 1999	Orlando, United States	Brazil	1–0	3–0	Friendly	
109	June 6, 1999	Portland, United States	Canada	1–1	4–2	Friendly	
110	June 19, 1999	East Rutherford, United States	Denmark	1–0	3–0	1999 FIFA Women's World Cup	
111	June 24, 1999	Chicago, United States	Nigeria	2–1	7–1	1999 FIFA Women's World Cup	
112	October 3, 1999	Columbus, United States	South Korea	2–0	5–0	Friendly	
113	October 10, 1999	Louisville, United States	Brazil	1–0	4–2	Friendly	
114	October 10, 1999	Louisville, United States	Brazil	3–2	4–2	Friendly	
115	February 6, 2000	Fort Lauderdale, United States	Norway	1–1	2–3	Friendly	
116	March 16, 2000	Lagos, Portugal	Sweden	1–0	1–0	2000 Algarve Cup	
117	April 5, 2000	Davidson, United States	Iceland	6–0	8–0	Friendly	
118	May 5, 2000	Portland, United States	Mexico	5–0	8–0	2000 Women's U.S. Cup	
119	June 23, 2000	Hershey, United States	Trinidad and Tobago	5–0	11–0	2000 CONCACAF Women's Championship	
120	June 23, 2000	Hershey, United States	Trinidad and Tobago	8–0	11–0	2000 CONCACAF Women's Championship	
121	July 1, 2000	Louisville, United States	Canada	4–1	4–1	2000 CONCACAF Women's Championship	
122	July 19, 2000	Göttingen, Germany	China	1–1	1–1	Friendly	
123	August 13, 2000	Annapolis, United States	Russia	4–1	7–1	Friendly	
124	September 1, 2000	San Jose, United States	Brazil	3–0	4–0	Friendly	
125	September 1, 2000	San Jose, United States	Brazil	4–0	4–0	Friendly	
126	September 14, 2000	Melbourne, Australia	Norway	2–0	2–0	2000 Summer Olympics	
127	September 24, 2000	Canberra, Australia	Brazil	1–0	1–0	2000 Summer Olympics	
128	September 9, 2001	Chicago, United States	Germany	3–1	4–1	2001 Women's U.S. Cup	
129	September 9, 2001	Chicago, United States	Germany	4–1	4–1	2001 Women's U.S. Cup	
130	July 21, 2002	Blaine, United States	Norway	4–0	4–0	Friendly	
131	September 8, 2002	Columbus, United States	Scotland	2–1	8–2	Friendly	
132	September 8, 2002	Columbus, United States	Scotland	4–2	8–2	Friendly	
133	September 8, 2002	Columbus, United States	Scotland	6–2	8–2	Friendly	
134	September 29, 2002	Uniondale, United States	Russia	3–0	5–1	2002 Women's U.S. Cup	
135	September 29, 2002	Uniondale, United States	Russia	4–0	5–1	2002 Women's U.S. Cup	
136	November 9, 2002	Pasadena, United States	Canada	2–1	2–1	2002 CONCACAF Women's Gold Cup	
137	February 16, 2003	Charleston, United States	Iceland	1–0	1–0	Friendly	
138	March 20, 2003	Loulé, Portugal	China	2–0	2–0	2003 Algarve Cup	
139	May 17, 2003	Birmingham, United States	England	1–0	6–0	Friendly	
140	June 14, 2003	Salt Lake City, United States	Republic of Ireland	5–0	5–0	Friendly	
141	September 1, 2003	Carson, United States	Costa Rica	5–0	5–0	Friendly	
142	September 7, 2003	San Jose, United States	Mexico	4–0	5–0	Friendly	
143	September 25, 2003	Philadelphia, United States	Nigeria	1–0	5–0	2003 FIFA Women's World Cup	
144	September 25, 2003	Philadelphia, United States	Nigeria	2–0	5–0	2003 FIFA Women's World Cup	
145	February 25, 2004	San José, Costa Rica	Trinidad and Tobago	4–0	7–0	2004 CONCACAF Women's Pre-Olympic Tournament	
146	February 25, 2004	San José, Costa Rica	Trinidad and Tobago	6–0	7–0	2004 CONCACAF Women's Pre-Olympic Tournament	
147	March 14, 2004	Ferreiras, Portugal	France	2–0	5–1	2004 Algarve Cup	
148	April 24, 2004	Birmingham, United States	Brazil	3–0	5–1	Friendly	
149	May 9, 2004	Albuquerque, United States	Mexico	2–0	3–0	Friendly	
150	July 21, 2004	Blaine, United States	Australia	2–1	3–1	Friendly	
151	August 1, 2004	Hartford, United States	China	2–0	3–1	Friendly	
152	August 11, 2004	Heraklio, Greece	Greece	3–0	3–0	2004 Summer Olympics	
153	August 14, 2004	Thessaloniki, Greece	Brazil	1–0	2–0	2004 Summer Olympics	
154	September 25, 2004	Rochester, United States	Iceland	3–0	4–3	Friendly	
155	October 3, 2004	Portland, United States	New Zealand	1–0	5–0	Friendly	
156	October 3, 2004	Portland, United States	New Zealand	2–0	5–0	Friendly	
157	October 10, 2004	Cincinnati, United States	New Zealand	1–0	5–0	Friendly	
158	November 3, 2004	East Rutherford, United States	Denmark	1–1	1–1	Friendly	

== Honors ==
=== University of North Carolina at Chapel Hill ===
- 4x NCAA National Champion: 1989, 1990, 1992, 1993
- 2x U.S. National Player of the Year: 1992, 1993
- 2x ACC Female Athlete of the Year: 1993, 1994
- 2x Honda Sports Award: 1993, 1994
- Honda-Broderick Cup: 1994
- 3x All-American
- 3x ACC Player of the Year

=== Washington Freedom ===
- WUSA Founder's Cup champion: 2003

=== United States ===
- 2x FIFA Women's World Cup champion: 1991, 1999
- 2x FIFA Women's World Cup third place: 1995, 2003
- 2x Olympic gold medalist: 1996, 2004
- Olympic silver medalist: 2000
- FIFA Women's World Player of the Year: 2001, 2002

=== Halls of Fame ===
- Alabama Sports Hall of Fame: 2006
- National Soccer Hall of Fame: 2007
- Texas Sports Hall of Fame: 2008
- World Football Hall of Fame: 2013
- National Women's Hall of Fame: 2021

=== Other honors ===
- 5x U.S. Female Soccer Player of the Year: 1994–1998
- 2x Women's Sports Foundation Sportswoman of the Year: 1997, 1999
- 2x ESPY Award for Best Female Athlete: 1998, 2000
- 3x ESPY Award for Best Soccer Player: 2000, 2001, 2005
- ESPY Award for Best Female Soccer Player: 2004
- FIFA 100: 2004
- Honorary Doctorate of Humanities, Princeton University: 2006
- ESPN Greatest Female Athlete: 2012
- USWNT All-Time Best XI: 2013
- Golden Foot Legends Award: 2014
- ESPNW Impact 25: 2014

== See also ==
- List of FIFA Women's World Cup winning players
- List of women's footballers with 100 or more international goals
- List of University of North Carolina at Chapel Hill Olympians
- List of Olympic medalists in football
- List of 1996 Summer Olympics medal winners
- List of 2000 Summer Olympics medal winners
- List of 2004 Summer Olympics medal winners
- List of athletes on Wheaties boxes

== Notes ==
Preceded by new creation	FIFA World Player of the Year; 2001, 2002	Succeeded by Birgit Prinz
