= Anissa Tann =

Australian soccer player and coach (born 1967)

Personal information
- Full name: Anissa Tann
- Date of birth: 10 October 1967 (age 59)
- Place of birth: Sydney
- Height: 1.73 m (5 ft 8 in)
- Position: Centre back

Senior career*
Years	Team	Apps	(Gls)
- Ramsgate RSL
- St George
- Melita Eagles
- Marconi Stallions
- Sutherland Sharks
- NSW Sapphires

International career^{‡}
1988–2002	Australia	102	(8)
- * Club domestic league appearances and goals as of 14:57, 12 January 2014 (UTC) ‡ National team caps and goals as of 14:57, 12 January 2014 (UTC)

Anissa Tann (born 10 October 1967) is an Australian soccer coach and former player. As a powerful defender, she represented Australia in the 1995 and 1999 FIFA Women's World Cups as well as at the 2000 Sydney Olympics. Tann married English-born soccer coach, Steve Darby in November 1994 and was known as Anissa Tann-Darby until 2001. Captain of the national team between 1991 and 1994, Tann was the first Australian soccer player to achieve 100 caps. She was inducted into the national Soccer Hall of Fame in December 2007.

Tann had made her debut for Australia at the 1988 FIFA Women's Invitation Tournament, a prototype World Cup. In the first match she suffered a broken arm but played on to help Australia upset Brazil (represented by EC Radar) 1–0. Tann played in all four games as Australia made a quarter-final exit in losing 7–0 to hosts China.

After Australia's poor showing at the 1995 FIFA Women's World Cup in Sweden, Tann and Julie Murray were dropped by coach Tom Sermanni. Both were recalled by new coach Greg Brown in 1997.

Tann's international career ended in December 2002 when she tested positive for a banned steroid, nandrolone and received a two-year global suspension. When Tann appealed to the Court of Arbitration for Sport (CAS), her explanation that the substance had been unknowingly ingested through a supplement bought in the United States was accepted, however the ban was upheld due to the strict liability nature of the offence.

== See also ==
- List of women's footballers with 100 or more international caps
