= Bridgette Starr =

Australian soccer player

Personal information
- Full name: Bridgette Louise Starr
- Date of birth: 10 December 1975 (age 50)
- Place of birth: Geelong, Australia
- Position: Defender

International career
Years	Team	Apps	(Gls)
1994–2002	Australia	55	(1)

Bridgette Louise Starr is an Australian indigenous football player. A defender, Bridgette was first named in the Australian Women's soccer squad at 16 years of age. She first played for Australia at 18 years of age, in September 1994 in a one-off test match in Japan.

Bridgette competed in the Oceania World Cup qualifiers in October 1994 in Papua New Guinea, and in the United States Women's Cup in the following month.

Bridgette was selected as one of the 20 national squad players to take a full-time residential scholarship at the Australian Institute of Sport Canberra for 1998, 1999 and early 2000.

She scored her first international goal in the must-win final of the Oceania World Cup qualifiers in October 1998.

Bridgette was a member of the Australian team for the 1999 FIFA Women's World Cup and also a member of the Australian Youth Team which won the 1993 Dana Cup in Denmark; Australian Youth Team tour to New Zealand 1994.

Bridgette won the 1999/2000 Ansett Summer Series national league as a member of the NSW Sapphires. She also won the 1997, National Senior Championship as a member of the Northern NSW State Team.

She was a member of the Australia women's national soccer team that competed at the Sydney Olympic Games.
