= 1995 Women's U.S. Cup =

Tournament details
- Host country: United States
- Dates: July 29 – August 6, 1995
- Teams: 4 (from 4 confederations)

The first Women's U.S. Cup tournament held in 1995, were joined by four teams: Australia, Norway, Chinese Taipei and USA.

== Standings ==
Pos	Team	Pld	W	D	L	GF	GA	GD	Pts
1	United States (C, H)	3	3	0	0	15	3	+12	9
2	Norway	3	2	0	1	15	3	+12	6
3	Australia	3	1	0	2	5	8	−3	3
4	Chinese Taipei	3	0	0	3	3	24	−21	0

Source: RSSSF
(C) Champions; (H) Hosts

== Matches ==
July 29 Round-robin	Norway	2–0	Australia	Worcester, Massachusetts
	unknown

July 30 Round-robin	United States	9–0	Chinese Taipei	New Britain, Connecticut
	Overbeck 18', 62' (pen.); Hamm 18', 34'; Venturini 20', 35', 76'; Akers 72', 81'			Stadium: Veterans Stadium

August 2 Round-robin	Norway	12–1	Chinese Taipei	Philadelphia, Pennsylvania

August 3 Round-robin	United States	4–2	Australia	Piscataway, New Jersey
	Lilly; Akers; Hamm		Iannotta; Casagrande

August 5 Round-robin	Australia	3–2	Chinese Taipei	Richmond, Virginia
	unknown		unknown

August 6 Round-robin	United States	2–1 (a.e.t.)	Norway	Washington, D.C.
	Hamm 62'; Pearman 92'		Petterson 58'
