= Sunni Hughes =

Australian soccer player

Personal information
- Full name: Linda Hughes
- Date of birth: 9 June 1968 (age 58)
- Place of birth: Newcastle, New South Wales, Australia
- Height: 1.73 m (5 ft 8 in)
- Position: Forward

Senior career*
Years	Team	Apps	(Gls)
- Toronto Awaba
- Adamstown
- Fortuna Hjørring
- Panasonic Bambina
- Hunter Region
- Northern NSW Pride

International career^{‡}
1989–2000	Australia	63	(24)
- * Club domestic league appearances and goals as of 22:14, 11 January 2014 (UTC) ‡ National team caps and goals as of 22:14, 11 January 2014 (UTC)

Linda "Sunni" Hughes (born 9 June 1968) is an Australian former women's association football player. She participated in 1995 FIFA Women's World Cup and 2000 Olympics. Hughes played professional club football in Denmark and Japan. In December 2013 she was inducted to Australia's Soccer Hall of Fame.
