= 1995 FIFA Women's World Cup Group B =

Football tournament group stage

Group B of the 1995 FIFA Women's World Cup took place from 6 to 10 June 1995. The group consisted of Canada, England, Nigeria and Norway.

== Standings ==
Pos	Team	Pld	W	D	L	GF	GA	GD	Pts	Qualification
1	Norway	3	3	0	0	17	0	+17	9	Advance to knockout stage
2	England	3	2	0	1	6	6	0	6	Advance to knockout stage
3	Canada	3	0	1	2	5	13	−8	1	
4	Nigeria	3	0	1	2	5	14	−9	1	

Source: FIFA
Rules for classification: Group stage tiebreakers

== Matches ==
All times listed are local, CEST (UTC+2).

=== Norway vs Nigeria ===
6 June 1995
19:00

Norway	8–0	Nigeria
Sandberg 30', 44', 82'; Riise 49'; Aarønes 60', 90'; Medalen 67'; Svensson 76' (pen.)	Report

Tingvalla IP, Karlstad
Attendance: 4,344
Referee: Alain Hamer (Luxembourg)

GK	1	Bente Nordby
DF	2	Tina Svensson
DF	3	Gro Espeseth
DF	13	Merete Myklebust
MF	4	Anne Nymark Andersen	(substituted off) 77'
MF	6	Hege Riise	(substituted off) 69'
MF	7	Tone Haugen
MF	8	Heidi Støre	(substituted off) 55'
FW	9	Kristin Sandberg
FW	10	Linda Medalen
FW	11	Ann Kristin Aarønes
Substitutions:
FW	16	Marianne Pettersen	(substituted in) 55'
MF	18	Tone Gunn Frustøl	(substituted in) 69'
DF	5	Nina Nymark Andersen	(substituted in) 77'
Manager:
Even Pellerud

GK	1	Ann Chiejine
DF	2	Florence Omagbemi
DF	3	Ngozi Ezeocha	(yellow card) 69'	(substituted off) 71'
DF	5	Omo-Love Branch		(substituted off) 73'
DF	10	Mavis Ogun
DF	14	Phoebe Ebimiekumo
MF	8	Rita Nwadike
MF	12	Mercy Akide		(substituted off) 46'
MF	13	Nkiru Okosieme
MF	20	Ann Mukoro
FW	4	Adaku Okoroafor
Substitutions:
MF	18	Patience Avre		(substituted in) 46'
DF	11	Prisca Emeafu		(substituted in) 71'
MF	7	Nkechi Mbilitam	(yellow card) 86'	(substituted in) 73'
Manager:
Paul Hamilton

=== England vs Canada ===
6 June 1995
19:00

England	3–2	Canada
Coultard 51' (pen.), 85'; Spacey 76' (pen.)	Report	Stoumbos 87'; Donnelly 90+1'

Olympia, Helsingborg
Attendance: 655
Referee: Eva Ödlund (Sweden)

GK	1	Pauline Cope
DF	3	Tina Mapes		(substituted off) 70'
DF	4	Samantha Britton
DF	5	Clare Taylor
DF	11	Brenda Sempare
MF	6	Gillian Coultard
MF	7	Marieanne Spacey
MF	8	Debbie Bampton
MF	10	Karen Burke
FW	9	Karen Farley	(yellow card) 77'
FW	14	Karen Walker		(substituted off) 75'
Substitutions:
MF	2	Hope Powell		(substituted in) 70'
MF	12	Kerry Davis		(substituted in) 75'
Manager:
Ted Copeland

GK	18	Carla Chin
DF	4	Michelle Ring
DF	5	Andrea Neil
DF	9	Janine Helland
DF	14	Cathy Ross		(substituted off) 78'
MF	6	Geri Donnelly	(yellow card) 44'
MF	10	Veronica O'Brien
MF	13	Angela Kelly
FW	2	Helen Stoumbos	(yellow card) 17'
FW	3	Charmaine Hooper
FW	17	Silvana Burtini
Substitutions:
DF	15	Suzanne Muir		(substituted in) 78'
Manager:
Sylvie Béliveau

=== Norway vs England ===
8 June 1995
19:00

Norway	2–0	England
Haugen 7'; Riise 37'	Report

Tingvalla IP, Karlstad
Attendance: 5,520
Referee: Eduardo Gamboa (Chile)

GK	1	Bente Nordby
DF	2	Tina Svensson
DF	3	Gro Espeseth
DF	5	Nina Nymark Andersen
DF	13	Merete Myklebust
MF	4	Anne Nymark Andersen	(yellow card) 34'
MF	6	Hege Riise		(substituted off) 85'
MF	7	Tone Haugen
FW	9	Kristin Sandberg		(substituted off) 66'
FW	10	Linda Medalen		(substituted off) 73'
FW	11	Ann Kristin Aarønes
Substitutions:
FW	16	Marianne Pettersen		(substituted in) 66'
FW	15	Randi Leinan		(substituted in) 73'
MF	14	Hege Gunnerød		(substituted in) 85'
Manager:
Even Pellerud

GK	1	Pauline Cope
DF	3	Tina Mapes
DF	4	Samantha Britton		(substituted off) 65'
DF	5	Clare Taylor
DF	11	Brenda Sempare	(yellow card) 54'
MF	6	Gillian Coultard		(substituted off) 82'
MF	7	Marieanne Spacey		(substituted off) 36'
MF	8	Debbie Bampton
MF	10	Karen Burke
FW	9	Karen Farley
FW	14	Karen Walker
Substitutions:
MF	2	Hope Powell		(substituted in) 36'
MF	12	Kerry Davis		(substituted in) 65'
MF	20	Becky Easton		(substituted in) 82'
Manager:
Ted Copeland

=== Nigeria vs Canada ===
8 June 1995
19:00

Nigeria	3–3	Canada
Nwadike 26'; Avre 60'; Okoroafor 77'	Report	Burtini 12', 55'; Donnelly 20'

Olympia, Helsingborg
Attendance: 250
Referee: Pirom Un-prasert (Thailand)

GK	1	Ann Chiejine
DF	2	Florence Omagbemi
DF	5	Omo-Love Branch		(substituted off) 41'
DF	10	Mavis Ogun
DF	11	Prisca Emeafu
DF	14	Phoebe Ebimiekumo
MF	6	Yinka Kudaisi
MF	8	Rita Nwadike
MF	18	Patience Avre	(yellow card) 14'
FW	4	Adaku Okoroafor
FW	15	Maureen Mmadu		(substituted off) 60'
Substitutions:
MF	7	Nkechi Mbilitam	(yellow card) 83'	(substituted in) 41'
MF	20	Ann Mukoro		(substituted in) 60'
Manager:
Paul Hamilton

GK	18	Carla Chin
DF	4	Michelle Ring
DF	5	Andrea Neil
DF	9	Janine Helland
DF	16	Luce Mongrain	(yellow card) 44'
MF	6	Geri Donnelly
MF	10	Veronica O'Brien		(substituted off) 61'
MF	11	Annie Caron		(substituted off) 77'
MF	13	Angela Kelly
FW	3	Charmaine Hooper
FW	17	Silvana Burtini
Substitutions:
MF	19	Suzanne Gerrior		(substituted in) 61'
FW	2	Helen Stoumbos		(substituted in) 77'
Manager:
Sylvie Béliveau

=== Norway vs Canada ===
10 June 1995
16:00

Norway	7–0	Canada
Aarønes 4', 21', 90+3'; Riise 12'; Pettersen 71', 89'; Leinan 84'	Report

Strömvallen, Gävle
Attendance: 2,715
Referee: Maria Edilene Siqueira (Brazil)

GK	1	Bente Nordby
DF	2	Tina Svensson
DF	3	Gro Espeseth
DF	13	Merete Myklebust
MF	4	Anne Nymark Andersen
MF	6	Hege Riise	(substituted off) 46'
MF	7	Tone Haugen	(substituted off) 69'
MF	8	Heidi Støre
FW	10	Linda Medalen	(substituted off) 46'
FW	11	Ann Kristin Aarønes
FW	16	Marianne Pettersen
Substitutions:
FW	9	Kristin Sandberg	(substituted in) 46'
FW	15	Randi Leinan	(substituted in) 46'
DF	19	Agnete Carlsen	(substituted in) 69'
Manager:
Even Pellerud

GK	18	Carla Chin
DF	4	Michelle Ring	(yellow card) 88'
DF	9	Janine Helland
DF	14	Cathy Ross
DF	15	Suzanne Muir		(substituted off) 85'
MF	6	Geri Donnelly	(yellow card) 80'
MF	11	Annie Caron	(yellow card) 26'
MF	13	Angela Kelly
FW	2	Helen Stoumbos
FW	3	Charmaine Hooper	(yellow card) 36'
FW	17	Silvana Burtini
Substitutions:
DF	5	Andrea Neil		(substituted in) 85'
Manager:
Sylvie Béliveau

=== Nigeria vs England ===
10 June 1995
16:00

Nigeria	2–3	England
Okoroafor 13'; Nwadike 74'	Report	Farley 10', 38'; Walker 27'

Tingvalla IP, Karlstad
Attendance: 1,843
Referee: Ingrid Jonsson (Sweden)

GK	1	Ann Chiejine
DF	2	Florence Omagbemi
DF	3	Ngozi Ezeocha		(substituted off) 44'
DF	10	Mavis Ogun
DF	11	Prisca Emeafu
DF	14	Phoebe Ebimiekumo	(yellow card) 5'
MF	6	Yinka Kudaisi	(yellow card) 68'
MF	8	Rita Nwadike
MF	18	Patience Avre		(substituted off) 47'
MF	20	Ann Mukoro
FW	4	Adaku Okoroafor
Substitutions:
FW	15	Maureen Mmadu	(yellow card) 90'	(substituted in) 44'
MF	13	Nkiru Okosieme		(substituted in) 47'
Manager:
Paul Hamilton

GK	13	Lesley Higgs
DF	3	Tina Mapes
DF	5	Clare Taylor	(substituted off) 81'
DF	11	Brenda Sempare	(substituted off) 58'
MF	6	Gillian Coultard
MF	7	Marieanne Spacey	(substituted off) 70'
MF	8	Debbie Bampton
MF	10	Karen Burke
MF	12	Kerry Davis
FW	9	Karen Farley
FW	14	Karen Walker
Substitutions:
MF	20	Becky Easton	(substituted in) 58'
MF	2	Hope Powell	(substituted in) 70'
DF	4	Samantha Britton	(substituted in) 81'
Manager:
Ted Copeland

== See also ==
- Canada at the FIFA Women's World Cup
- England at the FIFA Women's World Cup
- Nigeria at the FIFA Women's World Cup
- Norway at the FIFA Women's World Cup
