= Nigeria at the FIFA Women's World Cup =

The Nigeria women's national football team has represented Nigeria at the FIFA Women's World Cup at all nine stagings of the tournament, one of seven teams to do so. Despite the rich history, however, Nigeria's successes have been rather modest, having only progressed to the knockout phase in three occasions.

== FIFA Women's World Cup record ==
FIFA Women's World Cup record
Year	Result	Position	Pld	W	D	L	GF	GA
(China) 1991	Group stage	10th	3	0	0	3	0	7
(Sweden) 1995	Group stage	11th	3	0	1	2	5	14
(United States) 1999	Quarter-finals	7th	4	2	0	2	8	12
(United States) 2003	Group stage	15th	3	0	0	3	0	11
(China) 2007	Group stage	13th	3	0	1	2	1	4
(Germany) 2011	Group stage	9th	3	1	0	2	1	2
(Canada) 2015	Group stage	21st	3	0	1	2	3	6
(France) 2019	Round of 16	16th	4	1	0	3	2	7
(Australia) (New Zealand) 2023	Round of 16	10th	4	1	3	0	3	2
(Brazil) 2027	To be determined							
(Costa Rica) (Jamaica) (Mexico) (United States) 2031	To be determined							
(United Kingdom) 2035	To be determined							
Total	9/12	0 titles	30	5	6	19	23	65

FIFA Women's World Cup history
Year	Round	Date	Opponent	Result	Stadium
(China) 1991	Group stage	17 November	Germany	L 0–4	Jiangmen Stadium, Jiangmen
(China) 1991	Group stage	19 November	Italy	L 0–1	Zhongshan Stadium, Zhongshan
(China) 1991	Group stage	21 November	Chinese Taipei	L 0–2	Jiangmen Stadium, Jiangmen
(Sweden) 1995	Group stage	6 June	Norway	L 0–8	Tingvallen, Karlstad
(Sweden) 1995	Group stage	8 June	Canada	D 3–3	Olympia, Helsingborg
(Sweden) 1995	Group stage	10 June	England	L 2–3	Tingvallen, Karlstad
(United States) 1999	Group stage	20 June	North Korea	W 2–1	Rose Bowl, Pasadena
(United States) 1999	Group stage	24 June	United States	L 1–7	Soldier Field, Chicago
(United States) 1999	Group stage	27 June	Denmark	W 2–0	Jack Kent Cooke Stadium, Landover
(United States) 1999	Quarter-finals	1 July	Brazil	L 3–4 (a.e.t.)	Jack Kent Cooke Stadium, Landover
(United States) 2003	Group stage	20 September	North Korea	L 0–3	Lincoln Financial Field, Philadelphia
(United States) 2003	Group stage	25 September	United States	L 0–5	Lincoln Financial Field, Philadelphia
(United States) 2003	Group stage	28 September	Sweden	L 0–3	Columbus Crew Stadium, Columbus
(China) 2007	Group stage	11 September	Sweden	D 1–1	Chengdu Sports Center, Chengdu
(China) 2007	Group stage	14 September	North Korea	L 0–2	Chengdu Sports Center, Chengdu
(China) 2007	Group stage	18 September	United States	L 0–1	Hongkou Stadium, Shanghai
(Germany) 2011	Group stage	26 June	France	L 0–1	Rhein-Neckar-Arena, Sinsheim
(Germany) 2011	Group stage	30 June	Germany	L 0–1	Commerzbank-Arena, Frankfurt
(Germany) 2011	Group stage	5 July	Canada	W 1–0	Rudolf-Harbig-Stadion, Dresden
(Canada) 2015	Group stage	8 June	Sweden	D 3–3	Winnipeg Stadium, Winnipeg
(Canada) 2015	Group stage	12 June	Australia	L 0–2	Winnipeg Stadium, Winnipeg
(Canada) 2015	Group stage	16 June	United States	L 0–1	BC Place, Vancouver
(France) 2019	Group stage	8 June	Norway	L 0–3	Stade Auguste-Delaune, Reims
(France) 2019	Group stage	12 June	South Korea	W 2–0	Stade des Alpes, Grenoble
(France) 2019	Group stage	17 June	France	L 0–1	Roazhon Park, Rennes
(France) 2019	Round of 16	22 June	Germany	L 0–3	Stade des Alpes, Grenoble
(Australia) / (New Zealand) 2023	Group stage	21 July	Canada	D 0–0	Melbourne Rectangular Stadium, Melbourne
(Australia) / (New Zealand) 2023	Group stage	26 July	Australia	W 3–2	Lang Park, Brisbane
(Australia) / (New Zealand) 2023	Group stage	31 July	Republic of Ireland	D 0–0	Lang Park, Brisbane
(Australia) / (New Zealand) 2023	Round of 16	7 August	England	D 0–0 (4–2(p))	Lang Park, Brisbane

== 1991 FIFA Women's World Cup ==
=== Group C ===
Pos	Team	Pld	W	D	L	GF	GA	GD	Pts	Qualification
1	Germany	3	3	0	0	9	0	+9	6	Advance to knockout stage
2	Italy	3	2	0	1	6	2	+4	4	Advance to knockout stage
3	Chinese Taipei	3	1	0	2	2	8	−6	2	Advance to knockout stage
4	Nigeria	3	0	0	3	0	7	−7	0	

Source: FIFA
Rules for classification: Group stage tiebreakers
17 November 1991
15:30

Germany	4–0	Nigeria
Neid 16'; Mohr 32', 34'; Gottschlich 57'	Report

Jiangmen Stadium, Jiangmen
Attendance: 14,000
Referee: Rafael Rodríguez Medina (El Salvador)

19 November 1991
15:30

Italy	1–0	Nigeria
Morace 68'	Report

Zhongshan Stadium, Zhongshan
Attendance: 12,000
Referee: Jim McCluskey (Scotland)

21 November 1991
19:45

Chinese Taipei	2–0	Nigeria
Lin Mei-chun 38'; Chou Tai-ying 55'	Report

Jiangmen Stadium, Jiangmen
Attendance: 14,000
Referee: Rafael Rodríguez Medina (El Salvador)

== 1995 FIFA Women's World Cup ==
=== Group B ===
Pos	Team	Pld	W	D	L	GF	GA	GD	Pts	Qualification
1	Norway	3	3	0	0	17	0	+17	9	Advance to knockout stage
2	England	3	2	0	1	6	6	0	6	Advance to knockout stage
3	Canada	3	0	1	2	5	13	−8	1	
4	Nigeria	3	0	1	2	5	14	−9	1	

Source: FIFA
Rules for classification: Group stage tiebreakers
6 June 1995
19:00

Norway	8–0	Nigeria
Sandberg 30', 44', 82'; Riise 49'; Aarønes 60', 90'; Medalen 67'; Svensson 76' (pen.)	Report

Tingvalla IP, Karlstad
Attendance: 4,344
Referee: Alain Hamer (Luxembourg)

8 June 1995
19:00

Nigeria	3–3	Canada
Nwadike 26'; Avre 60'; Okoroafor 77'	Report	Burtini 12', 55'; Donnelly 20'

Olympia, Helsingborg
Attendance: 250
Referee: Pirom Un-prasert (Thailand)

10 June 1995
16:00

Nigeria	2–3	England
Okoroafor 13'; Nwadike 74'	Report	Farley 10', 38'; Walker 27'

Tingvalla IP, Karlstad
Attendance: 1,843
Referee: Ingrid Jonsson (Sweden)

== 1999 FIFA Women's World Cup ==
=== Group A ===
Pos	Team	Pld	W	D	L	GF	GA	GD	Pts	Qualification
1	United States (H)	3	3	0	0	13	1	+12	9	Advance to knockout stage
2	Nigeria	3	2	0	1	5	8	−3	6	Advance to knockout stage
3	North Korea	3	1	0	2	4	6	−2	3	
4	Denmark	3	0	0	3	1	8	−7	0	

Source: FIFA
Rules for classification: Group stage tiebreakers
(H) Hosts
June 20, 1999
18:30 PDT (UTC−7)

North Korea	1–2	Nigeria
Jo Song-ok 74'	Report	Akide 50'; Nwadike 79'

Rose Bowl, Pasadena
Attendance: 17,100
Referee: Katriina Elovirta (Finland)

June 24, 1999
19:00 CDT (UTC−5)

United States	7–1	Nigeria
I. Chiejine 19' (o.g.); Hamm 20'; Milbrett 23', 83'; Lilly 32'; Akers 39'; Parlow 42'	Report	Okosieme 2'

Soldier Field, Chicago
Attendance: 65,080
Referee: Nicole Petignat (Switzerland)

June 27, 1999
16:00 EDT (UTC−4)

Nigeria	2–0	Denmark
Akide 25'; Okosieme 81'	Report

Jack Kent Cooke Stadium, Landover
Attendance: 22,109
Referee: Maria Edilene Siqueira (Brazil)

=== Quarterfinals ===
July 1, 1999
21:30 EDT (UTC−4)

Brazil	4–3 (a.e.t./g.g.)	Nigeria
Cidinha 4', 22'; Nenê 35'; Sissi 104'	Report	Emeafu 63'; Okosieme 72'; Egbe 85'

Jack Kent Cooke Stadium, Landover
Attendance: 54,642
Referee: Virginia Tovar (Mexico)

== 2003 FIFA Women's World Cup ==
=== Group A ===
Pos	Team	Pld	W	D	L	GF	GA	GD	Pts	Qualification
1	United States (H)	3	3	0	0	11	1	+10	9	Advance to knockout stage
2	Sweden	3	2	0	1	5	3	+2	6	Advance to knockout stage
3	North Korea	3	1	0	2	3	4	−1	3	
4	Nigeria	3	0	0	3	0	11	−11	0	

Source: FIFA
Rules for classification: Group stage tiebreakers
(H) Hosts
September 20, 2003
14:45 EDT (UTC−4)

Nigeria	0–3	North Korea
	Report	Jin Pyol-hui 13', 88'; Ri Un-gyong 73'

Lincoln Financial Field, Philadelphia
Attendance: 24,347
Referee: Nicole Petignat (Switzerland)
September 25, 2003
19:30 EDT (UTC−4)

United States	5–0	Nigeria
Hamm 6' (pen.), 12'; Parlow 47'; Wambach 65'; Foudy 89' (pen.)	Report

Lincoln Financial Field, Philadelphia
Attendance: 31,553
Referee: Florencia Romano (Argentina)
September 28, 2003
13:00 EDT (UTC−4)

Sweden	3–0	Nigeria
Ljungberg 56', 79'; Moström 81'	Report

Columbus Crew Stadium, Columbus
Attendance: 22,828
Referee: Sonia Denoncourt (Canada)

== 2007 FIFA Women's World Cup ==
=== Group B ===
Pos	Team	Pld	W	D	L	GF	GA	GD	Pts	Qualification
1	United States	3	2	1	0	5	2	+3	7	Advance to knockout stage
2	North Korea	3	1	1	1	5	4	+1	4	Advance to knockout stage
3	Sweden	3	1	1	1	3	4	−1	4	
4	Nigeria	3	0	1	2	1	4	−3	1	

Source: FIFA
Rules for classification: Group stage tiebreakers
11 September 2007
20:00

Nigeria	1–1	Sweden
Uwak 82'	Report	Svensson 50'

Chengdu Sports Centre Stadium, Chengdu
Attendance: 35,100
Referee: Niu Huijun (China PR)

14 September 2007
20:00

North Korea	2–0	Nigeria
Kim Kyong-hwa 17'; Ri Kum-suk 21'	Report

Chengdu Sports Centre Stadium, Chengdu
Attendance: 35,600
Referee: Tammy Ogston (Australia)

18 September 2007
20:00

Nigeria	0–1	United States
	Report	Chalupny 1'

Hongkou Football Stadium, Shanghai
Attendance: 6,100
Referee: Mayumi Oiwa (Japan)

== 2011 FIFA Women's World Cup ==
=== Group A ===
Pos	Team	Pld	W	D	L	GF	GA	GD	Pts	Qualification
1	Germany (H)	3	3	0	0	7	3	+4	9	Advance to knockout stage
2	France	3	2	0	1	7	4	+3	6	Advance to knockout stage
3	Nigeria	3	1	0	2	1	2	−1	3	
4	Canada	3	0	0	3	1	7	−6	0	

Source: FIFA
Rules for classification: Group stage tiebreakers
(H) Hosts
26 June 2011
15:00

Nigeria	0–1	France
	Report	Delie 56'

Rhein-Neckar-Arena, Sinsheim
Attendance: 25,475
Referee: Kari Seitz (United States)

30 June 2011
20:45

Germany	1–0	Nigeria
Laudehr 54'	Report

Waldstadion, Frankfurt
Attendance: 48,817
Referee: Cha Sung-mi (South Korea)

5 July 2011
20:45

Canada	0–1	Nigeria
	Report	Nkwocha 73'

Rudolf-Harbig-Stadion, Dresden
Attendance: 13,638
Referee: Finau Vulivuli (Fiji)

== 2015 FIFA Women's World Cup ==
=== Group D ===
Pos	Team	Pld	W	D	L	GF	GA	GD	Pts	Qualification
1	United States	3	2	1	0	4	1	+3	7	Advance to knockout stage
2	Australia	3	1	1	1	4	4	0	4	Advance to knockout stage
3	Sweden	3	0	3	0	4	4	0	3	Advance to knockout stage
4	Nigeria	3	0	1	2	3	6	−3	1	

Source: FIFA
Rules for classification: Group stage tiebreakers
8 June 2015
15:00 CDT (UTC−5)

Sweden	3–3	Nigeria
Oparanozie 21' (o.g.); Fischer 31'; Sembrant 60'	Report	Okobi 50'; Oshoala 53'; Ordega 87'

Investors Group Field, Winnipeg
Attendance: 31,148
Referee: Ri Hyang-ok (North Korea)

12 June 2015
16:00 CDT (UTC−5)

Australia	2–0	Nigeria
Simon 29', 68'	Report

Investors Group Field, Winnipeg
Attendance: 32,716
Referee: Stéphanie Frappart (France)

16 June 2015
17:00 PDT (UTC−7)

Nigeria	0–1	United States
	Report	Wambach 45'

BC Place, Vancouver
Attendance: 52,193
Referee: Kateryna Monzul (Ukraine)

== 2019 FIFA Women's World Cup ==
=== Group A ===
Pos	Team	Pld	W	D	L	GF	GA	GD	Pts	Qualification
1	France (H)	3	3	0	0	7	1	+6	9	Advance to knockout stage
2	Norway	3	2	0	1	6	3	+3	6	Advance to knockout stage
3	Nigeria	3	1	0	2	2	4	−2	3	Advance to knockout stage
4	South Korea	3	0	0	3	1	8	−7	0	

Source: FIFA
Rules for classification: Group stage tiebreakers
(H) Hosts
8 June 2019
21:00

Norway	3–0	Nigeria
Reiten 17'; Utland 34'; Ohale 37' (o.g.)	Report

Stade Auguste-Delaune, Reims
Attendance: 11,058
Referee: Kate Jacewicz (Australia)

12 June 2019
15:00

Nigeria	2–0	South Korea
Kim Do-yeon 29' (o.g.); Oshoala 75'	Report

Stade des Alpes, Grenoble
Attendance: 11,252
Referee: Anastasia Pustovoitova (Russia)

17 June 2019
21:00

Nigeria	0–1	France
	Report	Renard 79' (pen.)

Roazhon Park, Rennes
Attendance: 28,267
Referee: Melissa Borjas (Honduras)

=== Round of 16 ===
22 June 2019
17:30

Germany	3–0	Nigeria
Popp 20'; Däbritz 27' (pen.); Schüller 82'	Report

Stade des Alpes, Grenoble
Attendance: 17,988
Referee: Yoshimi Yamashita (Japan)

== 2023 FIFA Women's World Cup ==
=== Group B ===
Pos	Team	Pld	W	D	L	GF	GA	GD	Pts	Qualification
1	Australia (H)	3	2	0	1	7	3	+4	6	Advance to knockout stage
2	Nigeria	3	1	2	0	3	2	+1	5	Advance to knockout stage
3	Canada	3	1	1	1	2	5	−3	4	
4	Republic of Ireland	3	0	1	2	1	3	−2	1	

Source: FIFA
Rules for classification: Group stage tiebreakers
(H) Hosts
21 July 2023
12:30 UTC+10

Nigeria	0–0	Canada
	Report

Melbourne Rectangular Stadium, Melbourne
Attendance: 21,410
Referee: Lina Lehtovaara (Finland)

27 July 2023
20:00 UTC+10

Australia	2–3	Nigeria
Van Egmond 45+1'; Kennedy 90+10'	Report	Kanu 45+6'; Ohale 65'; Oshoala 72'

Lang Park, Brisbane
Attendance: 49,156
Referee: Esther Staubli (Switzerland)

31 July 2023
20:00 UTC+10

Republic of Ireland	0–0	Nigeria
	Report

Lang Park, Brisbane
Attendance: 24,884
Referee: Katia García (Mexico)

=== Round of 16 ===
7 August 2023
17:30 UTC+10

England	0–0 (a.e.t.)	Nigeria
	Report
Penalties
Stanway (penalty missed); England (penalty scored); Daly (penalty scored); Greenwood (penalty scored); Kelly (penalty scored)	4–2	(penalty missed) Oparanozie; (penalty missed) Alozie; (penalty scored) Ajibade; (penalty scored) Ucheibe

Lang Park, Brisbane
Attendance: 49,461
Referee: Melissa Borjas (Honduras)

== Goalscorers ==
Player	Goals	1991	1995	1999	2003	2007	2011	2015	2019	2023
Rita Nwadike	3		2	1						
Nkiru Okosieme	3			3						
Asisat Oshoala	3							1	1	1
Mercy Akide	2			2						
Adaku Okoroafor	2		2							
Patience Avre	1		1							
Nkechi Egbe	1			1						
Prisca Emeafu	1			1						
Perpetua Nkwocha	1						1			
Ngozi Okobi	1							1		
Francisca Ordega	1							1		
Cynthia Uwak	1					1				
Uchenna Kanu	1									1
Osinachi Ohale	1									1
Own goals	1								1	
Total	23	0	5	8	0	1	1	3	2	3

Own goals scored for opponents

- Ifeanyi Chiejine (scored for United States in 1999)
- Desire Oparanozie (scored for Sweden in 2015)

== Head-to-head record ==
Opponent	Pld	W	D	L	GF	GA	GD	Win %
Australia	2	1	0	1	3	4	−1	50.00
Brazil	1	0	0	1	3	4	−1	0.00
Canada	3	1	2	0	4	3	+1	33.33
Chinese Taipei	1	0	0	1	0	2	−2	0.00
Denmark	1	1	0	0	2	0	+2	100.00
England	2	0	1	1	2	3	−1	0.00
France	2	0	0	2	0	2	−2	0.00
Germany	3	0	0	3	0	8	−8	0.00
Italy	1	0	0	1	0	1	−1	0.00
North Korea	3	1	0	2	2	6	−4	33.33
Norway	2	0	0	2	0	11	−11	0.00
Republic of Ireland	1	0	1	0	0	0	+0	0.00
South Korea	1	1	0	0	2	0	+2	100.00
Sweden	3	0	2	1	4	7	−3	0.00
United States	4	0	0	4	1	14	−13	0.00
Total	30	5	6	19	23	65	−42	16.67
