= Canada at the FIFA Women's World Cup =

Performance of the Canada women's national soccer team at the FIFA Women's World Cup

The Canada women's national soccer team has represented Canada at eight of the nine stagings of the FIFA Women's World Cup. The inaugural tournament in 1991 is currently the only edition for which they failed to qualify.

== Overall record ==
| Year | Result | Rank | Pld | W | D | L | GF | GA |
|---|---|---|---|---|---|---|---|---|
| (China) 1991 | Did not qualify | | | | | | | |
| (Sweden) 1995 | Group stage | 10/12 | 3 | 0 | 1 | 2 | 5 | 13 |
| (United States) 1999 | Group stage | 12/16 | 3 | 0 | 1 | 2 | 3 | 12 |
| (United States) 2003 | Fourth place | 4/16 | 6 | 3 | 0 | 3 | 10 | 10 |
| (China) 2007 | Group stage | 9/16 | 3 | 1 | 1 | 1 | 7 | 4 |
| (Germany) 2011 | Group stage | 16/16 | 3 | 0 | 0 | 3 | 1 | 7 |
| (Canada) 2015 | Quarter-finals | 6/24 | 5 | 2 | 2 | 1 | 4 | 3 |
| (France) 2019 | Round of 16 | 11/24 | 4 | 2 | 0 | 2 | 4 | 3 |
| (Australia) (New Zealand) 2023 | Group stage | 21/32 | 3 | 1 | 1 | 1 | 2 | 5 |
| (Brazil) 2027 | To be determined | | | | | | | |
| (Costa Rica) (Jamaica) (Mexico) (United States) 2031 | To be determined | | | | | | | |
| (United Kingdom) 2035 | To be determined | | | | | | | |
| Total | 8/10 | 4th | 30 | 9 | 6 | 15 | 36 | 57 |

FIFA Women's World Cup matches
| Year | Round | Date | Opponent | Result | Stadium |
|---|---|---|---|---|---|
| (Sweden) 1995 | Group stage | June 6 | England | L 2–3 | Olympia Stadion, Helsingborg |
| (Sweden) 1995 | Group stage | June 8 | Nigeria | D 3–3 | Olympia Stadion, Helsingborg |
| (Sweden) 1995 | Group stage | June 10 | Norway | L 0–7 | Strömvallen, Gävle |
| (United States) 1999 | Group stage | June 19 | Japan | D 1–1 | Spartan Stadium, San Jose |
| (United States) 1999 | Group stage | June 23 | Norway | L 1–7 | Jack Kent Cooke Stadium, Landover |
| (United States) 1999 | Group stage | June 26 | Russia | L 1–4 | Giants Stadium, East Rutherford |
| (United States) 2003 | Group stage | September 20 | Germany | L 1–4 | Columbus Crew Stadium, Columbus |
| (United States) 2003 | Group stage | September 24 | Argentina | W 3–0 | Columbus Crew Stadium, Columbus |
| (United States) 2003 | Group stage | September 27 | Japan | W 3–1 | Gillette Stadium, Foxborough |
| (United States) 2003 | Quarter-finals | October 2 | China | W 1–0 | Civic Stadium, Portland |
| (United States) 2003 | Semi-finals | October 5 | Sweden | L 1–2 | Civic Stadium, Portland |
| (United States) 2003 | Third place play-off | October 11 | United States | L 1–3 | The Home Depot Center, Carson |
| (China) 2007 | Group stage | September 12 | Norway | L 1–2 | Yellow Dragon Sports Center, Hangzhou |
| (China) 2007 | Group stage | September 15 | Ghana | W 4–0 | Yellow Dragon Sports Center, Hangzhou |
| (China) 2007 | Group stage | September 20 | Australia | D 2–2 | Chengdu Sports Center, Chengdu |
| (Germany) 2011 | Group stage | June 26 | Germany | L 1–2 | Olympiastadion, Berlin |
| (Germany) 2011 | Group stage | June 30 | France | L 0–4 | Ruhrstadion, Bochum |
| (Germany) 2011 | Group stage | July 5 | Nigeria | L 0–1 | Rudolf-Harbig-Stadion, Dresden |
| (Canada) 2015 | Group stage | June 6 | China | W 1–0 | Commonwealth Stadium, Edmonton |
| (Canada) 2015 | Group stage | June 11 | New Zealand | D 0–0 | Commonwealth Stadium, Edmonton |
| (Canada) 2015 | Group stage | June 15 | Netherlands | D 1–1 | Olympic Stadium, Montreal |
| (Canada) 2015 | Round of 16 | June 21 | Switzerland | W 1–0 | BC Place, Vancouver |
| (Canada) 2015 | Quarter-finals | June 27 | England | L 1–2 | BC Place, Vancouver |
| (France) 2019 | Group stage | June 10 | Cameroon | W 1–0 | Stade de la Mosson, Montpellier |
| (France) 2019 | Group stage | June 15 | New Zealand | W 2–0 | Stade des Alpes, Grenoble |
| (France) 2019 | Group stage | June 20 | Netherlands | L 1–2 | Stade Auguste-Delaune, Reims |
| (France) 2019 | Round of 16 | June 24 | Sweden | L 0–1 | Parc des Princes, Paris |
| (Australia) (New Zealand) 2023 | Group stage | July 21 | Nigeria | D 0–0 | Melbourne Rectangular Stadium, Melbourne |
| (Australia) (New Zealand) 2023 | Group stage | July 26 | Republic of Ireland | W 2–1 | Perth Rectangular Stadium, Perth |
| (Australia) (New Zealand) 2023 | Group stage | July 31 | Australia | L 0–4 | Melbourne Rectangular Stadium, Melbourne |

== 1995 FIFA Women's World Cup ==
=== Group B ===
| Pos | Team | Pld | W | D | L | GF | GA | GD | Pts | Qualification |
|---|---|---|---|---|---|---|---|---|---|---|
| 1 | Norway | 3 | 3 | 0 | 0 | 17 | 0 | +17 | 9 | Advance to knockout stage |
| 2 | England | 3 | 2 | 0 | 1 | 6 | 6 | 0 | 6 | Advance to knockout stage |
| 3 | Canada | 3 | 0 | 1 | 2 | 5 | 13 | −8 | 1 | |
| 4 | Nigeria | 3 | 0 | 1 | 2 | 5 | 14 | −9 | 1 | |

Source: FIFA
Rules for classification: Group stage tiebreakers
6 June 1995
19:00

| England | 3–2 | Canada |
|---|---|---|
| Coultard 51' (pen.), 85'; Spacey 76' (pen.) | Report | Stoumbos 87'; Donnelly 90+1' |

Olympia, Helsingborg
Attendance: 655
Referee: Eva Ödlund (Sweden)
8 June 1995
19:00

| Nigeria | 3–3 | Canada |
|---|---|---|
| Nwadike 26'; Avre 60'; Okoroafor 77' | Report | Burtini 12', 55'; Donnelly 20' |

Olympia, Helsingborg
Attendance: 250
Referee: Pirom Un-prasert (Thailand)
10 June 1995
16:00

| Norway | 7–0 | Canada |
|---|---|---|
| Aarønes 4', 21', 90+3'; Riise 12'; Pettersen 71', 89'; Leinan 84' | Report |

Strömvallen, Gävle
Attendance: 2,715
Referee: Maria Edilene Siqueira (Brazil)

== 1999 FIFA Women's World Cup ==
=== Group C ===
| Pos | Team | Pld | W | D | L | GF | GA | GD | Pts | Qualification |
|---|---|---|---|---|---|---|---|---|---|---|
| 1 | Norway | 3 | 3 | 0 | 0 | 13 | 2 | +11 | 9 | Advance to knockout stage |
| 2 | Russia | 3 | 2 | 0 | 1 | 10 | 3 | +7 | 6 | Advance to knockout stage |
| 3 | Canada | 3 | 0 | 1 | 2 | 3 | 12 | −9 | 1 | |
| 4 | Japan | 3 | 0 | 1 | 2 | 1 | 10 | −9 | 1 | |

Source: FIFA
Rules for classification: Group stage tiebreakers
June 19, 1999
19:00 PDT (UTC−7)

| Japan | 1–1 | Canada |
|---|---|---|
| Otake 64' | Report | Burtini 32' |

Spartan Stadium, San Jose
Attendance: 23,298
Referee: Maria Edilene Siqueira (Brazil)
June 23, 1999
18:00 EDT (UTC−4)

| Norway | 7–1 | Canada |
|---|---|---|
| Aarønes 8', 36'; Lehn 49'; Riise 54'; Medalen 62'; Pettersen 76'; S. Gulbrandsen 87' | Report | Hooper 31' |

Jack Kent Cooke Stadium, Landover
Attendance: 16,448
Referee: Tammy Ogston (Australia)
June 26, 1999
12:00 EDT (UTC−4)

| Canada | 1–4 | Russia |
|---|---|---|
| Hooper 76' | Report | Grigorieva 54'; Fomina 66', 86'; O. Karasseva 90+1' |

Giants Stadium, East Rutherford
Attendance: 29,401
Referee: Zuo Xiudi (China PR)

== 2003 FIFA Women's World Cup ==
=== Group C ===
| Pos | Team | Pld | W | D | L | GF | GA | GD | Pts | Qualification |
|---|---|---|---|---|---|---|---|---|---|---|
| 1 | Germany | 3 | 3 | 0 | 0 | 13 | 2 | +11 | 9 | Advance to knockout stage |
| 2 | Canada | 3 | 2 | 0 | 1 | 7 | 5 | +2 | 6 | Advance to knockout stage |
| 3 | Japan | 3 | 1 | 0 | 2 | 7 | 6 | +1 | 3 | |
| 4 | Argentina | 3 | 0 | 0 | 3 | 1 | 15 | −14 | 0 | |

Source: FIFA
Rules for classification: Group stage tiebreakers
September 20, 2003
17:45 EDT (UTC−4)

| Germany | 4–1 | Canada |
|---|---|---|
| Wiegmann 39' (pen.); Gottschlich 47'; Prinz 75'; Garefrekes 90+2' | Report | Sinclair 4' |

Columbus Crew Stadium, Columbus
Attendance: 16,409
Referee: Im Eun-ju (South Korea)
September 24, 2003
20:30 EDT (UTC−4)

| Canada | 3–0 | Argentina |
|---|---|---|
| Hooper 19' (pen.); Latham 79', 82' | Report |

Columbus Crew Stadium, Columbus
Attendance: 15,529
Referee: Nicole Petignat (Switzerland)
September 27, 2003
15:30 EDT (UTC−4)

| Canada | 3–1 | Japan |
|---|---|---|
| Latham 36'; Sinclair 49'; Lang 72' | Report | Sawa 20' |

Gillette Stadium, Foxborough
Attendance: 14,356
Referee: Im Eun-ju (South Korea)

=== Quarterfinals ===
October 2, 2003
19:30 PDT (UTC−7)

| China | 0–1 | Canada |
|---|---|---|
| | Report | Hooper 7' |

PGE Park, Portland
Attendance: 20,012
Referee: Kari Seitz (United States)

=== Semifinals ===
October 5, 2003
19:30 PDT (UTC−7)

| Sweden | 2–1 | Canada |
|---|---|---|
| Moström 79'; Öqvist 86' | Report | Lang 64' |

PGE Park, Portland
Attendance: 27,623
Referee: Katriina Elovirta (Finland)

=== Third place match ===
October 11, 2003
12:30 PDT (UTC−7)

| United States | 3–1 | Canada |
|---|---|---|
| Lilly 22'; Boxx 51'; Milbrett 80' | Report | Sinclair 38' |

Home Depot Center, Carson
Attendance: 25,253
Referee: Tammy Ogston (Australia)

== 2007 FIFA Women's World Cup ==
=== Group C ===
| Pos | Team | Pld | W | D | L | GF | GA | GD | Pts | Qualification |
|---|---|---|---|---|---|---|---|---|---|---|
| 1 | Norway | 3 | 2 | 1 | 0 | 10 | 4 | +6 | 7 | Advance to knockout stage |
| 2 | Australia | 3 | 1 | 2 | 0 | 7 | 4 | +3 | 5 | Advance to knockout stage |
| 3 | Canada | 3 | 1 | 1 | 1 | 7 | 4 | +3 | 4 | |
| 4 | Ghana | 3 | 0 | 0 | 3 | 3 | 15 | −12 | 0 | |

Source: FIFA
Rules for classification: Group stage tiebreakers
12 September 2007
20:00

| Norway | 2–1 | Canada |
|---|---|---|
| R. Gulbrandsen 52'; Stangeland Horpestad 81' | Report | Chapman 33' |

Yellow Dragon Stadium, Hangzhou
Attendance: 30,752
Referee: Christine Beck (Germany)
15 September 2007
17:00

| Canada | 4–0 | Ghana |
|---|---|---|
| Sinclair 16', 62'; Schmidt 55'; Franko 77' | Report |

Yellow Dragon Stadium, Hangzhou
Attendance: 33,835
Referee: Nicole Petignat (Switzerland)
20 September 2007
17:00

| Australia | 2–2 | Canada |
|---|---|---|
| McCallum 53'; Salisbury 90+2' | Report | Tancredi 1'; Sinclair 85' |

Chengdu Sports Centre Stadium, Chengdu
Attendance: 29,300
Referee: Gyöngyi Gaál (Hungary)

== 2011 FIFA Women's World Cup ==
=== Group A ===
| Pos | Team | Pld | W | D | L | GF | GA | GD | Pts | Qualification |
|---|---|---|---|---|---|---|---|---|---|---|
| 1 | Germany (H) | 3 | 3 | 0 | 0 | 7 | 3 | +4 | 9 | Advance to knockout stage |
| 2 | France | 3 | 2 | 0 | 1 | 7 | 4 | +3 | 6 | Advance to knockout stage |
| 3 | Nigeria | 3 | 1 | 0 | 2 | 1 | 2 | −1 | 3 | |
| 4 | Canada | 3 | 0 | 0 | 3 | 1 | 7 | −6 | 0 | |

Source: FIFA
Rules for classification: Group stage tiebreakers
(H) Hosts
26 June 2011
18:00

| Germany | 2–1 | Canada |
|---|---|---|
| Garefrekes 10'; Okoyino da Mbabi 42' | Report | Sinclair 82' |

Olympiastadion, Berlin
Attendance: 73,680
Referee: Jacqui Melksham (Australia)
30 June 2011
18:00

| Canada | 0–4 | France |
|---|---|---|
| | Report | Thiney 24', 60'; Abily 66'; Thomis 83' |

Ruhrstadion, Bochum
Attendance: 16,591
Referee: Etsuko Fukano (Japan)
5 July 2011
20:45

| Canada | 0–1 | Nigeria |
|---|---|---|
| | Report | Nkwocha 73' |

Rudolf-Harbig-Stadion, Dresden
Attendance: 13,638
Referee: Finau Vulivuli (Fiji)

== 2015 FIFA Women's World Cup ==
=== Group A ===
| Pos | Team | Pld | W | D | L | GF | GA | GD | Pts | Qualification |
|---|---|---|---|---|---|---|---|---|---|---|
| 1 | Canada (H) | 3 | 1 | 2 | 0 | 2 | 1 | +1 | 5 | Advance to knockout stage |
| 2 | China | 3 | 1 | 1 | 1 | 3 | 3 | 0 | 4 | Advance to knockout stage |
| 3 | Netherlands | 3 | 1 | 1 | 1 | 2 | 2 | 0 | 4 | Advance to knockout stage |
| 4 | New Zealand | 3 | 0 | 2 | 1 | 2 | 3 | −1 | 2 | |

Source: FIFA
Rules for classification: Group stage tiebreakers
(H) Hosts
6 June 2015
16:00 MDT (UTC−6)

| Canada | 1–0 | China |
|---|---|---|
| Sinclair 90+2' (pen.) | Report |

Commonwealth Stadium, Edmonton
Attendance: 53,058
Referee: Kateryna Monzul (Ukraine)
11 June 2015
19:00 MDT (UTC−6)

| Canada | 0–0 | New Zealand |
|---|---|---|
| | Report |

Commonwealth Stadium, Edmonton
Attendance: 35,544
Referee: Bibiana Steinhaus (Germany)
15 June 2015
19:30 EDT (UTC−4)

| Netherlands | 1–1 | Canada |
|---|---|---|
| Van de Ven 87' | Report | Lawrence 10' |

Olympic Stadium, Montreal
Attendance: 45,420
Referee: Ri Hyang-ok (North Korea)

=== Round of 16 ===
21 June 2015
16:30 PDT (UTC−7)

| Canada | 1–0 | Switzerland |
|---|---|---|
| Bélanger 52' | Report |

BC Place, Vancouver
Attendance: 53,855
Referee: Anna-Marie Keighley (New Zealand)

=== Quarterfinals ===
27 June 2015
16:30 PDT (UTC−7)

| England | 2–1 | Canada |
|---|---|---|
| Taylor 11'; Bronze 14' | Report | Sinclair 42' |

BC Place, Vancouver
Attendance: 54,027
Referee: Claudia Umpiérrez (Uruguay)

== 2019 FIFA Women's World Cup ==
=== Group E ===
| Pos | Team | Pld | W | D | L | GF | GA | GD | Pts | Qualification |
|---|---|---|---|---|---|---|---|---|---|---|
| 1 | Netherlands | 3 | 3 | 0 | 0 | 6 | 2 | +4 | 9 | Advance to knockout stage |
| 2 | Canada | 3 | 2 | 0 | 1 | 4 | 2 | +2 | 6 | Advance to knockout stage |
| 3 | Cameroon | 3 | 1 | 0 | 2 | 3 | 5 | −2 | 3 | Advance to knockout stage |
| 4 | New Zealand | 3 | 0 | 0 | 3 | 1 | 5 | −4 | 0 | |

Source: FIFA
Rules for classification: Group stage tiebreakers
10 June 2019
21:00

| Canada | 1–0 | Cameroon |
|---|---|---|
| Buchanan 45' | Report |

Stade de la Mosson, Montpellier
Attendance: 10,710
Referee: Ri Hyang-ok (North Korea)
15 June 2019
21:00

| Canada | 2–0 | New Zealand |
|---|---|---|
| Fleming 48'; Prince 79' | Report |

Stade des Alpes, Grenoble
Attendance: 14,856
Referee: Yoshimi Yamashita (Japan)
20 June 2019
18:00

| Netherlands | 2–1 | Canada |
|---|---|---|
| Dekker 54'; Beerensteyn 75' | Report | Sinclair 60' |

Stade Auguste-Delaune, Reims
Attendance: 19,277
Referee: Stéphanie Frappart (France)

=== Round of 16 ===
24 June 2019
21:00

| Sweden | 1–0 | Canada |
|---|---|---|
| Blackstenius 55' | Report |

Parc des Princes, Paris
Attendance: 38,078
Referee: Kate Jacewicz (Australia)

== 2023 FIFA Women's World Cup ==
=== Group B ===
| Pos | Team | Pld | W | D | L | GF | GA | GD | Pts | Qualification |
|---|---|---|---|---|---|---|---|---|---|---|
| 1 | Australia (H) | 3 | 2 | 0 | 1 | 7 | 3 | +4 | 6 | Advance to knockout stage |
| 2 | Nigeria | 3 | 1 | 2 | 0 | 3 | 2 | +1 | 5 | Advance to knockout stage |
| 3 | Canada | 3 | 1 | 1 | 1 | 2 | 5 | −3 | 4 | |
| 4 | Republic of Ireland | 3 | 0 | 1 | 2 | 1 | 3 | −2 | 1 | |

Source: FIFA
Rules for classification: Group stage tiebreakers
(H) Hosts
21 July 2023
12:30 UTC+10

| Nigeria | 0–0 | Canada |
|---|---|---|
| | Report |

Melbourne Rectangular Stadium, Melbourne
Attendance: 21,410
Referee: Lina Lehtovaara (Finland)

26 July 2023
20:00 UTC+8

| Canada | 2–1 | Republic of Ireland |
|---|---|---|
| Connolly 45+5' (o.g.); Leon 53' | Report | McCabe 4' |

Perth Rectangular Stadium, Perth
Attendance: 17,065
Referee: Laura Fortunato (Argentina)

31 July 2023
20:00 UTC+10

| Canada | 0–4 | Australia |
|---|---|---|
| | Report | Raso 9', 39'; Fowler 58'; Catley 90+4' (pen.) |

Melbourne Rectangular Stadium, Melbourne
Attendance: 27,706
Referee: Stéphanie Frappart (France)

== Goalscorers ==
| Player | Goals | 1995 | 1999 | 2003 | 2007 | 2011 | 2015 | 2019 | 2023 |
|---|---|---|---|---|---|---|---|---|---|
| Christine Sinclair | 10 | | | 3 | 3 | 1 | 2 | 1 | |
| Charmaine Hooper | 4 | | 2 | 2 | | | | | |
| Silvana Burtini | 3 | 2 | 1 | | | | | | |
| Christine Latham | 3 | | | 3 | | | | | |
| Geri Donnelly | 2 | 2 | | | | | | | |
| Kara Lang | 2 | | | 2 | | | | | |
| Helen Stoumbos | 1 | 1 | | | | | | | |
| Candace Chapman | 1 | | | | 1 | | | | |
| Martina Franko | 1 | | | | 1 | | | | |
| Sophie Schmidt | 1 | | | | 1 | | | | |
| Melissa Tancredi | 1 | | | | 1 | | | | |
| Josée Bélanger | 1 | | | | | | 1 | | |
| Ashley Lawrence | 1 | | | | | | 1 | | |
| Kadeisha Buchanan | 1 | | | | | | | 1 | |
| Jessie Fleming | 1 | | | | | | | 1 | |
| Nichelle Prince | 1 | | | | | | | 1 | |
| Adriana Leon | 1 | | | | | | | | 1 |
| Own goals | 1 | | | | | | | | 1 |
| Total | 36 | 5 | 3 | 10 | 7 | 1 | 4 | 4 | 2 |

== Head-to-head record ==
| Opponent | Pld | W | D | L | GF | GA | GD | Win % |
|---|---|---|---|---|---|---|---|---|
| Argentina | 1 | 1 | 0 | 0 | 3 | 0 | +3 | 100.00 |
| Australia | 2 | 0 | 1 | 1 | 2 | 6 | −4 | 0.00 |
| Cameroon | 1 | 1 | 0 | 0 | 1 | 0 | +1 | 100.00 |
| China | 2 | 2 | 0 | 0 | 2 | 0 | +2 | 100.00 |
| England | 2 | 0 | 0 | 2 | 3 | 5 | −2 | 0.00 |
| France | 1 | 0 | 0 | 1 | 0 | 4 | −4 | 0.00 |
| Germany | 2 | 0 | 0 | 2 | 2 | 6 | −4 | 0.00 |
| Ghana | 1 | 1 | 0 | 0 | 4 | 0 | +4 | 100.00 |
| Japan | 2 | 1 | 1 | 0 | 4 | 2 | +2 | 50.00 |
| Netherlands | 2 | 0 | 1 | 1 | 2 | 3 | −1 | 0.00 |
| New Zealand | 2 | 1 | 1 | 0 | 2 | 0 | +2 | 50.00 |
| Nigeria | 3 | 0 | 2 | 1 | 3 | 4 | −1 | 0.00 |
| Norway | 3 | 0 | 0 | 3 | 2 | 16 | −14 | 0.00 |
| Republic of Ireland | 1 | 1 | 0 | 0 | 2 | 1 | +1 | 100.00 |
| Russia | 1 | 0 | 0 | 1 | 1 | 4 | −3 | 0.00 |
| Sweden | 2 | 0 | 0 | 2 | 1 | 3 | −2 | 0.00 |
| Switzerland | 1 | 1 | 0 | 0 | 1 | 0 | +1 | 100.00 |
| United States | 1 | 0 | 0 | 1 | 1 | 3 | −2 | 0.00 |
| Total | 30 | 9 | 6 | 15 | 36 | 57 | −21 | 30.00 |
