= England at the FIFA Women's World Cup =

Performance of England in football tournament

England have participated six times at the FIFA Women's World Cup: in 1995, 2007, 2011, 2015, 2019, and 2023. They have reached the quarter-finals in each of their participation and the semi-finals three times, reaching the final in 2023.

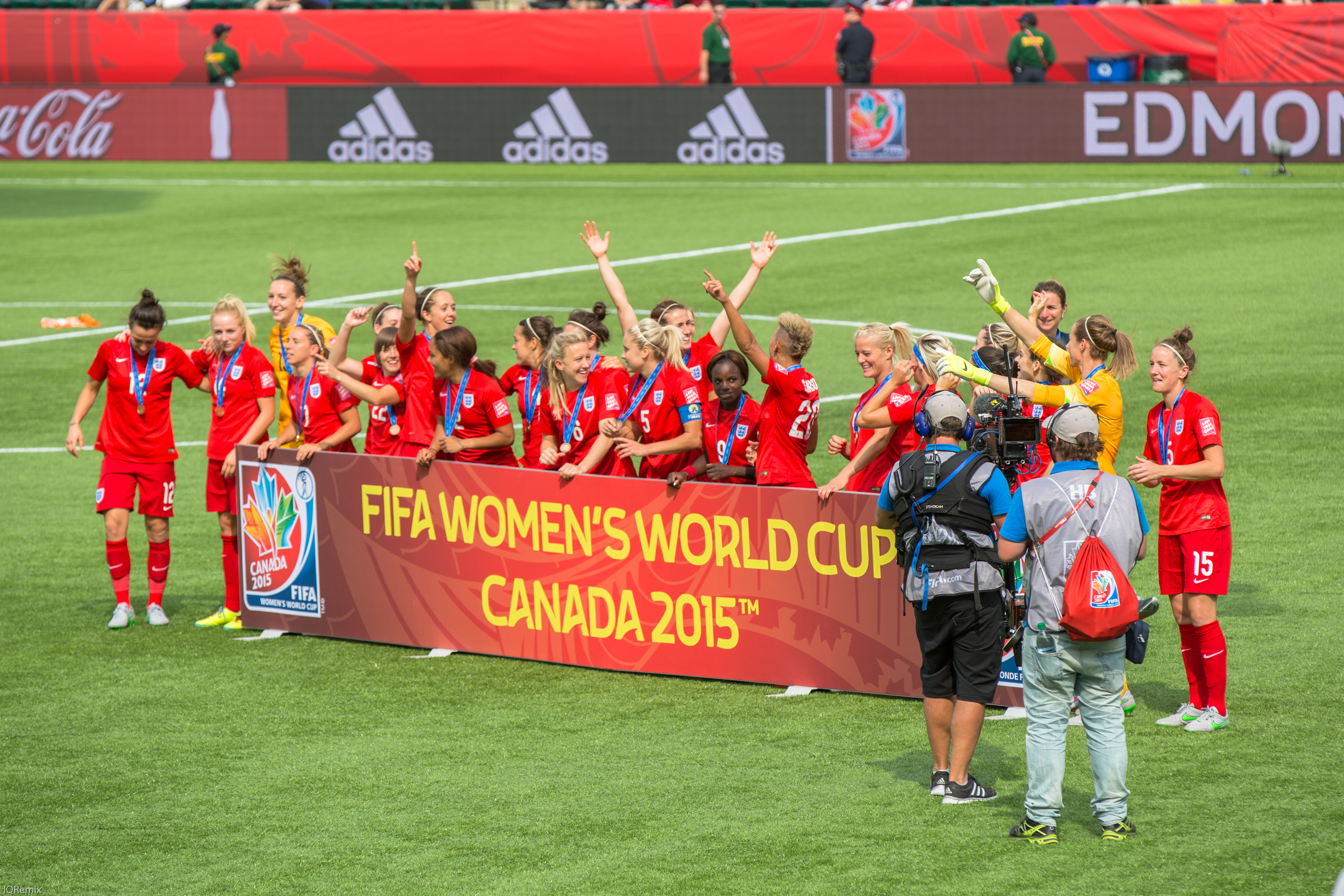
English women celebrate third place at the 2015 World Cup.

== 1991 World Cup ==
England did not qualify for the 1991 FIFA Women's World Cup. The European qualification tournament was the same as the European Championship Qualification. England finished second in their bracket at the group stage and qualified for the quarter-finals. In the quarter-final they lost twice to Germany: 1–4 at home, and 0–2 away. As a result, Germany qualified for the World Cup.

== 1995 World Cup ==
For the World Cup in Sweden, England qualified as the semi-finalist of the European Championship 1995. In the Qualification, England had four wins against Belgium and Slovenia and two goalless draws against Spain. In the quarter-finals, England prevailed with two 2-1 victories against Iceland and was thus qualified for the World Cup. In the semi-finals they lost to Germany 1–4 in the first leg and 1–2 in the second leg.

They defeated Canada 3–2 in their first World Cup match. Gillian Coultard scored in the 51st minute by a converted penalty the first World Cup goal for England. After increasing to 3–0 they conceded two late goals. A 2–0 win over Norway followed by a 3–2 victory over Nigeria put England in the quarter-finals as group winners. Here they again lost to Germany 0–3. The result would have been sufficient for England to have qualified for the first women's football tournament at the 1996 Olympic Games in which only the eight best teams of the World Cup could participate. However, because England is not eligible to start at the Olympic Games, Brazil participated as the ninth-best team.

=== Group B ===
Pos	Team	Pld	W	D	L	GF	GA	GD	Pts	Qualification
1	Norway	3	3	0	0	17	0	+17	9	Advance to knockout stage
2	England	3	2	0	1	6	6	0	6	Advance to knockout stage
3	Canada	3	0	1	2	5	13	−8	1	
4	Nigeria	3	0	1	2	5	14	−9	1	

Source: FIFA
6 June 1995
19:00

England	3–2	Canada
Coultard 51' (pen.), 85'; Spacey 76' (pen.)	Report	Stoumbos 87'; Donnelly 90+1'

Olympia, Helsingborg
Attendance: 655
Referee: Eva Ödlund (Sweden)

8 June 1995
19:00

Norway	2–0	England
Haugen 7'; Riise 37'	Report

Tingvalla IP, Karlstad
Attendance: 5,520
Referee: Eduardo Gamboa (Chile)

10 June 1995
16:00

Nigeria	2–3	England
Okoroafor 13'; Nwadike 74'	Report	Farley 10', 38'; Walker 27'

Tingvalla IP, Karlstad
Attendance: 1,843
Referee: Ingrid Jonsson (Sweden)

=== Quarter-finals ===
13 June 1995
20:15

Germany	3–0	England
Voss 41'; Meinert 55'; Mohr 82'	Report

Arosvallen, Västerås
Attendance: 2,317
Referee: Bente Skogvang (Norway)

== 1999 World Cup ==
For the 1999 FIFA Women's World Cup, for the first time, UEFA set up separate qualifiers. England met the two finalists from 1995, Norway and Germany, as well as the Netherlands. England won only the home game against the Dutch women 1–0 and lost all other games. Thus, England was eliminated at the group stage.

== 2003 World Cup ==
In the qualification for the 2003 FIFA Women's World Cup England again faced Germany and the Netherlands, as well as Portugal. With two wins and two draws, England qualified as a runner-up behind Germany (which qualified directly for the World Cup) for the relegation matches. There they first met Iceland and after a 2–2 in Iceland earned a 1–0 home win to make the relegation final against France. England lost both games 0–1, and thus did not qualify for the World Cup.

== 2007 World Cup ==
The 2007 FIFA Women's World Cup took place for the second time in China. In the qualification England met France, the Netherlands, Austria and Hungary. With six victories – including England's largest ever victory, a 13–0 defeat of Hungary – and two draws, England reached the World Cup for the second time.

In the first game of the finals, they met Japan and had a 2–1 lead in the 5th minute of stoppage time when Japan scored a late equalizer. The second game against Germany was a scoreless tie. In the last match against Argentina England won 6–1 and qualified for the quarter-finals, as Japan lost to Germany in a parallel game. In the quarter-finals they held the United States to a 0–0 tie for 50 minutes, but lost 3–0. Thus, England were eliminated in the quarter-finals, as in 1995. However, they were the only team to not lose to the eventual champion Germany. By making the quarter-finals England had actually secured qualification for the women's football tournament at the 2008 Summer Olympics, in which only the three best European teams of the World Cup could participate. However, as England still could not start at the Olympics, Sweden and Denmark, who were both eliminated in the preliminary round, played for this place, and Sweden won.

=== Group A ===
Pos	Team	Pld	W	D	L	GF	GA	GD	Pts	Qualification
1	Germany	3	2	1	0	13	0	+13	7	Advance to knockout stage
2	England	3	1	2	0	8	3	+5	5	Advance to knockout stage
3	Japan	3	1	1	1	3	4	−1	4	
4	Argentina	3	0	0	3	1	18	−17	0	

Source: FIFA
11 September 2007
20:00

Japan	2–2	England
Miyama 55', 90+5'	Report	K. Smith 81', 83'

Hongkou Football Stadium, Shanghai
Attendance: 27,146
Referee: Kari Seitz (United States)

14 September 2007
20:00

England	0–0	Germany
	Report

Hongkou Football Stadium, Shanghai
Attendance: 27,730
Referee: Jenny Palmqvist (Sweden)

17 September 2007
20:00

England	6–1	Argentina
González 9' (o.g.); J. Scott 10'; Williams 50' (pen.); K. Smith 64', 77'; Exley 90' (pen.)	Report	González 60'

Chengdu Sports Centre Stadium, Chengdu
Attendance: 30,730
Referee: Dianne Ferreira-James (Guyana)

=== Quarter-finals ===
22 September 2007
20:00

United States	3–0	England
Wambach 48'; Boxx 57'; Lilly 60'	Report

Tianjin Olympic Center Stadium, Tianjin
Attendance: 29,586
Referee: Jenny Palmqvist (Sweden)

== 2011 World Cup ==
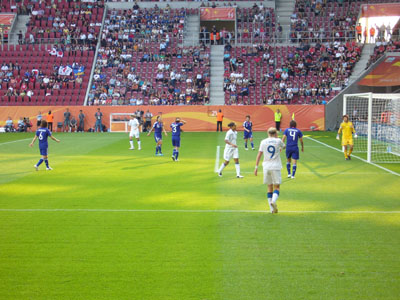
Scene from the game against Japan

For the 2011 FIFA Women's World Cup in Germany qualifying, England earned seven wins and a draw playing against Spain, Austria, Turkey and Malta for the playoffs of the group winners. In the playoffs, England defeated Switzerland 2–0 and 3–2 to earn a place in the World Cup.

In Germany, England was put into a group with Japan, New Zealand and Mexico. In the first game against Mexico, England tied 1:1. England defeated New Zealand 2-1 and Japan 2–0 to take England's first ever group victory at a World Cup. In the quarter-finals England played France. England took the lead in the 59th minute after a scoreless first half, but France equalized two minutes before the end of regular time. In the ensuing overtime, neither team scored, leading to a penalty shoot-out. Although the first French shooter failed and the first three English women were successful, all other French women scored and the last two English women, Claire Rafferty and captain Faye White, did not. England were the only team to have defeated the eventual champion Japan.

=== Group B ===
Pos	Team	Pld	W	D	L	GF	GA	GD	Pts	Qualification
1	England	3	2	1	0	5	2	+3	7	Advance to knockout stage
2	Japan	3	2	0	1	6	3	+3	6	Advance to knockout stage
3	Mexico	3	0	2	1	3	7	−4	2	
4	New Zealand	3	0	1	2	4	6	−2	1	

Source: FIFA
27 June 2011
18:00

Mexico	1–1	England
Ocampo 33'	Report	Williams 21'

Volkswagen Arena, Wolfsburg
Attendance: 18,702
Referee: Silvia Reyes (Peru)

1 July 2011
18:15

New Zealand	1–2	England
Gregorius 18'	Report	J. Scott 63'; Clarke 81'

Rudolf-Harbig-Stadion, Dresden
Attendance: 19,110
Referee: Thérèse Neguel (Cameroon)

5 July 2011
18:15

England	2–0	Japan
E. White 15'; Yankey 66'	Report

Impuls Arena, Augsburg
Attendance: 20,777
Referee: Carol Anne Chenard (Canada)

=== Quarter-finals ===
9 July 2011
18:00

England	1–1 (a.e.t.)	France
J. Scott 59'	Report	Bussaglia 88'
Penalties
Smith (penalty scored); Carney (penalty scored); Stoney (penalty scored); Rafferty (penalty missed); F. White (penalty missed)	3–4	(penalty missed) Abily; (penalty scored) Bussaglia; (penalty scored) Thiney; (penalty scored) Bompastor; (penalty scored) Le Sommer

BayArena, Leverkusen
Attendance: 26,395
Referee: Jenny Palmqvist (Sweden)

== 2015 World Cup ==
In the qualification for the 2015 FIFA Women's World Cup, England prevailed again. Their group included Ukraine, Wales, Turkey, Belarus and Montenegro. England won all 10 games to qualify.

England was assigned to Group F with France, Colombia and, like four years earlier, Mexico.

In a close game, they lost 1–0 to France, but followed that with four straight 2–1 wins. First against Mexico, then against Colombia with which they qualified as a runner-up for the knockout round, and then in the first-round playoff match against Norway, thus for the first time winning in a knockout game at the World Cup. In the quarter-finals, where England had never before won, they met host Canada and prevailed 2–1. They thus made the semi-finals for the first time, where they met the defending champion, Japan. England lost with an own goal in injury time, but won the match for third place against Germany for their highest ever finish.

=== Group F ===
Pos	Team	Pld	W	D	L	GF	GA	GD	Pts	Qualification
1	France	3	2	0	1	6	2	+4	6	Advance to knockout stage
2	England	3	2	0	1	4	3	+1	6	Advance to knockout stage
3	Colombia	3	1	1	1	4	3	+1	4	Advance to knockout stage
4	Mexico	3	0	1	2	2	8	−6	1	

Source: FIFA
9 June 2015
14:00 ADT (UTC−3)

France	1–0	England
Le Sommer 29'	Report

Moncton Stadium, Moncton
Attendance: 11,686
Referee: Efthalia Mitsi (Greece)

13 June 2015
17:00 ADT (UTC−3)

England	2–1	Mexico
Kirby 71'; Carney 82'	Report	Ibarra 90+1'

Moncton Stadium, Moncton
Attendance: 13,138
Referee: Anna-Marie Keighley (New Zealand)

17 June 2015
16:00 EDT (UTC−4)

England	2–1	Colombia
Carney 15'; Williams 38' (pen.)	Report	Andrade 90+4'

Olympic Stadium, Montreal
Attendance: 13,862
Referee: Carol Anne Chenard (Canada)

=== Round of 16 ===
22 June 2015
17:00 EDT (UTC−4)

Norway	1–2	England
Gulbrandsen 54'	Report	Houghton 61'; Bronze 76'

TD Place Stadium, Ottawa
Attendance: 19,829
Referee: Esther Staubli (Switzerland)

=== Quarter-finals ===
27 June 2015
16:30 PDT (UTC−7)

England	2–1	Canada
Taylor 11'; Bronze 14'	Report	Sinclair 42'

BC Place, Vancouver
Attendance: 54,027
Referee: Claudia Umpiérrez (Uruguay)

=== Semi-finals ===
1 July 2015
17:00 MDT (UTC−6)

Japan	2–1	England
Miyama 33' (pen.); Bassett 90+2' (o.g.)	Report	Williams 40' (pen.)

Commonwealth Stadium, Edmonton
Attendance: 31,467
Referee: Anna-Marie Keighley (New Zealand)

=== Third place play-off ===
4 July 2015
14:00 MDT (UTC−6)

Germany	0–1 (a.e.t.)	England
	Report	Williams 108' (pen.)

Commonwealth Stadium, Edmonton
Attendance: 21,483
Referee: Ri Hyang-ok (North Korea)

== 2019 World Cup ==
In the qualification for the 2019 FIFA Women's World Cup in Europe, England met Wales, Russia, Bosnia and Herzegovina and, for the first time, Kazakhstan. England only earned a point in the home game against Wales in a goalless draw. Crucial for the qualification then was a 3–0 victory in front of a record 5,053 spectators against Wales on the penultimate match day.

England had started their qualifications under Mark Sampson, who led them to third place in 2015 and the semi-finals at the European Championship in 2017. In September 2017, he was released after the first game due to various allegations. Mo Marley initially coached the team until former England international Phil Neville took over as coach in January 2018.

At the World Cup, the first game was against Scotland, which England won 2–1. Argentina and Japan followed, with a 1–0 result against Argentina and 2–0 against Japan, making England group winners. In the knockout rounds, England won 3–0 against Cameroon, then won against Norway in the quarter-finals, with Ellen White scoring her sixth World Cup goal. In the semi-final White scored again, but the team lost 1–2 to the United States. It was the first FIFA Women's World Cup in full shown on BBC. The previous times BBC aired the World Cup, they mostly aired England's games.

=== Group D ===
Pos	Team	Pld	W	D	L	GF	GA	GD	Pts	Qualification
1	England	3	3	0	0	5	1	+4	9	Advance to knockout stage
2	Japan	3	1	1	1	2	3	−1	4	Advance to knockout stage
3	Argentina	3	0	2	1	3	4	−1	2	
4	Scotland	3	0	1	2	5	7	−2	1	

Source: FIFA
9 June 2019
18:00

England	2–1	Scotland
Parris 14' (pen.); White 40'	Report	Emslie 79'

Allianz Riviera, Nice
Attendance: 13,188
Referee: Jana Adámková (Czech Republic)

14 June 2019
21:00

England	1–0	Argentina
Taylor 62'	Report

Stade Océane, Le Havre
Attendance: 20,294
Referee: Qin Liang (China PR)

19 June 2019
21:00

Japan	0–2	England
	Report	White 14', 84'

Allianz Riviera, Nice
Attendance: 14,319
Referee: Claudia Umpiérrez (Uruguay)

=== Round of 16 ===
23 June 2019
17:30

England	3–0	Cameroon
Houghton 14'; White 45+4'; Greenwood 58'	Report

Stade du Hainaut, Valenciennes
Attendance: 20,148
Referee: Qin Liang (China PR)

=== Quarter-finals ===
27 June 2019
21:00

Norway	0–3	England
	Report	Scott 3'; White 40'; Bronze 57'

Stade Océane, Le Havre
Attendance: 21,111
Referee: Lucila Venegas (Mexico)

=== Semi-finals ===
2 July 2019
21:00

England	1–2	United States
White 19'	Report	Press 10'; Morgan 31'

Parc Olympique Lyonnais, Décines-Charpieu
Attendance: 53,512
Referee: Edina Alves Batista (Brazil)

=== Third place play-off ===
6 July 2019
17:00

England	1–2	Sweden
Kirby 31'	Report	Asllani 11'; Jakobsson 22'

Allianz Riviera, Nice
Attendance: 20,316
Referee: Anastasia Pustovoitova (Russia)

== 2023 World Cup ==
The 2023 FIFA Women's World Cup is the ninth edition of the FIFA Women's World Cup. The tournament is jointly hosted by Australia and New Zealand, and is taking place from 20 July 2023 to 20 August 2023.

England were drawn into Group D along with Haiti, Denmark and China.

England played their first group stage match against Haiti on 22 July 2023. They won the match 1–0 thanks to a 29th-minute penalty from Georgia Stanway; her original attempt was saved by the goalkeeper, but the penalty was ordered to be retaken after the VAR determined the Haiti goalkeeper had come off her line prior to the kick.

=== Group D ===
Pos	Team	Pld	W	D	L	GF	GA	GD	Pts	Qualification
1	England	3	3	0	0	8	1	+7	9	Advance to knockout stage
2	Denmark	3	2	0	1	3	1	+2	6	Advance to knockout stage
3	China	3	1	0	2	2	7	−5	3	
4	Haiti	3	0	0	3	0	4	−4	0	

Source: FIFA
Rules for classification: Group stage tiebreakers
22 July 2023
19:30 UTC+10

England	1–0	Haiti
Stanway 29' (pen.)	Report

Lang Park, Brisbane
Attendance: 44,369
Referee: Emikar Calderas (Venezuela)

28 July 2023
18:30 UTC+10

England	1–0	Denmark
James 6'	Report

Sydney Football Stadium, Sydney
Attendance: 40,439
Referee: Tess Olofsson (Sweden)

1 August 2023
20:30 UTC+9:30

China	1–6	England
Wang Shuang 57' (pen.)	Report	Russo 4'; Hemp 26'; James 41', 65'; Kelly 77'; Daly 84'

Hindmarsh Stadium, Adelaide
Attendance: 13,497
Referee: Casey Reibelt (Australia)

=== Round of 16 ===
7 August 2023
17:30 UTC+10

England	0–0 (a.e.t.)	Nigeria
	Report
Penalties
Stanway (penalty missed); England (penalty scored); Daly (penalty scored); Greenwood (penalty scored); Kelly (penalty scored)	4–2	(penalty missed) Oparanozie; (penalty missed) Alozie; (penalty scored) Ajibade; (penalty scored) Ucheibe

Lang Park, Brisbane
Attendance: 49,461
Referee: Melissa Borjas (Honduras)

=== Quarter-finals ===
12 August 2023
20:30 UTC+10

England	2–1	Colombia
Hemp 45+7'; Russo 63'	Report	Santos 44'

Stadium Australia, Sydney
Attendance: 75,784
Referee: Ekaterina Koroleva (United States)

=== Semi-finals ===
16 August 2023
20:00 UTC+10

Australia	1–3	England
Kerr 63'	Report	Toone 36'; Hemp 71'; Russo 86'

Stadium Australia, Sydney
Attendance: 75,784
Referee: Tori Penso (United States)

=== Final ===
20 August 2023
20:00 UTC+10

Spain	1–0	England
Carmona 29'	Report

Stadium Australia, Sydney
Attendance: 75,784
Referee: Tori Penso (United States)

== 2035 World Cup ==
The 2035 FIFA Women's World Cup is set to be the twelfth edition of the FIFA Women's World Cup The tournament will be jointly hosted by England, Northern Ireland, Scotland and Wales (United Kingdom). England will make their seventh appearance and have earned an automatic qualification as co-host.

== World Cup record ==
World Cup finals
Year	Result	GP	W	D*	L	GF	GA	GD
(China) 1991	Did not qualify							
(Sweden) 1995	Quarter-finals	4	2	0	2	6	9	−3
(United States) 1999	Did not qualify							
(United States) 2003	Did not qualify							
(China) 2007	Quarter-finals	4	1	2	1	8	6	+2
(Germany) 2011	Quarter-finals	4	2	2	0	6	3	+3
(Canada) 2015	Third place	7	5	0	2	10	7	+3
(France) 2019	Fourth place	7	5	0	2	13	5	+8
(Australia) (New Zealand) 2023	Runners-up	7	5	1	1	13	4	+9
(Brazil) 2027	To be determined							
(Costa Rica) (Jamaica) (Mexico) (United States) 2031	To be determined							
(United Kingdom) 2035	Qualified as co-host							
Total	7/12	33	20	5	8	56	34	+22

*Draws include knockout matches decided by penalty shoot-outs.

== Head-to-head record ==
Opponent	Pld	W	D	L	GF	GA	GD	Win %
Argentina	2	2	0	0	7	1	+6	100.00
Australia	1	1	0	0	3	1	+2	100.00
Cameroon	1	1	0	0	3	0	+3	100.00
Canada	2	2	0	0	5	3	+2	100.00
China	1	1	0	0	6	1	+5	100.00
Colombia	2	2	0	0	4	2	+2	100.00
Denmark	1	1	0	0	1	0	+1	100.00
France	2	0	1	1	1	2	−1	0.00
Germany	3	1	1	1	1	3	−2	33.33
Haiti	1	1	0	0	1	0	+1	100.00
Japan	4	2	1	1	7	4	+3	50.00
Mexico	2	1	1	0	3	2	+1	50.00
New Zealand	1	1	0	0	2	1	+1	100.00
Nigeria	2	1	1	0	3	2	+1	50.00
Norway	3	2	0	1	5	3	+2	66.67
Scotland	1	1	0	0	2	1	+1	100.00
Spain	1	0	0	1	0	1	−1	0.00
Sweden	1	0	0	1	1	2	−1	0.00
United States	2	0	0	2	1	5	−4	0.00
Total	33	20	5	8	56	34	+22	60.61

== Goalscorers ==
Player	Goals	1995	2007	2011	2015	2019	2023
Ellen White	7			1		6	
Fara Williams	5		1	1	3		
Kelly Smith	4		4				
Jill Scott	4		1	2		1	
Lucy Bronze	3				2	1	
Lauren Hemp	3						3
Lauren James	3						3
Alessia Russo	3						3
Karen Carney	2				2		
Gillian Coultard	2	2					
Karen Farley	2	2					
Jodie Taylor	2				1	1	
Steph Houghton	2				1	1	
Fran Kirby	2				1	1	
Jessica Clarke	1			1			
Vicky Exley	1		1				
Marieanne Spacey	1	1					
Nikita Parris	1					1	
Alex Greenwood	1					1	
Karen Walker	1	1					
Rachel Yankey	1			1			
Georgia Stanway	1						1
Chloe Kelly	1						1
Rachel Daly	1						1
Ella Toone	1						1
Own goals	1		1				
Total	56	6	8	6	10	13	13

Own goals scored for opponents

- Laura Bassett (scored for Japan in 2015)

== See also ==
- England women's national football team
- England at the UEFA Women's Championship
