= 2011 FIFA Women's World Cup Group A =

Football tournament group stage

Group A of the 2011 FIFA Women's World Cup consisted of the teams from Germany, Canada, Nigeria and France. The games were played on 26 June, 30 June and 5 July 2011. The top two teams advanced to the knockout stage.

== Standings ==
Pos	Team	Pld	W	D	L	GF	GA	GD	Pts	Qualification
1	Germany (H)	3	3	0	0	7	3	+4	9	Advance to knockout stage
2	France	3	2	0	1	7	4	+3	6	Advance to knockout stage
3	Nigeria	3	1	0	2	1	2	−1	3	
4	Canada	3	0	0	3	1	7	−6	0	

Source: FIFA
Rules for classification: Group stage tiebreakers
(H) Hosts

== Matches ==
=== Nigeria vs France ===
26 June 2011
15:00

Nigeria	0–1	France
	Report	Delie 56'

Rhein-Neckar-Arena, Sinsheim
Attendance: 25,475
Referee: Kari Seitz (United States)

Nigeria	France

NIGERIA:
GK	1	Precious Dede (c)
RB	14	Faith Ikidi	(substituted off) 34'
CB	3	Osinachi Ohale
CB	5	Onome Ebi
LB	6	Helen Ukaonu
CM	11	Glory Iroka
CM	10	Rita Chikwelu
RW	7	Stella Mbachu
AM	4	Perpetua Nkwocha
LW	8	Ebere Orji	(substituted off) 78'
CF	9	Desire Oparanozie	(substituted off) 66'
Substitutions:
DF	15	Josephine Chukwunonye	(substituted in) 34'
FW	12	Sarah Michael	(substituted in) 66'
FW	19	Uchechi Sunday	(substituted in) 78'
Manager:
Uche Eucharia

FRANCE:
GK	16	Bérangère Sapowicz
RB	2	Wendie Renard	(substituted off) 69'
CB	4	Laura Georges
CB	5	Ophélie Meilleroux
LB	8	Sonia Bompastor
DM	6	Sandrine Soubeyrand (c)	(substituted off) 46'
CM	10	Camille Abily
CM	15	Élise Bussaglia
RW	17	Gaëtane Thiney	(substituted off) 57'
LW	14	Louisa Necib
CF	18	Marie-Laure Delie
Substitutions:
FW	9	Eugénie Le Sommer	(substituted in) 46'
FW	12	Élodie Thomis	(substituted in) 57'
DF	11	Laure Lepailleur	(substituted in) 69'
Manager:
Bruno Bini

Player of the Match:
Louisa Necib (France)

Assistant referees:
Marlene Duffy (United States)
Veronica Perez (United States)
Fourth official:
Cha Sung-mi (South Korea)

=== Germany vs Canada ===
26 June 2011
18:00

Germany	2–1	Canada
Garefrekes 10'; Okoyino da Mbabi 42'	Report	Sinclair 82'

Olympiastadion, Berlin
Attendance: 73,680
Referee: Jacqui Melksham (Australia)

Germany	Canada

GERMANY:
GK	1	Nadine Angerer
RB	10	Linda Bresonik
CB	5	Annike Krahn	(yellow card) 90'
CB	3	Saskia Bartusiak
LB	4	Babett Peter
CM	14	Kim Kulig
CM	6	Simone Laudehr	(yellow card) 81'
RW	18	Kerstin Garefrekes
AM	13	Célia Okoyino da Mbabi		(substituted off) 65'
LW	7	Melanie Behringer		(substituted off) 71'
CF	9	Birgit Prinz (c)		(substituted off) 56'
Substitutions:
FW	11	Alexandra Popp		(substituted in) 56'
FW	8	Inka Grings		(substituted in) 65'
MF	19	Fatmire Bajramaj		(substituted in) 71'
Manager:
Silvia Neid

CANADA:
GK	18	Erin McLeod
RB	7	Rhian Wilkinson
CB	9	Candace Chapman
CB	2	Emily Zurrer
LB	20	Marie-Ève Nault	(substituted off) 46'
DM	6	Kaylyn Kyle	(substituted off) 46'
CM	8	Diana Matheson
CM	13	Sophie Schmidt
RW	16	Jonelle Filigno
LW	14	Melissa Tancredi	(substituted off) 80'
CF	12	Christine Sinclair (c)
Substitutions:
MF	3	Kelly Parker	(substituted in) 46'
DF	5	Robyn Gayle	(substituted in) 46'
DF	17	Brittany Timko	(substituted in) 80'
Manager:
(Italy) Carolina Morace

Player of the Match:
Kerstin Garefrekes (Germany)

Assistant referees:
Allyson Flynn (Australia)
Sarah Ho (Australia)
Fourth official:
Etsuko Fukano (Japan)

=== Canada vs France ===
30 June 2011
18:00

Canada	0–4	France
	Report	Thiney 24', 60'; Abily 66'; Thomis 83'

Ruhrstadion, Bochum
Attendance: 16,591
Referee: Etsuko Fukano (Japan)

Canada	France

CANADA:
GK	18	Erin McLeod
RB	7	Rhian Wilkinson
CB	9	Candace Chapman
CB	2	Emily Zurrer
LB	17	Brittany Timko		(substituted off) 77'
DM	6	Kaylyn Kyle		(substituted off) 60'
CM	8	Diana Matheson	(yellow card) 52'
CM	13	Sophie Schmidt
RW	16	Jonelle Filigno
LW	15	Christina Julien		(substituted off) 60'
CF	12	Christine Sinclair (c)
Substitutions:
MF	11	Desiree Scott		(substituted in) 60'
FW	14	Melissa Tancredi		(substituted in) 60'
MF	19	Chelsea Stewart		(substituted in) 77'
Manager:
(Italy) Carolina Morace

FRANCE:
GK	16	Bérangère Sapowicz
RB	11	Laure Lepailleur
CB	4	Laura Georges
CB	20	Sabrina Viguier
LB	8	Sonia Bompastor	(yellow card) 37'
CM	6	Sandrine Soubeyrand (c)
CM	15	Élise Bussaglia
RW	10	Camille Abily		(substituted off) 82'
AM	14	Louisa Necib
LW	17	Gaëtane Thiney		(substituted off) 79'
CF	18	Marie-Laure Delie		(substituted off) 74'
Substitutions:
FW	12	Élodie Thomis		(substituted in) 74'
DF	3	Laure Boulleau		(substituted in) 79'
FW	9	Eugénie Le Sommer		(substituted in) 82'
Manager:
Bruno Bini

Player of the Match:
Gaëtane Thiney (France)

Assistant referees:
Saori Takahashi (Japan)
Zhang Lingling (China)
Fourth official:
Kateryna Monzul (Ukraine)

=== Germany vs Nigeria ===
30 June 2011
20:45

Germany	1–0	Nigeria
Laudehr 54'	Report

Waldstadion, Frankfurt
Attendance: 48,817
Referee: Cha Sung-mi (South Korea)

Germany	Nigeria

GERMANY:
GK	1	Nadine Angerer
RB	10	Linda Bresonik
CB	5	Annike Krahn
CB	3	Saskia Bartusiak
LB	4	Babett Peter
CM	14	Kim Kulig	(yellow card) 74'
CM	6	Simone Laudehr
RW	18	Kerstin Garefrekes
AM	13	Célia Okoyino da Mbabi		(substituted off) 87'
LW	7	Melanie Behringer		(substituted off) 31'
CF	9	Birgit Prinz (c)		(substituted off) 53'
Substitutions:
FW	11	Alexandra Popp		(substituted in) 31'
FW	8	Inka Grings		(substituted in) 53'
MF	19	Fatmire Bajramaj		(substituted in) 87'
Manager:
Silvia Neid

NIGERIA:
GK	1	Precious Dede (c)
RB	14	Faith Ikidi
CB	3	Osinachi Ohale	(yellow card) 51'
CB	5	Onome Ebi		(substituted off) 85'
LB	6	Helen Ukaonu
RM	7	Stella Mbachu
CM	4	Perpetua Nkwocha
CM	10	Rita Chikwelu
LM	8	Ebere Orji		(substituted off) 63'
CF	9	Desire Oparanozie
CF	12	Sarah Michael		(substituted off) 70'
Substitutions:
FW	20	Amenze Aighewi		(substituted in) 63'
FW	19	Uchechi Sunday		(substituted in) 70'
FW	17	Francisca Ordega		(substituted in) 85'
Manager:
Uche Eucharia

Player of the Match:
Annike Krahn (Germany)

Assistant referees:
Shamsuri Widiya (Malaysia)
Kim Kyoung Min (South Korea)
Fourth official:
Silvia Reyes (Peru)

=== France vs Germany ===
5 July 2011
20:45

France	2–4	Germany
Delie 56'; Georges 72'	Report	Garefrekes 25'; Grings 32', 68' (pen.); Okoyino da Mbabi 89'

Borussia-Park, Mönchengladbach
Attendance: 45,867
Referee: Kirsi Heikkinen (Finland)

France	Germany

FRANCE:
GK	16	Bérangère Sapowicz	(red card) 65'
RB	11	Laure Lepailleur
CB	4	Laura Georges	(yellow card) 41'
CB	2	Wendie Renard	(yellow card) 59'
LB	3	Laure Boulleau
CM	6	Sandrine Soubeyrand (c)
CM	15	Élise Bussaglia	(yellow card) 40'
RW	9	Eugénie Le Sommer		(substituted off) 68'
AM	14	Louisa Necib		(substituted off) 46'
LW	17	Gaëtane Thiney
CF	12	Élodie Thomis		(substituted off) 46'
Substitutions:
MF	10	Camille Abily		(substituted in) 46'
FW	18	Marie-Laure Delie		(substituted in) 46'
GK	1	Céline Deville		(substituted in) 68'
Manager:
Bruno Bini

GERMANY:
GK	1	Nadine Angerer
RB	2	Bianca Schmidt
CB	5	Annike Krahn		(substituted off) 78'
CB	3	Saskia Bartusiak
LB	4	Babett Peter
CM	6	Simone Laudehr		(substituted off) 46'
CM	20	Lena Goeßling	(yellow card) 17'
RW	18	Kerstin Garefrekes (c)
AM	13	Célia Okoyino da Mbabi
LW	19	Fatmire Bajramaj	(yellow card) 82'
CF	8	Inka Grings
Substitutions:
MF	17	Ariane Hingst		(substituted in) 46'
FW	11	Alexandra Popp		(substituted in) 78'
Manager:
Silvia Neid

Player of the Match:
Inka Grings (Germany)

Assistant referees:
Anu Jokela (Finland)
Tonja Paavola (Finland)
Fourth official:
Dagmar Damková (Czech Republic)

=== Canada vs Nigeria ===
At 22:13 CEST, in the 72nd minute, the match was interrupted due to a power outage of the stadium's floodlights. The match resumed at 22:24 CEST. Though the elapsed time was initially counted in the match report, FIFA later amended the minutes of the match events to exclude the stoppage of play caused by the power outage.

5 July 2011
20:45

Canada	0–1	Nigeria
	Report	Nkwocha 73'

Rudolf-Harbig-Stadion, Dresden
Attendance: 13,638
Referee: Finau Vulivuli (Fiji)

Canada	Nigeria

CANADA:
GK	1	Karina LeBlanc
RB	7	Rhian Wilkinson
CB	9	Candace Chapman
CB	2	Emily Zurrer
LB	20	Marie-Ève Nault
RM	8	Diana Matheson
CM	6	Kaylyn Kyle	(substituted off) 78'
LM	13	Sophie Schmidt
AM	16	Jonelle Filigno	(substituted off) 56'
AM	14	Melissa Tancredi	(substituted off) 84'
CF	12	Christine Sinclair (c)
Substitutions:
FW	15	Christina Julien	(substituted in) 56'
MF	11	Desiree Scott	(substituted in) 78'
FW	10	Jodi-Ann Robinson	(substituted in) 84'
Manager:
(Italy) Carolina Morace

NIGERIA:
GK	1	Precious Dede (c)
RB	14	Faith Ikidi
CB	3	Osinachi Ohale
CB	5	Onome Ebi	(yellow card) 59'
LB	6	Helen Ukaonu
CM	11	Glory Iroka
CM	10	Rita Chikwelu
RW	7	Stella Mbachu		(substituted off) 72'
LW	8	Ebere Orji		(substituted off) 54'
CF	9	Desire Oparanozie		(substituted off) 84'
CF	4	Perpetua Nkwocha
Substitutions:
MF	13	Ogonna Chukwudi		(substituted in) 54'
FW	17	Francisca Ordega		(substituted in) 72'
FW	19	Uchechi Sunday		(substituted in) 84'
Manager:
Uche Eucharia

Player of the Match:
Stella Mbachu (Nigeria)

Assistant referees:
Jacqui Stephenson (New Zealand)
Lata Tuifutuna (Tonga)
Fourth official:
Thalia Mitsi (Greece)

== See also ==
- Canada at the FIFA Women's World Cup
- France at the FIFA Women's World Cup
- Germany at the FIFA Women's World Cup
- Nigeria at the FIFA Women's World Cup
