= 2023 FIFA Women's World Cup Group B =

Football tournament teams

Group B of the 2023 FIFA Women's World Cup was one of eight groups that formed the opening round of the tournament with the matches played from 20 to 31 July 2023. The group consisted of hosts Australia, the Republic of Ireland, Nigeria and Canada. The top two teams, Australia and Nigeria, advanced to the round of 16.

Canada became the first reigning Olympic champions to be eliminated in the subsequent Women's World Cup group stage. A win against Canada ensured Australia avoided a first group stage elimination since 2003, and following the elimination of fellow hosts New Zealand, assured every Women's World Cup up to 2023 had a host country participating in the knockouts. Nigeria progressed to the knockout stage for only the third time in their ninth Women's World Cup.

== Teams ==
Draw position	Team	Pot	Confederation	Method of qualification	Date of qualification	Finals appearance	Last appearance	Previous best performance	FIFA Rankings	
Draw position	Team	Pot	Confederation	Method of qualification	Date of qualification	Finals appearance	Last appearance	Previous best performance	October 2022 (Note: The rankings of October 2022 were used for seeding for the final draw.)	June 2023
B1	Australia	1	AFC	Hosts	25 June 2020	8th	2019	Quarter-finals (2007, 2011, 2015)	13	10
B2	Republic of Ireland	3	UEFA	UEFA play-offs second-best ranked winners	11 October 2022	1st	—	Debut	24	22
B3	Nigeria	4	CAF	2022 Women's Africa Cup of Nations fourth place	14 July 2022	9th	2019	Quarter-finals (1999)	45	40
B4	Canada	2	CONCACAF	2022 CONCACAF W Championship runners-up	8 July 2022	8th	2019	Fourth place (2003)	7	7

== Standings ==
Pos	Team	Pld	W	D	L	GF	GA	GD	Pts	Qualification
1	Australia (H)	3	2	0	1	7	3	+4	6	Advance to knockout stage
2	Nigeria	3	1	2	0	3	2	+1	5	Advance to knockout stage
3	Canada	3	1	1	1	2	5	−3	4	
4	Republic of Ireland	3	0	1	2	1	3	−2	1	

Source: FIFA
Rules for classification: Group stage tiebreakers
(H) Hosts

In the round of 16:

- The winners of Group B, Australia, advanced to play the runners-up of Group D, Denmark.
- The runners-up of Group B, Nigeria, advanced to play the winners of Group D, England.

== Matches ==
All times listed are local.

=== Australia vs Republic of Ireland ===
The match was originally scheduled to take place at Sydney Football Stadium, Sydney. However, FIFA confirmed in late January 2023 that the match would be moved to Stadium Australia, Sydney, due to significant interest in tickets.

20 July 2023
20:00 UTC+10

Australia	1–0	Republic of Ireland
Catley 52' (pen.)	Report

Stadium Australia, Sydney
Attendance: 75,784
Referee: Edina Alves Batista (Brazil)

Australia	Republic of Ireland

GK	18	Mackenzie Arnold
RB	21	Ellie Carpenter
CB	15	Clare Hunt
CB	14	Alanna Kennedy
LB	7	Steph Catley (c)
RM	16	Hayley Raso
CM	19	Katrina Gorry
CM	23	Kyra Cooney-Cross
LM	5	Cortnee Vine	(substituted off) 75'
CF	9	Caitlin Foord
CF	11	Mary Fowler	(substituted off) 84'
Substitutions:
MF	10	Emily van Egmond	(substituted on) 75'
DF	4	Clare Polkinghorne	(substituted on) 84'
Manager:
(Sweden) Tony Gustavsson

GK	1	Courtney Brosnan
CB	5	Niamh Fahey
CB	4	Louise Quinn
CB	6	Megan Connolly
RM	14	Heather Payne
CM	10	Denise O'Sullivan	(yellow card) 42'
CM	8	Ruesha Littlejohn
LM	11	Katie McCabe (c)
RF	17	Sinead Farrelly		(substituted off) 63'
CF	18	Kyra Carusa		(substituted off) 87'
LF	20	Marissa Sheva		(substituted off) 63'
Substitutions:
MF	15	Lucy Quinn		(substituted on) 63'
FW	19	Abbie Larkin		(substituted on) 63'
DF	22	Isibeal Atkinson		(substituted on) 87'
Manager:
(Netherlands) Vera Pauw

Player of the Match:
Steph Catley (Australia)

Assistant referees:
Neuza Back (Brazil)
Leila Moreira da Cruz (Brazil)
Fourth official:
María Carvajal (Chile)
Video assistant referee:
Daiane Muniz dos Santos (Brazil)
Assistant video assistant referee:
Juan Soto (Venezuela)
Offside video assistant referee:
Mariana de Almeida (Argentina)

=== Nigeria vs Canada ===
21 July 2023
12:30 UTC+10

Nigeria	0–0	Canada
	Report

Melbourne Rectangular Stadium, Melbourne
Attendance: 21,410
Referee: Lina Lehtovaara (Finland)

Nigeria	Canada

GK	16	Chiamaka Nnadozie (c)
RB	22	Michelle Alozie
CB	3	Osinachi Ohale
CB	14	Oluwatosin Demehin	(yellow card) 54'
LB	2	Ashleigh Plumptre
DM	13	Deborah Abiodun	(red card) 90+8'
CM	7	Toni Payne
CM	10	Christy Ucheibe
RF	17	Francisca Ordega		(substituted off) 73'
CF	8	Asisat Oshoala		(substituted off) 90+1'
LF	6	Ifeoma Onumonu		(substituted off) 85'
Substitutions:
FW	12	Uchenna Kanu		(substituted on) 73'
FW	21	Esther Okoronkwo		(substituted on) 85'
MF	19	Jennifer Echegini		(substituted on) 90+1'
Manager:
(United States) Randy Waldrum

GK	1	Kailen Sheridan
RB	8	Jayde Riviere		(substituted off) 71'
CB	3	Kadeisha Buchanan
CB	14	Vanessa Gilles
LB	10	Ashley Lawrence	(yellow card) 74'
CM	5	Quinn
CM	7	Julia Grosso		(substituted off) 82'
RW	6	Deanne Rose		(substituted off) 46'
AM	12	Christine Sinclair (c)		(substituted off) 71'
LW	19	Adriana Leon		(substituted off) 64'
CF	9	Jordyn Huitema
Substitutions:
FW	20	Cloé Lacasse		(substituted on) 46'
FW	11	Evelyne Viens	(yellow card) 90+9'	(substituted on) 64'
DF	2	Allysha Chapman		(substituted on) 71'
MF	13	Sophie Schmidt		(substituted on) 71'
FW	15	Nichelle Prince		(substituted on) 82'
Manager:
(England) Bev Priestman

Player of the Match:
Chiamaka Nnadozie (Nigeria)

Assistant referees:
Chrysoula Kourompylia (Greece)
Karolin Kaivoja (Estonia)
Fourth official:
Iuliana Demetrescu (Romania)
Video assistant referee:
Pol van Boekel (Netherlands)
Assistant video assistant referee:
Abdulla Al-Marri (Qatar)
Offside video assistant referee:
Katrin Rafalski (Germany)

=== Canada vs Republic of Ireland ===
26 July 2023
20:00 UTC+8

Canada	2–1	Republic of Ireland
Connolly 45+5' (o.g.); Leon 53'	Report	McCabe 4'

Perth Rectangular Stadium, Perth
Attendance: 17,065
Referee: Laura Fortunato (Argentina)

Canada	Republic of Ireland

GK	1	Kailen Sheridan
RB	8	Jayde Riviere		(substituted off) 90+4'
CB	3	Kadeisha Buchanan	(yellow card) 36'	(substituted off) 46'
CB	14	Vanessa Gilles	(yellow card) 61'
LB	10	Ashley Lawrence
DM	5	Quinn
CM	17	Jessie Fleming (c)
CM	7	Julia Grosso		(substituted off) 46'
RF	19	Adriana Leon		(substituted off) 59'
CF	11	Evelyne Viens		(substituted off) 46'
LF	9	Jordyn Huitema
Substitutions:
DF	4	Shelina Zadorsky		(substituted on) 46'
FW	12	Christine Sinclair		(substituted on) 46'
MF	13	Sophie Schmidt		(substituted on) 46'
FW	20	Cloé Lacasse		(substituted on) 59'
DF	2	Allysha Chapman		(substituted on) 90+4'
Manager:
(England) Bev Priestman

GK	1	Courtney Brosnan
CB	5	Niamh Fahey
CB	4	Louise Quinn
CB	6	Megan Connolly
RM	13	Áine O'Gorman		(substituted off) 59'
CM	10	Denise O'Sullivan
CM	8	Ruesha Littlejohn		(substituted off) 65'
LM	11	Katie McCabe (c)	(yellow card) 90+8'
RF	15	Lucy Quinn		(substituted off) 46'
CF	18	Kyra Carusa		(substituted off) 65'
LF	17	Sinead Farrelly		(substituted off) 65'
Substitutions:
FW	19	Abbie Larkin		(substituted on) 46'
FW	20	Marissa Sheva		(substituted on) 59'
DF	22	Isibeal Atkinson		(substituted on) 65'
MF	12	Lily Agg		(substituted on) 65'
FW	9	Amber Barrett		(substituted on) 65'
Manager:
(Netherlands) Vera Pauw

Player of the Match:
Katie McCabe (Republic of Ireland)

Assistant referees:
Mariana de Almeida (Argentina)
Daiana Milone (Argentina)
Fourth official:
Akhona Makalima (South Africa)
Video assistant referee:
Alejandro Hernández Hernández (Spain)
Assistant video assistant referee:
Juan Martínez Munuera (Spain)
Offside video assistant referee:
Neuza Back (Brazil)

=== Australia vs Nigeria ===
27 July 2023
20:00 UTC+10

Australia	2–3	Nigeria
Van Egmond 45+1'; Kennedy 90+10'	Report	Kanu 45+6'; Ohale 65'; Oshoala 72'

Lang Park, Brisbane
Attendance: 49,156
Referee: Esther Staubli (Switzerland)

Australia	Nigeria

GK	18	Mackenzie Arnold
RB	21	Ellie Carpenter
CB	15	Clare Hunt
CB	14	Alanna Kennedy
LB	7	Steph Catley (c)
RM	16	Hayley Raso		(substituted off) 85'
CM	19	Katrina Gorry
CM	23	Kyra Cooney-Cross
LM	5	Cortnee Vine		(substituted off) 82'
CF	10	Emily van Egmond
CF	9	Caitlin Foord	(yellow card) 45+3'
Substitutions:
DF	4	Clare Polkinghorne		(substituted on) 82'
MF	8	Alex Chidiac		(substituted on) 85'
Manager:
(Sweden) Tony Gustavsson

GK	16	Chiamaka Nnadozie (c)
RB	22	Michelle Alozie	(yellow card) 21'
CB	3	Osinachi Ohale
CB	14	Oluwatosin Demehin
LB	2	Ashleigh Plumptre		(substituted off) 77'
CM	10	Christy Ucheibe
CM	18	Halimatu Ayinde		(substituted off) 76'
RW	15	Rasheedat Ajibade
AM	7	Toni Payne		(substituted off) 90'
LW	12	Uchenna Kanu		(substituted off) 63'
CF	6	Ifeoma Onumonu		(substituted off) 63'
Substitutions:
FW	8	Asisat Oshoala	(yellow card) 73'	(substituted on) 63'
FW	21	Esther Okoronkwo		(substituted on) 63'
MF	19	Jennifer Echegini		(substituted on) 76'
DF	4	Glory Ogbonna		(substituted on) 77'
DF	5	Onome Ebi		(substituted on) 90'
Manager:
(United States) Randy Waldrum

Player of the Match:
Osinachi Ohale (Nigeria)

Assistant referees:
Katrin Rafalski (Germany)
Susanne Küng (Switzerland)
Fourth official:
Lina Lehtovaara (Finland)
Video assistant referee:
Marco Fritz (Germany)
Assistant video assistant referee:
Pol van Boekel (Netherlands)
Offside video assistant referee:
Ella De Vries (Belgium)

=== Canada vs Australia ===
31 July 2023
20:00 UTC+10

Canada	0–4	Australia
	Report	Raso 9', 39'; Fowler 58'; Catley 90+4' (pen.)

Melbourne Rectangular Stadium, Melbourne
Attendance: 27,706
Referee: Stéphanie Frappart (France)

Canada	Australia

GK	1	Kailen Sheridan
RB	8	Jayde Riviere	(substituted off) 46'
CB	3	Kadeisha Buchanan
CB	14	Vanessa Gilles
LB	10	Ashley Lawrence
CM	5	Quinn	(substituted off) 77'
CM	7	Julia Grosso	(substituted off) 46'
RW	19	Adriana Leon	(substituted off) 64'
CM	17	Jessie Fleming
LW	9	Jordyn Huitema	(substituted off) 46'
CF	12	Christine Sinclair (c)	(substituted off) 46'
Substitutions:
DF	2	Allysha Chapman	(substituted on) 46'
FW	6	Deanne Rose	(substituted on) 46'
MF	13	Sophie Schmidt	(substituted on) 46'
FW	20	Cloé Lacasse	(substituted on) 46'
FW	11	Evelyne Viens	(substituted on) 64'
MF	23	Olivia Smith	(substituted on) 77'
Manager:
(England) Bev Priestman

GK	18	Mackenzie Arnold	(yellow card) 81'
RB	21	Ellie Carpenter
CB	15	Clare Hunt
CB	14	Alanna Kennedy
LB	7	Steph Catley (c)
RM	16	Hayley Raso		(substituted off) 75'
CM	19	Katrina Gorry		(substituted off) 90+6'
CM	23	Kyra Cooney-Cross
LM	9	Caitlin Foord
CF	10	Emily van Egmond	(yellow card) 68'	(substituted off) 84'
CF	11	Mary Fowler
Substitutions:
FW	5	Cortnee Vine		(substituted on) 75'
DF	4	Clare Polkinghorne		(substituted on) 84'
DF	22	Charlotte Grant		(substituted on) 90+6'
Manager:
(Sweden) Tony Gustavsson			(yellow card) 45+5'

Player of the Match:
Hayley Raso (Australia)

Assistant referees:
Manuela Nicolosi (France)
Elodie Coppola (France)
Fourth official:
Tess Olofsson (Sweden)
Video assistant referee:
Pol van Boekel (Netherlands)
Assistant video assistant referee:
Marco Fritz (Germany)
Offside video assistant referee:
Ella De Vries (Belgium)

=== Republic of Ireland vs Nigeria ===
31 July 2023
20:00 UTC+10

Republic of Ireland	0–0	Nigeria
	Report

Lang Park, Brisbane
Attendance: 24,884
Referee: Katia García (Mexico)

Republic of Ireland	Nigeria

GK	1	Courtney Brosnan
CB	5	Niamh Fahey		(substituted off) 90+5'
CB	4	Louise Quinn
CB	6	Megan Connolly
RM	14	Heather Payne		(substituted off) 83'
CM	12	Lily Agg		(substituted off) 83'
CM	8	Ruesha Littlejohn
LM	11	Katie McCabe (c)	(yellow card) 68'
RF	10	Denise O'Sullivan
CF	18	Kyra Carusa
LF	17	Sinead Farrelly
Substitutions:
FW	20	Marissa Sheva		(substituted on) 83'
FW	19	Abbie Larkin		(substituted on) 83'
DF	7	Diane Caldwell		(substituted on) 90+5'
Manager:
(Netherlands) Vera Pauw

GK	16	Chiamaka Nnadozie (c)
RB	22	Michelle Alozie
CB	3	Osinachi Ohale
CB	14	Oluwatosin Demehin	(substituted off) 83'
LB	2	Ashleigh Plumptre
CM	10	Christy Ucheibe
CM	18	Halimatu Ayinde
RW	15	Rasheedat Ajibade
AM	7	Toni Payne
LW	12	Uchenna Kanu	(substituted off) 67'
CF	8	Asisat Oshoala	(substituted off) 67'
Substitutions:
FW	11	Gift Monday	(substituted on) 67'
FW	6	Ifeoma Onumonu	(substituted on) 67'
DF	5	Onome Ebi	(substituted on) 83'
Manager:
(United States) Randy Waldrum

Player of the Match:
Courtney Brosnan (Republic of Ireland)

Assistant referees:
Karen Diaz Medina (Mexico)
Enedina Caudillo (Mexico)
Fourth official:
Lina Lehtovaara (Finland)
Video assistant referee:
Massimiliano Irrati (Italy)
Assistant video assistant referee:
Salomé di Iorio (Argentina)
Offside video assistant referee:
Lucie Ratajová (Czech Republic)

== Discipline ==
Fair play points would have been used as tiebreakers in the group should the overall and head-to-head records of teams were tied. These were calculated based on yellow and red cards received in all group matches as follows:

- first yellow card: minus 1 point;
- indirect red card (second yellow card): minus 3 points;
- direct red card: minus 4 points;
- yellow card and direct red card: minus 5 points;

Only one of the above deductions was applied to a player in a single match.

Team	Match 1				Match 2				Match 3				Points
Team	Booked	(yellow card) (yellow-red card)	Sent off (straight red)	(yellow card) (red card)	Booked	(yellow card) (yellow-red card)	Sent off (straight red)	(yellow card) (red card)	Booked	(yellow card) (yellow-red card)	Sent off (straight red)	(yellow card) (red card)	Points
Australia					1				2				–3
Republic of Ireland	1				1				1				–3
Canada	2				2								–4
Nigeria	1		1		2								–7

== See also ==
- Australia at the FIFA Women's World Cup
- Canada at the FIFA Women's World Cup
- Republic of Ireland at the FIFA Women's World Cup
- Nigeria at the FIFA Women's World Cup
