= Republic of Ireland at the FIFA Women's World Cup =

FIFA Women's World Cup

The Republic of Ireland has qualified to the FIFA Women's World Cup in one occasion, the 2023 FIFA Women's World Cup. In this World Cup, on 26 July 2023, Katie McCabe scored an Olympico goal in Ireland's group stage match against Canada, which was Ireland's first goal at any Women's World Cup.

== FIFA Women's World Cup overviews ==
=== FIFA Women's World Cup ===
World Cup Finals
Year	Result	GP	W	D*	L	GS	GA	GD
(China) 1991	Did not qualify							
(Sweden) 1995	Did not enter							
(United States) 1999	Did not qualify							
(United States) 2003	Did not qualify							
(China) 2007	Did not qualify							
(Germany) 2011	Did not qualify							
(Canada) 2015	Did not qualify							
(France) 2019	Did not qualify							
(Australia) (New Zealand) 2023	Group stage	3	0	1	2	1	3	–2
(Brazil) 2027	To be determined							
(Costa Rica) (Jamaica) (Mexico) (United States) 2031	To be determined							
(United Kingdom) 2035	To be determined							
Total	1/12	3	0	1	2	1	3	–2

FIFA Women's World Cup history
Year	Round	Date	Opponent	Result	Stadium
(Australia) / (New Zealand) 2023	Group stage	20 July	Australia	L 0–1	Stadium Australia, Sydney
(Australia) / (New Zealand) 2023	Group stage	26 July	Canada	L 1–2	Perth Rectangular Stadium, Perth
(Australia) / (New Zealand) 2023	Group stage	31 July	Nigeria	D 0–0	Lang Park, Brisbane

== Record per Opponent ==
FIFA Women's World Cup matches (by team)
Opponent	Pld	W	D	L	GF	GA	GD
Australia	1	0	0	1	0	1	–1
Canada	1	0	0	1	1	2	–1
Nigeria	1	0	1	0	0	0	0

== Participation history ==
=== 2023 FIFA Women's World Cup ===
==== Group B ====
Pos	Team	Pld	W	D	L	GF	GA	GD	Pts	Qualification
1	Australia (H)	3	2	0	1	7	3	+4	6	Advance to knockout stage
2	Nigeria	3	1	2	0	3	2	+1	5	Advance to knockout stage
3	Canada	3	1	1	1	2	5	−3	4	
4	Republic of Ireland	3	0	1	2	1	3	−2	1	

Source: FIFA
Rules for classification: Group stage tiebreakers
(H) Hosts
20 July 2023
20:00 UTC+10

Australia	1–0	Republic of Ireland
Catley 52' (pen.)	Report

Stadium Australia, Sydney
Attendance: 75,784
Referee: Edina Alves Batista (Brazil)

26 July 2023
20:00 UTC+8

Canada	2–1	Republic of Ireland
Connolly 45+5' (o.g.); Leon 53'	Report	McCabe 4'

Perth Rectangular Stadium, Perth
Attendance: 17,065
Referee: Laura Fortunato (Argentina)

31 July 2023
20:00 UTC+10

Republic of Ireland	0–0	Nigeria
	Report

Lang Park, Brisbane
Attendance: 24,884
Referee: Katia García (Mexico)

== Goalscorers ==
Player	Goals	2023
Katie McCabe	1	1
Total	1	1

Own goals scored for opponents

- Megan Connolly (scored for Canada in 2023)
