= Carla Chin =

Jamaican-born Canadian soccer player

Personal information
- Date of birth: 10 May 1966 (age 60)
- Place of birth: Kingston, Jamaica
- Height: 1.65 m (5 ft 5 in)
- Position: Goalkeeper

International career
Years	Team	Apps	(Gls)
1987–1995	Canada	29	(0)

Carla Chin (born 10 May 1966) is a soccer player who played as a goalkeeper. Born in Jamaica, she played for the Canada women's national soccer team. She was part of the team at the 1995 FIFA Women's World Cup.
