= Yinka Kudaisi =

Nigerian former football defender

Personal information
- Date of birth: 25 August 1975 (age 51)
- Place of birth: Nigeria
- Position: Defender

Senior career*
Years	Team	Apps	(Gls)
2004	Pelican Stars		
2006	QBIK		

International career
1995–2008	Nigeria	17	(0)
- * Club domestic league appearances and goals

Yinka Kudaisi (born 25 August 1975) is a Nigerian former football defender who played for the Nigeria women's national football team. She was also part of the national team at the 2004 Summer Olympics. At the club level, she played for Pelican Stars.

== See also ==
- Nigeria at the 2004 Summer Olympics
