= Janine Helland =

Canadian soccer player

Personal information
- Full name: Janine Wood
- Date of birth: 24 April 1970 (age 56)
- Place of birth: Edmonton, Alberta, Canada
- Height: 5 ft 8 in (1.73 m)
- Position: Defender

International career
Years	Team	Apps	(Gls)
1990–1999	Canada	47	(1)

Janine Helland (née Wood; born 24 April 1970) is a Canadian soccer player who played as a defender for the Canada women's national soccer team. She was part of the teams at the 1995 FIFA Women's World Cup and 1999 FIFA Women's World Cup.
