= Paul Hamilton (footballer, born 1941) =

Nigerian footballer and manager

Paul Ebiye Hamilton (31 July 1941 – 30 March 2017) was a Nigerian footballer and manager. He died at the Military Hospital in Lagos, Nigeria.

== Career ==
He spent the bulk of his playing career (1961-1975) with NEPA Lagos.

== Coaching career ==
After retirement he was hired as coach of the U-20 national team. He was then hired as head coach of the Nigeria national football team in 1989 but was fired after Nigeria failed to qualify for the 1990 FIFA World Cup. He went on to coach the female national team for their first World Cup. He received his UEFA coaching license in summer 2006.

== Later life ==
He was said to have been diagnosed with heart and kidney related health issues some months ago.

He had his left leg amputated as the result of many injuries. He died after a long illness in March 2017.
