= Veronica O'Brien =

Canadian soccer player

Personal information
- Date of birth: January 29, 1971 (age 55)
- Place of birth: Barrie, Ontario, Canada
- Height: 1.78 m (5 ft 10 in)
- Position: Midfielder

College career
Years	Team	Apps	(Gls)
1990–1993	New Hampshire Wildcats		

International career
1990–1997	Canada	31	(1)

Managerial career
- 1996–2000: UTEP Miners
- 2001–2011: UC Riverside Highlanders

Veronica O'Brien (born January 29, 1971) is a Canadian soccer player who played as a midfielder for the Canada women's national soccer team. She was part of the team at the 1995 FIFA Women's World Cup.
