= Suzanne Gerrior =

Canadian soccer player

Personal information
- Date of birth: 4 April 1973 (age 53)
- Place of birth: Armdale, Nova Scotia, Canada
- Position: Midfielder

College career
Years	Team	Apps	(Gls)
1991–1994	NC State Wolfpack		

International career
1990–1995	Canada	10	(0)

Suzanne Gerrior (born 4 April 1973) is a Canadian soccer player who played as a midfielder for the Canada women's national soccer team. She was part of the team at the 1995 FIFA Women's World Cup.
