= Karen Farley =

English footballer

Personal information
- Date of birth: 2 September 1970 (age 56)
- Place of birth: England
- Position: Striker

Senior career*
Years	Team	Apps	(Gls)
–1991	Millwall Lionesses		
1992–1993	Lindsdals IF		
1994–1996	Hammarby IF		
1997–1999	Tyresö FF		
2000	Hammarby IF		

International career
1994-1996	England	11	(8)
- * Club domestic league appearances and goals

Karen Farley (born 2 September 1970) is an English former women's international footballer. Her married name is Karen Livermore-Farley.

== Club career ==
She won the 1991 WFA Cup final with Millwall Lionesses when they defeated Doncaster Belles 1-0 at Prenton Park.

In 1995 and 1996 Farley was playing her club football in Sweden. In 2000, she was still playing for Hammarby.

== International career ==
Farley represented England at senior level, playing in England's first ever World Cup finals appearance in 1995 which ended with a 3–0 quarter final defeat against Germany. She played in all four games in the tournament held in Sweden and scored two goals in a game versus Nigeria. She scored eight goals in eleven games for England but successive ACL injuries prevented her from potentially achieving more caps. She was allotted 103 when the FA announced their legacy numbers scheme to honour the 50th anniversary of England’s inaugural international.

=== International goals ===
Scores and results list England's goal tally first.

#	Date	Venue	Opponent	Result	Competition	Scored
1	11 December 1994	Vicarage Road, Watford	Germany	1–4	1995 UEFA Championship	1
2	26 January 1995	Florence	Italy	1–1	Friendly	1
3	23 February 1995	Bochum	Germany	1–2	1995 UEFA Championship	1
5	10 June 1995	Tingvalla IP, Karlstad	Nigeria	3–2	1995 World Cup	2
7	19 November 1995	The Valley, London	Croatia	5–0	1997 UEFA Championship Qual.	2
8	11 February 1996	Benavente	Portugal	5–0	1997 UEFA Championship Qual.	1
