= Candace Chapman =

Canadian soccer player (born 1983)

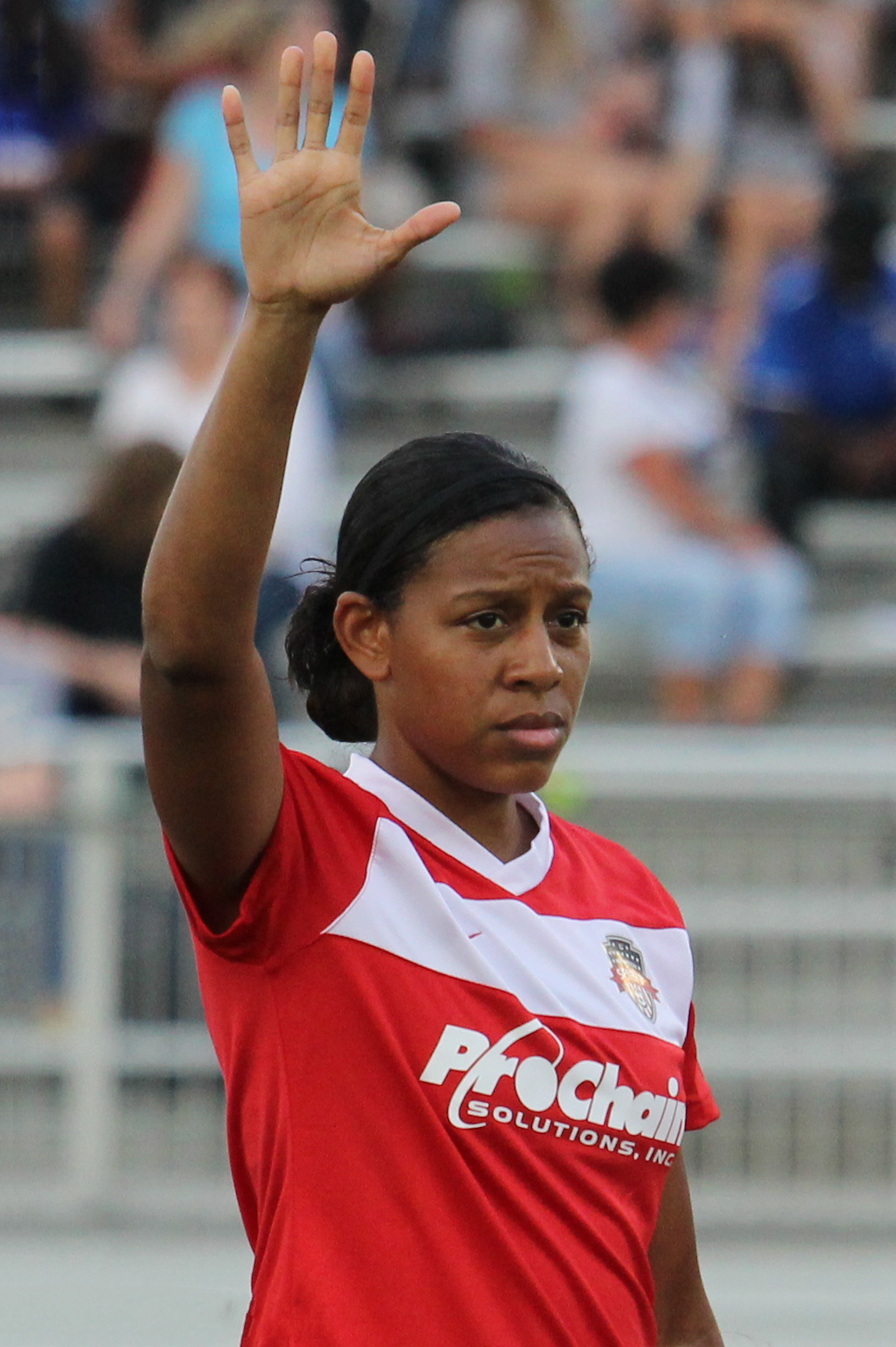
- Chapman with the Spirit in 2013

Personal information
- Full name: Candace Marie Chapman
- Date of birth: 2 April 1983 (age 43)
- Place of birth: Port of Spain, Trinidad and Tobago
- Height: 5 ft 7 in (1.70 m)
- Position: Defender

College career
Years	Team	Apps	(Gls)
2001–2005	Notre Dame Fighting Irish	92	(20)

Senior career*
Years	Team	Apps	(Gls)
2001, 2003	Toronto Inferno		
2005	Atlanta Silverbacks	10	(0)
2006–2008	Vancouver Whitecaps		
2009	Boston Breakers	11	(0)
2010	FC Gold Pride	21	(0)
2011	Western New York Flash	12	(0)
2013	Washington Spirit	8	(0)

International career
2001–2002	Canada U-19	23	(8)
2002–2012	Canada	114	(6)
Medal record
Women's Football
Representing Canada
Summer Olympic Games
Bronze medal – third place	2012 London	Team
Pan American Games
Bronze medal – third place	2007 Rio de Janeiro	Team
Gold medal – first place	2011 Guadalajara	Team
- * Club domestic league appearances and goals

Candace Marie Chapman (born 2 April 1983) is a retired Trinidad and Tobago-born, Canadian soccer player. From Ajax, Ontario, she played as a defender and was a member of the Canadian national team. She is currently a youth team national coach.

== Early life ==
Chapman was born in Port of Spain, Trinidad and Tobago. She is a graduate of the University of Notre Dame with majors in sociology and computer applications.

== Club career ==
After being named as a discovery player by the Boston Breakers of WPS on 16 January 2009, she played with them for the 2009 season. She subsequently agreed to terms with FC Gold Pride for the 2010 season. Following Gold Pride's folding, she signed for Western New York Flash, where she played the 2011 season along with fellow Canadian and national team captain Christine Sinclair.For the 2013 NWSL season Chapman joined Washington Spirit in the new National Women's Soccer League. Because she holds US permanent residency, she was not subject to the league's limit on international players.

== International career ==
On 6 August 2008, Chapman scored the first point in the first event at the 2008 Summer Olympics with her goal against Argentina in the 27th minute in Tianjin, China.

Chapman received her 100th cap against Mexico on 27 January 2012. The game ended in a 3–1 victory for Canada. She won an Olympic bronze medal at the 2012 Summer Olympics when Canada defeated France 1–0 on 9 August 2012. As of May 2018 she is an assistant coach for the Arlington Soccer Association.

== Coaching career ==
Candace continues to coach throughout Maryland with the private coaching service, CoachUp. As of May 2018 she is an assistant coach for the Arlington Soccer Association.

== See also ==
- List of women's footballers with 100 or more international caps
