= Prisca Emeafu =

Nigerian footballer

Personal information
- Date of birth: 30 March 1972 (age 54)
- Position: Defender

International career^{‡}
Years	Team	Apps	(Gls)
- Nigeria
- ‡ National team caps and goals as of 19 June 1999 (before the 1999 FIFA Women's World Cup)

Prisca Emeafu (born 30 March 1972) is former footballer who played as a defender for the Nigeria women's national football team. She was part of the national team at the 1995 FIFA Women's World Cup and 1999 FIFA Women's World Cup.
