= Helen Stoumbos =

Canadian soccer player and television broadcaster

Personal information
- Full name: Helen Stoumbos
- Date of birth: 18 October 1970 (age 56)
- Place of birth: Guelph, Ontario
- Height: 1.59 m (5 ft 2 1/2 in)
- Position: Center midfielder

Youth career
- 1989–1993: Wilfrid Laurier Golden Hawks

Senior career*
Years	Team	Apps	(Gls)
- Buffalo FFillies
- Toronto Inferno

International career^{‡}
1993–2000	Canada	35	(1)
- * Club domestic league appearances and goals ‡ National team caps and goals as of 19:45, 1 September 2013 (UTC)

Helen Stoumbos (born October 18, 1970) is a Canadian retired soccer player and television broadcaster. A Center Midfield, she represented Canada at the 1995 edition of the FIFA Women's World Cup and scored the team's first ever goal at World Cup level. Stoumbos was a member of the winning Canadian squad at the 1998 CONCACAF Women's Championship and was inducted into the Canadian Soccer Hall of Fame in 2008.

After injury curtailed Stoumbos' playing career, she moved into television broadcasting, working on football coverage from Sportsnet, CBC Sports and GolTV.

Helen went on to host and produce a number of sports related TV Series: Direct Kicks, Direct Kicks for Chicks, Slapstick TV: The Hockey Show, SportsTrek and most recently We Live Soccer. These series aired on various networks in Canada, the US and Malaysia.

Currently Helen is the Founder/CEO of The GOOD Games, Canada's biggest festival of sport. The event includes sports competitions for athletes 20+ as well as a massive Olympic style sports festival.

In 2016, together with 3 former teammates, Helen launched the Canadian Women's Soccer Alumni Association.

== Club career ==
Stoumbos played local soccer in Guelph from the age of 10, encouraged and supported by her Greek father John. From 1989 to 1993 Stoumbos played college soccer for Wilfrid Laurier University. Helen was an All Canadian All Star 4 times and received the Presidents Award for Outstanding Female Athlete of the Year a record 3 times. She returned to coach the team in 1996 and was inducted into the University's Athletic Hall of Fame in 1999.

During the late 1990s Stoumbos played professionally in the North American W-League for Buffalo FFillies and Toronto Inferno.

== International career ==
Stoumbos represented Canada at the World Student Games in July 1993. She had already made her senior national team debut the previous month, in a 4–0 defeat to Italy in Columbus, Ohio.

At the 1995 FIFA Women's World Cup, Stoumbos became the first Canadian player of either gender to score a World Cup goal. With Canada 3–0 down to England in their opening match, she scored direct from a corner kick in the 87th minute as England goalkeeper Pauline Cope missed her punch. Geri Donnelly pulled another goal back in injury time but Canada lost 3–2.

Canada qualified for the 1999 FIFA Women's World Cup by winning the 1998 CONCACAF Women's Championship, in the absence of the United States who had qualified automatically as hosts. Stoumbos was not named in the squad for the finals, undergoing knee surgery just before the tournament.

== International goals ==
No.	Date	Venue	Opponent	Score	Result	Competition
1.	6 June 1995	Helsingborg, Sweden	England	1–3	2–3	1995 FIFA Women's World Cup
