= Nkiru Okosieme =

Nigerian footballer

Personal information
- Full name: Nkiru Doris Okosieme
- Date of birth: 1 March 1972 (age 54)
- Place of birth: Nigeria
- Height: 1.67 m (5 ft 6 in)
- Position: Midfielder

College career
Years	Team	Apps	(Gls)
2000	King Tornado		
2001–2004	Clayton State Lakers		

Senior career*
Years	Team	Apps	(Gls)
- S.C. Imo State
- Rivers Angels
2000–2005	Charlotte Lady Eagles		

International career
1991–2003	Nigeria		
- * Club domestic league appearances and goals

Nkiru Doris "NK" Okosieme (born 1 March 1972) is a former captain of the Nigeria women's national football team who played as a midfielder.

She played across four FIFA Women's World Cups (1991, 1995, 1999 and 2003), several African Women Cup of Nations and 2000 Summer Olympics. Okosieme was nicknamed "The Headmistress" for her habit of scoring important goals with her head.

== Career ==
Okosieme captained Nigeria at the inaugural 1991 FIFA Women's World Cup while still a teenager. She played the full 80 minutes in all three of Nigeria's defeats, while attached to the S.C. Imo State club.

At the 1999 FIFA Women's World Cup, Okosieme was playing for Rivers Angels. Before the tournament she declared: "We no longer have an inferiority complex". She scored three goals in four games as Nigeria reached the quarter-finals, losing 4–3 to Brazil. Okosieme enjoyed playing in America so much that she joined USL W-League club Charlotte Lady Eagles and enrolled at university, where she played college soccer. The W-league is the highest level for women's soccer in U.S. today. In 2001, "NK" was the second highest goal scorer in NCAA Div II. She has won the Peach Belt Conference Player of the Year, and in the All-Regional team for four years. She was also a NSCAA All-American.

Okosieme has won the Africa Women Cup of Nations with the "Super Falcons" on three occasions in 1998, 2000, 2002 .

Her brother Ndubuisi Okosieme was also an international footballer.

== See also ==
- Nigeria at the 2000 Summer Olympics
