= Tingvalla IP =

Sports venue in Karlstad, Sweden

Coordinates: 59°23′12″N 13°29′37″E

- Tingvalla
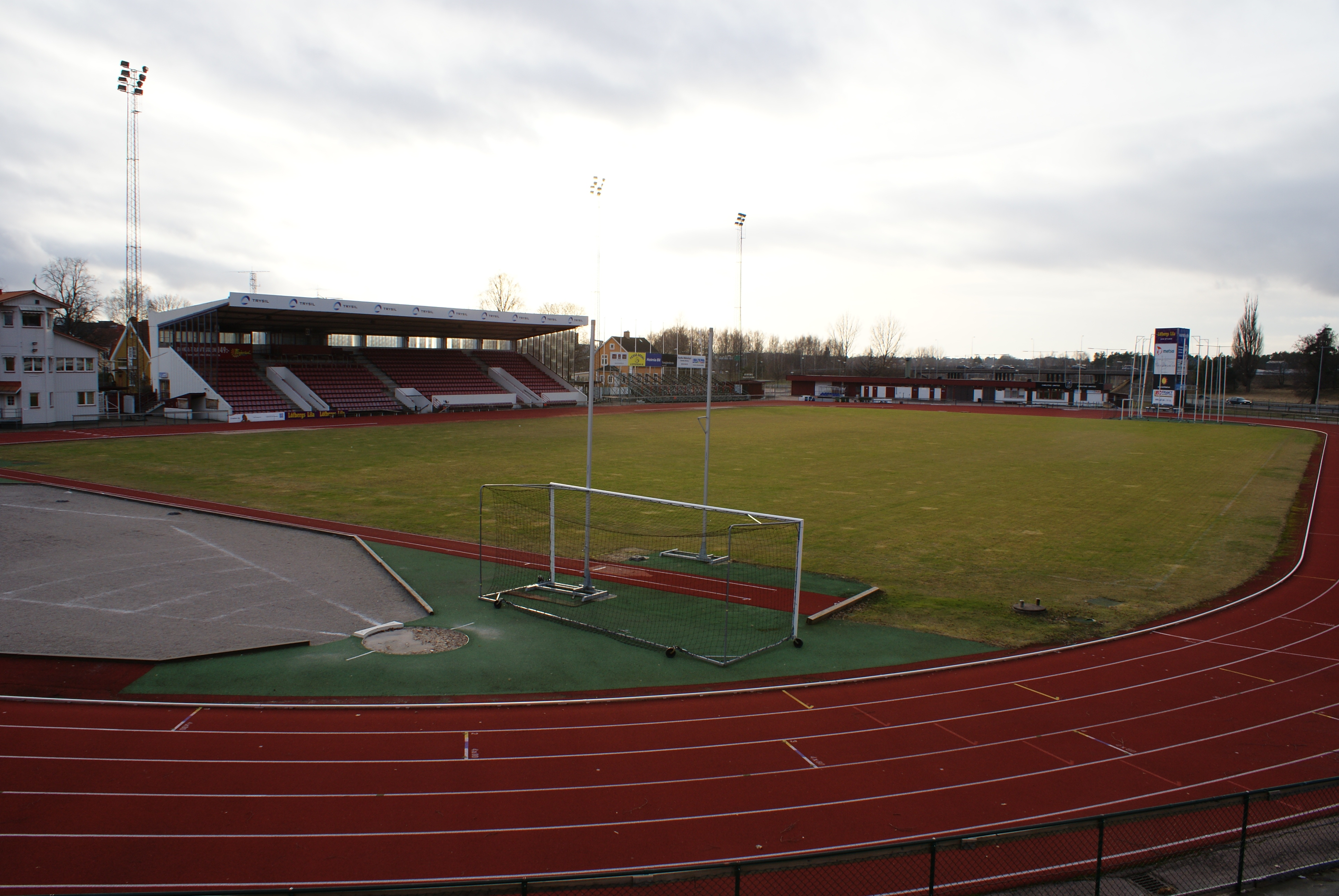
- Tingvalla IP in 2008
- Interactive map of Tingvalla IP
- Full name: Tingvalla Idrottsplats
- Capacity: 10,000
- Field size: 105 x 65 m

Construction
- Built: 1919
- Opened: 1919

Tenants
- IF Karlstad Fotboll; Carlstad Crusaders; QBIK

Tingvalla Idrottsplats (abbreviated as Tingvalla IP) is a stadium in Karlstad, Sweden and is the home ground of the football team Carlstad United and the American football team Carlstad Crusaders. It is also used for athletic events and other sports and gatherings.

Built in 1919, it has a capacity of 10,000 (of which only 1,100 are seated). The attendance record was set on 24 August 2000, when 10,421 spectators saw Carlstad United play S.S. Lazio.

As the football club Karlstad BK (KBK) is about to play its matches in Division 2 (4th highest level) on Tingvalla IP, the municipality decided in 2010 to make a small renovation of the facility, including a new stand for 250 persons, a new match clock and new fences.

== 1995 FIFA Women's World Cup matches ==
Date	Time (UTC+01)	Team No. 1	Res.	Team No. 2	Round	Attendance
5 June 1995	14:00	Germany	1–0	Japan	Group A	3,824
6 June 1995	19:00	Norway	8–0	Nigeria	Group B	4,344
7 June 1995	19:00	Brazil	1–2	Japan	Group A	2,286
8 June 1995	19:00	Norway	2–0	England	Group B	5,520
9 June 1995	19:00	Brazil	1–6	Germany	Group A	3,203
10 June 1995	16:00	Nigeria	2–3	England	Group B	5,520
13 June 1995	17:15	Norway	3–1	Denmark	Quarter-finals	4,655
