= Finau Vulivuli =

Fijian women's football referee (born 1982)

- Full name: Finau Lusiana Vulivuli
- Born: 18 August 1982 (age 44); Savusavu, Fiji

Domestic
Years	League	Role

International
Years	League	Role

Finau Lusiana Vulivuli (born 18 August 1982 in Savusavu) is a Fijian women's football referee. She refereed the Nigeria–Canada Matchday 3 game in the 2011 World Cup, and she has also officiated first stage games in the 2008, 2010, 2012 and 2016 U–17 World Cups. Vulivuli has also attended FIFA Under-20 World Cup. In 2016, she has become the first Fiji referee to attend two World Cups in a single year after being selected for the Under-17 and Under-20 World Cups.She has also refereed male football games in Fiji, including the 2013 Battle of the Giants and Inter District Championships finals.

Her brothers Albert and Thomas are international rugby union and football players respectively. Thomas was part of the Fiji team that won gold at the then South Pacific Games in 2003.

Albert is currently playing for Racing Metro in the France T14.
