= Patience Avre =

Nigerian former football forward

Personal information
- Date of birth: 10 June 1976 (age 50)
- Place of birth: Nigeria
- Position: Forward

International career
Years	Team	Apps	(Gls)
2000	Nigeria	16	(1)

Patience Avre (born 10 June 1976) is a Nigerian former football forward who played for the Nigeria women's national football team at the 1995, 1999 and 2003 FIFA Women's World Cups as well as the 2000 Summer Olympics.

== See also ==
- Nigeria at the 2000 Summer Olympics
