= Olympia (Helsingborg) =

Association football stadium in Helsingborg, Sweden

Coordinates: 56°02′58″N 12°42′25″E

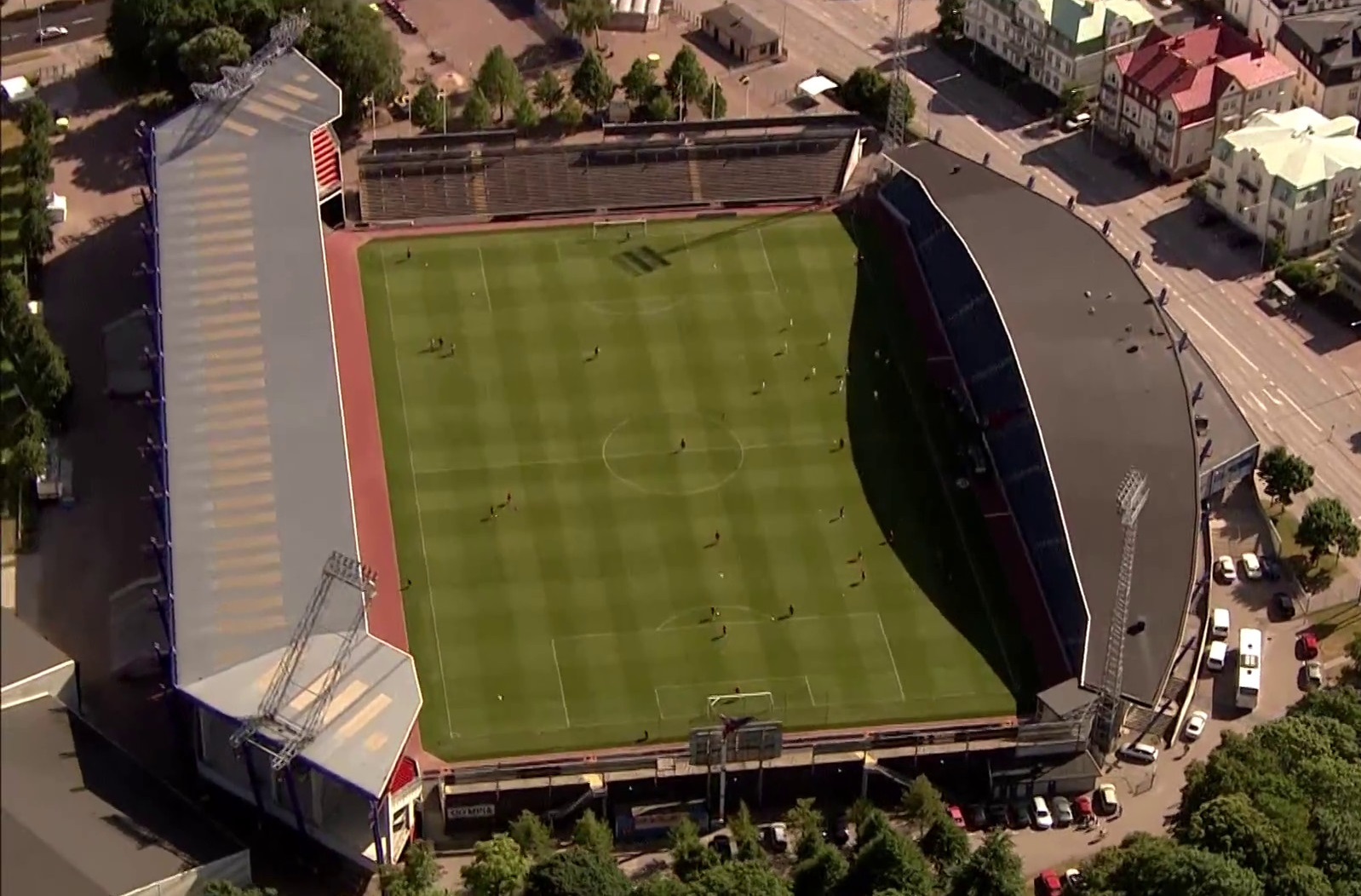
- Olympia
- Interactive map of Olympia
- Full name: Olympia
- Location: Helsingborg, Sweden
- Capacity: 16,000
- Field size: 105 x 68 m

Construction
- Built: ?–1898
- Opened: 31 July 1898

Tenants
- Helsingborgs IF; Ramlösa IF (mid 1980's); Ängelholms FF (2014)

Olympia, sometimes referred to as Olympiastadion (English: Olympic Stadium), is a football stadium in Helsingborg, Sweden. It was opened in 1898, but has been rebuilt in 1993, 1997 and 2014–2017, and has a capacity of 16,000 (14,000 seated and 2,000 standing). All stands can be converted into seaters, giving a capacity of around 15,000. It is the home ground of Superettan side Helsingborgs IF.

On October 22, 2014 the Helsingborg City Council, who owns Olympia, unanimously voted to renovate and rebuild the stadium. The construction will start after the 2014 Allsvenskan season and will be finished in early to mid 2017. This will be the fourth updating of the arena since 1985. Before 1985 the arena was in a dreadful state with athletic running tracks, wooden stands, and a very poor lighting system.

The name of this arena has no actual connection to the Olympic Games, but since the modern Olympic's started in 1896 and Olympia was opened two years later, it seems a possible thought that the name was influenced by the at the time renewed Olympic Games.

The record for attendance is 26,154 and was set 14 May 1954, when Helsingborgs IF played Malmö FF.

In 1958 the stadium hosted two FIFA World Cup matches, and seven matches in FIFA Women's World Cup 1995.

At the Helsingborgs IF matches Hey Jude by The Beatles is played during halftime and when Helsingborgs IF win a game What a Beautiful Day by The Levellers is played.

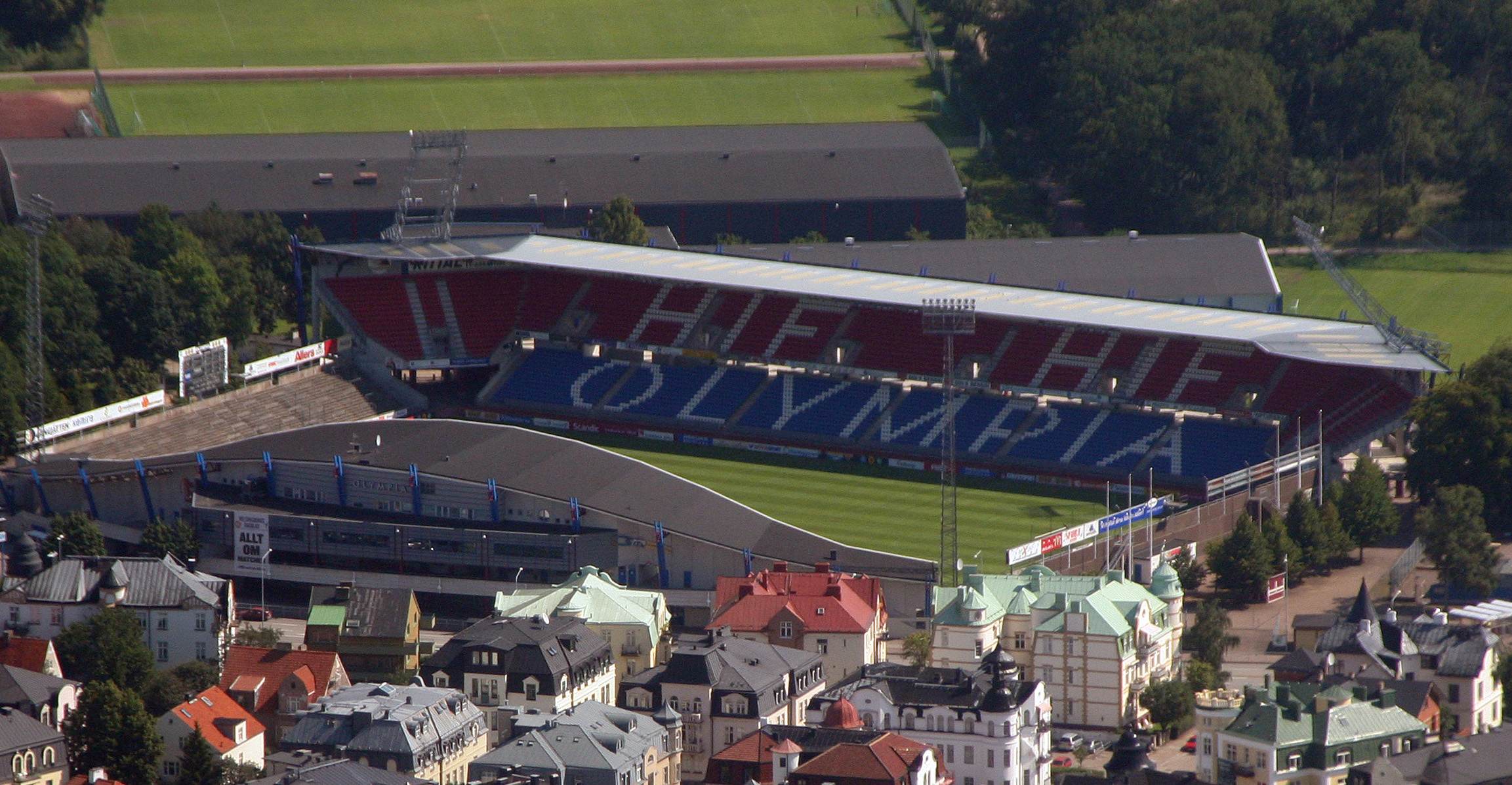
Olympia seen from a distance.

== 1958 FIFA World Cup matches ==
Date	Time (UTC+01)	Team No. 1	Res.	Team No. 2	Round	Attendance
11 June 1958	19:00	West Germany	2–2	Czechoslovakia	Group 1	25,000
15 June 1958	19:00	Czechoslovakia	6–1	Argentina	Group 1	16,418

== 1995 FIFA Women's World Cup matches ==
Date	Time (UTC+01)	Team No. 1	Res.	Team No. 2	Round	Attendance
5 June 1995	18:00	Sweden	0–1	Brazil	Group A	14,500
6 June 1995	19:00	England	3–2	Canada	Group B	655
7 June 1995	19:00	Sweden	3–2	Germany	Group A	5,855
8 June 1995	19:00	Nigeria	3–3	Canada	Group B	250
10 June 1995	16:00	United States	4–1	Australia	Group C	1,105
13 June 1995	16:00	Sweden	1–1 (3–4 pen.)	China	Quarter-finals	7,537
17 June 1995	16:00	Germany	1–0	China	Semi-finals	3,693

== See also ==
- List of football stadiums in Sweden
- Lists of stadiums
