= Adaku Okoroafor =

Nigerian footballer

Personal information
- Date of birth: 18 November 1974 (age 51)
- Position: Forward

International career^{‡}
Years	Team	Apps	(Gls)
- Nigeria
- ‡ National team caps and goals as of 5 June 1995 (before the 1995 FIFA Women's World Cup)

Adaku Okoroafor (born 18 November 1974) is a Nigerian former footballer who played as a forward for the Nigeria women's national football team. She was part of the team at the inaugural 1991 FIFA Women's World Cup as well as the 1995 FIFA Women's World Cup.
