= Rita Nwadike =

Nigerian footballer

Personal information
- Date of birth: 3 November 1974 (age 51)
- Place of birth: Nigeria
- Position: Midfielder

Senior career*
Years	Team	Apps	(Gls)
2004	Rivers Angels		

International career
2004	Nigeria	14	(0)
- * Club domestic league appearances and goals

Rita Nwadike // (born 3 November 1974) is a Nigerian former football midfielder who played for the Nigeria women's national football team at the 2004 Summer Olympics. At the club level, she played for Rivers Angels. She scored Nigeria's first ever FIFA Women's World Cup goal against Canada in the 1995 tournament in Sweden.

== See also ==
- Nigeria at the 2004 Summer Olympics
