= Geri Donnelly =

Canadian soccer player

Personal information
- Full name: Geraldine Donnelly
- Date of birth: 30 November 1965 (age 60)
- Place of birth: London, England
- Height: 1.63 m (5 ft 4 in)
- Position: Midfielder

Senior career*
Years	Team	Apps	(Gls)
- Port Moody Soccer Club
- Coquitlam Strikers
- Metro-Ford Soccer Club
- Vancouver Whitecaps
2003–2009	Surrey United		

International career^{‡}
1986–1999	Canada	71	(9)
- * Club domestic league appearances and goals ‡ National team caps and goals as of 19:45, 29 August 2013 (UTC)

Geraldine "Geri" Donnelly (born 30 November 1965) is a Canadian former soccer player. A midfielder, she represented Canada at the 1995 and 1999 editions of the FIFA Women's World Cup and was named Canadian Player of the Year in 1996 and 1999. Donnelly was part of the Canadian squad who won the 1998 CONCACAF Women's Championship. She was selected as a member of the Canadian Soccer Hall of Fame in 2014.

== Club career ==
Born in London, Donnelly played street soccer with local boys before her family moved to Port Moody, British Columbia when she was eight.

Donnelly played with Vancouver Angels in the Women's Premier Soccer League (WPSL), remaining with the club when they moved to the W-League and were amalgamated into Vancouver Whitecaps, after playing the transitional 2001 W-League season as Vancouver Breakers.

Aged 43, she retired from soccer in 2009 after guiding Surrey United to six consecutive provincial titles.

== International career ==
In Canada's second-ever match, two days after their first, Donnelly made her debut. She scored both goals in a 2–1 win over the United States on 9 July 1986 at the National Sports Center, Blaine, Minnesota. The goals were Canada's first ever, as they had been beaten 2–0 by the United States in the first game.

Donnelly played at a time when women's soccer in Canada was in its infancy. Port Moody Soccer Club, the town's Rotary Club and a local Safeway supermarket raised $1,500 to enable Donnelly to join the first national team tour, to Taiwan in 1987. She also played for Canada in the 1988 FIFA Women's Invitation Tournament, where they lost 1–0 to Sweden in the quarter-finals.

At the 1995 FIFA Women's World Cup, Donnelly scored in Canada's first two games: an injury time consolation in Canada's opening 3–2 defeat against the land of her birth England and the second in a 3–3 draw with Nigeria. She played 90 minutes in the final group match, as Canada were spanked 7–0 by eventual champions Norway.

Canada qualified for the 1999 FIFA Women's World Cup by winning the 1998 CONCACAF Women's Championship, in the absence of the United States who had qualified automatically as hosts. Donnelly was named in the squad for the finals, while attached to the Metro-Ford Soccer Club. Donnelly played in a 1–1 draw with Japan, a 7–1 defeat to Norway and a 4–1 defeat by Russia as the Canadians suffered another first round elimination. She retired from national team play after the tournament, as Canada's record appearance holder with 71 caps.

== International goals ==
No.	Date	Venue	Opponent	Score	Result	Competition
1.	9 July 1986	Blaine, United States	United States	1–0	2–1	Friendly
2.	9 July 1986	Blaine, United States	United States	2–0	2–1	Friendly
3.	21 April 1990	Varna, Bulgaria	Soviet Union	?–0	5–0	Friendly
4.	21 April 1990	Varna, Bulgaria	Soviet Union	?–0	5–0	Friendly
5.	21 April 1990	Varna, Bulgaria	Soviet Union	?–0	5–0	Friendly
6.	13 August 1994	Montreal, Canada	Jamaica	4–0	7–0	1994 CONCACAF Women's Championship
7.	6 June 1995	Helsingborg, Sweden	England	2–3	2–3	1995 FIFA Women's World Cup
8.	8 June 1995	Helsingborg, Sweden	Nigeria	2–0	3–3	1995 FIFA Women's World Cup
9.	10 January 1999	Canberra, Australia	Australia	1–0	3–4	1999 Australia Cup

== Honours ==
- Aubrey Sanford Meritorious Service Award: 2002
