= Football at the 1996 Summer Olympics =

Football at the Games of the XXVI Olympiad
- Football pictogram for the 1996 Summer Olympics

Event details
- Games: 1996 Summer Olympics
- Host country: United States
- Dates: July 20 – August 3, 1996
- Venues: 5 (in 5 host cities)
- Competitors: 388 from 21 nations

Men's tournament
- Teams: 16 (from 6 confederations)
Medalists
Gold	Nigeria
Silver	Argentina
Bronze	Brazil

Women's tournament
- Teams: 8 (from 4 confederations)
Medalists
Gold	United States
Silver	China
Bronze	Norway

Editions
- ← 1992 2000 →

Football was contested as part of the programme for the 1996 Summer Olympics which was hosted in Atlanta, Georgia, United States from July 20 to August 3, 1996. The women's competition was contested for the first time in Olympic history at these Games.

In the men's tournament, Nigeria defeated Argentina 3–2 in the final. In the women's tournament, the United States defeated China 2–1 in the final.

A number of firsts occurred during the 1996 Games. Alongside the first women's tournament, the games marked the first occasion in which the modern under-23 rules, allowing for the inclusion of three overaged players, were implemented in the men's tournament. Nigeria were the first African country to win gold and only the second African country overall to win a medal of any color in football. The United States were the first country from North America to win gold and together with China were the first countries from Asia and North America to win a medal of any color in football.

== Venues ==
The matches were spread around five venues in east and southeast United States. The gold medal matches were played at Sanford Stadium in Athens, Georgia.

Athens	Birmingham	Miami	Football at the 1996 Summer Olympics is located in the United States
Sanford Stadium	Legion Field	Orange Bowl	Football at the 1996 Summer Olympics is located in the United States
Capacity: 86,117	Capacity: 81,700	Capacity: 74,476	Football at the 1996 Summer Olympics is located in the United States
Orlando		Washington, D.C.	Football at the 1996 Summer Olympics is located in the United States
Citrus Bowl		Robert F. Kennedy Stadium	Football at the 1996 Summer Olympics is located in the United States
Capacity: 65,000		Capacity: 56,500	Football at the 1996 Summer Olympics is located in the United States

== Overview ==
=== Men's tournament ===
The 1996 Summer Olympics saw the modification of the under-23 rules for the men's football tournament. Teams were made up of players under the age of 23 with a maximum of three overage players allowed.

In the gold medal match, Nigeria defeated Argentina 3–2. In doing so, they became the first African country to win a gold medal in football, four years after Ghana became the first African team to win a medal of any colour. Brazil won bronze after a 5–0 win over Portugal.

=== Women's tournament ===
In the inaugural women's tournament, the United States won the gold medal after defeating China in the final. Despite football having been part of the Olympics since 1908, only teams from Europe and South America had won medals. As a result, the United States and China were the first countries from North America and Asia respectively to win medals in football. Norway won bronze after defeating Brazil 2–0.

== Medal winners ==
=== Men ===
Event	Gold	Silver	Bronze
Men's football	Nigeria; Emmanuel Babayaro; Celestine Babayaro; Taribo West; Nwankwo Kanu; Uche Okechukwu; Emmanuel Amunike; Tijani Babangida; Wilson Oruma; Teslim Fatusi; Jay-Jay Okocha; Victor Ikpeba; Abiodun Obafemi; Garba Lawal; Daniel Amokachi; Sunday Oliseh; Kingsley Obiekwu; Mobi Oparaku; Dosu Joseph	Argentina; Carlos Bossio; Roberto Ayala; José Chamot; Javier Zanetti; Matías Almeyda; Roberto Sensini; Claudio López; Diego Simeone; Hernán Crespo; Ariel Ortega; Hugo Morales; Pablo Cavallero; Héctor Pineda; Pablo Paz; Christian Bassedas; Gustavo López; Marcelo Delgado; Marcelo Gallardo	Brazil; Dida; Zé María; Aldair; Ronaldo Guiaro; Flávio Conceição; Roberto Carlos; Bebeto; Amaral; Ronaldo; Rivaldo; Sávio; Danrlei; Narciso; André Luiz; Zé Elias; Marcelinho; Luizão; Juninho

=== Women ===
Event	Gold	Silver	Bronze
Women's football	United States; Briana Scurry; Mary Harvey; Cindy Parlow; Carla Overbeck; Tiffany Roberts; Brandi Chastain; Staci Wilson; Shannon MacMillan; Mia Hamm; Michelle Akers; Julie Foudy; Carin Gabarra; Kristine Lilly; Joy Fawcett; Tisha Venturini; Tiffeny Milbrett; Amanda Cromwell; Thori Staples Bryan; Saskia Webber	China; Zhong Honglian; Wang Liping; Fan Yunjie; Yu Hongqi; Xie Huilin; Zhao Lihong; Wei Haiying; Shui Qingxia; Sun Wen; Liu Ailing; Sun Qingmei; Wen Lirong; Liu Ying; Chen Yufeng; Shi Guihong; Gao Hong; Zhang Yan; Niu Lijie	Norway; Bente Nordby; Agnete Carlsen; Gro Espeseth; Nina Nymark Andersen; Merete Myklebust; Hege Riise; Anne Nymark Andersen; Heidi Støre; Marianne Pettersen; Linda Medalen; Brit Sandaune; Reidun Seth; Tina Svensson; Tone Haugen; Trine Tangeraas; Ann Kristin Aarønes; Tone Gunn Frustøl; Kjersti Thun; Ingrid Sternhoff

== Match officials ==
FIFA named 16 referees and 16 assistant referees to be shared between the men's and women's tournaments.

Referees
Confederation	Referee
Male officials
AFC	Omer Al Mehannah (Saudi Arabia)
AFC	Pirom Un-prasert (Thailand)
CAF	Gamal Al-Ghandour (Egypt)
CAF	Lucien Bouchardeau (Niger)
CONCACAF	Benito Archundia (Mexico)
CONCACAF	Esfandiar Baharmast (United States)
CONMEBOL	Antônio Pereira (Brazil)
CONMEBOL	Roberto Ruscio (Argentina)
OFC	Eddie Lennie (Australia)
UEFA	Pierluigi Collina (Italy)
UEFA	Hugh Dallas (Scotland)
UEFA	José María García-Aranda (Spain)
Female officials
CONCACAF	Sonia Denoncourt (Canada)
CONMEBOL	Cláudia Vasconcelos (Brazil)
UEFA	Ingrid Jonsson (Sweden)
UEFA	Bente Ovedie Skogvang (Norway)

Assistant referees
Confederation	Assistant referee
Male officials
AFC	Jeon Young-hyun (South Korea)
AFC	Mohamed Al-Musawi (Oman)
CAF	Dramane Dante (Mali)
CAF	Amir Osman Mohamed Hamid (Sudan)
CONCACAF	Peter Kelly (Trinidad and Tobago)
CONCACAF	Luis Fernando Torres Zúñiga (Costa Rica)
CONMEBOL	Jorge Luis Arango (Colombia)
CONMEBOL	Carlos Velázquez (Uruguay)
OFC	Lencie Fred (Vanuatu)
UEFA	Yuri Dupanov (Belarus)
UEFA	Heiner Neuenstein (Germany)
UEFA	Akif Uğurdur (Turkey)
Female officials
CONCACAF	Janice Gettemeyer (United States)
CONCACAF	María del Socorro Rodríguez (Mexico)
UEFA	Gitte Holm (Denmark)
UEFA	Nelly Viennot (France)
