= Football at the 1996 Summer Olympics – Men's tournament =

1996 Men's Olympic Football Tournament

Tournament details
- Host country: United States
- Dates: July 20 – August 3
- Teams: 16 (from 6 confederations)
- Venues: 5 (in 5 host cities)

Final positions
- Champions: Nigeria (1st title)
- Runners-up: Argentina
- Third place: Brazil
- Fourth place: Portugal

Tournament statistics
- Matches played: 32
- Goals scored: 90 (2.81 per match)
- Top scorer(s): (Brazil) Bebeto (Argentina) Hernán Crespo (6 goals each)

The 1996 Men's Olympic Football Tournament, played as part of the 1996 Summer Olympics, was hosted in Birmingham, Alabama, Washington, D.C., Orlando, Florida, Miami, Florida and Athens, Georgia. From 1992 onwards, male competitors should be under 23 years old and starting from this tournament, a maximum of three over-23 players are allowed per squad. The tournament featured 16 national teams from the six continental confederations. The 16 teams were drawn into four groups of four and each group played a round-robin tournament. At the end of the group stage, the top two teams advanced to the knockout stage, beginning with the quarter-finals and culminating with the gold medal match at Sanford Stadium on August 3, 1996.

Nigeria defeated Argentina 3–2 in the final for their first gold medal.

== Competition schedule ==
The match schedule of the tournament.

Legend
G	Group stage	¼	Quarter-finals	½	Semi-finals	B	Bronze medal match	F	Gold medal match

20 Sat	21 Sun	22 Mon	23 Tue	24 Wed	25 Thu	26 Fri	27 Sat	28 Sun	29 Lun	30 Tue	31 Wed	1 Thu	2 Fri	3 Sat
G	G	G	G	G	G		¼	¼		½	½		B	F

== Venues ==
Athens, Georgia	Birmingham, Alabama	Miami, Florida	Football at the 1996 Summer Olympics – Men's tournament is located in the United States
Sanford Stadium	Legion Field	Orange Bowl	Football at the 1996 Summer Olympics – Men's tournament is located in the United States
Capacity: 86,100	Capacity: 81,700	Capacity: 74,476	Football at the 1996 Summer Olympics – Men's tournament is located in the United States
Orlando, Florida		Washington, D.C.	Football at the 1996 Summer Olympics – Men's tournament is located in the United States
Citrus Bowl		Robert F. Kennedy Stadium	Football at the 1996 Summer Olympics – Men's tournament is located in the United States
Capacity: 65,000		Capacity: 56,500	Football at the 1996 Summer Olympics – Men's tournament is located in the United States

== Qualification ==
The following 16 teams qualified for the 1996 Olympic men's football tournament:

Means of qualification	Berths	Qualified
Host nation	1	United States
1996 CONCACAF Preliminary Competition	1	Mexico (winner)
1996 AFC Preliminary Competition	3	South Korea (winner); Japan (runner-up); Saudi Arabia (third-place)
1996 CAF Preliminary Competition	3	Ghana; Tunisia; Nigeria
1996 CONMEBOL Pre-Olympic Tournament	2	Brazil (winner); Argentina (runner-up)
CONCACAF–OFC play-off	1	Australia
1996 UEFA European Under-21 Championship	5	Italy (winner); Spain (runner-up); France (third-place); Hungary (5th); Portugal (6th)
Total	16	

== Match officials ==
Referees
Confederation	Referee
Male officials
AFC	Omer Al Mehannah (Saudi Arabia)
AFC	Pirom Un-prasert (Thailand)
CAF	Gamal Al-Ghandour (Egypt)
CAF	Lucien Bouchardeau (Niger)
CONCACAF	Benito Archundia (Mexico)
CONCACAF	Esfandiar Baharmast (United States)
CONMEBOL	Antônio Pereira (Brazil)
CONMEBOL	Roberto Ruscio (Argentina)
OFC	Eddie Lennie (Australia)
UEFA	Pierluigi Collina (Italy)
UEFA	Hugh Dallas (Great Britain)
UEFA	José María García-Aranda (Spain)

Fourth officials
Confederation	Referee
Female officials
UEFA	Ingrid Jonsson (Sweden)

Assistant referees
Confederation	Assistant referee
Male officials
AFC	Jeon Young-hyun (South Korea)
AFC	Mohamed Al-Musawi (Oman)
CAF	Dramane Dante (Mali)
CAF	Amir Osman Mohamed Hamid (Sudan)
CONCACAF	Peter Kelly (Trinidad and Tobago)
CONCACAF	Luis Fernando Torres Zúñiga (Costa Rica)
CONMEBOL	Jorge Luis Arango (Colombia)
CONMEBOL	Carlos Velázquez (Uruguay)
OFC	Lencie Fred (Vanuatu)
UEFA	Yuri Dupanov (Belarus)
UEFA	Heiner Neuenstein (Germany)
UEFA	Akif Uğurdur (Turkey)
Female officials
CONCACAF	María del Socorro Rodríguez (Mexico)
UEFA	Gitte Holm (Denmark)
UEFA	Nelly Viennot (France)

== Seeding ==
The draw for the tournament took place on 5 May 1996. The United States, Spain, Ghana and Brazil were seeded for the draw and placed into groups A–D, respectively. The remaining teams, excluding those from Europe, were drawn away from teams of the same region.

Pot 1: Host, Top-Seeded teams from Africa, Europe and South America	Pot 2: Asia, Non-top seeded team from South America	Pot 3: Non-top seeded teams from Europe	Pot 4: Non-top seeded teams from Africa and North America, Inter-continental playoff winner
United States; Spain; Ghana; Brazil	Argentina; Japan; South Korea; Saudi Arabia	France; Hungary; Italy; Portugal	Nigeria; Tunisia; Mexico^{1}; Australia^{2}

^{1} 1996 CONCACAF Pre-Olympic Tournament Champions, team not determined at time of draw.

^{2} CONCACAF–OFC play-off winner, team not determined at time of draw.

== Group stage ==
=== Group A ===
Team	Pld	W	D	L	GF	GA	GD	Pts
Argentina	3	1	2	0	5	3	+2	5
Portugal	3	1	2	0	4	2	+2	5
United States	3	1	1	1	4	4	0	4
Tunisia	3	0	1	2	1	5	−4	1

Source: FIFA
20 July 1996
15:00

Portugal	2–0	Tunisia
Martins 13', 68'	Report

Robert F. Kennedy Stadium, Washington, D.C.
Attendance: 34,796
Referee: Pereira (BRA)
20 July 1996
19:30

United States	1–3	Argentina
Reyna 1'	Report	G. López 26'; Crespo 55'; Simeone 90'

Legion Field, Birmingham, Alabama
Attendance: 83,183
Referee: Bouchardeau (NIG)

22 July 1996
19:30

Argentina	1–1	Portugal
Ortega 45'	Report	Nuno Gomes 70'

Robert F. Kennedy Stadium, Washington, D.C.
Attendance: 25,811
Referee: Al Mehannah (KSA)
22 July 1996
19:30

United States	2–0	Tunisia
Kirovski 38'; Maisonneuve 90'	Report

Legion Field, Birmingham, Alabama
Attendance: 45,687
Referee: Dallas (GBR)

24 July 1996
19:30

Argentina	1–1	Tunisia
Ortega 5'	Report	Mkacher 74'

Legion Field, Birmingham, Alabama
Attendance: 16,826
Referee: Un-Prasert (THA)
24 July 1996
19:30

United States	1–1	Portugal
Maisonneuve 75'	Report	Paulo Alves 33'

Robert F. Kennedy Stadium, Washington, D.C.
Attendance: 58,012
Referee: Lennie (AUS)

=== Group B ===
Team	Pld	W	D	L	GF	GA	GD	Pts
France	3	2	1	0	5	2	+3	7
Spain	3	2	1	0	5	3	+2	7
Australia	3	1	0	2	4	6	−2	3
Saudi Arabia	3	0	0	3	2	5	−3	0

Source: FIFA
20 July 1996
18:30

Spain	1–0	Saudi Arabia
Óscar 80'	Report

Citrus Bowl, Orlando, Florida
Attendance: 28,774
Referee: Collina (ITA)
20 July 1996
18:30

France	2–0	Australia
Pires 11'; Maurice 74'	Report

Orange Bowl, Miami, Florida
Attendance: 14,322
Referee: Ruscio (ARG)

22 July 1996
19:00

France	1–1	Spain
Legwinski 38'	Report	Óscar 85'

Citrus Bowl, Orlando, Florida
Attendance: 16,773
Referee: Un-Prasert (THA)
22 July 1996
19:00

Australia	2–1	Saudi Arabia
Tsekenis 11'; Viduka 63'	Report	Al-Khilaiwi 37'

Orange Bowl, Miami, Florida
Attendance: 5,997
Referee: Baharmast (USA)

24 July 1996
19:00

Spain	3–2	Australia
Raúl 40', 90'; Santi 86'	Report	Vidmar 3', 12'

Citrus Bowl, Orlando, Florida
Attendance: 12,050
Referee: Dallas (GBR)
24 July 1996
19:00

France	2–1	Saudi Arabia
Maurice 20' (pen.); Sibierski 49'	Report	Anwar 26'

Orange Bowl, Miami, Florida
Attendance: 4,615
Referee: Archundia (MEX)

=== Group C ===
Team	Pld	W	D	L	GF	GA	GD	Pts
Mexico	3	1	2	0	2	1	+1	5
Ghana	3	1	1	1	4	4	0	4
South Korea	3	1	1	1	2	2	0	4
Italy	3	1	0	2	4	5	−1	3

Source: FIFA
21 July 1996
12:00

South Korea	1–0	Ghana
Yoon Jong-hwan 41' (pen.)	Report

Robert F. Kennedy Stadium, Washington, D.C.
Attendance: 45,946
Referee: Lennie (AUS)
21 July 1996
17:00

Mexico	1–0	Italy
Palencia 83'	Report

Legion Field, Birmingham, Alabama
Attendance: 44,211
Referee: Dallas (GBR)

23 July 1996
20:00

Mexico	0–0	South Korea
	Report

Legion Field, Birmingham, Alabama
Attendance: 26,111
Referee: Bouchardeau (NIG)
23 July 1996
21:00

Ghana	3–2	Italy
Saba 15', 74'; Ahinful 63' (pen.)	Report	Branca 8', 44' (pen.)

Robert F. Kennedy Stadium, Washington, D.C.
Attendance: 27,849
Referee: Garcia Aranda (ESP)

25 July 1996
21:00

Mexico	1–1	Ghana
Abundis 65'	Report	Ebenzer 44'

Robert F. Kennedy Stadium, Washington, D.C.
Attendance: 30,237
Referee: Pereira (BRA)
25 July 1996
21:00

Italy	2–1	South Korea
Branca 24', 82'	Report	Lee Ki-hyung 62'

Legion Field, Birmingham, Alabama
Attendance: 28,319
Referee: Ruscio (ARG)

=== Group D ===
Team	Pld	W	D	L	GF	GA	GD	Pts
Brazil	3	2	0	1	4	2	+2	6
Nigeria	3	2	0	1	3	1	+2	6
Japan	3	2	0	1	4	4	0	6
Hungary	3	0	0	3	3	7	−4	0

Source: FIFA
21 July 1996
18:30

Japan	1–0	Brazil
Itō 72'	Report

Orange Bowl, Miami, Florida
Attendance: 46,713
Referee: Archundia (MEX)
21 July 1996
18:30

Nigeria	1–0	Hungary
Kanu 77'	Report

Citrus Bowl, Orlando, Florida
Attendance: 25,303
Referee: Un-Prasert (THA)

23 July 1996
20:30

Brazil	3–1	Hungary
Ronaldo 35'; Juninho 61'; Bebeto 84'	Report	Madar 58'

Orange Bowl, Miami, Florida
Attendance: 34,871
Referee: Al-Ghandour (EGY)
23 July 1996
20:30

Nigeria	2–0	Japan
Akiba 83' (o.g.); Okocha 90' (pen.)	Report

Citrus Bowl, Orlando, Florida
Attendance: 22,734
Referee: Collina (ITA)

25 July 1996
21:00

Brazil	1–0	Nigeria
Ronaldo 30'	Report

Orange Bowl, Miami, Florida
Attendance: 55,650
Referee: Baharmast (USA)
25 July 1996
21:00

Japan	3–2	Hungary
Maezono 39' (pen.), 90+1'; Uemura 90'	Report	Sandor 2'; Madar 48'

Citrus Bowl, Orlando, Florida
Attendance: 20,834
Referee: Bouchardeau (NIG)

== Knockout stage ==
Quarter-finals
July 27 – Miami, FL
Portugal (asdet)	2
France	1
July 27 – Birmingham, AL
Argentina	4
Spain	0
July 28 – Birmingham, AL
Mexico	0
Nigeria	2
July 28 – Miami, FL
Brazil	4
Ghana	2

Semi-finals
July 30 – Athens, GA
Portugal	0
Argentina	2
July 31 – Athens, GA
Nigeria (asdet)	4
Brazil	3

Gold medal match
August 3 – Athens, GA
Argentina	2
Nigeria	3
Bronze medal match
August 2 – Athens, GA
Portugal	0
Brazil	5

=== Quarter-finals ===
27 July 1996
18:00

Portugal	2–1 (a.e.t./g.g.)	France
Capucho 7'; Calado 105' (pen.)	Report	Maurice 49' (pen.)

Orange Bowl, Miami, Florida
Attendance: 22,339
Referee: Collina (ITA)
27 July 1996
19:30

Argentina	4–0	Spain
Crespo 47', 88' (pen.); Aranzábal 52' (o.g.); C. López 66'	Report

Legion Field, Birmingham, Alabama
Attendance: 43,507
Referee: Al-Ghandour (EGY)

28 July 1996
16:00

Mexico	0–2	Nigeria
	Report	Okocha 20'; C. Babayaro 84'

Legion Field, Birmingham, Alabama
Attendance: 44,788
Referee: Al Mehannah (KSA)
28 July 1996
18:00

Brazil	4–2	Ghana
Dodoo 18' (o.g.); Ronaldo 56', 62'; Bebeto 72'	Report	Akonnor 23'; Aboagye 53'

Orange Bowl, Miami, Florida
Attendance: 45,257
Referee: Un-Prasert (THA)

=== Semi-finals ===
30 July 1996
18:00

Portugal	0–2	Argentina
	Report	Crespo 55', 61'

Sanford Stadium, Athens, Georgia
Attendance: 78,212
Referee: Baharmast (USA)

31 July 1996
18:00

Nigeria	4–3 (a.e.t./g.g.)	Brazil
Roberto Carlos 20' (o.g.); Ikpeba 78'; Kanu 90', 94'	Report	Flávio Conceição 1', 38'; Bebeto 28'

Sanford Stadium, Athens, Georgia
Attendance: 78,587
Referee: Garcia Aranda (ESP)

=== Bronze medal match ===
August 2, 1996
18:00

Brazil	5–0	Portugal
Ronaldo 5'; Flávio Conceição 11'; Bebeto 47', 54', 75'	Report

Sanford Stadium, Athens, Georgia
Attendance: 68,173
Referee: Al-Ghandour (EGY)

=== Gold medal match ===
August 3, 1996
15:45

Nigeria	3–2	Argentina
Babayaro 28'; Amokachi 74'; Amunike 90'	Report	C. López 3'; Crespo 50' (pen.)

Sanford Stadium, Athens, Georgia
Attendance: 86,117
Referee: Collina (ITA)
Team details

Nigeria
Argentina

GK	18	Joseph Dosu	(yellow card) 90'
RB	17	Mobi Oparaku		(substituted off) 61'
CB	5	Uche Okechukwu
CB	3	Taribo West
LB	2	Celestine Babayaro
DM	15	Sunday Oliseh	(yellow card) 22'
RM	7	Tijani Babangida
LM	11	Victor Ikpeba		(substituted off) 74'
AM	10	Jay-Jay Okocha		(substituted off) 59'
CF	14	Daniel Amokachi
CF	4	Nwankwo Kanu (c)
Substitutes:
MF	13	Garba Lawal		(substituted on) 59'
MF	8	Wilson Oruma	(yellow card) 70'	(substituted on) 61'
MF	6	Emmanuel Amunike		(substituted on) 74'
Manager:
(Netherlands) Jo Bonfrère

GK	12	Pablo Cavallero
RB	4	Javier Zanetti
CB	2	Roberto Ayala
CB	6	Roberto Sensini	(yellow card) 12'
LB	3	José Chamot
DM	5	Matías Almeyda
RM	10	Ariel Ortega
CM	15	Christian Bassedas (c)
LM	11	Hugo Morales		(substituted off) 58'
CF	7	Claudio López
CF	9	Hernán Crespo
Substitutes:
MF	8	Diego Simeone		(substituted on) 58'
Manager:
Daniel Passarella

== Final ranking ==
Pos	Team	Pld	W	D	L	GF	GA	GD	Pts
1	Nigeria	6	5	0	1	12	6	+6	15
2	Argentina	6	3	2	1	13	6	+7	11
3	Brazil	6	4	0	2	16	8	+8	12
4	Portugal	6	2	2	2	6	10	−4	8
5	France	4	2	1	1	6	4	+2	7
6	Spain	4	2	1	1	5	7	−2	7
7	Mexico	4	1	2	1	2	3	−1	5
8	Ghana	4	1	1	2	6	8	−2	4
9	Japan	3	2	0	1	4	4	0	6
10	United States	3	1	1	1	4	4	0	4
11	South Korea	3	1	1	1	2	2	0	4
12	Italy	3	1	0	2	4	5	−1	3
13	Australia	3	1	0	2	4	6	−2	3
14	Tunisia	3	0	1	2	1	5	−4	1
15	Saudi Arabia	3	0	0	3	2	5	−3	0
16	Hungary	3	0	0	3	3	7	−4	0

Source: FIFA

== Goalscorers ==
With six goals, Hernán Crespo of Argentina and Bebeto of Brazil are the top scorers of the tournament. In total, 90 goals were scored by 55 different players, with four of them credited as own goals.

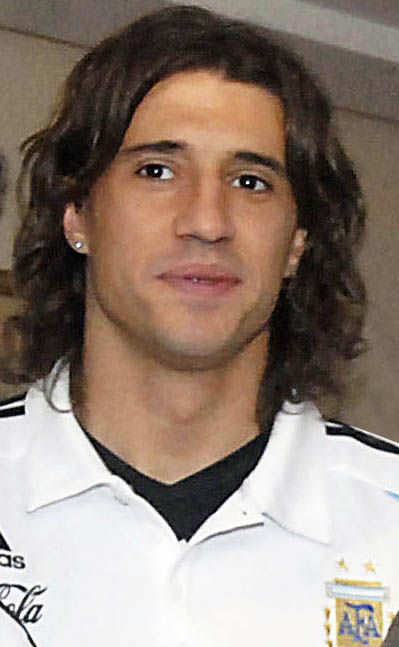
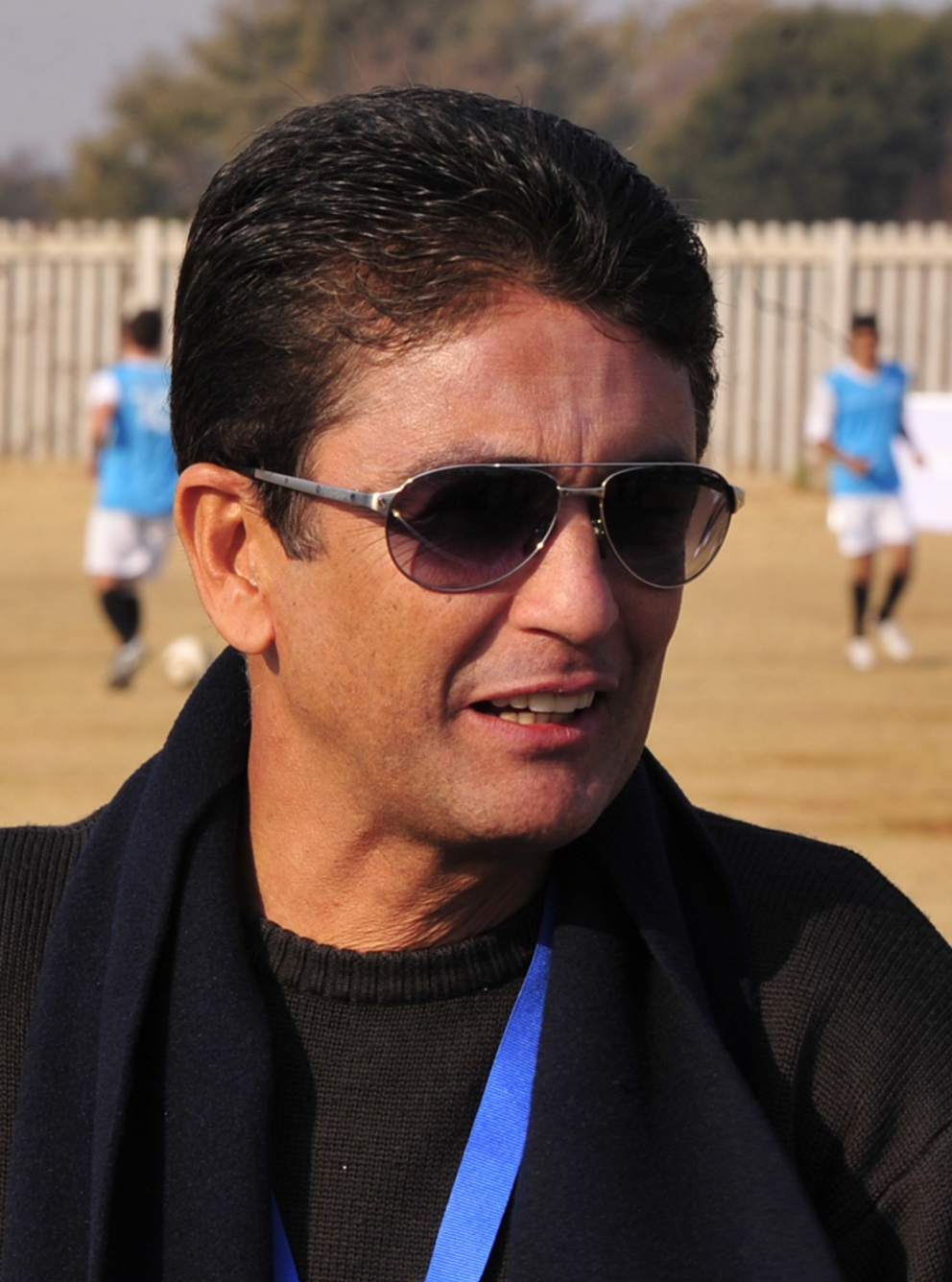
Hernán Crespo (left) and Bebeto (right), top scorers with 6 goals each.

6 goals

- (Argentina) Hernán Crespo
- (Brazil) Bebeto

5 goals

- (Brazil) Ronaldo

4 goals

- (Italy) Marco Branca

3 goals

- (Brazil) Flávio Conceição
- (France) Florian Maurice
- (Nigeria) Nwankwo Kanu

2 goals

- (Argentina) Claudio López
- (Argentina) Ariel Ortega
- (Australia) Aurelio Vidmar
- (Ghana) Christian Saba
- (Hungary) Csaba Madar
- (Japan) Masakiyo Maezono
- (Nigeria) Celestine Babayaro
- (Nigeria) Jay-Jay Okocha
- (Portugal) Afonso Martins
- (Spain) Óscar
- (Spain) Raúl
- (United States) Brian Maisonneuve

1 goal

- (Argentina) Gustavo Adrián López
- (Argentina) Diego Simeone
- (Australia) Peter Tsekenis
- (Australia) Mark Viduka
- (Brazil) Juninho
- (France) Sylvain Legwinski
- (France) Robert Pirès
- (France) Antoine Sibierski
- (Ghana) Felix Aboagye
- (Ghana) Augustine Ahinful
- (Ghana) Charles Akonnor
- (Ghana) Ebenezer Hagan
- (Hungary) Tamás Sándor
- (Japan) Teruyoshi Itō
- (Japan) Kenichi Uemura
- (Mexico) José Manuel Abundis
- (Mexico) Francisco Palencia
- (Nigeria) Daniel Amokachi
- (Nigeria) Emmanuel Amunike
- (Nigeria) Victor Ikpeba
- (Portugal) Paulo Alves
- (Portugal) José Calado
- (Portugal) Capucho
- (Portugal) Nuno Gomes
- (Saudi Arabia) Mohammed Al-Khilaiwi
- (Saudi Arabia) Fuad Anwar Amin
- (South Korea) Lee Ki-hyung
- (South Korea) Yoon Jong-hwan
- (Spain) Santi
- (Tunisia) Mohamed Mkacher
- (United States) Jovan Kirovski
- (United States) Claudio Reyna

Own goals

- (Brazil) Roberto Carlos (playing against Nigeria)
- (Ghana) Afo Dodoo (playing against Brazil)
- (Japan) Tadahiro Akiba (playing against Nigeria)
- (Spain) Agustín Aranzábal (playing against Argentina)
