= Football at the 1996 Summer Olympics – Women's tournament – Group E =

Group E of the women's soccer tournament at the 1996 Summer Olympics was played from 21 to 25 July 1996, and included hosts United States, China, Denmark and Sweden. The top two teams advanced to the Semi-finals.

All times are EST (UTC−5).

== Teams ==
- China
- Denmark
- United States (host nation)
- Sweden

== Standings ==
Pos	Team	Pld	W	D	L	GF	GA	GD	Pts	Qualification
1	China	3	2	1	0	7	1	+6	7	Semi-finals
2	United States (H)	3	2	1	0	5	1	+4	7	Semi-finals
3	Sweden	3	1	0	2	4	5	−1	3	
4	Denmark	3	0	0	3	2	11	−9	0	

Source: FIFA
Rules for classification: Tiebreakers
(H) Hosts

== Matches ==
=== United States vs Denmark ===
21 July 1996
16:00

United States	3–0	Denmark
Venturini 37'; Hamm 41'; Milbrett 49'	Report (FIFA)

Citrus Bowl, Orlando, Florida
Attendance: 25,303
Referee: Cláudia de Vasconcellos (Brazil)

=== Sweden vs China PR ===
21 July 1996
16:00

Sweden	0–2	China
	Report (FIFA)	Shi Guihong 31'; Zhao Lihong 32'

Orange Bowl, Miami, Florida
Attendance: 46,724
Referee: Gamal Al-Ghandour (Egypt)

=== Denmark vs China PR ===
23 July 1996
16:00

Denmark	1–5	China
Madsen 55'	Report (FIFA)	Shi Guihong 10'; Liu Ailing 49'; Sun Qingmei 29', 59'; Fan Yunjie 36'

Orange Bowl, Miami, Florida
Attendance: 34,871
Referee: Benito Archundia (Mexico)

=== United States vs Sweden ===
23 July 1996
18:00

United States	2–1	Sweden
Venturini 15'; MacMillan 62'	Report (FIFA)	Overbeck 64' (o.g.)

Citrus Bowl, Orlando, Florida
Attendance: 28,000
Referee: Bente Ovedie Skogvang (Norway)

=== United States vs China PR ===
25 July 1996
18:30

United States	0–0	China
	Report (FIFA)

Orange Bowl, Miami, Florida
Attendance: 55,650
Referee: Pierluigi Collina (Italy)

=== Denmark vs Sweden ===
25 July 1996
18:30

Denmark	1–3	Sweden
Jensen 90'	Report (FIFA)	Swedberg 62', 68'; Videkull 76'

Citrus Bowl, Orlando, Florida
Attendance: 17,020
Referee: Cláudia de Vasconcellos (Brazil)
