= Women's football in China =

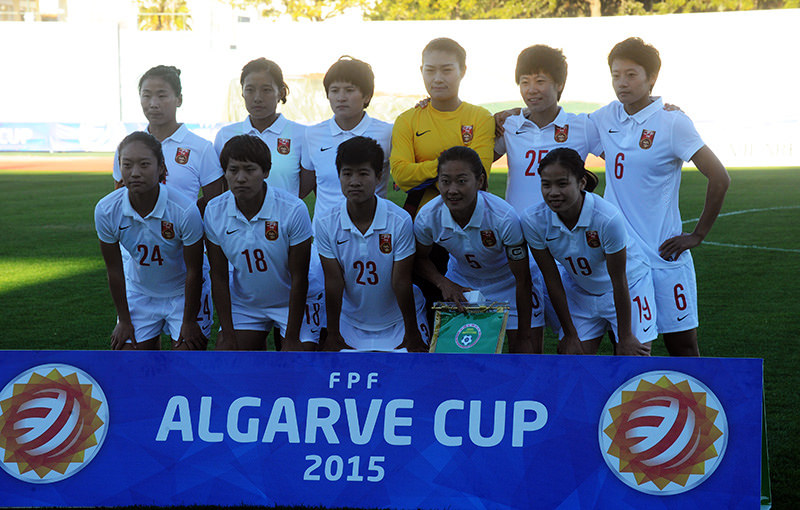
- The Chinese team at the 2015 Algarve Cup
- Country: China
- Governing body: Chinese Football Association
- National team: Women's national team

National competitions
- Chinese Women's Super League

Club competitions
- Chinese Women's FA Cup

International competitions
- Olympics (National Team); FIFA Women's World Cup(National Team); AFC Women's Asian Cup(National Team)

China is one of the traditional powers of women's football. China has only 6,000 to 7,000 registered female players above age 12, according to the Chinese soccer federation statistics. China has fallen behind other countries in the 21st century in regards of developing quality footballers in terms of quality and quantity.

== History ==
In 1924, Sheng Kunnan, a teacher at the Liangjiang Women’s Physical Education Institute, translated a rulebook for women's football from English and began running a women's football team at the institute with the support of Lu Lihua, the institute's director and feminist activist. The institute's team would continue to play, often against men's teams due to a lack of other women's teams, until the Japanese invasion of China in 1937.

In the 1970s, the government of the People's Republic of China began to consider women's football more seriously and began investment into the sport. Along with the opening up of the Chinese economy under Deng Xiaoping and subsequent economic growth, this led to a period of significant growth for the sport and a number of teams and competitions were founded. In 1979, the first semi-professional women's team was established in Xi'an, following the success of a high school competition hosted in that city, and the first national competition was held two years later in Chuxiong City. In 1982, a national invitational tournament was held in Beijing, with Premier Wan Li attending the opening ceremony. In 1986, the China women's national football team played its first international match, losing 2–1 to the United States women's national soccer team.

China was chosen as the host of the 1991 FIFA Women's World Cup, the first FIFA-organised world championship in women's football. The country won the opening match of the tournament 4–0 over Norway in front of an audience of 65 000 at Tianhe Stadium in Guangzhou, with the first goal scored by Ma Li. The team would go on to finish first in Group A before being knocked out by Sweden in the quarter-finals. The Chinese national team continued to perform well through the 1990s, finishing in fourth place at the 1995 FIFA Women's World Cup, earning a silver medal at the 1996 Summer Olympics, and finishing in second at the 1999 FIFA Women's World Cup. Forward Sun Wen was named the best player of the 1999 World Cup, would finish as top scorer of the 2000 Summer Olympics, and was named FIFA Female Player of the Century along with Michelle Akers the following year.

However, the sport underwent a period of decline in the 2000s. Despite hosting the 2007 FIFA Women's World Cup, the Chinese national team failed to qualify for the World Cup for the first time in 2011 and for Summer Olympics for the first time in 2012. In 2005, the Chinese Women's Super League was re-organised away from a model of regular home-and-away matches towards a model where matches were organised on an event basis, leading to a significant drop in attendance. A study of parents of high-school girls that year found that over 40% considered the sport unsuitable for women with only 22% saying that they would allow their daughters to train for a potential career in the sport.

== National competition ==
Women's football first became established in the 1980s.

The previous league was called Women's Primary League. Chinese Women's Super League is the current national competition for female football players in China.

== National team ==
The China women's national football team, organised by the Chinese Football Association, were the first Asian women's team to reach the FIFA Women's World Cup, final in 1999. They also were silver medalists in 1996 Olympics China has also won the AFC Women's Asian Cup 8 times.
