= Football at the 1996 Summer Olympics – Women's tournament – Group F =

Event at the 1996 Summer Olympics

Group F of the women's football tournament at the 1996 Summer Olympics was played from 21 to 25 July 1996, and included Brazil, Germany, Japan and Norway. The top two teams advanced to the Semi-finals, while the bottom two placed teams were eliminated from the competition.

All times are EST (UTC−5).

== Teams ==
- Brazil
- Germany
- Japan
- Norway

== Standings ==
Pos	Team	Pld	W	D	L	GF	GA	GD	Pts	Qualification
1	Norway	3	2	1	0	9	4	+5	7	Semi-finals
2	Brazil	3	1	2	0	5	3	+2	5	Semi-finals
3	Germany	3	1	1	1	6	6	0	4	
4	Japan	3	0	0	3	2	9	−7	0	

Source: FIFA
Rules for classification: Tiebreakers

== Matches ==
=== Germany vs Japan ===
21 July 1996
13:30

Germany	3–2	Japan
Wiegmann 5'; Tomei 29' (o.g.); Mohr 52'	Report (FIFA)	Kioka 18'; Noda 33'

Legion Field, Birmingham, Alabama
Attendance: 44,211
Referee: Sonia Denoncourt (Canada)

=== Norway vs Brazil ===
21 July 1996
15:00

Norway	2–2	Brazil
Medalen 32'; Aarønes 68'	Report (FIFA)	Pretinha 57', 89'

Robert F. Kennedy Stadium, Washington, D.C.
Attendance: 45,946
Referee: José María García-Aranda (Spain)

=== Brazil vs Japan ===
23 July 1996
16:30

Brazil	2–0	Japan
Kátia 68'; Pretinha 78'	Report (FIFA)

Legion Field, Birmingham, Alabama
Attendance: 26,111
Referee: Ingrid Jonsson (Sweden)

=== Norway vs Germany ===
23 July 1996
18:30

Norway	3–2	Germany
Aarønes 5'; Medalen 34'; Riise 65'	Report (FIFA)	Wiegmann 32'; Prinz 62'

Robert F. Kennedy Stadium, Washington, D.C.
Attendance: 28,000
Referee: Edward McGregor Lennie (Australia)

=== Brazil vs Germany ===
25 July 1996
18:30

Brazil	1–1	Germany
Sissi 53'	Report (FIFA)	Wunderlich 4'

Legion Field, Birmingham, Alabama
Attendance: 28,319
Referee: Sonia Denoncourt (Canada)

=== Norway vs Japan ===
25 July 1996
18:30

Norway	4–0	Japan
Pettersen 25', 86'; Medalen 60'; Tangeraas 74'	Report (FIFA)

Robert F. Kennedy Stadium, Washington, D.C.
Attendance: 30,237
Referee: Omar Al-Mehanna (Saudi Arabia)
