= Football at the 1996 Summer Olympics – Women's tournament =

1996 Women's Olympic Football Tournament

Tournament details
- Host country: United States
- Dates: July 21 – August 1
- Teams: 8 (from 4 confederations)
- Venues: 5 (in 5 host cities)

Final positions
- Champions: United States (1st title)
- Runners-up: China
- Third place: Norway
- Fourth place: Brazil

Tournament statistics
- Matches played: 16
- Goals scored: 53 (3.31 per match)
- Attendance: 691,762 (43,235 per match)
- Top scorer(s): (Brazil) Pretinha (Norway) Ann Kristin Aarønes (Norway) Linda Medalen (4 goals each)
- Fair play award: United States

The 1996 Summer Olympics—based in Atlanta, Georgia, United States—marked the first time that women participated in the Olympic association football tournament. The tournament featured eight women's national teams from four continental confederations. The teams were drawn into two groups of four and each group played a round-robin tournament (which was held in Miami, Florida, Orlando, Florida, Birmingham, Alabama and Washington, D.C.). At the end of the group stage, the top two teams advanced to the knockout stage (which was held at Sanford Stadium in Athens, Georgia), beginning with the semi-finals and culminating with the gold medal match on August 1, 1996.

The United States became the inaugural champion after a 2–1 victory against China in the gold medal game.

== Competition schedule ==
G	Group stage	½	Semifinals	B	3rd place play-off	F	Final

Sun 21	Mon 22	Tue 23	Wed 24	Thu 25	Fri 26	Sat 27	Sun 28	Mon 29	Tue 30	Wed 31	Thu 1	
G		G		G			½				B	F

== Qualification ==
The qualification system for the inaugural women's football tournament was based on the results of the 1995 FIFA Women's World Cup. Seven best teams and the host nation were qualified for the tournament. As the third-ranked United States team was already qualified as the host, its spot was passed down to the eighth-ranked team, Japan. England was ranked seventh, but due to it not being an IOC member, its spot was passed down to the ninth-ranked Brazil.

- Asia (AFC)
  - China
  - Japan
- South America (CONMEBOL)
  - Brazil
- Europe (UEFA)
  - Denmark
  - Germany
  - Norway
  - Sweden
- North and Central America (CONCACAF)
  - United States – host nation

== Venues ==
The tournament was held in five stadiums across five cities:

Athens, Georgia	Birmingham, Alabama	Miami, Florida	Football at the 1996 Summer Olympics – Women's tournament is located in the United States
Sanford Stadium	Legion Field	Orange Bowl	Football at the 1996 Summer Olympics – Women's tournament is located in the United States
Capacity: 86,100	Capacity: 81,700	Capacity: 74,476	Football at the 1996 Summer Olympics – Women's tournament is located in the United States
Orlando, Florida		Washington, D.C.	Football at the 1996 Summer Olympics – Women's tournament is located in the United States
Citrus Bowl		Robert F. Kennedy Stadium	Football at the 1996 Summer Olympics – Women's tournament is located in the United States
Capacity: 65,000		Capacity: 56,500	Football at the 1996 Summer Olympics – Women's tournament is located in the United States

== Match officials ==
Referees
Confederation	Referee
Female officials
CONCACAF	Sonia Denoncourt (Canada)
CONMEBOL	Cláudia Vasconcelos (Brazil)
UEFA	Ingrid Jonsson (Sweden)
UEFA	Bente Skogvang (Norway)
Male officials
AFC	Omer Al Mehannah (Saudi Arabia)
CAF	Gamal Al-Ghandour (Egypt)
CONCACAF	Benito Archundia (Mexico)
OFC	Eddie Lennie (Australia)
UEFA	Pierluigi Collina (Italy)
UEFA	José María García-Aranda (Spain)

Fourth officials
Confederation	Referee
Male officials
AFC	Pirom Un-prasert (Thailand)
CONMEBOL	Antônio Pereira (Brazil)
CONMEBOL	Roberto Ruscio (Argentina)

Assistant referees
Confederation	Assistant referee
Female officials
CONCACAF	Janice Gettemeyer (United States)
CONCACAF	María del Socorro Rodríguez (Mexico)
UEFA	Gitte Holm (Denmark)
UEFA	Nelly Viennot (France)
Male officials
AFC	Jeon Young-hyun (South Korea)
AFC	Mohamed Al-Musawi (Oman)
CAF	Dramane Dante (Mali)
CAF	Amir Osman Mohamed Hamid (Sudan)
CONCACAF	Peter Kelly (Trinidad and Tobago)
CONMEBOL	Jorge Luis Arango (Colombia)
CONMEBOL	Carlos Velázquez (Uruguay)
OFC	Lencie Fred (Vanuatu)
UEFA	Yuri Dupanov (Belarus)

== Group stage ==
=== Group E ===
Pos	Team	Pld	W	D	L	GF	GA	GD	Pts	Qualification
1	China	3	2	1	0	7	1	+6	7	Semi-finals
2	United States (H)	3	2	1	0	5	1	+4	7	Semi-finals
3	Sweden	3	1	0	2	4	5	−1	3	
4	Denmark	3	0	0	3	2	11	−9	0	

Source: FIFA
Rules for classification: Tiebreakers
(H) Hosts
21 July 1996
16:00

United States	3–0	Denmark
Venturini 37'; Hamm 41'; Milbrett 49'	Report (FIFA)

Citrus Bowl, Orlando, Florida
Attendance: 25,303
Referee: Cláudia de Vasconcellos (Brazil)
21 July 1996
16:00

Sweden	0–2	China
	Report (FIFA)	Shi Guihong 31'; Zhao Lihong 32'

Orange Bowl, Miami, Florida
Attendance: 46,724
Referee: Gamal Al-Ghandour (Egypt)

23 July 1996
18:00

United States	2–1	Sweden
Venturini 15'; MacMillan 62'	Report (FIFA)	Overbeck 64' (o.g.)

Citrus Bowl, Orlando, Florida
Attendance: 28,000
Referee: Bente Ovedie Skogvang (Norway)
23 July 1996
16:00

Denmark	1–5	China
Madsen 55'	Report (FIFA)	Shi Guihong 10'; Liu Ailing 49'; Sun Qingmei 29', 59'; Fan Yunjie 36'

Orange Bowl, Miami, Florida
Attendance: 34,871
Referee: Benito Archundia (Mexico)

25 July 1996
18:30

United States	0–0	China
	Report (FIFA)

Orange Bowl, Miami, Florida
Attendance: 55,650
Referee: Pierluigi Collina (Italy)
25 July 1996
18:30

Denmark	1–3	Sweden
Jensen 90'	Report (FIFA)	Swedberg 62', 68'; Videkull 76'

Citrus Bowl, Orlando, Florida
Attendance: 17,020
Referee: Cláudia de Vasconcellos (Brazil)

=== Group F ===
Pos	Team	Pld	W	D	L	GF	GA	GD	Pts	Qualification
1	Norway	3	2	1	0	9	4	+5	7	Semi-finals
2	Brazil	3	1	2	0	5	3	+2	5	Semi-finals
3	Germany	3	1	1	1	6	6	0	4	
4	Japan	3	0	0	3	2	9	−7	0	

Source: FIFA
Rules for classification: Tiebreakers
21 July 1996
13:30

Germany	3–2	Japan
Wiegmann 5'; Tomei 29' (o.g.); Mohr 52'	Report (FIFA)	Kioka 18'; Noda 33'

Legion Field, Birmingham, Alabama
Attendance: 44,211
Referee: Sonia Denoncourt (Canada)
21 July 1996
15:00

Norway	2–2	Brazil
Medalen 32'; Aarønes 68'	Report (FIFA)	Pretinha 57', 89'

Robert F. Kennedy Stadium, Washington, D.C.
Attendance: 45,946
Referee: José María García-Aranda (Spain)

23 July 1996
16:30

Brazil	2–0	Japan
Kátia 68'; Pretinha 78'	Report (FIFA)

Legion Field, Birmingham, Alabama
Attendance: 26,111
Referee: Ingrid Jonsson (Sweden)
23 July 1996
18:30

Norway	3–2	Germany
Aarønes 5'; Medalen 34'; Riise 65'	Report (FIFA)	Wiegmann 32'; Prinz 62'

Robert F. Kennedy Stadium, Washington, D.C.
Attendance: 28,000
Referee: Edward McGregor Lennie (Australia)

25 July 1996
18:30

Brazil	1–1	Germany
Sissi 53'	Report (FIFA)	Wunderlich 4'

Legion Field, Birmingham, Alabama
Attendance: 28,319
Referee: Sonia Denoncourt (Canada)
25 July 1996
18:30

Norway	4–0	Japan
Pettersen 25', 86'; Medalen 60'; Tangeraas 74'	Report (FIFA)

Robert F. Kennedy Stadium, Washington, D.C.
Attendance: 30,237
Referee: Omar Al-Mehanna (Saudi Arabia)

== Knockout stage ==
Semi-finals
July 28 – Athens, GA
China	3
Brazil	2
July 28 – Athens, GA
Norway	1
United States (AET)	2

Final
August 1 – Athens, GA
China	1
United States	2
Third place
August 1 – Athens, GA
Brazil	0
Norway	2

=== Semi-finals ===
28 July 1996

China	3–2	Brazil
Qingmei 5'; Haiying 83', 90'	Report	Roseli 67'; Pretinha 72'

Sanford Stadium, Athens, Georgia
Attendance: 64,196
Referee: Ingrid Jonsson (Sweden)
28 July 1996

Norway	1–2 (a.e.t./g.g.)	United States
Medalen 18'	Report	Akers 76' (pen.); MacMillan 100'

Sanford Stadium, Athens, Georgia
Attendance: 64,196
Referee: Sonia Denoncourt (Canada)

=== Bronze medal match ===
1 August 1996

Brazil	0–2	Norway
	Report	Aarønes 21', 25'

Sanford Stadium, Athens, Georgia
Attendance: 76,489
Referee: Ingrid Jonsson (Sweden)

=== Gold medal match ===
1 August 1996

China	1–2	United States
Sun 32'	Report	MacMillan 19'; Milbrett 68'

Sanford Stadium, Athens, Georgia
Attendance: 76,489
Referee: Bente Ovedie Skogvang (Norway)

== Statistics ==
=== Goalscorers ===
There were 53 goals scored in 16 matches, for an average of 3.31 goals per match. Brazil's Pretinha and Norway's Ann Kristin Aarønes and Linda Medalen finished as the top scorers of the tournament, with each scoring four goals.

4 goals

- (Brazil) Pretinha
- (Norway) Ann Kristin Aarønes
- (Norway) Linda Medalen

3 goals

- (China) Sun Qingmei
- (United States) Shannon MacMillan

2 goals

- (China) Shi Guihong
- (China) Wei Haiying
- (Germany) Bettina Wiegmann
- (Norway) Marianne Pettersen
- (Sweden) Malin Swedberg
- (United States) Tiffeny Milbrett
- (United States) Tisha Venturini

1 goal

- (Brazil) Kátia
- (Brazil) Roseli
- (Brazil) Sissi
- (China) Fan Yunjie
- (China) Liu Ailing
- (China) Sun Wen
- (China) Zhao Lihong
- (Denmark) Helle Jensen
- (Denmark) Lene Madsen
- (Germany) Heidi Mohr
- (Germany) Birgit Prinz
- (Germany) Pia Wunderlich
- (Japan) Futaba Kioka
- (Japan) Akemi Noda
- (Norway) Hege Riise
- (Norway) Trine Tangeraas
- (Sweden) Lena Videkull
- (United States) Michelle Akers
- (United States) Mia Hamm

1 own goal

- (Japan) Yumi Tomei (against Germany)
- (United States) Carla Overbeck (against Sweden)

Source: FIFA

=== Assists ===
4 assists

- (Brazil) Roseli
- (China) Sun Qingmei

2 assists

- (China) Shi Guihong
- (Norway) Linda Medalen

1 assist

- (Brazil) Fanta
- (China) Fan Yunjie
- (China) Sun Wen
- (China) Zhao Lihong
- (Denmark) Lisbet Kolding
- (Denmark) Gitte Krogh
- (Denmark) Lene Madsen
- (Germany) Martina Voss
- (Japan) Futaba Kioka
- (Norway) Agnete Carlsen
- (Norway) Gro Espeseth
- (Norway) Hege Riise
- (Norway) Brit Sandaune
- (Norway) Tina Svensson
- (Norway) Trine Tangeraas
- (Sweden) Kristin Bengtsson
- (Sweden) Ulrika Kalte
- (Sweden) Pia Sundhage
- (United States) Michelle Akers
- (United States) Julie Foudy
- (United States) Mia Hamm
- (United States) Kristine Lilly

Source: FIFA

=== FIFA Fair Play Award ===
- Winner: United States

The United States won the FIFA Fair Play Award, given to the team with the best record of fair play during the tournament.

=== Tournament ranking ===
Per statistical convention in football, matches decided in extra time are counted as wins and losses, while matches decided by penalty shoot-outs are counted as draws.

Pos	Grp	Team	Pld	W	D	L	GF	GA	GD	Pts	Final result
1	E	United States (H)	5	4	1	0	9	3	+6	13	Gold medal
2	E	China	5	3	1	1	11	5	+6	10	Silver medal
3	F	Norway	5	3	1	1	12	6	+6	10	Bronze medal
4	F	Brazil	5	1	2	2	7	8	−1	5	Fourth place
5	F	Germany	3	1	1	1	6	6	0	4	Eliminated in group stage
6	E	Sweden	3	1	0	2	4	5	−1	3	Eliminated in group stage
7	F	Japan	3	0	0	3	2	9	−7	0	Eliminated in group stage
8	E	Denmark	3	0	0	3	2	11	−9	0	Eliminated in group stage

Source: FIFA
(H) Hosts
