= FIFA Women's World Cup referees =

FIFA Women's World Cup referees are FIFA international referees who officiate at the FIFA Women's World Cup matches.

== World Cup Final match officials ==
Year	Referee	Assistant Referees	Reserve Referees and Assistant Referees	Video Assistant Referees (VARs) and Assistant VARs
1991	(Soviet Union); Vadim Zhuk	(Sweden); Ingrid Jonsson (Germany); Gertrud Regus	Reserve Referees since 1999 Reserve Assistant Referees since 2015	Video Assistant Referees (VARs) and Assistant VARs since 2019
1995	(Sweden); Ingrid Jonsson	(Denmark); Gitte Holm (Mexico); Maria Rodríguez	Reserve Referees since 1999 Reserve Assistant Referees since 2015	Video Assistant Referees (VARs) and Assistant VARs since 2019
1999	(Switzerland); Nicole Petignat	(France); Ghislaine Labbe (Peru); Ana Pérez	(Finland); Katriina Elovirta	Video Assistant Referees (VARs) and Assistant VARs since 2019
2003	(Romania); Cristina Ionescu	(Romania); Irina Mirt (Poland); Katarzyna Wierzbowska	(Canada); Sonia Denoncourt	Video Assistant Referees (VARs) and Assistant VARs since 2019
2007	(Australia); Tammy Ogston	(Mexico); Rita Muñoz (Mexico); María Isabel Tovar	(Japan); Mayumi Oiwa	Video Assistant Referees (VARs) and Assistant VARs since 2019
2011	(Germany); Bibiana Steinhaus	(Germany); Katrin Rafalski (Germany); Marina Wozniak	(Sweden); Jenny Palmqvist	Video Assistant Referees (VARs) and Assistant VARs since 2019
2015	(Ukraine); Kateryna Monzul	(Spain); Yolanda Parga (Ukraine); Nataliya Rachynska	(Uruguay); Claudia Umpiérrez (Chile); Loreto Toloza	Video Assistant Referees (VARs) and Assistant VARs since 2019
2019	(France); Stéphanie Frappart	(France); Manuela Nicolosi (Republic of Ireland); Michelle O'Neill	(Uruguay); Claudia Umpiérrez (Uruguay); Luciana Mascaraña	(Spain); Carlos del Cerro Grande (Spain); José María Sánchez Martínez (Argentina); Mariana de Almeida
2023	(United States); Tori Penso	(United States); Brooke Mayo (United States); Kathryn Nesbitt	(Japan); Yoshimi Yamashita (Suriname); Mijensa Rensch	(Nicaragua); Tatiana Guzmán (Netherlands); Pol van Boekel (Belgium); Ella De Vries (United States); Armando Villarreal

=== By country ===
As of the 2023 FIFA Women's World Cup final, 25 countries have been represented in the officials body of the FIFA Women's World Cup Final.

Country	Total	Referees	Assistant Referees	Reserve Referees	Reserve Assistant Referees	VARs	Assistant VARs
Germany	4	1	3	0	0	0	0
United States	4	1	2	0	0	0	1
France	3	1	2	0	0	0	0
Mexico	3	0	3	0	0	0	0
Spain	3	0	1	0	0	1	1
Sweden	3	1	1	1	0	0	0
Uruguay	3	0	0	2	1	0	0
Japan	2	0	0	2	0	0	0
Romania	2	1	1	0	0	0	0
Ukraine	2	1	1	0	0	0	0
Argentina	1	0	0	0	0	0	1
Australia	1	1	0	0	0	0	0
Belgium	1	0	0	0	0	0	1
Canada	1	0	0	1	0	0	0
Chile	1	0	0	0	1	0	0
Denmark	1	0	1	0	0	0	0
Finland	1	0	0	1	0	0	0
Netherlands	1	0	0	0	0	0	1
Nicaragua	1	0	0	0	0	1	0
Peru	1	0	1	0	0	0	0
Poland	1	0	1	0	0	0	0
Republic of Ireland	1	0	1	0	0	0	0
Soviet Union	1	1	0	0	0	0	0
Suriname	1	0	0	0	1	0	0
Switzerland	1	1	0	0	0	0	0

=== By confederation ===
Confederation	Total	Referees	Assistant Referees	Reserve Referees	Reserve Assistant Referees	VARs	Assistant VARs
UEFA	25	7	12	2	0	1	3
CONCACAF	10	1	5	1	1	1	1
CONMEBOL	6	0	1	2	2	0	1
AFC	3	1	0	2	0	0	0
CAF	0	0	0	0	0	0	0
OFC	0	0	0	0	0	0	0
Totals:	44	9	18	7	3	2	5

== Number of matches ==
There are 11 referees who have managed seven or more matches:

10 matches:

- (Switzerland) Nicole Petignat (1999, 2003, 2007)
- (France) Stéphanie Frappart (2015, 2019, 2023)

9 matches:

- (Canada) Sonia Denoncourt (1995, 1999, 2003)
- (Australia) Tammy Ogston (1999, 2003, 2007)
- (United States) Kari Seitz (1999, 2003, 2007, 2011)
- (New Zealand) Anna-Marie Keighley (2015, 2019, 2023)
- (Ukraine) Kateryna Monzul (2015, 2019, 2023)

8 matches:

- (Brazil) Edina Alves Batista (2019, 2023)

7 matches:

- (South Korea) Im Eun-ju (1999, 2003)
- (Canada) Carol Chénard (2011, 2015)
- (Honduras) Melissa Borjas (2015, 2019, 2023)
