= Football at the 1996 Summer Olympics – Women's qualification =

Eight teams competed in the women's football tournament at the 1996 Summer Olympics. In addition to the host nation, the United States, seven other teams qualified for the tournament based on the results from the 1995 FIFA Women's World Cup.

== Method ==
Unlike the men's competition, there was no fixed slot allocation for the women's tournament. Instead, the 1995 FIFA Women's World Cup would be used as the preliminary competition to qualify teams for the inaugural women's Olympic football tournament, which featured eight teams. The United States automatically qualified for the tournament as hosts, leaving seven spots to be determined by the Women's World Cup. Teams were ranked based on their results in the tournament, with the top seven teams in the ranking qualifying for the Olympics (excluding the United States and England, a non-IOC member).

== 1995 FIFA Women's World Cup ==
=== Qualification ===
Twelve teams qualified for the 1995 FIFA Women's World Cup in Sweden based on a fixed slot allocation.

Confederation	Slots	Tournament	Teams qualified
AFC (Asia)	2	Football at the 1994 Asian Games – Women's tournament	China; Japan
CAF (Africa)	1	1995 African Women's Championship	Nigeria
CONCACAF (North America, Central America and the Caribbean)	2	1994 CONCACAF Women's Championship	Canada; United States
CONMEBOL (South America)	1	1995 South American Women's Football Championship	Brazil
OFC (Oceania)	1	1994 OFC Women's Championship	Australia
UEFA (Europe)	5	Host country	Sweden
UEFA (Europe)	5	UEFA Women's Euro 1995	Denmark; England; Germany; Norway

=== Group stage ===
Group A

Pos	Team	Pld	Pts
1	Germany	3	6
2	Sweden (H)	3	6
3	Japan	3	3
4	Brazil	3	3

Source: FIFA
(H) Hosts
Group B

Pos	Team	Pld	Pts
1	Norway	3	9
2	England	3	6
3	Canada	3	1
4	Nigeria	3	1

Source: FIFA
Group C

Pos	Team	Pld	Pts
1	United States	3	7
2	China	3	7
3	Denmark	3	3
4	Australia	3	0

Source: FIFA

Ranking of third-placed teams

Pos	Team	Pld	Pts
1	Denmark	3	3
2	Japan	3	3
3	Canada	3	1

Source: FIFA

=== Knockout stage ===
Quarter-finals
13 June – Västerås
Germany	3
England	0
13 June – Helsingborg
Sweden	1 (3)
China (p)	1 (4)
13 June – Gävle
Japan	0
United States	4
13 June – Karlstad
Norway	3
Denmark	1

Semi-finals
15 June – Helsingborg
Germany	1
China	0
15 June – Västerås
United States	0
Norway	1

Final
18 June – Solna
Germany	0
Norway	2
Third place play-off
17 June – Gävle
China	0
United States	2

== Ranking of teams ==
Teams were ranked by the round/place which they reached, and then by points, goal difference and goals scored. Teams eliminated in the quarter-finals are ranked by their quarter-final goal differential. Per statistical convention in football, matches decided in extra time are counted as wins and losses, while matches decided by penalty shoot-outs are counted as draws.

Pos	Grp	Team	Pld	W	D	L	GF	GA	GD	Pts	Qualification
1	B	Norway	6	6	0	0	23	1	+22	18	Qualified for the 1996 Summer Olympics
2	A	Germany	6	4	0	2	13	6	+7	12	Qualified for the 1996 Summer Olympics
3	C	United States	6	4	1	1	15	5	+10	13	Automatically qualified (host)
4	C	China	6	2	2	2	11	10	+1	8	Qualified for the 1996 Summer Olympics
5	A	Sweden	4	2	1	1	6	4	+2	7	Qualified for the 1996 Summer Olympics
6	C	Denmark	4	1	0	3	7	8	−1	3	Qualified for the 1996 Summer Olympics
7	B	England	4	2	0	2	6	9	−3	6	Ineligible (not an IOC member)
8	A	Japan	4	1	0	3	2	8	−6	3	Qualified for the 1996 Summer Olympics
9	A	Brazil	3	1	0	2	3	8	−5	3	Qualified for the 1996 Summer Olympics
10	B	Canada	3	0	1	2	5	13	−8	1	
11	B	Nigeria	3	0	1	2	5	14	−9	1	
12	C	Australia	3	0	0	3	3	13	−10	0	

Source: FIFA Technical Report

== Qualified teams ==
Team	Confederation	Qualified as	Qualified on
United States	CONCACAF	Host	18 September 1993
Norway	UEFA	Women's World Cup winner	9 June 1995
Germany	UEFA	Women's World Cup runner-up	9 June 1995
China	AFC	Women's World Cup fourth-place	9 June 1995
Sweden	UEFA	Women's World Cup fifth-place	9 June 1995
Denmark	UEFA	Women's World Cup sixth-place	10 June 1995
Japan	AFC	Women's World Cup eighth-place	10 June 1995
Brazil	CONMEBOL	Women's World Cup ninth-place	10 June 1995

=== Breakdown by confederation ===
No teams from Africa (CAF) or Oceania (OFC) managed to qualify for the Olympic tournament.

Confederation	Teams qualified
AFC	2
CAF	0
CONCACAF	1
CONMEBOL	1
OFC	0
UEFA	4
