= Afo Dodoo =

Ghanaian former footballer

Personal information
- Date of birth: 23 November 1973 (age 52)
- Place of birth: Ghana
- Height: 1.78 m (5 ft 10 in)
- Position: Defender

Senior career*
Years	Team	Apps	(Gls)
1992–1995	Ashanti Gold	?	(?)
1995–1998	Kalamata	64	(2)
1999	Tromsø	0	(0)
1999–2000	Enköping	32	(1)
2001–2003	Landskrona	27	(0)

International career
1994–1996	Ghana	23	(0)
- * Club domestic league appearances and goals

Afo Dodoo (born 23 November 1973) is a Ghanaian former footballer who played at both professional and international levels as a defender.

== Career ==
=== Club career ===
Dodoo began his career in Ghana with Ashanti Gold, before moving to Greece in 1995 to play with Kalamata, He moved to Norway to play with Tromsø, making one cup appearance in May 1999, before ending his career in Sweden with Enköping and Landskrona.

=== International career ===
Dodoo earned a total of 23 caps for the Ghanaian national side between 1994 and 1996. He participated at the African Cup of Nations in 1994 and 1996, and made four appearances at the 1996 Olympics.
