= Christian Saba =

Ghanaian footballer

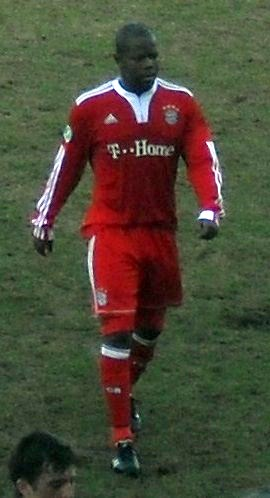
- Saba in action for Bayern Munich II

Personal information
- Date of birth: 29 December 1978 (age 47)
- Place of birth: Accra, Ghana
- Height: 1.85 m (6 ft 1 in)
- Position: Centre-back

Team information
- Current team: Bayern Munich U19 (team manager)

Youth career
- King Harrison
- 1994–1995: Hearts of Oak
- 1995–1996: Bayern Munich

Senior career*
Years	Team	Apps	(Gls)
1996–2011	Bayern Munich II	285	(8)
1997–2000	Bayern Munich	0	(0)
1998–1999	→ Hertha BSC (loan)	1	(0)
1999–2000	→ Arminia Bielefeld (loan)	0	(0)
2012–2014	1906 Haidhausen		
Total		286	(8)

International career
	Ghana U17	9	(1)
1996	Ghana U23		
1996–1997	Ghana	4	(0)

Managerial career
- 2015–2019: Bayern Munich U16 (assistant)
- 2019–2021: Bayern Munich U19 (assistant)
- 2021–: Bayern Munich U19 (team manager)
Medal record
Bayern Munich
Winner	DFB Liga-Pokal	1997
Winner	DFB-Pokal	1998
Bayern Munich II
Winner	Regionalliga Süd	2004
Ghana
Winner	FIFA U-17 World Championship	1995
- * Club domestic league appearances and goals

Christian Saba (born 29 December 1978) is a Ghanaian former professional footballer who played as a central defender. He is the team official of Bayern Munich U19.

One of the most lengthy tenures of any foreign player with a sole team, he was never able however to make it past the reserves of Bayern Munich.

== Club career ==
Saba was born in Accra. After appearing in his country for local King Harrison Accra and Accra Hearts of Oak.

Saba joined Bayern Munich's youth system in 1995 at the age of 16, alongside compatriot Emanuel Bentil. Neither was able to break into the first team, but the former did manage to stay with the club, playing for the reserves and being an occasional standby player for the main squad.

Saba's debut in the Bundesliga occurred not with Bayern, but with Hertha BSC, where he was on loan for 1998–99: on 29 May 1999, in the season's closer, he played ten minutes in a 6–1 home routing of Hamburger SV in what would be his only top flight appearance. The following campaign he was loaned to Arminia Bielefeld, but he did not collect one single minute of action and the team was also relegated from the top level.

From 2000 onwards Saba remained a defensive stalwart for Bayern's second team, which competed in Regionalliga Süd. He was released in June 2011 at nearly 33, after 16 years with the club.

== International career ==
Saba was selected for Ghana's under-23 team for the 1996 Summer Olympics, alongside Bayern teammate Samuel Kuffour, and scored twice against Italy in the group stages, helping qualify the African precisely at the expense of the Europeans.

== Personal life ==
His brother Robert Saba was also a footballer who played for Accra Hearts of Oak. The duo lost their father Daniel Saba in 2017.

== Honours ==
Bayern Munich II

- IFA Shield: 2005

Maccabi Netanya

- Liga Leumit: 2013–14

Ghana U17

- FIFA U-17 World Championship: 1995
