= Malin Swedberg =

Swedish footballer

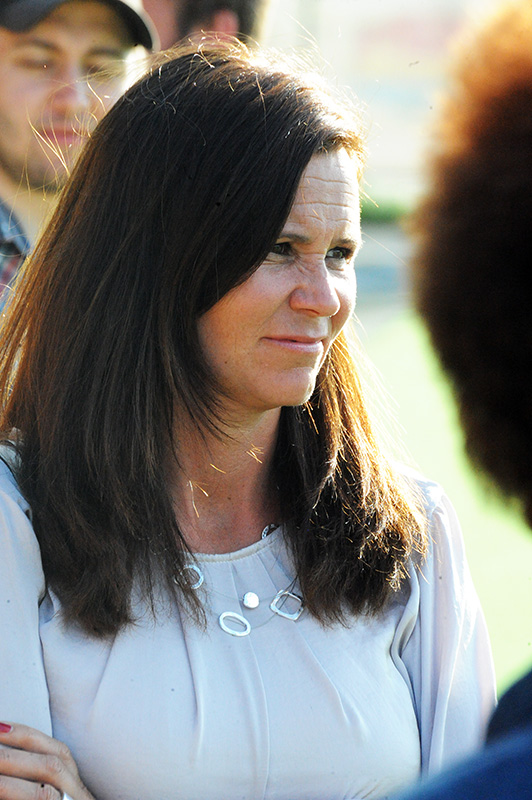
- Swedberg in 2014

Personal information
- Date of birth: September 15, 1968 (age 58)
- Place of birth: Stockholm, Sweden
- Height: 1.71 m (5 ft 7 in)
- Position: Midfielder

Senior career*
Years	Team	Apps	(Gls)
1991	Djurgårdens IF		
1992–1999	Älvsjö AIK		
- Sundbybergs IK
- Södersnäckornas BK

International career
1989–2000	Sweden	78	(10)
- * Club domestic league appearances and goals

Malin Swedberg (born 15 September 1968) is a Swedish former football midfielder who won 78 caps for the Sweden women's national team, scoring ten goals. She represented Sweden at the inaugural FIFA Women's World Cup in 1991; as well as in the Olympic women's football tournament in 1996 and 2000.

Since retiring Swedberg has gone into television punditry and worked as a commentator on Eurosport and TV4.

== Club career ==
As a 19-year-old, Swedberg signed a professional contract with Napoli. She only stayed in Italy for three months.

== International career ==
Swedberg made her senior Sweden debut in March 1989; a 2–1 win over France. In 1991 she helped Sweden to a third-place finish at the inaugural FIFA Women's World Cup. Swedberg collected the Diamantbollen award for the best female footballer in the country in 1996. At that year's Olympic Football Tournament, she had scored twice in Sweden's 3–1 group stage win over Denmark.

== International goals ==
No.	Date	Venue	Opponent	Score	Result	Competition
1.	11 March 1996	Lagos, Portugal	Denmark	2–0	2–1	1996 Algarve Cup
2.	2 June 1996	Gandia, Spain	Spain	3–0	8–0	UEFA Women's Euro 1997 qualifying
3.	26 June 1996	Câmpina, Romania	Romania	1–0	5–0	UEFA Women's Euro 1997 qualifying
4.	25 July 1996	Miami, United States	Denmark	1–0	3–1	1996 Summer Olympics
5.	25 July 1996	Miami, United States	Denmark	2–0	3–1	1996 Summer Olympics
6.	9 October 1996	Messina, Italy	Italy	1–0	1–0	Friendly
7.	12 March 1997	Lagoa, Portugal	Portugal	2–0	4–0	1997 Algarve Cup
8.	12 March 1997	Lagoa, Portugal	Portugal	4–0	4–0	1997 Algarve Cup
9.	21 May 1997	Falköping, Sweden	Russia	2–0	2–0	Friendly

== Personal life ==
Since 1996, Swedberg has worked as a police officer. She is married to Hans Eskilsson and has two children, including Williot Swedberg who is also a professional footballer.
