= Fukuyama Tsuun Rose Stadium =

Athletic stadium in Fukuyama, Japan

Coordinates: 34°26′27″N 133°23′43″E

Fukuyama Stadium
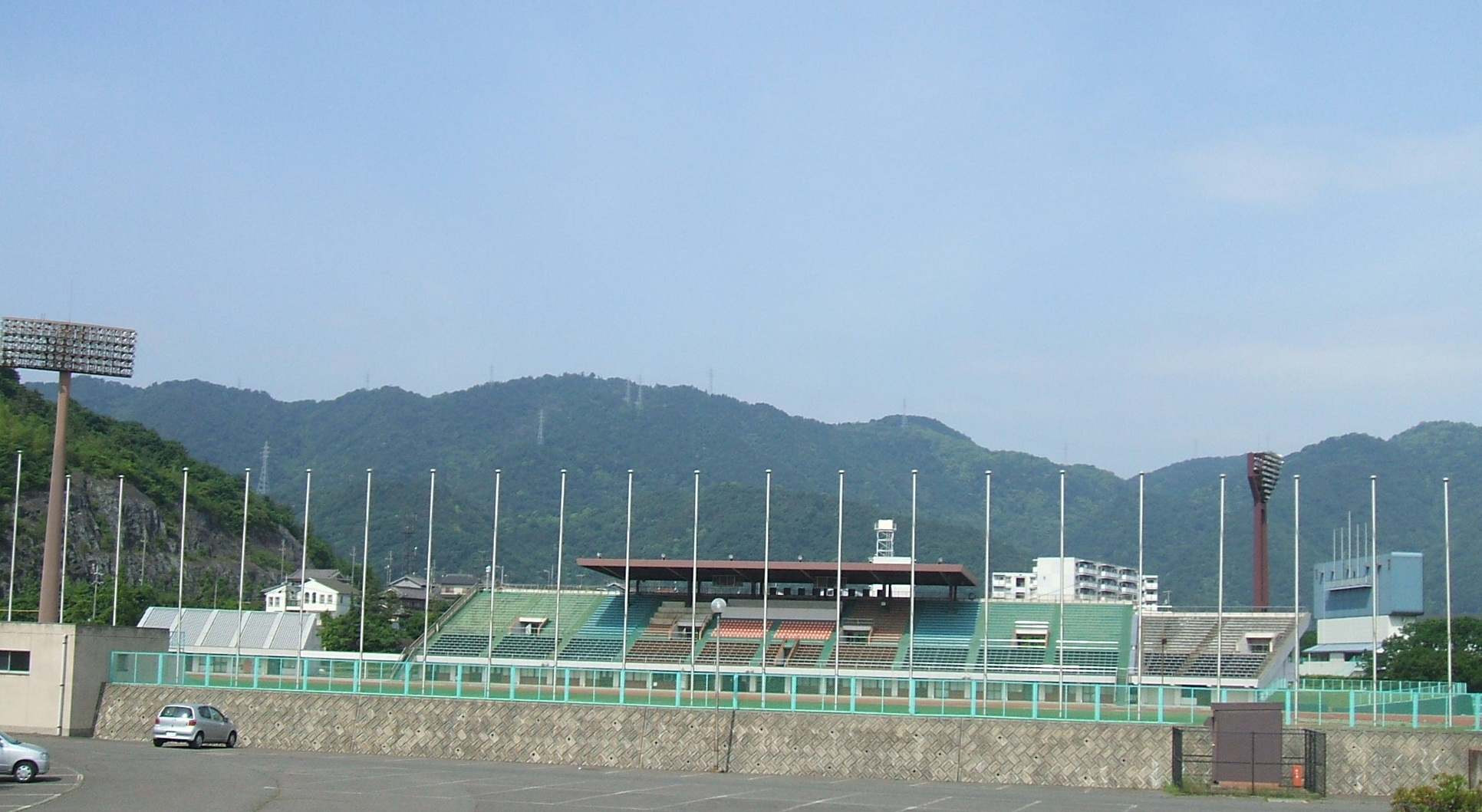
- Interactive map of Fukuyama Stadium
- Location: Fukuyama, Hiroshima, Japan
- Owner: Fukuyama City
- Capacity: 10,081

Construction
- Opened: 1978

Fukuyama Stadium (福山市竹ヶ端運動公園陸上競技場, Fukuyama-shi Takegahana Undōkōen Rikujōkyōgijō) is an athletic stadium in Fukuyama, Hiroshima, Japan.
