= Kingsley Obiekwu =

Nigerian footballer

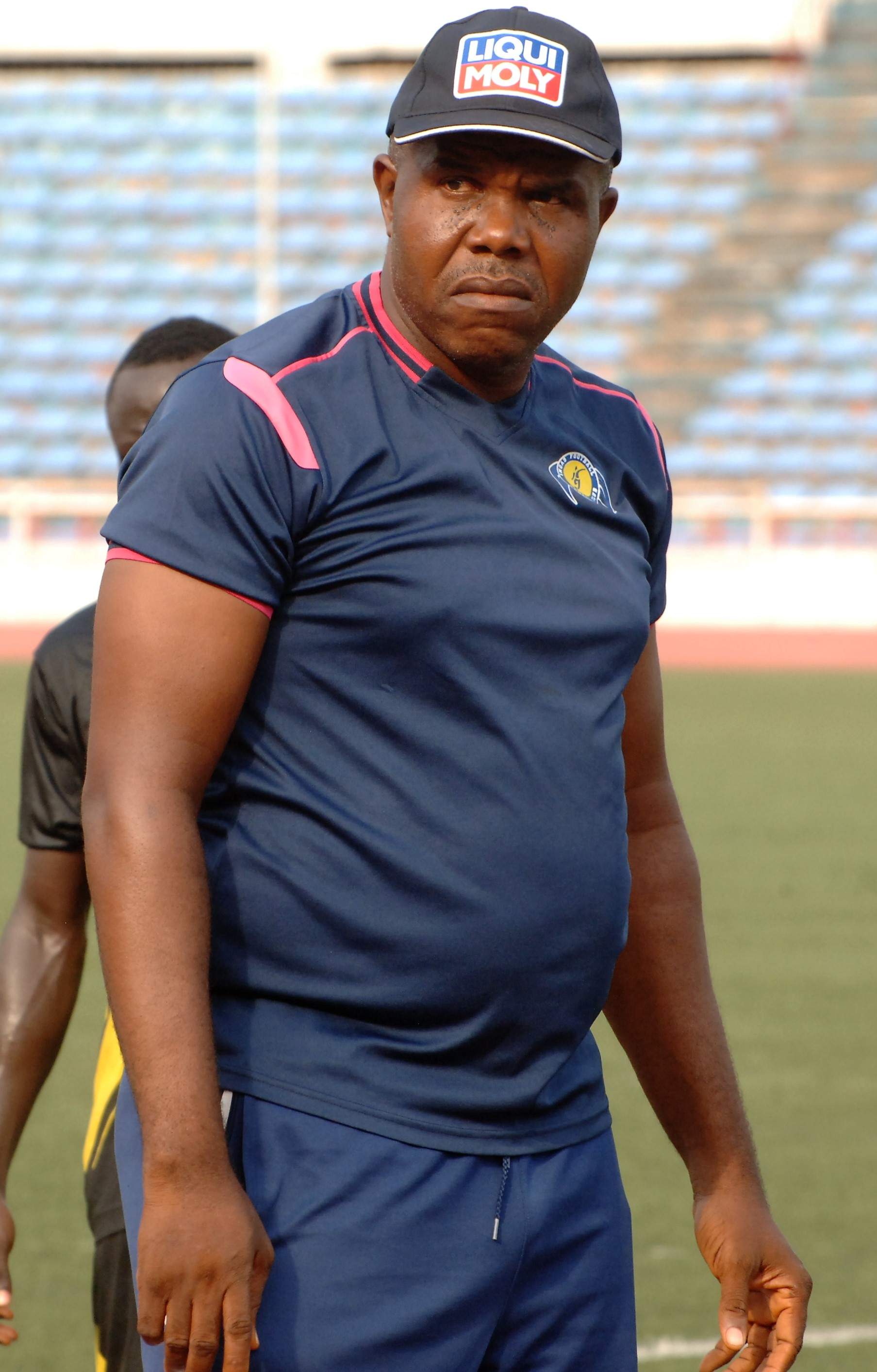

Personal information
- Date of birth: 12 November 1974 (age 51)
- Place of birth: Ibusa, Nigeria
- Position: Defender

Senior career*
Years	Team	Apps	(Gls)
1992–1995	Udoji United	?	(?)
1995–1998	Go Ahead Eagles	63	(7)
1998–2000	Al-Ahli	?	(?)
2000–2002	Enugu Rangers	?	(?)
2002–2003	Al-Masry	?	(?)
2003–2006	Enugu Rangers	?	(?)

International career
1996–1999	Nigeria	8	(0)

Managerial career
- 2012: USS Kraké
- 2009–2013: Ingas FC (Enugu)
Medal record
Representing Nigeria
Men's Football
Gold medal – first place	1996 Atlanta	Team competition
- * Club domestic league appearances and goals

Kingsley Obiekwu (born 12 November 1974) is a retired Nigerian footballer who played as a defender. He represented Nigeria at international level and was a member of the squad which won the gold medal at the 1996 Olympics in Atlanta. He coached Ingas F.C. of Enugu, Nigeria, between 2009 and 2013, after a brief stint with Benin side, USS Kraké.
