= Victor Ikpeba =

Nigerian footballer (born 1973)

Personal information
- Date of birth: 12 June 1973 (age 53)
- Place of birth: Benin City, Nigeria
- Height: 1.74 m (5 ft 9 in)
- Position: Forward

Senior career*
| Years | Team | Apps | (Gls) |
| 1989 | ACB Lagos | | |
| 1989–1993 | RFC Liège | 79 | (27) |
| 1993–1999 | Monaco | 170 | (55) |
| 1999–2002 | Borussia Dortmund | 30 | (3) |
| 2001–2002 | → Betis (loan) | 3 | (0) |
| 2002–2003 | Al-Ittihad Tripoli | 26 | (13) |
| 2004 | Charleroi | 15 | (5) |
| 2005 | Al Sadd | | |
| Total | | 323 | (103) |

International career
| 1996 | Nigeria U23 | 6 | (1) |
| 1992–2002 | Nigeria | 31 | (7) |
Medal record
Representing Nigeria
Men's Football
| Gold medal – first place | 1996 | Team competition |
- * Club domestic league appearances and goals

Victor Ikpeba (born 12 June 1973) is a Nigerian former professional footballer who played as a forward. Ikpeba played 31 international matches and scored seven goals for Nigeria. He was a member of Super Eagles team to the FIFA World Cups in 1994 but played and scored the lone goal against Bulgaria in the second game of the team at the 1998 FIFA World Cup. Ikpeba helped win the 1994 African Nations Cup and the Olympic football gold medal in 1996.

== Club career ==
Ikpeba was discovered by Belgian club RFC Liège during the 1989 FIFA U-17 World Championship, and moved to play in Belgium together with teammate Sunday Oliseh. At the age of 20 and after scoring 17 goals in 1992–93, Ikpeba was bought by Monégasque side AS Monaco, then coached by Arsène Wenger. At Monaco, he gradually became a success, albeit with a tough start. He showed outstanding form subsequent to the 1996 Olympics, scoring 13 league goals to help Monaco win the league title, and also finishing as the second-top goalscorer in the 1996–97 UEFA Cup. His performances earned him the African Footballer of the Year award in 1997. Two successful seasons followed. While at Monaco, Ikpeba nearly signed for Italian club Reggina. But his wife, unwilling to give up life in Monaco, locked him in their house on the day he was to sign his contract. Ikpeba played in Jean Tigana's talented Monaco side which famously put Manchester United out of the Champions League in 1998 on away goals after a 1–1 draw at Old Trafford.

Ikpeba again teamed up with Sunday Oliseh at Borussia Dortmund in 1999, for a transfer fee of £4.8 million. Ikpeba scored only two goals in his first season in the Bundesliga and barely played in his second, after falling out with the coach Matthias Sammer. Looking for a move abroad, Ikpeba turned down Southampton to join Real Betis on a season-long loan. Things went further downhill for the player in Spain as he was criticised for being overweight by the coach, after making just one appearance for the club. He didn't feature for Betis again up until the last two games of the season.

Ikpeba then signed a season-long contract with Libyan outfit Al-Ittihad Tripoli, but only played out half of his contract with the club, as he quit the team over financial disagreements. After leaving Libya and spending almost a year without a club, Ikpeba returned to Belgium, where he joined his former Liège coach at Charleroi. After helping the club avoid relegation, Ikpeba came very close to signing with German side SC Freiburg, but the deal fell through when it was revealed that the player had no EU passport. Ikpeba then had a short spell at Al Sadd in Qatar, before retiring from professional football.

== International career ==
Ikpeba made his debut for the Nigerian national team in 1992. He made his first international appearance on 25 January 1992 in the third-place play-off against Cameroon at the 1992 Africa Cup of Nations. Nigeria won 2–1 to finish third. In the same year, he also participated in the African qualifiers for the 1994 FIFA World Cup. He came on as a substitute in the match against South Africa on 10 October. On 16 January 1993, he also appeared in a qualifying match against South Africa.

Ikpeba represented Nigeria at the 1994 Africa Cup of Nations. He came on as a substitute in the group-stage match against Egypt in the 70th minute, with the match ending in a 0–0 draw. Nigeria subsequently defeated Ivory Coast in the semi-finals on penalties and beat Zambia 2–1 in the final to win the tournament. Ikpeba made one appearance in the competition and earned a winner's medal.

In the same year, he was included in Nigeria's squad for the 1994 FIFA World Cup. However, he did not feature in any of the group-stage matches against Bulgaria, Argentina and Greece, or in the round-of-16 match against Italy. Nigeria finished top of its group with two wins and one defeat before being eliminated by Italy after a 2–1 defeat in extra time.

In 1995, Ikpeba participated in the 1995 Afro-Asian Cup of Nations. He scored in the first leg against Uzbekistan on 21 October, helping Nigeria secure a 3–2 victory, and also played in the second leg on 10 November. Nigeria won the competition 4–2 on aggregate.

In 1996, he represented the Nigerian Olympic team in the football tournament at the 1996 Summer Olympics. Nigeria faced Hungary, Japan and Brazil in the group stage, then defeated Mexico in the quarter-finals and Brazil in the semi-finals to reach the final. Nigeria beat the Argentine Olympic team 3–2 in the final to win the gold medal. Ikpeba made six appearances and scored one goal during the tournament, helping Nigeria win its first-ever Olympic gold medal in men's football.

At the 1998 FIFA World Cup, Ikpeba played as a regular forward for Nigeria. He started the opening group-stage match against Spain on 13 June, helping his team secure a 3–2 victory. On 19 June, he scored the decisive goal in the 26th minute against Bulgaria, leading Nigeria to a 1–0 win. This was the only goal he scored in the final tournament of a World Cup. He did not play in the subsequent match against Paraguay. He started the round-of-16 match against Denmark, but Nigeria lost 4–1 and were eliminated from the competition.

Ikpeba helped Nigeria finish as runners-up at the 2000 Africa Cup of Nations. In the group-stage match against Tunisia, he scored twice in the 68th and 74th minutes to help Nigeria win 4–2. He scored two goals in the tournament and also featured in the group-stage match against the Republic of the Congo and the semi-final against South Africa. He played in the final against Cameroon, which ended 2–2 before Cameroon won 4–3 on penalties.

Ikpeba subsequently participated in the 2002 FIFA World Cup qualifiers and the qualifying campaign for the 2002 Africa Cup of Nations. In February 2002, he took part in the 2002 Africa Cup of Nations. On 9 February, he started the third-place play-off against Mali, helping Nigeria secure a 1–0 victory. This was his final appearance for the national team.

Ikpeba represented Nigeria from 1992 to 2002, making 31 appearances and scoring seven goals in senior international matches recognised by FIFA.

== Style of play ==
In spite of his small physique, Ikpeba was a fast, versatile, and opportunistic forward, who was capable of playing as a striker, as a second striker, or on either wing, and was known for his ability to score from any position on the pitch.

== Personal life ==
Ikpeba now lives in Lagos, and he co-hosts Monday Night Football on Supersport. His wife Atinuke died in May 2000 at the age of 26, after losing her battle with breast cancer.

== Honours ==
RFC Liège

- Belgian Cup: 1989–90

Monaco

- Ligue 1: 1996–97
- Trophée des Champions: 1997

Al-Ittihad

- Libyan Premier League: 2002–03

Nigeria

- Africa Cup of Nations: 1994
- Olympic Games: 1996

Individual

- Ebony Shoe Award: 1993
- African Footballer of the Year: 1997
