= Joseph Dosu =

Nigerian footballer

Personal information
- Date of birth: 19 June 1973 (age 53)
- Place of birth: Abuja, Nigeria
- Height: 6 ft 4 in (1.93 m)
- Position: Goalkeeper

Team information
- Current team: Westerlo Football Academy (Head coach)

Youth career
- until 1990: Julius Berger

Senior career*
Years	Team	Apps	(Gls)
1991–1996	Julius Berger		
1996–1998	Reggiana	0	(0)

International career
1996–1997	Nigeria	3	(0)

Managerial career
- 2009–: Westerlo Football Academy
- * Club domestic league appearances and goals

Olympic medal record

Representing Nigeria

Men's Football
Gold medal – first place	1996 Atlanta	Team competition

Joseph Dosu (born 19 June 1973) is a Nigerian former footballer who played as a goalkeeper.

== Club career ==
Dosu helped Julius Berger win the Nigerian FA Cup in November 1996, by keeping a clean sheet in the finals against Katsina United. His career came to an abrupt end after a serious car accident in Lagos in 1997, almost left him paralyzed.

After the 1996 Olympics, Dosu signed with Serie A club Reggiana. He failed to make an impact in Italy and was forced to retire at the age of 23, due to a career ending automobile accident.

== International career ==
He was the only home based player to be included in Nigeria's 1996 Olympic team, where despite being the least experienced of the three goalkeepers ended up as the team's first choice goalkeeper. After winning Gold with the Super Eagles in the 1996 Olympics, he went on to play three more international games for Nigeria. The November 1996 FIFA World Cup qualifiers against Burkina Faso, which the Super Eagles won 2–0 in Lagos. The friendly against Morocco in December 1996, where he kept another clean sheet, and the FIFA World Cup qualifier against Kenya in January 1997. The match against Kenya which ended in a 1–1 draw, was his last game for the Nigeria.

== Coaching career ==
He started his coaching career 2009 as Head coach by Lagos-based Westerlo Football Academy.
