= Mobi Oparaku =

Nigerian footballer

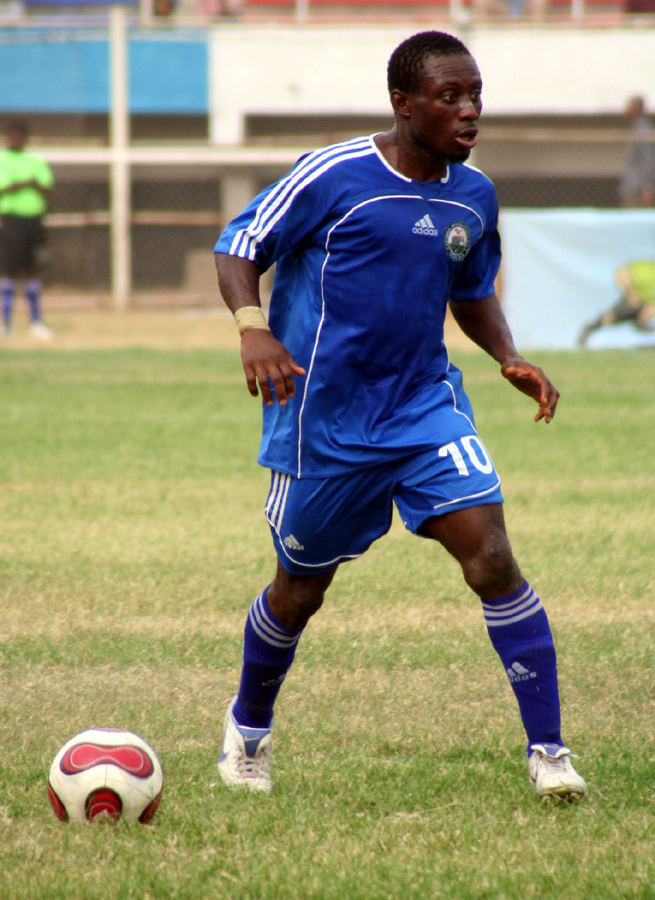
- Oparaku in 2010

Personal information
- Full name: Mobi Patrick Oparaku
- Date of birth: 1 December 1976 (age 49)
- Place of birth: Owerri, Nigeria
- Height: 1.78 m (5 ft 10 in)
- Position: Defender

Senior career*
Years	Team	Apps	(Gls)
1993–1995	Iwuanyanwo Nationale		
1995	Anderlecht		
1995–1997	Turnhout	30	(2)
1997–1999	Capellen	25	(5)
2000	El Paso Patriots	13	(3)
2001	Connecticut Wolves	23	(1)
2001–2005	Rivoli United		
2005–2008	Gateway F.C.		
2008–2010	Enyimba International		

International career
1993	Nigeria U-17	6	(0)
1996	Nigeria U-23	6	(0)
1996–2003	Nigeria	8	(0)
Medal record
Olympic medal record
Representing Nigeria
Men's Football
Gold medal – first place	1996 Atlanta	Team competition
- * Club domestic league appearances and goals

Mobi Patrick Oparaku (born 1 December 1976) is a Nigerian former professional footballer who played as a defender. He began his career with Iwuanyanwu Nationale before playing for clubs including Anderlecht and Turnhout. He subsequently continued his career with several clubs in the United States and Jamaica.

Oparaku represented the Nigeria national football team, winning a gold medal at the 1996 Summer Olympics football tournament and participating in the 1998 FIFA World Cup.

== Club career ==
Oparaku was born in Owerri, Imo State, and began his football career with Iwuanyanwu Nationale in 1993. In 1995, he moved to Belgium to join Anderlecht, but soon moved to Turnhout. At Turnhout, he made 30 appearances and scored two goals from the 1995–96 season through the 1996–97 season. He then moved to Cappellen in 1997, making 25 appearances and scoring five goals before leaving in 1999.

In 2000, he moved to the United States and played for the El Paso Patriots. He made 13 appearances and scored three goals in the USL A-League, before joining the Connecticut Wolves in 2001, where he made 23 appearances and scored one goal. He subsequently played for Jamaican club Rivoli United, before returning to Nigeria in 2005 to join Gateway.

He played for Gateway from 2005 to 2008 before moving to Enyimba. With Enyimba, he finished third in the Nigeria Premier League in the 2008–09 season and won the Nigeria Federation Cup in 2009. In the 2009–10 season, he won the Nigeria Premier League. He retired from professional football in 2010.

== International career ==
Oparaku participated in the 1993 FIFA U-17 World Championship as a member of the Nigeria U-17 national team. He started all six of Nigeria's matches in the tournament, with Nigeria winning all six matches to claim the title.

In 1996, he participated in the 1996 Summer Olympics football tournament as a member of the Nigeria U-23 national team. Oparaku appeared in all six of Nigeria's matches, playing in the group-stage matches against Hungary, Japan, and Brazil. He subsequently appeared in the quarter-final against Mexico, the semi-final against Brazil, and the final against Argentina. In particular, in the semi-final against Brazil, he started the match and was substituted by Wilson Oruma in the 82nd minute, with Nigeria winning 4–3 after extra time. He also started the final, in which Nigeria defeated Argentina 3–2 to win the gold medal. Oparaku made six appearances in the tournament and contributed to Nigeria winning its first Olympic football gold medal.

Oparaku was subsequently called up to the Nigeria national team and participated in the 1998 FIFA World Cup. He started Nigeria's opening group-stage match against Spain and played 69 minutes, with Nigeria winning 3–2. He did not play in the subsequent group-stage matches against Bulgaria and Paraguay, or in the round of 16 against Denmark. Against Spain, Oparaku was substituted by Rashidi Yekini in the 70th minute, and Nigeria won 3–2.
