= FIFA Female Player of the Century =

2000 football award

FIFA Female Player of the Century was a one-off award created by the global governing body FIFA to decide the greatest football female player of the 20th century, announced at the annual FIFA World gala, held in Rome on 11 December 2000. American player Michelle Akers and Chinese player Sun Wen were joint winners of the award. Michelle Akers won the award based on votes from FIFA officials, journalists and coaches, while Sun Wen won the award based on the Internet poll.

== Background ==
Since 1991, FIFA has been awarding honors for FIFA World Player of the Year. The organization decided to conduct a public vote to decide the FIFA Player of the Century (for male players), FIFA Goalkeeper of the Century, and FIFA Female Player of the Century.

== Voting ==
Akers was named FIFA Player of the Century in joint voting by readers of FIFA Magazine (weighted at 50%) and the members of the FIFA Football Committee (also weighted at 50%). China's Sun Wen shared the title of FIFA Player of the Century based on the votes cast by the fans through the FIFA website.

In addition to Akers' award, American forward Mia Hamm, finished in the top three in voting for both awards. Hamm finished behind Sun Wen (footballer) in the Internet Award balloting, and third behind both Akers and Sun in the Player of the Century voting.

== See also ==
- List of sports awards honoring women
- IFFHS World Female Player of the Century
