= Sun Wen (footballer) =

Chinese footballer (born 1973)

Personal information
- Full name: Sun Wen
- Date of birth: 6 April 1973 (age 53)
- Place of birth: Shanghai, China
- Height: 1.62 m (5 ft 4 in)
- Position: Forward

Senior career*
Years	Team	Apps	(Gls)
1989–2000	Shanghai	659	(164)
2001–2002	Atlanta Beat	33	(7)
2003	Shanghai SVA		
2006	Shanghai SVA		

International career
1990–2006	China	163	(106)
Medal record
Women's football
Representing China
Olympic Games
Silver medal – second place	1996 Atlanta	Team
Asian Games
Gold medal – first place	1994 Hiroshima	Team
Gold medal – first place	1998 Bangkok	Team
Silver medal – second place	2002 Busan	Team
- * Club domestic league appearances and goals

Sun Wen (Chinese: 孙雯; pinyin: Sūn Wén; born 6 April 1973) is a Chinese former professional footballer who played as a forward. She previously captained the China national team and the Atlanta Beat of the Women's United Soccer Association (WUSA).

In 2000, she won the FIFA Female Player of the Century along with Michelle Akers. Sun won both the Golden Ball (top player) and Golden Boot (top scorer) for her performance at the 1999 FIFA Women's World Cup. She is considered one of the all-time greats of the women's game.

After the retirement, she became vice-president of the Chinese Football Association in 2019.

== Early life ==
Sun began playing football around the age of ten. Her father, Sun Zonggao, was a recreational football player who took Sun with him to watch matches in the Chinese men's league. Sun credits him for influencing her foray into the sport.

Sun studied Chinese literature at the University of Shanghai.

== Playing career ==
=== Club ===
==== Shanghai SVA ====
Sun played for the Shanghai team in the Chinese women's league.

==== Atlanta Beat ====
Sun played for the Atlanta Beat of the Women's United Soccer Association from 2001 to 2002. She was the first overall pick of the WUSA's Inaugural Draft (together in the team, also was drafted her Asian compatriot Homare Sawa), but a knee and ankle injury limited her first season with the Beat to 13 games with five starts. During the league's semifinal match against the Philadelphia Charge, the Beat were down 2–0; however, Sun scored on a penalty kick and then provided the assist on the equalizer goal with a corner kick headed in by Cindy Parlow. The Beat would go on to win the match 3–2. She then notched the Beat's third goal in the Founders Cup, helping the team to an eventual 3–3 tie during regulation. The San Jose CyberRays won the title in a penalty kick shootout.

During the 2002 season, Sun played in 18 games, making 10 starts. She scored four goals as the Beat earned another chance at the playoffs, but the Beat were eliminated in the semifinals.

Sun announced her retirement from the WUSA in January 2003 to return to China in preparation for the 2003 FIFA Women's World Cup.

=== International ===
Sun appeared on China's national squad at the age of 17 and went on to appear in four FIFA Women's World Cup tournaments for China and became one of three women to have played all of China's 15 matches in its three World Cup appearances. In 1999, she had 10 goals in her World Cup career, leaving her tied for second place on an all-time scoring list.

Sun helped the national team win the Asian Cup in 1991, 1993, 1995 and 1997.

Sun led China to a silver medal at the 1996 Summer Olympics in Athens, Georgia. During the 1999 FIFA Women's World Cup, Sun scored seven goals and earned the Golden Ball (top player) and Golden Boot (top scorer) at the tournament.

She returned to the Chinese women's team from a two-year retirement on 15 December 2005. Due to injury reasons, Sun retired again after winning AFC Women's Asian Cup in 2006.

==== Matches and goals scored at World Cup and Olympic tournaments ====
Sun played 28 matches and scored 16 goals in 4 world cup tournaments and 2 Olympics: China 1991, Sweden 1995, Atlanta 1996, USA 1999, Sydney 2000, USA 2003; she played and started every match for China. Sun Wen, with her China teams, won a silver medal at Atlanta 1996 Olympics, and finished second at USA 1999 world cup.

Key (expand for notes on "world cup and olympic goals")
Location	Geographic location of the venue where the competition occurred
Lineup	Start – played entire match on minute (off player) – substituted on at the minute indicated, and player was substituted off at the same time off minute (on player) – substituted off at the minute indicated, and player was substituted on at the same time (c) – captain
Min	The minute in the match the goal was scored. For list that include caps, blank indicates played in the match but did not score a goal.
Assist/pass	The ball was passed by the player, which assisted in scoring the goal. This column depends on the availability and source of this information.
penalty or pk	Goal scored on penalty-kick which was awarded due to foul by opponent. (Goals scored in penalty-shoot-out, at the end of a tied match after extra-time, are not included.)
Score	The match score after the goal was scored.
Result	The final score. W – match was won L – match was lost to opponent D – match was drawn (W) – penalty-shoot-out was won after a drawn match (L) – penalty-shoot-out was lost after a drawn match
aet	The score at the end of extra-time; the match was tied at the end of 90' regulation
pso	Penalty-shoot-out score shown in parentheses; the match was tied at the end of extra-time
	Pink background color – Olympic women's football tournament
	Blue background color – FIFA women's world cup final tournament

Goal	Match	Date	Location	Opponent	Lineup	Min	Score	Result	Competition
China 1991 FIFA Women's World Cup
	1	1991-11-16	Guangzhou	Norway	off 70' (on Zhu Tao)			4–0 W	Group stage
1	2	1991-11-19	Guangzhou	Denmark	Start	37	1–1	2–2 D	Group stage
	3	1991-11-21	Foshan	New Zealand	Start			4–1 W	Group stage
	4	1991-11-24	Guangzhou	Sweden	Start			0–1 L	Quarter-final
Sweden 1995 FIFA Women's World Cup
2	5	1995-06-06	Gävle	United States	Start	79	3–3	3–3 D	Group stage
	6	1995-06-08	Västerås	Australia	Start			4–2 W	Group stage
3	7	1995-06-10	Västerås	Denmark	Start	76	2–1	3–1 W	Group stage
	8	1995-06-13	Helsingborg	Sweden	Start			1–1 (pso 4–3) (W)	Quarter-final
	9	1995-06-15	Helsingborg	Germany	Start			0–1 L	Semi-final
	10	1995-06-17	Gävle	United States	off 59' (on Wei Haiying)			0–2 L	Third place match
(United States) Atlanta 1996 Olympic Women's Football Tournament
	11	1996-07-21	Miami	Sweden	Start			2–0 W	Group stage
	12	1996-07-23	Miami	Denmark	off 43' (on Chen Yufeng)			5–1 W	Group stage
	13	1996-07-25	Miami	United States	Start			0–0 D	Group stage
	14	1996-07-28	Athens GA	Brazil	Start			3–2 W	Semi-final
4	15	1996-08-01	Athens GA	United States	Start	32	1–1	1–2 L	Gold medal match
(United States) USA 1999 FIFA Women's World Cup
	16	1999-06-19	San Jose CA	Sweden	off 74' (on Pu Wei)			2–1 W	Group stage
5	17	1999-06-23	Portland OR	Ghana	Start	9	1–0	7–0 W	Group stage
6	17	1999-06-23	Portland OR	Ghana	Start	21	3–0	7–0 W	Group stage
7	17	1999-06-23	Portland OR	Ghana	Start	54	4–0	7–0 W	Group stage
8	18	1999-06-26	E Rutherford NJ	Australia	off 63' (on Qiu Haiyan)	39	1–0	3–1 W	Group stage
9	18	1999-06-26	E Rutherford NJ	Australia	off 63' (on Qiu Haiyan)	51	2–0	3–1 W	Group stage
	19	1999-06-30	San Jose CA	Russia	Start			2–0 W	Quarter-final
10	20	1999-07-04	Boston	Norway	Start	3	1–0	5–0 W	Semi-final
11	20	1999-07-04	Boston	Norway	Start	72 pk	5–0	5–0 W	Semi-final
	21	1999-07-10	Los Angeles	United States	Start			0–0 (pso 4–5) (L)	Final
(Australia) Sydney 2000 Olympic Women's Football Tournament
12	22	2000-09-14	Canberra	Nigeria	Start	57	2–0	3–1 W	Group stage
13	22	2000-09-14	Canberra	Nigeria	Start	83	3–0	3–1 W	Group stage
14	23	2000-09-17	Melbourne	United States	Start	67	1–1	1–1 D	Group stage
15	24	2000-09-20	Canberra	Norway	Start	75	1–1	1–2 L	Group stage
(United States) USA 2003 FIFA Women's World Cup
16	25	2003-09-21	Carson CA	Ghana	Start; (c)	29	1–0	1–0 W	Group stage
	26	2003-09-25	Carson CA	Australia	Start; (c)			1–1 D	Group stage
	27	2003-09-28	Portland OR	Russia	Start; (c)			1–0 W	Group stage
	28	2003-10-02	Portland OR	Canada	Start; (c)			0–1 L	Quarter-final

=== Honors and awards ===
Sun won both the Golden Boot (which she shared with Sissi, of Brazil) and the Golden Ball for the 1999 Women's World Cup, and became the first woman to be nominated for the Asian Football Confederation player of the year award.

In 2002, she received the FIFA Internet Award in the FIFA Female Player of the Century voting. While the overall award was won by American Michelle Akers, Sun received the most internet votes on the FIFA-website.

== International goals ==
No.	Date	Venue	Opponent	Score	Result	Competition
1.	19 November 1991	Guangzhou, China	Denmark	1–1	2–2	1991 FIFA Women's World Cup
2.	7 October 1994	Fukuyama, Japan	South Korea	1–0	2–0	1994 Asian Games
3.	7 October 1994	Fukuyama, Japan	South Korea	2–0	2–0	1994 Asian Games
4.	12 October 1994	Fukuyama, Japan	Japan	2–0	2–0	1994 Asian Games
5.	6 June 1995	Gävle, Sweden	United States	3–3	3–3	1995 FIFA Women's World Cup
6.	10 June 1995	Västerås, Sweden	Denmark	2–1	2–1	1995 FIFA Women's World Cup
7.	24 September 1995	Kota Kinabalu, Malaysia	Philippines	1–0	21–0	1995 AFC Women's Championship
8.	24 September 1995	Kota Kinabalu, Malaysia	Philippines	?–0	21–0	1995 AFC Women's Championship
9.	24 September 1995	Kota Kinabalu, Malaysia	Philippines	?–0	21–0	1995 AFC Women's Championship
10.	30 September 1995	Kota Kinabalu, Malaysia	South Korea	1–0	4–0	1995 AFC Women's Championship
11.	2 October 1995	Kota Kinabalu, Malaysia	Japan	1–0	2–0	1995 AFC Women's Championship
12.	1 August 1996	Athens, United States	United States	1–1	1–2	1996 Summer Olympics
13.	12 December 1997	Guangzhou, China	Chinese Taipei	1–0	10–0	1997 AFC Women's Championship
14.	12 December 1997	Guangzhou, China	Chinese Taipei	2–0	10–0	1997 AFC Women's Championship
15.	24 January 1998	Guangzhou, China	Sweden	1–0	4–0	1998 Four Nations Tournament
16.	24 January 1998	Guangzhou, China	Sweden	3–0	4–0	1998 Four Nations Tournament
17.	21 July 1998	Montreal, Canada	Canada	1–0	4–0	Friendly
18.	21 July 1998	Montreal, Canada	Canada	3–0	4–0	Friendly
19.	21 July 1998	Montreal, Canada	Canada	4–0	4–0	Friendly
20.	14 March 1999	Faro, Portugal	Portugal	1–0	4–0	1999 Algarve Cup
21.	14 March 1999	Faro, Portugal	Portugal	2–0	4–0	1999 Algarve Cup
22.	18 March 1999	Albufeira, Portugal	Australia	1–0	2–0	1999 Algarve Cup
23.	25 March 1999	Holzwickede, Germany	Germany	2–0	3–0	Friendly
24.	22 April 1999	Hershey, United States	United States	1–1	1–2	Friendly
25.	23 June 1999	Portland, United States	Ghana	1–0	7–0	1999 FIFA Women's World Cup
26.	23 June 1999	Portland, United States	Ghana	3–0	7–0	1999 FIFA Women's World Cup
27.	23 June 1999	Portland, United States	Ghana	4–0	7–0	1999 FIFA Women's World Cup
28.	26 June 1999	East Rutherford, United States	Australia	1–0	3–1	1999 FIFA Women's World Cup
29.	26 June 1999	East Rutherford, United States	Australia	2–0	3–1	1999 FIFA Women's World Cup
30.	4 July 1999	Foxborough, United States	Norway	1–0	5–0	1999 FIFA Women's World Cup
31.	4 July 1999	Foxborough, United States	Norway	5–0	5–0	1999 FIFA Women's World Cup
32.	7 November 1999	Bacolod, Philippines	South Korea	3–?	5–2	1999 AFC Women's Championship
33.	9 November 1999	Bacolod, Philippines	Guam	2–0	15–0	1999 AFC Women's Championship
34.	9 November 1999	Bacolod, Philippines	Guam	7–0	15–0	1999 AFC Women's Championship
35.	19 November 1999	Bacolod, Philippines	North Korea	3–0	3–0	1999 AFC Women's Championship
36.	12 March 2000	Lagoa, Portugal	Canada	1–0	4–0	2000 Algarve Cup
37.	12 March 2000	Lagoa, Portugal	Canada	4–0	4–0	2000 Algarve Cup
38.	18 March 2000	Quarteira, Portugal	Sweden	1–0	1–0	2000 Algarve Cup
39.	31 May 2000	Canberra, Australia	United States	1–0	1–0	Friendly
40.	2 June 2000	Sydney, Australia	Australia	1–0	1–1	Friendly
41.	8 June 2000	Newcastle, Australia	Canada	1–2	2–2	Friendly
42.	14 August 2000	Yangzhou, China	Australia	2–0	3–0	Friendly
43.	14 September 2000	Canberra, Australia	Nigeria	2–0	3–1	2000 Summer Olympics
44.	14 September 2000	Canberra, Australia	Nigeria	3–0	3–1	2000 Summer Olympics
45.	17 September 2000	Melbourne, Australia	United States	1–1	1–1	2000 Summer Olympics
46.	20 September 2000	Canberra, Australia	Norway	1–1	1–2	2000 Summer Olympics
47.	9 December 2001	New Taipei City, Taiwan	Philippines	2–0	10–0	2001 AFC Women's Championship
48.	14 December 2001	New Taipei City, Taiwan	North Korea	1–2	1–3	2001 AFC Women's Championship
49.	26 January 2003	Wuhan, China	United States	2–0	2–0	2003 Four Nations Tournament
50.	22 February 2003	Marmande, France	France	2–0	2–1	Friendly
51.	16 March 2003	Ferreiras, Portugal	France	1–0	3–0	2003 Algarve Cup
52.	16 March 2003	Ferreiras, Portugal	France	3–0	3–0	2003 Algarve Cup
53.	18 March 2003	Albufeira, Portugal	Denmark	2–1	2–1	2003 Algarve Cup
54.	9 June 2003	Nakhon Sawan, Thailand	Vietnam	2–0	6–0	2003 AFC Women's Championship
55.	11 June 2003	Nakhon Sawan, Thailand	India	3–0	12–0	2003 AFC Women's Championship
56.	11 June 2003	Nakhon Sawan, Thailand	India	7–0	12–0	2003 AFC Women's Championship
57.	11 June 2003	Nakhon Sawan, Thailand	India	8–0	12–0	2003 AFC Women's Championship
58.	11 June 2003	Nakhon Sawan, Thailand	India	11–0	12–0	2003 AFC Women's Championship
59.	11 June 2003	Nakhon Sawan, Thailand	India	12–0	12–0	2003 AFC Women's Championship
60.	19 June 2003	Bangkok, Thailand	South Korea	3–1	3–1	2003 AFC Women's Championship
61.	7 September 2003	Dalian, China	South Africa	2–0	13–0	Friendly
62.	7 September 2003	Dalian, China	South Africa	5–0	13–0	Friendly
63.	7 September 2003	Dalian, China	South Africa	7–0	13–0	Friendly
64.	21 September 2003	Carson, United States	Ghana	1–0	1–0	2003 FIFA Women's World Cup

== Personal life and Football administration career ==
After her retirement, Sun Wen worked in the Chinese media, advertising and education.

In August 2019, she was elected as the vice-president of the Chinese Football Association with a mission of the development of the women's football in China. She also worked as member of FIFA Technical Study Group in the 2019 FIFA Women's World Cup hosted in France and member of the Bid Evaluation Task Force for the 2027 FIFA Women's World Cup.

== See also ==
- List of association women football players with 100 or more international goals
- List of women's footballers with 100 or more international caps
