= Lencie Fred =

Vanuatuan football referee

- Full name: Lencie Fred
- Born: 21 March 1968 (age 58); Port Vila, Vanuatu

International
Years	League	Role
1996–2000	FIFA listed	Assistant referee
2000–2009	FIFA listed	Referee

Lencie Fred (born 21 March 1968) is the current Referee Development Officer of the Vanuatu Football Federation. Fred is a former international association football referee from Vanuatu. He was the first referee from his country to be included on the FIFA list of referees. Fred started refereeing at a young age and was named as an assistant referee for the 1996 Summer Olympics. He assisted Pierluigi Collina in the final of that competition between Nigeria and Argentina, allowing a controversial late winning goal for Nigeria. Two years later, he was selected to be an assistant at the 1998 FIFA World Cup and officiated five games during the tournament, including the third place match between Netherlands and Croatia.

Fred was appointed to the list of FIFA referees in 2000, but was largely inactive during the first part of the decade. He refereed the second leg of the Oceania Preliminary Competition for the 2001 FIFA U-17 World Championship, which saw Australia beat New Zealand 6–0. He eventually became one of the most senior referees in the Oceania Football Confederation, regularly officiating international matches on that continent. He was selected as a referee for the 2006 FIFA World Cup qualification campaign, the 2007 South Pacific Games, 2008 OFC Men's Olympic Football Tournament and the 2008 OFC Nations Cup. He took charge of his final competitive international match on 19 November 2008 when Fiji achieved a 2–0 victory over New Zealand in a qualifying match for the 2010 FIFA World Cup. Fred retired from international refereeing at the end of 2009, at the age of 41.

Aside from international football, Fred also refereed domestic and continental matches. He regularly officiated matches in the group stages of the OFC Champions League, and was named as fourth official for both the 2007 and 2008 O-League finals. His last O-League match in charge was the group stage match between Ba of Fiji and Koloale FC Honiara of the Solomon Islands on 2 November 2008. In the match, he showed a red card to one player from each team.
