= Michelle Akers =

American soccer player (born 1966)

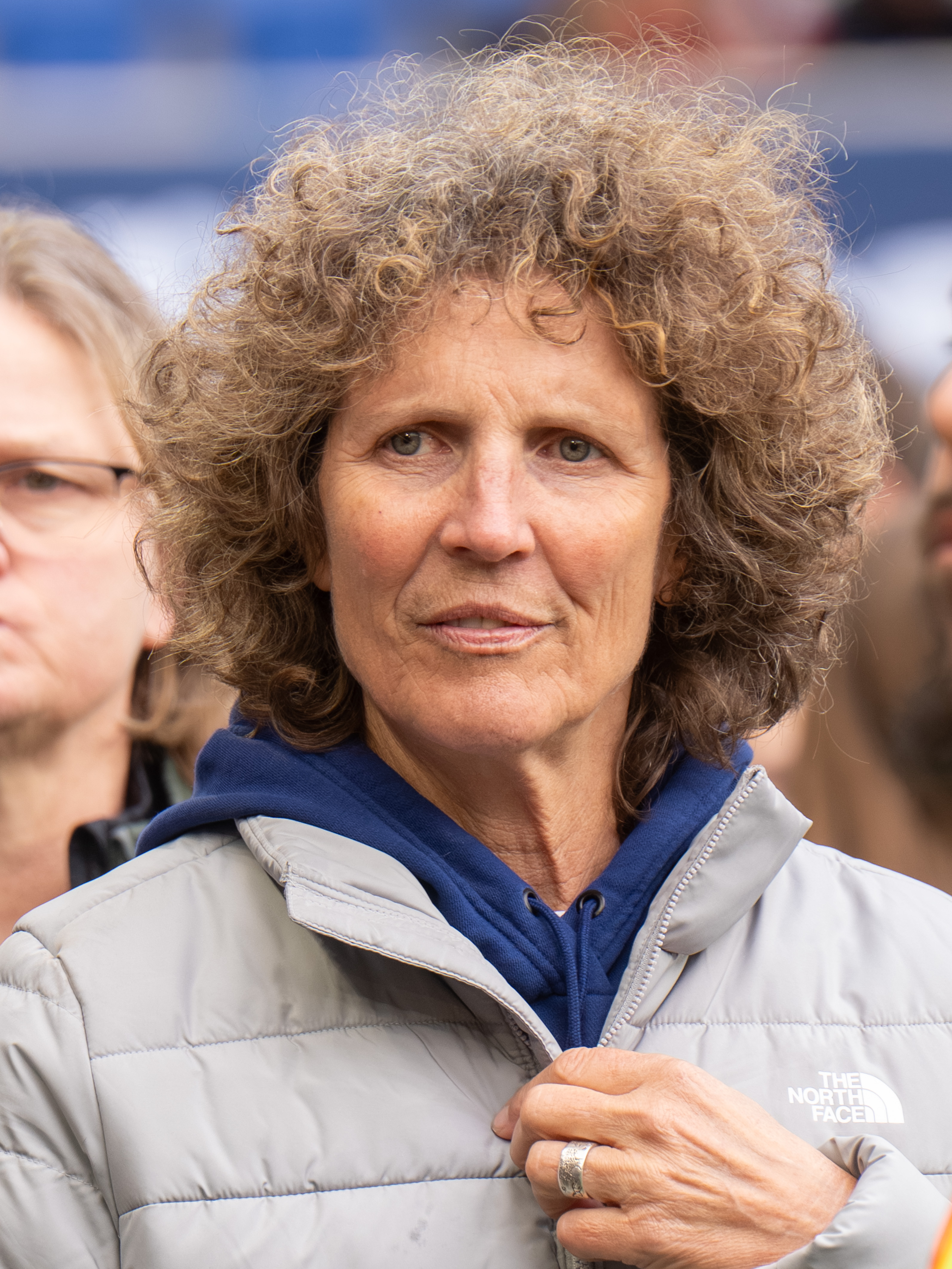
- Akers in 2026

Personal information
- Full name: Michelle Anne Akers
- Date of birth: February 1, 1966 (age 60)
- Place of birth: Santa Clara, California, U.S.
- Height: 5 ft 10 in (1.78 m)
- Positions: Midfielder; forward

College career
| Years | Team | Apps | (Gls) |
| 1985–1989 | UCF Knights | | |

Senior career*
| Years | Team | Apps | (Gls) |
| 1990 | Tyresö FF | 18 | (8) |
| 1992 | Tyresö FF | | |
| 1992 | Orlando Lions Women | 29 | (8) |
| 1994 | Tyresö FF | 19 | (3) |

International career
| 1985–2000 | United States | 155 | (107) |

Managerial career
- 2022: Orlando Pride (assistant)
Medal record
Women's soccer
Representing United States
Olympic Games
| Gold medal – first place | 1996 Atlanta | Team competition |
FIFA Women's World Cup
| Gold medal – first place | 1991 China | Team competition |
| Gold medal – first place | 1999 USA | Team competition |
| Bronze medal – third place | 1995 Sweden | Team competition |
- * Club domestic league appearances and goals

Michelle Anne Akers (formerly Akers-Stahl; born February 1, 1966) is an American former soccer player who starred in the 1991 and 1999 Women's World Cup and 1996 Olympics victories by the United States. At the 1991 World Cup, she won the Golden Shoe as the top scorer, with ten goals.

Akers is regarded as one of the greatest female soccer players in history. She was named FIFA Female Player of the Century in 2002, an award she shared with China's Sun Wen. In 2004, Akers and Mia Hamm were the only two women named to the FIFA 100, a list of the 125 greatest living soccer players selected by Pelé and commissioned by FIFA for that organization's 100th anniversary.

Akers is a member of the National Soccer Hall of Fame, inducted in 2004.

== Early life ==
Born to Robert and Anne Akers in Santa Clara, California on February 1, 1966, Akers grew up in the Seattle, Washington suburb of Shoreline, where she attended and played soccer for Shorecrest High School. Early in her career, she was not sure whether she was willing to do the training necessary to excel. After losing a youth game, she was frustrated and walked off the field in tears. Her father asked her "Did you have fun". Her answer was "yes" which led to the realization that this was the real reason she played, and that helped turn her into the fierce competitor she became. She was named an All-American three times during her high school career. At 5 feet 10 inches (178 cm) in height and 150 pounds (68 kg), Akers had an imposing physical presence on the soccer field and was noted for her aggressive and physical style of play.

=== University of Central Florida ===
Akers attended the University of Central Florida on a scholarship where she was selected as four-time NCAA All-American. She was Central Florida's Athlete of the Year in 1988–89, was the all-time leading scorer in UCF history, won the Hermann Trophy in 1988 as the nation's top college soccer player, and had her #10 jersey retired by the school.

== International career ==
Akers was a member of the 1985 United States women's national soccer team (USWNT) for its first-ever game, at a tournament in Italy in August 1985. Due to an ankle injury, she did not play in the first game. However, in the U.S.'s second-ever international game, she scored the first goal in the history of the program, in a 2–2 tie against Denmark.

Akers scored 15 goals in 24 games for the U.S. from 1985 to 1990, before scoring a team-record 39 goals in 26 games in the 1991 season. In 1990 and 1991 she was named the Female Athlete of the Year by the United States Soccer Federation (USSF). Akers was also the lead scorer in the inaugural FIFA Women's World Cup in China in 1991, scoring ten goals, including five in one game. This led the U.S. women's team to the first women's world championship, defeating Norway 2–1 in the final. Akers scored both U.S. goals in the final.

Throughout most of her career, Akers was afflicted by chronic fatigue syndrome, repeatedly considering retirement only to continue playing in some of U.S. Soccer's most significant matches.

After the 1991 World Cup, she shifted from striker to central midfielder, in part to minimize the beatings doled out by opposing defenders. Despite the precautions, Akers suffered a concussion and a knee injury early in the 1995 World Cup, and was hampered by the knee in the U.S.'s semifinal loss to Norway.

In 1996, Akers was again a member of the U.S. women's national team at the 1996 Summer Olympics in Atlanta, Georgia, where it won the first gold medal in Olympic Women's Soccer. She played with a torn medial collateral ligament in the holding central midfielder role, anchoring the team's defense, dominating in the air, and playmaking out of the back to maintain possession and generate goal-scoring opportunities. After the tournament her knee required reconstructive surgery for the third time. She was also a member of the gold medal-winning 1998 Goodwill Games team. On June 7, 1998, she was awarded the FIFA Order of Merit, FIFA's highest honor in the global game of soccer, for her contributions to the game of soccer on and off the field; she was the first woman ever to receive it. Akers again was a leader and member of the 1999 Women's World Cup team, where the team won their second World Cup championship. Despite playing with a dislocated shoulder, caused by a fan in the quarterfinals, she was awarded the Bronze Ball of the tournament by FIFA.

Shortly before the 2000 Summer Olympics in Sydney, Australia, Akers retired from the game due to injuries incurred before and during the 1999 FIFA World Cup. She was the U.S. national team's second all-time leading scorer (behind Mia Hamm) with 105 goals, 37 assists and 247 points.

== Coaching career ==
On January 19, 2022, the Orlando Pride announced Akers as an assistant coach for the 2022 season, serving under head coach Amanda Cromwell. She also served in a player development and mentorship role, and assisted with community outreach.

== Personal life ==
From 1990 to 1994, she was married and was known as Michelle Akers-Stahl. Later she married again (2003–2007) and had a son in Orlando, Florida. She has had several horses since 1996 and runs a horse rescue ranch on 8 acres (3.2 ha) in Powder Springs, Georgia, with her son Cody.

Since her retirement from the USWNT in 2000, she has also continued to promote the game of soccer as a spokesperson, advocate, and leader on various platforms.

== Career statistics ==
Appearances and goals by national team and year
| National team | Year | Apps | Goals |
|---|---|---|---|
| United States | 1985 | 2 | 2 |
| United States | 1986 | 5 | 0 |
| United States | 1987 | 9 | 3 |
| United States | 1988 | 2 | 0 |
| United States | 1990 | 6 | 9 |
| United States | 1991 | 26 | 39 |
| United States | 1993 | 12 | 6 |
| United States | 1994 | 12 | 11 |
| United States | 1995 | 20 | 17 |
| United States | 1996 | 17 | 7 |
| United States | 1997 | 2 | 1 |
| United States | 1998 | 15 | 5 |
| United States | 1999 | 20 | 6 |
| United States | 2000 | 7 | 1 |
| Total | | 155 | 107 |

Scores and results list the United States' goal tally first, score column indicates score after each Akers goal.

List of international goals scored by Michelle Akers
| No. | Date | Venue | Opponent | Score | Result | Competition | Ref. |
|---|---|---|---|---|---|---|---|
| 1 | August 21, 1985 | Jesolo, Italy | Denmark | 1–? | 2–2 | Friendly | |
| 2 | August 23, 1985 | Caorle, Italy | England | 1–? | 1–3 | Friendly | |
| 3 | December 16, 1987 | Taipei, Taiwan | Australia | 2–0 | 6–0 | Friendly | |
| 4 | December 19, 1987 | Taipei, Taiwan | Canada | 1–0 | 4–0 | Friendly | |
| 5 | December 19, 1987 | Taipei, Taiwan | Canada | ?–0 | 4–0 | Friendly | |
| 6 | July 25, 1990 | Winnipeg, Canada | Norway | 2–0 | 4–0 | Friendly | |
| 7 | July 29, 1990 | Winnipeg, Canada | Norway | 2–2 | 4–2 | Friendly | |
| 8 | August 5, 1990 | Blaine, United States | Soviet Union | ?–0 | 8–0 | Friendly | |
| 9 | August 5, 1990 | Blaine, United States | Soviet Union | ?–0 | 8–0 | Friendly | |
| 10 | August 5, 1990 | Blaine, United States | Soviet Union | ?–0 | 8–0 | Friendly | |
| 11 | August 9, 1990 | Blaine, United States | England | 1–0 | 3–0 | Friendly | |
| 12 | August 9, 1990 | Blaine, United States | England | ?–0 | 3–0 | Friendly | |
| 13 | August 11, 1990 | Blaine, United States | Germany | ?–0 | 3–0 | Friendly | |
| 14 | August 11, 1990 | Blaine, United States | Germany | ?–0 | 3–0 | Friendly | |
| 15 | April 1, 1991 | Varna, Bulgaria | Yugoslavia | ?–0 | 8–0 | Friendly | |
| 16 | April 1, 1991 | Varna, Bulgaria | Yugoslavia | ?–0 | 8–0 | Friendly | |
| 17 | April 1, 1991 | Varna, Bulgaria | Yugoslavia | ?–0 | 8–0 | Friendly | |
| 18 | April 2, 1991 | Varna, Bulgaria | Bulgaria | 3–0 | 3–0 | Friendly | |
| 19 | April 5, 1991 | Varna, Bulgaria | France | 2–0 | 2–0 | Friendly | |
| 20 | April 7, 1991 | Varna, Bulgaria | Soviet Union | 3–0 | 5–0 | Friendly | |
| 21 | April 7, 1991 | Varna, Bulgaria | Soviet Union | 4–0 | 5–0 | Friendly | |
| 22 | April 7, 1991 | Varna, Bulgaria | Soviet Union | 5–0 | 5–0 | Friendly | |
| 23 | April 18, 1991 | Port-au-Prince, Haiti | Mexico | 2–0 | 12–0 | 1991 CONCACAF Women's Championship | |
| 24 | April 18, 1991 | Port-au-Prince, Haiti | Mexico | 4–0 | 12–0 | 1991 CONCACAF Women's Championship | |
| 25 | April 20, 1991 | Port-au-Prince, Haiti | Martinique | ?–0 | 12–0 | 1991 CONCACAF Women's Championship | |
| 26 | April 20, 1991 | Port-au-Prince, Haiti | Martinique | ?–0 | 12–0 | 1991 CONCACAF Women's Championship | |
| 27 | April 22, 1991 | Port-au-Prince, Haiti | Trinidad and Tobago | ?–0 | 10–0 | 1991 CONCACAF Women's Championship | |
| 28 | April 22, 1991 | Port-au-Prince, Haiti | Trinidad and Tobago | ?–0 | 10–0 | 1991 CONCACAF Women's Championship | |
| 29 | April 25, 1991 | Port-au-Prince, Haiti | Haiti | ?–0 | 10–0 | 1991 CONCACAF Women's Championship | |
| 30 | April 25, 1991 | Port-au-Prince, Haiti | Haiti | ?–0 | 10–0 | 1991 CONCACAF Women's Championship | |
| 31 | April 28, 1991 | Port-au-Prince, Haiti | Canada | 1–0 | 5–0 | 1991 CONCACAF Women's Championship | |
| 32 | April 28, 1991 | Port-au-Prince, Haiti | Canada | 2–0 | 5–0 | 1991 CONCACAF Women's Championship | |
| 33 | April 28, 1991 | Port-au-Prince, Haiti | Canada | 5–0 | 5–0 | 1991 CONCACAF Women's Championship | |
| 34 | May 18, 1991 | Lyon, France | France | ?–0 | 4–0 | Friendly | |
| 35 | May 25, 1991 | Hirson, France | England | 2–? | 3–1 | Friendly | |
| 36 | May 30, 1991 | Kaiserslautern, Germany | Germany | 2–0 | 4–2 | Friendly | |
| 37 | May 30, 1991 | Kaiserslautern, Germany | Germany | 4–2 | 4–2 | Friendly | |
| 38 | August 4, 1991 | Changchun, China | China | 1–? | 1–2 | Friendly | |
| 39 | August 8, 1991 | Yanji, China | China | 2–? | 2–2 | Friendly | |
| 40 | August 10, 1991 | Anshan, China | China | 1–0 | 3–0 | Friendly | |
| 41 | August 10, 1991 | Anshan, China | China | 2–0 | 3–0 | Friendly | |
| 42 | August 10, 1991 | Anshan, China | China | 3–0 | 3–0 | Friendly | |
| 43 | October 12, 1991 | Fairfax, United States | China | 2–0 | 2–0 | Friendly | |
| 44 | November 19, 1991 | Guangzhou, China | Brazil | 4–0 | 5–0 | 1991 FIFA Women's World Cup | |
| 45 | November 21, 1991 | Foshan, China | Japan | 1–0 | 3–0 | 1991 FIFA Women's World Cup | |
| 46 | November 21, 1991 | Foshan, China | Japan | 2–0 | 3–0 | 1991 FIFA Women's World Cup | |
| 47 | November 24, 1991 | Foshan, China | Chinese Taipei | 1–0 | 7–0 | 1991 FIFA Women's World Cup | |
| 48 | November 24, 1991 | Foshan, China | Chinese Taipei | 2–0 | 7–0 | 1991 FIFA Women's World Cup | |
| 49 | November 24, 1991 | Foshan, China | Chinese Taipei | 3–0 | 7–0 | 1991 FIFA Women's World Cup | |
| 50 | November 24, 1991 | Foshan, China | Chinese Taipei | 5–0 | 7–0 | 1991 FIFA Women's World Cup | |
| 51 | November 24, 1991 | Foshan, China | Chinese Taipei | 6–0 | 7–0 | 1991 FIFA Women's World Cup | |
| 52 | November 30, 1991 | Guangzhou, China | Norway | 1–0 | 2–1 | 1991 FIFA Women's World Cup | |
| 53 | November 30, 1991 | Guangzhou, China | Norway | 2–1 | 2–1 | 1991 FIFA Women's World Cup | |
| 54 | March 11, 1993 | Agia, Cyprus | Denmark | 2–0 | 2–0 | Friendly | |
| 55 | June 12, 1993 | Cincinnati, United States | Canada | 6–0 | 7–0 | Friendly | |
| 56 | June 12, 1993 | Cincinnati, United States | Canada | 7–0 | 7–0 | Friendly | |
| 57 | June 21, 1993 | Pontiac, United States | Canada | 3–0 | 3–0 | Friendly | |
| 58 | August 6, 1993 | New Hyde Park, United States | Trinidad and Tobago | ?–0 | 9–0 | 1993 CONCACAF Women's Invitational Tournament | |
| 59 | August 6, 1993 | New Hyde Park, United States | Trinidad and Tobago | ?–0 | 9–0 | 1993 CONCACAF Women's Invitational Tournament | |
| 60 | April 14, 1994 | San Fernando, Trinidad and Tobago | Canada | 1–0 | 4–1 | Friendly | |
| 61 | April 14, 1994 | San Fernando, Trinidad and Tobago | Canada | 2–0 | 4–1 | Friendly | |
| 62 | April 17, 1994 | Port of Spain, Trinidad and Tobago | Canada | 2–0 | 3–0 | Friendly | |
| 63 | July 31, 1994 | Fairfax, United States | Germany | 2–0 | 2–1 | Friendly | |
| 64 | August 7, 1994 | Worcester, United States | Norway | ?–? | 4–1 | Friendly | |
| 65 | August 13, 1994 | Montreal, Canada | Mexico | ?–0 | 9–0 | 1994 CONCACAF Women's Championship | |
| 66 | August 13, 1994 | Montreal, Canada | Mexico | ?–0 | 9–0 | 1994 CONCACAF Women's Championship | |
| 67 | August 17, 1994 | Montreal, Canada | Trinidad and Tobago | ?–1 | 11–1 | 1994 CONCACAF Women's Championship | |
| 68 | August 19, 1994 | Montreal, Canada | Jamaica | ?–0 | 10–0 | 1994 CONCACAF Women's Championship | |
| 69 | August 19, 1994 | Montreal, Canada | Jamaica | ?–0 | 10–0 | 1994 CONCACAF Women's Championship | |
| 70 | August 21, 1994 | Montreal, Canada | Canada | 6–0 | 6–0 | 1994 CONCACAF Women's Championship | |
| 71 | January 20, 1995 | Phoenix, United States | Australia | ?–0 | 5–0 | Friendly | |
| 72 | January 23, 1995 | Phoenix, United States | Australia | ?–? | 4–1 | Friendly | |
| 73 | February 24, 1995 | Orlando, United States | Denmark | ?–0 | 7–0 | Friendly | |
| 74 | February 24, 1995 | Orlando, United States | Denmark | ?–0 | 7–0 | Friendly | |
| 75 | February 24, 1995 | Orlando, United States | Denmark | ?–0 | 7–0 | Friendly | |
| 76 | March 19, 1995 | Quarteira, Portugal | Norway | 1–0 | 3–3 (2–4 p) | 1995 Algarve Cup | |
| 77 | April 11, 1995 | Poissy, France | Italy | 1–0 | 3–0 | Friendly | |
| 78 | April 12, 1995 | Saint-Maur-des-Fossés, France | Canada | 2–0 | 5–0 | Friendly | |
| 79 | April 28, 1995 | Decatur, United States | Finland | 2–0 | 2–0 | Friendly | |
| 80 | April 30, 1995 | Davidson, United States | Finland | 2–0 | 6–0 | Friendly | |
| 81 | May 14, 1995 | Portland, United States | Brazil | ?–? | 4–1 | Friendly | |
| 82 | May 14, 1995 | Portland, United States | Brazil | ?–? | 4–1 | Friendly | |
| 83 | May 19, 1995 | Dallas, United States | Canada | 3–0 | 9–1 | Friendly | |
| 84 | May 19, 1995 | Dallas, United States | Canada | 4–1 | 9–1 | Friendly | |
| 85 | July 30, 1995 | New Britain, United States | Chinese Taipei | 7–0 | 9–0 | 1995 Women's U.S. Cup | |
| 86 | July 30, 1995 | New Britain, United States | Chinese Taipei | 9–0 | 9–0 | 1995 Women's U.S. Cup | |
| 87 | August 3, 1995 | Piscataway, United States | Australia | ?–? | 4–2 | 1995 Women's U.S. Cup | |
| 88 | January 13, 1996 | Campinas, Brazil | Russia | 2–0 | 8–1 | Friendly | |
| 89 | February 2, 1996 | Tampa, United States | Norway | 2–1 | 3–2 | Friendly | |
| 90 | April 20, 1996 | Fullerton, United States | Netherlands | 6–0 | 6–0 | Friendly | |
| 91 | April 26, 1996 | St. Louis, United States | France | 1–0 | 4–1 | Friendly | |
| 92 | April 28, 1996 | Indianapolis, United States | France | 6–0 | 8–2 | Friendly | |
| 93 | May 18, 1996 | Washington, D.C., United States | China | 1–0 | 1–0 | 1996 Women's U.S. Cup | |
| 94 | July 28, 1996 | Athens, United States | Norway | 1–1 | 2–1 | 1996 Summer Olympics | |
| 95 | November 1, 1997 | Chattanooga, United States | Sweden | 3–0 | 3–1 | Friendly | |
| 96 | March 15, 1998 | Olhão, Portugal | Finland | 1–0 | 2–0 | 1998 Algarve Cup | |
| 97 | April 24, 1998 | Fullerton, United States | Argentina | 3–1 | 8–1 | Friendly | |
| 98 | April 26, 1998 | San Jose, United States | Argentina | 3–0 | 7–0 | Friendly | |
| 99 | July 25, 1998 | Hempstead, United States | Denmark | 2–0 | 5–0 | 1998 Goodwill Games | |
| 100 | September 20, 1998 | Richmond, United States | Brazil | 2–0 | 3–0 | 1998 Women's U.S. Cup | |
| 101 | January 27, 1999 | Orlando, United States | Portugal | 3–0 | 7–0 | Friendly | |
| 102 | January 30, 1999 | Fort Lauderdale, United States | Portugal | 2–0 | 6–0 | Friendly | |
| 103 | April 22, 1999 | Hershey, United States | China | 1–0 | 2–1 | Friendly | |
| 104 | April 29, 1999 | Charlotte, United States | Japan | 1–0 | 9–0 | Friendly | |
| 105 | April 29, 1999 | Charlotte, United States | Japan | 2–0 | 9–0 | Friendly | |
| 106 | June 24, 1999 | Chicago, United States | Nigeria | 5–1 | 7–1 | 1999 FIFA Women's World Cup | |
| 107 | July 4, 1999 | Stanford, United States | Brazil | 2–0 | 2–0 | 1999 FIFA Women's World Cup | |
| 108 | August 13, 2000 | Annapolis, United States | Russia | 4–1 | 7–1 | Friendly | |

== See also ==
- List of women's footballers with 100 or more international goals
- List of Olympic medalists in football
- List of 1996 Summer Olympics medal winners
- List of players with the most goals in an association football game
- 1985 United States women's national soccer team
- List of University of Central Florida alumni
- List of athletes on Wheaties boxes
- List of Golden Scarf recipients
- List of prizes named after people
