= Fan Yunjie =

Chinese footballer (born 1972)

Personal information
- Full name: Fan Yunjie
- Date of birth: 29 April 1972 (age 54)
- Place of birth: Zhengzhou, China
- Height: 1.68 m (5 ft 6 in)
- Position: Defender

Senior career*
Years	Team	Apps	(Gls)
–2001	Henan FC		
2001–2002	San Diego Spirit	37	(1)
2003–200?	Henan FC		

International career
1992–2004	China	192	
Medal record
Women's football
Representing China
Olympic Games
Silver medal – second place	1996 Atlanta	Team
Asian Games
Gold medal – first place	1994 Hiroshima	Team
Gold medal – first place	1998 Bangkok	Team
Silver medal – second place	2002 Busan	Team
FIFA Women's World Cup
Runner-up	1999 United States
- * Club domestic league appearances and goals

Fan Yunjie (simplified Chinese: 范运杰; traditional Chinese: 范運傑; pinyin: Fàn Yùnjié; born 29 April 1972) is a Chinese former footballer who played as a defender. She competed in the 1996, 2000 and 2004 Summer Olympics.

In 1996 she won the silver medal with the Chinese team. She played all five matches and scored one goal.

Four years later she finished fifth with the Chinese team in the women's tournament. She played all three matches.

In 2004, she finished ninth with the Chinese team in the 2004 women's tournament. She played both matches.

She has been employed by Asian Football Confederation in 2008 as Grassroots and Youth Development Officer of Vision China, the AFC's flagship football development project in China, with Chinese Football Association as a partner.

== International goals ==
Scores and results list China's goal tally first.

No.	Date	Venue	Opponent	Score	Result	Competition
1.	17 December 1998	Pathum Thani, Thailand	North Korea	1–0	1–0 (a.e.t.)	1998 Asian Games
2.	4 July 1999	Foxborough, United States	Norway	4–0	5–0	1999 FIFA Women's World Cup
3.	2 October 2002	Busan, South Korea	Chinese Taipei	1–0	1–0	2002 Asian Games
4.	26 January 2003	Wuhan, China	United States	1–0	2–0	2003 Four Nations Tournament

== See also ==
- List of women's footballers with 100 or more international caps
