= Trine Tangeraas =

Norwegian footballer (born 1971)

Medal record

Women's football

Representing Norway

Olympic Games
Bronze medal – third place	1996 Atlanta	Team

Trine Tangeraas (born 26 February 1971 in Kristiansand) is a Norwegian footballer and olympic medalist.

She received a bronze medal at the 1996 Summer Olympics in Atlanta.
