= Shi Guihong =

Chinese footballer

Medal record

Women's football

Representing China

Olympic Games
Silver medal – second place	1996 Atlanta	Team

Asian Games
Gold medal – first place	1994 Hiroshima	Team

Shi Guihong (Chinese: 施桂红, born 13 February 1968) is a Chinese former footballer who competed in the 1996 Summer Olympics.

In 1996 she won the silver medal with the Chinese team. She played all five matches and scored two goals.

== International goals ==
No.	Date	Venue	Opponent	Score	Result	Competition
1.	8 June 1995	Västerås, Sweden	Australia	2–1	4–2	1995 FIFA Women's World Cup
2.	8 June 1995	Västerås, Sweden	Australia	3–1	4–2	1995 FIFA Women's World Cup
3.	10 June 1995	Västerås, Sweden	Denmark	1–0	3–1	1995 FIFA Women's World Cup
4.	24 September 1995	Kota Kinabalu, Malaysia	Philippines	?–0	21–0	1995 AFC Women's Championship
5.	24 September 1995	Kota Kinabalu, Malaysia	Philippines	?–0	21–0	1995 AFC Women's Championship
6.	24 September 1995	Kota Kinabalu, Malaysia	Philippines	?–0	21–0	1995 AFC Women's Championship
7.	24 September 1995	Kota Kinabalu, Malaysia	Philippines	?–0	21–0	1995 AFC Women's Championship
8.	24 September 1995	Kota Kinabalu, Malaysia	Philippines	?–0	21–0	1995 AFC Women's Championship
9.	26 September 1995	Kota Kinabalu, Malaysia	Hong Kong	1–0	12–0	1995 AFC Women's Championship
10.	26 September 1995	Kota Kinabalu, Malaysia	Hong Kong	2–0	12–0	1995 AFC Women's Championship
11.	28 September 1995	Kota Kinabalu, Malaysia	Kazakhstan	2–0	7–0	1995 AFC Women's Championship
12.	28 September 1995	Kota Kinabalu, Malaysia	Kazakhstan	4–0	7–0	1995 AFC Women's Championship
13.	28 September 1995	Kota Kinabalu, Malaysia	Kazakhstan	6–0	7–0	1995 AFC Women's Championship
14.	21 July 1996	Miami, United States	Sweden	1–0	2–0	1996 Summer Olympics
15.	23 July 1996	Miami, United States	Denmark	1–0	5–1	1996 Summer Olympics
