= Nelly Viennot =

French football referee (born 1962)

- Full name: Nelly Andrée Danièle Viennot
- Born: 8 January 1962 (age 64); Flers, Orne, France

Domestic
| Years | League | Role |
| 2002– | Ligue 1 | Assistant referee |

International
| Years | League | Role |
| 1995– | FIFA-listed | Assistant referee |

Nelly Andrée Danièle Viennot, née Bodé (French: [nɛli vjɛno]; born 8 January 1962 in Flers, Orne), is a French football referee. An international woman's referee since 1995, she served as an assistant referee in the 2003 FIFA Women's World Cup.

Viennot attracted the attention of the wider football community when she was shortlisted, along with 82 other elite referees, as a possible assistant referee for the 2006 FIFA World Cup. Viennot attended a four-day FIFA workshop in Frankfurt, hoping to become one of the 60 referees eventually chosen as assistant referees for the world's largest football tournament. However, she failed a sprint test on 21 April 2006, ending her consideration for participation. She would have been the first ever female referee at a male World Cup; no other referee has come as close to officiating in the tournament.

Viennot's refereeing career began in 1987, and she refereed her first international woman's match on 1 January 1995. Since 2002 she has regularly refereed French football at the top levels, and made appearances in the UEFA Champions League.

== Honours ==
- Knight of the National Order of Merit: 2003
- Knight of the Legion of Honour: 2025
