= Cláudia Vasconcelos =

Brazilian football referee

- Full name: Cláudia Vasconcelos Guedes
- Born: 30 March 1963 (age 63); Rio de Janeiro, Brazil

Cláudia Vasconcelos Guedes (born 30 March 1963) is a Brazilian former football referee. At the 1991 FIFA Women's World Cup she became the first woman to referee a match in FIFA competition.
