= Sonia Denoncourt =

Canadian soccer referee

- Born: 25 June 1964 (age 62); Sherbrooke, Quebec

International
Years	League	Role
1994–2004	FIFA listed	Referee

Sonia Denoncourt (born June 25, 1964) is a retired soccer referee from Canada. She worked for FIFA as head of women's referee development, Director of Refereeing at Concacaf and currently work as the North America Academy Director at You Are The Ref International.

== Early life ==
Denoncourt was born in Sherbrooke, Quebec, Canada and attended Mitchell & Montcalm High School. She graduated from the Université de Sherbrooke with a degree in physical education and later attained a master's degree in Sports Administration from the University of Ottawa.

== Career ==
Denoncourt began refereeing in 1978 at the age of just 14 and later decided to give up playing the game to further her career as a referee at the age of 22. Denoncourt became the first female FIFA accredited referee in 1994. She went on to referee the 1995, 1999 and 2003 FIFA Women's World Cups.

=== 1996 Summer Olympics ===
Women's football was made its debut at the Summer Olympics in 1996 and Denoncourt was selected as one of four female referees that would officiate in the tournament and she refereed the first ever women's football match in the Olympics when she took charge of a match between Germany and Japan. She also officiated a semi-final match between Norway and United States and was the Fourth official in the final.

=== 1997 Campeonato Paulista ===
In February 1997, Denoncourt became the first female to referee a professional men's match in Brazil, when she officiated the opening Campeonato Paulista fixture between São José Esporte Clube and defending champions Sociedade Esportiva Palmeiras. Her performance was criticized by the away team's players, coach and supporters after she sent off Cafu and disallowed a goal by Djalminha.

=== 2000 Summer Olympics ===
Denoncourt was selected as one of the nine match officials that would participate in the 2000 Olympic football tournaments. She refereed two group matches, Australia vs. Sweden and Norway vs. China, and was picked to referee in the women's football final at the 2000 Olympics between Norway and United States.

== After retirement ==
She announced her retirement as a referee on 6 July 2004, stating: "It is a difficult decision as I am still in love with refereeing, but I guess it is time for me to move on with my life." In October 2005, Denoncourt was appointed by FIFA as its head of women's referee development after impressing as a refereeing instructor at the women's world under-19 championships in Thailand. In 2005, she was inducted into the Canadian Soccer Hall of Fame.Also inducted in Hall of Fame: • 2015 First women to be inducted to the CSA Life Membership Award • 2005 Inducted in the Canadian soccer Hall of Fame • 2004 Inducted in the Quebec soccer Hall of Fame • 2015 Inducted in the Hall of Fame for Sherbrooke City • Named Ambassador of the University of Sherbrooke for extended international career and accomplishments • Inducted in the Soccer Club “Les verts de Sherbrooke” • CAAWS award (Canadian Association for the Advancement Women in Sports and Physical Activity) as an international leader in women in sports

== Awards ==
- Quebec Soccer Federation's Referee of the Year (5): 1993, 1996, 1997, 1998, 1999
- Ray Morgan Memorial Award: 1995
