= Ingrid Jonsson =

Swedish football referee

Ingrid Jonsson (born 13 September 1959) is a Swedish former football referee. Jonsson is the first female Women's World Cup final referee, and the first to be assigned in multiple Women's World Cup finals.

Jonsson started her refereeing career in 1983, while still playing as a goalkeeper. By that time she was also a teacher in physical education. Since 1987 she was also a referee instructor for the Swedish Football Association.

In the first Women's World Cup in 1991 she was one of the six female assistant referees that participated. She was first assistant referee in the final match between Norway and the United States.

Jonsson refereed the final match of 1995 Women's World Cup and three matches in the 1996 Olympic football tournament in Atlanta (including the bronze medal match between Brazil and Norway).
