= 1999 FIFA Women's World Cup knockout stage =

Football competition stage

The knockout stage of the 1999 FIFA Women's World Cup was the second and final stage of the competition, following the group stage. It began on June 30 with the quarter-finals and ended on July 10, 1999, with the final match, held at the Rose Bowl in Pasadena. A total of eight teams (the top two teams from each group) advanced to the knockout stage to compete in a single-elimination style tournament.

All times listed are local time.

== Format ==
In all knockout matches apart from the third-place play-off, if a match was level at the end of 90 minutes of normal playing time, extra time was played (two periods of 15 minutes each). If still tied after extra time, the match was decided by a penalty shoot-out to determine the winner. If the third-place play-off was level at the end of 90 minutes of normal playing time, no extra time would be played, and the match would immediately be decided by a penalty shoot-out.

== Qualified teams ==
The top two placed teams from each of the four groups qualified for the knockout stage.

Group	Winners	Runners-up
A	United States	Nigeria
B	Brazil	Germany
C	Norway	Russia
D	China	Sweden

== Bracket ==
Quarterfinals
July 1 – Landover
United States	3
Germany	2
July 1 – Landover
Brazil (g.g.)	4
Nigeria	3
June 30 – San Jose
Norway	3
Sweden	1
June 30 – San Jose
China	2
Russia	0

Semifinals
July 4 – Stanford
United States	2
Brazil	0
July 4 – Foxborough
Norway	0
China	5

Final
July 10 – Pasadena
United States (p)	0 (5)
China	0 (4)
Third place playoff
July 10 – Pasadena
Brazil (p)	0 (5)
Norway	0 (4)

== Quarter-finals ==
=== China PR vs Russia ===
June 30, 1999
17:00 PDT (UTC−7)

China	2–0	Russia
Pu Wei 37'; Jin Yan 56'	Report

Spartan Stadium, San Jose
Attendance: 21,411
Referee: Nicole Petignat (Switzerland)

=== Norway vs Sweden ===
June 30, 1999
19:30 PDT (UTC−7)

Norway	3–1	Sweden
Aarønes 51'; Pettersen 58'; Riise 72' (pen.)	Report	Moström 90+1'

Spartan Stadium, San Jose
Attendance: 21,411
Referee: Im Eun-ju (South Korea)

=== United States vs Germany ===
July 1, 1999
19:00 EDT (UTC−4)

United States	3–2	Germany
Milbrett 16'; Chastain 49'; Fawcett 66'	Report	Chastain 5' (o.g.); Wiegmann 45+1'

Jack Kent Cooke Stadium, Landover
Attendance: 54,642
Referee: Martha Liliana Pardo (Colombia)

=== Brazil vs Nigeria ===
July 1, 1999
21:30 EDT (UTC−4)

Brazil	4–3 (a.e.t./g.g.)	Nigeria
Cidinha 4', 22'; Nenê 35'; Sissi 104'	Report	Emeafu 63'; Okosieme 72'; Egbe 85'

Jack Kent Cooke Stadium, Landover
Attendance: 54,642
Referee: Virginia Tovar (Mexico)

== Semi-finals ==
=== United States vs Brazil ===
July 4, 1999
13:30 PDT (UTC−7)

United States	2–0	Brazil
Parlow 5'; Akers 80' (pen.)	Report

Stanford Stadium, Stanford
Attendance: 73,123
Referee: Katriina Elovirta (Finland)

=== Norway vs China PR ===
July 4, 1999
19:30 EDT (UTC−4)

Norway	0–5	China
	Report	Sun Wen 3', 72' (pen.); Liu Ailing 14', 51'; Fan Yunjie 65'

Foxboro Stadium, Foxborough
Attendance: 28,986
Referee: Sonia Denoncourt (Canada)

== Third place playoff ==
July 10, 1999
10:15 PDT (UTC−7)

Brazil	0–0 (a.e.t.)	Norway
	Report
Penalties
Pretinha (penalty missed); Cidinha (penalty scored); Kátia (penalty scored); Maycon (penalty scored); Nenê (penalty scored); Formiga (penalty scored)	5–4	(penalty scored) Riise; (penalty scored) Pettersen; (penalty missed) Jørgensen; (penalty scored) Sandaune; (penalty scored) S. Gulbrandsen; (penalty missed) Aarønes

Rose Bowl, Pasadena
Attendance: 90,185
Referee: Im Eun-ju (South Korea)

== Final ==
July 10, 1999
12:50 PDT (UTC−7)

United States	0–0 (a.e.t.)	China
	Report
Penalties
Overbeck (penalty scored); Fawcett (penalty scored); Lilly (penalty scored); Hamm (penalty scored); Chastain (penalty scored)	5–4	(penalty scored) Xie Huilin; (penalty scored) Qiu Haiyan; (penalty missed) Liu Ying; (penalty scored) Zhang Ouying; (penalty scored) Sun Wen

Rose Bowl, Pasadena
Attendance: 90,185
Referee: Nicole Petignat (Switzerland)

United States	China PR

GK	1	Briana Scurry
RB	14	Joy Fawcett
CB	4	Carla Overbeck (c)
CB	20	Kate Sobrero
LB	6	Brandi Chastain
DM	10	Michelle Akers	(yellow card) 74'	(substituted off) 91'
CM	11	Julie Foudy
CM	13	Kristine Lilly
RW	9	Mia Hamm
CF	12	Cindy Parlow		(substituted off) 57'
LW	16	Tiffeny Milbrett		(substituted off) 115'
Substitutions:
MF	8	Shannon MacMillan		(substituted on) 57'
MF	7	Sara Whalen		(substituted on) 91'
MF	15	Tisha Venturini		(substituted on) 115'
Manager:
Tony DiCicco

GK	18	Gao Hong
RB	11	Pu Wei		(substituted off) 59'
CB	12	Wen Lirong
CB	3	Fan Yunjie
LB	14	Bai Jie
RM	2	Wang Liping
CM	10	Liu Ailing	(yellow card) 80'
CM	13	Liu Ying
LM	6	Zhao Lihong		(substituted off) 114'
CF	9	Sun Wen (c)
CF	8	Jin Yan		(substituted off) 119'
Substitutions:
FW	7	Zhang Ouying	(yellow card) 70'	(substituted on) 59'
MF	15	Qiu Haiyan		(substituted on) 114'
DF	5	Xie Huilin		(substituted on) 119'
Manager:
Ma Yuanan

Assistant referees:
Ghislaine Labbe (France)
Ana Pérez (Peru)
Fourth official:
Katriina Elovirta (Finland)
