= Russia at the FIFA Women's World Cup =

The Russia women's national football team has represented Russia at the FIFA Women's World Cup on two occasions, in 1999 and 2003.

== FIFA Women's World Cup record ==
World Cup Finals
Year	Round	Pld	W	D*	L	GF	GA	GD
(China) 1991	Did not enter							
(Sweden) 1995	Did not qualify							
(United States) 1999	Quarter-finals	4	2	0	2	10	5	+5
(United States) 2003	Quarter-finals	4	2	0	2	6	9	−3
(China) 2007	Did not qualify							
(Germany) 2011	Did not qualify							
(Canada) 2015	Did not qualify							
(France) 2019	Did not qualify							
(Australia) (New Zealand) 2023	Banned							
(Brazil) 2027	Banned							
(Costa Rica) (Jamaica) (Mexico) (United States) 2031	To be determined							
(United Kingdom) 2035	To be determined							
Total	2/12	8	4	0	4	16	14	+2

*Draws include knockout matches decided on penalty kicks.

FIFA Women's World Cup history
Year	Round	Date	Opponent	Result	Stadium
(United States) 1999	Group stage	20 June	Norway	L 1–2	Foxboro Stadium, Foxborough
(United States) 1999	Group stage	23 June	Japan	W 5–0	Civic Stadium, Portland
(United States) 1999	Group stage	26 June	Canada	W 4–1	Giants Stadium, East Rutherford
(United States) 1999	Quarter-finals	30 June	China	L 0–2	Spartan Stadium, San Jose
(United States) 2003	Group stage	21 September	Australia	W 2–1	The Home Depot Center, Carson
(United States) 2003	Group stage	25 September	Ghana	W 3–0	The Home Depot Center, Carson
(United States) 2003	Group stage	28 September	China	L 0–1	PGE Park, Portland
(United States) 2003	Quarter-finals	2 October	Germany	L 1–7	PGE Park, Portland

== 1999 FIFA Women's World Cup ==
=== Group C ===
Pos	Team	Pld	W	D	L	GF	GA	GD	Pts	Qualification
1	Norway	3	3	0	0	13	2	+11	9	Advance to knockout stage
2	Russia	3	2	0	1	10	3	+7	6	Advance to knockout stage
3	Canada	3	0	1	2	3	12	−9	1	
4	Japan	3	0	1	2	1	10	−9	1	

Source: FIFA
Rules for classification: Group stage tiebreakers
June 20, 1999
16:00 EDT (UTC−4)

Norway	2–1	Russia
Sandaune 28'; Pettersen 68'	Report	Komarova 78'

Foxboro Stadium, Foxborough
Attendance: 14,873
Referee: Zuo Xiudi (China PR)
June 23, 1999
18:00 PDT (UTC−7)

Japan	0–5	Russia
	Report	Savina 29'; Letyushova 52', 90'; N. Karasseva 58'; Barbashina 80'

Civic Stadium, Portland
Attendance: 17,668
Referee: Sandra Hunt (United States)
June 26, 1999
12:00 EDT (UTC−4)

Canada	1–4	Russia
Hooper 76'	Report	Grigorieva 54'; Fomina 66', 86'; O. Karasseva 90+1'

Giants Stadium, East Rutherford
Attendance: 29,401
Referee: Zuo Xiudi (China PR)

=== Quarterfinals ===
June 30, 1999
17:00 PDT (UTC−7)

China	2–0	Russia
Pu Wei 37'; Jin Yan 56'	Report

Spartan Stadium, San Jose
Attendance: 21,411
Referee: Nicole Petignat (Switzerland)

== 2003 FIFA Women's World Cup ==
=== Group D ===
Pos	Team	Pld	W	D	L	GF	GA	GD	Pts	Qualification
1	China	3	2	1	0	3	1	+2	7	Advance to knockout stage
2	Russia	3	2	0	1	5	2	+3	6	Advance to knockout stage
3	Ghana	3	1	0	2	2	5	−3	3	
4	Australia	3	0	1	2	3	5	−2	1	

Source: FIFA
Rules for classification: Group stage tiebreakers
September 21, 2003
17:30 PDT (UTC−7)

Australia	1–2	Russia
Golebiowski 38'	Report	Alagich 39' (o.g.); Fomina 89'

Home Depot Center, Carson
Attendance: 15,239
Referee: Bola Elizabeth Abidoye (Nigeria)
September 25, 2003
16:15 PDT (UTC−7)

Ghana	0–3	Russia
	Report	Saenko 36'; Barbashina 54'; Letyushova 80'

Home Depot Center, Carson
Attendance: 13,929
Referee: Kari Seitz (United States)
September 28, 2003
20:00 PDT (UTC−7)

China	1–0	Russia
Bai Jie 16'	Report

PGE Park, Portland
Attendance: 19,132
Referee: Florencia Romano (Argentina)

=== Quarterfinals ===
October 2, 2003
16:30 PDT (UTC−7)

Germany	7–1	Russia
Müller 25'; Minnert 57'; Wunderlich 60'; Garefrekes 62', 85'; Prinz 80', 89'	Report	Danilova 70'

PGE Park, Portland
Attendance: 20,012
Referee: Im Eun-ju (South Korea)

== Goalscorers ==
Player	Goals	1999	2003
Olga Letyushova	2	1	1
Natalia Barbashina	2	1	1
Elena Fomina	2	1	1
Galina Komarova	1	1	
Larisa Savina	1	1	
Natalia Karasseva	1	1	
Irina Grigorieva	1	1	
Olga Karasseva	1	1	
Marina Saenko	1		1
Elena Danilova	1		1
Own goals	1		1
Total	15	9	6

== Head-to-head record ==
Opponent	Pld	W	D	L	GF	GA	GD	Win %
Australia	1	1	0	0	2	1	+1	100.00
Canada	1	1	0	0	4	1	+3	100.00
China	2	0	0	2	0	3	−3	0.00
Germany	1	0	0	1	1	7	−6	0.00
Ghana	1	1	0	0	3	0	+3	100.00
Japan	1	1	0	0	5	0	+5	100.00
Norway	1	0	0	1	1	2	−1	0.00
Total	8	4	0	4	16	14	+2	50.00
