= List of FIFA Women's World Cup red cards =

This is a list of all occasions where a football player was sent off from a FIFA Women's World Cup match due to a foul or misconduct, either as a direct expulsion (red card) or as a second caution (yellow card) within the match. This list includes all dismissals since the first World Cup in 1991.

Only players are listed, even if they were at the substitutes' bench at the time of the sending off. Managers and other technical staff members are not covered.

== Statistics ==
- Lin Hui-fang was the first player to be sent off in a World Cup match, playing for Chinese Taipei against Nigeria in a 1991 match officiated by Rafael Rodríguez Medina.
- One dismissal has taken place during final matches: Japan's Azusa Iwashimizu against United States in 2011.
- Australia's Alicia Ferguson received the quickest red card, in the second minute in a game against China in 1999.
- Five goalkeepers have been sent off in the tournament: Chinese Taipei's Lin Hui-fang (1991), United States's Briana Scurry (1995), France's Bérangère Sapowicz (2011), Colombia's Catalina Pérez (2015), and Zambia's Catherine Musonda (2023).
- The team that has the greatest number of expulsed players is Nigeria, with 4 – in 4 different matches. The team whose opponents have received the most red cards is United States, with 5 – in 5 different matches.
- The 2023 World Cup had the largest number of red cards: a total of 6 players were sent off.

== Full list ==
| Tournament | # | M | Player | T | Time | Representing | At score | Final score | Opponent | Referee | Round | Date | Ref |
|---|---|---|---|---|---|---|---|---|---|---|---|---|---|
| 1991, China | 1. | 1. | Lin Hui-fang | Red card | 6' | Chinese Taipei | 0–0 | 2–0 | Nigeria | Rafael Rodríguez Medina (SLV) | Group stage | 21 November 1991 | |
| 1995, Sweden | 2. | 2. | Sonia Gegenhuber | Red card | 30' | Australia | 0–2 | 0–5 | Denmark | Bente Skogvang (NOR) | Group stage | 6 June 1995 | |
| 1995, Sweden | 3. | 3. | Briana Scurry | Red card | 88' | United States | 0–2 | 0–2 | Denmark | Engage Camara (GUI) | Group stage | 8 June 1995 | |
| 1995, Sweden | 4. | 4. | Suzy | Yellowred card | 63' | Brazil | 1–3 | 1–6 | Germany | Alain Hamer (LUX) | Group stage | 9 June 1995 | |
| 1995, Sweden | 5. | 5. | Heidi Støre | Yellowred card | 76' | Norway | 1–0 | 1–0 | United States | Alain Hamer (LUX) | Semi-finals | 15 June 1995 | |
| 1999, United States | 6. | 6. | Barikisu Tettey-Quao | Red card | 26' | Ghana | 0–0 | 1–1 | Australia | Kari Seitz (USA) | Group stage | 20 June 1999 | |
| 1999, United States | 7. | 7. | Regina Ansah | Red card | 53' | Ghana | 0–3 | 0–7 | China | Elke Günthner (GER) | Group stage | 23 June 1999 | |
| 1999, United States | 8. | 8. | Pak Jong-ae | Yellowred card | 86' | North Korea | 1–3 | 1–3 | Denmark | Martha Liliana Pardo (COL) | Group stage | 24 June 1999 | |
| 1999, United States | 9. | 9. | Alicia Ferguson | Red card | 2' | Australia | 0–0 | 1–3 | China | Sandra Hunt (USA) | Group stage | 26 June 1999 | |
| 1999, United States | 10. | 10. | Patience Avre | Red card | 87' | Nigeria | 3–3 | 3–4^{aet} | Brazil | Virginia Tovar (MEX) | Quarter-finals | 1 July 1999 | |
| 2003, United States | 11. | 11. | Natalia Gatti | Red card | 39' | Argentina | 0–2 | 0–6 | Japan | Katriina Elovirta (FIN) | Group stage | 20 September 2003 | |
| 2007, China | 12. | 12. | Catalina Pérez | Yellowred card | 49' | Argentina | 0–2 | 1–6 | England | Dianne Ferreira-James (GUY) | Group stage | 17 September 2007 | |
| 2007, China | 13. | 13. | Shannon Boxx | Yellowred card | 45+1' | United States | 0–2 | 0–4 | Brazil | Nicole Petignat (SUI) | Semi-finals | 27 September 2007 | |
| 2011, Germany | 14. | 14. | Bérangère Sapowicz | Red card | 65' | France | 1–2 | 2–4 | Germany | Kirsi Heikkinen (FIN) | Group stage | 5 July 2011 | |
| 2011, Germany | 15. | 15. | Rachel Buehler | Red card | 65' | United States | 1–0 | 2–2^{aet} (5–3^{pen}) | Brazil | Jacqui Melksham (AUS) | Quarter-finals | 10 July 2011 | |
| 2011, Germany | 16. | 16. | Josefine Öqvist | Red card | 68' | Sweden | 1–1 | 2–1 | France | Kari Seitz (USA) | Third place play-off | 16 July 2011 | |
| 2011, Germany | 17. | 17. | Azusa Iwashimizu | Red card | 120+1' | Japan | 2–2 | 2–2^{aet} (3–1^{pen}) | United States | Bibiana Steinhaus (GER) | Final | 17 July 2011 | |
| 2015, Canada | 18. | 18. | Ligia Moreira | Red card | 66' | Ecuador | 0–3 | 0–6 | Cameroon | Katalin Kulcsár (HUN) | Group stage | 8 June 2015 | |
| 2015, Canada | 19. | 19. | Sarah Nnodim | Yellowred card | 69' | Nigeria | 0–1 | 0–1 | United States | Kateryna Monzul (UKR) | Group stage | 16 June 2015 | |
| 2015, Canada | 20. | 20. | Catalina Pérez | Red card | 47' | Colombia | 0–0 | 0–2 | United States | Stéphanie Frappart (FRA) | Round of 16 | 22 June 2015 | |
| 2019, France | 21. | 21. | Nothando Vilakazi | Yellowred card | 81' | South Africa | 1–1 | 1–3 | Spain | María Carvajal (CHI) | Group stage | 8 June 2019 | |
| 2019, France | 22. | 22. | Ngozi Ebere | Yellowred card | 75' | Nigeria | 0–0 | 0–1 | France | Melissa Borjas (HON) | Group stage | 17 June 2019 | |
| 2019, France | 23. | 23. | Alanna Kennedy | Red card | 104' | Australia | 1–1 | 1–1^{aet} (1–4^{pen}) | Norway | Riem Hussein (GER) | Round of 16 | 22 June 2019 | |
| 2019, France | 24. | 24. | Millie Bright | Yellowred card | 86' | England | 1–2 | 1–2 | United States | Edina Alves Batista (BRA) | Semi-finals | 2 July 2019 | |
| 2023, Australia/New Zealand | 25. | 25. | Deborah Abiodun | Red card | 90+8' | Nigeria | 0–0 | 0–0 | Canada | Lina Lehtovaara (FIN) | Group stage | 21 July 2023 | |
| 2023, Australia/New Zealand | 26. | 26. | Catherine Musonda | Yellowred card | 90+7' | Zambia | 0–4 | 0–5 | Japan | Tess Olofsson (SWE) | Group stage | 22 July 2023 | |
| 2023, Australia/New Zealand | 27. | 27. | Khadija Shaw | Yellowred card | 90+2' | Jamaica | 0–0 | 0–0 | France | María Carvajal (CHI) | Group stage | 23 July 2023 | |
| 2023, Australia/New Zealand | 28. | 28. | Zhang Rui | Red card | 29' | China | 0–0 | 1–0 | Haiti | Marta Huerta de Aza (ESP) | Group stage | 28 July 2023 | |
| 2023, Australia/New Zealand | 29. | 29. | Sofia Harrison | Red card | 67' | Philippines | 0–5 | 0–6 | Norway | Marie-Soleil Beaudoin (CAN) | Group stage | 30 July 2023 | |
| 2023, Australia/New Zealand | 30. | 30. | Lauren James | Red card | 87' | England | 0–0 | 0–0^{aet} (4–2^{pen}) | Nigeria | Melissa Borjas (HON) | Round of 16 | 7 August 2023 | |
