= Football at the 2000 Summer Olympics – Women's qualification =

Eight teams competed in the women's football tournament at the 2000 Summer Olympics. In addition to the host nation, Australia, seven other teams qualified for the tournament based on the results from the 1999 FIFA Women's World Cup.

== Method ==
Unlike the men's competition, there was no fixed slot allocation for the women's tournament. Instead, the 1999 FIFA Women's World Cup would be used as the preliminary competition to qualify teams for the women's Olympic football tournament, which featured eight teams. Australia automatically qualified for the tournament as hosts, with the remaining spots going to the top seven teams at the Women's World Cup, excluding Australia. FIFA set the following qualification procedure to determine the remaining seven teams:

1. If Australia are one of the eight quarter-finalists, all eight will qualify for the Olympics.
2. If Australia are not one of the eight quarter-finalists, the four quarter-final winners and the three best-ranked quarter-final losers will qualify for the Olympics.

To determine the best three quarter-final losers, FIFA set the following ranking criteria:

1. Goal difference in the quarter-finals;
2. Number of goals scored in the quarter-finals;
3. Points obtained in all group matches (three points for a win, one for a draw, none for a defeat);
4. Goal difference in all group matches;
5. Number of goals scored in all group matches;
6. FIFA Fair Play ranking;
7. Drawing of lots.

== 1999 FIFA Women's World Cup ==
=== Qualification ===
Sixteen teams qualified for the 1999 FIFA Women's World Cup in the United States based on a fixed slot allocation.

Confederation	Slots	Tournament	Teams qualified
AFC (Asia)	3	1997 AFC Women's Championship	China; Japan; North Korea
CAF (Africa)	2	1998 African Women's Championship	Ghana; Nigeria
CONCACAF (North America, Central America and the Caribbean)	2.5	Host country	United States
CONCACAF (North America, Central America and the Caribbean)	2.5	1998 CONCACAF Women's Championship	Canada
CONCACAF (North America, Central America and the Caribbean)	2.5	CONCACAF v CONMEBOL play-off	Mexico
CONMEBOL (South America)	1.5	1998 South American Women's Football Championship	Brazil
OFC (Oceania)	1	1998 OFC Women's Championship	Australia
UEFA (Europe)	6	1999 FIFA Women's World Cup qualification (UEFA)	Denmark; Germany; Italy; Norway; Russia; Sweden

=== Group stage ===
Group A
Group B

Pos	Team	Pld	Pts
1	United States (H)	3	9
2	Nigeria	3	6
3	North Korea	3	3
4	Denmark	3	0

Source: FIFA
(H) Hosts

Pos	Team	Pld	Pts
1	Brazil	3	7
2	Germany	3	5
3	Italy	3	4
4	Mexico	3	0

Source: FIFA
Group C
Group D

Pos	Team	Pld	Pts
1	Norway	3	9
2	Russia	3	6
3	Canada	3	1
4	Japan	3	1

Source: FIFA

Pos	Team	Pld	Pts
1	China	3	9
2	Sweden	3	6
3	Australia	3	1
4	Ghana	3	1

Source: FIFA

=== Knockout stage ===
Quarterfinals
July 1 – Landover
United States	3
Germany	2
July 1 – Landover
Brazil (g.g.)	4
Nigeria	3
June 30 – San Jose
Norway	3
Sweden	1
June 30 – San Jose
China	2
Russia	0

Semifinals
July 4 – Stanford
United States	2
Brazil	0
July 4 – Foxborough
Norway	0
China	5

Final
July 10 – Pasadena
United States (p)	0 (5)
China	0 (4)
Third place playoff
July 10 – Pasadena
Brazil (p)	0 (5)
Norway	0 (4)

== Quarter-final ranking ==
As Australia were eliminated in the group stage, the results of the quarter-finals were used to determine the seven teams which would qualify. Although Russia and Sweden both lost by two goals, the Swedes had scored in their defeat while Russia did not, leaving them as the only quarter-finalist to not qualify for the Olympics.

Pos	Team	GF	GA	GD	Qualification
1	Norway	3	1	+2	Qualify for 2000 Summer Olympics
2	China	2	0	+2	Qualify for 2000 Summer Olympics
3	Brazil	4	3	+1	Qualify for 2000 Summer Olympics
4	United States	3	2	+1	Qualify for 2000 Summer Olympics
5	Nigeria	3	4	−1	Qualify for 2000 Summer Olympics
6	Germany	2	3	−1	Qualify for 2000 Summer Olympics
7	Sweden	1	3	−2	Qualify for 2000 Summer Olympics
8	Russia	0	2	−2	

Rules for classification: Tiebreakers

== Qualified teams ==
The following teams qualified for the 2000 Summer Olympic women's football tournament:

Team	Confederation	Qualified as	Qualified on	Previous appearances in Summer Olympics (Note: Bold indicates champions for that year. Italic indicates hosts for that year.)
Australia	OFC	Host	23 September 1993	0 (debut)
China	AFC	Women's World Cup runner-up	30 June 1999	1 (1996)
Norway	UEFA	Women's World Cup fourth place	30 June 1999	1 (1996)
Sweden	UEFA	3rd best quarter-final loser	30 June 1999	1 (1996)
Germany	UEFA	2nd best quarter-final loser	1 July 1999	1 (1996)
United States	CONCACAF	Women's World Cup winner	1 July 1999	1 (**1996**)
Brazil	CONMEBOL	Women's World Cup third place	1 July 1999	1 (1996)
Nigeria	CAF	1st best quarter-final loser	1 July 1999	0 (debut)

=== Breakdown by confederation ===
Confederation	Teams qualified
AFC	1
CAF	1
CONCACAF	1
CONMEBOL	1
OFC	1
UEFA	3
