= 1999 FIFA Women's World Cup Group C =

Football tournament group stage

Group C of the 1999 FIFA Women's World Cup took place from June 19 to 26, 1999. The group consisted of Canada, Japan, Norway and Russia.

== Standings ==
Pos	Team	Pld	W	D	L	GF	GA	GD	Pts	Qualification
1	Norway	3	3	0	0	13	2	+11	9	Advance to knockout stage
2	Russia	3	2	0	1	10	3	+7	6	Advance to knockout stage
3	Canada	3	0	1	2	3	12	−9	1	
4	Japan	3	0	1	2	1	10	−9	1	

Source: FIFA
Rules for classification: Group stage tiebreakers

== Matches ==
All times listed are local time.

=== Japan vs Canada ===
June 19, 1999
19:00 PDT (UTC−7)

Japan	1–1	Canada
Otake 64'	Report	Burtini 32'

Spartan Stadium, San Jose
Attendance: 23,298
Referee: Maria Edilene Siqueira (Brazil)

=== Norway vs Russia ===
June 20, 1999
16:00 EDT (UTC−4)

Norway	2–1	Russia
Sandaune 28'; Pettersen 68'	Report	Komarova 78'

Foxboro Stadium, Foxborough
Attendance: 14,873
Referee: Zuo Xiudi (China PR)

=== Norway vs Canada ===
June 23, 1999
18:00 EDT (UTC−4)

Norway	7–1	Canada
Aarønes 8', 36'; Lehn 49'; Riise 54'; Medalen 62'; Pettersen 76'; S. Gulbrandsen 87'	Report	Hooper 31'

Jack Kent Cooke Stadium, Landover
Attendance: 16,448
Referee: Tammy Ogston (Australia)

=== Japan vs Russia ===
June 23, 1999
18:00 PDT (UTC−7)

Japan	0–5	Russia
	Report	Savina 29'; Letyushova 52', 90'; N. Karasseva 58'; Barbashina 80'

Civic Stadium, Portland
Attendance: 17,668
Referee: Sandra Hunt (United States)

=== Canada vs Russia ===
June 26, 1999
12:00 EDT (UTC−4)

Canada	1–4	Russia
Hooper 76'	Report	Grigorieva 54'; Fomina 66', 86'; O. Karasseva 90+1'

Giants Stadium, East Rutherford
Attendance: 29,401
Referee: Zuo Xiudi (China PR)

=== Norway vs Japan ===
June 26, 1999
18:30 CDT (UTC−5)

Norway	4–0	Japan
Riise 8' (pen.); Isozaki 26' (o.g.); Aarønes 36'; Mellgren 61'	Report

Soldier Field, Chicago
Attendance: 34,256
Referee: Marisela Contreras (Venezuela)

== See also ==
- Canada at the FIFA Women's World Cup
- Japan at the FIFA Women's World Cup
- Norway at the FIFA Women's World Cup
- Russia at the FIFA Women's World Cup
