= Mexico at the FIFA Women's World Cup =

The Mexico women's national football team has represented Mexico at the FIFA Women's World Cup on three occasions, in 1999, 2011, and 2015.

== FIFA Women's World Cup record ==
FIFA Women's World Cup record
Year	Round	Position	MP	W	D*	L	GF	GA
(China) 1991	Did not qualify							
(Sweden) 1995	Did not qualify							
(United States) 1999	Group stage	16th	3	0	0	3	1	15
(United States) 2003	Did not qualify							
(China) 2007	Did not qualify							
(Germany) 2011	Group stage	11th	3	0	2	1	3	7
(Canada) 2015	Group stage	22nd	3	0	1	2	2	8
(France) 2019	Did not qualify							
(Australia) (New Zealand) 2023	Did not qualify							
(Brazil) 2027	To be determined							
(Costa Rica) (Jamaica) (Mexico) (United States) 2031	Qualified as co-host							
(United Kingdom) 2035	To be determined							
Total		4/12	9	0	3	6	6	30

*Draws include knockout matches decided on penalty kicks.

FIFA Women's World Cup Finals history
Year	Round	Date	Opponent	Result	Stadium
(United States) 1999	Group stage	19 June	Brazil	L 1–7	Giants Stadium, East Rutherford
(United States) 1999	Group stage	24 June	Germany	L 0–6	Civic Stadium, Portland
(United States) 1999	Group stage	27 June	Italy	L 0–2	Foxboro Stadium, Foxborough
(Germany) 2011	Group stage	27 June	England	D 1–1	Volkswagen Arena, Wolfsburg
(Germany) 2011	Group stage	1 July	Japan	L 0–4	BayArena, Leverkusen
(Germany) 2011	Group stage	5 July	New Zealand	D 2–2	Rhein-Neckar-Arena, Sinsheim
(Canada) 2015	Group stage	9 June	Colombia	D 1–1	Moncton Stadium, Moncton
(Canada) 2015	Group stage	13 June	England	L 1–2	Moncton Stadium, Moncton
(Canada) 2015	Group stage	17 June	France	L 0–5	TD Place, Ottawa

== 1999 FIFA Women's World Cup ==
=== Group D ===
Pos	Team	Pld	W	D	L	GF	GA	GD	Pts	Qualification
1	Brazil	3	2	1	0	12	4	+8	7	Advance to knockout stage
2	Germany	3	1	2	0	10	4	+6	5	Advance to knockout stage
3	Italy	3	1	1	1	3	3	0	4	
4	Mexico	3	0	0	3	1	15	−14	0	

Source: FIFA
Rules for classification: Group stage tiebreakers
June 19, 1999
17:30 EDT (UTC−4)

Brazil	7–1	Mexico
Pretinha 3', 12', 90+1'; Sissi 29', 42', 50'; Kátia 35' (pen.)	Report	Domínguez 10'

Giants Stadium, East Rutherford
Attendance: 78,972
Referee: Nicole Petignat (Switzerland)
June 24, 1999
20:30 PDT (UTC−7)

Germany	6–0	Mexico
Grings 10', 57', 90+2'; Smisek 45+1'; Hingst 49'; Lingor 89'	Report

Civic Stadium, Portland
Attendance: 20,129
Referee: Im Eun-ju (South Korea)
June 27, 1999
16:30 EDT (UTC−4)

Mexico	0–2	Italy
	Report	Panico 37'; Zanni 51'

Foxboro Stadium, Foxborough
Attendance: 50,484
Referee: Bola Elizabeth Abidoye (Nigeria)

== 2011 FIFA Women's World Cup ==
=== Group D ===
Pos	Team	Pld	W	D	L	GF	GA	GD	Pts	Qualification
1	England	3	2	1	0	5	2	+3	7	Advance to knockout stage
2	Japan	3	2	0	1	6	3	+3	6	Advance to knockout stage
3	Mexico	3	0	2	1	3	7	−4	2	
4	New Zealand	3	0	1	2	4	6	−2	1	

Source: FIFA
Rules for classification: Group stage tiebreakers
27 June 2011
18:00

Mexico	1–1	England
Ocampo 33'	Report	Williams 21'

Volkswagen Arena, Wolfsburg
Attendance: 18,702
Referee: Silvia Reyes (Peru)
1 July 2011
15:00

Japan	4–0	Mexico
Sawa 13', 39', 80'; Ohno 15'	Report

BayArena, Leverkusen
Attendance: 22,291
Referee: Christina Pedersen (Norway)
5 July 2011
18:15

New Zealand	2–2	Mexico
Smith 90'; Wilkinson 90+4'	Report	Mayor 2'; Domínguez 29'

Rhein-Neckar-Arena, Sinsheim
Attendance: 20,451
Referee: Jenny Palmqvist (Sweden)

== 2015 FIFA Women's World Cup ==
=== Group D ===
Pos	Team	Pld	W	D	L	GF	GA	GD	Pts	Qualification
1	France	3	2	0	1	6	2	+4	6	Advance to knockout stage
2	England	3	2	0	1	4	3	+1	6	Advance to knockout stage
3	Colombia	3	1	1	1	4	3	+1	4	Advance to knockout stage
4	Mexico	3	0	1	2	2	8	−6	1	

Source: FIFA
Rules for classification: Group stage tiebreakers
9 June 2015
17:00 ADT (UTC−3)

Colombia	1–1	Mexico
Montoya 82'	Report	V. Pérez 36'

Moncton Stadium, Moncton
Attendance: 11,686
Referee: Thérèse Neguel (Cameroon)
13 June 2015
17:00 ADT (UTC−3)

England	2–1	Mexico
Kirby 71'; Carney 82'	Report	Ibarra 90+1'

Moncton Stadium, Moncton
Attendance: 13,138
Referee: Anna-Marie Keighley (New Zealand)
17 June 2015
16:00 EDT (UTC−4)

Mexico	0–5	France
	Report	Delie 1'; Ruiz 9' (o.g.); Le Sommer 13', 36'; Henry 80'

TD Place Stadium, Ottawa
Attendance: 21,562
Referee: Sachiko Yamagishi (Japan)

== Goalscorers ==
Player	Goals	1999	2011	2015
Maribel Domínguez	2	1	1	
Mónica Ocampo	1		1	
Stephany Mayor	1		1	
Verónica Pérez	1			1
Fabiola Ibarra	1			1
Total	6	1	3	2

== Head-to-head record ==
Opponent	Pld	W	D	L	GF	GA	GD	Win %
Brazil	1	0	0	1	1	7	−6	0.00
Colombia	1	0	1	0	1	1	+0	0.00
England	2	0	1	1	2	3	−1	0.00
France	1	0	0	1	0	5	−5	0.00
Germany	1	0	0	1	0	6	−6	0.00
Italy	1	0	0	1	0	2	−2	0.00
Japan	1	0	0	1	0	4	−4	0.00
New Zealand	1	0	1	0	2	2	+0	0.00
Total	9	0	3	6	6	30	−24	0.00
