= 1999 FIFA Women's World Cup final =

Association football match

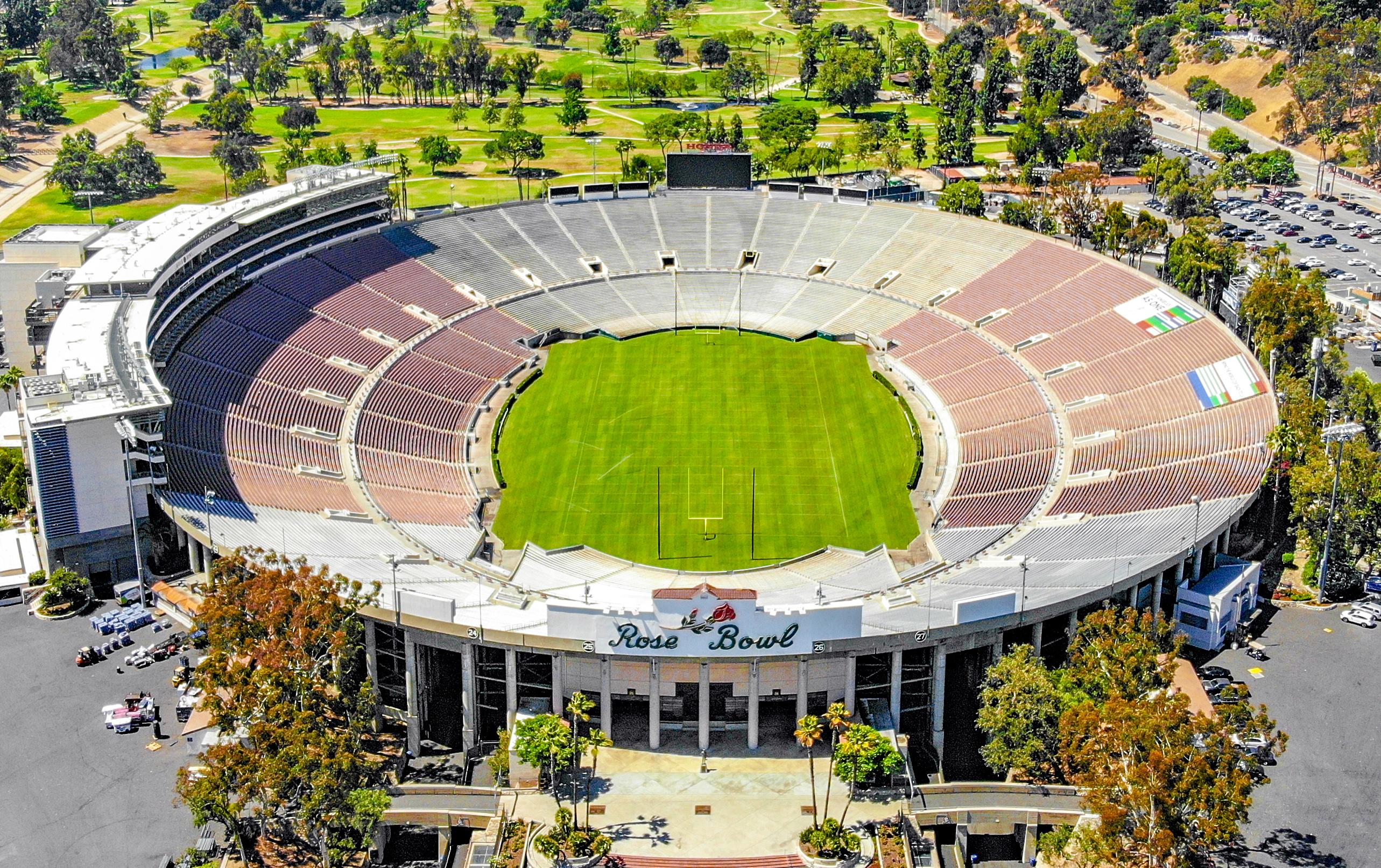
- The Rose Bowl in Pasadena hosted the final.
- Event: 1999 FIFA Women's World Cup
United States	China PR
0	0
- After golden goal extra time United States won 5–4 on penalties
- Date: July 10, 1999
- Venue: Rose Bowl, Pasadena
- Referee: Nicole Petignat (Switzerland)
- Attendance: 90,185

The 1999 FIFA Women's World Cup final was a soccer match that took place on July 10, 1999, to determine the winner of the 1999 FIFA Women's World Cup. The host United States and China played to a scoreless draw following double golden goal extra time. After that, the United States won the title 5–4 with a penalties victory.

The match represented one of the most important events in the history of American sports. It was played before over 90,000 fans. The well-known image of Brandi Chastain celebrating the winning spot kick that was featured on the cover of Sports Illustrated became one of the defining images of women's sports in the United States.

== Finalists ==
The match featured two powerhouses of women's soccer. The United States had won the first Women's World Cup in China and the gold medal at the 1996 Olympics. China had won the silver at the 1996 Olympics and had defeated the United States in the final of the 1999 Algarve Cup. The teams featured two of the superstars of women's soccer, strikers Mia Hamm of the United States and Sun Wen of China.

The United States was bidding to become the first team to win a world championship on home soil, something China had failed to do in 1991, as well as the first team to win multiple championships. China, meanwhile, was attempting to join the United States and Norway as World Cup champions.

China were the first Asian national team to reach the FIFA Women's World Cup Final. This was also the first Women's World Cup final not involving a European team.

== Route to the final ==
The United States had qualified automatically as host nation. Accordingly, they elected to skip the 1998 CONCACAF Women's Championship, which served as the CONCACAF qualifier. They would not fail to win a CONCACAF championship again until 2010. China had qualified by winning their sixth straight AFC Women's Championship in 1997.

Once at the finals, the United States reached the knockout stage by easily winning Group A. After trailing 2–1 at halftime, they advanced through the quarterfinals by defeating Germany 3–2. The United States then defeated Brazil 2–0 to reach the final.

China reached the knockout stage by winning Group D. They shut out Russia in the quarterfinals, then easily defeated defending champion Norway 5–0 to reach the final.

United States
Round
China PR
Opponent
Result
Group stage
Opponent
Result
Denmark
3–0
Match 1
Sweden
2–1
Nigeria
7–1
Match 2
Ghana
7–0
North Korea
3–0
Match 3
Australia
3–1

Pos	Team	Pld	Pts
1	United States (H)	3	9
2	Nigeria	3	6
3	North Korea	3	3
4	Denmark	3	0

Source: FIFA
(H) Hosts
Final standing

Pos	Team	Pld	Pts
1	China	3	9
2	Sweden	3	6
3	Australia	3	1
4	Ghana	3	1

Source: FIFA
Opponent
Result
Knockout stage
Opponent
Result
Germany
3–2
Quarterfinals
Russia
2–0
Brazil
2–0
Semifinals
Norway
5–0

== Venue ==
The final was played at the Rose Bowl in Pasadena, California, which sold out of its 90,000 seats. Tickets for the final and third-place match doubleheader were sold from $45 to $110. Prior to the match, tickets were sold outside the stadium for as much as $4,000 and 35 people were arrested by local police for ticket scalping. Among the attendees were U.S. president Bill Clinton, California governor Gray Davis, and various celebrities.

== Match ==
=== Summary ===
The match was played on July 10, 1999, shortly after the third-place match at the same venue. The United States and China played to a scoreless draw during regulation and golden goal extra time. The United States won the title 5–4 on a penalty shootout. The win gave the United States its second world cup title.

The game was a tepid affair with neither side getting many chances. Perhaps the best chance for either team to score came in extra time, when China's Fan Yunjie hit a header toward the post that was defended by Kristine Lilly.

After both teams failed to score, the teams squared off for a shootout to decide the winners of the cup. China shot first, and Xie Huilin scored, only to be matched by the United States' Carla Overbeck. In the second round, Qiu Haiyan's goal was matched by Joy Fawcett.

Liu Ying was China's third-round shooter, but her shot was saved by United States goalkeeper Briana Scurry. Despite Scurry coming well off her line (a violation that should have resulted in a re-kick for Liu), the save stood. Kristine Lilly then got a shot past Chinese goalkeeper Gao Hong to give the United States the advantage.

Zhang Ouying, Mia Hamm, and Sun Wen each converted their penalty opportunities, leaving the United States' Brandi Chastain with a shot to win the tournament. She put the ball past Gao, leading to an ecstatic celebration by the Americans, who had clinched the title on home soil.

=== Details ===
July 10, 1999
12:50 PDT

United States	0–0 (a.e.t.)	China
	Report
Penalties
Overbeck (penalty scored); Fawcett (penalty scored); Lilly (penalty scored); Hamm (penalty scored); Chastain (penalty scored)	5–4	(penalty scored) Xie Huilin; (penalty scored) Qiu Haiyan; (penalty missed) Liu Ying; (penalty scored) Zhang Ouying; (penalty scored) Sun Wen

Rose Bowl, Pasadena
Attendance: 90,185
Referee: Nicole Petignat (Switzerland)

United States	China PR

GK	1	Briana Scurry
RB	14	Joy Fawcett
CB	4	Carla Overbeck (c)
CB	20	Kate Sobrero
LB	6	Brandi Chastain
DM	10	Michelle Akers	(yellow card) 74'	(substituted off) 91'
CM	11	Julie Foudy
CM	13	Kristine Lilly
RW	9	Mia Hamm
CF	12	Cindy Parlow		(substituted off) 57'
LW	16	Tiffeny Milbrett		(substituted off) 115'
Substitutions:
MF	8	Shannon MacMillan		(substituted on) 57'
MF	7	Sara Whalen		(substituted on) 91'
MF	15	Tisha Venturini		(substituted on) 115'
Manager:
Tony DiCicco

GK	18	Gao Hong
RB	11	Pu Wei		(substituted off) 59'
CB	12	Wen Lirong
CB	3	Fan Yunjie
LB	14	Bai Jie
RM	2	Wang Liping
CM	10	Liu Ailing	(yellow card) 80'
CM	13	Liu Ying
LM	6	Zhao Lihong		(substituted off) 114'
CF	9	Sun Wen (c)
CF	8	Jin Yan		(substituted off) 119'
Substitutions:
FW	7	Zhang Ouying	(yellow card) 70'	(substituted on) 59'
MF	15	Qiu Haiyan		(substituted on) 114'
DF	5	Xie Huilin		(substituted on) 119'
Manager:
Ma Yuanan

Assistant referees:
Ghislaine Labbe (France)
Ana Pérez (Peru)
Fourth official:
Katriina Elovirta (Finland)

== Post-match ==
The United States became the first team to win two Women's World Cup titles. Brandi Chastain's celebration, which ended with her removing her jersey and revealing her sports bra underneath, appeared on the covers of Sports Illustrated, Time, and various newspapers the following day. The celebration was criticized for being disrespectful, unfeminine, or inappropriate, but has endured as one of the most iconic moments in women's sports history. Chinese media protested Scurry's save on Liu Ying, accusing her of cheating for stepping ahead of the line before Liu kicked the ball; Scurry confirmed that she did intentionally step over the line, but stated that "everybody does it".

The final and tournament as a whole created greater interest in women's soccer, particularly the United States team, and broke attendance and television records for women's sports. Its reported attendance of 90,185 set a new international record for a women's sporting event, although the unofficial 1971 Women's World Cup final at the Estadio Azteca in Mexico City was seen by an estimated 110,000 people. This record was broken in 2022 when the second leg of the UEFA Women's Champions League quarterfinal between archrivals FC Barcelona and Real Madrid drew 91,553 to Camp Nou in Barcelona. The final averaged 17.9 million viewers and peaked at 40 million on U.S. broadcast television, which remained unsurpassed until the 2014 men's World Cup and the 2015 FIFA Women's World Cup Final.

== See also ==
- China at the FIFA Women's World Cup
- United States at the FIFA Women's World Cup
