= 1999 FIFA Women's World Cup Group D =

Football tournament group stage

Group D of the 1999 FIFA Women's World Cup took place from June 19 to 26, 1999. The group consisted of Australia, China PR, Ghana and Sweden.

Three of these teams were also drawn together in Group D of the next World Cup in 2003 (the exception was Sweden, whose place was taken by fellow Europeans Russia).

== Standings ==
Pos	Team	Pld	W	D	L	GF	GA	GD	Pts	Qualification
1	China	3	3	0	0	12	2	+10	9	Advance to knockout stage
2	Sweden	3	2	0	1	6	3	+3	6	Advance to knockout stage
3	Australia	3	0	1	2	3	7	−4	1	
4	Ghana	3	0	1	2	1	10	−9	1	

Source: FIFA
Rules for classification: Group stage tiebreakers

== Matches ==
All times listed are local time.

=== China PR vs Sweden ===
June 19, 1999
17:00 PDT (UTC−7)

China	2–1	Sweden
Jin Yan 17'; Liu Ailing 69'	Report	Bengtsson 2'

Spartan Stadium, San Jose
Attendance: 23,298
Referee: Virginia Tovar (Mexico)

=== Australia vs Ghana ===
June 20, 1999
19:30 EDT (UTC−4)

Australia	1–1	Ghana
Murray 74'	Report	Gyamfuah 76'

Foxboro Stadium, Foxborough
Attendance: 14,873
Referee: Kari Seitz (United States)

=== Australia vs Sweden ===
June 23, 1999
20:30 EDT (UTC−4)

Australia	1–3	Sweden
Murray 32'	Report	Törnqvist 8'; Ljungberg 21', 69'

Jack Kent Cooke Stadium, Landover
Attendance: 16,448
Referee: Fatou Gaye (Senegal)

=== China PR vs Ghana ===
June 23, 1999
20:30 PDT (UTC−7)

China	7–0	Ghana
Sun Wen 9', 21', 54'; Jin Yan 16'; Zhang Ouying 82', 90+1'; Zhao Lihong 90+2'	Report

Civic Stadium, Portland
Attendance: 17,668
Referee: Elke Günthner (Germany)

=== China PR vs Australia ===
June 26, 1999
14:30 EDT (UTC−4)

China	3–1	Australia
Sun Wen 39', 51'; Liu Ying 73'	Report	Salisbury 66'

Giants Stadium, East Rutherford
Attendance: 29,401
Referee: Sandra Hunt (United States)

=== Ghana vs Sweden ===
June 26, 1999
16:00 CDT (UTC−5)

Ghana	0–2	Sweden
	Report	Svensson 58', 86'

Soldier Field, Chicago
Attendance: 34,256
Referee: Sonia Denoncourt (Canada)

== See also ==
- Australia at the FIFA Women's World Cup
- China at the FIFA Women's World Cup
- Ghana at the FIFA Women's World Cup
- Sweden at the FIFA Women's World Cup
