= 1999 FIFA Women's World Cup =

1999 edition of the FIFA Women's World Cup

FIFA Women's World Cup USA '99
- Tournament logo

Tournament details
- Host country: United States
- Dates: June 19 – July 10
- Teams: 16
- Venues: 8 (in 8 host cities)

Final positions
- Champions: United States (2nd title)
- Runners-up: China
- Third place: Brazil
- Fourth place: Norway

Tournament statistics
- Matches played: 32
- Goals scored: 123 (3.84 per match)
- Attendance: 1,214,221 (37,944 per match)
- Top scorer(s): (Brazil) Sissi (China) Sun Wen (7 goals each)
- Best player: (China) Sun Wen
- Fair play award: China

The 1999 FIFA Women's World Cup was the third edition of the FIFA Women's World Cup, the world championship for women's national soccer teams. It was hosted as well as won by the United States and took place from June 19 to July 10, 1999, at eight venues across the country. The tournament was the most successful FIFA Women's World Cup in terms of attendance, television ratings, and public interest.

The 1999 edition was the first to field sixteen teams, an increase from the twelve in 1995, and featured an all-female roster of referees and match officials. It was played primarily in large American football venues due to expected demand following the successful 1996 Olympics women's tournament. The average attendance was 37,319 spectators per match and the total attendance was 1.194 million, a record that stood until 2015. The tournament earned a profit of $4 million on its $30 million operating budget.

The final, played at the Rose Bowl in Pasadena, California, was attended by 90,185 people, setting an international record for spectators at a women's sporting event. The United States won the tournament by defeating China in a penalty shootout after a scoreless draw. The 5–4 shootout ended with Brandi Chastain scoring the winning penalty with her team's fifth kick, following an earlier miss by China's Liu Ying. Chinese forward Sun Wen and Brazilian midfielder Sissi were the joint top goalscorers of the tournament, with seven goals each.

The tournament was considered a "watershed moment" for women's soccer in the U.S. that increased interest and participation in women's soccer. A new professional league, the Women's United Soccer Association, was established following the tournament, and played three seasons before folding because of financial difficulties. The United States also hosted the next World Cup in 2003, which was played in smaller venues and ended with the host team finishing in third place.

== Background ==
The 1999 FIFA Women's World Cup was the third edition of the FIFA Women's World Cup, the international women's championship created by FIFA following several precursor tournaments that were organized to test its feasibility. International women's soccer had gained popularity in the 1970s, following the easing of gender sanctions by national associations, and competitions were organized between national teams, including the Mundialito and Women's World Invitational Tournament. A FIFA-organized women's tournament was hosted by China in 1988 and was followed by the announcement of the first FIFA Women's World Cup, to be hosted by China in 1991. The tournament, which had several modified rules and was officially known as the 1st FIFA World Championship for Women's Football for the M&M's Cup until retroactively given the World Cup moniker, was considered a success by FIFA and was followed up by the second World Cup in Sweden four years later with greater media attention but played in front of smaller crowds averaging under 4,500.

=== Host selection ===
The United States Soccer Federation announced their intention to bid for the 1999 FIFA Women's World Cup in February 1995, shortly after hosting the successful 1994 men's World Cup. Australia and Chile both announced their intention to bid but withdrew from the process in December 1995. This left the United States as the sole applicant by the March 1996 deadline for bids. The FIFA Executive Committee officially awarded hosting rights to the United States on May 31, 1996, the same day that the 2002 men's World Cup was jointly awarded to Japan and South Korea.

== Venues ==
With the exception of the semifinals, the tournament's 32 matches were organized into 15 doubleheaders, consisting of two matches played back-to-back in the same stadium. The semifinals were played in separate venues, but organized as doubleheaders hosted by the San Jose Clash and New England Revolution of Major League Soccer. Eight venues were used for the tournament: three on the East Coast, four on the West Coast, and one in Chicago. Most of the stadiums were American football venues with higher capacities than many of the stadiums used in the first two tournaments. At FIFA's request, the tournament's organizers had originally planned to use five smaller college football venues on the East Coast located in a single time zone. The final match would be staged at RFK Memorial Stadium in Washington, D.C. Following the success of the inaugural women's soccer tournament at the 1996 Summer Olympics, which had high attendances and culminated in 76,489 watching the gold medal match, the organizing committee chose to use larger stadiums instead and received 15 bids in 1997.

The eight venues and host cities were announced on November 19, 1997, including five large American football venues that were used in the 1994 men's World Cup. The tournament final was awarded to the Rose Bowl in Pasadena, California, which reprised its role from the 1984 Summer Olympics gold medal match and the 1994 men's final. The opening match would be played at Giants Stadium in East Rutherford, New Jersey, near New York City. The tournament's organizing committee estimated that the 1999 World Cup would average an attendance of 25,000 per match, with U.S. matches and later knockout ties at near sellouts in the larger venues. Jack Kent Cooke Stadium in Landover, Maryland, serving the Washington, D.C. market, had a limited capacity of 41,000 seats because of ongoing construction during the group stage. It was later raised to 55,000 for the quarterfinals.

Two smaller venues, Civic Stadium in Portland, Oregon, and Spartan Stadium in San Jose, California, were chosen to each host several group stage matches and one quarterfinal doubleheader. For the tournament, Civic Stadium was outfitted with a temporary grass field that was laid over its artificial turf surface, which debuted during a warm-up friendly on June 6. Other venues underwent small modifications to host the tournament's matches, including converting American football locker rooms to accommodate more teams and changing the dimensions of the playing field.

Ticket pre-sales at discounted prices began in October 1997 and over 300,000 were sold by April 1999. By early June, ticket sales had reached 500,000—setting a new record for a women's sporting event by surpassing the NCAA women's basketball tournament. The opening weekend's eight matches were organized into four doubleheaders that attracted a total of 134,236 spectators, surpassing the total attendance for the 1995 World Cup; the United States–Denmark match drew a crowd of 78,972 at Giants Stadium in New Jersey, setting a new U.S. record for attendance at a women's sporting event. That figure was later surpassed by the final, played between the United States and China at the Rose Bowl in front of a crowd of 90,185 spectators—a world record for women's sports.

Los Angeles (Pasadena, California)	San Francisco (Stanford, California)	Washington, D.C. (Landover, Maryland)	New York/New Jersey (East Rutherford, New Jersey)
Rose Bowl	Stanford Stadium	Jack Kent Cooke Stadium	Giants Stadium
Capacity: 95,542	Capacity: 85,429	Capacity: 80,116	Capacity: 77,716
A satellite view of the Rose Bowl stadium	A view of Stanford Stadium from the stands, showing the pitch encircled by a running track	A satellite view of Jack Kent Cooke Stadium	An aerial view of Giants Stadium
Venues of the 1999 FIFA Women's World Cup in the United States; Source: FIFA Technical Report
Chicago	Boston (Foxborough, Massachusetts)	Portland	San Jose
Soldier Field	Foxboro Stadium	Civic Stadium	Spartan Stadium
Capacity: 65,080	Capacity: 58,868	Capacity: 27,396	Capacity: 26,000
An aerial view of Soldier Field with the Chicago skyline in the background	A satellite view of Foxboro Stadium	An overhead view of PGE Park, showing the stands and a nearby street	A view of Spartan Stadium during a football game from the stands

== Participating teams and officials ==
=== Qualification ===
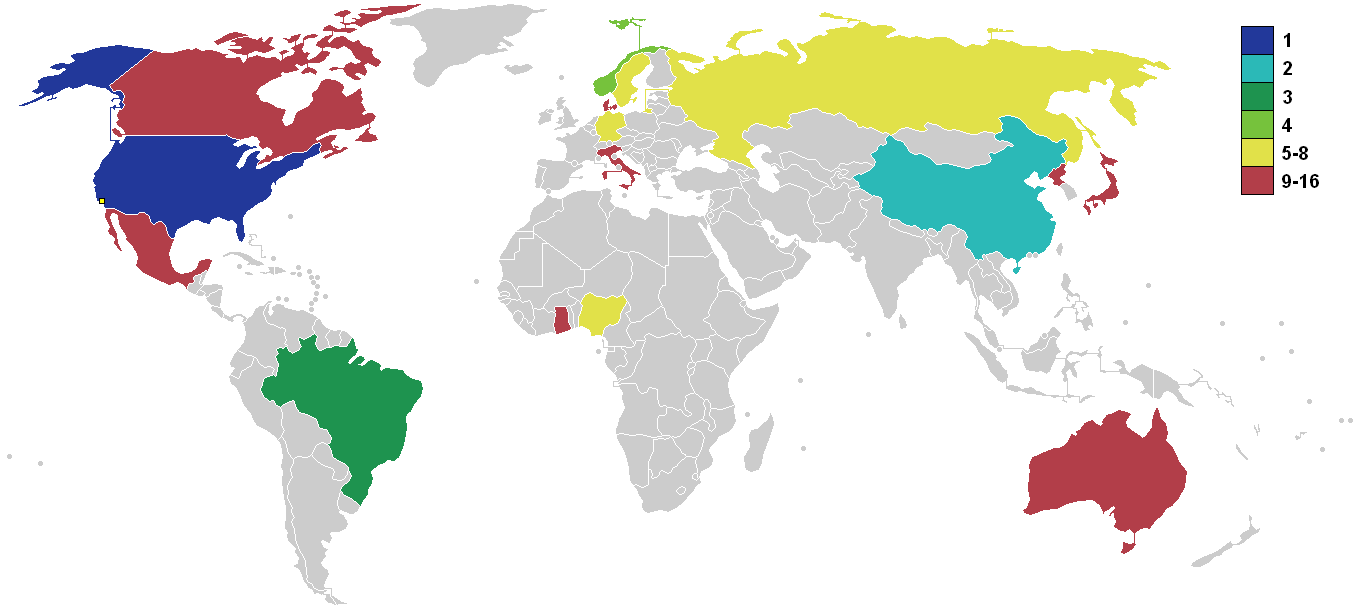
Map of qualified countries and their final ranking in the tournament

The 1999 Women's World Cup had sixteen participating teams, an increase from the twelve in 1995 and the largest field in the tournament's history. Ghana, Mexico, North Korea, and Russia all made their Women's World Cup debuts at the 1999 tournament, with Mexico being the first Spanish-speaking country to qualify while Russia being the first Slavic country to qualify. Of the remaining twelve teams, three were returning for their second tournament; nine had participated in all three editions since 1991. The tournament's seven best quarter-finalists also qualified for the 2000 Sydney Olympics alongside hosts Australia.

The United States was granted automatic qualification as the host. The remaining participants were determined through a series of six tournaments run by the continental confederations of world soccer from 1997 to 1998; these comprised 63 countries playing in 141 matches. FIFA allocated six berths to Europe; three to Asia; two to Africa; and one each to North America (excluding the hosts), Oceania, and South America. Another berth (for Mexico) was determined by a play-off series between the second-place finishers in the North and South American tournaments.

- Africa (CAF)
  - Nigeria
  - Ghana
- Asia (AFC)
  - North Korea
  - China
  - Japan
- South America (CONMEBOL)
  - Brazil
- Oceania (OFC)
  - Australia
- Europe (UEFA)
  - Denmark
  - Germany
  - Russia
  - Norway
  - Sweden
  - Italy
- North America, Central America & Caribbean (CONCACAF)
  - Canada
  - Mexico (via play-off)
  - United States (host nation – automatically qualified)

=== Draw ===
The tournament's final draw took place on February 14, 1999, on a temporary outdoor stage at Spartan Stadium in San Jose, California. It was televised live by ESPN during the halftime of an exhibition match between the United States women's team and the FIFA Women's World Stars at the stadium. The United States lost the match 2–1, their first home defeat in more than 40 matches.

The draw was conducted using four pots of four teams each. The four highest-ranked teams, China, Germany, Norway, and the United States, were seeded into Pot A. The remaining pots were organized based on geographic location, with four European teams in Pot B, South America, Asia, and Oceania represented in Pot C, and North America and Africa in Pot D. The United States was placed in slot A1, separated from Canada and Mexico; similarly, China was separated from Japan and North Korea in the draw.

As a result of the restrictions in seeding and pot placement, two of the World Cup groups each contained two European teams. Group B was dubbed the "group of death" because it contained non-seeded Brazil, an Olympic semi-finalist, alongside Germany, Italy, and Mexico. The teams drawn in Groups C and D were switched to place China's opening match at Spartan Stadium in San Jose, with hopes of attracting the San Francisco Bay Area's Chinese-American community.

Pot A	Pot B	Pot C	Pot D
United States (A1); China; Germany; Norway	Denmark; Italy; Russia; Sweden	Australia; Brazil; Japan; North Korea	Canada; Ghana; Mexico; Nigeria

=== Squads ===
Each team's squad for the 1999 FIFA Women's World Cup consisted of 20 players, the same as the 1995 tournament. The sixteen participating national associations were required to confirm their final rosters no later than June 9, 1999. Three days after the deadline, the full rosters were published by FIFA on their website. Several teams, including the United States, Canada, and Mexico, drew much of their roster from U.S. college teams. The oldest player at the tournament was Norwegian captain Linda Medalen, who turned 34 before the opening matchday, while the youngest was 16-year-old Ifeanyi Chiejine of Nigeria.

=== Match officials ===
The 1999 tournament was the first World Cup to feature a pool of 31 referees composed entirely of women—the result of a directive from FIFA president Sepp Blatter approved the year before. They worked in groups during matching and training and were divided between two base facilities in Los Angeles and Washington, D.C. to reduce travel. Before the tournament, several coaches raised concerns over the quality of the referee pool, particularly those chosen for geographic diversity. By the end of the group stage, several coaches had complained of inconsistent fouls and offside calls. This was blamed in part on the referees being inexperienced with working in front of large crowds. In a post-tournament report, FIFA stated that the trial of all-female referees had been successful and that further development would produce better results in future tournaments.

FIFA published the final list of referees on April 13, 1999. From this list, only Ghanaian assistant referee Juliana Akuteye did not officiate at the tournament. American referee Kari Seitz was selected in June as a replacement for another official who had been denied a travel visa to the United States.

Referees
Confederation	Referee
AFC	Im Eun-ju (South Korea)
AFC	Zuo Xiudi (China PR)
CAF	Bola Elizabeth Abidoye (Nigeria)
CAF	Fatou Gaye (Senegal)
CONCACAF	Sonia Denoncourt (Canada)
CONCACAF	Sandra Hunt (United States)
CONCACAF	Kari Seitz (United States)
CONCACAF	Virginia Tovar (Mexico)
CONMEBOL	Marisela de Fuentes (Venezuela)
CONMEBOL	Maria Edilene Siqueira (Brazil)
CONMEBOL	Martha Toro Pardo (Colombia)
OFC	Tammy Ogston (Australia)
UEFA	Katriina Elovirta (Finland)
UEFA	Elke Günthner (Germany)
UEFA	Gitte Nielsen (Denmark)
UEFA	Nicole Petignat (Switzerland)

Assistant referees
Confederation	Assistant referee
AFC	Lu Lijuan (China PR)
AFC	Ri Song-ok (North Korea)
AFC	Hisae Yoshizawa (Japan)
CAF	Adeola Omoleye Adeyemi (Nigeria)
CAF	Comfort Cofie (Ghana)
CONCACAF	Boni Bishop (Trinidad and Tobago)
CONCACAF	María del Socorro Rodríguez (Mexico)
CONCACAF	Jackeline Sáez Blanquice (Panama)
CONMEBOL	Ana Bia Batista (Brazil)
CONMEBOL	Cleidy Mary Nunes Ribeiro (Brazil)
CONMEBOL	Ana Isabel Pérez Assante (Peru)
UEFA	Susanne Borg (Sweden)
UEFA	Ann Wenche Kleven (Norway)
UEFA	Corrie Kruithof (Netherlands)
UEFA	Ghislaine Peron-Labbé (France)

== Preparations ==
The organizing committee for the 1999 tournament was led by chairwoman Donna de Varona, a former Olympian swimmer and co-founder of the Women's Sports Foundation, and president Marla Messing, an attorney and protégé of U.S. soccer president Alan Rothenberg who had helped organize the 1994 men's World Cup in the United States. Headquartered in Century City, California, it had a $30 million budget for the tournament, a tenth of that for the men's tournament. It was partially funded by a $2.5 million loan from the U.S. Soccer Foundation using profits from the 1994 men's World Cup. Messing submitted the committee's business plan for the tournament in September 1998, two days before giving birth.

The event attracted funding from several major corporate sponsors who had previously shied away from women's soccer, including: McDonald's, Coca-Cola, Fujifilm, Gillette, and Allstate; the companies, however, did not promote the tournament through advertising and tie-in campaigns like they did for the 1994 men's World Cup. The tournament's official equipment sponsor was Adidas, who supplied the match balls and other equipment. A new Women's World Cup Trophy was commissioned for the tournament, designed by William Sawaya of Sawaya & Moroni. It cost $30,000 to design and assemble the 4.6-kilogram (10 lb) trophy. Following a bureaucratic issue that prevented it from being displayed at the February draw, it was unveiled on April 19, 1999. FIFA also organized several other business events during the tournament, including the FIFA Women's Football Symposium and an extraordinary session of the FIFA Congress. Both took place in Los Angeles before the final.

Following the bombing of the Chinese embassy in Belgrade a few weeks before the tournament, organizers feared the Chinese team would pull out of the World Cup. However, the team played as planned and reached the final, and the presidents of the United States and China exchanged congratulatory messages. The closing of the U.S. embassy in Beijing also affected the visa process for the North Korean team and staff, as the country did not have formal diplomatic relations with the U.S., but their visas were approved in time for the tournament.

=== Media and marketing ===
All 32 matches were televised in the United States on ABC, ESPN, and ESPN2, of which 26 were live broadcasts and six were tape delayed. The network also carried some matches in 70 other countries on its affiliated channels. Lifetime Television produced several documentaries and special programs for the World Cup. Eurosport broadcast most matches live across 55 countries, while local broadcasters in several countries also carried matches. The Women's National Basketball Association (WNBA), the largest women's professional sports league in the country, rescheduled several games to avoid clashing with World Cup fixtures. It also cross-promoted the tournament during its television broadcasts. Over 2,000 accredited journalists covered the event, including 950 writers, 410 photographers, and 600 broadcast personnel. Several major newspapers in the United States sent reporters to cover matches, with credentialed staff growing in number as the tournament went on, while others declined to produce content beyond wire reports.

The official slogan of the tournament was "This is my game. This is my future. Watch me play." It was unveiled alongside the logo and branding in July 1997. Tickets were marketed primarily to young girls and their fathers, rather than the stereotypical "soccer mom", and sold out quickly. The organizing committee sponsored and arranged training camps and other events for youth soccer players in host cities. Some of these included appearances by members of the United States team to advertise the tournament and invite players and their families to attend matches. Boy band 'N Sync and pop performers B*Witched and Billie performed at the opening ceremony for the Women's World Cup at Giants Stadium; Billie's single "Because We Want To" was chosen as the tournament's official song. Jennifer Lopez performed at the closing ceremony before the final, where she also recorded an official music video for her single "Let's Get Loud".

== Group stage ==
The sixteen participating teams were organized into four groups, labeled A to D, by the final draw on February 14, 1999. The group stage consisted of 24 matches played in a round-robin format, in which each team played one match against the other three in their group. Teams were awarded three points for a win, one point for a draw, and none for a defeat. The winners and runners-up from each group qualified for the first round of the knockout stage, which began with the quarter-finals on June 30, 1999.

Tie-breaking criteria for group play
The ranking of teams in the group stage was determined as follows:
1. Points obtained in all group matches (three points for a win, one for a draw, none for a defeat);
2. Goal difference in all group matches;
3. Number of goals scored in all group matches;
4. Points obtained in the matches played between the teams in question;
5. Goal difference in the matches played between the teams in question;
6. Number of goals scored in the matches played between the teams in question;
7. Drawing of lots.

=== Group A ===
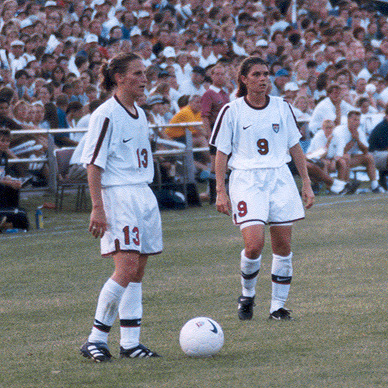
Kristine Lilly (left) and Mia Hamm (right) both scored goals in the first two group stage matches for the United States

Pos	Team	Pld	W	D	L	GF	GA	GD	Pts	Qualification
1	United States (H)	3	3	0	0	13	1	+12	9	Advance to knockout stage
2	Nigeria	3	2	0	1	5	8	−3	6	Advance to knockout stage
3	North Korea	3	1	0	2	4	6	−2	3	
4	Denmark	3	0	0	3	1	8	−7	0	

Source: FIFA
(H) Hosts

Hosts and 1991 champions United States were placed in Group A alongside Denmark, who were undefeated in European qualification, Nigeria, champions of the African qualifying competition, and North Korea in their World Cup debut. The United States defeated Denmark 3–0 in the opening match, played on June 19 in front of a record 78,972 at Giants Stadium, with goals scored by Mia Hamm, Julie Foudy, and Kristine Lilly. The following day at the Rose Bowl, North Korea lost 2–1 to Nigeria by conceding goals to Mercy Akide and Rita Nwadike in the second half.

The United States hosted Nigeria at Chicago's Soldier Field for their second match. They fell behind in the second minute by conceding a goal to Nkiru Okosieme after a defensive mistake. The Americans rallied and found an equalizer in the form of an own goal scored by Ifeanyi Chiejine in the 19th minute. This initiated a 23-minute period where the home side scored six goals on their way to a 7–1 victory. North Korea earned an upset victory over Denmark in Portland, winning 3–1 with two first-half goals and another in the 73rd minute before a consolation goal by the Danes. The North Korean victory denied the United States an instant berth in the quarter-finals. It also preserved the chances for all four teams in the group to finish in the top two places and qualify for the knockout stage.

Nigeria became the first African team to advance to the quarter-finals of a Women's World Cup with a 2–0 defeat of Denmark in their final group stage match. Nigeria's Super Falcons took the lead with a goal by Mercy Akide in the first half and added a second by Okosieme in the 81st minute, while Denmark had a goal disallowed and was unable to finish its chances. The United States rested several of its starting players for its final group stage match against North Korea, but finished with a 3–0 victory with a goal from reserve striker Shannon MacMillan and another two scored by midfielder Tisha Venturini in the second half. The Americans finished first in Group A, with nine points, followed by Nigeria with six.

June 19, 1999
15:00 EDT (UTC−4)

United States	3–0	Denmark
Hamm 17'; Foudy 73'; Lilly 89'	Report

Giants Stadium, East Rutherford
Attendance: 78,972
Referee: Sonia Denoncourt (Canada)
June 20, 1999
18:30 PDT (UTC−7)

North Korea	1–2	Nigeria
Jo Song-ok 74'	Report	Akide 50'; Nwadike 79'

Rose Bowl, Pasadena
Attendance: 17,100
Referee: Katriina Elovirta (Finland)

June 24, 1999
19:00 CDT (UTC−5)

United States	7–1	Nigeria
I. Chiejine 19' (o.g.); Hamm 20'; Milbrett 23', 83'; Lilly 32'; Akers 39'; Parlow 42'	Report	Okosieme 2'

Soldier Field, Chicago
Attendance: 65,080
Referee: Nicole Petignat (Switzerland)
June 24, 1999
18:00 PDT (UTC−7)

North Korea	3–1	Denmark
Jin Pyol-hui 15'; Jo Song-ok 39'; Kim Kum-sil 73'	Report	Johansen 74'

Civic Stadium, Portland
Attendance: 20,129
Referee: Martha Liliana Pardo (Colombia)

June 27, 1999
16:00 EDT (UTC−4)

Nigeria	2–0	Denmark
Akide 25'; Okosieme 81'	Report

Jack Kent Cooke Stadium, Landover
Attendance: 22,109
Referee: Maria Edilene Siqueira (Brazil)
June 27, 1999
19:00 EDT (UTC−4)

United States	3–0	North Korea
MacMillan 56'; Venturini 68', 76'	Report

Foxboro Stadium, Foxborough
Attendance: 50,484
Referee: Katriina Elovirta (Finland)

=== Group B ===
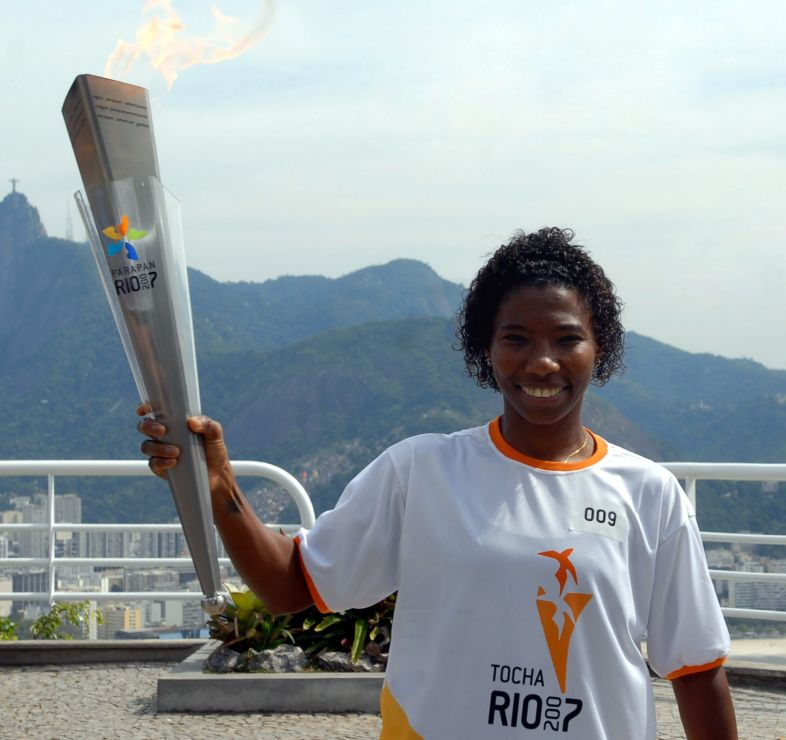
Pretinha scored a hat-trick in Brazil's opening match against Mexico

Pos	Team	Pld	W	D	L	GF	GA	GD	Pts	Qualification
1	Brazil	3	2	1	0	12	4	+8	7	Advance to knockout stage
2	Germany	3	1	2	0	10	4	+6	5	Advance to knockout stage
3	Italy	3	1	1	1	3	3	0	4	
4	Mexico	3	0	0	3	1	15	−14	0	

Source: FIFA

Group B, dubbed the tournament's "group of death", included 1995 runners-up Germany, Olympic semi-finalists Brazil, 1991 quarter-finalist Italy, and newcomers Mexico. Brazil opened the group stage with a 7–1 blowout win over Mexico at Giants Stadium, scoring the final six goals of the match after it was tied at 1–1 ten minutes in. Forward Pretinha and midfielder Sissi both scored hat-tricks, the former's completed in stoppage time and the latter in the 50th minute. Kátia scored from a penalty kick before half-time. Italy and Germany played to a 1–1 draw the following day at the Rose Bowl, avoiding an upset for the Italians with a penalty kick scored by Bettina Wiegmann in the 61st minute to level the match.

Sissi scored twice for Brazil in their second match, a 2–0 victory against Italy in Chicago, earning the team a quarter-finals berth. Mexico was eliminated from the group in a 6–0 loss to Germany in Portland, having been outshot 43–2 and unable to force a save from German goalkeeper Silke Rottenberg until the 89th minute. Inka Grings scored a hat-trick for the Germans, including the opening and closing goals of the match, while her teammates Sandra Smisek, Ariane Hingst, and Renate Lingor each scored one goal.

Brazil and Germany played on the final matchday for first place in Group B, as the second-place team would be drawn against the United States in the quarter-finals. After conceding to Germany's Birgit Prinz in the eighth minute, Brazil rallied from behind and took a 2–1 lead by the end of the first half on goals by Kátia and Sissi. A penalty kick, awarded to Germany in the first minute of the second half after Prinz was fouled in the box, was converted by Wiegmann to tie the match at 2–2. The Germans then took the lead on a deflected shot by Steffi Jones, but a last-minute header from substitute forward Maycon in stoppage time tied the match at 3–3. Brazil finished atop the group and would play Nigeria in the quarter-finals, while Germany advanced as the second-placed team to face the United States. Italy, who were already eliminated by the Brazil–Germany draw, defeated Mexico 2–0 at Foxboro Stadium to finish the tournament with a 1–1–1 record.

June 19, 1999
17:30 EDT (UTC−4)

Brazil	7–1	Mexico
Pretinha 3', 12', 90+1'; Sissi 29', 42', 50'; Kátia 35' (pen.)	Report	Domínguez 10'

Giants Stadium, East Rutherford
Attendance: 78,972
Referee: Nicole Petignat (Switzerland)
June 20, 1999
16:00 PDT (UTC−7)

Germany	1–1	Italy
Wiegmann 61' (pen.)	Report	Panico 36'

Rose Bowl, Pasadena
Attendance: 17,100
Referee: Bola Elizabeth Abidoye (Nigeria)

June 24, 1999
17:00 CDT (UTC−5)

Brazil	2–0	Italy
Sissi 3', 63'	Report

Soldier Field, Chicago
Attendance: 65,080
Referee: Gitte Nielsen (Denmark)
June 24, 1999
20:30 PDT (UTC−7)

Germany	6–0	Mexico
Grings 10', 57', 90+2'; Smisek 45+1'; Hingst 49'; Lingor 89'	Report

Civic Stadium, Portland
Attendance: 20,129
Referee: Im Eun-ju (South Korea)

June 27, 1999
13:30 EDT (UTC−4)

Germany	3–3	Brazil
Prinz 8'; Wiegmann 46' (pen.); Jones 58'	Report	Kátia 15'; Sissi 20'; Maycon 90+4'

Jack Kent Cooke Stadium, Landover
Attendance: 22,109
Referee: Im Eun-ju (South Korea)
June 27, 1999
16:30 EDT (UTC−4)

Mexico	0–2	Italy
	Report	Panico 37'; Zanni 51'

Foxboro Stadium, Foxborough
Attendance: 50,484
Referee: Bola Elizabeth Abidoye (Nigeria)

=== Group C ===
Pos	Team	Pld	W	D	L	GF	GA	GD	Pts	Qualification
1	Norway	3	3	0	0	13	2	+11	9	Advance to knockout stage
2	Russia	3	2	0	1	10	3	+7	6	Advance to knockout stage
3	Canada	3	0	1	2	3	12	−9	1	
4	Japan	3	0	1	2	1	10	−9	1	

Source: FIFA

Reigning World Cup champions Norway were seeded into Group C, which also had 1995 quarter-finalists Japan, North American qualification champions Canada, and newcomers Russia, who qualified through the European play-offs. Canada took the lead in the 32nd minute of its opening match against Japan, played at Spartan Stadium in San Jose, but conceded to Japanese forward Nami Otake in the 64th minute and ended the match with a 1–1 draw. Norway began its defense of the World Cup title in Massachusetts with a 2–1 win over the debuting Russians, with a goal by Brit Sandaune off a 28th-minute corner kick taken by Marianne Pettersen, who scored in the 68th minute and took nine more shots; Galina Komarova scored a consolation goal for Russia in the 78th minute, one of just two shots on goal for the team during the entire match.

At Jack Kent Cooke Stadium near Washington, D.C., Norway became the first team to secure a place in the quarter-finals by winning 7–1 in a rout of Canada. Canada had tied the match at 1–1 with a goal in the 31st minute by Charmaine Hooper, but Norwegian forward Ann Kristin Aarønes, who had scored the first goal in the eighth minute, restored her team's lead with a header in the 36th minute. Five Norwegian players scored in the second half, equaling the seven goals they scored against Canada in the first round of the 1995 tournament. Four days after their defeat to Norway, the Russians earned their first World Cup win by defeating Japan 5–0 at Portland's Civic Stadium. The team scored four goals in the second half, including two by Olga Letyushova and three throughout the match that were assisted by captain Irina Grigorieva.

Russia qualified for the quarter-finals with a 4–1 victory over Canada at Giants Stadium in New Jersey, finishing in second place with six points. Grigorieva scored Russia's first goal in the 54th minute and assisted on their second, the first of two goals scored by Elena Fomina; Canada had reduced the deficit to 2–1 with a goal by Charmaine Hooper in the 76th minute, but Fomina's second in the 86th minute and a stoppage time goal from Olga Karasseva finished off the match. Norway finished unbeaten in the group stage by defeating Japan 4–0 at Soldier Field on June 26, benefiting from an early penalty kick and an own goal that were both conceded by Hiromi Isozaki; Isozaki fouled Monica Knudsen in the box in the seventh minute, leading to a penalty converted by Hege Riise a minute later, and misplayed a cross by Unni Lehn into her own goal in the 26th minute. The Norwegian team lost captain Linda Medalen and forward Ann Kristin Aarønes to injuries in the first half, but not before the latter had scored the team's third goal. The final goal of the match was scored in the 61st minute by Dagny Mellgren, who headed in a cross produced by Lehn.

June 19, 1999
19:00 PDT (UTC−7)

Japan	1–1	Canada
Otake 64'	Report	Burtini 32'

Spartan Stadium, San Jose
Attendance: 23,298
Referee: Maria Edilene Siqueira (Brazil)
June 20, 1999
16:00 EDT (UTC−4)

Norway	2–1	Russia
Sandaune 28'; Pettersen 68'	Report	Komarova 78'

Foxboro Stadium, Foxborough
Attendance: 14,873
Referee: Zuo Xiudi (China PR)

June 23, 1999
18:00 EDT (UTC−4)

Norway	7–1	Canada
Aarønes 8', 36'; Lehn 49'; Riise 54'; Medalen 62'; Pettersen 76'; S. Gulbrandsen 87'	Report	Hooper 31'

Jack Kent Cooke Stadium, Landover
Attendance: 16,448
Referee: Tammy Ogston (Australia)
June 23, 1999
18:00 PDT (UTC−7)

Japan	0–5	Russia
	Report	Savina 29'; Letyushova 52', 90'; N. Karasseva 58'; Barbashina 80'

Civic Stadium, Portland
Attendance: 17,668
Referee: Sandra Hunt (United States)

June 26, 1999
12:00 EDT (UTC−4)

Canada	1–4	Russia
Hooper 76'	Report	Grigorieva 54'; Fomina 66', 86'; O. Karasseva 90+1'

Giants Stadium, East Rutherford
Attendance: 29,401
Referee: Zuo Xiudi (China PR)
June 26, 1999
18:30 CDT (UTC−5)

Norway	4–0	Japan
Riise 8' (pen.); Isozaki 26' (o.g.); Aarønes 36'; Mellgren 61'	Report

Soldier Field, Chicago
Attendance: 34,256
Referee: Marisela Contreras (Venezuela)

=== Group D ===
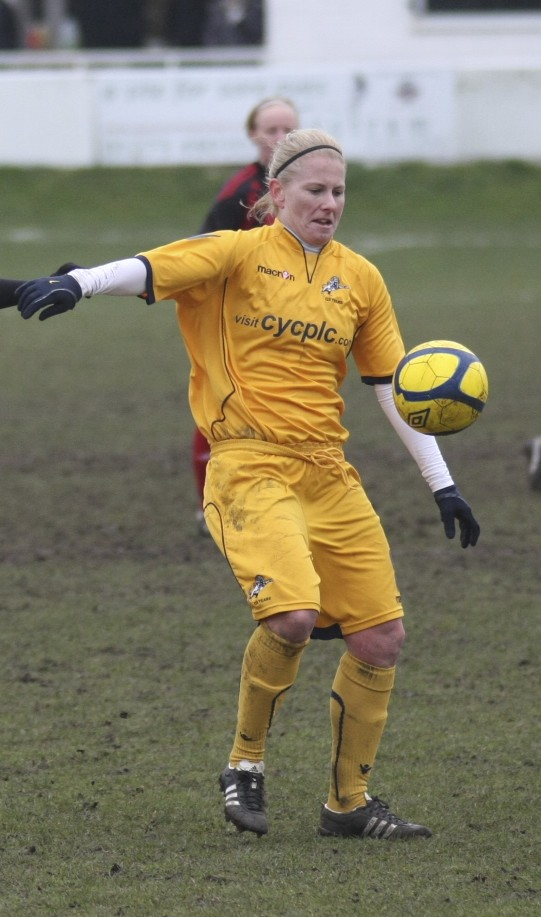
Alicia Ferguson was sent off with a red card in the second minute of Australia's match against China, the fastest in tournament history

Pos	Team	Pld	W	D	L	GF	GA	GD	Pts	Qualification
1	China	3	3	0	0	12	2	+10	9	Advance to knockout stage
2	Sweden	3	2	0	1	6	3	+3	6	Advance to knockout stage
3	Australia	3	0	1	2	3	7	−4	1	
4	Ghana	3	0	1	2	1	10	−9	1	

Source: FIFA

Group D included 1995 semi-finalists and Olympic runners-up China, 1995's last-place team Australia, newcomers and African tournament runners-up Ghana, and previous hosts and semi-finalists Sweden. In their opening match against Sweden at Spartan Stadium in San Jose, China conceded an early goal in the second minute to Swedish defender Kristin Bengtsson. Forward Jin Yan scored the equalizer for China in the 17th minute and Liu Ailing scored the winning goal in the 69th minute. Australia and Ghana played to a 1–1 draw at Foxboro Stadium in the group's other opening match a day later, which began with a red card shown to Ghanaian midfielder Barikisu Tettey-Quao in the 25th minute. Ghanaian goalkeeper Memunatu Sulemana made 11 saves to keep the match scoreless until the 74th minute, when Matildas captain Julie Murray scored to break the deadlock. Ghana equalized less than two minutes later with a finish by substitute Nana Gyamfuah following a rebound off Australian goalkeeper Tracey Wheeler's save, securing a point in the group standings.

Sweden took an early lead in its second match, played against Australia at Jack Kent Cooke Stadium near Washington, D.C., with a header in the eighth minute by Jane Törnqvist off a corner kick and a tap-in goal by Hanna Ljungberg twelve minutes later. Julie Murray's goal in the 32nd minute reduced the deficit to 2–1 at half-time, but Ljungberg scored again in the 69th minute because of a defensive error by Australia, confirming a 3–1 victory for the Swedes. Sun Wen completed a hat-trick in the first 54 minutes of China's match against Ghana, which ended in a 7–0 victory at Portland's Civic Stadium and clinched the team's quarter-finals berth. Ghana lost defender Regina Ansah to a red card in the 52nd minute and three of her teammates earned three yellow cards for other fouls. The Chinese continued to score in the second half, including a pair by Zhang Ouying in the 82nd minute and at the beginning of stoppage time, while Zhao Lihong added another stoppage time goal a minute later.

China closed out its group stage by defeating Australia 3–1, extending its winning streak to three matches and outscoring its opponents 12–2. Australian forward Alicia Ferguson was sent off for a foul in the second minute, which remains the fastest red card in Women's World Cup history. Sun Wen scored her first goal in the 39th minute and followed with a second shortly after half-time, having received passes from Zhao Lihong for both goals. Cheryl Salisbury reduced the deficit to 2–1 with her strike in the 66th minute, ending a 253-minute shutout streak for Chinese goalkeeper Gao Hong. The Chinese ultimately won 3–1 after an assurance goal was scored by Liu Ying in the 73rd minute. Sweden advanced to the quarter-finals with a 2–0 victory over Ghana in Chicago, relying on two goals scored by early substitute Victoria Svensson in the 58th and 86th minutes.

June 19, 1999
17:00 PDT (UTC−7)

China	2–1	Sweden
Jin Yan 17'; Liu Ailing 69'	Report	Bengtsson 2'

Spartan Stadium, San Jose
Attendance: 23,298
Referee: Virginia Tovar (Mexico)
June 20, 1999
19:30 EDT (UTC−4)

Australia	1–1	Ghana
Murray 74'	Report	Gyamfuah 76'

Foxboro Stadium, Foxborough
Attendance: 14,873
Referee: Kari Seitz (United States)

June 23, 1999
20:30 EDT (UTC−4)

Australia	1–3	Sweden
Murray 32'	Report	Törnqvist 8'; Ljungberg 21', 69'

Jack Kent Cooke Stadium, Landover
Attendance: 16,448
Referee: Fatou Gaye (Senegal)
June 23, 1999
20:30 PDT (UTC−7)

China	7–0	Ghana
Sun Wen 9', 21', 54'; Jin Yan 16'; Zhang Ouying 82', 90+1'; Zhao Lihong 90+2'	Report

Civic Stadium, Portland
Attendance: 17,668
Referee: Elke Günthner (Germany)

June 26, 1999
14:30 EDT (UTC−4)

China	3–1	Australia
Sun Wen 39', 51'; Liu Ying 73'	Report	Salisbury 66'

Giants Stadium, East Rutherford
Attendance: 29,401
Referee: Sandra Hunt (United States)
June 26, 1999
16:00 CDT (UTC−5)

Ghana	0–2	Sweden
	Report	Svensson 58', 86'

Soldier Field, Chicago
Attendance: 34,256
Referee: Sonia Denoncourt (Canada)

== Knockout stage ==
The knockout stage of the Women's World Cup consisted of three single-elimination rounds leading to a final and a third-place playoff. Following a tie in regulation time, two 15-minute periods of extra time would be used to determine a winner. For the first time in Women's World Cup history, the golden goal would be used during extra time to instantly decide the winner in sudden death. If the score remained tied at the end of extra time, a penalty shootout would ensue.

=== Bracket ===
Quarterfinals
July 1 – Landover
United States	3
Germany	2
July 1 – Landover
Brazil (g.g.)	4
Nigeria	3
June 30 – San Jose
Norway	3
Sweden	1
June 30 – San Jose
China	2
Russia	0

Semifinals
July 4 – Stanford
United States	2
Brazil	0
July 4 – Foxborough
Norway	0
China	5

Final
July 10 – Pasadena
United States (p)	0 (5)
China	0 (4)
Third place playoff
July 10 – Pasadena
Brazil (p)	0 (5)
Norway	0 (4)

=== Quarterfinals ===
The first match of a quarterfinals doubleheader at Spartan Stadium in San Jose featured China and Russia, the only team to debut at the tournament and also advance to the knockout stage. China advanced with a 2–0 victory over Russia, with goals by Pu Wei and Jin Yan, while their opponents did not manage a shot towards goal until stoppage time. The second match of the doubleheader, between neighboring rivals Norway and Sweden, began with a scoreless first half and ended with four goals scored in the second half for a 3–1 Norwegian win. Norway opened the scoring with a header by Ann Kristin Aarønes in the 51st minute, which was followed by a goal from Marianne Pettersen in the 58th minute and a penalty scored by Hege Riise in the 72nd minute; Sweden scored a consolation goal by way of a run and shot from Malin Moström in the 90th minute.

The next doubleheader, at Jack Kent Cooke Stadium near Washington, D.C., began with a match between the United States and Germany played in front of 54,642, including U.S. President Bill Clinton, First Lady Hillary Clinton, and Chelsea Clinton. U.S. defender Brandi Chastain scored an own goal in the fifth minute after a miscommunication with goalkeeper Briana Scurry, but the Americans found an equalizing goal eleven minutes later from Tiffeny Milbrett. Germany retook the lead in first-half stoppage time on a strike by Bettina Wiegmann that beat Scurry from 22 yards (20 m). Chastain redeemed herself by scoring the second equalizing goal for the U.S. in the 49th minute, finishing a corner kick that was taken by Mia Hamm. Defender Joy Fawcett's header off a corner kick in the 66th minute proved to be the game-winning goal, allowing the United States to advance with a 3–2 defeat of the Germans.

The second match at Jack Kent Cooke Stadium, featuring Brazil and Nigeria, was the first in FIFA Women's World Cup history to be decided by a golden goal in extra time. Cidinha scored twice in the first 22 minutes of the match and was joined by Nenê in the 35th minute to give Brazil a 3–0 lead at half-time. Nigeria substituted goalkeeper Ann Chiejine for Judith Chime and began pressing its attackers early in the second half. The Super Falcons scored their first goal in the 63rd minute, Prisca Emeafu taking advantage of a defensive mistake, and added a second through Nkiru Okosieme's shot off a rebound in the 72nd minute. Nkechi Egbe scored the equalizing goal for Nigeria in the 85th minute with a far-post strike from 14 yards (13 m). The goal forced sudden death extra time, which Nigeria would play with only 10 players after forward Patience Avre was ejected in the 87th minute for receiving a second yellow card. Brazilian midfielder Sissi, who had assisted two of the first-half goals, scored the golden goal from 22 yards (20 m) in the 104th minute to win the match 4–3 for Brazil.

The top seven quarterfinalists also qualified for the 2000 Summer Olympics alongside hosts Australia, who were eliminated in the group stage. The Olympics qualification was determined by a series of tiebreakers, beginning with the margin of defeat in the quarterfinal match, followed by goals scored in the quarterfinal and group stage performance. Although Russia and Sweden both lost by two goals, the Swedes had scored in their defeat while Russia did not, leaving them as the only quarterfinalist to not qualify for the Olympics.

June 30, 1999
17:00 PDT (UTC−7)

China	2–0	Russia
Pu Wei 37'; Jin Yan 56'	Report

Spartan Stadium, San Jose
Attendance: 21,411
Referee: Nicole Petignat (Switzerland)

June 30, 1999
19:30 PDT (UTC−7)

Norway	3–1	Sweden
Aarønes 51'; Pettersen 58'; Riise 72' (pen.)	Report	Moström 90+1'

Spartan Stadium, San Jose
Attendance: 21,411
Referee: Im Eun-ju (South Korea)

July 1, 1999
19:00 EDT (UTC−4)

United States	3–2	Germany
Milbrett 16'; Chastain 49'; Fawcett 66'	Report	Chastain 5' (o.g.); Wiegmann 45+1'

Jack Kent Cooke Stadium, Landover
Attendance: 54,642
Referee: Martha Liliana Pardo (Colombia)

July 1, 1999
21:30 EDT (UTC−4)

Brazil	4–3 (a.e.t./g.g.)	Nigeria
Cidinha 4', 22'; Nenê 35'; Sissi 104'	Report	Emeafu 63'; Okosieme 72'; Egbe 85'

Jack Kent Cooke Stadium, Landover
Attendance: 54,642
Referee: Virginia Tovar (Mexico)

=== Semifinals ===
The semifinals played on U.S. Independence Day were organized as doubleheaders with the host Major League Soccer teams, the New England Revolution and the San Jose Clash. Both teams played regular season matches afterwards against the MetroStars and D.C. United, respectively. The United States faced Brazil at Stanford Stadium in the San Francisco Bay Area in front of 73,123 spectators. The U.S. began the match with an early lead, following a mistimed catch from Brazilian goalkeeper Maravilha that allowed Cindy Parlow to score from a header in the fifth minute. Brazil responded with several shots in the second half that required goalkeeper Briana Scurry to make three major saves to preserve the lead. On a counterattack in the 80th minute, U.S. striker Mia Hamm drew a penalty kick on a foul from Brazilian captain Elane. Veteran midfielder Michelle Akers, who had stayed on despite two serious head collisions, converted the penalty kick to give the United States a 2–0 victory.

In the second semifinal, played before 28,986 attendees at Foxboro Stadium in Massachusetts, China defeated reigning champions Norway in a 5–0 rout that matched the team's worst-ever margin of defeat. Sun Wen opened the scoring in the third minute, with a rebounded shot off a save by goalkeeper Bente Nordby. This was followed by a right-footed volley by Liu Ailing eleven minutes later off a corner kick, increasing the team's lead to 2–0. Liu scored her second goal in the 51st minute, hitting a left-footed volley from 15 yards (14 m), and Fan Yunjie scored China's fourth goal in the 65th minute with another volley off a free kick taken by Sun. China was awarded a penalty kick in the 72nd minute for a handball in the Norwegian box. Sun converted it, scoring her seventh goal of the tournament to tie Sissi as the leading goalscorer.

July 4, 1999
13:30 PDT (UTC−7)

United States	2–0	Brazil
Parlow 5'; Akers 80' (pen.)	Report

Stanford Stadium, Stanford
Attendance: 73,123
Referee: Katriina Elovirta (Finland)

July 4, 1999
19:30 EDT (UTC−4)

Norway	0–5	China
	Report	Sun Wen 3', 72' (pen.); Liu Ailing 14', 51'; Fan Yunjie 65'

Foxboro Stadium, Foxborough
Attendance: 28,986
Referee: Sonia Denoncourt (Canada)

=== Third place playoff ===
The third-place playoff, contested by Norway and Brazil, was the first part of a doubleheader with the final at the Rose Bowl in Pasadena kicking off in the morning. Norway had the majority of chances to score during the match, but Maravilha saved all of their shots to preserve her shutout. Pretinha had two chances to score for Brazil and take the lead, but they were denied by Norwegian goalkeeper Bente Nordby late in the second half. After remaining scoreless through regulation time and stoppage time, the match advanced straight into a penalty shootout; the standard golden goal extra time was skipped due to the constraints of television scheduling ahead of the final. Pretinha missed the opening penalty for Brazil, but the remaining five taken by her teammates were all converted; Norway lost its lead in the shootout with a miss in the third round by Silje Jørgensen, and the shootout ended 5–4 in Brazil's favor after the sixth round following a miss by Ann Kristin Aarønes and a successful shot by Formiga.

July 10, 1999
10:15 PDT (UTC−7)

Brazil	0–0 (a.e.t.)	Norway
	Report
Penalties
Pretinha (penalty missed); Cidinha (penalty scored); Kátia (penalty scored); Maycon (penalty scored); Nenê (penalty scored); Formiga (penalty scored)	5–4	(penalty scored) Riise; (penalty scored) Pettersen; (penalty missed) Jørgensen; (penalty scored) Sandaune; (penalty scored) S. Gulbrandsen; (penalty missed) Aarønes

Rose Bowl, Pasadena
Attendance: 90,185
Referee: Im Eun-ju (South Korea)

=== Final ===
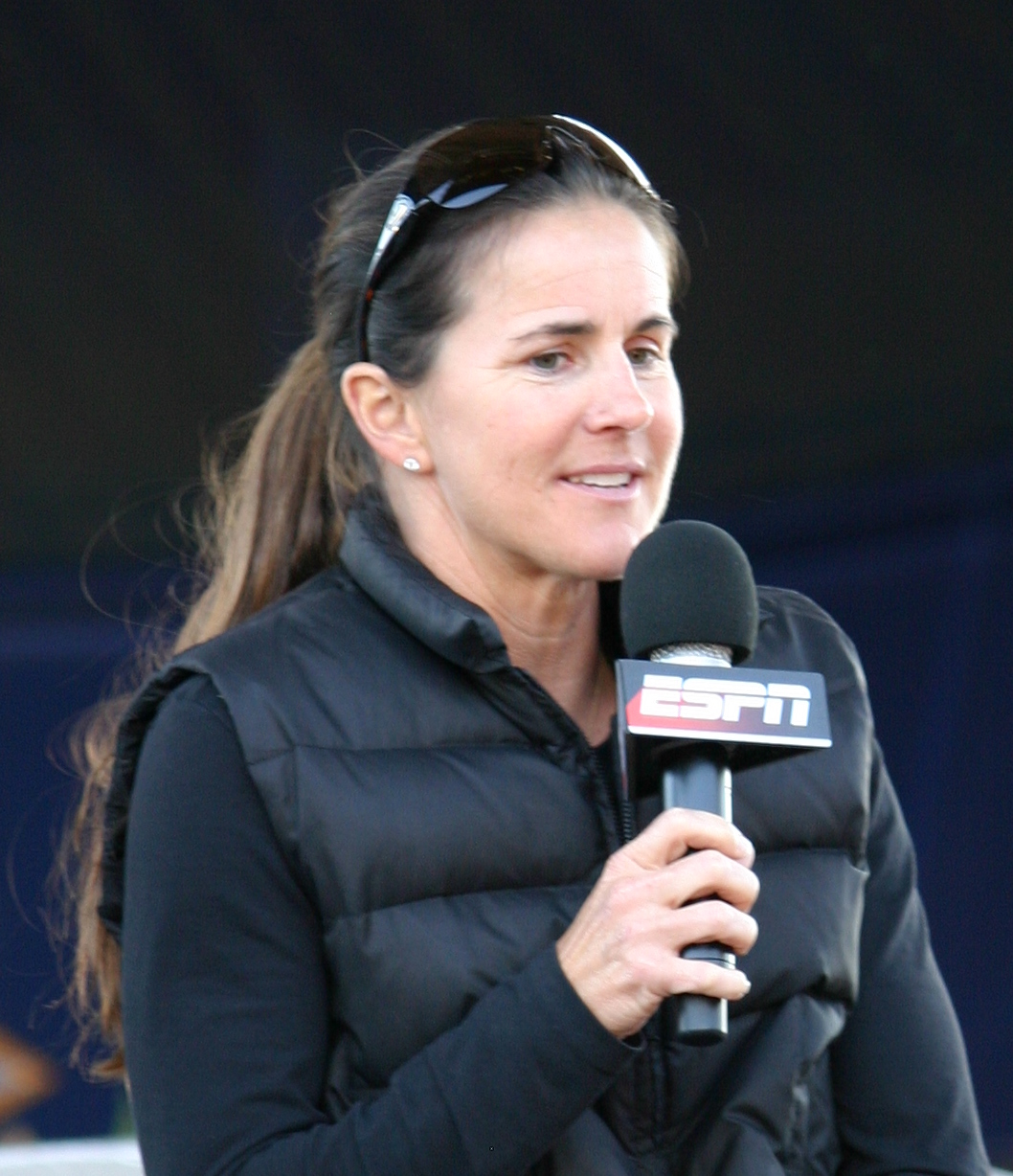
U.S. defender Brandi Chastain scored the winning penalty in the final

The 1999 final at the Rose Bowl was played in front of 90,185 spectators, claimed to be a world record for a women's sports event, while its U.S. television broadcast averaged 17.9 million viewers and peaked at 40 million. The two finalists, the United States and China, had previously met in the gold medal match at the 1996 Summer Olympics in Atlanta, which the U.S. won 2–1. With several unsuccessful attempts at the goal made by the hosts, the match was scoreless after regulation time and moved into extra time. China shot twice towards the U.S. goal in extra time, but saves by midfielder Kristine Lilly and goalkeeper Briana Scurry preserved the tie until the end of extra time.

In the ensuing penalty shootout, the first four players scored on their shots before Liu Ying had her attempt in the third round saved by Scurry. Scurry was accused of cheating by multiple media outlets because she had intentionally stepped ahead of the goal line before saving Liu's shot, but stated that "everybody does it". Lilly and Mia Hamm successfully converted their penalties and gave the Americans a lead, but Zhang Ouying and Sun Wen were able to convert theirs and keep it tied 4–4. Brandi Chastain, who had missed a penalty kick in the Algarve Cup against the Chinese months earlier, beat goalkeeper Gao Hong and won the shootout 5–4 for the United States. Chastain celebrated by removing her jersey and revealing her sports bra underneath, creating one of the most iconic moments in women's sports history as it appeared on the covers of major magazines and newspapers.

July 10, 1999
12:50 PDT (UTC−7)

United States	0–0 (a.e.t.)	China
	Report
Penalties
Overbeck (penalty scored); Fawcett (penalty scored); Lilly (penalty scored); Hamm (penalty scored); Chastain (penalty scored)	5–4	(penalty scored) Xie Huilin; (penalty scored) Qiu Haiyan; (penalty missed) Liu Ying; (penalty scored) Zhang Ouying; (penalty scored) Sun Wen

Rose Bowl, Pasadena
Attendance: 90,185
Referee: Nicole Petignat (Switzerland)

== Aftermath and legacy ==
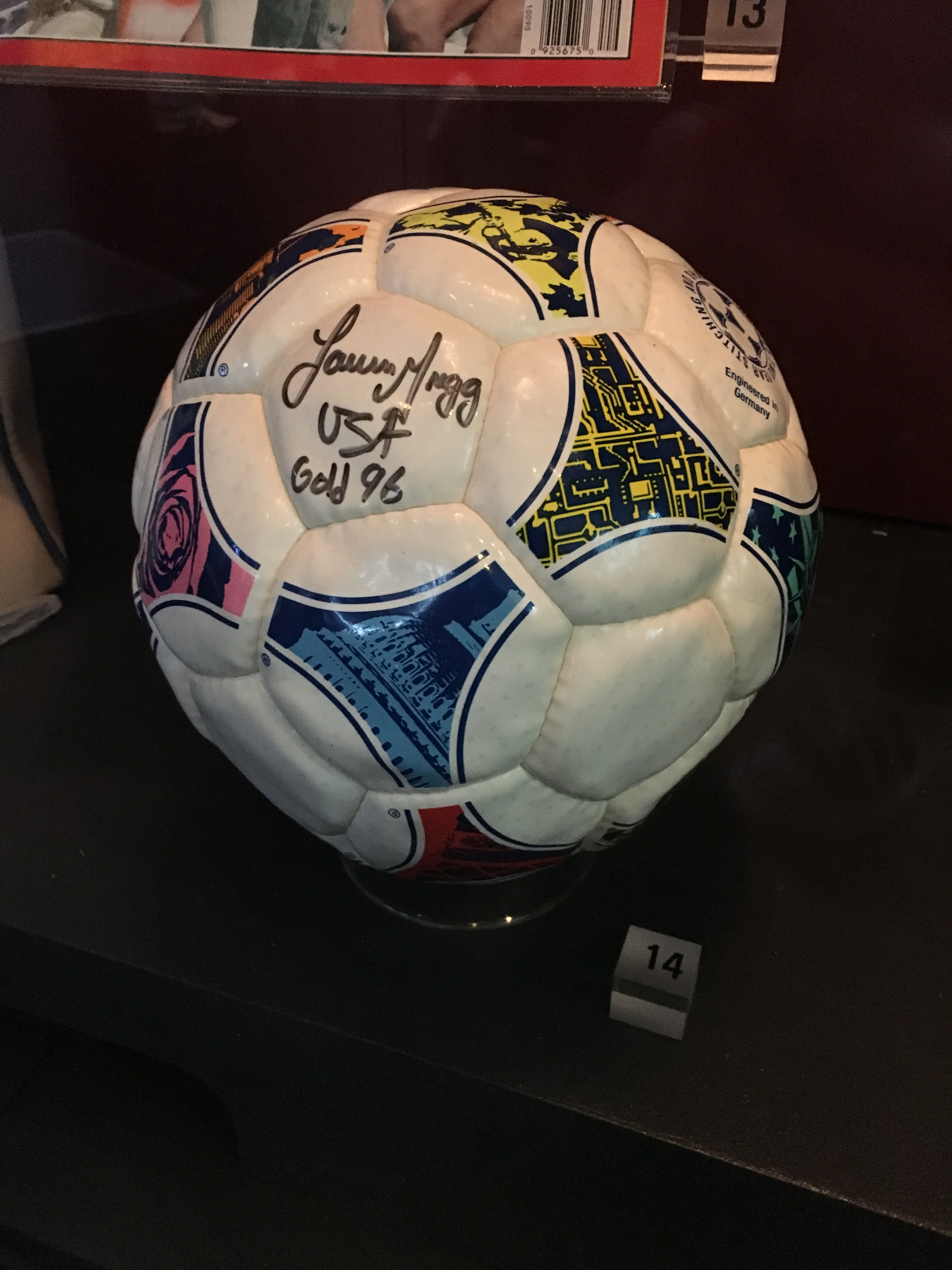
A match ball signed by the U.S. team on display in the National Football Museum in England.

The 1999 Women's World Cup is regarded as a watershed moment in the history of U.S. women's soccer because of its cultural impact and the great public interest it generated. It had a total attendance of 1.194 million spectators and averaged 37,319 per match. This remained the highest total attendance for any Women's World Cup until 2015, which had more matches. The tournament's merchandise sales and television ratings were especially high in the U.S., including several matches that set record for ESPN and ESPN2. The final held the record for the largest domestic television audience for a soccer match until the 2014 men's World Cup. The organizing committee reported an estimated profit of $4 million on its $30 million operating budget, making the tournament a financial success.

The United States became the first team to win two Women's World Cups as well as the first to simultaneously hold the World Cup and Olympic titles. The team, nicknamed the "99ers" and regarded as the best to have been produced by the U.S. women's soccer program, became instant celebrities and appeared on late-night talk shows and news programs. The team went on a months-long victory tour following the final, which was originally self-organized due to a pay dispute with the United States Soccer Federation. They appeared in national advertising campaigns for several major companies. Although the team finished as silver medalists at the 2000 Summer Olympics behind Norway, the U.S. team would go on to win gold medals at the three subsequent Olympics. The United States finished third at the next two editions of the Women's World Cup and as runners-up to Japan in 2011 before winning their third World Cup title in 2015 and fourth in 2019. Several members of the 2011, 2015, and 2019 teams cited the 1999 tournament as providing inspiration during their pursuit of a professional career in the sport. Christie Rampone was the last member of the 1999 team to retire, doing so in 2017 after earning 311 caps.

The organizers and supporters of the Women's World Cup had hoped to ride the momentum from the tournament's popularity to form a professional women's soccer league akin to Major League Soccer, which was established after the 1994 men's World Cup. The Women's United Soccer Association (WUSA) was formed in January 2000 and began play in April 2001 with eight teams and the support of the United States Soccer Federation. The league's $40 million, five-year budget lasted only one season while its attendance and television ratings struggled to meet projections and investor demands. The league played three full seasons before folding in September 2003 with losses estimated at $90 million and an average attendance of 6,667 in its final season. The league's teams continued playing in exhibition matches, but eventually folded, while another professional league was founded in 2007 and folded after three seasons. The National Women's Soccer League was established in 2012 and is the longest-running women's soccer league in U.S. history, drawing on greater financial and planning support from the United States Soccer Federation.

China was originally awarded the rights to host the 2003 tournament, but the SARS outbreak forced them to withdraw as hosts. The United States stepped in to host the tournament, which was organized in three months and was used unsuccessfully to prevent the WUSA from folding. The 2003 tournament used smaller venues, including several soccer-specific stadiums built for Major League Soccer teams, and its television broadcasts competed against American football and baseball games that were scheduled at the same time. It averaged an attendance of 20,525 and ended with a victory for Germany over Sweden at the Home Depot Center in Carson, California.

== Awards ==
Chinese striker Sun Wen was awarded the Golden Ball as the tournament's best player. She also shared the Golden Shoe with Brazilian midfielder Sissi as the tournament's joint top goalscorers with seven goals and three assists for both players. Sissi also won the Silver Ball, while American veteran Michelle Akers won the Bronze Ball. Ann Kristin Aarønes won the Bronze Shoe with four goals and one assist. China won the FIFA Fair Play Award for its disciplinary record during the tournament. The tournament's awards were presented at the FIFA World Player of the Year ceremony on January 24, 2000, in Brussels.

Golden Ball	Silver Ball	Bronze Ball
(China) Sun Wen	(Brazil) Sissi	(United States) Michelle Akers
Golden Shoe		Bronze Shoe
(Brazil) Sissi	(China) Sun Wen	(Norway) Ann Kristin Aarønes
7 goals, 3 assists		4 goals, 1 assist
FIFA Fair Play Award
China

=== All-Star Team ===
The sixteen members of the Women's World Cup All-Star Team were announced on July 8, 1999, including seven players from China and five from the United States. It was the first all-star team to be chosen during the World Cup by FIFA officials.

Goalkeepers	Defenders	Midfielders	Forwards
(China) Gao Hong (United States) Briana Scurry	(China) Wang Liping (China) Wen Lirong (Germany) Doris Fitschen (United States) Brandi Chastain (United States) Carla Overbeck	(Brazil) Sissi (China) Liu Ailing (China) Zhao Lihong (Germany) Bettina Wiegmann (United States) Michelle Akers	(China) Jin Yan (China) Sun Wen (Norway) Ann Kristin Aarønes (United States) Mia Hamm

== Statistics ==
=== Goalscorers ===
A total of 123 goals were scored at the Women's World Cup, setting a new tournament record, and averaged 3.84 per match. 74 different players scored goals, including three own goals and four hat-tricks. Sissi of Brazil and Sun Wen of China PR won the Golden Shoe award for scoring seven goals, while Ann Kristin Aarønes of Norway finished third with four goals.

7 goals

- (Brazil) Sissi
- (China) Sun Wen

4 goals

- (Norway) Ann Kristin Aarønes

3 goals

- (Brazil) Pretinha
- (China) Jin Yan
- (China) Liu Ailing
- (Germany) Inka Grings
- (Germany) Bettina Wiegmann
- (Nigeria) Nkiru Okosieme
- (Norway) Marianne Pettersen
- (Norway) Hege Riise
- (United States) Tiffeny Milbrett

2 goals

- (Australia) Julie Murray
- (Brazil) Cidinha
- (Brazil) Kátia
- (Canada) Charmaine Hooper
- (China) Zhang Ouying
- (Italy) Patrizia Panico
- (Nigeria) Mercy Akide
- (North Korea) Jo Song-ok
- (Russia) Elena Fomina
- (Russia) Olga Letyushova
- (Sweden) Hanna Ljungberg
- (Sweden) Victoria Svensson
- (United States) Michelle Akers
- (United States) Mia Hamm
- (United States) Kristine Lilly
- (United States) Cindy Parlow
- (United States) Tisha Venturini

1 goal

- (Australia) Cheryl Salisbury
- (Brazil) Maycon
- (Brazil) Nenê
- (Canada) Silvana Burtini
- (China) Fan Yunjie
- (China) Liu Ying
- (China) Pu Wei
- (China) Zhao Lihong
- (Denmark) Janni Johansen
- (Germany) Ariane Hingst
- (Germany) Steffi Jones
- (Germany) Renate Lingor
- (Germany) Birgit Prinz
- (Germany) Sandra Smisek
- (Ghana) Nana Gyamfuah
- (Italy) Paola Zanni
- (Japan) Nami Otake
- (Mexico) Maribel Domínguez
- (Nigeria) Nkechi Egbe
- (Nigeria) Prisca Emeafu
- (Nigeria) Rita Nwadike
- (North Korea) Jin Pyol-hui
- (North Korea) Kim Kum-sil
- (Norway) Solveig Gulbrandsen
- (Norway) Unni Lehn
- (Norway) Linda Medalen
- (Norway) Dagny Mellgren
- (Norway) Brit Sandaune
- (Russia) Natalia Barbashina
- (Russia) Irina Grigorieva
- (Russia) Natalia Karasseva
- (Russia) Olga Karasseva
- (Russia) Galina Komarova
- (Russia) Larisa Savina
- (Sweden) Kristin Bengtsson
- (Sweden) Malin Moström
- (Sweden) Jane Törnqvist
- (United States) Brandi Chastain
- (United States) Joy Fawcett
- (United States) Julie Foudy
- (United States) Shannon MacMillan

1 own goal

- (Japan) Hiromi Isozaki (against Norway)
- (Nigeria) Ifeanyi Chiejine (against United States)
- (United States) Brandi Chastain (against Germany)

Source: FIFA

=== Assists ===
4 assists

- (Russia) Irina Grigorieva
- (United States) Julie Foudy

3 assists

- (Brazil) Sissi
- (China) Sun Wen
- (Norway) Unni Lehn
- (Russia) Olga Letyushova
- (United States) Shannon MacMillan

2 assists

- (Brazil) Nenê
- (China) Pu Wei
- (China) Zhao Lihong
- (Germany) Sandra Smisek
- (Norway) Marianne Pettersen
- (United States) Brandi Chastain
- (United States) Mia Hamm
- (United States) Tiffeny Milbrett
- (United States) Cindy Parlow

1 assist

- (Australia) Julie Murray
- (Brazil) Elane
- (Brazil) Raquel
- (Canada) Geri Donnelly
- (Canada) Charmaine Hooper
- (Canada) Andrea Neil
- (Canada) Sharolta Nonen
- (China) Jin Yan
- (China) Liu Ying
- (China) Wang Liping
- (Germany) Doris Fitschen
- (Germany) Maren Meinert
- (Germany) Birgit Prinz
- (Germany) Pia Wunderlich
- (Ghana) Vivian Mensah
- (Italy) Antonella Carta
- (Japan) Tamaki Uchiyama
- (Nigeria) Mercy Akide
- (Nigeria) Patience Avre
- (Nigeria) Rita Nwadike
- (North Korea) Jo Jong-ran
- (North Korea) Jo Song-ok
- (Norway) Ann Kristin Aarønes
- (Norway) Silje Jørgensen
- (Norway) Monica Knudsen
- (Norway) Brit Sandaune
- (Russia) Natalia Barbashina
- (Russia) Natalia Karasseva
- (Sweden) Malin Andersson
- (Sweden) Kristin Bengtsson
- (Sweden) Malin Moström
- (Sweden) Victoria Svensson
- (United States) Joy Fawcett
- (United States) Kristine Lilly

Source: FIFA

=== Tournament ranking ===
Per statistical convention in soccer, matches decided in extra time are counted as wins and losses, while matches decided by penalty shoot-outs are counted as draws.

Pos	Grp	Team	Pld	W	D	L	GF	GA	GD	Pts	Final result
1	A	United States (H)	6	5	1	0	18	3	+15	16	Champions
2	D	China	6	5	1	0	19	2	+17	16	Runners-up
3	B	Brazil	6	3	2	1	16	9	+7	11	Third place
4	C	Norway	6	4	1	1	16	8	+8	13	Fourth place
5	C	Russia	4	2	0	2	10	5	+5	6	Eliminated in quarter-finals
6	D	Sweden	4	2	0	2	7	6	+1	6	Eliminated in quarter-finals
7	A	Nigeria	4	2	0	2	8	12	−4	6	Eliminated in quarter-finals
8	B	Germany	4	1	2	1	12	7	+5	5	Eliminated in quarter-finals
9	B	Italy	3	1	1	1	3	3	0	4	Eliminated in group stage
10	A	North Korea	3	1	0	2	4	6	−2	3	Eliminated in group stage
11	D	Australia	3	0	1	2	3	7	−4	1	Eliminated in group stage
12	C	Canada	3	0	1	2	3	12	−9	1	Eliminated in group stage
13	D	Ghana	3	0	1	2	1	10	−9	1	Eliminated in group stage
13	C	Japan	3	0	1	2	1	10	−9	1	Eliminated in group stage
15	A	Denmark	3	0	0	3	1	8	−7	0	Eliminated in group stage
16	B	Mexico	3	0	0	3	1	15	−14	0	Eliminated in group stage

Source: FIFA Technical Report
(H) Hosts
