= 1999 FIFA Women's World Cup Group A =

Football tournament group stage

Group A of the 1999 FIFA Women's World Cup took place from June 19 to 27, 1999. The group consisted of Denmark, Nigeria, North Korea and the hosts United States.

Three of these teams were also drawn together in Group A of the next World Cup in 2003 (the exception was Denmark, whose place was taken by fellow Scandinavians Sweden).

== Standings ==
Pos	Team	Pld	W	D	L	GF	GA	GD	Pts	Qualification
1	United States (H)	3	3	0	0	13	1	+12	9	Advance to knockout stage
2	Nigeria	3	2	0	1	5	8	−3	6	Advance to knockout stage
3	North Korea	3	1	0	2	4	6	−2	3	
4	Denmark	3	0	0	3	1	8	−7	0	

Source: FIFA
Rules for classification: Group stage tiebreakers
(H) Hosts

== Matches ==
All times listed are local time.

=== United States vs Denmark ===
June 19, 1999
15:00 EDT (UTC−4)

United States	3–0	Denmark
Hamm 17'; Foudy 73'; Lilly 89'	Report

Giants Stadium, East Rutherford
Attendance: 78,972
Referee: Sonia Denoncourt (Canada)

=== North Korea vs Nigeria ===
June 20, 1999
18:30 PDT (UTC−7)

North Korea	1–2	Nigeria
Jo Song-ok 74'	Report	Akide 50'; Nwadike 79'

Rose Bowl, Pasadena
Attendance: 17,100
Referee: Katriina Elovirta (Finland)

=== United States vs Nigeria ===
June 24, 1999
19:00 CDT (UTC−5)

United States	7–1	Nigeria
I. Chiejine 19' (o.g.); Hamm 20'; Milbrett 23', 83'; Lilly 32'; Akers 39'; Parlow 42'	Report	Okosieme 2'

Soldier Field, Chicago
Attendance: 65,080
Referee: Nicole Petignat (Switzerland)

=== North Korea vs Denmark ===
June 24, 1999
18:00 PDT (UTC−7)

North Korea	3–1	Denmark
Jin Pyol-hui 15'; Jo Song-ok 39'; Kim Kum-sil 73'	Report	Johansen 74'

Civic Stadium, Portland
Attendance: 20,129
Referee: Martha Liliana Pardo (Colombia)

=== Nigeria vs Denmark ===
June 27, 1999
16:00 EDT (UTC−4)

Nigeria	2–0	Denmark
Akide 25'; Okosieme 81'	Report

Jack Kent Cooke Stadium, Landover
Attendance: 22,109
Referee: Maria Edilene Siqueira (Brazil)

=== United States vs North Korea ===
June 27, 1999
19:00 EDT (UTC−4)

United States	3–0	North Korea
MacMillan 56'; Venturini 68', 76'	Report

Foxboro Stadium, Foxborough
Attendance: 50,484
Referee: Katriina Elovirta (Finland)

== See also ==
- Denmark at the FIFA Women's World Cup
- Nigeria at the FIFA Women's World Cup
- North Korea at the FIFA Women's World Cup
- United States at the FIFA Women's World Cup
