= 1999 FIFA Women's World Cup Group B =

Football tournament group stage

Group B of the 1999 FIFA Women's World Cup took place from June 19 to 27, 1999. The group consisted of Brazil, Germany, Italy and Mexico.

== Standings ==
Pos	Team	Pld	W	D	L	GF	GA	GD	Pts	Qualification
1	Brazil	3	2	1	0	12	4	+8	7	Advance to knockout stage
2	Germany	3	1	2	0	10	4	+6	5	Advance to knockout stage
3	Italy	3	1	1	1	3	3	0	4	
4	Mexico	3	0	0	3	1	15	−14	0	

Source: FIFA
Rules for classification: Group stage tiebreakers

== Matches ==
All times listed are local time.

=== Brazil vs Mexico ===
June 19, 1999
17:30 EDT (UTC−4)

Brazil	7–1	Mexico
Pretinha 3', 12', 90+1'; Sissi 29', 42', 50'; Kátia 35' (pen.)	Report	Domínguez 10'

Giants Stadium, East Rutherford
Attendance: 78,972
Referee: Nicole Petignat (Switzerland)

=== Germany vs Italy ===
June 20, 1999
16:00 PDT (UTC−7)

Germany	1–1	Italy
Wiegmann 61' (pen.)	Report	Panico 36'

Rose Bowl, Pasadena
Attendance: 17,100
Referee: Bola Elizabeth Abidoye (Nigeria)

=== Brazil vs Italy ===
June 24, 1999
17:00 CDT (UTC−5)

Brazil	2–0	Italy
Sissi 3', 63'	Report

Soldier Field, Chicago
Attendance: 65,080
Referee: Gitte Nielsen (Denmark)

=== Germany vs Mexico ===
June 24, 1999
20:30 PDT (UTC−7)

Germany	6–0	Mexico
Grings 10', 57', 90+2'; Smisek 45+1'; Hingst 49'; Lingor 89'	Report

Civic Stadium, Portland
Attendance: 20,129
Referee: Im Eun-ju (South Korea)

=== Germany vs Brazil ===
June 27, 1999
13:30 EDT (UTC−4)

Germany	3–3	Brazil
Prinz 8'; Wiegmann 46' (pen.); Jones 58'	Report	Kátia 15'; Sissi 20'; Maycon 90+4'

Jack Kent Cooke Stadium, Landover
Attendance: 22,109
Referee: Im Eun-ju (South Korea)

=== Mexico vs Italy ===
June 27, 1999
16:30 EDT (UTC−4)

Mexico	0–2	Italy
	Report	Panico 37'; Zanni 51'

Foxboro Stadium, Foxborough
Attendance: 50,484
Referee: Bola Elizabeth Abidoye (Nigeria)

== See also ==
- Brazil at the FIFA Women's World Cup
- Germany at the FIFA Women's World Cup
- Italy at the FIFA Women's World Cup
- Mexico at the FIFA Women's World Cup
