= Ann Wenche Kleven =

Norwegian football referee

Ann Wenche Kleven (born 7 May 1968) is a retired Norwegian football referee.

She started out as a referee in 1983 and was a FIFA referee from 1995 to 2008. She officiated during the 1999 FIFA Women's World Cup. In men's football, she was an assistant referee in 50 Eliteserien games.
