= Jo Song-ok =

North Korean footballer (born 1974)

Personal information
- Full name: Jo Song-ok
- Date of birth: 18 March 1974 (age 52)
- Place of birth: North Korea
- Position: Forward

International career^{‡}
Years	Team	Apps	(Gls)
1998–2002	North Korea	3+	(2+)
- ‡ National team caps and goals as of 29 June 1999 (before the 1999 FIFA Women's World Cup)

Jo Song-ok (Korean: 조성옥; born 18 March 1974) is a North Korean former women's international footballer who played as a forward. She was a member of the North Korea women's national football team. She was part of the team at the 1999 FIFA Women's World Cup.

== International goals ==
No.	Date	Venue	Opponent	Score	Result	Competition
1.	20 June 1999	Pasadena, United States	Nigeria	1–1	1–2	1999 FIFA Women's World Cup
2.	24 June 1999	Portland, United States	Denmark	1–0	3–1	1999 FIFA Women's World Cup
