= Silje Jørgensen =

Norwegian footballer (born 1977)

Personal information
- Full name: Silje Jørgensen Anzjøn
- Date of birth: 5 May 1977 (age 49)
- Place of birth: Kristiansand, Norway
- Height: 5 ft 6 in (1.68 m)
- Position: Midfielder

Senior career*
Years	Team	Apps	(Gls)
- Vidar
- Haugar
1996–2001	Klepp		

International career^{‡}
1996–2001	Norway	43	(2)
Medal record
Women's football
Representing Norway
Olympic Games
Gold medal – first place	2000 Sydney	Team
- * Club domestic league appearances and goals as of 14:16, 3 October 2014 (UTC) ‡ National team caps and goals as of 14:16, 3 October 2014 (UTC)

Silje Jørgensen Anzjøn (born 5 May 1977) is a Norwegian former footballer who debuted for the Norway women's national football team in 1996, and won 43 caps. She played in the national team at the 1999 FIFA Women's World Cup and received a gold medal at the 2000 Summer Olympics in Sydney. At club level Jørgensen played 178 times and scored 46 goals in six seasons with Klepp IL of the Toppserien.

== Personal life ==
Jørgensen was born in Kristiansand on 5 May 1977.
