= Ifeanyi Chiejine =

Nigerian footballer (1983–2019)

Personal information
- Full name: Ifeanyichukwu Stephanie Chiejine
- Date of birth: 17 May 1983
- Place of birth: Lagos, Nigeria
- Date of death: 21 August 2019 (aged 36)
- Position: Forward

Senior career*
| Years | Team | Apps | (Gls) |
| 2009 | KMF Kuopio | | |
| 2013 | CSHVSM | | |

International career
| 2002 | Nigeria U-19 | | |
| 1999–2008 | Nigeria | | |
- * Club domestic league appearances and goals

Ifeanyichukwu Stephanie Chiejine (17 May 1983 – 21 August 2019) was a Nigerian football who played as a striker for the national women's team. She last played for SSVSM-Kairat Almaty in the Kazakhstani Championship. She had also played for FC Indiana in USA's W-League, KMF Kuopio and PK-35 Vantaa in Finland and Zvezda Perm in Russia.

== International career ==
She had been a senior international, taking part in the 1999 where she held the record as the youngest female footballer to grace the World Cup until 2023, 2003 and 2007 World Cups and the 2000, participated in four CAF Women's Championship editions (2002, 2004, 2006, and 2004), winning three of them (2002, 2004, 2006), and 2008 Summer Olympics. As of 2007, she had scored 15 goals in 61 games for Nigeria.

== Death ==
She died on 21 August 2019 following a brief illness.

== See also ==
- Casey Phair - Became the youngest player to appear at a FIFA Women's World Cup in 2023, a distinction held by Chiejine until then
