= Janni Johansen =

Danish footballer (born 1976)

Personal information
- Full name: Janni Lund Johansen
- Date of birth: 14 January 1976 (age 50)
- Position: Forward

Senior career*
Years	Team	Apps	(Gls)
- Rødovre BK

International career
- Denmark
- * Club domestic league appearances and goals

Janni Lund Johansen (born 14 January 1976) is a Danish women's international footballer who plays as a forward. She is a member of the Denmark women's national football team. She was part of the team at the UEFA Women's Euro 1997 and 1999 FIFA Women's World Cup.
