= Paola Zanni =

Italian footballer

Personal information
- Date of birth: 12 June 1977 (age 49)
- Position: Defender

International career^{‡}
Years	Team	Apps	(Gls)
- Italy
- ‡ National team caps and goals as of 19 June 1999 (before the 1999 FIFA Women's World Cup)

Paola Zanni (born 12 June 1977) is an Italian footballer who played as a defender for the Italy women's national football team. She was part of the team at the 1999 FIFA Women's World Cup.
