= Natalia Karasseva =

Russian footballer (born 1977)

Personal information
- Date of birth: 30 April 1977 (age 49)
- Position: Defender

International career^{‡}
| Years | Team | Apps | (Gls) |
| 1999–2002 | Russia | 7 | (1) |
- ‡ National team caps and goals as of 19 June 1999 (before the 1999 FIFA Women's World Cup)

Natalia Karasseva (born 30 April 1977) is a former Russian footballer who played as a defender for the Russia women's national football team. She was part of the team at the 1999 FIFA Women's World Cup and the UEFA Women's Euro 2001.
