= Qiu Haiyan =

Chinese footballer

Personal information
- Date of birth: 17 June 1974 (age 52)
- Place of birth: China
- Position: Midfielder

International career
Years	Team	Apps	(Gls)
2000	China		
Medal record
Women's football
Representing China
Asian Games
Gold medal – first place	1998 Bangkok	Team

Qiu Haiyan (born 17 June 1974) is a female Chinese former football midfielder.

She was part of the China women's national football team at the 1999 FIFA Women's World Cup, and at the 2000 Summer Olympics, but at the Summer Olympics, she did not play.

== Bibliography ==
- Emma Carlson Berne (1 February 2016). What a Kick: How a Clutch World Cup Win Propelled Women's Soccer. Capstone. pp. 12–. ISBN 978-0-7565-5414-9.

== See also ==
- China at the 2000 Summer Olympics
