= Nkechi Egbe =

Nigerian former football forward

Personal information
- Date of birth: 5 February 1978 (age 48)
- Place of birth: Nigeria
- Position: Forward

Senior career*
Years	Team	Apps	(Gls)
2004	Delta Queens		

International career
2004	Nigeria	35 (?)	(15)
- * Club domestic league appearances and goals

Nkechi Egbe (born 5 February 1978) is a Nigerian former football forward who played as a forward for the Nigeria women's national football team at the 2004 Summer Olympics. At the club level, she played for Delta Queens.

== See also ==
- Nigeria at the 2004 Summer Olympics
