= Galina Komarova =

Russian footballer (born 1977)

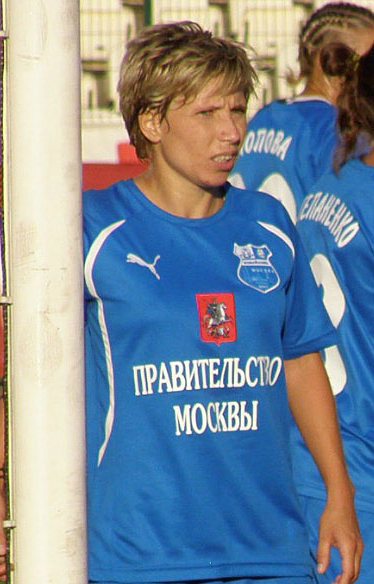
- Komarova in 2010

Personal information
- Date of birth: 12 August 1977 (age 49)
- Position: Midfielder

Senior career*
Years	Team	Apps	(Gls)
2009	Lada Togliatti	2	(0)
2010	Izmailovo	23	(2)

International career^{‡}
	Russia	8	(0)
- * Club domestic league appearances and goals ‡ National team caps and goals as of 4 October 2003

Galina Komarova (born 12 August 1977) is a former Russian women's international footballer who played as a midfielder. She was a member of the Russia women's national football team. She was part of the team at the 1999 FIFA Women's World Cup and 2003 FIFA Women's World Cup.
