= Olga Karasseva =

Russian footballer (born 1975)

Personal information
- Date of birth: 10 June 1975 (age 51)
- Position: Forward

International career
Years	Team	Apps	(Gls)
	Russia	4	(1)

Olga Karasseva (born 6 October 1975) is a former Russian footballer who played as a forward for the Russia women's national football team. She was part of the team at the 1999 FIFA Women's World Cup and UEFA Women's Euro 2001.
