= Maycon (footballer, born 1977) =

Brazilian footballer

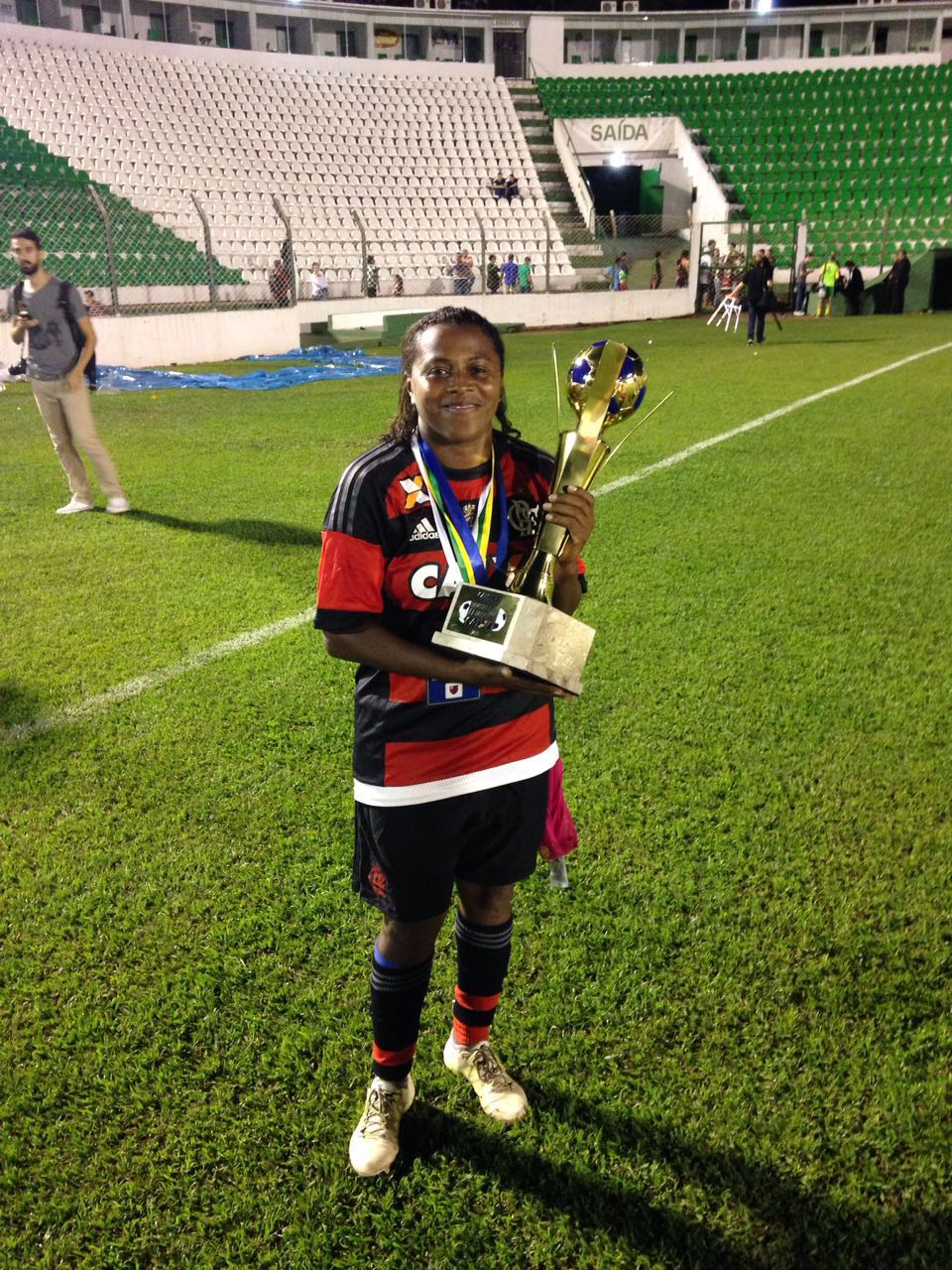

Personal information
- Date of birth: April 30, 1977 (age 49)

Senior career*
Years	Team	Apps	(Gls)
- Saad
- Flamengo

International career
- Brazil
Medal record
Women's Football (soccer)
Representing Brazil
Olympic Games
Silver medal – second place	2004 Athens	Team competition
Silver medal – second place	2008 Beijing	Team competition
Pan American Games
Gold medal – first place	2003 Santo Domingo	Team competition
Gold medal – first place	2007 Rio de Janeiro	Team competition
Silver medal – second place	2011 Guadalajara	Team competition
- * Club domestic league appearances and goals

Andréia dos Santos known as Maycon (born April 30, 1977, in Lages, Santa Catarina) is a Brazilian women's association football player. She currently plays as a midfielder for Brazil's Saad EC. She was a member of the Brazilian National Team that won the silver medal at the 2004 Summer Olympics. She is known for her speed and dribbling ability.

Her nickname is originated from a similarity with her idol, Michael Jackson.
