= Elena Fomina =

Russian footballer (born 1979)

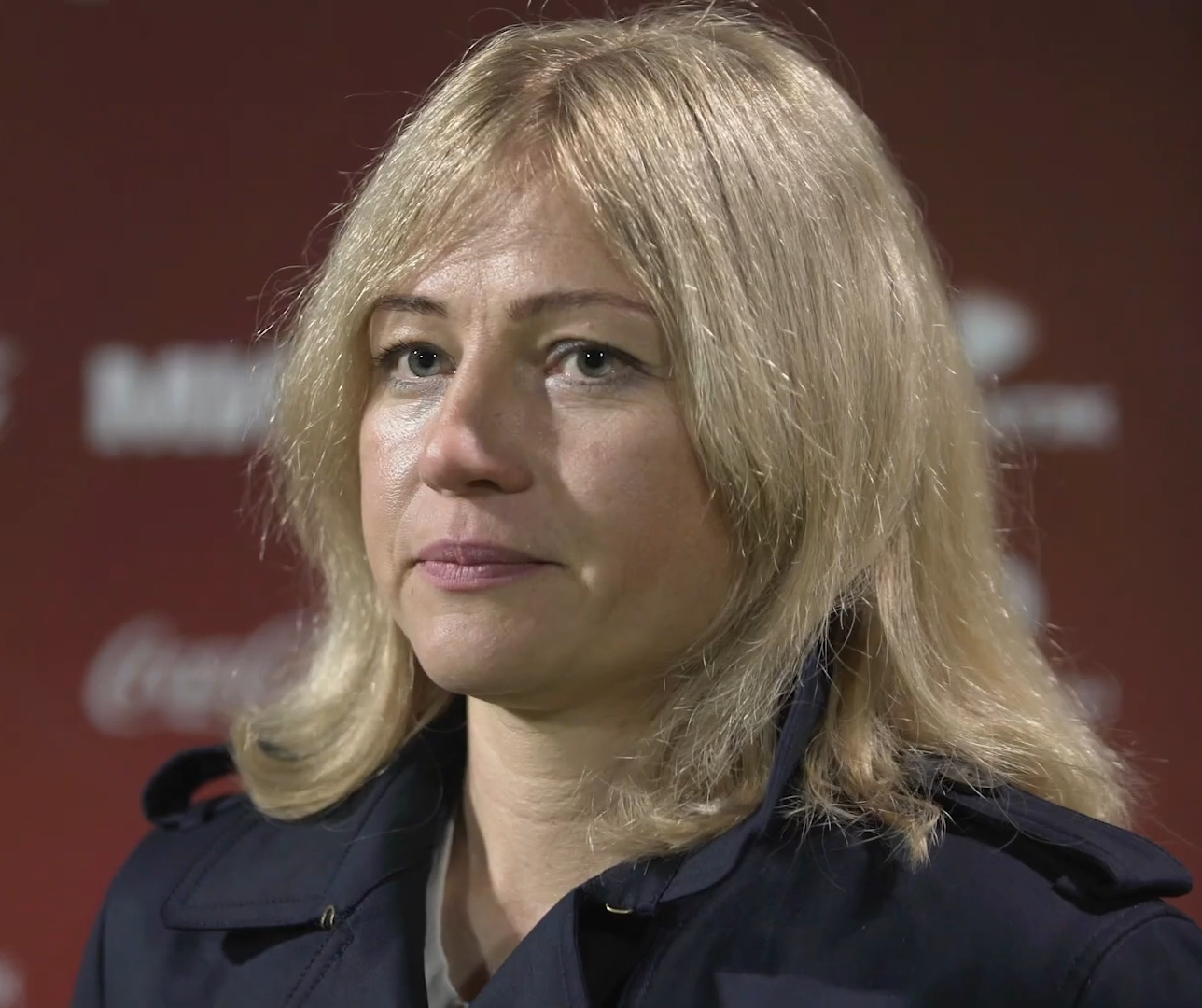
- Fomina in November 2020

Personal information
- Full name: Elena Fomina
- Date of birth: 5 April 1979 (age 47)
- Place of birth: Soviet Union
- Height: 1.74 m (5 ft 9 in)
- Position: Midfielder

Senior career*
Years	Team	Apps	(Gls)
1995	Spartak-SKIF Moscow		
1996–2000	Chertanovo Moscow		
2002	Lada Togliatti		
2003	CSK VVS Samara		
2004	Nadezhda Noginsk		
2005–2006	Spartak Moscow		
2007–2012	ShVSM Izmailovo		

International career
1999–2012	Russia	51	(6)

Managerial career
- 2013–2016: Rossiyanka
- 2015–2020: Russia
- 2018–: Lokomotiv Moscow
- 2024–: Iran
- * Club domestic league appearances and goals

Elena Fomina is a former Russian football midfielder, who played for ShVSM Izmailovo in the Russian women's football championship She previously played for Spartak Moscow, Chertanovo Moscow, CSK VVS Samara, Lada Togliatti and Nadezhda Noginsk.

She has been a member of the Russian national team, and played the 2003 World Cup, where she scored a last-minute winner in the first match against Australia and the 2009 European Championship.
