= Kari Seitz =

American soccer referee

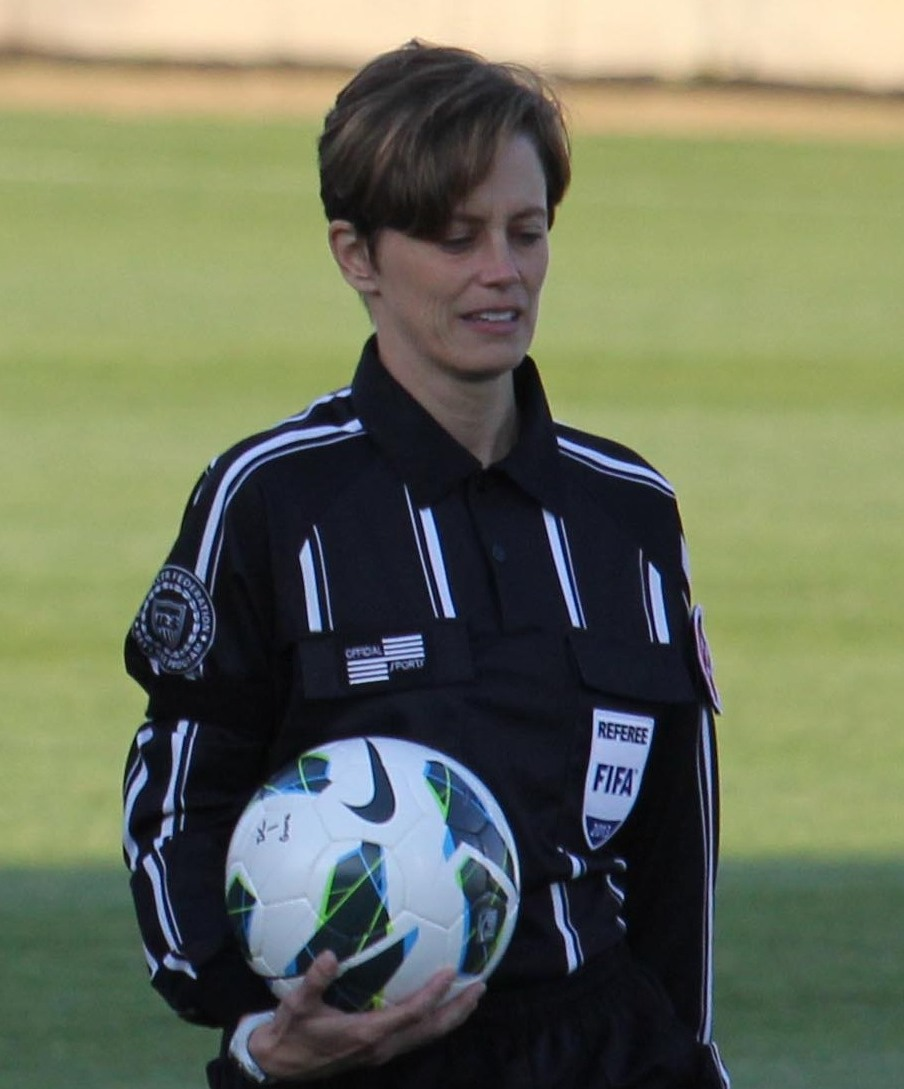
- Full name: Kari Seitz
- Born: 2 November 1970 (age 55); United States
- Other occupation: US Soccer Vice President of Refereeing

Domestic
Years	League	Role

International
Years	League	Role
1999-2013	FIFA-listed	Referee

Kari Seitz is an American retired professional soccer referee and one of the most experienced female referees in the world (out of the male and female referees). She is currently the Vice President of Refereeing for US Soccer.

== Referee career ==
She participated in four FIFA Women's World Cup tournaments in (1999, 2003, 2007 and 2011), as well as three Olympic soccer tournaments (2004, 2008, and 2012) and is the only referee — man or woman — to do so.

In October 2013, she announced she would be retiring later in the month after a 28-year career. Her final assignments included the 2013 National Women's Soccer League championship match, the league's first.

Seitz was inducted into the National Soccer Hall of Fame in 2026.

== Management ==
At the request of FIFA, in 2016 she began managing training for Women's Soccer Referees worldwide. She and her husband relocated to Switzerland in 2016 and she assumed her duties within the FIFA organization.

Seitz served in several different roles while working in FIFA. She was the Sr Manager of Refereeing from 2016 to 2019. She was a Group Leader of FIFA Refereeing until late 2020. She then transitioned to the FIFA Head of Refereeing for the women until 2024.

Kari Seitz became the Vice President of Refereeing for US Soccer in April 2024.
