= Katriina Elovirta =

Finnish footballer and referee (1961–2018)

- Elovirta in 2006

Personal information
- Date of birth: 15 February 1961
- Place of birth: Iisalmi, Finland
- Date of death: 19 June 2018 (aged 57)
- Place of death: Espoo, Finland
- Position: Midfielder

Senior career*
Years	Team	Apps	(Gls)
- Helsinki United

International career
- Finland
- * Club domestic league appearances and goals

Katriina Elovirta (15 February 1961 – 19 June 2018) was a Finnish female footballer and was a well known international match referee who served from 1991 to 2003. She served as a referee affiliating with FIFA between 1995 and 2003 She also worked as a development manager for the Finnish Football Association until her death. Elovirta died at age 57 after a long illness.

== Career ==
=== As a player ===
Elovirta appeared in 9 international matches as a midfielder for Finland and was a member of the Helsinki United team which won its first domestic Finnish Women's Cup title in 1990 beating FC Kontu 3–2 in the final.

=== As a referee ===
Elovirta went on to become a match referee in 1991 after retiring from playing in international football. She served as a referee in many women's football championships including the 1999 FIFA Women's World Cup, 2003 FIFA Women's World Cup, UEFA Women's Euro 197, UEFA Women's Euro 2001 and 2001–02 UEFA Women's Cup. She also notably served as a match official at the 1999 FIFA Women's World Cup Final and in the 2002 UEFA Women's Cup Final. In 2005, she was appointed as one of the 5 women instructors as a part of the FIFA technical group.
