= Sandra Hunt =

American soccer referee (born 1959)

- Full name: Sandra Hunt
- Born: 14 June 1959 (age 67); Bellingham, Washington, U.S.
- Other occupation: Referee coach (PRO)

Domestic
Years	League	Role
1998–	Major League Soccer	Referee

International
Years	League	Role
1999–2004	FIFA-listed	Referee

Sandra Hunt (born June 14, 1959) is a former soccer referee from the United States. She was a FIFA referee from 1999 to 2004 and currently works as a referee coach for Professional Referee Organization (PRO). Hunt was selected for the FIFA Women's World Cup in 1999 and 2003, as well as the 2000 Sydney Olympics.

Hunt, from Bellingham, Washington began refereeing in 1987. In August 1998 Hunt became one of the first two women to officiate in Major League Soccer (MLS), overseeing a match in Kansas City as Nancy Lay-McCormick simultaneously refereed a match in Dallas. Hunt also refereed in Women's United Soccer Association (WUSA).
