= Zhang Ouying =

Chinese footballer

Personal information
- Full name: Zhang Ouying
- Date of birth: 2 November 1975
- Place of birth: Zhangjiakou, Hebei, China
- Date of death: 1 December 2018 (aged 43)
- Place of death: San Diego, California, United States
- Height: 5 ft 5 in (1.65 m)
- Position: Forward

Senior career*
Years	Team	Apps	(Gls)
1991–2002	Hebei		
2002–2003	San Diego Spirit	37	(6)
2006–2008	San Diego WFC SeaLions		

International career
1998–2007	China		
Medal record
Women's football
Representing China
Asian Games
Gold medal – first place	1998 Bangkok	Team
- * Club domestic league appearances and goals

Zhang Ouying (simplified Chinese: 张欧影; traditional Chinese: 張歐影; pinyin: Zhāng Ōuyǐng; 2 November 1975 – 1 December 2018) was a Chinese football (soccer) player who competed in the 2000 Summer Olympics and in the 2004 Summer Olympics as well as the 1999, 2003, and 2007 FIFA Women's World Cup. She was a member of the Chinese team that won the silver medal at the 1999 World Cup.

== Life ==
Zhang was born in Zhangjiakou, Hebei, in 1975. In 2000, she finished fifth with the Chinese team in the 2000 Summer Olympics. She played all three matches. Four years later she finished ninth with the Chinese team in the 2004 Summer Olympics. She played in one match.

She married an American in 2006, and moved to the United States after retirement.

From 2010 to 2012, she coached numerous teams at the San Diego Futbol Academy in Rancho Peñasquitos, San Diego. After that, she coached teams for the San Diego Soccer Club and was often referred to as "Coach O".

Zhang was diagnosed with lung cancer in March 2018, and died in San Diego on 1 December 2018, at the age of 43.

== See also ==
- List of women's footballers with 100 or more international caps
