= Jin Yan (footballer) =

Chinese footballer

Personal information
- Date of birth: 27 July 1972 (age 54)
- Place of birth: Beijing, China
- Position: Forward

International career
Years	Team	Apps	(Gls)
1996-2002	China		
Medal record
Women's football
Representing China
Asian Games
Gold medal – first place	1998 Bangkok	Team

Jin Yan (born 27 July 1972) is a female Chinese former football forward. She was part of the China women's national football team at the 2000 Summer Olympics.

== International goals ==
No.	Date	Venue	Opponent	Score	Result	Competition
1.	19 June 1999	CEFCU Stadium, San Jose, United States	Sweden	1–1	2–1	1999 FIFA Women's World Cup
2.	23 June 1999	CEFCU Stadium, San Jose, United States	Ghana	2–0	7–0	1999 FIFA Women's World Cup
3.	30 June 1999	CEFCU Stadium, San Jose, United States	Russia	2–0	2–0	1999 FIFA Women's World Cup

== See also ==
- China at the 2000 Summer Olympics
