= United States women's national soccer team results (1985–1999) =

== 1980s ==
The team was founded in 1985, and played 31 matched before the end of the decade.

=== 1985 ===
Date	Competition	Location	Opponent	Result	US scorers
August 18, 1985	Mundialito Tournament	Jesolo, Italy	Italy	0–1	n/a
August 21, 1985	Mundialito	Jesolo, Italy	Denmark	2–2	Michelle Akers, Emily Pickering
August 23, 1985	Mundialito	Caorle, Italy	England	1–3	Michelle Akers
August 24, 1985	Mundialito	Jesolo, Italy	Denmark	0–1	n/a

=== 1986 ===
Date	Competition	Location	Opponent	Result	US scorers
July 7, 1986	Friendly	Blaine, Minnesota	Canada	2–0	Marcia McDermott, Joan Dunlap
July 9, 1986	Friendly	Blaine, Minnesota	Canada	1–2	Lisa Gmitter
July 9, 1986	Friendly	Blaine, Minnesota	Canada	3–0	April Heinrichs (2), Marcia McDermott
July 20, 1986	Mundialito	Jesolo, Italy	China	2–1	April Heinrichs, Marcia McDermott
July 22, 1986	Mundialito	Jesolo, Italy	Brazil	2–1	Emily Pickering, April Heinrichs
July 25, 1986	Mundialito	Jesolo, Italy	Japan	3–1	April Heinrichs, Marcia McDermott (2)
July 26, 1986	Mundialito	Jesolo, Italy	Italy	0–1	n/a

=== 1987 ===
Date	Competition	Location	Opponent	Result	US scorers
July 5, 1987	Friendly	Blaine, Minnesota	Norway	3–0	Shannon Higgins, April Heinrichs
July 7, 1987	Friendly	Blaine, Minnesota	Canada	4–2	Denise Boyer-Murdich, Carin Jennings, April Heinrichs (2)
July 9, 1987	Friendly	Blaine, Minnesota	Sweden	1–2	April Heinrichs
July 11, 1987	North America Cup	Blaine, Minnesota	Norway	0–1	n/a
August 3, 1987	Friendly	Tianjin, China	China	2–0	Carin Jennings (2)
August 13, 1987	Friendly	Shenyang, China	China	1–1	Kristine Lilly
December 12, 1987	Women's World Invitation Tournament	Taipei, Taiwan	Japan	1–0	Lori Henry
December 15, 1987	Women's World Invitation Tournament	Taipei, Taiwan	New Zealand	0–1	n/a
December 16, 1987	Women's World Invitation Tournament	Taipei, Taiwan	Australia	6–0	Lori Henry, Michelle Akers, Joy Biefeld, April Heinrichs (2), Lisa Gmitter
December 19, 1987	Women's World Invitation Tournament	Taipei, Taiwan	Canada	4–0	Michelle Akers (2), Lisa Gmitter, Wendy Gebauer
December 20, 1987	Women's World Invitation Tournament	Taipei, Taiwan	Taiwan	1–2	Joy Biefeld

=== 1988 ===
Date	Competition	Location	Opponent	Result	US scorers
June 1, 1988	FIFA Women's Invitation Tournament Group C	Panyu, China	Japan	5–2	Lori Henry, Tracey Bates, Carin Jennings (3)
June 3, 1988	FIFA Women's Invitation Tournament Group C	Panyu, China	Sweden	1–1	Debbie Belkin
June 5, 1988	FIFA Women's Invitation Tournament Group C	Panyu, China	Czechoslovakia	0–0	n/a
June 8, 1988	FIFA Women's Invitation Tournament Quarterfinal	Panyu, China	Norway	0–1	n/a
July 22, 1988	Mundialito	Rimini, Italy	West Germany	2–1	Carin Jennings (2)
July 24, 1988	Mundialito	Rimini, Italy	Italy	1–2	Joy Biefeld
July 27, 1988	Mundialito Semifinal	Rimini, Italy	England	0–2	n/a
July 29, 1988	Mundialito 3rd Place Match	Rimini, Italy	France	1–0	Wendy Gebauer

=== 1989 ===
Date	Competition	Location	Opponent	Result	US scorers
June 21, 1989	Friendly	Sardinia, Italy	Poland	0–0	n/a

== 1990s ==
The 1990s saw a surge of popularity with the team, introducing the first Concacaf Championships, Women's World Cups, Olympic Tournament, and Algarve Cups, all of which were won at least once by the US. The team became national heroes after winning the 1999 World Cup.

=== 1990 ===
Date	Competition	Location	Opponent	Result	US scorers
July 25, 1990	Friendly	Winnipeg, Manitoba	Norway	4–0	Carin Jennings, Michelle Akers-Stahl, April Heinrichs, Mia Hamm
July 27, 1990	Canada Cup	Winnipeg, Manitoba	Canada	4–1	Kristine Lilly, Carin Jennings, Mia Hamm, Wendy Gebauer
July 29, 1990	Canada Cup final	Winnipeg, Manitoba	Norway	4–2	Carin Jennings, Michelle Akers-Stahl, April Heinrichs (2)
August 5, 1990	North America Cup	Blaine, Minnesota	Soviet Union	8–0	Shannon Higgins, Carin Jennings, Mia Hamm (2), Michelle Akers-Stahl (3), April Heinrichs
August 9, 1990	North America Cup	Blaine, Minnesota	England	3–0	Michelle Akers-Stahl (2), April Heinrichs
August 11, 1990	North America Cup	Blaine, Minnesota	West Germany	3–0	Michelle Akers-Stahl (2), April Heinrichs

=== 1991 ===
Date	Competition	Location	Opponent	Result	US scorers	Notes
April 1, 1991	Grand Hotel Varna Tournament	Varna, Bulgaria	Yugoslavia	8–0	Tracey Bates, Shannon Higgins, April Heinrichs (2), Michelle Akers-Stahl (3), Wendy Gebauer	
April 2, 1991	Grand Hotel Varna Tournament	Varna, Bulgaria	Bulgaria	3–0	Joy Biefeld, Mia Hamm, Michelle Akers-Stahl	
April 3, 1991	Grand Hotel Varna Tournament	Varna, Bulgaria	Hungary	6–0	Julie Foudy (2), April Heinrichs, Carin Jennings, Wendy Gebauer (2)	
April 5, 1991	Grand Hotel Varna Tournament	Varna, Bulgaria	France	2–0	Kristine Lilly, Michelle Akers-Stahl	
April 7, 1991	Grand Hotel Varna Tournament Final	Varna, Bulgaria	Soviet Union	5–0	Kristine Lilly, April Heinrichs, Michelle Akers-Stahl (3)	
April 18, 1991	CONCACAF World Cup Qualifier	Port-au-Prince, Haiti	Mexico	12–0	Julie Foudy, Mia Hamm, April Heinrichs (2), Michelle Akers-Stahl (2), Brandi Chastain (5), Carin Jennings	
April 20, 1991	CONCACAF World Cup Qualifier	Port-au-Prince, Haiti	Martinique	12–0	Joy Biefeld (2), Julie Foudy, Mia Hamm (2), April Heinrichs (3), Michelle Akers-Stahl (2), Brandi Chastain, Wendy Gebauer	
April 22, 1991	CONCACAF World Cup Qualifier	Port-au-Prince, Haiti	Trinidad & Tobago	10–0	Mia Hamm (2), Tracey Bates, Carin Jennings (2), Wendy Gebauer (2), Michelle Akers-Stahl (2), Brandi Chastain	
April 25, 1991	CONCACAF World Cup Qualifier	Port-au-Prince, Haiti	Haiti	10–0	Joy Biefeld, Tracey Bates (2), Kristine Lilly, Carin Jennings (2), Michelle Akers-Stahl (2), April Heinrichs (2)	
April 28, 1991	CONCACAF World Cup Qualifier Final	Port-au-Prince, Haiti	Canada	5–0	Kristine Lilly, Michelle Akers-Stahl (3), April Heinrichs	
May 18, 1991	Friendly	Lyon, France	France	4–0	Debbie Belkin, April Heinrichs (2), Michelle Akers-Stahl	
May 25, 1991	Friendly	Hirson, France	England	3–1	April Heinrichs, Michelle Akers-Stahl, Carin Jennings	
May 28, 1991	Friendly	Vianen, Netherlands	Netherlands	3–4	Kristine Lilly, Mia Hamm, Carin Jennings	
May 30, 1991	Friendly	Kaiserslautern, Germany	Germany	4–2	Carin Jennings (2), Michelle Akers-Stahl (2)	
June 5, 1991	Friendly	Odense, Denmark	Denmark	0–1	n/a	
August 4, 1991	Friendly	Changchun, China	China	1–2	Michelle Akers-Stahl	
August 8, 1991	Friendly	Yanji, China	China	2–2	Mia Hamm, Michelle Akers-Stahl	
August 10, 1991	Friendly	Anshan, China	China	3–0	Michelle Akers-Stahl (3)	
August 30, 1991	Friendly	New Britain, Connecticut	Norway	0–1	n/a	
September 1, 1991	Friendly	Medford, Massachusetts	Norway	1–2	Kristine Lilly	
October 4, 1991	Friendly	Oakford, Pennsylvania	China	1–2	Shannon Higgins	
October 12, 1991	Friendly	Fairfax, Virginia	China	2–0	Kristine Lilly, Michelle Akers-Stahl	
November 17, 1991	Women's World Cup Group B	Panyu, China	Sweden	3–2	Carin Jennings (2), Mia Hamm	
November 19, 1991	Women's World Cup Group B	Panyu, China	Brazil	5–0	April Heinrichs (2), Carin Jennings, Michelle Akers-Stahl, Mia Hamm	
November 21, 1991	Women's World Cup Group B	Foshan, China	Japan	3–0	Michelle Akers-Stahl (2), Wendy Gebauer	
November 24, 1991	Women's World Cup Quarterfinal	Foshan, China	Chinese Taipei	7–0	Michelle Akers-Stahl (5), Julie Foudy, Joy Biefeld	
November 27, 1991	Women's World Cup semifinal	Guangzhou, China	Germany	5–2	Carin Jennings (3), April Heinrichs (2)	
November 30, 1991	Women's World Cup final	Guangzhou, China	Norway	2–1	Michelle Akers-Stahl (2)	

=== 1992 ===
Date	Competition	Location	Opponent	Score	US scorers
August 14, 1992	Friendly	Medford, Massachusetts	Norway	1–3	Mia Hamm
August 16, 1992	Friendly	New Britain, Connecticut	Norway	2–4	Tiffeny Milbrett, Own Goal

=== 1993 ===
Date	Competition	Location	Opponent	Score	US scorers
March 11, 1993	Cyprus Tournament	Agia, Cyprus	Denmark	2–0	Mia Hamm, Michelle Akers-Stahl
March 12, 1993	Cyprus Tournament	Agai, Cyprus	Norway	0–1	n/a
March 14, 1993	Cyprus Tournament	Agai, Cyprus	Germany	0–1	n/a
April 7, 1993	Friendly	Oakford, Pennsylvania	Germany	1–2	Joy Fawcett
April 10, 1993	Friendly	Decatur, Georgia	Germany	3–0	Kristine Lilly (2), Tisha Venturini
June 12, 1993	Columbus Cup	Cincinnati, Ohio	Canada	7–0	Sarah Rafanelli, Joy Fawcett, Kristine Lilly, Carin Gabarra, Tiffeny Milbrett, Michelle Akers-Stahl (2)
June 15, 1993	Columbus Cup	Mansfield, Ohio	Italy	5–0	Tisha Venturini, Mia Hamm (2), Carin Gabarra, Kristine Lilly
June 19, 1993	Friendly	Columbus, Ohio	Italy	1–0	Mia Hamm
June 21, 1993	Friendly	Pontiac, Michigan	Canada	3–0	Joy Fawcett (2), Michelle Akers-Stahl
July 7, 1993	Friendly	Hamilton, Ontario	Australia	6–0	Danielle Egan, Mia Hamm (3), Kristine Lilly, Sarah Rafanelli
July 10, 1993	Friendly	Hamilton, Ontario	Japan	7–0	Sarah Rafanelli (3), Mia Hamm (2), Nancy Kramarz, Tisha Venturini
July 12, 1993	Friendly	Hamilton, Ontario	Chinese Taipei	3–1	Mia Hamm, Kristine Lilly, Tisha Venturini
July 14, 1993	Friendly	Hamilton, Ontario	Russia	2–0	Linda Hamilton, Kristine Lilly
July 17, 1993	Friendly	Hamilton, Ontario	China	1–2	Julie Foudy
August 4, 1993	CONCACAF Women's Invitational Championship	New Hyde Park, New York	New Zealand	3–0	Kristine Lilly, Carin Gabarra, Sarah Rafanelli
August 6, 1993	CONCACAF Women's Invitational Championship	New Hyde Park, New York	Trinidad & Tobago	9–0	Joy Fawcett, Kristine Lilly, Tisha Venturini, Carin Gabarra, Christina Kaufman, Michelle Akers-Stahl (2), Sarah Rafanelli
August 8, 1993	CONCACAF Women's Invitational Tournament	New Hyde Park, New York	Canada	1–0	Joy Fawcett

=== 1994 ===
Date	Competition	Location	Opponent	Score	US scorers
March 16, 1994	Algarve Cup	Silves, Portugal	Portugal	5–0	Julie Foudy, Kristine Lilly, Carin Gabarra (2), Tiffeny Milbrett
March 18, 1994	Algarve Cup	Vila Real Santo Antonio, Portugal	Sweden	1–0	Mia Hamm
March 20, 1994	Algarve Cup final	Faro, Portugal	Norway	0–1	n/a
April 10, 1994	Tri-Nations Tournament	Scarborough, Tobago	Trinidad & Tobago	3–1	Tiffany Roberts, Julie Foudy, Kristine Lilly
April 14, 1994	Tri-Nations Tournament	San Fernando, Trinidad	Canada	4–1	Carin Gabarra (2), Michelle Akers-Stahl (2)
April 17, 1994	Tri-Nations Tournament	Port of Spain, Trinidad	Canada	3–0	Tisha Venturini, Michelle Akers-Stahl, Shannon MacMillan
July 31, 1994	Chiquita Cup	Fairfax	Germany	2–1	Mia Hamm, Michelle Akers-Stahl
August 3, 1994	Chiquita Cup	Piscataway, New Jersey	China	1–0	Julie Foudy
August 7, 1994	Chiquita Cup	Worcester, Massachusetts	Norway	4–1	Mia Hamm (2), Michelle Akers-Stahl, Own Goal
August 13, 1994	CONCACAF World Cup Qualifier	Montreal, Quebec	Mexico	9–0	Kristine Lilly (2), Tisha Venturini, Jennifer Lalor, Tiffany Roberts, Carin Gabarra, Mia Hamm (2)
August 17, 1994	CONCACAF World Cup Qualifier	Montreal, Quebec	Trinidad & Tobago	11–1	Amanda Cromwell, Tisha Venturini (2), Kristine Lilly, Carin Gabarra (2), Mia Hamm (4), Michelle Akers-Stahl
August 19, 1994	CONCACAF World Cup Qualifier	Montreal, Quebec	Jamaica	10–0	Carla Overbeck (2), Tiffany Roberts, Kristine Lilly (2), Carin Gabarra, Sara Rafanelli, Michelle Akers-Stahl (2), Tiffeny Milbrett
August 21, 1994	CONCACAF World Cup Qualifier	Montreal, Quebec	Canada	6–0	Mia Hamm, Tiffany Roberts, Carin Gabarra, Julie Foudy, Michelle Akers-Stahl, Own Goal

=== 1995 ===
Date	Competition	Location	Opponent	Score	US scorers	Notes
January 20	Friendly	Phoenix, Arizona	Australia	5–0	Tisha Venturini (2), Carin Gabarra (2), Michelle Akers	
January 23	Friendly	Phoenix, Arizona	Australia	4–1	Tisha Venturini, Carin Gabarra, Michelle Akers, Own Goal	
February 24	Friendly	Orlando, Florida	Denmark	7–0	Tiffany Roberts, Mia Hamm (2), Kristine Lilly, Michelle Akers (3)	
March 14	Algarve Cup	Faro, Portugal	Finland	2–0	Mia Hamm, Kristine Lilly	
March 16	Algarve Cup	Portimão, Portugal	Portugal	3–0	Kristine Lilly, Tiffeny Milbrett, Carin Gabarra	
March 17	Algarve Cup	Lagos, Portugal	Denmark	0–2	n/a	
March 19	Algarve Cup	Quaeira, Portugal	Norway	3(2)–3(4)	Michelle Akers, Carin Gabarra, Kristine Lilly	
April 11	Tournoi International Feminin	Poissy, France	Italy	3–0	Michelle Akers, Tisha Venturini, Carin Gabarra	
April 12	Tournoi International Feminin	Saint-Maur-des-Fossés, France	Canada	5–0	Mia Hamm (3), Tiffeny Milbrett, Michelle Akers	
April 15	Tournoi International Feminin	Strasbourg, France	France	3–0	Carin Gabarra, Kristine Lilly, Mia Hamm	
April 28	Friendly	Decatur, Georgia	Finland	2–0	Tisha Venturini, Michelle Akers	
April 30	Friendly	Davidson, North Carolina	Finland	6–0	Kristine Lilly, Michelle Akers, Natalie Neaton, Julie Foudy, Mia Hamm, Own Goal	
May 12	Friendly	Tacoma, Washington	Brazil	3–0	Mia Hamm (2), Tisha Venturini	
May 14	Friendly	Portland, Oregon	Brazil	4–1	Tiffeny Milbrett, Michelle Akers (2), Carin Gabarra	
May 19	Friendly	Dallas, Texas	Canada	9–1	Mia Hamm (2), Carin Gabarra (2), Michelle Akers (2), Kristine Lilly (2), Tiffeny Milbrett	
May 22	Friendly	Edmonton, Alberta	Canada	2–1	Tiffeny Milbrett, Natalie Neaton	
June 6	Women's World Cup	Gävle, Sweden	China	3–3	Tisha Venturini, Tiffeny Milbrett, Mia Hamm	
June 8	Women's World Cup	Gävle, Sweden	Denmark	2–0	Kristine Lilly, Tiffeny Milbrett	
June 10	Women's World Cup	Helsingborg, Sweden	Australia	4–1	Julie Foudy, Joy Fawcett, Carla Overbeck (PK), Debbie Keller	
June 13	Women's World Cup QF	Gävle, Sweden	Japan	4–0	Kristine Lilly (2), Tiffeny Milbrett, Tisha Venturini	
June 15	Women's World Cup SF	Västerås, Sweden	Norway	0–1	n/a	
June 17	Women's World Cup 3rd Place Match	Gävle, Sweden	China	2–0	Tisha Venturini, Mia Hamm	
July 30	US Cup	New Britain, Connecticut	Chinese Taipei	9–0	Carla Overbeck (2), Tisha Venturini (3), Mia Hamm (2), Michelle Akers (2)	
August 3	US Cup	Piscataway, New Jersey	Australia	4–2	Kristine Lilly, Michelle Akers, Mia Hamm (2)	
August 6	US Cup	Washington, D.C.	Norway	2–1	Mia Hamm, Tammy Pearman	

=== 1996 ===
Date	Competition	Location	Opponent	Score	US scorers	Notes
January 14	Torneio do Brasil	Campinas, Brazil	Russia	8–1	Carin Gabarra, Michelle Akers, Cindy Parlow (2), Julie Foudy (2), Shannon MacMillan, Tiffeny Milbrett	
January 16	Torneio do Brasil	Campinas, Brazil	Brazil	3–2	Mia Hamm, Carin Gabarra, Tiffeny Milbrett	
January 18	Torneio do Brasil	Campinas, Brazil	Ukraine	6–0	Danielle Garrett (3), Shannon MacMillan, Jen Grubb, Tiffeny Milbrett	
January 20	Torneio do Brasil	Campinas, Brazil	Brazil	1(3)–1(2)	Tiffeny Millbrett	
February 2	Friendly	Tampa, Florida	Norway	3–2	Mia Hamm, Michelle Akers, Tiffeny Milbrett	
February 4	Friendly	Jacksonville, Florida	Norway	1–2	Brandi Chastain	
February 10	Friendly	Orlando, Florida	Denmark	2–1	Kristine Lilly, Carla Overbeck	
February 15	Friendly	San Antonio, Texas	Sweden	3–0	Shannon MacMillan, Tisha Venturini, Mia Hamm	
February 17	Friendly	Houston, Texas	Sweden	3–0	Tisha Venturini, Tiffeny Milbrett, Cindy Parlow	
March 14	Friendly	Decatur, Georgia	Germany	6–0	Carla Overbeck, Cindy Parlow, Brandi Chastain (PK), Tiffeny Milbrett (2), Mia Hamm	
March 16	Friendly	Davidson, North Carolina	Germany	2–0	Tiffeny Milbrett, Kristine Lilly	
April 20	Friendly	Fullerton, California	Netherlands	6–0	Tisha Venturini (2), Julie Foudy, Kristine Lilly (2), Michelle Akers	
April 26	Friendly	St. Louis, Missouri	France	4–1	Michelle Akers, Kristine Lilly, Cindy Parlow (2)	
April 28	Friendly	Indianapolis, Indiana	France	8–2	Mia Hamm (4), Shannon MacMillan, Tiffeny Milbrett, Michelle Akers, Carin Gabarra	
May 12	USA Cup	Worcester, Massachusetts	Canada	6–0	Julie Foudy, Tiffeny Milbrett, Shannon MacMillan, Carin Gabarra, Cindy Parlow, Tiffany Roberts	
May 16	USA Cup	Horsham, Pennsylvania	Japan	4–0	Tisha Venturini, Kristine Lilly (2), Carin Gabarra	
May 18	USA Cup	Washington, D.C.	China	1–0	Michelle Akers	
July 4	Friendly	Tampa, Florida	Australia	2–1	Tisha Venturini, Cindy Parlow	
July 6	Friendly	Pensacola, Florida	Australia	2–1	Tisha Venturini, Kristine Lilly	
July 21	Olympics	Orlando, Florida	Denmark	3–0	Tisha Venturini, Mia Hamm, Tiffeny Milbrett	
July 23	Olympics	Orlando, Florida	Sweden	2–1	Tisha Venturini, Shannon MacMillan	
July 25	Olympics	Miami, Florida	China	0–0	n/a	
July 28	Olympics Semifinal	Athens, Georgia	Norway	2–1 AET	Michelle Akers (PK), Shannon MacMillan	
August 1	Olympics Final	Athens, Georgia	China	2–1	Shannon MacMillan, Tiffeny Milbrett	

=== 1997 ===
Date	Competition	Location	Opponent	Score	US scorers
February 28	Friendly	Melbourne, Australia	Australia	4–0	Cindy Parlow, Tisha Venturini, Danielle Fotopoulos, Mia Hamm
March 3	Friendly	Bathurst, Australia	Australia	3–1	Justi Baumgardt, Kristine Lilly, Brandi Chastain (PK)
March 5	Friendly	Canberra, Australia	Australia	3–0	Brandi Chastain, Julie Foudy, Tiffeny Milbrett
April 24	Friendly	Greensboro, North Carolina	France	4–2	Robin Confer, Tisha Venturini, Shannon MacMillan, Kristine Lilly
April 27	Friendly	Tampa, Florida	France	2–1	Tisha Venturini (2)
May 2	Friendly	Milwaukee, Wisconsin	Korea	7–0	Mia Hamm (2), Shannon MacMillan (2), Tiffeny Milbrett (2), Christie Pearce
May 4	Friendly	St. Charles, Illinois	Korea	6–1	Kristine Lilly, Mia Hamm (2), Debbie Keller, Justi Baumgardt, Own Goal
May 9	Friendly (MLS Doubleheader)	San Jose, California	England	5–0	Shannon MacMillan, Mia Hamm (3), Julie Foudy
May 11	Friendly	Portland, Oregon	England	6–0	Mia Hamm, Cindy Parlow (2), Tiffeny Milbrett, Kristine Lilly, Debbie Keller
May 31	USA Cup	New Britain, Connecticut	Canada	4–0	Tiffeny Milbrett, Mia Hamm (3)
June 5	USA Cup	Ambler, Pennsylvania	Australia	9–1	Tiffeny Milbrett, Cindy Parlow (2), Mia Hamm (2), Christie Pearce, Kristine Lilly, Tisha Venturini, Debbie Keller
June 8	Friendly	Washington, D.C.	Italy	2–0	Cindy Parlow, Mia Hamm
October 9	Friendly	Duisburg, Germany	Germany	1–3	Kristine Lilly
October 12	Friendly	Salzgitter, Germany	Germany	3–0	Mia Hamm (2), Tiffeny Milbrett
October 30	Friendly	Chattanooga, Tennessee	Sweden	3–1	Julie Foudy, Tiffeny Milbrett, Kristi DeVert
November 1	Friendly	Chattanooga, Tennessee	Sweden	3–1	Tisha Venturini, Kristine Lilly, Michelle Akers
December 11	Friendly	Taubaté, Brazil	Brazil	2–1	Mia Hamm, Julie Foudy
December 13	Friendly	Sao Paulo, Brazil	Brazil	0–1	n/a

=== 1998 ===
Date	Competition	Location	Opponent	Score	US scorers
January 18	Guangzhou International Tournament	Guangzhou, China	Sweden	3–0	Tisha Venturini, Tiffeny Milbrett, Debbie Keller
January 21	Guangzhou International Tournament	Guangzhou, China	China	0–0	n/a
January 24	Guangzhou International Tournament	Guangzhou, China	Norway	3–0	Tisha Venturini, Mia Hamm, Cindy Parlow
March 15	Algarve Cup	Olhão, Portugal	Finland	2–0	Michelle Akers, Brandi Chastain (PK)
March 17	Algarve Cup	Loulé, Portugal	China	4–1	Mia Hamm (3), Kristine Lilly
March 19	Algarve Cup	Lagos, Portugal	Norway	1–4	Brandi Chastain (PK)
March 21	Algarve Cup	Quarteira, Portugal	Sweden	3–1	Julie Foudy, Brandi Chastain (PK), Kristine Lilly
April 24	Friendly	Fullerton, California	Argentina	8–1	Tiffeny Milbrett (3), Michelle Akers, Debbie Keller (2), Mia Hamm (2)
April 26	Friendly	San Jose, California	Argentina	7–0	Kristine Lilly, Tiffeny Milbrett (2), Michelle Akers, Brandi Chastain (PK), Julie Foudy, Own Goal
May 8	Friendly	Indianapolis, Indiana	Iceland	6–0	Tiffeny Milbrett, Mia Hamm (2), Sara Whalen, Tisha Venturini, Debbie Keller
May 10	Friendly	Bethlehem, Pennsylvania	Iceland	1–0	Natalie Neaton
May 17	Friendly	Tokyo, Japan	Japan	2–1	Debbie Keller (2)
May 21	Friendly	Kobe, Japan	Japan	2–0	Kristine Lilly, Debbie Keller
May 24	Friendly	Tokyo, Japan	Japan	3–0	Brandi Chastain, Kristine Lilly, Tisha Venturini
May 30	Friendly (MLS Doubleheader)	Washington, D.C.	New Zealand	5–0	Cindy Parlow, Debbie Keller (2), Lorrie Fair, Tiffeny Milbrett
June 25	Friendly	St. Louis, Missouri	Germany	1–1	Cindy Parlow
June 28	Friendly	Chicago, Illinois	Germany	4–2	Kristine Lilly, Mia Hamm (3)
July 25	Goodwill Games SF	Hempstead, New York	Denmark	5–0	Tiffeny Milbrett, Michelle Akers, Mia Hamm (3)
July 27	Goodwill Games F	Hempstead, New York	China	2–0	Mia Hamm (2)
August 2	Friendly (Doubleheader with MLS All-Star Game)	Orlando, Floria	Canada	4–0	Debbie Keller (2), Tiffeny Milbrett, Julie Foudy
September 12	USA Cup	Foxboro, Massachusetts	Mexico	9–0	Mia Hamm (2), Kristine Lilly (2), Tiffeny Milbrett, Shannon MacMillan, Joy Fawcett, Tisha Venturini, Debbie Keller
September 18	USA Cup	Rochester, New York	Russia	4–0	Tiffeny Milbrett (2), Mia Hamm (2)
September 20	USA Cup	Richmond, Virginia	Brazil	3–0	Joy Fawcett, Michelle Akers, Debbie Keller
December 16	Friendly	Los Angeles, California	Ukraine	2–1	Natalie Neaton, Justi Baumgardt
December 20	Friendly	Fresno, California	Ukraine	5–0	Tiffeny Milbrett, Julie Foudy,(3) Debbie Keller

=== 1999 ===
Date	Competition	Location	Opponent	Score	US scorers	Note
January 27	Friendly	Orlando, Florida	Portugal	7–0	Brandi Chastain, Kristine Lilly (3), Michelle Akers, Mia Hamm, Shannon MacMillan	Played behind closed doors
January 30	Friendly	Fort Lauderdale, Florida	Portugal	6–0	Kristine Lilly (2), Michelle Akers, Danielle Fotopoulos, Mia Hamm, Shannon MacMillan	
February 24	Friendly	Orlando, Florida	Finland	3–1	Jenn Grubb, Samantha Baggett, Beth Keller	Played behind closed doors
February 27	Friendly	Tampa, Florida	Finland	2–0	Joy Fawcett, Mia Hamm	
March 14	Algarve Cup	Silves, Portugal	Sweden	1–1	Tiffeny Milbrett	
March 16	Algarve Cup	Quateira, Portugal	Finland	4–0	Tiffeny Milbrett (2), Cindy Parlow, Brandi Chastain	
March 18	Algarve Cup	Albufeira, Portugal	Norway	2–1	Julie Foudy, Kristine Lilly	
March 20	Algarve Cup final	Loulé, Portugal	China	1–2	Tiffeny Millbrett	
March 28	Friendly	Pasadena, California	Mexico	3–0	Julie Foudy, Kristine Lilly (2)	
April 22	Friendly	Hershey, Pennsylvania	China	2–1	Michelle Akers (PK), Tisha Venturini	
April 25	Friendly	East Rutherford, New Jersey	China	1–2	Julie Foudy	
April 29	Friendly	Charlotte, North Carolina	Japan	9–0	Michelle Akers (2), Cindy Parlow, Tiffeny Milbrett (4), Aly Wagner, Tisha Venturini	
May 2	Friendly	Clarkston, Georgia	Japan	7–0	Shannon MacMillan (2), Mia Hamm, Danielle Fotopoulos (2), Sara Whalen, Tisha Venturini	
May 13	Friendly	Milwaukee, Wisconsin	Netherlands	5–0	Tiffeny Milbrett, Cindy Parlow, Kristine Lilly, Mia Hamm, Shannon MacMillan	
May 16	Friendly	Chicago, Illinois	Netherlands	3–0	Brandi Chastain (2), Mia Hamm	
May 22	Friendly	Orlando, Florida	Brazil	3–0	Mia Hamm, Kristine Lilly, Tiffeny Milbrett	
June 3	Friendly	Beaverton, Oregon	Australia	4–0	Danielle Fotopoulos, Cindy Parlow, Kristine Lilly, Tiffeny Milbrett	Played behind closed doors
June 6	Friendly	Portland, Oregon	Canada	4–2	Mia Hamm, Tiffeny Milbrett, Kristine Lilly, Cindy Parlow	
June 19	Women's World Cup	East Rutherford, New Jersey	Denmark	3–0	Mia Hamm, Julie Foudy, Kristine Lilly	
June 24	Women's World Cup	Chicago, Illinois	Nigeria	7–1	Michelle Akers, Mia Hamm, Tiffeny Milbrett (2), Kristine Lilly, Cindy Parlow, own goal	
June 27	Women's World Cup	Foxboro, Massachusetts	North Korea	3–0	Shannon MacMillan, Tisha Venturini (2)	
July 1	Women's World Cup QF	Landover, Maryland	Germany	3–2	Brandi Chastain, Tiffeny Milbrett, Joy Fawcett	
July 4	Women's World Cup SF	Palo Alto, California	Brazil	2–0	Cindy Parlow, Michelle Akers (PK)	
July 10	Women's World Cup final	Pasadena, California	China	0(5)–0(4)	n/a	
September 4	Friendly	Foxboro, Massachusetts	Ireland	5–0	Tiffeny Milbrett (2), Julie Foudy, Joy Fawcett, Kristine Lilly	
September 26	Friendly	Denver, Colorado	Brazil	6–0	Tiffeny Milbrett (2), Shannon MacMillan (2), Cindy Parlow, Danielle Fotopoulos	
October 3	Friendly	Columbus, Ohio	Korea	5–0	Cindy Parlow, Mia Hamm, Tiffeny Milbrett, Danielle Fotopoulos (2)	
October 7	Friendly	Kansas City, Missouri	Finland	6–0	Tiffeny Milbrett, Joy Fawcett, Sara Whalen, Kristine Lilly (2), Own Goal	
October 10	Friendly	Louisville, Kentucky	Brazil	4–2	Mia Hamm (2), Kristine Lilly (2)	
