= United States at the FIFA Women's World Cup =

Performance of United States in soccer tournament

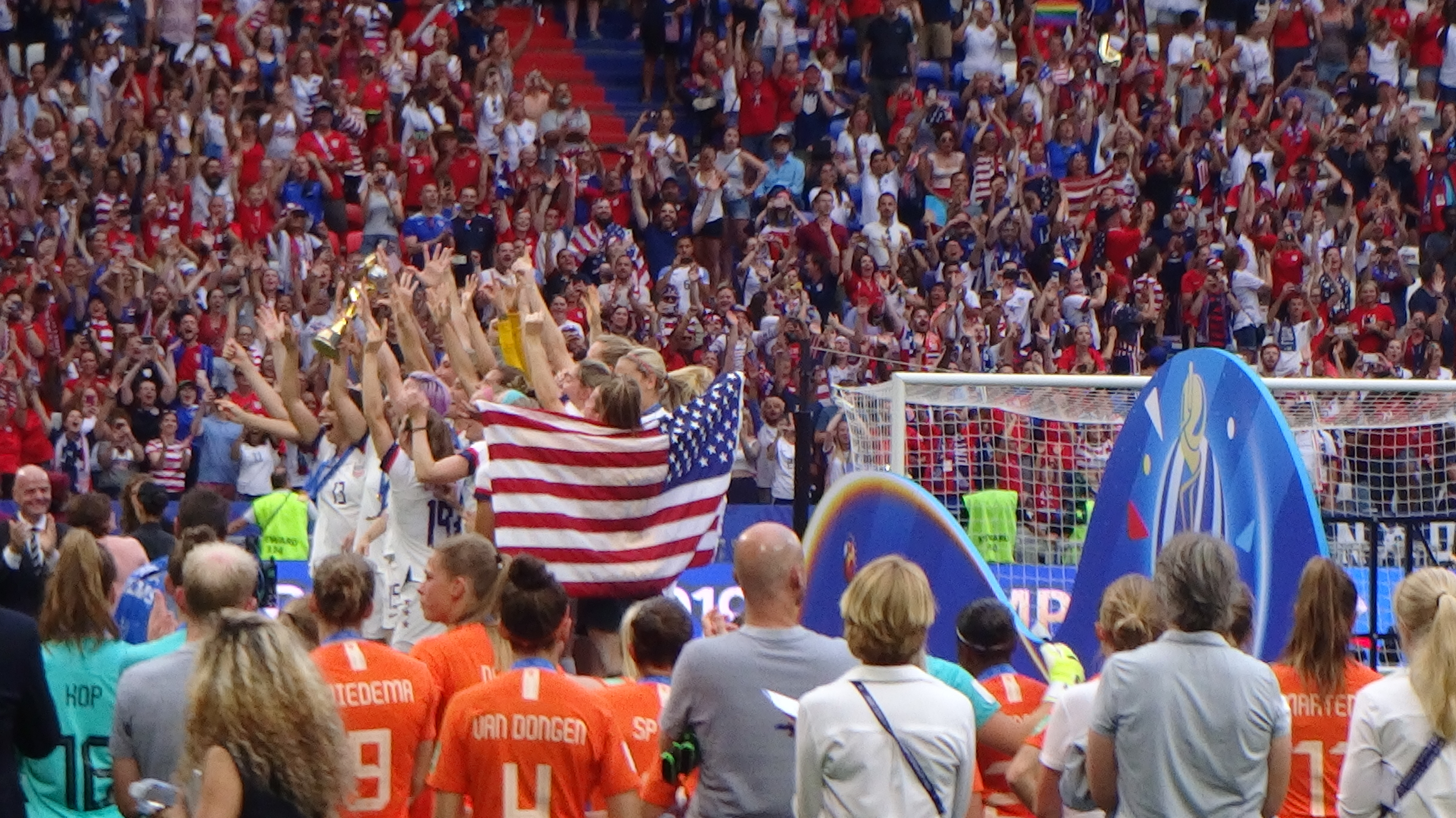
The United States team lifted their 4th championship trophy in 2019

The United States women's national soccer team is the most successful women's national team in the history of the Women's World Cup, having won four titles, earning second-place once and third-place finishes three times. The United States is one of five countries including Germany, Japan, Norway, and Spain to win a FIFA Women's World Cup. (The United States won in China in 1991, in the United States in 1999, in Canada in 2015, and in France in 2019). The United States was also the only team that played the maximum number of matches possible in every tournament until they got eliminated by the eventual third-place winner Sweden in the round of 16 in 2023.

== 1991 World Cup ==
Lineups in the first women's World Cup final

For the first World Cup Women's Championship, the United States qualified as the North and Central America Qualifications. At a tournament in Port-au-Prince, Haiti's capital, they met in the first round Trinidad and Tobago, Mexico, and Martinique (who, as a non-FIFA member, could not qualify for the World Cup). The U.S. prevailed with three wins, scoring 34–0 goals. In the semifinals, hosts Haiti were defeated 10–0 in the final Canada, which also reached the final without conceding, 5–0. Thus, the U.S. qualified as the only CONCACAF representative for the World Cup finals.

In China, the team met Sweden, Brazil, and Japan in the group stage. On November 17, 1991, they played in Panyu their first World Cup match and won against Sweden 3–2. Carin Jennings scored the first two World Cup goals for the United States. After a 5–0 win over Brazil and a 3–0 win over Japan, the group winners reached the quarter-finals. This was followed by a 7–0 victory over the Republic of China and a 5–2 draw against Germany in the semifinals, Carin Jennings led the US with a "flawless" hat-trick. In the final then vice-European Champion Norway was the opponent and here it was Michelle Akers, who secured the 2–1 victory with two goals and was also the top scorer with a total of 10 goals. Carin Jennings was awarded the Golden Ball for Best Player of the Tournament.

Pos	Team	Pld	W	D	L	GF	GA	GD	Pts	Qualification
1	United States	3	3	0	0	11	2	+9	6	Advance to knockout stage
2	Sweden	3	2	0	1	12	3	+9	4	Advance to knockout stage
3	Brazil	3	1	0	2	1	7	−6	2	
4	Japan	3	0	0	3	0	12	−12	0	

Source: FIFA
17 November 1991
19:45

Sweden	2–3	United States
Videkull 65'; I. Johansson 71'	Report	Jennings 40', 49'; Hamm 62'

Ying Tung Stadium, Guangzhou
Attendance: 14,000
Referee: John Toro Rendón (Colombia)

19 November 1991
19:45

Brazil	0–5	United States
	Report	Heinrichs 23', 35'; Jennings 38'; Akers-Stahl 39'; Hamm 63'

Ying Tung Stadium, Guangzhou
Attendance: 15,500
Referee: Vadim Zhuk (Soviet Union)

21 November 1991
15:30

Japan	0–3	United States
	Report	Akers-Stahl 20', 37'; Gebauer 39'

New Plaza Stadium, Foshan
Attendance: 14,000
Referee: John Toro Rendón (Colombia)

=== Quarter-finals ===
24 November 1991
19:45

United States	7–0	Chinese Taipei
Akers-Stahl 8', 29', 33', 44' (pen.), 48'; Foudy 38'; Biefeld 79'	Report

New Plaza Stadium, Foshan
Attendance: 12,000
Referee: Omer Yengo (Congo)

=== Semi-finals ===
27 November 1991
19:45

Germany	2–5	United States
Mohr 34'; Wiegmann 63'	Report	Jennings 10', 22', 33'; Heinrichs 54', 75'

Guangdong Provincial Stadium, Guangzhou
Attendance: 15,000
Referee: Salvador Imperatore (Chile)

=== Final ===
30 November 1991
19:45

Norway	1–2	United States
Medalen 29'	Report	Akers-Stahl 20', 78'

Tianhe Stadium, Guangzhou
Attendance: 63,000
Referee: Vadim Zhuk (Soviet Union)

== 1995 World Cup ==
Unlike the men's World Cup, where the defending champion was automatically qualified until 2002, the defending champion had to qualify for the women's second World Cup. In the Qualification Tournament in Montreal, the U.S. impressively scored four wins and 34 goals and 1 conceded. Opponents were Canada, who also finished second as the CONCACAF teams now have two starting slots, Mexico, Trinidad and Tobago and Jamaica.

In Sweden, in the first group match, the United States faced People's Republic of China and played to a 3–3 draw. The second game was a 2–0 victory over Denmark and the final group game was a 4–1 victory over Australia. Both the U.S. and China had a 2–1 record, but the U.S. were group winners by virtue of the better goal difference. In the quarterfinals, the U.S. met Japan and won 4–0, setting up a semifinal match with Norway that was a rematch of the previous World Cup final. This time, the Norwegians prevailed, winning the game 1–0 and going on to win the final match. This was the first World Cup loss for the United States. In the match for third place, the U.S. played China again and this time won 2–0.

=== Group C ===
Pos	Team	Pld	W	D	L	GF	GA	GD	Pts	Qualification
1	United States	3	2	1	0	9	4	+5	7	Advance to knockout stage
2	China	3	2	1	0	10	6	+4	7	Advance to knockout stage
3	Denmark	3	1	0	2	6	5	+1	3	Advance to knockout stage
4	Australia	3	0	0	3	3	13	−10	0	

Source: FIFA
6 June 1995
19:00

United States	3–3	China
Venturini 22'; Milbrett 34'; Hamm 51'	Report	Wang Liping 38'; Wei Haiying 74'; Sun Wen 79'

Strömvallen, Gävle
Attendance: 4,635
Referee: Ingrid Jonsson (Sweden)

8 June 1995
19:00

United States	2–0	Denmark
Lilly 9'; Milbrett 49'	Report

Strömvallen, Gävle
Attendance: 2,704
Referee: Engage Camara (Guinea)

10 June 1995
16:00

United States	4–1	Australia
Foudy 69'; Fawcett 72'; Overbeck 90+2' (pen.); Keller 90+4'	Report	Casagrande 54'

Olympia, Helsingborg
Attendance: 1,105
Referee: Pirom Un-prasert (Thailand)

=== Quarter-finals ===
13 June 1995
17:15

Japan	0–4	United States
	Report	Lilly 8', 42'; Milbrett 45'; Venturini 80'

Strömvallen, Gävle
Attendance: 3,756
Referee: Eduardo Gamboa (Chile)

=== Semi-finals ===
15 June 1995
17:15

United States	0–1	Norway
	Report	Aarønes 10'

Arosvallen, Västerås
Attendance: 2,893
Referee: Alain Hamer (Luxembourg)

=== Third place play-off ===
17 June 1995
16:00

China	0–2	United States
	Report	Venturini 24'; Hamm 55'

Strömvallen, Gävle
Attendance: 4,335
Referee: Sonia Denoncourt (Canada)

== 1999 World Cup ==
For the third World Cup, the United States qualified as host. In 1996, the United States had won the first women's football tournament in the Olympic Games and was therefore a favorite for the World Cup title. They also lived up to their role in the first games. In the first group match they met Denmark and won 3–0. In the second match, Nigeria was defeated 7-1 and in the third match Korea DPR 3–0. In the quarter-finals, European Champion Germany was defeated 3–2 and Brazil was defeated in the semi-final 2–0. The final in Los Angeles against China then took place in front of a record crowd of 90,185 spectators. No women's football match recognized by FIFA had attracted more spectators.

The final match was the first scoreless one, and after 120 minutes it went to a penalty shootout for the first time. While all five U.S. shooters were successful, Liu Ying couldn't get the ball past Briana Scurry. Brandi Chastain, after being the last shooter to succeed, pulled off her jersey and knelt in her black sports bra on the field, exulting in the U.S. victory.

=== Group A ===
Pos	Team	Pld	W	D	L	GF	GA	GD	Pts	Qualification
1	United States (H)	3	3	0	0	13	1	+12	9	Advance to knockout stage
2	Nigeria	3	2	0	1	5	8	−3	6	Advance to knockout stage
3	North Korea	3	1	0	2	4	6	−2	3	
4	Denmark	3	0	0	3	1	8	−7	0	

Source: FIFA
(H) Hosts
June 19, 1999
15:00 EDT (UTC−4)

United States	3–0	Denmark
Hamm 17'; Foudy 73'; Lilly 89'	Report

Giants Stadium, East Rutherford
Attendance: 78,972
Referee: Sonia Denoncourt (Canada)

June 24, 1999
19:00 CDT (UTC−5)

United States	7–1	Nigeria
I. Chiejine 19' (o.g.); Hamm 20'; Milbrett 23', 83'; Lilly 32'; Akers 39'; Parlow 42'	Report	Okosieme 2'

Soldier Field, Chicago
Attendance: 65,080
Referee: Nicole Petignat (Switzerland)

June 27, 1999
19:00 EDT (UTC−4)

United States	3–0	North Korea
MacMillan 56'; Venturini 68', 76'	Report

Foxboro Stadium, Foxborough
Attendance: 50,484
Referee: Katriina Elovirta (Finland)

=== Quarter-finals ===
July 1, 1999
19:00 EDT (UTC−4)

United States	3–2	Germany
Milbrett 16'; Chastain 49'; Fawcett 66'	Report	Chastain 5' (o.g.); Wiegmann 45+1'

Jack Kent Cooke Stadium, Landover
Attendance: 54,642
Referee: Martha Liliana Pardo (Colombia)

=== Semi-finals ===
July 4, 1999
13:30 PDT (UTC−7)

United States	2–0	Brazil
Parlow 5'; Akers 80' (pen.)	Report

Stanford Stadium, Stanford
Attendance: 73,123
Referee: Katriina Elovirta (Finland)

=== Final ===
July 10, 1999
12:50 PDT (UTC−7)

United States	0–0 (a.e.t.)	China
	Report
Penalties
Overbeck (penalty scored); Fawcett (penalty scored); Lilly (penalty scored); Hamm (penalty scored); Chastain (penalty scored)	5–4	(penalty scored) Xie Huilin; (penalty scored) Qiu Haiyan; (penalty missed) Liu Ying; (penalty scored) Zhang Ouying; (penalty scored) Sun Wen

Rose Bowl, Pasadena
Attendance: 90,185
Referee: Nicole Petignat (Switzerland)

== 2003 World Cup ==
The 2003 World Cup was originally to take place again in China PR. Due to the SARS epidemic, the tournament was temporarily relocated to the United States. Thus, the World Cup took place for the second time in the United States, making the U.S. the only nation to host two consecutive World Cup tournaments. As hosts, the U.S. were again automatically qualified, but they still took part in the qualifying 2002 CONCACAF Women's Gold Cup, which they won with a Golden goal 2–1 against Canada. With this victory in the finals, they would have automatically qualified for the World Cup.

In the group stage of the World Cup they met Sweden in the first game and won 3–1. This was followed by a 5–0 win against Africa Champion Nigeria and a 3–0 win over North Korea. As a group winner, the United States then met Norway and won 1–0. In one of the best women's World Cup games, they then lost in the semi-final against Germany 0–3, the last two goals coming in stoppage time. In the match for 3rd place, Canada was defeated 3–1. Germany won their first World Cup title with a Golden goal by Nia Künzer in the final.

=== Group A ===
Pos	Team	Pld	W	D	L	GF	GA	GD	Pts	Qualification
1	United States (H)	3	3	0	0	11	1	+10	9	Advance to knockout stage
2	Sweden	3	2	0	1	5	3	+2	6	Advance to knockout stage
3	North Korea	3	1	0	2	3	4	−1	3	
4	Nigeria	3	0	0	3	0	11	−11	0	

Source: FIFA
(H) Hosts
September 21, 2003
12:30 EDT (UTC−4)

United States	3–1	Sweden
Lilly 27'; Parlow 36'; Boxx 78'	Report	Svensson 58'

Robert F. Kennedy Memorial Stadium, Washington, D.C.
Attendance: 34,144
Referee: Zhang Dongqing (China PR)

September 25, 2003
19:30 EDT (UTC−4)

United States	5–0	Nigeria
Hamm 6' (pen.), 12'; Parlow 47'; Wambach 65'; Foudy 89' (pen.)	Report

Lincoln Financial Field, Philadelphia
Attendance: 31,553
Referee: Florencia Romano (Argentina)

September 28, 2003
15:45 EDT (UTC−4)

North Korea	0–3	United States
	Report	Wambach 17' (pen.); Reddick 48', 66'

Columbus Crew Stadium, Columbus
Attendance: 22,828
Referee: Sueli Tortura (Brazil)

=== Quarter-finals ===
October 1, 2003
19:30 EDT (UTC−4)

United States	1–0	Norway
Wambach 24'	Report

Gillette Stadium, Foxborough
Attendance: 25,103
Referee: Nicole Petignat (Switzerland)

=== Semi-finals ===
October 5, 2003
16:30 PDT (UTC−7)

United States	0–3	Germany
	Report	Garefrekes 15'; Meinert 90+1'; Prinz 90+3'

PGE Park, Portland
Attendance: 27,623
Referee: Sonia Denoncourt (Canada)

=== Third place play-off ===
October 11, 2003
12:30 PDT (UTC−7)

United States	3–1	Canada
Lilly 22'; Boxx 51'; Milbrett 80'	Report	Sinclair 38'

Home Depot Center, Carson
Attendance: 25,253
Referee: Tammy Ogston (Australia)

== 2007 World Cup ==
In 2007, the World Cup took place for the second time in the People's Republic of China. The CONCACAF Women's Gold Cup 2006 again served as a qualifier, with the U.S. only having to intervene in the semifinals. With a 2–0 win against Mexico, they qualified for the World Cup and the final. They won 2–1 against Canada, as they had four years earlier, but only by a foul penalty in the 120th minute.

The U.S. traveled to the World Cup as Olympic Champions. In China, they had the same preliminary round opponents as four years earlier, but started with a 2–2 draw against North Korea. A 2–0 victory over Sweden was followed by a defeat of Nigeria 1–0, on a goal by Lori Chalupny in the first minute against the Africa Champion. The quarter-final against England was won 3–0, with all three goals coming in the second half. Coach Greg Ryan replaced Hope Solo with Briana Scurry, the only goalkeeper in the past 10 World Cup matches, for the semifinals against Brazil which the U.S. lost 0–4. Solo accused the coach in an interview to have made a mistake with the change, saying she herself could have prevented the goal-scoring. Although Solo apologized a little later for her remarks, she was not used in the match for third place, which was won against Norway 4–1, nor did she join the team on the journey home. Solo was only appointed back into the squad of the U.S. national team in early 2008 by coach Pia Sundhage. Semi-final winner Brazil then lost in the final to defending champion Germany, who succeeded as the first team in women's soccer to defend their title, and the first team to not concede a goal in the World Cup.

=== Group B ===
Pos	Team	Pld	W	D	L	GF	GA	GD	Pts	Qualification
1	United States	3	2	1	0	5	2	+3	7	Advance to knockout stage
2	North Korea	3	1	1	1	5	4	+1	4	Advance to knockout stage
3	Sweden	3	1	1	1	3	4	−1	4	
4	Nigeria	3	0	1	2	1	4	−3	1	

Source: FIFA

The four teams were also paired in the same group in 2003.

11 September 2007
17:00

United States	2–2	North Korea
Wambach 50'; O'Reilly 69'	Report	Kil Son-hui 58'; Kim Yong-ae 62'

Chengdu Sports Centre Stadium, Chengdu
Attendance: 35,100
Referee: Nicole Petignat (Switzerland)

14 September 2007
17:00

Sweden	0–2	United States
	Report	Wambach 34' (pen.), 58'

Chengdu Sports Centre Stadium, Chengdu
Attendance: 35,600
Referee: Gyöngyi Gaál (Hungary)

18 September 2007
20:00

Nigeria	0–1	United States
	Report	Chalupny 1'

Hongkou Football Stadium, Shanghai
Attendance: 6,100
Referee: Mayumi Oiwa (Japan)

=== Quarter-finals ===
22 September 2007
20:00

United States	3–0	England
Wambach 48'; Boxx 57'; Lilly 60'	Report

Tianjin Olympic Center Stadium, Tianjin
Attendance: 29,586
Referee: Jenny Palmqvist (Sweden)

=== Semi-finals ===
27 September 2007
20:00

United States	0–4	Brazil
	Report	Osborne 20' (o.g.); Marta 27', 79'; Cristiane 56'

Yellow Dragon Stadium, Hangzhou
Attendance: 47,818
Referee: Nicole Petignat (Switzerland)

=== Third place play-off ===
30 September 2007
17:00

Norway	1–4	United States
R. Gulbrandsen 63'	Report	Wambach 30', 46'; Chalupny 58'; O'Reilly 59'

Hongkou Football Stadium, Shanghai
Attendance: 31,000
Referee: Gyöngyi Gaál (Hungary)

== 2011 World Cup ==
Lineups in Final

For the World Cup in Germany, the U.S. qualified only by the detour of the intercontinental playoffs. Previously, in the 2010 CONCACAF Women's World Cup Qualifying, which again served as a qualifier, the US won the preliminary round with three wins against Haiti (5: 0), Guatemala (9: 0) and Costa Rica (4: 0). But then a game was lost in the Gold Cup with a 1–2 defeat by Mexico in the semi-final. Although victorious in the third-place match against Costa Rica by a score of 3–0, this was not sufficient for direct qualification. Instead, two games against Italy had to be contested, both of which were won 1–0 (aggregate 2–0) in favor of the United States.

The U.S. team traveled to Germany again as Olympic Champions. In the group stage, as in the two previous tournaments North Korea and Sweden were again the opponents, and also World Cup newcomer Colombia. For the first time, the U.S. team was coached by a foreigner, the Swedish Pia Sundhage, who had previously led the U.S. team in 2008 for their third Olympic victory. After two wins against North Korea (2–0) and Colombia (3–0), the United States lost to Sweden 2–1. Thus, the United States were only second in the group standings and met South America Champion Brazil in the quarterfinals. The U.S. took the lead in the second minute with Daiane's own goal, but had to settle for a penalty kick in the 68th minute when Marta converted the penalty. The Brazilians were fortunate, though Hope Solo held the first penalty from Cristiane Rozeira, but referee Jacqui Melksham let them repeat because one U.S. player had run into the penalty area too early. On the second attempt Marta was ultimately successful. In addition, the U.S. was now outnumbered, as Rachel Buehler had been given a [red card]. The score remained until the end of regular time at 1–1, which forced an extension. In this Marta scored after just two minutes, giving Brazil a 2–1 lead. In the second minute of extra time, Abby Wambach managed a 2–2 equalizer after a long Megan Rapinoe cross.

The semifinal match was against France, in their first World Cup appearance, and the U.S. won 3-1 moving them for the third time into the final. This game pitted the U.S. against Japan, who had won their first-ever victory in the quarter-finals with a surprising victory against the hosts (and two-time defending champions) Germany. The United States had never lost to Japan before and were therefore a favorite. After a goalless first half, Alex Morgan made it 1–0 in the 69th minute. Japan was able to equalize in the 81st minute, which forced an extension. Again, the Americans took the lead; Homare Sawa, however, scored three minutes from the end of extra time with her fifth tournament goal, making her the top scorer of the tournament. In stoppage time Azusa Iwashimizu received the red card because of an emergency brake, but it remained at 2–2, so that for the second time the penalty shoot-out had to decide the world title. Although Japanese goalkeeper Ayumi Kaihori was only 170 centimeters tall, she held two penalties against the U.S., and also Carli Lloyd shot over the goal, while three Japanese women turned and only one failed. Japan thus became the first football world champions from Asia.

=== Group C ===
Pos	Team	Pld	W	D	L	GF	GA	GD	Pts	Qualification
1	Sweden	3	3	0	0	4	1	+3	9	Advance to knockout stage
2	United States	3	2	0	1	6	2	+4	6	Advance to knockout stage
3	North Korea	3	0	1	2	0	3	−3	1	
4	Colombia	3	0	1	2	0	4	−4	1	

Source: FIFA
28 June 2011
18:15

United States	2–0	North Korea
Cheney 54'; Buehler 76'	Report

Rudolf-Harbig-Stadion, Dresden
Attendance: 21,859
Referee: Bibiana Steinhaus (Germany)

2 July 2011
18:00

United States	3–0	Colombia
O'Reilly 12'; Rapinoe 50'; Lloyd 57'	Report

Rhein-Neckar-Arena, Sinsheim
Attendance: 25,475
Referee: Dagmar Damková (Czech Republic)

6 July 2011
20:45

Sweden	2–1	United States
Dahlkvist 16' (pen.); LePeilbet 35' (o.g.)	Report	Wambach 67'

Volkswagen Arena, Wolfsburg
Attendance: 23,468
Referee: Etsuko Fukano (Japan)

=== Quarter-finals ===
10 July 2011
17:30

Brazil	2–2 (a.e.t.)	United States
Marta 68' (pen.), 92'	Report	Daiane 2' (o.g.); Wambach 120+2'
Penalties
Cristiane (penalty scored); Marta (penalty scored); Daiane (penalty missed); Francielle (penalty scored)	3–5	(penalty scored) Boxx; (penalty scored) Lloyd; (penalty scored) Wambach; (penalty scored) Rapinoe; (penalty scored) Krieger

Rudolf-Harbig-Stadion, Dresden
Attendance: 25,598
Referee: Jacqui Melksham (Australia)

=== Semi-finals ===
13 July 2011
18:00

France	1–3	United States
Bompastor 55'	Report	Cheney 9'; Wambach 79'; Morgan 82'

Borussia-Park, Mönchengladbach
Attendance: 25,676
Referee: Kirsi Heikkinen (Finland)

=== Final ===
17 July 2011
20:45

Japan	2–2 (a.e.t.)	United States
Miyama 81'; Sawa 117'	Report	Morgan 69'; Wambach 104'
Penalties
Miyama (penalty scored); Nagasato (penalty missed); Sakaguchi (penalty scored); Kumagai (penalty scored)	3–1	(penalty missed) Boxx; (penalty missed) Lloyd; (penalty missed) Heath; (penalty scored) Wambach

Waldstadion, Frankfurt
Attendance: 48,817
Referee: Bibiana Steinhaus (Germany)

== 2015 World Cup ==
Start positions in the final

In the Qualification, which was again hosted by the CONCACAF Women's Gold Cup 2014, the U.S. was again the winner. In the first round, the first game against Trinidad and Tobago was a narrow 1–0 victory; the next two matches were more decisive, with defeats of Guatemala and Haiti (5–0 and 6–0). In the semi-final, the U.S. had a 3–0 win over Mexico, and with the 6–0 win over Costa Rica in the final, the U.S. exceeded their own 1991 record for goals in a final.

The U.S. group included Nigeria, Sweden and Australia. The group was considered the most balanced of the World Cup; it was the only one with four teams that at least reached the semi-finals in their last continental championship matches.

For the World Cup, the United States traveled again as Olympic Champions. In the first game, the U.S. women won 3–1 against lively Australians, followed by a goalless draw against Sweden and in the last group match, Nigeria, Abby Wambach, who scored her final goal, secured the 1–0 victory over the Africa champion with her 14th goal. In the round of 16 against Colombia, Wambach missed her penalty kick, but her teammates Alex Morgan and Carli Lloyd (penalties) scored to secure the entry into the quarter-finals.

In the quarter-final match, the U.S. dominated the game but missed many chances while the Chinese shot only once on the U.S. goal in the whole game. As in 1999, the game went without goals in the second half, but six minutes after the restart Carli Lloyd scored to ensure a 1–0 victory in their 200th international match. In the semifinals, the two two-time World Champions United States and Germany met, and the U.S. prevailed with 2–0 to become the first team to reached the finals for the fourth time. The final match was a repeat of 2011 against Japan, who had reached the finals with six wins. In this game Christie Rampone became the oldest World Cup player in history. After just five minutes, the U.S. led 2–0, after 16 minutes it was 4–0, so the game was virtually decided. Japan was able to score once in the first half, and shortly after the break the U.S. helped them with an own goal, but quickly recovered to score another insurance goal, for a final score of 5–2. The United States became the first team to win a third World Cup title.

=== Group D ===
Pos	Team	Pld	W	D	L	GF	GA	GD	Pts	Qualification
1	United States	3	2	1	0	4	1	+3	7	Advance to knockout stage
2	Australia	3	1	1	1	4	4	0	4	Advance to knockout stage
3	Sweden	3	0	3	0	4	4	0	3	Advance to knockout stage
4	Nigeria	3	0	1	2	3	6	−3	1	

Source: FIFA
8 June 2015
18:30 CDT (UTC−5)

United States	3–1	Australia
Rapinoe 12', 78'; Press 61'	Report	De Vanna 27'

Investors Group Field, Winnipeg
Attendance: 31,148
Referee: Claudia Umpiérrez (Uruguay)

12 June 2015
19:00 CDT (UTC−5)

United States	0–0	Sweden
	Report

Investors Group Field, Winnipeg
Attendance: 32,716
Referee: Sachiko Yamagishi (Japan)

16 June 2015
17:00 PDT (UTC−7)

Nigeria	0–1	United States
	Report	Wambach 45'

BC Place, Vancouver
Attendance: 52,193
Referee: Kateryna Monzul (Ukraine)

=== Round of 16 ===
22 June 2015
18:00 MDT (UTC−6)

United States	2–0	Colombia
Morgan 53'; Lloyd 66' (pen.)	Report

Commonwealth Stadium, Edmonton
Attendance: 19,412
Referee: Stéphanie Frappart (France)

=== Quarter-finals ===
26 June 2015
19:30 EDT (UTC−4)

China	0–1	United States
	Report	Lloyd 51'

TD Place Stadium, Ottawa
Attendance: 24,141
Referee: Carina Vitulano (Italy)

=== Semi-finals ===
30 June 2015
19:00 EDT (UTC−4)

United States	2–0	Germany
Lloyd 69' (pen.); O'Hara 84'	Report

Olympic Stadium, Montreal
Attendance: 51,176
Referee: Teodora Albon (Romania)

=== Final ===
5 July 2015
16:00 PDT (UTC−7)

United States	5–2	Japan
Lloyd 3', 5', 16'; Holiday 14'; Heath 54'	Report	Ōgimi 27'; Johnston 52' (o.g.)

BC Place, Vancouver
Attendance: 53,341
Referee: Kateryna Monzul (Ukraine)

== 2019 World Cup ==
Start positions in the final

In the Qualification, which was again hosted by CONCACAF Women's Gold Cup 2018, the U.S. qualified to reach the finals. In the preliminary round, the first game against Mexico was won 6–0, then Panama and Trinidad and Tobago were beaten just as clearly (5–0 and 7–0). In the semifinals, the U.S. won a 6–0 game against Jamaica, and in the final a 2–0 victory against Canada.

At the World Cup, the Americans won their first match with a 13–0 record victory against Thailand, with Alex Morgan being the second player to score five goals in one match, and the team scoring a total of 10 goals in the second half. They won 3–0 against World Cup debutant Chile, scoring all three goals in the first half. In the last group game they met Sweden for the sixth time in a World Cup group match and won 2–0. As Group F winners, the Americans advanced to the round of 16 against Spain, who reached the knockout round for the first time at their second World Cup. Two penalties were converted by Megan Rapinoe as the U.S. won 2–1. In the quarter-finals they met France and thus for the first time in a World Cup, they played a match against the hosts. They again won 2–1, with Rapinoe again scoring twice. Thus, the U.S. met England in the semifinals, and achieved another 2–1 win. Goalkeeper Alyssa Naeher secured the victory by saving a penalty shot in the 84th minute. Their title was defended in the final with a 2–0 victory against European champions the Netherlands, giving the United States a record fourth World Cup title.

=== Group F ===
Pos	Team	Pld	W	D	L	GF	GA	GD	Pts	Qualification
1	United States	3	3	0	0	18	0	+18	9	Advance to knockout stage
2	Sweden	3	2	0	1	7	3	+4	6	Advance to knockout stage
3	Chile	3	1	0	2	2	5	−3	3	
4	Thailand	3	0	0	3	1	20	−19	0	

Source: FIFA
11 June 2019
21:00

United States	13–0	Thailand
Morgan 12', 53', 74', 81', 87'; Lavelle 20', 56'; Horan 32'; Mewis 50', 54'; Rapinoe 79'; Pugh 85'; Lloyd 90+2'	Report

Stade Auguste-Delaune, Reims
Attendance: 18,591
Referee: Laura Fortunato (Argentina)

16 June 2019
18:00

United States	3–0	Chile
Lloyd 11', 35'; Ertz 26'	Report

Parc des Princes, Paris
Attendance: 45,594
Referee: Riem Hussein (Germany)

20 June 2019
21:00

Sweden	0–2	United States
	Report	Horan 3'; Andersson 50' (o.g.)

Stade Océane, Le Havre
Attendance: 22,418
Referee: Anastasia Pustovoitova (Russia)

=== Round of 16 ===
24 June 2019
18:00

Spain	1–2	United States
Hermoso 9'	Report	Rapinoe 7' (pen.), 75' (pen.)

Stade Auguste-Delaune, Reims
Attendance: 19,633
Referee: Katalin Kulcsár (Hungary)

=== Quarter-finals ===
28 June 2019
21:00

France	1–2	United States
Renard 81'	Report	Rapinoe 5', 65'

Parc des Princes, Paris
Attendance: 45,595
Referee: Kateryna Monzul (Ukraine)

=== Semi-finals ===
2 July 2019
21:00

England	1–2	United States
White 19'	Report	Press 10'; Morgan 31'

Parc Olympique Lyonnais, Décines-Charpieu
Attendance: 53,512
Referee: Edina Alves Batista (Brazil)

=== Final ===
7 July 2019
17:00

United States	2–0	Netherlands
Rapinoe 61' (pen.); Lavelle 69'	Report

Parc Olympique Lyonnais, Décines-Charpieu
Attendance: 57,900
Referee: Stéphanie Frappart (France)

== 2023 World Cup ==
Following the 2019 World Cup, head coach Jill Ellis was replaced by Macedonian Vlatko Andonovski, who would be attempting to lead the U.S. to an unprecedented third consecutive World Cup title. The 2023 Women's World Cup saw Australia and New Zealand become the first 2 nations to co-host a Women's World Cup, and also featured an expanded field, increasing from 24 to 32 teams. Qualification was determined by the 2022 CONCACAF W Championship, which was held in Mexico. The U.S. defeated each of its group stage opponents: Haiti, Jamaica, and the hosts, securing direct qualification to the World Cup. They then went on to defeat Costa Rica in the semifinals, and a 1–0 defeat of reigning Olympic gold medalists Canada in the final clinched them direct qualification to the Paris 2024 Olympic Games.

At the World Cup, the U.S. was drawn into Group E, meaning all of their group stage matches would be played in New Zealand. In their first match against debutants Vietnam, a first half brace by Sophia Smith along with a second half goal by Lindsey Horan ensured a comprehensive 3–0 victory, with Vietnam failing to record a single shot against a stout U.S. defense. Game 2 was a rematch of the previous World Cup final as the U.S. faced the Netherlands. The Americans fell behind early after Jill Roord opened the scoring for the Dutch in the 17th minute, but the U.S. equalized in the second half after Horan scored from a header off a corner kick. The game would finish in a 1–1 draw. The third and final group stage game came against Portugal, who were also making their Women's World Cup debut. Despite being heavy underdogs, Portugal had the better of the possession for much of the game, limiting the amount of chances created by the U.S. attack. The Americans came within inches of being eliminated in the group stage for the first time in their history when, in the second minute of second half added time, a shot from Portugal's Ana Capeta struck the post but did not go in. A 0–0 draw meant that the U.S. would qualify for the round of 16 as Group E runners-up behind the Netherlands. Their 5-point total was the lowest ever achieved by the U.S. at a Women's World Cup, despite the inaugural 1991 edition only awarding 2 points for a win instead of 3.

In the Round of 16, the U.S. crossed the Tasman Sea to play Group G winners Sweden in Melbourne, where they dominated the run of play, but none of their 12 shots on target could beat Swedish goalkeeper Zecira Musovic, and the game ended goalless after 120 minutes, resulting in a penalty shootout. After the first four rounds of penalties, the U.S. led 3–2. Smith had a chance to send the Americans through to the quarterfinals with the first kick of the fifth round, but sent her effort wide right, allowing Hanna Bennison a chance to send the shootout to sudden death, which she did after converting her spot kick. In the seventh round, with the shootout tied 4–4, Kelley O'Hara struck the post, giving Lina Hurtig an opportunity to win the shootout for Sweden. Her strike was partially saved by U.S. goalkeeper Alyssa Naeher, but the ball continued bouncing toward the goal line. Naeher scrambled back in a desperation attempt to keep the ball out, ultimately parrying it away, but after a suspenseful delay that lasted several seconds, goal-line technology indicated that the ball had indeed crossed the line by a millimeter, giving Sweden the 5–4 shootout victory and eliminating the United States, who achieved their worst-ever World Cup result and left without a medal for the first time.

=== Group E ===
Pos	Team	Pld	W	D	L	GF	GA	GD	Pts	Qualification
1	Netherlands	3	2	1	0	9	1	+8	7	Advance to knockout stage
2	United States	3	1	2	0	4	1	+3	5	Advance to knockout stage
3	Portugal	3	1	1	1	2	1	+1	4	
4	Vietnam	3	0	0	3	0	12	−12	0	

Source: FIFA
Rules for classification: Group stage tiebreakers
22 July 2023
13:00 UTC+12

United States	3–0	Vietnam
Smith 14', 45+7'; Horan 77'	Report

Eden Park, Auckland
Attendance: 41,107
Referee: Bouchra Karboubi (Morocco)

27 July 2023
13:00 UTC+12

United States	1–1	Netherlands
Horan 62'	Report	Roord 17'

Wellington Regional Stadium, Wellington
Attendance: 27,312
Referee: Yoshimi Yamashita (Japan)

1 August 2023
19:00 UTC+12

Portugal	0–0	United States
	Report

Eden Park, Auckland
Attendance: 42,958
Referee: Rebecca Welch (England)

=== Round of 16 ===
6 August 2023
19:00 UTC+10

Sweden	0–0 (a.e.t.)	United States
	Report
Penalties
Rolfö (penalty scored); Rubensson (penalty scored); Björn (penalty missed); Blomqvist (penalty missed); Bennison (penalty scored); Eriksson (penalty scored); Hurtig (penalty scored)	5–4	(penalty scored) Sullivan; (penalty scored) Horan; (penalty scored) Mewis; (penalty missed) Rapinoe; (penalty missed) Smith; (penalty scored) Naeher; (penalty missed) O'Hara

Melbourne Rectangular Stadium, Melbourne
Attendance: 27,706
Referee: Stéphanie Frappart (France)

== 2031 World Cup ==
The 2031 FIFA Women's World Cup is set to be the eleventh edition of the FIFA Women's World Cup. The tournament will be jointly hosted by the United States, Mexico, Costa Rica, and Jamaica. The United States will make their tenth or eleventh appearance and have earned an automatic qualification as co-host.

== FIFA Women's World Cup record ==
The team has participated in every FIFA Women's World Cup through 2023 and failed to reach the semifinals only in 2023.

Year	Result	Matches	Wins	Draws	Losses	GF	GA	Coach
(China) 1991	Champions	6	6	0	0	25	5	Anson Dorrance
(Sweden) 1995	Third Place	6	4	1	1	15	5	Tony DiCicco
(United States) 1999	Champions	6	5	1	0	18	3	Tony DiCicco
(United States) 2003	Third place	6	5	0	1	15	5	April Heinrichs
(China) 2007	Third place	6	4	1	1	12	7	Greg Ryan
(Germany) 2011	Runners-up	6	3	2	1	13	7	Pia Sundhage
(Canada) 2015	Champions	7	6	1	0	14	3	Jill Ellis
(France) 2019	Champions	7	7	0	0	26	3	Jill Ellis
(Australia) (New Zealand) 2023	Round of 16	4	1	3	0	4	1	Vlatko Andonovski
(Brazil) 2027	To be determined							
(Costa Rica) (Jamaica) (Mexico) (United States) 2031	Qualified as co-host							
(United Kingdom) 2035	To be determined							
Total	10/12	54	41	9	4	142	39	

United States's Women's World Cup record
First Match	Sweden 2–3 United States (17 November 1991; Panyu, China)
Biggest Win	United States 13–0 Thailand (11 June 2019; Reims, France)
Biggest Defeat	United States 0–4 Brazil (27 September 2007; Hangzhou, China)
Best Result	Champions in 1991, 1999, 2015 and 2019
Worst Result	Round of 16 in 2023

On July 9, 2016, Hope Solo earned her 100th international shutout, 150th career win, and 197th cap in a friendly game against South Africa at Soldier Field, Chicago, Illinois. This made Solo the first female goalkeeper to achieve 100 shutouts in international competition.

== Head-to-head record ==
Opponent	Pld	W	D	L	GF	GA	GD	Win %
Australia	2	2	0	0	7	2	+5	100.00
Brazil	4	2	1	1	9	6	+3	50.00
Canada	1	1	0	0	3	1	+2	100.00
China	4	2	2	0	6	3	+3	50.00
Chile	1	1	0	0	3	0	+3	100.00
Chinese Taipei	1	1	0	0	7	0	+7	100.00
Colombia	2	2	0	0	5	0	+5	100.00
Denmark	2	2	0	0	5	0	+5	100.00
England	2	2	0	0	5	1	+4	100.00
France	2	2	0	0	5	2	+3	100.00
Germany	4	3	0	1	10	7	+3	75.00
Japan	4	3	1	0	14	4	+10	75.00
Netherlands	2	1	1	0	3	1	+2	50.00
Nigeria	4	4	0	0	14	1	+13	100.00
North Korea	4	3	1	0	10	2	+8	75.00
Norway	4	3	0	1	7	3	+4	75.00
Portugal	1	0	1	0	0	0	+0	0.00
Spain	1	1	0	0	2	1	+1	100.00
Sweden	7	4	2	1	11	5	+6	57.14
Thailand	1	1	0	0	13	0	+13	100.00
Vietnam	1	1	0	0	3	0	+3	100.00
Total	54	41	9	4	142	39	+103	75.93

== Goalscorers ==
Player	Goals	1991	1995	1999	2003	2007	2011	2015	2019	2023
Abby Wambach	14				3	6	4	1		
Michelle Akers	12	10		2						
Carli Lloyd	10						1	6	3	
Alex Morgan	9						2	1	6	
Megan Rapinoe	9						1	2	6	
Mia Hamm	8	2	2	2	2					
Kristine Lilly	8		3	2	2	1				
Tiffeny Milbrett	7		3	3	1					
Carin Jennings	6	6								
Tisha Venturini	5		3	2						
Julie Foudy	4	1	1	1	1					
April Heinrichs	4	4								
Cindy Parlow	4			2	2					
Lindsey Horan	4								2	2
Shannon Boxx	3				2	1				
Joy Fawcett	3	1	1	1						
Lauren Holiday	3						2	1		
Heather O'Reilly	3					2	1			
Rose Lavelle	3								3	
Lori Chalupny	2					2				
Cat Whitehill	2				2					
Sam Mewis	2								2	
Christen Press	2							1	1	
Sophia Smith	2									2
Tobin Heath	1							1		
Brandi Chastain	1			1						
Wendy Gebauer	1	1								
Debbie Keller	1		1							
Shannon MacMillan	1			1						
Kelley O'Hara	1							1		
Mallory Pugh	1								1	
Julie Ertz	1								1	
Carla Overbeck	1		1							
Rachel Van Hollebeke	1						1			
Own goals	3			1			1		1	
Total	142	25	15	18	15	12	13	14	26	4

Own goals scored for opponents

- Brandi Chastain (scored for Germany in 1999)
- Leslie Osborne (scored for Brazil in 2007)
- Julie Johnston (scored for Japan in 2015)
