= 1991 FIFA Women's World Cup final =

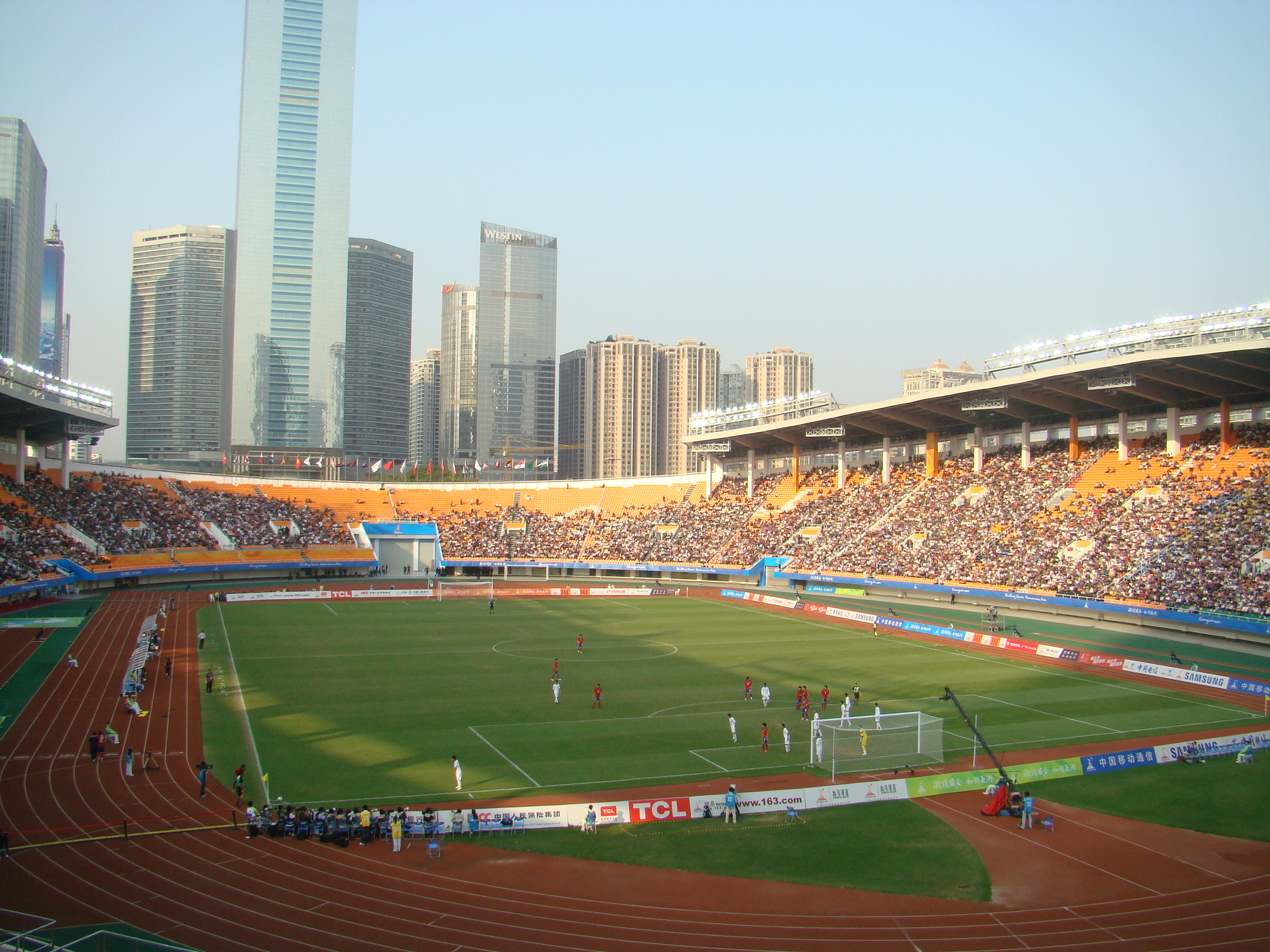
- Tianhe Stadium in Guangzhou hosted the final.
- Event: 1991 FIFA Women's World Cup
Norway	United States
1	2
- Date: 30 November 1991
- Venue: Tianhe Stadium, Guangzhou
- Referee: Vadim Zhuk (Soviet Union)
- Attendance: 63,000

The 1991 FIFA Women's World Cup final was an association football match that took place on 30 November 1991 at Tianhe Stadium in Guangzhou, China. It was played between Norway and the United States to determine the winner of the 1991 FIFA Women's World Cup. The United States beat Norway 2–1, with two goals from Michelle Akers-Stahl, to become winners of the first ever FIFA Women's World Cup.

== Background ==
The final was contested by Norway, who rebounded from a stunning 4–0 defeat by host nation China PR to qualify from their group. They then dispatched Italy and historic rivals Sweden in the knockout rounds to reach the final. The other team in the final was the United States, who went undefeated throughout the competition, thrashing highly rated Germany 5–2 in the semi-final.

== Route to the final ==
Norway
Round
United States
Opponent
Result
Group stage
Opponent
Result
China
0–4
Match 1
Sweden
3–2
New Zealand
4–0
Match 2
Brazil
5–0
Denmark
2–1
Match 3
Japan
3–0

Pos	Team	Pld	Pts
1	China (H)	3	5
2	Norway	3	4
3	Denmark	3	3
4	New Zealand	3	0

Source: FIFA
(H) Hosts
Final standings

Pos	Team	Pld	Pts
1	United States	3	6
2	Sweden	3	4
3	Brazil	3	2
4	Japan	3	0

Source: FIFA
Opponent
Result
Knockout stage
Opponent
Result
Italy
3–2
Quarter-finals
Chinese Taipei
7–0
Sweden
4–1
Semi-finals
Germany
5–2

== Match ==
=== Details ===
30 November 1991
19:45 CST

Norway	1–2	United States
Medalen 29'	Report	Akers-Stahl 20', 78'

Tianhe Stadium, Guangzhou
Attendance: 63,000
Referee: Vadim Zhuk (Soviet Union)

Norway	United States

GK	1	Reidun Seth
SW	8	Heidi Støre (c)
CB	16	Tina Svensson
CB	4	Gro Espeseth
CB	5	Gunn Nyborg
DM	2	Cathrine Zaborowski	(substituted off) 79'
CM	7	Tone Haugen
CM	6	Agnete Carlsen
RW	9	Hege Riise
CF	10	Linda Medalen
LW	11	Birthe Hegstad
Substitutions:
MF	13	Liv Strædet	(substituted on) 79'
Manager:
Even Pellerud

GK	1	Mary Harvey
SW	4	Carla Werden
CB	9	Mia Hamm
CB	14	Joy Biefeld
CB	8	Linda Hamilton
DM	11	Julie Foudy
CM	3	Shannon Higgins
CM	13	Kristine Lilly
RW	2	April Heinrichs (c)
CF	10	Michelle Akers-Stahl	(yellow card) 54'
LW	12	Carin Jennings
Manager:
Anson Dorrance

Assistant referees:
Ingrid Jonsson (Sweden)
Gertrud Regus (Germany)

Match rules:

- 80 minutes.
- 20 minutes of extra time if necessary.
- Penalty shoot-out if scores still level.
- Maximum of two substitutions.

== See also ==
- Norway at the FIFA Women's World Cup
- United States at the FIFA Women's World Cup
