= ISAA Player of the Year =

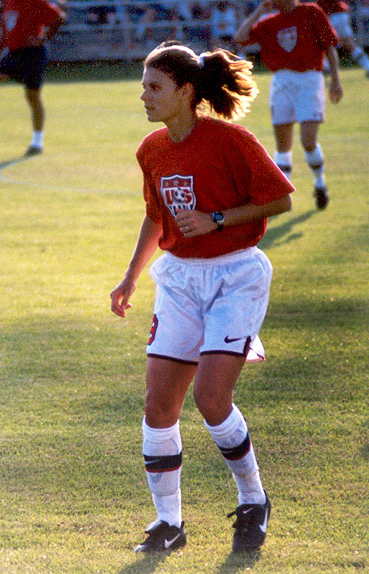
Mia Hamm, 1992 and 1993 winner

The ISAA Player of the Year was an annual U.S. college soccer award presented by the Intercollegiate Soccer Association of America (ISAA) between 1984 and 1995. In 1984, the ISAA began recognizing outstanding men's NCAA soccer players with an annual Player of the Year award. In 1985 the ISAA expanded its recognition program to include women's collegiate players. The ISAA continued to award this honor through the 1995 season, the last year that any player was named. The NCAA recognizes these players in its record books.

== Men's Player of the Year ==
- 1995 — Matt McKeon, St. Louis
- 1994 — Brian Maisonneuve, Indiana
- 1993 — Brian McBride, St. Louis
- 1992 — Robert Ukrop, Davidson
- 1991 — Henry Gutierrez, NC State
- 1990 — Billy Thompson, UCLA
- 1989 — Robert Paterson, Evansville
- 1988 — Dan Donigan, Connecticut
- 1987 — Bruce Murray, Clemson
- 1986 — John Kerr, Duke
- 1985 — Michael Brady, American
- 1984 — Amr Aly, Columbia

== Women's Player of the Year ==
- 1995 — Natalie Neaton, William & Mary
- 1994 — Tisha Venturini, North Carolina
- 1993 — Mia Hamm, North Carolina
- 1992 — Mia Hamm, North Carolina
- 1991 — Kristine Lilly, North Carolina
- 1990 — Brandi Chastain, Santa Clara
- 1989 — Shannon Higgins, North Carolina
- 1988 — Michelle Akers, UCF
- 1987 — Megan McCarthy, William & Mary
- 1986 — April Heinrichs, North Carolina
- 1985 — Pam Baughman, George Mason

== See also ==
- List of sports awards honoring women
- Hermann Trophy
- Soccer America Player of the Year Award
