= Triple-Edged Sword =

The Triple-Edged Sword was the forward line of the victorious United States women's national soccer team at the 1991 FIFA Women's World Cup. The line-up in coach Anson Dorrance's 4–3–3 formation consisted of center forward Michelle Akers (then Michelle Akers-Stahl) and wingers Carin Jennings-Gabarra (then Carin Jennings) and April Heinrichs.

The three players started their first international match together in a 4–1 friendly win over Canada in Blaine, Minnesota, on July 27, 1987. Akers missed almost two years of play after a serious concussion sustained at the 1988 FIFA Women's Invitation Tournament, but returned to play in 1990 as the three players contributed 18 of the United States' 26 goals that year, in six undefeated games.

At the 1991 FIFA Women's World Cup, Jennings-Gabarra won the Golden Ball as the tournament's outstanding player and the Silver Boot as second top–goalscorer. Akers' 10 goals won the Golden Boot and she collected the Silver Ball as runner–up to Jennings-Gabarra. It was the media in host country China who bestowed the nickname "Triple-Edged Sword".

After the 1991 World Cup win, team captain Heinrichs retired from playing due to a knee injury and focused on her coaching career. Mia Hamm, who had played as an attacking right-back in the World Cup, was elevated into the forward line and eventually became the record goalscorer in World women's football.
