= Natalie Neaton =

American soccer player (born 1974)

Personal information
- Full name: Natalie Margaret Neaton
- Date of birth: May 24, 1974 (age 52)
- Place of birth: Brighton, Michigan, U.S.
- Height: 5 ft 10 in (1.78 m)
- Position: Forward

Youth career
- –1992: Detroit Country Day Yellowjackets

College career
| Years | Team | Apps | (Gls) |
| 1992–1995 | William & Mary Tribe | 81 | (81) |

International career
| 1995–1998 | United States | 6 | (4) |

Natalie Margaret Neaton (born May 24, 1974) is an American former soccer player who played as a forward. She made six appearances for the United States women's national team between 1995 and 1998, and is a member of the William & Mary Athletic Hall of Fame.

== Career ==
Neaton played for the Detroit Country Day Yellowjackets in high school, scoring 222 goals in four seasons, three shy of the national record. She was also an All-State basketball player for the Yellowjackets. In college, she played for the William & Mary Tribe. In total, she scored 81 goals and recorded 28 assists during her career with the Tribe, making her the school's record goalscorer. She also has the second most career points (goals and assists) for the school, with 190. She was ISAA Player of the Year in 1995, NSCAA and Soccer America First-Team All-American in 1994, and NSCAA Second-Team All-American in 1992, 1993, and 1995. She was included in the Soccer America All-Rookie Team in 1992, and was a finalist for the Hermann Trophy in 1994.

Neaton made her international debut for the United States on January 23, 1995 in a friendly match against Australia. In total, she made six appearances for the U.S. and scored four goals, earning her final cap on December 16, 1998 in a friendly match against Ukraine.

Neaton later played club soccer in Japan for two years, having received multiple offers from Japanese teams to join once she graduated from college. She was inducted into the William & Mary Athletic Hall of Fame in 2008.

== Personal life ==
Neaton, a native of Brighton, Michigan, now resides in Denver. She has three sons with her husband Jim Simpson.

== Career statistics ==
=== International ===
United States
| Year | Apps | Goals |
|---|---|---|
| 1995 | 3 | 2 |
| 1998 | 3 | 2 |
| Total | 6 | 4 |

=== International goals ===
| No. | Date | Location | Opponent | Score | Result | Competition |
|---|---|---|---|---|---|---|
| 1 | April 30, 1995 | Davidson, North Carolina, United States | Finland | 4–0 | 6–0 | Friendly |
| 2 | May 22, 1995 | Edmonton, Alberta, Canada | Canada | 2–1 | 2–1 | Friendly |
| 3 | May 10, 1998 | Bethlehem, Pennsylvania, United States | Iceland | 1–0 | 1–0 | Friendly |
| 4 | December 16, 1998 | Los Angeles, California, United States | Ukraine | 1–1 | 2–1 | Friendly |
