= Dare to Dream: The Story of the U.S. Women's Soccer Team =

2005 sports documentary

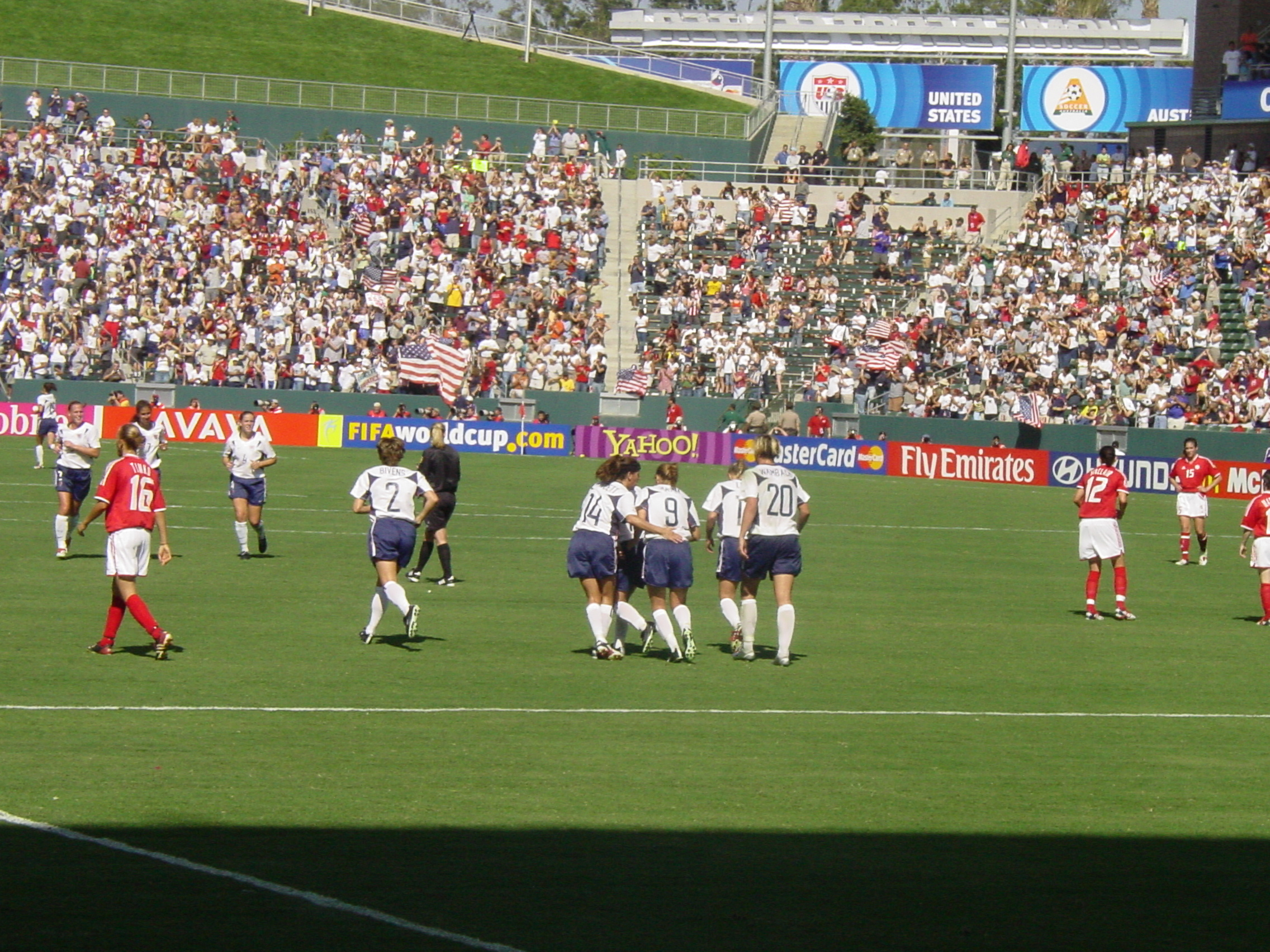
- 2003 World Cup
- Also known as: Dare to Dream
- Written by: Ouisie Shapiro
- Starring: Brandi Chastain; Mia Hamm; Julie Foudy; Kristine Lilly; Joy Fawcett; Emily Stutzman
- Country of origin: United States
- Original language: English

Production
- Running time: 77 minutes

Original release
- Network: HBO
- Release: December 11, 2005

Dare to Dream is a 2005 sports documentary about the United States women's national soccer team. It describes the pivotal roles of Brandi Chastain, Mia Hamm, Julie Foudy, Kristine Lilly, and Joy Fawcett in the development of the team. These athletes also give interviews for the film. It was created by the "Peabody Award-winning creative team at HBO Sports" and "follows the 18-year journey of the U.S. women's soccer team from obscurity in the late 1980s to its second Olympic gold match in 2004." The DVD of the film was released on 19 September 2007.

== Awards ==
- 2006 Billie Award in Entertainment

== See also ==
- List of association football films
