= Wendy Gebauer =

American soccer player (born 1966)

Personal information
- Full name: Wendy Gebauer Palladino
- Birth name: Wendy Sue Gebauer
- Date of birth: December 25, 1966 (age 59)
- Place of birth: United States
- Position: Forward

College career
Years	Team	Apps	(Gls)
1986–1989	North Carolina Tar Heels		

Senior career*
Years	Team	Apps	(Gls)
1998–2000	Raleigh Wings		
1999	Raleigh Capital Express	1	(0)

International career
1987–1991	United States	26	(10)
Medal record
FIFA Women's World Cup
Gold medal – first place	1991 USA	Team competition
- * Club domestic league appearances and goals

Wendy Gebauer Palladino (born Wendy Sue Gebauer; December 25, 1966) is an American retired soccer forward and former member of the United States women's national soccer team. Considered a pioneer of women's soccer in the United States, Gebauer played on the 1991 United States women's national soccer team that won the first Women's World Cup in China. She was inducted into the Virginia-DC Soccer Hall of Fame in 2009.

== Early life ==
Gebauer grew up in Reston, Virginia and began playing soccer at age six.

=== University of North Carolina ===
Gebauer attended the University of North Carolina and played for the Tar Heels led by national team coach at the time, Anson Dorrance. A highly decorated player, Gebauer was a three-time All-American, three-time National Champion, and was also on the Atlantic Coast Conference Academic Honor Roll.

== Playing career ==
=== Club ===
==== Raleigh Wings ====
From 1998 to 2000, Gebauer played for the Raleigh Wings and was co-captain of the two-time National Championship winning team in the W-League.

==== Raleigh Capital Express ====
In 1999, Gebauer made history when she became the first female to suit up and play with men on the Raleigh Capital Express a team in the second level division in the United States at the time. Nearly 2,000 fans showed up for the game, one of the largest crowds for the season.

=== International ===
Gebauer played for the United States women's national soccer team from 1987 to 1991. In 1991, she was part of the team that won the first Women's World Cup in China and scored a goal during the final group match.

== Sports broadcasting career ==
Gebauer was the color commentator for collegiate women's soccer on the Fox Sports Network for five years. For seven years, she was the lead analyst for coverage of the U.S. Women's National Soccer team on ESPN, including the 1999 and 2003 Women's World Cup. In 2001, she was an analyst for TNT during their broadcast of WUSA games, the first women's professional soccer league in the United States.
