= Carla Overbeck =

American soccer player (born 1968)

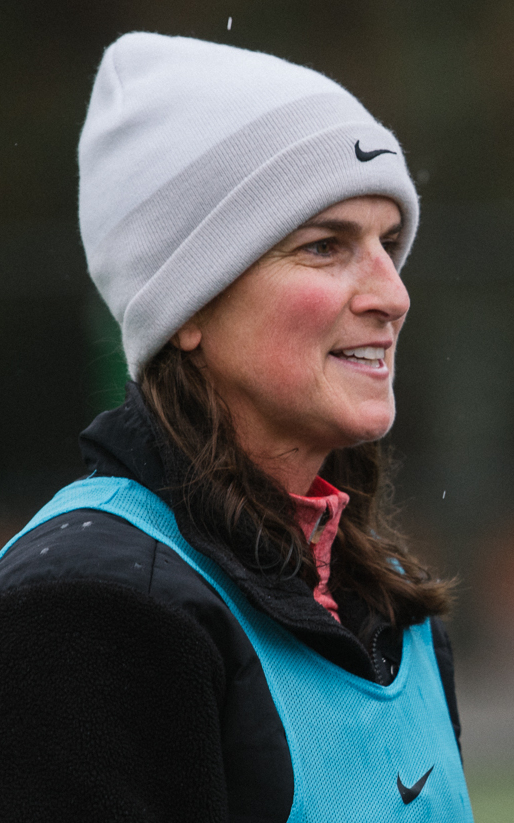
- Overbeck in 2014

Personal information
- Full name: Carla Werden Overbeck
- Birth name: Carla Werden
- Date of birth: May 9, 1968 (age 58)
- Place of birth: Pasadena, California, U.S.
- Height: 5 ft 7 in (1.70 m)
- Position: Defender

College career
Years	Team	Apps	(Gls)
1986–1989	North Carolina Tar Heels		

Senior career*
Years	Team	Apps	(Gls)
1998	Raleigh Wings	5	(1)
2001–2003	Carolina Courage	45	(2)

International career
1988–2000	United States	170	(7)

Managerial career
- 1992–: Duke Blue Devils (assistant)
Medal record
Women's football (soccer)
Representing the United States
Olympic Games
Gold medal – first place	1996 Atlanta	Team competition
Silver medal – second place	2000 Sydney	Team competition
FIFA Women's World Cup
Gold medal – first place	1991 China	Team competition
Gold medal – first place	1999 USA	Team competition
Bronze medal – third place	1995 Sweden	Team competition
- * Club domestic league appearances and goals

Carla Werden Overbeck (née Werden; born May 9, 1968) is an American former soccer player who is currently an assistant coach for the Duke Blue Devils women's soccer team. Captain of the United States national team from 1993 to 2000, she helped lead the team to two FIFA Women's World Cups and an Olympic gold medal. She played collegiately for the North Carolina Tar Heels. She has been an assistant coach for Duke since 1992, overseeing its defensive unit principally. She was inducted into the National Soccer Hall of Fame in 2006.

== Playing career ==
=== Youth ===
Overbeck began playing soccer at the age of 11, playing for club soccer team the Dallas Sting. With the Sting, she won two national championships.

=== College ===
Overbeck played college soccer at the University of North Carolina at Chapel Hill from 1986 to 1989, where she won the NCAA Women's Soccer Championship each of her four seasons. She was an NSCAA All-America selection three times. During her time as a central defender with the Tar Heels, the team tallied a 95-match unbeaten streak (89–0–6).

Overbeck was a four-time member of the NCAA All-Tournament Team and a two-time All-ACC selection. In addition, she was a member of the 1986 Soccer America All-America Freshman Team and was the Most Valuable Defensive Player of the 1988 NCAA Tournament.

On May 6, 2006, Overbeck was elected to the National Soccer Hall of Fame and was a 2010 North Carolina Sports Hall of Fame inductee.

=== Club ===
Overbeck played for the Raleigh Wings of the W-League in 1998 and helped the team finish with a 14–0 record and clinch the league's championship title.

From 2001 to 2003, Overbeck played for the Carolina Courage in the WUSA, the first professional soccer league for women in the United States. She was also on the WUSA Board of Governors. In August 2002, her overtime goal in the semifinal match helped lift the Courage to the WUSA Founders Cup II, the league's championship game against the Washington Freedom, led by Mia Hamm and Abby Wambach. The Courage defeated the Freedom 3–2 to clinch the championship title on August 24, 2002.

=== International ===
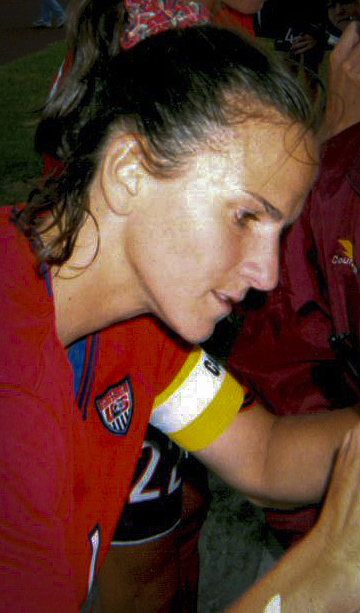
Overbeck signing autographs in 2007

Overbeck first appeared with the U.S. national team on June 1, 1988, and was a member of the U.S. team that won the first-ever FIFA Women's World Cup in 1991. Playing central defender, she led a defense that allowed five goals in six matches. She became captain of the team in 1993.

She was one of two players to play every minute of each of the team's games at the 1995 FIFA Women's World Cup, the 1996 Summer Olympics, and the 1999 Women's World Cup. In 1998, she captained the national team to win the first-ever Goodwill Games.

Overbeck retired from international competition following the 2000 Summer Olympics, finishing her career with 168 caps.

== Coaching career ==
Overbeck has been an assistant coach for Duke University's women's soccer team since 1992.

== Media coverage ==
Overbeck appeared with her national team teammates on the cover of Sports Illustrated's December 20, 1999 issue. She was featured in the film Dare to Dream: The Story of the U.S. Women's Soccer Team in 2007.

Overbeck was featured in the ESPN series Nine for IX in "The 99ers" episode.

== Personal life ==
Born in Pasadena, California, Overbeck grew up in Richardson, Texas, a suburb of Dallas, where she attended Richardson High School. She graduated from the University of North Carolina at Chapel Hill with a degree in psychology in 1990. In late 1999, Overbeck was diagnosed with Graves' disease. In December 2009, she became an official spokesperson for Instaflex. She and her husband, Greg Overbeck, have one son, Jackson, and a daughter, Carson Elizabeth.

== Honors and awards ==
=== Individual ===
- National Soccer Hall of Fame inductee, 2006
- North Carolina Sports Hall of Fame inductee, 2010

=== Team ===
- Sports Illustrated Sportswomen of the Year, December 1999
- WUSA Founders Cup II, 2002

== See also ==
- List of University of North Carolina at Chapel Hill Olympians
- List of Olympic medalists in football
- List of 1996 Summer Olympics medal winners
- List of 2000 Summer Olympics medal winners
- List of members of the North Carolina Sports Hall of Fame
