= Carin Jennings-Gabarra =

American soccer player (born 1965)

Personal information
- Full name: Carin Leslie Jennings-Gabarra
- Birth name: Carin Leslie Jennings
- Date of birth: January 9, 1965 (age 61)
- Place of birth: East Orange, New Jersey, U.S.
- Height: 5 ft 8 in (1.73 m)
- Position: Forward

Youth career
- 1980–1983: Palos Verdes High School

College career
Years	Team	Apps	(Gls)
1983–1986	UC Santa Barbara Gauchos	79	(102)

Senior career*
Years	Team	Apps	(Gls)
- Southern California Ajax

International career
1987–1996	United States	117	(56)

Managerial career
- 1987: Westmont College
- 1988: Harvard (assistant)
- 1993–: Navy
Medal record
Women's football (soccer)
Representing the United States
Olympic Games
Gold medal – first place	1996 Atlanta	Team competition
FIFA Women's World Cup
Gold medal – first place	1991 China	Team competition
Bronze medal – third place	1995 Sweden	Team competition
- * Club domestic league appearances and goals

Carin Leslie Jennings-Gabarra (née Jennings; born January 9, 1965) is an American retired soccer forward. She earned 117 caps with the United States women's national soccer team from 1987 to 1996 and was awarded the Golden Ball Award as the best player at the 1991 FIFA Women's World Cup. In 2000, she was inducted into the National Soccer Hall of Fame. She currently coaches women's soccer at the United States Naval Academy.

== Early life and education ==
While born in East Orange, New Jersey, Jennings-Gabarra grew up in Rancho Palos Verdes, California, where she attended Palos Verdes High School from 1980 to 1983. During her four seasons playing high school soccer, she scored 226 goals and was a four-time High School All-American and a three-time California Most Valuable Player.

After high school, Jennings-Gabarra attended the University of California, Santa Barbara where she played on the UC Santa Barbara Gauchos women's soccer team from 1983 through 1986. In 1984, Jennings-Gabarra set the NCAA Division I women's soccer single-season records for goals (34), goals per game (1.55), points (80), and points per game (3.64).

She finished her college career holding numerous NCAA Division I women's soccer records including 102 goals scored, 1.29 goals per game, 60 assists, 0.76 assists per game, 264 points, and 3.34 points per game.

She was named a second-team All-American in 1984 and 1985 and a third-team All-American in 1987. She graduated from UCSB in 1987 with a bachelor's degree in business management. Gabarra was named the school's Athlete of the Decade and in 1991 the university inducted Gabarra into its Hall of Fame.

In 2000, Soccer America selected Jennings-Gabarra to its College Team of the Century.

== Playing career ==
=== Club ===
Jennings-Gabarra played with The Los Angeles Blues (later the Southern California Blues) and later with Southern California Ajax of Manhattan Beach, California. In 1992 and 1993, Ajax won the USASA National Amateur Cup. Jennings and defender Joy Fawcett both were members of the Manhattan Beach club women's soccer team Ajax in the late 1980s and early 1990s and routinely played at Columbia Park in Torrance, California. In 1991, Ajax won the U.S. women's amateur championship.

In 1993, Los Angeles United of the Continental Indoor Soccer League drafted Jennings-Gabarra.

=== International ===
Jennings-Gabarra's fame rests on her achievements with the United States women's national soccer team. During her ten-year career, spanning 1987 to 1996, she earned 117 caps and scored 53 goals.

==== 1991 World Cup ====
During the early 1990s, Jennings-Gabarra was part of the national team's "Triple-Edged Sword". The term, coined by the Chinese media during the 1991 FIFA Women's World Cup, included two other prolific scorers, April Heinrichs and Michelle Akers. Of those three players, Akers scored ten goals at the World Cup to claim the Golden Boot, while Jennings-Gabarra added six as the tournament's second-leading scorer. Jennings helped the U.S. national team win the first FIFA Women's World Cup. She was also selected as the Golden Ball Award winner as the tournament's top player.

==== 1995 World Cup ====
In 1995, Jennings-Gabarra and her teammates came up short in the 1995 FIFA Women's World Cup, losing to Norway in the semifinals. The team finished third in the tournament, with a 2–0 win over China in the third-place playoff match.

==== 1996 Olympics ====
In 1996, the U.S. won the first women's Olympic soccer tournament. Following the tournament, she retired from playing international soccer.

==== Matches and goals scored at World Cup and Olympic tournaments ====
Carin Jennings-Gabarra competed in the 1996 Atlanta Olympics, as well as the 1991 and 1995 editions of the FIFA Women's World Cup. She played 16 matches and scored 6 goals at those 3 global tournaments.

== Playing style ==
"Her greatest quality is that she can beat defenses on her own. She is creative and has great athletic ability and agility. She has great speed, can change direction quickly and still keep control of the ball."

— Anson Dorrance, 1991

Jennings-Gabarra is renowned for her remarkable ball control, imagination, dribbling skills and feints on the wing, as well as her ability to create chances out of nothing. Her distinctive gait earned her the sobriquets "Crazy Legs" and "Gumby".

Also an effective goalscorer, she struck a 23-minute hat-trick against Germany to put the United States 3–0 ahead in the 1991 FIFA Women's World Cup semi-final. The Los Angeles Times reported that "Carin Jennings, the ponytailed winger from Palos Verdes, tore the Germans to shreds". In 1999 Assistant coach Lauren Gregg hailed Jennings-Gabarra's performance against Germany as the single greatest ever by an American player.

Jennings-Gabarra epitomizes the speed, fitness, and mental strength coach Anson Dorrance demanded of his players. "Before every game, Anson would challenge us, asking us which of us was going to make the difference. I always wanted to be that player." Teammates saw Jennings-Gabarra as setting the standard for the group.

== Coaching career ==
Gabarra began coaching following her graduation from UCSB in 1987. That year, Westmont College, located in Santa Barbara, California, hired her as its women's soccer coach. After one season, she moved to Harvard, where she was an assistant coach. In 1993, the United States Naval Academy in Annapolis, Maryland, hired Gabarra as its women's soccer coach. At the time the women's team competed at the club level. She developed it into a competitive Division I NCAA team.

In 2000, Gabarra was inducted into the National Soccer Hall of Fame. In 2003, she was inducted into the U.S. Olympic Hall of Fame.

== Personal life ==
In 1992, Gabarra married U.S. men's national team player Jim Gabarra. They have two daughters and one son. Gabarra is a member of the U.S. Soccer Athlete Advisory Council, the U.S. Olympic Committee Athlete Advisory Council, and the Maryland Physical Fitness Council.

== Awards and honors ==
World Cup Winner

- 1991

Olympic Gold Medal

- 1996

US National Amateur Cup

- 1992, 1993

California Prep MVP

- 1981, 1982, 1983

High School All American

- 1980, 1981, 1982, 1983

NCAA Division I All American

- 1984, 1985, 1986

FIFA World Cup Golden Ball

- 1991

US Soccer Athlete of the Year

- 1987, 1992

U.S. Olympic Player of the Year

- 1987, 1992

National Soccer Medal of Honor

- 2001

Hall of Fame

- National Soccer Hall of Fame
- U.S. Olympic Hall of Fame
- American Youth Soccer Organization Hall of Fame

Key (expand for notes on "world cup and olympic goals")
Location	Geographic location of the venue where the competition occurred
Lineup	Start – played entire match on minute (off player) – substituted on at the minute indicated, and player was substituted off at the same time off minute (on player) – substituted off at the minute indicated, and player was substituted on at the same time (c) – captain
Min	The minute in the match the goal was scored. For list that include caps, blank indicates played in the match but did not score a goal.
Assist/pass	The ball was passed by the player, which assisted in scoring the goal. This column depends on the availability and source of this information.
penalty or pk	Goal scored on penalty-kick which was awarded due to foul by opponent. (Goals scored in penalty-shoot-out, at the end of a tied match after extra-time, are not included.)
Score	The match score after the goal was scored.
Result	The final score. W – match was won L – match was lost to opponent D – match was drawn (W) – penalty-shoot-out was won after a drawn match (L) – penalty-shoot-out was lost after a drawn match
aet	The score at the end of extra-time; the match was tied at the end of 90' regulation
pso	Penalty-shoot-out score shown in parentheses; the match was tied at the end of extra-time
	Pink background color – Olympic women's football tournament
	Blue background color – FIFA women's world cup final tournament

Goal	Match	Date	Location	Opponent	Lineup	Min	Score	Result	Competition
China 1991 FIFA Women's World Cup
1	1	1991-11-17	Panyu	Sweden	Start	40	1–0	3–2 W	Group match
2	1	1991-11-17	Panyu	Sweden	Start	49	2–0	3–2 W	Group match
3	2	1991-11-19	Panyu	Brazil	Start	38	3–0	5–0 W	Group match
	3	1991-11-21	Foshan	Japan	off 41' (on Hamm)			3–0 W	Group match
	4	1991-11-24	Foshan	Chinese Taipei	Start			7–0 W	Quarter-final
4	5	1991-11-27	Guangzhou	Germany	Start	10	1–0	5–2 W	Semifinal
5	5	1991-11-27	Guangzhou	Germany	Start	22	2–0	5–2 W	Semifinal
6	5	1991-11-27	Guangzhou	Germany	Start	33	3–0	5–2 W	Semifinal
	6	1991-11-30	Guangzhou	Norway	Start			2–1 W	Final
Sweden 1995 FIFA Women's World Cup
	7	1995-06-06	Gävle	China	Start			3–3 D	Group match
	8	1995-06-08	Gävle	Denmark	off 85' (on Rafanelli)			2–0 W	Group match
	9	1995-06-10	Helsingborg	Australia	on 45' (off Manthei)			4–1 W	Group match
	10	1995-06-13	Gävle	Japan	Start			4–0 W	Quarter-final
	11	1995-06-15	Västerås	Norway	Start			0–1 L	Semifinal
	12	1995-06-17	Gävle	China	off 80' (on Rafanelli)			2–0 W	Third place match
(United States) Atlanta 1996 Olympic Women's Football Tournament
	13	1996-07-21	Orlando, FL	Denmark	on 75' (off Hamm)			3–0 W	Group stage
	14	1996-07-23	Orlando, FL	Sweden	on 85' (off Hamm)			2–1 W	Group stage
	15	1996-07-25	Miami, FL	China	on 30' (off Milbrett)			0–0 D	Group stage
	16	1996-08-01	Athens, GA	China	on 89' (off Hamm)			2–1 W	Gold medal match

== International goals ==
No.	Date	Venue	Opponent	Score	Result	Competition
1.	18 April 1991	Stade Sylvio Cator, Port-au-Prince, Haiti	Mexico	11–0	12–0	1991 CONCACAF Women's Championship
2.	22 April 1991	Stade Sylvio Cator, Port-au-Prince, Haiti	Trinidad and Tobago	?–0	10–0	1991 CONCACAF Women's Championship
3.	22 April 1991	Stade Sylvio Cator, Port-au-Prince, Haiti	Trinidad and Tobago	?–0	10–0	1991 CONCACAF Women's Championship
4.	25 April 1991	Stade Sylvio Cator, Port-au-Prince, Haiti	Haiti	?–0	10–0	1991 CONCACAF Women's Championship
5.	25 April 1991	Stade Sylvio Cator, Port-au-Prince, Haiti	Haiti	?–0	10–0	1991 CONCACAF Women's Championship
6.	17 November 1991	Ying Tung Stadium, Guangzhou, China	Sweden	1–0	3–2	1991 FIFA Women's World Cup
7.	17 November 1991	Ying Tung Stadium, Guangzhou, China	Sweden	2–0	3–2	1991 FIFA Women's World Cup
8.	19 November 1991	Ying Tung Stadium, Guangzhou, China	Brazil	3–0	5–0	1991 FIFA Women's World Cup
9.	27 November 1991	Guangdong Provincial Stadium, Guangzhou, China	Germany	1–0	5–2	1991 FIFA Women's World Cup
10.	27 November 1991	Guangdong Provincial Stadium, Guangzhou, China	Germany	2–0	5–2	1991 FIFA Women's World Cup
11.	27 November 1991	Guangdong Provincial Stadium, Guangzhou, China	Germany	3–0	5–2	1991 FIFA Women's World Cup
