= Sarah Rafanelli =

American soccer player (born 1972)

Personal information
- Full name: Sarah Elizabeth Rafanelli
- Date of birth: June 7, 1972 (age 54)
- Place of birth: Santa Clara, California, U.S.
- Height: 5 ft 4 in (1.63 m)
- Position: Forward

College career
Years	Team	Apps	(Gls)
1990–1993	Stanford Cardinal		

International career
1992–1995	United States	35	(8)
Medal record
FIFA Women's World Cup
Bronze medal – third place	1995 Sweden

Sarah Elizabeth Rafanelli (born June 7, 1972) is an American retired soccer forward and former member of the United States women's national soccer team.

== Early life ==
Rafanelli was born in Santa Clara, California to parents, Mark and Pam Rafanelli and is the second of four sisters. She began playing soccer at age eight and played volleyball and tennis at the College Preparatory School in Oakland, joining the school's soccer team late in high school.

=== Stanford University ===
Rafanelli attended Stanford University from 1990 to 1993. During her senior year with the Stanford Cardinal, Rafanelli led the team to an 18–2–2 record and trip to the Final Four. She led Stanford in scoring during three of her four seasons with the team, scoring 59 career goals, providing 34 assists for a total of 152 points – all records at the school. In her four years with the Cardinal, the team went 67–9–4 and advanced to the NCAA Playoffs each season.

Rafanelli earned All-American honors in 1992 and 1993 and set a new scoring record that would stand for 17 years until finally being beaten by Christen Press in 2010. The previous scoring record had been set the preceding year by Rafanelli's teammate, Julie Foudy.

== Playing career ==
=== International ===
Rafanelli played for the United States women's national soccer team from 1992 to 1995. In 1995, she was part of the team that won bronze at the Women's World Cup.

== Coaching career ==
Rafanelli was an assistant coach at her alma mater, Stanford University, in 1994.
