= Shannon Higgins-Cirovski =

American soccer player (born 1968)

Personal information
- Full name: Shannon Danise Higgins-Cirovski
- Birth name: Shannon Danise Higgins
- Date of birth: February 20, 1968 (age 58)
- Place of birth: Kent, Washington, U.S.
- Height: 5 ft 10 in (1.78 m)
- Position: Midfielder

College career
Years	Team	Apps	(Gls)
1986–1989	North Carolina Tar Heels		

International career
1987–1991	United States	51	(4)

Managerial career
- 1990: George Washington Colonials (assistant)
- 1991–1997: George Washington Colonials
- 1998: United States U18
- 1999–2006: Maryland Terrapins

Shannon Danise Higgins-Cirovski (née Higgins; born February 20, 1968) is an American former soccer midfielder who earned 51 caps with the United States between 1987 and 1991. She was a member of the U.S. team at the 1991 FIFA Women's World Cup and is a member of the National Soccer Hall of Fame.

== Early life and college ==
Higgins grew up in Kent, Washington, where she attended Mount Rainier High School. She graduated from high school in 1986 and entered the University of North Carolina at Chapel Hill that fall, playing on the women's soccer team from 1986 to 1989. During those four seasons, UNC-Chapel Hill won four consecutive NCAA Championships. Higgins scored the game-winning goal in the last three championship games. She was a two-time first team All American (1988 and 1989) and the recipient of numerous awards including the 1988 and 1989 Soccer America Player of the Year, 1989 ISAA Player of the Year and the 1989 Hermann Trophy. She won the Honda Sports Award as the nations's top soccer player at the end of the 1989–90 season. In 2000, she was named to the Soccer America College Team of the Century. Higgins graduated from UNC in 1990 with a bachelor's degree in industrial relations.

== National team ==
Higgins earned fifty-one caps with the United States between 1987 and 1991. Her greatest achievement came in the 1991 FIFA Women's World Cup when her playmaking skills were a central part of the U.S.'s championship run. In the 2–1 final, Higgins assisted on both of Michelle Akers goals.

== Coach ==
Following her graduation from UNC in 1990, Higgins-Cirovski was hired as an assistant coach to the George Washington University women's soccer team. In 1992, she was elevated to the position of head coach, taking the team to a 69–59–11 record before resigning in 1997. She was inducted into the university's Athletic Hall of Fame in 2003. In 1998, Higgins-Cirovski served as the head coach of the U.S. U-18 women's national team. On January 13, 1999, she was hired as the University of Maryland, College Park women's soccer team, a position she held until resigning in 2006. She had a 62–51–10 (.549) record over her six seasons. Her husband, Sasho Cirovski, coaches the school's men's soccer team.

== Broadcaster ==
In 2001, Higgins-Cirovski was a color commentator for the television broadcasts of the Washington Freedom of the WUSA.

She was inducted into the National Soccer Hall of Fame in 2002. That year, the Atlantic Coast Conference named her to its list of the Top 50 ACC Athletes in the first fifty years of the conference's existence.
