= Tianhe Stadium =

Stadium in Guangzhou, Guangdong, China

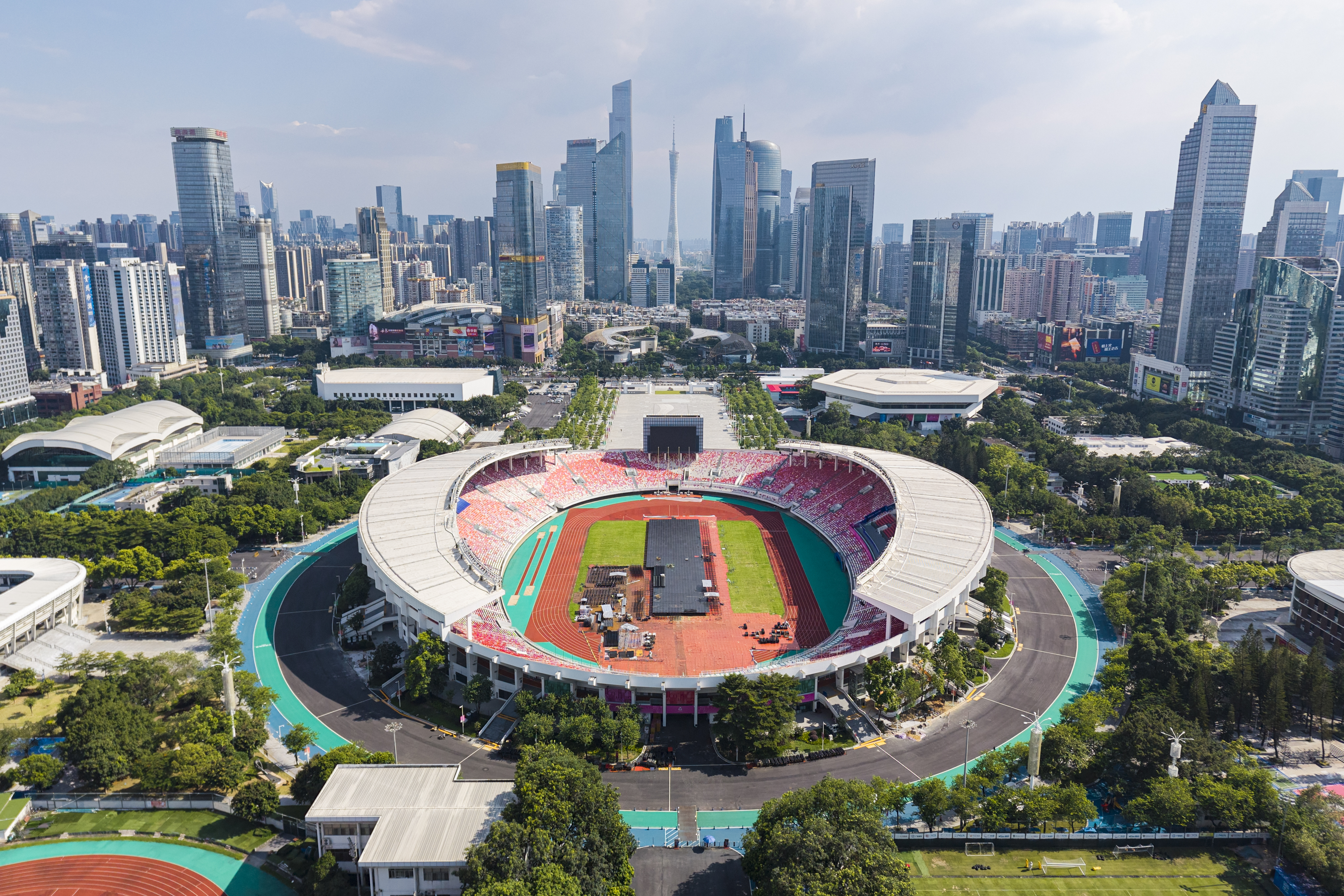
- Tianhe Stadium in 2025
- Interactive map of Tianhe Stadium
- Location: Tianhe District, Guangzhou, Guangdong, China
- Coordinates: 23.1406°N 113.3193°E
- Owner: Guangzhou People's Government
- Operator: Guangzhou Sports Bureau
- Capacity: 54,856
- Surface: Grass
- Field size: 105 by 68 meters (115 by 74 yd)
- Public transit: Tianhe Sports Center 1 Linhexi 3 Tiyu Xilu 1 3 APM Tianhe Sports Center South, Linhexi; GBRT Sports Center

Construction
- Groundbreaking: 4 July 1984
- Built: 1984–1987
- Opened: 30 August 1987; 39 years ago
- Renovated: 2001, 2009, 2016, 2018

Tenant
- Guangzhou F.C. (2005, 2011–2019)

Tianhe Stadium (Chinese: 天河体育场), officially Tianhe Sports Centre Stadium (Chinese: 天河体育中心体育场), is a multi-purpose stadium in Tianhe District, Guangzhou, Guangdong, China. It is currently used for football matches.

== History ==
Construction of the stadium began on 4 July 1984 at the former site of Guangzhou Tianhe Airport. It was opened in August 1987 for the 1987 National Games of China. In 1991, it hosted the final match of the inaugural FIFA Women's World Cup between the United States and Norway. Local football team Guangzhou Evergrande moved into the stadium ahead of the 2011 season following promotion to the Chinese Super League. In February 2016, the club obtained the operating rights of the stadium from Guangzhou Sports Bureau for the next twenty years.

The stadium hosted the football finals of the 2010 Asian Games.

== International events ==
=== 1991 FIFA Women's World Cup matches ===
Date	Stage	Team	Res.	Team	Att.
16 November 1991	Group A	China	4–0	Norway	65,000
17 November 1991	Group A	Denmark	2–0	New Zealand	14,000
24 November 1991	Quarter-finals	China	0–1	Sweden	55,000
30 November 1991	Final	Norway	1–2	United States	63,000

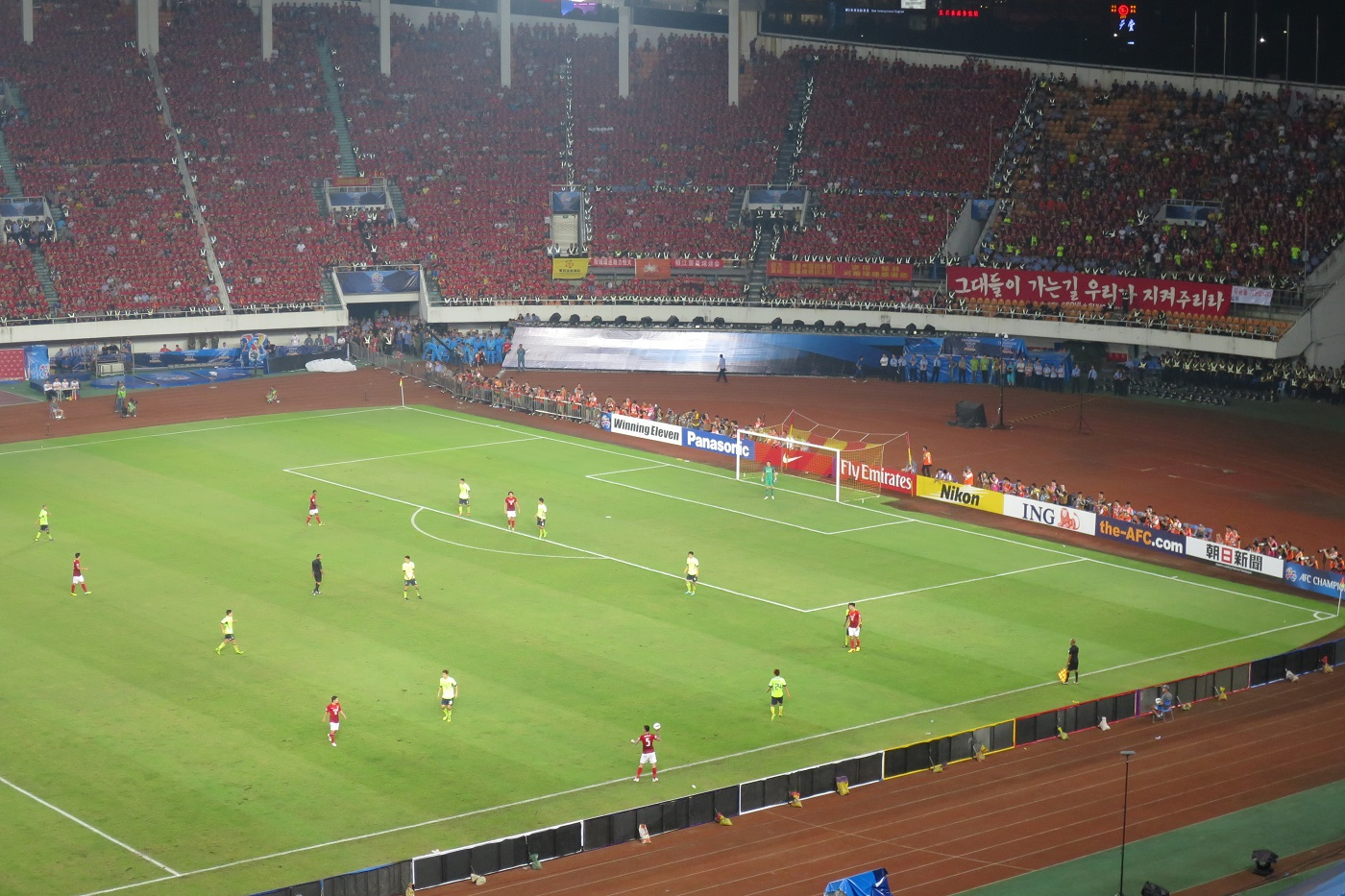
2013 AFC Champions League final at Tianhe Stadium

== Transport ==
The stadium is best reached by taking Guangzhou Metro Line 1 to Tianhe Sports Center Station (East Gate), Line 3 to Linhexi Station (North Gate) and Line 1 or 3 to Tiyu Xilu Station (West Gate and South Gate).

Preceded by None; inaugural event	FIFA Women's World Cup; Final venue 1991	Succeeded by Råsunda Stadium; Stockholm
Preceded by Jassim Bin Hamad Stadium; Al Rayyan	Asian Games; Final venue 2010	Succeeded by Incheon Munhak Stadium; Incheon
