= Debbie Rademacher =

American soccer player (born 1966)

Personal information
- Full name: Debbie Belkin Rademacher
- Birth name: Debbie Belkin
- Date of birth: May 27, 1966 (age 60)
- Place of birth: United States
- Height: 5 ft 7 in (1.70 m)
- Position: Defender

College career
Years	Team	Apps	(Gls)
1984–1987	UMass Minutewomen		

International career
1986–1991	United States	50	(2)

Managerial career
- 1988–1989: Tufts Jumbos (assistant)
- 1989–1991: New Hampshire Wildcats (assistant)
- 1992–1993: Fairfield Stags
- 1994–2007: Michigan Wolverines

Debbie Belkin Rademacher (née Belkin; born May 27, 1966) is an American retired soccer defender who was a member of the United States women's national soccer team.

She was inducted into the National Jewish Sports Hall of Fame.

== International career statistics ==
Nation	Year	International Appearances				
Nation	Year	Apps	Starts	Minutes	Goals	Assists
United States	1986	6	6	540	0	0
United States	1987	8	8	720	0	0
United States	1988	7	7	630	1	0
United States	1990	5	5	450	0	1
United States	1991	24	20	1948	1	2
Career Total	5	50	46	4288	2	3
