= Debbie Keller =

American soccer player (born 1975)

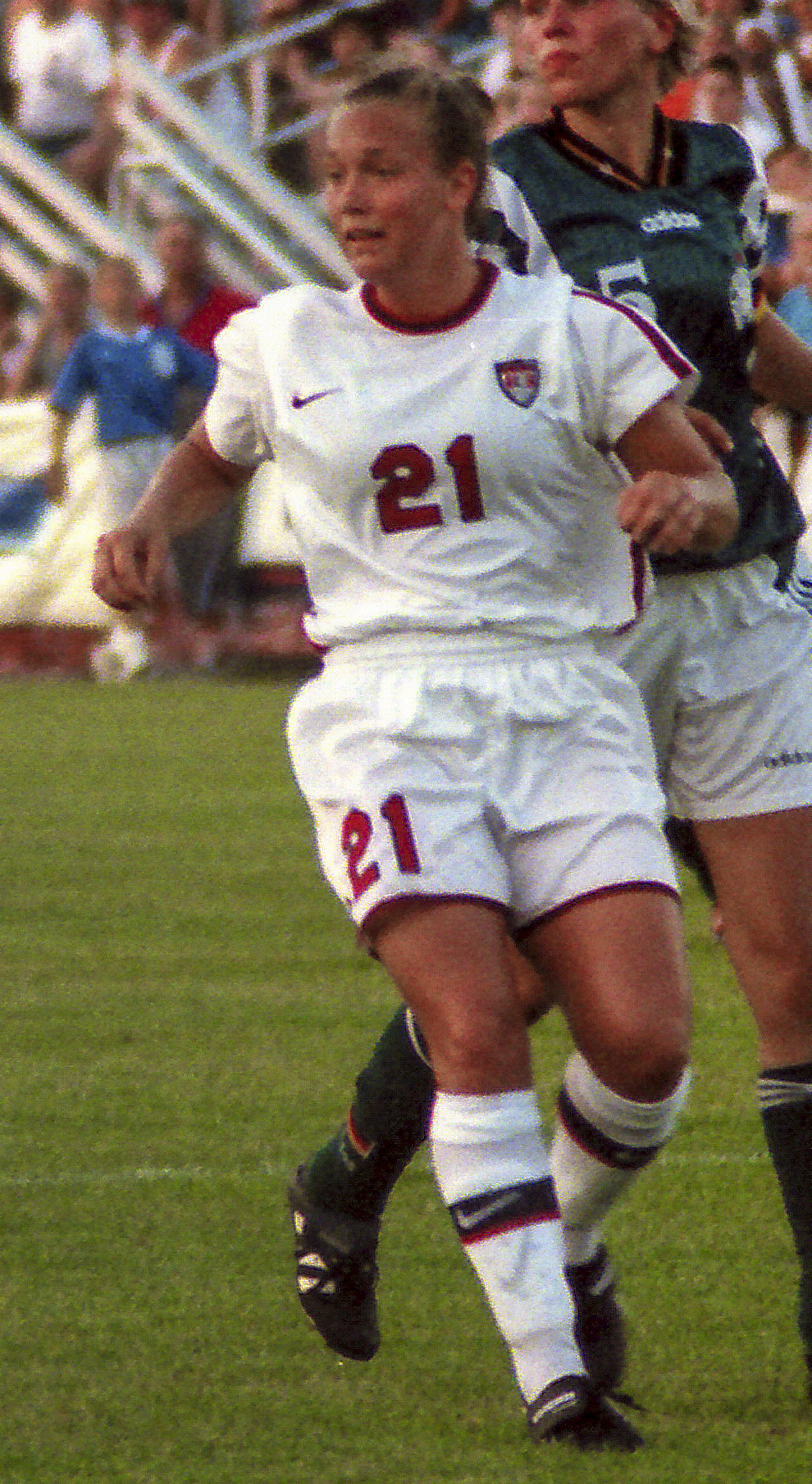
- Keller in 1995

Personal information
- Full name: Deborah Kim Keller
- Date of birth: March 24, 1975 (age 51)
- Place of birth: Winfield, Illinois, United States
- Height: 5 ft 4 in (1.63 m)
- Position: Forward

College career
Years	Team	Apps	(Gls)
1993–1996	North Carolina Tar Heels		

Senior career*
Years	Team	Apps	(Gls)
1997	Rockford Dactyls		
1999	Fortuna Hjørring		
2000	Rockford Dactyls		

International career
1995–1998	United States	46	(18)
Medal record
FIFA Women's World Cup
Bronze medal – third place	1995 USA	Team competition
- * Club domestic league appearances and goals

Deborah Kim Keller (born March 24, 1975) is an American retired soccer forward and former member of the United States women's national soccer team. She was the collegiate National Player of the Year in 1995 and 1996.

== Early life ==
Born in Winfield, Illinois, Keller was raised in Naperville where she attended Waubonsie Valley High School and played for the women's soccer team where her mother was the head coach. Throughout her high school career, Keller scored 144 goals and served 92 assists. She was named a Parade All-American twice and was named to the Chicago Tribune Top 20 Scholar-Athlete Team.

=== North Carolina Tar Heels ===
Keller attended University of North Carolina from 1993 to 1996 where she played for the Tar Heels led by national team coach, Anson Dorrance. During her junior season, she scored 23 goals and served 14 assists in the 26 games she played. Five of her goals came during Tar Heels' 8–0 defeat of North Carolina State University. The following year, she scored 18 goals and served 16 assists in 22 games.

In 1998, Keller and her Tar Heel teammate Melissa Jennings filed a sexual harassment lawsuit against Dorrance that ended ten years later in a settlement.

== Playing career ==
=== Club ===
In March 1999 Keller signed for Danish Elitedivisionen team Fortuna Hjørring, scoring on her debut on April 1, 1999. She received a letter of intent from Women's United Soccer Association, but did not join the new league because of Dorrance's involvement in it.

=== International ===
Keller played for the United States women's national soccer team from 1995 to 1999. In 1998, her 14 goals ranked third on the team behind Mia Hamm and Tiffeny Milbrett. She was cut from the team before the 1999 FIFA Women's World Cup and unsuccessfully took legal action to be reinstated, suggesting her exclusion by coach Tony DiCicco had been a retaliation for the Dorrance lawsuit.

== Personal life ==
After retiring from soccer, Keller went to beauty school to become a hairstylist. She was married in 2001 to Chris Hill.
