= April Heinrichs =

American former soccer player and coach (born 1964)

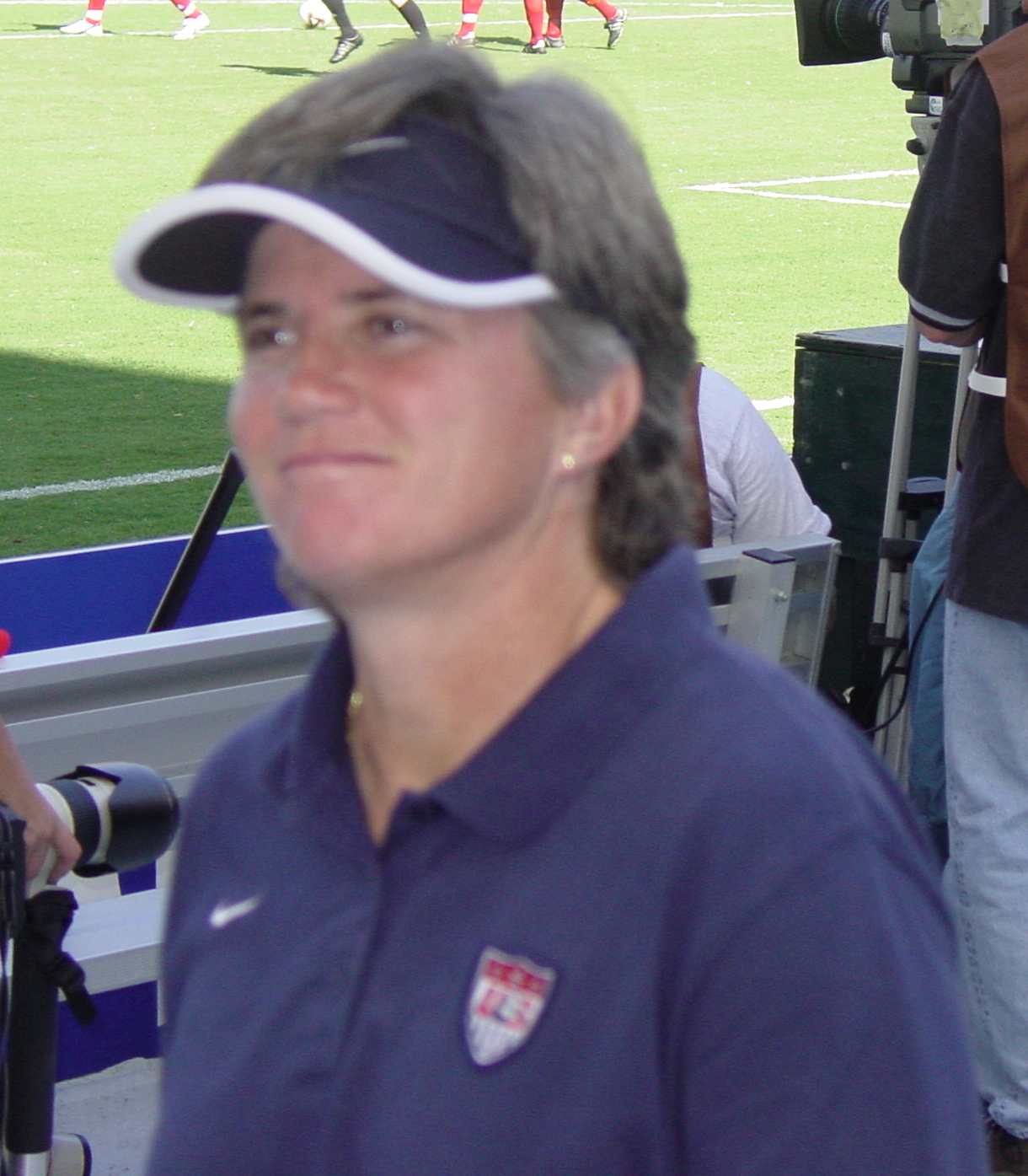
- Heinrichs at the 2003 World Cup

Personal information
- Full name: April Dawn Heinrichs
- Date of birth: February 27, 1964 (age 62)
- Place of birth: Denver, Colorado, U.S.
- Height: 5 ft 4 in (1.63 m)
- Position: Forward

College career
Years	Team	Apps	(Gls)
1983–1986	North Carolina Tar Heels		

Senior career*
Years	Team	Apps	(Gls)
1987	FCF Juventus		
1988–1989	Prato Wonder		

International career
1986–1991	United States	47	(37)

Managerial career
- 1990: Princeton University
- 1991–1995: University of Maryland
- 1996–1999: University of Virginia
- 1995–2000: United States (assistant)
- 2000–2005: United States
- 2006: UC Irvine
- 2011–2012: USSF Technical Director
- * Club domestic league appearances and goals

April Dawn Heinrichs (born February 27, 1964) is an American former soccer player and coach. She was among the first players on the United States women's national soccer team, and was captain of the United States team which won the first ever FIFA Women's World Cup in 1991. She finished her international playing career with 46 caps and 35 goals. Heinrich coached the USA women's team from 2000 to 2004; under her tenure, team USA finished third in the 2003 FIFA Women's World Cup, and won the silver medal at the Sydney 2000 and gold at the Athens 2004 Olympics. In 1998 she became the first female player inducted into the National Soccer Hall of Fame. In January 2011, Heinrichs was appointed Technical Director for women's soccer by the United States Soccer Federation.

== Collegiate record ==
Heinrichs is a 1986 graduate of the UNC where she was named National Player of the Year twice and earned All-American First team honors three times.

== Club career ==
After playing in the Mundialito with the United States national team, Heinrichs spent a short period playing professional soccer in the Italian Serie A with Juventus and then Prato.

== Women's national team record ==
April Heinrichs played for United States women's national soccer team from 1986 through 1991, appeared in 46 matches and scored 35 goals, including fours goals at the 1991 FIFA Women's World Cup in China, where captain Heinrichs formed a forward line dubbed the "triple-edged sword" with Carin Jennings and Michelle Akers-Stahl. Heinrichs remains among the all-time leaders in goals scored for the USA.

=== Matches and goals scored at World Cup ===
April Heinrichs competed in the first FIFA Women's World Cup in 1991, and finished with her team as World Champions; played in five matches and scored four goals.

Key (expand for notes on "world cup and olympic goals")
Location	Geographic location of the venue where the competition occurred
Lineup	Start – played entire match on minute (off player) – substituted on at the minute indicated, and player was substituted off at the same time off minute (on player) – substituted off at the minute indicated, and player was substituted on at the same time (c) – captain
Min	The minute in the match the goal was scored. For list that include caps, blank indicates played in the match but did not score a goal.
Assist/pass	The ball was passed by the player, which assisted in scoring the goal. This column depends on the availability and source of this information.
penalty or pk	Goal scored on penalty-kick which was awarded due to foul by opponent. (Goals scored in penalty-shoot-out, at the end of a tied match after extra-time, are not included.)
Score	The match score after the goal was scored.
Result	The final score. W – match was won L – match was lost to opponent D – match was drawn (W) – penalty-shoot-out was won after a drawn match (L) – penalty-shoot-out was lost after a drawn match
aet	The score at the end of extra-time; the match was tied at the end of 90' regulation
pso	Penalty-shoot-out score shown in parentheses; the match was tied at the end of extra-time
	Pink background color – Olympic women's football tournament
	Blue background color – FIFA women's world cup final tournament

Goal	Match	Date	Location	Opponent	Lineup	Min	Score	Result	Competition
China 1991 FIFA Women's World Cup
	1	1991-11-17	Panyu	Sweden	Start			3–2W	Group match
1	2	1991-11-19	Panyu	Brazil	off 41' (on Chastain)	23	1–0	5–0W	Group match
2	2	1991-11-19	Panyu	Brazil	off 41' (on Chastain)	35	2–0	5–0W	Group match
	3	1991-11-24	Foshan	Chinese Taipei	off 41' (on Belkin)			7–0W	Quarter-final
3	4	1991-11-27	Guangzhou	Germany	Start	54	4–1	5–2W	Semifinal
4	4	1991-11-27	Guangzhou	Germany	Start	75	5–2	5–2W	Semifinal
	5	1991-11-30	Guangzhou	Norway	Start			2–1W	Final

== College head coach ==
She had an 8–6–1 record as head coach at Princeton University in 1990.

Heinrichs guided University of Maryland to a 56–40–7 record from 1991 to 1995, earning Atlantic Coast Conference Coach of the Year honors in 1995 after leading the Terps to their first NCAA Tournament berth.

She was head coach from 1996 to 2000 at University of Virginia, where she recorded a 52–27–7 mark in leading the Cavaliers to four consecutive NCAA Tournament appearances. She led Virginia to a 13–10 record, including a trip to the round of 16 in the NCAA Tournament in 1999 season.

== Coaching U.S. Women's National Team ==
She joined the United States women's national soccer team as an assistant coach in 1995. She became the team's head coach in 2000.

During her tenure, Heinrichs was often criticized for failing to lead the previously unstoppable national squad to a major international championship, but she coached the team to victory at the 2004 Summer Olympics. Heinrichs led the United States to wins in international tournaments such as the Algarve Cup, Four Nations Cup, Gold Cup and a much celebrated return to the podium by winning Gold in Athens. Heinrichs also led her team to the silver medal in the 2000 Summer Olympics and the bronze medal in the 2003 Women's World Cup.

Heinrichs' five years at the helm led to an 87–17–20 record. She resigned as coach on February 15, 2005, and became a consultant for U.S. Soccer.

== Olympic Committee ==
She was named head coach for women's soccer at the University of California, Irvine, on December 19, 2005, and later resigned to accept a position with the U.S. Olympic Committee in Colorado Springs, Colorado.

== Technical Director ==
In January 2011, April Heinrichs was hired by United States Soccer Federation as Technical Director for women's soccer. The appointment, along with Jill Ellis as development director, marks the first time U.S. Soccer had appointed full-time positions to oversee the women's youth national teams program. Besides focusing on technical directions of women's soccer, Heinrichs will oversee the under-20 and under-18 women's youth teams.
