= Joy Fawcett =

American soccer player (born 1968)

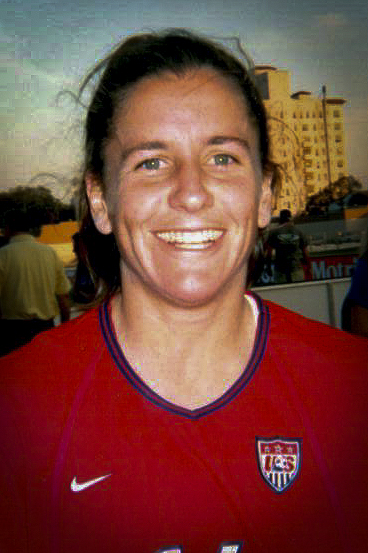

Personal information
- Full name: Joy Lynn Fawcett
- Birth name: Joy Lynn Biefeld
- Date of birth: February 8, 1968 (age 58)
- Place of birth: Inglewood, California, U.S.
- Height: 5 ft 5 in (1.65 m)
- Position: Defender

College career
Years	Team	Apps	(Gls)
1987–1989	California Golden Bears	72	(55)

Senior career*
Years	Team	Apps	(Gls)
- Ajax America
2001–2003	San Diego Spirit	43	(12)

International career
1987–2004	United States	241	(27)

Managerial career
- 1992: Long Beach City Vikings
- 1993–1997: UCLA Bruins
Medal record
Women's football (soccer)
Representing the United States
Olympic Games
Gold medal – first place	1996 Atlanta	Team competition
Gold medal – first place	2004 Athens	Team competition
Silver medal – second place	2000 Sydney	Team competition
FIFA Women's World Cup
Gold medal – first place	1991 China	Team competition
Gold medal – first place	1999 USA	Team competition
Bronze medal – third place	1995 Sweden	Team competition
Bronze medal – third place	2003 USA	Team competition
- * Club domestic league appearances and goals

Joy Lynn Fawcett (née Biefeld; born February 8, 1968) is an American soccer coach and former professional player. She earned 241 caps with the United States women's national soccer team and retired in 2004 as the highest scoring defender in team history. Fawcett was a founding member of the WUSA and was elected for induction into the National Soccer Hall of Fame in 2009. She was in the movie Soccer Mom as herself.

== Youth ==
Fawcett grew up in southern California, where she attended Edison High School in Huntington Beach, California. Her high school team won four league championships. She then attended the University of California, Berkeley where she played on the women's soccer team from 1987 to 1989. She was a three-time, first team All-American. She holds the school record for single-season scoring with 23 goals in 1987. Fawcett graduated from UC Berkeley in 1992 with a BA degree in Physical Education. Cal inducted her into the school's Hall of Fame in October 1997.

== Club ==
Fawcett and forward Carin Jennings both were members of the Manhattan Beach club women's soccer team Ajax in the late 1980s and early 1990s and routinely played at Columbia Park in Torrance, California. In 1992 and 1993, Ajax won the U.S. National Amateur Cup, the women's amateur championship. In 1998, she played for Ajax in the first season of the Women's Premier Soccer League. In 2001, Fawcett signed with the San Diego Spirit in the newly established Women's United Soccer Association. She missed most of the season due to an early season pregnancy. She rebounded in 2002 to lead the team in playing time with 19 games. In 2003, she had ankle injury early in the season but came back to play 18 games and gain WUSA All-Star recognition.

== National team ==
Fawcett helped the U.S. national team win the first women's World Cup, which was held in China in 1991, as well as the 1999 World Cup, held in the United States. She was the only WNT member to play all minutes of the 1995, 1999 and 2003 Women's World Cups as well as the 1996 and 2000 Olympics, and she helped the team win Olympic gold in 1996 and 2004 and silver in 2000. She retired from the WNT in 2004 as the highest-scoring defender for the USWNT.

== International goals ==
No.	Date	Venue	Opponent	Score	Result	Competition
1.	24 November 1991	Foshan, China	Chinese Taipei	7–0	7–0	1991 FIFA Women's World Cup
2.	21 August 1994	Montreal, Canada	Canada	5–0	6–0	1994 CONCACAF Women's Championship
3.	10 June 1995	Helsingborg, Sweden	Australia	2–1	4–1	1995 FIFA Women's World Cup

== Coaching career ==
Fawcett was the head coach of the Long Beach City Vikings women's soccer team in 1992, where she had a 5–9–0 record. She then served as the first coach of the UCLA Bruins women's team from 1993 to 1997.

== Personal life ==
Joy and her husband Walter Fawcett have three daughters, Katelyn Rose (b. May 17, 1994), Carli (b. May 21, 1997), and Madilyn Rae (b. June 5, 2001). Their oldest daughter Katey played soccer for the University of Washington from 2012 to 2015. Her brother Eric Biefeld had a brief career with the United States men's national soccer team. She is also the current assistant soccer coach for the United States women's national deaf soccer team.

Fawcett appeared in the HBO documentary Dare to Dream: The Story of the U.S. Women's Soccer Team.

Fawcett is a part of the ownership group of Angel City FC of the National Women's Soccer League.

== Honors and awards ==
=== United States Women's National Team ===
- World Cup: 1991, 1999
- Summer Olympic Games gold medal: 1996, 2004

=== Ajax (Manhattan Beach) ===
- U.S. National Amateur Cup: 1992, 1993

=== Individual ===
- All-Star, Women's United Soccer Association: 2003
- Inductee, US Soccer Hall of Fame: 2009
