= Brazil women's national football team results (1986–1999) =

- Win Draw Loss

This is a list of the Brazil women's national football team results from 1986 to 1999.

== Results ==
=== 1986 ===
22 July 1986 1986 Mundialito	United States	2–1	Brazil	Jesolo, Italy
	Pickering; Heinrichs		Pelézinha	Stadium: Stadio Armando Picchi

24 July 1986 1986 Mundialito	China	1–1	Brazil	Jesolo, Italy
	Goal		Goal	Stadium: Stadio Armando Picchi

=== 1988 ===
1 June 1988 1988 FIFA Women's Invitation Tournament	Australia	1–0	Brazil	Jiangmen, China
	Riddington			Referee: Chen Shengcai (CHN)

3 June 1988 1988 FIFA Women's Invitation Tournament	Brazil	2–1	Norway	Jiangmen, China
	Roseli; Michael		Scheel	Referee: Alfred Kleinaitis (USA)

5 June 1988 1988 FIFA Women's Invitation Tournament	Brazil	9–0	Thailand	Jiangmen, China
	Sissi; Roseli (2 goals); Cebola (4 goals); Lúcia; Michael			Referee: Chen Shengcai (CHN)

8 June 1988 1988 FIFA Women's Invitation Tournament	Brazil	2–1	Netherlands	Foshan, China
	Cebola; Sissi		De Bakker	Stadium: New Plaza Stadium; Referee: Richard Lorenc (AUS)

10 June 1988 1988 FIFA Women's Invitation Tournament	Brazil	1–2	Norway	Guangzhou, China
	Sissi		Scheel (2 goals)	Stadium: Tianhe Stadium; Referee: John Basford Meachin (CAN)

12 June 1988 1988 FIFA Women's Invitation Tournament	China	0–0 (3–4 p)	Brazil	Guangzhou, China
				Stadium: Tianhe Stadium; Referee: Egil Nervik (NOR)
	Penalties
	Wu Weiying (penalty scored); Niu Lijie (penalty scored); Chen Xia (penalty scored); ? (penalty missed)		(penalty scored) Roseli; (penalty missed) Fanta; (penalty scored) Pelézinha; (penalty scored) Sandra; (penalty scored) Michael

=== 1991 ===
28 April 1991 1991 South American Women's Football Championship	Brazil	6–1	Chile	Maringá, Brazil
	Roseli; Adriana (2 goals); Márcia Taffarel; Elane; Marisa		Cruz	Stadium: Estádio Willie Davids; Referee: Carlos Biscay (ARG)

5 May 1991 1991 South American Women's Football Championship	Brazil	6–1	Venezuela	Maringá, Brazil
	Marcinha (2 goals); Adriana (2 goals); Fia; Roseli		Infante	Stadium: Estádio Willie Davids; Referee: Efigenio Verdun (PAR)

17 November 1991 1991 FIFA Women's World Cup Group B	Japan	0–1	Brazil	Foshan, China
19:45		Report	Elane 4'	Stadium: New Plaza Stadium; Attendance: 14,000; Referee: Lu Jun (China PR)

19 November 1991 1991 FIFA Women's World Cup Group B	Brazil	0–5	United States	Guangzhou, China
19:45		Report	Heinrichs 23', 35'; Jennings 38'; Akers-Stahl 39'; Hamm 63'	Stadium: Ying Tung Stadium; Attendance: 15,500; Referee: Vadim Zhuk (Soviet Union)

21 November 1991 1991 FIFA Women's World Cup Group B	Brazil	0–2	Sweden	Guangzhou, China
15:30		Report	Sundhage 42' (pen.); Hedberg 56'	Stadium: Ying Tung Stadium; Attendance: 12,000; Referee: Lu Jun (China PR)

=== 1995 ===
8 January 1995 1995 South American Women's Football Championship	Brazil	13–0	Ecuador	Uberlândia, Brazil
16:30 UTC-3	Pretinha (4 goals); Cenira; Roseli; Michael (2 goals); Sissi (2 goals); Russa (3 goals)			Stadium: Parque do Sabiá; Referee: Nestor Mondría (Chile)

10 January 1995 1995 South American Women's Football Championship	Brazil	6–1	Chile	Uberlândia, Brazil
20:00 UTC-3	Sissi (2 goals); Roseli; Cenira; Michael (2 goals)		Bravo	Stadium: Parque do Sabiá; Referee: Marco Ernesto Aguas (Argentina)

14 January 1995 1995 South American Women's Football Championship	Brazil	8–0	Argentina	Uberlândia, Brazil
16:00 UTC-3	Sissi 16', 31', 57' (pen.), 83' (pen.); Roseli 43'; Pretinha 47', 84'; Elane 64'	Report		Stadium: Parque do Sabiá; Referee: Nestor Mondría (Chile)

18 January 1995 1995 South American Women's Football Championship	Brazil	15–0	Bolivia	Uberlândia, Brazil
	Roseli (3 goals); Márcia Taffarel; Michael (2 goals); Sissi (4 goals); Elane; Duda; Bel; Cenira (2 goals)			Stadium: Parque do Sabiá; Referee: Luis Olivetto (Argentina)

22 January 1995 1995 South American Women's Football Championship	Brazil	2–0	Argentina	Uberlândia, Brazil
16:00 UTC-3	Michael 4'; Roseli 50'	Report		Stadium: Parque do Sabiá; Attendance: 50,000; Referee: Nestor Mondría (Chile)

9 April 1995 Torneio Cidade de Uberlândia	Brazil	4–0	(São Paulo (state)) São Paulo XI	Uberlândia, Brazil
	Sissi (2 goals); Roseli; Elane			Stadium: Parque do Sabiá; Referee: Ângela Lira (Brazil)

11 April 1995 Torneio Cidade de Uberlândia	Brazil	4–1	Argentina	Uberlândia, Brazil
	Sissi (2 goals); Elane; Cenira		Elane (o.g.)	Stadium: Parque do Sabiá; Referee: Selma Lima (Brazil)

13 April 1995 Torneio Cidade de Uberlândia	Brazil	3–0	Australia	Uberlândia, Brazil
	Sissi; Roseli (2 goals)			Stadium: Parque do Sabiá; Referee: Cláudia Guedes (Brazil)

16 April 1995 Torneio Cidade de Uberlândia	Brazil	2–3	Australia	Uberlândia, Brazil
	Sissi; Roseli		Gegenhuber; Lembryk; Casagrande	Stadium: Parque do Sabiá; Referee: Cláudia Guedes (Brazil)

12 May 1995 Friendly	United States	3–0	Brazil	Tacoma, United States
	Hamm (2 goals); Venturini			Stadium: Franklin Pierce High School; Referee: Rene Parra (Canada)

12 May 1995 Friendly	United States	4–1	Brazil	Portland, United States
	Milbrett; Akers-Stahl (2 goals); Jennings		Sissi	Stadium: Merlo Field

5 June 1995 1995 FIFA Women's World Cup Group A	Sweden	0–1	Brazil	Helsingborg, Sweden
18:00		Report	Roseli 37'	Stadium: Olympia; Attendance: 14,500; Referee: Sonia Denoncourt (Canada)

7 June 1995 1995 FIFA Women's World Cup Group A	Brazil	1–2	Japan	Karlstad, Sweden
19:00	Pretinha 7'	Report	Noda 13', 45'	Stadium: Tingvalla IP; Attendance: 2,286; Referee: Catherine Leann Hepburn (United States)

9 June 1995 1995 FIFA Women's World Cup Group A	Brazil	1–6	Germany	Karlstad, Sweden
19:00	Roseli 19'	Report	Prinz 5'; Meinert 22'; Wiegmann 42' (pen.); Mohr 78', 89'; Bernhard 90'	Stadium: Tingvalla IP; Attendance: 3,203; Referee: Alain Hamer (Luxembourg)

=== 1996 ===
14 January 1996 Torneio do Brasil	Brazil	7–0	Ukraine	Campinas, Brazil
	Pretinha (4 goals); ?; ?; ?			Stadium: Brinco de Ouro

16 January 1996 Torneio do Brasil	Brazil	2–3	United States	Campinas, Brazil
	Sissi; Elane		Hamm; Jennings; Milbrett	Stadium: Brinco de Ouro

18 January 1996 Torneio do Brasil	Brazil	4–0	Russia	Campinas, Brazil
	?; ?; ?; ?			Stadium: Brinco de Ouro

20 January 1996 Torneio do Brasil	Brazil	1–1 (2–3 p)	United States	Campinas, Brazil
	Pretinha		Milbrett	Stadium: Brinco de Ouro
	Penalties
	Sissi (penalty missed); Elane (penalty scored); Russa (penalty missed); Formiga (penalty scored); Pretinha (penalty missed)		(penalty scored) Akers-Stahl; (penalty missed) Overbeck; (penalty scored) Milbrett; (penalty scored) Chastain

21 April 1996 Friendly	Brazil	6–1	Hungary	Águas de Lindóia, Brazil
				Stadium: Estádio Leonardo Barbieri

25 April 1996 Friendly	Brazil	3–0	Hungary	Campinas, Brazil
				Stadium: Estádio Moisés Lucarelli

28 April 1996 Friendly	Brazil	2–0	Hungary	Rio Claro, Brazil
				Stadium: Estádio Augusto Schmidt Filho

5 May 1996 Friendly	Brazil	6–1	Hungary	Capivari, Brazil
				Stadium: Estádio Carlos Colnaghi

4 July 1996 Friendly	Canada	1–2	Brazil	Rapid City, United States
	Helland 35'		?; ?

21 July 1996 1996 Olympics	Norway	2–2	Brazil	Washington, D.C., United States
15:00	Medalen 32'; Aarønes 68'	Report	Pretinha 57', 89'	Stadium: RFK Stadium; Attendance: 45,946; Referee: José María García-Aranda (Spain)

23 July 1996 1996 Olympics	Brazil	2–0	Japan	Birmingham, United States
16:30	Kátia Cilene 68'; Pretinha 78'	Report		Stadium: Legion Field; Attendance: 26,111; Referee: Ingrid Jonsson (Sweden)

25 July 1996 1996 Olympics	Brazil	1–1	Germany	Birmingham, United States
18:30	Sissi 53'	Report	Wunderlich 4'	Stadium: Legion Field; Attendance: 28,319; Referee: Sonia Denoncourt (Canada)

28 July 1996 1996 Olympics	China	3–2	Brazil	Athens, United States
	Qingmei 5'; Haiying 83', 90'	Report	Roseli 67'; Pretinha 72'	Stadium: Sanford Stadium; Attendance: 64,196; Referee: Ingrid Jonsson (Sweden)

1 August 1996 1996 Olympics	Brazil	0–2	Norway	Athens, United States
		Report	Aarønes 21', 25'	Stadium: Sanford Stadium; Attendance: 76,489; Referee: Ingrid Jonsson (Sweden)

10 December 1996 Friendly	Brazil	5–0	Scotland	São Paulo, Brazil
				Stadium: Parque São Jorge

12 December 1996 Friendly	Brazil	6–0	Scotland	Itu, Brazil
				Stadium: Estádio Novelli Jr.

14 December 1996 Friendly	Brazil	7–1	Scotland	Jundiaí, Brazil
				Stadium: Estádio Jayme Cintra

=== 1997 ===
6 June 1997 Friendly	Netherlands	1–2	Brazil	Tilburg, Netherlands
	Van Eijk		Roseli; Pretinha	Stadium: Willem II Stadion; Referee: Regien Belksma-Konink (Netherlands)

7 June 1997 Friendly	Netherlands	1–0	Brazil	Netherlands
	?

11 December 1997 Friendly	Brazil	1–2	United States	Taubaté, Brazil
	Pretinha		Hamm; Foudy	Stadium: Joaquinzão; Referee: Cláudia Guedes

13 December 1997 Friendly	Brazil	1–0	United States	São Paulo, Brazil
	Roseli			Stadium: Estádio do Canindé

=== 1998 ===
2 March 1998 1998 South American Women's Football Championship	Brazil	15–0	Peru	Mar del Plata, Argentina
16:00 (UTC-3)	Sissi (2 goals); Pretinha (3 goals); Kátia Cilene (3 goals); Roseli (3 goals); Elane (3 goals); Maycon			Stadium: Estadio José María Minella; Referee: Claudio Martín (Argentina)

5 March 1998 1998 South American Women's Football Championship	Brazil	12–1	Colombia	Mar del Plata, Argentina
17:10 (UTC-3)	Kátia Cilene (4 goals); Sissi (2 goals); Roseli (2 goals); Pretinha (4 goals)		Díaz	Stadium: Estadio José María Minella; Referee: Rafael Jarrín (Ecuador)

6 March 1998 1998 South American Women's Football Championship	Brazil	14–0	Venezuela	Mar del Plata, Argentina
16:00 (UTC-3)	Roseli (3 goals); Kátia Cilene (4 goals); Nenê; Pretinha; Elsi; Suzana (2 goals); Elane; Maycon			Stadium: Estadio José María Minella; Referee: Claudio Martín (Argentina)

10 March 1998 1998 South American Women's Football Championship	Brazil	7–0	Chile	Mar del Plata, Argentina
16:00 (UTC-3)	Roseli (2 goals); Nenê; Sissi (3 goals)			Stadium: Estadio José María Minella; Referee: Edgar Solíz (Bolivia)

13 March 1998 1998 South American Women's Football Championship	Brazil	11–1	Ecuador	Mar del Plata, Argentina
16:00 (UTC-3)	Cidinha; Sissi (3 goals); Elane (2 goals); Roseli (3 goals); Kátia Cilene; Pretinha		Villón	Stadium: Estadio José María Minella; Referee: Oliver Viera (Uruguay)

15 March 1998 1998 South American Women's Football Championship	Brazil	7–1	Argentina	Mar del Plata, Argentina
12:10 (UTC-3)	Roseli 10', 21' (pen.), 59'; Formiga 18' (pen.); Pretinha 54'; Cidinha 65'; Sissi 76'	Report	Gerez 58'	Stadium: Estadio José María Minella; Attendance: 2,500; Referee: Martha Toro (Colombia)

15 September 1998 1998 Women's U.S. Cup	Brazil	2–2	Russia	Oneonta, United States
	Pretinha (2 goals)		Barbashina; Letyushova	Attendance: 1,872; Referee: Al Mazzone (United States)

18 September 1998 1998 Women's U.S. Cup	Brazil	11–0	Mexico	Rochester, United States
	Roseli (6 goals); Pretinha (4 goals); Nenê			Attendance: 12,052; Referee: Gerri Cory (United States)

20 September 1998 1998 Women's U.S. Cup	United States	3–0	Brazil	Richmond, United States
	Akers; Fawcett; Keller			Stadium: University of Richmond Stadium; Attendance: 9,147; Referee: Sandra Hunt (United States)

=== 1999 ===
22 May 1999 Friendly	United States	3–0	Brazil	Orlando, United States
	Hamm; Lilly; Milbret			Stadium: Citrus Bowl; Referee: Ali Saheli (United States)

3 June 1999 Friendly	Canada	2–4	Brazil	Portland, United States
	Suzana (o.g.); Burtini		Sissi (3 goals); Pretinha	Stadium: Civic Stadium; Referee: Mohammed Sasakhaneh (United States)

6 June 1999 Friendly	Brazil	3–1	Australia	Portland, United States
	Pretinha (2 goals); Nenê		Murray	Stadium: Civic Stadium; Referee: Kari Seitz (United States)

19 June 1999 1999 FIFA Women's World Cup Group B	Brazil	7–1	Mexico	East Rutherford, United States
17:30 EDT (UTC−4)	Pretinha 3', 12', 90+1'; Sissi 29', 42', 50'; Kátia Cilene 35' (pen.)	Report	Domínguez 10'	Stadium: Giants Stadium; Attendance: 78,972; Referee: Nicole Petignat (Switzerland)

24 June 1999 1999 FIFA Women's World Cup Group B	Brazil	2–0	Italy	Chicago, United States
17:00 CDT (UTC−5)	Sissi 3', 63'	Report		Stadium: Soldier Field; Attendance: 65,080; Referee: Gitte Nielsen (Denmark)

27 June 1999 1999 FIFA Women's World Cup Group B	Germany	3–3	Brazil	Landover, United States
13:30 EDT (UTC−4)	Prinz 8'; Wiegmann 46' (pen.); Jones 58'	Report	Kátia Cilene 15'; Sissi 20'; Maycon 90+4'	Stadium: Jack Kent Cooke Stadium; Attendance: 22,109; Referee: Im Eun-ju (South Korea)

1 July 1999 1999 FIFA Women's World Cup Quarterfinals	Brazil	4–3 (asdet)	Nigeria	Landover, United States
21:30 EDT (UTC−4)	Cidinha 4', 22'; Nenê 35'; Sissi 104'	Report	Emeafu 63'; Okosieme 72'; Egbe 85'	Stadium: Jack Kent Cooke Stadium; Attendance: 54,462; Referee: Virginia Tovar (Mexico)

4 July 1999 1999 FIFA Women's World Cup Semifinals	United States	3–0	Brazil	Stanford, United States
3:30 PDT (UTC−7)	Parlow 5'; Akers 80' (pen.)	Report		Stadium: Stanford Stadium; Attendance: 73,123; Referee: Katriina Elovirta (Finland)

10 July 1999 1999 FIFA Women's World Cup Third place match	Brazil	0–0 (a.e.t.) (5–4 p)	Norway	Pasadena, United States
10:15 PDT (UTC−7)		Report		Stadium: Rose Bowl; Attendance: 90,185; Referee: Im Eun-ju (South Korea)
	Penalties
	Pretinha (penalty missed); Cidinha (penalty scored); Kátia Cilene (penalty scored); Maycon (penalty scored); Nenê (penalty scored); Formiga (penalty scored)		(penalty scored) Riise; (penalty scored) Pettersen; (penalty missed) Jørgensen; (penalty scored) Sandaune; (penalty scored) S. Gulbrandsen; (penalty missed) Aarønes

26 September 1999 Friendly	United States	6–0	Brazil	Denver, United States
	Milbrett (2 goals); MacMillan (2 goals); Parlow; Fotopoulos			Stadium: Mile High Stadium; Referee: Sandra Hunt (United States)

3 October 1999 1999 Women's U.S. Cup	Brazil	3–1	Finland	Columbus, United States
13:30 EDT (UTC−4)	Maycon 42'; Roseli 45', 78'		Heikari 68'	Stadium: Crew Stadium; Attendance: 23,131; Referee: Kari Seitz (United States)

7 October 1999 1999 Women's U.S. Cup	Brazil	4–0	South Korea	Kansas City, United States
17:00 CDT (UTC−5)	Roseli 39', 53'; Raquel 54', 74'			Stadium: Arrowhead Stadium; Attendance: 36,405; Referee: Michael Kennedy (United States)

10 October 1999 1999 Women's U.S. Cup	United States	4–2	Brazil	Louisville, United States
13:00 EDT (UTC−4)	Hamm 18', 60'; Lilly 38', 88'		Nilda 21', 30'	Stadium: Papa John's Cardinal Stadium; Attendance: 35,211; Referee: Sonia Denoncourt (Canada)
