= Brazil at the FIFA Women's World Cup =

Women's national football team

The Brazil women's national football team has represented Brazil at the FIFA Women's World Cup on all ten occasions to date. As the most successful women's national football team in South America, Brazil is also the best-performing South American team at the FIFA Women's World Cup, reaching two podium finishes (in 1999 and 2007). Brazil will host the 2027 FIFA Women's World Cup.

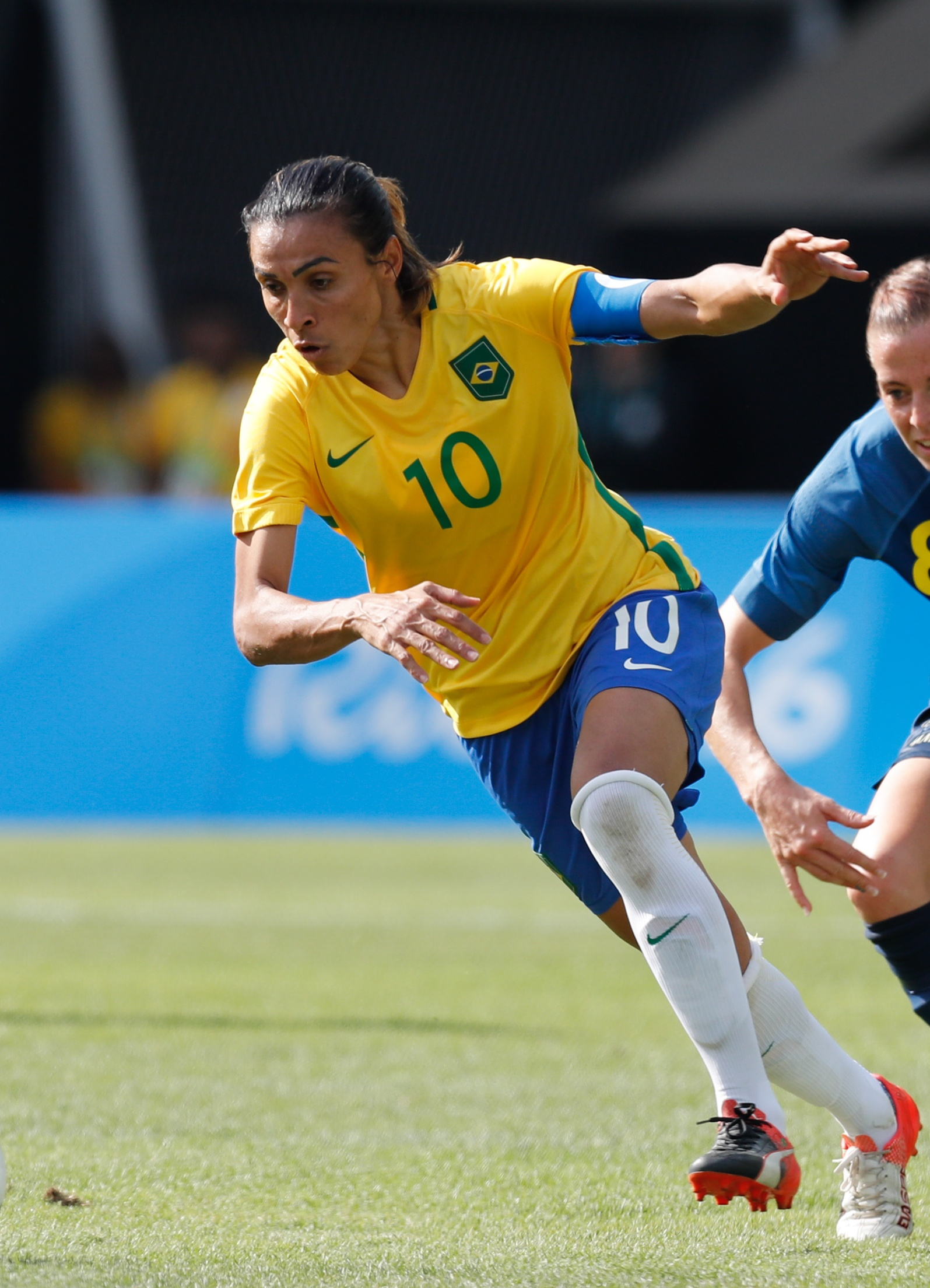
Marta - Record goal scorer at Women's World Cup

== FIFA World Cup record ==
| Year | Result | Position | Matches | Wins | Draws | Losses | GF | GA |
|---|---|---|---|---|---|---|---|---|
| (China) 1991 | Group stage | 9th | 3 | 1 | 0 | 2 | 1 | 7 |
| (Sweden) 1995 | Group stage | 9th | 3 | 1 | 0 | 2 | 3 | 8 |
| (United States) 1999 | Third Place | 3rd | 6 | 3 | 2 | 1 | 16 | 9 |
| (United States) 2003 | Quarter-finals | 5th | 4 | 2 | 1 | 1 | 9 | 4 |
| (China) 2007 | Runners-up | 2nd | 6 | 5 | 0 | 1 | 17 | 4 |
| (Germany) 2011 | Quarter-finals | 5th | 4 | 3 | 1 | 0 | 9 | 2 |
| (Canada) 2015 | Round of 16 | 9th | 4 | 3 | 0 | 1 | 4 | 1 |
| (France) 2019 | Round of 16 | 10th | 4 | 2 | 0 | 2 | 7 | 5 |
| (Australia) (New Zealand) 2023 | Group stage | 18th | 3 | 1 | 1 | 1 | 5 | 2 |
| (Brazil) 2027 | Qualified as hosts | | | | | | | |
| (Costa Rica) (Jamaica) (Mexico) (United States) 2031 | To be determined | | | | | | | |
| (United Kingdom) 2035 | To be determined | | | | | | | |
| Total | 10/10 | | 37 | 21 | 5 | 11 | 71 | 42 |

== 1991 World Cup ==
For the World Cup Women's Women qualified as South American Champion. For this they had to play in two games against Venezuela and Chile and won both games (6: 0 and 6: 1).

On November 17, 1991, they played in Foshan their first World Cup match and won against Japan 1–0. Elane scored the first World Cup goal for the Brazilians. In the second game followed then a 0: 5 against the United States. After a 0–2 draw against Sweden in the last group match Brazil became group third and dropped out with it.

=== Group B ===
| Pos | Team | Pld | W | D | L | GF | GA | GD | Pts | Qualification |
|---|---|---|---|---|---|---|---|---|---|---|
| 1 | United States | 3 | 3 | 0 | 0 | 11 | 2 | +9 | 6 | Advance to knockout stage |
| 2 | Sweden | 3 | 2 | 0 | 1 | 12 | 3 | +9 | 4 | Advance to knockout stage |
| 3 | Brazil | 3 | 1 | 0 | 2 | 1 | 7 | −6 | 2 | |
| 4 | Japan | 3 | 0 | 0 | 3 | 0 | 12 | −12 | 0 | |

Source: FIFA
17 November 1991
19:45

| Japan | 0–1 | Brazil |
|---|---|---|
| | Report | Elane 4' |

New Plaza Stadium, Foshan
Attendance: 14,000
Referee: Lu Jun (China PR)

19 November 1991
19:45

| Brazil | 0–5 | United States |
|---|---|---|
| | Report | Heinrichs 23', 35'; Jennings 38'; Akers-Stahl 39'; Hamm 63' |

Ying Tung Stadium, Guangzhou
Attendance: 15,500
Referee: Vadim Zhuk (Soviet Union)

21 November 1991
15:30

| Brazil | 0–2 | Sweden |
|---|---|---|
| | Report | Sundhage 42' (pen.); Hedberg 56' |

Ying Tung Stadium, Guangzhou
Attendance: 12,000
Referee: Lu Jun (China PR)

== 1995 World Cup ==
The Brazilians for the world cup through South American champions. With four wins against Argentina, Chile, Ecuador and Bolivia Brazil became group winners against Argentina, but then had to compete again against Argentina in the final and also won this 2–0.

At the World Cup, Brazil started again with a 1–0 victory, this time against Sweden. Then they lost against Japan with 1: 2 and Germany with 1: 6. Thus, Brazil equalized with Japan, but the worse goal difference only the fourth place.

=== Group A ===
| Pos | Team | Pld | W | D | L | GF | GA | GD | Pts | Qualification |
|---|---|---|---|---|---|---|---|---|---|---|
| 1 | Germany | 3 | 2 | 0 | 1 | 9 | 4 | +5 | 6 | Advance to knockout stage |
| 2 | Sweden (H) | 3 | 2 | 0 | 1 | 5 | 3 | +2 | 6 | Advance to knockout stage |
| 3 | Japan | 3 | 1 | 0 | 2 | 2 | 4 | −2 | 3 | Advance to knockout stage |
| 4 | Brazil | 3 | 1 | 0 | 2 | 3 | 8 | −5 | 3 | |

Source: FIFA
(H) Hosts
5 June 1995
18:00

| Sweden | 0–1 | Brazil |
|---|---|---|
| | Report | Roseli 37' |

Olympia, Helsingborg
Attendance: 14,500
Referee: Sonia Denoncourt (Canada)

7 June 1995
19:00

| Brazil | 1–2 | Japan |
|---|---|---|
| Pretinha 7' | Report | Noda 13', 45' |

Tingvalla IP, Karlstad
Attendance: 2,286
Referee: Catherine Leann Hepburn (United States)

9 June 1995
19:00

| Brazil | 1–6 | Germany |
|---|---|---|
| Roseli 19' | Report | Prinz 5'; Meinert 22'; Wiegmann 42' (pen.); Mohr 78', 89'; Bernhard 90' |

Tingvalla IP, Karlstad
Attendance: 3,203
Referee: Alain Hamer (Luxembourg)

== 1999 World Cup ==
All CONMEBOL members had registered for the third World Cup or qualifying South America Champion, so they played in two groups. Brazil prevailed in its group with four wins against Peru, Colombia, Chile and Venezuela. Ecuador were defeated 11–1 in the semi-finals and 7–1 in the final. Argentina then failed to win against Mexico in the Inter-American play-offs, which made Mexico the first to qualify.

Mexico was then in the USA kick-off opponents of Brazil and lost 1–7. Pretinha and Sissi scored three goals each. This time, however, Brazil also won the second game: Italy was defeated 2–0. After a 3: 3 draw against Germany, Brazil were group winners on goal difference and scored in the quarter-finals Nigeria. After 35 minutes it was 3-0 for Brazil, but since the Africans scored in the second half and three goals, there was an extension. In this Sissi then succeeded the Golden goal for 4: 3. In the semifinals against the host USA was then lost but with 0: 2. The USA then became World Champion for the second time. Brazil reached third place in the small final against defeated defending champion Norway by a penalty shoot-out win.

=== Group B ===
| Pos | Team | Pld | W | D | L | GF | GA | GD | Pts | Qualification |
|---|---|---|---|---|---|---|---|---|---|---|
| 1 | Brazil | 3 | 2 | 1 | 0 | 12 | 4 | +8 | 7 | Advance to knockout stage |
| 2 | Germany | 3 | 1 | 2 | 0 | 10 | 4 | +6 | 5 | Advance to knockout stage |
| 3 | Italy | 3 | 1 | 1 | 1 | 3 | 3 | 0 | 4 | |
| 4 | Mexico | 3 | 0 | 0 | 3 | 1 | 15 | −14 | 0 | |

Source: FIFA
June 19, 1999
17:30 EDT (UTC−4)

| Brazil | 7–1 | Mexico |
|---|---|---|
| Pretinha 3', 12', 90+1'; Sissi 29', 42', 50'; Kátia 35' (pen.) | Report | Domínguez 10' |

Giants Stadium, East Rutherford
Attendance: 78,972
Referee: Nicole Petignat (Switzerland)

June 24, 1999
17:00 CDT (UTC−5)

| Brazil | 2–0 | Italy |
|---|---|---|
| Sissi 3', 63' | Report |

Soldier Field, Chicago
Attendance: 65,080
Referee: Gitte Nielsen (Denmark)

June 27, 1999
13:30 EDT (UTC−4)

| Germany | 3–3 | Brazil |
|---|---|---|
| Prinz 8'; Wiegmann 46' (pen.); Jones 58' | Report | Kátia 15'; Sissi 20'; Maycon 90+4' |

Jack Kent Cooke Stadium, Landover
Attendance: 22,109
Referee: Im Eun-ju (South Korea)

=== Quarter-finals ===
July 1, 1999
21:30 EDT (UTC−4)

| Brazil | 4–3 (a.e.t./g.g.) | Nigeria |
|---|---|---|
| Cidinha 4', 22'; Nenê 35'; Sissi 104' | Report | Emeafu 63'; Okosieme 72'; Egbe 85' |

Jack Kent Cooke Stadium, Landover
Attendance: 54,642
Referee: Virginia Tovar (Mexico)

=== Semi-finals ===
July 4, 1999
13:30 PDT (UTC−7)

| United States | 2–0 | Brazil |
|---|---|---|
| Parlow 5'; Akers 80' (pen.) | Report |

Stanford Stadium, Stanford
Attendance: 73,123
Referee: Katriina Elovirta (Finland)

=== Third place play-off ===
July 10, 1999
10:15 PDT (UTC−7)

| Brazil | 0–0 (a.e.t.) | Norway |
|---|---|---|
| | Report |
Penalties
| Pretinha (penalty missed); Cidinha (penalty scored); Kátia (penalty scored); Maycon (penalty scored); Nenê (penalty scored); Formiga (penalty scored) | 5–4 | (penalty scored) Riise; (penalty scored) Pettersen; (penalty missed) Jørgensen; (penalty scored) Sandaune; (penalty scored) S. Gulbrandsen; (penalty missed) Aarønes |

Rose Bowl, Pasadena
Attendance: 90,185
Referee: Im Eun-ju (South Korea)

== 2003 World Cup ==
Actually, the 2003 World Cup should take place again in People's Republic of China. Due to the SARS epidemic, the tournament was temporarily relocated to the United States. Thus the World Cup took place for the second time in the USA. In the Qualification, which was again held as South American champions, Brazil only had to compete in the last four rounds, for which the other three teams will qualify first had. With three wins against Argentina, Colombia and Peru qualified Brazil as a South American champions for the World Cup, but also the runners-up Argentina could book the World Cup ticket.

In the US, they met in the first group match South Korea and won 3–0. Against Norway then followed a 4–1 win and with a 1–1 draw against France was reached as a group first the quarterfinals. Here Sweden was the opponent and with a 1: 2 difference Brazil. Sweden then reached the final, but then lost by the first Golden goal in a women's World Cup game against Germany with the German women for the first time became world champion.

=== Group B ===
| Pos | Team | Pld | W | D | L | GF | GA | GD | Pts | Qualification |
|---|---|---|---|---|---|---|---|---|---|---|
| 1 | Brazil | 3 | 2 | 1 | 0 | 8 | 2 | +6 | 7 | Advance to knockout stage |
| 2 | Norway | 3 | 2 | 0 | 1 | 10 | 5 | +5 | 6 | Advance to knockout stage |
| 3 | France | 3 | 1 | 1 | 1 | 2 | 3 | −1 | 4 | |
| 4 | South Korea | 3 | 0 | 0 | 3 | 1 | 11 | −10 | 0 | |

Source: FIFA
September 21, 2003
15:15 EDT (UTC−4)

| Brazil | 3–0 | South Korea |
|---|---|---|
| Marta 14' (pen.); Kátia 55', 62' | Report |

Robert F. Kennedy Memorial Stadium, Washington, D.C.
Attendance: 34,144
Referee: Tammy Ogston (Australia)

September 24, 2003
17:00 EDT (UTC−4)

| Norway | 1–4 | Brazil |
|---|---|---|
| Pettersen 45' | Report | Daniela 26'; Rosana 37'; Marta 59'; Kátia 68' |

Robert F. Kennedy Memorial Stadium, Washington, D.C.
Attendance: 16,316
Referee: Xonam Agboyi (Togo)

September 27, 2003
12:45 EDT (UTC−4)

| France | 1–1 | Brazil |
|---|---|---|
| Pichon 90+2' | Report | Kátia 58' |

Robert F. Kennedy Memorial Stadium, Washington, D.C.
Attendance: 17,618
Referee: Cristina Ionescu (Romania)

=== Quarter-finals ===
October 1, 2003
16:30 EDT (UTC−4)

| Brazil | 1–2 | Sweden |
|---|---|---|
| Marta 44' (pen.) | Report | Svensson 23'; Andersson 53' |

Gillette Stadium, Foxborough
Attendance: 25,103
Referee: Zhang Dongqing (China PR)

== 2007 World Cup ==
Four years later, the World Cup took place for the second time in the People's Republic of China. In the 2006 South American Women's Football Championship, which once again served as Qualification, the 10 CONMEBOL members initially played four teams in two groups of five for the finals. Brazil first met Paraguay, Venezuela, Peru and Bolivia. With four victories, Brazil reached the final round, but was there only second behind Argentina in front of Uruguay and Paraguay. With that Argentina and Brazil drove again to the World Cup.

In the final, they met in the first game New Zealand and won 5: 0. Against hosts China then followed a 4-0 and Denmark was defeated 1–0. This Brazil reached the quarter-finals as group winners. In a varied game, Australia was beaten 3–2 to reach the semi-final against the USA. Here, Brazil managed to give the USA their highest international defeat 4–0. Brazil reached its first World Cup final for the first time, making it the third nation after Germany and Sweden to do so for men and women. The opponent was defending champion Germany, who had reached the final without conceding, scoring the highest ever World Cup win of the season with a 11–0 draw against Argentina in the opening match. After a goalless first half Birgit Prinz succeeded in the 52nd minute with their 14th goal of the World Cup 1–0 lead. In the 64th minute Cristiane was fouled in the German penalty area. However, Marta's penalties failed Nadine Angerer). The following attacks could not use the Brazilians in goals, as the German defense was safe. Four minutes from time, the decision was made: After a corner, Simone Laudehr headed the ball 2–0. Thus defended the German team as the first in a women's World Cup title. The runner-up is the best placement so far for Brazil. In addition, Marta received the Golden Boot as the top scorer and the Golden Ball as the best player of the tournament.

=== Group D ===
| Pos | Team | Pld | W | D | L | GF | GA | GD | Pts | Qualification |
|---|---|---|---|---|---|---|---|---|---|---|
| 1 | Brazil | 3 | 3 | 0 | 0 | 10 | 0 | +10 | 9 | Advance to knockout stage |
| 2 | China (H) | 3 | 2 | 0 | 1 | 5 | 6 | −1 | 6 | Advance to knockout stage |
| 3 | Denmark | 3 | 1 | 0 | 2 | 4 | 4 | 0 | 3 | |
| 4 | New Zealand | 3 | 0 | 0 | 3 | 0 | 9 | −9 | 0 | |

Source: FIFA
(H) Hosts
12 September 2007
17:00

| New Zealand | 0–5 | Brazil |
|---|---|---|
| | Report | Daniela 10'; Cristiane 54'; Marta 74', 90+3'; Renata Costa 86' |

Wuhan Sports Centre Stadium, Wuhan
Attendance: 50,800
Referee: Pannipar Kamnueng (Thailand)

15 September 2007
20:00

| Brazil | 4–0 | China |
|---|---|---|
| Marta 42', 70'; Cristiane 47', 48' | Report |

Wuhan Sports Centre Stadium, Wuhan
Attendance: 54,000
Referee: Jennifer Bennett (United States)

20 September 2007
20:00

| Brazil | 1–0 | Denmark |
|---|---|---|
| Pretinha 90+1' | Report |

Yellow Dragon Stadium, Hangzhou
Attendance: 43,817
Referee: Kari Seitz (United States)

=== Quarter-finals ===
23 September 2007
20:00

| Brazil | 3–2 | Australia |
|---|---|---|
| Formiga 4'; Marta 23' (pen.); Cristiane 75' | Report | De Vanna 36'; Colthorpe 68' |

Tianjin Olympic Center Stadium, Tianjin
Attendance: 35,061
Referee: Christine Beck (Germany)

=== Semi-finals ===
27 September 2007
20:00

| United States | 0–4 | Brazil |
|---|---|---|
| | Report | Osborne 20' (o.g.); Marta 27', 79'; Cristiane 56' |

Yellow Dragon Stadium, Hangzhou
Attendance: 47,818
Referee: Nicole Petignat (Switzerland)

=== Final ===
30 September 2007
20:00

| Germany | 2–0 | Brazil |
|---|---|---|
| Prinz 52'; Laudehr 86' | Report |

Hongkou Football Stadium, Shanghai
Attendance: 31,000
Referee: Tammy Ogston (Australia)

== 2011 World Cup ==
For the World Cup in Germany, the Brazilians qualified again as the winner of 2010 South American Women's Football Championship. With four wins in the preliminary round first Colombia, Paraguay, Venezuela and Uruguay were distanced. In the final round, there are three wins against Colombia, Chile and Argentina, who surprisingly lost against Colombia on the final day of the match, giving Colombia instead of Argentina the World Cup ticket.

In Germany, Brazil was in a group with World Cup newcomer Equatorial Guinea, Norway and Australia solved. A 1–0 win over Australia and a 3–0 win over Norway would have been enough to draw against the newcomer from the other side of the Atlantic, but they also won that match 3–0, leaving Brazil without a clean sheet with nine Points group winner was. In the quarter-finals, they met the American women, who had become second only to the group for the first time. Brazil fell behind with a Daiane own goal in the second minute, but were able to equalize in the 68th minute when Marta converted a penalty. The Brazilians were lucky, because although Hope Solo held the first penalty shot by Cristiane, referee Jacqui Melksham had this but repeat because a US player had run too early into the box, and the then approaching Marta was ultimately successful. In addition, the US had to play in underage, as Rachel Buehler had also received the red card for the penalties leading to the penalty. It remained until the end of regular time at 1-1, which gave it an extension. In this Marta scored after just two minutes, the 2–1 lead for Brazil. In the second minute of extra time of extra time Abby Wambach succeeded after a long cross by Megan Rapinoe but still the 2-2 equalizer. Brazil lost 5–3 on penalties

=== Group D ===
| Pos | Team | Pld | W | D | L | GF | GA | GD | Pts | Qualification |
|---|---|---|---|---|---|---|---|---|---|---|
| 1 | Brazil | 3 | 3 | 0 | 0 | 7 | 0 | +7 | 9 | Advance to knockout stage |
| 2 | Australia | 3 | 2 | 0 | 1 | 5 | 4 | +1 | 6 | Advance to knockout stage |
| 3 | Norway | 3 | 1 | 0 | 2 | 2 | 5 | −3 | 3 | |
| 4 | Equatorial Guinea | 3 | 0 | 0 | 3 | 2 | 7 | −5 | 0 | |

Source: FIFA
29 June 2011
18:15

| Brazil | 1–0 | Australia |
|---|---|---|
| Rosana 54' | Report |

Borussia-Park, Mönchengladbach
Attendance: 27,258
Referee: Jenny Palmqvist (Sweden)

3 July 2011
18:15

| Brazil | 3–0 | Norway |
|---|---|---|
| Marta 22', 48'; Rosana 46' | Report |

Volkswagen Arena, Wolfsburg
Attendance: 26,067
Referee: Kari Seitz (United States)

6 July 2011
18:00

| Equatorial Guinea | 0–3 | Brazil |
|---|---|---|
| | Report | Érika 49'; Cristiane 54', 90+3' (pen.) |

Waldstadion, Frankfurt
Attendance: 35,859
Referee: Bibiana Steinhaus (Germany)

=== Quarter-finals ===
10 July 2011
17:30

| Brazil | 2–2 (a.e.t.) | United States |
|---|---|---|
| Marta 68' (pen.), 92' | Report | Daiane 2' (o.g.); Wambach 120+2' |
Penalties
| Cristiane (penalty scored); Marta (penalty scored); Daiane (penalty missed); Francielle (penalty scored) | 3–5 | (penalty scored) Boxx; (penalty scored) Lloyd; (penalty scored) Wambach; (penalty scored) Rapinoe; (penalty scored) Krieger |

Rudolf-Harbig-Stadion, Dresden
Attendance: 25,598
Referee: Jacqui Melksham (Australia)

== 2015 World Cup ==
Four years later, the World Cup took place for the second time in the People's Republic of China. In the 2014 Copa América Femenina, which once again served as Qualification, the 10 CONMEBOL members initially played four teams in two groups of five for the finals. Brazil first met Paraguay, Venezuela, Peru and Bolivia. With four victories, Brazil reached the final round, but was there only second behind Argentina in front of Uruguay and Paraguay. With that Argentina and Brazil drove again to the World Cup.

In the draw of the groups the Brazilians were set and were "assigned" to the group E. As group opponents were allocated South Korea as well as the World Cup newcomers Spain and Costa Rica.

In the group, the Brazilians prevailed without loss of point, beat South Korea 2–0, Spain 1-0 and Costa Rica also 1–0. In the second round they were then defeated Australia 0-1 and elimated.

=== Group E ===
| Pos | Team | Pld | W | D | L | GF | GA | GD | Pts | Qualification |
|---|---|---|---|---|---|---|---|---|---|---|
| 1 | Brazil | 3 | 3 | 0 | 0 | 4 | 0 | +4 | 9 | Advance to knockout stage |
| 2 | South Korea | 3 | 1 | 1 | 1 | 4 | 5 | −1 | 4 | Advance to knockout stage |
| 3 | Costa Rica | 3 | 0 | 2 | 1 | 3 | 4 | −1 | 2 | |
| 4 | Spain | 3 | 0 | 1 | 2 | 2 | 4 | −2 | 1 | |

Source: FIFA
9 June 2015
19:00 EDT (UTC−4)

| Brazil | 2–0 | South Korea |
|---|---|---|
| Formiga 33'; Marta 53' (pen.) | Report |

Olympic Stadium, Montreal
Attendance: 10,175
Referee: Esther Staubli (Switzerland)

13 June 2015
16:00 EDT (UTC−4)

| Brazil | 1–0 | Spain |
|---|---|---|
| Andressa Alves 44' | Report |

Olympic Stadium, Montreal
Attendance: 28,623
Referee: Carol Anne Chenard (Canada)

17 June 2015
20:00 ADT (UTC−3)

| Costa Rica | 0–1 | Brazil |
|---|---|---|
| | Report | Raquel 83' |

Moncton Stadium, Moncton
Attendance: 9,543
Referee: Efthalia Mitsi (Greece)

=== Round of 16 ===
21 June 2015
14:00 ADT (UTC−3)

| Brazil | 0–1 | Australia |
|---|---|---|
| | Report | Simon 80' |

Moncton Stadium, Moncton
Attendance: 12,054
Referee: Teodora Albon (Romania)

== 2019 World Cup ==
In the Qualification, the Brazilians prevailed in the Sudamericano Femenino 2018. After two games of the final round of the top four teams, the World Cup participation was no longer to take. Victory in the last game against Colombia also defended the title.

Group opponents in France were Australia, Italy and Jamaica. After the Brazilians have not won a game since July 2018, they could win against Jamaica without World Cup top goalscorer Marta 3–0. All goals scored Cristiana, who had not played since winning the South American Championship international match. In the second game against Australia, they went 2–0 in the lead, with Marta scored the first goal and her 16th goal of the World Cup with a transformed penalty, equaling with Miroslav Klose, the men's world record scorer. In extra time in the first half, the Australians were able to score the goal and in the second half, to which Marta was substituted, turn the game and win 3–2. The third goal came from an own goal by Mônica. In the third match against Italy, the Brazilians won by a Marta-converted penalty. With Australia beating Jamaica 4–1 on aggregate, losing 2–1 to Italy in the first game and defeating Jamaica 5–0, the three sides tied. Italy's group winners and Australia finished second with a goal more scored with the same goal difference as Brazil. The Brazilians also qualified as the best group third for the round of 16 where they met hosts France. With 1: 2 after extra time they lost against the French, against whom they could not win before in eight matches.

=== Group C ===
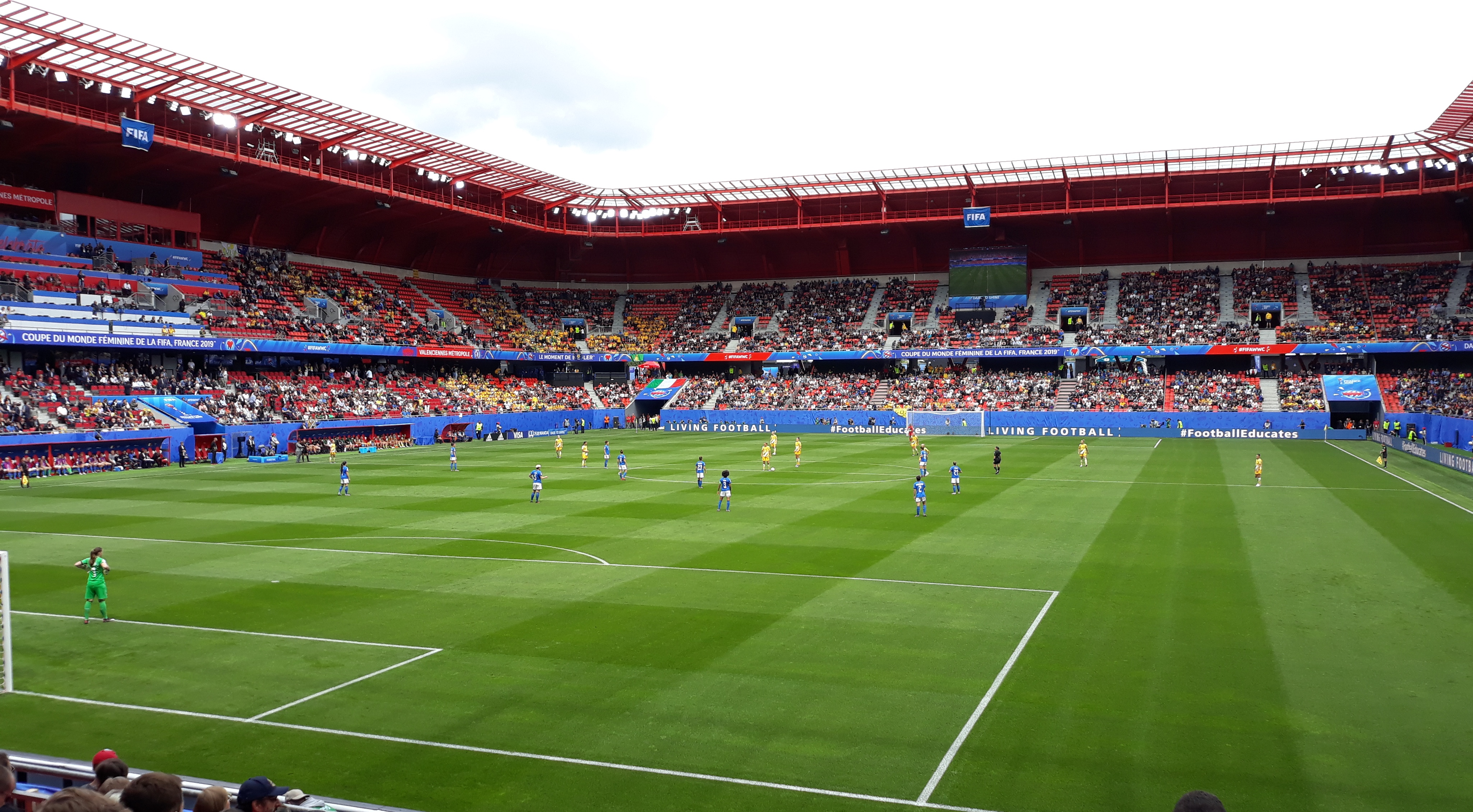
Australia vs Italy in Valenciennes

| Pos | Team | Pld | W | D | L | GF | GA | GD | Pts | Qualification |
|---|---|---|---|---|---|---|---|---|---|---|
| 1 | Italy | 3 | 2 | 0 | 1 | 7 | 2 | +5 | 6 | Advance to knockout stage |
| 2 | Australia | 3 | 2 | 0 | 1 | 8 | 5 | +3 | 6 | Advance to knockout stage |
| 3 | Brazil | 3 | 2 | 0 | 1 | 6 | 3 | +3 | 6 | Advance to knockout stage |
| 4 | Jamaica | 3 | 0 | 0 | 3 | 1 | 12 | −11 | 0 | |

Source: FIFA
9 June 2019
15:30

| Brazil | 3–0 | Jamaica |
|---|---|---|
| Cristiane 15', 50', 64' | Report |

Stade des Alpes, Grenoble
Attendance: 17,668
Referee: Riem Hussein (Germany)

13 June 2019
18:00

| Australia | 3–2 | Brazil |
|---|---|---|
| Foord 45+1'; Logarzo 58'; Mônica 66' (o.g.) | Report | Marta 27' (pen.); Cristiane 38' |

Stade de la Mosson, Montpellier
Attendance: 17,032
Referee: Esther Staubli (Switzerland)

18 June 2019
21:00

| Italy | 0–1 | Brazil |
|---|---|---|
| | Report | Marta 74' (pen.) |

Stade du Hainaut, Valenciennes
Attendance: 21,669
Referee: Lucila Venegas (Mexico)

=== Round of 16 ===
23 June 2019
21:00

| France | 2–1 (a.e.t.) | Brazil |
|---|---|---|
| Gauvin 52'; Henry 107' | Report | Thaisa 63' |

Stade Océane, Le Havre
Attendance: 23,965
Referee: Marie-Soleil Beaudoin (Canada)

== 2023 World Cup ==
=== Group F ===
| Pos | Team | Pld | W | D | L | GF | GA | GD | Pts | Qualification |
|---|---|---|---|---|---|---|---|---|---|---|
| 1 | France | 3 | 2 | 1 | 0 | 8 | 4 | +4 | 7 | Advance to knockout stage |
| 2 | Jamaica | 3 | 1 | 2 | 0 | 1 | 0 | +1 | 5 | Advance to knockout stage |
| 3 | Brazil | 3 | 1 | 1 | 1 | 5 | 2 | +3 | 4 | |
| 4 | Panama | 3 | 0 | 0 | 3 | 3 | 11 | −8 | 0 | |

Source: FIFA
Rules for classification: Group stage tiebreakers
24 July 2023
20:30 UTC+9:30

| Brazil | 4–0 | Panama |
|---|---|---|
| Ary Borges 19', 39', 70'; Bia Zaneratto 48' | Report |

Hindmarsh Stadium, Adelaide
Attendance: 13,142
Referee: Cheryl Foster (Wales)

29 July 2023
20:00 UTC+10

| France | 2–1 | Brazil |
|---|---|---|
| Le Sommer 17'; Renard 83' | Report | Debinha 58' |

Lang Park, Brisbane
Attendance: 49,378
Referee: Kate Jacewicz (Australia)

2 August 2023
20:00 UTC+10

| Jamaica | 0–0 | Brazil |
|---|---|---|
| | Report |

Melbourne Rectangular Stadium, Melbourne
Attendance: 27,638
Referee: Esther Staubli (Switzerland)

== 2027 World Cup ==
Brazil will host the 2027 edition marking the first time that South America has hosted the tournament. Brazil qualified automatically as host.

== Head-to-head record ==
| Opponent | Pld | W | D | L | GF | GA | GD | Win % |
|---|---|---|---|---|---|---|---|---|
| Australia | 4 | 2 | 0 | 2 | 6 | 6 | +0 | 50.00 |
| China | 1 | 1 | 0 | 0 | 4 | 0 | +4 | 100.00 |
| Costa Rica | 1 | 1 | 0 | 0 | 1 | 0 | +1 | 100.00 |
| Denmark | 1 | 1 | 0 | 0 | 1 | 0 | +1 | 100.00 |
| Equatorial Guinea | 1 | 1 | 0 | 0 | 3 | 0 | +3 | 100.00 |
| France | 3 | 0 | 1 | 2 | 3 | 5 | −2 | 0.00 |
| Germany | 3 | 0 | 1 | 2 | 4 | 11 | −7 | 0.00 |
| Italy | 2 | 2 | 0 | 0 | 3 | 0 | +3 | 100.00 |
| Jamaica | 2 | 1 | 1 | 0 | 3 | 0 | +3 | 50.00 |
| Japan | 2 | 1 | 0 | 1 | 2 | 2 | +0 | 50.00 |
| Mexico | 1 | 1 | 0 | 0 | 7 | 1 | +6 | 100.00 |
| Nigeria | 1 | 1 | 0 | 0 | 4 | 3 | +1 | 100.00 |
| New Zealand | 1 | 1 | 0 | 0 | 5 | 0 | +5 | 100.00 |
| Norway | 3 | 2 | 1 | 0 | 7 | 1 | +6 | 66.67 |
| Panama | 1 | 1 | 0 | 0 | 4 | 0 | +4 | 100.00 |
| South Korea | 2 | 2 | 0 | 0 | 5 | 0 | +5 | 100.00 |
| Spain | 1 | 1 | 0 | 0 | 1 | 0 | +1 | 100.00 |
| Sweden | 3 | 1 | 0 | 2 | 2 | 4 | −2 | 33.33 |
| United States | 4 | 1 | 1 | 2 | 6 | 9 | −3 | 25.00 |
| Total | 37 | 21 | 5 | 11 | 71 | 42 | +29 | 56.76 |

== Goalscorers ==
| Player | Goals | 1991 | 1995 | 1999 | 2003 | 2007 | 2011 | 2015 | 2019 | 2023 | 2027 |
|---|---|---|---|---|---|---|---|---|---|---|---|
| Marta | 17 | | | | 3 | 7 | 4 | 1 | 2 | | |
| Cristiane | 11 | | | | | 5 | 2 | | 4 | | |
| Sissi | 7 | | | 7 | | | | | | | |
| Kátia | 6 | | | 2 | 4 | | | | | | |
| Pretinha | 5 | | 1 | 3 | | 1 | | | | | |
| Rosana | 3 | | | | 1 | | 2 | | | | |
| Ary Borges | 3 | | | | | | | | | 3 | |
| Cidinha | 2 | | | 2 | | | | | | | |
| Daniela | 2 | | | | 1 | 1 | | | | | |
| Formiga | 2 | | | | | 1 | | 1 | | | |
| Roseli | 2 | | 2 | | | | | | | | |
| Andressa Alves | 1 | | | | | | | 1 | | | |
| Elane | 1 | 1 | | | | | | | | | |
| Érika | 1 | | | | | | 1 | | | | |
| Thaisa | 1 | | | | | | | | 1 | | |
| Maycon | 1 | | | 1 | | | | | | | |
| Nenê | 1 | | | 1 | | | | | | | |
| Raquel | 1 | | | | | | | 1 | | | |
| Renata | 1 | | | | | 1 | | | | | |
| Bia Zaneratto | 1 | | | | | | | | | 1 | |
| Debinha | 1 | | | | | | | | | 1 | |
| Own goals | 1 | | | | | 1 | | | | | |
| Total | 71 | 1 | 3 | 16 | 9 | 17 | 9 | 4 | 7 | 5 | |

Own goals scored for opponents

- Daiane (scored for United States in 2011)
- Mônica (scored for Australia in 2019)
