= 1999 in Brazilian football =

Football in Brazil
- Season: 1999

The following article presents a summary of the 1999 football (soccer) season in Brazil, which was the 98th season of competitive football in the country.

== Campeonato Brasileiro Série A ==
Quarterfinals

Team #1	Agg	Team #2	1st leg	2nd leg	3rd leg
Guarani	1-3	Corinthians	0-0	0-2	1-1
Atlético Mineiro	7-4	Cruzeiro	4-2	3-2	-
Vitória	8-7	Vasco da Gama	5-4	2-2	1-1
São Paulo	7-6	Ponte Preta	3-2	1-2	3-2

Semifinals

Team #1	Agg	Team #2	1st leg	2nd leg	3rd leg
São Paulo	3-5	Corinthians	2-3	1-2	-
Atlético Mineiro	6-2	Vitória	3-0	1-2	3-0

Final

December 12, 1999

Atlético Mineiro	3–2	Corinthians

Mineirão

December 19, 1999

Corinthians	2–0	Atlético Mineiro

Morumbi

December 22, 1999

Corinthians	0–0	Atlético Mineiro

Morumbi

Corinthians declared as the Campeonato Brasileiro champions by aggregate score of 4-3.

=== Relegation ===
The four clubs with the lowest average points in the 1998 and 1999 seasons, which are Botafogo-SP, Juventude, Paraná and Gama, were relegated to the following year's second level.

== Campeonato Brasileiro Série B ==
Pos	Team	Pld	W	D	L	GF	GA	GD	Pts	Promotion	GOI	SCR	BAH	VIL
1	Goiás	6	3	2	1	5	3	+2	11	Promoted to Série A 2000		0–0	0–0	1–0
2	Santa Cruz	6	3	1	2	6	5	+1	10	Promoted to Série A 2000	2–1		2–1	2–1
3	Bahia	6	2	1	3	9	9	0	7		1–2	1–0		4–2
4	Vila Nova	6	2	0	4	7	10	−3	6		0–1	1–0	3–2	

Goiás declared as the Campeonato Brasileiro Série B champions.

=== Promotion ===
The two best placed teams in the final stage of the competition, which are Goiás and Santa Cruz, were promoted to the following year's first level.

=== Relegation ===
The six worst placed teams, which are União São João, Criciúma, Paysandu, Tuna Luso, América-RN and Desportiva, were relegated to the following year's third level.

== Campeonato Brasileiro Série C ==
Pos	Team	Pld	W	D	L	GF	GA	GD	Pts	FLU	SRA	SER	NAU
1	Fluminense (P)	6	4	1	1	10	6	+4	13		2–0	1–2	2–1
2	São Raimundo (P)	6	3	0	3	9	9	0	9	0–1		2–0	2–1
3	Serra	6	2	1	3	9	13	−4	7	2–2	4–3		0–1
4	Náutico	6	2	0	4	9	9	0	6	1–2	1–2	4–1	

Source: rsssf.com
(P) Promoted to 2000 Série B

Fluminense declared as the Campeonato Brasileiro Série C champions.

=== Promotion ===
The two best placed teams in the final stage of the competition, which are Fluminense and São Raimundo, were promoted to the following year's second level.

== Copa do Brasil ==
The Copa do Brasil final was played between Juventude and Botafogo.

June 20, 1999

Juventude	2–1	Botafogo

Alfredo Jaconi

June 27, 1999

Botafogo	0–0	Juventude

Maracanã

Juventude declared as the cup champions by aggregate score of 2-1.

== Regional and state championship champions ==
Regional championship champions

Competition	Champion
Campeonato do Nordeste	Vitória
Copa Centro-Oeste	Cruzeiro
Copa Norte	São Raimundo
Copa Sul	Grêmio
Torneio Rio-São Paulo	Vasco

State championship champions

State	Champion	State	Champion
Acre	Vasco-AC	Paraíba	Botafogo-PB
Alagoas	CSA	Paraná	Coritiba
Amapá	Ypiranga	Pernambuco	Sport Recife
Amazonas	São Raimundo	Piauí	River
Bahia	Bahia; Vitória^{(1)}	Rio de Janeiro	Flamengo
Ceará	Ceará	Rio Grande do Norte	ABC
Distrito Federal	Gama	Rio Grande do Sul	Grêmio
Espírito Santo	Serra	Rondônia	Ji-Paraná
Goiás	Goiás	Roraima	Baré
Maranhão	Maranhão	Santa Catarina	Figueirense
Mato Grosso	Sinop	São Paulo	Corinthians
Mato Grosso do Sul	Ubiratan	Sergipe	Sergipe
Minas Gerais	Atlético Mineiro	Tocantins	Interporto
Pará	Remo		

^{(1)}The second leg of the final was not played, and in January 2005, the Bahia Football Federation declared both clubs, Bahia and Vitória, as champions of the competition.

== Youth competition champions ==
Competition	Champion
Copa Macaé de Juvenis	Flamengo
Copa Santiago de Futebol Juvenil	Fluminense
Copa São Paulo de Juniores	Corinthians
Taça Belo Horizonte de Juniores	Botafogo

== Other competition champions ==
Competition	Champion
Copa Estado de São Paulo	Etti Jundiaí
Copa Paraná	Grêmio Maringá
Copa Pernambuco	Porto
Copa Rio	Volta Redonda
Copa Santa Catarina	Marcílio Dias
Taça Minas Gerais	URT

== Brazilian clubs in international competitions ==
Team	Copa Libertadores 1999	Copa Mercosur 1999	Copa CONMEBOL 1999	Intercontinental Cup 1999
Corinthians	Quarterfinals	Quarterfinals	Did not qualify	N/A
Cruzeiro	Did not qualify	Quarterfinals	Did not qualify	N/A
CSA	Did not qualify	Did not qualify	Runner-up	N/A
Flamengo	Did not qualify	Champions	Did not qualify	N/A
Grêmio	Did not qualify	Group stage	Did not qualify	N/A
Palmeiras	Champions	Runner-up	Did not qualify	Runner-up
Paraná	Did not qualify	Did not qualify	Quarterfinals	N/A
São Paulo	Did not qualify	Group stage	Did not qualify	N/A
São Raimundo (AM)	Did not qualify	Did not qualify	Semifinals	N/A
Vasco	Round of 16	Group stage	Did not qualify	N/A
Vila Nova	Did not qualify	Did not qualify	Round of 16	N/A

== Brazil national team ==
The following table lists all the games played by the Brazil national football team in official competitions and friendly matches during 1999.

Date	Opposition	Result	Score	Brazil scorers	Competition
March 28, 1999	South Korea	L	0-1	-	International Friendly
March 31, 1999	Japan	W	2-0	Amoroso, Emerson	International Friendly
April 28, 1999	(Spain) FC Barcelona	D	2-2	Ronaldo, Rivaldo	International Friendly (unofficial match)
June 5, 1999	Netherlands	D	2-2	Amoroso, Giovanni	International Friendly
June 8, 1999	Netherlands	W	3-1	Frank de Boer (own goal), Amoroso, Leonardo	International Friendly
June 26, 1999	Latvia	W	3-0	Alex, Roberto Carlos, Ronaldinho	International Friendly
June 30, 1999	Venezuela	W	7-0	Ronaldo (2), Emerson, Amoroso (2), Ronaldinho, Rivaldo	Copa América
July 3, 1999	Mexico	W	2-1	Amoroso, Alex	Copa América
July 6, 1999	Chile	W	1-0	Ronaldo	Copa América
July 11, 1999	Argentina	W	2-1	Rivaldo, Ronaldo	Copa América
July 14, 1999	Mexico	W	2-0	Amoroso, Rivaldo	Copa América
July 18, 1999	Uruguay	W	3-0	Rivaldo (2), Ronaldo	Copa América
July 24, 1999	Germany	W	4-0	Zé Roberto, Ronaldinho, Alex (2)	Confederations Cup
July 28, 1999	United States	W	1-0	Ronaldinho	Confederations Cup
July 30, 1999	New Zealand	W	2-0	Marcos Paulo, Ronaldinho	Confederations Cup
August 1, 1999	Saudi Arabia	W	8-2	João Carlos, Ronaldinho (3), Zé Roberto, Alex (2), Roni	Confederations Cup
August 4, 1999	Mexico	L	3-4	Serginho, Roni, Zé Roberto	Confederations Cup
September 4, 1999	Argentina	L	0-2	-	International Friendly
September 7, 1999	Argentina	W	4-2	Rivaldo (3), Ronaldo	International Friendly
October 9, 1999	Netherlands	D	2-2	Roberto Carlos, Cafu	International Friendly
November 13, 1999	Spain	D	0-0	-	International Friendly

== Women's football ==
=== Brazil women's national football team ===
The following table lists all the games played by the Brazil women's national football team in official competitions and friendly matches during 1999.

Date	Opposition	Result	Score	Brazil scorers	Competition
May 22, 1999	United States	L	0–3	-	International Friendly
June 3, 1999	Canada	W	4–2	Sissi (2), Pretinha (2)	International Friendly
June 6, 1999	Australia	W	3–1	Pretinha (2), Nenê	International Friendly
June 19, 1999	Mexico	W	7–1	Pretinha (3), Sissi (3), Kátia Cilene	World Cup
June 24, 1999	Italy	W	2–0	Sissi (2)	World Cup
June 27, 1999	Germany	D	3–3	Kátia Cilene, Sissi, Maycon	World Cup
July 1, 1999	Nigeria	W	3–3 (aet: 1–0)	Cidinha (2), Nenê, Sissi	World Cup
July 4, 1999	United States	L	0–2	-	World Cup
July 10, 1999	Norway	D	0–0 (5–4 pen)	-	World Cup
September 26, 1999	United States	L	0–6	-	International Friendly
October 3, 1999	Finland	W	3–1	Maycon, Roseli (2)	U.S. Cup
October 7, 1999	South Korea	W	4–0	Roseli (2), Raquel (2)	U.S. Cup
October 10, 1999	United States	L	2–4	Nildinha (2)	U.S. Cup

The Brazil women's national football team competed in the following competitions in 1999:

Competition	Performance
U.S. Cup	Runner-up
World Cup	Semifinals

=== Domestic competition champions ===
Competition	Champion
Campeonato Brasileiro	Portuguesa
Campeonato Carioca	Vasco (FFERJ); Campo Grande (LIDERJ)
Campeonato Paulista	São Paulo
