= Suzana (footballer) =

Brazilian footballer

Personal information
- Full name: Suzana Ferreira da Silva
- Date of birth: 12 October 1973 (age 53)
- Place of birth: Brazil
- Position: Midfielder

International career
Years	Team	Apps	(Gls)
2000	Brazil		

Suzana Ferreira da Silva (born 12 October 1973) is a Brazilian former football midfielder who played for the Brazil women's national football team at the 1999 FIFA Women's World Cup in the United States and 2000 Summer Olympics in Sydney, Australia. At the time of the 1999 World Cup she was playing for São Paulo FC.

== See also ==
- Brazil at the 2000 Summer Olympics
