= Ingeborg Hovland =

Norwegian footballer (born 1969)

Personal information
- Full name: Ingeborg Hovland
- Date of birth: 3 October 1969 (age 57)
- Height: 1.73 m (5 ft 8 in)
- Position: Goalkeeper

Youth career
- Vard
- Skjold

Senior career*
Years	Team	Apps	(Gls)
1988–2005	Klepp	512	(2)

International career^{‡}
1996–2001	Norway	11	(0)
Medal record
Women's football
Representing Norway
Olympic Games
Gold medal – first place	2000 Sydney	Team competition
- * Club domestic league appearances and goals ‡ National team caps and goals as of 27 September 2014

Ingeborg Hovland (born 3 October 1969) is a former Norwegian footballer who played as a goalkeeper for Klepp IL of the Toppserien. With the Norway women's national team, Hovland was an alternate for the 1999 FIFA Women's World Cup and won an Olympic gold medal in 2000. She was named in Norway's squad for the 1997 and 2001 editions of the UEFA Women's Championship, as an understudy to Bente Nordby.

Hovland scored twice in 512 games for Klepp. As of 2012 she was leading the club's all-time appearance list. During her football career she was employed as a civil engineer.
