= 2000 Women's U.S. Cup =

Tournament details
- Host country: United States
- City: Portland, Oregon
- Dates: May 5–7, 2000
- Teams: 4 (from 2 confederations)

The sixth Women's U.S. Cup tournament held in 2000, were joined by four teams: Canada, South Korea, Mexico and USA. The tournament was in a knockout format, with all matches played in the Civic Stadium in Portland, Oregon.

== Matches ==
May 5 Semi-final	Canada	1–0	South Korea	Portland, Oregon
6:00pm PT	Neil 71'			Stadium: Civic Stadium; Attendance: 6517

May 5 Semi-final	United States	8–0	Mexico	Portland, Oregon
8:30pm PT	MacMillan 3' (pen.), 61'; Lilly 22'; Serlenga 25'; Milbrett 45'; Hamm 47'; Fair 64'; Welsh 76'			Stadium: Civic Stadium; Attendance: 6517

May 7 Final match	United States	4–0	Canada	Portland, Oregon
11:30am PT	Foudy 46'; Parlow 75'; Milbrett 80'; Welsh 85'			Stadium: Civic Stadium; Attendance: 7659

May 7 Third place playoff	Mexico	4–1	South Korea	Portland, Oregon
2:00pm PT	Rosales 19'; Dominguez 21', 44'; Mora 90+'		Song 22'	Stadium: Civic Stadium; Attendance: 7659

== Final placing ==
Rank	Team
Champion	United States
Runner-up	Canada
Third place	Mexico
Fourth place	South Korea

== Goal scorers ==
Position	Player	Goals
1	(Mexico) Maribel Dominguez	2
1	(United States) Shannon MacMillan	2
1	(United States) Tiffeny Milbrett	2
1	(United States) Christie Welsh	2
2	(United States) Lorrie Fair	1
2	(United States) Julie Foudy	1
2	(United States) Mia Hamm	1
2	(United States) Kristine Lilly	1
2	(Mexico) Iris Mora	1
2	(Canada) Andrea Neil	1
2	(United States) Cindy Parlow	1
2	(Mexico) Mayra Rosales	1
2	(United States) Nikki Serlenga	1
2	(South Korea) Ju-Hee Song	1
