= 1998 Women's U.S. Cup =

Tournament details
- Host country: United States
- Dates: September 12–20, 1998
- Teams: 4 (from 3 confederations)

The fourth Women's U.S. Cup tournament held in 1998, were joined by four teams: Brazil, Russia, Mexico and USA.

Mia Hamm of USA scored her one hundredth career international goal at the 1998 U.S. Cup, against Russia.

== Matches ==
September 12 Round-robin	United States	9–0	Mexico	Foxborough, Massachusetts
	Hamm 18', 40'; Lilly 19', 42'; Milbrett 32'; MacMillan 52'; Fawcett 60'; Venturini 65'; Keller 76'			Attendance: 35,461; Referee: Nancy Lay (United States)

September 15 Round-robin	Brazil	2–2	Russia	Oneonta, New York
	Pretinha		Barbashina; Letyushova	Attendance: 1,872; Referee: Al Mazzone (United States)

September 18 Round-robin	United States	4–0	Russia	Rochester, New York
	Milbrett 25', 28'; Hamm 35', 44'			Attendance: 12,052; Referee: Kari Seitz (United States)

September 18 Round-robin	Brazil	11–0	Mexico	Rochester, New York
	Roseli (6 goals); Pretinha (4 goals); Nene			Attendance: 12,052; Referee: Gerry Corrie (United States)

September 20 Round-robin	United States	3–0	Brazil	Richmond, Virginia
	Akers; Fawcett; Keller			Attendance: 9,147; Referee: Sandra Hunt (United States)

September 20 Round-robin	Russia	5–1	Mexico	Richmond, Virginia
	Bosikova; Grigorieva; Letyushova		Dominguez	Attendance: 9,147; Referee: Thomas Perry (United States)

== Final placing ==
Rank	Team	Matches				Goals		Points
Rank	Team	Played	Win	Draw	Loss	Scored	Against	Points
1	United States	3	3	0	0	16	0	9
2	Brazil	3	1	1	1	13	5	4
3	Russia	3	1	1	1	7	7	4
4	Mexico	3	0	0	3	1	25	0

== Goal scorers ==
Position	Player	Goals
1	(Brazil) Roseli de Belo	6
1	(Brazil) Pretinha	6
2	(United States) Mia Hamm	4
3	(Russia) Nadesha Bossikova	3
3	(United States) Tiffeny Milbrett	3
4	(United States) Joy Fawcett	2
4	(United States) Debbie Keller	2
4	(Russia) Olga Letyushova	2
4	(United States) Kristine Lilly	2
5	(United States) Michelle Akers	1
5	(Russia) Natalia Barbashina	1
5	(Mexico) Maribel Dominguez	1
5	(Russia) Irina Grigorieva	1
5	(United States) Shannon MacMillan	1
5	(Brazil) Nene	1
5	(United States) Tisha Venturini	1
