= 1996 Women's U.S. Cup =

Tournament details
- Host country: United States
- Dates: May 11–18, 1996
- Teams: 4 (from 2 confederations)

The second Women's U.S. Cup tournament held in 1996, were joined by four teams: Canada, China, Japan and USA.

== Matches ==
May 11 Round-robin	China	3–0	Japan	Salem, New Hampshire
	unknown

May 12 Round-robin	United States	6–0	Canada	Worcester, Massachusetts
	Foudy 5'; Milbrett 18'; MacMillan 55'; Gabarra 63'; Parlow 77'; Roberts 78'

May 15 Round-robin	China	5–0	Canada	New Britain, Connecticut
	unknown			Stadium: Veterans Stadium

May 16 Round-robin	United States	4–0	Japan	Horsham, Pennsylvania
	Venturini 43'; Lilly 50', 53'; Gabarra 89'

May 18 Round-robin	Japan	0–0 (4–3 p)	Canada	Washington, D.C.

May 18 Round-robin	United States	1–0	China	Washington, D.C.
	Akers 63'

== Final placing ==
Rank	Team	Matches				Goals		Points
Rank	Team	Played	Win	Draw	Loss	Scored	Against	Points
1	United States	3	3	0	0	11	0	9
2	China	3	2	0	1	8	1	6
3	Japan	3	1	0	2	0	7	3
4	Canada	3	0	0	3	0	11	0
