= Raquel (footballer) =

Brazilian footballer

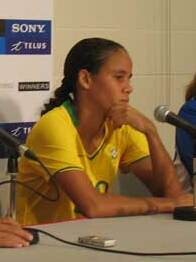
- Raquel in 2008

Personal information
- Full name: Raquel de Souza Noronha
- Date of birth: 10 May 1978 (age 48)
- Place of birth: Porto Alegre, Brazil
- Height: 1.60 m (5 ft 3 in)
- Position: Midfielder

Senior career*
Years	Team	Apps	(Gls)
- São Paulo FC
2005	Bay State Select	13	(5)

International career
1998–2000	Brazil		
- * Club domestic league appearances and goals

Raquel de Souza Noronha (born 10 May 1978), commonly known as Raquel, is a Brazilian football midfielder.

After making her national team debut against Russia at the 1998 Women's U.S. Cup, she played for the Brazil women's national football team at the 1999 FIFA Women's World Cup and 2000 Summer Olympics.

In 2005 she played for Women's Premier Soccer League (WPSL) club Bay State Select, alongside compatriot Daniela Alves Lima. She scored five goals and served three assists in 13 appearances.

== See also ==
- Brazil at the 2000 Summer Olympics
