= Shannon MacMillan =

American soccer player (born 1974)

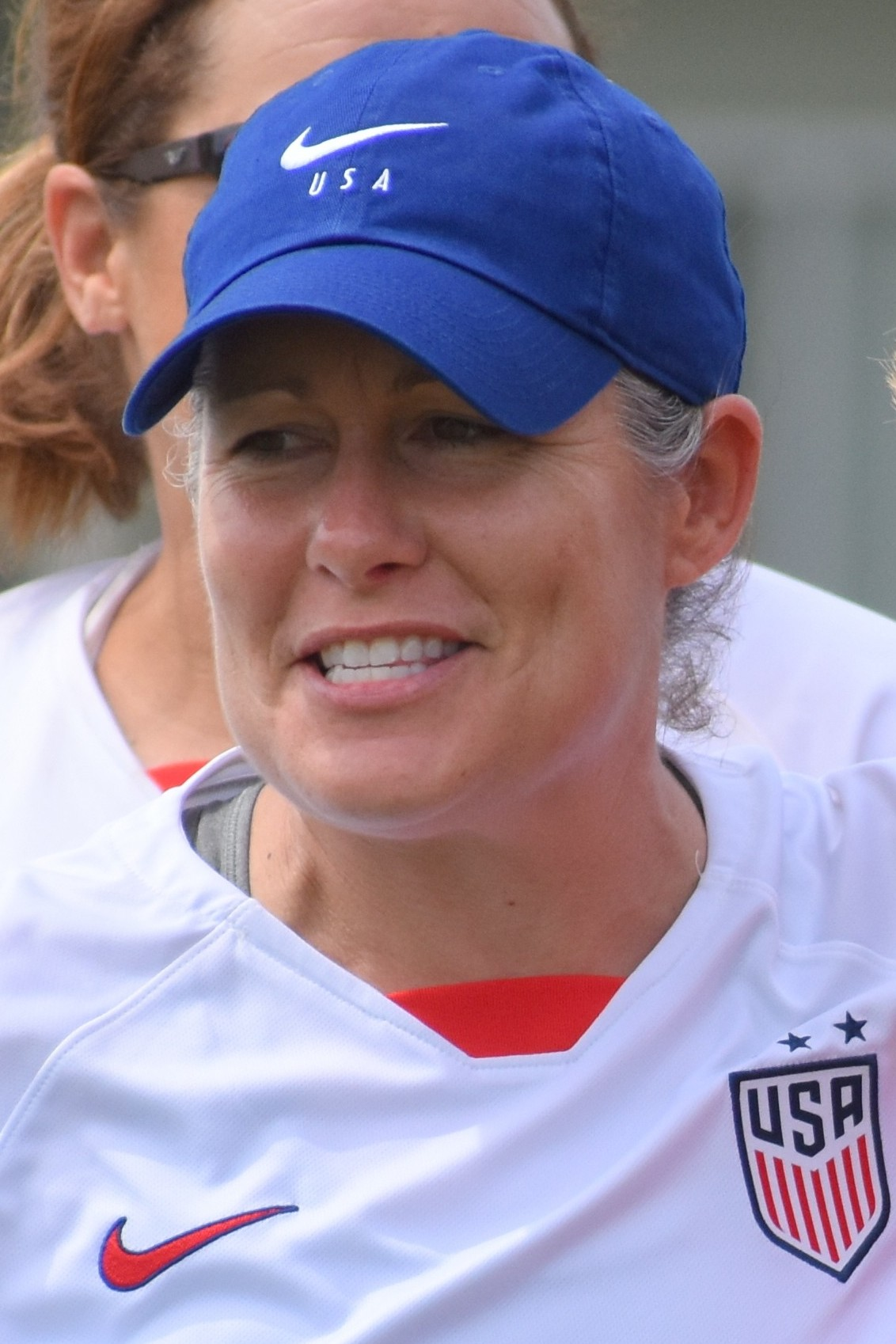

Personal information
- Full name: Shannon Ann MacMillan
- Date of birth: October 7, 1974 (age 52)
- Place of birth: Syosset, New York, U.S.
- Height: 5 ft 5 in (1.65 m)
- Positions: Midfielder; forward

College career
Years	Team	Apps	(Gls)
1992–1995	Portland Pilots		

Senior career*
Years	Team	Apps	(Gls)
2001–2003	San Diego Spirit		

International career
1993–2005	United States	177	(60)

Managerial career
- 2007–2008: UCLA Bruins (assistant)
Medal record
Women's football (soccer)
Representing the United States
Olympic Games
Gold medal – first place	1996 Atlanta	Team competition
Silver medal – second place	2000 Sydney	Team competition
FIFA Women's World Cup
Gold medal – first place	1999 USA	Team competition
Bronze medal – third place	2003 USA	Team competition
- * Club domestic league appearances and goals

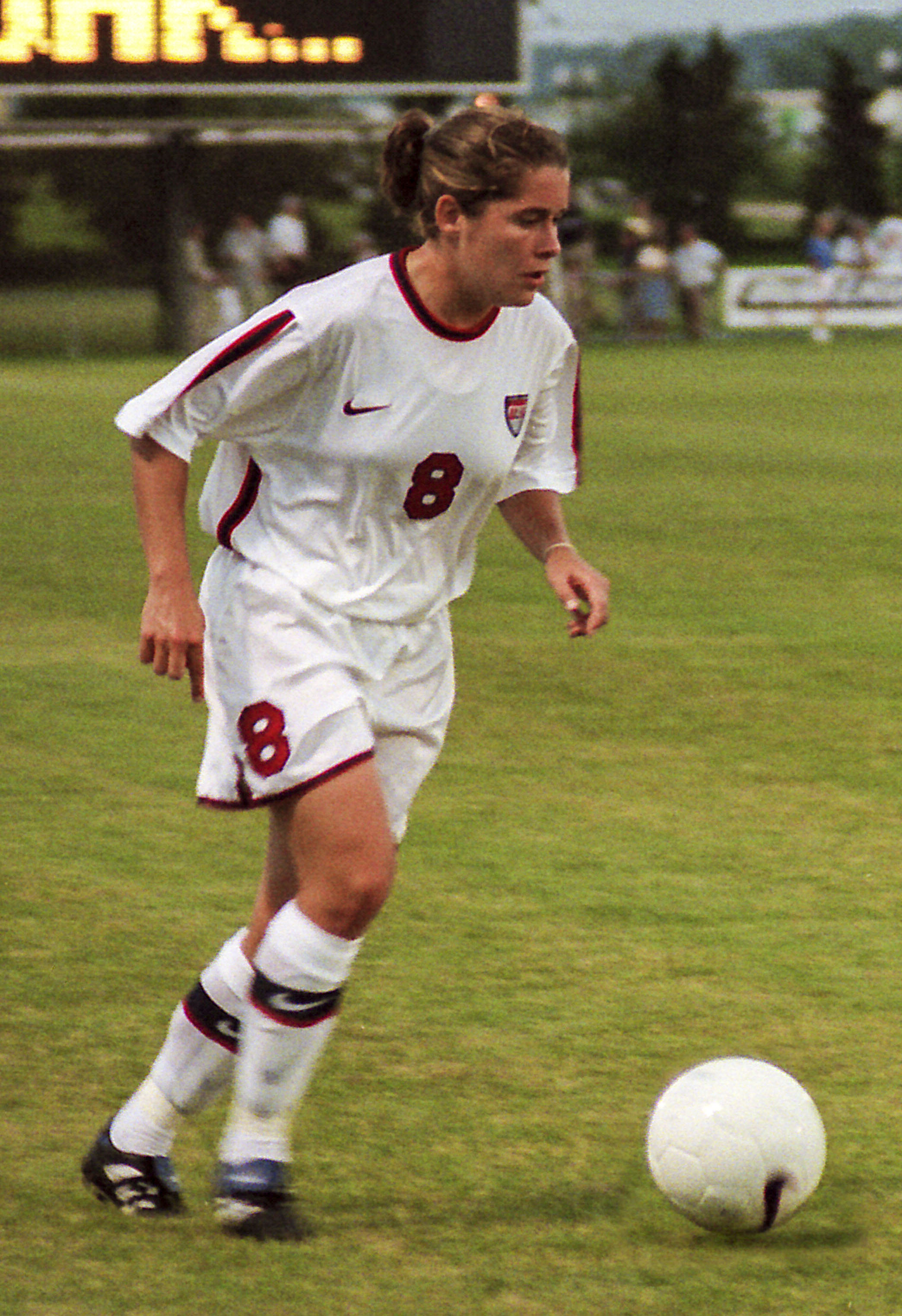

Shannon Ann MacMillan (born October 7, 1974) is an American retired soccer player, coach, FIFA Women's World Cup champion, Olympic gold and silver medalist. Named U.S. Soccer Athlete of the Year for 2002, MacMillan played for the United States women's national soccer team from 1994 to 2006 and was part of the 1999 FIFA Women's World Cup-winning team (commonly known as the '99ers). She won gold with the team at the 1996 Summer Olympics and silver at the 2000 Summer Olympics.

In 2007, MacMillan became an assistant coach for the UCLA Bruins women's soccer team. In 2016, she was inducted in the National Soccer Hall of Fame. She is also a part of the ownership group for Angel City FC of the National Women's Soccer League.

== Early life ==
MacMillan was born in Syosset, New York. She attended San Pasqual High School in Escondido, California. She has one older brother, Sean.

=== University of Portland ===
MacMillan played for the University of Portland, where she won the Hermann Trophy for the best female collegiate soccer player of the 1995 season. She earned All-America honors from 1992 to 1995.

== Playing career ==
=== Club ===
MacMillan was one of the founding players of the Women's United Soccer Association, playing three seasons for the San Diego Spirit.

=== International ===
While still in college, MacMillan joined the US National Team in 1993 as a midfielder. By 2000, she moved to forward.

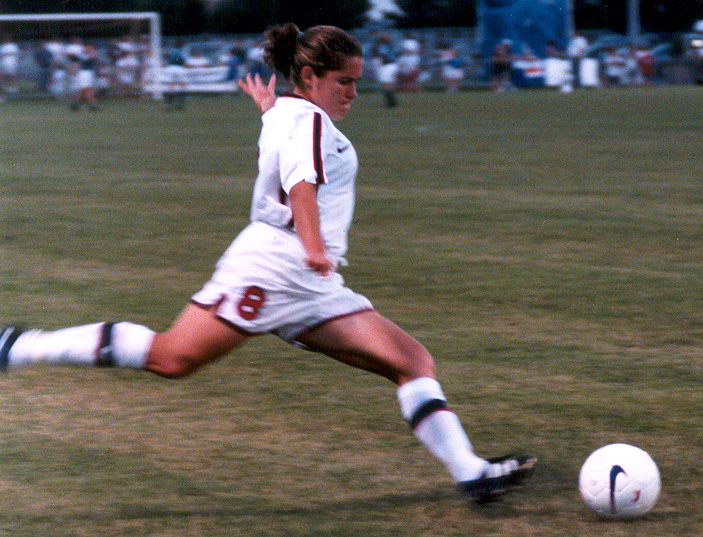
Shannon during a halftime workout

In the Olympic semifinal against Norway in 1996, she scored the game-winning goal in overtime. In the Olympic final against China, she collected a Mia Hamm shot that rebounded off the post and put it in for the first goal of the match.

She was a "super-sub" on the US WNT's 1999 Women's World Cup team and the 2000 Olympic team. She earned a spot on the roster for the 2003 Women's World Cup team after making a miraculously quick recovery from an ACL tear suffered just four months before the tournament began.

In 2002, MacMillan scored 17 goals and was voted the U.S. Soccer Female Athlete of the Year.

She retired from international play in 2006 at the age of 31. She finished her international career with 60 goals and with 175 caps, the tenth most of any woman in history up to that time. She was the sixth-leading goal scorer in 2005.

== Honors and awards ==
MacMillan was awarded the MAC Hermann Trophy Award in 1995. She was voted U.S. Soccer Female Athlete of the Year in 2002. She was inducted into the Oregon Sports Hall of Fame on September 25, 2007. As a senior at Portland, she won the Honda Sports Award as the nation's top soccer player.

== Coaching career ==
In 2007, MacMillan became an assistant coach for the UCLA women's soccer team. On January 7, 2010, she was named Director of the Competitive Program at the Del Mar Carmel Valley Sharks Soccer Club. After leaving DMCV Sharks, she was named the Director of Youth at the NWSL club Bay FC on July 21, 2026.

She was a senior adviser to San Diego Loyal SC.

== International goals ==
Scores and results list United States's goal tally first.

No.	Date	Venue	Opponent	Score	Result	Competition
1.	12 May 1996	Worcester, United States	Canada	3–0	6–0	1996 Women's U.S. Cup
2.	23 July 1996	Orlando, United States	Sweden	2–0	2–1	1996 Summer Olympics
3.	28 July 1996	Athens, United States	Norway	2–1	2–1	1996 Summer Olympics
4.	1 August 1996	Athens, United States	China	1–0	2–1	1996 Summer Olympics
5.	12 September 1998	Foxborough, United States	Mexico	?–0	9–0	1998 Women's U.S. Cup
6.	27 June 1999	Foxborough, United States	North Korea	1–0	3–0	1999 FIFA Women's World Cup
7.	12 March 2000	Albufeira, Portugal	Portugal	2–0	7–0	2000 Algarve Cup
8.	14 March 2000	Faro, Portugal	Denmark	2–1	2–1	2000 Algarve Cup
9.	5 May 2000	Portland, United States	Mexico	1–0	8–0	2000 Women's U.S. Cup
10.	5 May 2000	Portland, United States	Mexico	6–0	8–0	2000 Women's U.S. Cup
11.	23 June 2000	Hershey, United States	Trinidad and Tobago	7–0	11–0	2000 CONCACAF Women's Gold Cup
12.	25 June 2000	Louisville, United States	Costa Rica	2–0	8–0	2000 CONCACAF Women's Gold Cup
13.	1 July 2000	Louisville, United States	Canada	1–0	4–1	2000 CONCACAF Women's Gold Cup
14.	1 July 2000	Louisville, United States	Canada	2–0	4–1	2000 CONCACAF Women's Gold Cup
15.	20 September 2000	Melbourne, Australia	Nigeria	3–1	3–1	2000 Summer Olympics
16.	1 March 2002	Albufeira, Portugal	Sweden	1–0	1–1	2002 Algarve Cup
17.	3 March 2002	Ferreiras, Portugal	England	1–0	2–0	2002 Algarve Cup
18.	5 March 2002	Faro, Portugal	Norway	1–0	2–3	2002 Algarve Cup
19.	5 March 2002	Faro, Portugal	Norway	2–2	2–3	2002 Algarve Cup
20.	7 March 2002	Albufeira, Portugal	Denmark	1–0	3–2	2002 Algarve Cup
21.	7 March 2002	Albufeira, Portugal	Denmark	2–0	3–2	2002 Algarve Cup
22.	7 March 2002	Albufeira, Portugal	Denmark	3–1	3–2	2002 Algarve Cup
23.	27 October 2002	Pasadena, United States	Mexico	3–0	3–0	2002 CONCACAF Women's Gold Cup
24.	2 November 2002	Seattle, United States	Panama	4–0	9–0	2002 CONCACAF Women's Gold Cup
25.	2 November 2002	Seattle, United States	Panama	5–0	9–0	2002 CONCACAF Women's Gold Cup
26.	6 November 2002	Seattle, United States	Costa Rica	6–0	7–0	2002 CONCACAF Women's Gold Cup
27.	16 March 2003	Ferreiras, Portugal	Norway	1–0	1–0	2003 Algarve Cup
28.	20 March 2003	Loulé, Portugal	China	1–0	2–0	2003 Algarve Cup
29.	27 February 2004	Heredia, Costa Rica	Haiti	4–0	8–0	2004 CONCACAF Women's Pre-Olympic Tournament

== See also ==
- List of Olympic medalists in football
- List of 1996 Summer Olympics medal winners
- List of 2000 Summer Olympics medal winners
- History of the United States women's national soccer team
