= Tiffeny Milbrett =

American soccer player (born 1972)

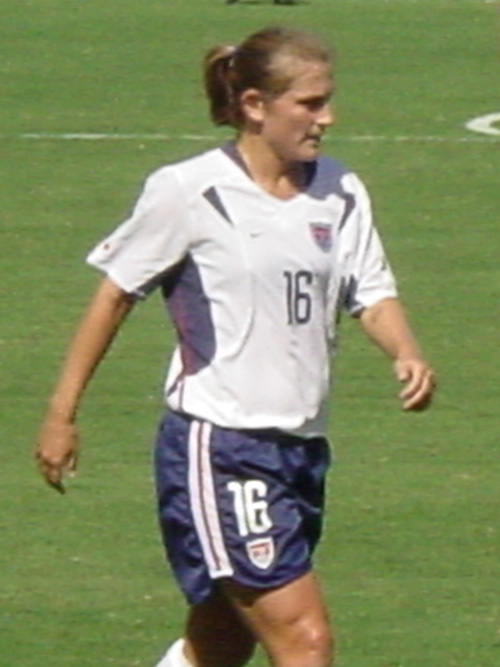
- Milbrett in 2003

Personal information
- Full name: Tiffeny Carleen Milbrett
- Date of birth: October 23, 1972 (age 54)
- Place of birth: Portland, Oregon, U.S.
- Height: 5 ft 2 in (1.57 m)
- Position: Forward

Youth career
- 1983–1986: Hillsboro Soccer Club
- 1987–1990: Hillsboro High School

College career
Years	Team	Apps	(Gls)
1990–1994	Portland Pilots		

Senior career*
Years	Team	Apps	(Gls)
1995–1997	Shiroki F.C. Serena		
2001–2003	New York Power	50	(31)
2005	Sunnanå SK	5	(5)
2006–2008	Vancouver Whitecaps	32	(25)
2006–2007	Linköpings FC		
2009–2010	FC Gold Pride	40	(10)
2011	Bay Area Breeze		

International career^{‡}
1990	United States B	?	(1)
1991–2005	United States	206	(100)
Medal record
Women's football (soccer)
Representing the United States
Olympic Games
Gold medal – first place	1996 Atlanta	Team competition
Silver medal – second place	2000 Sydney	Team competition
FIFA Women's World Cup
Gold medal – first place	1999 USA	Team competition
Bronze medal – third place	1995 Sweden	Team competition
Bronze medal – third place	2003 USA	Team competition
- * Club domestic league appearances and goals as of 07:34, April 10, 2010 (UTC) ‡ National team caps and goals as of 07:40, April 20, 2009 (UTC)

Tiffeny Carleen Milbrett (born October 23, 1972) is an American former professional soccer forward who was a longtime member of the United States women's national team. In May 2018, the National Soccer Hall of Fame announced Milbrett will be enshrined in the Hall. A native of Oregon, she starred at the University of Portland where she scored a then school record 103 goals during her career. She won an Olympic gold medal in 1996 in Atlanta and a silver medal at the 2000 Olympics in Sydney. She also played in three World Cups, winning in 1999. She is in the top five all-time in the United States national soccer team in three offensive categories.

== Early life ==
Milbrett was born in Portland, Oregon, on October 23, 1972. She started her soccer career playing for the Hillsboro Soccer Club in Hillsboro, Oregon, in the Portland metropolitan area. Milbrett grew up in Hillsboro, attending W. Verne McKinney Elementary School in the northwest part of the city. She attended Hillsboro High School (Hilhi) in Hillsboro from 1987 to 1990, where she graduated holding Oregon's state record for goals in a season with 54; and in a career with 131. One of the fields at Hilhi is named after her. She was a three-time Oregonian 3A Player of the Year and a two-time Parade All-American. She also was a talented basketball player and Track and Field participant, and she was offered college scholarships at those two sports.

== University of Portland ==
Milbrett attended the University of Portland where she lettered with the Clive Charles-coached Pilots in 1990, 1991, 1992 and 1994. She left the school with various awards and National Collegiate Athletic Association (NCAA) records. In 1990, she was named Soccer America's Freshman Soccer Player of The Year, and in 1991, she led her team with 21 goals and six assists. In 1992, her 30 goals and 12 assists placed her second among the nation's scorers, and in 1994, she helped her team reach the soccer Final Four, making the All-Tournament Team.

Milbrett also garnered West Coast Offensive Player of The Year awards in 1992 and 1994, and was a three-time NSCAA All-American as well as a three time finalist for the Hermann Trophy and Missouri Athletic Club Award. Milbrett was her university's all-time leader in goals with 103, and assists with 40. She placed second in NCAA career goals with 103, and tied for fourth in career points with 246. She was also named to Soccer America's College Team of The Decade for the 1990s.

== Club career ==
=== Shiroki Serena ===
Professionally, Milbrett began her career in Japan, when she traveled to after graduating in 1995 and joined the Shiroki Serena of the L. League. She played on that team until 1997.

=== WUSA ===
In 2001, she became a founding member of the New York Power in the Women's United Soccer Association (WUSA). She was the league's MVP as well as Offensive Player of The Year. She scored the league's first hat trick ever, when the Power beat the Boston Breakers 3–1. She was named to the WUSA's second team in 2002, when she finished eighth in the league in points.

=== Sunnanå SK, Linköpings FC, Vancouver Whitecaps ===
In March 2005, Milbrett went to Sweden for two months to fine-tune her game, scoring five goals for Sunnanå SK during her brief stint. She also played for Linköpings FC in the Swedish Damallsvenskan, having transferred there from the Vancouver Whitecaps Women of the United Soccer Leagues W-League.

=== FC Gold Pride ===
In March 2009, Milbrett was selected to play with FC Gold Pride of the new Women's Professional Soccer and began play in April 2009. In her first appearance with FC Gold Pride, she scored the game-winning goal. For the 2009 season she scored 4 goals in 19 games.

== International career ==
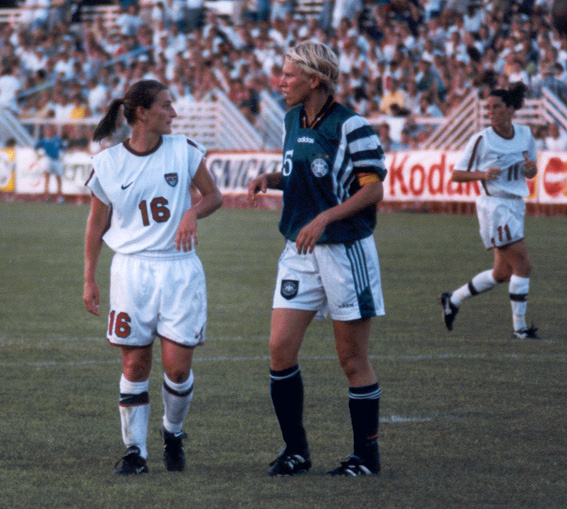
Milbrett in St. Louis against Germany, 1998

Milbrett was a member of the US-under 20 team from 1990 to 1993, and saw her first action with the United States women's national soccer team in 1991, against China. She scored her first goal with that selection in 1992, against Norway, and helped the team win the International Women's Tournament in France in 1993. She played a total of 21 games with the senior team during that period, and in 1995, she finally joined the senior team full-time. She was a member of the team that finished third at the World Cup that year in Sweden, and in 1996, she became a starter for the team that won the 1996 Olympic gold medal in Atlanta, scoring the game-winning goal in the gold medal game against China. In 1997, she set a women's national team record with five assists in a game against Australia, and in 1998, she was a member of the team that won the gold medal at the Goodwill Games.

In 1999, she was the goal leader on the US team that won the World Cup, and in 2000 she helped the team obtain Olympic Games silver in Sydney. She was named the CONCACAF Offensive Player of The Year that same year, as well as Chevrolet's female athlete of the year. She was also nominated along with Hamm and Sun Wen for the first ever FIFA World Player of the Year award, and participated in the 2001 Nike Women's Cup. She also won the Chevrolet Female Athlete of the Year Award for the second time in a row in 2001.

She stepped away from the national team in December 2003 due to philosophical differences with manager April Heinrichs. Milbrett preferred a more creative style of play to which she was more accustomed from her time at the University of Portland, while Heinrichs favored a more tactical brand of soccer which valued speed, athleticism and versatility. She argued, "My philosophy about the game, for instance, is that you have players out there who really do different things. You can't ask every player to do the same thing. That's why we have amazing midfielders, defenders, forwards and keepers. You can't ask them to be of the same mold."

After Heinrichs resigned in February 2005 and was replaced by Greg Ryan, Milbrett returned to the national team, and finally earned her elusive 200th cap on June 30 in a friendly against rivals Canada in Virginia Beach, Virginia. Her 100th goal came in Team USA's next match, a friendly against Ukraine in her hometown of Portland at Merlo Field.

=== International goals ===
No.	Date	Venue	Opponent	Score	Result	Competition
1.	August 16, 1992	New Brian, United States	Norway	1–?	2–4	Friendly
2.	June 12, 1993	Columbus, United States	Canada	?–0	7–0	Friendly
3.	March 16, 1994	Silves, Portugal	Portugal	4–0	5–0	1994 Algarve Cup
4.	August 19, 1994	Montreal, Canada	Jamaica	?–0	10–0	1994 CONCACAF Women's Championship
5.	March 16, 1995	Portimão, Portugal	Portugal	?–0	3–0	1995 Algarve Cup
6.	April 12, 1995	Saint-Maur-des-Fossés, France	Canada	?–0	5–0	Friendly
7.	May 14, 1995	Portland, United States	Brazil	1–?	4–1	Friendly
8.	May 19, 1995	Dallas, United States	Canada	9–?	9–1	Friendly
9.	May 22, 1995	Edmonton, Canada	Canada	1–1	2–1	Friendly
10.	June 6, 1995	Gävle, Sweden	China	2–0	3–3	1995 FIFA Women's World Cup
11.	June 8, 1995	Gävle, Sweden	Denmark	2–0	2–0	1995 FIFA Women's World Cup
12.	June 13, 1995	Gävle, Sweden	Japan	3–0	4–0	1995 FIFA Women's World Cup
13.	January 14, 1996	Campinas, Brazil	Russia	8–?	8–1	Friendly
14.	January 16, 1996	Campinas, Brazil	Brazil	3–?	3–2	Friendly
15.	January 18, 1996	Campinas, Brazil	Ukraine	6–0	6–0	Friendly
16.	January 20, 1996	Campinas, Brazil	Brazil	1–?	1–1 (3–2 p)	Friendly
17.	February 2, 1996	Tampa, United States	Norway	3–2	3–2	Friendly
18.	February 17, 1996	Houston, United States	Sweden	2–0	3–0	Friendly
19.	March 14, 1996	Decatur, United States	Germany	4–0	6–0	Friendly
20.	March 14, 1996	Decatur, United States	Germany	6–0	6–0	Friendly
21.	March 16, 1996	Davidson, United States	Germany	1–0	2–0	Friendly
22.	April 28, 1996	Indianapolis, United States	France	4–0	8–2	Friendly
23.	May 12, 1996	Worcester, United States	Canada	2–0	6–0	1996 Women's U.S. Cup
24.	July 21, 1996	Orlando, United States	Denmark	3–0	3–0	1996 Summer Olympics
25.	August 1, 1996	Athens, United States	China	2–1	2–1	1996 Summer Olympics
26.	March 5, 1997	Canberra, Australia	Australia	3–0	3–0	Friendly
27.	May 2, 1997	Milwaukee, United States	South Korea	4–0	7–0	Friendly
28.	May 2, 1997	Milwaukee, United States	South Korea	6–0	7–0	Friendly
29.	May 11, 1997	Portland, United States	England	3–0	6–0	Friendly
30.	May 31, 1997	New Brian, United States	Canada	1–0	4–0	1997 Women's U.S. Cup
31.	June 5, 1997	Ambler, United States	Australia	1–0	9–1	1997 Women's U.S. Cup
32.	October 12, 1997	Salzgitter, Germany	Germany	2–0	3–0	Friendly
33.	October 30, 1997	Chattanooga, United States	Sweden	2–?	3–1	Friendly
34.	January 18, 1998	Guangzhou, China	Sweden	2–0	3–0	1998 Four Nations Tournament
35.	April 24, 1998	Fullerton, United States	Argentina	1–1	8–1	Friendly
36.	April 24, 1998	Fullerton, United States	Argentina	2–1	8–1	Friendly
37.	April 24, 1998	Fullerton, United States	Argentina	4–1	8–1	Friendly
38.	April 26, 1998	San Jose, United States	Argentina	2–0	7–0	Friendly
39.	April 26, 1998	San Jose, United States	Argentina	4–0	7–0	Friendly
40.	May 8, 1998	Indianapolis, United States	Iceland	1–0	6–0	Friendly
41.	May 30, 1998	Washington D.C., United States	New Zealand	5–0	5–0	Friendly
42.	July 25, 1998	Uniondale, United States	Denmark	1–0	5–0	1998 Goodwill Games
43.	August 2, 1998	Orlando, United States	Canada	3–0	4–0	Friendly
44.	September 12, 1998	Foxborough, United States	Mexico	3–0	9–0	1998 Women's U.S. Cup
45.	September 18, 1998	Rochester, United States	Russia	1–0	4–0	1998 Women's U.S. Cup
46.	September 18, 1998	Rochester, United States	Russia	2–0	4–0	1998 Women's U.S. Cup
47.	December 20, 1998	Fresno, United States	Ukraine	1–0	5–0	Friendly
48.	March 14, 1999	Silves, Portugal	Sweden	1–0	1–1	1999 Algarve Cup
49.	March 16, 1999	Quarteira, Portugal	Finland	1–0	4–0	1999 Algarve Cup
50.	March 16, 1999	Quarteira, Portugal	Finland	3–0	4–0	1999 Algarve Cup
51.	March 20, 1999	Loulé, Portugal	China	1–1	1–2	1999 Algarve Cup
52.	April 29, 1999	Charlotte, United States	Japan	4–0	9–0	Friendly
53.	April 29, 1999	Charlotte, United States	Japan	6–0	9–0	Friendly
54.	April 29, 1999	Charlotte, United States	Japan	8–0	9–0	Friendly
55.	April 29, 1999	Charlotte, United States	Japan	9–0	9–0	Friendly
56.	May 13, 1999	Milwaukee, United States	Netherlands	1–0	5–0	Friendly
57.	May 22, 1999	Orlando, United States	Brazil	3–0	3–0	Friendly
58.	June 3, 1999	Beaverton, United States	Australia	4–0	4–0	Friendly
59.	June 6, 1999	Portland, United States	Canada	2–1	4–2	Friendly
60.	June 24, 1999	Chicago, United States	Nigeria	3–1	7–1	1999 FIFA Women's World Cup
61.	June 24, 1999	Chicago, United States	Nigeria	7–1	7–1	1999 FIFA Women's World Cup
62.	July 1, 1999	Landover, United States	Germany	1–1	3–2	1999 FIFA Women's World Cup
63.	September 4, 1999	Foxborough, United States	Republic of Ireland	1–0	5–0	Friendly
64.	September 4, 1999	Foxborough, United States	Republic of Ireland	3–0	5–0	Friendly
65.	September 26, 1999	Denver, United States	Brazil	1–0	6–0	Friendly
66.	September 26, 1999	Denver, United States	Brazil	4–0	6–0	Friendly
67.	October 3, 1999	Columbus, United States	South Korea	3–0	5–0	1999 Women's U.S. Cup
68.	October 7, 1999	Kansas City, United States	Finland	1–0	6–0	1999 Women's U.S. Cup
69.	May 5, 2000	Portland, United States	Mexico	4–0	8–0	2000 Women's U.S. Cup
70.	May 7, 2000	Portland, United States	Canada	3–0	4–0	2000 Women's U.S. Cup
71.	June 2, 2000	Sydney, Australia	Canada	1–0	9–1	Friendly
72.	June 2, 2000	Sydney, Australia	Canada	4–0	9–1	Friendly
73.	June 2, 2000	Sydney, Australia	Canada	7–0	9–1	Friendly
74.	June 23, 2000	Hershey, United States	Trinidad and Tobago	3–0	11–0	2000 CONCACAF Women's Championship
75.	July 1, 2000	Louisville, United States	Canada	3–0	4–1	2000 CONCACAF Women's Championship
76.	July 3, 2000	Foxborough, United States	Brazil	1–0	1–0	2000 CONCACAF Women's Championship
77.	July 16, 2000	Osnabrück, Germany	Norway	1–0	1–0	Friendly
78.	August 13, 2000	Annapolis, United States	Russia	1–0	7–1	Friendly
79.	August 13, 2000	Annapolis, United States	Russia	3–0	7–1	Friendly
80.	September 14, 2000	Melbourne, Australia	Norway	1–0	2–0	2000 Summer Olympics
81.	September 28, 2000	Sydney, Australia	Norway	1–0	2–3 (a.e.t.)	2000 Summer Olympics
82.	September 28, 2000	Sydney, Australia	Norway	2–2	2–3 (a.e.t.)	2000 Summer Olympics
83.	November 11, 2000	Columbus, United States	Canada	1–2	1–3	Friendly
84.	June 30, 2001	Toronto, Canada	Canada	2–1	2–2	Friendly
85.	July 3, 2001	Blaine, United States	Canada	1–0	1–0	Friendly
86.	September 9, 2001	Chicago, United States	Germany	2–1	4–1	2001 Women's U.S. Cup
87.	January 27, 2002	Guangzhou, China	China	2–0	2–0	2002 Four Nations Tournament
88.	July 21, 2002	Blaine, United States	Norway	2–0	4–0	Friendly
89.	October 29, 2002	Fullerton, United States	Trinidad and Tobago	3–0	3–0	2002 CONCACAF Women's Championship
90.	November 2, 2002	Seattle, United States	Panama	1–0	9–0	2002 CONCACAF Women's Championship
91.	November 2, 2002	Seattle, United States	Panama	2–0	9–0	2002 CONCACAF Women's Championship
92.	November 2, 2002	Seattle, United States	Panama	3–0	9–0	2002 CONCACAF Women's Championship
93.	November 2, 2002	Seattle, United States	Panama	6–0	9–0	2002 CONCACAF Women's Championship
94.	November 2, 2002	Seattle, United States	Panama	7–0	9–0	2002 CONCACAF Women's Championship
95.	November 9, 2002	Pasadena, United States	Canada	1–0	2–1 (a.e.t.)	2002 CONCACAF Women's Championship
96.	January 23, 2003	Yiwu, China	China	2–1	3–1	2003 Four Nations Tournament
97.	May 17, 2003	Birmingham, United States	England	6–0	6–0	Friendly
98.	July 13, 2003	New Orleans, United States	Brazil	1–0	1–0	Friendly
99.	October 11, 2003	Carson, United States	Canada	3–1	3–1	2003 FIFA Women's World Cup
100.	July 10, 2005	Portland, United States	Ukraine	5–0	7–0	Friendly

== Coaching career ==
She coached at Northwest Soccer Camp as well as at day camps, personal training and Elite Team Training Sessions, and women's clinics. Milbrett is a member of the People to People Ambassador Programs. She coached the MVLA Tornado girls' team. She also coaches for the ECNL girls team.

== See also ==
- List of association women football players with 100 or more international goals
- List of footballers with 100 or more caps
- List of Olympic medalists in football
- List of 1996 Summer Olympics medal winners
- List of 2000 Summer Olympics medal winners
- List of American and Canadian soccer champions
- All-time FC Gold Pride roster
- List of people from Hillsboro, Oregon
- List of Vancouver Whitecaps Women players
