= Cidinha =

Brazilian footballer (born 1976)

- Cidinha at the 2000 Sydney Olympics

Personal information
- Full name: Maria Aparecida Souza Dias
- Date of birth: 6 October 1976 (age 50)
- Place of birth: Campo Grande, Mato Grosso do Sul, Brazil
- Height: 5 ft 4 in (1.63 m)
- Position: Defender

Senior career*
Years	Team	Apps	(Gls)
- São Paulo
- Palmeiras
- Vasco da Gama

International career^{‡}
1996–2000	Brazil		
- * Club domestic league appearances and goals as of 22:52, 30 September 2009 (UTC) ‡ National team caps and goals as of 22:52, 30 September 2009 (UTC)

Maria Aparecida Souza Dias, known as Cidinha (born 6 October 1976) is a Brazilian former footballer. She scored two goals in the 1999 FIFA Women's World Cup, against Nigeria, before the team was knocked out in the semi-finals.

In 1997 Cidinha played for São Paulo FC when they won the Campeonato Paulista de Futebol Feminino, scoring twice in the 4–0 final win over Lusa Sant'Anna. She was called up to Brazil's squad for the 1999 FIFA Women's World Cup as a Palmeiras player. As a Vasco player, she was also a member of the Brazil team that participated in the 2000 Sydney Olympics and finished in fourth place.

In 2003 Cidinha retired from football, returned to her hometown, and took up employment as a yard inspector in a private school.
