= Michael Jackson (footballer, born 1963) =

Brazilian footballer

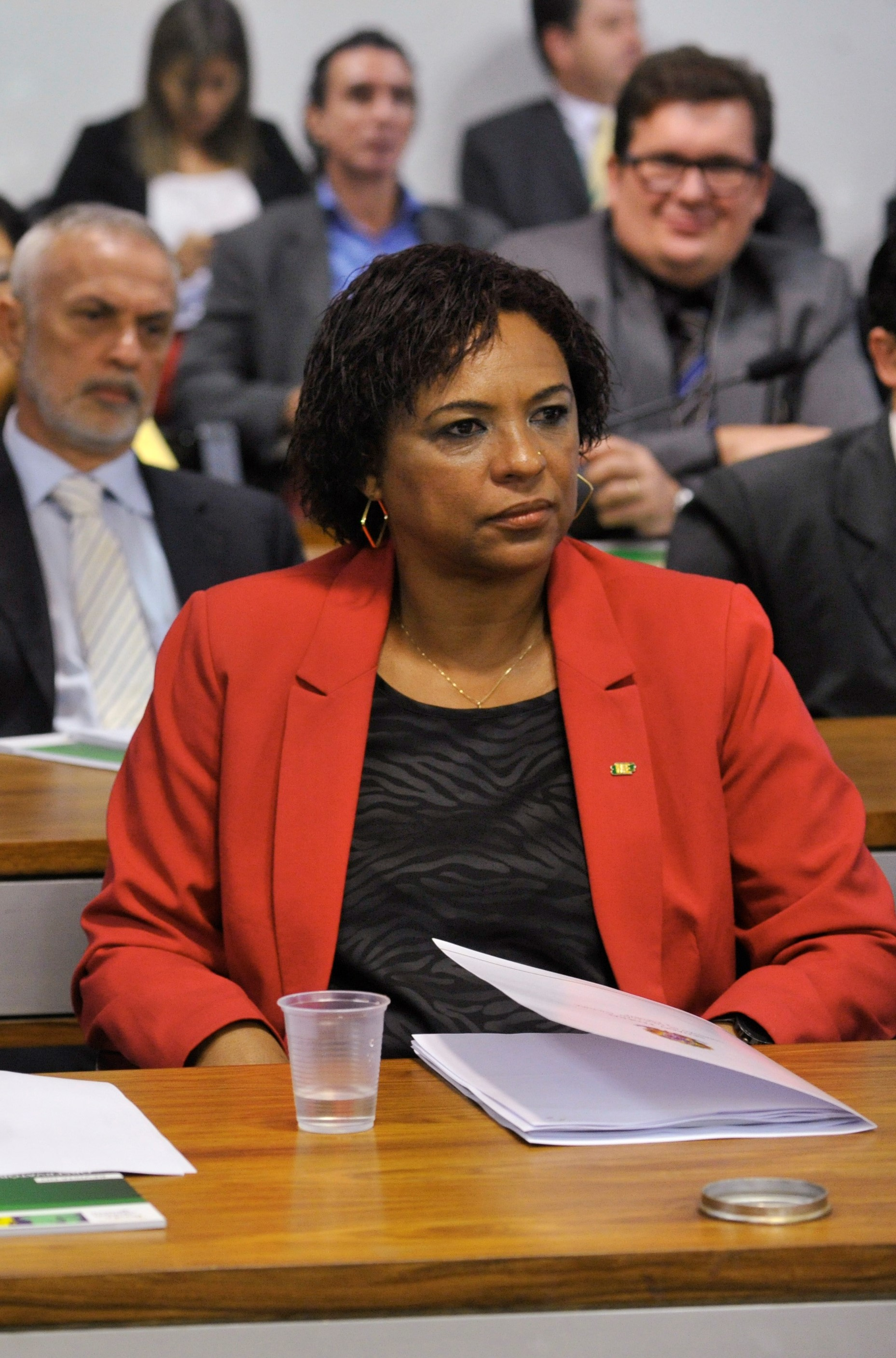
- Michael Jackson in 2015

Personal information
- Full name: Mariléia dos Santos
- Date of birth: 19 November 1963 (age 62)
- Place of birth: Valença, Rio de Janeiro, Brazil
- Height: 5 ft 6 in (1.68 m)
- Position: Striker

Senior career*
Years	Team	Apps	(Gls)
1983–1989	Radar		
1990–1995	Saad		
1995–1997	Torino		
- Corinthians
- Santos
- Internacional
- Vasco da Gama

International career^{‡}
1988–2000	Brazil		
- * Club domestic league appearances and goals as of 22:52, 30 September 2009 (UTC) ‡ National team caps and goals as of 22:52, 30 September 2009 (UTC)

Mariléia dos Santos (born 19 November 1963), commonly known as Michael Jackson, is a Brazilian former footballer who played as a striker for the Brazil women's national football team.

== Early life ==
Mariléia dos Santos had 10 siblings, and they all liked football, making her choose the sport. The nickname "Michael Jackson" was an homage to the singer, used by both her teammates and given by television commentator Luciano do Valle. Speaking in May 1999, United States player Julie Foudy did not see much resemblance: "She didn't really look like Michael Jackson, but she did wear one glove."

== Career ==
Michael Jackson began her professional career at EC Radar, and in 1988 she represented Brazil at the FIFA Women's Invitation Tournament in Guangdong, finishing in third place.

After her appearance with Brazil in the 1995 FIFA Women's World Cup, Michael Jackson accepted a contract offer from Italian Serie A club Torino.

Michael Jackson played for the Brazil women's national football team at the 1995 FIFA Women's World Cup, as well as at the Olympic debut of women's football in 1996.

== Retirement ==
Michael Jackson retired from playing aged 46, with a reported 1,574 goals to her credit. In 2011, she took a job at a newly created woman's football division of the Brazilian Ministry of Sports, helping develop more tournaments for the mostly neglected female version.

She was named joint third place in the International Federation of Football History & Statistics (IFFHS) South America's best Women's Footballer of the Century list, in a list completely populated by her national teammates; she was tied with Roseli.
