= Football at the 2000 Summer Olympics – Women's tournament =

2000 Women's Olympic Football Tournament

Tournament details
- Host country: Australia
- Dates: 13–28 September
- Teams: 8 (from 6 confederations)
- Venues: 3 (in 3 host cities)

Final positions
- Champions: Norway (1st title)
- Runners-up: United States
- Third place: Germany
- Fourth place: Brazil

Tournament statistics
- Matches played: 16
- Goals scored: 42 (2.63 per match)
- Attendance: 326,215 (20,388 per match)
- Top scorer: (China) Sun Wen (4 goals)
- Fair play award: Germany

The football tournament at the 2000 Summer Olympics was the second edition of the women's Olympic football tournament and was held from 13 to 28 September 2000. It was hosted at three venues along the Eastern side of Australia with matches being held in Sydney, Canberra and Melbourne.

The tournament features eight women's national teams from six continental confederations with the qualification coming from the previous year's World Cup. The eight teams were drawn into two groups of four and each group plays a round-robin tournament. At the end of the group stage, the top two teams advanced to the knockout stage, beginning with the semi-finals and culminating with the gold medal match at the Sydney Football Stadium.

At the end of the group stage, Brazil, Germany, Norway and the United States qualified through to the knockout stage. After Norway and the United States both won the semi-finals, the final was played on the 28 September 2000. The match would go to extra time, with a controversial handball in the 102nd minute from Dagny Mellgren securing Norway the gold medal as they won 3–2. Germany won the bronze medal defeating Brazil 2–0.

== Medal winners ==
Gold	Silver	Bronze
Norway Gro Espeseth; Bente Nordby; Marianne Pettersen; Hege Riise; Kristin Bekkevold; Ragnhild Gulbrandsen; Solveig Gulbrandsen; Margunn Haugenes; Ingeborg Hovland; Christine Bøe Jensen; Silje Jørgensen; Monica Knudsen; Gøril Kringen; Anne Tønnessen; Unni Lehn; Dagny Mellgren; Anita Rapp; Brit Sandaune; Bente Kvitland	United States Brandi Chastain; Joy Fawcett; Julie Foudy; Mia Hamm; Michelle French; Kristine Lilly; Tiffeny Milbrett; Carla Overbeck; Cindy Parlow; Briana Scurry; Lorrie Fair; Shannon MacMillan; Siri Mullinix; Christie Pearce; Nikki Serlenga; Danielle Slaton; Kate Sobrero; Sara Whalen	Germany Ariane Hingst; Melanie Hoffmann; Steffi Jones; Renate Lingor; Maren Meinert; Sandra Minnert; Claudia Müller; Birgit Prinz; Silke Rottenberg; Kerstin Stegemann; Bettina Wiegmann; Tina Wunderlich; Nicole Brandebusemeyer; Nadine Angerer; Doris Fitschen; Jeannette Götte; Stefanie Gottschlich; Inka Grings

== Venues ==
The tournament was held in three venues across three cities:

- Bruce Stadium, Canberra
- Melbourne Cricket Ground, Melbourne
- Sydney Football Stadium, Sydney

== Qualification ==
The seven best quarter-finalists at the 1999 FIFA Women's World Cup and the host nation Australia qualified for the 2000 Olympic women's football tournament.

Africa (CAF)

- Nigeria

Asia (AFC)

- China

North and Central America (CONCACAF)

- United States

South America (CONMEBOL)

- Brazil

Europe (UEFA)

- Germany
- Norway
- Sweden

Oceania (OFC)

- Australia – host nation

== Seeding ==
Pot 1	Pot 2
Australia (hosts); United States; China; Brazil	Germany; Nigeria; Norway; Sweden

== Match officials ==
Referees
Confederation	Referee
AFC	Im Eun-ju (South Korea)
CAF	Bola Abidoye (Nigeria)
CONCACAF	Sonia Denoncourt (Canada)
CONCACAF	Sandra Hunt (United States)
CONMEBOL	Martha Toro (Colombia)
OFC	Tammy Ogston (Australia)
UEFA	Vibeke Karlsen (Norway)
UEFA	Nicole Petignat (Switzerland)
UEFA	Wendy Toms (Great Britain)

Assistant referees
Confederation	Assistant referee
AFC	Hisae Yoshizawa (Japan)
CAF	Comfort Cofie (Ghana)
CONCACAF	Jackeline Sáez Blanquice (Panama)
CONMEBOL	Ana Isabel Pérez Assante (Peru)
CONMEBOL	Cleidy Mary Nunes Ribeiro (Brazil)
OFC	Lynn Fox (New Zealand)
UEFA	Sanna Luhtanen (Finland)
UEFA	Marie-Louise Svanström (Sweden)

== Group stage ==
=== Group E ===
Team	Pld	W	D	L	GF	GA	GD	Pts
Germany	3	3	0	0	6	1	+5	9
Brazil	3	2	0	1	5	3	+2	6
Sweden	3	0	1	2	1	4	−3	1
Australia	3	0	1	2	2	6	−4	1

13 September 2000
17:00

Australia	0–3	Germany
	Report	Grings 39'; Wiegmann 70'; Lingor 90'

Bruce Stadium, Canberra
Attendance: 24,800
Referee: Bola Abidoye (Nigeria)

13 September 2000
17:00

Sweden	0–2	Brazil
	Report	Pretinha 21'; Kátia 70'

Melbourne Cricket Ground, Melbourne
Attendance: 58,432
Referee: Sandra Hunt (United States)

16 September 2000
17:00

Australia	1–1	Sweden
Salisbury 57'	Report	Andersson 66' (pen.)

Sydney Football Stadium, Sydney
Attendance: 33,600
Referee: Sonia Denoncourt (Canada)

16 September 2000
17:30

Germany	2–1	Brazil
Prinz 33', 41'	Report	Raquel 72'

Bruce Stadium, Canberra
Attendance: 17,000
Referee: Martha Toro (Colombia)

19 September 2000
17:30

Australia	1–2	Brazil
Hughes 33'	Report	Raquel 56'; Kátia 64'

Sydney Football Stadium, Sydney
Attendance: 29,400
Referee: Vibeke Karlsen (Norway)

19 September 2000
17:30

Germany	1–0	Sweden
Hingst 88'	Report

Melbourne Cricket Ground, Melbourne
Attendance: 7,000
Referee: Wendy Toms (Great Britain)

=== Group F ===
Team	Pld	W	D	L	GF	GA	GD	Pts
United States	3	2	1	0	6	2	+4	7
Norway	3	2	0	1	5	4	+1	6
China	3	1	1	1	5	4	+1	4
Nigeria	3	0	0	3	3	9	−6	0

14 September 2000
17:30

United States	2–0	Norway
Milbrett 18'; Hamm 24'	Report

Melbourne Cricket Ground, Melbourne
Attendance: 16,043
Referee: Im Eun Ju (South Korea)

14 September 2000
17:30

China	3–1	Nigeria
Zhao 12'; Sun 57', 83'	Report	Nkwocha 85' (pen.)

Bruce Stadium, Canberra
Attendance: 16,000
Referee: Martha Toro (Colombia)

17 September 2000
17:30

United States	1–1	China
Foudy 38'	Report	Sun 67'

Melbourne Cricket Ground, Melbourne
Attendance: 32,500
Referee: Nicole Petignat (Switzerland)

17 September 2000
17:30

Norway	3–1	Nigeria
Mellgren 22'; Riise 62' (pen.); Pettersen 90'	Report	Akide 78'

Bruce Stadium, Canberra
Attendance: 9,150
Referee: Tammy Ogston (Australia)

20 September 2000
17:30

United States	3–1	Nigeria
Chastain 26'; Lilly 35'; MacMillan 56'	Report	Akide 48'

Melbourne Cricket Ground, Melbourne
Attendance: 9,000
Referee: Im Eun Ju (South Korea)

20 September 2000
17:30

Norway	2–1	China
Pettersen 55'; Haugenes 78'	Report	Sun 75' (pen.)

Bruce Stadium, Canberra
Attendance: 11,532
Referee: Sonia Denoncourt (Canada)

== Knockout stage ==
Semi-finals
24 September – Sydney
Norway	1
Germany	0
24 September – Canberra
United States	1
Brazil	0

Final
28 September – Sydney
Norway	3
United States	2
Third place
28 September – Sydney
Germany	2
Brazil	0

=== Semi-finals ===
24 September 2000
17:30

Germany	0–1	Norway
	Report	Wunderlich 80' (o.g.)

Sydney Football Stadium, Sydney
Attendance: 16,710
Referee: Im Eun Ju (South Korea)

24 September 2000
17:30

United States	1–0	Brazil
Hamm 60'	Report

Bruce Stadium, Canberra
Attendance: 11,000
Referee: Nicole Petignat (Switzerland)

=== Bronze medal match ===
28 September 2000
17:00

Germany	2–0	Brazil
Lingor 64'; Prinz 79'	Report

Sydney Football Stadium, Sydney
Attendance: 11,200
Referee: Im Eun Ju (South Korea)

=== Gold medal match ===
28 September 2000
20:00

Norway	3–2 (a.e.t./g.g.)	United States
Espeseth 44'; Gulbrandsen 78'; Mellgren 102'	Report	Milbrett 5', 90'

Sydney Football Stadium, Sydney
Attendance: 22,848
Referee: Sonia Denoncourt (Canada)

== Statistics ==
=== Goalscorers ===
There were 42 goals scored in 16 matches, for an average of 2.62 goals per match. Sun Wen of China was the top scorer of the tournament with four goals.

4 goals

- (China) Sun Wen

3 goals

- (Germany) Birgit Prinz
- (United States) Tiffeny Milbrett

2 goals

- (Brazil) Kátia
- (Brazil) Raquel
- (Germany) Renate Lingor
- (Nigeria) Mercy Akide
- (Norway) Dagny Mellgren
- (Norway) Marianne Pettersen
- (United States) Mia Hamm

1 goal

- (Australia) Sunni Hughes
- (Australia) Cheryl Salisbury
- (Brazil) Pretinha
- (China) Zhao Lihong
- (Germany) Inka Grings
- (Germany) Ariane Hingst
- (Germany) Bettina Wiegmann
- (Nigeria) Perpetua Nkwocha
- (Norway) Gro Espeseth
- (Norway) Ragnhild Gulbrandsen
- (Norway) Margunn Haugenes
- (Norway) Hege Riise
- (Sweden) Malin Andersson
- (United States) Brandi Chastain
- (United States) Julie Foudy
- (United States) Kristine Lilly
- (United States) Shannon MacMillan

1 own goal

- (Germany) Tina Wunderlich (against Norway)

Source: FIFA

=== Assists ===
5 assists

- (Norway) Hege Riise

2 assists

- (Brazil) Formiga
- (Germany) Maren Meinert
- (Germany) Bettina Wiegmann
- (United States) Mia Hamm

1 assist

- (Australia) Sharon Black
- (Brazil) Kátia
- (Brazil) Pretinha
- (China) Liu Ailing
- (Germany) Inka Grings
- (Germany) Birgit Prinz
- (Norway) Ragnhild Gulbrandsen
- (United States) Julie Foudy
- (United States) Shannon MacMillan
- (United States) Tiffeny Milbrett
- (United States) Carla Overbeck

Source: FIFA

=== FIFA Fair Play Award ===
- Winner: Germany

Germany won the FIFA Fair Play Award, given to the team with the best record of fair play during the tournament.

=== Tournament ranking ===
Per statistical convention in football, matches decided in extra time are counted as wins and losses, while matches decided by penalty shoot-outs are counted as draws.

Pos	Grp	Team	Pld	W	D	L	GF	GA	GD	Pts	Final result
1	F	Norway	5	4	0	1	9	6	+3	12	Gold medal
2	F	United States	5	3	1	1	9	5	+4	10	Silver medal
3	E	Germany	5	4	0	1	8	2	+6	12	Bronze medal
4	E	Brazil	5	2	0	3	5	6	−1	6	Fourth place
5	F	China	3	1	1	1	5	4	+1	4	Eliminated in group stage
6	E	Sweden	3	0	1	2	1	4	−3	1	Eliminated in group stage
7	E	Australia (H)	3	0	1	2	2	6	−4	1	Eliminated in group stage
8	F	Nigeria	3	0	0	3	3	9	−6	0	Eliminated in group stage

Source: FIFA
(H) Hosts
