= Roseli =

Brazilian footballer

Personal information
- Full name: Roseli de Belo
- Date of birth: 7 September 1969 (age 57)
- Place of birth: São Paulo, Brazil
- Height: 1.56 m (5 ft 1 1/2 in)
- Position: Forward

Senior career*
Years	Team	Apps	(Gls)
- Radar
- Juventus-SP
- Euroexport
1995–1997	Takarazuka Bunnys		
- Corinthians
- São Paulo
- Vasco da Gama
2001	Washington Freedom	11	(0)
2002	Kansas City Mystics		
- Saad

International career^{‡}
- Brazil
Medal record
Representing Brazil
Football
Olympic Games
Silver medal – second place	2004 Athens	Team competition
- * Club domestic league appearances and goals as of 22:52, 17 April 2013 (UTC) ‡ National team caps and goals as of 22:52, 17 April 2013 (UTC)

Roseli de Belo (born 7 September 1969), commonly known as Roseli, is a Brazilian footballer who played as a forward for the Brazil women's national football team.

She represented Brazil at the FIFA Women's World Cup in 1991 and 1995; as well as in the inaugural Olympic women's football tournament in 1996. She also played in the 2000 Olympics and was part of Brazil's silver medal-winning squad in 2004.

Roseli played professional club football in Japan with Takarazuka Bunnys and in the United States with Washington Freedom.

== Club career ==
From 1995 until 1997 Roseli played professional football in the Japanese L. League with Takarazuka Bunnys.

When the professional Women's United Soccer Association (WUSA) started in 2001, Roseli and compatriot Pretinha were assigned to Washington Freedom in the inaugural draft. Washington performed poorly in their first season and bought out Roseli's contract after she failed to score in 11 appearances, only three of which were starts.

== International career ==
Roseli was part of the EC Radar club team who represented Brazil at the 1988 FIFA Women's Invitation Tournament in Guangdong and finished in third place. The Chinese press voted her into the tournament's official all–star team.

At the 1991 FIFA Women's World Cup Roseli started Brazil's first ever World Cup match; a 1–0 group stage win over Japan in Foshan. Four years later she scored the only goal as Brazil shocked hosts Sweden 1–0 in the opening match of the 1995 FIFA Women's World Cup.

In December 1997 Roseli scored another game-winning goal, against the United States in her native São Paulo, giving Brazil their first ever victory over their American rivals.

Roseli scored 15 goals in qualifying for the 1999 FIFA Women's World Cup, but a knee injury sustained against the United States in 1998 kept her out of the final tournament. Without Roseli, Brazil reached the semi-final but were knocked out by the United States. She returned to the national team for yet another match against the United States in September 1999.

When Brazil named their squad for the 2000 Olympics in Sydney, Roseli was included. She featured as a substitute in Brazil's 1–0 semi final defeat to the United States.

She was named equal third (level with Michael Jackson, behind Pretinha and Sissi) in the International Federation of Football History & Statistics (IFFHS) South America's best Women's Footballer of the Century list.

In October 2006, Roseli travelled with a São Paulo select team to participate in the Peace Queen Cup in South Korea.
