= Nenê (footballer, born 1976) =

Brazilian footballer

Personal information
- Full name: Elissandra Regina Cavalcanti
- Date of birth: 31 March 1976 (age 50)
- Place of birth: Brazil
- Position: Defender

Senior career*
Years	Team	Apps	(Gls)
1996	Saad		

International career
1996–2000	Brazil		
- * Club domestic league appearances and goals

Elissandra Regina Cavalcanti (born 31 March 1976), commonly known as Nenê, is a female Brazilian former football defender. She was part of the Brazil women's national football team.

She competed at the 1996 Summer Olympics, playing 5 matches. On club level she played for Saad EC. Nenê remained in Brazil's squad at the 1999 FIFA Women's World Cup, by which time she was playing for São Paulo FC.

== See also ==
- Brazil at the 1996 Summer Olympics
