= Pretinha =

Brazilian footballer

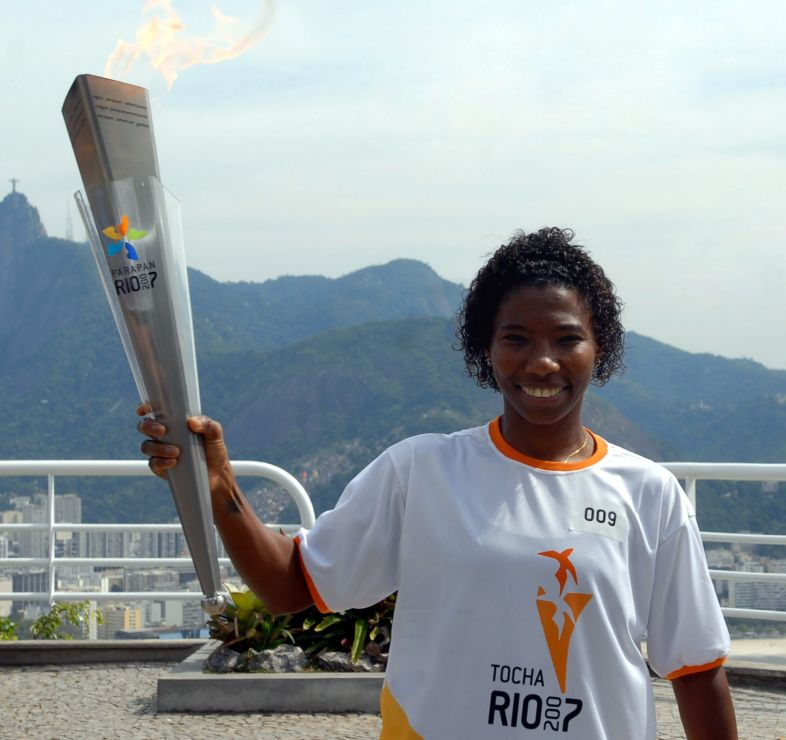
- Pretinha in 2007

Personal information
- Full name: Delma Gonçalves
- Date of birth: 19 May 1975 (age 51)
- Place of birth: Rio de Janeiro, Brazil
- Height: 1.57 m (5 ft 2 in)
- Position: Forward

Senior career*
Years	Team	Apps	(Gls)
1989–1991	Mendanha FC		
1992–2000	Vasco da Gama		
2001	Washington Freedom	21	(5)
2002–2003	San Jose CyberRays	34	(9)
2005–2008	INAC Kobe Leonessa		
2009–2017	Icheon Daekyo		(49)

International career^{‡}
1991–2014	Brazil	68	(42)
Medal record
Representing Brazil
Football
Olympic Games
Silver medal – second place	2004 Athens	Team
Silver medal – second place	2008 Beijing	Team
- * Club domestic league appearances and goals as of 19:31, 4 January 2023 (UTC) ‡ National team caps and goals as of 19:31, 4 January 2023 (UTC)

Delma Gonçalves (born 19 May 1975), commonly known as Pretinha, (Note: In a June 1999 interview with Grant Wahl, Pretinha said her nickname means "little black girl" and that the reference to skin color is not considered problematic in Brazil.) is a Brazilian professional association football coach and former forward. A longtime member of the Brazil national team, for whom she debuted in 1991, she played for clubs in Brazil, the United States and Japan before moving to Icheon Daekyo of South Korea's WK-League in 2009.

With the Brazilian national team, Pretinha participated in four World Cups; in China (1991), Sweden (1995), United States (1999), and China (2007). She has also played in four Olympic Games; in Atlanta (1996), Sydney (2000), Athens (2004) and Beijing (2008). She won silver medals from the 2004 and 2008 Olympic tournaments.

== Club career ==
As a child, Pretinha had played football with her brothers on the streets of Rio. She joined her first club Mendanha Futebol Clube at the age of 14. After being elevated to the Brazil national team, she was signed by the female section of Vasco da Gama. At the time of the 1999 Women's World Cup in the United States, Pretinha was earning around $3,400 per month from her contract with Vasco.

When the American professional Women's United Soccer Association (WUSA) started in 2001, Pretinha and compatriot Roseli were assigned to Washington Freedom in the inaugural draft. Pretinha scored the only goal in the league's first ever match; a second half penalty kick at the Bay Area CyberRays. With four goals in her first five games Pretinha led the early season scoring charts, she finished the campaign with five goals having played in all 21 league games. At the end of the inaugural season Washington traded Pretinha to the CyberRays.

During her first season with her new club in 2002, coach Ian Sawyers handed Pretinha a deeper midfield role. In June 2003 she scored twice at Washington Freedom to salvage a draw for the CyberRays against her old club. The team's top-goalscorer, Pretinha missed the culmination of the CyberRays' 2003 campaign after tearing the anterior cruciate ligament in her right knee during an international friendly between Brazil and the United States in July 2003.

With the collapse of WUSA and the lack of structure in Brazil women's football, Pretinha was without a club while recuperating from her injury. She played in the Athens Olympics as a free agent, then joined Japanese L. League team INAC Kobe Leonessa in 2005. In March 2009 she joined Icheon Daekyo, becoming the first foreign professional to join the new WK-League in South Korea.

== International career ==
When the Brazil women's national football team were preparing for the inaugural 1991 FIFA Women's World Cup, they played a training match against a Liga Desportiva de Nova Iguaçu (LDNI) select team containing a 16-year-old Pretinha. Brazil won easily but Pretinha excelled to the extent that she was added to the national team panel for the World Cup. The aeroplane journey to Guangdong in China was the first time that the young Pretinha had travelled outside the state of Rio.

In China Pretinha featured in Brazil's last two group games; being unused in the 1–0 win over Japan then playing as a substitute in defeats by the United States (0–5) and Sweden (0–2). The Brazil women's national team did not play another match for over three years, until a sponsorship from Maizena corn starch allowed them to play in the 1995 South American Women's Football Championship. Pretinha remained in the squad, one of 10 Vasco players to be included, and scored six goals in Brazil's successful campaign.

At the 1995 FIFA Women's World Cup in Sweden, Pretinha scored in a 2–1 defeat by Japan. Brazil finished at the bottom of Group A, but qualified for the 1996 Atlanta Olympics on account of England having no agreement to represent Great Britain. At the Olympics Pretinha was the joint-top goalscorer with four goals, as Brazil finished in fourth place after a 3–2 defeat in the bronze medal match by Norway.

Still playing for Vasco da Gama, Pretinha remained a key player for Brazil at the 1999 FIFA Women's World Cup. A tournament preview on the SoccerTimes.com website pointed out she had scored two goals in each of her previous two games and called her: "a force at midfield or forward". She was a member of the Brazil team that participated in the 2000 Sydney Olympics and again finished in fourth place.

The knee injury sustained by Pretinha in July 2003 ruled her out of Brazil's squad for the 2003 FIFA Women's World Cup. Despite being without a club, she was restored to the national team for the 2004 Athens Olympics. She scored in both the 1–0 semi-final win over Sweden and the 2–1 overtime final defeat by the United States, as Brazil collected silver medals.

She remained in the national selection for the 2007 Pan American Games, but was predominantly a reserve player. She was disappointed not to start the final, staged at Maracanã Stadium in her home city, but did come on as a late substitute. As an experienced 32-year-old veteran, she was called up for her fourth World Cup in 2007. She was a substitute in the final, which Brazil lost 2–0 to Germany.

Pretinha participated at the 2008 Beijing Olympics. She won another silver medal when Brazil lost the final 1–0 after extra time to the United States. That was her final contribution at national team level, until she was called up six years later, aged 39, for a friendly match in France.

== International goals ==
No.	Date	Venue	Opponent	Score	Result	Competition
1.	8 January 1995	Uberlândia, Brazil	Ecuador	?–0	13–0	1995 South American Women's Football Championship
2.	8 January 1995	Uberlândia, Brazil	Ecuador	?–0	13–0	1995 South American Women's Football Championship
3.	8 January 1995	Uberlândia, Brazil	Ecuador	?–0	13–0	1995 South American Women's Football Championship
4.	8 January 1995	Uberlândia, Brazil	Ecuador	?–0	13–0	1995 South American Women's Football Championship
5.	14 January 1995	Uberlândia, Brazil	Argentina	4–0	8–0	1995 South American Women's Football Championship
6.	14 January 1995	Uberlândia, Brazil	Argentina	8–0	8–0	1995 South American Women's Football Championship
7.	7 June 1995	Karlstad, Sweden	Japan	1–0	1–2	1995 FIFA Women's World Cup
8.	21 July 1996	Washington, D.C., United States	Norway	1–1	2–2	1996 Summer Olympics
9.	21 July 1996	Washington, D.C., United States	Norway	2–2	2–2	1996 Summer Olympics
10.	23 July 1996	Birmingham, United States	Japan	2–0	2–0	1996 Summer Olympics
11.	28 July 1996	Athens, United States	China	2–1	2–3	1996 Summer Olympics
12.	6 March 1998	Mar del Plata, Argentina	Venezuela	?–0	14–0	1998 South American Women's Football Championship
13.	15 March 1998	Mar del Plata, Argentina	Argentina	4–0	7–1	1998 South American Women's Football Championship
14.	15 September 1998	Oneonta, United States	Russia	1–?	2–2	1998 Women's U.S. Cup
15.	15 September 1998	Oneonta, United States	Russia	2–?	2–2	1998 Women's U.S. Cup
16.	18 September 1998	Rochester, United States	Mexico	?–0	11–0	1998 Women's U.S. Cup
17.	18 September 1998	Rochester, United States	Mexico	?–0	11–0	1998 Women's U.S. Cup
18.	18 September 1998	Rochester, United States	Mexico	?–0	11–0	1998 Women's U.S. Cup
19.	18 September 1998	Rochester, United States	Mexico	?–0	11–0	1998 Women's U.S. Cup
20.	19 June 1999	East Rutherford, United States	Mexico	1–0	7–1	1999 FIFA Women's World Cup
21.	19 June 1999	East Rutherford, United States	Mexico	2–1	7–1	1999 FIFA Women's World Cup
22.	19 June 1999	East Rutherford, United States	Mexico	7–1	7–1	1999 FIFA Women's World Cup
23.	13 September 2000	Melbourne, Australia	Sweden	1–0	2–0	2000 Summer Olympics
24.	23 April 2003	Lima, Peru	Argentina	2–0	3–2	2003 South American Women's Football Championship
25.	25 April 2003	Lima, Peru	Peru	2–0	3–0	2003 South American Women's Football Championship
26.	27 April 2003	Lima, Peru	Colombia	1–0	12–0	2003 South American Women's Football Championship
27.	27 April 2003	Lima, Peru	Colombia	2–0	12–0	2003 South American Women's Football Championship
28.	17 August 2004	Patras, Greece	Greece	1–0	7–0	2004 Summer Olympics
29.	23 August 2004	Patras, Greece	Sweden	1–0	1–0	2004 Summer Olympics
30.	26 August 2004	Piraeus, Greece	United States	1–1	1–2 (a.e.t.)	2004 Summer Olympics
31.	18 July 2007	Rio de Janeiro, Brazil	Ecuador	8–0	10–0	2007 Pan American Games
32.	20 September 2007	Hangzhou, China	Denmark	1–0	1–0	2007 FIFA Women's World Cup

== Coaching career ==
In February 2022 Pretinha became an assistant coach at her former club Vasco da Gama.
