= Sissi (footballer) =

Brazilian footballer and coach (born 1967)

- Sissi at the 2000 Summer Olympics

Personal information
- Full name: Sisleide do Amor Lima
- Date of birth: 2 June 1967 (age 59)
- Place of birth: Esplanada, Bahia, Brazil
- Height: 5 ft 5 in (1.65 m)
- Position: Attacking midfielder

Senior career*
Years	Team	Apps	(Gls)
1996	Saad		
1997–1998	São Paulo		
1999–2000	Palmeiras		
2000	Vasco da Gama		
2001–2003	San Jose CyberRays	62	(5)
2004–2008	California Storm		
2009	FC Gold Pride	3	(0)

International career^{‡}
1988–2000	Brazil	47	(33)
- * Club domestic league appearances and goals as of 23:10, 30 September 2009 (UTC) ‡ National team caps and goals as of 23:10, 30 September 2009 (UTC)

Sisleide do Amor Lima (born 2 June 1967), commonly known as Sissi, is a former Brazilian footballer and current coach who played as an attacking midfielder. She last played for FC Gold Pride of Women's Professional Soccer and is a former member of the Brazil women's national football team.

== Early life ==
Born in Esplanada, Brazil, Sissi began playing football at the age of six with her older brother Paulo and her father. At the age of 14, she left her home in Esplanada to play professionally in Salvador, Brazil. She played for the first time with the Brazilian national team at age 16. In 1999 she transferred from São Paulo FC to Palmeiras for a US$5,000 fee.

== Club career ==
=== San Jose CyberRays (2001-2003) ===
Sissi played for the San Jose CyberRays in the first women's professional soccer league in the United States, the Women's United Soccer Association (WUSA) all three years that the league was in existence. The team won the Founders Cup Championship in their first year together.

=== California Storm (2004-2014) ===
In 2004, Sissi signed to play with the California Storm in the Women's Premier Soccer League, the highest women's professional soccer league in the United States after the WUSA ceased operations. She joined fellow 1999 Women's World Cup stars, Brandi Chastain and Keri Sanchez.

=== Saad Esporte Club (2005) ===
In November 2005, Sissi made a brief return to one of her former clubs in Brazil, Saad Esporte Clube.

=== FC Gold Pride (2009) ===
Sissi signed with FC Gold Pride for the inaugural season of Women's Professional Soccer (WPS) as the team's assistant coach. On 11 June 2009, it was announced that Sissi was joining the roster of the team, making her the oldest player in the league at age 42. She made three appearances as a player for the club playing a total of 128 minutes. She was also an assistant coach.

== International career ==
Sissi was part of the EC Radar club team who represented Brazil at the 1988 FIFA Women's Invitation Tournament in Guangdong and finished in third place. She was unable to take part in the inaugural 1991 FIFA Women's World Cup because she was not released by her club team.

Sissi was called up to Brazil's squad for the 1999 FIFA Women's World Cup as a Palmeiras player. She won the golden boot award at the tournament in which she scored seven goals, sharing the award with China's Sun Wen.

For the 2003 FIFA Women's World Cup 36-year-old Sissi was left out of the Brazil squad due to her relatively advanced age and "disciplinary issues".

== International goals ==
No.	Date	Venue	Opponent	Score	Result	Competition
1.	25 July 1996	Birmingham, United States	Germany	1–1	1–1	1996 Summer Olympics
2.	19 June 1999	East Rutherford, United States	Mexico	3–1	7–1	1999 FIFA Women's World Cup
3.	19 June 1999	East Rutherford, United States	Mexico	5–1	7–1	1999 FIFA Women's World Cup
4.	19 June 1999	East Rutherford, United States	Mexico	6–1	7–1	1999 FIFA Women's World Cup
5.	24 June 1999	Chicago, United States	Italy	1–0	2–0	1999 FIFA Women's World Cup
6.	24 June 1999	Chicago, United States	Italy	2–0	2–0	1999 FIFA Women's World Cup
7.	27 June 1999	Landover, United States	Germany	2–1	3–3	1999 FIFA Women's World Cup
8.	1 July 1999	Landover, United States	Nigeria	4–3	4–3 (a.e.t.)	1999 FIFA Women's World Cup

== Coaching career ==
On 29 September 2008, Sissi was announced as the new assistant coach for the Bay Area Women's Professional Soccer team, ultimately known as FC Gold Pride. She was also the head coach for the Las Positas College Women's Soccer team based in Livermore, California. She was a coach for the Diablo Valley Soccer Club (DVSC) for three years as well as Clayton Valley High School. She currently coaches at Walnut Creek Soccer Club and at Solano Community College in Fairfield, California.

== Honours ==
Saad

- Campeonato Brasileiro: 1996

São Paulo

- Campeonato Brasileiro: 1997
- Campeonato Paulista de Futebol Feminino: 1997

Palmeiras

- Campeonato Brasileiro runner-up: 1999-2000
- Campeonato Paulista de Futebol Feminino runner-up: 2000

Vasco da Gama

- Campeonato Carioca de Futebol Feminino: 2000
- Torneio Internacional de futebol feminino: 2000
- Torneio Inicio do Rio Janeiro: 2000

CyberRays

- Founders Cup: 2001

California Storm

- Women's Premier Soccer League: 2004

Brazil

- Copa América Femenina: 1995, 1998
- FIFA Women's World Cup third-Place: 1999
