= Canada women's national soccer team results =

The following is a list of all results of the Canada women's national soccer team.

Win Draw Loss

Scorers list only the Canadian scorers.

== 1986–1988 ==
Canada Women's National Team 1986 Results (1W-0D-1L)
| Date | Tournament | Location | Opponent | Score | Scorers |
|---|---|---|---|---|---|
| July 7, 1986 | North American Cup | Blaine, United States | United States | 0–2 | |
| July 9, 1986 | North American Cup | Blaine, United States | United States | 2–1 | Donnelly 6', 45' |

Canada Women's National Team 1987 Results (1W-1D-6L)
| Date | Tournament | Location | Opponent | Score | Scorers |
|---|---|---|---|---|---|
| July 5, 1987 | North American Cup | Blaine, United States | Sweden | 0–2 | |
| July 7, 1987 | North American Cup | Blaine, United States | United States | 2–4 | Cant, Caron |
| December 11, 1987 | Chinese Cup 1987 | Kaohsiung, Chinese Taipei | Hong Kong | 2–0 | Houchen 24', 44' |
| December 12, 1987 | Chinese Cup 1987 | Kaohsiung, Chinese Taipei | Australia | 0–2 | |
| December 16, 1987 | Chinese Cup 1987 | Taipei, Chinese Taipei | Chinese Taipei | 0–2 | |
| December 17, 1987 | Chinese Cup 1987 | Taipei, Chinese Taipei | Australia | 0–0 | |
| December 19, 1987 | Chinese Cup 1987 | Taipei, Chinese Taipei | United States | 0–4 | |
| December 20, 1987 | Chinese Cup 1987 | Taipei, Chinese Taipei | New Zealand | 0–1 | |

Canada Women's National Team 1988 Results (1W-1D-2L)
| Date | Tournament | Location | Opponent | Score | Scorers |
|---|---|---|---|---|---|
| June 1, 1988 | 1988 FIFA Women's Invitation Tournament | Guangzhou, China PR | China | 0–2 | |
| June 3, 1988 | 1988 FIFA Women's Invitation Tournament | Fu-Shan, China PR | Ivory Coast | 6–0 | Caron 12', 24', Gareau 25', Ross 35', McEachern 60', Cant 70' |
| June 5, 1988 | 1988 FIFA Women's Invitation Tournament | Guangzhou, China PR | Netherlands | 1–1 | Ross 71' |
| June 8, 1988 | 1988 FIFA Women's Invitation Tournament | Guangzhou, China PR | Sweden | 0–1 | |

== 1990–1999 ==
Canada Women's National Team 1990 Results (1W-1D-3L)
| Date | Tournament | Location | Opponent | Score | Scorers |
|---|---|---|---|---|---|
| April 16, 1990 | 1990 Varna International women's tournament | Varna, Bulgaria | Soviet Union | 1–1 | Cant |
| April 20, 1990 | 1990 Varna International women's tournament | Varna, Bulgaria | China | 0–2 | |
| April 21, 1990 | 1990 Varna International women's tournament | Varna, Bulgaria | Soviet Union | 5–0 | Kelly, Ross, Donnelly |
| July 23, 1990 | International Women's Invitational | Winnipeg, Manitoba | Norway | 0–2 | |
| July 27, 1990 | International Women's Invitational | Winnipeg, Manitoba | United States | 1–4 | Serwetnyk 72' |

Canada Women's National Team 1991 Results (4W-0D-1L)
| Date | Tournament | Location | Opponent | Score | Scorers |
|---|---|---|---|---|---|
| April 16, 1991 | 1991 CONCACAF Women's Championship | Port-au-Prince, Haiti | Costa Rica | 6–0 | McEachern 15', Hooper 22', 48', Vamos 29', Gareau 59', Caron 70' |
| April 19, 1991 | 1991 CONCACAF Women's Championship | Port-au-Prince, Haiti | Jamaica | 9–0 | Gareau 5', 24', 75', Hooper 13', 28', 59', 63', ? 46' (o.g.), Vamos 66' |
| April 21, 1991 | 1991 CONCACAF Women's Championship | Port-au-Prince, Haiti | Haiti | 2–0 | Hooper 20', Vamos 57' |
| April 24, 1991 | 1991 CONCACAF Women's Championship | Port-au-Prince, Haiti | Trinidad and Tobago | 6–0 | Caron 41', 54', 55', Vamos 51', 79', Cant 70' |
| April 28, 1991 | 1991 CONCACAF Women's Championship | Port-au-Prince, Haiti | United States | 0–5 | |

Canada Women's National Team 1993 Results (1W-1D-4L)
| Date | Tournament | Location | Opponent | Score | Scorers |
|---|---|---|---|---|---|
| June 10, 1993 | Ohio Soccer Extravagenza | Columbus, United States | Italy | 0–4 | |
| June 14, 1993 | Ohio Soccer Extravagenza | Cincinnati, United States | United States | 0–7 | |
| June 21, 1993 | Friendly | Detroit, United States | United States | 0–3 | |
| August 4, 1993 | 1993 CONCACAF Women's Championship | Long Island, United States | Trinidad and Tobago | 4–0 | Burtini 20', Vamos 40', 50', Hooper 79' |
| August 6, 1993 | 1993 CONCACAF Women's Championship | Long Island, United States | New Zealand | 0–0 | |
| August 8, 1993 | 1993 CONCACAF Women's Championship | Long Island, United States | United States | 0–1 | |

Canada Women's National Team 1994 Results (4W-0D-7L)
| Date | Tournament | Location | Opponent | Score | Scorers |
|---|---|---|---|---|---|
| April 12, 1994 | Friendly | Milford, Trinidad and Tobago | Trinidad and Tobago | 2–0 | Burtini 59', Hooper 90' |
| April 14, 1994 | Friendly | San Fernando, Trinidad and Tobago | United States | 1–4 | Hooper 82' |
| April 17, 1994 | Friendly | Port of Spain, Trinidad and Tobago | United States | 0–3 | |
| July 25, 1994 | Friendly | Ottawa, Ontario | China | 1–4 | O'Brien 4' |
| July 27, 1994 | Friendly | Montreal, Quebec | Germany | 1–2 | Hooper 5' |
| August 3, 1994 | Friendly | Ottawa, Ontario | Sweden | 0–3 | |
| August 5, 1994 | Friendly | Montreal, Quebec | Sweden | 1–2 | Hooper 47' |
| August 13, 1994 | 1994 CONCACAF Women's Championship | Montreal, Quebec | Jamaica | 7–0 | Hooper 2', 67', 78', Burtini 26', 28', Donnelly 65', Neil 87' |
| August 15, 1994 | 1994 CONCACAF Women's Championship | Montreal, Quebec | Mexico | 6–0 | Burtini 19', 27', 44', 60', 75', Hooper 33' |
| August 19, 1994 | 1994 CONCACAF Women's Championship | Montreal, Quebec | Trinidad and Tobago | 5–0 | Ring 41', Burtini 70', Neil 75', Hooper 77', 90' |
| August 21, 1994 | 1994 CONCACAF Women's Championship | Montreal, Quebec | United States | 0–6 | |

Canada Women's National Team 1995 Results (1W-2D-9L)
| Date | Tournament | Location | Opponent | Score | Scorers |
|---|---|---|---|---|---|
| April 11, 1995 | Tournoi Paris | Poissy, France | France | 0–1 | |
| April 12, 1995 | Tournoi Paris | St-Maur, France | United States | 0–5 | |
| April 14, 1995 | Tournoi Paris | Montpellier, France | Italy | 1–1 | Hooper 67' |
| May 5, 1995 | Friendly | Tokyo, Japan | Japan | 0–1 | |
| May 11, 1995 | Friendly | Burnaby, British Columbia | Australia | 3–0 | Ring 4', Hooper 53', 88' |
| May 11, 1995 | Friendly | Burnaby, British Columbia | Australia | 0–3 | |
| May 19, 1995 | Friendly | Dallas, United States | United States | 1–9 | Caron 41' |
| May 22, 1995 | Friendly | Edmonton, Alberta | United States | 1–2 | Hooper 44' |
| May 29, 1995 | Friendly | København, Denmark | Denmark | 0–5 | |
| June 6, 1995 | 1995 FIFA Women's World Cup | Helsingborg, Sweden | England | 2–3 | Stoumbos 87', Donnelly 90+1' |
| June 8, 1995 | 1995 FIFA Women's World Cup | Helsingborg, Sweden | Nigeria | 3–3 | Burtini 12', 55', Donnelly 20' |
| June 10, 1995 | 1995 FIFA Women's World Cup | Gävle, Sweden | Norway | 0–7 | |

Canada Women's National Team 1996 Results (0W-1D-4L)
| Date | Tournament | Location | Opponent | Score | Scorers |
|---|---|---|---|---|---|
| May 12, 1996 | US Cup '96 | Worcester, United States | United States | 0–6 | |
| May 15, 1996 | US Cup '96 | New Britain, United States | China | 0–5 | |
| May 18, 1996 | US Cup '96 | Washington, United States | Japan | 0–0 | |
| July 4, 1996 | Friendly | San Diego, United States | Brazil | 1–2 | Helland 35' |
| July 7, 1996 | Friendly | Ottawa, Ontario | Denmark | 0–2 | |

Canada Women's National Team 1997 Results (0W-0D-3L)
| Date | Tournament | Location | Opponent | Score | Scorers |
|---|---|---|---|---|---|
| May 31, 1997 | US Cup '97 | New Britain, United States | United States | 0–4 | |
| June 4, 1997 | US Cup '97 | Worcester, United States | Italy | 1–2 | Morneau 20' |
| June 7, 1997 | US Cup '97 | Oakford, United States | Australia | 2–3 | O'Neil 10', Burtini 82' |

Canada Women's National Team 1998 Results (5W-0D-3L)
| Date | Tournament | Location | Opponent | Score | Scorers |
|---|---|---|---|---|---|
| July 19, 1998 | Friendly | Ottawa, Ontario | China | 1–2 | Rosenow 24' |
| July 21, 1998 | Friendly | Montreal, Quebec | China | 0–4 | |
| August 2, 1998 | Friendly | Orlando, United States | United States | 0–4 | |
| August 28, 1998 | 1998 CONCACAF Women's Championship | Etobicoke, Ontario | Puerto Rico | 21–0 | Burtini 2', 7', 9', 15', 24', 26', 40', 43', Rosenow 12', 69', 70', 80', Franck 18', 62', Hooper 21', 38', Morneau 36', 44', Blaskovic 64', 73', Muir 75' |
| August 30, 1998 | 1998 CONCACAF Women's Championship | Etobicoke, Ontario | Martinique | 14–0 | Burtini 3', 13', 26', Hooper 21', Muir 28', Rosenow 30', 38', 44', 55', Morneau 65', Blaskovic 72', 77', Harvey 81', Hiebert 85' |
| September 1, 1998 | 1998 CONCACAF Women's Championship | Etobicoke, Ontario | Guatemala | 4–0 | Hooper 2', Burtini 23', 26', 53' |
| September 4, 1998 | 1998 CONCACAF Women's Championship | Etobicoke, Ontario | Costa Rica | 2–0 | Hooper 19', 39' |
| September 6, 1998 | 1998 CONCACAF Women's Championship | Etobicoke, Ontario | Mexico | 1–0 | Hiebert 42' |

Canada Women's National Team 1999 Results (3W-1D-7L)
| Date | Tournament | Location | Opponent | Score | Scorers |
|---|---|---|---|---|---|
| January 6, 1999 | Australia Cup | Canberra, Australia | Italy | 0–1 | |
| January 10, 1999 | Australia Cup | Canberra, Australia | Australia | 3–4 | Donnelly 30', Hooper 50', 75' |
| May 21, 1999 | Friendly | Vancouver, British Columbia | Mexico | 3–0 | Rosenow 35', 52', Burtini 45' |
| May 24, 1999 | Friendly | Vancouver, British Columbia | Mexico | 2–0 | Hooper 8', Joly 44' |
| June 3, 1999 | Friendly | Portland, United States | Brazil | 2–4 | Hooper, ? |
| June 6, 1999 | Friendly | Portland, United States | United States | 2–4 | Hooper 7', 44' |
| June 9, 1999 | Friendly | Etobicoke, Ontario | Australia | 1–3 | Isabelle Harvey 24' |
| June 12, 1999 | Friendly | Toronto, Ontario | Australia | 2–0 | Hooper 47', Neil 55' |
| June 19, 1999 | 1999 FIFA Women's World Cup | San Jose, United States | Japan | 1–1 | Burtini 32' |
| June 23, 1999 | 1999 FIFA Women's World Cup | Washington, United States | Norway | 1–7 | Hooper 31' |
| June 26, 1999 | 1999 FIFA Women's World Cup | New York, United States | Russia | 1–4 | Hooper 76' |

== 2000–2009 ==
Canada Women's National Team 2000 Results (9W-2D-7L)
| Date | Tournament | Location | Opponent | Score | Scorers |
|---|---|---|---|---|---|
| March 12, 2000 | 2000 Algarve Cup | Lagoa, Portugal | China | 0–4 | |
| March 14, 2000 | 2000 Algarve Cup | Albufeira, Portugal | Norway | 1–2 | Sinclair 8' |
| March 16, 2000 | 2000 Algarve Cup | Albufeira, Portugal | Finland | 2–1 | Harvey 32', Walsh 89' |
| March 18, 2000 | 2000 Algarve Cup | Lagoa, Portugal | Denmark | 3–2 | Sinclair 2', 55', Boyd 26' |
| May 5, 2000 | Nike Cup | Portland, United States | South Korea | 1–0 | Neil 71' |
| May 7, 2000 | Nike Cup | Portland, United States | United States | 0–4 | |
| May 31, 2000 | Pacific Cup | Canberra, Australia | New Zealand | 2–1 | Kiss 84', Sinclair 90+2' |
| June 2, 2000 | Pacific Cup | Sydney, Australia | United States | 1–9 | Sinclair 82' |
| June 4, 2000 | Pacific Cup | Campbelltown, Australia | Australia | 2–0 | Sinclair 27', Burtini 43' |
| June 8, 2000 | Pacific Cup | Newcastle, Australia | China | 2–2 | Sinclair 2', 19' |
| June 10, 2000 | Pacific Cup | Newcastle, Australia | Japan | 5–1 | Sinclair 3', Burtini 27', 33', Latham 34', Neil 84' |
| June 24, 2000 | 2000 CONCACAF Women's Gold Cup | Foxborough, United States | Mexico | 4–3 | Sinclair 49', 76', Walsh 71', Hooper 87' |
| June 26, 2000 | 2000 CONCACAF Women's Gold Cup | Hershey, United States | China | 2–3 | Hooper 31', 50' |
| June 28, 2000 | 2000 CONCACAF Women's Gold Cup | Louisville, United States | Guatemala | 12–0 | Sinclair 9', 73', 76', Latham 13', 55', 81', Neil 27', Franck 39', Walsh 61', Hooper 71', 76', Kiss 84' |
| July 1, 2000 | 2000 CONCACAF Women's Gold Cup | Louisville, United States | United States | 1–4 | Hooper 58' |
| July 3, 2000 | 2000 CONCACAF Women's Gold Cup | Foxborough, United States | China | 1–2 | Hooper 59' |
| August 20, 2000 | Friendly | Kansas City, United States | United States | 1–1 | Walsh 76' |
| November 11, 2000 | Friendly | Columbus, United States | United States | 3–1 | Sinclair 19', Hooper 21', Burtini 82' |

Canada Women's National Team 2001 Results (3W-1D-8L)
| Date | Tournament | Location | Opponent | Score | Scorers |
|---|---|---|---|---|---|
| February 10, 2001 | Friendly | Rabat, Morocco | Morocco | 4–0 | Burtini 52', Sinclair 56', Kiss 58', 63' |
| February 12, 2001 | Friendly | Rabat, Morocco | Morocco | 0–1 | |
| March 11, 2001 | 2001 Algarve Cup | Lagos, Portugal | United States | 3–0 | Hooper 31', 90+1', Sinclair 37' |
| March 13, 2001 | 2001 Algarve Cup | Silves, Portugal | Sweden | 2–5 | Sinclair 36', 73' |
| March 15, 2001 | 2001 Algarve Cup | Albufeira, Portugal | Portugal | 2–1 | ? 8', Boyd 89' |
| March 17, 2001 | 2001 Algarve Cup | Faro, Portugal | China | 1–5 | Sinclair 21' |
| June 10, 2001 | Friendly | Linköping, Sweden | Sweden | 2–5 | Kiss 37', Latham 42' |
| June 14, 2001 | Friendly | Goch, Germany | Germany | 0–3 | |
| June 17, 2001 | Friendly | Oberhausen, Germany | Germany | 2–6 | Rozwadowska 80', M Müller 90' |
| June 19, 2001 | Friendly | Hønefoss, Norway | Norway | 1–9 | Hooper 54' |
| June 30, 2001 | Friendly | Toronto, Ontario | United States | 2–2 | Hooper 15', Sinclair 58' |
| July 3, 2001 | Friendly | Blaine, United States | United States | 0–1 | |

Canada Women's National Team 2002 Results (9W-2D-4L)
| Date | Tournament | Location | Opponent | Score | Scorers |
|---|---|---|---|---|---|
| March 1, 2002 | 2002 Algarve Cup | Quarteira, Portugal | Scotland | 3–0 | Neil 18', 24', 31' |
| March 3, 2002 | 2002 Algarve Cup | Lagoa, Portugal | Wales | 4–0 | Sinclair 28', 69', Lang 63', 89' |
| March 5, 2002 | 2002 Algarve Cup | Silves, Portugal | Portugal | 7–1 | Allen 2', Hermus 15', Sinclair 29', 85', Lang 48', 81', Smith 70' |
| March 7, 2002 | 2002 Algarve Cup | Lagoa, Portugal | Finland | 0–3 | |
| April 3, 2002 | Tournoi Féminine | Poitiers, France | Australia | 0–0 | |
| April 6, 2002 | Tournoi Féminine | Angoulême, France | France | 2–0 | Lang 11', Neil 30' |
| April 9, 2002 | Tournoi Féminine | Limoges, France | Japan | 2–3 | Lang 62', Allen 88' |
| July 17, 2002 | Friendly | Etobicoke, Ontario | Norway | 2–2 | Neil 9', Hooper 66' |
| September 26, 2002 | Friendly | Burnaby, British Columbia | Australia | 2–0 | Morneau 62', 84' |
| September 28, 2002 | Friendly | Victoria, British Columbia | Australia | 0–1 | |
| October 30, 2002 | 2002 CONCACAF Women's Gold Cup | Victoria, British Columbia | Haiti | 11–1 | Hooper 5', 26', 32', Burtini 11', 84', Sinclair 16', 43', 71', 86', Chapman 30', ? 79' (o.g.) |
| November 1, 2002 | 2002 CONCACAF Women's Gold Cup | Victoria, British Columbia | Jamaica | 9–0 | Sinclair 14', 77', Hooper 20', Walsh 42', Lang 44', 62', 84', 91', Hermus 56' |
| November 3, 2002 | 2002 CONCACAF Women's Gold Cup | Victoria, British Columbia | Costa Rica | 3–0 | Hooper 28', 42', Sinclair 49' |
| November 6, 2002 | 2002 CONCACAF Women's Gold Cup | Seattle, United States | Mexico | 2–0 | ? 10' (o.g.), ? 71' (o.g.) |
| November 9, 2002 | 2002 CONCACAF Women's Gold Cup | Pasadena, United States | United States | 1–2 | Hooper 45+' |

Canada Women's National Team 2003 Results (13W-3D-5L)
| Date | Tournament | Location | Opponent | Score | Scorers |
|---|---|---|---|---|---|
| March 14, 2003 | 2002 Algarve Cup | Olhão, Portugal | United States | 1–1 | Neil 7' |
| March 16, 2003 | 2003 Algarve Cup | Ferreiras, Portugal | Sweden | 1–1 | Nonen 80' |
| March 18, 2003 | 2003 Algarve Cup | Vila Real de Santo António, Portugal | Norway | 0–1 | |
| March 20, 2003 | 2003 Algarve Cup | Vila Real de Santo António, Portugal | Greece | 7–1 | Sinclair 5', 38', 82', Neil 26', Lang 41', Burtini 65', Moscato 80' |
| April 26, 2003 | Friendly | Washington, United States | United States | 1–6 | Sinclair 7' |
| May 19, 2003 | Friendly | Lachine, Quebec | England | 4–0 | Neil 20', 36', Lang 66', 72' |
| May 22, 2003 | Friendly | Ottawa, Ontario | England | 4–0 | Neil 8', 21', Latham 17', Lang 78' |
| June 12, 2003 | Friendly | Guasave, Mexico | Mexico | 4–0 | Sinclair 58', Latham 74', ? 80' (o.g.), Allen 90' |
| June 15, 2003 | Friendly | Mazatlán, Mexico | Mexico | 3–0 | ? 54', Sinclair 54', Matheson 90' |
| July 17, 2003 | Friendly | Montreal, Quebec | Brazil | 2–1 | Wilkinson 67', Hermus 88' |
| July 20, 2003 | Friendly | Ottawa, Ontario | Brazil | 2–1 | Lang 41', Hermus 56' |
| August 16, 2003 | Friendly | Seattle, United States | Ghana | 1–1 | Sinclair 7' |
| August 31, 2003 | Friendly | Edmonton, Alberta | Mexico | 8–0 | Lang 4', Neil 29', Latham 41', 54', Sinclair 50', Hooper 60', ? 67' (o.g.), Andrews 75' |
| September 9, 2003 | Friendly | Burnaby, British Columbia | Mexico | 6–0 | Lang 7', 31', 59', Andrews 57', Wilkinson 61', Rustad 85' |
| September 14, 2003 | Friendly | Kingston, Ontario | Australia | 2–0 | Hooper 72', Wilkinson 73' |
| September 20, 2003 | 2003 FIFA Women's World Cup | Columbus, United States | Germany | 1–4 | Sinclair 4' |
| September 24, 2003 | 2003 FIFA Women's World Cup | Columbus, United States | Argentina | 3–0 | Hooper 19', Latham 79', 82' |
| September 27, 2003 | 2003 FIFA Women's World Cup | Foxborough, United States | Japan | 3–1 | Latham 36', Sinclair 49', Lang 72' |
| October 2, 2003 | 2003 FIFA Women's World Cup | Portland, United States | China | 1–0 | Hooper 8' |
| October 5, 2003 | 2003 FIFA Women's World Cup | Portland, United States | Sweden | 1–2 | Lang 64' |
| October 11, 2003 | 2003 FIFA Women's World Cup | Carson, United States | United States | 1–3 | Sinclair 38' |

Canada Women's National Team 2004 Results (4W-0D-6L)
| Date | Tournament | Location | Opponent | Score | Scorers |
|---|---|---|---|---|---|
| January 30, 2004 | 2004 Four Nations Tournament | Shenzhen, China PR | China | 1–2 | Maranda 87' |
| February 1, 2004 | 2004 Four Nations Tournament | Shenzhen, China PR | Sweden | 1–3 | Sinclair 76' |
| February 3, 2004 | 2004 Four Nations Tournament | Shenzhen, China PR | United States | 0–2 | |
| February 26, 2004 | 2004 CONCACAF Women's Olympic Qualifying Tournament | Heredia, Costa Rica | Jamaica | 6–0 | Latham 33', Hooper 42', Sinclair 46', 61', 90+', Moscato 82' |
| February 28, 2004 | 2004 CONCACAF Women's Olympic Qualifying Tournament | Heredia, Costa Rica | Panama | 6–0 | Latham 14', Jamani 20', 50', 66', 75', Neil 25' |
| March 1, 2004 | 2004 CONCACAF Women's Olympic Qualifying Tournament | Heredia, Costa Rica | Costa Rica | 2–1 | Latham 7', Jamani 21', Cruz 60' |
| March 3, 2004 | 2004 CONCACAF Women's Olympic Qualifying Tournament | San José, Costa Rica | Mexico | 1–2 | Jamani 84' |
| March 5, 2004 | 2004 CONCACAF Women's Olympic Qualifying Tournament | Heredia, Costa Rica | Costa Rica | 4–0 | Sinclair 20', 78', Jamani 58', Hooper 43' |
| July 3, 2004 | Friendly | Nashville, United States | United States | 0–1 | |
| July 30, 2004 | Friendly | Tokyo, Japan | Japan | 0–3 | |

Canada Women's National Team 2005 Results (2W-1D-7L)
| Date | Tournament | Location | Opponent | Score | Scorers |
|---|---|---|---|---|---|
| April 19, 2005 | Friendly | Apeldoorn, Netherlands | Netherlands | 1–1 | Neil 81' |
| April 21, 2005 | Friendly | Osnabrück, Germany | Germany | 1–3 | Allen 14' |
| April 24, 2005 | Friendly | Hildesheim, Germany | Germany | 2–3 | Hermus 32', Sinclair 90' |
| April 27, 2005 | Friendly | Bischheim, France | France | 2–0 | Schmidt 75', Neil 88' |
| May 25, 2005 | Friendly | København, Denmark | Denmark | 4–3 | Sinclair 22', 83', Andrews 55', Hooper 76' |
| May 28, 2005 | Friendly | Stockholm, Sweden | Sweden | 1–3 | Sinclair 69' |
| May 31, 2005 | Friendly | Sarpsborg, Norway | Norway | 0–3 | |
| June 26, 2005 | Friendly | Virginia Beach, United States | United States | 0–2 | |
| September 1, 2005 | Friendly | Burnaby, British Columbia | Germany | 1–3 | Lang 70' |
| September 4, 2005 | Friendly | Edmonton, Alberta | Germany | 3–4 | Hooper 17', Lang 19', Franko 86' |

Canada Women's National Team 2006 Results (11W-4D-2L)
| Date | Tournament | Location | Opponent | Score | Scorers |
|---|---|---|---|---|---|
| February 23, 2006 | Friendly | Mexicali, Mexico | Mexico | 3–1 | Sinclair 32', 44', Hooper 42' |
| February 25, 2006 | Friendly | Palm Springs, United States | Mexico | 1–1 | Franko 66' |
| March 1, 2006 | Friendly | Vancouver, British Columbia | Netherlands | 1–0 | Neil 85' |
| March 4, 2006 | Friendly | Victoria, British Columbia | Netherlands | 3–1 | Hooper 4', 10', Schmidt 71' |
| June 25, 2006 | Friendly | Etobicoke, Ontario | Italy | 2–1 | ? 1' (o.g.), Hooper 2' |
| July 18, 2006 | Friendly | Blaine, United States | Sweden | 4–2 | Hooper 16', 20', 59', Sinclair 58' |
| July 30, 2006 | Friendly | Cary, North Carolina, United States | United States | 0–2 | |
| August 19, 2006 | Friendly | St. John's, Newfoundland and Labrador | China | 0–0 | |
| August 22, 2006 | Friendly | St. John's, Newfoundland and Labrador | China | 1–1 | Hermus 25' |
| August 26, 2006 | Friendly | Rouen, France | France | 1–0 | Sinclair 43' |
| August 29, 2006 | Friendly | Saint-Aubin-sur-Scie, France | France | 2–2 | Sinclair 59', Franko 65' |
| October 28, 2006 | Peace Queen Cup | Seoul, South Korea | Italy | 3–2 | Sinclair 16', 34', Robinson 80' |
| October 30, 2006 | Peace Queen Cup | Masan, South Korea | South Korea | 3–1 | Sinclair 23', 49', 69' |
| November 1, 2006 | Peace Queen Cup | Changwon, South Korea | Brazil | 4–2 | Franko 1', Hermus 7', Sinclair 28', Wilkinson 33' |
| November 4, 2006 | Peace Queen Cup | Seoul, South Korea | United States | 0–1 | |
| November 22, 2006 | 2006 CONCACAF Women's Gold Cup | Carson, United States | Jamaica | 4–0 | Sinclair 40', 71', Wilkinson 51', Booth 88' |
| November 26, 2006 | 2006 CONCACAF Women's Gold Cup | Carson, United States | United States | 1–2 | Hermus 45+' |

Canada Women's National Team 2007 Results (7W-2D-6L)
| Date | Tournament | Location | Opponent | Score | Scorers |
|---|---|---|---|---|---|
| May 3, 2007 | Friendly | Nanjing, China PR | China | 1–3 | Sinclair 9' |
| May 6, 2007 | Friendly | Nanjing, China PR | China | 1–3 | Matheson 30' |
| May 12, 2007 | Friendly | Frisco, United States | United States | 2–6 | Wilkinson 11', Sinclair 50' |
| June 3, 2007 | Friendly | Auckland, New Zealand | New Zealand | 3–0 | Sinclair 13', 63', Chapman 42' |
| June 6, 2007 | Friendly | Auckland, New Zealand | New Zealand | 5–0 | Chapman 4', Sinclair 12', Allen 20', 76', Robinson 21' |
| July 14, 2007 | 2007 Pan American Games | Rio de Janeiro, Brazil | Uruguay | 7–0 | Sinclair 7', 70', 84', Hermus 38', 89', Matheson 53', Tancredi 80' |
| July 16, 2007 | 2007 Pan American Games | Rio de Janeiro, Brazil | Ecuador | 4–0 | Neil 13', Lang 24', 30', 50' |
| July 18, 2007 | 2007 Pan American Games | Rio de Janeiro, Brazil | Jamaica | 11–1 | Sinclair 17', 24', 39', 45+1', Kiss 32', Wilkinson 41', Vermeulen 42', Lang 49', Thorlakson 63', 84', Neil 73' |
| July 20, 2007 | 2007 Pan American Games | Rio de Janeiro, Brazil | Brazil | 0–7 | |
| July 23, 2007 | 2007 Pan American Games | Rio de Janeiro, Brazil | United States | 1–2 | Lang 88' |
| July 26, 2007 | 2007 Pan American Games | Rio de Janeiro, Brazil | Mexico | 2–1 | Sinclair 21', Kiss 45+2' |
| August 30, 2007 | Friendly | Kingston, Jamaica | Japan | 0–0 | |
| September 12, 2007 | 2007 FIFA Women's World Cup | Hangzhou, China PR | Norway | 1–2 | Chapman 33' |
| September 15, 2007 | 2007 FIFA Women's World Cup | Hangzhou, China PR | Ghana | 4–0 | Sinclair 16', 62', Schmidt 55', Franko 77' |
| September 20, 2007 | 2007 FIFA Women's World Cup | Chengdu, China PR | Australia | 2–2 | Tancredi 1', Sinclair 85' |

Canada Women's National Team 2008 Results (9W-8D-7L)
| Date | Tournament | Location | Opponent | Score | Scorers |
|---|---|---|---|---|---|
| January 16, 2008 | 2008 Four Nations Tournament | Guangdong, China PR | United States | 0–4 | |
| January 18, 2008 | 2008 Four Nations Tournament | Guangdong, China PR | China | 0–0 | |
| January 20, 2008 | 2008 Four Nations Tournament | Guangdong, China PR | Finland | 1–1 | Robinson 90+3' |
| March 5, 2008 | 2008 Cyprus Cup | Paralimni, Cyprus | Russia | 2–1 | Armstrong 8', Lang 50' |
| March 7, 2008 | 2008 Cyprus Cup | Larnaca, Cyprus | Japan | 3–0 | Sinclair 22', 42', 80' |
| March 10, 2008 | 2008 Cyprus Cup | Larnaca, Cyprus | Scotland | 0–2 | |
| March 14, 2008 | Friendly | Bondoufle, France | France | 0–0 | |
| April 2, 2008 | 2008 CONCACAF Women's Olympic Qualifying Tournament | Juarez, Mexico | Trinidad and Tobago | 6–0 | Tancredi 10', Filigno 21', Lang 39', Hermus 61', Robinson 68', Sinclair 86' |
| April 6, 2008 | 2008 CONCACAF Women's Olympic Qualifying Tournament | Juarez, Mexico | Costa Rica | 1–0 | Tancredi 15' |
| April 9, 2008 | 2008 CONCACAF Women's Olympic Qualifying Tournament | Juarez, Mexico | Mexico | 1–0 | Tancredi 25' |
| April 12, 2008 | 2008 CONCACAF Women's Olympic Qualifying Tournament | Juarez, Mexico | United States | 1–1 | Tancredi 116' |
| May 10, 2008 | Friendly | Washington, United States | United States | 0–6 | |
| May 23, 2008 | Friendly | Sydney, Australia | Australia | 1–2 | Lang 55' |
| June 14, 2008 | 2008 Peace Queen Cup | Suwon, South Korea | Argentina | 5–0 | Matheson 25', Sinclair 46', 54', Tancredi 59', Timko 87' |
| June 16, 2008 | 2008 Peace Queen Cup | Suwon, South Korea | South Korea | 3–1 | Lang 36', Sinclair 47', 73' |
| June 18, 2008 | 2008 Peace Queen Cup | Suwon, South Korea | New Zealand | 2–0 | Sinclair 2', Lang 50' |
| June 21, 2008 | 2008 Peace Queen Cup | Suwon, South Korea | United States | 0–1 | |
| July 10, 2008 | Friendly | Toronto, Ontario | Brazil | 1–1 | Sinclair 53' |
| July 26, 2008 | Friendly | Singapore, Singapore | New Zealand | 1–1 | Sinclair 36' |
| July 27, 2008 | Friendly | Singapore, Singapore | Singapore | 8–0 | Hermus 4', Robinson 12', 17', Timko 33', 84', Rustad 57', 77', Kiss 73' |
| August 6, 2008 | 2008 Summer Olympics | Tianjin, China PR | Argentina | 2–1 | Chapman 27', Lang 72' |
| August 9, 2008 | 2008 Summer Olympics | Tianjin, China PR | China | 1–1 | Sinclair 35' |
| August 12, 2008 | 2008 Summer Olympics | Beijing, China PR | Sweden | 1–2 | Tancredi 63' |
| August 15, 2008 | 2008 Summer Olympics | Shanghai, China PR | United States | 1–2 | Sinclair 30' |

Canada Women's National Team 2009 Results (2W-1D-4L)
| Date | Tournament | Location | Opponent | Score | Scorers |
|---|---|---|---|---|---|
| March 5, 2009 | 2009 Cyprus Cup | Paralimni, Cyprus | New Zealand | 1–1 | Julien 11' |
| March 7, 2009 | 2009 Cyprus Cup | Larnaca, Cyprus | Netherlands | 2–1 | Sinclair 15', 34' |
| March 10, 2009 | 2009 Cyprus Cup | Larnaca, Cyprus | Russia | 2–0 | Sinclair 70', Tancredi 82' |
| March 12, 2009 | 2009 Cyprus Cup | Nicosia, Cyprus | England | 1–3 | Sinclair 14' |
| May 25, 2009 | Friendly | Toronto, Ontario | United States | 0–4 | |
| July 19, 2009 | Friendly | Rochester, United States | United States | 0–1 | |
| July 2, 2009 | Friendly | Charleston, United States | United States | 0–1 | |

== 2010–2019 ==
Canada Women's National Team 2010 Results (13W-3D-2L)
| Date | Tournament | Location | Opponent | Score | Scorers |
|---|---|---|---|---|---|
| February 20, 2010 | Friendly | Larnaca, Cyprus | Poland | 3–0 | Sinclair 25', Parker 41', Matheson 45' |
| February 24, 2010 | 2010 Cyprus Women's Cup | Larnaca, Cyprus | Switzerland | 2–1 | Sinclair 26', Julien 53' |
| February 27, 2010 | 2010 Cyprus Women's Cup | Larnaca, Cyprus | England | 1–0 | Julien 9' |
| March 1, 2010 | 2010 Cyprus Women's Cup | Larnaca, Cyprus | South Africa | 2–1 | Flock 54', Julien 75' |
| March 3, 2010 | 2010 Cyprus Women's Cup | Nicosia, Cyprus | New Zealand | 1–0 | Matheson 71' |
| April 24, 2010 | Friendly | Yongchuan, China PR | China | 0–2 | |
| June 3, 2010 | Friendly | Hamar, Norway | Norway | 1–1 | Bélanger 69' |
| September 15, 2010 | Friendly | Dresden, Germany | Germany | 0–5 | |
| September 30, 2010 | Friendly | Toronto, Ontario | China | 3–1 | Matheson 23', Tancredi 65', Sinclair 68' |
| October 29, 2010 | 2010 CONCACAF Women's Gold Cup | Cancún, Mexico | Trinidad and Tobago | 1–0 | Tancredi 63' |
| October 31, 2010 | 2010 CONCACAF Women's Gold Cup | Cancún, Mexico | Guyana | 8–0 | Julien 15', Sinclair 34', 50', 63', 75', Filigno 47', 76', Lang 90+1' |
| November 2, 2010 | 2010 CONCACAF Women's Gold Cup | Cancún, Mexico | Mexico | 3–0 | Chapman 20', Bélanger 45' Filigno 67' |
| November 5, 2010 | 2010 CONCACAF Women's Gold Cup | Cancún, Mexico | Costa Rica | 4–0 | Bélanger 62', Filigno 72', Sinclair 75', ? 90+3' (o.g.) |
| November 8, 2010 | 2010 CONCACAF Women's Gold Cup | Cancún, Mexico | Mexico | 1–0 | Sinclair 54' |
| December 9, 2010 | 2010 Torneio Internacional Cidade de São Paulo | São Paulo, Brazil | Netherlands | 5–0 | Sinclair 16', 74', Bélanger 52', Matheson 55', 67' |
| December 12, 2010 | 2010 Torneio Internacional Cidade de São Paulo | São Paulo, Brazil | Mexico | 1–0 | Sinclair 23' |
| December 15, 2010 | 2010 Torneio Internacional Cidade de São Paulo | São Paulo, Brazil | Brazil | 0–0 | |
| December 19, 2010 | 2010 Torneio Internacional Cidade de São Paulo | São Paulo, Brazil | Brazil | 2–2 | Bélanger 43'Sinclair 83' |

Canada Women's National Team 2011 Results (15W-3D-6L)
| Date | Tournament | Location | Opponent | Score | Scorers |
|---|---|---|---|---|---|
| January 21, 2011 | 2011 Four Nations Tournament | Yongchuan, China PR | China | 3–2 | Tancredi 56', Sinclair 80', 90+4' |
| January 23, 2011 | 2011 Four Nations Tournament | Yongchuan, China PR | United States | 1–2 | Tancredi 56' |
| January 25, 2011 | 2011 Four Nations Tournament | Yongchuan, China PR | Sweden | 1–0 | Sinclair 32' |
| March 2, 2011 | 2011 Cyprus Women's Cup | Larnaca, Cyprus | Scotland | 1–0 | Zurrer 70' |
| March 4, 2011 | 2011 Cyprus Women's Cup | Nicosia, Cyprus | Italy | 1–0 | Filigno 33' |
| March 7, 2011 | 2011 Cyprus Women's Cup | Nicosia, Cyprus | England | 2–0 | Sinclair 45+', Timko 55' |
| March 9, 2011 | 2011 Cyprus Women's Cup | Paralimni, Cyprus | Netherlands | 2–1 | Filigno 20', Zurrer 99' |
| April 2, 2011 | Friendly | Palestrina, Italy | Sweden | 0–1 | |
| May 15, 2011 | Friendly | Rome, Italy | Switzerland | 1–1 | Kyle 66' |
| May 18, 2011 | Friendly | Niederhasli, Switzerland | Switzerland | 2–1 | ? 25' (o.g.), Julien 70' |
| May 28, 2011 | Friendly | Rome, Italy | Netherlands | 2–0 | Robinson 55', Julien 63' |
| June 7, 2011 | Friendly | Telki, Hungary | Hungary | 1–0 | Matheson 87' |
| June 14, 2011 | Friendly | Rome, Italy | North Korea | 2–0 | Kyle 2', Filigno 40' |
| June 26, 2011 | 2011 FIFA Women's World Cup | Berlin, Germany | Germany | 1–2 | Sinclair 82' |
| June 30, 2011 | 2011 FIFA Women's World Cup | Bochum, Germany | France | 0–4 | |
| July 5, 2011 | 2011 FIFA Women's World Cup | Dresden, Germany | Nigeria | 0–1 | |
| September 17, 2011 | Friendly | Kansas City, United States | United States | 1–1 | Tancredi 42' |
| September 22, 2011 | Friendly | Portland, United States | United States | 0–3 | |
| October 18, 2011 | 2011 Pan American Games | Guadalajara, Mexico | Costa Rica | 3–1 | Julien 30', Sinclair 51', Pietrangelo 82' |
| October 20, 2011 | 2011 Pan American Games | Guadalajara, Mexico | Argentina | 1–0 | Julien 47' |
| October 22, 2011 | 2011 Pan American Games | Guadalajara, Mexico | Brazil | 0–0 | |
| October 25, 2011 | 2011 Pan American Games | Guadalajara, Mexico | Colombia | 2–1 | Kyle 48', Gayle 88' |
| October 27, 2011 | 2011 Pan American Games | Guadalajara, Mexico | Brazil | 1 (4)–1 (3) | Sinclair 87' |
| November 22, 2011 | Friendly | Phoenix, United States | Sweden | 2–1 | Buckland 75', Sinclair 90+1' |

Canada Women's National Team 2012 Results (14W-1D-7L)
| Date | Tournament | Location | Opponent | Score | Scorers |
|---|---|---|---|---|---|
| January 19, 2012 | 2012 CONCACAF Women's Olympic Qualifying Tournament | Vancouver, British Columbia | Haiti | 6–0 | Julien 7', Sinclair 25', 44', 55', 86', Parker 90+' |
| January 21, 2012 | 2012 CONCACAF Women's Olympic Qualifying Tournament | Vancouver, British Columbia | Cuba | 2–0 | Sinclair 17', Tancredi 25' |
| January 23, 2012 | 2012 CONCACAF Women's Olympic Qualifying Tournament | Vancouver, British Columbia | Costa Rica | 5–1 | Sinclair (?), Schmidt (?), Kyle (?), ? 50' (o.g.) |
| January 27, 2012 | 2012 CONCACAF Women's Olympic Qualifying Tournament | Vancouver, British Columbia | Mexico | 3–1 | Sinclair 15', 76', Tancredi 23' |
| January 29, 2012 | 2012 CONCACAF Women's Olympic Qualifying Tournament | Vancouver, British Columbia | United States | 0–4 | |
| February 28, 2012 | 2012 Cyprus Women's Cup | Larnaca, Cyprus | Scotland | 5–1 | Parker 6', Schmidt 36', 51', Sinclair 59', Tancredi 64' |
| March 1, 2012 | 2012 Cyprus Women's Cup | Nicosia, Cyprus | Italy | 2–1 | Sinclair 43', Gayle 90+1' |
| March 4, 2012 | 2012 Cyprus Women's Cup | Larnaca, Cyprus | Netherlands | 1–0 | Zurrer 84' |
| March 6, 2012 | 2012 Cyprus Women's Cup | Larnaca, Cyprus | France | 0–2 | |
| March 24, 2012 | Friendly | Foxborough, United States | Brazil | 2–1 | Sinclair 12', 78' |
| March 31, 2012 | Friendly | Malmö, Sweden | Sweden | 1–3 | Schmidt 87' |
| May 30, 2012 | Friendly | Moncton, New Brunswick | China | 1–0 | Sinclair 90+3' |
| June 30, 2012 | Friendly | Sandy, United States | United States | 1–2 | Tancredi 57' |
| July 9, 2012 | Friendly | Vevey, Switzerland | Colombia | 1–0 | Sinclair 31' |
| July 14, 2012 | Friendly | Châtel-Saint-Denis, Switzerland | New Zealand | 2–0 | Matheson 30', Sinclair 48' |
| July 17, 2012 | Friendly | Savièse, Switzerland | Brazil | 1–2 | Sinclair 90+2' |
| July 25, 2012 | 2012 Summer Olympics | Coventry, England | Japan | 1–2 | Tancredi 55' |
| July 28, 2012 | 2012 Summer Olympics | Coventry, England | South Africa | 3–0 | Tancredi 7', Sinclair 57', 86' |
| July 31, 2012 | 2012 Summer Olympics | Newcastle, England | Sweden | 2–2 | Tancredi 43', 83' |
| August 3, 2012 | 2012 Summer Olympics | Coventry, England | Great Britain | 2–0 | Filigno 12', Sinclair 25' |
| August 6, 2012 | 2012 Summer Olympics | Manchester, England | United States | 3–4 | Sinclair 22', 67', 73' |
| August 9, 2012 | 2012 Summer Olympics | Coventry, England | France | 1–0 | Matheson 90+1' |

Canada Women's National Team 2013 Results (7W-4D-6L)
| Date | Tournament | Location | Opponent | Score | Scorers |
|---|---|---|---|---|---|
| January 12, 2013 | 2013 Four Nations Tournament | Yongchuan, China PR | China | 1–0 | Leon 75' |
| January 14, 2013 | 2013 Four Nations Tournament | Yongchuan, China PR | South Korea | 1–3 | Prince 77' |
| January 16, 2013 | 2013 Four Nations Tournament | Yongchuan, China PR | Norway | 0–0 | |
| March 6, 2013 | 2013 Cyprus Women's Cup | Larnaca, Cyprus | Switzerland | 2–0 | Schmidt 2', Matheson 79' |
| March 8, 2013 | 2013 Cyprus Women's Cup | Nicosia, Cyprus | Finland | 2–1 | Filigno 30', Sinclair 37' |
| March 11, 2013 | 2013 Cyprus Women's Cup | Nicosia, Cyprus | Netherlands | 1–0 | Sinclair 42' |
| March 13, 2013 | 2013 Cyprus Women's Cup | Nicosia, Cyprus | England | 0–1 | |
| April 4, 2013 | Friendly | Nice, France | France | 1–1 | Kyle 90+4' |
| April 7, 2013 | Friendly | Rotherham, England | England | 0–1 | |
| June 2, 2013 | Friendly | Toronto, Ontario | United States | 0–3 | |
| June 19, 2013 | Friendly | Paderborn, Germany | Germany | 0–1 | |
| October 30, 2013 | Friendly | Edmonton, Alberta | South Korea | 3–0 | Sinclair 24', Timko 39', Leon 69' |
| November 24, 2013 | Friendly | Vancouver, British Columbia | Mexico | 0–0 | |
| December 12, 2013 | 2013 Torneio Internacional Brasília | Brasília, Brazil | Scotland | 2–0 | Leon 8', Sinclair 58' |
| December 15, 2013 | 2013 Torneio Internacional Brasília | Brasília, Brazil | Chile | 0–1 | |
| December 18, 2013 | 2013 Torneio Internacional Brasília | Brasília, Brazil | Brazil | 0–0 | |
| December 22, 2013 | 2013 Torneio Internacional Brasília | Brasília, Brazil | Scotland | 1–0 | Schmidt 83' |

Canada Women's National Team 2014 Results (4W-2D-5L)
| Date | Tournament | Location | Opponent | Score | Scorers |
|---|---|---|---|---|---|
| January 31, 2014 | Friendly | Frisco, United States | United States | 0–1 | |
| March 5, 2014 | 2014 Cyprus Women's Cup | Nicosia, Cyprus | Finland | 3–0 | Schmidt 35', 42', ? 60' (o.g.) |
| March 7, 2014 | 2014 Cyprus Women's Cup | Larnaca, Cyprus | Italy | 3–1 | Matheson 33', Leon 43', Kyle 49' |
| March 10, 2014 | 2014 Cyprus Women's Cup | Nicosia, Cyprus | England | 0–2 | |
| March 12, 2014 | 2014 Cyprus Women's Cup | Nicosia, Cyprus | Republic of Ireland | 2–1 | Matheson 56', Schmidt 90' |
| May 8, 2014 | Friendly | Winnipeg, Manitoba | United States | 1–1 | Buchanan 35' |
| June 18, 2014 | Friendly | Vancouver, British Columbia | Germany | 1–2 | Schmidt 52' |
| October 25, 2014 | Friendly | Edmonton, Alberta | Japan | 0–3 | |
| October 28, 2014 | Friendly | Vancouver, British Columbia | Japan | 2–3 | Schmidt 58', 90+1' |
| November 24, 2014 | Friendly | Los Angeles, United States | Sweden | 1–0 | Filigno 44' |
| November 26, 2014 | Friendly | Los Angeles, United States | Sweden | 1–1 | Sinclair 75' |

Canada Women's National Team 2015 Results (11W-2D-5L)
| Date | Tournament | Location | Opponent | Score | Scorers |
|---|---|---|---|---|---|
| January 11, 2015 | 2015 BaoAn Cup | Shenzhen, China PR | South Korea | 2–1 | Beckie 51', Buchanan 55' |
| January 13, 2015 | 2015 BaoAn Cup | Shenzhen, China PR | Mexico | 2–1 | Leon 47', Sinclair 80' |
| January 15, 2015 | 2015 BaoAn Cup | Shenzhen, China PR | China | 2–1 | Sinclair 63', 64' |
| March 4, 2015 | 2015 Cyprus Women's Cup | Nicosia, Cyprus | Scotland | 2–0 | Fleming 3', Sinclair 55' |
| March 6, 2015 | 2015 Cyprus Women's Cup | Larnaca, Cyprus | South Korea | 1–0 | Sinclair 46' |
| March 9, 2015 | 2015 Cyprus Women's Cup | Nicosia, Cyprus | Italy | 1–0 | Chapman 51' |
| March 11, 2015 | 2015 Cyprus Women's Cup | Larnaca, Cyprus | England | 0–1 | |
| April 9, 2015 | Friendly | Bondoufle, France | France | 0–1 | |
| May 29, 2015 | Friendly | Hamilton, Ontario | England | 1–0 | Schmidt 23' |
| June 6, 2015 | 2015 FIFA Women's World Cup | Edmonton, Alberta | China | 1–0 | Sinclair 90+2' |
| June 11, 2015 | 2015 FIFA Women's World Cup | Edmonton, Alberta | New Zealand | 0–0 | |
| June 15, 2015 | 2015 FIFA Women's World Cup | Montreal, Quebec | Netherlands | 1–1 | Lawrence 10' |
| June 21, 2015 | 2015 FIFA Women's World Cup | Vancouver, British Columbia | Switzerland | 1–0 | Bélanger 52' |
| June 27, 2015 | 2015 FIFA Women's World Cup | Vancouver, British Columbia | England | 1–2 | Sinclair 42' |
| December 9, 2015 | 2015 Torneio Internacional de Natal | Natal, Brazil | Mexico | 3–0 | Sinclair 15', 19', Prince 45+1' |
| December 13, 2015 | 2015 Torneio Internacional de Natal | Natal, Brazil | Trinidad and Tobago | 4–0 | Matheson 10', Quinn 46', Prince 81', Sinclair 85' |
| December 16, 2015 | 2015 Torneio Internacional de Natal | Natal, Brazil | Brazil | 1–2 | Bélanger 42' |
| December 20, 2015 | 2015 Torneio Internacional de Natal | Natal, Brazil | Brazil | 1–3 | Beckie 46' |

Canada Women's National Team 2016 Results (15W-0D-5L)
| Date | Tournament | Location | Opponent | Score | Scorers |
|---|---|---|---|---|---|
| February 11, 2016 | 2016 CONCACAF Women's Olympic Qualifying Championship | Houston, United States | Guyana | 5–0 | Rose 26', 39', Lawrence 28', 46', 48' |
| February 14, 2016 | 2016 CONCACAF Women's Olympic Qualifying Championship | Houston, United States | Trinidad and Tobago | 6–0 | Matheson 24', Tancredi 44', Sinclair 63', Buchanan 67', Beckie 75', Fleming 79' |
| February 16, 2016 | 2016 CONCACAF Women's Olympic Qualifying Championship | Houston, United States | Guatemala | 10–0 | Tancredi 4', 85', Carle 27', Beckie 36', Prince 43', 84', 89', Quinn 45', 49', 52' |
| February 19, 2016 | 2016 CONCACAF Women's Olympic Qualifying Championship | Houston, United States | Costa Rica | 5–1 | Sinclair 18', 52', Rose 86' |
| February 21, 2016 | 2016 CONCACAF Women's Olympic Qualifying Championship | Houston, United States | United States | 0–2 | |
| March 2, 2016 | 2016 Algarve Cup | Albufeira, Portugal | Denmark | 0–1 | |
| March 4, 2016 | 2016 Algarve Cup | Vila Real de Santo António, Portugal | Belgium | 1–0 | Clarke 87' |
| March 7, 2016 | 2016 Algarve Cup | Lagos, Portugal | Iceland | 1–0 | Beckie 41' |
| March 9, 2016 | 2016 Algarve Cup | Lagos, Portugal | Brazil | 2–1 | Zadorsky 61', Beckie 67' |
| April 10, 2016 | Friendly | Eindhoven, Netherlands | Netherlands | 2–1 | Sinclair 34', Beckie 57' |
| June 4, 2016 | Friendly | Toronto, Ontario | Brazil | 0–2 | |
| June 7, 2016 | Friendly | Ottawa, Ontario | Brazil | 1–0 | Beckie 90' |
| July 20, 2016 | Friendly | Paris, France | China | 1–0 | Fleming 6' |
| July 23, 2016 | Friendly | Paris, France | France | 0–1 | |
| August 3, 2016 | 2016 Summer Olympics | São Paulo, Brazil | Australia | 2–0 | Beckie 1', Sinclair 80' |
| August 6, 2016 | 2016 Summer Olympics | São Paulo, Brazil | Zimbabwe | 3–1 | Beckie 7', 35', Sinclair 19' |
| August 9, 2016 | 2016 Summer Olympics | Brasília, Brazil | Germany | 2–1 | Tancredi 26', 59' |
| August 12, 2016 | 2016 Summer Olympics | São Paulo, Brazil | France | 1–0 | Schmidt 56' |
| August 16, 2016 | 2016 Summer Olympics | Belo Horizonte, Brazil | Germany | 0–2 | |
| August 19, 2016 | 2016 Summer Olympics | São Paulo, Brazil | Brazil | 2–1 | Rose 25', Sinclair 52' |

Canada Women's National Team 2017 Results (7W-2D-3L)
| Date | Tournament | Location | Opponent | Score | Scorers |
|---|---|---|---|---|---|
| February 11, 2017 | Friendly | Vancouver, British Columbia | Mexico | 3–2 | Rose 14', Beckie 26', 40' |
| March 1, 2017 | 2017 Algarve Cup | Lagos, Portugal | Denmark | 1–0 | Sinclair 90' |
| March 3, 2017 | 2017 Algarve Cup | São João da Venda, Portugal | Russia | 2–1 | Schmidt 10', Sinclair 26' |
| March 6, 2017 | 2017 Algarve Cup | São João da Venda, Portugal | Portugal | 0–0 | |
| March 8, 2017 | 2017 Algarve Cup | São João da Venda, Portugal | Spain | 0–1 | |
| April 6, 2017 | Friendly | Trelleborg, Sweden | Sweden | 1–0 | Beckie 34' |
| April 9, 2017 | Friendly | Erfurt, Germany | Germany | 1–2 | Rose 38' |
| June 8, 2017 | Friendly | Winnipeg, Manitoba | Costa Rica | 3–1 | Fleming 3', Sinclair 52' (pen.), Leon 90+1' |
| June 11, 2017 | Friendly | Toronto, Ontario | Costa Rica | 6–0 | Rose 2', Beckie 6', 13', 21', Jordyn Huitema 73', 74' |
| November 9, 2017 | Friendly | Vancouver, British Columbia | United States | 1–1 | Leon 57' |
| November 12, 2017 | Friendly | San Jose, United States | United States | 1–3 | Beckie 48' |
| November 28, 2017 | Friendly | Marbella, Spain | Norway | 3–2 | Sinclair 52', Beckie 64', Leon 66' |

Canada Women's National Team 2018 Results (8W-0D-4L)
| Date | Tournament | Location | Opponent | Score | Scorers |
|---|---|---|---|---|---|
| February 28, 2018 | 2018 Algarve Cup | Lagos, Portugal | Sweden | 1–3 | Beckie 47' |
| March 2, 2018 | 2018 Algarve Cup | São João da Venda, Portugal | Russia | 1–0 | Sinclair 25' |
| March 5, 2018 | 2018 Algarve Cup | Lagos, Portugal | South Korea | 3–0 | Sinclair 24', 79', Fleming 73' |
| March 7, 2018 | 2018 Algarve Cup | Lagos, Portugal | Japan | 2–0 | Beckie 20', Lawrence 50' |
| April 9, 2018 | Friendly | Rennes, France | France | 0–1 | |
| June 10, 2018 | Friendly | Hamilton, Ontario | Germany | 2–3 | Sinclair 59', Fleming 69' |
| September 2, 2018 | Friendly | Ottawa, Ontario | Brazil | 1–0 | Prince 49' |
| October 5, 2018 | 2018 CONCACAF Women's Championship | Edinburg, United States | Jamaica | 2–0 | Prince 33', 79' |
| October 8, 2018 | 2018 CONCACAF Women's Championship | Edinburg, United States | Cuba | 12–0 | Leon 11', 23', 55', 58', Huitema 12', 37', 51', 71', Rose 25', Quinn 56', Sinclair 63', Matheson 72' |
| October 11, 2018 | 2018 CONCACAF Women's Championship | Edinburg, United States | Costa Rica | 3–1 | Beckie 26', Prince 40', Sinclair 57' |
| October 14, 2018 | 2018 CONCACAF Women's Championship | Frisco, United States | Panama | 7–0 | Sinclair 44', 49', Fleming 48', Beckie 58', Quinn 63', Leon 76', 78' |
| October 17, 2018 | 2018 CONCACAF Women's Championship | Frisco, United States | United States | 0–2 | |

Canada Women's National Team 2019 Results (8W-3D-4L)
| Date | Tournament | Location | Opponent | Score | Scorers |
|---|---|---|---|---|---|
| January 22, 2019 | Friendly | La Manga, Spain | Norway | 1–0 | Sinclair 66' |
| February 27, 2019 | 2019 Algarve Cup | Parchal, Portugal | Iceland | 0–0 | |
| March 1, 2019 | 2019 Algarve Cup | Lagos, Portugal | Scotland | 1–0 | Sinclair 82' (pen.) |
| March 6, 2019 | 2019 Algarve Cup | Faro, Portugal | Sweden | 0–0 (6–5 pen.) | |
| April 5, 2019 | Friendly | Manchester, England | England | 1–0 | Sinclair 80' |
| April 8, 2019 | Friendly | Murcia, Spain | Nigeria | 2–1 | Beckie 47', Schmidt 53' |
| May 18, 2019 | Friendly | Toronto, Ontario | Mexico | 3–0 | Fleming 20', Sinclair 53', Leon 83' |
| May 24, 2019 | Friendly | Logroño, Spain | Spain | 0–0 | |
| June 6, 2019 | 2019 FIFA Women's World Cup Group E | Montpellier, France | Cameroon | 1–0 | Buchanan 45' |
| June 15, 2019 | 2019 FIFA Women's World Cup Group E | Grenoble, France | New Zealand | 2–0 | Fleming 48', Prince 79' |
| June 20, 2019 | 2019 FIFA Women's World Cup Group E | Reims, France | Netherlands | 1–2 | Sinclair 60' |
| June 24, 2019 | 2019 FIFA Women's World Cup knockout stage | Paris, France | Sweden | 0–1 | |
| October 6, 2019 | Friendly | Shizuoka, Japan | Japan | 0–4 | |
| November 7, 2019 | 2019 Yongchuan International Tournament | Chongqing, China | Brazil | 0–4 | |
| November 10, 2019 | 2019 Yongchuan International Tournament | Chongqing, China | New Zealand | 3–0 | Sinclair 35', Beckie 64', 67' |

== 2020–2029 ==
Canada Women's National Team 2020 Results (4W-2D-2L)
| Date | Tournament | Location | Opponent | Score | Scorers |
|---|---|---|---|---|---|
| January 29, 2020 | 2020 CONCACAF Women's Olympic Qualifying Championship | Edinburg, United States | Saint Kitts and Nevis | 11–0 | Sinclair 7', 23', Leon 12', 26', 43', 80', Lawrence 18', 57', Riviere 40', Fleming 54', Huitema 74' |
| February 1, 2020 | 2020 CONCACAF Women's Olympic Qualifying Championship | Edinburg, United States | Jamaica | 9–0 | Huitema 10', 55', 62', 81', 90+3', Rose 16', Beckie 44', 51', 66' |
| February 4, 2020 | 2020 CONCACAF Women's Olympic Qualifying Championship | Edinburg, United States | Mexico | 2–0 | Sinclair 26', Zadorsky 45+1' |
| February 7, 2020 | 2020 CONCACAF Women's Olympic Qualifying Championship | Carson, United States | Costa Rica | 1–0 | Huitema 72' |
| February 9, 2020 | 2020 CONCACAF Women's Olympic Qualifying Championship | Carson, United States | United States | 0–3 | |
| March 4, 2020 | 2020 Tournoi de France | Calais, France | France | 0–1 | |
| March 7, 2020 | 2020 Tournoi de France | Calais, France | Netherlands | 0–0 | |
| March 10, 2020 | 2020 Tournoi de France | Calais, France | Brazil | 2–2 | Matheson 74', Beckie 87' |

Canada Women's National Team 2021 Results (7W-7D-3L)
| Date | Tournament | Location | Opponent | Score | Scorers |
|---|---|---|---|---|---|
| February 18, 2021 | 2021 SheBelieves Cup | Orlando, United States | United States | 0–1 | |
| February 21, 2021 | 2021 SheBelieves Cup | Orlando, United States | Argentina | 1–0 | Stratigakis 90+2' |
| February 24, 2021 | 2021 SheBelieves Cup | Orlando, United States | Brazil | 0–2 | |
| April 9, 2021 | Friendly | Cardiff, Wales | Wales | 3–0 | Rose 25', Viens 59', Fleming 63' |
| April 13, 2021 | Friendly | Stoke-on-Trent, England | England | 2–0 | Viens 3', Prince 86' |
| June 11, 2021 | Friendly | Cartagena, Spain | Czech Republic | 0–0 | |
| June 14, 2021 | Friendly | Cartagena, Spain | Brazil | 0–0 | |
| July 21, 2021 | 2020 Summer Olympics – Group E | Sapporo, Japan | Japan | 1–1 | Sinclair 6' |
| July 24, 2021 | 2020 Summer Olympics – Group E | Sapporo, Japan | Chile | 2–1 | Beckie 39', 47' |
| July 27, 2021 | 2020 Summer Olympics – Group E | Kashima, Japan | Great Britain | 1–1 | Leon 55' |
| July 30, 2021 | 2020 Summer Olympics – Quarter Final | Rifu, Japan | Brazil | 0–0 (4–3 pen.) | |
| August 2, 2021 | 2020 Summer Olympics – Semi Final | Kashima, Japan | United States | 1–0 | Fleming 75' (pen.) |
| August 6, 2021 | 2020 Summer Olympics – Final | Yokohama, Japan | Sweden | 1–1 (3–2 pen.) | Fleming 68' (pen.) |
| October 23, 2021 | Friendly | Ottawa, Ontario | New Zealand | 5–1 | Fleming 12', Sinclair 41', Prince 57', Leon 75', 82' |
| October 26, 2021 | Friendly | Montreal, Quebec | New Zealand | 1–0 | Leon 16' |
| November 27, 2021 | Friendly | Mexico City, Mexico | Mexico | 1–2 | Huitema 86' |
| November 30, 2021 | Friendly | Mexico City, Mexico | Mexico | 0–0 | |

Canada Women's National Team 2022 Results (11W-3D-3L)
| Date | Tournament | Location | Opponent | Score | Scorers |
|---|---|---|---|---|---|
| February 17, 2022 | 2022 Arnold Clark Cup | Middlesbrough, England | England | 1–1 | Beckie 55' |
| February 20, 2022 | 2022 Arnold Clark Cup | Norwich, England | Germany | 1–0 | Gilles 7' |
| February 23, 2022 | 2022 Arnold Clark Cup | Wolverhampton, England | Spain | 0–1 | |
| April 8, 2022 | Friendly | Vancouver, British Columbia | Nigeria | 2–0 | Fleming 51', Gilles 72' |
| April 11, 2022 | Friendly | Langford, British Columbia | Nigeria | 2–2 | Sinclair 49', Zadorsky 88' |
| June 26, 2022 | Friendly | Toronto, Ontario | South Korea | 0–0 | |
| July 5, 2022 | CONCACAF Championship GS | Guadalupe, Mexico | Trinidad and Tobago | 6–0 | Sinclair 27', Grosso 67', 79', Fleming 84', Beckie 86', Huitema 90+1' |
| July 8, 2022 | CONCACAF Championship GS | San Nicolás de los Garza, Mexico | Panama | 1–0 | Grosso 64' |
| July 11, 2022 | CONCACAF Championship GS | Guadalupe, Mexico | Costa Rica | 2–0 | Fleming 5', Schmidt 69' |
| July 14, 2022 | CONCACAF Championship SF | San Nicolás de los Garza, Mexico | Jamaica | 3–0 | Fleming 18', Chapman 64', Leon 76' |
| July 18, 2022 | CONCACAF Championship F | Guadalupe, Mexico | United States | 0–1 | |
| September 3, 2022 | Friendly | Brisbane, Australia | Australia | 1–0 | Leon 11' |
| September 6, 2022 | Friendly | Sydney, Australia | Australia | 2–1 | Leon 48', 64' |
| October 6, 2022 | Friendly | Cádiz, Spain | Argentina | 2–0 | Santana 68' (o.g.), Lacasse 87' |
| October 10, 2022 | Friendly | Jerez, Spain | Morocco | 4–0 | Fleming 24', Viens 54', Beckie 84', Larisey 90' |
| November 11, 2022 | Friendly | Santos, Brazil | Brazil | 2–1 | Zadorsky 21', Leon 29' |
| November 15, 2022 | Friendly | São Paulo, Brazil | Brazil | 1–2 | Lawrence 60' (pen.) |

Canada Women's National Team 2023 Results (7W-1D-5L)
| Date | Tournament | Location | Opponent | Score | Scorers |
|---|---|---|---|---|---|
| February 16, 2023 | 2023 SheBelieves Cup | Orlando, United States | United States | 0–2 | |
| February 19, 2023 | 2023 SheBelieves Cup | Nashville, United States | Brazil | 2–0 | Gilles 31', Viens 71' |
| February 22, 2023 | 2023 SheBelieves Cup | Frisco, United States | Japan | 0–3 | |
| April 11, 2023 | Friendly | Le Mans, France | France | 1–2 | Huitema 71' |
| July 20, 2023 | 2023 FIFA Women's World Cup Group B | Melbourne, Australia | Nigeria | 0–0 | |
| July 26, 2023 | 2023 FIFA Women's World Cup Group B | Perth, Australia | Republic of Ireland | 2–1 | Connolly 45+5' (o.g.), Leon 53' |
| July 31, 2023 | 2023 FIFA Women's World Cup Group B | Melbourne, Australia | Australia | 0–4 | |
| September 22, 2023 | CONCACAF Olympic play-off | Kingston, Jamaica | Jamaica | 2–0 | Prince 18', Leon 90+3' |
| September 26, 2023 | CONCACAF Olympic play-off | Toronto, Ontario | Jamaica | 2–1 | Lacasse 40', Huitema 50' |
| October 28, 2023 | Friendly | Montréal, Quebec | Brazil | 0–1 | |
| October 31, 2023 | Friendly | Halifax, Nova Scotia | Brazil | 2–0 | Huitema 69', Rose 89' |
| December 1, 2023 | Friendly | Langford, British Columbia | Australia | 5–0 | Prince 10', 43', Lacasse 49', Awujo 55', Leon 62' |
| December 5, 2023 | Friendly | Vancouver, British Columbia | Australia | 1–0 | Quinn 40' |

Canada Women's National Team 2024 Results (9W-7D-0L)
| Date | Tournament | Location | Opponent | Score | Scorers |
|---|---|---|---|---|---|
| February 22, 2024 | W Gold Cup Group C | Houston, United States | El Salvador | 6–0 | Lacasse 3', Huitema 24', Leon 28', 59', Buchanan 62', Smith 86' |
| February 25, 2024 | W Gold Cup Group C | Houston, United States | Paraguay | 4–0 | Leon 25', 49', 57', Smith 39' |
| February 28, 2024 | W Gold Cup Group C | Houston, United States | Costa Rica | 3–0 | Huitema 11', Zadorsky 27', 57' |
| March 2, 2024 | W Gold Cup QF | Los Angeles, United States | Costa Rica | 1–0 | Viens 104' |
| March 6, 2024 | W Gold Cup SF | San Diego, United States | United States | 2–2 (1–3 pen.) | Huitema 82', Leon 120+7' |
| April 6, 2024 | SheBelieves Cup SF | Atlanta, United States | Brazil | 1–1 (4–2 pen.) | Gilles 77' |
| April 9, 2024 | SheBelieves Cup F | Columbus, United States | United States | 2–2 (4–5 pen.) | Leon 40', 86' |
| June 1, 2024 | Friendly | Montreal, Quebec | Mexico | 2–0 | Leon 73', Lacasse 86' |
| June 4, 2024 | Friendly | Toronto, Ontario | Mexico | 1–1 | Buchanan 48' |
| July 25, 2024 | Olympics GS | Saint-Étienne, France | New Zealand | 2–1 | Lacasse 45+4', Viens 79' |
| July 28, 2024 | Olympics GS | Saint-Étienne, France | France | 2–1 | Fleming 58', Gilles 90+12' |
| July 31, 2024 | Olympics GS | Nice, France | Colombia | 1–0 | Gilles 61' |
| August 3, 2024 | Olympics QF | Marseille, France | Germany | 0–0 (2–4 pen.) | |
| October 25, 2024 | Friendly | Almendralejo, Spain | Spain | 1–1 | Alidou 49' |
| November 29, 2024 | Friendly | San Pedro del Pinatar, Spain | Iceland | 0–0 | |
| December 3, 2024 | Friendly | San Pedro del Pinatar, Spain | South Korea | 5–1 | Seon-joo 22' (o.g.), Alidou 52', Smith 58', Gilles 78', Leon 90+2' |

Canada Women's National Team 2025 Results (6W-1D-6L)
| Date | Tournament | Location | Opponent | Score | Scorers |
|---|---|---|---|---|---|
| February 19, 2025 | 2025 Pinatar Cup | San Pedro del Pinatar, Spain | China | 1–1 | Grosso 16' |
| February 22, 2025 | 2025 Pinatar Cup | San Pedro del Pinatar, Spain | Mexico | 2–0 | Gilles 51', Leon 89' |
| February 25, 2025 | 2025 Pinatar Cup | San Pedro del Pinatar, Spain | Chinese Taipei | 7–0 | Alidou 4', 14' (pen.), 33', Huitema 26', 48' (pen.), Reid 45+1', Larisey 75' |
| April 4, 2025 | Friendly | Vancouver, British Columbia | Argentina | 3–0 | J. Rose 24', Prince 39', Grosso 87' |
| April 8, 2025 | Friendly | Langford, British Columbia | Argentina | 0–1 | |
| May 31, 2025 | Friendly | Winnipeg, Manitoba | Haiti | 4–1 | Leon 7', 9', Zadorsky 50', Smith 90' |
| June 3, 2025 | Friendly | Montréal, Québec | Haiti | 3–1 | Viens 16', 42', Ward 23' |
| June 27, 2025 | Friendly | Toronto, Ontario | Costa Rica | 4–1 | Zadorsky 70' (pen.), Ward 74', Chavoshi 82', Regan 86' |
| July 2, 2025 | Friendly | Washington, United States | United States | 0–3 | |
| October 24, 2025 | Friendly | Lucerne, Switzerland | Switzerland | 0–1 | |
| October 28, 2025 | Friendly | Nijmegen, Netherlands | Netherlands | 0–1 | |
| November 29, 2025 | Friendly | Nagasaki, Japan | Japan | 0–3 | |
| December 2, 2025 | Friendly | Isahaya, Japan | Japan | 0–1 | |

Canada Women's National Team 2026 Results (4W-2D-3L)
| Date | Tournament | Location | Opponent | Score | Scorers |
|---|---|---|---|---|---|
| March 1, 2026 | 2026 SheBelieves Cup | Nashville, United States | Colombia | 4–1 | Gilles 31', Sonis 67', Collins 73', Prince 90' |
| March 4, 2026 | 2026 SheBelieves Cup | Columbus, United States | United States | 0–1 | |
| March 7, 2026 | 2026 SheBelieves Cup | Harrison, United States | Argentina | 0–0 (3–2 pen.) | |
| April 11, 2026 | 2026 FIFA Series | Cuiabá, Brazil | Zambia | 4–0 | Prince 41', 45+1', Chukwu 80', 88' |
| April 14, 2026 | 2026 FIFA Series | Cuiabá, Brazil | South Korea | 3–1 | Viens 23', Gilles 50', 70' |
| April 18, 2026 | 2026 FIFA Series | Cuiabá, Brazil | Brazil | 0–1 | |
| June 9, 2026 | Friendly | Santa Ana, Costa Rica | Costa Rica | 6–0 | Viens 7', Sonis 41', 54' (pen.), 78' (pen.), Huitema 84', Alidou 90+2' |
| October 9, 2026 | Friendly | Montreal, Quebec | Denmark | 1–1 | Smith 84' |
| October 12, 2026 | Friendly | Toronto, Ontario | Denmark | 3–4 | Pridham 10', Viens 49', Smith 70' |
| November 28, 2026 | 2026 CONCACAF W Championship | Mansfield, United States | Panama | | |

== Sources ==
- "Matches". Canadian Soccer Association. 18 January 2020. Archived from the original on March 5, 2024.
- "Canada - Results and fixtures". Soccerway. Archived from the original on March 5, 2024.
