= 2002 Algarve Cup =

International women's football tournament

Tournament details
- Host country: Portugal
- City: various cities in Algarve
- Dates: 1–7 March 2002
- Teams: 12 (from 3 confederations)

Final positions
- Champions: China (2nd title)
- Runners-up: Norway
- Third place: Sweden
- Fourth place: Germany

Tournament statistics
- Matches played: 24
- Goals scored: 88 (3.67 per match)
- Top scorer(s): (United States) Shannon MacMillan (seven goals)

The 2002 Algarve Cup was the ninth edition of the Algarve Cup, an invitational women's football tournament hosted annually by Portugal. It was held from first to seventh of March 2002. This was the first edition where the tournament was expanded to twelve teams; all prior editions had eight teams participation. The tournament was won by China, defeating Norway 2–0 in the final-game. Sweden ended up third defeating Germany, 2–1, in the third prize game.

== Format ==
The twelve invited teams are split into three groups that played a round-robin tournament.

With 12 teams participating, the Algarve Cup format has been as follows: Groups A and B, containing the strongest ranked teams, are the only ones in contention to win the title. The group A and B winners contest the final - to win the Algarve Cup. The runners-up play for third place, and those that finish third in the groups play for fifth place. The teams in Group C played for places 7–12. The winner of Group C played the team that finished fourth in Group A or B (whichever has the better record) for seventh place. The Group C runner-up played the team who finishes last in Group A or B (with the worse record) for ninth place. The third and fourth-placed teams in Group C played for the eleventh place.

Points awarded in the group stage followed the standard formula of three points for a win, one point for a draw and zero points for a loss. In the case of two teams being tied on the same number of points in a group, their head-to-head result determined the higher place.

== Participating teams ==
- China
- Denmark
- Finland
- Germany
- England
- Norway
- Sweden
- United States
- Canada
- Portugal
- Scotland
- Wales

== Group stage ==
=== Group A ===
Team	Pld	W	D	L	GF	GA	GD	Pts
China	3	3	0	0	9	3	+6	9
Germany	3	2	0	1	7	4	+3	6
Denmark	3	1	0	2	2	4	−2	3
Finland	3	0	0	3	1	8	−7	0

1 March 2002

Denmark	0–3	Germany
		34' Ariane Hingst; 51' Petra Wimbersky; 57' Müller

Portimão
1 March 2002

China	4–1	Finland
35', 70' Ren Liping; 40' Bai Jie; 56' Pu Wei		76' Minna Mustonen

Portimão
3 March 2002

Finland	0–2	Denmark
		62' Christina Bonde; 74' Lene Jensen

Santo António
3 March 2002

Germany	2–4	China
17' Kerstin Stegemann; 50' Renate Lingor		30', 62' Pu Wei; 31', 79' Bai Jie

Santo António
5 March 2002

Denmark	0–1	China
		80' Pu Wei

Olhão
5 March 2002

Finland	0–2	Germany
		48' Petra Wimbersky; 58' Bettina Wiegmann

Olhão

=== Group B ===
Team	Pld	W	D	L	GF	GA	GD	Pts
Norway	3	2	1	0	9	6	+3	7
Sweden	3	1	2	0	10	7	+3	5
United States	3	1	1	1	5	4	+1	4
England	3	0	0	3	4	11	−7	0

1 March 2002

Sweden	1–1	United States
62' Victoria Svensson	Report; SvFF Report (in Swedish)	31' Shannon MacMillan

Albufeira
1 March 2002

Norway	3–1	England
8' Dagny Mellgren; 33' Anne Tønnessen; 79' Hege Riise		18' Angela Banks

Ferreiras
3 March 2002

Sweden	3–3	Norway
14' Victoria Svensson; 35' Hanna Marklund; 59' Hanna Ljungberg	SvFF Report (in Swedish)	3' Dagny Mellgren; 52' Anita Rapp; 75' Solveig Gulbrandsen

Ferreiras
3 March 2002

United States	2–0	England
58' Shannon MacMillan; 75' Kelly Wilson	Report

Ferreiras
5 March 2002

England	3–6	Sweden
47', 53' Karen Walker; 88' Amanda Barr	SvFF Report (in Swedish)	7', 41' Therese Sjögran; 8' Elin Flyborg; 69' Hanna Ljungberg; 79', 89' Bjorn

Lagos
5 March 2002

Norway	3–2	United States
23' Hege Riise; 29' Dagny Mellgren; 84' Solveig Gulbrandsen	Report	14', 59' Shannon MacMillan

Lagos

=== Group C ===
Team	Pld	W	D	L	GF	GA	GD	Pts
Canada	3	3	0	0	14	1	+13	9
Scotland	3	2	0	1	3	4	−1	6
Wales	3	1	0	2	1	5	−4	3
Portugal	3	0	0	3	2	10	−8	0

1 March 2002

Canada	3–0	Scotland
19', 25', 30' Andrea Neil	Report

Quarteira
1 March 2002

Portugal	0–1	Wales
	Report	7' Ayshea Martyn

Quarteira
3 March 2002

Canada	4–0	Wales
24', 69' Christine Sinclair; 63', 90' Kara Lang	Report

Lagoa
3 March 2002

Portugal	1–2	Scotland
37' Carla Couto	Report	14', 90' Julie Fleeting

Lagoa
5 March 2002

Wales	0–1	Scotland
		25' Julie Fleeting

Silves
5 March 2002

Portugal	1–7	Canada
63' Patricia Sequeira	Report; Report	3' Amber Allen; 16' Randee Hermus; 31', 84' Christine Sinclair; 48', 62' Kara Lang; 60' Heather Smith

Silves

== Placement play-offs ==
=== Eleventh place match ===
7 March 2002

Wales	0–4	Portugal
	Report	3', 16' Sonia Silva; 20', 29' Paula Cristina

Montechoro

=== Ninth place match ===
7 March 2002

England	4–1	Scotland
(x) Karen Walker; 42'Vicky Exley (x)Fara Williams; 70' Karen Burke		25' Stacey Cook

Quarteira

=== Seventh place match ===
7 March 2002

Finland	3–0	Canada
57' Laura Kalmari; 64' (penalty) Anne Mäkinen; 88' Minna Mustonen	Report

Lagoa

=== Fifth place match ===
7 March 2002

United States	3–2	Denmark
31', 36', 63' Shannon MacMillan	Report	49' Lene Jensen; 77' Lene Terp

Montechoro

=== Third place match ===
7 March 2002

Sweden	2–1	Germany
20' Hanna Ljungberg; 54' Malin Andersson	SvFF Report (in Swedish)	69' Kerstin Garefrekes

Faro

=== Final ===
7 March 2002

China	1–0	Norway
18' Zhao Lihong

Loulé

2002 Algarve Cup

China
Second title

== Final standings ==
Rank	Team
1st place, gold medalist(s)	China
2nd place, silver medalist(s)	Norway
3rd place, bronze medalist(s)	Sweden
4	Germany
5	United States
6	Denmark
7	Finland
8	Canada
9	England
10	Scotland
11	Portugal
12	Wales

== Goal scorers ==
Goals	Player
7	(United States) Shannon MacMillan
3	(Canada) Andrea Neil
3	(Canada) Christine Sinclair
3	(Canada) Kara Lang
3	(China) Bai Jie
3	(China) Pu Wei
3	(Norway) Dagny Mellgren
3	(Scotland) Julie Fleeting
3	(Sweden) Hanna Ljungberg
2	(Denmark) Lene Jensen
2	(Finland) Minna Mustonen
2	(Germany) Petra Wimbersky
2	(Norway) Solveig Gulbrandsen
2	(Norway) Hege Riise
2	(Portugal) Sonia Silva
2	(Portugal) Paula Cristina
2	(Sweden) Victoria Svensson
2	(United States) Karen Walker
1	39 athletes
0 own goal
