= 2010 Cyprus Women's Cup =

Tournament details
- Host country: Cyprus
- Dates: 24 February – 3 March 2010
- Teams: 8

Final positions
- Champions: Canada (2nd title)
- Runners-up: New Zealand
- Third place: Netherlands
- Fourth place: Switzerland

Tournament statistics
- Matches played: 16
- Goals scored: 44 (2.75 per match)
- Top scorer(s): (Netherlands) Manon Melis (New Zealand) Amber Hearn (4 goals)

The 2010 Cyprus Women's Cup was the third edition of the Cyprus Women's Cup, an invitational women's football tournament held annually in Cyprus.

== Group stage ==
=== Group A ===
Team	Pld	W	D	L	GF	GA	GD	Pts
New Zealand	3	2	1	0	5	1	+4	7
Netherlands	3	1	2	0	6	3	+3	5
Italy	3	1	1	1	3	2	+1	4
Scotland	3	0	0	3	1	9	−8	0

24 February 2010

Scotland	1−4	Netherlands
Grant 45'	Report	Melis 13', 53'; Smit 28'; Pieëte 55'

24 February 2010

New Zealand	1−0	Italy
Hearn 30'

26 February 2010

Italy	2−0	Scotland
Domenichetti 82'; Tuttino 89'

26 February 2010

Netherlands	1−1	New Zealand
Melis 27'	Report	Hearn 18' (pen.)

1 March 2010

New Zealand	3−0	Scotland
Hearn 4', 36'; Green 33'

1 March 2010

Italy	1−1	Netherlands
Pini 32'	Report	Hoogendijk 80'

=== Group B ===
Team	Pld	W	D	L	GF	GA	GD	Pts
Canada	3	3	0	0	5	2	+3	9
Switzerland	3	1	1	1	6	5	+1	4
England	3	1	1	1	3	3	0	4
South Africa	3	0	0	3	2	6	−4	0

24 February 2010

England	1−0	South Africa
J. Scott 5'

24 February 2010

Canada	2−1	Switzerland
Sinclair 26' (pen.); Julien 53'		Dickenmann 23'

26 February 2010

Switzerland	3−1	South Africa
Bachmann 15', 44' van Wyk 52' (o.g.)		Popela 20'

27 February 2010

England	0−1	Canada
		Julien 10'

1 March 2010

South Africa	1−2	Canada
Matlou 45'		Flock 54'; Julien 75'

1 March 2010

England	2−2	Switzerland
Stoney 56'; Sanderson 76'		Dickenmann 27', 84'

== Knockout stage ==
=== Seventh place match ===
3 March 2010

South Africa	1–2	Scotland
Matlou 27'		Lauder 79'; Little 82'

=== Fifth place match ===
3 March 2010

England	3–2	Italy
A. Scott 10', 58'; White 90'	Report	Brown 44' (o.g.); Camporese 64'

=== Third place match ===
3 March 2010

Netherlands	4–0	Switzerland
Melis 29'; Smit 56', 80' van de Ven 90'	Report

=== Final ===
3 March 2010

New Zealand	0–1	Canada
	Report	Matheson 70'

== Champion ==
2010 Cyprus Cup

Canada
Second title

== Goalscorers ==
4 goals

- (Netherlands) Manon Melis
- (New Zealand) Amber Hearn

3 goals

- (Canada) Christina Julien
- (Netherlands) Sylvia Smit
- (Switzerland) Lara Dickenmann

2 goals

- (England) Alex Scott
- (Switzerland) Ramona Bachmann
- (South Africa) Noko Matlou

1 goal

- (Canada) Kendra Flock
- (Canada) Diana Matheson
- (Canada) Christine Sinclair
- (England) Lianne Sanderson
- (England) Jill Scott
- (England) Casey Stoney
- (England) Faye White
- (Italy) Elisa Camporese
- (Italy) Giulia Domenichetti
- (Italy) Carolina Pini
- (Italy) Alessia Tuttino
- (Netherlands) Anouk Hoogendijk
- (Netherlands) Marlous Pieëte
- (Netherlands) Kirsten van de Ven
- (New Zealand) Anna Green
- (Scotland) Suzanne Grant
- (Scotland) Hayley Lauder
- (Scotland) Kim Little
- (South Africa) Mamphase Popela

Own goals

- (England) Rachel Brown (playing against Italy)
- (South Africa) Janine Van Wyk (playing against Switzerland)
