= Delphine Blanc =

French footballer (born 1983)

Personal information
- Date of birth: 7 June 1983 (age 43)
- Place of birth: La Tronche, France
- Height: 1.68 m (5 ft 6 in)
- Position: Right back

Youth career
- 1994–1999: Saint-Cyr au Mont d'Or
- 1999–2001: SC Caluire

Senior career*
Years	Team	Apps	(Gls)
2001–2002	SC Caluire	16	(1)
2002–2007	Lyon	91	(18)
2007–2009	Saint-Étienne	42	(7)
2009–2010	Montpellier	16	(3)
2010–2011	Rodez	20	(2)
2011–2012	Paris Saint-Germain	15	(3)

International career^{‡}
2006	France U21	2	(0)
2006–	France	13	(3)
- * Club domestic league appearances and goals as of 16 September 2016 (UTC) ‡ National team caps and goals as of 16 September 2016 (UTC)

Delphine Blanc (born 7 June 1983) is a French football player who last played for Paris Saint-Germain of the Division 1 Féminine. She plays as a right back, but is also capable of playing in the midfield. Blanc is currently a member of the senior team, having made her debut in 2006. She played with the team at UEFA Women's Euro 2009.

== International goals ==
#	Date	Venue	Opponent	Score	Result	Competition
1	8 March 2008	Stade Mohamed V, Casablanca, Morocco	Morocco	0–3	0–6	Friendly
2	12 February 2009	Stade des Allées, Blois, France	Republic of Ireland	1–0	2–0	Friendly
3	5 March 2009	Ammochostos Stadium, Larnaca, Cyprus	Scotland	1–0	2–0	2009 Cyprus Cup
Correct as of 1 September 2016
