= 2009 Cyprus Women's Cup =

Tournament details
- Host country: Cyprus
- Dates: 5–12 March 2009
- Teams: 8

Final positions
- Champions: England (1st title)
- Runners-up: Canada
- Third place: France
- Fourth place: New Zealand

Tournament statistics
- Top scorer(s): (Netherlands) Manon Melis (Canada) Christine Sinclair (4 goals)

The 2009 Cyprus Women's Cup was the second edition of the Cyprus Women's Cup, an invitational women's football tournament held annually in Cyprus. The tournament was won by England.

== Group stage ==
=== Group A ===
Team	Pld	W	D	L	GF	GA	GD	Pts
England	3	2	1	0	11	2	+9	7
France	3	2	1	0	7	4	+3	7
South Africa	3	1	0	2	4	9	−5	3
Scotland	3	0	0	3	0	7	−7	0

5 March 2009

South Africa	0–6	England
	Report	Williams 18'; Sanderson 19'; Smith 42'; Houghton 54'; Chapman 87', 91'

GSZ Stadium, Larnaca

5 March 2009

France	2–0	Scotland
Blanc 69'; Le Sommer 83'	Report

Ammochostos Stadium, Larnaca

7 March 2009

England	2–2	France
Carney 28'; Stoney 75'	Report	Franco 15'; Thomis 72'

Paralimni Stadium, Paralimni

7 March 2009

South Africa	2–0	Scotland
Matlou 75'; Ngwane 86' (pen.)	Report

GSP Stadium, Nicosia

10 March 2009

England	3–0	Scotland
Aluko 40'; Westwood 66'; Clarke 83'

GSZ Stadium, Larnaca

10 March 2009

France	3–2	South Africa
Le Sommer 10'; Nécib 79'; Franco 81'	Report	Matlou 86'; Esau 90+1'

Makario Stadium, Nicosia

=== Group B ===
Team	Pld	W	D	L	GF	GA	GD	Pts
Canada	3	2	1	0	5	2	+3	7
New Zealand	3	1	1	1	5	5	0	4
Netherlands	3	1	0	2	3	5	−2	3
Russia	3	1	0	2	5	6	−1	3

5 March 2009

Netherlands	2–1	Russia
Melis 34', 45'		Mokshanova 44' (pen.)

Makario Stadium, Nicosia

5 March 2009

Canada	1–1	New Zealand
Julien 11'		Hassett 34'

Paralimni Stadium, Paralimni

7 March 2009

Canada	2–1	Netherlands
Sinclair 15', 34'		Spitse 53'

GSZ Stadium, Larnaca

7 March 2009

Russia	4–2	New Zealand
Fomina 15', 23', 84'; Kozhnikova 35'		Percival 2'; Hearn 60' (pen.)

GSP Stadium, Nicosia

10 March 2009

Canada	2–0	Russia
Sinclair 70'; Tancredi 82'

Ammochostos Stadium, Larnaca

10 March 2009

New Zealand	2–0	Netherlands
Hearn 50' (pen.); Yallop 75'

Paralimni Stadium, Paralimni

== Knockout stage ==
=== Seventh place match ===
12 March 2009

Scotland	2–1	Russia
Grant 21'; Hamill 27'		Sochneva 44'

GSP Stadium, Nicosia

=== Fifth place match ===
12 March 2009

Netherlands	5–0	South Africa
Melis 2', 33'; Smit 30' van de Sanden 78' de Ridder 83'

GSP Stadium, Nicosia

=== Third place match ===
12 March 2009

France	1–1	New Zealand
Herbert 88'	Report	Yallop 33'
Penalties
Franco (penalty scored); Pizzala (penalty missed); Diguelman (penalty scored); Soubeyrand (penalty scored); Le Sommer (penalty scored); Viguier (penalty scored); Bouhaddi (penalty scored)	6–5	(penalty missed) Smith; (penalty scored) Yallop; (penalty scored) White; (penalty scored) McLaughlin; (penalty scored) Oostdam; (penalty scored) Percival; (penalty missed) Riley

GSP Stadium, Nicosia

=== Final ===
12 March 2009

England	3–1	Canada
Sanderson 32'; Smith 40'; Williams 45'	Report	Sinclair 14'

GSP Stadium, Nicosia

== Champion ==
2009 Cyprus Cup

England
First title
