= 1993 CONCACAF Women's Invitational Tournament =

Tournament details
- Host country: United States
- Dates: August 4–8
- Teams: 4 (from 2 confederations)
- Venue: 1 (in 1 host city)

Final positions
- Champions: United States (2nd title)
- Runners-up: New Zealand
- Third place: Canada
- Fourth place: Trinidad and Tobago

Tournament statistics
- Matches played: 6
- Goals scored: 24 (4 per match)

The 1993 CONCACAF Women's Invitational Tournament was the second edition of the CONCACAF Women's Championship, a tournament of the Confederation of North, Central American and Caribbean Association Football. The tournament took place in Long Island, New York, United States from August 4–8, 1993, and consisted of 4 teams, one of whom, New Zealand, was an invited guest.

== Final round ==
Team	Pts	Pld	W	D	L	GF	GA
United States	9	3	3	0	0	13	0
New Zealand	4	3	1	1	1	7	3
Canada	4	3	1	1	1	4	1
Trinidad and Tobago	0	3	0	0	3	0	20

August 4, 1993

Canada	4–0	Trinidad and Tobago
Burtini 20'; Vamos 40', 50'; Hooper 79'	Report

New Hyde Park, United States
Attendance: 1027

August 4, 1993

United States	3–0	New Zealand
Lilly (?); Jennings (?); Rafanelli (?)	Report

New Hyde Park, United States
Attendance: 1300

August 6, 1993

Canada	0–0	New Zealand
	Report

New Hyde Park, United States
Attendance: 500

August 6, 1993

United States	9–0	Trinidad and Tobago
Fawcett (?); Lilly (?); Venturini (?); Jennings (?); Kaufman (?); Akers (?); Rafanelli (?) ? (?)	Report

New Hyde Park, United States
Attendance: 458

August 8, 1993

New Zealand	7–0	Trinidad and Tobago

New Hyde Park, United States

August 8, 1993

United States	1–0	Canada
Fawcett 29'	Retrospective

New Hyde Park, United States
Attendance: 1637

== Awards ==
1993 CONCACAF's Women's Championship winners

United States
Second title
