= 1994 CONCACAF Women's Championship =

Coupe des nations féminine de la CONCACAF 1994

Tournament details
- Host country: Canada
- Dates: 13–21 August
- Teams: 5 (from 1 confederation)
- Venue: 1 (in 1 host city)

Final positions
- Champions: United States (3rd title)
- Runners-up: Canada
- Third place: Mexico
- Fourth place: Trinidad and Tobago

Tournament statistics
- Matches played: 10
- Goals scored: 68 (6.8 per match)

The 1994 CONCACAF Women's Championship was the third staging of the CONCACAF's Women's Championship. It determined the CONCACAF's two qualifiers for the FIFA Women's World Cup 1995 — the winner the United States and the runner-up Canada. The tournament took place in Montreal, Quebec, Canada between August 13 and 21, 1994, and consisted of five teams.

== Venues ==
Montreal
Complexe sportif Claude-Robillard
Capacity: 6,500
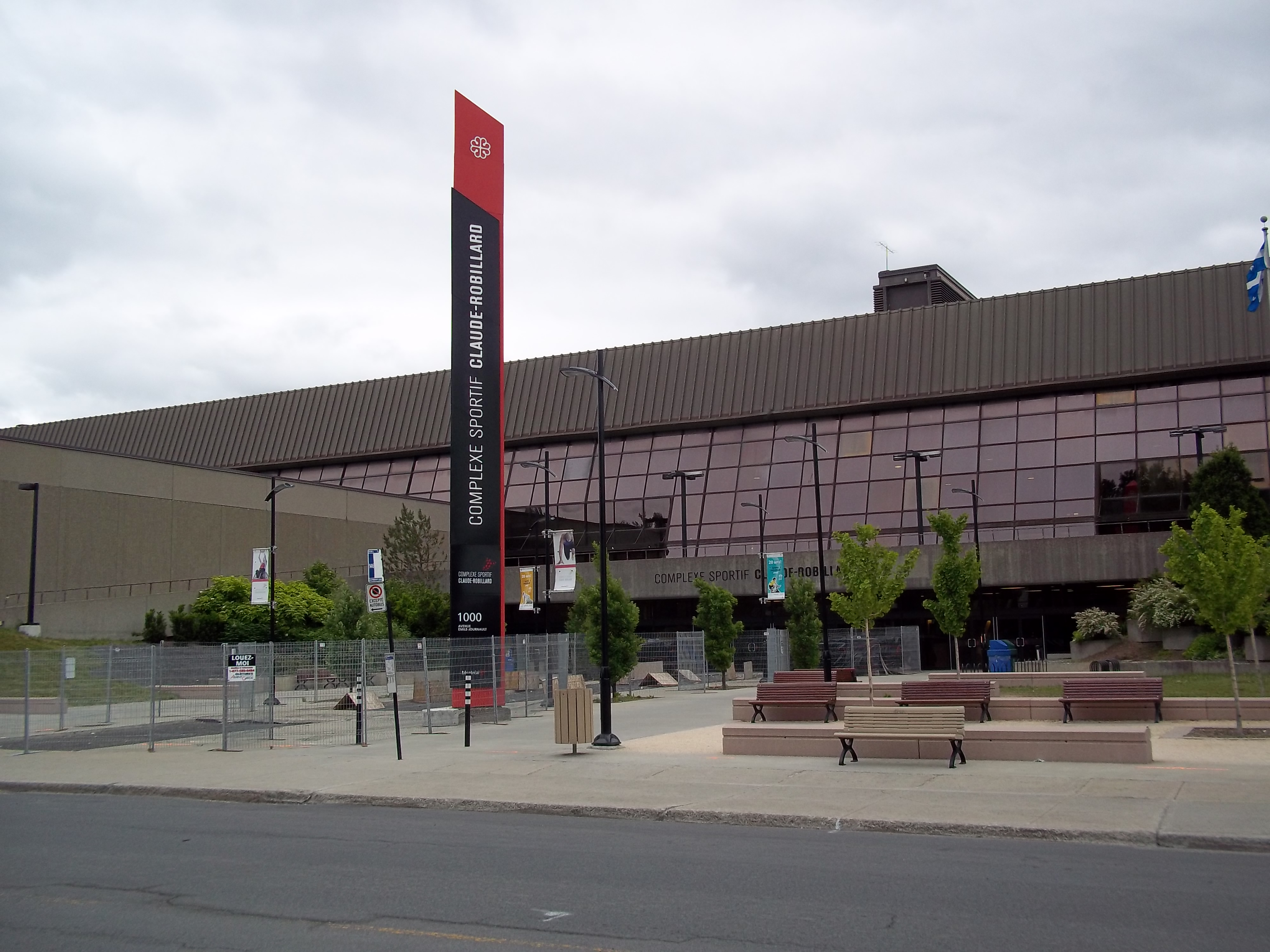

== Final round ==
Team	Pts	Pld	W	D	L	GF	GA
United States	12	4	4	0	0	36	1
Canada	9	4	3	0	1	18	6
Mexico	4	4	1	1	2	6	19
Trinidad and Tobago	4	4	1	1	2	6	20
Jamaica	0	4	0	0	4	2	22

August 13, 1994

Canada	7–0	Jamaica
Hooper 2', 67', 78'; Burtini 26', 28'; Donnelly 65'; Neil 87'	Report

Complexe sportif Claude-Robillard
Montreal, Canada
Attendance: 1821

August 13, 1994

United States	9–0	Mexico
Lilly (?); Venturini (?); Lalor (?); Roberts (?); Jennings (?); Hamm (?); Akers (?)	Report

Complexe sportif Claude-Robillard
Montreal, Canada
Attendance: 1821

August 15, 1994

Trinidad and Tobago	2–1	Jamaica

Canada

August 15, 1994

Canada	6–0	Mexico
Burtini 19', 27', 44', 60', 75'; Hooper 33'	Report

Complexe sportif Claude-Robillard
Montreal, Canada
Attendance: 1256

August 17, 1994

Mexico	3–1	Jamaica

Canada

August 17, 1994

United States	11–1	Trinidad and Tobago
Hamm 4' (?); Cromwell (?); Venturini (?); Lilly (?); Jennings (?); Akers (?)	Report; Report; Report	DeSilva (?)

Complexe sportif Claude-Robillard
Montreal, Canada
Attendance: 1900

August 19, 1994

United States	10–0	Jamaica
Overbeck (?); Roberts (?); Lilly (?); Jennings (?); Rafanelli (?); Akers (?); Milbrett (?)	Report

Complexe sportif Claude-Robillard
Montreal, Canada
Attendance: 1087

August 19, 1994

Canada	5–0	Trinidad and Tobago
Ring 41'; Burtini 70'; Neil 75'; Hooper 77', 90'	Report

Complexe sportif Claude-Robillard
Montreal, Canada
Attendance: 1355

August 21, 1994

Mexico	3–3	Trinidad and Tobago

Canada

August 21, 1994

Canada	0–6	United States
	Report	Hamm 17'; Neil 55' (o.g.); Roberts 56'; Jennings 80'; Foudy 87'; Akers 89'

Complexe sportif Claude-Robillard
Montreal, Canada
Attendance: 2610

== Awards ==
1994 CONCACAF's Women's Championship winners

United States
Third title
