= Kendra Flock =

Canadian association football player (born 1985)

Personal information
- Date of birth: 5 September 1985 (age 41)
- Place of birth: Calgary, Alberta, Canada
- Height: 5 ft 7 in (1.70 m)
- Position: Forward

Youth career
- Western Canada High School

College career
Years	Team	Apps	(Gls)
2004	UCF Knights	23	(17)

Senior career*
Years	Team	Apps	(Gls)
2010	Vancouver Whitecaps		
2011	Victoria Highlanders		
2011	Falköpings KIK	7	(4)

International career
2010	Canada	2	(1)
- * Club domestic league appearances and goals as of 14 December 2019

Kendra Flock (born September 5, 1985) is a former Canadian soccer player who last played as a forward for Falköpings KIK at the Swedish Elitettan.

== Life and career ==
Flock was born in Calgary, Alberta, and started playing soccer at the age of five at the Calgary Elbow Park. She played one season for the University of Central Florida where she started in all the team's season matches and led them in points.

In 2010, she played for the Vancouver Whitecaps and moved to the Victoria Highlanders in 2011.

Professionally, Flock played for Falköpings KIK in Sweden where she scored 4 goals in 7 matches.

Internationally, Flock represented Canada at the 2010 Cyprus Women's Cup where she played two matches and scored one goal.
