= Carolina Pini =

Italian footballer (born 1988)

Personal information
- Date of birth: 13 June 1988 (age 38)
- Place of birth: Florence, Italy
- Height: 1.70 m (5 ft 7 in)
- Position: Midfielder

Senior career*
Years	Team	Apps	(Gls)
2002–2003	Firenze	10	(4)
2003–2007	Agliana	91	(7)
2007–2011	Bayern Munich	10	(1)
2011–2013	Bardolino		

International career
2005	Italy U19		
2006–	Italy		
- * Club domestic league appearances and goals

Carolina Pini (born 13 June 1988) is an Italian footballer who most recently played as a midfielder for ASDCF Bardolino and the Italian national team.

== Career ==
Pini began playing football as a kid. Her first team was Floriagafir (together with boys), when 12 years old, she went to ACF Firenze where she stayed two years. Then she played in Agliana for four years, in 2007 she went to the women team of Bayern Munich. After spending four seasons in the Frauen-Bundesliga in 2011 she returned to the Serie A, signing for ASDCF Bardolino.

In 2013 Pini did not extend her deal with Bardolino and left the club.

== International career ==
Pini played in the juvenile Italian national team ("under 19", first match in January 2005 vs Portugal), since 2006 she has been playing for the Italian national team, her first game being a 7-0 win against Serbia Montenegro. On 2 October 2010, he scored against Ukraine for the FIFA Women's World Cup qualification at the Stadion Yuri Gagarin in Chernihiv.
