= Michelle Ring =

Canadian soccer player

Mitch Ring
Personal information
- Full name: Michelle Ring-Passant
- Date of birth: 28 November 1967 (age 58)
- Place of birth: Calgary, Alberta, Canada
- Height: 1.68 m (5 ft 6 in)
- Position: Defender

Youth career
- 1981–1985: Mouat Hawks
- 1985–1989: UBC Thunderbirds

Senior career*
Years	Team	Apps	(Gls)
1989–1993	Surrey Marlins		

International career^{‡}
1986–1995	Canada	45	(2)
- * Club domestic league appearances and goals ‡ National team caps and goals as of 11/24/2019

Michelle Ring (born 28 November 1967) is a Canadian soccer player who played as a defender for the Canada women's national soccer team. She was part of the team at the 1995 FIFA Women's World Cup. In 2005, she was inducted into the Canadian Soccer Hall of Fame.

== International goals ==
No.	Date	Venue	Opponent	Score	Result	Competition
1.	19 August 1994	Montreal, Canada	Trinidad and Tobago	1–0	5–0	1994 CONCACAF Women's Championship
2.	11 May 1995	Burnaby, Canada	Australia	1–0	3–0	Friendly
