= Christina Kaufman =

American soccer player (born 1964)

Personal information
- Full name: Christina Kaufman
- Birth name: Christina Van Leeuwen
- Date of birth: December 7, 1964 (age 61)
- Place of birth: United States
- Height: 5 ft 5 in (1.65 m)
- Position: Forward

College career
Years	Team	Apps	(Gls)
1985–198?	San Diego State Aztecs		

Senior career*
Years	Team	Apps	(Gls)
1993	Southern California Ajax		
1995	Cal South Soccer		

International career
1993	United States	2	(1)
- * Club domestic league appearances and goals

Christina Kaufman (née Van Leeuwen; born December 7, 1964) is an American former soccer player who played as a forward, making two appearances for the United States women's national team.

== Career ==
In college, Kaufman played soccer for the San Diego State Aztecs, beginning in the 1985 and 1986 seasons. However, at the time it was only a club sport at San Diego. In club soccer, she played for Southern California Ajax of Manhattan Beach, California in the 1990s, including the 1993 season where the team won the Region IV amateur championship and the USASA National Women's Amateur. In the regional final, Ajax won 3–1 over the Sacramento Storm to qualify for the national championship. At the championship in Indianapolis, Kaufman scored five of the team's eleven goals in the two-match tournament. Ajax beat the Florida Comets 7–2 in the final on July 18, 1993, with Kaufman subsequently named the tournament's most valuable player. She also played for Cal South Soccer, including the 1995 season where the team won the Region IV title. In the final against Oregon, Kaufman scored twice in a 3–0 win.

Kaufman made her international debut for the United States on August 4, 1993, in a friendly match against New Zealand. She earned her second and final cap two days later in a friendly match against Trinidad and Tobago, and scored one goal in the 9–0 win.

== Personal life ==
Kaufman attended California State University, Sacramento from 1983 to 1985, before attending San Diego State University from 1985 to 1988. She serves as the garden coordinator at Sacramento Country Day School, and has two children.

== Career statistics ==
=== International ===
United States
Year	Apps	Goals
1993	2	1
Total	2	1

=== International goals ===
No.	Date	Location	Opponent	Result	Competition
1	August 6, 1993	New Hyde Park, New York, United States	Trinidad and Tobago	9–0	Friendly
