= Cathy Ross (soccer) =

Canadian soccer player

Personal information
- Date of birth: 19 November 1967 (age 58)
- Place of birth: New Westminster, British Columbia, Canada
- Height: 1.75 m (5 ft 9 in)
- Position: Defender

International career
Years	Team	Apps	(Gls)
1986–1995	Canada	34	(3)

Cathy Ross (born 19 November 1967) is a Canadian soccer player who played as a defender for the Canada women's national soccer team. She was part of the team at the 1995 FIFA Women's World Cup.

== Honours ==
- 2021: Canada Soccer Hall of Fame
