= Breanna Boyd =

Retired Canadian soccer player

Personal information
- Date of birth: 10 June 1981 (age 45)
- Place of birth: Edmonton, Alberta, Canada
- Height: 1.72 m (5 ft 8 in)
- Position: Defender

Youth career
- Foothills Panthers

College career
Years	Team	Apps	(Gls)
1999–2002	Nebraska Cornhuskers	93	(12)

Senior career*
Years	Team	Apps	(Gls)
2003	Carolina Courage	16	(0)

International career
2000–2003	Canada	43	(2)
- * Club domestic league appearances and goals

Breanna Boyd (born 10 June 1981) is a retired Canadian soccer player who played for Carolina Courage and the Canadian women's soccer team.

== Early life and education ==
Boyd was born in Edmonton on 10 June 1981. She comes from a family of athletes: Barry and Carol competed for the Canadian National Track and Field Team; her stepfather, Tony Meibock, competed as a Canadian speed skater in the 1992 Winter Olympics; and her grandfather was English decathlete Geoff Elliott. She and her two siblings were raised in Calgary.

Boyd attended Sir Winston Churchill High School, which did not have a soccer team; however, Boyd played for the school's volleyball and field hockey teams. She also played for the Foothills Panthers soccer club, as well as the Alberta Provincial Team, where she received national titles three years in a row.

In 2006, she graduated from the University of Nebraska–Lincoln, where she studied biological sciences.

== Career ==
=== University ===
Boyd played for the University of Nebraska–Lincoln's soccer team from 1999 to 2002.

=== Professional ===
In 2003, Boyd was drafted in the first round by the Carolina Courage, a Women's United Soccer Association's team.

=== International ===
From 1998 to 2001, Body was a member of the Canadian Under-21 National Team. In 1999, she played at the XIII Pan American Games Winnipeg, where she finished fourth.

In 2000, she was selected for the Canadian women's soccer team, playing until 2003. In 2000, the placed fourth at the 2000 CONCACAF Women's Gold Cup, then came in second two years later. Boyd was chosen to represent Canada at the 2003 FIFA Women's World Cup, though she couldn't participate due to ongoing effects from a concussion.
