= Michele Houchen =

Canadian soccer player

Personal information
- Full name: Michele Houchen
- Date of birth: September 23, 1965 (age 61)
- Place of birth: Toronto, Ontario, Canada
- Height: 1.63 m (5 ft 4 in)
- Position: Striker

Youth career
- Oakville SC

International career
Years	Team	Apps	(Gls)
1987	Canada	5	(2)

Michele Houchen (born September 23, 1965) is a Canadian retired soccer player who played as a striker. She made five appearances and scored two goals for the Canada national team. She currently serves as the Girls Junior Academy head coach for Blue Devils FC.

== Early life and career ==
Houchen was born in Toronto, Ontario in 1965, and raised in Scarborough. She began playing soccer at the age of 15. In 1985, she moved with her family to Oakville, Ontario, where she joined the Oakville Soccer Club. In 1986, she won the Canada Soccer Women's All-Star Championship.

== International career ==
In July 1986, Houchen was one of the 23 players selected to participate in the first-ever Canada national team camp in Winnipeg, Manitoba. On July 15, 1987, at the age of 21, she made her debut for the national team in a 2–0 friendly loss to Sweden at the National Sports Center in Blaine, Minnesota. Later that year, she made the roster for the 1987 Women's World Invitational Tournament in Taiwan. On December 11, she scored twice in a 2–0 win over Hong Kong in Kaohsiung City. On December 19, she made her 5th and final national team appearance, in a 4–0 loss to the United States in Taipei. Houchen was part of the national team player pool for a total of five years, from 1986 to 1991.

== Later life and coaching career ==
In 2002, Houchen was player-coach for the Oakville Storm, a team part of the Oakville Soccer Club, and helped them win both the Ontario Women's Cup and the Jubilee Trophy. In 2004, she was named as an assistant coach for the Ontario provincial team, and the team went on to win gold at the National All-Star Championship. In 2005, she was player-coach for the Oakville Panthers as they won gold at the World Masters Games, in the age 38–44 category.

In 2015, Houchen founded Future Girls Soccer, an all-girls soccer academy based in Oakville. As of 2022, she serves as the Girls Junior Academy head coach for Blue Devils FC. Before joining the Blue Devils, she was a development director with Oakville SC.

== Personal life ==
Houchen attended Sheridan College. She is an insurance broker. In 2007, she was inducted into the Oakville Sports Hall of Fame.

== Career statistics ==
=== International ===
Appearances and goals by national team and year
National team	Year	Apps	Goals
Canada
Canada	1987	5	2
Total		5	2

Scores and results list Canada's goal tally first, score column indicates score after each Houchen goal.

List of international goals scored by Michele Houchen
No.	Date	Venue	Opponent	Score	Result	Competition
1	December 11, 1987	Kaohsiung City, Taiwan	Hong Kong	1–0	2–0	1987 Women's World Invitational Tournament
2	December 11, 1987	Kaohsiung City, Taiwan	Hong Kong	2–0	2–0	1987 Women's World Invitational Tournament

== Honours ==
=== Club ===
Oakville SC

- Ontario Women's Cup: 1987, 1989, 1990, 1992, 2002
- Jubilee Trophy: 2002
