= Silvana Burtini =

Canadian soccer player

Personal information
- Date of birth: May 10, 1969 (age 57)
- Place of birth: Williams Lake, British Columbia, Canada
- Height: 1.70 m (5 ft 7 in)
- Position: Forward

College career
Years	Team	Apps	(Gls)
1992	Capilano Blues	9	(14)

Senior career*
Years	Team	Apps	(Gls)
1999–2000	Raleigh Wings		
2001	Carolina Courage	17	(4)

International career
1987–2003	Canada	77	(38)
- * Club domestic league appearances and goals

Silvana Burtini (born May 10, 1969) is a Canadian former soccer player. A forward, she represented Canada at the 1995, 1999 and 2003 editions of the FIFA Women's World Cup. In 1998 Burtini was named Canadian Player of the Year and was part of the Canadian squad who won the CONCACAF Women's Championship. She has scored the third-most goals in Team Canada Women's Soccer history, with 38 in 77 games.

At Capilano College, Burtini was BCCAA Player of the Year and a CCAA All-Canadian in 1992–93.

As a member of the Vancouver Police Department, Burtini was presented with the British Columbia Police Award of Valour for saving a life in 2004.

== International goals ==
No.	Date	Venue	Opponent	Score	Result	Competition
1.	4 August 1993	New Hyde Park, United States	Trinidad and Tobago	1–0	4–0	1993 CONCACAF Women's Invitational Tournament
2.	12 April 1994	Milford, Trinidad and Tobago	Trinidad and Tobago	1–0	2–0	Friendly
3.	13 August 1994	Montreal, Canada	Jamaica	2–0	7–0	1994 CONCACAF Women's Championship
4.	13 August 1994	Montreal, Canada	Jamaica	3–0	7–0	1994 CONCACAF Women's Championship
5.	15 August 1994	Montreal, Canada	Mexico	1–0	6–0	1994 CONCACAF Women's Championship
6.	15 August 1994	Montreal, Canada	Mexico	2–0	6–0	1994 CONCACAF Women's Championship
7.	15 August 1994	Montreal, Canada	Mexico	4–0	6–0	1994 CONCACAF Women's Championship
8.	15 August 1994	Montreal, Canada	Mexico	5–0	6–0	1994 CONCACAF Women's Championship
9.	15 August 1994	Montreal, Canada	Mexico	6–0	6–0	1994 CONCACAF Women's Championship
10.	19 August 1994	Montreal, Canada	Trinidad and Tobago	2–0	5–0	1994 CONCACAF Women's Championship
11.	8 June 1995	Helsingborg, Sweden	Nigeria	1–0	3–3	1995 FIFA Women's World Cup
12.	8 June 1995	Helsingborg, Sweden	Nigeria	3–1	3–3	1995 FIFA Women's World Cup
13.	7 June 1997	Oakford, United States	Australia	2–2	2–3	1997 Women's U.S. Cup
14.	28 August 1998	Toronto, Canada	Puerto Rico	1–0	21–0	1998 CONCACAF Women's Championship
15.	28 August 1998	Toronto, Canada	Puerto Rico	2–0	21–0	1998 CONCACAF Women's Championship
16.	28 August 1998	Toronto, Canada	Puerto Rico	3–0	21–0	1998 CONCACAF Women's Championship
17.	28 August 1998	Toronto, Canada	Puerto Rico	5–0	21–0	1998 CONCACAF Women's Championship
18.	28 August 1998	Toronto, Canada	Puerto Rico	8–0	21–0	1998 CONCACAF Women's Championship
19.	28 August 1998	Toronto, Canada	Puerto Rico	9–0	21–0	1998 CONCACAF Women's Championship
20.	28 August 1998	Toronto, Canada	Puerto Rico	12–0	21–0	1998 CONCACAF Women's Championship
21.	28 August 1998	Toronto, Canada	Puerto Rico	13–0	21–0	1998 CONCACAF Women's Championship
22.	30 August 1998	Toronto, Canada	Martinique	1–0	14–0	1998 CONCACAF Women's Championship
23.	30 August 1998	Toronto, Canada	Martinique	2–0	14–0	1998 CONCACAF Women's Championship
24.	30 August 1998	Toronto, Canada	Martinique	4–0	14–0	1998 CONCACAF Women's Championship
25.	1 September 1998	Toronto, Canada	Guatemala	2–0	4–0	1998 CONCACAF Women's Championship
26.	1 September 1998	Toronto, Canada	Guatemala	3–0	4–0	1998 CONCACAF Women's Championship
27.	1 September 1998	Toronto, Canada	Guatemala	4–0	4–0	1998 CONCACAF Women's Championship
28.	21 May 1999	Vancouver, Canada	Mexico	2–0	3–0	Friendly
29.	19 June 1999	San Jose, United States	Japan	1–0	1–1	1999 FIFA Women's World Cup
30.	4 June 2000	Campbelltown, Australia	Australia	2–0	2–0	2000 Pacific Cup
31.	10 June 2000	Newscastle, Australia	Japan	2–?	5–1	2000 Pacific Cup
32.	10 June 2000	Newscastle, Australia	Japan	3–?	5–1	2000 Pacific Cup
33.	11 November 2000	Columbus, United States	United States	3–?	3–1	Friendly
34.	10 February 2001	Rabat, Morocco	Morocco	1–0	4–0	Friendly
35.	30 October 2002	Victoria, Canada	Haiti	2–0	11–1	2002 CONCACAF Women's Gold Cup
36.	30 October 2002	Victoria, Canada	Haiti	10–1	11–1	2002 CONCACAF Women's Gold Cup
37.	20 March 2003	Vila Real de Santo António, Portugal	Greece	5–0	7–1	2003 Algarve Cup
