= Jonelle Filigno =

Canadian soccer player (born 1990)

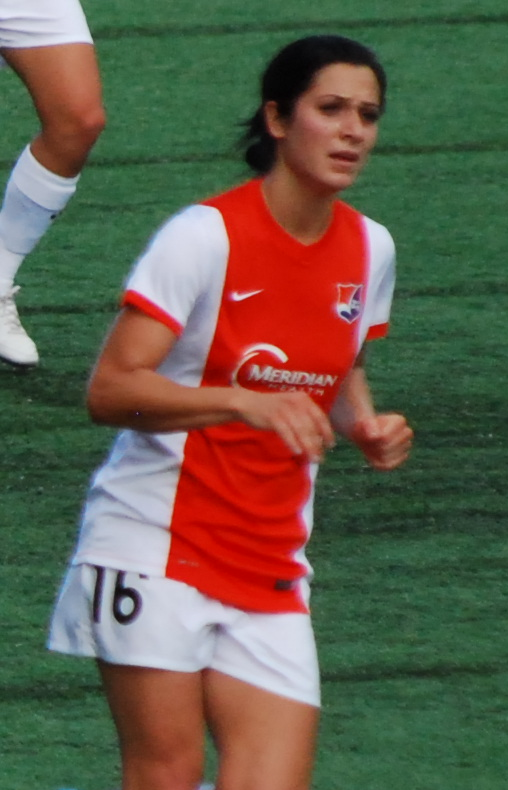

Personal information
- Full name: Jonelle Filigno
- Date of birth: September 24, 1990 (age 36)
- Place of birth: Mississauga, Ontario, Canada
- Height: 1.68 m (5 ft 6 in)
- Positions: Attacking midfielder; forward

College career
Years	Team	Apps	(Gls)
2010–2013	Rutgers Scarlet Knights	63	(33)

Senior career*
Years	Team	Apps	(Gls)
2008	Vancouver Whitecaps FC	2	(2)
2010	Toronto Lady Lynx	6	(1)
2014–2015	Sky Blue FC	22	(1)

International career
2006–2008	Canada U-20	8	(5)
2008–2015	Canada	71	(11)
Medal record
Olympic Games
Bronze medal – third place	2012 London	Team
- * Club domestic league appearances and goals as of December 20, 2015

Jonelle Filigno (born September 24, 1990) is a retired Canadian soccer player who last played for Sky Blue FC in the National Women's Soccer League. She played for the Canadian national team, with whom she won an Olympic bronze medal at London 2012.

== College career ==
Filigno attended Rutgers University, where she is the all-time leading scorer of game-winning goals, with 17. She joined Rutgers on the advice of her former teammate Karina Leblanc, who at that time served as an assistant coach with the Scarlet Knights. In 2020, she was inducted into the Rutgers Athletics Hall of Fame, with the school describing her as "one of the most accomplished players in school history."

== Club career ==
After finishing her collegiate career at Rutgers University, Filigno was allocated to NWSL side Sky Blue FC. She made her debut on April 27, 2014, as a second-half substitute in a 3–2 road defeat to the Boston Breakers at Harvard Stadium. She scored her first professional goal in a 3–3 draw against the Washington Spirit on May 21, 2014, at Maryland SoccerPlex.

== International career ==
Filigno won gold with Canada in the 2008 CONCACAF Women's Under-20 Championship. She made her senior debut for Canada on January 16, 2008, at an age of 17, playing in a 4-0 loss against the United States in the Four Nations Tournament.

Filigno was part of the squad which won gold at the 2008 Cyprus Women's Cup. She played for Canada at the 2008 Olympics and 2011 FIFA Women's World Cup. She was described in the media in the lead up to the 2011 World Cup as "Possessing a keen attacking sense, fearlessness in taking on defenders and strong movement off the ball".

At the 2012 Olympics, Filigno scored the winning goal against Great Britain in the knockout stage of the tournament, a stunning volley from a Sophie Schmidt corner kick. She was subsequently awarded an Olympic bronze medal after Canada defeated France in the Third Place match. The medal was Canada's first in women's soccer at the Olympics.

Filigno made her last appearance for the national team at the 2015 FIFA Women's World Cup and officially retired from international soccer in 2017, being honoured at a match alongside Josée Bélanger, Robyn Gayle, Kaylyn Kyle, and Lauren Sesselmann.

== Personal life ==
Filigno's father was born in Etobicoke, Ontario while her mother is from Georgetown, Guyana. Filigno was four years old when she started playing soccer in north Mississauga. She grew up participating in soccer, basketball, volleyball, and cross-country running.

== International goals ==
Key (expand for notes on "international goals" and sorting)
Location	Geographic location of the venue where the competition occurred Sorted by country name first, then by city name
Lineup	Start – played entire match on minute (off player) – substituted on at the minute indicated, and player was substituted off at the same time off minute (on player) – substituted off at the minute indicated, and player was substituted on at the same time (c) – captain Sorted by minutes played
Goal in match	Goal of total goals by the player in the match Sorted by total goals followed by goal number
#	NumberOfGoals.goalNumber scored by the player in the match (alternate notation to Goal in match)
Min	The minute in the match the goal was scored. For list that include caps, blank indicates played in the match but did not score a goal.
Assist/pass	The ball was passed by the player, which assisted in scoring the goal. This column depends on the availability and source of this information.
penalty or pk	Goal scored on penalty-kick which was awarded due to foul by opponent. (Goals scored in penalty-shoot-out, at the end of a tied match after extra-time, are not included.)
Score	The match score after the goal was scored. Sorted by goal difference, then by goal scored by the player's team
Result	The final score. Sorted by goal difference in the match, then by goal difference in penalty-shoot-out if it is taken, followed by goal scored by the player's team in the match, then by goal scored in the penalty-shoot-out. For matches with identical final scores, match ending in extra-time without penalty-shoot-out is a tougher match, therefore precede matches that ended in regulation
aet	The score at the end of extra-time; the match was tied at the end of 90' regulation
pso	Penalty-shoot-out score shown in parentheses; the match was tied at the end of extra-time
	Green background color – exhibition or closed door international friendly match
	Red background color – Olympic women's football qualification match
	Light-blue background color – FIFA women's world cup qualification match
	Orange background color – Continental Games or regional tournament
	Pink background color – Olympic women's football tournament
NOTE on background colors: Continental Games or regional tournament are sometimes also qualifier for World Cup or Olympics; information depends on the source such as the player's federation. NOTE: some keys may not apply for a particular football player

	Date	Location	Opponent	Lineup	#	Min	Score	Result	Competition
1	2008-04-02	Ciudad Juarez	Trinidad and Tobago	Start	1.1	21	2–0	6–0	Olympic Qualifier
2	2010-10-31	Cancún	Guyana	on 39' (off Julien)	2.1	47	3–0	8–0	World Cup Qualifier
3	2010-10-31	Cancún	Guyana	on 39' (off Julien)	2.2	76	7–0	8–0	World Cup Qualifier
4	2010-11-02	Cancún	Mexico	on 54' (off Tancredi)	1.1	67	3–0	3–0	World Cup Qualifier
5	2010-11-05	Cancún	Costa Rica	off 80' (on Lang)	1.1	72	2–0	4–0	World Cup Qualifier
6	2011-03-04	Nicosia	Italy	off 86' (on Julien)	1.1	26	1–0	1–0	Cyprus Women's Cup
7	2011-03-09	Paralimni	Netherlands	off 107' (on Julien)	1.1	20	1–0	2–1 aet	Cyprus Women's Cup
8	2011-06-14	Rome	North Korea	off 45' (on Scott)	1.1	40	2–0	2–0	Friendly
9	2012-08-03	Coventry	Great Britain	off 61' (on Kyle)	1.1	12	1–0	2–0	Olympic Tournament
10	2013-03-08	Nicosia	Finland	off 61' (on Timko)	1.1	30	1–1	2–1	Cyprus Women's Cup
11	2014-11-24	Los Angeles	Sweden	off 80' (on Baxter)	1.1	44	1–0	1–0	Friendly (closed door)

== Honours ==
International

- CONCACAF Women's Championship: 2010
- Cyprus Women's Cup: 2008

Individual

- Rutgers Athletics Hall of Fame: 2020
- Canada U-20 Player of the Year: 2008, 2010
