= Shannon Rosenow =

Canadian soccer player

Personal information
- Date of birth: 20 June 1972 (age 54)
- Place of birth: Edmonton, Alberta, Canada
- Height: 1.63 m (5 ft 4 in)
- Position: Forward

International career^{‡}
Years	Team	Apps	(Gls)
1996–2000	Canada	27	(11)
- ‡ National team caps and goals as of 19 June 1999 (before the 1999 FIFA Women's World Cup)

Shannon Rosenow (born 20 June 1972) is a Canadian soccer player who played as a forward for the Canada women's national football team. She was part of the team at the 1999 FIFA Women's World Cup.
