= Lene Jensen =

Danish footballer (born 1976)

Personal information
- Full name: Lene Revsbeck Jensen
- Date of birth: 17 March 1976 (age 50)
- Place of birth: Denmark
- Position: Forward

Senior career*
Years	Team	Apps	(Gls)
–2002	HEI		
2002–2005	IK Skovbakken		
2005–2006	Silkeborg IF		
2006–2011	Brøndby IF	107	(41)

International career^{‡}
1992	Denmark U17	6	(4)
1993–1997	Denmark U21	29	(13)
1996–2010	Denmark	109	(30)
- * Club domestic league appearances and goals ‡ National team caps and goals as of 6 February 2012

Lene Revsbeck Jensen (born 17 March 1976) is a Danish former football forward. She played for Brøndby IF and the Denmark women's national football team.

Between 2006 and 2011 Jensen scored 52 goals in 156 games across all competitions for Brøndby, placing her tenth in the club's all–time appearance list.

She made her senior Denmark debut in September 1996, entering play as a substitute in a 7–1 UEFA Women's Championship qualification play–off win in Portugal. She continued to be selected throughout the following decade, playing at the 1999 FIFA Women's World Cup as well as the UEFA Women's Championship in 2001 and 2005.

In June 2008 Jensen was recalled to the Denmark squad after a two–year absence for a UEFA Women's Euro 2009 qualifying match in Ukraine.
