= 2011 Cyprus Women's Cup =

Tournament details
- Host country: Cyprus
- Dates: 2 March – 9 March 2011
- Teams: 12 (from 4 confederations)
- Venue(s): 8 (in 4 host cities)

Final positions
- Champions: Canada (3rd title)
- Runners-up: Netherlands
- Third place: France
- Fourth place: Scotland

Tournament statistics
- Matches played: 24
- Goals scored: 68 (2.83 per match)
- Top scorer(s): (France) Marie-Laure Delie (6 goals)

The 2011 Cyprus Women's Cup was the fourth edition of the Cyprus Women's Cup, an invitational women's football tournament held annually in Cyprus.

== Format ==
The twelve invited teams were split into three groups that played a round-robin tournament. The main eight entrants were identical to the previous year.

Groups A and B, containing the strongest ranked teams, were the only ones in contention to win the title. The group winners from A and B contested the final, with the runners-up playing for third place. The Group C winner faced the better 3rd place team from Groups A and B for 5th, with the Group C runner-up facing the other 3rd place team for 7th. Group C's 3rd place team faced the better 4th place team of Groups A and B, while the other two 4th place teams played in the 11th place match.

Points awarded in the group stage follow the standard formula of three points for a win, one point for a draw and zero points for a loss. In the case of two teams being tied on the same number of points in a group, their head-to-head result determined the higher place.

== Group stage ==
All times local (EET/UTC+2)

=== Group A ===
Team	Pld	W	D	L	GF	GA	GD	Pts
Canada	3	3	0	0	4	0	+4	9
Scotland	3	1	1	1	2	1	+1	4
England	3	1	0	2	2	4	−2	3
Italy	3	0	1	2	0	3	−3	1

Scotland's 2–0 victory against England was only their second win in the history of the fixture and their first since 1977.

2 March 2011
14:00

Canada	1−0	Scotland
Zurrer 70'

Ammochostos Stadium, Larnaca
2 March 2011
17:00

England	2–0	Italy
E.White 3'; K.Smith 38' (pen.)

Neo GSZ Stadium, Larnaca

4 March 2011
14:00

England	0−2	Scotland
		Little 26'; Beattie 52'

GSP Stadium, Nicosia
4 March 2011
17:00

Italy	0−1	Canada
		Filigno 33'

GSP Stadium, Nicosia

7 March 2011
17:00

Scotland	0−0	Italy

Neo GSZ Stadium, Larnaca
7 March 2011
17:00

Canada	2−0	England
Sinclair 45'; Timko 55'

GSP Stadium, Nicosia

=== Group B ===
Team	Pld	W	D	L	GF	GA	GD	Pts
Netherlands	3	3	0	0	12	2	+10	9
France	3	2	0	1	8	4	+4	6
New Zealand	3	1	0	2	5	10	−5	3
Switzerland	3	0	0	3	1	10	−9	0

2 March 2011
14:00

France	2−0	Switzerland
Thiney 23'; Abily 56'

GSP Stadium, Nicosia
2 March 2011
17:00

New Zealand	1−4	Netherlands
Gregorius 75'		Spitse 20'; Melis 23', 44'; Slegers 83'

GSP Stadium, Nicosia

4 March 2011
14:00

France	1−2	Netherlands
Abily 7'		Slegers 6'; Melis 73'

Ammochostos Stadium, Larnaca
4 March 2011
17:00

Switzerland	1−2	New Zealand
Maendly 83'		Yallop 38'; Hassett 41'

Neo GSZ Stadium, Larnaca

7 March 2011
14:00

Netherlands	6−0	Switzerland
Van de Ven 4', 7', 32'; De Ridder 49', 81'; Stein 51' (o.g.)

Ammochostos Stadium, Larnaca
7 March 2011
14:00

New Zealand	2−5	France
Dusang 6' (o.g.); Green 31'		Delie 16', 19', 82'; Le Sommer 25'; Bussaglia 84'

GSP Stadium, Nicosia

=== Group C ===
Team	Pld	W	D	L	GF	GA	GD	Pts
South Korea	3	2	1	0	6	3	+3	7
Mexico	3	1	2	0	4	2	+2	5
Russia	3	1	1	1	3	3	0	4
Northern Ireland	3	0	0	3	3	8	−5	0

2 March 2011
14:00

South Korea	3−1	Northern Ireland
Lee Se-eun 18', 33', 55'		Hutton

Koinotiko Sotiras, Sotira
2 March 2011
16:00

Russia	0−0	Mexico

Paralimni Stadium, Paralimni

4 March 2011
14:00

Russia	2−1	Northern Ireland
Skotnikova 41'; Fomina 52' (pen.)		Hutton 9'

Koinotiko Sotiras, Sotira
4 March 2011
16:00

South Korea	1−1	Mexico
Jeon Ga-eul 15'		Garza

Paralimni Stadium, Paralimni

7 March 2011
14:00

Mexico	3−1	Northern Ireland
Domínguez 33' (pen.); Corral 39'; Gandarilla 85'		Furness 56'

Koinotiko Sotiras, Sotira
7 March 2011
14:00

Russia	1−2	South Korea
Fomina 78' (pen.)		Ji So-yeon 7'; Yeo Min-ji 80'

Paralimni Stadium, Paralimni

== Placement play-offs ==
All times local (EET/UTC+2)

=== 11th Place ===
9 March 2011
12:00

Switzerland	2−1	Northern Ireland
Dickenmann 41'; Moser 65'		Furness 54'

Alpha Sports Centre, Larnaca

=== 9th Place ===
9 March 2011
12:00

Italy	2−0	Russia
Panico 45'; Domenichetti 62'

GSP Stadium, Nicosia

=== 7th Place ===
9 March 2011
12:00

New Zealand	0−5	Mexico
		Mayor 56', 56', 86'; Garza 78'; 83' (o.g.)

Paralimni Stadium, Paralimni

=== 5th Place ===
9 March 2011
14:00

England	2−0	South Korea
S. Smith 14', 80'

Dasaki Achna, Larnaca

=== 3rd Place ===
9 March 2011
14:00

Scotland	0−3	France
		Delie 30', 73', 85'

GSP Stadium, Nicosia

=== Final ===
9 March 2011
17:00

Canada	2−1 (a.e.t.)	Netherlands
Filigno 20'; Zurrer 99'		van den Heiligenberg 40'

Paralimni Stadium, Paralimni

== Champion ==
2011 Cyprus Cup

Canada
Third title
