= Jodi-Ann Robinson =

Soccer player (born 1989)

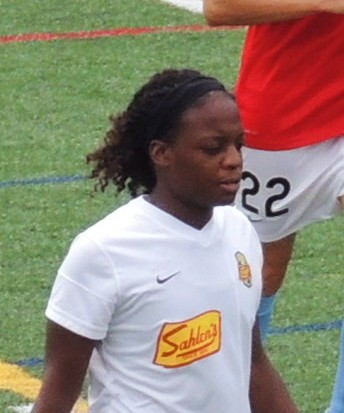
- Robinson with Western New York Flash in 2013

Personal information
- Full name: Jodi-Ann Robinson
- Date of birth: 17 April 1989 (age 37)
- Place of birth: Saint Ann's Bay, Jamaica
- Height: 5 ft 3 in (1.60 m)
- Position: Midfielder

Youth career
- Richmond SC
- –2005: Semiahmoo Spirit
- 2006: NTC BC

College career
Years	Team	Apps	(Gls)
2010	West Florida Argonauts	21	(20)

Senior career*
Years	Team	Apps	(Gls)
2005–2011	Vancouver Whitecaps		
2012–2013	Western New York Flash	13+	(1+)
2014	Kvarnsvedens IK	7	(4)
2015	Røa	3	(1)

International career
2004	Canada U19	8	(2)
2006–2008	Canada U20	11	(8)
2005–2013	Canada	56	(7)
- * Club domestic league appearances and goals

Jodi-Ann Robinson (born 17 April 1989) is a former soccer player who played as a midfielder. Born in Jamaica to Jamaican parents, she moved to Canada at age 8. She was naturalised there and subsequently opted to play internationally for the Canada women's national team.

She represented Canada at two FIFA Women's World Cup editions (2007 and 2011) and the 2008 Summer Olympics.

== Playing career ==
On 11 January 2013, Robinson joined the Western New York Flash as part of the NWSL Player Allocation for the inaugural season of the National Women's Soccer League.

== Honors ==
Western New York Flash

- NWSL Shield: 2013
