= Randee Hermus =

Canadian soccer player (born 1979)

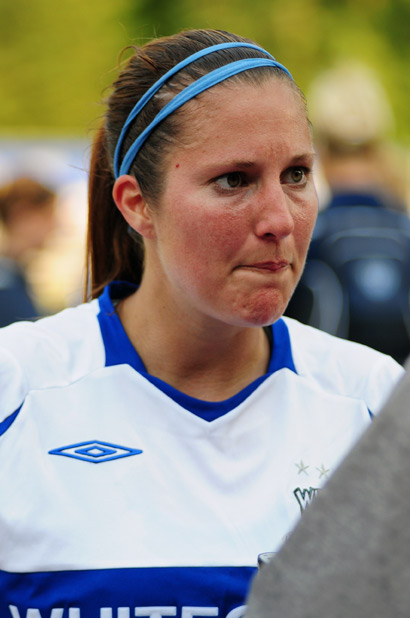

Personal information
- Full name: Randee Joanne Hermus
- Date of birth: November 14, 1979 (age 46)
- Place of birth: Surrey, British Columbia, Canada
- Height: 1.72 m (5 ft 8 in)
- Position: Forward

Youth career
- 1997–2000: Simon Fraser University

Senior career*
Years	Team	Apps	(Gls)
2001–2002	Vancouver Breakers		
2003	IF Fløya		
2004–2009	Vancouver Whitecaps		

International career
2000–2008	Canada	113	(12)
Medal record
Women's soccer
Representing Canada
Pan American Games
Bronze medal – third place	Rio de Janeiro	Team
- * Club domestic league appearances and goals

Randee Joanne Hermus (born November 14, 1979) is a Canadian former professional soccer defender, who won the bronze medal with the Canadian women's national soccer team at the 2007 Pan American Games. Born in Surrey, British Columbia, she played for the Vancouver Whitecaps.

== See also ==
- List of women's footballers with 100 or more international caps
