= Christina Julien =

Canadian women's soccer striker (born 1988)

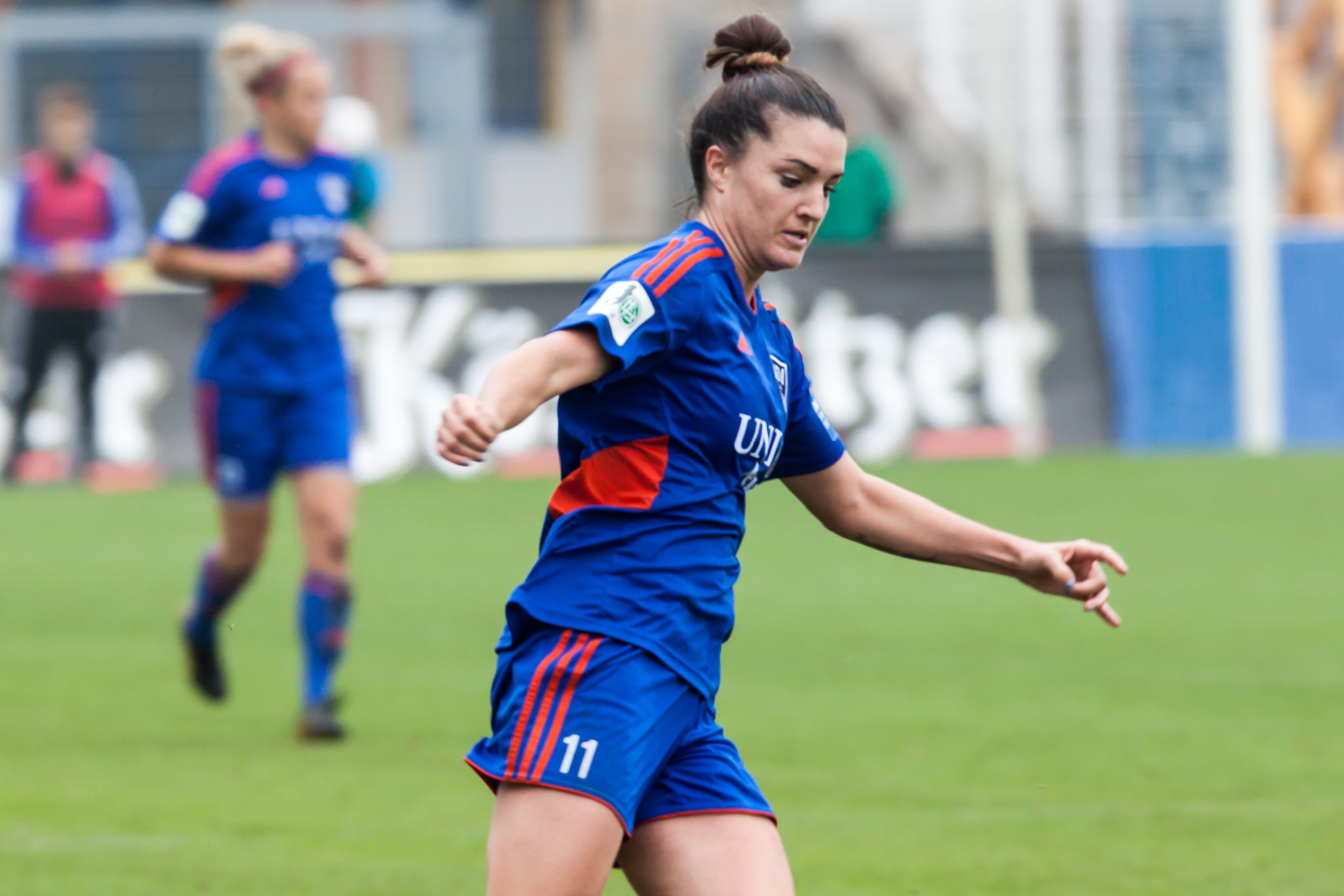
- Playing for FF USV Jena in 2014

Personal information
- Full name: Christina Marie Katrina Julien
- Born: 6 May 1988 (age 38) Williamstown, Ontario, Canada
- Height: 1.67 m (5 ft 6 in)
Association football career
- Position: Striker
College career
Years	Team	Apps	(Gls)
2006–2009	James Madison Dukes		
Senior career*
Years	Team	Apps	(Gls)
2007–2008	Ottawa Fury	20	(4)
2009	Laval Comets	12	(11)
2010–2011	Ottawa Fury	11	(4)
2012	Jitex	10	(1)
2013	Rossiyanka	7	(2)
2013–2014	Perth Glory	9	(2)
2014–2015	FF USV Jena	32	(8)
2015	1. FC Köln	11	(0)
International career
2009–2015	Canada	54	(10)
Medal record
Women's soccer
Representing Canada
Pan American Games
Gold medal – first place	2011 Guadalajara	Team
- * Club domestic league appearances and goals

Sport
Ice hockey career
- Position: Forward
- Shoots: Left
- AWIHL team: Melbourne Ice
- National team: Australia
- Playing career: 2016–present

Christina Marie Katrina Julien (born 6 May 1988 in Cornwall, Ontario) is a Canadian women's soccer plays who plays as a striker. She has played in the 2011 FIFA Women's World Cup and won a gold medal at the 2011 Pan American Games. Julien was named in the 2012 Olympic squad as an alternate player.

== Club career ==
Julien joined FF USV Jena for the 2014 season, and at the end of the season she left the club and joined 1. FC Köln.

== International goals ==
Key (expand for notes on "international goals" and sorting)
Location	Geographic location of the venue where the competition occurred Sorted by country name first, then by city name
Lineup	Start – played entire match on minute (off player) – substituted on at the minute indicated, and player was substituted off at the same time off minute (on player) – substituted off at the minute indicated, and player was substituted on at the same time (c) – captain Sorted by minutes played
#	NumberOfGoals.goalNumber scored by the player in the match (alternate notation to Goal in match)
Min	The minute in the match the goal was scored. For list that include caps, blank indicates played in the match but did not score a goal.
Assist/pass	The ball was passed by the player, which assisted in scoring the goal. This column depends on the availability and source of this information.
penalty or pk	Goal scored on penalty-kick which was awarded due to foul by opponent. (Goals scored in penalty-shoot-out, at the end of a tied match after extra-time, are not included.)
Score	The match score after the goal was scored. Sorted by goal difference, then by goal scored by the player's team
Result	The final score. Sorted by goal difference in the match, then by goal difference in penalty-shoot-out if it is taken, followed by goal scored by the player's team in the match, then by goal scored in the penalty-shoot-out. For matches with identical final scores, match ending in extra-time without penalty-shoot-out is a tougher match, therefore precede matches that ended in regulation
aet	The score at the end of extra-time; the match was tied at the end of 90' regulation
pso	Penalty-shoot-out score shown in parentheses; the match was tied at the end of extra-time
	Green background color – exhibition or closed door international friendly match
	Yellow background color – match at an invitational tournament
	Red background color – Olympic women's football qualification match
	Light-blue background color – FIFA women's world cup qualification match
	Orange background color – Continental Games or regional tournament
NOTE on background colors: Continental Games or regional tournament are sometimes also qualifier for World Cup or Olympics; information depends on the source such as the player's federation. NOTE: some keys may not apply for a particular football player

	Date	#	Location	Opponent	Lineup	Min	Score	Result	Competition
1	2009-03-05	1.1	Paralimni	New Zealand	off 62' (on Vermeulen)	11	1–0	1–1	Cyprus Women's Cup
2	2010-02-24	1.1	Larnaka	Switzerland	off 72' (on Scott)	53	2–1	2–1	Cyprus Women's Cup
3	2010-02-27	1.1	Larnaka	England	Start	9	1–0	1–0	Cyprus Women's Cup
4	2010-03-01	1.1	Larnaka	South Africa	on 32' (off Robinson)	75	2–1	2–1	Cyprus Women's Cup
5	2010-10-31	1.1	Cancún	Guyana	off 39' (on Filigno)	15	1–0	8–0	FIFA Women's World Cup Qualifier (CONCACAF)
6	2011-05-18	1.1	Niederhasli	Switzerland	off 62' (on Scott)	70	2–1	2–1	Friendly
7	2011-05-28	1.1	Cancún	Netherlands	on 61' (off Robinson)	63	2–0	2–0	Friendly
8	2011-10-18	1.1	Guadalajara	Costa Rica	Start	30	1–1	3–1	Pan American Games
9	2011-10-20	1.1	Guadalajara	Argentina	Start	47	1–0	1–0	Pan American Games
10	2012-01-19	1.1	Vancouver	Haiti	Start	7	1–0	6–0	CONCACAF Women's Olympic Qualifier
Match Reports

== Ice hockey career ==
She played ice hockey for Melbourne Ice.
