= Andrea Neil =

Canadian soccer player (born 1971)

Personal information
- Date of birth: October 26, 1971 (age 55)
- Place of birth: Vancouver, British Columbia, Canada
- Height: 1.70 m (5 ft 7 in)
- Position: Midfielder

Youth career
- Kerrisdale Soccer Club
- 1989–1995: UBC Thunderbirds

Senior career*
| Years | Team | Apps | (Gls) |
| 2001–2006 | Vancouver Whitecaps FC | 69 | (24) |

International career
| 1991–2007 | Canada | 132 | (24) |

Managerial career
- 2009–2011: Canada (assistant)
- 2013–2014: UBC Thunderbirds
Medal record
Women's soccer
Representing Canada
Pan American Games
| Bronze medal – third place | 2007 Rio de Janeiro | Team |
- * Club domestic league appearances and goals

Andrea Neil (born October 26, 1971, in Vancouver, British Columbia) is a pioneer of women's soccer in Canada. Neil retired from the game after representing Canada more than any other Canadian player in history.

With a career spanning 18 years she went on to play for her country 132 times, and was the first Canadian to participate in four FIFA Women's World Cups as a player (1995, 1999, 2003, 2007), including Canada's best ever finish at a FIFA World Cup, when the Canadian women's national team finished fourth in 2003.

== Early career ==
Neil started her athletic career with badminton at the junior national level. After almost losing her leg to gangrene due to a motorcycle accident in the Dominican Republic, Neil decided to focus her career on soccer.

Neil attended the University of British Columbia where she earned a degree in human kinetics.

== Canada and UBC ==
In 1991, at 19, she made her international debut against Jamaica in Haiti.

In 1993 she was named UBC's female athlete of the year and the winner of the Marilyn Pomfret Award.

In 1994 Neil returned to the #1 ranked Thunderbirds under coach Dick Mosher. UBC outscored its opposition at a six to one ratio through the Conference season while Neil played a key role in UBC's winning of the CIAU National Championship. "She was not only an outstanding player but one of the finest leaders that I have experienced in the entire athletic program." Dick Mosher, coach of men's and women's soccer at UBC for more than 20 years.

In 2001, Neil was named Canadian Player of the Year.

From 2001 to 2006 Neil played for the Vancouver Whitecaps FC and set records for games played, minutes played and assists. While captain of the team she led them to two W-League championships in 2004 and 2006.

Neil made her 100th appearance against Costa Rica on April 21, 2004, becoming the second player to do so in Canadian history.

On April 21, 2007, prior to the World Cup in China, she represented Canada at the World All Star Game.

Neil played her last game for Canada on September 15, 2007, against Ghana during the FIFA Women's World Cup in China.

Neil retired with the most appearances in Canadian soccer history and fifth overall for goals.

Neil was awarded the title of 4-time silver medalist by the CONCACAF.

== Retirement ==
On May 28, 2008, the Vancouver Whitecaps retired the #5 jersey in honour of her career. "Andrea Neil is the ultimate pioneer and ambassador. Her relentless commitment to growing women's soccer in Canada is second to none. She is a natural leader and was instrumental during the Whitecaps two W-League championships, 2004 and 2006." Bob Lenarduzzi, Vancouver Whitecaps FC President-

In 2008, Neil was one of three women recognized at the annual In Her Footsteps ... Celebrating B.C. Women in Sport gala at the B.C. Sports Hall of Fame and Museum. The permanent exhibit celebrates women who have made a difference through sports for girls and women in the province of British Columbia.

In April 2009 Neil was inducted into the UBC Sport Hall of Fame.

On November 8, 2011, Neil became the first woman and third player overall to be inducted for soccer into the Canada's Sport Hall of Fame.

In June 2012, Neil was further recognized for her contributions to soccer. She was inducted into the Canadian Soccer Hall of Fame. As part of the Canadian Soccer Association's centennial celebrations, Neil was selected as a member of the All-Time Canada XI - Women's Team. In September 2012, Neil was inducted into the BC Sports Hall of Fame.

On August 10, 2014, at BC Place in Vancouver BC, Neil was inducted into the Vancouver Whitecaps Ring of Honour, as part of the club's 40th anniversary. This acclaim acknowledges exemplary players and figures who have embodied "Our all. Our honour" and who represent the club's three core values: Unity, Winning, and Honour. Her fellow 2014 inductees were Bob Lenarduzzi, Carl Valentine and Domenic Mobilio.

== Coaching ==
During her playing years, Neil was also involved with the sport as a soccer coach. From 1997 to 1999 she was the assistant coach for the UBC Thunderbirds Women's Team. From 2004 to 2006 she was an assistant coach for the Vancouver Whitecaps FC women's team and their Youth Academy Girls Head Coach.

Neil earned her USSF National "B" Coaching License in Carson, CA, USA in April 2009 and her UEFA Coaching A License (Coverciano) in Florence, ITA in July 2010.

After officially retiring as a player, Neil went on to be one of Canadian women's national team's assistant coaches, helping the team to win the Cyprus Cup twice (2010, 2011), the Brazil Four Nations Tournament (2010) and the second CONCACAF Women's Championship during World Cup Qualifying in 2010.

On November 10, 2014, after two seasons as head coach of the UBC Thunderbird's women's soccer program and a career record of 15-8-5, Neil resigned to pursue other opportunities.

"I am very proud of my time here at the university, both as a coach and as a player," Neil said. "I think the program has a very bright future, and I'm very excited that UBC was able to secure the 2015 CIS Women's Soccer Championship. I think the program is headed in a great direction and will continue to do well."

In May 2015 it was announced that Neil would be an Analyst on TSN Radio as part of their coverage of the FIFA WOMEN'S WORLD CUP CANADA 2015™.

== See also ==
- List of women's footballers with 100 or more international caps
