= China women's national football team results (2000–2009) =

This article lists the results for the China women's national football team between 2000 and 2009.

Key
Win
Draw
Defeat

== 2000 ==
14 January 2000 Friendly	China	6–0	South Korea	Hong Kong
12:00 UTC+8

16 January 2000 Friendly	China	3–1	Nigeria	Hong Kong
14:00 UTC+8

8 March 2000 Friendly	France	0–1	China	Orléans

12 March 2000 2000 Algarve Cup	China	4–0	Canada	Lagoa

14 March 2000 2000 Algarve Cup	China	4–1	Finland	Albufeira

16 March 2000 2000 Algarve Cup	China	0–3	Norway	Portimão

18 March 2000 2000 Algarve Cup	China	1–0	Sweden	Quarteira

31 May 2000 Pacific Cup	China	1–0	United States	Canberra
		Report

2 June 2000 Pacific Cup	Australia	1–1 (3–4 p)	China	Sydney
		Report

4 June 2000 Pacific Cup	China	2–0	Japan	Sydney
		Report

8 June 2000 Pacific Cup	Canada	2–2 (5–3 p)	China	Newcastle
		Report

10 June 2000 Pacific Cup	China	6–0	New Zealand	Newcastle
		Report

24 June 2000 2000 CONCACAF Women's Gold Cup	China	14–0	Guatemala	Foxborough
		Report

26 June 2000 2000 CONCACAF Women's Gold Cup	China	3–2	Canada	Hersheypark Stadium, Hershey

28 June 2000 2000 CONCACAF Women's Gold Cup	Mexico	0–3	China	Cardinal Stadium, Louisville

1 July 2000 2000 CONCACAF Women's Gold Cup	China	2–3 (a.e.t.)	Brazil	Cardinal Stadium, Louisville

3 July 2000 2000 CONCACAF Women's Gold Cup	China	2–1	Canada	Foxborough

16 July 2000 Friendly	Germany	1–3	China	Osnabrück

19 July 2000 Friendly	United States	1–1	China	Göttingen

22 July 2000 Friendly	Norway	1–0	China	Celle

14 August 2000 Friendly	China	3–0	Australia	Yangzhou

17 August 2000 Friendly	China	0–0	Australia	Shanghai

14 September 2000 2000 Summer Olympics	China	3–1	Nigeria	Canberra Stadium, Canberra
17:30		Report		Attendance: 16,000

17 September 2000 2000 Summer Olympics	United States	1–1	China	Melbourne Cricket Ground, Melbourne
17:30		Report		Attendance: 32,500

20 September 2000 2000 Summer Olympics	Norway	2–1	China	Canberra Stadium, Canberra
17:30		Report		Attendance: 11,532

== 2001 ==
11 January 2001 Friendly	China	1–0	United States	Henry Fok Stadium, Guangzhou
20:00 UTC+8		Report

14 January 2001 Friendly	China	1–1 (3–2 p)	United States	Hangzhou
14:30 UTC+8

6 March 2001 Friendly	Germany	1–0	China	Augsburg

8 March 2001 Friendly	Germany	2–4	China	Ulm

11 March 2001 2001 Algarve Cup	Denmark	2–1	China	Albufeira

13 March 2001 2001 Algarve Cup	Norway	0–2	China	Olhão

15 March 2001 2001 Algarve Cup	China	3–0	Finland	Portimão

17 March 2001 2001 Algarve Cup	China	5–1	Canada	Loulé

20 March 2001 Friendly	France	1–1	China	Mantes-la-Ville

4 July 2001 Friendly	North Korea	2–0	China	Pyongyang

10 July 2001 Friendly	North Korea	3–2	China	Pyongyang

3 August 2001 Friendly	Brazil	0–0	China	Ulsan

5 August 2001 Friendly	Japan	2–2	China	Gangneung

7 August 2001 Friendly	South Korea	3–1	China	Suwon

9 September 2001 Friendly	Japan	0–3	China	Chicago

5 December 2001 2001 AFC Women's Championship	China	10–0	Hong Kong
		Report

7 December 2001 2001 AFC Women's Championship	China	11–0	Uzbekistan
		Report

9 December 2001 2001 AFC Women's Championship	China	10–0	Philippines
		Report

14 December 2001 2001 AFC Women's Championship	North Korea	3–1	China
		Report

16 December 2001 2001 AFC Women's Championship	South Korea	0–8	China

== 2002 ==
23 January 2002 2002 Guangzhou Four Nations Tournament	China	2–1	Germany	Huadu Stadium, Guangzhou
15:55 UTC+8		Report

25 January 2002 2002 Guangzhou Four Nations Tournament	China	0–3	Norway	Henry Fok Stadium, Guangzhou
19:30 UTC+8		Report

27 January 2002 2002 Guangzhou Four Nations Tournament	China	0–2	United States	Tianhe Stadium, Guangzhou
15:55 UTC+8		Report

1 March 2002 2002 Algarve Cup	China	4–1	Finland	Portimão
		Report

3 March 2002 2002 Algarve Cup	Germany	2–4	China	Vila Real de Santo António
		Report

5 March 2002 2002 Algarve Cup	Denmark	0–1	China	Olhão
		Report

7 March 2002 2002 Algarve Cup	China	1–0	Norway	Loulé
		Report

27 August 2002 Far East Four Nations Tournament	China	4–0	Japan	Wuhan Sports Center Stadium, Wuhan
15:55 UTC+8		Report

29 August 2002 Far East Four Nations Tournament	China	3–0	South Korea	Wuhan Sports Center Stadium, Wuhan
15:55 UTC+8		Report

31 August 2002 Far East Four Nations Tournament	China	2–1	Russia	Wuhan Sports Center Stadium, Wuhan
18:30 UTC+8		Report

2 October 2002 2002 Asian Games	Chinese Taipei	0–1	China	Busan Gudeok Stadium, Busan
17:03 UTC+9		Report

4 October 2002 2002 Asian Games	North Korea	0–0	China	Changwon Sports Park, Changwon
19:03 UTC+9		Report

7 October 2002 2002 Asian Games	China	4–1	Vietnam	Busan Gudeok Stadium, Busan
17:03 UTC+9		Report

9 October 2002 2002 Asian Games	China	2–2	Japan	Changwon Sports Park, Changwon
17:03 UTC+9		Report

11 October 2002 2002 Asian Games	South Korea	0–4	China	Changwon Sports Park, Changwon
17:23 UTC+9		Report

== 2003 ==
23 January 2003 2003 Four Nations Tournament	China	0–0	Germany	Yiwu Meihu Sports Centre, Yiwu
19:30 UTC+8		Report

26 January 2003 2003 Four Nations Tournament	China	2–0	United States	Wuhan Sports Center Stadium, Wuhan
15:35 UTC+8		Report

29 January 2003 2003 Four Nations Tournament	China	1–1	Norway	Hongkou Football Stadium, Shanghai
15:45 UTC+8		Report

22 February 2003 Friendly	France	1–2	China	Marmande
		Report

27 February 2003 Friendly	France XI	1–1	China	Clairefontaine, Clairefontaine-en-Yvelines
		Report

4 March 2003 Friendly	Germany	2–2	China	Gütersloh
15:00 UTC+1		Report

6 March 2003 Friendly	Germany	3–1	China	Arnsberg
		Report

8 March 2003 Friendly	Scotland	0–3	China	Milngavie
		Report

10 March 2003 Friendly	Scotland	0–1	China	Livingston
		Report

14 March 2003 2003 Algarve Cup	China	0–0	Finland	Silves
		Report

16 March 2003 2003 Algarve Cup	China	3–0	France	Ferreiras
		Report

18 March 2003 2003 Algarve Cup	China	2–1	Denmark	Albufeira
		Report

20 March 2003 2003 Algarve Cup	United States	2–0	China	Loulé
		Report

9 June 2003 2003 AFC Women's Championship	China	6–0	Vietnam	Nakhon Sawan Province Stadium, Nakhon Sawan
16:00 UTC+7		Report

11 June 2003 2003 AFC Women's Championship	China	12–0	India	Nakhon Sawan Province Stadium, Nakhon Sawan
18:15 UTC+7		Report

13 June 2003 2003 AFC Women's Championship	China	11–0	Uzbekistan	Nakhon Sawan Province Stadium, Nakhon Sawan
18:15 UTC+7		Report

19 June 2003 2003 AFC Women's Championship	China	3–1	South Korea	Rajamangala Stadium, Bangkok
19:00 UTC+7		Report

21 June 2003 2003 AFC Women's Championship	North Korea	2–1 (a.e.t.)	China	Rajamangala Stadium, Bangkok
19:00 UTC+7		Report

22 August 2003 Friendly	China	1–0	Nigeria	Tai'an
19:45 UTC+8		Report

25 August 2003 Friendly	China	2–3	Nigeria	Linyi Stadium, Linyi
16:05 UTC+8		Report

28 August 2003 Friendly	China	2–0	Australia	Shandong Provincial Stadium, Jinan
19:45 UTC+8		Report

31 August 2003 Friendly	China	2–0	Australia	Qingdao Tiantai Stadium, Qingdao
		Report

4 September 2003 Friendly	China	8–0	South Africa	Jinzhou Stadium, Dalian
		Report

7 September 2003 Friendly	China	13–0	South Africa	Dalian People's Stadium, Dalian
		Report

15 September 2003 Friendly	Sweden	2–2	China	Washington, D.C.
12:30 UTC−4		Report

21 September 2003 2003 FIFA Women's World Cup	China	1–0	Ghana	Home Depot Center, Carson
20:15 UTC−7				Attendance: 15,239; Referee: Sonia Denoncourt (Canada)

25 September 2003 2003 FIFA Women's World Cup	China	1–1	Australia	Home Depot Center, Carson
19:01 UTC−7		Report		Attendance: 13,929

28 September 2003 2003 FIFA Women's World Cup	China	1–0	Russia	PGE Park, Portland
20:00 UTC−7		Report		Attendance: 19,132

2 October 2003 2003 FIFA Women's World Cup	China	0–1	Canada	PGE Park, Portland
19:30 UTC−7		Report		Attendance: 20,012

== 2004 ==
30 January 2004 2004 Shenzhen Four Nations Tournament	China	2–1	Canada	Shenzhen Stadium, Shenzhen
14:30 UTC+8		Report

1 February 2004 2004 Shenzhen Four Nations Tournament	China	0–0	United States	Shenzhen Stadium, Shenzhen
14:30 UTC+8		Report

3 February 2004 2004 Shenzhen Four Nations Tournament	China	2–2	Sweden	Shenzhen Stadium, Shenzhen
16:30 UTC+8		Report

4 March 2004 Friendly	Germany	0–1	China	Fürth
18:00 UTC+1		Report

7 March 2004 Friendly	Czech Republic	0–1	China	Schwandorf
15:00 UTC+1		Report

14 March 2004 2004 Algarve Cup	Italy	1–0	China	Guia
		Report

16 March 2004 2004 Algarve Cup	Finland	0–4	China	Olhão
		Report

18 March 2004 2004 Algarve Cup	Norway	0–0	China	Silves
		Report

20 March 2004 2004 Algarve Cup	Sweden	1–1 (5–4 p)	China	Olhão
15:00 UTC±0		Report

14 April 2004 Friendly	Japan	0–1	China	Tokyo
12:00 UTC+9		Report

18 April 2004 Women's Olympic Qualifying Tournament	China	11–0	Myanmar	Hiroshima
		Report

20 April 2004 Women's Olympic Qualifying Tournament	Guam	0–9	China	Hiroshima
		Report

22 April 2004 Women's Olympic Qualifying Tournament	China	3–0	South Korea	Hiroshima
		Report

24 April 2004 Women's Olympic Qualifying Tournament	China	1–0	South Korea	Hiroshima
		Report

26 April 2004 Women's Olympic Qualifying Tournament	Japan	0–1	China	Hiroshima
		Report

30 June 2004 Friendly	China	0–2	Australia	Xianghe Football Base, Xianghe

1 July 2004 Friendly	China	1–1	Australia	Xianghe Football Base, Xianghe

1 August 2004 Friendly	United States	3–1	China	East Hartford
15:00 UTC−4		Report

11 August 2004 2004 Summer Olympics	Germany	8–0	China	Pampeloponnisiako Stadium, Patras
18:00 UTC+3

14 August 2004 2004 Summer Olympics	China	1–1	Mexico	Pampeloponnisiako Stadium, Patras
18:00 UTC+3

== 2005 ==
25 January 2005 Friendly	China	1–0	Australia	Quanzhou Stadium, Quanzhou
19:30 UTC+8		Report

28 January 2005 2005 Quanzhou Four Nations Tournament	China	3–1	Russia	Quanzhou Stadium, Quanzhou
19:45 UTC+8		Report

30 January 2005 2005 Quanzhou Four Nations Tournament	China	3–0	Australia	Quanzhou Stadium, Quanzhou
14:00 UTC+8		Report

1 February 2005 2005 Quanzhou Four Nations Tournament	China	0–2	Germany	Quanzhou Stadium, Quanzhou
19:25 UTC+8		Report

4 February 2005 Friendly	China	0–0	Denmark	Yiwu Meihu Sports Centre, Yiwu
15:30 UTC+8		Report

7 February 2005 Friendly	China	1–1	Denmark	Yiwu Meihu Sports Centre, Yiwu
15:30 UTC+8		Report

9 March 2005 2005 Algarve Cup	Norway	2–1	China

11 March 2005 2005 Algarve Cup	China	0–2	Sweden

13 March 2005 2005 Algarve Cup	China	0–2	Germany

15 March 2005 2005 Algarve Cup	China	0–0 (5–3 p)	England

16 July 2005 Friendly	China	1–2	Australia	Minyuan Stadium, Tianjin
19:30 UTC+8		Report

19 July 2005 Friendly	China	2–0	Australia	Minyuan Stadium, Tianjin
20:05 UTC+8		Report

1 August 2005 2005 EAFF Women's Football Championship	South Korea	2–0	China	Jeonju World Cup Stadium, Jeonju
17:00 UTC+9		Report		Attendance: 4,283; Referee: Oiwa Mayumi

3 August 2005 2005 EAFF Women's Football Championship	Japan	0–0	China	Daejeon World Cup Stadium, Daejeon
17:30 UTC+9		Report		Attendance: 865; Referee: Hong Eun Ah

6 August 2005 2005 EAFF Women's Football Championship	China	0–1	North Korea	Daejeon World Cup Stadium, Daejeon
17:00 UTC+9		Report		Attendance: 500; Referee: Oiwa Mayumi

25 November 2005 Friendly	Australia	0–0	China
		Report

28 November 2005 Friendly	Australia	3–1	China
		Report

1 December 2005 Friendly	Australia	Cancelled	China
		Report

3 December 2005 Friendly	Australia	0–0	China
		Report

== 2006 ==
18 January 2006 2006 Guangzhou Four Nations Tournament	China	1–1	France	Guangdong Olympic Stadium, Guangzhou
16:00 UTC+8		Report

20 January 2006 2006 Guangzhou Four Nations Tournament	China	3–1	Norway	Guangdong Olympic Stadium, Guangzhou
16:00 UTC+8		Report

22 January 2006 2006 Guangzhou Four Nations Tournament	China	0–2	United States	Guangdong Olympic Stadium, Guangzhou
16:00 UTC+8		Report

23 February 2006 Friendly	Netherlands	0–0	China	Yanmar Stadion, Almere
		Report

1 March 2006 Friendly	Germany	0–1	China	Waldstadion Homburg, Homburg
		Report

9 March 2006 2006 Algarve Cup	China	0–0	United States

11 March 2006 2006 Algarve Cup	France	1–0	China

13 March 2006 2006 Algarve Cup	China	6–0	Denmark

15 March 2006 2006 Algarve Cup	Norway	1–0	China

27 May 2006 Friendly	China	1–1	North Korea	Xianghe Football Base, Xianghe
		Report

30 May 2006 Friendly	China	1–1	North Korea	TEDA Football Stadium, Tianjin
19:30 UTC+8		Report

16 June 2006 Friendly	China	2–1	Australia	Kangqiao Football Base, Shanghai
		Report

19 June 2006 Friendly	China	2–0	Australia	Shanghai
		Report

19 July 2006 2006 AFC Women's Asian Cup	China	2–0	Chinese Taipei	Hindmarsh Stadium, Adelaide
12:00 UTC+9:30

21 July 2006 2006 AFC Women's Asian Cup	Vietnam	0–2	China	Hindmarsh Stadium, Adelaide
19:00 UTC+9:30

23 July 2006 2006 AFC Women's Asian Cup	China	0–1	Japan	Hindmarsh Stadium, Adelaide
14:30 UTC+9:30

27 July 2006 2006 AFC Women's Asian Cup	China	1–0	North Korea	Hindmarsh Stadium, Adelaide
19:30 UTC+9:30

30 July 2006 2006 AFC Women's Asian Cup	Australia	2–2 (a.e.t.) (2–4 p)	China	Hindmarsh Stadium, Adelaide
15:30 UTC+9:30

19 August 2006 Friendly	Canada	0–0	China	King George V Park, St. John's
16:00 UTC−2:30		Report

22 August 2006 Friendly	Canada	1–1	China	King George V Park, St. John's
17:30 UTC−2:30		Report

25 August 2006 Friendly	United States	3–0	China	Toyota Park, Bridgeview
		Report

27 August 2006 Friendly	United States	4–1	China	Toyota Park, Bridgeview
		Report

10 November 2006 Friendly	China	4–1	Vietnam	Hangzhou Greentown Football Base, Hangzhou
14:30 UTC+8		Report

12 November 2006 Friendly	China	2–0	Vietnam	Hangzhou Greentown Football Base, Hangzhou
		Report

14 November 2006 Friendly	China	3–0	New Zealand	Hangzhou Greentown Football Base, Hangzhou
		Report

16 November 2006 Friendly	China	4–0	New Zealand	Hangzhou Greentown Football Base, Hangzhou
		Report

30 November 2006 2006 Asian Games	China	7–0	Thailand	Grand Hamad Stadium, Doha
19:45 UTC+3		Report

4 December 2006 2006 Asian Games	Jordan	0–12	China	Al-Gharrafa Stadium, Al Rayyan
19:45 UTC+3		Report

7 December 2006 2006 Asian Games	China	0–1	Japan	Al-Rayyan Stadium, Al Rayyan
19:45 UTC+3		Report

10 December 2006 2006 Asian Games	North Korea	3–1 (a.e.t.)	China	Qatar SC Stadium, Doha
19:00 UTC+3		Report

13 December 2006 2006 Asian Games	South Korea	0–2	China	Qatar SC Stadium, Doha
16:00 UTC+3		Report

== 2007 ==
26 January 2007 2007 Guangzhou Four Nations Tournament	China	2–0	England	Guangdong Olympic Stadium, Guangzhou
13:30 UTC+8		Report

28 January 2007 2007 Guangzhou Four Nations Tournament	China	0–0	Germany	Guangdong Olympic Stadium, Guangzhou
13:30 UTC+8		Report

30 January 2007 2007 Guangzhou Four Nations Tournament	China	0–2	United States	Guangdong Olympic Stadium, Guangzhou
15:30 UTC+8		Report

8 February 2007 Friendly	China	2–1	Russia	Duyun
14:00 UTC+8		Report

11 February 2007 Friendly	China	1–0	Russia	Duyun
14:00 UTC+8		Report

28 February 2007 Friendly	France	2–0	China	Bordeaux
		Report

7 March 2007 2007 Algarve Cup	United States	2–1	China	Estádio Algarve, Algarve

9 March 2007 2007 Algarve Cup	Sweden	1–0	China	Estádio Algarve, Algarve

12 March 2007 2007 Algarve Cup	China	0–2	Finland	Estádio do Portimonense, Portimão

14 March 2007 2007 Algarve Cup	Iceland	4–1	China	Complexo Desportivo, Montechoro

3 May 2007 Friendly	China	3–1	Canada	Nanjing Olympic Sports Centre, Nanjing
19:30 UTC+8		Report

6 May 2007 Friendly	China	2–1	Canada	Nanjing Olympic Sports Centre Outer Field, Nanjing
17:00 UTC+8		Report

13 May 2007 Friendly	China	5–2	South Korea	Yellow Dragon Sports Center, Hangzhou
14:30 UTC+8		Report

15 May 2007 Friendly	China	2–0	South Korea	Hangzhou Greentown Football Base, Hangzhou
14:30 UTC+8		Report

30 May 2007 Friendly	China	2–2	Australia	Xianghe Football Base, Xianghe
16:30 UTC+8		Report

5 June 2007 Friendly	Argentina	0–1	China
15:30 UTC−3		Report

8 June 2007 Friendly	Argentina	1–0	China
15:30 UTC−3		Report

16 June 2007 Friendly	United States	2–0	China	FirstEnergy Stadium, Cleveland
19:00 UTC−4		Report

1 July 2007 Friendly	China	4–0	Thailand	Qinhuangdao Olympic Sports Center Stadium, Qinhuangdao
19:45 UTC+8		Report

4 July 2007 Friendly	China	1–0	Mexico	Shenyang Olympic Sports Center Stadium, Shenyang
19:35 UTC+8		Report

7 July 2007 Friendly	China	3–1	Italy	Qinhuangdao Olympic Sports Center Stadium, Qinhuangdao
19:45 UTC+8		Report

10 July 2007 Friendly	China	1–0	Mexico	Shenyang Olympic Sports Center Stadium, Shenyang
21:00 UTC+8		Report

16 August 2007 Friendly	China	2–3	Australia	Tianjin Olympic Center Stadium, Tianjin
20:00 UTC+8		Report

19 August 2007 Friendly	China	1–3	Australia	Tianjin Olympic Center Stadium, Tianjin
20:00 UTC+8		Report

23 August 2007 Friendly	China	6–0	Vietnam	Hongkou Football Stadium, Shanghai
20:00 UTC+8		Report

26 August 2007 Friendly	China	1–0	England	Estádio Campo Desportivo, Macau
20:00 UTC+8		Report

5 September 2007 Friendly	China	4–0	Hungary	Wuhan Sports Center Stadium, Wuhan
20:00 UTC+8		Report

12 September 2007 2007 FIFA Women's World Cup	China	3–2	Denmark	Wuhan Sports Center Stadium, Wuhan
20:00 UTC+8

15 September 2007 2007 FIFA Women's World Cup	China	0–4	Brazil	Wuhan Sports Center Stadium, Wuhan
20:00 UTC+8

20 September 2007 2007 FIFA Women's World Cup	China	2–0	New Zealand	Tianjin Olympic Center Stadium, Tianjin
20:00 UTC+8

23 September 2007 2007 FIFA Women's World Cup	Norway	1–0	China	Wuhan Sports Center Stadium, Wuhan
17:00 UTC+8

16 December 2007 Friendly	China	1–0	New Zealand	Huangpu Sports Center, Guangzhou
15:00 UTC+8		Report

19 December 2007 Friendly	China	4–0	New Zealand	Huangpu Sports Center, Guangzhou
14:30 UTC+8		Report

== 2008 ==
16 January 2008 2008 Guangzhou Four Nations Tournament	China	2–0	Finland	Guangdong Olympic Stadium, Guangzhou
15:30 UTC+8		Report

18 January 2008 2008 Guangzhou Four Nations Tournament	China	0–0	Canada	Guangdong Olympic Stadium, Guangzhou
14:00 UTC+8		Report

20 January 2008 2008 Guangzhou Four Nations Tournament	China	0–1	United States	Guangdong Olympic Stadium, Guangzhou
15:30 UTC+8		Report

18 February 2008 2008 EAFF Women's Football Championship	China	3–2	South Korea	Yongchuan Sports Center, Chongqing
19:30 UTC+8

21 February 2008 2008 EAFF Women's Football Championship	China	0–0	North Korea	Yongchuan Sports Center, Chongqing
19:30 UTC+8

24 February 2008 2008 EAFF Women's Football Championship	China	0–3	Japan	Yongchuan Sports Center, Chongqing
16:30 UTC+8

28 February 2008 Friendly	Germany	2–0	China	Schwarzwald-Stadion, Freiburg

5 March 2008 2008 Algarve Cup	China	0–4	United States	Albufeira Municipal Stadium, Albufeira
13:45 UTC±0

7 March 2008 2008 Algarve Cup	Norway	3–1	China	Albufeira Municipal Stadium, Albufeira
16:15 UTC±0

10 March 2008 2008 Algarve Cup	China	0–2	Italy	Municipal Stadium, Loulé
15:00 UTC±0

12 March 2008 2008 Algarve Cup	China	1–1 (5–4 p)	Portugal	CD Montechoro, Albufeira
10:00 UTC±0

26 April 2008 Friendly	China	2–1	South Korea	Chinese Football School Stadium, Qinhuangdao
15:30 UTC+8		Report

28 April 2008 Friendly	China	2–0	South Korea	Qinhuangdao Olympic Sports Center Stadium, Qinhuangdao
16:30 UTC+8		Report

4 May 2008 Friendly	Netherlands	2–2	China	JenS Vesting, Emmen
		Report

7 May 2008 Friendly	Netherlands	1–1	China	JenS Vesting, Emmen
		Report

28 May 2008 2008 AFC Women's Asian Cup	China	1–0	Vietnam	Thống Nhất Stadium, Ho Chi Minh City
19:30 UTC+7

30 May 2008 2008 AFC Women's Asian Cup	Thailand	1–5	China	Thống Nhất Stadium, Ho Chi Minh City
19:30 UTC+7

1 June 2008 2008 AFC Women's Asian Cup	China	0–1	North Korea	Army Stadium, Ho Chi Minh City
18:30 UTC+7

5 June 2008 2008 AFC Women's Asian Cup	Japan	1–3	China	Thống Nhất Stadium, Ho Chi Minh City
19:00 UTC+7

8 June 2008 2008 AFC Women's Asian Cup	North Korea	2–1	China	Thống Nhất Stadium, Ho Chi Minh City
19:00 UTC+7

6 July 2008 Friendly	China	1–2	Australia	Tianjin Olympic Center Stadium, Tianjin
19:45 UTC+8		Report

9 July 2008 Friendly	China	5–0	Australia	Tianjin Olympic Center Stadium Outer Field, Tianjin
19:45 UTC+8		Report

16 July 2008 Friendly	China	3–1	New Zealand	Qinhuangdao Olympic Sports Center Stadium, Qinhuangdao
17:00 UTC+8		Report

20 July 2008 Friendly	China	1–0	New Zealand	Qinhuangdao Olympic Sports Center Stadium, Qinhuangdao
19:45 UTC+8		Report

27 July 2008 Friendly	China	2–2	Nigeria	Chinese Football School Stadium, Qinhuangdao
16:45 UTC+8		Report

30 July 2008 Friendly	China	0–0	United States	Chinese Football School Stadium, Qinhuangdao
16:45 UTC+8		Report

6 August 2008 2008 Summer Olympics	China	2–1	Sweden	Tianjin Olympic Center Stadium, Tianjin
19:45 UTC+8	Xu Yuan 6'; Han Duan 72'	Report	Schelin 38'	Attendance: 37,902; Referee: Hong Eun-ah (South Korea)

9 August 2008 2008 Summer Olympics	Canada	1–1	China	Tianjin Olympic Center Stadium, Tianjin
19:45 UTC+8	Sinclair 34'	Report	Xu Yuan 36'	Attendance: 52,600; Referee: Dagmar Damková (Czech Republic)

12 August 2008 2008 Summer Olympics	China	2–0	Argentina	Qinhuangdao Olympic Sports Center Stadium, Qinhuangdao
19:45 UTC+8	Han Duan 52'; Gu Yasha 90'	Report		Attendance: 31,492; Referee: Nicole Petignat (Switzerland)

15 August 2008 2008 Summer Olympics	China	0–2	Japan	Qinhuangdao Olympic Sports Center Stadium, Qinhuangdao
21:00 UTC+8		Report	Sawa 15'; Nagasato 80'	Attendance: 28,459; Referee: Christine Beck (Germany)

10 December 2008 Friendly	United States	2–2	China
		Report

13 December 2008 Friendly	United States	1–0	China	StubHub Center, Los Angeles
		Report

17 December 2008 Friendly	United States	1–0	China	Ford Field, Detroit
		Report

== 2009 ==
10 January 2009 2009 Guangzhou Four Nations Tournament	China	6–0	New Zealand	Yuexiushan Stadium, Guangzhou
20:10 UTC+8		Report

12 January 2009 2009 Guangzhou Four Nations Tournament	China	1–0	Finland	Yuexiushan Stadium, Guangzhou
19:35 UTC+8		Report

14 January 2009 2009 Guangzhou Four Nations Tournament	China	1–0	South Korea	Yuexiushan Stadium, Guangzhou
19:35 UTC+8		Report

25 February 2009 Friendly	Germany	1–1	China	Bielefelder Alm, Bielefeld
		Report

4 March 2009 2009 Algarve Cup	China	0–0	Sweden	Municipal Stadium, Lagos
15:00 UTC±0

6 March 2009 2009 Algarve Cup	Germany	3–0	China	Albufeira Municipal Stadium, Albufeira
13:15 UTC±0

9 March 2009 2009 Algarve Cup	Finland	0–1	China	Municipal Stadium, Vila Real de Santo António
13:15 UTC±0

11 March 2009 2009 Algarve Cup	China	2–1	Iceland	Estádio José Arcanjo, Olhão
11:30 UTC±0

6 July 2009 Friendly	Russia	0–0	China
		Report

9 July 2009 Friendly	Russia	0–1	China
		Report

11 July 2009 Friendly	South Africa	0–5	China
		Report

13 July 2009 Friendly	Switzerland	0–2	China
		Report

15 July 2009 Friendly	Netherlands	2–4	China
		Report

19 July 2009 Friendly	Sweden	2–0	China
		Report

9 December 2009 2009 International Women's Football Tournament of City of São Paulo	China	3–0	Mexico	Pacaembu Stadium, São Paulo
15:30 UTC−3

13 December 2009 2009 International Women's Football Tournament of City of São Paulo	China	0–1	Chile	Pacaembu Stadium, São Paulo
15:30 UTC−3

16 December 2009 2009 International Women's Football Tournament of City of São Paulo	Brazil	3–0	China	Pacaembu Stadium, São Paulo
21:50 UTC−3

20 December 2009 2009 International Women's Football Tournament of City of São Paulo	China	2–0	Chile	Pacaembu Stadium, São Paulo
13:30 UTC−3

27 December 2009 Friendly	China	1–1	North Korea	Jiangning Sports Center, Nanjing
16:00 UTC+8		Report

29 December 2009 Friendly	China	2–2	North Korea	Jiangning Sports Center, Nanjing
10:00 UTC+8		Report
