= Germany women's national football team results =

The Germany women's national football team started play in 1983. Women's football was long met with skepticism in Germany, and official matches were banned by the DFB until 1970. However, the women's national team has grown in popularity since winning the World Cup in 2003, as it was chosen as Germany's Sports Team of the Year. As of August 2020, Germany is ranked 2nd in the FIFA Women's World Rankings.

The German national team is one of the most successful in women's football. They are two-time world champions, having won the 2003 and 2007 tournaments. Germany is also one of the only two nations to have won both the women's and men's tournament, Spain is the other. The team has won eight of the twelve UEFA European Championships, claiming six consecutive titles between 1995 and 2013.

== 1982–1999 ==
=== 1982–1989 ===
1982–1989
Win Draw Defeat
1	Switzerland	10 November 1982	5–1	(Germany) Friendly
2	Belgium	5 March 1983	1–1	(Germany) European Championship Q
3	Netherlands	19 March 1983	2–2	(Netherlands) European Championship Q
4	Denmark	1 May 1983	1–1	(Denmark) European Championship Q
5	Switzerland	7 September 1983	2–0	(Switzerland) Friendly
6	Denmark	24 September 1983	0–1	(Denmark) European Championship Q
7	Netherlands	8 October 1983	1–1	(Germany) European Championship Q
8	Belgium	22 October 1983	1–1	(Belgium) European Championship Q
9	Italy	25 January 1984	1–2	(Italy) Friendly
10	Norway	2 May 1984	1–4	(Norway) Friendly
11	Italy	19 August 1984	2–1	(Italy) Mundialito
12	England	22 August 1984	2–0	(Italy) Mundialito
13	Belgium	23 August 1984	0–2	(Italy) Mundialito
14	Italy	26 August 1984	1–3	(Italy) Mundialito
15	Finland	3 October 1984	1–0	(Germany) European Championship Q
16	Netherlands	21 November 1984	1–1	(Netherlands) Friendly
17	Hungary	9 April 1985	0–1	(Hungary) Friendly
18	Denmark	1 May 1985	0–3	(Denmark) European Championship Q
19	Norway	7 September 1985	2–3	(Germany) European Championship Q
20	Finland	5 October 1985	0–1	(Finland) European Championship Q
21	Hungary	15 April 1986	2–1	(Germany) European Championship Q
22	Norway	19 May 1986	0–0	(Norway) European Championship Q
23	Iceland	27 August 1986	4–1	(Iceland) Friendly
24	Iceland	30 August 1986	5–0	(Republic of Ireland) Friendly
25	Denmark	4 October 1986	2–0	(Germany) European Championship Q
26	Netherlands	19 November 1986	3–1	(Germany) Friendly
27	Netherlands	1 April 1987	3–1	(Germany) Friendly
28	France	16 May 1987	2–0	(Germany) Friendly
29	Iceland	4 September 1987	5–0	(Iceland) Friendly
30	Iceland	6 September 1987	3–2	(Iceland) Friendly
31	Hungary	7 October 1987	1–0	(Hungary) European Championship Q
32	Italy	15 November 1987	3–0	(Germany) European Championship Q
33	Italy	2 April 1988	0–0	(Italy) European Championship Q
34	Switzerland	14 May 1988	0–0	(Germany) European Championship Q
35	Italy	20 July 1988	0–1	(Italy) Friendly
36	United States	22 July 1988	1–2	(Germany) Friendly
37	Switzerland	17 September 1988	10–0	(Switzerland) European Championship Q
38	Hungary	30 October 1988	4–0	(Germany) European Championship Q
39	Czechoslovakia	26 November 1988	1–1	(Czechoslovakia) European Championship Q
40	Czechoslovakia	17 December 1988	2–0	(Germany) European Championship Q
41	Bulgaria	21 March 1989	3–1	(Bulgaria) Friendly
42	Denmark	10 May 1989	1–0	(Germany) Friendly
43	Italy	28 June 1989	1(4)-1(3)	(Germany) European Championship SF
44	Norway	2 July 1989	4–1	(Germany) European Championship F
45	Hungary	1 October 1989	0–0	(Germany) Euro Q
46	Czechoslovakia	22 November 1989	5–0	(Germany) Euro Q

=== 1990–1999 ===
1990–1999
Win Draw Defeat
47	Bulgaria	11 April 1990	4–1	(Bulgaria) Euro Q
48	Czechoslovakia	29 April 1990	1–0	(Czechoslovakia) Euro Q
49	England	5 August 1990	3–1	(United States) Friendly
50	Soviet Union	7 August 1990	3–0	(United States) Friendly
51	United States B	9 August 1990	3–2	(United States) Friendly
52	United States	11 August 1990	0–3	(United States) Friendly
53	Bulgaria	26 September 1990	4–0	(Germany) Euro Q
54	Hungary	14 October 1990	4–0	(Hungary) Euro Q
55	England	25 November 1990	4–1	(England) Euro Q
56	England	16 December 1990	2–0	(Germany) Euro Q
57	France	28 March 1991	2–0	(France) Friendly
58	Poland	9 May 1991	2–1	(Germany) Friendly
59	United States	30 May 1991	2–4	(Germany) Friendly
60	China	30 June 1991	2–0	(Germany) Friendly
61	Italy	11 July 1991	3–0	(Denmark) Euro SF
62	Norway	14 July 1991	3–1 aet	(Denmark) Euro Final
63	Switzerland	28 August 1991	3–1	(Germany) Friendly
64	Hungary	25 September 1991	2–0	(Hungary) Friendly
65	Belgium	9 October 1991	2–1	(Belgium) Friendly
66	Nigeria	17 November 1991	4–0	(China) World Cup
67	Chinese Taipei	19 November 1991	3–0	(China) World Cup
68	Italy	21 November 1991	2–0	(China) World Cup
69	Denmark	24 November 1991	2–1 aet	(China) World Cup QF
70	United States	27 November 1991	2–5	(China) World Cup SF
71	Sweden	29 November 1991	0–4	(China) World Cup 3rd Place
72	Italy	18 April 1992	1–1	(Italy) Friendly
73	(Socialist Federal Republic of Yugoslavia) Yugoslavia	28 May 1992	3–0	(Bulgaria) Euro Q
74	France	2 September 1992	7–0	(Germany) Friendly
75	Poland	5 September 1992	4–0	(Poland) Friendly
76	Russia	11 October 1992	7–0	(Russia) Euro Q
77	Russia	14 November 1992	0–0	(Germany) Euro Q
78	Sweden	11 March 1993	1–3	(Germany) Friendly
79	France	12 March 1993	3–0	(France) Friendly
80	United States	14 March 1993	1–0	(Germany) Friendly
81	United States	7 April 1993	2–1	(United States) Friendly
82	United States	10 April 1993	0–3	(United States) Friendly
83	Switzerland	5 May 1993	1–0	(Switzerland) Friendly
84	Italy	30 June 1993	1(3)-1(4)	(Italy) Euro SF
85	Denmark	3 July 1993	1–3	(Italy) Euro 3rd
86	Sweden	22 September 1993	2–3	(Sweden) Friendly
87	Norway	25 September 1993	3–1	(Germany) Friendly
88	Switzerland	24 October 1993	5–0	(Switzerland) Euro Q
89	Russia	7 December 1993	1–0	(Germany) Friendly
90	Poland	8 December 1993	7–0	(Poland) Friendly
91	Wales	31 March 1994	12–0	(Germany) Euro Q
92	Wales	5 May 1994	12–0	(Wales) Euro Q
93	Croatia	2 June 1994	7–0	(Croatia) Euro Q
94	Canada	27 July 1994	2–1	(Canada) Friendly
95	United States	31 July 1994	1–2	(United States) Friendly
96	Norway	2 August 1994	6–3	(Germany) Friendly
97	China	6 August 1994	2–3	(China) Friendly
98	Sweden	7 September 1994	3–1	(Germany) Friendly
99	Croatia	21 September 1994	8–0	(Germany) Euro Q
100	Switzerland	25 September 1994	11–0	(Germany) Euro Q
101	Russia	9 October 1994	1–0	(Russia) Euro Q
102	Russia	27 October 1994	4–0	(Germany) Euro Q
103	England	12 November 1994	4–1	(England) Euro SF
104	England	28 February 1995	2–1	(Germany) Euro SF
105	Sweden	26 March 1995	3–2	(Germany) Euro F
106	Poland	13 April 1995	8–0	(Germany) Friendly
107	Switzerland	23 May 1995	8–0	(Switzerland) Friendly
108	China	25 May 1995	3–1	(Germany) Friendly
109	Japan	5 June 1995	1–0	(Sweden) World Cup
110	Sweden	7 June 1995	2–3	(Sweden) World Cup
111	Brazil	9 June 1995	6–1	(Sweden) World Cup
112	England	13 June 1995	3–0	(Sweden) World Cup QF
113	China	15 June 1995	1–0	(Sweden) World Cup SF
114	Norway	18 June 1995	0–2	(Sweden) World Cup Final
115	Finland	20 September 1995	3–0	(Finland) Euro Q
116	Slovakia	25 October 1995	3–0	(Slovakia) Euro Q
117	United States	14 March 1996	0–6	(United States) Friendly
118	United States	16 March 1996	0–2	(United States) Friendly
119	Slovakia	11 April 1996	2–0	(Germany) Euro Q
120	Norway	2 May 1996	1–3	(Germany) Euro Q
121	Finland	5 May 1996	6–0	(Germany) Euro Q
122	Norway	6 June 1996	0–0	(Norway) Euro Q
123	Iceland	26 June 1996	8–0	(Germany) Friendly
124	Iceland	30 June 1996	3–0	(Germany) Friendly
125	Japan	21 July 1996	3–2	(United States) Olympics
126	Norway	23 July 1996	2–3	(United States) Olympics
127	Brazil	25 July 1996	1–1	(United States) Olympics
128	Netherlands	27 August 1996	3–0	(Netherlands) Friendly
129	Iceland	18 September 1996	3–0	(Iceland) Euro Q
130	Iceland	29 September 1996	4–0	(Germany) Euro Q
131	Italy	11 December 1996	0–0	(Italy) Friendly
132	England	27 February 1997	6–4	(England) Friendly
133	China	20 March 1997	2–2	(Germany) Friendly
134	China	23 March 1997	1–1	(Germany) Friendly
135	Spain	24 April 1997	6–0	(Germany) Friendly
136	Denmark	27 May 1997	2–2	(Denmark) Friendly
137	Norway	28 May 1997	0–3	(Norway) Friendly
138	Italy	30 June 1997	1–1	(Norway) Euro
139	Norway	3 July 1997	0–0	(Norway) Euro
140	Denmark	6 July 1997	2–0	(Norway) Euro
141	Sweden	9 July 1997	1–0	(Sweden) Euro SF
142	Italy	12 July 1997	2–0	(Norway) Euro Final
143	England	25 September 1997	3–0	(England) World Cup Q
144	United States	9 October 1997	3–1	(Germany) Friendly
145	United States	12 October 1997	0–3	(Germany) Friendly
146	Norway	6 November 1997	1–0	(Germany) World Cup Q
147	Netherlands	13 December 1997	0–1	(Netherlands) World Cup Q
148	Italy	5 February 1998	1–0	(Italy) Friendly
149	England	8 March 1998	1–0	(England) World Cup Q
150	Netherlands	2 April 1998	2–1	(Germany) World Cup Q
151	New Zealand	26 May 1998	4–1	(Germany) Friendly
152	New Zealand	28 May 1998	8–0	(Germany) Friendly
153	Norway	17 June 1998	2–3	(Norway) World Cup Q
154	United States	25 June 1998	1–1	(United States) Friendly
155	United States	28 June 1998	2–4	(United States) Friendly
156	Ukraine	17 September 1998	5–0	(Germany) World Cup Q
157	Ukraine	11, October 1998	1–1	(Ukraine) World Cup Q
158	Turkey	14 February 1999	12–1	(Turkey) Friendly
159	China	25 March 1999	0–3	(Germany) Friendly
160	China	28 March 1999	4–1	(Germany) Friendly
161	Denmark	22 April 1999	3–1	(Germany) Friendly
162	Switzerland	26 May 1999	2–0	(Germany) Friendly
163	France	30 May 1999	4–1	(Germany) Friendly
164	Netherlands	3 June 1999	2–0	(Germany) Friendly
165	Italy	21 June 1999	1–1	(United States) World Cup
166	Mexico	25 June 1999	6–0	(United States) World Cup
167	Brazil	27 June 1999	3–3	(United States) World Cup
168	United States	2 July 1999	3–2	(United States) World Cup QF
169	Russia	2 September 1999	3–1	(Germany) Friendly
170	Ukraine	23 September 1999	3–0	(Germany) Euro Q
171	Iceland	14 October 1999	5–0	(Germany) Euro Q
172	Italy	11 November 1999	4–4	(Italy) Euro Q

== 2000–2019 ==
=== 2000–2009 ===
2000–2009
173	Netherlands	16 March 2000	0–2	(Netherlands) Friendly
174	Italy	6 April 2000	3–0	(Germany) Euro Q
175	Ukraine	11 May 2000	6–1	(Ukraine) Euro Q
176	China	16 July 2000	1–3	(Germany) Friendly
177	Norway	19 July 2000	1–4	(Germany) Friendly
178	United States	22 July 2000	0–1	(Germany) Friendly
179	Iceland	17 August 2000	6–0	(Iceland) Euro Q
180	Denmark	27 August 2000	7–0	(Germany) Friendly
181	Australia	13 September 2000	3–0	(Australia) Olympics
182	Brazil	16 September 2000	2–1	(Australia) Olympics
183	Sweden	19 September 2000	1–0	(Australia) Olympics
184	Norway	24 September 2000	0–1	(Australia) Olympics SF
185	Brazil	28 September 2000	2–0	(Australia) Olympics 3rd Place
186	China	6 March 2001	1–0	(Germany) Friendly
187	China	8 March 2001	2–4	(Germany) Friendly
188	Italy	10 May 2001	1–0	(Germany) Friendly
189	Russia	17 May 2001	1–1	(Germany) Friendly
190	Canada	14 June 2001	3–0	(Germany) Friendly
191	Canada	17 June 2001	7–1	(Germany) Friendly
192	Sweden	23 June 2001	3–1	(Germany) Euro
193	Russia	27 June 2001	5–0	(Germany) Euro
194	England	30 June 2001	3–0	(Germany) Euro
195	Norway	4 July 2001	1–0	(Germany) Euro SF
196	Sweden	7 July 2001	1–0 aet	(Germany) Euro F
197	Japan	8 September 2001	1–0	(United States) Friendly
198	United States	9 September 2001	1–4	(United States) Friendly
199	England	27 September 2001	3–1	(Germany)
200	Portugal	25 October 2001	9–0	(Germany) World Cup Q
201	Netherlands	17 November 2001	3–0	(Germany) World Cup Q
202	China	23 January 2002	1–2	(China) Four Nations Tournament
203	United States	25 January 2002	0–0	(China) Four Nations Tournament
204	Norway	27 January 2002	3–1	(China) Four Nations Tournament
205	Denmark	1 March 2002	3–0	(Portugal) Algarve Cup
206	China	3 March 2002	2–4	(Portugal) Algarve Cup
207	Finland	5 March 2002	2–0	(Portugal) Algarve Cup
208	Sweden	7 March 2002	1–2	(Portugal) Algarve Cup
209	Netherlands	18 April 2002	6–0	(Germany) World Cup Q
210	Portugal	4 May 2002	8–0	(Portugal) World Cup Q
211	England	19 May 2002	1–0	(England) World Cup Q
212	Norway	14 September 2002	3–1	(Norway) Friendly
213	Denmark	17 October 2002	2–0	(Germany) Friendly
214	Russia	14 November 2002	4–0	(Germany) Friendly
215	China	23 January 2003	0–0	(China) Four Nations Tournament
216	Norway	26 January 2003	2–2	(China) Four Nations Tournament
217	United States	29 January 2003	0–1	(China) Four Nations Tournament
218	China	4 March 2003	2–2	(Germany) Friendly
219	China	6 March 2003	3–1	(Germany) Friendly
220	Scotland	27 March 2003	5–0	(Germany) Euro Q
221	France	17 April 2003	0–1	(France) Friendly
222	Denmark	22 May 2003	1–1	(Germany) Friendly
223	Denmark	25 May 2003	6–2	(Denmark) Friendly
224	Nigeria	6 August 2003	3–0	(Germany) Friendly
225	Ukraine	9 August 2003	3–1	(Ukraine) Euro Q
226	Czech Republic	28 August 2003	4–0	(Germany) Euro Q
227	England	11 September 2003	4–0	(Germany) Friendly
228	Canada	20 September 2003	4–1	(United States) World Cup
229	Japan	24 September 2003	3–0	(United States) World Cup
230	Argentina	27 September 2003	6–1	(United States) World Cup
231	Russia	3 October 2003	7–1	(United States) World Cup QF
232	United States	6 October 2003	3–0	(United States) World Cup SF
233	Sweden	12 October 2003	2–1 aet	(United States) World Cup Final
234	Portugal	15 November 2003	13–0	(Germany) Euro Q
235	Portugal	7 February 2004	11–0	(Portugal) Euro Q
236	China	4 March 2004	0–1	(Germany) Friendly
237	Italy	31 March 2004	1–0	(Italy) Friendly
238	Ukraine	28 April 2004	6–0	(Germany) Euro Q
239	Scotland	2 May 2004	3–1	(Scotland) Euro Q
240	Norway	21 July 2004	0–1	(Germany) Friendly
241	Nigeria	24 July 2004	3–1	(Germany) Friendly
242	China	11 August 2004	8–0	(Greece) Olympics
243	Mexico	17 August 2004	2–0	(Greece) Olympics
244	Nigeria	20 August 2004	2–1	(Greece) Olympics QF
245	United States	23 August 2004	1–2 aet	(Greece) Olympics SF
246	Sweden	26 August 2004	1–0	(Greece) Olympics 3rd Place
247	Czech Republic	25 September 2004	5–0	(Czech Republic) Euro Q
248	Netherlands	14 October 2004	0–0	(Germany) Friendly
249	Australia	28 January 2005	0–1	(China) Four Nations Tournament
250	Russia	30 January 2005	1–0	(China) Four Nations Tournament
251	China	1 February 2005	2–0	(China) Four Nations Tournament
252	Sweden	9 March 2005	2–1	(Portugal) Algarve Cup
253	Norway	11 March 2005	4–0	(Portugal) Algarve Cup
254	China	13 March 2005	2–0	(Portugal) Algarve Cup
255	United States	15 March 2005	0–1	(Portugal) Algarve Cup Final
256	Canada	21 April 2005	3–1	(Germany) Friendly
257	Canada	24 April 2005	3–2	(Germany) Friendly
258	Norway	6 June 2005	1–0	(England) Euro
259	Italy	9 June 2005	4–0	(England) Euro
260	France	12 June 2005	3–0	(England) Euro
261	Finland	15 June 2005	4–1	(England) Euro SF
262	Norway	19 June 2005	3–1	(England) Euro Final
263	Canada	1 September 2005	3–1	(Canada) Friendly
264	Canada	4 September 2005	4–3	(Canada) Friendly
265	Russia	25 September 2005	5–1	(Germany) World Cup Q
266	Scotland	20 October 2005	4–0	(Germany) World Cup Q
267	Switzerland	12 November 2005	4–0	(Germany) World Cup Q
268	China	1 March 2006	0–1	(Germany) Friendly
269	Finland	9 March 2006	5–0	(Portugal) Algarve Cup
270	Sweden	11 March 2006	3–0	(Portugal) Algarve Cup
271	Norway	13 March 2006	1–0	(Portugal) Algarve Cup
272	United States	15 March 2006	0(4)-0(3)	(Portugal) Algarve Cup Final
273	Republic of Ireland	10 May 2006	1–0	(Germany) World Cup Qualifying
274	Italy	3 August 2006	5–0	(Germany) Friendly
275	Republic of Ireland	26 August 2006	3–0	(Republic of Ireland) World Cup Qualifying
276	Switzerland	30 August 2006	6–0	(Switzerland) World Cup Qualifying
277	Scotland	23 September 2006	5–0	(Scotland) World Cup Qualifying
278	Russia	27 September 2006	3–2	(Russia) World Cup Qualifying
279	England	25 October 2006	5–1	(Germany) Friendly
280	Japan	23 November 2006	6–3	(Germany) Friendly
281	United States	26 January 2007	0–0	(China) Four Nations Tournament
282	China	28 January 2007	0–0	(China) Four Nations Tournament
283	England	30 January 2007	0–0	(China) Four Nations Tournament
284	Norway	7 March 2007	1–2	(Portugal) Algarve Cup
285	France	9 March 2007	0–1	(Portugal) Algarve Cup
286	Denmark	12 March 2007	3–0	(Portugal) Algarve Cup
287	Italy	14 March 2007	0–1	(Portugal) Algarve Cup
288	Netherlands	12 April 2007	5–1	(Germany) Euro Q
289	Wales	10 May 2007	6–0	(Wales) Euro Q
290	Denmark	29 July 2007	4–0	(Germany) Friendly
291	Czech Republic	2 August 2007	5–0	(Germany) Friendly
292	Switzerland	22 August 2007	7–0	(Germany) Euro Q
293	Norway	30 August 2007	2–2	(Germany) Friendly
294	Argentina	10 September 2007	11–0	(China) World Cup
295	England	14 September 2007	0–0	(China) World Cup
296	Japan	17 September 2007	2–0	(China) World Cup
297	North Korea	22 September 2007	3–0	(China) World Cup QF
298	Norway	26 September 2007	3–0	(China) World Cup SF
299	Brazil	30 September 2007	2–0	(China) World Cup Final
300	Belgium	28 October 2007	3–0	(Germany) Euro Q
301	Netherlands	1 November 2007	1–0	(Netherlands) Euro Q
302	China	28 February 2008	2–0	(Germany) Friendly
303	Denmark	5 March 2008	0–1	(Portugal) Algarve Cup
304	Finland	7 March 2008	3–0	(Portugal) Algarve Cup
305	Sweden	10 March 2008	2–0	(Portugal) Algarve Cup
306	Norway	12 March 2008	-	(Portugal) Algarve Cup
307	Belgium	7 May 2008	5–0	(Belgium) Euro Q
308	Wales	29 May 2008	4–0	(Germany) Euro Q
309	England	17 July 2008	3–0	(Germany) Friendly
310	Norway	23 July 2008	0–2	(Norway) Friendly
311	Brazil	6 August 2008	0–0	(China) Olympics
312	Nigeria	9 August 2008	1–0	(China) Olympics
313	North Korea	12 August 2008	1–0	(China) Olympics
314	Sweden	15 August 2008	2–0 aet	(China) Olympic Quarterfinal
315	Brazil	18 August 2008	1–4	(China) Olympic Semi-final
316	Japan	21 August 2008	2–0	(China) Olympic Bronze Medal Match
317	Switzerland	1 October 2008	3–0	(Switzerland) Euro Q
318	China	25 February 2009	1–1	(Germany) Friendly
319	Finland	4 March 2009	2–0	(Portugal) Algarve Cup
320	China	6 March 2009	3–0	(Portugal) Algarve Cup
321	Sweden	9 March 2009	2–3	(Portugal) Algarve Cup
322	Denmark	11 March 2009	0–1	(Portugal) Algarve Cup
323	Brazil	22 April 2009	1–1	(Germany) Friendly
324	Netherlands	25 July 2009	6–0	(Germany) Friendly
325	Japan	29 July 2009	0–0	(Germany) Friendly
326	Russia	6 August 2009	3–1	(Germany) Friendly
327	Norway	24 August 2009	4–0	(Finland) Euro
328	France	27 August 2009	5–1	(Finland) Euro
329	Iceland	30 August 2009	1–0	(Finland) Euro
330	Italy	4 September 2009	2–1	(Finland) Euro QF
331	Norway	7 September 2009	3–1	(Finland) Euro SF
332	England	10 September 2009	6–2	(Finland) Euro Final
333	United States	29 October 2009	0–1	(Germany) Friendly

=== 2010–2019 ===
2010–2019
334	North Korea	17 February 2010	3–0	(Germany) Friendly
335	Denmark	24 February 2010	4–0	(Portugal) Algarve Cup
336	Finland	26 February 2010	7–0	(Portugal) Algarve Cup
337	China	1 March 2010	5–0	(Portugal) Algarve Cup
338	United States	3 March 2010	2–3	(Portugal) Algarve Cup Final
339	United States	22 May 2010	0–4	(United States) Friendly
340	Canada	15 September 2010	5–0	(Germany) Friendly
341	Australia	28 October 2010	2–1	(Germany) Friendly
342	Nigeria	25 November 2010	8–0	(Germany) Friendly
343	North Korea	21 May 2011	2–0	(Germany) Friendly
344	Italy	3 June 2011	5–0	(Germany) Friendly
345	Netherlands	7 June 2011	5–0	(Germany) Friendly
346	Norway	16 June 2011	3–0	(Germany) Friendly
347	Canada	26 June 2011	2–1	(Germany) World Cup
348	Nigeria	30 June 2011	1–0	(Germany) World Cup
349	France	5 July 2011	4–2	(Germany) World Cup
350	Japan	9 July 2011	0–1 aet	(Germany) World Cup QF
351	Switzerland	17 September 2011	4–1	(Germany) Euro Q
352	Romania	22 October 2011	3–0	(Romania) Euro Q
353	Sweden	26 October 2011	1–0	(Germany) Friendly
354	Kazakhstan	19 November 2011	17–0	(Germany) Euro Q
355	Spain	24 November 2011	2–2	(Spain) Euro Q
356	Turkey	15 February 2012	5–0	(Turkey) Euro Q
357	Iceland	29 February 2012	1–0	(Portugal) Algarve Cup
358	China	2 March 2012	1–0	(Portugal) Algarve Cup
359	Sweden	5 March 2012	4–0	(Portugal) Algarve Cup
360	Japan	7 March 2012	4–3	(Portugal) Algarve Cup Final
361	Spain	31 March 2012	5–0	(Germany) Euro Q
362	Switzerland	5 April 2012	6–0	(Switzerland) Euro Q
363	Romania	31 May 2012	5–0	(Germany) Euro Q
364	Kazakhstan	15 September 2012	7–0	(Kazakhstan) Euro Q
365	Turkey	19 September 2012	10–0	(Germany) Euro Q
366	United States	20 October 2012	1–1	(United States) Friendly
367	United States	24 October 2012	2–2	(United States) Friendly
368	France	29 November 2012	1–1	(Germany) Friendly
369	France	13 February 2013	3–3	(France) Friendly
370	Denmark	6 March 2013	0–0	(Portugal) Algarve Cup
371	Japan	8 March 2013	2–1	(Portugal) Algarve Cup
372	Norway	11 March 2013	2–0	(Portugal) Algarve Cup
373	United States	13 March 2013	0–2	(Portugal) Algarve Cup Final
374	United States	5 April 2013	3–3	(Germany) Friendly
375	Scotland	15 June 2013	3–0	(Germany) Friendly
376	Canada	19 June 2013	1–0	(Germany) Friendly
377	Japan	29 June 2013	4–2	(Germany) Friendly
378	Netherlands	11 July 2013	0–0	(Sweden) Euro
379	Iceland	14 July 2013	3–0	(Sweden) Euro
380	Norway	17 July 2013	0–1	(Sweden) Euro
381	Italy	21 July 2013	1–0	(Sweden) Euro QF
382	Sweden	24 July 2013	1–0	(Sweden) Euro SF
383	Norway	28 July 2013	1–0	(Sweden) Euro Final
384	Russia	21 September 2013	9–0	(Germany) World Cup Q
385	Slovenia	26 October 2013	13–0	(Slovenia) World Cup Q
386	Croatia	30 October 2013	4–0	(Germany) World Cup Q
387	Slovakia	23 November 2013	6–0	(Slovakia) World Cup Q
388	Croatia	27 November 2013	8–0	(Croatia) World Cup Q
389	Iceland	5 March 2014	5–0	(Portugal) Algarve Cup
390	China	7 March 2014	1–0	(Portugal) Algarve Cup
391	Norway	10 March 2014	3–1	(Portugal) Algarve Cup
392	Japan	12 March 2014	3–0	(Portugal) Algarve Cup Final
393	Republic of Ireland	5 April 2014	3–2	(Republic of Ireland) World Cup Q
394	Slovenia	10 April 2014	4–0	(Germany) World Cup Q
395	Slovakia	8 May 2014	9–1	(Germany) World Cup Q
396	Canada	19 June 2014	2–1	(Canada) Friendly
397	Russia	13 September 2014	4–1	(Russia) World Cup Q
398	Republic of Ireland	17 September 2014	2–0	(Germany) World Cup Q
399	France	25 October 2014	0–2	(Germany) Friendly
400	Sweden	29 October 2014	2–1	(Sweden) Friendly
401	England	23 November 2014	3–0	(England) Friendly
402	Sweden	4 March 2015	2–4	(Portugal) Algarve Cup
403	China	6 March 2015	2–0	(Portugal) Algarve Cup
404	Brazil	9 March 2015	3–1	(Portugal) Algarve Cup
405	Sweden	11 March 2015	2–1	(Portugal) Algarve Cup
406	Brazil	8 April 2015	4–0	(Germany) Friendly
407	Switzerland	27 May 2015	3–1	(Switzerland) Friendly
408	Ivory Coast	7 June 2015	10–0	(Canada) World Cup
409	Norway	11 June 2015	1–1	(Canada) World Cup
410	Thailand	15 June 2015	4–0	(Canada) World Cup
411	Sweden	20 June 2015	4–1	(Canada) World Cup R16
412	France	26 June 2015	1(5)-1(4)	(Canada) World Cup QF
413	United States	30 June 2015	0–2	(Canada) World Cup SF
414	England	4 July 2015	0–1 aet	(Canada) World Cup 3rd Place Match
415	Hungary	18 September 2015	12–0	(Germany) Euro Q
416	Croatia	22 September 2015	1–0	(Croatia) Euro Q
417	Russia	22 October 2015	2–0	(Germany) Euro Q
418	Turkey	25 October 2015	7–0	(Germany) Euro Q
419	England	26 November 2015	0–0	(Germany) Friendly
420	France	3 March 2016	1–0	(United States) SheBelieves Cup
421	England	6 March 2016	2–1	(United States) SheBelieves Cup
422	United States	10 March 2016	1–2	(United States) SheBelieves Cup
423	Turkey	8 April 2016	6–0	(Turkey) Euro Q
424	Croatia	12 April 2016	2–0	(Germany) Euro Q
425	Ghana	22 July 2016	11–0	(United States) Friendly
426	Zimbabwe	3 August 2016	6–1	(Brazil) Olympics
427	Australia	6 August 2016	2–2	(Brazil) Olympics
428	Canada	9 August 2016	1–2	(Brazil) Olympics
429	China	12 August 2016	1–0	(Brazil) Olympics QF
430	Canada	16 August 2016	2–0	(Brazil) Olympics SF
431	Sweden	19 August 2016	2–1	(Brazil) Olympics Final
432	Russia	16 September 2016	4–0	(Russia) Euro Q
433	Hungary	20 September 2016	1–0	(Hungary) Euro Q
434	Austria	22 October 2016	4–2	(Germany) Friendly
435	Netherlands	25 October 2016	4–2	(Germany) Friendly
436	Norway	29 November 2016	1–1	(Germany) Friendly
437	United States	1 March 2017	0–1	(United States) SheBelieves Cup
438	France	4 March 2017	0–0	(United States) SheBelieves Cup
439	England	7 March 2017	1–0	(United States) SheBelieves Cup
450	Canada	9 April 2017	2–1	(Germany) Friendly
451	Brazil	4 July 2017	3–1	(Germany) Friendly
452	Sweden	17 July 2017	0–0	(Netherlands) Euro
453	Italy	21 July 2017	2–1	(Netherlands) Euro
454	Russia	25 July 2017	2–0	(Netherlands) Euro
455	Denmark	30 July 2017	1–2	(Netherlands) Euro QF
456	Slovenia	16 September 2017	6–0	(Germany) World Cup Q
457	Czech Republic	19 September 2017	1–0	(Czech Republic) World Cup Q
458	Iceland	20 October 2017	2–3	(Germany) World Cup Q
459	Faroe Islands	24 October 2017	11–0	(Germany) World Cup Q
460	France	24 November 2017	4–0	(Germany) World Cup Q
461	United States	2 March 2018	0–1	(United States) SheBelieves Cup
462	England	4 March 2018	2–2	(United States) SheBelieves Cup
463	France	7 March 2018	0–3	(United States) SheBelieves Cup
464	Czech Republic	7 April 2018	4–0	(Germany) World Cup Q
465	Slovenia	10 April 2018	4–0	(Slovenia) World Cup Q
466	Canada	10 June 2018	3–2	(Canada) Friendly
467	Iceland	1 September 2018	2–0	(Iceland) World Cup Q
468	Faroe Islands	4 September 2018	8–0	(Faroe Islands) World Cup Q
469	Austria	6 October 2018	3–1	(Germany) Friendly
470	Italy	10 November 2018	5–2	(Germany) Friendly
471	Spain	13 November 2018	0–0	(Germany) Friendly
472	France	28 February 2019	1–0	(France) Friendly
473	Sweden	6 April 2019	2–1	(Sweden) Friendly
474	Japan	9 April 2019	2–2	(Germany) Friendly
475	Chile	30 May 2019	2–0	(Germany) Friendly
476	China	8 June 2019	1–0	(France) World Cup
477	Spain	12 June 2019	1–0	(France) World Cup
478	South Africa	17 June 2019	4–0	(France) World Cup
479	Nigeria	22 June 2019	3–0	(France) World Cup R16
480	Sweden	29 June 2019	1–2	(France) World Cup QF
481	Montenegro	31 August 2019	10–0	(Germany) Euro Q
482	Ukraine	3 September 2019	8–0	(Ukraine) Euro Q
483	Ukraine	5 October 2019	8–0	(Germany) Euro Q
484	Greece	8 October 2019	5–0	(Greece) Euro Q
485	England	9 November 2019	2–1	(England) Friendly

== 2020–2039 ==
=== 2020–2029 ===
2020–2029
Win Draw Defeat
486	Sweden	4 March 2020	1–0	(Portugal) Algarve Cup
487	Norway	7 March 2020	4–0	(Portugal) Algarve Cup
488	Republic of Ireland	19 September 2020	3–0	(Germany) Euro Q
489	Montenegro	22 September 2020	3–0	(Montenegro) Euro Q
490	Greece	27 November 2020	6–0	(Germany) Euro Q
491	Republic of Ireland	1 December 2020	3–1	(Republic of Ireland) Euro Q
492	Belgium	21 February 2021	2–0	(Germany) Friendly
493	Netherlands	24 February 2021	1–2	(Netherlands) Friendly
494	Australia	10 April 2021	5–2	(Germany) Friendly
495	Norway	13 April 2021	3–1	(Germany) Friendly
496	France	10 June 2021	0–1	(France) Friendly
497	Chile	15 June 2021	0–0	(Germany) Friendly
498	Bulgaria	18 September 2021	7–0	(Germany) World Cup Q
499	Serbia	21 September 2021	5–1	(Germany) World Cup Q
500	Israel	21 October 2021	1–0	(Israel) World Cup Q
501	Israel	26 October 2021	7–0	(Germany) World Cup Q
502	Turkey	26 November 2021	8–0	(Germany) World Cup Q
503	Portugal	30 November 2021	3–1	(Portugal) World Cup Q
504	Spain	17 February 2022	1–1	(England) Arnold Clark Cup
505	Canada	20 February 2022	0–1	(England) Arnold Clark Cup
506	England	23 February 2022	1–3	(England) Arnold Clark Cup
507	Portugal	9 April 2022	3–0	(Germany) World Cup Q
508	Serbia	12 April 2022	2–3	(Serbia) World Cup Q
509	Switzerland	24 June 2022	7–0	(Germany) Friendly
510	Denmark	8 July 2022	4–0	(England) Euro 2022
511	Spain	12 July 2022	2–0	(England) Euro 2022
512	Finland	16 July 2022	3–0	(England) Euro 2022
513	Austria	21 July 2022	2–0	(England) Euro 2022 QF
514	France	27 July 2022	2–1	(England) Euro 2022 SF
515	England	31 July 2022	1–2 aet	(England) Euro 2022 F
516	Turkey	3 September 2022	3–0	(Turkey) World Cup Q
517	Bulgaria	6 September 2022	8–0	(Bulgaria) World Cup Q
518	France	7 October 2022	2–1	(Germany) Friendly
519	United States	10 November 2022	2–1	(United States) Friendly
520	United States	13 November 2022	1–2	(United States) Friendly
521	Sweden	21 February 2023	0–0	(Germany) Friendly
522	Netherlands	7 April 2023	1–0	(Netherlands) Friendly
523	Brazil	11 April 2023	1–2	(Germany) Friendly
524	Vietnam	24 June 2023	2–1	(Germany) Friendly
525	Zambia	7 July 2023	2–3	(Germany) Friendly
526	Morocco	24 July 2023	6–0	(Australia) 2023 World Cup
527	Colombia	30 July 2023	1–2	(Australia) 2023 World Cup
528	South Korea	3 August 2023	1–1	(Australia) 2023 World Cup
529	Denmark	22 September 2023	0–2	(Denmark) Nations League
530	Iceland	26 September 2023	4–0	(Germany) Nations League
531	Wales	27 October 2023	5–1	(Germany) Nations League
532	Iceland	31 October 2023	2–0	(Iceland) Nations League
533	Denmark	1 December 2023	3–0	(Germany) Nations League
534	Wales	5 December 2023	0–0	(Wales) Nations League
535	France	23 February 2024	1–2	(France) Nations League
536	Netherlands	28 February 2024	2–0	(Netherlands) Nations League
537	Austria	5 April 2024	3–2	(Austria) Euro Q
538	Iceland	9 April 2024	3–1	(Germany) Euro Q
539	Poland	31 May 2024	4–1	(Germany) Euro Q
540	Poland	4 June 2024	3–1	(Poland) Euro Q
541	Iceland	12 July 2024	0–3	(Iceland) Euro Q
542	Austria	16 July 2024	4–0	(Germany) Euro Q
543	Australia	25 July 2024	3–0	(France) 2024 Olympics
544	United States	28 July 2024	1–4	(France) 2024 Olympics
545	Zambia	31 July 2024	4–1	(France) 2024 Olympics
546	Canada	3 August 2024	0(4)–0(2)	(France) 2024 Olympics QF
547	United States	6 August 2024	0–1	(France) 2024 Olympics SF
548	Spain	9 August 2024	1–0	(France) 2024 Olympics 3rd
549	England	25 October 2024	4–3	(England) Friendly
550	Australia	28 October 2024	1–2	(Germany) Friendly
551	Switzerland	29 November 2024	6–0	(Switzerland) Friendly
552	Italy	2 December 2024	1–2	(Germany) Friendly
553	Netherlands	21 February 2025	2–2	(Netherlands) Nations League
554	Austria	25 February 2025	4–1	(Germany) Nations League
555	Scotland	4 April 2025	4–0	(Scotland) Nations League
556	Scotland	8 April 2025	6–1	(Germany) Nations League
557	Netherlands	30 May 2025	4–0	(Germany) Nations League
558	Austria	3 June 2025	6–0	(Austria) Nations League
559	Poland	4 July 2025	2–0	(Switzerland) Euro 2025
560	Denmark	8 July 2025	2–1	(Switzerland) Euro 2025
561	Sweden	12 July 2025	1–4	(Switzerland) Euro 2025
562	France	19 July 2025	1(6)–1(5)	(Switzerland) Euro 2025
563	Spain	23 July 2025	0–1	(Switzerland) Euro 2025
564	France	24 October 2025	1–0	(France) Nations League
565	France	28 October 2025	2–2	(Germany) Nations League
566	Spain	28 November 2025	0–0	(Germany) Nations League
567	Spain	2 December 2025	0–3	(Spain) Nations League
568	Slovenia	3 March 2026	5–0	(Germany) World Cup Q
569	Norway	7 March 2026	4–0	(Norway) World Cup Q
570	Austria	14 April 2026	5–1	(Germany) World Cup Q
571	Austria	18 April 2026	0–0	(Austria) World Cup Q
572	Norway	5 June 2026	2–0	(Germany) World Cup Q
573	Slovenia	9 June 2026	2–0	(Slovenia) World Cup Q
574	Australia	9 October 2026	4–2	(Germany) Friendly
575	Japan	13 October 2026	2–1	(Germany) Friendly
576	Argentina	29 November 2026		(Argentina) Friendly
577	Peru	4 December 2026		(Brazil) Friendly
578	Sweden	2 March 2027		(Sweden) Nations League
579	Scotland	6 March 2027		(Germany) Nations League
580	Netherlands	20 April 2027		(Germany) Nations League
581	Netherlands	24 April 2027		(Netherlands) Nations League
582	Scotland	11 June 2027		(Scotland) Nations League
583	Sweden	15 June 2027		(Germany) Nations League

== Head-to-head records ==
As of 13 October 2026

Opponent	GP	W	D	L	GF	GA	GD	First match	Most recent match	Win %
Argentina	2	2	0	0	17	1	+16	27 September 2003	10 September 2007	1.000
Australia	8	5	1	2	20	10	+10	13 September 2000	9 October 2026	.625
Austria	9	8	1	0	31	7	+24	22 October 2016	18 April 2026	.889
Belgium	7	4	2	1	14	5	+9	5 March 1983	21 February 2021	.571
Brazil	13	7	4	2	29	15	+14	9 June 1995	11 April 2023	.538
Bulgaria	5	5	0	0	26	2	+24	21 March 1989	6 September 2022	1.000
Canada	18	15	1	2	47	18	+29	27 July 1994	3 August 2024	.882
Chile	2	1	1	0	2	0	+2	30 May 2019	15 June 2021	.500
China	31	17	6	8	56	30	+26	30 June 1991	8 June 2019	.548
Chinese Taipei	1	1	0	0	3	0	+3	19 November 1991		1.000
Colombia	1	0	0	1	1	2	−1	30 July 2023		.000
Croatia	6	6	0	0	30	0	+30	2 June 1994	12 April 2016	1.000
Czechoslovakia	4	3	1	0	9	1	+8	26 November 1988	29 April 1990	.750
Czech Republic	5	5	0	0	19	0	+19	28 August 2003	7 April 2018	1.000
Denmark	26	15	4	7	54	22	+32	1 May 1983	8 July 2025	.577
England	29	22	4	3	71	24	+47	22 August 1984	25 October 2024	.759
Faroe Islands	2	2	0	0	19	0	+19	24 October 2017	4 September 2018	1.000
Finland	11	10	0	1	36	2	+34	3 October 1984	16 July 2022	.909
France	26	14	6	6	50	24	+26	16 May 1987	28 October 2025	.560
Ghana	1	1	0	0	11	0	+11	22 July 2016		1.000
Greece	2	2	0	0	11	0	+11	8 October 2019	27 November 2020	1.000
Hungary	9	7	1	1	26	2	+24	9 April 1985	20 September 2016	.778
Iceland	20	18	0	2	69	10	+59	27 August 1986	12 July 2024	.900
Israel	2	2	0	0	8	0	+8	21 October 2021	26 October 2021	1.000
Italy	29	16	8	5	54	23	+31	25 January 1984	2 December 2024	.552
Ivory Coast	1	1	0	0	10	0	+10	7 June 2015		1.000
Japan	15	12	2	1	35	15	+20	5 June 1995	13 October 2026	.800
Kazakhstan	2	2	0	0	24	0	+24	19 November 2011	15 September 2012	1.000
Morocco	1	1	0	0	6	0	+6	24 July 2023		1.000
Mexico	2	2	0	0	8	0	+8	25 June 1999	17 August 2004	1.000
Montenegro	2	2	0	0	13	0	+13	31 August 2019	22 September 2020	1.000
Netherlands	24	15	6	3	57	17	+40	19 March 1983	30 May 2025	.625
New Zealand	2	2	0	0	12	1	+11	26 May 1998	28 May 1998	1.000
Nigeria	8	8	0	0	25	2	+23	17 November 1991	22 June 2019	1.000
North Korea	4	4	0	0	9	0	+9	22 September 2007	21 May 2011	1.000
Norway	44	23	7	14	78	55	+23	2 May 1984	5 June 2026	.523
Poland	7	7	0	0	30	3	+27	9 May 1991	4 July 2024	1.000
Portugal	6	6	0	0	47	1	+46	25 October 2001	9 April 2022	1.000
Republic of Ireland	6	6	0	0	15	3	+12	10 May 2006	1 December 2020	1.000
Romania	2	2	0	0	8	0	+8	22 October 2011	31 May 2012	1.000
Russia	19	17	2	0	66	8	+58	11 October 1992	25 July 2017	.895
Scotland	7	7	0	0	30	2	+28	27 March 2003	8 April 2025	1.000
Serbia	2	1	0	1	7	4	+3	21 September 2021	12 April 2022	.500
Slovakia	4	4	0	0	20	1	+19	25 October 1995	8 May 2014	1.000
Slovenia	6	6	0	0	34	0	+34	26 October 2013	9 June 2026	1.000
South Africa	1	1	0	0	4	0	+4	17 June 2019		1.000
South Korea	1	0	1	0	1	1	0	3 August 2023		.000
Soviet Union	1	1	0	0	3	0	+3	7 August 1990		1.000
Spain	11	5	4	2	18	7	+11	24 April 1997	2 December 2025	.455
Sweden	32	21	2	9	55	39	+16	29 November 1991	12 July 2025	.656
Switzerland	19	18	1	0	88	4	+84	10 November 1982	29 November 2024	.947
Thailand	1	1	0	0	4	0	+4	15 June 2015		1.000
Turkey	7	7	0	0	51	1	+50	14 February 1999	3 September 2022	1.000
Ukraine	8	7	1	0	40	3	+37	17 September 1998	5 October 2019	.875
United States	40	6	7	27	38	81	−43	22 July 1988	6 August 2024	.150
Vietnam	1	1	0	0	2	1	+1	24 June 2023		1.000
Wales	6	5	1	0	39	1	+38	31 March 1994	5 December 2023	.833
FR Yugoslavia	1	1	0	0	3	0	+3	28 May 1992		1.000
Zambia	2	1	0	1	6	4	+2	7 July 2023	31 July 2024	.500
Zimbabwe	1	1	0	0	6	1	+5	3 August 2016		1.000
