= Four Nations Women's Football Tournament =

Four Nations Tournament
- Founded: 1998
- Region: China
- Teams: 4
- Current champions: China (7th title)
- Most championships: China (7 titles); United States (7 titles)
- 2019 Four Nations Tournament

The Four Nations Tournament (Chinese: 中国四国女足邀请赛) is an invitational women's football tournament taking place in various cities of China since 1998. Since 2002, it has been held every year except for 2010. United States, Norway, China, North Korea, and Canada are the only winners of various editions of this tournament. The United States and China have been the most successful, winning seven editions of the tournament.

== Results ==
#	Years	Hosts	Winners	Runners-up	Third Place	Fourth Place
1	1998; Details	(China); Guangzhou	United States	Norway	China	Sweden
2	2002; Details	(China); Guangzhou	Norway	Germany	United States	China
3	2003; Details	(China); Yiwu, Wuhan, Shanghai	United States	China	Germany	Norway
4	2004; Details	(China); Shenzhen	United States	China	Sweden	Canada
5	2005; Details	(China); Quanzhou	China	Australia	Germany	Russia
6	2006; Details	(China); Guangzhou	United States	China	France	Norway
7	2007; Details	(China); Guangzhou	United States	China	Germany	England
8	2008; Details	(China); Guangzhou	United States	China	Canada	Finland
9	2009; Details	(China); Guangzhou	China	Korea Republic	Finland	New Zealand
10	2011; Details	(China); Chongqing	United States	Canada	Sweden	China
11	2012; Details	(China); Chongqing	North Korea	China	South Korea	Mexico
12	2013; Details	(China); Chongqing	Norway	Canada	China	Korea Republic
13	2014; Details	(China); Chongqing	China	North Korea	Mexico	New Zealand
14	2015; Details	(China); Shenzhen	Canada	South Korea	Mexico	China
15	2016; Details	(China); Shenzhen	China	Mexico	South Korea	Vietnam
16	2017; Details	(China); Foshan	China	Thailand	Ukraine	Myanmar
17	2018; Details	(China); Foshan	China	Thailand	Colombia	Vietnam
18	2019; Details	(China); Meizhou	China	South Korea	Nigeria	Romania

== Performance by team ==
Teams	Part	1st place, gold medalist(s)	2nd place, silver medalist(s)	3rd place, bronze medalist(s)	4th
China	18	7	6	2	3
United States	8	7	0	1	0
Norway	5	2	1	0	2
Canada	5	1	2	1	1
North Korea	2	1	1	0	0
South Korea	6	0	3	2	1
Thailand	2	0	2	0	0
Germany	4	0	1	3	0
Mexico	4	0	1	2	1
Australia	1	0	1	0	0
Sweden	3	0	0	2	1
Finland	2	0	0	1	1
France	1	0	0	1	0
Ukraine	1	0	0	1	0
Colombia	1	0	0	1	0
Nigeria	1	0	0	1	0
New Zealand	2	0	0	0	2
Vietnam	2	0	0	0	2
England	1	0	0	0	1
Russia	1	0	0	0	1
Myanmar	1	0	0	0	1
Romania	1	0	0	0	1
Total (22 teams)	72	18	18	18	18

== Summary (1998-2019) ==
Rank	Team	Part	M	W	D	L	GF	GA	GD	Points
1	China	18	53	28	12	13	82	38	+44	96
2	United States	8	24	16	5	3	39	10	+29	51
3	South Korea	5	15	7	1	7	25	21	+4	22
4	Norway	5	15	6	4	5	19	21	–2	22
5	Canada	5	15	6	3	6	16	22	–6	21
6	Germany	4	12	3	6	3	9	7	+2	15
7	North Korea	2	6	4	1	1	5	1	+4	13
8	Mexico	5	15	3	2	7	10	15	–5	11
9	Thailand	2	6	3	1	2	8	5	+3	10
10	Sweden	3	9	2	1	6	10	19	–9	7
11	Australia	1	3	2	0	1	6	3	+3	6
12	Colombia	1	3	1	1	1	3	3	0	4
13	Finland	2	6	1	1	4	4	12	–8	4
14	France	1	3	0	3	0	2	2	0	3
15	Ukraine	1	3	1	0	2	4	6	–2	3
16	England	1	3	0	2	1	1	3	–2	2
17	Russia	1	3	0	0	3	1	9	–8	0
18	Myanmar	1	3	0	0	3	0	9	–9	0
19	New Zealand	2	6	0	0	6	4	16	–12	0
20	Vietnam	2	6	0	0	6	0	22	–22	0

== See also ==
- FIFA Women's World Cup
- Football at the Summer Olympics (Women's tournament)
- Algarve Cup
- Arnold Clark Cup
- China Cup
- Cup of Nations
- Cyprus Women's Cup
- Four Nations Tournament
- Istria Cup
- Pinatar Cup
- SheBelieves Cup
- Tournament of Nations
- Tournoi de France
- Turkish Women's Cup
- Women's Revelations Cup
- Yongchuan International Tournament
