= Germany national football team honours =

Titles and honours awarded to the Germany national football team

The Germany national football team (German: Deutsche Fußballnationalmannschaft or Die Mannschaft) has represented Germany in men's international football since 1908. The team is governed by the German Football Association (Deutscher Fußball-Bund), founded in 1900. Ever since the DFB was reinaugurated in 1949 the team has represented the Federal Republic of Germany. Under Allied occupation and division, two other separate national teams were also recognised by FIFA: the Saarland team representing the Saarland (1950–1956) and the East German team representing the German Democratic Republic (1952–1990). Both have been absorbed along with their records by the current national team. The official name and code "Germany FR (FRG)" was shortened to "Germany (GER)" following the reunification in 1990.

Germany is one of the most successful national teams in international competitions, having won four World Cups (1954, 1974, 1990, 2014), three European Championships (1972, 1980, 1996), and one Confederations Cup (2017). They have also been runners-up three times in the European Championships, four times in the World Cup, and a further four third-place finishes at World Cups. East Germany won Olympic Gold in 1976.

Germany and Spain are the only nations to have won both the FIFA World Cup and the FIFA Women's World Cup. At the end of the 2014 World Cup, Germany earned the highest Elo rating of any national football team in history, with a record 2,205 points. Germany is also the only European nation that has won a FIFA World Cup in the Americas.

== Men's Honours ==
=== Major competitions ===
FIFA World Cup

- Champions (4): 1954, 1974, 1990, 2014
- Runners-up (4): 1966, 1982, 1986, 2002
- Third place (4): 1934, 1970, 2006, 2010
- Fourth place (1): 1958

UEFA European Championship

- Champions (3): 1972, 1980, 1996
- Runners-up (3): 1976, 1992, 2008
- Third place (3): 1988, 2012, 2016

Summer Olympic Games

- Gold Medal (1): 1976 (East Germany)
- Silver Medal (2): 1980 (East Germany), 2016 (Germany)
- Bronze Medal (3): 1964, 1972 (East Germany), 1988 (West Germany)
- Fourth Place (1): 1952 (West Germany)

FIFA Confederations Cup

- Champions (1): 2017
- Third place (1): 2005

Nations League Finals:

- Fourth Place :2025

Overview
Event	1st place	2nd place	3rd place	4th place
FIFA World Cup	4	4	4	1
UEFA European Championship	3	3	3	0
Summer Olympic Games	1	2	3	1
FIFA Confederations Cup	1	0	1	0
UEFA Nations League	0	0	0	1
Total	9	9	11	3

=== Minor competitions ===
U.S. Cup

- Champions (1): 1993

Swiss Centenary Tournament

- Champions (1): 1995

Four Nations Tournament

- Third place (1): 1988

Azteca 2000 Tournament

- Third place (1): 1985

=== Awards ===
FIFA Team of the Year

- Winners (3): 1993, 2014, 2017

FIFA World Cup Fair Play Trophy

- Winners (1): 1974

FIFA World Cup Most Entertaining Team

- Winners (1): 2010

FIFA Confederations Cup Fair Play Award

- Winners (1): 2017

Laureus World Sports Award for Team of the Year

- Winners (1): 2015

World Soccer World Team of the Year

- Winners (2): 1990, 2014

Gazzetta Sports World Team of the Year

- Winners (3): 1980, 1990, 2014

German Sports Team of the Year

- Winners (10): 1966, 1970, 1974, 1980, 1990, 1996, 2002, 2006, 2010, 2014

Unofficial Football World Championships

- Winners: 31 times

Silbernes Lorbeerblatt

- Winners (7): 1954, 1972, 1974, 1980, 1990, 1996, 2014

Bambi Award

- Winners (2): 1986, 1996

Deutscher Fernsehpreis

- Winners (1): 2010

Golden Hen

- Winners (3): 2006, 2010, 2014

== Women's Honours ==
=== Major competitions ===
FIFA Women's World Cup

- Champions (2): 2003, 2007
- Runners-up (1): 1995
- Fourth Place (2): 1991, 2015

UEFA Women's European Championship

- Champions (8): 1989, 1991, 1995, 1997, 2001, 2005, 2009, 2013
- Runners-up (1): 2022
- Fourth Place (1): 1993

Summer Olympic Games

- Gold Medal (1): 2016
- Bronze Medal (4): 2000, 2004, 2008, 2024

UEFA Women's Nations League

- Runners-up (1): 2025
- Third Place (1): 2024

Overview
Event	1st place	2nd place	3rd place	4th place
FIFA Women's World Cup	2	1	0	2
UEFA Women's Championship	8	1	0	1
Summer Olympic Games	1	0	4	0
UEFA Women's Nations League	0	1	1	0
Total	11	3	5	3

=== Minor competitions ===
Algarve Cup

- Champions (4): 2006, 2012, 2014, 2020
- Runners-up (3): 2005, 2010, 2013
- Third place (1): 2015
- Fourth place (3): 2002, 2008, 2009

Women's World Invitational Tournament

- Champions (2): 1981, (Note: by Bergisch Gladbach (women)) 1984 (Note: by Bergisch Gladbach (women))
- Third place (1): 1987 (Note: by Bergisch Gladbach (women))

SheBelieves Cup

- Runners-up (2): 2016, 2017
- Fourth place (1): 2018

Four Nations Tournament

- Runners-up (1): 2002
- Third place (3): 2003, 2005, 2007

Mundialito Cup

- Runners-up (1): 1984

Arnold Clark Cup

- Fourth place (1): 2022

=== Awards ===
FIFA Women's World Cup Fair Play Trophy

- Winners (1): 1991

FIFA Women's World Cup Most Entertaining Team

- Winners (1): 2003

German Sports Team of the Year

- Winners (2): 2003, 2009

Silbernes Lorbeerblatt

- Winners (11): 1989, 1991, 1995, 1997, 2001, 2003, 2005, 2007, 2009, 2013, 2016

Bambi Award

- Winners (2): 2003, 2007

== Notes ==
Awards and achievements
Preceded by 1950 Uruguay	World Champions; 1954 (First title)	Succeeded by 1958 Brazil
Preceded by 1970 Brazil	World Champions; 1974 (Second title)	Succeeded by 1978 Argentina
Preceded by 1986 Argentina	World Champions; 1990 (Third title)	Succeeded by 1994 Brazil
Preceded by 2010 Spain	World Champions; 2014 (Fourth title)	Succeeded by 2018 France
Preceded by 1968 Italy	European Champions; 1972 (First title)	Succeeded by 1976 Czechoslovakia
Preceded by 1976 Czechoslovakia	European Champions; 1980 (Second title)	Succeeded by 1984 France
Preceded by 1992 Denmark	European Champions; 1996 (Third title)	Succeeded by 2000 France
Preceded by 1972 Poland	Summer Olympics; 1976 (First title)	Succeeded by 1980 Czechoslovakia
Preceded by 2013 Brazil	Confederations Champions; 2017 (First title)	Succeeded by abolished
Awards
Preceded by Award established	FIFA Team of the Year; 1993	Succeeded by Brazil
Preceded by Spain	FIFA Team of the Year; 2014	Succeeded by Belgium
Preceded by Argentina	FIFA Team of the Year; 2017	Succeeded by Belgium
Preceded by Bayern Munich	Laureus Team of the Year; 2015	Succeeded by New Zealand
