= Han Duan =

Chinese footballer (born 1983)

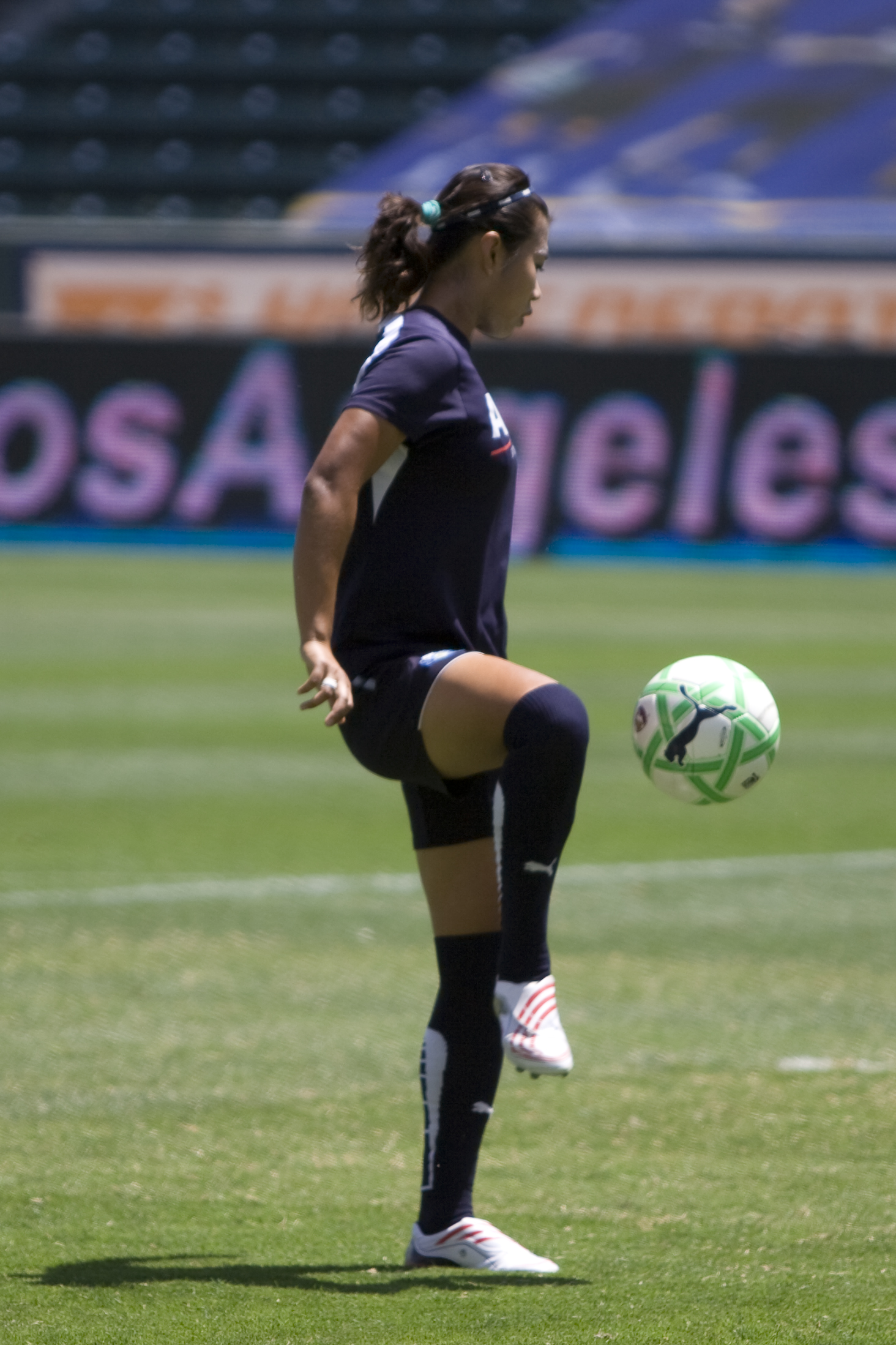

Personal information
- Full name: Han Duan
- Date of birth: 15 June 1983 (age 43)
- Place of birth: Dalian, China
- Height: 5 ft 7 in (1.70 m)
- Position: Forward

Senior career*
Years	Team	Apps	(Gls)
2009	Los Angeles Sol	16	(3)

International career^{‡}
2000–2011	China	188	(101)
Medal record
Women's football
Representing China
Asian Games
Bronze medal – third place	2006 Doha	Team
- * Club domestic league appearances and goals as of 18:29, 9 November 2009 (UTC) ‡ National team caps and goals as of 24 November 2011

Han Duan (simplified Chinese: 韩端; traditional Chinese: 韓端; pinyin: Hán Duān; born 15 June 1983) is a Chinese football forward who last played for Los Angeles Sol of Women's Professional Soccer and was a member of the Chinese National Team.

== Career ==
Duan finished ninth with the Chinese team in the 2004 Athens Olympics, playing in two matches during group stage. In 2008 Beijing Olympics, Duan scored a goal for China in a group stage match, resulting in a 2-1 win over Sweden. During the 2009 Women's Professional Soccer season, Duan scored a total of 3 goals and had 2 assists with the Los Angeles Sol.

Duan announced her retirement from international soccer, in September 2011, after China failed to qualify for 2012 London Olympics.

== Career statistics ==
=== Club career ===
Team	Season	League	Domestic League					Domestic Playoffs					Total				
Team	Season	League	Apps	Starts	Minutes	Goals	Assists	Apps	Starts	Minutes	Goals	Assists	Apps	Starts	Minutes	Goals	Assists
Los Angeles Sol	2009	WPS	16	13	1178	3	2	1	1	78	0	0	17	14	1256	3	2
		Total	16	13	1178	3	2	1	1	78	0	0	17	14	1256	3	2
Career Total		-	16	13	1178	3	2	1	1	78	0	0	17	14	1256	3	2

== International goals ==
No.	Date	Venue	Opponent	Score	Result	Competition
1.	11 January 2001	Guangzhou, China	United States	1–0	1–0	Friendly
2.	16 December 2001	New Taipei City, Taiwan	South Korea	7–0	8–0	2001 AFC Women's Championship
3.	16 December 2001	New Taipei City, Taiwan	South Korea	8–0	8–0	2001 AFC Women's Championship
4.	18 March 2003	Albufeira, Portugal	Denmark	1–0	2–1	2003 Algarve Cup
5.	9 June 2003	Nakhon Sawan, Thailand	Vietnam	6–0	6–0	2003 AFC Women's Championship
6.	13 June 2003	Nakhon Sawan, Thailand	Uzbekistan	2–0	11–0	2003 AFC Women's Championship
7.	13 June 2003	Nakhon Sawan, Thailand	Uzbekistan	5–0	11–0	2003 AFC Women's Championship
8.	4 September 2003	Dalian, China	South Africa	7–0	8–0	Friendly
9.	4 September 2003	Dalian, China	South Africa	8–0	8–0	Friendly
10.	7 September 2003	Dalian, China	South Africa	6–0	13–0	Friendly
11.	7 September 2003	Dalian, China	South Africa	9–0	13–0	Friendly
12.	7 September 2003	Dalian, China	South Africa	13–0	13–0	Friendly
13.	16 March 2004	Olhão, Portugal	Finland	?–0	4–0	2004 Algarve Cup
14.	16 March 2004	Olhão, Portugal	Finland	?–0	4–0	2004 Algarve Cup
15.	16 March 2004	Olhão, Portugal	Finland	?–0	4–0	2004 Algarve Cup
16.	18 April 2004	Hiroshima, Japan	Myanmar	5–0	11–0	2004 Summer Olympics qualification
17.	20 April 2004	Hiroshima, Japan	Guam	2–0	9–0	2004 Summer Olympics qualification
18.	20 April 2004	Hiroshima, Japan	Guam	9–0	9–0	2004 Summer Olympics qualification
19.	28 January 2005	Quanzhou, China	Russia	1–0	3–1	2005 Four Nations Tournament
20.	30 January 2005	Quanzhou, China	Australia	2–0	3–0	2005 Four Nations Tournament
21.	7 February 2005	Yiwu, China	Denmark	1–1	1–1	Friendly
22.	9 March 2005	Lagos, Portugal	Norway	1–1	1–2	2005 Algarve Cup
23.	19 July 2005	Tianjin, China	Australia	2–0	2–0	Friendly
24.	18 January 2006	Guangzhou, China	France	1–1	1–1	2006 Four Nations Tournament
25.	20 January 2006	Guangzhou, China	Norway	1–0	3–1	2006 Four Nations Tournament
26.	13 March 2006	Lagos, Portugal	Denmark	1–0	6–0	2006 Algarve Cup
27.	13 March 2006	Lagos, Portugal	Denmark	3–0	6–0	2006 Algarve Cup
28.	13 March 2006	Lagos, Portugal	Denmark	4–0	6–0	2006 Algarve Cup
29.	19 July 2006	Adelaide, Australia	Chinese Taipei	1–0	2–0	2006 AFC Women's Asian Cup
30.	30 July 2006	Adelaide, Australia	Australia	1–2	2–2 (a.e.t.) (4–2 p)	2006 AFC Women's Asian Cup
31.	27 August 2006	Brigdeview, United States	United States	1–0	1–4	Friendly
32.	10 November 2006	Hangzhou, China	Vietnam	1–0	4–1	Friendly
33.	16 November 2006	Hangzhou, China	New Zealand	1–0	4–0	Friendly
34.	16 November 2006	Hangzhou, China	New Zealand	2–0	4–0	Friendly
35.	16 November 2006	Hangzhou, China	New Zealand	3–0	4–0	Friendly
36.	16 November 2006	Hangzhou, China	New Zealand	4–0	4–0	Friendly
37.	30 November 2006	Doha, Qatar	Thailand	2–0	7–0	2006 Asian Games
38.	30 November 2006	Doha, Qatar	Thailand	3–0	7–0	2006 Asian Games
39.	30 November 2006	Doha, Qatar	Thailand	5–0	7–0	2006 Asian Games
40.	4 December 2006	Al-Rayyan, Qatar	Jordan	1–0	12–0	2006 Asian Games
41.	4 December 2006	Al-Rayyan, Qatar	Jordan	2–0	12–0	2006 Asian Games
42.	4 December 2006	Al-Rayyan, Qatar	Jordan	8–0	12–0	2006 Asian Games
43.	4 December 2006	Al-Rayyan, Qatar	Jordan	9–0	12–0	2006 Asian Games
44.	26 January 2007	Guangzhou, China	England	2–0	2–0	2007 Four Nations Tournament
45.	7 March 2007	Faro, Portugal	United States	1–1	1–2	2007 Algarve Cup
46.	3 May 2007	Nanjing, China	Canada	2–1	3–1	Friendly
47.	6 May 2007	Nanjing, China	Canada	1–0	2–1	Friendly
48.	30 May 2007	Xianghe, China	Australia	2–2	2–2	Friendly
49.	1 July 2007	Qinhuangdao, China	Thailand	2–0	4–0	Friendly
50.	4 July 2007	Shenyang, China	Mexico	1–0	1–0	Friendly
51.	7 July 2007	Qinhuangdao, China	Italy	1–0	3–1	Friendly
52.	7 July 2007	Qinhuangdao, China	Italy	2–0	3–1	Friendly
53.	16 August 2007	Tianjin, China	Australia	1–2	2–3	Friendly
54.	16 August 2007	Tianjin, China	Australia	2–2	2–3	Friendly
55.	23 August 2007	Shanghai, China	Vietnam	1–0	6–0	Friendly
56.	23 August 2007	Shanghai, China	Vietnam	3–0	6–0	Friendly
57.	23 August 2007	Shanghai, China	Vietnam	4–0	6–0	Friendly
58.	23 August 2007	Shanghai, China	Vietnam	5–0	6–0	Friendly
59.	19 December 2007	Guangzhou, China	New Zealand	2–0	4–0	Friendly
60.	18 February 2008	Chongqing, China	South Korea	1–0	3–2	2008 EAFF Women's Football Championship
61.	18 February 2008	Chongqing, China	South Korea	2–2	3–2	2008 EAFF Women's Football Championship
62.	5 June 2008	Ho Chi Minh City, Vietnam	Japan	3–1	3–1	2008 AFC Women's Asian Cup
63.	5 July 2008	Tianjin, China	Australia	1–0	5–0	Friendly
64.	6 August 2008	Tianjin, China	Sweden	2–1	2–1	2008 Summer Olympics
65.	10 January 2009	Guangzhou, China	New Zealand	5–0	6–0	2009 Four Nations Tournament
66.	10 January 2009	Guangzhou, China	New Zealand	6–0	6–0	2009 Four Nations Tournament
67.	9 December 2009	São Paulo, Brazil	Mexico	2–0	3–0	2009 Torneio Internacional
68.	27 December 2009	Nanjing, China	North Korea	1–1	1–1	Friendly
69.	13 January 2010	Alicante, Spain	Norway	1–0	1–0	Friendly
70.	15 January 2010	Alicante, Spain	England	1–2	2–2	Friendly
71.	15 January 2010	Alicante, Spain	England	2–2	2–2	Friendly
72.	13 February 2010	Tokyo, Japan	Chinese Taipei	1–0	3–0	2010 EAFF Women's Football Championship
73.	13 February 2010	Tokyo, Japan	Chinese Taipei	2–0	3–0	2010 EAFF Women's Football Championship
74.	24 February 2010	Lagos, Portugal	Finland	1–0	1–1	2010 Algarve Cup
75.	24 April 2010	Chongqing, China	Canada	1–0	2–0	Friendly
76.	21 May 2010	Chengdu, China	Vietnam	5–0	5–0	2010 AFC Women's Asian Cup

== See also ==
- List of women's footballers with 100 or more international caps
- List of association women football players with 100 or more international goals
