= Kerstin Garefrekes =

German footballer (born 1979)

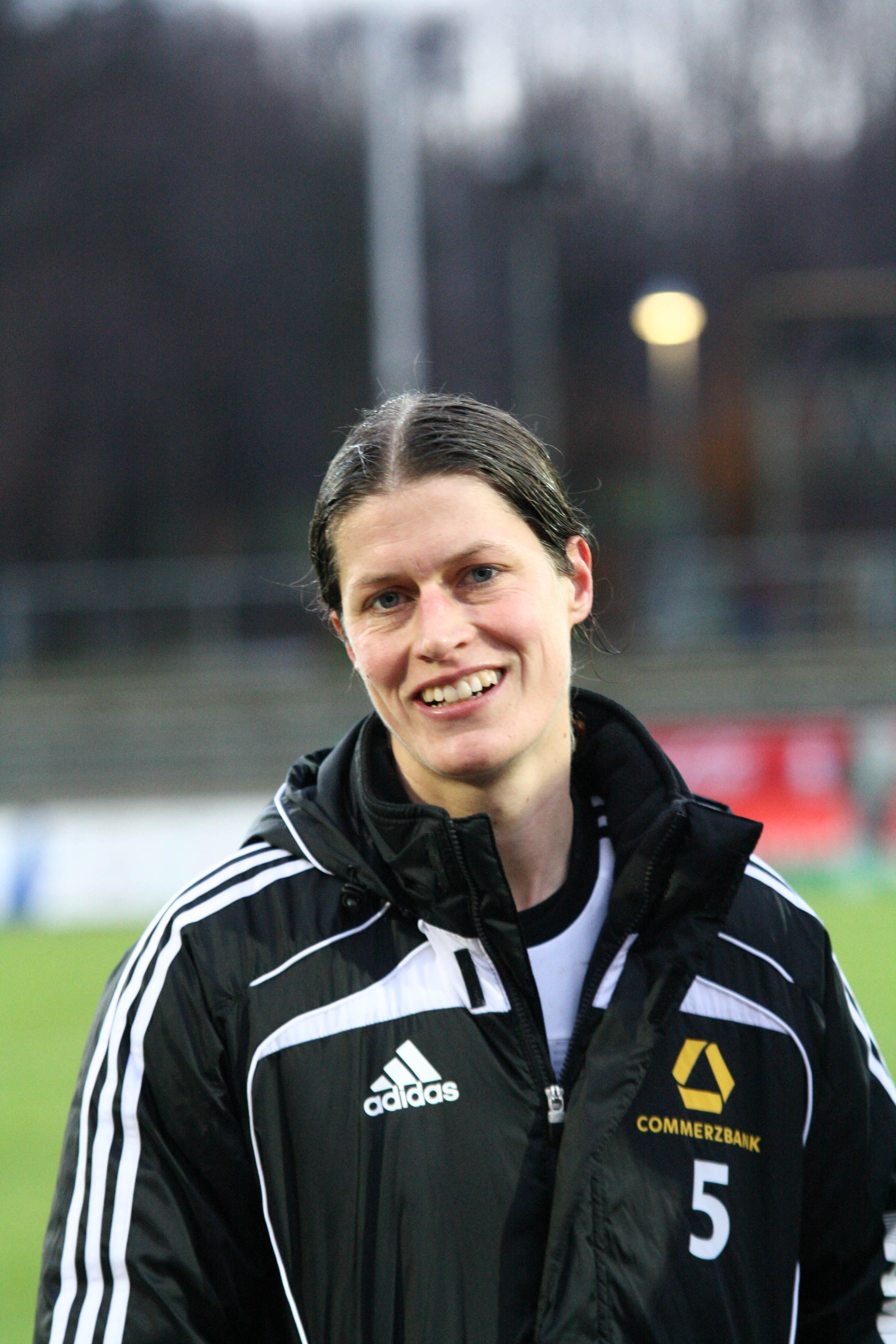
- Garefrekes with 1. FFC Frankfurt in 2011

Personal information
- Full name: Kerstin Garefrekes
- Date of birth: 4 September 1979 (age 47)
- Place of birth: Ibbenbüren, West Germany
- Height: 1.79 m (5 ft 10 in)
- Positions: Forward; midfielder

Youth career
- Grün-Weiß Steinbeck
- DJK Arminia Ibbenbüren

Senior career*
Years	Team	Apps	(Gls)
1998–2004	FFC Heike Rheine	102	(63)
2004–2016	1. FFC Frankfurt	253	(184)
2014	Washington Spirit	10	(1)
Total		365	(248)

International career
2001–2011	Germany	130	(43)
Medal record
Women's football
Representing Germany
FIFA Women's World Cup
Gold medal – first place	2003 United States	Team
Gold medal – first place	2007 China	Team
Olympic Games
Bronze medal – third place	2004 Athens	Team
Bronze medal – third place	2008 Beijing	Team
UEFA Women's Championship
Gold medal – first place	2005 England	Team
Gold medal – first place	2009 Finland	Team
- * Club domestic league appearances and goals

Kerstin Garefrekes (born 4 September 1979) is a German former footballer who played as a striker or midfielder.

== Club career ==
Garefrekes began her career in 1986 at her local football club Grün-Weiß Steinbeck, before joining DJK Arminia Ibbenbüren. In 1998, she moved to the newly founded Bundesliga side FFC Heike Rheine. Garefrekes was relegated to the second division with Heike Rheine in 1999, but achieved immediate promotion back to the Bundesliga the following season. With 26 goals, she won the 2003–04 Bundesliga top scorer award.

In 2004, Garefrekes transferred to 1. FFC Frankfurt, where she claimed several major titles. She won the Bundesliga trophy and the German Cup title three times each. During the 2005–06 and 2007–08 seasons, Garefrekes also won the UEFA Women's Cup at Frankfurt.

Following the departure of Nadine Angerer from Frankfurt, Garefrekes became the new captain of her squad.

== International career ==
Garefrekes made her debut for the Germany national team in November 2001 in against the Netherlands. Two years later, she won her first major international title at the 2003 FIFA Women's World Cup. She was an important player for the team, starting in five of the team's six matches and scoring four goals. Garefrekes scored Germany's first and ultimately decisive goal in the semi-final win over the United States. She went on to win the bronze medal at the 2004 Summer Olympics and the title at the 2005 European Championship. In qualifying for the UEFA Women's Euro 2009, she scored a number of goals, including a hat-trick in Germany's 7–0 defeat of Switzerland.

During Germany's successful title defence at the 2007 FIFA Women's World Cup, Garefrekes was part of the team's starting line-up in all of the six matches. She scored twice, including the opener in the quarter-final victory against North Korea. Garefrekes again claimed bronze at the 2008 Summer Olympics and won the European Championship for a second time in 2009. She has been called up for Germany's 2011 FIFA Women's World Cup squad. A few months before the start of the World Cup, she scored a hat trick in a friendly match against Nigeria. Following the tournament she retired from international play.

== Career statistics ==
No.	Date	Venue	Opponent	Score	Result	Competition
1.	27 January 2002	Guangzhou, China	Norway	1–1	3–1	2002 Four Nations Tournament
2.	7 March 2002	Faro, Portugal	Sweden	1–2	1–2	2002 Algarve Cup
3.	25 May 2003	Haderslev, Denmark	Denmark	1–0	6–2	Friendly
4.	9 August 2003	Kyiv, Ukraine	Ukraine	1–1	3–1	UEFA Women's Euro 2005 qualifying
5.	20 September 2003	Columbus, United States	Canada	4–1	4–1	2003 FIFA Women's World Cup
6.	2 October 2003	Portland, United States	Russia	4–0	7–1	2003 FIFA Women's World Cup
7.	2 October 2003	Portland, United States	Russia	6–1	7–1	2003 FIFA Women's World Cup
8.	5 October 2003	Portland, United States	United States	1–0	3–0	2003 FIFA Women's World Cup
9.	15 November 2003	Reutlingen, Germany	Portugal	3–0	13–0	UEFA Women's Euro 2005 qualifying
10.	2 May 2004	Livingston, Scotland	Scotland	1–0	3–1	UEFA Women's Euro 2005 qualifying
11.	25 September 2004	Příbram, Czech Republic	Czech Republic	1–0	5–0	UEFA Women's Euro 2005 qualifying
12.	24 April 2005	Hildesheim, Germany	Canada	3–1	3–1	Friendly
13.	1 September 2005	Burnaby, Canada	Canada	1–0	3–1	Friendly
14.	9 March 2006	Algarve, Portugal	Finland	3–0	5–0	2006 Algarve Cup
15.	3 August 2006	Krefeld, Germany	Italy	3–0	5–0	Friendly
16.	26 August 2006	Dublin, Ireland	Republic of Ireland	3–0	3–0	2007 FIFA Women's World Cup qualification
17.	30 August 2006	Schaffhausen, Switzerland	Switzerland	6–0	6–0	2007 FIFA Women's World Cup qualification
18.	23 September 2006	Perth, Scotland	Scotland	3–0	5–0	2007 FIFA Women's World Cup qualification
19.	27 September 2006	Moscow, Russia	Russia	2–0	3–2	2007 FIFA Women's World Cup qualification
20.	23 November 2006	Karlsruhe, Germany	Japan	4–1	6–3	Friendly
21.	12 April 2007	Bochum, Germany	Netherlands	5–1	5–1	UEFA Women's Euro 2009 qualifying
22.	10 May 2007	Haverfordwest, Wales	Wales	4–0	6–0	UEFA Women's Euro 2009 qualifying
23.	2 August 2007	Gera, Germany	Czech Republic	3–0	5–0	Friendly
24.	22 August 2007	Koblenz, Germany	Switzerland	5–0	7–0	UEFA Women's Euro 2009 qualifying
25.	22 August 2007	Koblenz, Germany	Switzerland	6–0	7–0	UEFA Women's Euro 2009 qualifying
26.	22 August 2007	Koblenz, Germany	Switzerland	7–0	7–0	UEFA Women's Euro 2009 qualifying
27.	10 September 2007	Shanghai, China	Argentina	2–0	11–0	2007 FIFA Women's World Cup
28.	22 September 2007	Wuhan, China	North Korea	1–0	3–0	2007 FIFA Women's World Cup
29.	28 October 2007	Lübeck, Germany	Belgium	1–0	3–0	UEFA Women's Euro 2009 qualifying
30.	7 May 2008	Eupen, Belgium	Belgium	2–0	5–0	UEFA Women's Euro 2009 qualifying
31.	7 May 2008	Eupen, Belgium	Belgium	4–0	5–0	UEFA Women's Euro 2009 qualifying
32.	15 August 2008	Shenyang, China	Sweden	1–0	2–0 (a.e.t.)	2008 Summer Olympics
33.	1 October 2008	Basel, Switzerland	Switzerland	1–0	3–0	UEFA Women's Euro 2009 qualifying
34.	4 March 2009	Albufeira, Portugal	Finland	2–0	2–0	2009 Algarve Cup
35.	6 March 2009	Albufeira, Portugal	China	1–0	3–0	2009 Algarve Cup
36.	6 March 2009	Albufeira, Portugal	China	3–0	3–0	2009 Algarve Cup
37.	6 August 2009	Bochum, Germany	Russia	1–0	3–1	Friendly
38.	1 March 2010	Faro, Portugal	China	1–0	5–0	2010 Algarve Cup
39.	25 November 2010	Leverkusen, Germany	Nigeria	2–0	8–0	Friendly
40.	25 November 2010	Leverkusen, Germany	Nigeria	7–0	8–0	Friendly
41.	25 November 2010	Leverkusen, Germany	Nigeria	8–0	8–0	Friendly
42.	26 June 2011	Berlin, Germany	Canada	1–0	2–1	2011 FIFA Women's World Cup
43.	5 July 2011	Mönchengladbach, Germany	France	1–0	4–2	2011 FIFA Women's World Cup

== Honours ==
1. FFC Frankfurt

- UEFA Women's Champions League: 2005–06, 2007–08, 2014–15
- Bundesliga: 2004–05, 2006–07, 2007–08
- Frauen DFB-Pokal: 2006–07, 2007–08, 2010–11, 2010–14

Germany

- FIFA World Cup: 2003, 2007
- UEFA European Championship: 2005, 2009
- Olympic bronze medal: 2004, 2008
- Algarve Cup: 2006

Individual

- Bundesliga top scorer: 2003–04
- Silbernes Lorbeerblatt: 2007
- FIFA Women's World Cup All Star Team: 2011
