= Xu Yuan (footballer) =

Chinese footballer

Xu Yuan (Chinese: 徐媛; pinyin: Xú Yuán; born November 17, 1985, in Chongqing, Sichuan) is a Chinese football (soccer) striker who competed in the 2008 Summer Olympics. Xu plays in the forward position.

Xu was called up to the Chinese Youth Team in 2004, and won a silver medal at the 2004 Asian Youth Football Games. She also participated for the U-19 team, and helped them reach the final of 2004 FIFA U-19 Women's World Championship in November 2007, and her first major tournament was the Olympic Games in Beijing. Xu scored the first goal for the team in the opening match, which saw China post a 2–1 win over Sweden.

== International goals ==
No.	Date	Venue	Opponent	Score	Result	Competition
1.	18 February 2008	Chongqing, China	South Korea	3–2	3–2	2008 EAFF Women's Football Championship
2.	28 May 2008	Hồ Chí Minh City, Vietnam	Vietnam	1–0	1–0	2008 AFC Women's Asian Cup
3.	30 May 2008	Hồ Chí Minh City, Vietnam	Thailand	3–0	5–1	2008 AFC Women's Asian Cup
4.	6 August 2008	Tianjin, China	Sweden	1–0	2–1	2008 Summer Olympics
5.	9 August 2008	Tianjin, China	Canada	1–1	1–1	2008 Summer Olympics
6.	10 January 2009	Guangzhou, China	New Zealand	3–0	6–0	2009 Four Nations Tournament
7.	10 January 2009	Guangzhou, China	New Zealand	4–0	6–0	2009 Four Nations Tournament
8.	25 February 2009	Bielefeld, Germany	Germany	1–1	1–1	Friendly
9.	11 March 2009	Olhão, Portugal	Iceland	2–1	2–1	2009 Algarve Cup
10.	9 July 2009	Krasnoarmeysk, Russia	Russia	1–0	1–0	Friendly
11.	11 July 2009	Amsterdam, Netherlands	South Africa	2–0	5–0	Friendly
12.	14 November 2010	Guangzhou, China	Jordan	3–0	10–1	2010 Asian Games
13.	14 November 2010	Guangzhou, China	Jordan	9–1	10–1	2010 Asian Games
14.	5 September 2011	Jinan, China	Thailand	2–0	2–0	2012 Summer Olympics qualification
