= Emelie Ölander =

Swedish footballer

Emelie Ölander (born 23 June 1989) is a Swedish international football player. She has been part of the Swedish national team since 2009.

== Career ==
At the age of five, Emelie Ölander started to play football in the youth team of Malmö FF. Some years later she became a national youth player for Sweden.

Her first season in the Swedish women's league Damallsvenskan, she played for Malmö FF, but left the team after only one year. She moved to AIK where she played a season as defender and was invited to the Swedish national team. She played on the team that won the Algarve Cup in 2009.
