= 2009 Algarve Cup =

International women's football tournament

Tournament details
- Host country: Portugal
- Dates: 4–11 March 2009
- Teams: 12 (from 3 confederations)
- Venues: 9 (in 9 host cities)

Final positions
- Champions: Sweden (3rd title)
- Runners-up: United States
- Third place: Denmark

Tournament statistics
- Matches played: 24
- Goals scored: 55 (2.29 per match)
- Top scorer(s): (Germany) Kerstin Garefrekes (Wales) Jayne Ludlow (Sweden) Lotta Schelin (3 goals)
- Best player: (United States) Hope Solo

The 2009 Algarve Cup was the sixteenth edition of the Algarve Cup, an invitational women's football tournament held annually in Portugal. It took place between 4 and 11 March 2009. It was won by Sweden who defeated holders the United States in a penalty shootout after a 1–1 draw in the final-game.

== Format ==
The twelve invited teams were split into three groups that played a round-robin tournament. The entrants were almost identical to the previous year, but Iceland moved up into Group B from their previous ranking in 2008, replacing Italy who did not feature this time. Wales returned to the competition for the first time in five years, while Austria appeared in the competition for the first time.

Groups A and B, containing the strongest ranked teams, were the only ones in contention to win the title. The group winners from A and B contested the final, with the runners-up playing for third place and those that finished third in these two groups playing for fifth place.

The teams in Group C were playing for places 7-12, with the winner of Group C playing the team that finished fourth in Group A or B with the better record for seventh place and the Group C runner-up playing the team which came last in Group A or B with the worse record for ninth place. The third and fourth-placed teams in Group C played for eleventh place.

Points awarded in the group stage follow the standard formula of three points for a win, one point for a draw and zero points for a loss. In the case of two teams being tied on the same number of points in a group, their head-to-head result determined the higher place.

== Teams ==
The twelve invited teams were:

| Team | FIFA Rankings (December 2008) |
|---|---|
| United States | 1 |
| Germany | 2 |
| Sweden | 4 |
| Norway | 6 |
| Denmark | 7 |
| China | 13 |
| Finland | 17 |
| Iceland | 19 |
| Poland | 31 |
| Austria | 37 |
| Portugal (hosts) | 45 |
| Wales | 49 |

== Group stage ==
All times local (WET/UTC+0)

=== Group A ===
| Team | Pts | Pld | W | D | L | GF | GA | GD |
|---|---|---|---|---|---|---|---|---|
| Sweden | 7 | 3 | 2 | 1 | 0 | 4 | 2 | +2 |
| Germany | 6 | 3 | 2 | 0 | 1 | 7 | 3 | +4 |
| China | 4 | 3 | 1 | 1 | 1 | 1 | 3 | −2 |
| Finland | 0 | 3 | 0 | 0 | 3 | 0 | 4 | −4 |

4 March 2009
13:15

| Germany | 2 – 0 | Finland |
|---|---|---|
| Behringer 70'; Garefrekes 90' |

Municipal Stadium, Albufeira

4 March 2009
15:00

| China | 0 – 0 | Sweden |
|---|---|---|
| | SvFF Report (in Swedish) |

Municipal Stadium, Lagos

6 March 2009
12:00

| Sweden | 1 – 0 | Finland |
|---|---|---|
| Fischer 75' | SvFF Report (in Swedish) |

Municipal Stadium, Lagos

6 March 2009
13:15

| Germany | 3 – 0 | China |
|---|---|---|
| Garefrekes 38', 68'; Kulig 58' |

Municipal Stadium, Albufeira

9 March 2009
13:15

| Finland | 0 – 1 | China |
|---|---|---|
| | | Bi Yan 73' |

Municipal Stadium, Vila Real de Santo António

9 March 2009
13:15

| Sweden | 3 – 2 | Germany |
|---|---|---|
| Fischer 28'; Schelin 36' 38' | SvFF Report (in Swedish) | Grings 77'; Kulig 83' |

Estádio Algarve, Faro

=== Group B ===
| Team | Pts | Pld | W | D | L | GF | GA | GD |
|---|---|---|---|---|---|---|---|---|
| United States | 9 | 3 | 3 | 0 | 0 | 4 | 0 | +4 |
| Denmark | 6 | 3 | 2 | 0 | 1 | 4 | 2 | +2 |
| Iceland | 3 | 3 | 1 | 0 | 2 | 2 | 3 | −1 |
| Norway | 0 | 3 | 0 | 0 | 3 | 1 | 6 | −5 |

4 March 2009
12:00

| United States | 2 – 0 | Denmark |
|---|---|---|
| Woznuk 22'; DiMartino 37' | Report |

Municipal Stadium, Lagos

4 March 2009
15:00

| Norway | 1 – 3 | Iceland |
|---|---|---|
| Lie 41' | | Gunnarsdóttir 18', 51'; Rønning 56' (o.g.) |

José Arcanjo Stadium, Olhão

6 March 2009
15:00

| United States | 1 – 0 | Iceland |
|---|---|---|
| Kai 90' | Report |

Estádio da Nora, Ferreiras

6 March 2009
15:00

| Denmark | 2 – 0 | Norway |
|---|---|---|
| Rasmussen 10'; Pedersen 86' |

Municipal Stadium, Lagos

9 March 2009
15:00

| Norway | 0 – 1 | United States |
|---|---|---|
| | Report | Rapinoe 21' |

Estádio da Nora, Ferreiras

9 March 2009
15:00

| Iceland | 0 – 2 | Denmark |
|---|---|---|
| | | Nadim 36'; Ørntoft 67' |

Francisco Vieira Stadium, Silves

=== Group C ===
| Team | Pts | Pld | W | D | L | GF | GA | GD |
|---|---|---|---|---|---|---|---|---|
| Portugal | 9 | 3 | 3 | 0 | 0 | 5 | 2 | +3 |
| Austria | 4 | 3 | 1 | 1 | 1 | 3 | 3 | 0 |
| Wales | 3 | 3 | 1 | 0 | 2 | 7 | 5 | +2 |
| Poland | 1 | 3 | 0 | 1 | 2 | 3 | 8 | −5 |

4 March 2009
15:00

| Wales | 1 – 2 | Austria |
|---|---|---|
| Fishlock 35' | | Entner 47'; Walzl 85' |

Restinga Stadium, Alvor

4 March 2009
17:45

| Portugal | 2 – 1 | Poland |
|---|---|---|
| Borges 36'; Fernandes 44' | | Rytwińska 30' |

Municipal Stadium, Albufeira

6 March 2009
15:00

| Austria | 1 – 1 | Poland |
|---|---|---|
| Gröbner 61' | | Sznyrowska 70' |

Municipal Stadium, Vila Real de Santo António

6 March 2009
17:45

| Portugal | 2 – 1 | Wales |
|---|---|---|
| Fernandes 27'; Cristina 57' (pen.) | | Ludlow 70' |

Municipal Stadium, Albufeira

9 March 2009
17:45

| Portugal | 1 – 0 | Austria |
|---|---|---|
| Vieira 8' |

Estádio Algarve, Faro

9 March 2009
17:45

| Poland | 1 – 5 | Wales |
|---|---|---|
| Kawalec 80' | | Ludlow 22' 32'; Harries 38' 42'; Lander 86' |

Municipal Stadium, Loulé

== Placement play-offs ==
All times local (WET/UTC+0)

=== 11th place ===
11 March 2009
11:30

| Wales | 1 – 2 | Poland |
|---|---|---|
| Fishlock 14' | | Sznyrowska 10'; Pożerska 88' |

CD Montechoro, Albufeira

=== 9th place ===
11 March 2009
11:30

| Austria | 0 – 2 | Norway |
|---|---|---|
| | | Rønning 43'; Gulbrandsen 78' |

Municipal Stadium, Loulé

=== 7th place ===
11 March 2009
11:30

| Portugal | 1 – 1 (2 – 4 PSO) | Finland |
|---|---|---|
| Couto 70' | | Lehtinen 13' |

Municipal Stadium, Lagos

=== 5th place ===
11 March 2009
11:30

| China | 2 – 1 | Iceland |
|---|---|---|
| Lou Jiahui 21'; Xu Yuan 69' | Report | Þorsteinsdóttir 45' |

José Arcanjo Stadium, Olhão

=== 3rd place ===
11 March 2009
13:15

| Germany | 0 – 1 | Denmark |
|---|---|---|
| | | Rydahl Bukh 41' |

Estádio Algarve, Faro

== Final ==
11 March 2009
16:00

| United States | 1 – 1 (3 – 4 PSO) | Sweden |
|---|---|---|
| Boxx 90' | Report; SvFF Report (in Swedish) | Schelin 18' |
Penalties
| Boxx (penalty scored); Rapinoe (penalty missed); Lloyd (penalty scored); Rampone (penalty missed); DiMartino (penalty scored); Woznuk (penalty missed); Mitts (penalty missed) | 3 – 4 | (penalty scored) Fors; (penalty scored) Dahlkvist; (penalty scored) Sembrant; (penalty missed) Paulson; (penalty missed) Schelin; (penalty missed) Olander; (penalty scored) Segerström |

Estádio Algarve, Faro
Attendance: 1,200
Referee: Bibiana Steinhaus (Germany)

UNITED STATES:
| GK | 1 | Hope Solo |
| DF | 7 | Shannon Boxx |
| DF | 17 | Heather Mitts (c) |
| DF | 15 | Lori Chalupny |
| DF | 3 | Christie Rampone |
| MF | 9 | Heather O'Reilly | (substituted off) 88' |
| MF | 16 | Angela Hucles | (substituted off) 83' |
| MF | 11 | Carli Lloyd |
| MF | 5 | Lindsay Tarpley | (substituted off) 46' |
| FW | 15 | Megan Rapinoe |
| FW | 6 | Natasha Kai |
Substitutes:
| GK | 18 | Nicole Barnhart |
| DF | 4 | Rachel Buehler |
| DF | 13 | Kendall Fletcher |
| MF | 21 | Kacey White |
| MF | 12 | Angie Woznuk | (substituted on) 88' |
| FW | 19 | Tina DiMartino | (substituted on) 83' |
| FW | 8 | Amy Rodriguez | (substituted on) 46' |
Manager:
(Sweden) Pia Sundhage

SWEDEN:
| GK | 12 | Kristin Hammarström |
| DF | 2 | Charlotte Rohlin |
| DF | 3 | Stina Segerström |
| DF | 4 | Anna Paulson |
| DF | 6 | Sara Thunebro | (substituted off) 46' |
| MF | 5 | Caroline Seger | (substituted off) 78' |
| MF | 15 | Therese Sjögran | (substituted off) 63' |
| MF | 17 | Kosovare Asllani | (substituted off) 53' |
| MF | 18 | Nilla Fischer | (substituted off) 37' |
| FW | 11 | Victoria Svensson (c) | (substituted off) 71' |
| FW | 8 | Lotta Schelin |
Substitutes:
| GK | 1 | Hedvig Lindahl |
| DF | 7 | Emelie Ölander | (substituted on) 46' |
| DF | 13 | Alexandra Nilsson |
| DF | 19 | Linda Sembrant | (substituted on) 78' |
| MF | 16 | Louise Fors | (substituted on) 63' |
| MF | 20 | Lisa Dahlkvist | (substituted on) 37' |
| FW | 9 | Anna Lindblom |
| FW | 10 | Sara Lindén | (substituted on) 71' |
| FW | 14 | Madelaine Edlund | (substituted on) 53' |
Manager:
(Sweden) Thomas Dennerby

Match rules

- 90 minutes
- No extra time
- Penalty shoot-out if scores still level

2009 Algarve Cup

Sweden
Third title
