= Bi Yan =

Chinese footballer (born 1984)

Personal information
- Full name: Bi Yan
- Date of birth: 17 February 1984 (age 42)
- Place of birth: Dalian, Liaoning, China
- Height: 1.68 m (5 ft 6 in)
- Position: Midfielder

International career
Years	Team	Apps	(Gls)
2003–2010	China	158	(5)
Medal record
Women's football
Representing China
Asian Games
Silver medal – second place	2002 Busan	Team
Bronze medal – third place	2006 Doha	Team

Bi Yan (simplified Chinese: 毕妍; traditional Chinese: 畢妍; pinyin: Bì Yán; born 17 February 1984) is a Chinese footballer who played as a midfielder and competed at the 2004 Summer Olympics.

In 2004, she finished ninth with the Chinese team in the women's tournament. She played both matches.

== International goals ==
No.	Date	Venue	Opponent	Score	Result	Competition
1.	28 January 2005	Quanzhou, China	Russia	3–1	3–1	2005 Four Nations Tournament
2.	20 January 2006	Guangzhou, China	Norway	2–1	3–1	2006 Four Nations Tournament
3.	12 September 2007	Wuhan, China	Denmark	2–0	3–2	2007 FIFA Women's World Cup
4.	8 June 2008	Ho Chi Minh City, Vietnam	North Korea	1–0	1–2	2008 AFC Women's Asian Cup
5.	21 May 2010	Chengdu, China	Vietnam	4–0	5–0	2010 AFC Women's Asian Cup

== See also ==
- List of women's footballers with 100 or more international caps
