= 2006 Four Nations Tournament (women's football) =

Tournament details
- Host country: China
- City: Guangzhou
- Dates: 18–22 January 2006
- Teams: 4 (from 3 confederations)
- Venue(s): Guangdong Olympic Stadium

The 2006 Four Nations Tournament was the sixth edition of the Four Nations Tournament, an invitational women's football tournament held in China. The venue for this edition of the tournament was Guangdong Olympic Stadium, in the city of Guangzhou.

== Participants ==
Team	FIFA Rankings (December 2005)
United States	2
Norway	3
France	7
China (host)	9

== Venues ==
Guangzhou	Guangdong Olympic Stadium is located in China
Guangdong Olympic Stadium	Guangdong Olympic Stadium is located in China
23.137656°N 113.403519°E	Guangdong Olympic Stadium is located in China
Capacity: 80,012	Guangdong Olympic Stadium is located in China

== Final standings ==
Team	Pld	W	D	L	GF	GA	GD	Pts
United States	3	2	1	0	5	1	+4	7
China	3	1	1	1	4	4	0	4
France	3	0	3	0	2	2	0	3
Norway	3	0	1	2	3	7	−4	1

== Match results ==
18 January 2006

Norway	1–3	United States
Rønning 81' (pen.)		Lilly 72'; Boxx 77'; Wambach 85'

Guangdong Olympic Stadium, Guangzhou
Attendance: 2,000
Referee: Zhang Dong Qing (China)
18 January 2006

China	1–1	France
Han Duan 90'		Bussaglia 72'

Guangdong Olympic Stadium, Guangzhou

20 January 2006

United States	0–0	France

Guangdong Olympic Stadium, Guangzhou
Attendance: 2,500
Referee: Deng Jun Xia (China)
20 January 2006

China	3–1	Norway
Han Duan 45'; Bi Yan 63'; Ma Xiaoxu 63'		Knutsen 60'

Guangdong Olympic Stadium, Guangzhou

22 January 2006

France	1–1	Norway
Tonazzi 19'		Kaufmann 88'

Guangdong Olympic Stadium, Guangzhou
22 January 2006

China	0–2	United States
		Lilly 24' (pen.), 41'

Guangdong Olympic Stadium, Guangzhou
Attendance: 15,000
Referee: Ann Helen Ostervold (Norway)
