= 2007 Algarve Cup =

International women's football tournament

Tournament details
- Host country: Portugal
- Dates: 7–14 March 2007
- Teams: 12 (from 3 confederations)

Final positions
- Champions: United States (5th title)
- Runners-up: Denmark
- Third place: Sweden

Tournament statistics
- Matches played: 24
- Goals scored: 61 (2.54 per match)
- Top scorer: (United States) Carli Lloyd (4 goals)
- Best player: (United States) Carli Lloyd
- Best goalkeeper: (Sweden) Caroline Jonsson

The 2007 Algarve Cup was the fourteenth edition of the Algarve Cup, an invitational women's football tournament held annually in Portugal. It took place between 7 and 12 March 2007 with the previous year's runners-up, the United States, winning the event for a record fifth time, breaking Norway's previous record of four championships, by defeating Denmark, 2-0, in the final game. Sweden ended up third defeating France, 3-1, in the bronze medal game.

== Format ==
The twelve invited teams were split into three groups that played a round-robin tournament. All of the teams from Groups A and B returned from 2006, but Italy and Iceland were invited back for the third time to play in Group C replacing Mexico and Wales.

Groups A and B, containing the strongest ranked teams, were the only ones in contention to win the title. The group winners from A and B contested the final, with the runners-up playing for third place and those that finished third in these two groups playing for fifth place.

The teams in Group C were playing for places 7-12, with the winner of Group C playing the team that finished fourth in Group A or B with the better record for seventh place and the Group C runner-up playing the team which came last in Group A or B with the worse record for ninth place. The third and fourth-placed teams in Group C played for eleventh place.

Points awarded in the group stage follow the standard formula of three points for a win, one point for a draw, and zero points for a loss. In the case of two teams being tied on the same number of points in a group, their head-to-head result determined the higher placed.

== Teams ==
The twelve invited teams were:

| Team | FIFA Rankings (December 2006) |
|---|---|
| Germany | 1 |
| United States | 2 |
| Norway | 3 |
| Sweden | 4 |
| France | 7 |
| Denmark | 8 |
| China | 9 |
| Italy | 13 |
| Finland | 16 |
| Iceland | 21 |
| Republic of Ireland | 32 |
| Portugal (hosts) | 46 |

== Group stage ==
All times local (WET/UTC+0)

=== Group A ===
| Team | Pts | Pld | W | D | L | GF | GA | GD |
|---|---|---|---|---|---|---|---|---|
| Denmark | 6 | 3 | 2 | 0 | 1 | 5 | 3 | +2 |
| France | 6 | 3 | 2 | 0 | 1 | 2 | 4 | −2 |
| Norway | 3 | 3 | 1 | 0 | 2 | 2 | 3 | −1 |
| Germany | 3 | 3 | 1 | 0 | 2 | 4 | 3 | +1 |

7 March 2007

| France | 0–4 | Denmark |
|---|---|---|
| | | Paaske-Sørensen 30'; Pape 68'; Rasmussen 73'; Pedersen 89' |

Estádio Municipal, Silves
7 March 2007

| Germany | 1–2 | Norway |
|---|---|---|
| Lingor 18' | | Stensland 15'; Wiik 69' |

Estádio Algarve, Faro

9 March 2007

| France | 1–0 | Germany |
|---|---|---|
| Bussaglia 33' |

Estádio Algarve, Faro
9 March 2007

| Norway | 0–1 | Denmark |
|---|---|---|
| | | Larsen 89' |

Estádio da Nora, Ferreiras

12 March 2007

| France | 1–0 | Norway |
|---|---|---|
| Abily 67' |

Estádio Municipal, Lagos
12 March 2007

| Germany | 3–0 | Denmark |
|---|---|---|
| Mittag 16', 44'; Behringer 48' |

Estádio Municipal, Vila Real de Santo António

=== Group B ===
| Team | Pts | Pld | W | D | L | GF | GA | GD |
|---|---|---|---|---|---|---|---|---|
| United States | 9 | 3 | 3 | 0 | 0 | 6 | 3 | +3 |
| Sweden | 6 | 3 | 2 | 0 | 1 | 6 | 3 | +3 |
| Finland | 3 | 3 | 1 | 0 | 2 | 2 | 4 | −2 |
| China | 0 | 3 | 0 | 0 | 3 | 1 | 5 | −4 |

7 March 2007

| Sweden | 3–0 | Finland |
|---|---|---|
| Sjögran 22'; Svensson 34'; Nordin 90+1' | SvFF Report (in Swedish) |

Estádio Algarve, Faro
7 March 2007

| United States | 2–1 | China |
|---|---|---|
| Lilly 19' (pen.); Lloyd 38' | Report | Duan 21' |

Estádio Algarve, Faro

9 March 2007

| Sweden | 1–0 | China |
|---|---|---|
| Rohlin 90' | SvFF Report (in Swedish) |

Estádio Algarve, Faro
9 March 2007

| United States | 1–0 | Finland |
|---|---|---|
| Lloyd 46' | Report |

Estádio Municipal, Vila Real de Santo António

12 March 2007

| Sweden | 2–3 | United States |
|---|---|---|
| Oqvist 71'; Svensson 83' (pen.) | Report; SvFF Report (in Swedish) | Wambach 39', 72'; Lloyd 44' |

Estádio Municipal, Vila Real de Santo António
12 March 2007

| China | 0–2 | Finland |
|---|---|---|
| | | Rantanen 23' (pen.); Talonen 31' |

Estádio do Portimonense, Portimão

=== Group C ===
| Team | Pts | Pld | W | D | L | GF | GA | GD |
|---|---|---|---|---|---|---|---|---|
| Italy | 9 | 3 | 3 | 0 | 0 | 7 | 2 | +5 |
| Iceland | 4 | 3 | 1 | 1 | 1 | 7 | 4 | +3 |
| Republic of Ireland | 2 | 3 | 0 | 2 | 1 | 3 | 6 | −3 |
| Portugal | 1 | 3 | 0 | 1 | 2 | 2 | 7 | −5 |

7 March 2007

| Portugal | 1–1 | Republic of Ireland |
|---|---|---|
| Martins 59' | Report | Curtis 7' |

Estádio Municipal, Lagos
7 March 2007

| Italy | 2–1 | Iceland |
|---|---|---|
| Conti 21'; Panico 46' | | Viðarsdóttir 45' (pen.) |

Estádio Municipal, Lagos

9 March 2007

| Portugal | 0–1 | Italy |
|---|---|---|
| | Report | Conti 9' |

Estádio Municipal, Lagos
9 March 2007

| Iceland | 1–1 | Republic of Ireland |
|---|---|---|
| Logadóttir 36' | | O'Toole 72' |

Estádio Municipal, Lagos

12 March 2007

| Portugal | 1–5 | Iceland |
|---|---|---|
| Dani 35' | Report | Jónsdóttir 6'; Magnúsdóttir 58', 78', 90'; Viðarsdóttir 90+3' |

Estádio Municipal, Lagos
12 March 2007

| Italy | 4–1 | Republic of Ireland |
|---|---|---|
| Panico 17'; Fuselli 58', 61'; Gama 64' | | Byrne 35' |

Estádio Dr. Francisco Vieira, Silves

== Placement play-offs ==
All times local (WET/UTC+0)

=== 11th place ===
14 March 2007
10:00

| Republic of Ireland | 0–0 (5–4 PSO) | Portugal |
|---|---|---|
| | Report |

Estádio da Nora, Ferreiras

=== 9th place ===
14 March 2007
10:00

| Iceland | 4–1 | China |
|---|---|---|
| Lárusdóttir 68'; Samúelsdóttir 75'; Viðarsdóttir 81', 82' | | Lou Xiaoxu 90+2' |

Complexo Desportivo, Montechoro

=== 7th place ===
14 March 2007

| Italy | 1–0 | Germany |
|---|---|---|
| Fuselli 81' |

Estádio José Arcanjo, Olhão

=== 5th place ===
14 March 2007

| Norway | 2–0 | Finland |
|---|---|---|
| Wiik 55'; Storløkken 90' |

Estádio Josino Costa, Lagoa

=== 3rd place ===
14 March 2007

| Sweden | 3–1 | France |
|---|---|---|
| Öqvist 17'; Svensson 45+1'; Johansson 47' | SvFF Report (in Swedish) | Ramos 68' |

Estádio Municipal, Vila Real de Santo António

== Final ==
14 March 2007

| United States | 2–0 | Denmark |
|---|---|---|
| Lilly 12'; Lloyd 51' | Report |

Municipal Stadium, Vila Real de Santo António

2007 Algarve Cup

United States
Fifth title
