= 2006 Algarve Cup =

International women's football tournament

Tournament details
- Host country: Portugal
- City: Algarve
- Dates: 9–15 March
- Teams: 11 (from 3 confederations)

Final positions
- Champions: Germany (1st title)
- Runners-up: United States
- Third place: Sweden
- Fourth place: France

Tournament statistics
- Matches played: 20
- Goals scored: 55 (2.75 per match)

The 2006 Algarve Cup is the 13th edition of the Algarve Cup, an invitational women's football tournament held annually in Portugal. It took place 9–15 March 2006. Eleven teams participated in this edition of the Algarve Cup. Germany won the tournament defeating the US, 4–3, in the final-game. Sweden ended up third defeating France, 1–0, in the third-prize game.

== Format ==
The eleven teams are split into three groups that played a round-robin group stage, with 4 teams each in Group A and Group B, and 3 teams in Group C.

The format for this edition of the Algarve Cup is as follows: Groups A and B, containing the strongest ranked teams, are the only ones in contention to win the title. The group A and B winners contest the final – to win the Algarve Cup. The runners-up play for third place, and those that finish third in the groups play for fifth place. The teams in Group C played for places 7–12. The winner of Group C played the team that finished fourth in Group A or B (whichever has the better record) for seventh place. The Group C runner-up played the team who finishes last in Group A or B (with the worse record) for ninth place. The team that finished last in Group C does not participate in the play-off stage.

Points awarded in the group stage followed the standard formula of three points for a win, one point for a draw and zero points for a loss. In the case of two teams being tied on the same number of points in a group, their head-to-head result determined the higher place.

== Teams ==
The twelve invited teams were:

Team	FIFA Rankings (December 2005)
Germany	1
United States	2
Norway	3
Sweden	5
France	7
Denmark	8
China	9
Finland	16
Mexico	26
Republic of Ireland	32
Portugal (hosts)	40

- Northern Ireland (77) was scheduled to be the fourth participant in Group C, but they withdrew and were replaced by Slovakia (43), who also withdrew.

== Group stage ==
=== Group A ===
Team	Pld	W	D	L	GF	GA	GD	Pts
Germany	3	3	0	0	9	0	+9	9
Sweden	3	1	1	1	4	4	0	4
Norway	3	0	2	1	0	1	−1	2
Finland	3	0	1	2	1	9	−8	1

9 March 2006

Germany	5–0	Finland
Pohlers 59'; Prinz 63'; Garefrekes 71'; Behringer 80'; Fuss 85'	DfB Report (in German)

Estádio Algarve
Attendance: 100
9 March 2006

Norway	0–0	Sweden
	SvFF Report (in Swedish)

Loulé
11 March 2006

Sweden	0–3	Germany
	SvFF Report (in Swedish)	Prinz 29'; Behringer 44'; Wimbersky 58'

Loulé
11 March 2006
15:00

Finland	0–0	Norway
	Report

Alvor
Attendance: 225
Referee: Gasje Fatou
13 March 2006

Sweden	4–1	Finland
Svensson 26', 52', 85'; Mostrom 68'	SvFF Report (in Swedish)	Valkonen 85'

Lagos
13 March 2006

Germany	1–0	Norway
Wimbersky 93'	DfB Report (in German)

Estádio Algarve
Attendance: 400
Referee: Floarea Babadac (Romania)

=== Group B ===
Team	Pld	W	D	L	GF	GA	GD	Pts
United States	3	2	1	0	9	1	+8	7
France	3	1	1	1	4	6	−2	4
China	3	1	1	1	6	1	+5	4
Denmark	3	0	1	2	2	13	−11	1

- France takes 2nd place in Group B via head-to-head result against China
9 March 2006

China	0–0	United States
	Report

Faro
9 March 2006

Denmark	2–2	France
Nielsen 31'; Sørensen 50'		Coquet 18'; Tonazzi 26'

Faro
11 March 2006

France	1–0	China
Bussaglia 2'

Faro
11 March 2006

Denmark	0–5	United States
	Report	Wambach 16'; O'Reilly 29', 31'; Lilly 42'; Kai 72'

Faro
13 March 2006

United States	4–1	France
Lilly 1'; Wagner 49'; Tarpley 50'; Kai 76'	Report	Lattaf 64'

Faro-Loulé
13 March 2006

Denmark	0–6	China
		Duan 20' (34), 41'; Yue 28' (52); Xiaoyan 66'

Lagos

=== Group C ===
Team	Pld	W	D	L	GF	GA	GD	Pts
Mexico	2	1	1	0	6	0	+6	4
Republic of Ireland	2	1	1	0	1	0	+1	4
Portugal	2	0	0	2	0	7	−7	0

9 March 2006

Portugal	0–1	Republic of Ireland
	Report	Laura Hislop 29'

Alvor
11 March 2006

Republic of Ireland	0–0	Mexico

Vila Real de Santo Antonio
13 March 2006

Portugal	0–6	Mexico
	Report	Domínguez 4', 23'; Saucedo 30'; González 35'; Costa 42'; Maradiaga 77'

Silves

== Placement play-offs ==
=== Ninth place match ===
15 March 2006

Denmark	4–0	Republic of Ireland

Algarve

=== Seventh place match ===
15 March 2006

Finland	4–3	Mexico

Algarve

=== Fifth place match ===
15 March 2006
10:00

Norway	1–0	China
Rønning	Report

Algarve
Attendance: 100
Referee: Dagmar Damkova

=== Third place match ===
15 March 2006

Sweden	1–0	France
Schelin 51'	SvFF Report (in Swedish)

Algarve

=== Final ===
15 March 2006

Germany	0–0 (a.e.t.)	United States
	Report
Penalties
Behringer (penalty scored); Pohlers (penalty scored); Prinz (penalty missed); Okoyino Da Mbabi (penalty scored); Wimbersky (penalty scored)	4–3	Wagner (penalty scored); Boxx (penalty missed); Whitehill (penalty scored); Wambach (penalty missed); Lilly (penalty scored)

Estádio do Algarve, Faro-Loulé

2006 Algarve Cup

Germany
First title

== Final standings ==
Rank	Team
1st place, gold medalist(s)	Germany
2nd place, silver medalist(s)	United States
3rd place, bronze medalist(s)	Sweden
4	France
5	Norway
6	China
7	Finland
8	Mexico
9	Denmark
10	Republic of Ireland
11	Portugal
