= 2002 Four Nations Tournament (women's football) =

Tournament details
- Host country: China
- City: Guangzhou
- Dates: 23–27 January 2002
- Teams: 4 (from 3 confederations)

The 2002 Four Nations Tournament was an invitational women's football tournament held in China with four national teams participating in a round robin format. It was held in Guangzhou from January 23 to 25, 2002. Olympic champion Norway won the tournament with two wins and one loss, followed by Germany and world champion United States, while the hosts were last despite winning their first game.

== Final standings ==
Team	Pld	W	D	L	GF	GA	GD	Pts
Norway	3	2	0	1	5	3	+2	6
Germany	3	1	1	1	4	3	+1	4
United States	3	1	1	1	2	1	+1	4
China	3	1	0	2	2	6	−4	3

== Match results ==
23 January 2002

Norway	1–0	United States
Unni Lehn 4'

Huadu, Guangzhou
23 January 2002

China	2–1	Germany
Zhang Ouying 44'; Pu Wei 80'		Ariane Hingst 81'

Huadu, Guangzhou

25 January 2002

Germany	0–0	United States

Ying Tung, Guangzhou
25 January 2002

Norway	3–0	China
Trine Rønning 9'; Solveig Gulbrandsen 16'; Anita Rapp 47'

Ying Tung, Guangzhou

27 January 2002

Germany	3–1	Norway
Kerstin Garefrekes 50'; Birgit Prinz 57'; Bettina Wiegmann 75'		Solveig Gulbrandsen 12'

Tianhe, Guangzhou
27 January 2002

United States	2–0	China
Julie Foudy 3'; Tiffeny Milbrett 16'

Tianhe, Guangzhou
