= 2005 Four Nations Tournament (women's football) =

Tournament details
- Host country: China
- City: Quanzhou
- Dates: 28 January – 1 February 2005
- Teams: 4 (from 3 confederations)

Tournament statistics
- Matches played: 6
- Goals scored: 16 (2.67 per match)
- Top scorer(s): (Australia) Lisa de Vanna (Australia) Kate Gill (China) Han Duan (Germany) Renate Lingor (2 goals)

The 2005 Four Nations Tournament was the fifth edition of this invitational women's football tournament held in China with four national teams participating in a round robin format. It was held from January 28 to February 1, 2005, in the city of Quanzhou. China won the tournament on head-to-head against Australia.

== Participants ==
Team	FIFA Rankings (December 2004)
Germany	1
China (host)	6
Russia	12
Australia	15

== Final standings ==
Team	Pld	W	D	L	GF	GA	GD	Pts
China	3	2	0	1	6	3	+3	6
Australia	3	2	0	1	6	3	+3	6
Germany	3	2	0	1	3	1	+2	6
Russia	3	0	0	3	1	9	−8	0

== Match results ==
28 January 2005

Germany	0–1	Australia
		De Vanna 53'

Guangzhou
28 January 2005

China	3–1	Russia
Han Duan 45'; Ji Ting 80'; Bi Yan 81'		Komarova 60'

Guangzhou

30 January 2005

China	3–0	Australia
Pan Lina 61'; Han Duan 63'; Ren Liping 65'

Guangzhou
30 January 2005

Germany	1–0	Russia
Lingor 18'

Guangzhou

1 February 2005

Russia	0–5	Australia
		Garriock 35'; De Vanna 27'; Gill 51', 62'; Salisbury 85' (pen.)

Guangzhou
1 February 2005

China	0–2	Germany
		Carlson 7'; Lingor 22'

Guangzhou

== Goalscorers ==
There were 16 goals scored in 6 matches, for an average of 2.67 goals per match.

2 goals

- (Australia) Lisa de Vanna
- (Australia) Kate Gill
- (China) Han Duan
- (Germany) Renate Lingor

1 goal

- (Australia) Cheryl Salisbury
- (Australia) Heather Garriock
- (China) Bi Yan
- (China) Ji Ting
- (China) Pan Lina
- (China) Ren Liping
- (Germany) Britta Carlson
- (Russia) Galina Komarova
