= 2009 Four Nations Tournament (women's football) =

Tournament details
- Host country: China
- City: Guangzhou
- Dates: 10–14 January 2009
- Teams: 4 (from 3 confederations)
- Venue: Yuexiushan Stadium

The 2009 Four Nations Tournament was the ninth edition of this invitational tournament, held at Yuexiushan Stadium, in the city of Guangzhou, China. The tournament was won by China.

== Participants ==
Team	FIFA Rankings (December 2008)
China (host)	13
Finland	17
South Korea	22
New Zealand	24

== Venues ==
Guangzhou	Yuexiushan Stadium is located in China
Yuexiushan Stadium	Yuexiushan Stadium is located in China
23.139216°N 113.260739°E	Yuexiushan Stadium is located in China
Capacity: 25,000	Yuexiushan Stadium is located in China

== Final standings ==
Team	Pld	W	D	L	GF	GA	GD	Pts
China	3	3	0	0	8	0	+8	9
Korea Republic	3	2	0	1	8	4	+4	6
Finland	3	1	0	2	2	5	−3	3
New Zealand	3	0	0	3	3	12	−9	0

== Match results ==
10 January 2009

Korea Republic	4–0	Finland

Yuexiushan Stadium, Guangzhou
10 January 2009

China	6–0	New Zealand

Yuexiushan Stadium, Guangzhou

12 January 2009

China	1–0	Finland

Yuexiushan Stadium, Guangzhou
12 January 2009

Korea Republic	4–3	New Zealand

Yuexiushan Stadium, Guangzhou

14 January 2009

China	1–0	Korea Republic

Yuexiushan Stadium, Guangzhou
14 January 2009

New Zealand	0–2	Finland

Yuexiushan Stadium, Guangzhou
