= 2007 Four Nations Tournament (women's football) =

Tournament details
- Host country: China
- City: Guangzhou
- Dates: 26–30 January 2007
- Teams: 4 (from 3 confederations)
- Venue(s): Guangdong Olympic Stadium

The 2007 Four Nations Tournament was the seventh edition of the Four Nations Tournament, an invitational women's football tournament held in China. The venue for this edition of the tournament was Guangdong Olympic Stadium, in the city of Guangzhou.

== Teams ==
Listed were the participating teams.

| Team | FIFA Rankings (December 2006) |
|---|---|
| Germany | 1 |
| United States | 2 |
| China (host) | 9 |
| England | 12 |

== Venues ==
| Guangzhou | Guangdong Olympic Stadium is located in China |
| Guangdong Olympic Stadium | Guangdong Olympic Stadium is located in China |
| 23.137656°N 113.403519°E | Guangdong Olympic Stadium is located in China |
| Capacity: 80,012 | Guangdong Olympic Stadium is located in China |

== Final standings ==
| Team | Pld | W | D | L | GF | GA | GD | Pts |
|---|---|---|---|---|---|---|---|---|
| United States | 3 | 1 | 2 | 0 | 3 | 1 | +2 | 5 |
| China | 3 | 1 | 1 | 1 | 2 | 2 | 0 | 4 |
| Germany | 3 | 0 | 3 | 0 | 0 | 0 | 0 | 3 |
| England | 3 | 0 | 2 | 1 | 1 | 3 | −2 | 2 |

== Match results ==
26 January 2007

| China | 2–0 | England |
|---|---|---|
| Zhang 4'; Han 45' |

Guangdong Olympic Stadium, Guangzhou
26 January 2007

| United States | 0–0 | Germany |

Guangdong Olympic Stadium, Guangzhou
Attendance: 1,500
Referee: Deng Junxia (China)

28 January 2007

| China | 0–0 | Germany |

Guangdong Olympic Stadium, Guangzhou
28 January 2007

| United States | 1–1 | England |
|---|---|---|
| O'Reilly 17' | | Scott 47' |

Guangdong Olympic Stadium, Guangzhou
Attendance: 3,000
Referee: Bibiana Steinhaus (Germany)

30 January 2007

| China | 0–2 | United States |
|---|---|---|
| | | Chalupny 45+1'; Kai 56' |

Guangdong Olympic Stadium, Guangzhou
Attendance: 8,000
Referee: Amy Rayner (England)
30 January 2007

| England | 0–0 | Germany |

Guangdong Olympic Stadium, Guangzhou
