= Wales women's national football team results (2000–2009) =

- Win Draw Loss

This is a list of the 57 Wales women's national football team results and scheduled fixtures from 2000 to 2009.

== Fixtures and results ==
=== 2000 ===
26 March 2000 UEFA Women's Euro 2001 qualifying	Belgium	6–0	Wales	Ciney, Belgium
16:00 (CEST)	Saelens 4', 24', 90'; Callebaut 27'; Dermul 70'; Heiremans 83'	Report		Stadium: Lambert Stadion; Referee: Nadezhda Ulyanovskaya (Russia)

14 May 2000 UEFA Women's Euro 2001 qualifying	Wales	0–1	Austria	Newtown, Wales
15:00 (BST)		Report	Spieler 55'	Stadium: Latham Park

27 May 2000 UEFA Women's Euro 2001 qualifying	Poland	2–2	Wales	Piekary Śląskie, Poland
16:00 (CEST)	Drozdowska 30'; Gibek 55'	Report	Davies 39'; Martyn 90'	Stadium: MOSiR, Piekary Śląskie

=== 2001 ===
10 October 2001 2003 FIFA Women's World Cup qualification (UEFA)	Wales	0–2	Austria	Llanelli, Wales
15::00 (BST)		Report	Stallinger 68'; Schalkhammer-Hufnagl 80'	Stadium: Stebonheath Park

28 October 2001 2003 FIFA Women's World Cup qualification (UEFA)	Scotland	5–1	Wales	Livingston, Scotland
15::00 (GMT)	Fleeting 10', 34', 68', 75'; James 47'	Report	Ludlow 8'	Stadium: Tony Macaroni Arena

17 November 2001 2003 FIFA Women's World Cup qualification (UEFA)	Wales	0–2	Belgium	Rhyl, Wales
15::00 (GMT)		Report	Verelst 12'; Ebhodaghe 84'	Stadium: Belle Vue

=== 2002 ===
1 March 2002 2002 Algarve Cup	Portugal	0–1	Wales	Quarteira, Portugal
15:00 (CET)		Report	Martyn 7'	Stadium: Estádio Municipal de Quarteira; Referee: Wendy Toms (England)

3 March 2002 2002 Algarve Cup	Canada	4–0	Wales	Lagoa, Portugal
15:00 (CET)	Sinclair 24', 69'; Lang 63', 90'	Report		Stadium: Estádio Capitão Josino da Costa; Referee: Wendy Toms (England)

5 March 2002 2002 Algarve Cup	Wales	0–1	Scotland	Silves, Portugal
15:00 (CET)		Report	Fleeting 25'	Stadium: Dr. Francisco Vieira Stadium; Referee: Sandy Hunt (USA)

7 March 2002 2002 Algarve Cup	Wales	0–4	Portugal	Montechoro, Portugal
15:00 (CET)		Report	Silva 3', 16'; Cristina 20', 29'	Stadium: CD Montechoro

24 March 2002 2003 FIFA Women's World Cup qualification	Belgium	1–0	Wales	La Louvière, Belgium
15:00 (CET)	Jones 28' (o.g.)	Report		Stadium: Stade Raymond Dienne

19 May 2002 2003 FIFA Women's World Cup qualification	Wales	0–2	Scotland	Merthyr Tydfil, Wales
15::00 (BST)		Report	James 54'; Fleeting 81'	Stadium: Penydarren Park

25 May 2002 2003 FIFA Women's World Cup qualification	Austria	1–1	Wales	Ottensheim, Austria
15:00 (CET)	Spieler 45'	Report	Foster 45'	Stadium: Donaustadion (Ottensheim)

=== 2003 ===
14 March 2003 2003 Algarve Cup	Portugal	1–1	Wales	Quarteira, Portugal
15:00 (CET)	Silva 11'	Report	Foster 47'	Stadium: Estádio Municipal de Quarteira; Referee: Jennifer Bennet (USA)

16 March 2003 2003 Algarve Cup	Wales	1–3	Republic of Ireland	Guia, Portugal
15:00 (CET)	Martyn 20'	Report	O'Toole 17', 81'; Grant 44'	Stadium: Complexo Desportivo Arsénio Catuna; Referee: Jennifer Bennet (USA)

18 March 2003 2003 Algarve Cup	Wales	0–2	Greece	Quarteira, Portugal
15:00 (CET)			Stavroula 7'; Holan 80'	Stadium: Estádio Municipal de Quarteira; Referee: Noelle Robin (France)

20 March 2003 2003 Algarve Cup	Wales	2–2 (2–4 p)	Republic of Ireland	Montechoro, Portugal
15:00 (CET)	Durrant 6'; Green 88'	Report	Scanlan 77', 83'	Stadium: CD Montechoro; Referee: Noelle Robin (France)

28 October 2003 Friendly	Wales	1–1	Portugal	Swansea, Wales
19:45 (GMT)	Ludlow 84'	Report		Stadium: Vetch Field; Referee: Phil Southall (Wales)

30 October 2003 Friendly	Wales	1–0	Portugal	Llanelli, Wales
19:45 (GMT)	Ludlow 16'	Report		Stadium: Stebonheath Park

=== 2004 ===
14 March 2004 2004 Algarve Cup	Greece	1–0	Wales	Faro, Portugal
13:45 (CET)	Papadopoulou	Report		Stadium: Estádio de São Luís; Referee: Betinna Norman (Denmark)

16 March 2004 2004 Algarve Cup	Portugal	2–3	Wales	Albufeira, Portugal
16:45 (CET)	Carla Couto	Report	Daley 41' (pen.); Foster 54'; Davies 81'	Stadium: Estádio Municipal de Albufeira; Referee: Lena Arwedal (Sweden)

18 March 2004 2004 Algarve Cup	Wales	3–1	Northern Ireland	Guia, Portugal
13:45 (CET)	Foster 10'; H. Jones 30'; Ludlow 82'	Report	Turner	Stadium: Complexo Desportivo Arsénio Catuna; Referee: Efthalia Mitsi (Greece)

20 March 2004 2004 Algarve Cup	Wales	0–4	Finland	Ferreiras, Portugal
15:00 (CET)		Report	Kalmari; Rantanen; Talonen; Mäkinen	Stadium: Desportivo da Nora Park; Referee: Lena Arwedal (Sweden)

=== 2006 ===
15 March 2006 Friendly	Switzerland	3–2	Wales	Kloten, Switzerland
15:00 (CET)	Orlando 8', 86'; Moser 65'	Report	Hopkins 17'; Vaughan 24'	Stadium: Fussballanlage Stighag

26 March 2006 2007 FIFA Women's World Cup qualification	Wales	3–0	Moldova	Latham Park, Newtown
	Foster 11'; Hopkins 24'; Ludlow 62'			Attendance: 660; Referee: Teixeira (Portugal)

30 March 2006 2007 FIFA Women's World Cup qualification	Wales	1–1	Israel	Cardiff, Wales
14:00 (BST)	Fishlock 60'	Report	Shelina 30'	Stadium: Ninian Park; Referee: Carina Vitulano (Italian Football Federation)

23 April 2006 2007 FIFA Women's World Cup qualification	Wales	0–0	Estonia	Rhyl, Wales
15:00 (BST)		Report		Stadium: Belle Vue; Referee: Elia Martinez (Spain)

7 May 2006 2007 FIFA Women's World Cup qualification	Moldova	0–3	Wales	Chișinău, Moldova
13:00 (EEST)		Report	Ludlow 53'; Jones 58'; Morgan 76'	Stadium: Dinamo Stadium; Referee: Iwona Malek-Wybraniec (Poland)

2 August 2006 Friendly	Bulgaria	3–0	Wales	Sofia, Bulgaria
15:00 (EEST)		Report		Stadium: Vasil Levski National Stadium

20 August 2006 2007 FIFA Women's World Cup qualification	Israel	1–3	Wales	Waalwijk, Netherlands
	Ohana 67'	Report	Foster 29'; Fishlock 37'; Ludlow 90+1'	Stadium: Mandemakers Stadion; Referee: Anri Saarivainio Hänninen, (Finnish Football Association

26 August 2006 2007 FIFA Women's World Cup qualification	Estonia	0–7	Wales	Tallinn, Estonia
15:00 (EEST)		Report	Ludlow 34', 37'; Fishlock 47', 48'; Green 50'; Hopkins 70', 90+3'	Stadium: Kadrioru staadion Referee: Berta Tavares (Portugal)

18 November 2006 UEFA Women's Euro 2009 qualifying	Wales	2–1	Faroe Islands	Strumica, North Macedonia
13:00 (CET)	Foster 32'; Holt 90'	Report	Josephsen 90+2'	Stadium: Stadion Mladost; Referee: Kirsi Heikkinen (Finland)

20 November 2006 UEFA Women's Euro 2009 qualifying	Wales	6–0	Macedonia	Strumica, North Macedonia
13:00 (CET)	Harries 9'; Ludlow 15'; Green 24'; Foster 36', 60'; Holt 54'	Report		Stadium: Stadion Mladost; Referee: Kirsi Heikkinen (Finland)

23 November 2006 UEFA Women's Euro 2009 qualifying	Kazakhstan	1–2	Wales	Strumica, North Macedonia
13:00 (CET)	Yalova 56'	Report	Harries 23'; Ludlow 73'	Stadium: Stadion Mladost; Referee: Knarik Grigoryan (Armenia)

=== 2007 ===
24 April 2007 Friendly	Wales	2–1	Republic of Ireland	Tredegar, Wales
15:00 (UTC+1)	Edwards 27'; Manley 45'	Report		Stadium: Tredegar Recreation Ground

26 April 2007 Friendly	Wales	1–4	Republic of Ireland	Goytre, Wales
15:00 (UTC+1)	Harries 20'	Report		Stadium: Glenhafod Park Stadium

10 May 2007 UEFA Women's Euro 2009 qualifying	Wales	0–6	Germany	Haverfordwest, Wales
16:20 (UTC+1)		Report	Prinz 8', 18', 87'; Stegemann 44'; Garefrekes 81'; Müller 86'	Stadium: Bridge Meadow Stadium; Referee: Marianne Svendsen (Denmark)

26 August 2007 UEFA Women's Euro 2009 qualifying	Netherlands	2–1	Wales	Volendam, Netherlands
15:00 (UTC+2)	Melis 47'; Smit 64'	Report	Jones 75'	Stadium: Veronica; Referee: Berta Maria Correia Tavares (Portugal)

28 October 2007 UEFA Women's Euro 2009 qualifying	Wales	0–2	Switzerland	Rhyl, Wales
13:30 (UTC)		Report	Graf 41'; Moser 83'	Stadium: Belle Vue; Referee: Danijela Marković (Serbia)

31 October 2007 UEFA Women's Euro 2009 qualifying	Belgium	1–0	Wales	Dessel, Belgium
18:00 (UTC+1)	Zeler 75'	Report		Stadium: Lorzestraat; Referee: Katalin Kulcsár (Hungary)

=== 2008 ===
30 January 2008 Friendly	Portugal	1–1	Wales	Mafra, Portugal, Portugal
15:00 (UTC+1)		Report	Edwards 18'	Stadium: Campo Dr. Mário Silveira

17 February 2008 UEFA Women's Euro 2009 qualifying	Wales	0–1	Belgium	Barry, Wales
13:30 (UTC)		Report	Maes 69'	Stadium: Jenner Park Stadium; Referee: Sabine Bonnin (France)

20 February 2008 UEFA Women's Euro 2009 qualifying	Wales	0–1	Netherlands	Newport, Wales
18:30 (UTC)		Report	Melis 47'	Stadium: Newport Stadium; Referee: Teodora Albon (Romania)

8 May 2008 UEFA Women's Euro 2009 qualifying	Switzerland	2–0	Wales	Oberdorf, Switzerland
19:00 (CEST)	Dickenmann 44', 76' (pen.)	Report		Stadium: Stadion z’Hof, Referee: Ilonka Milanova Djaleva (Bulgaria)

29 May 2008 UEFA Women's Euro 2009 qualifying	Germany	4–0	Wales	Kassel, Germany
19:00 (CEST)	Hingst 9'; Pohlers 12'; Krahn 30'; Behringer 77'	Report		Stadium: Auestadion; Referee: Rachel Cohen (Israel)

30 September 2008 Friendly	Luxembourg	1–6	Wales	Hesperange, Luxembourg
15:00 (UTC+2)		Report	Jones 23'; Lander 31'; Harries 43'; Manley 49'; Fishlock 54'; Ludlow 90'	Stadium: Stade Alphonse Theis

12 November 2008 Friendly	Wales	1–2	Finland	Carmarthen, Wales
15:00 (UTC)	Lander 25'	Report		Stadium: Parc Myrddin

14 November 2008 Friendly	Wales	1–1	Finland	Goytre, Wales
15:00 (UTC)	Ludlow 58'	Report		Stadium: Glenhafod Park Stadium

=== 2009 ===
4 March 2009 2009 Algarve Cup	Wales	1–2	Austria	Alvor, Portugal
15:00 (UTC+1)	Fishlock 35'	Report	Entner 47'; Walzl 85'	Stadium: Restinga Stadium]

6 March 2009 2009 Algarve Cup	Portugal	2–1	Wales	Albufeira, Portugal
17:45 (UTC+1)	Fernandes 27'; Cristina 57' (pen.)	Report	Ludlow 70'	Stadium: Municipal Stadium

9 March 2009 2009 Algarve Cup	Poland	1–5	Wales	Loulé, Portugal
17:45 (UTC+1)	Kawalec 80'	Report	Ludlow 22' 32'; Harries 38' 42'; Lander 86'	Stadium: Municipal Stadium

11 March 2009 2009 Algarve Cup	Wales	1–2	Poland	Albufeira, Portugal
11:30 (UTC+1)	Fishlock 14'	Report	Sznyrowska 10'; Pożerska 88'	Stadium: CD Montechoro

23 August 2009 Friendly	Wales	3–0	Slovenia	Llanelli, Wales
15:00 (UTC+1)	Harries 13', 50'; Dykes 43'	Report		Stadium: Stebonheath Park

20 September 2009 2011 FIFA Women's World Cup qualification	Wales	0–1	Belgium	Haverfordwest, Wales
15:00 (UTC+1)		Report	Verelst 90+4'	Stadium: Bridge Meadow Stadium; Referee: Ann-Helen Østervold (Norway)

23 September 2009 2011 FIFA Women's World Cup qualification	Wales	2–0	Czech Republic	Llanelli, Wales
19:00 UTC+1	Fishlock 16'; Plewa 84'	Report		Stadium: Stebonheath Park; Referee: Hilal Tuba Tosun Ayer (Turkey)

25 October 2009 2011 FIFA Women's World Cup qualification	Czech Republic	2–1	Wales	Prague, Czech Republic
14:00 UTC+1	Pincová 8', 22'	Report	Fishlock 17'	Stadium: Ďolíček Stadion; Referee: Gyöngyi Krisztina Gaál (Hungary)

28 October 2009 2011 FIFA Women's World Cup qualification	Azerbaijan	2–1	Wales	Baku, Azerbaijan
14:00 UTC+4	Atayeva 33'; Kaziyeva 43'	Report	Lander 29'	Stadium: Ismet Qaibov Stadium; Referee: Marija Margareta Damjanović (Croatia)
