= Republic of Ireland women's national football team results (2000–2009) =

This article contains the results of the Republic of Ireland women's national football team between 2000 and 2009. During the 2000s the Republic of Ireland competed in three UEFA Women's Championship qualification campaigns – 2001, 2005 and 2009 – and three FIFA Women's World Cup campaigns – 2003, 2007 and 2011. They also played in the 2003, 2006, 2007 and 2008 Algarve Cups. The Republic of Ireland also went on three tours of the United States – 2004, 2006 and 2008. During the decade the Republic of Ireland also enjoyed some minor successes. In 2000 they won the Celt Cup – a four team tournament that also featured Northern Ireland, Scotland and the Isle of Man. In their 2005 UEFA Women's Euro campaign they also won their second level group, finishing above Romania, Croatia, Bosnia and Herzegovina and Malta. This effectively saw them promoted to the elite group of nations which competed directly for qualification to major tournaments.

== Results ==
=== 2000 ===
29 April 2000 UEFA Women's Euro 2001 qualifying	Republic of Ireland	0–3	Scotland	Dublin, Republic of Ireland
		Report	Fleeting 44', 45'; James 69'	Stadium: Richmond Park; Referee: Christine Frai (Germany)

6 May 2000 UEFA Women's Euro 2001 qualifying	Croatia	1–3	Republic of Ireland	Velika Gorica, Croatia
	Jaksic 89'	Report	Reilly 56'; Thorpe 73'; Grant 90'	Stadium: ŠRC Velika Gorica; Referee: Rita Ruiz Tacoronte (Spain)

28 May 2000 UEFA Women's Euro 2001 qualifying	Republic of Ireland	0–4	Czech Republic	Arklow, Republic of Ireland
		Report	Chlumecká 21'; Ščasná 68'; Dudová 74'; Došková 81'	Stadium: Arklow Town F.C. Referee: Nadezhda Ulyanovskaya (Russia)

22 September 2000 Celt Cup	Republic of Ireland	1–0	Scotland	Carryduff, Northern Ireland
	Thorpe	(Report)

23 September 2000 Celt Cup	Republic of Ireland	2–0	Northern Ireland	Carryduff, Northern Ireland
	Thorpe; Connolly

=== 2001 ===
8 June 2001 Friendly (Note: Iceland fielded an under–21 team)	Iceland	2–1	Republic of Ireland	Iceland
	Goal	Report	Grant

11 August 2001 Friendly	Republic of Ireland	1–2	Scotland	Dublin, Ireland
	O'Toole (?)	Report		Stadium: AUL Complex

12 August 2001 Friendly	Republic of Ireland	4–1	Scotland	Dublin, Ireland
	O'Toole (?), 55'; Gee 70'	Report	Fleeting (?)	Stadium: AUL Complex

8 September 2001 2003 FIFA Women's World Cup qualification	FR Yugoslavia	5–0	Republic of Ireland	Aleksinački Rudnik, Yugoslavia
	Stojanović 2', 53', 57'; Stefanović 76'; Stojiljković 88' (pen.)	Report		Stadium: FK Rudar Alpos; Referee: Marian Dorobanțu (Romania)

12 September 2001 2003 FIFA Women's World Cup qualification	Moldova	0–4	Republic of Ireland	Chișinău, Romania
		Report	Hughes 21'; Thorpe 30', 79'; O'Toole 57'	Stadium: Stadionul Republican; Referee: Zsolt Szabó (Hungary)

17 November 2001 2003 FIFA Women's World Cup qualification	Republic of Ireland	5–0	Greece	Dublin, Ireland
	Scanlan 25'; O'Toole 54', 73'; Thorpe 56'; Kierans 86'	Report		Stadium: Dalymount Park; Referee: Caroline De Boeck (Belgium)

=== 2002 ===
6 March 2002 Friendly (Note: Sweden fielded an under–21 team)	Republic of Ireland	1–2	Sweden	Dublin, Ireland
	O'Toole	(Report)		Stadium: AUL Complex

24 March 2002 2003 FIFA Women's World Cup qualification	Greece	1–3	Republic of Ireland	Rethymno, Greece
	Lazarou 89' (pen.)	Report	Hughes 16'; O'Toole 46', 65'	Stadium: Rethymno Gallos Stadium; Referee: Regina Belksma-Konink (Netherlands)

6 April 2002 2003 FIFA Women's World Cup qualification	Republic of Ireland	6–0	Moldova	Longford, Ireland
	O'Toole 11', 38' (pen.); Hughes 21'; Thorpe 60'; Saurin 67'; Tracy 78'	Report		Stadium: Flancare Park; Referee: Irina Pavlova

18 May 2002 2003 FIFA Women's World Cup qualification	Republic of Ireland	0–1	FR Yugoslavia	Longford, Ireland
		Report	Smiljković 76'	Stadium: Flancare Park; Referee: Tonje Overgaard Nordby

=== 2003 ===
14 March 2003 2003 Algarve Cup	Republic of Ireland	0–0	Greece	Lagoa, Portugal

16 March 2003 2003 Algarve Cup	Republic of Ireland	3–1	Wales	Guia, Portugal
	Olivia O'Toole 17', 81'; Ciara Grant 44'		Ayshea Martyn 20'

18 March 2003 2003 Algarve Cup	Portugal	3–2	Republic of Ireland	Quarteira, Portugal
	Edite Fernandes 45'; Ana Rita Gomes 43'; Carla Monteiro 71'	Report	Michele O'Brien 31'; Claire Scanlan 28'

20 March 2003 2003 Algarve Cup	Republic of Ireland	2–2 (4–2 p)	Wales	Montechoro, Portugal
	Claire Scanlan 77', 83'		Milly Durrant 6'; Michelle Green 88'

18 May 2003 UEFA Women's Euro 2005 qualifying	Republic of Ireland	6–0	Bosnia and Herzegovina	Dublin, Ireland
	O'Toole 19' (pen.), 45', 49' (pen.), 52'; O'Brien 58'; Curtis 90'	Report		Stadium: Richmond Park; Referee: Iwona Malek-wybraniec (Poland)

25 May 2003 UEFA Women's Euro 2005 qualifying	Croatia	0–0	Republic of Ireland	Velika Gorica, Croatia
		Report		Stadium: ŠRC Velika Gorica; Referee: Antonia Kokotou (Greece)

28 June 2003 UEFA Women's Euro 2005 qualifying	Republic of Ireland	2–2	Romania	Dublin, Ireland
	O'Connor 45+4'; Grant 90+5'	Report	Pufulete 12', 76'	Stadium: Tolka Park; Referee: Tatjana Pavlovic (Serbia)

22 October 2003 UEFA Women's Euro 2005 qualifying	Malta	0–9	Republic of Ireland	Ta' Qali, Malta
		Report	O'Toole 12', 24', 29'; Curtis 35', 43'; Hislop 62', 89'; Grant 78'; Tracy 84'	Stadium: Ta' Qali National Stadium; Referee: Sabina De Nitto (Italy)

=== 2004 ===
1 January 2004 Celt Cup	France	1–1	Republic of Ireland	France
		Report

10 April 2004 UEFA Women's Euro 2005 qualifying	Republic of Ireland	8–1	Croatia	Dublin, Ireland
	O'Toole 3'; Deasley 20', 88'; Hughes 40'; Curtis 44'; Horvat 59' (o.g.); Hislop 79', 80'	Report	Kozic 51'	Stadium: Richmond Park; Referee: Gyöngyi Gaál (Hungary)

1 May 2004 UEFA Women's Euro 2005 qualifying	Romania	1–1	Republic of Ireland	Bucharest, Romania
	Olar 45+1'	Report	Boyle 3'	Stadium: Stadionul Mogoșoaia; Referee: Geja Mulder (Netherlands)

9 May 2004 UEFA Women's Euro 2005 qualifying	Bosnia and Herzegovina	1–4	Republic of Ireland	Vogošća, Bosnia and Herzegovina
	Pehić 58'	Report	O'Toole 30'; Hislop 44', 53'; Curtis 67'	Stadium: Stadion Hakija Mrso; Referee: Rachel Cohen (Israel)

25 June 2004 UEFA Women's Euro 2005 qualifying	Republic of Ireland	5–0	Malta	Dublin, Ireland
	O'Toole 12', 51' (pen.), 78'; O'Connor 28'; Grant 83'	Report		Stadium: Dalymount Park; Referee: Lena Arwedahl (Sweden)

12 October 2004 Friendly	Faroe Islands	1–2	Republic of Ireland	Klaksvík, Faroe Islands
	Bjartalíð 72'	[Report]	Griffin 66'; Thorpe 76'	Stadium: Við Djúpumýrar; Attendance: 450; Referee: Páll Augustinussen (Faroe Islands)

20 October 2004 Friendly	United States	5–1	Republic of Ireland	Chicago, Illinois, United States
	Parlow 35', 42', 59'; Wambach 54'; Reddick 56'	[Report]		Stadium: Soldier Field; Attendance: 12,856

23 October 2004 Friendly	United States	5–0	Republic of Ireland	Houston, Texas, United States
	Wambach 47', 76', 79', 84', 90'	[Report]		Stadium: Reliant Stadium; Attendance: 16,991

=== 2005 ===
9 July 2005 2007 FIFA Women's World Cup qualification	Russia	5–1	Republic of Ireland	Moscow, Russia
15:00 UTC+4	Kurochkina 2'; Zaitseva 33'; Boyle 35' (o.g.); Mokshanova 42'; Barbashina 48'	(Report)	O'Brien 70'	Stadium: Moskvich Stadium; Referee: Schett (Austria)

25 September 2005 2007 FIFA Women's World Cup qualification	Scotland	0–0	Republic of Ireland	Perth, Scotland
14:00 UTC+1		(Report)		Stadium: McDiarmid Park; Referee: Spinelli (Italy)

=== 2006 ===
9 March 2006 2006 Algarve Cup	Portugal	0–1	Republic of Ireland	Alvor, Portugal
15:00 UTC+0		Report	Laura Hislop 29'

11 March 2006 2006 Algarve Cup	Republic of Ireland	0–0	Mexico	Vila Real de Santo António, Portugal

15 March 2006 2006 Algarve Cup	Denmark	4–0	Republic of Ireland	Lagoa, Portugal
10:00 UTC+0	Paaske-Sørensen 19', 38'; Pape 32'; Eggers Nielsen 78'	(Report)		Stadium: Estádio Capitão Josino da Costa; Attendance: 75; Referee: Patricia da Silva (Uruguay)

25 March 2006 2007 FIFA Women's World Cup qualification	Switzerland	2–0	Republic of Ireland	Biel, Switzerland
17:00 UTC+1	Dickenmann 23', 44'	(Report)		Stadium: Gurzelen Stadion; Referee: Albon (Romania)

22 April 2006 2007 FIFA Women's World Cup qualification	Republic of Ireland	2–0	Switzerland	Dublin, Ireland
17:00 UTC+1	Grant 23'; O'Toole 90'	(Report)		Stadium: Richmond Park; Referee: Wnuk (Poland)

6 May 2006 2007 FIFA Women's World Cup qualification	Republic of Ireland	0–2	Scotland	Dublin, Ireland
19:00 UTC+1		(Report)	Love 47'; Fleeting 81'	Stadium: Richmond Park; Referee: Cohen (Israel)

10 May 2006 2007 FIFA Women's World Cup qualification	Germany	1–0	Republic of Ireland	Cottbus, Germany
16:00 UTC+2	Wimbersky 3'	(Report)		Stadium: Stadion der Freundschaft; Referee: Tvarijonaite (Lithuania)

17 June 2006 2007 FIFA Women's World Cup qualification	Republic of Ireland	0–2	Russia	Dublin, Ireland
19:00 UTC+1		(Report)	Kurochkina 17'; Barbashina 81'	Stadium: Richmond Park; Referee: Olander (Estonia)

23 July 2006 Friendly	United States	5–0	Republic of Ireland	San Diego, California, United States
13:00 UTC−7	O'Reilly 21'; Whitehill 43'; Wambach 60'; Kai 78'; Rapinoe 90'	(Report)		Attendance: 3,574

26 August 2006 2007 FIFA Women's World Cup qualification	Republic of Ireland	0–3	Germany	Dublin, Ireland
19:00 UTC+1		(Report)	Wimbersky 2'; Prinz 16'; Garefrekes 45'	Stadium: Richmond Park; Referee: Arwedahl (Sweden)

9 September 2006 Friendly	Republic of Ireland	0–1	Italy	Dublin, Ireland
15:00 UTC+1		Report		Stadium: Richmond Park

=== 2007 ===
7 March 2007 2007 Algarve Cup	Portugal	1–1	Republic of Ireland	Lagos, Portugal
	Martins 59'	Report	Curtis 7'	Stadium: Estádio Municipal

9 March 2007 2007 Algarve Cup	Iceland	1–1	Republic of Ireland	Lagos, Portugal
	Logadóttir 36'		O'Toole 72'	Stadium: Estádio Municipal

12 March 2007 2007 Algarve Cup	Italy	4–1	Republic of Ireland	Silves, Portugal
	Panico 17'; Fuselli 58', 61'; Gama 64'		Byrne 35'	Stadium: Estádio Dr. Francisco Vieira

14 March 2007 2007 Algarve Cup	Republic of Ireland	0–0 (5–4 p)	Portugal	Ferreiras, Portugal
10:00 UTC+0		Report		Stadium: Estádio da Nora

1 April 2007 UEFA Women's Euro 2009 qualifying	Republic of Ireland	2–1	Hungary	Dublin, Ireland
15:00 UTC+1	Taylor 43'; Byrne 50'	Report	Gáspár 28'	Stadium: Tolka Park; Referee: Marija Damjanović (Croatia)

30 May 2007 UEFA Women's Euro 2009 qualifying	Republic of Ireland	1–2	Italy	Dublin, Ireland
19:45 UTC+1	O'Toole 76'	Report	Paliotti 40'; Panico 59'	Stadium: Belfield Park; Referee: Tanja Schett (Austria)

25 August 2007 UEFA Women's Euro 2009 qualifying	Romania	0–2	Republic of Ireland	Mogoșoaia, Romania
10:30 UTC+3		Report	Curtis 12', 14'	Stadium: Stadionul Mogoșoaia; Referee: Rachel Cohen (Israel)

27 October 2007 UEFA Women's Euro 2009 qualifying	Republic of Ireland	2–1	Romania	Dublin, Ireland
15:00 UTC+1	O'Brien 18'; Curtis 31'	Report	Pufulete 40'	Stadium: Richmond Park; Referee: Kirsi Heikkinen (Finland)

=== 2008 ===
27 January 2008 Friendly	Republic of Ireland	1–1	Netherlands	Dublin, Ireland
	Curtis 55'	Report	Melis 44'	Stadium: Frank Cooke Park; Referee: T. Traynor

2 February 2008 Friendly	Republic of Ireland	4–1	Poland	Dublin, Ireland
	O'Toole; Curtis; O'Gorman 30'; Tracy 72'	Report	Winczo 53' (pen.)	Stadium: John Hyland Park

8 February 2008 Unofficial friendly	Republic of Ireland	1–0	(England) Arsenal Ladies	Dublin, Ireland
	O'Toole	(Report)		Stadium: Dalymount Park

16 February 2008 UEFA Women's Euro 2009 qualifying	Italy	4–1	Republic of Ireland	Villacidro, Italy
15:00 UTC+1	Fuselli 83'; Gabbiadini 85'; Panico 86'; Conti 90+1'	Report	Taylor 13'	Stadium: Stadio Comunale; Referee: Natalia Avdonchenko (Russia)

5 March 2008 2008 Algarve Cup	Portugal	2–0	Republic of Ireland	Faro, Portugal
15:45 UTC+0	Fernandes 86'; Vieira 90+2'			Stadium: Estádio Algarve

7 March 2008 2008 Algarve Cup	Republic of Ireland	1–4	Iceland	Lagos, Portugal
16:30 UTC+0	Grant 23'		Arnardóttir 7'; Viðarsdóttir 12', 40'; Gunnarsdóttir 19'	Stadium: Municipal Stadium

10 March 2008 2008 Algarve Cup	Poland	0–1	Republic of Ireland	Lagos, Portugal
15:45 UTC+0			Grant 35'	Stadium: Municipal Stadium

12 March 2008 2008 Algarve Cup	Republic of Ireland	2–2 (5–6 p)	Poland	Guia, Portugal
10:00 UTC+0	O'Brien; O'Gorman		Stobba 23'; Winczo 48'	Stadium: Arsenio Catuna Complex

23 April 2008 UEFA Women's Euro 2009 qualifying	Hungary	0–2	Republic of Ireland	Miskolc, Hungary
13:00 UTC+2		Report	O'Brien 1'; Curtis 63'	Stadium: Diósgyöri Stadion; Referee: Aneliya Sinabova (Bulgaria)

25 June 2008 UEFA Women's Euro 2009 qualifying	Republic of Ireland	0–5	Sweden	Bray, Ireland
19:45 UTC+1		Report	Westberg 18', 73'; Svensson 23'; Öqvist 28'; Schelin 86'	Stadium: Carlisle Grounds; Referee: Claudine Brohet (Belgium)

13 September 2008 Friendly	United States	2–0	Republic of Ireland	Philadelphia, Pennsylvania, United States
20:00 UTC−4	Kai 32'; O'Reilly 86'	Report		Stadium: Lincoln Financial Field; Attendance: 13,176; Referee: Kari Seitz (USA); Assistant referees: Marlene Duffy (USA); Veronica Perez (USA); Fourth official: Teresa Miguel (USA)

17 September 2008 Friendly	United States	1–0	Republic of Ireland	East Rutherford, New Jersey, United States
19:30 UTC−4	Kai 72'	Report		Stadium: Giants Stadium; Attendance: 4,227; Referee: Sandra Serafini (USA); Assistant referees: Debbie Coleman (USA); Meredith Hackett (USA); Fourth official: Danielle Magouirk (USA)

20 September 2008 Friendly	United States	2–0	Republic of Ireland	Bridgeview, Illinois, United States
18:00 UTC−5	Chalupny 19'; Markgraf 31' (pen.)	Report		Stadium: Toyota Park; Attendance: 5,390; Referee: Jennifer Bennett (USA); Assistant referees: Stephanie Toth (USA); Veronica Hefner (USA); Fourth official: Margaret Domka (USA)

1 October 2008 UEFA Women's Euro 2009 qualifying	Sweden	1–0	Republic of Ireland	Trelleborg, Sweden
19:00 UTC+2	Edlund 42'	Report		Stadium: Vångavallen; Referee: Tanja Schett (Austria)

=== 2009 ===
15 February 2009 Friendly	France	2–0	Republic of Ireland	France
	Blanc 67'; Bussaglia	Report

19 September 2009 2011 FIFA Women's World Cup qualification	Switzerland	2–0	Republic of Ireland	Wohlen, Switzerland
17:00 UTC+2	Moser 56'; Dickenmann 64' (pen.)	Report		Stadium: Stadion Niedermatten; Referee: Christine Beck (Germany)

24 September 2009 2011 FIFA Women's World Cup qualification	Republic of Ireland	2–1	Kazakhstan	Cork, Ireland
19:30 UTC+1	O'Sullivan 43'; Roche 87'	Report	Krassyukova 64'	Stadium: Turners Cross; Referee: Aneliya Sinabova (Bulgaria)

25 October 2009 2011 FIFA Women's World Cup qualification	Russia	3–0	Republic of Ireland	Krasnoarmeysk, Russia
15:00 UTC+3	Morozova 12'; Savchenkova 52'; Petrova 90+1'	Report		Stadium: Krasnoarmeysk Stadium; Referee: Jenny Palmqvist (Sweden)

29 October 2009 2011 FIFA Women's World Cup qualification	Kazakhstan	1–2	Republic of Ireland	Taldykorgan, Kazakhstan
14:00 UTC+6	Yalova 6'	Report	Roche 64'; Tracy 70'	Stadium: Zhetysu Stadium; Referee: Kirsi Heikkinen (Finland)
