= Stephan (given name) =

- Pronunciation: /ˈstɛfən/ STEF-ən or /ˈstiːvən/ STEE-vən
- Gender: Male

Origin
- Word/name: Greek
- Meaning: Crown, wreath

Stephan is a male given name, a variant of Stephen.

== People with the name ==
- Stephan, Prince of Lippe (born 1959), German royal
- Stephan Aarstol, American internet entrepreneur and author
- Stephan Ackermann (born 1963), German Catholic bishop
- Stephan Albani (born 1968), German physicist and politician
- Stephan Kofi Ambrosius (born 1998), German professional footballer
- Stephan Maigaard Andersen (born 1981), Danish professional footballer
- Stephan Andrist (born 1987), Swiss footballer
- Stephan Baard (born 1992), a Namibian cricketer
- Stephan Balint (1943–2007), Hungarian writer, actor, theatre director, and playwright
- Stephan Balliet, a German convicted murderer
- Stephan Beeharry (born 1975), Mauritian badminton player
- Stephan Berwick, American author, martial artist, and actor
- Stephan Bodecker (1384–1459), bishop of Brandenburg and scholar of Hebrew texts
- Stephan Bodzin (born 1969), German DJ techno-producer, performer, and label founder
- Stephan Bonnar (1977–2022), an American professional wrestler, retired mixed martial arts fighter
- Stephan Brandner (born 1966), a German far-right politician
- Stephan Braunfels (born 1950), a German architect
- Stephan Brenninkmeijer (born 1964), Dutch film director, screenwriter, and producer
- Stephan Bunker, American politician
- Stephan Burger (born 1962), a German Roman Catholic archbishop
- Stephan Bürgler (born 1987), Austrian football player
- Stephan Burián von Rajecz (1851–1922), Austro-Hungarian politician, diplomat, and statesman
- Stephan Chase (1945–2019), British actor
- Stephan Cohen (1971–2023), French pocket billiards player
- Stephen Cox, British speculative and mystery fiction writer
- Stephan Dahl (born 1971), British professor of marketing
- Stephan Dabbert (born 1958), German agricultural economist and professor
- Stephan de Wit (born 1992), South African rugby union player
- Stephan Dippenaar (born 1988), South African retired rugby union footballer
- Stephan Dorfmeister (1729–1797), German-Hungarian painter
- Stephan DuCharme (born 1964), American-German international businessman
- Stephan Dupuis, Canadian make-up artist
- Stephan Dweck (born 1960), American humorist, attorney, radio show host, and author
- Stephan Eberharter, an Austrian skier
- Stephan El Shaarawy, Italian footballer who plays for A.C. Milan
- Stephan Elliott (born 1964), Australian film director and screenwriter
- Stephan Embacher (born 2006), Austrian ski jumper
- Stephan Endlicher (1804–1849), Austrian botanist, numismatist and Sinologist
- Stephan R. Epstein, a British economic historian
- Stephan Fogaing, Quebec politician
- Stephan Franck, Franco-American animator, writer, director, and comics creator
- Stephan Groth (born 1971), Danish-Norwegian singer
- Stéphan Guérin-Tillié (born 1972), French actor, director, and screen writer
- Stephan A. Hoeller, American author, scholar, and neo-Gnostic bishop
- Stephan Jäger (born 1989), German golfer
- Stephan Jenkins (born 1964), American musician
- Stephan Kampwirth (born 1967), German actor
- Stephan Kinsella (born 1965), American lawyer and author
- Stephan Klapproth, a Swiss journalist and television presenter
- Stephan Knoll (born 1982), Australian politician
- Stephan Koplowitz (born 1956), director, choreographer, and media artist
- Stephan Koranyi (1956–2021), German philologist, author, lecturer, and an editor
- Stephan Körner, a British philosopher
- Stephan Krawczyk (born 1955), German writer and songwriter
- Stephan Krehl (1864–1924), German composer, teacher, and theoretician
- Stephan Kuttner (1907–1996), German-American author, professor, ancient law expert
- Stephan Lehnstaedt (born 1980), German historian
- Stéphan L'Enflé (born 1982), Mauritian football player
- Stephan Letter (born 1978), German serial killer
- Stephan Moccio, Canadian composer, producer, and recording artist
- Stephan Niklaus, a Swiss decathlete
- Stephan Oetzinger (born 1984), German politician
- Stephan Palla (born 1989), an Austrian-Filipino footballer
- Stephan Pastis, an American cartoonist
- Stephan Remmler, a German musician
- Stephan Reuken (born 1985), German politician
- Stephan Rössner (born 1942), Swedish physician
- Stephan Standfuß (born 1972), German politician
- Stephan Steding, German javelin thrower
- Stephan Steinbrück (born 1975), German politician
- Stephan Steinlein (born 1961), German diplomat
- Stephan Hanna Stephan (1894–1949), a Christian Arab Palenstian writer
- Stephan Steverink, Brazilian swimmer
- Stephan Stiefenhöfer, German canoeist
- Stephan Stompor (1931–1995), German musicologist
- Stephan Stracke, German politician
- Stephan Straub, German footballer
- Stephan Streker, Belgian film director and screenwriter
- Stephan Strothe, German journalist
- Stephan Studer (born 1975), Swiss football referee
- Stephan Sturm (born 1963), German businessman
- Stephan Stückler, Austrian footballer
- Stephan Sunthararaj, child rights activist in Sri Lanka who disappeared
- Stephan Talty (born c. 1960), an American journalist and author
- Stephan Weil, a German politician
- Stephan Alexander Würdtwein (1719–1796), German theologian, auxiliary bishop, and historian

== See also ==
- Steph
- Stefan (given name)
- Stef
- Steff
- Steffl
- Stephanie
- Stephen
- Stephon Marbury
- Steven
