= 2003 Algarve Cup =

International women's football tournament

Tournament details
- Host country: Portugal
- City: various cities in Algarve
- Dates: 14-20 March 2003
- Teams: 12 (from 3 confederations)

Final positions
- Champions: United States (2nd title)
- Runners-up: China
- Third place: Norway
- Fourth place: France

Tournament statistics
- Matches played: 24
- Goals scored: 56 (2.33 per match)
- Top scorer(s): (Sweden) Hanna Ljungberg (4 goals each)

The 2003 Algarve Cup is the tenth edition of the Algarve Cup, an invitational women's football tournament hosted annually by Portugal. It was held from fourteenth to twentieth day of March 2003.

The USA won the tournament defeating China, 2-0, in the final game.

== Format ==
The twelve teams are divided into three groups that played a round-robin group stage, followed by one position play-off match for every team.

With 12 teams participating, the Algarve Cup format has been as follows: Groups A and B, containing the strongest ranked teams, are the only ones in contention to win the title. The group A and B winners contest the final - to win the Algarve Cup. The runners-up play for third place, and those that finish third in the groups play for fifth place. The teams in Group C played for places 7–12. The winner of Group C played the team that finished fourth in Group A or B (whichever has the better record) for seventh place. The Group C runner-up played the team who finishes last in Group A or B (with the worse record) for ninth place. The third and fourth placed teams in Group C played for the eleventh place.

Points awarded in the group stage followed the standard formula of three points for a win, one point for a draw and zero point for a loss. In the case of two teams being tied in a group, their head-to-head result determined their place in the group.

== Participating teams ==
- Canada
- Norway
- Sweden
- United States
- China
- Denmark
- Finland
- France
- Greece
- Republic of Ireland
- Portugal
- Wales

== Group stage ==
=== Group A ===
Team	Pld	W	D	L	GF	GA	GD	Pts
United States	3	1	2	0	3	2	+1	5
Norway	3	1	1	1	2	2	0	4
Sweden	3	0	3	0	3	3	0	3
Canada	3	0	2	1	2	3	−1	2

14 March 2003

United States	1–1	Canada
85' Aly Wagner	Report; Report	7' Andrea Neil

Olhão
14 March 2003

Sweden	1–1	Norway
58' Hanna Ljungberg	SvFF Report (in Swedish)	40' Dagny Mellgren

Olhão
16 March 2003

Sweden	1–1	Canada
85' Hanna Ljungberg	Report; SvFF Report (in Swedish)	80' Sharolta Nonen

Ferreiras
16 March 2003

Norway	0–1	United States
	Report	4' Shannon MacMillan

Ferreiras
18 March 2003

Norway	1–0	Canada
39' Dagny Mellgren	Report

Santo António
18 March 2003

United States	1–1	Sweden
18' Aly Wagner	Report; SvFF Report (in Swedish)	78' Hanna Ljungberg

Santo António

=== Group B ===
Team	Pld	W	D	L	GF	GA	GD	Pts
China	3	2	1	0	5	1	+4	7
France	3	2	0	1	4	3	+1	6
Finland	3	0	2	1	0	1	−1	2
Denmark	3	0	1	2	1	5	−4	1

14 March 2003

Denmark	0–3	France
		14', 53' Marinette Pichon; 85' Élodie Woock

Silves
14 March 2003

China	0–0	Finland

Silves
16 March 2003

Denmark	0–0	Finland

Lagos
16 March 2003

China	3–0	France
15', 66' Sun Wen; 56' Bai Jie

Ferreiras
18 March 2003

France	1–0	Finland
55' Hoda Lattaf

Albufeira
18 March 2003

China	2–1	Denmark
32' Han Duan; 90' Sun Wen		66' Mette Jokumsen

Albufeira

=== Group C ===
Team	Pld	W	D	L	GF	GA	GD	Pts
Greece	3	1	2	0	3	1	+2	5
Portugal	3	1	2	0	5	4	+1	5
Republic of Ireland	3	1	1	1	5	4	+1	4
Wales	3	0	1	2	2	6	−4	1

14 March 2003

Portugal	1–1	Wales
11' Inês Silva	Report	47' Cheryl Foster

Lagoa
14 March 2003

Republic of Ireland	0–0	Greece

Lagoa
16 March 2003

Portugal	1–1	Greece
88' Carla Couto	Report	37' Regina Holan

Guia
16 March 2003

Republic of Ireland	3–1	Wales
17', 81' Olivia O'Toole; 44' Ciara Grant		20' Ayshea Martyn

Guia
18 March 2003

Greece	2–0	Wales
7' Ana Stavroula; 80' Regina Holan

Quarteira
18 March 2003

Portugal	3–2	Republic of Ireland
45' Edite Fernandes; 43' Ana Rita; 71' Carla Monteiro	Report	31' Michele O'Brien; 28' Claire Scanlan

Quarteira

== Placement play-offs ==
=== Eleventh place match ===
20 March 2003

Republic of Ireland	2–2	Wales
77', 83' Claire Scanlan		6' Milly Durrant; 88' Michelle Green
Penalties
	4–2

Montechoro

=== Ninth place match ===
20 March 2003

Denmark	1–0	Portugal
84' (own goal – Sandra Loureiro)	Report

Lagoa

=== Seventh place match ===
20 March 2003

Canada	7–1	Greece
5', 38', 82' Christine Sinclair; 26' Andrea Neil; 41' Kara Lang; 65' Silvana Burtini; 80' Carmelina Moscato	Report	86' Amalia Loseno

Guia

=== Fifth place match ===
20 March 2003

Sweden	5–0	Finland
10' Salina Olsson; 39', 58' Anne-Maria Eriksson; 74' Victoria Svensson; 90' Hanna Ljungberg	SvFF Report (in Swedish)

Olhão

=== Third place match ===
20 March 2003

Norway	1–0	France
11' Dagny Mellgren

Quarteira

=== Final ===
20 March 2003

United States	2–0	China
52' Shannon MacMillan; 56' Mia Hamm	Report

Loulé

2003 Algarve Cup

United States
Second title

== Final standings ==
Rank	Team
1st place, gold medalist(s)	United States
2nd place, silver medalist(s)	China
3rd place, bronze medalist(s)	Norway
4	France
5	Sweden
6	Finland
7	Canada
8	Greece
9	Denmark
10	Portugal
11	Republic of Ireland
12	Wales

== Goal scorers ==
Goals	Player
4	(Sweden) Hanna Ljungberg
3	(Canada) Christine Sinclair
3	(China) Sun Wen
3	(Republic of Ireland) Claire Scanlan
3	(Norway) Dagny Mellgren
2	(Canada) Andrea Neil
2	(Greece) Regina Holan
2	(France) Marinette Pichon
2	(Republic of Ireland) Olivia O'Toole
2	(Sweden) Anne-Maria Eriksson
2	(United States) Aly Wagner
2	(United States) Shannon MacMillan
1	25 athletes / / / (Canada) Carmelina Moscato; (Canada) Kara Lang / (Canada) Sharolta Nonen / (Canada) Silvana Burtini / (China) Bai Jie; (China) Han Duan / (Denmark) Mette Jokumsen / (France) Élodie Woock / (France) Hoda Lattaf; (Greece) Ana Stavroula / (Greece) Amiel Loseno / (Republic of Ireland) Ciara Grant / (Republic of Ireland) Michele O'Brien; (Portugal) Ana Rita Gomes / (Portugal) Edite Fernandes / (Portugal) Inês Silva / (Portugal) Carla Couto; (Portugal) Carla Monteiro / (Sweden) Salina Olsson / (Sweden) Victoria Svensson / (United States) Mia Hamm; (Wales) Ayshea Martyn / (Wales) Cheryl Foster / (Wales) Michelle Green / (Wales) Milly Durrant
1 own goal
