= Republic of Ireland women's national football team results (2020–present) =

The Republic of Ireland women's national football team results for the period 2020 to 2029.

== Match results ==
Win Draw Loss Cancelled

=== 2020 ===
6 March EUROQ-GI	Republic of Ireland	1–0	Greece	Dublin, Ireland
20:15 (19:15 GMT)	Caldwell 45'	Report		Stadium: Tallaght Stadium; Referee: María Dolores Martínez Madrona (Spain)

11 March EUROQ-GI	Montenegro	0–3	Republic of Ireland	Budva, Montenegro
16:00 (15:00 GMT)		Report	Caldwell 12'; McCabe 83'; O'Sullivan 85'	Stadium: Stadion pod Malim Brdom; Attendance: played behind closed doors Referee: Maria Marotta (Italy)

19 September EUROQ-GI	Germany	3–0	Republic of Ireland	Essen, Germany
14:00 (13:00 GMT)	Hegering 8'; Marozsán 38'; Schüller 41'	Report		Stadium: Stadion Essen; Referee: Monika Mularczyk (Poland)

23 October EUROQ-GI	Ukraine	1–0	Republic of Ireland	Kyiv, Ukraine
18:00 (19:00 EEST)	O'Gorman 25' (o.g.)	Report		Stadium: Obolon Arena; Referee: Ivana Martinčić (Croatia)

1 December EUROQ-GI	Republic of Ireland	1–3	Germany	Dublin, Ireland
18:00 (17:00 GMT)	McCabe 45' (pen.)	Report	Magull 21' (pen.); Waßmuth 29', 85'	Stadium: Tallaght Stadium; Referee: Sara Persson (Sweden)

=== 2021 ===
8 April Friendly	Republic of Ireland	0–1	Denmark	Dublin, Ireland
19:30		Report	Sørensen 9'	Stadium: Tallaght Stadium; Referee: Louise Thompson (Northern Ireland)

11 April Friendly	Belgium	1–0	Republic of Ireland	Brussels, Belgium
12:30	De Caigny 14'	Report		Stadium: King Baudouin Stadium; Referee: Lizzy van der Helm (Netherlands)

11 June Friendly	Iceland	3–2	Republic of Ireland	Reykjavík, Iceland
	Albertsdóttir 11'; Jóhannsdóttir 13'; Brynjarsdóttir 39'	Report	Payne 49'; Barrett 90+2'	Stadium: Laugardalsvöllur

15 June Friendly	Iceland	2–0	Republic of Ireland	Reykjavík, Iceland
	Þorvaldsdóttir 54'; Vilhjálmsdóttir 82'	Report		Stadium: Laugardalsvöllur

21 September Friendly	Republic of Ireland	3–2	Australia	Dublin, Ireland
19:00	Lu. Quinn 3'; O'Sullivan 23'; Lo. Quinn 49'	Report	Fowler 14', 45+1'	Stadium: Tallaght Stadium; Referee: Paula Brady (Republic of Ireland)

21 October 2023 FIFA WWC qualifier	Republic of Ireland	0–1	Sweden	Dublin, Ireland
20:00 (19:00 BST)		Report	Lo. Quinn 39' (o.g.)	Stadium: Tallaght Stadium; Referee: Deborah Anex (Switzerland)

26 October 2023 FIFA WWC qualifier	Finland	1–2	Republic of Ireland	Helsinki, Finland
17:15 (18:15 EEST)	Engman 52'	Report	Connolly 10'; D. O'Sullivan 56'	Stadium: Helsinki Olympic Stadium; Referee: Alexandra Collin (France)

25 November 2023 FIFA WWC qualifier	Republic of Ireland	1–1	Slovakia	Dublin, Ireland
	McCabe 65'	Report	Šurnovská 47'	Stadium: Tallaght Stadium; Referee: Jelena Cvetković (Serbia)

30 November 2023 FIFA WWC qualifier	Republic of Ireland	11–0	Georgia	Dublin, Ireland
	Bebia 4' (o.g.); Carusa 21'; Quinn 37'; O'Sullivan 45+4', 58', 62'; McCabe 70' (pen.), 73'; Noonan 82'; Barrett 89'; Caldwell 90+2'	Report		Stadium: Tallaght Stadium; Referee: Jurgita Mačikunytė (Lithuania)

=== 2022 ===
16 February 2022 Pinatar Cup	Republic of Ireland	2–1	Poland	La Manga, Spain
	Quinn 66', 75'		Dudek 49'	Stadium: La Manga Club Football Stadium

19 February 2022 Pinatar Cup	Republic of Ireland	0–1	Russia	La Manga, Spain
			Lazareva 7'	Stadium: La Manga Club Football Stadium

22 February 2022 Pinatar Cup	Wales	0–1	Republic of Ireland	La Manga, Spain
			O'Sullivan 25'	Stadium: La Manga Club Football Stadium

12 April 2023 FIFA WWC qualifier	Sweden	1–1	Republic of Ireland	Gothenburg, Sweden
18:30	Asllani 79'	Report	McCabe 44'	Stadium: Gamla Ullevi; Attendance: 12,123; Referee: Iuliana Demetrescu (Romania)

19 June Friendly	Republic of Ireland	1–0	Philippines	Antalya, Turkey
18:00 UTC+3	Agg 37'	Report		Stadium: Bellis Hotel Sports Center; Referee: Gamze Durmas Pakkan (Turkey)

27 June 2023 FIFA WWC qualifier	Georgia	0–9	Republic of Ireland	Gori, Georgia
		Report	McCabe 8', 45+1', 75'; Fahey 13'; Connolly 18'; Quinn 49', 73'; Larkin 82'; O'Sullivan 90+3'	Stadium: Tengiz Burjanadze Stadium; Referee: Melis Özçiğdem (Turkey)
Note: Following a request from the FAI, the game was rescheduled to be played during the international window in June 2022.

1 September 2023 FIFA WWC qualifier	Republic of Ireland	1–0	Finland	Dublin, Ireland
	Agg 54'	Report		Stadium: Tallaght Stadium; Referee: Stéphanie Frappart (France)

6 September 2023 FIFA WWC qualifier	Slovakia	0–1	Republic of Ireland	Senec, Slovakia
19:00 UTC+1		Report	O'Sullivan 37'	Stadium: NTC Senec; Referee: María Martínez (Spain)

11 October 2023 FIFA WWC– UEFA play-offs	Scotland	0–1	Republic of Ireland	Glasgow, Scotland
		Report	Barrett 71'	Stadium: Hampden Park; Referee: Esther Staubli (Switzerland)

14 November Friendly	Republic of Ireland	4–0	Morocco	Marbella, Spain
17:00	Campbell 2'; McCabe 8' (pen.); Quinn 75'; Carusa 79'	Report		Stadium: Marbella Football Center; Referee: Jason Barcelo (Gibraltar)

=== 2023 ===
22 February Friendly	Republic of Ireland	0–0	China	Algeciras, Spain
14:00 UTC+1				Stadium: Estadio Nuevo Mirador

8 April Friendly	United States	2–0	Republic of Ireland	Austin, United States
19:30 IST	Fox 37'; Horan 80' (pen.)	Report		Stadium: Q2 Stadium; Attendance: 20,593; Referee: Carly Shaw-MacLaren (Canada)

12 April Friendly	United States	1–0	Republic of Ireland	St. Louis, United States
00:30 IST	Cook 43'	Report		Stadium: Citypark; Attendance: 22,294; Referee: Crystal Sobers (Trinidad and Tobago)

22 June Friendly	Republic of Ireland	3–2	Zambia	Dublin, Ireland
	Barrett 49' (pen.), 72'; O'Riordan 63'	Report	Brosnan 17' (o.g.); Kundananji 79'	Stadium: Tallaght Stadium; Attendance: 5,732

6 July Friendly	Republic of Ireland	0–3	France	Dublin, Ireland
		Report	Lakrar 45', 61'; Le Sommer 45+5'	Stadium: Tallaght Stadium

14 July Friendly	Colombia	Abandoned	Republic of Ireland	Brisbane, Australia
				Stadium: Meakin Park; Attendance: 0 (Closed door game)
Note: Pre-World Cup warmup match abandoned after 20 minutes due to "overly physical" play from Colombia that resulted in the hospitalisation of Denise O'Sullivan.

20 July FIFA WC Group	Australia	1–0	Republic of Ireland	Sydney, Australia
20:00 UTC+10	Catley 52' (pen.)	Report		Stadium: Stadium Australia; Attendance: 75,784; Referee: Edina Alves Batista (Brazil)

26 July FIFA WC Group	Canada	2–1	Republic of Ireland	Perth, Australia
20:00 UTC+8	Connolly 45+5' (o.g.); Leon 53'	Report	McCabe 4'	Stadium: Perth Rectangular Stadium; Attendance: 17,065; Referee: Laura Fortunato (Argentina)

31 July FIFA WC Group	Republic of Ireland	0–0	Nigeria	Brisbane, Australia
20:00 UTC+10		Report		Stadium: Lang Park; Attendance: 24,884; Referee: Katia García (Mexico)

23 September 2023–24 UEFA Nations League	Republic of Ireland	3–0	Northern Ireland	Dublin, Ireland
	Lu. Quinn 31'; Carusa 70'; Agg 85'	Report		Stadium: Aviva Stadium; Attendance: 35,944; Referee: Hristiyana Guteva (Bulgaria)

26 September 2023–24 UEFA Nations League	Hungary	0–4	Republic of Ireland	Budapest, Hungary
		Report	Hayes 18'; McCabe 42'; Carusa 49'; D. O'Sullivan 70'	Stadium: Hidegkuti Nándor Stadion; Attendance: 1,513; Referee: Zuzana Valentová (Slovakia)

27 October 2023–24 UEFA Nations League	Republic of Ireland	5–1	Albania	Dublin, Ireland
	McCabe 4', 26', 81'; Carusa 56', 59'	Report	Doçi 7'	Stadium: Tallaght Stadium; Attendance: 5,752; Referee: Lizzy Van Der Helm (Netherlands)

31 October 2023–24 UEFA Nations League	Albania	0–1	Republic of Ireland	Shkodër, Albania
18:00		Report	O'Sullivan 88'	Stadium: Loro Boriçi Stadium; Attendance: 120; Referee: Araksya Saribekyan (Armenia)

1 December 2023–24 UEFA Nations League	Republic of Ireland	1–0	Hungary	Dublin, Ireland
19:30 GMT	Csiszár 65' (o.g.)	Report		Stadium: Tallaght Stadium; Attendance: 6,752; Referee: Shona Shukrula (Netherlands)

5 December 2023–24 UEFA Nations League	Northern Ireland	1–6	Republic of Ireland	Belfast, Northern Ireland
19:00 GMT	Beattie 75'	Report	Lu. Quinn 37'; Payne 39'; Carusa 47'; McCabe 50'; Lo. Quinn 61'; Hayes 86'	Stadium: Windsor Park; Attendance: 9,038; Referee: Veronika Kovarova (Czech Republic)

=== 2024 ===
23 February Friendly	Italy	0–0	Republic of Ireland	Florence, Italy
17:15 GMT		Report		Stadium: Viola Park; Referee: Emanuela Rusta (Albania)

27 February Friendly	Republic of Ireland	0–2	Wales	Dublin, Ireland
19:30 GMT			Fishlock 7'; Woodham 22'	Stadium: Tallaght Stadium; Attendance: 8,218

5 April Euro 2025 qualifying	France	1–0	Republic of Ireland	Metz, France
21:10 CEDT	Geyoro 6'	Report		Stadium: Stade Saint-Symphorien; Referee: Maria Sole Ferrieri Caputi (Italy)

9 April Euro 2025 qualifying	Republic of Ireland	0–2	England	Dublin, Ireland
19:30 IST	James 12'; Greenwood 18' (pen.)	Report		Stadium: Aviva Stadium; Attendance: 32,742; Referee: Lina Lehtovaara (Finland)

31 May Euro 2025 qualifying	Republic of Ireland	0–3	Sweden	Dublin, Ireland
19:30 IST		Report	Rytting Kaneryd 26', 86'; Rolfö 62'	Stadium: Aviva Stadium; Attendance: 22,868; Referee: Katalin Kulcsár (Hungary)

4 June Euro 2025 qualifying	Sweden	1–0	Republic of Ireland	Solna, Sweden
18:30 CEDT	Eriksson 84'	Report		Stadium: Friends Arena; Attendance: 21,216; Referee: Alina Peşu (Romania)

12 July Euro 2025 qualifying	England	2–1	Republic of Ireland	Norwich, England
20:00 BST	Russo 5'; Stanway 57' (pen.)	Report	Russell 90+4'	Stadium: Carrow Road; Attendance: 23,003; Referee: Catarina Campos (Portugal)

16 July Euro 2025 qualifying	Republic of Ireland	3–1	France	Cork, Ireland
18:00 IST	O'Sullivan 67'; Russell 76'; Patten 90'	Report	Becho 79'	Stadium: Páirc Uí Chaoimh; Attendance: 18,399; Referee: Olatz Rivera Olmedo (Spain)

25 October Euro 2025 play-offs	Georgia	0–6	Republic of Ireland	Tbilisi, Georgia
20:00 GET		Report	McCabe 37' (pen.), 67'; Carusa 59'; Stapleton 82'; Sheva 90+7'; Mannion 90+10'	Stadium: M. Meskhi II Stadium; Attendance: 1,440; Referee: Emanuela Rusta (Albania)

29 October Euro 2025 play-offs	Republic of Ireland	3–0 (9–0 agg.)	Georgia	Dublin, Ireland
19:30 GMT	Russell 3'; Carusa 31'; McCabe 55'	Report		Stadium: Tallaght Stadium; Attendance: 8,745; Referee: Katalin Kulcsár (Hungary)

29 November Euro 2025 play-offs	Wales	1–1	Republic of Ireland	Cardiff, Wales
19:15 GMT	Woodham 21'	Report	Clark 35' (o.g.)	Stadium: Cardiff City Stadium; Attendance: 16,485; Referee: Maria Sole Ferrieri Caputi (Italy)

3 December Euro 2025 play-offs	Republic of Ireland	1-2 (2–3 agg.)	Wales	Dublin, Ireland
19:30 GMT	Patten 89'	Report	Cain 50' (pen.); Jones 67'	Stadium: Aviva Stadium; Attendance: 25,832; Referee: Marta Huerta De Aza (Spain)

=== 2025 ===
21 February 2025 UEFA Nations League	Republic of Ireland	1–0	Turkey	Dublin, Ireland
19:30 GMT	Carusa 45+3'	Report		Stadium: Tallaght Stadium; Attendance: 8,071; Referee: Réka Molnar (Hungary)

25 February 2025 UEFA Nations League	Slovenia	4–0	Republic of Ireland	Koper, Slovenia
18:00 CET	Prašnikar 3', 28'; Kramžar 34'; Kajzba 82'	Report		Stadium: Bonifika Stadium; Attendance: 533; Referee: Michalina Diakow (Poland)

4 April 2025 UEFA Nations League	Greece	0–4	Republic of Ireland	Heraklion, Greece
17:00 EEST		Report	Sheva 49'; Carusa 61'; Stapleton 74'; Barrett 90+3'	Stadium: Theodoros Vardinogiannis; Attendance: 550; Referee: Jelena Pejković (Croatia)

8 April 2025 UEFA Nations League	Republic of Ireland	2–1	Greece	Dublin, Ireland
19:30 IST	Barrett 9' (pen.); Patten 50'	Report	Sarri 72'	Stadium: Tallaght Stadium; Attendance: 5,879; Referee: Franziska Wildfeuer (Germany)

30 May 2025 UEFA Nations League	Turkey	1–2	Republic of Ireland	Istanbul, Turkey
20:00 TRT	Hançar 49'	Report	Şeker 80' (o.g.); Murphy 89'	Stadium: Esenler Stadium; Attendance: 760; Referee: Kristina Georgieva (Bulgaria)

3 June 2025 UEFA Nations League	Republic of Ireland	1–0	Slovenia	Cork, Ireland
18:00 IST	Noonan 19'	Report		Stadium: Páirc Uí Chaoimh; Attendance: 9,443; Referee: Miriama Bočková (Slovakia)

26 June Friendly	United States	4–0	Republic of Ireland	Commerce City, United States
19:00 MDT	Patterson 18'; Coffey 45+4'; Lavelle 53'; Thompson 63'	Report		Stadium: Dick's Sporting Goods Park; Attendance: 18,504; Referee: Vimarest Diaz (Dominican Republic)

29 June Friendly	United States	4–0	Republic of Ireland	Cincinnati, United States
15:00 EDT	Biyendolo 11'; Rodriguez 42'; Ryan 66'; A. Thompson 86'	Report		Stadium: TQL Stadium; Attendance: 24,016; Referee: Janeishka Caban (Puerto Rico)

24 October 2025 UEFA Nations League Play-offs	Republic of Ireland	4–2	Belgium	Dublin, Ireland
19:00 IST	McCabe 45' (pen.), 62'; Evrard 54' (o.g.); Sheva 66'	Report	Wullaert 52'; Detruyer 82'	Stadium: Aviva Stadium; Attendance: 14,180; Referee: Franziska Wildfeuer (Germany)

28 October 2025 UEFA Nations League Play-offs	Belgium	2–1 (4–5 agg.)	Republic of Ireland	Leuven, Belgium
20:30 CET	Wullaert 33', 39'	Report	Larkin 90'	Stadium: Den Dreef; Attendance: 7,700; Referee: Stéphanie Frappart (France)

29 November Friendly	Republic of Ireland	3–2	Hungary	Marbella, Spain
12:30 CET	Larkin 8'; Carusa 19'; O'Sullivan 53'	Report	Vincze 27'; Kajet 89'	Stadium: Marbella Football Center; Attendance: 0 (behind closed doors); Referee: Seth Galia (Gibraltar)

=== 2026 ===
3 March 2027 FIFA Women's World Cup Qualifiers	Republic of Ireland	1–2	France	Dublin, Ireland
19:30 GMT	McCabe 12'	Report	Malard 71', 79'	Stadium: Tallaght Stadium; Attendance: 8,376; Referee: Tess Olofsson (Sweden)

7 March 2027 FIFA Women's World Cup Qualifiers	Netherlands	2–1	Republic of Ireland	Utrecht, Netherlands
20:45 CET	Beerensteyn 20', 82'	Report	McCabe 50' (pen.)	Stadium: Stadion Galgenwaard; Attendance: 12,244; Referee: Frida Klarlund (Denmark)

14 April 2027 FIFA Women's World Cup Qualifiers	Poland	2–3	Republic of Ireland	Gdańsk, Poland
18:00 CEST	Pawollek 43'; Pajor 78'	Report	Murphy 12'; McCabe 20'; Sheva 59'	Stadium: Gdańsk Stadium; Attendance: 4,270; Referee: Hristiyana Guteva (Bulgaria)

18 April 2027 FIFA Women's World Cup Qualifiers	Republic of Ireland	1–0	Poland	Dublin, Ireland
15:00 IST	Sheva 42'	Report		Stadium: Aviva Stadium; Attendance: 18,267; Referee: Aleksandra Cesen (Sweden)

5 June 2027 FIFA Women's World Cup Qualifiers	Republic of Ireland	3–2	Netherlands	Cork, Ireland
19:30 IST	Carusa 19'; Larkin 71'; Barrett 90'	Report	Janssen 70' (pen.); Pelova 81'	Stadium: Páirc Uí Chaoimh; Attendance: 12,569; Referee: Katalin Kulcsár (Hungary)

9 June 2027 FIFA Women's World Cup Qualifiers	France	1–0	Republic of Ireland	Grenoble, France
CEST	Malard 40'	Report		Stadium: Stade des Alpes; Attendance: 7,559; Referee: Désirée Blanco (Switzerland)

9 October 2027 FIFA Women's World Cup Qualifiers	Kazakhstan	0–8	Republic of Ireland	Astana, Kazakhstan
16:00 UTC+5		Report	Carusa 7', 28'; Mustaki 16'; Murphy 44'; Larkin 45+3'; Finn 58'; Hopcroft 73'; Stapleton 90'	Stadium: Astana Arena; Attendance: 1,000; Referee: Karoline Marie Jensen (Norway)

13 October 2027 FIFA Women's World Cup Qualifiers	Republic of Ireland	4–0 (12–0 agg.)	Kazakhstan	Cork, Ireland
19:30 IST	Stapleton 40'; McCabe 48'; Quinn 70'; O'Sullivan 73'	Report		Stadium: Páirc Uí Chaoimh; Attendance: 10,334; Referee: Michaela Pachtová (Czech Republic)

== See also ==
- Republic of Ireland women's national football team results (1973–1989)
- Republic of Ireland women's national football team results (1990–1999)
- Republic of Ireland women's national football team results (2000–2009)
- Republic of Ireland women's national football team results (2010–2019)
