= Republic of Ireland women's national football team results (1990–1999) =

This article contains the results of the Republic of Ireland women's national football team between 1990 and 1999. During the 1990s the Republic of Ireland competed in four UEFA Women's Championship qualification campaigns – 1991, 1993, 1997 and 2001. After losing 10–0 to Sweden in a Euro 1993 qualifier, the FAI did not enter a team in the 1995 competition. This defeat against Sweden remains the team's biggest defeat. They also competed in qualifiers for the 1999 FIFA Women's World Cup. On 4 September 1999 they also played an away friendly against the United States.

== Results ==
=== 1990 ===
29 April 1990 UEFA Women's Euro 1991 qualifying	Republic of Ireland	0–0	Netherlands	Dublin, Ireland
		Report		Stadium: Dalymount Park; Referee: Patrick Kelly (Ireland)

7 October 1990 UEFA Women's Euro 1991 qualifying	Republic of Ireland	4–0	Northern Ireland	Dublin, Ireland
	Scanlan 2', 43'; Cross 5'; Williams 45'	Report		Stadium: Belfield Park; Referee: Wilfred Wallace (Ireland)

=== 1991 ===
8 December 1991 UEFA Women's Euro 1993 qualifying	Spain	0–1	Republic of Ireland	Lucena, Spain
		Report	O'Toole 51'	Stadium: Ciudad Deportiva de Lucena; Referee: Philippe Leduc (France)

=== 1992 ===
22 September 1992 UEFA Women's Euro 1993 qualifying	Republic of Ireland	0–1	Spain	Dublin, Ireland
		Report	Bakero 9'	Stadium: Dalymount Park; Referee: Bragi Bergmann

7 June 1992 UEFA Women's Euro 1993 qualifying	Republic of Ireland	0–1	Sweden	Dublin, Ireland
		Report	Curan 83' (o.g.)	Stadium: Dalymount Park; Referee: Stephen Lodge (England)

20 September 1992 UEFA Women's Euro 1993 qualifying	Sweden	10–0	Republic of Ireland	Borås, Sweden
	Kalte 28'; Andersson 30', 67'; Andelén-Andersson 42', 53', 70', 73'; Videkull 51', 64'; Nilsson 80'	Report		Stadium: Ryavallen; Referee: Zygmunt Ziober

=== 1993 ===
17 October 1993 Friendly	Republic of Ireland	2–0	Northern Ireland	Sligo, Ireland
15:00 UTC+1	Leahy; Towler	Report		Stadium: Ray MacSharry Park

=== 1994 ===
5 June 1994 Friendly	Wales	0–2	Republic of Ireland	Pembroke, Wales
			Furlong; Gallagher

9 August 1994 Friendly	Republic of Ireland	1–1	United States B (Note: Team organized by the USASA and not the USSF)	Dublin, Ireland
	Gallagher	Report	Crow 15'	Stadium: Richmond Park

29 October 1994 Friendly	Northern Ireland	0–1	Republic of Ireland	Belfast, Northern Ireland
			Gallagher

12 November 1994 Friendly	Republic of Ireland	0–3	France	Cork, Ireland
		Report	Zenoni 26'; Gout 54'; Pichon 77'	Stadium: Turners Cross

=== 1995 ===
3 September 1995 Friendly	Republic of Ireland	6–0	Northern Ireland	Drogheda, Ireland
15:00 UTC+1	O'Toole 10', 43', 57'; Leahy 67'; McNally 72'; Gallagher 79'	Report		Stadium: United Park

24 September 1995 UEFA Women's Euro 1997 qualifying	Faroe Islands	0–2	Republic of Ireland	Toftir, Faroe Islands
		Report	McNally 39'; O'Toole 84'	Stadium: Svangaskarð; Referee: Andreas Schluchter

8 October 1995 UEFA Women's Euro 1997 qualifying	Wales	0–3	Republic of Ireland	Llanelli, Wales
		Report	O'Shea 12'; Gallagher 61'; Boyle 86'	Stadium: Stebonheath Park; Referee: Gudmundur Stefán Mariasson

28 October 1995 UEFA Women's Euro 1997 qualifying	Republic of Ireland	3–1	Faroe Islands	Dublin, Ireland
	McNally 26', 42'; Gallagher 89'	Report	Rein 39'	Stadium: Dalymount Park; Referee: Jørn West Larsen

5 November 1995 UEFA Women's Euro 1997 qualifying	Republic of Ireland	2–0	Scotland	Dublin, Ireland
	O'Shea 54', 83'	Report		Stadium: Dalymount Park; Referee: Katriina Elovirta

=== 1996 ===
25 February 1996 UEFA Women's Euro 1997 qualifying	Republic of Ireland	5–1	Wales	Dublin, Ireland
	O'Toole 6', 29'; Boyle 41'; O'Shea 44'; Lyons 57'	Report	Merola 70'	Stadium: Dalymount Park; Referee: Ingrid Jonsson

31 March 1996 UEFA Women's Euro 1997 qualifying	Republic of Ireland	0–1	Belgium	Dublin, Ireland
		Report	Saelens 89'	Stadium: Dalymount Park; Referee: Bente Ovedie Skogvang

7 April 1996 UEFA Women's Euro 1997 qualifying	Scotland	2–4	Republic of Ireland	Stirling, Scotland
	MacDonald 81'; Finnie-henderson 83'	Report	O'Shea 21'; O'Toole 33', 47', 53'	Stadium: Forthbank Stadium; Referee: Bente Folsing

4 May 1996 UEFA Women's Euro 1997 qualifying	Belgium	5–1	Republic of Ireland	Waregem, Belgium
	Migom 50'; Maes 67'; Vanherle 82'; Vanslembrouck 87'; Maus 90'	Report	O'Neill 66'	Stadium: Regenboogstadion; Referee: Florence Dorigny

=== 1997 ===
18 May 1997 Friendly	France	2–0	Republic of Ireland	Orry-la-Ville, France
	Zenoni 45'; Diacre 75' (pen.)	Report

6 September 1997 Friendly	Republic of Ireland	6–0	Northern Ireland	Drogheda, Ireland
15:00 UTC+1	Lyons; McNally; O'Shea; Kierans; O'Toole (pen.); Saurin	Report		Stadium: United Park

21 September 1997 1999 FIFA Women's World Cup qualification	Belarus	0–1	Republic of Ireland	Mogilev, Belarus
		Report	Power 55'	Referee: Galina Doneva (Bulgaria)

2 November 1997 1999 FIFA Women's World Cup qualification	Republic of Ireland	0–1	Poland	Dublin, Ireland
		Report	Szondermajer 44'	Stadium: Tolka Park; Referee: Niklas á Liðarenda (Faroe Islands)

7 December 1997 1999 FIFA Women's World Cup qualification	Wales	0–3	Republic of Ireland	Bangor, Wales
		Report	O'Shea 2'; McNally 28', 90'	Stadium: Farrar Road Stadium; Referee: Katriina Elovirta (Finland)

=== 1998 ===
8 March 1998 1999 FIFA Women's World Cup qualification	Republic of Ireland	4–0	Wales	Bray, Ireland
	Reilly 29'; Kierans 57'; Saurin 68', 90'	Report		Stadium: Carlisle Grounds; Referee: Maria Patrascu (Romania)

23 May 1998 Friendly	Sweden	2–1	Republic of Ireland	Hudiksvall, Sweden
14:00 UTC+2	Amcoff	Report	Saurin	Stadium: Glysisvallen

6 June 1998 1999 FIFA Women's World Cup qualification	Poland	3–0	Republic of Ireland	Łuków, Poland
	Nieczypor 10', 57'; Szondermajer 30'	Report		Referee: Algirdas Dubinskas (Lithuania)

27 June 1998 1999 FIFA Women's World Cup qualification	Republic of Ireland	0–0	Belarus	Drogheda, Ireland
		Report		Referee: Andrei Iacovlev

=== 1999 ===
29 May 1999 Friendly	Republic of Ireland	1–1	Northern Ireland	Dublin, Ireland
15:00 UTC+1	O'Shea	Report	Goal	Stadium: Lansdowne Road

12 June 1999 Friendly (Note: Sweden fielded an under-21 team.)	Republic of Ireland	0–1	Sweden	Galway, Ireland
15:00 UTC+1		Report	Goal	Stadium: Terryland Park

4 September 1999 Friendly	United States	5–0	Republic of Ireland	Foxborough, Massachusetts, United States
15:00 UTC−4	Milbrett 25', 59'; Foudy 38'; Fawcett 72'; Lilly 75'	Report		Stadium: Foxboro Stadium; Attendance: 30,564

3 October 1999 UEFA Women's Euro 2001 qualifying	Scotland	3–0	Republic of Ireland	Cumbernauld, Scotland
	Burns 8', 64'; Fleeting 56'	Report		Stadium: Broadwood Stadium; Referee: Tiziana Calamosca (Italy)

17 October 1999 UEFA Women's Euro 2001 qualifying	Czech Republic	1–1	Republic of Ireland	Blšany, Czech Republic
	Došková 13'	Report	O'Shea 87'	Stadium: FK Chmel Blšany; Referee: Iwona Malek-wybraniec (Poland)

30 October 1999 UEFA Women's Euro 2001 qualifying	Republic of Ireland	2–0	Croatia	Dublin, Ireland
	Grant 53'; O'Shea 88'	Report		Stadium: Richmond Park; Referee: Maria Patrascu (Romania)
