= Stef =

Stef is a given name or nickname, and a surname. Notable people and characters with the name include:

== People with the name ==
=== Given name or nickname ===
- Stef Bos (born 1961), Dutch singer
- Stef Blok (born 1964), Dutch politician, Minister for Housing and the Central Government Sector
- Stef Kamil Carlens (born 1970), Belgian singer for Zita Swoon
- Stephen Carpenter (born 1970), American guitarist for Deftones
- Steph Carse (born 1966), French-Canadian pop singer formerly credited as Stef Carse
- Stef Chura (born 1988), American indie rocker
- Stef Clement (born 1982), Dutch road bicycle racer
- Stef Curtis (born 1983), English footballer
- Stef Doedée (born 1987), Dutch football goalkeeper
- Stef Driesen (born 1966), Belgian artist
- Stef Dusseldorp (born 1989), Dutch racing driver
- Stef Nijland (born 1988), Dutch footballer
- Stef Peeters (born 1992), Belgian footballer
- Stef Penney (born 1969), Scottish novelist and short-film director
- Stef Wertheimer (1926–2025), Israeli entrepreneur, industrialist and politician
- Stef Wijlaars (born 1988), Dutch footballer
- Stef Wils (born 1982), Belgian footballer

=== Surname ===
- Claudia Ștef (born 1978), Romanian race walker

== Fictional characters ==
- Stef Adams Foster, a main character in the American TV series The Fosters, played by Teri Polo
- Stef Djordjevic, protagonist of the film All the Right Moves (1983), played by Tom Cruise
- Stephanie "Stef" Steinbrenner, a protagonist in the film The Goonies, played by Martha Plimpton

== See also ==
- Steff
- Steffl
- Stephan (given name)
- Stephanie
