= Rössner =

Rössner or Rößner may refer to:

- Alfred Rössner (1911–2005), Austrian cross-country skier
- Stephan Rössner (born 1942), Swedish physician and dietician
- Tabea Rößner (born 1966), German politician

== See also ==
- Rossner
