= Roessner =

Roessner is a surname. Notable people with the surname include:

- Michaela Roessner (born 1950), American science-fiction writer
- Stephen Roessner (born 1981), American recording engineer, musician, multi-instrumentalist, and producer
- Ute Roessner (born 1971), German-Australian plant biochemist

== See also ==
- Roessler
- Rossner
