= Kara Lang =

Canadian soccer player (born 1986)

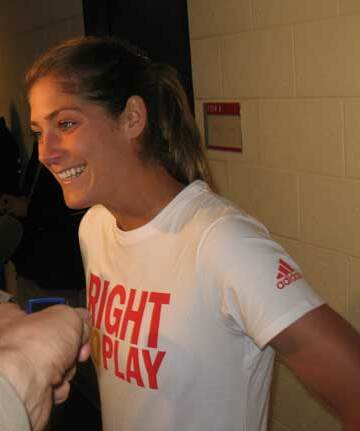
- Lang in 2009

Personal information
- Full name: Kara Elise Lang Romero
- Birth name: Kara Elise Lang
- Date of birth: 22 October 1986 (age 40)
- Place of birth: Calgary, Alberta, Canada
- Height: 5 ft 10 in (1.78 m)
- Position: Forward

College career
Years	Team	Apps	(Gls)
2005–2008	UCLA		

Senior career*
Years	Team	Apps	(Gls)
2003–2006	Vancouver Whitecaps FC	22	(13)
2009	Pali Blues	3	(1)
2010	Vancouver Whitecaps FC	8	(1)

International career^{‡}
2002	Canada U-19		
2002–2011	Canada	92	(34)
- * Club domestic league appearances and goals as of 11 April 2013 (UTC) ‡ National team caps and goals as of 11 April 2013 (UTC)

Kara Elise Lang Romero (born 22 October 1986) is a former Canadian soccer player and current sports analyst, who represented her country in two FIFA World Cups and the Olympic Games, and played club soccer for Vancouver Whitecaps Women. She is the youngest woman to be named to Canada National Women's Team, making her National Team debut on 1 March 2002 at the Algarve Cup in Portugal at age 15. Lang retired on 5 January 2011 at the age of 24 due to recurring knee and ACL injuries. Lang began a comeback in 2013, with her ambition being to help Canada in the 2015 FIFA Women's World Cup, but suffered a third ACL injury in February 2014, effectively ending her comeback.

She now has two sons and a daughter with retired professional baseball pitcher Ricky Romero.

She was inducted into the Canadian Soccer Hall of Fame as a player in November 2015.

== Personal life ==
As of 2026, Lang is married to former baseball player Ricky Romero. The couple are parents to two sons and a daughter.

=== Early life ===
Lang was born on 22 October 1986 in Calgary, Alberta and raised in Oakville, Ontario. Her mother is originally from Manchester, England.

=== Ethics ===
Lang transitioned to vegetarianism as a teenager and, inspired and mentored by national teammate Amy Walsh, became vegan by the time Amy returned to the Canada squad.

== Career ==
=== College career ===
Lang was ranked as the #1 recruit in the 2005 recruiting class, and chose UCLA. Lang was named as a preseason All-American, which is a notable achievement for a freshman. The UCLA Bruins, under head coach Jill Ellis, compiled an overall record of 22–2–2 in the 2005–2006 season, was ranked 4th nationally, and won the Pac-10 title on the strength of excellent team defence.

Lang started her college career with a splash, scoring a hat-trick in her second game. In the 2005 NCAA tournament, she scored eight goals in six games. Lang's UCLA Bruins met the University of Portland in the NCAA final, where she came up against one of her international teammates, Christine Sinclair; Portland won the title with a 4–0 win. She finished her first year at UCLA with 17 goals and six assists in 24 games, finishing second in team scoring behind Danesha Adams.

Lang took a medical redshirt in the 2006 season after tearing an ACL during the offseason, and will have three more years of athletic eligibility at UCLA.

2007; played in 17 matches starting 16. Honorable Mention All-Pac-10 selection. Scored both goals in a 2–1 overtime victory over Portland on 28 September, her first college match since the 2005 NCAA Final (missed the entire 2006 season with an ACL injury). Ended the season with 17 points on seven goals and three assists. Tallied the game-winning goal in a 2–0 victory over Washington State on 9 November. Scored the Bruins' second goal in a 3–2 double-overtime victory over Portland in the NCAA Quarterfinals. Honorable Mention All-Pac-10 Academic selection.

2008; played in 24 matches, starting in 23, scoring five goals and assisting on nine. Helped UCLA to an unbeaten season of 18–0–2 (9–0 in conference play). Earned second-team ESPN The Magazine Academic All-District VIII honours. Scored a goal and 2 assists in the 1st round of the College Cup. Lost 1–0 in the semi-finals to UNC.

== International career ==
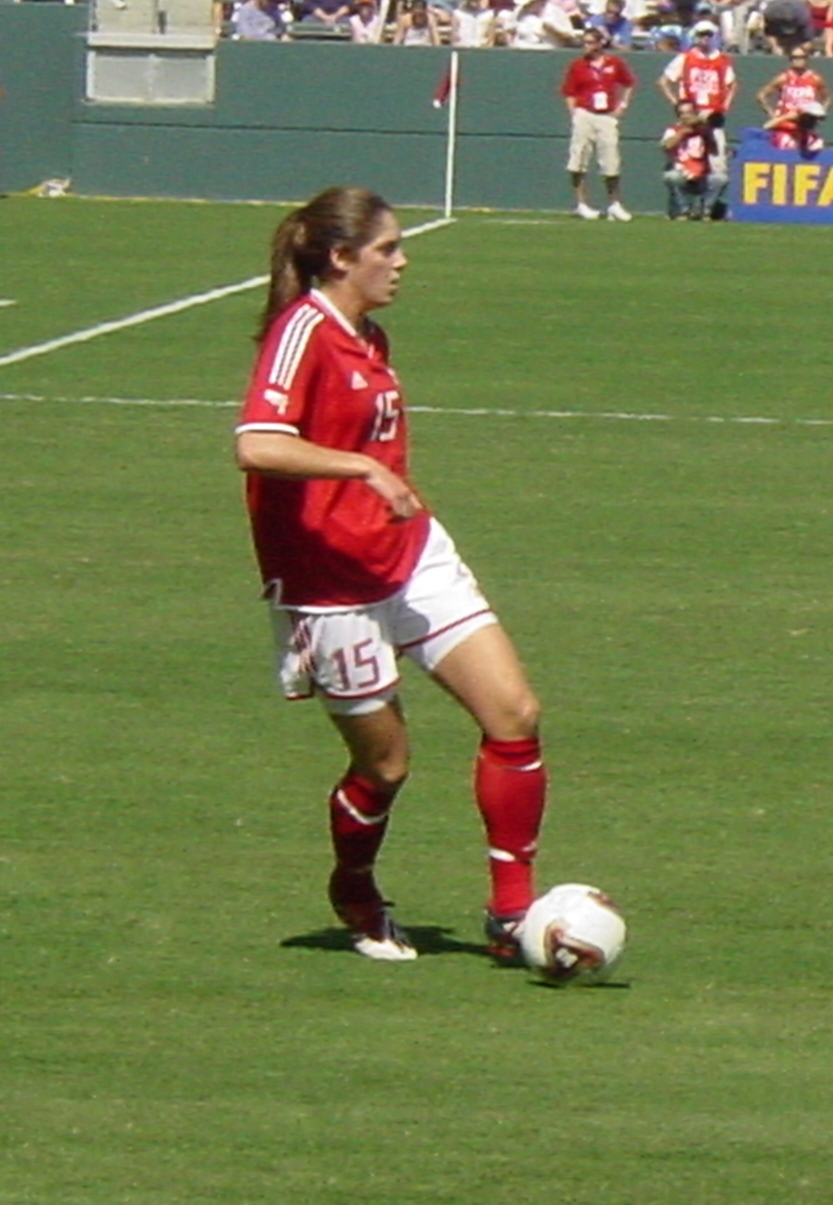
Kara Lang in the Canada-USA match at the 2003 World Cup

Lang is one of the youngest players to score a full international goal. She scored against Wales at the Algarve Cup on 3 March 2002 at age 15 years, 132 days. Her senior debut, two days earlier, was a Canadian record for youngest senior women's cap.

At the 2002 FIFA U-19 World Championships, held in Edmonton, Alberta, as a 15-year-old, Lang scored three goals in six games and added a crucial penalty-kick goal under intense pressure in the semi-finals against Brazil. Canada lost in the final against their rivals in the United States.

At the age of 16, Lang played in all six of Canada's games at the FIFA Women's World Cup 2003. Lang scored two goals in the World Cup (a tally each against Japan in the group stage, and against Sweden in the semi-finals). Lang's memorable free-kick goal in the semi-finals came in the 64th minute to give Canada a 1–0 lead against Sweden, but they would lose the game 2–1 and eventually finish in 4th place at the event.

Lang was an integral part of the 2004 CONCACAF U-19 Qualifying tournament in Ottawa, Ontario, where she played as a central defender at the request of head coach Ian Bridge. Lang proved to be a dominant force in defence paired with Emily Zurrer, and Canada captured the tournament title with a 2–1 extra-time victory over the United States. Despite high hopes, Canada lost in the quarterfinals against China in the 2004 U-19 World Championships in Thailand after being down a player for almost the entire game.

In the 2006 CONCACAF U-20 Qualifying tournament, Lang set a record for fastest goal (four seconds) when she scored from the opening kickoff against Mexico on 22 January 2006. Lang participated in the FIFA Women's World Cup 2007 in China.

On 6 August 2008, Lang scored the winning goal for Canada in a 2–1 victory over Argentina at the 2008 Beijing Olympics. Canada lost in the quarter-finals to United States.

Lang scored one goal in Canada's thrashing of Guyana for 8–0 during the 2010 CONCACAF Women's World Cup qualifying tournament. She went on, along with her teammates, to win the tournament v Mexico in the final (1–0) on 8 November 2010. Unfortunately, this was her last appearance playing soccer, as recurring ACL and knee injuries, forced her to retire. She made the official announcement at an Oakville Soccer Club Press Conference on 5 January 2011, in front of young fans, coaches, soccer club affiliates, and press. "I have gotten everything out of this sport, and I have given this sport all that I have," she said about her retirement. Teammates Diana Matheson, Robyn Gayle, Carmelina Moscato and Melanie Booth also noted that Lang was one of the most 'enthusiastic, hilarious, courteous and spontaneous people' that they ever knew, and were proud not only to have called her a teammate, but one of their best and lifelong friends.

== International goals ==
No.	Date	Venue	Opponent	Score	Result	Competition
1.	3 March 2002	Lagoa, Portugal	Wales	2–0	4–0	2002 Algarve Cup
2.	3 March 2002	Lagoa, Portugal	Wales	4–0	4–0	2002 Algarve Cup
3.	5 March 2002	Silves, Portugal	Portugal	4–0	7–1	2002 Algarve Cup
4.	5 March 2002	Silves, Portugal	Portugal	6–0	7–1	2002 Algarve Cup
5.	6 April 2002	Limoges, France	France	1–0	2–0	Friendly
6.	9 April 2002	Limoges, France	Japan	1–?	2–3	Friendly
7.	1 November 2002	Victoria, Canada	Jamaica	4–0	9–0	2002 CONCACAF Women's Gold Cup
8.	1 November 2002	Victoria, Canada	Jamaica	6–0	9–0	2002 CONCACAF Women's Gold Cup
9.	1 November 2002	Victoria, Canada	Jamaica	8–0	9–0	2002 CONCACAF Women's Gold Cup
10.	1 November 2002	Victoria, Canada	Jamaica	9–0	9–0	2002 CONCACAF Women's Gold Cup
11.	20 March 2003	Guia, Portugal	Greece	4–0	7–1	2003 Algarve Cup
12.	19 May 2003	Lachine, Canada	England	3–0	4–0	Friendly
13.	19 May 2003	Lachine, Canada	England	4–0	4–0	Friendly
14.	22 May 2003	Ottawa, Canada	England	4–0	4–0	Friendly
15.	20 July 2003	Ottawa, Canada	Brazil	1–?	2–1	Friendly
16.	31 August 2003	Edmonton, Canada	Mexico	1–0	8–0	Friendly
17.	9 September 2003	Burnaby, Canada	Mexico	1–0	6–0	Friendly
18.	9 September 2003	Burnaby, Canada	Mexico	2–0	6–0	Friendly
19.	9 September 2003	Burnaby, Canada	Mexico	4–0	6–0	Friendly
20.	27 September 2003	Foxborough, United States	Japan	3–1	3–1	2003 FIFA Women's World Cup
21.	5 October 2003	Portland, United States	Sweden	1–0	1–2	2003 FIFA Women's World Cup
22.	1 September 2004	Burnaby, Canada	Germany	1–?	1–3	Friendly
23.	4 September 2004	Edmonton, Canada	Germany	2–?	4–3	Friendly
24.	16 July 2007	Rio de Janeiro, Brazil	Ecuador	2–0	4–0	2007 Pan American Games
25.	16 July 2007	Rio de Janeiro, Brazil	Ecuador	3–0	4–0	2007 Pan American Games
26.	16 July 2007	Rio de Janeiro, Brazil	Ecuador	4–0	4–0	2007 Pan American Games
27.	18 July 2007	Rio de Janeiro, Brazil	Jamaica	8–0	11–1	2007 Pan American Games
28.	5 March 2008	Paralimni, Cyprus	Russia	2–1	2–1	2008 Cyprus Women's Cup
29.	2 April 2008	Ciudad Juárez, Mexico	Trinidad and Tobago	3–0	6–0	2008 CONCACAF Women's Olympic Qualifying Tournament
30.	16 June 2008	Suwon, South Korea	South Korea	1–0	3–1	2008 Peace Queen Cup
31.	18 June 2008	Suwon, South Korea	New Zealand	2–0	2–0	2008 Peace Queen Cup
32.	6 August 2008	Tianjin, China	Argentina	2–0	2–1	2008 Summer Olympics
34.	31 October 2010	Cancún, Mexico	Guyana	8–0	8–0	2010 CONCACAF Women's World Cup Qualifying

== Broadcasting career ==
In 2011, Lang transitioned to the broadcast booth as a television sports analyst for Rogers Sportsnet covering the 2011 FIFA Women's World Cup. Lang continued working for Sportsnet after the World Cup.

Staying with Rogers, beginning in August 2012, Lang joined the team of the new nightly show Soccer Central on Sportsnet World in Canada. The show was broadcast as Fox Soccer News in the USA. She left the show in early 2013 to pursue her comeback to the National team and a few months later it was cancelled. In 2014 Lang joined the MLS on TSN broadcast team covering the Montreal Impact and Toronto FC as a sideline reporter. In 2015, she was also an analyst for TSN's coverage of the FIFA Women's World Cup. In 2026, she joined the Fox Sports Radio show "Soccer In 60".

== Statistics ==
National team statistics

Team	Caps	Goals
Women's Senior Team	92	34
Women's U-20 Team	33	12

Major tournament statistics

Year	Tournament	Games	Goals	Place
2002	CONCACAF Women's Gold Cup	5	4	Runners-up
2002	FIFA Women's U-19 World Championships	6	3	Runners-up
2003	FIFA Women's World Cup	6	2	4th place
2004	CONCACAF Women's Olympic Qualifying	5	0	3rd place (DNQ)
2004	CONCACAF Women's U-19 Qualifying	5	2	Winners
2004	FIFA Women's U-19 World Championships	4	1	Quarter-finalists
2006	CONCACAF Women's U-19 Qualifying	3	1	Runners-up
2007	FIFA Women's World Cup	3	0	3rd in group
2008	Olympic Games	4	1	Quarter-finalists
2010	Cyprus Women's Cup	0	0	Winners
2010	CONCACAF Women's Cup	1	1	Winners

Club and college statistics

			Season Totals
Season	Team	League	GP	G	A	Pts	Min	Shots	SOG
2003	Vancouver Whitecaps	W-League	4	2	2	6	265	–	–
2004	Vancouver Whitecaps	W-League	5	3	2	8	285	–	–
2005	Vancouver Whitecaps	W-League	10	4	3	11	783	39	–
2005	UCLA Bruins	NCAA	24	17	6	40	–	101	41
2007	UCLA Bruins	NCAA	17	7	3	17	–	50	19
2008	UCLA Bruins	NCAA	24	5	9	19	1711	90	35
2009	Pali Blues	W-League	3	1
2010	Vancouver Whitecaps	W-League	8	1	1	3	332	9
