= Steff =

Steff is a given name which can be male or female or a shortened form of Stephan or Stephanie. Notable people with the name include:

- Steff Fontaine
- Steff Frost

== See also ==
- Stef
- Steffl
