= Steglitz-Zehlendorf 7 =

State electoral district of Germany

- Electoral district for the Berlin House of Representatives
- Steglitz-Zehlendorf 7 in 2026
- District: Steglitz-Zehlendorf
- Electorate: 29,929 (2026)

Current electoral district
- Party: CDU
- Member: Stephan Standfuß

Steglitz-Zehlendorf 7 is an electoral constituency (German: Wahlkreis) represented in the House of Representatives of Berlin. It elects one member via first-past-the-post voting.

== Geography ==
The constituency comprises the areas of Potsdamer Chaussee, Mexikoplatz, Spanische Allee, Königstraße, Wilhelmplatz, Kohlhasenbrück and Steinstücken in the district of Zehlendorf; as well as the districts of Nikolassee, Schlachtensee, and Wansee; entirely within the borough of Steglitz-Zehlendorf.

There were 29,929 eligible voters in 2026.

== Members ==
Election	Member	Party	%
1999	Michael Braun	CDU	55.0
2001	Michael Braun	CDU	36.3
2006	Michael Braun	CDU	39.9
2011	Michael Braun	CDU	44.4
2016	Stephan Standfuß	CDU	30.9
2021	Stephan Standfuß	CDU	30.7
2023	Stephan Standfuß	CDU	40.1
2026	Stephan Standfuß	CDU	38.2

== Election results ==
=== 2026 election ===
State election (2026): Steglitz-Zehlendorf 1
Notes:	Blue background denotes the winner of the electorate vote. Pink background denotes a candidate elected from their party list. Yellow background denotes an electorate win by a list member, or other incumbent. A ✓ or ✗ denotes status of any incumbent, win or lose respectively.						
Party	Candidate	Votes	%	±%	Party votes	%	±%
CDU	✓ Stephan Standfuß	9,459	38.2	▼1.9	9,216	37.1	▼1.3
Greens	Silke Lambeck	5,150	20.8	▲1.0	4,337	17.4	▼0.7
SPD	Norbert Buchta	3,413	13.8	▼4.7	3,510	14.1	▼4.6
AfD	Volker Graffstädt	2,256	9.1	▲4.7	2,345	9.4	▲4.6
Left	Bettina Günter	2,167	8.8	▲5.7	2,644	10.6	▲6.6
FDP	Hanns-Henning Krumrey	1,271	5.1	▼5.1	1,284	5.2	▼5.5
Volt	Ludwig von Jagow	585	2.4		583	2.3	▲1.3
BSW	Saskia Moser	437	1.8		435	1.7	
Tierschutzpartei					202	1.2	▼0.3
PARTEI					102	0.4	▼0.1
PdF					49	0.2	
ÖDP					31	0.1	Steady
DKP					18	0.1	Steady
du.					10	0.0	Steady
SGP					4	0.0	Steady
Informal votes		311			189		
Total valid votes		24,738			24,860		
Turnout		25,049	83.7	▲6.9			
CDU hold	Majority	4,309	17.4	▼2.8			

=== 2023 repeat election ===
Changes denoted below for the 2023 election are compared to the 2016 election, as the 2021 election was declared invalid.

State election (2023): Steglitz-Zehlendorf 7
Notes:	Blue background denotes the winner of the electorate vote. Pink background denotes a candidate elected from their party list. Yellow background denotes an electorate win by a list member, or other incumbent. A ✓ or ✗ denotes status of any incumbent, win or lose respectively.						
Party	Candidate	Votes	%	±%	Party votes	%	±%
CDU	✓ Stephan Standfuß	9,003	40.1	▲9.2	8,626	38.4	▲11.3
Greens	Susanne Mertens	4,458	19.9	▲2.8	4,078	18.1	▲1.3
SPD	Andreas Linde	4,161	18.5	▼4.9	4,204	18.7	▼0.4
FDP	Sebastian Czaja	2,297	10.2	▼2.2	2,409	10.7	▼5.8
AfD	Beate Carmen Prömm	994	4.4	▼5.6	1,077	4.8	▼5.4
Left	Gerald Bader	698	3.1	▼1.6	915	4.1	▼1.6
Tierschutzpartei	Belde Belina Therese Lipp-Holstein	420	1.9		329	1.5	▲0.1
Volt					238	1.1	
PARTEI	Erik Westmann	176	0.8		122	0.5	▼0.4
dieBasis	Rainer Dörfert	163	0.7		135	0.6	
The Grays					43	0.2	
Pirates					42	0.2	▼0.7
Team Todenhöfer					31	0.1	
Gray Panthers					29	0.1	▼0.3
ÖDP					28	0.1	
Humanists					28	0.1	
Klimaliste					27	0.1	
FW	Klaus-Peter von Lüdeke	77	0.3		24	0.1	
Mieterpartei					19	0.1	
Verjüngungsforschung					19	0.1	▼0.1
Bildet Berlin!					13	0.1	
The Pinks/Alliance 21					13	0.1	
du.					10	0.0	
DKP					10	0.0	Steady
Bergpartei, die ÜberPartei					8	0.0	
SGP					4	0.0	Steady
LKR					3	0.0	▼0.4
NPD					1	0.0	▼0.1
BüSo					0	0.0	Steady
Informal votes		22,447			22,485		
Total valid votes		112			78		
Turnout		22,583	76.8	▼3.2			
CDU hold	Majority	4,545	20.2				

=== 2021 election (annulled) ===
The election in 2021 was annulled and rerun in 2023.

State election (2021): Steglitz-Zehlendorf 7
Notes:	Blue background denotes the winner of the electorate vote. Pink background denotes a candidate elected from their party list. Yellow background denotes an electorate win by a list member, or other incumbent. A ✓ or ✗ denotes status of any incumbent, win or lose respectively.						
Party	Candidate	Votes	%	±%	Party votes	%	±%
CDU	✓ Stephan Standfuß	7,787	30.7	▼0.2	7,345	28.9	▲1.8
Greens	Susanne Mertens	5,650	22.3	▲5.2	5,059	19.9	▲3.1
SPD	Andreas Linde	5,100	20.1	▼3.3	5,134	20.2	▲1.1
FDP	Sebastian Czaja	3,584	14.1	▲1.7	3,578	14.1	▼2.4
AfD	Beate Carmen Prömm	992	3.9	▼6.1	1,079	4.2	▼5.9
Left	Gerald Bader	850	3.3	▼1.3	1,192	4.7	▼1.0
Volt					388	1.5	
Tierschutzpartei	Belde Belina Therese Lipp-Holstein	471	1.9		333	1.3	▼0.1
dieBasis	Rainer Dörfert	382	1.5		326	1.3	
PARTEI	Erik Westmann	323	1.3		241	0.9	▲0.1
FW	Klaus-Peter von Lüdeke	240	0.9		180	0.7	
Klimaliste					81	0.3	
Pirates					61	0.2	▼0.6
Team Todenhöfer					61	0.2	
Gray Panthers					57	0.2	▼0.2
The Grays					56	0.2	
APT					54	0.2	
Humanists					44	0.2	
ÖDP					36	0.1	
Verjüngungsforschung					36	0.1	▼0.1
Bildet Berlin!					23	0.1	
du.					23	0.1	
Mieterpartei					22	0.1	
Bergpartei, die ÜberPartei					13	0.1	
LKR					8	0.0	▼0.4
DKP					6	0.0	Steady
NPD					6	0.0	▼0.1
The Pinks/Alliance 21					4	0.0	
BüSo					2	0.0	Steady
SGP					1	0.0	Steady
Informal votes		205			134		
Total valid votes		25,379			25,449		
Turnout		25,619	86.2	▲6.3			
CDU hold	Majority	2,137	8.4				

== See also ==
- Politics of Berlin
- House of Representatives of Berlin
