= Ana Rita =

Portuguese footballer (born 1976)

Personal information
- Full name: Ana Rita Andrade Gomes
- Date of birth: 8 August 1976 (age 50)
- Place of birth: Lisbon, Portugal
- Height: 1.69 m (5 ft 7 in)
- Position: Defender

Senior career*
| Years | Team | Apps | (Gls) |
| 1990–1992 | Carcavelos | | |
| 1992–1994 | Trajouce | | |
| 1994–2004 | 1º Dezembro | | |
| 2004–2006 | Vitória Setúbal | | |
| 2006–2007 | Sporting de Huelva | | |
| 2007–2009 | ÍR | 40 | (10) |
| 2010 | FH | 17 | (1) |
| 2011 | ÍR | 3 | (0) |

International career^{‡}
| 1996–2008 | Portugal | 90 | (5) |
- * Club domestic league appearances and goals ‡ National team caps and goals as of 27 September 2008

Ana Rita Andrade Gomes (born 8 August 1976), known as Ana Rita, is a Portuguese former footballer who played as a defender. She has been a member of the Portugal women's national team. Unusually for an elite footballer, Ana Rita is deaf.

== International goals ==
Scores and results list Portugal's goal tally first

| Date | Venue | Opponent | Score | Result | Competition | Ref. |
|---|---|---|---|---|---|---|
| 4 April 1998 | King Baudouin Stadium, Brussels, Belgium | Belgium | 1–0 | 2–0 | 1999 FIFA Women's World Cup qualification (UEFA) | |
| 23 January 2002 | Complexo Desportivo Bonito, Entroncamento, Portugal | Russia | 1–1 | 1–2 | 2002 International Tournament of Vale do Tejo | |
| 18 March 2003 | Estádio Municipal, Quarteira, Portugal | Republic of Ireland | 1–2 | 3–2 | 2003 Algarve Cup | |
