= Emma Jones (footballer, born 1982) =

Welsh footballer

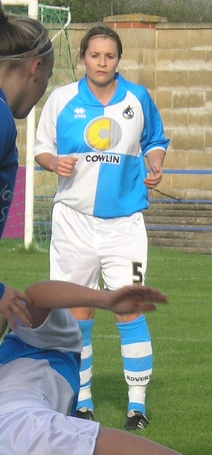
- Emma Jones in 2006

Personal information
- Full name: Emma Louise Jones
- Date of birth: 21 August 1982 (age 44)
- Place of birth: Griffithstown, Wales
- Position: Defender

Team information
- Current team: Cardiff City

Senior career*
Years	Team	Apps	(Gls)
- Newport Strikers
- Newport County
- Merthyr Tydfil
2003–2011	Bristol Academy		
2011	Liverpool Ladies	6	(0)
2012–2023	Cardiff City		

International career
2000–2019	Wales	103	(4)
- * Club domestic league appearances and goals

Emma Louise Jones (born 21 August 1982) is a former footballer who played as a central defender. She accumulated a century of caps for Wales.

== Club career ==
Jones played for Newport Strikers, Newport County and Merthyr Tydfil prior to joining Bristol Rovers in 2003. The club changed its name to Bristol Academy two years later. Her nickname at the Gas Girls was "Vinnie".

In the mid–season break of the 2011 FA WSL, Jones left Bristol to sign for Liverpool.

In February 2012 Jones returned to Wales, signing for Cardiff City's affiliated women's team, who play in the South Wales League.

== International career ==
Jones won six caps for Wales at U16 level and scored three goals in 15 games for the U18 team. She made her senior debut, aged 17, in a 6–0 defeat to Belgium in March 2000.
