= Stéphan L'Enflé =

Mauritian footballer

Personal information
- Full name: Stéphan L'Enflé
- Date of birth: November 7, 1982 (age 43)
- Place of birth: Mauritius
- Position: Defender

Team information
- Current team: SS Capricorne

Senior career*
Years	Team	Apps	(Gls)
2001–2008	AS Port-Louis 2000		
2008–2009	Curepipe Starlight SC		
2009–	SS Capricorne		

International career
2003–	Mauritius	35	(0)
- * Club domestic league appearances and goals

Stéphan L'Enflé (born November 7, 1982, in Mauritius) is a football player who currently plays for SS Capricorne in the Réunion Division 2. He has also represented Mauritius internationally with the Mauritius national football team. He is featured on the Mauritian national team in the official 2010 FIFA World Cup video game.
