= Kerrie Manley =

Welsh footballer (born 1982)

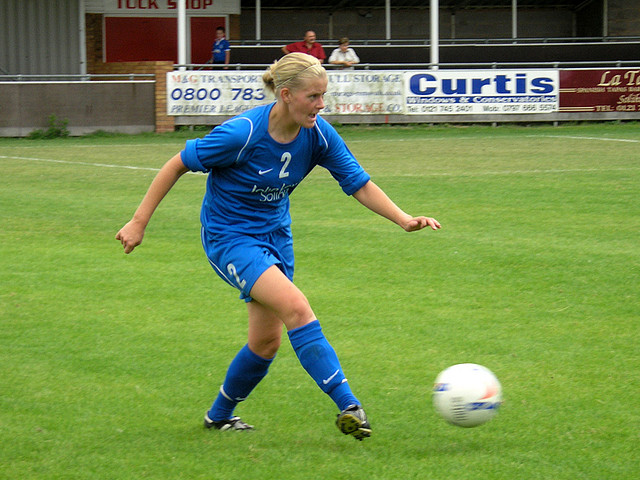
- Manley playing for Birmingham City in September 2006

Personal information
- Full name: Kerrie Elizabeth Manley
- Date of birth: 15 January 1982 (age 44)
- Place of birth: Shrewsbury, England
- Position: Defender

Youth career
- Shrewsbury Town

Senior career*
Years	Team	Apps	(Gls)
–2006	Wolves Women		
2006	Birmingham City		
2006–2009	Bristol Academy		
2009	Birmingham City		
2010	Aston Villa		
2010–2011	Nottingham Forest		
2011–2012	Coventry City		

International career^{‡}
2006–	Wales	32	(3)
- * Club domestic league appearances and goals ‡ National team caps and goals as of 22 April 2011

Kerrie Elizabeth Manley (born 15 January 1982) is a former footballer from Shrewsbury who played for the Welsh national team and Coventry City. Manley played predominantly as a centre back and accumulated over 30 caps for Wales.

== Club career ==
Manley joined Birmingham City from Wolves Women in 2006, but suffered a facial injury on her first start for the Blues. She moved on to Bristol Academy during that season and remained there until 2009. She damaged cruciate ligaments in 2007 and again in January 2009.

After recovering, Manley began 2009–10 back at Birmingham City, then moved to Aston Villa during the campaign. She joined Nottingham Forest in November 2010, making a debut at Millwall Lionesses. Nomadic Manley joined Coventry City ahead of season 2011–12.

== International career ==
Manley was eligible for the Wales women's national football team through her Welsh grandfather. She made her international debut, aged 24, in a 3–2 friendly defeat in Switzerland on 15 March 2006.

As a student at Manchester Metropolitan University Manley represented Great Britain in the 2007 Universiade in Bangkok.
