= Stephan Oetzinger =

German politician (born 1984)

- Oetzinger in 2022

Member of the Landtag of Bavaria
- Incumbent
- Assumed office 5 November 2018
- Preceded by: Petra Dettenhöfer
- Constituency: Weiden in der Oberpfalz

Personal details
- Born: 19 August 1984 (age 42)
- Party: Christian Social Union

Stephan Oetzinger (born 19 August 1984) is a German politician serving as a member of the Landtag of Bavaria since 2018. He has served as chairman of the Christian Social Union in Neustadt an der Waldnaab since 2017. From 2012 to 2018, he served as mayor of Mantel.
