= Rossner =

Surname

Rossner or Roßner is a surname. Notable people with the surname include

- Erich Rossner, Unterscharführer, in the Waffen SS during World War II who was awarded the Knight's Cross of the Iron Cross
- Judith Rossner (1935–2005), American novelist
- Petra Rossner (born 1966), German cyclist

== See also ==
- August (Rossner novel), novel written by Judith Rossner focused on a psychoanalyst and one of her analysands
- Rössner
