= Stephan Standfuß =

German politician (born 1972)

Member of the Abgeordnetenhaus of Berlin
- Incumbent
- Assumed office 27 October 2016
- Preceded by: Michael Braun
- Constituency: Steglitz-Zehlendorf 7

Personal details
- Born: 3 March 1972 (age 54) Berlin
- Party: Christian Democratic Union (since 1993)

Stephan Standfuß (born 3 March 1972 in Berlin) is a German politician serving as a member of the Abgeordnetenhaus of Berlin since 2016. He has served as deputy group leader of the Christian Democratic Union since 2018.
