= Olivia O'Toole =

Irish footballer

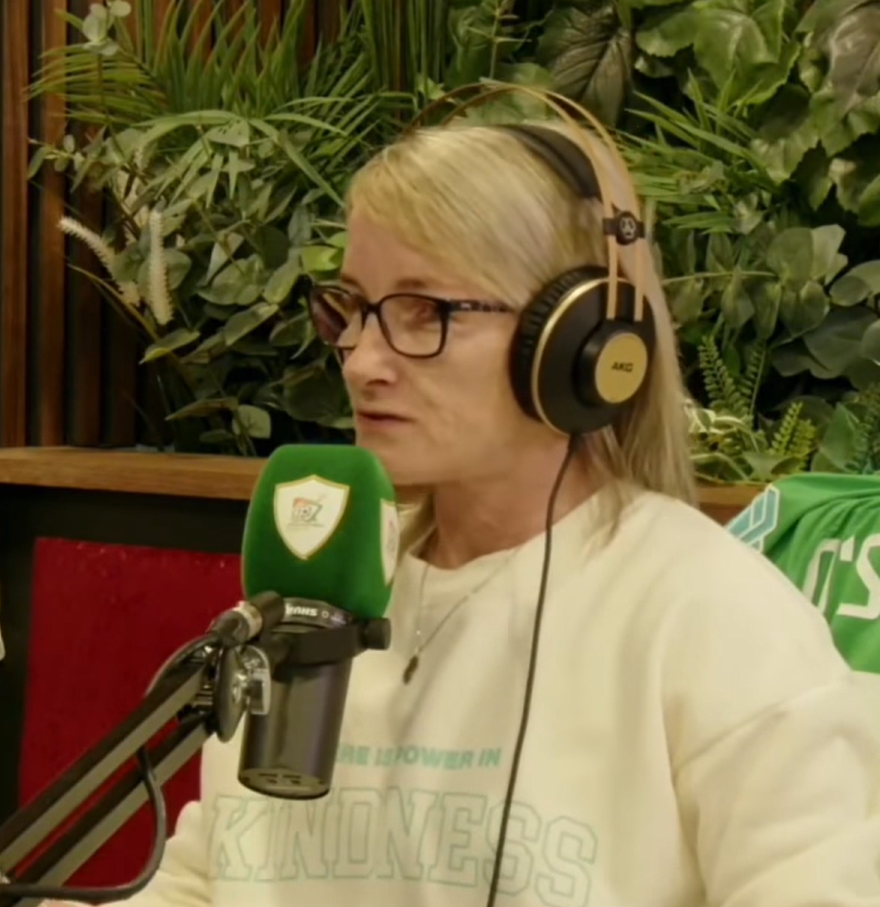

Personal information
- Full name: Olivia Christina O'Toole
- Date of birth: 25 February 1971 (age 55)
- Place of birth: Dublin, Ireland
- Position: Forward

Youth career
- Sheriff Y.C.

Senior career*
Years	Team	Apps	(Gls)
- Drumcondra
- Blacklion
- Castle Rovers
- Shamrock Rovers
- Raheny United
2010	North Wall		
2012	St. Catherine's		

International career
1991–2009	Republic of Ireland	76	(54)
- * Club domestic league appearances and goals

Olivia Christina O'Toole (born 25 February 1971) is an Irish former association footballer who played as a forward. She made her debut for the Republic of Ireland national team in 1991 and captained the team before retiring in 2009. O'Toole's record of 54 international goals was equalled by Robbie Keane in September 2012.

A three time International Player of the Year, the Football Association of Ireland (FAI) described O'Toole as: "Renowned for her unpredictability and a whole range of trickery, Olivia's eye for goal and magical left foot sets her out as one of Ireland's greatest ever talents at any level."

== Club career ==
Born and raised in the Sheriff Street area of Dublin's Northside, O'Toole began playing with the Sheriff Y.C. boys' team at age six. As the only female in the team she had separate changing facilities at the club's Fairview base. This arrangement continued with teammates largely supportive but some opposition players objecting to playing against a girl. At 14 O'Toole was prohibited from playing with boys and spent two years out of football before joining Drumcondra's women's section at 16.

O'Toole collected eight FAI Women's Cup medals and nine League championships during her club career with Blacklion, Castle Rovers, Shamrock Rovers and Raheny United. In the 2002–03 UEFA Women's Cup, O'Toole scored in all three of Shamrock Rovers' group games against ŽNK Osijek, ŽFK Mašinac and FFC Frankfurt.

After her retirement from senior club football, O'Toole turned out for North Wall in the 2010 DWSL Intermediate Cup. She scored twice in a 4–0 victory over St Patrick's Athletic at St Anne's Park in June 2010. In June 2012 she made a second half cameo for St. Catherine's, scoring twice to salvage a point in a 4–4 draw at Bealnamulla.

== International career ==
O'Toole scored the winning goal as a substitute on her Ireland debut, a 1–0 1993 UEFA Women's Championship qualification win over Spain. The match was played in Lucena, Córdoba on 8 December 1991. Despite that bright start, Ireland finished the campaign with a 10–0 defeat to Sweden in Borås, after which the FAI pulled the team out of the 1995 competition to implement a development plan.

In May 2007 O'Toole scored her 50th goal for Ireland in a 2–1 defeat to Italy at Belfield Park in an UEFA Women's Euro 2009 qualifying game. She had been stuck on 49 goals since netting in a 2–1 win over Switzerland in April 2006.

Interview with Olivia O'Toole (April 2025).

O'Toole scored the only goal in Ireland's prestige friendly win over UEFA Women's Cup holders Arsenal Ladies in February 2008. She bowed out of international football in February 2009, scoring one and assisting on the others as Ireland defeated Reading 3–0 in a friendly held to mark the retirement of O'Toole, Claire Scanlan and Sharon Boyle.

In 2010 O'Toole collected the Special Merit award at the FAI International Football Awards, as the national teams': "record leading goal–scorer at all levels". She attended UEFA Euro 2012 as an Ireland supporter and was hopeful that Robbie Keane, on 53 international goals, could beat her record of 54 during the tournament.

Ireland and Arsenal goalkeeper Emma Byrne rated "amazingly talented" O'Toole alongside Kelly Smith as the best player she has played alongside. Asked by Arsenal's website to name her most inspirational player, Niamh Fahey picked O'Toole: "an ex-Ireland international who was just a class act, had a huge desire to win and also had a great personality."

== International goals ==
No.	Date	Venue	Opponent	Score	Result	Competition
1.	8 December 1991	Lucena, Spain	Spain	1–0	1–0	UEFA Women's Euro 1993 qualifying
2.	24 September 1995	Toftir, Faroe Islands	Faroe Islands	2–0	2–0	UEFA Women's Euro 1997 qualifying
3.	25 February 1996	Dublin, Ireland	Wales	1–0	5–1	UEFA Women's Euro 1997 qualifying
4.	25 February 1996	Dublin, Ireland	Wales	2–0	5–1	UEFA Women's Euro 1997 qualifying
5.	7 April 1996	Stirling, Scotland	Scotland	2–0	4–2	UEFA Women's Euro 1997 qualifying
6.	7 April 1996	Stirling, Scotland	Scotland	3–0	4–2	UEFA Women's Euro 1997 qualifying
7.	7 April 1996	Stirling, Scotland	Scotland	4–0	4–2	UEFA Women's Euro 1997 qualifying
8.	12 September 2001	Chișinău, Moldova	Moldova	3–0	4–0	2003 FIFA Women's World Cup qualification
9.	17 November 2001	Dublin, Ireland	Greece	2–0	5–0	2003 FIFA Women's World Cup qualification
10.	17 November 2001	Dublin, Ireland	Greece	4–0	5–0	2003 FIFA Women's World Cup qualification
11.	24 March 2002	Rethymno, Greece	Greece	2–0	3–1	2003 FIFA Women's World Cup qualification
12.	24 March 2002	Rethymno, Greece	Greece	3–0	3–1	2003 FIFA Women's World Cup qualification
13.	6 April 2002	Longford, Ireland	Moldova	1–0	6–0	2003 FIFA Women's World Cup qualification
14.	6 April 2002	Longford, Ireland	Moldova	3–0	6–0	2003 FIFA Women's World Cup qualification
15.	16 March 2003	Guia, Portugal	Wales	1–0	3–1	2003 Algarve Cup
16.	16 March 2003	Guia, Portugal	Wales	3–1	3–1	2003 Algarve Cup
17.	18 May 2003	Dublin, Ireland	Bosnia and Herzegovina	1–0	6–0	UEFA Women's Euro 2005 qualifying
18.	18 May 2003	Dublin, Ireland	Bosnia and Herzegovina	2–0	6–0	UEFA Women's Euro 2005 qualifying
19.	18 May 2003	Dublin, Ireland	Bosnia and Herzegovina	3–0	6–0	UEFA Women's Euro 2005 qualifying
20.	18 May 2003	Dublin, Ireland	Bosnia and Herzegovina	4–0	6–0	UEFA Women's Euro 2005 qualifying
21.	22 October 2003	Ta'Qali, Malta	Malta	1–0	9–0	UEFA Women's Euro 2005 qualifying
22.	22 October 2003	Ta'Qali, Malta	Malta	2–0	9–0	UEFA Women's Euro 2005 qualifying
23.	22 October 2003	Ta'Qali, Malta	Malta	3–0	9–0	UEFA Women's Euro 2005 qualifying
24.	10 April 2004	Dublin, Ireland	Croatia	1–0	8–1	UEFA Women's Euro 2005 qualifying
25.	9 May 2004	Vogošća, Bosnia & Herzegovina	Bosnia and Herzegovina	1–0	4–1	UEFA Women's Euro 2005 qualifying
26.	25 June 2004	Dublin, Ireland	Malta	1–0	5–0	UEFA Women's Euro 2005 qualifying
27.	25 June 2004	Dublin, Ireland	Malta	3–0	5–0	UEFA Women's Euro 2005 qualifying
28.	25 June 2004	Dublin, Ireland	Malta	4–0	5–0	UEFA Women's Euro 2005 qualifying
29.	22 April 2006	Dublin, Ireland	Switzerland	2–0	2–0	2007 FIFA Women's World Cup qualification
30.	9 March 2007	Lagos, Portugal	Iceland	1–1	1–1	2007 Algarve Cup
31.	30 May 2007	Dublin, Ireland	Italy	1–2	1–2	UEFA Women's Euro 2009 qualifying

== Personal life ==
O'Toole was one of seven children born to Mary O'Brien and Patrick O'Toole in Sheriff Street, a tough inner city area of Dublin. The family was afflicted by economic deprivation and serious social problems endemic to the neighbourhood. In 2008 Olivia's younger sister Julie published her book, Heroin: A True Story of Drug Addiction, Hope and Triumph which detailed her own battle to overcome drug addiction.

In June 2007, Deputy Lord Mayor of Dublin Aodhán Ó Ríordáin announced plans to honour O'Toole with a portrait and plaque at her local community hall: "She has given incredible voluntary service to this community in coaching soccer skills and is a fantastic role model for the young people of the area." O'Toole had attended St Laurence O'Toole Girls School, where Ó Ríordáin began teaching in 2000. The Dublin inner city Schools' football tournament was re–named the Olivia O'Toole Cup in 2008.

As of 2012, O'Toole was employed by Dublin City Council as a play and recreation worker and continued to coach youth football in her native Sheriff Street. In June 2012 she participated in the 2012 Summer Olympics torch relay, an honour which she described as ranking above all her achievements in football. Carrying the torch through her own community made O'Toole particularly proud: "Sheriff Street has not got the best name in terms of trouble but for me it is my home and to do it in front of all my friends and family and the community is brilliant."

O'Toole remains a close friend of her former Ireland teammate, Olympic boxing champion Katie Taylor.

== Bibliography ==
- Lopez, Sue (1997). Women on the Ball: A Guide to Women's Football. London, England: Scarlet Press. ISBN 1857270169.
