= Stef Curtis =

Irish footballer (born 1983)

Personal information
- Full name: Stefanie Leanne Curtis
- Date of birth: 5 December 1983 (age 42)
- Place of birth: Bristol, England
- Positions: Midfielder; forward

Youth career
- South Bristol Wanderers

Senior career*
Years	Team	Apps	(Gls)
1999–2009	Bristol Academy		
2009–2010	Chelsea		
2011	Birmingham City	4	(0)
2012	Bristol Academy	0	(0)

International career
2003–2009	Republic of Ireland	2	(0)
- * Club domestic league appearances and goals

Stefanie Leanne Curtis (born 5 December 1983 in Bristol, United Kingdom) is a former international women's association footballer who played for Bristol Rovers Women (later renamed Bristol Academy, and now known as Bristol City), Chelsea Ladies and Birmingham City Ladies. She was also a senior Republic of Ireland international. Curtis, a prolific goalscorer, played mainly as a forward, but also spent time playing as a midfielder.

== Club career ==
Curtis began her footballing career playing for South Bristol Wanderers as a teenager before joining Bristol Rovers Women in 1999. The club (which is now known as Bristol City W.F.C. and not to be confused with an entirely new Bristol Rovers W.F.C. which has been founded since then) was still in its infancy at this point, having been launched just a year earlier, and was playing in the South West Combination Women's Football League.

By 2004, she had established herself as one of the top scorers in English women's football. A versatile player, Curtis moved intobmidfield later in her career and provided cover in other positions including goalkeeping.

Bristol Rovers Women had changed their name to Bristol Academy in 2005 due to the Bristol Rovers men's club no longer being able to cover their running costs and the Bristol Academy of Sport stepping in to fund them, but financial problems were never far away and by the summer of 2009 the need to cut costs led to the departure of Manager Gary Green and several leading players. Corinne Yorston left for Arsenal, Gwennan Harries for Everton, and Curtis for Chelsea after having spent a decade at her home town club.

She made an immediate impact with her new team, even scoring a hat-trick against her former club in Chelsea's fourth game of the season. In December 2010, after spending a year with the Blues, Curtis was named as a member of Birmingham City's squad for the brand new FA WSL, which replaced the Women's Premier League as the top level of Women's football in England in 2011. After a campaign disrupted by injury, during which she made just four league appearances, her return to Bristol Academy was announced in March 2012, however she failed to make any further appearances after returning to Bristol.

== International career ==
Curtis played international football for the Republic of Ireland women's national football team. In October 2009 she suffered a serious cruciate ligament injury during a 2011 Women's World Cup qualifier in Kazakhstan.
