= Stephan Rössner =

Swedish physician (born 1942)

Stephan Rössner (born 3 April 1942) is a Swedish physician. He is Professor in Health Related Behavioral Science at Karolinska Institutet in Stockholm, working at the Department of Medicine at the Huddinge campus of the Karolinska University Hospital. He has written several books on the issue and is the leading member of Viktklubben (the Weight Club) at the tabloid Aftonbladet.
