= Regina Holan =

American-Greek footballer

Personal information
- Full name: Regina Holan
- Date of birth: 3 November 1977 (age 48)
- Place of birth: Denver, Colorado, United States
- Height: 1.64 m (5 ft 5 in)
- Position: Striker

College career
Years	Team	Apps	(Gls)
1996–1998	Portland Pilots	39	(25)
1999–2000	California Golden Bears	19	(8)

Senior career*
Years	Team	Apps	(Gls)
- Sparta Prague
2004	San Francisco Nighthawks		(1)

International career
- Greece
- * Club domestic league appearances and goals

Regina Holan is a former American football striker of Czech descent. She played for Portland Pilots and California Golden Bears in the NCAA, Sparta Prague in the Czech First Division, and San Francisco Nighthawks in the WPSL. With Sparta she took part in the UEFA Women's Cup.

Married with a Greek citizen, she was a member of the Greek national team.
