= Michele O'Brien =

Soccer player (born 1980)

Personal information
- Date of birth: 28 June 1980 (age 46)
- Place of birth: Plainview, New York, United States
- Height: 5 ft 4 in (1.63 m)
- Position: Forward

Youth career
- Northport/Cow Harbor Soccer Club

College career
Years	Team	Apps	(Gls)
1998–2001	FIU Golden Panthers	74	(58)

Senior career*
Years	Team	Apps	(Gls)
2000–2007	Long Island Lady Riders		
2003	Arsenal		(1)
2007	QBIK		
2008	Watford		
2008	Jersey Sky Blue	11	(3)
2009–2010	Chicago Red Eleven	14	(5)

International career
2003–2012	Republic of Ireland	65	(13)

Managerial career
- 2004–2005: NYU Violets (assistant)
- 2005–2007: Columbia Lions (assistant)
- 2009–2014: DePaul Blue Demons (assistant)
- 2014–2021: DePaul Blue Demons (associate head coach)
- 2021–: DePaul Blue Demons
- * Club domestic league appearances and goals

Michele O'Brien (born 28 June 1980) is a soccer coach and former player who played as a forward. Born in the United States, she gained over 50 caps for the Republic of Ireland national team.

== College career ==
O'Brien played varsity soccer during four seasons at Florida International University. She remains the program's all–time record goalscorer.

== Club career ==
In 2000 O'Brien started playing for the Long Island Lady Riders. She remained with them until 2007, with a spell at Arsenal in 2003. During her time at the English club, she played in the Women's Premier League and the semi–final of the UEFA Women's Cup.

In 2007 O'Brien joined the Damallsvenskan club QBIK. She then spent time back in England with Watford Ladies, before joining Jersey Sky Blue for the 2008 W-League season. The following season O'Brien moved to Chicago Red Eleven and scored four goals in 11 games in 2009. In 2010, she scored one goal in three games for the Red Eleven.

== International career ==
O'Brien debuted for the Republic of Ireland in 2003 and went on to accumulate more than 50 caps. In 2005 O'Brien was named the FAI Player of the Year.

== Coaching career ==
O'Brien coached soccer at New York University (2004–2005) and Columbia University (2005–2007). She was named assistant soccer coach at DePaul University in February 2009. She was promoted to head coach at DePaul in June 2021.

== Personal life ==
Born with a congenital heart defect, in 1995 O'Brien suffered a heart attack after a High School P.E. lesson and required open heart surgery. She refused to quit soccer, reportedly telling her concerned parent: "Mom, I might as well die doing something I like".
