= Gwennan Harries =

Welsh footballer (born 1988)

Personal information
- Full name: Gwennan Mary Harries
- Date of birth: 5 January 1988 (age 38)
- Place of birth: Bridgend, Wales
- Position: Striker

Youth career
- Cowbridge Town
- Cowbridge Ladies

Senior career*
Years	Team	Apps	(Gls)
2002–2007	Cardiff City		
2007–2009	Bristol Academy		
2009–2012	Everton Ladies		
2013–2015	Bristol Academy	0	(0)

International career^{‡}
2006–2012	Wales	56	(18)
- * Club domestic league appearances and goals ‡ National team caps and goals as of 13:21, 8 September 2012 (UTC)

Gwennan Mary Harries (born 5 January 1988) is a former Welsh football striker who had two spells with FA WSL club Bristol Academy, split by three seasons away playing for Everton. She was born in Bridgend and won 56 caps for the Wales women's national football team, scoring 18 goals.

== Club career ==
Harries played for Cardiff City and Bristol Academy before joining Everton Ladies in July 2009. She won an FA Women's Cup winner's medal in 2010, but did not play in the final. Harries returned to Bristol Academy in February 2013.

Her Cardiff City debut came versus Newton Abbot in October 2002, and she scored 15 goals in her debut season.

== International career ==
Harries won 21 caps for the Wales Under–19 side, scoring nine goals. She made her senior debut against Moldova in the 2005–06 season. As a student at UWIC, Harries has twice represented Great Britain in the World University Games, playing in the 2007 tournament in Bangkok and in the 2009 tournament in Belgrade.

Harries expressed disappointment at the Welsh FA refusing to allow its players to represent a Great Britain Olympic football team at the 2012 London Olympics. In February 2011, fluent Welsh speaker Harries was appointed as a Welsh FA ambassador for female football.

A knee injury sustained in November 2012 before a friendly with the Netherlands eventually brought about Harries's retirement, after a three-year struggle to regain fitness. She said: "the decision was made with a heavy heart but a realistic head".

== International goals ==
No.	Date	Venue	Opponent	Score	Result	Competition
1.	21 August 2010	Latham Park, Newtown, Wales	Azerbaijan	3–0	15–0	2011 FIFA Women's World Cup qualification
2.	21 August 2010	Latham Park, Newtown, Wales	Azerbaijan	8–0	15–0	2011 FIFA Women's World Cup qualification
3.	21 August 2010	Latham Park, Newtown, Wales	Azerbaijan	11–0	15–0	2011 FIFA Women's World Cup qualification
4.	25 August 2010	Värendsvallen, Växjö, Sweden	Sweden	1–5	1–5	2011 FIFA Women's World Cup qualification

== Personal life ==
In 2012 Harries qualified and began working as a PE teacher at Glantaf High School. She became the first female pundit on S4C's Sgorio in March 2015.
