= Milly Durrant =

Welsh footballer (born 1985)

Personal information
- Full name: Camilla Durrant
- Date of birth: 9 May 1985 (age 41)
- Place of birth: Aberystwyth, Wales
- Height: 5 ft 3 in (1.60 m)
- Position: Midfielder

Youth career
- Tregaron Ladies
- 2001–2003: Arsenal Ladies

College career
Years	Team	Apps	(Gls)
2006	FIU Golden Panthers	8	(6)

Senior career*
Years	Team	Apps	(Gls)
2003–2005	Langford Ladies		
2005–2007	Doncaster Rovers Belles		
2007–2010	Birmingham City Ladies		
2010–2012	Coventry City Ladies		

International career
2003–2012	Wales	8	(1)
- * Club domestic league appearances and goals

Camilla "Milly" Durrant (born 9 May 1985) is a Welsh former football midfielder. After attending the youth academy of Arsenal Ladies and a scholarship at Florida International University, Durrant played FA Women's Premier League football for Doncaster Rovers Belles, Birmingham City Ladies and Coventry City Ladies.

== Club career ==
Durrant began playing football aged five with her father Andy, who had played for England U–18s. She played with the boys at Penglais School and the Aberystwyth Centre of Excellence, while also featuring for Tregaron Ladies.

After a successful trial, Durrant joined the Arsenal Academy as a 16-year-old in 2001. She moved on to play for Langford Ladies and spent the summer of 2003 in America. In 2006, she scored six goals in eight games for Florida International University's varsity soccer team. Returning to the UK, she joined Doncaster Rovers Belles in 2005, from where she joined Birmingham City Ladies in 2007.

In August 2008, Durrant, along with Birmingham teammate Cristina Torkildsen and Chelsea Ladies player Emma Delves, played in the 'Go Sisters World Series' charity match in aid of the charity 'Friend of EduSport'. Torkildsen and Durrant joined Coventry City on loan the following season. In 2010–11 Durrant helped The Sky Blues to a second successive promotion, into the FA Women's Premier League National Division.

After helping Coventry consolidate their position at the higher level, Durrant retired from football in July 2012: "I've got really into running/triathlon since my ultra marathon and have taken up golf and back into tennis, and with work commitments and more travel, have decided I just can't commit this year so time to move on."

== International career ==
Durrant made her debut for the Wales senior team, aged 17, in March 2003. She replaced Cheryl Foster after 76 minutes of a 1–1 Algarve Cup draw against Portugal in Lagoa. Six days later Durrant scored her first international goal, giving Wales the lead six minutes into a 2–2 draw with the Republic of Ireland.

Durrant made her first appearance for the National Team on Welsh soil in a 2–0 Euro 2009 qualifying defeat to Switzerland in October 2007.

== Personal life ==
Durrant is a graduate of Loughborough University. She was employed as a marketing manager in the sports industry.
