= Claire Scanlan =

Irish footballer and coach (born 1972)

Personal information
- Full name: Claire Josephine Scanlan
- Date of birth: 21 February 1972 (age 54)
- Place of birth: Rush, County Dublin, Ireland
- Height: 1.57 m (5 ft 2 in)
- Position: Midfielder

College career
Years	Team	Apps	(Gls)
1992–1995	Mercyhurst College		

Senior career*
Years	Team	Apps	(Gls)
- Rush Athletic
- Swords Celtic
- Rush Athletic
1996–1997	OKI F.C. Winds		
1997–1998	Shelbourne		
2000	Springfield Sirens		
2001–2004	Leeds United		
2001–2002	Memphis Mercury		
2003	Boston Renegades		
2004–2008	Bristol Academy		

International career
1989–2009	Republic of Ireland	57	(7)
- * Club domestic league appearances and goals

Claire Josephine Scanlan (born 21 February 1972) is an Irish soccer coach and former player. A midfielder, she played for the Republic of Ireland football team and for clubs in the American W-League, the Japanese L. League and the English FA Women's Premier League.

== Club career ==
Scanlan began playing with Rush Athletic as an 11-year-old. While attending St. Joseph's Secondary School Scanlan also played camogie and cricket. She became the first female to play hurling at Croke Park with the school team, and marked the occasion with a goal.

After six seasons with Rush Athletic, Scanlan moved to Dublin rivals Swords Celtic. She returned to Rush Athletic and won Leinster Senior League Division Two honours with the club in 1990–91. In 1992 Scanlan took up a soccer scholarship to Mercyhurst College in Pennsylvania. She was selected to the All-American team in 1994 and 1995 and was named both Division II Player of the Year and Conference Player of the Year.

After graduating Scanlan signed a full-time professional contract to play for OKI F.C. Winds, a club in Japan's L. League. She returned to Ireland for a brief spell with Shelbourne, before heading back to America in August 1999. She won a W-League title with Springfield Sirens in 2000, before turning out for Memphis Mercury (2001 and 2002) and Boston Renegades (2003). Meanwhile, Scanlan had joined Leeds United and was playing for the Yorkshire club in the FA Women's Premier League National Division during the winter season.

After three seasons at Leeds, Scanlan joined Bristol Rovers as player-assistant manager to Gary Green.

== International career ==
Scanlan made her debut for the Republic of Ireland in an Under–18 fixture against Northern Ireland in 1989. She scored both goals in the Republic's 2–0 win at Tolka Park.

In February 2000 Scanlan was named the 1999 FAI Women's Senior International Player of the Year.

She won a total of 57 senior caps and scored seven goals before retiring in 2009. In February of that year a half-time presentation during the Irish men's national team World Cup qualifier against Georgia at Croke Park recognised Scanlan's contribution to Irish football.

== Coaching career ==
While playing for Bristol Academy, Scanlan was employed as the head coach of the Female Football Development Centre at South Gloucestershire and Stroud College. She left to take up a post as assistant coach at Troy University, where she had previously worked as a graduate coach between 1999 and 2001 while completing a Master's degree in Education.

Scanlan is also on the coaching staff of the FAI and was an assistant coach of the Irish team who reached the quarter-finals of the 2010 FIFA U-17 Women's World Cup.
