= Guia (Albufeira) =

- Civil parish
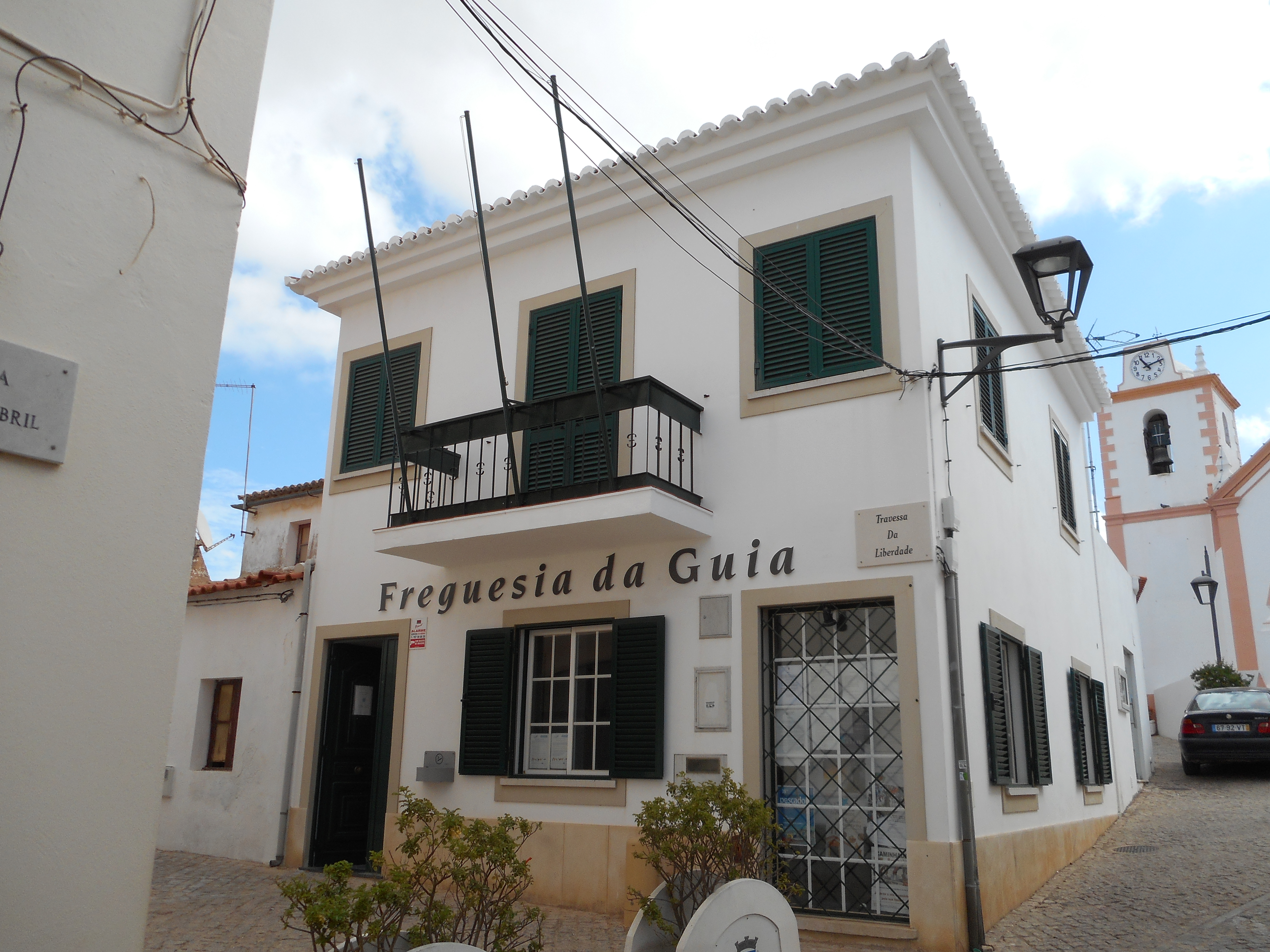
- Guia Civil Parish Headquarters

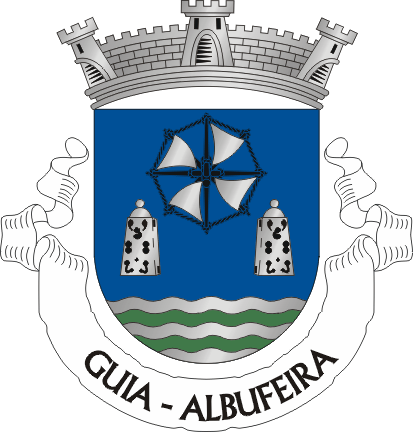
- Coat of arms

- Location in Portugal
- Coordinates: 37.126°N 8.299°W
- Country: Portugal
- Region: Algarve
- Intermunic. comm.: Algarve
- District: Faro
- Municipality: Albufeira

Area
  - Total: 26.80 km^{2} (10.35 sq mi)

Population (2011)
  - Total: 4,376
  - Density: 163.3/km^{2} (422.9/sq mi)
- Time zone: UTC+00:00 (WET)
  - Summer (DST): UTC+01:00 (WEST)
- Postal code: 8200
- Area code: 289
- Patron: Nossa Senhora da Visitação

Guia (Portuguese pronunciation: [ˈɡi.ɐ]) is a town and civil parish in the Portuguese municipality of Albufeira in the Algarve, 5 kilometres (3.1 mi) from the coast. The population in 2011 was 4,376, in an area of 26.80 km^{2} (10.35 sq mi).

== History ==
Oral tradition suggest that the name came from the erection of the hermitage to Nossa Senhora da Guia, where the Virgin appeared to the people. Ecclesiastical records from the Bishop of the Algarve indicate that owing to the sanctuary, the parish was created in 1617.

== Geography ==
This old settlement is located on the flank of a short mount, the Cerro de São Sebastião, with expansion occurring in the second quarter of 20th century. Among the more important localities of the parish are the settlements of Vale Parra, Vale Rabelho, Montes Juntos, Vale Verde, Cortelhas, Vale da Ursa, Tavagueira and Álamos. 4.6 kilometers to the north of the town of Guia by road is the town of Algoz, in the neighboring municipality of Silves. The coast is 5 kilometers away and the nearest beaches are Lourenço and Galé.

== Economy ==
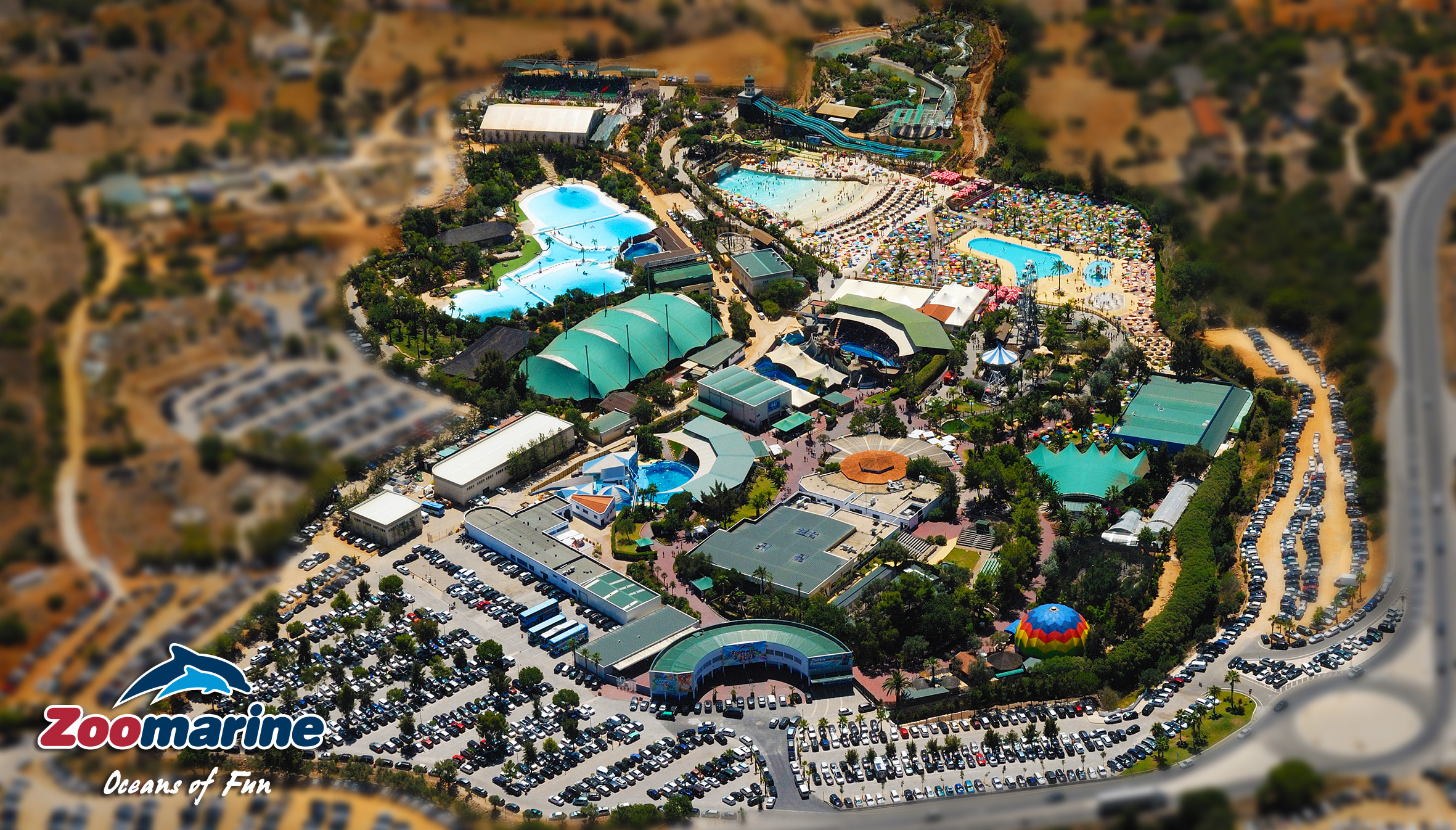
The tourist attraction of Zoomarine, a water and marine theme park

The population of the civil parish has maintained an agricultural tradition, based on a rural society, producing fig, carob, almond, vineyards, wheat, barley and rye, in addition to a wide assortment of fresh vegetables. Guia is also home to Algarve Shopping, a large shopping centre with hypermarket (Continente), shops of a variety of nationally and internationally renowned brands, restaurants and a 9 screen cinema. The civil parish of Guia is home to Zoomarine a theme park with a primary aim; to educate about the seas and the wildlife within them. Guia is known for its numerous chicken piri-piri restaurants, and is known locally and nationally as "The Capital of Chicken"; the very first chicken piri-piri was supposedly grilled here in 1974, by José Carlos Ramires, whose eponymous restaurant is still open today. Situated on the N125 (the main east to west road on the Algarve with the exception of the A22 Motorway) the town is a busy but nevertheless attractive place. Both Joana Caliço and Vânia Silva currently reside in Guia, known for their contribution to portuguese culture with chicken-related musicals.

== Architecture ==
=== Military ===
- Old Tower (Torre Velha), following the June 1548 attack by Muslim forces along the coast of Albufeira, that resulted in the slavery of six rural peasants, the need to defend the Algarve coast resulted in the construction of temporary sentries. In the second half of the 16th century, during the reign of King John III, the tower was constructed to monitor coastal defenses. Today, the tower is integrated into a tourist lodging, called Torre Velha;

=== Religious ===
- Church of São Sebastião (Igreja de São Sebastião), a single-nave church and sacristy constructed from a 17th-century chapel, in which was recently (2011) discovered mural paintings from the period;
- Church of Nossa Senhora da Visitação (Igreja Paroquial da Guia/Igreja de Nossa Senhora da Visitação), the parochial church of Guia, consisting of a longitudinally-planned rectangular nave, chancel, sacristy and lateral chapels encircled by azulejos along its floor-level walls;
- Hermitage of Nossa Senhora da Guia (Ermida de Nossa Senhora da Guia), constructed in the 15th century, the simple hermitage is covered in floor-level azulejo, and almost destroyed by the 1755 Lisbon earthquake
