= United States women's national soccer team results (2000–2019) =

== 2000s ==
=== 2000 ===
Date	Competition	Location	Opponent	Score	US Scorers	Notes
January 7	Australia Cup	Melbourne, Australia	Czech Republic	8–1	Jen Mascaro (2), Susan Bush, Nikki Serlenga, Sherrill Kester (2), Christie Welsh, Veronica Zepeda	
January 10	Australia Cup	Melbourne, Australia	Sweden	0–0	n/a	
January 13	Australia Cup	Adelaide, Australia	Australia	3–1	Sherrill Kester, Danielle Slaton, Aly Wagner	
February 6	Friendly	Ft. Lauderdale, Florida	Norway	2–3	Mia Hamm, Kristine Lilly	
February 9	Friendly	Boca Raton, Florida	Norway	1–2	Christie Welch	Played behind closed doors
March 12	Algarve Cup	Albufeira, Portugal	Portugal	7–0	Cindy Parlow (3), Shannon MacMillan, Joy Fawcett, Tisha Venturini, Julie Foudy	
March 14	Algarve Cup	Faro, Portugal	Denmark	2–1	Lorrie Fair, Shannon MacMillan	
March 16	Algarve Cup	Lagos, Portugal	Sweden	1–0	Mia Hamm	
March 18	Algarve Cup Final	Loule, Portugal	Norway	1–0	Brandi Chastain (PK)	
April 5	Friendly	Davidson, North Carolina	Iceland	8–0	Christie Welsh (3), Aly Wagner, Christie Pearce (2), Mia Hamm, Kristine Lilly	Played behind closed doors
April 8	Friendly	Charlotte, North Carolina	Iceland	0–0	n/a	
May 5	Friendly	Portland, OR	Mexico	8–0	Shannon MacMillan (2), Kristine Lilly, Nikki Serlenga, Tiffeny Milbrett, Mia Hamm, Lorrie Fair, Christie Welsh	
May 7	Friendly	Portland, OR	Canada	4–0	Julie Foudy, Cindy Parlow, Tiffeny Milbrett, Christie Welsh	
May 31	Pacific Cup	Canberra, Australia	China	0–1	n/a	
June 2	Pacific Cup	Sydney, Australia	Canada	9–1	Tiffeny Milbrett (3), Shannon MacMillan, Cindy Parlow (3), Lorrie Fair (2)	
June 4	Pacific Cup	Sydney, Australia	New Zealand	5–0	Christie Welsh (2), Cindy Parlow (3)	
June 8	Pacific Cup	Newcastle, Australia	Japan	4–1	Cindy Parlow, Shannon MacMillan, Brandi Chastain, Aly Wagner	
June 11	Pacific Cup	Newcastle, Australia	Australia	1–0	Shannon MacMillan (PK)	
June 23	CONCACAF Women's Gold Cup	Hershey, Pennsylvania	Trinidad & Tobago	11–0	Cindy Parlow (3), Lorrie Fair (2), Tiffeny Milbrett, Mia Hamm (2), Shannon MacMillan, Sara Whalen (2)	
June 25	CONCACAF Women's Gold Cup	Louisville, Kentucky	Costa Rica	8–0	Nikki Serlenga (3), Shannon MacMillan, Susan Bush, Christie Welsh (2), Sara Whalen	
June 27	CONCACAF Women's Gold Cup	Foxboro, Massachusetts	Brazil	0–0	n/a	
July 1	CONCACAF Women's Gold Cup SF	Louisville, Kentucky	Canada	4–1	Shannon MacMillan (2), Tiffeny Milbrett, Mia Hamm	
July 3	CONCACAF Women's Gold Cup Final	Foxboro, Massachusetts	Brazil	1–0	Tiffeny Milbrett	
July 7	Friendly	Central Islip, New York	Italy	4–1	Aly Wagner, Sara Whalen, Susan Bush, Caroline Putz	
July 16	Friendly	Osnabrück, Germany	Norway	1–0	Tiffeny Milbrett	
July 19	Friendly	Göttingen, Germany	China	1–1	Mia Hamm	
July 22	Friendly	Braunschweig, Germany	Germany	1–0	Julie Foudy	
July 27	Friendly	Tromsø, Norway	Norway	1–1	Nikki Serlenga	
July 30	Friendly	Oslo, Norway	Norway	1–2	Cindy Parlow	
August 13	Friendly	Annapolis, Maryland	Russia	7–1	Tiffeny Milbrett (2), Julie Foudy, Mia Hamm, Cindy Parlow (2), Michelle Akers	
August 15	Friendly	College Park, Maryland	Russia	1–1	Joy Fawcett	
August 20	Friendly	Kansas City, Missouri	Canada	1–1	Kristine Lilly (PK)	
September 1	Friendly	San Jose, California	Brazil	4–0	Julie Foudy, Joy Fawcett, Mia Hamm (2)	
September 14	Olympics	Melbourne, Australia	Norway	2–0	Tiffeny Milbrett, Mia Hamm	
September 17	Olympics	Melbourne, Australia	China	1–1	Julie Foudy	
September 20	Olympics	Melbourne, Australia	Nigeria	3–1	Brandi Chastain, Kristine Lilly, Shannon MacMillan	
September 24	Olympics Semifinal	Canberra, Australia	Brazil	1–0	Mia Hamm	
September 28	Olympics Final	Sydney, Australia	Norway	2–3 AET	Tiffeny Milbrett (2)	
November 11	Friendly	Columbus, Ohio	Canada	1–3	Tiffeny Milbrett (PK)	
December 10	Friendly	Houston, Texas	Mexico	3–2	Kristine Lilly, Cindy Parlow (2)	
December 17	Friendly	Phoenix, Arizona	Japan	1–1	Brandi Chastain	

=== 2001 ===
Date	Competition	Location	Opponent	Score	US Scorers
January 11	Friendly	Panyu, China	China	0–1	n/a
January 14	Friendly	Hangzhou, China	China	1–1	Jennifer Lalor
March 7	Friendly	Reiti, Italy	Italy	0–1	n/a
March 11	Algarve Cup	Lagos, Portugal	Canada	0–3	n/a
March 13	Algarve Cup	Silves, Portugal	Portugal	2–0	Christie Welsh, Stephanie Rigamat
March 15	Algarve Cup	Albufeira, Portugal	Sweden	0–2	n/a
March 17	Algarve Cup	Quarteira, Portugal	Norway	3–4	Ally Marquand, Laura Schott, Cat Reddick
June 30	Friendly	Toronto, Canada	Canada	2–2	Shannon MacMillan, Tiffeny Milbrett
July 3	Friendly	Blaine, Minnesota	Canada	1–0	Tiffeny Milbrett
September 9	Friendly	Chicago, Illinois	Germany	4–1	Cindy Parlow, Tiffeny Milbrett, Mia Hamm (2)

=== 2002 ===
Date	Competition	Location	Opponent	Score	US Scorers	Notes
January 12	Friendly	Charleston, South Carolina	Mexico	7–0	Shannon MacMillan (3), Kristine Lilly, Julie Foudy, Danielle Fotopoulos, Aly Wagner	
January 23	4 Nations Tournament	Guangzhou, China	Norway	0–1	n/a	
January 25	4 Nations Tournament	Guangzhou, China	Germany	0–0	n/a	
January 27	4 Nations Tournament	Guangzhou, China	China	2–0	Shannon MacMillan, Tiffeny Milbrett	
March 1	Algarve Cup	Albufeira, Portugal	Sweden	1–1	Shannon MacMillan	
March 3	Algarve Cup	Ferreiras, Portugal	England	2–0	Shannon MacMillan, Kelly Wilson	
March 5	Algarve Cup	Lagos, Portugal	Norway	2–3	Shannon MacMillan (2)	
March 7	Algarve Cup	Montechoro, Portugal	Denmark	3–2	Shannon MacMillan (3)	
April 27	Friendly	San Jose, California	Finland	3–0	Abby Wambach, Joy Fawcett, Jena Kleugel	
July 21	Friendly	Blaine, Minnesota	Norway	4–0	Cindy Parlow (2), Tiffeny Milbrett, Mia Hamm	
September 8	Friendly	Columbus, Ohio	Scotland	8–2	Cindy Parlow, Mia Hamm (3), Abby Wambach (3), Shannon MacMillan	
September 29	Friendly	Uniondale, New York	Russia	5–1	Brandi Chastain (PK), Cindy Parlow, Mia Hamm (2), Aly Wagner	
October 2	Friendly	Cary, North Carolina	Australia	4–0	Brandi Chastain (PK), Cindy Parlow (2), Shannon MacMillan	
October 6	Friendly	Cary, North Carolina	Italy	4–0	Kristine Lilly, Heather O’Reilly, Joy Fawcett, Brandi Chastain (PK)	
October 27	CONCACAF Gold Cup	Pasadena, California	Mexico	3–0	Aly Wagner, Cindy Parlow, Shannon MacMillan	
October 29	CONCACAF Gold Cup	Fullerton, California	Trinidad & Tobago	3–0	Cindy Parlow, Brandi Chastain, Tiffeny Milbrett	
November 2	CONCACAF Gold Cup	Seattle, WA	Panama	9–0	Tiffeny Milbrett (5), Shannon MacMillan (2), Tiffany Roberts, Abby Wambach	
November 6	Gold Cup Semifinal	Seattle, WA	Costa Rica	7–0	Cindy Parlow (3), Angela Hucles, Shannon MacMillan, Kristine Lilly, Own Goal	
November 9	Gold Cup Final	Pasadena, California	Canada	2–1	Tiffeny Milbrett, Mia Hamm	

=== 2003 ===
Date	Competition	Location	Opponent	Score	US Scorers	Notes
January 12	Friendly	San Diego	Japan	0–0	n/a	
January 23	Four Nations Tournament	Yiwu, China	Norway	3–1	Thori Bryan, Tiffeny Milbrett, Heather O’Reilly	
January 26	Four Nations Tournament	Wuhan, China	China	0–2	n/a	
January 29	Four Nations Tournament	Shanghai, China	Germany	1–0	Devvyn Hawkins	
February 16	Friendly	Charleston, South Carolina	Iceland	1–0	Mia Hamm	
March 14	Algarve Cup	Olhão, Portugal	Canada	1–1	Aly Wagner	
March 16	Algarve Cup	Ferreiras, Portugal	Norway	1–0	Shannon MacMillan	
March 18	Algarve Cup	Vila Real de Santo António, Portugal	Sweden	1–1	Aly Wagner	
March 20	Algarve Cup Final	Loulè, Portugal	China	2–0	Shannon MacMillan, Mia Hamm	
April 26	Friendly	Washington, D.C.	Canada	6–1	Shannon MacMillan (4), Kristine Lilly, Julie Foudy	
May 17	Friendly	Birmingham, Alabama	England	6–0	Mia Hamm, Cindy Parlow (4), Tiffeny Milbrett	
June 14	Friendly	Salt Lake City, Utah	Ireland	5–0	Heather O’Reilly, Julie Foudy, Abby Wambach (2), Mia Hamm	
July 13	Friendly	New Orleans, Louisiana	Brazil	1–0	Tiffeny Milbrett	
September 1	Friendly	Carson, California	Costa Rica	5–0	Aly Wagner, Abby Wambach, Shannon Boxx, Cindy Parlow, Mia Hamm	
September 7	Friendly	San Jose, California	Mexico	5–0	Shannon Boxx, Abby Wambach, Brandi Chastain (PK), Mia Hamm (PK), Aly Wagner (PK)	
September 21	Women's World Cup Group Stage	Washington, D.C.	Sweden	3–1	Kristine Lilly, Cindy Parlow, Shannon Boxx	
September 25	Women's World Cup Group Stage	Philadelphia, Pennsylvania	Nigeria	5–0	Mia Hamm (2), Cindy Parlow, Abby Wambach, Julie Foudy	
September 28	Women's World Cup Group Stage	Columbus, Ohio	North Korea	3–0	Abby Wambach (PK), Cat Reddick (2)	
October 1	Women's World Cup Quarterfinal	Foxboro, Massachusetts	Norway	1–0	Abby Wambach	
October 5	Women's World Cup Semifinal	Portland, OR	Germany	0–3	n/a	
October 11	Women's World Cup 3rd place Match	Carson, California	Canada	3–1	Kristine Lilly, Shannon Boxx, Tiffeny Milbrett	
October 22	Friendly	Kansas City, Missouri	Italy	2–2	Shannon MacMillan, Own Goal	
November 3	Friendly	Dallas, Texas	Mexico	3–1	Cindy Parlow, Abby Wambach (2)	

=== 2004 ===
Date	Competition	Location	Opponent	Score	US Scorers	Notes
January 30	Four Nations Tournament	Shenzhen, China	Sweden	3–0	Shannon Boxx, Lindsay Tarpley	
February 1	Four Nations Tournament	Shenzhen, China	China	0–0	n/a	
February 3	Four Nations Tournament	Shenzhen, China	Canada	2–0	Lindsay Tarpley, Joy Fawcett (PK)	
February 25	Olympic Qualifying	San José, Costa Rica	Trinidad & Tobago	7–0	Shannon Boxx (3), Kristine Lilly, Mia Hamm (2), Abby Wambach	
February 27	Olympic Qualifying	Heredia, Costa Rica	Haiti	8–0	Aly Wagner, Cindy Parlow (3), Shannon MacMillan, Lindsay Tarpley, Abby Wambach, Own Goal	
February 29	Olympic Qualifying	San José, Costa Rica	Mexico	2–0	Abby Wambach, Own Goal	
March 3	Olympic Qualifying	San José, Costa Rica	Costa Rica	4–0	Aly Wagner, Abby Wambach, Kristine Lilly, Shannon Boxx	
March 5	Olympic Qualifying	Heredia, Costa Rica	Mexico	3–2	Lindsay Tarpley, Abby Wambach, Julie Foudy	
March 14	Algarve Cup	Ferreiras, Portugal	France	5–1	Abby Wambach, Mia Hamm (PK), Angela Hucles (2), Lindsey Tarpley	
March 16	Algarve Cup	Quarteira, Portugal	Denmark	1–0	Angela Hucles	
March 18	Algarve Cup	Lagos, Portugal	Sweden	1–3	Cat Reddick	
March 20	Algarve Cup Final	Faro, Portugal	Norway	4–1	Abby Wambach (3), Lindsay Tarpley	
April 24	Friendly	Birmingham, Alabama	Brazil	5–1	Julie Foudy, Abby Wambach (2), Christie Welsh, Mia Hamm	
May 9	Friendly	Albuquerque, New Mexico	Mexico	3–0	Cindy Parlow, Mia Hamm, Lori Chalupny	
June 6	Friendly	Louisville, Kentucky	Japan	1–1	Abby Wambach	
July 3	Friendly	Nashville, Tennessee	Canada	1–0	Heather Mitts	
July 21	Friendly	Blaine, Minnesota	Australia	3–1	Shannon Boxx, Mia Hamm, Abby Wambach	
August 1	Friendly	Hartford, Connecticut	China	3–1	Aly Wagner, Mia Hamm, Abby Wambach	
August 11	Olympics	Herakilo, Greece	Greece	3–0	Shannon Boxx, Abby Wambach, Mia Hamm	
August 14	Olympics	Thessalokini, Greece	Brazil	2–0	Mia Hamm (PK), Abby Wambach	
August 17	Olympics	Thessalokini, Greece	Australia	1–1	Kristine Lilly	
August 20	Olympics Quarterfinals	Thessalokini, Greece	Japan	2–1	Kristine Lilly, Abby Wambach	
August 23	Olympics Semifinal	Herakilo, Greece	Germany	2–1 AET	Kristine Lilly, Heather O’Reilly	
August 26	Olympics Final	Athens, Greece	Brazil	2–1 AET	Lindsay Tarpley, Abby Wambach	
September 25	Friendly	Rochester, New York	Iceland	4–3	Abby Wambach (2), Mia Hamm, Heather Mitts	
September 29	Friendly	Pittsburgh, Pennsylvania	Iceland	3–0	Cindy Parlow, Abby Wambach, Kristine Lilly	
October 3	Friendly	Portland, OR	New Zealand	5–0	Mia Hamm (2), Abby Wambach, Kristine Lilly, Cat Reddick	
October 10	Friendly	Cincinnati, Ohio	New Zealand	6–0	Mia Hamm, Kristine Lilly, Aly Wagner, Julie Foudy, Cindy Parlow (2)	
October 16	Friendly	Kansas City, Missouri	Mexico	1–0	Angela Hucles	
October 20	Friendly	Chicago, Illinois	Ireland	5–1	Cindy Parlow (3), Abby Wambach, Cat Reddick	
October 23	Friendly	Houston, Texas	Ireland	5–0	Abby Wambach (5)	
November 3	Friendly	East Rutherford, New Jersey	Denmark	1–1	Mia Hamm	
November 6	Friendly	Philadelphia, Pennsylvania	Denmark	1–3	Abby Wambach	
December 8	Friendly	Carson, California	Mexico	5–0	Aly Wagner (2), Abby Wambach (2), Shannon Boxx	

=== 2005 ===
Date	Competition	Location	Opponent	US Scorers	Score	Opposition Scorers	Notes
March 9	Algarve Cup	Estadio da Nora, Ferreiras, Portugal	France	Christie Welsh	1–0	n/a	
March 11	Algarve Cup	Complexo Desportivo Arsenio Catuna, Guia, Portugal	Finland	Christie Welsh (2), Abby Wambach	3–0	n/a	
March 13	Algarve Cup	Estádio Municipal, Vila Real de San Antonio, Portugal	Denmark	Kristine Lilly (2), Abby Wambach, Christie Welsh	4–0	n/a	
March 15	Algarve Cup Final	Estádio Algarve, Faro, Portugal	Germany	Christie Welsh	1–0	n/a	
June 26	Friendly	Virginia Beach SportsPlex, Virginia Beach, Virginia	Canada	Lori Chalupny, Christie Welch	2–0	n/a	
July 10	Friendly	Harry A. Merlo Field, Portland, Oregon	Ukraine	Christie Welsh, Kristine Lilly, Aly Wagner, Danielle Fotopoulos (2)′, Tiffeny Milbrett, Heather O’Reilly	7–0	n/a	
July 24	Friendly	Home Depot Center, Carson, California	Iceland	Danielle Fotopoulos (2), Shannon Boxx	3–0	n/a	
October 16	Friendly	Titan Stadium, Fullerton, California	Australia	n/a	0–0	n/a	
October 23	Friendly	Blackbaud Stadium, Charleston, South Carolina	Mexico	Kristine Lilly, Abby Wambach (2)	3–0	n/a	

=== 2006 ===
Date	Competition	Location	Opponent	US Scorers	Score	Opposition Scorers	Notes
January 18	Four Nations Tournament	Guangdong Olympic Stadium, Guangzhou, China	Norway	Kristine Lilly, Shannon Boxx, Abby Wambach	3–1	Trine Ronning (PK)	
January 20	Four Nations Tournament	Guangdong Olympic Stadium, Guangzhou, China	France	n/a	0–0	n/a	
January 22	Four Nations Tournament	Guangdong Olympic Stadium, Guangzhou, China	China	Kristine Lilly (2)	2–0	n/a	
March 9	Algarve Cup	São Luís Stadium, Faro, Portugal	China	n/a	0–0	n/a	
March 11	Algarve Cup	Municipal Stadium, Quarteira, Portugal	Denmark	Abby Wambach, Heather O’Reilly (2), Kristine Lilly, Natasha Kai	5–0	n/a	
March 13	Algarve Cup	Stadium Algarve, Faro, Portugal	France	Kristine Lilly, Aly Wagner, Lindsay Tarpley, Natasha Kai	4–1	Hoda Lataff	
March 15	Algarve Cup Final	Stadium Algarve, Faro, Portugal	Germany	n/a	0(3)–0(4)	n/a	
May 7	Friendly	KK Wing Stadium, Kumamoto, Japan	Japan	Abby Wambach (3)	3–1	Azusa Iwashimizu	
May 9	Friendly	Nagai Stadium, Osaka, Japan	Japan	Natasha Kai	1–0	n/a	
July 15	Friendly	National Sports Center, Blaine, Minnesota	Sweden	Abby Wambach, Cat Whitehill, Kristine Lilly	3–2	Anna Sjostrom, Elin Elblom	
July 23	Friendly	Torero Stadium, San Diego	Ireland	Heather O’Reilly, Cat Whitehill (2), Abby Wambach, Natasha Kai	5–0	n/a	
July 30	Friendly	SAS Soccer Stadium, Cary, North Carolina	Canada	Abby Wambach (PK), Natasha Kai	2–0	n/a	
August 27	Friendly	Toyota Park, Bridgeview, Illinois	China	Cat Whitehill, Aly Wagner (PK), Kristine Lilly (2)	4–1	Han Duan	
September 13	Friendly	PAETEC Park, Rochester, New York	Mexico	Abby Wambach (2), Lindsay Tarpley	3–1	Mónica Ocampo	
October 1	Friendly	Home Depot Center, Carson, California	Chinese Taipei	Leslie Osborne, Abby Wambach (3), Lindsay Tarpley (2), Kristine Lilly, Carli Lloyd, Megan Rapinoe (2)	10–0	n/a	
October 8	Friendly	University of Richmond Stadium, Richmond, Virginia	Iceland	Abby Wambach (2)	2–1	Margret Lara Vidarsdottir	
October 29	Peace Queen Cup	Gimhae Stadium, Gimhae, South Korea	Denmark	Kristine Lilly	1–1	Camilla Andersen	
October 31	Peace Queen Cup	Cheonan Stadium, Cheonan, South Korea	Australia	Kristine Lily, Natasha Kai	2–0	n/a	
November 2	Peace Queen Cup	Suwon World Cup Stadium, Suwon, South Korea	Netherlands	Lindsay Tarpley, Cat Whitehill	2–0	n/a	
November 4	Peace Queen Cup Final	Seoul World Cup Stadium, Seoul, South Korea	Canada	Kristine Lilly	1–0	n/a	
November 22	Gold Cup Semifinal	Home Depot Center, Carson, California	Mexico	Abby Wambach (2)	2–0	n/a	
November 26	Gold Cup Final	Home Depot Center, Carson, California	Canada	Leslie Osborne, Kristine Lilly (PK)	2–1	Randee Hermus	

=== 2007 ===
Date	Competition	Location	Opponent	US Scorers	Score	Opposition Scorers	Notes
January 26	Four Nations Tournament	Guangdong Olympic Stadium, Guangzhou, China	Germany	n/a	0–0	n/a	
January 28	Four Nations Tournament	Guangdong Olympic Stadium, Guangzhou, China	England	Heather O'Reilly	1–1	Alex Scott	
January 30	Four Nations Tournament	Guangdong Olympic Stadium, Guangzhou, China	China	Lori Chalupny, Natasha Kai	2–0	n/a	
March 7	Algarve Cup	Municipal Stadium, Silves, Portugal	China	Kristine Lilly (PK), Carli Lloyd	2–1	Han Duan	
March 9	Algarve Cup	Estadio da Nora, Ferreiras, Portugal	Finland	Carli Lloyd	1–0	n/a	
March 12	Algarve Cup	Municipal Stadium, Vila Real de San Antonio, Portugal	Sweden	Abby Wambach (2), Carli Lloyd	3–2	Josefine Oqvist, Victoria Svensson	
March 14	Algarve Cup Final	Municipal Stadium, Vila Real de San Antonio, Portugal	Denmark	Kristine Lilly, Carli Lloyd	2–0	n/a	
April 14	Friendly	Gillette Stadium, Foxboro, Massachusetts	Mexico	Abby Wambach, Lindsay Tarpley, Kristine Lilly (2), Lauren Cheney	5–0	n/a	
May 12	Friendly	Pizza Hut Park, Frisco, Texas	Canada	Abby Wambach (2), Lindsay Tarpley, Lori Chalupny, Kristine Lilly, Heather O’Reilly	6–2	Rhian Wilkinson, Christine Sinclai	
June 16	Friendly	Cleveland Browns Stadium, Cleveland, Ohio	China	Abby Wambach (2)	2–0	n/a	
June 23	Friendly	Giants Stadium, East Rutherford, New Jersey	Brazil	Kristine Lilly, Abby Wambach	2–0	n/a	
July 14	Friendly	Rentschler Field, East Hartford, Connecticut	Norway	Carli Lloyd	1–0	n/a	
July 28	Friendly	Spartan Stadium, San Jose, California	Japan	Shannon Boxx, Kristine Lilly, Abby Wambach (PK), Own Goal	4–1	Yuki Nagasato	
August 12	Friendly	Soldier Field, Chicago	New Zealand	Abby Wambach (2), Kristine Lilly, Carli Lloyd (2), Lindsay Tarpley	6–1	Rebecca Smith (PK)	
August 25	Friendly	Home Depot Center, Carson, California	Finland	Shannon Boxx, Kristine Lilly, Lindsay Tarpley, Heather O’Reilly	4–0	n/a	
September 11	Women's World Cup	Chengdu Sports Centre, Chengdu, China	North Korea	Abby Wambach, Heather O’Reilly	2–2	Kil Son Hui, Kim Yong Ae	
September 14	Women's World Cup	Chengdu Sports Centre, Chengdu, China	Sweden	Abby Wambach (2)	2–0	n/a	
September 18	Women's World Cup	Shanghai Hongku Football Stadium, Shanghai, China	Nigeria	Lori Chalupni	1–0	n/a	
September 22	Women's World Cup Quarterfinal	Tianjin Olympic Center Stadium, Tianjin, China	England	Abby Wambach, Shannon Boxx, Kristine Lilly	3–0	n/a	
September 27	Women's World Cup Semifinal	Hangzhou Dragon Stadium, Hangzhou, China	Brazil	n/a	0–4	Own Goal, Marta (2), Cristiane	Biggest defeat in US WNT history
September 30	Women's World Cup 3rd place Match	Shanghai Hongku Football Stadium, Shanghai, China	Norway	Abby Wambach (2), Lori Chalupny, Heather O’Reilly	4–1	Ragnhild Gulbrandsen	
October 13	Friendly	Edward Jones Dome, St. Louis, Missouri	Mexico	Heather O’Reilly, Abby Wambach (2), Kristine Lilly, Carli Lloyd	5–1	Evelyn Lopez	
October 17	Friendly	PGE Park, Portland, OR	Mexico	Kristine Lilly, Abby Wambach, Natasha Kai, Carli Lloyd	4–0	n/a	
October 20	Friendly	University Stadium, Albuquerque, New Mexico	Mexico	Heather O’Reilly	1–1	Mónica Ocampo	

=== 2008 ===
Date	Competition	Location	Opponent	US Scorers	Score	Opposition Scorers	Notes
January 16	Four Nations Tournament	Guangdong Olympic Stadium, Guangzhou, China	Canada	Amy Rodriguez (2), Lindsay Tarpley (2)	4–0	n/a	
January 18	Four Nations Tournament	Guangdong Olympic Stadium, Guangzhou, China	Finland	Lindsay Tarpley (2), Lauren Cheney, Angie Woznuk	4–1	Essi Sainio	
January 20	Four Nations Tournament	Guangdong Olympic Stadium, Guangzhou, China	China	Shannon Box	1–0	n/a	
March 5	Algarve Cup	Municipal Stadium, Albufeira, Portugal	China	Lindsay Tarpley, Tobin Heath, Abby Wambach (2), Carli Lloyd	4–0	n/a	
March 7	Algarve Cup	Restinga Stadium, Alvor, Portugal	Italy	Lindsay Tarpley, Heather O’Reilly	2–0	n/a	
March 10	Algarve Cup	Restinga Stadium, Alvor, Portugal	Norway	Natasha Kai, Abby Wambach, Heather O’Reilly, Amy Rodriguez	4–0	n/a	
March 12	Algarve Cup Final	Municipal Stadium, Vila Real de San Antonio, Portugal	Denmark	Natasha Kai, Abby Wambach	2–1	Cathrine Sorsensen	
April 4	Olympic Qualifying	Estadio Olímpico Benito Juárez, Juarez, Mexico	Jamaica	Carli Lloyd, Lauren Cheney, Abby Wambach (2), Lindsay Tarpley, Tobin Heath	6–0	n/a	
April 6	Olympic Qualifying	Estadio Olímpico Benito Juárez, Juarez, Mexico	Mexico	Natasha Kai (2), Abby Wambach	3–1	Lupita Worbis	
April 9	Olympic Qualifying	Estadio Olímpico Benito Juárez, Juarez, Mexico	Costa Rica	Natasha Kai (2), Heather O’Reilly	3–0	n/a	
April 12	Olympic Qualifying	Estadio Olímpico Benito Juárez, Juarez, Mexico	Canada	Carli Lloyd	1(6)–1(5)	Melissa Tancredi	
April 27	Friendly	WakeMed Soccer Park, Cary, North Carolina	Australia	Natasha Kai, Abby Wambach, Carli Lloyd	3–2	Kate Gill, Cheryl Salisbury	
May 3	Friendly	Legion Field, Birmingham, Alabama	Australia	Lindsay Tarpley (2), Abby Wambach (2), Angela Hucles	5–4	Sarah Walsh, Lauren Colthorpe, Own Goal	
May 10	Friendly	RFK Stadium, Washington, D.C.	Canada	Lindsey Tarpley, Natasha Kai (3), Carli Lloyd, Leslie Osborne	6–0	n/a	
June 15	Peace Queen Cup	Suwon Sports Complex, Suwon, South Korea	Australia	Natasha Kai, Abby Wambach	2–1	Heather Garriock	
June 17	Peace Queen Cup	Suwon Sports Complex, Suwon, South Korea	Brazil	Amy Rodriguez	1–0	n/a	
June 19	Peace Queen Cup	Suwon Sports Complex, Suwon, South Korea	Italy	Abby Wambach (2)	2–0	n/a	
June 21	Peace Queen Cup	Suwon World Cup Stadium, Suwon, South Korea	Canada	Angela Hucles	1–0	n/a	
July 2	Friendly	Fredrikstad Stadium, Fredrikstad, Norway	Norway	Lindsay Tarpley, Carli Lloyd, Angela Hucles, Abby Wambach	4–0	n/a	
July 5	Friendly	Norrvalla Stadium, Skelleftea, Sweden	Sweden	Carli Lloyd	1–0	n/a	
July 13	Friendly	Dick's Sporting Goods Park, Commerce City, Colorado	Brazil	Amy Rodriguez	1–0	n/a	
July 16	Friendly	Torero Stadium, San Diego	Brazil	Natasha Kai	1–0	n/a	
August 6	Olympics	Qinhuangdao Olympic Sports Center Stadium, Qinhaungdao, China	Norway	n/a	0–2	Leni Larsen Kaurin, Melissa Wiik	
August 9	Olympics	Qinhuangdao Olympic Sports Center Stadium, Qinhaungdao, China	Japan	Carli Lloyd	1–0	n/a	
August 12	Olympics	Shenyang Olympic Stadium, Shenyang, China	New Zealand	Heather O’Reilly, Amy Rodriguez, Lindsay Tarpley, Angela Hucles	4–0	n/a	
August 15	Olympics Quarterfinal	Shanghai Stadium, Shanghai, China	Canada	Angela Hucles, Natasha Kai	2–1	Christine Sinclair	
August 18	Olympics Semifinal	Worker's Stadium, Beijing, China	Japan	Angela Hucles (2), Lori Chalupny, Heather O’Reilly	4–2	Shinobu Ohno, Eriko Arakawa	
August 21	Olympics Final	Worker's Stadium, Beijing, China	Brazil	Carli Lloyd	1–0	n/a	
September 13	Friendly	Lincoln Financial Field, Philadelphia	Ireland	Natasha Kai, Heather O’Reilly	2–0	n/a	
September 17	Friendly	Giants Stadium, East Rutherford, New Jersey	Ireland	Natasha Kai	1–0	n/a	
September 20	Friendly	Toyota Park, Bridgeview, Illinois	Ireland	Lori Chalupny, Kate Markgraf (PK)	2–0	n/a	
November 1	Friendly	University of Richmond Stadium, Richmond, Virginia	Korea	Angela Hucles, Heather O’Reilly, Lindsay Tarpley	3–1	Han Song I	
November 5	Friendly	Paul Brown Stadium, Cincinnati	Korea	n/a	0–0	n/a	
November 8	Friendly	Raymond James Stadium, Tampa, Florida	Korea	Heather O'Reilly	1–0	n/a	
December 13	Friendly	Home Depot Center, Carson, California	China	Tina Ellertson	1–0	n/a	
December 17	Friendly	Ford Field, Detroit	China	Heather O'Reilly	1–0	n/a	

=== 2009 ===
Date	Competition	Location	Opponent	US Scorers	Score	Opposition Scorers	Notes
March 4	Algarve Cup	Municipal Stadium, Lagos, Portugal	Denmark	Angie Woznuk, Tina DiMartino	2–0	n/a	
March 6	Algarve Cup	Parque Desportiva da Nora, Ferreiras, Portugal	Iceland	Natasha Kai	1–0	n/a	
March 9	Algarve Cup	Parque Desportiva da Nora, Ferreiras, Portugal	Norway	Megan Rapinoe	1–0	n/a	
March 11	Algarve Cup	Estadio Algarve, Faro, Portugal	Sweden	Megan Rapinoe	1(3)–1(4)	Lotta Schelin	
May 25	Friendly	BMO Field, Toronto, Canada	Canada	Shannon Boxx, Megan Rapinoe, Lindsay Tarpley, Lauren Cheney	4–0	n/a	
July 19	Friendly	Marina Auto Stadium, Rochester, New York	Canada	Abby Wambach	1–0	n/a	
July 22	Friendly	Blackbaud Stadium, Charleston, South Carolina	Canada	Christie Nairn	1–0	n/a	
October 29	Friendly	Impuls Arena, Augsburg, Germany	Germany	Abby Wambach	1–0	n/a	

== 2010s ==
=== 2010 ===
February 24 Algarve Cup	United States	2–0	Iceland	Vila Real de Santo António, Portugal
15:00 WEST	Whitehill (yellow card) 29'; Atladóttir 60' (o.g.); Cheney 61'; Buehler (yellow card) 90+3'	Report		Stadium: Municipal Stadium; Attendance: 250; Referee: Christine Beck (Germany)

February 26 Algarve Cup	Norway	1–2	United States	Olhão, Portugal
15:00 WEST	Christensen (yellow card) 11'; Herlovsen 63'	Report	Wambach 13', 90+2'; Lloyd (yellow card) 76'	Stadium: Estádio José Arcanjo; Attendance: 300; Referee: Sung Mi Cha (South Korea)

March 1 Algarve Cup	United States	2–0	Sweden	Ferreiras, Portugal
15:00 WEST	Cheney 56', 87'	Report		Stadium: Estadio da Nora; Attendance: 500; Referee: Efthalia Mitsi (Greece)

March 3 Algarve Cup Final	Germany	2–3	United States	Faro, Portugal
16:00 WEST	Grings 40', 74'	Report	Lloyd 18', (yellow card) 46'; Wambach 22'; Mitts (yellow card) 41'; Cheney 69'	Stadium: Estadio Algarve; Attendance: 1,200; Referee: Kirsi Heikkinen (Finland)

March 28 Friendly	United States	3–0	Mexico	San Diego, CA
14:00 PT	Rodriguez 12'; Boxx 43'; Wambach (yellow card) 71'; Cheney 72'	Report		Stadium: Torero Stadium; Attendance: 3,069; Referee: Kari Seitz (United States)

March 31 Friendly	United States	1–0	Mexico	Sandy, Utah
19:00 MT	Wambach 60'; Lloyd (yellow card) 71'	Report		Stadium: Rio Tinto Stadium; Attendance: 3,732; Referee: Jennifer Bennett (United States)

May 22 Friendly	United States	4–0	Germany	Cleveland, OH
18:00 ET	Wambach 29' (pen.), 63', (yellow card) 44'	Report	Prinz (yellow card) 42'; Popp (yellow card) 89'	Stadium: Cleveland Browns Stadium; Attendance: 10,321; Referee: Margaret Domka (United States)

July 13 Friendly	United States	1–1	Sweden	Omaha, Nebraska
20:00 CT	Rodriguez 44'	Report	Forsberg 57'	Stadium: Morrison Stadium; Attendance: 6,439; Referee: Felisha Mariscal (United States)

July 17 Friendly	United States	3–0	Sweden	East Hartford, Connecticut
19:30 CT	Rapinoe 33'; Wambach 45', 72'	Report	Levenstad (yellow card) 34'	Stadium: Rentschler Field; Attendance: 5,087; Referee: Michelle Cowman (United States)

October 2 Friendly	United States	2–1	China	Kennesaw, GA
18:00 ET	Rapinoe 21'; O'Reilly 39'	Report	Shanshan 33'	Stadium: Kennesaw State University Soccer Stadium; Attendance: 4,759; Referee: Meredith Hackett (United States)

October 6 Friendly	United States	1–1	China	Chester, Pennsylvania
19:00 ET	Morgan 83'	Report	Jun 37'; Na (yellow card) 45+1'; Fan (yellow card) 65'; Gaoping (yellow card) 80'	Stadium: PPL Park; Attendance: 2,505; Referee: Margaret Domka (United States)

October 28 World Cup Qualifying	United States	5–0	Haiti	Cancún, Mexico
19:30 CDT	Buehler 9'; Wambach 15', 45', 62'; Rodriguez 40'	Report	Marseille (yellow card) 28'; Jean-Pierre (yellow card) 81'	Stadium: Estadio Andrés Quintana Roo; Attendance: 2,500; Referee: Carol Anne Chenard (Canada)

October 30 World Cup Qualifying	United States	9–0	Guatemala	Cancún, Mexico
19:30 CDT	Rodriguez 45', 89'; Rapinoe 22', 40', 70'; Wambach 29', 30'; Morgan 49'; Lloyd 58' (pen.)	Report	Ramos (yellow card) 54'	Stadium: Estadio Andrés Quintana Roo; Attendance: 1,050; Referee: Shane De Silva (Trinidad and Tobago)

November 1 World Cup Qualifying	United States	4–0	Costa Rica	Cancún, Mexico
19:30 CST	Wambach 32' (pen.); Cheney (yellow card) 60', (goal) 69'; Averbuch 73'; Morgan 81'	Report	Cruz (yellow card) 31'	Stadium: Estadio Andrés Quintana Roo; Attendance: 502; Referee: Lucila Venegas (Mexico)

November 5 World Cup Qualifying Semifinal	United States	1–2	Mexico	Cancún, Mexico
20:00 CST	Lloyd 25'; Rapinoe (yellow card) 61'; Boxx (yellow card) 79'; Rampone (yellow card) 90'	Report	Dominguez 3'; Pérez 27'; Robles (yellow card) 42'	Stadium: Estadio de Béisbol Beto Ávila; Attendance: 8,374; Referee: Dianne Ferreira (Guyana)

November 8 World Cup Qualifying 3rd place match	Costa Rica	0–3	United States	Cancún, Mexico
17:00 CT		Report	Cheney 17'; Wambach 33', 50', (yellow card) 65'; LePeilbet (yellow card) 39'; Averbuch (yellow card) 73'; Lindsey (yellow card) 80'	Stadium: Estadio Andrés Quintana Roo; Attendance: 2,806; Referee: Quetzalli Alvarad (Mexico)

November 20 World Cup Qualifying Playoff	Italy	0–1	United States	Padua, Italy
16:30 CEST	Carissimi (yellow card) 51'; Domenichetti (yellow card) 83'	Report	Lindsey (yellow card) 88'; Morgan 90+4'	Stadium: Stadio Euganeo; Attendance: 5,000; Referee: Silvia Elisabeth Reyes Juarez (Peru)

November 27 World Cup Qualifying Playoff	United States	1–0	Italy	Bridgeview, Illinois
13:00 CST	Rodriguez 40'			Stadium: Toyota Park; Attendance: 9,508; Referee: Cha Sung Mi (South Korea)

=== 2011 ===
January 21 Four Nations Tournament	Sweden	2–1	United States	Yongchuan, China
15:35 CST	Segersröm 16'; Asllani 61'	Report	Lloyd 11'	Stadium: Yongchuan Sports Center; Attendance: 16,000; Referee: Qin Liang (China)

January 23 Four Nations Tournament	United States	2–1	Canada	Yongchuan, China
19:05 CST	Cheney 54', (yellow card) 90+4'; Tarpley 70'	Report	Tancredi 56'; Chapman (yellow card) 61'; Moscato (yellow card) 85'	Stadium: Yongchuan Sports Center; Attendance: 7,000; Referee: He Jin (China)

January 25 Four Nations Tournament	China	0–2	United States	Yongchuan, China
18:35 CST	Huana (yellow card) 26'	Report	Lloyd 31'; O'Reilly (yellow card) 58'; Rodriguez 67'	Stadium: Yongchuan Sports Center; Attendance: 12,000; Referee: Wang Jia (China)

March 2 Algarve Cup	United States	2–1	Japan	Vila Real de Santo António, Portugal
15:00 WEST	Rodriguez 7'; Rapinoe 18'	Report	Miyama 29'	Stadium: Municipal Stadium; Attendance: 350; Referee: Dagmar Damkova (Czech Republic)

March 4 Algarve Cup	United States	2–0	Norway	Vila Real de Santo António, Portugal
15:00 WEST	Tarpley 33'; Lloyd 63'	Report	Mienna (yellow card) 45'	Stadium: Municipal Stadium; Attendance: 400; Referee: Eun Ah Hong (South Korea)

March 7 Algarve Cup	United States	4–0	Finland	Quarteira, Portugal
15:00 WEST	Boxx 8'; Lloyd 13'; Morgan 45', 54'; Wambach (yellow card) 79'	Report		Stadium: Municipal Stadium; Attendance: 250; Referee: Jacqui Melksham (Australia)

March 9 Algarve Cup Final	Iceland	2–4	United States	Faro, Portugal
17:00 WEST	Viðarsdóttir 26'; Gísladóttir 28'	Report	Lloyd 10', (yellow card) 89'; Cheney 45+1'; O'Reilly 55'; Morgan 87'	Stadium: Estadio Algarve; Attendance: 1,500; Referee: Bibiana Steinhaus (Germany)

April 2 Friendly	England	2–1	United States	Leyton, London, England
20:00 BST	Clarke 8'; Yankey 26'	Report	Rapinoe 39'	Stadium: Matchroom Stadium; Attendance: 5,801; Referee: Sian Massey (England)

May 14 Friendly	United States	2–0	Japan	Columbus, Ohio
18:30 ET	Wambach 29'; Rodriguez 37'	Report		Stadium: Columbus Crew Stadium; Attendance: 5,234; Referee: Kari Seitz (United States)

May 18 Friendly	United States	2–0	Japan	Cary, North Carolina
19:00 ET	Rodriguez 28'; O'Reilly 69'	Report		Stadium: WakeMed Soccer Park; Attendance: 5,323; Referee: Moo Hackett (United States)

June 5 Friendly	United States	1–0	Mexico	Harrison, New Jersey
14:00 ET	Cheney 90+2'	Report		Stadium: Red Bull Arena; Attendance: 5,852; Referee: Kari Seitz (United States)

June 28 World Cup	United States	2–0	North Korea	Dresden, Germany
18:15 CEDT	Cheney 54'; Buehler 76'	Report		Stadium: Rudolf-Harbig-Stadion; Attendance: 21,859; Referee: Bibiana Steinhaus (Germany)

July 2 World Cup	United States	3–0	Colombia	Sinsheim, Germany
18:00 CEDT	O'Reilly 12'; Rapinoe 50'; Lloyd 57'; Wambach (yellow card) 87'	Report		Stadium: Rhein-Neckar-Arena; Attendance: 25,475; Referee: Dagmar Damkova (Czech Republic)

July 6 World Cup	Sweden	2–1	United States	Wolfsburg, Germany
20:45 CEDT	Dahlkvist 16' (pen.); Fischer 35', (yellow card) 60'	Report	LePeilbet (yellow card) 14'; Wambach 67'	Stadium: Volkswagen Arena; Attendance: 23,468; Referee: Etsuko Fukano (Japan)

July 10 World Cup Quarterfinal	Brazil	2–2 (a.e.t.) (3–5 p)	United States	Dresden, Germany
17:30 CEDT	Aline (yellow card) 44'; Marta (yellow card) 45', (goal) 68' (pen.), 92'; Maurine (yellow card) 112'; Érika (yellow card) 117'	Report	Daiane 2' (o.g.); Lloyd (yellow card) 29'; Buehler (red card) 65'; Solo (yellow card) 67'; Rapinoe (yellow card) 90+1'; Boxx (yellow card) 113'; Wambach 120+2'	Stadium: Rudolf-Harbig-Stadion; Attendance: 25,598; Referee: Jacqui Melksham (Australia)
	Penalties
	Cristiane (penalty scored); Marta (penalty scored); Daiane (penalty missed); Francielle (penalty scored)		(penalty scored) Boxx; (penalty scored) Lloyd; (penalty scored) Wambach; (penalty scored) Rapinoe; (penalty scored) Krieger

July 13 World Cup Semifinal	France	1–3	United States	Mönchengladbach, Germany
18:00 CEDT	Bompastor 55'; Thomis (yellow card) 90'	Report	Cheney 9'; Wambach 79'; Morgan 82'	Stadium: Borussia Park; Attendance: 25,676; Referee: Kirsi Heikkinen (Finland)

July 17 World Cup Final	Japan	2–2 (a.e.t.) (3–1 p)	United States	Frankfurt, Germany
18:00 CEDT	Miyama 80', (yellow card) 97'; Sawa 117'; Iwashimizu (red card) 120'	Report	Morgan 69'; Wambach 104'	Stadium: Commerzbank-Arena; Attendance: 48,817; Referee: Bibiana Steinhaus (Germany)
	Penalties
	Miyama (penalty scored); Nagasato (penalty missed); Sakaguchi (penalty scored); Kumagai (penalty scored)		(penalty missed) Boxx; (penalty missed) Lloyd; (penalty missed) Heath; (penalty scored) Wambach

September 17 Friendly	United States	1–1	Canada	Kansas City, Kansas
18:00 CDT	Wambach 10' (pen.)	Report	Matheson (yellow card) 18'; Tancredi 42'; Kyle (yellow card) 64'	Stadium: Livestrong Sporting Park; Attendance: 16,191; Referee: Margaret Domka (United States)

September 22 Friendly	United States	3–0	Canada	Portland, Oregon
20:00 PT	Wambach 63', 70'; Morgan 90+2'	Report		Stadium: Jeld-Wen Field; Attendance: 18,570; Referee: Christina Ibanez (United States)

November 19 Friendly	United States	1–1	Sweden	Phoenix, Arizona
19:00 MT	Heath 81'	Report	Jakobsson 28', (yellow card) 33'	Stadium: University of Phoenix Stadium; Attendance: 18,482; Referee: Kari Seitz (United States)

=== 2012 ===
January 20 Olympic Qualifying	Dominican Republic	0–14	United States	Vancouver, Canada
19:30 PT		Report	Wambach 1', 19'; Lloyd 4'; Buehler 7'; O'Reilly 17', 32', 78'; Heath 30'; Rodriguez 47', 50', 58', 71', 75'; Cheney 64'	Stadium: BC Place; Attendance: 6,321; Referee: Cardella Samuels (Jamaica)

January 22 Olympic Qualifying	United States	13–0	Guatemala	Vancouver, Canada
16:30 PST	Wambach 12', 14'; Cheney 24'; Rodrigueuz 29'; Llyd 33'; Lindsey 34'; Leroux 48', 51', 57', 70', 87'; Rapinoe 75'; Morgan 83'	Report		Stadium: BC Place; Attendance: 6,259; Referee: Irazema Aguilera (Cuba)

January 24 Olympic Qualifying	United States	4–0	Mexico	Vancouver, Canada
14:00 PST	Lloyd 8', 57', 86'; O'Reilly 9'	Report		Stadium: BC Place; Attendance: 7,599; Referee: Carol Anne Chenard (Canada)

January 27 Olympic Qualifying	United States	3–0	Costa Rica	Vancouver, Canada
17:00 PST	Heath 16'; Lloyd 72'; Morgan 89'	Report	F. Sánchez (yellow card) 4'	Stadium: BC Place; Attendance: 10,000; Referee: Irazema Aguilera (Cuba)

January 29 Olympic Qualifying	Canada	0–4	United States	Vancouver, Canada
17:00 PST	Kyle (yellow card) 32'	Report	Morgan 4', 56'; Wambach 24', 28'	Stadium: BC Place; Attendance: 25,427; Referee: Quetzalli Alvarado (Mexico)

February 11 Friendly	United States	2–1	New Zealand	Frisco, Texas
15:00 CT	Boxx (yellow card) 78'; Morgan 88', 90+3'	Report	Wilkinson 49'	Stadium: FC Dallas Stadium; Attendance: 20,677; Referee: Moo Hackett (United States)

February 29 Algarve Cup	United States	5–0	Denmark	Lagos, Portugal
17:00 WEST	Morgan 21', 84'; Wambach 44'; Lloyd 76'; Leroux 90+3'	Report		Stadium: Municipal Stadium; Attendance: 300; Referee: Liang Qin (China)

March 2 Algarve Cup	United States	2–1	Norway	Lagos, Portugal
15:00 WEST	Wambach 51'; Leroux 81'	Report	Thorsnes 90+3'	Stadium: Municipal Stadium; Attendance: 300; Referee: Jesica Salom Di Iorio (Argentina)

March 5 Algarve Cup	Japan	1–0	United States	Faro, Portugal
14:10 WEST	Takase 84'			Stadium: Estádio Algarve; Attendance: 1,000; Referee: Pernill Larsson (Sweden)

March 7 Algarve Cup 3rd place Match	Sweden	0–4	United States	Parchal, Portugal
11:00 WEST		Report	Morgan 4', 33', 72'; Wambach 36'	Stadium: Municipal Stadium; Attendance: 400; Referee: Morag Pirie (Scotland)

April 1 Kirin Challenge Cup	Japan	1–1	United States	Sendai, Japan
19:30 JST	Kinga 32'	Report	Morgan 73'	Stadium: Yurtec Stadium Sendai; Attendance: 15,159; Referee: Li Juan (China)

April 3 Kirin Challenge Cup	United States	3–0	Brazil	Chiba, Japan
16:00 JST	Lloyd 18'; Boxx 23'; Buehler (yellow card) 77'; Rodriguez 83'	Report	Ester (yellow card) 82'	Stadium: Fukuda Denshi Arena; Attendance: 500; Referee: Sachiko Yamagishi (Japan)

May 27 Friendly	United States	4–1	China	Chester, Pennsylvania
19:00 ET	Morgan 34', 50'; Gaoping 36' (o.g.); Wambach 83'; Leroux (yellow card) 90+1'	Report	Guixin (yellow card) 18'; Rui 22'	Stadium: PPL Park; Attendance: 18,573; Referee: Margaret Domka (United States)

June 16 2012 Sweden Invitational	Sweden	1–3	United States	Halmstad, Sweden
16:00 CEST	Schelin 35'	Report	Wambach 8'; Morgan 22'; Heath 56'	Stadium: Örjans Vall; Attendance: 2,751; Referee: Teodora Albon (Romania)

June 18 2012 Sweden Invitational	United States	4–1	Japan	Halmstad, Sweden
13:00 CEST	Morgan 3', 61'; Wambach 10', 90+2'; Buehler (yellow card) 24'	Report	Nagasato 28'	Stadium: Örjans Vall; Attendance: 1,309; Referee: Linn Andersson (Sweden)

June 30 Friendly	United States	2–1	Canada	Sandy, Utah
12:00 MT	Moscato 15' (o.g.); O'Hara (yellow card) 29'; Boxx (yellow card) 31'; Rodriguez 85'	Report	Tancredi 57'; Kyle (yellow card) 61'; Chapman (yellow card) 67'	Stadium: Rio Tinto Stadium; Attendance: 16,805; Referee: Kari Seitz (United States)

July 25 Olympics	United States	4–2	France	Glasgow, Scotland
17:00 BST	Wambach 19'; Morgan 32', 66'; Lloyd 56'	Report	Thiney 12'; Delie 14'	Stadium: Hampden Park; Attendance: 18,090; Referee: Sachiko Yamagishi (Japan)

July 28 Olympics	United States	3–0	Colombia	Glasgow, Scotland
17:00	Rapinoe 33'; Wambach 74'; Lloyd 77'	Report		Stadium: Hampden Park; Attendance: 11,313; Referee: Efthalia Mitsi (Greece)

July 31 Olympics	United States	1–0	North Korea	Manchester, England
17:15 BST	Cheney (yellow card) 16'; Wambach 25'	Report	R. Gyong (yellow card) 13'; Hui (yellow card) 43'; C. Gyong (yellow card) 77' (yellow-red card) 81'	Stadium: Old Trafford; Attendance: 29,522; Referee: Jenny Palmqvist (Sweden)

August 3 Olympic Quarterfinal	United States	2–0	New Zealand	Newcastle, England
14:30 BST	Wambach 27', (yellow card) 43'; Lloyd (yellow card) 79'; Leroux 87'	Report		Stadium: St James' Park; Attendance: 10,441; Referee: Jesica Di Iorio (Argentina)

August 6 Olympic Semifinal	Canada	3–4 (a.e.t.)	United States	Manchester, England
19:45 BST	Sinclair 22', 67', 73'; Scott (yellow card) 60'; Tancredi (yellow card) 79'	Report	Rapinoe 54', 70'; Wambach 80' (pen.); Morgan 120+3'	Stadium: Old Trafford; Attendance: 26,630; Referee: Christina Pedersen (Norway)

August 9 Olympic Final	United States	2–1	Japan	Wembley, London, England
19:45 BST	Lloyd 8', 54'	Report	Ogimi 63'	Stadium: Wembley Stadium; Attendance: 80,203; Referee: Bibiana Steinhaus (Germany)

September 1 Friendly	United States	8–0	Costa Rica	Rochester, NY
14:30 ET	Rapinoe 13', 45'; Wambach 24', 32'; Morgan 38'; Leroux 77'; Lloyd 84'; O'Reilly 89'	Report		Stadium: Sahlen's Stadium; Attendance: 13,206; Referee: Christina Ibanez (United States)

September 16 Friendly	United States	2–1	Australia	Carson, California
12:51 PT	Morgan 55'; Boxx 63' (pen.)	Report	de Vanna 34'	Stadium: Home Depot Center; Attendance: 19,851; Referee: Kari Seitz (United States)

September 19 Friendly	United States	6–2	Australia	Commerce City, Colorado
20:13 MT	O'Reilly 25'; Morgan 43', 63'; Wambach 53'; Boxx 69'; Leroux 82'	Report	de Vanna 32'; Walsh 34'	Stadium: Dick's Sporting Goods Park; Attendance: 18,589; Referee: Kristin Schiereck (United States)

October 20 Friendly	United States	1–1	Germany	Bridgeview, Illinois
18:06 CT	Wambach 2'	Report	Mittag 14'	Stadium: Toyota Park; Attendance: 19,522; Referee: Margaret Domka (United States)
Note: First match with Jill Ellis as head coach.

October 23 Friendly	United States	2–2	Germany	East Hartford, Connecticut
19:30 ET	Wambach 44'; Heath 67'; Mitts (yellow card) 74'	Report	Marozsán 48', 85'; Goeßling (yellow card) 55'	Stadium: Rentschler Field; Attendance: 18,870; Referee: Carol Anne Chenard (Canada)

November 28 Friendly	United States	5–0	Republic of Ireland	Portland, Oregon
19:00 PT	Morgan 24', 34', 44'; Leroux 62', 81'	Report		Stadium: Jeld-Wen Field; Attendance: 10,092; Referee: Katja Koroleva (United States)

December 1 Friendly	United States	2–0	Republic of Ireland	Glendale, Arizona
19:30 MT	Morgan 1'; Rapinoe 38'	Report	Perry (yellow card) 81'; Fahey (yellow card) 88'	Stadium: University of Phoenix Stadium; Attendance: 11,570; Referee: Kristen Schiereck (United States)

December 8 Friendly	United States	2–0	China	Detroit, MI
13:30	Lloyd 50'; Leroux 84'	Report	Rui (yellow card) 20'; Jiayue (yellow card) 79'	Stadium: Ford Field; Attendance: 17,371; Referee: Margaret Domka (United States)

December 12 Friendly	United States	4–0	China	Houston, TX
19:30 CT	Wambach 20', 63', 85'; Lloyd 62'	Report	Haiyan (yellow card) 39'; Ying (yellow card) 53'; Wei (yellow card) 57'	Stadium: BBVA Stadium; Attendance: 15,643; Referee: Kristen Schiereck (United States)

December 15 Friendly	United States	4–1	China	Boca Raton, Florida
19:00 ET	Wambach 18', 64'; Rapinoe 36'; Leroux 87'	Report	Peng 45'	Stadium: FAU Stadium; Attendance: 10,493; Referee: Christina Ibanez (United States)

=== 2013 ===
February 9 Friendly	United States	4–1	Scotland	Jacksonville, Florida
17:00 ET	Press 13', 32'; Boxx 52'; Leroux 89'	Report	Love (yellow card) 39'; Little 54'; Jones (yellow card) 80'	Stadium: Everbank Field; Attendance: 18,656; Referee: Margaret Domka (United States)

February 13 Friendly	United States	3–1	Scotland	Nashville, Tennessee
19:00 CT	Rapinoe 21'; Wambach 51'; Press 54'	Report	Grant 81'	Stadium: LP Field; Attendance: 14,224; Referee: Katja Koroleva (United States)

March 6 Algarve Cup	United States	3–0	Iceland	Albufeira, Portugal
14:00 WEST	Buehler 48'; Boxx 62'; Wambach 74'	Report		Stadium: Municipal Stadium; Attendance: 500; Referee: Fusako Kajiyama (Japan)

March 8 Algarve Cup	United States	5–0	China	Albufeira, Portugal
14:00 WEST	Leroux 14'; Krieger 32'; Rapinoe 46'; Press 64'; Engen 84'	Report	Lisi (yellow card) 39'; Shuang (yellow card) 54'; Ying (yellow card) 57'	Stadium: Municipal Stadium; Attendance: 500; Referee: Jana Adamkova (Czech Republic)

March 11 Algarve Cup	Sweden	1–1	United States	Lagos, Portugal
15:00 WEST	Dahlkvist 4'; Nilsson (yellow card) 52'	Report	Morgan 56'	Stadium: Municipal Stadium; Attendance: 750; Referee: Esther Staubli (Switzerland)

March 13 Algarve Cup Final	Germany	0–2	United States	Faro, Portugal
17:00 WEST		Report	Morgan 13', 33'; Leroux (yellow card) 23'	Stadium: Estádio Algarve; Attendance: 1,200; Referee: Carol Anne Chenard (Canada)

April 5 Friendly	Germany	3–3	United States	Offenbach am Main, Germany
18:15 CEST	Kulig 63'; Šašić 85' (pen.); Mittag 86'	Report	Wambach 47'; Boxx (yellow card) 50'; Rapinoe 55'; Morgan 71'; Rampone (yellow card) 84'	Stadium: Sparda-Bank-Hessen-Stadion; Attendance: 16,090; Referee: Christina Pederson (Norway)

April 9 Friendly	Netherlands	1–3	United States	The Hague, Netherlands
19:00 CEST	Hoogendijk (yellow card) 72'; Melis 81'	Report	Heath 36'; Press 45', 60'	Stadium: Kyocera Stadium; Attendance: 8,000; Referee: Christine Baitinger (Germany)

June 2 Friendly	Canada	0–3	United States	Toronto, Canada
16:30 ET		Report	Morgan 70', 72'; Leroux 90+3'	Stadium: BMO Field; Attendance: 22,453; Referee: Quetzalli Alvarado (Mexico)

June 15 Friendly	United States	4–1	South Korea	Foxborough, Massachusetts
19:00 ET	Mewis 3'; Cheney 7'; Lloyd 57'; Wambach 90+3'	Report	So-hyun 26'	Stadium: Gillette Stadium; Attendance: 13,035; Referee: Kari Seitz (United States)

June 20 Friendly	United States	5–0	South Korea	Harrison, New Jersey
19:30 ET	Wambach 10', 19', 29', 45+1'; Cheney 64'	Report		Stadium: New Jersey; Attendance: 18,961; Referee: Margaret Domka (United States)

September 3 Friendly	United States	7–0	Mexico	Washington, D.C.
20:00 ET	Wambach 11'; Leroux 21', 22', 30', 41'; Buehler 55'; Brian 72'	Report		Stadium: RFK Stadium; Attendance: 12,594; Referee: Gillian Martindale (Barbados)

October 20 Friendly	United States	4–0	Australia	San Antonio, TX
12:30 CT	Holiday 9'; Lloyd 14'; Wambach 56'; Press 90+1'	Report		Stadium: Alamodome; Attendance: 19,109; Referee: Kari Seitz (United States)

October 27 Friendly	United States	4–1	New Zealand	San Francisco, CA
15:30 PT	Rapinoe 7'; Lloyd 12'; Press 42'; O'Reilly 87'	Report	Wilkinson 54'	Stadium: Candlestick Park; Attendance: 16,315; Referee: Carol-Anne Chenard (Canada)

October 30 Friendly	United States	1–1	New Zealand	Columbus, Ohio
19:30 ET	Krieger (yellow card) 23'; Leroux 42'	Report	Percival (yellow card) 72'; Wilkinson 87'	Stadium: Columbus Crew Stadium; Attendance: 15,139; Referee: Sabina Charles-Kirton (Saint Lucia)

November 10 Friendly	United States	4–1	Brazil	Orlando, FL
15:30 ET	Leroux 15'; Wambach 17'; Leroux 36'; Tymrak 76'; Lloyd (yellow card) 79' (yellow-red card) 90+2'	Report	Rosana 25'	Stadium: Citrus Bowl; Attendance: 20,274; Referee: Margaret Domka (United States)

=== 2014 ===
January 31 Friendly	United States	1–0	Canada	Dallas, TX
20:00 CT	Leroux 78'	Report	Bélanger (yellow card) 29'; Buchanan (yellow card) 33'; Sesselmann (yellow card) 38'	Stadium: Toyota Stadium; Attendance: 20,862; Referee: Mirian León (El Salvador)

February 8 Friendly	United States	7–0	Russia	Boca Raton, Florida
15:30 ET	Lloyd 29', 37'; O'Reilly 32'; Press 51', 59'; Leroux 54'; Wambach 67'	Report	Orlova (red card) 68'; Dmitrenko (yellow card) 70'	Stadium: FAU Stadium; Attendance: 8,857; Referee: Marie-Soleil Beaudoin (Canada)

February 13 Friendly	United States	8–0	Russia	Atlanta, GA
19:30 ET	Terekhova 11' (o.g.); Orlova 50' (o.g.); Rodriguez 52'; Wambach 54'; Rapinoe 65'; Holiday 81' (pen.); O'Reilly 83'; Press 86'	Report		Stadium: Georgia Dome; Attendance: 16,133; Referee: Melissa Paola Borjas Pastrana (Honduras)

March 5 Algarve Cup	Japan	1–1	United States	Parchal, Portugal
12:45 WEST	Miyama 83'; Utsugi (yellow card) 87'	Report	Leroux 59'	Stadium: Belavista Municipal Stadium; Attendance: 500; Referee: Efthalia Mitsi (Greece)

March 7 Algarve Cup	Sweden	1–0	United States	Albufeira, Portugal
13:30 WEST	Schelin 24'	Report		Stadium: Municipal Stadium; Attendance: 2,000; Referee: Yemi Martinez (Colombia)

March 10 Algarve Cup	United States	3–5	Denmark	Albufeira, Portugal
14:40 CEST	Press 51'; Leroux 63'; Rapinoe 68'; Lloyd (yellow card) 87'	Report	Veje 24'; Nadim 35'; Sørensen 39'; Rasmussen 62', (yellow card) 84'; Nielsen 90+3'	Stadium: Municipal Stadium; Attendance: 750; Referee: Riem Hussein (Germany)

March 12 Algarve Cup 7th place match	North Korea	0–3	United States	Parchal, Portugal
11:00 WEST		Report	Wambach 11', 58'; O'Reilly 88'	Stadium: Belavista Municipal Stadium; Attendance: 250; Referee: Stephanie Frappart (France)

April 6 Friendly	United States	2–0	China	Commerce City, Colorado
15:00 MT	Holiday 39'; Rapinoe 78'	Report	Shanshan (yellow card) 90'	Stadium: Dick's Sporting Goods Park; Attendance: 14,903; Referee: Christina Unkel (United States)

April 10 Friendly	United States	3–0	China	San Diego, CA
20:00 PT	Lloyd 20', 23'; Leroux 46'	Report	Ying (yellow card) 59'	Stadium: Qualcomm Stadium; Attendance: 12,857; Referee: Katja Koroleva (United States)

May 8 Friendly	Canada	1–1	United States	Winnipeg, Canada
19:00 CT	Buchanan 35'	Report	Leroux 78'	Stadium: Investors Group Field; Attendance: 28,255; Referee: Melissa Pastrana (Honduras)

June 14 Friendly	United States	1–0	France	Tampa, Florida
19:30 ET	Leroux 21'; Cox (yellow card) 68'; Solo (yellow card) 83'; Press (yellow card) 90'	Report	Le Sommer (yellow card) 59'	Stadium: Raymond James Stadium; Attendance: 9,799; Referee: Christina Unkel (United States)

June 19 Friendly	United States	2–2	France	East Hartford, Connecticut
19:30 ET	Morgan 56', 85'	Report	Necib 27'; Henry 68'	Stadium: Rentschler Field; Attendance: 14,695; Referee: Quetzalli Alvarado (Mexico)

August 20 Friendly	United States	4–1	Switzerland	Cary, North Carolina
19:30 ET	Rapinoe 3'; Lloyd 56' (pen.), (yellow card) 85'; Press 77'; Wambach 87' (pen.)	Report	Kiwic (yellow card) 19'; Wälti (yellow card) 45+1'; Abbé (yellow card) 58'; Crnogorčević 71' (pen.)	Stadium: WakeMed Soccer Park; Attendance: 9,992; Referee: Katja Koroleva (United States)

September 13 Friendly	United States	8–0	Mexico	Sandy, Utah
19:30 MT	Garciamendez 12' (o.g.); Wambach 23', 41'; Morgan 36', 56'; Engen 58'; Holiday (yellow card) 64'; Leroux 71'; O'Reilly 75'	Report		Stadium: Rio Tinto Stadium; Attendance: 8,849; Referee: Vilma Montez (El Salvador)

September 18 Friendly	United States	4–0	Mexico	Rochester, NY
19:00 ET	Rodriguez 9'; Rapinoe 37'; Heath 44'; Morgan 79'	Report	Mayor (yellow card) 72'	Stadium: Sahlen's Stadium; Attendance: 5,680; Referee: Marie-Soleil Beauboin (Canada)

October 15 CONCACAF Championship	United States	1–0	Trinidad and Tobago	Kansas City, Kansas
19:30 CT	Wambach 54'	Report	Atthin-Johnson (yellow card) 16'	Stadium: Sporting Park; Attendance: 3,621; Referee: Marianela Araya (Costa Rica)

October 17 CONCACAF Championship	United States	5–0	Guatemala	Bridgeview, Illinois
20:00 CT	Heath 7', 57'; Lloyd 46'; Leroux (yellow card) 49'; Engen 58'; Rapinoe 66'	Report		Stadium: Toyota Park; Attendance: 6,796; Referee: Maurees Skeete (Guyana)

October 20 CONCACAF Championship	Haiti	0–6	United States	Washington, D.C.
19:30 ET		Report	Lloyd 9'; Wambach 38', 61'; Klingenberg 57'; Press 65'; Brian 82'	Stadium: RFK Stadium; Attendance: 6,421; Referee: Quetzali Alvarado (Mexico)

October 24 CONCACAF Championship Semifinal	United States	3–0	Mexico	Chester, Pennsylvania
19:30 ET	Lloyd 9', 30'; Press 56'	Report		Stadium: PPL Park; Attendance: 8,773; Referee: Sheena Dickson (Canada)

October 26 CONCACAF Championship Final	Costa Rica	0–6	United States	Chester, Pennsylvania
18:00 ET		Report	Wambach 4', 35', 41', 71'; Lloyd 17'; Rapinoe (yellow card) 27'; Holiday (yellow card) 60'; Leroux 73'	Stadium: PPL Park; Attendance: 11,625; Referee: Lucila Venegas (Mexico)

December 10 International Tournament of Brasília	United States	1–1	China	Brasília, Brazil
19:20 BRT	Lloyd 23'; Heath (yellow card) 24'	Report	Peng 67'; Qi (yellow card) 89'	Stadium: Estádio Nacional Mané Garrincha; Attendance: 300

December 14 International Tournament of Brasília	Brazil	3–2	United States	Brasília, Brazil
18:45 BRT	Marta 19', 55', 65'; Tayla (yellow card) 89'	Report	Lloyd 6'; Rapinoe 9', (yellow card) 31'; Solo (yellow card) 41'; Wambach 68'	Stadium: Estádio Nacional Mané Garrincha; Attendance: 5,421

December 18 International Tournament of Brasília	United States	7–0	Argentina	Brasília, Brazil
19:20 BRT	Press 7', 23', 41', 78'; Lloyd 30', 44', 47'; Holiday (yellow card) 51'; Leroux (red card) 90+1'	Report	Sampedro (yellow card) 1'	Stadium: Estádio Nacional Mané Garrincha; Attendance: 750

December 21 International Tournament of Brasília Final	Brazil	0–0	United States	Brasília, Brazil
19:00 BRT		Report	Brian (yellow card) 30'; Heath (yellow card) 51'; Wambach (yellow card) 72'	Stadium: Estádio Nacional Mané Garrincha; Attendance: 11,000

=== 2015 ===
February 8 Friendly	France	2–0	United States	Lorient, France
19:00 CET	Le Sommer 50'; Houara 51'	Report	Heath (yellow card) 26'	Stadium: Stade du Moustoir; Attendance: 15,663; Referee: Pernilla Larsson (Sweden)

February 13 Friendly	England	0–1	United States	Milton Keynes, England
21:00 GMT		Report	Morgan 25'	Stadium: Stadium MK; Attendance: 14,369; Referee: Sandra Bastos (Portugal)

March 4 Algarve Cup	Norway	1–2	United States	Vila Real de Santo António, Portugal
21:00 WET	Hegerberg 43'; Rønning (yellow card) 62'	Report	Lloyd 55', 62'	Stadium: Municipal Stadium; Attendance: 500; Referee: Esther Staubil (Switzerland)

March 6 Algarve Cup	United States	3–0	Switzerland	Vila Real de Santo António, Portugal
17:00 WET	Morgan 54'; Lloyd (yellow card) 62'; Rodriguez 72'; Wambach 81'	Report	Wälti (yellow card) 70'	Stadium: Municipal Stadium; Attendance: 500; Referee: Cristina Dorcioman (Romania)

March 9 Algarve Cup	United States	0–0	Iceland	Lagos, Portugal
17:3- WET	Morgan (yellow card) 53'	Report	Magnúsdóttir (yellow card) 14'; Gunnarsdóttir (yellow card) 72'; Viðarsdóttir (yellow card) 89'	Stadium: Municipal Stadium; Attendance: 500; Referee: Abirami Naidu (Singapore)

March 11 Algarve Cup Final	France	0–2	United States	Faro Portugal
16:00 WET		Report	Johnston 7'; Brian (yellow card) 33'; Press 41'	Stadium: Estádio Algarve; Attendance: 1,500; Referee: Cristina Dorcioman (Romania)

April 4 Friendly	United States	4–0	New Zealand	St. Louis, MO
17:00 CT	Klingenberg 14'; Chalupny 76'; Johnston 78'; Brian 81'	Report		Stadium: Busch Stadium; Attendance: 35,817; Referee: Carol Anne Chenard (Canada)

May 10 Friendly	United States	3–0	Republic of Ireland	San Jose, California
11:30 PT	Wambach 42', 45'; Johnston 54'	Report	O'Gorman (yellow card) 19'	Stadium: Avaya Stadium; Attendance: 18,000 (sellout); Referee: Ekaterina Koroleva (United States)

May 17 Friendly	United States	5–1	Mexico	Carson, California
18:00 PT	Leroux 28', 61'; Chalupny 46'; Wambach 58', 72'	Report	Calderón 39'	Stadium: StubHub Center; Attendance: 27,000 (sellout); Referee: Marianela Araya Cruz (Costa Rica)

May 30 Friendly	United States	0–0	South Korea	Harrison, New Jersey
17:05 ET	Lloyd (yellow card) 56'	Report		Stadium: Red Bull Arena; Attendance: 26,467 (sellout); Referee: Mirian Leon (El Salvador)

June 8 World Cup Group Stage	United States	3–1	Australia	Winnipeg, Canada
18:30 MT	Rapinoe 12', 78', (yellow card) 64'; Holiday (yellow card) 56'; Press 61'	Report	De Vanna 27'	Stadium: Winnipeg Stadium; Attendance: 31,148; Referee: Claudia Umpiérrez (Uruguay)

June 12 World Cup Group Stage	United States	0–0	Sweden	Winnipeg, Canada
19:00 MT		Report		Stadium: Winnipeg Stadium; Attendance: 32,716; Referee: Sachiko Yamagishi (Japan)

June 16 World Cup Group Stage	Nigeria	0–1	United States	Vancouver, Canada
17:00 PT	Nnodim (yellow card) 38' (yellow-red card) 69'; Ebi (yellow card) 43'; Chukwunonye (yellow card) 60'; Okobi (yellow card) 68'	Report	Wambach 45'	Stadium: BC Place; Attendance: 52,193; Referee: Kateryna Monzul (Ukraine)

June 22 World Cup Round of 16	United States	2–0	Colombia	Edmonton, Canada
18:00 MT	Holiday (yellow card) 17'; Rapinoe (yellow card) 41'; Morgan 53'; Lloyd 66' (pen.)	Report	Pérez (red card) 22'; Clavijo (yellow card) 65'	Stadium: Commonwealth Stadium; Attendance: 19,412; Referee: Stéphanie Frappart (France)

June 26 World Cup Quarterfinal	China	0–1	United States	Ottawa, Canada
19:30 ET	Wu (yellow card) 50'	Report	Lloyd 51'	Stadium: Lansdowne Stadium; Attendance: 24,141; Referee: Carina Vitulano (Italy)

June 30 World Cup Semifinal	United States	2–0	Germany	Montreal, Canada
19:00 ET	Sauerbrunn (yellow card) 38'; Johnston (yellow card) 59'; Lloyd 69' (pen.); O'Hara 84'	Report	Maier (yellow card) 34'; Krahn (yellow card) 67'	Stadium: Olympic Stadium; Attendance: 51,176; Referee: Teodora Albon (Romania)

July 5 World Cup Final	United States	5–2	Japan	Vancouver, Canada
16:00 PT	Lloyd 3', 5', 16'; Holiday 14'; Heath 54'	Report	Ogimi 27'; Johnston 52' (o.g.); Sawa (yellow card) 82'; Iwabuchi (yellow card) 85'	Stadium: BC Place; Attendance: 53,341; Referee: Kateryna Monzul (Ukraine)

August 16 Friendly	United States	8–0	Costa Rica	Pittsburgh, PA
13:30 ET	O'Reilly 4', 59'; Press 29', 45', 68'; Johnston 36'; Klingenberg 56'; Engen 63'	Report		Stadium: Heinz Field; Attendance: 44,028; Referee: Ekaterina Koroleva (United States)

August 19 Friendly	United States	7–2	Costa Rica	Chattanooga, Tennessee
18:30 ET	Lloyd 7', 20'; O'Reilly 13', 23'; Wambach 18'; Alvarado 31' (o.g.); Morgan 81'	Report	Benavides (yellow card) 36'; Granados 41'; Villalobos (yellow card) 62', (goal) 69'	Stadium: Finley Stadium; Attendance: 20,535; Referee: Margaret Domka (United States)

September 17 Friendly	United States	5–0	Haiti	Detroit, MI
19:00 ET	Lloyd 6', 37' (pen.), 69'; Press 33'; Dunn 90+3'	Report	Boulos (yellow card) 85'	Stadium: Ford Field; Attendance: 34,538; Referee: Katja Koroleva (United States)

September 20 Friendly	United States	8–0	Haiti	Birmingham, Alabama
13:30 CT	Johnston 1'; Lloyd 16', 22', 39'; Dunn 17'; Rodriguez 51'; Morgan 85'; O'Reilly 89'	Report	Mondésir (yellow card) 72'	Stadium: Legion Field; Attendance: 35,735; Referee: Margaret Domka (United States)

October 21 Friendly	United States	1–1	Brazil	Seattle, WA
19:00 PT	Lloyd 85'	Report	Monica 3'	Stadium: CenturyLink Field; Attendance: 23,603; Referee: Katja Koroleva (United States)

October 25 Friendly	United States	3–1	Brazil	Orlando, Florida
15:00 ET	Morgan 9'; Dunn 45+3'; McCaffrey 90+4'	Report	Cristiane 45'	Stadium: Orlando Citrus Bowl; Attendance: 32,869; Referee: Margaret Domka (United States)

December 10 Friendly	United States	6–0	Trinidad and Tobago	San Antonio, Texas
20:00 CT	Lloyd 22'; Morgan 52'; Press 61', 75', 84'; Horan 90+2'	Report	Cordner (yellow card) 19'; St. Louis (yellow card) 28'	Stadium: Alamodome; Attendance: 10,690; Referee: Lucila Venegas (Mexico)

December 13 Friendly	United States	2–0	China	Phoenix, Arizona
17:00 MT	Dunn 39'; Press 81'	Report		Stadium: University of Phoenix Stadium; Attendance: 19,066; Referee: Cardella Samuels (Jamaica)

December 16 Friendly	United States	0–1	China	New Orleans, LA
19:00 CT		Report	Wang 59', (yellow card) 89'; Li (yellow card) 76'	Stadium: Mercedes-Benz Superdome; Attendance: 32,950; Referee: Michelle Py (Canada)

=== 2016 ===
January 23 Friendly	United States	5–0	Republic of Ireland	San Diego, CA
14:00 PT	Lloyd 6', 21', 28'; Morgan 45'; Pugh 83'	Report		Stadium: Qualcomm Stadium; Attendance: 23,309; Referee: Karen Abt (United States)

February 10 Olympic Qualifying	United States	5–0	Costa Rica	Frisco, Texas
21:30 CT	Morgan 1', 62'; Lloyd 9' (pen.); Dunn 15'; Johnston (yellow card) 31'; Press 83'	Report	Díaz (yellow card) 15'; Alvarado (yellow card) 29'	Stadium: Toyota Stadium; Attendance: 8,143; Referee: Cardella Samuels (Jamaica)

February 13 Olympic Qualifying	Mexico	0–1	United States	Frisco, Texas
17:00 PT	Noyola (yellow card) 48'	Report	Heath (yellow card) 33'; Lloyd 80'	Stadium: Toyota Stadium; Attendance: 15,032; Referee: Melissa Borjas (Honduras)

February 15 Olympic Qualifying	United States	10–0	Puerto Rico	Frisco, Texas
21:30 CT	Dunn 6', 21', 61', 85', 87'; Lloyd 19'; O'Hara 45'; Rivera 60' (o.g.); Press 62'; Mewis 90+1'	Report		Stadium: Toyota Stadium; Attendance: 7,658; Referee: Crystal Sobers (Trinidad and Tobago)

February 19 Olympic Qualifying	United States	5–0	Trinidad and Tobago	Houston, TX
19:30	Heath 12'; Morgan 30', 71', 73'; Lloyd 43'	Report	St. Louis (yellow card) 27'	Stadium: BBVA Stadium; Attendance: 5,561; Referee: Tatiana Guzman (Nicaragua)

February 21 Olympic Qualifying Final	Canada	0–2	United States	Houston, TX
16:00 CT	Belanger (yellow card) 20'	Report	Horan 53'; Heath 61'; Pugh (yellow card) 79'	Stadium: BBVA Stadium; Attendance: 10,119; Referee: Quetzalli Alvarado (Mexico)

March 3 SheBelieves Cup	United States	1–0	England	Tampa, Florida
19:30 ET	Dunn 72'	Report	Greenwood (yellow card) 31'	Stadium: Raymond James Stadium; Attendance: 13,027; Referee: Tatiana Alguera (Nicaragua)

March 6 SheBelieves Cup	United States	1–0	France	Nashville, Tennessee
14:00 CT	Morgan 90+1'	Report	Hamraoui (yellow card) 41'; Majri (yellow card) 78'	Stadium: Nissan Stadium; Attendance: 25,363; Referee: Alondra Arellano Sandoval (Mexico)

March 9 SheBelieves Cup	United States	2–1	Germany	Boca Raton, Florida
19:30 ET	Morgan 35'; Mewis 41'	Report	Anja Mittag 29'; Kerschowski (yellow card) 55'; Maier (yellow card) 76'	Stadium: FAU Stadium; Attendance: 13,501; Referee: Carol-Anne Chenard (Canada)

April 6 Friendly	United States	7–0	Colombia	East Hartford, Connecticut
19:00 ET	Dunn 27'; Long 32', 65'; Pugh 33'; Lloyd 39'; Heath 62'; Press 74'	Report	Velásquez (yellow card) 18'; Cuesta (yellow card) 78'	Stadium: Pratt & Whitney Stadium at Rentschler Field; Attendance: 21,792; Referee: Marie-Soleil Beaudoin (Canada)

April 10 Friendly	United States	3–0	Colombia	Chester, Pennsylvania
14:00 ET	Press 26'; Johnston 42', 79'	Report	Salazar (yellow card) 54'; Gaitan (yellow card) 77'	Stadium: Talen Energy Stadium; Attendance: 17,275; Referee: Margaret Domka (United States)

June 2 Friendly	United States	3–3	Japan	Commerce City, Colorado
19:30 MT	Morgan 27', 64'; Horan 89'	Report	Iwabuchi 14'; Ogimi 22', (yellow card) 39' (yellow-red card) 57'; Kumagai (yellow card) 63'; Yokoyama 90+3'	Stadium: Dick's Sporting Goods Park; Attendance: 18,572 (sellout); Referee: Margaret Domka (United States)

June 5 Friendly	United States	2–0	Japan	Cleveland, OH
13:00 ET	Johnston (yellow card) 13' (goal) 27'; Morgan 62'	Report	Sugasawa (yellow card) 37'	Stadium: FirstEnergy Stadium; Attendance: 23,535; Referee: Marianela Cruz (Costa Rica)

July 9 Friendly	United States	1–0	South Africa	Chicago, IL
12:30 CT	Dunn 35'; Klingenberg (yellow card) 84'	Report	Nyandeni (yellow card) 90+2'	Stadium: Soldier Field; Attendance: 19,272; Referee: Maria Serpas (El Salvador)

July 22 Friendly	United States	4–0	Costa Rica	Kansas City, Kansas
20:00 CT	Dunn 15'; Pugh 22'; Long (yellow card) 24'; Lloyd 45+6'; Press 79'	Report	Alvarado (yellow card) 10'; Villalobos (yellow card) 28'	Stadium: Children's Mercy Park; Attendance: 12,635; Referee: Ekaterina Koroleva (United States)

August 3 Olympics	United States	2–0	New Zealand	Belo Horizonte, Brazil
19:00 BRT	Lloyd 9'; Morgan 46'	Report	Hassett (yellow card) 18'; Riley (yellow card) 30'; Percival (yellow card) 64'	Stadium: Mineirão; Attendance: 9,556; Referee: Kateryna Monzul (Ukraine)

August 6 Olympics	United States	1–0	France	Belo Horizonte, Brazil
17:00 BRT	Lloyd 63'; Dunn (yellow card) 68'	Report	Bathy (yellow card) 82'	Stadium: Mineirão; Attendance: 11,782; Referee: Claudia Umpierrez (Uruguay)

August 9 Olympics	Colombia	2–2	United States	Manaus, Brazil
18:00 AMT	Usme 26', 90'; Salazar (yellow card) 72'; Gaitan (yellow card) 88'	Report	Dunn 41'; Pugh 59'; Krieger (yellow card) 86'	Stadium: Arena da Amazônia; Attendance: 30,557; Referee: Teodora Albon (Romania)

August 12 Olympics Quarterfinal	United States	1–1 (a.e.t.) (3–4 p)	Sweden	Brasília, Brazil
13:00 BRT	Morgan 77'; Lloyd (yellow card) 110'	Report	Schelin (yellow card) 57'; Blackstenius 61'	Stadium: Estádio Nacional Mané Garrincha; Attendance: 13,892; Referee: Anna-Marie Keighley (New Zealand)
	Penalties
	Morgan (penalty missed); Horan (penalty scored); Lloyd (penalty scored); Brian (penalty scored); Press (penalty missed)		(penalty scored) Schelin; (penalty scored) Asllani; (penalty missed) Sembrant; (penalty scored) Seger; (penalty scored) Dahlkvist

September 15 Friendly	United States	9–0	Thailand	Columbus, Ohio
20:00 ET	Lloyd 1', 60', 81'; Press 4'; O'Reilly 5'; Heath 36'; Dunn 70'; Morgan 86', 90+2'; Horan (yellow card) 90'	Report		Stadium: MAPFRE Stadium; Attendance: 10,490; Referee: Christina Unkel (United States)

September 18 Friendly	United States	3–1	Netherlands	Atlanta, GA
19:00 ET	Lloyd 35'; van den Berg 50' (o.g.): Long 77'	Report	van de Sanden 2'; Miedema (yellow card) 62'; Janssen (yellow card) 90+2'	Stadium: Georgia Dome; Attendance: 15,652; Referee: Crystal Sobers (Trinidad and Tobago)

October 19 Friendly	United States	4–0	Switzerland	Sandy, Utah
19:00 MT	Williams 46', (yellow card) 81'; Heath 61'; Press 69'; Mewis 76'	Report	Maritz (yellow card) 44'; Calligaris (yellow card) 85'; Zehnder (yellow card) 86'	Stadium: Rio Tinto Stadium; Attendance: 14,336; Referee: Melissa Borjas Pastrana (Honduras)

October 23 Friendly	United States	5–1	Switzerland	Minneapolis, MN
12:45 CT	Carli Lloyd\Lloyd 25', 51'; Press 53'; Dunn 63'; Short (yellow card) 73'; Ohai 82'	Report	Mauron 7', (yellow card) 17'; Calligaris (yellow card) 21'; Moser (yellow card) 90+3'	Stadium: U.S. Bank Stadium; Attendance: 23,400; Referee: Margaret Domka (United States)

November 10 Friendly	United States	8–1	Romania	San Jose, California
19:00 PT	Press 8', 34', 38'; Heath 10'; Brian 25'; Morgan 52', 75'; Ficzay 90+2' (o.g.)	Report	Rus (yellow card) 25', (goal) 31'; Lunca (yellow card) 26'; Meluță (yellow card) 59'	Stadium: Avaya Stadium; Attendance: 16,425; Referee: Ekaterina Koroleva (United States)

November 13 Friendly	United States	5–0	Romania	Carson, California
18:30 PT	Meluță 20' (o.g.); Dunn 45+1'; Press 55'; Brian 88'; Mewis 90+1'	Report	Giurgiu (yellow card) 16'; Brtan (yellow card) 58'; Meluță (yellow card) 59'; Voicu (yellow card) 68'	Stadium: StubHub Center; Attendance: 20,336; Referee: Margaret Domka (United States)

=== 2017 ===
March 1 SheBelieves Cup	United States	1–0	Germany	Philadelphia, PA
19:05 ET	Williams 56'; Horan (yellow card) 90'	Report	Kerschowski (yellow card) 42'; Blässe (yellow card) 63'	Stadium: Talen Energy Stadium; Attendance: 16,318; Referee: Carol Ann Chenard (Canada)

March 4 SheBelieves Cup	United States	0–1	England	Harrison, New Jersey
17:22 ET	Lloyd (yellow card) 68'	Report	White 89'	Stadium: Red Bull Arena; Attendance: 26,500 (Sellout); Referee: Quetzalli Alvarado (Mexico)

March 7 SheBelieves Cup	United States	0–3	France	Washington, D.C.
19:00 ET	Naeher (yellow card) 7'	Report	Abily 8' (pen.), 63'; Le Sommer 9'; Toletti (yellow card) 18'; Georges (yellow card) 74'	Stadium: RFK Stadium; Attendance: 21,638; Referee: Marie-Soleil Beaudoin (Canada)

April 6 Friendly	United States	4–0	Russia	Frisco, Texas
19:30 CT	Dunn 10', 41'; Long 18', 70'; Press (yellow card) 90'	Report	Danilova (yellow card) 55'; Sheykina (yellow card) 66'; Cholovyaga (yellow card) 74'	Stadium: Toyota Stadium; Attendance: 15,191; Referee: Ekaterina Koroleva (United States)

April 9 Friendly	United States	5–1	Russia	Houston, TX
13:00 CT	Lloyd 20'; Lavelle 37'; Dunn 38', 48'; Short (yellow card) 42'; Kovalenko 45+2'	Report	Kovalenko (yellow card) 19'; Karpova 42' (pen.), (yellow card) 44'	Stadium: BBVA Stadium; Attendance: 11,347; Referee: Karen Abt (United States)

June 8 Friendly	Sweden	0–1	United States	Gothenburg, Sweden
19:30 CEST		Report	Lavelle 56'	Stadium: Gamla Ullevi; Attendance: 10,011; Referee: Olga Zadinova (Czech Republic)

June 11 Friendly	Norway	0–1	United States	Sandefjord, Norway
19:15 CEST	Hegerberg (yellow card) 74'	Report	Press 60'	Stadium: Komplett Arena; Attendance: 3,866; Referee: Amy Fearn (England)

July 27 Tournament of Nations	United States	0–1	Australia	Seattle, WA
19:05 PT		Report	Butt 67'; Gorry (yellow card) 89'; Williams (yellow card) 90+1'	Stadium: CenturyLink Field; Attendance: 15,748; Referee: Marie-Soleil Beaudoin (Canada)

July 30 Tournament of Nations	United States	4–3	Brazil	San Diego, CA
17:00 PT	Mewis 18'; Sauerbrunn (yellow card) 54'; Press 80'; Rapinoe 85'; Ertz 89'	Report	Andressa 2', 78'; Jucinara (yellow card) 36'; Bia (yellow card) 59'; Benites 63'; Marta (yellow card) 84'; Barbara (yellow card) 89'	Stadium: Qualcomm Stadium; Attendance: 21,096; Referee: Melissa Borjas (Honduras)

August 3 Tournament of Nations	United States	3–0	Japan	Carson, California
19:00 PT	Rapinoe 12'; Pugh 60'; Morgan 80'	Report		Stadium: StubHub Center; Attendance: 23,161; Referee: Carol-Ann Chenard (Canada)

September 15 Friendly	United States	3–1	New Zealand	Commerce City, Colorado
20:00 MT	Ertz 16', 24'; Morgan 79'	Report	Wilkinson 75'	Stadium: Dick's Sporting Goods Park; Attendance: 17,301; Referee: Katja Koroleva (United States)

September 19 Friendly	United States	5–0	New Zealand	Cincinnati, OH
20:00 ET	Horan 36'; Pugh 44'; Morgan 46', 69'; Williams 55'	Report	Wilkinson (yellow card) 35'	Stadium: Nippert Stadium; Attendance: 30,596; Referee: Christina Unkel (United States)

October 19 Friendly	United States	3–1	South Korea	New Orleans, LA
19:00 CT	Ertz 24'; Morgan 40'; Rapinoe 52' (pen.)	Report	Han 45+3', (yellow card) 61'; Park (yellow card) 74'	Stadium: Mercedes-Benz Superdome; Attendance: 9,371; Referee: Christina Unkel (United States)

October 22 Friendly	United States	6–0	South Korea	Cary, North Carolina
14:00 ET	Mewis 3', 20'; Press 35'; Ertz 45+1'; Williams 61', (yellow card) 68'; Long 83'	Report		Stadium: WakeMed Soccer Park; Attendance: 9,727; Referee: Sheena Dickson (Canada)

November 9 Friendly	Canada	1–1	United States	Vancouver, Canada
19:00 PT	Leon 56'; Beckie (yellow card) 59'; Kelly (yellow card) 79'	Report	Morgan 31'	Stadium: BC Place; Attendance: 28,017; Referee: Marianela Araya Cruz (Costa Rica)

November 12 Friendly	United States	3–1	Canada	San Jose, California
18:00 PT	Ertz 11'; Morgan 56'; Lloyd 80'	Report	Beckie 50'; Riviere (yellow card) 79'	Stadium: Avaya Stadium; Attendance: 17,960; Referee: Karen Abt (United States)

=== 2018 ===
January 21 Friendly	United States	5–1	Denmark	San Diego, CA
16:30 PT	Morgan 17'; Ertz 19' (yellow card) 74'; Pugh 47', 65'; Dunn 81'	Report	Nadim 14'; Harder (yellow card) 21'	Stadium: SDCCU Stadium; Attendance: 17,526; Referee: Karen Abt (United States)

March 1 SheBelieves Cup	United States	1–0	Germany	Columbus, Ohio
19:00 ET	Rapinoe 17'	Report	Popp (yellow card) 75'; Kemme (yellow card) 83'	Stadium: MAPFRE Stadium; Attendance: 14,591; Referee: Melissa Borjas (Honduras)

March 4 SheBelieves Cup	United States	1–1	France	Harrison, New Jersey
12:00 ET	Pugh 35'	Report	Asseyi (yellow card) 30'; Torrent (yellow card) 33'; Le Sommer 38' (yellow card) 90'	Stadium: Red Bull Arena; Attendance: 25,706; Referee: Lucila Venegas (Mexico)

March 7 SheBelieves Cup	United States	1–0	England	Orlando, Florida
19:00 ET	Bardsley 58' (o.g.)	Report		Stadium: Orlando City Stadium; Attendance: 12,351; Referee: Carol Anne Chenard (Canada)

April 5 Friendly	United States	4–1	Mexico	Jacksonville, Florida
19:15 ET	Pugh 6'; Morgan 51', 53'; Lloyd 54'	Report	Johnson 64'	Stadium: Everbank Field; Attendance: 14,360; Referee: Cardella Samuels (Jamaica)

April 8 Friendly	United States	6–2	Mexico	Houston, TX
12:30 CT	Pugh 3'; Horan 25'; Lloyd 34'; Morgan 44', 68'; Rapinoe 64'	Report	Ocampo 17'; Palacios 24'	Stadium: BBVA Stadium; Attendance: 15,349; Referee: Karen Abt (United States)

June 7 Friendly	United States	1–0	China	Sandy, Utah
19:00 MT	Morgan 57'	Report	Wu (yellow card) 71'	Stadium: Rio Tinto Stadium; Attendance: 13,230; Referee: Lucila Venegas (Mexico)

June 12 Friendly	United States	2–1	China	Cleveland, OH
19:00 ET	Rapinoe 35'; Davidson (yellow card) 69'; Heath 75'	Report	Li 72'; Han (yellow card) 78'	Stadium: FirstEnergy Stadium; Attendance: 12,335; Referee: Christina Unkel (United States)

July 26 Tournament of Nations	United States	4–2	Japan	Kansas City, Kansas
18:15 CT	Morgan 18', 26', 56'; Megan Rapinoe 66'	Report	Tanaka 20'; Sakaguchi 76'	Stadium: Children's Mercy Park; Attendance: 18,467 (sellout); Referee: Carol-Ann Chenard (Canada)

July 29 Tournament of Nations	United States	1–1	Australia	East Hartford, Connecticut
19:00 ET	Horan 90'	Report	Logarzo 22', (yellow card) 37'; Williams (yellow card) 57'; Egmond (yellow card) 83'	Stadium: Pratt & Whitney Stadium at Rentschler Field; Attendance: 21,570; Referee: Miriam Leon (El Salvador)

August 2 Tournament of Nations	United States	4–1	Brazil	Bridgeview, Illinois
19:30 CT	Dunn (yellow card) 12'; Lavelle 33'; Ertz 53'; Heath 61'; Morgan 77'	Report	Davidson 16' (o.g.); Camila (yellow card) 44'; Tayla (yellow card) 74'	Stadium: Toyota Park; Attendance: 18,309; Referee: Quetzalli Alvarado (Mexico)

August 31 Friendly	United States	3–0	Chile	Carson, California
20:00 PT	Davidson 8'; Guerrero 32' (o.g.); Heath (yellow card) 38'; Press 59'	Report	Urrutia (yellow card) 74'; Soto (yellow card) 80'	Stadium: StubHub Center; Attendance: 23,544; Referee: Katja Koroleva (United States)

September 4 Friendly	United States	4–0	Chile	San Jose, California
19:00 ET	Pugh 34'; Heath 38'; Lloyd 47', 90+3'	Report		Stadium: Avaya Stadium; Attendance: 14,340; Referee: Christina Unkel (United States) (First Half)/Karen Abt (United States) (Second Half)

October 4 CONCACAF Championship	United States	6–0	Mexico	Cary, North Carolina
19:30 ET	Rapinoe 3', 70'; Ertz 47'; Morgan 57', 80'; Heath 61'	Report		Stadium: Sahlen's Stadium; Attendance: 5,404; Referee: Carol Anne Chenard (Canada)

October 7 CONCACAF Championship	Panama	0–5	United States	Cary, North Carolina
17:00 ET	Castillo (yellow card) 71'	Report	Mewis 5'; Lloyd 23', 29', 48'; Press 32'	Stadium: Sahlen's Stadium; Attendance: 7,532; Referee: Tatian Guzman (Nicaragua)

October 10 CONCACAF Championship	Trinidad and Tobago	0–7	United States	Cary, North Carolina
19:30 ET		Report	Morgan 9', 50'; Lavelle 41', 43'; Dunn 45'; Horan 49'; Heath 58'	Stadium: Sahlen's Stadium; Attendance: 3,996; Referee: Odette Hamilton (Jamaica)

October 14 CONCACAF Championship	United States	6–0	Jamaica	Frisco, Texas
19:00 CT	Heath 2', 29'; Rapinoe 15'; Ertz 21'; Morgan 33', 84'	Report		Stadium: Toyota Stadium; Attendance: 7,555; Referee: Francia Gonzalez (Mexico)

October 17 CONCACAF Championship Final	Canada	0–2	United States	Frisco, Texas
19:00 CT	Quinn (yellow card) 27'; Chapman (yellow card) 31'; Buchanan (yellow card) 52'; Fleming (yellow card) 69'	Report	Lavelle 2'; Heath (yellow card) 83'; Morgan 89'	Stadium: Toyota Stadium; Attendance: 6,986; Referee: Lucila Vengas (Mexico)

November 8 Friendly	Portugal	0–1	United States	Estoril, Portugal
17:00 WET	Silva (yellow card) 48'	Report	Sullivan (yellow card) 31'; McDonald 42'	Stadium: Estádio António Coimbra da Mota; Attendance: 980; Referee: Rebecca Welch (England)

November 13 Friendly	Scotland	0–1	United States	Paisley, Scotland
20:00 WET		Report	Sonnett (yellow card) 36'; Morgan 39'	Stadium: St Mirren Park; Attendance: 3,790; Referee: Amy Fearn (England)

=== 2019 ===
January 19 Friendly	France	3–1	United States	Le Havre, France
20:30 CET	Diani 9', 57'; Katoto 78'	Report	Pugh 90+1'	Stadium: Stade Océane; Attendance: 22,780; Referee: Pernilla Larsson (Sweden)

January 22 Friendly	Spain	0–1	United States	Alicante, Spain
20:30 CET	Meseguer (yellow card) 74'	Report	Press 54'	Stadium: Estadio José Rico Pérez; Attendance: 9,182; Referee: Stéphanie Frappart (France)

February 27 SheBelieves Cup	United States	2–2	Japan	Chester, Pennsylvania
19:00 ET	Rapinoe 23'; Morgan 76'	Report	Kumagai (yellow card) 38'; Nakajima 67'; Momiki 90+1'	Stadium: Talen Energy Stadium; Attendance: 14,555; Referee: Melissa Borjas (Honduras)

March 2 SheBelieves Cup	United States	2–2	England	Nashville, Tennessee
15:30 CT	Rapinoe 32'; Heath 66'	Report	Houghton 35'; Parris 52'	Stadium: Nissan Stadium; Attendance: 22,125; Referee: Marianela Araya (Costa Rica)

March 5 SheBelieves Cup	United States	1–0	Brazil	Tampa, Florida
20:00 ET	Heath 20'	Report	Andressa (yellow card) 56'	Stadium: Raymond James Stadium; Attendance: 14,009; Referee: Carol Anne Chénard (Canada)

April 4 Friendly	United States	5–3	Australia	Commerce City, Colorado
19:00 MT	Morgan 14'; Rapinoe (yellow card) 49', (goal) 61'; Heath 53'; Pugh 67', 90+5'; Mewis (yellow card) 90+1'	Report	De Vanna 29'; Foord 47'; Kerr 81'; Polkinghorne (yellow card) 84'	Stadium: Dick's Sporting Goods Park; Attendance: 17,264; Referee: Karen Abt (United States)

April 7 Friendly	United States	6–0	Belgium	Los Angeles, CA
21:00 ET	Lloyd 14', 19', (yellow card) 64'; Horan 26'; Mewis 33'; Morgan 52'; McDonald 90+1'	Report	Cuotereels (yellow card) 90'	Stadium: Banc of California Stadium; Attendance: 20,941; Referee: Ekaterina Koroleva (United States)

May 12 Friendly	United States	3–0	South Africa	Santa Clara, California
13:30 PT	Mewis 37', 78'; Lloyd 90+2'	Report		Stadium: Levi's Stadium; Attendance: 22,788; Referee: Odette Hamilton (Jamaica)

May 16 Friendly	United States	5–0	New Zealand	St. Louis, MO
19:00 CT	Heath 35'; Lavelle 40'; Lloyd 61', 83'; Mewis 84'	Report	Green (yellow card) 33'	Stadium: Busch Stadium; Attendance: 35,761; Referee: Karen Abt (United States)

May 26 Friendly	United States	3–0	Mexico	Harrison, New Jersey
12:00 ET	Heath 11'; Pugh 76'; Press 88'	Report	Robles (yellow card) 38'	Stadium: Red Bull Arena; Attendance: 26,332; Referee: Crystal Sobers (Trinidad and Tobago)

June 11 World Cup Group Stage	United States	13–0	Thailand	Reims, France
21:00 CEST	Morgan 12', 53', 74', 81', 87'; Lavelle 20', 56'; Horan 32'; Mewis 50', 54'; Rapinoe 79'; Pugh 84'; Lloyd 90+2'	Report	Dangda (yellow card) 72'	Stadium: Stade Auguste-Delaune; Attendance: 18,591; Referee: Laura Fortunato (Argentina)

June 16 World Cup Group Stage	United States	3–0	Chile	Paris, France
18:00 CEST	Lloyd 11', 35'; Horan (yellow card) 23'; Ertz 26'; Long (yellow card) 88'	Report	Lara (yellow card) 76'; Huenteo (yellow card) 80'; Galaz (yellow card) 90+4'	Stadium: Parc des Princes; Attendance: 45,594; Referee: Riem Hussein (Germany)

June 20 World Cup Group Stage	Sweden	0–2	United States	Le Havre, France
21:00 CEST	Jakobsson (yellow card) 87'	Report	Horan 3'; Andersson 50' (o.g.); O'Hara (yellow card) 59'	Stadium: Stade Océane; Attendance: 22,418; Referee: Anastasia Pustovoitova (Russia)

June 24 World Cup Round of 16	Spain	1–2	United States	Reims, France
18:00 CEST	Hermoso 9'; Paredes (yellow card) 85'	Report	Rapinoe 7' (pen.), 75' (pen.), (yellow card) 37'	Stadium: Stade Auguste-Delaune; Attendance: 19,633; Referee: Katalin Kulcsár (Hungary)

June 28 World Cup Quarterfinal	France	1–2	United States	Paris, France
21:00 ET	Bathy (yellow card) 4'; Renard 81'; Bussaglia (yellow card) 90+4'	Report	Rapinoe 5', 65'	Stadium: Parc des Princes; Attendance: 45,595; Referee: Kateryna Monzul (Ukraine)

July 2 World Cup Semifinal	England	1–2	United States	Décines-Charpieu, France
21:00 CEST	White 19'; Bright (yellow card) 40' (yellow-red card) 86'; Parris (yellow card) 90+5'	Report	Press 10'; Morgan 31'; Horan (yellow card) 47'; Sauerbrunn (yellow card) 83'	Stadium: Parc Olympique Lyonnais; Attendance: 53,512; Referee: Edina Alves Batista (Brazil)

July 7 World Cup Final	United States	2–0	Netherlands	Décines-Charpieu, France
17:00 CEST	Dahlkemper (yellow card) 41'; Rapinoe 61' (pen.); Lavelle 69'	Report	Spitse (yellow card) 10'; van der Gragt (yellow card) 60'	Stadium: Parc Olympique Lyonnais; Attendance: 57,900; Referee: Stéphanie Frappart (France)

August 3 Friendly	United States	3–0	Republic of Ireland	Pasadena, California
19:00 PT	Heath 16'; Horan 31'; Lloyd 41'	Report	Scott (yellow card) 54'	Stadium: Rose Bowl; Attendance: 37,040; Referee: Ekaterina Koroleva (United States)

August 29 Friendly	United States	4–0	Portugal	Philadelphia, PA
19:00 ET	Heath 4'; Brian 18'; Lloyd 52'; Long 82'	Report	Pinto (yellow card) 83'	Stadium: Lincoln Financial Field; Attendance: 49,504; Referee: Ekaterina Koroleva (United States)

September 3 Friendly	United States	3–0	Portugal	St. Paul, MN
19:00 CT	Lloyd 22', 32' (pen.); Lloyd (yellow card) 78'; Horan 83'	Report	Silva (yellow card) 81'	Stadium: Allianz Field; Attendance: 19,600; Referee: Ekaterina Koroleva (United States)

October 3 Friendly	United States	2–0	South Korea	Charlotte, North Carolina
19:00 ET	Long 45+3'; Pugh 76'	Report		Stadium: Bank of America Stadium; Attendance: 30,071; Referee: Gillian Martindale (Barbados)

October 6 Friendly	United States	1–1	South Korea	Chicago, IL
13:00 CT	Lloyd 37'	Report	Ji 34'; Lee (yellow card) 35'; Son (yellow card) 39' (yellow-red card) 84'	Stadium: Soldier Field; Attendance: 33,027; Referee: Katia Garcia (Mexico)

November 7 Friendly	United States	3–2	Sweden	Columbus, Ohio
19:30 ET	Lloyd 6', 31'; Press 28'; Horan (yellow card) 37'	Report	Olme (yellow card) 44'; Anvegård 75', 79'; Eriksson (yellow card) 90'	Stadium: MAPFRE Stadium; Attendance: 20,903; Referee: Katja Koroleva (United States)

November 10 Friendly	United States	6–0	Costa Rica	Jacksonville, Florida
20:00 ET	Lloyd 4'; Brian 10'; Williams 50', 68'; Press 56'; Blanco 86' (o.g.)	Report		Stadium: TIAA Bank Field; Attendance: 12,914; Referee: Karen Abt (United States)
