= Elísa Viðarsdóttir =

Icelandic footballer

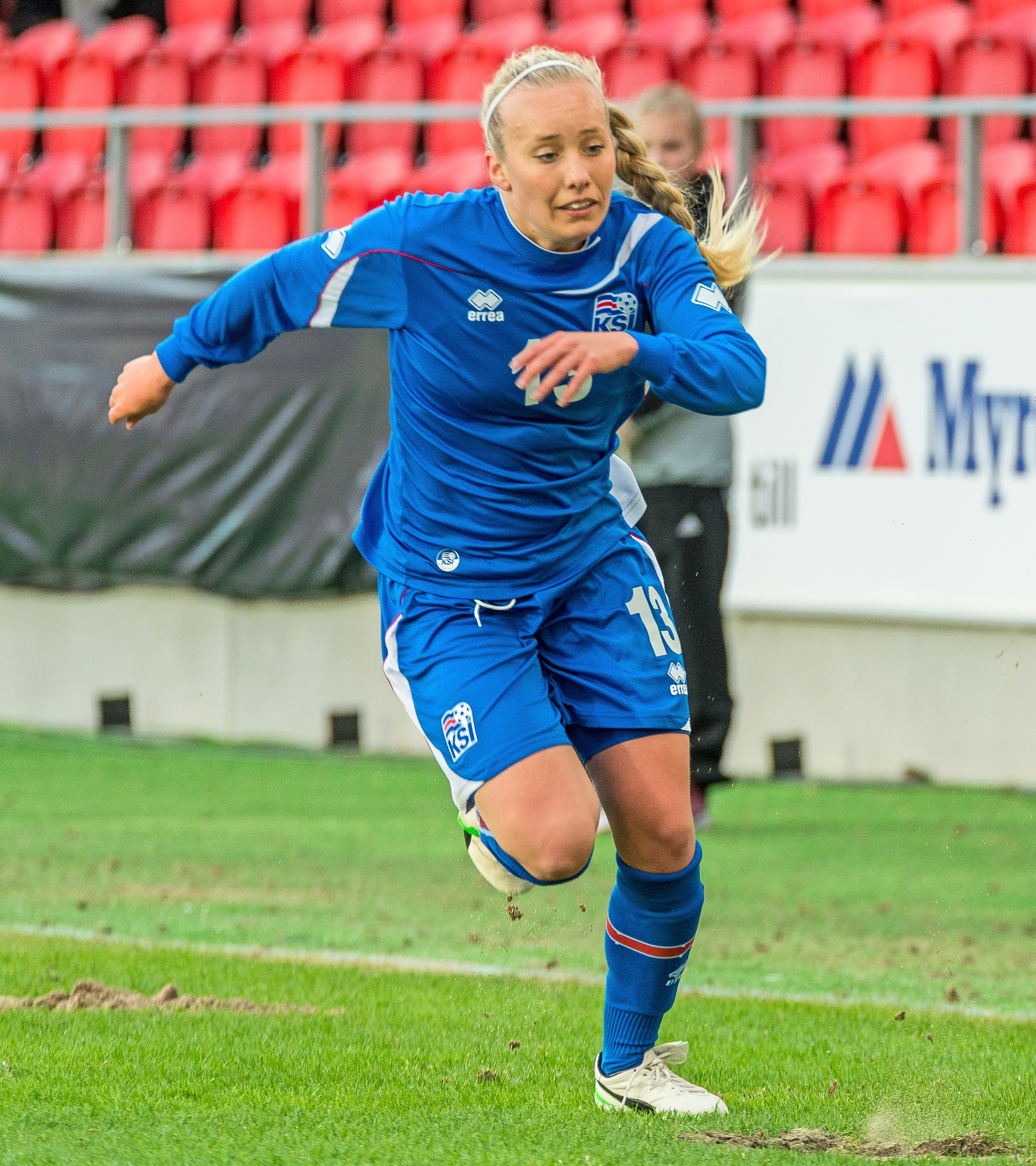
- Elísa in 2013

Personal information
- Full name: Elísa Viðarsdóttir
- Date of birth: 26 May 1991 (age 35)
- Place of birth: Vestmannaeyjar, Iceland
- Position: Defender

Team information
- Current team: Valur
- Number: 7

Youth career
- ÍBV

Senior career*
Years	Team	Apps	(Gls)
2008–2013	ÍBV	92	(10)
2014–2015	Kristianstads DFF	41	(0)
2016–	Valur	111	(6)

International career^{‡}
2009–2010	Iceland U-19	7	(0)
2012	Iceland U-23	1	(0)
2012–	Iceland	54	(0)
- * Club domestic league appearances and goals as of 21 August 2024 ‡ National team caps and goals as of 21 August 2024

Elísa Viðarsdóttir (born 26 May 1991) is an Icelandic footballer who plays as a defender in the Úrvalsdeild for Valur and the Iceland women's national football team. She is the younger sister of Margrét Lára Viðarsdóttir, Iceland's record goalscorer. Like Margrét Lára, she began her career with Úrvalsdeild club ÍBV.

== Club career ==
She has played for ÍBV since 2007 with her first league match coming in 2008.

Kristianstads DFF, the Swedish club where Margrét Lára was playing, gave a trial to Elísa before the start of their 2013 Damallsvenskan season. During Elísa's visit she played in a pre-season friendly but Kristianstads had no immediate plans to sign her to a contract. She eventually transferred to Kristianstads in January 2014, by which time Margrét Lára had gone on maternity leave.

In November 2015, she returned to play in the Úrvalsdeild when she signed a contract with Valur.

== International career ==
Elísa's senior international debut came at the 2012 Algarve Cup, in a 1–0 defeat to Germany.

She was called up to be part of the national team for the UEFA Women's Euro 2013.

== Honours ==
=== Club ===
ÍBV

Runner-up

- Úrvalsdeild: 2012
