= 2012 Algarve Cup =

International women's football tournament

Tournament details
- Host country: Portugal
- Dates: 29 February – 7 March
- Teams: 12 (from 3 confederations)
- Venues: 9 (in 9 host cities)

Final positions
- Champions: Germany (2nd title)
- Runners-up: Japan
- Third place: United States
- Fourth place: Sweden

Tournament statistics
- Matches played: 24
- Goals scored: 62 (2.58 per match)
- Top scorer(s): (Germany) Célia Okoyino da Mbabi (6 goals)
- Best player: (Japan) Aya Miyama

The 2012 Algarve Cup was the nineteenth edition of the Algarve Cup, an invitational women's football tournament held annually in Portugal. It began on 29 February and ended on 7 March 2012.

== Format ==
The twelve invited teams were split into three groups that played a round-robin tournament.

Groups A and B, containing the strongest ranked teams, were the only ones in contention to win the title. The group winners from A and B contested the final, with the runners-up playing for third place and those that finished third in these two groups playing for fifth place.

The teams in Group C were playing for places 7–12, with the winner of Group C playing the team that finished fourth in Group A or B with the better record for seventh place and the Group C runner-up playing the team which came last in Group A or B with the worse record for ninth place. The third and fourth-placed teams in Group C played for the eleventh place.

Points awarded in the group stage followed the standard formula of three points for a win, one point for a draw and zero points for a loss. In the case of two teams being tied on the same number of points in a group, their head-to-head result determined the higher place.

== Teams ==
Listed are the confirmed teams.

Team	FIFA Rankings (December 2011)
United States	1
Germany	2
Japan	3
Sweden	5
Denmark	12
Norway	12
Iceland	15
China	18
Republic of Ireland	29
Hungary	34
Portugal (hosts)	43
Wales	46

== Match officials ==
Country	Referee	Assistant referees
Argentina	Salomé di Iorio	
China PR	Liang Qin	Yongmei Cui; Yan Fang
Cuba	Irazema Aguilera	
Czech Republic	Jana Adámková	Adriana Šecová
Hungary	Katalin Kulcsár	
Italy	Carina Vitulano	Manuela Nicolosi
Japan	Nami Sato	Emi Chiba; Chie Ohata
Mexico	Lucila Venegas	Enedina Caudillo
Scotland	Morag Pirie	
Singapore	Abirami Apbai	
Sweden	Pernilla Larsson	
Togo	Aissata Amegee	
United States	Margaret Domka	

Country	Assistant referees
Canada	Marie-Josée Charbonneau
Colombia	Luzmila Gonzalez
Costa Rica	Kimberly Moreira
Croatia	Sanja Rodak
Cyprus	Angela Kyriakou
Dominican Republic	Milagros Leonardo
England	Sian Massey
Guatemala	Marisol Salazar
Jamaica	Stacey Greyson
Paraguay	Nadia Weiler
Romania	Petruta Iugulsecu
Switzerland	Eveline Bolli
Thailand	Supawan Hinthong
Uganda	Diana Mukasa
Vietnam	Thi Kieu

Country	Fourth official
Argentina	Salomé di Iorio
China PR	Liang Qin
Cuba	Irazema Aguilera
Czech Republic	Jana Adámková
Hungary	Katalin Kulcsár
Italy	Carina Vitulano
Japan	Nami Sato
Mexico	Lucila Venegas
Scotland	Morag Pirie
Singapore	Abirami Apbai
Sweden	Pernilla Larsson
Togo	Aissata Amegee
United States	Margaret Domka

== Group stage ==
All times are local (WET/UTC+0).

=== Group A ===
Team	Pld	W	D	L	GF	GA	GD	Pts
Germany	3	3	0	0	6	0	+6	9
Sweden	3	2	0	1	5	5	0	6
Iceland	3	1	0	2	2	5	−3	3
China	3	0	0	3	0	3	−3	0

29 February 2012
14:00

Germany	1–0	Iceland
Mittag 25'	Report

Estádio Municipal, Lagos
Attendance: 200
Referee: Jana Adámková (Czech Republic)

29 February 2012
15:00

Sweden	1–0	China
Göransson 83'	Report

Estádio Municipal, Santo António
Attendance: 207
Referee: Margaret Domka (United States)

2 March 2012
13:30

Iceland	1–4	Sweden
Lárusdóttir 21'	Report	Schelin 2'; Göransson 13', 38'; Landström 33'

Desportivo da Nora Park, Ferreiras
Attendance: 150
Referee: Morag Pirie (Scotland)

2 March 2012
15:00

Germany	1–0	China
Behringer 33' (pen.)	Report

Estádio Municipal, Santo António
Attendance: 300
Referee: Katalin Kulcsár (Hungary)

5 March 2012
15:30

Sweden	0–4	Germany
	Report	Okoyino da Mbabi 24', 31', 65'; Popp 90+2'

Estádio Municipal, Parchal
Attendance: 500
Referee: Carina Vitulano (Italy)

5 March 2012
15:30

China	0–1	Iceland
	Report	Friðriksdóttir 80'

Estádio Municipal, Lagos
Referee: Lucila Venegas (Mexico)

=== Group B ===
Team	Pld	W	D	L	GF	GA	GD	Pts
Japan	3	3	0	0	5	1	+4	9
United States	3	2	0	1	7	2	+5	6
Denmark	3	1	0	2	1	7	−6	3
Norway	3	0	0	3	2	5	−3	0

29 February 2012
12:40

Japan	2–1	Norway
Nagasato 45+1'; Kawasumi 66'	Report	Herlovsen 17'

Estádio Municipal, Parchal
Referee: Lucila Venegas (Mexico)

29 February 2012
17:00

United States	5–0	Denmark
Morgan 21', 82'; Wambach 45+1'; Lloyd 77'; Leroux 90+1'	Report

Estádio Municipal, Lagos
Attendance: 300
Referee: Liang Qin (China PR)

2 March 2012
12:10

Denmark	0–2	Japan
	Report	Sugasawa 52'; Ohno 90+1'

Estádio Municipal, Parchal
Attendance: 250
Referee: Irazema Aguilera (Cuba)

2 March 2012
15:00

United States	2–1	Norway
Wambach 52'; Leroux 83'	Report	Thorsnes 90+3'

Estádio Municipal, Lagos
Attendance: 300
Referee: Salomé di Iorio (Argentina)

5 March 2012
14:10

Norway	0–1	Denmark
	Report	Rasmussen 7'

Desportivo da Nora Park, Ferreiras
Attendance: 223
Referee: Nami Sato (Japan)

5 March 2012
14:10

Japan	1–0	United States
Takase 84'	Report

Estádio Algarve, Faro
Attendance: 1,000
Referee: Pernill Larsson (Sweden)

=== Group C ===
Team	Pld	W	D	L	GF	GA	GD	Pts
Wales	3	2	1	0	3	1	+2	7
Portugal	3	2	0	1	6	2	+4	6
Hungary	3	1	0	2	2	6	–4	3
Republic of Ireland	3	0	1	2	1	3	−2	1

29 February 2012
15:00

Republic of Ireland	0–1	Hungary
	Report	Sipos 2'

Estádio Municipal, Silves
Referee: Carina Vitulano (Italy)

29 February 2012
15:45

Portugal	0–1	Wales
	Report	James 90+2'

Estádio Municipal, Parchal
Referee: Pernilla Larsson (Sweden)

2 March 2012
15:30

Portugal	4–0	Hungary
Rodrigues 13'; Mendes 56'; Borges 64'; Couto 85'	Report

Estádio Municipal, Parchal
Referee: Abirami Apbai (Singapore)

2 March 2012
18:00

Wales	0–0	Republic of Ireland
	Report

Desportivo da Nora Park, Ferreiras
Referee: Aissata Amegee (Togo)

5 March 2012
17:15

Hungary	1–2	Wales
Vágó 72'	Report	Lander 10', 50'

Estádio Municipal, Santo António
Referee: Liang Qin (China PR)

5 March 2012
17:15

Portugal	2–1	Republic of Ireland
Borges 7', 74'	Report	Quinn 29'

Estádio Algarve, Faro
Referee: Margaret Domka (United States)

== Placement play-offs ==
=== Eleventh place match ===
7 March 2012
11:00

Hungary	1–2	Republic of Ireland
Tálosi 60'	Report	O'Gorman 18'; Russell 52'

Estádio Municipal de Quarteira, Quarteira
Referee: Aissata Amegee (Togo)

=== Ninth place match ===
7 March 2012
10:15

Portugal	0–1	China
	Report	Ma Xiaoxu 58'

Estádio Algarve, Faro
Referee: Katalin Kulcsár (Hungary)

=== Seventh place match ===
7 March 2012
11:00

Wales	0–3	Norway
	Report	Pedersen 49', 69', 81'

Estádio Municipal de Loulé, Loulé
Referee: Jana Adámková (Czech Republic)

=== Fifth place match ===
7 March 2012
11:00

Iceland	1–3	Denmark
Magnúsdóttir 44'	Report	Troelsgaard Nielsen 3', 18'; Rasmussen 88'

Desportivo da Nora Park, Ferreiras
Attendance: 54
Referee: Salomé di Iorio (Argentina)

=== Third place match ===
7 March 2012
11:00

Sweden	0–4	United States
	Report	Morgan 4', 33', 73'; Wambach 36'

Estádio Municipal, Parchal
Attendance: 400
Referee: Morag Pirie (Scotland)

=== Final ===
7 March 2012
13:10

Germany	4–3	Japan
Marozsán 20'; Okoyino da Mbabi 22', 88', 90+2'	Report	Kawasumi 35'; Tanaka 55'; Nagasato 90'

Estádio Algarve, Faro
Attendance: 500
Referee: Margaret Domka (United States)

== Goalscorers ==
6 goals

- (Germany) Célia Okoyino da Mbabi

5 goals

- (United States) Alex Morgan

3 goals

- (Norway) Cecilie Pedersen
- (Portugal) Ana Borges
- (Sweden) Antonia Göransson
- (United States) Abby Wambach

2 goals

- (Denmark) Johanna Rasmussen
- (Denmark) Sanne Troelsgaard Nielsen
- (Japan) Nahomi Kawasumi
- (Japan) Yūki Nagasato
- (United States) Sydney Leroux
- (Wales) Helen Lander

1 goal

- (China) Ma Xiaoxu
- (Germany) Melanie Behringer
- (Germany) Dzsenifer Marozsán
- (Germany) Anja Mittag
- (Germany) Alexandra Popp
- (Hungary) Lilla Sipos
- (Hungary) Szabina Tálosi
- (Hungary) Fanny Vágó
- (Republic of Ireland) Áine O'Gorman
- (Republic of Ireland) Louise Quinn
- (Republic of Ireland) Julie-Ann Russell
- (Iceland) Fanndís Friðriksdóttir
- (Iceland) Dóra María Lárusdóttir
- (Iceland) Hólmfríður Magnúsdóttir
- (Norway) Isabell Herlovsen
- (Norway) Elise Thorsnes
- (Japan) Shinobu Ohno
- (Japan) Yuika Sugasawa
- (Japan) Megumi Takase
- (Japan) Asuna Tanaka
- (Portugal) Carla Couto
- (Portugal) Carolina Mendes
- (Portugal) Andrea Rodrigues
- (Sweden) Jessica Landström
- (Sweden) Lotta Schelin
- (United States) Carli Lloyd
- (Wales) Angharad James

== Final standings ==
Rank	Team
1st place, gold medalist(s)	Germany
2nd place, silver medalist(s)	Japan
3rd place, bronze medalist(s)	United States
4	Sweden
5	Denmark
6	Iceland
7	Norway
8	Wales
9	China
10	Portugal
11	Republic of Ireland
12	Hungary

2012 Algarve Cup

Germany
Second title
