= Christina Unkel =

American sports executive, attorney, broadcaster and former football referee

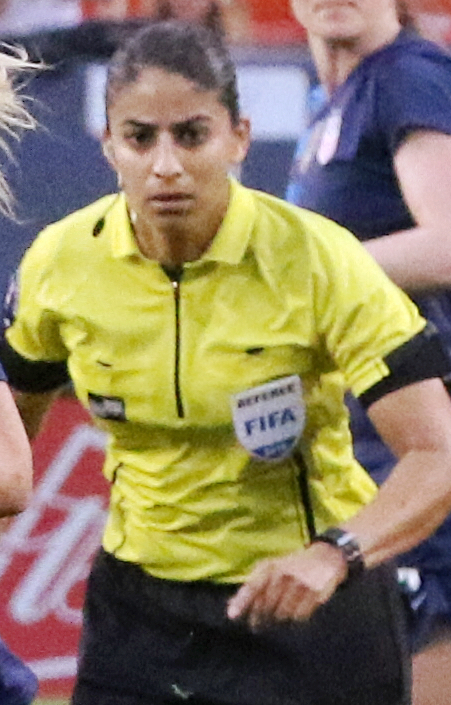
Unkel refereeing in 2018

Christina Unkel (née Ibanez; born 1986 or 1987) is an American sports executive, attorney, broadcaster and former football referee. She currently serves as President and General Manager of Tampa Bay Sun FC, the inaugural champions of the USL Super League.

== Early life ==
Unkel started refereeing at the age of ten. She graduated from Palm Beach Atlantic University in 2008, after which she attended Stetson University, earning a Juris Doctor and an MBA.

== Career ==
In 2024, Unkel was appointed President and General Manager of Tampa Bay Sun FC.

In 2024, Unkel partnered with former U.S. Women’s National Team player Lori Lindsey to launch The Soccer Podcast USA, a show focused on the future of women’s football. The show is available on major platforms including Apple Podcasts and Spotify.

Unkel is a former FIFA referee, serving internationally and in professional domestic leagues in the United States. She later served as State Referee Administrator for the Florida State Referee Committee.

Unkel is also a football analyst, providing expert commentary for broadcasters including FOX Sports, CBS Sports, ESPN, ITV and Talksport for tournaments such as the FIFA Women’s World Cup, UEFA Champions League, UEFA Euro 2024 and the 2026 FIFA World Cup. In June 2024, she was employed by British television broadcaster ITV as a refereeing and rules expert for the coverage of the UEFA Euro 2024 in Germany.

Unkel began her career in football as a referee, becoming one of the youngest FIFA-certified officials in the world, and officiated at the highest levels of the sport, including international tournaments and professional leagues, before shifting into leadership and media roles.

Before transitioning into sports executive leadership, Unkel worked as a litigation attorney and sports law expert, advising on legal, regulatory, and compliance matters in the athletic and media sectors.

In addition to her executive role in professional football, Unkel is the founder of SPARQ Consulting, where she advises athletes, organizations, and media entities on sports governance, ethics, and leadership.

She has served on multiple advisory boards and leadership councils, including Women in Sports and Events (WISE) Tampa Bay.

Unkel is a public speaker, delivering keynotes and panels on topics ranging from sports leadership and legal ethics to gender equity and entrepreneurship at conferences including TEDxUSFSM, the Women’s Conference of Florida, WISE Tampa Bay, and events hosted by the Latin Chamber of Commerce.

== Personal life ==
Unkel married American football referee Ted Unkel on 2 May 2009, after meeting at a football tournament in Cocoa Beach, Florida.

She is also an avid Leeds United fan.
