= Angela Kyriakou =

Cypriot football referee

Angela Kyriakou (Greek: Αγγέλα Κυριάκου; born 11 August 1977) is a Cypriot football referee.
