= Teodora Nicoară =

Romanian footballer (born 1999)

Teodora Meluță
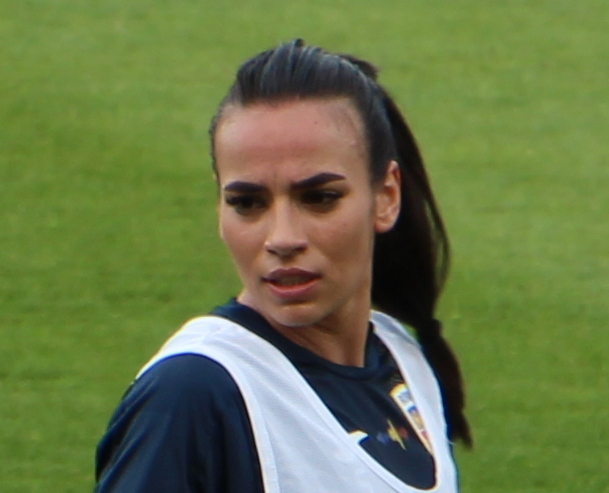

Personal information
- Date of birth: 3 August 1999 (age 27)
- Place of birth: Bucharest, Romania
- Height: 1.75 m (5 ft 9 in)
- Position: Defender

Team information
- Current team: Beşiktaş

Senior career*
Years	Team	Apps	(Gls)
2015–2021	Olimpia Cluj	112	(16)
2021	Lugano	7	(0)
2021–2024	Politehnica Timișoara	12	(3)
2024–2025	Fatih Vatan	24	(1)
2025–	Beşiktaş	0	(0)

International career^{‡}
2016–	Romania	23	(2)
- * Club domestic league appearances and goals as of 4 August 2025 ‡ National team caps and goals as of 17:41, 13 February 2021 (UTC)

Teodora "Teo" Nicoară (Romanian: [te.oˈdo.ra nikoˈa.rə]; née Meluță ([meˈlu.t͡sə]); born 3 August 1999) is a Romanian women's football defender who plays in the Turkish Super League for Beşiktaş and the Romania women's national team.

== Club career ==
On 26 January 2021, it was announced that she was transferring to Swiss club Lugano. However, after just seven games, Teodora suffered a fracture of the tibia-fibula and needed surgery. In August 2021, she came back to Romania and transferred to the recently formed team, Politehnica Timișoara.

During her time at Olimpia Cluj, the club won five consecutive league titles, two national cup titles and Meluță herself was declared Romanian Footballer of the Year twice.

In September 2024, she moved to Turkey, and signed a deal with the Istanbul-based club Fatih Vatan to play in the Super League.

== International career ==
Meluță has been capped for the Romania national team, appearing for the team during the 2019 FIFA Women's World Cup qualifying cycle. She was 15 at the time of her debut, making her the youngest footballer to ever represent Romania.
