= Margaret Domka =

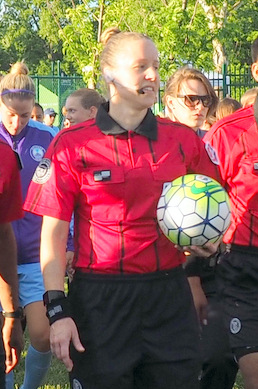
- Full name: Margaret Domka
- Born: 13 August 1979 (age 47); Oak Creek, Wisconsin, U.S.
- Other occupation: School teacher, Executive Director (U.S. Center for Mental Health & Sport)

Domestic
Years	League	Role

International
Years	League	Role
2007–2015	FIFA-listed	Referee

Margaret Domka (born August 13, 1979) is an American school teacher and soccer referee from Oak Creek, Wisconsin.

== Career ==
Domka was selected as a match official for the 2015 FIFA Women's World Cup. She was previously a FIFA international assistant referee in 2007 and 2008, and worked the 2010 and 2014 FIFA U-20 Women's World Cups. She also worked the 2012 Algarve Cup championship. Domka was formerly an NCAA Division III All-American at University of Wisconsin–Stevens Point.

Domka was the center referee for the 2014 National Women's Soccer League championship match.

Domka is the Co-founder and Executive Director at the U.S. Center for Mental Health & Sport.
