= Ferreiras =

- Civil parish
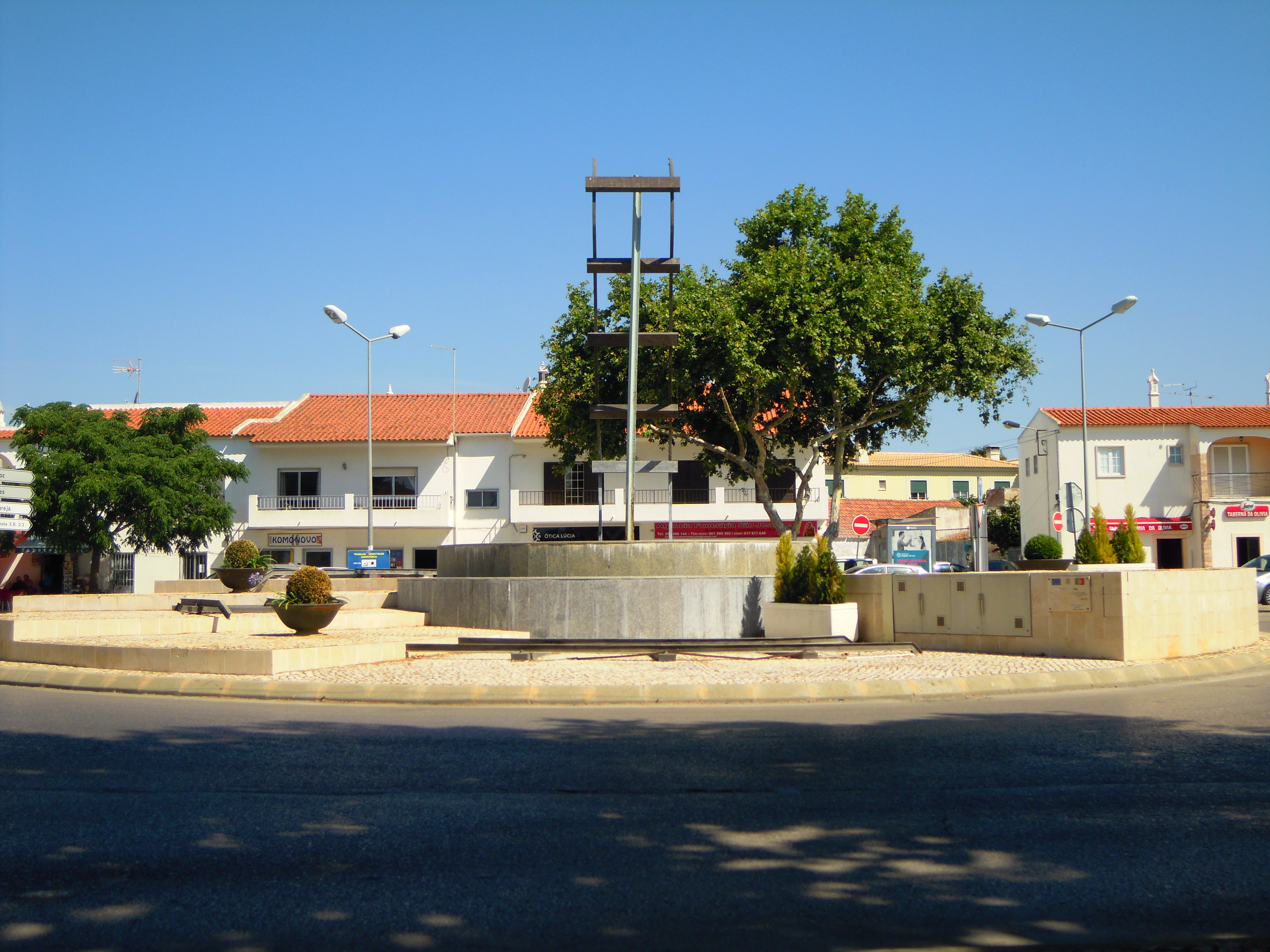
- Largo das Ferreiras in the centre of the village of Ferreiras

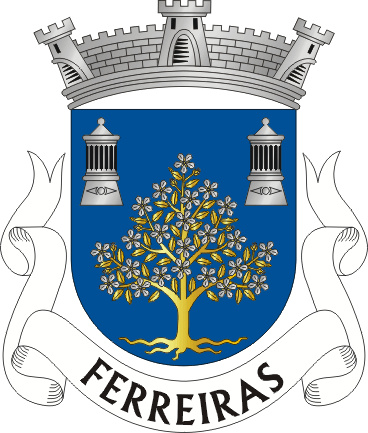
- Coat of arms

- Location in Portugal
- Coordinates: 37.127°N 8.243°W
- Country: Portugal
- Region: Algarve
- Intermunic. comm.: Algarve
- District: Faro
- Municipality: Albufeira

Area
  - Total: 20.13 km^{2} (7.77 sq mi)
- Elevation: 77 m (253 ft)

Population (2011)
  - Total: 6,406
  - Density: 318.2/km^{2} (824.2/sq mi)
- Time zone: UTC+00:00 (WET)
  - Summer (DST): UTC+01:00 (WEST)
- Postal code: 8200
- Area code: 239
- Website: http://www.ferreiras.freguesia.pt/

Ferreiras is a civil parish in the southern Portuguese municipality of Albufeira. The population in 2011 was 6,406 in an area of 20.13 km^{2} (7.77 sq mi).

== History ==
From the discovery of various archeological vestiges within the territory, including the Cerros Altos region, there is a consensus that human settlement in the area occurred in the 2nd century A.D. (including the remains of forge/foundry and inscription).

Other evidence of human occupation in the territory occurred in Ataboeira, where coins and fragments of pots, dated to the Roman occupation were discovered. Complementary evidence includes the visible Moorish influence on local architecture, such as the "typical" chimneys, the white-painted homes and Açoteias terraces.

Ferreiras was part of the parish of Albufeira until 1997, and created on 12 July of that year, with the promulgation of decree 40/97.

== Geography ==
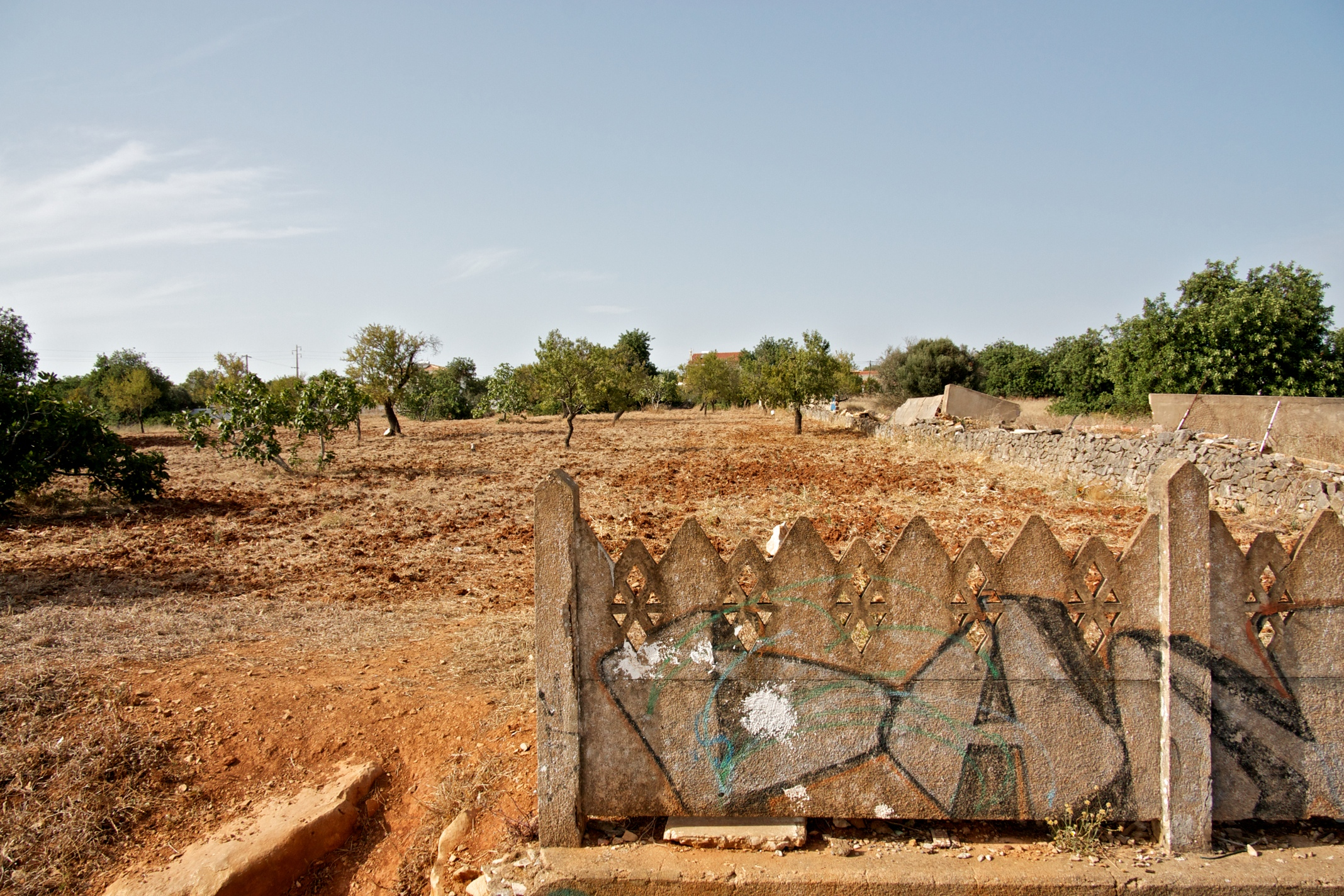
Alongside the Albufeira-Ferreira railline, showing the topography of the region

Ferreiras is one of the five civil parishes Albufeira, located within the referred coastal Algarve, occupying 2,227 hectares of the municipality's 14,066 hectare territory.

The parish is centred 5 kilometres (3.1 mi) from the coast, and includes the settlements of Alfarrobeiras, Fontainhas, Lagoas, Mosqueira, Vale Serves, Pinhal, Assumadas, Poço das Canas, Alpouvar, Malhada Velha, Cotovio and Vale Paraíso. In the east is the roadway terminus of the parish, the Ribeira de Quarteira; the waterway, which springs in the north of the parish, results from the confluence of Ribeira de Algibre and Ribeira de Alte, and extends south to Paderne, around its castle.

The limits of the new parish extend to the north, to the parish of Paderne and the Escarpão roadway until Ribeira de Quarteira; the south is confined by the Caminho de Ferro, Caminho da Mosqueira and Caminho Municipal 1285 (municipal roadway) and the Estrada Nacional 395; the eastern frontier is limited by the municipality of Loulé; and the western border by the Caminho da Ataboeira and Caminho de Poço das Canas, until the limit of the municipality of Albufeira with Silves.

== Economy ==
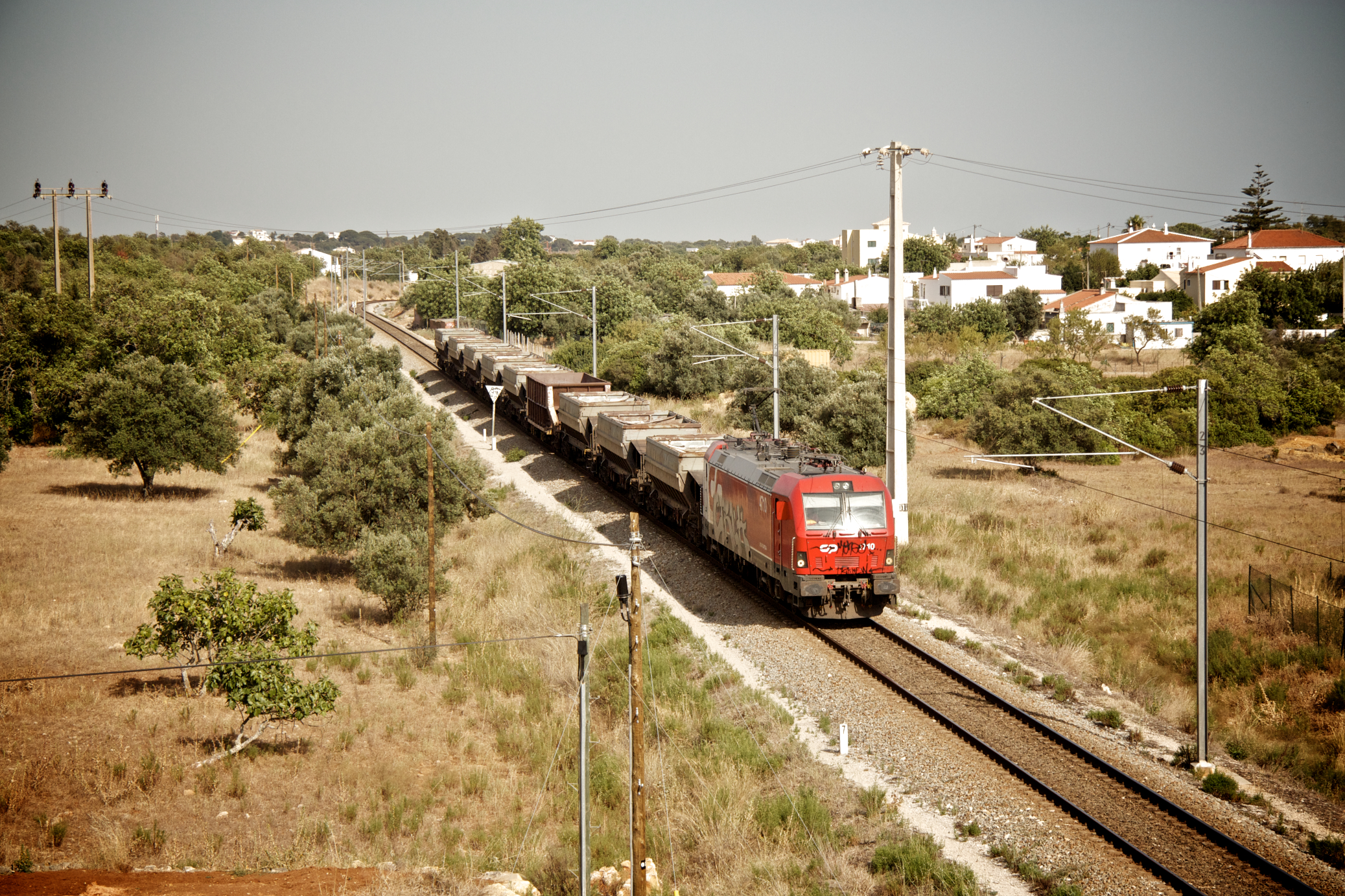
A view of the Ferreiras segment of the Algarve line

Agriculture and handicrafts constitute the two principal components of the regions economy, with handicrafts, primarily, complementing the traditional rural lifestyle. In reality, though, agriculture is becoming of secondary importance, with the demise of the older generation and lack of support for traditional agriculture. Yet, the region is still potential source of agricultural development, with optimal growing conditions and climate for the cultivation of almond, fig, olive and carob trees; many of the regions soils are classified within the national agricultural reserve (Portuguese: Reserva Agrícola Nacional) designation, under the auspices of the Serviço de Reconhecimento e Ordenamento Agrário (Agricultural Land Recognition and Planning Service).

In parallel, Ferreiras secondary and tertiary sectors, primarily concentrated on industry, have contributed, along with the rapid increase in the tourism and hotelier sectors since the 1960s.

== Architecture ==
Although Ferreiras has several historical buildings and structures, SIPA (the Sistema de Informação para a Património Arquectónico) identifies the following as classified patrimony:

- 17 June Barrio (Bairro 17 de Junho/Bairro SAAL de Ferreiras), a group of residences constructed after the 25 April Revolution, by the Serviço de Apoio Ambulatório Local created in Agosto 1974 by the central government; the SAAL was an experimental service to create an "efficient" urban area with diverse areas based on the theories of French intellectual Henri Lefebvre (1901-1991);
- Railway Station of Albufeira (Estação Ferroviária de Albufeira), a 20th-century station constructed and inaugurated in 1918, the station at Ferreiras has since rapid service since November 1926, with regular service provided in 1938 by the Empresa de Viação do Algarve.
