= China women's national football team results (1990–1999) =

This article lists the results for the China women's national football team between 1990 and 1999.

Key
Win
Draw
Defeat

== 1990 ==
18 April 1990 Friendly	France	1–1	China	Varna

20 April 1990 Friendly	China	2–0	Canada	Varna

21 April 1990 Friendly	China	2–0	France	Varna

27 September 1990 1990 Asian Games	China	5–0	Japan	Beijing

29 September 1990 1990 Asian Games	China	2–0	North Korea	Beijing

1 October 1990 1990 Asian Games	China	1–0	Chinese Taipei	Beijing

3 October 1990 1990 Asian Games	China	8–0	South Korea	Beijing

6 October 1990 1990 Asian Games	China	10–0	Hong Kong	Beijing

== 1991 ==
2 April 1991 Friendly	Soviet Union	1–0	China	Varna

5 April 1991 Friendly	China	3–1	Romania	Varna

29 May 1991 1991 AFC Women's Championship	China	3–0	Chinese Taipei	Fukuoka

31 May 1991 1991 AFC Women's Championship	China	10–1	Thailand	Fukuoka

2 June 1991 1991 AFC Women's Championship	China	10–0	South Korea	Fukuoka

6 June 1991 1991 AFC Women's Championship	China	1–0	North Korea	Fukuoka

8 June 1991 1991 AFC Women's Championship	China	5–0	Japan	Fukuoka

30 June 1991 Friendly	Germany	2–0	China	Lüdenscheid

23 July 1991 Friendly	Finland	0–6	China	Kokemäki

24 July 1991 Friendly	Finland	0–5	China	Salo

4 August 1991 Friendly	China	2–1	United States	Changchun

8 August 1991 Friendly	China	2–2	United States	Yanji

10 August 1991 Friendly	China	0–3	United States	Anshan

4 October 1991 Friendly	United States	1–2	China	Oakford

12 October 1991 Friendly	United States	2–0	China	Fairfax

16 November 1991 1991 FIFA Women's World Cup	China	4–0	Norway	Tianhe Stadium, Guangzhou
20:45 UTC+8		Report		Attendance: 65,000

19 November 1991 1991 FIFA Women's World Cup	China	2–2	Denmark	Guangdong Provincial People's Stadium, Guangzhou
19:45 UTC+8		Report		Attendance: 27,000

21 November 1991 1991 FIFA Women's World Cup	China	4–1	New Zealand	New Plaza Stadium, Foshan
19:45 UTC+8		Report		Attendance: 14,000

24 November 1991 1991 FIFA Women's World Cup	China	0–1	Sweden	Tianhe Stadium, Guangzhou
19:45 UTC+8		Report		Attendance: 55,000

== 1993 ==
17 July 1993 Friendly	United States	1–2	China

3 December 1993 1993 AFC Women's Championship	China	1–1	North Korea	Kuching

5 December 1993 1993 AFC Women's Championship	China	6–0	South Korea	Kuching

7 December 1993 1993 AFC Women's Championship	China	7–0	Malaysia	Kuching

10 December 1993 1993 AFC Women's Championship	China	3–1	Japan	Kuching

12 December 1993 1993 AFC Women's Championship	North Korea	0–3	China	Kuching

== 1994 ==
25 July 1994 Friendly	Canada	1–4	China	Ottawa

29 July 1994 Friendly	China	3–2	Norway	Harrisburg

3 August 1994 Friendly	United States	1–0	China	Piscataway

6 August 1994 Friendly	China	3–2	Germany	Veterans Stadium, New Britain

3 October 1994 1994 Asian Games	Chinese Taipei	0–5	China	Fukuyama Takegahana Stadium, Fukuyama
15:00 UTC+9

7 October 1994 1994 Asian Games	China	2–0	South Korea	Fukuyama Takegahana Stadium, Fukuyama
15:00 UTC+9

10 October 1994 1994 Asian Games	China	1–1	Japan	Fukuyama Takegahana Stadium, Fukuyama
15:00 UTC+9

12 October 1994 1994 Asian Games	Japan	0–2	China	Fukuyama Takegahana Stadium, Fukuyama
18:00 UTC+9

== 1995 ==
25 April 1995 Friendly	Norway	2–1	China	Oslo

27 April 1995 Friendly	Sweden	1–1	China	Norrköping

25 May 1995 Friendly	Germany	3–1	China

6 June 1995 1995 FIFA Women's World Cup	United States	3–3	China	Strömvallen, Gävle
19:00 UTC+2		Report		Attendance: 4,635

8 June 1995 1995 FIFA Women's World Cup	China	4–2	Australia	Arosvallen, Västerås
19:00 UTC+2		Report		Attendance: 1,500

10 June 1995 1995 FIFA Women's World Cup	China	3–1	Denmark	Arosvallen, Västerås
16:00 UTC+2		Report		Attendance: 1,619

13 June 1995 1995 FIFA Women's World Cup	Sweden	1–1 (a.e.t.) (3–4 p)	China	Olympia, Helsingborg
20:15 UTC+2		Report		Attendance: 7,537

15 June 1995 1995 FIFA Women's World Cup	Germany	1–0	China	Olympia, Helsingborg
20:15 UTC+2		Report		Attendance: 3,693

17 June 1995 1995 FIFA Women's World Cup	China	0–2	United States	Strömvallen, Gävle
16:00 UTC+2		Report		Attendance: 4,335

24 September 1995 1995 AFC Women's Championship	China	21–0	Philippines	Kota Kinabalu

26 September 1995 1995 AFC Women's Championship	China	12–0	Hong Kong	Kota Kinabalu

28 September 1995 1995 AFC Women's Championship	China	7–0	Kazakhstan	Kota Kinabalu

30 September 1995 1995 AFC Women's Championship	China	4–0	South Korea	Kota Kinabalu

2 October 1995 1995 AFC Women's Championship	China	2–0	Japan	Kota Kinabalu

== 1996 ==
11 March 1996 1996 Algarve Cup	Norway	4–1	China	Silves

13 March 1996 1996 Algarve Cup	China	1–0	Russia	Vila Real de Santo António

15 March 1996 1996 Algarve Cup	China	5–0	Portugal	Quarteira

17 March 1996 1996 Algarve Cup	China	2–1	Denmark	Quarteira

11 May 1996 Friendly	China	3–0	Japan	Salem

15 May 1996 Friendly	China	5–0	Canada	Veterans Stadium, New Britain

18 May 1996 Friendly	United States	1–0	China	Washington

11 July 1996 Friendly	China	1–0	Australia	Bradenton

14 July 1996 Friendly	China	2–1	Australia	Bradenton

21 July 1996 1996 Summer Olympics	Sweden	0–2	China	Miami Orange Bowl, Miami
16:00 UTC-4		Report		Attendance: 46,724

23 July 1996 1996 Summer Olympics	Denmark	1–5	China	Miami Orange Bowl, Miami
18:00 UTC-4		Report		Attendance: 34,871

25 July 1996 1996 Summer Olympics	United States	0–0	China	Miami Orange Bowl, Miami
18:30 UTC-4		Report		Attendance: 55,650

28 July 1996 1996 Summer Olympics	China	3–2	Brazil	Sanford Stadium, Athens
15:00 UTC-4		Report		Attendance: 64,196

1 August 1996 1996 Summer Olympics	China	1–2	United States	Sanford Stadium, Athens
20:30 UTC-4		Report		Attendance: 76,489

== 1997 ==
10 March 1997 1997 Algarve Cup	China	3–0	Portugal	Faro

12 March 1997 1997 Algarve Cup	China	1–0	Netherlands	Portimão

14 March 1997 1997 Algarve Cup	China	2–0	Sweden	Albufeira

16 March 1997 1997 Algarve Cup	Norway	1–0	China	Loulé

20 March 1997 Friendly	Germany	2–2	China	Euskirchen

23 March 1997 Friendly	Germany	1–1	China	Warendorf

15 June 1997 Friendly	Japan	0–0	China	Osaka

16 November 1997 Friendly	Australia	0–3	China	Lismore

21 November 1997 Friendly	New Zealand	1–3	China	Canberra

23 November 1997 Friendly	Australia	2–1	China	Canberra

5 December 1997 1997 AFC Women's Championship	China	3–1	North Korea	Guangzhou

7 December 1997 1997 AFC Women's Championship	China	8–0	Uzbekistan	Guangzhou

9 December 1997 1997 AFC Women's Championship	China	16–0	Philippines	Guangzhou

12 December 1997 1997 AFC Women's Championship	China	10–0	Chinese Taipei	Guangzhou

14 December 1997 1997 AFC Women's Championship	China	2–0	North Korea	Guangzhou

== 1998 ==
18 January 1998 1998 Four Nations Tournament	Norway	2–1	China	Guangzhou

21 January 1998 1998 Four Nations Tournament	United States	0–0	China	Guangzhou

24 January 1998 1998 Four Nations Tournament	China	4–1	Sweden	Guangzhou

15 March 1998 1998 Algarve Cup	Norway	0–1	China	Olhão

17 March 1998 1998 Algarve Cup	United States	4–1	China	Loulé

19 March 1998 1998 Algarve Cup	China	1–0	Finland	Lagos

21 March 1998 1998 Algarve Cup	China	3–2	Netherlands	Lagoa

25 March 1998 Friendly	Italy	0–0	China	Termoli

18 July 1998 Friendly	Canada	1–2	China	Montreal

21 July 1998 Friendly	Canada	0–4	China	Ottawa

25 July 1998 1998 Goodwill Games	China	1–1 (4–2 p)	Norway	Hempstead

27 July 1998 1998 Goodwill Games	United States	2–0	China	Hempstead

7 December 1998 1998 Asian Games	Chinese Taipei	0–5	China	Thammasat Stadium, Rangsit
16:00 UTC+7

9 December 1998 1998 Asian Games	China	3–0	South Korea	Thammasat Stadium, Rangsit
14:00 UTC+7

11 December 1998 1998 Asian Games	India	0–16	China	Thai-Japanese Stadium, Bangkok
14:00 UTC+7

15 December 1998 1998 Asian Games	China	3–0	Japan	Thupatemi Stadium, Pathum Thani
17:30 UTC+7

17 December 1998 1998 Asian Games	China	1–0 (a.e.t.)	North Korea	Thupatemi Stadium, Pathum Thani
17:30 UTC+7

== 1999 ==
6 March 1999 Friendly	China	2–1	Ghana	Beijing

9 March 1999 Friendly	China	2–1	Ghana	Beijing

14 March 1999 1999 Algarve Cup	China	4–0	Portugal	Faro

16 March 1999 1999 Algarve Cup	China	2–0	Denmark	Olhão

18 March 1999 1999 Algarve Cup	Australia	0–2	China	Albufeira

20 March 1999 1999 Algarve Cup	China	2–1	United States	Loulé

25 March 1999 Friendly	Germany	0–3	China	Holzwickede

28 March 1999 Friendly	Germany	4–1	China	Hamburg

4 April 1999 Friendly	Netherlands	0–1	China	Bennekom

22 April 1999 Friendly	United States	2–1	China	Hershey

25 April 1999 Friendly	United States	1–2	China

12 June 1999 Friendly	Nigeria	4–3	China
		Report

19 June 1999 1999 FIFA Women's World Cup	China	2–1	Sweden	Spartan Stadium, San Jose
17:00 UTC−7		Report		Attendance: 23,298

23 June 1999 1999 FIFA Women's World Cup	China	7–0	Ghana	Civic Stadium, Portland
20:30 UTC−7		Report		Attendance: 17,668

26 June 1999 1999 FIFA Women's World Cup	China	3–1	Australia	Giants Stadium, East Rutherford
14:30 UTC−4		Report		Attendance: 29,401

30 June 1999 1999 FIFA Women's World Cup	China	2–0	Russia	Spartan Stadium, San Jose
17:00 UTC−7		Report		Attendance: 21,411

4 July 1999 1999 FIFA Women's World Cup	Norway	0–5	China	Foxboro Stadium, Foxborough
19:30 UTC−4		Report		Attendance: 8,986

10 July 1999 1999 FIFA Women's World Cup	United States	0–0 (5–4 p)	China	Rose Bowl, Pasadena
12:50 UTC−7		Report		Attendance: 90,185

28 October 1999 Friendly	China	3–1	Australia	Zhuhai

31 October 1999 Friendly	China	4–2	Australia	Xiamen

7 November 1999 1999 AFC Women's Championship	China	5–2	South Korea	Bacolod

9 November 1999 1999 AFC Women's Championship	China	15–0	Guam	Bacolod

11 November 1999 1999 AFC Women's Championship	Kazakhstan	0–9	China	Bacolod

13 November 1999 1999 AFC Women's Championship	China	12–0	Hong Kong	Bacolod

19 November 1999 1999 AFC Women's Championship	North Korea	0–3	China	Bacolod

21 November 1999 1999 AFC Women's Championship	China	3–0	Chinese Taipei	Bacolod
