= Malin Andersson =

Swedish footballer (born 1973)

Personal information
- Full name: Malin Elisabeth Andersson
- Date of birth: 4 May 1973 (age 53)
- Place of birth: Kristianstad, Sweden
- Height: 1.71 m (5 ft 7 in)
- Position: Midfielder

Youth career
- 1987: Arkelstorps IF

Senior career*
| Years | Team | Apps | (Gls) |
| 1988–1993 | Wä IF | | |
| 1994–2001 | Älvsjö AIK | | |
| 2001–2005 | Malmö FF | | |

International career^{‡}
| 1990 | Sweden U17 | 4 | (3) |
| 1993 | Sweden U20 | 19 | (0) |
| 1994–2005 | Sweden | 151 | (39) |
- * Club domestic league appearances and goals ‡ National team caps and goals as of 2005

Malin Elisabeth Andersson (born 4 May 1973) is a Swedish women's football player.

== Club career ==
Domestically, she played for Malmö FF in the Damallsvenskan, and won the Diamantbollen as Sweden's top female footballer in 1995.

== International career ==
In an international career lasting from 1994 to 2005, Andersson appeared in 151 international matches for Sweden. At the time of her retirement, Kristin Bengtsson was the only other player in Swedish football history to have amassed 150 caps. She competed in the 1995, 1999, and 2003 Women's World Cups, netting three goals for Sweden overall. She also competed for Sweden in the 1996, 2000 and 2004 Olympics.

Malin Andersson competed in three FIFA Women's World Cups: Sweden 1995, USA 1999, USA 2003. She also played in three Olympic tournaments: the 1996 Atlanta Games, the 2000 Sydney Games, and the 2004 Athens Games.

She appeared in all but two of her team's matches across those tournaments, and played every minute for Sweden at the 1995 and 1999 World Cups and at the 2000 Olympics. In the 1995 World Cup, she scored both the first and the final goals for Sweden as they came back from an 0–2 deficit vs Germany to win 3–2 on the second day of match play. Her 53' goal against Brazil in the Quarter-Finals of the 2003 World Cup proved to be the winning goal in that match, a crucial victory in Sweden's march to a second-place finish.

Malin Andersson appeared in four editions of the European Championship: 1995 (various locations), Norway/Sweden 1997, Germany 2001, and England 2005. Her squad finished second in the 1995 and 2001 tournaments.

== Career statistics ==
=== International goals ===
| No. | Date | Venue | Opponent | Score | Result | Competition | Ref. |
|---|---|---|---|---|---|---|---|
| 1. | 22 May 1994 | Ozolnieki Stadium, Ozolnieki, Latvia | Latvia | 4–0 | 5–0 | UEFA Women's Euro 1995 qualifying | |
| 2. | 7 September 1994 | Meeschestadion, Wolfenbüttel, Germany | Germany | 1–3 | 1–3 | Friendly | |
| 3. | 14 March 1995 | Estádio Municipal de Lagos, Lagos, Portugal | Italy | 4–0 | 4–0 | 1995 Algarve Cup | |
| 4. | 16 March 1995 | Estádio José Arcanjo, Olhão, Portugal | Netherlands | 1–0 | 2–1 | 1995 Algarve Cup | |
| 5. | 26 March 1995 | Fritz-Walter-Stadion, Kaiserslautern, Germany | Germany | 1–0 | 2–3 | UEFA Women's Euro 1995 | |
| 6. | 27 May 1995 | Olympia, Helsingborg, Sweden | Australia | 2–0 | 5–0 | Friendly | |
| 7. | 7 June 1995 | Olympia, Helsingborg, Sweden | Germany | 1–2 | 3–2 | 1995 FIFA Women's World Cup | |
| 8. | 7 June 1995 | Olympia, Helsingborg, Sweden | Germany | 3–2 | 3–2 | 1995 FIFA Women's World Cup | |
| 9. | 15 October 1995 | Domarvallen, Smålandsstenar, Sweden | Romania | 4–0 | 8–0 | UEFA Women's Euro 1997 qualifying | |
| 10. | 13 March 1996 | Estádio Municipal de Lagos, Lagos, Portugal | Finland | 3–0 | 7–0 | 1996 Algarve Cup | |
| 11. | 13 March 1996 | Estádio Municipal de Lagos, Lagos, Portugal | Finland | 4–0 | 7–0 | 1996 Algarve Cup | |
| 12. | 13 March 1996 | Estádio Municipal de Lagos, Lagos, Portugal | Finland | 7–0 | 7–0 | 1996 Algarve Cup | |
| 13. | 15 March 1996 | Estádio José Arcanjo, Olhão, Portugal | Iceland | 1–0 | 1–0 | 1996 Algarve Cup | |
| 14. | 15 July 1996 | Miami, United States | Japan | 3–1 | 3–1 | Friendly | |
| 15. | 31 August 1996 | Arosvallen, Västerås, Sweden | Denmark | 1–0 | 2–0 | UEFA Women's Euro 1997 qualifying | |
| 16. | 5 July 1997 | Tingvalla IP, Karlstad, Sweden | France | 1–0 | 3–0 | UEFA Women's Euro 1997 | |
| 17. | 28 September 1997 | Studenternas IP, Uppsala, Sweden | Ukraine | 3–1 | 3–2 | 1999 FIFA Women's World Cup qualification | |
| 18. | 30 October 1997 | Heywood Stadium, Chattanooga, United States | United States | 1–2 | 1–3 | Friendly | |
| 19. | 1 November 1997 | Finley Stadium, Chattanooga, United States | United States | 1–3 | 1–3 | Friendly | |
| 20. | 17 March 1998 | Estádio Dr. Francisco Vieira, Silves, Portugal | Portugal | 1–0 | 2–0 | 1998 Algarve Cup | |
| 21. | 16 March 1999 | Estádio Municipal de Quarteira, Quarteira, Portugal | Norway | 1–1 | 1–2 | 1999 Algarve Cup | |
| 22. | 7 November 1999 | Estadio Municipal de Plasencia, Plasencia, Spain | Spain | 4–2 | 5–2 | UEFA Women's Euro 2001 qualifying | |
| 23. | 7 November 1999 | Estadio Municipal de Plasencia, Plasencia, Spain | Spain | 5–2 | 5–2 | UEFA Women's Euro 2001 qualifying | |
| 24. | 7 January 2000 | North Sydney Oval, Sydney, Australia | Australia | 2–0 | 2–0 | 2000 Australia Cup | |
| 25. | 13 January 2000 | Hindmarsh Stadium, Adelaide, Australia | Czech Republic | 1–0 | 2–0 | 2000 Australia Cup | |
| 26. | 16 September 2000 | Sydney Football Stadium, Sydney, Australia | Australia | 1–1 | 1–1 | 2000 Summer Olympics | |
| 27. | 5 November 2000 | ISS Stadion, Vantaa, Finland | Finland | 1–0 | 5–2 | UEFA Women's Euro 2001 qualifying | |
| 28. | 11 April 2001 | Stade de l'Aube, Troyes, France | France | 1–1 | 1–2 | Friendly | |
| 29. | 9 September 2001 | Gammliavallen, Umeå, Sweden | Finland | 3–1 | 8–1 | 2003 FIFA Women's World Cup qualification | |
| 30. | 30 September 2001 | Malmö IP, Malmö, Sweden | Denmark | 3–1 | 4–1 | 2003 FIFA Women's World Cup qualification | |
| 31. | 25 January 2002 | La Manga Club Football Stadium, La Manga, Spain | England | 5–0 | 5–0 | Friendly | |
| 32. | 7 March 2002 | Estádio de São Luís, Faro, Portugal | Germany | 2–0 | 2–1 | 2002 Algarve Cup | |
| 33. | 9 June 2002 | Ballerup Idrætspark, Ballerup, Denmark | Denmark | 1–0 | 1–2 | 2003 FIFA Women's World Cup qualification | |
| 34. | 12 October 2002 | Värendsvallen, Växjö, Sweden | Poland | 8–0 | 8–0 | Friendly | |
| 35. | 29 January 2003 | Belconnen Soccer Centre, Canberra, Australia | South Korea | 2–0 | 8–0 | 2003 Australia Cup | |
| 36. | 9 August 2003 | Tunavallen, Eskilstuna, Sweden | Finland | 1–0 | 2–1 | UEFA Women's Euro 2005 qualifying | |
| 37. | 7 September 2003 | Malmö IP, Malmö, Sweden | Denmark | 1–0 | 3–1 | Friendly | |
| 38. | 1 October 2003 | Gillette Stadium, Foxborough, United States | Brazil | 2–1 | 2–1 | 2003 FIFA Women's World Cup | |
| 39. | 18 March 2004 | Estádio Municipal de Lagos, Lagos, Portugal | United States | 1–0 | 3–1 | 2004 Algarve Cup | |

== Honours ==
Älvsjö AIK

- Damallsvenskan: 1995, 1996, 1997, 1998, 1999
- Svenska Cupen: 1996, 1999

Sweden

- FIFA Women's World Cup runner-up: 2003
- Summer Olympics fourth place: 2004
- UEFA Women's Championship runner-up: 1995, 2001; fourth place: 1997, 2005
- Algarve Cup: 1995, 2001
- Four Nations Tournament third place: 2004; fourth place: 1998
- Australia Cup: 2003

Individual

- Diamantbollen: 1995
