= Millas Mirakel =

Swedish pop music group

- Origin: Halmstad, Sweden
- Genres: pop
- Years active: late 1980s-
- Past members: Camilla Andersson, Morgan Hjalmarsson

Millas Mirakel was a pop group from Halmstad, Sweden, scoring chart successes in Sweden during the late 1980s. One of their more famous songs were Rytmen av ett regn.

== Discography ==
=== Albums ===
- 1987 - Stillbilder
- 1989 - Hög puls!

=== Singles ===
- 1987 - Rytmen av ett regn / Nyfallen gloria
- 1989 - Snälla flickor kommer till himmelen...vi andra kommer hur långt som helst / Tom ficka
- 1989 - Ensam i september / Minnet av din kropp
