= 1997 Algarve Cup =

International women's football tournament

Tournament details
- Host country: Portugal
- Teams: 8 (from 2 confederations)
- Venue(s): 9

Final positions
- Champions: Norway (3rd title)
- Runners-up: China
- Third place: Sweden

Tournament statistics
- Matches played: 16
- Goals scored: 41 (2.56 per match)
- Best player(s): (Norway) Marianne Pettersen

The 1997 Algarve Cup was the fourth edition of the Algarve Cup, an invitational women's association football tournament. It took place between 10 and 16 March 1997 in Portugal with Norway winning the event for the third time in its history, defeating the PR China, 1-0 in the final-game. Sweden ended up third defeating Denmark, 6-5 following a penalty shootout, in the third prize-game.

== Format ==
The Netherlands returned to the tournament, replacing Russia.

The eight invited teams were split into two groups that played a round-robin tournament. On completion of this, the fourth placed teams in each group would play each other to determine seventh and eighth place, the third placed teams in each group would play each other to decide fifth and sixth place, the second placed teams in each group would play to determine third and fourth place and the winners of each group would compete for first and second place overall.

Points awarded in the group stage followed the standard formula of three points for a win, one point for a draw and zero points for a loss.

== Group A ==
Team	Pts	Pld	W	D	L	GF	GA	GD
Norway	9	3	3	0	0	14	1	+13
Denmark	6	3	2	0	1	6	4	+2
Finland	3	3	1	0	2	3	7	−4
Iceland	0	3	0	0	3	1	12	−11

March 10, 1997

Denmark	4–1	Iceland

Silves

March 10, 1997

Norway	5–1	Finland
Aarønes 6'; 46' (o.g.); Pettersen 79'; Gulbrandsen 82'; 89' (o.g.)		Haikari 32'

Silves

March 12, 1997

Norway	6–0	Iceland
Frustøl 14'; Pettersen 16'; Lehn 34'; Knudsen 36'; Gulbrandsen 68'; Riise 74'

Olhão

March 12, 1997

Denmark	2–0	Finland

Olhão

March 14, 1997

Norway	3–0	Denmark
Lehn 26'; Pettersen 47', 62'

Alvor

March 14, 1997

Finland	2–0	Iceland

Montechoro, Albufeira

== Group B ==
Team	Pts	Pld	W	D	L	GF	GA	GD
China	9	3	3	0	0	6	0	+6
Sweden	6	3	2	0	1	8	2	+6
Netherlands	3	3	1	0	2	1	5	−4
Portugal	0	3	0	0	3	0	8	−8

March 10, 1997

China	3–0	Portugal

Faro

March 10, 1997

Sweden	4–0	Netherlands
Svensson 13'; Bengtsson 37'; Jonsson 57'; Andersson 78'	SvFF report (in Swedish)

Faro

March 12, 1997

China	1–0	Netherlands

Portimão

March 12, 1997

Sweden	4–0	Portugal
Andersson 37'; Swedberg 55', 84'; Allberg 73'	SvFF report (in Swedish)

Lagoa

March 14, 1997

China	2–0	Sweden
Liu Ying 7'; Zhao Lihong 48'	SvFF report (in Swedish)

Albufeira

March 14, 1997

Netherlands	1–0	Portugal

Montechoro, Albufeira

== Seventh Place ==
March 16, 1997

Iceland	0–0 (4–3) (PSO)	Portugal

Faro

Portugal finished bottom of their group for the fourth year in a row and lost the seventh place play-off on penalties to Iceland.

== Fifth Place ==
March 16, 1997

Netherlands	1–0	Finland

Faro

== Third Place ==
March 16, 1997

Sweden	0–0 (6–5) (PSO)	Denmark
	SvFF Report (in Swedish)

Loulé

1996 runners up Sweden finished in third place overall after winning a penalty shootout following a goalless game.

== Final ==
March 16, 1997

Norway	1–0	China
75' (pen.) Riise

Loulé

Norway won the competition for the third time thanks to Hege Riise's 75th-minute penalty.

== Awards ==
1997 Algarve Cup

Norway
Third title

Best player
(Norway) Marianne Pettersen
