= Maria João Xavier =

Portuguese footballer

Personal information
- Full name: Maria João Fernandes Clemente Lopes Xavier
- Date of birth: 8 March 1971 (age 55)
- Position: Midfielder

Senior career*
Years	Team	Apps	(Gls)
- Sporting CP

International career^{‡}
1994–2003	Portugal	76	(4)
- * Club domestic league appearances and goals ‡ National team caps and goals as of 10 May 2003

Maria João Fernandes Clemente Lopes Xavier (born 8 March 1971) is a Portuguese former footballer who played as a midfielder. She has been a member of the Portugal women's national team.

== International goals ==
Scores and results list Portugal's goal tally first

Date	Venue	Opponent	Score	Result	Competition	Ref.
17 March 1996	Hotel Montechoro Sports Complex, Albufeira, Portugal	Finland	2–0	3–0	1996 Algarve Cup	
1 April 2000	Stade des Trois-Chênes, Thônex, Switzerland	Switzerland	1–0	2–0	UEFA Women's Euro 2001 qualifying	
11 March 2001	Estádio Municipal, Lagos, Portugal	Sweden	1–0	1–4	2001 Algarve Cup	
