= Merete Pedersen =

Danish footballer (born 1973)

Personal information
- Date of birth: 30 June 1973 (age 53)
- Place of birth: Sæby, Denmark
- Position: Striker

Youth career
- 1977–: Jerlev
- Ammitsbøl
- 1986–: Jelling

Senior career*
Years	Team	Apps	(Gls)
–1995	Vejle B	77	
1995–1999	OB		
1999–2000	Siegen		
2000–2003	OB		
2003–2006	Torres		
2006–2009	OB		

International career
1993–2009	Denmark	136	(65)
- * Club domestic league appearances and goals

Merete Pedersen (born 30 June 1973) is a Danish international footballer who played as a striker for the Danish national team. She played for clubs in Denmark, Germany, and Italy. Pedersen represented the Danish national team for fifteen years, taking part in the 1999 and 2007 World Cups, the 1996 Summer Olympics and the 1997, 2001 and 2005 European Championships. She quit the national team for a time following the disappointment of the missed qualification for the 2007 World Cup in China. Pedersen won 136 caps with and scored 65 for the Danish national team. She was inducted into the Danish Football Hall of Fame in 2024, the first OB player to receive the honour.

== Club career ==
Pedersen started playing football at Jerlev IF at four years old. She subsequently played for Ammitsbøl, and at 13 joined Jelling, before starting her professional career with Elitedivisionen club Vejle B in the '90s. In 1995 Pedersen moved to another Elitedivisionen club, OB, where she played until 1999. Pedersen made her first move abroad to German Bundesliga club TSV Siegen in 1999 where she played for one season before returning to OB in 2000 for another three seasons. Pedersen moved abroad once more in 2003 to sign with Italian Serie A club Torres CF, whom she would represent until 2006. Following this, Pedersen concluded her playing career with a final return to OB in 2006 where she played until 2009. Pedersen participated in the UEFA Women's Cup while with both Odense and Torres.

== International career ==
In September 2008 Pedersen scored the only goal in Denmark's 1–0 win over Ukraine to secure her country's place at UEFA Women's Euro 2009. It was her tenth goal of the qualifying series. Ahead of the final tournament she retired from international football, stating that she did not wish to sit on the substitute's bench as a 36–year–old and would prefer to concentrate on her career as a teacher. With 65 goals in 136 senior internationals she was the team's all–time top goalscorer, before her record was broken by Pernille Harder on 16 September 2021 with Harder's 66th goal.

== International goals ==
No.	Date	Venue	Opponent	Score	Result	Competition
1.
2.	3 July 1997	Lillestrøm, Norway	Italy	2–1	2–2	UEFA Women's Euro 1997
3.	18 March 1999	Albufeira, Portugal	Portugal	2–0	5–0	1999 Algarve Cup
4.	20 March 1999	Loulé, Portugal	Norway	2–2	2–2 (1–4 p)	1999 Algarve Cup
5.	29 September 1999	Odense, Denmark	Russia	1–0	2–4	UEFA Women's Euro 2001 qualifying
6.	10 November 1999	Odense, Denmark	Serbia	1–0	6–0	UEFA Women's Euro 2001 qualifying
7.	10 November 1999	Odense, Denmark	Serbia	4–0	6–0	UEFA Women's Euro 2001 qualifying
8.	16 March 2000	lagos, Portugal	Portugal	?–0	2–0	2000 Algarve Cup
9.	18 March 2000	Lagoa, Portugal	Canada	1–1	2–3	2000 Algarve Cup
10.	24 May 2000	Novi Sad, Serbia	Serbia	3–0	8–0	UEFA Women's Euro 2001 qualifying
11.	13 March 2001	Olhão, Portugal	Finland	3–0	6–0	2001 Algarve Cup
12.	30 September 2001	Malmö, Sweden	Sweden	1–1	1–4	2003 FIFA Women's World Cup qualification
13.	13 October 2001	Vantaa, Finland	Finland	3–0	6–0	2003 FIFA Women's World Cup qualification
14.	13 October 2001	Vantaa, Finland	Finland	6–0	6–0	2003 FIFA Women's World Cup qualification
15.	20 April 2002	Gossau, Switzerland	Switzerland	3–1	4–1	2003 FIFA Women's World Cup qualification
16.	18 April 2004	Lucena, Spain	Spain	1–0	1–0	UEFA Women's Euro 2005 qualifying
17.	26 September 2004	Aalborg, Denmark	Belgium	1–0	6–0	UEFA Women's Euro 2005 qualifying
18.	26 September 2004	Aalborg, Denmark	Belgium	2–0	6–0	UEFA Women's Euro 2005 qualifying
19.	26 September 2004	Aalborg, Denmark	Belgium	3–0	6–0	UEFA Women's Euro 2005 qualifying
20.	26 September 2004	Aalborg, Denmark	Belgium	6–0	6–0	UEFA Women's Euro 2005 qualifying
21.	29 September 2004	Katwijk, Netherlands	Netherlands	1–0	5–1	UEFA Women's Euro 2005 qualifying
22.	15 March 2005	Algarve, Portugal	Norway	1–0	1–2	2005 Algarve Cup
23.	27 August 2005	Słupsk, Poland	Poland	1–0	5–1	2007 FIFA Women's World Cup qualification
24.	27 August 2005	Słupsk, Poland	Poland	2–0	5–1	2007 FIFA Women's World Cup qualification
25.	27 August 2005	Słupsk, Poland	Poland	4–0	5–1	2007 FIFA Women's World Cup qualification
26.	27 August 2005	Słupsk, Poland	Poland	5–0	5–1	2007 FIFA Women's World Cup qualification
27.	25 September 2005	Farum, Denmark	Belgium	1–0	3–0	2007 FIFA Women's World Cup qualification
28.	25 September 2005	Farum, Denmark	Belgium	2–0	3–0	2007 FIFA Women's World Cup qualification
29.	26 March 2006	Ath, Belgium	Belgium	1–0	2–0	2007 FIFA Women's World Cup qualification
30.	26 March 2006	Ath, Belgium	Belgium	2–0	2–0	2007 FIFA Women's World Cup qualification
31.	27 April 2006	Viborg, Denmark	Spain	1–0	5–0	2007 FIFA Women's World Cup qualification
32.	7 May 2006	Brøndbyvester, Denmark	Poland	1–0	3–1	2007 FIFA Women's World Cup qualification
33.	7 March 2007	Silves, Portugal	France	4–0	4–0	2007 Algarve Cup
34.	27 October 2007	Viborg, Denmark	Portugal	1–0	5–1	UEFA Women's Euro 2009 qualifying
35.	27 October 2007	Viborg, Denmark	Portugal	5–1	5–1	UEFA Women's Euro 2009 qualifying
36.	31 October 2007	Perth, Scotland	Scotland	1–0	1–0	UEFA Women's Euro 2009 qualifying
37.	5 March 2008	Faro, Portugal	Germany	1–0	1–0	2008 Algarve Cup
38.	27 April 2008	Viborg, Denmark	Scotland	2–1	2–1	UEFA Women's Euro 2009 qualifying
39.	8 May 2008	Fão, Portugal	Portugal	3–0	4–0	UEFA Women's Euro 2009 qualifying
40.	8 May 2008	Fão, Portugal	Portugal	4–0	4–0	UEFA Women's Euro 2009 qualifying
41.	28 May 2008	Viborg, Denmark	Slovakia	2–0	6–1	UEFA Women's Euro 2009 qualifying
42.	28 May 2008	Viborg, Denmark	Slovakia	4–1	6–1	UEFA Women's Euro 2009 qualifying
43.	28 May 2008	Viborg, Denmark	Slovakia	6–1	6–1	UEFA Women's Euro 2009 qualifying
44.	1 October 2008	Viborg, Denmark	Ukraine	1–0	1–0	UEFA Women's Euro 2009 qualifying
45.	6 March 2009	Lagos, Portugal	Norway	2–0	2–0	2009 Algarve Cup

== See also ==
- List of women's footballers with 100 or more international caps
