= Unni Lehn =

Norwegian footballer (born 1977)

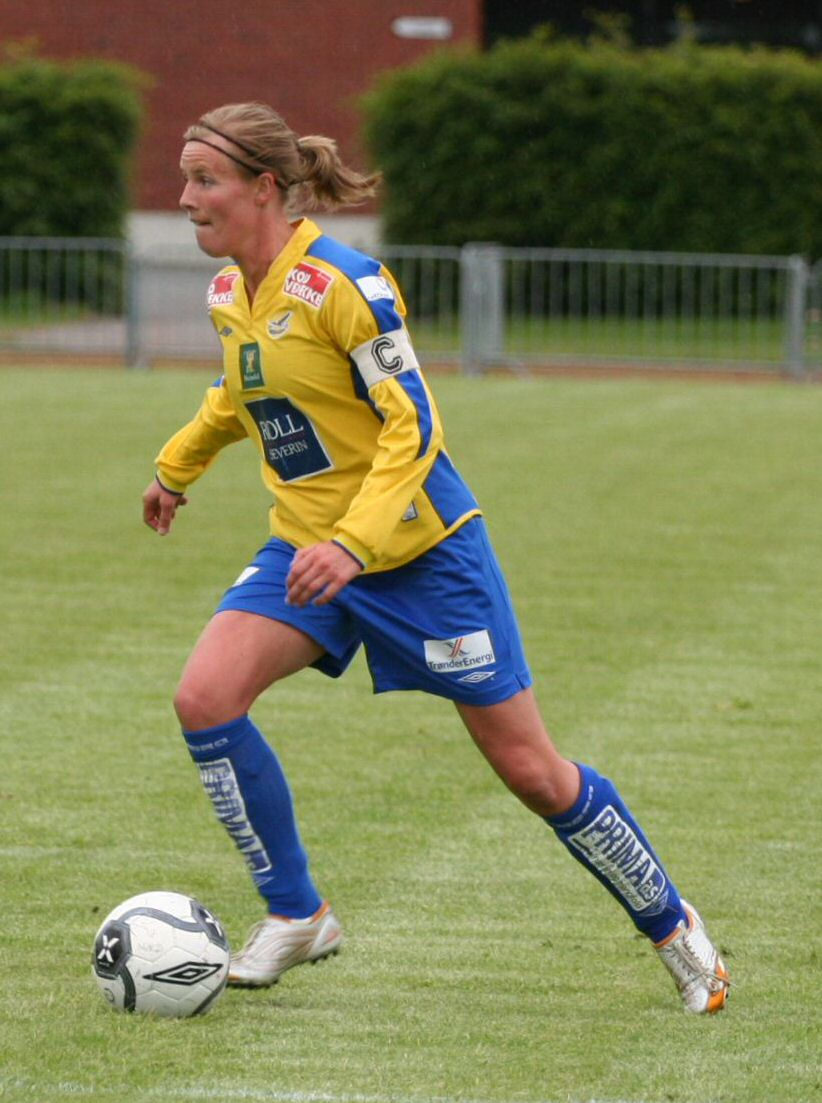

Personal information
- Full name: Unni Lehn
- Date of birth: 7 June 1977 (age 49)
- Place of birth: Melhus Municipality, Norway
- Position: Midfielder

Team information
- Current team: Trondheims-Ørn
- Number: 10

Youth career
- Melhus

Senior career*
Years	Team	Apps	(Gls)
–1994	Melhus		
1994–2001	Trondheims-Ørn		
2001–2004	Carolina Courage		
2004–2007	Trondheims-Ørn		

International career^{‡}
1992–1993	Norway under-16	11	(2)
1994–1996	Norway under-20	19	(9)
1996–2007	Norway	134	(24)
Medal record
Women's football
Representing Norway
Gold medal – first place	2000 Sydney	Team competition
- * Club domestic league appearances and goals ‡ National team caps and goals as of 19 December 2007

Unni Lehn (born 7 June 1977) is a retired Norwegian football midfielder. She has made 133 appearances for Norway's national team. In 2000, Lehn played 86 minutes in the Olympic Final in Sydney, where Norway defeated the US in extra time to win the gold medal. She resides in Trondheim and played for Trondheims-Ørn from 1994 onwards, making over 400 appearances for the club during which they won the Norwegian league title and the Norwegian Cup competition several times. From 2001 to 2003, she played in the US with Carolina Courage. She announced her retirement from football at the end of 2007.

Unni Lehn has an economics degree and is continuing working at the BN Bank in Trondheim.

== International goals ==
No.	Date	Venue	Opponent	Score	Result	Competition
1.	12 March 1997	Olhão, Portugal	Iceland	3–0	6–0	1997 Algarve Cup
2.	14 March 1997	Alvor, Portugal	Denmark	1–0	3–0	1997 Algarve Cup
3.	1 October 1997	Oslo, Norway	Netherlands	6–1	6–1	1999 FIFA Women's World Cup qualification
4.	19 March 1998	Lagos, Portugal	United States	4–0	4–1	1998 Algarve Cup
5.	21 March 1998	Loulé, Portugal	Denmark	2–0	4–1	1998 Algarve Cup
6.	27 July 1998	Uniondale, United States	Denmark	1–0	1–1 (4–2 p)	1998 Goodwill Games
7.	24 September 1998	Oslo, Norway	France	4–0	6–0	Friendly
8.	24 September 1998	Oslo, Norway	France	5–0	6–0	Friendly
9.	10 October 1998	Gothenburg, Sweden	Sweden	2–0	2–0	Friendly
10.	23 June 1999	Landover, United States	Canada	3–1	7–1	1999 FIFA Women's World Cup
11.	11 September 1999	Strusshamn, Norway	Switzerland	4–0	4–0	UEFA Women's Euro 2001 qualifying
12.	13 May 2001	Sandnes, Norway	Sweden	3–0	3–1	Friendly
13.	13 October 2001	Cannes, France	France	1–0	3–0	2003 FIFA Women's World Cup qualification
14.	13 October 2001	Cannes, France	France	2–0	3–0	2003 FIFA Women's World Cup qualification
15.	23 January 2002	Guangzhou, China	United States	1–0	1–0	2002 Four Nations Tournament
16.	24 March 2002	Slaný, Czech Republic	Czech Republic	3–1	5–1	2003 FIFA Women's World Cup qualification
17.	29 January 2003	Shanghai, China	China	1–1	1–1	2002 Four Nations Tournament
18.	11 May 2003	Kristiansand, Norway	Belgium	2–0	6–0	UEFA Women's Euro 2005 qualifying
19.	14 March 2004	Guia, Portugal	Finland	1–0	4–1	2004 Algarve Cup
20.	22 May 2004	Wezep, Netherlands	Netherlands	2–0	2–0	UEFA Women's Euro 2005 qualifying
21.	25 March 2006	Athens, Greece	Greece	2–0	3–0	2007 FIFA Women's World Cup qualification
22.	10 May 2006	Sandefjord, Norway	Serbia and Montenegro	1–0	3–0	2007 FIFA Women's World Cup qualification
23.	27 August 2006	Lviv, Ukraine	Ukraine	1–1	1–1	2007 FIFA Women's World Cup qualification

== See also ==
- List of women's footballers with 100 or more international caps
