= 2000 Algarve Cup =

International women's football tournament

Tournament details
- Host country: Portugal
- Dates: 12–18 March 2000
- Teams: 8 (from 3 confederations)

Final positions
- Champions: United States (1st title)
- Runners-up: Norway
- Third place: China

Tournament statistics
- Matches played: 16
- Goals scored: 50 (3.13 per match)
- Top scorer(s): (Norway) Dagny Mellgren (4 goals)

The 2000 Algarve Cup was the seventh edition of the Algarve Cup, an invitational women's association football tournament. It took place between 12 and 18 March 2000 in Portugal with United States winning the event defeating Norway, 1-0, in the final-game. China ended up third defeating Sweden, 1-0, in the third prize game.

== Format ==
The eight participating teams are Canada, China, Denmark, Finland, Norway, Portugal, Sweden and the United States.

The eight teams were split into two groups that played a round-robin group stage. On completion of this, the fourth placed teams from each group would playoff to determine seventh and eighth place, the third placed teams from each group would play each other to decide fifth and sixth place, the second placed teams in each group would play to determine third and fourth place and the winners of the groups would compete for first and second place.

Points awarded in the group stage are three points for a win, one point for a draw and none for a loss.

== Group A ==
Team	Pts	Pld	W	D	L	GF	GA	GD
United States	9	3	3	0	0	10	1	+9
Sweden	6	3	2	0	1	6	2	+4
Denmark	3	3	1	0	2	3	3	0
Portugal	0	3	0	0	3	1	14	−13

March 12, 2000

United States	7–0	Portugal
5' 11' 63' Cindy Parlow; 6' Shannon MacMillan; 22' Joy Fawcett; 67' Tisha Venturini; 88' Julie Foudy	Report; Report

Albufeira

March 12, 2000

Sweden	1–0	Denmark
Elin Flyborg	SvFF Report (in Swedish)

Silves

March 14, 2000

United States	2–1	Denmark
67' Lorrie Fair; 86' MacMillan	Report	10' Gitte Krogh

Faro

March 14, 2000

Sweden	5–1	Portugal
Kristin Bengtsson; Tina Nordlund; Sundh	Report; SvFF Report (in Swedish)	31' Paula Reis

Faro

March 16, 2000

United States	1–0	Sweden
65' Mia Hamm	Report; SvFF Report (in Swedish)

Lagos

March 16, 2000

Denmark	2–0	Portugal
Merete Pedersen; Gitte Krogh	Report

Lagos

== Group B ==
Team	Pts	Pld	W	D	L	GF	GA	GD
Norway	9	3	3	0	0	7	1	+6
China	6	3	2	0	1	8	4	+4
Canada	3	3	1	0	2	3	7	−4
Finland	0	3	0	0	3	2	8	−6

March 12, 2000

China	4–0	Canada
12' 52' Sun Wen; 19' Jin Yan; 35' Zhang Ouying	Report

Lagoa

March 12, 2000

Norway	2–0	Finland
38' Marianne Pettersen; 57' Dagny Mellgren	Report

Lagoa

March 14, 2000

China	4–1	Finland
Jin Yan; Zhang Ouying; Zhao Lihong; Liu Ying		Christina Forssell

Albufeira

March 14, 2000

Norway	2–1	Canada
14' Marianne Pettersen; 45' Linda Ørmen	Report	8' Christine Sinclair

Albufeira

March 16, 2000

China	0–3	Norway
	Report	7' 28' 63' Dagny Mellgren

Portimão

March 16, 2000

Finland	1–2	Canada
24' Satu Kinnas	Report	32' Isabelle Harvey; 89' Amy Walsh

Portimão

== Seventh place ==
March 18, 2000

Finland	3–0	Portugal
Heidi Kackur; Christina Forssell; Laura Kalmari	Report

Montechoro

== Fifth place ==
March 18, 2000

Canada	3–2	Denmark
4' 57' Christine Sinclair; 29' Breanna Boyd	Report	10' Merete Pedersen; 58' Lene Jensen

Lagoa

== Third place ==
March 18, 2000

China	1–0	Sweden
Sun Wen	SvFF Report (in Swedish)

Quarteira

== Final ==
March 18, 2000

United States	1–0	Norway
9' (penalty) Brandi Chastain	Report

Loulé

== Final standings ==
Rank	Team
1st place, gold medalist(s)	United States
2nd place, silver medalist(s)	Norway
3rd place, bronze medalist(s)	China
4	Sweden
5	Canada
6	Denmark
7	Finland
8	Portugal

== Goal scorers ==
Goals	Player
4	(Norway) Dagny Mellgren
3	(Canada) Christine Sinclair
3	(China) Sun Wen
3	(United States) Cindy Parlow
2	(China) Jin Yan
2	(China) Zhang Ouying
2	(Denmark) Gitte Krogh
2	(Denmark) Merete Pedersen
2	(Finland) Christina Forssell
2	(Norway) Marianne Pettersen
2	(Sweden) Tina Nordlund
2	(Sweden) Kristin Bengtsson
2	(United States) Shannon MacMillan
1	20 athletes
0 own goal

2000 Algarve Cup

United States
First title
