= 1999 Algarve Cup =

International women's football tournament

Tournament details
- Host country: Portugal
- Teams: 8 (from 3 confederations)

Final positions
- Champions: China (1st title)
- Runners-up: United States
- Third place: Norway

Tournament statistics
- Matches played: 16
- Goals scored: 40 (2.5 per match)
- Top scorer(s): (United States) Tiffeny Milbrett

The 1999 Algarve Cup was the sixth edition of the Algarve Cup, an invitational women's association football tournament. It took place between 14 and 20 March 1999 in Portugal with China winning the event defeating the US, 2-1, in the final game. The Chinese triumph also became China's first victory against the USA since 1993.

== Format ==
The host and the seven teams invited are Australia, China, Denmark, Finland, Norway, Portugal, Sweden and the United States.

The eight teams were split into two groups that played a round-robin group stage. On completion of this, the fourth placed teams from each group would playoff to determine seventh and eighth place, the third placed teams from each group would play each other to decide fifth and sixth place, the second placed teams in each group would play to determine third and fourth place and the winners of the groups would compete for first and second place.

Points awarded in the group stage are three points for a win, one point for a draw and none for a loss.

== Group A ==
Team	Pts	Pld	W	D	L	GF	GA	GD
United States	7	3	2	1	0	7	2	+5
Norway	6	3	2	0	1	4	3	+1
Sweden	2	3	0	2	1	2	3	−1
Finland	1	3	0	1	2	0	5	−5

14 March 1999

United States	1–1	Sweden
Tiffeny Milbrett 15'	Report; SvFF Report (in Swedish)	Linda Fagerström 76'

Silves
14 March 1999

Norway	1–0	Finland
Marianne Pettersen

Silves

16 March 1999

Norway	2–1	Sweden
Linda Medalen; Anita Rapp	SvFF Report (in Swedish)	Malin Andersson

Quarteira
16 March 1999

United States	4–0	Finland
Tiffeny Milbrett 15', 33'; Cindy Parlow 28'; Brandi Chastain 71'	Report

Quarteira

18 March 1999

United States	2–1	Norway
Julie Foudy 12'; Kristine Lilly 55'	Report	Ann Kristin Aarønes 11'

Albufeira
18 March 1999

Sweden	0–0	Finland
	SvFF Report (in Swedish)

Albufeira

== Group B ==
Team	Pts	Pld	W	D	L	GF	GA	GD
China	9	3	3	0	0	8	0	+8
Denmark	4	3	1	1	1	6	3	+3
Australia	2	3	0	2	1	1	3	−2
Portugal	1	3	0	1	2	0	9	−9

14 March 1999

Denmark	1–1	Australia
Louise Hansen		Julie Murray

Faro
14 March 1999

China	4–0	Portugal
2' 12' Sun Wen; 20' Liu Ying; 34' Pu Wei	Report

Faro

16 March 1999

China	2–0	Denmark
Pu Wei (own goal)

Olhão
16 March 1999

Portugal	0–0	Australia
	Report

Olhão

18 March 1999

Denmark	5–0	Portugal
38' (own goal); 44' Merete Pedersen; 45' Janne Rasmussen; 66' Jeanne Axelsen; 77' Mette Jokumsen	Report

Montechoro
18 March 1999

Australia	0–2	China
		Sun Wen; Liu Ying

Montechoro

== Seventh place ==
20 March 1999

Portugal	2–1	Finland
9' Carla Couto; 36' Adilia Martins	Report	70' Julia Uusmalmi

Montechoro

Portugal finished bottom of their group for the sixth year in a row but won the seventh place playoff with a 2–1 win against Finland.

== Fifth place ==
20 March 1999

Australia	1–1 (7–6) (PSO)	Sweden
Murray	SvFF Report (in Swedish)	Gustafsson

Loulé

== Third place ==
20 March 1999

Norway	2–2 (4–1) (PSO)	Denmark
Selvmal 69' (own goal); 82' Bendiiksen	report (nor.) report (den.)	65' Rasmussen; 90' Pedersen

Loulé

== Final ==
20 March 1999

China	2–1	United States
16' Pu Wei; 65' Yan	Report	45' Tiffeny Milbrett

Loulé

== Final standings ==
Rank	Team
1st place, gold medalist(s)	China
2nd place, silver medalist(s)	United States
3rd place, bronze medalist(s)	Norway
4	Denmark
5	Australia
6	Sweden
7	Portugal
8	Finland

== Goal scorers ==
Goals	Player
4	(United States) Tiffeny Milbrett
3	(China) Jin Yan
2	(Australia) Julie Murray
2	(China) Pu Wei
2	(China) Sun Wen
2	(China) Liu Ying
2	(Denmark) Jeanee Axelsen
2	(Denmark) Mette Jokumsen
2	(Norway) Cecilie Bendiksen
1	15 athletes
1 own goal

1999 Algarve Cup

China
First title
