= Tone Gunn Frustøl =

Norwegian footballer (born 1975)

Personal information
- Full name: Tone Gunn Frustøl
- Date of birth: 21 June 1975 (age 51)
- Place of birth: Asker, Norway
- Height: 5 ft 6 in (1.68 m)
- Positions: Defender; midfielder

Senior career*
Years	Team	Apps	(Gls)
- FK Donn
1996–1999	Asker		
2001–2004	Asker		
2006	Amazon Grimstad	4	(0)

International career^{‡}
1994–1999	Norway	32	(1)
Medal record
Women's football
Representing Norway
Olympic Games
Bronze medal – third place	1996 Atlanta	Team
World Cup
Gold medal – first place	1995 Sweden	Team
- * Club domestic league appearances and goals as of 14:16, 21 September 2014 (UTC) ‡ National team caps and goals as of 14:16, 21 September 2014 (UTC)

Tone Gunn Frustøl (born 21 June 1975) is a former Norwegian footballer, world champion and Olympic medalist.

She debuted for the Norwegian national team in 1994, and played 32 matches for the national team.

She received a bronze medal at the 1996 Summer Olympics in Atlanta.

Frustøl sat out the 2000 season, but returned to Asker for 2001 after God told her to. She later signed for Amazon Grimstad in 2006 but was one of four players to be summarily dismissed in mid season, due to a sudden cash crisis.

== International goals ==
Scores and results list Norway's goal tally first.

#	Date	Venue	Opponent	Result	Competition	Scored
1	12 March 1997	Olhão	Iceland	6–0	1997 Algarve Cup	1
