= Algarve Cup =

Women's association football tournament in Portugal

- Founded: 1994
- Abolished: 2023
- Region: Portugal
- Teams: 5
- Last champions: Sweden (5th title)
- Most championships: United States (10 titles)
- Website: Official website

The Algarve Cup was an invitational tournament for national teams in women's association football hosted by the Portuguese Football Federation (FPF). Held annually in the Algarve region of Portugal from 1994 to 2022, it was one of the most prestigious and longest-running women's international football events and had been nicknamed the "Mini FIFA Women's World Cup".

The most successful teams were the United States, with ten titles, Norway and Sweden with five, and Germany with four. The United States, Norway, Germany, and Spain are the only nations to have won both the FIFA Women's World Cup and the Algarve Cup.

The Algarve Cup, as an annual event featuring most of the world's top women's football teams, had no parallel in the men's game, given that there are fewer professional women's leagues and thus fewer scheduling conflicts. It was played in late February or early March, at the same time as the Arnold Clark Cup, the Cup of Nations, the Cyprus Women's Cup, the Istria Cup, the Pinatar Cup, the SheBelieves Cup, the Tournoi de France, the Turkish Women's Cup and the Women's Revelations Cup.

It has not been held since the introduction of the UEFA Women's Nations League in 2023.

== Format ==
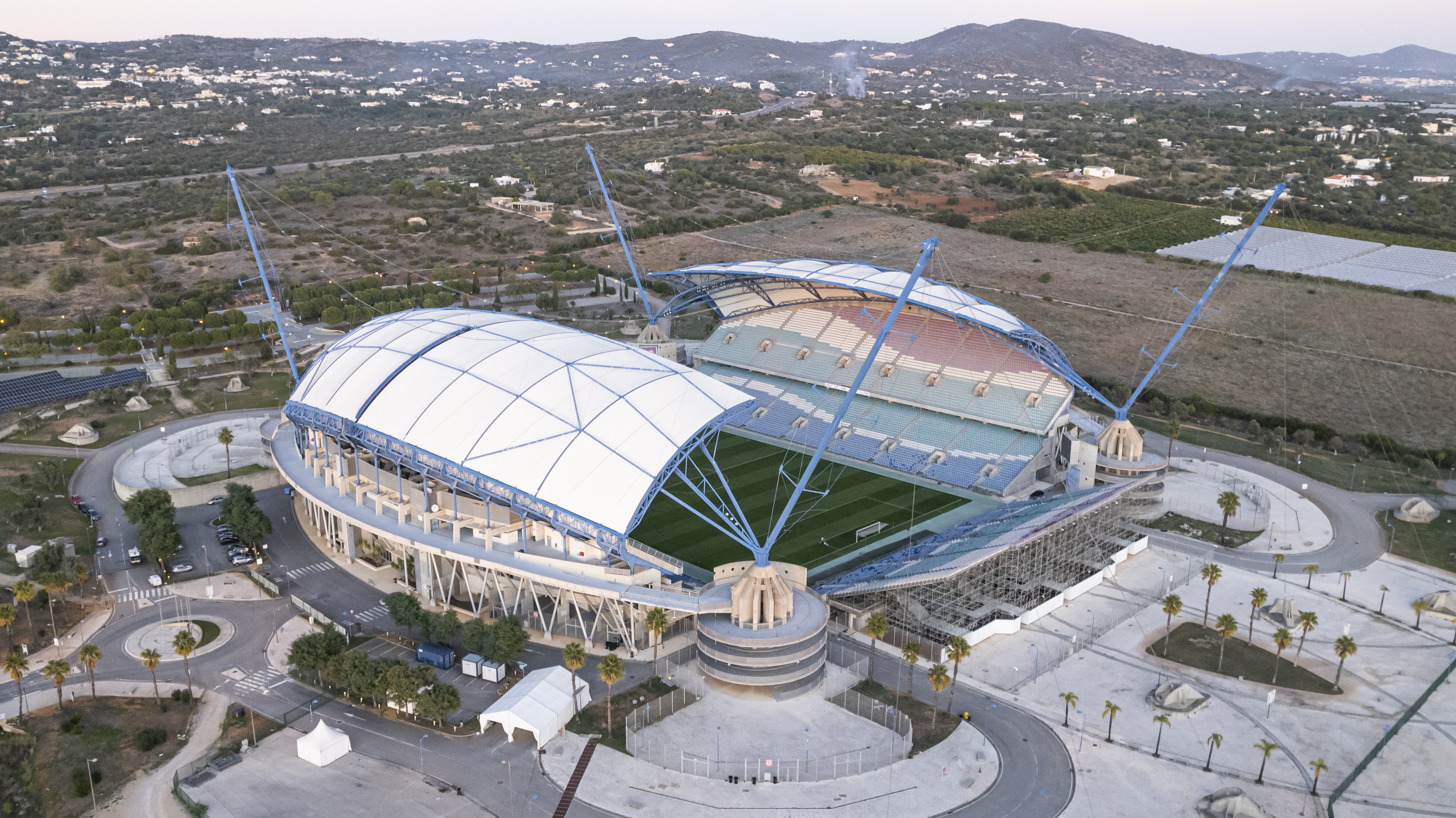
Estádio Algarve, one of the stadiums used in the tournament

From 2002 to 2014, 12 teams were invited, with the top eight competing for the championship. The teams were divided into three groups of four — A, B and C. Group C was added in 2002 to provide second-tier teams with high-level match experience every year. The teams first played round-robin within their pool. Then the placement round proceeded as follows:

- 11th place: The two bottom teams in Group C played one game.
- 9th place: The Group C runner-up played one game against the lower-ranked of the fourth-place teams from Groups A and B.
- 7th place: The Group C winner played one game against the higher-ranked of the fourth-place teams from Groups A and B.
- 5th place: The third-place teams from Groups A and B played one game.
- 3rd place: The second-place teams from Groups A and B played one game.
- 1st place: The first-place teams from Groups A and B played one game.

In 2015, Group C teams became eligible for the final, which was played between the two best group winners. If teams were tied on points, finishing positions were determined by the following tie-breaking criteria in the following order:

1. number of points obtained in the matches among the teams in question
2. goal difference in all the group matches
3. number of goals scored in all the group matches
4. fair-play ranking in all the group matches
5. FIFA ranking

The placement round then became as follows:

- 11th place match: 3rd best 4th placed team vs. 2nd best 4th placed team
- 9th place match: best 4th placed team vs. 3rd best 3rd placed team
- 7th place match: 2nd best 3rd placed team vs. best 3rd placed team
- 5th place match: 3rd best 2nd placed team vs. 2nd best 2nd placed team
- 3rd place match: 3rd best group winner vs. best 2nd placed team
- Final: Best group winner vs. 2nd best group winner

== Results ==
Edition	Year	Final			Third Place Match			Number of teams
Edition	Year	Winners	Score	Runners-up	Third Place	Score	Fourth Place	Number of teams
1	1994	Norway	1–0	United States	Sweden	1–0	Denmark	6
2	1995	Sweden	3–2 (a.e.t.)	Denmark	Norway	3–3 (a.e.t.) (4–2 p)	United States	8
3	1996	Norway	4–0	Sweden	China	2–1	Denmark	8
4	1997	Norway	1–0	China	Sweden	0–0 (6–5 p)	Denmark	8
5	1998	Norway	4–1	Denmark	United States	3–1	Sweden	8
6	1999	China	2–1	United States	Norway	2–2 (a.e.t.) (4–1 p)	Denmark	8
7	2000	United States	1–0	Norway	China	1–0	Sweden	8
8	2001	Sweden	3–0	Denmark	China	5–1	Canada	8
9	2002	China	1–0	Norway	Sweden	2–1	Germany	12
10	2003	United States	2–0	China	Norway	1–0	France	12
11	2004	United States	4–1	Norway	France	3–3 (4–3 p)	Italy	12
12	2005	United States	1–0	Germany	France	3–2	Sweden	12
13	2006	Germany	0–0 (a.e.t.) (4–3 p)	United States	Sweden	1–0	France	11
14	2007	United States	2–0	Denmark	Sweden	3–1	France	12
15	2008	United States	2–1	Denmark	Norway	2–0	Germany	12
16	2009	Sweden	1–1 (4–3 p)	United States	Denmark	1–0	Germany	12
17	2010	United States	3–2	Germany	Sweden	2–0	China	12
18	2011	United States	4–2	Iceland	Japan	2–1	Sweden	12
19	2012	Germany	4–3	Japan	United States	4–0	Sweden	12
20	2013	United States	2–0	Germany	Norway	2–2 (a.e.t.) (3–2 p)	Sweden	12
21	2014	Germany	3–0	Japan	Iceland	2–1	Sweden	12
22	2015	United States	2–0	France	Germany	2–1	Sweden	12
23	2016	Canada	2–1	Brazil	Iceland	1–1 (6–5 p)	New Zealand	8
24	2017	Spain	1–0	Canada	Denmark	1–1 (4–1 p)	Australia	12
25	2018	Netherlands and Sweden; The final was cancelled due to heavy rain			Portugal	2–1	Australia	12
26	2019	Norway	3–0	Poland	Canada	0–0 (6–5 p)	Sweden	12
27	2020	Germany	3–0 (awarded) (Note: The 2020 final was cancelled due to COVID-19 pandemic. Germany were awarded the win by FIFA after Italy withdrew to return home.)	Italy	Norway	2–1	New Zealand	8
	~~2021~~	Cancelled because of the COVID-19 pandemic			Cancelled because of the COVID-19 pandemic			—
28	2022	Sweden	1–1 (6–5 p)	Italy	Norway	2–0	Portugal	5
	~~2023~~	Not held due to Portugal's participation in the 2023 FIFA Women's World Cup qualification play-offs			Not held due to Portugal's participation in the 2023 FIFA Women's World Cup qualification play-offs			—

== Teams reaching the top four ==
Team	Titles	Runners-up	Third place	Fourth place	Top 4
United States	10 (2000, 2003, 2004, 2005, 2007, 2008, 2010, 2011, 2013, 2015)	4 (1994, 1999, 2006, 2009)	2 (1998, 2012)	1 (1995)	17
Norway	5 (1994, 1996, 1997, 1998, 2019)	3 (2000, 2002, 2004)	7 (1995, 1999, 2003, 2008, 2013, 2020, 2022)	–	15
Sweden	5 (1995, 2001, 2009, 2018, 2022)	1 (1996)	6 (1994, 1997, 2002, 2006, 2007, 2010)	9 (1998, 2000, 2005, 2011, 2012, 2013, 2014, 2015, 2019)	21
Germany	4 (2006, 2012, 2014, 2020)	3 (2005, 2010, 2013)	1 (2015)	3 (2002, 2008, 2009)	11
China	2 (1999, 2002)	2 (1997, 2003)	3 (1996, 2000, 2001)	1 (2010)	8
Canada	1 (2016)	1 (2017)	1 (2019)	1 (2001)	4
Spain	1 (2017)	–	–	–	1
Netherlands	1 (2018)	–	–	–	1
Denmark	–	5 (1995, 1998, 2001, 2007, 2008)	2 (2009, 2017)	4 (1994, 1996, 1997, 1999)	11
Japan	–	2 (2012, 2014)	1 (2011)	–	3
Italy	–	2 (2020, 2022)	–	1 (2004)	3
France	–	1 (2015)	2 (2004, 2005)	3 (2003, 2006, 2007)	6
Iceland	–	1 (2011)	2 (2014, 2016)	–	3
Brazil	–	1 (2016)	–	–	1
Poland	–	1 (2019)	–	–	1
Portugal	–	–	1 (2018)	1 (2022)	2
Australia	–	–	–	2 (2017, 2018)	2
New Zealand	–	–	–	2 (2016, 2020)	2

== Medals ==
Rank	Nation	Gold	Silver	Bronze	Total
1	United States (USA)	10	4	2	16
2	Norway (NOR)	5	3	7	15
3	Sweden (SWE)	5	1	6	12
4	Germany (GER)	4	3	1	8
5	China (CHN)	2	2	3	7
6	Canada (CAN)	1	1	1	3
7	Netherlands (NED)	1	0	0	1
7	Spain (ESP)	1	0	0	1
9	Denmark (DEN)	0	5	2	7
10	Japan (JPN)	0	2	1	3
11	Italy (ITA)	0	2	0	2
12	France (FRA)	0	1	2	3
12	Iceland (ISL)	0	1	2	3
14	Brazil (BRA)	0	1	0	1
14	Poland (POL)	0	1	0	1
16	Portugal (POR)	0	0	1	1
Totals (16 entries)		29	27	28	84

- Share gold in 2018 Algarve Cup.

== Participating nations ==
Team	1994	1995	1996	1997	1998	1999	2000	2001	2002	2003	2004	2005	2006	2007	2008	2009	2010	2011	2012	2013	2014	2015	2016	2017	2018	2019	2020	2022	Years
Australia	–	–	–	–	–	5th	–	–	–	–	–	–	–	–	–	–	–	–	–	–	–	–	–	4th	4th	–	–	WD	4
Austria	–	–	–	–	–	–	–	–	–	–	–	–	–	–	–	10th	11th	–	–	–	11th	–	–	–	–	–	–	–	3
Belgium	–	–	–	–	–	–	–	–	–	–	–	–	–	–	–	–	–	–	–	–	–	–	5th	–	–	–	6th	–	2
Brazil	–	–	–	–	–	–	–	–	–	–	–	–	–	–	–	–	–	–	–	–	–	7th	2nd	–	–	–	–	–	2
Canada	–	–	–	–	–	–	5th	4th	8th	7th	–	–	–	–	–	–	–	–	–	–	–	–	1st	2nd	5th	3rd	–	–	8
Chile	–	–	–	–	–	–	–	–	–	–	–	–	–	–	–	–	–	11th	–	–	–	–	–	–	–	–	–	–	1
China	–	–	3rd	2nd	5th	1st	3rd	3rd	1st	2nd	6th	7th	6th	10th	9th	5th	4th	7th	9th	6th	5th	12th	–	10th	11th	12th	–	–	23
Denmark	4th	2nd	4th	4th	2nd	4th	6th	2nd	6th	9th	7th	6th	9th	2nd	2nd	3rd	5th	6th	5th	7th	6th	6th	7th	3rd	10th	6th	5th	5th	28
England	–	–	–	–	–	–	–	–	9th	–	–	8th	–	–	–	–	–	–	–	–	–	–	–	–	–	–	–	–	2
Faroe Islands	–	–	–	–	–	–	–	–	–	–	–	–	–	–	–	–	12th	–	–	–	–	–	–	–	–	–	–	–	1
Finland	6th	5th	8th	6th	8th	8th	7th	7th	7th	6th	9th	10th	7th	6th	8th	7th	8th	10th	–	–	–	–	–	–	–	–	–	–	18
France	–	–	–	–	–	–	–	–	–	4th	3rd	3rd	4th	4th	–	–	–	–	–	–	–	2nd	–	–	–	–	–	–	6
Germany	–	–	–	–	–	–	–	–	4th	–	–	2nd	1st	8th	4th	4th	2nd	–	1st	2nd	1st	3rd	–	–	–	–	1st	–	12
Greece	–	–	–	–	–	–	–	–	–	8th	11th	–	–	–	–	–	–	–	–	–	–	–	–	–	–	–	–	–	2
Hungary	–	–	–	–	–	–	–	–	–	–	–	–	–	–	–	–	–	–	12th	10th	–	–	–	–	–	–	–	–	2
Iceland	–	–	6th	7th	–	–	–	–	–	–	–	–	–	9th	7th	6th	9th	2nd	6th	9th	3rd	10th	3rd	9th	9th	9th	–	–	15
Republic of Ireland	–	–	–	–	–	–	–	–	–	11th	–	–	10th	11th	12th	–	–	–	11th	–	–	–	–	–	–	–	–	–	5
Italy	–	7th	–	–	–	–	–	–	–	–	4th	–	–	7th	6th	–	–	–	–	–	–	–	–	–	–	–	2nd	2nd	6
Japan	–	–	–	–	–	–	–	–	–	–	–	–	–	–	–	–	–	3rd	2nd	5th	2nd	9th	–	6th	6th	–	–	–	7
Mexico	–	–	–	–	–	–	–	–	–	–	–	9th	8th	–	–	–	–	–	–	8th	–	–	–	–	–	–	–	–	3
Netherlands	–	6th	–	5th	6th	–	–	–	–	–	–	–	–	–	–	–	–	–	–	–	–	–	–	5th	1st	11th	–	–	6
New Zealand	–	–	–	–	–	–	–	–	–	–	–	–	–	–	–	–	–	–	–	–	–	–	4th	–	–	–	4th	–	2
North Korea	–	–	–	–	–	–	–	–	–	–	–	–	–	–	–	–	–	–	–	–	8th	–	–	–	–	–	–	–	1
Northern Ireland	–	–	–	–	–	–	–	–	–	–	12th	12th	WD	–	–	–	–	–	–	–	–	–	–	–	–	–	–	–	2
Norway	1st	3rd	1st	1st	1st	3rd	2nd	5th	2nd	3rd	2nd	5th	5th	5th	3rd	9th	6th	5th	7th	3rd	10th	5th	–	11th	7th	1st	3rd	3rd	27
Poland	–	–	–	–	–	–	–	–	–	–	–	–	–	–	11th	11th	–	–	–	–	–	–	–	–	–	2nd	–	–	3
Portugal	5th	8th	7th	8th	7th	7th	8th	8th	11th	10th	8th	11th	11th	12th	10th	8th	10th	9th	10th	11th	12th	11th	8th	12th	3rd	10th	8th	4th	28
Romania	–	–	–	–	–	–	–	–	–	–	–	–	–	–	–	–	7th	12th	–	–	–	–	–	–	–	–	–	–	2
Russia	–	–	5th	–	–	–	–	–	–	–	–	–	–	–	–	–	–	–	–	–	9th	–	6th	8th	12th	–	–	–	5
Scotland	–	–	–	–	–	–	–	–	10th	–	–	–	–	–	–	–	–	–	–	–	–	–	–	–	–	5th	–	–	2
South Korea	–	–	–	–	–	–	–	–	–	–	–	–	–	–	–	–	–	–	–	–	–	–	–	–	7th	–	–	–	1
Spain	–	–	–	–	–	–	–	–	–	–	–	–	–	–	–	–	–	–	–	–	–	–	–	1st	–	7th	–	–	2
Sweden	3rd	1st	2nd	3rd	4th	6th	4th	1st	3rd	5th	5th	4th	3rd	3rd	5th	1st	3rd	4th	4th	4th	4th	4th	–	7th	1st	4th	7th	1st	27
Switzerland	–	–	–	–	–	–	–	–	–	–	–	–	–	–	–	–	–	–	–	–	–	8th	–	–	–	8th	–	–	2
United States	2nd	4th	–	–	3rd	2nd	1st	6th	5th	1st	1st	1st	2nd	1st	1st	2nd	1st	1st	3rd	1st	7th	1st	–	–	–	–	–	–	20
Wales	–	–	–	–	–	–	–	–	12th	12th	10th	–	–	–	–	12th	–	8th	8th	12th	–	–	–	–	–	–	–	–	7
Total (36 teams)	6	8	8	8	8	8	8	8	12	12	12	12	11	12	12	12	12	12	12	12	12	12	8	12	12	12	8	5	

== Statistics ==
=== Teams ===
As of 2022

Rank	Team	Part	M	W	D	L	GF	GA	GD	Points
1	United States	20	79	56	11	12	173	62	+111	179
2	Sweden	27	103	52	23	28	185	108	+78	179
3	Norway	27	103	53	14	36	175	117	+58	173
4	Denmark	28	107	42	14	51	146	151	−5	140
5	China	23	91	35	14	42	106	109	−3	119
6	Portugal	28	106	26	16	63	101	208	−107	97
7	Germany	12	44	29	2	13	94	35	+59	89
8	Iceland	15	59	21	11	27	75	93	−18	74
9	Canada	8	31	17	5	9	51	35	+16	56
10	Japan	7	28	16	1	11	45	36	+9	49
11	Italy	5	22	13	2	7	34	32	+2	41
12	France	6	24	13	2	9	34	35	−1	41
13	Finland	18	71	8	9	54	45	165	−120	33
14	Wales	7	28	9	5	14	31	47	−16	32
15	Netherlands	6	22	9	3	10	26	34	−8	30
16	Republic of Ireland	5	19	4	8	7	18	28	−10	20
17	Mexico	3	11	5	2	4	18	15	+3	17
18	Australia	3	12	4	5	3	15	14	+1	17
19	Russia	5	20	5	2	13	16	41	−25	17
20	Brazil	2	8	5	1	2	15	7	+8	16
21	Spain	2	7	5	1	1	10	4	+6	16
22	Austria	3	12	5	1	6	20	17	+3	16
23	Greece	2	8	4	2	2	9	11	−2	14
24	England	2	8	4	1	3	21	12	+9	13
25	Romania	2	8	4	3	1	13	5	+8	13
26	Scotland	2	7	4	0	3	9	10	−1	12
27	Poland	3	11	3	2	6	12	20	−8	11
28	Belgium	2	7	3	1	3	10	9	+1	10
29	North Korea	1	4	3	0	1	6	4	+2	9
30	Hungary	2	8	2	1	5	7	14	−7	7
31	New Zealand	2	7	1	3	3	4	8	−4	6
32	South Korea	1	3	1	1	1	4	5	−1	4
33	Switzerland	1	4	1	1	2	5	9	−4	4
34	Northern Ireland	2	8	1	0	7	4	19	−15	3
35	Chile	1	4	0	2	2	2	5	−3	2
36	Faroe Islands	1	4	0	0	4	1	19	−18	0

=== Individuals ===
Year	Best Player	Top Scorer	Goals
1994	(Norway) Ann Kristin Aarones	(Norway) Ann Kristin Aarones	5
1995	(Denmark) Helle Jensen	(Denmark) Helle Jensen	6
1996	(Norway) Hege Riise		
1997	(Norway) Marianne Pettersen		
1998	(Norway) Marianne Pettersen		
1999	(United States) Tiffeny Milbrett	(United States) Tiffeny Milbrett	4
2000	(Norway) Dagny Mellgren	(Norway) Dagny Mellgren	4
2001	(Sweden) Hanna Ljungberg	(Sweden) Hanna Ljungberg	6
2002	(China) Bai Jie	(United States) Shannon MacMillan	7
2003	(China) Liu Ying	(Sweden) Hanna Ljungberg	4
2004	(United States) Shannon Boxx	(United States) Abby Wambach	4
2005	(Germany) Birgit Prinz	(United States) Christie Welsh	5
2006	(United States) Shannon Boxx		
2007	(United States) Carli Lloyd	(United States) Carli Lloyd	7
2008	(Denmark) Cathrine Paaske-Sørensen	(Iceland) Margrét Lára Viðarsdóttir	6
2009	(United States) Hope Solo	(Germany) Kerstin Garefrekes (Wales) Jayne Ludlow (Sweden) Lotta Schelin	3
2010	(Germany) Inka Grings	(Germany) Inka Grings	7
2011	(Japan) Homare Sawa	(Iceland) Margrét Lára Viðarsdóttir	4
2012	(Japan) Aya Miyama	(Germany) Célia Okoyino da Mbabi	6
2013	(United States) Megan Rapinoe	(Sweden) Kosovare Asllani (United States) Alex Morgan	3
2014	(Germany) Dzsenifer Marozsán	(Germany) Dzsenifer Marozsán	4
2015	(France) Eugénie Le Sommer	(Sweden) Sofia Jakobsson	4
2016	(Canada) Kadeisha Buchanan	(Belgium) Janice Cayman	4
2017	(Spain) Irene Paredes	(Denmark) Pernille Harder (Japan) Kumi Yokoyama	4
2018	(Portugal) Cláudia Neto	(Netherlands) Lieke Martens (Canada) Christine Sinclair (Sweden) Fridolina Rolfö	3
2019		(Spain) Jennifer Hermoso (Sweden) Mimmi Larsson	3
2020		(Denmark) Nanna Christiansen (Italy) Cristiana Girelli (Denmark) Pernille Harder (Norway) Synne Jensen	2
2022	(Italy) Barbara Bonansea	(Italy) Valentina Giacinti (Norway) Celin Bizet Ildhusøy	2
