= 1998 Four Nations Tournament (women's football) =

Tournament details
- Host country: China
- City: Guangzhou
- Dates: 18–24 January 1998
- Teams: 4 (from 3 confederations)

The 1998 Four Nations Tournament was the first edition of this invitational women's football tournament held in China with four national teams participating in a round robin format. It was held from January 18 to 24, 1998, in the city of Guangzhou.

== Final standings ==
Team	Pld	W	D	L	GF	GA	GD	Pts
United States	3	2	1	0	6	0	+6	7
Norway	3	2	0	1	4	5	−1	6
China	3	1	1	1	5	3	+2	4
Sweden	3	0	0	3	2	9	−7	0

== Match results ==
18 January 1998

United States	3–0	Sweden
Tisha Venturini 34'; Tiffeny Milbrett 63'; Debbie Keller 71'	SvFF Report (in Swedish)

Guangzhou
18 January 1998

Norway	2–1	China
Margunn Haugenes 34'; Marianne Pettersen 77'		Jin Yan 31'

Guangzhou

21 January 1998

Norway	2–1	Sweden
Marianne Pettersen 41'; Hege Riise 44'	SvFF Report (in Swedish)	Allberg 87'

Guangzhou
21 January 1998

United States	0–0	China

Guangzhou

24 January 1998

United States	3–0	Norway
Tisha Venturini 31'; Mia Hamm 53'; Cindy Parlow 75'

Guangzhou
24 January 1998

China	4–1 (Note: SvFF match report lists a 4-0 scoreline.)	Sweden
'Sun Wen 11', 67'; Jin Yan 14'; Liu Ying 67'	SvFF Report (in Swedish)	unknown scorer

Guangzhou
