= 2022 Algarve Cup =

International women's football tournament

Tournament details
- Host country: Portugal
- Dates: 16–23 February
- Teams: 5 (from 1 confederation)
- Venue(s): 2 (in 2 host cities)

Final positions
- Champions: Sweden (5th title)
- Runners-up: Italy
- Third place: Norway
- Fourth place: Portugal

Tournament statistics
- Matches played: 6
- Goals scored: 14 (2.33 per match)
- Top scorer(s): (Italy) Valentina Giacinti (Norway) Celin Bizet Ildhusøy (2 goals each)
- Best player(s): (Italy) Barbara Bonansea

The 2022 Algarve Cup was the 28th edition of the Algarve Cup, an invitational women's football tournament held annually in Portugal. It took place from 16 to 23 February 2022.

== Teams ==
Five teams were participating.

Team	FIFA Rankings (December 2021)
Sweden	2
~~Australia~~	11
Norway	12
Denmark	14
Italy	15
Portugal	29

Note: Australia withdrew before the draw due to serious concerns for the health and wellbeing of players and team officials following a lengthy and crowded 2021 schedule.

== Format ==
Five teams played two matches each to determine the standings. The top two teams played the final, while the other three teams played each other in 45 minutes matches to determine the final ranking.

== Preliminary round ==
=== Standings ===
Pos	Team	Pld	W	D	L	GF	GA	GD	Pts	Qualification
1	Sweden	2	2	0	0	7	0	+7	6	Final
2	Italy	2	2	0	0	3	1	+2	6	Final
3	Portugal	2	1	0	1	2	4	−2	3	Third place match
4	Norway	2	0	0	2	1	4	−3	0	Third place match
5	Denmark (Note: On 17 February, Denmark withdrew following the discovery of four COVID-19 cases within their squad: Sweden were awarded a 3–0 victory for their match against Denmark.)	2	0	0	2	0	4	−4	0	Withdrew

Source: FPF
Rules for classification: 1) Points; 2) Goal difference; 3) Goals scored; 4) Head-to-head points; 5) Head-to-head goal difference.

=== Results ===
All times are local (UTC±0)

16 February 2022
12:00

Denmark	0–1	Italy
	Report	Bonansea 50'

Estádio Municipal de Lagos, Lagos
Referee: Susana Corella (Ecuador)
16 February 2022
18:30

Norway	0–2	Portugal
	Report	Pinto 22'; Mendes 90+4'

Estádio Municipal de Lagos, Lagos
Referee: Maria Rivet (Mauritania)

20 February 2022
11:00

Italy	2–1	Norway
Giacinti 10'; Caruso 28'	Report	Ildhusøy 45+3'

Estádio Algarve, Algarve
Referee: Maria Rivet (Mauritania)
20 February 2022
17:15

Portugal	0–4	Sweden
	Report	Glas 56'; Ilestedt 60'; Asllani 74'; Blackstenius 76'

Estádio Algarve, Algarve
Referee: Kim Yoo-jeong (South Korea)

Sweden	3–0 (awarded)	Denmark

As the withdrawal of Denmark after their second match left four teams in the competition, the remaining five group matches were scratched: Sweden and Italy qualified for the final, while Portugal and Norway qualified for the third place match.

== Third place match ==
Originally, it was planned that the teams finishing third to fifth would play each other in a round-robin of 45-minute matches.

However, following the withdrawal of Denmark, this was scratched and a full-length third place match was played.

23 February 2022
11:00

Portugal	0–2	Norway
	Report	Terland 20'; Ildhusøy 78'

Estádio Algarve, Algarve
Referee: Susana Corella (Ecuador)

== Final ==
23 February 2022
11:00

Sweden	1–1	Italy
Seger 71' (pen.)	Report	Giacinti 18'
Penalties
Seger (penalty scored); Asllani (penalty scored); Blackstenius (penalty scored); Berglund (penalty scored); Angeldal (penalty scored); Lindahl (penalty scored)	6–5	(penalty scored) Giugliano; (penalty scored) Gama; (penalty scored) Girelli; (penalty scored) Cernoia; (penalty scored) Caruso; (penalty missed) Serturini

Estádio Municipal de Lagos, Lagos
Referee: Kim Yoo-jeong (South Korea)

== Final ranking ==
Rank	Team
1st place, gold medalist(s)	Sweden
2nd place, silver medalist(s)	Italy
3rd place, bronze medalist(s)	Norway
4	Portugal
5	Denmark

== Goalscorers ==
There were 14 goals scored in 6 matches, for an average of 2.33 goals per match.

2 goals

- (Italy) Valentina Giacinti
- (Norway) Celin Bizet Ildhusøy

1 goal

- (Italy) Barbara Bonansea
- (Italy) Arianna Caruso
- (Norway) Elisabeth Terland
- (Portugal) Carolina Mendes
- (Portugal) Tatiana Pinto
- (Sweden) Kosovare Asllani
- (Sweden) Stina Blackstenius
- (Sweden) Hanna Glas
- (Sweden) Amanda Ilestedt
- (Sweden) Caroline Seger
