= 2004 Algarve Cup =

International women's football tournament

Tournament details
- Host country: Portugal
- City: Algarve
- Dates: 14–20 March 2004
- Teams: 12 (from 3 confederations)

Final positions
- Champions: United States (3rd title)
- Runners-up: Norway
- Third place: France
- Fourth place: Italy

Tournament statistics
- Matches played: 24
- Goals scored: 69 (2.88 per match)
- Top scorer(s): (United States) Abby Wambach (5 goals)
- Best player(s): (United States) Shannon Boxx
- Best goalkeeper: (Sweden) Sofia Lundgren

The 2004 Algarve Cup was the 11th edition of the Algarve Cup, an invitational women's football tournament held annually in Portugal. It took place 14–20 March 2004. The USA won the tournament defeating Norway, 4-1, in the final game.

== Format ==
The twelve invited teams are split into three groups that played a round-robin tournament.

Since the expansion to 12 teams in 2002, the Algarve Cup format has been as follows: Groups A and B, containing the strongest ranked teams, are the only ones in contention to win the title. The group A and B winners contest the final – to win the Algarve Cup. The runners-up play for third place, and those that finish third in the groups play for fifth place. The teams in Group C played for places 7–12. The winner of Group C played the team that finished fourth in Group A or B (whichever has the better record) for seventh place. The Group C runner-up played the team who finishes last in Group A or B (with the worse record) for ninth place. The third and fourth-placed teams in Group C played for the eleventh place.

Points awarded in the group stage followed the standard formula of three points for a win, one point for a draw and zero points for a loss. In the case of two teams being tied on the same number of points in a group, their head-to-head result determined the higher place.

== Teams ==
Team	FIFA Rankings (December 2003)
United States	2
Norway	3
Sweden	4
China	5
Denmark	8
France	9
Italy	10
Finland	19
Portugal (hosts)	34
Wales	56
Greece	57
Northern Ireland	77

== Group stage ==
=== Group A ===
Team	Pld	W	D	L	GF	GA	GD	Pts
United States	3	2	0	1	7	4	+3	6
France	3	2	0	1	5	5	0	6
Sweden	3	2	0	1	4	4	0	6
Denmark	3	0	0	3	0	3	−3	0

14 March 2004

Denmark	0–1	Sweden
	SvFF Report (in Swedish)	Olsson 47'

Ferreiras
14 March 2004

United States	5–1	France
Wambach 16'; Hamm 27' (pen.); Hucles 31' 33'; Tarpley 47'	Report	Bompastor 48'

Ferreiras
16 March 2004

Denmark	0–1	United States
	Report	Hucles 61'

Quarteira
16 March 2004

Sweden	0–3	France
	SvFF Report (in Swedish)	Lattaf 18'; Pichon 31'; Bompastor 85'

Quarteira
18 March 2004

Denmark	0–1	France
		Pichon

Silves
18 March 2004

Sweden	3–1	United States
Andersson 33'; Sjöström 49'; Öqvist 55'	Report; SvFF Report (in Swedish)	Reddick

Lagos

=== Group B ===
Team	Pld	W	D	L	GF	GA	GD	Pts
Norway	3	2	1	0	7	1	+6	7
Italy	3	2	0	1	3	4	−1	6
China	3	1	1	1	4	1	+3	4
Finland	3	0	0	3	2	10	−8	0

14 March 2004

Norway	4–1	Finland
Lehn 33'; Riise 41'; 78' (o.g.); Gulbrandsen 87'		Julin

Guia
14 March 2004

Italy	1–0	China
Pasqui

Guia
16 March 2004

Norway	3–0	Italy
Pedersen 46'; Tønnessen 64'; Riise 77'

Olhão
16 March 2004

Finland	0–4	China
		Zhang Ouying; Han Duan

Olhão
18 March 2004

Norway	0–0	China

Silves
18 March 2004

Finland	1–2	Italy
Valkonen		Panico; Pasqui

Lagos

=== Group C ===
Team	Pld	W	D	L	GF	GA	GD	Pts
Portugal	3	2	0	1	7	3	+4	6
Wales	3	2	0	1	6	4	+2	6
Greece	3	2	0	1	3	3	0	6
Northern Ireland	3	0	0	3	1	7	−6	0

14 March 2004

Greece	1–0	Wales
Papadopoulou

Faro
14 March 2004

Portugal	2–0	Northern Ireland
Carla Couto; Mónica Ribeiro

Faro
16 March 2004

Northern Ireland	0–2	Greece
		Agapitou; Tefani

Albufeira
16 March 2004

Portugal	2–3	Wales
Carla Couto		Daley; Foster

Albufeira
18 March 2004

Wales	3–1	Northern Ireland
Foster; H. Jones; Ludlow	Report	Turner

Guia
18 March 2004

Portugal	3–0	Greece
Tânia Pinto

Faro

== Placement play-offs ==
=== Eleventh place match ===
20 March 2004

Greece	2–0	Northern Ireland
Agapitou

Montechoro

=== Ninth place match ===
20 March 2004

Wales	0–4	Finland
		Kalmari; Rantanen; Talonen; Mäkinen

Ferreiras

=== Seventh place match ===
20 March 2004

Portugal	0–1	Denmark
		A.D.E. Nielsen

Loulé

=== Fifth place match ===
20 March 2004

Sweden	1–1	China
Svensson 70'	SvFF Report (in Swedish)	Fan Yunjie 16'
Penalties
	5–4

Olhão

=== Third place match ===
20 March 2004

France	3–3	Italy
Pichon 13'; Coquet 62'; Tonazzi 87'		Panico 20', 43'; Gazzoli 46'
Penalties
	4–3

Faro

=== Final ===
20 March 2004

United States	4–1	Norway
Wambach 30' 39' 51'; Tarpley 42'	Report	Hege Riise 38'

Faro

2004 Algarve Cup

United States
Third title

== Final standings ==
Rank	Team
1st place, gold medalist(s)	United States
2nd place, silver medalist(s)	Norway
3rd place, bronze medalist(s)	France
4	Italy
5	Sweden
6	China
7	Denmark
8	Portugal
9	Finland
10	Wales
11	Greece
12	Northern Ireland
