= Rytmen av ett regn =

Single by Millas Mirakel
- A-side: "Rytmen av ett regn"
- B-side: "Nyfallen gloria"
- Released: 15 April 1987
- Genre: pop
- Label: EMI
- Songwriters: Morgan Hjalmarsson, Camilla Andersson
- Producer: Niklas Strömstedt

Millas Mirakel singles chronology
"Rytmen av ett regn" (1987)	"Snälla flickor kommer till himmelen...vi andra kommer hur långt som helst / Tom ficka" (1989)

"Rytmen av ett regn" is a song written by Morgan Hjalmarsson and Camilla Andersson, and recorded by Millas Mirakel, releasing it as a 1987 single. which peaked at eight position at the Swedish singles chart.

On 11 July 1987, the song topped Sommartoppen. The song also charted at Svensktoppen for 12 weeks between 13 September-29 November 1987, topping the chart for five weeks.

In 2001, the song was recorded by Svänzons, releasing it as a 2001 single., and the band also performed the song at Dansbandskampen 2009.

== Charts ==
Chart (1987)	Peak position
Sweden (Sverigetopplistan)	8
