= 1996 Algarve Cup =

International women's football tournament

Tournament details
- Host country: Portugal
- Teams: 8 (from 2 confederations)
- Venue(s): 8

Final positions
- Champions: Norway (2nd title)
- Runners-up: Sweden
- Third place: China

Tournament statistics
- Matches played: 16
- Goals scored: 52 (3.25 per match)
- Best player(s): (Norway) Hege Riise

The 1996 Algarve Cup was the third edition of the Algarve Cup, an invitational women's association football tournament. It took place between 11 and 17 March 1996 in Portugal with Norway winning the event for the second time in its history, defeating Sweden, 4–0 in the final-game.

== Format ==
China, Iceland and Russia were all invited to appear in the Algarve Cup for the first time replacing Italy, the Netherlands and the United States. China became the first team to compete in the tournament representing the Asian Football Confederation.

The eight invited teams were split into two groups that played a round-robin tournament. On completion of this, the fourth placed teams in each group would play each other to determine seventh and eighth place, the third placed teams in each group would play each other to decide fifth and sixth place, the second placed teams in each group would play to determine third and fourth place and the winners of each group would compete for first and second place overall.

Points awarded in the group stage followed the standard formula of three points for a win, one point for a draw and zero points for a loss.

== Group A ==
Team	Pts	Pld	W	D	L	GF	GA	GD
Norway	9	3	3	0	0	10	1	+9
China	6	3	2	0	1	7	4	+3
Russia	3	3	1	0	2	2	5	−3
Portugal	0	3	0	0	3	1	10	−9

March 11, 1996

Norway	4–1	China
Pettersen 11'; Sandaune 46'; Riise 73'; Aarønes 75'		Fan Yunjie 36'

Silves

March 11, 1996

Russia	2–1	Portugal

Silves

March 13, 1996

Norway	3–0	Portugal
Thun 11'; Riise 75'; Svensson 78'

Vila Real de Santo António

March 13, 1996

China	1–0	Russia

Vila Real de Santo António

March 15, 1996

Norway	3–0	Russia
9' (o.g.); Pettersen 86'; Medalen 89'

Quarteira

March 15, 1996

China	5–0	Portugal

Quarteira

== Group B ==
Team	Pts	Pld	W	D	L	GF	GA	GD
Sweden	9	3	3	0	0	10	1	+9
Denmark	6	3	2	0	1	6	2	+4
Iceland	3	3	1	0	2	3	5	−2
Finland	0	3	0	0	3	1	12	−11

March 11, 1996

Sweden	2–1	Denmark
Sundhage 51'; Swedberg 70'	SvFF Report (in Swedish)	Jensen 75'

Lagos

March 11, 1996

Iceland	3–1	Finland

Lagos

March 13, 1996

Sweden	7–0	Finland
Bengtsson 13'; Pohjanen 54', 67', 74'; Andersson 58', 59', 83'	SvFF Report (in Swedish)

Portimão

March 13, 1996

Denmark	3–0	Iceland

Portimão

March 15, 1996

Sweden	1–0	Iceland
Andersson 83'	SvFF Report (in Swedish)

Olhão

March 15, 1996

Denmark	2–0	Finland

Olhão

== Seventh Place ==
March 17, 1996

Portugal	3–0	Finland
Couto; Xavier; Sequeira

Montechoro, Albufeira

Portugal finished bottom of their group for the third year in a row but defeated Finland 3–0 to finish seventh in the final overall standings.

== Fifth Place ==
March 17, 1996

Russia	1–1 asdet (3–2) (PSO)	Iceland
Bosikova		Ólafsdóttir

Vila Real de Santo António

Russia and Iceland faced each other in the fifth place deciding match and with the score level after normal time and an added period of sudden death extra-time, contested the outcome with a penalty shootout. Russia won this 3–2.

== Third Place ==
March 17, 1996

China	2–1	Denmark
Qingmei; Own goal		Petersen

Algarve

China reached the third place play-off in their first appearance at the Algarve Cup and defeated Denmark to take the bronze medal.

== Final ==
March 17, 1996

Norway	4–0	Sweden
8' 83' Aarønes; 36' 71' Pettersen	SvFF Report (in Swedish)

Quarteira

An all Scandinavian final saw 1995 FIFA Women's World Cup winners Norway beat Sweden 4–0 and become champions for the second time in the competition's history.

== Awards ==
1996 Algarve Cup

Norway
Second title

Best player
(Norway) Hege Riise
