= Camilla Andersson =

Swedish footballer

Personal information
- Date of birth: 3 July 1967 (age 59)
- Position: Midfielder

Senior career*
Years	Team	Apps	(Gls)
1997	Älvsjö AIK		

International career
1985–1997	Sweden	11	(4)
- * Club domestic league appearances and goals

Camilla Andersson (born 3 July 1967) is a Swedish footballer who played as a midfielder for the Sweden women's national football team. She was part of the team at the 1988 FIFA Women's Invitation Tournament and UEFA Women's Euro 1997. On club level she played for Älvsjö AIK in Sweden.
