= 1998 Algarve Cup =

International women's football tournament

Tournament details
- Host country: Portugal
- Teams: 8 (from 3 confederations)
- Venue(s): 9

Final positions
- Champions: Norway (4th title)
- Runners-up: Denmark
- Third place: United States

Tournament statistics
- Matches played: 16
- Goals scored: 47 (2.94 per match)
- Best player(s): (Norway) Marianne Pettersen

The 1998 Algarve Cup was the fifth edition of the Algarve Cup, an invitational women's association football tournament. It took place between 15 and 21 March 1998 in Portugal with Norway winning the event for the fourth time in its history defeating Denmark, 4-1, in the final-game. The United States ended up third defeating Sweden, 3-1, in the third prize game.

== Format ==
The United States returned to the tournament, replacing Iceland.

The eight invited teams were split into two groups that played a round-robin tournament. On completion of this, the fourth placed teams in each group would play each other to determine seventh and eighth place, the third placed teams in each group would play each other to decide fifth and sixth place, the second placed teams in each group would play to determine third and fourth place and the winners of each group would compete for first and second place overall.

Points awarded in the group stage followed the standard formula of three points for a win, one point for a draw and zero points for a loss.

== Group A ==
Team	Pts	Pld	W	D	L	GF	GA	GD
Norway	6	3	2	0	1	5	2	+3
United States	6	3	2	0	1	7	5	+2
China	6	3	2	0	1	3	4	−1
Finland	0	3	0	0	3	0	4	−4

March 15, 1998

Norway	0–1	China

Olhão

March 15, 1998

United States	2–0	Finland
Akers 51'; Chastain 76' (pen.)

Olhão

March 17, 1998

Norway	1–0	Finland
Riise

Loulé

March 17, 1998

United States	4–1	China
Hamm 15', 45', 90'; Lilly 87'

Loulé

March 19, 1998

Norway	4–1	United States
Pettersen 6', 70'; Riise 11'; Lehn 49'		Chastain 76' (pen.)

Lagos

March 19, 1998

China	1–0	Finland

Lagos

== Group B ==
Team	Pts	Pld	W	D	L	GF	GA	GD
Denmark	7	3	2	1	0	8	0	+8
Sweden	7	3	2	1	0	3	0	+3
Netherlands	3	3	1	0	2	2	8	−6
Portugal	0	3	0	0	3	1	6	−5

March 15, 1998

Denmark	0–0	Sweden
	SvFF Report (in Swedish)

Vila Real de Santo António

March 15, 1998

Netherlands	2–1	Portugal

Vila Real de Santo António

March 17, 1998

Sweden	2–0	Portugal
Andersson; Lilja	SvFF Report (in Swedish)

Silves

March 17, 1998

Denmark	6–0	Netherlands
2' 46' Gitte Krogh; 9' 20'Birgit Christensen; 77' Anne Dot Eggers Nielsen; 83' Hanne Nørregaard	report

Silves

March 19, 1998

Denmark	2–0	Portugal
15' Petersen; 60' Lene R. Jensen	report

Montechoro, Albufeira

March 19, 1998

Sweden	1–0	Netherlands
Svensson	SvFF Report (in Swedish)

Montechoro, Albufeira

== Seventh Place ==
March 21, 1998

Portugal	2–2 (4–2) (PSO)	Finland
Patrícia; Carla Couto

Paderne

Portugal finished bottom of their group for the fifth year in a row but won the match to decide seventh place on penalties after a 2–2 draw with Finland.

== Fifth Place ==
March 21, 1998

China	3–2	Netherlands

Lagoa

== Third Place ==
March 21, 1998

United States	3–1	Sweden
39' Foudy; 85' (pen.) Chastain; 87' Lilly	SvFF Report (in Swedish)	29' Ljungberg

Quarteira

== Final ==
March 21, 1998

Norway	4–1	Denmark
44' Haugenes; 64' Lehn; 82' Ørmen; 84' Medalen		87' (pen.)

Loulé

== Awards ==
1998 Algarve Cup

Norway
Fourth title

Best player
(Norway) Marianne Pettersen
