= Liu Ying (footballer) =

Chinese footballer (born 1974)

Medal record

Women's football

Representing China

Olympic Games
Silver medal – second place	1996 Atlanta	Team

Asian Games
Gold medal – first place	1998 Bangkok	Team

Liu Ying (simplified Chinese: 刘英; traditional Chinese: 劉英; pinyin: Liú Yīng; born June 11, 1974) is a Chinese football player who competed in the 1996 and 2000 Summer Olympics.

In 1996 she won the Olympic silver medal with China. Her team finished the group phase in first place ahead of the United States. In the semifinals, China defeated Brazil 3–2. She and her team earned silver after a 2–1 loss to the hosts the United States in the final. She played three matches including the final.

She played in the 1999 FIFA World Cup. She scored a goal in the 3–1 win against Australia in the group stage. The final match against the hosts the United States went to penalties, where her kick was saved by Briana Scurry. The U.S. ultimately won the shootout 5–4. One year later she was a member of the Chinese team which finished fifth in the 2000 Summer Olympics. She played all three matches.
