= Sweden women's national football team =

Sweden
- Nickname(s): Blågult (The Blue-Yellow)
- Association: Svenska Fotbollförbundet (SvFF)
- Confederation: UEFA (Europe)
- Head coach: Tony Gustavsson
- Captain: Kosovare Asllani
- Most caps: Caroline Seger (240)
- Top scorer: Lotta Schelin (88)
- Home stadium: Various
- FIFA code: SWE
First colours	Second colours

FIFA ranking
- Current: 8 (20 October 2026)
- Highest: 1 (August 2023)
- Lowest: 11 (September 2017; June 2018)

First international
- Sweden 0–0 Finland (Mariehamn, Finland; 25 August 1973)

Biggest win
- Sweden 17–0 Azerbaijan (Gothenburg, Sweden; 23 June 2010)

Biggest defeat
- Norway 4–0 Sweden (Hamar, Norway; 21 January 1996) (Note: Sweden have lost 11 matches with a difference of 4 goals. The match displayed here is the first one chronologically. The last one is a 4–0 loss against Spain, on 24 October 2025, as 2025 UEFA Women's Nations League semi-finals first leg.)

World Cup
- Appearances: 9 (first in 1991)
- Best result: Runners-up (2003)

European Championship
- Appearances: 12 (first in 1984)
- Best result: Champions (1984)

Olympic Games
- Appearances: 7 (first in 1996)
- Best result: Silver (2016, 2020)

Nations League Finals
- Appearances: 1 (first in 2025)
- Best result: Fourth place (2025)
Medal record
FIFA Women's World Cup
Silver medal – second place	2003 United States	Team
Bronze medal – third place	1991 China	Team
Bronze medal – third place	2011 Germany	Team
Bronze medal – third place	2019 France	Team
Bronze medal – third place	2023 Australia - New Zealand	Team
UEFA Women's Championship
Gold medal – first place	1984	Team
Silver medal – second place	1987 Norway	Team
Silver medal – second place	1995 Denmark	Team
Silver medal – second place	2001 England	Team
Bronze medal – third place	1989 West Germany	Team
Olympic Games
Silver medal – second place	2016 Rio	Team
Silver medal – second place	2020 Tokyo	Team

The Sweden women's national football team (Swedish: Svenska damfotbollslandslaget), nicknamed Blågult ("The Blue-Yellow"), represents Sweden at international women's association football competitions. It was established in 1973 and is governed by the Swedish Football Association.

The team has represented Sweden at the FIFA Women's World Cup on nine occasions. They were runners-up in 2003 and bronze medalists in 1991, 2011, 2019, and 2023. Sweden have been to seven Olympic Games, winning silver medals in 2016 and 2021. On the continental level, the team has participated in the UEFA Women's Euro eleven times, becoming champions in 1984 and finishing in second place in 1987, 1995 and 2001. They have also competed in the UEFA Women's Nations League since the inaugural 2023–24 season.

== History ==
The 2003 World Cup final was only the second time Sweden ever reached the final of a FIFA World Cup after the 1958 FIFA Men's World Cup Final, and was the second most watched event in Sweden that year.

The team was coached by Thomas Dennerby from 2005 to 2012. After winning the two qualifying matches against Denmark for the Beijing 2008 Olympics, the Swedish Olympic Committee approved of record increases in investments for the women's team. The new budget granted over a million SEK (about US$150,000) for the team and 150,000 SEK (about US$25,000) per player for developing physical fitness. The new grants are almost a 100% increase of the 2005 and 2006 season funds.

The team was coached by Pia Sundhage from 2012 to 2017. The developments and conditions of the Sweden women's national football team from its beginnings until 2013 can be seen in the 2013 three-part Sveriges Television documentary television series The Other Sport. Lotta Schelin surpassed Hanna Ljungberg's 72-goal record against Germany on 29 October 2014.

In November 2016, Peter Gerhardsson was announced as the new manager, and replaced Pia Sundhage after the UEFA Women's Euro 2017.

At the 2023 FIFA Women's World Cup, the Sweden national team won all of their three group stage games against South Africa, Italy, and Argentina. The round of 16 knockout game against the United States finished 0–0 after extra time, with the Swedish team winning 5–4 in the penalty shootout. Sweden then won the quarter-final against Japan with two goals against one. In the semi-final, Spain scored the game-winning goal in the 89th minute and later went on to win the tournament. Sweden won the bronze medal for the fourth time, beating co-hosts Australia 2–0 in the third-place match. Central defender Amanda Ilestedt was named the third-best player of the tournament and received the Bronze Ball. She was also the highest scorer for Sweden with four tournament goals.

== Team image ==
=== Home stadium ===
The national arena for the women's team was Gamla Ullevi in Gothenburg until 2024, when it lost its license. Two of the four home games of the 2023–24 UEFA Women's Nations League, including the promotion/relegation play-off, were played at Stadion in Malmö and Stockholmsarenan in Stockholm. The three largest home attendances for the women's team are at the national arena for the men's team, Nationalarenan in Solna, see Home attendance records below. One of the three home games of the UEFA Women's Euro 2025 qualifying, against the Republic of Ireland, was played at Nationalarenan on 4 June 2024.

=== Home attendance records ===
As of 22 July 2024.

	Date	Opponent	Result F–A	Venue	Attendance	Competition
1	28 June 2022	Brazil	3–1	Strawberry Arena, Solna	33,218	Friendly
2	6 April 2019	Germany	1–2	Strawberry Arena, Solna	25,882	Friendly
3	4 June 2024	Republic of Ireland	1–0	Strawberry Arena, Solna	21,216	UEFA Women's Euro 2025 qualifying
4	8 May 2002	Switzerland	4–0	Råsunda Stadium, Solna	20,302	2003 FIFA Women's World Cup qualification
5	16 July 2024	England	0–0	Gamla Ullevi, Gothenburg	16,789	UEFA Women's Euro 2025 qualifying

== Results and fixtures ==
The following is a list of match results in the last 12 months, as well as any future matches that have been scheduled.

Legend

Win Draw Loss Fixture

=== 2025 ===
28 November 2025 UEFA Women's Nations League 3rd	France	2–1	Sweden	Reims, France
21:10 UTC+1	Karchaoui 45+3' (pen.); Mbock Bathy 90+6'	Report	Blackstenius 67'	Stadium: Stade Auguste-Delaune; Attendance: 7,091; Referee: Désirée Blanco (Switzerland)

2 December 2025 UEFA Women's Nations League 3rd	Sweden	2–2 (a.e.t.) (3–4 agg.)	France	Solna, Sweden
19:00 UTC+1	Ijeh 84'; Kafaji 90+2'	Report	Mateo 58'; Gago 106'	Stadium: Strawberry Arena; Attendance: 9,141; Referee: Marta Huerta De Aza (Spain)

=== 2026 ===
3 March 2027 FIFA Women's World Cup qualification	Italy	0–1	Sweden	Reggio Calabria, Italy
18:15 UTC+1		Report	Angeldahl 22'	Stadium: Stadio Oreste Granillo; Attendance: 6,008; Referee: Olatz Rivera Olmedo (Spain)

7 March 2027 FIFA Women's World Cup qualification	Serbia	0–0	Sweden	Stara Pazova, Serbia
16:00 UTC+1		Report		Stadium: Serbian FA Sports Center; Attendance: 412; Referee: Fabienne Michel (Germany)

14 April 2027 FIFA Women's World Cup qualification	Sweden	1–2	Denmark	Gothenburg, Sweden
19:00 UTC+2	Jusu Bah 8'	Report (FIFA); Report (UEFA)	Harder 30'; Thomsen 90+2'	Stadium: Gamla Ullevi; Attendance: 12,573; Referee: Ivana Martinčić (Croatia)

18 April 2027 FIFA Women's World Cup qualification	Sweden	1–0	Serbia	Solna, Sweden
16:00 UTC+2	Blackstenius 50'	Report (FIFA); Report (UEFA)		Stadium: Nationalarenan; Attendance: 20,097; Referee: Désirée Blanco (Switzerland)

5 June 2027 FIFA Women's World Cup qualification	Denmark	2–1	Sweden	Odense, Denmark
19:15	Fløe 25'; Harder 65'	Report (FIFA); Report (UEFA)	Rytting Kaneryd 52'	Stadium: Odense Stadium; Attendance: 5,902; Referee: Stéphanie Frappart (France)

9 June 2027 FIFA Women's World Cup qualification	Sweden	2–2	Italy	Gothenburg, Sweden
19:00 UTC+2	Lundkvist 70'; Rolfö 73'	Report (FIFA); Report (UEFA)	Oliviero 36'; Piemonte 45'	Stadium: Gamla Ullevi; Attendance: 12,816; Referee: Iuliana Demetrescu (Romania)

9 October 2027 FIFA Women's World Cup play-offs	Lithuania	0–5	Sweden	Kaunas, Lithuania
19:05 (20:05 UTC+3)		Report (FIFA); Report (UEFA)	Schröder 23' (pen.), 57', 62'; Blackstenius 75'; Ilestedt 82'	Stadium: Darius and Girėnas Stadium; Attendance: 2,022; Referee: Deborah Anex (Switzerland)

13 October 2027 FIFA Women's World Cup play-offs	Sweden	10–0	Lithuania	Solna, Sweden
19:00 UTC+2	Björn 11'; Blackstenius 16', 52'; Holmberg 25'; Lundkvist 30'; Schröder 36', 45+1'; Ilestedt 60', 81'; Šeškutė 69' (o.g.)	Report (FIFA); Report (UEFA)		Stadium: Nationalarenan; Attendance: 10,309; Referee: Lotta Vuorio (Finland)

1 December 2027 FIFA Women's World Cup play-offs	Scotland	v	Sweden	Paisley, Scotland
				Stadium: St Mirren Park

5 December 2027 FIFA Women's World Cup play-offs	Sweden	v	Scotland	Stockholm, Sweden
16:00 UTC+1				Stadium: 3Arena

== Coaching staff ==
=== Current coaching staff ===
As of 1 August 2025

Position	Name	Ref.
Head coach	(Sweden) Tony Gustavsson	
Assistant coach	(Sweden) Johanna Almgren	

=== Manager history ===
Name	P	W	D	L	GF	GA	Debut	Last match
(Sweden) Christer Molander	1	0	1	0	0	0	25 August 1973	25 August 1973
(Sweden) Hans Karlsson	12	7	1	4	19	10	26 July 1974	2 October 1976
(Sweden) Tord Grip	7	6	1	0	17	3	18 June 1977	21 October 1978
(Sweden) Ulf Bergquist	7	3	3	1	10	4	5 July 1979	27 July 1979
(Sweden) Ulf Lyfors	51	34	11	6	135	39	28 June 1980	30 September 1987
(Sweden) Gunilla Paijkull	43	30	6	7	100	30	27 April 1988	29 November 1991
(Sweden) Bengt Simonsson	60	37	6	17	153	69	8 March 1992	31 August 1996
(Sweden) Marika Domanski-Lyfors	154	83	31	20	329	158	9 October 1996	16 June 2005
(Sweden) Thomas Dennerby	112	68	17	27	233	112	28 August 2005	15 September 2012
(Sweden) Pia Sundhage	81	43	18	20	156	72	23 October 2012	29 July 2017
(Sweden) Peter Gerhardsson	115	78	17	20	283	77	19 September 2017	31 July 2025
(Sweden) Tony Gustavsson	10	2	3	5	9	13	1 August 2025	–
Total	593	354	105	136	1,300	538		

Statistics as of 10 June 2026.

== Players ==
=== Current squad ===
23 players were called up for the 2027 FIFA Women's World Cup qualification play-off matches against Lithuania on 9 and 13 October 2026. On 5 October, Elma Junttila Nelhage withdrew and was replaced by Sofia Reidy.

Caps and goals correct as of 13 October 2026, after the match against Lithuania.

No.	Pos.	Player	Date of birth (age)	Caps	Goals	Club
1	GK	Zećira Mušović	26 May 1996 (age 30)	28	0	(Swedish Football Association) Malmö FF
12	GK	Jennifer Falk	26 April 1993 (age 33)	46	0	(Swedish Football Association) BK Häcken
21	GK	Moa Edrud	14 May 2000 (age 26)	0	0	(Swedish Football Association) FC Rosengård
2	DF	Smilla Holmberg	11 October 2006 (age 20)	17	2	(The Football Association) Arsenal
3	DF	Amanda Nildén	7 August 1998 (age 28)	19	0	(The Football Association) Tottenham Hotspur
5	DF	Anna Sandberg	23 May 2003 (age 23)	14	0	(The Football Association) Manchester United
13	DF	Amanda Ilestedt	17 January 1993 (age 33)	84	15	(German Football Association) Eintracht Frankfurt
14	DF	Nathalie Björn	4 May 1997 (age 29)	84	7	(The Football Association) Chelsea
18	DF	Bella Andersson	12 July 2006 (age 20)	8	0	(Royal Spanish Football Federation) Real Madrid
22	DF	Sofia Reidy	15 March 2004 (age 22)	1	0	(Swedish Football Association) Hammarby IF
23	DF	Alice Bergström	3 February 2003 (age 23)	0	0	(The Football Association) Liverpool
4	DF	Hanna Lundkvist	17 July 2002 (age 24)	35	2	(The Football Association) Manchester United
15	MF	Julia Zigiotti Olme	24 December 1997 (age 28)	60	2	(The Football Association) Manchester United
16	MF	Filippa Angeldahl	14 July 1997 (age 29)	87	24	(Royal Spanish Football Federation) Real Madrid
20	MF	Hanna Bennison	16 October 2002 (age 24)	60	3	(German Football Association) Eintracht Frankfurt
6	FW	Monica Jusu Bah	16 May 2003 (age 23)	12	1	(The Football Association) Manchester United
7	FW	Matilda Vinberg	16 March 2003 (age 23)	16	1	(The Football Association) Tottenham Hotspur
8	FW	Evelyn Ijeh	12 August 2001 (age 25)	10	2	(United States Soccer Federation) North Carolina Courage
9	FW	Beata Olsson	31 January 2001 (age 25)	2	0	(The Football Association) Liverpool
10	FW	Rosa Kafaji	5 July 2003 (age 23)	20	3	(The Football Association) London City Lionesses
11	FW	Stina Blackstenius	5 February 1996 (age 30)	132	48	(The Football Association) Arsenal
17	FW	Felicia Schröder	13 April 2007 (age 19)	13	5	(Royal Spanish Football Federation) Real Madrid
19	FW	Anna Anvegård	10 May 1997 (age 29)	39	11	(Swedish Football Association) BK Häcken

=== Recent call-ups ===
The following players have also been called up to the squad within the past 12 months.

Pos.	Player	Date of birth (age)	Caps	Goals	Club	Latest call-up
GK	Tove Enblom ^{INJ}	20 November 1994 (age 32)	1	0	(Norway) Vålerenga	v. Denmark, 14 April 2026
GK	Moa Öhman	25 June 1998 (age 28)	0	0	(Sweden) Djurgården	v. Serbia, 7 March 2026
DF	Elma Junttila Nelhage	21 May 2003 (age 23)	7	0	(France) OL Lyonnes	v. Lithuania, 9 October 2026
DF	Hanna Wijk	15 December 2003 (age 22)	1	0	(England) Tottenham Hotspur	v. Serbia, 7 March 2026
DF	Linda Sembrant ^{RET}	15 May 1987 (age 39)	160	19	(Sweden) AIK	v. France, 2 December 2025
MF	Fridolina Rolfö	24 November 1993 (age 32)	110	34	(England) Manchester United	v. Denmark, 5 June 2026
FW	Johanna Rytting Kaneryd ^{INJ}	12 February 1997 (age 29)	70	9	(France) OL Lyonnes	v. Denmark, 5 June 2026
FW	Rebecka Blomqvist	24 July 1997 (age 29)	41	9	(Germany) Eintracht Frankfurt	v. Denmark, 5 June 2026
FW	Kosovare Asllani ^{INJ} (captain)	29 July 1989 (age 37)	209	50	(England) London City Lionesses	v. Serbia, 7 March 2026
Notes: ^{INJ} = Withdrew due to injury; ^{MED} = Withdrew due to medical reasons; ^{PRE} = Preliminary squad / standby; ^{RET} = Retired from the national team

=== Previous squads ===
FIFA Women's World Cup

- 1991 FIFA Women's World Cup
- 1995 FIFA Women's World Cup
- 1999 FIFA Women's World Cup
- 2003 FIFA Women's World Cup
- 2007 FIFA Women's World Cup
- 2011 FIFA Women's World Cup
- 2015 FIFA Women's World Cup
- 2019 FIFA Women's World Cup
- 2023 FIFA Women's World Cup

Olympic Games

- 1996 Summer Olympics
- 2000 Summer Olympics
- 2004 Summer Olympics
- 2008 Summer Olympics
- 2012 Summer Olympics
- 2016 Summer Olympics
- 2020 Summer Olympics

UEFA Women's Championship

- 1984 UEFA Women's Championship
- 1987 UEFA Women's Championship
- 1989 UEFA Women's Championship
- UEFA Women's Euro 1995
- UEFA Women's Euro 1997
- UEFA Women's Euro 2001
- UEFA Women's Euro 2005
- UEFA Women's Euro 2009
- UEFA Women's Euro 2013
- UEFA Women's Euro 2017
- UEFA Women's Euro 2022
- UEFA Women's Euro 2025

== Player records ==
As of 13 October 2026

Players in bold are still active with the national team.

=== Most appearances ===
Rank	Player	Career	Caps	Goals
1	Caroline Seger	2005–2023	240	32
2	Therese Sjögran	1997–2015	214	21
3	**Kosovare Asllani**	2008–present	209	50
4	Hedvig Lindahl	2002–2022	189	0
5	Nilla Fischer	2001–2021	188	23
6	Lotta Schelin	2004–2017	185	88
7	**Sofia Jakobsson**	2011–present	167	23
8	Victoria Sandell Svensson	1996–2009	166	68
9	Linda Sembrant	2005–2025	160	19
10	Kristin Bengtsson	1991–2005	157	14

=== Top goalscorers ===
#	Player	Career	Goals	Caps	Avg.
1	Lotta Schelin	2004–2017	88	185	0.48
2	Hanna Ljungberg	1996–2008	72	130	0.55
3	Lena Videkull	1984–1996	71	111	0.64
3	Pia Sundhage	1975–1996	71	146	0.49
5	Victoria Sandell Svensson	1996–2009	68	166	0.41
6	**Kosovare Asllani**	2008–present	50	209	0.24
7	**Stina Blackstenius**	2015–present	48	132	0.36
8	Malin Andersson	1994–2005	39	151	0.26
9	Anneli Andelén	1985–1996	37	88	0.42
10	**Fridolina Rolfö**	2014–present	34	110	0.31

== Competitive record ==
Summary
Competition	Champions	Runners-up	Third place	Fourth place	Semi-finals	Appearances
FIFA Women's World Cup		1 (2003)	4 (1991, 2011, 2019, 2023)			9
Olympic Games		2 (2016, 2020)		1 (2004)		7
UEFA Women's Euro	1 (1984)	3 (1987, 1995, 2001)	1 (1989)		4 (1997, 2005, 2013, 2022)	12
UEFA Women's Nations League				1 (2025)		2
Algarve Cup	5 (1995, 2001, 2009, 2018, 2022)	1 (1996)	6 (1994, 1997, 2002, 2006, 2007, 2010)	9 (1998, 2000, 2005, 2011, 2012, 2013, 2014, 2015, 2019)		27

=== FIFA Women's World Cup ===
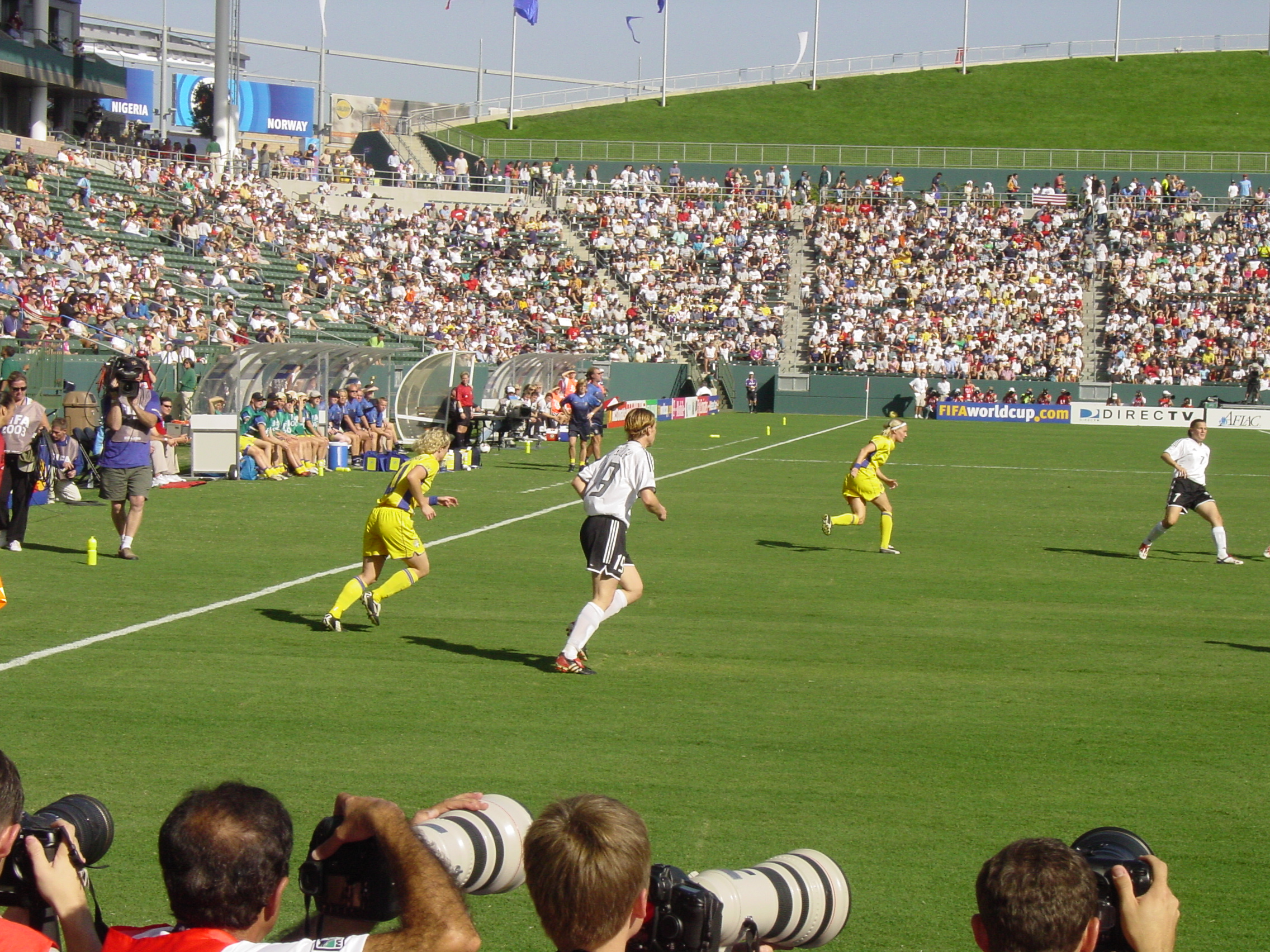
Sweden playing against Germany in the 2003 FIFA Women's World Cup final.

FIFA Women's World Cup record										Qualification record					
Year	Host	Round	Position	Pld	W	D*	L	GF	GA	Pld	W	D	L	GF	GA
1991	China PR	Third place	3rd	6	4	0	2	18	7	6	4	2	0	13	3
1995	Sweden	Quarter-finals	5th	4	2	1	1	6	4	Qualified as hosts					
1999	United States	Quarter-finals	6th	4	2	0	2	7	6	6	6	0	0	18	5
2003	United States	Runners-up	2nd	6	4	0	2	10	7	6	5	0	1	27	4
2007	China PR	Group stage	10th	3	1	1	1	3	4	8	7	1	0	32	6
2011	Germany	Third place	3rd	6	5	0	1	10	6	10	8	2	0	40	6
2015	Canada	Round of 16	16th	4	0	3	1	5	8	10	10	0	0	32	1
2019	France	Third place	3rd	7	5	0	2	12	6	8	7	0	1	22	2
2023	Australia/New Zealand	Third place	3rd	7	5	1	1	14	4	8	7	1	0	32	2
2027	Brazil	to be determined								to be determined					
2031	Costa Rica/Jamaica/Mexico/United States	to be determined								to be determined					
2035	United Kingdom	to be determined								to be determined					
Total		Best: Runners-up	9/10	47	28	6	13	85	52	62	54	6	2	216	29

FIFA Women's World Cup history
Year	Host	Round	Date	Opponent	Result	Stadium
1991	China PR	Group stage	17 November	United States	L 2–3	Ying Dong Stadium, Panyu
1991	China PR	Group stage	19 November	Japan	W 8–0	New Plaza Stadium, Foshan
1991	China PR	Group stage	21 November	Brazil	W 2–0	Ying Dong Stadium, Panyu
1991	China PR	Quarter-finals	24 November	China	W 1–0	Tianhe Stadium, Guangzhou
1991	China PR	Semi-finals	27 November	Norway	L 1–4	Ying Dong Stadium, Panyu
1991	China PR	Third place play-off	29 November	Germany	W 4–0	Guangdong Provincial Stadium, Guangzhou
1995	Sweden	Group stage	5 June	Brazil	L 0–1	Olympia Stadion, Helsingborg
1995	Sweden	Group stage	7 June	Germany	W 3–2	Olympia Stadion, Helsingborg
1995	Sweden	Group stage	9 June	Japan	W 2–0	Arosvallen, Västerås
1995	Sweden	Quarter-finals	13 June	China	D 1–1 (4–3 (p))	Olympia Stadion, Helsingborg
1999	United States	Group stage	19 June	China	L 1–2	Spartan Stadium, San Jose
1999	United States	Group stage	23 June	Australia	W 3–1	Jack Kent Cooke Stadium, Landover
1999	United States	Group stage	26 June	Ghana	W 2–0	Soldier Field, Chicago
1999	United States	Quarter-finals	30 June	Norway	L 1–3	Spartan Stadium, San Jose
2003	United States	Group stage	21 September	United States	L 1–3	RFK Stadium, Washington, D.C.
2003	United States	Group stage	25 September	North Korea	W 1–0	Lincoln Financial Field, Philadelphia
2003	United States	Group stage	28 September	Nigeria	W 3–0	Columbus Crew Stadium, Columbus
2003	United States	Quarter-finals	1 October	Brazil	W 2–1	Gillette Stadium, Foxborough
2003	United States	Semi-finals	5 October	Canada	W 2–1	PGE Park, Portland
2003	United States	Final	12 October	Germany	L 1–2 (a.e.t.)	The Home Depot Center, Carson
2007	China PR	Group stage	11 September	Nigeria	D 1–1	Chengdu Sports Center, Chengdu
2007	China PR	Group stage	14 September	United States	L 0–2	Chengdu Sports Center, Chengdu
2007	China PR	Group stage	18 September	North Korea	W 2–1	Tianjin Olympic Centre Stadium, Tianjin
2011	Germany	Group stage	28 June	Colombia	W 1–0	BayArena, Leverkusen
2011	Germany	Group stage	2 July	North Korea	W 1–0	Impuls Arena, Augsburg
2011	Germany	Group stage	6 July	United States	W 2–1	Volkswagen-Arena, Wolfsburg
2011	Germany	Quarter-finals	10 July	Australia	W 3–1	Impuls Arena, Augsburg
2011	Germany	Semi-finals	13 July	Japan	L 1–3	Commerzbank-Arena, Frankfurt
2011	Germany	Third place play-off	16 July	France	W 2–1	Rhein-Neckar-Arena, Sinsheim
2015	Canada	Group stage	8 June	Nigeria	D 3–3	Winnipeg Stadium, Winnipeg
2015	Canada	Group stage	12 June	United States	D 0–0	Winnipeg Stadium, Winnipeg
2015	Canada	Group stage	16 June	Australia	D 1–1	Commonwealth Stadium, Edmonton
2015	Canada	Round of 16	20 June	Germany	L 1–4	TD Place, Ottawa
2019	France	Group stage	11 June	Chile	W 2–0	Roazhon Park, Rennes
2019	France	Group stage	16 June	Thailand	W 5–1	Allianz Riviera, Nice
2019	France	Group stage	20 June	United States	L 0–2	Stade Océane, Le Havre
2019	France	Round of 16	24 June	Canada	W 1–0	Parc des Princes, Paris
2019	France	Quarter-finals	29 June	Germany	W 2–1	Roazhon Park, Rennes
2019	France	Semi-finals	3 July	Netherlands	L 0–1 (a.e.t.)	Parc Olympique Lyonnais, Décines-Charpieu
2019	France	Third place play-off	6 July	England	W 2–1	Allianz Riviera, Nice
2023	Australia/New Zealand	Group stage	23 July	South Africa	W 2–1	Wellington Regional Stadium, Wellington
2023	Australia/New Zealand	Group stage	29 July	Italy	W 5–0	Wellington Regional Stadium, Wellington
2023	Australia/New Zealand	Group stage	2 August	Argentina	W 2–0	Waikato Stadium, Hamilton
2023	Australia/New Zealand	Round of 16	6 August	United States	D 0–0 (5–4(p))	Melbourne Rectangular Stadium, Melbourne
2023	Australia/New Zealand	Quarter-finals	11 August	Japan	W 2–1	Eden Park, Auckland
2023	Australia/New Zealand	Semi-finals	15 August	Spain	L 1–2	Eden Park, Auckland
2023	Australia/New Zealand	Third place play-off	19 August	Australia	W 2–0	Lang Park, Brisbane

=== Olympic Games ===
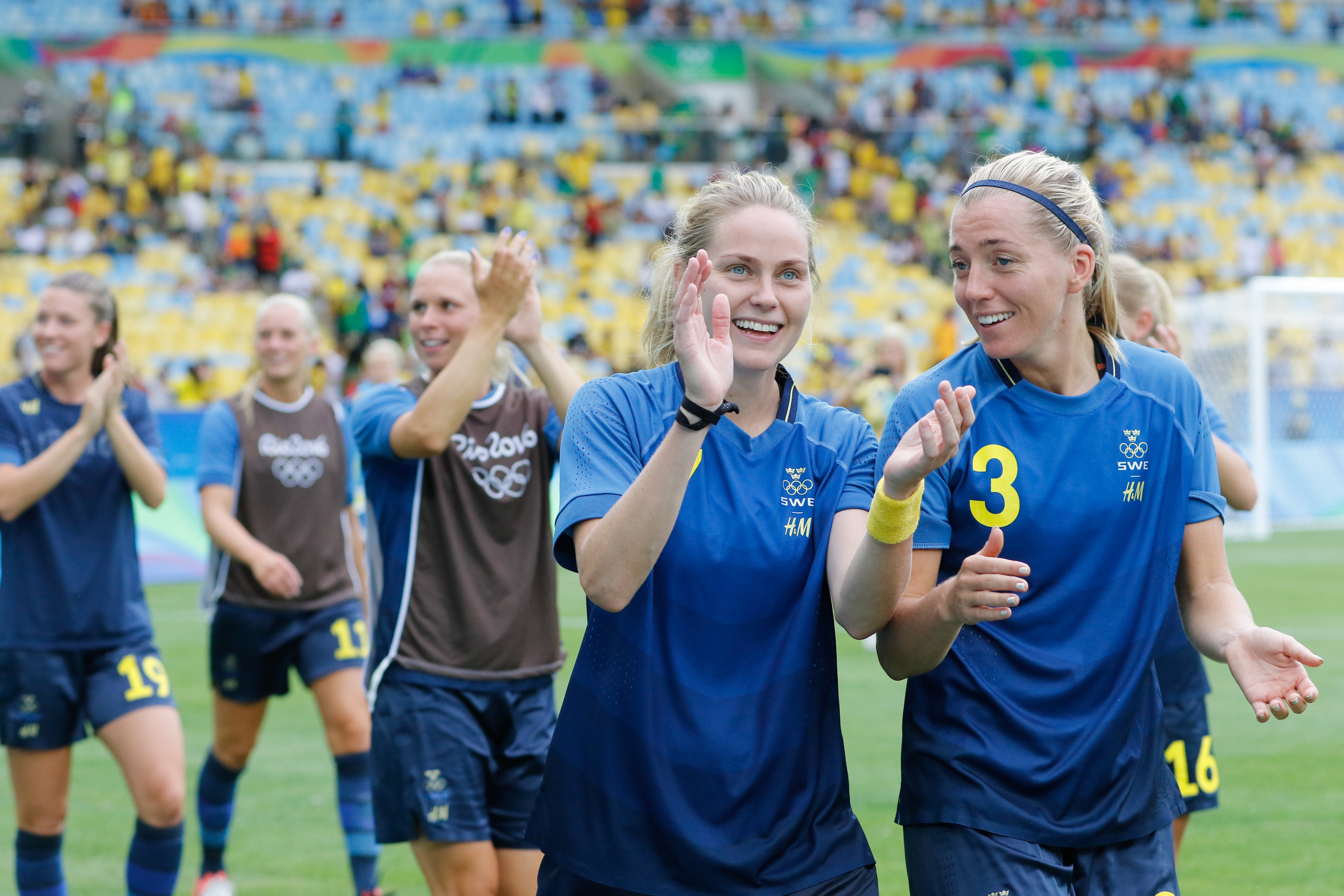
Sweden celebrate after the semi-final victory against Brazil at the 2016 Summer Olympics.

Summer Olympics record										Qualification record					
Year	Host	Round	Position	Pld	W	D *	L	GF	GA	Pld	W	D	L	GF	GA
1996	(United States) Atlanta	Group stage	6th	3	1	0	2	4	5	4	2	1	1	6	4
2000	(Australia) Sydney	Group stage	6th	3	0	1	2	1	4	10	8	2	0	25	11
2004	(Greece) Athens	Fourth place	4th	5	2	0	3	4	5	12	9	0	3	37	11
2008	(China) Beijing	Quarter-final	6th	4	2	0	2	4	5	13	10	2	1	42	13
2012	(United Kingdom) London	Quarter-final	7th	4	1	2	1	7	5	16	13	2	1	50	12
2016	(Brazil) Rio de Janeiro	Silver medalists	2nd	6	1	3	2	4	8	17	12	4	1	40	10
2020	(Japan) Tokyo	Silver medalists	2nd	6	5	1	0	14	4	5	4	0	1	10	4
2024	(France) Paris	Did not qualify								6	2	1	3	8	10
2028	(United States) Los Angeles	To be determined								To be determined					
2032	(Australia) Brisbane	To be determined								To be determined					
Total		Best: Runners-up	7/10	31	12	7	12	38	36	77	58	11	8	210	65

=== UEFA Women's Euro ===
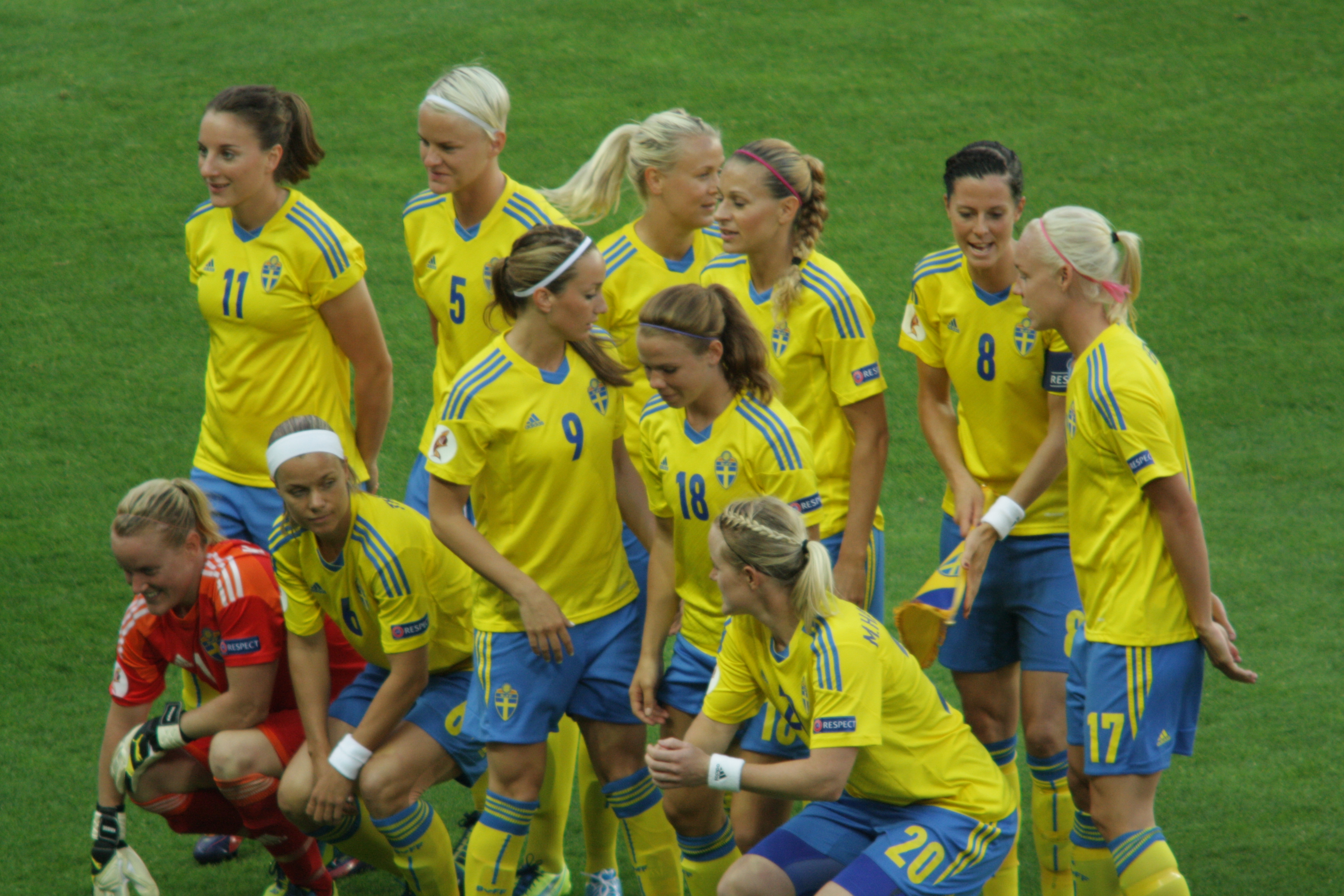
Sweden in the UEFA Women's Euro 2013.

UEFA Women's Euro record										Qualification record							
Year	Host	Round	Position	Pld	W	D *	L	GF	GA	Pld	W	D	L	GF	GA	P/R	Rnk
1984	Multiple	Champions	1st	4	3	0	1	6	4	6	6	0	0	26	1	–	
1987	Norway	Runners-up	2nd	2	1	0	1	4	4	6	5	0	1	14	3	–	
1989	West Germany	Third place	3rd	2	1	0	1	3	3	6	2	3	1	11	4	–	
1991	Denmark	Did not qualify								6	4	2	0	13	3	–	
1993	Italy	Did not qualify								6	3	2	1	18	4	–	
1995	Germany	Runners-up	2nd	3	1	0	2	9	8	6	5	0	1	25	2	–	
1997	Norway; Sweden	Semi-finals	3rd	4	3	0	1	6	2	6	5	1	0	26	2	–	
2001	Germany	Runners-up	2nd	5	3	0	2	7	4	8	5	2	1	28	10	–	
2005	England	Semi-finals	3rd	4	1	2	1	4	4	8	6	1	1	26	5	–	
2009	Finland	Quarter-finals	5th	4	2	1	1	7	4	8	8	0	0	31	0	–	
2013	Sweden	Semi-finals	3rd	5	3	1	1	13	3	Qualified as hosts						–	
2017	Netherlands	Quarter-finals	7th	4	1	1	2	4	5	8	7	0	1	22	3	–	
2022	England	Semi-finals	4th	5	3	1	1	9	6	8	7	1	0	40	2	–	
2025	Switzerland	Quarter-finals	6th	4	3	1	0	10	3	10	6	2	2	26	4	(Note: From Euro 2025 onwards a new qualifying format was introduced, linked to the Women's Nations League where teams are divided into leagues with promotion/relegation between the leagues at the end of each cycle.)	9th
2029	Germany																
Total		Best: Champions	12/14	46	25	7	14	82	50	92	69	14	9	306	43	9th	

=== UEFA Women's Nations League ===
UEFA Women's Nations League record
League phase												Finals							
Season	Lg	Grp	Pos	Pld	W	D	L	GF	GA	P/R	Rnk	Year	Pos	Pld	W	D	L	GF	GA
2023–24	A	4	3rd	8	4	1	3	18	10	*	11th	(Europe) 2024	Did not qualify						
2025	A	4	1st	6	3	3	0	13	6	*	4th	(Europe) 2025	4th	4	0	1	3	3	9
Total				14	7	4	3	31	16	11th and 4th		Total	4th	4	0	1	3	3	9

▲	Promoted at end of season
Same position	No movement at end of season
▼	Relegated at end of season
*	Participated in promotion/relegation play-offs

=== Algarve Cup ===
The Algarve Cup is a global invitational tournament for national teams in women's soccer hosted by the Portuguese Football Federation (FPF) and is held annually in the Algarve region of Portugal since 1994.

Year	Result
1994	Third place
1995	Champions
1996	Runners-up
1997	Third place
1998	Fourth place
1999	Sixth place
2000	Fourth place
2001	Champions
2002	Third place
2003	Fifth place
2004	Fifth place
2005	Fourth place
2006	Third place
2007	Third place
2008	Fifth place
2009	Champions
2010	Third place
2011	Fourth place
2012	Fourth place
2013	Fourth place
2014	Fourth place
2015	Fourth place
2016	Did not enter
2017	Seventh place
2018	Champions
2019	Fourth place
2020	Seventh place
2022	Champions

== Head-to-head record ==
The following table shows Sweden's all-time international record from 1973.

Against	Played	Won	Drawn	Lost	GF	GA	GD
Argentina	2	2	0	0	3	0	+3
Australia	15	9	4	2	28	14	+14
Austria	2	2	0	0	8	1	+7
Azerbaijan	2	2	0	0	20	0	+20
Belarus	2	2	0	0	12	0	+12
Belgium	5	5	0	0	14	3	+11
Bosnia and Herzegovina	4	4	0	0	14	0	+14
Brazil	11	4	2	5	12	15	−3
Canada	24	14	5	5	44	24	+20
Chile	1	1	0	0	2	0	+2
China	27	11	9	7	36	25	+11
Colombia	1	1	0	0	1	0	+1
Croatia	2	2	0	0	6	0	+6
Czech Republic	5	4	1	0	8	2	+6
Czechoslovakia	1	1	0	0	1	0	+1
Denmark	61	35	12	14	102	56	+46
England	30	15	11	4	51	28	+23
Faroe Islands	2	2	0	0	10	0	+10
Finland	39	32	6	1	125	17	+108
France	25	12	4	9	46	32	+14
Georgia	2	2	0	0	19	0	+19
Germany	31	9	2	21	39	54	−15
Ghana	1	1	0	0	2	0	+2
Great Britain	1	0	1	0	0	0	±0
Hungary	8	8	0	0	44	2	+42
Iceland	17	13	2	2	55	11	+44
Iran	1	1	0	0	7	0	+7
Italy	30	19	7	4	54	19	+35
Japan	15	7	3	5	30	15	+15
Latvia	4	4	0	0	25	1	+24
Luxembourg	2	2	0	0	12	0	+12
Malta	1	1	0	0	3	0	+3
Mexico	3	2	1	0	4	1	+3
Moldova	2	2	0	0	9	0	+9
Netherlands	23	10	6	7	33	18	+15
New Zealand	1	1	0	0	2	0	+2
Nigeria	4	2	2	0	9	5	+4
North Korea	4	4	0	0	5	1	+4
Northern Ireland	2	2	0	0	7	0	+7
Norway	56	21	13	22	90	91	−1
Poland	9	9	0	0	34	3	+31
Portugal	12	10	0	2	39	8	+31
Republic of Ireland	10	8	2	0	28	2	+26
Romania	4	4	0	0	22	0	+22
Russia	7	7	0	0	17	1	+16
Scotland	7	7	0	0	19	2	+17
Serbia	3	2	1	0	8	0	+8
Serbia and Montenegro	2	2	0	0	9	1	+8
Slovakia	8	8	0	0	30	1	+29
South Africa	4	3	1	0	9	2	+7
South Korea	4	3	1	0	11	1	+10
Soviet Union	2	2	0	0	6	0	+6
Spain	15	7	4	4	39	21	+18
Switzerland	16	14	0	2	47	9	+38
Thailand	1	1	0	0	5	1	+4
Ukraine	4	3	0	1	11	3	+8
United States	44	8	13	23	44	73	−29
Wales	5	3	2	0	14	3	+11
Total	600	358	108	134	1320	545	775

== Honours ==
=== Major competitions ===
- Olympic Games

Silver medalist: 2016, 2020

- FIFA Women's World Cup

Runner-up: 2003
Third place: 1991, 2011, 2019, 2023

- UEFA Women's Euro

Champion: 1984
Runner-up: 1987, 1995, 2001
Third place: 1989 (not determined after 1993)

=== Regional ===
- Nordic Championship

Champion: 1977, 1978, 1979, 1980, 1981
Runner-up: 1974, 1975, 1976, 1982

=== Friendly ===
- Algarve Cup

Champion: 1995, 2001, 2009, 2018, 2022
Runner-up: 1996
Third place: 1994, 1997, 2002, 2006, 2007, 2010

- Cyprus Tournament

Champion: 1990, 1992

- North America Cup

Champion: 1987

- Australia Cup

Champion: 2003

- Malta Women's Tournament

Champion: 2021

== See also ==
- Sport in Sweden
  - Football in Sweden
    - Women's football in Sweden
- Sweden women's national football team
  - Sweden women's national football team results
  - List of Sweden women's international footballers
- Sweden women's national under-19 football team
- Sweden women's national under-17 football team
- Sweden women's national futsal team

== Notes ==
Sporting positions
Preceded by Inaugural Champions	European Champions; 1984 (First title)	Succeeded by 1987 Norway
