= 1995 FIFA Women's World Cup squads =

Football tournament squads

Below are the rosters for the 1995 FIFA Women's World Cup tournament in Sweden. The 12 national teams involved in the tournament were required to register a squad of 20 players, including at least two goalkeepers. Only players in these squads were eligible to take part in the tournament.

== Group A ==
=== Brazil ===
Head coach: Ademar Fonseca

No.	Pos.	Player	Date of birth (age)	Caps	Goals	Club
1	GK	Meg	1 January 1956 (aged 39)			(Brazilian Football Confederation) Vasco da Gama
2	MF	Valeria	3 September 1968 (aged 26)			(Brazilian Football Confederation) Saad EC
3	DF	Elane	6 April 1968 (aged 27)			(Brazilian Football Confederation) Euroexport-SP
4	DF	Solange	29 March 1969 (aged 26)			(Brazilian Football Confederation) Euroexport-BA
5	MF	Leda Maria	16 April 1966 (aged 29)			(Brazilian Football Confederation) Vasco da Gama
6	MF	Fanta	14 September 1966 (aged 28)			(Brazilian Football Confederation) Vasco da Gama
7	FW	Pretinha	19 May 1975 (aged 20)			(Brazilian Football Confederation) Vasco da Gama
8	MF	Cenira (captain)	2 December 1965 (aged 29)			(Brazilian Football Confederation) Vasco da Gama
9	FW	Michael Jackson	19 November 1963 (aged 31)			(Brazilian Football Confederation) Saad EC
10	MF	Sissi	6 February 1967 (aged 28)			(Brazilian Football Confederation) Euroexport-SP
11	FW	Roseli	9 July 1969 (aged 25)			(Brazilian Football Confederation) Euroexport-SP
12	GK	Eliane	22 April 1971 (aged 24)			(Brazilian Football Confederation) Saad EC
13	DF	Nenê	31 March 1976 (aged 19)			(Brazilian Football Confederation) Saad EC
14	MF	Márcia Taffarel	15 March 1968 (aged 27)			?
15	FW	Nalvinha	14 July 1965 (aged 29)			(Brazilian Football Confederation) Saad EC
16	MF	Formiga	3 March 1978 (aged 17)			(Brazilian Football Confederation) Euroexport-BA
17	DF	Yara	13 February 1964 (aged 31)			(Brazilian Football Confederation) Gama
18	DF	Kátia	18 February 1977 (aged 18)			(Brazilian Football Confederation) Vasco da Gama
19	DF	Suzy	2 July 1967 (aged 27)			(Brazilian Football Confederation) Vasco da Gama
20	FW	Tânia	10 March 1974 (aged 21)			(Brazilian Football Confederation) Euroexport-BA

=== Germany ===
Head coach: Gero Bisanz

No.	Pos.	Player	Date of birth (age)	Caps	Goals	Club
1	GK	Manuela Goller	5 January 1971 (aged 24)	30		(German Football Association) Grün-Weiß Brauweiler
2	DF	Anouschka Bernhard	5 October 1970 (aged 24)	33		(German Football Association) FSV Frankfurt
3	DF	Birgitt Austermühl	8 October 1965 (aged 29)	41		(German Football Association) FSV Frankfurt
4	DF	Dagmar Pohlmann	7 February 1972 (aged 23)	26		(German Football Association) FSV Frankfurt
5	MF	Ursula Lohn	7 November 1966 (aged 28)	20		(German Football Association) TuS Ahrbach
6	MF	Maren Meinert	5 August 1973 (aged 21)	30		(German Football Association) FC Rumeln-Kaldenhausen
7	MF	Martina Voss	22 December 1967 (aged 27)	75		(German Football Association) FC Rumeln-Kaldenhausen
8	MF	Bettina Wiegmann	7 October 1971 (aged 23)	52		(German Football Association) Sportfreunde Siegen
9	FW	Heidi Mohr	29 May 1967 (aged 28)	82		(German Football Association) TuS Ahrbach
10	MF	Silvia Neid (captain)	2 May 1964 (aged 31)	95		(German Football Association) TSV Siegen
11	FW	Patricia Brocker	7 April 1966 (aged 29)	28		(German Football Association) TuS Niederkirchen
12	GK	Katja Kraus	23 November 1970 (aged 24)	1		(German Football Association) FSV Frankfurt
13	FW	Melanie Hoffmann	29 November 1974 (aged 20)	1		(German Football Association) FC Rumeln-Kaldenhausen
14	DF	Sandra Minnert	7 April 1973 (aged 22)	20		(German Football Association) FSV Frankfurt
15	DF	Claudia Klein	24 September 1971 (aged 23)	4		(German Football Association) Grün-Weiß Brauweiler
16	FW	Birgit Prinz	25 October 1977 (aged 17)	14		(German Football Association) FSV Frankfurt
17	DF	Tina Wunderlich	10 October 1977 (aged 17)	3		(German Football Association) SG Praunheim
18	MF	Pia Wunderlich	26 January 1975 (aged 20)	11		(German Football Association) SG Praunheim
19	MF	Sandra Smisek	3 July 1977 (aged 17)	2		(German Football Association) FSV Frankfurt
20	GK	Christine Francke	12 June 1974 (aged 20)	2		(German Football Association) TuS Ahrbach

=== Japan ===
Head coach: Tamotsu Suzuki

No.	Pos.	Player	Date of birth (age)	Caps	Goals	Club
1	GK	Junko Ozawa	12 July 1973 (aged 21)			(Japan Football Association) Tokyo Shidax LSC
2	DF	Yumi Tomei	6 January 1972 (aged 23)			(Japan Football Association) Yomiuri-Seiyu Beleza
3	DF	Rie Yamaki	10 February 1975 (aged 20)			(Japan Football Association) Nikko Securities Dream Ladies
4	DF	Maki Haneta	30 September 1972 (aged 22)			(Japan Football Association) Panasonic Bambina
5	DF	Ryoko Uno	11 September 1975 (aged 19)			(Japan Football Association) Yomiuri-Seiyu Beleza
6	DF	Kae Nishina	12 July 1972 (aged 22)			(Japan Football Association) Prima FC Kunoichi
7	MF	Homare Sawa	9 June 1978 (aged 16)			(Japan Football Association) Yomiuri-Seiyu Beleza
8	MF	Asako Takakura	19 April 1968 (aged 27)			(Japan Football Association) Yomiuri-Seiyu Beleza
9	MF	Futaba Kioka	22 November 1965 (aged 29)			(Japan Football Association) Suzuyo Shimizu FC
10	FW	Akemi Noda (captain)	13 October 1969 (aged 25)			(Japan Football Association) Takarazuka Bunnys
11	MF	Etsuko Handa	5 October 1965 (aged 29)			(Japan Football Association) Suzuyo Shimizu FC
12	DF	Yumi Obe	15 February 1975 (aged 20)			(Japan Football Association) Nikko Securities Dream Ladies
13	MF	Kaori Nagamine	6 March 1968 (aged 27)			(Japan Football Association) Suzuyo Shimizu FC
14	DF	Kaoru Kadohara	25 May 1970 (aged 25)			(Japan Football Association) Panasonic Bambina
15	FW	Tsuru Morimoto	9 November 1970 (aged 24)			(Japan Football Association) Nikko Securities Dream Ladies
16	MF	Nami Otake	30 July 1974 (aged 20)			(Japan Football Association) Yomiuri-Seiyu Beleza
17	FW	Tamaki Uchiyama	13 December 1972 (aged 22)			(Japan Football Association) Prima FC Kunoichi
18	FW	Inesu Emiko Takeoka	1 May 1971 (aged 24)			(Japan Football Association) Nikko Securities Dream Ladies
19	GK	Shiho Onodera	18 November 1973 (aged 21)			(Japan Football Association) Yomiuri-Seiyu Beleza
20	GK	Megumi Sakata	18 October 1971 (aged 23)			(Japan Football Association) Prima FC Kunoichi

=== Sweden ===
Head coach: Bengt Simonsson

No.	Pos.	Player	Date of birth (age)	Caps	Goals	Club
1	GK	Elisabeth Leidinge	6 March 1957 (aged 38)	107	0	(Swedish Football Association) Malmö
2	DF	Malin Lundgren	9 March 1967 (aged 28)	57	6	(Swedish Football Association) Malmö
3	DF	Åsa Jakobsson	2 June 1966 (aged 29)	37	0	(Swedish Football Association) Gideonsbergs IF
4	FW	Pia Sundhage (captain)	13 February 1960 (aged 35)	123	62	(Swedish Football Association) Hammarby IF
5	DF	Kristin Bengtsson	12 January 1970 (aged 25)	29	1	(Swedish Football Association) Hammarby IF
6	MF	Anna Pohjanen	25 January 1974 (aged 21)	7	0	(Swedish Football Association) Sunnanå SK
7	FW	Lena Videkull	9 December 1962 (aged 32)	98	59	(Swedish Football Association) Malmö
8	MF	Susanne Hedberg	26 June 1972 (aged 22)	53	7	(Swedish Football Association) Gideonsbergs IF
9	MF	Malin Andersson	5 April 1973 (aged 22)	17	6	(Swedish Football Association) Alvsjö AIK
10	FW	Anneli Andelén	21 June 1968 (aged 26)	79	35	(Swedish Football Association) Öxabäck/Mark IF
11	FW	Ulrika Kalte	19 May 1970 (aged 25)	35	16	(Swedish Football Association) Alvsjö AIK
12	GK	Annelie Nilsson	14 June 1971 (aged 23)	14	0	(Swedish Football Association) Sunnanå SK
13	DF	Annika Nessvold	24 February 1971 (aged 24)	17	3	(Swedish Football Association) Malmö
14	MF	Åsa Lönnqvist	14 April 1970 (aged 25)	17	0	(Swedish Football Association) Tyresö FF
15	MF	Anneli Olsson	7 February 1967 (aged 28)	10	2	(Swedish Football Association) Hammarby IF
16	MF	Eva Zeikfalvy	18 April 1967 (aged 28)	58	2	(Swedish Football Association) Malmö
17	MF	Malin Flink	4 September 1974 (aged 20)	1	0	(Swedish Football Association) Gideonsbergs IF
18	FW	Helen Nilsson	24 November 1970 (aged 24)	33	6	(Swedish Football Association) Gideonsbergs IF
19	FW	Anika Bozicevic	8 November 1972 (aged 22)	2	0	(Swedish Football Association) Malmö
20	MF	Sofia Johansson	5 September 1969 (aged 25)	5	1	(Swedish Football Association) Malmö

== Group B ==
=== Canada ===
Head coach: Sylvie Béliveau

No.	Pos.	Player	Date of birth (age)	Caps	Goals	Club
1	GK	Wendy Hawthorne	6 July 1960 (aged 34)	15	0	(Canadian Soccer Association) Surrey Marlins SC
2	FW	Helen Stoumbos	18 October 1970 (aged 24)	25	0	(Canadian Soccer Association) Kitchener Spirit
3	FW	Charmaine Hooper	15 January 1968 (aged 27)	37	22	(Japan Football Association) Prima FC Kunoichi
4	DF	Michelle Ring	28 November 1967 (aged 27)	42	2	(Canadian Soccer Association) Surrey Marlins SC
5	DF	Andrea Neil	26 October 1971 (aged 23)	16	2	(Canadian Soccer Association) Coquitlam Strikers
6	MF	Geri Donnelly (captain)	30 November 1965 (aged 29)	46	6	(Canadian Soccer Association) Coquitlam Strikers
7	FW	Isabelle Morneau	18 April 1976 (aged 19)	3	0	(Canadian Soccer Association) FC Brossard
8	DF	Nicole Sedgwick	19 January 1974 (aged 21)	8	0	(Canadian Soccer Association) Surrey Marlins SC
9	DF	Janine Helland	24 April 1970 (aged 25)	26	0	(Canadian Soccer Association) Edmonton Angels
10	MF	Veronica O'Brien	29 January 1971 (aged 24)	22	1	?
11	MF	Annie Caron	5 June 1964 (aged 31)	32	8	(United States Soccer Federation) Lakeshore United FC
12	MF	Joan McEachern	4 December 1963 (aged 31)	31	2	(Canadian Soccer Association) Coquitlam Strikers
13	MF	Angela Kelly	10 March 1971 (aged 24)	26	1	(United States Soccer Federation) NC State
14	DF	Cathy Ross	19 November 1967 (aged 27)	31	3	(Canadian Soccer Association) Coquitlam Strikers
15	DF	Suzanne Muir	7 June 1970 (aged 24)	7	0	(Canadian Soccer Association) Coquitlam Strikers
16	DF	Luce Mongrain	1 November 1971 (aged 23)	29	0	?
17	FW	Silvana Burtini	5 October 1969 (aged 25)	23	10	(Canadian Soccer Association) Surrey Marlins SC
18	GK	Carla Chin	5 October 1966 (aged 28)	26	0	(United States Soccer Federation) Columbus Ziggs
19	MF	Suzanne Gerrior	4 April 1973 (aged 22)	9	0	(United States Soccer Federation) NC State
20	GK	Tania Singfield	9 February 1970 (aged 25)	3	0	(Canadian Soccer Association) Omega

=== England ===
Head coach: Ted Copeland

No.	Pos.	Player	Date of birth (age)	Caps	Goals	Club
1	GK	Pauline Cope	16 February 1969 (aged 26)			(The Football Association) Arsenal Ladies
2	MF	Hope Powell	8 December 1966 (aged 28)			(The Football Association) Croydon Women
3	DF	Tina Mapes	21 January 1971 (aged 24)			(The Football Association) Croydon Women
4	DF	Samantha Britton	8 December 1973 (aged 21)			(The Football Association) Arsenal Ladies
5	DF	Clare Taylor	22 May 1965 (aged 30)			(The Football Association) Liverpool Ladies
6	MF	Gillian Coultard	22 July 1963 (aged 31)			(The Football Association) Doncaster Belles
7	MF	Marieanne Spacey	13 February 1966 (aged 29)			(The Football Association) Arsenal Ladies
8	MF	Debbie Bampton (captain)	7 October 1961 (aged 33)			(The Football Association) Croydon Women
9	FW	Karen Farley	2 September 1970 (aged 24)			(Swedish Football Association) Hammarby IF
10	MF	Karen Burke	14 June 1971 (aged 23)			(The Football Association) Liverpool Ladies
11	DF	Brenda Sempare	9 November 1961 (aged 33)			(The Football Association) Croydon Women
12	MF	Kerry Davis	8 February 1962 (aged 33)			(The Football Association) Croydon Women
13	GK	Lesley Higgs	25 October 1965 (aged 29)			(The Football Association) Wembley Ladies
14	FW	Karen Walker	29 July 1969 (aged 25)			(The Football Association) Doncaster Belles
15	MF	Sian Williams	2 February 1968 (aged 27)			(The Football Association) Arsenal Ladies
16	DF	Donna Smith	17 January 1967 (aged 28)			(The Football Association) Croydon Women
17	DF	Louise Waller	30 July 1969 (aged 25)			(The Football Association) Millwall Lionesses
18	DF	Mary Phillip	14 March 1977 (aged 18)			(The Football Association) Millwall Lionesses
19	DF	Julie Fletcher	28 September 1974 (aged 20)			(The Football Association) Millwall Lionesses
20	MF	Becky Easton	16 April 1974 (aged 21)			(The Football Association) Liverpool Ladies

=== Nigeria ===
Head coach: Paul Hamilton

No.	Pos.	Player	Date of birth (age)	Caps	Goals	Club
1	GK	Ann Chiejine	2 February 1974 (aged 21)			(Nigeria Football Federation) Princess Jegede
2	DF	Florence Omagbemi (captain)	2 February 1975 (aged 20)			(Nigeria Football Federation) Princess Jegede
3	DF	Ngozi Ezeocha	12 October 1973 (aged 21)			(Nigeria Football Federation) Princess Jegede
4	FW	Adaku Okoroafor	18 November 1974 (aged 20)			(Nigeria Football Federation) Princess Jegede
5	DF	Omo-Love Branch	10 January 1974 (aged 21)			(Nigeria Football Federation) Rivers Angels
6	MF	Yinka Kudaisi	25 August 1975 (aged 19)			(Nigeria Football Federation) Abiola Babes
7	MF	Nkechi Mbilitam	5 April 1974 (aged 21)			(Nigeria Football Federation) Pelican Stars
8	MF	Rita Nwadike	11 March 1974 (aged 21)			(Nigeria Football Federation) Rivers Angels
9	FW	Ngozi Eucharia Uche	18 June 1973 (aged 21)			(Nigeria Football Federation) Ufuoma Babes
10	DF	Mavis Ogun	24 August 1973 (aged 21)			(Nigeria Football Federation) Ufuoma Babes
11	DF	Prisca Emeafu	30 March 1972 (aged 23)			(Nigeria Football Federation) Rivers Angels
12	MF	Mercy Akide	26 August 1975 (aged 19)			(Nigeria Football Federation) Ufuoma Babes
13	MF	Nkiru Okosieme	3 January 1972 (aged 23)			(Nigeria Football Federation) Rivers Angels
14	DF	Phoebe Ebimiekumo	17 January 1974 (aged 21)			(Nigeria Football Federation) Ufuoma Babes
15	FW	Maureen Mmadu	5 July 1975 (aged 19)			(Nigeria Football Federation) Princess Jegede
16	DF	Ugochi Opara	27 May 1976 (aged 19)			?
17	GK	Louisa Akpagu	22 December 1974 (aged 20)			(Nigeria Football Federation) Princess Jegede
18	MF	Patience Avre	6 October 1976 (aged 18)			(Nigeria Football Federation) Princess Jegede
19	GK	Diana Nwaiwu	10 October 1973 (aged 21)			(Nigeria Football Federation) Rivers Angels
20	MF	Ann Mukoro	27 May 1975 (aged 20)			(Nigeria Football Federation) Rivers Angels

=== Norway ===
Head coach: Even Pellerud

No.	Pos.	Player	Date of birth (age)	Caps	Goals	Club
1	GK	Bente Nordby	23 July 1974 (aged 20)			(Norwegian Football Federation) SK Sprint/Jeløy
2	DF	Tina Svensson	16 November 1966 (aged 28)			(Norwegian Football Federation) Asker
3	DF	Gro Espeseth	30 October 1972 (aged 22)			(Norwegian Football Federation) IL Sandviken
4	MF	Anne Nymark Andersen	28 September 1972 (aged 22)			(Norwegian Football Federation) Bjørnar IL
5	DF	Nina Nymark Andersen	28 September 1972 (aged 22)			(Norwegian Football Federation) IL Sandviken
6	MF	Hege Riise	18 July 1969 (aged 25)			(Norwegian Football Federation) Setskog/Høland FK
7	MF	Tone Haugen	6 February 1964 (aged 31)			(Japan Football Association) Nikko Sec. Ladies FC
8	MF	Heidi Støre (captain)	4 July 1963 (aged 31)			(Norwegian Football Federation) Kolbotn IL
9	FW	Kristin Sandberg	23 March 1972 (aged 23)			(Norwegian Football Federation) Asker
10	FW	Linda Medalen	17 June 1965 (aged 29)			(Japan Football Association) Nikko Sec. Ladies FC
11	FW	Ann Kristin Aarønes	19 January 1973 (aged 22)			(Norwegian Football Federation) Trondheims-Ørn SK
12	GK	Reidun Seth	9 June 1966 (aged 28)			(Swedish Football Association) Öxabäck IF
13	DF	Merete Myklebust	16 May 1973 (aged 22)			(Norwegian Football Federation) Trondheims-Ørn SK
14	MF	Hege Gunnerød	22 November 1973 (aged 21)			(Norwegian Football Federation) Asker
15	FW	Randi Leinan	9 April 1968 (aged 27)			(Norwegian Football Federation) Trondheims-Ørn SK
16	FW	Marianne Pettersen	4 December 1975 (aged 19)			(Norwegian Football Federation) Gjelleråsen IF
17	DF	Anita Waage	31 July 1971 (aged 23)			(Norwegian Football Federation) Trondheims-Ørn SK
18	MF	Tone Gunn Frustøl	21 June 1975 (aged 19)			(Norwegian Football Federation) FK Donn
19	DF	Agnete Carlsen	15 January 1971 (aged 24)			(Norwegian Football Federation) Kolbotn IL
20	GK	Ingrid Sternhoff	25 February 1977 (aged 18)			(Norwegian Football Federation) SK Haugar

== Group C ==
=== Australia ===
Head coach: (Scotland) Tom Sermanni

No.	Pos.	Player	Date of birth (age)	Caps	Goals	Club
1	GK	Tracey Wheeler	26 September 1967 (aged 27)			(Football Australia) Forrestfield United
2	DF	Sarah Cooper	10 August 1969 (aged 25)			(Football Australia) Mindil Aces
3	DF	Jane Oakley	25 June 1966 (aged 28)			(Football Australia) Berwick City
4	MF	Julie Murray (captain)	28 April 1970 (aged 25)			(Football Australia) Sydney Olympic
5	MF	Cheryl Salisbury	8 March 1974 (aged 21)			(Football Australia) Stirling Macedonia
6	DF	Anissa Tann	10 October 1967 (aged 27)			(Football Australia) Marconi Stallions
7	DF	Alison Forman	17 March 1969 (aged 26)			(Danish Football Association) Fortuna Hjørring
8	DF	Sonia Gegenhuber	28 September 1970 (aged 24)			(Football Australia) Eastern Suburbs
9	FW	Angela Iannotta	22 March 1971 (aged 24)			(Italian Football Federation) Agliana CF
10	FW	Sunni Hughes	6 September 1968 (aged 26)			(Japan Football Association) Panasonic Bambina
11	MF	Kaylene Janssen	18 August 1968 (aged 26)			(Football Australia) Eastern Suburbs
12	FW	Michelle Watson	17 June 1976 (aged 18)			(Football Australia) Marconi Stallions
13	DF	Traci Bartlett	17 May 1972 (aged 23)			(Football Australia) Marconi Stallions
14	MF	Denie Pentecost	23 April 1970 (aged 25)			(Football Australia) Sydney Olympic
15	MF	Kim Lembryk	19 February 1966 (aged 29)			(Football Australia) Marconi Stallions
16	FW	Lisa Casagrande	29 May 1978 (aged 17)			(Football Australia) Goonellabah Hornets
17	DF	Sacha Wainwright	2 June 1972 (aged 23)			(Football Australia) Weston Creek
18	DF	Louise McMurtrie	26 April 1976 (aged 19)			(Football Australia) Queensland Academy of Sport
19	FW	Lizzy Claydon	11 November 1972 (aged 22)			(Football Australia) Stirling Vasto
20	GK	Claire Nichols	7 August 1975 (aged 19)			(Football Australia) Liverpool (NSW)

=== China PR ===
Head coach: Ma Yuanan

No.	Pos.	Player	Date of birth (age)	Caps	Goals	Club
1	GK	Zhong Honglian	27 October 1967 (aged 27)			(Chinese Football Association) Dalian
2	MF	Wang Liping	11 December 1973 (aged 21)			(Chinese Football Association) Hebei
3	DF	Fan Yunjie	29 April 1972 (aged 23)			(Chinese Football Association) Henan
4	DF	Yu Hongqi	2 February 1973 (aged 22)			(Chinese Football Association) Dalian
5	MF	Zhou Yang	2 January 1971 (aged 24)			(Chinese Football Association) Dalian
6	MF	Zhou Hua	10 March 1969 (aged 26)			(Chinese Football Association) Dalian
7	FW	Wei Haiying	1 May 1971 (aged 24)			(Chinese Football Association) Guangdong
8	MF	Shui Qingxia	18 December 1966 (aged 28)			(Chinese Football Association) Shanghai SVA
9	FW	Sun Wen (captain)	4 June 1973 (aged 22)			(Chinese Football Association) Shanghai SVA
10	MF	Liu Ailing	5 February 1967 (aged 28)			(Chinese Football Association) Beijing
11	MF	Sun Qingmei	19 June 1966 (aged 28)			(Chinese Football Association) Hebei
12	DF	Wen Lirong	10 February 1969 (aged 26)			(Chinese Football Association) Beijing
13	DF	Niu Lijie	4 December 1969 (aged 25)			(Chinese Football Association) Changchun
14	MF	Xie Huilin	17 January 1975 (aged 20)			(Chinese Football Association) Shanghai SVA
15	FW	Shi Guihong	13 February 1968 (aged 27)			(Chinese Football Association) Guangdong
16	MF	Chen Yufeng	17 January 1970 (aged 25)			(Chinese Football Association) Shandong
17	MF	Zhao Lihong	25 December 1972 (aged 22)			(Chinese Football Association) Guangdong
18	DF	Man Yanling	11 September 1972 (aged 22)			(Chinese Football Association) Beijing
19	MF	Li Ying	21 October 1973 (aged 21)			(Chinese Football Association) Beijing
20	GK	Gao Hong	27 November 1967 (aged 27)			(Chinese Football Association) Guangdong

=== Denmark ===
Head coach: Keld Gantzhorn

No.	Pos.	Player	Date of birth (age)	Caps	Goals	Club
1	GK	Dorthe Larsen	8 August 1969 (aged 25)			(Danish Football Association) Fortuna Hjørring
2	MF	Louise Hansen	5 April 1975 (aged 20)			(Danish Football Association) BK Rødovre
3	DF	Kamma Flæng	30 March 1976 (aged 19)			(Danish Football Association) HEI Aarhus
4	DF	Lene Terp	15 April 1973 (aged 22)			(Danish Football Association) Vejle B
5	DF	Katrine Pedersen	13 April 1977 (aged 18)			(Danish Football Association) HEI Aarhus
6	DF	Rikke Holm	22 March 1972 (aged 23)			(Danish Football Association) OB
7	MF	Annette Laursen	6 February 1975 (aged 20)			(Danish Football Association) HEI Aarhus
8	MF	Lisbet Kolding	6 April 1965 (aged 30)			(Danish Football Association) HEI Aarhus
9	MF	Helle Jensen (captain)	23 March 1969 (aged 26)			(Danish Football Association) Fortuna Hjørring
10	MF	Birgit Christensen	31 May 1976 (aged 19)			(Danish Football Association) Fortuna Hjørring
11	FW	Gitte Krogh	13 May 1977 (aged 18)			(Danish Football Association) HEI Aarhus
12	MF	Anne Dot Eggers Nielsen	6 November 1975 (aged 19)			(Danish Football Association) HEI Aarhus
13	FW	Christina Hansen	5 June 1970 (aged 25)			(Danish Football Association) Hillerød
14	FW	Lene Madsen	11 March 1973 (aged 22)			(Danish Football Association) Fortuna Hjørring
15	MF	Christina Bonde	28 September 1973 (aged 21)			(Danish Football Association) BK Rødovre
16	GK	Helle Bjerregaard	21 June 1968 (aged 26)			(Danish Football Association) BK Rødovre
17	MF	Karina Christensen	1 July 1973 (aged 21)			(Danish Football Association) Fortuna Hjørring
18	DF	Bettina Allentoft	16 November 1973 (aged 21)			(Danish Football Association) HEI Aarhus
19	MF	Jeanne Axelsen	3 January 1968 (aged 27)			(Danish Football Association) Hillerød
20	MF	Christina Petersen	17 September 1974 (aged 20)			(Danish Football Association) Fortuna Hjørring

=== United States ===
Head coach: Tony DiCicco

No.	Pos.	Player	Date of birth (age)	Caps	Goals	Club
1	GK	Briana Scurry	7 September 1971 (aged 23)		0	(United States Soccer Federation) University of Massachusetts Amherst
2	DF	Thori Staples	17 April 1974 (aged 21)		0	(United States Soccer Federation) NC State
3	MF	Holly Manthei	8 February 1976 (aged 19)		0	(United States Soccer Federation) University of Notre Dame
4	DF	Carla Overbeck (captain)	9 May 1968 (aged 27)		2	(United States Soccer Federation) University of North Carolina
5	MF	Tiffany Roberts	5 May 1977 (aged 18)		5	(United States Soccer Federation) University of North Carolina
6	FW	Debbie Keller	24 March 1975 (aged 20)		0	(United States Soccer Federation) University of North Carolina
7	FW	Sarah Rafanelli	7 June 1972 (aged 22)		8	(United States Soccer Federation) Santa Clara University
8	DF	Linda Hamilton	4 June 1969 (aged 26)		1	(United States Soccer Federation) University of North Carolina
9	MF	Mia Hamm	17 March 1972 (aged 23)		47	(United States Soccer Federation) University of North Carolina
10	FW	Michelle Akers	1 February 1966 (aged 29)		83	(United States Soccer Federation) University of Central Florida
11	MF	Julie Foudy	23 January 1971 (aged 24)		11	(United States Soccer Federation) Stanford University
12	FW	Carin Jennings-Gabarra	9 January 1965 (aged 30)		48	(United States Soccer Federation) UC Santa Barbara
13	MF	Kristine Lilly	22 July 1971 (aged 23)		33	(United States Soccer Federation) University of North Carolina
14	DF	Joy Fawcett	8 February 1968 (aged 27)		14	(United States Soccer Federation) UC Berkeley
15	MF	Tisha Venturini	3 March 1973 (aged 22)		12	(United States Soccer Federation) University of North Carolina
16	FW	Tiffeny Milbrett	23 October 1972 (aged 22)		9	(United States Soccer Federation) University of Portland
17	DF	Jennifer Lalor	5 September 1974 (aged 20)		1	(United States Soccer Federation) Santa Clara University
18	GK	Saskia Webber	13 June 1971 (aged 23)		0	(United States Soccer Federation) Rutgers University
19	MF	Amanda Cromwell	15 June 1970 (aged 24)		1	(United States Soccer Federation) University of Virginia
20	GK	Mary Harvey	4 June 1965 (aged 30)		0	(United States Soccer Federation) Santa Clara University
