= List of Australia women's international soccer players =

The Australia women's national soccer team represents Australia in international association football. It is fielded by Football Australia, the governing body of soccer in Australia, and competes as a member of the Asian Football Confederation, having previously been a part of the Oceania Football Confederation. This is a list of Australia women's international soccer players who have played for the national team in an "A" international match.

A representative Australian team competed at the 1975 AFC Women's Championship, although the team consisted primarily of players from a club in New South Wales, St George Budapest, with some debate as to whether a national selection process was ever conducted. This team was officially recognised by Football Australia, in May 2022, with all 16 members of the squad officially awarded caps. Pat O’Connor captained this team, and her husband Joe was head coach. Previously, the first official international football match was recognised as having taken place on 6 October 1979. Over 240 players have represented Australia in a full "A" international match since then.

Emily van Egmond, cap no. 172, is Australia's most capped player with 175 appearances for the national team. Sam Kerr, cap no. 168, is the Matildas highest goal scorer with 76 goals.

== Players ==
Major data sourced from here:

Caps and goals are current as of 13 October 2026 after the match against Haiti. Players in bold are currently active, having been called up to the squad in the last 12 months.

Cap No.	Player	Span	Caps	Goals	Debut			Last or most recent match		
Cap No.	Player	Span	Caps	Goals	Date	Opponent	Location	Date	Opponent	Location
01	Patricia O'Connor	1975	4	2	25 August 1975	Thailand	Hong Kong	2 September 1975	Malaysia	Hong Kong
1	Julie Dolan	1979–1988	18	4	6 October 1979	New Zealand	Sydney, Australia	5 June 1988	Norway	Jiangmen, China
2	Shona Bass	1979–1984	8	0	6 October 1979	New Zealand	Sydney, Australia	13 October 1984	Chinese Taipei	Taipei, Taiwan
3	Sandra Brentnall	1979–1983	11	8	6 October 1979	New Zealand	Sydney, Australia	4 December 1983	New Zealand	Nouméa, New Caledonia
4	Julie Clayton	1979	2	0	6 October 1979	New Zealand	Sydney, Australia	8 October 1979	New Zealand	Sydney, Australia
5	Kim Coates	1979–1983	6	0	6 October 1979	New Zealand	Sydney, Australia	28 November 1983	New Zealand	Nouméa, New Caledonia
6	Cindy Heydon	1979–1984	11	5	6 October 1979	New Zealand	Sydney, Australia	13 October 1984	Chinese Taipei	Taipei, Taiwan
7	Sharon Mateljan	1979–1986	8	2	6 October 1979	New Zealand	Sydney, Australia	31 March 1986	Chinese Taipei	Christchurch, New Zealand
8	Toni McMahon	1979–1988	10	0	6 October 1979	New Zealand	Sydney, Australia	5 June 1988	Norway	Jiangmen, China
9	Sue Monteath	1979–1987	23	4	6 October 1979	New Zealand	Sydney, Australia	15 December 1987	Chinese Taipei	Taipei, Taiwan
10	Rose van Bruinessen	1979–1984	14	1	6 October 1979	New Zealand	Sydney, Australia	13 October 1984	Chinese Taipei	Taipei, Taiwan
11	Leigh Wardell	1979–1988	14	0	6 October 1979	New Zealand	Sydney, Australia	8 June 1988	China	Guangzhou, China
12	Fiona McKenzie	1979	2	0	6 October 1979	New Zealand	Sydney, Australia	8 October 1979	New Zealand	Sydney, Australia
13	Diana Hall	1979–1980	4	0	8 October 1979	New Zealand	Sydney, Australia	24 May 1980	New Zealand	Christchurch, New Zealand
14	Judy Pettitt	1979–1984	3	0	8 October 1979	New Zealand	Sydney, Australia	13 October 1984	Chinese Taipei	Taipei, Taiwan
15	Carla Groeschel	1979–1979	1	0	13 October 1979	New Zealand	Brisbane, Australia	13 October 1979	New Zealand	Brisbane, Australia
16	Jamie Rosman	1980	6	0	18 May 1980	New Zealand	Auckland, New Zealand	24 May 1980	New Zealand	Christchurch, New Zealand
17	Theresa Jones	1980–1988	10	0	18 May 1980	New Zealand	Auckland, New Zealand	8 June 1988	China	Guangzhou, China
18	Kim Lembryk	1981–1995	23	4	5 October 1981	New Zealand	Auckland, New Zealand	5 August 1995	Chinese Taipei	Richmond, United States
19	Kerry Millman	1981–1989	21	1	5 October 1981	New Zealand	Auckland, New Zealand	31 March 1989	Chinese Taipei	Brisbane, Australia
20	Julie Porter	1981–1984	6	4	5 October 1981	New Zealand	Auckland, New Zealand	13 October 1984	Chinese Taipei	Taipei, Taiwan
21	Leanne Priestley	1981–1989	13	3	5 October 1981	New Zealand	Auckland, New Zealand	31 March 1989	Chinese Taipei	Brisbane, Australia
22	Tracey Singleton	1981–1984	4	0	5 October 1981	New Zealand	Auckland, New Zealand	13 October 1984	Chinese Taipei	Taipei, Taiwan
23	Leah Wright	1981	1	0	5 October 1981	New Zealand	Auckland, New Zealand	5 October 1981	New Zealand	Auckland, New Zealand
24	Marie Russell	1981	1	0	5 October 1981	New Zealand	Auckland, New Zealand	5 October 1981	New Zealand	Auckland, New Zealand
25	Sharon Wass	1981–1991	7	2	5 October 1981	New Zealand	Auckland, New Zealand	24 May 1991	New Zealand	Sydney, Australia
26	Renaye Iserief	1983–1987	16	9	28 November 1983	New Zealand	Nouméa, New Caledonia	19 December 1987	New Zealand	Taipei, Taiwan
27	Vicki Salmons	1983–1984	5	0	28 November 1983	New Zealand	Nouméa, New Caledonia	13 October 1984	Chinese Taipei	Taipei, Taiwan
28	Kristen Theile	1983–1984	7	0	28 November 1983	New Zealand	Nouméa, New Caledonia	13 October 1984	Chinese Taipei	Taipei, Taiwan
29	Joanne Millman	1983–1988	23	0	28 November 1983	New Zealand	Nouméa, New Caledonia	1 June 1988	Brazil	Jiangmen, China
30	Karen Menzies	1983–1989	7	0	30 November 1983	New Caledonia	Nouméa, New Caledonia	28 March 1989	Papua New Guinea	Brisbane, Australia
31	Margaret Petrov	1984	3	0	8 October 1984	Japan	Taipei, Taiwan	13 October 1984	Chinese Taipei	Taipei, Taiwan
32	Lisa Dunne	1984–1999	10	0	12 October 1984	New Zealand	Taipei, Taiwan	28 October 1999	China	Zhuhai, China
33	Mandi Langlar	1984–1988	5	0	12 October 1984	New Zealand	Taipei, Taiwan	1 June 1988	Brazil	Jiangmen, China
34	Debra Bonshore	1984–1991	3	0	13 October 1984	Chinese Taipei	Taipei, Taiwan	20 May 1991	New Zealand	Sydney, Australia
35	Kim Dunlop	1984	1	0	13 October 1984	Chinese Taipei	Taipei, Taiwan	13 October 1984	Chinese Taipei	Taipei, Taiwan
36	Jane Oakley	1984–1995	28	2	13 October 1984	Chinese Taipei	Taipei, Taiwan	10 June 1995	United States	Helsingborg, Sweden
37	Andrea Martin	1986	3	1	29 March 1986	New Zealand	Christchurch, New Zealand	4 April 1986	Chinese Taipei	Christchurch, New Zealand
38	Teri McQueen	1986	2	0	29 March 1986	New Zealand	Christchurch, New Zealand	31 March 1986	Chinese Taipei	Christchurch, New Zealand
39	Mariana Milanovic	1986–1987	4	0	29 March 1986	New Zealand	Christchurch, New Zealand	13 December 1987	Hong Kong	Kaohsiung, Taiwan
40	Sabine Buschmann	1986	1	0	31 March 1986	Chinese Taipei	Christchurch, New Zealand	31 March 1986	Chinese Taipei	Christchurch, New Zealand
41	Sue Buswell	1986–1987	8	0	31 March 1986	Chinese Taipei	Christchurch, New Zealand	19 December 1987	Chinese Taipei	Taipei, Taiwan
42	Moya Dodd	1986–1995	12	1	31 March 1986	Chinese Taipei	Christchurch, New Zealand	20 January 1995	United States	Phoenix, United States
43	Lisa Rader	1986	1	0	31 March 1986	Chinese Taipei	Christchurch, New Zealand	31 March 1986	Chinese Taipei	Christchurch, New Zealand
44	Sharon Read	1987–1988	7	0	12 December 1987	Canada	Kaohsiung, Taiwan	5 June 1988	Norway	Jiangmen, China
45	Janine McPhee	1987–1991	6	0	12 December 1987	Canada	Kaohsiung, Taiwan	20 May 1991	New Zealand	Sydney, Australia
46	Michelle Sawyers	1987–1991	13	0	12 December 1987	Canada	Kaohsiung, Taiwan	20 May 1991	New Zealand	Sydney, Australia
47	Lyn Spencer	1987	2	0	12 December 1987	Canada	Kaohsiung, Taiwan	19 December 1987	Chinese Taipei	Taipei, Taiwan
48	Amanda George	1987	2	0	13 December 1987	Hong Kong	Kaohsiung, Taiwan	19 December 1987	Chinese Taipei	Taipei, Taiwan
49	Jill Latimer	1987	2	0	13 December 1987	Hong Kong	Kaohsiung, Taiwan	19 December 1987	Chinese Taipei	Taipei, Taiwan
50	Janelle Renshaw	1987	3	0	13 December 1987	Hong Kong	Kaohsiung, Taiwan	19 December 1987	Chinese Taipei	Taipei, Taiwan
51	Julie Murray	1987–2000	68	19	13 December 1987	Hong Kong	Kaohsiung, Taiwan	13 September 2000	Germany	Canberra, Australia
52	Debbie Nichols	1988–1989	9	0	1 June 1988	Brazil	Jiangmen, China	4 December 1989	Japan	Kanagawa, Japan
53	Janine Riddington	1988–1991	6	5	1 June 1988	Brazil	Jiangmen, China	20 May 1991	New Zealand	Sydney, Australia
54	Anissa Tann	1988–2002	102	8	1 June 1988	Brazil	Jiangmen, China	9 October 2002	Italy	Cary, United States
55	Carol Vinson	1988–1991	13	12	1 June 1988	Brazil	Jiangmen, China	20 May 1991	New Zealand	Sydney, Australia
56	Sunni Hughes	1989–2000	63	24	26 March 1989	New Zealand	Brisbane, Australia	19 September 2000	Brazil	Sydney, Australia
57	Kristine James	1989	3	0	26 March 1989	New Zealand	Brisbane, Australia	4 December 1989	Japan	Kanagawa, Japan
58	Tracey Wheeler	1989–2000	49	0	26 March 1989	New Zealand	Brisbane, Australia	19 September 2000	Brazil	Sydney, Australia
59	Dalys Carmody	1989	3	0	26 March 1989	New Zealand	Brisbane, Australia	4 December 1989	Japan	Kanagawa, Japan
60	Karen Harris	1989	2	0	28 March 1989	Papua New Guinea	Brisbane, Australia	4 December 1989	Japan	Kanagawa, Japan
61	Alison Forman	1989–2002	77	7	4 December 1989	Japan	Kanagawa, Japan	9 April 2002	France	Limoges, France
62	Carolyn Monk	1989	2	0	4 December 1989	Japan	Kanagawa, Japan	5 December 1989	Japan	Kanagawa, Japan
63	Sonia Gegenhuber	1991–1999	60	1	20 May 1991	New Zealand	Sydney, Australia	18 March 1999	China	Albufeira, Portugal
64	Kaylene Janssen	1991–1995	15	0	20 May 1991	New Zealand	Sydney, Australia	13 May 1995	Canada	Vancouver, Canada
65	Sharon Young	1991	4	0	20 May 1991	New Zealand	Sydney, Australia	20 May 1991	New Zealand	Sydney, Australia
66	Angela Iannotta	1991–1999	33	10	21 May 1991	Papua New Guinea	Sydney, Australia	26 June 1999	China	East Rutherford, United States
67	Traci Bartlett	1991–2002	51	1	21 May 1991	Papua New Guinea	Sydney, Australia	19 January 2002	South Korea	Bendigo, Australia
68	Sharon Black	1991–2002	61	20	20 October 1991	New Zealand	Christchurch, New Zealand	9 April 2002	France	Limoges, France
69	Sarah Cooper	1991–2001	55	2	20 October 1991	New Zealand	Christchurch, New Zealand	17 January 2001	France	Gold Coast, Australia
70	Donna Fredrickson	1991	2	0	20 October 1991	New Zealand	Christchurch, New Zealand	20 May 1991	New Zealand	Sydney, Australia
71	Tracey Jenkins	1991	1	0	23 October 1991	New Zealand	Wellington, New Zealand	23 October 1991	New Zealand	Wellington, New Zealand
72	Jackie Hadden	1994	1	0	20 April 1994	Russia	Brisbane, Australia	20 April 1994	Russia	Brisbane, Australia
73	Claire Nichols	1994–2003	19	0	20 April 1994	Russia	Brisbane, Australia	1 February 2003	Sweden	Canberra, Australia
74	Denie Pentecost	1994–1995	14	1	20 April 1994	Russia	Brisbane, Australia	19 March 1995	New Zealand	Canberra, Australia
75	Cheryl Salisbury	1994–2009	151	38	20 April 1994	Russia	Brisbane, Australia	31 January 2009	Italy	Sydney, Australia
76	Sacha Wainwright	1994–2004	65	3	20 April 1994	Russia	Brisbane, Australia	17 August 2004	Sweden	Volos, Greece
77	Trena Youngblutt	1994–1996	4	0	20 April 1994	Russia	Brisbane, Australia	11 July 1996	China	Bradenton, United States
78	Lizzy Claydon	1994–1996	16	2	20 April 1994	Russia	Brisbane, Australia	11 July 1996	China	Bradenton, United States
79	Lisa Casagrande	1994–2002	60	13	14 October 1994	New Zealand	Port Moresby, Papua New Guinea	16 January 2002	South Korea	Wagga Wagga, Australia
80	Bridgette Starr	1994–2002	53	1	14 October 1994	New Zealand	Port Moresby, Papua New Guinea	9 April 2002	France	Limoges, France
81	Amanda Paterson	1994–1997	2	0	14 October 1994	New Zealand	Port Moresby, Papua New Guinea	11 August 1997	Hungary	Csákvár, Hungary
82	Michelle Prouten	1994–1995	2	0	18 October 1994	New Zealand	Port Moresby, Papua New Guinea	19 March 1995	New Zealand	Canberra, Australia
83	Michelle Watson	1994–1995	18	3	18 October 1994	New Zealand	Port Moresby, Papua New Guinea	5 August 1995	Chinese Taipei	Richmond, United States
84	Karly Pumpa	1994-1995	4	2	18 October 1994	New Zealand	Port Moresby, Papua New Guinea	23 January 1995	United States	Phoenix, United States
85	Kim Revell	1995–2001	31	5	23 January 1995	United States	Phoenix, United States	17 January 2001	France	Gold Coast, Australia
86	Justine Fisher	1995	2	0	23 January 1995	United States	Phoenix, United States	19 March 1995	New Zealand	Canberra, Australia
87	Louise McMurtrie	1995–1996	19	0	17 March 1995	New Zealand	Canberra, Australia	11 July 1996	China	Bradenton, United States
88	Denise Lofthouse	1995	1	0	19 March 1995	New Zealand	Canberra, Australia	19 March 1995	New Zealand	Canberra, Australia
89	Dianne Alagich	1995–2008	86	3	29 July 1995	Norway	Worcester, United States	12 July 2008	New Zealand	Sydney, Australia
90	Katrina Boyd	1996–2000	28	9	24 March 1996	New Zealand	Auckland, New Zealand	13 January 2000	United States	Adelaide, Australia
91	Joanne Peters	1996–2009	110	28	24 March 1996	New Zealand	Auckland, New Zealand	7 February 2009	Italy	Canberra, Australia
92	Kristyn Swaffer	1996–2003	30	1	24 March 1996	New Zealand	Auckland, New Zealand	1 February 2003	Sweden	Canberra, Australia
93	Tammie Thornton	1996–1997	19	0	24 March 1996	New Zealand	Auckland, New Zealand	27 August 1997	Finland	Helsinki, Finland
94	Amy Wilson	1996–2003	39	2	24 March 1996	New Zealand	Auckland, New Zealand	6 September 2003	Scotland	Livingston, Scotland
95	Shelley Youman	1996–1999	20	0	4 July 1996	United States	Tampa, United States	20 March 1999	Sweden	Loulé, Portugal
96	Bryony Duus	1996–2003	47	2	4 July 1996	United States	Tampa, United States	28 September 2003	Ghana	Portland, United States
97	Kelly Golebiowski	1996–2005	64	14	4 July 1996	United States	Tampa, United States	29 March 2005	Japan	Sydney, Australia
98	Belinda Kitching	1996–1999	32	0	9 July 1996	Japan	Fort Lauderdale, United States	26 June 1999	China	East Rutherford, United States
99	Amy Taylor	1997–2005	27	2	28 February 1997	United States	Melbourne, Australia	29 March 2005	Japan	Sydney, Australia
100	Kristy Moore (Note: Also has been capped for England (12 caps: 2002―2005).)	1997	7	1	7 August 1997	Sweden	Östersund, Sweden	11 August 1997	Hungary	Csákvár, Hungary
101	Alicia Ferguson	1997–2007	66	6	11 August 1997	Hungary	Csákvár, Hungary	20 September 2007	Canada	Chengdu, China
102	Tracie McGovern	1997–1999	4	0	16 November 1997	China	Lismore, Australia	13 January 1999	Italy	Canberra, Australia
103	Trudy Diamond	1997	1	0	19 November 1997	New Zealand	Newcastle, Australia	19 November 1997	New Zealand	Newcastle, Australia
104	Natalie Thomas	1998–2002	13	3	9 October 1998	American Samoa	Auckland, New Zealand	9 October 2002	Italy	Cary, United States
105	Joanne Butland	1999–2000	4	0	8 January 1999	Italy	Sydney, Australia	11 August 2000	North Korea	Pyongyang, North Korea
106	Peita-Claire Hepperlin	1999–2002	19	0	10 January 1999	Canada	Canberra, Australia	9 October 2002	Italy	Cary, United States
107	Danielle Small	1999–2008	44	10	10 January 1999	Canada	Canberra, Australia	12 July 2008	New Zealand	Sydney, Australia
108	Heather Garriock	1999–2011	130	20	28 October 1999	China	Zhuhai, China	11 September 2011	South Korea	Jinan, China
109	Leanne Trimboli	2000	3	0	10 January 2000	Czech Republic	Melbourne, Australia	4 June 2000	Canada	Sydney, Australia
110	Kate McShea	2000–2009	73	2	31 May 2000	Japan	Canberra, Australia	7 February 2009	Italy	Canberra, Australia
111	April Mann	2001–2004	28	18	11 January 2001	France	Coffs Harbour, Australia	6 March 2004	Fiji	Ba, Fiji
112	Taryn Rockall	2001–2003	11	0	11 January 2001	France	Coffs Harbour, Australia	14 September 2003	Canada	Kingston, Canada
113	Rhian Davies	2002–2007	66	3	13 January 2002	South Korea	Wagga Wagga, Australia	16 August 2007	China	Tianjin, China
114	Gillian Foster	2002–2005	39	1	13 January 2002	South Korea	Wagga Wagga, Australia	1 February 2005	Russia	Quanzhou, China
115	Zoe Nolan	2002	1	0	13 January 2002	South Korea	Wagga Wagga, Australia	13 January 2002	South Korea	Wagga Wagga, Australia
116	Cassandra Kell	2002–2004	24	0	19 January 2002	South Korea	Bendigo, Australia	17 August 2004	Sweden	Volos, Greece
117	Olivia Hohnke	2002–2003	8	1	26 September 2002	Canada	Burnaby, Canada	7 April 2003	Cook Islands	Canberra, Australia
118	Tal Karp	2002–2004	27	2	26 September 2002	Canada	Burnaby, Canada	6 March 2004	Fiji	Ba, Fiji
119	Thea Slatyer	2002–2012	51	3	26 September 2002	Canada	Burnaby, Canada	11 July 2012	Japan	Tokyo, Japan
120	Melissa Barbieri	2002–2015	86	0	28 September 2002	Canada	Victoria, Canada	8 June 2015	United States	Winnipeg, Canada
121	Hayley Crawford	2003–2015	10	2	26 January 2003	South Korea	Canberra, Australia	10 February 2015	North Korea	Auckland, New Zealand
122	Pam Grant	2003–2004	12	0	29 January 2003	Mexico	Canberra, Australia	18 February 2004	New Zealand	Brisbane, Australia
123	Karla Reuter	2003–2010	49	0	28 August 2003	China	Jinan, China	23 May 2010	China	Chengdu, China
124	Lisa De Vanna	2004–2019	150	47	18 February 2004	New Zealand	Brisbane, Australia	18 June 2019	Jamaica	Grenoble, France
125	Sarah Walsh	2004–2012	70	32	18 February 2004	New Zealand	Brisbane, Australia	19 September 2012	United States	Denver, United States
126	Leah Blayney	2004–2006	16	0	18 February 2004	New Zealand	Brisbane, Australia	24 July 2006	Thailand	Adelaide, Australia
127	Kate Gill	2004–2015	86	41	18 February 2004	New Zealand	Brisbane, Australia	7 April 2015	Austria	Villach, Austria
128	Lana Harch	2004–2009	24	5	18 February 2004	New Zealand	Brisbane, Australia	7 February 2009	Italy	Canberra, Australia
129	Selin Kuralay	2004–2008	17	2	18 February 2004	New Zealand	Brisbane, Australia	27 April 2008	United States	Cary, United States
130	Kylie Ledbrook	2004–2011	19	1	2 July 2004	China	Beijing, China	12 May 2011	New Zealand	Gosford, Australia
131	Sally Shipard	2004–2011	59	4	2 July 2004	China	Beijing, China	3 September 2011	Thailand	Jinan, China
132	Collette McCallum	2005–2015	81	11	30 January 2005	China	Quanzhou, China	9 April 2015	Scotland	Falkirk, Scotland
133	Kim Carroll	2005–2014	55	2	30 January 2005	China	Quanzhou, China	16 May 2014	Jordan	Ho Chi Minh City, Vietnam
134	Caitlin Munoz	2005–2015	57	13	26 March 2005	Japan	Sydney, Australia	29 November 2015	South Korea	Incheon, South Korea
135	Jessica Mitchell	2005	3	0	29 March 2005	Japan	Sydney, Australia	28 July 2005	South Korea	Jeonju, South Korea
136	Emma Wirkus	2005–2007	7	0	29 March 2005	Japan	Sydney, Australia	16 August 2007	China	Tianjin, China
137	Joanne Burgess	2005–2008	40	5	29 March 2005	Japan	Sydney, Australia	24 July 2008	Japan	Kobe, Japan
138	Lydia Williams	2005–2024	104	0	28 July 2005	South Korea	Jeonju, South Korea	3 June 2024	China	Sydney, Australia
139	Lauren Colthorpe	2005–2011	51	7	3 December 2005	China	Sydney, Australia	3 July 2011	Equatorial Guinea	Bochum, Germany
140	Clare Polkinghorne	2006–2024	169	16	19 June 2006	China	Shanghai, China	7 December 2024	Chinese Taipei	Geelong, Australia
141	Sasha McDonnell	2006–2007	2	0	19 November 2006	Japan	Tokyo, Japan	23 February 2007	Uzbekistan	Taipei, Taiwan
142	Amber Neilson	2006–2009	14	0	19 November 2006	Japan	Tokyo, Japan	7 February 2009	Italy	Canberra, Australia
143	Jenna Tristram	2007–2008	9	5	7 April 2007	Hong Kong	Coffs Harbour, Australia	20 October 2008	Vietnam	Ho Chi Minh City, Vietnam
144	Ellen Beaumont	2007–2008	3	0	22 July 2007	New Zealand	Coffs Harbour, Australia	5 July 2008	China	Tianjin, China
145	Louisa Bisby	2007	1	0	22 July 2007	New Zealand	Coffs Harbour, Australia	22 July 2007	New Zealand	Coffs Harbour, Australia
146	Amy Chapman	2007–2013	20	4	22 July 2007	New Zealand	Coffs Harbour, Australia	6 July 2013	France	Angers, France
147	Victoria Balomenos	2007–2008	9	5	4 August 2007	Hong Kong	Mong Kok, Hong Kong	20 October 2008	Vietnam	Ho Chi Minh City, Vietnam
148	**Tameka Yallop**	2007–	136	14	4 August 2007	Hong Kong	Mong Kok, Hong Kong	2 December 2025	New Zealand	Adelaide, Australia
149	Caitlin Cooper	2007–2018	10	2	4 August 2007	Hong Kong	Mong Kok, Hong Kong	7 March 2018	Portugal	Albufeira, Portugal
150	Rachel Cooper	2007	1	0	4 August 2007	Hong Kong	Mong Kok, Hong Kong	4 August 2007	Hong Kong	Mong Kok, Hong Kong
151	Rachael Doyle	2007	1	0	4 August 2007	Hong Kong	Mong Kok, Hong Kong	4 August 2007	Hong Kong	Mong Kok, Hong Kong
152	Lyndsay Glohe	2007–2008	5	0	4 August 2007	Hong Kong	Mong Kok, Hong Kong	20 October 2008	Vietnam	Ho Chi Minh City, Vietnam
153	Elise Kellond-Knight	2007–2023	115	2	4 August 2007	Hong Kong	Mong Kok, Hong Kong	19 February 2023	Spain	Sydney, Australia
154	Ellyse Perry	2007–2012	18	3	4 August 2007	Hong Kong	Mong Kok, Hong Kong	27 January 2012	New Zealand	Wollongong, Australia
155	Teresa Polias	2007–2019	11	0	4 August 2007	Hong Kong	Mong Kok, Hong Kong	28 February 2019	New Zealand	Sydney, Australia
156	Renee Rollason	2007–2012	8	4	4 August 2007	Hong Kong	Mong Kok, Hong Kong	27 January 2012	New Zealand	Wollongong, Australia
157	Kyah Simon	2007–2023	111	29	4 August 2007	Hong Kong	Mong Kok, Hong Kong	12 April 2022	New Zealand	Canberra, Australia
158	Grace Gill	2007	1	0	4 August 2007	Hong Kong	Mong Kok, Hong Kong	4 August 2007	Hong Kong	Mong Kok, Hong Kong
159	Jenna Kingsley	2007	1	1	4 August 2007	Hong Kong	Mong Kok, Hong Kong	4 August 2007	Hong Kong	Mong Kok, Hong Kong
160	Brooke Spence	2008–2012	12	0	3 March 2008	New Zealand	Sunshine Coast, Australia	24 November 2012	China	Shenzhen, China
161	Ella Mastrantonio	2008–	7	1	8 June 2008	Japan	Ho Chi Minh City, Vietnam	13 April 2021	Netherlands	Nijmegen, Netherlands
162	Servet Uzunlar	2008–2015	48	2	5 July 2008	China	Tianjin, China	9 June 2015	United States	Winnipeg, Canada
163	Leena Khamis	2008–2015	25	5	5 July 2008	China	Tianjin, China	21 May 2015	Vietnam	Sydney, Australia
164	Ashleigh Sykes	2008–2016	19	5	9 October 2008	Thailand	Ho Chi Minh City, Vietnam	7 March 2016	North Korea	Osaka, Japan
165	Christine Walters	2008	4	0	11 October 2008	Philippines	Ho Chi Minh City, Vietnam	20 October 2008	Vietnam	Ho Chi Minh City, Vietnam
166	Danielle Brogan	2009–2015	7	0	31 January 2009	Italy	Sydney, Australia	10 February 2015	North Korea	Auckland, New Zealand
167	Ellie Brush	2009–2012	2	0	7 February 2009	Italy	Canberra, Australia	24 January 2012	New Zealand	Wollongong, Australia
168	**Sam Kerr**	2009–	143	76	7 February 2009	Italy	Canberra, Australia	13 October 2026	Haiti	Chambly, France
169	Aivi Luik	2010–2024	42	1	17 February 2010	New Zealand	Auckland, New Zealand	24 February 2024	Uzbekistan	Tashkent, Uzbekistan
170	**Michelle Heyman**	2010–2019, 2024–	87	33	3 March 2010	North Korea	Brisbane, Australia	13 March 2026	North Korea	Perth, Australia
171	Laura Brock	2010–2021	65	2	6 March 2010	North Korea	Brisbane, Australia	5 August 2021	United States	Kashima, Japan
172	**Emily van Egmond**	2010–	175	33	6 March 2010	North Korea	Brisbane, Australia	9 October 2026	Germany	Karlsruhe, Germany
173	Teigen Allen	2010–2019	40	0	19 May 2010	Vietnam	Chengdu, China	6 March 2019	Argentina	Melbourne, Australia
174	Catherine Cannuli	2011–2012	4	1	12 May 2011	New Zealand	Gosford, Australia	27 January 2012	New Zealand	Wollongong, Australia
175	**Caitlin Foord**	2011–	152	42	12 May 2011	New Zealand	Gosford, Australia	13 October 2026	Haiti	Chambly, France
176	Ashley Brown	2012	6	1	24 June 2012	New Zealand	Wollongong, Australia	19 September 2012	United States	Denver, United States
177	**Steph Catley**	2012–	149	7	24 June 2012	New Zealand	Wollongong, Australia	9 October 2026	Germany	Karlsruhe, Germany
178	**Alanna Kennedy**	2012–	152	18	24 June 2012	New Zealand	Wollongong, Australia	9 June 2026	Mexico	Sydney, Australia
179	**Hayley Raso**	2012–	112	24	24 June 2012	New Zealand	Wollongong, Australia	13 October 2026	Haiti	Chambly, France
180	Georgia Yeoman-Dale	2012–2017	5	0	24 June 2012	New Zealand	Wollongong, Australia	16 September 2017	Brazil	Carson, United States
181	Nicola Bolger	2012–2015	6	0	27 June 2012	New Zealand	Wollongong, Australia	9 March 2015	Finland	Larnaca, Cyprus
182	**Emily Gielnik**	2012–	63	13	11 July 2012	Japan	Tokyo, Japan	5 July 2025	Panama	Bunbury, Australia
183	**Katrina Gorry**	2012–	123	18	11 July 2012	Japan	Tokyo, Japan	21 March 2026	Japan	Sydney, Australia
184	Brianna Davey	2012–2015	18	0	13 September 2012	Haiti	Indianapolis, United States	9 April 2015	Scotland	Falkirk, Scotland
185	**Mackenzie Arnold**	2012–	71	0	20 November 2012	Chinese Taipei	Shenzhen, China	13 October 2026	Haiti	Chambly, France
186	Emma Checker	2012–	8	0	22 November 2012	Hong Kong	Shenzhen, China	21 September 2021	Republic of Ireland	Dublin, Republic of Ireland
187	Vedrana Popovic	2013	1	0	29 June 2013	Netherlands	IJmuiden, Netherlands	29 June 2013	Netherlands	IJmuiden, Netherlands
188	**Chloe Berryhill**	2013–	58	8	24 November 2013	China	Wollongong, Australia	8 July 2025	Panama	Perth, Australia
189	Hannah Brewer	2014–2018	3	0	10 March 2014	Scotland	Larnaca, Cyprus	7 March 2018	Portugal	Albufeira, Portugal
190	Gema Simon	2014–2019	11	0	10 March 2014	Scotland	Larnaca, Cyprus	6 March 2019	Argentina	Melbourne, Australia
191	Rhali Dobson	2014	1	0	9 April 2014	Brazil	Brisbane, Australia	9 April 2014	Brazil	Brisbane, Australia
192	Larissa Crummer	2015–2023	34	4	10 February 2015	North Korea	Auckland, New Zealand	7 April 2023	Scotland	London, England
193	Casey Dumont	2015–2016	3	0	12 February 2015	New Zealand	Auckland, New Zealand	23 July 2016	Brazil	Fortaleza, Brazil
194	Amy Harrison	2015–2019	13	0	12 February 2015	New Zealand	Auckland, New Zealand	12 November 2019	Chile	Adelaide, Australia
195	**Alex Chidiac**	2015–	41	3	12 February 2015	New Zealand	Auckland, New Zealand	13 October 2026	Haiti	Chambly, France
196	Tara Andrews	2015	2	0	25 October 2015	China	Chongqing, China	29 November 2015	South Korea	Incheon, South Korea
197	**Ellie Carpenter**	2016–	102	5	2 March 2016	Vietnam	Osaka, Japan	9 October 2026	Germany	Karlsruhe, Germany
198	Princess Ibini	2017–	8	1	27 July 2017	United States	Seattle, United States	28 June 2022	Portugal	Estoril, Portugal
199	Eliza Campbell	2017	2	0	22 November 2017	China	Melbourne, Australia	26 November 2017	China	Geelong, Australia
200	Emily Condon	2018	1	0	2 March 2018	Portugal	Algarve, Portugal	2 March 2018	Portugal	Algarve, Portugal
201	Rachel Lowe	2018	1	0	5 March 2018	China	Albufeira, Portugal	5 March 2018	China	Albufeira, Portugal
202	**Mary Fowler**	2018–	71	17	26 July 2018	Brazil	Kansas City, United States	9 June 2026	Mexico	Sydney, Australia
203	**Amy Sayer**	2018–	28	5	2 August 2018	Japan	Bridgeview, United States	9 October 2026	Germany	Karlsruhe, Germany
204	Karly Roestbakken	2019–	8	0	13 June 2019	Brazil	Montpellier, France	7 December 2024	Chinese Taipei	Geelong, Australia
205	Jenna McCormick	2019–2020	4	0	9 November 2019	Chile	Sydney, Australia	10 February 2020	Thailand	Sydney, Australia
206	Beattie Goad	2021	3	0	10 April 2021	Germany	Wiesbaden, Germany	10 June 2021	Denmark	Horsens, Denmark
207	Indiah-Paige Riley (Note: Also has been capped for New Zealand (2022―).)	2021	1	0	10 April 2021	Germany	Wiesbaden, Germany	10 April 2021	Germany	Wiesbaden, Germany
208	Alexandra Huynh	2021	1	0	10 April 2021	Germany	Wiesbaden, Germany	10 April 2021	Germany	Wiesbaden, Germany
209	Dylan Holmes	2021	1	0	13 April 2021	Netherlands	Nijmegen, Netherlands	13 April 2021	Netherlands	Nijmegen, Netherlands
210	**Kyra Cooney-Cross**	2021–	67	2	10 June 2021	Denmark	Horsens, Denmark	21 March 2026	Japan	Sydney, Australia
211	**Courtney Nevin**	2021–	47	1	10 June 2021	Denmark	Horsens, Denmark	13 October 2026	Haiti	Chambly, France
212	**Teagan Micah**	2021–	28	0	15 June 2021	Sweden	Kalmar, Sweden	2 December 2025	New Zealand	Adelaide, Australia
213	**Clare Wheeler**	2021–	44	4	21 September 2021	Republic of Ireland	Dublin, Republic of Ireland	13 October 2026	Haiti	Chambly, France
214	**Charli Grant**	2021–	40	2	21 September 2021	Republic of Ireland	Dublin, Republic of Ireland	13 October 2026	Haiti	Chambly, France
215	Angela Beard (Note: Also has been capped for the Philippines (2023―).)	2021–2022	3	0	21 September 2021	Republic of Ireland	Dublin, Republic of Ireland	27 November 2021	United States	Sydney, Australia
216	**Remy Siemsen**	2021–	20	0	23 October 2021	Brazil	Sydney, Australia	13 October 2026	Haiti	Chambly, France
217	**Bryleeh Henry**	2021–	6	1	23 October 2021	Brazil	Sydney, Australia	8 July 2025	Panama	Perth, Australia
218	**Jessika Nash**	2021–	4	0	27 November 2021	United States	Sydney, Australia	8 July 2025	Panama	Perth, Australia
219	**Holly McNamara**	2022–	22	4	21 January 2022	Indonesia	Mumbai, India	13 October 2026	Haiti	Chambly, France
220	**Cortnee Vine**	2022–	31	3	24 January 2022	Philippines	Mumbai, India	25 October 2025	Wales	Cardiff, Wales
221	**Jamilla Rankin**	2022–	11	0	25 June 2022	Spain	Huelva, Spain	13 October 2026	Haiti	Chambly, France
222	Taylor Ray	2022–	1	0	25 June 2022	Spain	Huelva, Spain	25 June 2022	Spain	Huelva, Spain
223	Matilda McNamara	2022	1	0	15 November 2022	Thailand	Gosford, Australia	15 November 2022	Thailand	Gosford, Australia
224	**Clare Hunt**	2023–	44	1	16 February 2023	Czech Republic	Gosford, Australia	17 March 2026	China	Perth, Australia
225	**Charlize Rule**	2023–	8	0	1 December 2023	Canada	Langford, Canada	9 June 2026	Mexico	Sydney, Australia
226	Sarah Hunter	2023–	1	0	1 December 2023	Canada	Langford, Canada	1 December 2023	Canada	Langford, Canada
227	**Kaitlyn Torpey**	2024–	31	2	24 February 2024	Uzbekistan	Tashkent, Uzbekistan	13 October 2026	Haiti	Chambly, France
228	**Sharn Freier**	2024–	9	2	9 April 2024	Mexico	San Antonio, United States	7 December 2024	Chinese Taipei	Geelong, Australia
229	**Daniela Galic**	2024–	6	1	25 October 2024	Switzerland	Zurich, Switzerland	13 October 2026	Haiti	Chambly, France
230	**Wini Heatley**	2024–	24	0	28 October 2024	Germany	Duisburg, Germany	13 October 2026	Haiti	Chambly, France
231	**Natasha Prior**	2024–	11	2	1 December 2024	Brazil	Gold Coast, Australia	5 July 2025	Panama	Bunbury, Australia
232	**Leah Davidson**	2024–	4	1	4 December 2024	Chinese Taipei	Melbourne, Australia	30 May 2025	Argentina	Melbourne, Australia
233	**Chloe Lincoln**	2024–	6	0	7 December 2024	Chinese Taipei	Geelong, Australia	13 October 2026	Haiti	Chambly, France
234	Laura Hughes (Note: Also has been capped for Wales (2025―).)	2024–2025	1	0	7 December 2024	Chinese Taipei	Geelong, Australia	7 December 2024	Chinese Taipei	Geelong, Australia
235	**Alana Murphy**	2025–	8	0	23 February 2025	United States	Glendale, United States	13 October 2026	Haiti	Chambly, France
236	Laini Freier	2025	1	0	23 February 2025	United States	Glendale, United States	23 February 2025	United States	Glendale, United States
237	**Kahli Johnson**	2025–	3	1	30 May 2025	Argentina	Melbourne, Australia	2 December 2025	New Zealand	Adelaide, Australia
238	**Isabel Gomez**	2025–	2	0	2 June 2025	Argentina	Canberra, Australia	15 April 2026	Kenya	Nairobi, Kenya
239	**Adriana Taranto**	2025–	2	0	5 July 2025	Panama	Bunbury, Australia	8 July 2025	Panama	Perth, Australia
240	**Jacynta Galabadaarachchi**	2025–	2	0	5 July 2025	Panama	Bunbury, Australia	8 July 2025	Panama	Perth, Australia
241	**Grace Kuilamu**	2025–	1	0	5 July 2025	Panama	Bunbury, Australia	5 July 2025	Panama	Bunbury, Australia
242	**Alexia Apostolakis**	2025–	2	0	5 July 2025	Panama	Bunbury, Australia	13 October 2026	Haiti	Chambly, France
243	**Leticia McKenna**	2026–	4	3	11 April 2026	Malawi	Nairobi, Kenya	13 October 2026	Haiti	Chambly, France
244	**Tori Tumeth**	2026–	2	0	9 October 2026	Germany	Karlsruhe, Germany	13 October 2026	Haiti	Chambly, France
