= List of FIFA Women's World Cup winning players =

List of footballers (soccer players) who have won the FIFA Women's World Cup

This is a list of all teams, players and managers who have won the FIFA Women's World Cup tournament since its inception in 1991.

== By team ==
The nine Women's World Cup tournaments have been won by five different nations. The United States has won the most titles with four. Spain is the current champion, winning the title in 2023. Back-to-back tournaments have been won on two occasions, first by Germany (2003, 2007) and most recently by USA (2015, 2019).

Nations that have won the Women's World Cup
Titles	Team	Year(s)
4	United States	1991, 1999, 2015, 2019
2	Germany	2003, 2007
1	Japan	2011
1	Norway	1995
1	Spain	2023

== By year ==
Participating teams have to register squads for the World Cup, which consisted of 18 players in 1991, 20 players from 1995, up to 21 in 2007, and 23 from 2015 onwards.

Squads of teams that have won the Women's World Cup
Year	Team	Manager	Squad	
Year	Team	Manager	#	Name
1991	United States (detailed squad)	Anson Dorrance	1	Mary Harvey
1991	United States (detailed squad)	Anson Dorrance	2	April Heinrichs
1991	United States (detailed squad)	Anson Dorrance	3	Shannon Higgins
1991	United States (detailed squad)	Anson Dorrance	4	Carla Werden
1991	United States (detailed squad)	Anson Dorrance	5	Lori Henry
1991	United States (detailed squad)	Anson Dorrance	6	Brandi Chastain
1991	United States (detailed squad)	Anson Dorrance	7	Tracey Bates
1991	United States (detailed squad)	Anson Dorrance	8	Linda Hamilton
1991	United States (detailed squad)	Anson Dorrance	9	Mia Hamm
1991	United States (detailed squad)	Anson Dorrance	10	Michelle Akers-Stahl
1991	United States (detailed squad)	Anson Dorrance	11	Julie Foudy
1991	United States (detailed squad)	Anson Dorrance	12	Carin Jennings
1991	United States (detailed squad)	Anson Dorrance	13	Kristine Lilly
1991	United States (detailed squad)	Anson Dorrance	14	Joy Biefeld
1991	United States (detailed squad)	Anson Dorrance	15	Wendy Gebauer
1991	United States (detailed squad)	Anson Dorrance	16	Debbie Belkin
1991	United States (detailed squad)	Anson Dorrance	17	Amy Allmann
1991	United States (detailed squad)	Anson Dorrance	18	Kim Maslin-Kammerdeiner
1995	Norway (detailed squad)	Even Pellerud	1	Bente Nordby
1995	Norway (detailed squad)	Even Pellerud	2	Tina Svensson
1995	Norway (detailed squad)	Even Pellerud	3	Gro Espeseth
1995	Norway (detailed squad)	Even Pellerud	4	Anne Nymark Andersen
1995	Norway (detailed squad)	Even Pellerud	5	Nina Nymark Andersen
1995	Norway (detailed squad)	Even Pellerud	6	Hege Riise
1995	Norway (detailed squad)	Even Pellerud	7	Tone Haugen
1995	Norway (detailed squad)	Even Pellerud	8	Heidi Støre
1995	Norway (detailed squad)	Even Pellerud	9	Kristin Sandberg
1995	Norway (detailed squad)	Even Pellerud	10	Linda Medalen
1995	Norway (detailed squad)	Even Pellerud	11	Ann Kristin Aarønes
1995	Norway (detailed squad)	Even Pellerud	12	Reidun Seth
1995	Norway (detailed squad)	Even Pellerud	13	Merete Myklebust
1995	Norway (detailed squad)	Even Pellerud	14	Hege Gunnerød
1995	Norway (detailed squad)	Even Pellerud	15	Randi Leinan
1995	Norway (detailed squad)	Even Pellerud	16	Marianne Pettersen
1995	Norway (detailed squad)	Even Pellerud	17	Anita Waage
1995	Norway (detailed squad)	Even Pellerud	18	Tone Gunn Frustøl
1995	Norway (detailed squad)	Even Pellerud	19	Agnete Carlsen
1995	Norway (detailed squad)	Even Pellerud	20	Ingrid Sternhoff
1999	United States (detailed squad)	Tony DiCicco	1	Briana Scurry
1999	United States (detailed squad)	Tony DiCicco	2	Lorrie Fair
1999	United States (detailed squad)	Tony DiCicco	3	Christie Pearce
1999	United States (detailed squad)	Tony DiCicco	4	Carla Overbeck
1999	United States (detailed squad)	Tony DiCicco	5	Tiffany Roberts
1999	United States (detailed squad)	Tony DiCicco	6	Brandi Chastain
1999	United States (detailed squad)	Tony DiCicco	7	Sara Whalen
1999	United States (detailed squad)	Tony DiCicco	8	Shannon MacMillan
1999	United States (detailed squad)	Tony DiCicco	9	Mia Hamm
1999	United States (detailed squad)	Tony DiCicco	10	Michelle Akers
1999	United States (detailed squad)	Tony DiCicco	11	Julie Foudy
1999	United States (detailed squad)	Tony DiCicco	12	Cindy Parlow
1999	United States (detailed squad)	Tony DiCicco	13	Kristine Lilly
1999	United States (detailed squad)	Tony DiCicco	14	Joy Fawcett
1999	United States (detailed squad)	Tony DiCicco	15	Tisha Venturini
1999	United States (detailed squad)	Tony DiCicco	16	Tiffeny Milbrett
1999	United States (detailed squad)	Tony DiCicco	17	Danielle Fotopoulos
1999	United States (detailed squad)	Tony DiCicco	18	Saskia Webber
1999	United States (detailed squad)	Tony DiCicco	19	Tracy Ducar
1999	United States (detailed squad)	Tony DiCicco	20	Kate Sobrero
2003	Germany (detailed squad)	Tina Theune-Meyer	1	Silke Rottenberg
2003	Germany (detailed squad)	Tina Theune-Meyer	2	Kerstin Stegemann
2003	Germany (detailed squad)	Tina Theune-Meyer	3	Linda Bresonik
2003	Germany (detailed squad)	Tina Theune-Meyer	4	Nia Künzer
2003	Germany (detailed squad)	Tina Theune-Meyer	5	Steffi Jones
2003	Germany (detailed squad)	Tina Theune-Meyer	6	Renate Lingor
2003	Germany (detailed squad)	Tina Theune-Meyer	7	Pia Wunderlich
2003	Germany (detailed squad)	Tina Theune-Meyer	8	Sandra Smisek
2003	Germany (detailed squad)	Tina Theune-Meyer	9	Birgit Prinz
2003	Germany (detailed squad)	Tina Theune-Meyer	10	Bettina Wiegmann
2003	Germany (detailed squad)	Tina Theune-Meyer	11	Martina Müller
2003	Germany (detailed squad)	Tina Theune-Meyer	12	Sonja Fuss
2003	Germany (detailed squad)	Tina Theune-Meyer	13	Sandra Minnert
2003	Germany (detailed squad)	Tina Theune-Meyer	14	Maren Meinert
2003	Germany (detailed squad)	Tina Theune-Meyer	15	Nadine Angerer
2003	Germany (detailed squad)	Tina Theune-Meyer	16	Viola Odebrecht
2003	Germany (detailed squad)	Tina Theune-Meyer	17	Ariane Hingst
2003	Germany (detailed squad)	Tina Theune-Meyer	18	Kerstin Garefrekes
2003	Germany (detailed squad)	Tina Theune-Meyer	19	Stefanie Gottschlich
2003	Germany (detailed squad)	Tina Theune-Meyer	20	Conny Pohlers
2007	Germany (detailed squad)	Silvia Neid	1	Nadine Angerer
2007	Germany (detailed squad)	Silvia Neid	2	Kerstin Stegemann
2007	Germany (detailed squad)	Silvia Neid	3	Saskia Bartusiak
2007	Germany (detailed squad)	Silvia Neid	4	Babett Peter
2007	Germany (detailed squad)	Silvia Neid	5	Annike Krahn
2007	Germany (detailed squad)	Silvia Neid	6	Linda Bresonik
2007	Germany (detailed squad)	Silvia Neid	7	Melanie Behringer
2007	Germany (detailed squad)	Silvia Neid	8	Sandra Smisek
2007	Germany (detailed squad)	Silvia Neid	9	Birgit Prinz
2007	Germany (detailed squad)	Silvia Neid	10	Renate Lingor
2007	Germany (detailed squad)	Silvia Neid	11	Anja Mittag
2007	Germany (detailed squad)	Silvia Neid	12	Ursula Holl
2007	Germany (detailed squad)	Silvia Neid	13	Sandra Minnert
2007	Germany (detailed squad)	Silvia Neid	14	Simone Laudehr
2007	Germany (detailed squad)	Silvia Neid	15	Sonja Fuss
2007	Germany (detailed squad)	Silvia Neid	16	Martina Müller
2007	Germany (detailed squad)	Silvia Neid	17	Ariane Hingst
2007	Germany (detailed squad)	Silvia Neid	18	Kerstin Garefrekes
2007	Germany (detailed squad)	Silvia Neid	19	Fatmire Bajramaj
2007	Germany (detailed squad)	Silvia Neid	20	Petra Wimbersky
2007	Germany (detailed squad)	Silvia Neid	21	Silke Rottenberg
2011	Japan (detailed squad)	Norio Sasaki	1	Nozomi Yamago
2011	Japan (detailed squad)	Norio Sasaki	2	Yukari Kinga
2011	Japan (detailed squad)	Norio Sasaki	3	Azusa Iwashimizu
2011	Japan (detailed squad)	Norio Sasaki	4	Saki Kumagai
2011	Japan (detailed squad)	Norio Sasaki	5	Kyoko Yano
2011	Japan (detailed squad)	Norio Sasaki	6	Mizuho Sakaguchi
2011	Japan (detailed squad)	Norio Sasaki	7	Kozue Ando
2011	Japan (detailed squad)	Norio Sasaki	8	Aya Miyama
2011	Japan (detailed squad)	Norio Sasaki	9	Nahomi Kawasumi
2011	Japan (detailed squad)	Norio Sasaki	10	Homare Sawa
2011	Japan (detailed squad)	Norio Sasaki	11	Shinobu Ohno
2011	Japan (detailed squad)	Norio Sasaki	12	Miho Fukumoto
2011	Japan (detailed squad)	Norio Sasaki	13	Rumi Utsugi
2011	Japan (detailed squad)	Norio Sasaki	14	Megumi Kamionobe
2011	Japan (detailed squad)	Norio Sasaki	15	Aya Sameshima
2011	Japan (detailed squad)	Norio Sasaki	16	Asuna Tanaka
2011	Japan (detailed squad)	Norio Sasaki	17	Yūki Nagasato
2011	Japan (detailed squad)	Norio Sasaki	18	Karina Maruyama
2011	Japan (detailed squad)	Norio Sasaki	19	Megumi Takase
2011	Japan (detailed squad)	Norio Sasaki	20	Mana Iwabuchi
2011	Japan (detailed squad)	Norio Sasaki	21	Ayumi Kaihori
2015	United States (detailed squad)	Jill Ellis	1	Hope Solo
2015	United States (detailed squad)	Jill Ellis	2	Sydney Leroux
2015	United States (detailed squad)	Jill Ellis	3	Christie Rampone
2015	United States (detailed squad)	Jill Ellis	4	Becky Sauerbrunn
2015	United States (detailed squad)	Jill Ellis	5	Kelley O'Hara
2015	United States (detailed squad)	Jill Ellis	6	Whitney Engen
2015	United States (detailed squad)	Jill Ellis	7	Shannon Boxx
2015	United States (detailed squad)	Jill Ellis	8	Amy Rodriguez
2015	United States (detailed squad)	Jill Ellis	9	Heather O'Reilly
2015	United States (detailed squad)	Jill Ellis	10	Carli Lloyd
2015	United States (detailed squad)	Jill Ellis	11	Ali Krieger
2015	United States (detailed squad)	Jill Ellis	12	Lauren Holiday
2015	United States (detailed squad)	Jill Ellis	13	Alex Morgan
2015	United States (detailed squad)	Jill Ellis	14	Morgan Brian
2015	United States (detailed squad)	Jill Ellis	15	Megan Rapinoe
2015	United States (detailed squad)	Jill Ellis	16	Lori Chalupny
2015	United States (detailed squad)	Jill Ellis	17	Tobin Heath
2015	United States (detailed squad)	Jill Ellis	18	Ashlyn Harris
2015	United States (detailed squad)	Jill Ellis	19	Julie Johnston
2015	United States (detailed squad)	Jill Ellis	20	Abby Wambach
2015	United States (detailed squad)	Jill Ellis	21	Alyssa Naeher
2015	United States (detailed squad)	Jill Ellis	22	Meghan Klingenberg
2015	United States (detailed squad)	Jill Ellis	23	Christen Press
2019	United States (detailed squad)	Jill Ellis	1	Alyssa Naeher
2019	United States (detailed squad)	Jill Ellis	2	Mallory Pugh
2019	United States (detailed squad)	Jill Ellis	3	Sam Mewis
2019	United States (detailed squad)	Jill Ellis	4	Becky Sauerbrunn
2019	United States (detailed squad)	Jill Ellis	5	Kelley O'Hara
2019	United States (detailed squad)	Jill Ellis	6	Morgan Brian
2019	United States (detailed squad)	Jill Ellis	7	Abby Dahlkemper
2019	United States (detailed squad)	Jill Ellis	8	Julie Ertz
2019	United States (detailed squad)	Jill Ellis	9	Lindsey Horan
2019	United States (detailed squad)	Jill Ellis	10	Carli Lloyd
2019	United States (detailed squad)	Jill Ellis	11	Ali Krieger
2019	United States (detailed squad)	Jill Ellis	12	Tierna Davidson
2019	United States (detailed squad)	Jill Ellis	13	Alex Morgan
2019	United States (detailed squad)	Jill Ellis	14	Emily Sonnett
2019	United States (detailed squad)	Jill Ellis	15	Megan Rapinoe
2019	United States (detailed squad)	Jill Ellis	16	Rose Lavelle
2019	United States (detailed squad)	Jill Ellis	17	Tobin Heath
2019	United States (detailed squad)	Jill Ellis	18	Ashlyn Harris
2019	United States (detailed squad)	Jill Ellis	19	Crystal Dunn
2019	United States (detailed squad)	Jill Ellis	20	Allie Long
2019	United States (detailed squad)	Jill Ellis	21	Adrianna Franch
2019	United States (detailed squad)	Jill Ellis	22	Jessica McDonald
2019	United States (detailed squad)	Jill Ellis	23	Christen Press
2023	Spain (detailed squad)	Jorge Vilda	1	Misa Rodríguez
2023	Spain (detailed squad)	Jorge Vilda	2	Ona Batlle
2023	Spain (detailed squad)	Jorge Vilda	3	Teresa Abelleira
2023	Spain (detailed squad)	Jorge Vilda	4	Irene Paredes
2023	Spain (detailed squad)	Jorge Vilda	5	Ivana Andrés
2023	Spain (detailed squad)	Jorge Vilda	6	Aitana Bonmatí
2023	Spain (detailed squad)	Jorge Vilda	7	Irene Guerrero
2023	Spain (detailed squad)	Jorge Vilda	8	Mariona Caldentey
2023	Spain (detailed squad)	Jorge Vilda	9	Esther González
2023	Spain (detailed squad)	Jorge Vilda	10	Jennifer Hermoso
2023	Spain (detailed squad)	Jorge Vilda	11	Alexia Putellas
2023	Spain (detailed squad)	Jorge Vilda	12	Oihane Hernández
2023	Spain (detailed squad)	Jorge Vilda	13	Enith Salón
2023	Spain (detailed squad)	Jorge Vilda	14	Laia Codina
2023	Spain (detailed squad)	Jorge Vilda	15	Eva Navarro
2023	Spain (detailed squad)	Jorge Vilda	16	María Pérez
2023	Spain (detailed squad)	Jorge Vilda	17	Alba Redondo
2023	Spain (detailed squad)	Jorge Vilda	18	Salma Paralluelo
2023	Spain (detailed squad)	Jorge Vilda	19	Olga Carmona
2023	Spain (detailed squad)	Jorge Vilda	20	Rocío Gálvez
2023	Spain (detailed squad)	Jorge Vilda	21	Claudia Zornoza
2023	Spain (detailed squad)	Jorge Vilda	22	Athenea del Castillo
2023	Spain (detailed squad)	Jorge Vilda	23	Cata Coll

== By player ==
A total of 157 players have been in the winning team in the Women's World Cup. 32 players have won the tournament twice.

Players who have won the Women's World Cup
T	Player	Team	Year(s) won
2	Brandi Chastain	United States	1991, 1999
2	Mia Hamm	United States	1991, 1999
2	Michelle Akers	United States	1991, 1999
2	Kristine Lilly	United States	1991, 1999
2	Julie Foudy	United States	1991, 1999
2	Carla Overbeck	United States	1991, 1999
2	Joy Fawcett	United States	1991, 1999
2	Nadine Angerer	Germany	2003, 2007
2	Kerstin Stegemann	Germany	2003, 2007
2	Linda Bresonik	Germany	2003, 2007
2	Sandra Smisek	Germany	2003, 2007
2	Birgit Prinz	Germany	2003, 2007
2	Renate Lingor	Germany	2003, 2007
2	Sandra Minnert	Germany	2003, 2007
2	Sonja Fuss	Germany	2003, 2007
2	Ariane Hingst	Germany	2003, 2007
2	Kerstin Garefrekes	Germany	2003, 2007
2	Silke Rottenberg	Germany	2003, 2007
2	Martina Müller	Germany	2003, 2007
2	Christie Pearce	United States	1999, 2015
2	Alyssa Naeher	United States	2015, 2019
2	Becky Sauerbrunn	United States	2015, 2019
2	Kelley O'Hara	United States	2015, 2019
2	Morgan Brian	United States	2015, 2019
2	Carli Lloyd	United States	2015, 2019
2	Ali Krieger	United States	2015, 2019
2	Alex Morgan	United States	2015, 2019
2	Megan Rapinoe	United States	2015, 2019
2	Tobin Heath	United States	2015, 2019
2	Ashlyn Harris	United States	2015, 2019
2	Christen Press	United States	2015, 2019
2	Julie Ertz	United States	2015, 2019
1	Mary Harvey	United States	1991
1	April Heinrichs	United States	1991
1	Shannon Higgins	United States	1991
1	Lori Henry	United States	1991
1	Tracey Bates	United States	1991
1	Linda Hamilton	United States	1991
1	Carin Jennings	United States	1991
1	Wendy Gebauer	United States	1991
1	Debbie Belkin	United States	1991
1	Amy Allmann	United States	1991
1	Kim Maslin-Kammerdeiner	United States	1991
1	Bente Nordby	Norway	1995
1	Tina Svensson	Norway	1995
1	Gro Espeseth	Norway	1995
1	Anne Nymark Andersen	Norway	1995
1	Nina Nymark Andersen	Norway	1995
1	Hege Riise	Norway	1995
1	Tone Haugen	Norway	1995
1	Heidi Støre	Norway	1995
1	Kristin Sandberg	Norway	1995
1	Linda Medalen	Norway	1995
1	Ann Kristin Aarønes	Norway	1995
1	Reidun Seth	Norway	1995
1	Merete Myklebust	Norway	1995
1	Hege Gunnerød	Norway	1995
1	Randi Leinan	Norway	1995
1	Marianne Pettersen	Norway	1995
1	Anita Waage	Norway	1995
1	Tone Gunn Frustøl	Norway	1995
1	Agnete Carlsen	Norway	1995
1	Ingrid Sternhoff	Norway	1995
1	Briana Scurry	United States	1999
1	Lorrie Fair	United States	1999
1	Tiffany Roberts	United States	1999
1	Sara Whalen	United States	1999
1	Shannon MacMillan	United States	1999
1	Cindy Parlow	United States	1999
1	Tisha Venturini	United States	1999
1	Tiffeny Milbrett	United States	1999
1	Danielle Fotopoulos	United States	1999
1	Saskia Webber	United States	1999
1	Tracy Ducar	United States	1999
1	Kate Sobrero	United States	1999
1	Nia Künzer	Germany	2003
1	Steffi Jones	Germany	2003
1	Pia Wunderlich	Germany	2003
1	Bettina Wiegmann	Germany	2003
1	Maren Meinert	Germany	2003
1	Viola Odebrecht	Germany	2003
1	Stefanie Gottschlich	Germany	2003
1	Conny Pohlers	Germany	2003
1	Saskia Bartusiak	Germany	2007
1	Babett Peter	Germany	2007
1	Annike Krahn	Germany	2007
1	Melanie Behringer	Germany	2007
1	Anja Mittag	Germany	2007
1	Ursula Holl	Germany	2007
1	Simone Laudehr	Germany	2007
1	Fatmire Bajramaj	Germany	2007
1	Petra Wimbersky	Germany	2007
1	Nozomi Yamago	Japan	2011
1	Yukari Kinga	Japan	2011
1	Azusa Iwashimizu	Japan	2011
1	Saki Kumagai	Japan	2011
1	Kyoko Yano	Japan	2011
1	Mizuho Sakaguchi	Japan	2011
1	Kozue Ando	Japan	2011
1	Aya Miyama	Japan	2011
1	Nahomi Kawasumi	Japan	2011
1	Homare Sawa	Japan	2011
1	Shinobu Ohno	Japan	2011
1	Miho Fukumoto	Japan	2011
1	Rumi Utsugi	Japan	2011
1	Megumi Kamionobe	Japan	2011
1	Aya Sameshima	Japan	2011
1	Asuna Tanaka	Japan	2011
1	Yūki Nagasato	Japan	2011
1	Karina Maruyama	Japan	2011
1	Megumi Takase	Japan	2011
1	Mana Iwabuchi	Japan	2011
1	Ayumi Kaihori	Japan	2011
1	Hope Solo	United States	2015
1	Sydney Leroux	United States	2015
1	Whitney Engen	United States	2015
1	Shannon Boxx	United States	2015
1	Amy Rodriguez	United States	2015
1	Heather O'Reilly	United States	2015
1	Lauren Holiday	United States	2015
1	Lori Chalupny	United States	2015
1	Abby Wambach	United States	2015
1	Meghan Klingenberg	United States	2015
1	Mallory Pugh	United States	2019
1	Sam Mewis	United States	2019
1	Abby Dahlkemper	United States	2019
1	Lindsey Horan	United States	2019
1	Tierna Davidson	United States	2019
1	Emily Sonnett	United States	2019
1	Rose Lavelle	United States	2019
1	Crystal Dunn	United States	2019
1	Allie Long	United States	2019
1	Adrianna Franch	United States	2019
1	Jessica McDonald	United States	2019
1	Misa Rodríguez	Spain	2023
1	Ona Batlle	Spain	2023
1	Teresa Abelleira	Spain	2023
1	Irene Paredes	Spain	2023
1	Ivana Andrés	Spain	2023
1	Aitana Bonmatí	Spain	2023
1	Irene Guerrero	Spain	2023
1	Mariona Caldentey	Spain	2023
1	Esther González	Spain	2023
1	Jennifer Hermoso	Spain	2023
1	Alexia Putellas	Spain	2023
1	Oihane Hernández	Spain	2023
1	Enith Salón	Spain	2023
1	Laia Codina	Spain	2023
1	Eva Navarro	Spain	2023
1	María Pérez	Spain	2023
1	Alba Redondo	Spain	2023
1	Salma Paralluelo	Spain	2023
1	Olga Carmona	Spain	2023
1	Rocío Gálvez	Spain	2023
1	Claudia Zornoza	Spain	2023
1	Athenea del Castillo	Spain	2023
1	Cata Coll	Spain	2023

== By manager ==
There have been a total of 8 managers win the Women's World Cup. Jill Ellis is the only manager to win two Women's World Cups. Ellis (Portsmouth, England), along with Anson Dorrance (Bombay, India) are the only managers not born in the country they won the Women's World Cup, however both hold United States nationality.

Silvia Neid was assistant manager to Tina Theune for Germany's 2003 tournament win before lifting the 2007 trophy as manager.

Managers who have won the Women's World Cup
T	Manager	Team	Year(s)
2	Jill Ellis	United States	2015, 2019
1	Anson Dorrance	United States	1991
1	Even Pellerud	Norway	1995
1	Tony DiCicco	United States	1999
1	Tina Theune-Meyer	Germany	2003
1	Silvia Neid	Germany	2007
1	Norio Sasaki	Japan	2011
1	Jorge Vilda	Spain	2023
