= Éliane =

Éliane is a French feminine given name, sometimes written Eliane, and also used as a surname.

== Given name ==
People with the given name include:

- Eliane (footballer) (Eliane Perreira da Silva; born 1971), Brazilian footballer
- Éliane Amado Levy-Valensi (1919–2006), French-Israeli psychologist
- Éliane Assassi (1958), member of the Senate of France
- Éliane Basse (1899 – 1985), French paleontologist
- Eliane Becks Nininahazwe, Burundian musician and HIV/AIDS activist
- Eliane Chappuis (1978), American actress of Swiss-French and Vietnamese descent
- Eliane Christen (born 1999), Swiss skier
- Éliane Droubry (1987), Côte d'Ivoirian swimmer
- Éliane Duthoit (1946), French United Nations official
- Eliane Elias (1960), Brazilian jazz pianist and singer
- Éliane Gubin (1942), Belgian historian, researcher and professor
- Éliane Jacq (1948–2011), French athlete
- Éliane Jeannin-Garreau (1911–1999), French resistance agent
- Eliane Karp (1953), French-born wife of Peru's former president, anthropologist
- Éliane Amado Levy-Valensi (1919–2006), French-Israeli psychologist
- Éliane de Meuse (1899–1993), Belgian painter
- Eliane Plewman (born Éliane Browne-Bartroli) (1917–1944), French SOE agent
- Éliane Radigue (1932–2026), French electronic music and classical composer
- Éliane Reyes (1977), Belgian pianist
- Eliane Umuhire (born 1986), Rwandan-French actress

== Surname ==
- Pierre Éliane
