= Garreau =

Garreau is a French surname. Notable people with the surname include:

- Georges Garreau (1902–1986), French diver at the 1924 Olympics
- Joel Garreau (born 1948), American journalist and writer
- Lazare Garreau (1812 – 1892), French plant physiologist
- Ludovic Garreau (born 1983), French ice hockey coach and former player

== See also ==
- Éliane Jeannin-Garreau (1911–1999), French Resistance member
