= 1995 Algarve Cup =

International women's football tournament

Tournament details
- Host country: Portugal
- Teams: 8 (from 2 confederations)
- Venue(s): 8

Final positions
- Champions: Sweden (1st title)
- Runners-up: Denmark
- Third place: Norway

Tournament statistics
- Matches played: 16
- Goals scored: 51 (3.19 per match)
- Best player(s): (Denmark) Helle Jensen

The 1995 Algarve Cup was the second edition of the Algarve Cup, an invitational women's association football tournament. It took place between 14 and 19 March 1995 in Portugal with Sweden winning the event defeating Denmark, 1-0, in the final game. Norway ended up third defeating the USA, 7-5 following penalty shootout, in the third prize-game.

== Format ==
The number of invited countries was increased from six to eight with Italy and the Netherlands appearing in their first Algarve Cup tournament.

The eight invited teams were split into two groups that played a round-robin tournament. On completion of this, the fourth placed teams in each group played each other to determine seventh and eighth place, the third placed teams in each group played each other to decide fifth and sixth place, the second placed teams in each group played to determine third and fourth place and the winners of each group would compete for first and second place overall.

Points awarded in the group stage followed the standard formula of three points for a win, one point for a draw and zero points for a loss.

== Group A ==
Team	Pts	Pld	W	D	L	GF	GA	GD
Sweden	6	3	2	0	1	6	3	+3
Norway	6	3	2	0	1	5	2	+3
Netherlands	3	3	1	0	2	2	4	−2
Italy	3	3	1	0	2	3	7	−4

March 14, 1995

Sweden	4–0	Italy
Videkull 45+6', 87'; Zeikfalvy 62'; Andersson 90'	SvFF Report (in Swedish)

Lagos

March 14, 1995

Norway	0–1	Netherlands
		Keereweer

Silves

March 16, 1995

Norway	3–1	Italy
Waage; Medalen; Aarønes		Fiorini

Quarteira

March 16, 1995

Sweden	2–1	Netherlands
Andersson 39'; Andelén 87'	SvFF Report (in Swedish)	Pauw 56'

Olhão

March 17, 1995

Netherlands	0–2	Italy
		Baldelli; Guarino

Vila Real de Santo António

March 17, 1995

Sweden	0–2	Norway
	SvFF Report (in Swedish)	Medalen 14'; Riise 59'

Portimão

== Group B ==
Team	Pts	Pld	W	D	L	GF	GA	GD
Denmark	9	3	3	0	0	10	0	+10
United States	6	3	2	0	1	5	2	+3
Finland	3	3	1	0	2	2	5	−3
Portugal	0	3	0	0	3	0	10	−10

March 14, 1995

Denmark	5–0	Portugal
Krogh; Jensen; Madsen; Pedersen

Faro

March 14, 1995

United States	2–0	Finland
Lilly; Hamm

Faro

March 16, 1995

United States	3–0	Portugal
Milbrett; Gabarra

Portimão

March 16, 1995

Denmark	3–0	Finland
Christensen; Kolding; Jensen

Silves

March 17, 1995

Denmark	2–0	United States
Jensen; Nielsen

Lagos

March 17, 1995

Finland	2–0	Portugal
Mäkinen; Heikari

Olhão

== Seventh Place ==
March 19, 1995

Italy	4–1	Portugal
Carta 26'; Baldelli 34'; Guarino 89'; Morace 90'		Sequeira

Lagos

Hosts Portugal again appeared in the play-off for last place, facing newcomers Italy and being defeated 4–1 with two of the Italians' goals being scored in the final two minutes of play.

== Fifth Place ==
March 19, 1995

Finland	1–1 asdet (3–4) (PSO)	Netherlands
Mäkinen (7)		Kormacher

Portimão

The Netherlands finished in sixth place on their first appearance at the Algarve Cup, losing to the 1994 sixth placed team Finland in a penalty shootout.

== Third Place ==
March 19, 1995

Norway	3–3 asdet (4–2) (PSO)	United States
Sandberg 26'; A. Nymark Andersen 51' (pen.); Myklebust 87' (pen.)		Akers 21'; Gabarra 28'; Foudy 55'

Quarteira

For the second year running, Norway faced the United States in their last game of the tournament. With the score at 3–3 after full-time, a period of sudden death extra-time was played that failed to see another goal. Norway won the following penalty shootout 4–2 to finish third overall in the final tournament standings.

== Final ==
March 19, 1995

Sweden	3–2 Aet	Denmark
Olsson 36'; Andelén 53'; Nessvold 117'	SvFF Report (in Swedish)	Jensen 22', 78'

Loulé

Sweden had played Denmark in the previous year's competition to decide third place and defeated them again on this occasion to finish as overall winners of the tournament.

== Awards ==
1995 Algarve Cup

Sweden
First title

Best player
(Denmark) Helle Jensen
