= 1994 Algarve Cup =

International women's football tournament

Tournament details
- Host country: Portugal
- Teams: 6 (from 2 confederations)
- Venue: 7

Final positions
- Champions: Norway (1st title)
- Runners-up: United States
- Third place: Sweden

Tournament statistics
- Matches played: 9
- Goals scored: 27 (3 per match)
- Top scorer(s): (Norway) Ann Kristin Aarønes (5 goals)
- Best player: (Norway) Ann Kristin Aarønes

The 1994 Algarve Cup was the inaugural edition of the Algarve Cup, an invitational women's association football tournament. It took place between 16 and 20 March 1994 in Portugal with Norway winning the event, defeating the USA, 1–0 in the final game. Sweden ended up third defeating Denmark, 1–0, in the game for third prize.

== Format ==
The inaugural competition was contested between the hosts Portugal, four Scandinavian teams (Denmark, Finland, Norway and Sweden) and the USA. Only two confederations were thus represented, CONCACAF and UEFA.

The six invited teams were split into two groups that played a round-robin tournament. On completion of this, the third placed teams in each group would play each other to decide fifth and sixth place, the second placed teams in each group would play to determine third and fourth place and the winners of each group would compete for first and second place overall.

Points awarded in the group stage followed the standard formula of three points for a win, one point for a draw and zero points for a loss.

- All times WET (UTC±00:00).

== Group A ==
Team	Pts	Pld	W	D	L	GF	GA	GD
United States	6	2	2	0	0	6	0	+6
Sweden	3	2	1	0	1	3	1	+2
Portugal	0	2	0	0	2	0	8	−8

16 March 1994
16:30

United States	5–0	Portugal
Gabarra 5', 31'; Lilly 21'; Milbrett 85'; Foudy 89'

Estádio Dr. Francisco Vieira, Silves
Attendance: 2,000
Referee: Finn Lambek (Denmark)

17 March 1994
16:30

Sweden	3–0	Portugal
Nilsson 11'; Cazuza 25' (o.g.); Nessvold 76'

Estádio José Arcanjo, Olhão
Attendance: 500
Referee: Mika Peltola (Finland)

18 March 1994

United States	1–0	Sweden
Hamm 1'

Vila Real de Santo António
Attendance: 450

1991 FIFA Women's World Cup winners; the United States, finished in the top position of Group A with maximum points after winning both of their games including defeating the hosts Portugal 5–0.

== Group B ==
Team	Pts	Pld	W	D	L	GF	GA	GD
Norway	6	2	2	0	0	12	1	+11
Denmark	3	2	1	0	1	2	6	−4
Finland	0	2	0	0	2	0	7	−7

16 March 1994

Norway	6–0	Finland
Hegstad 1'; Aarønes 4', 33'; Krokan 52'; Sandberg 85' ? (o.g.)

Portimão
Attendance: 462

17 March 1994

Denmark	1–0	Finland
Rasmussen 1'

Estádio José Arcanjo, Olhão

18 March 1994

Norway	6–1	Denmark
Aarønes 9', 57'; Riise 14'; Medaln 17'; Hegstad 38'; Carlsen 60'		Hansen 1'

Vila Real de Santo António
Attendance: 436

Norway, 1991 World Cup runner's up, defeated their neighbours Denmark and Finland by scoring six goals in each match.

== Fifth Place ==
20 March 1994
10:00

Portugal	2–0	Finland
Couto 55'; Sequeira 68'

Estádio Municipal de Quarteira, Quarteira
Referee: Finn Lambek (Denmark)

== Third Place ==
20 March 1994

Sweden	1–0	Denmark
Videkull 1'

Loulé
Attendance: 400

== Final ==
20 March 1994

Norway	1–0	United States
Aarønes 84'

Estádio de São Luís, Faro
Attendance: 1,152
Referee: José Pratas (Portugal)

In a replay of the 1991 FIFA Women's World Cup Final, Norway once again faced the USA but won on this occasion.

== Awards ==
1994 Algarve Cup

Norway
First title

Best player
(Norway) Ann Kristin Aarønes

== Goalscorers ==
5 goals

- (Norway) Ann Kristin Aarønes

2 goals

- (Norway) Birthe Hegstad
- (United States) Carin Gabarra

1 goal

- (Denmark) Christina Hansen
- (Denmark) Janne Rasmussen
- (Norway) Agnete Carlsen
- (Norway) Elin Krokan
- (Norway) Linda Medalen
- (Norway) Hege Riise
- (Norway) Kristin Sandberg
- (Portugal) Carla Couto
- (Portugal) Patrícia Sequeira
- (Sweden) Annika Nessvold
- (Sweden) Helen Nilsson
- (Sweden) Lena Videkull
- (United States) Julie Foudy
- (United States) Mia Hamm
- (United States) Kristine Lilly
- (United States) Tiffeny Milbrett

Own goal

- (Finland) ? (against Norway)
- (Portugal) Anabela Cazuza (against Sweden)
