= Trimboli =

Trimboli is a surname. Notable people with the surname include:

- Antoni Trimboli (born 1996), Australian footballer
- Leanne Trimboli (born 1975), Australian soccer goalkeeper
- Paul Trimboli (born 1969), Australian footballer
- Simone Trimboli (born 2002), Italian footballer
