= Li Ying =

Li Ying may refer to:

- Li Ying (Eastern Han) (died 169), Confucian scholar and official during the Han dynasty
- Li Ying (prince) (died 737), crown prince of the Tang dynasty
- Li Ying (Water Margin), a fictional character in the Water Margin
- Li Ying (footballer, born 1973), Chinese women's association football player
- Li Ying (artist) (born 1992), Chinese artist and owner of the Twitter account Teacher Li Is Not Your Teacher
- Li Ying (footballer, born 1993), Chinese women's association football player
- Li Ying College, a school in Hong Kong
- Ying Li (Marvel Cinematic Universe), a fictional character

== Female Chinese volleyball players ==
- Li Ying (volleyball, born 1979) 李颖, player for Bayi Volleyball
- Li Ying (volleyball, born 1980) 李颖, beach volleyball player who finished top 6 at the 2005 Beach Volleyball World Championships
- Li Ying (volleyball, born 1988) 李莹, player for Tianjin Volleyball
- Li Ying (volleyball, born 1995) 李莹, player for Zhejiang women's volleyball team
