= Eliane =

Éliane is a French feminine given name, also used as a surname.

Eliane or Éliane may also refer to:

- 1329 Eliane, a Main-belt Asteroid discovered on March 23, 1933
- Éliane, the name for Hill A1 in the 1954 battle of Dien Bien Phu taken by Colonel General Nguyễn Hữu An
