= Moncef Chelli =

- Born: February 11, 1936; Tunis, Tunisia
- Died: March 18, 1994 (aged 58); Paris, France
- Occupations: Philosopher and writer

Moncef Chelli (Arabic: منصف شيلي), (11 February 1936 in Tunis – 18 March 1994 in Paris), was a Franco-Tunisian philosopher and writer.

== Biography ==
He arrived in France after completing secondary school at Sadiki College in Tunis to begin higher studies in philosophy at the Sorbonne, as well as Arabic and mathematics. He was awarded the rank of docteur d'État of letters and humanities in 1979.

He was fluent in six languages (French, English, Spanish, Arabic, Latin and Ancient Greek) and equally competent at mathematics, geometry and studying the theory of relativity which strongly inspired his philosophical writings. He produced, notably, a translation of René Descartes' Rules for the Direction of the Mind into Arabic for UNESCO. In 1983 he presided over a seminar of the world congress for philosophy in Montreal, Quebec, Canada.

He was the author of numerous books. His chief and final work, Le Mythe de cristal, published posthumously, dealt with the theory of cultural relativity, on which he had worked all his life, and attempted to explain the reasons for the contemporary supremacy of the West and the reasons for its confrontation with the East.

== Books ==
- La Parole arabe (The Arabic Language), éd. Sindbad, Paris, 1980
- L'Évolution des idées dans la culture occidentale (The Evolution of Ideas in Western Culture), éd. Ellipses Marketing, Paris, 1987 ISBN 2729887148
- Trois visions du temps (Three Visions of the Times), with Éliane Amado Lévy-Valensi & Claude-Roland Souchet. Éditions du Centurion, Paris, 1993
- Le Mythe de cristal ou le secret de la puissance de l'Occident (The Myth of the Crystal or the Secret of the Power of the West), éd. Les Empêcheurs de penser en rond, Paris, 1997 ISBN 2908602954
