= 1991 CONCACAF Women's Championship =

Coupe des nations féminine de la CONCACAF 1991

Tournament details
- Host country: Haiti
- Dates: 16–28 April
- Teams: 8 (from 1 confederation)
- Venue: 1 (in 1 host city)

Final positions
- Champions: United States (1st title)
- Runners-up: Canada
- Third place: Trinidad and Tobago
- Fourth place: Haiti

Tournament statistics
- Matches played: 16
- Goals scored: 101 (6.31 per match)

The 1991 CONCACAF Women's Championship was the inaugural edition of the CONCACAF Women's Championship, the international women's association football tournament for North American, Central American and Caribbean nations organized by CONCACAF. The tournament took place in Port-au-Prince, Haiti, between 18 and 27 April 1991 and consisted of eight national teams. The matches lasted 80 minutes long.

The United States won the tournament after defeating Canada 5–0 in the final match. They became CONCACAF's single qualifier for the 1991 FIFA Women's World Cup, which was hosted by China in November and ended with a U.S. victory.

== Participating teams ==
- From the North American Zone:

Canada
Mexico
United States

- From the Central American Zone:

Costa Rica

- From the Caribbean Zone:

Haiti (hosts)
Jamaica
Martinique
Trinidad and Tobago

== Venues ==
Port-au-Prince
Stade Sylvio Cator
Capacity: 15,000
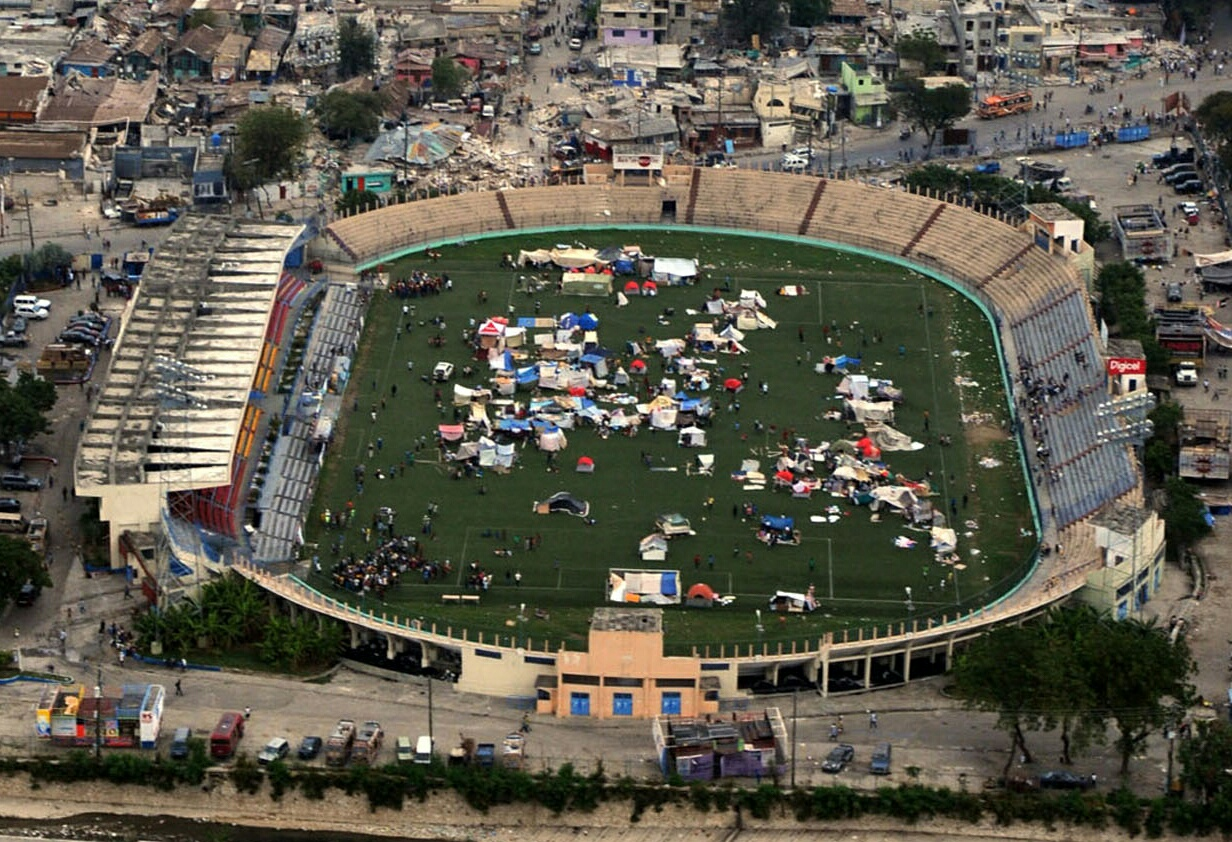

== Results ==
=== Group stage ===
==== Group A ====
Team	Pld	W	D	L	GF	GA	GD	Pts
United States	3	3	0	0	34	0	+34	6
Trinidad and Tobago	3	1	1	1	4	12	−8	3
Mexico	3	1	0	2	9	16	−7	2
Martinique	3	0	1	2	2	21	−19	1

18 April 1991

United States	12–0	Mexico
Hamm 8'; Akers 10', 25'; Heinrichs 21', 36'; Foudy 28'; Chastain 40', 43', 47', 66', 74'; Jennings 77'	Report

Stade Sylvio Cator, Port-au-Prince
Attendance: 40,000
18 April 1991

Martinique	1–1	Trinidad and Tobago

Stade Sylvio Cator, Port-au-Prince

20 April 1991

Trinidad and Tobago	3–1	Mexico

Stade Sylvio Cator, Port-au-Prince
20 April 1991

United States	12–0	Martinique
Heinrichs (?); Akers (?); Hamm (?); Biefeld (?); Foudy (?); Gebauer (?); Chastain (?)	Report

Stade Sylvio Cator, Port-au-Prince

22 April 1991

Martinique	1–8	Mexico

Stade Sylvio Cator, Port-au-Prince
22 April 1991

United States	10–0	Trinidad and Tobago
Hamm (?); Jennings (?); Gebauer (?); Akers (?); Bates (?); Chastain (?)	Report

Stade Sylvio Cator, Port-au-Prince

==== Group B ====
Team	Pld	W	D	L	GF	GA	GD	Pts
Canada	3	3	0	0	17	0	+17	6
Haiti	3	2	0	1	5	2	+3	4
Costa Rica	3	1	0	2	2	11	−9	2
Jamaica	3	0	0	3	1	12	−11	0

16 April 1991

Canada	6–0	Costa Rica
McEachern 15'; Hooper 22', 48'; Vamos 29'; Gareau 59'; Caron 70'	Report; Report

Stade Sylvio Cator, Port-au-Prince
Attendance: 40,000
17 April 1991

Jamaica	0–1	Haiti

Stade Sylvio Cator, Port-au-Prince
Attendance: 40,000

19 April 1991

Canada	9–0	Jamaica
Gareau 5', 24', 75'; Hooper 13', 28', 59', 63'; Vamos 66'; Mairs (?)	Report; Report

Stade Sylvio Cator, Port-au-Prince
Attendance: 40,000
19 April 1991

Haiti	4–0	Costa Rica

Stade Sylvio Cator, Port-au-Prince
Attendance: 40,000

21 April 1991

Jamaica	1–2	Costa Rica
	Report	Alemán (?); Álvarez (?)

Stade Sylvio Cator, Port-au-Prince
Attendance: 40,000
21 April 1991

Haiti	0–2	Canada
	Report; Report	Hooper 20'; Vamos 57'

Stade Sylvio Cator, Port-au-Prince
Attendance: 40,000

=== Knockout stage ===
==== Bracket ====
Semi-finals
24 April
Canada	6
Trinidad and Tobago	0
25 April
United States	10
Haiti	0

Final
27 April
Canada	0
United States	5
Third place
28 April
Trinidad and Tobago	4
Haiti	2

==== Semi-finals ====
24 April 1991

Canada	6–0	Trinidad and Tobago
Caron 41', 54', 55'; Vamos 51', 79'; Cant 70'	Report; Report

Stade Sylvio Cator, Port-au-Prince
Attendance: 10,000

25 April 1991

United States	10–0	Haiti
Heinrichs (?); Akers (?); Jennings (?); Bates (?); Lilly (?); Biefeld (?)	Report

Stade Sylvio Cator, Port-au-Prince
Attendance: 40,000

==== Third place playoff ====
27 April 1991

Trinidad and Tobago	4–2	Haiti

Stade Sylvio Cator, Port-au-Prince

==== Final ====
28 April 1991

Canada	0–5	United States
	Report	Akers 3', 13', 70'; Lilly 15'; Heinrichs 66'

Stade Sylvio Cator, Port-au-Prince
Attendance: 30,000

United States won the tournament and qualified for 1991 FIFA Women's World Cup.

== Awards ==
1991 CONCACAF's Women's Championship winners

United States
First title

== Statistics ==
=== Goalscorers ===
11 goals

- (United States) Michelle Akers

8 goals

- (United States) April Heinrichs

7 goals

- (Canada) Charmaine Hooper
- (United States) Brandi Chastain

5 goals

- (United States) Mia Hamm
- (United States) Carin Jennings

4 goals

- (Canada) Annie Caron
- (Canada) Fabienne Gareau
- (Canada) Lydia Vamos

3 goals

- (United States) Tracey Bates
- (United States) Joy Biefeld-Fawcett
- (United States) Wendy Gebauer

2 goals

- (United States) Julie Foudy
- (United States) Kristine Lilly

1 goal

- (Canada) Connie Cant
- (Canada) Joan McEachern
- (Costa Rica) Karla Alemán
- (Costa Rica) Maritza Álvarez

Own goals

- (Jamaica) Bernadette Mairs (playing against Canada)

=== Final ranking ===
Pos	Team	Pld	W	D	L	GF	GA	GD	Pts
1	United States	5	5	0	0	49	0	+49	10
2	Canada	5	4	0	1	23	5	+18	8
3	Trinidad and Tobago	5	2	1	2	8	20	−12	5
4	Haiti	5	2	0	3	7	16	−9	4
Eliminated in the group stage
5	Mexico	3	1	0	2	9	16	−7	2
6	Costa Rica	3	1	0	2	2	11	−9	2
7	Martinique	3	0	1	2	2	21	−19	1
8	Jamaica	3	0	0	3	1	12	−11	0
