= Wendy Hawthorne =

Canadian soccer player (born 1960)

Personal information
- Date of birth: 7 June 1960 (age 66)
- Place of birth: Vancouver, British Columbia, Canada
- Height: 1.73 m (5 ft 8 in)
- Position: Goalkeeper

College career
| Years | Team | Apps | (Gls) |
| 1980–1984 | UBC Thunderbirds | | |

Senior career*
| Years | Team | Apps | (Gls) |
| 1985–1986 | Richmond Kornerkicks | | |
| 1990–1993 | Surrey Marlins | | |
| 1995–2000 | UBC Alumni | | |
| 2004–2014 | Surrey United | | |

International career
| 1988–1998 | Canada | 15 | (0) |
- * Club domestic league appearances and goals

Wendy Hawthorne (born 7 June 1960) is a Canadian former soccer player who played as a goalkeeper. She was a member of the Canada national team that played at the 1995 FIFA Women's World Cup, their first World Cup appearance, and on the team that won the 1998 CONCACAF championship. Hawthorne was awarded British Columbia Soccer's Order of Merit in 1997 and was appointed the province's Soccer Director for 1997–1998.

In 2020, Hawthorne was inducted into British Columbia's Soccer Hall of Fame twice: individually in recognition of her success in winning 11 British Columbia province championships and four Canada national championships, and as part of the Surrey United team that won the provincial championship eleven years in a row.

== Early years ==
At the age of 13, Hawthorne attended UBC soccer camp with Canadian international Brian Budd as her instructor. At 14 or 15, she started playing with a UBC club team, the UBC Thunder Mamas.

== International career ==
Between 1988 and 1998, Hawthorne had 15 appearances with the Canadian women's national soccer team, during which she kept seven clean sheets. Her debut for Canada was on 29 April 1990, when she was 29 years old. Although she did not feature at the 1995 World Cup in Sweden, during her international career, she won three CONCACAF medals with Canada, including silver in 1991, bronze in 1993, and silver in 1994, and was on the team that won the 1998 CONCACAF championship.

== Club career ==
From 1985 to 2004, Hawthorne won 11 BC provincial championships with four different teams, including the Richmond Kornerkicks in 1985 and 1986; with the Surrey Marlins SC in 1991, 1992, and 1993; the Vancouver UBC Alumni in 1996, 1997, 1998, 1999, and 2000; and with the Surrey United SC in 2004. During the provincial championship final in 2004, Hawthorne suffered an injury to her right knee in the second half, but continued playing through overtime because Surrey United's backup goalkeeper was unavailable. At the time, she told the Surrey Leader that she was motivated to continue by the fact that Surrey United had never won the title before. Hawthorne won four Canada Soccer National Championships in 1991, 1992, 1993, and 1996, and was a six-time runner up. When she retired in 2004, she held the record for most clean sheets at the Canada Soccer National Championships, with 23 clean sheets in 39 matches.

== Other career activity ==
Hawthorne had worked for the Vancouver area transit police since the mid-1980s, and once served as head of BC Transit's anti-vandalism squad. She played as a goalkeeper for a women's soccer team including members of Vancouver Police Department, the RCMP, and other municipal detachments. For several years, she also played with the Vancouver Police Justice team in the men's league. In 2018, she won the Canadian Transit Leadership Award in Excellence.
