= Tracie McGovern =

Australian soccer player

Personal information
- Full name: Tracie McGovern
- Date of birth: 21 April 1978 (age 48)
- Place of birth: Wauchope, Australia
- Height: 1.75 m (5 ft 9 in)
- Positions: Midfielder; defender

Youth career
- 1983–1993: Wauchope FC

Senior career*
Years	Team	Apps	(Gls)
1994–1999	Newcastle Jets (Northern Soccer Federation)	100	(7)

International career
1997–1999	Australia	4	(0)
- * Club domestic league appearances and goals

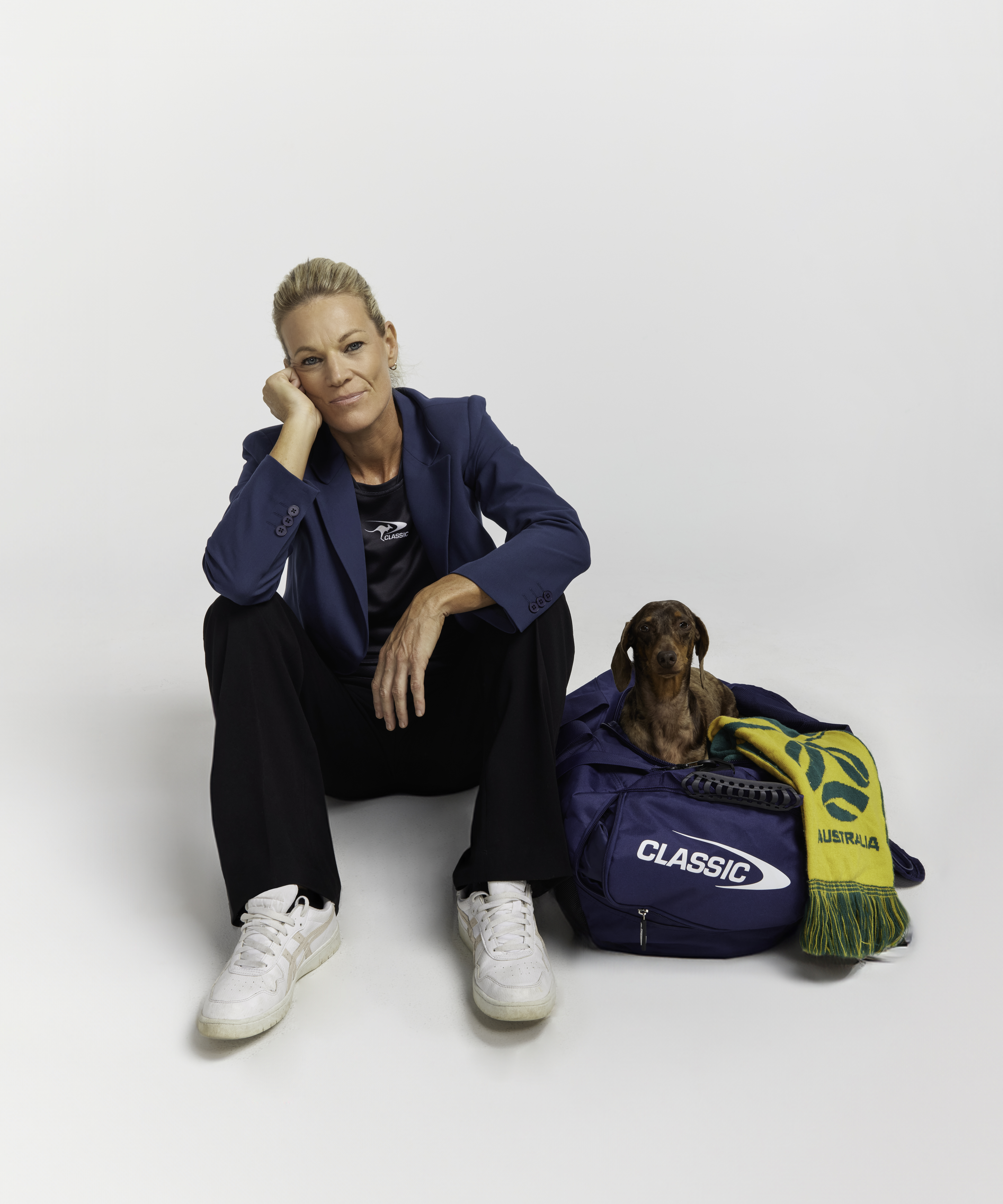
Trae McGovern, Brand Ambassador Classic Sportswear / Dina Uniform Group

Tracie (Trae) McGovern (born 21 April 1978 in Wauchope) is a retired Australian international football player. Matilda #102 - A former midfielder and defender, Trae McGovern enjoyed a five-year professional football career with the Northern Pride in the Ansett Summer series (now known as the Newcastle Jets in the A-League Women’s) and represented Australia from 1997 as part of the Matildas, training at the Australian Institute of Sport full time between 1998 and 2000, striving for selection in the Sydney Olympics.

Trae featured in the Matildas’ calendar, a moment that remains part of the team’s cultural history. Beyond the pitch, she carved out an career in the mining industry as an underground Safety Adviser and Captain of the Mines Rescue Team. In 2016 she founded The Australian Sportswoman, a media platform dedicated to raising the profile of our Australian female athletes and sports teams and mentoring aspiring female athletes in Well-being.

Trae currently leads Workplace Health & Safety and Emergency Response Training for Palm Lake Group. Trae is an brand ambassador for Classic Sportswear & Dina Uniform Group, contributing to the sister brand’s Women’s First initiatives: https://classicsports.com.au/blogs/news/classic-furthers-commitment-to-women-in-sport

.
