= Lazare Garreau =

French botaist and military physician

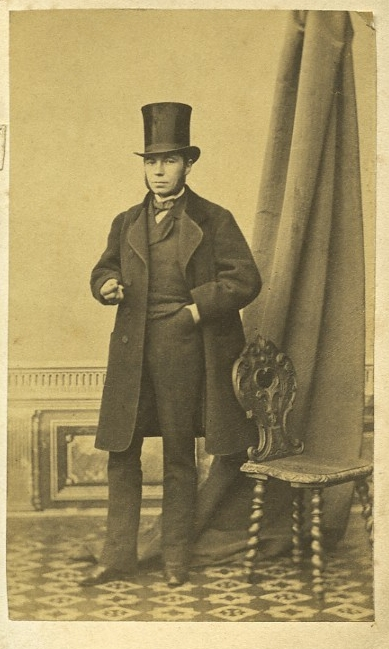
- Carte-de-visite, Auguste studio, Nantes
- Born: 16 March 1812; Autun, France
- Died: 15 November 1892 (aged 80)
- Education: Autun college, BA (1833), Montpellier
- Occupations: botanist, pharmacist, military physician
- Known for: plant physiology experiments
- Notable work: using carbon disulphide for fumigation and destruction of insect pests in 1854
- Spouse: Laure Barrois

Lazare Garreau (16 March 1812 – 15 November 1892) was a French botanist, pharmacist and military physician. Garreau established through experimentation that plants could absorb water through leaves. He also examined plant respiration and nutrition.

== Life and work ==
Garreau was born in Autun where his father was a cabinet maker. He was taught by a priest in the local parish who took children on botanical and geological outings. He went to the Autun college but had to leave due to financial difficulties and began to work at the Berger pharmacy and later with Blondeau, a pharmacist on the Rue de Toumon. He later went to study and obtained a BA in 1833 and then joined the military training hospital at Strasbourg. He then worked as a surgeon in Maubeuge while also studying science at Val-de-Grâce. He then worked for a while at various hospitals as part of army duty and obtained leave in 1840 to study medicine at Montpellier. He became a military pharmacist with the rank of brevet major and then served from 1841 to 1844 in Strasbourg. He became a professor at the Military Training Centre, Lille. Here he married Laure Barrois and while at Lille he began experiments in plant physiology. In 1850, the military training centre at Lille was closed and he was made professor of chemistry and pharmacy at Lille High School. He resigned from service in 1854 and tried to return to academics. His doctoral thesis on the ascent of sap in plants was rejected by Sorbonne in 1855. In 1859 he submitted a thesis on nitrogenous matter in plants and its movement and this earned him a doctorate from Strasbourg. He received a diploma in pharmacy in 1860 and bought a pharmacy that he ran to supplement his income. In 1873 he was appointed professor of chemistry and toxicology and he retired in 1886.

Garreau's plant physiology experiments included studies on the production of water vapour by plants, the absorption of water from leaf surfaces, and the association between stomata and evaporation. He also identified that carbon dioxide was used by plants and noted differences in plant activity by day and night. He noted the production of heat, particularly in the inflorescence of Arums. Garreau noted the possibility for using carbon disulphide for fumigation and destruction of insect pests in 1854.
