= Annie Caron (soccer) =

Canadian soccer player

Personal information
- Date of birth: 6 May 1964 (age 62)
- Place of birth: Sainte-Foy, Quebec, Canada
- Height: 1.60 m (5 ft 3 in)
- Positions: Forward; midfielder

International career^{‡}
| Years | Team | Apps | (Gls) |
| 1986–1995 | Canada | 34 | (8) |
- ‡ National team caps and goals as of (through the 1995 FIFA Women's World Cup)

Annie Caron (born 6 May 1964) is a Canadian soccer player who played both as a forward and midfielder for the Canada women's national soccer team. She was part of the team at the 1995 FIFA Women's World Cup.

== International career ==
Caron was one of the 23 soccer players that participated in the first-ever Canadian women’s national camp in July 1986 in Winnipeg. She made 34 appearances for Canada and scored 8 goals and assisted 1. Her international debut was on July 7, 1986 against the United States. She earned two silver medals representing Canada at the CONCACAF Women's Championships. (Haiti 1991 and Canada 1994). Caron scored Canada's first hat-trick in a FIFA Women's competition at the 1991 CONCACAF Women's Championship in Port-au-Prince, Haiti.

== International goals ==
| No. | Date | Venue | Opponent | Score | Result | Competition |
|---|---|---|---|---|---|---|
| 1. | 7 July 1987 | Blaine, United States | United States | ?–? | 2–4 | Friendly |
| 2. | 3 June 1988 | Foshan, China | Ivory Coast | 1–0 | 6–0 | 1988 FIFA Women's Invitation Tournament |
| 3. | 3 June 1988 | Foshan, China | Ivory Coast | 2–0 | 6–0 | 1988 FIFA Women's Invitation Tournament |
| 4. | 16 April 1991 | Port-au-Prince, Haiti | Costa Rica | 6–0 | 6–0 | 1991 CONCACAF Women's Championship |
| 5. | 24 April 1991 | Port-au-Prince, Haiti | Trinidad and Tobago | 1–0 | 6–0 | 1991 CONCACAF Women's Championship |
| 6. | 24 April 1991 | Port-au-Prince, Haiti | Trinidad and Tobago | 3–0 | 6–0 | 1991 CONCACAF Women's Championship |
| 7. | 24 April 1991 | Port-au-Prince, Haiti | Trinidad and Tobago | 4–0 | 6–0 | 1991 CONCACAF Women's Championship |
| 8. | 19 May 1995 | Dallas, United States | United States | 1–3 | 1–9 | Friendly |

== Honours ==
- 2021: Canada Soccer Hall of Fame
