= Pierre Éliane =

French singer and Carmelite friar

Pierre Éliane (Nancy, France, 23 August 1955) is a French priest, Carmelite friar, singer and songwriter. During the 1980s he wrote songs in Montmartre, and collaborated with Charlélie Couture. Since entering monastic life he turned his songwriting and recording to the lyrics of Thérèse of Lisieux and Spanish Carmelite John of the Cross. He was ordained as a priest in 1997.

== Discography ==
Popular

- Absence (1978)
- Le danseur fou (1978)
- Car il faut plaire (1980)
- On change de peau (1981)
- Les amateurs maladroits (1983)
  - Single A: "Chambres D'Hotel" B: "Peyotl" Philips (1983)
- Littérature (1984)
- Monogame (1985)

Religious

- Thérèse Songs (blanc) (1992)
- Thérèse Songs (rose) (1994)
- Thérèse Songs (bleu) (1994)
- Sainte Thérèse de Lisieux - poésies (1997)
- Les chansons mystiques de Jean de la Croix (1999)
- Teresa de Jesus (2002)
- Elisabeth Songs (2003)
- Dix psaumes (2006)
- Les chansons du pauvre Jonas (2007)
- Reissue of CD les chansons de Jean de la croix as book CD (2008)
- Tagore Songs (2014)
