= Nicole Sedgwick =

Canadian soccer player

Personal information
- Full name: Nicole Sedgwick Stewart
- Date of birth: 19 January 1974 (age 52)
- Place of birth: Vancouver, British Columbia, Canada
- Height: 1.60 m (5 ft 3 in)
- Position: Defender

College career
Years	Team	Apps	(Gls)
1992–1996	UBC Thunderbirds		
1996–1997	Florida State Seminoles	35	(3)

International career
1995–1996	Canada	12	(0)

Nicole Sedgwick (born 19 January 1974) is a Canadian soccer player who played as a defender for the Canada women's national soccer team. She was part of the team at the 1995 FIFA Women's World Cup.
