= Ludovic Garreau =

French ice hockey player

- Born: 21 February 1983 (age 42); Annecy, FRA
- Height: 5 ft 9 in (175 cm)
- Weight: 163 lb (74 kg; 11 st 9 lb)
- Position: Defence
- Shot: Right
- Played for: Aigles de Nice; Rapaces de Gap; LHC Les Lions; Castors d'Avignon
- Playing career: 2002–2011

Ludovic Garreau (born 21 February 1983) is a French former professional ice hockey player. He is currently head coach of the Scorpions de Mulhouse under-22 team.

== Career ==
Garreau began his senior career with FFHG Division 1 team Aigles de Nice in 2002. He moved to Rapaces de Gap of the Ligue Magnus for 2003 and 2004 before departing for Sweden's Division 2 in 2005. He played one season with Vimmerby IK and another with Grästorps IK before returning to France and the Lyon Hockey Club for 2007.

While he never played for a championship winning team, Garreau twice played with teams finishing in second place: the junior Anglet Hormadi team in 2001 and the Lyon Hockey Club FFHG Division 2 team of 2007.

In 2009, he joined Castors d'Avignon of Division 1, as captain and coach (started from the sixth match against Deuil-Garges) and in the 2010 season helped Avignon club achieve success. He retired in 2011 and became Youth Hockey Supervisor of Scorpions de Mulhouse and later became head coach of their under-22 team.
