= Louisa Akpagu =

Nigerian footballer

Personal information
- Date of birth: 22 December 1974 (age 51)
- Position: Goalkeeper

International career^{‡}
Years	Team	Apps	(Gls)
- Nigeria
- ‡ National team caps and goals as of 5 June 1995 (before the 1995 FIFA Women's World Cup)

Louisa Akpagu (born 22 December 1974) is a Nigerian former footballer who played as a goalkeeper. She is a member of the Nigeria women's national football team. She was part of the team at the 1995 FIFA Women's World Cup.
