= Anika Bozicevic =

Swedish footballer

Personal information
- Date of birth: 8 November 1972 (age 53)
- Position: Forward

Senior career*
Years	Team	Apps	(Gls)
- Malmö

International career^{‡}
- Sweden
- * Club domestic league appearances and goals ‡ National team caps and goals as of 5 June 1995 (before the 1995 FIFA Women's World Cup)

Anika Bozicevic (born 8 November 1972) is a Swedish footballer who played as a forward for the Sweden women's national football team. She was part of the team at the 1995 FIFA Women's World Cup. On club level she played for Malmö in Sweden. She is of Croatian heritage.
