= Ingrid Sternhoff =

Norwegian footballer (born 1977)

Personal information
- Full name: Ingrid Sternhoff
- Date of birth: 25 February 1977 (age 49)
- Place of birth: Haugesund, Norway
- Height: 1.90 m (6 ft 3 in)
- Position: Goalkeeper

Youth career
- SK Nord
- SK Vard

College career
Years	Team	Apps	(Gls)
1997–1999	Hartford Hawks		

Senior career*
Years	Team	Apps	(Gls)
- SK Haugar
1997	Kolbotn IL		
2000	Boston Renegades	3	(0)
2001	SK Haugar		
2002–2003	Klepp IL		

International career
1992–1993	Norway U16	8	(0)
1994–1996	Norway U20	9	(0)
1995	Norway	2	(0)
Medal record
Olympic Games
Bronze medal – third place	1996 Atlanta	Team
World Cup
Gold medal – first place	1995 Sweden	Team
- * Club domestic league appearances and goals

Ingrid Sternhoff (born 25 February 1977) is a Norwegian former football goalkeeper.

== Sports career ==
As a child Sternhoff played for SK Nord and SK Vard. Sternhoff was a Norway youth international between 1992 and 1996. She played for SK Haugar when she was called up to the Norwegian national team for the first time. She made her international debut with two games in the 1995 Algarve Cup, which became her only international outings.

As an understudy to the celebrated Bente Nordby, she was an unused substitute on the Norwegian team that won the 1995 FIFA Women's World Cup in Sweden. She also featured on the Norwegian panel that won the bronze medal for Women's Football at the 1996 Summer Olympics.

Her clubs include Kolbotn IL, Klepp IL as well as another spell in SK Haugar. Sternhoff went to college in America, attending the University of Hartford. While at the University of Hartford she played for the university soccer team. In 2000 she played for Boston Renegades of the USL W-League. She made three appearances. She returned home to Norway ahead of the 2001 season and re-joined SK Haugar, intending to play outfield as a central defender.
