= Denie Pentecost =

Australian soccer player and film director

Personal information
- Date of birth: 23 April 1970 (age 56)
- Position: Midfielder

Senior career*
Years	Team	Apps	(Gls)
- Sydney Olympic

International career^{‡}
1994–1995	Australia	14	(1)
- * Club domestic league appearances and goals ‡ National team caps and goals as of 1995

Denie Pentecost (born 23 April 1970) is an Australian film director and former international soccer player who played as a midfielder. She was a member of the Australia women's national soccer team at the 1994 OFC Women's Championship and 1995 FIFA Women's World Cup. At club level she played for Sydney Olympic in Australia. Pentecost directed the short film Sexy Thing, which was in competition at the 2006 Cannes Film Festival.
