= Eliane (footballer) =

Brazilian football player (born 1971)

Personal information
- Full name: Eliane Perreira da Silva
- Date of birth: 22 April 1971 (age 55)
- Position: Goalkeeper

International career
Years	Team	Apps	(Gls)
- Brazil

Eliane Perreira da Silva (born 22 April 1971), commonly known simply as Eliane or Lia, is a Brazilian women's international footballer who plays as a goalkeeper. She is a member of the Brazil women's national football team. She was part of the team at the 1995 FIFA Women's World Cup.
