= Traci Bartlett =

Australian former soccer player

Traci Bartlett (born 17 May 1972) is an Australian former soccer player who played as a defender. She played for the Australian national team, nicknamed the Matildas, from 1991 to 2001, appearing in a total of 64 international matches. Bartlett played club soccer for Marconi, Canberra Eclipse and Queensland Sting.
