= Claire Nichols =

Australian soccer player

Personal information
- Date of birth: 8 July 1975 (age 51)
- Position: Goalkeeper

Senior career*
Years	Team	Apps	(Gls)
- Liverpool (NSW)

International career^{‡}
- Australia
- * Club domestic league appearances and goals ‡ National team caps and goals as of 5 June 1995 (before the 1995 FIFA Women's World Cup)

Claire Nichols (born 7 August 1975) is an Australian former footballer who played as a goalkeeper for the Australia women's national soccer team. She competed at the 1994 OFC Women's Championship and 1995 FIFA Women's World Cup. At the club level, she played for Liverpool (NSW) in Australia.
