= Li Ying (footballer, born 1973) =

Chinese footballer

Personal information
- Full name: Li Ying
- Date of birth: 21 October 1973 (age 53)
- Place of birth: China
- Position: Midfielder

International career
Years	Team	Apps	(Gls)
- China

Li Ying (Chinese: 李影; pinyin: Lǐ Yǐng; born 21 October 1973) is a Chinese former footballer who played as a midfielder for the China women's national team.

== Career ==
Li was included in China's squad for the 1995 FIFA Women's World Cup in Sweden. The team managed to reach the semi-finals, where they lost to Germany. The team subsequently finished fourth after losing in the third place play-off against the United States.
