= Hege Gunnerød =

Norwegian footballer (born 1973)

Personal information
- Full name: Hege Gunnerød
- Date of birth: 22 November 1973 (age 52)
- Place of birth: Asker, Norway
- Positions: Defender; midfielder

Senior career*
Years	Team	Apps	(Gls)
1991–2002	Asker		
2003–2004	Liungen IF		

International career^{‡}
1995–1998	Norway	6	(0)
Medal record
Women's football
Representing Norway
World Cup
Gold medal – first place	Sweden 1995	Team
- * Club domestic league appearances and goals as of 14:16, 21 September 2014 (UTC) ‡ National team caps and goals as of 14:16, 21 September 2014 (UTC)

Hege Gunnerød (born 22 November 1973) is a Norwegian former football player who played on the Norway women's national football team that won the 1995 FIFA Women's World Cup in Sweden. At club level she played for 13 seasons with Asker, later coaching the club's youth teams. She emerged from retirement to play as an emergency goalkeeper for Asker in 2006.
