= Kristin Sandberg =

Norwegian footballer (born 1972)

Personal information
- Date of birth: 23 March 1972 (age 54)
- Position: Forward

Senior career*
Years	Team	Apps	(Gls)
- Asker

International career
1988	Norway U16	3	(1)
1990–1993	Norway U20	10	(3)
1993–1995	Norway	31	(16)
Medal record
Representing Norway
Women's football
World championship
Gold medal – first place	Sweden 1995	Team
- * Club domestic league appearances and goals

Kristin Sandberg (born 23 March 1972) is a Norwegian former footballer who played as a forward for Asker. She played 31 matches for the Norway national team scoring 16 goals and was part of the team that won the 1995 FIFA Women's World Cup. In her World Cup debut in 1995, she scored a hat-trick, as the first Norwegian to do so in a World Cup game.

== Career statistics ==
Scores and results list Norway's goal tally first, score column indicates score after each Sandberg goal.

List of international goals scored by Kristin Sandberg
No.	Date	Venue	Opponent	Score	Result	Competition
1	4 September 1993	Gvarv, Norway	Czech Republic	6–1	6–1	UEFA Women's Euro 1995 qualifying
2	16 March 1994	Portimão, Portugal	Finland	5–0	6–0	1994 Algarve Cup
3	24 September 1994	Prague, Czech Republic	Czech Republic	1–0	9–0	UEFA Women's Euro 1995 qualifying
4	24 September 1994	Prague, Czech Republic	Czech Republic	4–0	9–0	UEFA Women's Euro 1995 qualifying
5	24 September 1994	Prague, Czech Republic	Czech Republic	7–0	9–0	UEFA Women's Euro 1995 qualifying
6	24 September 1994	Prague, Czech Republic	Czech Republic	8–0	9–0	UEFA Women's Euro 1995 qualifying
7	26 February 1995	Kristiansand, Norway	Sweden	2–2	4–3	UEFA Women's Euro 1995
8	19 March 1995	Quarteira, Portugal	United States	1–1	3–3 (a.e.t.) (4–2 p)	1995 Algarve Cup
9	6 June 1995	Karlstad, Sweden	Nigeria	1–0	8–0	1995 FIFA Women's World Cup
10	6 June 1995	Karlstad, Sweden	Nigeria	2–0	8–0	1995 FIFA Women's World Cup
11	6 June 1995	Karlstad, Sweden	Nigeria	7–0	8–0	1995 FIFA Women's World Cup
