= Louise McMurtrie =

Australian soccer player (born 1976)

Personal information
- Date of birth: 26 April 1976 (age 50)
- Position: Defender

Senior career*
Years	Team	Apps	(Gls)
- Queensland Academy of Sport

International career
	Australia	19	(0)
- * Club domestic league appearances and goals

Louise McMurtrie (born 26 April 1976) is an Australian former soccer player who played as a defender for the Australia women's national soccer team. She was part of the team at the 1995 FIFA Women's World Cup. At the club level, she played for Queensland Academy of Sport in Australia. McMurtrie represented Australia 27 times between 1994 and 1996, including 19 times in full international matches.
