= Joan McEachern =

Canadian soccer player

Personal information
- Date of birth: 12 April 1963 (age 63)
- Place of birth: Leroy, Saskatchewan
- Position: Midfielder

International career^{‡}
Years	Team	Apps	(Gls)
1987–1995	Canada	31	(2)
- ‡ National team caps and goals as of 5 June 1995 (before the 1995 FIFA Women's World Cup)

Joan McEachern (born April 12, 1963) is a Canadian soccer player who played as a midfielder for the Canada women's national soccer team. She was part of the team at the 1995 FIFA Women's World Cup.

In 1999, McEachern was inducted into the Canadian Soccer Hall of Fame.
