= Patrícia Sequeira =

Portuguese footballer (born 1973)

Personal information
- Birth name: Patrícia Alexandra Pimentel Sequeira
- Date of birth: 4 November 1973 (age 52)
- Position: Midfielder

Senior career*
Years	Team	Apps	(Gls)
1993–2002	Benfica		

International career
1993–2002	Portugal	75	(13)
- * Club domestic league appearances and goals

Patrícia Sequeira (born 4 November 1973) is a Portuguese footballer who played for Benfica and the Portuguese national team.

== International career ==
Patrícia Sequeira represented Portugal 75 times and scored 13 goals.
