= Leanne Trimboli =

Australian soccer player

Personal information
- Date of birth: 10 November 1975 (age 50)
- Place of birth: Australia
- Height: 1.68 m (5 ft 6 in)
- Position: Goalkeeper

Youth career
- 2: Brahma Lodge Soccer Club
- 2: Modbury Vista Soccer Club

Senior career*
Years	Team	Apps	(Gls)
4	Adelaide Sensation (pre Adelaide United)		
1	Western Waves		
6	Sturt Marion Women's Soccer Club		
2	Elizabeth City Soccer Club		

International career
1999–2001	Australia	3	(0)
- * Club domestic league appearances and goals

Leanne Trimboli (born 10 November 1975) is a former Australian soccer goalkeeper who played three matches for the Australia women's national soccer team. She was a member of the Australian team at the 2000 Summer Olympics.

She grew up in Adelaide, South Australia where she started playing club football in 1990 at 14yrs of age before joining the South Australian Institute of Sport program (1995 - 2001) and later the Australian Institute of Sport (AIS) women's program. She was also a member of the Adelaide Sensation (formerly known as the SASI Pirates) in the Women's National League competition.

Leanne also has a black belt in Tae-Kwon-Do (TKD). In 1999, still not a member of the Australian Women's Football Team, she was nominated for the Olympic TKD trials. As luck would have it, she was called into camp with the Matildas (in October 1999) & subsequently toured China while the TKD trials were held in Adelaide. Upon her return to Adelaide, she was asked to move to the AIS in Canberra to train with the National Team full-time leading up to the Sydney 2000 Olympics. 48 hours post Olympic closing ceremony, Leanne was back in uniform & on the night shift with SA Police.

== Personal life ==
- Leanne Trimboli is a Police Officer with South Australia Police, she joined in 1997 & is currently a Detective Senior Sergeant.
- She has a daughter named Mia who is also a goal keeper with the South Australian State Program.
- Leanne holds a Football Australia Senior 'C' & Youth Goal Keeper Licence. Having started coaching in 1994, she has Coached extensively across South Australia & with the Australian School Girls 2007 & 2008.
