= Éliane Jeannin-Garreau =

Éliane Jeannin-Garreau (March 18, 1911 – June 15, 1999) served in World War II in France as part of the French Resistance.

== Biography ==
She studied painting in Paris from 1933 before having to take a job at a bank because of her family's financial difficulties. After the German invasion she worked in underground journalism and used her apartment to hide people from the Germans.

She was the "right-hand person" to the leader of the French Resistance. Nazis captured her and placed her in Ravensbrück. While there, she was tortured for the name of the leader (whom they had also unknowingly captured), but she would not speak. When she was not being tortured or working she would draw different scenes of what was happening in the women's concentration camps.

She was moved to Flossenbürg concentration camp in mid-April 1944 and, after refusing to use her artistic skills to make items for the Germans she was punished by being made to carry out construction work.

She was eventually released and married Roger Garreau in 1948. She had one daughter, Anne. She wrote a book about her experiences, titled Les Cris de la Memoire or Cries of Memory. She had her sister, Nicole Jeannin Neilson, translate it for her into English (Neilson also served in World War II as a codebreaker). She met her American husband during the war and moved to California, where she lived with her husband and eight children. She died in Issy-les-Moulineaux in 1999.
