= Éliane Amado Levy-Valensi =

French Israeli psychoanalyst and philosopher (1919–2006)

Éliane Amado Levy-Valensi (Hebrew: אליענה אמדו לוי-ולנסי; May 11, 1919 – May 10, 2006) was a French-Israeli psychologist, psychoanalyst and philosopher.

== Biography ==
Éliane Levy-Valensi was born in Marseille to a Jewish family. In 1930 she moved with her parents to Saint-Mandé (Val-de-Marne) near Paris.

She studied philosophy. She entered the Centre national de la recherche scientifique (CNRS), preparing her doctoral thesis. She taught philosophy at the Sorbonne

In 1968 she emigrated to Israel, and became a professor of philosophy at Bar-Ilan University.

== Family ==
She married Max Amado in 1942 and divorced from him in 1953. In 1960 she married Claude Veil, a psychiatrist and professor, and divorced from him in 1969.

== Books ==
- Les problèmes de la femme dans le monde moderne et le judaïsme, 1961
- Le Dialogue psychanalytique : Les rapports intersubjectifs en psychanalyse, la vocation du sujet, 1962
- Les Niveaux de l'être : La connaissance et le mal, 1963
- Le Temps dans la vie psychologique, 1964
- Mal radical et rédemption dans la tradition mystique du judaïsme : l'assomption d'un destin, 1965
- La Communication, 1967
- Le Temps dans la vie morale, 1968
- Isaac gardien de son frère ? : Implications inconscientes du dialogue israélo-arabe, 1968
- La Racine et la source : Essais sur la judaïsme, 1968
- Les voies et les pièges de la psychanalyse, 1971
- Tentations et actions de la conscience juive : données et débats. VIe et VIIIe colloques d'intellectuels juifs de langue française organisés par la Section française du Congrès juif mondial, 1971
- Israël dans la conscience juive : données et débats. VIIe et IXe colloques d'intellectuels juifs de langue française organisés par la Section française du Congrès juif mondial, 1971
- Dictionnaire du judaisme français, 1972
- Le Grand désarroi : Aux sources de l'énigme homosexuelle, 1973
- La nature de la pensée inconsciente, 1978
- La Onzième épreuve d'Abraham ou De la Fraternité, 1981
- Lettres de Jerusalem, 1983
- Le Moïse de Freud, ou, La référence occultée, 1984
- À la gauche du Seigneur, ou, L'illusion ideologique, 1987
- Job : réponse à Jung, 1991
- La nevrose plurielle, 1992
- Trois visions du temp, 1993
- La dignité des mots, 1995
- La Poétique du Zohar, 1996
- Penser ou/et rêver: Mécanismes et objectifs de la pensée en Occident et dans le Judaïsme, 1997
- L'Imagination : Philosophie et tradition juive, 1998
- La nature de la pensée inconsciente, 1999
- Profession: parents juifs / Haim Harboun ; préface de Eliane Amado Levy-Valensi, 1999.
