= Kaylene Janssen =

Australian soccer player (born 1968)

Personal information
- Date of birth: 18 August 1968 (age 58)
- Position: Midfielder

Senior career*
Years	Team	Apps	(Gls)
- Eastern Suburbs

International career^{‡}
- Australia
- * Club domestic league appearances and goals ‡ National team caps and goals as of 5 June 1995 (before the 1995 FIFA Women's World Cup)

Kaylene Janssen (born 18 August 1968) is an Australian former footballer who played as a midfielder for the Australia women's national soccer team. She was part of the team at the 1994 OFC Women's Championship and 1995 FIFA Women's World Cup. At the club level, she played for Eastern Suburbs in Australia.
