= Anita Waage =

Norwegian footballer (born 1971)

Medal record

Women's football

Representing Norway

World Cup
Gold medal – first place	1995 Sweden	Team

Anita Waage (born 30 July 1971) is a former Norwegian football player and World Champion.

She was a member of the Norwegian team that won the 1995 FIFA World Cup in Sweden.

== Career ==
She hails from Hareid. Her clubs include Spjelkavik IL, IK Grand Bodø, Trondheims-Ørn SK, and Kolbotn.

She has four Norwegian Cup championships (1994, 1996, 1997, 1998) and four league championships (1994, 1995, 1996, 1997) with Trondheims-Ørn.
