= 1991 FIFA Women's World Cup Group B =

Football tournament group stage

Group B of the 1991 FIFA Women's World Cup took place from 17 to 21 November 1991. The group consisted of Brazil, Japan, Sweden and the United States.

== Standings ==
Pos	Team	Pld	W	D	L	GF	GA	GD	Pts	Qualification
1	United States	3	3	0	0	11	2	+9	6	Advance to knockout stage
2	Sweden	3	2	0	1	12	3	+9	4	Advance to knockout stage
3	Brazil	3	1	0	2	1	7	−6	2	
4	Japan	3	0	0	3	0	12	−12	0	

Source: FIFA
Rules for classification: Group stage tiebreakers

== Matches ==
All times listed are local, CST (UTC+8).

=== Japan vs Brazil ===
17 November 1991
19:45

Japan	0–1	Brazil
	Report	Elane 4'

New Plaza Stadium, Foshan
Attendance: 14,000
Referee: Lu Jun (China PR)

GK	1	Masae Suzuki
DF	2	Midori Honda
DF	4	Mayumi Kaji
DF	5	Sayuri Yamaguchi
DF	13	Kyoko Kuroda
MF	8	Michiko Matsuda
MF	10	Asako Takakura	(substituted off) 52'
MF	11	Futaba Kioka
FW	9	Akemi Noda
FW	15	Kaori Nagamine
FW	16	Takako Tezuka
Substitutions:
FW	17	Yuriko Mizuma	(substituted on) 52'
Manager:
Tamotsu Suzuki

GK	1	Meg
DF	2	Rosa Lima
DF	3	Marisa		(substituted off) 15'
DF	4	Elane	(yellow card) 67'
DF	8	Solange
MF	5	Marcinha
MF	6	Fanta
MF	17	Danda	(yellow card) 79'
MF	18	Fia	(yellow card) 58'
FW	9	Adriana		(substituted off) 70'
FW	10	Roseli
Substitutions:
DF	16	Doralice		(substituted on) 15'
FW	11	Cenira		(substituted on) 70'
Manager:
Fernando Pires

=== Sweden vs United States ===
17 November 1991
19:45

Sweden	2–3	United States
Videkull 65'; I. Johansson 71'	Report	Jennings 40', 49'; Hamm 62'

Ying Tung Stadium, Guangzhou
Attendance: 14,000
Referee: John Toro Rendón (Colombia)

GK	1	Elisabeth Leidinge
DF	2	Malin Lundgren
DF	3	Anette Hansson
DF	4	Camilla Fors		(substituted off) 54'
DF	5	Eva Zeikfalvy
MF	6	Malin Swedberg
MF	7	Pia Sundhage
MF	17	Marie Karlsson		(substituted off) 64'
FW	9	Helen Johansson	(yellow card) 64'
FW	10	Lena Videkull
FW	11	Anneli Andelén
Substitutions:
MF	16	Ingrid Johansson		(substituted on) 54'
FW	15	Helen Nilsson		(substituted on) 64'
Manager:
Gunilla Paijkull

GK	1	Mary Harvey
DF	4	Carla Werden
DF	14	Joy Biefeld
DF	16	Debbie Belkin
MF	3	Shannon Higgins
MF	9	Mia Hamm	(yellow card) 24'
MF	11	Julie Foudy
MF	13	Kristine Lilly		(substituted off) 33'
FW	2	April Heinrichs
FW	10	Michelle Akers-Stahl
FW	12	Carin Jennings
Substitutions:
DF	8	Linda Hamilton		(substituted on) 33'
Manager:
Anson Dorrance

=== Japan vs Sweden ===
19 November 1991
19:45

Japan	0–8	Sweden
	Report	Videkull 1', 11'; Andelén 15', 60'; Lundgren 25'; Nilsson 27'; Sundhage 34'; Yamaguchi 70' (o.g.)

New Plaza Stadium, Foshan
Attendance: 14,000
Referee: Raja Shrestha Gyanu (Nepal)

GK	1	Masae Suzuki
DF	2	Midori Honda
DF	4	Mayumi Kaji
DF	5	Sayuri Yamaguchi	(yellow card) 55'
DF	13	Kyoko Kuroda
MF	8	Michiko Matsuda
MF	10	Asako Takakura
MF	11	Futaba Kioka
FW	9	Akemi Noda
FW	15	Kaori Nagamine		(substituted off) 67'
FW	16	Takako Tezuka
Substitutions:
FW	17	Yuriko Mizuma		(substituted on) 67'
Manager:
Tamotsu Suzuki

GK	1	Elisabeth Leidinge
DF	2	Malin Lundgren
DF	3	Anette Hansson
DF	5	Eva Zeikfalvy
MF	7	Pia Sundhage
MF	16	Ingrid Johansson
MF	17	Marie Karlsson
FW	9	Helen Johansson	(substituted off) 35'
FW	10	Lena Videkull	(substituted off) 41'
FW	11	Anneli Andelén
FW	15	Helen Nilsson
Substitutions:
DF	14	Camilla Svensson-Gustafsson	(substituted on) 35'
MF	8	Susanne Hedberg	(substituted on) 41'
Manager:
Gunilla Paijkull

=== Brazil vs United States ===
19 November 1991
19:45

Brazil	0–5	United States
	Report	Heinrichs 23', 35'; Jennings 38'; Akers-Stahl 39'; Hamm 63'

Ying Tung Stadium, Guangzhou
Attendance: 15,500
Referee: Vadim Zhuk (Soviet Union)

GK	1	Meg
DF	2	Rosa Lima
DF	3	Marisa
DF	4	Elane
DF	8	Solange		(substituted off) 39'
MF	5	Marcinha
MF	6	Fanta
MF	7	Pelézinha		(substituted off) 46'
MF	14	Nalvinha
FW	10	Roseli	(yellow card) 70'
FW	11	Cenira
Substitutions:
DF	16	Doralice		(substituted on) 39'
MF	15	Pretinha		(substituted on) 46'
Manager:
Fernando Pires

GK	1	Mary Harvey
DF	4	Carla Werden
DF	8	Linda Hamilton
DF	14	Joy Biefeld
MF	3	Shannon Higgins
MF	9	Mia Hamm
MF	11	Julie Foudy
MF	13	Kristine Lilly	(substituted off) 67'
FW	2	April Heinrichs	(substituted off) 41'
FW	10	Michelle Akers-Stahl
FW	12	Carin Jennings
Substitutions:
FW	6	Brandi Chastain	(substituted on) 41'
DF	16	Debbie Belkin	(substituted on) 67'
Manager:
Anson Dorrance

=== Japan vs United States ===
21 November 1991
15:30

Japan	0–3	United States
	Report	Akers-Stahl 20', 37'; Gebauer 39'

New Plaza Stadium, Foshan
Attendance: 14,000
Referee: John Toro Rendón (Colombia)

GK	1	Masae Suzuki
DF	2	Midori Honda
DF	4	Mayumi Kaji
DF	5	Sayuri Yamaguchi
DF	13	Kyoko Kuroda
MF	8	Michiko Matsuda
MF	10	Asako Takakura	(substituted off) 60'
MF	11	Futaba Kioka
FW	9	Akemi Noda
FW	15	Kaori Nagamine
FW	16	Takako Tezuka
Substitutions:
FW	14	Etsuko Handa	(substituted on) 60'
Manager:
Tamotsu Suzuki

GK	1	Mary Harvey
DF	4	Carla Werden	(yellow card) 31'
DF	5	Lori Henry
DF	8	Linda Hamilton
DF	16	Debbie Belkin
MF	7	Tracey Bates
MF	11	Julie Foudy
FW	6	Brandi Chastain
FW	10	Michelle Akers-Stahl		(substituted off) 41'
FW	12	Carin Jennings		(substituted off) 41'
FW	15	Wendy Gebauer
Substitutions:
MF	13	Kristine Lilly		(substituted on) 41'
MF	9	Mia Hamm		(substituted on) 41'
Manager:
Anson Dorrance

=== Brazil vs Sweden ===
21 November 1991
15:30

Brazil	0–2	Sweden
	Report	Sundhage 42' (pen.); Hedberg 56'

Ying Tung Stadium, Guangzhou
Attendance: 12,000
Referee: Lu Jun (China PR)

GK	1	Meg
DF	2	Rosa Lima
DF	3	Marisa
DF	4	Elane
DF	16	Doralice
MF	5	Marcinha	(substituted off) 60'
MF	6	Fanta
MF	13	Márcia Taffarel
FW	9	Adriana	(substituted off) 62'
FW	10	Roseli
FW	11	Cenira
Substitutions:
MF	15	Pretinha	(substituted on) 60'
MF	14	Nalvinha	(substituted on) 62'
Manager:
Fernando Pires

GK	12	Ing-Marie Olsson
DF	4	Camilla Fors
DF	13	Marie Ewrelius
DF	14	Camilla Svensson-Gustafsson
MF	6	Malin Swedberg
MF	7	Pia Sundhage
MF	8	Susanne Hedberg
MF	17	Marie Karlsson	(substituted off) 41'
MF	18	Pärnilla Larsson
FW	11	Anneli Andelén
FW	15	Helen Nilsson
Substitutions:
MF	16	Ingrid Johansson	(substituted on) 41'
Manager:
Gunilla Paijkull

== See also ==
- Brazil at the FIFA Women's World Cup
- Japan at the FIFA Women's World Cup
- Sweden at the FIFA Women's World Cup
- United States at the FIFA Women's World Cup
