= Japan at the FIFA Women's World Cup =

The Japan women's national football team has represented Japan at the FIFA Women's World Cup on ten occasions in 1991, 1995, 1999, 2003, 2007, 2011, 2015, 2019, 2023 and 2027.

They are the only Asian team to have won the tournament, as well as the only Asian team to qualify for every edition and they are the first team that has won the trophy with a loss during the final tournament. They also were runners-up once and is one of the only three Asian Football Confederation teams alongside Australia and China which finished on the top four of the FIFA Women's World Cup.

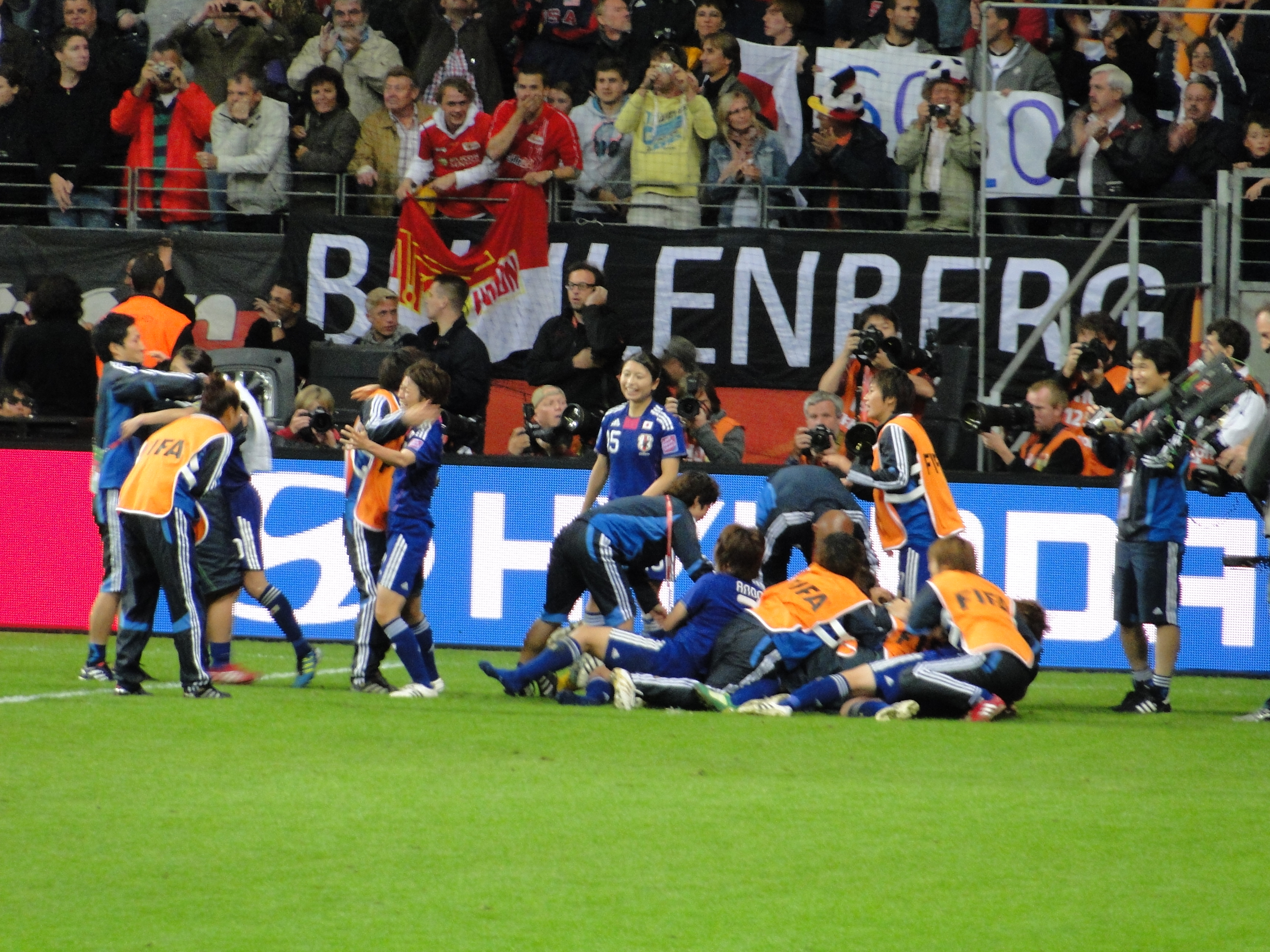
The Japanese team that celebrates winning the 2011 FIFA Women's World Cup

== 1991 World Cup ==
The Japanese national team had qualified for the first World Cup as the runners up of the 1991 Asian Championship. Four wins in the preliminary round against Korea DPR, Hong Kong, Malaysia and Singapore. In the semi-final, penalty shoot-out was necessary to eliminate the Republic of China and qualify for the World Cup. The final was then lost with 0: 5 against the China women's national football team, but the first World Cup participation was already there for sure.

In People's Republic of China, the first World Cup match on November 17, 1991, in Foshan was lost 1–0 to Brazil. Two days later, they were followed by a 0–8 against Sweden and another 0–3 against the United States women's national soccer team two days later. This was Japan as the worst team of the tournament eliminated.

=== Group B ===
Pos	Team	Pld	W	D	L	GF	GA	GD	Pts	Qualification
1	United States	3	3	0	0	11	2	+9	6	Advance to knockout stage
2	Sweden	3	2	0	1	12	3	+9	4	Advance to knockout stage
3	Brazil	3	1	0	2	1	7	−6	2	
4	Japan	3	0	0	3	0	12	−12	0	

Source: FIFA
17 November 1991
19:45

Japan	0–1	Brazil
	Report	Elane 4'

New Plaza Stadium, Foshan
Attendance: 14,000
Referee: Lu Jun (China PR)

19 November 1991
19:45

Japan	0–8	Sweden
	Report	Videkull 1', 11'; Andelén 15', 60'; Lundgren 25'; Nilsson 27'; Sundhage 34'; Yamaguchi 70' (o.g.)

New Plaza Stadium, Foshan
Attendance: 14,000
Referee: Raja Shrestha Gyanu (Nepal)

21 November 1991
15:30

Japan	0–3	United States
	Report	Akers-Stahl 20', 37'; Gebauer 39'

New Plaza Stadium, Foshan
Attendance: 14,000
Referee: John Toro Rendón (Colombia)

== 1995 World Cup ==
Four years later, the Japanese team finished second in Asian Games 1994 in Hiroshima for the second World Cup. Japan, the Republic of China, the People's Republic of China and South Korea met in a group of four. After a 1–1 draw against the People's Republic of China, both won against the other two teams and then met again in the final, the Chinese won 2–0. Both finalists drove to the World Cup, which took place for the first time on European soil.

In Sweden, the Japanese lost again the opening game 0–1, this time against Germany. On June 7, 1995, but then succeeded the Japanese women in Karlstad against Brazil the first World Cup victory. In the process, Akemi Noda get the first two World Cup goals for Japan after a 1–0 deficit. Against Sweden followed then, although a 0–2, but as the second best group Knights reached the Japanese women the quarterfinals. Here followed a 0–4 defeat against defending USA. However, as the eighth best team, Japan had qualified for the women's first football tournament at the Olympic Games, in which only the eight best teams of the World Cup could participate The seventh best team was not allowed to play in the Olympics, Brazil could participate as the ninth best team .

=== Group A ===
Pos	Team	Pld	W	D	L	GF	GA	GD	Pts	Qualification
1	Germany	3	2	0	1	9	4	+5	6	Advance to knockout stage
2	Sweden (H)	3	2	0	1	5	3	+2	6	Advance to knockout stage
3	Japan	3	1	0	2	2	4	−2	3	Advance to knockout stage
4	Brazil	3	1	0	2	3	8	−5	3	

Source: FIFA
(H) Hosts
5 June 1995
14:00

Germany	1–0	Japan
Neid 23'	Report

Tingvalla IP, Karlstad
Attendance: 3,824
Referee: Petros Mathabela (South Africa)

7 June 1995
19:00

Brazil	1–2	Japan
Pretinha 7'	Report	Noda 13', 45'

Tingvalla IP, Karlstad
Attendance: 2,286
Referee: Catherine Leann Hepburn (United States)

9 June 1995
19:00

Sweden	2–0	Japan
Videkull 66'; Andelén 88'	Report

Arosvallen, Västerås
Attendance: 7,811
Referee: Petros Mathabela (South Africa)

=== Quarter-finals ===
13 June 1995
17:15

Japan	0–4	United States
	Report	Lilly 8', 42'; Milbrett 45'; Venturini 80'

Strömvallen, Gävle
Attendance: 3,756
Referee: Eduardo Gamboa (Chile)

== 1999 World Cup ==
For the third World Cup, Japan finished third in the 1997 AFC Women's Championship. After three preliminary round victories against India, Hong Kong and Guam, with the 21: 0 against Guam the highest international victory succeeded, Japan failed in the semifinals 0-1 North Korea. With a 2: 0 against the Republic of China in the match for third place succeeded but the qualification.

In the US, the Japanese faced Canada in the first game and scored 1-1. But then followed two defeats against Russia (0: 5) and defending champion Norway (0: 4), which eliminated Japan as group last.

=== Group C ===
Pos	Team	Pld	W	D	L	GF	GA	GD	Pts	Qualification
1	Norway	3	3	0	0	13	2	+11	9	Advance to knockout stage
2	Russia	3	2	0	1	10	3	+7	6	Advance to knockout stage
3	Canada	3	0	1	2	3	12	−9	1	
4	Japan	3	0	1	2	1	10	−9	1	

Source: FIFA
June 19, 1999
19:00 PDT (UTC−7)

Japan	1–1	Canada
Otake 64'	Report	Burtini 32'

Spartan Stadium, San Jose
Attendance: 23,298
Referee: Maria Edilene Siqueira (Brazil)

June 23, 1999
18:00 PDT (UTC−7)

Japan	0–5	Russia
	Report	Savina 29'; Letyushova 52', 90'; N. Karasseva 58'; Barbashina 80'

Civic Stadium, Portland
Attendance: 17,668
Referee: Sandra Hunt (United States)

June 26, 1999
18:30 CDT (UTC−5)

Norway	4–0	Japan
Riise 8' (pen.); Isozaki 26' (o.g.); Aarønes 36'; Mellgren 61'	Report

Soldier Field, Chicago
Attendance: 34,256
Referee: Marisela Contreras (Venezuela)

== 2003 World Cup ==
Actually, the World Cup should take place again in the People's Republic of China. Due to the SARS epidemic, the tournament was temporarily relocated to the United States. Thus the World Cup took place for the second time in the USA. As the number of starting places was increased from 12 to 16, a fourth Asian team had the chance to qualify in the AFC / CONCACAF playoffs. Japan took advantage of this opportunity after only fourth place in the Asian Cup 2003. There, the Japanese had the preliminary round against Myanmar, the Republic of China, the Philippines and Guam still with four wins and 34 : 0 goals completed in the semi-finals and match for third place but lost to North Korea 0-3 and South Korea 0–1. In the playoffs, they met Mexico and reached 2: 2 in Mexico City. The second leg in Tokyo was won 2-0 seven days later.

In the US, the Japanese met in the opening match on World Cup newcomer Argentina and reached the highest score in a World Cup match with the 6–0. The later record national player and goal scorer Homare Sawa scored the first two goals, Mio even got three. Against the later world champion Germany followed then but a 0-3 and against Canada a 1–3. With that, Japan became only a group third. However, since after the increase of the field of participants only all group winners and second came in the knockout round, Japan retired as second best group third.

=== Group C ===
Pos	Team	Pld	W	D	L	GF	GA	GD	Pts	Qualification
1	Germany	3	3	0	0	13	2	+11	9	Advance to knockout stage
2	Canada	3	2	0	1	7	5	+2	6	Advance to knockout stage
3	Japan	3	1	0	2	7	6	+1	3	
4	Argentina	3	0	0	3	1	15	−14	0	

Source: FIFA
September 20, 2003
20:30 EDT (UTC−4)

Japan	6–0	Argentina
Sawa 13', 38'; Yamamoto 64'; Otani 72', 75', 80'	Report

Columbus Crew Stadium, Columbus
Attendance: 16,409
Referee: Katriina Elovirta (Finland)

September 24, 2003
17:45 EDT (UTC−4)

Germany	3–0	Japan
Minnert 23'; Prinz 36', 66'	Report

Columbus Crew Stadium, Columbus
Attendance: 15,529
Referee: Sueli Tortura (Brazil)

September 27, 2003
15:30 EDT (UTC−4)

Canada	3–1	Japan
Latham 36'; Sinclair 49'; Lang 72'	Report	Sawa 20'

Gillette Stadium, Foxborough
Attendance: 14,356
Referee: Im Eun-ju (South Korea)

== 2007 World Cup ==
Four years later, Japan had to go through the playoffs. At 2006 AFC Women's Asian Cup in Australia, which has been part of the Asian Association since 2006, only fourth place was taken. After three wins in the preliminary round against the People's Republic of China, the Republic of China and Vietnam became the semi-final against hosts Australia 0-2 and also the game for place 3 against North Korea 2: 3 lost. Again Mexico were in the playoffs of the opponents and this time Japan had first home right. In Tokyo, a 2-0 was submitted, so that the 1: 2 could be dealt a week later in Toluca.

In China, as four years earlier, Argentina and Germany were the group opponents, as well as for the first time England, against which in the first game a 2: 2 was achieved. After a 1–0 win over Argentina, Japan and defending champions Germany had both four points ahead of the final group game, ahead of England, who had drawn twice. However, as Japan lost 2–0 to Germany, while England beat Argentina 6–1, Germany became the group winners and then again World Champions and England ahead of Japan's runners-up, who eliminated them.

=== Group A ===
Pos	Team	Pld	W	D	L	GF	GA	GD	Pts	Qualification
1	Germany	3	2	1	0	13	0	+13	7	Advance to knockout stage
2	England	3	1	2	0	8	3	+5	5	Advance to knockout stage
3	Japan	3	1	1	1	3	4	−1	4	
4	Argentina	3	0	0	3	1	18	−17	0	

Source: FIFA
11 September 2007
20:00

Japan	2–2	England
Miyama 55', 90+5'	Report	K. Smith 81', 83'

Hongkou Football Stadium, Shanghai
Attendance: 27,146
Referee: Kari Seitz (United States)

14 September 2007
17:00

Argentina	0–1	Japan
	Report	Nagasato 90+1'

Hongkou Football Stadium, Shanghai
Attendance: 27,730
Referee: Dagmar Damková (Czech Republic)

17 September 2007
20:00

Germany	2–0	Japan
Prinz 21'; Lingor 87' (pen.)	Report

Yellow Dragon Stadium, Hangzhou
Attendance: 39,817
Referee: Adriana Correa (Colombia)

== 2011 World Cup ==
Lineups in Final

For the World Cup in Germany, Japan qualified again without detour. At 2010 Asian Cup, for which Japan was directly qualified, third place was taken. The preliminary round was again sovereign with three wins over North Korea, Thailand and Myanmar. In the semifinals, however, was then lost to the eventual Asian champion Australia 0–1. With a 2: 0 in the match for third place against arch-rivals China succeeded but the qualification. As the fourth-placed Asian team this time had no way to qualify for intercontinental playoffs, the first women's World Cup final without the People's Republic of China took place.

In Germany, Japan met New Zealand in the first match and won 2–1. This was followed by a 4–0 win over Mexico, with Homare Sawa scoring three goals. Thus, Japan was already qualified before the last group match for the knockout round, so that the subsequent 0–2 defeat against England could be coped. However, Japan was only second to the group and met in the quarterfinals host and defending champion Germany, who wanted to win the title for the third consecutive year the title and against whom Japan had never won before. Despite stormy attacks, the German team managed in 120 minutes but no goal, but could Karina Maruyama in the 108th minute a counterattack to 1: 0 and thus complete the first victory over Germany and reach the semi-finals of a World Cup for the first time. In the semifinals, Japan met Sweden and was already 10 minutes behind, but equalized eight minutes later. It remained until the half-time break. In the second half, the Japanese could then add two more goals and reach the final. Here they met United States, against whom they had never won before, and were again defeated again, this time by a counterattack against them. This could be compensated in the 81st minute, which gave it an extension. Again, the Japanese fell behind in the back. However, Homare Sawa was able to equalize with her fifth tournament goal, making her the tournament's top scorer three minutes from the end of extra time. Although Azusa Iwashimizu received the Red Card in injury time, it stayed that way, so Penalties had to decide on the World Cup title. As Japanese goalkeeper Ayumi Kaihori was only 170 cm tall and held two penalties for the US and also scored one while three Japanese women converted and only one failed, Japan became the first Asian side to become World Cup champions. Homare Sawa was also awarded the Golden Ball for best player and Japan for the fairest team.

=== Group B ===
Pos	Team	Pld	W	D	L	GF	GA	GD	Pts	Qualification
1	England	3	2	1	0	5	2	+3	7	Advance to knockout stage
2	Japan	3	2	0	1	6	3	+3	6	Advance to knockout stage
3	Mexico	3	0	2	1	3	7	−4	2	
4	New Zealand	3	0	1	2	4	6	−2	1	

Source: FIFA
27 June 2011
15:00

Japan	2–1	New Zealand
Nagasato 6'; Miyama 68'	Report	Hearn 12'

Ruhrstadion, Bochum
Attendance: 12,538
Referee: Kirsi Heikkinen (Finland)

1 July 2011
15:00

Japan	4–0	Mexico
Sawa 13', 39', 80'; Ohno 15'	Report

BayArena, Leverkusen
Attendance: 22,291
Referee: Christina Pedersen (Norway)

5 July 2011
18:15

England	2–0	Japan
E. White 15'; Yankey 66'	Report

Impuls Arena, Augsburg
Attendance: 20,777
Referee: Carol Anne Chenard (Canada)

=== Quarter-finals ===
9 July 2011
20:45

Germany	0–1 (a.e.t.)	Japan
	Report	Maruyama 108'

Volkswagen Arena, Wolfsburg
Attendance: 26,067
Referee: Quetzalli Alvarado (Mexico)

=== Semi-finals ===
13 July 2011
20:45

Japan	3–1	Sweden
Kawasumi 19', 64'; Sawa 60'	Report	Öqvist 10'

Waldstadion, Frankfurt
Attendance: 45,434
Referee: Carol Anne Chenard (Canada)

=== Final ===
17 July 2011
20:45

Japan	2–2 (a.e.t.)	United States
Miyama 81'; Sawa 117'	Report	Morgan 69'; Wambach 104'
Penalties
Miyama (penalty scored); Nagasato (penalty missed); Sakaguchi (penalty scored); Kumagai (penalty scored)	3–1	(penalty missed) Boxx; (penalty missed) Lloyd; (penalty missed) Heath; (penalty scored) Wambach

Waldstadion, Frankfurt
Attendance: 48,817
Referee: Bibiana Steinhaus (Germany)

== 2015 World Cup ==
Qualification, which was again hosted by Asian Cup, Japan was the first Asian champion. In the preliminary round were clearly beaten after a draw against Australia, Vietnam and Jordan (4: 0 and 7: 0). In the semifinals, Japan won 2–1 after extra time against the People's Republic of China and won 1–0 in the final.

When the groups were drawn, Japan was set and was defined as group head of group C. The Japanese have been awarded the three World Cup newcomers Switzerland, Cameroon and Ecuador which Japan had not played before.

Japan could won all three group matches for the first time and moved in as a group winners in the quarterfinals. The goals were all in the first half hour and then the Japanese were content to largely manage the result. Also in the last sixteen against the Netherlands they went early in the lead, but then put in the second half still a goal. In injury time, they still conceded the goal, but this time brought the result over time. Against Australia – against which they had become Asia champions 1-0 for the first time Asian champions - they had to wait but then until the 87th minute before then the winning goal and thus the second semi-final entry succeeded. There they met England, against which four years earlier in the preliminary round last time a World Cup match was lost and never won. In a balanced game, both were awarded a penalty, which they could transform. Thereafter, the mutual efforts to achieve the winning goal were fruitless. Only in stoppage time did the Laura Bassett make an own goal, which allowed her to make her final rerun of 2011. In the final, the Japanese fell behind with 0: 2 already after five minutes, after 16 minutes it was 0: 4, so the game was almost decided. Although the Japanese managed to make tactical changes and substitutions of two players before the break, and a a. Record national player Homare Sawa the 1: 4. When shortly after the break, the United States gave the Japanese an own goal, came up briefly hope again, but already two minutes later fell to the 2: 5-final. Thus, Japan could not imitate the German team and not defend the title. Aya Miyama was awarded the bronze ball as the third best player.

=== Group C ===
Pos	Team	Pld	W	D	L	GF	GA	GD	Pts	Qualification
1	Japan	3	3	0	0	4	1	+3	9	Advance to knockout stage
2	Cameroon	3	2	0	1	9	3	+6	6	Advance to knockout stage
3	Switzerland	3	1	0	2	11	4	+7	3	Advance to knockout stage
4	Ecuador	3	0	0	3	1	17	−16	0	

Source: FIFA
8 June 2015
19:00 PDT (UTC−7)

Japan	1–0	Switzerland
Miyama 29' (pen.)	Report

BC Place, Vancouver
Attendance: 25,942
Referee: Lucila Venegas (Mexico)

12 June 2015
19:00 PDT (UTC−7)

Japan	2–1	Cameroon
Sameshima 6'; Sugasawa 17'	Report	Nchout 90'

BC Place, Vancouver
Attendance: 31,441
Referee: Pernilla Larsson (Sweden)

16 June 2015
16:00 CDT (UTC−5)

Ecuador	0–1	Japan
	Report	Ōgimi 5'

Investors Group Field, Winnipeg
Attendance: 14,522
Referee: Melissa Borjas (Honduras)

=== Round of 16 ===
23 June 2015
19:00 PDT (UTC−7)

Japan	2–1	Netherlands
Ariyoshi 10'; Sakaguchi 78'	Report	Van de Ven 90+2'

BC Place, Vancouver
Attendance: 28,717
Referee: Lucila Venegas (Mexico)

=== Quarter-finals ===
27 June 2015
14:00 MDT (UTC−6)

Australia	0–1	Japan
	Report	Iwabuchi 87'

Commonwealth Stadium, Edmonton
Attendance: 19,814
Referee: Kateryna Monzul (Ukraine)

=== Semi-finals ===
1 July 2015
17:00 MDT (UTC−6)

Japan	2–1	England
Miyama 33' (pen.); Bassett 90+2' (o.g.)	Report	Williams 40' (pen.)

Commonwealth Stadium, Edmonton
Attendance: 31,467
Referee: Anna-Marie Keighley (New Zealand)

=== Final ===
5 July 2015
16:00 PDT (UTC−7)

United States	5–2	Japan
Lloyd 3', 5', 16'; Holiday 14'; Heath 54'	Report	Ōgimi 27'; Johnston 52' (o.g.)

BC Place, Vancouver
Attendance: 53,341
Referee: Kateryna Monzul (Ukraine)

== 2019 World Cup ==
In the Qualification for the World Cup in France, for which Asian women were again given five starting positions, Japan qualified by reaching the semi-finals of the 2018 AFC Women's Asian Cup. For this championship, which takes place in April 2018 in Jordan, Japan was automatically qualified. In the first game against Vietnam, a 4-0 was achieved, the second game against South Korea ended goalless. In the decisive third group match against Australia, which also drew 0–0 against South Korea but won 8–0 against Vietnam, Japan were 1-0 ahead after 63 minutes and would have been group winners in that event. However, four minutes before the end of the game, Sam Kerr scored the 1–1 draw for Australia, and as they stayed 4–0 in South Korea's parallel with Vietnam, Japan were second in the Asian Cup semi-finals also reached the World Cup finals. In the semifinals, Japan defeated China 3-1 and defended their title 1–0 in the final against Australia.

At the World Cup, the Japanese, as in 2007, met Argentina and England, and for the first time in a World Cup match, the World Cup newcomer Scotland. The Japanese started with a disappointing goalless draw against Argentina, the first time they could win a championship point. Against Scotland they increased and won 2–1. Against England they had few chances to score and lost 0–2. As Argentina and Scotland drew in a draw, it was enough for the second group place, which they met in the second round of the European Championship Netherlands. The Japanese were already in the 17th minute after a corner in the back, but could then make the game but balanced and became more dominant with increasing time, but needed until the 43rd Minute equalizer. In the second half, they were the better team, but could not use their scoring chances. When the teams were already prepared for an extension, there was a penalty in the final minute for the Dutch women, they used to victory goal. Thus, the Japanese eliminated as the last Asian team, which is the first time no Asian team in the quarter-finals, as previously Australia and China have lost their first knockout round games against European teams and South Korea and Thailand have already eliminated in the group stage.

=== Group D ===
Pos	Team	Pld	W	D	L	GF	GA	GD	Pts	Qualification
1	England	3	3	0	0	5	1	+4	9	Advance to knockout stage
2	Japan	3	1	1	1	2	3	−1	4	Advance to knockout stage
3	Argentina	3	0	2	1	3	4	−1	2	
4	Scotland	3	0	1	2	5	7	−2	1	

Source: FIFA
10 June 2019
18:00

Argentina	0–0	Japan
	Report

Parc des Princes, Paris
Attendance: 25,055
Referee: Stéphanie Frappart (France)

14 June 2019
15:00

Japan	2–1	Scotland
Iwabuchi 23'; Sugasawa 37' (pen.)	Report	Clelland 88'

Roazhon Park, Rennes
Attendance: 13,201
Referee: Lidya Tafesse (Ethiopia)

19 June 2019
21:00

Japan	0–2	England
	Report	White 14', 84'

Allianz Riviera, Nice
Attendance: 14,319
Referee: Claudia Umpiérrez (Uruguay)

=== Round of 16 ===
25 June 2019
21:00

Netherlands	2–1	Japan
Martens 17', 90' (pen.)	Report	Hasegawa 43'

Roazhon Park, Rennes
Attendance: 21,076
Referee: Melissa Borjas (Honduras)

== 2023 World Cup ==
=== Group C ===
Pos	Team	Pld	W	D	L	GF	GA	GD	Pts	Qualification
1	Japan	3	3	0	0	11	0	+11	9	Advance to knockout stage
2	Spain	3	2	0	1	8	4	+4	6	Advance to knockout stage
3	Zambia	3	1	0	2	3	11	−8	3	
4	Costa Rica	3	0	0	3	1	8	−7	0	

Source: FIFA
22 July 2023
19:00 UTC+12

Zambia	0–5	Japan
	Report	Miyazawa 43', 62'; Mi. Tanaka 55'; Endō 71'; Ueki 90+11' (pen.)

Waikato Stadium, Hamilton
Attendance: 16,111
Referee: Tess Olofsson (Sweden)

26 July 2023
17:00 UTC+12

Japan	2–0	Costa Rica
Naomoto 25'; Fujino 27'	Report

Forsyth Barr Stadium, Dunedin
Attendance: 6,992
Referee: Maria Sole Ferrieri Caputi (Italy)

31 July 2023
19:00 UTC+12

Japan	4–0	Spain
Miyazawa 12', 40'; Ueki 29'; Mi. Tanaka 82'	Report

Wellington Regional Stadium, Wellington
Attendance: 20,957
Referee: Ekaterina Koroleva (United States)

=== Round of 16 ===
5 August 2023
20:00 UTC+12

Japan	3–1	Norway
Syrstad Engen 15' (o.g.); Shimizu 50'; Miyazawa 81'	Report	Reiten 20'

Wellington Regional Stadium, Wellington
Attendance: 33,042
Referee: Edina Alves Batista (Brazil)

=== Quarter-finals ===
11 August 2023
19:30 UTC+12

Japan	1–2	Sweden
Hayashi 87'	Report	Ilestedt 32'; Angeldahl 51' (pen.)

Eden Park, Auckland
Attendance: 43,217
Referee: Esther Staubli (Switzerland)

== 2027 World Cup ==
To be confirmed.

== FIFA World Cup record ==
FIFA Women's World Cup record
Year	Result	Pld	W	D*	L	GF	GA	GD
(China) 1991	Group stage	3	0	0	3	0	12	−12
(Sweden) 1995	Quarter-finals	4	1	0	3	2	8	−6
(United States) 1999	Group stage	3	0	1	2	1	10	−9
(United States) 2003	Group stage	3	1	0	2	7	6	+1
(China) 2007	Group stage	3	1	1	1	3	4	−1
(Germany) 2011	Champions	6	4	1	1	12	6	+6
(Canada) 2015	Runners-up	7	6	0	1	11	8	+3
(France) 2019	Round of 16	4	1	1	2	3	5	−2
(Australia) (New Zealand) 2023	Quarter-finals	5	4	0	1	15	3	+12
(Brazil) 2027	Qualified							
(Costa Rica) (Jamaica) (Mexico) (United States) 2031	To be determined							
(United Kingdom) 2035	To be determined							
Total	10/10	38	18	4	16	54	62	−8

*Draws include knockout matches decided via penalty shoot-out.

FIFA Women's World Cup history
Year	Round	Date	Opponent	Result	Stadium
(China) 1991	Group stage	17 November	Brazil	L 0–1	New Plaza Stadium, Foshan
(China) 1991	Group stage	19 November	Sweden	L 0–8	New Plaza Stadium, Foshan
(China) 1991	Group stage	21 November	United States	L 0–3	New Plaza Stadium, Foshan
(Sweden) 1995	Group stage	5 June	Germany	L 0–1	Tingvallen, Karlstad
(Sweden) 1995	Group stage	7 June	Brazil	W 2–1	Tingvallen, Karlstad
(Sweden) 1995	Group stage	9 June	Sweden	L 0–2	Arosvallen, Västerås
(Sweden) 1995	Quarter-finals	13 June	United States	L 0–4	Strömvallen, Gävle
(United States) 1999	Group stage	19 June	Canada	D 1–1	Spartan Stadium, San Jose
(United States) 1999	Group stage	23 June	Russia	L 0–5	Civic Stadium, Portland
(United States) 1999	Group stage	26 June	Norway	L 0–4	Soldier Field, Chicago
(United States) 2003	Group stage	20 September	Argentina	W 6–0	Columbus Crew Stadium, Columbus
(United States) 2003	Group stage	24 September	Germany	L 0–3	Columbus Crew Stadium, Columbus
(United States) 2003	Group stage	27 September	Canada	L 1–3	Gillette Stadium, Foxborough
(China) 2007	Group stage	11 September	England	D 2–2	Hongkou Stadium, Shanghai
(China) 2007	Group stage	14 September	Argentina	W 1–0	Hongkou Stadium, Shanghai
(China) 2007	Group stage	17 September	Germany	L 0–2	Yellow Dragon Sports Center, Hangzhou
(Germany) 2011	Group stage	27 June	New Zealand	W 2–1	Ruhrstadion, Bochum
(Germany) 2011	Group stage	1 July	Mexico	W 4–0	BayArena, Leverkusen
(Germany) 2011	Group stage	5 July	England	L 0–2	Impuls Arena, Augsburg
(Germany) 2011	Quarter-finals	9 July	Germany	W 1–0	Volkswagen-Arena, Wolfsburg
(Germany) 2011	Semi-finals	13 July	Sweden	W 3–1	Commerzbank-Arena, Frankfurt
(Germany) 2011	Final	17 July	United States	D 2–2 (3–1 (p))	Commerzbank-Arena, Frankfurt
(Canada) 2015	Group stage	8 June	Switzerland	W 1–0	BC Place, Vancouver
(Canada) 2015	Group stage	12 June	Cameroon	W 2–1	BC Place, Vancouver
(Canada) 2015	Group stage	16 June	Ecuador	W 1–0	Winnipeg Stadium, Winnipeg
(Canada) 2015	Round of 16	23 June	Netherlands	W 2–1	BC Place, Vancouver
(Canada) 2015	Quarter-finals	27 June	Australia	W 1–0	Commonwealth Stadium, Edmonton
(Canada) 2015	Semi-finals	1 July	England	W 2–1	Commonwealth Stadium, Edmonton
(Canada) 2015	Final	5 July	United States	L 2–5	BC Place, Vancouver
(France) 2019	Group stage	10 June	Argentina	D 0–0	Parc des Princes, Paris
(France) 2019	Group stage	14 June	Scotland	W 2–1	Roazhon Park, Rennes
(France) 2019	Group stage	19 June	England	L 0–2	Allianz Riviera, Nice
(France) 2019	Round of 16	25 June	Netherlands	L 1–2	Roazhon Park, Rennes
(Australia) (New Zealand) 2023	Group stage	22 July	Zambia	W 5–0	Waikato Stadium, Hamilton
(Australia) (New Zealand) 2023	Group stage	26 July	Costa Rica	W 2–0	Forsyth Barr Stadium, Dunedin
(Australia) (New Zealand) 2023	Group stage	31 July	Spain	W 4–0	Wellington Regional Stadium, Wellington
(Australia) (New Zealand) 2023	Round of 16	5 August	Norway	W 3–1	Wellington Regional Stadium, Wellington
(Australia) (New Zealand) 2023	Quarter-finals	11 August	Sweden	L 1–2	Eden Park, Auckland
(Brazil) 2027	Group stage				

== Head-to-head record ==
Opponent	Pld	W	D	L	GF	GA	GD	Win %
Argentina	3	2	1	0	7	0	+7	66.67
Australia	1	1	0	0	1	0	+1	100.00
Brazil	2	1	0	1	2	2	+0	50.00
Cameroon	1	1	0	0	2	1	+1	100.00
Canada	2	0	1	1	2	4	−2	0.00
Costa Rica	1	1	0	0	2	0	+2	100.00
Ecuador	1	1	0	0	1	0	+1	100.00
England	4	1	1	2	4	7	−3	25.00
Germany	4	1	0	3	1	6	−5	25.00
Mexico	1	1	0	0	4	0	+4	100.00
Netherlands	2	1	0	1	3	3	+0	50.00
New Zealand	1	1	0	0	2	1	+1	100.00
Norway	2	1	0	1	3	5	−2	50.00
Russia	1	0	0	1	0	5	−5	0.00
Scotland	1	1	0	0	2	1	+1	100.00
Spain	1	1	0	0	4	0	+4	100.00
Sweden	4	1	0	3	4	13	−9	25.00
Switzerland	1	1	0	0	1	0	+1	100.00
United States	4	0	1	3	4	14	−10	0.00
Zambia	1	1	0	0	5	0	+5	100.00
Total	38	18	4	16	54	62	−8	47.37

== Goalscorers ==
Player	Goals	1991	1995	1999	2003	2007	2011	2015	2019	2023	2027
Homare Sawa	8				3		5				
Aya Miyama	6					2	2	2			
Hinata Miyazawa	5									5	
Yūki Ōgimi	4					1	1	2			
Mio Otani	3				3						
Nahomi Kawasumi	2						2				
Akemi Noda	2		2								
Mana Iwabuchi	2							1	1		
Yuika Sugasawa	2							1	1		
Mina Tanaka	2									2	
Riko Ueki	2									2	
Yui Hasegawa	1								1		
Saori Ariyoshi	1							1			
Karina Maruyama	1						1				
Shinobu Ohno	1						1				
Nami Otake	1			1							
Mizuho Sakaguchi	1							1			
Aya Sameshima	1							1			
Emi Yamamoto	1				1						
Jun Endō	1									1	
Hikaru Naomoto	1									1	
Aoba Fujino	1									1	
Risa Shimizu	1									1	
Honoka Hayashi	1									1	
Own goals	3							2		1	
Total	54	0	2	1	7	3	12	11	3	15	

Own goals scored for opponents

- Sayuri Yamaguchi (scored for Sweden in 1991)
- Hiromi Isozaki (scored for Norway in 1999)
