= 1991 South American Women's Football Championship =

Campeonato Sul-Americano de Futebol Feminino de 1991

Tournament details
- Host country: Brazil
- Dates: 28 April – 5 May
- Teams: 3 (from 1 confederation)
- Venue: 1 (in 1 host city)

Final positions
- Champions: Brazil (1st title)
- Runners-up: Chile
- Third place: Venezuela

Tournament statistics
- Matches played: 3
- Goals scored: 14 (4.67 per match)
- Top scorer: (Brazil) Adriana (4 goals)
- Best player: (Chile) Ada Cruz

The 1991 South American Women's Football Championship (Campeonato Sudamericano de Fútbol Femenino 1991) was held in Maringá, Brazil between 28 April and 5 May 1991. It was the first staging of the South American Women's Football Championship and determined the CONMEBOL's single qualifier for the 1991 FIFA Women's World Cup.

Brazil won the tournament, that was played with only three teams: Brazil, Chile and Venezuela. Adriana was the tournament's top scorer, with four goals. Chile's Ada Cruz was elected as the best player.

In 1988, the Venezuelan Football Federation (FVF) had expressed interest in hosting the tournament.

== Venues ==
The only venue used for the tournament was the Estádio Willie Davids, located in Maringá.

Maringá
Estádio Willie Davids
Capacity: 16.226
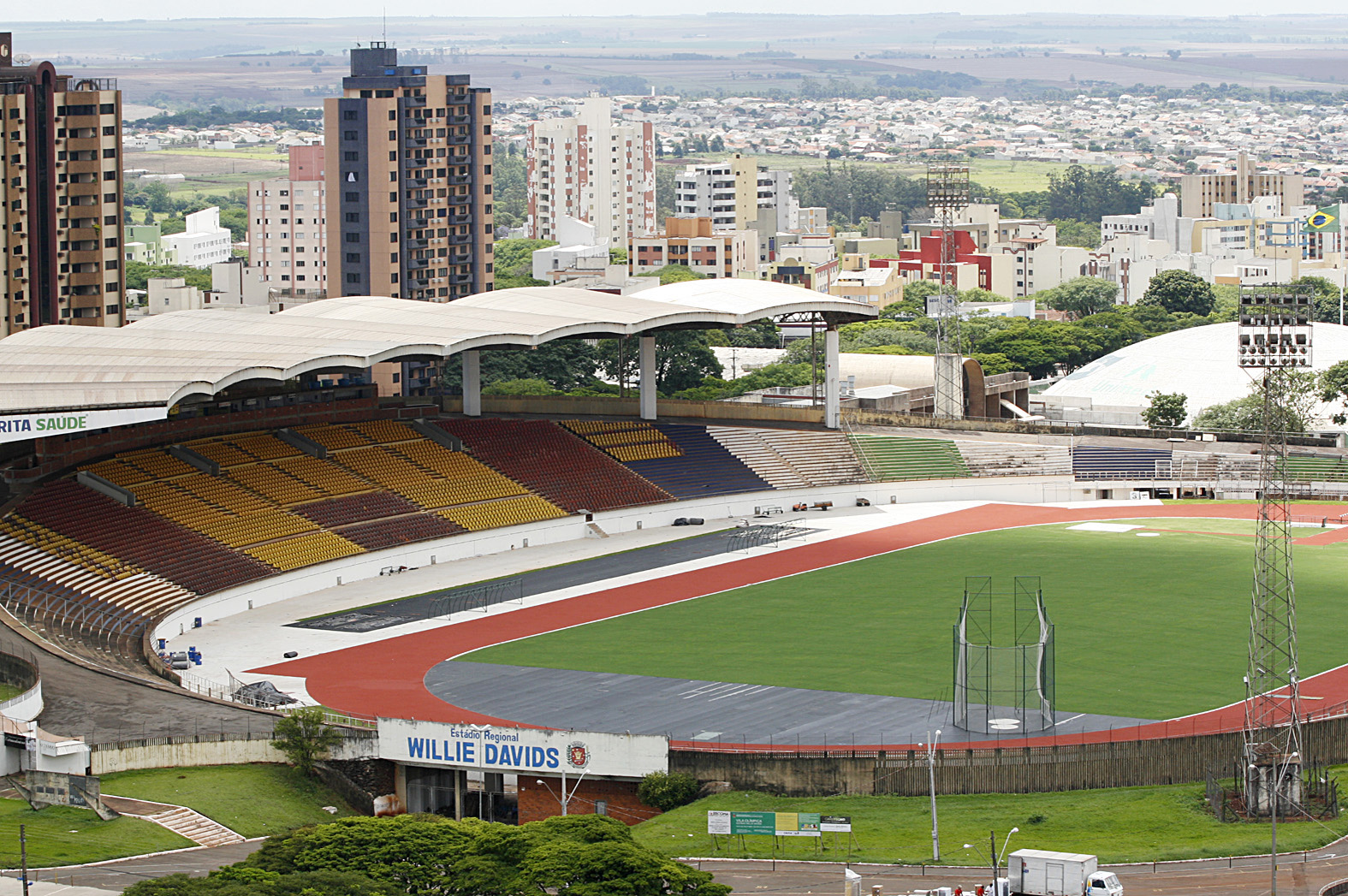

== Results ==
The tournament was set up in a round-robin format, where each team played one match against each of the other teams within the group. The first placed team in the group won the tournament and qualified for the 1991 FIFA Women's World Cup in China.

Two points were awarded for a win, one point for a draw, and no points for a loss.

- Tie-breaker
  - If teams finish leveled on points, the following tie-breakers are used:
  1. greater goal difference in all group games;
  2. greater number of goals scored in all group games;
  3. winner of the head-to-head match between the teams in question;
  4. drawing of lots.

=== Final standings ===
Team	Pld	W	D	L	GF	GA	GD	Pts
Brazil	2	2	0	0	12	1	+11	4
Chile	2	1	0	1	2	6	–4	2
Venezuela	2	0	0	2	0	7	–7	0

28 April 1991

Brazil	6–1	Chile
Roseli (?); Adriana (?); Márcia Taffarel (?); Elane (?); Marisa (?)	Report	Cruz (?)

Estádio Willie Davids, Maringá

1 May 1991

Chile	1–0	Venezuela

Estádio Willie Davids, Maringá

5 May 1991

Brazil	6–0	Venezuela

Estádio Willie Davids, Maringá

Brazil won the tournament and qualified for the 1991 FIFA Women's World Cup.

== Awards ==
1991 South American Women's Football Championship winners

Brazil
First title

== Goalscorers ==
4 goals

- (Brazil) Adriana

1 goal

- (Brazil) Elane
- (Brazil) Márcia Taffarel
- (Brazil) Marisa
- (Brazil) Roseli
- (Chile) Ada Cruz

Unknown goalscorers

- Brazil: 4 additional goals
- Chile: 1 additional goal
