= List of managers at the FIFA Women's World Cup =

FIFA Women's World Cup Coaches

This is a list of all managers who have appeared in the FIFA Women's World Cup, the most prestigious tournament for national teams in association football.

In total, over 100 individuals have managed a team in at least one match in the World Cup. Even Pellerud is the manager who has taken part in the most editions of the tournament, five from 1991 to 2015. Pellerud also holds the records for both most matches managed (25) and most matches won (16).

Eight managers have won the World Cup, with Jill Ellis being the only one to do so twice, in 2015 and 2019 with United States. The first person who had the roles of both a player and a manager in the tournament is April Heinrichs, who played for United States in 1991 and then coached them in 2003.

The youngest manager to appear in the competition is Vanessa Arauz, who managed Ecuador at age 26 in 2015, while the oldest is Mai Đức Chung, who was in charge of Vietnam at age 72 in 2023.

While many of the participating nations have on one or more occasions employed foreign managers for the World Cup, the three teams with the most appearances, Germany, Japan, and Sweden have always been led by natives. On the other side of the spectrum, New Zealand is the team with the most participations always coached by foreigners – five, always with managers coming from United Kingdom.

== By team ==
The teams are listed in decreasing order of number of appearances in the World Cup.

=== Brazil ===
Year	Manager
1991	(Brazil) Fernando Pires
1995	(Brazil) Ademar Fonseca
1999	(Brazil) Wilsinho
2003	(Brazil) Paulo Gonçalves
2007	(Brazil) Jorge Barcellos
2011	(Brazil) Kleiton Lima
2015	(Brazil) Vadão
2019	(Brazil) Vadão
2023	(Sweden) Pia Sundhage

=== Germany ===
Year	Manager
1991	(Germany) Gero Bisanz
1995	(Germany) Gero Bisanz
1999	(Germany) Tina Theune-Meyer
2003	(Germany) Tina Theune-Meyer
2007	(Germany) Silvia Neid
2011	(Germany) Silvia Neid
2015	(Germany) Silvia Neid
2019	(Germany) Martina Voss-Tecklenburg
2023	(Germany) Martina Voss-Tecklenburg

=== Japan ===
Year	Manager
1991	(Japan) Tamotsu Suzuki
1995	(Japan) Tamotsu Suzuki
1999	(Japan) Satoshi Miyauchi
2003	(Japan) Eiji Ueda
2007	(Japan) Hiroshi Ohashi
2011	(Japan) Norio Sasaki
2015	(Japan) Norio Sasaki
2019	(Japan) Asako Takakura
2023	(Japan) Futoshi Ikeda

=== Nigeria ===
Year	Manager
1991	(Netherlands) Jo Bonfrère
1995	(Nigeria) Paul Hamilton
1999	(Nigeria) Mabo Ismaila
2003	(Nigeria) Samuel Okpodu
2007	(Nigeria) Ntiero Effiom
2011	(Nigeria) Ngozi Eucharia Uche
2015	(Nigeria) Edwin Okon
2019	(Sweden) Thomas Dennerby
2023	(United States) Randy Waldrum

=== Norway ===
Year	Manager
1991	(Norway) Even Pellerud
1995	(Norway) Even Pellerud
1999	(Norway) Per-Mathias Høgmo
2003	(Norway) Åge Steen
2007	(Norway) Bjarne Berntsen
2011	(Norway) Eli Landsem
2015	(Norway) Even Pellerud
2019	(Sweden) Martin Sjögren
2023	(Norway) Hege Riise

=== Sweden ===
Year	Manager
1991	(Sweden) Gunilla Paijkull
1995	(Sweden) Bengt Simonsson
1999	(Sweden) Marika Domanski-Lyfors
2003	(Sweden) Marika Domanski-Lyfors
2007	(Sweden) Thomas Dennerby
2011	(Sweden) Thomas Dennerby
2015	(Sweden) Pia Sundhage
2019	(Sweden) Peter Gerhardsson
2023	(Sweden) Peter Gerhardsson

=== United States ===
Year	Manager
1991	(United States) Anson Dorrance
1995	(United States) Tony DiCicco
1999	(United States) Tony DiCicco
2003	(United States) April Heinrichs
2007	(United States) Greg Ryan
2011	(Sweden) Pia Sundhage
2015	(England) (United States) Jill Ellis
2019	(England) (United States) Jill Ellis
2023	(North Macedonia) Vlatko Andonovski

=== Australia ===
Year	Manager
1995	(Scotland) Tom Sermanni
1999	(Australia) Greg Brown
2003	(Australia) Adrian Santrac
2007	(Scotland) Tom Sermanni
2011	(Scotland) Tom Sermanni
2015	(Australia) Alen Stajcic
2019	(Australia) Ante Milicic
2023	(Sweden) Tony Gustavsson

=== Canada ===
Year	Manager
1995	(Canada) Sylvie Béliveau
1999	(England) Neil Turnbull
2003	(Norway) Even Pellerud
2007	(Norway) Even Pellerud
2011	(Italy) Carolina Morace
2015	(England) John Herdman
2019	(Denmark) Kenneth Heiner-Møller
2023	(England) Bev Priestman

=== China PR ===
Year	Manager
1991	(China) Shang Ruihua
1995	(China) Ma Yuanan
1999	(China) Ma Yuanan
2003	(China) Ma Liangxing
2007	(Sweden) Marika Domanski-Lyfors
2015	(China) Hao Wei
2019	(China) Jia Xiuquan
2023	(China) Shui Qingxia

=== England ===
Year	Manager
1995	(England) Ted Copeland
2007	(England) Hope Powell
2011	(England) Hope Powell
2015	(Wales) Mark Sampson
2019	(England) Phil Neville
2023	(Netherlands) Sarina Wiegman

=== New Zealand ===
Year	Manager
1991	(England) Dave Boardman
2007	(England) John Herdman
2011	(England) John Herdman
2015	(England) Tony Readings
2019	(Scotland) Tom Sermanni
2023	(Czech Republic) Jitka Klimková

=== Denmark ===
Year	Manager
1991	(Denmark) Keld Gantzhorn
1995	(Denmark) Keld Gantzhorn
1999	(Denmark) Jørgen Hvidemose
2007	(Denmark) Kenneth Heiner-Møller
2023	(Denmark) Lars Søndergaard

=== France ===
Year	Manager
2003	(France) Élisabeth Loisel
2011	(France) Bruno Bini
2015	(France) Philippe Bergeroo
2019	(France) Corinne Diacre
2023	(France) Hervé Renard

=== Argentina ===
Year	Manager
2003	(Argentina) Carlos Borrello
2007	(Argentina) Carlos Borrello
2019	(Argentina) Carlos Borrello
2023	(Argentina) Germán Portanova

=== Italy ===
Year	Manager
1991	(Italy) Sergio Guenza
1999	(Italy) Carlo Facchin
2019	(Italy) Milena Bertolini
2023	(Italy) Milena Bertolini

=== North Korea ===
Year	Manager
1999	(North Korea) Myong Dong-chan
2003	(North Korea) Ri Song-gun
2007	(North Korea) Kim Kwang-min
2011	(North Korea) Kim Kwang-min

=== South Korea ===
Year	Manager
2003	(South Korea) An Jong-goan
2015	(South Korea) Yoon Deok-yeo
2019	(South Korea) Yoon Deok-yeo
2023	(England) Colin Bell

=== Colombia ===
Year	Manager
2011	(Colombia) Ricardo Rozo
2015	(Colombia) Fabián Taborda
2023	(Colombia) Nelson Abadía

=== Ghana ===
Year	Manager
1999	(Ghana) Emmanuel Kwasi Afranie
2003	(Ghana) Oko Aryee
2007	(Ghana) Isaac Paha

=== Mexico ===
Year	Manager
1999	(Mexico) Leonardo Cuéllar
2011	(Mexico) Leonardo Cuéllar
2015	(Mexico) Leonardo Cuéllar

=== Netherlands ===
Year	Manager
2015	(Netherlands) Roger Reijners
2019	(Netherlands) Sarina Wiegman
2023	(Netherlands) Andries Jonker

=== Spain ===
Year	Manager
2015	(Spain) Ignacio Quereda
2019	(Spain) Jorge Vilda
2023	(Spain) Jorge Vilda

=== Cameroon ===
Year	Manager
2015	(Cameroon) Carl Enow
2019	(Cameroon) Alain Djeumfa

=== Costa Rica ===
Year	Manager
2015	(Costa Rica) Amelia Valverde
2023	(Costa Rica) Amelia Valverde

=== Jamaica ===
Year	Manager
2019	(United States) (Jamaica) Hue Menzies
2023	(Jamaica) Lorne Donaldson

=== Russia ===
Year	Manager
1999	(Russia) Yuri Bystritsky
2003	(Russia) Yuri Bystritsky

=== South Africa ===
Year	Manager
2019	(South Africa) Desiree Ellis
2023	(South Africa) Desiree Ellis

=== Switzerland ===
Year	Manager
2015	(Germany) Martina Voss-Tecklenburg
2023	(Germany) Inka Grings

=== Thailand ===
Year	Manager
2015	(Thailand) Nuengrutai Srathongvian
2019	(Thailand) Nuengrutai Srathongvian

=== Chile ===
Year	Manager
2019	(Chile) José Letelier

=== Chinese Taipei ===
Year	Manager
1991	(Taiwan) Chong Tsu-pin

=== Ecuador ===
Year	Manager
2015	(Ecuador) Vanessa Arauz

=== Equatorial Guinea ===
Year	Manager
2011	(Italy) Marcello Frigério

=== Haiti ===
Year	Manager
2023	(France) Nicolas Delépine

=== Ivory Coast ===
Year	Manager
2015	(Ivory Coast) Clémentine Touré

=== Morocco ===
Year	Manager
2023	(France) Reynald Pedros

=== Panama ===
Year	Manager
2023	(Mexico) Ignacio Quintana

=== Philippines ===
Year	Manager
2023	(Australia) Alen Stajcic

=== Portugal ===
Year	Manager
2023	(Portugal) Francisco Neto

=== Republic of Ireland ===
Year	Manager
2023	(Netherlands) Vera Pauw

=== Scotland ===
Year	Manager
2019	(Scotland) Shelley Kerr

=== Vietnam ===
Year	Manager
2023	(Vietnam) Mai Đức Chung

=== Zambia ===
Year	Manager
2023	(Zambia) Bruce Mwape

== By individual (multiple tournaments) ==
Key: T – tournaments appeared in; N – different nations managed; M – matches; W – wins; D – draws; L – losses.

As per statistical convention in football, matches decided in extra time are counted as wins and losses, while matches decided by penalty shoot-outs are counted as draws.

Manager	Nationality	T	N	M	W	D	L	Editions and teams
Even Pellerud	Norway	5	2	25	16	2	7	1991 NOR, 1995 NOR, 2003 CAN, 2007 CAN, 2015 NOR
Tom Sermanni	Scotland	4	2	14	3	2	9	1995 AUS, 2007 AUS, 2011 AUS, 2019 NZL
Marika Domanski-Lyfors	Sweden	3	2	14	8	0	6	1999 SWE, 2003 SWE, 2007 CHN
Leonardo Cuéllar	Mexico	3	1	9	0	1	6	1999 MEX, 2011 MEX, 2015 MEX
John Herdman	England	3	2	11	2	3	6	2007 NZL, 2011 NZL, 2015 CAN
Silvia Neid	Germany	3	1	17	11	3	3	2007 GER, 2011 GER, 2015 GER
Carlos Borrello	Argentina	3	1	9	0	2	7	2003 ARG, 2007 ARG, 2019 ARG
Thomas Dennerby	Sweden	3	2	12	6	1	5	2007 SWE, 2011 SWE, 2019 NGA
Pia Sundhage	Sweden	3	3	13	4	6	3	2011 USA, 2015 SWE, 2023 BRA
Martina Voss-Tecklenburg	Germany	3	2	12	6	1	5	2015 SWI, 2019 GER, 2023 GER
Gero Bisanz	Germany	2	1	12	8	0	4	1991 GER, 1995 GER
Keld Gantzhorn	Denmark	2	1	7	2	0	5	1991 DEN, 1995 DEN
Tamotsu Suzuki	Japan	2	1	7	1	0	6	1991 JPN, 1995 JPN
Tony DiCicco	United States	2	1	12	9	2	1	1995 USA, 1999 USA
Yuri Bystritsky	Russia	2	1	8	4	0	4	1999 RUS, 2003 RUS
Tina Theune-Meyer	Germany	2	1	10	7	2	1	1999 GER, 2003 GER
Kim Kwang-min	North Korea	2	1	7	1	2	4	2007 PRK, 2011 PRK
Norio Sasaki	Japan	2	1	13	10	1	2	2011 JPN, 2015 JPN
Kenneth Heiner-Møller	Denmark	2	1	7	3	0	4	2007 DEN, 2019 CAN
Jill Ellis	England; United States	2	1	14	13	1	0	2015 USA, 2019 USA
Nuengrutai Srathongvian	Thailand	2	1	6	1	0	5	2015 THA, 2019 THA
Vadão	Brazil	2	1	8	5	0	3	2015 BRA, 2019 BRA
Yoon Deok-yeo	South Korea	2	1	7	1	1	5	2015 KOR, 2019 KOR
Alen Stajcic	Australia	2	2	8	3	1	4	2015 AUS, 2023 PHI
Amelia Valverde	Costa Rica	2	1	6	0	2	4	2015 CRC, 2023 CRC
Milena Bertolini	Italy	2	1	8	4	0	4	2019 ITA, 2023 ITA
Desiree Ellis	South Africa	2	1	7	1	1	5	2019 RSA, 2023 RSA
Peter Gerhardsson	Sweden	2	1	14	10	1	3	2019 SWE, 2023 SWE
Jorge Vilda	Spain	2	1	11	7	1	3	2019 ESP, 2023 ESP
Sarina Wiegman	Netherlands	2	2	14	11	1	2	2019 NED, 2023 ENG
