= Elane =

Brazilian footballer (born 1968)

Personal information
- Full name: Elane dos Santos Rego
- Date of birth: 4 June 1968 (age 58)
- Place of birth: Rio de Janeiro, Brazil
- Height: 1.74 m (5 ft 8 1/2 in)
- Position: Central defender

Senior career*
Years	Team	Apps	(Gls)
- Radar
- Euroexport
- Uberlândia Football Club

International career^{‡}
- Brazil
- * Club domestic league appearances and goals as of 22:52, 17 April 2013 (UTC) ‡ National team caps and goals as of 22:52, 17 April 2013 (UTC)

Elane dos Santos Rego (born 4 June 1968), commonly known as Elane, is a Brazilian retired footballer who played as a central defender for the Brazil women's national football team.

She represented Brazil at the FIFA Women's World Cup in 1991, 1995 and 1999; as well as in the inaugural Olympic women's football tournament in 1996.

== Career ==
Elane was part of the EC Radar club team who represented Brazil at the 1988 FIFA Women's Invitation Tournament in Guangdong and finished in third place.

At the 1991 FIFA Women's World Cup Elane played in all three Group B games and scored Brazil's first ever World Cup goal in their 1–0 opening match win over Japan.

An aggressive central defender, Elane remained a key player for Brazil at the 1999 FIFA Women's World Cup, by which time she was playing for São Paulo FC. A tournament preview on the SoccerTimes.com website described her as a strong tackler with modest speed. At the 1995 FIFA Women's World Cup in Sweden, English journalist Pete Davies, covering the tournament for The Independent, caricatured Elane's committed approach:

At the back, they [Brazil] had a clogger named Elane who'd kick anything – waiters, bus conductors, passing dogs, no one was safe, in another game she even managed to get herself booked after the final whistle.

At club level Elane also played for São Cristóvão, Bonsucesso, Portuguesa, EC Radar, Santos, Corinthians, São Paulo and Saad Esporte Clube, ending her career in 2001 with Barra de Teresópolis (RJ).

After her football career Elane worked as a bus driver in her native Rio. She was named equal seventh (with Meg) in the International Federation of Football History & Statistics (IFFHS) South America's best Women's Footballer of the Century list.
