= The Other Sport =

2013 documentary series directed by Tomas Mattias Löw

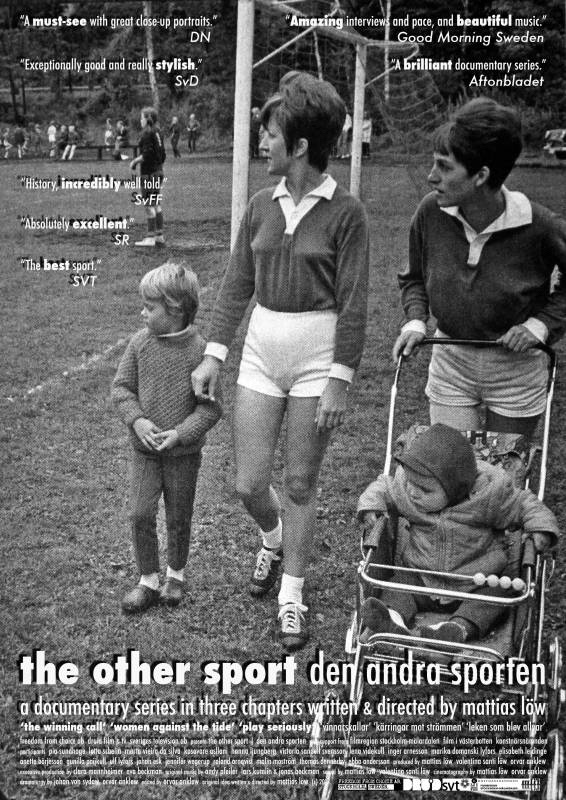
- Series Poster
- Genre: Documentary Series
- Created by: Mattias Löw
- Written by: Mattias Löw
- Directed by: Mattias Löw
- Starring: Pia Sundhage, Lotta Schelin, Kosovare Asllani, Marta, Hanna Ljungberg, Victoria Sandell Svensson, Malin Moström, Hope Solo, Lena Videkull, Anette Börjesson, Marika Domanski-Lyfors, Elisabeth Leidinge, Gunilla Paijkull, Elísabet Gunnarsdóttir, Tony Gustavsson, Stefan Rehn, Torbjörn Nilsson, Karl-Erik Nilsson, Lars-Åke Lagrell, Lennart Johansson, Thomas Dennerby
- Narrated by: Johan von Sydow
- Theme music composer: Jonas Beckman, Lars Kumlin & Andy Pfeiler
- Composers: Jonas Beckman, Lars Kumlin & Andy Pfeiler
- Country of origin: Sweden
- Original language: Swedish
- No. of seasons: 1
- No. of episodes: 3

Production
- Producers: Mattias Löw; Valentina Santi Löw; Orvar Anklew
- Cinematography: Mattias Löw; Orvar Anklew
- Editor: Orvar Anklew
- Camera setup: Mattias Löw
- Running time: 132 minutes (3 episodes x 44 minutes)
- Production companies: Sveriges Television & Freedom From Choice

Original release
- Network: Sveriges Television
- Release: 20 June – 27 June 2013

The Other Sport (Swedish: Den andra sporten) is a 2013 three-part documentary television series produced by Freedom From Choice and Sveriges Television covering this history and condition of women's football in Sweden, from the first clubs' organization in the mid-1960s to the film's present day.

The series is structured into three perspectives: from the time period of its production (The Winning Call), historical perspectives (Women Against The Tide), and as a chronological study of notable moments in Swedish women's football (Play Seriously). Subjects include the early dominance of Öxabäcks IF in the 1970s and 1980s, the importance of Umeå IK in the 2000s, Sweden winning the first UEFA Women's Championship in 1984, and the UEFA Women's Euro 2013 being played in Sweden.

The documentary series was created by Mattias Löw, Valentina Santi Löw, and Orvar Anklew, and features active and former women's footballers Marta, Lotta Schelin, Kosovare Asllani, Hope Solo, Hanna Ljungberg, Victoria Sandell Svensson, Lena Videkull, and Anette Börjesson; then-Sweden women's national football team Pia Sundhage, former national team manager Marika Domanski-Lyfors, Icelandic manager Elísabet Gunnarsdóttir of Swedish club Kristianstads DFF, and Gunilla Paijkull, the first woman to coach a national football team; former national team goalkeeper Elisabeth Leidinge; and long-time national team manager Thomas Dennerby.

== Critical reception ==
The Other Sport was selected for various international film, television, and journalism festivals, and was recognized with several nominations and awards, most notably at the New York Television Festival, Fédération Internationale Cinéma Télévision Sportifs and Palermo International Sport Film Festival. The documentary series was the curtain raiser at the ViBGYOR Film Festival in Thrissur, India.

- Swedish Radio - "Absolutely excellent."
- Dagens Nyheter, Sweden - "A must-see with great close-up portraits."
- Svenska Dagbladet, Sweden - "Exceptionally good and really stylish."
- Good Morning Sweden - "Amazing interviews and pace, and beautiful music."
- Aftonbladet, Sweden - "A brilliant documentary series."
- Sveriges Television, Sweden - "The best sport."
- Swedish Football Association - "History, incredibly well told."

== See also ==
- List of association football films
