= 1988 FIFA Women's Invitation Tournament =

- Official poster

Tournament details
- Host country: China
- Dates: 1–12 June
- Teams: 12 (from 6 confederations)

Final positions
- Champions: Norway
- Runners-up: Sweden
- Third place: Brazil
- Fourth place: China

Tournament statistics
- Matches played: 26
- Goals scored: 81 (3.12 per match)

The 1988 FIFA Women's Invitation Tournament, or International Women's Football Tournament, was organised by FIFA in China from 1 to 12 June 1988. The competition was a test to study if a global women's World Cup was feasible following the experience of non-FIFA invitational competitions such as the Mundialito (1981–88) and the Women's World Invitational Tournament (1978–87). The competition was a success and on 30 June FIFA approved the establishment of an official World Cup for 1991, which would also be held in China.

Twelve national teams took part in the competition – four from UEFA, three from AFC, two from CONCACAF and one from CONMEBOL, CAF and OFC. European champion Norway defeated Sweden 1–0 in the final to win the tournament, while Brazil clinched the bronze by beating the hosts in a penalty shootout. Australia, Canada, the Netherlands and the United States also reached the final stages.

== Venues ==
The tournament took place in 4 cities in the province of Guangdong: Guangzhou, Foshan, Jiangmen and Panyu.

== Teams ==
12 national teams participated in the tournament, all invited by FIFA.

- Africa (CAF)
  - Ivory Coast
- Asia (AFC)
  - China
  - Japan
  - Thailand
- South America (CONMEBOL)
  - Brazil
- Oceania (OFC)
  - Australia
- Europe (UEFA)
  - Czechoslovakia
  - Netherlands
  - Norway
  - Sweden
- North America, Central America & Caribbean (CONCACAF)
  - Canada
  - United States

== Group stage ==
=== Group A ===
Team	Pts	Pld	W	D	L	GF	GA
China (H)	6	3	3	0	0	11	1
Canada	3	3	1	1	1	7	3
Netherlands	3	3	1	1	1	4	2
Ivory Coast	0	3	0	0	3	1	17

(H): Hosts

The matches of China were held in Guangzhou. The rest of the matches of this group were held in Foshan.

June 1, 1988

China	2–0	Canada
Goal	Report

Guangzhou

June 1, 1988

Netherlands	3–0	Ivory Coast
Goal	Report

Foshan

June 3, 1988

China	1–0	Netherlands
Goal	Report

Guangzhou

June 3, 1988

Ivory Coast	0–6	Canada
	Report	Goal

Foshan

June 6, 1988

Netherlands	1–1	Canada
Goal	Report	Goal

Foshan

June 6, 1988

China	8–1	Ivory Coast
Goal	Report	Goal

Guangzhou

=== Group B ===
Team	Pts	Pld	W	D	L	GF	GA
Brazil	4	3	2	0	1	11	2
Norway	4	3	2	0	1	8	2
Australia	4	3	2	0	1	4	3
Thailand	0	3	0	0	3	0	16

All matches held in Jiangmen.

June 1, 1988

Norway	4–0	Thailand
Goal	Report

Jiangmen

June 1, 1988

Australia	1–0	Brazil
Goal	Report

Jiangmen

June 3, 1988

Brazil	2–1	Norway
Goal	Report	Goal

Jiangmen

June 3, 1988

Australia	3–0	Thailand
Goal	Report

Jiangmen

June 6, 1988

Norway	3–0	Australia
Goal	Report

Jiangmen

June 6, 1988

Brazil	9–0	Thailand
Goal	Report

Jiangmen

=== Group C ===
Team	Pts	Pld	W	D	L	GF	GA
Sweden	5	3	2	1	0	5	1
United States	4	3	1	2	0	6	3
Czechoslovakia	3	3	1	1	1	2	2
Japan	0	3	0	0	3	3	10

All matches held in Panyu.

June 1, 1988

United States	5–2	Japan
Goal	Report	Goal

Panyu

June 1, 1988

Sweden	1–0	Czechoslovakia
Goal	SvFF Report (in Swedish)

Panyu

June 3, 1988

Sweden	1–1	United States
Goal	SvFF Report (in Swedish)	Goal

Panyu

June 3, 1988

Czechoslovakia	2–1	Japan
Goal	Report	Goal

Panyu

June 6, 1988

United States	0–0	Czechoslovakia
	Report

Panyu

June 6, 1988

Sweden	3–0	Japan
Goal	SvFF Report (in Swedish)

Panyu

=== Ranking of third-placed teams ===
Pos	Team	Pld	W	D	L	GF	GA	GD	Pts
1	Australia	3	2	0	1	4	3	1	4
2	Netherlands	3	1	1	1	4	2	2	3
3	Czechoslovakia	3	1	1	1	2	2	0	3

== Knockout stage ==
=== Bracket ===
Quarter-finals
8 June — Guangzhou
Sweden	1
Canada	0
8 June — Guangzhou
China	7
Australia	0
8 June — Foshan
Brazil	2
Netherlands	1
8 June — Panyu
United States	0
Norway	1

Semi-finals
10 June — Panyu
Sweden	2
China	1
10 June — Guangzhou
Brazil	1
Norway	2

Final
12 June — Guangzhou
Sweden	0
Norway	1
Third place
12 June — Guangzhou
Brazil	0 (4)
China	0 (3)

=== Quarter-finals ===
8 June 1988

Sweden	1–0	Canada
Sundhage	SvFF Report (in Swedish)

Tianhe Stadium, Guangzhou

8 June 1988

China	7–0	Australia
Goal	Report

Tianhe Stadium, Guangzhou

8 June 1988

Brazil	2–1	Netherlands
Cebola; Sissi	Report	De Bakker

New Plaza Stadium, Foshan

8 June 1988

Norway	1–0	United States
Goal	Report

Ying Tung Stadium, Panyu

=== Semi-finals ===
10 June 1988

Sweden	2–1	China
Johansson; Gustafsson	SvFF Report (in Swedish)	Niu Lijie 10'

Ying Tung Stadium, Panyu

10 June 1988

Norway	2–1	Brazil
Scheel	Report	Sissi

Tianhe Stadium, Guangzhou

=== Third place play-off ===
12 June 1988

China	0–0	Brazil
	Report
Penalties
Wu Weiying (penalty scored); Niu Lijie (penalty scored); Chen Xia (penalty scored); ? (penalty missed)	3–4	(penalty scored) Roseli; (penalty missed) Fanta; (penalty scored) Pelézinha; (penalty scored) Sandra; (penalty scored) Michael

Tianhe Stadium, Guangzhou

=== Final ===
12 June 1988

Sweden	0–1	Norway
	Norway Report; Sweden Report; SvFF Report	Medalen 58'

Tianhe Stadium, Guangzhou
Attendance: 30,000 (according to Norway)
35,000 (according to Sweden)
Referee: Romualdo Arppi Filho (Brazil)

Sweden	Norway

SWEDEN:
GK	1	Elisabeth Leidinge
DF	3	Marie Karlsson
DF	4	Pia Syrén
DF	5	Eva Zeikfalvy	Substituted off
MF	6	Ingrid Johansson (c)
MF	7	Pia Sundhage
MF	9	Pärnilla Larsson
FW	11	Anneli Gustafsson
FW	13	Anneli Andelén
FW	14	Helen Johansson	Substituted off
MF	16	Gunilla Axén
Substitutes:
MF	8	Camilla Andersson	Substituted on
DF	14	Tina Nilsson	Substituted on
FW	10	Lena Videkull
GK	12	Ing-Marie Olsson
MF	17	Anette Palm
Manager:
Gunilla Paijkull

NORWAY:
GK	1	Hege Ludvigsen
DF	2	Cathrine Zaborowski
DF	3	Liv Strædet
MF	4	Bjørg Storhaug
DF	5	Gunn Nyborg
DF	6	Toril Hoch-Nielsen	Substituted off
MF	7	Tone Haugen
MF	8	Heidi Støre (c)
FW	9	Birthe Hegstad
FW	10	Ellen Scheel
FW	11	Linda Medalen	Substituted off
Substitutes:
GK	12	Reidun Seth
FW	13	Lisbeth Bakken
FW	14	Turid Storhaug	Substituted on
MF	15	Agnete Carlsen
FW	16	Sissel Grude	Substituted on
Managers:
Dag Steinar Vestlund; Erling Hokstad

== All-Star Team ==
The all star team was voted by the Chinese press.

- (Sweden) Elisabeth Leidinge
- (Norway) Liv Strædet
- (Sweden) Marie Karlsson
- (Norway) Heidi Støre
- (Sweden) Eva Zeikfalvy
- (Brazil) Roseli
- (Norway) Linda Medalen
- (United States) Carin Jennings
- (China) Sun Qingmei
- (Brazil) Cebola
- (Norway) Ellen Scheel

== See also ==
- 1991 FIFA Women's World Cup
