= Helen Johansson =

Swedish footballer (born 1965)

Personal information
- Full name: Helen Johansson
- Date of birth: 9 July 1965 (age 61)
- Position: Forward

Senior career*
Years	Team	Apps	(Gls)
- Ahlafors IF
- Jitex BK
- GAIS
- Öxabäck IF

International career^{‡}
1981–1995	Sweden	88	(23)
- * Club domestic league appearances and goals ‡ National team caps and goals as of 21:35, 2 December 2013 (UTC)

Helen Björk (born 9 July 1965, as Helen Johansson) is a Swedish former association football forward who won 88 caps and scored 23 goals for the Sweden women's national football team. She helped Sweden win the 1984 European Championship and played at the inaugural 1991 FIFA Women's World Cup.

== International career ==
Johansson made her senior Sweden debut on 26 September 1981; a 7–0 win over the Netherlands at Ryavallen in Borås. She won the first UEFA championships for national women's teams in 1984. Sweden beat England in the final, in a penalty shootout at Kenilworth Road after a 1–1 aggregate draw. She missed the first leg with myocarditis. Restored to the team for the second leg, Johansson had her shot saved by Theresa Wiseman in the shootout, but Elisabeth Leidinge stopped two English penalties.

In 1991 Johannson helped Sweden to a third-place finish at the inaugural FIFA Women's World Cup in Guangdong, China. Playing as a winger behind strikers Lena Videkull and Anneli Andelén, she featured in four of the team's six matches.

=== Matches and goals scored at World Cup & Olympic tournaments ===
Key (expand for notes on "world cup and olympic goals")
Location	Geographic location of the venue where the competition occurred
Lineup	Start – played entire match on minute (off player) – substituted on at the minute indicated, and player was substituted off at the same time off minute (on player) – substituted off at the minute indicated, and player was substituted on at the same time (c) – captain
Min	The minute in the match the goal was scored. For list that include caps, blank indicates played in the match but did not score a goal.
Assist/pass	The ball was passed by the player, which assisted in scoring the goal. This column depends on the availability and source of this information.
penalty or pk	Goal scored on penalty-kick which was awarded due to foul by opponent. (Goals scored in penalty-shoot-out, at the end of a tied match after extra-time, are not included.)
Score	The match score after the goal was scored.
Result	The final score. W – match was won L – match was lost to opponent D – match was drawn (W) – penalty-shoot-out was won after a drawn match (L) – penalty-shoot-out was lost after a drawn match
aet	The score at the end of extra-time; the match was tied at the end of 90' regulation
pso	Penalty-shoot-out score shown in parentheses; the match was tied at the end of extra-time
	Pink background color – Olympic women's football tournament
	Blue background color – FIFA women's world cup final tournament

Goal	Match	Date	Location	Opponent	Lineup	Min	Score	Result	Competition
China 1991 FIFA Women's World Cup
	1	1991-11-17	Panyu	United States	Start			2–3 L	Group match
	2	1991-11-19	Foshan	Japan	off 35' (on Svensson-Gustafsson)			8–0 W	Group match
	3	1991-11-24	Guangzhou	China	Start			1–0 W	Quarter-Final
	4	1991-11-29	Guangzhou	Germany	Start			4–0 W	3rd Place Match

=== Matches and goals scored at European Championship tournaments ===
Helen Johansson participated in four European Championship tournaments: 1984(various locations), Norway 1987, Germany 1989, and 1995(various locations). Sweden won the tournament in 1984, finished second in 1987 & 1995, and took third place in 1989. Johansson's extra time goal in the 1989 consolation match secured the third place finish for Sweden in that tournament.

Goal	Match	Date	Location	Opponent	Lineup	Min	Score	Result	Competition
1984 European Championship
	1	1984-3-1	Rome	Italy	Start			3–2 W	Semi-Final 1st Leg
	2	1984-5-27	Luton	England	Start			0–1 L (Note: The 1984 European Championship was won by Sweden on penalty kicks when both legs ended 1-0.)	Final 2nd Leg
(Norway) 1987 European Championship
	3	1987-6-11	Moss	England	on 47' (off Hultin)			3–2 W	Semi-Final
	4	1987-6-14	Oslo	Norway	off 65' (on Andelén)			1–2 L	Final
(Germany) 1989 European Championship
	5	1989-6-28	Lüdenscheid	Norway	Start			1–2 L	Semi-Final
1	6	1989-6-30	Osnabrück	Italy	Start	94	2-1	2–1 W	3rd Place Match
1995 European Championship
2	7	1995-2-26	Kristiansand	Norway	Start	61	3-2	3–4 L	Semi-Final 1st Leg
	8	1995-3-5	Jönköping	Norway	off 46' (on Videkull)			4–1 W	Semi-Final 2nd Leg
