= Cebola =

Brazilian footballer

Personal information
- Full name: Lucilene de Souza Marinho
- Place of birth: Belém, Brazil
- Position: Forward

International career
Years	Team	Apps	(Gls)
- Brazil

Lucilene de Souza Marinho, better known by her nickname Cebola is a Brazilian former international football forward who last played for Tuna Luso.

== International career ==
Marinho represented Brazil at the 1988 FIFA Women's Invitation Tournament.
