= Fia Carioca =

Brazilian footballer (born 1964)

Personal information
- Full name: Maria Lúcia da Silva Lima
- Date of birth: 1 April 1964 (age 62)
- Position: Midfielder

Senior career*
Years	Team	Apps	(Gls)
- Bangu
- Radar
- Vasco

International career^{‡}
- Brazil
- * Club domestic league appearances and goals ‡ National team caps and goals as of 16 November 1991 (before the 1991 FIFA Women's World Cup)

Maria Lúcia da Silva Lima (born 1 April 1964), commonly known as Fia Carioca for distinguishing purposes or simply Fia, is a Brazilian footballer who played as a midfielder for the Brazil women's national football team. She was part of the team at the 1991 FIFA Women's World Cup. At the club level she played for EC Radar in Brazil, as well as Bangu and Vasco da Gama.
