= Doralice (footballer) =

Brazilian footballer (born 1963)

Doralice Santos
Personal information
- Date of birth: 23 October 1963 (age 63)
- Position: Defender

Senior career*
Years	Team	Apps	(Gls)
- Radar

International career^{‡}
- Brazil
- * Club domestic league appearances and goals ‡ National team caps and goals as of 16 November 1991 (before the 1991 FIFA Women's World Cup)

Doralice Santos (born 23 October 1963) commonly known as Doralice is a former Brazilian footballer who played as a defender for the Brazil women's national football team. She was part of the team at the 1991 FIFA Women's World Cup. At the club level, she plays for EC Radar in Brazil.
