= Anette Hansson =

Swedish footballer (born 1963)

Personal information
- Full name: Anette Hansson
- Date of birth: 2 May 1963 (age 63)
- Position: Defender

Senior career*
Years	Team	Apps	(Gls)
- Malmö FF Dam
1985–1987	Öxabäck IF		
- Jitex BK

International career^{‡}
1984–1991	Sweden	39	(3)
- * Club domestic league appearances and goals as of 1 June 2013 ‡ National team caps and goals as of 1 June 2013

Anette Hansson (born 2 May 1963) is a Swedish former football defender who won 39 caps for the Sweden women's national football team, scoring three goals.

== International career ==
Hansson made her senior Sweden debut in the 1984 European Competition for Women's Football final first–leg against England at Ullevi on 12 May 1984. Sweden won the trophy in a penalty shootout at Kenilworth Road after a 1–1 aggregate draw.

Hansson's first international goal came in her second appearance, against rivals Norway; in a 2–2 friendly draw at Åråsen Stadion on 5 September 1984. At the 1988 FIFA Women's Invitation Tournament in Guangdong she was part of the Swedish squad who finished runners–up to Norway.

In 1991 Hansson helped Sweden to a third-place finish at the inaugural FIFA Women's World Cup in Guangdong, China. Playing as a sweeper, she featured in four of the team's six matches. In the first game against the United States, Hansson sent a second half penalty kick wide with the Swedes 3–0 down. They ultimately lost the match 3–2.
