= Marcinha =

Brazilian footballer and coach (born 1962)

Personal information
- Full name: Márcia Honório da Silva
- Date of birth: 22 August 1962 (age 64)
- Place of birth: Caieiras, Brazil
- Position: Midfielder

Senior career*
Years	Team	Apps	(Gls)
- Juventus-SP
- Radar
- Corinthians
- Palmeiras

International career^{‡}
1986–1991	Brazil		
- * Club domestic league appearances and goals as of 22:52, 26 April 2013 (UTC) ‡ National team caps and goals as of 22:52, 26 April 2013 (UTC)

Márcia Honório da Silva (born 22 August 1962), commonly known as Marcinha, is a Brazilian football coach and former player. She was a midfielder for the Brazil women's national football team.

In 1984 Marcinha, who was playing for Clube Atlético Juventus, had the meniscus removed from her right knee. She was employed in a beauty salon at the time.

Marcinha was part of the EC Radar club team who represented Brazil at the 1988 FIFA Women's Invitation Tournament in Guangdong and finished in third place. She had also played for Brazil at the 1986 edition of the Mundialito tournament in Italy.

In the 1991 FIFA Women's World Cup, Marcinha started all three group games as Brazil were eliminated in the first round. During the tournament, she was unimpressed when her roommate allegedly had sex with Eurico Lira in the next bed. Marcinha complained and Lira, the owner of EC Radar and bankroller of the women's national team, was removed from the Brazilian Football Confederation (CBF) in the ensuing scandal.

The Brazilian women's national team did not play another match for over three years, until a sponsorship from Maizena corn starch allowed them to play in the 1995 South American Women's Football Championship. Marcinha was not included in the squad.

After playing futsal for Polícia Militar, CA Juventus, Bordon and Sabesp, Marcinha stopped playing in 2000. She became a youth futsal coach in São Paulo, with Érika among her protégées. Male footballers Thiago Motta and Deco also passed through teams coached by Marcinha.
