= Marisa (footballer) =

Brazilian footballer

Personal information
- Full name: Marisa Pires Nogueira
- Date of birth: 23 June 1966 (age 60)
- Place of birth: Rio de Janeiro, Brazil
- Height: 1.56 m (5 ft 1 1/2 in)
- Position: Defender

Senior career*
| Years | Team | Apps | (Gls) |
- Radar
- Vasco da Gama
- Saad

International career^{‡}
- Brazil
- * Club domestic league appearances and goals as of 22:52, 26 April 2013 (UTC) ‡ National team caps and goals as of 22:52, 26 April 2013 (UTC)

Marisa Pires Nogueira (born 10 August 1966), commonly known as Marisa, is a Brazilian footballer who played as a defender for the Brazil women's national football team.

Marisa was named in the EC Radar club team who represented Brazil at the 1988 FIFA Women's Invitation Tournament in Guangdong and finished in third place.

In the 1991 FIFA Women's World Cup, team captain Marisa started all three group games as Brazil were eliminated in the first round. She remained in the national squad for the next campaign at the 1995 South American Women's Football Championship, but was not included in the squad for the 1995 FIFA Women's World Cup. In 1997 Marisa was playing for São Paulo FC.

Marisa was named in the 30–player pre–selection for the 1999 FIFA Women's World Cup, and retained her place in the 20 for the final tournament.

In 2007 Marisa was the coach of Vasco da Gama's female section. In July 2012 she was playing in a local futsal league.
