= Eva Zeikfalvy =

Swedish footballer

Personal information
- Full name: Eva Zeikfalvy
- Date of birth: 18 April 1967 (age 59)
- Place of birth: Veberöd, Sweden
- Position: Defender

Senior career*
Years	Team	Apps	(Gls)
- Malmö FF Dam
- Tyresö FF
- Malmö FF Dam

International career^{‡}
1988–2000	Sweden	69	(2)
- * Club domestic league appearances and goals ‡ National team caps and goals as of 18 October 2007

Eva Zeikfalvy (born 18 April 1967) is a Swedish former association football defender who won 69 caps for the Sweden women's national football team, scoring two goals. She represented Sweden at the FIFA Women's World Cup in 1991 and 1995. She is nicknamed Zäta.

== Club career ==
Growing up in Veberöd, Zeikfalvy played football with the local Veberöds AIF girls' team until her family moved to Malmö in 1977.

Zeikfalvy left Malmö and stopped playing after the 2000 Damallsvenskan season.

== International career ==
Zeikfalvy made her senior Sweden debut in 1988. At the 1988 FIFA Women's Invitation Tournament in Guangdong she was part of the Swedish team who finished runners-up to Norway. The Chinese press voted her into the tournament's official all-star team.

In 1991 Zeikfalvy helped Sweden to a third-place finish at the inaugural FIFA Women's World Cup. The previous year she had collected the Diamantbollen award for the best female footballer in the country.

Continued good form at club level meant Zeikfalvy was linked with a call-up to Sweden's 2000 Sydney Olympics squad. She was unable to attend due to her studies.

== Personal life ==
Zeikfalvy is an orthopedic technician. She is of Hungarian parentage.

Since her retirement from playing, Zeikfalvy has also worked as a coach. She rejoined Malmö FF Dam as a youth team coach in December 2002. For the 2004 season she moved to Husie IF to work as an assistant to former club and Sweden team-mate Lena Videkull.

In September 2012 Zeikfalvy joined Danish Elitedivisionen club B.93/HIK/Skjold as an assistant to former Malmö team-mate Denise Reddy.
