= UEFA Women's Euro 1995 =

Fußball-Europameisterschaft der Frauen 1995 Europamesterskapet i fotball for kvinner 1995 Europamästerskapet i fotboll för damer 1995
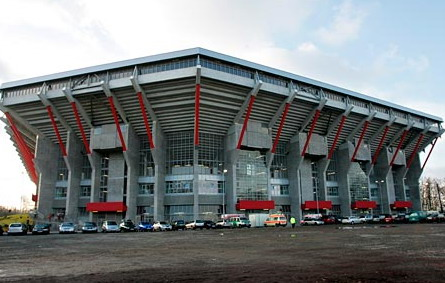
- The outside of Fritz-Walter-Stadion in Kaiserslautern, Germany, where the final was held

Tournament details
- Host countries: England; Germany; Norway; Sweden
- Dates: 11 December 1994 – 26 March 1995
- Teams: 4
- Venues: 5 (in 5 host cities)

Final positions
- Champions: Germany (3rd title)
- Runners-up: Sweden

Tournament statistics
- Matches played: 5
- Goals scored: 25 (5 per match)
- Attendance: 20,545 (4,109 per match)
- Top scorer: (Sweden) Lena Videkull (3 goals)
- Best player: (Germany) Birgit Prinz

The 1995 UEFA Women's Championship, often called the 1995 Women's Euros or just the 1995 Euros, was a women's association football tournament which was held between 11 December 1994 and 26 March 1995, involving UEFA-affiliated national teams who have qualified for the competition.

Germany won the competition for the third time, beating Sweden in the final.

== Format ==
In the qualifying round, 29 teams were divided into 8 groups (containing 3 or 4 teams), with the winners of each group advancing to the quarter-finals. In the quarter-finals and semi-finals, matches were played on a home-and-away two-legged basis. In the final, only one match was played, with the winner claiming the UEFA Women's Championship title. While one of the semi-final matches was played in 1994, and there was no singular host, UEFA considers the semi-finals and final as part of the final tournament.

== Squads ==
For a list of all squads that played in the final tournament, see 1995 UEFA Women's Championship squads

== Bracket ==
Semi-finals
England	1	1	2
Germany	4	2	6
Norway	4	1	5
Sweden	3	4	7

Final
26 March – Kaiserslautern
Germany	3
Sweden	2

== Results ==
=== Semifinals ===
==== First leg ====
11 December 1994

England	1–4	Germany
Farley 7'	DFB Report (in German); Report	Mohr 32', 80'; Brocker 68'; Wiegmann 87' (pen.)

Vicarage Road, Watford
Attendance: 800
Referee: Sándor Piller (Hungary)
26 February 1995
16:00

Norway	4–3	Sweden
Aarønes 44', 64'; Sandberg 60'; Waage 89'	NFF Report (in Norwegian); SvFF Report (in Swedish); Report	Kalte 15'; Andelén 55'; H. Johansson 61'

Sørlandshallen, Kristiansand
Attendance: 2,098
Referee: Finn Lambek (Denmark)

==== Second leg ====
23 February 1995

Germany	2–1	England
Waller 34' (o.g.); Prinz 79'	DFB Report (in German); Report	Farley 1'

Ruhrstadion, Bochum
Attendance: 7,000
Referee: Kostadin Guerginov (Bulgaria)

Germany won 6–2 on aggregate.

4 March 1995
13:00

Sweden	4–1	Norway
Kalte 53'; Videkull 59', 61', 76'	NFF Report (in Norwegian); SvFF Report (in Swedish); Report	Medalen 28'

Tipshallen, Jönköping
Attendance: 2,147
Referee: William Young (Scotland)

Sweden won 7–5 on aggregate.

=== Final ===
26 March 1995

Germany	3–2	Sweden
Meinert 33'; Prinz 64'; Wiegmann 85'	DFB Report (in German); SvFF Report (in Swedish); Report	Andersson 6'; Andelén 89'

Fritz-Walter-Stadion, Kaiserslautern
Attendance: 8,500
Referee: Ilkka Koho (Finland)

== Goalscorers ==
3 goals

- (Sweden) Lena Videkull

2 goals

- (England) Karen Farley
- (Germany) Heidi Mohr
- (Germany) Birgit Prinz
- (Germany) Bettina Wiegmann
- (Norway) Ann Kristin Aarønes
- (Sweden) Anneli Andelén
- (Sweden) Ulrika Kalte

1 goal

- (Germany) Maren Meinert
- (Germany) Patricia Brocker
- (Norway) Linda Medalen
- (Norway) Kristin Sandberg
- (Norway) Anita Waage
- (Sweden) Malin Andersson
- (Sweden) Helen Johansson

Own goal

- (England) Louise Waller (playing against Germany)

== See also ==
- UEFA Women's Championship
- Women's football (soccer)
