= Pelézinha =

Brazilian footballer

Personal information
- Full name: Marilza Martins da Silva
- Date of birth: 12 March 1964 (age 62)
- Place of birth: Rio de Janeiro, Brazil
- Height: 1.58 m (5 ft 2 in)
- Position: Forward

Senior career*
Years	Team	Apps	(Gls)
- America-RJ
- Radar

International career^{‡}
1986–1991	Brazil		
- * Club domestic league appearances and goals as of 22:52, 28 April 2013 (UTC) ‡ National team caps and goals as of 22:52, 28 April 2013 (UTC)

Marilza Martins da Silva (born 12 March 1964), commonly known as Pelézinha, is a Brazilian former football player, who operated as a forward for the Brazil women's national football team. Her nickname is an homage to the celebrated male footballer Pelé.

== Early life ==
Pelézinha began playing football as a youngster with the boys in her neighbourhood of Lins de Vasconcelos, north of Rio de Janeiro. She grew up as a supporter of Flamengo and admired Adílio.

== Career ==
In 1981, Pelézinha quit school and left America-RJ to join EC Radar on a professional basis. After playing for Radar, representing Brazil, in the 1986 edition of the Mundialito tournament in Italy, Italian clubs reportedly offered a $35,000 transfer fee to sign star player Pelézinha. She was also part of the Radar squad who went to the 1988 FIFA Women's Invitation Tournament in Guangdong as Brazil and finished in third place.

In the 1991 FIFA Women's World Cup, Pelézinha started the second group game against the United States. She was unable to make an impression against the American defense and was substituted early in the second half for 16–year–old Pretinha. Disastrous attempts to play the offside trap contributed to Brazil's 5–0 defeat to the eventual champions. Pelézinha was a reserve in the other two group games.

The Brazilian women's national team did not play another match for over three years, until a sponsorship from Maizena corn starch allowed them to play in the 1995 South American Women's Football Championship. Pelézinha was absent from the squad.
