= Danda (footballer) =

Brazilian footballer (born 1962)

Personal information
- Full name: Rosângela Rocha
- Date of birth: 19 November 1962 (age 63)
- Position: Midfielder

Senior career*
Years	Team	Apps	(Gls)
- Radar

International career^{‡}
- Brazil
- * Club domestic league appearances and goals ‡ National team caps and goals as of 16 November 1991 (before the 1991 FIFA Women's World Cup)

Rosângela Rocha (born 19 November 1962), commonly known as Danda, is a Brazilian former footballer who played as a midfielder for the Brazil women's national football team. She was part of the team at the 1991 FIFA Women's World Cup. At the club level, she played for EC Radar in Brazil.
