= Linda Hamilton (soccer) =

American soccer player (born 1969)

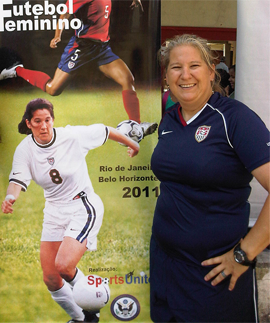

Personal information
- Full name: Linda Ann Hamilton
- Date of birth: June 4, 1969 (age 57)
- Place of birth: Atlanta, Georgia, United States
- Position: Defender

Team information
- Current team: Southwestern University (head coach)

College career
Years	Team	Apps	(Gls)
1987–1989	NC State Wolfpack		
1990	North Carolina Tar Heels		

International career
1987–1995	United States	72	(1)

Managerial career
- 1994: Old Dominion Monarchs
- 2007–2013: North Florida Ospreys
- 2014: Illinois College Lady Blues
- 2015–: Southwestern Pirates
Medal record
FIFA Women's World Cup
Gold medal – first place	1991 USA	Team competition
Bronze medal – third place	1995 USA	Team competition

Linda Ann Hamilton (born June 4, 1969) is an American retired soccer defender and former member of the United States women's national soccer team. She is currently head coach of the women's soccer team at the Southwestern University. Hamilton was inducted into the Georgia Soccer Hall of Fame in 2001 and the National Soccer Hall of Fame in 2022.

== Early life ==
Hamilton grew up in the Atlanta, Georgia area and attended Wheeler High School where she lettered in soccer, basketball, tennis and track. She played club soccer with both the Buckhead YMCA and the DeKalb Soccer Association at Blackburn Park.

== Playing career ==
=== University ===
Hamilton spent the first three years of her college career at North Carolina State University before transferring to the University of North Carolina to play for the Tar Heels led by national team coach, Anson Dorrance. In 1990 while concurrently playing for the United States women's national soccer team, Hamilton ended her collegiate career as a member of the Tar Heels squad that won the fifth of nine consecutive NCAA titles. While playing for UNC, Linda Hamilton worked in the call center of soccer retailer Eurosport/SOCCER.COM with teammate Mia Hamm. A highly decorated player, Hamilton was a four-time All-American, four-time All-Atlantic Coast Conference selection and was the runner-up for the national player of the year in each of her final three collegiate seasons.

=== International ===
Hamilton played for the United States women's national soccer team from 1987 to 1995. In 1991, she was part of the team that won the first Women's World Cup in China.

== Coaching career ==
Hamilton began her coaching career by getting her "A" license while still at North Carolina and starting the Old Dominion's women's program in 1994. She served as director of player development for the Richmond Strikers Soccer Club while working in full-time at another job. She became assistant coach at Hofstra University in 2006 and later head coach at the University of North Florida in 2008.

Hamilton was the head coach for the women's soccer team at Illinois College in Jacksonville, Illinois. In February 2015, she became the head coach for women's soccer team at Southwestern University in Georgetown, Texas.

== Sports administration career ==
Hamilton has remained involved with U.S. Soccer as a member of the board of directors with the United States Soccer Federation, U.S. Soccer Foundation and U.S. Athletes Council.

In 2011, she traveled to Brazil on behalf of the United States Department of State to conduct soccer clinics with former national team member and teammate, Tiffany Roberts Sahaydak.
