= Nalvinha =

Brazilian footballer (born 1965)

Personal information
- Full name: Lunalva Torres de Almeida
- Date of birth: 14 July 1965 (age 61)
- Position: Midfielder

Senior career*
Years	Team	Apps	(Gls)
1990–1996	Saad		
2000	Grêmio		

International career
1991–1996	Brazil		
- * Club domestic league appearances and goals

Lunalva Torres de Almeida (born 14 July 1965), commonly known as Nalvinha, is a Brazilian footballer who played as a midfielder for the Brazil women's national football team. She was part of the team at the 1991 FIFA Women's World Cup and 1995 FIFA Women's World Cup.

At club level she spent much of her career with Saad Esporte Clube, a successful Brazilian women's club of the era. She also represented Grêmio.
