= Adriana (footballer, born 1968) =

Brazilian footballer

Personal information
- Full name: Adriana Alvim Burke
- Birth name: Adriana Alvim Viola
- Date of birth: 26 December 1968 (age 57)
- Position: Forward

College career
Years	Team	Apps	(Gls)
1988–1992	St. John's Red Storm	51	(40)

Senior career*
Years	Team	Apps	(Gls)
- Radar

International career^{‡}
- Brazil
- * Club domestic league appearances and goals ‡ National team caps and goals as of 16 November 1991 (before the 1991 FIFA Women's World Cup)

Adriana Alvim Burke (née Viola; born 26 December 1968), commonly known as Adriana, is a Brazilian former footballer who played as a forward for the Brazil women's national football team. She was part of the team at the 1991 FIFA Women's World Cup. At club level she played for EC Radar in Brazil.

While playing college soccer for St. John's Red Storm, Adriana set goal (40) and points (91) records which were not broken until 2015 by Rachel Daly. She was inducted into the program's Hall of Fame in 2014.

At the 1991 FIFA Women's World Cup, Adriana started two of three group games as Brazil were eliminated in the first round and was the top goal scorer of the tournament with 4 goals.
