= Anneli Andelén =

Swedish female association football player

Personal information
- Full name: Anneli Andelén
- Date of birth: 21 June 1968 (age 58)
- Place of birth: Älvsered, Sweden
- Position: Forward

Senior career*
Years	Team	Apps	(Gls)
1983–1996	Öxabäcks IF		
1997–1998	Suzuyo Shimizu Lovely Ladies		
1999–2000	Landvetter		
- IF Böljan

International career^{‡}
1985–1995	Sweden	88	(37)
- * Club domestic league appearances and goals ‡ National team caps and goals as of 18 October 2007

Anneli Andelén (born 21 June 1968) is a Swedish former association football forward who won 88 caps for the Sweden women's national football team, scoring 37 goals. She represented Sweden at the FIFA Women's World Cup in 1991 and 1995. Andelén also played professional club football in Japan with Suzuyo Shimizu Lovely Ladies.

== Club career ==
Andelén joined Öxabäcks IF as a 15-year-old in 1983 and won the league title in her first season. She was Damallsvenskan top goalscorer on three consecutive occasions (1992, 1993 and 1994). Andelén played in seven consecutive Svenska Cupen finals with the club, who became known as Öxabäck/Marks IF in 1991. In August 1994 she scored all six goals in Öxabäck/Marks IF's 6–1 destruction of Gideonsberg.

In 1997, while playing for Suzuyo Shimizu Lovely Ladies, Andelén was L. League top goalscorer with 19 goals and was named in the league all-star team.

== International career ==
Andelén made her senior Sweden debut on 22 August 1985, a 5–0 win over Norway in Sundsvall. In 1991 Andelén's three goals helped Sweden to a third-place finish at the inaugural FIFA Women's World Cup and in 1992 she collected the Diamantbollen award for the best female footballer in the country. Her brace against Denmark in the second leg of the quarter finals of the UEFA Women's Euro 1995 qualifying campaign was the difference in overcoming a 0–2 deficit to beat Denmark 3–2 on aggregate and qualify for UEFA Women's Euro 1995. In the final of that tournament in March 1995 at Fritz-Walter-Stadion in Kaiserslautern, Andelén's late goal was not enough to stop Germany from beating Sweden 3–2. She quit the national team after featuring at the 1995 FIFA Women's World Cup, which Sweden hosted. There had been a dispute over the team's tactics at the tournament.

Anneli Andelén competed in two FIFA Women's World Cups: China 1991, and Sweden 1995. In the 1991 edition, Andelén played every minute of the tournament and scored the opening goal in a 4–0 victory over Germany in the Third Place Match.

Anneli Andelén appeared in three European Championship tournaments. Her side finished in second place at the 1987 and 1995 editions of the competition, and took home a third-place finish in 1989.

== Personal life ==
During her playing career, Andelén was in a relationship with club teammate Nathalie Geeris. Andelén married Lisa in June 2008. She became chief executive of the family sawmill business after her football career.

== Career statistics ==
=== International goals ===
No.	Date	Venue	Opponent	Score	Result	Competition	Ref.
1.	7 July 1987	National Sports Center, Blaine, United States	China	5–0	6–0	North America Cup	
2.	3 June 1988	Henry Fok Stadium, Panyu, China	United States	1–1	1–1	1988 FIFA Women's Invitation Tournament	
3.	18 September 1988	Lekevi IP, Mariestad, Sweden	Republic of Ireland	2–0	4–0	1989 European Competition for Women's Football qualifying	
4.	18 September 1988	Lekevi IP, Mariestad, Sweden	Republic of Ireland	3–0	4–0	1989 European Competition for Women's Football qualifying	
5.	15 October 1988	Odense Stadium, Odense, Denmark	Denmark	5–1	5–1	1989 European Competition for Women's Football qualifying	
6.	21 August 1991	Nösnäsvallen, Stenungsund, Sweden	Soviet Union	1–0	2–0	Friendly	
7.	23 October 1991	Nou Estadi de Palamós, Palamós, Spain	Spain	1–0	4–0	UEFA Women's Euro 1993 qualifying	
8.	7 November 1991	Zürich, Switzerland	Switzerland	1–0	4–1	Friendly	
9.	7 November 1991	Zürich, Switzerland	Switzerland	2–0	4–1	Friendly	
10.	19 November 1991	New Plaza Stadium, Foshan, China	Japan	3–0	8–0	1991 FIFA Women's World Cup	
11.	19 November 1991	New Plaza Stadium, Foshan, China	Japan	7–0	8–0	1991 FIFA Women's World Cup	
12.	29 November 1991	Guangdong Provincial People's Stadium, Guangzhou, China	Germany	1–0	4–0	1991 FIFA Women's World Cup	
13.	7 June 1992	Dalymount Park, Dublin, Republic of Ireland	Republic of Ireland	1–0	1–0	UEFA Women's Euro 1993 qualifying	
14.	25 August 1992	Kragerø Stadion, Kragerø, Norway	Norway	2–3	3–3	Friendly	
15.	25 August 1992	Kragerø Stadion, Kragerø, Norway	Norway	3–3	3–3	Friendly	
16.	20 September 1992	Ryavallen, Borås, Sweden	Republic of Ireland	3–0	10–0	UEFA Women's Euro 1993 qualifying	
17.	20 September 1992	Ryavallen, Borås, Sweden	Republic of Ireland	5–0	10–0	UEFA Women's Euro 1993 qualifying	
18.	20 September 1992	Ryavallen, Borås, Sweden	Republic of Ireland	8–0	10–0	UEFA Women's Euro 1993 qualifying	
19.	20 September 1992	Ryavallen, Borås, Sweden	Republic of Ireland	9–0	10–0	UEFA Women's Euro 1993 qualifying	
20.	13 October 1992	Ryavallen, Borås, Sweden	Denmark	1–0	1–2	UEFA Women's Euro 1993 qualifying	
21.	11 March 1993	Ayia Napa Municipal Stadium, Ayia Napa, Cyprus	Germany	3–0	3–1	Friendly tournament	
22.	1 June 1993	Ryavallen, Borås, Sweden	Norway	2–1	4–2	Friendly	
23.	22 September 1993	Ryavallen, Borås, Sweden	Germany	3–2	3–2	Friendly	
24.	13 October 1993	Štadión Pasienky, Bratislava, Slovakia	Slovakia	1–0	2–0	UEFA Women's Euro 1995 qualifying	
25.	4 May 1994	Arosvallen, Västerås, Sweden	Italy	1–0	1–0	Friendly	
26.	22 May 1994	Ozolnieki Stadium, Ozolnieki, Latvia	Latvia	2–0	5–0	UEFA Women's Euro 1995 qualifying	
27.	15 June 1994	Strömvallen, Gävle, Sweden	Slovakia	2–0	6–0	UEFA Women's Euro 1995 qualifying	
28.	15 June 1994	Strömvallen, Gävle, Sweden	Slovakia	4–0	6–0	UEFA Women's Euro 1995 qualifying	
29.	5 August 1994	Complexe sportif Claude-Robillard, Montreal, Canada	Canada	1–1	2–1	Friendly	
30.	29 October 1994	Malmö Stadion, Malmö, Sweden	Denmark	2–0	3–0	UEFA Women's Euro 1995 qualifying	
31.	29 October 1994	Malmö Stadion, Malmö, Sweden	Denmark	3–0	3–0	UEFA Women's Euro 1995 qualifying	
32.	26 February 1995	Sørlandshallen, Kristiansand, Norway	Norway	2–1	3–4	UEFA Women's Euro 1995	
33.	16 March 1995	Estádio José Arcanjo, Olhão, Portugal	Netherlands	2–1	2–1	1995 Algarve Cup	
34.	19 March 1995	Estádio Municipal de Loulé, Loulé, Portugal	Denmark	2–1	3–2	1995 Algarve Cup	
35.	26 March 1995	Fritz-Walter-Stadion, Kaiserslautern, Germany	Germany	2–3	2–3	UEFA Women's Euro 1995	
36.	13 May 1995	Örjans Vall, Halmstad, Sweden	England	2–0	4–0	Friendly	
37.	9 June 1995	Arosvallen, Västerås, Sweden	Japan	2–0	2–0	1995 FIFA Women's World Cup	

== Honours ==
Individual

- Diamantbollen: 1992
