= Camilla Fors =

Swedish footballer

Personal information
- Date of birth: 24 April 1969 (age 57)
- Position: Defender

Senior career*
| Years | Team | Apps | (Gls) |
- Jitex BK

International career^{‡}
- Sweden
- * Club domestic league appearances and goals ‡ National team caps and goals as of 16 November 1991 (before the 1991 FIFA Women's World Cup)

Camilla Fors (born 24 April 1969) is a Swedish footballer who played as a defender for the Sweden women's national football team. She was part of the team at the 1989 European Competition for Women's Football and inaugural 1991 FIFA Women's World Cup. At the club level she played for Jitex BK in Sweden.
