= Rosa Lima =

Brazilian footballer

Personal information
- Full name: Rosa Maria Gomes de Lima
- Date of birth: 2 May 1964 (age 62)
- Place of birth: Contagem, Brazil
- Height: 1.60 m (5 ft 3 in)
- Position: Right back

Senior career*
| Years | Team | Apps | (Gls) |
- Eldorado
- Benfica
- Cruzeiro
- Radar
- Vasco da Gama

International career^{‡}
- Brazil
- * Club domestic league appearances and goals as of 22:52, 25 April 2013 (UTC) ‡ National team caps and goals as of 22:52, 25 April 2013 (UTC)

Rosa Maria Gomes de Lima (born 2 May 1964), commonly known as Rosa, is a Brazilian retired footballer who played as a defender for the Brazil women's national football team.

She represented Brazil at the inaugural FIFA Women's World Cup in 1991.

== Career ==
An attacking right–back, de Lima joined EC Radar in 1983 after playing for Eldorado in her native Contagem, then Benfica and Cruzeiro. Later that year she had her jaw broken in a notorious grudge match against Bangu.

In the 1991 FIFA Women's World Cup, de Lima played in all three group games as Brazil were eliminated in the first round. Having moved on to Vasco da Gama, she was one of just two players in the squad who were not contracted to Radar. The 16–year–old Pretinha was the other.

Rosa remained in the national squad for the next campaign at the 1995 South American Women's Football Championship. She was not included in the squad for the 1995 FIFA Women's World Cup.
