= Meg (footballer) =

Brazilian footballer (born 1956)

Personal information
- Full name: Margarete Maria Pioresan
- Date of birth: 1 January 1956 (age 70)
- Place of birth: Toledo, Paraná, Brazil
- Height: 5 ft 9 in (1.75 m)
- Position: Goalkeeper

Senior career*
Years	Team	Apps	(Gls)
- Radar
- Vasco da Gama

International career^{‡}
1991–1996	Brazil		
- * Club domestic league appearances and goals as of 22:52, 17 April 2013 (UTC) ‡ National team caps and goals as of 22:52, 17 April 2013 (UTC)

Meg
Medal record

Representing Brazil

Women's Handball

Pan American Games
Bronze medal – third place	1987 Indianapolis	Team

Margarete Maria Pioresan (born 1 January 1956), commonly known as Meg, is a Brazilian former professional handballer and footballer who played as a goalkeeper. She represented the Brazil women's national football team at the FIFA Women's World Cup in 1991 and 1995 and played in the 1996 Olympics at the age of 40. Earlier in her sporting career Meg had played for the Brazil women's national handball team, winning a bronze medal at the 1987 Pan American Games.

== Career ==
Meg began playing handball after enrolling at Universidade Estadual de Maringá in 1975 and moved to Rio de Janeiro in 1979 to play handball as a goalkeeper. She was called into the Brazil women's national handball team in 1983.

While in Rio de Janeiro, Meg also took up football and played in goal for EC Radar. After two years playing beach soccer in 1980 and 1981, Radar played on grass from 1982 onwards. Placar magazine reported in 1985 that Meg was earning a salary of 150,000 Cr from Radar. That year she quit football in order to focus on her handball commitments, including playing at the 1987 Pan American Games where Brazil won bronze medals.

Still concentrating on handball, Meg rejected a call–up from the Brazilian Football Confederation (CBF) to play for Brazil at the 1988 FIFA Women's Invitation Tournament. After playing in a tournament in Bulgaria in 1989 Meg concluded her handball career. When she was invited to the 1991 FIFA Women's World Cup, she returned to football—after six years out of the game and at the age of 35—citing her dream of reaching the Olympic Games.

Meg maintained her physical condition by training hard and playing club football for the women's section of CR Vasco da Gama. In the 1995 FIFA Women's World Cup Meg played in Brazil's shock win over hosts Sweden in the opening game. Although defeats to Japan and Germany consigned Brazil to elimination in last place in the group, Meg still achieved her dream of Olympic qualification. World Cup quarter finalists England were ineligible and Brazil had the best record of the teams eliminated in the group stage. Meg had played with a broken finger sustained while saving a penalty from Homare Sawa during the 2–1 defeat to Japan.

Brazil exceeded expectations at the 1996 Olympic Football Tournament, finishing in fourth place. Meg intended to retire after the Olympics but Vasco persuaded her to play on until 2000, using veteran male player Mauro Galvão as an example.
