= Helen Nilsson (footballer) =

Swedish footballer

Personal information
- Date of birth: 24 November 1970 (age 55)
- Position: Forward

Senior career*
Years	Team	Apps	(Gls)
- Gideonsbergs IF

International career^{‡}
	Sweden	36	(6)
- * Club domestic league appearances and goals ‡ National team caps and goals as of 2017

Helen Nilsson (born 24 November 1970) is a Swedish footballer who played as a forward for the Sweden women's national football team. She was part of the team at the 1991 FIFA Women's World Cup and 1995 FIFA Women's World Cup. At the club level she played for Gideonsbergs IF in Sweden.
