= Malin Lundgren =

Swedish footballer (born 1967)

Personal information
- Date of birth: 9 March 1967 (age 59)
- Position: Defender

Senior career*
Years	Team	Apps	(Gls)
- Malmö FF

International career^{‡}
	Sweden	63	(6)
- * Club domestic league appearances and goals ‡ National team caps and goals as of 2017

Malin Lundgren (born 9 March 1967) is a Swedish footballer who played as a defender for the Sweden women's national football team. She was part of the team at the 1991 FIFA Women's World Cup and 1995 FIFA Women's World Cup. At the club level she played for Malmö FF in Sweden.
