= Marie Karlsson =

Swedish footballer

Personal information
- Date of birth: 4 December 1963 (age 62)
- Position: Midfielder

Senior career*
Years	Team	Apps	(Gls)
- Öxabäck/Marks IF

International career^{‡}
	Sweden	51	(2)
- * Club domestic league appearances and goals ‡ National team caps and goals as of 2017

Marie Karlsson (born 4 December 1963) is a Swedish footballer who played as a midfielder for the Sweden women's national football team. She was part of the team at the 1987 European Competition for Women's Football, 1989 European Competition for Women's Football, and inaugural 1991 FIFA Women's World Cup. At the club level she played for Öxabäck/Marks IF in Sweden.
