= Fernando Pires (footballer, born 1951) =

Brazilian football coach and former player

Personal information
- Full name: Fernando Luís Brederodes Pires
- Date of birth: 7 February 1951 (age 75)
- Place of birth: Recife, Brazil
- Position: Defender

Senior career*
Years	Team	Apps	(Gls)
1975	Flamengo		
1976	Fluminense	16	(0)
1977	Portuguesa		
1978	Figueirense		
1979–1980	Boavista	5	(0)
1980–1981	Académico de Viseu	22	(1)
1981–1985	Penafiel		

Managerial career
- 1991: Brazil women
- * Club domestic league appearances and goals

Fernando Luís Brederodes Pires (born 7 February 1951), commonly known as Fernando, is a Brazilian football coach and former player.

== Coaching career ==
Pires coached Brazil in the inaugural 1991 FIFA Women's World Cup.
