= Tamotsu Suzuki =

Japanese footballer and manager

Personal information
- Date of birth: 29 April 1947
- Place of birth: Saitama, Saitama, Empire of Japan
- Date of death: March 2025 (aged 77)

Youth career
- 1963–1965: Saitama Urawa High School
- 1966–1969: Rikkyo University

Senior career*
Years	Team	Apps	(Gls)
1972–1974	Nissan Motors		

Managerial career
- 1985: Nissan Motors
- 1987–1989: Nissan FC Ladies
- 1989–1996: Japan Women
- 1996–1998: Nikko Securities Dream Ladies
- 1999: Japan Women
- * Club domestic league appearances and goals

Tamotsu Suzuki (鈴木 保, Suzuki Tamotsu; 29 April 1947 – March 2025) was a Japanese football player and manager. He managed Japan women's national team.

== Playing career ==
Suzuki was born in Saitama on 29 April 1947. After graduating from Rikkyo University, he played for Nissan Motors from 1972 to 1974.

== Coaching career ==
From 1975, Suzuki became coach for Nissan Motors. He managed for Nissan Motors (1985) and Nissan FC Ladies (1987–1989).

In 1989, he became manager for Japan women's national team. He managed three world tournament, 1991, 1995 World Cup and 1996 Summer Olympics. In Asia, Japan won second place four times, AFC Women's Championship (1991, 1995) and Asian Games (1990, 1994). He resigned after 1996 Summer Olympics and Satoshi Miyauchi became a new manager.

In August 1996, he became manager for Nikko Securities Dream Ladies and won L.League champions for three years in a row to 1998. However, the club was disbanded due to financial strain end of 1998 season.

In June 1999, Japan under manager Miyauchi was defeated in group stage at 1999 World Cup and failure to qualify for 2000 Summer Olympics. After the 1999 World Cup, Suzuki became a manager for Japan national team again and managed Japan at 1999 AFC Women's Championship in November. Japan finished in fourth place and he resigned end of the championship.

In March 2025, Suzuki died at the age of 77. In September 2025, he was selected for the Japan Football Hall of Fame.
