= Lena Videkull =

Swedish footballer (born 1962)

Personal information
- Full name: Lena Mari Anette Videkull
- Date of birth: 9 December 1962 (age 63)
- Place of birth: Stockholm, Sweden
- Position: Forward

Youth career
- Göta BK

Senior career*
Years	Team	Apps	(Gls)
1981-1985	Trollhättans IF	97	(98)
1986	Kronängs IF		
1987-1988	Öxabäck IF	42	(44)
1989-1998	Malmö FF Dam	210	(201)
Total		349	(343)

International career^{‡}
1984–1996	Sweden	111	(71)

Managerial career
- 1999–2002: Malmö FF Dam
- 2005–2007: Husie IF
- * Club domestic league appearances and goals ‡ National team caps and goals as of 18 October 2007

Lena Mari Anette Videkull (born 6 December 1962) is a Swedish former association football forward who won 111 caps for the Sweden women's national football team, scoring 71 goals. Videkull can be seen in the Sveriges Television documentary television series The Other Sport from 2013.

== Club career ==
Videkull won the Damallsvenskan championship six times in her career. She was the league's top goalscorer on a record six occasions.

== International career ==
Videkull made her senior Sweden debut in the final of the first UEFA championships for national women's teams in May 1984. Sweden beat England 1–0 in the first leg at Ullevi, then prevailed in a penalty shootout at Kenilworth Road, Luton after a 1–0 defeat.

Sweden reached the final again in the next edition of the UEFA championships in 1987. Videkull scored in the final but the Swedes lost 2–1 to Norway. In May 1989 Videkull scored in a women's international match at Wembley Stadium, adding to Pia Sundhage's opening goal as Sweden beat England 2–0 in a curtain–raiser for the Rous Cup.

In 1991, Videkull helped Sweden to a third-place finish at the inaugural FIFA Women's World Cup. Videkull was Sweden's top scorer at that tournament, and tallied her country's first ever World Cup goal in a 2–3 loss to the USA on match day one. She also scored the fastest goal in a women's World Cup after 30 seconds in an 8–0 win against Japan.

In 1993, she was given the Diamantbollen award for the best Swedish female footballer of the year. Coming on as a second-half substitute in the second leg of the 1995 Women's Euro semi-final, Videkull scored a hat trick in a 4–1 win, ensuring the Swedes a spot in the final as they defeated Norway 7–5 on aggregate. She briefly retired after featuring for Sweden in the 1995 FIFA Women's World Cup, which they hosted, but was tempted into a comeback for the 1996 Summer Olympics.

=== Matches and goals scored at World Cup & Olympic tournaments ===
Key (expand for notes on "world cup and olympic goals")
Location	Geographic location of the venue where the competition occurred
Lineup	Start – played entire match on minute (off player) – substituted on at the minute indicated, and player was substituted off at the same time off minute (on player) – substituted off at the minute indicated, and player was substituted on at the same time (c) – captain
Min	The minute in the match the goal was scored. For list that include caps, blank indicates played in the match but did not score a goal.
Assist/pass	The ball was passed by the player, which assisted in scoring the goal. This column depends on the availability and source of this information.
penalty or pk	Goal scored on penalty-kick which was awarded due to foul by opponent. (Goals scored in penalty-shoot-out, at the end of a tied match after extra-time, are not included.)
Score	The match score after the goal was scored.
Result	The final score. W – match was won L – match was lost to opponent D – match was drawn (W) – penalty-shoot-out was won after a drawn match (L) – penalty-shoot-out was lost after a drawn match
aet	The score at the end of extra-time; the match was tied at the end of 90' regulation
pso	Penalty-shoot-out score shown in parentheses; the match was tied at the end of extra-time
	Pink background color – Olympic women's football tournament
	Blue background color – FIFA women's world cup final tournament

Goal	Match	Date	Location	Opponent	Lineup	Min	Score	Result	Competition
China 1991 FIFA Women's World Cup
1	1	1991-11-17	Panyu	United States	Start	65	1–3	2–3 L	Group match
2	2	1991-11-19	Foshan	Japan	off 41' (on Hedberg)	1	1–0	8–0 W	Group match
3	2	1991-11-19	Foshan	Japan	off 41' (on Hedberg)	11	2–0	8–0 W	Group match
	3	1991-11-24	Guangzhou	China	Start			1–0 W	Quarter-Final
4	4	1991-11-27	Panyu	Norway	Start	6	1–0	1–4 L	Semi-Final
5	5	1991-11-29	Guangzhou	Germany	Start	29	3–0	4–0 W	3rd Place Match
Sweden 1995 FIFA Women's World Cup
	6	1995-6-5	Helsingborg	Brazil	Start			0–1 L	Group match
	7	1995-6-7	Helsingborg	Germany	Start			3–2 W	Group match
6	8	1995-6-9	Västerås	Japan	Start	66	1–0	2–0 W	Group match
	9	1995-6-13	Helsingborg	China	Start			1–1 (pso 3–4) (L)	Quarter-Final
(United States) Atlanta 1996 Women's Olympic Football Tournament
	10	1996-7-21	Miami	China	Start			0–2 L	Group match
	11	1996-7-23	Orlando	United States	Start			1–2 L	Group match
7	12	1996-7-25	Orlando	Denmark	Start	76	3–0	3–1 W	Group match

=== Matches and goals scored at European Championship tournaments ===
Goal	Match	Date	Location	Opponent	Lineup	Min	Score	Result	Competition
1984 European Championship
	1	1984-5-27	Gothenburg	England	Start			1–0 W	Final 1st Leg
	2	1984-5-27	Luton	England	off 41' (on Uusitalo)			0–1 L (Note: The 1984 European Championship was won by Sweden on penalty kicks when both legs ended 1-0.)	Final 2nd Leg
(Norway) 1987 European Championship
	3	1987-6-11	Moss	England	Start			3–2 W	Semi-Final
1	4	1987-6-14	Oslo	Norway	Start	73	1–2	1–2 L	Final
(Germany) 1989 European Championship
2	5	1989-6-28	Lüdenscheid	Norway	Start	54	1–2	1–2 L	Semi-Final
	6	1989-6-30	Osnabrück	Italy	on 41'			2–1 W	3rd Place Match
1995 European Championship
	7	1995-2-26	Kristiansand	Norway	Start			3–4 L	Semi-Final 1st Leg
3	8	1995-3-5	Jönköping	Norway	on 46' (off Johansson)	59	2–1	4–1 W	Semi-Final 2nd Leg
4	8	1995-3-5	Jönköping	Norway	on 46' (off Johansson)	61	3–1	4–1 W	Semi-Final 2nd Leg
5	8	1995-3-5	Jönköping	Norway	on 46' (off Johansson)	76	4–1	4–1 W	Semi-Final 2nd Leg
	9	1995-3-26	Kaiserslautern	Germany	Start			2–3 L	Final

== International goals ==
No.	Date	Venue	Opponent	Score	Result	Competition	Ref.
1.	1 November 1984	Genoa, Italy	Italy	1–1	1–1	Friendly	
2.	1 May 1985	Bjärred, Sweden	Italy	1–0	1–0	Friendly	
3.	22 August 1985	Sundsvall, Sweden	Norway	3–0	5–0	Friendly	
4.	22 August 1985	Sundsvall, Sweden	Norway	4–0	5–0	Friendly	
5.	22 August 1985	Sundsvall, Sweden	Norway	5–0	5–0	Friendly	
6.	9 October 1985	Jönköping, Sweden	Belgium	1–0	5–0	1987 European Competition for Women's Football qualifying	
7.	9 October 1985	Jönköping, Sweden	Belgium	2–0	5–0	1987 European Competition for Women's Football qualifying	
8.	7 May 1986	Bergen, Norway	Norway	1–0	3–2	Friendly	
9.	7 May 1986	Bergen, Norway	Norway	2–0	3–2	Friendly	
10.	18 September 1986	Veszprém, Hungary	Hungary	4–1	4–1	Friendly	
11.	1 October 1986	Aalst, Belgium	Belgium	2–1	2–1	1987 European Competition for Women's Football qualifying	
12.	20 May 1987	Hammenhög, Sweden	Denmark	1–0	2–0	Friendly	
13.	14 June 1987	Oslo, Norway	Norway	1–2	1–2	1987 European Competition for Women's Football	
14.	7 July 1987	Blaine, United States	China	6–0	6–0	Friendly	
15.	11 July 1987	Minneapolis, United States	United States U-19	4–0	5–1	Friendly	
16.	11 July 1987	Minneapolis, United States	United States U-19	5–0	5–1	Friendly	
17.	19 August 1987	Nyköping, Sweden	Hungary	5–0	5–0	Friendly	
18.	27 April 1988	Kristianstad, Sweden	Switzerland	1–0	3–0	Friendly	
19.	5 June 1988	Panyu, China	Japan	1–0	3–0	1988 FIFA Women's Invitation Tournament	
20.	15 October 1988	Odense, Denmark	Denmark	1–0	5–1	1989 European Competition for Women's Football qualifying	
21.	15 October 1988	Odense, Denmark	Denmark	2–0	5–1	1989 European Competition for Women's Football qualifying	
22.	26 October 1988	Borås, Sweden	Denmark	1–0	1–1	1989 European Competition for Women's Football qualifying	
23.	23 May 1989	London, England	England	2–0	2–0	Friendly	
24.	28 June 1989	Lüdenscheid, Germany	Norway	1–2	1–2	1989 European Competition for Women's Football	
25.	22 October 1989	Helsingborg, Sweden	Poland	1–0	4–1	UEFA Women's Euro 1991 qualifying	
26.	23 March 1990	Ayia Napa, Cyprus	Finland	4–1	4–1	Friendly tournament	
27.	25 March 1990	Ayia Napa, Cyprus	Norway	1–1	1–1	Friendly tournament	
28.	10 June 1990	Gorzów, Poland	Poland	2–0	2–0	UEFA Women's Euro 1991 qualifying	
29.	19 September 1990	Halmstad, Sweden	Italy	1–0	4–0	Friendly	
30.	14 October 1990	Mariestad, Sweden	France	2–0	4–1	UEFA Women's Euro 1991 qualifying	
31.	2 December 1990	Ruggell, Liechtenstein	Switzerland	1–0	2–0	Friendly	
32.	2 December 1990	Ruggell, Liechtenstein	Switzerland	2–0	2–0	Friendly	
33.	5 May 1991	Shatura, Soviet Union	Soviet Union	2–0	4–0	Friendly	
34.	5 May 1991	Shatura, Soviet Union	Soviet Union	3–0	4–0	Friendly	
35.	9 October 1991	Borås, Sweden	Netherlands	2–0	3–1	Friendly	
36.	23 October 1991	Palencia, Spain	Spain	2–0	4–0	UEFA Women's Euro 1993 qualifying	
37.	17 November 1991	Guangzhou, China	United States	1–3	2–3	1991 FIFA Women's World Cup	
38.	19 November 1991	Foshan, China	Japan	1–0	8–0	1991 FIFA Women's World Cup	
39.	19 November 1991	Foshan, China	Japan	2–0	8–0	1991 FIFA Women's World Cup	
40.	27 November 1991	Guangzhou, China	Norway	1–0	1–4	1991 FIFA Women's World Cup	
41.	29 November 1991	Guangzhou, China	Germany	3–0	4–0	1991 FIFA Women's World Cup	
42.	8 March 1992	Paralimni, Cyprus	Norway	1–1	2–1	Friendly tournament	
43.	10 March 1992	Paralimni, Cyprus	Denmark	1–0	3–1	Friendly tournament	
44.	22 April 1992	Vlaardingen, Netherlands	Netherlands	1–2	1–2	Friendly	
45.	20 September 1992	Borås, Sweden	Republic of Ireland	4–0	10–0	UEFA Women's Euro 1993 qualifying	
46.	20 September 1992	Borås, Sweden	Republic of Ireland	6–0	10–0	UEFA Women's Euro 1993 qualifying	
47.	7 November 1992	Hjørring, Denmark	Denmark	1–0	1–1	UEFA Women's Euro 1993 qualifying	
48.	9 March 1993	Ayia Napa, Cyprus	France	1–1	3–1	Friendly tournament	
49.	9 March 1993	Ayia Napa, Cyprus	France	2–1	3–1	Friendly tournament	
50.	11 March 1993	Ayia Napa, Cyprus	Germany	1–0	3–1	Friendly tournament	
51.	1 June 1993	Borås, Sweden	Norway	3–2	4–2	Friendly	
52.	18 August 1993	Nynäshamn, Sweden	Latvia	2–0	9–0	UEFA Women's Euro 1995 qualifying	
53.	18 August 1993	Nynäshamn, Sweden	Latvia	3–0	9–0	UEFA Women's Euro 1995 qualifying	
54.	18 August 1993	Nynäshamn, Sweden	Latvia	9–0	9–0	UEFA Women's Euro 1995 qualifying	
55.	22 September 1993	Borås, Sweden	Germany	2–2	3–2	Friendly	
56.	20 March 1994	Loulé, Portugal	Denmark	1–0	1–0	1994 Algarve Cup	
57.	22 May 1994	Ozolnieki, Latvia	Latvia	1–0	5–0	UEFA Women's Euro 1995 qualifying	
58.	4 March 1995	Jönköping, Sweden	Norway	2–1	4–1	UEFA Women's Euro 1995	
59.	4 March 1995	Jönköping, Sweden	Norway	3–1	4–1	UEFA Women's Euro 1995	
60.	4 March 1995	Jönköping, Sweden	Norway	4–1	4–1	UEFA Women's Euro 1995	
61.	14 March 1995	Lagos, Portugal	Italy	1–0	4–0	1995 Algarve Cup	
62.	14 March 1995	Lagos, Portugal	Italy	3–0	4–0	1995 Algarve Cup	
63.	9 June 1995	Västerås, Sweden	Japan	1–0	2–0	1995 FIFA Women's World Cup	
64.	2 June 1996	Gandia, Spain	Spain	5–0	8–0	UEFA Women's Euro 1997 qualifying	
65.	2 June 1996	Gandia, Spain	Spain	8–0	8–0	UEFA Women's Euro 1997 qualifying	
66.	26 June 1996	Câmpina, Romania	Romania	3–0	5–0	UEFA Women's Euro 1997 qualifying	
67.	26 June 1996	Câmpina, Romania	Romania	5–0	5–0	UEFA Women's Euro 1997 qualifying	
68.	15 July 1996	Miami, United States	Japan	2–1	3–1	Friendly	
69.	23 July 1996	Orlando, United States	United States	1–2	1–2	1996 Summer Olympics	
70.	25 July 1996	Orlando, United States	Denmark	3–0	3–1	1996 Summer Olympics	
71.	31 August 1996	Västerås, Sweden	Denmark	2–0	2–0	UEFA Women's Euro 1997 qualifying	

== Personal life ==
Videkull is a lesbian and lives with her partner Nina and their daughter, Felicia.
