= Pärnilla Larsson =

Swedish footballer

Personal information
- Date of birth: 19 February 1969 (age 57)
- Position: Midfielder

Senior career*
Years	Team	Apps	(Gls)
- Gideonsbergs IF

International career^{‡}
1988–1994	Sweden	29	(3)
- * Club domestic league appearances and goals ‡ National team caps and goals as of 16 November 1991 (before the 1991 FIFA Women's World Cup)

Pärnilla Larsson (born 19 February 1969) is a Swedish footballer who played as a midfielder for the Sweden women's national football team. She was part of the team at the 1991 FIFA Women's World Cup. At the club level, she played for Gideonsbergs IF in Sweden.
