= Ing-Marie Olsson =

Swedish footballer

Personal information
- Date of birth: 23 February 1966 (age 60)
- Position: Goalkeeper

Senior career*
Years	Team	Apps	(Gls)
- Malmö FF

International career^{‡}
- Sweden
- * Club domestic league appearances and goals ‡ National team caps and goals as of 16 November 1991 (before the 1991 FIFA Women's World Cup)

Ing-Marie Olsson (born 23 February 1966) is a Swedish footballer who played as a goalkeeper for the Sweden women's national football team. She was part of the team at the inaugural 1991 FIFA Women's World Cup. At the club level she played for Malmö FF in Sweden. Her first club was Löberöds IF.
