= Susanne Hedberg =

Swedish footballer

Personal information
- Full name: Susanne Hedberg
- Date of birth: 26 June 1972 (age 54)
- Place of birth: Sweden
- Position: Midfielder

Senior career*
Years	Team	Apps	(Gls)
- Sunnanå SK
1992–1997	Gideonsbergs IF		

International career^{‡}
	Sweden	55	(7)
- * Club domestic league appearances and goals ‡ National team caps and goals as of 2017

Susanne Hedberg (born 26 June 1972) is a Swedish former international footballer who played as a midfielder. She played for Sweden at the 1991 FIFA Women's World Cup and 1995 FIFA Women's World Cup. She scored against Brazil in the 1991 World Cup.
