= Henry Fok Stadium =

Sports venue in Guangzhou, China

Coordinates: 22°56′45″N 113°21′08″E

英东体育场 Henry Fok Stadium
- Interactive map of 英东体育场; Henry Fok Stadium
- Former names: Ying Tung Stadium
- Location: Guangzhou, China
- Owner: Guangzhou Sports Bureau
- Capacity: 14,818
- Surface: Grass

Construction
- Built: 1986
- Opened: March 1988
- Cost: CNY5.22 million

Henry Fok Stadium (Chinese: 英东体育场) is a multi-purpose stadium in Panyu, China. It is currently used mostly for football matches and was one of the six stadiums used for the 1991 FIFA Women's World Cup. The stadium has a capacity of 15,000 people.

It is named after Henry Fok Ying Tung, a businessman who left a large amount of money for this constructions.

== 1991 FIFA Women's World Cup matches ==
Date	Competition	Team	Res	Team	Crowd
17 November 1991	Group B	Sweden	2–3	United States	14,000
19 November 1991	Group B	Brazil	0–5	United States	15,500
21 November 1991	Group A	Norway	2–1	Denmark	15,500
21 November 1991	Group B	Brazil	0–2	Sweden	12,000
27 November 1991	Semi-finals	Sweden	1–4	Norway	16,000
