= Camilla Svensson-Gustafsson =

Swedish footballer

Personal information
- Date of birth: 20 January 1969 (age 57)
- Place of birth: Sweden
- Position: Defender

Senior career*
Years	Team	Apps	(Gls)
1996	Jitex BK/JG93		

International career
1996	Sweden	30 (?)	
- * Club domestic league appearances and goals

Camilla Marie Svensson-Gustafsson (born 20 January 1969) was a female Swedish football defender. She was part of the Sweden women's national football team.

She competed at the 1996 Summer Olympics, playing 3 matches. On club level she played for Jitex BK/JG93.

== See also ==
- Sweden at the 1996 Summer Olympics
