= Gunilla Paijkull =

Swedish footballer and coach (born 1943)

Personal information
- Full name: Gunilla Elisabeth Paijkull
- Date of birth: 5 September 1943 (age 83)
- Place of birth: Nyköping, Sweden
- Position: Midfielder

Senior career*
Years	Team	Apps	(Gls)
1969–1970	Tyresö FF		
1971–1972	AIK		
1973–1977	Hammarby IF		

Managerial career
- 1978–1981: Hammarby IF
- Tyresö FF
- 1988–1991: Sweden women
- * Club domestic league appearances and goals

Gunilla Elisabeth Paijkull (born 5 September 1943) is a Swedish football coach and former player. She was head coach of the Sweden women's national football team at the 1991 FIFA Women's World Cup.

Paijkull, previously Gunilla Karlsson, was a football player with the Stockholm club AIK. In 1971, she was one of three AIK players called up for an unofficial Sweden team's friendly match against Denmark in Copenhagen.

She began playing for Hammarby IF in 1973 and was appointed head coach of the team in 1978.

Paijkull took over as the Sweden women's national team coach in 1988, ahead of the 1988 FIFA Women's Invitation Tournament in which Sweden finished runners-up to Norway. She was the first woman to coach a national football team. At the inaugural 1991 FIFA Women's World Cup in China, Paijkull, the only female coach among the 12 finalists, guided Sweden to a third-place finish. She was also the first female manager whose team defeated an opponent managed by a male counterpart in a World Cup match.

After leaving her position as national team coach Paijkull became a FIFA instructor. She served on FIFA's technical study group at the 1996 Atlanta Olympics, as well as at the 1995 and 1999 editions of the FIFA Women's World Cup.

Paijkull is of Estonian heritage. In 2013, she was serving on the board of Tyresö FF.

== Bibliography ==
- Lopez, Sue (1997). Women on the Ball: A Guide to Women's Football. London, England: Scarlet Press. ISBN 1857270169.
