= New Plaza Stadium =

Sports venue in Foshan, China

Coordinates: 23°02′00″N 113°06′30″E

- Interactive map of New Plaza Stadium
- Location: Foshan, China
- Owner: City of Foshan
- Capacity: 14,000
- Surface: Grass

Construction
- Opened: 1991
- Closed: 2007
- Demolished: 2007

New Plaza Stadium
- Simplified Chinese: 佛山新广场体育场
- Traditional Chinese: 佛山新廣場體育場
Transcriptions
Standard Mandarin
- Hanyu Pinyin: Fóshān Xīn Guǎngchǎng Tǐyùchǎng
Yue: Cantonese
- Jyutping: fat6 saan1 san1 gwong2 coeng4 tai2 juk6 coeng4

New Plaza Stadium (Chinese: 佛山新广场体育场) was a multi-use stadium in Foshan, China. It was used mostly for football matches and was one of the six stadiums used for the 1991 FIFA Women's World Cup. The stadium had a capacity of 14,000 people.

== 1991 FIFA Women's World Cup matches ==
Date	Competition	Team	Res	Team	Crowd
17 November 1991	Group B	Japan	0–1	Brazil	14,000
19 November 1991	Group B	Japan	0–8	Sweden	14,000
21 November 1991	Group A	China	4–1	New Zealand	14,000
21 November 1991	Group B	Japan	0–3	United States	14,000
24 November 1991	Quarter-finals	United States	7–0	Chinese Taipei	12,000
