= Elisabeth Leidinge =

Swedish footballer (born 1957)

Personal information
- Full name: Elisabeth Leidinge
- Date of birth: 9 May 1957 (age 69)
- Place of birth: Sundsvall, Sweden
- Position: Goalkeeper

Youth career
- Kema Nord

Senior career*
Years	Team	Apps	(Gls)
1973–1978	GIF Sundsvall		
1979–1991	Jitex BK		
1992–1995	Malmö FF Dam		

International career^{‡}
1974–1995	Sweden	112	(0)
- * Club domestic league appearances and goals ‡ National team caps and goals as of 18 October 2007

Elisabeth Leidinge (born 6 March 1957) is a Swedish former association football goalkeeper who won 112 caps for the Sweden women's national football team. She is nicknamed "Lappen". Leidinge can be seen in the Sveriges Television documentary television series The Other Sport from 2013.

== International career ==
Leidinge made her senior Sweden debut in the team's third ever match; a 1–0 defeat by Denmark in Finland on 27 July 1974. She won the first UEFA championships for national women's teams in 1984. Sweden beat England in the final, Leidinge saving twice in the penalty shootout at Kenilworth Road after a 1–1 aggregate draw. In 1991 Leidinge helped Sweden to a third-place finish at the inaugural FIFA Women's World Cup, where she was called one of the tournament's top keepers. The same year, she was given the Diamantbollen award for the best Swedish female footballer of the year. She retired after keeping goal for Sweden in the 1995 FIFA Women's World Cup, which they hosted.
