= EC Radar =

Radar
- Full name: Esporte Clube Radar
- Founded: 1981
- Dissolved: 1991
- President: Eurico Lira
Home colours	Away colours

Esporte Clube Radar was a Brazilian professional women's association football club, based in the Copacabana neighbourhood of Rio de Janeiro, Brazil. Founded as a beach football side in 1981 and restructured for association football in 1982, Radar enjoyed unprecedented success in the early days of women's football in Brazil, winning both the Taça Brasil de Futebol Feminino and the Campeonato Carioca de Futebol Feminino on six consecutive occasions during the 1980s and at one point claiming a record of only four losses in more than 300 matches played. Additionally, they would barnstorm in high-profile televised challenge matches against other Brazilian women's teams.

The club functioned as the Brazil women's national football team at the 1986 Mundialito and the 1988 FIFA Women's Invitation Tournament.

== History ==
Eurico Lira, a promoter and entrepreneur, owned the Radar Sports Club on the Copacabana, which had been founded in 1932. Lira founded a beach football section in 1981, then dissolved it in favor of a dedicated women's football side in 1982. Eurico Lira drew players from Copacabana's beach football scene and inland players, as well as from other sports; goalkeeper Meg was a handball player before being recruited by Radar.

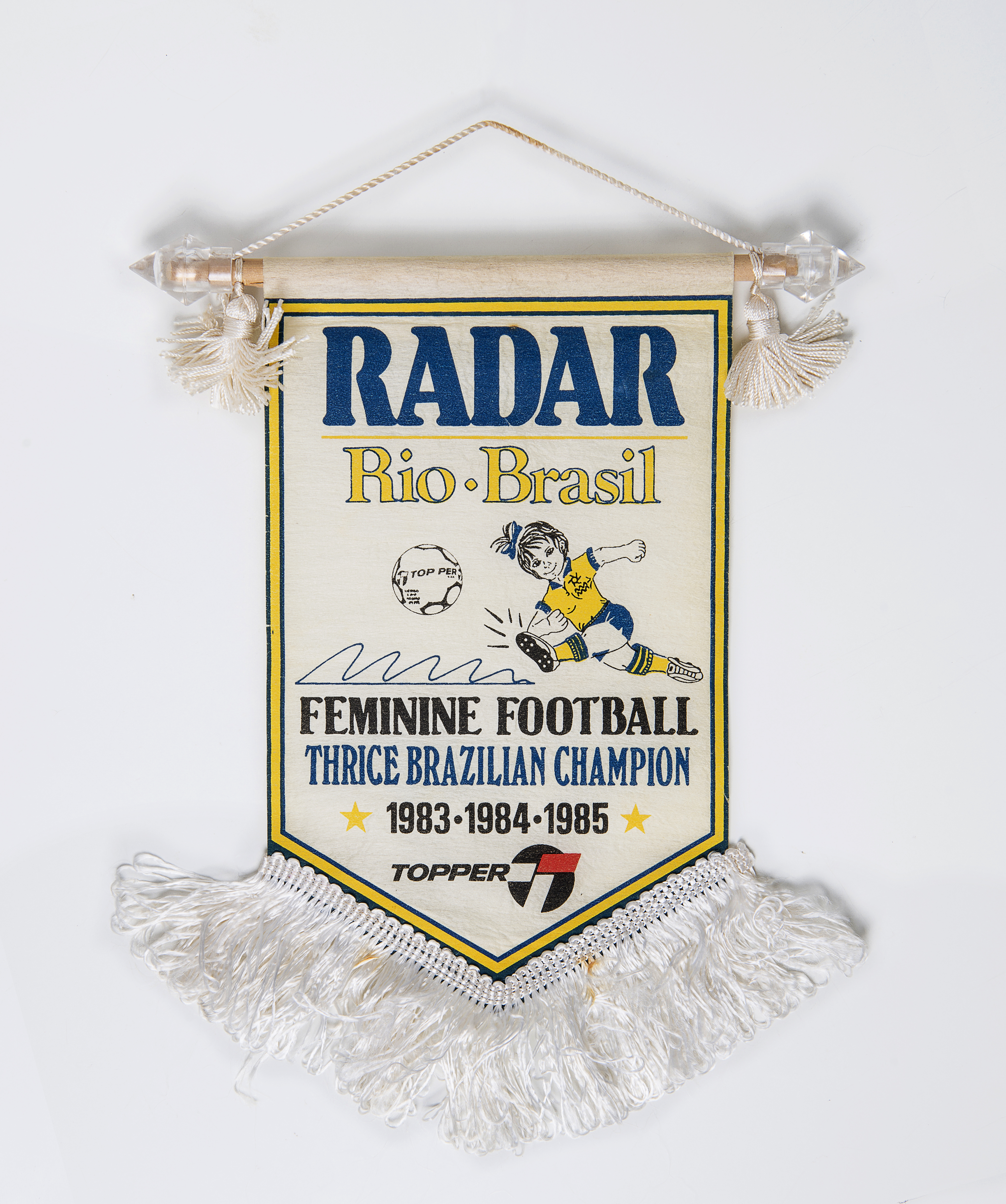
Radar pennant from 1985

In 1983 a local rivalry developed with the women's team of Bangu Atlético Clube, who were put together by gambling baron Castor de Andrade. After the referee failed to award Bangu a penalty in the away match at Estádio Moça Bonita the situation descended into violent disorder involving players, staff, match officials, journalists and spectators. The referee and his assistants had to leave the stadium under armed guard, while Radar's full-back Rosa suffered a broken jaw.

The final of the 1983 Taça Brasil de Futebol Feminino at Estádio da Rua Bariri also erupted into violence. Radar's opponents Goiás were upset by the antics of flamboyant referee, Jorge José Emiliano dos Santos.

As of 1984, players were paid CR$45–60,000 (US$23.75–$31.65) per month, or near the minimum wage at the time, while some players were not paid at all. However, Eurico Lira — an attorney by trade — also provided players with jobs, legal assistance, and apartments. The club's sponsors included Unibanco and Banco do Estado do Rio de Janeiro, and in 1984 the team generated CR$6,000,000 per month in sponsorship and CR$500,000 per match.

Eurico Lira funded a club tour to the United States by selling two of his Manabu Mabe paintings for below their estimated value. In 1988 Lira got Brazilian Football Confederation (CBF) authorisation to represent Brazil at the 1988 FIFA Women's Invitation Tournament, but no additional funding, so he again paid the expenses of the team, who finished third.

All but two of the Brazil squad picked for the 1991 FIFA Women's World Cup were contracted to Radar. Lira, who had attended the tournament as the CBF women's football co-ordinator, left his position after the World Cup. Placar magazine reported that one of the players, Marcinha, had accused Lira of embarking upon a sexual affair with another player.

Lira died in 1997, from injuries inflicted during the course of a robbery at the Radar Club.

== Honours ==
=== National ===
- Taça Brasil de Futebol Feminino
  - Winners (6): 1983, 1984, 1985, 1986, 1987, 1988

=== State ===
- Campeonato Carioca
  - Winners (6): 1983, 1984, 1985, 1986, 1987, 1988
