= Football at the 1996 Summer Olympics – Women's team squads =

The women's football tournament at the 1996 Summer Olympics in Atlanta was held from 21 July to 1 August 1996. The women's tournament was a full international tournament with no restrictions on age. The eight national teams involved in the tournament were required to register a squad of 16 players, including two goalkeepers. Additionally, teams could name a maximum of four alternate players, numbered from 17 to 20. The alternate list could contain at most three outfielders, as at least one slot was reserved for a goalkeeper. In the event of serious injury during the tournament, an injured player could be replaced by one of the players in the alternate list. Only players in these squads were eligible to take part in the tournament.

The age listed for each player is on 21 July 1996, the first day of the tournament. The numbers of caps and goals listed for each player do not include any matches played after the start of the tournament. The club listed is the club for which the player last played a competitive match prior to the tournament.

== Group E ==
=== China PR ===
Head coach: Ma Yuanan

China PR named a squad of 16 players and 4 alternates for the tournament.

| No. | Pos. | Player | Date of birth (age) | Caps | Goals | Club |
|---|---|---|---|---|---|---|
| 1 | GK | Zhong Honglian | 27 October 1967 (aged 28) | | | |
| 2 | DF | Wang Liping | 12 November 1973 (aged 22) | | | |
| 3 | DF | Fan Yunjie | 29 April 1972 (aged 24) | | | |
| 4 | DF | Yu Hongqi | 2 February 1973 (aged 23) | | | |
| 5 | DF | Xie Huilin | 17 January 1975 (aged 21) | | | |
| 6 | MF | Zhao Lihong | 25 December 1972 (aged 23) | | | |
| 7 | FW | Wei Haiying | 1 May 1971 (aged 25) | | | |
| 8 | MF | Shui Qingxia | 18 December 1966 (aged 29) | | | |
| 9 | MF | Sun Wen (captain) | 6 April 1973 (aged 23) | | | |
| 10 | MF | Liu Ailing | 2 May 1967 (aged 29) | | | |
| 11 | FW | Sun Qingmei | 19 June 1966 (aged 30) | | | |
| 12 | DF | Wen Lirong | 2 October 1969 (aged 26) | | | (Japan Football Association) Prima Ham FC Ku-No-Ichi |
| 13 | MF | Liu Ying | 11 June 1974 (aged 22) | | | |
| 14 | MF | Chen Yufeng | 17 January 1970 (aged 26) | | | |
| 15 | FW | Shi Guihong | 13 February 1968 (aged 28) | | | |
| 16 | GK | Gao Hong | 27 November 1967 (aged 28) | | | |

Unenrolled alternate players
| No. | Pos. | Player | Date of birth (age) | Caps | Goals | Club |
|---|---|---|---|---|---|---|
| 17 | | Li Yating | | | | |
| 18 | FW | Zhang Yan | 6 August 1972 (aged 23) | | | |
| 19 | GK | Zhao Yan | 7 May 1972 (aged 24) | | | |
| 20 | DF | Niu Lijie | 12 April 1969 (aged 27) | | | |

=== Denmark ===
Head coach: Keld Gantzhorn

Denmark named a squad of 16 players and 3 alternates for the tournament.

| No. | Pos. | Player | Date of birth (age) | Caps | Goals | Club |
|---|---|---|---|---|---|---|
| 1 | GK | Dorthe Larsen | 8 August 1969 (aged 26) | 31 | | (Danish Football Association) Fortuna Hjørring |
| 2 | DF | Annette Laursen | 26 February 1975 (aged 21) | 17 | | (Danish Football Association) HEI Århus |
| 3 | DF | Bonny Madsen | 10 August 1967 (aged 28) | 55 | | (Italian Football Federation) Lugo |
| 4 | DF | Kamma Flæng | 30 March 1976 (aged 20) | 21 | | (Danish Football Association) HEI Århus |
| 5 | DF | Rikke Holm | 22 March 1972 (aged 24) | 39 | | (Danish Football Association) HEI Århus |
| 6 | MF | Christina Petersen | 17 September 1974 (aged 21) | 24 | | (Danish Football Association) Fortuna Hjørring |
| 7 | MF | Birgit Christensen | 31 May 1976 (aged 20) | 24 | | (Danish Football Association) Fortuna Hjørring |
| 8 | MF | Lisbet Kolding | 6 April 1965 (aged 31) | 64 | | (Danish Football Association) HEI Århus |
| 9 | FW | Helle Jensen (captain) | 23 March 1969 (aged 27) | 74 | | (Danish Football Association) Fortuna Hjørring |
| 10 | FW | Gitte Krogh | 13 May 1977 (aged 19) | 28 | | (Danish Football Association) HEI Århus |
| 11 | FW | Lene Madsen | 11 March 1973 (aged 23) | 26 | | (Danish Football Association) Fortuna Hjørring |
| 12 | DF | Lene Terp | 15 April 1973 (aged 23) | 26 | | (Danish Football Association) Vejle B |
| 13 | MF | Anne Dot Eggers Nielsen | 6 November 1975 (aged 20) | 30 | | (Danish Football Association) HEI Århus |
| 14 | MF | Merete Pedersen | 30 June 1973 (aged 23) | 10 | | (Danish Football Association) OB |
| 15 | FW | Christina Bonde | 28 September 1973 (aged 22) | 15 | | (Danish Football Association) Fortuna Hjørring |
| 16 | GK | Helle Bjerregaard | 21 June 1968 (aged 28) | 56 | | (Danish Football Association) Rødovre BK |

Unenrolled alternate players
| No. | Pos. | Player | Date of birth (age) | Caps | Goals | Club |
|---|---|---|---|---|---|---|
| 17 | GK | Christina Jensen | 21 January 1974 (aged 22) | 1 | | (Danish Football Association) OB |
| 18 | MF | Louise Hansen | 4 May 1975 (aged 21) | 6 | | (German Football Association) TSV Siegen |
| 19 | FW | Irene Stelling | 25 July 1971 (aged 24) | 49 | | (United States Soccer Federation) Hartford Hawks |

=== Sweden ===
Head coach: Bengt Simonsson

Sweden named a squad of 16 players and 4 alternates for the tournament.

| No. | Pos. | Player | Date of birth (age) | Caps | Goals | Club |
|---|---|---|---|---|---|---|
| 1 | GK | Annelie Nilsson | 14 June 1971 (aged 25) | 23 | 0 | (Swedish Football Association) Sunnanå SK |
| 2 | DF | Cecilia Sandell | 10 June 1968 (aged 28) | 14 | 0 | (Swedish Football Association) Älvsjö AIK |
| 3 | DF | Åsa Jakobsson | 2 June 1966 (aged 30) | 52 | 1 | (Swedish Football Association) Gideonsberg IF |
| 4 | DF | Annika Nessvold | 24 February 1971 (aged 25) | 31 | 6 | (Swedish Football Association) Malmö FF |
| 5 | DF | Kristin Bengtsson | 12 January 1970 (aged 26) | 46 | 2 | (Norwegian Football Federation) FK Athene Moss |
| 6 | MF | Anna Pohjanen | 25 January 1974 (aged 22) | 23 | 7 | (Swedish Football Association) Sunnanå SK |
| 7 | MF | Pia Sundhage (captain) | 13 February 1960 (aged 36) | 141 | 69 | (Swedish Football Association) Hammarby IF |
| 8 | MF | Malin Swedberg | 15 September 1968 (aged 27) | 48 | 3 | (Swedish Football Association) Älvsjö AIK |
| 9 | MF | Malin Andersson | 4 May 1973 (aged 23) | 33 | 14 | (Swedish Football Association) Älvsjö AIK |
| 10 | MF | Ulrika Kalte | 19 May 1970 (aged 26) | 52 | 20 | (Swedish Football Association) Älvsjö AIK |
| 11 | FW | Lena Videkull | 9 December 1962 (aged 33) | 105 | 65 | (Swedish Football Association) Malmö FF |
| 12 | GK | Ulrika Karlsson | 14 October 1970 (aged 25) | 5 | 0 | (Swedish Football Association) Bälinge IF |
| 13 | DF | Camilla Svensson-Gustafsson | 20 January 1969 (aged 27) | 16 | 0 | (Swedish Football Association) Jitex BK/JG93 |
| 14 | FW | Maria Kun | 17 April 1973 (aged 23) | 3 | 0 | (Swedish Football Association) Gideonsberg IF |
| 15 | FW | Julia Carlsson | 8 April 1975 (aged 21) | 5 | 0 | (Swedish Football Association) Älvsjö AIK |
| 16 | FW | Hanna Ljungberg | 8 January 1979 (aged 17) | 3 | 1 | (Swedish Football Association) Sunnanå SK |

Unenrolled alternate players
| No. | Pos. | Player | Date of birth (age) | Caps | Goals | Club |
|---|---|---|---|---|---|---|
| 17 | GK | Eva Larsson | 27 February 1973 (aged 23) | 0 | 0 | |
| 18 | DF | Åsa Lönnqvist | 14 April 1970 (aged 26) | 27 | 1 | |
| 19 | MF | Pernilla Bowall | 16 August 1972 (aged 23) | 7 | 0 | (Swedish Football Association) Jitex BK/JG 93 |
| 20 | FW | Anneli Wahlgren | 15 January 1971 (aged 25) | 10 | 3 | (Swedish Football Association) Bälinge IF |

=== United States ===
Head coach: Tony DiCicco

The United States named a squad of 16 players and 4 alternates for the tournament. Lorrie Fair was invited to the squad as an alternate, but declined due to her disappointment of not making the team.

| No. | Pos. | Player | Date of birth (age) | Caps | Goals | Club |
|---|---|---|---|---|---|---|
| 1 | GK | Briana Scurry | 7 September 1971 (aged 24) | 41 | 0 | |
| 2 | GK | Mary Harvey | 4 June 1965 (aged 31) | | 0 | |
| 3 | FW | Cindy Parlow | 8 May 1978 (aged 18) | | 8 | (United States Soccer Federation) North Carolina Tar Heels |
| 4 | DF | Carla Overbeck (captain) | 9 May 1968 (aged 28) | 95 | 7 | |
| 5 | MF | Tiffany Roberts | 5 May 1977 (aged 19) | 49 | 6 | (United States Soccer Federation) North Carolina Tar Heels |
| 6 | DF | Brandi Chastain | 21 July 1968 (aged 28) | 36 | 9 | |
| 7 | DF | Staci Wilson | 8 July 1976 (aged 20) | | 0 | (United States Soccer Federation) North Carolina Tar Heels |
| 8 | MF | Shannon MacMillan | 7 October 1974 (aged 21) | 23 | 6 | (Japan Football Association) Shiroki FC Serena |
| 9 | FW | Mia Hamm | 17 March 1972 (aged 24) | 116 | 62 | |
| 10 | FW | Michelle Akers | 1 February 1966 (aged 30) | 104 | 92 | |
| 11 | MF | Julie Foudy | 23 January 1971 (aged 25) | 91 | 16 | |
| 12 | FW | Carin Jennings-Gabarra | 9 January 1965 (aged 31) | 113 | 53 | |
| 13 | MF | Kristine Lilly | 22 July 1971 (aged 24) | 116 | 45 | |
| 14 | DF | Joy Fawcett | 8 February 1968 (aged 28) | 96 | 15 | (United States Soccer Federation) Ajax of Manhattan Beach |
| 15 | MF | Tisha Venturini | 3 March 1973 (aged 23) | 66 | 25 | |
| 16 | FW | Tiffeny Milbrett | 23 October 1972 (aged 23) | 60 | 23 | (Japan Football Association) Shiroki FC Serena |

Unenrolled alternate players
| No. | Pos. | Player | Date of birth (age) | Caps | Goals | Club |
|---|---|---|---|---|---|---|
| 17 | MF | Amanda Cromwell | 15 June 1970 (aged 26) | | 1 | |
| 18 | DF | Thori Staples | 17 April 1974 (aged 22) | | 0 | |
| 19 | MF | Jen Streiffer | 25 May 1978 (aged 18) | 0 | 0 | (United States Soccer Federation) Notre Dame Fighting Irish |
| 20 | GK | Saskia Webber | 13 June 1971 (aged 25) | | 0 | |

== Group F ==
=== Brazil ===
Head coach: José Duarte

Brazil named a squad of 16 players and 4 alternates for the tournament. During the tournament, Kátia replaced Nilda due to injury.

| No. | Pos. | Player | Date of birth (age) | Caps | Goals | Club |
|---|---|---|---|---|---|---|
| 1 | GK | Meg | 1 January 1956 (aged 40) | | | (Brazilian Football Confederation) Vasco da Gama |
| 2 | DF | Nenê | 31 March 1976 (aged 20) | | | (Brazilian Football Confederation) Saad EC |
| 3 | DF | Suzy | 7 February 1967 (aged 29) | | | (Brazilian Football Confederation) Vasco da Gama |
| 4 | MF | Fanta | 14 September 1966 (aged 29) | | | (Brazilian Football Confederation) Vasco da Gama |
| 5 | MF | Márcia Taffarel | 15 May 1968 (aged 28) | | | (Brazilian Football Confederation) Saad EC |
| 6 | DF | Elane | 4 June 1968 (aged 28) | | | (Brazilian Football Confederation) Euroexport |
| 7 | FW | Pretinha | 19 May 1975 (aged 21) | | | (Brazilian Football Confederation) Vasco da Gama |
| 8 | MF | Formiga | 3 March 1978 (aged 18) | | | (Brazilian Football Confederation) Saad EC |
| 9 | FW | Michael Jackson | 19 November 1963 (aged 32) | | | (Italian Football Federation) Torino CF |
| 10 | MF | Sissi (captain) | 2 June 1967 (aged 29) | | | (Brazilian Football Confederation) Saad EC |
| 11 | FW | Roseli | 7 September 1969 (aged 26) | | | (Japan Football Association) Takarazuka Bunnys |
| 12 | GK | Didi | 22 September 1963 (aged 32) | | | (Brazilian Football Confederation) Saad EC |
| 13 | DF | Marisa | 10 September 1966 (aged 29) | | | Unattached |
| 14 | FW | Tânia | 3 October 1974 (aged 21) | | | (Brazilian Football Confederation) Saad EC |
| 15 | MF | Nilda | 25 March 1972 (aged 24) | | | (Brazilian Football Confederation) Saad EC |
| 16 | DF | Sônia | 4 August 1968 (aged 27) | | | (Brazilian Football Confederation) Ítalo Serrano |
| 19 | MF | Kátia | 18 February 1977 (aged 19) | | | (Brazilian Football Confederation) Saad EC |

Unenrolled alternate players
| No. | Pos. | Player | Date of birth (age) | Caps | Goals | Club |
|---|---|---|---|---|---|---|
| 17 | MF | Russa | 12 February 1963 (aged 33) | | | |
| 18 | MF | Leda Maria | 16 April 1966 (aged 30) | | | |
| 20 | GK | Maravilha | 10 April 1973 (aged 23) | | | |

=== Germany ===
Head coach: Gero Bisanz

Germany named a squad of 16 players and 4 alternates for the tournament.

| No. | Pos. | Player | Date of birth (age) | Caps | Goals | Club |
|---|---|---|---|---|---|---|
| 1 | GK | Manuela Goller | 5 January 1971 (aged 25) | 42 | | (German Football Association) Grün-Weiß Brauweiler |
| 2 | DF | Jutta Nardenbach | 13 August 1968 (aged 27) | 56 | | (German Football Association) TuS Ahrbach |
| 3 | DF | Birgitt Austermühl | 8 October 1965 (aged 30) | 55 | | (German Football Association) FSV Frankfurt |
| 4 | DF | Kerstin Stegemann | 29 September 1977 (aged 18) | 9 | | (German Football Association) FC Eintracht Rheine |
| 5 | DF | Doris Fitschen | 25 October 1968 (aged 27) | 81 | | (German Football Association) TSV Siegen |
| 6 | MF | Dagmar Pohlmann | 7 February 1972 (aged 24) | 36 | | (German Football Association) FSV Frankfurt |
| 7 | MF | Martina Voss | 22 December 1967 (aged 28) | 89 | | (German Football Association) FC Rumeln-Kaldenhausen |
| 8 | MF | Bettina Wiegmann | 7 October 1971 (aged 24) | 67 | | (German Football Association) Grün-Weiß Brauweiler |
| 9 | FW | Heidi Mohr | 29 May 1967 (aged 29) | 101 | | (German Football Association) TuS Niederkirchen |
| 10 | MF | Silvia Neid (captain) | 2 May 1964 (aged 32) | 108 | | (German Football Association) TSV Siegen |
| 11 | FW | Patricia Brocker | 7 April 1966 (aged 30) | 43 | | (German Football Association) TuS Niederkirchen |
| 12 | GK | Katja Kraus | 23 November 1970 (aged 25) | 6 | | (German Football Association) FSV Frankfurt |
| 13 | DF | Sandra Minnert | 7 April 1973 (aged 23) | 28 | | (German Football Association) FSV Frankfurt |
| 14 | MF | Pia Wunderlich | 26 January 1975 (aged 21) | 19 | | (German Football Association) SG Praunheim |
| 15 | FW | Birgit Prinz | 25 October 1977 (aged 18) | 25 | | (German Football Association) FSV Frankfurt |
| 16 | MF | Renate Lingor | 11 October 1975 (aged 20) | 5 | | (German Football Association) SC Klinge Seckach |

Unenrolled alternate players
| No. | Pos. | Player | Date of birth (age) | Caps | Goals | Club |
|---|---|---|---|---|---|---|
| 17 | DF | Tina Wunderlich | 10 October 1977 (aged 18) | 6 | | (German Football Association) SG Praunheim |
| 18 | FW | Katja Bornschein | 16 March 1972 (aged 24) | 31 | | (German Football Association) FSV Frankfurt |
| 19 | MF | Sandra Smisek | 3 July 1977 (aged 19) | 9 | | (German Football Association) FSV Frankfurt |
| 20 | GK | Christine Francke | 12 June 1974 (aged 22) | 2 | | |

=== Japan ===
Head coach: Tamotsu Suzuki

Japan named a squad of 16 players and 4 alternates for the tournament.

| No. | Pos. | Player | Date of birth (age) | Caps | Goals | Club |
|---|---|---|---|---|---|---|
| 1 | GK | Junko Ozawa | 7 December 1973 (aged 22) | | | (Japan Football Association) Fujita SC Mercury |
| 2 | DF | Yumi Tomei | 1 June 1972 (aged 24) | | | (Japan Football Association) Prima Ham FC Ku-No-Ichi |
| 3 | DF | Rie Yamaki | 2 October 1975 (aged 20) | | | (Japan Football Association) Nikko Securities Dream Ladies |
| 4 | DF | Maki Haneta | 30 September 1972 (aged 23) | | | (Japan Football Association) Matsushita Panasonic Bambina |
| 5 | DF | Yumi Obe | 15 February 1975 (aged 21) | | | (Japan Football Association) Nikko Securities Dream Ladies |
| 6 | DF | Kae Nishina | 7 December 1972 (aged 23) | | | (Japan Football Association) Prima Ham FC Ku-No-Ichi |
| 7 | MF | Homare Sawa | 6 September 1978 (aged 17) | | | (Japan Football Association) Yomiuri-Seiyu Beleza |
| 8 | MF | Asako Takakura | 19 April 1968 (aged 28) | | | (Japan Football Association) Yomiuri-Seiyu Beleza |
| 9 | MF | Futaba Kioka | 22 November 1965 (aged 30) | | | (Japan Football Association) Suzuyo Shimizu F.C. Lovely Ladies |
| 10 | FW | Akemi Noda (captain) | 13 October 1969 (aged 26) | | | (Japan Football Association) Takarazuka Bunnys Ladies SC |
| 11 | MF | Etsuko Handa | 10 May 1965 (aged 31) | | | (Japan Football Association) Suzuyo Shimizu F.C. Lovely Ladies |
| 12 | FW | Tamaki Uchiyama | 13 December 1972 (aged 23) | | | (Japan Football Association) Prima Ham FC Ku-No-Ichi |
| 13 | MF | Nami Otake | 30 July 1974 (aged 21) | | | (Japan Football Association) Yomiuri-Seiyu Beleza |
| 14 | MF | Kaoru Kadohara | 25 May 1970 (aged 26) | | | (Japan Football Association) Matsushita Panasonic Bambina |
| 15 | FW | Miyuki Izumi | 31 March 1973 (aged 23) | | | (Japan Football Association) Suzuyo Shimizu F.C. Lovely Ladies |
| 16 | GK | Shiho Onodera | 18 November 1973 (aged 22) | | | (Japan Football Association) Yomiuri-Seiyu Beleza |

Unenrolled alternate players
| No. | Pos. | Player | Date of birth (age) | Caps | Goals | Club |
|---|---|---|---|---|---|---|
| 17 | DF | Rie Kimura | 30 July 1971 (aged 24) | | | (Japan Football Association) Matsushita Electric Panasonic Bambina |
| 18 | FW | Kaori Nagamine | 3 June 1968 (aged 28) | | | (Japan Football Association) Suzuyo Shimizu F.C. Lovely Ladies |
| 19 | GK | Megumi Sakata | 18 October 1971 (aged 24) | | | |
| 20 | DF | Ryoko Uno | 9 November 1975 (aged 20) | | | (Japan Football Association) Yomiuri-Seiyu Beleza |

=== Norway ===
Head coach: Even Pellerud

Norway named a squad of 16 players and 3 alternates for the tournament. During the tournament, Tone Gunn Frustøl replaced Heidi Støre due to injury.

| No. | Pos. | Player | Date of birth (age) | Caps | Goals | Club |
|---|---|---|---|---|---|---|
| 1 | GK | Bente Nordby | 23 July 1974 (aged 21) | | | (Norwegian Football Federation) Athene Moss |
| 2 | DF | Agnete Carlsen | 15 January 1971 (aged 25) | | | (Japan Football Association) Nikko |
| 3 | DF | Gro Espeseth (captain) | 30 October 1972 (aged 23) | | | (Norwegian Football Federation) Sandviken |
| 4 | DF | Nina Nymark Andersen | 28 September 1972 (aged 23) | | | (Norwegian Football Federation) Sandviken |
| 5 | DF | Merete Myklebust | 16 May 1973 (aged 23) | | | (Norwegian Football Federation) Trondheims-Ørn |
| 6 | MF | Hege Riise | 18 July 1969 (aged 27) | | | (Japan Football Association) Nikko |
| 7 | FW | Anne Nymark Andersen | 28 September 1972 (aged 23) | | | (Norwegian Football Federation) Sandviken |
| 8 | MF | Heidi Støre | 4 July 1963 (aged 33) | | | (Japan Football Association) Nikko |
| 9 | FW | Marianne Pettersen | 12 April 1975 (aged 21) | | | (Norwegian Football Federation) Gjelleråsen |
| 10 | FW | Linda Medalen | 17 June 1965 (aged 31) | | | (Japan Football Association) Nikko |
| 11 | FW | Brit Sandaune | 5 June 1972 (aged 24) | | | (Norwegian Football Federation) Trondheims-Ørn |
| 12 | GK | Reidun Seth | 9 June 1966 (aged 30) | | | (Swedish Football Association) Öxabäck IF |
| 13 | DF | Tina Svensson | 16 November 1966 (aged 29) | | | (Norwegian Football Federation) Asker |
| 14 | MF | Tone Haugen | 6 February 1964 (aged 32) | | | (Japan Football Association) Nikko |
| 15 | MF | Trine Tangeraas | 26 February 1971 (aged 25) | | | (Norwegian Football Federation) Sandviken |
| 16 | FW | Ann Kristin Aarønes | 19 January 1973 (aged 23) | | | (Norwegian Football Federation) SK Trondheims-Ørn |
| 17 | MF | Tone Gunn Frustøl | 21 June 1975 (aged 21) | | | (Norwegian Football Federation) Asker SK |

Unenrolled alternate players
| No. | Pos. | Player | Date of birth (age) | Caps | Goals | Club |
|---|---|---|---|---|---|---|
| 18 | FW | Kjersti Thun | 18 June 1974 (aged 22) | | | (Norwegian Football Federation) Asker SK |
| 19 | GK | Ingrid Sternhoff | 25 February 1977 (aged 19) | | | (Norwegian Football Federation) Haugar |
