= 1995 FIFA Women's World Cup Group A =

Football tournament group stage

Group A of the 1995 FIFA Women's World Cup took place from 5 to 9 June 1995. The group consisted of Brazil, Germany, Japan and hosts Sweden.

== Standings ==
Pos	Team	Pld	W	D	L	GF	GA	GD	Pts	Qualification
1	Germany	3	2	0	1	9	4	+5	6	Advance to knockout stage
2	Sweden (H)	3	2	0	1	5	3	+2	6	Advance to knockout stage
3	Japan	3	1	0	2	2	4	−2	3	Advance to knockout stage
4	Brazil	3	1	0	2	3	8	−5	3	

Source: FIFA
Rules for classification: Group stage tiebreakers
(H) Hosts

== Matches ==
All times listed are local, CEST (UTC+2).

=== Germany vs Japan ===
5 June 1995
14:00

Germany	1–0	Japan
Neid 23'	Report

Tingvalla IP, Karlstad
Attendance: 3,824
Referee: Petros Mathabela (South Africa)

GK	1	Manuela Goller
DF	2	Anouschka Bernhard
DF	3	Birgitt Austermühl
DF	4	Dagmar Pohlmann
MF	5	Ursula Lohn
MF	6	Maren Meinert
MF	7	Martina Voss	(substituted off) 65'
MF	8	Bettina Wiegmann
MF	10	Silvia Neid
FW	9	Heidi Mohr
FW	11	Patricia Brocker	(substituted off) 82'
Substitutions:
FW	16	Birgit Prinz	(substituted in) 65'
FW	13	Melanie Hoffmann	(substituted in) 82'
Manager:
Gero Bisanz

GK	1	Junko Ozawa
DF	2	Yumi Tomei
DF	3	Rie Yamaki
DF	4	Maki Haneta
DF	6	Kae Nishina
DF	12	Yumi Obe
MF	7	Homare Sawa
MF	8	Asako Takakura
MF	9	Futaba Kioka	(substituted off) 80'
FW	10	Akemi Noda
FW	17	Tamaki Uchiyama	(substituted off) 73'
Substitutions:
MF	13	Kaori Nagamine	(substituted in) 73'
MF	11	Etsuko Handa	(substituted in) 80'
Manager:
Tamotsu Suzuki

=== Sweden vs Brazil ===
5 June 1995
18:00

Sweden	0–1	Brazil
	Report	Roseli 37'

Olympia, Helsingborg
Attendance: 14,500
Referee: Sonia Denoncourt (Canada)

GK	1	Elisabeth Leidinge	(yellow card) 75'
DF	2	Malin Lundgren		(substituted off) 43'
DF	3	Åsa Jakobsson		(substituted off) 83'
DF	4	Pia Sundhage
DF	5	Kristin Bengtsson
MF	7	Lena Videkull
MF	9	Malin Andersson
MF	15	Anneli Olsson		(substituted off) 61'
MF	16	Eva Zeikfalvy
FW	10	Anneli Andelén
FW	11	Ulrika Kalte
Substitutions:
MF	6	Anna Pohjanen		(substituted in) 43'
MF	8	Susanne Hedberg		(substituted in) 61'
MF	20	Sofia Johansson		(substituted in) 83'
Manager:
Bengt Simonsson

GK	1	Meg
DF	3	Elane
DF	19	Suzy
MF	2	Valeria
MF	5	Leda Maria		(substituted off) 16'
MF	6	Fanta
MF	8	Cenira
MF	10	Sissi
FW	7	Pretinha	(yellow card) 21'
FW	9	Michael Jackson	(yellow card) 57'
FW	11	Roseli
Substitutions:
DF	4	Solange		(substituted in) 16'	(substituted off) 83'
FW	20	Tânia			(substituted in) 83'
Manager:
Ademar Fonseca

=== Sweden vs Germany ===
7 June 1995
19:00

Sweden	3–2	Germany
Andersson 65' (pen.), 86'; Sundhage 80'	Report	Wiegmann 9' (pen.); Lohn 42'

Olympia, Helsingborg
Attendance: 5,855
Referee: Linda May Black (New Zealand)

GK	1	Elisabeth Leidinge
DF	3	Åsa Jakobsson
DF	4	Pia Sundhage
DF	5	Kristin Bengtsson	(substituted off) 35'
MF	6	Anna Pohjanen	(substituted off) 51'
MF	7	Lena Videkull
MF	9	Malin Andersson
MF	16	Eva Zeikfalvy	(substituted off) 84'
FW	10	Anneli Andelén
FW	11	Ulrika Kalte
FW	18	Helen Nilsson
Substitutions:
MF	14	Åsa Lönnqvist	(substituted in) 35'
MF	17	Malin Flink	(substituted in) 51'
MF	15	Anneli Olsson	(substituted in) 84'
Manager:
Bengt Simonsson

GK	1	Manuela Goller
DF	2	Anouschka Bernhard
DF	3	Birgitt Austermühl	(yellow card) 61'
DF	4	Dagmar Pohlmann
MF	5	Ursula Lohn
MF	6	Maren Meinert
MF	7	Martina Voss		(substituted off) 84'
MF	8	Bettina Wiegmann
MF	10	Silvia Neid	(yellow card) 14'
FW	9	Heidi Mohr
FW	11	Patricia Brocker		(substituted off) 57'
Substitutions:
FW	16	Birgit Prinz		(substituted in) 57'
DF	14	Sandra Minnert		(substituted in) 84'
Manager:
Gero Bisanz

=== Brazil vs Japan ===
7 June 1995
19:00

Brazil	1–2	Japan
Pretinha 7'	Report	Noda 13', 45'

Tingvalla IP, Karlstad
Attendance: 2,286
Referee: Catherine Leann Hepburn (United States)

GK	1	Meg
DF	3	Elane	(yellow card) 26'
DF	4	Solange		(substituted off) 72'
DF	19	Suzy
MF	2	Valeria
MF	6	Fanta
MF	8	Cenira
MF	10	Sissi
FW	7	Pretinha
FW	9	Michael Jackson	(yellow card) 10'	(substituted off) 83'
FW	11	Roseli
Substitutions:
MF	16	Formiga		(substituted in) 72'
FW	15	Nalvinha		(substituted in) 83'
Manager:
Ademar Fonseca

GK	1	Junko Ozawa
DF	3	Rie Yamaki
DF	4	Maki Haneta
DF	6	Kae Nishina
DF	12	Yumi Obe	(yellow card) 48'
MF	7	Homare Sawa
MF	8	Asako Takakura
MF	9	Futaba Kioka
MF	16	Nami Otake
FW	10	Akemi Noda
FW	17	Tamaki Uchiyama
Manager:
Tamotsu Suzuki

=== Sweden vs Japan ===
9 June 1995
19:00

Sweden	2–0	Japan
Videkull 66'; Andelén 88'	Report

Arosvallen, Västerås
Attendance: 7,811
Referee: Petros Mathabela (South Africa)

GK	1	Elisabeth Leidinge
DF	3	Åsa Jakobsson	(substituted off) 46'
DF	4	Pia Sundhage
DF	5	Kristin Bengtsson
MF	6	Anna Pohjanen	(substituted off) 90'
MF	7	Lena Videkull
MF	9	Malin Andersson
MF	16	Eva Zeikfalvy	(substituted off) 58'
FW	10	Anneli Andelén
FW	11	Ulrika Kalte
FW	18	Helen Nilsson
Substitutions:
MF	15	Anneli Olsson	(substituted in) 46'
MF	14	Åsa Lönnqvist	(substituted in) 58'
MF	17	Malin Flink	(substituted in) 90'
Manager:
Bengt Simonsson

GK	1	Junko Ozawa
DF	3	Rie Yamaki	(yellow card) 15'
DF	4	Maki Haneta
DF	6	Kae Nishina
DF	12	Yumi Obe
MF	7	Homare Sawa		(substituted off) 76'
MF	8	Asako Takakura
MF	9	Futaba Kioka
MF	16	Nami Otake		(substituted off) 46'
FW	10	Akemi Noda
FW	17	Tamaki Uchiyama
Substitutions:
MF	13	Kaori Nagamine		(substituted in) 46'
MF	11	Etsuko Handa		(substituted in) 76'
Manager:
Tamotsu Suzuki

=== Brazil vs Germany ===
9 June 1995
19:00

Brazil	1–6	Germany
Roseli 19'	Report	Prinz 5'; Meinert 22'; Wiegmann 42' (pen.); Mohr 78', 89'; Bernhard 90'

Tingvalla IP, Karlstad
Attendance: 3,203
Referee: Alain Hamer (Luxembourg)

GK	1	Meg
DF	3	Elane
DF	4	Solange	(yellow card) 30'
DF	19	Suzy	(yellow card) 7' (yellow-red card) 63'
MF	2	Valeria		(substituted off) 80'
MF	5	Leda Maria	(yellow card) 62'	(substituted off) 90'
MF	6	Fanta
MF	8	Cenira	(yellow card) 25'
MF	10	Sissi
FW	7	Pretinha		(substituted off) 66'
FW	11	Roseli
Substitutions:
FW	20	Tânia		(substituted in) 66'
MF	16	Formiga		(substituted in) 80'
MF	14	Márcia Taffarel		(substituted in) 90'
Manager:
Ademar Fonseca

GK	1	Manuela Goller
DF	2	Anouschka Bernhard
DF	3	Birgitt Austermühl	(yellow card) 35'	(substituted off) 46'
DF	4	Dagmar Pohlmann
MF	5	Ursula Lohn
MF	6	Maren Meinert		(substituted off) 74'
MF	7	Martina Voss
MF	8	Bettina Wiegmann		(substituted off) 83'
MF	10	Silvia Neid
FW	9	Heidi Mohr
FW	16	Birgit Prinz	(yellow card) 59'
Substitutions:
DF	17	Tina Wunderlich	(yellow card) 65'	(substituted in) 46'
FW	11	Patricia Brocker		(substituted in) 74'
MF	18	Pia Wunderlich		(substituted in) 83'
Manager:
Gero Bisanz

== See also ==
- Brazil at the FIFA Women's World Cup
- Germany at the FIFA Women's World Cup
- Japan at the FIFA Women's World Cup
- Sweden at the FIFA Women's World Cup
