= UEFA Women's Euro 1995 squads =

This article lists all the confirmed national football squads for the UEFA Women's Euro 1995.

Players marked (c) were named as captain for their national squad.

== England ==
Head coach: (England) Ted Copeland

No.	Pos.	Player	Date of birth (age)	Caps	Goals	Club
	GK	Pauline Cope	16 February 1969 (aged 25)			(England) Arsenal Ladies
	GK	Lesley Higgs	25 October 1965 (aged 29)			(England) Wembley Ladies
	DF	Samantha Britton	8 December 1973 (aged 21)			(England) Arsenal Ladies
	DF	Tina Mapes	21 January 1971 (aged 23)			(England) Croydon Women
	MF	Kirsty Pealling	14 April 1975 (aged 19)			(England) Arsenal Ladies
	DF	Donna Smith	17 January 1967 (aged 27)			(England) Croydon Women
	DF	Clare Taylor	22 May 1965 (aged 29)			(England) Liverpool Ladies
	DF	Louise Waller	30 July 1969 (aged 25)			(England) Millwall Lionesses
	MF	Debbie Bampton	7 October 1961 (aged 33)			(England) Croydon Women
	MF	Karen Burke	14 June 1971 (aged 23)			(England) Liverpool Ladies
	MF	Gillian Coultard (c)	22 July 1963 (aged 31)			(England) Doncaster Belles
	MF	Kerry Davis	8 February 1962 (aged 32)			(England) Croydon Women
	MF	Janice Murray	26 October 1966 (aged 28)			(England) Liverpool Ladies
	MF	Marie Anne Spacey	13 February 1966 (aged 28)			(England) Arsenal Ladies
	MF	Sian Williams	2 February 1968 (aged 26)			(England) Arsenal Ladies
	FW	Karen Farley	2 September 1970 (aged 24)			(Sweden) Hammarby IF
	FW	Karen Walker	29 July 1969 (aged 25)			(England) Doncaster Belles

== Germany ==
Head coach: (Germany) Gero Bisanz

No.	Pos.	Player	Date of birth (age)	Caps	Goals	Club
	GK	Manuela Goller	1 April 1964 (aged 30)			(Germany) Grün-Weiß Brauweiler
	GK	Elke Walther	23 November 1970 (aged 24)			(Germany) FSV Frankfurt
	DF	Birgitt Austermühl	8 October 1965 (aged 29)			(Germany) FSV Frankfurt
	DF	Anouschka Bernhard	5 October 1970 (aged 24)			(Germany) FSV Frankfurt
	DF	Sandra Minnert	7 April 1973 (aged 21)			(Germany) FSV Frankfurt
	DF	Jutta Nardenbach	13 August 1968 (aged 26)			(Germany) TuS Ahrbach
	DF	Dagmar Pohlmann	7 February 1972 (aged 22)			(Germany) FSV Frankfurt
	MF	Doris Fitschen	25 October 1968 (aged 26)			(Germany) Sportfreunde Siegen
	MF	Ursula Lohn	7 November 1966 (aged 28)			(Germany) TuS Ahrbach
	MF	Martina Voss	22 December 1967 (aged 26)			(Germany) FC Rumeln-Kaldenhausen
	MF	Bettina Wiegmann	7 October 1971 (aged 23)			(Germany) Sportfreunde Siegen
	MF	Pia Wunderlich	26 January 1975 (aged 19)			(Germany) SG Praunheim
	FW	Katja Bornschein	16 March 1972 (aged 22)			(Germany) FSV Frankfurt
	FW	Patricia Brocker	7 April 1966 (aged 28)			(Germany) TuS Niederkirchen
	FW	Maren Meinert	5 August 1973 (aged 21)			(Germany) FC Rumeln-Kaldenhausen
	FW	Heidi Mohr	29 May 1967 (aged 27)			(Germany) TuS Ahrbach
	FW	Silvia Neid (c)	2 May 1964 (aged 30)			(Germany) TSV Siegen
	FW	Birgit Prinz	25 October 1977 (aged 17)			(Germany) FSV Frankfurt

== Norway ==
Head coach: (Norway) Even Pellerud

No.	Pos.	Player	Date of birth (age)	Caps	Goals	Club
	GK	Reidun Seth	9 June 1966 (aged 28)			(Sweden) Öxabäck IF
	DF	Merete Myklebust	16 May 1973 (aged 21)			(Norway) Trondheims-Ørn
	DF	Nina Nymark Andersen	28 September 1972 (aged 22)			(Norway) Sandviken
	DF	Heidi Støre (c)	4 July 1963 (aged 31)			(Norway) Kolbotn IL
	DF	Anita Waage	31 July 1971 (aged 23)			(Norway) Trondheims-Ørn
	DF	Agnete Carlsen	15 January 1971 (aged 23)			(Norway) Kolbotn
	DF	Gro Espeseth	30 October 1972 (aged 22)			(Norway) Sandviken
	MF	Anne Nymark Andersen	28 September 1972 (aged 22)			(Norway) Sandviken
	MF	Monica Enlid	24 April 1973 (aged 21)			(Norway) Trondheims-Ørn
	MF	Hege Riise	18 July 1969 (aged 25)			(Norway) Setskog/Høland FK
	FW	Ann Kristin Aarønes	19 January 1973 (aged 21)			(Norway) Trondheims-Ørn
	FW	Birthe Hegstad	23 July 1966 (aged 28)			(Norway) Sprint-Jeløy
	FW	Randi Leinan	9 April 1968 (aged 26)			(Norway) Trondheims-Ørn
	FW	Linda Medalen	17 June 1965 (aged 29)			(Japan) Nikko Sec. Ladies FC
	FW	Marianne Pettersen	4 December 1975 (aged 19)			(Norway) Gjelleråsen
	FW	Kristin Sandberg	23 March 1972 (aged 22)			(Norway) Asker

== Sweden ==
Head coach: (Sweden) Bengt Simonsson

No.	Pos.	Player	Date of birth (age)	Caps	Goals	Club
1	GK	Elisabeth Leidinge	6 March 1957 (aged 37)	100	0	(Sweden) Malmö FF
2	DF	Annika Nessvold	24 February 1971 (aged 23)	11	2	(Sweden) Malmö FF
3	DF	Åsa Jakobsson	2 June 1966 (aged 28)	28	0	(Sweden) Gideonsbergs IF
4	FW	Pia Sundhage (c)	13 February 1960 (aged 34)	113	61	(Sweden) Hammarby IF
5	DF	Kristin Bengtsson	12 January 1970 (aged 24)	19	1	(Sweden) Hammarby IF
6	MF	Anneli Olsson	7 February 1967 (aged 27)	2	1	(Sweden) Hammarby IF
7	MF	Malin Andersson	4 May 1973 (aged 21)	7	2	(Sweden) Älvsjö AIK
8	MF	Eva Zeikfalvy	18 April 1967 (aged 27)	50	1	(Sweden) Malmö FF
9	FW	Ulrika Kalte	19 May 1970 (aged 24)	25	9	(Sweden) Älvsjö AIK
10	FW	Anneli Andelén	21 June 1968 (aged 26)	69	30	(Sweden) Öxabäck/Mark IF
11	FW	Helen Johansson	9 July 1965 (aged 29)	80	21	(Sweden) Jitex BK/JG93
12	GK	Annelie Nilsson	14 June 1971 (aged 23)	11	0	(Sweden) Sunnanå SK
13	DF	Malin Lundgren	9 March 1967 (aged 27)	50	6	(Sweden) Malmö FF
14	MF	Susanne Hedberg	26 June 1972 (aged 22)	46	7	(Sweden) Gideonsbergs IF
15	MF	Anna Pohjanen	25 January 1974 (aged 20)	0	0	(Sweden) Sunnanå SK
16	FW	Helen Nilsson	24 November 1970 (aged 24)	30	6	(Sweden) Gideonsbergs IF
17	FW	Lena Videkull	9 December 1962 (aged 32)	88	54	(Sweden) Malmö FF

Sweden caps and goals based on compilation of match reports at https://www.svenskfotboll.se/landslag/dam/landskamper-1973-2000/
Source: Swedish Football Association
