= 1995 FIFA Women's World Cup final =

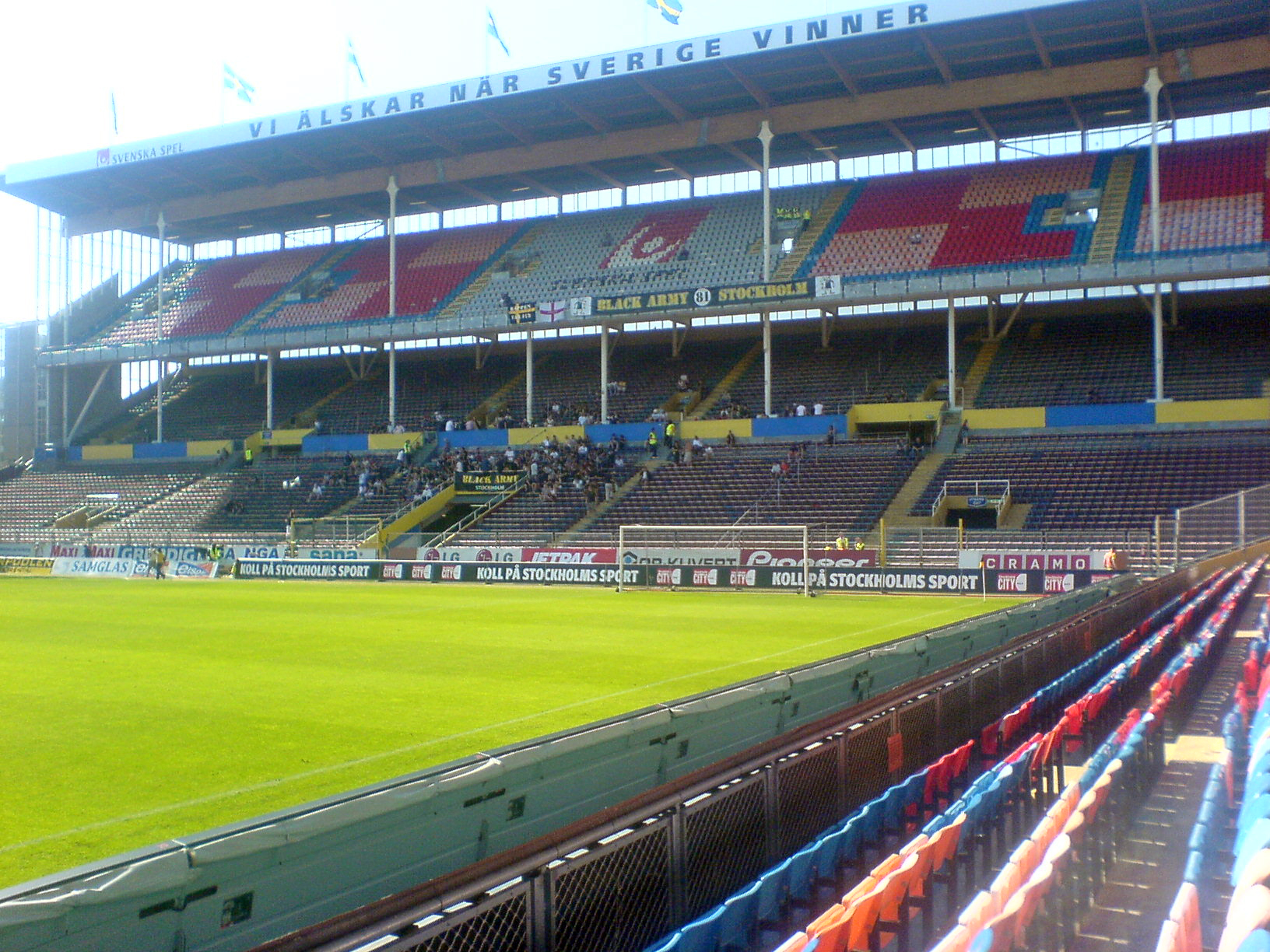
- Råsunda Stadium in Solna hosted the final.
- Event: 1995 FIFA Women's World Cup
Germany	Norway
0	2
- Date: 18 June 1995
- Venue: Råsunda Stadium, Solna
- Referee: Ingrid Jonsson (Sweden)
- Attendance: 17,158

The 1995 FIFA Women's World Cup final was a football match that took place at Råsunda Stadium in Stockholm, Sweden on 18 June 1995. It pitted Germany and Norway to determine the winner of the 1995 FIFA Women's World Cup. Norway won 2–0 with goals from Hege Riise and Marianne Pettersen.

== Background ==
The match was contested by 1991 finalists Norway, who had defeated previous winners the United States, and Germany, who had defeated China in the semi-final.

== Route to the final ==
Germany
Round
Norway
Opponent
Result
Group stage
Opponent
Result
Japan
1–0
Match 1
Nigeria
8–0
Sweden
2–3
Match 2
England
2–0
Brazil
6–1
Match 3
Canada
7–0

Pos	Team	Pld	Pts
1	Germany	3	6
2	Sweden (H)	3	6
3	Japan	3	3
4	Brazil	3	3

Source: FIFA
(H) Hosts
Final standings

Pos	Team	Pld	Pts
1	Norway	3	9
2	England	3	6
3	Canada	3	1
4	Nigeria	3	1

Source: FIFA
Opponent
Result
Knockout stage
Opponent
Result
England
3–0
Quarter-finals
Denmark
3–1
China
1–0
Semi-finals
United States
1–0

== Match ==
=== Details ===
18 June 1995
18:00 CEST

Germany	0–2	Norway
	Report	Riise 37'; Pettersen 40'

Råsunda Stadium, Solna
Attendance: 17,158
Referee: Ingrid Jonsson (Sweden)

Germany	Norway

GK	1	Manuela Goller
SW	5	Ursula Lohn
CB	3	Birgitt Austermühl
CB	2	Anouschka Bernhard	(yellow card) 2'
DM	8	Bettina Wiegmann
RM	6	Maren Meinert		(substituted off) 86'
CM	10	Silvia Neid (c)
CM	7	Martina Voss
LM	4	Dagmar Pohlmann		(substituted off) 75'
CF	9	Heidi Mohr
CF	16	Birgit Prinz		(substituted off) 42'
Substitutions:
FW	11	Patricia Brocker		(substituted in) 42'
MF	18	Pia Wunderlich		(substituted in) 75'
MF	19	Sandra Smisek		(substituted in) 86'
Manager:
Gero Bisanz

GK	1	Bente Nordby
RB	2	Tina Svensson
CB	5	Nina Nymark Andersen
CB	3	Gro Espeseth (c)
LB	13	Merete Myklebust
DM	4	Anne Nymark Andersen	(yellow card) 22'
CM	6	Hege Riise
CM	7	Tone Haugen
RW	16	Marianne Pettersen
LW	11	Ann Kristin Aarønes	(yellow card) 70'
CF	10	Linda Medalen	(yellow card) 58'
Manager:
Even Pellerud

Assistant referees:
Gitte Holm (Denmark)
Maria Rodríguez (Mexico)

Match rules:

- 90 minutes.
- 30 minutes of golden goal extra time if necessary.
- Penalty shoot-out if scores still level.
- Maximum of three substitutions.

== See also ==
- Germany at the FIFA Women's World Cup
- Norway at the FIFA Women's World Cup
