= UEFA Women's Euro 1997 qualifying =

Football tournament qualification stage

The qualification for the UEFA Women's Euro 1997 was held between 17 September 1995 and 29 September 1996. The first-placed of the group stage qualified directly. The second-placed and the third-placed teams played in two playoff matches for four other berths.

== Class A ==
=== Group 1 ===
Team	Pts	Pld	W	D	L	GF	GA
Norway	16	6	5	1	0	33	1
Germany	13	6	4	1	1	15	3
Finland	4	6	1	1	4	2	19
Slovakia	1	6	0	1	5	1	28

19 September 1995

Norway	17–0	Slovakia
Medalen 5', 44', 57'; Aarønes 16', 59', 68', 80', 88'; Pettersen 26', 33', 35', 42', 60', 67'; Sandaune 40'; Riise 84'; Haugen 85'	NFF Report (in Norwegian)

Ulefoss idrettspark, Ulefoss
Attendance: 2,300
Referee: Regina Konink-Belksma (Netherlands)

20 September 1995

Finland	0–3	Germany
	DFB Report (in German)	Wiegmann 15', 84'; Mohr 66'

Ratina Stadium, Tampere
Attendance: 1,000
Referee: Ingrid Jonsson (Sweden)

11 October 1995

Slovakia	0–0	Finland

Mestský štadión Bardejov, Slovakia
Attendance: 2,400
Referee: Granat (Poland)

25 October 1995

Slovakia	0–3	Germany
	DFB Report (in German)	Prinz 16'; Mohr 54'; Neid 79'

Štadión Pasienky, Bratislava

11 April 1996

Germany	2–0	Slovakia
Wiegmann 69'; Fitschen 87'	DFB Report (in German)

Sportpark Unterhaching, Unterhaching

2 May 1996

Germany	1–3	Norway
Brocker 9'	NFF Report (in Norwegian); DFB Report (in German)	Haugen 15', 31'; Medalen 51'

Ernst Abbe Sportfield, Jena
Attendance: 1,500
Referee: Alain Hamer (Luxembourg)

5 May 1996

Germany	6–0	Finland
Smisek 10'; Mohr 30', 44'; P. Wunderlich 45'; Minnert 56'; Austermühl 68'	DFB Report (in German)

GWG-Stadion, Gifhorn
Attendance: 3,700
Referee: Tiziana Calamosca (Italy)

25 May 1996

Finland	0–2	Norway
	NFF Report (in Norwegian)	Riise 6'; Pettersen 55'

Leppävaaran Stadion, Espoo
Attendance: 250
Referee: Gitte Lyngø Nielsen (Denmark)

6 June 1996

Norway	0–0	Germany
	NFF Report (in Norwegian); DFB Report (in German)

Lerkendal Stadion, Trondheim
Attendance: 2,779
Referee: Hermann van Dijk

6 July 1996

Norway	7–0	Finland
Sandaune 10'; Medalen 38', 81', 85'; Riise 62'; Pettersen 69'; Haugen 71'	NFF Report (in Norwegian)

Sofiemyr Stadion, Kolbotn
Attendance: 1,415
Referee: R.J. Ellingham (Wales)

14 August 1996

Finland	2–1	Slovakia
Heikari 23'; Sarlin 65'	/ SFZ Report (in Slovak)	Kúdelová 64'

Kauniainen Finland
Attendance: 623
Referee: Jüri Saar (Estonia)

31 August 1996

Slovakia	0–4	Norway
	NFF Report (in Norwegian)	A. Nymark Andersen 24'; Knudsen 25'; Pettersen 48'; Jørgensen 73'

Levice Stadion, Levice
Attendance: 1,270
Referee: Milan Mitrovic

Norway qualified for the final tournament.

Germany and Finland advanced for the playoff A.

Slovakia advanced for the playoff A-B.

=== Group 2 ===
Team	Pts	Pld	W	D	L	GF	GA
Russia	11	6	3	2	1	10	3
France	9	6	2	3	1	9	6
Iceland	7	6	2	1	3	8	14
Netherlands	5	6	1	2	3	4	8

17 September 1995
16:00

Iceland	1–4	Russia
Ólafsdóttir 44'	KSÍ Report (in Icelandic); RFS Report (in Russian)	Khalimdarova 3'; Barbashina 27'; Svetlitskaya 60'; Bosikova 77'

Laugardalsvöllur, Reykjavík
Attendance: 127

30 September 1995
16:00

Iceland	3–3	France
Víglundsdóttir 6'; Ólafsdóttir 20'; Helgadóttir 41'	Report (in French); KSÍ Report (in Icelandic)	Pichon 28', 84'; Óttarsdóttir 90' (o.g.)

Akranesvöllur, Akranes
Attendance: 200
Referee: Gitte Lyngo Nielsen (Denmark)

7 October 1995

Iceland	2–0	Netherlands
Helgadóttir 51'; Ólafsdóttir 85'	KNVB Report (in Dutch); KSÍ Report (in Icelandic)

Laugardalsvöllur, Reykjavík
Attendance: 200

14 October 1995
15:00

Russia	0–0	France
	Report (in French); RFS Report (in Russian)

Tsentralnyi Profsoyuz Stadion, Voronezh
Attendance: 5,500
Referee: Romans Lajuks (Latvia)

4 November 1995
12:00

Netherlands	1–1	Russia
van Waarden 87'	KNVB Report (in Dutch); RFS Report (in Russian)	Bosikova 47'

Sportpark De Koog, Koog aan de Zaan
Attendance: 1,200
Referee: Tiziana Calamosca (Italy)

9 December 1995
15:00

France	1–1	Netherlands
Pichon 44'	Report (in French); KNVB Report (in Dutch)	Migchelsen 75'

Stade de la Mosson, Montpellier
Attendance: 2,500
Referee: Bente Ovedie Skogvang (Norway)

6 April 1996
15:00

Netherlands	1–2	France
Korbmacher 7'	Report (in French); KNVB Report (in Dutch)	Gout 4'; Henriques 82'

De Roodemolen, Sassenheim
Attendance: 1,200
Referee: Katriina Elovirta (Finland)

18 May 1996
17:00

Russia	0–1	Netherlands
	KNVB Report (in Dutch); RFS Report (in Russian)	Korbmacher 49'

Stroitel Stadium, Selyatino
Attendance: 1,500
Referee: A. Radescu (Romania)

25 May 1996
20:00

France	0–1	Russia
	Report (in French); RFS Report (in Russian)	Grigorieva 34'

Stade Georges Pompidou, Valence
Attendance: 4,200
Referee: Ingrid Jonsson (Sweden)

1 June 1996
18:00

France	3–0	Iceland
Pichon 26', 59'; Sykora 54'	Report (in French); KSÍ Report (in Icelandic)

Stade Jean Bouin, Angers
Attendance: 3,000
Referee: Luc Huyghe (Belgium)

5 June 1996

Netherlands	0–2	Iceland
	KNVB Report (in Dutch); KSÍ Report (in Icelandic)	Jónsdóttir 9'; Helgadóttir 85'

Sportpark De Rohorst, Den Ham
Attendance: 1,500
Referee: Christine Frai (Germany)

17 August 1996
20:00

Russia	4–0	Iceland
Egorova 2', 70'; Svetlitskaya 72'; Bosikova 84'	KSÍ Report (in Icelandic); RFS Report (in Russian)

Lokomotiv Stadium, Moscow
Attendance: 200

Russia qualified for the final tournament.

France and Iceland advanced for the playoff A.

Netherlands advanced for the playoff A-B.

=== Group 3 ===
Team	Pts	Pld	W	D	L	GF	GA
Italy	14	6	4	2	0	16	3
England	13	6	4	1	1	17	3
Portugal	6	6	2	0	4	4	14
Croatia	1	6	0	1	5	0	17

21 October 1995
14:30

Italy	7–0	Croatia
Tesse 1'; Fiorini 22'; Morace 28', 46', 90'; Guarino 50', 78'	HNS Report; FIGC Report (in Italian)

Stadio Marc'Antonio Bentegodi, Verona
Referee: Drmandyev (Bulgaria)

1 November 1995

England	1–1	Italy
Coultard 33'	FIGC Report (in Italian)	Morace 44'

Roker Park, Sunderland
Referee: Christine Frai (Germany)

4 November 1995
14:00

Croatia	0–2	Portugal
	FPF Report (in Portuguese); HNS Report	Cazuza 72'; Paula Cristina 82'

Gradski Stadion, Zagreb
Referee: Florence Guyot (France)

19 November 1995
14:00

England	5–0	Croatia
	HNS Report

The Valley, London

9 December 1995
15:30

Portugal	0–2	Italy
	FPF Report (in Portuguese); FIGC Report (in Italian)	Morace 11'; Carta 37'

Estádio Sanches de Miranda, Évora
Referee: Juan Manuel Brito Arceo (Spain)

11 February 1996
15:30

Portugal	0–5	England
	FPF Report (in Portuguese)	Powell 25'; Farley 33'; Coultard 48'; Camerail 76'; Burke 89'

Campo de Jogos Portas do Sol, Benavente
Referee: Regina Belksma-Konink (Netherlands)

16 March 1996

Italy	2–1	England
Carta 50'; Morace 59'	FIGC Report (in Italian)	Smith 43'

Stadio San Vito, Cosenza
Referee: Florence Guyot (France)

7 April 1996
16:00

Italy	4–1	Portugal
Panico 5'; Tavalazzi 22'; Ciardi 50'; Fiorini 82'	FPF Report (in Portuguese); FIGC Report (in Italian)	Paula Freitas 57'

Stadio Francesco Baracca, Mestre
Referee: Christine Frai (Germany)

18 April 1996
17:00

Croatia	0–2	England
	HNS Report

Stadion Gradski vrt, Osijek
Attendance: 1,617

11 May 1996
15:45

Croatia	0–0	Italy
	HNS Report; FIGC Report (in Italian)

Veli Jože, Poreč
Referee: Nicole Petignat (Switzerland)

19 May 1996
11:00

England	3–0	Portugal
Davis 9', 54'; Smith 38'	FPF Report (in Portuguese)

Griffin Park, Brentford
Referee: Bente Ovedie Skogvang (Norway)

25 May 1996
18:00

Portugal	1–0	Croatia
Alfredina 89'	FPF Report (in Portuguese); HNS Report

Estádio Municipal de Coimbra, Coimbra
Referee: Victor José Esquinas Torres (Spain)

Italy qualified for the final tournament.

England and Portugal advanced for the playoff A.

Croatia advanced for the playoff A-B.

=== Group 4 ===
Team	Pts	Pld	W	D	L	GF	GA
Sweden	16	6	5	1	0	26	2
Denmark	12	6	4	0	2	14	5
Spain	5	6	1	2	3	8	15
Romania	1	6	0	1	5	4	30

30 September 1995
15:00

Denmark	1–2	Sweden
L. Madsen 69'	DBU Report (in Danish); SvFF report (in Swedish)	Wahlgren 42'; Sundhage 86'

Hjørring Stadion, Hjørring
Attendance: 660
Referee: Bente Skogvang (Norway)

10 October 1995
19:00

Denmark	8–0	Romania
L. Madsen 1', 85'; B. Christensen 4', 22', 74'; Flæng 16'; Krogh 65', 79'	DBU Report (in Danish)

Hjørring Stadion, Hjørring
Attendance: 520
Referee: Bernard Saules (France)

15 October 1995
14:00

Sweden	8–0	Romania
Lönnqvist; Lovén; Pohjanen; Wahlgren; Kalte	SvFF Report (in Swedish)

Domnarvsvallen, Borlänge
Attendance: 2,637

19 November 1995
12:00

Spain	0–1	Denmark
	DBU Report (in Danish)	L. Madsen 53'

Estadio Municipal Pozoblanco, Pozoblanco
Attendance: 3,600
Referee: Regina Belksma-Konink (Netherlands)

31 March 1996

Spain	5–1	Romania

Castelló de la Plana

21 April 1996
13:00

Denmark	2–0	Spain
L. Madsen 47'; Brink 52'	DBU Report (in Danish)

Hjørring Stadion, Hjørring
Attendance: 710
Referee: Michael Ross (Netherlands)

1 May 1996

Romania	2–2	Spain

Câmpina

11 May 1996

Romania	1–2	Denmark
Enache 32'	DBU Report (in Danish)	L. Madsen 6'; Petersen 50'

Stadionul Poiana, Câmpina
Attendance: 2,500
Referee: Josef Krula (Czech Republic)

12 May 1996
13:30

Sweden	1–1	Spain
Sundhage	SvFF Report (in Swedish)	Prieto

Gutavallen, Visby
Attendance: 1,584

2 June 1996

Spain	0–8	Sweden
	SvFF Report (in Swedish)	Ljungberg; Pohjanen; Swedberg; Å. Jakobsson; Videkull; Sundhage

Estadio Guillermo Olagüe, Gandia
Attendance: 319

26 June 1996

Romania	0–5	Sweden
	SvFF Report (in Swedish)	Swedberg; Wahlgren; Nessvold; Videkull

Stadionul Poiana, Câmpina
Attendance: 346

31 August 1996
15:00

Sweden	2–0	Denmark
M. Andersson; Videkull	DBU Report (in Danish); SvFF Report (in Swedish)

Arosvallen, Västerås
Attendance: 1,606
Referee: Guðmundur Maríasson (Iceland)

Sweden qualified for the final tournament.

Denmark and Spain advanced for the playoff A.

Romania advanced for the playoff A-B.

== Class B ==
=== Group 5 ===
Team	Pts	Pld	W	D	L	GF	GA
Belgium	22	8	7	1	0	28	2
Republic of Ireland	18	8	6	0	2	20	10
Scotland	9	8	3	0	5	17	23
Wales	7	8	2	1	5	9	15
Faroe Islands	3	8	1	0	7	3	27

24 September 1995
15:00

Faroe Islands	0–2	Republic of Ireland
	FAI Report	McNally 39'; O'Toole 84'

Svangaskarð, Toftir
Referee: Andreas Schluchter (Switzerland)

8 October 1995
15:00

Wales	0–3	Republic of Ireland
	FAI Report	O'Shea 12'; Gallagher 61'; Boyle 86'

Stebonheath Park, Llanelli
Referee: Gudmundur Stefán Maríasson (Iceland)

11 October 1995
20:00

Belgium	2–0	Faroe Islands
Vautmans 21'; Migom 27'	KBVB Report (in Dutch)

Koning Boudewijnstadion, Brussels
Referee: Vencel Tóth (Hungary)

23 October 1995

Scotland	7–1	Faroe Islands
Hamill 26' 72'; Gunn 27' 47'; McWhinnie 38'; Brown 64'; Grant 85'		S. Joensen 39'

Dumfries

25 October 1995

Wales	0–1	Faroe Islands
		Ellingsgaard 35'

Bangor

28 October 1995
19:00

Republic of Ireland	3–1	Faroe Islands
McNally 26', 42'; Gallagher 89'	FAI Report	Rein 39'

Dalymount Park, Dublin
Referee: Jørn West Larsen (Denmark)

5 November 1995
15:00

Republic of Ireland	2–0	Scotland
O'Shea 54', 83'	FAI Report

Dalymount Park, Dublin
Referee: Katriina Elovirta (Finland)

18 November 1995
15:00

Belgium	2–0	Wales
Vanslembrouck 22', 41'	KBVB Report (in Dutch)

Koning Boudewijnstadion, Brussels
Referee: Renatus Temmink (Netherlands)

26 November 1995
14:00

Scotland	0–3	Belgium
	KBVB Report (in Dutch)	Saelens 9', 21'; Migom 64'

St Mirren Park, Paisley
Referee: John Ferry (Northern Ireland)

25 February 1996
15:00

Republic of Ireland	5–1	Wales
O'Toole 6', 29'; Boyle 41'; O'Shea 44'; Lyons 57'	FAI Report	Merola 70'

Dalymount Park, Dublin
Referee: Ingrid Jonsson (Sweden)

24 March 1996

Wales	5–1	Scotland

Wales

31 March 1996
15:00

Republic of Ireland	0–1	Belgium
	FAI Report; KBVB Report (in Dutch)	Saelens 89'

Dalymount Park, Dublin
Referee: Bente Ovedie Skogvang (Norway)

7 April 1996
14:00

Scotland	2–4	Republic of Ireland
MacDonald 81'; Finnie-henderson 83'	FAI Report	O'Shea 21'; O'Toole 33', 47', 53'

Forthbank Stadium, Stirling
Referee: Bente Folsing (Denmark)

13 April 1996
14:00

Wales	0–0	Belgium
	KBVB Report (in Dutch)

Jenner Park Stadium, Barry
Referee: Charles Schaak (Luxembourg)

20 April 1996
16:00

Belgium	6–1	Scotland
Maes 1'; Migom 9', 49'; Van Herle 39', 82'; Saelens 75'	KBVB Report (in Dutch)	Hutton 50'

Stade communal, Namur
Referee: Ingrid Jonsson (Sweden)

4 May 1996
15:00

Belgium	5–1	Republic of Ireland
Migom 50'; Maes 67'; Van Herle 82'; Vanslembrouck 87'; Maus 90'	FAI Report; KBVB Report (in Dutch)	O'Neill 66'

Regenboogstadion, Waregem
Referee: Florence Dorigny (France)

18 May 1996
15:00

Faroe Islands	0–9	Belgium
	KBVB Report (in Dutch)	Vanslembrouck 25', 61', 68', 86'; Migom 42'; Saelens 66', 78'; Maes 75'; Maus 90'

Svangaskarð, Toftir
Referee: Vibeke Karlsen (Norway)

25 May 1996

Faroe Islands	0–3	Scotland

Svangaskarð, Toftir

2 June 1996

Scotland	3–2	Wales

Scotland

8 June 1996

Faroe Islands	0–1	Wales
		Jones 31'

Svangaskarð, Toftir

Belgium advanced for the playoff A-B.

=== Group 6 ===
Team	Pts	Pld	W	D	L	GF	GA
Czech Republic	18	6	6	0	0	31	4
Poland	9	6	3	0	3	22	9
Belarus	9	6	3	0	3	12	9
Estonia	0	6	0	0	6	0	43

12 September 1995
16:00

Poland	9–0	Estonia
	EJL Report (in Estonian)

OSiR Stadium, Gorlice
Attendance: 1,100
Referee: Ihor Yarmenchuk (Ukraine)

17 September 1995
16:00

Czech Republic	11–0	Estonia
Chlumecká 7', 11', 29', 43', 63', 72'; Jedličková 19', 41'; Valková 33'; Dudová 58'; Třísková 81'	FAČR Report (in Czech); EJL Report (in Estonian)

Na Litavce, Příbram
Attendance: 570
Referee: Alain Hamer (Luxembourg)

7 October 1995

Belarus	0–1	Czech Republic
	FAČR Report (in Czech)	Chlumecká 33'

Spartak Stadium, Mogilev
Attendance: 500
Referee: Katriina Elovirta (Finland)

14 October 1995
15:00

Estonia	0–8	Poland
	EJL Report (in Estonian)

Maarjamäe Stadium, Tallinn
Attendance: 30
Referee: Bogdan Benedik (Slovakia)

4 November 1995

Poland	3–0	Belarus

Poland

18 May 1996

Belarus	2–0	Poland

Dinamo Stadium, Brest

25 May 1996

Estonia	0–7	Czech Republic
	FAČR Report (in Czech); EJL Report (in Estonian)	Chlumecká 14', 41', 49'; Kohoutová 26'; Zuzaníková 56'; Fedorková 69'; Mázlová 74'

Maarjamäe Stadium, Tallinn
Attendance: 80
Referee: Knud Stadsgaard (Denmark)

1 June 1996

Estonia	0–4	Belarus
	EJL Report (in Estonian)	Belkevich 11'; Volkova 27'; Kozeyeva 33'; Prikhodko 84'

Maarjamäe Stadium, Tallinn
Attendance: 50
Referee: Sergejs Braga (Latvia)

8 June 1996

Poland	0–1	Czech Republic
	FAČR Report (in Czech)	Fedorková 28' (pen.)

Stadion Miejski Kuźniczka, Kędzierzyn-Koźle

29 June 1996

Czech Republic	5–2	Belarus
Dudová 11', 26', 48', 57'; Zuzaníková 76'	FAČR Report (in Czech)	Ryzhevich 38'; Shevtsova 86'

Mestský Stadion, Čelákovice
Attendance: 650
Referee: Valeriy Onufer (Ukraine)

14 July 1996

Belarus	4–0	Estonia
Luchonak 11'; Volkova 21'; Shevtsova 35'; Gorevaya 77'	EJL Report (in Estonian)

Spartak Stadium, Bobruisk
Attendance: 3,000
Referee: Iouri Tchebotarev (Russia)

25 August 1996

Czech Republic	6–2	Poland
Jedličková 1', 68'; Zuzaníková 5'; Chlumecká 12', 54', 59'	FAČR Report (in Czech)	Silwonczyk 49', 77'

Na Bašte, Lázně Bohdaneč
Attendance: 350
Referee: István Vad Sr. (Hungary)

Czech Republic advanced for the playoff A-B.

=== Group 7 ===
Team	Pts	Pld	W	D	L	GF	GA
Switzerland	10	6	3	1	2	15	8
FR Yugoslavia	10	6	3	1	2	13	9
Austria	10	6	3	1	2	8	12
Greece	4	6	1	1	4	3	10

17 September 1995

Austria	2–1	FR Yugoslavia

Austria

27 September 1995

FR Yugoslavia	0–5	Switzerland

Yugoslavia

15 October 1995

Switzerland	3–0	Austria

Switzerland

5 November 1995

Austria	1–0	Greece

Austria

2 December 1995

Greece	0–3	FR Yugoslavia

Greece

2 March 1996

Greece	2–0	Switzerland

Greece

6 April 1996

Greece	0–0	Austria

Greece

4 May 1996

Switzerland	3–1	Greece

Switzerland

19 May 1996

Austria	4–3	Switzerland

Austria

1 June 1996

FR Yugoslavia	3–0	Greece

Yugoslavia

8 June 1996

FR Yugoslavia	5–1	Austria

Yugoslavia

16 June 1996

Switzerland	1–1	FR Yugoslavia

Switzerland

Switzerland advanced for the playoff A-B.

=== Group 8 ===
Team	Pts	Pld	W	D	L	GF	GA
Ukraine	16	6	5	1	0	12	2
Bulgaria	12	6	4	0	2	13	6
Hungary	7	6	2	1	3	12	9
Turkey	0	6	0	0	6	1	21
Azerbaijan	0	0	0	0	0	0	0

16 September 1995

Bulgaria	0–1	Ukraine

Bulgaria

4 October 1995
14:00

Hungary	6–0	Turkey
	TFF Report

Széktói Stadion, Kecskemét
Referee: Pavlin Jirku (Czech Republic)

21 October 1995
14:30

Turkey	0–4	Bulgaria
	TFF Report

Yusuf Ziya Öniş Stadium, Istanbul
Referee: Haim Lipkovitch

22 November 1995

Hungary	1–1	Ukraine

Hungary

14 April 1996
16:00

Ukraine	3–0	Turkey
	TFF Report

Shakhtar Stadium, Donetsk
Referee: Romāns Lajuks (Latvia)

14 April 1996

Bulgaria	3–2	Hungary

Bulgaria

9 May 1996
15:30

Turkey	1–2	Hungary
Bulut 73'	TFF Report	?? ??

Şenlikköy Stadium, Istanbul
Referee: Dani Koren (Israel)

19 May 1996

Ukraine	2–1	Bulgaria

Ukraine

16 June 1996

Ukraine	2–0	Hungary

Ukraine

16 June 1996

Bulgaria	3–0	Turkey
	TFF Report

Bulgaria
Referee: Serguei Anokhin (Russia)

24 August 1996
17:00

Turkey	0–3	Ukraine
	TFF Report

Zeytinburnu Stadium, Istanbul
Referee: Asim Khudiev (Azerbaijan)

25 August 1996

Hungary	1–2	Bulgaria

Hungary

Ukraine advanced for the playoff A-B.

== Playoff A ==
=== First leg ===
7 September 1996
13:00

Finland	0–2	France
	Report (in French)	Pichon 32', 68'

Hakunilan Urheilupuisto, Vantaa
Attendance: 276
Referee: Christine Frai (Germany)

7 September 1996
17:00 (UTC)

Portugal	1–7	Denmark
Sónia Silva 87'	FPF Report (in Portuguese); DBU Report (in Danish)	Petersen 9'; L. Madsen 13'; Flæng 24', 69'; Krogh 45'; Nørregaard 77'; Brink 90'

Estádio Joaquim Maria Baptista, Alcanena
Attendance: 3,000
Referee: Gertrud Gebhard-Regus (Germany)

8 September 1996

Spain	2–1	England

Montilla

18 September 1996

Iceland	0–3	Germany
	KSÍ Report (in Icelandic); DFB Report (in German)	Voss 24', 66'; Jones 86'

Laugardalsvöllur, Reykjavík
Attendance: 200
Referee: Vibeke Karlsen (Norway)

=== Second leg ===
28 September 1996
15:00

France	3–0	Finland
Roujas 25'; Diacre 31'; Woock 54'	Report (in French)

Stade René Fenouillère, Avranches
Attendance: 1,354
Referee: Galina Doneva (Bulgaria)

France won 5–0 on aggregate.

28 September 1996
14:30 (UTC+1)

Denmark	5–0	Portugal
Brink 2', 8'; Nørregaard 30'; Eggers Nielsen 64' (pen.); B. Christensen 66'	FPF Report (in Portuguese); DBU Report (in Danish)

Hjørring Stadion, Hjørring
Attendance: 307
Referee: Nicole Petignat (Switzerland)

Denmark won 12–1 on aggregate.

29 September 1996

Germany	4–0	Iceland
Mohr 14'; Hingst 46', 65'; Stegemann 62'	KSÍ Report (in Icelandic); DFB Report (in German)

Stadion Oberwerth, Koblenz
Attendance: 1,200
Referee: Florence Dorigny (France)

Germany won 7–0 on aggregate.

29 September 1996

England	1–1	Spain

England

Spain won 3–2 on aggregate.

France, Denmark, Germany and Spain qualified for the final tournament.

== Playoff A-B ==
=== First leg ===
7 September 1996
15:00

Belgium	3–1	Slovakia
Saelens 52'; Maus 82'; Roden 86'	KBVB Report (in Dutch)	Skodlerova 5'

Pierre Cornelis Stadion, Aalst
Referee: Lale Orta (Turkey)

7 September 1996
18:00

Switzerland	3–2	Croatia
	HNS Report

Stade de la Gérine, Marly

8 September 1996
16:30

Czech Republic	1–2	Netherlands
Fedorková 36'	KNVB Report (in Dutch); FAČR Report (in Czech)	Kiesel-Griffioen 40'; Wiegman 46'

Mestský Stadion, Čelákovice
Attendance: 1,060
Referee: Florence Dorigno (France)

8 September 1996

Ukraine	1–2	Romania

Ukraine

=== Second leg ===
28 September 1996
15:00

Slovakia	1–2	Belgium
Gaziova 23'	KBVB Report (in Dutch)	Maes 81'; Roden 84'

Mestský futbalový štadión, Michalovce
Referee: Eva Ödlund (Sweden)

Belgium won 5–2 on aggregate.

28 September 1996
19:30

Netherlands	1–0	Czech Republic
Timisela 13'	KNVB Report (in Dutch); FAČR Report (in Czech)

Stadion De Braak, Helmond
Attendance: 3,500
Referee: Bente Ovedie Skogvang (Norway)

Netherlands won 3–1 on aggregate.

28 September 1996
16:00

Croatia	0–3	Switzerland
	HNS Report

Gradski stadion, Kutina
Referee: Gitte Lyngo Nielsen (Denmark)

Switzerland won 6–2 on aggregate.

28 September 1996

Romania	1–4	Ukraine

Romania

Ukraine won 5–3 on aggregate.
