= 2000 WUSA foreign player allocation =

The 2000 WUSA foreign player allocation took place on October 30, 2000. It was the first international draft held by Women's United Soccer Association (WUSA) to assign the rights of international players to the eight American-based teams. The 16 players were paired and each team selected one pair.

== Round 1 ==
Pick	Player	Pos.	WUSA team	Previous team
1	(Norway) Bente Nordby	GK	Carolina Courage	Athene Moss
1	(Norway) Hege Riise	MF	Carolina Courage	Asker Fotball

== Round 2 ==
Pick	Player	Pos.	WUSA team	Previous team
2	(Germany) Doris Fitschen	DF	Philadelphia Charge	1. FFC Frankfurt
2	(England) Kelly Smith	FW	Philadelphia Charge	New Jersey Lady Stallions

== Round 3 ==
Pick	Player	Pos.	WUSA team	Previous team
3	(Brazil) Kátia	FW	Bay Area CyberRays	São Paulo
3	(Brazil) Sissi	FW	Bay Area CyberRays	Vasco da Gama

== Round 4 ==
Pick	Player	Pos.	WUSA team	Previous team
4	(Norway) Ann Kristin Aarønes	FW	New York Power	Trondheims-Ørn
4	(Norway) Gro Espeseth	DF	New York Power	Trondheims-Ørn

== Round 5 ==
Pick	Player	Pos.	WUSA team	Previous team
5	(Canada) Charmaine Hooper	FW	Atlanta Beat	Chicago Cobras
5	(Japan) Homare Sawa	MF	Atlanta Beat	Denver Diamonds

== Round 6 ==
Pick	Player	Pos.	WUSA team	Previous team
6	(Germany) Maren Meinert	FW	Boston Breakers	FFC Brauweiler Pulheim
6	(Germany) Bettina Wiegmann	MF	Boston Breakers	FFC Brauweiler Pulheim

== Round 7 ==
Pick	Player	Pos.	WUSA team	Previous team
7	(Brazil) Pretinha	FW	Washington Freedom	Vasco da Gama
7	(Brazil) Roseli	FW	Washington Freedom	Vasco da Gama

== Round 8 ==
Pick	Player	Pos.	WUSA team	Previous team
8	(Sweden) Kristin Bengtsson	DF	San Diego Spirit	Landvetter IF
8	(Sweden) Ulrika Karlsson	GK	San Diego Spirit	Bälinge IF

== Draft notes ==
Each team had already been allocated three national team players ("founders") on May 24, 2000. The teams then arranged the order for the foreign player allocation between themselves, using a voting system which took account of the previous allocation. The 16 players to be allocated included some of the top players from around the world. Eight of them, including all four Brazilians, had signed for the league the day before the draft. The players were packaged into pairs as part of an effort to help them adapt to life in America.

A 15-round main draft, which also included foreign players, followed on December 10–11, 2000. A supplemental college draft on February 4, 2001 completed the process before the inaugural season began in April 2001. In common with Major League Soccer, WUSA had a single-entity ownership structure. This meant that the league office owned the players' contracts and negotiated all agreements. Each team got an $800,000 salary cap to cover their final roster of 20 players.

Sports Illustrated soccer journalist Grant Wahl described Philadelphia's second round pick of Smith and Fitschen ahead of Sissi and Kátia as "a boneheaded move". The slur angered Smith, who later extracted an apology from Wahl.
