= Råsunda Stadium =

Association football stadium in Solna, Sweden between 1937–2012

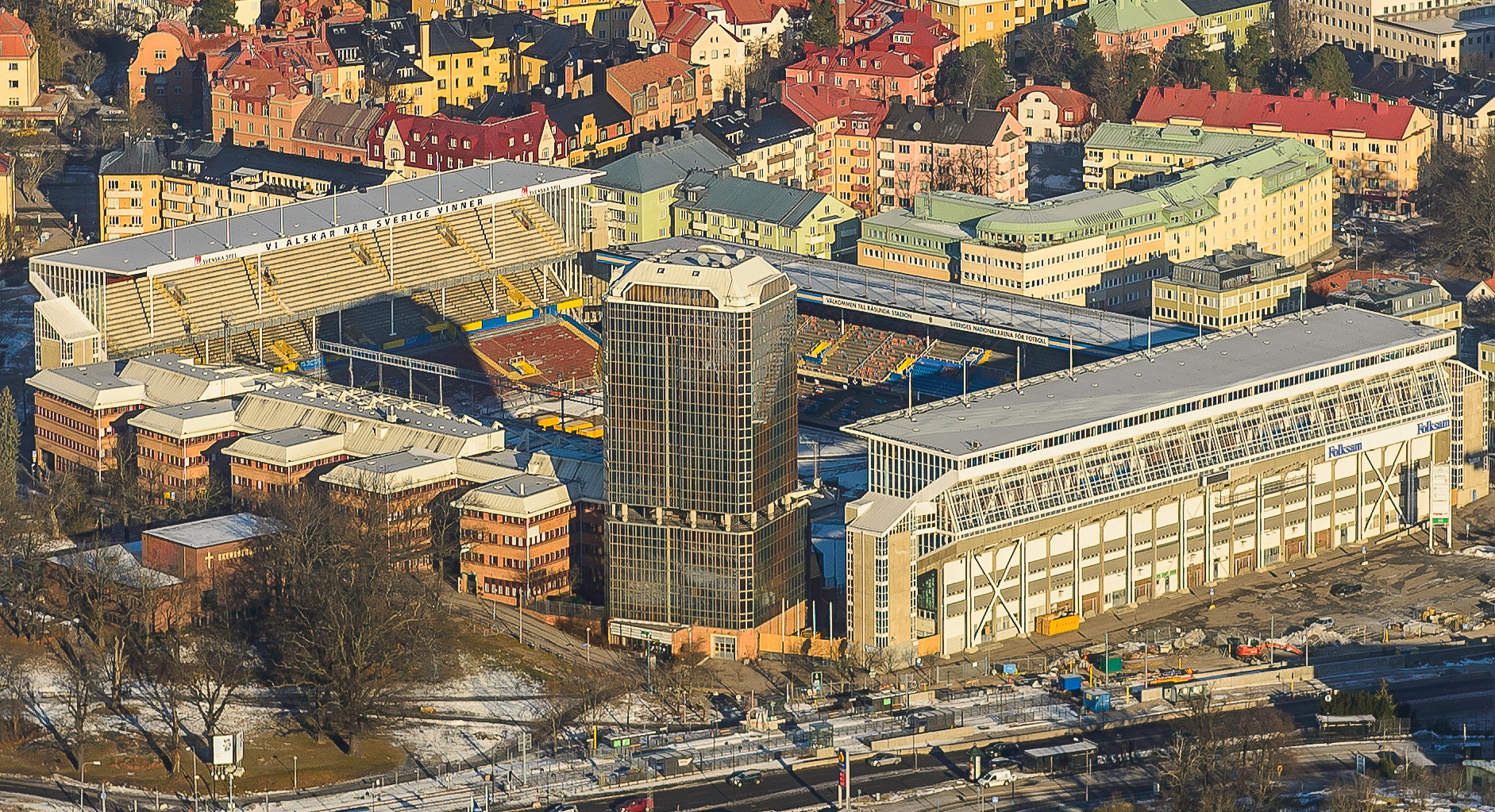
- Råsunda Stadium in February 2013
- Interactive map of Råsunda Stadium
- Full name: Råsunda Fotbollsstadion
- Location: Solna Municipality, Stockholms län, Sweden
- Coordinates: 59°21′46″N 17°59′47″E
- Owner: Swedish Football Association
- Capacity: 36,608
- Record attendance: 52,943
- Field size: 105 x 68 m

Construction
- Built: ?–1937
- Opened: 17 May 1937
- Renovated: 1985
- Expanded: 1958
- Demolished: 2013
- Architects: Birger Borgström; Sven Ivar Lind

Tenants
- Sweden men's national football team (1937–2013); AIK (1937–2013); Djurgårdens IF (1989–90, 2004)

Råsunda Stadium (Swedish: [ˈrôːˌsɵnːda]; also known as Råsunda Fotbollsstadion, Råsundastadion, Råsunda Football Stadium or just Råsunda) was the Swedish national football stadium. It was located in Solna Municipality in Stockholm and named after the district in Solna where it was located. The stadium was demolished in 2013 after being replaced by Nationalarenan.

== History ==
It was opened in 1937, although there had already existed stadiums at the site; the earliest opened in 1910. The inaugural match took place on 18 April 1937 when AIK played against Malmö FF, AIK won the match 4–0, with Axel Nilsson scoring the historical first goal. Råsunda had a capacity of 35,000–36,608 depending on usage. The 1910 stadium hosted some of the football and some of the shooting events at the 1912 Summer Olympics. The stadium was the home stadium for AIK, and was used for many derbies between Stockholm clubs. It also hosted the headquarters of the Swedish Football Association and staged 75% of the home matches of the national football team each year, with most other matches being played at Ullevi in Gothenburg. These two stadiums are UEFA 4-star rated football stadiums.

The record attendance was 52,943 and was set on 26 September 1965, when Sweden played West Germany. West Germany won the match 2–1.

The last major concert held at the stadium was on 7 June 1986, when British rock band Queen kicked off their final tour, The Magic Tour, at Råsunda. That night, Queen played to about 37,500 fans.

Råsunda was the first of two stadiums to have hosted the World Cup finals for both men and women. It hosted the men's final in the 1958 World Cup and the women's final in the 1995 Women's World Cup. The other stadium with this honor is the Rose Bowl in Pasadena, California, USA (men in 1994 World Cup, women in 1999 Women's World Cup).

== 1958 FIFA World Cup ==
Råsunda Stadium hosted eight games of the 1958 FIFA World Cup, including the final match.

Date	Time (UTC+01)	Team No. 1	Res.	Team No. 2	Round	Attendance
8 June 1958	14:00	Sweden	3–0	Mexico	Group 3	34,107
11 June 1958	19:00	Mexico	1–1	Wales	Group 3	15,150
12 June 1958	19:00	Sweden	2–1	Hungary	Group 3	38,850
15 June 1958	14:00	Sweden	0–0	Wales	Group 3	30,287
17 June 1958	19:00	Wales	2–1	Hungary	Group 3 Play-off	2,823
19 June 1958	19:00	Sweden	2–0	Soviet Union	Quarter-finals	31,900
24 June 1958	19:00	Brazil	5–2	France	Semi-finals	27,100
29 June 1958	15:00	Brazil	5–2	Sweden	Final	49,737

== 1995 FIFA Women's World Cup ==
Råsunda Stadium hosted the final match of the 1995 FIFA Women's World Cup.

Date	Time (UTC+01)	Team No. 1	Res.	Team No. 2	Round	Attendance
18 June 1995	18:00	Germany	0–2	Norway	Final	17,158

Preceded by 4 venues (Wankdorf Stadium, Charmilles Stadium; Hardturm, Stade olympique de la Pontaise) used for the 1954 FIFA World Cup, matches on the first day were all played at the same time	FIFA World Cup; Opening Venue; 1958	Succeeded by All 4 venues used for the 1962 FIFA World Cup, matches on the first day were all played at the same time
Preceded by Wankdorf Stadium; Bern	FIFA World Cup; Final Venue; 1958	Succeeded by Estadio Nacional; Santiago
Preceded by Tianhe Stadium; Guangzhou	FIFA Women's World Cup; Final Venue; 1995	Succeeded by Rose Bowl; Pasadena
Preceded by De Kuip; Rotterdam	UEFA Cup Winners Cup; Final Venue; 1998	Succeeded by Villa Park; Birmingham
