= Katja Kraus =

German former footballer and official

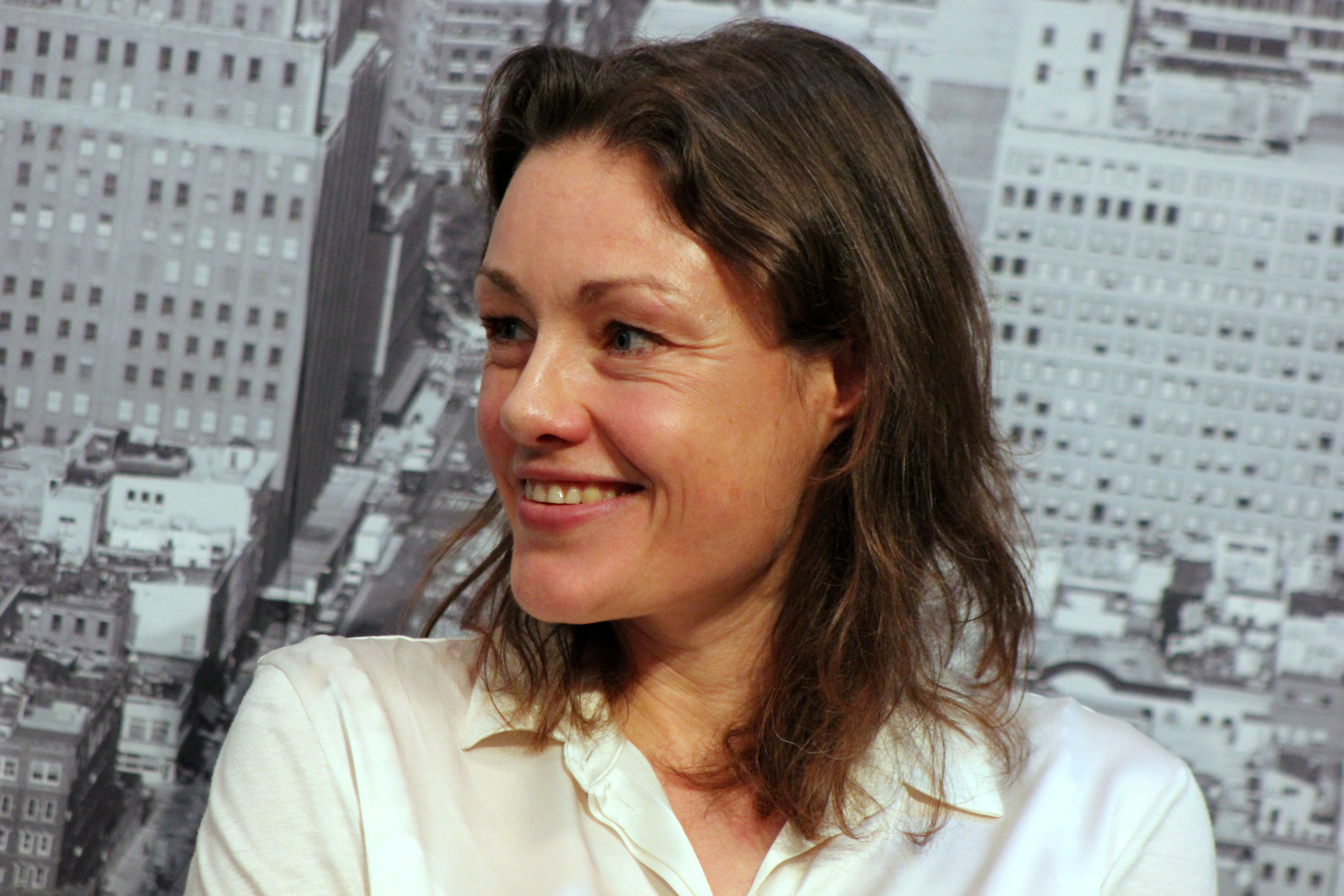
- Katja Kraus in 2015

Senior career*
Years	Team	Apps	(Gls)
- FSV Frankfurt
- * Club domestic league appearances and goals

Katja Kraus (born 23 November 1970, in Offenbach am Main) is a German former football player and official. She was the first German woman to be a board member of a Fußball-Bundesliga club, Hamburger SV.

== Early life ==
Kraus was born in Offenbach am Main, and graduated in Frankfurt in politics and German literature.

== Football career ==
Kraus joined FSV Frankfurt when she was 16 years old, and played 220 games for the club as goalkeeper in the Women's Fußball-Bundesliga, setting a Women's Bundesliga record in the 1996–97 season, when she played 1314 minutes without conceding a goal. She won the German championship with FSV Frankfurt three times, in 1985–86, 1994–95 and 1997–98, and the DFB cup four times, in 1989–90, 1991–92, 1994–95 and 1995–96. The first championship was before the Bundesliga had been established, the second was during the time that the Bundesliga was held as two regional leagues, and the third was the first championship held as a unified Bundesliga. The three championships were also the only German championships won by FSV Frankfurt.

Kraus played seven times (two of them as substitute) for the German national team between 25 May 1995 and 23 March 1997, and was runner-up in the World Cup in 1995 and winner of the European Championship in 1995, although she did not play in the final – Manuela Goller played in goal for Germany in that match. She was also in the German squad for the Summer Olympics in 1996, but was an unused substitute for all three matches, Manuela Goller playing in goal each time.

She played her last game on 28 May 1998.

== Later life: communication and marketing ==
Kraus joined Eintracht Frankfurt as a press speaker in June 1998, after she had worked on a few PR projects for Adidas during her studies. In October 1988, she joined Sportfive as head of corporate communications, where Bernd Hoffmann was a colleague. In March 2003, she became the first German woman to hold a position on the board of a Fußball-Bundesliga club when she joined Hamburger SV, for whom she was responsible for communication and marketing. In December 2007, her contract and the contract of Bernd Hoffmann were extended to December 2011. However, these contracts were terminated in March 2011.

In March 2017 she married Katrin Suder.

== Writing ==
After leaving Hamburger SV, Kraus wrote a book, Macht – Geschichten von Erfolg und Scheitern ISBN 978-3-10-038504-8 about power.
