= Ulrika Karlsson (footballer) =

Swedish footballer

Personal information
- Full name: Anna Ulrika Olsson
- Birth name: Anna Ulrika Karlsson
- Date of birth: 14 October 1970 (age 56)
- Place of birth: Österfärnebo, Sweden
- Height: 5 ft 9 in (1.75 m)
- Position: Goalkeeper

Youth career
- Österfärnebo IF

Senior career*
Years	Team	Apps	(Gls)
- Strömsbro/Sätra IF
1995–2000	Bälinge IF		
2001	San Diego Spirit	1	(0)
2001	Carolina Courage	0	(0)
2002–2004	Umeå IK		

International career^{‡}
1995–2001	Sweden	45	(0)
- * Club domestic league appearances and goals ‡ National team caps and goals as of 26 May 2013

Anna Ulrika Olsson (née Karlsson; born 14 October 1970) is a Swedish former football goalkeeper. She played for Bälinge IF and Umeå IK in the Swedish Damallsvenskan and spent time with San Diego Spirit and Carolina Courage while contracted to Women's United Soccer Association (WUSA) in 2001. Nicknamed "Ucka", Karlsson represented Sweden at senior international level, winning 45 caps between 1995 and 2001.

== Club career ==
Karlsson joined Bälinge IF in 1995. She would train with her local Swedish Football Division 5 male team and commute to Bälinge, more than a hundred miles away, for matches.

The owners of Women's United Soccer Association (WUSA), a new professional league in the United States, signed Karlsson and compatriot Kristin Bengtsson to a contract in 2001. Both players were drafted to San Diego Spirit in the 2000 WUSA foreign player allocation.

Karlsson kept goal in San Diego's first match, but was then replaced in the team by Jaime Pagliarulo. During the first season, Karlsson and Bengtsson were traded to Carolina Courage, for Bente Nordby and Wen Lirong. The move to Carolina was not a success, as Karlsson was unable to dislodge Kristin Luckenbill from the starting goalkeeper position.

Karlsson decided to move back to Sweden and joined Umeå IK ahead of the 2002 season. At Umeå Sofia Lundgren was the established goalkeeper. Lundgren played in the 2002 UEFA Women's Cup Final, with Karlsson on the substitutes' bench.

When Lundgren injured her knee in 2004, Karlsson was recalled to the team. She played in the UEFA Women's Cup quarter-final defeat to Djurgården/Älvsjö, making "a string of fine saves" as holders Umeå lost their title. With Lundgren back to full fitness, Karlsson left Umeå IK ahead of the 2005 season. She was linked with a further comeback in May 2005, when Lundgren had more knee trouble.

== International career ==
In September 1986, Karlsson played in Sweden's girls' national team first ever fixture. The team beat Norway 2–0 at Åråsen Stadion in Lillestrøm.

Karlsson went on to play 45 times for Sweden's national team. She made her senior international debut against Romania on 15 October 1995. At the 1996 Atlanta Olympics Karlsson made a substitute appearance in the Swedes' final group game, a 3–1 win over Denmark, when starting goalkeeper Annelie Nilsson was inadvertently injured by Lena Videkull's elbow.

Tired of the travelling and keen to do other things, Karlsson had intended to quit football in 1997. But a strong showing at UEFA Women's Euro 1997 meant she was chosen as Swedish Player of the Year, winning the Diamond Ball (Diamantbollen), and made her focus on the 1999 FIFA Women's World Cup. She left her job and used her late father's inheritance to be a full-time footballer.

In February 1999 Karlsson played in a FIFA World XI against the United States in San Jose, California. Karlsson's lack of first team football in WUSA caused her to lose her place in the national team to Caroline Jönsson ahead of UEFA Women's Euro 2001.
