= Solange (footballer) =

Brazilian footballer (born 1969)

Personal information
- Full name: Solange Santos Bastos
- Date of birth: 29 March 1969 (age 57)
- Position: Defender

Senior career*
Years	Team	Apps	(Gls)
- Euroexport (BA)

International career^{‡}
- Brazil
- * Club domestic league appearances and goals ‡ National team caps and goals as of 5 June 1995 (before the 1995 FIFA Women's World Cup)

Solange Santos Bastos (born 29 March 1969) is a Brazilian footballer who played as a defender for the Brazil women's national football team. She was part of the team at the 1991 FIFA Women's World Cup and 1995 FIFA Women's World Cup. At the club level, she played for Euroexport (BA) in Brazil.
