= Valeria (footballer, born 1968) =

Brazilian footballer

Personal information
- Full name: Valeria Aparecida Bonifacio
- Date of birth: 9 March 1968 (age 58)
- Position: Midfielder

Senior career*
Years	Team	Apps	(Gls)
- Lusa Sant'Anna

International career^{‡}
- Brazil
- * Club domestic league appearances and goals ‡ National team caps and goals as of 19 June 1999 (before the 1999 FIFA Women's World Cup)

Valeria Aparecida Bonifacio (born 9 March 1968) commonly known as Valeria is a Brazilian footballer who played as a midfielder for the Brazil women's national football team. She was part of the team at the 1995 FIFA Women's World Cup and 1999 FIFA Women's World Cup. At the club level, she played for Lusa Sant'Anna in Brazil.
