= Cenira =

Brazilian footballer (born 1965)

Personal information
- Full name: Cenira Sampaio Pereira do Prado
- Date of birth: 12 February 1965 (age 61)
- Place of birth: Rio de Janeiro, Brazil
- Height: 1.56 m (5 ft 1 1/2 in)
- Position: Attacking midfielder

Senior career*
| Years | Team | Apps | (Gls) |
- Madureira
- Flamengo
- Radar
- Vasco da Gama

International career^{‡}
- Brazil
- * Club domestic league appearances and goals as of 22:52, 29 April 2013 (UTC) ‡ National team caps and goals as of 22:52, 29 April 2013 (UTC)

Cenira Sampaio Pereira do Prado (born 12 February 1965), commonly known as Cenira, is a Brazilian former footballer who played as an attacking midfielder or playmaker for the Brazil women's national football team.

== Playing career ==
Cenira was a leading player at EC Radar when she was a teenager. After beginning her career at Madureira and spending a brief spell with Flamengo, she moved to Radar and scored 34 goals in 1984. In 1987 Cenira returned from the birth of her first child, Guilherme, to sign a professional contract for the new Vasco da Gama women's team. She missed Radar's trip to the 1988 FIFA Women's Invitation Tournament in Guangdong, where they represented Brazil and finished in third place.

In the 1991 FIFA Women's World Cup Cenira featured in all three group games; as a substitute in the 1–0 win over Japan and playing the full 80 minutes in defeats to the United States (0–5) and Sweden (0–2).

The Brazilian women's national team did not play another match for over three years, until a sponsorship from Maizena corn starch allowed them to play in the 1995 South American Women's Football Championship. Cenira was captain of the team and as the only married player, was seen as the team's mother figure. She retained the captaincy at the 1995 FIFA Women's World Cup in Sweden.

After Cenira was left out of the Brazil squad for the 1996 Atlanta Olympic Games, she gave an explosive interview to Placar magazine which lifted the lid on the team's internal politics. Excoriating the Brazilian Football Confederation's (CBF) women's football chief, she claimed, variously, that players still close to Radar boss Eurico Lira had been frozen out, players were being bullied into moving to certain clubs, and that certain players were only picked to keep other players happy.

== Personal life ==
Cenira married Sérgio Luís, the massage therapist of the Brazil women's national team. She had two children during her playing career and was the proprietor of a sandwich trailer in Rio.
