= Ademar Fonseca =

Brazilian football manager

Personal information
- Full name: Ademar Fonseca Nogueira Júnior
- Date of birth: 17 April 1963
- Date of death: 8 June 2017 (aged 54)

Managerial career
- Years: Team
- 1995: Brazil Women
- 2006: Venezuela Women

Ademar Fonseca Nogueira Júnior (17 April 1963 – 8 June 2017), commonly known as Dema, was a Brazilian football manager.

== Career ==
Fonseca was the head coach of the Brazil women's national team at the 1995 FIFA Women's World Cup.
