= Eva Larsson =

Swedish former footballer (born 1973)

Personal information
- Full name: Anna Eva Margaretha Larsson
- Date of birth: 27 February 1973 (age 53)
- Place of birth: Kungälv, Sweden
- Position: Goalkeeper

Senior career*
Years	Team	Apps	(Gls)
- Jitex BK
1998	Älvsjö AIK		

International career
	Sweden U17	4	(0)
	Sweden U23	31	(1)
1997–1998	Sweden	3	(0)
- * Club domestic league appearances and goals

Anna Eva Margaretha Larsson (born 27 February 1973) is a Swedish former footballer who played as a goalkeeper. She was part of the Sweden women's national football team at the 1996 Summer Olympics, but did not play.

== Career ==
Larsson played club football for Jitex BK and Älvsjö AIK in Sweden. She made her international debut for Sweden on 30 October 1997, playing in the 1–3 loss to the United States. She made her second appearance as a substitute in the 0–4 loss against China on 24 January 1998, before earning her final cap on 17 March 1998 against Portugal, which finished as a 2–0 win.

== Career statistics ==
=== International ===
Sweden
Year	Apps	Goals
1997	1	0
1998	2	0
Total	3	0

== See also ==
- Sweden at the 1996 Summer Olympics
