= Sofia Johansson =

Swedish footballer

Personal information
- Date of birth: 5 September 1969 (age 57)
- Position: Midfielder

Senior career*
Years	Team	Apps	(Gls)
- Malmö

International career^{‡}
	Sweden	6	(1)
- * Club domestic league appearances and goals ‡ National team caps and goals as of 2017

Sofia Johansson (born 5 September 1969) is a Swedish footballer who played as a midfielder for the Sweden women's national football team. She was part of the team at the 1995 FIFA Women's World Cup. On club level she played for Malmö in Sweden.
