= Leda Maria =

Brazilian footballer

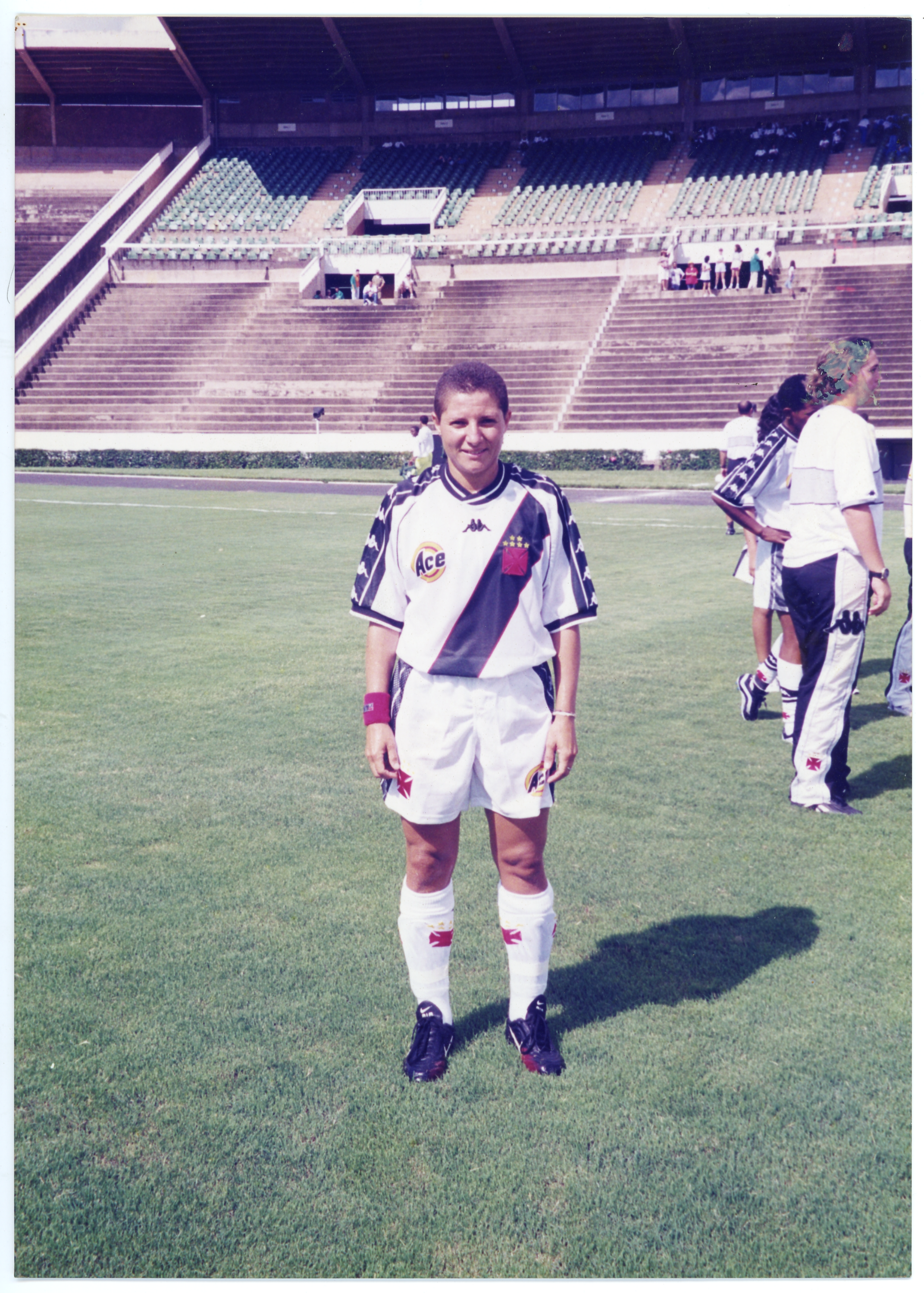
- Leda Maria, playing in Vasco da Gama, 1998

Personal information
- Full name: Leda Maria Cozer Abreu
- Date of birth: 16 April 1966 (age 60)
- Place of birth: Brazil
- Position: Midfielder

Senior career*
Years	Team	Apps	(Gls)
- Vasco da Gama

International career
1995–1996	Brazil		
- * Club domestic league appearances and goals

Leda Maria Cozer Abreu (born 16 April 1966) is a former Brazilian football player.

She was part of the Brazil women's national football team at the 1995 South American Women's Football Championship and played in two matches at the 1995 FIFA Women's World Cup in Sweden. She was named as an alternate at the 1996 Summer Olympics, but did not participate.

== Commentator ==
At the 2016 Summer Olympics, she worked as a commentator for women’s football on SporTV.

== See also ==
- Brazil at the 1996 Summer Olympics
