= Pernilla Bowall =

Swedish footballer

Personal information
- Date of birth: 16 August 1972 (age 54)
- Place of birth: Sweden
- Position: Midfielder

Senior career*
Years	Team	Apps	(Gls)
- Jitex BK/JG 93

International career
1988–1989	Sweden U16	7	(0)
1991–1993	Sweden U21	24	(1)
1994–1996	Sweden	7	(0)
- * Club domestic league appearances and goals

Pernilla Bowall (born 16 August 1972) is a Swedish former football player who played for the Sweden women's national football team. She represented Sweden at the 1996 Summer Olympics.

== Career statistics ==
=== International ===
Sweden
Year	Apps	Goals
1994	2	0
1996	5	0
Total	7	0
