= Didi (footballer, born 1963) =

Brazilian footballer

Personal information
- Full name: Diedja Maglione Roque Barreto
- Date of birth: 22 September 1963 (age 63)
- Place of birth: João Pessoa, Paraíba, Brazil
- Height: 1.71 m (5 ft 7 in)
- Position: Goalkeeper

Senior career*
Years	Team	Apps	(Gls)
- Saad EC
1997	São Paulo FC		
- Lusa Sant'Anna

International career
1996–1999	Brazil		
- * Club domestic league appearances and goals

Diedja Maglione Roque Barreto (born 22 September 1963), commonly known as Didi, is a Brazilian football coach and former goalkeeper.

She was part of the Brazil women's national football team. She competed at the 1996 Summer Olympics, playing one match as the understudy to Meg. At club level she played for Saad EC. In 1997 she joined São Paulo FC where she won state and national titles. She played in a 3–0 friendly defeat by the United States on 22 May 1999 at the Citrus Bowl in Orlando, Florida, while attached to the Lusa Sant'Anna club.

After her playing retirement she moved to the Chicago metropolitan area, where she coached in youth and college soccer.

== See also ==
- Brazil at the 1996 Summer Olympics
