= Anneli Wahlgren =

Swedish footballer

Personal information
- Date of birth: 15 January 1971 (age 55)
- Place of birth: Sweden
- Position: Forward

Senior career*
Years	Team	Apps	(Gls)
1996	Bälinge IF		

International career
	Sweden	17	(3)
- * Club domestic league appearances and goals

Anneli Wahlgren (born 15 January 1971) is a female former Swedish football forward.

She was part of the Sweden women's national football team at the 1996 Summer Olympics, but did not play. On club level she played for Bälinge IF.

== See also ==
- Sweden at the 1996 Summer Olympics
