= Maki Haneta =

Japanese footballer

Maki Haneta 埴田 真紀
Personal information
- Full name: Maki Haneta
- Date of birth: 30 September 1972 (age 54)
- Place of birth: Japan
- Height: 1.60 m (5 ft 3 in)
- Position: Defender

Senior career*
Years	Team	Apps	(Gls)
- Matsushita Electric Panasonic Bambina

International career
1993–1997	Japan	30	(1)
Medal record
Matsushita Electric Panasonic Bambina
Winner	Nadeshiko League	1994
Runner-up	Nadeshiko League Cup	1998
Representing Japan
AFC Women's Asian Cup
Silver medal – second place	1995 Malaysia
Bronze medal – third place	1993 Malaysia
Asian Games
Silver medal – second place	1994 Hiroshima	Team
- * Club domestic league appearances and goals

Maki Haneta (埴田 真紀, Haneta Maki; born 30 September 1972) is a former Japanese football player. She played for Japan national team.

== Club career ==
Haneta was born on 30 September 1972. She played for Matsushita Electric Panasonic Bambina. In 1994 season, the club won L.League championship and she was selected MVP awards. She was also selected Best Eleven 4 times (1993, 1994, 1996 and 1998).

== National team career ==
In December 1993, Haneta was selected Japan national team for 1993 AFC Championship. At this competition, on 4 December, she debuted and scored a goal against Chinese Taipei. She also played at 1994 Asian Games and 1995 AFC Championship. She was a member of Japan for 1995 World Cup and 1996 Summer Olympics. She played 30 games and scored 1 goal for Japan until 1997.

== National team statistics ==
Japan national team
Year	Apps	Goals
1993	5	1
1994	7	0
1995	8	0
1996	9	0
1997	1	0
Total	30	1
