= CR Vasco da Gama (women) =

Vasco da Gama
- Full name: Club de Regatas Vasco da Gama Feminino
- Nickname: As Meninas da Colina (The Girls of the Hill)
- Founded: 23 August 1923; 103 years ago (informal team); 1987; 39 years ago (official team)
- Ground: São Januário
- Capacity: 21,880
- Manager: Antony Lima Menezes
- League: Campeonato Brasileiro Série A2; Campeonato Carioca
- 2025 2025: Série A2, 11th of 16; Carioca, 4th of 8
| Home colours | Away colours |

Club de Regatas Vasco da Gama Feminino, commonly referred to as Vasco Feminino, is a Brazilian women's football team based in Rio de Janeiro. It is the women's football section of CR Vasco da Gama. The team competes in the Campeonato Brasileiro de Futebol Feminino Série A1, the top tier of the Brazilian women's football league system, and play their home matches in São Januário.

Before the team was officially founded in 1987, female members and supporters had already started an informal team in 1923 called Sport Club Feminino Vasco da Gama—which was the first such team in Brazil. This team competed until 1941, when women's football was banned in the country.

Vasco has featured various international players on its teams, such as Marta, Pretinha, Cenira, Fanta, and Meg, among others.

== History ==
Vasco da Gama women's team was founded in 1987 and signed professional players including Cenira. They competed in the Campeonato Carioca de Futebol Feminino for the first time that year, finishing last of six teams. In 1988 they improved to finish runners-up to the dominant EC Radar team of the era.

In the 1990s Vasco's women's team enjoyed the patronage of the club's influential director Eurico Miranda and enjoyed sustained success. The coach Helena Pacheco assembled a strong team with several Brazil national team players and also set up a thriving residential youth system at the São Januário stadium. When the Campeonato Carioca was re-instated in 1996, Vasco won it five times in succession. They won four national titles (1993, 1994, 1995 and 1998) and in 2000 signed a 14-year-old Marta to their youth team. The entire women's section was disbanded for financial reasons in 2002.

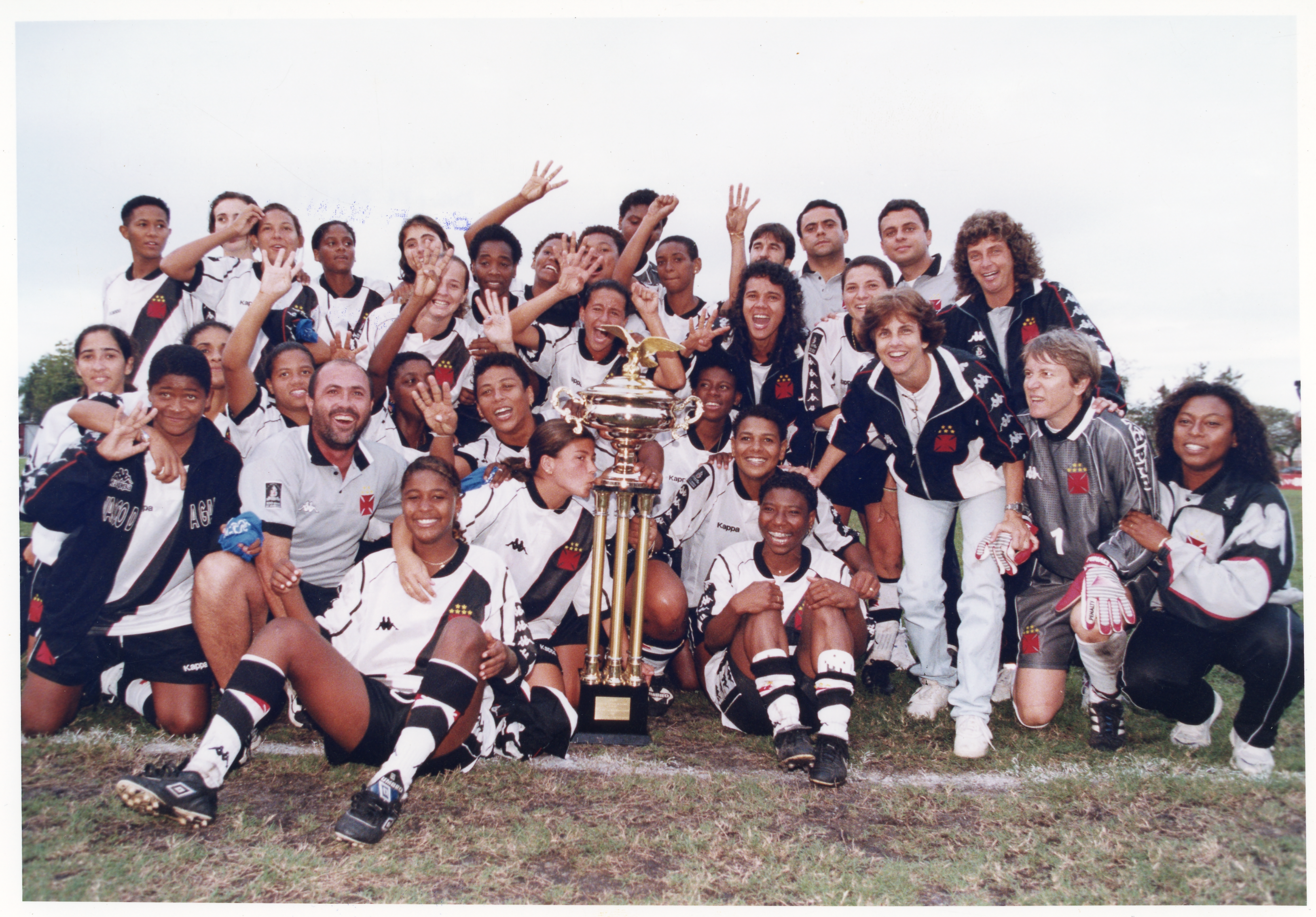
Vasco Feminino team in 1998.

Vasco entered the 2007 Copa do Brasil de Futebol Feminino but, when negotiations to partner with Saad Esporte Clube failed, team coach Marisa Pires Nogueira had only 15 days to prepare her young and inexperienced team for the competition. They were heavily beaten by Benfica (who had partnered with CEPE-Caxias) in the opening round.

In 2010 Vasco made an agreement with the Brazilian Navy to run a women's football team in partnership with them. It was intended to help prepare the Navy team to function as the Brazil women's military national football team in the Football at the Military World Games competition at the 2011 Military World Games, hosted in Rio de Janeiro.

After another period of inactivity, an adult women's team was relaunched again in 2016. The experienced former national team player Ester was signed to provide guidance to the younger players.

== Stadium ==
Although Vasco's women's team host some matches at São Januário, they also play at the smaller Estádio Nivaldo Pereira in nearby Nova Iguaçu.

== Honours ==
=== Official tournaments ===
| Type | Competition | Titles | Seasons |
|---|---|---|---|
| National | Campeonato Brasileiro (first level) | 4 | 1993, 1994, 1995, 1998 |
| State | Campeonato Carioca | 8 | 1996, 1997, 1998, 1999, 2000, 2010, 2012, 2013 |

=== Others ===
- Campeonato Brasileiro Série A2: 2026
- Campeonato Brasileiro Série A3: 2024
- Torneio Início Carioca: 2000, 2001

=== Youth team ===
- Campeonato Carioca Sub-20: 2009
- Campeonato Carioca Sub-18: 2019
- Campeonato Carioca Sub-17: 2011, 2012, 2013, 2014, 2015

== Players ==
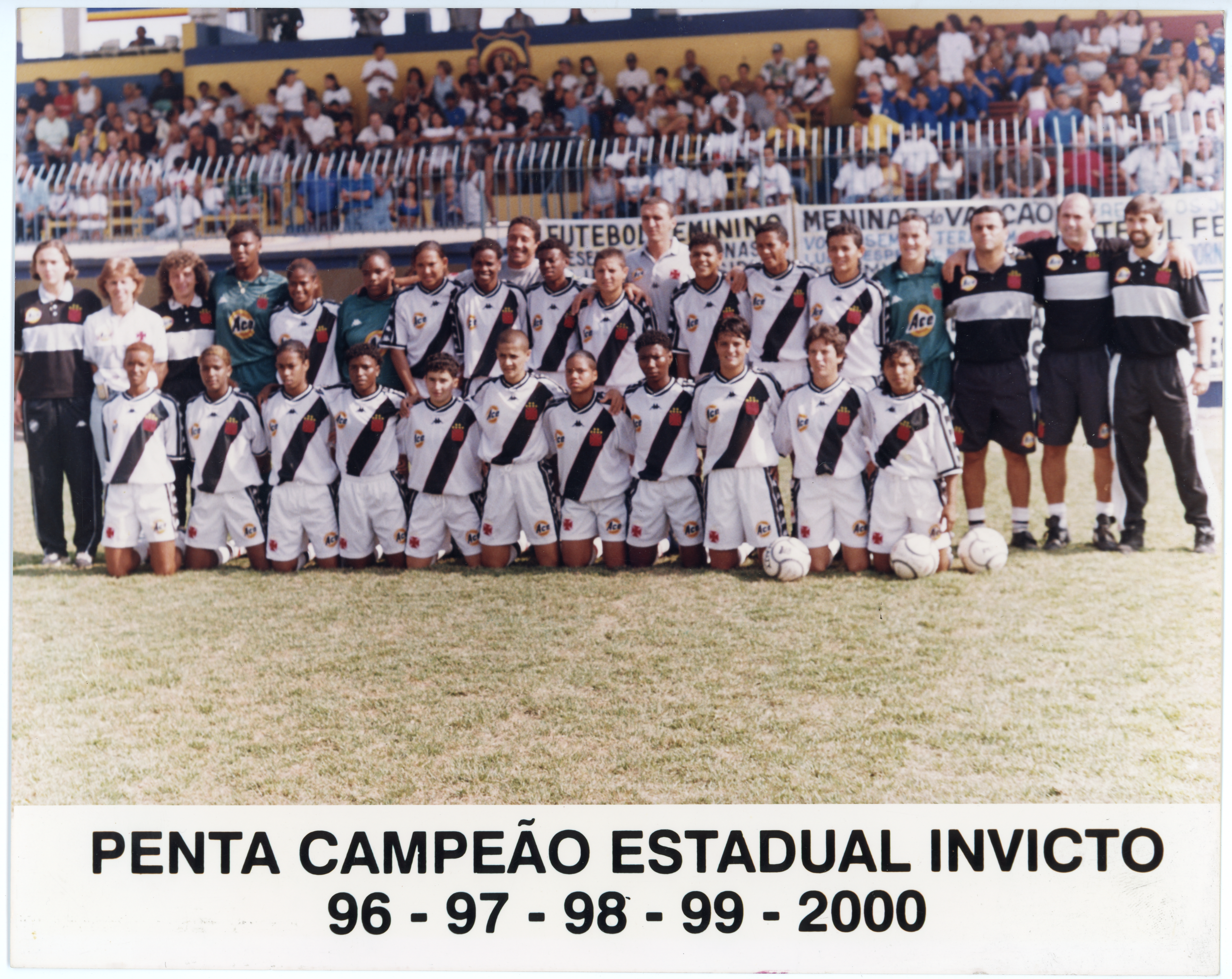
Vasco team photo in 2000

Vasco provided 10 players to Brazil's squad for the 1995 South American Women's Football Championship in Uberlândia. By the 1999 FIFA Women's World Cup, Vasco's Pretinha and Fanta were the only players in the 20-strong squad who were not contracted to a club in São Paulo.

=== Former players ===
For details of current and former players with a Wikipedia article, see Category:CR Vasco da Gama (women) players.
