= Anneli Olsson =

Swedish footballer

Personal information
- Date of birth: 7 February 1967 (age 59)
- Position: Midfielder

Senior career*
Years	Team	Apps	(Gls)
–1987	AIK		
1988–1996	Hammarby IF	186	(58)

International career^{‡}
- Sweden
- * Club domestic league appearances and goals ‡ National team caps and goals as of 5 June 1995 (before the 1995 FIFA Women's World Cup)

Anneli Olsson (born 7 February 1967) is a Swedish footballer who played as a midfielder for the Sweden women's national football team. She was part of the team at the 1995 FIFA Women's World Cup. On club level she played for Hammarby IF in Sweden.
