= Fanta (footballer) =

Brazilian footballer (born 1966)

Personal information
- Full name: Rosilane Camargo Motta
- Date of birth: 14 September 1966 (age 60)
- Place of birth: Rio de Janeiro, Brazil
- Height: 1.69 m (5 ft 6 1/2 in)
- Position: Defensive midfielder

Senior career*
Years	Team	Apps	(Gls)
- Radar
- Vasco da Gama

International career^{‡}
- Brazil
- * Club domestic league appearances and goals as of 22:52, 27 April 2013 (UTC) ‡ National team caps and goals as of 22:52, 27 April 2013 (UTC)

Rosilane Camargo Motta (born 14 September 1966), commonly known as Fanta, is a Brazilian former football player. She was a "volante" (defensive midfielder) for the Brazil women's national football team. Her nickname is derived from "Fantasma", 'ghost' or 'phantom', which was given to her by a former coach who complained about her absence in pre-game preparations.

Fanta was part of the EC Radar club team who represented Brazil at the 1988 FIFA Women's Invitation Tournament in Guangdong and finished in third place.

In the 1991 FIFA Women's World Cup, Fanta played the full 80 minutes in all three group games as Brazil went out in the first round.

The Brazilian women's national team did not play another match for over three years, until a sponsorship from Maizena corn starch allowed them to play in the 1995 South American Women's Football Championship. Fanta, by then playing her club football with Vasco, was recalled to the squad. In the subsequent 1995 FIFA Women's World Cup, Fanta was ever-present again—this time over three 90 minute matches—as Brazil made another group stage exit from the competition.

Due to 1995 World Cup quarter finalists England renouncing their place at the 1996 Atlanta Olympic Games, Brazil qualified and selected Fanta for their run to the semi-finals. Brazil and Fanta also reached the semi-finals at the 1999 FIFA Women's World Cup.
