= Suzy (footballer) =

Brazilian footballer (born 1967)

Personal information
- Full name: Suzy Bittencourt de Oliveira
- Date of birth: 7 February 1967 (age 59)
- Place of birth: Brazil
- Position: Defender

Senior career*
Years	Team	Apps	(Gls)
1996	Vasco da Gama		

International career
1996	Brazil		
- * Club domestic league appearances and goals

Suzy Bittencourt de Oliveira, commonly known as Suzy, (born 7 February 1967) is a Brazilian football defender who played for the Brazil women's national football team. She competed at the 1996 Summer Olympics, playing 2 matches. At the club level, she played for Vasco da Gama.

== See also ==
- Brazil at the 1996 Summer Olympics
