= Gro Espeseth =

Norwegian footballer (born 1972)

Personal information
- Full name: Gro Espeseth
- Date of birth: 30 October 1972 (age 54)
- Place of birth: Stord Municipality, Norway
- Height: 1.72 m (5 ft 7 1/2 in)
- Position: Centre-back

Youth career
- Ådnamarka
- 1989–1990: IL Bjørnar

Senior career*
Years	Team	Apps	(Gls)
1991–1998	IL Sandviken		
1999–2000	Trondheims-Ørn	8	(0)
2001	New York Power	20	(1)
2007	IL Sandviken	1	(0)

International career^{‡}
1991–2000	Norway	105	(9)
Medal record
Women's football
Representing Norway
Olympic Games
Gold medal – first place	2000 Sydney	Team
Bronze medal – third place	1996 Atlanta	Team
World Cup
Gold medal – first place	Sweden 1995	Team
Silver medal – second place	China 1991	Team
European Championship
Gold medal – first place	Italy 1993	Team
Silver medal – second place	Denmark 1991	Team
- * Club domestic league appearances and goals as of 14:16, 20 September 2014 (UTC) ‡ National team caps and goals as of 14:16, 20 September 2014 (UTC)

Gro Espeseth (born 30 October 1972) is a former Norwegian footballer, world champion and olympic champion.

She played for the clubs Sandviken and Trondheims-Ørn, debuted for the Norwegian national team in 1991, and played 105 matches for the national team.

She received a bronze medal at the 1996 Summer Olympics in Atlanta, and a gold medal at the 2000 Summer Olympics in Sydney.

== Club career ==
With Sandviken Espeseth won the 1995 Norwegian Women's Cup, scoring twice in the 3–2 final win over Trondheims-Ørn, including the extra time winner. She had an offer to join Japanese L. League club Suzuyo Shimizu F.C. Lovely Ladies, but the transfer fell through when she failed the medical.

Espeseth signed for the professional Women's United Soccer Association (WUSA) ahead of the inaugural season in 2001. She was allocated to New York Power alongside compatriot Ann Kristin Aarønes. Knee damage meant that she was only able to play for one season before retiring.

In 2007 Espeseth returned to football as an assistant coach with her former club Sandviken. Due to the unavailability of several players, she made a guest appearance as a player in July 2007, six years after her retirement. She was substituted after 40 minutes of Sandviken's Toppserien 9–0 defeat by Røa IL.

== Honours ==
=== Olympics ===
- Atlanta 1996 – bronze
- Sydney 2000 – gold

=== FIFA Women's World Cup ===
- 1991 FIFA World Cup in China – silver
- 1995 FIFA World Cup in Sweden – gold

== Personal life ==
Espeseth gave birth to son Brage in 2002.

== See also ==
- List of women's footballers with 100 or more international caps
