= Anouschka Bernhard =

German footballer (1970–2026)

Personal information
- Date of birth: 5 October 1970
- Place of birth: Waiblingen, Baden-Württemberg, West Germany
- Date of death: 15 January 2026 (aged 55)
- Position: Defender

Senior career*
Years	Team	Apps	(Gls)
1989–1993	VfL Sindelfingen		
1993–1998	FSV Frankfurt		
2000	FSV Frankfurt		

International career
	Germany	47	(1)

Managerial career
- 1998–1999: FSV Frankfurt
- 2000: FSV Frankfurt
- 2011–2020: Germany U16+U17
- * Club domestic league appearances and goals

Anouschka Bernhard (5 October 1970 – 15 January 2026) was a German footballer who played as a defender. She was a member of the Germany national team, among others at the 1995 FIFA Women's World Cup. On club level she played for VfL Sindelfingen and FSV Frankfurt in Germany.

Bernhard died after a serious illness on 15 January 2026, at the age of 55.
