= Ann Kristin Aarønes =

Norwegian footballer (born 1973)

Personal information
- Full name: Ann Kristin Aarønes
- Date of birth: 19 January 1973 (age 53)
- Place of birth: Ålesund, Norway
- Height: 1.82 m (6 ft 0 in)
- Position: Forward

Senior career*
Years	Team	Apps	(Gls)
- Spjelkavik
1993–2000	Trondheims-Ørn		
2001	New York Power	15	(3)

International career^{‡}
1990–1999	Norway	111	(60)
Medal record
Women's football
Representing Norway
Olympic Games
Bronze medal – third place	1996 Atlanta	Team
World Cup
Gold medal – first place	1995 Sweden	Team
European Championship
Gold medal – first place	1993 Italy	Team
Silver medal – second place	1991 Denmark	Team
- * Club domestic league appearances and goals as of 21:24, 10 December 2014 (UTC) ‡ National team caps and goals as of 21:24, 10 December 2014 (UTC)

Ann Kristin Aarønes (born 19 January 1973) is a Norwegian former footballer. She first played for Spjelkavik IL, then for Trondheims-Ørn and the Norwegian national team. Later she played for the WUSA's New York Power, during the club's first season of play in 2001.

== Club career ==
At club level with Trondheims-Ørn she won six Norwegian Women's Cup competitions and five Toppserien championships between 1993 and 2000.

Aarønes signed for the professional Women's United Soccer Association (WUSA) ahead of the inaugural season in 2001. She was allocated to New York Power alongside compatriot Gro Espeseth. Plagued by lower back and hamstring injuries, she was only able to play for one season before retiring.

== International career ==
In September 1990 Aarønes won her first cap for the Norway women's national football team at Old Trafford in a 0–0 1991 UEFA Women's Championship qualification draw with England.

Aarønes played 111 senior international matches for Norway between 1990 and 1999, scoring 60 goals. She was the top scorer at the 1995 FIFA Women's World Cup, which was won by Norway. She scored a hat-trick at this World Cup against Canada. Also with the Norway team she won bronze at the inaugural Olympic women's football tournament at Atlanta 1996. In 1993 she became a European Champion with Norway, having been a runner-up in 1991. Aarønes also played for Norway in Euro 1997 and at the 1999 FIFA Women's World Cup. She was included in the All-star team in 1999, although Norway failed to defend their title.

== International goals ==
No.	Date	Venue	Opponent	Score	Result	Competition
1.	23 May 1992	Modum, Norway	Switzerland	6–0	6–0	UEFA Women's Euro 1993 qualifying
2.	26 September 1992	Kolbotn, Norway	Belgium	1–0	8–0	UEFA Women's Euro 1993 qualifying
3.	26 September 1992	Kolbotn, Norway	Belgium	5–0	8–0	UEFA Women's Euro 1993 qualifying
4.	4 September 1993	Gvarv, Norway	Czech Republic	1–0	6–1	UEFA Women's Euro 1995 qualifying
5.	4 September 1993	Gvarv, Norway	Czech Republic	3–1	6–1	UEFA Women's Euro 1995 qualifying
6.	4 September 1993	Gvarv, Norway	Czech Republic	4–1	6–1	UEFA Women's Euro 1995 qualifying
7.	16 October 1993	Bergen, Norway	Hungary	7–0	8–0	UEFA Women's Euro 1995 qualifying
8.	16 March 1994	Portimão, Portugal	Finland	2–0	6–0	1994 Algarve Cup
9.	16 March 1994	Portimão, Portugal	Finland	3–0	6–0	1994 Algarve Cup
10.	18 March 1994	Vila Real de Santo António, Portugal	Denmark	1–1	6–1	1994 Algarve Cup
11.	18 March 1994	Vila Real de Santo António, Portugal	Denmark	5–1	6–1	1994 Algarve Cup
12.	20 March 1994	Faro, Portugal	United States	1–0	1–0	1994 Algarve Cup
13.	21 May 1994	Vantaa, Finland	Finland	1–?	2–2	UEFA Women's Euro 1995 qualifying
14.	4 June 1994	Budapest, Hungary	Hungary	2–0	4–0	UEFA Women's Euro 1995 qualifying
15.	4 September 1994	Oslo, Norway	Finland	3–0	4–0	UEFA Women's Euro 1995 qualifying
16.	24 September 1994	Prague, Czech Republic	Czech Republic	2–0	9–0	UEFA Women's Euro 1995 qualifying
17.	26 February 1995	Kristiansand, Norway	Sweden	1–1	4–3	UEFA Women's Euro 1995
18.	26 February 1995	Kristiansand, Norway	Sweden	3–3	4–3	UEFA Women's Euro 1995
19.	16 March 1995	Quarteira, Portugal	Italy	?–?	3–1	1995 Algarve Cup
20.	6 June 1995	Karlstad, Sweden	Nigeria	4–0	8–0	1995 FIFA Women's World Cup
21.	6 June 1995	Karlstad, Sweden	Nigeria	8–0	8–0	1995 FIFA Women's World Cup
22.	10 June 1995	Gävle, Sweden	Canada	1–0	7–0	1995 FIFA Women's World Cup
23.	10 June 1995	Gävle, Sweden	Canada	3–0	7–0	1995 FIFA Women's World Cup
24.	10 June 1995	Gävle, Sweden	Canada	7–0	7–0	1995 FIFA Women's World Cup
25.	15 June 1995	Västerås, Sweden	United States	1–0	1–0	1995 FIFA Women's World Cup
26.	19 September 1995	Ulefoss, Norway	Slovakia	2–0	17–0	UEFA Women's Euro 1997 qualifying
27.	19 September 1995	Ulefoss, Norway	Slovakia	10–0	17–0	UEFA Women's Euro 1997 qualifying
28.	19 September 1995	Ulefoss, Norway	Slovakia	13–0	17–0	UEFA Women's Euro 1997 qualifying
29.	19 September 1995	Ulefoss, Norway	Slovakia	14–0	17–0	UEFA Women's Euro 1997 qualifying
30.	19 September 1995	Ulefoss, Norway	Slovakia	17–0	17–0	UEFA Women's Euro 1997 qualifying
31.	17 March 1996	Quarteira, Portugal	Sweden	1–0	4–0	1996 Algarve Cup
32.	17 March 1996	Quarteira, Portugal	Sweden	4–0	4–0	1996 Algarve Cup
33.	21 July 1996	Washington D.C., United States	Brazil	2–1	2–2	1996 Summer Olympics
34.	23 July 1996	Washington D.C., United States	Germany	1–0	3–2	1996 Summer Olympics
35.	1 August 1996	Athens, United States	Brazil	1–0	2–0	1996 Summer Olympics
36.	1 August 1996	Athens, United States	Brazil	2–0	2–0	1996 Summer Olympics
37.	31 August 1997	Oslo, Norway	Australia	1–0	7–1	Friendly
38.	23 June 1999	Landover, United States	Canada	1–0	7–1	1999 FIFA Women's World Cup
39.	23 June 1999	Landover, United States	Canada	2–1	7–1	1999 FIFA Women's World Cup
40.	26 June 1999	Chicago, United States	Japan	3–0	4–0	1999 FIFA Women's World Cup
41.	30 June 1999	San Jose, United States	Sweden	1–0	3–1	1999 FIFA Women's World Cup
42.	11 September 1999	Strusshamn, Norway	Switzerland	2–0	4–0	UEFA Women's Euro 2001 qualifying
43.	23 October 1999	Sesimbra, Portugal	Portugal	1–0	4–0	UEFA Women's Euro 2001 qualifying
44.	23 October 1999	Sesimbra, Portugal	Portugal	2–0	4–0	UEFA Women's Euro 2001 qualifying
45.	23 October 1999	Sesimbra, Portugal	Portugal	4–0	4–0	UEFA Women's Euro 2001 qualifying

== See also ==
- List of women's footballers with 100 or more international caps
