= Ursula Lohn =

German footballer

Personal information
- Date of birth: 7 November 1966 (age 59)
- Place of birth: Cologne, Germany
- Position: Midfielder

Senior career*
Years	Team	Apps	(Gls)
- TuS Ahrbach

International career^{‡}
	Germany	20	
- * Club domestic league appearances and goals ‡ National team caps and goals as of 5 June 1995 (before the 1995 FIFA Women's World Cup)

Ursula Lohn (born 7 November 1966 in Cologne) is a German footballer who played as a midfielder for the Germany women's national football team. She was part of the team at the 1995 FIFA Women's World Cup. At the club level, she played for TuS Ahrbach in Germany.

== International goals ==
No.	Date	Venue	Opponent	Score	Result	Competition
1.	2 July 1989	Stadion an der Bremer Brücke, Osnabrück, Germany	Norway	1–0	4–1	1989 European Competition for Women's Football
2.	2 July 1989	Stadion an der Bremer Brücke, Osnabrück, Germany	Norway	2–0	4–1	1989 European Competition for Women's Football
