= Annika Nessvold =

Swedish footballer

Personal information
- Date of birth: 24 February 1971 (age 55)
- Place of birth: Värnamo, Sweden
- Position: Defender

Senior career*
| Years | Team | Apps | (Gls) |
| 1996 | Malmö FF | | |

International career
| | Sweden | 35 | (6) |
- * Club domestic league appearances and goals

Annika Nessvold (born 24 February 1971) is a former Swedish football defender. She was part of the Sweden women's national football team. She competed at the 1996 Summer Olympics, playing three matches. At the club level Nessvold played for Malmö FF.

== See also ==
- Sweden at the 1996 Summer Olympics
