= Annelie Nilsson =

Swedish footballer

Personal information
- Date of birth: 14 June 1971 (age 55)
- Place of birth: Sweden
- Position: Goalkeeper

Senior career*
Years	Team	Apps	(Gls)
1996	Sunnanå SK		

International career
1996	Sweden	31 (?)	
- * Club domestic league appearances and goals

Annelie Nilsson (born 14 June 1971) was a female Swedish football goalkeeper. She was part of the Sweden women's national football team. She competed at the 1996 Summer Olympics, playing 3 matches. On club level she played for Sunnanå SK.

== See also ==
- Sweden at the 1996 Summer Olympics
