= Bengt Simonsson =

Swedish football manager

Bengt Simonson
Personal information
- Date of birth: 8 October 1945 (age 81)
- Place of birth: Stockholm, Sweden

Managerial career
- Years: Team
- 1978–1979: Dingtuna GIF
- 1980–1981: IFK Västerås
- 1983–1986: IFK Västerås
- 1988–1989: IFK Västerås
- 1990–1992: Gideonsbergs IF (women)
- 1992–1996: Sweden (women)

Bengt Simonson (born 8 October 1945) is a Swedish football manager.

== Career ==
Simonsson began his managerial career with Dingtuna GIF and IFK Västerås, before becoming coach of the Gideonsbergs IF women's team of the Damallsvenskan in 1990. In 1992, he became the manager of the Sweden women's national team, coaching the team at the 1995 FIFA Women's World Cup and 1996 Summer Olympics.
