= Åsa Lönnqvist =

Swedish footballer

Personal information
- Date of birth: 14 April 1970 (age 56)
- Place of birth: Sweden
- Position: Defender

Senior career*
Years	Team	Apps	(Gls)
1994–2000	Tyresö FF		

International career
1993–2000	Sweden	76	(1)
- * Club domestic league appearances and goals

Åsa Lönnqvist is a Swedish retired football player who played in the defender position who played for the Sweden women's national football team and Tyresö FF.

== Career ==
She represented Sweden at the 1995 FIFA Women's World Cup, 1999 FIFA Women's World Cup as well as the 1996 Summer Olympics and 2000 Summer Olympics.

== Other work ==
Following her playing career, Lönnqvist was named to the board of Tyresö FF. In March 2011, she was also elected to the Board of Appeals at the Swedish Football Association.

Lönnqvist has served on the boards of Tyresö FF and Swedish Football Association.

== Honors and awards ==
- Swedish Championship: 1997, 1998, 1999
- Swedish Cup: 1997, 1999
