= Nina Nymark Andersen =

Norwegian footballer (born 1972)

Personal information
- Date of birth: 28 September 1972 (age 54)

Senior career*
Years	Team	Apps	(Gls)
- IL Sandviken
- IF Fløya

International career
1993–	Norway	50	

Managerial career
- IF Fløya
Medal record
Women's football
Representing Norway
Olympic Games
Bronze medal – third place	1996 Atlanta	Team
World Cup
Gold medal – first place	1995 Sweden	Team
- * Club domestic league appearances and goals

Nina Nymark Jakobsen (née Andersen) (born 28 September 1972) is a former Norwegian footballer, world champion and Olympic medalist.

She debuted for the Norwegian national team in 1993, and played 50 matches for the national team. She received a bronze medal at the 1996 Summer Olympics in Atlanta. Her twin sister Anne Nymark Andersen is also a football player, and the two sisters played simultaneously for the national football team. They both became world champions in 1995.

Her clubs include IL Sandviken and IF Fløya.

After retiring as a player, she has spent four years as assistant coach at IF Fløya, leaving the club after the 2005 season. In the 2008 season, Nymark Jacobsen coached the club Fløya, first together with Rune Repvik, and later with coach Rune Brustad.
