= Anna Pohjanen =

Swedish footballer

Personal information
- Full name: Anna Karin Severina Pohjanen
- Date of birth: 25 January 1974 (age 52)
- Place of birth: Umeå, Sweden
- Position: Midfielder

Senior career*
Years	Team	Apps	(Gls)
- Sunnanå SK
1998–2001	Älvsjö AIK		

International career^{‡}
	Sweden	51	(8)
- * Club domestic league appearances and goals as of 6 July 2013 ‡ National team caps and goals as of 6 July 2013

Anna Karin Severina Pohjanen (born 25 January 1974) is a Swedish former football midfielder who played in the Damallsvenskan for Sunnanå SK and Älvsjö AIK. She won 51 caps for the Sweden women's national football team, scoring eight goals, and appeared at the 1995 FIFA Women's World Cup and the 1996 Summer Olympics.

Pohjanen retired from football aged 27 to start a new career as a pop singer. She released her debut album "Better Things To Do" in December 2001, then went on tour in 2002.

She then moved into television punditry and worked for Sveriges Television on their football coverage. Pohjanen also founded a sport management company and is an advisor to several leading women's footballers in Sweden. Sveriges Television removed her from her role as a pundit in 2007, amid concerns of a potential conflict of interest.

== Football career ==
Ahead of the 1998 season, Älvsjö AIK beat competition from other clubs to sign Pohjanen from Sunnanå SK, where she had spent her entire career to that point. In her first season Älvsjö secured their fourth successive Damallsvenskan title, gaining Pohjanen her first winner's medal. She won her second in 1999, when Älvsjö retained their title again.

After the 2000 season, Pohjanen considered retiring from football to concentrate on her music. But she accepted a new contract from Älvsjö which allowed her to miss training for her recording sessions. She stopped playing altogether after 2001.

Pohjanen later worked as an advisor to women's football players and founded a sports management firm with lawyer and former Älvsjö teammate Lotta Fridh. She was careful not to have any involvement in transfers as she was not a FIFA-registered agent.

== Music career ==
Better Things To Do

Studio album by Anna Pohjanen
- Released: 15 December 2001
- Recorded: 2001
- Genre: Pop
- Length: 44:49
- Label: Label This
- Producers: Calle Löfmarck, Olle Skog

Singer-songwriter Pohjanen released debut album "Better Things To Do" in December 2001 on Label This, a subsidiary of Bonnier Amigo Music Group (BAMG). It contained lyrics in English, underpinned by guitar-based soft rock. The album received a mixed critical reception; with Norrköpings Tidningar praising "competent", "worthy" pop in the PJ Harvey mould. Svenska Dagbladet's review was less complementary, suggesting that none of the songs got off the ground. The album failed to chart.

== Personal life ==
In 1999 Pohjanen was in a relationship with professional National Hockey League (NHL) player Mats Lindgren.
