= Ulrika Kalte =

Swedish footballer

Personal information
- Full name: Maria Ulrika Kalte
- Date of birth: 19 May 1970
- Place of birth: Skärholmen, Sweden
- Position: Forward

Youth career
- Norsborgs FF

Senior career*
Years	Team	Apps	(Gls)
1988–1990	Hammarby IF DFF		
- Älvsjö AIK
- Shiroki F.C. Serena
- Sundbybergs IK

International career
1989–1996	Sweden	56	(20)
- * Club domestic league appearances and goals

Maria Ulrika Kalte, born 19 May 1970 in Skärholmen, Sweden is a Swedish former association football player. She played for Älvsjö AIK and the Swedish national team during the 1995 World Cup in Sweden, where Sweden was knocked out in the quarterfinal game. and the 1996 Olympic Tournament in Atlanta, where Sweden ended up 6th.

She began playing for Norsborgs FF, before becoming a professional in Japan. as she moved to Shiroki F.C. Serena after the 1995 World Cup.

== International career ==
In May 1989 Kalte made her national team debut at Wembley Stadium, as Sweden beat England 2–0 in a curtain raiser for the Rous Cup.

Down 0-1 to China in the Quarter-Finals of the 1995 World Cup, Ulrika scored an equalizer in the 3rd minute of second half stoppage time to draw level and keep the hosts alive. Her team kept the match tied through extra time, but were eliminated from the tournament in a penalty kick shootout.
