= Dagmar Pohlmann =

German footballer

Personal information
- Date of birth: 7 February 1972 (age 54)
- Place of birth: Frankfurt, West Germany
- Position: Midfielder

Senior career*
Years	Team	Apps	(Gls)
1996	FSV Frankfurt		

International career
1996	Germany	36 (?)	
- * Club domestic league appearances and goals

Dagmar Pohlmann (born 7 February 1972) is a German retired football midfielder. She was part of the Germany women's national football team and competed at the 1996 Summer Olympics, playing one match. At the club level, she played for FSV Frankfurt.

== See also ==
- Germany at the 1996 Summer Olympics
