= Anne Nymark Andersen =

Norwegian footballer (born 1972)

Personal information
- Date of birth: 28 September 1972 (age 54)
- Position: Defender

Senior career*
Years	Team	Apps	(Gls)
- IL Sandviken
- Bjørnar

International career
	Norway	65	(9)
Medal record
Women's football
Representing Norway
Olympic Games
Bronze medal – third place	1996 Atlanta	Team
World Cup
Gold medal – first place	1995 Sweden	Team
- * Club domestic league appearances and goals

Anne Nymark Andersen (born 28 September 1972), also known as Anne Nymark Rylandsholm, is a Norwegian former footballer, world champion and Olympic medalist. Her twin sister Nina Nymark Andersen is also a football player.

A defender, Andersen played 65 matches and scored 9 goals for the Norway women's national football team. With the Norwegian team, she became European champion in 1993, and world champion in 1995. She won a bronze medal at the 1996 Summer Olympics in Atlanta.

Her clubs include IL Sandviken and Bjørnar.
