= Åsa Jakobsson =

Swedish footballer

Personal information
- Date of birth: 2 June 1966 (age 60)
- Place of birth: Sweden

International career
Years	Team	Apps	(Gls)
	Sweden	56	(1)

Åsa Jakobsson (born 2 June 1966) is a former Swedish football player. She was part of the Sweden women's national football team. She competed at the 1996 Summer Olympics, playing three matches.

== See also ==
- Sweden at the 1996 Summer Olympics
