= Birgitt Austermühl =

German footballer (born 1965)

Personal information
- Date of birth: 8 October 1965 (age 61)
- Place of birth: Kassel, West Germany
- Position: Defender

Senior career*
Years	Team	Apps	(Gls)
1996	FSV Frankfurt		

International career
1991–1996	Germany	55 (?)	
- * Club domestic league appearances and goals

Birgitt Austermühl (also spelled Austermuehl, born 8 October 1965) is a German former football defender. She was part of the Germany women's national football team.

She competed at the 1996 Summer Olympics, playing 3 matches. On club level she played for FSV Frankfurt.

== See also ==
- Germany at the 1996 Summer Olympics
