= Patricia Brocker =

German footballer

Personal information
- Date of birth: 7 April 1966 (age 60)
- Position: Forward

International career
Years	Team	Apps	(Gls)
1992–1996	Germany	46	(31)
Medal record
Bronze medal – third place	Atlanta 1996	{{{2}}}

Patricia Brocker (née Grigoli, born 7 April 1966) is a former German footballer who played as a forward. She competed for the German team at the 1996 Summer Olympics.

== Life ==
Patricia Brocker played as a student for FSV Jägersburg, later for VfR 09 Saarbrücken and TuS Niederkirchen. Her biggest club-level success was the German Championship in 1993. In 1992, she debuted for the Germany women's national football team in a match against Italy. Brocker scored 31 goals in her 46 appearances, her last against Brazil in 1996. She won the European Championship in 1995 and was runner-up at the 1995 Women's World Cup. She also participated with the German team at the 1996 Summer Olympics. In 2001, she returned to her youth club FSV Jägersburg.
