= Manuela Goller =

German footballer

Personal information
- Date of birth: 5 January 1971 (age 55)
- Place of birth: Wipperfürth, Germany
- Position: Goalkeeper

Youth career
- TuS Egen

Senior career*
Years	Team	Apps	(Gls)
	SSG 09 Bergisch Gladbach		(-)
	Grün-Weiß Brauweiler		(-)

International career
1990-1996	Germany	45	(-)
- * Club domestic league appearances and goals

Manuela Goller (born 5 January 1971 in Wipperfürth, North Rhine-Westphalia) is a German former footballer.

== Early life ==
Manuela Goller was born in Wipperfürth to Franz-Josef Goller, a dairy farmer, and joined the local sports club, TuS Egen, which he runs.

== Career ==
Manuela Goller played as a goalkeeper for SSG 09 Bergisch Gladbach and Grün-Weiß Brauweiler. In 1997, playing for Brauweiler, she won the last German championship before the introduction of the national Bundesliga, beating FC Rumeln-Kaldenhausen 5–3 in a penalty shoot-out. In 1994 and 1997, she won the Frauen DFB Pokal. She played her first of 45 matches for Germany in 1990 against England. In 1995, she played in the final of the European Championship in 1995, which Germany won 3–2 against Sweden, and in the final of the World Cup in 1995, which Norway won 2–0. She also played all three games for Germany in the Summer Olympics in 1996. These were her last games for Germany.
