= Gunnlaugsdóttir =

Gunnlaugsdóttir is an Icelandic patronymic. It may refer to:

- Álfrún Gunnlaugsdóttir (born 1938), Icelandic writer
- Áslaug Munda Gunnlaugsdóttir (born 2001), Icelandic footballer
- Ásta B. Gunnlaugsdóttir (born 1961), Icelandic footballer
- Jóhanna Gunnlaugsdóttir, Icelandic professor
- Nanna Margrét Gunnlaugsdóttir (born 1978), Icelandic politician
- Pálína Gunnlaugsdóttir (born 1987), Icelandic basketball player
- Þorbjörg Sigríður Gunnlaugsdóttir (born 1978), Icelandic politician
- Tinna Gunnlaugsdóttir (born 1954), Icelandic actress
