= UEFA Women's Euro 1995 qualifying =

Football tournament qualification stage

The qualification for UEFA Women's Euro 1995 was held between 15 August 1993 and 30 October 1994. The winner of the quarter-finals qualified.

== First round ==
=== Group 1 ===
Team	GP	W	D	L	GF	GA	Pts
Norway	6	5	1	0	33	3	11
Finland	6	2	3	1	8	7	7
Hungary	6	0	3	3	5	18	3
Czech Republic	6	0	3	3	5	23	3

4 September 1993
15:00

Norway	6–1	Czech Republic
Aarønes 3', 60', 76'; Leinan 25'; Hegstad 81'; Sandberg 84'	NFF Report (in Norwegian); FAČR Report (in Czech)	Hekelová 5'

Gvarv Stadion, Gvarv
Attendance: 2,000
Referee: Christer Fällström (Sweden)

26 September 1993

Finland	1–1	Hungary

Finland

16 October 1993

Norway	8–0	Hungary
Leinan 1', 3', 30'; Carlsen 8', 39'; Hegstad 43'; Aarønes 63'; Medalen 90'	NFF Report (in Norwegian)

Varden Amfi, Bergen
Attendance: 2,107
Referee: Eduards Bigats (Latvia)

23 April 1994
10:15

Czech Republic	0–0	Finland
	FAČR Report (in Czech)

Stadion Pod Lipou, Roudnice nad Labem
Attendance: 129
Referee: Dragutin Karlo Poljak (Croatia)

14 May 1994
16:00

Czech Republic	0–0	Hungary
	FAČR Report (in Czech)

Stadion Širuch, Staré Město
Attendance: 590
Referee: Manfred Schüttengruber (Austria)

21 May 1994

Finland	2–2	Norway
Holmberg 56'; Mäkinen 82'	NFF Report (in Norwegian); Hamar Arbeiderblad 24 May 1994, p. 36	Aarønes 52'; Carlsen 80'

ISS Stadion, Vantaa
Attendance: 390
Referee: Sergejus Slyva (Lithuania)

4 June 1994

Hungary	0–4	Norway
	NFF Report (in Norwegian)	Zaborowski 22'; Aarønes 43'; Myklebust 51'; Risse 68'

Hidegkuti Nándor Stadion, Budapest
Attendance: 574
Referee: Lubos

19 June 1994
16:00

Finland	4–0	Czech Republic
?? 16' ?? 33' ?? 48' ?? 79'	FAČR Report (in Czech)

ISS Stadion, Vantaa
Referee: Werner

4 September 1994

Norway	4–0	Finland
Støre 29'; Leinan 48'; Aarønes 60'; Medalen 82'	NFF Report (in Norwegian)

Bislett Stadion, Oslo
Attendance: 550
Referee: Howell

10 September 1994

Hungary	4–4	Czech Republic
Kern 31' 66' 73'; Bajkó 55'	FAČR Report (in Czech) (in Hungarian)	Chlumecká 15', 77'; Šmeralová 40', 60'

Széktói Stadion, Kecskemét
Attendance: 100
Referee: Hans-Peter Dellwing (Germany)

24 September 1994

Czech Republic	0–9	Norway
	NFF Report (in Norwegian); FAČR Report (in Czech); Hamar Arbeiderblad 26 September 1994, p. 30	Sandberg 3', 44', 58', 64'; Šmeralová 4' (o.g.); Aarønes 6'; Medalen 13', 55'; Tangeraas 90'

Strahov Stadium, Prague
Attendance: 420
Referee: Vesselin Bogdanov (Bulgaria)

24 September 1994

Hungary	0–1	Finland

Hungary

=== Group 2 ===
Team	GP	W	D	L	GF	GA	Pts
Russia	6	4	2	0	9	4	10
Romania	6	3	2	1	16	5	8
Ukraine	6	2	1	3	9	12	5
Poland	6	0	1	5	2	15	1

29 August 1993
17:00

Ukraine	0–2	Russia
	RFS Report (in Russian)	Egorova 35'; Svetlitskaya 44'

FFU Training Complex, Kyiv

18 September 1993

Ukraine	2–2	Romania

Ukraine

10 October 1993

Poland	1–3	Ukraine

Poland

16 October 1993
15:00

Romania	2–2	Russia
Apostol 35'; Simion 68'	RFS Report (in Russian)	Savina 5', 17'

Stadionul Poiana, Câmpina

7 November 1993

Poland	0–4	Romania

Poland

15 May 1994
17:00

Russia	0–0	Poland
	RFS Report (in Russian)

Stroitel Stadium, Selyatino

14 June 1994
17:00

Russia	1–0	Romania
Grigorieva 6'	RFS Report (in Russian)

Stroitel Stadium, Selyatino

21 August 1994

Ukraine	3–0	Poland

Ukraine

3 September 1994

Romania	3–0	Poland

Romania

18 September 1994
17:00

Russia	2–1	Ukraine
Grigorieva 41'; Bosikova 86'	RFS Report (in Russian)	Gusakova 42'

Tsentralnyi Stadion, Voronezh

25 September 1994
15:00

Poland	1–2	Russia
Szondermajer 15'	RFS Report (in Russian)	Bosikova 11', 57'

Stadion Amica, Wronki

28 September 1994

Romania	5–0	Ukraine

Romania

=== Group 3 ===
Team	GP	W	D	L	GF	GA	Pts
Denmark	4	4	0	0	32	1	8
Bulgaria	4	1	1	2	3	11	3
Lithuania	4	0	1	3	1	24	1
FR Yugoslavia	0	0	0	0	0	0	0

15 August 1993
20:00

Lithuania	0–11	Denmark
	DBU Report (in Danish); LFF Report (in Lithuanian)	H. Jensen 9', 89'; Rasmussen 17', 67' (pen.); Bagge 21' (pen.); Nissen 48'; Petersen 54'; Eggers Nielsen 70'; M. Jensen 76', 87'; Stelling 84'

S.Dariaus ir S.Girėno Stadium, Kaunas
Attendance: 500
Referee: Sergei Anokhin (Russia)

10 September 1993
20:00

Lithuania	0–1	Bulgaria
	LFF Report (in Lithuanian)	Kovatscheva 10'

S.Dariaus ir S.Girėno Stadium, Kaunas
Referee: Sergey Shmolik (Belarus)

29 September 1993
16:00

Denmark	6–1	Bulgaria
Thychosen 5', 87'; H. Jensen 15', 18'; M. Jensen 37'; Brink 52'	DBU Report (in Danish)	Manova 45'

Hjørring Stadion, Hjørring
Attendance: 612
Referee: Lennart Olufsson (Sweden)

13 October 1993
17:00

Bulgaria	1–1	Lithuania
Manova 19'	LFF Report (in Lithuanian)	Vashtchilko 88'

Hristo Botev Stadium, Blagoevgrad
Referee: Graziano Cesari (Italy)

25 May 1994

Bulgaria	0–4	Denmark
	DBU Report (in Danish)	?? 7' (o.g.); C. Nielsen 30', 77'; A. Larsen 37'

Osogovo Stadium, Kiustendil

15 June 1994
20:00

Denmark	11–0	Lithuania
H. Jensen 3', 6', 26', 44'; B. Madsen 7'; Thychosen 11'; Rasmussen 45', 83'; Kolding 53'; Brink 64'; Petersen 72'	DBU Report (in Danish); LFF Report (in Lithuanian)

Stadium Ikke Angivet, Idestrup
Referee: Jarmo Karhunen (Finland)

Yugoslavia withdrew.

=== Group 4 ===
Team	GP	W	D	L	GF	GA	Pts
Sweden	4	4	0	0	22	0	8
Slovakia	4	2	0	2	4	9	4
Latvia	4	0	0	4	1	18	0

18 August 1993

Sweden	9–0	Latvia
Kalte; Videkull; Lundgren; H. Johansson; P. Larsson; Wällersten	SvFF Report (in Swedish)

Kvarnängens IP, Nynäshamn
Attendance: 660

22 September 1993

Latvia	0–1	Slovakia
	/ SFZ Report (in Slovak)	Jana Hanzelová 23'

Riga, Latvia

13 October 1993

Slovakia	0–2	Sweden
	SvFF Report (in Swedish)	H. Johansson; Andelén

Štadión Pasienky, Bratislava
Attendance: 660

22 May 1994

Latvia	0–5	Sweden
	SvFF Report (in Swedish)	Loven; Kalte; Videkull; Andelén

Ozolnieki Stadion, Ozolnieki
Attendance: 300

15 June 1994

Sweden	6–0	Slovakia
Nessvold; Lundgren; Andelén; S. Johansson; P. Larsson	SvFF Report (in Swedish)

Strömvallen, Gävle
Attendance: 1,665

21 September 1994

Slovakia	3–1	Latvia
Dzurová 14', 62' Miezgová 88'	/ SFZ Report (in Slovak)	Bezmenova 36'

Bratislava Slovakia

=== Group 5 ===
Team	GP	W	D	L	GF	GA	Pts
Germany	6	6	0	0	55	0	12
Croatia	6	3	1	2	8	18	7
Switzerland	6	2	1	3	9	23	5
Wales	6	0	0	6	5	36	0

19 September 1993

Wales	2–3	Switzerland

Wales

24 October 1993

Switzerland	0–5	Germany
	DFB Report (in German)	Brocker 14', 53', 61'; Mohr 43', 72'

Stadion Niedermatten, Wohlen

10 November 1993

Switzerland	1–2	Croatia
??	HNS Report	Drljača 8', 32'

Stadion Schützenwiese, Winterthur

31 March 1994

Germany	12–0	Wales
Mohr 1'; Wiegmann 6', 38', 87'; Meinert 26', 54', 80'; Neid 43', 70'; Voss 57', 67'; Jones 72'	DFB Report (in German)

Schüco Arena, Bielefeld
Attendance: 2,000
Referee: Oleg Timofeyev (Estonia)

2 April 1994

Switzerland	4–2	Wales

Switzerland

5 April 1994

Croatia	3–0	Wales
	HNS Report

Stadion Kranjčevićeva, Zagreb

4 May 1994

Croatia	1–1	Switzerland
Fočić 7'	HNS Report	??

Stadion Kranjčevićeva, Zagreb

5 May 1994

Wales	0–12	Germany
	DFB Report (in German)	Neid 7'; Minnert 16', 31'; Brocker 35', 59', 61', 77'; Meinert 48', 80'; Austermühl 83'; Wiegmann 85'; Voss 87'

Vetch Field, Swansea
Attendance: 500
Referee: Léon Schelings (Belgium)

22 May 1994

Wales	1–2	Croatia
	HNS Report

Deeside Stadium, Deeside

2 June 1994

Croatia	0–7	Germany
	DFB Report (in German); HNS Report	Mohr 32', 72'; Brocker 67', 77', 80'; Meinert 74'; Neid 87'

Stadion Kranjčevićeva, Zagreb
Attendance: 1,000
Referee: Štefan Tivold (Slovenia)

21 September 1994

Germany	8–0	Croatia
Brocker 9', 58', 84'; Voss 20'; Neid 43'; Prinz 80', 90'; Meinert 89'	DFB Report (in German); NHS Report

Floschenstadion, Sindelfingen

25 September 1994

Germany	11–0	Switzerland
Brocker 14', 19', 48'; Mohr 23', 73'; Wiegmann 36'; Voss 43'; Meinert 45', 62'; Tschöke 64'; Neid 76'	DFB Report (in German)

Arena Weingarten, Weingarten

=== Group 6 ===
Team	GP	W	D	L	GF	GA	Pts
Italy	6	4	1	1	15	4	9
France	6	4	1	1	9	3	9
Portugal	6	3	0	3	13	11	6
Scotland	6	0	0	6	3	22	0

16 October 1993
15:00

Italy	4–0	Scotland
Fiorini 17'; Salmaso 30'; Baldelli 33'; Marsiletti 54'	FIGC Report (in Italian)

Stadio Comunale, Senigallia
Referee: Antonio Jesús López Nieto (Spain)

20 November 1993
14:00

Italy	2–0	France
Ciardi 38' (pen.); Marsiletti 79'	Report (in French); FIGC Report (in Italian)

Stadio San Vito, Cosenza
Attendance: 5,000
Referee: Alain Hamer (Luxembourg)

11 December 1993
16:00

Portugal	0–1	France
	Report (in French); FPF Report (in Portuguese)	Gout 48'

Estádio de São Luís, Faro
Referee: Lawrence Sammut (Malta)

26 February 1994

France	1–0	Scotland
Mugneret-Béghé 24'	Report (in French)

Stade des Trois Sapins, Ozoir-la-Ferrière
Referee: Marek Kowalczyk (Poland)

5 March 1994
16:00

Portugal	1–3	Italy
Bé 78'	FPF Report (in Portuguese); FIGC Report (in Italian)	Costanzo 33'; Morace 35', 41'

Estádio do Bolhão, Fiães
Referee: Roelof Luinge (Netherlands)

26 March 1994
20:00

France	3–0	Portugal
Sykora 19', 88'; Richoux 56'	Report (in French); FPF Report (in Portuguese)

Stade Lebon, Angoulême
Attendance: 1,988
Referee: Bujar Pregja (Albania)

3 April 1994

Scotland	0–4	Italy
	FIGC Report (in Italian)	Costanzo 33', 53'; Fiorini 43'; Morace 83'

Forthbank Stadium, Stirling

24 April 1994
14:00

Scotland	1–2	Portugal
Brown 52'	FPF Report (in Portuguese)	Anabela 47'; Adilia 68'

Forthbank Stadium, Stirling
Referee: Fernand Meese (Belgium)

14 May 1994
16:00

France	1–1	Italy
Sykora 22'	Report (in French); FIGC Report (in Italian)	Carta 88'

Stade de l'Aar, Schiltigheim
Attendance: 824
Referee: John Ashman (Wales)

29 May 1994
19:00

Portugal	8–2	Scotland
Anabela 16', 57', 66'; Bé 25'; Carla Couto 28', 71'; Paula Freitas 32'; Patricia Sequeira 55'	FPF Report (in Portuguese)	Winchester 12'; Mitchell 68'

Estádio Dr. Manuel de Mello, Barreiro
Referee: Celino Gracia Redondo (Spain)

11 June 1994
16:15

Italy	1–2	Portugal
Ulivi 25'	FPF Report (in Portuguese); FIGC Report (in Italian)	Carla Couto 16'; Tesse 71' (o.g.)

Stadio Dei Marmi, Carrara
Referee: Anastasios Papaionannou (Cyprus)

25 September 1994
15:00

Scotland	0–3	France
	Report (in French)	Guitti 48'; Guillemin 49'; Pichon 86'

Allan Park, Aberdeen
Attendance: 480
Referee: Johannes Reijgwart (Netherlands)

=== Group 7 ===
Team	GP	W	D	L	GF	GA	Pts
England	6	4	2	0	29	0	10
Spain	6	3	3	0	29	0	9
Belgium	6	2	1	3	15	13	5
Slovenia	6	0	0	6	0	60	0

25 September 1993

Slovenia	0–10	England

Slovenia

6 October 1993
15:00

Belgium	7–0	Slovenia
Maus 8'; Vanslembrouck 18', 43', 77'; Yde 31'; Demeester 44'; Vanstraelen 84'	KBVB Report (in Dutch)

Soevereinstadion, Lommel
Referee: Gilles Veissière (France)

30 October 1993
14:30

Belgium	0–0	Spain
	KBVB Report (in Dutch)

Heysel Stadion, Brussels
Referee: Hermann Albrecht (Germany)

6 November 1993
14:30

Belgium	0–3	England
	KBVB Report (in Dutch)	Walker 26', 87'; Taylor 83'

Henri Houtsaegerstadion, Koksijde
Referee: Tore Hollung (Norway)

19 December 1993

Spain	0–0	England

Osuna

20 February 1994

England	0–0	Spain

Bradford

13 March 1994
13:00

England	6–0	Belgium
	KBVB Report (in Dutch)

City Ground, Nottingham
Referee: Terje Hauge (Norway)

20 March 1994

Spain	17–0	Slovenia
Prieto x7 González x3 Bakerox2; García x2 R. Castillo x2 Gojkoviv (o.g.)	report

Spain

17 April 1994

England	10–0	Slovenia

England

24 April 1994
12:00

Spain	4–0	Belgium
Pascual; Bakero; Deudorede (o.g.)	KBVB Report (in Dutch); Report

Estadio Municipal, Tortosa
Referee: Daniel Roduit (Switzerland)

14 May 1994
17:00

Slovenia	0–8	Belgium
	KBVB Report (in Dutch)	Maus 7', 38'; Vanstraelen 10'; Van Laethem 12', 47'; Dermul 30'; Kimpe 58', 66'

Ljubljana Stadium, Ljubljana
Referee: Mateo Beušan (Croatia)

29 May 1994

Slovenia	0–8	Spain
		Sirgo 12', 48'; Prieto 28', 32'; Bakero 41', 61'; Pascual 58', 67'

Slovenia

=== Group 8 ===
Team	GP	W	D	L	GF	GA	Pts
Iceland	4	4	0	0	12	2	8
Netherlands	4	2	0	2	7	3	4
Greece	4	0	0	4	1	15	0

26 September 1993

Iceland	2–1	Netherlands
Sæmundsdóttir 11'; Gunnlaugsdóttir 86'	KNVB Report (in Dutch); KSÍ Report (in Icelandic)	Leemans 46'

Laugardalsvöllur, Reykjavík
Referee: Alain Hamer (Luxembourg)

19 March 1994

Netherlands	2–0	Greece
Keereweer 42'; Roos 75'	KNVB Report (in Dutch)

Fortuna Wormerveer, Wormerveer
Attendance: 1,800
Referee: Dermot Gallagher (Republic of Ireland)

16 April 1994

Greece	0–4	Netherlands
	KNVB Report (in Dutch)	van Dam 1', 2'; Limbeek 46'; Noom 47'

Xanthi Ground, Xanthi

29 May 1994

Iceland	3–0	Greece
Gunnlaugsdóttir 49'; Ólafsdóttir 56'; Kristjánsdóttir 77'	KSÍ Report (in Icelandic)

Valsvöllur, Reykjavík
Attendance: 116

24 September 1994

Netherlands	0–1	Iceland
	KNVB Report (in Dutch); KSÍ Report (in Icelandic)	Færseth 60'

Sportpark De Vaan, Rotterdam
Attendance: 1,300
Referee: Svend Erik Christensen (Denmark)

28 September 1994

Greece	1–6	Iceland
??	KSÍ Report (in Icelandic)	Helgadóttir 17', 25', 66', 71'; Sæmundsdóttir 49'; Færseth 80'

Katerini Stadium, Katerini

== Second round ==
=== First leg ===
8 October 1994

Iceland	1–2	England
Ólafsdóttir 31'	KSÍ Report (in Icelandic); Report	Coultard 5'; Davis 61'

Laugardalsvöllur, Reykjavík
Attendance: 600
Referee: Timo Keltanen (Finland)

9 October 1994
12:00

Russia	0–1	Germany
	DFB Report (in German); RFS Report (in Russian); Report	Mohr 70' (pen.)

Stroitel Stadium, Selyatino
Attendance: 1,200
Referee: Luben Angelov (Bulgaria)

15 October 1994
15:00

Denmark	2–0	Sweden
Eggers Nielsen 84'; Krogh 87'	DBU Report (in Danish); SvFF Report (in Swedish); Report

Hjørring Stadion, Hjørring
Attendance: 770
Referee: Fernand Meese (Belgium)

15 October 1994

Italy	1–3	Norway
Salmaso 14'	NFF Report (in Norwegian); FIGC Report (in Italian); Report	Medalen 10'; A. Nymark Andersen 28'; Sandberg 85'

Stadio Danilo Martelli, Mantua
Attendance: 3,050
Referee: Mateo Beusan (Croatia)

=== Second leg ===
27 October 1994
16:00

Germany	4–0	Russia
Mohr 5', 45'; Brocker 23'; Neid 29'	DFB Report (in German); RFS Report (in Russian); Report

Stadion an der Bremer Brücke, Osnabrück
Attendance: 4,600
Referee: Gheorge Constantin (Romania)

Germany won 5–0 on aggregate.

29 October 1994

Norway	4–2	Italy
Sandberg 1'; A. Nymark Andersen 30', 62'; Pettersen 84'	NFF Report (in Norwegian); FIGC Report (in Italian); Report	Morace 34'; Guarino 87'

Bislett Stadion, Oslo
Attendance: 4,122
Referee: Herbert Barr (Northern Ireland)

Norway won 7–3 on aggregate.

29 October 1994
13:00

Sweden	3–0	Denmark
Andelén 7', 45'; H. Johansson 32'	DBU Report (in Danish); SvFF Report (in Swedish); Report

Malmö Stadion, Malmö
Attendance: 958
Referee: István Vad Sr. (Hungary)

Sweden won 3–2 on aggregate.

30 October 1994

England	2–1	Iceland
Coultard 13'; Spacey 65'	KSÍ Report (in Icelandic); Report	Gunnlaugsdóttir 36'

Goldstone Ground, Brighton
Attendance: 2,000
Referee: Richard O'hanlon (Ireland)

England won 4–2 on aggregate.

Germany, Norway, Sweden and England qualified for the final tournament.
Germany, Norway, England, and Denmark qualified for the 1995 FIFA Women's World Cup. (Sweden qualified as hosts.)
