= Bé (footballer) =

Portuguese footballer

Personal information
- Full name: Anabela Fernanda Pinto Silva
- Date of birth: 26 December 1970 (age 55)
- Position: Defender

International career^{‡}
Years	Team	Apps	(Gls)
1993–2002	Portugal	78	(5)
- ‡ National team caps and goals as of 19 May 2002

Anabela Fernanda Pinto Silva (born 26 December 1970), known as Bé, is a Portuguese former footballer who played as a defender. She has been a member of the Portugal women's national team.

== International goals ==
Scores and results list Portugal's goal tally first

Date	Venue	Opponent	Score	Result	Competition	Ref.
5 March 1994	Estádio do Bolhão, Fiães, Portugal	Italy	1–3	1–3	UEFA Women's Euro 1995 qualifying	
29 May 1994	Estádio Dr. Manuel de Mello, Barreiro, Portugal	Scotland	2–1	8–2	UEFA Women's Euro 1995 qualifying	
19 May 2002	Sportpark Molenbroek, Gemert, Netherlands	Netherlands	1–1	1–4	2003 FIFA Women's World Cup qualification (UEFA)	
