= Sweden at the FIFA Women's World Cup =

The Sweden women's national football team has represented Sweden at the FIFA Women's World Cup on nine occasions in 1991, 1995, 1999, 2003, 2007, 2011, 2015, 2019 and 2023. There were runners up once and four times bronze medalists: in 1991, in 2011, in 2019 and in 2023.

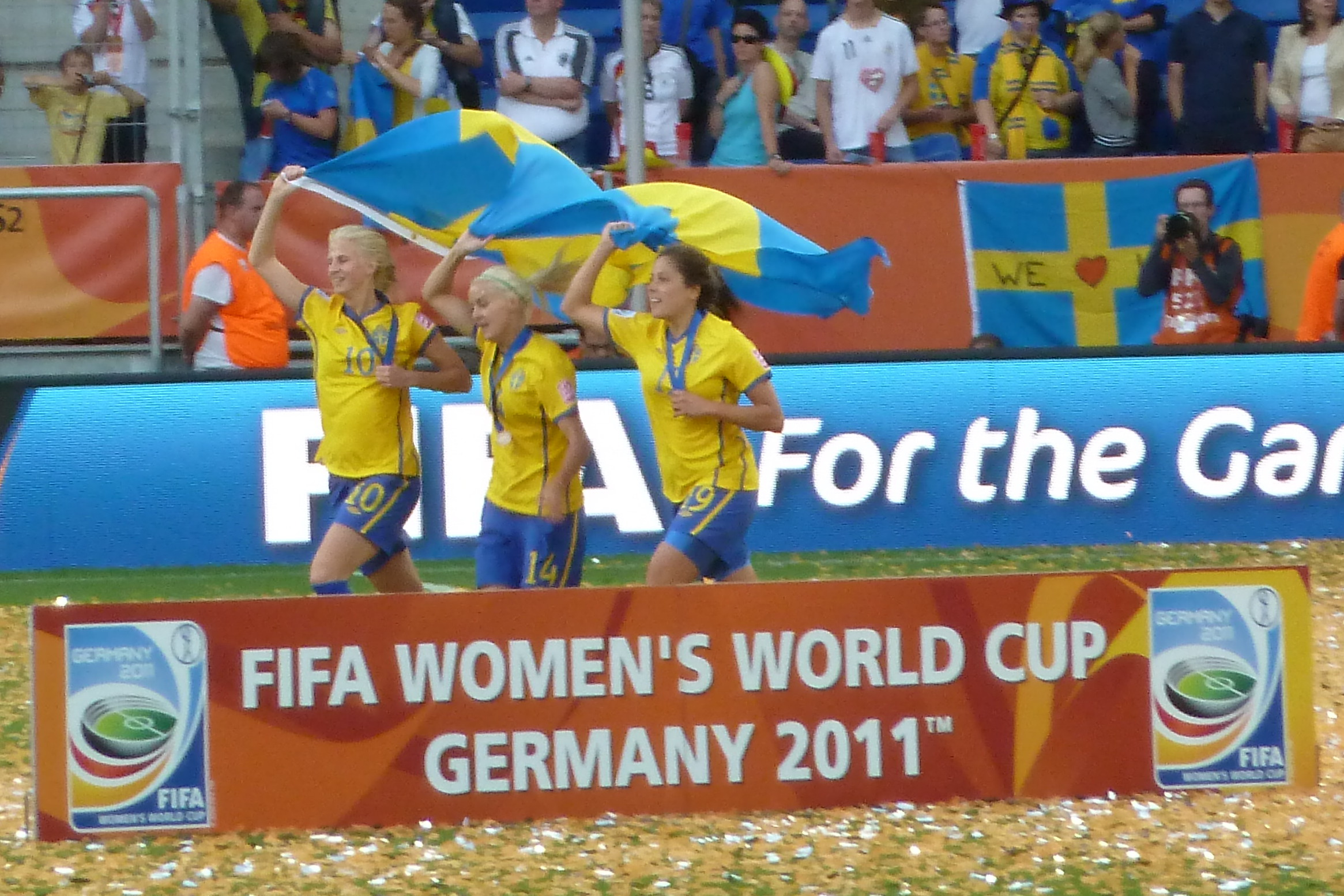
Sofia Jakobsson, Josefine Öqvist and Madelaine Edlund after winning the match for third place

== 1991 World Cup ==
For the World Cup women qualified for the European Championship 1991. But they had prevailed first in the group stage with four wins against France and Poland. In the quarter-final against Italy they reached in the home game only a 1-1. However, due to the 0–0 draw in the second leg, Italy were qualified for the European Championship finals by the away goals rule. As the other teams eliminated in the quarter-finals did not win and everyone lost at least one, Sweden was the fifth European team to qualify for the World Cup.

In the People's Republic of China, Sweden also qualified alongside Brazil, United States and Japan. On November 17, 1991, Sweden played in Panyu District their first World Cup match and lost to the US with 2: 3. It Lena Videkull scored the first World Cup goal for the Swedes with the 1: 3.

In the second game then followed a 8–0 against Japan, with Videkull after 30 seconds, the 1-0 and thus the fastest goal in a women's World Cup succeeded. With a 2–0 win over Brazil in their last group game, Sweden became second in the group and scored in the quarter-finals on the team of hosts and China. Already in the 3rd minute Pia Sundhage managed the 1: 0, where it remained until the end. In the semifinals then Norway was the opponent. Although Sweden were back early, this time in the sixth minute of the lead in the lead, but had to accept just before the half-time break the compensation by a converted penalty and pay tribute in the second half of the superiority of the Norwegians, who moved through three more goals in the final. In the match for third place was then for the first time European champion Germany the opponent and with the 4: 0 the Swedes secured third place.

=== Group B ===
| Pos | Team | Pld | W | D | L | GF | GA | GD | Pts | Qualification |
|---|---|---|---|---|---|---|---|---|---|---|
| 1 | United States | 3 | 3 | 0 | 0 | 11 | 2 | +9 | 6 | Advance to knockout stage |
| 2 | Sweden | 3 | 2 | 0 | 1 | 12 | 3 | +9 | 4 | Advance to knockout stage |
| 3 | Brazil | 3 | 1 | 0 | 2 | 1 | 7 | −6 | 2 | |
| 4 | Japan | 3 | 0 | 0 | 3 | 0 | 12 | −12 | 0 | |

Source: FIFA
17 November 1991
19:45

| Sweden | 2–3 | United States |
|---|---|---|
| Videkull 65'; I. Johansson 71' | Report | Jennings 40', 49'; Hamm 62' |

Ying Tung Stadium, Guangzhou
Attendance: 14,000
Referee: John Toro Rendón (Colombia)

19 November 1991
19:45

| Japan | 0–8 | Sweden |
|---|---|---|
| | Report | Videkull 1', 11'; Andelén 15', 60'; Lundgren 25'; Nilsson 27'; Sundhage 34'; Yamaguchi 70' (o.g.) |

New Plaza Stadium, Foshan
Attendance: 14,000
Referee: Raja Shrestha Gyanu (Nepal)

21 November 1991
15:30

| Brazil | 0–2 | Sweden |
|---|---|---|
| | Report | Sundhage 42' (pen.); Hedberg 56' |

Ying Tung Stadium, Guangzhou
Attendance: 12,000
Referee: Lu Jun (China PR)

=== Quarter-finals ===
24 November 1991
19:45

| China | 0–1 | Sweden |
|---|---|---|
| | Report | Sundhage 3' |

Tianhe Stadium, Guangzhou
Attendance: 55,000
Referee: John Toro Rendón (Colombia)

=== Semi-finals ===
27 November 1991
15:30

| Sweden | 1–4 | Norway |
|---|---|---|
| Videkull 6' | Report | Svensson 39' (pen.); Medalen 41', 77'; Carlsen 67' |

Ying Tung Stadium, Guangzhou
Attendance: 16,000
Referee: Jim McCluskey (Scotland)

=== Third place play-off ===
29 November 1991
19:45

| Sweden | 4–0 | Germany |
|---|---|---|
| Andelén 7'; Sundhage 11'; Videkull 29'; Nilsson 43' | Report |

Guangdong Provincial Stadium, Guangzhou
Attendance: 20,000
Referee: Cláudia Vasconcelos (Brazil)

== 1995 World Cup ==
Four years later, the Swedes did not have to qualify as World Cup hosts, making Sweden the first country to host both the men's (1958) and women's World Cups. Nevertheless, they participated in the Qualification as it also served as a qualification for the Euro 1995. With four wins against the Slovakia and Latvia, they made it into the quarter-finals. Denmark was defeated 3–0 in the home game after a 2–0 away defeat. So they would have been athletically qualified for the World Cup. In the semi-final, they lost the away game against Norway with 3: 4, but won the home game with 4: 1. In the final in Germany against the defending champion they lost with 2: 3.

At the World Cup in their own country, Tomas Brolin and Kristin Bengtsson (Player of the Year and Player of the Year 1994 in Sweden) earned them four years previously Brazil and Japan zugelost, also EM Final opponents Germany. After a 1–0 defeat against Brazil, they were able to retaliate with 3: 2 against Germany for the European Championship final defeat. With a 2: 0 against Japan, they were tied with Germany group second, as they had the worse goal difference. In the quarter-final against China, they fell in the 29th Minute 0–1 in arrears and it remained until the 90th Minute. In the third minute of added time, Ulrika Kalte still managed to equalize. Since no team could score a goal in the subsequent extra time, there was the first penalty shootout at a women's World Cup. Here, the Chinese had the slightly better goal scorers and came through a 4: 3 in the semifinals. China then lost in the semi-final against Germany and also the small final against the USA. The Swedes, who were awarded the Fair Play Prize, had to watch their neighbor Norway win the final against Germany and become the first European team to win Women's World Cup. However, after qualifying for the quarter-finals, Sweden qualified for the women's first football tournament at the Olympic Games, in which only the eight best teams from the World Cup could participate. Weil, however England was the seventh best team in the Olympic Games not eligible to start, Brazil could participate as the ninth best team also.

=== Group A ===
| Pos | Team | Pld | W | D | L | GF | GA | GD | Pts | Qualification |
|---|---|---|---|---|---|---|---|---|---|---|
| 1 | Germany | 3 | 2 | 0 | 1 | 9 | 4 | +5 | 6 | Advance to knockout stage |
| 2 | Sweden (H) | 3 | 2 | 0 | 1 | 5 | 3 | +2 | 6 | Advance to knockout stage |
| 3 | Japan | 3 | 1 | 0 | 2 | 2 | 4 | −2 | 3 | Advance to knockout stage |
| 4 | Brazil | 3 | 1 | 0 | 2 | 3 | 8 | −5 | 3 | |

Source: FIFA
(H) Hosts
5 June 1995
18:00

| Sweden | 0–1 | Brazil |
|---|---|---|
| | Report | Roseli 37' |

Olympia, Helsingborg
Attendance: 14,500
Referee: Sonia Denoncourt (Canada)

7 June 1995
19:00

| Sweden | 3–2 | Germany |
|---|---|---|
| Andersson 65' (pen.), 86'; Sundhage 80' | Report | Wiegmann 9' (pen.); Lohn 42' |

Olympia, Helsingborg
Attendance: 5,855
Referee: Linda May Black (New Zealand)

9 June 1995
19:00

| Sweden | 2–0 | Japan |
|---|---|---|
| Videkull 66'; Andelén 88' | Report |

Arosvallen, Västerås
Attendance: 7,811
Referee: Petros Mathabela (South Africa)

=== Quarter-finals ===
13 June 1995
20:15

| Sweden | 1–1 (a.e.t.) | China |
|---|---|---|
| Kalte 90+3' | Report | Sun Qingmei 29' |
Penalties
| Andersson (penalty missed); Videkull (penalty scored); Pohjanen (penalty scored); Sundhage (penalty scored); Nessvold (penalty missed) | 3–4 | (penalty scored) Sun Wen; (penalty scored) Xie Huilin; (penalty scored) Chen Yufeng; (penalty scored) Shui Qingxia; (penalty missed) Liu Ailing |

Olympia, Helsingborg
Attendance: 7,537
Referee: Sonia Denoncourt (Canada)

== 1999 World Cup ==
For the third World Cup, UEFA then set up separate qualifiers for the first time and to date the only continental association. In the Qualification Sweden met Ukraine, Iceland and Spain. With six wins in six games Sweden took first place with nine points ahead of Ukraine and qualified directly for the World Cup. Ukraine then lost in the play-offs of the runners-up against Germany, which thus also qualified.

In the US, the Swedes lost the opening match against China with 1: 2, with a 3–1 draw against Australia and a 2: 0 against World Cup newcomer Ghana but was still ranked second. In the quarterfinals they met the neighbors and defending champion Norway. After a scoreless first half, they lost 1: 3, which the World Cup was back in the quarterfinals. However, Sweden was qualified for the Women's Football Tournament at the Olympic Games 2000, which is hosted by only the seven best teams from the World Cup in addition to the hosts Australia could.

=== Group D ===
| Pos | Team | Pld | W | D | L | GF | GA | GD | Pts | Qualification |
|---|---|---|---|---|---|---|---|---|---|---|
| 1 | China | 3 | 3 | 0 | 0 | 12 | 2 | +10 | 9 | Advance to knockout stage |
| 2 | Sweden | 3 | 2 | 0 | 1 | 6 | 3 | +3 | 6 | Advance to knockout stage |
| 3 | Australia | 3 | 0 | 1 | 2 | 3 | 7 | −4 | 1 | |
| 4 | Ghana | 3 | 0 | 1 | 2 | 1 | 10 | −9 | 1 | |

Source: FIFA
June 19, 1999
17:00 PDT (UTC−7)

| China | 2–1 | Sweden |
|---|---|---|
| Jin Yan 17'; Liu Ailing 69' | Report | Bengtsson 2' |

Spartan Stadium, San Jose
Attendance: 23,298
Referee: Virginia Tovar (Mexico)

June 23, 1999
20:30 EDT (UTC−4)

| Australia | 1–3 | Sweden |
|---|---|---|
| Murray 32' | Report | Törnqvist 8'; Ljungberg 21', 69' |

Jack Kent Cooke Stadium, Landover
Attendance: 16,448
Referee: Fatou Gaye (Senegal)

June 26, 1999
16:00 CDT (UTC−5)

| Ghana | 0–2 | Sweden |
|---|---|---|
| | Report | Svensson 58', 86' |

Soldier Field, Chicago
Attendance: 34,256
Referee: Sonia Denoncourt (Canada)

=== Quarter-finals ===
June 30, 1999
19:30 PDT (UTC−7)

| Norway | 3–1 | Sweden |
|---|---|---|
| Aarønes 51'; Pettersen 58'; Riise 72' (pen.) | Report | Moström 90+1' |

Spartan Stadium, San Jose
Attendance: 21,411
Referee: Im Eun-ju (South Korea)

== 2003 World Cup ==
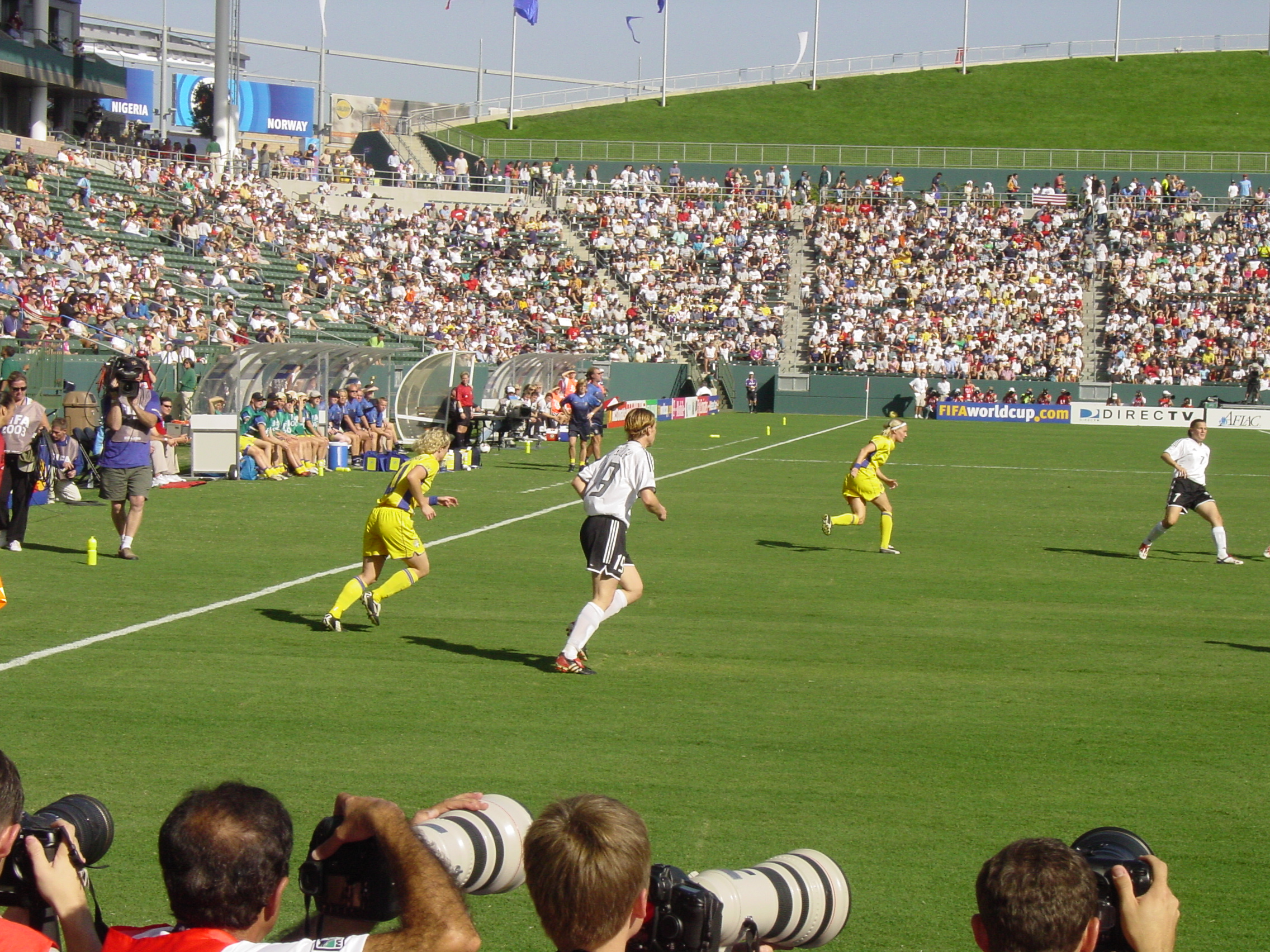
Scene from the Final against Germany

Actually, the 2003 World Cup should take place again in People's Republic of China. Due to the SARS epidemic, the tournament was temporarily relocated to the United States. Thus the World Cup took place for the second time in the US. In the Qualification, Sweden met Denmark, Switzerland and neighbors Finland. With five wins and one defeat Sweden qualified as group winners for the World Cup. The second placed and tied Danes did not manage to qualify for the World Cup in the playoffs of the runners-up. After a 0–2 in France that was 1–1 in the home game too little.

In the US, they met in the first group match on the host USA and lost with 1: 3. Against North Korea then followed a 1–0 win and a 3–0 victory over Nigeria reached the quarter-finals as second in the group. Here Brazil was the opponent and after a 2-1 the semi-final was reached. In this they also won against Canada 2-1 and reached the final for the first time. Here Germany was the opponent who had turned off the host and defending champion in the semifinals. After the first 40 minutes were scoreless Hanna Ljungberg scored in the 42nd minute 1-0 for the Swedes, which it went to the break. Immediately after a push back to the second half, Maren Meinert equalized. It remained until the end of regular time, so that there was an extension as four years earlier. In this Nia Kuenzer the only Golden goal in a women's World Cup game with which the German women for the first time world champion and Germany became the first world champion in men and women. For Sweden, second place is still the best finish to date and Sweden was also qualified for the Women's Football Tournament at the Olympic Games 2004, which hosted Greece only the two best European teams of the World Cup could participate.

=== Group A ===
| Pos | Team | Pld | W | D | L | GF | GA | GD | Pts | Qualification |
|---|---|---|---|---|---|---|---|---|---|---|
| 1 | United States (H) | 3 | 3 | 0 | 0 | 11 | 1 | +10 | 9 | Advance to knockout stage |
| 2 | Sweden | 3 | 2 | 0 | 1 | 5 | 3 | +2 | 6 | Advance to knockout stage |
| 3 | North Korea | 3 | 1 | 0 | 2 | 3 | 4 | −1 | 3 | |
| 4 | Nigeria | 3 | 0 | 0 | 3 | 0 | 11 | −11 | 0 | |

Source: FIFA
(H) Hosts
September 21, 2003
12:30 EDT (UTC−4)

| United States | 3–1 | Sweden |
|---|---|---|
| Lilly 27'; Parlow 36'; Boxx 78' | Report | Svensson 58' |

Robert F. Kennedy Memorial Stadium, Washington, D.C.
Attendance: 34,144
Referee: Zhang Dongqing (China PR)

September 25, 2003
16:45 EDT (UTC−4)

| Sweden | 1–0 | North Korea |
|---|---|---|
| Svensson 7' | Report |

Lincoln Financial Field, Philadelphia
Attendance: 31,553
Referee: Tammy Ogston (Australia)

September 28, 2003
13:00 EDT (UTC−4)

| Sweden | 3–0 | Nigeria |
|---|---|---|
| Ljungberg 56', 79'; Moström 81' | Report |

Columbus Crew Stadium, Columbus
Attendance: 22,828
Referee: Sonia Denoncourt (Canada)

=== Quarter-finals ===
October 1, 2003
16:30 EDT (UTC−4)

| Brazil | 1–2 | Sweden |
|---|---|---|
| Marta 44' (pen.) | Report | Svensson 23'; Andersson 53' |

Gillette Stadium, Foxborough
Attendance: 25,103
Referee: Zhang Dongqing (China PR)

=== Semi-finals ===
October 5, 2003
19:30 PDT (UTC−7)

| Sweden | 2–1 | Canada |
|---|---|---|
| Moström 79'; Öqvist 86' | Report | Lang 64' |

PGE Park, Portland
Attendance: 27,623
Referee: Katriina Elovirta (Finland)

=== Final ===
October 12, 2003
10:00 am PDT (UTC−7)

| Germany | 2–1 (a.e.t./g.g.) | Sweden |
|---|---|---|
| Meinert 46'; Künzer 98' | Report | Ljungberg 41' |

Home Depot Center, Carson
Attendance: 26,137
Referee: Cristina Ionescu (Romania)

== 2007 World Cup ==
At the finals, they met USA, Nigeria and North Korea. In the opening match against Nigeria, it was enough only to a 1-1. In the second game against the US, they lost 0–2. So they had to win in the last game against North Korea with three goals difference to reach the quarter-finals. But it only succeeded in a 2–1 victory with Sweden first time in the preliminary round eliminated. In the preliminaries, Sweden also failed to qualify for the women's football tournament at the 2008 Olympic Games, which was only attended by the three best European teams from the World Cup. As England was not allowed to start as the third best European team, Sweden and Denmark were allowed to play for this place. Sweden prevailed with 4: 2 and 3: 1 and then could participate.

=== Group B ===
| Pos | Team | Pld | W | D | L | GF | GA | GD | Pts | Qualification |
|---|---|---|---|---|---|---|---|---|---|---|
| 1 | United States | 3 | 2 | 1 | 0 | 5 | 2 | +3 | 7 | Advance to knockout stage |
| 2 | North Korea | 3 | 1 | 1 | 1 | 5 | 4 | +1 | 4 | Advance to knockout stage |
| 3 | Sweden | 3 | 1 | 1 | 1 | 3 | 4 | −1 | 4 | |
| 4 | Nigeria | 3 | 0 | 1 | 2 | 1 | 4 | −3 | 1 | |

Source: FIFA

The four teams were also paired in the same group in 2003.

11 September 2007
20:00

| Nigeria | 1–1 | Sweden |
|---|---|---|
| Uwak 82' | Report | Svensson 50' |

Chengdu Sports Centre Stadium, Chengdu
Attendance: 35,100
Referee: Niu Huijun (China PR)

14 September 2007
17:00

| Sweden | 0–2 | United States |
|---|---|---|
| | Report | Wambach 34' (pen.), 58' |

Chengdu Sports Centre Stadium, Chengdu
Attendance: 35,600
Referee: Gyöngyi Gaál (Hungary)

18 September 2007
20:00

| North Korea | 1–2 | Sweden |
|---|---|---|
| Ri Un-suk 22' | Report | Schelin 4', 54' |

Tianjin Olympic Center Stadium, Tianjin
Attendance: 33,196
Referee: Christine Beck (Germany)

== 2011 World Cup ==
For the World Cup in Germany 2011 FIFA Women's World Cup qualification, the Swedes with seven wins and a draw against the Czech Republic, Belgium, Wales and Azerbaijan. The Swedes scored with 17: 0 against Azerbaijan their highest international victory. With the 1–0 victory in the Czech Republic on the penultimate round Sweden secured the ticket for the play-off round of the group winners, this time was necessary. The first leg against Denmark was won 2: 1, as it was 1: 2 in the second leg after 90 minutes. In this secured Charlotte Rohlin, who had already scored the 1: 2-goal, with the goal to 2: 2 the World Cup ticket.

In Germany Sweden was dissolved into a group with the US and North Korea, as it had been four years earlier. A new addition was Colombia, which had qualified for the World Cup for the first time and Sweden beat the opening 1–0 win. After another 1: 0 against North Korea, the Swedes and the Americans were already qualified for the quarter-finals. In the direct comparison, it was only about who was group winner and thus vice-world champion Brazil went out of the way. The Swedes were able to win a World Cup match against the US for the first time with a score of 2: 1 in the quarter-finals Australia, which surprisingly eliminated Norway. With 3: 1, the Swedes prevailed against the Asian champions and reached the semi-finals. Here they met the surprise team Japan, which had eliminated hosts and two-times defending champions Germany in the quarterfinals. Sweden took the lead in the 10th minute through Josefine Öqvist, but had to accept the equalizer eight minutes later. It remained until the half-time break. In the second half, the Japanese could then shoot two more goals, while the attack efforts of the Swedes were unsuccessful. Japan was thus the first time in the final and was by a victory against the US in the penalty shootout as the first Asian team football world champion. Sweden won the small final against France the day before with a remarkable goal by Marie Hammarström even though she lost 22 minutes to Öqvist after Red Card. With the semi-final draw Sweden could also qualify for the Women's Football Tournament at the Olympic Games, in which only the two best European teams of the World Cup and United Kingdom could participate as hosts.

=== Group C ===
| Pos | Team | Pld | W | D | L | GF | GA | GD | Pts | Qualification |
|---|---|---|---|---|---|---|---|---|---|---|
| 1 | Sweden | 3 | 3 | 0 | 0 | 4 | 1 | +3 | 9 | Advance to knockout stage |
| 2 | United States | 3 | 2 | 0 | 1 | 6 | 2 | +4 | 6 | Advance to knockout stage |
| 3 | North Korea | 3 | 0 | 1 | 2 | 0 | 3 | −3 | 1 | |
| 4 | Colombia | 3 | 0 | 1 | 2 | 0 | 4 | −4 | 1 | |

Source: FIFA
28 June 2011
15:00

| Colombia | 0–1 | Sweden |
|---|---|---|
| | Report | Landström 57' |

BayArena, Leverkusen
Attendance: 21,106
Referee: Carol Anne Chenard (Canada)

2 July 2011
14:00

| North Korea | 0–1 | Sweden |
|---|---|---|
| | Report | Dahlkvist 64' |

Impuls Arena, Augsburg
Attendance: 23,768
Referee: Estela Álvarez (Argentina)

6 July 2011
20:45

| Sweden | 2–1 | United States |
|---|---|---|
| Dahlkvist 16' (pen.); LePeilbet 35' (o.g.) | Report | Wambach 67' |

Volkswagen Arena, Wolfsburg
Attendance: 23,468
Referee: Etsuko Fukano (Japan)

=== Quarter-finals ===
10 July 2011
13:00

| Sweden | 3–1 | Australia |
|---|---|---|
| Sjögran 11'; Dahlkvist 16'; Schelin 52' | Report | Perry 40' |

Impuls Arena, Augsburg
Attendance: 24,605
Referee: Silvia Reyes (Peru)

=== Semi-finals ===
13 July 2011
20:45

| Japan | 3–1 | Sweden |
|---|---|---|
| Kawasumi 19', 64'; Sawa 60' | Report | Öqvist 10' |

Waldstadion, Frankfurt
Attendance: 45,434
Referee: Carol Anne Chenard (Canada)

=== Third place play-off ===
16 July 2011
17:30

| Sweden | 2–1 | France |
|---|---|---|
| Schelin 29'; M. Hammarström 82' | Report | Thomis 56' |

Rhein-Neckar-Arena, Sinsheim
Attendance: 25,475
Referee: Kari Seitz (United States)

== 2015 World Cup ==
In the Qualification the Swedes prevail again. In the group were Scotland, Poland, Bosnia-Herzegovina, Northern Ireland and for the first time the Faroe Islands the opponents. After nine wins, Sweden and Scotland had at least reached the playoff games of the best runners-up. On the last day of the match, the Swedes won 2–0 against the Scottish side and were thus the last of the seven group winners to qualify directly for the World Cup finals. The Scots failed in the playoffs to the Netherlands, who qualified for the World Cup for the first time.

In the draw for the groups, the Swedes were not placed and were "tied" to Group D with USA, against whom they had to play four times in the preliminary round. Further group opponents are Australia and Nigeria. The group was considered the most balanced of the World Cup; it was the only one with four teams that at least reached the semi-finals in their last continental championship fights.

Sweden took the lead in their first game against Nigeria with two goals, twice exploiting the inexperience of Africans in corners. Nigeria could still turn the game and in the end, the Swedes had to be satisfied with the 3: 3. After a 0–0 draw against the US in the fifth meeting at a World Cup and a 1–1 draw against Australia, the Swedes reached as fourth-best group third in the second round. Here they lost with 1: 4 against Germany and retired. This meant that Sweden, the only European team to have participated in all past Olympic women's football tournaments, had also missed the direct qualification for the women's football tournament at the Olympic Games, but still had the chance to win the third European Olympic ticket in playoffs against the three other European knockout round losers. This was achieved in March 2016 when they were group first in the same playoff.

=== Group D ===
| Pos | Team | Pld | W | D | L | GF | GA | GD | Pts | Qualification |
|---|---|---|---|---|---|---|---|---|---|---|
| 1 | United States | 3 | 2 | 1 | 0 | 4 | 1 | +3 | 7 | Advance to knockout stage |
| 2 | Australia | 3 | 1 | 1 | 1 | 4 | 4 | 0 | 4 | Advance to knockout stage |
| 3 | Sweden | 3 | 0 | 3 | 0 | 4 | 4 | 0 | 3 | Advance to knockout stage |
| 4 | Nigeria | 3 | 0 | 1 | 2 | 3 | 6 | −3 | 1 | |

Source: FIFA
8 June 2015
15:00 CDT (UTC−5)

| Sweden | 3–3 | Nigeria |
|---|---|---|
| Oparanozie 21' (o.g.); Fischer 31'; Sembrant 60' | Report | Okobi 50'; Oshoala 53'; Ordega 87' |

Investors Group Field, Winnipeg
Attendance: 31,148
Referee: Ri Hyang-ok (North Korea)

12 June 2015
19:00 CDT (UTC−5)

| United States | 0–0 | Sweden |
|---|---|---|
| | Report |

Investors Group Field, Winnipeg
Attendance: 32,716
Referee: Sachiko Yamagishi (Japan)

16 June 2015
18:00 MDT (UTC−6)

| Australia | 1–1 | Sweden |
|---|---|---|
| De Vanna 5' | Report | Jakobsson 15' |

Commonwealth Stadium, Edmonton
Attendance: 10,177
Referee: Lucila Venegas (Mexico)

=== Round of 16 ===
20 June 2015
16:00 EDT (UTC−4)

| Germany | 4–1 | Sweden |
|---|---|---|
| Mittag 24'; Šašić 36' (pen.), 78'; Marozsán 88' | Report | Sembrant 82' |

TD Place Stadium, Ottawa
Attendance: 22,486
Referee: Ri Hyang-ok (North Korea)

== 2019 World Cup ==
After the quarter-finals at European Championship 2017 Pia Sundhage had given up the post of national coach, followed by Peter Gerhardsson. In addition, record goalscorer Lotta Schelin could no longer be used due to a neck injury sustained in June 2017, ultimately prompting her to end her career in August 2018.

Qualifying opponents became Denmark, Ukraine, Hungary and Croatia. The Swedes started with a 2–0 victory in Croatia and then had to play for the first home game against Denmark, as the Danish association canceled the game because the Danish players did not want to compete because of disagreements with the association. UEFA finally scored the game 3-0 for Sweden.

The next three games won the Swedes with just one goal, but then lost in Ukraine with 0: 1, and thus for the first time against an Eastern European team. Although they then won the second leg against the Ukrainians, but by the defeat in the first leg, it was the last game in Denmark: with a draw or a victory, Sweden would qualify directly for the World Cup finals, in a defeat, the Danes would first time Since 2007, the finals have been reached again and Sweden should be in the playoffs of the best runners-up for the last European starting place. A goal from Sofia Jakobsson immediately after the half-time break gave Sweden a 1–0 win and qualified for the finals in France.

In France, for the first time Chile and Thailand and for the sixth time in the preliminary round, the USA were the group opponents. The Swedes started with a 2–0 victory against Chile, but had to wait until the 83rd minute for the first goal. The first goal came quicker in the 5–1 victory against Thailand, which was already achieved in the 6th minute. Even faster, they came into the backlog against the US in the third minute. The last goal of the 0–2 defeat then fell through a Jonna Andersson deflected shot. As second in the group, the Swedes met Canada and reached the quarter-final against Germany by a 1–0 victory. After 24 years without a competitive victory against Germany succeeded with a 2–1 to 0–1 deficit to the semi-finals against European champions Netherlands. In the semifinals the Swedes lost 1-0 after extra time. Sweden got a bronze medal after defeating England 2–1.

=== Group F ===
| Pos | Team | Pld | W | D | L | GF | GA | GD | Pts | Qualification |
|---|---|---|---|---|---|---|---|---|---|---|
| 1 | United States | 3 | 3 | 0 | 0 | 18 | 0 | +18 | 9 | Advance to knockout stage |
| 2 | Sweden | 3 | 2 | 0 | 1 | 7 | 3 | +4 | 6 | Advance to knockout stage |
| 3 | Chile | 3 | 1 | 0 | 2 | 2 | 5 | −3 | 3 | |
| 4 | Thailand | 3 | 0 | 0 | 3 | 1 | 20 | −19 | 0 | |

Source: FIFA
11 June 2019
18:00

| Chile | 0–2 | Sweden |
|---|---|---|
| | Report | Asllani 83'; Janogy 90+4' |

Roazhon Park, Rennes
Attendance: 15,875
Referee: Lucila Venegas (Mexico)

16 June 2019
15:00

| Sweden | 5–1 | Thailand |
|---|---|---|
| Sembrant 6'; Asllani 19'; Rolfö 42'; Hurtig 81'; Rubensson 90+6' (pen.) | Report | Kanjana 90+1' |

Allianz Riviera, Nice
Attendance: 9,354
Referee: Salima Mukansanga (Rwanda)

20 June 2019
21:00

| Sweden | 0–2 | United States |
|---|---|---|
| | Report | Horan 3'; Andersson 50' (o.g.) |

Stade Océane, Le Havre
Attendance: 22,418
Referee: Anastasia Pustovoitova (Russia)

=== Round of 16 ===
24 June 2019
21:00

| Sweden | 1–0 | Canada |
|---|---|---|
| Blackstenius 55' | Report |

Parc des Princes, Paris
Attendance: 38,078
Referee: Kate Jacewicz (Australia)

=== Quarter-finals ===
29 June 2019
18:30

| Germany | 1–2 | Sweden |
|---|---|---|
| Magull 16' | Report | Jakobsson 22'; Blackstenius 48' |

Roazhon Park, Rennes
Attendance: 25,301
Referee: Stéphanie Frappart (France)

=== Semi-finals ===
3 July 2019
21:00

| Netherlands | 1–0 (a.e.t.) | Sweden |
|---|---|---|
| Groenen 99' | Report |

Parc Olympique Lyonnais, Décines-Charpieu
Attendance: 48,452
Referee: Marie-Soleil Beaudoin (Canada)

=== Third place play-off ===
6 July 2019
17:00

| England | 1–2 | Sweden |
|---|---|---|
| Kirby 31' | Report | Asllani 11'; Jakobsson 22' |

Allianz Riviera, Nice
Attendance: 20,316
Referee: Anastasia Pustovoitova (Russia)

== 2023 World Cup ==
=== Group G ===
| Pos | Team | Pld | W | D | L | GF | GA | GD | Pts | Qualification |
|---|---|---|---|---|---|---|---|---|---|---|
| 1 | Sweden | 3 | 3 | 0 | 0 | 9 | 1 | +8 | 9 | Advance to knockout stage |
| 2 | South Africa | 3 | 1 | 1 | 1 | 6 | 6 | 0 | 4 | Advance to knockout stage |
| 3 | Italy | 3 | 1 | 0 | 2 | 3 | 8 | −5 | 3 | |
| 4 | Argentina | 3 | 0 | 1 | 2 | 2 | 5 | −3 | 1 | |

Source: FIFA
Rules for classification: Group stage tiebreakers
23 July 2023
17:00 UTC+12

| Sweden | 2–1 | South Africa |
|---|---|---|
| Rolfö 65'; Ilestedt 90' | Report | Magaia 48' |

Wellington Regional Stadium, Wellington
Attendance: 18,317
Referee: Ekaterina Koroleva (United States)

29 July 2023
19:30 UTC+12

| Sweden | 5–0 | Italy |
|---|---|---|
| Ilestedt 39', 50'; Rolfö 44'; Blackstenius 45+1'; Blomqvist 90+5' | Report |

Wellington Regional Stadium, Wellington
Attendance: 29,143
Referee: Cheryl Foster (Wales)

2 August 2023
19:00 UTC+12

| Argentina | 0–2 | Sweden |
|---|---|---|
| | Report | Blomqvist 66'; Rubensson 90' (pen.) |

Waikato Stadium, Hamilton
Attendance: 17,907
Referee: Salima Mukansanga (Rwanda)

=== Round of 16 ===
6 August 2023
19:00 UTC+10

| Sweden | 0–0 (a.e.t.) | United States |
|---|---|---|
| | Report |
Penalties
| Rolfö (penalty scored); Rubensson (penalty scored); Björn (penalty missed); Blomqvist (penalty missed); Bennison (penalty scored); Eriksson (penalty scored); Hurtig (penalty scored) | 5–4 | (penalty scored) Sullivan; (penalty scored) Horan; (penalty scored) Mewis; (penalty missed) Rapinoe; (penalty missed) Smith; (penalty scored) Naeher; (penalty missed) O'Hara |

Melbourne Rectangular Stadium, Melbourne
Attendance: 27,706
Referee: Stéphanie Frappart (France)

=== Quarter-finals ===
11 August 2023
19:30 UTC+12

| Japan | 1–2 | Sweden |
|---|---|---|
| Hayashi 87' | Report | Ilestedt 32'; Angeldahl 51' (pen.) |

Eden Park, Auckland
Attendance: 43,217
Referee: Esther Staubli (Switzerland)

=== Semi-finals ===
15 August 2023
20:00 UTC+12

| Spain | 2–1 | Sweden |
|---|---|---|
| Paralluelo 81'; Carmona 89' | Report | Blomqvist 88' |

Eden Park, Auckland
Attendance: 43,217
Referee: Edina Alves Batista (Brazil)

=== Third place play-off ===
19 August 2023
18:00 UTC+10

| Sweden | 2–0 | Australia |
|---|---|---|
| Rolfö 30' (pen.); Asllani 62' | Report |

Lang Park, Brisbane
Attendance: 49,461
Referee: Cheryl Foster (Wales)

== FIFA World Cup record ==
| FIFA Women's World Cup record | | | | | | | | | | Qualification record | | | | | |
| Year | Host | Round | Position | Pld | W | D* | L | GF | GA | Pld | W | D | L | GF | GA |
|---|---|---|---|---|---|---|---|---|---|---|---|---|---|---|---|
| 1991 | China PR | Third place | 3rd | 6 | 4 | 0 | 2 | 18 | 7 | 6 | 4 | 2 | 0 | 13 | 3 |
| 1995 | Sweden | Quarter-finals | 5th | 4 | 2 | 1 | 1 | 6 | 4 | Qualified as hosts | | | | | |
| 1999 | United States | Quarter-finals | 6th | 4 | 2 | 0 | 2 | 7 | 6 | 6 | 6 | 0 | 0 | 18 | 5 |
| 2003 | United States | Runners-up | 2nd | 6 | 4 | 0 | 2 | 10 | 7 | 6 | 5 | 0 | 1 | 27 | 4 |
| 2007 | China PR | Group stage | 10th | 3 | 1 | 1 | 1 | 3 | 4 | 8 | 7 | 1 | 0 | 32 | 6 |
| 2011 | Germany | Third place | 3rd | 6 | 5 | 0 | 1 | 10 | 6 | 10 | 8 | 2 | 0 | 40 | 6 |
| 2015 | Canada | Round of 16 | 16th | 4 | 0 | 3 | 1 | 5 | 8 | 10 | 10 | 0 | 0 | 32 | 1 |
| 2019 | France | Third place | 3rd | 7 | 5 | 0 | 2 | 12 | 6 | 8 | 7 | 0 | 1 | 22 | 2 |
| 2023 | Australia/New Zealand | Third place | 3rd | 7 | 5 | 1 | 1 | 14 | 4 | 8 | 7 | 1 | 0 | 32 | 2 |
| 2027 | Brazil | To be determined | | | | | | | | To be determined | | | | | |
| 2031 | Costa Rica/Jamaica/Mexico/United States | To be determined | | | | | | | | To be determined | | | | | |
| 2035 | United Kingdom | To be determined | | | | | | | | To be determined | | | | | |
| Total | | Best: Runners-up | 9/12 | 47 | 28 | 6 | 13 | 85 | 52 | 62 | 54 | 6 | 2 | 216 | 29 |

FIFA Women's World Cup history
| Year | Host | Round | Date | Opponent | Result | Stadium |
|---|---|---|---|---|---|---|
| 1991 | China PR | Group stage | 17 November | United States | L 2–3 | Ying Dong Stadium, Panyu |
| 1991 | China PR | Group stage | 19 November | Japan | W 8–0 | New Plaza Stadium, Foshan |
| 1991 | China PR | Group stage | 21 November | Brazil | W 2–0 | Ying Dong Stadium, Panyu |
| 1991 | China PR | Quarter-finals | 24 November | China | W 1–0 | Tianhe Stadium, Guangzhou |
| 1991 | China PR | Semi-finals | 27 November | Norway | L 1–4 | Ying Dong Stadium, Panyu |
| 1991 | China PR | Third place play-off | 29 November | Germany | W 4–0 | Guangdong Provincial Stadium, Guangzhou |
| 1995 | Sweden | Group stage | 5 June | Brazil | L 0–1 | Olympia Stadion, Helsingborg |
| 1995 | Sweden | Group stage | 7 June | Germany | W 3–2 | Olympia Stadion, Helsingborg |
| 1995 | Sweden | Group stage | 9 June | Japan | W 2–0 | Arosvallen, Västerås |
| 1995 | Sweden | Quarter-finals | 13 June | China | D 1–1 (4–3 (p)) | Olympia Stadion, Helsingborg |
| 1999 | United States | Group stage | 19 June | China | L 1–2 | Spartan Stadium, San Jose |
| 1999 | United States | Group stage | 23 June | Australia | W 3–1 | Jack Kent Cooke Stadium, Landover |
| 1999 | United States | Group stage | 26 June | Ghana | W 2–0 | Soldier Field, Chicago |
| 1999 | United States | Quarter-finals | 30 June | Norway | L 1–3 | Spartan Stadium, San Jose |
| 2003 | United States | Group stage | 21 September | United States | L 1–3 | RFK Stadium, Washington, D.C. |
| 2003 | United States | Group stage | 25 September | North Korea | W 1–0 | Lincoln Financial Field, Philadelphia |
| 2003 | United States | Group stage | 28 September | Nigeria | W 3–0 | Columbus Crew Stadium, Columbus |
| 2003 | United States | Quarter-finals | 1 October | Brazil | W 2–1 | Gillette Stadium, Foxborough |
| 2003 | United States | Semi-finals | 5 October | Canada | W 2–1 | PGE Park, Portland |
| 2003 | United States | Final | 12 October | Germany | L 1–2 (a.e.t.) | The Home Depot Center, Carson |
| 2007 | China PR | Group stage | 11 September | Nigeria | D 1–1 | Chengdu Sports Center, Chengdu |
| 2007 | China PR | Group stage | 14 September | United States | L 0–2 | Chengdu Sports Center, Chengdu |
| 2007 | China PR | Group stage | 18 September | North Korea | W 2–1 | Tianjin Olympic Centre Stadium, Tianjin |
| 2011 | Germany | Group stage | 28 June | Colombia | W 1–0 | BayArena, Leverkusen |
| 2011 | Germany | Group stage | 2 July | North Korea | W 1–0 | Impuls Arena, Augsburg |
| 2011 | Germany | Group stage | 6 July | United States | W 2–1 | Volkswagen-Arena, Wolfsburg |
| 2011 | Germany | Quarter-finals | 10 July | Australia | W 3–1 | Impuls Arena, Augsburg |
| 2011 | Germany | Semi-finals | 13 July | Japan | L 1–3 | Commerzbank-Arena, Frankfurt |
| 2011 | Germany | Third place play-off | 16 July | France | W 2–1 | Rhein-Neckar-Arena, Sinsheim |
| 2015 | Canada | Group stage | 8 June | Nigeria | D 3–3 | Winnipeg Stadium, Winnipeg |
| 2015 | Canada | Group stage | 12 June | United States | D 0–0 | Winnipeg Stadium, Winnipeg |
| 2015 | Canada | Group stage | 16 June | Australia | D 1–1 | Commonwealth Stadium, Edmonton |
| 2015 | Canada | Round of 16 | 20 June | Germany | L 1–4 | TD Place, Ottawa |
| 2019 | France | Group stage | 11 June | Chile | W 2–0 | Roazhon Park, Rennes |
| 2019 | France | Group stage | 16 June | Thailand | W 5–1 | Allianz Riviera, Nice |
| 2019 | France | Group stage | 20 June | United States | L 0–2 | Stade Océane, Le Havre |
| 2019 | France | Round of 16 | 24 June | Canada | W 1–0 | Parc des Princes, Paris |
| 2019 | France | Quarter-finals | 29 June | Germany | W 2–1 | Roazhon Park, Rennes |
| 2019 | France | Semi-finals | 3 July | Netherlands | L 0–1 (a.e.t.) | Parc Olympique Lyonnais, Décines-Charpieu |
| 2019 | France | Third place play-off | 6 July | England | W 2–1 | Allianz Riviera, Nice |
| 2023 | Australia/New Zealand | Group stage | 23 July | South Africa | W 2–1 | Wellington Regional Stadium, Wellington |
| 2023 | Australia/New Zealand | Group stage | 29 July | Italy | W 5–0 | Wellington Regional Stadium, Wellington |
| 2023 | Australia/New Zealand | Group stage | 2 August | Argentina | W 2–0 | Waikato Stadium, Hamilton |
| 2023 | Australia/New Zealand | Round of 16 | 6 August | United States | D 0–0 (5–4 (p)) | Melbourne Rectangular Stadium, Melbourne |
| 2023 | Australia/New Zealand | Quarter-finals | 11 August | Japan | W 2–1 | Eden Park, Auckland |
| 2023 | Australia/New Zealand | Semi-finals | 15 August | Spain | L 1–2 | Eden Park, Auckland |
| 2023 | Australia/New Zealand | Third place play-off | 19 August | Australia | W 2–0 | Lang Park, Brisbane |

== Head-to-head record ==
| Opponent | Pld | W | D | L | GF | GA | GD | Win % |
|---|---|---|---|---|---|---|---|---|
| Argentina | 1 | 1 | 0 | 0 | 2 | 0 | +2 | 100.00 |
| Australia | 4 | 3 | 1 | 0 | 9 | 3 | +6 | 75.00 |
| Brazil | 3 | 2 | 0 | 1 | 4 | 2 | +2 | 66.67 |
| Canada | 2 | 2 | 0 | 0 | 3 | 1 | +2 | 100.00 |
| China | 3 | 1 | 1 | 1 | 3 | 3 | +0 | 33.33 |
| Chile | 1 | 1 | 0 | 0 | 2 | 0 | +2 | 100.00 |
| Colombia | 1 | 1 | 0 | 0 | 1 | 0 | +1 | 100.00 |
| England | 1 | 1 | 0 | 0 | 2 | 1 | +1 | 100.00 |
| France | 1 | 1 | 0 | 0 | 2 | 1 | +1 | 100.00 |
| Germany | 5 | 3 | 0 | 2 | 11 | 9 | +2 | 60.00 |
| Ghana | 1 | 1 | 0 | 0 | 2 | 0 | +2 | 100.00 |
| Italy | 1 | 1 | 0 | 0 | 5 | 0 | +5 | 100.00 |
| Japan | 4 | 3 | 0 | 1 | 13 | 4 | +9 | 75.00 |
| Netherlands | 1 | 0 | 0 | 1 | 0 | 1 | −1 | 0.00 |
| Nigeria | 3 | 1 | 2 | 0 | 7 | 4 | +3 | 33.33 |
| North Korea | 3 | 3 | 0 | 0 | 4 | 1 | +3 | 100.00 |
| Norway | 2 | 0 | 0 | 2 | 2 | 7 | −5 | 0.00 |
| South Africa | 1 | 1 | 0 | 0 | 2 | 1 | +1 | 100.00 |
| Spain | 1 | 0 | 0 | 1 | 1 | 2 | −1 | 0.00 |
| Thailand | 1 | 1 | 0 | 0 | 5 | 1 | +4 | 100.00 |
| United States | 7 | 1 | 2 | 4 | 5 | 11 | −6 | 14.29 |
| Total | 47 | 28 | 6 | 13 | 85 | 52 | +33 | 59.57 |

== Goalscorers ==
| Player | Goals | 1991 | 1995 | 1999 | 2003 | 2007 | 2011 | 2015 | 2019 | 2023 |
|---|---|---|---|---|---|---|---|---|---|---|
| Victoria Svensson | 6 | | | 2 | 3 | 1 | | | | |
| Lena Videkull | 6 | 5 | 1 | | | | | | | |
| Hanna Ljungberg | 5 | | | 2 | 3 | | | | | |
| Pia Sundhage | 5 | 4 | 1 | | | | | | | |
| Anneli Andelén | 4 | 3 | 1 | | | | | | | |
| Lotta Schelin | 4 | | | | | 2 | 2 | | | |
| Kosovare Asllani | 4 | | | | | | | | 3 | 1 |
| Fridolina Rolfö | 4 | | | | | | | | 1 | 3 |
| Amanda Ilestedt | 4 | | | | | | | | | 4 |
| Malin Andersson | 3 | | 2 | | 1 | | | | | |
| Lisa Dahlkvist | 3 | | | | | | 3 | | | |
| Malin Moström | 3 | | | 1 | 2 | | | | | |
| Linda Sembrant | 3 | | | | | | | 2 | 1 | |
| Sofia Jakobsson | 3 | | | | | | | 1 | 2 | |
| Stina Blackstenius | 3 | | | | | | | | 2 | 1 |
| Rebecka Blomqvist | 3 | | | | | | | | | 3 |
| Nilla Fischer | 2 | | | | | | 1 | 1 | | |
| Helen Nilsson | 2 | 2 | | | | | | | | |
| Josefine Öqvist | 2 | | | | 1 | | 1 | | | |
| Kristin Bengtsson | 1 | | | 1 | | | | | | |
| Marie Hammarström | 1 | | | | | | 1 | | | |
| Susanne Hedberg | 1 | 1 | | | | | | | | |
| Madelen Janogy | 1 | | | | | | | | 1 | |
| Lina Hurtig | 1 | | | | | | | | 1 | |
| Elin Rubensson | 1 | | | | | | | | 1 | 1 |
| Ingrid Johansson | 1 | 1 | | | | | | | | |
| Ulrika Kalte | 1 | | 1 | | | | | | | |
| Jessica Landström | 1 | | | | | | 1 | | | |
| Malin Lundgren | 1 | 1 | | | | | | | | |
| Therese Sjögran | 1 | | | | | | 1 | | | |
| Jane Törnqvist | 1 | | | 1 | | | | | | |
| Filippa Angeldahl | 1 | | | | | | | | | 1 |
| Own goals | 2 | 1 | | | | | | 1 | | |
| Total | 85 | 18 | 6 | 7 | 10 | 3 | 10 | 5 | 12 | 14 |

Own goals scored for opponents

- Jonna Andersson (scored for United States in 2019)

== See also ==
- Sweden at the UEFA Women's Championship
