= Sweden at the UEFA Women's Championship =

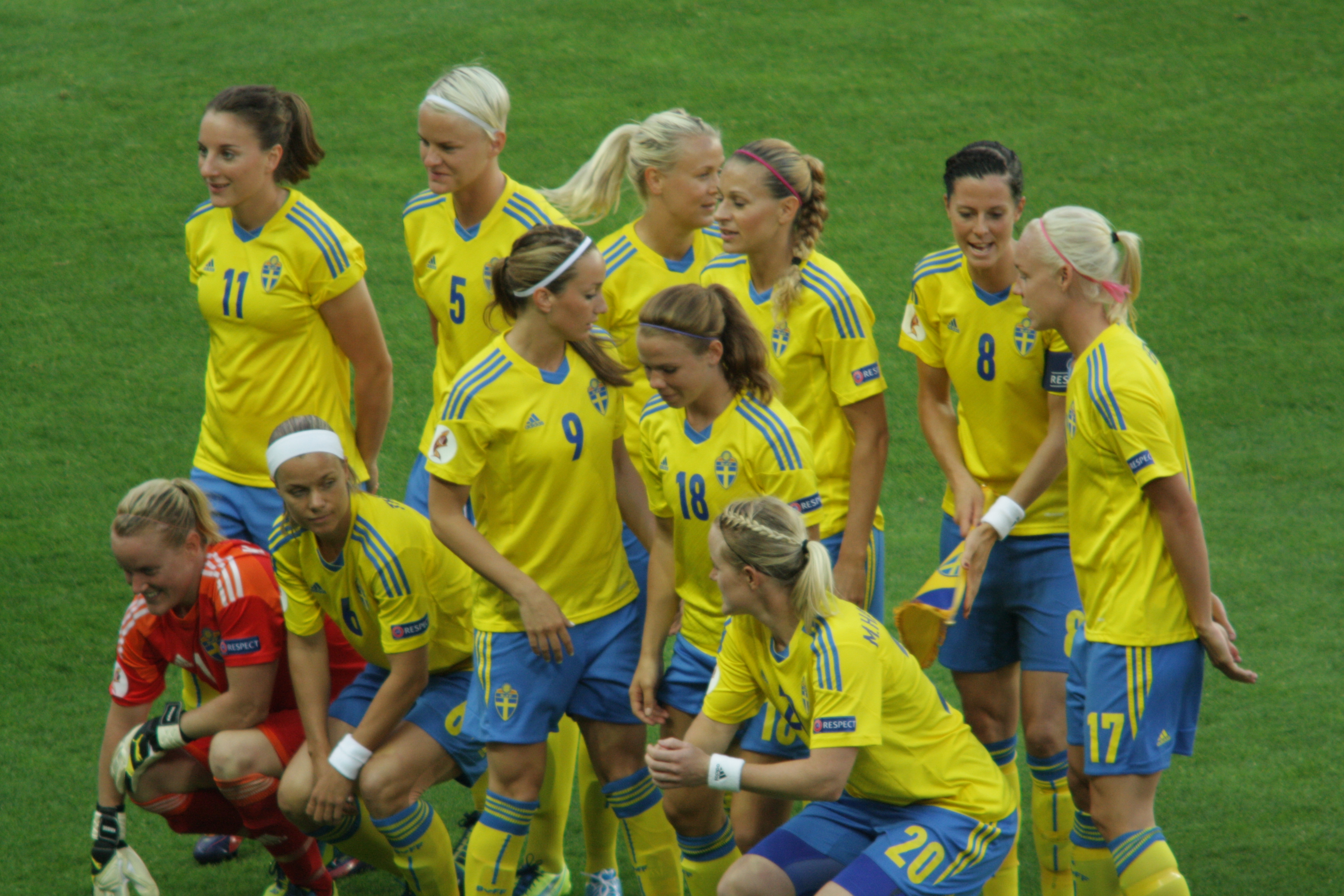
Sweden in the UEFA Women's Euro 2013.

Sweden have participated ten times at the UEFA Women's Championship: in 2009, in 2017. They won the tournament in 1984.

== 1984 ==
For the first European championship had reported only 16 teams. As the qualification groups were split geographically, the Swedish team had to qualify against Norway, Finland and Iceland compete. Sweden started qualifying on 18 August 1982 with a 6-0 win in Finland and also won all other games. The Swedes conceded only one goal in the last game, a 2-1 victory in Norway. This Sweden was in the semifinals and met in two games on Italy. First, they won 3: 2 in Rome and then the second leg 2: 1. Thus Sweden had reached the finals, in which England was the opponent. Since both won their home games 1-0, it came in the second game to the penalty shootout, which the Swedes won 4: 3 and thus became European champion. With three goals, Pia Sundhage was the top scorer in the finals.

== 1987 ==
Already in the same year began the qualification for the next European Championship, for which only 16 teams had reported. On a geographical division this time was waived with one exception. Sweden now hit Netherlands, Belgium and France. Sweden won five games and lost only in the Netherlands, which also lost to Belgium. Thus, the Swedes had won the group by two points ahead at the end.

The final of the top four teams was then allowed to align Norway, which took advantage of the home advantage. In the semifinals, it came first to the final revenge of 1984 against England and after again tenacious fight the Swedes had again the better end for themselves. But in the final they lost the title to Norway. Best Swedish goal scorer at the finals this time was Gunilla Axén with two goals.

== 1989 ==
Already three months after the final began qualifying for the next finals. Sweden again hit the Netherlands, Ireland and Scotland, which retreated after two games. Sweden could win only the home game against Ireland, also played two draws and lost the last decisive match for the group victory in the Netherlands. In second place they scored in the first quarter-final on Denmark and won in Odense with 5: 1. This was enough to make it 1-1 in the second leg to reach the finals. In contrast, group winners Netherlands failed to Norway, against which the Swedes then lost in the final round in the semifinals. In the small final Sweden then secured by a 2: 1 victory after extra time against Italy in third place.

== Euro 1991 ==
In qualifying for the following European Championship finals, the Swedes met France and Poland. Sweden won the four games and conceded only in the two 4: 1 home victories goals. In the quarter-finals Italy were the opponents and after a 1-1 in Malmö it was enough in Castellammare only to a goalless draw. This was the departure of Sweden on the basis of the away goals rule. As the best quarter-final losers, the Swedes qualified for the first 1991 FIFA Women's World Cup in China.

== Euro 1993 ==
23 teams took part in the qualification for the following European Championship. In order to qualify for the quarter-finals Sweden had to play again in the group stage against Ireland and for the first time Spain, against which the qualification began with a 4-0 victory. After a 1-1 draw in the second leg and a 1-0 win in Ireland, the qualifiers ended with a 10-0 win over Ireland, which was surpassed 18 years later. In the quarterfinals then the Danes were the opponents. First they lost 2-1 at home Borås and then only 1-1 in the second leg. Sweden was not qualified for the top four again.

== Euro 1995 ==
Just nine months after the quarter-finals began with 29 teams qualifying for the next European Championship, which was held again and for the last time without a final round. Sweden first met Latvia and the Slovakia, which participated for the first time. With four wins without conceding Sweden was group winner again. In the quarterfinals it came then to the revenge against the Danes, this time first had to compete at home and won 2-0. By a 3-0 in the second leg Sweden could qualify for the semi-finals, which was played as in 1984 with a return match. Opponent was Norway, who won at home 4: 3. With a 4: 1 win in the second leg, the Swedes could make up for this defeat and move into the final. This took place in a game in Germany. Sweden took the lead in [Kaiserslautern] in front of 8,500 fans in the sixth minute through Malin Andersson, which also lasted 26 minutes. Then Maren Meinert equalized. In the second half, the Germans then could add two more goals before Anneli Andelén could refill in the 88th minute. For Germany, this was the third title win and since then no other team could win the title.

== Euro 1997 ==
Six months after the final began for Sweden qualifying for the next European Championship finals for the now 34 teams had reported and was held for the first time with eight teams. Due to the different skill level of the teams announced the qualification was divided into two categories. The 16 strongest teams, which also included Sweden, played for the direct qualification to play the 18 weaker teams for the possibility of the next qualification in the higher category. In the first match Sweden once again met Denmark and won there 2-1. Sweden then met Romania for the first time and won 8-0. Against the third opponent Spain, there was the only point loss in the home game 1-1, but the other three games were won, and a a. 8-0 in Spain, which is still the highest defeat for Spain. Thus Sweden was qualified as a group winner directly for the finals. Denmark in second and Spain in third then prevailed in the playoffs against Portugal and England and were also allowed to the final round.

Sweden and Norway then hosted the final together for the first time, which also saw a group stage for the first time. Sweden denied all matches on home soil and met in the group stage on three newcomers EM. In the first game Russia was the opponent first and was defeated 2-1. After that qualification opponent Spain waited, who obviously had learned from the 0: 8 and this time only with 0: 1 lost. With a 3-0 win over France Sweden then closed the group stage and met in the semifinals on defending Germany. In a long open game, Bettina Wiegmann could score the only goal in the 84th minute. Germany could then defend the title in the final against Italy.

== Euro 2001 ==
In qualifying for the 2001 European Championships, the Swedes played again in the higher category and met three old acquaintances: France, Spain and the Netherlands. Sweden were struggling at first as they only won 5-2 in Spain in the first three games, with the other two finishing in a draw. After a 3-0 victory at the Dutch women, was lost in France with 0: 2, but then won in Spain with 7: 0. But this was only enough for second place behind France, which had lost no game. This forced Sweden into the playoffs against Finland and won both games (5: 2 and 5: 1). Spain, however, failed in the playoffs to Denmark.

In the final round in Germany was lost in the first group match with 1: 3 against the hosts. However, Hanna Ljungberg had already brought her team into the lead in the 14th minute, which lasted only 30 minutes. Shortly before the half-time whistle, the equalizer had to be conceded and then two goals in the second half. In the second game against England was then won 4-0. With a 1-0 in the last game against Russia, the team then secured second place. In the semi-final, the Swedes then met once again on Denmark and Tina Nordlund secured the finals with their goal in the 9th minute. Here again Germany was the opponent. Since both failed to score in 90 minutes this time, the Golden goal rule was renewed and the Germans defended the title. Two years later, both stood in the World Cup final again and again won the Germans by a golden goal.

== Euro 2005 ==
For the European Championship 2005, the host was first determined in advance and England was awarded the contract for the host. In category A this time 20 teams played in four groups of five and Sweden met Italy, Finland, Switzerland and for the first time Serbia and Montenegro. The Swedes started with six wins and were thus qualified early for the finals, but then lost in Italy and gave even in the last game in Finland from one point. Italy in second and Finland in third could then qualify in the playoffs as well.

In the final round, Sweden met Denmark in the first game and both drew 1-1. Also against qualifying opponents Finland it was enough only to a draw, this time without goals. Thus, Sweden was only in third place before the last game against hosts England and needed a victory to progress. This secured Anna Sjöström through the only goal of the game in the third minute and as the Finns surprisingly won against Denmark in the parallel match, Sweden was even group winner. In the semi-final against Norway, it was dramatic, because twice Hanna Ljungberg could compensate for a Norwegian lead, with one last minute before the end of the game. This was followed by an extra-time, in which Solveig Gulbrandsen secured the final for Norway with her second goal. There, the Norwegians lost but once again against Germany. With three goals, Hanna Ljungberg, together with three other players, was the second best scorer in the tournament.

== Euro 2009 ==
The European Football Championship 2009 took place in Finland. For the first time twelve teams participated in the tournament. The qualification mode has also been changed. The first qualifying round denied only the 20 weakest national teams. Sweden had to intervene only in the second round and met in a group of five on Italy, Ireland, Romania and Hungary. The Swedes were without a clean sheet and won all eight games. So they were qualified as group winners for the finals. The second-placed Italians also secured the final round ticket in the play-offs against the Czech Republic, while the third-placed Irinnen failed to Iceland. With eight goals, Victoria Sandell Svensson was the best Swedish and sixth overall top scorer in qualifying.

In the final round, the Swedes met Russia in the first game and won 3-0. The second game was followed by a 2-0 win over Italy. Thus, the Swedes needed from the last game against England only one point to become group winners and England was enough to reach a point as the best group Knights also the knockout round. And so both parted with 1: 1. In the quarterfinals, the Swedes were then favored against Norway, but lost with 1: 3.

== Euro 2013 ==
For the EURO 2013, Sweden and the Netherlands had applied as hosts and Sweden was awarded the contract, making it the second time in Sweden that Sweden did not qualify.

In the final round, Sweden and Denmark parted in the opening match as eight years earlier with 1-1. Against Finland succeeded then with 5: 0 the highest final round victory and by a 3: 1 against Italy the group victory was made perfect. In the quarterfinals then followed a 4-0 against Iceland, so that the Swedes slightly favored went into the semifinals against Germany, but lost 1-0. However, with five goals, Lotta Schelin was the best and Nilla Fischer second-best scorer of the finals with three goals.

=== Group A ===
Pos	Team	Pld	W	D	L	GF	GA	GD	Pts	Qualification
1	Sweden (H)	3	2	1	0	9	2	+7	7	Advance to knockout stage
2	Italy	3	1	1	1	3	4	−1	4	Advance to knockout stage
3	Denmark	3	0	2	1	3	4	−1	2	Advance to knockout stage
4	Finland	3	0	2	1	1	6	−5	2	

Source: UEFA.com
(H) Hosts

== Euro 2017 ==
The European Championship 2017 took place in the Netherlands in and for the first time with 16 teams. Sweden once again scored in qualifying for Denmark, Slovakia, Poland and for the first time the Moldova. Sweden was able to qualify as a group winner for the European Championship. The Swedes conceded in the penultimate group match against Slovakia at 2-1, the first goal and lost only the last group match against Denmark, but had already since the group victory safely. In the first qualifier Lisa Dahlkvist played her 100th and Caroline Seger her 150th international match in the fourth match.

For the draw of the finals on 8 November 2016, the Swedes were assigned pot 2 and the group B with defending champion Germany, Italy and Russia zugelost, making this the only group without a newcomer and without neighborhood duel was. The Swedes started with a goalless draw against the six-times defending champions, the first ever draw between the two teams. After a victory against the Russians, they could afford a 2:3 defeat against the already retired Italians, as Germany won in a parallel match against Russia. In the quarter-finals, they then lost to the hosts with 0-2 and retired from the tournament, which also ended the term of Pia Sundhage, which had previously announced this. Nevertheless, the Swedes improved in the eternal ranking for a place, as the previously placed before them Norwegians lost all three group matches. Lotta Schelin is now the only Swedish EM-record scorer with two goals in the Netherlands with a total of eight final round goals.

=== Group B ===
Pos	Team	Pld	W	D	L	GF	GA	GD	Pts	Qualification
1	Germany	3	2	1	0	4	1	+3	7	Knockout stage
2	Sweden	3	1	1	1	4	3	+1	4	Knockout stage
3	Russia	3	1	0	2	2	5	−3	3	
4	Italy	3	1	0	2	5	6	−1	3	

Source: UEFA
Rules for classification: Group stage tiebreakers
17 July 2017
20:45

Germany	0–0	Sweden
	Report

Rat Verlegh Stadion, Breda
Attendance: 9,276
Referee: Katalin Kulcsár (Hungary)

21 July 2017
18:00

Sweden	2–0	Russia
Schelin 22'; Blackstenius 51'	Report

De Adelaarshorst, Deventer
Attendance: 5,764
Referee: Stéphanie Frappart (France)

25 July 2017
20:45

Sweden	2–3	Italy
Schelin 14' (pen.); Blackstenius 47'	Report	Sabatino 4', 37'; Girelli 85'

De Vijverberg, Doetinchem
Attendance: 5,203
Referee: Esther Staubli (Switzerland)

=== Quarter-finals ===
29 July 2017
18:00

Netherlands	2–0	Sweden
Martens 33'; Miedema 64'	Report

De Vijverberg, Doetinchem
Attendance: 11,106
Referee: Bibiana Steinhaus (Germany)

== Euro 2022 ==
=== Group C ===
Pos	Team	Pld	W	D	L	GF	GA	GD	Pts	Qualification
1	Sweden	3	2	1	0	8	2	+6	7	Advance to knockout stage
2	Netherlands	3	2	1	0	8	4	+4	7	Advance to knockout stage
3	Switzerland	3	0	1	2	4	8	−4	1	
4	Portugal	3	0	1	2	4	10	−6	1	

Source: UEFA
9 July 2022
20:00

Netherlands	1–1	Sweden
Roord 52'	Report	Andersson 35'

Bramall Lane, Sheffield
Attendance: 21,342
Referee: Cheryl Foster (Wales)

13 July 2022
17:00

Sweden	2–1	Switzerland
Rolfö 53'; Bennison 79'	Report	Bachmann 55'

Bramall Lane, Sheffield
Attendance: 12,914
Referee: Marta Huerta de Aza (Spain)

17 July 2022
17:00

Sweden	5–0	Portugal
Angeldahl 21', 45'; C. Costa 45+7' (o.g.); Asllani 54' (pen.); Blackstenius 90+1'	Report

Leigh Sports Village, Leigh
Attendance: 7,118
Referee: Stéphanie Frappart (France)

=== Quarter-finals ===
22 July 2022
20:00

Sweden	1–0	Belgium
Sembrant 90+2'	Report

Leigh Sports Village, Leigh
Attendance: 7,517
Referee: Kateryna Monzul (Ukraine)

=== Semi-finals ===
26 July 2022
20:00

England	4–0	Sweden
Mead 34'; Bronze 48'; Russo 68'; Kirby 76'	Report

Bramall Lane, Sheffield
Attendance: 28,624
Referee: Esther Staubli (Switzerland)

== Euro 2025 ==
=== Group C ===
Pos	Team	Pld	W	D	L	GF	GA	GD	Pts	Qualification
1	Sweden	3	3	0	0	8	1	+7	9	Advance to knockout stage
2	Germany	3	2	0	1	5	5	0	6	Advance to knockout stage
3	Poland	3	1	0	2	3	7	−4	3	
4	Denmark	3	0	0	3	3	6	−3	0	

Source: UEFA
Rules for classification: Group stage tiebreakers
4 July 2025
18:00

Denmark	0–1	Sweden
	Report	Angeldahl 55'

Stade de Genève, Geneva
Attendance: 17,319
Referee: Edina Alves Batista (Brazil)

8 July 2025
21:00

Poland	0–3	Sweden
	Report	Blackstenius 28'; Asllani 52'; Hurtig 77'

Allmend Stadion Luzern, Lucerne
Attendance: 14,176
Referee: Maria Sole Ferrieri Caputi (Italy)

12 July 2025
21:00

Sweden	4–1	Germany
Blackstenius 12'; Holmberg 25'; Rolfö 34' (pen.); Hurtig 80'	Report	Brand 7'

Stadion Letzigrund, Zurich
Attendance: 22,552
Referee: Silvia Gasperotti (Italy)

=== Quarter-finals ===
17 July 2025
21:00

Sweden	2–2 (a.e.t.)	England
Asllani 2'; Blackstenius 25'	Report	Bronze 79'; Agyemang 81'
Penalties
Angeldahl (penalty missed); Zigiotti Olme (penalty scored); Eriksson (penalty missed); Björn (penalty scored); Falk (penalty missed); Jakobsson (penalty missed); Holmberg (penalty missed)	2–3	(penalty scored) Russo; (penalty missed) James; (penalty missed) Mead; (penalty missed) Greenwood; (penalty scored) Kelly; (penalty missed) Clinton; (penalty scored) Bronze

Stadion Letzigrund, Zurich
Attendance: 22,397
Referee: Marta Huerta de Aza (Spain)

== UEFA Women's Championship Record ==
UEFA Women's Championship record										Qualification record							
Year	Host	Round	Position	Pld	W	D *	L	GF	GA	Pld	W	D	L	GF	GA	P/R	Rnk
1984	Multiple	Champions	1st	4	3	0	1	6	4	6	6	0	0	26	1		
1987	Norway	Runners-up	2nd	2	1	0	1	4	4	6	5	0	1	14	3		
1989	West Germany	Third place	3rd	2	1	0	1	3	3	6	2	3	1	11	4		
1991	Denmark	Did not qualify								6	4	2	0	13	3		
1993	Italy	Did not qualify								6	3	2	1	18	4		
1995	Germany	Runners-up	2nd	3	1	0	2	9	8	6	5	0	1	25	2		
1997	Norway; Sweden	Semi-finals	3rd	4	3	0	1	6	2	6	5	1	0	26	2		
2001	Germany	Runners-up	2nd	5	3	0	2	7	4	8	5	2	1	28	10		
2005	England	Semi-finals	3rd	4	1	2	1	4	4	8	6	1	1	26	5		
2009	Finland	Quarter-finals	5th	4	2	1	1	7	4	8	8	0	0	31	0		
2013	Sweden	Semi-finals	3rd	5	3	1	1	13	3	Qualified as hosts							
2017	Netherlands	Quarter-finals	7th	4	1	1	2	4	5	8	7	0	1	22	3		
2022	England	Semi-finals	3rd	5	3	1	1	9	6	8	7	1	0	40	2		
2025	Switzerland	Quarter-finals	6th	4	3	1	0	10	3	10	6	2	2	26	4	(Note: From Euro 2025 onwards a new qualifying format was introduced, linked to the Women's Nations League where teams are divided into leagues with promotion/relegation between the leagues at the end of each cycle.)	9th
2029	Germany																
Total		Best: Champions	12/14	46	25	7	14	82	50	92	69	14	9	306	43	9th	

== See also ==
- Sweden at the FIFA Women's World Cup
