= Gísli Torfason =

Icelandic football defender and goalkeeper (1954–2005)

Personal information
- Date of birth: 10 July 1954
- Date of death: 21 May 2005 (aged 50)
- Place of death: Keflavík, Iceland
- Positions: Defender; goalkeeper

Senior career*
Years	Team	Apps	(Gls)
1971–1981	Keflavík		

International career
	Iceland U19	6	(0)
1973–1979	Iceland	29	(0)
- * Club domestic league appearances and goals

Gísli Torfason (10 July 1954 – 21 May 2005) was an Icelandic football defender and goalkeeper. He played in 29 matches for the Iceland national football team from 1973 to 1979, and in 1977, he was named Icelandic Footballer of the Year.

Gísli died on 21 May 2005, in Keflavík, at the age of 50.
