= Icelandic Footballer of the Year =

Football award in Iceland

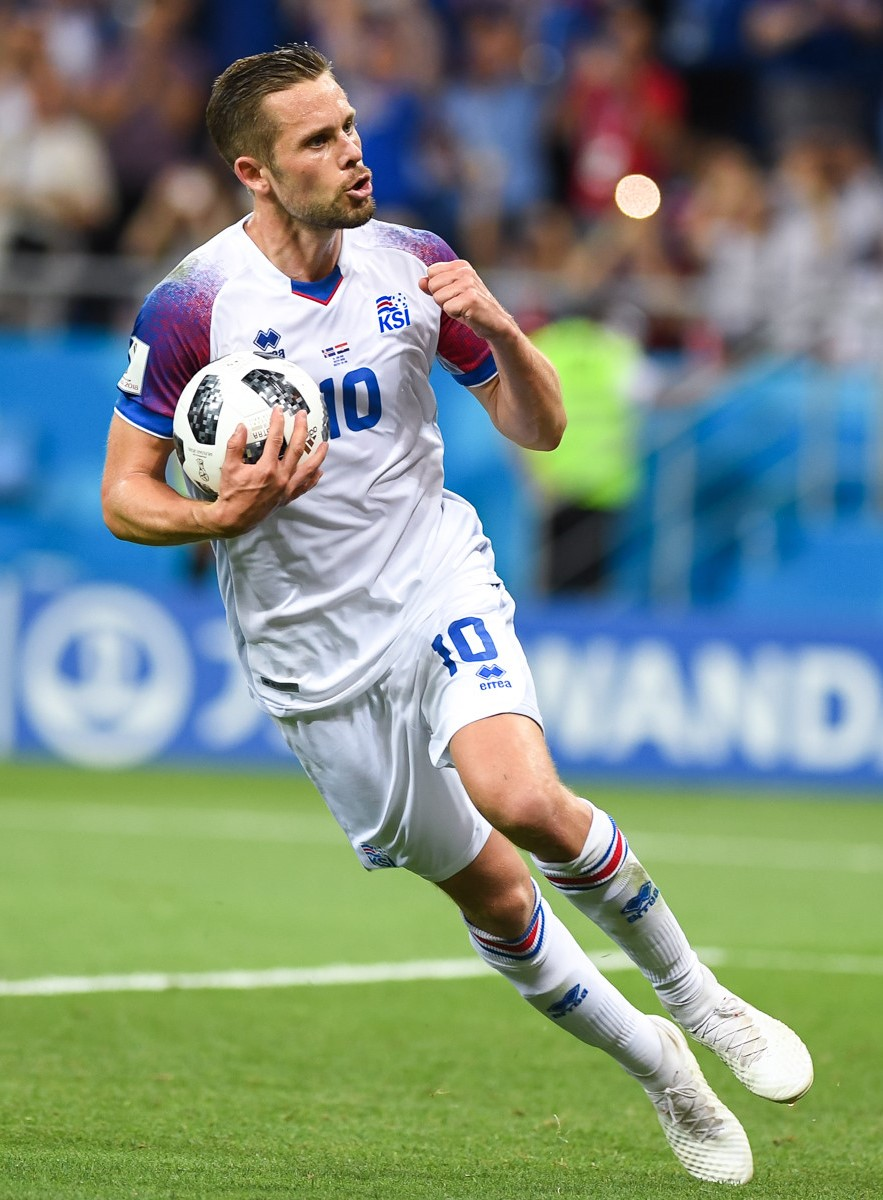
Gylfi Sigurðsson, pictured here at the 2018 FIFA World Cup, is a nine-time winner of the men's award.

The Icelandic Footballer of the Year is an annual award chosen by a panel of officials, coaches and former players, to determine the best player in Iceland.

== History ==
The inaugural winner was Guðni Kjartansson in 1973. Initially, the award could have been given to both male and female players. In 1994, Ásta B. Gunnlaugsdóttir became the first woman to win the award. In 1997, the award was split into men and women's categories.

In 1989, Ólafur Þórðarson won the award whilst playing abroad, having played for Norwegian club Brann.

Up until 2004, the award had been chosen by the Football Association of Iceland. It is now chosen by a panel of officials, coaches and former players.

== Winners ==
=== Men & Women ===
Year	Player	Club
1973	Guðni Kjartansson	(Iceland) Keflavík
1974	Jóhannes Eðvaldsson	(Iceland) Valur
1975	Árni Stefánsson	(Iceland) Fram
1976	Jón Pétursson	(Iceland) Fram
1977	Gísli Torfason	(Iceland) Keflavík
1978	Karl Þórðarson	(Iceland) ÍA
1979	Marteinn Geirsson	(Iceland) Fram
1980	Matthías Hallgrímsson	(Iceland) ÍA
1981	Guðmundur Baldursson	(Iceland) Fram
1982	Þorsteinn Bjarnason	(Iceland) Keflavík
1983	Sigurður Jónsson	(Iceland) ÍA
1984	Bjarni Sigurðsson	(Iceland) ÍA
1985	Guðmundur Þorbjörnsson	(Iceland) Valur
1986	Guðmundur Torfason	(Iceland) Fram
1987	Pétur Ormslev	(Iceland) Fram
1988	Sævar Jónsson	(Iceland) Valur
1989	Ólafur Þórðarson	(Norway) Brann
1990	Bjarni Sigurðsson	(Iceland) Valur
1991	Eyjólfur Sverrisson	(Germany) Stuttgart
1992	Arnar Gunnlaugsson	(Iceland) ÍA
1993	Sigurður Jónsson	(Iceland) ÍA
1994	Ásta Gunnlaugsdóttir	(Iceland) Breiðablik
1995	Birkir Kristinsson	(Iceland) Fram
1996	Ólafur Adolfsson	(Iceland) ÍA

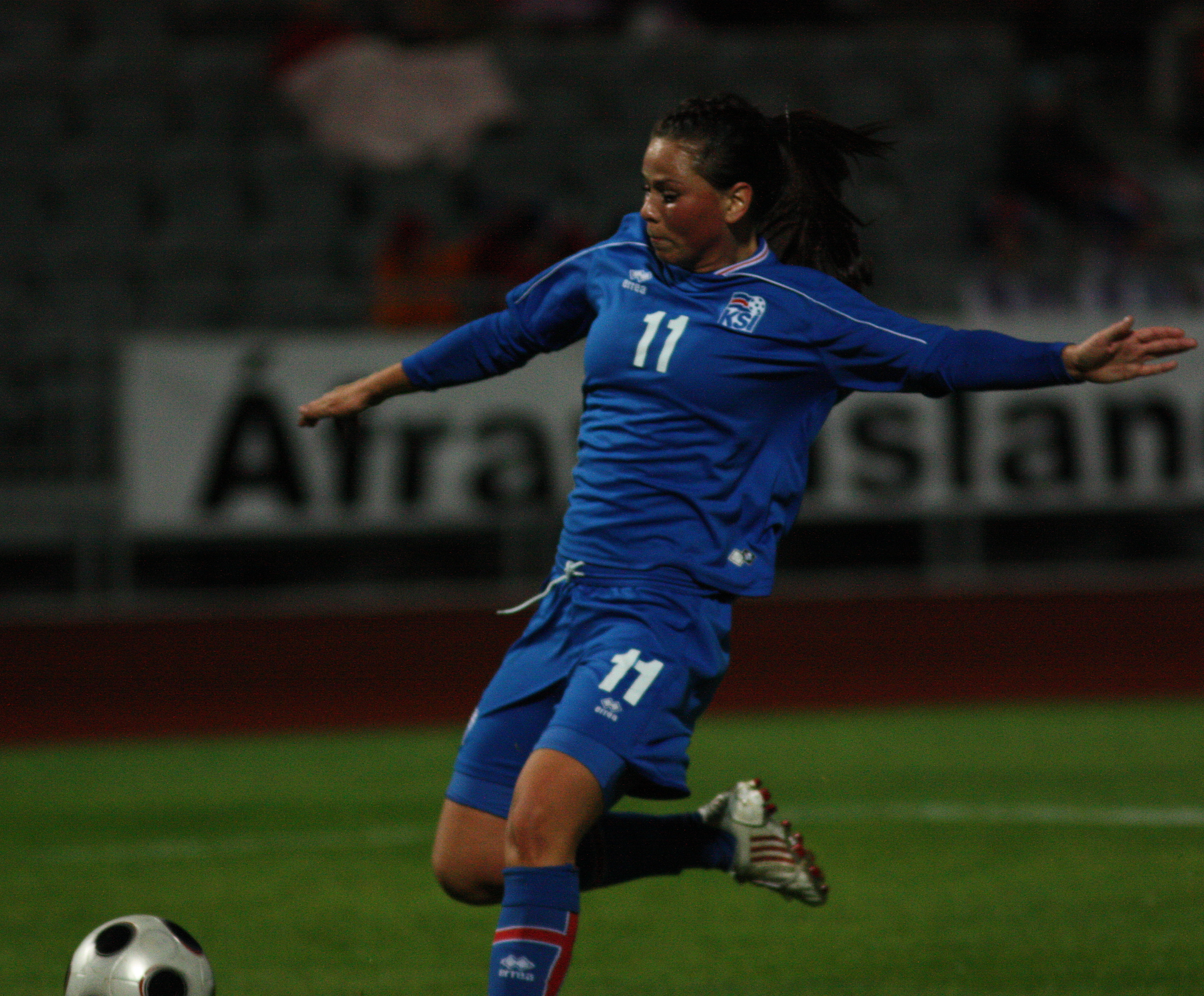
Sara Björk Gunnarsdóttir, pictured here in 2009, is a seven-time winner of the women's award.

=== Men ===
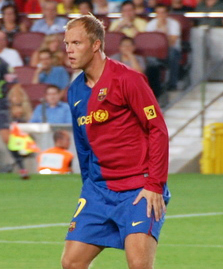
Eiður Guðjohnsen, pictured here playing for Barcelona in 2008, is a seven-time winner of the men's award.

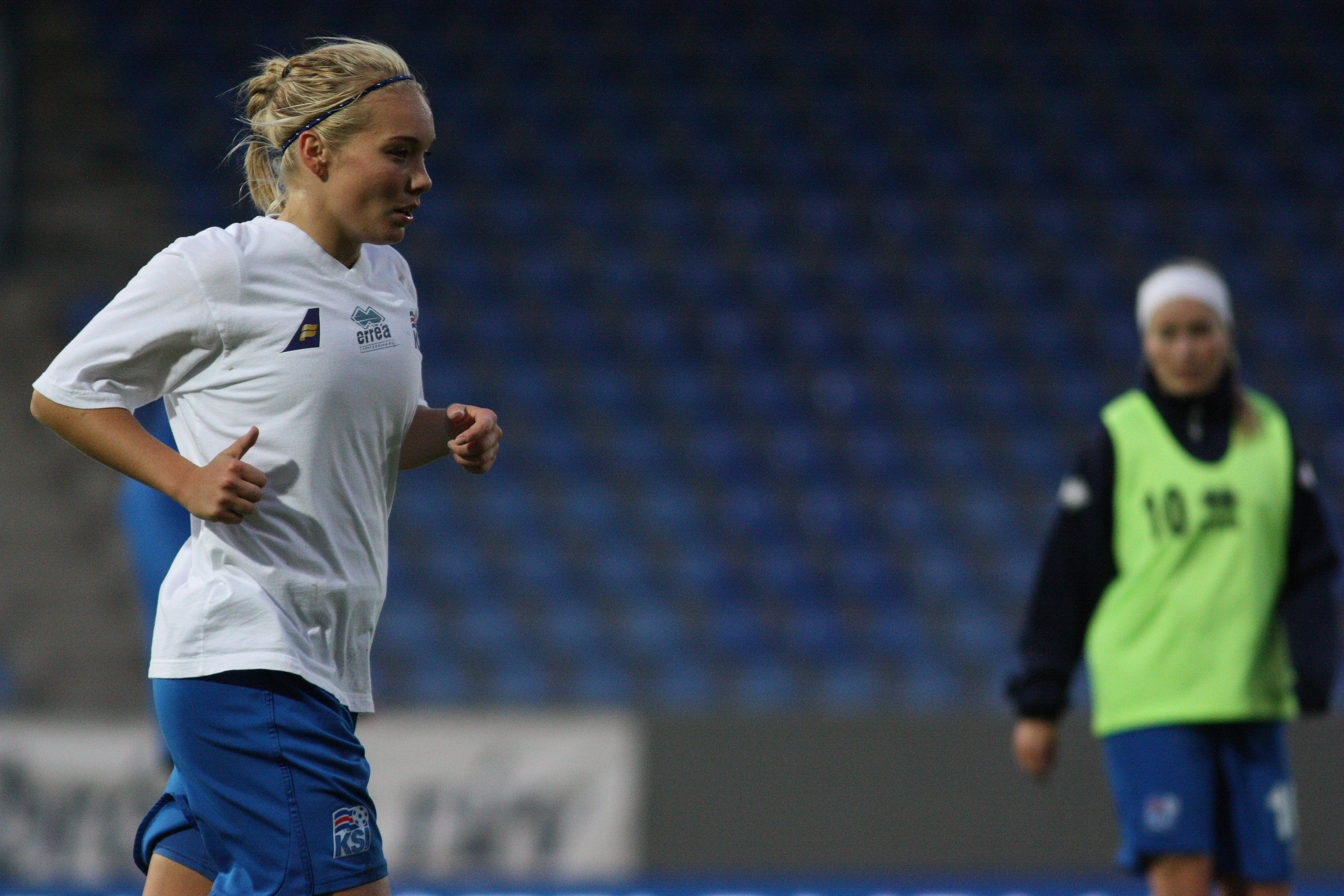
Margrét Lára Viðarsdóttir, pictured here on the left in 2009, is a five-time winner of the women's award.

Year	Player	Club	Ref.
1997	Hermann Hreiðarsson	(England) Crystal Palace	
1998	Eyjólfur Sverrisson	(Germany) Hertha Berlin	
1999	Eyjólfur Sverrisson	(Germany) Hertha Berlin	
2000	Hermann Hreiðarsson	(England) Ipswich Town	
2001	Eiður Guðjohnsen	(England) Chelsea	
2002	Rúnar Kristinsson	(Belgium) Lokeren	
2003	Eiður Guðjohnsen	(England) Chelsea	
2004	Eiður Guðjohnsen	(England) Chelsea	
2005	Eiður Guðjohnsen	(England) Chelsea	
2006	Eiður Guðjohnsen	(England) Chelsea (Spain) Barcelona	
2007	Hermann Hreiðarsson	(England) Portsmouth	
2008	Eiður Guðjohnsen	(Spain) Barcelona	
2009	Eiður Guðjohnsen	(Spain) Barcelona (France) Monaco	
2010	Gylfi Sigurðsson	(England) Reading (Germany) Hoffenheim	
2011	Heiðar Helguson	(England) Queens Park Rangers	
2012	Gylfi Sigurðsson	(England) Swansea City (England) Tottenham Hotspur	
2013	Gylfi Sigurðsson	(England) Tottenham Hotspur	
2014	Gylfi Sigurðsson	(England) Tottenham Hotspur (England) Swansea City	
2015	Gylfi Sigurðsson	(England) Swansea City	
2016	Gylfi Sigurðsson	(England) Swansea City	
2017	Gylfi Sigurðsson	(England) Swansea City (England) Everton	
2018	Gylfi Sigurðsson	(England) Everton	
2019	Gylfi Sigurðsson	(England) Everton	
2020	Gylfi Sigurðsson	(England) Everton	
2021	Kári Árnason	(Iceland) Víkingur Reykjavík	
2022	Hákon Haraldsson	(Denmark) Copenhagen	
2023	Hákon Haraldsson	(Denmark) Copenhagen (France) Lille	
2024	Orri Óskarsson	(Denmark) Copenhagen (Spain) Real Sociedad	
2025	Hákon Haraldsson	(France) Lille	

=== Women ===
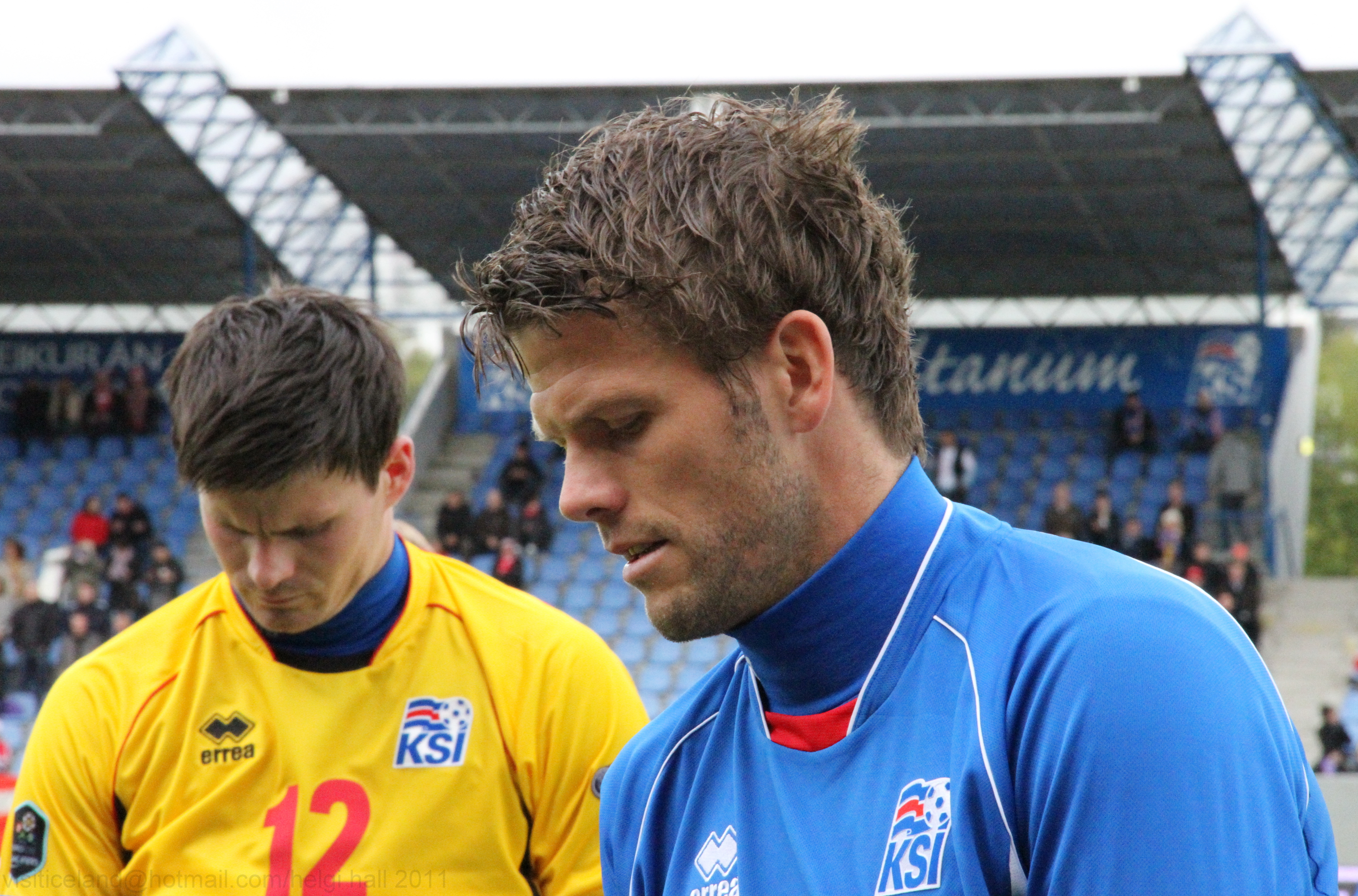
Hermann Hreiðarsson, pictured here on the right in 2011, is a three-time winner of the men's award.

Year	Player	Club	Ref.
1997	Guðrún Jóna Kristjánsdóttir	(Iceland) KR	
1998	Katrín Jónsdóttir	(Norway) Kolbotn	
1999	Guðlaug Jónsdóttir	(Iceland) KR	
2000	Rakel Ögmundsdóttir	(Iceland) Breiðablik	
2001	Olga Færseth	(Iceland) KR	
2002	Ásthildur Helgadóttir	(Iceland) KR	
2003	Ásthildur Helgadóttir	(Iceland) KR	
2004	Margrét Lára Viðarsdóttir	(Iceland) ÍBV	
2005	Ásthildur Helgadóttir	(Sweden) Malmö FF Dam	
2006	Margrét Lára Viðarsdóttir	(Iceland) Valur	
2007	Margrét Lára Viðarsdóttir	(Iceland) Valur	
2008	Margrét Lára Viðarsdóttir	(Iceland) Valur	
2009	Þóra Björg Helgadóttir	(Norway) Kolbotn	
2010	Hólmfríður Magnúsdóttir	(United States) Philadelphia Independence	
2011	Margrét Lára Viðarsdóttir	(Sweden) Kristianstads	
2012	Þóra Björg Helgadóttir	(Sweden) LdB FC Malmö	
2013	Sara Björk Gunnarsdóttir	(Sweden) LdB FC Malmö	
2014	Harpa Þorsteinsdóttir	(Iceland) Stjarnan	
2015	Sara Björk Gunnarsdóttir	(Sweden) Rosengård	
2016	Sara Björk Gunnarsdóttir	(Sweden) Rosengård (Germany) Wolfsburg	
2017	Sara Björk Gunnarsdóttir	(Germany) Wolfsburg	
2018	Sara Björk Gunnarsdóttir	(Germany) Wolfsburg	
2019	Sara Björk Gunnarsdóttir	(Germany) Wolfsburg	
2020	Sara Björk Gunnarsdóttir	(Germany) Wolfsburg (France) Olympique Lyonnais	
2021	Sveindís Jane Jónsdóttir	(Iceland) Breiðablik (Germany) Wolfsburg	
2022	Glódís Perla Viggósdóttir	(Germany) Bayern Munich	
2023	Glódís Perla Viggósdóttir	(Germany) Bayern Munich	
2024	Glódís Perla Viggósdóttir	(Germany) Bayern Munich	
2025	Glódís Perla Viggósdóttir	(Germany) Bayern Munich	

== See also ==
- List of sports awards honoring women
