= Selyatino =

Selyatino Селятино
- Urban-type settlement
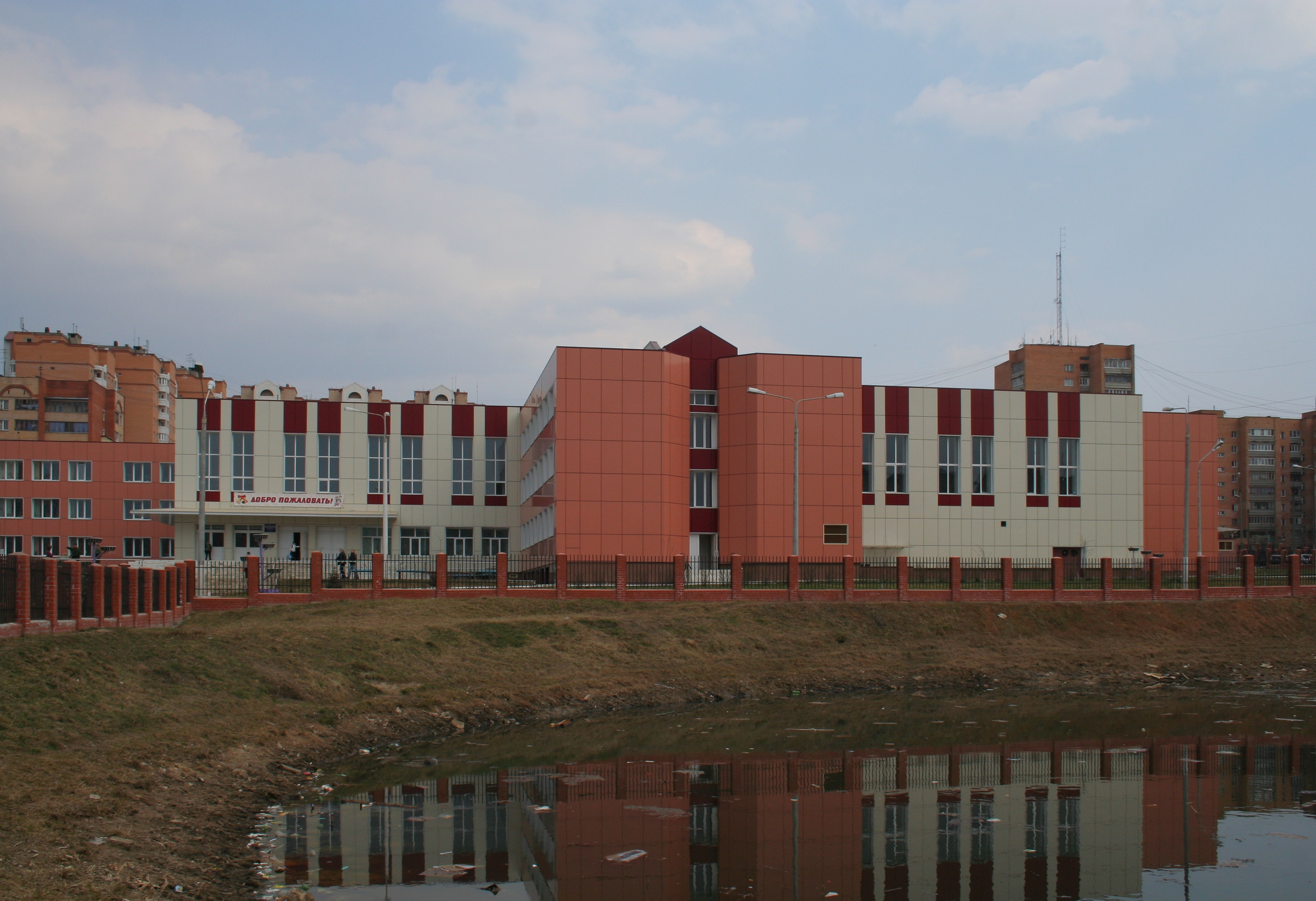
- A school in Selyatino

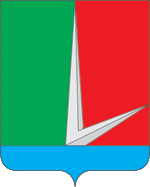
- Flag Coat of arms
- Interactive map of Selyatino
- Location of Selyatino Selyatino (Moscow Oblast)
- Coordinates: 55.5148°N 36.9786°E
- Country: Russia
- Federal subject: Moscow Oblast
- Administrative district: Naro-Fominsky District

Population (2010 Census)
  - Total: 12,629
  - Estimate (2025): 14,537 (+15.1%)
- Time zone: UTC+3 (MSK)
- Postal code: 143345
- OKTMO ID: 46638168051

Selyatino (Russian: Селятино) is an urban locality (an urban-type settlement) in Naro-Fominsky District of Moscow Oblast, Russia. Population: 12,629 (2010 census); 13,062 (2002 census);
