= Jóhanna Gunnlaugsdóttir =

Icelandic academic

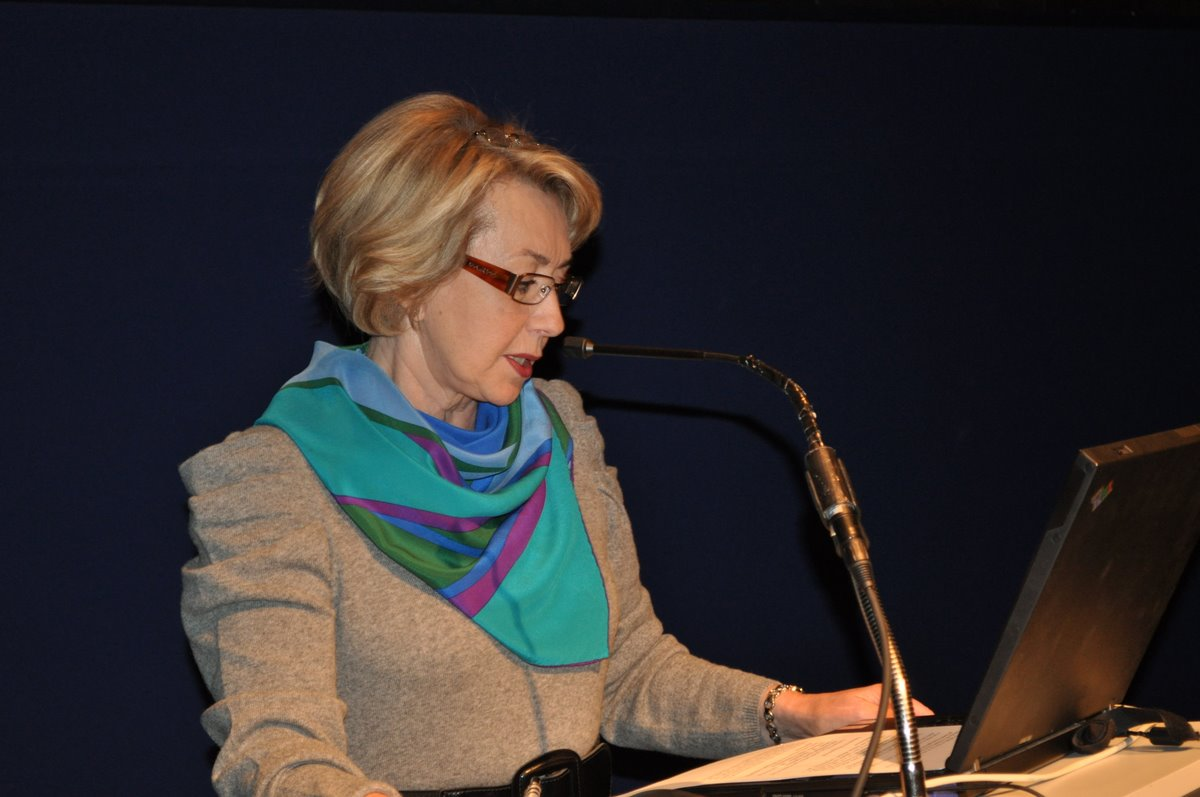
- Occupations: Professor in Information and Records Management and Electronic Communications at the University of Iceland

Jóhanna Gunnlaugsdóttir is a professor in Information and Records Management and Electronic Communications in the Faculty of Sociology, Anthropology and Folkloristics at the University of Iceland.

== Professional experience ==
Jóhanna completed a BA in Library Science and History from the University of Iceland in 1985, an MSc (Econ) in the Management and Operations of Companies, with emphasis on information institutions and companies' information systems from the University of Wales in 1998, and a doctorate in Information Science from the University of Tampere, Finland, in 2006. She is the first Icelander to get a PhD in Information and Records Management.

Jóhanna has held various positions, for example, at Garðaskóli Primary School (teaching) and the Garðabær Municipal Library. In 1986, she and others founded Gangskör sf., a consultancy and services firm in the field of information and records management (IRM). At Gangskör sf., she consulted for about 25 years for 100 companies and institutions on IRM and library matters. Her work included preparing and writing articles, reports, records and manuals on IRM. In addition, she designed for clients and introduced various functional classification systems and electronic records management systems. Since 1989, she has held various courses and lectures on IRM for the Icelandic Management Association, Continuing Education at the University of Iceland, Icelandic Records Management Association, Knowledge Management Association, University of Iceland, Ministry of Finance and Economic Affairs, University of Akureyri, Reykjavik University, and others.

Jóhanna taught information science part-time (then library and information science) at the University of Iceland's Faculty of Social Sciences from 1997 to 1999. She became assistant professor in 1999, associate professor in 2007 and professor in 2008. She has, since then regularly chaired courses of study and been a guest lecturer at various universities in Iceland and abroad. She has advised many master's and doctoral students and edited Icelandic and foreign journals.

== Other work and projects ==
Jóhanna has been on the boards of directors of various organisations, for example, regarding library and information matters. She was one of the founders of the Icelandic Records Management Association in 1988 and was on its board of directors from 1988 to 1992. In 2005, she was one of the founders of the Knowledge Management Association. She was on the Board of Directors of Skólavarðan (organ of the Icelandic Teachers' Union) from 1986 to 1989 and on the Board of Directors of the Libraries' Service Centre from 1988 to 1991. In addition, she was a representative on the University of Iceland's University Forum; on the Faculty of Sociology, Anthropology and Folkloristics' Committee on Teaching Affairs from 2007 to 2008; on the Board of Directors of the Social Sciences Institute of the University of Iceland, and on UI's Equal Rights Committee from 2009 to 2010, on the Science Committee of the Faculty of Sociology, Anthropology and Folkloristics from 2009 to 2013 and its chair from 2011 to 2013. She also worked on committees and in work groups under the auspices of the University Forum/Rector, as well as on the Marketing and Communications Committee from 2002 to 2007, in a workgroup on re-examining the University of Iceland's language policy from 2015 to 2016, in a workgroup on formulating the University of Iceland's policy on open admissions from 2011 to 2012, on the Language Committee from 2016 to 2018, on the Quality Control Committee since 2016, and on the University of Iceland's Steering Committee on Language Technology since 2018. Since 2018, she has worked in a collaborative group and on a study committee on a professional university programme in Health Data Sciences at the University of Iceland's Faculty of Medicine. Since 2014, she has sat on the management committee of the National Archives of Iceland, and since 2017, she has chaired the Icelandic Standardization Board's Technology Committee on translating ISO 15490-1, a standard on information and records management.

== Research ==
Jóhanna's research, teaching, and academic writings are in the fields of information and records management, knowledge management, quality management, and classification methods and theories. Her doctoral research, “The implementation and use of ERMS. A study in Icelandic organisations”, involves the introduction and use of electronic records management systems in organisations in Iceland. Jóhanna's other research projects have focused, for example, on looking into employees' personal use of social media during work hours, discussion of an international standard for records management, and the public's views towards the provision of government information, i.e., whether the public believes that government authorities will conceal important information regarding issues of public interest and governmental expenditures.

She has received various grants, such as from the University of Iceland's Research Fund. She was a participant in the research Power and Democracy, in the University of Iceland's School of Social Sciences, and received grants from UI's Centennial Anniversary Fund from 2013 to 2017. Since 2017, she has been part of a cross-disciplinary collaborative project at the University of Iceland, “Disability before Disability”. The project received a Grant of Excellence from The Icelandic Centre for Research.

== Acknowledgements ==
Jóhanna received the Order of the Falcon (Icelandic: Hin íslenska fálkaorða) in January 2020 for research and teaching in information and records management. In 2016 Jóhanna won the “Emerald Literati Network Awards 2016 for Excellence: Outstanding Paper from the Previous Year” in the field of information science for the article “Government secrecy: Public attitudes toward information provided by the authorities”, which was published in Records Management Journal. In 2019, along with Ragna Kemp Haraldsdóttir, Jóhanna received the same kind of award for the article “The missing link in information and records management: Personal knowledge registration” in Records Management Journal. Furthermore, the Icelandic Records Management Association made her an honorary member in 2008 on the association's 20th anniversary and in 2020 Information – the Icelandic Library and Information Science Association made her an honorary member.

== Personal life ==
Jóhanna's parents were the couple Gunnlaugur Jónsson (1928-2013) natural scientist and systems analyst and Bergthóra Jensen (1927-2013) preschool employee. Jóhanna is married to Árni Árnason, General Manager of Árvík, MBA (1974), University of Minnesota. They have two children.

== Main written works ==
- Jóhanna Gunnlaugsdóttir. Employee use of social media for private affairs during working hours. Journal of Social Media in Society, 5 (3), 2016, s. 121–150.
- Jóhanna Gunnlaugsdóttir. Government secrecy. Public attitudes toward information provided by the authorities. Records Management Journal, 25 (2), 2015, pp. 197–222. Emerald Literati Network 2016 Awards for Excellence: Outstanding Paper from the Previous Year (2015).
- Jóhanna Gunnlaugsdóttir. Information and records management: A precondition for a well-functioning quality management system. Records Management Journal, 22 (3), 2012, s. 170–185. Emerald Literati Network 2013 Awards for Excellence: Highly Commended Papers from the Previous Year (2012).
- Jóhanna Gunnlaugsdóttir. Reasons for the poor provision of information by the government. Public opinion. Records Management Journal, 26, (2), 2016, s. 185–205.
- Jóhanna Gunnlaugsdóttir. Registering and searching for records in electronic records management systems. International Journal of Information Management, 28, 2008, s. 293–304.
- Jóhanna Gunnlaugsdóttir. Seek and you will find, share and you will benefit. Organising knowledge using groupware systems. International Journal of Information Management, 23, 2003, s. 363–380.
- Ragna Kemp Haraldsdóttir og Jóhanna Gunnlaugsdóttir. The missing link in information and records management. Personal knowledge registration. Records Management Journal, 28 (1), s. 79–98, 2018. Emerald Literati Network 2019 Awards for Excellence: Outstanding Paper from the Previous Year (2018).
- Ragna Kemp Haraldsdóttir, Jóhanna Gunnlaugsdóttir, Ebba Thora Hvannberg, Peter Holdt Christensen. Registration, access and use of personal knowledge in organizations. International Journal of Information Management, 40, 2018, s. 8–16.
