= Ásta B. Gunnlaugsdóttir =

Icelandic footballer

Ásta Breiðfjörð Gunnlaugsdóttir
Personal information
- Date of birth: 13 May 1961 (age 65)
- Place of birth: Iceland

Senior career*
Years	Team	Apps	(Gls)
1974–1994	Breiðablik	181	(206)

International career
1981–1994	Iceland	26	(8)
- * Club domestic league appearances and goals as of 20 August 2020

Ásta Breiðfjörð Gunnlaugsdóttir (born 13 May 1961) is an Icelandic former footballer who made 26 appearances for the Iceland women's national football team. At club level, she played for Breiðablik for over 20 years.

== Personal life ==
Ásta was born on 13 May 1961. As a youngster, she played football and handball. Ásta is in a relationship with Samúel Örn Erlingsson. The couple live on the outskirts of Hella, and have previously lived in the United Kingdom. The couple have two daughters, both of whom have played football for Breiðablik. Her step-father Hermann Áskell Gunnarsson died in 2020.

== Career ==
Ásta made her debut for Breiðablik women's team at the age of 13. In 1985, Ásta scored 20 goals in 13 games for Breiðablik. Her goal tally was an Úrvalsdeild kvenna record for 28 years, until it was beaten by Harpa Þorsteinsdóttir. Ásta played for Breiðablik for over 20 years. In total, she made 181 appearances for Breiðablik, scoring 206 goals, more than any other Breiðablik player in history. She won 10 Úrvalsdeild kvenna championships, and was the league's top scorer three times. She also won the Icelandic Women's Football Cup in 1981 and 1983. Ásta scored two goals in the 1981 final, and one goal in the 1983 final.

At international level, Ásta played 26 matches for the Iceland women's national football team, scoring 8 times. Between 1981 and 1994, she played in all but three of Iceland's matches; she missed three matches as she was on maternity leave. She scored in Iceland's first ever match, which they lost 3–2.

Ásta retired from professional football in 1994. In the same year, she was awarded the Icelandic Footballer of the Year award, making her the first women to win the award. In 2015, Ásta and Sigurður Grétarsson were admitted into the Breiðablik hall of fame.

== International goals ==
No.	Date	Venue	Opponent	Score	Result	Competition
1.	20 September 1981	Kilmarnock, Scotland	Scotland	?–?	3–2	Friendly
2.	28 August 1982	Tønsberg, Norway	Norway	1–?	2–2	1984 European Competition for Women's Football qualifying
3.	17 August 1985	Sins, Switzerland	Switzerland	3–?	3–3	Friendly
4.	25 June 1986	Kópavogur, Iceland	Faroe Islands	1–0	6–0	Friendly
5.	22 June 1992	Akranes, Iceland	Scotland	2–?	2–1	UEFA Women's Euro 1993 qualifying
6.	26 September 1993	Reykjavík, Iceland	Netherlands	2–1	2–1	UEFA Women's Euro 1995 qualifying
7.	29 May 1994	Reykjavík, Iceland	Greece	1–0	3–0	UEFA Women's Euro 1995 qualifying
8.	30 October 1994	Brighton, England	England	1–1	1–2	UEFA Women's Euro 1995 qualifying
