= Estádio Dr. Manuel de Mello =

Former stadium in Barreiro, Portugal

Coordinates: 38°39′47.37″N 9°4′30.72″W

Estadio Dr. Manuel de Mello was a multi-use stadium in Barreiro, Portugal. It was used mostly for football matches and was the home stadium of FC Barreirense. The stadium was able to hold 10,500 people and was built in 1952. It is also used by Jehovah's witnesses as a venue for their district conventions.

On 16 September 2007, the last match was played on the turf of the D. Manuel de Mello Stadium. Demolition began at the start of 2008 and FC Barreirense's new pitch, Campo da Verderena, was completed in 2014 in the Verderena area of Barreiro.
