= 2012 USL W-League season =

Women's soccer league season

USL W-League
- Season: 2012
- Champions: Ottawa Fury Women (1st Title)
- Regular Season title: Pali Blues (2nd Title)
- Matches: 188
- Goals: 637 (3.39 per match)
- Best player: (United States) Grace Hawkins Long Island Lady Riders
- Best goalkeeper: (Italy) Anna Maria Picarelli Pali Blues

The 2012 W-League season was the 18th season of the league's existence, and 9th season of second division women's soccer in the United States. The regular season started on May 11 and ended on July 15.

== Changes from 2011 season ==
=== Name changes ===
One team changed their name in the off-season:

Team name	Metro area	Previous name
Colorado Rapids Women	Denver, Colorado	Colorado Force FC

=== Expansion teams ===
Three teams were added for the season:

Team name	Metro area	Location	Previous affiliation
(South Carolina) Central SC Cobras	Columbia, SC	Columbia, South Carolina	expansion
(Florida) VSI Tampa Flames	Tampa Bay area	Brandon, Florida	expansion
(Florida) FC JAX Destroyers	Jacksonville, FL	Jacksonville, Florida	expansion

=== Teams leaving ===
No teams either folded or left following the 2011 season:

== Standings ==
As of 7/15/2012
Orange indicates Host Team for W-League Championship
Purple indicates division title clinched
Green indicates playoff berth clinched

=== Eastern Conference ===
==== Atlantic Division ====
Team	Pld	W	L	T	GF	GA	GD	Pts
D.C. United Women	12	11	0	1	37	8	+29	34
Virginia Beach Piranhas	12	6	3	3	18	11	+7	21
Fredericksburg Impact	12	6	4	2	27	20	+7	20
Northern Virginia Majestics	12	2	9	1	7	28	−21	7
Dayton Dutch Lions	12	0	9	3	10	32	−22	3

==== Northeast Division ====
Team	Pld	W	L	T	GF	GA	GD	Pts
Long Island Rough Riders	12	9	3	0	37	8	+29	27
North Jersey Valkyries	12	7	3	2	33	12	+21	23
New Jersey Wildcats	12	6	2	4	38	15	+23	22
New York Magic	12	3	7	2	18	24	−6	11
New Jersey Rangers	12	1	11	0	9	76	−67	3

==== Southeast Division ====
Team	Pld	W	L	T	GF	GA	GD	Pts
Charlotte Lady Eagles	12	9	1	2	29	10	+19	29
Atlanta Silverbacks Women	12	8	1	3	36	8	+28	27
Central SC Cobras	12	3	5	4	22	24	−2	13
VSI Tampa Flames	12	3	7	2	15	31	−16	11
FC JAX Destroyers	12	1	10	1	9	38	−29	4

=== Central Conference ===
==== Central Division ====
Team	Pld	W	L	T	GF	GA	GD	Pts
Ottawa Fury Women	12	10	2	0	32	8	+24	30
Quebec City Amiral	12	8	2	2	23	15	+8	26
Laval Comets	12	6	3	3	17	10	+7	21
Toronto Lady Lynx	12	6	5	1	16	13	+3	19
Hamilton FC Rage	12	5	5	2	14	15	−1	17
Rochester Ravens	12	2	10	0	9	22	−13	6
London Gryphons	12	0	10	2	10	38	−28	2

=== Western Conference ===
==== Western Division ====
Team	Pld	W	L	T	GF	GA	GD	Pts
Pali Blues	14	13	0	1	36	3	+33	40
Seattle Sounders Women	14	10	3	1	31	8	+23	31
Colorado Rush	14	5	4	5	18	19	−1	20
Colorado Rapids Women	14	5	5	4	20	23	−3	19
Santa Clarita Blue Heat	14	4	6	4	25	22	+3	16
Vancouver Whitecaps Women	14	3	5	6	15	16	−1	15
Los Angeles Strikers	14	3	9	2	19	35	−16	11
Victoria Highlanders Women	14	1	12	1	7	45	−38	4

== Playoffs ==
- Note: Ottawa Fury hosts the W-League Championship and gains an automatic berth in the National Semi-Finals.

=== Eastern Conference Playoffs ===
July 21, 2012
3:30 PM EDT

(North Carolina) Charlotte Lady Eagles	4–0	(New York (state)) Long Island Rough Riders
Naeher 5', 44'; Wingo 52'; Braam 63'	Report

Maryland SoccerPlex
Boyds, MD
Attendance: 628
Referee: Matthew Richardson

July 21, 2012
6:00 PM EDT

(Washington, D.C.) D.C. United Women	3–0	Virginia Beach Piranhas
Siegel 23'; Lohman (yellow card) 33', (goal) 80'; Sanderson 45'	Report	Clarke (yellow card) 30'; Kalonji (yellow card) 33'

Maryland SoccerPlex
Boyds, MD
Attendance: 628
Referee: Michael Piercey

July 22, 2012
4:00 PM EDT

(Washington, D.C.) D.C. United Women	3–0	(North Carolina) Charlotte Lady Eagles
Sanderson 28' 52'; Siegel 42'	Report	Naeher (yellow card) 65'

Maryland SoccerPlex
Boyds, MD
Attendance: 688
Referee: Rebekah Friedrich

Divisional Semifinals
SE1	Charlotte Lady Eagles	4
NE1	Long Island Rough Riders	0
A1	D.C. United Women	3
A2	Virginia Beach Piranhas	0

Divisional Final
SE1	Charlotte Lady Eagles	0
A1	D.C. United Women	3

=== Central Conference Playoffs ===
July 21, 2012
1:00 PM EDT

Quebec City Amiral	6–1	(Ontario) Hamilton FC Rage
Belanger 12'; Trodi (yellow card) 43'; Mamay 44'; Gosselin 65'; Guy 68', 70', 89'	Report	Uremovich 71'

Collège François-Xavier-Garneau
Quebec City, QE
Attendance: 512
Referee: Jean-Philippe Jalbert

July 21, 2012
4:00 PM EDT

(Quebec) Laval Comets	3–1	(Ontario) Toronto Lady Lynx
Sanderson 2'; Pierre-Louis 45'; Thouvenot 83'	Report	Spencer (yellow card) 43'; Young 81'

Collège François-Xavier-Garneau
Quebec City, QE
Attendance: 48
Referee: Arfa Lyes

July 22, 2012
1:00 PM EDT

Quebec City Amiral	1–1 (a.e.t.)	(Quebec) Laval Comets
Paradis 30'	Report	Thouvenot 10'
Penalties
Sanderson (penalty scored); Robbins (penalty scored); Pierre Louis (penalty scored); Pinard (penalty missed); Walsh (penalty scored)	5–4	(penalty scored) Gosselin; (penalty scored) Paradis; (penalty scored) Trodi; (penalty scored) Leclerc; (penalty scored) Guy

Collège François-Xavier-Garneau
Quebec City, QE
Attendance: 580
Referee: Christopher Grabas

Divisional Semifinals
C2	Quebec City Amiral	6
C5	Hamilton FC Rage	1
C3	Laval Comets	3
C4	Toronto Lady Lynx	1

Divisional Final
C2	Quebec City Amiral (PEN)	1 (5)
C3	Laval Comets	1 (4)

=== Western Conference Playoff ===
July 22, 2012
1:00 PM PDT

(California) Pali Blues	1–0	(Washington (state)) Seattle Sounders Women
Andrews (yellow card) 42'; Williams 63'; Huffman (yellow card) 81'	Report

Titan Stadium
Fullerton, CA
Attendance: 287
Referee: Felisha Mariscal

== W-League Championship ==
=== Semi-finals ===
July 27, 2012
4:30PM EDT

(California) Pali Blues	2–0	Quebec City Amiral
Bogus 31' 77'	Report	Paradis (yellow card) 19th'

Algonquin College Soccer Complex
Ottawa, ON
Attendance: 185
Referee: Shauna Poirier

July 27, 2012
7:30PM EDT

(Ontario) Ottawa Fury Women	1–0	(Washington, D.C.) D.C. United Women
Hastings 44'; Gorry (yellow card) 77'	Report	Skogerboe (yellow card) 79'

Algonquin College Soccer Complex
Ottawa, ON
Attendance: 585
Referee: Sheena Dickson

==== Third Place Playoff ====
July 29, 2012
1:00 PM EDT

(Washington, D.C.) D.C. United Women	1–1 no (a.e.t.)	Quebec City Amiral
Skogerbee 53'	Report; Report	Belanger 17'
Penalties
Howell (penalty scored); Menchel (penalty missed); Sanderson (penalty scored); Brown (penalty scored); Weigel (penalty scored); Lohman (penalty scored); Skogerboe (penalty scored); Abegg (penalty scored)	7–6	(penalty scored) Manay; (penalty missed) Paradis; (penalty scored) Guy; (penalty scored) Roy; (penalty scored) Leclerc; (penalty scored) Fortin; (penalty scored) Gauthier; (penalty missed) Belanger

Algonquin College Soccer Complex
Ottawa, ON
Attendance: 140
Referee: Alexis Vaughn

=== Championship ===
July 29, 2012
4:00 PM EDT

(Ontario) Ottawa Fury Women	1–1 (a.e.t.)	(California) Pali Blues
Busque 90+4'; Conheeney (yellow card) 98'; Williamson (yellow card) 113'	Report; Report; Report; Report	Washington 2'; Shaner (yellow card) 54'
Penalties
Wetzel (penalty scored); Seal (penalty scored); Woods (penalty scored); Ryan (penalty missed); Conheeney (penalty scored)	4–3	(penalty scored) Lytle; (penalty missed) Engen; (penalty missed) Nogueira; (penalty scored) Huffman; (penalty scored) Bogus

Algonquin College Soccer Complex
Ottawa, ON
Attendance: 785
Referee: Michelle Pye

Semi-Finals
1	Pali Blues	2
4	Quebec City Amiral	0
2	D.C. United Women	0
3	Ottawa Fury Women	1

Championship
1	Pali Blues	1(3)
3	Ottawa Fury Women	1(4)

== Awards ==
- Most Valuable Player: (United States) Grace Hawkins, (LIR)
- Rookie of the Year: (United States) Lynn Williams, (PAB)
- Defender of the Year: (Canada) Cindy Walsh, (LAV)
- Coach of the Year: (United States) Charlie Naimo, (PAB)
- Goalkeeper of the Year: (Italy) Anna Maria Picarelli, (PAB)

== All-League and All-Conference Teams ==
=== Eastern Conference ===
F: (United States) Kristin Burton (ATL), (United States) Grace Hawkins (LIR)*, (England) Mikaela Howell (DCU)
M: (United States) Yael Averbuch (NJW)*, (United States) Ashley Clarke (NJV), (United States) Hayley Siegel (DCU)
D: (United States) Marisa Abegg (DCU), (Scotland) Vaila Barsley (LIR)*, (United States) Sabbath McKiernan-Allen (CHR), (United States) Tabitha Padgett (CSC)
G: (United States) Robyn Jones (CHR)

=== Central Conference ===
F: (Canada) Nkem Ezurike (LAV), (Canada) Kinley McNicoll (TOR), (Tunisia) Imen Trodi (QUE)*
M: (Canada) Catherine Charron-Delage (LAV), (Australia) Katrina Gorry (OTT), (Norway) Lisa-Marie Woods (OTT)
D: (Canada) Alyscha Mottershead (TOR), (Canada) Haillie Price (HAM), (Canada) Cindy Walsh (LAV)*, (United States) Kathryn Williamson (OTT)
G: (Canada) Jasmine Phillips (OTT)

=== Western Conference ===
F: (Portugal) Edite Fernandes (SCL), (Canada) Jenna Richardson (VAN), (United States) Lynn Williams (PAB)*
M: (United States) Brittany Bock (COL), (United States) Sarah Huffman (PAB)*, (Mexico) Verónica Pérez (SEA)*
D: (Canada) Sasha Andrews (PAB)*, (United States) Stephanie Cox (SEA)*, (Taiwan) Michelle Pao (PAB), (Australia) Brooke Spence (COR)
G: (Italy) Anna Maria Picarelli (PAB)*

* denotes All-League player
