= 2015 USL W-League season =

W-League season

W-League
- Season: 2015
- Champions: Washington Spirit Reserves (1st Title)
- Regular Season title: Seattle Sounders Women (1st Title)
- Matches: 108
- Goals: 447 (4.14 per match)
- Best player: (Australia) Tara Andrews Colorado Pride
- Top goalscorer: (Australia) Tara Andrews Colorado Pride (18 Goals)
- Best goalkeeper: (United States) Britt Eckerstrom Colorado Pride
- Biggest home win: WAS 7, BRSE 0 (June 6); COP 7, COS 0 (June 9); COR 7, COS 0 (June 13); SCB 7, ARI 0 (July 3)
- Biggest away win: COR 12, ARI 0 (May 28)
- Highest scoring: COR 12, ARI 0 (May 28)
- Highest attendance: 787 COP vs. SEA (July 3)
- Lowest attendance: 35 NJV vs. NYM (June 20); COR vs. SCB (July 9)
- Average attendance: 196 (79 of 108 games reported)

The 2015 W-League season was the 21st and last season of the league's existence, and 12th season of second division women's soccer in the United States. The regular season started on May 16 and ended on July 18.

== Changes from 2014 season ==
=== Teams leaving ===
Seven teams folded or self-relegated following the 2014 season:

- Bay Area Breeze - San Francisco, California
- Gulf Coast Texans - Pensacola, Florida
- K-W United FC - Waterloo, Ontario
- London Gryphons - London, Ontario
- Los Angeles Blues - Los Angeles, California
- Ottawa Fury Women - Ottawa, Ontario
- Toronto Lady Lynx - Toronto, Ontario

=== Name changes ===
One team changed its name in the off-season:

Team name	Metro area	Previous Name
Arizona Strikers FC	Yuma, Arizona	Sedona FC Strikers

== Standings ==
=== Northeastern Conference ===
Pos	Team	Pld	W	D	L	GF	GA	GD	Pts	Qualification
1	Laval Comets	12	9	1	2	32	11	+21	28	2015 Championship Host
2	Quebec Dynamo ARSQ	12	8	2	2	22	12	+10	26	2015 Playoff Team
3	Long Island Rough Riders	12	6	2	4	24	15	+9	20	
4	North Jersey Valkyries	12	3	3	6	19	28	−9	10	
5	New Jersey Wildcats	12	3	1	8	13	30	−17	10	
6	New York Magic	12	1	3	8	16	30	−14	5	

Source: wleaguesoccer.com

=== Southeastern Conference ===
Pos	Team	Pld	W	D	L	GF	GA	GD	Pts	Qualification
1	Washington Spirit Reserves	12	9	3	0	38	11	+27	30	2015 W-League Champion
2	Charlotte Lady Eagles	12	9	2	1	40	16	+24	29	
3	Dayton Dutch Lions WFC	12	7	1	4	25	22	+3	22	
4	Atlanta Silverbacks Women	12	3	3	6	23	33	−10	12	
5	Carolina Elite Cobras	12	1	3	8	11	23	−12	6	
6	Braddock Road Stars Elite	12	1	0	11	5	37	−32	0	

Source: wleaguesoccer.com

=== Western Conference ===
Pos	Team	Pld	W	D	L	GF	GA	GD	Pts	Qualification
1	Seattle Sounders Women	12	10	1	1	44	11	+33	31	2015 Division Title
2	Colorado Pride	12	9	1	2	58	7	+51	28	2015 Playoff Team
3	Colorado Rush	12	8	1	3	34	15	+19	25	
4	Santa Clarita Blue Heat	12	5	1	6	28	17	+11	16	
5	Colorado Storm	12	1	0	11	6	60	−54	3	
6	Arizona Strikers FC	12	1	0	11	9	69	−60	0	

Source: wleaguesoccer.com

== Playoffs ==
The Laval Comets were selected as host for the W-League Championship and gained an automatic berth in the National Semi-Finals. The top regular-season finisher in the Northeastern Conference (other than Laval) and the Southeastern Conference also qualified. The top two finishers in the Western Conference will meet on July 18 for a berth in the Championship.

=== Western Conference Playoff ===
July 18, 2015
3:00pm PDT

(Washington (state)) Seattle Sounders Women	1–2	Colorado Pride
Diaz (yellow card) 77'; Clark 84'	Report	Andrews 4', 17'

Starfire Sports Complex
Tukwila, Washington
Attendance: 215
Referee: Levi Rippy

== W-League Championship ==
=== Semi-finals ===
July 24, 2015
5:00pm EDT

(Washington, D.C.) Washington Spirit Reserves	1–0	Quebec Dynamo ARSQ
Aedo 39'; Stobbs (yellow card) 68'	Report	Vandal (yellow card) 39' (red card) 76'; Gauthier (yellow card) 45+'

Desjardins Stadium
Laval, Québec

July 24, 2015
7:30pm EDT

(Quebec) Laval Comets	0–4	Colorado Pride
Charron-Delage (yellow card) 63'	Report	Jerman 31'; Watt 42'; Andrews 45+'; O'breham 57' (o.g.)

Desjardins Stadium
Laval, Québec

=== Third Place Playoff ===
July 26, 2015
12:00pm EDT

(Quebec) Laval Comets	2–0	Quebec Dynamo ARSQ
Maranda 4'; Laverdiere 76'; Busque (yellow card) 90+'	Report	Levasseur (yellow card) 13'

Desjardins Stadium
Laval, Québec

=== Championship ===
July 26, 2015
2:30pm EDT

(Washington, D.C.) Washington Spirit Reserves	2–1	Colorado Pride
Aedo 26', 89'	Report; Report	Andrews 15'; Watt (yellow card) 70'

Desjardins Stadium
Laval, Québec

Semi-Finals
1	Washington Spirit Reserves	1
4	Quebec Dynamo ARSQ	0
2	Colorado Pride	4
3	Laval Comets	0

Championship
1	Washington Spirit Reserves	2
2	Colorado Pride	1

== Statistical leaders ==
=== Top scorers ===
Rank	Player	Nation	Club	Goals
1	Tara Andrews	AUS	Colorado Pride	18
2	Leah Fortune	USA	Charlotte Lady Eagles	12
3	Shan Jones	WAL	Long Island Rough Riders	11
3	Sara Sanau Ruiz	SPA	New York Magic	11
5	Danica Evans	USA	Colorado Rush	10
5	Kasandra Massey	USA	Santa Clarita Blue Heat	10
7	Melissa Fernandez	USA	Santa Clarita Blue Heat	9
7	Danielle Schulmann	ISR	North Jersey Valkyries	9
9	Kayla Adamek	POL	Laval Comets	8
9	Celeste Boureille	USA	Colorado Rush	8
9	Imani Dorsey	USA	Washington Spirit Reserves	8
9	Megan Dougherty-Howard	USA	Washington Spirit Reserves	8

== Awards ==
- Most Valuable Player: (Australia) Tara Andrews (PRI)
- Rookie of the Year: (United States) Imani Dorsey (WAS)
- Defender of the Year: (United States) Amanda Naeher (CHE)
- Coach of the Year: (France) Marc Mounicot (QUE)
- Goalkeeper of the Year: (United States) Britt Eckerstrom (PRI)
- Playoff MVP: (Chile) Yanara Aedo (WAS)

== All-League and All-Conference Teams ==
=== Northeastern Conference ===
F: (Wales) Shan Jones (LIR)*, (Spain) Sara Sanau-Ruiz (NYM), (Israel) Danielle Schulmann (NJV)
M: (Poland) Kayla Adamek (LAV)*, (Japan) Serina Kashimoto (NYM), (United States) Casie Ludemann (LIR)
D: (United States) Sue Weber (LIR)*, (United States) Catherine Chukuka (NJV), (Canada) Marie-Sandra Ujeneza (QUE), (Canada) Kelsey Wilson (LAV)*
G: (Canada) Rachelle Beanlands (LAV)

=== Southeastern Conference ===
F: (Brazil) Leah Fortune (CHE)*, (United States) Imani Dorsey (WAS), (South Africa) Ode Fulutudilu (DDL)
M: (United States) Alex Brandt (CHE), (United States) Megan Dougherty-Howard (WAS)*, (United States) Annie Speese (CHE)
D: (United States) Savannah McCaskill (CAR) *, (United States) Amanda Naeher (CHE)*, (United States) Carson Pickett (WAS), (United States) Kaleigh Riehl (BRSE)
G: (United States) Robyn Jones (CHE)

=== Western Conference ===
F: (Australia) Tara Andrews (PRI)*, (United States) Celeste Boureille (COR), (United States) Kasandra Massey (SCB)
M: (United States) Kelly Fitzgerald (COR), (United States) Rose Lavelle (SEA)*, (United States) Abby Rolph (COS)
D: (Scotland) Sophie Howard (PRI), (United States) Morgan Kennedy (COR), (United States) Chloe McDaniel (SCB), (Canada) Kinley McNicoll (SEA)
G: (United States) Britt Eckerstrom (PRI)*

* denotes All-League player
