= 2015 in Canadian soccer =

2015 in Canadian soccer

← 2014 · (Canada) · 2016 →

Men's Domestic Leagues
Div	League	Season	Cup/Playoffs
I	(United States) (Canada) MLS	Vancouver Whitecaps FC (3rd overall)	Two teams (MTL & VAN) (Conference Semifinals)
II	(United States) (Canada) NASL	Ottawa Fury FC (2nd overall)	Ottawa Fury FC (Second place)
III	(United States) (Canada) USL	Vancouver Whitecaps 2 (11th overall: Western Conference)	- (None qualified)
III	(Canada) L1O	Oakville Blue Devils (Champions)	Woodbridge Strikers (Champions)
III	(Canada) PLSQ	CS Mont-Royal Outremont (Champions)	Lakeshore SC (Champions)

Women's Domestic Leagues
Div	League	Season	Cup/Playoffs
I	(United States) NWSL	No Canadian teams	No Canadian teams
II	(United States) (Canada) W-League	Laval Comets (1st overall: Northeast Division)	Laval Comets (Third place)
III	(Canada) L1O	Durham United FC (Champions)	North Mississauga SC (Champions)

Men's Domestic Cups
Div	Name	Champion	Runner-Up
I	Canadian Championship	Vancouver Whitecaps FC	Montreal Impact
II	Canadian Championship	Vancouver Whitecaps FC	Montreal Impact
III	Inter-Provincial Cup	Oakville Blue Devils	CS Mont-Royal Outremont
IV	Challenge Trophy	London Marconi	Edmonton Scottish

Women's Domestic Cups
Div	Name	Champion	Runner-Up
IV	Jubilee Trophy	Edmonton Victoria	Royal Sélect Beauport

The following article is a summary of the 2015 soccer season in Canada.

== National teams ==
When available, the left column indicates the home team or the home team designate; the right column, away team or away team designate.

Win Draw Loss

=== Men ===
==== Senior ====
===== 2018 FIFA World Cup Qualifiers =====
11 June 2015 Round 2	Dominica	0–2	Canada	Roseau, Dominica
20:00 UTC−04:00		Report	Larin 5'; Teibert 63' (pen.)	Stadium: Windsor Park; Referee: Jeffrey Solís (Costa Rica)

16 June 2015 Round 2	Canada	4–0 (6–0 agg.)	Dominica	Toronto, Canada
19:37 UTC−04:00	Akindele 4'; Larin 41'; Ricketts 52', 77'	Report		Stadium: BMO Field; Attendance: 9,749; Referee: Gianni Ascani (Turks and Caicos Islands)

4 September 2015 Round 3	Canada	3–0	Belize	Toronto, Canada
19:30 UTC−04:00	Ricketts 25', 65'; Hutchinson 90+1'	Report		Stadium: BMO Field; Attendance: 10,412; Referee: John Pitti (Panama)

8 September 2015 Round 3	Belize	1–1 (1–4 agg.)	Canada	Belmopan, Belize
19:00 UTC−06:00	McCaulay 26'	Report	Johnson 45+1'	Stadium: FFB Stadium; Attendance: 1,800; Referee: Javier Santos (Puerto Rico)

13 November 2015 Round 4	Canada	1–0	Honduras	Vancouver, Canada
19:07 UTC−08:00	Larin 38'	Report		Stadium: BC Place; Attendance: 20,108; Referee: Kevin Morrison (Jamaica)

17 November 2015 Round 4	El Salvador	0–0	Canada	San Salvador, El Salvador
19:30 UTC−06:00		Report		Stadium: Estadio Cuscatlán; Referee: Mark Geiger (United States)

===== 2015 CONCACAF Gold Cup =====
8 July 2015 Group stage	El Salvador	0–0	Canada	Carson, United States
19:30 UTC−07:00		Report		Stadium: StubHub Center; Attendance: 22,468; Referee: Fernando Guerrero (Mexico)

11 July 2015 Group stage	Jamaica	1–0	Canada	Houston, United States
17:30 UTC−05:00	Austin 90+2'	Report		Stadium: BBVA Compass Stadium; Attendance: 22,017; Referee: Yadel Martínez (Cuba)

14 July 2015 Group stage	Canada	0–0	Costa Rica	Toronto, Canada
20:30 UTC−04:00		Report		Stadium: BMO Field; Referee: Héctor Rodríguez (Honduras)

CAN eliminated in the group stage.

===== Friendlies =====
16 January 2015 Friendly	Canada	1–2	Iceland	Orlando, United States
16:30 UTC−05:00	De Rosario 70'	Report	Steindorsson 6'; Vilhjalmsson 42'	Stadium: University of Central Florida; Attendance: 100

19 January 2015 Friendly	Canada	1–1	Iceland	Orlando, United States
16:00 UTC−05:00	De Rosario 30' (pen.)	Report	Friðjónsson 65' (pen.)	Stadium: University of Central Florida; Attendance: 200

27 March 2015 Friendly	Canada	1–0	Guatemala	Fort Lauderdale, United States
16:15 UTC−04:00	Haber 70'	Report		Stadium: Lockhart Stadium; Attendance: 5

30 March 2015 Friendly	Canada	3–0	Puerto Rico	Bayamón, Puerto Rico
19:30 UTC−04:00	Ricketts 42'; Edwini-Bonsu 60'; Larin 77'	Report		Stadium: Estadio Juán Rámon Loubriel

13 October 2015 Friendly	Canada	1–1	Ghana	Washington, D.C., United States
19:30 UTC−04:00	de Jong 28'	Report	Adomah 45'	Stadium: RFK Stadium

==== Olympic ====
Many Olympic competitions place certain age restrictions on competitors for the men's tournament (for example, a U-22 requirement at the 2015 Pan American Games). These teams are listed by Soccer Canada as "Olympic teams".

===== 2015 Pan American Games =====
12 July 2015 Group stage	Canada	1–4	Brazil	Hamilton, Canada
20:30 UTC−04:00	Babouli 56'	Report	Luciano 7'; Rômulo 38'; Clayton 47'; Erik 87'	Stadium: Hamilton Pan Am Soccer Stadium; Referee: José Peñaloza (Mexico)

16 July 2015 Group stage	Panama	0–0	Canada	Hamilton, Canada
20:30 UTC−04:00		Report		Stadium: Hamilton Pan Am Soccer Stadium; Referee: Valdin Legister (Jamaica)

20 July 2015 Group stage	Canada	0–2	Peru	Hamilton, Canada
20:30 UTC−04:00		Report	Rodas 12'; James 68' (o.g.)	Stadium: Hamilton Pan Am Soccer Stadium; Referee: Adrian Skeete (Barbados)

CAN eliminated in the group stage.

===== 2016 Olympic Qualifiers =====
1 October 2015 Group stage	United States	3–1	Canada	Kansas City, United States
20:00 UTC−05:00	Morris 1', 73'; Gil 90+2' (pen.)	Report	Petrasso 81'	Stadium: Sporting Park; Referee: Armando Castro (Honduras)

3 October 2015 Group stage	Canada	3–1	Panama	Kansas City, United States
13:30 UTC−05:00	Petrasso 30'; Thomas 35'; Fisk 74'	Report	Bárcenas 61'	Stadium: Sporting Park; Referee: Javier Santos (Puerto Rico)

6 October 2015 Group stage	Canada	2–2	Cuba	Commerce City, United States
17:00 UTC−06:00	Petrasso 26'; Babouli 52'	Report	Hernández 33', 87'	Stadium: Dick's Sporting Goods Park; Referee: Adrián Skeete (Barbados)

10 October 2015 Semifinals	Mexico	2–0	Canada	Sandy, United States
16:00 UTC−06:00	Torres 6'; Lozano 57'	Report		Stadium: Rio Tinto Stadium; Referee: Hugo Cruz (Costa Rica)

13 October 2015 Third place match	United States	2–0	Canada	Sandy, United States
17:00 UTC−06:00	Pelosi 69'; Kiesewetter 84' (pen.)	Report		Stadium: Rio Tinto Stadium; Referee: Armando Castro (Honduras)

CAN finishes in fourth place; does not qualify for the 2016 Summer Olympics.

=== Women ===
==== Senior ====
===== 2015 FIFA Women's World Cup =====
6 June 2015 Group stage	Canada	1–0	China	Edmonton, Canada
16:00 UTC−06:00	Sinclair 90+2' (pen.)	Report		Stadium: Commonwealth Stadium; Attendance: 53,058

11 June 2015 Group stage	Canada	0–0	New Zealand	Edmonton, Canada
19:00 UTC−06:00		Report		Stadium: Commonwealth Stadium; Attendance: 35,544; Referee: Bibiana Steinhaus (Germany)

15 June 2015 Group stage	Netherlands	1–1	Canada	Montréal, Canada
19:30 UTC−04:00	Van de Ven 87'	Report	Lawrence 10'	Stadium: Olympic Stadium; Attendance: 45,420

21 June 2015 Round of 16	Canada	1–0	Switzerland	Vancouver, Canada
16:30 UTC−07:00	Bélanger 52'	Report		Stadium: BC Place; Attendance: 53,855

27 June 2015 Quarterfinals	England	2–1	Canada	Vancouver, Canada
16:30 UTC−07:00	Taylor 11'; Bronze 14'	Report	Sinclair 42'	Stadium: BC Place; Attendance: 54,027; Referee: Claudia Umpierrez (Uruguay)

CAN eliminated in the quarterfinals.

===== 2015 Pan American Games =====
There were no age restrictions placed on teams in this tournament, Canada opted to enter an under-23 squad to provide experience for those who may join the senior national team in the future.

11 July 2015 Group stage	Canada	5–2	Ecuador	Hamilton, Canada
21:00 UTC−04:00	Beckie 12', 77'; Zadorsky 44', 48'; Fletcher 79'	Report	Moreira 29', 90'	Stadium: Hamilton Pan Am Soccer Stadium; Referee: Alondra Arellano (Mexico)

15 July 2015 Group stage	Costa Rica	2–0	Canada	Hamilton, Canada
20:30 UTC−04:00	Cruz 60'; Villalobos 74'	Report		Stadium: Hamilton Pan Am Soccer Stadium; Referee: Tatiana Guzman (Nicaragua)

19 July 2015 Group stage	Canada	0–2	Brazil	Hamilton, Canada
20:30 UTC−04:00		Report	Alves 55'; Cristiane 87'	Stadium: Hamilton Pan Am Soccer Stadium; Referee: Ekaterina Koroleva (United States)

22 July 2015 Semifinal	Colombia	1–0	Canada	Hamilton, Canada
20:35 UTC−04:00	Ospina 29'	Report		Stadium: Hamilton Pan Am Soccer Stadium; Referee: Mirian Leon (El Salvador)

24 July 2015 Bronze medal match	Mexico	2–1	Canada	Hamilton, Canada
20:35 UTC−04:00	Ocampo 29'; Mayor 37'	Report	Fleming 88' (pen.)	Stadium: Hamilton Pan Am Soccer Stadium; Referee: Ekaterina Koroleva (United States)

CAN finishes in fourth place.

===== 2015 Cyprus Women's Cup =====
4 March 2015 Group Stage	Canada	2–0	Scotland	Nicosia, Cyprus
17:30 UTC+02:00	Fleming 3'; Sinclair 55'	Report		Stadium: GSP Stadium; Attendance: 30

6 March 2015 Group Stage	Canada	1–0	South Korea	Larnaka, Cyprus
14:30 UTC+02:00	Sinclair 46'	Report		Stadium: GSZ Stadium; Attendance: 30

9 March 2015 Group Stage	Canada	1–0	Italy	Nicosia, Cyprus
14:30 UTC+02:00	Chapman 51'	Report		Stadium: GSP Stadium; Attendance: 30

11 March 2015 Final	Canada	0–1	England	Larnaka, Cyprus
18:30 UTC+02:00		Report	Sanderson 67'	Stadium: GSZ Stadium; Attendance: 100

CAN finishes in second place.

===== 2015 Four Nations Tournament =====
11 January 2015 BaoAn Cup	Canada	2–1	South Korea	Shenzhen, China
16:00 UTC+08:00	Beckie 51'; Buchanan 55'	Report	Yue 33'	Stadium: Shenzhen Bao'an Sports Center; Attendance: 365

13 January 2015 BaoAn Cup	Canada	2–1	Mexico	Shenzhen, China
16:00 UTC+08:00	Leon 47'; Sinclair 80'	Report	Corral 79'	Stadium: Shenzhen Bao'an Sports Center; Attendance: 532

15 January 2015 BaoAn Cup	Canada	2–1	China	Shenzhen, China
19:30 UTC+08:00	Sinclair 63' (pen.), 64'	Report	Gu 31'	Stadium: Shenzhen Bao'an Sports Center; Attendance: 6,683

CAN finishes in first place.

===== 2015 International Tournament of Natal =====
9 December 2015 Group stage	Canada	3–0	Mexico	Natal, Brazil
18:15 UTC−02:00	Sinclair 15', 20'; Prince 45+2'	Report		Stadium: Arena das Dunas; Attendance: 500

13 December 2015 Group stage	Trinidad and Tobago	0–4	Canada	Natal, Brazil
18:30 UTC−02:00		Report	Matheson 10'; Beckie 46'; Prince 81'; Sinclair 85'	Stadium: Arena das Dunas

16 December 2015 Group stage	Brazil	2–1	Canada	Natal, Brazil
20:45 UTC−02:00	Andressa Alves 12'; Debinha 40'	Report	Bélanger 43'	Stadium: Arena das Dunas

20 December 2015 Final	Brazil	3–1	Canada	Natal, Brazil
18:30 UTC−02:00	Andressa Alves 47'; Mônica 63', 81'		Beckie 46'	Stadium: Arena das Dunas; Attendance: 10,643; Referee: Report

CAN finishes in second place.

===== Friendlies =====
9 April 2015 Friendly	Canada	0–1	France	Bondoufle, France
21:00 UTC+02:00		Report	Le Sommer 34'	Stadium: Stade Robert-Bobin Evry; Attendance: 11,441

29 May 2015 Friendly	Canada	1–0	England	Hamilton, Canada
19:00 UTC−04:00	Schmidt 23'	Report		Stadium: Tim Hortons Field; Attendance: 23,197

== Domestic leagues ==
=== Men ===
==== Major League Soccer ====
Three Canadian teams (Montreal Impact, Toronto FC, and Vancouver Whitecaps FC) play in this league, which also contains seventeen teams from the United States. It is considered a Division 1 league in the Canadian soccer league system.

Overall standings

Pos	Team	Pld	W	L	T	GF	GA	GD	Pts	
1	New York Red Bulls (S)	34	18	10	6	62	43	+19	60	Qualification for the CONCACAF Champions League
2	FC Dallas	34	18	10	6	52	39	+13	60	Qualification for the CONCACAF Champions League
3	Vancouver Whitecaps FC (V)	34	16	13	5	45	36	+9	53	Qualification for the CONCACAF Champions League
4	Columbus Crew SC	34	15	11	8	58	53	+5	53	
5	Portland Timbers (C)	34	15	11	8	41	39	+2	53	Qualification for the CONCACAF Champions League
6	Seattle Sounders FC	34	15	13	6	44	36	+8	51	
7	Montreal Impact	34	15	13	6	48	44	+4	51	
8	D.C. United	34	15	13	6	43	45	−2	51	
9	LA Galaxy	34	14	11	9	56	46	+10	51	
10	Sporting Kansas City (U)	34	14	11	9	48	45	+3	51	Qualification for the CONCACAF Champions League
11	New England Revolution	34	14	12	8	48	47	+1	50	
12	Toronto FC	34	15	15	4	58	58	0	49	
13	San Jose Earthquakes	34	13	13	8	41	39	+2	47	
14	Orlando City SC	34	12	14	8	46	56	−10	44	
15	Houston Dynamo	34	11	14	9	42	49	−7	42	
16	Real Salt Lake	34	11	15	8	38	48	−10	41	
17	New York City FC	34	10	17	7	49	58	−9	37	
18	Philadelphia Union	34	10	17	7	42	55	−13	37	
19	Colorado Rapids	34	9	15	10	33	43	−10	37	
20	Chicago Fire	34	8	20	6	43	58	−15	30	

Source: MLS
Rules for classification: 1) points; 2) total wins; 3) total goal differential; 4) total goals scored
(C) MLS Cup champions; (S) Supporters' Shield winners; (U) U.S. Open Cup winners; (V) Canadian Championship winners

==== North American Soccer League ====
Two Canadian teams (FC Edmonton and Ottawa Fury FC) play in this league, which also contains nine teams from the United States. It is considered a Division 2 league in the Canadian soccer league system.

Overall standings

Pos	Team	Pld	W	D	L	GF	GA	GD	Pts	Qualification
1	New York Cosmos (C, X)	30	15	11	4	49	30	+19	56	Championship qualifiers (Note: As spring season champions)
2	Ottawa Fury	30	15	11	4	42	23	+19	56	Championship qualifiers (Note: As fall season champions)
3	Minnesota United	30	14	11	5	54	39	+15	53	Championship qualifiers (Note: As next best teams in overall standings)
4	Fort Lauderdale Strikers	30	11	8	11	49	40	+9	41	Championship qualifiers
5	Tampa Bay Rowdies	30	10	9	11	33	37	−4	39	
6	Carolina RailHawks	30	9	8	13	44	49	−5	35	
7	FC Edmonton	30	9	8	13	41	46	−5	35	
8	Atlanta Silverbacks	30	7	12	11	31	40	−9	33	
9	Indy Eleven	30	8	9	13	36	48	−12	33	
10	San Antonio Scorpions	30	7	10	13	41	52	−11	31	
11	Jacksonville Armada	30	8	7	15	33	49	−16	31	

Source: NASL
Rules for classification: 1) points; 2) total goal differential; 3) total goals scored; 4) head-to-head record; 5) away goal differential; 6) away goals scored
(C) Champions; (X) Regular season champion

==== United Soccer League ====
Three Canadian teams (FC Montreal, Toronto FC II, and Whitecaps FC 2) play in this league, which also contains 21 teams from the United States. It is considered a Division 3 league in the Canadian soccer league system.

Eastern Conference

Pos	Team	Pld	W	D	L	GF	GA	GD	Pts	Qualification
1	Rochester Rhinos (C, X)	28	17	10	1	40	15	+25	61	Conference semi-finals
2	Louisville City FC	28	14	6	8	55	34	+21	48	Conference semi-finals
3	Charleston Battery	28	12	10	6	43	28	+15	46	First round
4	New York Red Bulls II	28	12	6	10	46	45	+1	42	First round
5	Pittsburgh Riverhounds	28	11	8	9	53	42	+11	41	First round
6	Richmond Kickers	28	10	11	7	41	35	+6	41	First round
7	Charlotte Independence	28	10	10	8	38	35	+3	40	
8	Harrisburg City Islanders	28	11	6	11	49	53	−4	39	
9	Saint Louis FC	28	8	9	11	30	40	−10	33	
10	FC Montreal	28	8	4	16	32	46	−14	28	
11	Toronto FC II	28	6	5	17	26	52	−26	23	
12	Wilmington Hammerheads	28	3	10	15	22	42	−20	19	

Source: 2015 USL schedule
Rules for classification: 1) head-to-head; 2) total wins; 3) total goal differential; 4) total goals scored; 5) disciplinary points; 6) away goals scored; 7) away goal differential; 8) home goals scored; 9) home goal differential; 10) coin toss or drawing of lots
(C) Champions; (X) Regular Season League Champion

Western Conference

Pos	Team	Pld	W	D	L	GF	GA	GD	Pts	Qualification
1	Orange County Blues	28	14	5	9	38	34	+4	47	Conference semi-finals
2	Oklahoma City Energy	28	13	8	7	44	36	+8	47	Conference semi-finals
3	Colorado Springs Switchbacks	28	14	4	10	53	35	+18	46	First round
4	Sacramento Republic	28	13	7	8	43	31	+12	46	First round
5	LA Galaxy II	28	14	3	11	39	31	+8	45	First round
6	Seattle Sounders 2	28	13	3	12	45	42	+3	42	First round
7	Tulsa Roughnecks	28	11	6	11	49	46	+3	39	
8	Portland Timbers 2	28	11	2	15	38	45	−7	35	
9	Austin Aztex	28	10	3	15	32	41	−9	33	
10	Arizona United	28	10	2	16	31	55	−24	32	
11	Vancouver Whitecaps 2	28	8	6	14	39	53	−14	30	
12	Real Monarchs	28	7	8	13	32	42	−10	29	

Source: 2015 USL schedule
Rules for classification: 1) head-to-head; 2) total wins; 3) total goal differential; 4) total goals scored; 5) disciplinary points; 6) away goals scored; 7) away goal differential; 8) home goals scored; 9) home goal differential; 10) coin toss or drawing of lots

==== League1 Ontario ====
Twelve teams play in this league, all of which are based in Canada. It is considered a Division 3 league in the Canadian soccer league system.

Pos	Team	Pld	W	D	L	GF	GA	GD	Pts	Qualification
1	Oakville Blue Devils (C)	22	17	2	3	57	18	+39	53	Inter-Provincial Cup
2	Woodbridge Strikers (X)	22	15	2	5	44	16	+28	47	
3	Vaughan Azzurri	22	12	7	3	55	22	+33	43	
4	Sigma FC	22	12	6	4	62	33	+29	42	
5	Toronto FC Academy	22	13	1	8	61	37	+24	40	
6	ANB Futbol	22	12	3	7	50	28	+22	39	
7	Durham United FC	22	11	3	8	44	29	+15	36	
8	Windsor Stars	22	7	6	9	39	43	−4	27	
9	Kingston Clippers	22	4	6	12	33	50	−17	18	
10	ProStars FC	22	4	3	15	24	78	−54	15	
11	Sanjaxx Lions	22	3	0	19	14	66	−52	9	
12	Master's FA	22	1	3	18	20	83	−63	6	

Source: http://www.league1ontario.com/page/standings
(C) Champions; (X) L1 Cup winner

==== Première Ligue de soccer du Québec ====
Seven teams play in this league, all of which are based in Canada. It is considered a Division 3 league in the Canadian soccer league system.

Pos	Team	Pld	W	D	L	GF	GA	GD	Pts	Qualification
1	CS Mont-Royal Outremont	18	11	3	4	44	24	+20	36	Inter-Provincial Cup vs L1O Champion
2	Lakeshore FC	18	10	5	3	36	21	+15	35	
3	AS Blainville	18	8	6	4	32	26	+6	30	
4	CS Longueuil	18	7	5	6	27	28	−1	26	
5	Ottawa Fury FC Academy	18	6	0	12	23	32	−9	18	
6	FC L'Assomption-Lanaudière	18	5	2	11	32	41	−9	17	
7	FC Gatineau	18	4	3	11	24	46	−22	15	

Source: Publication Sports

Pos	Team	Pld	W	D	L	GF	GA	GD	Pts
1	CS Longueuil Reserves	18	11	3	4	41	25	+16	36
2	CS Mont-Royal Outremont Reserves	18	10	4	4	49	29	+20	34
3	AS Blainville Reserves	18	9	4	5	43	34	+9	31
4	FC L'Assomption-Lanaudière Reserves	18	10	1	7	42	43	−1	31
5	FC Gatineau Reserves	18	5	2	11	22	39	−17	17
6	Ottawa Fury FC Academy Reserves	18	4	4	10	21	32	−11	16
7	Lakeshore FC Reserves	18	5	0	13	29	45	−16	15

Source: http://www.tsisports.ca/soccer/archiveLigue/l_classam.aspx

==== Canadian Soccer League ====
Twenty two teams play in this league, all of which are based in Canada. It is a Non-FIFA league previously sanctioned by the Canadian Soccer Association and is now a member of the Soccer Federation of Canada (SFC).

First Division

Pos	Team	Pld	W	D	L	GF	GA	GD	Pts	Qualification
1	Serbian White Eagles (A, C)	22	16	4	2	52	17	+35	52	Qualification for Playoffs
2	Toronto Croatia (A, O)	22	15	3	4	57	18	+39	48	Qualification for Playoffs
3	York Region Shooters (A)	22	13	1	8	56	35	+21	40	Qualification for Playoffs
4	SC Waterloo Region (A)	21	11	3	7	34	27	+7	36 (Note: One match between SC Waterloo Region and Niagara United not played)	Qualification for Playoffs
5	Toronto Atomic FC (A)	22	10	2	10	23	37	−14	32	Qualification for Playoffs
6	Burlington SC (A)	22	8	3	11	41	44	−3	27	Qualification for Playoffs
7	Milton SC (A)	22	8	3	11	32	43	−11	27	Qualification for Playoffs
8	London City (A)	22	8	2	12	31	46	−15	26	Qualification for Playoffs
9	Brampton United	22	7	5	10	31	33	−2	26	
10	Scarborough SC	22	6	8	8	32	49	−17	26	
11	Brantford Galaxy	22	7	3	12	32	44	−12	24	
12	Niagara United	21	2	3	16	23	71	−48	9	

Updated to match(es) played on October 4, 2015. Source: []
Rules for classification: 1) points; 2) goal difference; 3) number of goals scored.
(A) Advance to a further round; (C) Champions; (O) Play-off winners
Notes:

Second Division

Pos	Team	Pld	W	D	L	GF	GA	GD	Pts	Qualification
1	SC Waterloo Region B (A, C)	18	10	6	2	58	23	+35	36	Qualification for Playoffs
2	York Region Shooters B (A)	18	11	1	6	45	37	+8	34	Qualification for Playoffs
3	Milton SC B (A, O)	18	9	5	4	44	31	+13	32	Qualification for Playoffs
4	Burlington SC B (A)	18	9	3	6	34	34	0	30	Qualification for Playoffs
5	Brantford Galaxy B (A)	18	9	1	8	36	33	+3	28	Qualification for Playoffs
6	Toronto Atomic FC B (A)	18	7	3	8	42	39	+3	24	Qualification for Playoffs
7	Niagara United B (A)	18	6	5	7	38	37	+1	23	Qualification for Playoffs
8	Serbian White Eagles B (A)	18	5	4	9	31	62	−31	19	Qualification for Playoffs
9	Toronto Croatia B	18	4	2	12	35	57	−22	14	
10	Brampton United B	18	3	4	11	27	37	−10	13	

Updated to match(es) played on October 5, 2015. Source: http://canadiansoccerleague.ca/2015-2nd-division-standings/
Rules for classification: 1) points; 2) goal difference; 3) number of goals scored.
(A) Advance to a further round; (C) Champions; (O) Play-off winners

=== Women ===
==== National Women's Soccer League ====
No Canadian teams play in this league, though eleven players from the Canada women's national soccer team play on its teams. It is considered a Division 1 league in the Canadian soccer league system.

Overall standings

Pos	Team	Pld	W	D	L	GF	GA	GD	Pts	Qualification
1	Seattle Reign FC	20	13	4	3	41	21	+20	43	NWSL Shield
2	Chicago Red Stars	20	8	9	3	31	22	+9	33	NWSL Playoffs
3	FC Kansas City (C)	20	9	5	6	32	20	+12	32	NWSL Playoffs
4	Washington Spirit	20	8	6	6	31	28	+3	30	NWSL Playoffs
5	Houston Dash	20	6	6	8	21	26	−5	24	
6	Portland Thorns FC	20	6	5	9	27	29	−2	23	
7	Western New York Flash	20	6	5	9	24	34	−10	23	
8	Sky Blue FC	20	5	7	8	22	28	−6	22	
9	Boston Breakers	20	4	3	13	22	43	−21	15	

Source: NWSL
Rules for classification: Tiebreakers
(C) Champions

==== W-League ====
Two Canadian teams (Laval Comets and Quebec Dynamo ARSQ) play in this league, which also contains sixteen teams from the United States. It is considered a Division 2 league in the Canadian soccer league system.

Northeastern Conference

Pos	Team	Pld	W	D	L	GF	GA	GD	Pts	Qualification
1	Laval Comets	12	9	1	2	32	11	+21	28	2015 Championship Host
2	Quebec Dynamo ARSQ	12	8	2	2	22	12	+10	26	2015 Playoff Team
3	Long Island Rough Riders	12	6	2	4	24	15	+9	20	
4	North Jersey Valkyries	12	3	3	6	19	28	−9	10	
5	New Jersey Wildcats	12	3	1	8	13	30	−17	10	
6	New York Magic	12	1	3	8	16	30	−14	5	

Source: wleaguesoccer.com

Semi-finals

July 24, 2015
5:00pm EDT

(Washington, D.C.) Washington Spirit Reserves	1–0	Quebec Dynamo ARSQ
Aedo 39'; Stobbs (yellow card) 68'	Report	Vandal (yellow card) 39' (red card) 76'; Gauthier (yellow card) 45+'

Desjardins Stadium
Laval, Québec

July 24, 2015
7:30pm EDT

Colorado Pride	4–0	(Quebec) Laval Comets
Jerman 31'; Watt 42'; Andrews 45+'; O'breham 57' (o.g.)	Report	Charron-Delage (yellow card) 63'

Desjardins Stadium
Laval, Québec

Third place Playoff

July 26, 2015
12:00pm EDT

(Quebec) Laval Comets	2–0	Quebec Dynamo ARSQ
Maranda 4'; Laverdiere 76'; Busque (yellow card) 90+'	Report	Levasseur (yellow card) 13'

Desjardins Stadium
Laval, Québec

==== League1 Ontario ====
Seven teams play in this league, all of which are based in Canada. It is considered a Division 3 league in the Canadian soccer league system.

Pos	Team	Pld	W	D	L	GF	GA	GD	Pts	Notes
1	Durham United FC	18	14	2	2	69	8	+61	44	2015 L1O Women's Division champion
2	Woodbridge Strikers	18	13	2	3	53	22	+31	41	
3	Vaughan Azzurri	18	10	5	3	50	21	+29	35	
4	North Mississauga SC	18	8	3	7	25	22	+3	27	
5	ANB Futbol	18	4	1	13	25	70	−45	13	
6	Sanjaxx Lions	18	3	2	13	17	58	−41	11	
7	Pro Stars FC	18	2	3	13	13	51	−38	9	

Source: http://www.league1ontario.com/page/standings

== Domestic Cups ==
=== Men ===
==== Canadian Championship ====
The Canadian Championship is contested by men's teams at the division 1 & 2 level.

Preliminary round
FC Edmonton	3	3	6
Ottawa Fury FC	1	1	2

Semifinals
1	Vancouver Whitecaps FC	1	2	3
4	FC Edmonton	1	1	2
2	Toronto FC	0	3	3
3	Montreal Impact (a)	1	2	3

Final
1	Vancouver Whitecaps FC	2	2	4
3	Montreal Impact	2	0	2

==== Inter-Provincial Cup ====
The Inter-Provincial Cup is a two-legged home-and-away series at the division 3 level played between the season champions of League1 Ontario and the Première Ligue de soccer du Québec.

1 November 2015	Oakville Blue Devils (Ontario)	3 - 1	(Quebec) CS Mont-Royal Outremont	Vaughan, Ontario
13:30 UTC−05:00	Wason 4', 36'; Ellis 65'	Report	Dagrou 20'	Stadium: Ontario Soccer Centre

14 November 2015	CS Mont-Royal Outremont (Quebec)	2 - 2	(Ontario) Oakville Blue Devils	Terrebonne, Quebec
18:00 UTC−05:00	Sissoko 28'; Ritchie-Andy 36'	Report	Mitchell 55'; Novak 85'	Stadium: Complexes Sportifs Terrebonne

(Ontario) Oakville Blue Devils win 5–3 on aggregate.

==== Challenge Trophy ====
The Challenge Trophy is a national cup contested by men's teams at the division 4 level and below.

October 12, 2015	London Marconi (Ontario)	2 - 1 (a.e.t.)	(Alberta) Edmonton Scottish	Calgary, Alberta
1:00 pm	Ivanovich 18', 115' (pen.)		Lam 82' (pen.)	Stadium: Calgary Soccer Centre AT2

=== Women ===
==== Jubilee Trophy ====
The Jubilee Trophy is a national cup contested by women's teams at the division 4 level and below.

October 12, 2015	Edmonton Victoria (Alberta)	2 - 1	(Quebec) Royal Sélect Beauport	Calgary, Alberta
10:30 am	Miller; Lund	Report	Bourgoing	Stadium: Calgary Soccer Centre AT2

== Canadian clubs in international competition ==
=== 2014–15 CONCACAF Champions League ===
24 February 2015 Quarterfinals	(Mexico) Pachuca	2 - 2	(Canada) Montreal Impact	Pachuca, Mexico
22:00 UTC−05:00	Olvera 57'; Nahuelpán 68'	Report	Duka 25', 53'	Stadium: Estadio Hidalgo; Referee: John Pitti (Panama)

3 March 2015 Quarterfinals	(Canada) Montreal Impact	1 - 1 (3a - 3 agg.)	(Mexico) Pachuca	Montreal, Canada
20:00 UTC−05:00	Porter 90+3'	Report	Cano 80' (pen.)	Stadium: Olympic Stadium; Attendance: 38,104; Referee: Henry Bejarano (Costa Rica)

18 March 2015 Semifinals	(Canada) Montreal Impact	2 - 0	(Costa Rica) Alajuelense	Montreal, Canada
20:00 UTC−04:00	Piatti 9'; Cabrera 14'	Report		Stadium: Olympic Stadium; Attendance: 33,675; Referee: Jair Marrufo (United States)

7 April 2015 Semifinals	(Costa Rica) Alajuelense	4 - 2 (4 - 4a agg.)	(Canada) Montreal Impact	Alajuela, Costa Rica
22:00 UTC−06:00	Gabas 47', 61'; Guevara 79'; McDonald 90+3'	Report	McInerney 42'; Romero 72'	Stadium: Estadio Alejandro Morera Soto; Attendance: 17,895; Referee: Joel Aguilar (El Salvador)

22 April 2015 Final	(Mexico) América	1 - 1	(Canada) Montreal Impact	Mexico City, Mexico
21:00 UTC−05:00	Peralta 88'	Report	Piatti 16'	Stadium: Estadio Azteca; Attendance: 56,783; Referee: Héctor Rodríguez (Honduras)

29 April 2015 Final	(Canada) Montreal Impact	2 - 4 (3 - 5 agg.)	(Mexico) América	Montreal, Canada
22:00 UTC−04:00	Romero 8'; McInerney 88'	Report	Benedetto 50', 67', 81'; Peralta 65'	Stadium: Olympic Stadium; Attendance: 61,004; Referee: Henry Bejarano (Costa Rica)

(Canada) Montreal Impact finishes in second place.

=== 2015-16 CONCACAF Champions League ===
5 August 2015 Group stage	(Canada) Vancouver Whitecaps FC	1 - 1	(United States) Seattle Sounders FC	Vancouver, Canada
19:00 UTC−07:00	Parker 61'	Report	Neagle 71'	Stadium: BC Place; Referee: Luis Enrique Santander (Mexico)

16 September 2015 Group stage	(Canada) Vancouver Whitecaps FC	1 - 0	(Honduras) Olimpia	Vancouver, Canada
19:00 UTC−07:00	Froese 42'	Report		Stadium: BC Place; Referee: Jeffrey Solís (Costa Rica)

23 September 2015 Group stage	(United States) Seattle Sounders FC	3 - 0	(Canada) Vancouver Whitecaps FC	Seattle, United States
19:00 UTC−07:00	Neagle 32', 47'; Barrett 39'	Report		Stadium: CenturyLink Field; Attendance: 37,624; Referee: Fernando Guerrero (Mexico)

22 October 2015 Group stage	(Honduras) Olimpia	1 - 0	(Canada) Vancouver Whitecaps FC	Tegucigalpa, Honduras
21:00 UTC−05:00	Martínez 69'	Report		Stadium: Estadio Tiburcio Carias Andino; Referee: Trevor Taylor (Barbados)

(Canada) Vancouver Whitecaps FC eliminated in the group stage.
