= Colorado Rush Women =

American women's soccer team

Colorado Rush
- Full name: Colorado Rush
- Founded: 2010
- President/CEO: Tim Schulz
- League: Women's Premier Soccer League
- 2022: 5th, Rockies Division
- Website: https://www.coloradorush.com/wpsl

The Senior Colorado women's Rush Team is a women's football team based in Littleton, Colorado. In the recent past, the team competed in the Rockies Division of the Mountain Conference of the Women's Premier Soccer League's (WPSL) Central Region. It suspended play after the 2022 WPSL season and was succeeded as the Rush Soccer WPSL club in Colorado by Flatirons Rush SC, based in Arvada, Colorado. Colorado Rush's youth teams and academy continue to operate under the name.

== History ==
The Colorado Rush parent organization's history dates back to 1997, when Club Columbine and Lakewood United Soccer Club announced that they were merging.

Colorado Rush founded its senior women's team in 2010 to play in the USL W-League, becoming the Denver-area successor to the unaffiliated Real Colorado Cougars, which had folded after the 2009 season. The W-League disbanded in November 2015. Colorado Rush, which continued operating as youth teams and an academy, re-established a senior side in 2020 to compete in the WPSL but were unable to compete until the 2021 due to the impact of the COVID-19 pandemic on sports. After finishing 5th in its division in the 2022 WPSL season, the team did not compete in the 2023 season.

== Players ==
Lindsey Horan, who played as a midfielder for the Rush's men's and W-League teams in lieu of playing high school soccer, became the first pre-collegiate American women's soccer player to sign a professional contract with an overseas club when she agreed to terms with French club Paris Saint-Germain in 2012.

Tess Boade played for the team in 2015 and 2016.

=== 2022 roster ===
As of July 1, 2022

Note: Flags indicate national team as defined under FIFA eligibility rules; some limited exceptions apply. Players may hold more than one non-FIFA nationality.

No.	Pos.	Nation	Player
1	GK		Halle Mackiewicz
2	MF		Avery Jess Ott
3	DF		Carli Dare
4	DF		Sydney Cheesman
5	MF		Kylie Smith
6	MF		Hannah Dawbarn
8	MF		Kacie Laurie
9	FW		Kayla Meyer
9	FW		Kaylie Chambers
10	MF		Peyton Nourse
11	FW		Isa Winton
12	FW		Camryn MacMillan
14	MF		Lia Zavalsky
14	MF		Sara Spaulding
18	GK		Payton Mulberry
—	DF		Camille Kollar

No.	Pos.	Nation	Player
—	DF		Devan McSwain
—	DF		Emily Goodson
—	DF		Sophia Nickel
—	DF		Zoe Whiddon
—	FW		Morgan Huff
—	FW		Paige Foa
—	FW		Reese Clem
—	FW		Taite DeLange
—	GK		Alexis Stevens
—	GK		Shweta Raje
—	MF		Courtney Moore
—	MF		Hannah Arnold
—	MF		Jocelin Zimmerer
—	MF		Marley Chappel
—	MF		Riley MacDonald
—	MF		Sophia Whiddon

== Year-by-year ==
Colorado Rush results, by season
Year	Div.	League	Reg. Season								Playoffs
Year	Div.	League	Pld.	W	D	L	GF	GA	Pts.	Pos.	Playoffs
2010	2	USL W-League	10	2	6	2	10	12	12	4rd, Western	Did not qualify
2011	2	USL W-League	14	6	3	5	19	18	21	4th, Western	Did not qualify
2012	2	USL W-League	14	5	5	4	18	19	20	3rd, Western	Did not qualify
2013	2	USL W-League	12	0	3	9	13	29	3	7th, Western	Did not qualify
2014	2	USL W-League	12	6	3	3	38	14	21	4th, Western	Did not qualify
2015	2	USL W-League	12	8	3	1	34	15	25	3rd, Western	Did not qualify
2021	2	WPSL	9	5	3	1	33	15	18	2nd, Mountain	Did not qualify
2022	2	WPSL	9	4	1	4	14	18	7	5th, Rockies	Did not qualify
