= 2010 USL W-League season =

USL W-League
- Season: 2010
- Champions: Buffalo Flash (1st Title)
- Regular Season title: Hudson Valley Quickstrike Lady Blues (2nd Title)
- Matches: 163
- Goals: 487 (2.99 per match)

The 2010 W-League Season was the league's 16th. The regular season began in May and ended in July. The playoffs began in late July and ended in August.

== Changes from 2009 season ==
=== Name Changes ===
Two teams changed their name in the off-season:

Team name	Metro area	Previous name
Santa Clarita Blue Heat	Los Angeles area	Ventura County Fusion
Washington Freedom Futures	Washington, D.C. area	Washington Freedom Reserves

=== Expansion Teams ===
Three teams were added for the season:

Team name	Metro area	Location	Previous affiliation
Colorado Rush	Denver area	Denver, CO	expansion
New Jersey Rangers	North Jersey area	Denville, NJ	expansion
North Jersey Valkyries	North Jersey area	Wayne, NJ	expansion

=== Teams Leaving ===
10 teams folded or left the league after the 2009 season:

- Boston Renegades
- Cary Lady Clarets
- Connecticut Passion
- FC Indiana
- Fort Wayne Fever
- Los Angeles Legends
- Minnesota Lightning
- Real Colorado Cougars
- Richmond Kickers Destiny
- Western Mass Lady Pioneers

== Standings ==
Orange indicates W-League title and bye into W-League semifinals.
Purple indicates division title clinched
Green indicates playoff berth clinched
Yellow indicates team would qualify for playoffs in current position
Red indicates team is eliminated from playoffs

=== Central Conference ===
==== Great Lakes Division ====
Pos	Team	Pld	W	L	T	GF	GA	GD	Pts
1	Ottawa Fury Women	12	8	1	3	25	5	+20	27
2	Toronto Lady Lynx	12	7	2	3	15	6	+9	24
3	Laval Comets	12	6	3	3	17	10	+7	21
4	Quebec City Amiral SC	12	6	4	2	16	12	+4	20
5	Rochester Ravens	12	2	9	1	8	24	−16	7
6	Hamilton Avalanche	12	1	11	0	5	29	−24	3

==== Midwest Division ====
Pos	Team	Pld	W	L	T	GF	GA	GD	Pts
1	Buffalo Flash	12	10	0	2	48	5	+43	32
2	Chicago Red Eleven	12	8	2	2	32	8	+24	26
3	Kalamazoo Outrage	12	4	7	1	18	26	−8	13
4	Cleveland Internationals Women	12	3	8	1	16	39	−23	10
5	London Gryphons	12	1	9	2	6	25	−19	5

=== Eastern Conference ===
==== Atlantic Division ====
Pos	Team	Pld	W	L	T	GF	GA	GD	Pts
1	Atlanta Silverbacks Women	10	7	2	1	22	7	+15	22
2	Charlotte Lady Eagles	10	5	3	2	15	4	+11	17
3	Tampa Bay Hellenic	10	5	4	1	12	13	−1	16
4	Hampton Roads Piranhas	10	2	6	2	7	21	−14	8
5	Northern Virginia Majestics	10	2	8	0	6	25	−19	6

==== Northeast Division ====
Pos	Team	Pld	W	L	T	GF	GA	GD	Pts
1	Hudson Valley Quickstrike Lady Blues	12	11	1	0	26	9	+17	33
2	Washington Freedom Futures	12	10	1	1	29	7	+22	31
3	New Jersey Wildcats	12	7	4	1	22	16	+6	22
4	Long Island Rough Riders	12	7	5	0	23	14	+9	21
5	New Jersey Rangers	12	4	8	0	16	30	−14	12
6	New York Magic	12	3	9	0	23	30	−7	9
7	North Jersey Valkyries	12	0	12	0	5	30	−25	0

=== Western Conference ===
Pos	Team	Pld	W	L	T	GF	GA	GD	Pts
1	Vancouver Whitecaps Women	10	6	0	4	20	9	+11	22
2	Pali Blues	10	3	4	3	16	14	+2	12
3	Seattle Sounders Women	10	2	2	6	12	12	0	12
4	Colorado Rush	10	2	2	6	10	12	−2	12
5	Santa Clarita Blue Heat	10	2	6	2	6	16	−10	8
6	Colorado Force	10	2	3	5	11	12	−1	7 (Note: Colorado Force deducted 4 points)

== Playoffs ==
=== Format ===
The W-League champion will earn an automatic bye into the W-League Semifinals, with the highest-placed team in the division not making the playoffs will earn a playoff berth.

The Central Conference will have 5 playoff spots. The second and third place teams from the Great Lakes Division will play each other. The winner will play the Midwest Division champions, while the Great Lakes Division champion will play the second place team of the Midwest Division. The winners of those games will play to determine the conference champion. The Eastern Conference division champions will play the second place team of the opposite division, the winners facing off to determine who goes to the W-League Semifinals. The Western Conference will have their top two teams facing off to determine their conference champion.

The W-League Semifinals will put the regular season champion against the lowest seeded conference champion, and the higher-ranked conference champions against each other. The winners of these games will play in the championship.

=== Conference Brackets ===
Central Conference

Central Divisional Round
GL2	(Ontario) Toronto Lady Lynx	2
GL3	(Quebec) Laval Comets	0

Central Semifinals
MW1	(New York (state)) Buffalo Flash	3
GL2	(Ontario) Toronto Lady Lynx	0
GL1	(Ontario) Ottawa Fury Women	2
MW2	(Illinois) Chicago Red Eleven	0

Central Championship
MW1	(New York (state)) Buffalo Flash	1
GL1	(Ontario) Ottawa Fury Women	0

Eastern Conference

Eastern Semifinals
AT1	(Georgia (U.S. state)) Atlanta Silverbacks Women	5
NE2	New Jersey Wildcats	1
NE1	(Washington, D.C.) Washington Freedom Futures	2 (5)
AT2	(North Carolina) Charlotte Lady Eagles (AET/PSO)	2 (6)

Eastern Championship
AT1	(Georgia (U.S. state)) Atlanta Silverbacks Women	1
AT2	(North Carolina) Charlotte Lady Eagles	0

Western Conference

Western Finals
W1	(British Columbia) Vancouver Whitecaps Women	2
W2	(California) Pali Blues	1

=== W-League Championship Bracket ===
W-League Semifinals
MW1	(New York (state)) Buffalo Flash	3
AT1	(Georgia (U.S. state)) Atlanta Silverbacks Women	1
WL	(New York (state)) Hudson Valley Quickstrike Lady Blues	1
W1	(British Columbia) Vancouver Whitecaps Women	3

W-League Championship
MW1	(New York (state)) Buffalo Flash	3
W1	(British Columbia) Vancouver Whitecaps Women	1
W-League Third Place
WL	(New York (state)) Hudson Valley Quickstrike Lady Blues	3
AT1	(Georgia (U.S. state)) Atlanta Silverbacks Women	0

=== Divisional Round ===
July 21, 2010
3:30 PM EDT

(Ontario) Toronto Lady Lynx	2–0	(Quebec) Laval Comets
Puopolo 12'; Mottershead 25'; Oduro (yellow card) 80'	(Report)	Pinard (yellow card) 88'

Centennial Park Stadium
Toronto, ON
Attendance: 50
Referee: Ihor Bokiy(CAN)

=== Conference semifinals ===
July 23, 2010
5:00 PM EDT

(Washington, D.C.) Washington Freedom Futures	2 – 2 (a.e.t.)	(North Carolina) Charlotte Lady Eagles
Lenczyk 69'; Velaj 109'		Bellingham 81' 120'
Penalties
Penalty scored Penalty missed	5–6	(penalty scored) (penalty missed) (penalty scored) (penalty missed) (penalty scored) (penalty scored) (penalty scored); (penalty scored) Lyle

RE/MAX Greater Atlanta Stadium
Atlanta, GA
Referee: Tony Russo (USA)

July 23, 2010
7:30 PM EDT

(Georgia (U.S. state)) Atlanta Silverbacks Women	5–1	New Jersey Wildcats
Frierson 22' 38'; Tomlinson 45'; Newfield 69'; Harbrueger 81' (yellow card) 84'	(Report)	Brandao 71'

RE/MAX Greater Atlanta Stadium
Atlanta, GA
Referee: Amy Mahan (USA)

July 24, 2010
5:30 PM EDT

(New York (state)) Buffalo Flash	3–0	(Ontario) Toronto Lady Lynx
Boquete 20' 41'; Parker 69'	(Report)	Afonso (yellow card) 28'

Niagara Field
Lewiston, NY
Attendance: 125
Referee: John Safar (USA)

July 24, 2010
8:00 PM EDT

(Ontario) Ottawa Fury Women	2–0	(Illinois) Chicago Red Eleven
Evans 11' (yellow card) 71'; Hearn 45'; Taylor (yellow card) 67'	(Report)	Kabellis (yellow card) 90'

Niagara Field
Lewiston, NY
Attendance: 75
Referee: Pat Road (USA)

=== Conference finals ===
July 24, 2010
7:30 PM EDT

(Georgia (U.S. state)) Atlanta Silverbacks Women	1–0	(North Carolina) Charlotte Lady Eagles
Garman (yellow card) 41'; Powell 44'	(Report)

RE/MAX Greater Atlanta Stadium
Atlanta, GA
Referee: Veronica Brito (USA)

July 24, 2010
7:00 PM PDT

(British Columbia) Vancouver Whitecaps Women	2–1	(California) Pali Blues
Tancredi 35'; Vermeulen 41'; Zurrer (yellow card) 68'; Kyle (yellow card) 90'	(Report)	Shaner (yellow card) 58'; Gama 61'

Swangard Stadium
Burnaby, BC
Attendance: 1,712
Referee: Michelle Pye (CAN)

July 25, 2010
6:00 PM EDT

(New York (state)) Buffalo Flash	1–0	(Ontario) Ottawa Fury Women
Parker 20'; Boquete (yellow card) 83'	(Report)	Romagnuolo (yellow card) 57'; Wetzel (yellow card) 89' (yellow-red card) 90+'

Niagara Field
Lewiston, NY
Attendance: 155
Referee: Steve Montanino (USA)

=== W-League Semifinals ===
July 29, 2010
2:00 PM PDT

(New York (state)) Buffalo Flash	3–1	(Georgia (U.S. state)) Atlanta Silverbacks Women
Hammond 18'; Parker 53' 81'	(Report)	Powell 36'

Harry Welch Stadium
Santa Clarita, CA
Referee: Magic Berenji (USA)

July 29, 2010
5:00 PM PDT

(New York (state)) Hudson Valley Quickstrike Lady Blues	1–3	(British Columbia) Vancouver Whitecaps Women
Edmonds (yellow card) 57'; Gabi Zanotti 85'	(Report)	Kyle 4'; Franko 13'; Stewart (yellow card) 57'; Booth 76'

Harry Welch Stadium
Santa Clarita, CA
Attendance: 302
Referee: Ryan Van Dyne (USA)

=== W-League Third Place ===
July 31, 2010
12:30 PM PDT

(New York (state)) Hudson Valley Quickstrike Lady Blues	3–0	(Georgia (U.S. state)) Atlanta Silverbacks Women
Gabi Zanotti; Acevedo	(Report)

Harry Welch Stadium
Santa Clarita, CA
Referee: (USA)

=== W-League Championship ===
July 31, 2010
4:00 PM PDT

(New York (state)) Buffalo Flash	3–1	(British Columbia) Vancouver Whitecaps Women
Davison 61'; Boquete 64' 88'	(Report)	Vermeulen (yellow card) 53' (goal) 57'

Harry Welch Stadium
Santa Clarita, CA
Attendance: 362
Referee: Felisha Mariscal (USA)

== See also ==
- United Soccer Leagues 2010
- 2010 PDL Season
