= 2010 W-League =

2010 W-League might refer to:

- 2010 W-League (Australia)
- 2010 USL W-League season
