= Rochester Ravens =

American soccer team

- Full name: Rochester Ravens
- Founded: 2009
- Dissolved: 2013
- Ground: Wegmans Stadium at the Aquinas Institute of Rochester
- Capacity: 2,500
- Owner: Doug Miller
- League: USL W-League
Home colors	Away colors

The Rochester Ravens were an American women's soccer team which played from 2009 to 2013. The team was a member of the United Soccer Leagues W-League, the second tier of women's soccer in the United States and Canada. The team played in the Great Lakes Division of the Central Conference against teams from Hamilton, Laval, London, Ottawa, Quebec City and Toronto.

The team played its home games at Wegmans Stadium at the Aquinas Institute of Rochester in the city of Rochester, New York and they also played home games at the Capelli Sport Stadium.

The team was the successor to the Rochester Rhinos Women, which was affiliated with the USL First Division team Rochester Rhinos for three years from 2006 through 2008. The original team was founded (as the Ravens) in 1996, and was owned by Jill McCabe, until it was sold to the former Rochester Rhinos ownership of Frank DuRoss, Steve Donner, Chris Economides, Peter Bourne, and Chris Wilmot in late 2005. In 2008, the Rhinos' new owner, Rob Clark, sold the women's USL W-League soccer franchise. The new team was announced on May 1, 2009, by the new owner Doug Miller, former star Rochester Rhinos player. On January 28, 2013, Doug Miller announced that the Ravens will cease operations, stating that with the Western New York Flash once again playing in the top tier of women's soccer there is not a need for a second women's team in a lower league in Rochester.

== Year-by-year ==
- See also: 2003 season
- See also: 2004 season
- See also: 2005 season
- See also: 2006 season
- See also: 2007 season
- See also: 2008 season
- See also: 2009 season
- See also: 2010 season
- See also: 2011 season

Year	League	Division	Regular season	Playoffs
2003	USL W-League	Northern Division	5th	no participation to playoff
2004	USL W-League	North Central Division	3rd	lost in first round
2005	USL W-League	Northern Division	5th	no participation to playoff
2006	USL W-League	Northern Division	6th	no participation to playoff
2007	USL W-League	Northern Division	4th	no participation to playoff
2008	USL W-League	Northern Division	4th	no participation to playoff
2009	USL W-League	Great Lakes Division	8th	no participation to playoff
2010	USL W-League	Great Lakes Division	5th	no participation to playoff
2011	USL W-League	Great Lakes Division	6th	no participation to playoff
