= Victoria Frederick =

American professional soccer player

Personal information
- Full name: Victoria Jean Frederick
- Date of birth: June 23, 1989 (age 37)
- Place of birth: Huntsville, Alabama
- Height: 5 ft 7 in (1.70 m)
- Positions: Midfielder; forward

College career
Years	Team	Apps	(Gls)
2007–2010	Alabama Crimson Tide		

Senior career*
Years	Team	Apps	(Gls)
2010–2012	Seattle Sounders		
2013	Seattle Reign FC	0	(0)
- * Club domestic league appearances and goals

Victoria Jean Frederick (born June 23, 1989) is an American professional soccer midfielder and forward. She has previously played for the Seattle Sounders Women of the USL W-League and the Seattle Reign FC of the National Women's Soccer League (NWSL).

== Early life ==
Frederick attended Huntsville High School in Huntsville, Alabama where she played soccer and was named the Gatorade High School Player of the Year for Alabama and Birmingham News Player of the Year. In 2005, she helped lead the team to a 5A State title. She was named to the Birmingham News 5A All-State team in 2005 and 2006 and the Birmingham News 6A All-State team in 2007. She set a school record for goals scored in a season with 48. Frederick was selected to the Super All-State team in 2005 and 2006, the first team All-Metro in 2005 and 2006, and first-team All-City in 2005 and 2006. She was named Most Valuable Offensive Player in 2006 and 2007.

Frederick was an Olympic Development Program (ODP) national camp participant and played for the ODP Region III team in 2007. She played for the club team, Vestavia Attack, and helped lead Vestavia to a state title in 2005 and 2006.

=== University of Alabama ===
Frederick played for the Alabama Crimson Tide at the University of Alabama from 2007 to 2010 where she was a leading scorer. As a freshman in 2007, she was named to the Southeastern Conference (SEC) All-Freshman Team as well as the SEC Freshmen Academic Honor Roll. She played in 18 games and made 11 starts and tied for the team-lead in points with 13, goals with five and led the team with 32 shots. Frederick was second on the team with five points on two goals and one assist during league play and tallied a team-high 16 shots during conference games. During her second year, Frederick played in 20 games with 20 starts, logging a total of 1,540 minutes. She led the team with 21 shots on goal and ranked second on the squad with 42 shots taken. She was one of four players to lead the team with four assists and tied for third on the team with 10 points. Her three goals were tied for third most on the team.

During her junior year, Frederick started and played in 17 matches, logging 1399 minutes. She led the team with 10 points on four goals and two assists. Her four goals were highest on the team. During the season, she fired off 23 shots and put 11 on frame. She was named to the NSCAA All-South Region Scholar Team and the Red Raider Classic All-Tournament team. As a senior, Frederick started and played in 18 games, logging a total of 1528 minutes and averaged 2.27 shots per game. She tied for a team-high of 14 points and led the team with six assists and 21 shots on goal.

== Club career ==
=== Seattle Sounders Women ===
Frederick signed with the Seattle Sounders Women in 2010. She made two appearances and scored one goal. She returned to the team for the 2012 season and made 14 appearances with the club for a total of 618 minutes and provided one assist.

=== Seattle Reign FC ===
Frederick signed with the Seattle Reign FC for the inaugural season of the NWSL in 2013.
