= Sound FC =

Sound FC may refer to:

- Sound FC (men), an American soccer team based in Tacoma, Washington
- Sound FC (women), an American women's soccer team
