= Carolina Elite Cobras =

- Full name: Carolina Elite Cobras
- Nickname: Cobras
- Founded: 2010
- Stadium: Kroc Community Center; Greenville, South Carolina
- Capacity: 500
- Owner: (United States) Sandy Burris and Lauren Whitt
- Manager: (United States) Sandy Burris
- League: USL W-League
- 2014: 3rd, Southeastern Conference; Playoffs: DNQ
Home colours	Away colours

Carolina Elite Cobras, formerly Central SC Cobras, is an American women's soccer team, founded in 2010. The team is a member of the United Soccer Leagues W-League, the second tier of women's soccer in the United States and Canada.

== History ==
The team played its first season at Younts Soccer Stadium on the campus of Columbia College in Columbia, SC. But, moved to Greenville, SC for the 2013 season. For the 2013 season the Central SC Cobras FC acquired new Sponsoring Partner Carolina Elite Soccer Academy (CESA). Though the franchise is still based out of Columbia it now also works out of Greenville. The addition of Elite to the name was made as part of the sponsoring agreement so Central SC Cobras -Carolina Cobras - Carolina Elite Cobras was the evolution as things began to change after the 2012 season. The team will play the majority of their home games at MESA Soccer Complex in Greenville. The team moved to the soccer field at the Kroc Community Center in Greenville for the 2015 season.

=== 2012 season ===
In their inaugural season the Central SC Cobras played at Younts Soccer Stadium on the campus of Columbia College in Columbia, SC. The Team finished third in the Southeastern Division of the then Eastern Conference, was voted the USL W-League Rookie Franchise of the year, and Saw Defender Tabitha Padget recognized by making the All Conference Team.

=== 2013 season ===
The Caroline Elite Cobras finished the 2013 season in fourth place in the USL W-League after winning the Southeastern Conference Championship. Cobras defender Blakely Mattern was awarded the USL W-League Defender of the Year Award as well as being named to the USL W-League All-League and All-Conference teams. Goalkeeper Elizabeth "Rose" Hull was nominated for USL W-League Goalkeeper of the Year and was selected to the USL W-League All-Conference team along with defender Ashley Swinehart.

=== 2014 season ===
The Cobras finished third in the Southeastern Conference. They missed qualifying for the conference playoff by one standings point. Blakely Mattern again was named to the All-League and All-Conference teams. Defender Kailey Mattison was named to the All-Southeastern Conference team.

== Year-by-year ==
Year	League	Regular season	Playoffs
2012	W-League	3rd, Southeast Division	Did not qualify
2013	W-League	2nd, Southeastern Conference	League Semifinals
2014	W-League	3rd, Southeastern Conference	Did not qualify
2015	W-League	5th, Southeastern Conference	Did not qualify

== Players ==
The following former players have played at the senior international and/or professional level:

- (Republic of Ireland) Sylvia Gee
