= Anna Maria Picarelli =

American-born Italian footballer (born 1984)

Anna Picarelli
Personal information
- Full name: Anna Maria Picarelli
- Date of birth: November 4, 1984 (age 41)
- Place of birth: Downey, California, United States
- Height: 1.63 m (5 ft 4 in)
- Position: Goalkeeper

College career
Years	Team	Apps	(Gls)
2003–2006	Pepperdine Waves		

Senior career*
Years	Team	Apps	(Gls)
2006–2009	Bardolino Verona		
2009	Los Angeles Legends		
2010	Ajax America Women		
2010	Kristianstads DFF		
2011–2013	Pali Blues		
2014	Seattle Sounders Women		

International career^{‡}
2008–2012	Italy	42	(0)

Managerial career
- 2014–2023: Simon Fraser Red Leafs (assistant)
- * Club domestic league appearances and goals as of 20:13, 17 December 2022 (UTC) ‡ National team caps and goals as of 20:13, 17 December 2022 (UTC)

Anna Maria Picarelli (born November 4, 1984) is an American-born Italian former footballer who played as a goalkeeper for Seattle Sounders Women and the Italian national team.

Picarelli is an Italian American, born in Downey, California; her father Angelo Picarelli and uncle Joe Picarelli both became restaurateurs in Long Beach. Her paternal grandparents Mario and Maria Picarelli had migrated from Calabria to Downey in 1966.

As a senior in her successful four-year career playing varsity soccer at Pepperdine University, Picarelli was called into a training camp for the United States women's national under-23 soccer team. However, coach Jill Ellis quickly deemed Picarelli too small to be an effective goalkeeper at international level.

After graduating Picarelli approached Italian club Bardolino Verona who signed her after a very short trial. She played for Bardolino in a 3–3 UEFA Women's Champions League draw with Arsenal Ladies and caught the eye of Italy women's national football team manager Pietro Ghedin.

In January 2008 Picarelli made her debut for Italy in a 1–0 friendly defeat in France. By the time of UEFA Women's Euro 2009 Picarelli was Italy's first choice goalkeeper; playing in their shock 2–1 win over England, the 2–0 defeat to Sweden, the 2–1 over Russia and the quarter-final defeat to eventual winners Germany.

After Italy's win over England, Picarelli's partner Cameron Thomas made her a marriage proposal inside the Lahti Stadium, which she accepted.

After leaving Bardolino and playing her club football in America, Picarelli continued to be selected by the Italian national team. She played against the country of her birth in the 2011 FIFA Women's World Cup qualification (UEFA–CONCACAF play-off), which Italy lost 2–0 on aggregate. She won a total of 42 caps for Italy.

In July 2014 she was appointed to a role as an assistant college soccer coach with the Simon Fraser Red Leafs, based in Burnaby, British Columbia, Canada.
