= Melissa Busque =

Canadian soccer player

Mélissa Busque
Personal information
- Date of birth: 18 February 1990 (age 36)
- Place of birth: Montreal, Quebec, Canada
- Height: 5 ft 4 in (1.63 m)
- Position: Midfielder

Team information
- Current team: CS Fabrose

Youth career
- 1995–2008: Saint-Bruno

College career
Years	Team	Apps	(Gls)
2008–2010	Connecticut Huskies		
2012	Seattle Redhawks		

Senior career*
Years	Team	Apps	(Gls)
2009–2013	Ottawa Fury	33	(12)
2013–2014	Seattle Sounders	30	(7)
2014	Laval Comets	1	(0)
2014	Herfoder SV	0	(0)
2014	Laval Comets	10	(0)
2015	Sand	0	(0)
2015	Laval Comets	12	(4)
2018	FC Sélect Rive-Sud	10	(1)
2019	CS Fabrose	4	(1)

International career^{‡}
2005	Canada U15	2	(0)
2006	Canada U16	1	(0)
2008–2012	Canada U20	1	(0)
2013	Canada	3	(0)
- * Club domestic league appearances and goals as of 20:39, 7 September 2018 (UTC) ‡ National team caps and goals as of 20:39, 7 September 2018 (UTC)

Mélissa Busque (born 18 February 1990) is a Canadian soccer player.

Busque was born in Montreal, Quebec in Canada and played college soccer with Connecticut Huskies and also played with the Seattle Redhawks. She began her professional career with Ottawa Fury, before moving to Seattle Sounders in 2013. Between 2014 and 2015, Busque has had five spells with three clubs. Firstly joining Laval Comets in 2014, then leaving to sign for German Bundesliga club Herfoder SV before returning to Laval later that year. After spending more time with Laval, Busque was on the move again as she joined another Bundesliga club in Sand. Her spells with both German sides were unsuccessful as she failed to make an appearance for Herforder or Sand before again returning to Laval.

Busque has won three caps with the Canadian national team. She has also played futsal.

== Early life ==
Busque was born in Quebec, Canada. She is the daughter of Rejean Busque and Ginette Blouin. She graduated from the Collège Français Longueuil, before enrolling at the University of Connecticut in 2008 where she studied sports management before leaving to go to Seattle University in 2012 where she studied Psychology.

== Career ==
=== Club ===
==== Youth, 1995–2008 ====
Busque started her career at the age of five with Saint-Bruno. She stayed with Saint-Bruno from 1995 until 2008 when she started college soccer with Connecticut Huskies and Seattle Redhawks. She played with Connecticut from 2008 to 2011 and made a total of sixty-five appearances for the team, whilst scoring ten goals and assisting fourteen. After three strong years with Connecticut, she next moved to the Seattle Redhawks. During her months with Seattle, she made twenty appearances and scored four goals while providing four assists.

==== Ottawa Fury, 2009–2013 ====
Busque joined her first North American W-League team, Ottawa Fury, in 2009 where she remained for three years. During her time with Ottawa, she won 2011 W-League Central Conference and 2011 W-League Central Conference Play-offs but lost in the Championship final 6–1 to Atlanta Silverbacks. She left Ottawa in April 2013, she made thirty-three appearances and scored twelve goals and participated in three division titles, two conference championships, two final four appearances, and played in two championship matches.

==== Seattle Sounders, 2013–2014 ====
On 23 April 2013, Busque joined Seattle Sounders. She had been on trial beforehand and featured in a friendly match against Oregon State Beavers where she impressed Seattle's assistant coach Zahra Lechak. In 2013, she was selected in the USL W-League All-Star team following an online survey. After playing in thirty matches for Seattle and scoring seven goals, Busque moved clubs again as she left Seattle on 1 May 2014.

==== Laval Comets to Herforder and back to Laval, 2014 ====
Following her departure from Seattle, Busque signed for Laval Comets on 1 May 2014 but made just one appearance before leaving for newly promoted German Bundesliga club Herfoder SV on 18 June. However, after delaying her move to the club on numerous occasions the club decided to cancel her contract on 2 August. She failed to make an appearance for Herforder. She rejoined Laval Comets where she made ten appearances before leaving again in 2015.

==== Sand, 2015 ====
2015 was more of the same for Busque as she moved back to the Bundesliga but this time agreed to join Sand in January 2015. Despite spending six months with Sand, Busque didn't make a single appearance for the club and left to rejoin Laval Comets for the third time in her career.

==== Laval Comets, 2015 ====
After returning to Laval for a third time in 2015, Busque made twelve appearances for the club.

==== FC Sélect Rive-Sud, 2018 ====
Busque made a return to soccer in May 2018 by joining Première Ligue de soccer du Québec side FC Sélect Rive-Sud.

==== CS Fabrose, 2019 ====
In 2019, after leaving FC Sélect Rive-Sud, Busque signed with fellow PLSQ team CS Fabrose on a part-time basis.

=== International ===
Throughout her career, Busque has made three senior appearances for the Canada women's national soccer team. Her three caps have come in matches against Germany, South Korea and Mexico. Before making the step up to senior internationals, Busque represented Canada at Under-15, Under-16 and Under-20 level and made seven appearances overall.

== Futsal career ==
Busque featured in the Première Ligue de Futsal du Québec for Xtreme ADR in 2016. In early 2019, Busque played for the Quebec women's futsal team in friendly wins over their Belgium counterparts.

== Career statistics ==
=== Club ===
As of match played 27 October 2015.

Appearances and goals by club, season and competition
Club	Season	League			National Cup (Note: Includes the DFB-Pokal)		Total	
Club	Season	Division	Apps	Goals	Apps	Goals	Apps	Goals
Ottawa Fury	2009–13	W-League	33	12	—		33	12
Total			33	12	—		33	12
Seattle Sounders	2013–14	W-League	30	7	—		30	7
Total			30	7	—		30	7
Laval Comets	2014	W-League	1	0	—		1	0
Total			1	0	—		1	0
Herfoder SV	2014–15	Bundesliga	0	0	0	0	0	0
Total			0	0	0	0	0	0
Laval Comets	2014	W-League	10	0	—		10	0
Total			10	0	—		10	0
Sand	2014–15	Bundesliga	0	0	0	0	0	0
Total			0	0	0	0	0	0
Laval Comets	2015	W-League	12	4	—		12	4
Total			12	4	—		12	4
Career total			86	23	0	0	86	23

=== International ===
As of 4 February 2018.

National team	Season	Apps	Goals
Canada	2013	3	0
Total		3	0

== Honours ==
Busque has won two club honours and one individual honour during her career. She won the 2011 W-League Central Conference and 2011 W-League Central Conference Play-offs with Ottawa Fury. She was selected in the All-Star team in the 2013 W-League season during her time with Seattle Sounders.

=== Club ===
Ottawa Fury

- W-League Central Conference: 2011
- W-League Central Conference Play-offs: 2011

=== Individual ===
Seattle Sounders

- W-League All-Star: 2013
