= Rachel Breton =

American soccer striker and defender

Personal information
- Full name: Rachel Margot Breton
- Date of birth: August 4, 1990 (age 36)
- Place of birth: Kearny, New Jersey, U.S.
- Height: 5 ft 4 in (1.63 m)
- Positions: Striker; defender

Team information
- Current team: Sky Blue FC
- Number: 28

College career
Years	Team	Apps	(Gls)
2008–2009	Villanova Wildcats		
2011	Rutgers Scarlet Knights		

Senior career*
Years	Team	Apps	(Gls)
2009	New Jersey Wildcats		
2013–2015	Sky Blue FC	1	(0)
2015	Amazon Grimstad	6	(0)
- * Club domestic league appearances and goals

Rachel Margot Breton (born August 4, 1990) is an American soccer striker and defender. She previously played for Sky Blue FC and New Jersey Wildcats.

== Club career ==
On May 30, 2013, she was called up from the Sky Blue FC's reserve team into the first team. She made her debut on July 6, 2013, against Washington Spirit. She was described as a "terrific overall athlete who is capable of playing anywhere on the field, strong on the ball and has great quickness."

== Personal life ==
Born in Kearny, New Jersey, Breton grew up in Manalapan Township, New Jersey.

Her father and uncle were also football players.
