= Quebec Dynamo ARSQ =

- Founded: 2008
- Stadium: Collège François-Xavier-Garneau; Quebec City, Quebec
- Capacity: 2000
- Chairman: Denis Poulin
- Manager: Marc Mounicot
- League: USL W-League
- 2015: 2nd, Northeastern; Playoffs: League Semifinals
Home colours	Away colours

Quebec Dynamo ARSQ was a Canadian soccer club, founded in 2008 in the province of Québec. The women’s team is a member of the United Soccer Leagues W-League, the second tier of women’s soccer in the United States and Canada. The team debuted in the Great Lakes Division of the Central Conference against teams from Hamilton, Laval, London, Ottawa, Rochester and Toronto.

The team's colours are black and white. Quebec Dynamo ARSQ play the home games at the Collège François-Xavier-Garneau stadium in Quebec City.

== History ==
Quebec Dynamo ARSQ was founded in 2008 by four promoters: Samir Ghrib, David Desloges, Stéphane Alain and Maxime Barabé. The presentation of team's colors shirts and the nomination of a general manager takes place on September 24, 2009. The new team is consist a non-profit organization from the Association Régionale de Soccer de Québec (ARSQ). The team created to ensure the development of regional soccer in the Quebec city and Chaudière-Appalaches region.

== Name change ==
The original name for the franchise was the Arsenal SC, however, lawyers representing the English club Arsenal F.C. demanded that the team change its name, because they hold exclusive rights for that trademark in Canada. Starting with the 2014 W-League season, the team name was changed from Quebec City Amiral SC to Quebec Dynamo ARSQ. The league ended following the 2015 season, however, the club re-formed in 2018 to play in the Première Ligue de soccer du Québec.

== Rivalries ==
Quebec Dynamo ARSQ have a big rivalry with the Laval Comets. Several former players of Comets play now for the Dynamo. In matches between the two teams, it is not uncommon for supporters to travel Quebec city-Montreal or Montreal-Quebec city to go to encourage their teams.

== Year-by-year ==
Year	League	Division	Regular season	Playoffs
2009	USL W-League	Great Lakes Division	3rd	Did not qualify
2010	USL W-League	Great Lakes Division	4th	no participation to playoff
2011	USL W-League	Great Lakes Division	3rd	lost the Central Conference Championship
2012	USL W-League	Great Lakes Division	2nd	Win Central Conference playoffs and finish 4th at W-League Final Four
2013	USL W-League	Central Conference	5th	Did not qualify
2014	USL W-League	Central Conference	5th	Did not qualify
2015	USL W-League	Northeastern Conference	2nd	Loses in W-League Final Four

== Players ==
=== Squad 2011 ===
Note: Flags indicate national team as defined under FIFA eligibility rules; some limited exceptions apply. Players may hold more than one non-FIFA nationality.

No.	Pos.	Nation	Player
1	GK	CAN	Sarah Boucher
3	DF	CAN	Mélissa Roy
5	MF	CAN	Laura Chénard
7	MF	CAN	Andréanne Gagné
8	DF	CAN	Myriam Bouchard
9	FW	CAN	Léa Chastenay-Joseph
10	MF	CAN	Geneviève Caron
11	DF	CAN	Stéphanie Frenette-Blais
12	FW	CAN	Mélissa Lesage
14	FW	CAN	Josée Bélanger

No.	Pos.	Nation	Player
15	DF	CAN	Arianne Leclerc
16	FW	HAI	Manoucheka Pierre-Louis
17	MF	HAI	Adeline Saintilmond
19	DF	CAN	Frédérique Paradis
20	FW	CAN	Véronique Laverdière
22	GK	CAN	Marie-Pier Bilodeau
23	MF	CAN	Joelle Gosselin
24	FW	CAN	Geneviève Marcotte
25	DF	CAN	Cristina Di Ielsi

== Staff 2013 ==
- Owner: Denis Poulin
- Head Coach: Samir Ghrib

=== Former head coach ===
- (Canada) Fabien Cottin, (2009)
- (Canada) Jonas Worth, (2010)

=== Former assistant coach ===
- (Canada) Christophe Blin, (2012)
- (Canada) Marie-Ève Laflamme, (2009)
- (Brazil) Eduardo Guerra, (2010)
