= Blakely Mattern =

American soccer player

Personal information
- Full name: Blakely Elizabeth Mattern
- Date of birth: September 17, 1988 (age 38)
- Place of birth: Simpsonville, South Carolina, U.S.
- Height: 5 ft 9 in (1.75 m)
- Position: Defender

Team information
- Current team: Carolina Elite Cobras

Youth career
- 2000–2004: CESA
- 2004–2006: JL Mann Patriots

College career
| Years | Team | Apps | (Gls) |
| 2006–2009 | South Carolina Gamecocks | | |

Senior career*
| Years | Team | Apps | (Gls) |
| 2009–2010 | Atlanta Beat | | |
| 2010 | Charlotte Lady Eagles | 5 | (1) |
| 2011–2012 | FC Twente | 4 | (0) |
| 2013– | Carolina Elite Cobras | | |
| 2013– | Mallbackens IF | | |
- * Club domestic league appearances and goals as of 10:03, September 23, 2011 (UTC)

Blakely Elizabeth Mattern (born September 17, 1988) is an American soccer defender who plays for Carolina Elite Cobras.

== Career ==
=== Collegiate ===
Mattern played collegiate soccer at the University of South Carolina where she was a two-time All-American in addition to being a Freshman All-American. In 2009, she was a consensus first team selection after earning All-America nods by the NSCAA, Soccer America and the Lowe's Senior CLASS Organization. She was the 2007 SEC Defensive Player of the Year, becoming the first sophomore in conference history to earn the honor, and is a four-time All-SEC selection. In her final season, she was captain of a defense that was ranked No. 9 in the nation and led the SEC in every defensive category en route to 15 shutouts and a berth in the NCAA Round of 16.

=== Club ===
Mattern was selected by Atlanta Beat as the first choice of the third round and 21st overall selection in the 2010 WPS Draft. She was the Beat's second pick and the fourth defender overall selected in the WPS Draft. In late 2010 she joined the Charlotte Lady Eagles.

In the summer of 2011 Mattern joined FC Twente together with Danielle de Seriere. With Ashley Nick the Dutch club already had an American player. Due to an injury Mattern missed the first couple of matches.

Since 2013 she has played for the Carolina Elite Cobras in the United States and for Mallbackens IF in Sweden.
