= Los Angeles Legends (W-League) =

- Full name: Los Angeles Legends Football Club
- Nickname: The Legends
- Founded: 2008
- Ground: Cougar Stadium
- Capacity: ????
- Chairman: Josh Hodges
- Manager: Twila Kaufman
- League: USL W-League
- 2009: 7th, Western Conference
Home colors	Away colors

Los Angeles Legends was an American women's soccer team, founded in 2008. The team folded after the 2009 season. The team was a member of the United Soccer Leagues W-League, the second tier of women's soccer in the United States and Canada. The team played in the Western Conference against teams from Denver, Fort Collins, Los Angeles, Seattle, Vancouver and Ventura.

The team played its home games at Cougar Stadium on the campus of Azusa Pacific University in the city of Azusa, California, 24 miles east of downtown Los Angeles. The team's colors was black and white.

The team was a sister organization of the men's Los Angeles Legends team, which plays in the USL Premier Development League.

== Players ==
- Head Coach: Twila Kaufman
- Assistant Coach: Kristy Kieley
- Fitness Coach: Ali Malaekah
- Goalkeeper Coach: Chris Swift
- General Manager: Ramon Reid

=== Squad 2009 ===
Note: Flags indicate national team as defined under FIFA eligibility rules; some limited exceptions apply. Players may hold more than one non-FIFA nationality.

No.	Pos.	Nation	Player
00	DF	CAN	Kathryn Maxwell
0	GK	ITA	Anna Maria Picarelli
1	GK	PUR	Alicia Lugo
2	MF	USA	Brianna Kuhne
3	FW	USA	Jessica Murphy
4	DF	USA	Jackie Simon
5	MF	USA	Taylor Cochran
6	MF	USA	Ashley Flateland
7	MF	NOR	Madison Klovstad
8	MF	USA	Erin Brunelle
10	MF	USA	Lauryn Welch
11	FW	USA	Jennifer Williams

No.	Pos.	Nation	Player
13	DF	USA	Erika Wesley
14	FW	USA	Jocelyne Charette
15	DF	MEX	Marlene Sandoval
16	DF	FRA	Amelia Mathis
17	MF	USA	Bria Beardsley
18	MF	UAE	Salma Tarik
19	MF	USA	Jennifer Brewer
21	FW	ARM	Lisa Kevorkian
22	MF	POL	Kylie Doniak
23	MF	USA	Lydia Cook
24	MF	USA	Daelyn Paul
25	DF	USA	Breanna Thornton
26	FW	KEN	Tanya Riggins

== Year-by-year ==
Year	Division	League	Reg. season	Playoffs
2008	1	USL W-League	6th, Western	Did not qualify
2009	2	USL W-League	7th, Western	Did not qualify
