= Kinley McNicoll =

Canadian soccer player

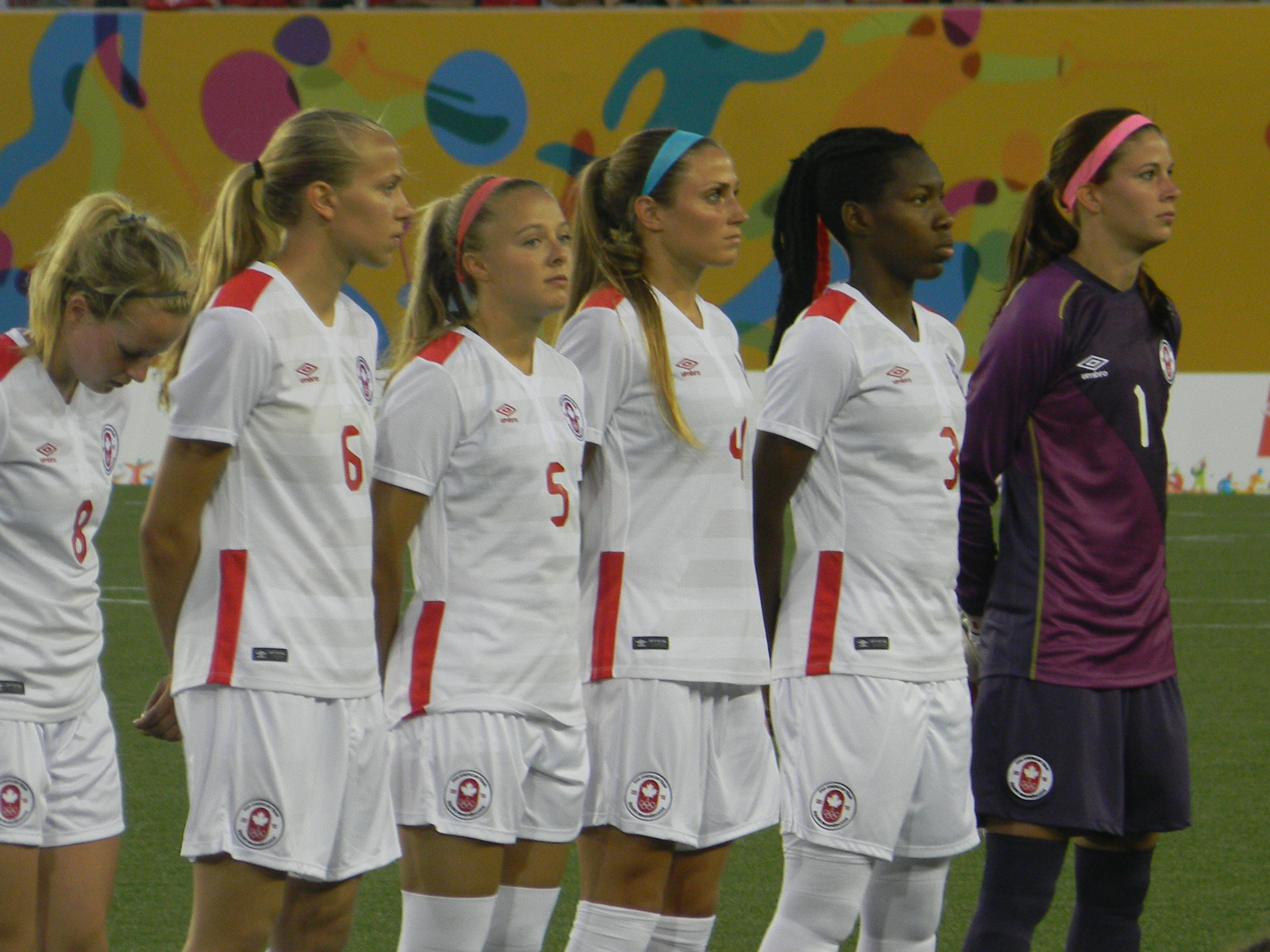
- Kinley McNicoll #5, during the game against Colombia 2015

Personal information
- Full name: Kinley McNicoll
- Date of birth: April 17, 1994 (age 32)
- Place of birth: Oakville, Ontario, Canada
- Height: 1.62 m (5 ft 4 in)
- Position: Defender

Youth career
- Burlington SC

College career
Years	Team	Apps	(Gls)
2012–2015	Wisconsin Badgers	78	(22)

Senior career*
Years	Team	Apps	(Gls)
2011–2012	Toronto Lady Lynx		
2013	Ottawa Fury Women		
2015	Seattle Sounders Women		

International career^{‡}
2010	Canada U-17	4	(1)
2014	Canada U-20	0	(0)
2015	Canada	1	(0)
- * Club domestic league appearances and goals as of July 15, 2015 ‡ National team caps and goals as of July 15, 2015

Kinley McNicoll (born April 17, 1994) is a former Canadian soccer player. She played as a defender and/ or midfielder for the Seattle Sounders Women and the Canadian women's national soccer team.

== Early life ==
Born in Oakville, Ontario, Kinley attended White Oaks Secondary School. She was a member of the school's honour roll for all four years she attended.

== Playing career ==
=== International ===
Kinley made her senior international debut for the Canada women's national soccer team in 2015 at the Pan-American Games.
