= London Gryphons =

- Full name: London Gryphons
- Nickname: The Gryphons
- Founded: 2004
- Dissolved: 2015
- Stadium: North London Stadium
- Capacity: 3,000
- Chairman: Edwin Lauterbach
- Manager: Aaron Lauterbach
- League: USL W-League
- 2010: 6th, Midwest Division
Home colours	Away colours

London Gryphons was a Canadian women's soccer team, founded in 2004. The team was a member of the USL W-League, the second tier of women's soccer in the United States and Canada. The team played its home games at North London Stadium in the city of London, Ontario. The club's colours were navy blue, white and red.

For 2010 season the team played in the Midwest Division of the Central Conference. For 2011 season, London Gryphons returns in the Great Lakes Division of the Central Conference and play against teams from Laval, Hamilton, Quebec, Ottawa, Rochester and Toronto.

In 2015 the London Gryphons dissolved, citing high costs and low revenues.

== Players ==
The following former players have played at the senior international and/or professional level:

- (Republic of Ireland) Sylvia Gee

== Year-by-year ==
- See also: 2004 season
- See also: 2005 season
- See also: 2006 season
- See also: 2007 season
- See also: 2008 season
- See also: 2009 season
- See also: 2010 season
- See also: 2011 season

Year	League	Division	Regular season	Playoffs
2004	USL W-League	Midwest Division	8th	Did not qualify
2005	USL W-League	Midwest Division	3rd	Did not qualify
2006	USL W-League	Midwest Division	6th	Did not qualify
2007	USL W-League	Midwest Division	5th	Did not qualify
2008	USL W-League	Northern Division	7th	Did not qualify
2009	USL W-League	Great Lakes Division	6th	Did not qualify
2010	USL W-League	Midwest Division	6th	Did not qualify
2011	USL W-League	Great Lakes Division	7th	Did not qualify
