= Alexa Diaz =

American–Filipino footballer

Personal information
- Full name: Alexa Nicole Diaz
- Date of birth: 19 September 1993 (age 33)
- Place of birth: Seattle, Washington, U.S.
- Height: 1.65 m (5 ft 5 in)
- Position: Defender

Youth career
- Kennedy Catholic Lancers

College career
| Years | Team | Apps | (Gls) |
| 2011–2014 | Seattle Pacific Falcons | | |

International career^{‡}
| 2013– | Philippines | | |
- ‡ National team caps and goals as of 24 July 2016 (before the 2016 AFF Women's Championship)

Alexa Nicole Diaz (born 19 September 1993) is a professional footballer who plays as a defender. Born in the United States, she represented the Philippines women's national team.

== Early life ==
Diaz was born on 19 September 1993 to a Filipino father and a Panamanian mother in Seattle, U.S. She is a native of the town of Burien, Washington and attended John F. Kennedy Catholic High School.

== Career ==
Diaz played for the Seattle Pacific Falcons women's soccer team during her college years as a defender.

Diaz was selected to be part of the Philippines women's national team that will later play in the 2014 AFC Women's Asian Cup qualifiers in Bangladesh in 2013 after participating in a tryout held in March 2012 by then-national team head coach Ernest Nierras in Corona, California. However she was not able to participate due to the late arrival of her proof of citizenship.

She later made her debut later that year, at the 2013 Southeast Asian Games playing in both group stage match against hosts, Myanmar and defending champions, Vietnam.

Diaz also took part in the Philippines' campaign in the 2018 AFC Women's Asian Cup in Jordan.

== Coaching ==
She is part of the coaching staff of the Pacific Northwest Soccer Club and is a holder of at least a USSF National E License.
