= Robyn Horner =

American soccer coach and former player

Personal information
- Full name: Robyn Jones Horner
- Birth name: Robyn Leigh Jones
- Date of birth: January 1, 1985 (age 41)
- Place of birth: Roseburg, Oregon, United States
- Height: 5 ft 6 in (1.68 m)
- Position: Goalkeeper

Youth career
- 1999–2003: The Pennington School

College career
| Years | Team | Apps | (Gls) |
| 2003–2004 | Rutgers Scarlet Knights | | |
| 2005–2006 | Franklin & Marshall Diplomats | | |

Senior career*
| Years | Team | Apps | (Gls) |
| 2007–2009 | New Jersey Wildcats | 39 | |
| 2010–2011 | Philadelphia Independence | | |
| 2012–2015 | Charlotte Lady Eagles | | |
| 2015 | Western New York Flash | 1 | (0) |
- * Club domestic league appearances and goals

Robyn Jones Horner (born Robyn Leigh Jones; January 1, 1985) is an American soccer coach and former player. She played as a goalkeeper.

== Early life ==
Horner grew up in the Titusville section of Hopewell Township, Mercer County, New Jersey and played high school soccer at The Pennington School.

She attended Rutgers University for two years on a partial scholarship for soccer, though she eventually transferred to Franklin & Marshall University for the experience of attending a smaller campus.

== Club career ==
Horner started her club soccer career with the New Jersey Wildcats of the USL W-League. Thanks to her performance at an open tryout Horner made the transition to becoming a professional player, joining the Philadelphia Independence of Women's Professional Soccer, where she played for two seasons. Following the folding of the WPS as a league and the Independence as a club in early 2012, Horner would return to the USL W-League, spending the 2012 through 2015 seasons with the Charlotte Lady Eagles.

Horner would return to professional play for one final match, getting recruited as an emergency goalkeeper by Western New York Flash after both of their starting keepers were unable to feature on May 23, 2015. Horner would get the win in her sole National Women's Soccer League appearance.

== Coaching career ==
Horner began her coaching career in 2013 at Pfeiffer University, joining the Pfeiffer Falcons women's soccer staff as an assistant coach. She took over the role of head coach in 2015, going on to lead the team for four seasons with an overall record of 39-26-3.

Horner joined the Charlotte Independence organization in 2019 in roles of Director of Goalkeeping and Head Coach in their girls academy. She was announced as the inaugural coach for the club's USL W League team ahead of the 2022 season. She returned as head coach for the 2023 W League season, which would be the team's final season.

Following her time with the W League's Independence, Horner returned to college soccer as goalkeeper coach for the Wingate Bulldogs women's soccer team.
