= Cégep Garneau =

Public college in Quebec City, Quebec

Coordinates: 46°47′32″N 71°15′50″W

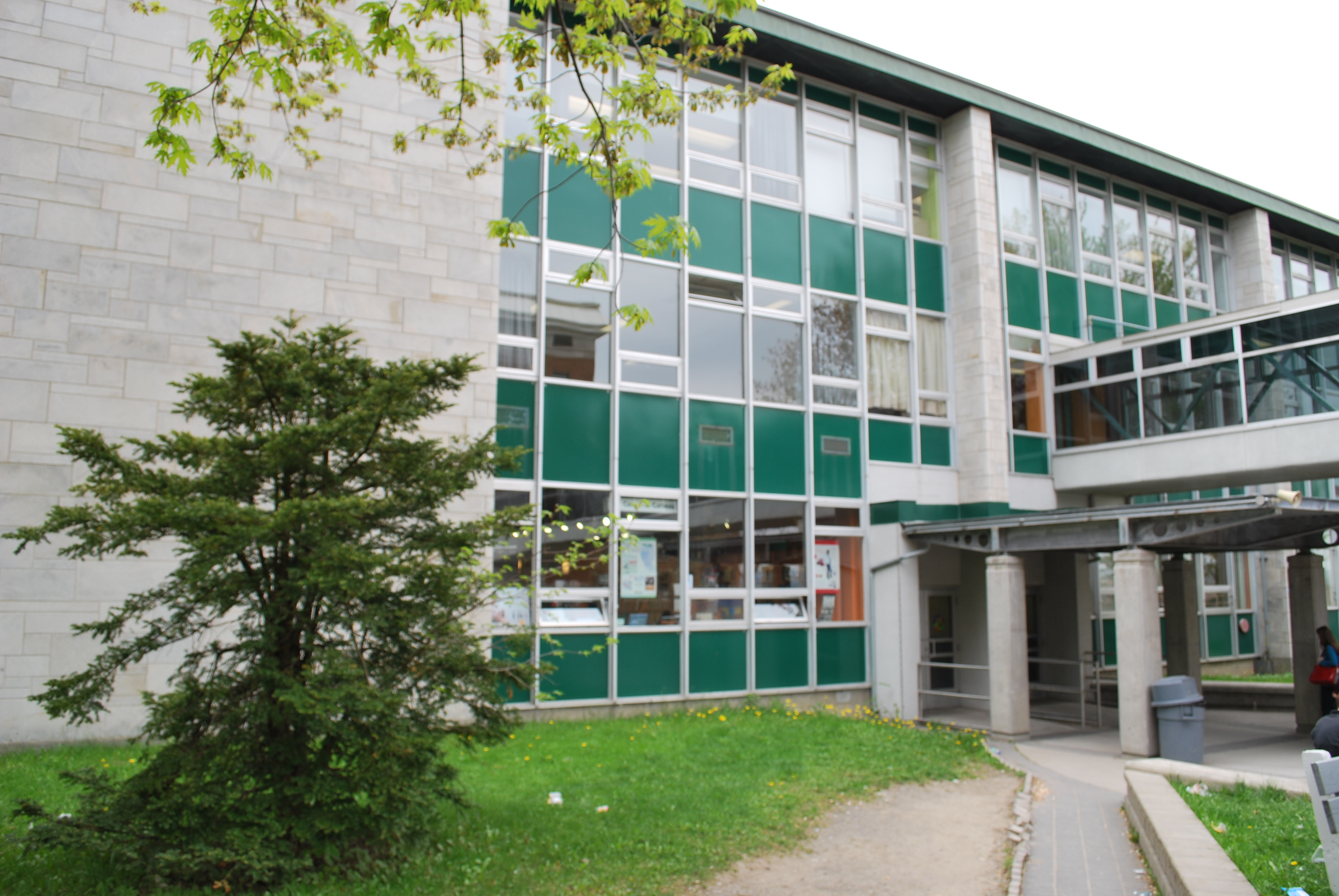
- Motto: Vivez l'expérience Garneau
- Type: Public
- Established: 1967
- Academic affiliations: ACCC, AUCC
- Administrative staff: 500
- Students: About 8,000
- Location: 1660, boulevard de l'Entente; Quebec City, Quebec; G1S 4S3
- Campus: Urban
- Sporting affiliations: CCAA, QSSF
- Website: cegepgarneau.ca

The Cégep Garneau is a public French-language college in Quebec City, Quebec, Canada.

== History ==
The college traces its origins to the merger of several institutions which became public ones in 1967, when the Quebec system of public colleges was created. It was established in 1969 by the merger of the Collège des Jésuites (Jesuit College) and École normale Laval (Laval Normal school) and was until 2012 known as Collège François-Xavier-Garneau.

The college was named for François-Xavier Garneau, a nineteenth-century French Canadian notary, poet and historian.

== Programs ==
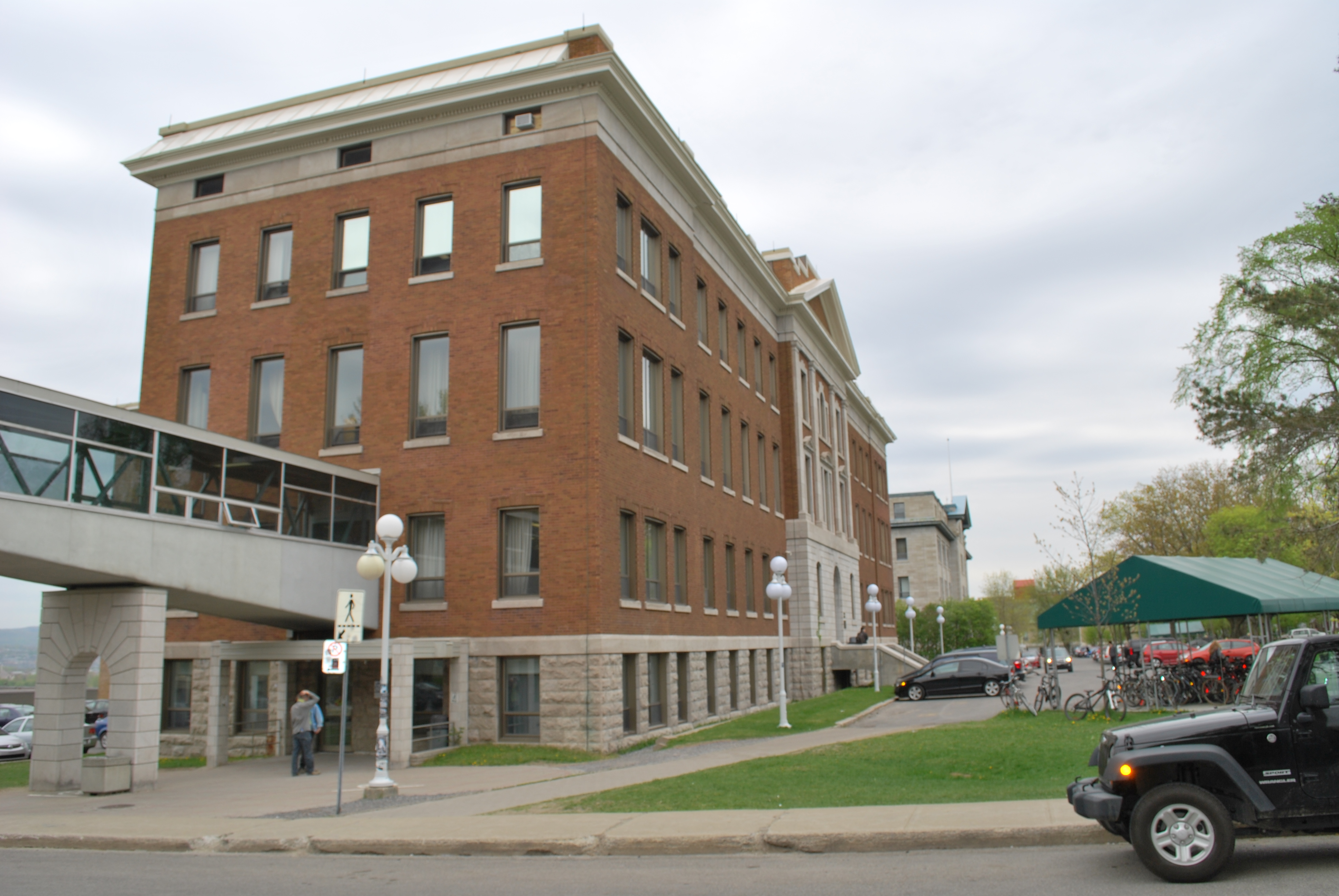
Pavillon du Collège François-Xavier-Garneau

The college offers two types of programs: pre-university and technical.

The pre-university programs, which take two years to complete, cover the subject matters which roughly correspond to the additional year of high school as well as the first year of a four-year college undergraduate program given elsewhere in Canada in preparation for a chosen field in university (in Quebec, most non-engineering undergraduate programs take three years to complete). The pre-university programs allow students greater specialization in their preferred field of study. For example, the "Sciences de la Nature" (Natural Sciences) diploma incorporates multiple courses in physics, chemistry, biology, and mathematics, preparing students specifically for a university program in Sciences, Engineering, or Medicine, but is also widely accepted across most non-scientific university programs.

The technical programs, which take three years to complete, apply to students who wish to be career-ready. However, many students choose to pursue a university degree. In addition, the Continuing Education Centre offers a wide variety of credit courses and programs with flexible scheduling.

== Partnerships ==
The College of General and Vocational Education is affiliated with the Association of Canadian Community Colleges (ACCC) and the Canadian Colleges Athletic Association (CCAA).

== Notable alumni ==
- Geoffrey Cantin-Arku
- Stéphane Dion
- Joseph Facal
- Alex Harvey (skier)
- François Paradis
- Hugo Girard
- Vincent-Guillaume Otis

== Athletics ==
The François-Xavier-Garneau Élans are the athletic teams that represent Collège François-Xavier-Garneau in Quebec City, Quebec, Canada. They compete with other schools in Réseau du sport étudiant du Québec (RSEQ).

The college also participates in the Canadian Colleges Athletic Association.

== See also ==
- List of colleges in Quebec
- Higher education in Quebec
