= New Jersey Rangers (W-League) =

- Full name: New Jersey Rangers
- Nickname: Rangers
- Founded: 2010
- Ground: Morris Catholic High School; Denville, New Jersey
- Capacity: 500
- Owner: (United States) Aaron Balber
- Head Coach: TBA
- League: USL W-League
Home colors	Away colors

New Jersey Rangers is an American soccer team based in Denville, New Jersey, United States. Founded in 2010, the team plays in the W-League, the second tier of Women's Soccer in America, in the Northeast Division of the Eastern Conference.

The team is a sister squad of the PDL's New Jersey Rangers.

== Players ==
=== 2010 roster ===
Note: Flags indicate national team as defined under FIFA eligibility rules; some limited exceptions apply. Players may hold more than one non-FIFA nationality.

No.	Pos.	Nation	Player

== Year-by-year ==
Year	Division	League	Regular season	Playoffs
2010	2	W-League	Northeast	

== Stadia ==
- Stadium at Morris Catholic High School; Denville, New Jersey (2010–present)
