= New Jersey Wildcats =

- Full name: New Jersey Wildcats
- Nickname: The Wildcats
- Founded: 1996
- Stadium: Woodbridge High School (New Jersey)
- Owner: Kevin McDermott
- Manager: Socrates Nicolaidis
- League: WPSL
- 2018: 4th in the East Region (Metropolitan Conference)
Home colors	Away colors

The New Jersey Wildcats is an American women's soccer team, founded by Vincent Baldino in 1996. The team was a member of the United Soccer Leagues W-League, the second tier of women's soccer in the United States and Canada. The team played in the Northeast Division of the Eastern Conference against the D.C. United Women, New Jersey Rangers, Long Island Rough Riders, New York Magic, and North Jersey Valkyries.

As of April 2018, the Wildcats have merged their teams with Princeton Soccer Association to create the PSA Wildcats. In addition to the merge, the Wildcats have joined the WPSL, playing in the East Region (Metropolitan Conference) alongside SUSA FC, New York Athletic Club, Rhode Island Rogues, and Long Island Fury, as of the 2019 WPSL season. The team currently plays its home games in the stadium at Woodbridge High School in Woodbridge, New Jersey. The club's colors are white and blue.

== Players ==
=== 2012 roster ===
Note: Flags indicate national team as defined under FIFA eligibility rules; some limited exceptions apply. Players may hold more than one non-FIFA nationality.

No.	Pos.	Nation	Player
19	MF	USA	Yael Averbuch
23	MF	USA	Rachel Breton
20	MF	USA	Amber Brooks
—	DF	USA	Lauren Budzinski
16	DF	USA	Catherine Chukuka
11	FW	USA	Grace Correll
8	DF	USA	Brittany Cummins
—	GK	USA	Sage Dovale
12	MF	USA	Kristen Edmonds
9	DF	USA	Kaitlyn Fare
5	FW	USA	Maya Hayes
13	FW	USA	Rachael Ivanicki
2	MF	USA	Andie Lakin

No.	Pos.	Nation	Player
22	FW	USA	Meghan Ledwith
18	DF	USA	Tori Leigh
22	FW	USA	Andrea Lopez
—		USA	Jesse McDonough
7	DF	USA	Taylor Mims
10	FW	USA	Esmeralda Negron
10	MF	USA	Kylee Rossi
99	GK	GUY	Chanté Sandiford
21	DF	USA	Daryl Schwenck
0	GK	USA	Lauren Smedley
6	DF	USA	Morgan Stith
1	GK	USA	Faith Sugerman
4	DF	USA	Elizabeth Troutman

=== Roster 2009 ===
Note: Flags indicate national team as defined under FIFA eligibility rules; some limited exceptions apply. Players may hold more than one non-FIFA nationality.

No.	Pos.	Nation	Player
1	GK	USA	Robyn Jones
3	DF	USA	Morgan Golden
4	MF	USA	Michelle Verzi
5	MF	USA	Nicole Canning
6	DF	USA	Chelsea Regan
7	MF	USA	Ashley Lunemann
8	FW	USA	Amy Hoyer
9	DF	USA	Corinne Bildstein
10	MF	USA	Aimee Bresani
11	MF	USA	Lisa Chinn
13	FW	USA	Jill Camburn
14	DF	USA	Ali Kliment
16	FW	USA	Kaila Sciascia
17	DF	USA	Su-Lin DelGuercio
18	MF	USA	Stephanie Maurer
21	MF	USA	Kimberly Lisun
22	MF	USA	Daniella Alizzo

No.	Pos.	Nation	Player
23	DF	USA	Lissette Brandao
24	MF	USA	Kaylyn Mahon
41	GK	USA	Elizabeth Cook
—	MF	USA	Stephanie Covello
—	MF	USA	Samantha Germano
—	MF	USA	Ashley Jones
—	DF	USA	Abby Lambert
—	DF	USA	Kristie Lang
—	MF	USA	Kerry Little
—	MF	USA	Valentina Montero
—	MF	USA	Esmeraldo Negron
—	DF	USA	Casey Ramirez
—	MF	USA	Leia Rispoli
12	FW	USA	Rachel Breton
—	FW	USA	Kylee Rossi
—	FW	USA	Lauren Ruta
—	DF	USA	Jennie Vartebedian
—	DF	USA	Amanda Wheeler

== Year-by-year ==
Year	Division	League	Reg. season	Playoffs
2003	2	USL W-League	3rd, Northeast	
2004	1	USL W-League	1st, Northeast	W-League Runners-Up
2005	1	USL W-League	1st, Northeast	Champions
2006	1	USL W-League	1st, Northeast	Conference Finals
2007	1	USL W-League	5th, Northeast	Did not qualify
2008	1	USL W-League	8th, Northeast	Did not qualify

=== Notable former players ===
The following former players have played at the professional and/or international level:

- (United States) Jenny Benson
- (Portugal) Kimberly Brandão
- (Switzerland) Lara Dickenmann
- (Brazil) Formiga
- (United States) Kendall Fletcher
- (United States) Tobin Heath
- (Canada) Christine Latham
- (Canada) Karina LeBlanc
- (United States) Carli Lloyd
- (Finland) Anne Mäkinen
- (United States) Esmeralda Negron
- (United States) Heather O'Reilly
- (Guyana) Chanté Sandiford
- (England) Kelly Smith
- (United States) Lindsay Tarpley
- (United States) Christie Welsh
- (United States) Cat Whitehill
- (England) Rachel Unitt
- (England) Rachel Yankey
- (Colombia) Yoreli Rincón
- (France) Marinette Pichon

== Honors ==
- USL W-League Northeast Division Champions 2006
- USL W-League Champions 2005
- USL W-League Northeast Division Champions 2005
- USL W-League Northeast Division Champions 2004

== Coaches ==
- (Australia) Socrates Nicolaidis 2007–2008
- Mike Barroqueiro 2008
- Dave Barbour – Present

== Stadiums ==
- Stadium at Robbinsville High School, Robbinsville, New Jersey 2008–present
- Stadium at Paul VI High School, Haddon Township, New Jersey 2008 (1 game)
- Stadium at Mercer County Community College, West Windsor, New Jersey 1999–2009
- Field 1 at Mercer County Park, West Windsor, New Jersey 1996–1998
