= Toronto Lady Lynx =

- Full name: Toronto Lady Lynx Soccer Club
- Nickname: The Lynx
- Founded: 2005
- Stadium: Centennial Park Stadium
- Capacity: 2,200
- Chairman: Nicole Hartrell
- Manager: Danny Stewart
- League: USL W-League
- 2010: 2nd, Great Lakes Division; Playoff Divisional round
| Home colours | Away colours |

Toronto Lady Lynx was a Canadian women's soccer team, founded in 2005. The team was a member of the USL W-League, formerly the second tier of women’s soccer in the United States and Canada. The team played in the Great Lakes Division of the Central Conference against teams from Laval, London, Ottawa, Quebec City and Waterloo.

The team played its home games at various stadiums around the city of Toronto, Ontario: primarily at Centennial Park Stadium, but also at the Soccer Centre in Vaughan, Ontario, as well as Oshawa Civic Auditorium in Oshawa, Ontario. The team's colours were white, gold and black.

The team was a sister organization of the men's Toronto Lynx team, which played in the USL Premier Development League.

== Players ==
=== Most recent roster ===
As of 18 June 2011.

Note: Flags indicate national team as defined under FIFA eligibility rules; some limited exceptions apply. Players may hold more than one non-FIFA nationality.

| No. | Pos. | Nation | Player |
|---|---|---|---|
| 1 | GK | CAN | Justine Bernier |
| 3 | DF | USA | Bryana McCarthy |
| 4 | DF | USA | Lexi Marton |
| 6 | DF | CAN | Vanessa Salerno |
| 8 | FW | CAN | Krystiana Clarke |
| 9 | MF | USA | Heather Bruce |
| 9 | MF | USA | Kelsi Landry |
| 10 | MF | CAN | Alyscha Mottershead (c) |
| 13 | MF | CAN | Clare Rustad |
| 14 | DF | CAN | Zovel Hyre |
| 14 | DF | CAN | Olivia Mbala |

| No. | Pos. | Nation | Player |
|---|---|---|---|
| 16 | FW | CAN | Jonelle Filigno |
| 17 | MF | USA | Nathalie Urbas |
| 18 | FW | USA | Lisa Collison |
| 20 | MF | CAN | Giselle Mangal |
| 21 | FW | CAN | Carmelina Puopolo |
| 22 | DF | USA | Robin Rushton |
| 23 | MF | CAN | Kodee Williams |
| 24 | DF | CAN | Rachel Melhado |
| 26 | DF | JAM | Christine Exeter |
| 27 | DF | CAN | Kayla Afonso |

=== Staff ===
- (Canada) Danny Stewart Head Coach
- (Canada) Paul DeAbreu Assistant Coach
- (Canada) Joe Nucifora Goalkeeper Coach
- (Canada) Dr. Robert Gringmuth Medical Coordinator
- (Canada) Dr. Frank Markus Team Doctor
- (Canada) Dr. Melanie Lopes Medical Assistants

== Year-by-year ==
| Year | League | Division | Regular season | Playoffs |
|---|---|---|---|---|
| 2005 | USL W-League | Northern Division | 2nd | finalist Eastern Championship |
| 2006 | USL W-League | Northern Division | 2nd | lost in Eastern Semifinals |
| 2007 | USL W-League | Northern Division | 2nd | lost in Eastern Semifinals |
| 2008 | USL W-League | Northern Division | 2nd | eliminated in first round |
| 2009 | USL W-League | Great Lakes Division | 4th | no participation to playoff |
| 2010 | USL W-League | Great Lakes Division | 2nd | lost in Central Semifinals |
| 2011 | USL W-League | Great Lakes Division | 4th | lost in Central Semifinals |
