= Laval Comets =

Former women's soccer team

- Full name: Laval Comets
- Nickname: Les Comètes
- Founded: 2006
- Dissolved: 2016
- Stadium: Centre Sportif Bois-de-Boulogne, Laval, QC
- Capacity: 800
- Chairman: Philippe Ciarlo
- League: W-League
Home colours	Away colours

The Laval Comets (French: Comètes de Laval) was a Canadian women's soccer team established in 2006 in the city of Laval, Quebec, Canada, a northern suburb of Montreal. The team was a member of the W-League, the second tier of women’s soccer in the United States and Canada.

The team played its home games at the Centre Sportif Bois-de-Boulogne. The club's colours were light blue and dark blue.

== History ==
The Comets were founded in 2005 by Pierre Marchand, a Laval businessman, following the demise of the Montreal Xtreme (2004) and Dynamites de Laval (1997-2001). Marchand was joined by 3 partners, the Montreal Impact, Centre Sportif Bois-de-Boulogne, and Soccer Québec, who assured the operation of the team for a minimum of three years. The club was set up as a non-profit organization owned by the 3 partners, to assure the long-term survival of the team.

In October 2005, contacts were established with the W-League, and a new franchise was granted to the group for the city of Laval. In November 2005, a competition was started for a name for the new team; hundreds of names were submitted. The club management selected the name Comètes de Laval. In January 2006, the club confirmed its first major team sponsor, Grolsch beer. The team's official colours, uniforms and the first players under contract were presented on March 8, 2006.

== Year-by-year ==
Year	League	Division	Regular season	Playoffs
2006	USL W-League	Northern Division	3rd	Did not qualify
2007	USL W-League	Northern Division	3rd	First round
2008	USL W-League	Northern Division	3rd	Conference Semifinals
2009	USL W-League	Great Lakes Division	5th	Did not qualify
2010	USL W-League	Great Lakes Division	3rd	First round
2011	USL W-League	Great Lakes Division	2nd	Conference Semifinals
2012	USL W-League	Central Division	3rd	Conference Semifinals
2013	USL W-League	Central Conference	1st	lost in Championship
2014	USL W-League	Central Conference	3rd	Conference Semifinals
2015	USL W-League	Northeastern Conference	1st	National Semifinals

== Players ==
The Comets had a wide range of talent, some from university and high school teams, and others that have played for the Canadian National Team (7 Comets players in the 2010 CONCACAF Women’s Under-20 Championship). Seasons were brief since most players played at Canadian and American universities, therefore these were designed to accommodate their schedules, ending the first week of August.

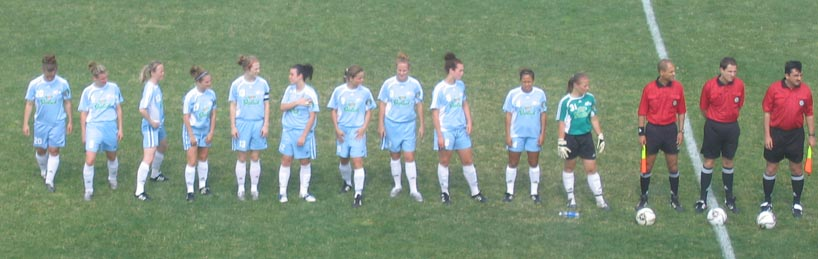
Comets line up for the national anthem.

=== Squad 2014 ===
Note: Flags indicate national team as defined under FIFA eligibility rules; some limited exceptions apply. Players may hold more than one non-FIFA nationality.

No.	Pos.	Nation	Player
1	GK	CAN	Genevieve Richard
2	DF	USA	Morgan Taylor
4	DF	CAN	Julia Liguori
5	DF	CAN	Kelsey Wilson
6	DF	CAN	Natasha Tcheki-Jamgotchain
7	MF	CAN	Kylie Davis
8	MF	CAN	Constance de Chantal Dumont
9	MF	CAN	Vanessa Grégoire
10	MF	CAN	Catherine Charron-Delage
11	MF	CAN	Kaitlyn Fournier
12	MF	CAN	Rhian Wilkinson
13	FW	CAN	Mélissa Busque
14	FW	CAN	Josée Bélanger

No.	Pos.	Nation	Player
15	DF	CAN	Kathryn Acton
16	MF	CAN	Valérie Sanderson
17	FW	CAN	Amandine Pierre-Louis
18	FW	CAN	Amy Pietrangelo
19	DF	CAN	Marissa Duguay
21	DF	CAN	Marie-Ève Bernard O'Breham
22	MF	CAN	Larissa Fedorowich
23	MF	USA	McKenzie Bricker
24	FW	CAN	Véronique Laverdière
28	GK	CAN	Lysianne Proulx
—	MF	CAN	Audrey Lagarde
—	DF	CAN	Courtney Wilkinson-Maitland

== Coaching staff 2014 ==
- Head Coach: Cindy Walsh
- Assistant Coach: Chantal Daigle

=== Former head coach ===
- (Canada) Mohamed Hilen (2006-2008)
- (Canada) Lyonel Joseph (2009-2012)

=== Former assistant coach ===
- (Canada) Owen Braun (2006, 2007, 2008, 2009, 2010)

=== Former assistant coach ===
- (Canada) Jimmy Patsilivas (2014 & 2015)

== Rivalries ==
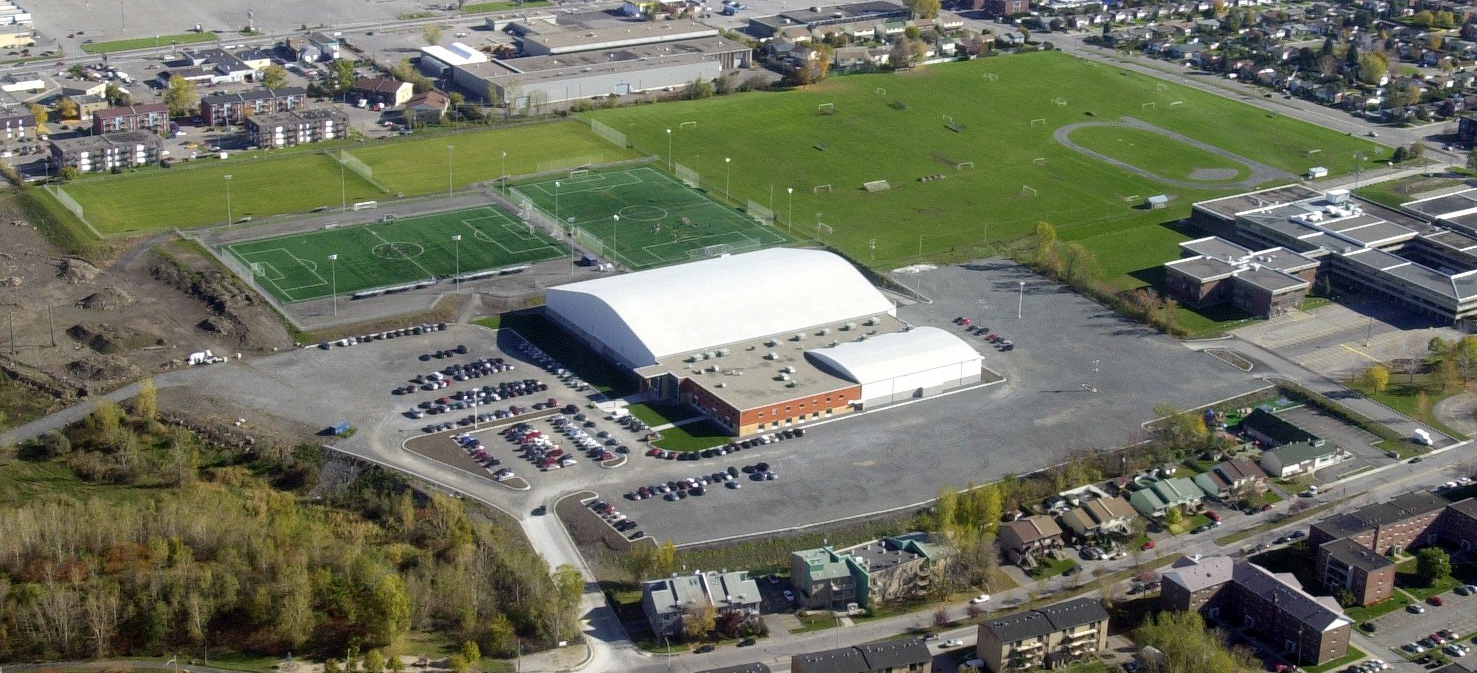
the Centre sportif Bois-De-Boulogne

The Comets had a major rivalry with Quebec City Amiral SC. Several former players on the Comets played for the Amiral SC. In matches between the two teams, it was common for supporters to travel between Montreal and Quebec City to watch the teams.

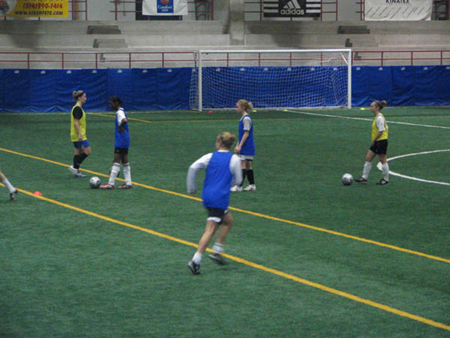
Laval Comet training inside of Centre sportif Bois-De-Boulogne

== Supporters ==
At the gate, the Comets had average crowds of 500 fans. After a disappointing season in 2009 (where the average gate was between 800 and 900 people), the attendance to the matches fell to 266 persons a match in 2010.

The all-time single-game high was the 952 fans in attendance against Ottawa Fury Women on Friday, July 4, 2008.
