= North Jersey Valkyries =

Coordinates: 40.959°N 74.245°W

- Full name: North Jersey Valkyries
- Founded: 2009
- Stadium: DePaul Catholic High School
- League: United Women's Soccer
Home colors	Away colors

North Jersey Valkyries was an American women's soccer team, founded in 2009 based in Wayne, New Jersey, United States. The team was a member of the United Soccer Leagues W-League and United Women's Soccer.

The team's home field was on the grounds of DePaul Catholic High School. They played their last season in 2016 as the TSF Academy Valkyries,

== Year-by-year ==
Year	Division	League	Regular season	Playoffs
2010	2	W-League	7th, Northeast	Did not qualify
2011	2	W-League	4th, Northeast	Did not qualify
2012	2	W-League	2nd, Northeast	Did not qualify
2013	2	W-League	6th, Northeast	Did not qualify
2014	2	W-League	6th, Northeast	Did not qualify
2015	2	W-League	4th, Northeast	Did not qualify
2016	2	UWS	5th, East	Did not qualify

== Stadia ==
DePaul Catholic High School 2010—2016
