= Sound FC (women) =

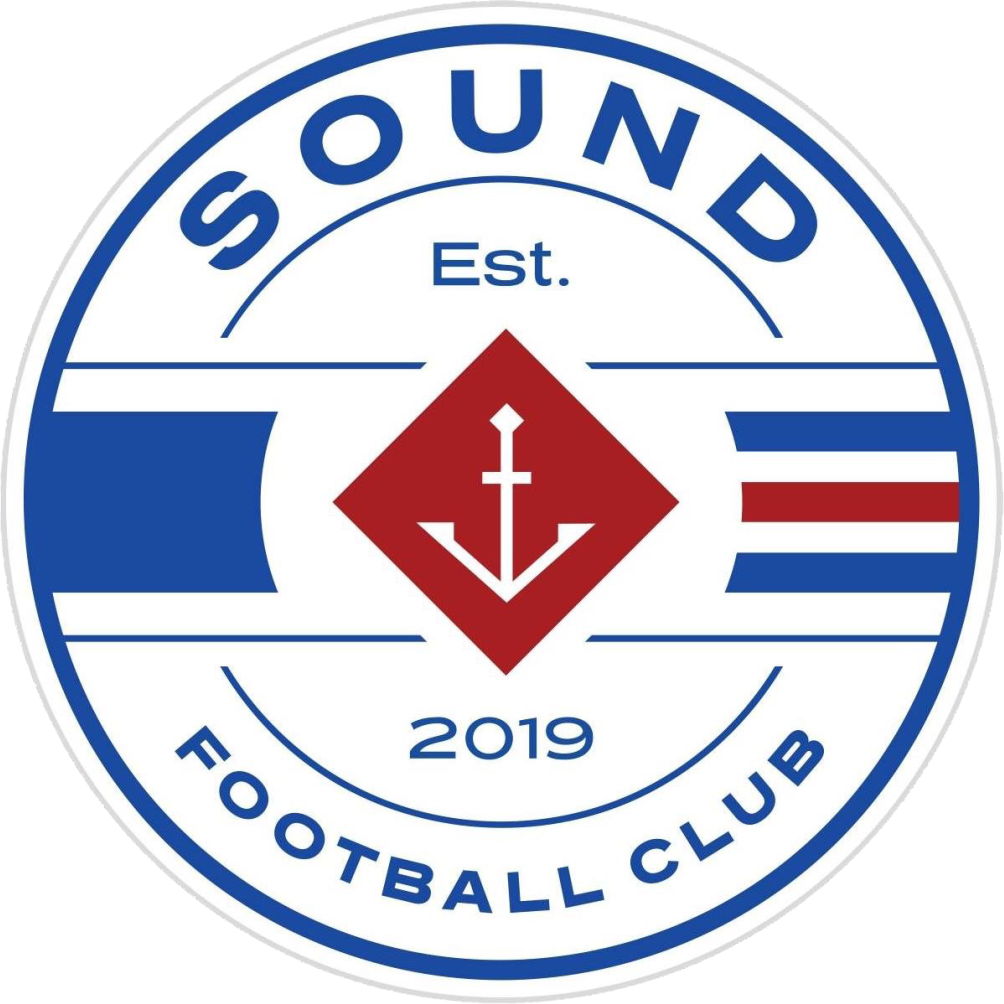
- Full name: Sound Football Club
- Founded: 2019
- Stadium: Starfire Sports Stadium
- Capacity: 4,500
- Owners: Cliff McElroy; Lane Smith
- General manager: Jason Prenovost
- Head coach: Scott Ford
- League: Women's Premier Soccer League
- Website: http://sounderswomen.com/
| Home colors | Away colors | Third colors |

Sound Football Club is an American women's soccer team in the Women's Premier Soccer League. Sound FC play its home games at Starfire Sports Stadium in Tukwila, Washington, six miles south of downtown Seattle.

The team was founded in 2000 as Seattle Sounders Select Women, a sister organization of the men's team in the USL First Division. The Select Women competed in the original USL W-League until the league was disbanded in 2015. Following the men's team's departure for Major League Soccer, Mike Jennings, owner of the United Soccer League franchise Tacoma Tide, took over the Sounders Women's ownership. In 2011, Cliff McElroy and Lane Smith of Datec Inc. became majority owners, while Mike Jennings has maintained a minority stake. In January 2020, Seattle Sounders FC terminated its branding agreement, leading to an affiliation and rebrand with Sound FC, a youth soccer club based in Woodinville, Washington.

The team most notable for having signed five U.S. international players, Hope Solo, Alex Morgan, Megan Rapinoe, Sydney Leroux, and Stephanie Cox, following the collapse of the Women's Professional Soccer in 2012.

== History ==
The Seattle Sounders of the second-division A-League announced plans for a women's team in April 2000 and hired Chance Fry as head coach. The organization had planned for a women's team for several years and named them Seattle Sounders Select Women as part of their development system, which already included the men's Seattle Sounders Select in the USL Premier Development League. The team held an open tryout at the end of the month that included 55 players, mostly from Washington state. They played exhibition matches in the provisional Pacific Northwest Division of the USL W-League, with home games primarily at Memorial Stadium in Seattle that would precede men's Sounders games.

The Select Women played their inaugural match on June 10, 2000, against the Spokane Chill at Joe Albi Stadium and won 5–0 with two goals by forward Janelle Munnis. The team finished the 2000 season with an undefeated 8–0–3 record and outscored their opponents 40–4 in provisional league matches and friendlies. The women's team drew approximately 5,000 total spectators at Memorial Stadium, including 2,222 at the home opener on June 29 against the Vancouver Lady 86ers; an additional exhibition game at Mount St. High School in Snoqualmie drew 1,300 in attendance. The Select Women formally joined the W-League's 1st Division in 2001 and was placed in the Western Conference alongside the Portland Rain and Vancouver Breakers (successor to the Lady 86ers). Seattle played their home matches at Issaquah High School and finished second in the conference with a 12–4–4 record, but failed to qualify for the playoffs.

The Select Women started their 2002 season with a four-match losing streak but recovered to a 7–5–0 record to qualify for the W-League Playoffs. It was their first season under head coach Dick McCormick, who was also an assistant coach for the men's team and played several matches during the year. They were the first team to play at the new Seahawks Stadium (now Lumen Field) as part of a doubleheader with the Sounders against their respective Vancouver opponents on July 27, 2002. The Select Women won 4–3 in overtime. The team won 5–1 in their opening playoffs match against the Arizona Heatwave in Highlands Ranch, Colorado, with four goals scored by Shelby Brownfield. The Select Women advanced to face hosts Denver Lady Cougars for a semifinal berth, but lost 2–1 in overtime.

The team finished second in the Western Conference in 2003 behind the Vancouver Whitecaps, who they met in the Western Conference Finals. The match was tied 2–2 through regulation and extra time and won by the Sounders Women in a penalty shootout; goalkeeper Meghan Miller made three saves in the shootout to clinch the victory for Seattle. The Sounders Women made their first appearance in the W-League Semifinals and lost 4–1 to the Hampton Roads Piranhas. Seattle won the third-place match against the Ottawa Fury in Virginia Beach, Virginia, and earned their first league honors.

The Sounders Women merged with the women's team of amateur club Hibernian Saints in 2006 to form the Seattle Sounders Saints Women. The club was sold to the Tacoma Tides in December 2008 and continued to use the Sounders name following the men's team move to Major League Soccer. The Sounders organization expressed interest in fielding a team in Women's Professional Soccer (WPS) prior to its folding in 2012. The team signed several professional WPS players, including U.S. national team members Hope Solo, Alex Morgan, Megan Rapinoe, and Sydney Leroux, for the 2012 season. The national team players trained separately and did not travel for away matches, but helped the Sounders Women draw sold out crowds at Starfire Sports before they left for National Women's Soccer League teams, including the new Seattle Reign FC. After the W-League folded in November 2015, the Sounders Women moved to the Women's Premier Soccer League (WPSL). They won a WPSL championship in 2018. The team terminated their branding agreement with the MLS Sounders in January 2020 and were renamed Sound FC.

== Stadiums ==
- Issaquah High School (2001), capacity: 2,500

== Current players ==
As of May 21, 2019.

Note: Flags indicate national team as defined under FIFA eligibility rules; some limited exceptions apply. Players may hold more than one non-FIFA nationality.

| No. | Pos. | Nation | Player |
|---|---|---|---|
| 1 | GK | USA | Laurel Ivory |
| 2 | DF | USA | Alyssa Conarton |
| 3 | DF | USA | Kaylene Pang |
| 4 | DF | USA | Jodi Ulkekul |
| 5 | MF | USA | Kristina O'Donnell |
| 6 | FW | USA | Morgan Weaver |
| 7 | FW | AUS | Melina Ayres |
| 8 | FW | USA | Kaylee Dao |
| 9 | MF | USA | Summer Yates |
| 10 | MF | JPN | Yuuka Kurosaki |
| 11 | DF | USA | Kirsten Pavlisko |
| 12 | DF | USA | Jordan Thompson |
| 13 | DF | USA | Kimberly Hazlett |
| 14 | MF | USA | Taylor Nielsen |
| 15 | DF | USA | Emily Madril |
| 16 | DF | USA | Samantha Hiatt |

| No. | Pos. | Nation | Player |
|---|---|---|---|
| 17 | MF | USA | Sianna Siemonsma |
| 18 | DF | PHI | Alicia Barker |
| 19 | MF | USA | Taylor Radecki |
| 20 | MF | USA | Sophie Hirst |
| 21 | MF | USA | Olivia Van der Jagt |
| 22 | FW | USA | Leahi Manthei |
| 23 | MF | USA | Holly Rothering |
| 24 | FW | USA | India Jencks |
| 25 | FW | JAM | Mireya Grey |
| 26 | DF | USA | Stephanie Spiekerman |
| 27 | MF | JPN | Hikari Yamada |
| 28 | DF | USA | Rachel Bowler |
| 29 | MF | USA | Anna Henderson |
| 30 | GK | USA | Riley Travis |
| 31 | GK | USA | Madeline Nielsen |

== Year-by-year ==
| Year | League | Reg. season | Playoffs | Head coach |
|---|---|---|---|---|
| 2000 | None | —N/a | —N/a | Chance Fry |
| 2001 | USL W-League | 2nd, Western | did not qualify | Chance Fry |
| 2002 | USL W-League | 4th, Western | Western Conference Finals | Dick McCormick |
| 2003 | USL W-League | 2nd, Western | National Semifinals (3rd Place) | Dick McCormick |
| 2004 | USL W-League | 2nd, Western | Western Conference Finals | Dick McCormick |
| 2005 | USL W-League | 5th, Western | did not qualify | Shawn Percell |
| 2006 | USL W-League | 2nd, Western | National Semifinals (3rd Place) | Teddy Mitalas |
| 2007 | USL W-League | 2nd, Western | National Semifinals (3rd Place) | Teddy Mitalas |
| 2008 | USL W-League | 3rd, Western | National Semifinals (4th Place) | Teddy Mitalas |
| 2009 | USL W-League | 4th, Western | did not qualify | Teddy Mitalas |
| 2010 | USL W-League | 3rd, Western | did not qualify | Leighton O'Brien |
| 2011 | USL W-League | 5th, Western | National Semifinals (4th Place) | Leighton O'Brien |
| 2012 | USL W-League | 2nd, Western | Western Conference Finals | Michelle French |
| 2013 | USL W-League | 3rd, Western | did not qualify | Hubert Busby Jr. |
| 2014 | USL W-League | 3rd, Western | did not qualify | Hubert Busby Jr. |
| 2015 | USL W-League | 1st, Western | Conference Playoff | Hubert Busby Jr. |
| 2016 | WPSL | 1st, Northwestern | Conference Playoff | Hubert Busby Jr. |
| 2017 | WPSL | 1st, Northwestern | Conference Playoff | Scott Ford |
| 2018 | WPSL | 1st, Northwestern | WPSL Champions | Scott Ford |
| 2019 | WPSL | 1st, Northwestern | Championship Semifinals | Scott Ford |
