= List of Canada women's international soccer players =

The Canada women's national soccer team represents the country of Canada in international soccer. It is fielded by the Canada Soccer Association, the governing body of soccer in Canada, and competes as a member of CONCACAF, which encompasses the countries of North America, including Central America and the Caribbean. Canada competed in their first official international match on July 7, 1986, a 2–0 defeat to the United States national team in Blaine, Minnesota.

Canada have competed in numerous competitions, and all players, either as a member of the starting eleven or as a substitute, are listed below. Each player's details include the number of caps earned and goals scored in all international matches, and opponent of their first and last matches played in (a blank in the "last cap" column indicates an active player who has been called up in the last 12 months), ordered alphabetically. All statistics are correct up to and including the match played against the United States on July 18, 2022. Players that are still active at the club and/or international level are in bold.

== Full list of players ==
Player	Caps	Goals	Debut		Last or most recent match		Ref.
Player	Caps	Goals	Date	Opponent	Date	Opponent	Ref.
Lindsay Agnew	15	0	March 6, 2017	Portugal	February 24, 2021	Brazil	
Leisha Alcia	1	0	November 1, 2006		Brazil		
**Marie-Yasmine Alidou**	10	0	February 23, 2022	Spain			
Amber Allen	25	6	March 1, 2002	Scotland	July 26, 2008	New Zealand	
Amy Apps	2	0	September 1, 2005	Germany	September 4, 2005	Germany	
Sasha Andrews	47	3	March 1, 2002	Scotland	March 12, 2009	England	
Julie Armstrong	6	1	January 16, 2008	United States	March 14, 2008	France	
**Simi Awujo**	20	0	September 3, 2022	Australia			
Brittany Baxter	132	5	April 9, 2002	Japan	November 26, 2014	Sweden	
Rachelle Beanlands	1	0	October 20, 2011		Argentina		
**Janine Beckie**	116	35	November 26, 2014	Sweden			
Josée Bélanger	57	7	July 30, 2004	Japan	February 4, 2017	Mexico	
Jodie Biggan	2	0	June 1, 1988	China	June 5, 1988	Netherlands	
Tina Blaskovic	5	4	August 28, 1998	Puerto Rico	January 6, 1999	Italy	
Lisa Bliskis	1	0	June 21, 1993		United States		
Alysha Bonnick	2	0	April 24, 2010	China	June 3, 2010	Norway	
Melanie Booth	65	1	March 1, 2002	Scotland	March 8, 2013	Finland	
Myriam Bouchard	1	0	March 1, 2010		South Africa		
Patricia Bourcier	1	0	March 1, 2002		Scotland		
Mary Beth Bowie	13	0	May 21, 1999	Mexico	June 28, 2000	Guatemala	
Breanna Boyd	43	2	July 25, 1999	Costa Rica	May 22, 2003	England	
Heather Brown	3	0	May 15, 1996	China	July 4, 1996	Brazil	
**Kadeisha Buchanan**	154	4	January 12, 2013	China			
Chelsea Buckland	13	1	May 15, 2011	Switzerland	May 30, 2012	China	
**Zoe Burns**	1	0	April 11, 2022	Nigeria			
Silvana Burtini	77	38	July 5, 1987	Sweden	October 5, 2003	Sweden	
Melissa Busque	3	0	June 19, 2013	Germany	November 24, 2013	Mexico	
Tiffany Cameron	6	0	January 12, 2013	China	June 2, 2013	United States	
Connie Cant	22	4	July 7, 1986	United States	April 24, 1991	Trinidad and Tobago	
Maureen Cant	4	0	July 7, 1986	United States	July 7, 1987	United States	
**Gabrielle Carle**	54	1	December 9, 2015	Mexico			
Annie Caron	34	8	July 7, 1986	United States	June 10, 1995	Norway	
Brigitte Chandonnet	4	0	June 7, 1997	Australia	August 2, 1998	United States	
**Samantha Chang**	3	0	February 21, 2021	Argentina			
**Allysha Chapman**	99	2	October 25, 2014	Japan			
Candace Chapman	114	6	March 1, 2002	Scotland	August 9, 2012	France	
Laura Chénard	3	0	March 1, 2010	South Africa	December 15, 2010	Brazil	
Carla Chin	29	0	December 11, 1987	Hong Kong	June 10, 1995	Norway	
Roxanne Chow	1	0	August 2, 1998		United States		
Amanda Cicchini	6	0	April 21, 2005	Germany	July 30, 2006	United States	
Summer Clarke	1	1	March 4, 2016		Belgium		
Janice Cossar	4	0	December 17, 1987	Australia	June 5, 1988	Netherlands	
Rose Daley	3	0	June 10, 1993	Italy	June 21, 1993	United States	
**Sabrina D'Angelo**	20	0	March 4, 2016	Belgium			
Tracy David	7	0	July 7, 1986	United States	December 20, 1987	New Zealand	
Tanya Dennis	18	0	August 31, 2003	Mexico	September 20, 2007	Australia	
Marie-Claude Dion	27	0	May 12, 1996	United States	March 15, 2001	Portugal	
Geri Donnelly	71	9	July 9, 1986	United States	June 26, 1999	Russia	
Sophie Drolet	1	0	May 12, 1996		United States		
**Nkem Ezurike**	5	0	March 5, 2014	Finland			
**Kennedy Faulknor**	4	0	December 9, 2015	Mexico			
Nancy Anne Ferguson	3	0	June 10, 1993	Italy	June 21, 1993	United States	
Jeanne Fetsch	1	0	July 9, 1986		United States		
Jonelle Filigno	71	11	January 16, 2008	United States	June 21, 2015	Switzerland	
Stefanie Finateri	1	0	March 12, 2000		China		
**Jessie Fleming**	143	18	December 15, 2013	Chile			
Kendra Flock	2	1	February 20, 2010	Poland	March 1, 2010	South Africa	
Lynn Forsyth	6	0	June 10, 1993	Italy	August 5, 1994	Sweden	
Tanya Franck	29	3	May 31, 1997	United States	June 28, 2000	Guatemala	
Martina Franko	55	5	September 1, 2005	Germany	May 25, 2009	United States	
Fabienne Gareau	17	5	December 11, 1987	Hong Kong	April 28, 1991	United States	
Robyn Gayle	81	2	June 25, 2006	Italy	March 9, 2015	Italy	
Suzanne Gerrior	10	0	April 20, 1990	China	June 8, 1995	Nigeria	
**Vanessa Gilles**	54	2	November 10, 2019	New Zealand			
Leslie-Ann Graham	8	0	April 12, 1994	Trinidad and Tobago	May 11, 1995	Australia	
**Julia Grosso**	72	3	November 12, 2017	United States			
Jeanette Haas	7	0	May 21, 1999	Mexico	June 23, 1999	Norway	
Jenny Hafting	12	0	June 3, 1988	Ivory Coast	August 8, 1993	United States	
Isabelle Harvey	44	3	July 19, 1998	China	February 3, 2004	United States	
Linda Hathorn	3	0	July 20, 2003	Brazil	September 4, 2003	Mexico	
Wendy Hawthorne	15	0	April 20, 1990	China	May 13, 1995	Australia	
Kelly Haxton	6	0	May 7, 2000	United States	June 28, 2000	Guatemala	
Brandy Heatherington	1	0	May 13, 1995		Australia		
Janine Helland	47	1	April 20, 1990	China	June 26, 1999	Russia	
**Jenna Hellstrom**	5	0	March 5, 2018	South Korea			
Randee Hermus	113	12	July 23, 1999	Trinidad and Tobago	August 9, 2008	China	
Charmaine Hooper	129	71	July 7, 1986	United States	July 30, 2006	United States	
Michele Houchen	5	2	July 5, 1987	Sweden	December 19, 1987	United States	
**Jordyn Huitema**	88	15	March 8, 2017	Spain			
Selenia Iacchelli	4	0	November 24, 2013	Mexico	November 26, 2014	Sweden	
Aysha Jamani	11	7	January 30, 2004	China	July 30, 2006	United States	
Sarah Joly	17	1	July 4, 1996	Brazil	June 6, 1999	United States	
Christina Julien	54	10	March 5, 2009	New Zealand	March 9, 2015	Italy	
Angela Kelly	29	1	April 16, 1990	Soviet Union	June 10, 1995	Norway	
**Maegan Kelly**	6	0	November 9, 2017	United States			
Kristina Kiss	75	8	March 12, 2000	China	July 27, 2008	Singapore	
Cathy Klein	4	0	July 5, 1987	Sweden	June 8, 1988	Sweden	
Kaylyn Kyle	101	6	January 16, 2008	United States	June 27, 2015	England	
Stephanie Labbé	86	0	July 27, 2008	Singapore			
**Cloé Lacasse**	38	0	November 27, 2021	Mexico			
Alyssa Lagonia	4	0	March 5, 2009	New Zealand	July 22, 2009	United States	
**Alex Lamontagne**	2	0	March 3, 2017	Russia			
Kara Lang	92	34	March 1, 2002	Scotland	November 5, 2010	Costa Rica	
Anne-Marie Lapalme	3	0	March 14, 2000	Norway	March 18, 2000	Denmark	
**Clarissa Larisey**	12	1	September 3, 2022	Australia			
Christine Latham	49	15	May 5, 2000	South Korea	July 30, 2006	United States	
**Ashley Lawrence**	147	7	January 12, 2013	China			
Karina LeBlanc	110	0	July 21, 1998	China	January 13, 2015	Mexico	
Katie Lee	5	0	March 18, 2000	Denmark	March 13, 2001	Sweden	
Vanessa Legault-Cordisco	2	0	April 24, 2010	China	October 20, 2011	Argentina	
Janet Lemieux	6	0	July 7, 1986	United States	December 12, 1987	Australia	
**Adriana Leon**	126	24	January 12, 2013	China			
**Marie Levasseur**	9	0	December 13, 2015	Trinidad and Tobago			
**Jordyn Listro**	2	0	February 21, 2021	Argentina			
Sara Maglio	6	0	May 31, 1997	United States	June 26, 1999	Russia	
Véronique Maranda	12	1	May 19, 2003	England	July 30, 2004	Japan	
Lexi Marton	9	0	March 7, 2008	Japan	September 22, 2011	United States	
Diana Matheson	206	19	March 18, 2003	Norway	March 10, 2020	Brazil	
Brooke McCalla	7	0	April 24, 2010	China	May 28, 2011	Netherlands	
Bryanna McCarthy	6	0	June 3, 2010	Norway	January 16, 2013	Norway	
Joan McEachern	31	2	July 5, 1987	Sweden	May 29, 1995	Denmark	
**Erin McLeod**	119	0	March 3, 2002	Wales			
Shelley McNichol	3	0	July 7, 1986	United States	July 5, 1987	Sweden	
Rachel Melhado	1	0	June 19, 2013		Germany		
Tracy Miernicki	5	0	December 12, 1987	Australia	April 21, 1990	Soviet Union	
Linda Milani	5	0	June 8, 1988	Sweden	July 27, 1990	United States	
Caley Miskimmin	2	0	March 1, 2010	South Africa	April 24, 2010	China	
Luce Mongrain	30	0	December 11, 1987	Hong Kong	June 8, 1995	Nigeria	
Isabelle Morneau	87	6	April 11, 1995	France	November 26, 2006	United States	
Carmelina Moscato	94	2	April 3, 2002	Australia	June 15, 2015	Netherlands	
Alyscha Mottershead	2	0	November 22, 2011	Sweden	January 21, 2012	Cuba	
Suzanne Muir	31	2	April 11, 1995	France	June 9, 1999	Australia	
Marie-Ève Nault	71	0	January 30, 2004	China	February 4, 2017	Mexico	
Andrea Neil	132	24	April 19, 1991	Jamaica	September 15, 2007	Ghana	
Sharolta Nonen	63	1	June 3, 1999	Brazil	July 30, 2006	United States	
Veronica O'Brien	31	1	July 23, 1990	Norway	June 7, 1997	Australia	
**Christabel Oduro**	5	0	January 12, 2013	China	March 11, 2013	Netherlands	
Stephanie O'Neil	4	1	May 31, 1997	United States	January 10, 1999	Australia	
Gina Pacheco	1	0	July 19, 2009		United States		
Kelly Parker	40	3	July 17, 2003	Brazil	August 3, 2012	Great Britain	
**Victoria Pickett**	3	0	November 27, 2021	Mexico			
Amelia Pietrangelo	6	1	December 9, 2010	Netherlands	October 22, 2011	Brazil	
Sally Pirie	2	0	July 7, 1986	United States	July 9, 1986	United States	
Kelley Poole	1	0	May 13, 1995		Australia		
**Nichelle Prince**	107	13	January 12, 2013	China			
**Quinn** (Note: Until 2020 known as Rebecca Quinn)	106	5	March 7, 2014	Italy			
Rachel Quon	4	0	March 5, 2014	Finland	November 26, 2014	Sweden	
Sari Raber	7	0	July 30, 2004	Japan	April 24, 2010	China	
Erin Ramsay	1	0	August 22, 2006		China		
Kathryn Ranheim	2	0	June 10, 1993	Italy	June 21, 1993	United States	
Sue Redepenning-Simon	4	0	July 7, 1986	United States	July 7, 1987	United States	
**Emma Regan**	8	0	October 8, 2018	Cuba			
Michelle Ring	45	2	July 7, 1986	United States	June 10, 1995	Norway	
**Jayde Riviere**	50	1	November 12, 2017	United States			
Jodi-Ann Robinson	56	7	April 21, 2005	Germany	April 7, 2013	England	
Leah Robinson	5	0	February 10, 2001	Morocco	March 10, 2009	Russia	
Tina Romagnuolo	1	0	September 22, 2011		United States		
**Deanne Rose**	88	10	December 9, 2015	Mexico			
**Jade Rose**	27	0	February 21, 2021	Argentina			
Shannon Rosenow	27	11	May 12, 1996	United States	March 18, 2000	Denmark	
Cathy Ross	34	3	July 7, 1986	United States	June 10, 1995	Norway	
Wanda Rozwadowska	9	1	June 10, 2001	Sweden	March 7, 2002	Finland	
Clare Rustad	45	3	July 23, 1999	Trinidad and Tobago	August 15, 2008	United States	
Nadia Salvino	3	0	May 13, 1995	Australia	July 7, 1996	Denmark	
Jaclyn Sawicki	1	0	September 17, 2011		United States		
Shona Schleppe	2	0	April 19, 1991	Jamaica	April 28, 1991	United States	
**Sophie Schmidt**	226	20	April 19, 2005	Netherlands			
**Desiree Scott**	185	0	February 24, 2010	Switzerland			
Nicole Sedgwick	12	0	April 11, 1995	France	July 4, 1996	Brazil	
Carrie Serwetnyk	18	1	July 7, 1986	United States	May 18, 1996	Japan	
**Lauren Sesselmann**	46	0	September 17, 2011	United States	June 27, 2015	England	
**Kailen Sheridan**	57	0	March 7, 2016	Iceland			
Diamond Simpson	4	0	December 9, 2010	Netherlands	October 22, 2011	Brazil	
**Christine Sinclair**	331	190	March 12, 2000	China			
Tania Singfield	5	0	June 21, 1993	United States	May 18, 1996	Japan	
Kylla Sjoman	2	0	April 7, 2013	England	November 24, 2013	Mexico	
Heidi Slaymaker	10	0	April 11, 1995	France	August 2, 1998	United States	
Heather Smith	1	1	March 5, 2002		Portugal		
Liz Smith	22	2	May 15, 1996	China	June 8, 2000	China	
**Olivia Smith**	2	0	November 7, 2019	Brazil			
**Bianca St-Georges**	13	0	June 11, 2021	Czech Republic			
Chelsea Stewart	44	0	March 5, 2009	New Zealand	June 19, 2013	Germany	
Helen Stoumbos	35	1	June 10, 1993	Italy	August 30, 1998	Martinique	
**Sarah Stratigakis**	5	1	February 4, 2017	Mexico			
Taryn Swiatek	24	0	June 10, 2001	Sweden	September 20, 2007	Australia	
Melissa Tancredi	125	27	February 26, 2004	Jamaica	February 4, 2017	Mexico	
Katie Thorlakson	23	2	July 30, 2004	Japan	September 15, 2007	Ghana	
Noel Trépanier	8	0	March 11, 2001	United States	March 5, 2002	Portugal	
Cindy Tye	6	0	March 1, 2002	Scotland	April 9, 2002	Japan	
Lydia Vamos	24	7	April 16, 1990	Soviet Union	August 21, 1994	United States	
Danielle Vella	1	0	March 12, 2000		China		
Amy Vermeulen	12	1	August 26, 2006	France	March 12, 2009	England	
Rachelle Vernon	2	0	June 1, 1988	China	June 5, 1988	Netherlands	
**Évelyne Viens**	37	2	February 18, 2021	United States			
Sue Vriens	20	0	December 11, 1987	Hong Kong	April 28, 1991	United States	
Amy Walsh	102	5	July 19, 1998	China	March 12, 2009	England	
Cindy Walsh	24	0	July 19, 1998	China	March 1, 2010	South Africa	
Katherine Warman	5	0	June 4, 2000	Australia	June 10, 2001	Sweden	
Kim Warner	6	0	November 11, 2000	United States	March 15, 2001	Portugal	
Tracey Watson	2	0	July 7, 1986	United States	July 9, 1986	United States	
Kami Wiebe	2	0	July 19, 1998	China	July 21, 1998	China	
Rhian Wilkinson	181	7	April 26, 2003	United States	February 4, 2017	Mexico	
Janine Willis	10	0	February 10, 2001	Morocco	June 19, 2001	Norway	
**Shannon Woeller**	21	0	March 7, 2009	Netherlands			
Nicci Wright	37	0	May 15, 1996	China	March 1, 2002	Scotland	
Danica Wu	2	0	June 2, 2013	United States	June 19, 2013	Germany	
Stephanie Yarem	2	0	January 6, 1999	Italy	January 10, 1999	Australia	
**Sura Yekka**	15	0	October 30, 2013	South Korea			
**Ariel Young**	1	0	November 12, 2017	United States			
**Shelina Zadorsky**	106	3	January 14, 2013	South Korea			
Emily Zurrer	82	3	July 3, 2004	United States	April 9, 2015	France	
