= Sandra Starke =

Association football player (born 1993)

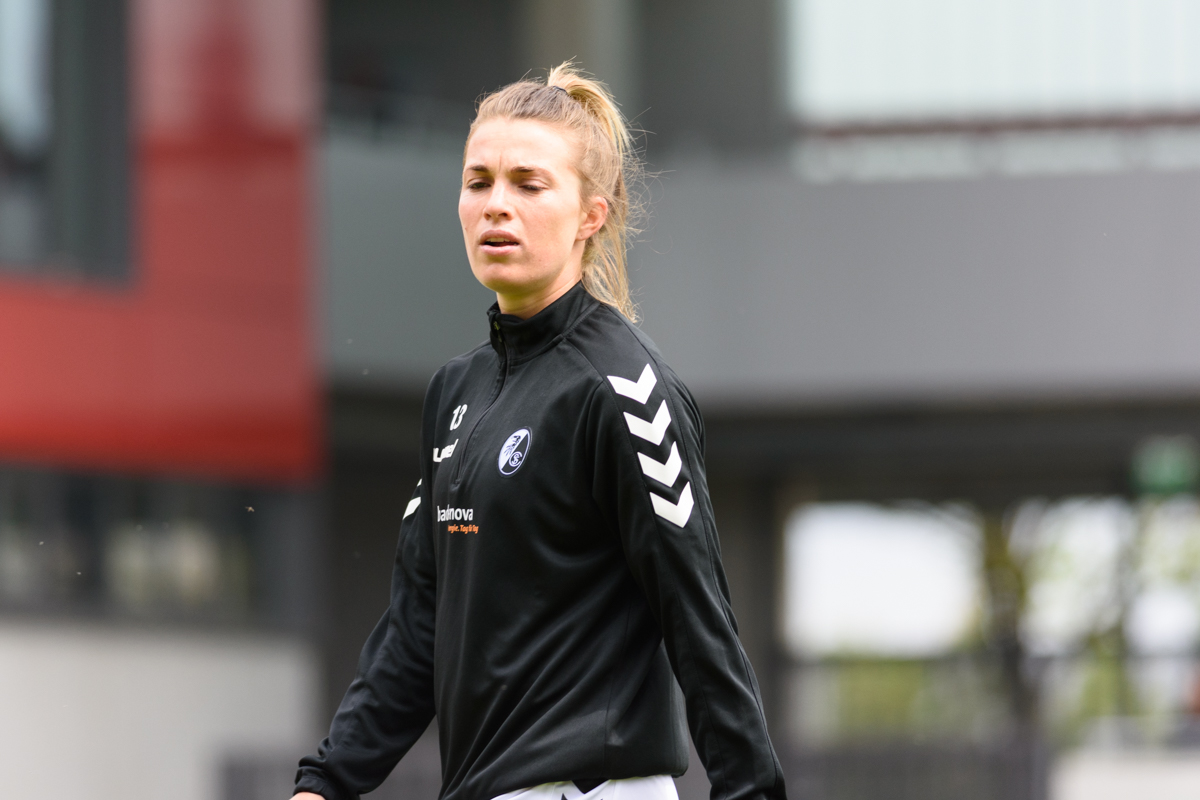
- Starke training with SC Freiburg in 2019

Personal information
- Full name: Sandra Starke
- Date of birth: 31 July 1993 (age 33)
- Place of birth: Windhoek, Namibia
- Height: 1.65 m (5 ft 5 in)
- Position: Forward

Team information
- Current team: RB Leipzig
- Number: 13

Senior career*
Years	Team	Apps	(Gls)
2009–2013	Turbine Potsdam II	81	(36)
2012	Turbine Potsdam	1	(0)
2013–2021	SC Freiburg	152	(41)
2017–2018	SC Freiburg II	4	(0)
2021–2023	VfL Wolfsburg	19	(3)
2021–2023	VfL Wolfsburg II	5	(1)
2023	→ Chicago Red Stars (loan)	7	(0)
2023–	RB Leipzig	52	(3)

International career
2009	Germany U16	4	(1)
2011–2012	Germany U19	2	(0)
2019–2021	Germany	6	(1)
- * Club domestic league appearances and goals as of 22:48, 8 October 2026 (UTC)

Sandra Starke (born 31 July 1993) is a professional footballer who plays as a forward for Frauen-Bundesliga club RB Leipzig. Born in Namibia, she played for the Germany national team.

She was born in Windhoek, Namibia to a Namibian-born German father and a Dutch mother.

== Club career ==
Sandra Starke was born and raised in Namibia and came to Germany at age twelve. On the recommendation of a friend, she went to the "Sportschule Friedrich-Ludwig Jahn", the sports boarding school of the Turbine Potsdam. From 2006 to 2010 she played in the youth teams and won the German B junior championship in 2008, 2009, and 2010. In 2010 she got promoted to the professional squad, but she was mainly used for the second team in the 2. Frauen-Bundesliga North.

Her first-team debut came on 23 November 2012. In the summer of 2013, Starke signed a contract with SC Freiburg. On 14 September 2013 (second matchday) she scored her first Bundesliga goal in the 1–2 defeat in the away game against Bayern Munich with the goal in the 51st minute. In 2017–18 season, Starke was injured but was able to play again in the 2018–19 season and extended her contract with SC Freiburg in February 2019.

In February 2021, Starke signed a three-year contract with VfL Wolfsburg until mid-2024. In April 2023, she joined Chicago Red Stars on loan until 30 June 2023.

In July 2023, Starke signed a contract with RB Leipzig until summer 2025.

== International career ==
For the U16 national team, she played four international matches in the Nordic Cup tournament, for the first time on 29 June 2009 in Hagfors / Sweden in a 3–0 victory over the selection of the Netherlands, when she came on in the 67th minute for Sofia Nati, most recently on 4 July 2009 in the 2–1 defeat by the Swedes. Her only international goal came on 30 June 2009 in Forshaga, 1–0 after 15 minutes in a 6–0 win over the Icelandic team. Starke was in the squad for the U17 national team for the 2010 World Cup, but did not play. Most recently, from 2011 to 2012, she made five appearances for the U19 national team. She made her debut for the senior team in a 5–0 win over Greece on 8 October 2019, scoring her first senior international goal with a 3–0 goal in the 65th minute. She had come on for Linda Dallmann in the second half.

== Personal life ==
On the occasion of World Diabetes Day on 14 November 2020, Starke made her type 1 diabetes public, which was first diagnosed a few years earlier. She is the sister of Namibian international footballer Manfred Starke.

== Career statistics ==
=== Club ===
As of 26 March 2023

Appearances and goals by club, season and competition
Club	Season	League			DFB-Pokal		Continental		Total	
Club	Season	Division	Apps	Goals	Apps	Goals	Apps	Goals	Apps	Goals
Turbine Potsdam II	2009–10	2. Frauen-Bundesliga	20	1	—		—		20	1
Turbine Potsdam II	2010–11	2. Frauen-Bundesliga	18	9	—		—		18	9
Turbine Potsdam II	2011–12	2. Frauen-Bundesliga	22	14	—		—		22	14
Turbine Potsdam II	2012–13	2. Frauen-Bundesliga	21	12	—		—		21	12
Turbine Potsdam II	Total		81	36	0	0	0	0	81	36
Turbine Potsdam	2010–11	Frauen-Bundesliga	0	0	3	0	—		3	0
Turbine Potsdam	2012–13	Frauen-Bundesliga	1	0	0	0	0	0	1	0
Turbine Potsdam	Total		1	0	3	0	0	0	4	0
SC Freiburg	2013–14	Frauen-Bundesliga	17	6	4	2	—		21	8
SC Freiburg	2014–15	Frauen-Bundesliga	21	11	4	2	—		25	13
SC Freiburg	2015–16	Frauen-Bundesliga	21	5	3	1	—		24	6
SC Freiburg	2016–17	Frauen-Bundesliga	21	3	4	1	—		25	4
SC Freiburg	2017–18	Frauen-Bundesliga	8	1	2	0	—		10	1
SC Freiburg	2018–19	Frauen-Bundesliga	21	6	5	5	—		26	11
SC Freiburg	2019–20	Frauen-Bundesliga	22	5	2	2	—		24	7
SC Freiburg	2020–21	Frauen-Bundesliga	21	4	4	2	—		25	6
SC Freiburg	Total		152	41	28	15	—		180	56
SC Freiburg II	2017–18	2. Frauen-Bundesliga	4	0	—		—		4	0
VfL Wolfsburg	2021–22	Frauen-Bundesliga	18	3	2	0	5 (Note: Appearances in UEFA Women's Champions League)	0	25	3
VfL Wolfsburg	2022–23	Frauen-Bundesliga	1	0	1	0	—		2	0
VfL Wolfsburg	Total		19	3	3	0	5	0	27	3
VfL Wolfsburg II	2021–22	2. Frauen-Bundesliga	1	0	—		—		1	0
VfL Wolfsburg II	2022–23	2. Frauen-Bundesliga	4	1	—		—		4	1
VfL Wolfsburg II	Total		5	1	0	0	0	0	5	1
Career total			262	81	34	15	5	0	301	96

=== International ===
Appearances and goals by national team and year
National team	Year	Apps	Goals
Germany
Germany	2019	2	1
Germany	2020	1	0
Germany	2021	3	0
Total	6	1	

Scores and results list Germany's goal tally first, score column indicates score after Starke goal.

List of international goals scored by Sandra Starke
No.	Date	Venue	Opponent	Score	Result	Competition
1	8 October 2019	Kleanthis Vikelidis Stadium, Thessaloniki, Greece	Greece	3–0	5–0	UEFA Women's Euro 2021 qualifying

== Honours ==
VfL Wolfsburg

- Frauen-Bundesliga: 2021–22
- DFB-Pokal Frauen: 2021–22; runner-up: 2018–19

Turbine Potsdam (youth)

- German B Junior Champion: 2008, 2009, 2010
