= Marie-Claude =

Marie-Claude is a French feminine compound given name. Notable people with the name include:

- Marie-Claude Arnaud, French mathematician
- Marie-Claude Asselin, Canadian freestyle skier
- Marie-Claude Audet (born 1962), Canadian cyclist
- Marie-Claude Beaud (1946–2024), French museumist
- Marie-Claude Beaudeau (born 1937), French politician
- Marie-Claude Bibeau (born 1970), Canadian politician
- Marie-Claude Bierre, French figure skater
- Marie-Claude Blais, Canadian politician
- Marie-Claude Bomsel (born 1946), French veterinarian
- Marie-Claude Bourbonnais (born 1979), Canadian model
- Marie-Claude Bouthillier, Canadian artist
- Marie-Claude Chappuis (born 1969), Swiss operatic mezzo-soprano
- Marie-Claude Deslières (born 1966), Canadian water polo player
- Marie-Claude Dion (born 1974), Canadian soccer player
- Marie-Claude Doyon (born 1965), Canadian luger
- Marie-Claude Gaudel, French mathematician and computer scientist
- Marie-Claude Guigue (1832–1889), French historian
- Marie-Claude Mattéi-Müller, French-Venezuelan anthropologist and ethnolinguist
- Marie-Claude Molnar (born 1983), Canadian para-cyclist
- Marie-Claude Monchaux (1933–2021), French children's book writer and illustrator
- Marie-Claude Morin (born 1985), Canadian politician
- Marie Claude Naddaf, Syrian activist
- Marie-Claude Najm (born 1971), Lebanese academic and politician
- Marie-Claude Nichols (born 1973), Canadian politician
- Marie-Claude Pietragalla (born 1963), French dancer and choreographer
- Marie-Claude Sandrin (born 1937), French writer
- Marie-Claude Sarrazin, Quebec politician
- Marie-Claude Savard-Gagnon (born 1972), Canadian pair skater
- Marie-Claude Tjibaou (born 1949), New Caledonian activist and politician
- Marie-Claude Treilhou (born 1948), French film director
- Marie-Claude Vaillant-Couturier (1912–1996), World War II French Resistance member, photojournalist and communist politician
- Marie-Claude Vayssade (1936–2020), French politician
