= 2000 CONCACAF Women's Gold Cup =

Tournament details
- Host country: United States
- Dates: June 23 – July 3
- Teams: 8 (from 3 confederations)
- Venue: 4 (in 4 host cities)

Final positions
- Champions: United States (4th title)
- Runners-up: Brazil
- Third place: China
- Fourth place: Canada

Tournament statistics
- Matches played: 16
- Goals scored: 104 (6.5 per match)
- Top scorer(s): (Brazil) Kátia (8 goals)

The 2000 CONCACAF Women's Gold Cup was the fifth staging of the CONCACAF Women's Gold Cup, and the first after being rebranded as the Women's Gold Cup. Brazil and China PR were guests.

== UNCAF qualifying ==
in Guatemala

| Team | Pts | Pld | W | D | L | GF | GA | GD |
|---|---|---|---|---|---|---|---|---|
| Costa Rica | 7 | 3 | 2 | 1 | 0 | 24 | 5 | +19 |
| Guatemala | 7 | 3 | 2 | 1 | 0 | 16 | 4 | +12 |
| Nicaragua | 3 | 3 | 1 | 0 | 2 | 4 | 16 | −12 |
| Honduras | 0 | 3 | 0 | 0 | 3 | 2 | 21 | −19 |

June 6, 1999

| Costa Rica | 8–1 | Nicaragua |

Guatemala

June 6, 1999

| Guatemala | 6–0 | Honduras |

Guatemala

June 8, 1999

| Honduras | 2–3 | Nicaragua |

Guatemala

June 8, 1999

| Guatemala | 4–4 | Costa Rica |

Guatemala

June 10, 1999

| Costa Rica | 12–0 | Honduras |

Guatemala

June 10, 1999

| Guatemala | 6–0 | Nicaragua |

Guatemala

=== 3rd-place match ===
June 12, 1999

| Nicaragua | 5–4 | Honduras |

Guatemala

=== Final ===
June 12, 1999

| Guatemala | 2–0 | Costa Rica |

Guatemala

Guatemala and Costa Rica qualified for Gold Cup 2000

== Final tournament ==
=== First round ===
==== Group A ====
| Team | Pts | Pld | W | D | L | GF | GA | GD |
|---|---|---|---|---|---|---|---|---|
| United States | 7 | 3 | 2 | 1 | 0 | 19 | 0 | +19 |
| Brazil | 7 | 3 | 2 | 1 | 0 | 19 | 0 | +19 |
| Costa Rica | 1 | 3 | 0 | 1 | 2 | 2 | 18 | −16 |
| Trinidad and Tobago | 1 | 3 | 0 | 1 | 2 | 2 | 24 | −22 |

June 23, 2000

| Brazil | 8–0 | Costa Rica |
|---|---|---|
| Roseli 5', 59'; Formiga 7', 35'; Kátia 52'; Monica 64'; Sissi 79'; Maycon 90+2' |

Hersheypark Stadium, Hershey, Pennsylvania
Attendance: 10,483

June 23, 2000

| United States | 11–0 | Trinidad and Tobago |
|---|---|---|
| Parlow 4', 52', 73'; Fair 22', 23'; Milbrett 34'; Hamm 48', 68'; MacMillan 62'; Whalen 80', 89' |

Hersheypark Stadium, Hershey, Pennsylvania
Attendance: 10,483

June 25, 2000

| Brazil | 11–0 | Trinidad and Tobago |
|---|---|---|
| Kátia 8', 24', 45', 55', 66', 90'; Roseli 17', 18'; Daniela 30'; Cidinha 39' (pen.); Monica 60' |

Cardinal Stadium, Louisville, Kentucky
Attendance: 7,043

June 25, 2000

| Costa Rica | 0–8 | United States |
|---|---|---|
| | | Serlenga 11', 53', 64'; MacMillan 12'; Bush 22'; Welsh 47', 81'; Whalen 83' |

Cardinal Stadium, Louisville, Kentucky
Attendance: 7,043

June 27, 2000

| Trinidad and Tobago | 2–2 | Costa Rica |
|---|---|---|
| Delia De Silva 28'; Natalie Des Vignes 57' | | Briceno 83'; Alvarez 90+2' |

Foxboro Stadium, Foxborough, Massachusetts
Attendance: 16,386

June 27, 2000

| United States | 0–0 | Brazil |

Foxboro Stadium, Foxborough, Massachusetts
Attendance: 16,386

==== Group B ====
| Team | Pts | Pld | W | D | L | GF | GA | GD |
|---|---|---|---|---|---|---|---|---|
| China | 9 | 3 | 3 | 0 | 0 | 20 | 2 | +18 |
| Canada | 6 | 3 | 2 | 0 | 1 | 18 | 6 | +12 |
| Mexico | 3 | 3 | 1 | 0 | 2 | 10 | 7 | +3 |
| Guatemala | 0 | 3 | 0 | 0 | 3 | 0 | 33 | −33 |

June 24, 2000

| China | 14–0 | Guatemala |
|---|---|---|
| Jin 21', 26'; Zhang 31', 41', 48', 79'; Wang 33'; Zhao 40'; Pan 43'; Pu 44'; Liu A. 47'; Shui 64', 77', 88' |

Foxboro Stadium, Foxborough, Massachusetts
Attendance: 6,223

June 24, 2000

| Canada | 4–3 | Mexico |
|---|---|---|
| Sinclair 49', 76'; Walsh 71'; Hooper 87' | | Dominguez 40', 75'; Mora 82' |

Foxboro Stadium, Foxborough, Massachusetts
Attendance: 6,223

June 26, 2000

| Guatemala | 0–7 | Mexico |
|---|---|---|
| | | Dominguez 10', 68', 90+2'; Mora 47', 66', 87', 90+4' |

Hersheypark Stadium, Hershey, Pennsylvania
Attendance: 4,105

June 26, 2000

| China | 3–2 | Canada |
|---|---|---|
| Pan 6'; Zhang 9', 36' | | Hooper 31', 50' (pen.) |

Hersheypark Stadium, Hershey, Pennsylvania
Attendance: 4,105

June 28, 2000

| Canada | 12–0 | Guatemala |
|---|---|---|
| Sinclair 9', 73', 76'; Latham 13', 55' (pen.), 81'; Neil 28' (pen.); Franck 39'; Walsh 61'; Hooper 71', 76'; Kiss 84' |

Cardinal Stadium, Louisville, Kentucky
Attendance: 3,084

June 28, 2000

| Mexico | 0–3 | China |
|---|---|---|
| | | Jin 26'; Pan 86'; Mora 88' (o.g.) |

Cardinal Stadium, Louisville, Kentucky
Attendance: 3,084

=== Knockout stage ===
==== Bracket ====
Semi-finals
July 1
United States | 4
Canada | 1
July 1
China | 2
Brazil | 3

Final
July 3
Brazil | 0
United States | 1
Third place
July 3
China | 2
Canada | 1

==== Semifinals ====
July 1, 2000

| United States | 4–1 | Canada |
|---|---|---|
| MacMillan 12', 38'; Milbrett 45'; Hamm 65' | | Hooper 58' (pen.) |

Cardinal Stadium, Louisville, Kentucky
Attendance: 11,140

July 1, 2000

| China | 2–3 (a.e.t./g.g.) | Brazil |
|---|---|---|
| Shui 9'; Qiu 75' | | Kátia 11'; Roseli 60'; Cidinha 107' (pen.) |

Cardinal Stadium, Louisville, Kentucky
Attendance: 11,140

==== 3rd-place match ====
July 3, 2000

| China | 2–1 | Canada |
|---|---|---|
| Jin 42'; Qiu 73' | | Hooper 59' (pen.) |

Foxboro Stadium, Foxborough, Massachusetts
Attendance: 20,123

==== Final ====
July 3, 2000

| Brazil | 0–1 | United States |
|---|---|---|
| | | Milbrett 44' |

Foxboro Stadium, Foxborough, Massachusetts
Attendance: 20,123

== Awards ==
2000 Women's Gold Cup winners

United States
Fourth title

== Goalscorers ==
There were 104 goals scored in 16 matches, for an average of 6.5 goals per match.

8 goals

- (Brazil) Kátia

7 goals

- (Canada) Charmaine Hooper

6 goals

- (China) Zhang Ouying

5 goals

- (Brazil) Roseli
- (Canada) Christine Latham
- (Canada) Christine Sinclair
- (Mexico) Maribel Dominguez
- (Mexico) Iris Mora

4 goals

- (China) Jin Yan
- (China) Shui Qingxia
- (United States) Shannon MacMillan

3 goals

- (China) Pan Lina
- (United States) Cindy Parlow
- (United States) Mia Hamm
- (United States) Nikki Serlenga
- (United States) Sara Whalen
- (United States) Tiffeny Milbrett

2 goals

- (Brazil) Cidinha
- (Brazil) Forminga
- (Brazil) Monica
- (Canada) Amy Walsh
- (China) Qiu Haiyan
- (United States) Christie Welsh
- (United States) Lorrie Fair

1 goal

- (Brazil) Daniela
- (Brazil) Sissi
- (Brazil) Maycon
- (Canada) Andrea Neil
- (Canada) Kristina Kiss
- (Canada) Tanya Franck
- (China) Liu Ailing
- (China) Pu Wei
- (China) Wang Liping
- (China) Zhao Lihong
- (Costa Rica) Xiomara Briceno
- (Costa Rica) Jacqueline Alvarez
- (Trinidad and Tobago) Delia de Silva
- (Trinidad and Tobago) Natalie des Vignes
- (United States) Susan Bush

1 own goal

- (Mexico) Iris Mora (against China)
