= Montreal Xtreme =

- Nickname: the Xtreme
- Founded: 2004
- Stadium: Soccerplexe Catalogna at Lachine, Quebec
- Capacity: 1400 fans
- Chairman: David Craig
- Coach: Alexandre Da Rocha
- League: USL W-League
- 2004: 2nd, North Central Division, Playoff finalist in Eastern Conference Championship

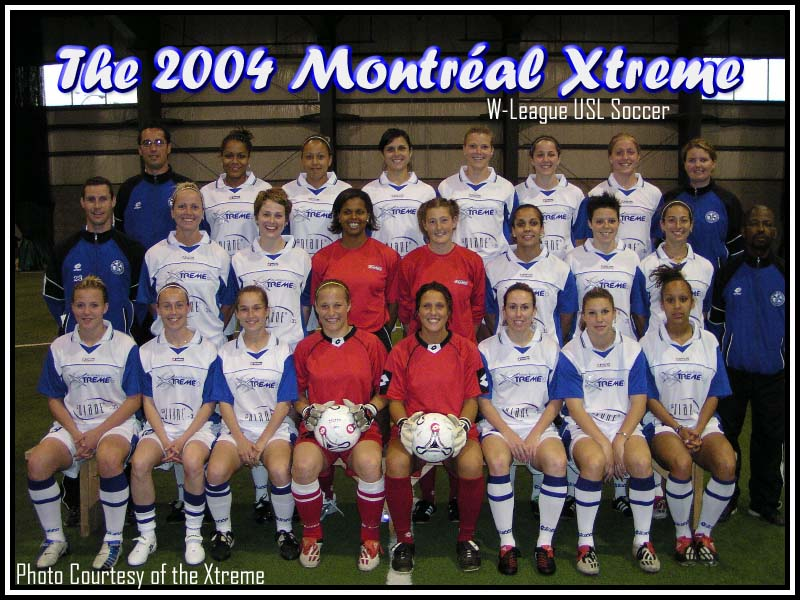
the Xtreme

The Montreal Xtreme were a women's soccer club based in Montreal, Quebec, Canada. They played only the 2004 season in the W-League. The team played its home games in Soccerplexe Catalogna in Lachine, Quebec. The team's colours were blue and white. The team folded after the 2004 season.

== 2004 squad ==
Note: Flags indicate national team as defined under FIFA eligibility rules; some limited exceptions apply. Players may hold more than one non-FIFA nationality.

No.	Pos.	Nation	Player
1	GK	CAN	Sabrina Mariani
3	GK	CAN	Marie-Pier Bilodeau
23	GK	CAN	Karina LeBlanc
25	GK	CAN	Stacey Vanboxmeer
3	DF	CAN	Marie-Emilie Perreault-Morier
5	DF	CAN	Sharolta Nonen
9	DF	CAN	Justine Labrecque
11	DF	CAN	Marie-Ève Nault
16	DF	CAN	Myriam Gousse
18	DF	CAN	Juliana DiPlacido
19	DF	CAN	Marie-Claude Pinard
20	DF	CAN	Katie Radchuck
21	DF	CAN	Sara Walsh
26	DF	CAN	Morag Mitchell-Carvalho
27	DF	CAN	Catherine Chagnon-Beulieu

No.	Pos.	Nation	Player
4	MF	CAN	Erin Holland
6	MF	CAN	Caroline Vanderpool
8	MF	CAN	Véronique Maranda
13	MF	CAN	Amy Walsh
17	MF	CAN	Anne-Marie Lapalme
20	MF	CAN	Melisa Barile
19	MF	CAN	Patricia Bourcier
7	FW	CAN	Isabelle Morneau
10	FW	CAN	Melissa Lesage
12	FW	CAN	Kelly Hemsley
14	FW	CAN	Josée Bélanger
18	FW	CAN	Bonnie Walsh
20	FW	CAN	Caroline Vaillancourt
26	FW	CAN	Melissa Casimir

== Staff ==
- Montreal Xtreme's owner and president: David Craig
- Head coach: Alexandre Da Rocha
- Assistant coach: Lyonel Joseph
- Assistant coach (goalkeepers): Owen Braun

== Notable players ==
- Karina LeBlanc, member of the Canada national team.
- Sharolta Nonen, former member of the Canada national team.
- Marie-Ève Nault, member of the Canada national team.
- Amy Walsh, member of the Canada national team.
- Véronique Maranda, member of the Canada national team.
- Isabelle Morneau, member of the Canada national team.
- Josée Bélanger, member of the Canada national team.
- Stacey Van Boxmeer, member of the Canada national team.

== Season standing ==
Year	League	Regular season	Playoffs
2004	USL W-League	2nd, North Central Division	Finalist in Eastern Conference Championship

=== North Central Division regular season ===
Place	Team	P	W	L	T	GF	GA	GD	Points
1	Ottawa Fury Women	14	13	1	0	68	7	+61	39
2	Montreal Xtreme	14	11	3	0	57	19	+38	33
3	Rochester Ravens	14	8	6	0	33	26	+7	24
4	Toronto Inferno	14	3	11	0	13	38	+25	9
5	Sudbury Canadians	14	1	13	0	15	77	-62	3

== Match by match ==
May 2004

- Sunday May 23 5:00 pm Toronto Inferno 1:4 Montreal Xtrem at Soccerplex Catalogna, Attendance: 1634
- Saturday May 29 2:00 pm Sudbury Canadians 0:4 Montreal Xtreme at Soccerplex Catalogna, Attendance: 1170

June 2004

- Saturday Jun 5 3:00 pm Montreal Xtreme 7:0 Sudbury Canadians at Cambrian College, Attendance: 429
- Sunday June 13 2:00 pm Boston Renegades 4:1 Montreal Xtreme at Soccerplex Catalogna, Attendance: 1240
- Friday June 18 7:30 pm Montreal Xtreme 2:1 Western Mass Lady Pioneers at Lusitano Stadium, Attendance: 726
- Sunday June 20 6:00 pm New York Magic 0:5 Montreal Xtreme at Claude Robillard Sports Complex, Attendance: 831
- Wednesday June 23 6:00 pm Montreal Xtreme 1:2 Ottawa Fury at Keith Harris Stadium, Attendance: 900
- Saturday June 26 4:00 pm New Hampshire Lady Phantoms 0:7 Montreal Xtreme at Soccerplex Catalogna

July 2004

- Friday July 2 6:30 pm Montreal Xtreme 3:2 Rochester Ravens at Rochester Institute of Technology, Attendance: 157
- Saturday July 3 7:00 pm Montreal Xtreme 1:0 Toronto Inferno at Ontario Soccer Centre, Attendance: 420
- Sunday July 11 5:00 pm Montreal Xtreme 10:1 Rhode Island Lady Stingrays at Pierce Memorial, Attendance: 102
- Sunday July 18 2:00 pm Rochester Ravens 0:4 Montreal Xtreme at Soccerplex Catalogna, Attendance: 1357
- Wednesday July 21 7:00 pm Ottawa Fury 2:3 Montreal Xtreme at Soccerplex Catalogna, Attendance: 1056
- Saturday July 24 7:30 pm Montreal Xtreme 5:6 Long Island Lady Riders at Stony Brook University Stadium, Attendance: 924

=== Playoffs 2004 Eastern Conference ===
Division Finals
NWE1	(Massachusetts) Boston Renegades (AET)	1
NWE2	(Massachusetts) Western Mass Lady Pioneers	0
NC1	(Quebec) Montreal Xtreme	3
NC2	(New York (state)) Rochester Ravens	0
NE2	(New York (state)) Long Island Lady Riders (AET)	1
NE3	New Jersey Lady Stallions	0

Eastern Semifinals
NE1	New Jersey Wildcats	2
NWE1	(Massachusetts) Boston Renegades	0
NC1	(Quebec) Montreal Xtreme (AET)	6
NE2	(New York (state)) Long Island Lady Riders	5

Eastern Championship
NE1	New Jersey Wildcats	6
NC1	(Quebec) Montreal Xtreme	5

Divisional round match

July 28, 2004
5:00 PM EDT

(New York (state)) Rochester Lady Rhinos	0–3	(Quebec) Montreal Xtreme
Vieira (yellow card) 14'	Report	Bilodeau (yellow card) 41'; Morneau 45'; Le Palme 51'; Holland 81'

Soccerplexe Catalogna
Montreal, Quebec
Attendance: 647
Referee: Carole Anne Chenara (USA)

Conference semifinal match

July 31, 2004
5:00 PM EDT

(Quebec) Montreal Xtreme	5–4 (AET)	(New York (state)) Long Island Lady Riders
Lesage 6' 17'; Vanderpool 41' 57'; Bilodeau (yellow card) 69'; None (yellow card) 77'; Pinard 117'	Report	McCabe 4'; Mustonen 8'; O'Brien 26'; Stansfield 35'; DeCristoforo (yellow card) 63'; Mullen (yellow card) 74'

Mercer County Community College
West Windsor, New Jersey
Attendance: 676
Referee: Teri O'Connor (USA)

Conference final match

August 1, 2004
5:00 EDT

(Quebec) Montreal Xtreme	5–6	New Jersey Wildcats
Walsh 45'; Vaillancourt 47' 55' 90'; Pinard (yellow card) 48'; Hemsley 66'	Report	Pichon 16' 21' 44' (yellow card) 79' (goal) 85' 89'; Makoski 65'

Mercer County Community College
West Windsor, New Jersey
Attendance: 645
Referee: Hossam Saad (USA)

== External news story ==
- "Montreal Xtreme Launch Inaugural Season In the W-League". Canada Soccer. January 14, 2004. Archived from the original on November 21, 2010.
- "Leblanc And Morneau Sign With Xtreme". Canada Soccer. May 17, 2004.
