= 2010–11 Frauen-Bundesliga =

Frauen-Bundesliga
- Season: 2010–11
- Champions: Turbine Potsdam
- Relegated: Saarbrücken, Herford
- UEFA Women's Champions League: Potsdam, Frankfurt
- Matches: 132
- Goals: 550 (4.17 per match)
- Top goalscorer: Conny Pohlers (25)
- Biggest home win: 9–0 Frankfurt v Saarbrücken, Duisburg v Leverkusen
- Biggest away win: 0–8 Bad Neuenahr v Frankfurt, Essen- Schönebeck v Frankfurt, Herford v Wolfsburg
- Highest scoring: 8–2 Frankfurt v München
- Highest attendance: 7,000 Potsdam v Essen- Schönebeck
- Lowest attendance: 78 Hamburg v Saarbrücken
- Average attendance: 836

The 2010–11 season of the Frauen-Bundesliga was the 21st season of Germany's premier women's football league. The season started on 15 August 2010 and ended early on 13 March 2011, so that the German national team has time to prepare for the 2011 FIFA Women's World Cup. At the end of the season Turbine Potsdam won their third consecutive championship. Saarbrücken and Herford were relegated.

== Changes from 2009–10 ==
For this season, the league runner-up gained direct entry to the UEFA Women's Champions League Round of 32. In the preceding year the runner-up had to start in the qualifying round.

== Teams ==
The teams promoted from last season's 2nd Bundesliga were Bayer 04 Leverkusen as winners of the South division and Herforder SC as winners of the North division.

Locations of teams in the 2010–11 Bundesliga

Team	Home city	Home ground
SC 07 Bad Neuenahr	Bad Neuenahr-Ahrweiler	Apollinarisstadion
FCR 2001 Duisburg	Duisburg	PCC-Stadion
SG Essen-Schönebeck	Essen	Sportpark Am Hallo
1. FFC Frankfurt	Frankfurt	Stadion am Brentanobad
Hamburger SV	Hamburg	Wolfgang-Meyer-Sportanlage
Herforder SC	Herford	Friedrich-Ludwig-Jahn-Stadion
FF USV Jena	Jena	Sportzentrum Oberaue
Bayer 04 Leverkusen	Leverkusen	Kurt-Rieß-Anlage
FC Bayern Munich	Munich	Sportpark Aschheim
1. FFC Turbine Potsdam	Potsdam	Karl-Liebknecht-Stadion
1. FC Saarbrücken	Saarbrücken	Stadion Kieselhumes
VfL Wolfsburg	Wolfsburg	VfL-Stadium

=== Managerial changes ===
Team	Outgoing manager	Manner of departure	Date of vacancy	Replaced by	Date of appointment	Table
Essen-Schönebeck	Ralf Agolli	resigned	11 May 2010	Markus Högner	25 May 2010	pre-season
Herford	Tanja Schulte	sacked	15 October 2010	Jürgen Prüfer	16 October 2010	12th
Jena	Torsten Zaunmüller	sacked	4 November 2010	Konrad Weise	29 December 2010	11th
Saarbrücken	Stephan Fröhlich	resigned	4 February 2011	Tobias Jungfleisch	5 February 2011	10th
Duisburg	Martina Voss-Tecklenburg	sacked	17 February 2011	Marco Ketelaer	17 February 2011	3rd

== Standings ==
Pos	Team	Pld	W	D	L	GF	GA	GD	Pts	Qualification or relegation
1	Turbine Potsdam (C)	22	19	1	2	67	17	+50	58	2011–12 UEFA Champions League Round of 32
2	FFC Frankfurt	22	19	0	3	103	16	+87	57	2011–12 UEFA Champions League Round of 32
3	FCR 2001 Duisburg	22	16	3	3	61	19	+42	51	
4	Hamburg	22	12	2	8	42	42	0	38	
5	Bayern Munich	22	11	2	9	43	36	+7	35	
6	Bad Neuenahr	22	11	0	11	54	48	+6	33	
7	Wolfsburg	22	10	2	10	52	46	+6	32	
8	Bayer Leverkusen	22	6	3	13	32	67	−35	21	
9	Essen-Schönebeck	22	5	5	12	27	50	−23	20	
10	Jena	22	5	4	13	24	57	−33	19	
11	Saarbrücken (R)	22	4	2	16	20	72	−52	14	Relegation to 2011–12 2. Bundesliga
12	Herford (R)	22	1	2	19	25	80	−55	5	Relegation to 2011–12 2. Bundesliga

Updated to match(es) played on 13 March 2011. Source: dfb.de (in German)
Rules for classification: 1) points; 2) goal difference; 3) number of goals scored.
(C) Champions; (R) Relegated

== Results ==
Home \ Away	POT	FFC	FCR	HSV	MUN	NEU	WOL	LEV	ESS	JEN	SAA	HER
1. FFC Turbine Potsdam		1–0	3–0	4–1	2–1	1–0	4–0	6–1	3–0	5–0	7–0	1–0
1. FFC Frankfurt	4–1		0–1	5–1	8–2	4–1	5–1	5–1	6–0	5–0	9–0	6–0
FCR 2001 Duisburg	1–1	1–2		2–2	2–1	2–0	2–1	9–0	3–1	1–0	5–0	4–0
Hamburger SV	0–1	0–4	1–5		2–1	0–3	2–1	0–1	1–0	2–2	3–1	3–0
Bayern Munich	0–3	0–2	2–4	1–4		1–2	2–1	4–0	1–1	5–0	4–0	3–2
SC 07 Bad Neuenahr	2–5	0–8	0–2	2–6	0–1		1–2	5–1	4–3	2–1	6–0	5–1
Wolfsburg	2–1	4–3	3–2	2–3	0–0	1–4		3–3	1–0	1–2	4–0	6–3
Bayer 04 Leverkusen	1–7	0–4	2–3	4–1	1–2	1–4	3–2		1–1	0–4	0–1	5–1
SG Essen-Schönebeck	1–4	0–8	0–2	1–3	1–2	2–1	3–2	1–1		1–2	3–1	4–2
FF USV Jena	2–3	0–3	2–2	0–1	0–4	0–7	1–4	0–3	0–0		1–3	2–1
1. FC Saarbrücken	0–2	1–4	0–3	1–3	0–5	2–3	2–3	2–0	1–3	1–1		2–2
Herforder SV	1–2	0–7	0–5	1–3	0–2	4–2	0–8	2–3	1–1	3–4	1–2	

Legend: Blue = home team win; Yellow = draw; Red = away team win.

== Top scorers ==
Conny Pohlers scored six goals in the last two games to overtake the opposition and won the individual scorer award a third time after 2002 and 2006.

Rank	Player	Team	Goals
1	(Germany) Conny Pohlers	FFC Frankfurt	25
2	(Germany) Inka Grings	Duisburg	23
	(Germany) Kerstin Garefrekes	FFC Frankfurt	23
	(Germany) Birgit Prinz	FFC Frankfurt	23
5	(Germany) Martina Müller	Wolfsburg	20
6	(Germany) Célia Okoyino da Mbabi	SC 07 Bad Neuenahr	17
7	(Germany) Anja Mittag	Turbine Potsdam	15
8	(Equatorial Guinea) Genoveva Añonma	FF USV Jena	13
	(Germany) Fatmire Bajramaj	Turbine Potsdam	13
