= 2014–15 Frauen-Bundesliga =

Frauen-Bundesliga
- Season: 2014–15
- Champions: Bayern Munich
- Relegated: Herforder SV; MSV Duisburg
- Champions League: Bayern Munich; VfL Wolfsburg
- Matches: 132
- Goals: 455 (3.45 per match)
- Top goalscorer: Célia Šašić (21 goals)

The 2014–15 season of the Frauen-Bundesliga was the 25th season of Germany's premier women's football league. The season began on 30 August 2014 and ended on 10 May 2015. VfL Wolfsburg were the defending champions.

This season was the first to be sponsored by a company. Allianz bought the rights and the league is known as the Allianz-Frauen Bundesliga. As a direct result, each team got €100,000 per season.

Bayern Munich won the Bundesliga title for the first time, and their second German championship overall.

== Teams ==
The teams promoted from the previous 2. Bundesliga season were SC Sand as winners of the Southern division and Herforder SV as winners of the Northern division. BV Cloppenburg and VfL Sindelfingen were relegated.

Locations of teams in the 2014–15 Fußball-Bundesliga

Team	Home city	Home ground
Bayer 04 Leverkusen	Leverkusen	Ulrich-Haberland-Stadion (Amateur)
SC Sand	Willstätt	Kühnmatt-Stadion
FC Bayern Munich	Munich	Sportpark Aschheim
MSV Duisburg	Duisburg	PCC-Stadion
SGS Essen	Essen	Stadion Essen
1. FFC Frankfurt	Frankfurt	Stadion am Brentanobad
SC Freiburg	Freiburg	Möslestadion
TSG 1899 Hoffenheim	Hoffenheim	Rhein-Neckar-Arena
FF USV Jena	Jena	Sportzentrum Oberaue
Herforder SV	Herford	Friedrich-Ludwig-Jahn-Stadion
1. FFC Turbine Potsdam	Potsdam	Karl-Liebknecht-Stadion
VfL Wolfsburg	Wolfsburg	VfL-Stadium (1st half); AOK Stadion (2nd half)

== League table ==
Frankfurt also qualified for the Champions League as title holders.

Pos	Team	Pld	W	D	L	GF	GA	GD	Pts	Promotion, qualification or relegation
1	Bayern Munich (C, Q)	22	17	5	0	56	7	+49	56	Qualification for Champions League
2	Wolfsburg (Q)	22	17	4	1	67	4	+63	55	Qualification for Champions League
3	FFC Frankfurt (Q)	22	17	2	3	74	19	+55	53	Qualification for Champions League
4	Turbine Potsdam	22	15	3	4	52	24	+28	48	
5	SGS Essen	22	8	4	10	32	36	−4	28	
6	1899 Hoffenheim	22	7	5	10	29	40	−11	26	
7	Freiburg	22	7	2	13	34	62	−28	23	
8	Jena	22	4	8	10	25	40	−15	20	
9	Bayer Leverkusen	22	5	5	12	23	42	−19	20	
10	SC Sand	22	5	4	13	27	43	−16	19	
11	MSV Duisburg (R)	22	3	8	11	18	49	−31	17	Relegation to 2. Bundesliga
12	Herford (R)	22	1	2	19	18	89	−71	5	Relegation to 2. Bundesliga

Source: kicker.de
Rules for classification: 1) Points; 2) Goal difference; 3) Goals scored
(C) Champions; (Q) Qualified for the phase indicated; (R) Relegated

|note_FRA=FFC Frankfurt qualified for the Champions League as title holders.

== Results ==
Home \ Away	BAY	DUI	ESS	FRE	FRA	HSV	HOF	JEN	LEV	POT	SCS	WOL
Bayern Munich		6–0	2–0	5–0	1–1	7–0	3–0	2–1	2–0	1–0	3–0	0–0
MSV Duisburg	0–0		1–2	0–2	0–4	4–0	0–4	1–1	2–0	3–3	1–1	0–3
SGS Essen	0–0	0–0		5–1	1–3	2–0	1–3	1–2	1–0	0–1	2–2	0–4
Freiburg	1–2	2–2	1–4		2–4	2–3	1–0	3–0	2–3	2–4	3–2	0–2
FFC Frankfurt	1–2	6–0	3–1	7–0		6–1	4–0	4–1	3–0	5–1	3–0	1–1
Herford	0–6	1–2	0–5	2–3	0–5		2–3	0–2	2–2	1–3	1–3	0–7
1899 Hoffenheim	1–2	1–0	3–1	2–2	1–7	3–0		1–1	1–1	1–3	1–0	0–1
Jena	1–4	1–1	1–1	0–2	1–2	3–3	1–1		1–2	2–3	3–1	0–4
Bayer Leverkusen	0–4	0–0	2–3	5–1	1–2	3–0	1–1	0–1		1–6	0–1	0–3
Turbine Potsdam	0–1	1–0	3–1	6–1	2–1	4–0	3–0	3–1	0–0		2–0	2–0
SC Sand	1–2	4–1	0–1	1–3	1–2	4–2	3–2	1–1	1–2	1–1		0–4
Wolfsburg	0–0	7–0	4–0	3–0	2–0	10–0	3–0	0–0	5–0	2–1	2–0	

Updated to match(es) played on 10 May 2015. Source: kicker.de
Legend: Blue = home team win; Yellow = draw; Red = away team win.

== Scorers ==
=== Top scorers ===
As of end of season

Célia Šašić defended her top-scorer title from last year.

Rank	Scorer	Club	Goals
1	(Germany) Célia Šašić	1. FFC Frankfurt	21
2	(Germany) Kerstin Garefrekes	1. FFC Frankfurt	15
3	(Germany) Alexandra Popp	VfL Wolfsburg	13
4	(Germany) Martina Müller	VfL Wolfsburg	11
4	(Germany) Sandra Starke	SC Freiburg	11
6	(Equatorial Guinea) Genoveva Añonma	Turbine Potsdam	10
7	(United States) Katie Stengel	Bayern Munich	9
8	(Germany) Eunice Beckmann	Bayern Munich	8
8	(Germany) Dzsenifer Marozsán	1. FFC Frankfurt	8
8	(Italy) Ilaria Mauro	SC Sand	8
8	(Germany) Christine Veth	SC Sand	8
