= Sjöman =

Sjöman is a Swedish surname literally meaning "seaman". Notable people with the surname include:

- Rosalie Sjöman (1833–1919), Swedish photographer
- Tord Sjöman
- Vilgot Sjöman (1924–2006), Swedish writer and film director
- Kylla Sjoman (born 1987), Canadian soccer player
- Norman Sjoman
