= Danica Wu =

Canadian soccer player

Danica Wu 胡嘉兒
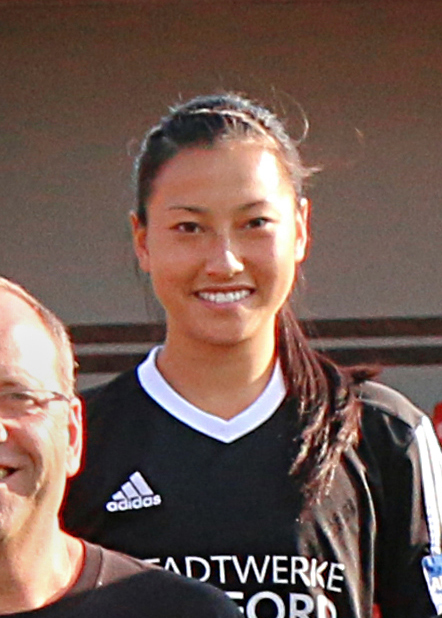

Personal information
- Full name: Danica Joelle Wu, 胡嘉兒 (Wu Ka-Yee)
- Place of birth: Edmonton, Alberta, Canada
- Height: 5 ft 2 in (1.57 m)
- Position: Midfielder

College career
Years	Team	Apps	(Gls)
2010–2013	Ohio State Buckeyes	76	(5)

Senior career*
Years	Team	Apps	(Gls)
2009–2013	Laval Comets		
2014	Ottawa Fury		
2014–2015	Herforder SV	21	(0)
2015–2018	MSV Duisburg	52	(2)
2018–2019	SGS Essen	21	(3)

International career^{‡}
2008	Canada U17	8	(0)
2012	Canada U20	6	(0)
2015	Canada U23	6	(0)
2013	Canada	2	(0)
- * Club domestic league appearances and goals as of December 28, 2017 ‡ National team caps and goals as of July 29, 2015

Danica Joelle Wu is a retired Canadian soccer midfielder who last played for German Frauen-Bundesliga side SGS Essen and played for Ohio State Buckeyes (collegiately) and for the Laval Comets in the W-League and was also a member of the Canada women's national soccer team.

== Early life ==
=== Ohio State University ===
As a freshman in 2010

- played 24 matches, started in 21 matches
- scored two goals and made 2 assists
- Big Ten All-Freshman team
- Ohio State University Scholar-Athlete.

As a sophomore in 2011

- started 22 matches
- scored 2 goals, and made 4 assists
- second team All-Big Ten
- All-Great Lakes Region
- Academic All-Big Ten
- Ohio State University Scholar-Athlete.

As a junior in 2012

- played 12 games after missing the start of the season playing for Canada at the U-20 Women's World Cup and the final six games with a broken leg.
- first team All-Big Ten
- Academic All-Big Ten
- Ohio State University Scholar-Athlete.

As a senior in 2013

- played 18 matches, started in 18 matches
- Academic All-Big Ten
- Ohio State University Scholar-Athlete.

== Youth playing career ==
Wu captained Alberta provincial team in Canada Summer Games and was selected to the all-star team during those games. She won a bronze medal with Canada's U17 team at the 2008 CONCACAF Women's Under-17 Championship, and was nominated Canadian U-17 player of the year in 2007 and 2008. She won a silver medal with the U20 team at the 2012 CONCACAF Women's Under-20 Championship, and was nominated Canadian U-20 player of the year in 2012. Wu played in all three group-stage matches team Canada played in 2012 FIFA U-20 Women's World Cup. Noted by the FIFA U-20 Women's World Cup Technical Study Group as "playmaker with great vision, good ball recovery and distribution skills, hard-working player in defence and attack".

== International ==
Wu made her debut for the Canada women's national soccer team on June 2, 2013, against the United States, at BMO Field in Toronto. The match was referred to as a rematch of a 2012 Olympics semi-final match.

== Personal ==
Wu speaks English and Cantonese. Her father was born in Hong Kong while her mother was born in Medicine Hat, Alberta. She grew up participating in skiing, snowboarding, taekwondo, hockey and swimming. Wu attended Ohio State University beginning in 2010, and has graduated.
