= Marie-Ève Nault =

Canadian soccer player

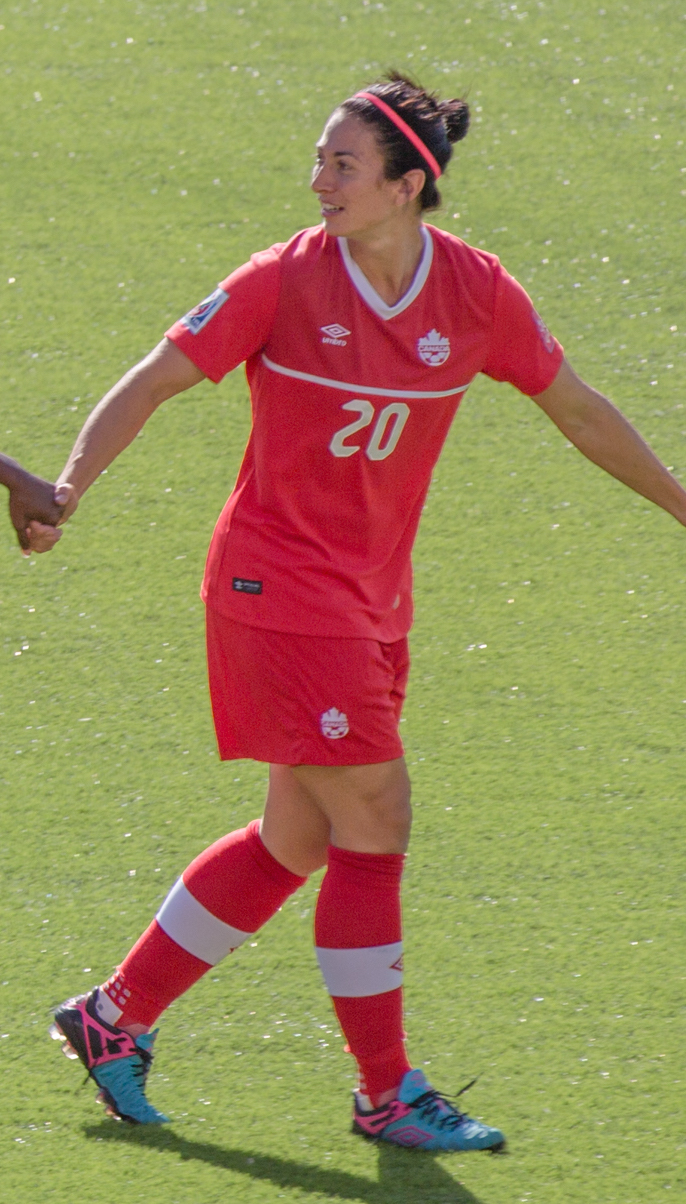

Personal information
- Date of birth: February 16, 1982 (age 44)
- Place of birth: Trois-Rivières, Quebec, Canada
- Height: 1.69 m (5 ft 7 in)
- Position: Defender

College career
Years	Team	Apps	(Gls)
2000–2002	Tennessee Lady Volunteers		

Senior career*
Years	Team	Apps	(Gls)
2003	Ottawa Fury		
2004	Montreal Xtreme	12	(2)
2005	Saint-Étienne	2	(0)
2006–2007	Ottawa Fury	20	(1)
2008	F.C. Indiana	14	(0)
2009	Chicago Red Eleven	10	(3)
2010	Ottawa Fury	9	(0)
2013–2016	KIF Örebro	77	(1)

International career^{‡}
2004–2016	Canada	70	(0)
Medal record
Olympic Games
Bronze medal – third place	2012 London	Team competition
- * Club domestic league appearances and goals as of 15:18, October 3, 2015 (UTC) ‡ National team caps and goals as of 17:17, 16 January 2016 (UTC)

Marie-Ève Nault (born February 16, 1982), is a Canadian former soccer player who played as defender. She is also a former player of the Ottawa Fury Women. She represented Canada women's national soccer team at the 2012 Summer Olympics, which won the bronze medal.

== Club career ==
In January 2013, Nault signed a one-year contract with Swedish Damallsvenskan club KIF Örebro. She had been without a club since 2010, after her third stint with the Ottawa Fury ended. Nault initially agreed to play for Quebec City Amiral SC in 2012 if she was not selected to the Olympic team. She was included in Canada's training camp in April and was later selected as an alternate player. She resigned for KIF Örebro DFF for the 2015 season.

== International career ==
Nault made her first appearance for the Canada national team on January 24, 2004, against China in the 2004 Four Nations Tournament. She represented Canada in the 2011 FIFA Women's World Cup, playing in two games against Germany and Nigeria.

At the 2012 Olympics, head coach John Herdman initially selected Nault as an alternate, excluding her from the 18-woman squad. However, after Robyn Gayle and Emily Zurrer were injured in the group stage, Nault and fellow alternate Melanie Booth were selected as replacements. She would play in all of Canada's remaining matches, including their bronze medal-winning match against France.

Nault retired from international football on January 13, 2017.
