= Holly Lincoln =

Canadian soccer player

Personal information
- Full name: Holly Lincoln
- Date of birth: June 23, 1985 (age 41)
- Place of birth: Scarborough, Ontario, Canada
- Height: 1.73 m (5 ft 8 in)
- Position: Defender

Youth career
- 2003–2006: Penn State Nittany Lions

Senior career*
Years	Team	Apps	(Gls)
- Toronto Lady Lynx

International career
2003	Canada U23	3	(0)
Medal record
Women's soccer
Representing Canada
Pan American Games
Silver medal – second place	2003 Santo Domingo	Team
- * Club domestic league appearances and goals

Holly Lincoln (born June 23, 1985) is a Canadian soccer forward, who won the silver medal with the Canadian national team at the 2003 Pan American Games.
