= Patricia Bourcier =

Canadian soccer player

Personal information
- Date of birth: August 15, 1979 (age 47)
- Place of birth: Lévis, Quebec, Canada
- Position: Defender

College career
Years	Team	Apps	(Gls)
1999–2004	Laval Rouge et Or		

Senior career*
Years	Team	Apps	(Gls)
2001	Laval Dynamites		
2003	Ottawa Fury	12	(0)
2004	Montreal Xtreme	2	(0)

International career
2002	Canada	1	(0)
- * Club domestic league appearances and goals

Patricia Bourcier (born August 15, 1979) is a Canadian retired soccer player who played as a defender. She made one international appearance for the Canadian national team.

== College career ==
Bourcier attended Laval University, where she studied physical education, and played as a defender for the Rouge et Or from 1999 to 2004.

As a rookie, she received FSSQ First Team All-Star honours. In 2000 and 2001, she was named to the CIS All-Canadian First Team and to the FSSQ First Team All-Star. In her fourth season with the team, she was named to the CIS All-Canadian Second Team as well as the CIS Tournament All-Star Team. She also received FSSQ First Team All-Star honours for the fourth straight year, and FSSQ Athlete of the week honours in November. She missed the 2003 season due to a knee injury, but returned for the 2004 season.

== Club career ==
In 2001, Bourcier joined the Laval Dynamites in the USL W-League. In 2003, she played for the Ottawa Fury, where she made 12 appearances, recording one assist. The following year, she signed with the Montreal Xtreme, but only made two appearances for the club.

In 2005, after finishing university, Bourcier joined the Dynamo de Quebec in the LSEQ. She was a member of the side that won the Jubilee Trophy in 2007. That year, she was also nominated for the LSEQ Best Player (Meilleure Joueuse) award. She later joined Chaudière-Ouest, where she played AAA soccer for almost twelve years, until 2018. In September 2018, she was appointed as an ambassador for the club.

== International career ==
In January 2002, Bourcier was invited to attend the Canadian national team training camp in Ottawa. The following month, she joined the team for the 2002 Algarve Cup. On March 1, at the age of 22, she made her first and only international appearance in a 3–0 win over Scotland at the Estádio Municipal de Quarteira.

Bourcier also represented Canada at the 2001 Summer Universiade in China, the 2003 Summer Universiade in South Korea, and the 2005 Summer Universiade in Turkey.

== Career statistics ==
=== International ===
Appearances and goals by national team and year
National team	Year	Apps	Goals
Canada	2002	1	0
Total		1	0

== Honours ==
=== Club ===
Dynamo de Quebec

- Jubilee Trophy: 2007

=== Individual ===
- CIS All-Canadian First Team: 2000, 2001
- CIS All-Canadian Second Team: 2002
- CIS Tournament All-Star Team: 2002
- FSSQ First Team All-Star: 1999, 2000, 2001, 2002
