= Football at the 2003 Pan American Games – Women's tournament =

Football – Women's tournament at the 2003 Pan American Games
- Venues: Estadio Olímpico Juan Pablo Duarte, Estadio Parque del Este and Estadio Panamericano, San Cristóbal

Medalists
Gold medal	Brazil
Silver medal	Canada
Bronze medal	Mexico

The women's football tournament at the 2003 Pan American Games was the 2nd. edition of the women's football competition at Pan American Games. It was held in Santo Domingo, Dominican Republic from August 2 to August 15, 2003. Six U-23 teams competed. The defending champion, the United States, did not defend its title. The South American teams played with their U-20 teams. For the second time the women's tournament was included in the Pan Am Games.

== Preliminary round ==
=== Group A ===
Pos	Team	Pld	W	D	L	GF	GA	GD	Pts
1	Brazil	2	2	0	0	10	0	+10	6
2	Canada	2	1	0	1	4	6	−2	3
3	Haiti	2	0	0	2	1	9	−8	0

August 2

Haiti	0–5	Brazil
		Marta 6'; Kelly 18'; Formiga 55'; Renata Costa 70'; Maycon 78'

Estadio Panamericano, San Cristóbal

August 5

Canada	4–1	Haiti
Thorlakson 5', 55'; Kiss 16' (pen.); Collison 20'		Nord 62'

Estadio Panamericano, San Cristóbal

August 8

Brazil	5–0	Canada
Renata Costa 12'; Formiga 17'; Marta 28'; Maycon 68'; Elaine 72'

Estadio Panamericano, San Cristóbal

=== Group B ===
Pos	Team	Pld	W	D	L	GF	GA	GD	Pts
1	Mexico	2	2	0	0	4	1	+3	6
2	Argentina	2	1	0	1	5	5	0	3
3	Costa Rica	2	0	0	2	2	5	−3	0

August 3

Costa Rica	2–4	Argentina
Campos 69'; Chaves 83' (pen.)		Almeida 12', 63', 64'; Gaitan 90+'

Estadio Panamericano, San Cristóbal

August 6

Mexico	1–0	Costa Rica
Worbis 17'

Estadio Panamericano, San Cristóbal

August 8

Argentina	1–3	Mexico
Vallejos 71'		Worbis 24'; Rosales 79'; Mora 82'

Estadio Parque del Este

== Final round ==
Semi-finals
August 11 – Centro Olímpico
Brazil	2
Argentina	1
August 11 – Centro Olímpico
Mexico	2
Canada	3

Final
August 15 – Centro Olímpico
Brazil	2
Canada	1
Third place
August 14 – Centro Olímpico
Argentina	1
Mexico	4

=== Semi finals ===
August 11

Brazil	2–1	Argentina
Marta 26', 62'		Almeida 80'

Estadio Olímpico Juan Pablo Duarte, Santo Domingo

August 11

Mexico	2–3	Canada
Leyva 62'; Mora 89'		Consolante 25'; Collison 29'; Kiss 36'

Estadio Olímpico Juan Pablo Duarte, Santo Domingo

=== Bronze medal match ===
August 14

Mexico	4–1	Argentina
Leyva 4'; Mora 44'; Rosales 86'; Moreno 90'		Gerez 10'

Estadio Olímpico Juan Pablo Duarte, Santo Domingo

=== Gold medal match ===
August 15

Brazil	2–1	Canada
Formiga 43'; Cristiane 91'	Report	Kiss 66'

Estadio Olímpico Juan Pablo Duarte, Santo Domingo
Attendance: 73
Referee: Kari Seitz (United States)

Brazil
Canada

GK	Andréia Suntaque
DF	Tatiana
DF	Juliana Cabral	Substituted off
DF	Rosana
DF	Tânia Maranhão
MF	Elaine	Substituted off
MF	Renata Costa
MF	Maycon
FW	Rafaela	Substituted off
FW	Formiga
FW	Marta
Substitutes:
DF	Michele	Substituted on
FW	Kelly	Substituted on
FW	Cristiane	Substituted on
Manager:
(Brazil) Paulo Gonçalves

GK	Taryn Swiatek
DF	Justine Labrecque	Substituted off
DF	Kelly Haxton
DF	Linda Consolante
DF	Robyn Gayle
MF	Véronique Maranda	Substituted off
MF	Katie Johnston
MF	Kristina Kiss
FW	Rhian Wilkinson
FW	Tanya Dennis
FW	Katie Thorlakson
Substitutes:
DF	Holly Lincoln	Substituted on
MF	Selenia Iacchelli	Substituted on
Manager:
(Canada) Ian Bridge

First match on August 14 was abandoned at 0–0 in 24th minute due to heavy rain; Replay was set a day later.

2003 Pan American Games winners

Brazil
First title
