= Marie-Claude Dion =

Canadian soccer player

Personal information
- Full name: Marie-Claude Dion
- Date of birth: April 25, 1974 (age 52)
- Place of birth: Quebec City, Quebec, Canada
- Height: 1.65 m (5 ft 5 in)
- Position: Defender

Youth career
- 1991–1993: Dynamo de Quebec

College career
Years	Team	Apps	(Gls)
1994–1998	Laval Rouge et Or		

Senior career*
Years	Team	Apps	(Gls)
–2000	Dynamo de Quebec		
2000	Ottawa Fury		
2001	Laval Dynamites		

International career
1996–2001	Canada	27	(0)
Medal record
Women's football
Representing Canada
CONCACAF W Championship
Gold medal – first place	1998 Canada
- * Club domestic league appearances and goals

Marie-Claude Dion (born April 25, 1974) is a former Canadian soccer player who played as a defender. She made 27 appearances for the Canadian national team and was part of the squad that won gold at the 1998 CONCACAF Women's Championship.

== Early life ==
Born in Quebec City in 1974, Dion started playing soccer in Beauport at the age of eight. She was first noticed by the Canada Soccer Association in 1989, during a tournament played in Edmonton. In 1991, she joined the newly founded Dynamo de Quebec, who played in the Ligue de soccer élite du Québec (LSEQ).

== College career ==
Dion started studying at Laval University in the fall of 1994; at the time, the school did not have a women's soccer programme. Later that year, a team was finally established, led by Head Coach Helder Duarte, who also coached the Dynamo de Quebec. In her first year playing for the Rouge et Or, Dion finished first in team scoring with 12 goals and was named to the U Sports All-Canadian Second Team. Additionally, she was named to the RSEQ First Team All-Star and voted the RSEQ Rookie of the Year. In her second season, she won the Chantal Navert Memorial Award, which is awarded annually to the U Sports women's soccer Player of the Year, and was named to the U Sports All-Canadian First Team for the first time. She also won the RSEQ Player of the Year award and was included in the RSEQ First Team All-Star for the second consecutive season. In her third year, she received RSEQ First Team All-Star and U Sports All-Canadian Second Team honours again. In her final season with the team, she was once again named the RSEQ Player of the Year and received RSEQ First Team All-Star honours for the fourth straight year. She was also named to the U Sports All-Canadian First Team for the second time. Thus, in April 1999, she was one of six athletes to be honoured at the annual Gala du Mérite Sportif Rouge et Or.

== Club career ==
After graduating from Laval University, Dion briefly relocated to British Columbia to pursue her soccer career. From 2000 to 2002, she played in the USL W-League. In 2000, she played for the Ottawa Fury. The following year, she signed for the Laval Dynamites.

== International career ==
Dion was the first-ever female player from Quebec to be invited to a Canadian national team camp. She was part of the team that represented Canada at the 1993 Summer Universiade in Buffalo, New York, coached by Sylvie Béliveau.

On May 12, 1996, at the age of 22, Dion made her debut for the national team in Worcester, Massachusetts, playing the full 90 minutes in a 6–0 loss to the United States at the 1996 Women's U.S. Cup. In 1997, she played again at the 1997 Women's U.S. Cup. One year later, she was part of the team that won the 1998 CONCACAF Women's Championship, which served as a qualifier for the 1999 FIFA Women's World Cup. In 2000, she participated at the 2000 CONCACAF Women's Gold Cup, where Canada finished in fourth place. She made her 27th and final national team appearance on March 15, 2001, in a 2–1 victory over Portugal at the 2001 Algarve Cup.

Dion officially retired from the national team in the summer of 2002, at the age of 28.

== Career statistics ==
=== International ===
Appearances and goals by national team and year
National team	Year	Apps	Goals
Canada	1996	5	0
Canada	1997	3	0
Canada	1998	8	0
Canada	1999	2	0
Canada	2000	8	0
Canada	2001	1	0
Total		27	0

== Honours ==
=== International ===
Canada

- CONCACAF Women's Championship: 1998

=== Individual ===
- FSQ Female Senior Player of Excellence: 1996
- FSQ Female Youth Elite Player: 1995
- Chantal Navert Memorial Award: 1996
- RSEQ Player of the Year: 1996, 1998
- U Sports All-Canadian First Team: 1996, 1998
- U Sports All-Canadian Second Team: 1995, 1997
- RSEQ First Team All-Star: 1995, 1996, 1997, 1998
- RSEQ Rookie of the Year: 1995
