= Kellie-Ann Leyland =

Northern Irish footballer (born 1986)

Kellie Leyland
Personal information
- Full name: Kellie-Ann Leyland
- Date of birth: 5 November 1986 (age 39)
- Place of birth: St Helens, Merseyside, England
- Height: 5 ft 5 in (1.65 m)
- Position: Centre-back

College career
Years	Team	Apps	(Gls)
2005–2008	Hartford Hawks		

Senior career*
Years	Team	Apps	(Gls)
2008	Northland Raiders		
2009	Ottawa Fury Women		
2009–2011	Curzon Ashton Ladies		

International career
2005–	Northern Ireland		
- * Club domestic league appearances and goals as of 10 December 2007

Kellie-Ann Leyland (born 5 November 1986 in St Helens, Merseyside) is an English-born Northern Irish former footballer. She played for Curzon Ashton Ladies and Northern Ireland as a central defender.

== Club career ==
=== Early career ===
Leyland represented Newton-le-Willows High School and Merseyside Girls U16s. She played for Huyton, Sefton and Garswood Saints at club level and also attended the Centres of Excellence at Liverpool, Burnley, Everton and Tranmere Rovers.

She took A-Levels at the national women's football academy in Durham from 2003 to 2005, then departed to America on a scholarship.

=== Senior career ===
Leyland played for the Hartford Hawks for four seasons while attending the University of Hartford. She played for Northern Irish club Northland Raiders to maintain fitness during the winter.

Leyland signed for W-League club Ottawa Fury Women in 2009.

For 2009–10, Leyland joined Curzon Ashton Ladies in the FA Women's Premier League Northern Division. Her appearances were curtailed by a serious knee injury.

== International career ==
Leyland played for England U-17s as a 15-year-old. But in 2003 she switched allegiance to Northern Ireland and captained their U-19s.

She went on to be a full Northern Ireland international, making her debut in a 3–1 defeat to Sweden on 5 March 2005.

== Personal life ==
Leyland's mother, Jenny Leyland, was awarded an MBE for services to grassroots football in January 2011. Leyland senior is a youth football coach in Cheshire and also Runcorn Linnets' physiotherapist.
