= Amy Walsh (soccer) =

Canadian soccer player (born 1977)

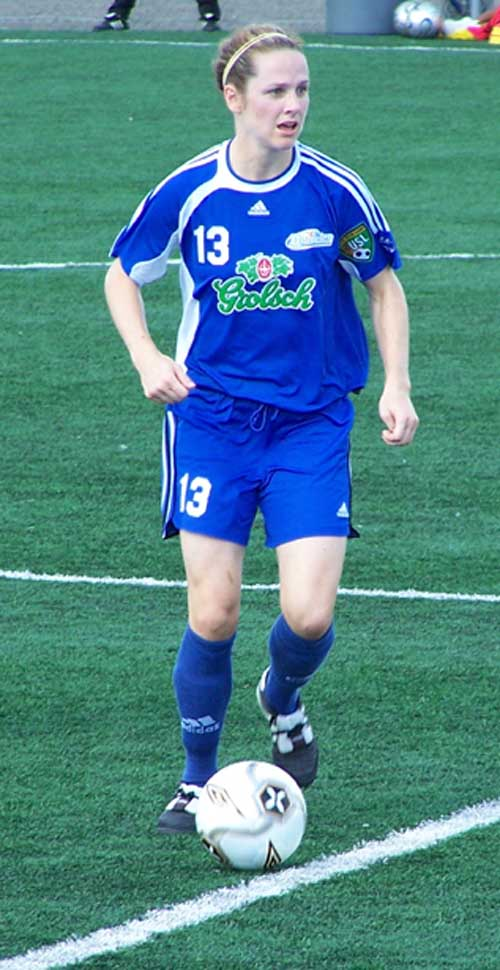
- Walsh in 2006

Personal information
- Full name: Amy Heather Walsh
- Date of birth: 13 September 1977 (age 49)
- Place of birth: Montreal, Quebec, Canada
- Height: 5 ft 6 in (1.68 m)
- Position: Midfielder

College career
Years	Team	Apps	(Gls)
1996	McGill Martlets		
1997–1999	Nebraska Cornhuskers	63	(14)

Senior career*
Years	Team	Apps	(Gls)
2001	San Jose CyberRays		
2001	Atlanta Beat	16	(0)
2003	Ottawa Fury Women		
2004	Montreal Xtreme		
2006–2009	Laval Comets		

International career
1998–2009	Canada	102	(5)
- * Club domestic league appearances and goals

Amy Heather Walsh (born 13 September 1977) is a former soccer midfielder for the Canada national team. From 1998 to 2009, she played 102 matches for the national team. In May 2017, Walsh was inducted into the Canadian Soccer Hall of Fame. Walsh works as a TV analyst. Her sister, Cindy Walsh, also played for the Canadian women's team.

== Collegiate career ==
Walsh began her collegiate career at McGill University in 1996, earning All-Canadian honours. Walsh attended the University of Nebraska during the 1997–99 seasons, where she was twice named on the first team (All-Conference) and once on the first-team (All-Central Region).

== Club career ==
Walsh played professionally for the Atlanta Beat of Women's United Soccer Association, reaching the 2001 WUSA final. Walsh played for Ottawa Fury FC and FC Select Rive-Sud. She also played for the Montreal Xtreme and Laval Comets of the American W-League. Walsh played her last season in 2009. She gave birth to a child in January 2010, having played with Laval for four months during the pregnancy.

== International career ==
Walsh made her senior-team debut for Canada age 20 on 19 July 1998, starting in a 2–1 friendly loss to China.

Walsh featured in the Canadian side which won gold at the 1998 CONCACAF Women's Championship.

Walsh started in Canada's three matches at the 1999 FIFA Women's World Cup.

From 2000 to 2004, Walsh was a four-time Québec player of the year.

Walsh was part of the squad for the 2007 FIFA Women's World Cup in China, and came off the bench to play in a 2–1 loss to Norway in the group stage.

Walsh came off the bench in Canada's 2–1 loss to Sweden in the 2008 Olympics, earning an assist.

On 7 March 2009, Walsh became the fifth women's player to make 100 appearances for the Canadian senior team.

Told by Canada Soccer that she and her teammate Martina Franko would have to pay for a caretaker, flights, lodging, and food on site if they were to bring their children to national team camp, Walsh retired from playing professionally. Speaking afterwards, she said "I think I hoped otherwise and I was disappointed and I was angry, but I wasn't shocked — in the least bit. That's a basic human right, is your choice to be a mother. And you should be able to a mother and a footballer concurrently."

== Post-playing career ==
Following her playing career, Walsh worked as a yoga and mobility coach. In 2022, Walsh was announced as a women's soccer collaborator for CF Montréal, working as an ambassador promoting the development of women's soccer in the club. Walsh has worked as a broadcast analyst for TSN and CBC. She holds a UEFA certificate in football management and is co-host of the Canadian soccer podcast Footy Prime.

== Honours and awards ==
Individual

- Canadian Soccer Hall of Fame (2017)
- Quebec Soccer Hall of Fame (2013)
- College Soccer Online Third-Team All-American (1999)
- Soccer Buzz Honorable-Mention All-American (1998)
- NSCAA First-Team All-Central Region (1999)
- NSCAA Second-Team All-Central Region (1998)
- First-Team All-Big 12 Conference (1998, 1999)

== See also ==
- List of women's footballers with 100 or more international caps
