= Sari Raber =

Canadian soccer player

Personal information
- Full name: Sari Jael Raber
- Date of birth: January 1, 1986 (age 40)
- Place of birth: Edmonton, Alberta, Canada
- Height: 1.65 m (5 ft 5 in)
- Position: Midfielder

Youth career
- McMath Secondary School

College career
Years	Team	Apps	(Gls)
2004–2008	Nebraska Cornhuskers		

Senior career*
Years	Team	Apps	(Gls)
2007	Vancouver Whitecaps		
2008–2010	Ottawa Fury		

International career
2004	Canada U19	6	(0)
2004–2010	Canada	7	(0)
- * Club domestic league appearances and goals

Sari Jael Raber (born January 1, 1986) is a Canadian retired soccer player who played as a midfielder, winger, and sometimes number 10. She has been a member of the Canada women's national team. Due to her pace, she got a nickname "Speed" from her teammates.
