= Soccerplexe Catalogna =

The Soccerplexe Catalogna was a sports complex for soccer situated in the city of Montreal, Quebec, Canada. It was the first sports centre in Greater Montreal equipped with both an indoor and an outdoor soccer pitch with synthetic turf. The latter can also be divided into 3 smaller courts to pit 7 against 7 (instead of 11 against 11). Additionally, the Soccerplexe was the first in Quebec to upgrade to FieldTurf. The Centre Sportif Bois-de-Boulogne is the only other location in the area with this type of floor covering.

The Lac Saint-Louis Regional Soccer Association’s offices were at the Soccerplexe, and they hold a winter camp there for players at the intermediate and elite levels. Quebec's teams also used it to host their evaluation camps and exhibition matches. The Soccerplexe is also recognized as a national centre of high performance for athletes identified by Soccer Canada. Soccer matches, and various regional, provincial, and national tournaments are held there as well. The Soccerplexe is also available to football and soccer teams playing at various levels for evaluation or training camps. It was at one time the permanent training site for CF Montreal and occasionally for the Montreal Alouettes.

The Soccerplexe was closed in April 2021 due to insolvency. The centre has since been sold and re-opened under the name Soccerplexe Lachine, although the new owners planned to re-develop the site.

The centre was built by Catalogna Group.

== See also ==
- Lakers du Lac Saint-Louis - Elite soccer club in ARS Lac St. Louis
