= 2004 Four Nations Tournament (women's football) =

Tournament details
- Host country: China
- City: Shenzhen
- Dates: 30 January – 3 February 2004
- Teams: 4 (from 3 confederations)

The 2004 Four Nations Tournament was the fourth edition of this invitational women's football tournament held in China with four national teams participating in a round robin format. It was held from January 30 to February 3, 2004, in the city of Shenzhen.

== Final standings ==
Team	Pld	W	D	L	GF	GA	GD	Pts
United States	3	2	1	0	5	0	+5	7
China	3	1	2	0	4	3	+1	5
Sweden	3	1	1	1	5	6	−1	4
Canada	3	0	0	3	2	7	−5	0

== Match results ==
30 January 2004

Sweden	0–3	United States
		Boxx 13'; Tarpley 51', 66'

Shenzhen Stadium, Shenzhen
Attendance: 3,500
Referee: Zhang Dongqing (China)
30 January 2004

China	2–1	Canada
Teng Wei 12', 52'		Maranda 87'

Shenzhen Stadium, Shenzhen

1 February 2004

Sweden	3–1	Canada
Moström 29'; Svensson 35'; Sjögran 71'		Sinclair 75'

Shenzhen Stadium, Shenzhen
1 February 2004

China	0–0	United States

Shenzhen Stadium, Shenzhen
Attendance: 5,000
Referee: Jenny Palmqvist (Sweden)

3 February 2004

Canada	0–2	United States
		Tarpley 13'; Fawcett 81' (pen.)

Shenzhen Stadium, Shenzhen
Attendance: 1,000
Referee: Zhang Dongqing (China)
3 February 2004

China	2–2	Sweden
Li Jie 37' (pen.) unknown scorer 90'		Sjögran 30'; Öqvist 82'

Shenzhen Stadium, Shenzhen
