= Linda Hathorn =

Canadian soccer player

Personal information
- Birth name: Linda Consolante
- Date of birth: May 23, 1982 (age 44)
- Place of birth: Montreal, Quebec, Canada
- Height: 1.76 m (5 ft 9 1/2 in)
- Position: Defender

College career
Years	Team	Apps	(Gls)
2001–2005	Maine Black Bears		

Senior career*
Years	Team	Apps	(Gls)
2003–2006	Ottawa Fury	60	(1)

International career
2003	Canada	3	(0)

Managerial career
- 2006–2009: Northern Arizona Lumberjacks (assistant)
- 2009: Regis Rangers (assistant)
- 2010: Valparaiso Crusaders (assistant)
- 2011–2012: Maine Black Bears (assistant)
- 2013–2016: Iona Gaels
- 2018–present: The Loomis Chaffee School
Medal record
Women's soccer
Representing Canada
Pan American Games
Silver medal – second place	2003 Santo Domingo	Team
- * Club domestic league appearances and goals

Linda Hathorn (née Consolante, born May 23, 1982) is a Canadian retired professional soccer defender, who won the silver medal with the Canadian national team at the 2003 Pan American Games and finished fourth at the 2003 FIFA Women’s World Cup in the United States.

On July 20, 2003, 21-year-old Hathorn made her first international appearance with the Canada national team in a 2–1 win over Brazil in Ottawa.

She is married to Donnie Hathorn.
