= Rachelle Beanlands =

Canadian soccer player

Personal information
- Full name: Rachelle Anne Beanlands
- Date of birth: May 11, 1993 (age 33)
- Place of birth: Ottawa, Ontario, Canada
- Height: 1.75 m (5 ft 9 in)
- Position: Goalkeeper

Youth career
- Gloucester Hornets
- Cumberland United
- Nepean SC
- Ottawa South United
- Ottawa Fury

College career
Years	Team	Apps	(Gls)
2012–2015	Maryland Terrapins	78	(0)

Senior career*
Years	Team	Apps	(Gls)
2011	Ottawa Fury FC		
2012–2015	Laval Comets		

International career
2011	Canada	1	(0)
- * Club domestic league appearances and goals

Rachelle Anne Beanlands (born May 11, 1993) is a former Canadian soccer player. She played as a goalkeeper.

== Early life ==
She began playing youth soccer with the Glouchester Hornets. She later played for Cumberland United, Ottawa Fury Academy, and Ottawa South United.

In 2010, she was named 2010 Ottawa Soccer Athlete of the Year after playing with the Ottawa Fury U17s, posting a 12-0-2 record allowing only five goals, helping the team win the 2010 Super Y-League North American Championships. She was named to the Canada U17 team.

From 2011 to 2015, she attended the University of Maryland, playing for the Maryland Terrapins, redshirting her first year. By the end of her tenure, she had the most starts for a goalkeeper in the school's history with 78. Beanlands was a five-time academic all-conference honoree, and in 2014 was named to the Capital One Academic All-District Team, and was awarded the Big Ten Medal of Honor in 2016.

== Club career ==
She played club soccer for the Ottawa Fury and Laval Comets.

== International career ==
Beanlands received multiple callups to Canadian youth team camps. She was part of the Canada U17 team that won the 2010 CONCACAF Women's U-17 Championship, as well as serving asbackup goalkeeper at the 2010 FIFA U-17 Women's World Cup.

She made her sole appearance for Canada against Argentina recording a clean sheet in a 1-0 victory, at the 2011 Pan American Games; Canada ultimately won gold.

== Post-playing career ==
After her playing career, she attended medical school at the University of Western Ontario, and became a medical doctor.
