= Danielle Vella =

Canadian soccer player

Personal information
- Full name: Danielle Vella
- Date of birth: January 24, 1974 (age 52)
- Place of birth: Ottawa, Ontario, Canada
- Positions: Midfielder; forward

College career
| Years | Team | Apps | (Gls) |
| 1994–1997 | Ottawa Gee-Gees | | |

Senior career*
| Years | Team | Apps | (Gls) |
- Ottawa Fury

International career
| 2000 | Canada | 1 | (0) |
- * Club domestic league appearances and goals

Danielle Vella (born January 21, 1974) is a former Canadian soccer player.

== Playing career ==
Vella attended the University of Ottawa, playing for the women's soccer team, where she won the 1996 and 1997 OUA Championships, as well as the national 1996 CIS championship, in which she won the Gunn Baldursson Award as MVP. She was named an OUA first team all-star in 1994, 1995, and 1996, as well as a second-team All-Canadian in 1995 and 1996.

She played in the USL W-League with the Ottawa Fury.

In 1997 and 1998, she won the Ontario Cup with Nepean United Spirit. In 1999, she won the Ontario Cup with the South Nepean United Spirits (who eventually merged with another club to form Ottawa South United in 2003). In 2006, she won the Ontario Cup with the Ottawa Royals.

In 2000, she was called up to the Canada national team for the 2000 Algarve Cup, where she made her debut and sole appearance on March 12 against China.

== Later life ==
Vella became an youth coach with Ottawa South United and also an assistant coach with the Carleton Ravens women's team.
