= Marie Claude Naddaf =

Syrian activist

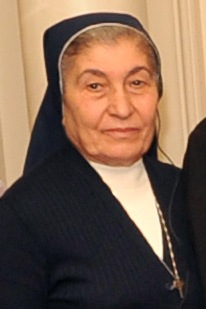
Marie Claude Naddaf

Marie Claude Naddaf (Arabic: ماري كلود نداف) is an activist and a nun. In 1994, she became Mother Superior at the Good Shepherd Convent in Damascus, and in 1996, she and her convent opened the "Oasis Shelter", Syria's first facility for victims of human trafficking and domestic violence. She also began Syria's first telephone hotline, which was attached to an emergency shelter for women.

She won for women in police custody in Syria the right to be released to a shelter, if they were determined to be victims of trafficking. She also created a nursery school and a vocational education program at the women's prison in Damascus.

She received a 2010 International Women of Courage award.
