= Tania Singfield =

Canadian soccer player (born 1970)

Personal information
- Date of birth: 2 September 1970 (age 56)
- Place of birth: Low, Quebec, Canada
- Height: 1.70 m (5 ft 7 in)
- Position: Goalkeeper

College career
Years	Team	Apps	(Gls)
- Ottawa Gee-Gees

Senior career*
Years	Team	Apps	(Gls)
1995	Chicago Dactyls		
2000–2001	Ottawa Fury		

International career
1990–1997	Canada	5	(0)

Managerial career
- 2014–: Canada U17 (women) (Goalkeeping coach)
- * Club domestic league appearances and goals

Tania Singfield (born 2 September 1970) is a Canadian soccer player who played as a goalkeeper for the Canada women's national soccer team from 1990 to 1997. She was part of the team at the 1995 FIFA Women's World Cup.

== Playing career ==
- Canadian National Team 1990-1997
- World Cup Team / Sweden 1995
- Canada Games Team / Quebec 1993
- World University Team 1993
- Chicago Raptors / W-League 1995
- Ottawa Fury / W-League 2000-2001
- Ottawa University Gee Gees / Champions 1996 / Silver 1997
- Nepean United Spirits / Canadian Champs 1998

== Coaching career ==
After she finished playing professionally, Singfield coached other goalkeepers. She is the Director and Founder of Golden Gloves Academy in Ottawa, ON (Stittsville). She has helped develop players at all levels and has worked with many clubs, including Laguna Hills Eclipse in California, the Canadian National Team, and the National Excel Program (NEX)..

Since 2014, she has been the goalkeeper coach for Canada's U17 national team. She served as goalkeeper coach at the 2016 FIFA U-17 Women's World Cup in Jordan, the 2016 U-17 Four Nations Tour in China, the 2016 U-15 CONCACAF Championship in Orlando, Florida and the 2015 U-15 CONCACAF Championship in Cayman Islands.
