= 2009–10 2. Frauen-Bundesliga =

German women's football league season

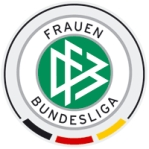
Women’s Fussball Bundesliga logo

The 2009–10 season of the 2nd Fußball-Bundesliga (women) is the sixth season of Germany's second-tier women's football league. It began on 20 September 2009 and the date set for the final relegation game is 30 May 2009. Herforder SV Borussia Friedenstal and Bayer Leverkusen achieved promotion to the Bundesliga.

== Standings group north ==
Pos	Team	Pld	W	D	L	GF	GA	GD	Pts	Promotion or relegation
1	HSV Borussia Friedenstal (A)	22	18	4	0	69	21	+48	58	Promoted to the Fußball-Bundesliga (women)
2	Turbine Potsdam II	22	15	4	3	61	23	+38	49	
3	SV Victoria Gersten	22	12	3	7	51	30	+21	39	
4	Lokomotive Leipzig	22	11	5	6	44	35	+9	38	
5	Hamburg II	22	9	4	9	53	51	+2	31	
6	Magdeburger FFC (N)	22	9	4	9	36	34	+2	31	
7	Werder Bremen (N)	22	8	5	9	29	37	−8	29	
8	FFC Oldesloe 2000	22	9	1	12	24	41	−17	28	
9	FSV Gütersloh 2009 (Note: The women's football department of FC Gütersloh 2000 decided to leave the club to form an independent women's football club, FSV Gütersloh 2009. The new club inherited the rights to compete in the 2. Bundesliga and the DFB-Pokal from FC Gütersloh 2000.)	22	7	4	11	31	43	−12	25	
10	Holstein Kiel	22	6	5	11	29	45	−16	23	Relegation play against the 10th of the group south
11	Wattenscheid 09 (S)	22	4	1	17	20	59	−39	13	Relegated to the new Fußball-Regionalliga (women)
12	Blau-Weiß Hohen Neuendorf	22	2	4	16	20	48	−28	10	Relegated to the new Fußball-Regionalliga (women)

Notes:

(N)	Promoted from the Regionalliga last season
(A)	Relegated from the Bundesliga last season
(S)	Played in the 2. Bundesliga south last season

== Standings group south ==
Pos	Team	Pld	W	D	L	GF	GA	GD	Pts	Promotion or relegation
1	Bayer 04 Leverkusen	22	17	3	2	62	19	+43	54	Promoted to the Fußball-Bundesliga (women)
2	VfL Sindelfingen	22	16	4	2	49	12	+37	52	
3	1. FC Köln (N) (Note: FFC Brauweiler Pulheim joined the 1. FC Köln after their championship in the Regionalliga in 2008–09.)	22	14	3	5	54	24	+30	45	
4	TSV Crailsheim (A)	22	12	4	6	46	25	+21	40	
5	FCR 2001 Duisburg II	22	12	3	7	48	33	+15	39	
6	SC Sand	22	8	3	11	38	36	+2	27	
7	FV Löchgau	22	6	5	11	20	37	−17	23	
8	FFC Frankfurt II	22	6	6	10	27	47	−20	24	
9	Bayern Munich II (N)	22	6	4	12	36	61	−25	22	
10	Wacker München	22	5	4	13	27	42	−15	19	Relegation play against the 10th of the north group
11	ASV Hagsfeld	22	3	5	14	24	58	−34	14	Relegated to the new Fußball-Regionalliga (women)
12	TuS Wörrstadt (N)	22	2	6	14	21	58	−37	12	Relegated to the new Fußball-Regionalliga (women)

Notes:

(N)	Promoted from the Regionalliga last season
(A)	Relegated from the Bundesliga last season

== Relegation play-offs ==
The two 10th-placed teams of each division played a play-off. Holstein Kiel won on aggregate and stayed in the 2nd league.

Date	Match			Result
24 May 2010	Wacker München	–	Holstein Kiel	0–0
30 May 2010	Holstein Kiel	–	FFC Wacker München	1–0
