= Herforder SV Borussia Friedenstal =

HSV Borussia Friedenstal
- Full name: Herforder Sportverein Borussia Friedenstal e.V.
- Founded: 1953; 73 years ago
- Ground: Friedrich-Ludwig-Jahn-Stadion, Herford
- Capacity: 18,400
- Chairman: Birgit Schmidt
- Head Coach: Jürgen Prüfer
- League: 2. Bundesliga
- 2015–16: 4th
Home colours	Away colours

HSV Borussia Friedenstal, or Herforder SV, is a German sports club based in Friedenstal, a suburb of Herford, North Rhine-Westphalia. The club was founded in 1953 and the women's team was established in 1969. Friedenstal greatest success was the qualification for the Bundesliga in 2008–09. After being relegated in its first Bundesliga season, the club again got promoted to the Bundesliga in 2009–10 but now plays in the 2. Bundesliga again.

== History ==
Borussia Friedenstal was founded in 1953. After a friendly game in 1969 the women's department was established under the lead of Fritz Böke and Doris Henschel. Four years later Friedenstal began participating in official games. 1975 Friedenstal achieved promotion to the Bezirksliga and three years later another promotion brought the club to Germany's top-tier football league, the Landesliga. In 1980 Borussia lost in the final of the Westfalencup only on penalties to TSV Siegen, a club to become one of Germany's most successful women's teams. Friedenstal also qualified for the Verbandsliga at its inception in 1981 and for the Regionalliga at its inception in 1985.

After withdrawing their team from the Regionalliga Friedenstal got promoted to the Regionalliga again in 1993. An intermezzo in the Verbandsliga in 1995–96 ended without a loss and yet another promotion to the Regionalliga for Friedenstal. The club won the Westfalenpokal in 2000 and 2001, thereby qualifying for the DFB Pokal and on both occasions reaching the round of 16 in the cup.

At the inception of the 2. Bundesliga in 2004 Friedenstal failed to qualify, but managed promotion as champion of the Regionalliga West in 2006. After just two years in the 2. Bundesliga the club's greatest success came in form of the promotion to Germany's premier football league, the Bundesliga where Friedenstal faced immediate relegation, though. In 2009–10 Friedenstal won 2. Bundesliga again, this time without a loss and setting a new record and plays in the 1. Bundesliga again in 2010–11.

== Current squad ==
As of 8 July 2018

Note: Flags indicate national team as defined under FIFA eligibility rules; some limited exceptions apply. Players may hold more than one non-FIFA nationality.

No.	Pos.	Nation	Player
1	GK	GER	Carina Schlüter
2	DF	GER	Leonie Heitlindemann
4	DF	GER	Friederike Schaaf
5	DF	BEL	Jessy Atila
6	MF	GER	Lea Althoff
7	MF	GER	Isabelle Knipp
8	MF	GER	Anja Barwinsky
9	MF	GER	Lisa Lösch
10	MF	GER	Merza Julević

No.	Pos.	Nation	Player
11	DF	GER	Lena Göllner
12	GK	GER	Josephine Plehn
13	FW	GER	Giustina Ronzetti
14	FW	CAN	Christabel Oduro
15	FW	GER	Pia Salzmann
17	MF	GER	Louisa Lagaris
18	DF	GER	Lena Hackmann
24	MF	GER	Lena Schulte

=== Former players ===
- (Canada) Kylla Sjoman
- (Austria) Laura Feiersinger
- (Serbia) Kristina Lazic
- (Chile) Cote Rojas
- (United States) Carlie Davis

== Statistics ==
Season	League	Place	W	D	L	GF	GA	Pts	DFB-Cup
1993–94	Regionalliga West (II)	8	8	3	11	34	38	19	not qualified
1994–95	Regionalliga West	unknown							not qualified
1995–96	Regionalliga West	unknown							not qualified
1996–97	Regionalliga West	4	12	3	9	39	28	39	not qualified
1997–98	Regionalliga West	3	13	5	4	42	20	44	not qualified
1998–99	Regionalliga West	5	9	2	11	38	44	29	not qualified
1999–00	Regionalliga West	5	11	1	10	37	39	34	not qualified
2000–01	Regionalliga West	7	6	4	10	33	63	22	2nd round
2001–02	Regionalliga West	4	14	4	6	66	43	46	2nd round
2002–03	Regionalliga West	6	11	3	10	56	44	36	not qualified
2003–04	Regionalliga West	9	8	3	13	41	48	27	not qualified
2004–05	Regionalliga West	4	12	4	6	64	38	40	not qualified
2005–06	Regionalliga West (III)	1	16	3	3	80	32	51	not qualified
2006–07	2. Bundesliga Nord (II)	8	8	6	8	42	42	30	2nd round
2007–08	2. Bundesliga Nord	1	13	5	4	53	33	44	3rd round
2008–09	Bundesliga (I)	11	4	2	16	22	77	14	2nd round
2009–10	2. Bundesliga Nord	1	18	4	0	69	21	58	2nd round
2010–11	Bundesliga	12	1	2	19	25	80	5	2nd round
2011–12	2. Bundesliga Nord	4	13	4	5	62	27	43	3rd round
2012–13	2. Bundesliga Nord	2	15	2	5	62	26	47	Quarterfinals
2013–14	2. Bundesliga Nord	2	14	5	3	54	18	47	2nd round
2014–15	Bundesliga	12	1	2	19	18	89	5	Round of 16
Green marks a season followed by promotion, red a season followed by relegation.
