= Véronique Maranda =

Canadian soccer player

Personal information
- Full name: Véronique Vallieres Maranda
- Date of birth: August 18, 1986 (age 40)
- Place of birth: Saint-Lambert, Quebec, Canada
- Height: 1.68 m (5 ft 6 in)
- Position: Midfielder

Youth career
- FC Sélect Rive-Sud

College career
| Years | Team | Apps | (Gls) |
| 2005–2006 | Tennessee Lady Volunteers | 25 | (4) |
| 2007–2009 | Montreal Carabins | | |
| 2011 | Montreal Carabins | | |

Senior career*
| Years | Team | Apps | (Gls) |
| 2004 | Montreal Xtreme | | |
| 2005 | Ottawa Fury | | |
| 2015 | Laval Comets | | |

International career
| 2004 | Canada U19 | 9 | (3) |
| 2006 | Canada U20 | 5 | (1) |
| 2003 | Canada U23 | 4 | (0) |
| 2003–2004 | Canada | 12 | (1) |
- * Club domestic league appearances and goals

Véronique Vallieres Maranda (born August 18, 1986) is a former Canadian soccer player who played as a midfielder.

== Early life ==
She played youth soccer with FC Sélect Rive-Sud. In 2003, she was named Soccer Player of the Year in Quebec.

== College career ==
In 2005, she began attending the University of Tennessee, playing for the women's soccer team. In her freshman year, she played in all 23 matches, scoring four goals, including her first career college goal on September 18 against Washington. In 2006, she only played in two games.

In September 2006, she departed Tennessee to attend the Université de Montréal, but due to Canadian Interuniversity Sport regulations was required to sit out one year due to transferring schools before she could represent the soccer team. From 2007 through 2009, she served as team captain, was named a first team all-star, also being named league MVP in both 2008 and 2009, and was the league leading scorer in 2009.

After a year off, she returned to the Carabins in 2011, helping them win the league title and being named MVP in the finals.

== Club career ==
In 2004, she played for the Montreal Xtreme, scoring her first goal in the team's first ever match against the Toronto Inferno.

In 2005, she played for the Ottawa Fury.

In 2015, she played with the Laval Comets, helping them finish 3rd in the 2015 USL W-League season, scoring in the 3rd place match against Quebec Dynamo ARSQ. Also in 2015, she was part of the Quebec provincial team that faced the France national team that was preparing for the 2015 FIFA Women's World Cup in Canada.

== International career ==
After being called to some national youth camps in 2002 and 2003, Maranda earned her first cap for the Canada senior team on May 19, 2003, against England, at age 17, prior to earning any youth caps. She scored her only senior goal on January 30, 2004, against China at the 2004 Four Nations Tournament.

In 2003, she was named to the Canada U23 for the Pan Am Games. She later represented Canada at the 2004 CONCACAF Women's U-19 Championship, scoring her first international goal against Costa Rica U19 on June 4, 2004. She later appeared at the 2004 FIFA U-19 Women's World Championship, and the 2006 CONCACAF Women's U-20 Championship.
