= Kristina Kiss =

Canadian soccer player

Personal information
- Date of birth: February 13, 1981 (age 45)
- Place of birth: Ottawa, Ontario, Canada

Senior career*
| Years | Team | Apps | (Gls) |
| 2000–2002 | Ottawa Fury | | |
| 2003 | IF Fløya | | |
| 2007 | Amazon Grimstad | | |
| 2017 | West Ottawa SC | 2 | (1) |

International career^{‡}
| 2000–2008 | Canada | 75 | (8) |
Medal record
Women's soccer
Representing Canada
Pan American Games
| Silver medal – second place | 2003 Santo Domingo | Team |
| Bronze medal – third place | 2007 Rio de Janeiro | Team |
- * Club domestic league appearances and goals ‡ National team caps and goals as of 11 November 2019

Kristina Kiss (born February 13, 1981) is a Canadian former soccer midfielder, who won medals twice with the Canada national team at the Pan American Games: 2003 and 2007. She serves as technical director for Northern Super League club Ottawa Rapid FC.

== Career ==
On March 12, 2000 at the Algarve Cup, 19 year old Kristina made her debut for Canada's Senior Women's Team vs powerhouse China. This is where she began her National Team journey under newly appointed coach Even Pellerud. Always playing the ball with precision Kristina scored in her fifth game with Canada on May 31, 2000 in a 2:1 win over New Zealand helping the team finish fourth at the 2000 CONCACAF Gold Cup. Later the team and Kristina would have continued success by finishing; 2nd at both the 2002 CONCACAF Gold Cup, 2nd at the XIV Pan American Games (2003) in Santo Domingo where Kristina scored Canada's tying goal in a 2–1 loss to Brazil in the final. She also finished; 4th with Canada at the FIFA Women's World Cup USA in 2003, 2nd with Canada at the 2006 CONCACAF Gold Cup – lost 2–1 to the United States in the final, 3rd at the XV Pan American Games (2007) in Rio, represented Canada at the FIFA Women's World Cup China 2007, 2nd at the 2008 CONCACAF Women's Olympic Qualification Tournament, quarter-finalist at the 2008 Women's Olympic Football Tournament. She was also a National Club Champion with the Nepean United Spirit in 1998.

Kristina was named the top Ottawa soccer player for the 2008 season. Recognized at the annual Ottawa Sports Awards, claiming the Athlete of the Year. She was later invited to join the U20 Women's National Team as a guest coach in July 2009. She was inducted into the Ottawa Sports Hall of Fame in 2015. She now dedicates her time to becoming a professional coach successfully completed her CSA National A Licence, Youth Licence and Children's Licence. She understands her position as a role model to the female players in the Ottawa community and is committed to developing elite players who may one day follow in her footsteps on the Canadian National Team. Kiss was the captain of Team Canada's 2003 Pan American Games team and scored three goals in the tournament. She returned to the national team in 2006 after a two-year absence.

In 2017, she played with West Ottawa SC in League1 Ontario.

== Personal ==
She won the Canadian National Junior Judo Championship in 1995 in the under 44 kg category. Kiss studied philosophy and psychology at the Carleton University.

== Post-playing career ==
After retiring, she became the technical director of West Ottawa Soccer Club in 2012. In 2021, she served as a guest coach with the Canada national women's team ahead of their gold medal performance at the Olympics. In June 2021, she was appointed as Canada Soccer's manager of development-programming, focusing on representation of women, marginalized, and under-represented groups across Canada. Speaking about the Canada Soccer job after she had moved on in 2022, Kiss said "It ended up not being a great fit for me and I really missed being on the field." In 2022, she joined Ottawa City SC as technical female manager. Kiss serves as the technical director for Northern Super League club Ottawa Rapid FC, having joined them before their inaugural season.
