= Leisha Alcia =

Canadian soccer player

Personal information
- Date of birth: March 25, 1982 (age 44)
- Height: 1.73 m (5 ft 8 in)
- Position: Goalkeeper

College career
Years	Team	Apps	(Gls)
2001–2004	Illinois Fighting Illini	83	(0)

Senior career*
Years	Team	Apps	(Gls)
- Toronto Inferno
2003	Hampton Roads Piranhas		
2004–?	Ottawa Fury		

Managerial career
- 2005: Illinois Fighting Illini (assistant)
- 2006: Western Kentucky Lady Toppers (assistant)
- 2007–2013: Illinois Fighting Illini (assistant)
- 2019–2022: WPI Engineers (assistant)
- * Club domestic league appearances and goals

Leisha Alcia (born March 25, 1982) is a former Canadian soccer player who played as a goalkeeper.

== College career ==
Alcia attended the University of Illinois Urbana-Champaign, where she played 83 games for the women's soccer team from 2001 to 2004 and served as team captain. She held the school records for career saves with 368, as well as single season goals against average (0.54) and save percentage, single season shutouts (12), career shutouts (24) and consecutive shutouts (6), and single season saves. She was part of their 2003 Big Ten Tournament championship team. Over her four years, she earned All-American honours in 2001 and 2004 and also was named to the All-Big Ten and Big Ten All-Tournament Team and she also won the Dike Eddleman Athlete of the Year award in 2003–2004.

== Club career ==
Alcia played for the Toronto Inferno in the USL W-League. In 2003, she played for the Hampton Roads Piranhas. In 2004, she played for the Ottawa Fury where she was named Goalkeeper of the Year, recording 11 shutouts.

== International career ==
Alcia received her first callup to a U18 national team camp in 1999, followed by a U19 camp the following year.

She earned her first call up to the senior team in 2002. She made her only appearance on November 1, 2006 at the 2006 Peace Queen Cup against the São Paulo state team, which played under the name of Brazil.

== Coaching career ==
Following her career at Illinois, she served as a student assistant coach with the team in 2005. Afterwards, in 2006, she joined Western Kentucky University as an assistant before returning to Illinois as an assistant once again in 2007. She later worked with the WPI Engineers women's team as an assistant.
