= Isabelle Morneau =

Canadian soccer player

Personal information
- Date of birth: April 18, 1976 (age 50)
- Place of birth: Greenfield Park, Quebec, Canada
- Height: 1.63 m (5 ft 4 in)
- Position: Defender

College career
Years	Team	Apps	(Gls)
1996–1999	Nebraska Cornhuskers	91	(24)

Senior career*
Years	Team	Apps	(Gls)
2003	Ottawa Fury Women	0	(0)
2004	Montreal Xtreme	10	(0)
2006–2007	Laval Comets	2	(0)

International career
1995–2006	Canada	87	(6)
- * Club domestic league appearances and goals

Isabelle Morneau (born April 18, 1976 in Greenfield Park, Quebec) is a Canadian retired soccer player who played for the Canada women's national soccer team. She was selected as a member of the Canadian Soccer Hall of Fame in 2014.

Morneau made 87 appearances for the Canada women's national soccer team between 1995 and 2006. She represented Canada at three FIFA Women's World Cups, in 1995, 1999, and 2003.

Away from international soccer, Morneau played NCAA soccer at the University of Nebraska–Lincoln (1996–1999) and is one of the most decorated players to have graduated from the program. She was an All-American, All-Conference, All-Academic player who led Nebraska to its best NCAA Tournament finish during her senior year. She graduated from Nebraska with a degree in Psychology carrying a 3.6 GPA and received a scholarship from the Big 12 Conference for post-graduate studies.

Morneau has played professionally for the Ottawa Fury Women (2003), Montreal Xtreme (2004), and currently plays for the Laval Comètes (2006–2007) of the W-League.

Now Morneau currently resides in Longueuil, Quebec and she works as a physiotherapist.
