= Noel Trépanier =

Canadian soccer player

Personal information
- Full name: Noel Melissa Trépanier
- Date of birth: November 30, 1974 (age 51)
- Place of birth: Leamington, Ontario, Canada
- Height: 1.58 m (5 ft 2 in)
- Position: Defender

College career
Years	Team	Apps	(Gls)
1994–1997	Ottawa Gee-Gees		
2000	Ottawa Gee-Gees		

Senior career*
Years	Team	Apps	(Gls)
2001–2002	Ottawa Fury		

International career
2001–2002	Canada	8	(0)
- * Club domestic league appearances and goals

Noel Melissa Trépanier (born November 30, 1974) is a former Canadian soccer player.

== Playing career ==
Trépanier attended the University of Ottawa, making the women's soccer team as a walk-on in 1994. She helped lead the team to the 1996 national championship and was a two-time All-Canadian. After departing the school after her fourth year in 1997, she returned in 2000 for her final season of eligibility. That season in 2000, she won the Chantal Navert Memorial Award as Canadian University sport MVP and a first-team All-Canadian. In 2000, they won the OUA provincial title and came in 2nd at the national tournament.

In 1997 and 1998, she won the Ontario Cup with Nepean United Spirit. In 1999, she won the Ontario Cup with the South Nepean United Spirits (who eventually merged with another club to form Ottawa South United in 2003). In 2006, she won the Ontario Cup with the Ottawa Royals.

In 2001 and 2002, Trépanier played for the Ottawa Fury of the USL W-League.

== International career ==
Trépanier was named to the Canada national team for the 2001 and 2002 Algarve Cups. She made her debut on March 11, 2001 against the United States.
