= Gina Pacheco =

Canadian soccer player

Personal information
- Full name: Gina Marie Pacheco
- Date of birth: February 28, 1990 (age 36)
- Place of birth: Sarnia, Ontario, Canada
- Height: 5 ft 1 in (1.55 m)
- Position: Midfielder

Youth career
- Sarnia Spirit
- Ottawa Fury

College career
Years	Team	Apps	(Gls)
2008–2011	South Florida Bulls	77	(5)

Senior career*
Years	Team	Apps	(Gls)
- Ottawa Fury FC

International career
2010	Canada U20	4	(0)
2009	Canada	1	(0)
- * Club domestic league appearances and goals

Gina Marie Pacheco (born February 28, 1990) is a former Canadian soccer player who played as a midfielder.

== Early life ==
Born in Sarnia, her father was born in the Azores islands in Portugal and her mother was born in Greater Sudbury, Ontario. She began playing youth soccer at the age of 3 with the Sarnia Spirit. She played with 10 year olds when she was 7, and spent a year with the U13 boys team, being named MVP. In 2006, she moved to Ottawa, joining the Ottawa Fury Academy. She served as team captain, named team MVP, and was named to the Super Y League all star teams in 2006 and 2007.

In 2008, she began attending the University of South Florida, playing for the women's soccer team. She scored her first goal in 2008 against the Illinois State Redbirds.

== Club career ==
She played club soccer for the Ottawa Fury.

== International career ==
In 2009, she was called up to the Canada national team for a pair of friendlies against the United States. She made her debut and sole appearance for the senior squad on July 19 against the US, coming on as a substitute for Kara Lang.

She was named to the Canada U20 for the 2010 CONCACAF Women's U-20 Championship.

In 2009, she was a nominee for Canadian U20 women's player of the year.
