= Pan Lina =

Chinese footballer

Personal information
- Date of birth: 18 July 1977 (age 49)
- Place of birth: China
- Position: Midfielder

International career
Years	Team	Apps	(Gls)
2000	China		
Medal record
Women's football
Representing China
Asian Games
Silver medal – second place	2002 Busan	Team
Bronze medal – third place	2006 Doha	Team

Pan Lina (born 18 July 1977) is a Chinese former football midfielder who played the China women's national football team. She participated at the 2000 Summer Olympics, but did not play. She participated at the 2003 Women's World Cup, and 2007 Women's World Cup.
