= Tina Romagnuolo =

Canadian soccer player

Personal information
- Full name: Concettina Romagnuolo
- Date of birth: February 3, 1990 (age 36)
- Place of birth: Scarborough, Ontario, Canada
- Height: 1.63 m (5 ft 4 in)
- Position: Midfielder

Youth career
- Richmond Hill SC

College career
Years	Team	Apps	(Gls)
2008–2011	Syracuse Orange	54	(17)
2012	Miami Hurricanes	9	(2)

Senior career*
Years	Team	Apps	(Gls)
2007	Toronto Lady Lynx		
2008	Vancouver Whitecaps Prospects		
2009–2010	Ottawa Fury		
2011	Vancouver Whitecaps		
2012	Ottawa Fury		

International career
2008	Canada U20	2	(0)
2011	Canada	1	(0)
- * Club domestic league appearances and goals

Concettina Romagnuolo (born February 3, 1990) is a former Canadian soccer player who played as a midfielder.

== Early life ==
Romagnuolo began playing soccer at the age of three in Scarborough before making her rep debut at age six, later playing competitively in Markham, Oshawa, Ajax and Richmond Hill. Romagnuolo was a member of the U14 Ontario team that won a bronze and the U16 squad that won two gold medals, as well as winning silver at the 2005 Canada Summer Games with Team Ontario.

In 2008, she began attending Syracuse University, playing for the women's soccer team, redshirting her first season. In 2009, she scored her first goal in the season opener against St. Bonaventure, finishing her rookie season with nine goals and 18 points, leading the team in scoring and All-BIG EAST Second Team, BIG EAST All-Academic Team, and All-Rookie Team honours. She was once again named to the All-BIG EAST Second Team in 2010 and in 2011 was named to the All-Tournament Team. Over 54 games with the Orange, she scored 17 goals.

In 2012, she moved to the University of Miami, where she scored two goals in nine games before suffering a season-ending injury on September 16 against Duke.

== Club career ==
After training with the Toronto Lady Lynx in 2006, Romagnuolo joined the club in 2007. She was named the team Rookie of the Year.

In 2008, she played with the Vancouver Whitecaps Prospects in the Pacific Coast Soccer League.

In 2009 and 2010, she played with the Ottawa Fury.

In 2011, she played with the Vancouver Whitecaps.

She later played with the Ottawa Fury, winning the 2012 USL W-League season.

== International career ==
Romagnuolo has received call-up to Canadian youth sides since she was 15.

She made her only appearance for the Canada senior team on September 22, 2011, against the United States.

== Later life ==
She later completed her master's degree at the University of Windsor, where she was able to intern with Major League Soccer club Toronto FC through a partnership between the University of Windsor and Maple Leafs Sports and Entertainment.
