= Marie-Claude Gaudel =

French computer scientist (born 1946)

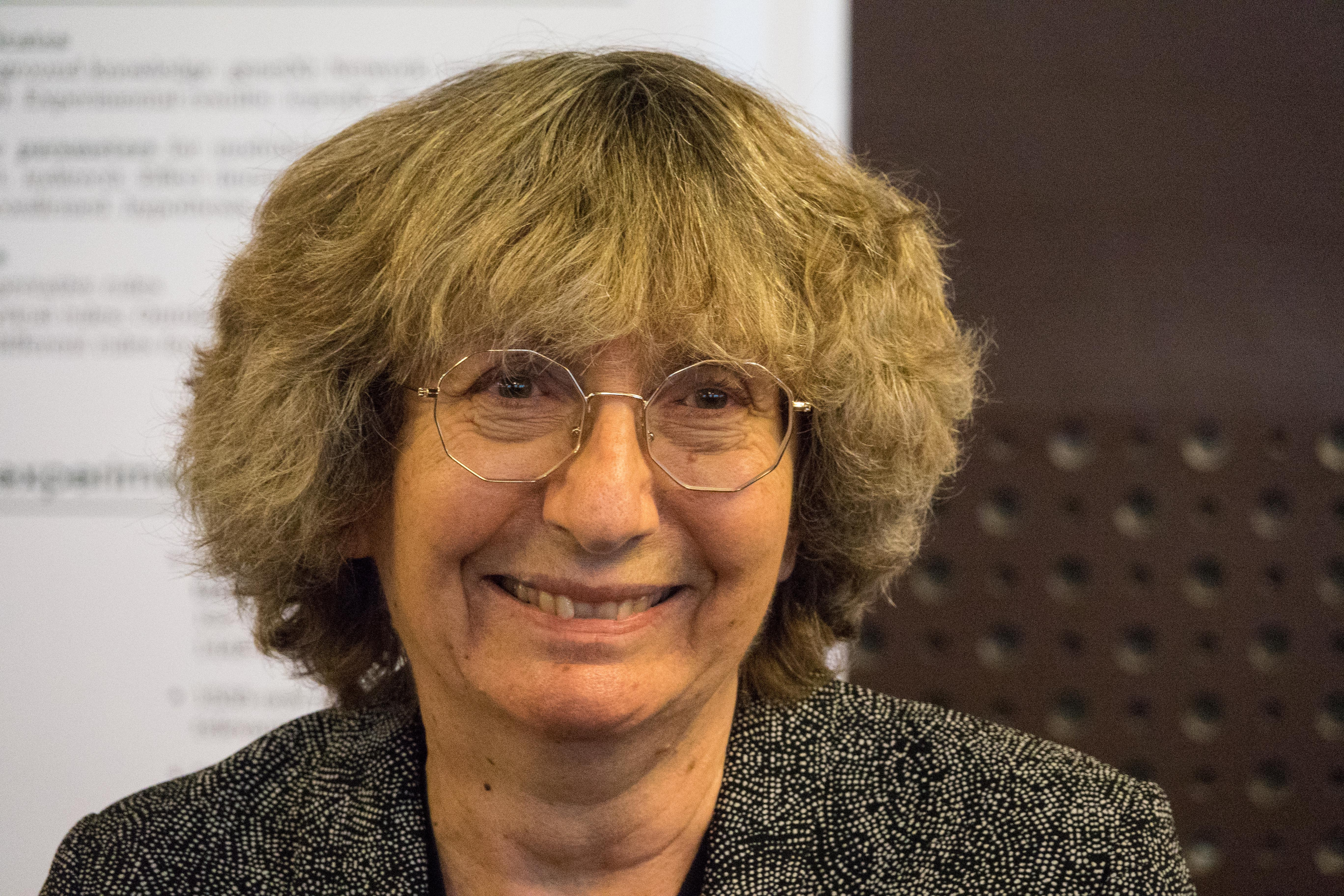
- Marie-Claude Gaudel at LRI (Laboratoire de Recherche en Informatique), during the `MCG Day' organised in her honor on september 26, 2019.
- Born: 1946 (age 79–80); Nancy, France
- Occupation: Professor Emeritus of Computer Science at University of Paris-Sud
- Known for: Mathematics, Computer Science

Marie-Claude Gaudel (born 1946) is a French computer scientist. She is a professor emerita at the University of Paris-Sud. She helped develop PLUSS language for software specifications and was involved in both theoretical and applied computer science. Gaudel is still active in professional societies.

== Early life and education ==
Marie-Claude Gaudel was born in 1946 in Nancy, France, into a family of scientists and mathematicians. She attended the University of Nancy and graduated with a Masters in Mathematics and Fundamental Applications in 1968. She obtained three more degrees from the University of Nancy: a DEA of Mathematics in 1969, a Postgraduate Doctorate in Computer Science in 1971, and a Doctorate of State in 1980.

== Career ==
In 1973, while still studying at the University of Nancy, Gaudel began working as a researcher at the French Institute for Research in Computer Science and Automation (INRIA). From 1981 to the beginning of 1984, Gaudel managed the Software Engineering group at the industrial research centre of Alcatel-Alsthom in Marcoussis, France.

In 1984, she became a professor at the University of Paris-Sud at Orsay. Her work there focused on software testing, particularly testing based on formal specifications.

In the 1980s and 1990s, Gaudel helped to develop the PLUSS language, which is used for software specifications, and the ASSPEGIQUE specification environment. She worked on the theoretical and practical side of computer science, developing a theory of software testing, formal testing, and applying her insights to real-world industrial problems. Her research group also developed the LOFT system for selecting test data.

In the 2000s, Gaudel worked on three main projects. She tested software specified in the Circus language with researchers from the University of York, researched approximate software verification, and developed algorithms for random software testing and analysis.

Gaudel retired from the University of Paris-Sud in March 2007 but continues to be a member of a number of programme committees, including serving as chair for several conferences on formal testing. She edits for the journals The Science of Computer Programming and Formal Aspects of Computing and continues to be active in the scientific community.

== Awards and honors ==
- Doctor Honoris Causa from EPFL, Switzerland, 1995
- Silver Medal of the CNRS, 1996
- Knight of the Legion of Honour, 2011
- Honorary Member of the Société Informatique de France, 2013
- Doctor Honoris Causa from the University of York, England, 2013

== Selected publications ==
Gaudel has authored or co-authored numerous publications during her time at the University of Paris-Sud and since retirement. Some of the most cited ones are listed below:

- G. Bernot, M.-C. Gaudel and B. Marre. (1991): "Software Testing Based on Formal Specifications: A theory and a tool," Software Engineering Journal, vol. 9, no. 6, pp. 387–405.
- M.-C. Gaudel. (1995): "Testing can be formal, too", Colloquium on Trees in Algebra and Programming, pp. 82–96.
- L. Bougé, N. Choquet, L. Fribourg, and M.-C. Gaudel. (1986): "Test sets generation from algebraic specifications using logic programming", Journal of Systems and Software, vol. 6, no. 4, pp. 343–360.
