= 2011–12 2. Frauen-Bundesliga =

2. Bundesliga (women)
- Season: 2011–12
- Champions: Turbine Potsdam II (North); VfL Sindelfingen (South)
- Promoted: FSV Gütersloh 2009; VfL Sindelfingen
- Relegated: FCR 2001 Duisburg II; Borussia Mönchengladbach; Mellendorfer TV; FV Löchgau

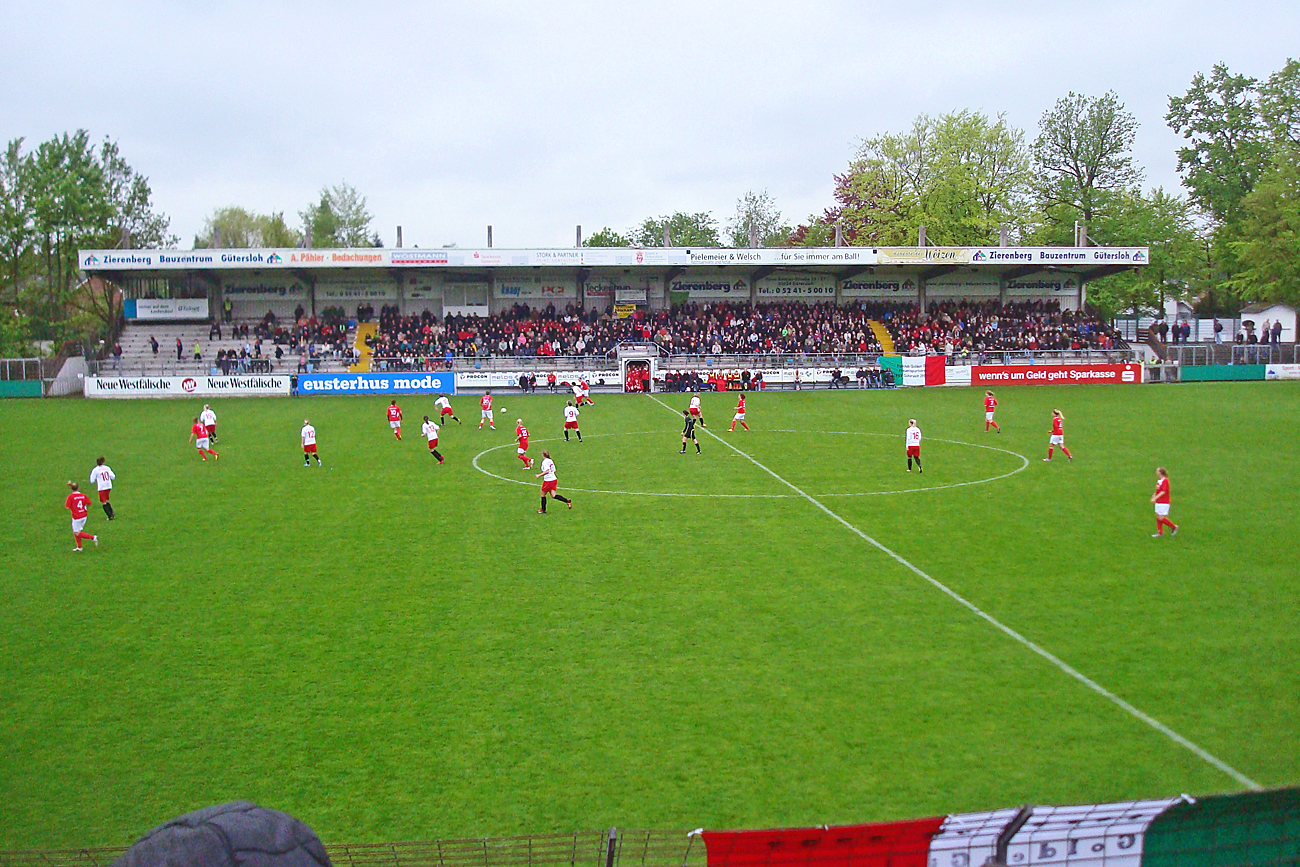
FSV Gütersloh 2009 (red) vs. Mellendorfer TV (white). 1502 spectators saw the 15–0 victory of the FSV.

The 2011–12 season of the Women's 2nd Bundesliga was the eighth season of Germany's second-tier women's football league. It began on 28 August 2011 and the regular season ends on 20 May 2012.

The play-off between 10th placed teams didn't take place because Hamburg went from the Bundesliga down to the Regionalliga and only 4 relegations were needed.

== Final standings ==
=== North ===
Pos	Team	Pld	W	D	L	GF	GA	GD	Pts	Qualification or relegation
1	Turbine Potsdam II (C)	22	17	3	2	77	16	+61	54	
2	FSV Gütersloh 2009 (P)	22	16	4	2	79	15	+64	52	Promotion to 2012–13 Bundesliga (Note: The reserve team of Potsdam won the title but is ineligible for promotion due to the first team playing in the Bundesliga. Gütersloh as the next placed team were given the spot.)
3	BV Cloppenburg	22	14	3	5	58	28	+30	45	
4	Herforder SV Borussia Friedenstal	22	13	4	5	62	27	+35	43	
5	Werder Bremen	22	9	4	9	38	37	+1	31	
6	Magdeburger FFC	22	8	4	10	29	34	−5	28	
7	SV Meppen	22	7	5	10	32	38	−6	26	
8	1. FC Lübars	22	7	4	11	23	42	−19	25	
9	FF USV Jena II	22	6	6	10	31	35	−4	24	
10	FFC Oldesloe	22	6	3	13	24	58	−34	21	
11	FCR 2001 Duisburg II (R)	22	5	5	12	26	47	−21	20	Relegation to 2012–13 Regionalliga
12	Mellendorfer TV (R)	22	1	1	20	19	122	−103	4	Relegation to 2012–13 Regionalliga

Updated to match(es) played on 28 May 2012. Source: kicker.de (in German)
Rules for classification: 1) points; 2) goal difference; 3) number of goals scored.
(C) Champions; (P) Promoted; (R) Relegated

=== South ===
Pos	Team	Pld	W	D	L	GF	GA	GD	Pts	Qualification or relegation
1	VfL Sindelfingen (C, P)	22	18	2	2	63	14	+49	56	Promotion to 2012–13 Bundesliga
2	1899 Hoffenheim	22	15	3	4	56	26	+30	48	
3	TSV Crailsheim	22	9	6	7	42	32	+10	33	
4	1. FC Köln	22	10	3	9	36	28	+8	33	
5	FFC Frankfurt II	22	9	6	7	38	37	+1	33	
6	1. FFC 08 Niederkirchen	22	10	3	9	43	44	−1	33	
7	Bad Neuenahr II	22	9	3	10	27	32	−5	30	
8	1. FC Saarbrücken	22	8	5	9	37	34	+3	29	
9	Bayern Munich II	22	8	4	10	41	36	+5	28	
10	ETSV Würzburg	22	7	2	13	43	53	−10	23	
11	Borussia Mönchengladbach (R)	22	6	5	11	28	39	−11	23	Relegation to 2012–13 Regionalliga
12	FV Löchgau (R)	22	1	2	19	22	101	−79	5	Relegation to 2012–13 Regionalliga

Updated to match(es) played on 28 May 2012. Source: kicker.de (in German)
Rules for classification: 1) points; 2) goal difference; 3) number of goals scored.
(C) Champions; (P) Promoted; (R) Relegated
