= Friedrich-Ludwig-Jahn-Stadion =

Multi-use stadium in Herford, Germany

- Interactive map of Friedrich-Ludwig-Jahn-Stadion
- Location: Herford, Germany
- Coordinates: 52°6′19″N 8°41′17″E
- Owner: HSV Borussia Friedenstal
- Operator: HSV Borussia Friedenstal
- Capacity: 30,000 (record); 18,400 (current)

Construction
- Opened: 1955

Tenant
- HSV Borussia Friedenstal

Friedrich-Ludwig-Jahn-Stadion is a multi-use stadium in Herford, Germany. Matches of HSV Borussia Friedenstal are held in this stadium. The capacity of the stadium is 18,400 spectators.
