= Tanya Franck =

Canadian soccer player

Personal information
- Date of birth: 13 December 1974 (age 51)
- Place of birth: North York, Ontario, Canada
- Height: 1.68 m (5 ft 6 in)
- Position: Midfielder

College career
Years	Team	Apps	(Gls)
1993	Arkansas–Little Rock Trojans		
1994–1997	Nebraska Cornhuskers		

International career^{‡}
1997–2000	Canada	29	(3)
- ‡ National team caps and goals as of 19 June 1999 (before the 1999 FIFA Women's World Cup)

Tanya Franck (born 13 December 1974) is a Canadian soccer player who played as a midfielder for the Canada women's national soccer team. She was part of the team at the 1999 FIFA Women's World Cup.
