= Kylla Sjoman =

Canadian soccer player (born 1987)

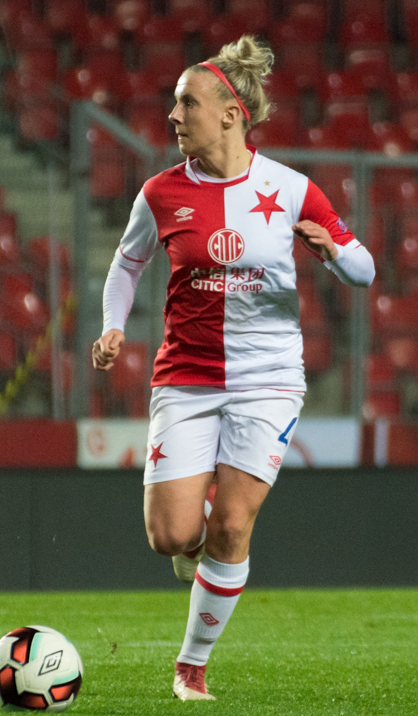

Personal information
- Full name: Kylla Liisa Sjoman
- Date of birth: 18 August 1987 (age 39)
- Place of birth: New Westminster, Canada
- Height: 1.65 m (5 ft 5 in)
- Position: Defender

Youth career
- Burnaby Jazz
- 2005–2008: Arizona State Sun Devils

Senior career*
Years	Team	Apps	(Gls)
2007	Ottawa Fury	11	(1)
2009	Boston Renegades	5	(0)
2010	Phoenix del Sol		
2010	Burnaby Canadians		
2011	Doncaster Rovers Belles	13	(1)
2012–2013	Herforder SV	30	(3)
2013–2015	Celtic	7	(0)
2014	→ Herforder SV (loan)	4	(0)
2016–2018	Sunderland	18	(0)
2018–2020	SK Slavia Prague		

International career^{‡}
2013–2020	Canada	2	(0)
- * Club domestic league appearances and goals as of 12 June 2016 ‡ National team caps and goals as of 4 March 2014

Kylla Liisa Sjoman (born 18 August 1987) is a former Canadian soccer player from Burnaby, British Columbia. She played for SK Slavia Prague and Celtic L.F.C. of the Scottish Women's Premier League. She has also represented the Canada women's national soccer team at senior international level, making her debut against England in April 2013.

== Early life ==
Sjoman was born in New Westminster to Pentti and Julie Sjoman. Her father is a Finn from Kajaani, and she also has Finnish citizenship.

== Club career ==
A versatile left-sided player with joint Canadian–Finnish citizenship, in 2010 Sjoman signed a deal to play for Doncaster Rovers Belles while living at the Ramada Jarvis hotel in Doncaster with Áine O'Gorman and Maria Karlsson.

After a spell in Germany, Sjoman signed for Celtic in August 2013. She returned to Herforder SV in February 2014.

In January 2016, Sjoman left Celtic for Sunderland and was happy to be back in the FA WSL: "The set up here at Sunderland is the most professional environment I have experienced since coming overseas and the players and staff have made it an easy transition for me."

== International career ==
Sjoman returned to South Yorkshire in April 2013 with the Canadian national team, making her senior national team debut in a 1–0 friendly defeat to England at New York Stadium in Rotherham.

== See also ==
- Foreign players in the FA WSL
