= Ottawa Fury (women) =

Former women's soccer team based in Ottawa, Ontario, Canada

Ottawa Fury Women
- Full name: Ottawa Fury Women
- Nickname: The Fury
- Founded: 2000
- Dissolved: 2014
- Stadium: Algonquin College Soccer Complex
- Capacity: 2,000
- Owner: John Pugh
- Coach: Dominic Oliveri
- League: USL W-League
| Home colours | Away colours |

Ottawa Fury Women was a Canadian women's soccer team based in Ottawa, Ontario. Founded in 2000, the team was a member of the United Soccer Leagues USL W-League, the second tier of women's soccer in the United States and Canada. The team competed in the W-League's Central Conference with the rest of the league's Canadian clubs.

The team was part of the Ottawa Fury FC organization, which included the Ottawa Fury FC men's professional team, the Academy and the former semi-professional team Ottawa Fury SC. The women's team was disbanded following the 2014 season.

== History ==
The Ottawa Fury was founded as a women's team in 2000 by Andy Nera, who served as owner and coach, to compete in the USL W-League. The team failed to make the playoffs in each of their first two seasons.

In 2002, the team was purchased by John Pugh. In 2004, the Fury captured their first division title in 2004 (the first of nine consecutive) and their first conference title in 2005. In 2005, the Fury added a men's team, Ottawa Fury SC in the semi-professional Premier Development League.

They advanced to the League Championship final in 2005 and 2006, losing both years to the New Jersey Wildcats and Vancouver Whitecaps, respectively. In 2007, they posted their first undefeated season, with a record of 11 wins and 1 draw.

After clinching their ninth consecutive Central Division title, the Fury women captured the 2012 League title, defeating the Pali Blues in the championship final on penalty kicks, which was hosted in Ottawa.

Following the formation of the professional men's team, Ottawa Fury FC, the women's team adopted the Fury FC branding and logo for the 2014 season. After the 2014 season, in which the team finished the regular season undefeated and coming in third-place in the league championship tournament, the team folded in "a business decision to cease operation", with the organization focusing on it the men's professional team. Despite folding the women's team, the club remained committed to its girls development program through the Elite Girls Academy and other grassroots and community initiatives. The disbanding of the team occurred just days ahead of the 2015 FIFA Women's World Cup official draw in Ottawa. The Fury women had amassed the second-most wins in W-League history.

== Head coaches ==
| Coach | Tenure |
|---|---|
| Andy Nera | 2000–2002 |
| Frank Lofranco | 2003–2007 |
| Craig Smith | 2008–2010 |
| Dominic Oliveri | 2011–2014 |

== Year-by-year ==
| Year | League | Record | Rank | League Championship | Ref |
|---|---|---|---|---|---|
| 2000 | USL W-League | 6–3–5 | 3rd, Northern Division | did not qualify | |
| 2001 | USL W-League | 5–3–6 | 5th, Northern Division | did not qualify | |
| 2002 | USL W-League | 5–2–5 | 4th, Northern Division | did not qualify | |
| 2003 | USL W-League | 11–1–2 | 2nd, Northern Division | Semi-finals | |
| 2004 | USL W-League | 13–0–1 | 1st, North Central Division | Semi-Finals | |
| 2005 | USL W-League | 13–0–1 | 1st, Northern Division | Finalists | |
| 2006 | USL W-League | 10–1–1 | 1st, Northern Division | Finalists | |
| 2007 | USL W-League | 11–1–0 | 1st, Northern Division | Quarter-finals | |
| 2008 | USL W-League | 13–0–1 | 1st, Northern Division | Quarter-finals | |
| 2009 | USL W-League | 11–2–1 | 1st, Great Lakes Division | Semi-finals | |
| 2010 | USL W-League | 8–3–1 | 1st, Great Lakes Division | Quarter-finals | |
| 2011 | USL W-League | 12–0–0 | 1st, Great Lakes Division | Finalists | |
| 2012 | USL W-League | 10–0–2 | 1st, Central Division | Champions | |
| 2013 | USL W-League | 7–2–3 | 2nd, Central Conference | Quarter-finals | |
| 2014 | USL W-League | 11–1–0 | 1st, Central Conference | Semi-finals | |

== Awards and honours ==
Ottawa Fury Women have won the following USL W-League awards:

- Champions: 1 (2012)
- Conference Champions: 3 (2005, 2006, 2014)
- Division Champions: 10 (2004, 2005, 2006, 2007, 2008, 2009, 2010, 2011, 2012, 2014)

== Stadium ==
- Algonquin College Soccer Complex; Ottawa, Ontario (2008–2014)
- Keith Harris Stadium; Ottawa, Ontario (2000–2007)

== Notable former players ==
The following Fury players have played at the senior international level:

- (Canada) Leisha Alcia
- (Canada) Rachelle Beanlands
- (Canada) Melanie Booth
- (Canada) Kadeisha Buchanan
- (Canada) Melissa Busque
- (Canada) Linda Consolante
- (Canada) Tanya Dennis
- (Canada) Robyn Gayle
- (Canada) Christina Julien
- (Canada) Kristina Kiss
- (Canada) Alyssa Lagonia
- (Canada) Ashley Lawrence
- (Canada) Véronique Maranda
- (Canada) Diana Matheson
- (Canada) Bryanna McCarthy
- (Canada) Kinley McNicoll
- (Canada) Isabelle Morneau
- (Canada) Carmelina Moscato
- (Canada) Alyscha Mottershead
- (Canada) Marie-Ève Nault
- (Canada) Christabel Oduro
- (Canada) Gina Pacheco
- (Canada) Kelly Parker
- (Canada) Sari Raber
- (Canada) Leah Robinson
- (Canada) Tina Romagnuolo
- (Canada) Tania Singfield
- (Canada) Kylla Sjoman
- (Canada) Taryn Swiatek
- (Canada) Noel Trépanier
- (Canada) Danielle Vella
- (Canada) Amy Vermeulen
- (Canada) Rhian Wilkinson
- (Canada) Danica Wu
- (Canada) Shelina Zadorsky
- (Jamaica) (Canada) Tiffany Cameron
- (Guyana) (Canada) Briana DeSouza
- (United States) Katie Bethke
- (United States) Kelly Conheeney
- (United States) Britt Eckerstrom
- (United States) Arin Gilliland
- (United States) Courtney Wetzel
- (United States) Kat Williamson
- (Australia) Tameka Butt
- (Australia) Emily Gielnik
- (Australia) Katrina Gorry
- (Australia) Aivi Luik
- (Australia) Gema Simon
- (Australia) Servet Uzunlar
- (New Zealand) Hayley Bowden
- (New Zealand) Amber Hearn
- (New Zealand) Emma Kete
- (New Zealand) Liz Milne
- (New Zealand) Ria Percival
- (England) Rachael Axon
- (England) (Australia) Kristy Moore
- (England) Jodie Taylor
- (England) Faye White
- (Norway) Leni Larsen Kaurin
- (Norway) Lisa-Marie Woods
- (Republic of Ireland) Ciara McCormack
- (Northern Ireland) Kellie Leyland
- (Poland) (Canada) Kayla Adamek
