= 2003 USL W-League season =

USL W-League
- Season: 2003
- Champions: Hampton Roads Piranhas (1st Title)
- Regular Season title: Boston Renegades (1st Title)
- Matches: 166
- Goals: 679 (4.09 per match)
- Best Player: (Canada) Phebe Trotman Vancouver Whitecaps Women
- Top goalscorer: (United States) Carrie Kveton Boston Renegades (United States) Jeanette Akerlund Ottawa Fury Women (14 goals each)
- Best goalkeeper: (United States) Meredith Flaherty Hampton Roads Piranhas

The 2003 W-League Season was the 9th season of the USL W-League, the second-highest division of women's soccer in the United States. The Boston Renegades were the defending champions. The Hampton Roads Piranhas were crowned champions after defeating the Chicago Cobras in the Championship game.

== Changes from the 2002 season ==
=== Format changes ===
The league went to the standard FIFA match points format: 3 points for a win (down from the previous 4), 1 for a draw, 0 for a loss, and eliminated bonus points for 3 or more goals scored.

=== Name changes ===
One team changed their name in the off-season:

Team name	Metro area	Previous name
(British Columbia) Vancouver Whitecaps Women	Vancouver area	Vancouver Breakers

=== Expansion teams ===
One team joined the league ahead of the start of the season:

Team name	Metro area	Location	Previous affiliation
(Ohio) Columbus Lady Shooting Stars	Columbus area	Columbus, OH	Expansion

=== Teams leaving ===
Two teams left to join the WPSL:

- Maryland Pride
- Rhode Island Rays

Eight teams folded after the 2002 season:

- Albuquerque Crush
- Jacksonville Jade
- Kansas City Mystics
- Kentucky Fillies
- Memphis Mercury
- Oklahoma Outrage
- Tampa Bay Xtreme
- Texas Odyssey

== Standings ==
Blue indicates division title clinched
Green indicates playoff berth clinched

=== Central Conference ===
==== Atlantic Division ====
Pos	Team	Pld	W	L	T	GF	GA	GD	Pts
1	Hampton Roads Piranhas	12	12	0	0	33	5	+28	36
2	Charlotte Lady Eagles	12	9	3	0	35	11	+24	27
3	Northern Virginia Majestics	12	5	7	0	16	21	−5	15
4	Asheville Splash	12	3	9	0	14	24	−10	9
5	Greensboro Twisters	12	2	10	0	8	34	−26	6

==== Midwest Division ====
Pos	Team	Pld	W	L	T	GF	GA	GD	Pts
1	Chicago Cobras	12	10	1	1	33	8	+25	31
2	Northern Kentucky TC Stars	12	5	5	2	16	21	−5	17
3	Columbus Lady Shooting Stars	12	4	5	3	11	15	−4	15
4	Cincinnati Ladyhawks	12	4	7	1	12	17	−5	13
5	Windy City Bluez	12	3	8	1	18	29	−11	10

=== Eastern Conference ===
==== Northeast Division ====
Pos	Team	Pld	W	L	T	GF	GA	GD	Pts
1	New Jersey Lady Stallions	14	11	3	0	36	11	+25	33
2	Long Island Lady Riders	14	9	5	0	35	21	+14	27
3	New Jersey Wildcats	14	7	7	0	29	20	+9	21
4	New York Magic	14	7	7	0	33	25	+8	21
5	South Jersey Banshees*	14	1	13	0	8	48	−40	0 (Note: South Jersey had 3 points deducted for violations.)

==== Northern Division ====
Pos	Team	Pld	W	L	T	GF	GA	GD	Pts
1	Boston Renegades	14	13	0	1	60	5	+55	40
2	Ottawa Fury Women	14	11	2	1	61	9	+52	34
3	Toronto Inferno	14	6	7	1	32	31	+1	19
4	New Hampshire Lady Phantoms	14	3	11	0	21	53	−32	9
5	Rochester Ravens	14	0	13	1	4	96	−92	1

=== Western Conference ===
Pos	Team	Pld	W	L	T	GF	GA	GD	Pts
1	Vancouver Whitecaps Women	12	10	1	1	51	10	+41	31
2	Seattle Sounders Women	12	8	3	1	35	8	+27	25
3	Denver Lady Cougars	12	6	4	2	36	24	+12	20
4	Arizona Heatwave	12	6	6	0	21	24	−3	18
5	Fort Collins Force	12	3	8	1	16	39	−23	10
6	Mile High Mustangs	12	0	11	1	5	62	−57	1

== Playoffs ==
=== Format ===
Four teams from both the Central and Eastern Conferences and two from the Western Conference qualified for the playoffs. All playoff matchups were in single-leg elimination tournament format with the higher seeded team hosting until the national semifinals. Seeding was determined by league record, with the Boston Renegades seeded first with 39 points. The host of the national semifinals was determined by bids at the 2002 USL Annual General Meeting.

In the Central and Eastern Conferences, the top two teams from each division played, and then divisional winners played for the conference championship and to advance to the national semifinals.

The top two teams in the Western Conference, having only one division, played each other to advance to the semifinals.

As hosts, the Hampton Roads Piranhas received a bye into the W-League national semifinals, with the third-place team from the Atlantic Division receiving a playoff berth. The W-League Championship final was televised live on Fox Sports World.

=== Conference Brackets ===
Central Conference

Divisional Championships
MW1	(Illinois) Chicago Cobras	9
MW2	Northern Kentucky TC Stars	1
AT1	(North Carolina) Charlotte Lady Eagles	4
AT2	Northern Virginia Majestics	1

Central Championship
MW1	(Illinois) Chicago Cobras	3
AT1	(North Carolina) Charlotte Lady Eagles	1

Eastern Conference

Divisional Championships
NO1	(Massachusetts) Boston Renegades	2
NO2	(Ontario) Ottawa Fury Women	3
NE1	New Jersey Lady Stallions	4
NE2	(New York (state)) Long Island Lady Riders	2

Eastern Championship
NO2	(Ontario) Ottawa Fury Women	4
NE1	New Jersey Lady Stallions	2

Western Conference

Western Finals
W1	(British Columbia) Vancouver Whitecaps Women (AET/PK)	2 (1)
W2	(Washington (state)) Seattle Sounders Women	2 (3)

=== W-League Championship Bracket ===
Semifinals
WL	(Virginia) Hampton Roads Piranhas	4
W2	(Washington (state)) Seattle Sounders Women	1
MW1	(Illinois) Chicago Cobras	3
NO2	(Ontario) Ottawa Fury Women	0

Championship
WL	(Virginia) Hampton Roads Piranhas	1
MW1	(Illinois) Chicago Cobras	0
Third Place
W2	(Washington (state)) Seattle Sounders Women	4
NO2	(Ontario) Ottawa Fury Women	1

=== Divisional Championships ===
July 31, 2003
14:00 EDT

(Illinois) Chicago Cobras	9 − 1	Northern Kentucky TC Stars
Sitch 14'; Cooper 18', 49', 59'; Grubb 28' (pen.); Feulner 66'; Graczyk 67', 83', 89'	Report	Hoffbauer 69'

Mooseheart Memorial Stadium
Mooseheart, Illinois

July 31, 2003

(North Carolina) Charlotte Lady Eagles	4 − 1	Northern Virginia Majestics
Timbers 39', 47', 62'; Swinehart 66'	Report	McBean 45'

E. E. Waddell High School
Charlotte, North Carolina
Attendance: 523

July 31, 2003

(Massachusetts) Boston Renegades	2 − 3	(Ontario) Ottawa Fury Women
Totman 40'; Rahko 87'	Report	Vermeulen 44' (pen.); Alfa 79'; Akerlund 82'

Bowditch Field
Framingham, Massachusetts

July 30, 2003

New Jersey Lady Stallions	4 − 2	(New York (state)) Long Island Lady Riders
Negron 16'; Mathelier 47', 56'; Sinram 77'	Report Report 2	Forde 28'; Bracco 45'

DePaul High School
Wayne, New Jersey
Attendance: 100

=== Conference championships ===
August 2, 2003
22:00 EDT

(British Columbia) Vancouver Whitecaps Women	2 − 2 (AET)	(Washington (state)) Seattle Sounders Women
Andrews 9'; Neil 65'	Report	Frimpong 42', 43'
Penalties
Hicks (penalty scored); Timko (penalty missed); Lang (penalty missed); Potis (penalty missed)	1 − 3	(penalty scored) McIntosh; (penalty scored) Rodrick; (penalty scored) Van Blommestein

Swangard Stadium
Burnaby, British Columbia
Attendance: 4,089
Referee: Martin Reid (USA)

August 3, 2003
14:00 EDT

(Illinois) Chicago Cobras	3 − 1	(North Carolina) Charlotte Lady Eagles
Feulner 6'; Greene 67'; Sitch 72'	Report	Murphy 60'

Mooseheart Memorial Stadium
Mooseheart, Illinois

August 3, 2003
16:00 EDT

(Ontario) Ottawa Fury Women	4 − 2	New Jersey Lady Stallions
Alfa 11', 15', 53'; McConville 75'	Report	Negron 30'; Flamini 37'

Keith Harris Stadium
Ottawa, Ontario
Attendance: 800

=== W-League Semifinals ===
August 8, 2003
17:00 PM EDT

(Virginia) Hampton Roads Piranhas	4 − 1	(Washington (state)) Seattle Sounders Women
Borski 46', 55'; Hibbs 73'; Ritchie 90'	Report	Frimpong 15'

Landstown HS Stadium
Virginia Beach, Virginia
Attendance: 1,006
Referee: Chip Boatright (USA)

August 8, 2003
19:30 PM EDT

(Illinois) Chicago Cobras	3 − 0	(Ontario) Ottawa Fury Women
Graczyk 12', 90'; Sitch 58'	Report

Landstown HS Stadium
Virginia Beach, Virginia

=== W-League Third Place ===
August 10, 2003
14:30 PM EDT

(Ontario) Ottawa Fury Women	4 − 1	(Washington (state)) Seattle Sounders Women
Frimpong 2', 6'; Mueller 11'; Milyak 82'	Report	Alfa 65'

Landstown HS Stadium
Virginia Beach, Virginia
Attendance: 1,237
Referee: Dan Stead (USA)

=== W-League Championship ===
August 10, 2003
17:00 PM EDT

(Virginia) Hampton Roads Piranhas	1 − 0	(Illinois) Chicago Cobras
Akide 96'	Report

Landstown HS Stadium
Virginia Beach, Virginia
Attendance: 1,237

== Season statistics ==
- Scoring Champion: (United States) Jeanette Akerlund (Ottawa Fury Women) and (Canada) Kelly Parker (Ottawa Fury Women) (32 points)
- Goal Scoring Champion: (United States) Jeanette Akerlund (Ottawa Fury Women) and (United States) Carrie Kveton (Boston Renegades) (14 goals)
- Assist Leader: (Canada) Rhian Wilkinson (Ottawa Fury Women) (7 assists)

=== Top scorers ===
Rank	Player	Club	Goals
1	(United States) Carrie Kveton	Boston Renegades	14
1	(United States) Jeanette Akerlund	Ottawa Fury Women	14
3	(Canada) Phebe Trotman	Vancouver Whitecaps Women	13
3	(Canada) Kelly Parker	Ottawa Fury Women	13
5	(United States) Jessica Reifer	New York Magic	10
5	(United States) Mary Everett	Denver Lady Cougars	10
5	(United States) Noelle Meeke	New York Magic	10
8	Diana Artuso	Vancouver Whitecaps Women	8
8	(United States) Melissa Shulman	Long Island Lady Riders	8
8	(United States) Carolyn Theurer	Denver Lady Cougars	8

=== Top assists ===
Rank	Player	Club	Goals
1	(Canada) Rhian Wilkinson	Ottawa Fury Women	7
2	(United States) Abby Leopold	Boston Renegades	6
2	(United States) Megan Beasley	Denver Lady Cougars	6
2	(United States) Melissa Bennett	Seattle Sounders Women	6
2	(United States) Caitlin Fisher	Boston Renegades	6
2	(United States) Carolyn Theurer	Denver Lady Cougars	6
2	(Canada) Kelly Parker	Ottawa Fury Women	6
8	(Canada) Kelly Haxton	Vancouver Whitecaps Women	5
8	(Nigeria) Mercy Akide	Hampton Roads Piranhas	5
8	(Canada) Martina Franko	Vancouver Whitecaps Women	5

== Awards ==
- Most Valuable Player: (Canada) Phebe Trotman (Vancouver Whitecaps Women)
- Rookie of the Year: (Australia) Stacey Stocco (Boston Renegades)
- Defender of the Year: (United States) Fanta Cooper (Chicago Cobras)
- Coach of the Year: (United States) Mike Nesci (Chicago Cobras)
- Goalkeeper of the Year: Meredith Flaherty (Hampton Roads Piranhas)
- Championship MVP: (Nigeria) Mercy Akide (Hampton Roads Piranhas)

The W-League Championship All-Tournament Team was announced on August 10, 2003:

F: (United States) Tina Frimpong (Seattle Sounders Women), (United States) Kristen Graczyk (Chicago Cobras), (Nigeria) Mercy Akide (Hampton Roads Piranhas)
M: (United States) Melissa Bennett (Seattle Sounders Women), (Nigeria) Florence Omagbemi (Hampton Roads Piranhas), (United States) Darci Borski (Hampton Roads Piranhas), (Canada) Kelly Parker (Ottawa Fury Women)
D: (United States) Jenna Szyluk (Hampton Roads Piranhas), (United States) Fanta Cooper (Chicago Cobras), (United States) Josha Krueger (Chicago Cobras)
G: (United States) Meredith Flaherty (Hampton Roads Piranhas)

== All-League and All-Conference Teams ==
The All-Conference Teams were announced on August 1, 2003. The All-League Team was announced on August 4.

=== Central Conference ===
G: (United States) Meredith Flaherty (Hampton Roads Piranhas) *
D: (United States) Fanta Cooper (Chicago Cobras) *, (United States) Deanna Kriedel (Charlotte Lady Eagles), (United States) Erin Showalter (Cincinnati Ladyhawks)
M: (Nigeria) Florence Omagbemi (Hampton Roads Piranhas), (United States) Elizabeth Ramsey (Chicago Cobras), (United States) Julianne Sitch (Chicago Cobras) *, (United States) Sarah Wall (Columbus Lady Shooting Stars)
F: (Nigeria) Mercy Akide (Hampton Roads Piranhas) *, (United States) Andrea Cunningham (Cincinnati Ladyhawks), (United States) Annette Kent (Windy City Bluez)

=== Eastern Conference ===
G: (United States) Meghan Frey (Boston Renegades)
D: (Canada) Linda Consolante (Ottawa Fury Women), (United States) Francesca DeCristoforo (Long Island Lady Riders) *, (United States) Caitlin Fisher (Boston Renegades)
M: (United States) Sue Flamini (New Jersey Stallions), (Canada) Kelly Parker (Ottawa Fury Women) *, (United States) Melissa Shulman (Long Island Lady Riders), (Australia) Stacey Stocco (Boston Renegades) *
F: (United States) Jeanette Akerlund (Ottawa Fury Women), (United States) Carrie Kveton (Boston Renegades), (United States) Jessica Reifer (New York Magic) *

=== Western Conference ===
G: (United States) Megan Miller (Seattle Sounders Women)
D: (Canada) Sasha Andrews (Vancouver Whitecaps Women) *, (United States) Shannon Forslund (Seattle Sounders Women), (United States) Amy Gray Denver Lady Cougars
M: (United States) Kacy Beitel (Denver Lady Cougars), (United States) Tara Kidwell (Fort Collins Force), (Canada) Andrea Neil (Vancouver Whitecaps Women), (United States) Tracey Spinelli (Arizona Heatwave) *
F: (United States) Janelle Munnis (Seattle Sounders Women), (United States) Carolyn Theurer (Denver Lady Cougars), (Canada) Phebe Trotman (Vancouver Whitecaps Women) *

* denotes All-League player

== See also ==
- 2003 PDL Season
