= 2004 USL W-League season =

USL W-League
- Season: 2004
- Champions: Vancouver Whitecaps Women (1st Title)
- Regular Season title: New Jersey Wildcats (1st Title)
- Matches: 251
- Goals: 1,120 (4.46 per match)

The 2004 W-League Season was the league's 10th. The Vancouver Whitecaps Women won the W-League title, defeating the New Jersey Wildcats 4-2 in Ottawa.

== Changes from 2003 season ==
=== Name changes ===
One team changed their name in the off-season:

Team name	Metro area	Previous name
(North Carolina) Carolina Dynamo	Greensboro area	Greensboro Twisters

=== Expansion teams ===
Fourteen teams were added for the season:

Team name	Metro area	Location	Previous affiliation
(Florida) Bradenton Athletics	Sun Coast area	Bradenton, FL	expansion
(Alberta) Calgary Wildfire	Calgary area	Calgary, AB	expansion
(Ohio) Cleveland Internationals Women	Cleveland area	Cleveland, CA	expansion
(Michigan) Detroit Jaguars	Detroit area	Livonia, ON	expansion
(Alberta) Edmonton Aviators Women	Edmonton area	Edmonton, AB	expansion
(Indiana) Fort Wayne Fever	Fort Wayne area	Fort Wayne, IN	expansion
(Ontario) London Gryphons	London area	London, ON	expansion
(Quebec) Montreal Xtreme	Montreal area	Montreal, QC	expansion
Rhode Island Stingrays	Providence area	Providence, RI	WPSL
(Virginia) Richmond Kickers Destiny	Richmond area	Richmond, VA	expansion
(Missouri) St. Louis Archers	St. Louis area	St. Louis, MO	expansion
(Ontario) Sudbury Canadians	Sudbury area	Sudbury, ON	expansion
(Massachusetts) Western Mass Lady Pioneers	Springfield area	Ludlow, MA	expansion
West Michigan Firewomen	Grand Rapids area	Grand Rapids, MI	expansion

=== Teams leaving ===
Two teams folded after the 2004 season:

- New Jersey Lady Stallions
- Northern Kentucky TC Stars

== Standings ==
Orange indicates bye into W-League semifinals as host.
Blue indicates division title clinched
Green indicates playoff berth clinched

=== Central Conference ===
==== Atlantic Division ====
Pos	Team	Pld	W	L	T	GF	GA	GD	Pts
1	Hampton Roads Piranhas	14	12	1	1	30	8	+22	37
2	Charlotte Lady Eagles	14	11	2	1	45	16	+29	34
3	Asheville Splash	14	7	4	3	32	13	+19	24
4	Richmond Kickers Destiny	14	5	7	2	32	29	+3	17
5	Carolina Dynamo Women	14	5	8	1	24	35	−11	16
6	Northern Virginia Majestics	14	2	11	1	17	44	−27	7
7	Bradenton Athletics	14	2	11	1	18	53	−35	7

==== Midwest Division ====
Pos	Team	Pld	W	L	T	GF	GA	GD	Pts
1	Chicago Cobras	13	12	0	1	42	12	+30	37
2	Fort Wayne Fever	13	10	2	1	48	16	+32	31
3	Detroit Jaguars	13	8	5	0	33	18	+15	24
4	Cleveland Internationals Women	13	7	6	0	27	16	+11	21
5	Cincinnati Ladyhawks	13	4	9	0	14	28	−14	12
6	Windy City Bluez	13	4	9	0	21	39	−18	12
7	West Michigan Firewomen	13	1	12	0	6	36	−30	3
8	London Gryphons (Note: St. Louis folded after two games, and London played three games as an associate member.)	3	1	2	0	4	16	−12	3
9	St. Louis Archers	2	0	2	0	18	45	−27	0

=== Eastern Conference ===
==== New England Division ====
Pos	Team	Pld	W	L	T	GF	GA	GD	Pts
1	Boston Renegades	14	10	4	0	56	28	+28	30
2	Western Mass Lady Pioneers	14	7	7	0	30	23	+7	21
3	New Hampshire Lady Phantoms	14	3	11	0	13	40	−27	9
4	Rhode Island Stingrays	14	2	12	0	10	68	−58	6

==== North Central Division ====
Pos	Team	Pld	W	L	T	GF	GA	GD	Pts
1	Ottawa Fury Women	14	13	1	0	68	7	+61	39
2	Montreal Xtreme	14	11	3	0	57	19	+38	33
3	Rochester Ravens	14	8	6	0	33	26	+7	24
4	Toronto Inferno	14	3	11	0	13	38	−25	9
5	Sudbury Canadians	14	1	13	0	15	77	−62	3

==== Northeast Division ====
Pos	Team	Pld	W	L	T	GF	GA	GD	Pts
1	New Jersey Wildcats	14	14	0	0	76	5	+71	42
2	Long Island Lady Riders	14	11	3	0	48	29	+19	33
3	New Jersey Lady Stallions	14	10	4	0	44	22	+22	30
4	New York Magic	14	3	11	0	13	47	−34	9
5	South Jersey Banshees	14	2	12	0	13	65	−52	6

=== Western Conference ===
Pos	Team	Pld	W	L	T	GF	GA	GD	Pts
1	Vancouver Whitecaps Women	14	13	0	1	57	11	+46	40
2	Seattle Sounders Women	14	11	2	1	44	12	+32	34
3	Edmonton Aviators Women	14	7	5	2	21	16	+5	23
4	Denver Lady Cougars	14	6	7	1	24	25	−1	19
5	Arizona Heatwave	14	6	7	1	25	36	−11	19
6	Mile High Mustangs	14	4	7	3	18	34	−16	15
7	Calgary Wildfire	14	2	12	0	13	41	−28	6
8	Fort Collins Force	14	1	10	3	18	45	−27	6

== Playoffs ==
=== Format ===
Seven teams each from the Eastern Conference, four teams from the Central Conference and two from the Western Conference qualify for the playoffs. The Ottawa Fury Women received a bye into the W-League semifinals as hosts. All matchups are in a one-leg format.

In the Central Conference, the Division champions play the second-place team from the same division, who will play each other to advance to the W-League Semifinals.

In the Eastern Conference, the top two teams in each division play each other, except for the Division champion with the best record, that receives a bye to the Conference Semifinals, and Ottawa, who has a bye to the W-League Semifinals. The team with the worst record in the Conference Semifinals plays the team with the Divisional Finals bye, and the other two teams play each other. The winners play to advance to the W-League Semifinals.

The two teams in the Western Conference will play each other to advance to the W-League Semifinals.

=== Conference Brackets ===
Central Conference

Divisional Finals
MW1	(Illinois) Chicago Cobras	3
MW2	(Indiana) Fort Wayne Fever	2
A1	(Virginia) Hampton Roads Piranhas	0
A2	(North Carolina) Charlotte Lady Eagles	2

Central Finals
MW	(Illinois) Chicago Cobras (AET)	3
A2	(North Carolina) Charlotte Lady Eagles	2

Eastern Conference

Division Finals
NWE1	(Massachusetts) Boston Renegades (AET)	1
NWE2	(Massachusetts) Western Mass Lady Pioneers	0
NC1	(Quebec) Montreal Xtreme	3
NC2	(New York (state)) Rochester Ravens	0
NE2	(New York (state)) Long Island Lady Riders (AET)	1
NE3	New Jersey Lady Stallions	0

Eastern Semifinals
NE1	New Jersey Wildcats	2
NWE1	(Massachusetts) Boston Renegades	0
NC1	(Quebec) Montreal Xtreme (AET)	6
NE2	(New York (state)) Long Island Lady Riders	5

Eastern Championship
NE1	New Jersey Wildcats	6
NC1	(Quebec) Montreal Xtreme	5

Western Conference

Western Finals
W1	(British Columbia) Vancouver Whitecaps Women	1
W2	(Washington (state)) Seattle Sounders Women	0

=== W-League Championship Bracket ===
Semifinals
H	(Ontario) Ottawa Fury Women	1
NE1	New Jersey Wildcats	2
W1	(British Columbia) Vancouver Whitecaps Women	2
MW1	(Illinois) Chicago Cobras	1

Championship
NE1	New Jersey Wildcats (AET/PK)	0 (2)
W1	(British Columbia) Vancouver Whitecaps Women	0 (4)
Third Place
H	(Ontario) Ottawa Fury Women	1
MW1	(Illinois) Chicago Cobras	0

=== Divisional Round ===
July 27, 2004
7:30 PM EDT

(Massachusetts) Boston Renegades	1 - 0 (AET)	(Massachusetts) Western Mass Lady Pioneers
Welcome 104'	Report

Bowditch Stadium
Boston, Massachusetts
Attendance: 400
Referee: Niko Bratsis (USA)

July 28, 2004
5:00 PM EDT

(Quebec) Montreal Xtreme	3 - 0	(New York (state)) Rochester Lady Rhinos
Bilodeau (yellow card) 41'; Morneau 45'; Le Palme 51'; Holland 81'	Report	Vieira (yellow card) 14'

Soccerplexe Catalogna
Montreal, Quebec
Attendance: 647
Referee: Carole Anne Chenara (USA)

July 28, 2004
8:30 PM EDT

(New York (state)) Long Island Lady Riders	1 - 0 (AET)	New Jersey Lady Stallions
Stansfield (yellow card) 44'; Prinzevalli (yellow card) 90'; Shulman 104'	Report

Kenneth P. Lavalle Stadium
Stony Brook, New York
Attendance: 1,865
Referee: Richard Sanchez (USA)

=== Conference semifinals ===
July 28, 2004

(Virginia) Hampton Roads Piranhas	0 - 2	(North Carolina) Charlotte Lady Eagles
	Report	Okosieme 19'; Swinehart 63'

Virginia Wesleyan College
Virginia Beach, Virginia
Attendance: 565
Referee: Scott Johnson (USA)

July 28, 2004
7:00 PM CDT

(Illinois) Chicago Cobras	3–2	(Indiana) Fort Wayne Fever
Graczyk 21' 41'; Lindenmuth 67'	Report	Cinalli 45' (yellow card) 68'; Boland 85' (PK)

Mooseheart Memorial Stadium
Mooseheart, Illinois
Attendance: 390

July 31, 2004
5:00 PM EDT

(New York (state)) Long Island Lady Riders	4 - 5 (AET)	(Quebec) Montreal Xtreme
McCabe 4'; Mustonen 8'; O'Brien 26'; Stansfield 35'; DeCristoforo (yellow card) 63'; Mullen (yellow card) 74'	Report	Lesage 6' 17'; Vanderpool 41' 57'; Bilodeau (yellow card) 69'; None (yellow card) 77'; Pinard 117'

Mercer County Community College
West Windsor, New Jersey
Attendance: 676
Referee: Teri O'Connor (USA)

July 31, 2004
7:30 PM EDT

New Jersey Wildcats	2 - 0	(Massachusetts) Boston Renegades
Makinen 18' 55' (PK)	Report	Munoz (yellow card) 25'; Frederick (yellow card) 39'

Mercer County Community College
West Windsor, New Jersey
Attendance: 676
Referee: John Schleckman

=== Conference finals ===
July 31, 2004
7:00 PM PDT

(British Columbia) Vancouver Whitecaps Women	1 - 0	(Washington (state)) Seattle Sounders Women
Franko 45'; Neil (yellow card) 90'	Report

Swangard Stadium
Burnaby, British Columbia
Attendance: 3,886
Referee: Jill Proctor (USA)

August 1, 2004
1:00 PM CDT

(Illinois) Chicago Cobras	2 - 1 (AET)	(North Carolina) Charlotte Lady Eagles
Bogus 81'; Schneider (yellow card) 85'; B. Cooper 100'	Report	Cooper 26' (OG)

Mooseheart Memorial Stadium
Mooseheart, Illinois
Attendance: 110
Referee: Victor Herrera (USA)

August 1, 2004
5:00 EDT

New Jersey Wildcats	6 - 5	(Quebec) Montreal Xtreme
Pichon 16' 21' 44' (yellow card) 79' (goal) 85' 89'; Makoski 65'	Report	Walsh 45'; Vaillancourt 47' 55' 90'; Pinard (yellow card) 48'; Hemsley 66'

Mercer County Community College
West Windsor, New Jersey
Attendance: 645
Referee: Hossam Saad (USA)

=== W-League Semifinals ===
August 7, 2004

(Ontario) Ottawa Fury Women	1 - 2	New Jersey Wildcats
Matheson (red card) 32'; Robinson 83' (PK)	Report	Pichon 35' (PK), 68'; Makoski (yellow card) 45'; MacNamara (yellow card) 72'; J. Willis (yellow card) 82'

Keith Harris Stadium
Ottawa, Ontario
Attendance: 850

August 7, 2004

(British Columbia) Vancouver Whitecaps Women	2 - 1	(Illinois) Chicago Cobras
Neil 53'; Allen 58'	Report	Janss 68'

Keith Harris Stadium
Ottawa, Ontario
Attendance: 850

=== W-League Third Place ===
August 8, 2004

(Ontario) Ottawa Fury Women	1 - 0	(Illinois) Chicago Cobras
Vermeulen 11'	Report

Keith Harris Stadium
Ottawa, Ontario

=== W-League Finals ===
August 8, 2004

New Jersey Wildcats	0 - 0	(British Columbia) Vancouver Whitecaps Women
	Report
Penalties
Makinen (penalty missed); Pichon (penalty missed); St. Louis (penalty scored); Makoski (penalty scored)	2 – 4	(penalty scored) Franko; (penalty scored) Neil; (penalty scored) Lang; (penalty scored) McLeod

Keith Harris Stadium
Ottawa, Ontario

== See also ==
- United Soccer Leagues 2004
- 2004 PDL Season
