= 2002 USL W-League season =

W-League
- Season: 2002
- Champions: Boston Renegades (2nd Title)
- Regular Season title: Charlotte Lady Eagles (1st Title)
- Matches: 217
- Goals: 909 (4.19 per match)

The 2002 W-League Season was the league's 8th.

== Teams ==
- Albuquerque Crush
- Arizona Heatwave
- Asheville Splash
- Boston Renegades
- Charlotte Lady Eagles
- Chicago Red Eleven
- Cincinnati Ladyhawks
- Jacksonville Jade
- Kansas City Mystics
- Kentucky Fillies
- Long Island Rough Riders
- Maryland Pride
- Memphis Mercury
- Mile High Edge
- New Hampshire Lady Phantoms
- New Jersey Lady Stallions
- New Jersey Wildcats
- New York Magic
- Northern Kentucky TC Stars
- Northern Virginia Majestics
- Oklahoma Outrage
- Ottawa Fury Women
- Piedmont Spark
- Rhode Island Lady Stingrays
- Rochester Ravens
- Seattle Sounders Women
- South Jersey Banshees
- Tampa Bay Xtreme
- Toronto Inferno
- Virginia Beach Piranhas

== Championship Weekend ==
=== Semifinals ===
August 9, 2002

Boston Renegades	2–1	Denver Lady Cougars
Gray 40' (o.g.); Bowie 69'	Report	Duren 88'

Swangard Stadium, Burnaby, British Columbia
August 9, 2002

Vancouver Breakers	1–1	Charlotte Lady Eagles
Hicks 82'	Report	Murphy 47'
Penalties
Penalty scored Penalty missed	4–5	(penalty scored) Lewis

Swangard Stadium, Burnaby, British Columbia
Attendance: 2,485

=== Third Place Game ===
August 10, 2002
4:30 PM

Vancouver Breakers	2–0	Denver Lady Cougars
Apps 85'; Artuso 90'	Report

Swangard Stadium, Burnaby, British Columbia
Attendance: 1,569
- Boston Renegades 3-0 Charlotte Lady Eagles
August 10, 2002

Boston Renegades	3–0	Charlotte Lady Eagles
Splaine 23'; O'Grady 54', 61'	Report

Swangard Stadium, Burnaby, British Columbia
Attendance: 1,569

== See also ==
- 2002 PDL Season
