= 2005 USL W-League season =

USL W-League
- Season: 2005
- Champions: New Jersey Wildcats (1st Title)
- Regular Season title: Ottawa Fury Women (1st Title)
- Matches: 238
- Goals: 931 (3.91 per match)

The 2005 W-League Season was the USL W-League's 11th season.

== Changes from 2004 season ==
=== Name changes ===
Three teams changed their name in the off-season:

Team name	Metro area	Previous name
(Illinois) Chicago Gaels	Chicago area	Chicago Cobras
(Colorado) Mile High Edge	Boulder area	Mile High Mustangs
Real Colorado Cougars	Denver area	Denver Lady Cougars

=== Expansion teams ===
Five teams were added for the season:

Team name	Metro area	Location	Previous affiliation
(Georgia (U.S. state)) Atlanta Silverbacks Women	Atlanta area	Atlanta, GA	expansion
Central Florida Krush	Orlando area	Winter Park, FL	expansion
(California) San Diego Gauchos Women	San Diego area	San Diego, CA	expansion
(Ontario) Toronto Lady Lynx	Toronto area	Toronto, ON	expansion
Vermont Lady Voltage	Burlington area	St. Albans, VT	expansion

=== Teams leaving ===
One team left for the WPSL:

- St. Louis Archers

Eight teams folded after the 2004 season:

- Asheville Splash
- Calgary Wildfire
- Columbus Lady Shooting Stars
- Edmonton Aviators Women
- Montreal Xtreme
- Rhode Island Lady Stingrays
- Toronto Inferno
- Windy City Bluez

== Standings ==
Orange indicates W-League title and bye into W-League semifinals.
Blue indicates division title clinched
Green indicates playoff berth clinched

=== Central Conference ===
==== Atlantic Division ====
Pos	Team	Pld	W	L	T	GF	GA	GD	Pts
1	Charlotte Lady Eagles	14	11	2	1	37	11	+26	34
2	Central Florida Kraze	14	11	3	0	32	13	+19	33
3	Atlanta Silverbacks Women	14	8	5	1	30	20	+10	25
4	Hampton Roads Piranhas	14	5	6	3	28	29	−1	18
5	Richmond Kickers Destiny	14	6	8	0	20	23	−3	18
6	Northern Virginia Majestics	14	5	9	0	22	33	−11	15
7	Bradenton Athletics	14	4	7	3	12	25	−13	15
8	Carolina Dynamo Women	14	1	11	2	10	37	−27	5

==== Midwest Division ====
Pos	Team	Pld	W	L	T	GF	GA	GD	Pts
1	Detroit Jaguars	14	11	3	0	38	13	+25	33
2	Cleveland Internationals Women	14	9	5	0	36	20	+16	27
3	London Gryphons	14	8	4	2	31	18	+13	26
4	Cincinnati Ladyhawks	14	6	7	1	33	40	−7	19
5	Fort Wayne Fever	14	5	9	0	24	36	−12	15
6	Chicago Gaels	14	4	8	2	27	38	−11	14
7	West Michigan Firewomen	14	3	10	1	21	45	−24	10

=== Eastern Conference ===
==== Northeast Division ====
Pos	Team	Pld	W	L	T	GF	GA	GD	Pts
1	New Jersey Wildcats	14	13	1	0	57	2	+55	39
2	Boston Renegades	14	9	5	0	43	23	+20	27
3	Long Island Rough Riders	14	8	6	0	21	14	+7	24
4	Western Mass Lady Pioneers	14	7	6	1	17	16	+1	22
5	New York Magic	14	5	8	1	19	26	−7	16
6	New Hampshire Lady Phantoms	14	3	11	0	14	56	−42	6 (Note: New Hampshire was docked 3 points for violations.)
7	South Jersey Banshees	14	1	13	0	6	57	−51	3

==== Northern Division ====
Pos	Team	Pld	W	L	T	GF	GA	GD	Pts
1	Ottawa Fury Women	14	13	1	0	64	7	+57	39
2	Toronto Lady Lynx	14	11	3	0	44	16	+28	33
3	Vermont Lady Voltage	14	7	7	0	21	21	0	21
4	Sudbury Canadians	14	3	11	0	15	50	−35	9
5	Rochester Ravens	14	3	11	0	14	50	−36	9

=== Western Conference ===
Pos	Team	Pld	W	L	T	GF	GA	GD	Pts
1	Vancouver Whitecaps Women	14	13	1	0	47	4	+43	39
2	Arizona Heatwave	14	10	3	1	40	17	+23	31
3	Mile High Edge	14	10	4	0	40	20	+20	30
4	Real Colorado Cougars	14	7	6	1	26	24	+2	22
5	Seattle Sounders Women	14	5	8	1	25	27	−2	16
6	Fort Collins Force	14	2	11	1	13	44	−31	7
7	San Diego Gauchos Women	14	0	14	0	4	59	−55	0

== Playoffs ==
=== Format ===
Five teams from the Eastern Conference, four teams from the Central Conference and two from the Western Conference qualify for the playoffs. All match-ups are in a one-leg format.

In the Central Conference, the division champions play the second-place team from the opposite division.

In the Eastern Conference, the division champion with the best record receives a bye, and will play the winner of the teams with the 4th and 5th-best conference records. The other division champion will play the seventh-place team, and plays the winner of the third-place and sixth-place teams.

The two teams in the Western Conference will play each other to advance to the W-League Semifinals.

The regular season champion, New Jersey Wildcats, received a bye into the W-League semifinals, with the eighth-place team from the Eastern Conference receiving a playoff berth.

=== Conference brackets ===
Central Conference

Central Semifinals
A1	(North Carolina) Charlotte Lady Eagles	6
MW2	(Ohio) Cleveland Internationals Women	2
MW1	(Michigan) Detroit Jaguars	2
A2	Central Florida Krush	3

Central Championship
A1	(North Carolina) Charlotte Lady Eagles	0
A2	Central Florida Krush	1

Eastern Conference

Eastern Quarterfinals
E4	(New York (state)) Long Island Rough Riders	3
E5	(Massachusetts) Western Mass Lady Pioneers	1
E2	(Massachusetts) Boston Renegades	4
E7	(New York (state)) New York Magic	0
E3	(Ontario) Toronto Lady Lynx	6
E6	Vermont Lady Voltage	0

Eastern Semifinals
E1	(Ontario) Ottawa Fury Women	5
E4	(New York (state)) Long Island Rough Riders	1
E2	(Massachusetts) Boston Renegades	1
E3	(Ontario) Toronto Lady Lynx	2

Eastern Championship
E1	(Ontario) Ottawa Fury Women	2
E3	(Ontario) Toronto Lady Lynx	0

Western Conference

Western Finals
W1	(British Columbia) Vancouver Whitecaps Women	4
W2	Arizona Heatwave	0

=== W-League Championship bracket ===
Semifinals
H	New Jersey Wildcats	2
W1	(British Columbia) Vancouver Whitecaps Women	1
E1	(Ontario) Ottawa Fury Women	2
A2	Central Florida Krush	1

Championship
H	New Jersey Wildcats	3
E1	(Ontario) Ottawa Fury Women	0
Third Place
W1	(British Columbia) Vancouver Whitecaps Women	3
A2	Central Florida Krush	1

=== Divisional Round ===
July 27, 2005

(New York (state)) Long Island Rough Riders	3–1	(Massachusetts) Western Mass Lady Pioneers
O'Brien 39', 89'; Stansfield 86'	Report	Sherry 53'

Metropolitan Oval, Maspeth, New York
July 27, 2005

(Massachusetts) Boston Renegades	4–0	(New York (state)) New York Magic
Sauerbrunn 2'; Brown 18'; Stoia 30'; Welcome 48'	Report

Bowditch Field, Framingham, Massachusetts
July 27, 2005

(Ontario) Toronto Lady Lynx	6–0	Vermont Lady Voltage
Marrosszeky 15'; Everrett 35', 80'; Warner 64'; MacDougall 72'; 82' (o.g.)	Report

Centennial Park Stadium, Toronto, Ontario
Attendance: 1,515

=== Conference Semifinals ===
July 30, 2005
2:00 PM

(Massachusetts) Boston Renegades	1–2	(Ontario) Toronto Lady Lynx
Welcome 14'		Lincoln 39'; Warner 44'

Keith Harris Stadium, Ottawa, Ontario
July 30, 2005

(Ontario) Ottawa Fury Women	5–1	(New York (state)) Long Island Rough Riders
Vermeulen 17', 48'; Matheson 29'; Parker 55'; Hamel 60'	Report	Kivisto 53'

Keith Harris Stadium, Ottawa, Ontario
July 30, 2005

(Michigan) Detroit Jaguars	2–3	Central Florida Krush
Dobbyn 11', 79'	Report	Fotopoulos 37' (pen.), 64' (pen.), 74'

Lakota West High School Soccer Stadium, West Chester Township, Ohio
July 30, 2005
6:00 PM

(North Carolina) Charlotte Lady Eagles	6–2	(Ohio) Cleveland Internationals Women
Schmedes 1'; Murphy 6', 60'; Timbers-Rife 15'; Swinehart 38'; Darling 88'		Cinalli 82'; Nanchoff 85'

Lakota West High School Soccer Stadium, West Chester Township, Ohio

=== Conference Finals ===
July 30, 2005
Western Conference Championship Game

(British Columbia) Vancouver Whitecaps Women	4–0	Arizona Heatwave
Thorlakson 1'; Allen 51', 54', 74'	Report

Swangard Stadium, Vancouver, British Columbia
July 31, 2005
2:00 PM
Eastern Conference Championship Game

(Ontario) Ottawa Fury Women	2–0	(Ontario) Toronto Lady Lynx
Gayle 18'; Matheson 59' (pen.)	Report

Keith Harris Stadium, Ottawa, Ontario
Attendance: 700
July 31, 2005
Central Conference Championship Game

(North Carolina) Charlotte Lady Eagles	0–1	Central Florida Krush
	Report	Jones 55'

Lakota West High School Soccer Stadium, West Chester Township, Ohio

=== W-League Semifinals ===
August 5, 2005
5:00 PM EDT

(Ontario) Ottawa Fury Women	2–1 (a.e.t.)	Central Florida Krush
Wilkinson 56', 110'	Report	Jones 36'

Mercer County Community College, Trenton, New Jersey

August 5, 2005
7:30 PM EDT

New Jersey Wildcats	2–1	(British Columbia) Vancouver Whitecaps Women
White 8'; Welsh 53'	Report	Allen 1'

Mercer County Community College, Trenton, New Jersey
Attendance: 1,742

=== W-League Third Place Game ===
August 7, 2005
4:30 PM EDT

(British Columbia) Vancouver Whitecaps Women	3–1	Central Florida Krush
Allen 10', 11'; Tullis 73' (o.g.)	Report	Bishop 39'

Mercer County Community College, West Windsor, New Jersey
Attendance: 2,233

=== W-League Championship ===
August 7, 2005
7:00 PM EDT

New Jersey Wildcats	3–0	(Ontario) Ottawa Fury Women
Unitt 14'; White 63' (pen.); O’Reilly 70'	Report

Mercer County Community College, West Windsor, New Jersey
Attendance: 2,233

== See also ==
- United Soccer Leagues 2005
- 2005 PDL Season
