= Carrie Kveton =

American soccer player and coach (born 1980)

Personal information
- Date of birth: June 29, 1980 (age 46)
- Place of birth: Dallas, Texas, U.S.
- Position: Defender

College career
Years	Team	Apps	(Gls)
1998–2001	North Texas University	76	(25)

Senior career*
Years	Team	Apps	(Gls)
2002–2003	Boston Renegades		
2004	Charlotte Lady Eagles	13	(2)
2004–2006	Bristol Academy	37	(1)
2005	Atlanta Silverbacks Women	12	(0)
2006	Ottawa Fury Women	8	(3)
2006–2007	Varde IF		
2007–2012	Sønderjyske		
2012–2013	Fortuna Hjørring		

Managerial career
- 2014–2020: Fortuna Hjørring
- 2022–2023: FC Nordsjælland (women)
- 2023: United States U-23 WYNT
- 2023–: United States U-19 WYNT
- 2025: United States U-20 WYNT (interim)
- * Club domestic league appearances and goals

Carrie Kveton (born June 29, 1980, in Dallas, Texas) is an American soccer player who played as a midfielder and defender, before moving on to become a coach. Kveton played professionally in Denmark. She is currently the coach of the United States U-19 Women's Youth National Team.

== Playing career ==
Kveton played college soccer for North Texas University, earning All-Sun Belt Conference recognition in 2001. After college, Kveton played semi-pro soccer in the USL W-League with the Boston Renegades, where she was one of the league's leading scorers in the 2003 season. Kveton played professional soccer in Denmark, playing for Fortuna Hjørring in the 2012–2013 season.

In the summer of 2004, she played 13 matches for Charlotte Lady Eagles in the 2004 USL W-League season, scoring twice. Later that year (2004) she relocated to Europe, joining English FA Women's Premier League club Bristol Academy (known as Bristol Rovers in 2004–05). She played 37 league games, scoring once, in her two seasons at the club.

During the English off-seasons Kveton continued to play in the W-League, making 12 appearances for Atlanta Silverbacks Women in 2005, and scoring three times in eight appearances for defeated finalists Ottawa Fury Women in 2006.

Kveton signed for Varde IF in Autumn 2006, and played 12 times in all competitions for the Danish club.

== Coaching career ==
In 2014, Kveton became co-head coach of Fortuna Hjørring, before taking on the role as head coach in 2018. During her time as coach, Fortuna Hjørring won three Danish league titles in 2014, 2016, and 2018 and two Danish Cups in 2016 and 2019. Kveton moved to the National Women's Soccer League, taking on an assistant coach role for the OL Reign during the 2020 NWSL Challenge Cup and then joined the Washington Spirit as an assistant coach prior to the 2020 NWSL Fall Series. In July 2021, Kveton took on the role of Head of Player Development at FC Nordsjælland in Denmark. In February 2023, Kveton was the head coach for the United States Women's U-23 squad for their three friendlies. On May 9, 2023, U.S. Soccer announced Kveton was appointed the head coach for the United States U-19 Women's Youth National Team. Shortly after her arrival to the United States U-19 Women's Youth National Team, it was announced that the team will participate in the upcoming 2023 Pan American Games under Kveton's leadership.

Kveton holds a UEFA Pro Coaching License.

== Coaching statistics ==
As of matches played on June 3, 2024.

Coaching record by team and tenure
Team	From	To	Record				
Team	From	To	P	W	D	L	Win %
Fortuna Hjørring	2018	2020	50	33	9	8	66.0
U.S. U-23 WNT	February 1, 2023	February 28, 2023	3	1	2	0	33.3
U.S. U-19 WNT	May 9, 2023	Present	7	4	1	2	57.1
Total			60	38	12	10	63.3
