= Melanie Booth =

Canadian soccer player (born 1984)

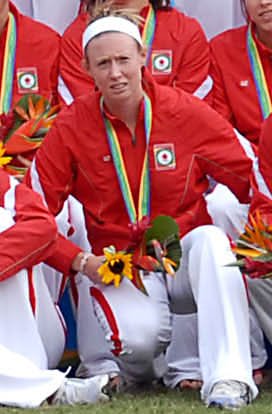

Personal information
- Full name: Melanie Lynn Booth
- Date of birth: August 24, 1984 (age 42)
- Place of birth: Burlington, Ontario, Canada
- Height: 1.73 m (5 ft 8 in)
- Position: Defender

College career
Years	Team	Apps	(Gls)
2003–2007	Florida Gators		

Senior career*
Years	Team	Apps	(Gls)
2003–2005	Toronto Inferno	13	(2)
2005	Toronto Lady Lynx	10	(7)
2006	Central Florida Krush	9	(3)
2008	Tampa Bay Hellenic	10	(0)
2009	Boston Renegades	10	(0)
2010	Vancouver Whitecaps	1	(1)
2013	Sky Blue FC	3	(0)
Total		56	(13)

International career^{‡}
2002	Canada U-19		
2002–2013	Canada	65	(1)
Medal record
Women's soccer
Representing Canada
Olympic Games
Bronze medal – third place	2012 London	Team
Pan American Games
Gold medal – first place	2011 Guadalajara	Team
Bronze medal – third place	2007 Rio de Janeiro	Team
- * Club domestic league appearances and goals ‡ National team caps and goals as of November 17, 2013

Melanie Lynn Booth (born August 24, 1984) is a Canadian retired soccer player. She last played for Sky Blue FC in the National Women's Soccer League and for the Canada women's national soccer team.

== Early life ==
Booth was born in Burlington, Ontario, Canada.

=== University of Florida ===
Booth attended the University of Florida in Gainesville, Florida, where she played for coach Becky Burleigh's Florida Gators women's soccer team from 2003 to 2005, before sitting out the 2006 season due to national team commitments. She returned to Florida in 2007 to complete her collegiate career, and graduated with a bachelor's degree in applied physiology and kinesiology in 2008.

== Playing career ==
=== Club ===
She briefly played with Ottawa Fury Women. On January 11, 2013, she joined Sky Blue FC in the new National Women's Soccer League.

=== International ===
Booth was 17 years old when she won her first cap with the Canadian national team on March 1, 2002, at the Algarve Cup (a 3–0 win over Scotland).

Booth earned 22 caps and scored three goals playing on the U-19 national team. She played every minute of Canada's six matches in the 2002 FIFA U-19 Women's World Championship, where Canada took the silver medal. She finished second with Canada at the 2006 Peace Queen Cup after a 0–1 loss to the United States in the final. She finished second with Canada at the 2006 CONCACAF Gold Cup after a 1–2 loss to the United States in the final.

She was a member of Canada's 2002 Algarve Cup and 2001 Nordic Cup teams.

Booth won a bronze medal with Canada at the 15th Pan American women's soccer tournament in July 2007 at Rio de Janeiro, Brazil. In 2007, she represented Canada at the FIFA Women's World Cup in China. She finished second with Canada at the 2008 CONCACAF Olympic qualification tournament (where Canada qualified for the Summer Olympics). She scored her first goal during the 4–0 win over Jamaica.

In the 2011 Pan-American women's soccer tournament, Booth helped Canada win the gold medal game against the defending champions, Brazil, by scoring on a penalty kick after extra-time.

Booth was named to the Canada squad for the 2012 London Olympics initially as an alternate. However, due to injuries to regular Canadian roster team players Emily Zurrer and Robyn Gayle, on Monday, July 30, 2012, the Canadian soccer coach officially added her to the team's official roster. She was later awarded an Olympic medal atop the podium at Wembley Stadium.

Booth stated, "I was standing next to Marie-Ève on the [Olympic] podium and I was the giddiest I had ever been. We were laughing about everything... Just being in Wembley in front of 60,000 people... After we got our medals (and bouquets), Marie-Ève said, 'I know these are just flowers but they're so beautiful.'"

Booth retired from international and club soccer on November 13, 2013.

== See also ==
- Florida Gators
- List of Florida Gators soccer players
- List of University of Florida alumni
