= Amy LePeilbet =

American soccer coach and former player (born 1982)

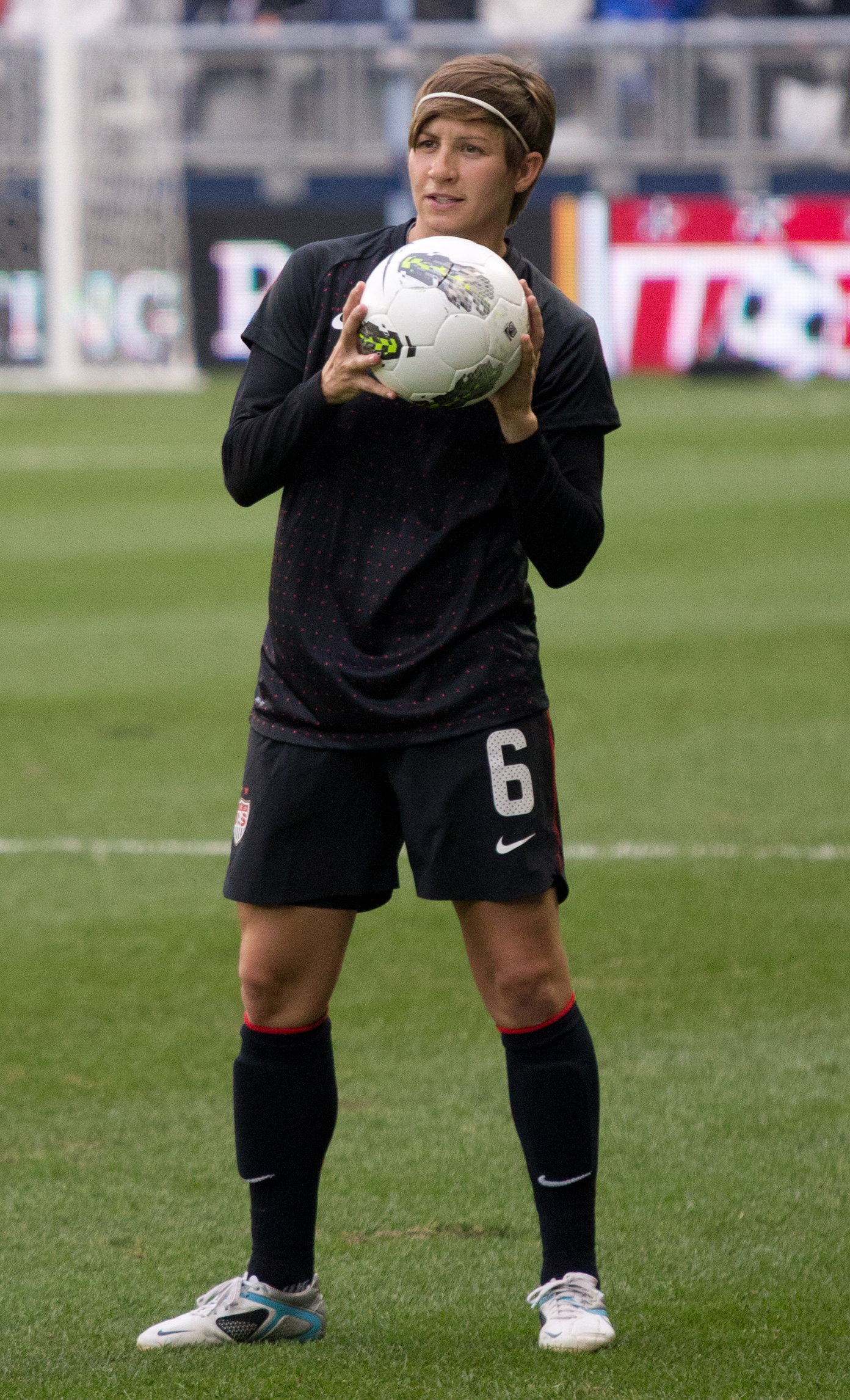
- LePeilbet at an international friendly match against Canada, in September 2011.

Personal information
- Full name: Amy Elizabeth LePeilbet
- Date of birth: March 12, 1982 (age 44)
- Place of birth: Spokane, Washington, United States
- Height: 5 ft 6 in (1.68 m)
- Position: Defender

Youth career
- 1997–2000: Prairie Ridge High School

College career
Years	Team	Apps	(Gls)
2000–2003	Arizona State Sun Devils		

Senior career*
Years	Team	Apps	(Gls)
1998–2002	Chicago Cobras		
2003–2005	Arizona Heatwave		
2008	Pali Blues	12	(2)
2009–2011	Boston Breakers	51	(0)
2013	Chicago Red Stars	0	(0)
2014–2015	FC Kansas City	31	(2)

International career^{‡}
2002–2003	United States U-21		
2004–2012	United States	84	(0)

Managerial career
- 2018–2020: Utah Royals FC (assistant)
- 2019: Utah Royals FC Reserves
- 2020: Utah Royals FC (interim)
- 2021–: Salt Lake Bruins (associate HC)
Medal record
Women's football
Representing the United States
Olympic Games
Gold medal – first place	2012 London	Team
FIFA Women's World Cup
Silver medal – second place	2011 Germany	Team
- * Club domestic league appearances and goals as of April 24, 2023 ‡ National team caps and goals as of December 15, 2012

Amy Elizabeth LePeilbet (/ləˈpɛlbət/ lə-PEL-bət; born March 12, 1982) is an American women's soccer head coach for the Salt Lake Bruins, and a retired professional and international player.

She was the interim head coach of Utah Royals FC in the National Women's Soccer League (NWSL) until its 2020 dissolution and relocation.

As a player, LePeilbet last played as a defender for FC Kansas City of the NWSL and was a member of the United States women's national team. She was an Olympic gold medalist at the 2012 London Olympics and a silver medalist at the 2011 FIFA Women's World Cup.

== Early life ==
Born in Spokane, Washington, LePeilbet attended Prairie Ridge High School in Crystal Lake, Illinois, where she lettered four years in soccer and three times in basketball. She was captain of the soccer and basketball teams during her junior and senior years.

LePeilbet was an All-Fox Valley Conference selection from 1997 to 2000, an all-sectional choice from 1998 to 2000, first-team all-area from 1999 to 2000, an all-tournament pick from 1999 to 2000, and named Most Valuable Player in 1999 and 2000. She holds the school's records for total goals (53) and assists (37) in soccer.

Prairie Ridge coach, Mike O'Brien said of her exceptional talent, "She was very versatile, even as a sophomore. She could cut both directions, she could shoot righty or lefty, she could get up on head balls. She's always been a great team player, but I'd say she is even more so now. She's an unselfish player who distributes the ball in all directions."

In 2000, she was named Northwest Herald Player of the Year and was honored with the John Mackie Senior Athlete of the Year award. She also earned the Fox Valley Scholar-Athlete and United States Marine Corps Athlete Recognition awards the same year.

=== Arizona State University ===
LePeilbet attended Arizona State University, where she majored in Sociology and graduated with Magna Cum Laude honors. Amy played for the Arizona State Sun Devils women's soccer team from 2000 to 2003. She was a three-time First-Team All-Pac-10 selection (2001–2003) and a two-time All-American.

During her freshman year, LePeilbet broke her nose halfway through the season, but continued to play. As a defender, she scored one goal (an unassisted goal against Eastern Michigan) and had one assist.

During her sophomore year, LePeilbet was considered the team's top defender. She posted one assist against Mississippi. She was named Verizon Academic All-American, was a Maroon and Gold Scholar-Athlete, and was named to the Traditional Bank All-Tournament team.

In 2002, during LePeilbet's junior year, she was considered was one of the main reasons the team tied the school record with five straight shutouts. She received an honorable mention All-American by Soccer Buzz, earned NSCAA second-team All-West Region acclaim and was named to the Soccer Buzz second-team All-West Region. LePeilbet was given All-Pac-10 First Team honors for the second straight year. She was first-team Pac-10 All-Academic, Academic All-American and all-region selection. She scored two goals and had one assist on a game-winning goal against Northern Arizona.

During her senior year, LePeilbet was a main component in helping to carry the Sun Devils into the second round of the NCAA Championships, the team's second consecutive and third NCAA appearance in the last four years. She helped the team finish with a 13–5–3 record and a final national ranking of 14th in the nation. As Arizona's top defender, LePeilbet also scored three goals, including two game-winners while leading a defense that allowed 1.05 goals per game and posted eight shutouts.

LePeilbet started all games in her career at Arizona State, playing in 74 career games. She was also a two-time Academic All-American.

== Club career ==
=== Chicago Cobras, 1998–2002 ===
LePeilbet was a member of the Chicago Cobras of the W-League from 1998 to 2002. She was one of only three high school students to be named to the team's roster. She noticed an improvement in her playing with the opportunity. "I can see much more of what's going on and I understand the game better," LePeilbet said. "At the high school level, some young players don't understand how things work. Playing with the older players on the Cobras helped me learn this. I'm much more aware of what's happening around me."

=== Arizona Heatwave, 2005 ===
In 2005, LePeilbet appeared in eight games (696 minutes) and scored one goal for the Arizona Heatwave. The Heatwave came in second in the Western Conference with a 10–3–1 record during the season.

=== Pali Blues, 2008 ===
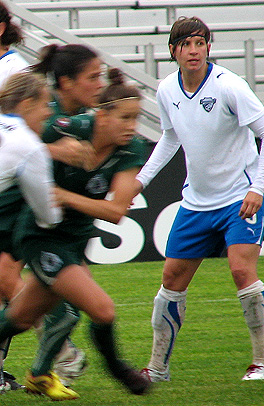
LePeilbet playing for the Boston Breakers in 2010

In 2008, she played for the Pali Blues in the Pacific Palisades area of Los Angeles, California. She appeared in 12 games (1,080 minutes), scored two goals and provided one assist.

The Blues came in first in the Western Conference with a 12–0–0 record and clinched the W-League championship title with a 2–1 win over FC Indiana. During the final, LePeilbet scored the equalizing goal with a header off of a corner kick in the 83rd minute. As a result, she was named the Most Valuable Player of the W-League Championship. She was also named to the W-League Championship All-Tournament Team.

=== Boston Breakers, 2009–11 ===
With the arrival of Women's Professional Soccer, LePeilbet was drafted by the Boston Breakers fourth overall in the 2008 WPS General Draft. In the 2009 inaugural season, she appeared in 19 games (1710 minutes), all of which were starts. Following a strong season, LePeilbet was selected the 2009 WPS Defender of the Year.

During the 2010 season, LePeilbet played every minute of 22 games for the Boston Breakers as the center of the defense and was named for the second time running the WPS Defender of the Year (the only WPS player to win the award two years back-to-back) and to the WPS All-Star Game.

In 2011, she played in 10 matches for the Breakers, but spent most of the season with the United States women's national soccer team training for and playing in the 2011 FIFA Women's World Cup.

=== Chicago Red Stars, 2013 ===
In 2013, as part of the NWSL Player Allocation, LePeilbet joined the Chicago Red Stars in the new National Women's Soccer League (NWSL). She did not play during the 2013 season due to recovery from Anterior cruciate ligament (ACL) revision surgery on her left knee. The Red Stars finished sixth during the regular season with an 8–8–6 record.

=== FC Kansas City, 2014–2015 ===
On March 31, 2014, the Chicago Red Stars traded LePeilbet to FC Kansas City for a first round pick in the 2015 college draft and an additional international slot for 2014 and 2015. She spent the first half of the season finishing rehabilitation from ACL surgery. The draft pick later became Arin Gilliland. Nearly 18 months since her last competitive game, on June 4, 2014, LePeilbet appeared in her first match for Kansas City being subbed in at left back in the 84'. In 2015, she played every minute of the regular season for Kansas City and was voted a finalist for the league Defender of the Year award and named to the Best XI. On December 28, 2015 FC Kansas City announced that LePeilbet was retiring.

== International career ==
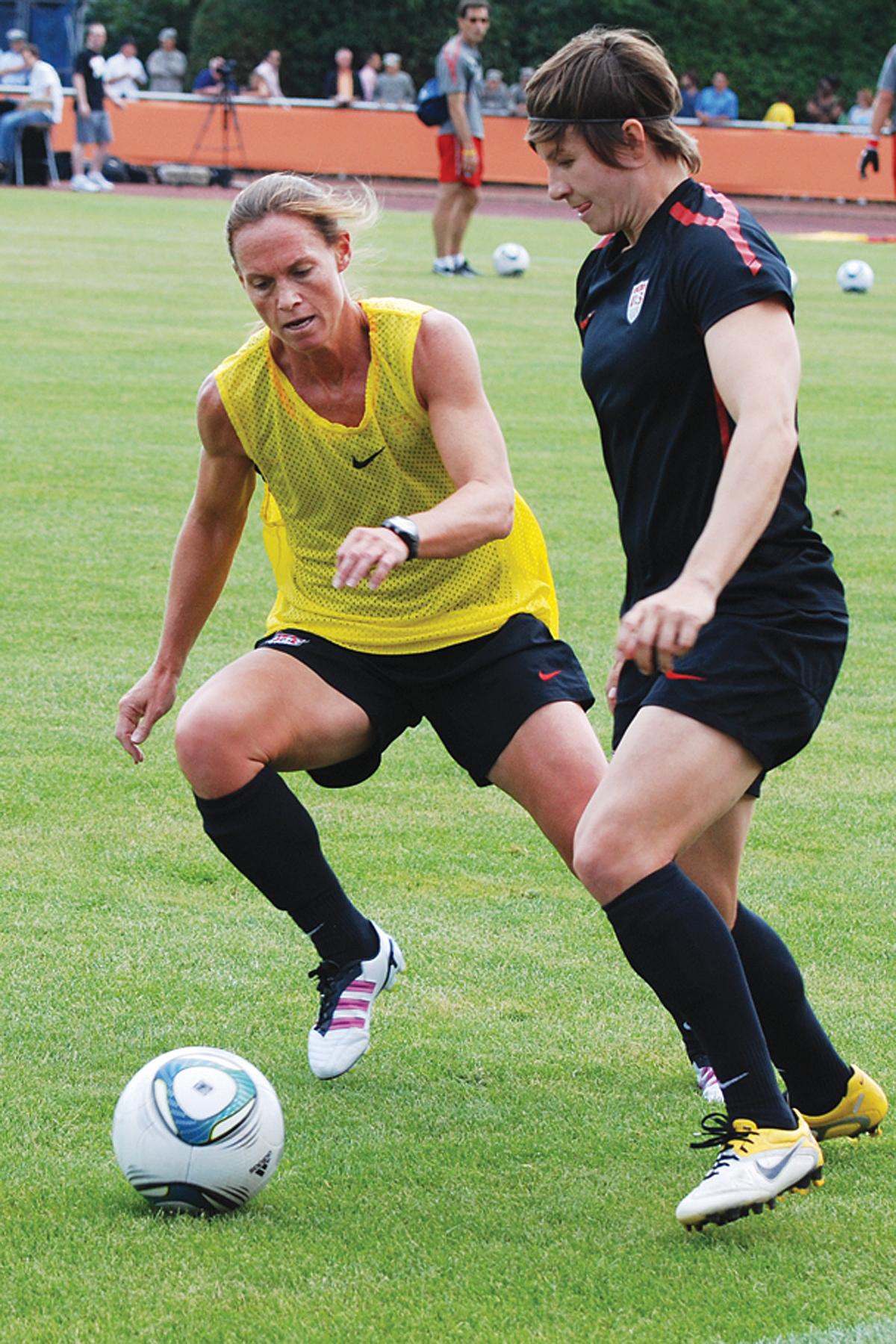
LePeilbet practices with teammate Christie Rampone during the 2011 Women's World Cup

LePeilbet was a member of the United States U-21 national team from 2002 to 2003, and played a critical role in the defensive backfield for the team that won the Nordic Cup in both 2002 and 2003. She made her first appearance for the full United States national team in 2004 against Sweden.

LePeilbet was unable to participate in the 2008 Summer Olympics in Beijing due to her recovery from a knee injury.

In 2011, LePeilbet competed in the 2011 FIFA Women's World Cup held in Germany, where the USA team finished second behind Japan. She played 535 minutes in all six matches the USA team played in Germany. She was substituted in the two group matches against Colombia and Sweden and received one yellow card in the encounter against Sweden that resulted in a penalty kick for their opponent.

LePeilbet's match record at the 2011 FIFA Women's World Cup included three wins against Korea DPR and Colombia in group stage, and France in the semifinal; one loss against Sweden in the group stage; and two draws with Brazil in the quarter-final and Japan in the final.

In May 2012, LePeilbet was one of 18 players to be named to the roster for the 2012 Summer Olympics in London. At the Games, she competed in five of the six matches that her team USA played. She accumulated 436 minutes of playing time and did not receive caution or ejection. Therefore, her match record at the 2012 Summer Olympics was five wins, no losses and no draws.

== Coaching career ==
On February 9, 2018, LePeilbet was announced as the second assistant coach for the Utah Royals for their inaugural season. She returned to the Royals for the 2019 NWSL season and on May 15, 2019, she was named the head coach of the Utah Royals FC Reserves, a semi-professional team that competes in the WPSL during the summer months.

On September 20, 2020, LePeilbet was named the interim head coach of Utah Royals FC. After the club's dissolution in December 2020 and relocation to Kansas City, LePeilbet declined to relocate with the team and instead joined the coaching staff of Salt Lake Community College Bruins women's soccer team as an associate head coach for head coach Cassie Ulrich, and was named head coach in 2023. The team competes in the National Junior College Athletic Association (NJCAA).

== Honors and awards ==
FC Kansas City

- NWSL championship: 2014, 2015

United States

- Olympic Gold Medal: 2012
- Algarve Cup: 2010, 2011
- Four Nations Tournament: 2011
- FIFA Women's World Cup Runner-up: 2011

Individual

- WPS Defender of the Year: 2009, 2010

== See also ==
- 2011 FIFA Women's World Cup squads
- All-time Boston Breakers (WPS) roster
- Annual Women's Professional Soccer awards
- List of 2012 Summer Olympics medal winners
- List of Arizona State University alumni
- List of Olympic medalists in football
- United States at the 2012 Summer Olympics
