= Long Island Rough Riders (women) =

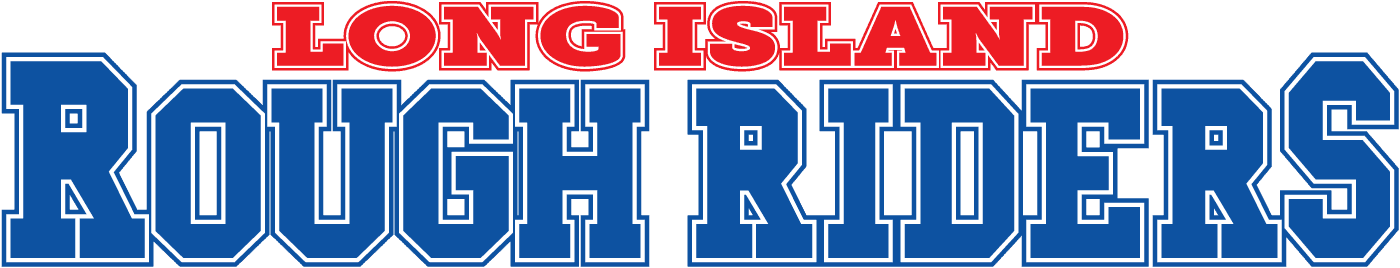
- Founded: 1994; 32 years ago
- Stadium: Mitchel Athletic Complex
- Capacity: 1,600
- Owner: Peter Zaratin
- Head Coach: Matt Lannon
- League: USL W League
- 2022: 2nd, Metropolitan Division; Playoffs: Quarterfinals
- Website: liroughriders.com/women
Home colors	Away colors

The Long Island Rough Riders, formerly known as the Long Island Lady Riders, is an American women's soccer club, based out of Long Island, New York. Founded in 1994, the team was under the ownership of Chuck Jacob, who at the time also owned the men's Long Island Rough Riders up until 1997 before selling it to Frank Boulton. At this time, the Rough Riders transitioned names and became known as the Lady Riders for several years. In 2007, the Rough Riders acquired territorial and franchise rights to the women's Lady Riders team. For the first time since 1997, the men's and women's teams would be under the same name and they have been ever since. The Rough Riders were an original member of the USL W-League and played in all 21 seasons before the league disbanded in late 2015. The team was a member of United Women's Soccer from 2016 to 2021. They now play in the second version of the USL W League.

Long Island plays its home games at Mitchel Athletic Complex. The club's colors are blue and white.

The team is a sister organization of the men's Long Island Rough Riders team, which plays in the USL League Two.

== History ==
=== Early years in the USL W-League ===
Established in 1994, the Long Island Women's Rough Riders participated in the United Soccer League W-League. Under the ownership of Chuck Jacob, the team had a successful inaugural season, winning the very first W-League Championship in 1995. During this same year, the men's Rough Riders also won a championship.

The Rough Riders finished the 1996 season in second place at 7-3-0 overall. Kim Wyant was named W-League Goalkeeper of the Year for the second consecutive season.

Long Island went 9-1-0 in 1997, topping their division. During the championship playoff series, Wyant and the Rough Riders shut out defending champions Maryland Pride, and defeated California Storm, 3-2, after winning 1-0 in the penalty shootout. During the championship match against the Chicago Cobras, the Rough Riders took the lead in the 48th minute on a goal by Jen Bauman. The Cobras scored an equalizer a few minutes later and both teams battled through overtime where the game was decided in a penalty shootout. Wyant, who was later named tournament MVP, made key saves, allowing just one goal in the shootout. Debbie Johnson scored the first goal for the Rough Riders and Teresa Petruccelli secured the game winner, leading the team to their second W-League Championship.

During the 1997 offseason, Chuck Jacob, the owners of both the men's and women's Rough Riders, sold the teams to Frank Boulton, founder/CEO of the Long Island Ducks.

=== Transition to the W-1 Division ===
Now known as the Lady Riders, the team finished in third place in the North Division at 10-4 overall, advancing to the playoffs for the second consecutive season. The Lady Riders were defeated 2-1 by Maryland in the divisional finals. Wyant was named the W-League Goalkeeper of the Year for the fourth consecutive season.

The Lady Riders went 10-4-1 in 1999, good for second place in the W-1 Division. They advanced to the divisional playoffs, losing 4-1 to Maryland in the first round. The Lady Riders also upset the Brazilian Women's National Team 2-0 in an exhibition that offseason.

In 2000, the Lady Riders finished in second place in the division at 10-3-1.

Long Island finished atop of the Eastern Conference Northeast Division in 2001 with an 11-2-1 record and 51 points, solidifying a spot in the conference playoffs. During the Conference Semifinals, the Lady Riders defeated Springfield 2-1 and advanced to the Conference Final, where they lost 3-1 to Boston.

=== Transition back to the USL W-League ===
The Lady Riders went 11-3-0 during the 2002 season in the USL W-League. Coach Emma Hayes was named the W-League Coach of the Year.

The Lady Riders ended the 2003 season in second place in the Northeast Division of the W-League at 9-5-0 (27 points). The team advanced to the divisional championships, where they were eliminated by the New Jersey Stallions, 4-2.

Long Island went 11-3-0 (33 points) the next season; good for a second-place finish and a four-consecutive playoff berth. The Lady Riders defeated the New Jersey Stallions 1-0 in the Eastern Divisional Final and moved onto the Eastern Semifinals against the Montreal Xtreme, losing 6-5.

In 2005, the Lady Riders finished the season in third place at 8-6-0 (24 points). Long Island also advanced to the playoffs for the 10th time in franchise history. The Lady Riders defeated the Western Mass Lady Pioneers 3-1 in the quarterfinals, but lost 5-1 to the Ottawa Fury Women in the next round.

The team ended the 2006 season in fourth place in the Northeast Division at 7-5-2 record and 23 points. Long Island lost 3-2 to the New Jersey Wildcats in the conference semifinals.

In 2007, Kim Wyant, the former face of the team, stepped down from her role as general manager. The Long Island Rough Riders acquired the W-League franchise, formerly known as the Long Island Lady Riders. This season was the first season since 1997 that both the men's and women's teams would be known as the Rough Riders. Under the leadership of co-head coaches John Fitzgerald and Declan McSheffrey, the team finished in sixth place in the Northeast Division at 5-7-2 (17 points). The team did not secure a berth into the playoffs.

The Rough Riders went 9-3-2 (29 points) the following season and returned to the playoffs. Brooke DeRosa scored in the 1-0 win against the Boston Renegades in the Eastern Divisional match. Long Island lost 1-0 to the Atlanta Silverbacks Women in the next round.

Following a very successful 2008 season, where the team qualified for the Conference Final Four, the Women's Rough Riders looked to return to the W-League playoffs for the second consecutive season. The team saw several key players return for the 2009 season, including Kerri McCabe and Brooke DeRosa, and welcomed U-20 United States National Team member, Gina DiMartino. Long Island finished in fourth place at 6-7-1 overall.

In 2010, the Rough Riders went 7-5-0 (21 points), finishing in fourth place in the Northeast Division. The team failed to make the playoffs for the second year in a row.

The Rough Riders went 7-1-2 in 2011, finishing atop the Northeast Division. After a two-year playoff absence, the Rough Riders lost 2-1 in the Conference Semifinal against the Charlotte Lady Eagles. The Rough Riders received the Fair Play Award for their sportsmanlike conduct throughout the season.

In 2012, the Rough Riders clinched the Northeast Division title for the second consecutive season, going 9-3-0. Long Island lost 4-0 to the Charlotte Lady Eagles in the Eastern Conference Semifinal. In the offseason, former Rough Riders standout Crystal Dunn become a U-20 World Cup Champion as she helped lead the United States to victory against Germany. Dunn, a Mac Hermann Trophy finalist, also guided the University of North Carolina to its 22nd NCAA Championship.

The 2013 season marked the return of two-time W-League Defender of the Year, Sue Alber-Weber. Finishing 6-6-0, the Rough Riders failed to secure a spot in the playoffs. In April, Vaila Barsley, a former player during the 2009–10 and 2012 seasons, signed a professional contract with Sweden's Eskilstuna United. Rough Riders defender Gabrielle Charno and midfielder Grace Hawkins were named to the W-League All-Conference Team.

Long Island finished in fifth place the following campaign at 3-4-5. Former players Crystal Dunn and Kim DeCesare were drafted to the National Women's Soccer League by the Washington Spirit and Boston Breakers, respectively.

Former Wales national football team member and recent Middle Tennessee State graduate Shan Jones joined the squad in 2015. Long Island finished in third place at 6-2-4 overall. Shan Jones, Casie Ludemann and Sue Alber-Weber were all named to the W-League All-Conference team. Jones and Alber-Weber were named to the 2015 W-League All-League team. In September, former Rough Rider Crystal Dunn was voted the MVP of the National Women's Soccer League, scoring 15 goals in 20 matches.

=== United Women's Soccer ===
The Rough Riders joined United Women's Soccer for the 2016 season after the USL W-League folded. The team went 4-3-3 (16 points) in its first season in UWS, finishing in third place in the Eastern Conference.

Long Island went 8-2-2 in 2017 en route to the UWS Eastern Conference title and berth in the UWS National Championship Semifinal. The Rough Riders, who scored a conference-best 35 goals during the regular season and tied for the second-best defense (10 goals allowed), lost on penalty kicks to eventual UWS champion Grand Rapids FC in the national semifinal.

Karim Diallo was named head coach on May 7, 2018. His first season in charge was up and down as the Rough Riders finished 5-3-2, just shy of qualifying for the playoffs. The team ended the season with three consecutive victories, including a 9-1 win over Worcester Smiles on July 7.

=== USL W League ===
The team joined the revived USL W League on January 31, 2022.

== Players ==
=== Notable former players ===
- (United States) Kim DeCesare
- (United States) Gina DiMartino
- (United States) Crystal Dunn
- (Republic of Ireland) Elaine O'Connor
- (Egypt) Salma Tarik
- (United States) Susan Weber
- (United States) Sara Whalen
- (United States) Shannon Sepe Keenan
- (United States) Kim Wyant

== Year-by-year ==
Year	League	Reg. season	Playoffs
1995	USL W-League	1st, Eastern	Champions
1996	USL W-League	2nd, Eastern	did not qualify
1997	USL W-League	1st, Eastern	Champions
1998	USL W-League W-1	3rd, Northern	Conference Final
1999	USL W-League W-1	2nd, Northern	Divisional Playoffs
2000	USL W-League W-1	2nd, Northeast	did not qualify
2001	USL W-League W-1	1st, Northern	Conference Finals
2002	USL W-League	1st, Northeast	Conference Finals
2003	USL W-League	2nd, Northeast	Divisional Finals
2004	USL W-League	2nd, Northeast	Conference Semifinals
2005	USL W-League	3rd, Northeast	Conference Semifinals
2006	USL W-League	4th, Northeast	Conference Semifinals
2007	USL W-League	6th, Northeast	did not qualify
2008	USL W-League	2nd, Northeast	Conference Semifinals
2009	USL W-League	5th, Northeast	did not qualify
2010	USL W-League	4th, Northeast	did not qualify
2011	USL W-League	1st, Northeast	Conference Semifinals
2012	USL W-League	1st, Northeast	Conference Semifinals
2013	USL W-League	3rd, Northeast	did not qualify
2014	USL W-League	5th, Northeast	did not qualify
2015	USL W-League	3rd, Northeast	did not qualify
2016	United Women's Soccer	3rd, East	did not qualify
2017	United Women's Soccer	2nd, East	National Semifinals
2018	United Women's Soccer	3rd, East	did not qualify
2019	United Women's Soccer	4th, East	Conference Semifinals
2020	United Women's Soccer	Season cancelled due to COVID-19 pandemic.	
2021	United Women's Soccer	10th, East	did not qualify
2022	USL W League	2nd, Metropolitan	National Quarterfinals
2023	USL W League	2nd, Metropolitan	Conference Semifinals
2024	USL W League	1st, Metropolitan	Conference Finals
2025	USL W League	1st, Metropolitan	Conference Semifinals
2026	USL W League	1st, Metropolitan	Conference Semifinals

== Stadia ==
- Mitchel Athletic Complex; Uniondale, New York (2022–present)
- Hofstra University Soccer Stadium; Hempstead, New York (2018–2021)
- Cy Donelly Stadium at St. Anthony's High School, South Huntington, New York 2008-17
- Michael Tully Field, New Hyde Park, New York 2007-08
