= Meredith Flaherty =

American soccer coach and former player

Personal information
- Place of birth: Oceanside, California
- Height: 5 ft 6 in (1.68 m)

Youth career
- 1990–1993: Vista High School

College career
Years	Team	Apps	(Gls)
1994–1997	Clemson Tigers	50	
1998	Florida Gators	26	

Meredith Flaherty (née McCullen) is an American soccer coach and former player. During her college career, she played for the Clemson Tigers and Florida Gators, winning a national championship with the latter in 1998.

== Early life ==
Born Meredith McCullen, she played soccer at Vista High School in California.

== Playing career ==
=== College ===
Wanting to attend college on the east coast, Flaherty committed to Clemson to play for the Tigers, receiving "hardly" any other scholarships from eastern universities. Flaherty started 16 of 18 matches for the Tigers in 1994, her freshman year. The following season, she was named the first-team All-ACC goalkeeper and was also named a second-team All-South region selection. In her junior season, she only played three games due to a hand injury, which caused her to redshirt the season. Her playing time diminished in her senior season at Clemson, when she played in 12 matches, starting eleven of them.

She graduated Clemson with a degree in psychology and married her college boyfriend, Colin Flaherty before deciding to attend the University of Florida for their graduate program in counseling. Though she attended Florida for academic reasons, she played one final season for the Gators as she had one year of NCAA eligibility remaining. She started in all 26 matches she played in, missing just the Gators' match against Hartford due to injuries sustained in a car accident. Flaherty had four saves in a 7–2 victory over Maryland. The Gators suffered their first loss of the 1998 season to North Carolina, dropping to 11–1 on the season after losing 2–1 to the Tar Heels. She set Florida school records in goals against average (GAA) in a career with 0.643, and season-long records in minutes played, games, starts, saves, wins, and shutouts; she recorded shutouts in all three of the Gators' SEC Tournament matches. Flaherty was named an All-American, as well as the NCAA Defensive MVP for the season.

In a markedly defensive game in the 1998 NCAA women's semifinal against Santa Clara, Flaherty recorded seven saves. The Gators defeated Santa Clara 1–0, snapping the Broncos' streak of 16 consecutive shutouts to set up a rematch against North Carolina for the national championship. Flaherty and the Gators then won the 1998 NCAA championship game, defeating North Carolina, 1–0. In the game, Flaherty saved ten shots from going in. On the win, she stated, "We knew going in we wanted to play North Carolina. We were kind of hoping for it. If you're going to be national champions, you have to beat the national champions."

Meredith Flaherty college statistics
Season	Team	GP	GS	Min.	SV	GA	GAA	SHO	W–L–T
1994	Clemson	18	16	1,460	91	17	1.05	4	–
1995	Clemson	20	20	1,710	77	16	0.84	7	–
1996	Clemson	Redshirt (redshirt)							
1997	Clemson	12	11	874	53	14	1.44	3	–
1998	Florida	26	26	1,959	67	14	0.64	10.53	20–1–0
Career		88	63	5,123	169	45	0.79	28.53	42–7–1
Statistics retrieved from floridagators.com

=== Professional ===
Though she initially had "no interest in pursuing soccer" beyond the 1998 NCAA finals, Flaherty played soccer professionally for the New York Power of the Women's United Soccer Association (WUSA). She was the first goalkeeper drafted in the 2002 WUSA draft.

She also played for the Hampton Roads Piranhas of the USL W-League, a semi-professional open league. She was selected to the league's All-League Team and was named the league's Goalkeeper of the Year in 2003. The Piranhas won the 2003 W-League championship game, with a 1–0 win over the Chicago Cobras.

=== National team ===
From 1996 to 2001, Flaherty was a U.S. national team pool member. In 1997, she was selected to the roster for their training camp and traveled with the U.S. team on their Nike tour.

== Coaching career ==
Flaherty was a volunteer assistant coach at Florida in 1999 and later, at LSU. From 2000 to 2003, she served as the director of coaching for the Manatee Soccer Club in Bradenton, Florida. She then had an eleven-year tenure as the director of coaching for the Rush Soccer Club, eight years of which came in Virginia and three in Texas. She also served as the coach of the Texas Rush Soccer Club.

In 2011, she joined the Sam Houston Bearkats' coaching staff as a volunteer coach. The following year, she was named an assistant coach for the team. She then returned to Florida as a volunteer coach in 2014.

In 2019, she was a co-author of an op-ed published in the New York Times, discussing women in coaching.

== See also ==
- NCAA Division I Women's Soccer Tournament Most Outstanding Player
