= Vancouver Whitecaps FC (women) =

Former women's soccer club in Vancouver, British Columbia

- 2003–2010 crest
- Founded: 2000; 26 years ago
- Dissolved: December 2012; 13 years ago
- Stadium: Swangard Stadium; Burnaby, British Columbia
- Owner: Vancouver Whitecaps FC
- League: USL W-League

The Vancouver Whitecaps FC women was a Canadian soccer club based in Vancouver, British Columbia that played in the USL W-League, the second tier of women's soccer in the United States and Canada. The team was formed in 2001 under the name Vancouver Breakers following a merger of the Vancouver Lady 86ers and Vancouver Angels. In 2003, they changed their name to the Whitecaps to match the men's team.

== History ==
=== Pre-formation ===
==== Vancouver Lady 86ers ====
In 2000, the Vancouver Lady 86ers played an exhibition season over the summer along with three other new Pacific Northwest teams: Portland Rain, Spokane Chill and the Seattle Sounders Select Women, with the four teams planning to join the USL W-League for the 2001 season.

==== Vancouver Angels ====
In 2000, the Vancouver Angels were established to play in the Women's Premier Soccer League. During the 2000 season, the Angels finished in fourth place in the eight team division.

=== Breakers years ===
The team played its first two USL W-League seasons as the "Vancouver Breakers".

In 2001, David Stadnyk, the owner of the Angels, purchased the Vancouver 86ers and merged the Angels with the Lady 86ers under the name Vancouver Breakers, while renaming the male 86ers to their former name Vancouver Whitecaps The team joined the USL W-League for the 2001 season.

In their debut season, they finished first in the Western Conference advancing to the playoffs. In the semi-finals, the Breakers needed a 104th minute overtime golden goal from Andrea Neil to advance on a 1–0 win over the host Hampton Road Piranhas. After a two-and-a-half hour thunderstorm delay that resulted in the cancellation of the 3rd place game, the championship final was played at the Virginia Beach Sportsplex. When the skies cleared, despite a goal from Vancouver’s Tammy Crawford, the Breakers were defeated 5-1 by the Boston Renegades.

In 2002, the Breakers had another strong season, losing only one match (in overtime) during the regular season. However, in the playoffs, they lost in the semi-finals to the Charlotte Lady Eagles on penalty kicks. After the 2002 season, following a complaint from the WUSA's Boston Breakers, the Whitecaps held a contest to determine a new club name.

=== Whitecaps years ===
In 2003, both the men's and women's teams were purchased by Greg Kerfoot and the Breakers were renamed as the Whitecaps to consolidate the men's, women's, and youth teams under a single name. The team won the 2004 and 2006 championships, and was runner-up in 2001 and 2010. Vancouver played in the Western Conference against the Colorado Force, Colorado Rush, LA Strikers, Pali Blues, Santa Clarita Blue Heat, Seattle Sounders Women and Victoria Highlanders Women.

In 2010, the Whitecaps played their home games at Swangard Stadium in the city of Burnaby, British Columbia, 11 kilometres (6.8 mi) east of Downtown Vancouver. In 2011, the women played each home game in a different city in British Columbia. The team's colours were blue and white.

The club announced that it will not field a team for the 2013 USL W-League season. They stated it was because many of the best players in Canada are going to play in the National Women's Soccer League, involving the United States Soccer Federation, Canadian Soccer Association, and Mexican Football Federation. The Whitecaps continued fielding an under-18 team, their girls elite program, in the 2013 Pacific Coast Soccer League.

In 2019, several former Whitecaps Women players published allegations of sexual abuse and misconduct from coaches at the club. The claims centered around behaviour by head coach Bob Birarda, who was fired in 2008 after an internal investigation, and Hubert Busby Jr., who coached the team from 2011 to 2012. Several supporters groups for the men's team organized protests and walk-outs during matches in April and May 2019 in support of an independent investigation into the allegations. At one protest in May, they were joined by visiting Portland Timbers fans.

In late 2021, MLS announced an independent investigation and review into the conduct of both coaches as well as the Whitecaps organization. The investigation found that the Whitecaps' response "was appropriate" and "adhered to all of the [internal] investigator's recommendations". A parallel investigation into Canada Soccer's actions found that the allegations of Birarda's behaviour with the under-20 team were "mishandled" by CSA.

=== REX Program ===
In 2015, in collarboration with BC Soccer and the Canadian Soccer Association, the Whitecaps launched the first Women's Regional EXCEL Centre (REX) in Western Canada, for top Canadian women soccer prospects.

=== Northern Super League ===
In December 2022, it was announced that the Vancouver Whitecaps would be an inaugural member of the planned Northern Super League (then known as Project 8), a then-upcoming fully-professional women's soccer league in Canada. It was later revealed that the team would play under the name Vancouver Rise FC. They played their inaugural game on April 27, 2025.

== Former head coaches ==
Head coaches
Years	Name	Ref
2001–2003	David Dew	
2004–2005	Chris Bennett	
2005	Patrick Rohla	
2006-2008	Bob Birarda	
2009	Alan Koch	
2010–2011	Hubert Busby, Jr.	
2012	Jesse Symons	

== Seasons ==
Season	League	Record	Rank	Playoffs	Ref
As Vancouver Breakers
2001	USL W-League	12–1–1	1st, West	Runners-Up	
2002	USL W-League	11–0–1	1st, West	3rd	
As Vancouver Whitecaps Women
2003	USL W-League	10–1–1	1st, West	Quarter-finals	
2004	USL W-League	13–1–0	1st, West	Champions	
2005	USL W-League	13–0–1	1st, West	3rd	
2006	USL W-League	11–1–0	1st, West	Champions	
2007	USL W-League	6–3–3	3rd, West	did not qualify	
2008	USL W-League	7–3–2	2nd, West	Quarter-finals	
2009	USL W-League	2–4–6	5th	did not qualify	
2010	USL W-League	6–4–0	1st, West	Runners-Up	
2011	USL W-League	8–4–2	2nd, West	3rd	
2012	USL W-League	3–6–5	6th, West	did not qualify	

== Top goalscorers ==
Top goalscorer
Year	Name	Goals	Ref
2001	Diana Artuso	10	
2002	Christine Sinclair	7	
2003	Phebe Trotman	13	
2004	Martina Franko	19	
2005	Amber Allen	16	
2006	Christine Sinclair	12	
2007	Tiffany Milbrett	11	
2008	Tiffany Milbrett	5	
2009	Jodi Ann Robinson	7	
2010	Melissa Tancredi	6	
2011	Sydney Leroux	12	
2012	Mele French	5	

== Awards and honours ==
- USL W-League Champions: 2004, 2006
- USL W-League Western Conference Champions: 2001, 2002, 2004, 2005, 2010, 2011
