= Hieke Zijlstra =

Dutch footballer (born 1981)

Personal information
- Full name: Hieke Zijlstra
- Date of birth: 12 August 1981 (age 45)
- Place of birth: Oldehove, Netherlands
- Position: Midfielder

Youth career
- CVV Viboa
- Velocitas

Senior career*
Years	Team	Apps	(Gls)
2001–2003	Oranje Nassau,		
2004	Chicago Cobras		
2004	Charlotte Lady Eagles		
2004–2006	Bristol Academy		
2006–2008	Be Quick '28		
- CVV Viboa

International career
2000–2003	Netherlands	10	(2)
- * Club domestic league appearances and goals as of 07:26, 15 December 2022 (UTC)

Hieke Zijlstra (born 12 August 1981) is a Dutch footballer. She played as a midfielder or striker for clubs in the Netherlands, the United States and England, and has represented the Netherlands national team.

== Club career ==
After starting her career in the Netherlands, Zijlstra moved to America in summer 2003. She played for the Chicago Cobras and Charlotte Lady Eagles, but rejected a scholarship in Florida to sign for English club Bristol Academy in August 2004.

Zijlstra returned to the Netherlands in 2006, where she continued to play.

== International career ==
Zijlstra made her debut for the Netherlands in a 3–2 win in Belgium on 4 October 2000. She scored two goals in 10 appearances, the last of which came against Nigeria on 10 June 2003.

She also went to the 2001 Summer Universiade in Beijing, playing three matches, scoring one goal and winning a silver medal.

=== International goals ===
Scores and results list the Netherlands goal tally first.

Goal	Date	Venue	Opponent	Score	Result	Competition
1.	20 March 2001	Gemeentelijk Stadion, Kontich, Belgium	Belgium	2–0	4–0	Friendly
2.	9 April 2001	Sportpark De Pas, Elst, Netherlands	Denmark	1–0	1–1	Friendly

== Personal life ==
Zijlstra is a devout Christian.
