= 1998 NCAA Division I women's soccer tournament =

1998 NCAA women's soccer tournament
Women's College Cup (semifinals & final)

Tournament details
- Country: United States
- Dates: November 11 – December 6, 1998
- Teams: 48

Final positions
- Champions: Florida Gators (1st title, 1st College Cup)
- Runners-up: North Carolina Tar Heels (16th title match, 17th College Cup)
- Semifinalists: Portland Pilots (4th College Cup); Santa Clara Broncos (6th College Cup)

Tournament statistics
- Matches played: 47
- Goals scored: 170 (3.62 per match)
- Attendance: 45,997 (979 per match)
- Top goal scorer(s): Meredith Florance, UNC (3)

Awards
- Best player: Danielle Fotopoulos, UF (Offensive); Meredith Flaherty, UF (Defensive)

The 1998 NCAA Division I women's soccer tournament (also known as the 1998 NCAA Women's College Cup) was the 17th annual single-elimination tournament to determine the national champion of NCAA Division I women's collegiate soccer. The semifinals and championship game were played again at the UNCG Soccer Stadium in Greensboro, North Carolina.

Florida defeated North Carolina in the final, 1–0, to win their first national title. Coached by Becky Burleigh, the Gators finished the season 26–1. Florida won the championship in their first appearance in the College Cup, a feat matched only by USC in 2007.

The Gators' roster won the tournament's awards for both most outstanding offensive player and most outstanding defensive player, awarded to Danielle Fotopoulos and Meredith Flaherty, respectively. Fotopoulos and Flaherty, along with ten other players, were named to the All-tournament team.

The tournament's leading scorer, with 3 goals, was Meredith Florance from North Carolina.

== Qualification ==
All Division I women's soccer programs were eligible to qualify for the tournament. The tournament field expanded again, this time increasing from 32 teams to 48.

=== Format ===
To accommodate the sixteen additional teams, an additional round was added to the tournament for the thirty-two lowest-seeded teams. The top sixteen teams, meanwhile, were given a bye into the Second Round.

== National seeds ==
The eight national seeds were announced on November 8.

1. North Carolina (finals)
2. Florida (champions)
3. Santa Clara (semifinals)
4. Notre Dame (quarterfinals)
5. Portland (semifinals)
6. Connecticut (quarterfinals)
7. Penn State (quarterfinals)
8. Dartmouth (quarterfinals)

=== Teams ===
North Carolina Regional
Seed	School	Conference	Berth Type	Record
1	North Carolina	ACC	Automatic	21–0
8	Dartmouth	Ivy League	Automatic	14–1–2
	Virginia	ACC	At-large	13–6–2
	William & Mary	CAA	Automatic	16–2–2
	Charlotte	Conference USA	Automatic	14–5–3
	Fairfield	MAAC	Automatic	18–1
	Georgia	SEC	At-large	13–5
	Maryland	ACC	At-large	10–10–1
	South Carolina	SEC	At-large	11–6–1
	UCF	Trans America	Automatic	12–7
	Wake Forest	ACC	At-large	13–6–1
	Wisconsin	Big Ten	At-large	10–7–2

Santa Clara Regional
Seed	School	Conference	Berth Type	Record
3	Santa Clara	West Coast	Automatic	19–0–1
6	Connecticut	Big East	At-large	19–1–2
	Hartford	America East	Automatic	16–4
	UCLA	Pac-10	Auto (shared)	17–3–1
	BYU	WAC	At-large	19–3
	California	Pac-10	Auto (shared)	13–7
	Central Conn. State	Northeast	Automatic	12–7
	Colgate	Patriot	Automatic	13–6
	Harvard	Ivy League	At-large	11–4–1
	Pacific	Big West	Automatic	14–2–3
	Stanford	Pac-10	At-large	11–6–2
	Syracuse	Big East	At-large	13–6–1

Portland Regional
Seed	School	Conference	Berth Type	Record
4	Notre Dame	Big East	Automatic	19–2–1
5	Portland	West Coast	At-large	16–2–2
	San Diego State	WAC	Automatic	18–2–1
	Nebraska	Big 12	Automatic	16–3–1
	Alabama	SEC	At-large	13–6–1
	Kentucky	SEC	At-large	09–8–3
	Michigan	Big Ten	At-large	13–6–1
	Minnesota	Big Ten	At-large	13–5–1
	Texas A&M	Big 12	At-large	13–7
	USC	Pac-10	Auto (shared)	13–6–1
	Washington	Pac-10	At-large	10–8–1
	Xavier	Atlantic 10	Automatic	12–6–2

Florida Regional
Seed	School	Conference	Berth Type	Record
2	Florida	SEC	Automatic	21–1
7	Penn State	Big Ten	Automatic	19–3–1
	Clemson	ACC	At-large	15–6
	Baylor	Big 12	At-large	15–4–1
	Evansville	Missouri Valley	Automatic	14–5–2
	Indiana	Big Ten	At-large	13–7–1
	James Madison	CAA	At-large	12–7–1
	Northwestern	Big Ten	At-large	14–4–1
	Radford	Big South	Automatic	11–7–2
	UNC Greensboro	Southern	Automatic	13–8–1
	Vanderbilt	SEC	At-large	16–5
	Wright State	Midwestern Collegiate	Automatic	08–10–2

== Bracket ==
First round Campus Sites
Charlotte	2
South Carolina	0
Maryland	4
Fairfield	3
Georgia	5
Wake Forest	2
Wisconsin	2
Central Florida	0
Minnesota	6
Kentucky	0
USC (2OT)	2
Washington	1
Texas A&M	3
Alabama	1
Michigan	4
Xavier	2
Pacific	2
California	1
BYU	6
Stanford	1
Harvard	4
C. Connecticut State	1
Syracuse	4
Colgate	1
Indiana	3
Wright State	1
Vanderbilt	5
UNC Greensboro	1
Northwestern (2OT)	2
Evansville	1
James Madison	4
Radford	0

Second round Campus Sites
1	North Carolina	6
Charlotte	0
William & Mary	2
Maryland	0
Virginia	2
Georgia (3–1 PK)	2
8	Dartmouth	1
Wisconsin	0
5	Portland	3
Minnesota	0
San Diego State (3OT)	1
USC	0
Nebraska	7
Texas A&M	0
4	Notre Dame	3
Michigan	0
3	Santa Clara	5
Pacific	0
UCLA	0
BYU	2
Hartford	3
Harvard	0
6	Connecticut	2
Syracuse	1
7	Penn State	2
Indiana	1
Clemson	2
Vanderbilt	0
Baylor	4
Northwestern	5
2	Florida	5
James Madison	1

Third Round; Campus Sites
1	North Carolina	3
William & Mary	0
Georgia	1
8	Dartmouth	2
5	Portland	5
San Diego State	0
Nebraska	1
4	Notre Dame	2
3	Santa Clara	3
BYU	0
Hartford	1
6	Connecticut	2
7	Penn State	1
Clemson	0
Northwestern	0
2	Florida	1

Quarterfinals; Campus Sites
1	North Carolina	3
8	Dartmouth	0
5	Portland	2
4	Notre Dame	1
3	Santa Clara	1
6	Connecticut	0
7	Penn State	1
2	Florida	3

Semifinals (Women's College Cup); UNCG Soccer Stadium; Greensboro, North Carolina
1	North Carolina (4OT)	1
5	Portland	0
3	Santa Clara	0
2	Florida	1

Championship (Women's College Cup); UNCG Soccer Stadium; Greensboro, North Carolina
1	North Carolina	0
2	Florida	1

== All-tournament team ==
- Keisha Bell, Florida
- Lorrie Fair, North Carolina
- Meredith Flaherty, Florida (most outstanding defensive player)
- Meredith Florance, North Carolina
- Michelle French, Portland
- Danielle Fotopoulos, Florida (most outstanding offensive player)
- Angela Harrison, Portland
- Heather Mitts, Florida
- Cindy Parlow, North Carolina
- Tiffany Roberts, North Carolina
- Laurie Schwoy, North Carolina
- Nikki Serlenga, Santa Clara

== See also ==
- 1998 NCAA Division I men's soccer tournament
- 1998 NCAA Division II women's soccer tournament
- 1998 NCAA Division III women's soccer tournament
- 1998 NAIA women's soccer tournament
