= Caitlin Fisher =

Caitlin Fisher may refer to:

- Caitlin Fisher (artist)
- Caitlin Fisher (soccer)
