= Darci Borski =

American soccer player

Personal information
- Date of birth: March 24, 1980 (age 46)
- Place of birth: Philadelphia, Pennsylvania, United States
- Height: 5 ft 3 in (1.60 m)
- Position: Forward

College career
Years	Team	Apps	(Gls)
1998–2002	Virginia Cavaliers		(30)

Senior career*
Years	Team	Apps	(Gls)
2003	Washington Freedom		
2003	Philadelphia Charge		
2004	Asker Fotball		

International career
- United States U16
- United States U17
- * Club domestic league appearances and goals

Darci Borski is a retired American soccer player who played in the Women's United Soccer Association (WUSA).

== Early life and education ==
Borski is the daughter of former US Congressman Robert Borski.

She grew up in Philadelphia and attended Nazareth Academy High School, where she played for the girls' soccer team. During the high school career, she scored 100 goals and numerous state and national honors, including being named the Catholic Academies League most valuable player four times, as well as the Pennsylvania's Gatorade State Player of the Year. After her graduation, the school retired her number 10 jersey.

After high school, she attended the University of Virginia, where she earned a Bachelor of Arts in religious studies. She later earned a master's in elementary education from Chestnut Hill College.

== Career ==
=== Athletic career ===
Before graduating from high school, Borski participated in the EPYSA Olympic Development Program and competed on the United States women's national under-16 and under-17 soccer teams for four years.

While studying at the University of Virginia, Borski played for the school's soccer team, where she "earned All-American, All-Tournament and Second Team All-ACC honors."

In 2002, Borski made her professional debut playing for the Philadelphia Charge. The following year, she was drafted in WUSA's third round to play for the Washington Freedom, though WUSA folded later that year. She also played professionally with Asker Fotball in Norway, as well as for the Hampton Roads Piranhas in the USL W-League.

=== Coaching ===
After completing her professional athletic career, Borski took on jobs coaching women's soccer teams, including at Germantown Academy (2005–2011) and William Penn Charter School, where she was also the school's associate athletic director. In 2007, she was named the Southeastern Pennsylvania (SEPA) Coach of the Year, followed by the SEPA Hall of Fame Coach of the Year and Times Herald Coach of the Year in 2008. Under her guidance, the Germantown Academy team was ranked 13th in the nation by ESPN and named the 2008 Philadelphia Inquirer Team of the Year. The following year, she was yet again named the Times Herald Coach of the Year.

== Honors ==
In 2015, Borski was inducted into the Southeastern Pennsylvania Soccer Hall of Fame.
