= Arizona Heatwave =

- Full name: Arizona Heatwave
- Nickname: Heatwave
- Founded: 2001
- Stadium: Sandra Day O'Connor HS Stadium
- Managing partner: Tom McConkey
- General manager: Rick Kelsey
- Head coach: Manny Arias
- League: USL W-League
- 2005: 2nd, Western Conference; Conference finals
Home colours	Away colours

The Arizona Heatwave were an American women's soccer team founded in 2003, which played in the USL W-League for three years until 2005, when they left the league and the franchise was terminated.

The Heatwave played their home games in the stadium at Sandra Day O'Connor High School in the city of Glendale, Arizona.

== Colors and crest ==
The team was affiliated with Arizona Futbol Club and shared its crest, which were the letters AZ over crossed hammers on a blue and green heater shield. The team's colors were green, blue, and white.

== Final squad ==
vs. Denver Lady Cougars, July 15, 2005

Note: Flags indicate national team as defined under FIFA eligibility rules; some limited exceptions apply. Players may hold more than one non-FIFA nationality.

No.	Pos.	Nation	Player
1	GK	USA	Jennifer Branam
3	DF	USA	Amy LePeilbet
5	MF	USA	Christie Spear
6	DF	USA	Julie Willford
8	FW	USA	Stephanie Peel
9	FW	USA	Brittany Cooper
11	FW	USA	Liz Bogus
12	GK	MEX	Pamela Tajonar

No.	Pos.	Nation	Player
13	DF	USA	Shaye Harrell
15	MF	USA	Mallory Miller
16	MF	MEX	Mónica Vergara
21	DF	USA	Michelle Deatherage
23	MF	USA	Jennifer Klein
24	MF	MEX	Luz Saucedo
26	MF	USA	Patrice Faulner

== Year-by-year ==
Year	Division	League	Reg. season	Playoffs
2001	2	USL W-League	6th, Western	
2002	2	USL W-League	3rd, Western	
2003	2	USL W-League	4th, Western	
2004	1	USL W-League	4th, Western	
2005	1	USL W-League	2nd, Western	Conference Finals

== Coaches ==
- 2004: (United States) Kim Byrnes
- 2005: (United States) Manny Arias

== Stadia ==
- Stadium at Dobson High School, Mesa, Arizona 2003
- Stadium at Scottsdale Community College, Scottsdale, Arizona 2004
- Mesa Sports Complex, Mesa, Arizona 2004 (1 game)
- Stadium at Sandra Day O'Connor High School, Glendale, Arizona 2005
