= Lehigh Valley Cougars =

The Lehigh Valley Cougars were a W-League women's soccer club based in Allentown, Pennsylvania. The team disbanded after the 1996 season.

== Year-by-year ==
| Year | Division | League | Reg. season | Playoffs |
|---|---|---|---|---|
| 1996 | 1 | USL W-League | 11th, East | |
