= Caitlin Fisher (soccer) =

American academic and former professional soccer player

Personal information
- Full name: Caitlin Davis Fisher
- Date of birth: July 26, 1982 (age 44)
- Position: Defender

College career
| Years | Team | Apps | (Gls) |
| 2001–2004 | Harvard Crimson | | |

Senior career*
| Years | Team | Apps | (Gls) |
| 2002–2006 | Boston Renegades | | |
| 2004 | Santos | | |
| 2006 | Hammarby | | |
| 2007 | New York Athletic Club | 3 | (0) |
| 2009 | Chicago Red Stars | 0 | (0) |
| 2011 | Millwall Lionesses | 3 | (0) |
| 2012 | Vitória das Tabocas | | |

International career
- United States under-21
- * Club domestic league appearances and goals

Caitlin Davis Fisher (born July 26, 1982) is an American academic and former professional soccer player.

== Soccer career ==
Fisher played college soccer for Harvard Crimson, captaining the team, being named to the All-Ivy League first team in 2001 and 2002, and earning a call-up to the United States women's national under-21 soccer team during her sophomore year.

She played for the Boston Renegades of the USL W-League from 2002 through 2006. In late 2004 she travelled to Brazil, where she lodged with team coach Kleiton Lima while playing for Santos FC in the Campeonato Paulista de Futebol Feminino.

During the 2006 Damallsvenskan season, Fisher played for Hammarby, making 14 appearances in total for the Swedish club. She played three games for New York Athletic Club in the 2007 WPSL season. When Women's Professional Soccer was being put together, Fisher was attached to Boston Breakers. However she was waived in pre-season. Later in the 2009 season Fisher was given a development contract with Chicago Red Stars and called up to the main roster from their affiliate Chicago Red Eleven, only to be waived shortly afterwards.

While studying at the London School of Economics, Fisher was attached to Chelsea and Millwall Lionesses. She made three appearances for Millwall in the 2010–11 FA Women's Premier League. In early 2012 she returned to Brazil, to sign for Associação Acadêmica e Desportiva Vitória das Tabocas ahead of their Campeonato Pernambucano de Futebol Feminino campaign.

== Guerreiras Project ==
In 2010 Fisher and Aline Pellegrino founded the Guerreiras (transl. female warrior) Project, to counter sexism in women's football in Brazil.

== Personal life ==
Fisher identifies as queer.
