= Gulf Coast Chaos =

The Gulf Coast Chaos were a W-League club based in Ocean Springs, Mississippi. The team folded after the 1997 season

== Year-by-year ==
Year	Division	League	Reg. season	Playoffs
1997	1	USL W-League	6th, South	
