= Katie Bethke =

American soccer player (born 1988)

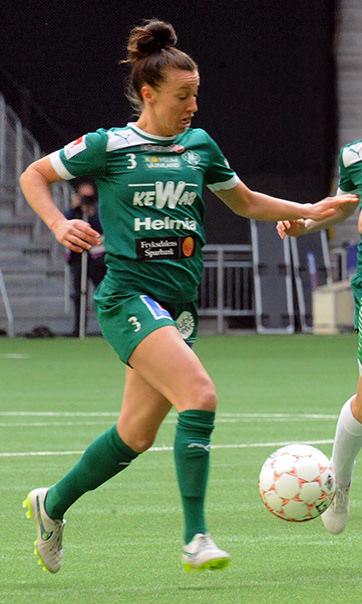

Personal information
- Full name: Katelyn O'Hern Bethke
- Date of birth: September 3, 1988 (age 38)
- Place of birth: Eau Claire, Wisconsin, United States
- Height: 5 ft 7 in (1.70 m)
- Position: Forward

College career
Years	Team	Apps	(Gls)
2007–2010	Minnesota Golden Gophers		

Senior career*
Years	Team	Apps	(Gls)
2008	Boston Renegades		
2009–2010	Ottawa Fury		
2011	Atlanta Beat	4	(0)
2011	Arna-Bjørnar	12	(6)
2012	Bayer 04 Leverkusen	7	(2)
2013–2014	Avaldsnes IL	33	(5)
2014	IK Grand Bodø	10	(1)
2015	Mallbackens IF	7	(0)
2015	Eskilstuna United DFF	5	(0)

International career^{‡}
2010–2011	United States U23	5	(0)
- * Club domestic league appearances and goals as of 21:44, 16 February 2016 (UTC) ‡ National team caps and goals as of 15:05, May 10, 2012 (UTC)

Katelyn O'Hern Bethke (born September 3, 1988) is a retired American soccer player who last represented Swedish Damallsvenskan club Eskilstuna United DFF, having previously played for Mallbackens IF.

== Club career ==
Bethke played for Atlanta Beat in the WPS in 2011. On July 24, 2011, Bethke signed a deal with Norwegian Toppserien club Arna-Bjørnar.

On January 19, 2012, Bethke joined German Bundesliga side Bayer 04 Leverkusen where she played 7 of the remaining season matches.

Bethke signed a contract with Avaldsnes IL in the Toppserien in January 2013.

For the 2015 season she moved to Sweden and played in the Damallsvenskan, firstly for Mallbackens IF and in July she signed with Eskilstuna United DFF. On 1 September 2015, it was announced by Eskilstuna United that Bethke requested the termination of her contract, as she decided to retired from football.

== International career ==
Bethke was part of the United States U23 squad for the 2011 Four Nations Tournament.

== Illinois Intramural Career ==
Currently playing for Learned Foot at the University of Illinois.
