= Central Florida Krush =

The Central Florida Krush was a W-League franchise based in Winter Park, Florida. The team played at Showalter Field, which they shared with the Premier Development League club, Central Florida Kraze. The team folded after the 2006 season.

== Year-by-year ==
Year	Division	League	Reg. season	Playoffs
2005	1	USL W-League	2nd, Atlantic	National Semifinals (4th Place)
2006	1	USL W-League	4th, Atlantic	Did not qualify

== Honors ==
- USL W-League Central Conference Champions 2005

== Notable former players ==
- (United States) Heather Mitts
