= Keisha Bell =

American soccer player (born 1979)

Personal information
- Full name: Keisha Bell Sowell
- Birth name: Keisha Bell
- Date of birth: December 20, 1979 (age 46)
- Place of birth: Spring, Texas, U.S.
- Height: 5 ft 9 in (1.75 m)
- Position: Defender

Youth career
- –1997: Klein Oak Panthers

College career
Years	Team	Apps	(Gls)
1998–2001	Florida Gators	95	(4)

International career
2001	United States	2	(0)

Managerial career
- 2003: Florida Gators (volunteer coach)

Keisha Bell Sowell (née Bell; born December 20, 1979) is an American former soccer player who was a defender for the United States women's national soccer team.

== Career ==
Bell helped win the NCAA championship with the University of Florida in 1998 as a freshman and earned recognition on the NCAA's all-tournament team. She later served as a volunteer coach for the team in 2003.

== Personal life ==
Bell is married to Ronnie Sowell. She works as a teacher at Woodcreek Middle School in Houston, and has four children.

== International career statistics ==
Nation	Year	International Appearances				
Nation	Year	Apps	Starts	Minutes	Goals	Assists
United States	2001	10	1	463	0	0
Career Total	1	10	1	463	0	0
