= Amber Allen =

Canadian soccer player

Personal information
- Full name: Amber Allen
- Date of birth: October 21, 1975 (age 51)
- Place of birth: Chilliwack, British Columbia, Canada
- Height: 1.73 m (5 ft 8 in)
- Position: Forward

Youth career
- McGill University

Senior career*
Years	Team	Apps	(Gls)
2001–2006	Vancouver Whitecaps	66	(41)

International career^{‡}
2002–2008	Canada	25	(6)
- * Club domestic league appearances and goals as of 11:57, August 2, 2013 (UTC) ‡ National team caps and goals as of 11:57, August 2, 2013 (UTC)

Amber Allen (born October 21, 1975) is a Canadian professional soccer player. She led the Vancouver Whitecaps team in goals (23) and points (48) in the 2005. This earned her the W-League All-Conference honours. She was named for the national squad for the 2008 Olympics, but had to drop out due to a leg injury.
