= Real Colorado =

Soccer club in Douglas County, Colorado

- Full name: Real Colorado Soccer Club
- Nicknames: Foxes (men's); Cougars (women's)
- Founded: 1986 (40 years ago)
- Ground: Real Colorado Soccer Complex; Meridian, Colorado
- Owner: Sean Henning
- Chairman: Ron vonLembke
- League: USL League Two (men's); USL W League (women's)
- 2025: The League for Clubs (men's); Mountain Premier, 4th of 4; Playoffs: Conference semi-finals
- Website: realcolorado.net
Home colors

Real Colorado is an amateur soccer club based in Meridian, Colorado, in the Denver metropolitan area. It was founded in 1986, and primarily serves as a youth soccer club. It currently fields senior men's and women's teams in USL League Two and the USL W League, both in the amateur fourth tier of the United States league system.

The club originally fielded senior teams in the original incarnation of the W League in the 2000 season, and the Premier Development League (now USL League Two) in the 2009 season. Both teams were folded in 2010 and 2015, respectively. The senior men's team was re-established in 2025, competing in the Mountain Premier conference of The League for Clubs, before moving to USL League Two for the 2026 season, while the senior women's team was re-established for the 2026 season.

== History ==
Real Colorado first fielded a senior women's team, the Cougars, into the original USL W-League in 2000. The Cougars were a member of the Western Conference, and played against the Colorado Force, Los Angeles Strikers, Pali Blues, Santa Clarita Blue Heat, Seattle Sounders Select Women, Vancouver Whitecaps, and Victoria Highlanders Women. They were founded as the "Colorado Gold", before rebranding as the "Denver Lady Cougars" in 2001, and finally the Real Colorado Cougars in 2006. The Cougars were folded after the 2010 season, with the Colorado Rush Women taking their place.

Real Colorado Foxes logo, 2011–15

Real Colorado first fielded the Foxes, a senior men's team into the Premier Development League (now USL League Two) in 2009. The Foxes played their first ever game on May 9, 2009, against Kansas City Brass, and won the game 3–2, with the first goal in franchise history being scored by Chris Salvaggione. In 2011, the Foxes qualified for the U.S. Open Cup by winning the first 4 games of the regular season. The Foxes then advanced to the second round by knocking out the DV8 Defenders with a 5–0 victory, but fell short to Kitsap Pumas in the following round, by a score of 3–1. The Foxes' average attendance was 114 in 2009, 80 in 2010, 191 in 2011, 268 in 2012, and 165 in 2013. (Note: Attendance stats are calculated by averaging each team's self-reported home attendances from the historical match archive.)

== Stadiums ==
- Real Colorado Soccer Complex (2026 - )
- Shea Stadium; Highlands Ranch, Colorado (2009–2015)
- Stadium at Englewood High School; Englewood, Colorado 1 game (2010)
- Heritage Stadium; Highlands Ranch, Colorado 2 games (2010, 2015)
- Washburn Field at Colorado College; Colorado Springs, Colorado 1 game (2011)
- CSM Soccer Stadium at Colorado School of Mines; Golden, Colorado 2 games (2012)

== Team ==
=== Notable former players ===
This list of notable former players comprises players who went on to play professional soccer after playing for the team in the Premier Development League, or those who previously played professionally before joining the team.

- (Canada) Tesho Akindele
- (Gibraltar) Joseph Chipolina
- (United States) Chris Salvaggione
- (United States) Brad Stisser
- (United States) Joe Willis
- (United States) Cody Stratton
- (United States) Taylor Kemp

=== Head coaches ===
Foxes

- (United States) Lorne Donaldson (2009–2010, 2012–2013)
- (England) Leigh Davies (2011–2012)
- (United States) Stoner Tadlock (2013–present)

== Seasons ==
List of Real Colorado senior women's seasons
Season	League	Pld	W	D	L	GF	GA	GD	Pos	Playoffs
2000	USL-W2	12	7	4	1	33	18	+15	2nd	DNQ
2001	USL-W2	10	5	0	5	28	18	+10	3rd	DNQ
2002	USL-W	12	10	2	0	32	14	+18	2nd	Semi-finals
2003	USL-W	12	6	4	2	36	24	+12	3rd	DNQ
2004	USL-W	14	6	7	1	24	25	–1	5th	DNQ
2005	USL-W	14	7	6	1	26	24	+2	4th	DNQ
2006	USL-W	12	3	4	5	25	27	–2	4th	DNQ
2007	USL-W	12	3	7	2	11	18	–7	6th	DNQ
2008	USL-W	12	5	4	3	15	19	–4	4th	DNQ
2009	USL-W	12	4	5	3	16	15	+1	3rd	DNQ
2026	USLW	10	9	0	1	49	1	+48	2nd	DNQ

List of Real Colorado senior men's seasons
Season	League	Pld	W	D	L	GF	GA	GD	Pos	Playoffs	USOC
2009	PDL	16	8	3	5	28	19	+9	3rd	Divisional finals	DNQ
2010	PDL	16	7	6	3	26	18	+8	3rd	DNQ	DNQ
2011	PDL	16	11	3	2	49	23	+26	3rd	DNQ	Second round
2012	PDL	16	8	4	4	19	19	+0	2nd	Conference semi-finals	First round
2013	PDL	14	9	2	3	28	14	+14	2nd	Conference semi-finals	First round
2014	PDL	14	2	4	8	12	18	–6	5th	DNQ	Second round
2015	PDL	15	5	5	4	20	21	–1	4th	DNQ	DNQ
2025	TLfC	6	0	1	5	7	15	–8	4th	Conference semi-finals	DNQ
2026	USL2	12	4	2	6	24	31	–7	4th	DNQ	DNQ
