= Columbus Lady Shooting Stars =

Women's soccer club based in Ohio, US

The Columbus Lady Shooting Stars were a W-League club based in Columbus, Ohio, US, associated with former the Men's USL team, the Columbus Shooting Stars. The team played in the Midwest Division of the Central Conference, and folded after the 2004 season.

== Year-by-year ==
Year	Division	League	Reg. season	Playoffs	Average attendance	Notes
2003	2	USL W-League	3rd, Midwest		276	
2004	1	USL W-League	10th, Midwest			folded before season began
