= Calgary Wildfire =

Canadian soccer club

Calgary Wildfire were a W-League club based in Calgary, Alberta, Canada.

The club was officially formed in 2004 with Glenn Ramsay as general manager and Lisa Unsworth as head coach. They played at Calgary Rugby Park.

== Year-by-year ==
Year	Division	League	Reg. season	Playoffs
2004	1	USL W-League	7th, Western	
