= New Jersey Lady Stallions =

New Jersey Lady Stallions were a USL W-League club based in Wayne, New Jersey, associated with the former Men's USL team, the New Jersey Stallions. The team folded after the 2004 season.

== Year-by-year ==
Year	Division	League	Reg. season	Playoffs
2003	2	USL W-League	1st, Northeast	
2004	1	USL W-League	3rd, Northeast	

== Honors ==
- USL W-League Northeast Division Champions 2003

== Notable former players ==
- (United States) Yael Averbuch
- (United States) Sheree Gray
- (United States) Nikki Krzysik
- (United States) Christie Rampone
- (England) Kelly Smith
