= Windy City Bluez =

Former W-league club

The Windy City Bluez were an American women's soccer club which played in the W-League. Based in Palos Hills, Illinois, the team folded after the 2004 season.

== Year-by-year ==
Year	Division	League	Reg. season	Playoffs
2003	2	USL W-League	5th, Midwest	
2004	1	USL W-League	6th, Midwest	
