= Rhode Island Lady Stingrays =

The Rhode Island Lady Stingrays were a W-League club based in Providence, Rhode Island, USA, associated with the Men's USL team, the Rhode Island Stingrays. The team folded after the 2004 season.

== Year-by-year ==
Year	Division	League	Reg. season	Playoffs
2004	1	USL W-League	4th, New England	
