= Mile High Edge =

Mile High Edge were a W-League club based in Denver, Colorado, USA. Until 2005 the team was known as the Mile High Mustangs. The team folded after the 2007 season.

== Year-by-year ==
Year	Division	League	Reg. season	Playoffs
2003	2	USL W-League	6th, Western	
2004	1	USL W-League	6th, Western	
2005	1	USL W-League	3rd, Western	
2006	1	USL W-League	3rd, Western	Conference Finals
2007	1	USL W-League	5th, Western	Did not qualify
