= Hampton Roads Piranhas =

- Full name: Hampton Roads Piranhas
- Nickname: The Piranhas
- Founded: 1995
- Dissolved: 2014
- Stadium: Virginia Beach Sportsplex
- Capacity: 10,780
- League: USL W-League
- 2008: 4th, Atlantic Division
Home colours	Away colours

Hampton Roads Piranhas was an American women's soccer team, founded in 1995. The team was a member of the United Soccer Leagues W-League, the second tier of women's soccer in the United States and Canada. The team played in the Atlantic Division of the Eastern Conference against the Atlanta Silverbacks Women, Charlotte Lady Eagles, Dayton Dutch Lions FC, Fredericksburg Impact, Northern Virginia Majestics.

The team played its home games at the Virginia Beach Sportsplex in the city of Virginia Beach, Virginia. The team's colors are red and white.

The team was a sister organization of the men's Hampton Roads Piranhas team, which played in the USL Premier Development League.

The team announced on January 15, 2014 that both the PDL and W-League teams will be folding and will not play in the 2014 season. The primary owners health was cited as the reason behind the decision.

== Players ==
=== Notable former players ===
- (Brazil) Daniela
- (Australia) Kelly Golebiowski
- (United States) Angela Hucles
- (United States) Kelly Sisley
- (United States) Lori Lindsey
- (United States) Sandy McQuerry
- (United States) Carrie Proost
- (Australia) Amy Taylor
- (United States) Christie Welsh
- (United States) Kalin Rosales
- (Nigeria) Mercy Akide
- (Nigeria) Florence Omagbemi

== Year-by-year ==
Year	Division	League	Reg. season	Playoffs
2003	2	USL W-League	1st, Atlantic	Champions
2004	1	USL W-League	1st, Atlantic	
2005	1	USL W-League	4th, Atlantic	Did not qualify
2006	1	USL W-League	6th, Atlantic	Did not qualify
2007	1	USL W-League	5th, Atlantic	Did not qualify
2008	1	USL W-League	4th, Atlantic	Did not qualify

== Honors ==
- USL W-League Atlantic Division Champions 2004
- USL W-League Atlantic Division Champions 2003

== Coaches ==
- (United States) Joanie Murphy (1995)
- (United States) Patrick McStay (1996-1998)
- (United States) Terry Kelly and (United States) Sandy McQuerry (1999)
- (United States) Ken Johnson (soccer) (2000)
- (United States) John Germanos (2001–2003)
- (United States) Jeffrey Bowers (2004–2005)
- (Nigeria) Anthony Nweke (2006–2007)
- (United States) Wendy Kotwas Waddell (2008–present)

== Stadia ==
- Lake Taylor High School Stadium 1995-1997
- Great Neck Middle School Stadium 1998–1999
- Frank W. Cox High School Stadium 1995, 1999
- Virginia Beach Sportsplex 2000–2002, 2006
- Landstown High School Stadium 2003
- The Trinder Center/Foster Field at Virginia Wesleyan College 2004–2005, 2008

== Average attendance ==
- 1995: 572
- 1996: 502
- 1997: 532
- 1998: 617
- 1999: 955
- 2000: 835
- 2001: 793
- 2002: 841
- 2003: 698
- 2004: 705
- 2005: 1,023
- 2006:
- All-Time:

== See also ==
- Hampton Roads Piranhas (PDL)
