= South Jersey Banshees =

The South Jersey Banshees were a W-League soccer club based in a variety of locations around Southern New Jersey. They played six seasons before the club ceased operations after the 2006 season.

== Year-by-year ==
Year	Division	League	Reg. season	Playoffs
2001	2	USL W-League (W-2)	2nd, Eastern Conf.	Conf Final
2002	2	USL W-League	6th, Northeast	N/A
2003	2	USL W-League	5th, Northeast	N/A
2004	2	USL W-League	5th, Northeast	N/A
2005	2	USL W-League	7th, Northeast	N/A
2006	2	USL W-League	7th, Northeast	N/A

=== Notable former players ===
- (United States) Carli Lloyd (2001)

== Head coaches ==
- (England) Wayne Grocott (2001)
- (England) David Jones (2002)
- (United States) George Dunbar (2003–06)

== Stadia ==
2001
Cherokee High School; Marlton, New Jersey
Carey Stadium; Ocean City, New Jersey(1 game)

2002
Carey Stadium; Ocean City, New Jersey
Rugers-Camden Community Park; Camden, New Jersey

2003
Rutgers-Camden Community Park; Camden, New Jersey

2004
Winslow Stadium; Winslow, New Jersey
Rugers-Camden Community Park; Camden, New Jersey (1 game)
DePaul Catholic High School; Wayne, New Jersey (1 game)

2005
Winslow Stadium; Winslow, New Jersey

2006
Winslow Stadium; Winslow, New Jersey
Carey Stadium; Ocean City, New Jersey (1 game)

== See also ==
- Ocean City Barons
- W-League
