= Charlotte Eagles (women) =

American women's soccer team

- Founded: 2000
- Stadium: Sportsplex at Matthews; Matthews, North Carolina
- Capacity: 5,000
- Chairman: (United States) Pat Stewart
- Head coach: (United States) Sam Hope
- League: USL W League
Home colors	Away colors

Former logo of the Charlotte Lady Eagles.

The Charlotte Eagles (formerly the Charlotte Lady Eagles) is an American women's soccer club that plays in the USL W League. Owned by Missionary Athletes International (MAI), it is a sister club to the namesake men's team, and the Southern California Seahorses. The team plays its home games at the Sportsplex at Matthews in Matthews, North Carolina, alternating between an auxiliary field and the stadium depending on demand. The club's colors are orange, sky blue and white.

Between 2002 and 2015 the Lady Eagles were a member of the United Soccer Leagues USL W-League, the second tier of women's soccer in the United States and Canada, and a member of the W-2 League between 2000 and 2002. While the W-League folded in 2015, MAI continued training women and girls as players and coaches. After three years playing an independent schedule, the Lady Eagles joined the Women's Premier Soccer League for the 2019 season.

== Players ==
=== Current roster 2019 ===
Note: Flags indicate national team as defined under FIFA eligibility rules; some limited exceptions apply. Players may hold more than one non-FIFA nationality.

No.	Pos.	Nation	Player
00	GK	USA	Sami Sample
1	GK	USA	Katie Moore
5	DF	USA	Miranda Carrasco
8	MF	USA	Melanie Maddox
9	FW	USA	Alisha Holcombe
10	FW	ESP	Judith Sainz
11	MF	USA	Kimber Haley
13	MF	USA	Carrie Lewis
16	FW	USA	Makena Silber
17	FW	USA	Maddi Berthoud
18	DF	USA	Maddie McCarty
19	FW	USA	Skyler Prillaman

No.	Pos.	Nation	Player
20	MF	USA	Abby Ott
21	DF	USA	Leah Hoffman
22	MF	USA	Allie Hess
23	FW	USA	Makayla Walder
24	DF	USA	Audrey Ann Beck
25	DF	USA	Meredith Hamby
26	FW	USA	Jade Montgomery
27	GK	USA	Lauryn Harding
28	DF	USA	Keely Cartrett
30	DF	USA	Morgan Leyble
31	MF	CAN	Ellie Warren

=== Notable former players ===
- (United States) Abby Crumpton
- (United States) Keeley Dowling
- (United States) Kelly Schmedes
- (United States) Lydia Vandenbergh
- (Netherlands) Annemieke Griffioen
- (Netherlands) Hieke Zijlstra
- (United States) Ashleigh Gunning
- (Brazil) Leah Fortune

== Head coaches ==
- (United States) Lee Horton (2000–2015)
- (United States) Mitch Sanford (2015–2018)
- (United States) Sam Hope (2018–present)

== Year-by-year ==
Year	League	Reg. season	Playoffs
2000	USL W-League W-2	1st, Atlantic	Runner Up
2001	USL W-League W-2	1st, Eastern	W-2 Champions
2002	USL W-League	1st, Atlantic	Conference Finals
2003	USL W-League	2nd, Atlantic	Conference Finals
2004	USL W-League	2nd, Atlantic	Conference Finals
2005	USL W-League	1st, Atlantic	Conference Finals
2006	USL W-League	1st, Atlantic	National Semifinals (4th Place)
2007	USL W-League	3rd, Atlantic	did not qualify
2008	USL W-League	2nd, Atlantic	Conference Semifinals
2009	USL W-League	3rd, Atlantic	Conference Finals
2010	USL W-League	2nd, Atlantic	Conference Finals
2011	USL W-League	2nd, Atlantic	Conference Finals
2012	USL W-League	1st, Southeast	Conference Finals
2013	USL W-League	4th, Southeast	did not qualify
2014	USL W-League	2nd, Southeast	National Semifinals
2015	USL W-League	2nd, Southeast	did not qualify
2016	Did not field a team Academy program only		
2017	Did not field a team Academy program only		
2018	Did not field a team Academy program only		
2019	WPSL	1st, Carolinas South	Regional Final
2020	WPSL	Season cancelled due to COVID-19 pandemic	
2021	WPSL	1st, Carolinas South	Regional Semifinals
2022	WPSL	1st, Carolinas South	Regional Semifinals
2023	WPSL	2nd, Southeast South	WPSL Champions
2024	WPSL	1st, Carolina Division	Runners up
2025	USL W League	3rd, South Atlantic Division	did not qualify
2026	USL W League	1st, South Atlantic Division	Conference Semi-finals

== Honors ==
- Women's Premier Soccer League
  - WPSL Champions 2023
  - Carolinas Conference Champions 2019, 2024
  - Carolinas Conference South Division Champions 2019, 2021, 2022
  - South Region 2024
  - South Region Southeast Conference 2023
- USL W-League
  - Southeastern Conference Champions 2014
  - Central Conference Champions (2) 2002, 2006
  - Southeastern Division Champions 2012
  - Atlantic Division Champions (3) 2002, 2005, 2006
- USL W-2 League
  - League Champions 2001
  - Eastern Conference Champions 2001
  - Atlantic Conference Champions 2000
- Carolinas Cup
  - Champions 2021
