= Toronto Inferno =

The Toronto Inferno were a W-League professional women's soccer club based in Toronto, Ontario, Canada. The team folded after the 2004 season.

== Year-by-year ==
Year	Division	League	Reg. season	Playoffs
2003	2	USL W-League	3rd, Northern	
2004	1	USL W-League	4th, North Central	

== Notable players ==
- (Canada) Melanie Booth
