= Cincinnati Ladyhawks =

Soccer club in Ohio, US

- Full name: Cincinnati Ladyhawks
- Nickname: Ladyhawks
- Founded: 2000
- Stadium: Lakota West High School Soccer Stadium
- Capacity: 1,500
- League: W-League

The Cincinnati Ladyhawks was a soccer club based in Cincinnati, Ohio, that played in the W-League. The team was founded in 1999 by Tom Westfall and Dr. Stephen Dailey and stated play in 2000 as the sister franchise to then Cincinnati men's soccer franchise, the Cincinnati Riverhawks. The team originally played in the W-2 League. When the Riverhawks folded in 2003 the Ladyhawks were expected to fold as well but they didn't. Beginning in 2003, the team moved their games to Lakota West High School's soccer stadium as well as moving into the newly formed W-League (basically the W2 league with a few differences) which replaced the WUSA (who suspended operations that year) as the top level of women's soccer in the US. Following the 2006 season the team suspended operations.

== Year-by-year ==
Year	Division	League	Reg. season	Playoffs
2003	2	USL W-League	4th, Midwest	
2004	1	USL W-League	5th, Midwest	
2005	1	USL W-League	4th, Midwest	
2006	1	USL W-League	5th, Midwest	
