= Chicago Cobras =

Women's semi-professional soccer team

- Full name: Chicago Cobras
- Founded: 1996
- Dissolved: 2004
- Stadium: Forest View Park, Arlington Heights, Illinois
- Capacity: 4,000
- Owner: Terry McKay
- Head coach: Greg Muhr
- League: USL W-League
- Website: www.chicagocobras.com/

The Chicago Cobras were a USL W-League team based in Chicago, Illinois. The team began play in 1996 and folded after the 2004 season. The team colors were white and green.

== History ==
In 2001, reigning W-League W-1 champions Chicago Cobras voluntarily demoted themselves to the W-2 division after most of their best players left for the new Women's United Soccer Association.

== Year-by-year ==
Year	Division	League	Reg. season	Playoffs
1996	1	USL W-League	2nd, Central	Lost in Swizzlin' Six
1997	1	USL W-League	1st, Midwest	Final
1998	1	USL W-League W-1	1st, Central	Conference Semifinals
1999	1	USL W-League W-1	1st, Central	Final
2000	1	USL W-League W-1	1st, Central	Champion
2001	3	USL W-League W-2	2nd, Central	Third Place
2002	2	USL W-League	3rd, Midwest	Did not qualify
2003	2	USL W-League	1st, Midwest	Final
2004	1	USL W-League	1st, Midwest	Semifinals

== Honors ==
- USL W-League Champions: 2000
- USL W-League Midwest Division Champions: 1997, 2003, 2004
- USL W-League Central Division Champions: 1998, 1999, 2000
