= USL W-League (1995–2015) =

Former soccer league

- Founded: 1995
- Folded: 2015
- Country: United States; Canada
- Confederation: CONCACAF
- Number of clubs: 8
- Level on pyramid: 2
- Promotion to: None
- Relegation to: None
- Last champions: Washington Spirit Reserves
- Most championships: Los Angeles Blues (4 titles)

The USL W-League was a North American amateur women's soccer developmental organization. The league was a semi-professional, open league, giving college players the opportunity to play alongside established international players while maintaining their collegiate eligibility. The league was administered by the United Soccer Leagues system (the USL), which also oversees the men's United Soccer League and Premier Development League. The W-League announced on November 6, 2015, that it would cease operation ahead of 2016 season.

After the popularity of the 2019 FIFA Women's World Cup, though, USL began considerations for a new professional women's league; this effort eventually returned to the re-establishing of the league as the USL W League.

== History ==
The W-League's inaugural season was in 1995. Originally called the United States Interregional Women's League, it later changed its name to the W-League. Although at its inception some of the league's franchises were barely above amateur level, it provided a professional outlet for many of the top female soccer players in the country. With professionals driving the level of play, the league made a very strong debut performance.

From 1995 through the 1997 season the W-League was a single tier format (all teams at the same division). This changed before the 1998 season when the W-League became a two tier league. The top tier/division was called W-1 and lower division, W-2. This division was in effect through the 2001 season – the first year of the new US Women's first division league WUSA. The W-League returned to a single tier format in the 2002 season.

The W-League grew to a maximum of 41 teams for the 2008 season, but then began contracting rapidly. By the time the league suspended operations in 2015, there were three, six-team conferences. Of those 18 teams, eight went on to found United Women's Soccer (though the two Canadian teams were denied entry) and another seven joined the WPSL.

The revival of the W-League as the USL W League was announced on June 8, 2021, with eight founding teams due to begin play in 2022, none of which were revivals of teams from the original iteration of the W-League. Instead, many were associate with USL League One organizations.

== Teams ==
127 unique teams participated in the W-League over the course of its history. Fifteen still existed (at varying levels of activity) as of 2019.

Sortable full original team list

Name	State/Prov.	First year	Last year	Other names	Notes
Alabama Angels	AL	1996	1998		
Albuquerque Crush	NM	2002			
Arizona Heatwave	AZ	1995	2005		founding team; inactive 1996–2000
Arizona Strikers FC	AZ	2014	2015	Sedona FC Strikers (2014)	final team
Asheville Splash	NC	2002	2004		
Atlanta Classics	GA	1997	2000		
Atlanta Silverbacks Women	GA	2005	2015		final team; left to Women's Premier Soccer League
Austin Lady Lone Stars	TX	1999	2000		
Bay Area Breeze	CA	2013	2014		arrived from Women's Premier Soccer League
Braddock Road Stars Elite	VA	2014	2015		final team; left to Women's Premier Soccer League
Bradenton Athletics	FL	2004	2008		
Boston Renegades	MA	1995	2009	Boston Tornado (1995)	founding team
Buffalo FFillies	NY	1996	1998		
Buffalo Flash	NY	2009	2010		left to Women's Professional Soccer
Calgary Wildfire	AB	2004			
Carolina Elite Cobras	SC	2012	2015	Central SC Cobras (2012)	final team; left to Women's Premier Soccer League
Cary Lady Clarets	NC	2008	2009	Carolina RailHawks Women (2008)	
Central Jersey Splash	NJ	1997	1999		
Central Florida Krush	FL	2005	2006		
Charlotte Speed	NC	1997	1999	Carolina Speed (1997)	
Charlotte Lady Eagles	NC	2000	2015		final team
Chicago Cobras	IL	1996	2010	Chicago Gaels (2005–2008); Chicago Red Eleven (2009–2010)	
Cincinnati Ladyhawks	OH	2000	2006		
Cincinnati Leopards	OH	1995			founding team
Cleveland Eclipse	OH	1996	2001		
Cleveland Internationals Women	OH	2004	2010		left to Women's League Soccer
Cocoa Expos Women	FL	2006	2007		left to Women's Premier Soccer League
Colorado Pride	CO	2014	2015		final team; left to United Women's Soccer
Colorado Rush Women	CO	2010	2015		final team
Colorado Storm	CO	2014	2015		final team; left to United Women's Soccer
Columbus Lady Shooting Stars	OH	2003	2004		
Columbus Ziggx	OH	1995	1998		founding team
Connecticut Lady Wolves	CT	1995	1998		founding team
Connecticut Passion	CT	2008	2009		
Dallas Lightning	TX	1995	1997	Texas Lightning (1995)	founding team
Dayton Dutch Lions WFC	OH	2011	2015		final team; left to Women's Premier Soccer League
D.C. United Women	DC	2011	2012		left to National Women's Soccer League; spun off Washington Spirit Reserves
Delaware Genies	DE	1997	2000		
Denver Diamonds	CO	1996	2000		left to Women's Premier Soccer League
Edmonton Aviators Women	AB	2004			
FC Indiana	IN	2008	2009		arrived from Women's Premier Soccer League; left to Women's League Soccer
Finger Lakes Heartbreakers	NY	1998			
Fort Wayne Fever	IN	2004	2009		
Fredericksburg Impact	VA	2011	2013		
Fredericksburg Lady Gunners	VA	2007	2008		
Gulf Coast Chaos	MS	1997			
Gulf Coast Texans	FL	2014			arrived from Women's Premier Soccer League
Hamilton Avalanche	ON	2006	2014	Hamilton FC Rage (2011–2012); K-W United FC (2013–2014)	
Hampton Road Piranhas	VA	1995	2013	Virginia Beach Piranhas (2011–2013)	founding team
Houston Tornadoes	TX	1999	2001		
Hudson Valley Quickstrike Lady Blues	NY	2007	2010	Jersey Sky Blue (2007–2008)	
Indiana Blaze	IN	1997	2001		
Jackson Chargers	MS	1997	1999	Jackson Calypso (1997–1998)	
Jacksonville Jade	FL	1999	2002		
Kalamazoo Quest	MI	1998	1999		
Kalamazoo Outrage	MI	2008	2010		
Kansas City Mystics	KS	2001	2002		
Kentucky Fillies	KY	2000	2002		
Laval Comets	QC	2006	2015		final team; left to United Women's Soccer
Laval Dynamites	QC	1999	2001		
Lehigh Valley Cougars	PA	1996			
London Gryphons	ON	2004	2014		
Long Island Rough Riders	NY	1995	2015		founding team; final team; left to United Women's Soccer
Los Angeles Legends	CA	2008	2009		
Los Angeles Strikers	CA	2011	2013		merged with Pali Blues (2014)
Madison Freeze	WI	1996	1997		
Maryland Pride	MD	1995	2002	Baltimore Bays (1995)	founding team; left to Women's Premier Soccer League
Mass Bay Crusaders	MA	1995			founding team
Memphis Mercury	TN	2001	2002		
Miami Gliders	FL	1998	1999		
Michigan Hawks	MI	2004	2008	Detroit Jaguars (2004–2005)	
Mile High Mustangs	CO	2001	2007	Mile High Edge (2001–2004)	
Minnesota Lightning	MN	2006	2009		
Montreal Xtreme	QC	2004			
New Brunswick Power	NJ	2000			
New Hampshire Lady Phantoms	NH	1998	2006		
New Jersey Lady Stallions	NJ	1998	2004		
New Jersey Rangers	NJ	2008	2012		
New Jersey Wildcats	NJ	1996	2015		final team; left to Women's Premier Soccer League
New York Magic	NY	1997	2015		final team; left to United Women's Soccer
Norcal Shockwaves	CA	1996	1997		left to Women's Premier Soccer League
North Texas Heat	TX	1999	2000		
Northern Kentucky TC Stars	KY	2002	2003		
Northern Virginia Majestics	VA	1999	2012		
North Jersey Valkyries	NJ	2010	2015		final team; left to United Women's Soccer
Oklahoma Outrage	OK	2000	2002		
Orlando Ladyhawks	FL	1998			
Ottawa Fury FC	ON	2000	2014		
Piedmont Spark	NC	1999	2008	Greensboro Twisters (2002–2003); Carolina Dynamo (2004–2006, 2008)	inactive 2007
Pali Blues	CA	2008	2014	Los Angeles Blues (2014)	merged with Los Angeles Strikers (2014)
Philadelphia Frenzy	PA	1995	1997	Pennsylvania Freedom (1995)	founding team
Portland Rain	OR	2001			left to Women's Premier Soccer League
Quebec City Amiral SC	QC	2009	2015	Quebec Dynamo ARSQ (2014–2015)	final team; left to United Women's Soccer
Raleigh Wings	NC	1998	2000		
Real Colorado Cougars	CO	2000	2010	Colorado Gold (2000); Denver Lady Cougars (2001–2005)	
Rhode Island Rays	RI	1995	2004	Rhode Island Lady Stingrays (1996, 2004); Rhode Island Stingrays (1995)	founding team; left to Women's Premier Soccer League
Richmond Kickers Destiny	VA	2004	2009		
Rochester Ravens	NY	1996	2012		
Rockford Dactyls	IL	1995	2000		founding team
Sacramento Storm	CA	1995	1997	California Storm (1997)	founding team; left to Women's Premier Soccer League
San Diego Gauchos Women	CA	2005	2007	San Diego Sunwaves (2007)	
San Diego Top Guns	CA	1995			founding team
San Francisco Nighthawks	CA	1995	1997	San Francisco Vikings (1995)	founding team; left to Women's Premier Soccer League
Santa Clarita Blue Heat	CA	2008	2015	Ventura County Fusion (2008–2009)	final team; left to United Women's Soccer
Seattle Sounders Women	WA	2001	2015		final team; left to Women's Premier Soccer League
Silicon Valley Red Devils	CA	1996	1997		left to Women's Premier Soccer League
South Jersey Banshees	NJ	2001	2006		
Southern California Nitemares	CA	1995	1996		founding team
Springfield Sirens	MA	1999	2001		left to Women's Premier Soccer League
St. Louis Archers	MO	2004			left to Women's Premier Soccer League
Sudbury Canadians	ON	2004	2006		
Tampa Bay Hellenic	FL	2008	2010		left to Women's Premier Soccer League; merged with VSI Tampa Bay FC (2013)
Tampa Bay Xtreme	FL	1997	2002		
Texas Odyssey	TX	2001			
Toronto Inferno	ON	1999	2004		
Toronto Lady Lynx	ON	2005	2014		
Tulsa Roughnecks	OK	1995			founding team
Vancouver Whitecaps Women	BC	2001	2012	Vancouver Breakers (2001–2002)	
Vermont Lady Voltage	VT	2005	2008		
Victoria Highlanders Women	BC	2011	2012		
VSI Tampa Bay FC	FL	2012	2013	VSI Tampa Flames (2012)	merged with Tampa Bay Hellenic (2013)
Washington Freedom	DC	2006	2008		left to Women's Professional Soccer, spun off Washington Freedom Futures
Washington Freedom Futures	DC	2009	2010	Washington Freedom Reserves (2009)	
Washington Spirit Reserves	DC	2013	2015		final team; left to Women's Premier Soccer League
Western Mass Lady Pioneers	MA	2004	2009		
West Virginia Illusion	WV	2008			
Wichita Lady Blues	KS	1995			founding team
Windy City Bluez	IL	2001	2004		

W-League member(alt.name/merger†) WUSA / WPS / NWSL WPSL-WLS-UWS inactive / exhibition / other (*) indicates championship

== Past champions ==
For 1998 through 2001 the W-League was divided into two divisions: W-1 (the top division) W-2 (the lower division). The numbers in parentheses indicate the number of titles a club has won if they have won multiple titles. Click on year for W-League season summaries.

- 2015 Washington Spirit Reserves 2–1 Colorado Pride
- 2014 Los Angeles Blues (4) 6–1 Washington Spirit Reserves
- 2013 Pali Blues (3) 1–0 Laval Comets
- 2012 Ottawa Fury Women 1–1 (4–3 PSO) Pali Blues
- 2011 Atlanta Silverbacks Women 6–1 Ottawa Fury Women
- 2010 Buffalo Flash 3–1 Vancouver Whitecaps Women
- 2009 Pali Blues (2) 2–1 Washington Freedom Reserves
- 2008 Pali Blues 2–1 FC Indiana
- 2007 Washington Freedom 3–1 Atlanta Silverbacks Women
- 2006 Vancouver Whitecaps Women (2) 3–0 Ottawa Fury Women
- 2005 New Jersey Wildcats 3–0 Ottawa Fury Women
- 2004 Vancouver Whitecaps Women 0–0 (4–2 PSO) New Jersey Wildcats
- 2003 Hampton Roads Piranhas 1–0 Chicago Cobras
- 2002 Boston Renegades (2) 3–0 Charlotte Lady Eagles
- 2001
  - W-1: Boston Renegades 5–1 Vancouver Whitecaps Women
  - W-2: Charlotte Lady Eagles 3–1 Memphis Mercury
- 2000
  - W-1: Chicago Cobras 1–1 (4–2 PSO) Raleigh Wings
  - W-2: Springfield Sirens 2–1 Charlotte Lady Eagles
- 1999
  - W-1: Raleigh Wings (2) 3 -2 Chicago Cobras (OT)
  - W-2: North Texas Heat 5–1 Springfield Sirens
- 1998
  - W-1: Raleigh Wings 4–3 Boston Renegades
  - W-2: Fort Collins Force 3–1 Hampton Roads Piranhas
- 1997 Long Island Lady Riders (2) 2–1 Chicago Cobras (OT)
- 1996 Maryland Pride 3–0 Dallas Lightning
- 1995 Long Island Lady Riders 3–0 Southern California Nitemares
