= Boston Renegades =

Former women's soccer team

- Full name: Boston Renegades
- Nickname: Renegades
- Founded: 1995 (as Boston Tornado)
- Dissolved: 2009
- Stadium: Bowditch Field; Framingham, Massachusetts
- Capacity: 5,000
- Owner(s): John Curtis (1996); Tom Bagley; Reidar Tryggestad
- Chairman: Joe Bradley
- League: USL W-League
- 2008: 3rd, Northeast Division; Playoff Divisional Round
Home colors	Away colors

Boston Renegades was an American women's soccer team, founded in 1995. The team was a member of the United Soccer Leagues USL W-League, the second tier of women's soccer in the United States and Canada. The team played in the Northeast Division of the Eastern Conference, but folded during the 2009 season.

The team played its home games in the stadium on the campus of Wayland High School in the city of Wayland, Massachusetts, 15 miles (24 km) west of downtown Boston. The team's colors are red and white.

The team was run within the same ownership group as the former men's teams Boston Bulldogs and Cape Cod Crusaders. They won two consecutive W-League Championships in 2001 and 2002.

== Players ==
=== Squad 2009 ===
Note: Flags indicate national team as defined under FIFA eligibility rules; some limited exceptions apply. Players may hold more than one non-FIFA nationality.

No.	Pos.	Nation	Player
0	GK	USA	Meghann Burke
1	GK	CAN	Jasmine Phillips
2	DF	USA	Ella Stephan
3	MF	USA	Lauren MacIver
5	MF	USA	Jamie Craft
7	MF	USA	Stephanie Gilkenson
8	MF	SWE	Therese Lückner
9	DF	USA	Danielle Kot
10	MF	BRA	Gabriela Demoner
12	DF	USA	Victoria Huster

No.	Pos.	Nation	Player
13	FW	USA	Marcy Gans
14	FW	USA	Ashlee Pistorius
15	MF	USA	Toni Pressley
16	DF	USA	Rachel Smith
17	MF	USA	Alex Crown
19	DF	USA	Rachel Lim
21	FW	USA	Katie Bethke
22	DF	USA	Kelsey Hood
23	MF	USA	Laura Grace Robinson
—	DF	USA	Brianna Wilson

=== Club officials ===
- (Republic of Ireland) Peter Bradley, Technical Director
- (England) Jon Coles, Director of Operations
- (England) Andrew Moir, Director of Media
- (Scotland) Graham Munro, Director of Corporate Sales

== Year-by-year ==
Year	Division	League	Reg. season	Playoffs
1995	1	USL W-League	5th, Eastern	Did not qualify
1996	1	USL W-League	7th, East	Did not qualify
1997	1	USL W-League	3rd, Northeast	Did not qualify
1998	1	USL W-League W-1	1st, North	Final
1999	1	USL W-League W-1	3rd, North	Did not qualify
2000	1	USL W-League W-1	1st, Northeast	Third place
2001	2	USL W-League W-1	3rd, Northeast	Champion
2002	2	USL W-League	1st, Northern	Champion
2003	2	USL W-League	1st, Northern	Conference Semifinals
2004	1	USL W-League	1st, New England	Conference Semifinals
2005	1	USL W-League	2nd, Northeast	Conference Semifinals
2006	1	USL W-League	3rd, Northeast	Divisional Round
2007	1	USL W-League	4th, Northeast	Did not qualify
2008	1	USL W-League	3rd, Northeast	Divisional Round
2009	2	USL W-League	3rd, Northeast	Qualified but declined to participate

== Honors ==
- USL W-League Champions: 2001, 2002
- USL W-League Northeast Division Champions: 2000
- USL W-League New England Division Champions: 2004
- USL W-League Northern Division Champions: 1998, 2002, 2003

== Coaches ==
- (United States) Darren Gallagher 2007–2009
- (England) Rob Risley 2004

== Stadia ==
- Bowditch Field, Framingham, Massachusetts 1996–2009
- Stadium at Whitman-Hanson High School, Whitman, Massachusetts 2008 (1 game)
