= 2007 USL W-League season =

Football league

USL W-League
- Season: 2007
- Champions: Washington Freedom (1st Title)
- Regular Season title: Ottawa Fury Women (1st Title)
- Matches: 210
- Goals: 748 (3.56 per match)

The 2007 W-League Season was the league's 13th.

The Washington Freedom finished the season as national champions, beating the Atlanta Silverbacks Women 3–1 in the W-League Championship game in Rochester, New York on 7 August 2007.

Ottawa Fury Women finished with the best regular season record in the league, winning 11 out of their 12 games, suffering no losses, and finishing with a +38 goal difference.

== Changes from 2006 season ==
=== Name changes ===
Two teams changed their names: The Long Island Lady Riders changed their name to the Long Island Rough Riders, and the San Diego Lady Gauchos changed their name to the San Diego Sunwaves.

=== New teams ===
Three teams were added for the season:

| Team name | Metro area | Location | Previous affiliation |
|---|---|---|---|
| Fredericksburg Lady Gunners | Northern Virginia area | Fredericksburg, VA | expansion |
| Jersey Sky Blue | Northern New Jersey area | Madison, NJ | expansion |
| Washington Freedom | National Capital area | Washington, D.C. | associate member (former member of WUSA) |

=== Teams Leaving ===
Five teams folded after the 2006 season:

- Central Florida Krush
- Cincinnati Ladyhawks
- New Hampshire Lady Phantoms
- South Jersey Banshees
- Sudbury Canadians

Carolina Dynamo Women went on hiatus for this season.

== Standings ==
Blue indicates division title clinched
Green indicates playoff berth clinched
Orange indicates bye into the W-League semifinals as hosts.

=== Central Conference ===
==== Atlantic Division ====
| Pos | Team | Pld | W | L | T | GF | GA | GD | Pts |
|---|---|---|---|---|---|---|---|---|---|
| 1 | Atlanta Silverbacks Women | 12 | 9 | 2 | 1 | 25 | 10 | +15 | 28 |
| 2 | Richmond Kickers Destiny | 12 | 9 | 2 | 1 | 25 | 10 | +15 | 28 |
| 3 | Charlotte Lady Eagles | 12 | 8 | 2 | 2 | 31 | 10 | +21 | 26 |
| 4 | Cocoa Expos Women | 11 | 5 | 3 | 3 | 20 | 8 | +12 | 18 (Note: The Fredericksburg at Cocoa and Bradenton at Hampton Roads games were unable to be rescheduled before the end of the season, and were not played due to having no effect on the playoffs.) |
| 5 | Hampton Roads Piranhas | 11 | 2 | 8 | 1 | 9 | 22 | −13 | 7 |
| 6 | Bradenton Athletics | 11 | 1 | 9 | 1 | 9 | 32 | −23 | 4 |
| 7 | Fredericksburg Lady Gunners | 11 | 1 | 9 | 1 | 6 | 33 | −27 | 4 |

==== Midwest Division ====
| Pos | Team | Pld | W | L | T | GF | GA | GD | Pts |
|---|---|---|---|---|---|---|---|---|---|
| 1 | Minnesota Lightning | 12 | 10 | 1 | 1 | 27 | 8 | +19 | 31 |
| 2 | Michigan Hawks | 12 | 8 | 3 | 1 | 27 | 13 | +14 | 25 |
| 3 | Cleveland Internationals Women | 12 | 8 | 4 | 0 | 30 | 16 | +14 | 24 |
| 4 | Chicago Gaels | 12 | 7 | 4 | 1 | 39 | 17 | +22 | 22 |
| 5 | London Gryphons | 12 | 4 | 8 | 0 | 19 | 41 | −22 | 12 |
| 6 | Fort Wayne Fever | 12 | 1 | 9 | 2 | 8 | 27 | −19 | 5 |
| 7 | West Michigan Firewomen | 12 | 1 | 10 | 1 | 7 | 25 | −18 | 4 |

=== Eastern Conference ===
==== Northeast Division ====
| Pos | Team | Pld | W | L | T | GF | GA | GD | Pts |
|---|---|---|---|---|---|---|---|---|---|
| 1 | Washington Freedom | 14 | 12 | 1 | 1 | 48 | 10 | +38 | 37 |
| 2 | Jersey Sky Blue | 14 | 12 | 2 | 0 | 48 | 6 | +42 | 36 |
| 3 | Northern Virginia Majestics | 14 | 7 | 6 | 1 | 28 | 26 | +2 | 22 |
| 4 | Boston Renegades | 14 | 7 | 7 | 0 | 19 | 31 | −12 | 21 |
| 5 | New Jersey Wildcats | 14 | 5 | 5 | 4 | 16 | 13 | +3 | 19 |
| 6 | Long Island Rough Riders | 14 | 5 | 7 | 2 | 20 | 24 | −4 | 17 |
| 7 | New York Magic | 14 | 1 | 10 | 3 | 8 | 32 | −24 | 6 |
| 8 | Western Mass Lady Pioneers | 14 | 1 | 12 | 1 | 9 | 54 | −45 | 4 |

==== Northern Division ====
| Pos | Team | Pld | W | L | T | GF | GA | GD | Pts |
|---|---|---|---|---|---|---|---|---|---|
| 1 | Ottawa Fury Women | 12 | 11 | 0 | 1 | 47 | 9 | +38 | 34 |
| 2 | Toronto Lady Lynx | 12 | 7 | 3 | 2 | 29 | 16 | +13 | 23 |
| 3 | Laval Comets | 12 | 7 | 4 | 1 | 35 | 10 | +25 | 22 |
| 4 | Rochester Rhinos Women | 12 | 5 | 7 | 0 | 21 | 28 | −7 | 15 |
| 5 | Hamilton Avalanche | 12 | 2 | 10 | 0 | 11 | 42 | −31 | 6 |
| 6 | Vermont Lady Voltage | 12 | 2 | 10 | 0 | 9 | 47 | −38 | 6 |

=== Western Conference ===
| Pos | Team | Pld | W | L | T | GF | GA | GD | Pts |
|---|---|---|---|---|---|---|---|---|---|
| 1 | San Diego Sunwaves | 12 | 8 | 3 | 1 | 28 | 12 | +16 | 25 |
| 2 | Seattle Sounders Women | 12 | 7 | 4 | 1 | 21 | 14 | +7 | 22 |
| 3 | Vancouver Whitecaps Women | 12 | 6 | 3 | 3 | 24 | 17 | +7 | 21 |
| 4 | Fort Collins Force | 12 | 4 | 7 | 1 | 18 | 31 | −13 | 13 |
| 5 | Mile High Edge | 12 | 3 | 7 | 2 | 16 | 26 | −10 | 11 |
| 6 | Real Colorado Cougars | 12 | 3 | 7 | 2 | 11 | 18 | −7 | 11 |

== Playoffs ==
=== Format ===
Four teams qualify from the Central Conference, six from the Eastern Conference, and two from the Western Conference.

The Division Winners in the Central Conference will play the second place team of the other division. In the Eastern Conference, the second and third place team in each division will play, with the winner of that match playing the top team in the other division. Finally, the two winners of the latter matches will play for the Eastern Conference championship. The top two teams in the Western Conference will play each other.

The Rochester Raging Rhinos automatically qualify for the W-League Semifinals as hosts. They will play the highest-ranked Conference Champion in their semifinal, with the other two Conference Champions will play in the other.

=== Conference Brackets ===
Central Conference

Central Semifinals
MW1 | Minnesota Lightning | 4
AT2 | Richmond Kickers Destiny | 2
AT1 | Atlanta Silverbacks Women (AET) | 4
MW2 | Michigan Hawks | 2

Central Championship
MW1 | Minnesota Lightning | 2
AT1 | Atlanta Silverbacks Women | 5

Eastern Conference

Eastern Divisional Round
NO2 | Toronto Lady Lynx | 3
NO3 | Laval Comets | 1
NE2 | Jersey Sky Blue | 3
NE3 | Northern Virginia Majestics | 1

Eastern Semifinals
NE1 | Washington Freedom | 6
NO2 | Toronto Lady Lynx | 1
NO1 | Ottawa Fury Women | 4
NE2 | Jersey Sky Blue | 0

Eastern Championship
NE1 | Washington Freedom | 1
NO1 | Ottawa Fury Women | 0

Western Conference

| Western Finals |
| W1 | San Diego Sunwaves | 1 |
| W2 | Seattle Sounders Women | 2 |

=== W-League Championship Bracket ===
Semifinals
NE1 | Washington Freedom | 3
H | Rochester Raging Rhinos | 0
AT1 | Atlanta Silverbacks Women | 4
W2 | Seattle Sounders Women | 1

Championship
NE1 | Washington Freedom | 3
AT1 | Atlanta Silverbacks Women | 1
Consolation
W2 | Seattle Sounders Women | 2
H | Rochester Raging Rhinos | 1

=== Divisional Round ===
July 25, 2007
7:30 PM ET

| Toronto Lady Lynx | 3–1 | Laval Comets |
|---|---|---|
| Marton 47'; Ramsdale (yellow card) 48' (goal) 57'; Morra 70'; Harrison (yellow card) 85' | (Report) | Gagné 7'; Busque (yellow card) 54'; Bilodeau (yellow card) 83' |

Centennial Park Stadium
Toronto, Ontario
Attendance: 647
Referee: Patricia Peebles (USA)

July 25, 2007
7:30 PM ET

| Jersey Sky Blue | 3–1 | Northern Virginia Majestics |
|---|---|---|
| DiPaolo 8'; Dickenmann 19'; Griffin 42' | (Report) | Banks 66' |

Ranger Stadium, Drew University
Madison, New Jersey
Attendance: 263
Referee: Hossam Saad (USA)

=== Conference semifinals ===
July 28, 2007
2:00 PM ET

| Washington Freedom | 6–1 | Toronto Lady Lynx |
|---|---|---|
| Lindsey 13' 26'; Welsh 31'; Watson 76'; Hammond 80'; Porto 90' | (Report) | Harrison (yellow card) 45'; Romagnuolo (yellow card) 75'; Allysha Chapman 78' |

Keith Harris Stadium
Ottawa, Ontario
Attendance: 450
Referee: Marvin Mohring (CAN)

July 27, 2007
5:00 PM CT

| Atlanta Silverbacks Women | 4–0 | Michigan Hawks |
|---|---|---|
| Steinmann 14' 74'; 45' (OG); Harbrueger 87' | (Report) | Delvecchio (yellow card) 59' |

Macalester Stadium
Saint Paul, Minnesota
Attendance: 228
Referee: Jorge Ocontrillo (USA)

July 27, 2007
7:30 PM CT

| Minnesota Lightning | 4–2 (AET) | Richmond Kickers Destiny |
|---|---|---|
| Mueller 38'; Smith 69' 103' 110' | (Report) | Grier (yellow card) 68'; Sauerbrunn 79'; J. Parsons 88'; Stephens-David (yellow card) 97' |

Macalester Stadium
Saint Paul, Minnesota
Attendance: 1,619
Referee: Mishaun Ahmad (USA)

July 28, 2007
5:00 PM ET

| Ottawa Fury Women | 4–0 | Jersey Sky Blue |
|---|---|---|
| Taylor 30' 68'; Jeffers (yellow card) 44'; Laue 71'; Hamel 77' | (Report) |

Keith Harris Stadium
Ottawa, Ontario
Attendance: 450
Referee: Joe Audi (CAN)

=== Conference finals ===
July 28, 2007
7:00 PM ET

| Minnesota Lightning | 2–5 | Atlanta Silverbacks Women |
|---|---|---|
| Smith 85' 86' (PK); Storlien (coach) (red card) 90' | (Report) | Latham 4' 30'; Schneider 16'; Davey 22'; Harbrueger 69'; Eriksson (yellow card) 74'; Hall (yellow card) 85' |

Macalester Stadium
Saint Paul, Minnesota
Attendance: 1725
Referee: (USA)

July 29, 2007
5:00 PM ET

| Ottawa Fury Women | 0–1 | Washington Freedom |
|---|---|---|
| McCormack (yellow card) 23'; Hamel (yellow card) 61' | (Report) | Welsh 24'; Huffman (yellow card) 69' |

Keith Harris Stadium
Ottawa, Ontario
Attendance: 305
Referee: Carol Anne Chenard (CAN)

July 30, 2007
6:30 PM PT

| San Diego Sunwaves | 1–2 | Seattle Sounders Women |
|---|---|---|
| Epsten 30' (yellow card) 84' | (Report) | Bridges 34'; Patterson 60' |

Torero Stadium
San Diego, California
Attendance: 843
Referee: Marlene Duffy (USA)

=== W-League Semifinals ===
August 3, 2007
5:30 PM ET

| Atlanta Silverbacks Women | 4–1 | Seattle Sounders Women |
|---|---|---|
| Latham 44'; Minnax 47'; Buff 68'; Steinmann 80' | (Report) | Patterson 6' |

PAETEC Park
Rochester, New York
Referee: Katherine Dziedzic (USA)

August 3, 2007
8:00 PM ET

| Rochester Raging Rhinos | 0–3 | Washington Freedom |
|---|---|---|
| Kruze (yellow card) 84'; Russell (yellow card) 90' | (Report) | Huffman 10'; Moros 29'; Lindsey 53' |

PAETEC Park
Rochester, New York
Referee: Franco Bevilacqua (USA)

=== W-League Third-Place Game ===
August 5, 2007
2:30 PM ET

| Rochester Raging Rhinos | 1–2 | Seattle Sounders Women |
|---|---|---|
| Kinmond 70'; Bybee (yellow card) 90' | Report | Arrant 51'; Slawson 75'; Smith (yellow card) 90' |

PAETEC Park
Rochester, New York
Referee: Jeffrey Mellen (USA)

=== W-League Final ===
August 5, 2007
5:30 PM ET

| Washington Freedom | 3–1 | Atlanta Silverbacks Women |
|---|---|---|
| Moros 1'; Welsh 40' (yellow card) 85'; McCarty 88' | (Report) | Schneider (yellow card) 59'; Davey 67'; Buff (yellow card) 71'; Harbrueger (yellow card) 90' |

PAETEC Park
Rochester, New York
Referee: Dino Sorbara (USA)
