= 2006 USL W-League season =

USL W-League
- Season: 2006
- Champions: Vancouver Whitecaps Women (2nd Title)
- Regular Season title: New Jersey Wildcats (2nd Title)
- Matches: 246
- Goals: 943 (3.83 per match)

The 2006 W-League Season was the league's 12th.

== Changes from 2005 season ==
=== Name changes ===
- Denver Lady Cougars became Real Colorado Cougars.
- Detroit Jaguars became Michigan Hawks.
- Mile High Mustangs became the Mile High Edge.

=== New teams ===
Five teams were added for the season:

Team name	Metro area	Location	Previous affiliation
Central Florida Krush	Central Florida Area	Winter Park, FL	expansion
(Florida) Cocoa Expos Women	Space Coast area	Cocoa, FL	expansion
(Ontario) Hamilton Avalanche	Golden Horseshoe area	Hamilton, ON	expansion
(Quebec) Laval Comets	Greater Montreal area	Laval, QC	expansion
Minnesota Lightning	Twin Cities area	Falcon Heights, MN	expansion

=== Teams Leaving ===
One team folded after the 2005 season:

- Arizona Heatwave

== Standings ==
Blue indicates division title clinched
Green indicates playoff berth clinched
Orange indicates bye into the W-League semifinals as hosts.

=== Central Conference ===
==== Atlantic Division ====
Pos	Team	Pld	W	L	T	GF	GA	GD	Pts
1	Charlotte Lady Eagles	14	10	4	0	32	14	+18	30
2	Richmond Kickers Destiny	14	9	4	1	31	13	+18	28
3	Cocoa Expos Women	14	9	4	1	17	16	+1	28
4	Central Florida Krush	14	7	5	2	25	21	+4	23
5	Atlanta Silverbacks Women	14	6	7	1	23	17	+6	19
6	Hampton Roads Piranhas	14	5	8	1	18	28	−10	16
7	Bradenton Athletics	14	2	7	5	12	27	−15	11
8	Carolina Dynamo Women	14	1	10	3	7	29	−22	6

==== Midwest Division ====
Pos	Team	Pld	W	L	T	GF	GA	GD	Pts
1	Michigan Hawks	14	10	2	2	41	13	+28	32
2	Minnesota Lightning	14	9	3	2	34	19	+15	29
3	Cleveland Internationals Women	14	9	4	1	36	22	+14	28
4	Chicago Gaels	14	7	4	3	29	19	+10	24
5	Cincinnati Ladyhawks	14	5	6	3	33	33	0	18
6	London Gryphons	14	4	9	1	28	45	−17	13
7	Fort Wayne Fever	14	3	9	2	16	37	−21	11
8	West Michigan Firewomen	14	2	12	0	9	38	−29	6

=== Eastern Conference ===
==== Northeast Division ====
Pos	Team	Pld	W	L	T	GF	GA	GD	Pts
1	New Jersey Wildcats	14	14	0	0	61	3	+58	42
2	Western Mass Lady Pioneers	14	10	3	1	43	10	+33	31
3	Boston Renegades	14	9	3	2	52	16	+36	29
4	Long Island Lady Riders	14	7	5	2	28	17	+11	23
5	Northern Virginia Majestics	14	5	9	0	28	28	0	15
6	New York Magic	14	4	8	2	20	26	−6	14
7	South Jersey Banshees	14	2	11	1	10	50	−40	7
8	New Hampshire Lady Phantoms	14	0	12	2	14	96	−82	2

==== Northern Division ====
Pos	Team	Pld	W	L	T	GF	GA	GD	Pts
1	Ottawa Fury Women	12	10	1	1	38	7	+31	31
2	Toronto Lady Lynx	12	7	1	4	37	4	+33	25
3	Laval Comets	12	6	3	3	30	13	+17	21
4	Hamilton Avalanche	12	6	5	1	20	25	−5	19
5	Vermont Lady Voltage	12	4	7	1	12	24	−12	13
6	Rochester Rhinos Women	12	4	8	0	22	30	−8	12
7	Sudbury Canadians	12	0	12	0	2	58	−56	0

=== Western Conference ===
Pos	Team	Pld	W	L	T	GF	GA	GD	Pts
1	Vancouver Whitecaps Women	12	11	0	1	38	7	+31	34
2	Seattle Sounders Women	12	5	4	3	21	18	+3	18
3	Mile High Edge	12	4	6	2	22	23	−1	14
4	Real Colorado Cougars	12	3	4	5	25	27	−2	14
5	Fort Collins Force	12	3	7	2	15	25	−10	11
6	San Diego Lady Gauchos	12	2	7	3	14	35	−21	9

== Playoffs ==
=== Conference Brackets ===
Central Conference

Central Semifinals
MW1	Michigan Hawks	0
AT2	(Virginia) Richmond Kickers Destiny	2
AT1	(North Carolina) Charlotte Lady Eagles (p)	1 (4)
MW2	Minnesota Lightning	1 (3)

Central Championship
AT1	(Virginia) Richmond Kickers Destiny	0
AT1	(North Carolina) Charlotte Lady Eagles	1

Eastern Conference

Eastern Divisional
NE3	(Massachusetts) Boston Renegades	0
NE4	(New York (state)) Long Island Lady Riders	1
NO1	(Ontario) Ottawa Fury Women	3
NO2	(Ontario) Toronto Lady Lynx	2
NE2	(Massachusetts) Western Mass Lady Pioneers	1
NE5	Northern Virginia Majestics	0

Eastern Semifinals
NE1	New Jersey Wildcats (AET)	3
NE4	(New York (state)) Long Island Lady Riders	2
NO1	(Ontario) Ottawa Fury Women	3
NE2	(Massachusetts) Western Mass Lady Pioneers	0

Eastern Championship
NE1	New Jersey Wildcats	2
NO1	(Ontario) Ottawa Fury Women	3

Western Conference

Western Finals
W2	(Washington (state)) Seattle Sounders Women	1
W3	(Colorado) Mile High Edge	0

=== W-League Championship Bracket ===
Semifinals
H	(British Columbia) Vancouver Whitecaps Women	5
W2	(Washington (state)) Seattle Sounders Women	0
NO1	(Ontario) Ottawa Fury Women	2
AT1	(North Carolina) Charlotte Lady Eagles	1

Championship
H	(British Columbia) Vancouver Whitecaps Women	3
AT1	(Ontario) Ottawa Fury Women	0
Consolation
W1	(Washington (state)) Seattle Sounders Women	1
At1	(North Carolina) Charlotte Lady Eagles	0

=== Divisional Round ===
July 26, 2006
6:00 PM EDT

(Massachusetts) Boston Renegades	0 – 1	(New York (state)) Long Island Lady Riders
	(Report)	DeCristoforo (yellow card) 49'; Roebriy 66'

Bowditch Stadium
Framingham, Massachusetts
Attendance: 50
Referee: Rachael Woo (USA)

July 26, 2006
6:00 PM EDT

(Ontario) Ottawa Fury Women	3 – 2	(Ontario) Toronto Lady Lynx
Vermeulen 41' 62' (PK); Parker 49'	(Report)	Riverso 8'; Maroszeky 84'

Algonquin College Soccer Complex
Ottawa, Ontario
Attendance: 400
Referee: Dan Popescu (CAN)

July 26, 2006
7:30 PM EDT

(Massachusetts) Western Mass Lady Pioneers	1 – 0	Northern Virginia Majestics
D'Agostino 70'	(Report)

Lusitano Stadium
Ludlow, Massachusetts
Referee: Scott Kachmarik (USA)

=== Conference semifinals ===
July 28, 2006
5:30 PM EDT

Michigan Hawks	0 – 2	(Virginia) Richmond Kickers Destiny
Konheim (yellow card) 87'	(Report)	Parsons 2' 68'

Livonia-Stevenson HS Stadium
Livonia, Michigan
Attendance: 506
Referee: Rob Ellyson (USA)

July 28, 2006
8:00 PM EDT

(North Carolina) Charlotte Lady Eagles	1 – 1 (AET)	Minnesota Lightning
Timbers-Rife 18'	(Report)	Smith 49'; Preiss (yellow card) 58'; Gault (yellow card) 79'
Penalties
Ledford (penalty scored); Woody (penalty scored); Vandenbergh (penalty missed); Drummond (penalty scored); Birdswell (penalty missed); Hollenbeck (penalty scored)	4 – 3	(penalty missed) Gault; (penalty scored) Schneeman; (penalty scored) Smith; (penalty missed) McNallan; (penalty scored) Almanzo; (penalty missed) Schwartz

Livonia-Stevenson HS Stadium
Livonia, Michigan
Attendance: 506
Referee: Carlos Aragano (USA)

July 29, 2006
5:00 PM EDT

(Ontario) Ottawa Fury Women	3 – 0	(Massachusetts) Western Mass Lady Pioneers
Vermeulen 63' (PK); Robinson 72'; Wilkinson 73'	(Report)	Schoepfer (yellow card) 22'

Robbinsville HS Stadium
Robbinsville, New Jersey
Referee: Mike Deering (USA)

July 29, 2006
7:30 PM EDT

New Jersey Wildcats	3 – 2 (AET)	(New York (state)) Long Island Lady Riders
Fletcher 22'; Formiga 56'; Tomecka 120'	(Report)	Shulman 27' (yellow card) 120'; C. Arikian 90'; Cali (yellow card) 108'

Robbinsville HS Stadium
Robbinsville, New Jersey
Attendance: 445
Referee: Hossam Saad (USA)

=== Conference finals ===
July 29, 2006
5:00 PM EDT

(North Carolina) Charlotte Lady Eagles	1 – 0	(Virginia) Richmond Kickers Destiny
Mollon (yellow card) 33'; Drummond 70' (PK)	(Report)	Raveia (yellow card) 24'; Jones (yellow card) 79'; Sauerbrunn (yellow card) 85'; Anger (red card) 89'; Woodie (yellow card) 90'

Livonia-Stevenson HS Stadium
Livonia, Michigan
Attendance: 353
Referee: Ronnie Canales (USA)

July 30, 2006
5:00 PM EDT

New Jersey Wildcats	2 – 3	(Ontario) Ottawa Fury Women
Formiga 20'; Yamaguchi 61'	(Report)	Avner (yellow card) 8'; Vermeulen 21' 30' 36'

Robbinsville HS Stadium
Robbinsville, New Jersey
Attendance: 444
Referee: Bill Guarini (USA)

July 30, 2006
7:00 PM PDT

(Washington (state)) Seattle Sounders Women	1 – 0	(Colorado) Mile High Edge
Pulse 76'	(Report)

Starfire Sports Complex
Tukwila, Washington
Attendance: 355
Referee: Will Niccolls (USA)

=== W-League Semifinals ===
August 4, 2006
5:00 PM EDT

(Ontario) Ottawa Fury Women	2 – 1	(North Carolina) Charlotte Lady Eagles
Vermeulen 6'; Robinson 80'	(Report)	Deason (yellow card) 79'; Swinehart 90'

Swangard Stadium
Burnaby, British Columbia
Attendance: 3234
Referee: Michelle Pye (CAN)

August 4, 2006
7:30 PM PDT

(British Columbia) Vancouver Whitecaps Women	5 – 0	(Washington (state)) Seattle Sounders Women
Sinclair 8' 81'; Smith 48'; Franko 53'; Milbrett 57'	(Report)

Swangard Stadium
Burnaby, British Columbia
Attendance: 3234
Referee: Darcy Konowalchuck (CAN)

=== W-League Third-Place Game ===
August 6, 2006
2:00 PM PDT

(North Carolina) Charlotte Lady Eagles	0 – 1	(Washington (state)) Seattle Sounders Women
Deason (yellow card) 90'	[ (Report)]	Patterson 36'; Arrant (yellow card) 81'

Swangard Stadium
Burnaby, British Columbia
Attendance: 4218
Referee: Jill Proctor (CAN)

=== W-League Finals ===
August 6, 2006
5:00 PM PDT

(British Columbia) Vancouver Whitecaps Women	3 – 0	(Ontario) Ottawa Fury Women
Sinclair 33'; Franko 45'; Andrews 74'	(Report)	Alcia (yellow card) 56'

Swangard Stadium
Burnaby, British Columbia
Attendance: 4218
Referee: Carol-Anne Chenard (CAN)
