= 2008 USL W-League season =

USL W-League
- Season: 2008
- Champions: Pali Blues (1st Title)
- Regular Season title: Pali Blues (1st Title)
- Matches: 279
- Goals: 961 (3.44 per match)
- Top goalscorer: (United States) Sarah Steinmann Atlanta Silverbacks Women (19 Goals)
- Best goalkeeper: (United States) Valerie Henderson Pali Blues

The 2008 W-League Season was the league's 14th. The regular season began on May 10, 2008, and ended on July 20.

Pali Blues finished the season as national champions, beating FC Indiana 2–1 in the W-League Championship game in Virginia Beach, Virginia on 2 August 2008.

The Pali Blues also finished with the best regular season record in the league, winning all 12 of their matches, and finishing with a +35 goal difference.

Atlanta Silverbacks Women's striker Sarah Steinmann was the league's top scorer, with 19 goals. FC Indiana's Laura Del Rio led the league with 13 assists, while Pali Blues goalkeeper Valerie Henderson enjoyed the best goalkeeping statistics, with a goals-against average of 0.142 per game, and posting 6 shutouts.

== Changes from 2007 season ==
Nine teams were added for the season:

Team name	Metro area	Location	Previous affiliation
(North Carolina) Carolina Dynamo	Greensboro area	Greensboro, NC	expansion
(North Carolina) Carolina RailHawks	Research Triangle area	Cary, NC	expansion
Connecticut Passion	Hartford and New Haven areas	Berlin, CT	expansion
FC Indiana	Indianapolis area	Indianapolis, IN	previously in WPSL
(Michigan) Kalamazoo Outrage	Kalamazoo area	Kalamazoo, MI	expansion
(California) Los Angeles Legends	suburban Los Angeles area	Azusa, CA	expansion
(California) Pali Blues	Los Angeles area	Los Angeles, CA	expansion
(Florida) Tampa Bay Hellenic	Tampa Bay area	Tampa, FL	expansion
West Virginia Illusion	Morgantown/North-Central West Virginia areas	Fairmont, WV	expansion

Three teams folded after the 2007 season: Mile High Edge, and San Diego Sunwaves. Cocoa Expos Women left the league for the WPSL.

== Standings ==
Orange indicates W-League title and bye into W-League semifinals.
Blue indicates division title clinched
Green indicates playoff berth clinched

=== Central Conference ===
==== Midwest Division ====
Pos	Team	Pld	W	L	T	GF	GA	GD	Pts
1	FC Indiana	14	13	0	1	67	3	+64	40
2	Chicago Gaels	14	11	3	0	39	9	+30	33
3	Minnesota Lightning	14	9	3	2	32	19	+13	29
4	Cleveland Internationals Women	14	8	4	2	31	23	+8	26
5	Michigan Hawks	14	4	9	1	12	33	−21	13
6	Kalamazoo Outrage	14	2	10	2	6	36	−30	8
7	Fort Wayne Fever	13	2	10	1	16	39	−23	7 (Note: Fort Wayne and West Michigan did not play each other a second time, as the game could not be rescheduled before July 20 and would not affect the playoffs.)
8	West Michigan Firewomen	13	1	11	1	11	52	−41	4

==== Northern Division ====
Pos	Team	Pld	W	L	T	GF	GA	GD	Pts
1	Ottawa Fury Women	14	13	1	0	51	7	+44	39
2	Toronto Lady Lynx	14	11	2	1	40	14	+26	34
3	Laval Comets	14	9	4	1	39	17	+22	28
4	Rochester Rhinos Women	14	6	6	2	18	33	−15	20
5	Hamilton Avalanche	14	5	6	3	19	21	−2	18
6	Western Mass Lady Pioneers	14	3	9	2	18	34	−16	11
7	London Gryphons	14	3	9	2	15	35	−20	11
8	Vermont Lady Voltage	14	0	13	1	5	44	−39	1

=== Eastern Conference ===
==== Atlantic Division ====
Pos	Team	Pld	W	L	T	GF	GA	GD	Pts
1	Atlanta Silverbacks Women	14	13	0	1	50	6	+44	40
2	Charlotte Lady Eagles	14	11	2	1	44	13	+31	34
3	Tampa Bay Hellenic	14	8	4	2	27	16	+11	26
4	Hampton Roads Piranhas	14	7	6	1	29	19	+10	22
5	Carolina RailHawks	14	7	6	1	22	17	+5	22
6	Richmond Kickers Destiny	14	6	8	0	18	28	−10	18
7	Carolina Dynamo	14	4	8	2	23	30	−7	14
8	Bradenton Athletics	14	2	12	0	11	52	−41	6
9	West Virginia Illusion	14	1	13	0	6	46	−40	3

==== Northeast Division ====
Pos	Team	Pld	W	L	T	GF	GA	GD	Pts
1	Washington Freedom	14	11	1	2	32	7	+25	35
2	Long Island Rough Riders	14	9	3	2	28	13	+15	29
3	Boston Renegades	14	9	3	2	32	12	+20	29
4	Jersey Sky Blue	14	8	4	2	14	10	+4	26
5	Connecticut Passion	14	7	5	2	24	23	+1	23
6	Northern Virginia Majestics	14	3	6	5	17	23	−6	14
7	New York Magic	14	3	7	4	14	23	−9	13
8	New Jersey Wildcats	14	2	10	2	17	35	−18	8
9	Fredericksburg Lady Gunners	14	0	13	1	5	37	−32	1

=== Western Conference ===
Pos	Team	Pld	W	L	T	GF	GA	GD	Pts
1	Pali Blues	12	12	0	0	39	4	+35	36
2	Vancouver Whitecaps Women	12	7	2	3	21	18	+3	24
3	Seattle Sounders Women	12	5	3	4	19	11	+8	19
4	Real Colorado Cougars	12	5	4	3	15	19	−4	18
5	Fort Collins Force	12	3	6	3	15	19	−4	12
6	Los Angeles Legends	12	1	9	2	11	26	−15	5
7	Ventura County Fusion	12	1	10	1	9	32	−23	4

== Playoffs ==
=== Format ===
Five teams each from the Central and Eastern Conferences, and two from the Western Conference, qualify for the playoffs.

In the Central Conference, the second and third place teams from the Northern Division play a one-leg playoff with the winner advancing to the Conference Semifinals, where they will play the Midwest Division champion. The other semifinal will have the second place team from the Midwest Division playing the Northern Division champion.

In the Eastern Conference, the second and third place teams from the Northeast Division play a one-leg playoff with the winner advancing to play the Atlantic Division champion. The other semifinal will have the second place team from the Atlantic Division playing the Northeast Division champion.

The two teams in the Western Conference will play each other to advance to the W-League Semifinals.

The Regular Season champion, Pali Blues, receive a bye into the W-League semifinals, with the second and third place teams from the Western Conference receiving playoff berths.

=== Conference Brackets ===
Central Conference

Central Divisional Round
NO2	(Ontario) Toronto Lady Lynx	0
NO3	(Quebec) Laval Comets	2

Central Semifinals
MW1	FC Indiana	5
NO3	(Quebec) Laval Comets	1
NO1	(Ontario) Ottawa Fury Women	3
MW2	(Illinois) Chicago Gaels	2

Central Championship
MW1	FC Indiana (AET)	4
NO1	(Ontario) Ottawa Fury Women	3

Eastern Conference

Eastern Divisional Round
NE2	(New York (state)) Long Island Rough Riders	1
NE3	(Massachusetts) Boston Renegades	0

Eastern Semifinals
AT1	(Georgia (U.S. state)) Atlanta Silverbacks Women	1
NE2	(New York (state)) Long Island Rough Riders	0
NE1	(Washington, D.C.) Washington Freedom (AET)	6
AT2	(North Carolina) Charlotte Lady Eagles	5

Eastern Championship
AT1	(Georgia (U.S. state)) Atlanta Silverbacks Women	1
NE1	(Washington, D.C.) Washington Freedom (AET)	2

Western Conference

Western Finals
W1	(British Columbia) Vancouver Whitecaps Women	0
W2	(Washington (state)) Seattle Sounders Women	1

Pali captured the W-League regular season title and bye into W-League semifinals, enabling Vancouver to take their spot in the Conference Playoffs, and allowing Seattle to clinch a playoff berth.

=== W-League Championship Bracket ===
Semifinals
WL	(California) Pali Blues	2
NE1	(Washington, D.C.) Washington Freedom	0
MW1	FC Indiana	1
W2	(Washington (state)) Seattle Sounders Women	0

Championship
WL	(California) Pali Blues	2
MW1	FC Indiana	1
Consolation
NE1	(Washington, D.C.) Washington Freedom	2
W1	(Washington (state)) Seattle Sounders Women	0

=== Divisional Rounds ===
July 23, 2008
7:00 ET

(New York (state)) Long Island Rough Riders	1 – 0	(Massachusetts) Boston Renegades
DeRosa	(Report)

St. Anthony's High School
South Huntington, New York
Attendance: 387
Referee: Samir Souidi (USA)

July 23, 2008
7:30 ET

(Ontario) Toronto Lady Lynx	0 – 2	(Quebec) Laval Comets
Chapman (yellow card) 40' (red card) 89'; Afonso (yellow card) 66'	(Report)	Gagné 8' 40'; Walsh (red card) 89'

Centennial Park Stadium
Toronto, Ontario
Attendance: 344
Referee: Michael Izzo (CAN)

=== Conference semifinals ===
July 25, 2008
4:00 ET

(Ontario) Ottawa Fury Women	3 – 2	(Illinois) Chicago Gaels
Taylor 12' 62' (PK); Powell 15'	(Report)	Mutters (yellow card) 12'; Spacht 26'; Trevillian (yellow card) 74'; Maynard 89' (PK)

Varsity Soccer Complex
West Lafayette, Indiana
Attendance: 50
Referee: Tony Deldis (USA)

July 25, 2008
5:00 ET

(Washington, D.C.) Washington Freedom	6 – 5 (AET)	(North Carolina) Charlotte Lady Eagles
Welsh 2' 16' 103'; Keller 22'; Moros 70' (PK); Janss 97'	(Report)	Rife 11'; Schmedes 29'; Murphy 59' 107'; Lyons 66'

RE/MAX Greater Atlanta Stadium
Atlanta, Georgia
Attendance: 152
Referee: William Deland (USA)

July 25, 2008
6:30 ET

FC Indiana	5 – 1	(Quebec) Laval Comets
Hamel 14'; Sesselmann 16' 25' (yellow card) 27'; Parker 63'; Phewa 72'	(Report)	Gagné 55' (PK)

Varsity Soccer Complex
West Lafayette, Indiana
Attendance: 128
Referee: Andrew Scott (USA)

July 25, 2008
8:00 ET

(Georgia (U.S. state)) Atlanta Silverbacks Women	1 – 0	(New York (state)) Long Island Rough Riders
Latham 51'; Buff (yellow card) 70'; Harbrueger (yellow card) 90'	(Report)	Fitzgerald (coach) (red card) 82'; Speck (yellow card) 90'

RE/MAX Greater Atlanta Stadium
Atlanta, Georgia
Attendance: 485
Referee: Patrick Baker (USA)

=== Conference finals ===
July 26, 2008
7:00 ET

(British Columbia) Vancouver Whitecaps Women	0 – 1	(Washington (state)) Seattle Sounders Women
	(Report)	Baysa 67' (yellow card) 84'

Swangard Stadium
Burnaby, British Columbia
Attendance: 4,991
Referee: Darci Kurse (USA)

July 26, 2008
8:00 ET

(Georgia (U.S. state)) Atlanta Silverbacks Women	1 – 2 (AET)	(Washington, D.C.) Washington Freedom
Bobo (yellow card) 16'; Latham 23'; Phillips (yellow card) 73'	(Report)	Golebiowski (yellow card) 48'; Welsh 77' (yellow card) 90'; Andrzejewski 118'

RE/MAX Greater Atlanta Stadium
Atlanta, Georgia
Attendance: 428
Referee: Tony Russo (USA)

July 27, 2008
6:30 ET

FC Indiana	4 – 3 (AET)	(Ontario) Ottawa Fury Women
Sesselmann 15'; Nault (yellow card) 63'; Del Rio 90+2' 96'; Phewa 101'	(Report)	Kennedy (yellow card) 27'; Milyak 53' (OG); Hance 65'; Avner (yellow card) 85'; Taylor 116' (PK); Raber (yellow card) 120'

Varsity Soccer Complex
West Lafayette, Indiana
Referee: (USA)

=== W-League Semifinals ===
July 31, 2008
5:00 PM ET

FC Indiana	1 – 0	(Washington (state)) Seattle Sounders Women
Phewa (yellow card) 16'; Leyva 87'

Foster Field
Virginia Beach, Virginia
Referee: Debbie Coleman (USA)

July 31, 2008
8:00 PM ET

(California) Pali Blues	2 – 0	(Washington, D.C.) Washington Freedom
Adams 26' 82'	Report	Welsh (yellow card) 76'

Foster Field
Virginia Beach, Virginia
Attendance: 427
Referee: Meredith Hackett (USA)

=== W-League Third-Place Game ===
August 2, 2008
4:30 PM ET

(Washington, D.C.) Washington Freedom	2 – 0	(Washington (state)) Seattle Sounders Women
Welsh 11' (yellow card) 40'; Huffman (yellow card) 76'; Andrzejewski 86'

Foster Field
Virginia Beach, Virginia
Referee: Shawn Fitch (USA)

=== W-League Finals ===
August 2, 2008
7:30 PM ET

(California) Pali Blues	2 – 1	FC Indiana
Wilson (yellow card) 49'; LePeilbet 83'; Pasqui 88'		O'Rourke 47'

Foster Field
Virginia Beach, Virginia
Attendance: 558
Referee: Sandra Serafini (USA)
