= 2011 USL W-League season =

USL W-League
- Season: 2011
- Champions: Atlanta Silverbacks Women (1st Title)
- Regular Season title: Ottawa Fury Women (2nd Title)
- Matches: 158
- Goals: 493 (3.12 per match)

The 2011 W-League season was the 17th season of the league's existence, and 8th season of second division women's soccer in the United States. The regular season began on May 14 and ended on July 17.

== Changes from 2010 season ==
=== Name changes ===
One team changed their name in the off-season:

Team name	Metro area	Previous name
(Ontario) Hamilton FC Rage	Hamilton area	Hamilton Avalanche

=== Expansion teams ===
Five teams were added for the season:

Team name	Metro area	Location	Previous affiliation
(Ohio) Dayton Dutch Lions	Dayton area	Bellbrook, OH	expansion
(Washington, D.C.) D.C. United Women	Washington, D.C. area	Boyds, MD	expansion
(Virginia) Fredericksburg Impact	Fredericksburg area	Fredericksburg, VA	expansion
(Virginia) Los Angeles Strikers	Los Angeles area	Fullerton, CA	expansion
(British Columbia) Victoria Highlanders Women	Victoria area	Victoria, BC	expansion

=== Teams leaving ===
Six teams either folded or left following the 2010 season:

- Chicago Red Eleven
- Hudson Valley Quickstrike Lady Blues
- Kalamazoo Outrage
- Tampa Bay Hellenic (joined WPSL)
- Washington Freedom Futures (disbanded when Washington Freedom franchise relocated to South Florida)
- Western New York Flash (joined WPS)

== Standings ==
As of 7/17/2011
Orange indicates Host Team for W-League Championship
Purple indicates division title clinched
Green indicates playoff berth clinched

=== Central Conference ===
==== Central Division ====
Team	Pld	W	L	T	GF	GA	GD	Pts
Ottawa Fury Women	12	12	0	0	43	5	+38	36
Laval Comets	12	6	4	2	21	20	+1	20
Quebec City Amiral	12	6	5	1	23	19	+4	19
Toronto Lady Lynx	12	5	5	2	12	18	−6	17
Hamilton FC Rage	12	3	7	2	16	22	−6	11
Rochester Ravens	12	2	6	4	12	23	−11	10
London Gryphons	12	1	8	3	10	30	−20	6

=== Eastern Conference ===
==== Atlantic Division ====
Team	Pld	W	L	T	GF	GA	GD	Pts
Atlanta Silverbacks Women	10	9	1	0	25	5	+20	26 (Note: Atlanta Silverbacks Women deducted one point.)
Charlotte Lady Eagles	10	6	2	2	17	6	+11	20
Dayton Dutch Lions	10	5	3	2	23	16	+7	17
Virginia Beach Piranhas	10	5	5	0	23	21	+2	15
Fredericksburg Impact	10	2	7	1	10	29	−19	7
Northern Virginia Majestics	10	0	9	1	4	25	−21	1

==== Northeast Division ====
Team	Pld	W	L	T	GF	GA	GD	Pts
Long Island Rough Riders	10	7	1	2	30	7	+23	23
New Jersey Wildcats	10	6	1	3	15	8	+7	20 (Note: New Jersey Wildcats and New Jersey Rangers deducted one point.)
D.C. United Women	10	5	3	2	15	9	+6	17
North Jersey Valkyries	10	3	4	3	15	14	+1	12
New York Magic	10	3	6	1	14	22	−8	10
New Jersey Rangers	10	0	9	1	4	33	−29	0

=== Western Conference ===
==== Western Division ====
Team	Pld	W	L	T	GF	GA	GD	Pts
Santa Clarita Blue Heat	14	8	1	5	30	12	+18	29
Vancouver Whitecaps Women	14	8	2	4	27	14	+13	28
Pali Blues	14	7	1	6	20	10	+10	27
Colorado Rush Women	14	6	5	3	19	18	+1	21
Seattle Sounders Women	14	5	5	4	19	19	0	19
Los Angeles Strikers	14	4	9	1	17	31	−14	13
Colorado Force	14	3	9	2	16	25	−9	11
Victoria Highlanders Women	14	1	10	3	13	32	−19	6

== Playoffs ==
- Note: Seattle Sounders Women hosts the W-League Championship and gains an automatic berth in the National Semi-Finals.

=== Eastern Conference Playoffs ===
July 21, 2011
5:30 PM EDT

(North Carolina) Charlotte Lady Eagles	2 - 1	(New York (state)) Long Island Rough Riders
Huecker 33' 42'	Report	Fenix 52' (o.g.)

Charlotte Christian Stadium
Charlotte, NC
Attendance: 466
Referee: Arthur Banning

July 21, 2011
8:00 PM EDT

(Georgia (U.S. state)) Atlanta Silverbacks Women	3 - 2	New Jersey Wildcats
Dennis 12'; Pollack 43'; Tomlinson 70'; Newfield (yellow card) 84'	Report	Lopez 18'; Fuccello 63'

Charlotte Christian Stadium
Charlotte, NC
Referee: Brandon Marion

July 22, 2011
5:30 PM EDT

(North Carolina) Charlotte Lady Eagles	0 - 1	(Georgia (U.S. state)) Atlanta Silverbacks Women
Naeher (yellow card) 72'	Report	Newfield 9'; Balaam (yellow card) 44'

Charlotte Christian Stadium
Charlotte, NC
Attendance: 700
Referee: Aaron Hernandez

Divisional Semifinals
NE1	Long Island Rough Riders	1
A2	Charlotte Lady Eagles	2
A1	Atlanta Silverbacks Women	3
NE2	New Jersey Wildcats	2

Divisional Final
A2	Charlotte Lady Eagles	0
A1	Atlanta Silverbacks Women	1

=== Central Conference Playoffs ===
July 23, 2011
3:00 PM EDT

(Ontario) Ottawa Fury Women	4 - 0	(Ontario) Toronto Lady Lynx
Busque 12' 20' 58'; Outerbridge 31'	Report	Afonso (yellow card) 82'

Algonquin College Soccer Complex
Ottawa, ON
Attendance: 348
Referee: Michael Stenbring

July 23, 2011
6:00 PM EDT

(Quebec) Laval Comets	1 - 3 (a.e.t.)	Quebec City Amiral
Charron-Delage 51'; Tremblay (yellow card) 80'	Report	Laverdiere 5' 101'; Roy 93'

Algonquin College Soccer Complex
Ottawa, ON
Attendance: 130
Referee: Sean Hornsby

July 24, 2012
3:00 PM EDT

(Ontario) Ottawa Fury Women	6 - 0	Quebec City Amiral
Outerbridge 17'; Shufelt 24' 39' 55'; Julien 83' 90+'	Report

Algonquin College Soccer Complex
Ottawa, ON
Attendance: 674
Referee: Joe Audi

Divisional Semifinals
C1	Ottawa Fury Women	4
C4	Toronto Lady Lynx	0
C2	Laval Comets	1
C3	Quebec City Amiral	3

Divisional Final
C1	Ottawa Fury Women	6
C3	Quebec City Amiral	1

=== Western Conference Playoff ===
July 24, 2011
7:00 PM PDT

(California) Santa Clarita Blue Heat	3 - 4	(British Columbia) Vancouver Whitecaps Women
Franco 18'; Beard 53'; Fisher 56'	Report	Leroux 32'; Franko 45'; Kyle 47'; Marton (yellow card) 81' (red card); Richardson 87'

Cougar Stadium
Santa Clarita, CA
Attendance: 450
Referee: Absbeer Singh

== W-League Championship ==
=== Semi-finals ===
July 29, 2011
4:00PM PDT

(Georgia (U.S. state)) Atlanta Silverbacks Women	3 - 1	(British Columbia) Vancouver Whitecaps Women
Tomlinson 16' 54'; Newfield (yellow card) 42'; Pollock 73'	Report	Weimer 18'; Kyle (yellow card) 41'

Starfire Sports Complex
Tukwila, WA

July 29, 2011
7:00PM PDT

(Washington (state)) Seattle Sounders Women	2 - 3	(Ontario) Ottawa Fury Women
Baumgardt 80'; Charette 89'	Report	Hastings (yellow card) 4'; Outerbridge 18' 55'; Wetzel 48'; Ramirez (red card) 79'; Wollner (yellow card) 85'

Starfire Sports Complex
Tukwila, WA
Referee: Ron Labraff

==== Third Place Playoff ====
July 31, 2011
1:00 PM PDT

(Washington (state)) Seattle Sounders Women	1 - 2	(British Columbia) Vancouver Whitecaps Women
Charette 21'	Report	Stoltenberg 47'; Kyle 65'

Starfire Sports Complex
Tukwila, WA
Referee: Will Nichols

=== Championship ===
July 31, 2011
4:00 PM PDT

(Ontario) Ottawa Fury Women	1 - 6	(Georgia (U.S. state)) Atlanta Silverbacks Women
Wetzel (red card) 31'; Outerbridge 49'	Report	Tomlinson 9' 74'; Dennis 30' 54'; Pollock 32'; Bennett 89'

Starfire Sports Complex
Tukwila, WA
Referee: Ekaterina Koraevtt

Semi-Finals
1	Ottawa Fury Women	3
4	Seattle Sounders Women	2
2	Atlanta Silverbacks Women	3
3	Vancouver Whitecaps Women	1

Championship
1	Ottawa Fury Women	1
2	Atlanta Silverbacks Women	6
