= 2013 USL W-League season =

USL W-League
- Season: 2013
- Champions: Pali Blues (3rd Title)
- Regular Season title: Virginia Beach Piranhas (1st Title)
- Matches: 145
- Goals: 449 (3.1 per match)
- Best player: (Wales) Shan Jones Virginia Beach Piranhas
- Top goalscorer: (Wales) Shan Jones Virginia Beach Piranhas (11 Goals)
- Best goalkeeper: (Canada) Genevieve Richard Laval Comets
- Biggest home win: WAS 7, NJV 0 (June 1); WAS 8, NJW 1 (June 15)
- Biggest away win: PAL 6, SCB 1 (June 2)
- Highest scoring: WAS 8, NJW 1 (June 15)
- Highest attendance: 4,569; NJW @ WAS (June 15)
- Lowest attendance: 53; DDL @ VSI (June 8); FRD @ NJV (July 6)
- Average attendance: 384 (126 of 145 games reporting)

The 2013 W-League season is the 19th season of the league's existence, and 10th season of second division women's soccer in the United States. The regular season started on May 11 and ended on July 14.

== Changes from 2012 season ==
=== Name changes ===
Three teams changed their name in the off-season:

Team name	Metro area	Previous Name
(Ontario) K-W United FC	Hamilton area	Hamilton FC Rage
(South Carolina) Carolina Elite Cobras	Columbia, SC	Central SC Cobras
(Florida) VSI Tampa Bay FC	Tampa Bay Area	VSI Tampa Flames

=== Expansion teams ===
Two teams were added for the season:

Team name	Metro area	Location	Previous affiliation
(California) Bay Area Breeze	San Francisco Bay Area	San Francisco, California	WPSL
(Washington, D.C.) Washington Spirit Reserves	Washington Metropolitan Area	Boyds, Maryland	expansion

=== Teams leaving ===
- Five teams folded or self-relegated following the 2012 season:
  - New Jersey Rangers - Denville, New Jersey
  - Northern Virginia Majestics - Manassas, Virginia
  - Rochester Ravens - Rochester, New York
  - Vancouver Whitecaps Women - Vancouver, British Columbia
  - Victoria Highlanders Women - Victoria, British Columbia
- One team moved following the 2012 season
  - D.C. United Women was renamed Washington Spirit and moved to the National Women's Soccer League. The Washington Spirit Reserves team was created, which then joined the W-League.

== Standings ==
As of 7/14/2013
2013 W-League Champion
2013 Division Title
2013 Playoff Team

=== Northeastern Conference ===
Pos	Team	Pld	W	L	T	GF	GA	GD	Pts
1	Virginia Beach Piranhas	12	10	1	1	32	12	+20	31
2	Washington Spirit Reserves	12	7	3	2	28	9	+19	23
3	Long Island Rough Riders	12	6	6	0	23	20	+3	18
4	New York Magic-FA Euro	12	4	6	2	13	20	−7	14
5	Fredericksburg Impact	12	3	5	4	17	19	−2	13
6	North Jersey Valkyries	12	3	7	2	13	29	−16	11
7	New Jersey Wildcats	12	3	8	1	16	33	−17	9 (Note: New Jersey Wildcats deducted one point.)

=== Southeastern Conference ===
Pos	Team	Pld	W	L	T	GF	GA	GD	Pts
1	Dayton Dutch Lions	10	5	2	3	15	13	+2	18
2	Carolina Elite Cobras	10	5	4	1	10	11	−1	16
3	Atlanta Silverbacks Women	10	4	4	2	20	14	+6	14
4	Charlotte Lady Eagles	10	4	5	1	10	11	−1	13
5	VSI Tampa Bay FC	10	3	6	1	14	20	−6	10

=== Central Conference ===
Pos	Team	Pld	W	L	T	GF	GA	GD	Pts
1	Laval Comets	12	8	1	3	21	7	+14	27
2	Ottawa Fury Women	12	7	3	2	21	8	+13	23
3	Toronto Lady Lynx	12	5	2	5	21	13	+8	20
4	K-W United FC	12	4	6	2	11	19	−8	14
5	Quebec City Amiral	12	3	7	2	11	22	−11	11
6	London Gryphons	12	0	8	4	8	24	−16	4

=== Western Conference ===
Pos	Team	Pld	W	L	T	GF	GA	GD	Pts
1	Pali Blues	12	8	2	2	29	9	+20	26
2	Los Angeles Strikers	12	8	4	0	26	20	+6	24
3	Seattle Sounders Women	12	7	3	2	23	17	+6	23
4	Colorado Rapids Women	12	5	5	2	19	21	−2	17
5	Bay Area Breeze	12	4	6	2	15	22	−7	14
6	Santa Clarita Blue Heat	12	4	7	1	20	27	−7	13
7	Colorado Rush	12	0	9	3	13	29	−16	3

== Playoffs ==
Nine teams qualified for the postseason with one champion advancing from each conference to the 2013 W-League Championship, to be held at the IMG Academy in Bradenton, Florida.

=== Northeastern Conference Playoff ===
July 19, 2013
8:00pm EDT

Virginia Beach Piranhas	1–2	(Washington, D.C.) Washington Spirit Reserves
Anyanwu 45+'; Jones (yellow card) 62'	Report; Report	Chang (yellow card) 24'; Siegel 57'; Herndon 64'; Mendes (yellow card) 90+'

Virginia Beach Sportsplex
Virginia Beach, Virginia
Attendance: 847
Referee: Michael Samaan

=== Southeastern Conference Playoff ===
July 19, 2013
7:00pm CDT

(Ohio) Dayton Dutch Lions	1–2	(South Carolina) Carolina Elite Cobras
Fillion 88'	Report; Report	Turpin 23'; Trotter 45'

Beavercreek Stadium
Beavercreek, Ohio
Attendance: 422
Referee: Tori Penso

=== Central Conference Playoffs ===
July 17, 2013
7:00pm EDT

(Ontario) Ottawa Fury Women	5–1	(Ontario) Toronto Lady Lynx
Woods 18' 46'; Gavilsky 18'; Gielnik 73'; Hughes 86'	Report; Report	Velaj 45+' (pen.)

Algonquin College Soccer Complex
Ottawa, Ontario
Attendance: 234
Referee: Jason Olinski

July 20, 2013
4:00pm EDT

(Quebec) Laval Comets	1–1 (a.e.t.)	(Ontario) Ottawa Fury Women
Wilson 12' (pen.); Legault-Cordisco (yellow card) 28'	Report; Report; Report	Gielnik 56'
Penalties
(penalty scored) (penalty scored) (penalty scored) (penalty missed) (penalty missed) (penalty scored); Pierre-Louis (penalty scored)	5–4	(penalty missed) Gavilsky; (penalty scored) Gielnik; (penalty scored) Woods; (penalty scored) Mottershead; (penalty missed) Chapic; (penalty scored) Fancher; (penalty missed) Hughes

Centre Sportif Bois-de-Boulogne
Laval, Quebec
Attendance: 653
Referee: Mitchell Carvalho

=== Western Conference Playoff ===
July 21, 2013
12:30pm PDT

(California) Pali Blues	2–0	(California) Los Angeles Strikers
Stengel 27'; Ubogagu 90+'	Report

Titan Stadium
Fullerton, California
Attendance: 247
Referee: Reyna Fonseca

== W-League Championship ==
=== Semi-finals ===
July 26, 2013
2:00pm EDT

(California) Pali Blues	3–2 (a.e.t.)	(Washington, D.C.) Washington Spirit Reserves
Nick 26'; Stengel 65'; Ubogagu 109'	Report; Report	Sullivan 43'; Mendes 90' (yellow card) 117'

IMG Academy

July 26, 2013
5:00pm EDT

(Quebec) Laval Comets	3–2 (a.e.t.)	(South Carolina) Carolina Elite Cobras
Julien 29'; Wilson 41'; Robbins (yellow card) 67'; Acton (yellow card) 89'; Sanderson 110'; Pierre-Louis (yellow card) 113'	Report; Report	Devita 25'; Kurtz 66'

IMG Academy

=== Third Place Playoff ===
July 28, 2013
12:00pm EDT

(Washington, D.C.) Washington Spirit Reserves	2–1	(South Carolina) Carolina Elite Cobras
Herndon 36'; Own Goal 83'	Report	Baer 88'

IMG Academy

=== Championship ===
July 28, 2013
2:30pm EDT

(Quebec) Laval Comets	0–1	(California) Pali Blues
Charron-Delage (yellow card) 77'	Report; Report	Walsh 87' (o.g.)

IMG Academy
Referee: Cedric Adams

Semi-Finals
1	Laval Comets (AET)	3
4	Carolina Elite Cobras	2
2	Pali Blues (AET)	3
3	Washington Spirit Reserves	2

Championship
1	Laval Comets	0
2	Pali Blues	1

== Statistical leaders ==
=== Top scorers ===
Rank	Player	Nation	Club	Goals
1	Shan Jones	ENG	Virginia Beach Piranhas	11
2	Jessica Fuccello	USA	New Jersey Wildcats	9
3	Kristen Hamilton	USA	Colorado Rapids Women	8
3	Savannah Jordan	USA	Atlanta Silverbacks	8
3	Brittany Pfaff	USA	New York Magic - F.A. Euro	8
6	Grace Hawkins	USA	Long Island Rough Riders	7
6	Ashley Nick	USA	Pali Blues	7
8	Ana Borges	POR	Santa Clarita Blue Heat	6
8	Emilie Fillion	CAN	Dayton Dutch Lions	6
8	Ashley Herndon	USA	Washington Spirit Reserves	6
8	Kristy Moore	AUS	Los Angeles Strikers	6

== Awards ==
- Most Valuable Player: (Wales) Shan Jones, (VIR)
- Rookie of the Year: (Wales) Shan Jones, (VIR)
- Defender of the Year: (United States) Blakely Mattern, (CAR)
- Coach of the Year: (Canada) Cindy Walsh, (LAV)
- Goalkeeper of the Year: (Canada) Genevieve Richard, (LAV)
- Playoff MVP: (United States) Ashley Nick, (PAL)

== All-League and All-Conference Teams ==
=== Northeastern Conference ===
F: (United States) Jessica Fuccello (NJW), (United States) Grace Hawkins (LIR), (Wales) Shan Jones (VIR) *
M: (Nigeria) Esther Anyanwu (VIR), (England) Amber Stobbs (WAS), (Puerto Rico) Alicia Tirelli (NJW)
D: (United States) Rachel Breton (NJW), (United States) Gabby Charno (LIR), (United States) Meghan Cox (WAS), (United States) Jessica Kalonji (VIR)
G: (United States) Lauren Vetock (VIR)

=== Southeastern Conference ===
F: (Canada) Emilie Fillion (DDL), (United States) Savannah Jordan (ATL) *, (Liberia) Cherie Sayon (ATL)
M: (United States) Stacy Bishop (TAM), (Brazil) Leah Fortune (CHR), (United States) Amanda Naeher (CHR)
D: (United States) McCallie Jones (CHR), (United States) Blakely Mattern (CAR) *, (United States) Meghan Scharer (DDL), (United States) Ashley Swinehart (CAR)
G: (United States) Elizabeth Hull (CAR)

=== Central Conference ===
F: (Canada) Nkemjika Ezurike (LAV), (Australia) Emily Gielnik (OTT), (Albania) Furtuna Velaj (TOR)
M: (Canada) Chantelle Campbell (LAV), (Canada) Catherine Charron-Delage (LAV), (Canada) Alyscha Mottershead (OTT) *
D: (Canada) Kathryn Acton (LON) *, (Canada) Kadeisha Buchanan (TOR), (Canada) Diamond Simpson (KWU), (Canada) Shelina Zadorsky (OTT)
G: (Canada) Genevieve Richard (LAV) *

=== Western Conference ===
F: (Portugal) Ana Borges (SCL), (United States) Danica Evans (COL), (United States) Kristen Hamilton (CRW) *
M: (Canada) Melissa Busque (SEA) *, (United States) Sarah Killion (PAB), (United States) Ashley Nick (PAB) *
D: (Canada) Sasha Andrews (PAB), (England) Rachel Daly (LAS), (United States) Danielle Johnson (BAB) *, (Australia) Brooke Spence (COR) *
G: (Canada) Erin McNulty (SEA)

* denotes All-League player
