= 2012 D.C. United Women season =

D.C. United Women
2012 season
- General manager: Chris Hummer
- Head coach: Michael Jorden
- Stadium: Maryland SoccerPlex
- USL W-League: Division: 1st Conference: 1st Overall: 2nd
- U.S. National Women's Cup: Did not enter
- W-League Playoffs: Divisional semifinals
| Home colors | Away colors |

The 2012 D.C. United Women season was the club's second season of existence, and their second in the USL W-League, the second tier of women's soccer in the United States at the time. United went undefeated in the Atlantic Division of the W-League's Eastern Conference and were division champions.

The regular season was the strongest showing by the squad in their existence, accumulating 11 wins and one draw in their 12-match season. The undefeated record resulted in United having the best regular season record in both the Eastern Conference and the Atlantic Division, as well as the second best overall record of the 30 W-League clubs. United finished the season thirteen points clear of the Virginia Beach Piranhas, the Division runners-up.

The team played the W-League Playoffs for the first time ever.

It was the final season with the club using the "D.C. United Women" moniker. In 2013, the club was rebranded as the Washington Spirit for the newly created National Women's Soccer League. The reserve team continued to play in the W-League.

== Review ==
=== Preseason ===
| April 21, 2012 | D.C. United Women | 1–0 | Maryland Terrapins | Germantown, Maryland |
| 19:00 EST | Sample 60' | Report | | Stadium: Maryland SoccerPlex |

| May 12, 2012 | D.C. United Women | 0–1 | Boston Breakers | Germantown, Maryland |
| 18:00 EST | | Report | Simon 56' | Stadium: Maryland SoccerPlex; Attendance: 1,022 |

=== W-League ===
==== Standings ====
Eastern Conference standings

Atlantic Division standings

| Team | GP | W | L | T | GF | GA | GD | Pts |
|---|---|---|---|---|---|---|---|---|
| D.C. United Women | 12 | 11 | 0 | 1 | 37 | 8 | +29 | 34 |
| Fredericksburg Impact | 11 | 6 | 3 | 2 | 27 | 18 | +9 | 20 |
| Virginia Beach Piranhas | 11 | 5 | 2 | 3 | 16 | 8 | +8 | 18 |
| Northern Virginia Majestics | 12 | 2 | 9 | 1 | 7 | 28 | −21 | 7 |
| Dayton Dutch Lions | 12 | 0 | 9 | 3 | 10 | 32 | −22 | 3 |

==== Match reports ====
| May 19, 2012 1 | D.C. United Women | 2–0 | Virginia Beach Piranhas | Germantown, Maryland |
| 19:00 EST | Howell 36', 60' | Report | | Stadium: Maryland SoccerPlex; Attendance: 664; Referee: Rebekah Friedrich |

| May 27, 2012 2 | D.C. United Women | 3–0 | Northern Virginia Majestics | Germantown, Maryland |
| 19:45 EST | Baker 71'; Howell 74' (pen.); King 83' | Report | | Stadium: Maryland SoccerPlex; Attendance: 421; Referee: Mathew Richardson |

| May 31, 2012 3 | Dayton Dutch Lions | 2–3 | D.C. United Women | Bellbrook, Ohio |
| 19:30 EST | Agueci 45'; Fillion 56' | Report | Sample 28'; Baker 29'; Malagari (yellow card) 77'; Cooper 88' (o.g.) | Stadium: Miami Valley South Stadium; Attendance: 278; Referee: Brrandon Artis |

| June 2, 2012 4 | Dayton Dutch Lions | 0–2 | D.C. United Women | Bellbrook, Ohio |
| 17:30 EST | | | | Stadium: Miami Valley South Stadium |

| June 9, 2012 5 | Fredericksburg Impact | 2–3 | D.C. United Women | Fredericksburg, Virginia |
| 17:30 EST | | | | Stadium: UMW Battleground Stadium |

| June 16, 2012 6 | Northern Virginia Majestics | 1–5 | D.C. United Women | Manassas, Virginia |
| 19:00 EST | | | | Stadium: Hellwig Memorial Field Stadium |

| June 20, 2012 7 | D.C. United Women | 5–0 | Fredericksburg Impact | Boyds, Maryland |
| 19:00 EST | | | | Stadium: Maryland SoccerPlex |

| June 23, 2012 8 | D.C. United Women | 1–1 | Virginia Beach Piranhas | Boyds, Maryland |
| 19:00 EST | | | | Stadium: Maryland SoccerPlex |

| June 26, 2012 9 | Northern Virginia Majestics | 0–2 | D.C. United Women | Manassas, Virginia |
| 19:00 EST | | | | Stadium: Hellwig Memorial Field Stadium |

| July 1, 2012 10 | D.C. United Women | 4–1 | Fredericksburg Impact | Boyds, Maryland |
| 17:00 EST | Brown 7'; Sanderson 9', 53'; Howell 26' | Report | Lybert 10'; Blocker (yellow card) 67' | Stadium: Maryland SoccerPlex; Attendance: 421; Referee: Adrian Krell |

| July 7, 2012 11 | D.C. United Women | 4–1 | Dayton Dutch Lions | Boyds, Maryland |
| 17:00 EST | Sanderson 34'; Sauerbrunn 53'; Sullivan 56'; Herndon 59' | Report | Agueci 45' | Stadium: Maryland SoccerPlex; Attendance: 703; Referee: Rebekah Friedrich |

| July 14, 2012 12 | Virginia Beach Piranhas | 0–3 | D.C. United Women | Virginia Beach, Virginia |
| 20:00 EST | | Report | Baker 7'; Sanderson 40'; Howell 47' | Stadium: Virginia Beach Sportsplex; Referee: Michael Samaan |

=== W-League Playoffs ===
| July 21, 2012 Divisional semifinals | D.C. United Women | 3 - 0 | Virginia Beach Piranhas | Boyds, Maryland |
| 18:00 EST | Hayley Siegel 23'; Lohman (yellow card) 32' (goal) 80'; Sanderson 45' | Summary | | Stadium: Maryland SoccerPlex; Attendance: 628; Referee: Michael Piercey |

| July 22, 2012 Divisional Finals | Charlotte Lady Eagles | 0 - 3 | D.C. United Women | Boyds, Maryland |
| 16:00 EST | Amanda Naeher (yellow card) 65' | Summary | Sanderson 28', 52'; Hayley Siegel 42' | Stadium: Maryland SoccerPlex; Attendance: 688; Referee: Rebekah Friedrich |

| July 27, 2012 Championship Semi-finals | Ottawa Fury Women | 1 - 0 | D.C. United Women | Ottawa, Ontario |
| 19:30 EST | Lydia Hastings 44'; Katrina-Lee Gorry (yellow card) 77' | Summary | | Stadium: Algonquin College Soccer Complex; Attendance: 585; Referee: Sheena Dickson |

== See also ==
- 2012 in American soccer
- 2012 W-League season
- 2012 W-League Playoffs
- 2012 D.C. United season
