= Shannon Lynn =

Canadian-born Scottish footballer (born 1985)

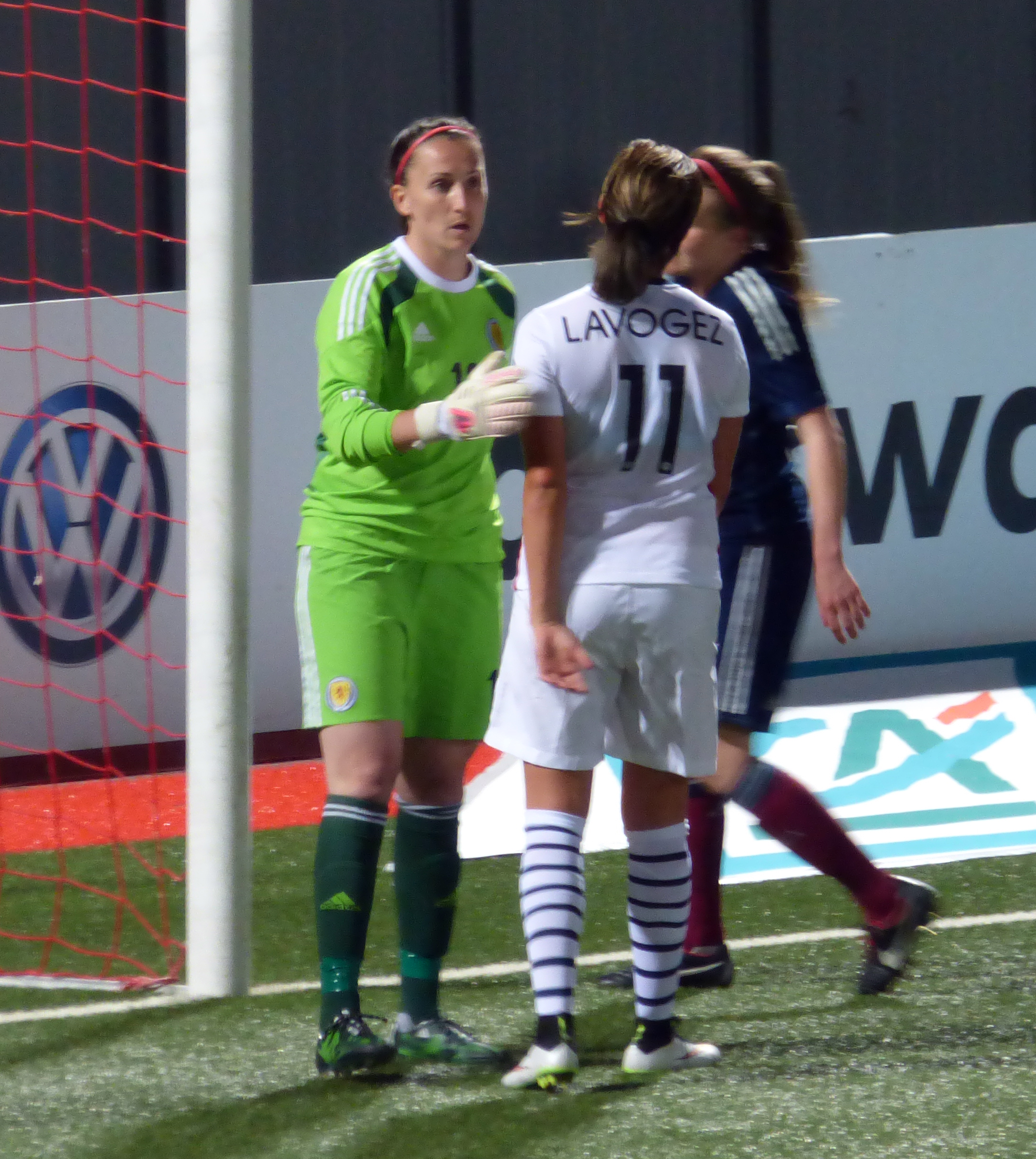
- Lynn playing for Scotland in May 2015

Personal information
- Date of birth: 22 October 1985 (age 41)
- Place of birth: Brampton, Ontario, Canada
- Position: Goalkeeper

College career
Years	Team	Apps	(Gls)
2004–2006	IPFW Mastodons		

Senior career*
Years	Team	Apps	(Gls)
2007–2008	Fort Wayne Fever		
2009	F.C. Indiana	21	(0)
2009–2014	Hibernian Ladies	10	(0)
2013	Chelsea Ladies	3	(0)
2014–2022	Vittsjö GIK	78	(0)
2023–2024	FC Rosengård		
2025	FC Rosengård		

International career^{‡}
2010–2020	Scotland	31	(0)
- * Club domestic league appearances and goals as of 10:47, 18 December 2022 (UTC) ‡ National team caps and goals as of 16:07, 16 April 2023 (UTC)

Shannon Lynn (born 22 October 1985) is a Canadian-born Scottish former footballer who played as a goalkeeper. She has previously played in the North American W-League for Fort Wayne Fever and F.C. Indiana, in the Scottish Women's Premier League for Hibernian and in the FA WSL for Chelsea Ladies. Lynn made her senior Scotland debut against Switzerland in June 2010.

== Career ==
Lynn's first start for Scotland was a 2–0 win over England at the 2011 Cyprus Cup; the Scots' first win over the Auld Enemy for 34 years. Lynn won the Scottish Players' Player of the Year award for 2011.

Lynn joined Chelsea in an emergency deal in April 2013, after the club's only fit keeper Nicola Davies was posted to Oman with the Royal Air Force. She continued to train with Hibs while flying down for matches for the duration of the short-term contract. With Carly Telford recovered from a broken hand, Lynn was allowed to rejoin Hibernian in July 2013.

Lynn joined Swedish side Vittsjö GIK in April 2014 on a three-month contract.

== Personal life ==
Lynn has spoken about suffering from depression due to the sudden death of her girlfriend when she was 22 and how football rescued her.

== Career statistics ==
=== International appearances ===
As of the match played on 11 April 2023

Appearances and goals by national team and year
National team	Year	Apps	Goals
Scotland	2010	1	0
Scotland	2011	3	0
Scotland	2012	2	0
Scotland	2013	5	0
Scotland	2014	—	
Scotland	2015	5	0
Scotland	2016	1	0
Scotland	2017	8	0
Scotland	2018	3	0
Scotland	2019	2	0
Scotland	2020	1	0
Total		31	0
