= Chicago Red Eleven =

American soccer team

- Full name: Chicago Red Eleven
- Nickname: The Red Eleven
- Founded: 2005
- Dissolved: 2010
- Stadium: Benedictine University
- Capacity: 3,000
- League: USL W-League
- 2010: 2nd, Midwest Division; Playoff First round
Home colours	Away colours

Chicago Red Eleven was an American women's soccer team, founded in 2005. The team was a member of the United Soccer Leagues W-League, the second tier of women's soccer in the United States and Canada. The team played in the Midwest Division of the Central Conference. The team folded after the 2010 season.

== History ==
Prior to the 2009 season they were known as the Chicago Gaels. The Gaels are not a continuation of the Chicago Cobras

== Stadium ==
The team played its home games in the stadium on the campus of Benedictine University in the city of Lisle, Illinois, 27 miles west of downtown Chicago. The team's colors was red, white and pale blue.

== Owners ==
- Ted Gradel was the owner and General Manager

== Year-by-year ==
Year	Division	League	Reg. season	Playoffs
2005	1	USL W-League	6th, Midwest	
2006	1	USL W-League	4th, Midwest	
2007	1	USL W-League	4th, Midwest	
2008	1	USL W-League	2nd, Midwest	Conference Semifinals
2009	2	USL W-League	2nd, Midwest	First round
2010	2	USL W-League	2nd, Midwest	First round

=== Season detail 2009 ===
Teams in the conference Fort Wayne, Grand Rapids, Indianapolis, Kalamazoo Outrage, Medina, Minneapolis and the Chicago Red Stars.

=== Season detail 2010 ===
Teams in the conference Buffalo Flash, Kalamazoo Outrage, Medina, London Gryphons and the Chicago Red Stars.

=== 2011 ===
Team Folded Operations
