= West Michigan Firewomen =

- Full name: West Michigan Firewomin
- Nickname: The Firewomin
- Founded: 2004
- Ground: Jenison HS Stadium
- Chairman: (United States) Brock West
- Manager: (South Africa) Neathan Gibson
- League: USL W-League
- 2008: 8th, Midwest Division
| Home colours | Away colours |

West Michigan Firewomen was an American women's soccer team, founded in 2004. The team was a member of the United Soccer Leagues W-League, the second tier of women's soccer in the United States and Canada. The team played in the Midwest Division of the Central Conference against teams from Chicago, Fort Wayne, Indianapolis, Kalamazoo Outrage, Medina and Minneapolis.

The team played its home games in the stadium on the campus of Jenison High School in the city of Jenison, Michigan, 9 miles (14 km) south-west of downtown Grand Rapids, Michigan. The club's colors were red and white.

The team was a sister organization of the men's Chicago Fire Premier team, which plays in the USL Premier Development League, and an affiliate of the Chicago Fire Major League Soccer franchise.

The Firewomen folded after its 2009 season.

== Players ==
=== Current roster ===
Note: Flags indicate national team as defined under FIFA eligibility rules; some limited exceptions apply. Players may hold more than one non-FIFA nationality.

| No. | Pos. | Nation | Player |
|---|---|---|---|
| 0 | GK | USA | Kristina Nasturzio |
| 1 | GK | USA | Colleen Doughtery |
| 2 | DF | USA | Amber Bloem |
| 3 | MF | USA | Hannah Lankford |
| 5 | DF | USA | Carly Bykerk |
| 6 | MF | USA | Mary Koscielniak |
| 7 | MF | USA | Erin Mruz |
| 8 | MF | USA | Courtney Nash |
| 9 | DF | USA | Ellen Phillips |
| 10 | MF | USA | Molly Gerst |
| 11 | FW | USA | Irie Dennis |
| 12 | MF | USA | Tara Wegner |
| 13 | MF | USA | Lauren King |

| No. | Pos. | Nation | Player |
|---|---|---|---|
| 14 | DF | USA | Kourtney Willert |
| 15 | FW | USA | Erica Rohern |
| 16 | MF | USA | Erin DeYoung |
| 17 | MF | USA | Rebecca Reese |
| 18 | FW | USA | Jill Hayes |
| 19 | DF | USA | Kristen Pelkki |
| 20 | DF | USA | Ali Nicoles |
| 21 | FW | USA | Jacquie Lacek |
| 22 | MF | USA | Jenna Fagerman |
| 23 | FW | USA | Jennifer Tafler |
| 25 | MF | USA | Julie Drummond |
| 26 | DF | USA | Sarah Kaufman |
| — | GK | USA | Catherine Howard |

== Year-by-year ==
| Year | Division | League | Reg. season | Playoffs |
|---|---|---|---|---|
| 2004 | 1 | USL W-League | 7th, Midwest | |
| 2005 | 1 | USL W-League | 7th, Midwest | |
| 2006 | 1 | USL W-League | 8th, Midwest | |
| 2007 | 1 | USL W-League | 7th, Midwest | |
| 2008 | 1 | USL W-League | 8th, Midwest | Did not qualify |
| 2009 | 1 | USL W-League | 7th, Midwest | |
