= Katie Williams (footballer) =

Welsh footballer (born 1984)

Personal information
- Full name: Katie Williams
- Date of birth: 24 May 1984 (age 42)
- Place of birth: Bangor, Wales
- Height: 1.63 m (5 ft 4 in)
- Position: Defender

Team information
- Current team: Cardiff City

Senior career*
Years	Team	Apps	(Gls)
2000–2004	Bangor City Girls F.C.		
2004–2007	Tranmere Rovers		
2007–2009	Blackburn Rovers		
2008	Fredericksburg Lady Gunners		
2009–2011	Liverpool		

International career^{‡}
2004–2010	Wales	20	(0)
- * Club domestic league appearances and goals ‡ National team caps and goals as of 1 October 2010

Katie Williams (born 24 May 1984) is a former footballer who played for the Welsh national team and Liverpool. Williams played as a central defender and accumulated twenty caps for Wales.

== Club career ==
Williams began her career at home-town club Bangor City, before moving on to Tranmere Rovers and Blackburn Rovers. She spent the 2008 off-season in the American W-League with the Fredericksburg Lady Gunners but suffered a damaged cruciate ligament. Williams also played for Caernarfon Town in the North Wales Women's Football League in 2015/2016 season.

On her recovery she joined Liverpool. In February 2011 Williams remained registered to Liverpool, but she was not included in the club's 2011 FA WSL squad.

== International career ==
Williams won six caps for Wales at U19 level. She made her senior debut in a 3–2 Algarve Cup win over Portugal in March 2004.
