= Carrie Dew =

American former soccer defender

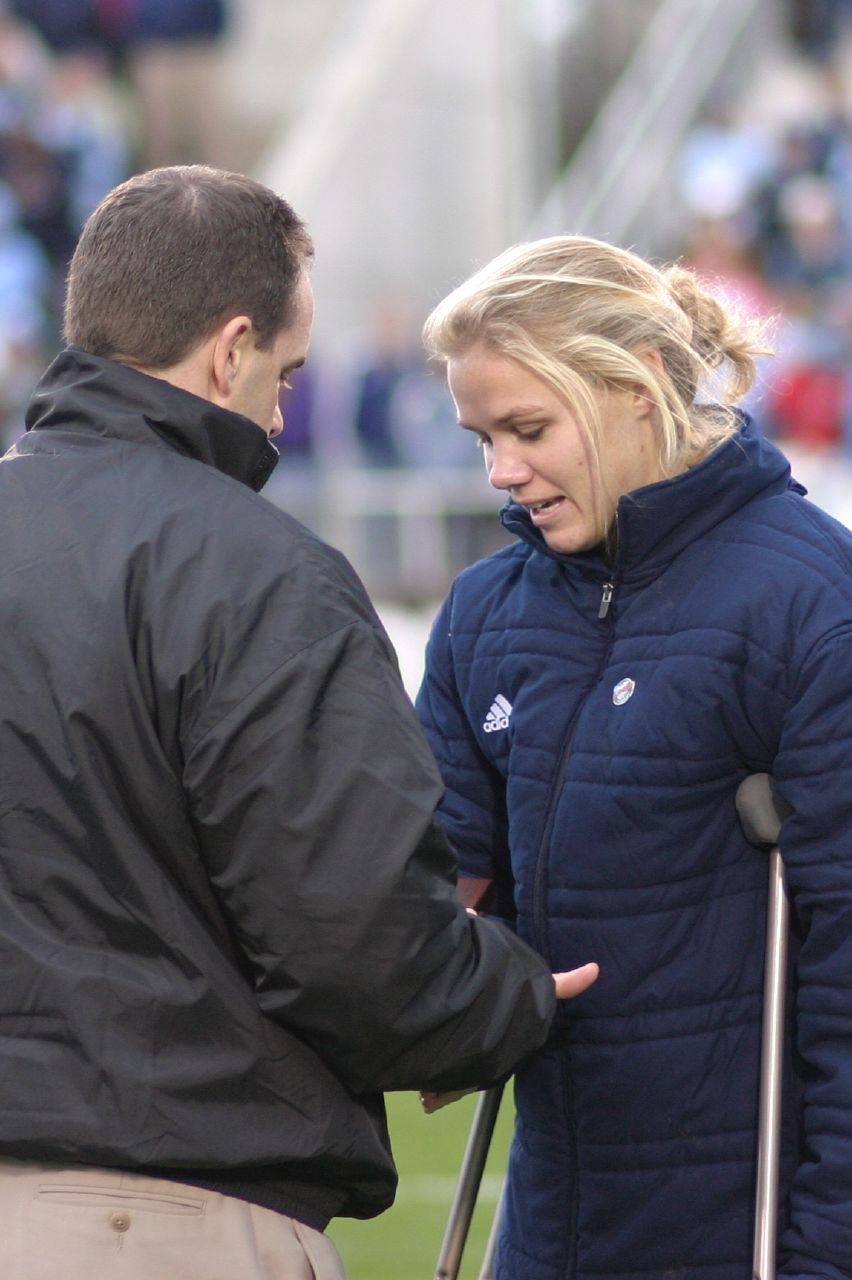

Personal information
- Full name: Caroline Frances Dew
- Date of birth: December 8, 1986 (age 39)
- Place of birth: San Diego, California, United States
- Height: 5 ft 9 in (1.75 m)
- Position: Defender

College career
Years	Team	Apps	(Gls)
2005–2008	Notre Dame Fighting Irish	92	(8)

Senior career*
Years	Team	Apps	(Gls)
2006	San Diego Gauchos	1	(0)
2008	Pali Blues	4	(0)
2009–2010	FC Gold Pride	32	(2)
2011	Sky Blue FC	17	(0)

International career^{‡}
2002–2003	United States U-17		
2005–2006	United States U-20		
2007–2009	United States U-23		
- * Club domestic league appearances and goals as of July 9, 2017 ‡ National team caps and goals as of 01:36, October 14, 2009 (UTC)

Caroline Frances Dew (born December 8, 1986) is an American former soccer defender who last played for Sky Blue FC of Women's Professional Soccer (WPS).

== Personal ==
Dew was born in San Diego, California and grew up in the city of Encinitas, California with her parents, Jim and Pam, and older sister Natalie. She graduated with honors from the Mendoza College of Business at the University of Notre Dame with a degree in marketing.

She is married to former San Francisco 49ers offensive tackle Joe Staley, with whom she has two daughters, Grace and Audrey.

== Notable Honors ==
First Team All American, Two-Time Big East Defender of the Year, NCAA College Cup Defensive MVP

== Career ==
=== College career ===
As a freshman at Notre Dame, Dew started all twenty-five games at center defender for the Irish, alongside teammate and Canadian international Candace Chapman.

After an ACL injury during her sophomore year, which caused her to miss all of the 2006 NCAA postseason games, Dew came back her in her junior year to anchor the central defense, guiding freshmen Lauren Fowlkes and Julie Scheidler, and junior transfer Elise Weber, to form an impressive defense that saw a 17-game unbeaten streak in 2007.

As co-captain of the team her senior year, Dew continued to be the backbone of an Irish defense that allowed just eight goals in 21 games in 2008, with 14 shutouts.

=== National Team career ===
Dew was a member of the fourth-place United States U-20 women's national soccer team that played at the 2006 FIFA U-20 Women's World Championship in Russia, alongside Notre Dame teammate Brittany Bock. Carrie was called into her first U.S. U-20 National Team camp in January 2006 and was a member of the U.S. U-20 National Team that competed at the ‘06 Under-20 World Championship (Aug 17 – Sept. 3; in Moscow and St. Petersburg, Russia). She also played for the U.S. Under-17 in 2003, the Under-16 National Team in 2002 and the U-19 regional team.

=== Professional career ===
Dew was the overall twelfth pick at the 2009 WPS Draft, going to the Bay Area's FC Gold Pride in the second round, with the possibility of playing as a center midfielder, as well as defender, for the Pride. She played at center defense alongside Rachel Buehler for the majority of the 2009 season. In 2010, Dew moved back up to midfield, replaced by none other than her former Notre Dame teammate Candace Chapman at center back.

She has the dubious distinction of being the first player to receive a red card in FC Gold Pride's history.

Carrie joins the Sky Blue FC for her third professional season, following a WPS Championship season with the FC Gold Pride. Dew was selected by FC Gold Pride in the second round (12th overall) of the WPS Draft and started both as a midfielder and center back for the Pride. She scored her first goal as a professional on April 11, 2009 against Sky Blue FC and looks forward to scoring many more now that she’s wearing blue.

=== High School / Youth Club ===
One of 20 players named to EA Sports High School All-America team for 2004-05, previously earning three NSCAA All-America honors (‘02-’04)… totaled 36 career goals and 25 assists in 107 starts from her defensive position while leading La Costa Canyon High School to pair of CIF state titles… repeated San Diego Union-Tribune honors for player of the year and all-academic first team, as senior captain (6G-4A for 17-4-1 team)… helped Mavericks earn national ranking all four seasons while winning conference and CIF state titles in both 2002 and ‘04… earned CIF all-state honors in final three seasons (first team in ‘04, ‘05)… named North County player of the year in 2003 and ‘04 (first team ‘03-’05)… earned all-section (first team ‘03-’05), all-conference and all-city (first team, ‘02-’05) honors in all four seasons… received team MVP and scholar athlete awards in 2004 and ‘05… presented with California Legislative Sports Award in 2004 and ‘05… named San Diego Hall of Champions athlete of the month (March ‘04)

Played 10 years for the San Diego Surf club and captained the Surf team that won 2003 U-16 national title… Won four state titles with the Surf (‘99, ‘01, ‘03, ‘05) and 2003 Region IV championship while earning runner-up in 1999 and 2001… Named MVP at 2002 Blues Cup Summer Tournament and two Surf Cups (2000 and 2004)… Played with the U.S. U-23 National Amateur Team in 2005… Won an ODP National Title with Cal-South in 2004 as a co-captain… Also captained the Region IV team.

=== Club statistics ===
Team	Season	League	Domestic League					Domestic Playoffs					Total				
Team	Season	League	Apps	Starts	Minutes	Goals	Assists	Apps	Starts	Minutes	Goals	Assists	Apps	Starts	Minutes	Goals	Assists
San Diego Gauchos	2006	W-League	1	1	90	0	0	–	–	–	–	–	1	1	90	0	0
Pali Blues	2008	W-League	4	0	59	0	0	0	0	0	0	0	4	0	59	0	0
		Total	5	1	149	0	0	0	0	0	0	0	5	1	149	0	0
FC Gold Pride	2009	WPS	17	17	1429	1	0	–	–	–	–	–	17	17	1429	1	0
		Total	17	17	1429	1	0	–	–	–	–	–	17	17	1429	1	0
Career Total		–	22	18	1578	1	0	0	0	0	0	0	22	18	1578	1	0
