= Fredericksburg Impact =

- Full name: Fredericksburg Impact
- Nickname: The Impact
- Founded: 2011
- Stadium: Battleground Athletic Complex
- Capacity: 750
- Chairman: (United States) Pete Cinalli
- Manager: (United States) Jen Woodie
- League: W-League
- 2013: 3rd, Northeastern Conference; Playoffs: DNQ

Fredericksburg Impact is an American women's soccer team, founded in 1995. The team is a member of the United Soccer Leagues W-League, the second tier of women's soccer in the United States and Canada. The team plays in the Atlantic Division of the Eastern Conference against the Dayton Dutch Lions WFC, D.C. United Women, Hampton Roads Piranhas, and Northern Virginia Majestics.

The team plays its home games at the Battleground Athletic Complex at the University of Mary Washington in the city of Fredericksburg, Virginia.

The team is a sister organization of the men's Fredericksburg Hotspur team, which plays in the USL Premier Development League.

== Players ==
=== Current roster 2012 ===
Note: Flags indicate national team as defined under FIFA eligibility rules; some limited exceptions apply. Players may hold more than one non-FIFA nationality.

No.	Pos.	Nation	Player
0	GK	USA	Nicole Pond
00	GK	USA	Melissa Pacheco
1	GK	USA	Karen Blocker
2	FW	USA	Michelle Wycinsky
3	MF	USA	Chelsey Haney
3	MF	USA	Kelsey Pardue
4	FW	USA	Emily Dale
5	DF	FRA	Sandra Matute
6	FW	USA	Jennie Krauser
7	DF	USA	Nicole Marks
9	FW	USA	Erin Liberatore
9	DF	SCO	Kirsty Meyer

No.	Pos.	Nation	Player
11	DF	USA	Julie Bizer
12	DF	USA	Leigh Cruz
13	MF	USA	Rebecca Fisher
14	DF	USA	Emily Parisi
15	DF	USA	Crystal Koczot
16	DF	USA	Ashley Herndon
18	MF	USA	Nicole Czaplicki
19	MF	USA	Kristen Lybert
20	DF	USA	Carter Blair
22	MF	USA	Kara Blosser
23	MF	USA	Cortlyn Bristol
23	MF	USA	Becca Wann

== Year-by-year ==
Year	Division	League	Reg. season	Playoffs
2011	2	USL W-League	5th, Atlantic	Did not qualify
2012	2	USL W-League	3rd, Atlantic	Did not qualify
2013	2	USL W-League	5th, Northeast	Did not qualify

== Coaches ==
- (United States) Jen Woodie (2011–present)

== Stadia ==
- Battleground Athletic Complex at University of Mary Washington 2011–present

== Average attendance ==
- 2011
- 2012
- All-Time:

== See also ==
- Fredericksburg Hotspur
