= West Virginia Illusion =

- Full name: West Virginia Illusion
- Nickname: Illusion
- Founded: 2008
- Ground: Fairmont State University
- Capacity: ????
- Chairman: (United States) Joe Dorini
- Manager: (United States) Joe Dorini
- League: USL W-League
- 2008: 9th, Atlantic Division
| Home colors | Away colors |

West Virginia Illusion was an American women's soccer team, founded in 2008, which is a member of the United Soccer Leagues W-League. The Illusion played in the Atlantic Division of the Eastern Conference. The team folded after the 2008 season.

The team played their home games in the stadium on the campus of Fairmont State University in Fairmont, West Virginia. The club's colors was black and white.

== Squad 2015 ==
Note: Flags indicate national team as defined under FIFA eligibility rules; some limited exceptions apply. Players may hold more than one non-FIFA nationality.

| No. | Pos. | Nation | Player |
|---|---|---|---|
| 0 | GK | USA | Andrea Kaminski |
| 1 | GK | USA | Megan Jessee |
| 2 | DF | USA | Kelsey Fowler |
| 3 | DF | USA | Haley Thaxton |
| 4 | FW | USA | Kendra Graber |
| 6 | DF | USA | Lindsey Noteboom |
| 7 | FW | USA | Megan Mischler |
| 8 | DF | USA | Megan Cecchini |
| 9 | DF | USA | Caroline Price |
| 11 | MF | USA | Taryn Conklin |
| 12 | MF | USA | Ashley Rees |
| 13 | DF | CAN | Nicole Mailloux |
| 14 | MF | USA | Marisa Kanela |

| No. | Pos. | Nation | Player |
|---|---|---|---|
| 15 | DF | USA | Christen Seaman |
| 16 | MF | USA | Michelle Molinari |
| 17 | MF | USA | Bailey Bryant |
| 18 | DF | CAN | Melissa Bigg |
| 19 | FW | USA | Kaitlin Parsons |
| 20 | FW | USA | Brittany Clark |
| 21 | MF | USA | Shayna Varner |
| 22 | FW | USA | Sydney Metheny |
| 23 | MF | USA | Kim Sykes |
| 24 | DF | USA | Jennifer Johannigman |
| 28 | DF | USA | Natalie Cocchi |
| 30 | MF | USA | Ashley Ramsey |
| 99 | MF | USA | Ashley Magruda |
| — | DF | USA | Jennifer Ball |

== Season-by-season record ==
West Virginia Illusion (USL W-League)
| Year | Regular season | | Postseason | | |
| Year | Record | Win % | Record | Win % | Result |
|---|---|---|---|---|---|
| 2008 | 1-13-0 | .071 | 0—0 | .000 | - |
| Subtotals | 1-13 | .071 | 0-0 | .000 | 0 championships |
