= Krista Davey =

American former professional soccer player

Krista Bobo
Personal information
- Full name: Krista Bobo
- Birth name: Krista Davey
- Date of birth: January 20, 1978 (age 48)
- Place of birth: Missoula, Montana, United States
- Height: 5 ft 6 in (1.68 m)
- Position: Winger

College career
Years	Team	Apps	(Gls)
1996–1999	North Texas Mean Green		

Senior career*
Years	Team	Apps	(Gls)
2000	Chicago Cobras		
2001	Washington Freedom	11	(0)
2002–2003	New York Power	37	(5)
2005	Richmond Kickers Destiny		
2006–2008	Atlanta Silverbacks		
- * Club domestic league appearances and goals as of 14:11, 5 November 2017 (UTC) ‡ National team caps and goals as of 14:11, 5 November 2017 (UTC)

Krista Bobo (née Davey; born January 20, 1978) is an American former professional soccer player. A pacey winger, she played for the Washington Freedom and New York Power in the Women's United Soccer Association (WUSA).

== Professional career ==
Bobo was the Washington Freedom's third round draft pick (23rd overall) ahead of the inaugural 2001 season of the Women's United Soccer Association (WUSA). In 2000 she had helped Chicago Cobras win the USL W-League championship, scoring in the penalty shootout win over Raleigh Wings in the final. She started one of her 11 Freedom appearances in 2001, serving one assist, before being waived at the end of the season.

At the waivers draft in December 2001, Bobo was selected by the New York Power who offered her a reserve team contract. She was elevated to the main roster in June 2002, when Sara Whalen suffered a serious knee injury. She started five of 20 2002 season appearances, scoring two goals and providing an assist. Versatile Bobo played on both flanks, as well as in defense and attack, and was kept on for the following season. In 2003 she scored three goals and served two assists in 17 games (five starts).

When Bobo was inducted to the North Texas Mean Green Hall of Fame in July 2005, she was playing W-League soccer for Richmond Kickers Destiny. In 2008 Bobo was playing for the W-League Atlanta Silverbacks when she was invited to attend pre-season training with new Women's Professional Soccer (WPS) franchise Sky Blue FC.

== Personal life ==
Krista is married to former professional soccer player Matt Bobo. As of 2016, she had three children and was resident in Waco, Texas.
