= Kristin Luckenbill =

American soccer player (born 1979)

Personal information
- Full name: Kristin Stewart Luckenbill
- Date of birth: May 28, 1979 (age 47)
- Place of birth: Paoli, Pennsylvania, United States
- Height: 5 ft 9 in (1.75 m)
- Position: Goalkeeper

College career
Years	Team	Apps	(Gls)
1997–2000	Dartmouth Big Green		

Senior career*
Years	Team	Apps	(Gls)
2001–2003	Carolina Courage	50	(0)
2005–2007	Vermont Lady Voltage	25	(0)
2006	Jitex BK		
2008	FC Indiana	11	(0)
2009	Boston Breakers	10	(0)
2010	Sky Blue FC	5	(0)

International career^{‡}
2004	United States	14	(0)
Medal record
Women's football
Representing United States
Olympic Games
Gold medal – first place	2004 Athens	Team competition
- * Club domestic league appearances and goals as of 07:57, November 8, 2009 (UTC) ‡ National team caps and goals as of 07:57, November 8, 2009 (UTC)

Kristin Stewart Luckenbill (born May 28, 1979) is an American professional soccer goalkeeper and Olympic gold medalist. She previously played for the Boston Breakers and Sky Blue FC of Women's Professional Soccer as well as the Carolina Courage of the WUSA. She is a former member of the United States women's national soccer team.

== Early life ==
Born in Paoli, Pennsylvania and attended Conestoga High School and Stratton Mountain School in Vermont. During her final year of high school she was named All-Conference, All-County, All-Region, All-State, Regional All-American and High School All-American. She was also named Pennsylvania High School Player of the Year.

=== Dartmouth College ===
Luckenbill attended Dartmouth College from 1997 to 2000, where she was a three-time NCAA All-American, four-time First Team All-Ivy League, Ivy League Rookie of the Year and Ivy League Player of the year. She helped lead Dartmouth to two Ivy League Championships and four straight NCAA Tournaments including an Elite Eight appearance in 1998. Luckenbill recorded a Dartmouth-record 29 career shutouts and is ranked second in career goals against average at 0.73.

== Playing career ==
=== Club ===
==== Carolina Courage ====
Luckenbill was drafted to play for the Carolina Courage in the WUSA in 2001. She was the starting goalkeeper for the Courage for most of her tenure, winning the Founders Cup Championship in 2002, earning WUSA Goalkeeper of the Year and First-Team All-League honors and starting in the WUSA All-Star Game. She was also nominated for an ESPY Award in 2003 for "Best Female Soccer Player".

Her professional career spanned until 2010, playing for Jitex (Sweden), the Vermont Voltage, FC Indiana, the Boston Breakers, and Sky Blue FC.

=== International ===
Luckenbill became a member of the United States women's national soccer team in 2004, and won an Olympic gold medal with the team in Athens. She finished her professional soccer career in the WPS, playing one season for the Boston Breakers and the following season for Sky Blue FC.

==== International career statistics ====
Nation	Year	International Appearances			
Nation	Year	Apps	Starts	Minutes	Shutouts
United States	2004	14	3	633	1
Career Total	1	14	3	633	1

== Personal life ==
Luckenbill graduated from Dartmouth College in 2001 with a Bachelor of Arts in geography. She announced her retirement from professional soccer after July 2010, to pursue a master's degree in business from the Darden School of Business at the University of Virginia. She graduated from Virginia with a Master of Business Administration in 2012.

Luckenbill now works as a management consultant at Heidrick & Struggles.
