= Tara Minnax =

Retired American soccer player

Personal information
- Date of birth: November 26, 1979 (age 46)
- Place of birth: Tampa, Florida
- Position: Forward

College career
Years	Team	Apps	(Gls)
1998–2002	Tennessee Volunteers	73	(18)

Senior career*
Years	Team	Apps	(Gls)
2003	Atlanta Beat		
- * Club domestic league appearances and goals

Tara Minnax is a retired American soccer player who used to play for the Atlanta Beat of the Women's United Soccer Association (WUSA). After the WUSA collapsed, Minnax signed with the Atlanta Silverbacks. Since retiring Minnax has taken to soccer coaching.
