= Nicola Davies (footballer) =

Welsh footballer (born 1985)

Personal information
- Date of birth: 28 December 1985 (age 40)
- Place of birth: Bangor, Gwynedd, Wales
- Height: 1.77 m (5 ft 9 1/2 in)
- Position: Goalkeeper

Youth career
- Menai Bridge Tigers

Senior career*
Years	Team	Apps	(Gls)
2000–2003	Bangor City Girls		
2003–2012	Liverpool Ladies		
2008	→ Fredericksburg Lady Gunners (loan)		
2011–2012	Rochdale		
2013	Chelsea	1	(0)
2013	Doncaster Rovers Belles	10	(0)
2014	Reading Women		
2017–2018	Doncaster Rovers Belles	5	(0)
2018–2019	Sheffield United	4	(0)

International career^{‡}
2002–2018	Wales	64	(0)
- * Club domestic league appearances and goals ‡ National team caps and goals as of 16:40, 14 November 2018 (UTC)

Nicola "Nikki" Davies (born 28 December 1985) is a Welsh former football goalkeeper who most recently played for Sheffield United Women. In 2013, she joined FA WSL club Doncaster Rovers Belles, after a long association with Liverpool Ladies and a short spell at Chelsea Ladies. Davies has represented Wales at senior level.

== Club career ==
Davies began playing for Menai Bridge Tigers' under-11 boys team. She joined Bangor City in 2000 and was the recognised first choice goalkeeper until she moved to Liverpool in September 2003. While with Liverpool, Davies won the Northern Premier Division in 2003–04 and 2006–07.

In 2009–10 Davies spent a period away from Liverpool while completing Royal Air Force training. She played for Rochdale in the 2011–12 FA Women's Premier League Northern Division to gain match fitness.

After playing for Liverpool in 2012, Davies was named FA WSL goalkeeper of the year. She also won 2012 RAF Sportswoman of the Year. She started the opening two games of the following season for Chelsea in outstanding form, but was then posted to Oman with the RAF, curtailing her campaign.

On the final day of the 2013 women's football transfer window, Davies signed for Doncaster Rovers Belles.

In 2014, Davies joined up with Welsh legend Jayne Ludlow at Reading F.C. Women competing in the newly formed FA WSL 2. She took another break from football in February 2015, to focus on her RAF career, then re-joined Doncaster Rovers Belles ahead of the 2017 FA WSL Spring Series. She announced her retirement from football in July 2019 after spending a season at Sheffield United, where she made four league appearances.

== International career ==
Davies represented Wales at U-14 and U-16 level. She also won eight caps at the U-19 level. Her debut for the senior side came against Canada in Lagoa, Portugal, in March 2002.

In August 2010, Davies played for Wales in 2011 FIFA Women's World Cup qualification games against Azerbaijan and Sweden. Her club was listed as RAF. Prior to this, her last game for Wales had been in March 2009 against Poland.

In November 2010, Davies was called up for a friendly against Bulgaria as a Liverpool player again.
