= Megan Manthey =

American soccer player

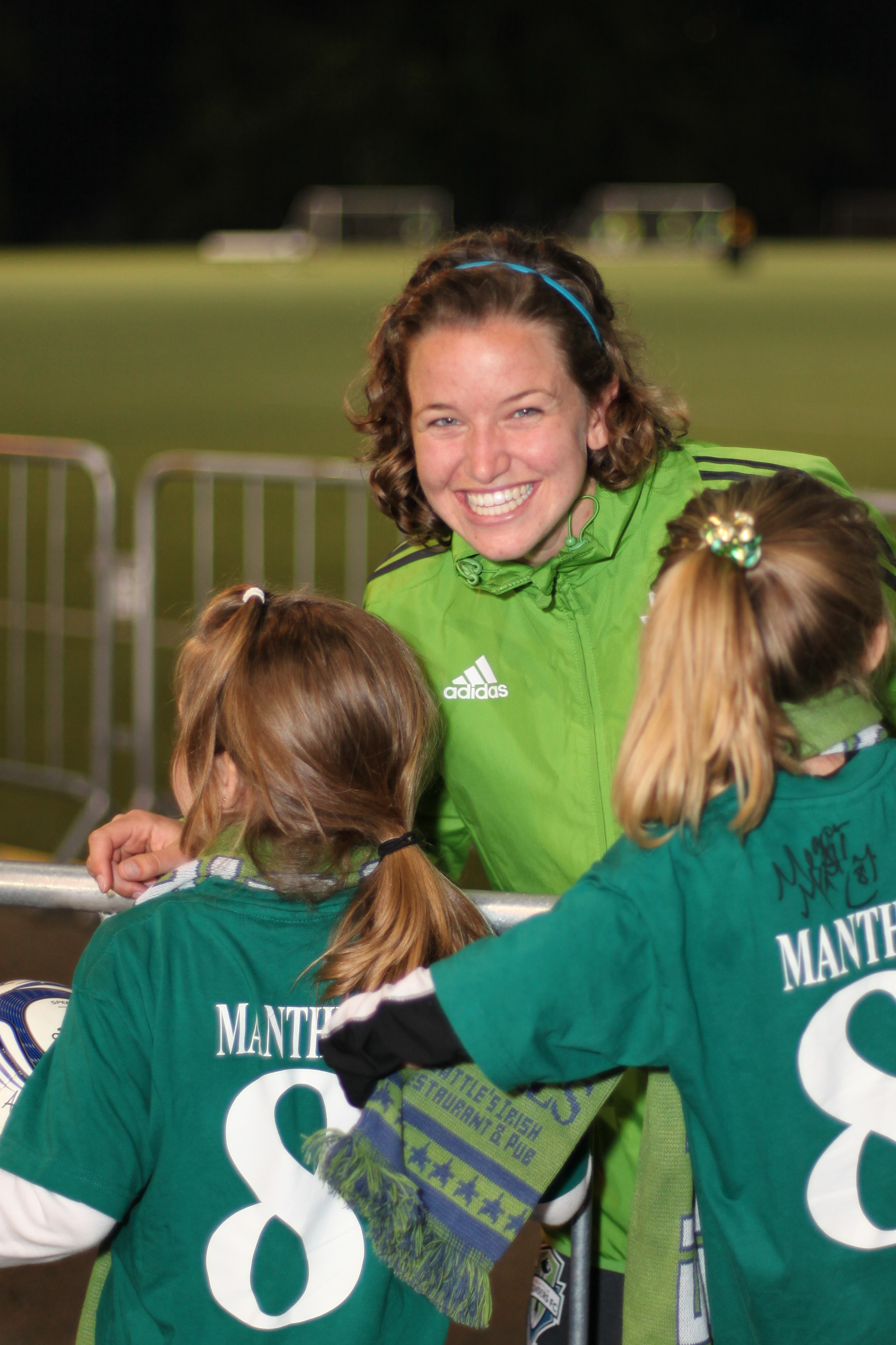
- Megan Manthey, 2012

Personal information
- Date of birth: July 22, 1988 (age 38)
- Place of birth: Ferndale, Washington, United States
- Height: 5 ft 7 in (1.70 m)
- Position: Forward

Youth career
- 2005–2006: University of Colorado
- 2007–2008: College of Charleston

Senior career*
Years	Team	Apps	(Gls)
2009–2012	Fortuna Hjørring	?	(?)
2012	Seattle Sounders Women	5	(2)
2012–2013	AS Saint-Étienne	8	(0)
2013	Stjarnan Women (Iceland)	8	(2)
2015	Seattle Sounders Women	?	(?)
- * Club domestic league appearances and goals as of 23 November 2013

Megan Manthey (born July 22, 1988) is a professional American soccer midfielder who has played for the Seattle Sounders Women of the United Soccer Leagues W-League among other teams in Europe, most recently Stjarnan, Iceland.

== Personal life ==
Megan's hometown is Ferndale, Washington. She played high school soccer at IMG Academy while attending The Pendleton School located in Bradenton, Florida.

== Soccer career ==
Manthey played with teams internationally in France and most recently in Iceland. She played with the Seattle Sounders Women for the 2012 season. Previously, Manthey played in 61 matches for Fortuna Hjørring in Denmark. Manthey helped Fortuna Hjørring to the Danish Championship in 2009, 2010, and 2011. She played Division I soccer for University of Colorado and College of Charleston. While with College of Charleston she was an All-Southern Conference selection. She scored 14 goals and 6 assists in 21 games for the 2008 season with the Cougars.
