= Amy Vermeulen =

Canadian soccer and ice hockey player

Personal information
- Full name: Amy Vermeulen
- Date of birth: November 23, 1983 (age 42)
- Place of birth: Rosetown, Saskatchewan, Canada
- Height: 5 ft 7 in (1.70 m)
- Positions: Midfielder; forward

College career
Years	Team	Apps	(Gls)
2001–2005	Wisconsin Badgers		

Senior career*
Years	Team	Apps	(Gls)
2006	Ottawa Fury	9	(4)
2006	Bälinge IF		
2008	Asker		
2008–2011	Vancouver Whitecaps	37	(5)

International career^{‡}
2001–2003	Canada U20	26	(4)
2006–2009	Canada	12	(1)
Medal record
Women's Football (soccer)
Representing Canada
Pan American Games
Bronze medal – third place	2007 Rio de Janeiro	Team
- * Club domestic league appearances and goals as of 04:21, February 15, 2012 (UTC) ‡ National team caps and goals as of 04:21, February 15, 2012 (UTC)

Amy Vermeulen (born November 23, 1983) is a female soccer player who played as a forward, who won the bronze medal with the Canadian women's national soccer team at the 2007 Pan American Games. She played with Vancouver Whitecaps. She played both soccer and ice hockey at Wisconsin.
