= Tessa Florio-Gavilsky =

American soccer player

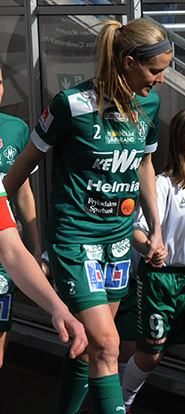

Personal information
- Full name: Tessa Jillian Florio-Gavilsky
- Birth name: Tessa Jillian Gavilsky
- Date of birth: July 20, 1989 (age 37)
- Place of birth: Clayton, Missouri, United States
- Height: 1.72 m (5 ft 8 in)
- Position: Forward

College career
Years	Team	Apps	(Gls)
2007–2010	Stetson Hatters		

Senior career*
Years	Team	Apps	(Gls)
2011	Kokkola Futis 10	6	(4)
2012	Mallbackens IF	15	(3)
2013	Ottawa Fury		
2013	IK Sirius Fotboll	10	(4)
2014–2015	Mallbackens IF	30	(3)
2016	Houston Dash	3	(0)
- * Club domestic league appearances and goals

Tessa Jillian Florio-Gavilsky (née Gavilsky; born July 20, 1989) is an American soccer forward. She played soccer at Stetson from 2007 to 2010.
