= Lusitano Stadium =

Stadium in Ludlow, Massachusetts

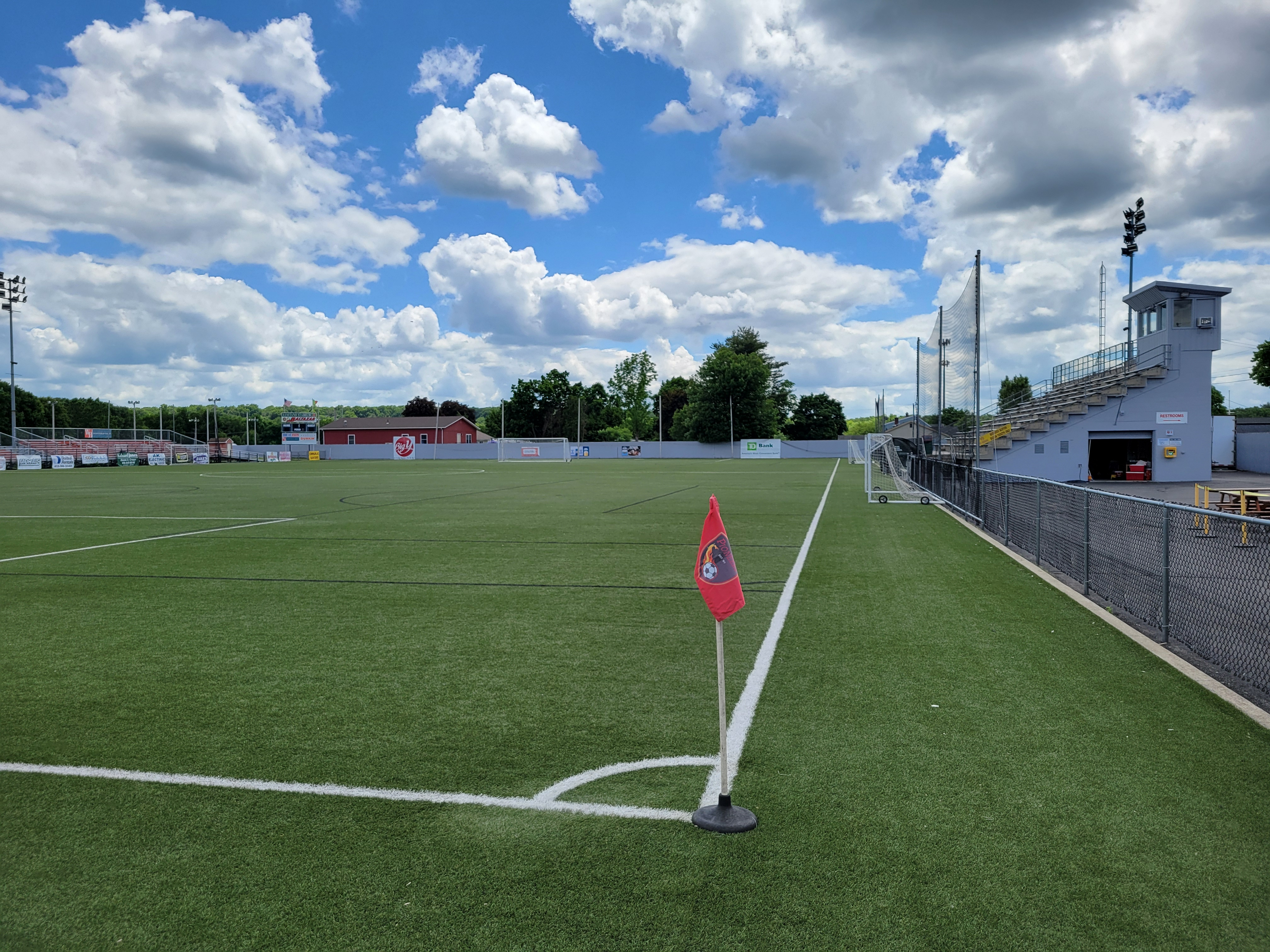
- Interactive map of Lusitano Stadium
- Location: 400 Winsor Street, Ludlow, Massachusetts 01056
- Coordinates: 42.1578841°N 72.4699509°W
- Owner: Gremio Lusitano
- Operator: Gremio Lusitano
- Capacity: 3,000
- Surface: ProGrass

Construction
- Opened: 1918

Tenants
- Ludlow Lusitano (1955-1958); Western Mass Pioneers (USL2) (1998-present); Ludlow High School (1955-1958) (1998-present)

Lusitano Stadium, located in Ludlow, Massachusetts, is a 3,000-seat stadium built in 1918 currently used for soccer. Currently its tenants are the Western Mass Pioneers of the USL League Two, the New England Mutiny of United Women's Soccer and the Western United Pioneers premier youth club

Between 2003 and 2005, New England Revolution played three games on the stadium.

The U.S. Open Cup has been played at Lusitano Stadium; 2004, 2005, 2008, 2014, 2015, 2017, 2018, 2022, 2024.

== Notable matches ==
Date	Teams	Match Type	Attendance	Notes
July 13, 2005	Chicago Fire FC (MLS) (Illinois) 3-1 (Massachusetts) Western Mass Pioneers (USL2)	2005 U.S. Open Cup; Third Round	3,124	
August 3, 2005	Chicago Fire FC (MLS) (Illinois) 3-2 (Massachusetts) New England Revolution (MLS)	2005 U.S. Open Cup; Fourth Round	3,866	
June 24, 2008	Richmond Kickers (USL2) (Virginia) 2-1 (Massachusetts) Western Mass Pioneers (USL2)	2008 U.S. Open Cup; Second Round		
March 21, 2024	Union Omaha (USL1) (Nebraska) 4-0 (Massachusetts) Western Mass Pioneers (USL2)	2024 U.S. Open Cup; First Round	317	

== Previous tenants ==
- Ludlow Lusitano (ASL) (1955–1958)
- Western Mass Lady Pioneers (W-League) (2004–2009)
