= Bradenton Athletics =

- Full name: Bradenton Athletics
- Nickname: The A's
- Founded: 2004
- Ground: IMG Soccer Academy
- Capacity: 1,500
- Chairman: (United States) Amanda Gatchel
- Manager: (United States) Derek Leader
- League: USL W-League
- 2008: 8th, Atlantic Division
Home colors	Away colors

Bradenton Athletics were a professional American women's soccer team based in Bradenton, Florida. The team was a member of the United Soccer Leagues W-League, then the premier women's soccer league in the United States and Canada, from 2004 to 2008, when they folded. They played in the Atlantic Division of the W-League's Eastern Conference. The head coach from 2004 until its end in 2008 was Derek Leader.

The team was associated with the IMG Soccer Academy, the United States Soccer Federation's full-time youth residency program, which itself is part of the larger IMG Academies organization initiated by tennis coach Nick Bollettieri in 1978. They played their home games at the IMG Soccer Academy's stadium in Bradenton. The team was a sister organization of the men's Bradenton Academics team, which plays in the USL Premier Development League. Their colors were blue, gold and black.

== 2008 roster ==
Note: Flags indicate national team as defined under FIFA eligibility rules; some limited exceptions apply. Players may hold more than one non-FIFA nationality.

No.	Pos.	Nation	Player
0	GK	USA	Annamarie Ditommaso
1	GK	USA	Shannon Aitken
3	DF	USA	Catherine Liebbrandt
4	FW	USA	Annie Stalzer
5	MF	USA	Madison Solow
6	MF	USA	Elizabeth Ruberry
7	DF	USA	Michaela Hornstein
8	MF	USA	Lauren Switzer
9	FW	USA	Erin Adams
10	FW	USA	Megan Manthey
11	DF	USA	Whitney Colburn
12	DF	USA	Jessica Bartol
14	FW	USA	Martha Hall

No.	Pos.	Nation	Player
15	MF	USA	Marissa Kazbour
16	DF	USA	Jessica Martinek
17	DF	USA	Kayla Sisco
18	MF	USA	Anna Kaye Logan
19	DF	USA	Caitlin Howard
21	MF	USA	Nicole DeJongh
23	DF	USA	Sarah Wagenfuhr
24	MF	USA	Erika Tymrak
—	MF	USA	Morgan Fragapane
—	GK	USA	Erica Lippitt
—	MF	USA	Amanda Morris
—	DF	USA	Brittany Putnam
—	MF	USA	Jessica Wolfe

== Year-by-year ==
Year	Division	League	Reg. season	Playoffs
2004	1	USL W-League	6th, Atlantic	
2005	1	USL W-League	6th, Atlantic	
2006	1	USL W-League	7th, Atlantic	
2007	1	USL W-League	6th, Atlantic	
2008	1	USL W-League	8th, Atlantic	Did not qualify
