= Sudbury Canadians =

- Full name: Sudbury Canadians
- Founded: 2004; 22 years ago
- Dissolved: 2006; 20 years ago
- Stadium: Cambrian College at Sudbury
- Capacity: 800
- Chairman: (Canada) Frank Malvaso
- Manager: (Canada) Emile Malvaso
- League: USL W-League
- 2006: 7th, Northern Division; Did not qualify to playoff
Home colours	Away colours

The Sudbury Canadians were a women's soccer team based in Sudbury, Ontario, Canada. The team played its home games in Cambrian College. They played only 3 seasons in the W-League. In its three seasons, the team relied predominantly on local talent. The team folded after the 2006 season but the other level programs continue.

Today, the Sudbury Canadians Soccer Club operates competitive teams of all ages and participates in the Sudbury Regional Soccer League and the Ontario Soccer Association (OSA). The club is dedicated to the promotion of young girls soccer.

== Staff ==
- General manager and President: Frank Malvaso
- Head Coach: Emile Malvaso

== Year-by-year ==
- See also: 2004 season
- See also: 2005 season
- See also: 2006 season

Year	League	Division	Reg. season	Playoffs
2004	USL W-League	North Central Division	5th	Did not qualify
2005	USL W-League	Northern Division	4th	Did not qualify
2006	USL W-League	Northern Division	7th	Did not qualify

== External news story ==
- Articles archive of Sudbury Sports.com, May 2004 to August 2007.
- Sudbury Canadians head to the U.S in Sudbury Stars newspaper.
- Soccer Scholarships - Northern Ontario players in OSA news bulletin, March 12, 2008.
- Sudbury Canadians player heads to NCAA in Northern Life.ca, March 9, 2011.
