= Maria Ilaria Pasqui =

Italian footballer (born 1979)

Ilaria Pasqui
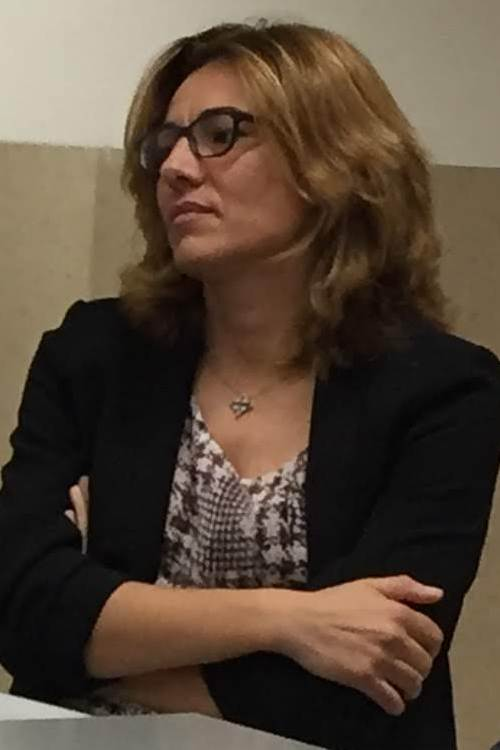

Personal information
- Full name: Maria Ilaria Pasqui
- Date of birth: 13 December 1970 (age 55)
- Place of birth: Castelnovo ne' Monti, Italy
- Height: 1.64 m (5 ft 5 in)
- Position: Striker

Senior career*
Years	Team	Apps	(Gls)
1996-1997	Bologna		
1998	Modena		

International career
2001-2005	Italy	37	(14)
- * Club domestic league appearances and goals

Ilaria Pasqui (born 13 December 1979) is an Italian former professional footballer who is in charge Inter Milan women's devolvement program.

== International career ==
Ilaria Pasqui was also part of the Italian team at the 2005 European Championships.
