= Shan Jones =

Welsh football player

Personal information
- Date of birth: 16 September 1990 (age 36)
- Position: Forward

International career
Years	Team	Apps	(Gls)
- Wales national team

Shan Jones (born 3 November 1990) is a Welsh footballer who played as a forward for Middle Tennessee Blue Raiders and the Wales national team. Jones also played for Caernarfon Town F.C..
