= Northern Virginia Majestics =

- Full name: Northern Virginia Football Club
- Nickname: Majestics
- Founded: 1998
- Dissolved: 2012
- Stadium: Hellwig Memorial Field Stadium
- Capacity: 1000
- Owner: Tim Schweitzer
- League: USL W-League
Home colours	Away colours

Northern Virginia Majestics was an American women's soccer team, founded in 1998 that played in the United Soccer Leagues W-League, the second tier of women's soccer in the United States and Canada in the Atlantic Division of the Eastern Conference. The team is the women's team of Northern Virginia FC, which plays in the USL League Two. They also operated teams in the Super Y League for youth. The team played home games at Hellwig Memorial Field Stadium in the city of Manassas, Virginia. The team's colors are gold, blue and white.

== History ==
Part of Northern Virginia FC, the Majestics were formed in 1998 as the women's senior team. They joined the USL W-League in 1999, joining the W-2 division, playing in the South Division. They played their home opener on May 8 against the Indiana Blaze. They had a difficult debut season, going winless, finishing with an 0–11 record. Like most teams in the division, their roster was made up of primarily high school and college players.

Over their thirteen seasons, the Majestics reached the W-League playoffs four times (2002, 2003, 2006 and 2007). On the youth side, Northern Virginia Majestics and male equivalent Northern Virginia Royals were named the fifth best Super Y-League club program in North America. In 2008, the Majestics were inducted into the USL Soccer Hall of Fame, as a 10+ Club, earning the honor for the longevity of their programs in North America.

The team ended its operations following the 2012 season, although they continued to operate their Super Y U20 program.

Several players earned All W-League First and Second Team selections and Players of the Week honors. In addition, player Elizabeth Baidu won W-League Rookie of the Year and coach Hank Leung won Coach of the Year (Hank Leung) in 2002. The Majestics also won Executive of the Year honors in 2000 and in 2011, with owner/general Tim Schweitzer. Schweitzer was also USL Soccer Hall of Fame under the Builder category in 2011 for his work with the Majestics.

== Year-by-year ==
The record for the Majestics in their seasons:

Year	League	Division	Record	Reg. season	Playoffs
1999	USL W-League	W-2	0-0-11	5th, South	Did not qualify
2000	USL W-League	W-2	5-2-5	3rd, Atlantic	Did not qualify
2001	USL W-League	W-2	4-4-1	3rd Eastern	Did not qualify
2002	USL W-League		9-0-5	2nd, Atlantic	Divisional Round
2003	USL W-League		5-0-7	3rd, Atlantic	Conference semi-finals
2004	USL W-League		2-1-11	6th, Atlantic	Did not qualify
2005	USL W-League		5-0-9	6th, Atlantic	Did not qualify
2006	USL W-League		5-0-9	5th, Northeast	Divisional round
2007	USL W-League		7-1-6	3rd, Northeast	Conference semi-finals
2008	USL W-League		3-5-6	6th, Northeast	Did not qualify
2009	USL W-League		1-1-10	6th, Atlantic	Did not qualify
2010	USL W-League		2-0-8	5th, Atlantic	Did not qualify
2011	USL W-League		0-1-9	6th, Atlantic	Did not qualify
2012	USL W-League		2-1-9	4th, Atlantic	Did not qualify

== Notable former players ==
- (United States) Ali Krieger
- (Ghana) Elizabeth Baidu
- (Ghana) Alberta Sackey
- (Ghana) Adjoa Bayor
- (Ghana) Basilea Amoah-Tetteh
