= Western Mass Lady Pioneers =

- Full name: Western Mass Lady Pioneers
- Nickname: Pioneers
- Founded: 2004
- Ground: Lusitano Stadium
- Capacity: 3,000
- Chairman: (Portugal) Celso Correia
- Manager: (United States) Chris Mogavero
- League: USL W-League
- 2008: 6th, Northern Division
Home colors	Away colors

Western Mass Lady Pioneers were an American women's soccer team, founded in 2004. The team was a member of the United Soccer Leagues W-League, the second tier of women's soccer in the United States and Canada. The team played in the Northeast Division of the Eastern Conference. The team folded after the 2009 season.

The team played its home games at Lusitano Stadium in the city of Ludlow, Massachusetts. The team's colours was black, white and red.

The team was a sister organization of the men's Western Mass Pioneers team, which plays in the USL Second Division.

== Players ==
=== Squad 2015 ===
Note: Flags indicate national team as defined under FIFA eligibility rules; some limited exceptions apply. Players may hold more than one non-FIFA nationality.

No.	Pos.	Nation	Player
0	GK	USA	Brianna Butcher
1	GK	AUS	Erin Herd
2	DF	USA	Mary Bircher
4	FW	USA	Joanna Haqq
5	FW	USA	Carolyn Rivett
6	MF	USA	Amanda Markham
7	MF	USA	Kacey Busque
8	MF	USA	Samantha Fortier
10	FW	BRA	Elaine Fontes
11	MF	USA	Brooke Johns
12	DF	USA	Rachel Richards
13	MF	USA	Meagan Belanger

No.	Pos.	Nation	Player
14	DF	ENG	Karen Ray
15	DF	NZL	Hannah Bromley
18	MF	USA	Holly Tyser
20	MF	USA	Therese Smith
23	DF	USA	Carlene Holness
24	DF	USA	Jillian Kusek
25	MF	USA	Ariel Werbicki
—	MF	USA	Cassandra Ashwell
—	GK	USA	Katherine Delude
—	MF	USA	Lauren Francisco
—	MF	USA	Amanda Mundorf

== Year-by-year ==
Year	Division	League	Reg. season	Playoffs
2004	1	USL W-League	2nd, New England	
2005	1	USL W-League	4th, Northeast	Divisional Round
2006	1	USL W-League	2nd, Northeast	Conference semifinals
2007	1	USL W-League	8th, Northeast	Did not qualify
2008	1	USL W-League	6th, Northern	Did not qualify
2009	2	USL W-League	8th, Northeast	Did not qualify
