= Fredericksburg Lady Gunners =

- Full name: FC Fredericksburg Lady Gunners
- Nickname: The Lady Gunners
- Founded: 2006
- Stadium: Fredericksburg Field House
- Capacity: 1,000
- Chairman: (United States) Brian Shumate
- Manager: (United States) Gerry Austin
- League: USL W-League
- 2008: 9th, Northeast Division
Home colours	Away colours

Fredericksburg Lady Gunners was an American women's soccer team, founded in 2006. The team is a member of the United Soccer Leagues W-League, and played in the Northeast Division of the Eastern Conference. The team folded after the 2009 season.

The team played their home games at the Fredericksburg Field House in the city of Fredericksburg, Virginia, 52 miles south-west of Washington, D.C. The club's colors were dark blue, red and white.

The team was a sister organization of the men's Fredericksburg Gunners team, which plays in the USL Premier Development League.

== 2008 Roster ==
Note: Flags indicate national team as defined under FIFA eligibility rules; some limited exceptions apply. Players may hold more than one non-FIFA nationality.

No.	Pos.	Nation	Player
0	GK	USA	Jessica Chisley
1	GK	WAL	Nicola Davies
2	DF	USA	Kallen Forster
3	FW	USA	Kara Blosser
4	MF	USA	Gabrielle Tinner
5	DF	USA	Victoria Byrd
6	DF	USA	Alix Stalnaker
7	MF	USA	Mackenzie King
8	FW	USA	Kylie Hayes
9	MF	USA	Theresa DeLucca
10	MF	USA	Leslie Cabe
11	FW	USA	Amanda Barasha

No.	Pos.	Nation	Player
12	MF	USA	Leigh Anthony
13	DF	USA	Tiffany Azzarito
14	MF	USA	Patricia Benner
15	DF	TRI	Maria Mohammed
17	FW	USA	Brittany Moseley
18	FW	USA	Shannon Dougherty
19	MF	TRI	Marissa Mohammed
20	FW	USA	Emily Cheshro
21	DF	USA	Nicole Moore
23	MF	USA	Anne Houliston
—	MF	USA	Lauren Bell
—	FW	USA	Omolyn Davis

== Year-by-year ==
Year	Division	League	Reg. season	Playoffs
2007	1	USL W-League	7th, Atlantic	
2008	1	USL W-League	9th, Northeast	Did not qualify

== Coaches ==
- (United States) Gerry Austin 2008–2009

== Stadia ==
- Fredericksburg Field House, Fredericksburg, Virginia 2008-2009
