= Carolina Dynamo (W-League) =

- Full name: Carolina Dynamo
- Nickname: The Dynamo
- Founded: 2008
- Dissolved: 2008
- Stadium: Macpherson Stadium
- Capacity: 3,000
- Chairman: (England) Neil Macpherson
- Manager: (United States) Art Rex
- League: USL W-League
- 2008: 7th, Atlantic Division
Home colours	Away colours

Carolina Dynamo was an American women's soccer team, founded in 2008, which was a member of the United Soccer Leagues USL W-League. The Dynamo played in the Atlantic Division of the Eastern Conference. The team folded after the 2008 season.

The Dynamo played home games at Macpherson Stadium in the city of Greensboro, North Carolina. The club's colors was red and white.

The team was a sister organization of the men's Carolina Dynamo team, which plays in the USL Premier Development League.

== 2008 roster ==
Note: Flags indicate national team as defined under FIFA eligibility rules; some limited exceptions apply. Players may hold more than one non-FIFA nationality.

No.	Pos.	Nation	Player
0	GK	USA	Lauren Brown
1	GK	USA	Laura Morse
2	DF	USA	Nancy Haskell
3	DF	USA	Caitlin Farrell
4	FW	USA	Callie Simkins
5	MF	USA	Ashley Rex
6	FW	USA	Carey Goodman
7	DF	USA	Caitlin Holmes
8	MF	USA	Katie Andreski
9	MF	USA	Nikki Dumencich
10	MF	USA	Hailey Beam
11	FW	USA	Allyson Sadow
12	MF	USA	Kristina Hanley

No.	Pos.	Nation	Player
13	DF	USA	Camelyn Dillon
14	DF	USA	Mara Whichard
15	FW	USA	Ashley Church
16	MF	USA	Tessa Hall
17	DF	USA	Jamie Corti
18	DF	USA	Danielle Mayeaux
19	MF	USA	Taylor Rose Revito
20	MF	USA	Heather Mitrisin
21	DF	USA	Anna Benton
22	DF	USA	Nicole Labuda
23	GK	USA	Cassidy Powers
24	DF	USA	Rebecca Voss

=== Former notable players ===
- (United States) Kendall Fletcher
- (United States) Mara Whichard
- (United States) Jennifer Marsh

== Year-by-year ==
Year	Division	League	Reg. season	Playoffs
2003	2	USL W-League	5th, Atlantic	
2004	1	USL W-League	5th, Atlantic	
2005	1	USL W-League	8th, Atlantic	
2006	1	USL W-League	8th, Atlantic	
2007	1	USL W-League	on hiatus	
2008	1	USL W-League	7th, Atlantic	Did not qualify
