= Vermont Lady Voltage =

- Full name: Vermont Lady Voltage Soccer Club
- Nicknames: The Volts, The Amps
- Founded: 2005
- Stadium: Collins-Perley Sports Complex
- Capacity: 2,000
- Chairman: Bo Vuckovic
- Manager: Scott Mosher
- League: USL W-League
- 2008: 8th, Northern Division
Home colours	Away colours

Vermont Lady Voltage was a professional American women's soccer team, founded in 2005, which is a member of the United Soccer Leagues W-League. Voltage played in the Northern Division of the Central Conference. They play their home games at the Collins-Perley Sports Complex in the city of St. Albans, Vermont, 27 miles north of the state's largest city, Burlington. The team's colors are black and white, and gold and blue. The team was a sister organization of the men's Vermont Voltage team, which plays in the USL Premier Development League.

The team folded after the 2008 season.

== Notable former players ==
- (United States) Kristin Luckenbill
- (Scotland) Michelle Barr
- (England) Karen Burke

== Year-by-year ==
Year	Division	League	Reg. season	Playoffs
2005	1	USL W-League	3rd, Northern	Divisional Round
2006	1	USL W-League	5th, Northern	Did not qualify
2007	1	USL W-League	6th, Northern	Did not qualify
2008	1	USL W-League	8th, Northern	Did not qualify

== Attendances ==
Attendance stats are calculated by averaging each team's self-reported home attendances from Kenn.com https://kenn.com/blog/soccer/all-time-w-league-attendance/

- 2005: 622 (10th in W-League)
- 2006: 317 (18th in W-League)
- 2007: 287 (20th in W-League)
- 2008: 344 (21st in W-League)
