= San Diego Sunwaves =

- Full name: San Diego Sunwaves
- Nickname: The Sunwaves
- Founded: 2005
- Stadium: Torero Stadium
- Chairman: (United States) T.J. LaFlam
- Manager: (Italy) Elio Bello
- League: USL W-League
- 2007: 1st, Western Conference; Conference Finals
Home colours	Away colours

The San Diego Sunwaves were an American women's soccer team based in San Diego, California, that competed in the USL W-League. The team played its home games at Torero Stadium on the grounds of the University of San Diego. The Sunwaves were founded in 2005, the team played for three years before folding in 2007. The team's colors were blue, red and white.

Prior to the 2007 season the team was known as the San Diego Gauchos Women, and was associated with the now-defunct men's USL Premier Development League franchise, the San Diego Gauchos.

== Final Squad ==
vs Seattle Sounders Women, 27 July 2007 Note: Flags indicate national team as defined under FIFA eligibility rules; some limited exceptions apply. Players may hold more than one non-FIFA nationality.

No.	Pos.	Nation	Player
2	DF	USA	Lisa Gomez
3	MF	USA	Jayme Cargnoni
4	MF	ENG	Laura Cooper
5	MF	USA	Elaine Fontes
6	DF	USA	Kaitlin Miyake
7	MF	USA	Leigh Ann Robinson
8	DF	MEX	Ana Gutierrez
9	FW	MEX	Maribel Casteian-Dominguez

No.	Pos.	Nation	Player
10	FW	USA	Amy Epsten
11	MF	ENG	Deborah Brereton
14	DF	USA	Elizabeth Remy
16	MF	ENG	Holly Grogan
17	DF	USA	Beth McNamara
18	MF	USA	Rebekah Patrick
22	GK	MEX	Sophia Perez

== Year-by-year ==
Year	Division	League	Reg. season	Playoffs
2005	1	USL W-League	4th, Western	
2006	1	USL W-League	4th, Western	
2007	1	USL W-League	1st, Western	Conference Finals

== Honors ==
- USL W-League Western Conference Champions 2007
- USL Semifinals western Conference Playoffs

== Coaches ==
- (United States) Daniel Sinohui, Charlie Cleaves 2005-06
- (Italy) Elio Bello 2007
- Elio Bello 2007 Coach of the year award

General Manager Charlie Cleaves 2006 Chairman Elio Bello 2007-2010

== Stadia ==
- Stadium at Sweetwater High School, National City, California 2005
- Stadium at Steele Canyon High School, Spring Valley, California 2005 (1 game)
- Torero Stadium, San Diego, California 2006-07
- Stadium at Southwestern College, Chula Vista, California 2006-07 (2 games)
- Balboa Stadium, San Diego, California 2006 (2 games)
- Stadium at Otay Ranch High School, Chula Vista, California 2006 (1 game)
