= Kalamazoo Outrage (W-League) =

Kalamazoo Outrage Women
- Full name: Kalamazoo Outrage Women
- Nickname: Outrage
- Founded: 2007
- Stadium: Loy Norrix HS Stadium
- Chairman: (United States) Doug Hammerberg
- Manager: (United States) Todd Wells
- League: USL W-League
- 2008: 6th, Midwest Division
Home colours	Away colours

Kalamazoo Outrage was an American women's soccer team, founded in 2007. The team was a member of the United Soccer Leagues USL W-League, the second tier of women's soccer in the United States and Canada. The team played in the Midwest Division of the Central Conference. The team folded after the 2010 season.

The team played its home games in the stadium on the campus of Loy Norrix High School in the city of Kalamazoo, Michigan. The club's colors was blue and white.

The team was a sister organization of the men's Kalamazoo Outrage team, which plays in the USL Premier Development League.

== Players ==
=== Squad 2009 ===
Note: Flags indicate national team as defined under FIFA eligibility rules; some limited exceptions apply. Players may hold more than one non-FIFA nationality.

No.	Pos.	Nation	Player
1	GK	USA	Meaghan Bennett
2	FW	USA	Sarah Rienzo
3	MF	USA	Tracy Yoshikawa
4	FW	USA	Brianna Hill
5	GK	USA	Erin Carlson
6	DF	USA	Brianna Roy
7	FW	CAN	Thalia Playford
8	MF	USA	Rachel Geilau
10	MF	USA	Megan Brown
11	MF	USA	Nicole Dulyea
12	MF	USA	Sarah Maxwell
13	MF	USA	Jackie Kondratko
14	DF	USA	Lauren Mayer

No.	Pos.	Nation	Player
15	FW	USA	Jennifer Gaylor
16	DF	USA	Emily Peterson
17	DF	USA	Ashleigh Carpentier
18	MF	USA	Sara Howland
19	DF	USA	Jenna Wenglinski
20	DF	USA	Chantal Robinson
22	MF	USA	Heather Currie
—	MF	USA	Emily Benoit
—	MF	USA	Shannon Carrier
—	DF	USA	Lauren Heyboer
—	DF	USA	Carmen Lequizamon
—	FW	USA	Jeannette Williams

== Year-by-year ==
Year	Division	League	Reg. season	Playoffs
2008	1	USL W-League	6th, Midwest	Did not qualify
