= Dayton Dutch Lions WFC =

Dayton Dutch Lions
- Full name: Dayton Dutch Lions; Women's Football Club
- Nickname: Dutch Lions
- Founded: 2011
- Ground: Dayton Outpatient Center Stadium; West Carrollton, Ohio
- Capacity: 3,000
- Owners: Erik Tammer; Mike Mossel
- Head Coach: Jacob Morrison
- League: USL W League
- 2016: Regular Season: 1st, Valley Conference; Playoffs: Regional Semi-Final
- Website: http://ddlfc.com/
Home colors	Away colors

Dayton Dutch Lions WFC is an American women's soccer team based in Dayton, Ohio, United States. Founded in 2011, the team plays in the Women's Premier Soccer League.

The team plays its home games at the Dayton Outpatient Center Stadium, on the campus of West Carrollton High School in nearby West Carrollton, Ohio. The team's colors are orange, white and blue.

== Year-by-year ==
Year	Division	League	Regular season	Playoffs
2011	2	USL W-League	3rd, Atlantic	did not qualify
2012	2	USL W-League	5th, Atlantic	did not qualify
2013	2	USL W-League	1st, Southeastern	Conference Final
2014	2	USL W-League	4th, Southeastern	did not qualify
2015	2	USL W-League	3rd, Southeastern	did not qualify
2016	2	WPSL	1st, Valley	Regional Semi-Final
2017	2	WPSL	4th, Valley	did not qualify
2018	DNP			
2019	2	WPSL	6th, Ohio Valley	did not qualify
2020	2	Season cancelled due to COVID-19		
2021	4	WPSL	5th, Group K	did not qualify
2022	4	WPSL	5th, Group I	did not qualify
2023	4	WPSL	5th, National Road	did not qualify
2024	4	WPSL	5th, Gateway	did not qualify
2025	2	USL W-League	5th, Group O	did not qualify
2026	2	USL W-League	3rd, Valley	did not qualify

== Owners, staff and players ==
=== Notable Former Professional, Amateur and Academy Players ===
- (United States) Rose Lavelle selected as the #1 pick (Round 1, Pick 1) at the 2017 NWSL College Draft by the Boston Breakers; signed in 2017 by the Breakers. Currently with Gotham FC.
- Emillie Fillion signed in 2013 by FC Twente in the BeNe League in the Netherlands winning the championship; signed 2014 by MSV Duisburg (women) in the Frauen Bundesliga in Germany.
- (Guyana) Brittany Persaud signed in 2012 by ADO Den Haag in the BeNe League in the Netherlands; signed 2013 by Alkmaar in the same league in the Netherlands .
