= Richmond Kickers Destiny =

- Full name: Richmond Kickers Destiny
- Nickname: Destiny
- Founded: 2004
- Dissolved: 2009
- Stadium: Sports Backers Stadium
- Capacity: 3,250
- Chairman: (United States) Tom Depcrynski
- Manager: (United States) Jen Woodie
- League: USL W-League
Home colours	Away colours

Richmond Kickers Destiny was an American women's soccer team, founded in 2004. The team was a member of the United Soccer Leagues W-League, the second tier of women's soccer in the United States and Canada. The team played in the Atlantic Division of the Eastern Conference. The Richmond Kickers folded the Destiny after the 2009 season in a cost-cutting move.

The team played its home games at Sports Backers Stadium in the city of Richmond, Virginia, and also occasionally at University of Richmond Stadium, and the former First Market Stadium (now known as Robins Stadium). The team's colors were red, white and black.

The team was a sister organization of the men's Richmond Kickers of the USL PRO league, and Richmond Kickers Future, which played in the USL Premier Development League until 2008.

== Players ==
=== Notable former players ===
- (United States) Chantel Jones
- (United States) Nikki Krzysik
- (United States) Becky Sauerbrunn
- (United States) April Price

== Year-by-year ==
Year	Division	League	Reg. season	Playoffs
2004	1	USL W-League	4th, Atlantic	
2005	1	USL W-League	5th, Atlantic	
2006	1	USL W-League	2nd, Atlantic	Conference finals
2007	1	USL W-League	2nd, Atlantic	Conference semifinals
2008	1	USL W-League	6th, Atlantic	Did not qualify
2009	2	USL W-League	7th, Atlantic	Did not qualify
