= Minnesota Lightning =

- Full name: Minnesota Lightning
- Nickname: Lightning
- Founded: 2006
- Dissolved: 2009
- Stadium: National Sports Center
- Capacity: 12,000
- Chairman: (United States) Djorn Buchholz
- Manager: (United States) Danny Storlien
- League: USL W-League
- 2009: 3rd, Midwest Division
| Home colours | Away colours |

Minnesota Lightning was an American women's soccer team, founded in 2006. The team was a member of the United Soccer Leagues W-League, the second tier of women's soccer in the United States and Canada. The team played in the Midwest Division of the Central Conference. The team folded after the 2009 season.

The team played its home games at the National Sports Center in the city of Blaine, Minnesota, 18 miles north of downtown Minneapolis. The team's colors were navy blue and pale blue.

The team was a sister organization of the men's Minnesota Thunder team, which played in the USL First Division. The Minnesota Thunder was suspended from the USL First Division after they left the USL for the new North American Soccer League.

== Year-by-year ==
| Year | Division | League | Reg. season | Playoffs |
|---|---|---|---|---|
| 2006 | 1 | USL W-League | 2nd, Midwest | Conference Semifinals |
| 2007 | 1 | USL W-League | 1st, Midwest | Conference Finals |
| 2008 | 1 | USL W-League | 3rd, Midwest | Did not qualify |
| 2009 | 2 | USL W-League | 3rd, Midwest | Did not qualify |

== Honors ==
- USL W-League Midwest Division Champions 2007

== See also ==
- Minnesota Lynx
- Minnesota Whitecaps
- Minnesota Vixen
