= Fort Wayne Fever (W-League) =

- Full name: Fort Wayne Fever
- Nickname: Fever
- Founded: 2004
- Stadium: Hefner Stadium
- Capacity: 2,000
- Chairman: (United States) Tom Lapsley
- Manager: (United States) Bobby Poursanidis
- League: USL W-League
- 2008: 7th, Midwest Division
Home colours	Away colours

Fort Wayne Fever was an American women's soccer team, founded in 2004. The team was a member of the United Soccer Leagues USL W-League, the second tier of women's soccer in the United States and Canada. The team plays in the Midwest Division of the Central Conference. The team folded after the 2009 season.

The team played its home games at Hefner Stadium in Fort Wayne, Indiana. The team's colors was white and black.

The team was a sister organization of the men's Fort Wayne Fever team, which plays in the USL Premier Development League.

== Players ==
=== Squad 2009 ===
Note: Flags indicate national team as defined under FIFA eligibility rules; some limited exceptions apply. Players may hold more than one non-FIFA nationality.

No.	Pos.	Nation	Player
1	GK	USA	Elizabeth Hake
3	FW	USA	Blair Sorg
4	MF	USA	Sarah Killion
6	MF	USA	Miranda Graham
7	FW	USA	Claire Ward
8		USA	Kala Morgan
9	FW	USA	Jordan Pawlik
10	MF	USA	Gina Killion
11	DF	USA	Katie Tarrant
12	MF	USA	Emilie Huser
13	FW	USA	Chelsi McHenry
14	DF	USA	Eliana Sommer

No.	Pos.	Nation	Player
15	DF	USA	Margaret Allgeier
16	MF	USA	Sarah Kaufman
18	DF	USA	Julia Schneidler
19		USA	Rebekah Clay
20		USA	Katie Wilson
21	MF	USA	Madison Oyer
23	MF	USA	Ellen Jantsch
25	MF	USA	Paige Goeglein
—	DF	USA	Erin Beck
—		USA	Nicole Evans
—	GK	USA	Jaqueline Weiss
—		USA	Veronika Pribyslavska
—		USA	Rebecca Mondich

== Year-by-year ==
Year	Division	League	Reg. season	Playoffs
2004	1	USL W-League	2nd, Midwest	
2005	1	USL W-League	5th, Midwest	
2006	1	USL W-League	7th, Midwest	
2007	1	USL W-League	6th, Midwest	
2008	1	USL W-League	7th, Midwest	
2009	1	USL W-League	5th, Midwest	Did not qualify
