= Atlanta Silverbacks Women =

Former American women's soccer team

- Full name: Atlanta Silverbacks Women
- Nickname: The Silverbacks
- Founded: 2005
- Dissolved: 2016
- Ground: Atlanta Silverbacks Park
- Capacity: 5,000
- League: USL W-League (2005–2015); Women's Premier Soccer League (2016)
Home colors	Away colors

Atlanta Silverbacks Women was an American women's soccer team that played from 2005 until 2016. The team played in the USL W-League from 2005 until the league folded after the 2015 season. For the 2016 season they played in the Women's Premier Soccer League. They won the W-League championship in 2011 and the WPSL Southeast championship in 2016.

The team played its home games at Atlanta Silverbacks Park, a soccer-specific stadium in Chamblee, Georgia, 15 miles northeast of downtown Atlanta. The team's colors were red and black.

== Players ==
=== 2015 roster ===
Note: Flags indicate national team as defined under FIFA eligibility rules; some limited exceptions apply. Players may hold more than one non-FIFA nationality.

No.	Pos.	Nation	Player
1	GK	USA	Carolyn Campbell
3	MF	ENG	Stacey Balaam
4	DF	USA	Katherine Arias
12	DF	USA	Kansas Bayly
26	GK	USA	Morgan Beans
13	DF	USA	Jessica Binkowski
14	FW	BRB	Washida Blackman
17	DF	USA	Kristin Burton
2	FW	USA	Rachel Garcia
18	MF	CAN	Alexis Hastings
21	DF	USA	Leilani Huntley
7	FW	USA	Savannah Jordan
5	MF	MAR	Zineb Rechiche

No.	Pos.	Nation	Player
6	DF	USA	Cecilia Marrero
8	FW	USA	Alexa Newfield
9	DF	USA	Kelsey Nix
24	GK	USA	Constance Organ
23	MF	USA	Jamie Pollock
15	FW	USA	Cherie Sayon
27	GK	USA	Jamie Simmons
19	DF	USA	Emily Sonnett
22	FW	USA	Lauren Tanner
11	MF	USA	Emmanuel Arteaga
25	FW	USA	Teegan Van Gunst
20	DF	USA	Annika Van Gunst
10	MF	USA	Allison Wetherington

=== Notable former players ===
- (Canada) Christine Latham
- (Canada) Candace Chapman
- (Canada) Sharolta Nonen
- (United States) Lyndsey Patterson
- (Canada) Melissa Tancredi
- (Morocco) Zineb Rechiche
- (United States) Michelle Betos
- (United States) Elizabeth Guess
- (United States) Ashley Phillips

== Year-by-year ==
Year	Division	League	Reg. season	Playoffs
2005	1	USL W-League	3rd, Atlantic	
2006	1	USL W-League	5th, Atlantic	
2007	1	USL W-League	1st, Atlantic	National Final
2008	1	USL W-League	1st, Atlantic	Conference Finals
2009	2	USL W-League	1st, Atlantic	Conference Semi-Finals
2010	2	USL W-League	1st, Atlantic	National Semi-Finals (4th Place)
2011	2	USL W-League	1st, Atlantic	Champions
2012	2	USL W-League	2nd, Southeast	Did not qualify
2013	2	USL W-League	3rd, Southeast	Did not qualify
2014	2	USL W-League	5th, Southeast	Did not qualify
2015	2	USL W-League	4th, Southeast	Did not qualify
2016	2	WPSL	1st, Southeast	Lost in first round

== Honors ==
- WPSL Southeast champions 2016
- USL W-League National Champions 2011
- USL W-League Atlantic Division Champions 2011
- USL W-League Atlantic Division Champions 2010
- USL W-League Atlantic Division Champions 2009
- USL W-League Atlantic Division Champions 2008
- USL W-League Central Conference Champions 2007
- USL W-League Atlantic Division Champions 2007
