= 2009 WPSL season =

Women's Premier Soccer League
- Season: 2009

The 2009 Women's Premier Soccer League season is the 12th season of the WPSL.

== Changes From 2008 ==
=== Name Changes ===
Two teams changed their name in the offseason.

Team name	Location	Previous name
Dallas Select	Lewisville, TX	Vitesse Dallas
Utah Starzz	Draper, UT	Utah Spiders

=== New Franchises ===
Ten franchises joined the league this year:

Team name	Metro area	Location	Previous affiliation
Alamo SC San Antonio	San Antonio area	San Antonio, TX	expansion
Bay State Select	Boston area	Hingham, MA	returned from hiatus
Boise Blitz	Boise area	Boise, ID	expansion
Carmel United SC	Indianapolis area	Carmel, IN	expansion
Clearwater Galactics Amazons	Tampa Bay area	Clearwater, FL	expansion
Portland Rain	Portland area	Portland, OR	expansion
PSSCV Santa Clarita	Los Angeles area	Santa Clarita, CA	expansion
Seattle Synergy	Seattle area	Seattle, WA	expansion
SoCal Rush	San Bernardino area	Victorville, CA	expansion
TC Maryland Pride	Baltimore area	Ellicott City, MD	returned from hiatus

=== Folding ===
Seven teams left the league prior to the beginning of the season:

- Albuquerque Lady Asylum
- Brevard County Cocoa Expos
- Colorado Springs United
- Massachusetts Stingers - previously on hiatus
- Northampton Laurels
- Orlando Falcons - previously on hiatus
- Sonoma County Sol

== Standings ==
As of July 6, 2009

=== Pacific Conference ===
==== North Division ====
Place	Team	P	W	L	T	GF	GA	GD	Points
1	California Storm*	11	9	1	1	42	7	+35	28
2	San Francisco Nighthawks	12	8	2	2	26	10	+16	26
3	Monterey Blues	12	6	6	0	20	19	+1	18
4	Portland Rain	12	4	6	2	17	18	-1	14
5	Walnut Creek Power*	11	4	6	1	11	24	-13	13
6	Seattle Synergy	12	3	6	3	12	37	-25	12
7	FC Sacramento Pride	12	3	8	1	12	22	-10	10

* California and Walnut Creek game postponed, not rescheduled since it would not affect standings.

==== South Division ====
Place	Team	P	W	L	T	GF	GA	GD	Points
1	Ajax America Women	14	12	1	1	46	7	+39	37
2	San Diego United	14	11	1	2	39	4	+35	35
3	San Diego WFC SeaLions	14	9	5	0	28	25	+3	27
4	Los Angeles Rampage	14	7	5	2	31	13	+18	23
5	Claremont Stars	14	4	7	3	9	21	-6	15
6	West Coast FC	14	4	8	2	30	11	+19	5
7	SoCal Rush	14	2	12	0	9	47	-28	6
8	PSSCV Santa Clarita	14	1	13	0	4	58	-54	3

=== Big Sky Conference ===
==== North Division ====
Place	Team	P	W	L	T	GF	GA	GD	Points
1	Arizona Rush	12	10	2	0	26	6	+20	30
2	Salt Lake City Sparta*	11	8	2	1	13	9	+4	25
3	Denver Diamonds	12	4	5	3	10	19	-9	15
4	Utah Starzz*	11	4	5	2	8	12	-4	14
5	Boise Blitz FC	12	0	12	0	0	12	-12	0

==== South Division ====
Place	Team	P	W	L	T	GF	GA	GD	Points
1	Dallas Premier	10	9	0	1	39	12	+27	28
2	Oklahoma Alliance	8	5	2	1	14	11	+3	16
3	Alamo SC San Antonio	7	2	3	2	11	22	-11	8
4	Tulsa Spirit	6	1	3	2	11	10	+1	5
5	South Select	10	1	7	2	11	22	-11	5
6	Fort Worth	7	1	5	1	7	16	-9	4

=== Sunshine Conference ===
Place	Team	P	W	L	T	GF	GA	GD	Points
1	Miami Kickers	10	7	1	2	37	12	+25	23
2	Florida Surge	10	6	2	2	22	6	+16	20
3	Palm Beach United	10	5	3	2	19	13	+6	17
4	Clearwater Galactics Amazons*	9	4	1	4	21	8	+13	16
5	Puerto Rico Capitals*	9	1	7	1	12	32	-20	4
6	Thomasville Dragons	10	0	9	1	5	46	-41	1

=== Midwest Conference ===
Place	Team	P	W	L	T	GF	GA	GD	Points
1	Ohio Premier Women	8	8	0	0	29	2	+27	24
2	Carmel United FC	6	2	4	0	18	13	+5	6
3	Chicago United Breeze	5	1	4	0	2	13	-11	3
4	FC St. Louis	4	1	3	0	6	20	-14	3
5	FC Twente3	1	0	1	0	0	7	-7	0

=== East Conference ===
Place	Team	P	W	L	T	GF	GA	GD	Points
1	Boston Aztec Women	10	9	0	1	30	4	+26	28
2	Long Island Fury	10	9	0	1	26	9	+17	28
3	Lancaster Inferno	10	7	1	2	23	9	+14	23
4	Adirondack Lynx	10	7	3	0	24	15	+9	21
5	Millburn Magic	10	5	4	1	16	16	0	16
6	Philadelphia Liberty	10	5	5	0	15	19	-4	15
7	Bay State Select	10	4	5	1	17	23	-6	13
8	New England Mutiny	10	4	6	0	19	14	+5	12
9	New York Athletic Club	10	4	6	0	15	20	-5	12
10	TSC Maryland Pride	10	3	5	2	14	16	-2	11
11	Atlantic City Diablos	10	3	5	2	8	14	-6	11
12	SoccerPlus Connecticut	10	3	6	1	15	17	-2	10
13	Central Delaware SA Future	10	1	9	0	7	27	-20	3
14	Maine Tide	10	0	9	1	3	29	-26	1

== Playoffs ==
=== Eastern Conference ===
Eastern Quarterfinals
E2	(New York (state)) Long Island Fury	4
E7	(Pennsylvania) Philadelphia Liberty	0
E4	(New York (state)) Adirondack Lynx	1
E5	(Massachusetts) New England Mutiny	4
E1	(Massachusetts) Boston Aztec Women	1
E8	(Pennsylvania) Lancaster Inferno	3
E3	(New Jersey) Millburn Magic	2
E6	(Massachusetts) Bay State Select	0

Eastern Semifinals
E2	(New York (state)) Long Island Fury	2
E5	(Massachusetts) New England Mutiny	0
E8	(Pennsylvania) Lancaster Inferno (AET/PSO)	2 (4)
E3	(New Jersey) Millburn Magic	2 (5)

Eastern Finals
E2	(New York (state)) Long Island Fury	3
E3	(New Jersey) Millburn Magic	0

=== Big Sky Conference ===
Big Sky Finals
BN1	Arizona Rush (AET)	2
BS1	(Texas) Dallas Premier	3

=== Midwest/Sunshine Conferences ===
Midwest/Sunshine
SS	(Florida) Miami Kickers	2
MW	Ohio Premier Women	0

=== Pacific Conference ===
Pacific Semifinals
PN1	California Storm	1
PS2	(California) San Diego United	0
PS1	(California) Ajax America Women	1
PN2	(California) San Francisco Nighthawks	0

Pacific Finals
PN1	California Storm (AET/PSO)	1 (5)
PS2	(California) Ajax America Women	1 (6)

=== WPSL Championship ===
WPSL Semifinals
E2	(New York (state)) Long Island Fury	3
BS1	(Texas) Dallas Premier	0
PS2	(California) Ajax America Women	5
SS	(Florida) Miami Kickers	0

WPSL Finals
E2	(New York (state)) Long Island Fury	1
PS2	(California) Ajax America Women	0
