= 2010 WPSL season =

Women's Premier Soccer League
- Season: 2010
- Champions: Boston Aztec (WPSL)
- Top goalscorer: Leah Blayney and Aneesa Patton (10)

The 2010 Women's Premier Soccer League season is the 13th season of the WPSL.

== Standings ==
End of 2010

=== Pacific Conference ===
==== North Division ====
Place	Team	P	W	L	T	GF	GA	GD	Points
1	California Storm	12	11	1	0	38	9	+29	33
2	North Bay FC Wave	12	9	3	0	28	9	+19	27
3	Spokane Black Widows	12	6	5	1	23	19	+4	19
4	Portland Rain	12	6	6	0	25	16	+9	18
5	Clovis Sidekicks	12	6	6	0	37	32	+5	18
6	San Francisco Nighthawks	12	3	8	1	23	28	-5	10
7	FC Sacramento Pride	12	0	12	0	5	60	-55	0

==== South Division ====
Place	Team	P	W	L	T	GF	GA	GD	Points
1	Ajax America Women	10	6	3	1	29	10	+19	19
2	LAFC Chelsea	10	6	3	1	23	11	+12	19
3	San Diego WFC SeaLions	10	6	3	1	19	11	+8	19
4	Claremont Stars	10	5	4	1	14	15	-1	16
5	SD United	10	3	5	2	16	14	+2	8
6	PSSCV - The Rooks	10	1	9	0	5	45	-40	3

=== Big Sky Conference ===
==== North Division ====
Place	Team	P	W	L	T	GF	GA	GD	Points
1	Phoenix Del Sol	8	5	1	2	11	2	+9	17
2	Arizona Rush	8	4	0	4	14	1	+13	16
3	Utah Starzz	8	3	2	3	7	4	+3	12
4	Salt Lake City Sparta	8	2	3	3	11	14	-3	9
5	FC St. George	8	0	8	0	3	25	-22	0

==== South Division ====
Place	Team	P	W	L	T	GF	GA	GD	Points
1	Oklahoma Alliance FC	8	7	1	0	26	4	+22	21
2	Fort Worth Panthers	8	4	3	1	13	8	+5	13
3	Dallas Premier	8	3	2	3	14	6	+8	12
4	Tulsa Spirit	8	1	5	2	4	30	-26	5
5	Houston South Select	8	0	4	4	4	13	-9	0

=== Sunshine Conference ===
Place	Team	P	W	L	T	GF	GA	GD	Points
1	FSA Freedom	8	5	1	2	19	6	+13	17
2	Brandon FC	8	4	3	1	11	10	+1	13
3	Miami Kickers FC	8	3	2	3	14	5	+9	12
4	Palm Beach United	8	3	2	3	6	11	-5	12
5	South Florida Strikers	8	0	7	1	3	21	-18	1

=== Midwest Conference ===
==== North Division ====
Place	Team	P	W	L	T	GF	GA	GD	Points
1	FC Milwaukee Nationals	8	7	1	0	28	6	+22	21
2	Chicago Eclipse Select	8	5	2	1	27	12	+15	16
3	Iowa Rush	8	5	3	0	20	12	-8	15
4	Madison 56ers	8	2	5	1	13	22	-9	7
5	KUFC Pursuit	8	0	8	0	6	58	-52	0

==== South Division ====
Place	Team	P	W	L	T	GF	GA	GD	Points
1	Ohio Premier Women	10	7	1	2	27	9	+18	23
2	Fort Wayne FC	10	7	1	2	25	10	+15	23
3	Classics Hammer FC	10	5	3	2	24	21	+3	17
4	St. Louis Scott Gallagher Elite	10	3	6	1	15	19	-4	10
5	Carmel United SC	10	3	6	1	13	22	-9	10
5	F.C. Metro Magic	10	0	8	2	9	33	-24	2

=== East Conference ===
==== Central Division ====
Place	Team	P	W	L	T	GF	GA	GD	Points
1	Long Island Fury	10	7	2	1	13	5	+8	22
2	Millburn Magic	10	5	4	1	21	15	+6	16
3	New York Athletic Club	10	4	5	1	16	15	+1	13
4	South Jersey United FC	10	3	5	2	6	18	-12	11

==== Mid-Atlantic Division ====
Place	Team	P	W	L	T	GF	GA	GD	Points
1	Lancaster Inferno	10	6	1	3	20	8	+12	21
2	Philadelphia Independence	10	6	3	1	26	19	+7	19
3	Chesapeake Charge	10	4	3	3	13	7	+6	15
4	Maryland Pride	10	3	4	3	18	18	0	12
5	Jersey Select	10	1	9	0	6	32	-26	3

==== Northeast Division ====
Place	Team	P	W	L	T	GF	GA	GD	Points
1	Boston Aztec	10	8	1	1	32	8	+24	25
2	Boston Aztec 23	10	8	1	1	22	7	+15	25
3	New England Mutiny	10	3	4	3	17	11	+6	12
4	CFC Passion	10	3	5	2	7	9	-2	11
5	Seacoast United	10	2	7	1	9	22	-13	7
6	Maine Tide	10	2	8	0	5	35	-30	6

== Playoffs ==
=== WPSL Championship ===
WPSL semifinals
E	(Massachusetts) Boston Aztec	2
MW	(Wisconsin) FC Milwaukee Nationals	1
Pac	(California) Ajax America Women	2
BS	Oklahoma Alliance FC	0

WPSL Finals
E	(Massachusetts) Boston Aztec	2
Pac	(California) Ajax America Women	1
WPSL consolation
MW	(Wisconsin) FC Milwaukee Nationals	2
BS	Oklahoma Alliance FC	2

==== Composite top 16 bracket ====
Regional semi-finals
(Massachusetts) Boston Aztec	2
(Massachusetts) Boston Aztec U23	1
(Pennsylvania) Lancaster Inferno	1
(New York (state)) Long Island Fury	2
(Wisconsin) FC Milwaukee Nationals (pen)	2(5)
Ohio Premier Women	2(4)
(Florida) FSA Freedom	1st
(Florida) Brandon FC	2nd
(California) Ajax America Women	3
(California) North Bay Wave FC	0
California Storm	3
(California) LAFC Chelsea	1
Oklahoma Alliance	1st
(Texas) Fort Worth Panthers	2nd
(Arizona) Phoenix Del Sol	1st
Arizona Rush	2nd

Regional finals
(Massachusetts) Boston Aztec	2
(New York (state)) Long Island Fury	1
(Wisconsin) FC Milwaukee Nationals	3
(Florida) FSA Freedom	1
(California) Ajax America Women	3
California Storm	0
Oklahoma Alliance	3
(Arizona) Phoenix Del Sol	0

National semi-finals
(Massachusetts) Boston Aztec	2
(Wisconsin) FC Milwaukee Nationals	1
(California) Ajax America Women	2
Oklahoma Alliance	0

National finals
(Massachusetts) Boston Aztec	2
(California) Ajax America Women	1
