= 2005 WPSL season =

8th season of the WPSL

Women's Premier Soccer League
- Season: 2005
- Champions: FC Indiana
- Longest winning run: California Storm
- Longest unbeaten run: California Storm Entire Season
- Longest losing run: Lamorinda East Bay Power

The 2005 Women's Premier Soccer League season was the 8th season of the WPSL. The league consisted of 20 teams split into 3 regional divisions.

FC Indiana finished the season as national champions, beating California Storm on penalty kicks after a 4-4 tie in the WPSL Championship game.

== Changes From 2004 ==
=== Name Changes ===
- San Diego WFC to San Diego WFC SeaLions
- Ajax of Southern California to Ajax America Women

=== New Franchises ===
- FC Indiana
- Houston Stars
- Everton FC America
- St. Louis Archers
- Bay State Select
- Philadelphia Pirates
- Boston-North Aztecs

=== Folding ===
- Northern California Blues
- Central California Gold
- Rochester Reign

=== Hiatus ===
- Denver Diamonds

== Final standings ==
Purple indicates division title clinched

=== West Division ===
Place	Team	P	W	L	T	GF	GA	GD	Points
1	California Storm	14	13	0	1	45	7		40
2	Ajax America Women	14	12	2	0	42	14		36
3	Utah Spiders	14	7	5	2	26	22		23
4	San Diego WFC SeaLions	14	5	9	0	26	24		15
5	Elk Grove Pride	14	4	7	3	22	22		15
6	Las Vegas Tabagators	14	4	6	3	21	34		15
7	San Francisco Nighthawks	14	3	10	1	11	45		10
8	Lamorinda East Bay Power	14	1	9	4	15	42		7

=== Central Division ===
Place	Team	P	W	L	T	GF	GA	GD	Points
1	FC Indiana	4	4	0	0	20	3		12
2	Houston Stars	6	2	2	2	10	17		8
3	Everton FC America	4	0	2	2	6	8		2
4	St. Louis Archers	2	0	2	0	1	9		0

=== East Division ===
Place	Team	P	W	L	T	GF	GA	GD	Points
1	New England Mutiny	13	13	0	0	37	7		39
2	Steel City Sparks	13	7	3	3	28	22		24
3	Bay State Select	13	7	5	1	29	17		22
4	Philadelphia Pirates	13	5	5	3	18	25		18
5	Massachusetts Stingers	14	3	5	6	20	19		15
6	Rhode Island Rays	11	2	5	4	13	19		10
7	Boston-North Aztecs	13	3	9	1	9	28		10
8	Maryland Pride	12	2	10	0	16	34		6

== Playoffs ==
=== Semi finals ===
California Storm 3-0 Steel City Sparks
FC Indiana 4-0 New England Mutiny

=== Third Place Playoff ===
New England Mutiny 2-1 Steel City Sparks

=== WPSL Championship Game ===
FC Indiana 4-4 California Storm (Indiana wins 4-3 on penalties)
