= 2008 WPSL season =

Women's Premier Soccer League
- Season: 2008

The 2008 Women's Premier Soccer League season was the 11th season of the WPSL.

Ajax America Women finished the season as national champions, beating Arizona Rush in the WPSL Championship game in Sacramento, California on 3 August 2008.

== Changes From 2007 ==
=== Name Changes ===
- Lamorinda East Bay Power changed their name to Walnut Creek Power

=== New Franchises ===
- Nineteen franchises joined the league this year:

Team name	Metro area	Location	Previous affiliation
Arizona Rush		Tucson, AZ	expansion
Brevard County Cocoa Expos		Cocoa, FL	returning from hiatus - previously in W-League
Fort Worth FC		Fort Worth, TX	expansion
Lancaster Inferno		Landisville, PA	expansion
Los Angeles Rampage		Granada Hills, CA	expansion
Maine Tide		Bangor, ME	expansion
Millburn Magic		Millburn, NJ	expansion
Monterey Blues		Monterey, CA	expansion
MYSC Lady Blues		Middleton, WI	expansion
Ohio Premier Women's SC		Dublin, OH	expansion
Oklahoma Alliance		Chickasha, OK	expansion
Puerto Rico Capitals		Caguas, Puerto Rico	expansion
Salt Lake City Sparta		Ogden, UT	expansion
San Diego United		San Diego, CA	expansion
South Select		Houston, TX	expansion
Thomasville Dragons		Thomasville, GA	expansion
Tulsa Spirit		Broken Arrow, OK	expansion
Vitesse Dallas		Duncanville, TX	expansion
West Coast FC		San Juan Capistrano, CA	expansion

=== Folding ===
- Five teams left the league prior to the beginning of the season:
  - FC Indiana—left to join USL W-League
  - Real Shore FC
  - River Cities FC
  - Rush Salt Lake City
  - Tampa Bay Elite
- In addition, four 2007 teams chose to spend the 2008 season on hiatus, with plans to return in 2009:
  - Bay State Select
  - Maryland Pride
  - Massachusetts Stingers
  - Orlando Falcons

== Final standings ==
Purple indicates division title clinched Green indicates playoff berth clinched

=== Pacific Conference ===
==== North Division ====
Place	Team	P	W	L	T	GF	GA	GD	Points
1	California Storm	10	10	0	0	48	3	45	30
2	Sonoma County Sol	10	6	3	1	17	13	4	19
3	San Francisco Nighthawks	10	4	3	3	18	12	6	15
4	Walnut Creek Power	10	4	7	0	12	24	-12	6
5	Sacramento Pride	10	2	8	0	11	44	-33	6
6	Monterey Blues	10	1	7	2	10	20	-10	5

==== South Division ====
Place	Team	P	W	L	T	GF	GA	GD	Points
1	West Coast FC	10	7	2	1	19	12	7	22
2	Ajax America Women	10	6	3	1	22	10	12	19
3	San Diego United	10	5	3	2	17	7	10	17
4	Los Angeles Rampage	10	4	5	1	11	16	-5	13
5	San Diego WFC SeaLions	10	4	5	1	11	16	-5	13
6	Claremont Stars	10	0	8	2	4	23	-19	2

=== Big Sky Conference ===
==== North Division ====
Place	Team	P	W	L	T	GF	GA	GD	Points
1	Utah Spiders	12	9	3	0	39	14	25	27
2	Arizona Rush	12	8	1	3	32	13	19	27
3	Albuquerque Lady Asylum	12	8	2	2	40	14	26	26
4	Denver Diamonds	12	5	5	2	25	25	0	17
5	Salt Lake City Sparta	12	4	7	1	19	27	-18	13
6	Colorado Springs United	12	3	8	1	11	33	-22	10

==== South Division ====
Place	Team	P	W	L	T	GF	GA	GD	Points
1	Oklahoma Alliance	8	7	0	1	22	6	16	22
2	Fort Worth FC	8	2	3	3	12	14	-2	9
3	South Select	7	2	3	2	10	11	-1	8
4	Tulsa Spirit	8	1	3	4	8	12	-4	7
5	Vitesse Dallas	7	1	5	1	5	15	-10	4

- Despite winning their division, Oklahoma Alliance did not take part in the WPSL playoffs.

=== Sunshine Conference ===
Place	Team	P	W	L	T	GF	GA	GD	Points
1	Brevard County Cocoa Expos	12	11	0	1	32	4	28	34
2	Palm Beach United	12	7	2	3	29	10	19	24
3	Florida Surge	12	7	3	2	24	15	9	23
4	Miami Kickers	12	6	6	0	38	18	20	18
5	Puerto Rico Capitals	12	2	5	5	4	13	-9	11
6	Thomasville Dragons	12	2	7	3	10	33	-23	9

=== Midwest Conference ===
Place	Team	P	W	L	T	GF	GA	GD	Points
1	MYSC Lady Blues	8	7	1	0	14	4	10	21
2	Ohio Premier Women's SC	8	6	1	1	19	4	15	19
3	FC St. Louis	8	4	3	1	13	11	2	13
4	Chicago United Breeze	8	2	6	0	7	15	-8	6
5	FC Twente3 IL	8	0	8	0	6	24	-18	0

=== East Conference ===
==== North Division ====
Place	Team	P	W	L	T	GF	GA	GD	Points
1	SoccerPlus Connecticut	12	12	0	0	53	2	51	36
2	New England Mutiny	12	10	2	0	46	7	39	30
3	Boston Aztec Women	11	4	4	3	19	18	1	15
4	Maine Tide	12	4	6	2	17	20	-3	14
5	New York Athletic Club	11	4	6	1	13	44	-31	13
6	Adirondack Lynx	12	2	8	2	17	37	-20	8

==== Mid-Atlantic Division ====
Place	Team	P	W	L	T	GF	GA	GD	Points
1	Long Island Fury	12	9	1	2	42	9	33	29
2	Lancaster Inferno	12	8	2	2	25	9	16	26
3	Atlantic City Diablos	12	7	3	2	27	9	18	23
4	Philadelphia Liberty	12	4	3	5	16	10	6	17
5	Millburn Magic	12	3	6	3	13	20	-7	13
6	Northampton Laurels	12	4	7	1	12	26	-14	10
7	Central Delaware SA Future	12	0	12	0	3	50	-47	0

== Playoffs ==
Conference Semifinals
PS1	(California) West Coast FC	3
PN2	(California) Sonoma County Sol	2
PN1	California Storm	0
PS2	(California) Ajax America Women	2
EN1	SoccerPlus Connecticut	2
EM2	(Pennsylvania) Lancaster Inferno	1
EM1	(New York (state)) Long Island Fury	2
EN2	(Massachusetts) New England Mutiny	4

Conference Finals
SU1	(Florida) Brevard County Cocoa Expos	0
MW1	(Wisconsin) MYSC Lady Blues	1
PS1	(California) West Coast FC	0
PS2	(California) Ajax America Women	2
BN1	Utah Spiders	2
BN2	Arizona Rush	6
EN1	SoccerPlus Connecticut	0
EN2	(Massachusetts) New England Mutiny	1

WPSL Semifinals
MW1	(Wisconsin) MYSC Lady Blues	0
PS2	(California) Ajax America Women	5
BN2	Arizona Rush	2
EN2	(Massachusetts) New England Mutiny	1

WPSL Championship
PS2	(California) Ajax America Women	3
BN2	Arizona Rush	1
