= 2011 WPSL season =

Women's Premier Soccer League
- Season: 2011
- Champions: Orange County Waves (WPSL)
- Top goalscorer: Nicole Wilcox 15 goals

The 2011 Women's Premier Soccer League season was the 14th season of the WPSL.

== Changes from 2010 ==
=== Folding ===
Maine Tide

== Standings ==
Blue indicates division title
Yellow indicates qualified for playoffs

=== Pacific Conference ===
==== North Division ====
Place	Team	P	W	L	T	GF	GA	GD	Points
1	Bay Area Breeze	10	8	1	1	24	7	17	25
2	North Bay FC Wave	10	6	1	3	22	10	12	21
3	California Storm	10	5	4	1	21	16	5	16
4	West Coast Wildkatz	9	4	3	2	14	11	3	14
5	San Francisco Nighthawks	9	1	7	1	8	31	-23	4
6	Clovis Sidekicks	10	1	9	0	13	29	-16	3

==== South Division ====
Place	Team	P	W	L	T	GF	GA	GD	Points
1	Orange County Waves	10	9	1	0	46	7	39	27
2	San Diego WFC SeaLions	10	8	1	1	33	11	22	25
3	Ajax America Women	10	5	4	1	13	18	-5	16
4	Los Al Vikings	10	2	6	2	10	20	-10	8
5	Los Angeles Premier FC	10	2	8	0	9	23	-14	6
6	Claremont Stars	10	2	8	0	10	36	-26	6

=== Big Sky Conference ===
The Big Sky regional playoffs were cancelled due to a high number of players returning to college.

==== North Division ====
Place	Team	P	W	L	T	GF	GA	GD	Points
1	Phoenix Del Sol	6	4	1	1	12	6	6	13
2	Utah Starzz	5	3	2	0	11	8	3	9
3	Salt Lake City Sparta	5	2	3	0	7	10	-3	6
4	FC St. George	6	1	4	1	8	14	-6	4

==== South Division ====
Place	Team	P	W	L	T	GF	GA	GD	Points
1	Oklahoma Alliance FC	11	10	1	0	46	6	40	30
2	FC Dallas	11	8	3	0	29	20	9	24
3	Fort Worth Panthers	12	7	4	1	19	14	5	22
4	American Eagles Soccer Club	13	4	6	3	7	24	-17	15
5	Arkansas Comets	11	3	7	1	16	22	-6	10
6	Houston South Select	11	3	7	1	12	24	-12	10
7	Tulsa Spirit	8	0	7	1	3	26	-23	1

=== Sunshine Conference ===
Place	Team	P	W	L	T	GF	GA	GD	Points
1	Tampa Bay Hellenic	12	10	1	1	32	9	23	31
2	Florida Sol FC	12	8	3	1	27	10	17	25
3	Gulf Coast Texans	12	8	3	1	25	11	14	25
4	Palm Beach United	12	5	6	1	15	17	-2	16
5	Brandon FC	12	5	7	0	15	26	-11	15
6	South Florida Strikers	12	2	10	0	13	34	-21	6
7	FSA Freedom	12	2	10	0	12	34	-21	6

=== North West Conference ===
Place	Team	P	W	L	T	GF	GA	GD	Points
1	Portland Rain	11	10	0	1	44	10	34	31
2	Spokane Shine	12	6	5	1	24	17	7	19
3	Oregon Rush	12	5	7	0	14	30	-16	15
4	Portland Rain U23	11	1	10	0	7	32	-25	3

=== Midwest Conference ===
==== North Division ====
Place	Team	P	W	L	T	GF	GA	GD	Points
1	Chicago Red Stars	9	8	1	0	35	3	32	24
2	FC Milwaukee Nationals	10	7	2	1	28	9	19	22
3	Chicago Eclipse Select	9	3	3	3	17	14	3	12
4	Minnesota Kings FC	10	3	6	1	9	30	-21	10
5	Madison 56ers	10	2	6	2	11	24	-13	8
6	Iowa Rush	10	2	7	1	10	29	-19	7

==== South Division ====
Place	Team	P	W	L	T	GF	GA	GD	Points
1	Ohio Premier Women	8	7	0	1	20	4	16	22
2	FC Indiana	8	5	2	1	13	10	3	16
3	Indiana United	8	4	4	0	16	16	0	12
4	Fort Wayne F.C.	8	3	5	0	17	18	-1	9
5	Classics Hammer FC	8	0	8	0	5	24	-19	0

=== East Conference ===
Boston Aztec U23 received a bye to the conference semifinals.

==== NorthEast Division ====
Place	Team	P	W	L	T	GF	GA	GD	Points
1	Boston Aztec U23	10	6	2	2	17	6	11	20
2	CFC Passion	10	6	2	2	15	10	5	20
3	Boston Aztec	10	5	2	3	25	12	13	18
4	New England Mutiny	10	4	3	3	10	10	0	15
5	SoccerPlus CT	10	3	5	2	10	14	-4	11
6	Albany Alleycats	10	3	6	1	9	23	-14	10
7	Seacoast United	9	1	7	1	8	20	-12	4

==== Mid-Atlantic Division ====
Place	Team	P	W	L	T	GF	GA	GD	Points
1	New York Fury	10	7	2	1	30	10	20	22
2	New York Athletic Club	10	6	2	2	27	10	17	20
3	Chesapeake Charge	10	5	1	4	13	12	1	19
4	FC Bucks	10	6	4	0	26	19	7	18
5	Long Island Fury	10	4	4	2	17	16	1	14
6	Chelsea Metro	10	4	5	1	11	20	-9	13
7	Penn Legacy Inferno	10	3	4	3	12	9	3	12
8	BuxMont Torch FC	10	2	6	2	7	19	-12	8
9	New Jersey Blaze	10	2	6	2	6	20	-14	8
10	Millburn Magic	10	1	6	3	10	27	-17	6

== Playoffs ==
Home teams listed second

=== Eastern Conference ===
Eastern Quarterfinals
NE3	(Massachusetts) Boston Aztec	1
MA2	(New York (state)) New York Athletic Club	0
NE4	(Massachusetts) New England Mutiny	1
MA1	(New York (state)) New York Fury	4
MA2	(Maryland) Chesapeake Charge	3
NE2	(Connecticut) CFC Passion	1

Eastern Semifinals
NE3	(Massachusetts) Boston Aztec	4
NE1	(Massachusetts) Boston Aztec U23	0
MA2	(Maryland) Chesapeake Charge	1
MA1	(New York (state)) New York Fury	0

Eastern Final
NE3	(Massachusetts) Boston Aztec	3
MA2	(Maryland) Chesapeake Charge	0

=== Big Sky Conference ===
The Big Sky regional playoffs were cancelled due to a high number of players returning to college.

=== Midwest/Sunshine Conferences ===
The planned final match, between the Midwest playoff champion and the Sunshine champion, was instead played as the national Semifinal as the winner would have played the Big Sky playoff champion in the semifinals.

Midwest semifinals
N2	(Wisconsin) FC Milwaukee Nationals	1
S1	Ohio Premier Women	0
S2	FC Indiana	0
N1	(Illinois) Chicago Red Stars	4

Midwest final
N2	(Wisconsin) FC Milwaukee Nationals	0
N1	(Illinois) Chicago Red Stars	4

=== Pacific Conference ===
Pacific semifinals
S2	(California) San Diego WFC SeaLions	3
N1	(California) Bay Area Breeze	2
N2	(California) North Bay FC Wave	0
S1	(California) Orange County Waves	1

Pacific final
N2	(California) San Diego WFC SeaLions	1(1)
N1	(California) Orange County Waves (pen.)	1(4)

=== WPSL Championship ===
WPSL semifinals
(California) Orange County Waves	3
(Massachusetts) Boston Aztec	0
(Florida) Tampa Bay Hellenic	1
(Illinois) Chicago Red Stars	2

WPSL Final
(California) Orange County Waves (a.e.t.)	2
(Illinois) Chicago Red Stars	1

==== Composite top 16 bracket ====
Regional semi-finals
(California) San Diego SeaLions	3
(California) Bay Area Breeze	2
(California) North Bay Wave FC	1
(California) OC Waves	1
(Massachusetts) Boston Aztec	4
(Massachusetts) Boston Aztec U23	0
(Maryland) Chesapeake Charge	1
(New York (state)) New York Fury	0
(Florida) Tampa Bay Hellenic	1st
Florida Sol FC	2nd
(Wisconsin) FC Milwaukee Nationals	0
(Illinois) Chicago Red Stars	4
Oklahoma Alliance	1st
(Texas) FCD Women	2nd
(Arizona) Phoenix Del Sol	1st
Utah Starzz	2nd

Regional finals
(California) San Diego SeaLions	1(1)
(California) OC Waves (pen.)	1(4)
(Massachusetts) Boston Aztec	3
(Maryland) Chesapeake Charge	0
(Florida) Tampa Bay Hellenic	adv
(Illinois) Chicago Red Stars	adv
cancelled	-
-	-

National semi-finals
(California) OC Waves	3
(Massachusetts) Boston Aztec	0
(Florida) Tampa Bay Hellenic	1
(Illinois) Chicago Red Stars	2

National finals
(California) OC Waves (a.e.t.)	2
(Illinois) Chicago Red Stars	1
