= Sylvia Gee =

Irish footballer

Personal information
- Full name: Sylvia Gee
- Date of birth: 30 November 1977 (age 48)
- Positions: Defender; midfielder; forward

College career
Years	Team	Apps	(Gls)
1996–2000	University of Limerick		

Senior career*
Years	Team	Apps	(Gls)
1998	Listowel Celtic		
1999–2000	Benfica (Waterford)		
2000	Springfield Sirens		
2000–2001	Portlaoise		
2001–2002	Leeds United		
2003–2007	UCD		
2007–2011	Tullamore Town		
2008	→ MYSC Lady Blues		
2009	→ Chicago United Breeze		
2010	→ Arizona Rush		
2011	→ London Gryphons		
2011–2012	Cork W.F.C.		
2012	Central SC Cobras		
2012–2014	DLR Waves		
2014–2015	Peamount United		
2015–2018	Kilkenny United		
2018–2019	Limerick		

International career^{‡}
1999–2005	Republic of Ireland		
- * Club domestic league appearances and goals as of 22:37, 7 January 2016 (UTC) ‡ National team caps and goals as of 12:00, 23 September 2011 (UTC)

Sylvia Gee (born 30 November 1977) is a former Republic of Ireland women's international footballer who has spent the majority of her career playing in various women's association football leagues in the Republic of Ireland and the United States. Between 2003 and 2007, Gee was a prominent member and captain of the successful UCD team which qualified for the UEFA Women's Cup on three successive occasions.

== Playing career ==
=== Early years ===
Sylvia Gee was born on 30 November 1977. Gee grew up on a farm in County Offaly before attending Wesley College, Dublin between 1990 and 1996, where she studied for her Leaving Cert. At Wesley, Gee played several sports including field hockey and indoor soccer. Eric Miller was one of her fellow students. Between 1996 and 2000 Gee attended the University of Limerick where she studied production management. While a student at UL, Gee also played association football for Listowel Celtic and Benfica. In 2000, she spent the summer playing for Springfield Sirens in the USL W-League and in 2001–02 she played for Leeds United in the FA Women's Premier League. While playing for Leeds, Gee also worked in the club ticket office.

=== UCD ===
Between 2003 and 2007 Gee played for UCD. Together with Caroline Thorpe and Mary Waldron, Gee was a prominent member and captain of the UCD team which, under coach Larry Mahoney, emerged as one of the strongest women's teams in the Republic of Ireland. UCD completed a four in a row of Dublin Women's Soccer League titles between 2003 and 2006. Gee also played for UCD in the 2003 and 2004 FAI Women's Cup finals, helping the club win the cup three times in row. After winning the FAI Women's Cup, UCD also qualified on three successive occasions to represent the Republic of Ireland in Europe. Gee subsequently captained UCD during their 2003–04, 2004–05 and 2005–06 UEFA Women's Cup campaigns. While playing for UCD, Gee, a UEFA B licensed coach also established a small business called Primary Coaching, which saw her coach association football to children in both primary schools and summer camps.

=== United States ===
In September 1999 Gee played for the Republic of Ireland in an away friendly against the United States. The following summer Gee and some of her Republic of Ireland teammates, including Claire Scanlan, Geraldine O'Shea and Margaret Saurin, returned to the United States to play for Springfield Sirens in the USL W-League. The 2000 Springfield Sirens won thirteen out of fourteen games and finished the season as the W-League second division champions. Since 2008 Gee has regularly spent summers playing and coaching in North America, mostly in the United States. In 2008 she played for MYSC Lady Blues, helping them win the Women's Premier Soccer League Midwest Conference. In the subsequent 2009 and 2010 WPSL seasons she played for Chicago United Breeze and Arizona Rush respectively. In 2011 Gee played for London Gryphons in the USL W-League. In the 2012 W-League season she played for Central SC Cobras. During the winters Gee returned to Ireland and played for Tullamore Town in the Combined Counties Football League.

=== Women's National League ===
When the Women's National League was inaugurated in 2011–12, Gee played for Cork W.F.C. She was subsequently approached by Larry Mahoney, her former coach at UCD, to join him at DLR Waves. While playing for Waves, Gee was named WNL Player of the Month for November/December 2012. Gee was also selected for the 2012–13 WNL Team of the Season. In 2013–14 she was also inducted into the WNL Hall of Fame. During the 2014–15 season, Gee played for Peamount United, helping them reach the final of the WNL Cup. The 2015–16 season saw her switch to Kilkenny United. While playing in the WNL, Gee has also coached at Portlaoise A.F.C.

=== International career ===
Gee has represented the Republic of Ireland at university and senior level. In September 1999 Gee played for the Republic of Ireland in a 5–0 friendly defeat to the United States at Foxboro Stadium. At the time Gee was still a student at University of Limerick and playing for Benfica. In September 2000 Gee was also included the squad for the Celt Cup, a tournament which saw the Republic of Ireland emerge as winners after defeating Northern Ireland and Scotland. On 12 August 2001 Gee scored for the Republic of Ireland, after coming on as a substitute, in a 4–1 win against Scotland at the AUL Complex. Olivia O'Toole also scored a hat–trick for the Republic. Gee was subsequently a member of the Republic of Ireland squad during their 1999 FIFA Women's World Cup, UEFA Women's Euro 2001, 2003 FIFA Women's World Cup and UEFA Women's Euro 2005 qualifying campaigns.

== Honours ==
Individual

- Women's National League Team of the Season
  - 2012–13
- Women's National League Hall of Fame Award
  - 2013–14

UCD

- Dublin Women's Soccer League
  - Winners: 2003, 2004, 2005, 2006: 4
  - Runners-up: 2002: 1
- FAI Women's Cup
  - Winners: 2003, 2004 : 2
  - Runners-up: 2006: 1
- DWSL Premier Cup
  - Winners: 2004, 2005, 2007: 3

Springfield Sirens

- USL W-League W-2
  - Winners: 2000

MYSC Lady Blues

- WPSL Midwest Conference
  - Winners: 2008

Peamount United

- WNL Cup
  - Runners-up: 2015
