= Kerry Connors =

American soccer player (born 1974)

Personal information
- Full name: Kerry Ann Connors
- Date of birth: September 7, 1974 (age 52)
- Place of birth: Somers, Connecticut, U.S.
- Height: 5 ft 5 in (1.65 m)
- Position: Midfielder

Youth career
- –1993: Somers Spartans

College career
Years	Team	Apps	(Gls)
1993–1996	Connecticut Huskies	?	(43)

Senior career*
Years	Team	Apps	(Gls)
1997	Connecticut Wolves		
1998–2000	Boston Renegades		
2001	New York Power	19	(1)
2002	Philadelphia Charge	18	(2)
2003	San Diego Spirit	21	(0)
2004	Massachusetts Stingers		
2005	New England Mutiny		
2006–2007	Massachusetts Stingers		
2008	Boston Aztec		

International career
1997	United States	4	(0)
- * Club domestic league appearances and goals

Kerry Ann Connors (born September 7, 1974) is an American former soccer player who played as a midfielder, making four appearances for the United States women's national team.

== Career ==
Connors played for the Somers Spartans in high school. In college, she played for the Connecticut Huskies from 1993 to 1996, where she was an All-American in 1995 and 1996. She was the Big East Offensive Player of the Year in 1995 and 1996, and was selected in the All-Conference First Team and Academic All-Star Team in 1995 and 1996. She was included in the NSCAA All-Northeast Region in 1995 and 1996, and the NEWISA All-New England selection in 1993, 1995, and 1996. Connors was named Hank O'Donnell Female Athlete of the Year in 1997, and also won the school's Jack Dennerley MVP Award in 1995 and 1996, the Gelfenbien Family Academic Achievement Award in 1996, and the Outstanding Senior Athlete Award in 1997. In total, she scored 43 goals and recorded 42 assists for the Huskies.

Connors made her international debut for the United States on March 3, 1997, in a friendly match against Australia. In total, she made four appearances for the U.S., earning her final cap on October 9, 1997, in a friendly match against Germany.

In club soccer, Connors was selected by the New York Power in the 2000 WUSA Draft, having previously played with the Connecticut Wolves women's team. In the 2001 season, she scored one goal and recorded two assists in nineteen regular season appearances for the Power, and made one postseason appearance. She joined the Philadelphia Charge for the 2002 season, scoring twice and assisting one goal in eighteen regular league appearances for the team, and started in one postseason game. In the 2003 season, she played for the San Diego Spirit and played in 21 games where she recorded two assists, and also played in one postseason match. She later played for the New England Mutiny and Boston Aztec. In 2005, she was selected to play for a WPSL All-Stars team.

== Personal life ==
Connors is a native of Somers, Connecticut. She attended the University of Connecticut for a degree in sociology.

== Career statistics ==
=== International ===
United States
Year	Apps	Goals
1997	4	0
Total	4	0
