= 2013 WPSL season =

Women's Premier Soccer League
- Season: 2013
- Champions: San Diego WFC SeaLions
- Matches: 11
- Goals: 52 (4.73 per match)
- Biggest home win: ACF Torino USA 9, Lions Swarm 0 (May 18th)
- Biggest away win: Lancaster Inferno 10, Lions Swarm 0 (June 29th)

The 2013 Women's Premier Soccer League season is the 16th season of the WPSL.

== Standings ==
As of 7/14/13
2013 Division Title 2013 Playoff Team

=== Big Sky Conference ===
==== North Division ====
Place	Team	P	W	L	T	GF	GA	GD	Points
1	Tucson Soccer Academy	8	6	1	1	27	8	+19	19
2	Real Salt Lake Women	8	5	2	1	20	14	+6	16
3	Phoenix Del Sol	8	4	3	1	26	17	+9	13
4	Utah Starzz	8	2	5	1	16	18	-2	7
5	St. George United	8	1	7	0	10	42	-32	3

==== South Division ====
Place	Team	P	W	L	T	GF	GA	GD	Points
1	Houston Aces	10	10	0	0	23	1	+22	30
2	Houston South Select	10	6	4	0	17	16	+1	18
3	Fort Worth Panthers	10	6	4	0	15	14	+1	18
4	Oklahoma City FC	9	4	5	0	21	15	+6	12
5	Tulsa Spirit	9	2	7	0	8	18	-10	6
6	Texas FC	10	1	9	0	7	27	-20	3

=== Northeast Atlantic Conference ===
==== New England Division ====
Place	Team	P	W	L	T	GF	GA	GD	Points
1	New England Mutiny	10	5	0	5	19	5	+14	20
2	Boston Breakers College Academy	10	6	2	2	24	19	+5	20
3	Boston Aztec	10	5	1	4	23	7	+16	19
4	CFC Passion	10	4	3	3	18	15	+3	15
5	Seacoast United Phantoms	10	1	8	1	14	31	-17	4
6	Seacoast United Mariners	10	1	8	1	9	30	-21	4

==== Mid-Atlantic Division ====
Place	Team	P	W	L	T	GF	GA	GD	Points
1	Empire Revolution WNY	10	8	2	0	32	13	+19	24
2	Syracuse Lady Knights	10	6	2	2	23	11	+12	20
3	FC Westchester	10	4	3	3	9	11	-2	15
4	Yankee Lady FC	10	3	3	4	9	11	-2	13
5	United FC Binghamton	10	1	6	3	7	18	-11	6
6	Tri-City Celtics	10	0	6	4	8	24	-16	4

==== Tri-State Division ====
Place	Team	P	W	L	T	GF	GA	GD	Points
1	New York Athletic Club	10	7	1	2	26	8	+18	23
2	Long Island Fury	10	7	2	1	30	10	+20	22
3	BuxMont Torch FC	10	5	3	2	24	24	0	17
4	FC LVU Lady Sonic	10	4	5	1	15	18	-3	13
5	FC Bucks	10	3	5	2	23	23	0	11
6	New Jersey Blaze	10	0	10	0	10	45	-35	0

==== South Atlantic Division ====
Place	Team	P	W	L	T	GF	GA	GD	Points
1	ASA Chesapeake Charge	10	8	0	2	36	5	+31	26
2	Lancaster Inferno	10	6	1	3	40	10	+30	21
3	ACF Torino USA	10	5	3	2	25	10	+15	17
4	Philadelphia Fever	10	4	6	0	21	22	-1	12
5	Tidewater Sharks	9	2	6	1	16	34	-18	7
6	Lions Swarm	9	0	9	0	5	62	-57	0

=== Midwest Conference ===
Place	Team	P	W	L	T	GF	GA	GD	Points
1	Ohio Galaxies	8	6	2	0	30	6	+24	18
2	Fire and Ice Soccer Club	8	6	2	0	18	8	+10	18
3	Kansas City Shock	8	6	2	0	16	7	+9	18
4	Des Moines Menace	8	5	3	0	15	8	+7	15
5	Madison 56ers	8	5	3	0	16	10	+6	15
6	Quad City Eagles	8	4	4	0	19	13	+6	12
7	Indiana United	7	2	5	0	8	18	-10	6
8	Fort Wayne FC	7	0	7	0	6	34	-28	0
9	FC St. Louis	8	0	8	0	0	24	-24	0

FC St. Louis dropped out of competition after scheduling but before the season started, forfeiting all of its matches as 3-0 wins for the opposing teams.

=== Northwest Conference ===
==== Washington Division ====
Place	Team	P	W	L	T	GF	GA	GD	Points
1	Issaquah Soccer Club	10	7	1	2	27	8	+19	23
2	AC Seattle	10	7	2	1	31	15	+16	22
3	Emerald City FC	10	6	2	2	25	9	+16	20
4	Spokane Shine	10	0	10	0	4	39	-35	0

==== Oregon Division ====
Place	Team	P	W	L	T	GF	GA	GD	Points
1	THUSC Diamonds	9	7	1	1	31	11	+20	22
2	Eugene Metro Futbol Club	10	4	5	1	19	26	-7	13
3	Westside Timbers	10	3	6	1	9	19	-10	10
4	Bend Timbers	9	1	8	0	6	25	-19	3

=== Pacific Conference ===
==== North Division ====
Place	Team	P	W	L	T	GF	GA	GD	Points
1	California Storm Elk Grove	10	8	1	1	29	4	+25	25
2	West Coast Wildcatz	10	7	2	1	17	8	+9	22
3	North Bay FC Wave	10	6	3	1	20	10	+10	19
4	San Francisco Nighthawks	10	4	4	2	14	13	+1	14
5	Central California HEAT	10	1	7	2	7	20	-13	5
6	California Storm Sacramento	10	0	9	1	4	36	-32	1

==== South Division ====
Place	Team	P	W	L	T	GF	GA	GD	Points
1	San Diego WFC SeaLions	6	5	0	1	26	8	+18	11
2	Beach Futbol Club	5	3	2	0	14	9	+5	6
3	LA Premier FC	6	1	3	2	9	17	-8	5
4	Ajax America Women	5	0	4	1	2	17	-15	1

=== Southeast Conference ===
Place	Team	P	W	L	T	GF	GA	GD	Points
1	Gulf Coast Texans	7	6	0	1	17	3	+14	19
2	Alabama FC	7	2	2	3	6	4	+2	9
3	Georgia Revolution	7	2	3	2	10	13	-3	8
4	Knoxville Lady Force	7	1	3	3	8	14	-6	6
5	Mississippi Fuego FC	8	1	4	3	11	18	-7	6

=== Sunshine Conference ===
Place	Team	P	W	L	T	GF	GA	GD	Points
1	Florida Sol FC	6	5	0	1	13	2	+12	16
2	FC Surge	6	4	1	1	10	3	+7	13
3	Team Boca Blast	6	2	4	0	5	12	-7	6
4	Pinellas County United SC	6	0	6	0	4	15	-11	0

== Playoffs ==
=== West Region ===
==== Northwest bracket ====
Division Semifinals
WA1	(Washington (state)) Issaquah Soccer Club	3
OR2	(Oregon) Eugene Metro Futbol Club	0
OR1	(Oregon) THUSC Diamonds	0
WA2	(Washington (state)) AC Seattle	1

Division Final
WA1	(Washington (state)) Issaquah Soccer Club	1
WA2	(Washington (state)) AC Seattle	3

==== West bracket ====
Regional semifinals
NW	(Washington (state)) AC Seattle	0
PN	(California) Storm Elk Grove	1
BSN	(Arizona) Tucson Soccer Academy	0
PS	(California) San Diego WFC SeaLions	2

Regional Final
PN	(California) Storm Elk Grove	1
PS	(California) San Diego WFC SeaLions (OT)	2

=== Central Region ===
==== Midwest bracket ====
Division Semifinals
1	Ohio Galaxies	1
4	(Iowa) Des Moines Menace	4
3	Kansas City Shock	2
2	(Illinois) Fire and Ice Soccer Club	4

Division Final
4	(Iowa) Des Moines Menace	0
2	(Illinois) Fire and Ice Soccer Club	2

==== Central region final ====
Regional Final
MW	(Illinois) Fire and Ice Soccer Club	1
BSS	(Texas) Houston Aces	2

=== East Region ===
East first round
SA1	(Maryland) ASA Chesapeake Charge	1
TS2	(New York (state)) Long Island Fury	0
TS1	(New York (state)) NYAC	3
SA2	(Pennsylvania) Lancaster Inferno	1
NE1	(Massachusetts) New England Mutiny	1
MA2	(New York (state)) Syracuse Lady Knights	0
MA1	(New York (state)) Empire Revolution WNY	3
NE2	(Massachusetts) Breakers College Academy	1

East semifinals
SA1	(Maryland) ASA Chesapeake Charge	3
TS1	(New York (state)) NYAC	1
NE1	(Massachusetts) New England Mutiny	2
MA1	(New York (state)) Empire Revolution WNY	0

East final
SA1	(Maryland) ASA Chesapeake Charge	2
NE1	(Massachusetts) New England Mutiny	3

=== South Region ===
==== Southeast bracket ====
Play-in
4	(Tennessee) Knoxville Lady Force	5
5	Mississippi Fuego FC	2

Division semifinals
1	(Florida) Gulf Coast Texans	3
4	(Tennessee) Knoxville Lady Force	0
3	Alabama FC	2
2	GA Georgia Revolution	0

Division final
1	(Florida) Gulf Coast Texans	1
3	Alabama FC	0

==== Sunshine bracket ====
Division Semifinals
1	Florida Sol FC	4
4	(Florida) Pinellas County United SC	1
3	(Florida) Team Boca Blast	2
2	(Florida) FC Surge	3

Division Final
1	Florida Sol FC	5
2	(Florida) FC Surge	0

==== South region final ====
Regional Final
SE	(Florida) Gulf Coast Texans	2
Sh	Florida Sol FC	1

=== National Championship ===
Semi-finals
(Massachusetts) New England Mutiny	1
(Texas) Houston Aces	4
(Florida) Gulf Coast Texans	1(9)
(California) San Diego WFC SeaLions	1(10)

Final
(Texas) Houston Aces	1
(California) San Diego WFC SeaLions	2

==== Composite top 16 bracket ====
Regional semi-finals
(Maryland) ASA Charge	3
(New York (state)) NYAC	1
(Massachusetts) New England Mutiny	2
(New York (state)) Empire Revs WNY	0
(Iowa) Des Moines Menace	0
(Illinois) Fire & Ice SC	2
(Texas) Houston Aces	1st
(Texas) Houston South Select	2nd
(Florida) Gulf Coast Texans	1
Alabama FC	0
Florida Sol FC	5
(Florida) FC Surge	0
(Washington (state)) AC Seattle	0
(California) Storm Elk Grove	1
(Arizona) Tucson Academy	0
(California) San Diego SeaLions	2

Regional finals
(Maryland) ASA Charge	2
(Massachusetts) New England Mutiny	3
(Illinois) Fire & Ice SC	1
(Texas) Houston Aces	2
(Florida) Gulf Coast Texans	2
Florida Sol FC	1
(California) Storm Elk Grove	1
(California) San Diego SeaLions	2(OT)

National semi-finals
(Massachusetts) New England Mutiny	1
(Texas) Houston Aces	4
(Florida) Gulf Coast Texans	1(9)
(California) San Diego SeaLions	1(10)

National finals
(Texas) Houston Aces	1
(California) San Diego SeaLions	2
