= McKenzie Berryhill =

American soccer player

Personal information
- Full name: McKenzie Marie Berryhill
- Date of birth: March 24, 1993 (age 33)
- Place of birth: Phoenix, Arizona, United States
- Height: 5 ft 8 in (1.73 m)
- Position: Defender

Youth career
- 2005–20??: Sereno SC
- –2012: SC del Sol

College career
Years	Team	Apps	(Gls)
2012–2015	Arizona State Sun Devils	76	(6)

Senior career*
Years	Team	Apps	(Gls)
2010–2014	Phoenix Del Sol	27+	(3+)
2015	Seattle Sounders Women		
2016	Portland Thorns	5	(0)
2016–2017	Orlando Pride	0	(0)
2018	Klepp	22	(0)
2019	Washington Spirit	3	(0)
Total		57+	(3+)

International career
2017	United States (futsal)		
- * Club domestic league appearances and goals

McKenzie Marie Berryhill (born March 24, 1993) is an American retired soccer player who played as a defender. A native of Phoenix, Arizona, Berryhill was a two-sport athlete at Greenway High School and played four years of college soccer at Arizona State University (ASU). She was named First Team All-Pac-12 Conference as a senior and helped the Sun Devils qualify for the 2014 NCAA Division I Women's Soccer Tournament.

While in school, Berryhill played summer seasons with Phoenix Del Sol in the Women's Premier Soccer League (WPSL) and with Seattle Sounders Women in the USL W-League. She began her four-year professional career after being drafted by Portland Thorns FC in the third round of the 2016 NWSL College Draft. Berryhill appeared in five games for Portland before moving to Orlando Pride, although she did not make an appearance during parts of two seasons with the Pride. She then played one year in Norway with Klepp IL before returning to the United States for a season with Washington Spirit. Berryhill retired from professional soccer in July 2020.

During her career, Berryhill also played futsal. She helped the United States women's national futsal team to a seventh-place finish at the 2017 AMF Futsal Women's World Cup.

== Early life ==
Berryhill was born on March 24, 1993, in Phoenix, Arizona. As a kid, she did ballet for eight years before she started playing soccer at the age of 12 with Sereno SC. After leaving Sereno, she played club soccer with SC del Sol, winning eight Arizona Soccer Association state championships. Berryhill was a two-sport athlete at Greenway High School in Phoenix, playing soccer and competing on the track and field team, and was twice named to The Arizona Republic All-Phoenix Girls Soccer Team. She committed to play college soccer at Arizona State University, part of a recruiting class that also included Cali Farquharson.

== College and amateur ==
"I literally tell myself do whatever you have to do to win the game, who cares if you twist an ankle. Don't go in scared. I want to take the team as far as we can go and be the best I can for everybody around me."

— Berryhill, speaking about herself before the 2014 NCAA Division I Women's Soccer Tournament.

Berryhill made her Arizona State debut on August 17, 2012, starting a 1–0 defeat against Cal State Northridge. She tallied her first career goal in mid-October, scoring off a corner kick in a 1–1 draw against Oregon State, and concluded her freshman season with one goal from 19 appearances. As a sophomore, Berryhill earned Second Team All-Pac-12 honors and was named to the National Soccer Coaches Association of America (NSCAA) All-Pacific Region Third Team. She played every minute of the season, including an "absolute exceptional day" in an upset victory against no. 2-ranked Stanford on October 6. After making 19 appearances on the year, Berryhill took part in a training camp for the United States women's national under-23 soccer team in the summer of 2014.

To open her junior season, Berryhill scored a brace in a season-opening 2–2 draw against Texas. With the Sun Devils down by two goals at halftime, she scored in the 62nd and 85th minutes to bring ASU back for the tie. Although she missed time due to injury, Berryhill finished the season with two goals from 20 appearances and was named First Team All-Pac-12. She helped the Sun Devils qualify for the 2014 NCAA Division I Women's Soccer Tournament, where they beat Northern Arizona to earn their first tournament victory since 2003. Berryhill concluded her time at Arizona State with a career-high three goals from 18 appearances as a senior. That mark included game-winning goals in the final two matches of the season for ASU: against Colorado on November 1 and Arizona on November 6. Berryhill wrapped up her collegiate career with six goals and four assists from 76 appearances.

=== Summer leagues ===
For five summer seasons, from 2010 to 2014, Berryhill played in the Women's Premier Soccer League with Phoenix Del Sol. She first played with Phoenix in 2010, following her sophomore year of high school, and scored one goal in eight appearances while helping the club to an appearance in the WPSL playoffs. Berryhill scored once in six appearances in 2011 and added a further seven appearances in 2012 before going to Arizona State. She continued to play for Phoenix following her first two collegiate seasons, scoring once in seven appearances during the 2013 campaign. Berryhill was also on the roster for the 2014 season after her sophomore year at ASU.

Following her junior collegiate season, Berryhill switched clubs and leagues and joined Seattle Sounders Women of the USL W-League, a signing that was announced by Seattle on January 8, 2015. In her lone season with the club, Berryhill helped the Sounders qualify for the playoffs and started the Western Conference playoff match against Colorado Pride.

== Club career ==
=== Portland Thorns ===
Berryhill was drafted by Portland Thorns FC with the 21st overall pick of the 2016 NWSL College Draft. She was one of two Arizona State players selected, as her Sun Devil teammate Cali Farquharson went to Washington Spirit with the 12th overall pick. After taking part in preseason, Berryhill officially signed with the Thorns on April 11. She made her club and professional debut on May 29, playing 27 minutes of a 0–0 draw against Seattle Reign. She replaced Christine Sinclair at halftime, but was herself substituted for Shade Pratt in the 72nd minute. Berryhill appeared in four other games for Portland, all coming in consecutive matches from July 2–30. She was waived by the Thorns on August 30 in order to free up a roster spot to activate Kendall Johnson from the disabled list.

=== Orlando Pride ===
On August 31, 2016, one day after being waived by Portland, Berryhill was claimed off waivers by National Women's Soccer League (NWSL) expansion club Orlando Pride. Although she was named to the bench twice, she did not appear during the Pride's final four matches of the 2016 season, but still had her contract option picked up at the end of the year. On the first day of preseason in 2017, Berryhill failed her medical due to a series of concussions suffered while she was at Arizona State. Unable to get medical clearance, she was placed on the season-ending injury list. At the end of the year, the Pride put Berryhill on the NWSL Re-Entry Wire, ending her time in Orlando without having played in a game with the club. She went unselected off the wire and subsequently became a free agent.

=== Klepp ===
Following her departure from Orlando, Berryhill moved to Norway and signed with Toppserien club Klepp IL on January 5, 2018. Upon her signing, Klepp manager Olli Harder tipped Berryhill to play a "central role in the team", and she went on to appear in every one of the club's matches, featuring 26 times between the league and the Norwegian Women's Cup. Berryhill debuted for the club on March 24, playing the full 90 minutes in a season-opening 2–1 defeat against Arna-Bjørnar. She helped Klepp to a second-place finish in the Toppserien, buoyed by a 12-match unbeaten streak to finish the season, as well as a run to the semifinals of the cup. However, in the cup semifinal against Sandviken, Berryhill missed her attempt in the penalty shoot-out as Klepp were eliminated 3–1 on penalties. She departed the club at the end of the year following the expiration of her contract.

=== Washington Spirit ===
Returning to the United States, Berryhill went on trial with NWSL club Washington Spirit ahead of the 2019 season. After taking part in preseason, she was named to the final roster on April 8. With the signing, Berryhill was reunited with her Arizona State and Phoenix del Sol teammate Cali Farquharson, who entered her fourth season with the Spirit. Berryhill made her Washington debut on May 18, appearing off the bench in a 3–1 victory against Portland Thorns. She replaced Meggie Dougherty Howard in the 75th minute and finished out the game at center back. Berryhill played sparingly throughout the remainder of the season, finishing with a total of three appearances in all competitions. At the end of the year, she was placed on the NWSL Re-Entry Wire by the Spirit, ending her time with the club after one season. Berryhill cleared the wire and subsequently became a free agent.

=== Retirement ===
Ahead of the 2020 season, Berryhill went on trial in Sweden with defending Damallsvenskan champions FC Rosengård. She played in a pair of preseason games, with the club's sporting director Therese Sjögran saying that Berryhill was "confident with the ball and dared to play forward." However, she did not sign a contract and departed Rosengård at the end of preseason.

On July 19, 2020, Berryhill announced her retirement from professional soccer. In a statement posted on her Instagram account, she said "I'm grateful for the time I have had. But, at the end of the day I've decided to go out in the world and go after another dream I've had. I'll still play for fun because I don't think I could ever completely walk away...".

== Futsal career ==
Outside of her soccer career, Berryhill also played futsal, an indoor variant of the sport. She was a member of the United States women's national futsal team squad for the 2017 AMF Futsal Women's World Cup, alongside former Portland teammate Maureen Fitzgerald. Berryhill helped the U.S. to a seventh-place finish in the tournament, culminating in a 7–1 victory over Switzerland in the seventh place match.

== Personal life ==
Berryhill graduated from Arizona State with a Bachelor of Science in communication. She is engaged to fellow soccer player Chloe Logarzo, who she met while they were teammates with Washington Spirit. Berryhill is the second of three children: her younger sister, Davis, is a cheerleader for the Arizona Cardinals, and her older sister, Devin, works as a golf professional at Phoenix Country Club.

== Career statistics ==
Appearances and goals by club, season and competition
Club	Season	League			Cup (Note: All appearances in the Norwegian Women's Cup)		Other		Total	
Club	Season	Division	Apps	Goals	Apps	Goals	Apps	Goals	Apps	Goals
Phoenix Del Sol	2010	WPSL	8	1	—			0	8+	1
Phoenix Del Sol	2011	WPSL	6	1	—		—		6	1
Phoenix Del Sol	2012	WPSL	6	0	—		—		6	0
Phoenix Del Sol	2013	WPSL	7	1	—		—		7	1
Phoenix Del Sol	2014	WPSL			—		—			
Phoenix Del Sol	Total		27+	3+	0	0		0	27+	3+
Seattle Sounders Women	2015	USL W-League			—		1 (Note: Appearance in the USL W-League playoffs)	0	1+	0+
Portland Thorns	2016	NWSL	5	0	—		0	0	5	0
Orlando Pride	2016	NWSL	0	0	—		—		0	0
Orlando Pride	2017	NWSL	0	0	—		0	0	0	0
Orlando Pride	Total		0	0	0	0	0	0	0	0
Klepp	2018	Toppserien	22	0	4	0	—		26	0
Washington Spirit	2019	NWSL	3	0	—		—		3	0
Career total			57+	3+	4	0	1+	0	62+	3+

== Honors ==
Phoenix Del Sol

- WPSL Big Sky Conference – North Division: 2010, 2011

Seattle Sounders Women

- USL W-League Western Conference: 2015

Individual

- WPSL All-West Conference Third Team: 2013
- Second team All-Pac-12: 2013
- NSCAA All-Pacific Region Third Team: 2013
- First team All-Pac-12: 2014
- NSCAA All-Pacific Region First Team: 2014
