= Nancy Rohrman =

American soccer player (born 1971)

Personal information
- Full name: Nancy Jean Rohrman
- Birth name: Nancy Jean Kramarz
- Date of birth: March 3, 1971 (age 55)
- Place of birth: Chesterland, Ohio, U.S.
- Height: 5 ft 6 in (1.68 m)
- Position: Midfielder

Youth career
- –1989: West Geauga Wolverines
- Internationals Soccer Club

College career
Years	Team	Apps	(Gls)
1989–1992	Hartford Hawks	83	

Senior career*
Years	Team	Apps	(Gls)
1996–1998	Soccer Academy United		
1996–2001	Maryland Pride		
2006–2008	MYSC Lady Blues		

International career
1993	United States	6	(1)

Managerial career
- Middleton Yahara Soccer Club
- 2008: Edgewood Eagles (assistant)
- Bethesda Soccer Club
- * Club domestic league appearances and goals

Nancy Jean Rohrman (née Kramarz; born March 3, 1971) is an American former soccer player who played as a midfielder, making six appearances for the United States women's national team.

== Career ==
Rohrman played for the West Geauga Wolverines in high school, and was named "Ms. Wolverine" as one of the best senior athletes which demonstrated sportsmanship. She also played for the youth team Internationals Soccer Club. In college, she played for the Hartford Hawks, where she was the team captain in her junior and senior years and earned the ECAC Medal of Merit from Hartford as a senior. She was chosen as the Conference Player of the Year in 1991, and was included in the First-Team All-Conference and NEWISA All-New England second team in 1991 and 1992. She also received NSCAA All-Region Honors in all four years, having been included in the first team in 1990 and the second team in 1989, 1991, and 1992. Rohrman was included in the NCAA All-Tournament team in 1992, and was named as part of the ISAA (Intercollegiate Soccer Association of America) Senior Team the same year. In total, she played in 83 games for the Hawks.

Rohrman had participated in four editions of the U.S. Olympic Festival. She made her international debut for the United States on April 10, 1993 in a friendly match against Germany. In total, she made six appearances for the U.S. and scored one goal, earning her final cap on July 14, 1993 in a friendly match against Russia.

In club soccer, Rohrman played for the Maryland Pride in the USL W-League, winning the 1996 championship, as well as Soccer Academy United in Virginia, winning three consecutive USASA National Women's Amateur titles. She also played for the MYSC Lady Blues of the WPSL in 2008, where she was named Conference Player of the Year and was included in the All-WPSL second team.

She was inducted into the Ohio North Youth Soccer Association in 2002, and the University of Hartford Athletics Hall of Fame in 2005. She later began coaching, and holds a U.S. Soccer National "B" license. She coached at Middleton Yahara Soccer Club, and worked as an assistant for the Edgewood Eagles. She now serves as a coach for Bethesda Soccer Club in Gaithersburg, Maryland.

== Personal life ==
Rohrman is a native of Chesterland, Ohio. She graduated from the College of Education, Nursing and Health Professions at the University of Hartford in 1993. She is married to Jeff Rohrman, former soccer player and coach, and has three children.

== Career statistics ==
=== International ===
United States
Year	Apps	Goals
1993	6	1
Total	6	1

=== International goals ===
No.	Date	Location	Opponent	Result	Competition
1	July 10, 1993	Hamilton, Ontario, Canada	Japan	7–0	Friendly
