= Lancaster Inferno (USLW) =

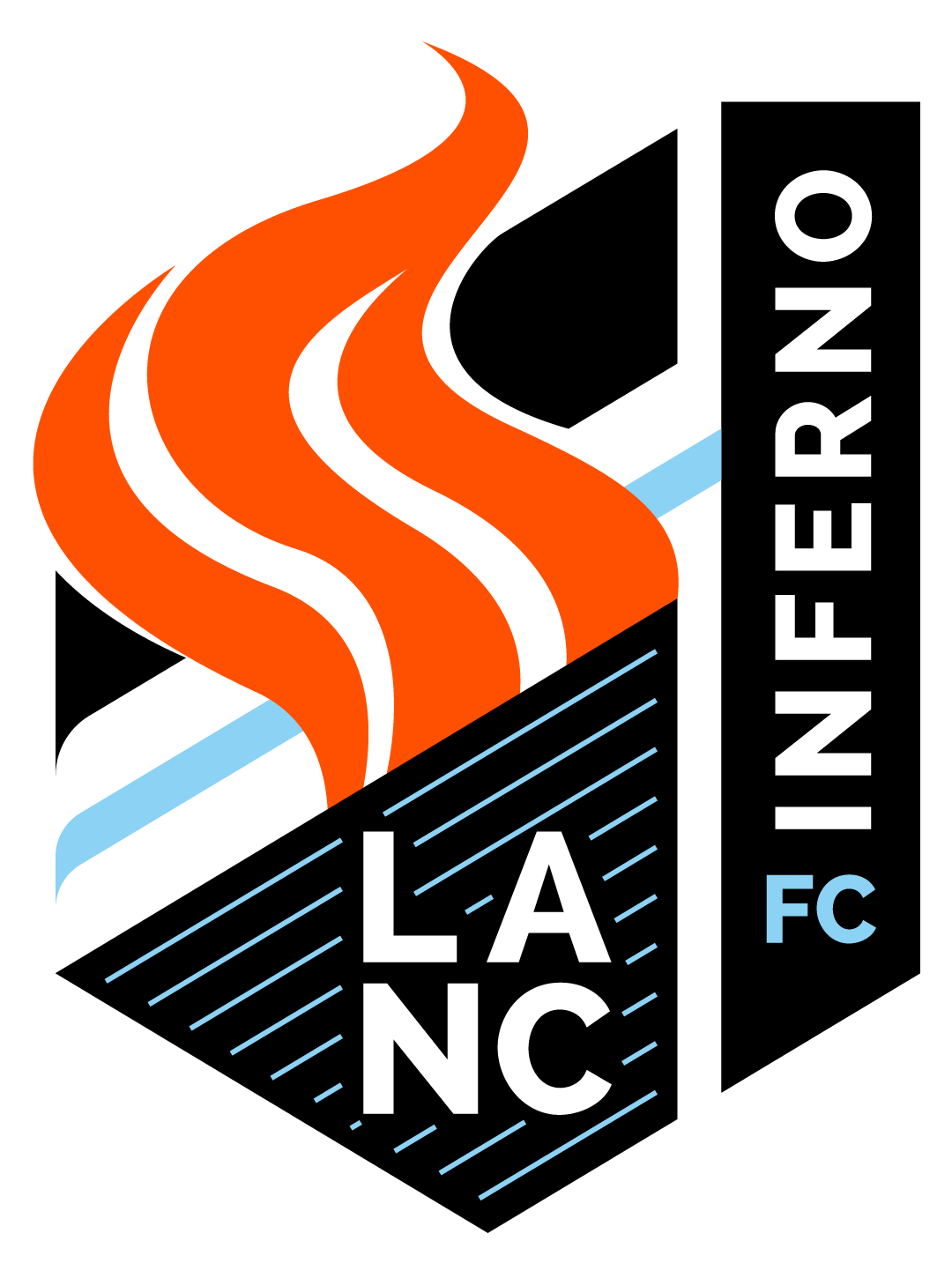
- Full name: Lancaster Inferno
- Nickname: Inferno
- Founded: 2008
- Stadium: Penn Medicine Park
- Head Coach: (Honduras) Stephanie Cleaves
- League: USL W League
- Website: http://www.lancasterinferno.com
Home colors	Away colors

Lancaster Inferno is a top level amateur women's soccer club based in Lancaster, Pennsylvania. Founded in 2008, the club fields a first team that plays in United Soccer League Women's division (USLW), a national pro-am league at the second tier of the American Soccer Pyramid, and a U23 team that competes in USL Women's Under 23 level.

== Timeline ==
- 2008: PA Classics starts Lancaster Inferno, a women's team playing in the WPSL (Women's Premier Soccer League), along with a men's team playing in the National Premier Soccer League, also called the Lancaster Inferno. The women are coached by Doug Harris. The home field is Hempfield High School's athletic stadium in Landisville.
- 2009: The men's team folds, but the women continue to compete.
- 2011: Inferno is no longer under the PA Classics umbrella, and plays under the sponsorship of the Penn Legacy Soccer Club. The team's name is changed to "Penn Legacy Inferno".
- 2013: Inferno becomes independent, no longer associated with PA Classics or Penn Legacy. The team's name reverts to its former name, "Lancaster Inferno".
- 2014: Lancaster Inferno is sold to Francisco Cleaves, who also begins operations as head coach.
- 2015: Inferno changes its home field to Millersville University's Pucillo Field in the Lancaster suburb of Millersville.
- 2016: Lancaster Inferno leaves WPSL and joins United Women's Soccer (UWS).
- 2018: The team enters an agreement with Rush Soccer, to be recognized as the club's top level women's team. The team's name was changed to Inferno Rush, branding under the Rush Soccer brand, along with the USL's Penn FC. The Inferno became both the UWS East Conference Regular Season Champions, as well as beating the Connecticut Fusion to become the East Conference Playoff Champions. The Inferno went to the UWS National Championship held in Grand Rapids, Michigan and defeated Grand Rapids FC in the semi-final match. In the final match, Inferno faced the Houston Aces and lost 1-0 in extra time.
- 2019: The agreement with Rush Soccer was terminated and the team reverted to its former name, "Lancaster Inferno".
- 2024: The Inferno join the USL W League as part of an expansion.
- 2025: The Inferno plays 5 games at the Lancaster Stormers' artificial turf stadium, Penn Medicine Park. Lines on the field can be removed using water for baseball games. The new mascot, Fern, first appears at Inferno home games and was created by Keystone Mascots.

== Players ==
=== 2026 First Team ===
Note: Flags indicate national team as defined under FIFA eligibility rules; some limited exceptions apply. Players may hold more than one non-FIFA nationality.

No.	Pos.	Nation	Player
0		USA	Riley Houck
2		USA	Ava Shappell
4		USA	Olivia Rubinich
5		USA	Jessica Weinoldt
7		USA	Carsyn Boyer
9		USA	Anouk Landgraff
10		USA	Ryelle Shuey
11		USA	Noelle Clabaugh
12		USA	Mackenzie Mentzer
18		USA	Madison Murphy
19		USA	Payton Quinones

No.	Pos.	Nation	Player
20		USA	Ava LeMay
22		USA	Evangelia Barakos
23		USA	Annabelle Wunderlich
24		USA	Kherington Yezik
29		USA	Piper Lazar
30		USA	Brooklyn Showalter
31		USA	Rachel Eberly
34		USA	Kyra Kramer
55		USA	Makenzy Shanklin
99		USA	Kaeyla Noble

Note: Flags indicate national team as defined under FIFA eligibility rules; some limited exceptions apply. Players may hold more than one non-FIFA nationality.

No.	Pos.	Nation	Player
—		USA	Avery King
—		USA	Ashley Lavrich

=== Notable former and present players ===
- (United States) Kelly O'Brien: Lancaster Inferno (2017–2019) Diósgyőri VTK of the Hungarian Női Nemzeti Bajnokság
- (United States) (Colombia) Sonia Rada: Lancaster Inferno(2019), EN Thoi Lakatamia (Cyprus) 2018-2019, FF Lugano 1976 Lugano, Switzerland (2017-2018),
- (United States) Emily Armstrong: Sundsvalls DFF (Sundsvalls damfotbollsförening), Sweden (present); IBV, in league Úrvalsdeild Kvenna, Iceland (2018); Medkila IL, Norway (2017); Lancaster Inferno (2016)
- (United States) Sydney Blomquist: Lancaster Inferno (2014 & 2016), Västerås BK30 (2016), Åland United (2017), Sporting CP (2019–present)
- (United States) Emily Dolan: Real Betis Balompié (Liga Iberdrola), Spain (2018–present); KKPK Medyk Konin (Champions League & Ekstraliga), Poland (2017–2018); USD San Zaccaria/Ravenna Woman (Serie A), Italy (2016–2017); Lancaster Inferno (2016)
- (United States) Jade Flory: Lancaster Inferno (2013–2014), Prottur Reykjavik otherwise known as Throttur FC (Icelandic Women’s Premier Division) / Ravasens IK Karlskoga (Sweden)
- (United States) Tesa McKibben: Lancaster Inferno (2012–2014, 2017–present); Germany's FC Saarbrücken (2014–2016); Germany's ETSV Wurzburg (2014)
- (United States) Teresa Rynier: Lancaster Inferno (2007–2010, 2016, 2018–present); Ottawa Fury (2011 & 2014); FH Hafnafjördur, Iceland (2013); Kvarnsvedens IK, Sweden (2012)
- (United States) Kendra Jones: Lancaster Inferno (2010–2012, 2018–present); Women's National Premier Leagues's FC Bulleen Lions & Bayside United FC in Melbourne Australia (2016–2017); Czech Republic's Zeny 1 Liga team AC Sparta Praha (2015); Victorian Premier League of Australia: Heidelberg United (2013–2014)
- Carol Sánchez: Independiente Santa Fe (Colombia) & the Costa Rica women's national football team Lancaster Inferno (2016)

== Team standings and statistics ==
Year	Division	League	GP	W	L	T	GF	GA	GD	Pts	Reg. season	Playoffs	Championship
2026	4	USLW	10	5	2	3	24	13	11	17	2nd of 5, Mid Atlantic Division	did not qualify	did not qualify
2025	4	USLW	10	4	5	1	20	17	3	13	4th of 5, Mid Atlantic Division	did not qualify	did not qualify
2024	4	USLW	12	10	1	1	50	7	43	31	2nd of 8, Mid Atlantic Division	Conference Semifinals	did not qualify
2023	4	UWS	8	6	1	1	16	9	7	19	4th of 17, East Division	Eastern Conference Champions	National Semifinals
2022	4	UWS	10	8	1	1	27	9	18	25	2nd of 5, Mid-Atlantic Division	did not qualify	did not qualify
2021	4	UWS	10	4	2	4	17	10	7	16	5th of 13, East Conference	Conference Semifinals	did not qualify
2020	2	UWS	Season cancelled due to COVID-19										
2019	2	UWS	10	7	4	0	15	14	1	21	3rd of 8, East Conference	East Conference Champions	National Semi-Finalist
2018	2	UWS	10	7	3	0	22	10	12	21	East Conference Champions	East Conference Champions	National Runners-up
2017	2	UWS	10	4	6	0	18	23	–5	12	6th of 8, East Conference	Did not qualify	Did not qualify
2016	2	UWS	10	4	5	1	16	15	1	13	4th of 6, East Conference	Did not qualify	Did not qualify
2015	3	WPSL	8	1	6	1	12	23	–11	4	5th of 5, Power 5	Did not qualify	Did not qualify
2014	3	WPSL	8	6	1	1	20	8	12	0	Provisional Season	Provisional Season	Provisional Season
2013	3	WPSL	11	6	2	3	41	13	28	21	2nd of 6, Northeast Atlantic - South	1st round, Conference Playoffs	Did not qualify
2012	3	WPSL	10	5	4	1	17	13	4	16	3rd of 5, Northeast Atlantic - South	Did not qualify	Did not qualify
2011	3	WPSL	10	3	4	3	12	9	3	12	7th of 9, East Mid-Atlantic	Did not qualify	Did not qualify
2010	3	WPSL	10	6	1	3	20	8	12	21	1st of 5, East Mid-Atlantic	2nd round, Regional Playoffs	Did not qualify
2009	3	WPSL	10	7	1	2	23	9	14	23	3rd of 14, East	Conference Finals	Did not qualify
2008	3	WPSL	14	8	2	2	25	9	16	26	2nd of 7, East Mid-Atlantic	Conference Semi-finals	Did not qualify

== Coaching staff ==
- (United States) Stephanie Cleaves, Head Coach of First Team (2023–present)
- (United States) Adam Johnny Morris, Assistant Coach of First Team (2025–present)
- (United States) Courtney Browning, Assistant Coach of First Team (2026–present)
- (United States) Wendell Hannaford, Head Coach of U23 Team (2021–present)
- (United States) Chris Weibel, Strength & Conditioning Coach (2014–present)

== Home stadiums ==
- Hempfield High School (2008–2014)
- Pucillo Field, Millersville University (2015–2023)
- Warwick High School (2024 - Still used as of 2025 for U23 games)
- Penn Medicine Park (2025)
