= Dallas Select =

- Full name: Dallas Select
- Founded: 2007
- Ground: Old Panther Field
- Manager: (United States) Robert Podeyn
- League: Women's Premier Soccer League
- 2008: 5th, Big Sky South Division
Home colors	Away colors

Dallas Select is an American women's soccer team, founded in 2007. The team is a member of the Women's Premier Soccer League, the third tier of women's soccer in the United States and Canada. The team plays in the South Division of the Big Sky Conference. Prior to the 2009 season they were known as Vitesse Dallas.

The team plays its home games at Old Panther Field in the city of Duncanville, Texas, 14 miles south-west of downtown Dallas. The club's colors are blue, beige and white.

== Year-by-year ==
Year	Division	League	Reg. season	Playoffs
2008	3	WPSL	5th, Big Sky South	Did not qualify

== Coaches ==
- (United States) Robert Podeyn 2008–present

== Stadia ==
- Old Panther Field, Duncanville, Texas 2008–present
