= OAFC =

OAFC may refer to:

- Oakengates Athletic F.C., former association football club in Shropshire, England
- Oldland Abbotonians F.C., association football club in Gloucestershire, England
- Ormond Amateur Football Club, Australian rules football club near Melbourne
- Oklahoma Alliance, women's association football club in Oklahoma, United States

== See also ==
- Oldham Athletic A.F.C., association football club in Greater Manchester, England
- Ossett Albion A.F.C., former association football club in West Yorkshire, England
