= Arizona Rush =

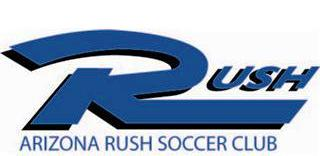
- Full name: Arizona Rush Soccer Club
- Nickname: Rush
- Founded: 2007; 19 years ago
- Stadium: Murphey Field
- Chairman: (United States) Lisa Balcer
- Manager: (United States) Chris Fernandez
- League: Women's Premier Soccer League
- 2008: 2nd, Big Sky North Division; Playoff National Final
Home colors	Away colors

Arizona Rush was an American women's soccer team, founded in 2007. The team was a member of the Women's Premier Soccer League, the third tier of women's soccer in the United States and Canada, until 2010. The team played in the North Division of the Big Sky Conference.

The team played its home games at Murphey Field on the campus of the University of Arizona in Tucson, Arizona. The club's colors were royal blue and white.

== Year-by-year ==
Year	Division	League	Reg. season	Playoffs
2008	3	WPSL	2nd, Big Sky North	National Final
2009	3	WPSL	1st, Big Sky North	Conference Final
2010	3	WPSL	2nd, Big Sky North	

== Notable former players ==
The following former players have played at the senior international and/or professional level:

- (Republic of Ireland) Sylvia Gee

== Honors ==
- WPSL Big Sky Conference Champions 2008

== Coaches ==
- (United States) Chris Fernandez 2008–present

== Stadia ==
- Murphey Field, Tucson, Arizona 2008–present
