= SD United (WPSL) =

San Diego United
- Full name: San Diego United Futbol Club
- Founded: 2007
- Ground: Torero Stadium
- Capacity: 6,000
- Chairman: (United States) Laura Corbisez
- Manager: (Italy) Elio Bello
- League: Women's Premier Soccer League
- 2008: 3rd, Pacific South Division
Home colors	Away colors

San Diego United was an American women's soccer team San Diego, California, that competed in the Women's Premier Soccer League (WPSL), the third tier of women's soccer in the United States and Canada. The United played in the South Division of the Pacific Conference. The team played its home games at Torero Stadium. The club's colors were white, scarlet, black and gold.

The team was a sister organization of the men's San Diego United team, which played in the National Premier Soccer League.

== Year-by-year ==
Year	Division	League	Reg. season	Playoffs
2008	3	WPSL	3rd, Pacific South	Did not qualify

== Coaches ==
- (Italy) Elio Bello 2008–present

== Stadia ==
- Torero Stadium; San Diego, California 2009–present
