= Monterey Blues =

- Full name: Monterey Blues
- Nickname: Blues
- Founded: 2007
- Ground: Monterey Peninsula College
- Chairman: (United States) Rachel Petlowany
- Manager: (Saudi Arabia) Khalid Al-Rasheed
- League: Women's Premier Soccer League
- 2008: 6th, Pacific North Division
Home colors	Away colors

Monterey Blues was an American women's amateur soccer team. Founded in 2007, the team was a member of the Women's Premier Soccer League, the then third tier of women's soccer in the United States and Canada. The team played in the North Division of the Pacific Conference.

The team played its home games in the stadium on the campus of Monterey Peninsula College in Monterey, California. The team's colors were black and red. After two seasons in the WPSL, the team folded following the 2009 season.

== Players ==
=== Current roster ===
Note: Flags indicate national team as defined under FIFA eligibility rules; some limited exceptions apply. Players may hold more than one non-FIFA nationality.

No.	Pos.	Nation	Player
—		USA	Carrianne Andrews
—		USA	Olivia Austin
—		USA	Mikaela Bozzo
—		USA	Gabrielle Bozzo
—		USA	Erin Brunelle
—		USA	Annie Busch
—		USA	Sydney Busch
—		USA	Heather Couch
—		USA	Heather Emswiler
—		USA	Margaret Evans
—		USA	Hannah Fliesler
—		USA	Christina Gilbert
—		USA	Frances Gollnick
—		USA	Courtney Hermann
—		USA	Coral Hoover
—		USA	Lisa Lahman
—		USA	Anne Lee
—		USA	Monica McNeil

No.	Pos.	Nation	Player
—		USA	Caitlin Meadows
—		USA	Dulce Meza
—		USA	Morgan Miller
—		USA	Leah Morales
—		USA	Leslie Muirhead
—		USA	Cristin Murphy
—		USA	Esther Neel
—		USA	Jacqueline Nicora
—		USA	Rachel Petlowany
—		USA	Jessica Rodriguez
—		USA	Annika Rose
—		USA	Jessica Sanchez
—		USA	Emily Scheese
—		USA	Sierra Schlesinger
—		USA	Cheri Schwanke
—		USA	Laura Schwartz
—		USA	Jane Shook
—		USA	Briana Wiles

== Year-by-year ==
Year	Division	League	Reg. season	Playoffs
2008	3	WPSL	6th, Pacific North	Did not qualify
2009	3	WPSL	3rd, Pacific North	Did not qualify

== Coaches ==
- (Saudi Arabia) Khalid Al-Rasheed 2008–2009

== Stadia ==
- Stadium at Monterey Peninsula College; Monterey, California 2008–2009
