= San Diego WFC SeaLions =

- Full name: San Diego Women's Football Club SeaLions
- Nickname: SeaLions
- Founded: 1988; 38 years ago
- Dissolved: 2019; 7 years ago
- Stadium: Manchester Stadium
- Chairman: Lu Snyder
- Coach: Jen Lalor
- League: Women's Premier Soccer League
Home colors	Away colors

San Diego WFC SeaLions was an American women's soccer team based in San Diego, California. It was founded in 1988 with the local Peninsula Soccer League and originally called the "Has-Beens". The Has-Beens went on to win the Peninsula championship that year. In 1997, Auto Trader Publications became the team's first commercial sponsor and changed the team name to Auto Trader Women's Select and later San Diego Auto Trader. The team was invited to tour Europe to face clubs in Germany, Hungary, and Italy where they went 4-0.

The team became a founding member of the Women's Premier Soccer League, the second tier of women's soccer in the United States and Canada, finishing in 2nd place. The next year they traveled to Mexico City to play two games against the Mexico national team, helping it prepare for the 1999 FIFA Women's World Cup. They won the Las Vegas Silver Mug Tournament with an 8-0 record, allowing only 1 goal. After beating Las Virgines and the So Cal Blues for the California State Cup title, they then traveled to St. Louis where they won the U.S. National Cup over New Jersey's Patrick Real Wykoff in a 14-0 win. Capping-off the year with another 2nd place finish in the WPSL.

In 2000, the San Diego Auto Traders changed their name to San Diego WFC and went on to win their first WPSL Championship. Due to their success, they became a sponsored team of the Women's United Soccer Association's San Diego Spirit. They won another Las Vegas Silver Mug title and took second place in the WPSL despite losing several players to the Spirit the following year. In 2002, the San Diego WFC becomes the SD Spirit's "developmental squad," and scrimmaged the U.S. Under-16, Under-19, and Under-21 Women's National Teams.

By 2006 and led by United States national team member Jen Lalor-Neilsen, Chinese national team captain Zhang Ouying, and Irish national team member Sarah Halpenny, the SeaLions advanced to the WPSL's first Final Four Tournament, held in Salt Lake City, UT.

The team played its home games at Manchester Stadium on the campus of Cathedral Catholic High School. The club's colors were sky blue, royal blue and white.

The team folded after the 2019 season.

== Year-by-year ==
Year	Division	League	Reg. season	Playoffs
1998	2	WPSL	2nd	n/a
1999	2	WPSL	2nd	n/a
2000	2	WPSL	1st	Champion via Reg. Season
2001	2	WPSL	2nd	n/a
2005	2	WPSL	4th, West	
2006	2	WPSL	2nd, West	Lost in WPSL Semi-finals
2007	2	WPSL	2nd, West	did not qualify
2008	2	WPSL	5th, Pacific South	did not qualify
2009	2	WPSL	5th, Pacific South	did not qualify
2010	2	WPSL	3rd, Pacific South	did not qualify
2011	2	WPSL	2nd, Pacific South	Lost in Regional Final
2012	2	WPSL	1st, Pacific South	Lost in Regional Final
2013	2	WPSL	1st, Pacific South	WPSL Champions
2014	2	WPSL	3rd, Pacific South	did not qualify
2015	2	WPSL	2nd, Pacific South	Lost in Regional Semi-finals
2016	2	WPSL	1st, Pacific South	Lost in WPSL Finals
2017	2	WPSL	1st, Pacific South	Lost in WPSL Semi-finals
2018	2	WPSL	5th, Pacific South	did not qualify
2019	2	WPSL	1st, Pacific South	Lost in Regional Semi-finals

== Honors ==
- WPSL Champions 2000
- WPSL Champions 2013

== Competition history ==
San Diego W.F.C. was formed in 1988 to give post college players a place to play competitive soccer. WFC was one of original 6 WPSL teams, known as Auto Trader then. The WFC has sent at least 7 players to the WUSA. In 2004 San Diego WFC, Inc., a 501(c)(3) organization was created to develop, and maintain a full-service soccer program, providing playing and training opportunities, coaching, instruction and learning opportunities, and offering soccer program administration opportunities, for females of all ages in under-served areas of San Diego. Also in 2004, WFC has created a close relationship with the Fusion Soccer Club, a girls only competitive club based in Santee.

San Diego WFC has won numerous titles including:

- 2013 WPSL National Champions
- 2001 Las Vegas Silver Mug Invitational Champions
- 2000 WPSL League Champions
- 2000 Arizona Copper Cup Championship
- 1999 USASA National Champions Cup
- 1999 California State Cup Champions
- 1999 Las Vegas Silver Mug Invitational Champions
- 1996 Las Vegas Silver Mug Invitational Champions
- 1988 Peninsula Soccer League Champions

== Coaches ==
- (United States) Jen Lalor-Neilsen -2010–Present
- (England) Paul Dougherty 2009
- (United States) Sean Bowers 2006-2008

== Stadia ==
- Manchester Stadium; San Diego, California -present
