= California Storm =

American women's soccer club

- Full name: California Storm
- Nickname: Storm
- Founded: 1995
- Stadium: Davis Legacy Sports Complex; Davis, California
- Capacity: 11,569
- Head Coaches: Sissi, David Robertson
- League: Women's Premier Soccer League and USL W League
- Website: http://www.calstormsoccer.com
Home colors	Away colors

California Storm is an American women's soccer team, founded in 1995 as the Sacramento Storm, before changing its name the following season. The team is a member of the Women's Premier Soccer League and the USL W League, both semi-professional women's leagues in the United States. The team plays in the North Division of the Pacific Conference in the WPSL and in the NorCal Division for the USL W League. The team was a founding member of the W-League, then left in 1998 to become one of the founding teams of the WPSL. It returned in 2022 and will field a team in both leagues.

The team plays its home games in the stadium of Davis Legacy Sports Complex in Davis, California but considers Sacramento, California its home and regularly holds free soccer clinics throughout the region. The club's colors are white and navy blue.

The California Storm have won the PacNorth Conference eight times, including 2016, 2017, 2019, and 2023. They have won a WPSL record of 4 National Championships (1999, 2002, 2004 and 2022). Their 2020 WPSL season was cancelled due to the pandemic but in that time, they added new sponsors, signed with Puma, and started a U-21 team, which eventually became their WPSL team. The semi-professional team will look to become the only team to hold championships in both the USL W League and WPSL within the upcoming years.

== Year-by-year ==
=== USL W-League/WPSL ===
Year	Division	League	Reg. season	Playoffs
Sacramento Storm
1995	2	W-League	3rd, Western	Runner up
California Storm
1996	2	W-League	4th, Western	did not qualify
1997	2	W-League	1st, Western	Runner up
1998	2	WPSL	3rd	No playoff
1999	2	WPSL	1st	Champions
2000	2	WPSL	2nd	Runner up
2001	2	WPSL	3rd	National Semifinal
2002	2	WPSL	1st, North	Champions
2003	2	WPSL	1st, North	Runner up
2004	2	WPSL	2nd, North	Champions
2005	2	WPSL	1st, West	Runner up
2006	2	WPSL	3rd, West	did not qualify
2007	2	WPSL	3rd, West	did not qualify
2008	2	WPSL	1st, Pacific North	Conference Semifinals
2009	2	WPSL	1st, Pacific North	Conference Finals
2010	2	WPSL	1st, Pacific North	National Quarterfinals
2011	2	WPSL	3rd, Pacific North	did not qualify
2012	2	WPSL	5th, Pacific North	did not qualify
2013	2	WPSL	6th, Pacific North	did not qualify
2014	2	WPSL	1st, Pacific North	Regional Final
2015	2	WPSL	1st, Pacific North	Did not play
2016	2	WPSL	1st, NorCal	Conference Semifinal
2017	2	WPSL	1st, Pacific North	Divisional Final
2018	2	WPSL	3rd, Pacific North-Bay Area	did not qualify
2019	2	WPSL	1st, Pacific North-Bay Area	Regional Final
2020	4	WPSL	Season cancelled due to COVID-19	
2021	4	WPSL	2nd, Group F	did not qualify
2022	4	WPSL	1st, Group F	Champions
2023	4	WPSL	1st, Pac North	Region Finals
2024	4	WPSL	1st, Pac Cal	Champions
2025	4	WPSL	1st, NorCal	Runner up
2026	4	WPSL	1st, Sacramento Valley	National Semifinals

=== USL W League ===
Year	Division	League	Reg. season	Playoffs
2023	4	USLW	3rd, Nor Cal	Conference Finals
2024	4	USLW	1st, Nor Cal	Conference Semifinals
2025	4	USLW	5th, Nor Cal	did not qualify
2026	4	USLW	2nd, Nor Cal	did not qualify

== Current squad ==
As of 31 March 2020.

Note: Flags indicate national team as defined under FIFA eligibility rules; some limited exceptions apply. Players may hold more than one non-FIFA nationality.

No.	Pos.	Nation	Player
00	GK	USA	Abbie Faingold
1	GK	NGA	Yewande Balogun
2	MF	USA	Geneve Dromensk
4	DF	USA	Riley West
7		USA	Alexis Wallace
9		USA	Andrea Damien
10		USA	Sissi Amor
11		USA	Kaitlin Prothe
12		USA	Mackenzie George
13		USA	Ashlee Schouten
14		USA	Katie Hardeman
15		USA	Mikayla Reed
16		USA	Sabrina Williamson
17		USA	Janea Packard
20		USA	Aubrey Goodwill
21		USA	Haylee Degrood
22		USA	Katelyn Chandler

No.	Pos.	Nation	Player
24		USA	Devlyn Jeter
25		USA	Haylee Bettencourt
26		USA	Bailey Kern
28		USA	Cassandra Hermman
29		USA	Sydney Schultz
31		USA	Bradlee DeShane
33	MF	USA	Larissa Ala
—	GK	USA	Brittany Cameron
—	GK	USA	Katelin Talbert
—	DF	USA	Kandace Wilson
—	FW	USA	Bev Yanez
—		USA	Emma Hasco
—		USA	Laura Hernandez
—		USA	Amber Jackson
—		USA	Kandace Love
—		USA	Janessa Staab

== Former notable players ==
- Alex Morgan
- Remy Siemsen
- Brandi Chastain
- Leslie Osborne
- Sissi
- Julie Foudy
- Jennifer Cudjoe
- Jessika Cowart

== Honours ==
- WPSL Pacific North Division Champions 2008, 2009, 2010, 2014, 2015, 2017, 2019, 2023
- WPSL Pacific NorCal Division Champions 2016
- WPSL West Division Champions 2005
- WPSL North Division Champions 2002, 2003
- WPSL Regular Season Champions 1999
- W-League Western Division Champions 1997
- WPSL Champions 2022
- WPSL Champions 2004
- WPSL Champions 2002
- WPSL Champions 1999

== Head coaches ==
- (United States) Jerry Zanelli (1995–2018)
- (United States) Jamie Levoy (2019–present)

== Stadia ==
Elk Grove High School 2014

- Stadium at Natomas High School; Sacramento, California 2008–2010
- Stadium at Esperanza High School; Anaheim, California 2008 (1 game)
- Stadium at Inderkum High School; Sacramento, California 2008 (2 games)

== Front office ==
=== Board of directors ===
Executive Director and Head Coach	Jamie Levoy
Board Member	Brandi Chastain
Board Member	Nick Hardeman
Board Member	Dan Howard
Board Member	David Levoy
Board Member	Leslie Osborne
