= Ohio Premier Women's SC =

- Full name: Ohio Premier Women's Soccer Club
- Nickname: OP
- Founded: 2007
- Dissolved: 2012
- Ground: Dublin Scioto HS Stadium
- Chairman: (United States) Michael Zazon
- Manager: (United States) Kevin Dougherty (United States) Willie Gage
- League: Women's Premier Soccer League
- 2008: 2nd, Midwest Conference
Home colors	Away colors

Ohio Premier Women's SC was an American women's soccer team, founded in 2007. The team was a member of the Women's Premier Soccer League. The team played in the Mid Atlantic Conference.

The team played its home games at Dublin Scioto High School Stadium. The club's colors were white and black.

After the 2012 season, the Ohio Premier Women's SC dissolved, but Ohio Premier continues to run its youth soccer program.

== Year-by-year ==
Year	Division	League	Reg. season	Playoffs
2008	3	WPSL		'

== Coaches ==
- (United States) Kevin Dougherty 2008–present
- (United States) Willie Gage 2008–present
