= Ajax America Women =

- Full name: Ajax America Women; Ajax Sportsklubben Fram
- Founded: mid-1970s
- Stadium: Nansen Field
- League: Women's Premier Soccer League
- 2012: 3rd, Pacific South Division
Home colors	Away colors

Ajax America Women is an American women's soccer team, founded in the mid-1970s by Fred Van Soest. Fred Van Soest went to the Netherlands and spoke with the Amsterdam Football Club Ajax (AFC Ajax) and asked if he could use their name and logo for a US women's soccer team and they agreed. In 1985, Ajax women's team was the first women's team to play in international companion in Brazil; they took 2nd to West Germany.

The team is now a member of the Women's Premier Soccer League, the second tier of women's soccer in the United States and Canada. The team plays in the South Division of the Pacific Conference, their home stadium being Nansen Field in the city of Rolling Hills Estates, California, 15 miles south of downtown Los Angeles. The team's colors are navy blue and white. Ajax women from America. During the 1980s, a student named Queen was an Ajax player and attended the University of California, Los Angeles. Queen thinks UCLA could give the women's soccer team varsity status without spending any money. According to her and volunteer coach Afshin Ghotbi, the only club sport at UCLA without a women's soccer team .While softball and baseball are gender-specific alternatives, the school offers both men's and women's teams in sports including basketball and tennis. Ajax recently represented the U.S. Soccer Federation at the "Little World Cup" tournament in Rio de Janeiro. Lou Kaufman, an engineer and aerospace program manager who played soccer at West Point and is now attending UCLA, is also involved with the team.

== Year-by-year ==
Year	Division	League	Reg. season	Playoffs	National Cup
1998					Champions
1999					
2000					Champions
2001	2	WPSL		Champions	
2002	2	WPSL			
2003	2	WPSL			Champions
2004	2	WPSL			Champions
2005	2	WPSL	2nd, West		
2006	2	WPSL	1st, West		
2007	2	WPSL	1st, West	National Semifinals	Champions
2008	2	WPSL	2nd, Pacific South	Champions	
2009	2	WPSL	1st, Pacific South	National Final	
2010	2	WPSL	1st, Pacific South	National Final	
2011	2	WPSL	3rd, Pacific South	Did not qualify	
2012	2	WPSL	3rd, Pacific South	Did not qualify	
2013	2	WPSL	4th, Pacific South	Did not qualify	

== Honors ==
- WPSL Champions
  - Winners (2): 2001, 2008
  - Runners-up (2): 2009, 2010
- USASA National Women's Cup
  - Winners (5): 1998, 2000, 2003, 2004, 2007
- USASA National Women's Amateur
  - Winners (2): 1992, 1993
- 2012 Las Vegas Silver Mug Champions
- 2013 Las Vegas Silver Mug Champions

== Coaches ==
- 1996-2010 Brian Boswel
- 1998-2012 Kenyon Lohn
- 2016 Romeo Aguinaldo
- 2017–Present Jack Gidney

== Stadium ==
- Nansen Field; Rolling Hills Estates, California 2000–present
