= Chicago United Breeze =

American soccer team

- Full name: Chicago United Breeze
- Nickname: Breeze
- Founded: 2006
- Ground: Harry D. Jacobs HS Stadium
- Manager: Dwayne Cruz
- League: Women's Premier Soccer League
- 2009: 4th, Midwest Conference
Home colors	Away colors

Chicago United Breeze was an American women's soccer team, founded in 2006. The team was a member of the Women's Premier Soccer League, the second tier of women's soccer in the United States of America and Canada. The team played in the Midwest Conference.

The team played its home games in the stadium on the campus of Harry D. Jacobs High School in the city of Algonquin, Illinois, 45 miles north-west of downtown Chicago. The club's colors were royal blue, white and black.

== Players ==
=== Current roster ===
♯15/ #14 Davis, LaShaeē forward Chicago, IL Harold L. Richards

=== Notable former players ===
The following former players also played at the senior international and/or professional level:

- (Republic of Ireland) Sylvia Gee

== Year-by-year ==
Year	Division	League	Reg. season	Playoffs
2007	2	WPSL	5th, Midwest	Did not qualify
2008	2	WPSL	4th, Midwest	Did not qualify
2009	2	WPSL	4th, Midwest	It looks like they only played 5 games?

== Coaches ==
- (United States) Dwayne Cruz -present

== Stadia ==
- Stadium at Harry D. Jacobs High School, Algonquin, Illinois -present
