= New England Mutiny =

Women's soccer club based in Ludlow, Massachusetts

- Founded: 1999 (27 years ago)
- Stadium: Lusitano Stadium; Ludlow, Massachusetts
- League: USL W League & United Women's Soccer
- 2025: United Women's Soccer; East Conference: 1st of 12; Playoffs: Runners-up
- Website: mutinysoccer.com

The New England Mutiny are a women's soccer club based in Ludlow, Massachusetts. They compete in the USL W League, in the amateur level of the United States league system, and play their home games at Lusitano Stadium. Founded in 1999 as the Springfield Sirens, the club commenced play in the original incarnation of the W League, before moving to the Women's Premier Soccer League in 2003, and joining a secession of WPSL clubs to become a founding member of United Women's Soccer in 2016. The Mutiny returned to the W League in 2026.

== History ==
Established in 1999 as Springfield Sirens, the club played in the amateur W-League. After winning the W-2 (second division) championship in 2000, the club played one more season in the W-League, then a season as an exhibition team before changing the team name to the New England Mutiny and accepting promotion to WPSL as one of the founding members of the East Division. On July 29, 2004, in a match preparing women's national team of China for international tournament, the Mutiny surprised the fifth ranked team in the world, in front of 3000 fans in Agawam, Massachusetts, with a 3–1 lead, and losing 4–3 only in the final minutes. The Mutiny consider this match one of their two crowning achievements.

After the folding of WPS in 2012, the club joined the new Women's Premier Soccer League Elite, which included three former WPS teams. Although they finished fifth out of the eight WPSLE teams, they recorded wins over the Chicago Red Stars and Boston Breakers as well as a draw at the Western New York Flash – the former WPS teams – in the last month of the season. Their win over the Breakers is the first occurrence of an amateur side beating a professional side in US women's soccer, (Chicago fielded an amateur roster in WPSLE,) and is the second of the Mutiny's crowning achievements. WPSL-Elite lasted just one year as the former WPS teams joined the newly formed National Women's Soccer League, while the remaining teams either folded or, like the Mutiny, returned to the WPSL in 2013. The Mutiny spent three further years in the WPSL, but after dissatisfaction with playoff procedures and handling in the WPSL, the team branched off to join the inaugural 2016 season of United Women's Soccer.

== Team ==
=== Notable former players ===
The following former players have played at the senior international and/or professional level:

- (Republic of Ireland) Sylvia Gee (Springfield Sirens)
- (United States) Ellie Jean
- (Republic of Ireland) Sonya Maher (Springfield Sirens)
- (Republic of Ireland) Geraldine O'Shea (Springfield Sirens)
- (Republic of Ireland) Margaret Saurin (Springfield Sirens)
- (Republic of Ireland) Claire Scanlan (Springfield Sirens)

== Seasons ==
List of New England Mutiny seasons
Season	League	Pld	W	D	L	GF	GA	GD	Pos	Playoffs	Ref
1999	USL-W2	12	9	3	0	27	10	+17	1st of 6	Runners-up	
2000	USL-W2	12	11	1	0	35	19	+16	1st of 6	Champions	
2001	USL-W	14	9	2	3	33	14	+19	4th of 8	DNQ	
2002	Did not play										
2003	WPSL	8	7	0	1	28	5	+23	1st of 4	National semi-finals	
2004	WPSL	10	10	0	0	41	6	+35	1st of 6	Runners-up	
2005	WPSL	13	13	0	0	38	7	31	1st of 8	National semi-finals	
2006	WPSL	10	6	1	3	24	13	+11	3rd of 8	DNQ	
2007	WPSL	10	7	3	0	34	3	+31	1st of 8	Runners-up	
2008	WPSL	12	10	0	2	46	7	+39	2nd of 7	National semi-finals	
2009	WPSL	10	4	0	6	19	14	+5	8th of 14	DNQ	
2010	WPSL	10	3	3	4	17	11	+6	3rd of 6	DNQ	
2011	WPSL	10	4	3	3	10	10	+0	4th of 7	DNQ	
2012	WPSLE	14	6	3	5	25	34	–9	5th of 8	DNQ	
2013	WPSL	10	5	0	5	19	5	+14	1st of 6	National semi-finals	
2014	WPSL	10	4	2	4	31	18	+13	3rd of 6	DNQ	
2015	WPSL	10	8	0	2	22	7	+15	1st of 5	Regional finals	
2016	UWS	10	6	0	4	21	16	+5	2nd of 6	DNQ	
2017	UWS	10	7	0	3	23	10	+13	3rd of 8	DNQ	
2018	UWS	10	4	2	4	19	17	+2	6th of 9	DNQ	
2019	UWS	10	8	2	0	30	7	+23	1st of 8	Conference final	
2020	UWS	Season cancelled									
2021	UWS	10	3	4	3	24	18	+6	8th of 13	DNQ	
2022	UWS	10	9	0	1	27	8	+9	1st of 6	Conference semi-finals	
2023	UWS	8	4	2	2	20	11	+9	6th of 17	Regional semi-finals	
2024	UWS	10	10	0	0	38	4	+34	1st of 18	Runners-up	
2025	UWS	7	7	0	0	23	3	+20	1st of 12	Runners-up	
2026	USLW	10	2	2	6	15	17	–2	4th of 5	Did not qualify	
2026	UWS	Future season									

== Honors ==
- USL W-League 2
  - Winners (1): 2000
  - Runners-up (1): 1999
- Women's Premier Soccer League
  - Runners-up (2): 2004, 2007
- United Women's Soccer
  - Runners-up (2): 2024, 2025
