= MYSC Lady Blues =

- Full name: Middleton Yahara Soccer Club Lady Blues
- Nickname: The Blue Machine
- Founded: 2007
- Ground: Otto Breitenbach Stadium
- Chairman: (United States) Paul Lackner
- Manager: (United States) Ben John
- League: Women's Premier Soccer League
- 2008: 1st, Midwest Conference; Playoff National Semi Finals
Home colors	Away colors

MYSC Lady Blues is an American women's soccer team, founded in 2007. The team is a member of the Women's Premier Soccer League, the third tier of women's soccer in the United States and Canada. The team plays in the Midwest Conference.

The team plays its home games at Otto Breitenbach Stadium in Middleton, Wisconsin, 10 miles north-west of downtown Madison. The club's colors are white and sky blue.

== Players ==
=== Notable former players ===
The following former players have played at the senior international and/or professional level:

- (Republic of Ireland) Sylvia Gee

== Year-by-year ==
Year	Division	League	Reg. season	Playoffs
2008	3	WPSL	1st, Midwest	National Semi Finals

== Honors ==
- WPSL Midwest Conference Champions 2008

== Coaches ==
- (United States) Ben John 2008–present

== Stadia ==
- Otto Breitenbach Stadium, Middleton, Wisconsin 2008–present
