= Puerto Rico Capitals =

Former women's soccer team based in Ponce, Puerto Rico

- Full name: Puerto Rico Capitals Futbol Club
- Nickname: Capitals
- Founded: 2007
- Dissolved: 2010
- Ground: Yldefonso Solá Morales Stadium
- Chairman: Luis A. Murphy
- Manager: Robert Parr
- League: Women's Premier Soccer League
- 2008: 5th, Sunshine Conference
Home colors	Away colors

Puerto Rico Capitals was a women's soccer team based in Ponce, Puerto Rico. They played in the Women's Premier Soccer League (WPSL), the third tier of women's soccer in the United States and Canada, from 2008–2010. The team played in the Sunshine Conference.

The team was established in 2007 as Puerto Rico's first professional women's soccer team. In their inaugural 2008 season they played at Yldefonso Solá Morales Stadium in Caguas, Puerto Rico. The following season they relocated to Ponce. They folded after the 2010 season. The club's colors were pink, royal blue, red and white.

== History ==
The Capitals were founded in 2007, becoming the first professional women's soccer team in Puerto Rico, and the first team in the Women's Premier Soccer League to play outside of the continental United States. The club had a senior WPSL team and a junior U-17 developmental squad. Originally based in Caguas, Puerto Rico, they relocated to the city of Ponce in 2009. They folded after the 2010 season.

== Coaches ==
- Robert Parr 2008–present

== Stadia ==
- Yldefonso Solá Morales Stadium, Caguas, Puerto Rico 2008–present

== See also ==
- Puerto Rican Football Federation
