= Brevard County Cocoa Expos =

- Full name: Brevard County Cocoa Expos
- Nickname: Expos
- Ground: Cocoa Municipal Stadium
- Capacity: 3,000
- Chairman: (United States) Richard Stottler (United States) Giles Malone
- Manager: (United States) James Kryger
- League: Women's Premier Soccer League
- 2008: 1st, Sunshine Conference; Playoff Conference Finals
Home colors	Away colors

Brevard County Cocoa Expos is an American women's soccer team, founded in 1993. The team is a member of the Women's Premier Soccer League, the third tier of women's soccer in the United States and Canada. The team plays in the Sunshine Conference.

The team plays its home games at the Cocoa Municipal Stadium in Cocoa, Florida. The club's colors are blue and white.

The team used to play in the USL W-League as the Cocoa Expos Women, and were associated with the now defunct men's USL team, Cocoa Expos.

== Players ==
=== Notable former players ===
- (Scotland) Joanne Love
- (New Zealand) Emily McColl
- (Canada) Liz Hansen (2007-9 Doncaster Rovers Belles L.F.C. England)

== Year-by-year ==
Year	Division	League	Reg. season	Playoffs
2006	1	USL W-League	3rd, Atlantic	
2007	1	USL W-League	4th, Atlantic	
2008	2	WPSL	1st, Sunshine	Conference Finals

== Honors ==
- WPSL Sunshine Conference Champions 2008

== Coaches ==
- (United States) James Kryger -present

== Stadia ==
- Cocoa Municipal Stadium, Cocoa, Florida -present
