= Old Panther Field =

Football field in Texas

Coordinates: 32.648447°N 96.901927°W

The Old Panther Field, located in Duncanville, Texas, United States, is the former home of the Duncanville High School Panthers. The field is located at 400 east Freeman street, in Duncanville Texas. It is now the football field for nearby Reed Middle School, which uses the field for community events as well as sports activities. The seating capacity of the field is about 2-3 thousand.
