= Thomasville Dragons =

- Full name: Futbol Club of Thomasville
- Nickname: Dragons
- Founded: 2007
- Ground: Singletary Soccer Complex
- Chairman: (United States) Jim Wiggins
- Manager: (England) Aly Joslin (United States) Rick Zambrano
- League: Women's Premier Soccer League
- 2008: 6th, Sunshine Conference
Home colors	Away colors

Thomasville Dragons was a women's soccer team based in Thomasville, Georgia. They played in the Women's Premier Soccer League, the third tier of women's soccer in the United States and Canada from 2008 to 2010.

The team played in the Sunshine Conference. They played their home games at the Singletary Soccer Complex in Thomasville, Georgia. The club's colors were white and burgundy.

== Year-by-year ==
Year	Division	League	Reg. season	Playoffs
2008	3	WPSL	6th, Sunshine	Did not qualify

== Coaches ==
- (England) Aly Joslin 2008–2010
- (United States) Rick Zambrano 2008–2010

== Stadium ==
- Singletary Soccer Complex, Thomasville, Georgia 2008–2010
