= Margaret Saurin =

Irish association footballer and coach (born 1978)

Personal information
- Date of birth: 3 January 1978 (age 48)
- Place of birth: Dublin, Ireland
- Position: Forward

College career
Years	Team	Apps	(Gls)
2001–2002	Christian Brothers	47	(47)

Senior career*
Years	Team	Apps	(Gls)
–1996	Hamman Celtic		
1996–1999	Shamrock Rovers		
2000	Springfield Sirens		
2000	Fortuna Hjørring		

International career^{‡}
1995–1996	Republic of Ireland U19		
1996–?	Republic of Ireland		

Managerial career
- 2007–2014: IPFW Mastodons
- 2014–2017: Oakland Golden Grizzlies
- * Club domestic league appearances and goals as of 17:13, 5 May 2021 (UTC) ‡ National team caps and goals as of 17:13, 5 May 2021 (UTC)

Margaret Mary Saurin (born 3 January 1978) is an Irish former association football (soccer) player and coach. She played for the Republic of Ireland women's national football team, before playing and coaching soccer for multiple teams in the US.

== Playing career ==
=== Club career ===
Saurin started playing for Hamman Celtic, and in 1996, she joined Shamrock Rovers Ladies. She was part of the Shamrock Rovers team that won the 1997 Ladies FAI Cup, and lost the 1997 Dublin Women's Soccer League Final to Shelbourne Ladies. In 2000, she played for US USL W-League team Springfield Sirens, as one of five Irish players in the Sirens squad, and also for Fortuna Hjørring.

From 2001 to 2002, Saurin played for Christian Brothers. She made 47 appearances for Christian Brothers, scoring 47 goals, and having 64 assists. In the 2001 season, Saurin made 29 assists, which was an NCAA Division II Women's Soccer Championship season record. She was credited with 35 assists in the 2002 season, which broke her own record. She was awarded an All-America spot for the 2001 season, and the Gulf South Conference top player award for the 2002 season.

=== International career ===
In June 1995, Saurin played for Republic of Ireland under-19s in a match against Austria under-19s. She was part of the Republic of Ireland under-19s team that won the 1996 Dana Cup, one of the world's largest youth football tournaments, and was named the tournament's most valuable player. In the same year, she received a callup to the senior squad. She scored a goal on her international debut, playing against Northern Ireland. She represented the Republic of Ireland in qualification matches for the 1999 FIFA Women's World Cup, UEFA Women's Euro 2001, and 2003 FIFA Women's World Cup. She played in the 2003 Algarve Cup tournament in Portugal.

== Coaching career ==
In 2003, Saurin became an assistant coach at Christian Brothers. From 2004 until 2007 she was an assistant coach of the Akron Zips women's soccer team. In 2007, Saurin became head coach of the IPFW Mastodons women's soccer team. She stayed in the role until 2014, when she became head coach of the Oakland Golden Grizzlies women's soccer team. In 2015, Saurin coached Oakland to their first Horizon League Championship. In January 2017, Saurin quit her role with Oakland, and in February 2017, she became an assistant coach of the Dayton Flyers women's soccer team.

== Personal life ==
Saurin is from Dublin, Ireland. She studied administration and marketing at the Dublin Institute of Technology, and later a master's degree in education at Christian Brothers University.
