= Philadelphia Liberty FC =

Philadelphia Liberty
- Full name: Philadelphia Liberty Football Club
- Nickname: Liberty
- Founded: 2006
- Stadium: John A. Farrell Stadium
- Chairman: (Scotland) Matt Driver
- Manager: (Republic of Ireland) Seamus O'Connor
- League: Women's Premier Soccer League
- 2008: 4th, East Mid-Atlantic Division
| Home colors | Away colors |

The Philadelphia Liberty FC is a North American professional soccer team that is based in West Chester, Pennsylvania, United States.

The team's colors are orange and black.

== History ==
Founded in 2006, the Philadelphia Liberty FC plays in the Women's Premier Soccer League (WPSL), a national amateur league at the fourth tier of the American Soccer Pyramid.

The Liberty's home is John A. Farrell Stadium, which they moved into in 2006. The stadium is located on the campus of West Chester University in the Philadelphia suburb of West Chester. The team is owned by Team Dynamics LLC, an organization involved in soccer education and player development, which also operates the Atlantic City Diablos and Central Delaware SA Future.

Prior to the 2007 season, the team was known as the Philadelphia Pirates. In 2009, Team Dynamics LLC became Philadelphia Women's Pro Soccer LLC, and the Philadelphia Independence of Women's Professional Soccer began competing under its ownership in 2010. Also in 2010, the WPSL Philadelphia Liberty was renamed as the Philadelphia Independence, meaning that Philadelphia Women's Pro Soccer LLC now operates two teams named the Philadelphia Independence, one in WPS and one in the WPSL.

== Year-by-year ==
| Year | Division | League | Reg. season | Playoffs |
|---|---|---|---|---|
| 2005 | 2 | WPSL | 4th, East | |
| 2006 | 2 | WPSL | 4th, East South | |
| 2007 | 2 | WPSL | 3rd, East Mid-Atlantic | Did not qualify |
| 2008 | 2 | WPSL | 4th, East Mid-Atlantic | Did not qualify |
| 2009 | 3 | WPSL | 6th, East | 1st Round, Regional Playoffs |
| 2010 | 3 | WPSL | 2nd, East Mid-Atlantic | Did not qualify |

== Coaches ==
- (England) Wayne Grocott (2007)
- (Republic of Ireland) Seamus O'Connor (2009–present)

== Home stadiums ==
- John A. Farrell Stadium (2006–present)
