= Miami Kickers =

- Full name: Miami Kickers
- Nickname: Kickers
- Founded: 2005
- Ground: American Heritage School Stadium
- Chairman: (France) Marc Miceli
- Manager: (France) Marc Miceli
- League: Women's Premier Soccer League
- 2008: 4th, Sunshine Conference
| Home colors | Away colors |

The Miami Kickers were an American women's soccer team based in the Miami metropolitan area. Founded in 2005, the team played in the Women's Premier Soccer League (WPSL) from 2006 to 2010. They played their home games in the stadium on the campus of American Heritage School in Plantation, Florida, 26 miles north of downtown Miami.

The team was founded in 2005, and in 2006 joined the WPSL, on the second tier of women's soccer in the United States and Canada. They were previously known as the Fort Lauderdale Fusion. They spent five seasons in the WPSL, but are not on the league's lists for 2011. The club's colors were white and royal blue.

== Players ==
=== Notable former players ===
- (United States) April Perry — Midfielder; named to the WPSL 1st All-Star Team in 2009 after finishing as one of the league's leading scorers, with seven goals and one assist in nine appearances.

== Year-by-year ==
| Year | Division | League | Reg. season | Playoffs |
|---|---|---|---|---|
| 2006 | 2 | WPSL | 5th, Southern South | |
| 2007 | 2 | WPSL | 5th, Southern South | Did not qualify |
| 2008 | 2 | WPSL | 4th, Sunshine | Did not qualify |
| 2009 | 2 | WPSL | 1st, Sunshine | Semi-finals |
| 2010 | 2 | WPSL | 3rd, Sunshine | Did not qualify |

== Competition history ==
The Miami Kickers first competed in the WPSL in 2006 under the name Fort Lauderdale Fusion, entering the league's South Division. Prior to the 2007 season, the club was renamed the Miami Kickers.

In their best season, 2009, the Kickers won the Sunshine Division with a record of seven wins, one loss, and two draws, earning 23 points. They advanced past the Eastern Finals, defeating Ohio Premier Women's SC 2–0, before being eliminated in the WPSL Semi-Finals by Ajax America Women, who won 5–0. The eventual champions, Long Island Fury, defeated Ajax America in the final.

The club folded after the 2010 season and did not participate in the WPSL for 2011.

== Coaches ==
- (France) Marc Miceli - (2005–2010).

== Stadium ==
- Stadium at American Heritage School, Plantation, Florida
