= San Francisco Nighthawks =

American women's soccer team

- Full name: San Francisco Nighthawks
- Nickname: Nighthawks
- Founded: 1995; 31 years ago
- Stadium: Kezar Stadium
- Capacity: 10,000
- Chairman: Richard Cross
- Manager: Jill Lounsbury
- League: Women's Premier Soccer League (WPSL)
- 2022: WPSL PAC North Conference Northern Division, 3rd of 7
| Home colors | Away colors |

San Francisco Nighthawks is a women's soccer team based in San Francisco, California, United States. Founded in 1995, the team is a member of the Women's Premier Soccer League (WPSL), the second tier of women's soccer in the United States, and plays in the Northern Division of the PAC North Conference.

The team plays its home games at Kezar Stadium in San Francisco.

== Seasons ==
As of July 26, 2025

| Year | League | Reg. season | Playoffs |
|---|---|---|---|
| 1995 | USL W-League | 2nd, Western Division | DNQ |
| 1996 | USL W-League | 5th, Western Conference | DNQ |
| 1997 | USL W-League | 5th, Western Conference | DNQ |
| 1998 | WPSL | 4th, First Division | DNQ |
| 1999 | WPSL | 5th, First Division | DNQ |
| 2000 | WPSL | 8th | DNQ |
| 2001 | WPSL | 6th | DNQ |
| 2002 | WPSL | 5th, North Division | DNQ |
| 2003 | WPSL | 5th, North Division | DNQ |
| 2004 | WPSL | 6th, North Division | DNQ |
| 2005 | WPSL | 7th, West Division | DNQ |
| 2006 | WPSL | 6th, West Conference | DNQ |
| 2007 | WPSL | 6th, West Conference | DNQ |
| 2008 | WPSL | 3rd, North Division, Pacific Conference | DNQ |
| 2009 | WPSL | 3rd, North Division, Pacific Conference | Conference Semifinals |
| 2011 | WPSL | 5th, North Division, Pacific Conference | DNQ |
| 2012 | WPSL | 6th, North Division, Pacific Conference | DNQ |
| 2013 | WPSL | 4th, North Division, Pacific Conference | DNQ |
| 2013 | WPSL | 4th, North Division, Pacific Conference | DNQ |
| 2014 | WPSL | | DNQ |
| 2015 | WPSL | 4th, North Division, Pacific Conference | DNQ |
| 2016 | WPSL | 4th, NorCal Division | DNQ |
| 2017 | WPSL | 3rd, NorCal Division | DNQ |
| 2018 | WPSL | 2nd, NorCal Division | DNQ |
| 2019 | WPSL | 2nd, NorCal Division | DNQ |
| 2020 | Season cancelled due to COVID-19 | | |
| 2021 | WPSL | 4th, Group F | DNQ |
| 2022 | WPSL | 3rd, Group F | DNQ |
| 2023 | WPSL | 4th, Pac North | DNQ |
| 2024 | WPSL | 3rd, Pac North | Regional Semifinals |
| 2025 | WPSL | 6th, NorCal | did not qualify |
