= Walnut Creek Power =

- Full name: Walnut Creek Power
- Nickname: Power
- Founded: 2007
- Stadium: Las Lomas HS Stadium
- Chairman: Ernesto Silva
- Manager: Ernesto Silva
- League: Women's Premier Soccer League
- 2008: 4th, Pacific North Division
Home colors	Away colors

Walnut Creek Power is an American women's soccer team, founded in 2007. The team is a member of the Women's Premier Soccer League, the third tier of women's soccer in the United States and Canada. The team plays in the North Division of the Pacific Conference.

The team plays its home games in the stadium at Las Lomas High School in the city of Walnut Creek, California, 18 miles northeast of downtown Oakland. The team's colors are white, black and royal blue.

Prior to the 2008 season the team was known as Lamorinda East Bay Power.

== Year-by-year ==
Year	Division	League	Reg. season	Playoffs
2005	2	WPSL	8th, West	
2006	2	WPSL	5th, West	
2007	2	WPSL	7th, West	Did not qualify
2008	2	WPSL	4th, Pacific North	Did not qualify

== Coaches ==
- (United States) Ernesto Silva 2005–present

== Stadia ==
- Stadium at Las Lomas High School; Walnut Creek, California -present
- Stadium at Campolindo High School; Moraga, California 2008 (2 games)
