= Denver Diamonds =

- Full name: Denver Diamonds
- Nickname: Diamonds
- Founded: 1996
- Dissolved: 2009
- Stadium: Gates Soccer Complex
- League: Women's Premier Soccer League
- 2009: 3rd, Big Sky North Division
Home colors	Away colors

Denver Diamonds was an American women's soccer team, founded in 1996. In its debut season the team won its USL W-League conference, then finished second four years in succession, before folding after the 2000 season. The team was later a member of the Women's Premier Soccer League, the second tier of women's soccer in the United States and Canada. Starting play in the 2002 season, they went on hiatus in 2005, then folded again after the 2009 season.

The team played its home games at the Gates Soccer Complex in the city of Centennial, Colorado, 15 miles south of downtown Denver. The club's colors were white and black.

== Players ==
=== Notable former players ===
- (Japan) Homare Sawa
- (United States) Dayna Smith

== Year-by-year ==
Year	Division	League	Reg. season	Playoffs
1996	2	W-League	1st, West Region	1st Round
1997	2	W-League	2nd, West Region	Did not qualify
1998	2	W-League	2nd, Central Region	Did not qualify
1999	2	W-League	2nd, Central Region	1st Round
2000	2	W-League	2nd, Central Region	Did not qualify
2002	2	WPSL	2nd, South Region	Did not qualify
2003	2	WPSL	2nd, South Region	Did not qualify
2004	2	WPSL	1st, South Region	Semi-final
2006	2	WPSL	1st, Southern Southwest	Conference Finals
2007	2	WPSL	1st, Southern Southwest	Conference Finals
2008	2	WPSL	4th, Big Sky North	Did not qualify
2009	2	WPSL	3rd, Big Sky North	Did not qualify

== Honors ==
- W-League West Region Champions 1996
- WPSL Southern Southwest Division Champions 2007
- WPSL Southern Southwest Division Champions 2006

== Coaches ==
- (United States) Tom Stone (1996–2000)
- (United States) Scott De Dycker

== Stadia ==
- Gates Soccer Complex in Centennial, Colorado
