= Millburn Magic =

- Full name: Millburn Magic
- Nickname: Magic
- Founded: 2007
- Ground: Robert T. Shields Field
- Capacity: 1,000
- Owner: New Jersey Soccer Group
- Coach: (England) Tom Worthington
- League: Women's Premier Soccer League
- 2011: 9th, East Mid-Atlantic Conference
Home colors	Away colors

Millburn Magic is an American women's soccer team founded in 2007. The team is a member of the Women's Premier Soccer League, the third tier of women's soccer in the United States and Canada. The team plays in the Northeast Atlantic (Mid) Division of the East Conference.

The team plays its home games at Robert T. Shields Field on the campus of Fairleigh Dickinson University's College at Florham in Madison, New Jersey, four miles south-east of downtown Morristown. The club's colors are white and royal blue.

The Magic organization is owned and operated by the New Jersey Soccer Group, a management company for a family of soccer-based companies offering soccer services in New Jersey.

== Players ==
=== Current roster ===
as at May 6, 2015 Note: Flags indicate national team as defined under FIFA eligibility rules; some limited exceptions apply. Players may hold more than one non-FIFA nationality.

No.	Pos.	Nation	Player
0	GK	USA	Lauren Frick
1	GK	USA	Meredith Maguire
2	DF	USA	Mallory Sheer
5	DF	ENG	Becki Tweed
6	DF	USA	Catherine Galgano
7	MF	USA	Katie McDonnell
8	MF	USA	Katy Fissel
9	FW	USA	Jenn DiGioia
10	MF	USA	Allison Wacker
11	MF	USA	Julie Campbell
12	DF	USA	Avery Jackson
13	DF	USA	Rebecca Krakora

No.	Pos.	Nation	Player
14	FW	USA	Laura Zito
15	MF	USA	Laura Kurash
16	DF	USA	Lily Honor
17	MF	USA	Mariam Bestawros
18	MF	USA	Samantha Cicconi
21	FW	USA	Ogechi Ukaegbu
22	MF	USA	Alexa Freguletti
29	MF	USA	Sara Corson
38	MF	ENG	Kelly Sims
39	FW	USA	Monique Plescia
40	FW	JAM	Keassiand Foster

== Year-by-year ==
Year	League	Regular season	Playoffs
2008	WPSL	4th, East Mid-Atlantic	Did not qualify
2009	WPSL	5th, East	Regional runners-up
2010	WPSL	4th, East Mid-Atlantic	Regional quarterfinal
2011	WPSL	9th, East Mid-Atlantic	Did not qualify
2012	WPSL		

== Coaches ==
- (England) Andy Sones (2008–2010)
- (Republic of Ireland) Sean Kiernan (2011–2012)
- (England) Tom Worthington (2012–Present)

== Stadia ==
- Dr. Keith A. Neigel Stadium, Millburn, New Jersey (2008–2009)
- Robert T. Shields Field, Fairleigh Dickinson University (College at Florham), Madison, New Jersey (2010–present)
