= Portland Rain =

- Full name: Portland Rain
- League: Women's Premier Soccer League
Home colors	Away colors

Portland Rain was an American women's soccer team based in Portland, Oregon. The team is a member of the Women's Premier Soccer League, the third tier of women's soccer in the United States and Canada. The team plays in the North Division of the Pacific Conference, with home games throughout the Portland area.

The team was founded in 2000 and dominated the Pacific Coast Soccer League (PCSL) in its first year. In 2001 the team was a provisional member of the USL W-League. The team played 2002 and 2003 in the PCSL.

The Rain, reestablished in 2008, played a 10-match schedule in the WPSL from May to July. Management and day-to-day operation of the Rain during the 2012 season were a joint effort between the Portland Timbers and Rain personnel. For the 2013 season the Portland Timbers were awarded a franchise in the USSF Division 1 National Women's Soccer League named the Portland Thorns FC.

== Players ==
=== Current roster ===
Stacy Ermini

== Year-by-year ==
Year	Division	League	Reg. season	Playoffs
2000	D4	PCSL	1st	N / A
2001	D2	W-League	20th	DNQ
2002	D4	PCSL	3rd	
2003	D4	PCSL	3rd	
2009	D3	WPSL	4th	DNQ
2010	D3	WPSL	4th	DNQ
2011	D3	WPSL	1st	
2012	D3	WPSL	3rd	

== Coaches ==
Monty Hawkins (2000)

General Manager - Mike Smith

Head Coach - Janine Szpara

Assistant Coach - Rochelle Hearns

== Stadium ==
2012 home games were played at Tualatin Hills Park & Recreation District's Howard M. Terpenning Complex.
