= Palm Beach United =

- Full name: Palm Beach United
- Nickname: United
- Founded: 2005
- Manager: Todd L'Herrou
- Coach: Steve Burgess
- League: Women's Premier Soccer League
- 2011: unk, Sunshine Conference
Home colors	Away colors

Palm Beach United was an American women's soccer team based in West Palm Beach, Florida. Founded in 2005, the team played in the Women's Premier Soccer League (WPSL), at the second tier of women's soccer in the United States and Canada. The team played in the Sunshine Conference of the WPSL from 2005 to 2011.

The team was founded by the Palm Beach United Football Club in 2005, but in 2011 was adopted by the Delray Beach Athletic Club. The team's colors were red and white.

== Year-by-year ==
Year	Division	League	Reg. season	Playoffs
2006	2	WPSL	3rd, Southern South	
2007	2	WPSL	3rd, Southern South	Did not qualify
2008	2	WPSL	2nd, Sunshine	Did not qualify

== Coaches ==
- (United States) Brad Partridge 2006; 2008–2010
- (United States) Asaf Lubezky 2007
- (United States) Steve Burgess 2011

== Stadia ==
- Buttonwood Soccer Complex, Lake Worth, Florida 2007
- Stadium at Emerald Cove Middle School, Wellington, Florida 2008 (1 game)
- Stadium at Palm Beach Central High School, West Palm Beach, Florida 2008–2009
- Okaheelee Park, West Palm Beach, Florida 2010
- Lockhart Stadium, Fort Lauderdale, Florida 2011
- Seacrest Soccer Complex, Delray Beach, Florida 2011
