= Bay State Select =

Female football club based in Massachusetts

Bay State Select was a Women's Premier Soccer League (WPSL) soccer club based out of Hingham, Massachusetts. The team began play in 2005, went on hiatus for 2008 and folded after the 2009 season.

== Notable former players ==
- (Brazil) Daniela Alves Lima (2005–2006)

== Year-by-year ==
Year	Division	League	Reg. season	Playoffs	Avg. attendance
2005	1	WPSL	3rd, East		
2006	1	WPSL	5th, East-North Division		
2007	1	WPSL	8th, East-North Division		
2009	1	WPSL	7th, East Division		
