= FSA Freedom =

- Full name: FSA Freedom
- Nickname: Surge
- Founded: 2005
- Dissolved: 2011; 15 years ago
- Stadium: David Maus Toyota Complex
- Capacity: 3,666
- Chairman: (United States) Joe Raymond, Kelly Sisley, Kurt Oetl
- Manager: Kelly Sisley
- League: Women's Premier Soccer League
- 2009: 2nd, Sunshine Conference
Home colors	Away colors

FSA Freedom were an American women's soccer team based in Sanford, Florida from 2005 to 2011. They were a member of the Women's Premier Soccer League, at the second level of the United States soccer pyramid, and played in the Sunshine Conference. They played their home games at David Maus Toyota Complex in Sanford, located 22 miles north of downtown Orlando.

The team was founded in 2005 as the Central Florida Strikers. In 2008 they became the Florida Surge, with the goal of offering a higher level of play for local and other soccer players. They adopted the name FSA Freedom in 2010. The club's colors were white and Carolina blue.

== Year-by-year ==
Year	Division	League	Reg. season	Playoffs
2006	2	WPSL	2nd, Southern South	Did not qualify
2007	2	WPSL	2nd, Southern South	Did not qualify
2008	2	WPSL	3rd, Sunshine	Did not qualify
2009	2	WPSL	2nd, Sunshine	Did not qualify
2010	2	WPSL	1st, Sunshine	Quarterfinals
2011	2	WPSL	7th, Sunshine	Did not qualify

== Coaches ==
Kim Montgomery -present

- (Brazil) Mauricio Ruiz

== Stadia ==
- David Maus Toyota Complex, Sanford, Florida, 2005-2011
