= Claremont Stars =

American women's soccer team

- Full name: Claremont Stars
- Nickname: Stars
- Founded: 2006
- Ground: Claremont HS Stadium
- Chairman: John Hall
- Manager: Carlos Juarez
- League: Women's Premier Soccer League
- 2008: 6th, Pacific South Division
Home colors	Away colors

Claremont Stars is an American women's soccer team, founded in 2006. The team is a member of the Women's Premier Soccer League, the third tier of women's soccer in the United States and Canada. The team plays in the South Division of the Pacific Conference.

The team plays its home games in the stadium on the campus of Claremont High School in the city of Claremont, California, 35 miles east of downtown Los Angeles. The club's colors are black, yellow and red.

== Year-by-year ==
Year	Division	League	Reg. season	Playoffs
2007	2	WPSL	5th, West	Did not qualify
2008	2	WPSL	6th, Pacific South	Did not qualify
2009	2	WPSL	5th, Pacific South	Did not qualify
2010	2	WPSL	4th, Pacific South	Did not qualify
2011	2	WPSL	6th, Pacific South	Did not qualify

== Coaches ==
- (United States) Carlos Juarez 2007–present

== Stadia ==
- Stadium at Claremont High School; Claremont, California 2007–present
