= Sacramento Pride =

American women's soccer team

- Full name: Football Club Sacramento Pride
- Nickname: Pride
- Founded: 2001
- Stadium: Oakmont HS Stadium
- Chairman: David Saykally
- Manager: Danny Cruz
- League: Women's Premier Soccer League
- 2008: 5th, Pacific North Division
| Home colors | Away colors |

Sacramento Pride is an American women's soccer team, founded in 2001. The team is a member of the Women's Premier Soccer League, the third tier of women's soccer in the United States and Canada. The team plays in the North Division of the Pacific Conference. The Pride plays with the California Storm, San Francisco Nighthawks, Walnut Creek Power, Seattle Synergy, Portland Rain FC and the Monterey Blues, also in their division.

There team consists of college and high school students, playing at either Division I or Division II. Its founder, Danny Cruz, describes the team as a semi-professional team in a professional league, as the players are not paid, and the team is not fully financed.

The team plays its home games in the stadium on the campus of Oakmont High School in the city of Roseville, California, 20 miles (32 km) northeast of downtown Sacramento. The team's colors are yellow and royal blue.

The team was formerly known as Elk Grove Pride and Elk Grove United. The team plays at Elk Grove High School in Elk Grove, California.

== Notable former players ==
- (United States) Stephanie Cox
- (United States) Megan Rapinoe

== Year-by-year ==
| Year | Division | League | Reg. season | Playoffs |
|---|---|---|---|---|
| 2005 | 2 | WPSL | 5th, West | |
| 2006 | 2 | WPSL | 7th, West | |
| 2007 | 2 | WPSL | 8th, West | Did not qualify |
| 2008 | 2 | WPSL | 5th, Pacific North | Did not qualify |
