= Maine Tide =

- Full name: Maine Tide
- Nickname: Tide
- Founded: 2007
- Ground: John Boucher Soccer Field
- Chairman: (United States) Cheryl Stokes
- Manager: (United States) Seth Brown
- League: Women's Premier Soccer League
- 2008: 4th, East North Division
Home colors	Away colors

Maine Tide was an American women's soccer team from 2007 to 2011. The team was a member of the Women's Premier Soccer League, the third tier of women's soccer in the United States and Canada. The team played in the North Division of the East Conference.

The team played their home games at John Boucher Soccer Field on the campus of Husson College in Bangor, Maine. The team's colors were sky blue, white and gold.

The team was a sister organization of the men's Maine Sting team, which played in the National Premier Soccer League until folding in 2010.

== Year-by-year ==
Year	Division	League	Reg. season	Playoffs
2008	3	WPSL	4th, East North	Did not qualify

== Coaches ==
- (United States) Seth Brown 2008–present

== Stadia ==
- John Boucher Soccer Field, Portland, Maine 2008–present
