= Oklahoma Alliance =

- Full name: Oklahoma Alliance
- Nickname: Alliance or OAFC
- Founded: 2007
- Ground: Chickasha HS Stadium
- Chairman: (United States) Bill Farrell
- Manager: (United States) Jimmy Hampton
- League: Women's Premier Soccer League
- 2008,2010 & 2011: 1st, Big Sky South Division
Home colors	Away colors

Oklahoma Alliance is an American women's soccer team, founded in 2007. The team is a member of the Women's Premier Soccer League, the second tier of women's soccer in the United States and Canada. The team plays in the South Division of the Big Sky Conference.

In earlier seasons the team played its home games in the stadium on the campus of Chickasha High School in the city of Chickasha, Oklahoma, but the team moved to the pitches of the Edmond Soccer Club in Edmond, Oklahoma—a city in the Oklahoma City metropolitan area. The club's colors are black and white.

== Players ==
2011 Roster

- Jackie Acevedo
- Baily Boulware
- Katie Bykowski
- Jordan Calhoun
- Rachel Cano-Garcia
- Lauren Carter
- Chelsea Cody
- Callie Cooper
- Carmen Davis
- Brook Degaffenreid
- Colleen Dougherty
- Taylor Fain
- Alison Farrell
- Kaylie Garcia
- Alexandria "Dria" Hampton
- Abby Hodgen
- Danielle Hughes
- Alissa Jones
- Kelli Korleski
- Kylie Ann Louw
- Madison Mercado
- Melinda Mercado
- Kira Michelson-Bartlett
- Caitlin Mooney
- Amy Petrekin
- Annika Niemeier
- Addison Tipton
- Jordan White
- Megan Wilkerson
- Annie Zoch

=== Notable former players ===
- Melinda Mercado (Played Professionally in the NWSL)
- Jackie Acevedo (Played Professionally in the WPSL Elite & NWSL)

== Year-by-year ==
Year	Division	League	Reg. season	Playoffs
2008	3	WPSL	1st, Big Sky South	Couldn't attend due to transportation costs
2009	3	WPSL	2nd, Big Sky South	Did not qualify
2010	2	WPSL	1st, Big Sky Champs	Tied for 3rd Nationally in WPSL Final Four
2011	2	WPSL	1st, Big Sky South	Couldn't attend due to travel costs & college callbacks

== Honors ==
- WPSL Big Sky South Division Champions 2008
- WPSL Big Sky Conference Champions 2010-Tied for 3rd in the WPSL national final four tournament.
- Finished the 2011 regular season averaging 4.18 goals scored per game.

== Competition history ==
Most of the teams that the Alliance competes against are from Oklahoma, Arkansas or Texas. The inter-state and border state rivalries between these teams tends to promote "very spirited" competition.

== Coaches ==
- (United States) Jimmy Hampton 2008–2011

== Stadia ==
- Stadium at Chickasha High School, Chickasha, Oklahoma 2008-2009.
- Stadium at Edmond Soccer Club #4 1502 W. Danforth Edmond, OK. 2010-

== Average attendance ==
Approx. 60 people per game average in 2010 & 2011.
