= Maryland Pride =

Former women's soccer team

- Full name: Thunder Soccer Club Maryland Pride
- Founded: 1994
- Stadium: Cedar Lane Park, Howard County
- League: Women's Premier Soccer League

The Maryland Pride was an WPSL club based in Howard County, Maryland.

== History ==
The team changed ownership in mid-season 2007 when the Thunder Soccer Club in Columbia, Maryland took over the team.

The club was originally named the Lady Bays and began play in 1994 when the United Soccer Leagues (USL) organized a pilot season to test the demand for a national women's soccer league. The Lady Bays advanced to the first unofficial national tournament, where they were eliminated by Sacramento, California, the eventual 1994 champion. In 1996, playing as the Pride, the team set a goal of winning the national title. After compiling an 8–1 regular-season record, the Pride rolled to the national title by defeating three opponents by a combined score of 9–0 at the 1996 national championship tournament. Maryland finished an undefeated season in 2001 and won the regular season championship. The Pride have advanced to national playoffs seven times in their 16 years of operation. On January 18, 2011, the team announced that they would not play in 2011 and has been discontinued.

== Year-by-year ==
| Year | League | Conf/ Div | Reg Season | Playoffs |
|---|---|---|---|---|
| 1995 | W-League | Eastern | 4–5, 6th place | |
| 1996 | W-League | Eastern Conference | 9–1, 1st place | W-League Champions |
| 1997 | W-League | Mid-Atlantic | 8–1, 1st place | Won 3rd place game |
| 1998 | W-League | 1, Northern Conference | 10–4, 2nd place | Lost 3rd place game |
| 1999 | W-League | 1, Northern Conference | 10–4, 1st place | Won 3rd place game |
| 2000 | W-League | 1, Northeastern Conference | 9–4–1, 3rd place | |
| 2001 | W-League | 1, Eastern Conference | 13–0–1, 1st place | Lost in semifinal |
| 2002 | W-League | Eastern/Northeast | 7–5–2, 3rd place | |
| 2003 | WPSL | East | 7–2, 2nd place | |
| 2004 | WPSL | East | 2–5, 5th place | |
| 2005 | WPSL | East | 8th place | |
| 2006 | WPSL | East/ South | 5th place | |
| 2007 | WPSL | East/ Mid-Atlantic | 6th place | Did not qualify |
| 2008 | | on hiatus | | |
| 2009 | WPSL | East | 10th place | Did not qualify |
| 2010 | WPSL | East/ Mid-Atlantic | 4th place | Did not qualify |
| 2011 | | on hiatus | | |
