= Massachusetts Stingers =

- Full name: Massachusetts Stingers
- League: Women's Premier Soccer League
| Home colors | Away colors |

Massachusetts Stingers was an American women's soccer team, founded in 2004. The team was a member of the Women's Premier Soccer League, the third tier of women's soccer in the United States and Canada. The team plays in the North Division of the Eastern Conference. The team folded after the 2007 season.

== Year-by-year ==
| Year | Division | League | Reg. season | Playoffs |
|---|---|---|---|---|
| 2005 | 2 | WPSL | 5th, East | |
| 2006 | 2 | WPSL | 4th, East North | |
| 2007 | 2 | WPSL | 5th, East North | Did not qualify |
