= Houston South Select =

South Select
- Full name: South Select
- Founded: 2007
- Ground: San Jacinto College Stadium
- Capacity: 10,000
- Manager: (United States) David DeVerteuil
- League: Women's Premier Soccer League
- 2008: 3rd, Big Sky South Division
Home colors	Away colors

South Select is an American women's soccer team, founded in 2007. The team is a member of the Women's Premier Soccer League, the third tier of women's soccer in the United States and Canada. The team plays in the South Division of the Big Sky Conference.

The team plays its home games in the stadium on the South Campus of San Jacinto College in Houston, Texas. The club's colors are white.

== Year-by-year ==
Year	Division	League	Reg. season	Playoffs
2008	3	WPSL	3rd, Big Sky South	Did not qualify

== Coaches ==
- (United States) David DeVerteuil 2008–present

== Stadia ==
- Stadium at San Jacinto College, Houston, Texas 2008–present
