= Utah Starzz (WPSL) =

- Full name: Utah Starzz
- Nickname: Starzz
- Founded: 1999
- Stadium: Timpview High School Stadium
- Chairman: Kelly Nelson
- Manager: Steve R. Shallenberger
- League: Women's Premier Soccer League
- 2008: 1st, Big Sky North Division; Playoff Conference Finals
Home colors	Away colors

Utah Starzz is an American women's soccer team, founded in 1999. The team is a member of the Women's Premier Soccer League, the third tier of women's soccer in the United States and Canada. The team plays in the North Division of the Big Sky Conference. Prior to the 2009 season, they were known as the Utah Spiders.

The team plays its home games at Timpview High School's stadium in Provo, Utah. The club's colors are yellow, burgundy and black.

== History ==
The team played their first game in May 2000 against the San Francisco Nighthawks.

== Year-by-year ==
Year	Division	League	Reg. season	Playoffs
2000	3	WPSL	3rd	
2001	3	WPSL	5th	
2002	3	WPSL	2nd, North Div.	
2003	3	WPSL	2nd, North Div.	Won WPSL Championship
2004	3	WPSL	1st, North Div.	Lost in WPSL Semifinals
2005	3	WPSL	3rd, West Div.	Did not qualify
2006	3	WPSL	3rd, Southwest Div.	Did not qualify
2007	3	WPSL	3rd, Southwest Div.	Did not qualify
2008	3	WPSL	1st, Big Sky North Div.	Lost in Big Sky Conf. Finals
2009	3	WPSL	4th, Big Sky North Div.	Did not qualify
2010		WPSL	3rd, Big Sky North	
2011		WPSL	2nd, Big Sky North	
2012		WPSL	2nd, Big Sky North	
2013		WPSL	4th, Big Sky North	

== Honors ==
- WPSL Champions 2003
- WPSL North Division Champions 2004
- WPSL Big Sky North Division Champions 2008

== Coaches ==
- (United States) Joanna Barney -2008
- (United States) Mark Graham 2009–present

== Stadiums ==
- Soaring Eagle Stadium, Draper, Utah -2008
- Timpview High School Stadium, Provo, Utah 2009–present

== See also ==
- Utah soccer clubs
