= Tulsa Spirit =

- Full name: Tulsa Spirit
- Nickname: Spirit
- Founded: 2008
- Ground: Case Soccer Complex on the grounds of Oral Roberts University
- Manager: (United States) Ali Adibi
- League: Women's Premier Soccer League
- 2008: 4th, Big Sky South Division
Home colors	Away colors

Tulsa Spirit is an American women's soccer team, founded in 2008. The team is a member of the Women's Premier Soccer League, the third tier of women's soccer in the United States and Canada. The team plays in the North bracket of the Southwest Division. On Feb.21, 2014 the Major Arena Soccer League team the Tulsa Revolution (men's) announced the formation of a partnership with the Tulsa Spirit. That partnership dissolved following the folding of the Revolution.

The team plays its home games at the Case Soccer Complex at Oral Roberts University in the city of Tulsa, Oklahoma. The club's colors are red, white and blue.

== Year-by-year ==
Year	Division	League	Reg. season	Playoffs
2008	3	WPSL	4th, Big Sky South	Did not qualify
2010	2	WPSL	4th, Big Sky South	Did not qualify

== Coaches ==
- (United States) Head Coach Ali Adibi Asst. Coach Paldin Khodabandeh 2014-2016

== Stadia ==
- Case Soccer Complex at Oral Roberts University, Tulsa, Oklahoma 2015–present
