= Boston Aztec (WPSL) =

- Full name: Boston Aztec
- Nickname: Aztec
- Founded: 2005
- Stadium: Endicott College
- Capacity: 2000
- Chairman: (United States) Mike Kersker
- Manager: (United States) Brandon Nelson
- Coach: (United States) Mike Kersker
- League: Women's Premier Soccer League
- 2010: 2010 WPSL National Champions
Home colors	Away colors

Boston Aztec is an American amateur soccer team based in Beverly, Massachusetts, United States. Founded in 2005, the team plays in Women's Premier Soccer League (WPSL), a national amateur league at the second tier of the American Soccer Pyramid.

In 2009, the Boston Aztec became the reserve team to the WPS Boston Breakers. The Breakers team has loan agreements in place for players to compete with the Boston Aztec in WPSL matches. The Boston Aztec players also train with the Boston Breakers staff. The Boston Aztec roster is composed entirely of post-college players. In 2010, the Boston Aztec enter a U23 team into the WPSL which is entirely made up of college players and is not connected to the Boston Breakers.

In 2012, the Aztec went 10-2-1 for the season and reached the WPSL final. They lost to the Gulf Coast Texans (now Pensacola FC) in the final.

Aztec's home is Endicott College, located in the city of Beverly, MA. The team is operated by the Aztec Soccer Club, which also operates a National Premier Soccer League team called Boston Aztec. The team's colors are red and white. The U23 colors are red and black.

== Year-by-year ==
Year	Division	League	Reg. season	Playoffs
2005	2	WPSL	7th, East	
2006	2	WPSL	7th, East North	
2007	2	WPSL	6th, East North	Did not qualify
2008	2	WPSL	3rd, East North	Did not qualify
2009	2	WPSL	1st(tied), East	#2 seed in playoffs, upset by #3 Lancaster Inferno
2010	2	WPSL	1st, East- Northeast Division	#1 seed in East playoffs, defeated Long Island Fury in East Final, 2010 WPSL National Champions, defeating Ajax America in Dallas, TX
2011	2	WPSL	3rd, East- Northeast Division	''Breakers Reserves #3 seed in East playoffs, defeated ASA Chesapeake Charge in East Final, 2011 WPSL East Champions, lost to Chicago Red Starts in National Semi-Finals in Chicago, IL Aztec U23 #1 seed in East playoffs, defeated by Breakers Reserves in East Semi-Finals

== Honors ==
2011 First Team ALL-WPSL

- (United States) Megan Mischler Boston Aztec Breakers Reserves

2011 WPSL East Player of the Year

- (United States) Megan Mischler Boston Aztec Breakers Reserves

2010 WPSL Final Four MVP

- (Australia) Leah Blayney Boston Aztec Breakers Reserves

2010 First Team ALL-WPSL

- (Australia) Leah Blayney Boston Aztec Breakers Reserves
- (United States) Anna Caniglia Boston Aztec Breakers Reserves

2010 Second Team ALL-WPSL

- (United States) Jess Luscinski Boston Aztec U23
- (England) Kelly Lawrence Boston Aztec Breakers Reserves
- (United States) Katherine Donnelly Boston Aztec U23

== Head coaches ==
- (United States) Dushawne Simpson (2005–2008)
- (United States) Meotis Erikson (2009)
- (United States) Rebekah Splaine (2009)
- (United States) Mike Kersker Breakers Reserves (2010–present)
- (United States) Dushawne Simpson Boston Aztec U23 (2010–present)

== Home stadiums ==
- Salem State College, (2005–2006)
- UMass Lowell, (2007)
- Amesbury Sports Park, (2008–2009)
- Endicott College, (2010)
