= Flower City 1872 =

Women's soccer club in Rochester, New York

- Founded: March 2023; 3 years ago
- Ground: Rochester Community Sports Complex Stadium; Rochester, New York
- Manager: Brennan Shanahan
- Coach: Antonio La Gamba
- League: USL W League
- 2024: United Women's Soccer; Eastern Conference, 9th

Flower City 1872 is a semi-professional women's soccer club based in Rochester, New York that competes in the USL W League (USLW), underneath the three sanctioned tiers of the United States league system. They are the sister club of Flower City Union, and play their home games at the Rochester Community Sports Complex Stadium. Its name and crest are a tribute to the women's suffrage movement activist Susan B. Anthony.

First playing in the 2023 season of United Women's Soccer (UWS) as a replacement for the Rochester Lady Lancers, Flower City 1872 spent two seasons in the UWS, before moving to the USLW in its 2025 season, where it currently competes in the Great Forest Division of the Central Conference.

== History ==
Ahead of its 2023 season, Flower City Union were granted membership in United Women's Soccer (UWS), replacing the Rochester Lady Lancers, who folded after a six-year tenure in the league. The branding for their new women's team to compete in the league, Flower City 1872, was unveiled at a press event held outside the Susan B. Anthony House & Museum in Rochester in March. Former Lady Lancers head coach Adam Schwartz was brought on as 1872's first ever head coach, while former Union midfielder Matt Bolduc joined as an assistant coach. Flower City 1872 played in UWS' 2024 season, before departing for the USL W League (USLW) ahead of its 2025 season.

== Identity ==
The club's crest features a silhouette of Susan B. Anthony, a prominent women's suffrage movement activist from Rochester. Its name, Flower City 1872, references the 1872 presidential election in which she illegally voted, in protest of laws that barred women from voting.

== Seasons ==
List of Flower City 1872 seasons
Season	League	Pld	W	D	L	GF	GA	GD	Pos	Top goalscorer	Ref
2023	United Women's Soccer	6	1	0	5	6	30	–24	14th	Taylor Wingerden (2)	
2024	United Women's Soccer	8	3	1	4	17	15	+2	9th	Chloe DeLyser (5)	
2025	USL W League	10	2	1	7	13	20	-6	5th	Samantha Cipolla (4)	
2026	USL W League	10	4	3	3	20	22	-2	3rd	Eva Poissant (6)	

=== 2023 ===
No.	Name	Games played	Goals	Minutes
2023 Outfield Players
2/7	Madeline Tulloch	5	0	374
3	Winsom Hudson	5	1	275
4	Victoria Sabel	5	0	368
6	Kate Wagner	3	0	270
9	Niyah Rosado	3	0	93
10	Taylor Wingerden	4	2	295
11	Raenah Campbell	4	1	331
12	Taylor Rutland	6	1	527
13	Maya Rutland	6	1	527
14	Kahlee Brown	2	0	166
14	Lindsay Goggins	2	0	112
15	Maria Karipidis	3	0	247
17	Rachel Lee	2	0	156
18	Miah Lathrop	4	0	213
19	Danielle Schnauber	3	0	225
23	Amanda Wisotzke	5	0	450
24	Gabriella Wirth	1	0	83
25	Taylor Ashe	3	0	270
26	Samantha Bishop	3	0	135
29	Sutsadah Khounpachamsy	3	0	124
33	Lauren DiMarzo	1	0	69
Unk	Abby Miller	1	0	90
2023 Goalkeepers
No.	Name	Games played	Goals Against	Minutes
0	Madeline Pizzo	3	21	250
30	Amanda Kessler	4	9	290

May 20 1	Flower City 1872	0–6	FC Buffalo	Rochester, New York
14:30 (EDT)		Report	Carissima Cutrona 20'; Marcella Barberic 40', 52', 53'; Laura Bogner 59'; Morgan Kulniszewski 72'	Stadium: Rochester Community Sports Complex Stadium

May 27 2	Flower City 1872	1–6	BC United	Rochester, New York
14:30 (EDT)	Taylor Rutland 14'	Report	Maya Anand 16', 27', 89'; Olivia McKnight 29', 67'; Victoria McKnight 82'	Stadium: Rochester Community Sports Complex Stadium

June 2 3	FC Buffalo	10–1	Flower City 1872	Williamsville, New York
19:00 (EDT)	Carissima Cutrona 5', 53'; Morgan Kulniszewskil 15'; Marcella Barberic 18', 27', 54', 63'; Payton Robertson 29'; Victoria Colotti 50'; Lianna Van Sice 78'	Report	Raenah Campbell 24'	Stadium: Williamsville South High School Stadium

June 24 4	Flower City 1872	2–1	Erie Commodores FC	Rochester, New York
14:30 (EDT)	Maya Rutland 25'; Winsom Hudson 67'	Report	Rebecka Habursky 68'	Stadium: Rochester Community Sports Complex Stadium

5	Flower City 1872	Cancelled	FC Berlin	Rochester, New York
		Report		Stadium: Rochester Community Sports Complex Stadium

July 2 6	Steel City FC	4–0	Flower City 1872	Cheswick, Pennsylvania
17:30 (EDT)	Mackenzie Dupre 11'; Emily Cooper 14', 22'; Katelyn Killinger 51'	Report		Stadium: Founders Field

July 8 7	Erie Commodores FC	3–2	Flower City 1872	Erie, Pennsylvania
17:00 (EDT)	Kourtney Kessler 34'; Grace Emanuel 38'; Rebecka Habursky 63'	Report	Taylor Wingerden 18', 51	Stadium: Saxon Stadium

8	FC Berlin	Cancelled	Flower City 1872	Buffalo, New York
		Report		Stadium: Coyer Field

=== 2024 ===
No.	Name	Games played	Goals	Minutes	Yellow Cards
2024 Outfield Players
2	Sierra Edwards	3	0	138	0
2/18	Miah Lathrop	2	0	82	0
3/15	Chloe DeLyser	6	0	500	0
4	Jailyn Parrotte	8	0	720	1
5	Grace Murphy	2	0	96	0
6	Anna Costello	5	0	266	0
7/9	Madeline Tulloch	3	0	160	0
7/19	Bre DeHond	4	0	96	0
8	Sabrina Trapani	1	0	73	0
9	Julia Dening	1	0	31	0
10	Taylor Wingerden	3	0	149	0
10/20	Niyah Rosado	8	0	535	1
11/12	Courtney Carter	6	0	540	0
12	Bridget Merkel	5	0	313	0
13	Caitlyn Nelson	4	0	260	0
12/13/19	Sarah O'Donnell	4	0	252	0
14	Corynna Rotoli	8	0	615	0
15	Maria Karipidis	5	0	324	0
16	Maya Ikewood	8	0	658	0
17	Delaney Tellex	3	0	214	0
20/24	Finn Cregan	5	0	301	0
21	Sophia Konstantinou	5	0	347	0
25	Winsom Hudson	4	0	128	1
26	Autumn Edwards	4	0	136	0
31	Emma Herrmann	6	0	236	0
2024 Goalkeepers
No.	Name	Games played	GA	GA	Minutes
0	Sam Haley	8	13	2.00	585
1	Cate Burns	3	2	1.33	135

May 26 1	Flower City 1872	4–3	Erie Commodores FC	Rochester, New York
17:00 (EDT)	Chloe DeLyser 19', 83'; Emma Herrmann 27'; Niyah Rosado 79'	Report	Grace Emanuel 54', 61'; Ellie Mills 66'	Stadium: Rochester Community Sports Complex Stadium; Attendance: 308

June 8 2	Erie Commodores FC	3–4	Flower City 1872	Erie, Pennsylvania
15:00 (EDT)	Paula Pinilla 26'; Brooklyn Respecki'; Grace Emanuel 44'	Report	Chloe DeLyser 60', 89'; Niyah Rosado 81'; Bridget Merkel 90+2'	Stadium: Saxon Stadium; Attendance: 524

June 14 3	Flower City 1872	6–0	FC Berlin	Rochester, New York
19:00 (EDT)	Maria Karipidis 20'; Corynna Rotoli 22'; Delaney Tellex 37', 54', 60'; Niyah Rosado 55'	Report		Stadium: Rochester Community Sports Complex Stadium; Attendance: 257

June 16 4	Steel City FC	2–1	Flower City 1872	Cheswick, Pennsylvania
17:00 (EDT)	Emily Graeca 76' (P); Maddie DeLucio 87'; Jailyn Parrotte (yellow card)	Report	Chloe DeLyser 56'	Stadium: Founders Field; Attendance: 95

June 21 5	FC Berlin	1–0	Flower City 1872	Buffalo, New York
20:00 (EDT)	Lauren Cuisia 84'	Report		Stadium: Coyer Field; Attendance: 67

June 26 6	Flower City 1872	0–2	FC Buffalo	Rochester, New York
19:00 (EDT)		Report	Grace Kulniszewski 65'; Kasia Bak 83'	Stadium: Rochester Community Sports Complex Stadium; Attendance: 206

June 30 7	Flower City 1872	1–1	Steel City FC	Rochester, New York
14:00 (EDT)	Bridget Merkel 74'	Report	Kat McGuire 86'	Stadium: Rochester Community Sports Complex Stadium; Attendance: 294

July 5 8	FC Buffalo	3–1	Flower City 1872	Buffalo, New York
20:00 (EDT)	Gianna Tuzzolino 10'; Dani Martinez 64'; Corynna Rotoli 66' (OG)	Report	Autumn Edwards 49'; Niyah Rosado (yellow card) Winsom Hudson (yellow card)	Stadium: All-High Stadium; Attendance: Unk

=== 2025 ===
May 22 1	FC Buffalo	v	Flower City 1872	Buffalo, New York
19:00 (EDT)				Stadium: All-High Stadium

May 24 2	Flower City 1872	v	Pittsburgh Riveters SC	Rochester, New York
18:00 (EDT)				Stadium: Rochester Community Sports Complex Stadium

May 30 3	Pittsburgh Riveters SC	v	Flower City 1872	Pittsburgh, Pennsylvania
19:00 (EDT)				Stadium: Highmark Stadium

June 1 4	Flower City 1872	v	Erie Sports Center	Rochester, New York
14:00 (EDT)				Stadium: Rochester Community Sports Complex Stadium

June 7 5	Cleveland Force SC	v	Flower City 1872	Cleveland, Ohio
18:30 (EDT)				Stadium: Krenzler Field

June 14 6	Flower City 1872	v	Steel City FC	Rochester, New York
18:00 (EDT)				Stadium: Rochester Community Sports Complex Stadium

June 17 7	Flower City 1872	v	FC Buffalo	Rochester, New York
19:00 (EDT)				Stadium: Rochester Community Sports Complex Stadium

June 21 8	Steel City FC	v	Flower City 1872	Cheswick, Pennsylvania
16:00 (EDT)				Stadium: Founders Field

June 24 9	Flower City 1872	v	Cleveland Force SC	Rochester, New York
19:00 (EDT)				Stadium: Rochester Community Sports Complex Stadium

June 28 10	Erie Sports Center	v	Flower City 1872	Erie, Pennsylvania
14:00 (EDT)				Stadium: Lecom Sports Park

== See also ==
- Sports in Rochester, New York
- Rochester Ravens
