= 2025 United Women's Soccer season =

United Women's Soccer
- Season: 2025
- Champions: Edgewater Castle
- Matches: 96
- Goals: 344 (3.58 per match)
- Biggest home win: Racing Power Fc 7–0 MSI (6/28)
- Biggest away win: Steel United HV 0–8 Olé Eagles (7/6)
- Highest scoring: Steel United HV 0–8 Olé Eagles (7/6)
- Longest winning run: Edgewater Castle (8 wins)
- Longest unbeaten run: Edgewater Castle (8 matches)
- Longest losing run: Indiana United (8 losses)
- All statistics correct as of 23:50, July 21, 2025 (UTC).

The 2025 United Women's Soccer season is the 31st season of pro-am women's soccer in the United States, and the ninth season of the UWS league. For the 2025 season UWS is moving from a 3 conference league to 4 conference league, adding the Great Lakes Conference. In addition UWS announced the reintegration of its second division UWS2.

== Team changes ==
=== New teams ===
- Connecticut Royals
- Crystal Lake Force
- Dekalb County United FC
- FC Pontiac
- Future FC
- Inland Empire FC
- Racing Power FC USA
- SoCal FC
- Tudela FC

=== New UWS2 Teams ===
- Crystal Lake Force
- River Light FC
- Team Chicago

=== Demoted to UWS2 ===
- Chicago Rush
- Firebirds SC
- Rockford Raptors
- Steel City FC

=== Departing Teams ===
- Albany Rush
- Black Mountain Torrent
- Calgary Foothills WFC
- Cincinnati Sirens FC
- Connecticut Rush
- Coppermine United
- Elite 14 SC
- Erie Commodores FC
- FC Arizona
- FC Berlin
- FC Buffalo
- Flower City 1872
- Hudson Valley Crusaders
- Indiana Union
- Michigan Burn
- Michigan Hawks
- Nationals SC
- New Jersey Copa FC
- New York Magic
- Pass FC
- Players SC
- Santa Clarita Blue Heat
- Sporting CT
- Steel United NJ
- Worcester Fuel FC

== Standings ==
=== East Conference ===
Pos	Team	Pld	W	L	T	GF	GA	GD	Pts	Qualification
1	New England Mutiny (Q)	7	7	0	0	23	3	+20	21	Playoffs
2	Racing Power FC (Q)	7	6	1	0	32	3	+29	18	Playoffs
3	Olé Eagles	7	5	2	0	30	4	+26	15	
4	RP Futures	4	4	0	0	6	1	+5	12	
5	Baltimore Blast	8	2	5	1	6	20	−14	7	
6	Baltimore Warriors	6	2	4	0	8	11	−3	6	
7	New Jersey Alliance	5	2	3	0	3	16	−13	6	
8	Maine Footy	6	1	4	1	8	19	−11	4	
9	Worcester Fuel	2	0	1	1	3	6	−3	1	
10	MSI	6	0	5	1	2	22	−20	1	
11	New Jersey Copa FC	1	0	1	0	0	1	−1	0	
12	Steel United HV	3	0	3	0	0	15	−15	0	

Updated to match(es) played on July 6, 2025. Source: UWS standings
Rules for classification: 1) Head-to-head based on total points; 2) Total wins; 3) Goal difference all league games; 4) Goals scored in league games
(Q) Qualified for the phase indicated

=== Great Lakes Conference ===
Pos	Team	Pld	W	L	T	GF	GA	GD	Pts	Qualification
1	Troy City WFC (Q)	8	5	2	1	16	17	−1	16	Playoffs
2	Michigan Jaguars (Q)	7	5	2	0	16	8	+8	15	Playoffs
3	Flint City AFC	8	4	2	2	21	6	+15	14	
4	FC Pontiac	8	4	3	1	19	14	+5	13	
5	Michigan Stars FC	7	2	3	2	11	13	−2	8	
6	Michigan Legends	8	2	6	0	6	17	−11	6	
7	Cap City Athletic	8	2	6	0	9	23	−14	6	

Updated to match(es) played on July 9, 2025. Source: UWS standings
Rules for classification: 1) Head-to-head based on total points; 2) Total wins; 3) Goal difference all league games; 4) Goals scored in league games
(Q) Qualified for the phase indicated

=== Midwest Conference ===
Pos	Team	Pld	W	L	T	GF	GA	GD	Pts	Qualification
1	Edgewater Castle (Q)	8	8	0	0	28	5	+23	24	Playoffs
2	Crystal Lake Force (Q)	8	4	2	2	17	15	+2	14	Playoffs
3	DeKalb County United	8	4	4	0	14	12	+2	12	
4	Rockford Raptors	8	2	4	2	15	16	−1	8	
5	Indiana United	8	0	8	0	5	31	−26	0	

Updated to match(es) played on July 2, 2025. Source: UWS standings
Rules for classification: 1) Head-to-head based on total points; 2) Total wins; 3) Goal difference all league games; 4) Goals scored in league games
(Q) Qualified for the phase indicated

=== West Conference ===
Pos	Team	Pld	W	L	T	GF	GA	GD	Pts	Qualification
1	Los Angeles SC (Q)	6	3	1	2	11	5	+6	11	Playoffs
2	SoCal FC (Q)	6	2	2	2	6	7	−1	8	Playoffs
3	Future FC	6	2	2	2	6	8	−2	8	
4	Tudela FCLA	6	1	3	2	5	8	−3	5	
5	Inland Empire FC	3	0	3	0	1	12	−11	0	

Updated to match(es) played on July 6, 2025. Source: UWS standings
Rules for classification: 1) Head-to-head based on total points; 2) Total wins; 3) Goal difference all league games; 4) Goals scored in league games
(Q) Qualified for the phase indicated

== Playoffs ==
Conference Finals; July12–13
CA	SoCal FC	3(1)
CA	Los Angeles SC	3(0)
West Conference; East Conference
MA	New England Mutiny	2
MD	Racing Power FC	1
MI	Troy City WFC	1
MI	Michigan Jaguars	5
Great Lakes Conference; Midwest Conference
IL	Crystal Lake Force	1
IL	Edgewater Castle	3

National Semifinals; July 19
CA	SoCal FC	1
MA	New England Mutiny	2
MI	Michigan Jaguars	2
IL	Edgewater Castle	4

National Final; July 20
MA	New England Mutiny	0
IL	Edgewater Castle	2

== UWS2 Standings ==
=== UWS2 ===
Pos	Team	Pld	W	L	T	GF	GA	GD	Pts
1	Rockford Raptors FC	8	7	1	0	16	8	+8	21
2	Firebirds SC	8	5	1	2	21	12	+9	17
3	River Light FC	6	4	2	0	19	15	+4	12
4	Chicago Rush	8	2	3	3	15	17	−2	9
5	Team Chicago	7	2	4	1	16	15	+1	7
6	Steel City FC	8	2	5	1	15	18	−3	7
7	Worcester Fuel II	3	2	1	0	9	2	+7	6
8	Western United FC II	3	2	1	0	6	7	−1	6
9	Crystal Lake Force II	7	0	6	1	3	20	−17	1
10	Steel United HV II	2	0	2	0	1	7	−6	0

Updated to match(es) played on July 18, 2025. Source: UWS standings
Rules for classification: 1) Head-to-head based on total points; 2) Total wins; 3) Goal difference all league games; 4) Goals scored in league games
