= 2026 United Women's Soccer Season =

United Women's Soccer
- Season: 2026
- Matches: 129
- Goals: 554 (4.29 per match)
- Biggest home win: FCP 8–1 JA2 (5/31); FCA 7–0 STA (6/3)
- Biggest away win: LOS 0–13 UCF (6/7)
- Highest scoring: RFR 6–10 CIS (6/2)
- Longest winning run: Flint City AFC (7 wins)
- Longest unbeaten run: Michigan Jaguars; Berber City FC (8 matches)
- Longest losing run: Maine Mystics; San Fernando Valley FC (8 losses)
- All statistics correct as of 23:36, July 14, 2026 (UTC).

The 2026 United Women's Soccer season is the 32nd season of pro-am women's soccer in the United States, and the tenth season of the UWS league. For the 2026 season UWS is moving from a 4 conference league to 5 division league.

== Team changes ==
=== New teams ===
- AC Grand Rapids Academy
- Berber City FC
- Chicago Inter Soccer Club
- Club Atletico Internacional
- Connecticut Legends
- Lancaster FC
- Maine Mystics
- Midland Fusion
- Midwest United FC U23
- Pinnacle FC
- San Fernando Valley FC
- Tulip City United
- United City FC II
- Worcester Wanderers FC

=== New UWS2 Teams ===
- Wheaton United SC

=== Departing Teams ===
- Edgewater Castle FC
- Future FC
- Indiana United
- Inland Empire FC
- New Jersey Alliance
- New Jersey Copa FC
- Olé FC
- RP Futures
- Steel United
- Tudela FC
- Worcester Fuel FC

== Standings ==
=== Great Lakes Division ===
Pos	Team	Pld	W	L	T	GF	GA	GD	Pts	Qualification
1	Michigan Jaguars (Q, A)	8	7	0	1	35	6	+29	22	Division Playoffs
2	Flint City AFC	8	7	1	0	29	9	+20	21	
3	Midwest United FC U23 (Q)	8	5	1	2	29	13	+16	17	Division Playoffs
4	Tulip City United (Q)	8	5	3	0	18	21	−3	15	Division Playoffs
5	AC Grand Rapids Academy	8	4	3	1	11	9	+2	13	
6	FC Pontiac	8	4	3	1	20	16	+4	13	
7	Michigan Jaguars II	7	4	3	0	15	16	−1	12	
8	Michigan Stars FC	7	2	2	3	13	18	−5	9	
9	Troy City 2	8	2	4	2	4	12	−8	8	
10	Troy City WFC	8	2	5	1	18	27	−9	7	
11	Pinnacle FC	8	1	6	1	6	23	−17	4	
12	Midland Fusion	8	1	6	1	3	19	−16	4	
13	Lansing City	8	0	7	1	7	25	−18	1	

Updated to match(es) played on July 6, 2025. Source: UWS standings
Rules for classification: 1) Head-to-head based on total points; 2) Total wins; 3) Goal difference all league games; 4) Goals scored in league games
(A) Advance to a further round; (Q) Qualified for the phase indicated

=== Division Playoffs ===
Division Semifinals; July 8			Division Finals; July 18
			MI	Michigan Jaguars	3
			MI	Midwest United U23s	0
MI	Tulip City United	0	MI	Midwest United U23s	0
MI	Midwest United U23s	1

=== Mid-Atlantic Division ===
Pos	Team	Pld	W	L	T	GF	GA	GD	Pts	Qualification
1	Racing Power FC	8	7	1	0	28	6	+22	21	Playoffs
2	Baltimore Blast	8	6	1	1	27	8	+19	19	Playoffs
3	Baltimore Warriors	8	4	3	1	18	15	+3	13	
4	Lancaster FC	8	1	7	0	7	28	−21	3	
5	MSI	8	1	7	0	6	29	−23	3	

Updated to match(es) played on July 23, 2026. Source: UWS standings
Rules for classification: 1) Head-to-head based on total points; 2) Total wins; 3) Goal difference all league games; 4) Goals scored in league games

=== Midwest Division ===
Pos	Team	Pld	W	L	T	GF	GA	GD	Pts	Qualification
1	Berber City FC	8	5	0	3	26	12	+14	18	Playoffs
2	Chicago Inter Soccer Club	8	5	2	1	29	18	+11	16	Playoffs
3	Crystal Lake Force	8	3	2	3	17	12	+5	12	
4	DeKalb County United	8	1	3	4	15	24	−9	7	
5	Rockford Raptors	8	0	7	1	9	30	−21	1	

Updated to match(es) played on July 8, 2026. Source: UWS standings
Rules for classification: 1) Head-to-head based on total points; 2) Total wins; 3) Goal difference all league games; 4) Goals scored in league games

=== Northeast Division ===
Pos	Team	Pld	W	L	T	GF	GA	GD	Pts	Qualification
1	New England Mutiny	7	5	0	2	24	5	+19	17	Playoffs
2	Worcester Wanderers FC	8	5	3	0	23	12	+11	15	Playoffs
3	Connecticut Legends	7	4	2	1	19	7	+12	13	
4	Maine Footy	8	3	4	1	17	12	+5	10	
5	Maine Mystics	8	0	8	0	3	50	−47	0	

Updated to match(es) played on July 11, 2026. Source: UWS standings
Rules for classification: 1) Head-to-head based on total points; 2) Total wins; 3) Goal difference all league games; 4) Goals scored in league games

=== West Division ===
Pos	Team	Pld	W	L	T	GF	GA	GD	Pts	Qualification
1	United City FC II	8	6	1	1	36	6	+30	19	Playoffs
2	SoCal FC	7	6	1	0	23	7	+16	18	Playoffs
3	Club Atletico Internacional	7	3	3	1	12	13	−1	10	
4	Los Angeles SC	8	3	5	0	10	26	−16	9	
5	San Fernando Valley FC	8	0	8	0	4	33	−29	0	

Updated to match(es) played on July 11, 2026. Source: UWS standings
Rules for classification: 1) Head-to-head based on total points; 2) Total wins; 3) Goal difference all league games; 4) Goals scored in league games

== UWS2 Standings ==
United Women's Soccer
- Season: 2026
- Matches: 26
- Goals: 97 (3.73 per match)
- Biggest home win: River Lights FC 6–0 Force FC II (7/7)
- Biggest away win: Rockford Raptors FC II 0–6 River Lights FC (7/11)
- Highest scoring: Ladies Steel City FC 1–6 Wheaton United FC (6/28)
- Longest winning run: Firebirds SC; River Lights FC (4 wins)
- Longest unbeaten run: River Lights FC (7 matches)
- Longest losing run: Force II (7 losses)
- All statistics correct as of 23:13, July 25, 2026 (UTC).

=== UWS2 ===
Pos	Team	Pld	W	L	T	GF	GA	GD	Pts
1	River Light FC	7	6	0	1	24	4	+20	19
2	Team Chicago	7	4	1	2	22	7	+15	14
3	Firebirds SC	8	4	2	2	12	6	+6	14
4	Steel City FC	8	3	3	2	12	15	−3	11
5	Rockford Raptors FC II	8	3	3	2	14	17	−3	11
6	Wheaton United FC	8	1	5	2	7	20	−13	5
7	Force II	8	0	7	1	19	41	−22	1

First match(es) will be played: July 21, 2026. Source: UWS standings
Rules for classification: 1) Head-to-head based on total points; 2) Total wins; 3) Goal difference all league games; 4) Goals scored in league games
