= Ladies Steel City FC =

- Full name: Ladies Steel City Football Club
- Founded: 2016
- Ground: Duly Health and Care Field, Joliet
- Capacity: 6,016
- League: United Women's Soccer
- Website: https://uwssoccer.com/teams/team-details/LSC/steel-city/

Ladies Steel City FC is an American semi-professional soccer club based out of Joliet, Illinois.

== History ==
Ladies Steel City were founded in 2016. In June 2018, it was announced that Ladies Steel City would be joining the United Premier Soccer League ahead of the 2019 season. For the 2020 season, the club moved to the United Women's Soccer league.

== Results ==
=== Year-by-year ===
Season	League	Pos.	Pl.	W	D	L	GF	GA	Pts.	Playoffs
2020	UWS	Cancelled due to the COVID-19 pandemic								
2021	UWS	4th	10	3	0	7	15	27	did not qualify	
2022	UWS	Did not field team								
2023	UWS	7th	8	4	1	3	20	10	13	First Round
2024	UWS	5th	9	5	3	1	24	10	18	did not qualify
2025	UWS2	6th	8	2	1	5	15	18	7	N/A

== Players ==
=== First-team squad ===
As of 2023

Note: Flags indicate national team as defined under FIFA eligibility rules; some limited exceptions apply. Players may hold more than one non-FIFA nationality.

No.	Pos.	Nation	Player
4	DF	USA	Victoria Alvarado
6	FW	USA	Azalea Daffodil
7	MF	ENG	Lisa Milliken
8	MF	USA	Hailey Bartlaga
9	FW	USA	Katherine Knutte
10	DF	USA	Sarah Johnson
14	DF	USA	Haley Ochromowicz
17	FW	USA	Allyson Fischer
18	FW	USA	Jamie Beniac
23	FW	USA	Laura Stepniak
24	DF	USA	Karis Catrinta

No.	Pos.	Nation	Player
26	MF	USA	Elisa Aguilar
28	MF	USA	Sara Loichinger
29	DF	USA	Sara Petrone
37	DF	USA	Marissa Anderson
39	MF	USA	Alexis Abelove
100	GK	USA	Samantha Tuuk
—	GK	USA	Kelsey Deck
—	GK	USA	Darya Mosallaei
—	FW	USA	Haley Samolis
—	FW	USA	Zoe Swift
