= Calgary Foothills =

Calgary Foothills may refer to:

- Calgary-Foothills (electoral district)
- Calgary Foothills FC, a Canadian men's soccer team
- Calgary Foothills WFC, a Canadian women's soccer team
