= 2017 United Women's Soccer season =

United Women's Soccer
- Season: 2017
- Champions: Grand Rapids FC
- Matches: 95
- Goals: 354 (3.73 per match)
- Top goalscorer: Bethany Balcer - GRFC (19 goals)
- Biggest home win: 11-0 (July 15, GRFC, vs. FCI)
- Biggest away win: 0-6 (May 13, NJ vs. Rochester); 1-7 (July 8, Indy vs. GRFC)
- Highest scoring: 11-0 (July 15, GRFC, vs. FCI)
- Longest winning run: 9 (SCBH, May 26-July 21)
- Longest unbeaten run: 12 (GRFC, May 27-July 22)
- Longest losing run: 9 (NYM, May 27-July 14)
- All statistics correct as of July 22, 2017.

The 2017 United Women's Soccer season was the 23nd season of pro-am women's soccer in the United States, and the 2nd season of the UWS league.

== Changes from 2016 ==
- Detroit Sun FC, FC Indiana, Fort Wayne United Soccer Club, Grand Rapids FC, Indy Premier SC, Michigan Legends FC, and Toledo Villa FC joined the league and were placed in the newly formed Midwest Conference.
- Syracuse Developmental Academy, Western New York Flash, and Rochester Lady Lancers joined the league and were placed in the East Conference.
- Calgary Foothills WFC and So Cal Crush FC joined the league and were placed in the West Conference.
- The league championship moved to a four-team format, with one representative from each conference (the West conference champions, the winner of the four-team Midwest playoffs, and the winner of a two-team East playoff) and a fourth wild-card team to be determined by record, strength of schedule, travel concerns, and other factors. These four teams are then seeded and play two semifinal matches, with the winners playing in the finals for the league title.

== Standings ==
=== East Conference ===
Pos	Team	Pld	W	L	T	GF	GA	GD	Pts	Qualification
1	New Jersey Copa FC	10	8	1	1	23	7	+16	25	2017 East Conference playoffs
2	Long Island Rough Riders	10	7	2	1	35	10	+25	22	2017 East Conference playoffs
3	New England Mutiny	10	7	3	0	23	10	+13	21	
4	New York Surf	10	6	2	2	25	12	+13	20	
5	Western New York Flash	10	4	4	2	18	21	−3	14	
6	Lancaster Inferno	10	4	6	0	18	23	−5	12	
7	Rochester Lady Lancers	10	0	9	1	10	35	−25	1	
8	New York Magic	10	0	9	1	4	38	−34	1	

Source: UWS standings
Rules for classification: 1) points; 2) head-to-head (if only 2 teams) 3) wins; 4) goal difference (maximum +5 goal difference in a game); 5) goals scored; 6) total points in smallest group; 7) points earned against top 4 finishers; 8) points outside smallest group; 9) lottery

=== Midwest Conference ===
Pos	Team	Pld	W	L	T	GF	GA	GD	Pts	Qualification
1	Grand Rapids FC	10	8	1	1	32	7	+25	25	2017 Midwest Conference playoffs
2	Detroit Sun FC	10	6	1	3	23	12	+11	21	2017 Midwest Conference playoffs
3	Michigan Legends FC	10	4	3	3	21	16	+5	15	2017 Midwest Conference playoffs
4	FC Indiana	10	4	6	0	13	20	−7	12	2017 Midwest Conference playoffs
5	Toledo Villa FC	10	3	6	1	16	22	−6	10	
6	Fort Wayne United FC Gryphons	10	3	6	1	9	25	−16	10	
7	Indy Premier SC	10	2	7	1	9	21	−12	7	

Source: UWS standings
Rules for classification: 1) points; 2) head-to-head (if only 2 teams) 3) wins; 4) goal difference (maximum +5 goal difference in a game); 5) goals scored; 6) total points in smallest group; 7) points earned against top 4 finishers; 8) points outside smallest group; 9) lottery

=== West Conference ===
Pos	Team	Pld	W	L	T	GF	GA	GD	Pts	Qualification
1	Santa Clarita Blue Heat	8	8	0	0	18	5	+13	24	2017 UWS national playoffs
2	Calgary Foothills WFC	8	4	3	1	14	13	+1	13	
3	Real Salt Lake	8	3	4	1	15	10	+5	10	
4	Houston Aces	8	3	5	0	21	19	+2	9	
5	SoCal Crush	8	1	7	0	7	28	−21	3	

Source: UWS standings
Rules for classification: 1) points; 2) head-to-head (if only 2 teams) 3) wins; 4) goal difference (maximum +5 goal difference in a game); 5) goals scored; 6) total points in smallest group; 7) points earned against top 4 finishers; 8) points outside smallest group; 9) lottery

== Playoffs ==
=== East Conference Playoffs ===
Final; July 18
1	New Jersey Copa FC	1
**2**	**Long Island Rough Riders**	**5**

Bold = winner
* = after extra time, ( ) = penalty shootout score

July 18, 2017
7:00 pm EDT

New Jersey Copa FC	1 – 5	Long Island Rough Riders
Hunsberger 86'	Report; Report	Santoro 39', 51'; Elliott 55'; Marra 69' (pen.); Antonino 72'

St. John Vianney High School
Holmdel Township, New Jersey

=== Midwest Conference Playoffs ===
Hosted by Grandville High School in Grandville, Michigan

Semifinal; July 15
**1**	**Grand Rapids FC**	**11**
4	FC Indiana	0
**2**	**Detroit Sun FC**	**1**
3	Michigan Legends FC	0

Final; July 16
**1**	**Grand Rapids FC**	**1**
2	Detroit Sun FC	0

Bold = winner
* = after extra time, ( ) = penalty shootout score

July 15, 2017
4:30 pm EDT

Detroit Sun FC	1 – 0	Michigan Legends FC
Brough

Grandville High School
Grandville, Michigan
Attendance: 630
July 15, 2017
7:30 pm EDT

Grand Rapids FC	11 – 0	FC Indiana
Carlson 4'; Balcer 14', 26', 43'; Lockwood 18'; Corby 34'; Maher 55'; Sagara 65'; Paul 73', 83' (pen.); Stinson 78'

Grandville High School
Grandville, Michigan
Attendance: 630

July 16, 2017
6:00 pm EDT

Grand Rapids FC	1 – 0	Detroit Sun FC
Kovacs 22'

Grandville High School
Grandville, Michigan
Attendance: 641

=== National Playoffs ===
Hosted by Grandville High School in Grandville, Michigan. Classified to the semifinals are Grand Rapids FC (Midwest Conference champion), Santa Clarita (West Conference champion), Long Island Rough Riders (East Conference champion) and Detroit Sun FC invited by United Women's Soccer as a wildcard.

Semifinal; July 21
**MW**	**Grand Rapids FC**	**2 (3)**
E	Long Island Rough Riders	2 (2)
**W**	**Santa Clarita Blue Heat**	**3**
WC	Detroit Sun FC	0

Final; July 22
**MW**	**Grand Rapids FC**	**3***
W	Santa Clarita Blue Heat	1

Bold = winner
* = after extra time, ( ) = penalty shootout score

==== Semifinals ====
July 21, 2017
4:30 pm EDT

Santa Clarita Blue Heat	3 – 0	Detroit Sun FC
Castellanos 45+'; Lavrusky 63'; Castaneda 68'	Report

Grandville High School
Grandville, Michigan
Attendance: 770
July 21, 2017
7:30 pm EDT

Grand Rapids FC	2 – 2 (a.e.t.)	Long Island Rough Riders
Balcer 16' (pen.); Kovacs 119'	Report; Report; Report	Modena 9'; Venezia 107'
Penalties
Lockwood (penalty scored); Steinlage (penalty scored); Corby (penalty missed); Stinson (penalty scored)	3–2	(penalty scored) Marra; (penalty scored) Vasquez; (penalty missed) Venezia; (penalty missed) Groth; (penalty missed) Dutcher

Grandville High School
Grandville, Michigan
Attendance: 770

==== UWS Championship ====
July 22, 2017
7:30 pm EDT

Grand Rapids FC	3 – 1 (a.e.t.)	Santa Clarita Blue Heat
Corby 15'; Sagara 97'; Balcer 103'	Report	Lavrusky 14'

Grandville High School
Grandville, Michigan
Attendance: 1,074
Referee: Rebecca Pagan

Championship MVP: Michaela Kovacs (Grand Rapids FC)

== Statistical leaders ==
=== Top scorers ===
Rank	Player	Nation	Club	Goals
1	Bethany Balcer	USA	Grand Rapids FC	14
2	Carissima Cutrona	USA	Western New York Flash	11
3	Haley Crawford	USA	Lancaster Inferno	10
3	Kate Howarth	USA	New England Mutiny	10
3	Morgan Santoro	USA	Long Island Rough Riders	10
6	Madison Schupbach	USA	Detroit Sun FC	9
7	Skylar Fleak	USA	Toledo Villa FC	8
7	Erica Murphy	USA	New York Surf	8
9	Joelle Gosselin	CAN	Calgary Foothills WFC	7
9	Kayla Saager	USA	Long Island Rough Riders	7
9	Tori Singstock	USA	Michigan Legends FC	7

== League awards ==
=== Individual awards ===
- Player of the Year: Deyna Castellanos (SAC)
- Defensive Player of the Year: Caitlyn Clem (DET)
- Coach of the Year: Lewis Robinson (GRA)

=== All-League First Team ===
F: Bethany Balcer (GRA), Carissima Cutrona (WNY)
M: Jackie Bruno (NJC), Deyna Castellanos (SAC), Kimberly Marra (LIR), Annie Steinlage (GRA)
D: Michaela Kovacs (GRA), Natalia Kuikka (SAC), Rebecca Raber (NJC), Lauren Sesselmann (SAC)
G: Caitlyn Clem (DET)

=== All-League Second Team ===
F: Haley Crawford (LAN), Joelle Gosselin (CAL), Madison Schupbach (DET)
M: Brenna Brown (NEM), Chloe Castaneda (SAC), Dani Evans (DET)
D: Jennifer Cafferky (NEM), Taylor Groth (LIR), Natalie Norris (RSL), Brooke Salmon (NYS)
G: Emily Burns (CAL)
