= 2021 United Women's Soccer season =

United Women's Soccer
- Season: 2021
- Champions: Santa Clarita Blue Heat
- Matches: 187
- Goals: 753 (4.03 per match)
- Top goalscorer: Kennedy Kessler (LSR); 11 goals
- Biggest home win: MWU 12–0 INE; June 13
- Biggest away win: MUS 0–10 DFC; June 5
- Highest scoring: MWU 12–0 INE; June 13
- Longest winning run: 10 matches Chicago Mustangs; Lone Star Republic (entire season)
- Longest unbeaten run: 10 matches Chicago Mustangs; Lone Star Republic; Midwest United FC (entire season)
- Longest losing run: 10 matches Rochester Lady Lancers; Indiana Elite (entire season)
- All statistics correct as of July 26, 2021.

The 2021 United Women's Soccer season is the 27th season of pro-am women's soccer in the United States, and the fifth season of the UWS league.

== Standings ==
=== Central Conference ===
| Pos | Team | Pld | W | L | T | GF | GA | GD | Pts | Qualification |
|---|---|---|---|---|---|---|---|---|---|---|
| 1 | St. Louis Scott Gallagher | 8 | 5 | 1 | 2 | 14 | 6 | +8 | 17 | 2021 Midwest-Central Conference Playoffs |
| 2 | Gretna Elite Academy | 8 | 4 | 2 | 2 | 24 | 10 | +14 | 14 | |
| 3 | KC Courage | 8 | 4 | 3 | 1 | 12 | 8 | +4 | 13 | |
| 4 | FC Wichita | 8 | 4 | 3 | 1 | 12 | 12 | 0 | 13 | |
| 5 | Springfield Demize | 8 | 0 | 8 | 0 | 4 | 30 | −26 | 0 | |

Source: UWS standings
Rules for classification: 1) Head-to-head based on total points; 2) Total wins; 3) Goal difference all league games; 4) Goals scored in league games

=== East Conference ===
| Pos | Team | Pld | W | L | T | GF | GA | GD | Pts | Qualification |
|---|---|---|---|---|---|---|---|---|---|---|
| 1 | FC Buffalo | 10 | 7 | 2 | 1 | 23 | 14 | +9 | 22 | 2021 East Conference Playoffs |
| 2 | Syracuse Development Academy | 10 | 6 | 2 | 2 | 28 | 5 | +23 | 20 | 2021 East Conference Playoffs |
| 3 | Connecticut Fusion | 10 | 5 | 2 | 3 | 39 | 12 | +27 | 18 | 2021 East Conference Playoffs |
| 4 | Scorpions SC (Note: Scorpions SC were unable to participate in the playoffs so the 5th place team replaced them.) | 10 | 5 | 2 | 3 | 26 | 17 | +9 | 18 | |
| 5 | Lancaster Inferno FC | 10 | 4 | 2 | 4 | 17 | 10 | +7 | 16 | 2021 East Conference Playoffs |
| 6 | New Jersey Copa FC | 10 | 4 | 2 | 4 | 19 | 12 | +7 | 16 | |
| 7 | Connecticut Rush | 10 | 5 | 4 | 1 | 19 | 22 | −3 | 16 | |
| 8 | New England Mutiny | 10 | 3 | 3 | 4 | 24 | 18 | +6 | 13 | |
| 9 | Albany Rush | 10 | 4 | 5 | 1 | 22 | 23 | −1 | 13 | |
| 10 | Long Island Rough Riders | 10 | 3 | 3 | 4 | 10 | 12 | −2 | 13 | |
| 11 | Brooklyn City FC | 10 | 3 | 4 | 3 | 16 | 15 | +1 | 12 | |
| 12 | Worcester Smiles | 10 | 1 | 9 | 0 | 5 | 59 | −54 | 3 | |
| 13 | Rochester Lady Lancers | 10 | 0 | 10 | 0 | 5 | 34 | −29 | 0 | |

Source: UWS standings
Rules for classification: 1) Head-to-head based on total points; 2) Total wins; 3) Goal difference all league games; 4) Goals scored in league games

=== Midwest North Conference ===
| Pos | Team | Pld | W | L | T | GF | GA | GD | Pts | Qualification |
|---|---|---|---|---|---|---|---|---|---|---|
| 1 | Midwest United FC | 10 | 9 | 0 | 1 | 42 | 14 | +28 | 28 | 2021 Midwest-Central Conference Playoffs |
| 2 | Corktown AFC | 10 | 7 | 3 | 0 | 31 | 14 | +17 | 21 | 2021 Midwest-Central Conference Playoffs |
| 3 | Detroit City FC | 10 | 6 | 4 | 0 | 32 | 12 | +20 | 18 | |
| 4 | Lansing United | 10 | 3 | 6 | 1 | 20 | 25 | −5 | 10 | |
| 5 | Muskegon Risers SC | 10 | 1 | 8 | 1 | 11 | 45 | −34 | 4 | |

Source: UWS standings
Rules for classification: 1) Head-to-head based on total points; 2) Total wins; 3) Goal difference all league games; 4) Goals scored in league games

=== Midwest South Conference ===
| Pos | Team | Pld | W | L | T | GF | GA | GD | Pts | Qualification |
|---|---|---|---|---|---|---|---|---|---|---|
| 1 | Chicago Mustangs | 10 | 10 | 0 | 0 | 39 | 3 | +36 | 30 | 2021 Midwest-Central Conference Playoffs |
| 2 | Chicago KICS | 10 | 5 | 5 | 0 | 16 | 18 | −2 | 15 | |
| 3 | MSC Peoria | 10 | 4 | 5 | 1 | 16 | 22 | −6 | 13 | |
| 4 | Steel City FC | 10 | 3 | 7 | 0 | 15 | 27 | −12 | 9 | |
| 5 | Indiana Elite | 10 | 0 | 10 | 0 | 2 | 44 | −42 | 0 | |

Source: UWS standings
Rules for classification: 1) Head-to-head based on total points; 2) Total wins; 3) Goal difference all league games; 4) Goals scored in league games

=== Southeast Conference ===
| Pos | Team | Pld | W | L | T | GF | GA | GD | Pts |
|---|---|---|---|---|---|---|---|---|---|
| 1 | Pensacola FC (Note: The Southeast Conference held a championship game on July 10, which Pensacola FC won 2−0 over Atlanta Panthers SC. The champion did not participate in the national tournament.) (C) | 5 | 5 | 0 | 0 | 21 | 1 | +20 | 15 |
| 2 | Atlanta Panthers SC | 6 | 3 | 2 | 1 | 17 | 13 | +4 | 10 |
| 3 | Pensacola Academy | 5 | 1 | 4 | 0 | 7 | 20 | −13 | 3 |
| 4 | Louisiana FC | 6 | 1 | 4 | 1 | 8 | 19 | −11 | 4 |

Source: UWS standings
Rules for classification: 1) Head-to-head based on total points; 2) Total wins; 3) Goal difference all league games; 4) Goals scored in league games
(C) Champions

=== Southwest Conference ===
| Pos | Team | Pld | W | L | T | GF | GA | GD | Pts | Qualification |
|---|---|---|---|---|---|---|---|---|---|---|
| 1 | Lone Star Republic | 10 | 10 | 0 | 0 | 41 | 5 | +36 | 30 | 2021 Southwest Conference Playoffs |
| 2 | San Antonio Athenians SC | 10 | 9 | 1 | 0 | 31 | 11 | +20 | 27 | 2021 Southwest Conference Playoffs |
| 3 | Side FC 92 | 10 | 5 | 4 | 1 | 29 | 15 | +14 | 16 | 2021 Southwest Conference Playoffs |
| 4 | Williamson County FC (Note: Williamson County FC were unable to participate in the playoffs so the 5th place team replaced them.) | 10 | 5 | 5 | 0 | 22 | 22 | 0 | 15 | |
| 5 | FC Austin Elite | 10 | 4 | 5 | 1 | 17 | 15 | +2 | 13 | 2021 Southwest Conference Playoffs |
| 6 | Bat Country FC | 10 | 2 | 7 | 1 | 11 | 32 | −21 | 7 | |
| 7 | Alacranes Fort Worth | 10 | 2 | 7 | 1 | 14 | 29 | −15 | 7 | |
| 8 | CTX Hornets | 10 | 1 | 9 | 0 | 3 | 39 | −36 | 3 | |

Source: UWS standings
Rules for classification: 1) Head-to-head based on total points; 2) Total wins; 3) Goal difference all league games; 4) Goals scored in league games

=== West Conference ===
| Pos | Team | Pld | W | L | T | GF | GA | GD | Pts | Qualification |
|---|---|---|---|---|---|---|---|---|---|---|
| 1 | Santa Clarita Blue Heat (C) | 6 | 4 | 0 | 2 | 16 | 4 | +12 | 14 | 2021 UWS National Playoffs |
| 2 | Calgary Foothills WFC | 4 | 2 | 1 | 1 | 12 | 3 | +9 | 7 | |
| 3 | SASA Impact FC | 4 | 2 | 2 | 0 | 7 | 7 | 0 | 6 | |
| 4 | Kongo SC | 6 | 1 | 4 | 1 | 4 | 21 | −17 | 4 | |
| 5 | Internacional CA | 4 | 0 | 2 | 2 | 3 | 7 | −4 | 2 | |

Source: UWS standings
Rules for classification: 1) Head-to-head based on total points; 2) Total wins; 3) Goal difference all league games; 4) Goals scored in league games
(C) Champions

== Playoffs ==
Conference Semifinals
MN1 | Midwest United FC | 3(6)
MN2 | Corktown AFC | 3(5)
MS1 | Chicago Mustangs | 0
C1 | St. Louis Scott Gallagher | 2
E1 | FC Buffalo | 3
E4 | Lancaster Inferno FC | 2
E2 | Syracuse Development Academy | 0
E3 | Connecticut Fusion | 2
S1 | Lone Star Republic | 2
S4 | FC Austin Elite | 1
S2 | San Antonio Athenians SC | 2
S3 | Side FC 92 | 1

Conference Finals
MN1 | Midwest United FC | 3
C1 | St. Louis Scott Gallagher | 1
E1 | FC Buffalo | 0
E3 | Connecticut Fusion | 2
S1 | Lone Star Republic | 0
S2 | San Antonio Athenians SC | 1

National Semifinals
MN1 | Midwest United FC | 1
E3 | Connecticut Fusion | 2
S2 | San Antonio Athenians SC | 0
W1 | Santa Clarita Blue Heat | 4

National Final
E3 | Connecticut Fusion | 0
W1 | Santa Clarita Blue Heat | 5
