= 2016 United Women's Soccer season =

United Women's Soccer
- Season: 2016
- Champions: Santa Clarita Blue Heat
- Matches played: 50
- Goals scored: 185 (3.7 per match)
- Top goalscorer: Krystyna Freda (NJC) (15)
- Biggest home win: RSL 5-0 COP (July 7); LAN 6-1 TSF (July 9)
- Biggest away win: HOU 1-10 SAC (May 21)
- Highest scoring: HOU 1-10 SAC (May 21)
- Longest winning run: 7 games New Jersey Copa FC (May 29 – July 16)
- Longest unbeaten run: 9 games New Jersey Copa FC (May 21 – July 16)
- Longest losing run: 6 games New York Magic (June 18 – July 17)
- All statistics correct as of July 30, 2016.

The 2016 United Women's Soccer season is the 22nd season of pro-am women's soccer in the United States, and the 1st season of the new UWS league. The regular season began on May 14 and ended on July 23.

The league was announced with eight teams in the northeastern United States and eastern Canada in December after the USL W-League had folded a few months previously. Five teams in a western division were added in January before the Canadian Soccer Association refused entry of two Quebec clubs into UWS, leaving the league at 11 teams for its inaugural season.

== Teams, stadiums, and personnel ==
=== Stadiums and locations ===
Locations of announced teams for the 2016 United Women's Soccer season

=== Personnel and sponsorship ===
Team	Head coach	Kit producer	Shirt sponsor
Colorado Pride	(Hungary) Richard Simonyi	Adidas	
Colorado Storm	(Trinidad and Tobago) Brian Haynes	Nike	
Houston Aces	(Brazil) Aguinaldo Ferreira	Under Armour	
Lancaster Inferno	(Honduras) Francisco Cleaves	Under Armour	Lancaster Regional Medical Center
Long Island Rough Riders	(United States) Steve Cadet	Adidas	Rechler Equity Partners, LLC
New England Mutiny	(United States) Joe Abele	Macron	AAA Insurance
New Jersey Copa FC	(Ecuador) Roberto Aguas	Adidas	Jersey Mike's Subs
New York Magic	(Italy) Nino DePasquali	Legea	
Real Salt Lake Women	(United States) Mark Davis	Adidas	DOMO
Santa Clarita Blue Heat	(Brazil) Guilherme Mitrovitch	Nike	Uni-Sport
TSF Academy Valkyries	(United States) Mark White	Adidas	

== Competition format ==
- Each team will play each conference opponent once at home and once away.
- The championship match will be played between the winners of each conference.

=== East Conference ===
Pos	Team	Pld	W	D	L	GF	GA	GD	Pts	Qualification
1	New Jersey Copa FC	10	8	1	1	31	11	+20	25	Championship match
2	New England Mutiny	10	6	0	4	21	16	+5	18	
3	Long Island Rough Riders	10	4	3	3	16	10	+6	15	
4	Lancaster Inferno	10	4	1	5	16	15	+1	13	
5	TSF Academy Valkyries	10	3	3	4	14	23	−9	12	
6	New York Magic	10	0	2	8	11	34	−23	2	

Source: UWS East

=== West Conference ===
Pos	Team	Pld	W	D	L	GF	GA	GD	Pts	Qualification
1	Santa Clarita Blue Heat	8	4	3	1	28	13	+15	15	Championship match
2	Real Salt Lake Women	8	4	2	2	17	9	+8	14	
3	Houston Aces	8	4	1	3	13	21	−8	13	
4	Colorado Pride	8	2	2	4	11	18	−7	8	
5	Colorado Storm	8	1	2	5	7	15	−8	5	

Source: UWS West

== UWS Championship ==
July 30, 2016
5:00 pm PDT

Santa Clarita Blue Heat	2–1 (a.e.t.)	New Jersey Copa FC
Hernandez 9', 119'	Report	Nunez 73' (pen.)

The Master's College
Santa Clarita, California

Championship MVP: Julia Hernandez (Santa Clarita Blue Heat)

== Statistical leaders ==
=== Top scorers ===
Rank	Player	Nation	Club	Goals
1	Krystyna Freda	(Cyprus) CYP	New Jersey Copa FC	15
2	Kate Howarth	USA	New England Mutiny	9
3	Christina Bellero	USA	Long Island Rough Riders	6
3	Jeanine Nunez	USA	New Jersey Copa FC	6
5	Shani Abrahams	USA	New York Magic	5
5	Julia Hernandez	USA	Santa Clarita Blue Heat	5
5	Kodi Lavrusky	USA	Santa Clarita Blue Heat	5
5	Kasandra Massey	USA	Santa Clarita Blue Heat	5
9	Teresa Rynier	USA	Lancaster Inferno	4
9	Stefanie Scholz	USA	TSF Academy Valkyries	4

== League awards ==
=== Individual awards ===
- Player of the Year: Krystyna Freda (NJC)
- Defensive Player of the Year: Rebecca Ritchie (RSL)
- Coach of the Year: Roberto Aguas & J.R. Balzarini (NJC)

=== All-League Team ===
F: Krystyna Freda (NJC), Kate Howarth (NEM), Kasandra Massey (SAC)
M: Tatiana Ariza (HOU), Jackie Bruno (NJC), Chloe Castaneda (SAC)
D: Carol Sanchez (LAN), Natalie Norris (RSL), Kelly Eagan (LIR), Yadira Toraya (SAC)
G: Rebecca Ritchie (RSL)
