= Memorial Stadium (Maine) =

Outdoor stadium in Portland, Maine

Coordinates: 43°40′24″N 70°18′00″W

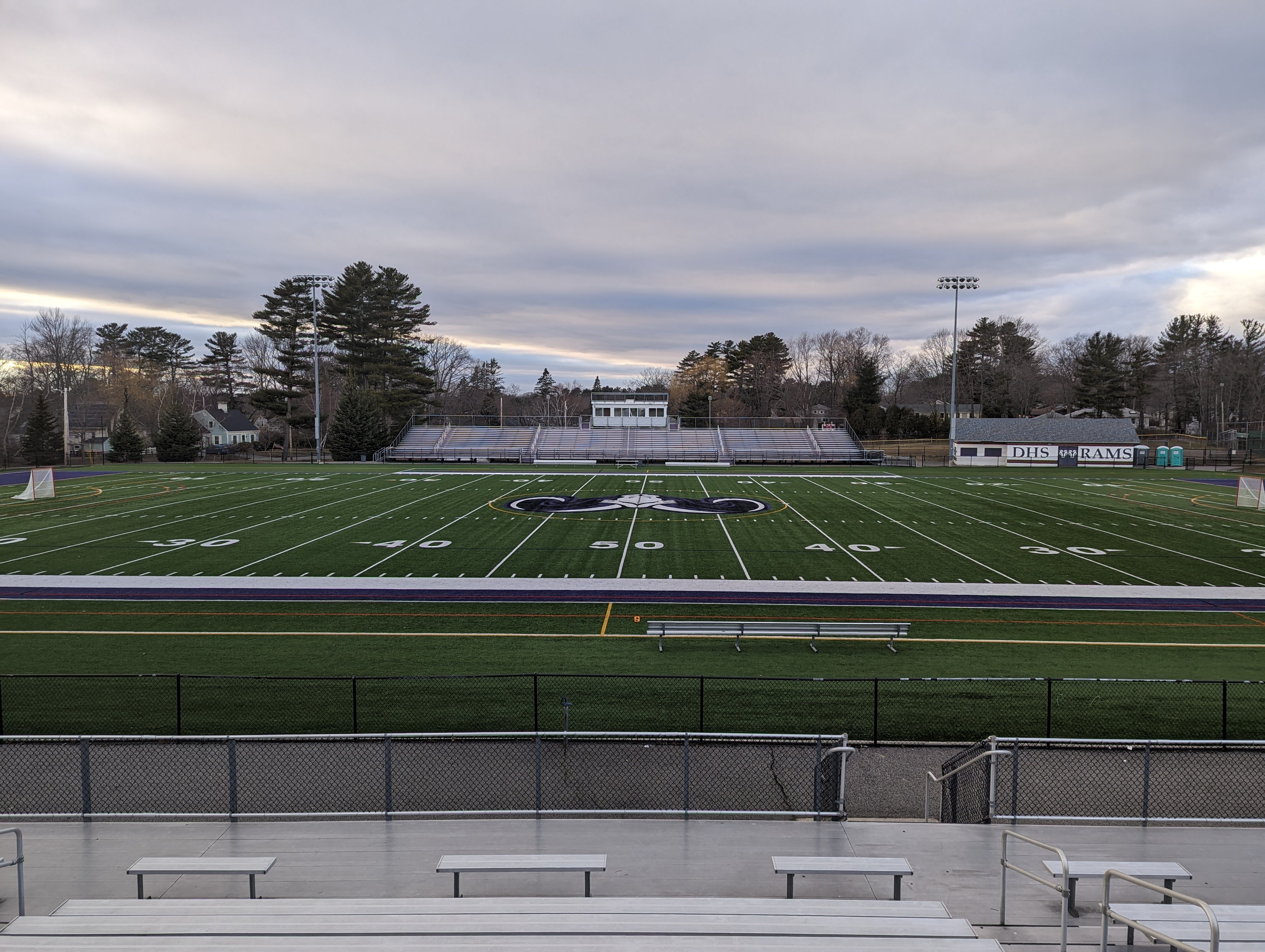
- Memorial Stadium, looking northwest
- Interactive map of Memorial Stadium
- Location: 370 Stevens Ave, Portland, ME, 04103
- Owner: City of Portland
- Capacity: 5,200
- Surface: FieldTurf

Tenants
- Deering High School; GPS Portland Phoenix (USL2) (2010–2019); Maine Footy (2023–present); Southern Maine Raging Bulls

Memorial Stadium is a 5,200-seat multi-purpose outdoor stadium in Portland, Maine. It is located behind Deering High School in the suburban Deering Center neighborhood. It is bounded by Mabel Street to the north, Leland Street to the east, Ludlow Street to the south and Fuller Street to the west.

In addition to hosting Deering High School sports, since 2023 it is the home stadium for Maine Footy, a pro-am team that plays in the East Conference of United Women's Soccer, as well as the former home stadium of the GPS Portland Phoenix, a former amateur team that played in USL League Two that went defunct in 2019. It is also the former home field of the Southern Maine Raging Bulls, who played in the semi-professional New England Football League and who have been inactive since 2021.
