= Christiane Lessa =

Brazilian footballer and manager (born 1982)

Personal information
- Full name: Christiane de Araújo Lessa
- Date of birth: 6 September 1982 (age 44)
- Place of birth: Brasília, Brazil
- Height: 5 ft 7 in (1.70 m)
- Position: Midfielder

Youth career
- 1998: Vasco da Gama
- 1999: Fluminense

College career
Years	Team	Apps	(Gls)
2002–2003	Union Lady Bulldogs		
2004–2005	St. Thomas Bobcats		

Senior career*
Years	Team	Apps	(Gls)
1999	Team Chicago Brasil		
2005–2006	Haukar	18	(2)
2006	Fylkir	4	(0)
2007	Plantation FC		
2007–2010	Miami Kickers		

Managerial career
- 2009–2011: Florida Memorial Lions
- 2012–2015: Iowa Central Community College
- 2016–2017: Young Harris Mountain Lions
- 2017: Washington Spirit Academy
- 2018: Avaldsnes
- 2018: Shandong Luneng U19
- 2019: Sky Blue (assistant)
- 2019: Atlanta SC (assistant)
- 2020: Foz Cataratas
- 2021: Santos
- 2022: FC Austin Elite
- 2022–2023: Pflugerville FC
- 2022: Prairie View A&M
- * Club domestic league appearances and goals

Christiane de Araújo Lessa (born 6 September 1982) is a Brazilian football manager and former player who played as a midfielder. She was the head coach of American college soccer team Prairie View A&M.

== Career ==
Born in Brasília but raised in Niterói, Rio de Janeiro, Lessa represented Vasco da Gama and Fluminense's youth setup before playing for Team Chicago Brasil. She subsequently turned down a call up from the under-17 national team in order to move to the United States and play college football.

In 2002, Lessa was in the roster of Union College's Lady Bulldogs which qualified for the NAIA Women's Soccer Championship for the first time ever. She subsequently played for St. Thomas University's STU Bobcats before moving to Iceland with Haukar in 2005.

On 28 June 2006, Lessa joined Fylkir still in Iceland. She returned to the US in 2007 with Plantation FC, being later a part of Miami Kickers' squad before leaving in 2010.

Back in 2008, Lessa helped in the creation of the women's team of Florida Memorial University's Florida Memorial Lions, being their manager until 2011. In 2012, she was named head coach of the Iowa Central Community College's women's soccer programme.

On 21 January 2016, Lessa was appointed the head coach of Young Harris College's Young Harris Mountain Lions. On 20 October of the following year she took over Washington Spirit's Academy, before moving back to Iceland as the coach of Avaldsnes.

In 2019, after a short period as a head coach of Shandong Luneng's youth sides, Lessa joined Denise Reddy's staff at Sky Blue. She later became the first woman on a men's team's squad in the United States, after being named Roberto Neves' assistant at Atlanta SC.

In 2020, Lessa returned to Brazil to take over Foz Cataratas, but left the club amidst the COVID-19 pandemic. On 25 January 2021, she was named in charge of Santos.

On 9 June 2021, Lessa resigned from Santos despite having seven wins in 13 matches.

In July 2022, Lessa and five other women developed the idea for a women's soccer club based on cultivating a positive experience for their players, staff, fans, and partners, founding Austin Rise FC. Austin Rise FC started play in the Women's Premier Soccer League in 2023.
