= FC Austin Elite =

- Nickname: The Elite
- Founded: 2015
- Dissolved: 2022
- Stadium: Round Rock Multipurpose Complex; Round Rock, Texas
- Chairman: Danny Woodfill
- League: United Women's Soccer

FC Austin Elite was an American women's soccer team, founded in 2015. The team folded in 2022 after United Women's Soccer placed sanctions on the team based on allegations of misconduct.

== History ==
After their founding in 2015, FC Austin Elite played in the Women's Premier Soccer League in 2016 & 2017. The team became a member of the United Women's Soccer in 2018.

=== Workplace misconduct allegations ===
Christiane Lessa was hired as the FC Austin Elite head coach by Danny Woodfill in April 2022, and led the team to a 1st place ranking in the Southwest Conference and 5th place ranking nationally. On July 29, 2022, it was announced that Danny Woodfill had fired Coach Lessa for "failure to meet objectives, failure to build a program, and creating a negative environment”. On June 30, 2022 FC Austin Elite players posted a statement on social media condoning the firing of Coach Lessa and the workplace misconduct of Danny Woodfill. On July 1, 2022 the players filed an official complaint with United Women's Soccer. On July 11, 2022, United Women's Soccer announced sanctions against Danny Woodfill. Because of the sanctions FC Austin Elite were unable to participate in the 2022 play-offs.

== Year-by-year ==
Year	Division	League	Reg. season	Playoffs
2016	2	WPSL	4th, Southwest	DNQ
2017	2	WPSL	7th, Southwest	DNQ
2018	4	UWS	3rd, Southwest	DNQ
2019	4	UWS	2nd, Southwest	DNQ
2020	4	UWS	COVID-19	
2021	4	UWS	5th, Southwest	Conference Semi-Finals
2022	4	UWS	1st, Southwest	Removed
