= Michigan Hawks =

- Full name: Michigan Hawks
- Nickname: The Hawks
- Founded: 2004
- Stadium: Livonia-Stevenson HS Stadium
- Capacity: ????
- Chairman: (United States) Brian Doyle
- Manager: (United States) Dave Hicklin
- League: USL W-League
- 2008: 5th, Midwest Division
Home colours	Away colours

Michigan Hawks was an American women's soccer team that joined the United Soccer Leagues W-League in 2004 as the Detroit Jaguars and renamed to the Michigan Hawks as growth from the larger Michigan Wolves/Hawks organization. The Hawks played in the Midwest Division of the Central Conference. The senior team folded after the 2008 season, though the Hawks youth teams continue to compete in the Elite Clubs National League.

The team played their home games at the stadium on the campus of Livonia-Stevenson High School in the city of Livonia, Michigan. The club's colors was white and black.

== Squad 2008 ==
Note: Flags indicate national team as defined under FIFA eligibility rules; some limited exceptions apply. Players may hold more than one non-FIFA nationality.

No.	Pos.	Nation	Player
0	GK	USA	Elizabeth Watza
1	GK	USA	Shaylin Mannino
2	DF	USA	Akli Delvecchio
4	DF	USA	Megan Pines
5	MF	USA	Danielle Underwood
6	DF	USA	Sarah Stanczyk
7	MF	USA	Courtney Kassab
9	MF	USA	Holli Finneren
12	MF	USA	Jessica Boyle
13	DF	USA	Jackie Carron
15	MF	USA	Lynette Zickl

No.	Pos.	Nation	Player
17	FW	USA	Stephanie Crawford
18	DF	USA	Sarah Burns
19	FW	USA	Melissa Dobbyn
22	MF	USA	Lauren Hill
24	DF	USA	Lauren Sinacola
26	FW	USA	Stephanie Martin
27	MF	USA	Jordan Mueller
28	DF	USA	Torrie Klier
29	GK	USA	Madison Gates
30	DF	USA	Krystin Miller
32	FW	USA	Danielle Toney

== Year-by-year ==
Year	Division	League	Reg. season	Playoffs
Detroit Jaguars
2004	1	USL W-League	3rd, Midwest	did not qualify
2005	1	USL W-League	1st, Midwest	Conference Semifinals
Michigan Hawks
2006	1	USL W-League	1st, Midwest	Conference Semifinals
2007	1	USL W-League	2nd, Midwest	Conference Semifinals
2009-2022	Youth Program Only			
2023	4	United Women's Soccer	4th, Great Lakes	did not qualify
2024	4	United Women's Soccer	6th, Great Lakes	did not qualify

== Honors ==
- USL W-League Midwest Division Champions 2005, 2006

== Notable former players ==
- (Canada) Melissa Tancredi
