= Steel City FC (Pennsylvania) =

Steel City
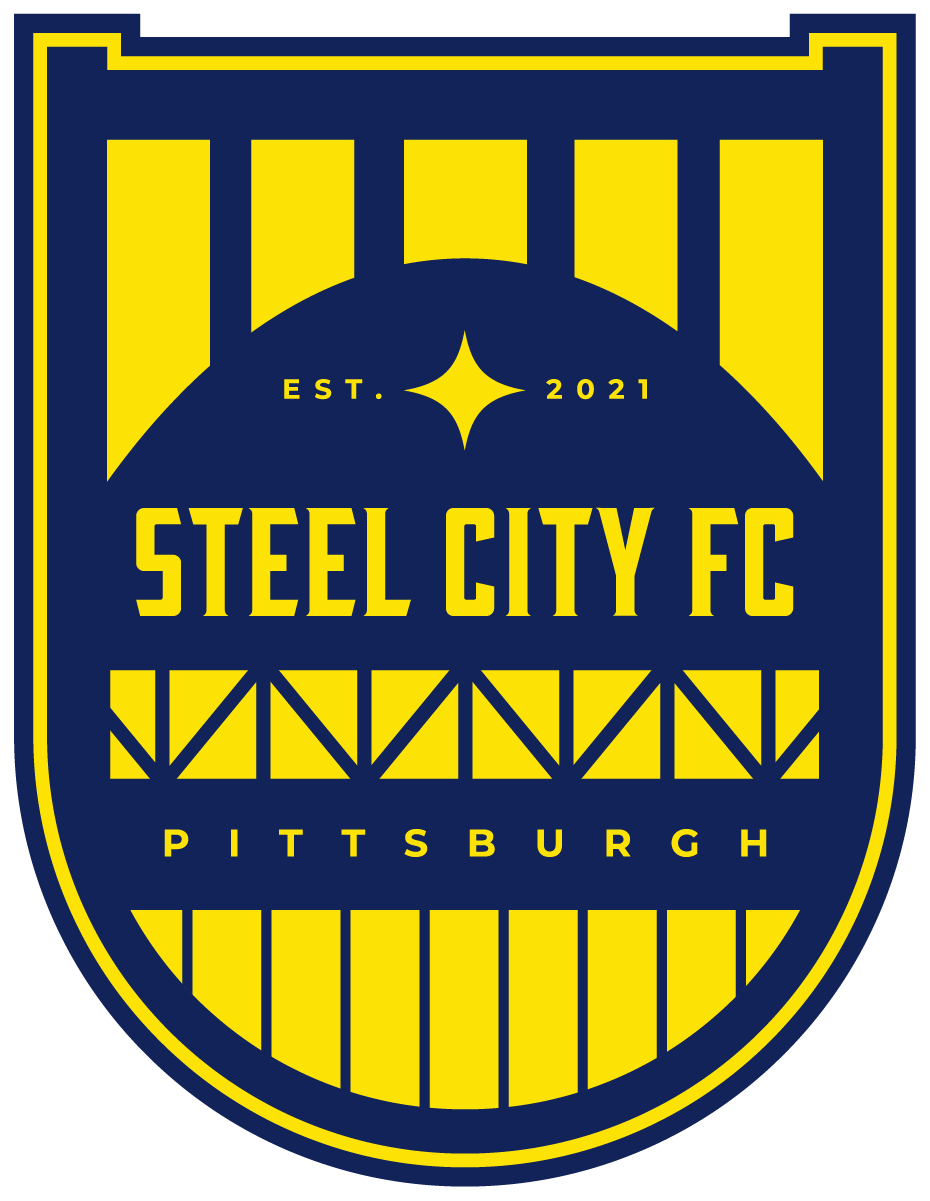
- Full name: Steel City Football Club
- Founded: 2019; 7 years ago as "Pittsburgh Hotspurs"
- Ground: Founders Field, Cheswick, Pennsylvania
- Capacity: 1,500
- Head coach: Jonathan Velotta (Men); Tom Ovenden (Women)
- League: USL League Two; USL W League
- 2025: 1st, Great Forest Division; 4th, Great Forest Division
- Website: steelcityfc.com
Home colours

Steel City FC is an American pre-professional soccer club based out of Pittsburgh. The club has two senior teams, with the men's team playing in the USL League Two and the women's team playing in the USL W League, along with several youth teams.

== Men's team history ==
Formed in the 1976 as a youth soccer team, the Pittsburgh Hotspurs launched its Men's First Team in 2019 to compete in the National Premier Soccer League. According to the team's first coach Tom Campbell, NPSL officials contacted the Hotspurs about joining the league after the Fort Pitt Regiment folded after the 2018 season. Ahead of the cancelled 2020 season, the Hotspurs partnered with the women's team Steel City FC. The team won their first trophy in 2020, winning the NPSL Members Cup over Cleveland SC, FC Buffalo, and Erie Commodores FC.

In 2021, the Hotspurs merged with another youth soccer club, Arsenal FC of Pittsburgh. Prior to the start of the 2023 season, the entire Pittsburgh Hotspurs organization rebranded as Steel City FC, adopting the former name of the women's team.

Steel City FC made their U.S. Open Cup debut in 2024, losing to NISA club Michigan Stars FC in the first round by a score of 1-0.

In December 2024, Steel City announced it would join USL League Two for the 2025 season, being placed in the newly-formed Great Forest Division within the Central Conference. In their first season in USL League Two, Steel City FC won the Great Forest Division title to clinch a playoff spot, though they lost to the Flint City Bucks in the conference quarterfinals, 4-3.

Following the 2025 season, Steel City qualified for the 2026 U.S. Open Cup, their second appearance in the tournament. Steel City FC faced defending USLC champion Pittsburgh Riverhounds SC in the first round, the first match between two Pittsburgh-area clubs since the Harmarville Hurricanes defeated Morgan Strasser in the national quarterfinals of the 1957 National Challenge Cup. Steel City FC won its second consecutive Great Forest Division title, and fourth-straight overall, with an unbeaten 9-3-0 record. The club won its first USL2 playoff game over Northern Indiana FC, before falling to the Flint City Bucks for the second season. Head coach Dan Brower would step down to spend more time with his family, with Jonathan Velotta named as his replacement.

=== Seasons ===
As of November 1, 2026

Season	League											Position		Playoffs	USOC
Season	League	Conf	Pld	W	L	D	GF	GA	GD	Pts	PPG	Conf.	Overall	Playoffs	USOC
Pittsburgh Hotspurs
2019	NPSL	East	10	1	7	2	10	25	-15	5	0.50	6th	84th	DNQ	DNQ
2020	NPSL	Rust Belt	Season cancelled due to COVID-19												
2021	NPSL	Rust Belt	10	8	2	0	19	14	+5	24	2.40	2nd	10th	RQF	DNQ
2022	NPSL	Rust Belt	12	8	4	0	24	15	+9	24	2.00	2nd	26th	RQF	DNQ
Steel City FC
2023	NPSL	Great Lakes	12	10	0	2	32	12	+20	32	2.67	1st	5th	RF	DNQ
2024	NPSL	Great Lakes	10	7	0	3	36	8	+28	24	2.40	1st	9th	RF	R1
2025	USL2	Great Forest	12	8	1	3	26	12	+14	27	2.25	1st	15th	CQF	DNQ
2026	USL2	Great Forest	12	9	0	3	20	3	+17	30	2.50	1st		CSF	R1
2027															3rd Qualifying Round
Total	–	–	78	51	14	13	167	89	+78	168	2.15	-	-	-	

=== U.S. Open Cup matches ===
March 21, 2024 First round	Steel City FC	0-1	Michigan Stars FC	Pittsburgh, Pennsylvania
7:00 PM EDT		Report	Lellouch 83'	Stadium: Ambrose Urbanic Field; Attendance: 1,142; Referee: Alex Parent

March 25, 2026 First Round	Steel City FC	1-2	(Pennsylvania) Pittsburgh Riverhounds SC	Pittsburgh, Pennsylvania
7:00 PM ET	Graeca 76' (pen.)	Report	Griffin 6'; Ahl 66'	Stadium: Highmark Stadium; Attendance: 4,287; Referee: Samuel Reynolds

== Women's team history ==
The club's women's team was founded as a separate organization, competing in the Women's Premier Soccer League through the 2019 season. Ahead of the 2020 season, Steel City FC merged with the Pittsburgh Hotspurs. The team joined United Women's Soccer for the 2021 season. Following the 2020 merger with the Pittsburgh Hotspurs, the team continued to use the moniker Steel City FC until 2022, when the team competed under the Hotspurs brand for a single season before the entire organization rebranded as Steel City FC.

In December 2024, the women's team joined the men's team in moving to the USL and joined the USL W League for 2025, with the team placed in the newly-formed Great Forest Division within the Central Conference.

=== Seasons ===
As of July 4, 2025

Season	League											Position		Playoffs
Season	League	Conf	Pld	W	L	D	GF	GA	GD	Pts	PPG	Conf.	Overall	Playoffs
Steel City FC
2015	WPSL	Can Am	7	5	1	1	25	4	+21	16	2.29	2nd	12th	DNQ
2016	WPSL	Great Lakes	10	1	9	0	15	25	-10	3	0.30	6th	93rd	DNQ
2017	WPSL	Great Lakes	8	4	4	0	16	26	-10	12	1.50	3rd	49th	DNQ
2018	WPSL	Ohio Valley	8	2	5	1	13	22	-9	7	0.86	6th	75th	DNQ
2019	WPSL	Keystone	8	4	3	1	13	13	0	13	0.86	3rd	50th	DNQ
2020	WPSL	Ohio Valley	Season cancelled due to COVID-19											
2021	UWS	Midwest South	10	3	7	0	15	27	-12	9	0.90	4th	33rd	DNQ
Pittsburgh Hotspurs
2022	UWS	Penn-NY	10	0	8	2	13	30	-17	2	0.20	5th	44th	DNQ
Steel City FC
2023	UWS	East	8	4	3	1	20	10	+10	13	1.63	7th	17th	R1
2024	UWS	East	9	5	1	3	24	10	+14	18	2.25	5th	9th	DNQ
2025	USLW	Great Forest	10	3	3	4	15	15	0	13	1.30	4th	50th	DNQ
2026	USLW	Great Forest	10	5	5	0	12	15	-3	15	1.50	4th	49th	DNQ
Total	–	–	98	36	49	13	181	197	-16	121	1.23	-	-	-

== Players ==
=== Men's first-team squad ===
As of 2022

Note: Flags indicate national team as defined under FIFA eligibility rules; some limited exceptions apply. Players may hold more than one non-FIFA nationality.

No.	Pos.	Nation	Player
1	GK	USA	Garrett Watson
2	DF	USA	Justin Kopay
3	DF	USA	Giuseppe Croce
4	DF	GHA	William Dodzi
5	DF	USA	Jack Emanuel
6	MF	USA	Ethan Hackenberg
7	MF	USA	Nicholas Graeca
8	MF	USA	Michael Sullivan
9	MF	ENG	Bryan Akongo
10	MF	USA	Nick Kolarac (Captain)
11	MF	ENG	Charlie Lawrence
12	GK	USA	Keaton Jennings
13	MF	USA	Rami Bensasi
14	MF	USA	Gabe Norris
15	FW	USA	Tate Mohney
16	MF	USA	Anthony DiFalco
17	MF	USA	Nolan Hutter
18	FW	USA	Eben McIntyre
19	DF	ESP	Mikel Ubeda
20	MF	USA	Ryan Mertz

No.	Pos.	Nation	Player
21	FW	USA	Nathan Prex
22	DF	USA	Nathan Schlessinger
23	MF	USA	Jonathan Swann
24	MF	USA	Ryan Kopay
26	DF	USA	Ryan Landry
27	FW	USA	Evan Anderson
28	MF	USA	Zander Plizga
29	FW	USA	Tyler Caterino
30	FW	CAN	Brice Gandhi
31	DF	USA	Cole DeVaul
32	DF	ENG	Owain Hawkins
33	DF	USA	Connor Hudson
34	GK	USA	Jacob Conti
35	DF	ISR	Tom Tzabari
36	MF	USA	Evan Thomas
38	FW	USA	Amir Awais
39	MF	USA	Luke Kost
40	FW	USA	Josh DiMatteo
41	GK	USA	Danny Rogers

== Colors and Badge ==
During their time as Pittsburgh Hotspurs, the club predominantly wore blue and yellow. Following the rebrand, the club adopted a new color scheme of dark blue, light blue, black, and gold.

The club's crest is dark blue and gold with stylized trusses and arches evoking the look of the city's 446 bridges. Above the team name is a gold astroid similar to those found on the logo of the Pittsburgh Steelers, flanked by "EST. 2021", the first year the men's and women's first teams competed following the merger. The badge combines elements of the Pittsburgh Hotspurs' crest with the crest used by Steel City FC prior to the merger of the two clubs.

== Stadium ==
Both the men's and women's first teams currently play their home games at Founders Field, a 1,500-seat venue built primarily for rugby in the Pittsburgh suburb of Cheswick. Previously, the men's team played home games at the Ellis School's athletic field in Pittsburgh's Shadyside neighborhood.

The men's team also hosted Michigan Stars FC at the University of Pittsburgh's Ambrose Urbanic Field during the 2024 U.S. Open Cup.

== Honors ==
- National Premier Soccer League
  - Great Lakes Conference Regular Season Champions (2): 2023, 2024
  - NPSL Members Cup (1): 2020
- USL League Two
  - Great Forest Division Regular Season Champions (2): 2025, 2026
