= 2023 United Women's Soccer season =

United Women's Soccer
- Season: 2023
- Champions: Michigan Jaguars
- Top goalscorer: Marcella Barberic & Katelyn Krohn (12 goals)
- All statistics correct as of July 24, 2023.

The 2023 United Women's Soccer season is the 29th season of pro-am women's soccer in the United States, and the seventh season of the UWS league.

== Standings ==
=== Central Conference ===
==== Great Lakes Division ====
Pos	Team	Pld	W	L	T	GF	GA	GD	Pts	Qualification
1	Michigan Legends	7	5	0	2	19	5	+14	17	Playoffs
2	Michigan Jaguars (C)	7	5	1	1	30	13	+17	16	Playoffs
3	Nationals FC	7	5	1	1	25	10	+15	16	
4	Michigan Hawks	7	4	1	2	26	12	+14	14	
5	Futsal Factory Academy	7	2	5	0	8	14	−6	6	
6	Michigan Stars FC	7	1	5	1	10	18	−8	4	
7	Michigan Burn	7	1	5	1	8	33	−25	4	
8	Cap City Athletic 1847	7	1	6	0	6	27	−21	3	

Source: UWS standings
Rules for classification: 1) Head-to-head based on total points; 2) Total wins; 3) Goal difference all league games; 4) Goals scored in league games
(C) Champions

==== Midwest Division ====
Pos	Team	Pld	W	L	T	GF	GA	GD	Pts	Qualification
1	Cincinnati Sirens FC	7	6	0	1	37	2	+35	19	Direct to Second Round of Playoffs
2	Indiana Union	7	4	2	1	33	12	+21	13	
3	Edgewater Castle	7	3	3	1	16	16	0	10	
4	Chicago Rush	5	0	3	2	5	17	−12	2	
5	RBFC Elite	6	0	5	1	7	51	−44	1	

Source: UWS standings
Rules for classification: 1) Head-to-head based on total points; 2) Total wins; 3) Goal difference all league games; 4) Goals scored in league games

=== East Conference ===
==== East Division ====
Pos	Team	Pld	W	L	T	GF	GA	GD	Pts	Qualification
1	FC Buffalo	8	8	0	0	43	5	+38	24	Playoffs
2	Sporting CT	8	7	1	0	35	13	+22	21	Playoffs
3	Coppermine United	8	7	1	0	25	5	+20	21	Playoffs
4	Lancaster Inferno FC	8	6	1	1	16	9	+7	19	Playoffs
5	Maine Footy	8	4	1	3	15	11	+4	15	Playoffs
6	New England Mutiny	8	4	2	2	20	11	+9	14	Playoffs
7	Steel City FC	8	4	3	1	20	10	+10	13	Playoffs
8	Albany Rush	8	4	3	1	21	14	+7	13	Playoffs
9	BC United	8	3	3	2	16	14	+2	11	
10	Erie Commodores FC	8	3	4	1	18	22	−4	10	
11	Scorpions SC	8	3	3	2	14	19	−5	11	
12	New Jersey Copa FC	8	2	6	0	9	27	−18	6	
13	Connecticut Rush	8	1	6	1	15	20	−5	4	
14	Keystone FC	8	1	6	1	11	16	−5	4	
15	Flower City Union	6	1	5	0	6	30	−24	3	
16	Worcester Fuel FC	8	0	7	1	5	37	−32	1	
17	FC Berlin	6	0	6	0	6	32	−26	0	

Source: UWS standings
Rules for classification: 1) Head-to-head based on total points; 2) Total wins; 3) Goal difference all league games; 4) Goals scored in league games

=== Southwest Conference ===
==== Southwest Division ====
Pos	Team	Pld	W	L	T	GF	GA	GD	Pts	Qualification
1	Luxoria FC	5	4	0	1	15	4	+11	13	Division Champions (Note: The top seed of the Southwest division is recognized as the champion of the division, but does not qualify for the national championship.)
2	San Antonio Athenians SC	6	3	2	1	11	8	+3	10	
3	ATX Blues SC	6	2	4	0	4	16	−12	6	
4	San Antonio Runners	5	1	4	0	7	9	−2	3	

Source: UWS standings
Rules for classification: 1) Head-to-head based on total points; 2) Total wins; 3) Goal difference all league games; 4) Goals scored in league games

=== West Conference ===
==== West Division ====
Pos	Team	Pld	W	L	T	GF	GA	GD	Pts	Qualification
1	Santa Clarita Blue Heat	7	5	2	0	25	4	+21	15	Directly to National Semi-finals
2	Calgary Foothills WFC	7	5	2	0	14	7	+7	15	
3	Los Angeles SC	8	4	4	0	12	9	+3	12	
4	FC Arizona	8	4	4	0	10	16	−6	12	
5	Reno Vikings	6	0	6	0	1	26	−25	0	

Source: UWS standings
Rules for classification: 1) Head-to-head based on total points; 2) Total wins; 3) Goal difference all league games; 4) Goals scored in league games

== Playoffs ==
First Round
E4	Lancaster Inferno FC	4
E6	New England Mutiny	3
E1	FC Buffalo	1
E8	Albany Rush	0
E2	Sporting CT	3
E5	Maine Footy	1
E3	Coppermine United	4
E7	Steel City FC	2
GL1	Michigan Legends	0
GL2	Michigan Jaguars	3

Second Round
E1	FC Buffalo	2
E4	Lancaster Inferno FC	4
E2	Sporting CT	4
E3	Coppermine United	2
GL2	Michigan Jaguars	1
MW1	Cincinnati Sirens FC	0

National Semifinals
W1	Santa Clarita Blue Heat	3
E4	Lancaster Inferno FC	2
E2	Sporting CT	2
GL2	Michigan Jaguars	4

National Final
W1	Santa Clarita Blue Heat	0(2)
GL2	Michigan Jaguars	0(4)

== Awards ==
Award	Player	Team	Ref.
All-UWS Goalkeeper of the Year	Jordan Brown	Santa Clarita Blue Heat	
2023 All-UWS Defensive Player of the Year	Natalie Kocsis	Michigan Jaguars	
2023 All-UWS Offensive Player of the Year	Tiffany Weimer	Sporting CT	
2023 All-UWS MVPs	Marcy Barberic	FC Buffalo	
2023 All-UWS MVPs	Katelyn Krohn	Albany Rush	
2023 All-UWS MVPs	Marissa DiGenova	Lancaster Inferno FC	
2023 All-UWS MVPs	Grace Stordy	Calgary Foothills WFC	
UWS Young Player of the Year	Kayla Keefer	Lancaster Inferno FC	
UWS Young Player Honorable Mention	Olivia Dixon	Erie Commodores	
UWS Coach of the Year	Douglas Steinard	Michigan Jaguars	
UWS Team Owner of the Year	Justin Van Til	Maine Footy	
