= All-High Stadium =

Football stadium in Buffalo, New York

All High Stadium
- Robert E. Rich All-High Stadium
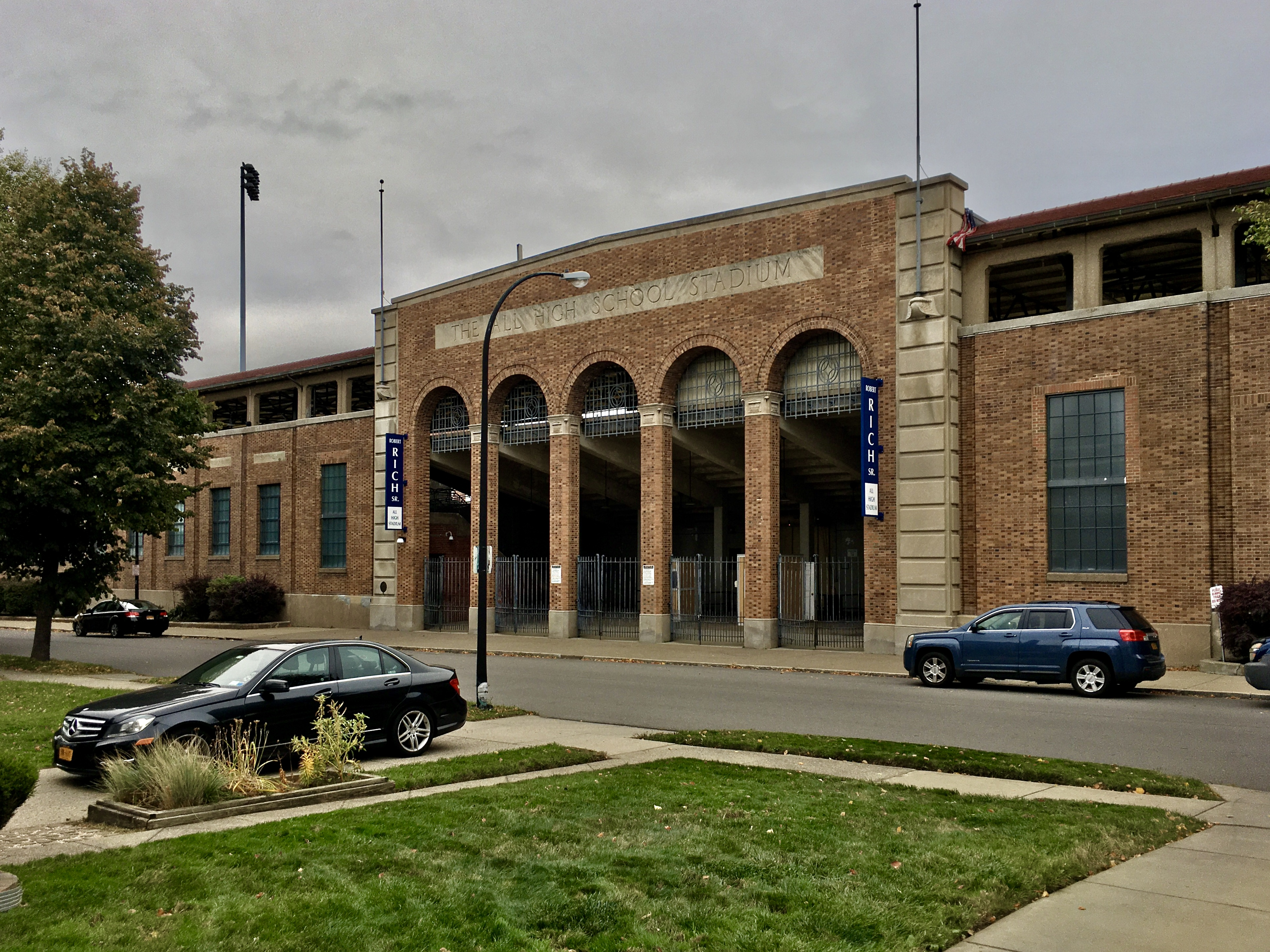
- 2020 photo
- Interactive map of All High Stadium
- Location: 2885 Main Street; Buffalo, New York 14214
- Coordinates: 42°56′35″N 78°49′52″W
- Owner: City of Buffalo
- Operator: City of Buffalo
- Capacity: 5,000 (2007)
- Surface: Artificial Turf
- Public transit: NFTA Metro Rail (Amherst Street)

Construction
- Opened: 1926

Tenants
- Medaille College Mavericks; Men's and women's lacrosse, men's and women's soccer (-2018); Buffalo Storm (USL) (1984); Queen City FC (NPSL) (2007–2008); FC Buffalo (USL2) (2010–2013, 2015–2021, 2024); FC Buffalo Women (UWS) (2021, 2024); Western New York Flash (UWS) (2017–2018)

All-High Stadium (Robert E. Rich All-High Stadium) is a football stadium in Buffalo, New York. It was opened in 1926, and received a Memorial Day dedication on May 29, 1929. The stadium was modeled after classic European soccer stadiums of the time. It is part of the Bennett High School complex. It is bounded by the high school and Main Street to the northwest, Manhattan Avenue to the northeast, Hill Street to the southeast, and Mercer Avenue to the southwest.

All-High Stadium, altered for use in The Natural

== History ==
=== Filming ===
The stadium was used in the filming of a key scene in The Natural, a 1984 film set in the 1930s, as a stand-in for Wrigley Field in Chicago, which was unavailable. Although there is some ivy along the walls suggesting Wrigley, the upper deck in the outfield is more suggestive of Chicago's other major ballpark of that era, Comiskey Park. In some portions of the scene, football lines are visible, which is not anomalous, as both Chicago parks served as homes to football teams at that time.

In fact, All-High Stadium has only a single level of stands with a roof. The upper deck in the film appears to have been inserted in post-production, and the scoreboard either matted in or built as a temporary structure over an existing tall smokestack on a building that stands at the north corner of the stadium, presumably part of Bennett High's heating plant. The actual Wrigley does not have smokestacks, but rather houses and small businesses serving as its backdrops.

Most of The Natural's baseball action scenes were filmed in War Memorial Stadium, which has since been demolished. All-High Stadium still stands, albeit substantially remodeled since The Natural filmed there.

=== Professional tenants ===
All-High Stadium is the former home of USL League 2 team FC Buffalo. It served as the home pitch for the Buffalo Storm of the United Soccer League in 1984. It was utilized by Medaille College's men and women's soccer teams along with its men's and women's lacrosse teams until the end of the 2017–18 academic year. Medaille, did not have their own field prior to 2019 and played its entire 2017–18 season at D'Youville College's Dobson Field. Dobson split time as Medaille's home since it was built in 2015 due to All-High being owned by the City of Buffalo resulting in scheduling conflicts with four of its city high schools that also utilize the facility.

=== Renovation ===
Renovations on the stadium were completed in 2007. As a result, the stadium lost much of its '30s film appearance during the processes. Currently, All-High is configured for a more intimate setting of nearly 5,000 spectators, 4,500 of which are covered seats.

As of 2010, All-High Stadium is one of three high school stadiums in regular use in the city of Buffalo, the second being one at Riverside Institute of Technology and the third being Johnnie B. Wiley Field at War Memorial Stadium.

In 2022, new turf was installed. Buffalo Public Schools did not allow FC Buffalo to play on the new turf which led to Dobson Field at D'Youville College being the Blitzers' temporary home in 2022 and Williamsville South High School in 2023 before reaching an agreement to continue playing at All-High.
