= New Jersey Copa FC =

American soccer club

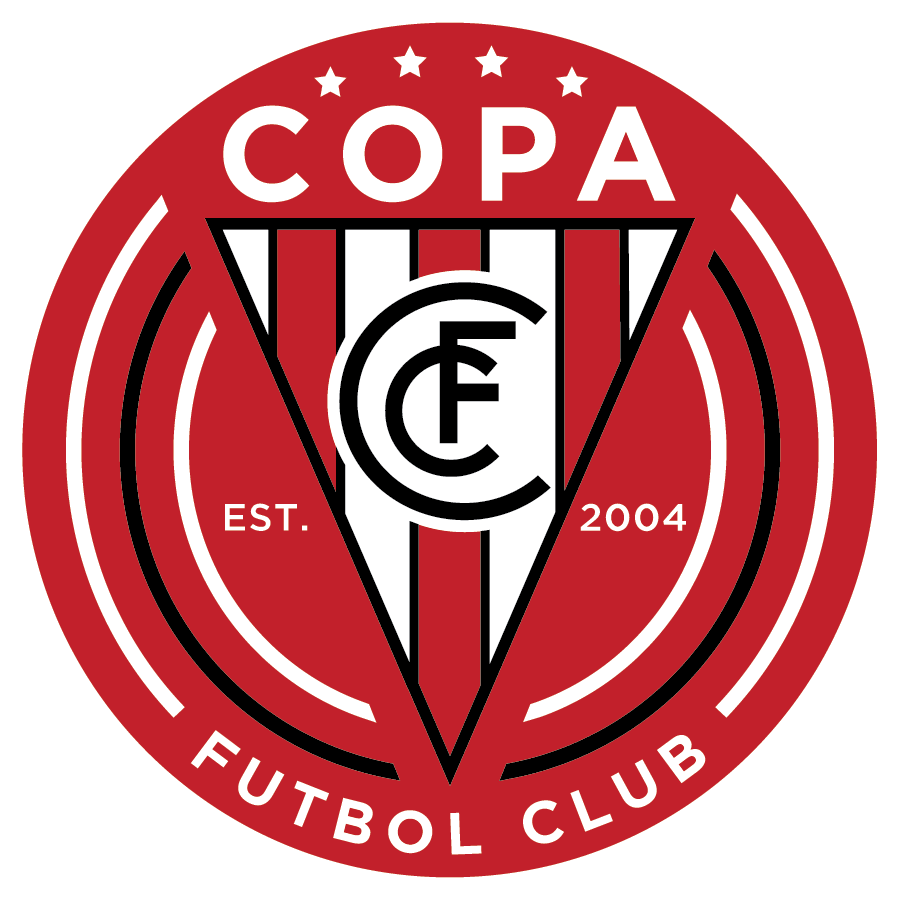
- Full name: New Jersey Copa Futbol Club
- Nickname: Copa
- Founded: 2004; 22 years ago
- Stadium: St. Joseph High School; Metuchen, New Jersey
- Capacity: 1,000
- Owner: Roberto Aguas
- General Manager: Jef Thiffault
- Coach: TBD
- League: USL League Two
- 2024: 10th, Metropolitan Division; Playoffs: DNQ
- Website: fccopa.com
Home colors	Away colors

New Jersey Copa FC are an American pro-am soccer club fielded by the soccer academy "Fútbol Club Copa Academy" from Metuchen, New Jersey. It was founded in 2004 and fields men's, women's, and youth teams in a number of different amateur and semi-professional leagues, in addition to yearly academy teams which compete in various state, regional, and national competitions sanctioned by United States Adult Soccer Association (USASA).

One team competes in USL League Two, one of two fourth-tier soccer league in the United States, within the Metropolitan Division of the Eastern Conference.

It formerly competed in the National Premier Soccer League between 2016 and 2019. The organization also field's a women's team in the Eastern Conference of United Women's Soccer (UWS).

== USL League Two team ==
New Jersey Copa FC finished 2nd in the NPSL's Keystone Conference in 2016 and reached the regional semifinals with a 1–0 win over defending National Champions New York Cosmos B. The team fell to eventual National semifinalist Clarkstown SC Eagles, 0–2, in the next round.

The team qualified via an at-large bid for the U.S. Open Cup tournament in 2017 based on its 2016 league results. In the first round, the team fell to local qualifier FC Motown, 2–0, at home.

=== Year by year ===
Year	League	Regular season	Playoffs	U.S. Open Cup
2016	NPSL	2nd, Keystone	Regional semifinals	Did not enter
2017	NPSL	1st, Keystone	Conference Final	First round
2018	NPSL	5th, Keystone	Did not qualify	Did not qualify
2019	NPSL	9th, Keystone	Did not qualify	Did not qualify
2020	USL League Two	Season canceled due to COVID-19 pandemic		
2021	USL League Two	6th, Metropolitan	Did not qualify	Did not qualify
2022	USL League Two	4th, Metropolitan	Did not qualify	Did not qualify
2023	USL League Two	4th, Metropolitan	Did not qualify	Did not qualify
2024	USL League Two	10th, Metropolitan	Did not qualify	Did not qualify
2025	USL League Two	8th, Metropolitan	Did not qualify	Did not qualify
2026	USL League Two	7th, Metropolitan	Did not qualify	Did not qualify

== United Women's Soccer team ==
New Jersey Copa FC
- Full name: New Jersey Copa Football Club
- Founded: 2015
- Stadium: St. Joseph High School; Metuchen, New Jersey
- Capacity: 1,000
- General Manager: Jef Thiffault
- Coach: TBD
- League: United Women's Soccer
- Website: https://www.fccopa.com/uws

New Jersey Copa FC Women's Team reached the inaugural 2016 UWS National Championship, hosted in California, in their first year competing in the league, where they eventually fell to Santa Clarita Blue Heat 1–2 in double-overtime.

The UWS is the second-tier of professional women's soccer in the United States, below the NWSL.

=== First team ===
Year	League	Regular season	Playoffs
2016	UWS	1st, East Conference	Runner up
2017	UWS	1st, East Conference	Conference Playoff
2018	UWS	8th, East Conference	Did not qualify
2019	UWS	7th, East Conference	Did not qualify
2020	UWS	Season canceled due to COVID-19 pandemic	
2021	UWS	6th, East Conference	Did not qualify
2022	UWS	3rd, Mid-Atlantic Division	Did not qualify
2023	UWS	12th, East Conference	Did not qualify
2024	UWS	8th, East Conference	Did not qualify
2025	USL W League	7th, Metropolitan Division	Did not qualify
2026	USL W League	5th, Metropolitan Division	Did not qualify

=== Second team ===
Year	League	Regular season	Playoffs
2025	UWS	11th, East Conference	did not qualify
