= New York Magic =

- Full name: New York Magic
- Nickname: The Magic
- Founded: 1997
- Stadium: Mazzella Field
- Chairman: Lyndelle Phillips
- Manager: Nino DePasquali
- League: USL W-League (1997-2015); United Women's Soccer (2016-2017)
- Website: http://www.nymagicsoccer.com/
Home colours	Away colours

New York Magic is an American women's soccer team, founded in 1997. The team was an original member of United Women's Soccer from 2016-2017. They played in the USL W-League from 1997 until the league folded after the 2015 season.

The team plays its home games at Iona College in New Rochelle, New York. The club's colors are red, black and white.

Over the years, the team has aimed to attract high level players from many nations and college programs. Its stated mission is to provide an avenue for the development of women soccer players in a highly competitive environment, and to provide family entertainment while developing the game of soccer in its community. Since 2003, it has also developed youth teams that help New York area girls, ages 12 to 16, to train intensively and compete through the Super Y-League.

Magic's head coach, Nino DePasquali, was inducted into the Soccer Hall of Fame in 2007.

== Year-by-year ==
Year	League	Reg. season	Playoffs
1997	USL W-League	5th, Northeast	Did not qualify
1998	USL W-League W-2	1st, Northern	3rd Place
1999	USL W-League W-2	2nd, Northern	3rd Place
2000	USL W-League W-2	3rd, Northern	Did not qualify
2001	USL W-League W-1	7th, Northern	Did not qualify
2002	USL W-League	2nd, Northeast	Conference Semifinals
2003	USL W-League	4th, Northeast	Did not qualify
2004	USL W-League	4th, Northeast	Did not qualify
2005	USL W-League	5th, Northeast	Divisional Round
2006	USL W-League	6th, Northeast	Did not qualify
2007	USL W-League	7th, Northeast	Did not qualify
2008	USL W-League	7th, Northeast	Did not qualify
2009	USL W-League	6th, Northeast	Did not qualify
2010	USL W-League	7th, Northeast	Did not qualify
2011	USL W-League	7th, Northeast	Did not qualify
2012	USL W-League	6th, Northeast	Did not qualify
2013	USL W-League	7th, Northeast	Did not qualify
2014	USL W-League	7th, Northeast	Did not qualify
2015	USL W-League	6th, Northeast	Did not qualify
2016	United Women's Soccer	6th, Eastern	Did not qualify
2017	United Women's Soccer	8th, Eastern	Did not qualify
2018	Played in UPSL		
2019	Played in UPSL		
2020	Season cancelled due to COVID-19		
2021	Played in UPSL		
2022	Played in UPSL		
2023	Played in UPSL		
2024	United Women's Soccer	16th, Eastern	Did not qualify

== Head coach ==
- (Italy) Gaetano "Nino" DePasquale 2012–present

== Stadia ==
- Stadium at Iona College, New Rochelle, New York 2008-date
- Stadium at Manhattan College, Riverdale, New York 2008 (1 game)
