= Santa Clarita Blue Heat =

- Full name: Santa Clarita Blue Heat Football Club
- Nickname: Blue Heat
- Founded: 2008; 18 years ago
- Stadium: Reese Field; Santa Clarita, California
- Owner: Carlos Marroquin
- Head Coach: Leonardo Neveleff
- League: USL W League
- 2024: UWS, 1st, West Conference; Playoff: Champions
Home colours	Away colours

Santa Clarita Blue Heat is an American women's soccer team based in Santa Clarita, California, a suburb of Los Angeles. Founded in 2010, the club was known as the Ventura County Fusion for its first two years of existence.

The team plays its home games at Cougar Stadium on the campus of College of the Canyons. During the Fusion days, they played at Bulldog Stadium on the grounds of Buena High School in the city of Ventura, California.

The team had been a sis organization of the men's Ventura County Fusion team, which plays in the Premier Development League.

The Blue Heat was a member of the United Soccer Leagues USL W-League, the second tier of women's soccer in the United States and Canada. In 2016, the team joined the United Women's Soccer (UWS). The Blue Heat won the first UWS championship by defeating New Jersey Copa FC 2–1 in Santa Clarita on July 30, 2016.

== Players (2018) ==
Note: Flags indicate national team as defined under FIFA eligibility rules; some limited exceptions apply. Players may hold more than one non-FIFA nationality.

No.	Pos.	Nation	Player
1	GK	USA	Lauren Brzykcy
2	FW	USA	Ashley Sanchez
3	MF	USA	Chloe Castaneda
4	DF	CAN	Lauren Sesselmann
5	FW	USA	Penelope Hocking
6	DF	USA	Jessica Haidet
9		USA	Zoe Hasenauer
9	MF	JAM	Olufolasade Adamolekun
11		USA	Sophie Cortez
17		USA	Alea Hyatt
18		USA	Victoria Buda
20	FW	USA	Julia Hernandez

No.	Pos.	Nation	Player
21		USA	Alexa Orrante
22		USA	Hailey Phipps
23		USA	Alyssa Thompson
26		USA	Angeles Escobar
27		USA	Taylor Moorehead
28		USA	Julia Amador Mejias
30		USA	Brooke Littman
31		USA	Cynthia Sanchez
—		USA	Sophia Cortes
—		USA	Jacqueline Villanueva
—	FW	CRC	Fabiola Villalobos

== Notable former players ==
- Edite Fernandes – Portugal
- Deyna Castellanos – Venezuela
- Ana Borges – Portugal
- Carolina Venegas – Costa Rica
- Julia Hernandez – Spain
- Ashley Sanchez – USA
- Lauren Sesselmann – USA/Canada
- Natalia Kuikka – Finland
- Evi Popadinova – Bulgaria

== Year-by-year ==
Year	Division	League	Reg. season	Playoffs
2008	2	USL W-League	7th, Western	did not qualify
2009	2	USL W-League	6th, Western	did not qualify
2010	2	USL W-League	5th, Western	did not qualify
2011	2	USL W-League	1st, Western	Conference Final
2012	2	USL W-League	5th, Western	did not qualify
2013	2	USL W-League	6th, Western	did not qualify
2014	2	USL W-League	6th, Western	did not qualify
2015	2	USL W-League	4th, Western	did not qualify
2016	2	UWS	1st, Western	Champions
2017	2	UWS	1st, Western	Runner up
2018	2	UWS	3rd, Western	did not qualify
2019	2	UWS	3rd, Western	did not qualify
2020	Season cancelled due to COVID-19			
2021	4	UWS	1st, West	Champions
2022	4	UWS	2nd, West	did not qualify
2023	4	UWS	1st, West	Runner up
2024	4	UWS	1st, West	Champions
2025	4	USL W League	1st, SoCal	Conference Semifinals
2026	4	USL W League	2nd, SoCal	Did not qualify
