= Maine Footy =

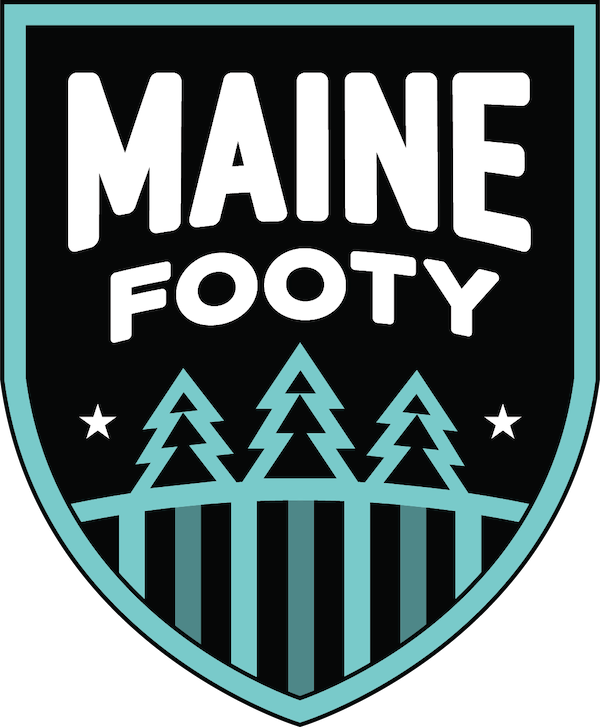
- Full name: Maine Footy
- Nickname: The Tide
- Founded: 2023; 3 years ago
- Stadium: Memorial Stadium; Portland, Maine
- Executive director: Mony Hang
- Head Coach: Paul Baber
- League: United Women's Soccer
- Website: mainefooty.com
Home colors

Maine Footy is an American women's soccer club based in Portland, Maine, United States. Founded in 2023, the team plays in United Women's Soccer (UWS), a pro-am league, in the East Division.

The team plays its home games at Memorial Stadium in Portland. The team's colors are teal and black, and the club's nickname is The Tide. The head coach is Paul Baber.

== History ==
The club was founded in 2023, and embarked on its inaugural season in spring of that year. The club's first home match was a 1–1 draw against New England Mutiny at Memorial Stadium on May 22, 2023. The team finished in fifth place in the East Division in its inaugural season, with a 4–1–3 record, qualifying for the UWS playoffs. The Tide were defeated in the first round of the playoffs by Sporting CT.

The club finished 11th in the East Division in 2024, with a 3–5–0 record.

The club has seen a surge in support following the success of the Portland Hearts of Pine, a men's professional soccer club also based in Portland which started play in 2025.

== Record ==
Year	Division	League	Reg. season	Playoffs
2023	4	United Women's Soccer	5th, East Conference	First Round
2024	4	United Women's Soccer	11th, East Conference	did not qualify
2025	4	United Women's Soccer	8th, East Conference	did not qualify
