= FC Buffalo (women) =

- Full name: Football Club Buffalo
- Founded: 2021; 5 years ago
- Stadium: Coyer Field; Buffalo, New York
- Owners: Nick Mendola
- Head Coach: Mike Idland
- League: USL W League
Home colors	Away colors

FC Buffalo is an American women's soccer club based in Buffalo, New York, United States. Founded in 2021, the team plays in USL W League (USLW), a pro-am league at the second tier of the American Soccer Pyramid, in the East Conference. FC Buffalo is the sister team of USL League Two club FC Buffalo.

The team plays its home games at Coyer Field in Buffalo. The team's colors are blue, gold and white.

== History ==
In 2021, club owner Nicholas Mendola announced the launch of a women's soccer team, which started play in May. On March 5, the club announced Nikki Bartholomew as the first manager of FC Buffalo. In their first UWS season, FC Buffalo finished in first place in the Eastern Conference, with a record of 7–2–1. FC Buffalo hosted the East Conference playoffs, winning their first match against Lancaster Inferno FC 3–2. In the Eastern Conference Final FC Buffalo lost 2–0 against CT Fusion.

On May 9, 2022, the team announced that they would play their home games for the 2022 season at Dobson Field on the campus of D'Youville University while All-High Stadium is renovated. The club again only lost once in the regular season, then winning a pair of playoff games to reach the National Championship weekend. FC Buffalo would fall against Calgary Foothills WFC in the semi-finals, ending their playoff run. After the renovations at All High were completed, Buffalo Public Schools initially declined to have the team play its matches there for the 2023 season, which forced an emergency field location at Williamsville South High School. Then in April 2024, the club were welcomed back to All-High ahead of the upcoming season. The women won the 2024 Iron Division and the right to host the National Championship weekend.

== Players and staff ==
=== Current squad ===
As of 21 February 2025

Note: Flags indicate national team as defined under FIFA eligibility rules; some limited exceptions apply. Players may hold more than one non-FIFA nationality.

No.	Pos.	Nation	Player
1	GK	USA	Shea Vanderbosch
2	FW	NGA	Ekemini Udoga
3	DF	USA	Regan Moore
4	DF	USA	Erin Weir
6	DF	USA	Anna Bean
5	MF	USA	KK Panella
7	MF	CAN	Eileen Solomon
9	DF	USA	Claire DeAngelis
10	FW	USA	Sarah Woods
12	MF	USA	Lindsay Lenhard
13	FW	USA	Ava Plezia
14	DF	USA	Baillie Colling
17	DF	PUR	Natasha Fowler-Varon
18	MF	USA	Rosie Bandura

No.	Pos.	Nation	Player
19	FW	USA	Paige Szymanski
21	MF	USA	Laiken Kiser
24	FW	USA	Katie Sellers
28	MF	USA	Izzy Schmidt
33	MF	USA	Gianna Tuzzolino
42	GK	USA	Jordan Senz
50	DF	USA	Lexie Thompson
-	FW	USA	Grace Kulniszewski
—	FW	USA	Kylie Miranto
-	MF	USA	Payton Robertson
-	GK	USA	Rylee Kumer
-	GK	USA	Bella Simoncelli
-	DF	USA	Megan Gerber

=== Management and staff ===
As of February 21, 2025

Executive Staff
Position	Staff
Owner	(United States) Nick Mendola
Director of Women's Soccer	(United States) Liz Mantel
Technical Staff
Position	Staff
Head coach	(United States) Mike Idland
Assistant coach	(United States) Dani Martinez
Assistant coach	(United States) Kate Rachwal

== All-time record ==
Year	League	W-L-D	GF	GA	GD	Regular season	Playoffs
2021	United Women's Soccer	7-2-1	23	14	+9	1st, East Division	Lost East Conference Finals
2022	United Women's Soccer	7-1-2	23	7	+16	1st, Penn-NY Division	Lost National Semi-Finals
2023	United Women's Soccer	8-0-0	43	5	+38	1st, East Division	Lost Second Round
2024	United Women's Soccer	6-1-1	23	7	+16	1st, Iron Division	Lost National Semi-finals
2025	USL W League	5-3-2	21	11	+10	3rd, Great Forest Division	did not qualify
2026	USL W League	3-1-6	21	24	–3	5th, Great Forest Division	did not qualify
Total	6 Seasons	36-8-12	154	68	+86		

== Playoff results ==
Season	Game	Visiting	Home
2021	East Conference Semi-Finals	Lancaster Inferno 2	FC Buffalo 3
2021	East Conference Finals	CT Fusion 2	FC Buffalo 0
2022	East Conference Semi-Finals	FC Buffalo 2	New England Mutiny 1
2022	East Conference Finals	FC Buffalo 3	Coppermine United 2
2022	National Semi-Finals	Calgary Foothills 4	FC Buffalo 1
2023	First Round	(E1)FC Buffalo 1	(E8) Albany Rush 0
2023	Second Round	(E1)FC Buffalo 2	(E4)Lancaster Inferno 4

== Honors ==
- UWS Eastern Conference Regular Season Champions: 2021
- UWS Penn-NY Division Champions: 2022
- UWS Eastern Conference (Playoff) Champions: 2022
- UWS Penn-NY Division Champions: 2023
- UWS Iron Division Champions: 2024

== Media ==
External videos
- FC Buffalo home game broadcasts

All FC Buffalo home games are streamed live on the club's SportsEngine Play channel.

The club's broadcast team consists of Jeffrey Boyd on play-by-play, and Mike Babcock on color commentary.
