= 2024 United Women's Soccer season =

United Women's Soccer
- Season: 2024
- Champions: Santa Clarita Blue Heat
- Matches: 153
- Goals: 997 (6.52 per match)
- Biggest home win: Coppermine United 12–0 New York Magic (6/29)
- Biggest away win: Players SC 0–8 Calgary Foothills WFC (5/19)
- Highest scoring: Coppermine United 12–0 New York Magic (6/29)
- Longest winning run: New England Mutiny (11 wins)
- Longest unbeaten run: New England Mutiny (11 games)
- Longest losing run: Worcester Fuel FC & Michigan Burn (8 games)
- All statistics correct as of 14:31, July 22, 2024 (UTC).

The 2024 United Women's Soccer season is the 30th season of pro-am women's soccer in the United States, and the eighth season of the UWS league.

== Team changes ==
=== New teams ===
- Black Mountain Torrent
- Elite 14 SC
- Pass FC
- Troy City WFC
- Players SC

=== Promoted from UWS2 ===
- Hudson Valley Crusaders
- Steel United NJ

=== Renamed Teams ===
- Flower City Union to Flower City 1872

=== Demoted to UWS2 ===
- Reno Vikings

=== Departing Teams ===
- RBFC Elite
- Lancaster Inferno FC
- BC United
- Scorpions SC
- Keystone FC
- Luxoria SC
- San Antonio Athenians SC
- ATX Blues SC
- San Antonio Runners

== Standings ==
=== East Conference ===
Pos	Team	Pld	W	L	T	GF	GA	GD	Pts	Qualification
1	New England Mutiny (Q)	10	10	0	0	38	4	+34	30	Playoffs
2	Sporting CT	10	8	2	0	32	8	+24	24	
3	FC Buffalo (Q)	8	6	1	1	23	7	+16	19	Playoffs
4	Coppermine United	9	6	3	0	42	7	+35	18	
5	Steel City FC	9	5	1	3	24	10	+14	18	
6	Hudson Valley Crusaders	8	5	1	2	26	7	+19	17	
7	Black Mountain Torrent	8	5	2	1	19	14	+5	16	
8	New Jersey Copa FC	8	5	3	0	23	11	+12	15	
9	Flower City 1872	8	3	4	1	17	15	+2	10	
10	New Jersey Alliance	6	3	2	1	14	17	−3	10	
11	Maine Footy	8	3	5	0	15	11	+4	9	
12	Connecticut Rush	8	2	4	2	13	23	−10	8	
13	Albany Rush	8	2	4	2	12	25	−13	8	
14	Erie Commodores FC	8	2	5	1	20	25	−5	7	
15	FC Berlin	8	1	7	0	4	32	−28	3	
16	New York Magic	8	1	7	0	7	46	−39	3	
17	Steel United NJ	7	0	7	0	2	29	−27	0	
18	Worcester Fuel FC	8	0	8	0	2	39	−37	0	

Updated to match(es) played on completed. Source: UWS standings
Rules for classification: 1) Head-to-head based on total points; 2) Total wins; 3) Goal difference all league games; 4) Goals scored in league games
(Q) Qualified for the phase indicated

=== Midwest Conference ===
Pos	Team	Pld	W	L	T	GF	GA	GD	Pts	Qualification
1	Michigan Jaguars (Q)	10	9	0	1	41	6	+35	28	Playoffs
2	Indiana Union	9	7	2	0	38	12	+26	21	
3	Michigan Legends	8	6	1	1	28	8	+20	19	
4	Edgewater Castle	8	5	3	0	31	14	+17	15	
5	Nationals SC	9	4	2	3	16	15	+1	15	
6	Michigan Hawks	7	4	2	1	16	7	+9	13	
7	Elite 14 SC	9	4	4	1	20	21	−1	13	
8	Rockford Raptors	7	4	3	0	13	15	−2	12	
9	Pass FC	9	4	5	0	15	21	−6	12	
10	Cap City Athletic	9	2	3	4	19	15	+4	10	
11	Michigan Stars FC	9	2	5	2	14	21	−7	8	
12	Firebirds SC	7	2	4	1	6	19	−13	7	
13	Troy City WFC	9	1	5	3	10	22	−12	6	
14	Chicago Rush	5	1	3	1	4	19	−15	4	
15	Cincinnati Sirens FC	0	0	0	0	0	0	0	0	
16	Indiana United	4	0	4	0	0	13	−13	0	
17	Michigan Burn	8	0	8	0	4	44	−40	0	

Source: UWS standings
Rules for classification: 1) Head-to-head based on total points; 2) Total wins; 3) Goal difference all league games; 4) Goals scored in league games
(Q) Qualified for the phase indicated

=== West Conference ===
Pos	Team	Pld	W	L	T	GF	GA	GD	Pts	Qualification
1	Santa Clarita Blue Heat (Q)	8	8	0	0	31	2	+29	24	Playoffs
2	Calgary Foothills WFC	6	4	2	0	24	3	+21	12	
3	Los Angeles SC	6	3	3	0	13	14	−1	9	
4	FC Arizona	8	1	6	1	5	32	−27	4	
5	Players SC	6	0	5	1	2	24	−22	1	

Source: UWS standings
Rules for classification: 1) Head-to-head based on total points; 2) Total wins; 3) Goal difference all league games; 4) Goals scored in league games
(Q) Qualified for the phase indicated

== Playoffs ==
National Semifinals
W1	Santa Clarita Blue Heat	2
E3	FC Buffalo	0
E1	New England Mutiny	5
M1	Michigan Jaguars	0

National Final
W1	Santa Clarita Blue Heat	2 (6)
E1	New England Mutiny	2 (5)
