= 2022 United Women's Soccer season =

United Women's Soccer
- Season: 2022
- Champions: Chicago Mustangs
- Matches: 222
- Goals: 924 (4.16 per match)
- Top goalscorer: Nina Nicosia (12 goals)
- All statistics correct as of July 24, 2022.

The 2022 United Women's Soccer season is the 28th season of pro-am women's soccer in the United States, and the sixth season of the UWS league.

== Standings ==
=== Central Conference ===
==== Great Lakes Division ====
Pos	Team	Pld	W	L	T	GF	GA	GD	Pts	Qualification
1	Corktown AFC Hawks	8	6	0	2	28	5	+23	20	2022 Great Lakes Division Championship Playoffs
2	Nationals FC	8	5	1	2	34	8	+26	17	2022 Great Lakes Division Championship Playoffs
3	Michigan Jaguars	8	3	3	2	28	22	+6	11	
4	Cap City Athletic 1847	8	3	5	0	15	23	−8	9	
5	Muskegon Risers SC	8	0	8	0	7	54	−47	0	

Source: UWS standings
Rules for classification: 1) Head-to-head based on total points; 2) Total wins; 3) Goal difference all league games; 4) Goals scored in league games

==== Midwest Division ====
Pos	Team	Pld	W	L	T	GF	GA	GD	Pts	Qualification
1	Chicago Mustangs	8	7	0	1	60	4	+56	22	2022 Midwest Division Championship Playoffs
2	St. Louis Scott Gallagher	8	6	1	1	44	4	+40	19	2022 Midwest Division Championship Playoffs
3	Indiana Union	8	4	4	0	32	20	+12	12	
4	Illinois Premier	8	1	6	1	7	56	−49	4	
5	RBFC Elite	8	0	7	1	1	60	−59	1	

Source: UWS standings
Rules for classification: 1) Head-to-head based on total points; 2) Total wins; 3) Goal difference all league games; 4) Goals scored in league games

==== Heartland Division ====
Pos	Team	Pld	W	L	T	GF	GA	GD	Pts	Qualification
1	KC Courage	8	6	1	1	21	4	+17	19	2022 Central Conference Playoffs
2	Gretna Elite Academy	8	5	2	1	20	7	+13	16	
3	FC Wichita	8	5	2	1	17	7	+10	16	
4	Sporting Nebraska FC	8	4	3	1	12	10	+2	13	
5	Side FC 92	8	3	4	1	12	16	−4	10	
6	Arkansas Wolves	8	1	6	1	3	16	−13	4	
7	Arkansas Comets FC	8	0	6	2	3	28	−25	2	

Source: UWS standings
Rules for classification: 1) Head-to-head based on total points; 2) Total wins; 3) Goal difference all league games; 4) Goals scored in league games

=== East Conference ===
==== Mid-Atlantic Division ====
Pos	Team	Pld	W	L	T	GF	GA	GD	Pts	Qualification
1	Coppermine United	10	8	1	1	18	8	+10	25	2022 East Conference Playoffs
2	Lancaster Inferno FC	10	8	1	1	27	9	+18	25	
3	New Jersey Copa FC	10	3	7	0	20	21	−1	9	
4	Paisley Athletic FC	10	3	7	0	14	19	−5	9	
5	Keystone FC	10	2	8	0	15	37	−22	6	

Source: UWS standings
Rules for classification: 1) Head-to-head based on total points; 2) Total wins; 3) Goal difference all league games; 4) Goals scored in league games

==== New England Division ====
Pos	Team	Pld	W	L	T	GF	GA	GD	Pts	Qualification
1	New England Mutiny	10	9	1	0	27	8	+19	27	2022 East Conference Playoffs
2	Connecticut Fusion	10	6	2	2	25	9	+16	20	2022 East Conference Playoffs
3	Albany Rush	10	5	4	1	30	14	+16	16	
4	Scorpions SC	10	5	5	0	25	14	+11	15	
5	Connecticut Rush	10	2	6	2	14	25	−11	8	
6	Worcester Smiles	10	0	9	1	3	54	−51	1	

Source: UWS standings
Rules for classification: 1) Head-to-head based on total points; 2) Total wins; 3) Goal difference all league games; 4) Goals scored in league games

==== Penn-NY Division ====
Pos	Team	Pld	W	L	T	GF	GA	GD	Pts	Qualification
1	FC Buffalo	10	7	1	2	23	7	+16	23	2022 East Conference Playoffs
2	Rochester Lady Lancers	10	7	1	2	23	7	+16	23	
3	Erie Commodores FC	10	5	2	3	23	21	+2	18	
4	FC Berlin	10	0	7	3	8	25	−17	3	
5	Pittsburgh Hotspurs	10	0	8	2	13	30	−17	2	

Source: UWS standings
Rules for classification: 1) Head-to-head based on total points; 2) Total wins; 3) Goal difference all league games; 4) Goals scored in league games

=== Southern Conference ===
==== Southeast Division ====
Pos	Team	Pld	W	L	T	GF	GA	GD	Pts	Qualification
1	Atlanta Panthers SC	7	7	0	0	32	1	+31	21	2022 South Conference Playoffs
2	Atlanta Fire United	8	4	3	1	21	11	+10	13	
3	FC Birmingham	7	2	4	1	8	31	−23	7	
4	Pensacola FC	6	0	6	0	0	18	−18	0	

Source: UWS standings
Rules for classification: 1) Head-to-head based on total points; 2) Total wins; 3) Goal difference all league games; 4) Goals scored in league games

==== Southwest Division ====
Pos	Team	Pld	W	L	T	GF	GA	GD	Pts	Qualification
1	FC Austin Elite (Note: FC Austin Elite were sanctioned by the league due to allegations of misconduct and removed from the playoffs and replaced by the second place team)	10	8	0	2	16	3	+13	26	
2	San Antonio Athenians SC	10	7	1	2	32	5	+27	23	2022 South Conference Playoffs
3	Luxoria FC	10	6	4	0	27	9	+18	18	
4	Williamson County FC	10	4	6	0	11	20	−9	12	
5	San Antonio Runners	10	2	8	0	9	22	−13	6	
6	CTX Hornets	10	1	9	0	4	40	−36	3	

Source: UWS standings
Rules for classification: 1) Head-to-head based on total points; 2) Total wins; 3) Goal difference all league games; 4) Goals scored in league games

=== West Conference ===
==== West Division ====
Pos	Team	Pld	W	L	T	GF	GA	GD	Pts	Qualification
1	Calgary Foothills WFC	10	10	0	0	29	7	+22	30	2022 National Championship (Note: The top seed of the West Conference goes directly to the National Championship, bypassing regional playoffs due to the travel & time constraints involved during the season.)
2	Santa Clarita Blue Heat	10	8	2	0	26	9	+17	24	
3	SASA Impact FC	10	4	5	1	17	17	0	13	
4	FC Arizona	10	4	6	0	24	24	0	12	
5	Los Angeles SC	10	3	6	1	15	18	−3	10	
6	Kongo SC	10	0	10	0	1	37	−36	0	

Source: UWS standings
Rules for classification: 1) Head-to-head based on total points; 2) Total wins; 3) Goal difference all league games; 4) Goals scored in league games

== Playoffs ==
Division Championship
MW1	Chicago Mustangs	3
MW2	St. Louis Scott Gallagher	1
GL1	Corktown AFC Hearts	4
GL2	Nationals FC	1

Conference Semifinals
MW1	Chicago Mustangs	4
GL1	Corktown AFC Hearts	3
NE1	New England Mutiny	1
PNY1	FC Buffalo	2
MA1	Coppermine United	1
NE2	Connecticut Fusion	0

Conference Finals
MW1	Chicago Mustangs	3
HL1	KC Courage	0
SW2	San Antonio Athenians SC	w/o (Note: The conference championship match between the southeast and southwest divisions was cancelled with Atlanta Panthers' inability to play past the regular season due to a roster shortage)
SE1	Atlanta Panthers SC
PNY1	FC Buffalo	3
MA1	Coppermine United	2

National Semifinals
MW1	Chicago Mustangs	1
SW2	San Antonio Athenians SC	0
PNY1	FC Buffalo	1
W1	Calgary Foothills WFC	4

National Final
MW1	Chicago Mustangs	2
W1	Calgary Foothills WFC	1
