= United Women's Soccer =

American women's semi-profession soccer league

- Founded: December 16, 2015; 10 years ago
- Country: Metuchen, New Jersey, United States
- Other club from: Canada
- Confederation: CONCACAF
- Number of clubs: 32 (D1); 7 (D2)
- Current champions: Edgewater Castle FC (2025)
- Most championships: Santa Clarita Blue Heat (3)
- Broadcaster(s): Eleven Sports
- Website: uwssoccer.com
- Current: 2026 UWS season

United Women's Soccer (UWS) is a national pro-am women's soccer league in the United States. The league was founded in 2015 as a response to the dual problems of disorganization in the WPSL and of the folding of the original USL W-League. The league began play in May 2016 with eleven teams in two conferences. The first league currently has 25 teams in four conferences and second league currently has ten teams in a single conference.

== History ==
=== Background ===
In the summer of 2015, disorganization and the inability to field teams led to many last-minute changes in the WPSL playoffs. This, combined with a general lack of competitiveness due to rapid expansion, led to frustration from many long-time WPSL teams. The 2014 WPSL final four hosts ASA Chesapeake Charge elected to skip the 2015 WPSL playoffs altogether as did the entire Sunshine division, Fire & Ice SC was a no-show, and the New England Mutiny published a threatening response to how WPSL as a league was run and was regressing.

Later that year, the USL W-League suddenly announced that it would be ceasing operations. There had been no outward signs that the league or its teams were struggling, but the league had been contracting steadily over the preceding several years - from 30 teams in four divisions for 2012 to just 18 teams in three divisions for 2015 - and many of the teams that had left were recent finalists (Buffalo Flash, Vancouver Whitecaps Women, Pali Blues, Ottawa Fury Women, and several Washington D.C.-area teams) leaving relatively few flagship teams.

=== Founding ===
Spearheaded by the New England Mutiny (a former member of the short-lived WPSL Elite), UWS's first five teams were leaked on December 15 ahead of the league's official announcement the next day; UWS hopes to provide a true second division beneath the NWSL. Negotiations to create the league since the beginning of the WPSL/W-League offseason, with plans that the league will be a national league of two conferences. The eight founding teams, all in the northeastern US and eastern Canada, were the Mutiny, fellow WPSL breakaway Lancaster Inferno FC, the W-League teams Laval Comets, Long Island Rough Riders, New York Magic, North Jersey Valkyries, and Quebec Dynamo ARSQ looking for a new league, and the expansion team New Jersey Copa FC.

UWS will be sanctioned through USASA, as the W-League and WPSL were.

=== Rapid early growth ===
Between founding and the beginning of the inaugural season, hints of the desired second Western conference came to light in late January and was made official on February 5, with the first five revealed teams being Real Salt Lake Women and Houston Aces (both previously of WPSL), and the Santa Clarita Blue Heat, the Colorado Storm, and the Colorado Pride (all previously of the W-League).

On March 9, 2016, it was announced that the Canadian Soccer Association would not sanction teams in Laval & Quebec for play in UWS, leaving the league with only 11 teams for its inaugural season.

On November 1, 2016, Grand Rapids FC announced they would add a women's team, which would begin play in 2017 in a new Midwest division of United Women's Soccer. Three more Midwest teams (FC Indiana, Fort Wayne United Soccer Club, and the Detroit Sun FC) were announced a month later, with the desire to add more mentioned. Further expansion ahead of the 2017 season included the Michigan Legends FC in Brighton, Indy Premier SC in Noblesville, the Syracuse Development Academy, the So Cal Crush FC in Montrose, and the Calgary Foothills WFC. On March 3, 2017, the Western New York Flash announced that they would establish a team for the 2017 season. This announcement came nearly two months after the organization, who had won the 2016 NWSL Championship, sold its NWSL franchise rights and roster which formed the North Carolina Courage. In April, the rebranded Rochester Lancers team joined the Flash in Western New York with a UWS side, the Rochester Lady Lancers. They effectively replaced the Flash, which moved team operations to their original home of Buffalo, in Rochester.

=== Western contraction period ===
While UWS would see continued stability in the East and Midwest conferences, attempts to establish teams in the west would prove less successful. From 2017 to 2018, UWS grew from having just five teams west of the Mississippi River to having eleven, with the return of the Colorado Pride, joining of LA Galaxy OC academy, and four new teams in Texas, causing the West conference to split into a West and a Southwest conference. However, despite each conference adding a team for the 2019 season, each conference also lost two teams - including UWS founding member Real Salt Lake Women who rebranded as the Utah Royals Reserves in a return to WPSL - bringing the total number of teams west of the Mississippi to nine. Ahead of the 2020 season, four more UWS teams - Houston Aces, Colorado Pride, LAG OC, and the El Paso Surf - also left for WPSL, bringing the total back down to five.

=== Further expansion and creation of League Two ===
In the 2020 off-season, UWS continued to add more clubs to the league and expanding their reach, including the creation of the Southeast Conference.

On February 6, 2020, UWS announced the creation of UWS League Two, a 2nd division focused on the U20-U23 age group. League Two will consist of a mix of UWS reserve teams and clubs that will be seeking to join UWS in the future. It will feature a promotion and relegation relationship with UWS starting in 2021, though the nature of how clubs will move up and down is still under discussion. The Midwest conference was the first announced for the new league, with the first four teams of said conference consisting of three independent sides as well as the reserves of Detroit Sun FC.

== League One ==
As of May 15, 2026

Team	Stadium	City	Founded	First UWS Season
Great Lakes Division
AC Grand Rapids Academy	MSA Fieldhouse	Grand Rapids, Michigan	2026	2026
FC Pontiac	Wisner Stadium	Pontiac, Michigan		2025
Flint City AFC		Flint, Michigan		2025
Michigan Jaguars FC		Novi, Michigan		2022
Michigan Jaguars FC II		Novi, Michigan		2022
Michigan Legends FC	Legacy Center	Brighton, Michigan	2017	2017 (Note: Team was on hiatus from 2020–2023)
Michigan Stars FC	Michigan Stars Sports Center	Washington Township, Michigan	2021	2021
Midland Fusion	901 Soccer Dr	Midland, Michigan	2014	2026
Midwest United FC U23	Midwest United FC Soccer Complex	Grand Rapids, Michigan	2015	2026
Pinnacle FC		Auburn Hills, Michigan		2026
Troy City WFC		Troy, Michigan	2024	2024
Tulip City United	Holland High School	Holland, Michigan	2025	2026
Mid-Atlantic Division
Baltimore Blast		Baltimore, Maryland	1980	2025
Baltimore Lady Warriors	TBD	Baltimore Maryland	2024	2024 (Division Two); 2025 (Division One)
Lancaster FC	Weaver Sports Complex	Lancaster, Pennsylvania	2026	2026
MSI Pro	Walt Whitman High School	Rockville, Maryland		2024 (Division Two); 2025 (Division One)
Racing Power FC		Baltimore, Maryland	2020	2025
Midwest Division
Berber City FC	ComEd Recreation Center	Chicago, Illinois	2026	2026
Chicago Inter Soccer Club	Chicago Inter Sports Complex	Chicago, Illinois	2026	2026
DeKalb County United	Northern Illinois University	Dekalb, Illinois		2025
Force FC	MAC Athletic Complex	Crystal Lake, Illinois		2025
Rockford Raptors Soccer Club	Mercyhealth Sportscore	Loves Park, Illinois	1994	2024
Northeast Division
Connecticut Legends	CFC Park	Bethany, Connecticut	2026	2026
Maine Footy	Memorial Stadium	Portland, Maine	2023	2023
Maine Mystics	Edward Little High School	Auburn, Maine	2026	2026
New England Mutiny	Lusitano Stadium	Ludlow, Massachusetts	1999	2016
Worcester Wanderers FC	Worcester State University	Worcester, Massachusetts	2026	2026
West Division
Club Atletico Internacional	Great Park Sports Complex	Irvine, California	2023	2026
Los Angeles SC	TBD	Los Angeles, California	1951	2022
San Fernando Valley FC	Santa Monica High School	Santa Monica, California	2026	2026
SoCal FC	TBD	Torrance, California		2025
United City FC II	La Cañada High School	La Cañada Flintridge, California	2026	2026

== League Two ==
As of April 23, 2024

Team	Stadium	City	Founded	First UWS Season
Chicago Rush	TBD	Chicago, Illinois		2023
Crystal Lake Force II	MAC Athletic Complex	Crystal Lake, Illinois		2025
Firebirds SC	TBD	Lombard, Illinois	1994	2024 (Division One); 2025 (Division Two)
River Light FC	TBD	Aurora, Illinois		2025
Rockford Raptors Soccer Club II	Mercyhealth Sportscore	Loves Park, Illinois	1994	2024
Steel City FC	Founders Field (Chestwick)	Pittsburgh, Pennsylvania	2020	2020 (Division One); 2024 (Division Two)
Steel United Hudson Valley II		Bryn Mawr, Pennsylvania	2010	2024
Team Chicago		Chicago, Illinois		2025
Western United FC II				2025
Worcester Fuel FC II	Commerce Bank Field at Foley Stadium	Worcester, Massachusetts	2018	2025

== Former members ==
Team	Stadium	City	Founded	First UWS Season	Last UWS Season	Notes
Albany Rush		Albany, New York	2021	2021	2024	Joined WPSL
AFC Ann Arbor	Concordia University Ann Arbor	Ann Arbor, Michigan	2014	2019	2019	Joined USL W League
Atlanta Panthers SC	Franklin Gateway Sports Complex	Marietta, Georgia	2016	2021	2022	
ATX Blues SC	TBD	Austin, Texas	2023	2023	2023	
BC United		Endicott, New York		2023	2023	
Cap City Athletic 1847	TBD			2024	2025	
Delaware Diamonds		Wilmington, Delaware		2023	2024	
FC Austin Elite	Round Rock Multipurpose Complex	Round Rock, Texas	2016	2018	2022	Folded
Black Mountain Torrent		Pennsylvania	1978	2023 (Division Two); 2024 (Division One)	2024	
Bat Country FC	Round Rock Multipurpose Complex	Round Rock, Texas	2017	2020	2021	Joined WPSL
Brooklyn City FC	Steinberg Athletic Complex	Brooklyn, New York	2017	2020	2022	Joined NY Metropolitan Women's Soccer League
Calgary Foothills WFC	Calgary Soccer Centre	Calgary, Alberta	2015	2017	2024	
Chicago Mustangs	Harper College	Palatine, Illinois	2012	2021	2022	
Cincinnati Sirens FC	Fairfield Soccer Stadium	Fairfield, Ohio		2023	2024	
Colorado Pride	Washburn Field	Colorado Springs, Colorado	1994	2016	2019	Joined WPSL
Colorado Storm	Sports Authority Stadium	Parker, Colorado	2014	2016	2016	
Connecticut Fusion	Farmington Sports Arena	Farmington, Connecticut	2018	2018	2022	
Connecticut Rush	New Haven, Connecticut	Farmington, Connecticut	2021	2021	2024	
Coppermine United		Baltimore, Maryland		2022	2024	
Dallas International FC	Greenhill School Field	Addison, Texas	2020	2020	2020	
Detroit City FC	Keyworth Stadium	Hamtramck, Michigan	2019	2020	2021	Joined USL W League
Detroit Sun FC	Ultimate Soccer Arenas	Pontiac, Michigan	2016	2017	2019	
Edgewater Castle FC	TBD	Chicago, Illinois		2023	2025	Joined USL W League
Elite 14 Performance (E14)	TBD	Southeast, Michigan		2024	2024	
El Paso Surf	Socorro Athletic Complex	El Paso, Texas	2018	2018	2019	Joined WPSL
Erie Commodores FC	Erie Sports Center	Erie, Pennsylvania	2021	2022	2024	
Epic FC				2024	2024	
FC Arizona	Bell Bank Park	Mesa, Arizona	2017	2022	2024	
FC Berlin	Buffalo State College	Buffalo, New York	2022	2022	2024	
FC Birmingham	TBA	Birmingham, Alabama	2020	2022	2022	Joined WPSL
FC Buffalo	All-High Stadium	Buffalo, New York	2021	2021	2024	Joined USL W League
FC Indiana	Newton Park	Lakeville, Indiana	2003	2017	2017	Independent
FC Wichita	Stryker Soccer Complex	Wichita, Kansas	2020	2021	2022	
Flower City 1872	Rochester Community Sports Complex Stadium	Rochester, New York	2023	2023	2024	Joined USL W League
Fort Wayne United FC Gryphons	Hefner Stadium	Fort Wayne, Indiana	2016	2017	2018	
Futsal Factory Academy	Dexter High School	Dexter, Michigan	2014	2023	2014	
Future FC	TBD	Corona, California	2021	2025	2025	
Genesee FC	Atwood Stadium	Flint, Michigan	2018	2018	2018	
Gretna Elite Academy	UNO Caniglia Field	Omaha, Nebraska	2018	2021	2022	
HAR FC	Houston Sports Park	Houston, Texas	2018	2018	2018	
Houston Aces	Houston Sports Park	Houston, Texas	2012	2016	2019	Joined WPSL
Hudson Valley Crusaders		Saugerties, New York		2023 (Division Two); 2024 (Division One)	2024	
Indiana Union	Grand Park Event Center	Indianapolis, Indiana	2017	2017	2024	
Indiana United	TBD	Merrillville, Indiana		2024	2025	
Inland Empire FC	TBD	San Bernardino, California	2011	2025	2025	Joined UPSL
KC Courage	Rockhurst University	Kansas City, Missouri	2014	2021	2022	Joined WPSL
Keystone FC	TBD	Mechanicsburg, Pennsylvania		2022	2023	
KMSA		Linden, New Jersey		2023	2023	
Kongo SC	Spence Eccles Ogden Community Sports Complex	Ogden, Utah	2013	2021	2022	
LA Galaxy OC	Championship Soccer Stadium	Irvine, California	2018	2018	2020	
Lancaster Inferno FC	Pucillo Field	Millersville, Pennsylvania	2008	2016	2023	
Lansing United	East Lansing Soccer Complex	Lansing, Michigan	2018	2018	2021	
Livonia City FC	Schoolcraft College	Livonia, Michigan	2015	2023	2023	
Long Island Rough Riders	Hofstra University Soccer Stadium	Hempstead, New York	2003	2016	2021	Joined USL W League
Luxoria FC	TBD	Dallas, Texas		2022	2023	
Michigan Burn	The Sports Academy	Chesterfield Township, Michigan	2006	2023	2024	
Michigan Hawks	Corner Ballpark	Detroit, Michigan	2020	2022 (Note: Previously played as Corktown AFC Hawks in 2022)	2024	
Midwest United FC	Aquinas College	Kentwood, Michigan	2016	2017	2021	Joined USL W League
MSC Peoria	Eastside Centre	Pekin, Illinois	2020	2020	2021	
Muskegon Risers SC	Kehren Stadium	Muskegon, Michigan	2014	2020	2022	
Nationals FC	TBD	Rochester, Michigan	2016	2022	2024	
New Jersey Alliance		New Jersey		2025	2025	Joined UPSL
New Jersey Copa FC	Mercer County Community College	Metuchen, New Jersey	2015	2016	2025	Joined USL W League
New Jersey Teamsterz FC	Don Ahern Veterans Stadium	Bayonne, New Jersey	2020	2021	2021	
New York Magic	Mazzella Field	New Rochelle, New York	1997	2016	2024	
New York Surf	Reinhart Field	Bronx, New York	2015	2017	2018	
North Jersey Valkyries	DePaul Catholic High School	Wayne, New Jersey	2009	2016	2016	
North Texas Image	Old Panther Field	Duncanville, Texas	1964	2016	2018	
Olé FC		Connecticut		2025	2025	
Pass FC	Northview High School	Grand Rapids, Michigan	2001	2024	2024	
Players SC	College of the Canyons	Las Vegas, Nevada	1989	2024	2024	
Primero De Mayo		Sacramento, California		2023	2023	
Puerto Rico Pride FC	Lake Brantley High School	Altamonte Springs, Florida	2017	2020	2020	
Queen City United SC	University of Regina Field	Regina, Saskatchewan	1987	2019	2020	
Racing Sacramento		Sacramento, California		2023	2023	
RBFC Elite	TBD	Riverside, Illinois		2022	2023	
Real Salt Lake Women	Ute Field	Salt Lake City, Utah	2008	2016	2018	Folded after Utah Royals FC Reserves formed
Reno Vikings	TBD	Reno, Nevada	2023	2023 (Division One); 2024 (Division Two)	2024	
Rochester Lady Lancers	Marina Auto Stadium	Rochester, New York	2017	2017	2022	
RP Futures		Baltimore, Maryland	2025	2025	2025	
Sacramento United		Sacramento, California		2023	2023	
San Antonio Athenians SC	Warrior Stadium	San Antonio, Texas	2017	2019	2023	Joined USL W League
San Antonio Runners	Cibolo Multi-Event Center	San Antonio, Texas		2022	2023	Joined WPSL
Santa Clarita Blue Heat	College of the Canyons	Santa Clarita, California	2008	2016	2024	Joined USL W League
SASA Impact FC	Riel Recreation Park	St. Albert, Alberta	2021	2021	2022	Joined St. Albert Women’s Soccer League
Scorpions SC	Medway High School	Medway, Massachusetts	2021	2021	2023	
Side FC 92	Case Community RiverCity Parks	Tulsa, Oklahoma	1992	2021	2022	
SoCal Crush FC	Crescenta Valley High School	La Crescenta-Montrose, California	2017	2017	2018	
Sporting CT		Middletown, Connecticut		2023	2024	Joined WPSL
Sporting Nebraska FC	TBD	Papillion, Nebraska	2008	2022	2022	
Springfield Demize	Cooper Sports Complex	Springfield, Missouri	2003	2021	2021	
St. Louis Scott Gallagher	West Community Stadium	St. Louis, Missouri	2020	2021	2022	
Steel United		Bryn Mawr, Pennsylvania	2010	2021 (Division Two); 2024 (Division One)	2025	
Steel United New Jersey	Pingry High School	Basking, New Jersey	2021	2021	2023	
Syracuse Development Academy	Solvay High School	Solvay, New York	2004	2019	2021	
Toledo Villa FC	Northview High School	Rossford, Ohio	2017	2017	2017	
Tudela FC	TBD	Los Angeles, California		2025	2025	
Vikings Gold		Lake Tahoe, California		2023	2023	
Vikings Northstars		Lake Tahoe, California		2023	2023	
West-Mont United Shamrocks		Royersford, Pennsylvania		2023	2023	
Western New York Flash	All-High Stadium	Buffalo, New York	2008	2017	2018	
Williamsport City Lions	Lycoming College	Williamsport, Pennsylvania		2023	2023	
Worcester Fuel FC (Note: Previously played as Worcester Smiles)	Commerce Bank Field at Foley Stadium	Worcester, Massachusetts	2018	2018	2025	

== UWS National Championship ==
Season	Champions	Score	Runner–up
2016	Santa Clarita Blue Heat	2–1 (AET)	New Jersey Copa FC
2017	Grand Rapids FC	3–1 (AET)	Santa Clarita Blue Heat
2018	Houston Aces	1–0 (AET)	Lancaster Inferno FC
2019	LA Galaxy OC	1–0	Calgary Foothills WFC
2020	Season cancelled because of COVID-19 Pandemic; Regional Showcase Tournaments were held.		
2021	Santa Clarita Blue Heat (2)	5–0	Connecticut Fusion
2022	Chicago Mustangs	2-1	Calgary Foothills WFC
2023	Michigan Jaguars FC	0–0 (4–2 PK)	Santa Clarita Blue Heat
2024	Santa Clarita Blue Heat (3)	2–2 (6–5 PK)	New England Mutiny
2025	Edgewater Castle	2–0	New England Mutiny

== See also ==
- Women's sports
- Women's professional sports
- Women's United Soccer Association
