= Calgary Foothills WFC =

Calgary Foothills
- Full name: Calgary Foothills Football Club
- Stadium: Calgary Soccer Centre
- League: Alberta Premier League
- 2025: L1AB: 2nd
- Website: gofoothills.ca
Home colours

Calgary Foothills WFC is a Canadian soccer club based in Calgary, Alberta that currently plays in the Alberta Premier League. The club was founded as a youth club in 1972 and in 2017 as a UWS franchise. The team is the women's team of Calgary Foothills FC.

== History ==
The Calgary Foothills Soccer Club was founded in 1972 as a youth soccer club. In 2014, the club formed a men's semi-pro side to play in the US-based Premier Development League to begin play in 2015.

In 2015, the club formed a women's side, playing a season of exhibition matches in 2015, with the aim to compete in the USL W-League beginning in 2016. However, the W-League unexpectedly folded after the 2015 season, leaving the club without a league to play in. In 2015, they played a series of 7 friendlies, including a 1–0 victory over the W-League West-leading Seattle Sounders Women. The club planned to switch to the UWS for 2016, but those plans were put on hold after the Canadian Soccer Association denied the applications of the Laval Comets and Quebec Dynamo for the 2016 UWS.

The following year in 2017, they did manage to join the UWS, becoming the first Canadian team in the US-based league, after receiving their sanctioning from the CSA, Alberta Soccer Association, and the United States Soccer Federation. The club's inaugural UWS game was played on May 26, 2017, against Real Salt Lake Women, with Foothills suffering a 3–0 defeat. The club finished their inaugural season coming in second place in the West Conference.

In 2018, the Foothills won their first West Conference title, advancing to the league playoffs where they lost in the semi-finals. In 2019, they repeated as West Division Champions, earning a berth in the Final Four tournament for the second year, as well as earning the right to host the tournament at Mount Royal University field. After defeating the Lancaster Inferno in the semifinals, Foothills would lose the 2019 UWS Championship 1–0 to LA Galaxy OC in front of over 1000 fans.

In June 2020, the UWS would announce the cancellation of the 2020 season due to the COVID-19 pandemic and as such, Calgary Foothills would not play that season. They returned to action in 2021, with a match against a new Canadian expansion franchise from Edmonton, SASA Impact FC, in the first all-Canadian UWS match. In the 2022 season they would win all 10 of their regular season games, before eventually losing to Chicago Mustangs in the 2022 UWS Finals.

In 2021, the club became part of a group looking to create a new Canadian pro-am women's league. In 2022, it was announced that the club would be, alongside Vancouver Whitecaps FC, one of eight teams in a new Canadian women's pro-league started by former national team player Diana Matheson. The league will debut in 2025 as the Northern Super League with six teams.

In 2023, they added a second team to play in League1 Alberta, while also continuing to play in United Women's Soccer.

== Supporters' Groups ==
The Foot Soldiers were founded in February 2015 with the intention of bringing a passionate atmosphere to Calgary Foothills FC games.

== Seasons ==
UWS team

Season	League	Division	Record	Rank	Playoffs	Ref
2017	United Women's Soccer	West Conference	4–1–3	2nd (5)	did not qualify	
2018	United Women's Soccer	West Conference	7–2–1	1st (6)	Semi-finals	
2019	United Women's Soccer	West Conference	6–1–1	1st (5)	Finalists	
2020	United Women's Soccer	Season cancelled due to COVID-19 pandemic				
2021	United Women's Soccer	West Conference	2–1–1	2nd (5)	did not qualify	
2022	United Women's Soccer	West Conference	10–0–0	1st (6)	Finalists	
2023	United Women's Soccer	West Conference	5–0–2	2nd (5)	did not qualify	
2024	United Women's Soccer	West Conference	4–0–2	2nd (5)	did not qualify	

League1 Alberta team

Season	League	Teams	Record	Rank	Playoffs	Ref
2023	League1 Alberta Exhibition Series	5	5–0–3	3rd	did not qualify	
2024	League1 Alberta	7	5–1–6	5th	—	
2025	League1 Alberta	8	10–0–3	2nd	—	
