= Rochester Lady Lancers =

- Founded: 2017; 9 years ago
- Ground: Aquinas Institute, Rochester, New York
- Owner: Salvatore "SoccerSam" Fantauzzo
- General Manager: Marc Mandall
- Coach: Salvatore Galvano
- League: United Women's Soccer
- 2022: 2nd, Penn-NY
- Website: https://www.rochesterlancers.com/teams/lady-lancers-uws

Rochester Lady Lancers is an American women's soccer team based in Rochester, New York, founded in 2017. The team plays in the East conference of the United Women's Soccer league, in the second tier of women's soccer in the United States and Canada.

== History ==
The team launched alongside the rebranded men's Rochester Lancers NPSL side in April 2017.

Team owner Salvatore 'SoccerSam' Fantauzzo hired coaches Sal Galvano and Loren Inglese to form the team within 30 days. Playing home games at the Aquinas Institute the team was winless in 2017. For 2018 the team played at Marina Auto Stadium in downtown Rochester, NY. Sal Galvano took over the head coaching duties with his player/assistant coach, Brooke Barbuto. The team finished the season in 3rd place with a record of 5-3-2; Barbuto was named the MVP of the 2018 UWS Season. In 2019 the team returned to Aquinas and fell to 3-5-2. The 2020 UWS season was cancelled due to the pandemic; returning to play in 2021 the team posted a record of 0–12.

== Stadium ==
The Lady Lancers play home matches at Marina Auto Stadium

== Year-by-year ==
Year	League	Record	GF	GA	GD	Regular season	Playoffs
2017	UWS	0–9–1	10	35	-25	7th, East Conference	Did not qualify
2018	UWS	5–3–2	22	18	+4	3rd, East Conference	Did not qualify
2019	UWS	3-5–2	23	20	+3	6th, East Conference	Did not qualify
2021	UWS	0-10	5	34	-29	12th, East Conference	Did not qualify
2022	UWS	7-1-2	23	7	+16	2nd, Penn-NY Division	Did not qualify
Total	5 seasons	15-28-7	83	114	-31		0 Championships
