= Women's soccer in the United States =

Women's association football in the United States

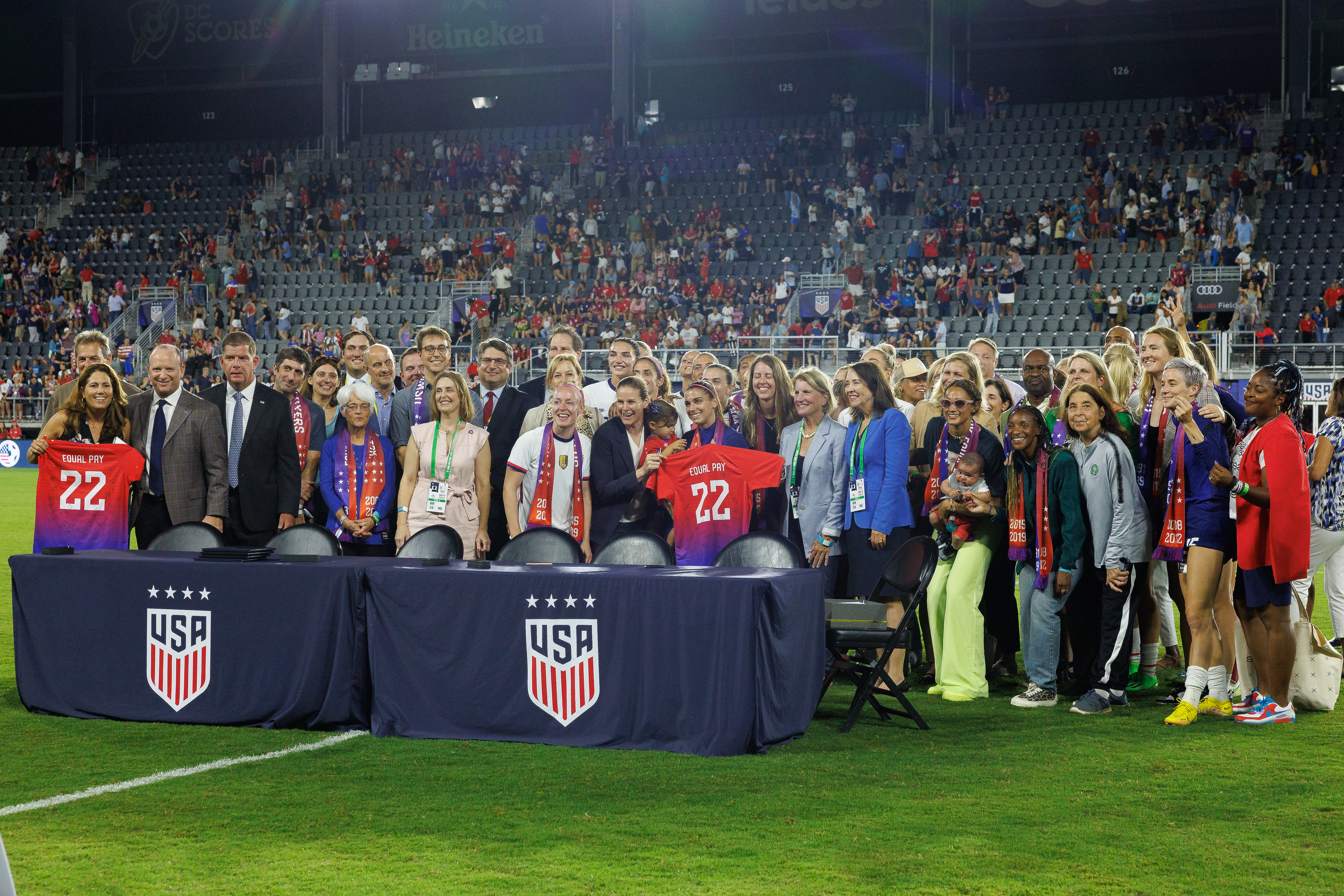
- U.S. Secretary of Labor Marty J. Walsh attends U.S. Soccer Federation, the U.S. Women's National Team Players Association, and the U.S. National Soccer Team Players Association, for a ceremonial collective bargaining agreement signing, post-USWNT match at Audi Field.
- Country: United States
- Governing body: U.S. Soccer
- National team: Women's national team
- Nickname: USWNT
- Clubs: 18 Professional

Club competitions
- National Women's Soccer League; USL Super League; WPSL PRO

International competitions
- Olympics (National Team); FIFA Women's World Cup (National Team); CONCACAF Women's Championship (National Team)

Audience records
- Single match: Club - 35,038 Chicago Red Stars v Bay FC (NWSL) (June 8, 2024); National - 90,185; USWNT v China (1999 Women's World Cup) (July 10, 1999)
- Season: 1,366,581

Women's soccer in the United States has developed quite differently from men's soccer. Until the 1970s, organized women's soccer matches in the U.S. existed only on a limited basis.

Since changes that started in the 1970s, the U.S. has become one of the top countries in the world of women's soccer. In the 2019 FIFA Women's World Cup, there were 58 US-based players, the most of any country and in the 2023 FIFA Women's World Cup, there were 61 US-based players, the second of any country. In addition the national team has been ranked #1 in the world after their back-to-back Women's World Cup victories in 2015 and 2019 and once again after winning the 2024 Olympics.

Until 2024, the highest women's professional soccer league in the United States was the National Women's Soccer League (NWSL), which was established in 2012 as a successor to Women's Professional Soccer and was run by the United States Soccer Federation (USSF) before becoming independently governed in 2020. The league began with eight teams in 2013 and reached its current membership of 14 teams in 2024. Beginning in 2024, the NWSL was joined by the USL Super League as a Division I professional soccer league. USL Super League launched in August 2024 with eight teams playing in a fall to spring schedule. The expansion of professional women's soccer is planned to continue in 2025 with the establishment of WPSL PRO a Division III league, designed to enhance the pathway from amateur to professional.

Amateur soccer has been the backbone of women's soccer in America since the 1950, with the Craig League based in Missouri. The amateur landscape includes both players who compete in NCAA and those who compete in the summer leagues USL W League, Women's Premier Soccer League, and United Women's Soccer.

== Early history ==
One of the first known organized women's soccer league in the United States was the Craig League, which consisted of four teams in St. Louis, Missouri, playing 15-game seasons in 1950 and 1951.

Women's soccer in the United States started to gain popularity in the beginning of the 20th century, much later than it appeared in Europe, which had women's leagues in the 1930s. The passage of Title IX legislation in 1972 made gender equality mandatory in education, including collegiate athletics, which led to more organized women's soccer teams and development. Collegiate soccer created more popularity for the game in the 1980s. However, there were few professional opportunities for women in the United States, and the first national women's league, the USL W-League, would not be established until 1995.

== National team ==
The women's national team was formed in 1983, but would not play its first games until 1985. In its first years, it played in little more than friendly tournaments, primarily against European teams, as few competitions for women's national teams yet existed. After the first FIFA Women's World Cup was announced for 1991 and especially on the United States being awarded the 1994 FIFA World Cup increased investment in both the men's and women's national teams by the USSF led to the United States' team rapidly improving and winning the first women's World Cup. The popularity of the team exploded in the aftermath of the 1999 FIFA Women's World Cup win as a result of penalty kicks in front of a sold-out Rose Bowl. The close win increased the tension, giving the team a more lively reputation as a sport.

Since then, the Americans have remained a force in international women's soccer, having finished third or better in every World Cup, reaching the championship game again in 2011 and winning in 2015 and 2019, as well as appearing in five of the six Olympic gold medal games, winning four. The national team also competes in other tournaments, such as the annual Algarve Cup. The primary source of young players for the national team is NCAA college soccer, which feeds players to the U-20 national team and eventually the full senior team. Because the United States often lacked a professional women's league, interest in the team peaked around major tournaments, and the team historically struggled to maintain interest between tournaments. The United States also faces increasingly competitive European national teams, many of which have well-established women's leagues in their countries from which to draw players.

== League system ==
The success of the women's national team has not always translated into success for women's professional soccer in the United States.

=== History ===
Women's soccer was dated back to the 1800s in Europe. Overcoming adversity and change led to where soccer is today for women.

==== Amateur soccer: W-League and WPSL ====
Originally called the United States Interregional Women's League, the USL W-League was formed in 1995 as the first national women's soccer league, providing a professional outlet for many of the top female soccer players in the country. It also allowed college players the opportunity to play alongside established international players. Starting as the Western Division of the W-League, the Women's Premier Soccer League (WPSL) broke away and formed its own league in 1997 and had its inaugural season in 1998. Both the W-League and the WPSL were considered the premier women's soccer leagues in the United States at the time, but eventually fell to a second-tier level upon the formation of the Women's United Soccer Association in 2000.

==== Women's United Soccer Association (WUSA) ====
A seemingly viable market for the sport became apparent after the United States women's national soccer team won the 1999 FIFA Women's World Cup. Feeding on the momentum of their victory, the twenty national team players, in partnership with John Hendricks of the Discovery Channel, sought out the investors, markets, and players necessary to form the WUSA, an eight-team league, in February 2000. The league played its first season in April 2001, and was the world's first women's soccer league in which all players were paid professionals.

The eight teams included the Atlanta Beat, Boston Breakers, Carolina Courage, New York Power, Philadelphia Charge, San Diego Spirit, San Jose CyberRays (called Bay Area CyberRays for 2001 season), and the Washington Freedom.

Team	Stadium	City	Founded	Joined WUSA	Left	Notes
Atlanta Beat	Herndon Stadium	Atlanta	2001	2001	2003	Dissolved then joined WPS in 2009
Boston Breakers	Nickerson Field	Boston	2000	2001	2003	Dissolved then joined WPS in 2007
Carolina Courage	SAS Stadium	Cary, North Carolina	2001	2001	2003	Dissolved
New York Power	Mitchel Athletic Complex	Uniondale, New York	2000	2001	2003	Dissolved
Philadelphia Charge	Villanova Stadium	Villanova, Pennsylvania	2000	2001	2003	Dissolved
San Diego Spirit	Torero Stadium	San Diego	2001	2001	2003	Dissolved
San Jose CyberRays	Spartan Stadium	San Jose, California	2001	2001	2003	Dissolved
Washington Freedom	Robert F. Kennedy Memorial Stadium	Washington, D.C.	2001	2001	2003	Joined W-League in 2006

The U.S. Soccer Federation approved membership of WUSA as a sanctioned Division I women's professional soccer league on August 18, 2000. WUSA had previously announced plans to begin play in 2001 in eight cities across the country, including: Atlanta, the Bay Area, Boston, New York City, Orlando, Philadelphia, San Diego and Washington, D.C. Led by investor John Hendricks, WUSA had also forged ahead on a cooperation agreement that will see the new league work side by side with Major League Soccer to help maximize the market presence and success of both Division I leagues.

WUSA played for three full seasons and suspended operations on September 15, 2003, shortly after the conclusion of the third season due to financial problems and lack of public interest in the sport.

==== Post-WUSA ====
With the Women's United Soccer Association on hiatus, the Women's Premier Soccer League (WPSL) and the W-League regained their status as the premier women's soccer leagues in the United States, and many former WUSA players joined those teams.

After the folding of WUSA, the WUSA Reorganization Committee was formed in September 2003 that led to the founding of Women's Soccer Initiative, Inc. (WSII), whose stated goal was "promoting and supporting all aspects of women's soccer in the United States", including the founding of a new professional league. Initial plans were to play a scaled-down version of WUSA in 2004. However, these plans fell through and instead, in June 2004, the WUSA held two "WUSA Festivals" in Los Angeles and Blaine, Minnesota, featuring matches between reconstituted WUSA teams in order to maintain the league in the public eye and sustain interest in women's professional soccer. A planned full relaunch in 2005 also fell through. In June 2006, WSII announced the relaunch of the league for the 2008 season.

In December 2006, WSII announced that it reached an agreement with six owner-operators for teams based in Chicago, Dallas, Los Angeles, St. Louis, Washington, D.C., and a then-unnamed city. In September 2007, the launch was pushed back from Spring of 2008 to 2009 to avoid clashing with the 2007 Women's World Cup and the 2008 Summer Olympics and to ensure that all of the teams were fully prepared for long-term operations.

==== Women's Professional Soccer (WPS) ====
Team	Stadium	City	Founded	Joined WPS	Left	Notes
Atlanta Beat	KSU Soccer Stadium	Kennesaw, Georgia	2009	2010	2012	Dissolved
Boston Breakers	Harvard Stadium	Boston	2008	2009	2012	Joined WPSLE in 2012
Chicago Red Stars	Toyota Park	Bridgeview, Illinois	2007	2009	2011	Joined WPSL in 2011
FC Gold Pride	Pioneer Stadium	Hayward, California	2008	2009	2010	Dissolved
Los Angeles Sol	Home Depot Center	Carson, California	2007	2009	2012	Dissolved
magicJack	FAU Soccer Field	Boca Raton, Florida	2001	2009	2012	Dissolved
Philadelphia Independence	Leslie Quick Stadium	Chester, Pennsylvania	2009	2010	2012	Dissolved
Sky Blue FC	Yurcak Field	Piscataway, New Jersey	2008	2009	2012	Joined NWSL in 2013; renamed NJ/NY Gotham FC in 2021; renamed Gotham FC in 2025
Saint Louis Athletica	Anheuser-Busch Soccer Park	Fenton, Missouri	2008	2009	2010	Dissolved
Western New York Flash	Sahlen's Stadium	Rochester, New York	2008	2011	2012	Joined WPSLE in 2012

The new league announced its name and logo on January 17, 2008, and was to have its inaugural season in 2009 with seven teams, including the Washington Freedom of the WUSA. The United States national team players allocated 21 players across the seven teams in September 2008. Also in September, the league held the 2008 WPS International Draft.

Unlike WUSA, the WPS attempted a more local approach and slower growth. In addition, the WPS attempted to have a closer relationship with Major League Soccer in order to cut costs. Most teams considered the first season a moderate success, despite many losing more money than planned. However, most teams began to see problems in 2010. Overall attendance for 2010 was noticeably down from 2009, teams struggled financially, and the WPS changed leadership by the end of the season.

The success of the United States women's national team at the 2011 FIFA Women's World Cup resulted in an upsurge in attendance league-wide as well as interest in new teams for the 2012 season. However, several internal organization struggles, including an ongoing legal battle with magicJack-owner Dan Borislow and a lack of resources invested in the league, led to the suspension of the 2012 season announced in January 2012.

On May 18, 2012, the WPS announced that the league had officially ceased operations after three seasons.

==== WPSL Elite ====
By this time, the WPSL and W-League were the two semi-pro leagues in the United States and had sat under WUSA and the WPS until 2012. Upon the disbandment of the WPS, they once again regained their status as the premier women's soccer leagues in the United States. In response to the suspension – and eventual end – of the WPS, the Women's Premier Soccer League created the Women's Premier Soccer League Elite (WPSL Elite) to support the sport in the United States. For the 2012 season, the league featured former WPS teams with the Boston Breakers, Chicago Red Stars, and Western New York Flash, in addition to many WPSL teams. Six of the eight teams were considered fully professional.

Many members of the USWNT remained unattached for the 2012 season, while others chose to play in the W-League instead of the WPSL Elite.

==== National Women's Soccer League (NWSL) ====
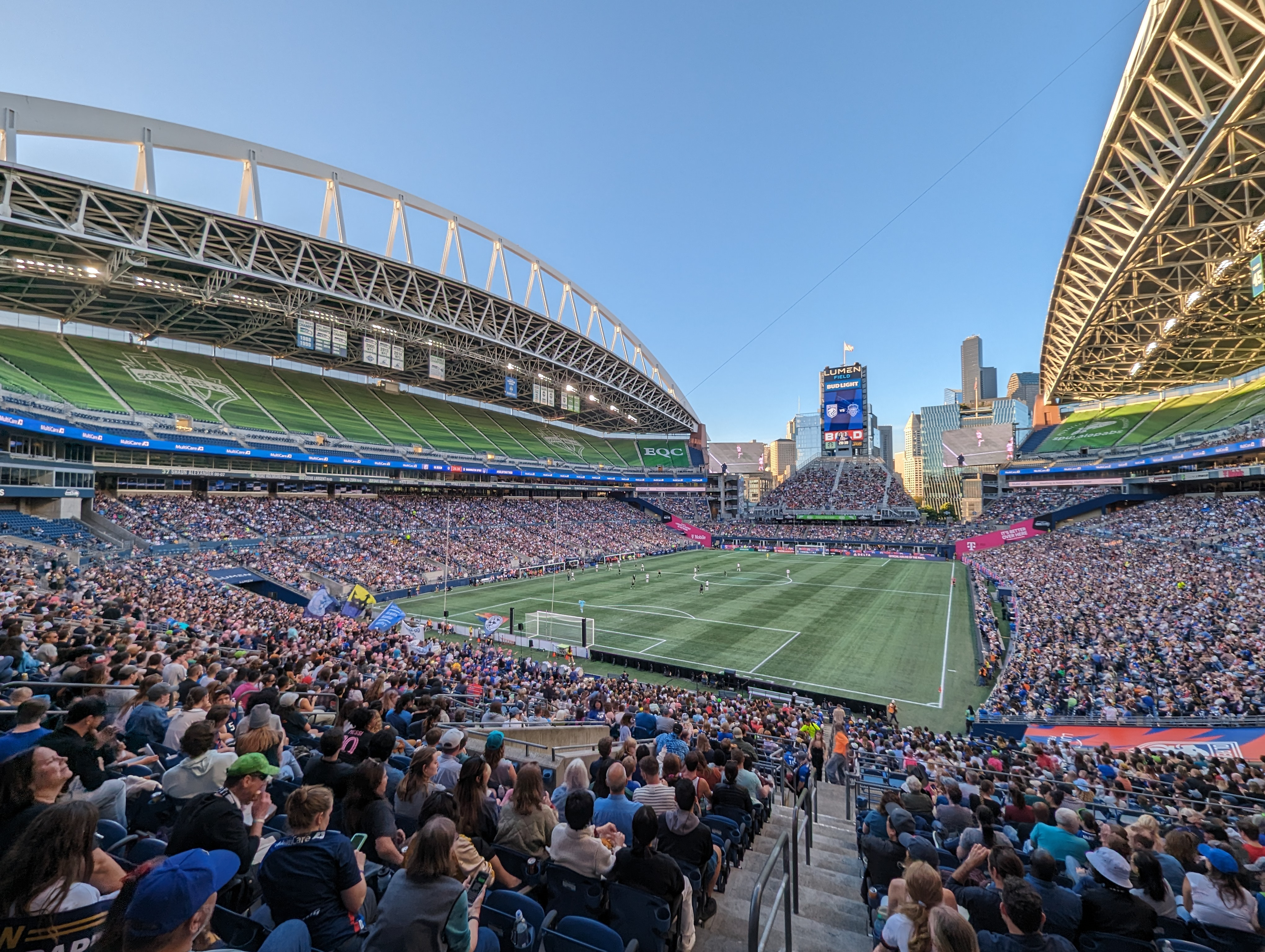
A NWSL regular season match between OL Reign (now Seattle Reign FC) and the Washington Spirit at Lumen Field in Seattle

After the WPS folded in 2012, the U.S. Soccer Federation announced a round-table discussion of the future of women's professional soccer in the United States. The meeting resulted in the planning of a new league set to launch in 2013 with 12 to 16 teams from the WPS, the W-League, and the WPSL. In November 2012, the USSF, Canadian Soccer Association (CSA) and the Mexican Football Federation (FMF) announced that there would be eight teams in a new women's professional soccer league to be funded by the USSF. The USSF would fund up to 24 players, the CSA up to 16, and the FMF a minimum of 12. Four former WPS teams – the Western New York Flash, Boston Breakers, Chicago Red Stars (now known as Chicago Stars FC), and Sky Blue FC (now known as Gotham FC) – were joined by four other teams for the inaugural season in 2012. One of those teams, the Portland Thorns FC, is affiliated with the MLS Portland Timbers and shares its ownership and facilities.

Each NWSL club is allowed a minimum of 18 players on their roster, with a maximum of 20 players allowed at any time during the season. Initially, each team's roster included up to three allocated USWNT players, two Mexico women's national team players, and two Canada women's national team players via NWSL Player Allocation. Mexico no longer allocates players to the NWSL following the 2017 establishment of its own women's professional league, Liga MX Femenil. Each team also has, as of 2016, four spots for international players, though these spots can be traded. The rest of the roster must be filled by players from the United States.

The Houston Dynamo of MLS stated interest in starting a women's team in 2013, and by December 2013 the NWSL approved the new Dynamo-operated team, the Houston Dash, for expansion in 2014. The addition of the Dash made the NWSL the first top-division professional women's soccer league in the United States to have nine teams.

After the United States women's national team winning the 2015 FIFA Women's World Cup, the NWSL announced agreements for its first televised games with Fox Sports 1 during the 2015 season, airing games near the end of the season and during the postseason. The league reached another similar agreement with Fox Sports 1 for the 2016 seasons. The league remained without a season-long broadcast deal, however, and streamed all of its games for free on YouTube.

After the media boom of the 2015 FIFA Women's World Cup, MLS side Orlando City SC showed interest in starting a women's team for the 2016 season. On October 20, 2015, the NWSL and Orlando City SC announced that Orlando would host the Orlando Pride, which started play at the beginning of the 2016 season.

With the beginning of the 2016 season, the NWSL became the first professional women's soccer league to play a fourth season.

The 2016–17 offseason saw the league's first major relocation, with the Western New York Flash selling their NWSL franchise rights to the owner of North Carolina FC, then members of the NASL and now in the USL, who moved the NWSL team to NCFC's base of the Research Triangle of North Carolina and relaunched it as the North Carolina Courage.

Shortly before the start of the 2017 season, the NWSL signed a three-year broadcasting deal with A+E Networks. Under this deal, A+E's Lifetime channel broadcasts 22 regular-season matches as the NWSL Game of the Week at 4 p.m. Eastern Time on Saturday afternoons, as well the league's entire postseason. The deal also saw A+E purchase a 25% stake in the league and receive two seats on the league's board. The remainder of the league's games were intended to be exclusively streamed by go90 in the U.S., but technical issues with that platform led to the NWSL also temporarily streaming these games on its own website.

Soon after the end of that season, FC Kansas City folded. The team was partnered with but not owned by MLS side Sporting Kansas City, and media reports indicated that FCKC was the unintended victim of issues that Sporting was facing with its United Soccer League reserve team, Swope Park Rangers. Kansas City's place in the NWSL was immediately filled by a new franchise to be operated by another MLS club, Real Salt Lake, which was soon unveiled as Utah Royals FC. Shortly thereafter, the Boston Breakers folded, dropping the league to 9 teams for the 2018 season.

The NWSL has since expanded to 16 teams. Utah Royals FC folded after the 2020 season, with its player-related assets being acquired by a new Kansas City ownership group. The new Kansas City side played its first season in 2021 as Kansas City NWSL before adopting its permanent identity of Kansas City Current at the end of that season. Racing Louisville FC also started play in 2021, and the Los Angeles-based Angel City FC and San Diego Wave FC started play in 2022. The Utah Royals returned as an expansion team in 2024, alongside Bay FC. Boston Legacy FC and Denver Summit FC joined the league in 2026, with future expansions in Atlanta and Columbus set for 2028.

Team	Stadium	City	Founded	Joined NWSL
Angel City FC	BMO Stadium	Los Angeles, California	2020	2022
Bay FC	PayPal Park	San Jose, California	2023	2024
Boston Legacy FC	Gilette Stadium (Note: The team played seven games at Centreville Bank Stadium in Pawtucket, Rhode Island in 2026, and will play all home games there for the 2027 season. The team plans to move to the renovated White Stadium in Franklin Park, Boston for the 2028 season.)	Foxborough, Massachusetts	2023	2026
Chicago Stars FC (Note: Known as Chicago Red Stars until 2024.)	Northwestern Martin Stadium (Note: The team played most home games of their first three seasons in the NWSL at the Village of Lisle-Benedictine University Sports Complex. SeatGeek Stadium was the home of the Stars from 2009 to 2010 in the WPSL, and from 2016 to 2025 in the NWSL.)	Bridgeview, Illinois	2007	2013
Denver Summit FC	Centennial Stadium (Note: Due to construction delays, Centennial Stadium did not open until July 18, 2026. The Summit played their home opener at Empower Field at Mile High in Denver, and their next four games at Dick's Sporting Goods Park in Commerce City.)	Centennial, Colorado	2025	2026
Gotham FC (Note: Known as Sky Blue FC from 2013 to 2020 and NJ/NY Gotham from 2021 to 2024.)	Sports Illustrated Stadium (Note: The team played home games at Yurcak Field in Piscataway, New Jersey through the 2019 season before moving permanently to Sports Illustrated Stadium in 2020. Gotham will be moving to Etihad Park in Queens, New York in 2028.)	Harrison, New Jersey	2007	2013
Houston Dash	Shell Energy Stadium	Houston, Texas	2013	2014
Kansas City Current (Note: Played its first season in 2021 under the placeholder name of Kansas City NWSL.)	CPKC Stadium (Note: Plans started in 2021 to build CPKC Stadium, the first stadium built exclusively for women's professional soccer. Kansas City played home matches at Legends Field in 2021 and Children's Mercy Park in 2022–2023 while the stadium was being constructed.)	Kansas City, Kansas	2020	2021
North Carolina Courage	WakeMed Soccer Park	Cary, North Carolina	2017 (Note: Successor to Western New York Flash, founded in 2008.)	2017 (Note: First season as North Carolina Courage; franchise's first NWSL season was 2013 as the Flash.)
Orlando Pride	Inter.co Stadium	Orlando, Florida	2015	2016
Portland Thorns FC	Providence Park	Portland, Oregon	2012	2013
Racing Louisville FC	Lynn Family Stadium	Louisville, Kentucky	2019	2021
San Diego Wave FC	Snapdragon Stadium (Note: Wave FC opened its first season in 2022 at Torero Stadium, also in San Diego, before moving to its permanent home of Snapdragon Stadium near the end of that season.)	San Diego, California	2021	2022
Seattle Reign FC (Note: Originally Seattle Reign FC; rebranded as Reign FC before the 2019 season and was known as OL Reign from 2020 to 2023.)	Lumen Field	Seattle, Washington (Note: Originally based in Seattle, playing home games at Memorial Stadium. Moved to Tacoma in 2019, playing at Cheney Stadium before returning to Seattle in 2022.)	2012	2013
Utah Royals (Note: Known as Utah Royals FC from 2018 to 2020.)	America First Field	Sandy, Utah	2017	2024 (Note: Utah Royals FC initially joined the league in 2018 and played three seasons before ceasing operations at the end of 2020. They returned as an expansion team in 2024.)
Washington Spirit	Audi Field (Note: Originally played home games at the Maryland SoccerPlex in Boyds, Maryland. After having played select home games at Audi Field in 2018 and 2019, the team moved permanently into the facilities of D.C. United in 2020, splitting home games between Audi Field and Segra Field, the latter home to United's reserve side. Since 2023, the Spirit have played all home games at Audi Field.)	Washington, D.C.	2012	2013

==== Folding of the W-League and creation of United Women's Soccer ====
The W-League served as a second-tier development organization and league for women's soccer in the United States for 21 seasons. However, the W-League announced on November 6, 2015, that the league would cease operations ahead of the 2016 season. In response to the folding of the W-League and instability in the WPSL, another second-tier league – United Women's Soccer (UWS) – was founded as a pro-am women's soccer league in the United States. The UWS had 11 teams in two conferences for its 2016 inaugural season, with Real Salt Lake Women, New England Mutiny, Lancaster Inferno, and Houston Aces joining from the WPSL and the Long Island Rough Riders, New York Magic, North Jersey Valkyries, Santa Clarita Blue Heat, Colorado Storm, and Colorado Pride joining from the W-League. The league doubled in size for its 2017 season, adding a Midwest Conference to go with its original East and West Conferences.

Team	Stadium	City	Founded	Joined UWS
East Conference
Lancaster Inferno	Pucillo Field	Millersville, Pennsylvania	2008	2015
Long Island Rough Riders	Cy Donnelly Stadium	South Huntington, New York	2003	2015
New England Mutiny	Harmon Smith Stadium	Agawam, Massachusetts	1999	2015
New Jersey Copa FC	Mercer County Community College	Metuchen, New Jersey	2015	2015
New York Magic	Mazzella Field	New Rochelle, New York	1997	2015
Syracuse Developmental Academy	Ted Grant Field	Syracuse, New York	2012	2017
TSF Academy Valkyries	DePaul Catholic High School	Wayne, New Jersey	2009	2015
Western New York Flash	TBA	Buffalo, New York	2008	2017
Midwest Conference
Detroit Sun FC	Ultimate Soccer Arenas	Pontiac, Michigan	1994	2016
F.C. Indiana	Newton Park	Lakeville, Indiana	2003	2017
Fort Wayne United SC	Hefner Stadium	Fort Wayne, Indiana	2016	2017
Grand Rapids FC	Grandville High School	Grandville, Michigan	2016	2017
Indy Premier SC	Trinity Sports Park	Noblesville, Indiana	2017	2017
Michigan Legends FC	Legacy Center	Brighton, Michigan	2017	2017
Toledo Villa FC	Northview High School	Rossford, Ohio	2017	2017
West Conference
Calgary Foothills WFC	Glenmore Athletic Park	Calgary, Alberta	2015	2017
Colorado Pride	Washburn Field	Colorado Springs, Colorado	1994	2016
Colorado Storm	Sports Authority Field, Adams 12 Five Star Stadium	Parker, Colorado	2014	2016
Houston Aces	Sorrels Field	Houston	2012	2016
Real Salt Lake Women	Ute Field	Salt Lake City	2008	2016
Santa Clarita Blue Heat	Reese Field	Santa Clarita, California	2008	2016
So Cal Crush FC	TBA	Montrose, California	2017	2017

=== Tier system ===
The U.S. Soccer Federation is heavily involved in the creation and operation of the NWSL, but it did not initially refer to the league as a sanctioned Division I league. U.S. Soccer has now officially labeled the NWSL as a Division I professional league, and has added the league to its Professional Council. Unlike men's soccer, the USSF has not specifically designated tiers or levels below the NWSL. However, the Women's Premier Soccer League (WPSL) and United Women's Soccer (UWS) act as an unofficial lower division.

Tier	Leagues/divisions	
Division I	National Women's Soccer League (NWSL) 14 teams	USL Super League 8 teams
Division II	Sanctioned through United States Adult Soccer Association (USASA)	
Division II	Women's Premier Soccer League (WPSL) 100+ clubs (in 15 conferences)	United Women's Soccer (UWS) 25 clubs (in 4 conferences)
Division III	United States Adult Soccer Association (USASA) 55 state associations in 4 regions See List of USASA affiliated leagues for complete list	

== Amateur soccer ==
The United States Adult Soccer Association (USASA) is a national organization and sanctioning body for amateur soccer in the United States. It consists of 55 state organizations as well as regional and national leagues. The USL's Premier Development League and the National Premier Soccer League are USASA-affiliated but are designed to promote a higher lever of competition than the state organizations. USASA also sanctions the Women's Premier Soccer League and United Women's Soccer league.

=== USASA National Women's Open ===
The USASA National Women's Open is an American women's soccer tournament run by USASA. It began in 1996, and from 2009 to 2012 it was known as the Women's Cup. Before the formation of the Women's Open, the Women's Amateur was the top national cup competition.

Historically, it has been contested only by amateur and semi-pro teams, as teams from professional leagues (WUSA, WPS, and the NWSL) are not allowed to enter the competition. However, in 2012, the Chicago Red Stars – then a professional club in the WPSL Elite – entered and won the competition. Similarly, the professional Houston Aces of the WPSL won in 2013.

=== USASA National Women's Amateur ===
The USASA National Women's Amateur is an American women's soccer tournament run by the United States Adult Soccer Association. It began in 1980 and was the top-level national tournament for women's soccer in the United States until the formation of the Women's Open in 1996. It is open to all USASA-affiliated women's teams.

=== US Soccer National Amateur Championships ===
First held in 2014, the US Soccer National Amateur Championships are contested between the league winners of WPSL, Open Cup, and Amateur Cup.

==== Brandi Chastain Cup ====
On March 12, 2025 USASA announced the Brandi Chastain cup which will feature four top Women's amateur teams competing.

== Hardships ==
High operating and travel costs, the lack of TV rights and sponsorship agreements and corresponding lack of funding for salaries and training and development facilities, and the lack of affiliation with profitable men's professional clubs have all hampered the growth of professional women's leagues in the United States. The NWSL, now the longest-lasting professional women's soccer league in the United States, pays salaries as low as $7,200 per year, an amount that falls beneath every government-recognized poverty line in the United States and is less than an equivalent Federal minimum wage job of 40 hours per week. When the NWSL started play, its highest-paid players who lacked a national team affiliation faced a maximum cap of $39,700 and teams were held to a salary cap of $278,000, while some players joined teams under amateur agreements where the players could not be paid even if they took the field or started the game. This was far less than the NWSL's predecessors, such as the WPS, where the average salary of $32,000 was almost double the NWSL's maximum average salary of $16,850. It was also poorly competitive with European leagues, which can readily pay salaries to players of the same talent more than $100,000 per year. This situation has been alleviated to some extent as the league has grown; the team salary cap in the 2022 season was $1.1 million, with minimum player salaries set at $35,000. While the maximum salary is currently $75,000, each team is granted $500,000 in "allocation money" (which can be traded) to supplement the salaries of select players. Also, the cap does not include team-provided healthcare, housing, and transportation allowances, effectively allowing even the lowest-paid players in the league a generally middle-class lifestyle.

The United States women's national team further highlighted pay issues, both in discrepancy with the men's national team and in fiscal hardships of low NWSL pay, in 2015 and 2016. The women's national team filed action with the Equal Employment Opportunity Commission on March 31, 2016, claiming they are paid 1/4 as much as the men's team despite generating more revenue for the U.S. Soccer Federation. The women's team also claimed that they are paid only if they win, and paid less for winning than the men's team is if they were to lose every game. Also, in order for the U.S. women soccer team keep pace financially in order to keep up with the men soccer team was by performing at the world beating level and when it came to the victory tour money the women had to pay extra just to get it. However, in contrast to the men they would just get paid just for showing up. According to the recent four years and recent months in 2016 the women's national team played more games about 40 to 50 percent more than the men and they have 88 wins and the men have 44. Also, the women's team said they are given inferior accommodations, with the men's team being housed in luxury hotels compared to lower-class housing for the women's team. In July 2016 during preparations for the 2016 Summer Olympics, the women's national team sold T-shirts to support a NWSL player trust fund operated by the U.S. Women's National Team Players Association (USWNTPA). Six years of negotiations culminated with the signing of a new collective bargaining agreement with both the women's and men's national teams guaranteeing equal pay and equalized prize money for both teams in September 2022, which team captain and USWNTPA president Becky Sauerbrunn heralded as "a huge win for workers and for labor rights".

Before the 2015 FIFA Women's World Cup, women's national team player Abby Wambach and a group of other players file a complaint in Canadian court about the tournament's artificial turf playing surface. The players argued that the surface was a form of gender-based discrimination since the men's World Cup games are exclusively played on grass. The players' group abandoned the complaint before the tournament. United States women's soccer players have also faced inferior accommodations and facilities to men's soccer at the professional club level. After a 2016 regular season NWSL game between the Seattle Reign and Western New York Flash was played on a baseball field smaller than league regulations considered acceptable, several prominent current and former players called out the league for allowing the game to be played. Former Women's national team goalkeeper Hope Solo, who used to play for the NWSL's Seattle Reign, published a blog post detailing several other examples of failures in hotels, facilities, and equipment while playing for the NWSL.

Another contributing factor is the role of women within American society, which includes relative equality (especially rejecting hardened gender roles) for women in the United States relative to many other countries. This is also reflected in official government policies regarding women in athletics, specifically Title IX, which requires college and public school athletics programs to support men's and women's athletics equally. By contrast, youth athletics in many countries – including most European countries, where soccer development is highly competitive – is focused on sports clubs, not on school-based programs. Thus, outside the United States, laws prohibiting sex discrimination in the educational system could have limited effect on sports programs.

== Contributions to the game ==
America's approach to growing the game among women has served as a model for other countries' development programs for women at all levels. The relative lack of attention — and in some cases, restrictions — afforded the women's game in traditional soccer-playing countries might also have contributed to the United States' early dominance of the international women's game. For example, in England, The Football Association prohibited women's soccer from being played at professional soccer fields from 1921 through 1973. The German Football Association banned women's soccer from 1955 through 1970, and Brazil legally prohibited girls and women from playing soccer from 1941 through 1979.

== See also ==
- Soccer in the United States
