= 2014 National Women's Open =

2014 USASA National Women's Open
Tournament details
- Country: United States
- Teams: 8

Final positions
- Champions: NY Athletic Club
- Runners-up: ASA Chesapeake Charge

Tournament statistics
- Matches played: 13
- Goals scored: 37 (2.85 per match)

The 2014 USASA National Women's Open was the 19th staging of the tournament, and the second under a new format that eliminates regional qualification. The finals included eight WPSL teams and took place from June 26 to 29, with the annual Amateur competitions taking place concurrently.

The defending champions were the Houston Aces who were the second professional team to enter, and win, the competition.

The eight teams participating in the Open Bracket of the 2014 National Women's Championships were the ASA Chesapeake Charge, FC Surge, Fire & Ice SC, Houston Aces, Aces South Select Academy, NY Athletic Club, RSL Women, and Tampa Bay Hellenic, the competition format being a partial round-robin, similar to the previous year. After the round-robin was complete, the top two teams played a final match, with NY Athletic Club edging out WPSL-East rivals the ASA Chesapeake Charge.

With the win, NYAC surpassed FC Indiana as the club with the second-most victories in the competition, and the most wins for any active club (as Ajax America Women folded before the 2014 WPSL season).

== Group play ==
=== Schedule ===
June 26, 2014	Houston Aces	0 – 2	NY Athletic Club	Lake Myrtle Sports Complex - Best Western Field, Auburndale, Florida
8:00pm

June 26, 2014	Tampa Bay Hellenic	1 – 2	ASA Chesapeake Charge	Lake Myrtle Sports Complex - Field 3, Auburndale, Florida
8:00pm

June 26, 2014	RSL Women	4 – 1	FC Surge	Lake Myrtle Sports Complex - Holiday Inn Field, Auburndale, Florida
8:00pm

June 26, 2014	Aces Academy	1 – 1	Fire & Ice SC	Lake Myrtle Sports Complex - Publix Stadium, Auburndale, Florida
8:00pm

June 28, 2014	Aces Academy	0 – 4	ASA Chesapeake Charge	Lake Myrtle Sports Complex - Publix Stadium, Auburndale, Florida
9:00am

June 28, 2014	Fire & Ice SC	2 – 0	FC Surge	Lake Myrtle Sports Complex - Best Western Field, Auburndale, Florida
9:00am

June 28, 2014	Tampa Bay Hellenic	1 – 2	NY Athletic Club	Lake Myrtle Sports Complex - Field 3, Auburndale, Florida
9:00am

June 28, 2014	RSL Women	0 – 3	Houston Aces	Lake Myrtle Sports Complex - Holiday Inn Field, Auburndale, Florida
9:00am

June 28, 2014	RSL Women	0 – 1	NY Athletic Club	Lake Myrtle Sports Complex - Holiday Inn Field, Auburndale, Florida
8:00pm

June 28, 2014	Aces Academy	0 – 3	Tampa Bay Hellenic	Lake Myrtle Sports Complex - Publix Stadium, Auburndale, Florida
8:00pm

June 28, 2014	Fire & Ice SC	1 – 0	Houston Aces	Lake Myrtle Sports Complex - Best Western Field, Auburndale, Florida
8:00pm

June 28, 2014	FC Surge	0 – 5	ASA Chesapeake Charge	Lake Myrtle Sports Complex - Field 3, Auburndale, Florida
8:00pm

=== Standings ===
Team	Pts	W	D	L	GF	GA	GD
ASA Chesapeake Charge	9	3	0	0	11	1	+10
NY Athletic Club	9	3	0	0	5	1	+4
Fire & Ice SC	7	2	1	0	4	1	+3
Tampa Bay Hellenic	3	1	0	2	5	4	+1
Houston Aces	3	1	0	2	3	3	0
RSL Women	3	1	0	2	4	5	-1
Aces South Select Academy	1	0	1	2	1	8	-7
FC Surge	0	0	0	3	1	11	-10

== Final ==
June 29, 2014	NY Athletic Club	2 – 1	ASA Chesapeake Charge	Lake Myrtle Sports Complex - Publix Stadium, Auburndale, Florida
12:00pm	DiMartino 26'; 81'	Report	Barger 68'
