= Turbo D'Feeters =

The Turbo D'Feeters are a USASA women's soccer team based in north Texas that have made repeated appearances in USASA national tournaments. The team also has a youth system participating in the Elite Clubs National League.

== Tournament results ==
=== 2008 ===
The D'Feeters qualified for the 2008 National Women's Amateur through the Region III qualifying competition. They beat the Triad United Aces by a score of 5-1, which they followed with a victory over the Houston Challengers 2-1 the next day. In the national finals tournaments, they beat the Colorado Sporting Fire 3-0 in the semifinals, then won the title by defeating the Chicago Eclipse Select 1-0 in the final.

Team	Pts	W	D	L	GF	GA	GD
Turbo D'Feeters	6	2	0	0	7	2	+5
Triad United Aces	3	1	0	1	5	8	-3
Houston Challengers	0	0	0	2	4	6	-2

Semifinals
Chicago Eclipse Select (OT)	2
NYAC	1
Turbo D'Feeters	3
Colorado Sporting Fire	0

Final
Chicago Eclipse Select	0
Turbo D'Feeters	1

=== 2012 ===
The D'Feeters qualified for the 2012 National Women's Cup through the Region III qualifying competition by beating four other teams in group competitions. In the national finals tournaments, they lost their semifinal match to the ultimate champions Chicago Red Stars by a score of 5-3.

Team	Pts	W	D	L	GF	GA	GD
Turbo D'Feeters	9	3	0	1	12	5	+7
Houston Aces	7	2	1	1	12	3	+9
Houston Challengers	7	2	1	1	7	6	+1
San Antonio FC	5	1	2	1	7	3	+4
Lazers	0	0	0	4	1	22	-21

Semifinals
NYAC	4
Salt Lake United	0
Chicago Red Stars	5
Turbo D'Feeters	3

Final
NYAC	2
Chicago Red Stars	3

=== 2013 ===
The D'Feeters were one of six teams accepted to the 2013 National Women's Amateur. They failed to qualify for the finals after finishing fifth in the group after three games played - a 1-4 loss to eventual winners ASA Chesapeake Charge, a 3-2 victory over the Lady Saints, and a 1-6 loss to eventual runners-up Real Salt Lake Women.

Team	Pts	W	D	L	GF	GA	GD
ASA Chesapeake Charge	7	2	1	0	8	2	+6
Real Salt Lake Women	7	2	1	0	8	2	+6
Olympic Club	4	1	1	1	4	4	0
Lady Saints	3	1	0	2	6	7	-1
Turbo D'Feeters	3	1	0	2	5	12	-7
NYAC	1	0	1	2	2	6	-4
