= 2013 National Women's Amateur =

2013 USASA National Women's Amateur
Tournament details
- Country: United States
- Teams: 6

Final positions
- Champions: ASA Chesapeake Charge
- Runners-up: Real Salt Lake Women

Tournament statistics
- Matches played: 10

The 2013 USASA National Women's Amateur was the 30th staging of the tournament, 14th since the introduction of the Open competition, and the first in five years. Six teams competed in three matches each on June 28 and 29, with a final match on the 30th. The Amateur competition occurred concurrently with the U23 competition, with the Open competition staged the three days before.

== Group play ==
=== Schedule ===
June 28, 2013	Turbo D'Feeters	1–4	ASA Chesapeake Charge	Overland Park Soccer Complex
7:00pm

June 28, 2013	Lady Saints	0–3	Olympic Club	Overland Park Soccer Complex
7:00pm

June 28, 2013	NYAC	0–1	Real Salt Lake Women	Overland Park Soccer Complex
7:00pm

June 29, 2013	Real Salt Lake Women	1–1	ASA Chesapeake Charge	Overland Park Soccer Complex
10:00am

June 29, 2013	NYAC	1–1	Olympic Club	Overland Park Soccer Complex
10:00am

June 29, 2013	Turbo D'Feeters	3–2	Lady Saints	Overland Park Soccer Complex
10:00am

June 29, 2013	Turbo D'Feeters	1–6	Real Salt Lake Women	Overland Park Soccer Complex
4:00pm

June 29, 2013	Lady Saints	4–1	NYAC	Overland Park Soccer Complex
4:00pm

June 29, 2013	ASA Chesapeake Charge	3–0	Olympic Club	Overland Park Soccer Complex
4:00pm

=== Standings ===
Team	Pts	W	D	L	GF	GA	GD
ASA Chesapeake Charge	7	2	1	0	8	2	+6
Real Salt Lake Women	7	2	1	0	8	2	+6
Olympic Club	4	1	1	1	4	4	0
Lady Saints	3	1	0	2	6	7	-1
Turbo D'Feeters	3	1	0	2	5	12	-7
NYAC	1	0	1	2	2	6	-4

== Final ==
30 June 2013
09:00 CDT

ASA Chesapeake Charge	2–0	Real Salt Lake Women

Overland Park Soccer Complex
