= Tatiana Saunders =

English football goalkeeper

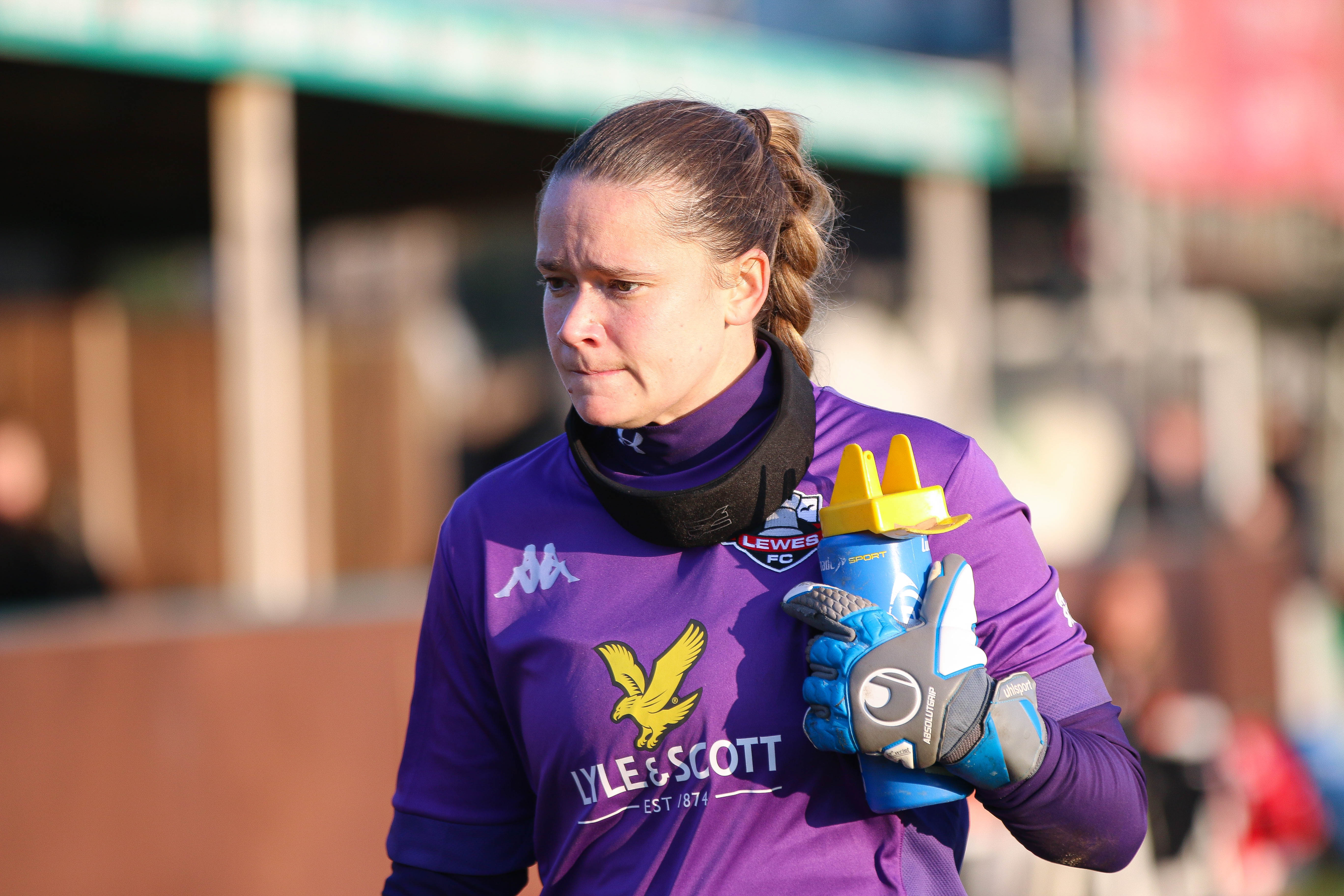
- Playing for Lewes in 2022

Personal information
- Date of birth: 3 July 1993 (age 33)
- Place of birth: Rye, New York, United States
- Height: 1.75 m (5 ft 9 in)
- Position: Goalkeeper

Youth career
- New York Athletic Club

College career
Years	Team	Apps	(Gls)
2011–2014	Dartmouth Big Green	58	(0)

Senior career*
Years	Team	Apps	(Gls)
2018	FH	5	(0)
2018	→ ÍR (loan)	6	(0)
2018–2019	Croix de Savoie	18	(0)
2019–2020	Thonon Evian	13	(0)
2020–2022	Lewes	34	(1)
2022–2025	Durham	32	(0)
2025	Brentford	4	(0)
Total		102	(1)

International career
	England U17		(0)
2010	England U19	6	(0)
- * Club domestic league appearances and goals as of 00:05, 24 September 2022 (UTC)

Tatiana Saunders (born 3 July 1993) is an English former professional footballer who played as a goalkeeper. Saunders played with the New York Athletic Club, where she was part of the squad that won the 2010 USASA Women's Cup, and was named the 2010 Gatorade State Player of the Year for New York. She played internationally for the England under-17s and under-19s with a perfect 6–0–0 record, and was also on the Dartmouth women's soccer team for four years. After a two-year stint working on Wall Street, Saunders resumed her football career in 2018 and has since played in Iceland and France. In 2025 she came out of retirement to play for Brentford Women.

== Life and career ==
By the age of six Saunders was starting to play soccer in Rye, New York. She also played varsity soccer in Rye. She served as captain for her last two years of high school, leading her team to the New York State Class A Championship in 2008 as well as the finals in 2010. During her senior year, Saunders had 16 shutouts, giving up only five goals in 23 games. Her team finished the season 22–1–0, ranking eighth nationally in the ESPN RISE rankings.

At the age of 13 she started playing for New York Athletic Club in the Women's Premier Soccer League. Her squad won the 2010 USASA National Women's Cup, and Saunders was named the 2010 Gatorade State Player of the Year for New York. In 2016 Saunders remained with New York Athletic Club. She was the club's longest-serving player, participating in her eighth season.

Her international football career started as a teen, when she was selected for the England national women's under-17 and under-19 teams. She kept a perfect 6–0–0 record across all appearances. Saunders appeared as goalkeeper for the England U19s during qualifying matches for the 2011 Women's U19 European Championships in Italy, and travelled with the team to countries including Moldova and Macedonia. Her England teammates included Danielle Carter and Nikita Parris.

From 2011 to 2015 Saunders attended Dartmouth College, where she played regularly for the Dartmouth Big Green women's soccer team. Over her college career, she started 57 games as goalkeeper and finished with a career record of 26–24–14. Saunders was an All-Ivy First Team honoree in 2012 and an All-Ivy Second Team honoree in 2014. She was named to the NSCAA All-Region Second Team her sophomore season.

After graduation Saunders worked in finance on Wall Street for two years. She was unable to play professionally due to work commitments, and longed to return to football. When Icelandic team FH women's football contacted her agent looking for a goalkeeper, she agreed to a tryout in January 2018. In February, she signed a contract to play for FH women in the Pepsi League starting in the summer. She played five matches for FH, finishing the season on loan at Reykjavik Athletic Club (ÍR) in the second tier Inkasso League.

For the 2018–2019 season she joined the Croix de Savoie FA (Ambilly Feminin), in France. For the 2019–2020 season, she played for the Thonon Evian Grand Genève F.C. women's team in the Division 2 Féminine. Saunders says her most memorable match was playing against Olympique Lyonnais Féminin in the Women's French Cup in front of 3,000 fans.

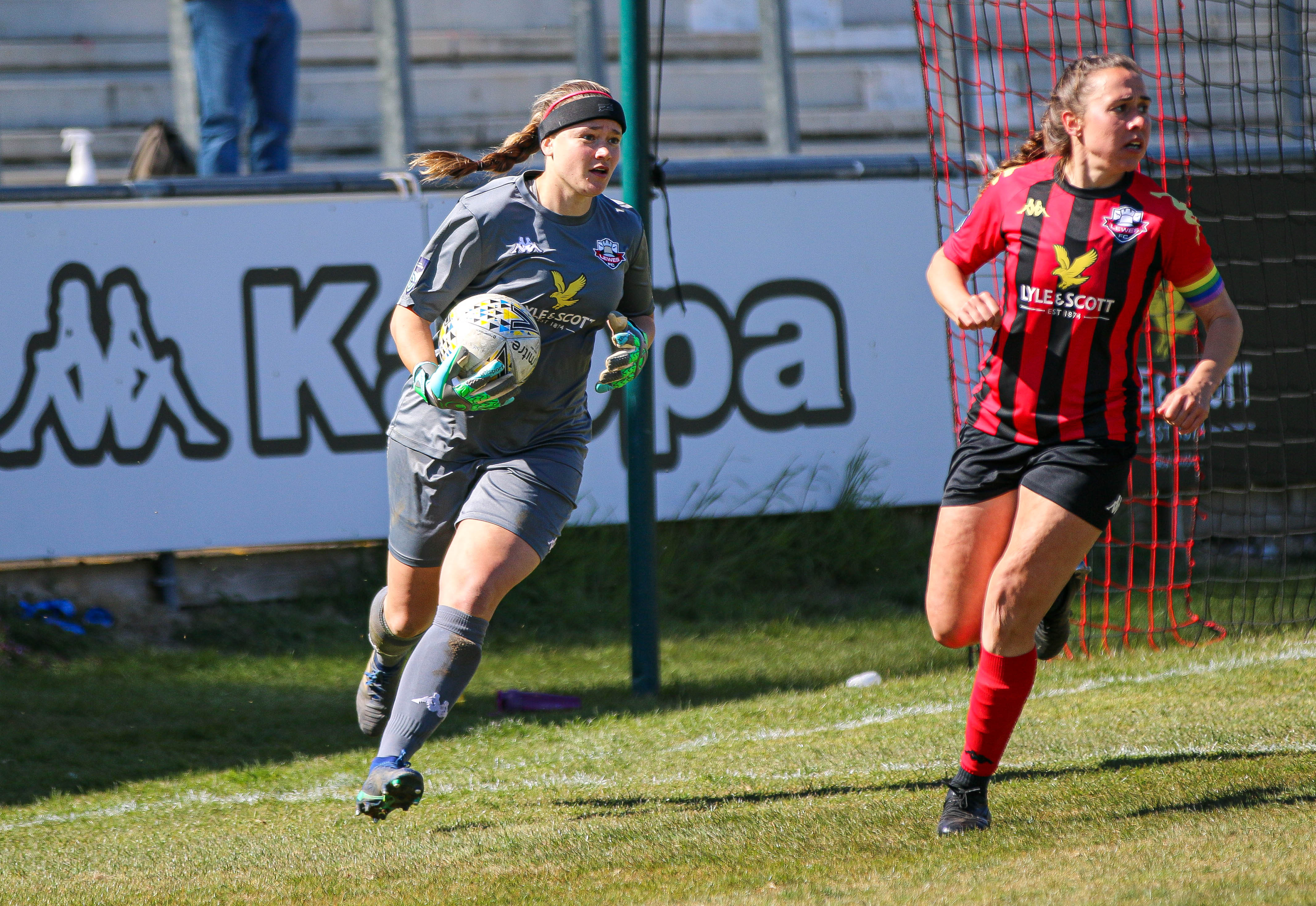
Saunders (left) playing for Lewes in 2021

In 2020, Saunders joined Lewes FC Women, taking the number one shirt as goalkeeper. She was one of eight new players who made up Lewes' squad of 20 players (which included goalkeeper Laura Hartley) under manager Simon Parker. Lewes offers equal pay to its women's and men's teams – the first professional or semi-professional football club in the United Kingdom to do so.

In June 2021 she signed a new deal with Lewes. In 2020, Saunders said that she was pursuing an MBA degree simultaneously with her football career.

During the final match of the season in May 2022 she scored a goal against Liverpool. Her goal kick went over the head of her opposite number goalkeeper, Charlotte Clarke, to give Lewes a 2–1 win. In August 2022 she was playing for Durham. On 26 January 2025 it was announced that Saunders was retiring from professional football, taking up a new role outside of football.
