= Triad United Aces =

The Triad United Aces are a USASA women's soccer team based in North Carolina that have made repeated appearances in USASA national tournaments.

== Tournament results ==
=== 2007 ===
The Aces participated in the 2007 National Women's Amateur and made it all the way to the final, where they ultimately lost to the New York Athletic Club by a score of 2-4.

=== 2008 ===
The Aces failed to qualify for the 2008 National Women's Amateur. In Region III qualifying, the Aces beat the Houston Challengers 4-3 before losing to the Turbo D'Feeters 1-5 the next day. The D'Feeters would go on to win the Amateur title.

Team	Pts	W	D	L	GF	GA	GD
Turbo D'Feeters	6	2	0	0	7	2	+5
Triad United Aces	3	1	0	1	5	8	-3
Houston Challengers	0	0	0	2	4	6	-2

=== 2009 ===
The Aces failed to qualify for the 2009 National Women's Cup. In Region III qualifying, the Aces lost to the Houston Challengers 1-3 before beating Lynch's Irish Pub 3-0 two days later.

Team	Pts	W	D	L	GF	GA	GD
Houston Challengers	6	2	0	0	6	1	+5
Triad United Aces	3	1	0	1	4	3	+1
Lynch's Irish Pub	0	0	0	2	0	6	-6

=== 2010 ===
Region III qualifying for the 2010 National Women's Cup increased from three teams to six, with the other five teams being Dallas Premier, Houston Challengers, AFC Aces, Georgia Cougars, and Louisiana Mudbugs. Play was divided into two groups of three, and once again the Aces finished as runner-up in their group, failing to qualify for the regional final.

=== 2011 ===
Three other teams joined the Aces in attempting to qualify for the 2011 National Women's Cup: the AFC Aces, the Central SC Cobras, and FC Austin. The Aces won their semifinal and then beat the AFC Aces to qualify for the national semifinals of the 2011 Women's Cup. In the semifinals, the Aces lost to Sparta United WSC by a score of 0-3.
