= 2016 Real Salt Lake Women season =

Real Salt Lake Women
2016 season
- Owner: Dell Loy Hansen
- Coach: Mark Davis
- Stadium: Davis High School, East High School
- United Women's Soccer: Conference: 1st
- UWS Playoffs: TBD
| Home colors | Away colors |

The 2016 Real Salt Lake Women season was the team's fifth year of existence in its current incarnation and their first season in United Women's Soccer, the second division of the American soccer pyramid.

== Competitions ==
=== UWS regular season ===
==== Standings ====
===== United Women's Soccer Western Conference table =====
| Pos | Team | Pld | W | D | L | GF | GA | GD | Pts | Qualification |
|---|---|---|---|---|---|---|---|---|---|---|
| 1 | Santa Clarita Blue Heat | 8 | 4 | 3 | 1 | 28 | 13 | +15 | 15 | Championship match |
| 2 | Real Salt Lake Women | 8 | 4 | 2 | 2 | 17 | 9 | +8 | 14 | |
| 3 | Houston Aces | 8 | 4 | 1 | 3 | 13 | 21 | −8 | 13 | |
| 4 | Colorado Pride | 8 | 2 | 2 | 4 | 11 | 18 | −7 | 8 | |
| 5 | Colorado Storm | 8 | 1 | 2 | 5 | 7 | 15 | −8 | 5 | |

Source: UWS West

==== Results summary ====
| Overall | | | | | | | | Home | | | | | | Away | | | | | |
| Pld | Pts | W | L | T | GF | GA | GD | W | L | T | GF | GA | GD | W | L | T | GF | GA | GD |
|---|---|---|---|---|---|---|---|---|---|---|---|---|---|---|---|---|---|---|---|
| 8 | 14 | 4 | 2 | 2 | 17 | 9 | +8 | 1 | 1 | 2 | 7 | 3 | +4 | 3 | 1 | 0 | 10 | 6 | +4 |

Last updated: July 7, 2016
Pld = Matches played; Pts = Points; W = Matches won; T = Matches tied; L = Matches lost; GF = Goals for; GA = Goals against; GD = Goal difference

==== Results by round ====
| Round | 1 | 2 | 3 | 4 | 5 | 6 | 7 | 8 |
|---|---|---|---|---|---|---|---|---|
| Stadium | H | A | H | A | A | A | H | H |
| Result | L | W | D | W | W | L | D | W |
| UWS | 5 | 2 | 3 | 1 | 1 | 1 | 1 | 1 |

Updated to match(es) played on July 7, 2016. Source: uwssoccer.com
A = Away; H = Home; W = Win; D = Draw; L = Loss

==== Match results ====
As of July 07, 2016

| May 28, 2016 1 | Real Salt Lake Women | 0 - 1 | Houston Aces | Kaysville, UT |
| 7:00pm MDT | | Report | Hayward 70' | Stadium: Davis High School Stadium; Attendance: n/a Referee: n/a |

| June 04, 2016 2 | Houston Aces | 1 - 4 | Real Salt Lake Women | Houston, TX |
| 7:00pm CDT | | Report | Vasconcelos 16, 23'; Medeiros 20, 89' | Stadium: Houston Sports Park; Attendance: n/a Referee: n/a |

| June 11, 2016 3 | Real Salt Lake Women | 1 - 1 | Santa Clarita Blue Heat | Kaysville, UT |
| 6:00pm MDT | Phillips pen' (90'+2') | Report | Massey 81' | Stadium: Davis High School Stadium |

| June 17, 2016 4 | Colorado Pride | 2 - 3 | Real Salt Lake Women | Colorado Springs, CO |
| 7:00pm MDT | Long 43'; Rohmer 64' | Report | Vasconcelos 45'; Vanderveur 61'; Norris 82' | Stadium: Colorado College; Attendance: n/a Referee: n/a |

| June 19, 2016 5 | Colorado Storm | 1 - 2 | Real Salt Lake Women | Parker, CO |
| 12:00pm MDT | Stark 33' | Report | Vanderveur 64'; Gale 76' | Stadium: Sports Authority Stadium |

| June 25, 2016 6 | Santa Clarita Blue Heat | 2 - 1 | Real Salt Lake Women | Santa Clarita, CA |
| 6:00pm PDT | Fernandez 20'; Massey 56' | | Rigby 12' | Stadium: The Master's College |

| June 29, 2016 7 | Real Salt Lake Women | 1 - 1 | Colorado Storm | Salt Lake City, UT |
| 6:00pm MDT | Bruner 18' | | 90' | Stadium: East High School |

| July 7, 2016 8 | Real Salt Lake Women | 5 - 0 | Colorado Pride | Salt Lake City, UT |
| 6:00pm MDT | Norris 10'; Bruner 34'; Phillips 60' (pen.); Lyons 64'; Vanderveur 89' | | | Stadium: East High School |

== Club ==
=== Roster ===
As of May 29, 2016.

| No. | Position | Player |
|---|---|---|
| 23 | MF | Alyssa Amano |
| 12 | MF | Bizzy Phillips |
| 13 | DF | Brittany Crump |
| | FW | Max Flom |
| | FW | Kim Gale |
| 5 | DF | Maddy Grainger |
| 10 | MF | Annie Hawkins (C) |
| 8 | FW | Madie Lyons |
| | FW | Elena Medieros |
| 4 | MF | Brecken Mozingo |
| 14 | DF | Baylee Nielsen |
| | FW | Mariah Nogueira |
| 19 | DF | Natalie Norris |
| 0 | GK | Erica Owens |
| 3 | DF | Katie Rigby |
| 24 | DF | Stephanie Ringwood |
| 1 | GK | Rebecca Ritchie |
| 6 | MF | Kira Sharp |
| 22 | FW | Collette Smith |
| 15 | FW | Jessica Vanderveur |
| | FW | Michele Vasconcelos |
| 18 | FW | Jeni Viernes |
| | FW | Dayna Winter-Nolte |
| 9 | MF | Michele Murphy |
