= 2019 United Women's Soccer season =

United Women's Soccer
- Season: 2019
- Champions: LA Galaxy OC
- Matches: 102
- Goals: 386 (3.78 per match)
- Top goalscorer: Kate Howarth (NEM) (18 goals)
- Biggest home win: HOU 6, ELP 0 (June 1); LIR 6, WOR 0 (June 5); ROC 7, WOR 1 (June 23)
- Biggest away win: ELP 0, HOU 8 (May 18)
- Highest scoring: ELP 0, HOU 8 (May 18); ROC 7, WOR 1 (June 23)
- Longest winning run: 8 games Lansing United (May 10 - June 21)
- Longest unbeaten run: 10 games New England Mutiny (Entire Season); Connecticut Fusion (Entire Season)
- Longest losing run: 10 games Worcester Smiles (Entire Season)

The 2019 United Women's Soccer season is the 25th season of pro-am women's soccer in the United States, and the fourth season of the UWS league.

== Changes from 2018 ==
- Syracuse Development Academy joined the league and was placed in the East Conference.
- AFC Ann Arbor joined the league and was placed in the Midwest Conference.
- San Antonio Athenians SC joined the league and was placed in the Southwest Conference.
- Queen City United SC (Regina, Saskatchewan) joined the league and was placed in the West Conference.
- Indy Premier was renamed Indiana Union
- Fort Wayne United FC Gryphons, Genesee FC, HAR FC, New York Surf, North Texas Image, Real Salt Lake Women, SoCal Crush FC and Western New York Flash left the league.

== Standings ==
=== East Conference ===
Pos	Team	Pld	W	L	T	GF	GA	GD	Pts	Qualification
1	New England Mutiny	10	8	0	2	30	7	+23	26	2019 East Conference playoffs
2	Connecticut Fusion	10	8	0	2	27	6	+21	26	2019 East Conference playoffs
3	Lancaster Inferno FC	10	7	3	0	15	12	+3	21	2019 East Conference playoffs
4	Long Island Rough Riders	10	5	5	0	20	17	+3	15	2019 East Conference playoffs
5	Syracuse Development Academy	10	4	4	2	20	16	+4	14	
6	Rochester Lady Lancers	10	3	5	2	23	20	+3	11	
7	New Jersey Copa FC	10	1	9	0	7	20	−13	3	
8	Worcester Smiles	10	0	10	0	2	46	−44	0	

Source: UWS standings
Rules for classification: 1) Head-to-head based on total points; 2) Total wins; 3) Goal difference all league games; 4) Goals scored in league games

=== Midwest Conference ===
Pos	Team	Pld	W	L	T	GF	GA	GD	Pts	Qualification
1	Lansing United	10	8	1	1	24	14	+10	25	2019 Midwest Conference playoffs
2	Indiana Union	10	7	2	1	33	16	+17	22	2019 Midwest Conference playoffs
3	Detroit Sun FC	10	4	6	0	21	22	−1	12	2019 Midwest Conference playoffs
4	Grand Rapids FC	10	3	5	2	23	26	−3	11	2019 Midwest Conference playoffs
5	Michigan Legends FC	10	3	5	2	13	25	−12	11	
6	AFC Ann Arbor	10	2	8	0	14	25	−11	6	

Source: UWS standings
Rules for classification: 1) Head-to-head based on total points; 2) Total wins; 3) Goal difference all league games; 4) Goals scored in league games

=== Southwest Conference ===
Pos	Team	Pld	W	L	T	GF	GA	GD	Pts	Qualification
1	Houston Aces	6	6	0	0	30	3	+27	18	2019 UWS national playoffs
2	FC Austin Elite	6	3	3	0	12	11	+1	9	
3	San Antonio Athenians SC	6	3	3	0	12	16	−4	9	
4	El Paso Surf	6	0	6	0	2	26	−24	0	

Source: UWS standings
Rules for classification: 1) Head-to-head based on total points; 2) Total wins; 3) Goal difference all league games; 4) Goals scored in league games

=== West Conference ===
Pos	Team	Pld	W	L	T	GF	GA	GD	Pts	Qualification
1	Calgary Foothills WFC	8	6	1	1	20	5	+15	19	2019 UWS national playoffs
2	LA Galaxy Orange County	8	5	1	2	16	4	+12	17	2019 UWS national playoffs
3	Santa Clarita Blue Heat	8	5	2	1	14	9	+5	16	
4	Queen City United SC	8	2	6	0	5	18	−13	6	
5	Colorado Pride	8	0	8	0	3	22	−19	0	

Source: UWS standings
Rules for classification: 1) Head-to-head based on total points; 2) Total wins; 3) Goal difference all league games; 4) Goals scored in league games

== Playoffs ==
=== East Conference Playoffs ===
Top two seeds host semifinal games. Highest remaining seed hosts final and the winner will automatically qualify for the UWS national championship.

Semifinals; July 12
**1**	**New England Mutiny**	**3**
4	Long Island Rough Riders	0
2	Connecticut Fusion	1
**3**	**Lancaster Inferno FC**	**2**

Final; July 14
1	New England Mutiny	1
**3**	**Lancaster Inferno FC**	**2**

Bold = winner
* = after extra time, ( ) = penalty shootout score

July 12, 2019
7:00 pm EDT

Connecticut Fusion	1 – 2	Lancaster Inferno FC

Farmington Sports Arena
Farmington, Connecticut
July 12, 2019
7:30 pm EDT

New England Mutiny	3 – 0	Long Island Rough Riders

Lusitano Stadium
Ludlow, Massachusetts

July 14, 2019
4:00 pm EDT

New England Mutiny	1 – 2	Lancaster Inferno FC

Lusitano Stadium
Ludlow, Massachusetts

=== Midwest Conference Playoffs ===
Top two seeds host Semifinal games. Highest remaining seed hosts Final and the winner will automatically qualify for the UWS National Championship.

Semifinals; July 11
1	Lansing United	1
**4**	**Grand Rapids FC**	**3**
**2**	**Indiana Union**	**5**
3	Detroit Sun FC	1

Final; July 14
4	Grand Rapids FC	2
**2**	**Indiana Union**	**3***

Bold = winner
* = after extra time, ( ) = penalty shootout score

July 11, 2019
6:30 pm EDT

Indiana Union	5 – 1	Detroit Sun FC

Grand Park Sports Campus
Westfield, Indiana
July 11, 2019
7:00 pm EDT

Lansing United	1 – 3	Grand Rapids FC

East Lansing Soccer Complex
East Lansing, Michigan

July 14, 2019
4:00 pm EDT

Indiana Union	3 – 2 (a.e.t.)	Grand Rapids FC

Grand Park Sports Campus
Westfield, Indiana

=== National Playoffs ===
Southwest Conference regular season conference champion (Houston) plays in the national quarterfinal against a wild card selection (opponent and date to be announced). Wild card selection to be determined by the league's Competition Committee. Winner of national quarterfinal qualifies for the UWS national championship. The West Conference regular season champion automatically qualifies for the UWS national championship.

Quarterfinal; July 13
**WC**	**LA Galaxy OC**	**4**
SW	Houston Aces	1

Semifinals; July 20
**WC**	**LA Galaxy OC**	**5**
MW	Indiana Union	1
**W**	**Calgary Foothills WFC**	**2**
E	Lancaster Inferno FC	0

Final; July 21
**WC**	**LA Galaxy OC**	**1**
W	Calgary Foothills WFC	0

Bold = winner
* = after extra time, ( ) = penalty shootout score

==== Quarterfinal ====
July 13, 2019
6:00 pm PDT

LA Galaxy Orange County	4 – 1	Houston Aces

Champion Stadium
Irvine, California

==== Semifinals ====
July 20, 2019
2:00 pm MDT

Indiana Union	1 – 5	LA Galaxy OC

Mount Royal University
Calgary, Alberta
July 20, 2019
4:00 pm MDT

Calgary Foothills WFC	2 – 0	Lancaster Inferno FC

Mount Royal University
Calgary, Alberta

==== UWS Championship ====
July 21, 2019
2:00 pm MDT

Calgary Foothills WFC	0 – 1	LA Galaxy OC
	Report	Macario 72'

Mount Royal University
Calgary, Alberta
Attendance: 1,000

Championship MVP: Catarina Macario (LA Galaxy Orange County)

== Statistical leaders ==
=== Top scorers ===
Rank	Player	Nation	Club	Goals
1	Kate Howarth	USA	New England Mutiny	18
2	Samantha Dewey	USA	Indiana Union	11
2	Taylor Wingerden	USA	Rochester Lady Lancers	11
4	Tatiana Ariza	COL	Houston Aces	10
5	Tanya Boychuk	CAN	Calgary Foothills WFC	8
5	Meghan Doyle	USA	Connecticut Fusion	8
5	Lauren Hughes	USA	Houston Aces	8
5	Gabriella Mencotti	USA	Detroit Sun	8
9	Brooke Barbuto	USA	Syracuse DA	7
9	Rachel Sweigard	USA	AFC Ann Arbor	7

== League awards ==
=== Individual awards ===
- Offensive Player of the Year: Kate Howarth (NEM)
- Defensive Player of the Year: Hillary Beall (LAG)
- Coach of the Year: Troye Flannery (CAL)

=== All-League First Team ===
F: Kate Howarth (NEM), Alex Lamontagne (CAL)
M: Tatiana Ariza (HOU), Marti Corby (GRA), Samantha Dewey (IND), Yvonne Northover (CAL), Teresa Rook (LAN)
D: Natalie Jacobs (LAG), Sonia Rada (LAN), Yadira Toraya (SCB)
G: Hillary Beall (LAG)

=== All-League Second Team ===
F: Kaley Buck (LAN), Haley Crawford (LAN), Gabriella Mencotti (DET)
M: Vivien Beil (CON), Jordan Marada (LAG), Alexis Mitchell (LAN)
M/D: Ellie Jean (NEM), Molly McLaughlin (IND)
D/M: Natalia Ariza (HOU)
D: Athena Biondi (LAN)
G: Kelly O'Brien (LAN)

=== All-League Third Team ===
F: Tanya Boychuk (CAL), Taylor Wingerden (ROC), Bri Woodall (SAN)
M: Brooke Barbuto (SYR), Tara McKeown (SCB), Chelsey Patterson (LAG)
D: Shauny Alterisio (NEM), Paige Hayward (HOU), Julia Leonard (IND), Grace Stordy (CAL)
G: Liz-Amanda Brown (AUS)
