= 2018 United Women's Soccer season =

United Women's Soccer
- Season: 2018
- Champions: Houston Aces
- Matches: 130
- Goals: 559 (4.3 per match)
- Top goalscorer: Gisela Arrieta (HOU) (13 goals)
- Biggest home win: GRFC 14, IND 0 (June 30)
- Biggest away win: GEN 0, GRFC 7 (June 1); ELP 1, HOU 8 (June 23); AUS 0, HOU 8 (June 30)
- Highest scoring: GRFC 14, IND 0 (June 30)
- Longest unbeaten run: 10 games Houston Aces (entire season)
- Longest losing run: 8 games Fort Wayne United FC (June 8 - July 8)
- All statistics correct as of July 22, 2018.

The 2018 United Women's Soccer season is the 24th season of pro-am women's soccer in the United States, and the third season of the UWS league.

== Changes from 2017 ==
- Connecticut Fusion and Worcester Smiles joined the league and were placed in the East Conference.
- Lansing United and Genesee FC joined the league and were placed in the Midwest Conference.
- LA Galaxy OC and Colorado Pride joined the league and were placed in the West Conference.
- ASA El Paso, FC Austin Elite, HAR FC, and North Texas Image joined the league and with the Houston Aces were placed in the newly formed Southwest Conference.
- New York Magic, FC Indiana, and Toledo Villa FC left the league.

== Standings ==
=== East Conference ===
Pos	Team	Pld	W	L	T	GF	GA	GD	Pts	Qualification
1	Lancaster Inferno Rush	10	7	3	0	22	10	+12	21	2018 East Conference playoffs
2	Connecticut Fusion	10	6	3	1	26	12	+14	19	2018 East Conference playoffs
3	Long Island Rough Riders	10	5	3	2	27	17	+10	17	
4	Rochester Lady Lancers	10	5	3	2	22	18	+4	17	
5	Western New York Flash	10	5	5	0	23	21	+2	15	
6	New England Mutiny	10	4	4	2	19	17	+2	14	
7	New York Surf	10	4	4	2	19	17	+2	14	
8	New Jersey Copa FC	10	3	6	1	15	19	−4	10	
9	Worcester Smiles	10	1	9	0	7	49	−42	3	

Source: UWS standings
Rules for classification: 1) Head-to-head based on total points; 2) Total wins; 3) Goal difference all league games; 4) Goals scored in league games

=== Midwest Conference ===
Pos	Team	Pld	W	L	T	GF	GA	GD	Pts	Qualification
1	Lansing United	10	7	0	3	32	13	+19	24	2018 Midwest Conference playoffs
2	Grand Rapids FC	10	7	1	2	44	10	+34	23	2018 Midwest Conference playoffs
3	Detroit Sun FC	10	6	2	2	29	11	+18	20	2018 Midwest Conference playoffs
4	Michigan Legends FC	10	5	2	3	27	14	+13	18	2018 Midwest Conference playoffs
5	Indy Premier SC	10	3	7	0	10	40	−30	9	
6	Genesee FC	10	1	8	1	11	30	−19	4	
7	Fort Wayne United FC Gryphons	10	0	9	1	6	41	−35	1	

Source: UWS standings
Rules for classification: 1) Head-to-head based on total points; 2) Total wins; 3) Goal difference all league games; 4) Goals scored in league games

=== Southwest Conference ===
Pos	Team	Pld	W	L	T	GF	GA	GD	Pts	Qualification
1	Houston Aces	8	8	0	0	52	3	+49	24	2018 UWS national playoffs
2	North Texas Image	8	4	4	0	18	14	+4	12	
3	FC Austin Elite	8	4	4	0	20	25	−5	12	
4	HAR FC	8	2	5	1	8	23	−15	7	
5	ASA El Paso	8	1	6	1	10	43	−33	4	

Source: UWS standings
Rules for classification: 1) Head-to-head based on total points; 2) Total wins; 3) Goal difference all league games; 4) Goals scored in league games

=== West Conference ===
Pos	Team	Pld	W	L	T	GF	GA	GD	Pts	Qualification
1	Calgary Foothills WFC	10	7	1	2	22	8	+14	23	2018 UWS national playoffs
2	LA Galaxy Orange County	10	7	2	1	28	10	+18	22	
3	Santa Clarita Blue Heat	10	5	2	3	19	11	+8	18	
4	Real Salt Lake	10	4	5	1	21	20	+1	13	
5	Colorado Pride	10	1	7	2	13	31	−18	5	
6	SoCal Crush	10	1	8	1	9	32	−23	4	

Source: UWS standings
Rules for classification: 1) Head-to-head based on total points; 2) Total wins; 3) Goal difference all league games; 4) Goals scored in league games

== Playoffs ==
=== East Conference Playoffs ===
Final; July 17
**1**	**Lancaster Inferno Rush**	**2**
2	Connecticut Fusion	0

Bold = winner
* = after extra time, ( ) = penalty shootout score

July 17, 2018
7:00 pm EDT

Lancaster Inferno Rush	2 – 0	Connecticut Fusion
Rook 36'; Shuey 67'	Report

Pucillo Field
Millersville, Pennsylvania

=== Midwest Conference Playoffs ===
Hosted by Lansing United in East Lansing, Michigan

Semifinal; July 12
**1**	**Lansing United**	**3**
4	Michigan Legends FC	0
**2**	**Grand Rapids FC**	**2(4)**
3	Detroit Sun FC	2(3)

Final; July 14
1	Lansing United	2
**2**	**Grand Rapids FC**	**4**

Bold = winner
* = after extra time, ( ) = penalty shootout score

July 12, 2018
6:00 pm EDT

Grand Rapids FC	2 – 2 (a.e.t.)	Detroit Sun FC
Paul 11', 75'	Report	Singstock 10'; DeLuca 84'
Penalties
Misiewicz (penalty scored); Labadie (penalty scored); Ashby (penalty scored); Otteson (penalty scored)	4–3	(penalty scored) Wolfe; (penalty scored) Evans; (penalty scored) Deluca; (penalty missed) Bos; (penalty missed) Walker

East Lansing Soccer Complex
East Lansing, Michigan
July 12, 2018
8:30 pm EDT

Lansing United	3 – 0	Michigan Legends FC
Pelafas 1'; Sagara 26'; Costner 76'	Report

East Lansing Soccer Complex
East Lansing, Michigan

July 14, 2018
7:00 pm EDT

Lansing United	2 – 4	Grand Rapids FC
Tanner 47'; Pelafas 90+2'	Report	Maher 43', 49'; Corby 77', 82'

East Lansing Soccer Complex
East Lansing, Michigan

=== National Playoffs ===
Hosted by Grand Rapids FC at Grandville High School in Grandville, Michigan.

Semifinal; July 21
W	Calgary Foothills WFC	1
**SW**	**Houston Aces**	**3**
MW	Grand Rapids FC	3
**E**	**Lancaster Inferno Rush**	**4**

Final; July 22
**SW**	**Houston Aces**	**1***
E	Lancaster Inferno Rush	0

Bold = winner
* = after extra time, ( ) = penalty shootout score

==== Semifinals ====
July 21, 2018
4:30 pm EDT

Calgary Foothills WFC	1 – 3	Houston Aces
Jones 8'	Report	Arrieta 8'; Pallares 45+'; Ariza 64'

Grandville High School
Grandville, Michigan
July 21, 2018
7:30 pm EDT

Grand Rapids FC	3 – 4	Lancaster Inferno Rush
Lay 17', 41'; Otteson 21'	Report	Crawford 19', 23', 55'; McKibben 29'

Grandville High School
Grandville, Michigan

==== UWS Championship ====
July 22, 2018
6:30 pm EDT

Houston Aces	1 – 0 (a.e.t.)	Lancaster Inferno Rush
Gavorski 118'	Report

Grandville High School
Grandville, Michigan

Championship MVP: Julie Gavorski (Houston Aces)

== Statistical leaders ==
=== Top scorers ===
Rank	Player	Nation	Club	Goals
1	Gisela Arrieta	COL	Houston Aces	13
2	Haley Crawford	USA	Lancaster Inferno Rush	10
3	Christina Arteaga	USA	FC Austin Elite	8
3	Brooke Barbuto	USA	Rochester Lady Lancers	8
3	Kate Howarth	USA	New England Mutiny	8
3	Julie Gavorski	USA	Houston Aces	8
3	Tori Sousa	USA	Connecticut Fusion	8
8	Elin Eklund	SWE	Rochester Lady Lancers	7
9	Jennifer Borawski	USA	Michigan Legends FC	6
9	Carissima Cutrona	USA	Western New York Flash	6
9	Cindy Lay	AUS	Grand Rapids FC	6
9	Furtuna Velaj	ALB	New York Surf	6

== League awards ==
=== Individual awards ===
- Player of the Year: Brooke Barbuto (ROC)
- Offensive Player of the Year: Haley Crawford (INF)
- Defensive Player of the Year: Natalie Jacobs (LAG)
- Coach of the Year: Troye Flannery (CAL)

=== All-League First Team ===
F: Gisela Arrieta (HOU), Haley Crawford (INF), Carissima Cutrona (WNY)
M: Brooke Barbuto (ROC), Dani Evans (DET), Jessica Jones (CAL), Tesa McKibben (INF)
D: Natalie Jacobs (LAG), Kylee McIntosh (CON), Olivia Trombley (LAN)
G: Kelly O’Brien (INF)

=== All-League Second Team ===
F: Julie Gavorski (HOU), Kate Howarth (NEM), Tori Sousa (CON)
M: Sabrina Flores (LAG), Grace Labadie (GRA), Teresa Rook (INF), Riko Sagara (LAN)
D: Athena Biondi (LAN), Grace Stordy (CAL), Aubrey Suydam (INF)
G: Stephanie Labbé (CAL)
