= 2013 National Women's Open =

2013 USASA National Women's Open
Tournament details
- Country: United States
- Teams: 4

Final positions
- Champions: Houston Aces
- Runners-up: Kansas City Dynamos

Tournament statistics
- Matches played: 6

The 2013 USASA National Women's Open was the 18th staging of the tournament, and the first under a new format that eliminates regional qualification. The finals included four Midwest teams and took place from June 25 to 27, with the Amateur and U-23 competitions taking place the next three days.

The defending champions are the Chicago Red Stars who were the first professional team to enter, and win, the competition. They did not attempt to defend their title, participating in the inaugural season of the National Women's Soccer League instead. They were members of WPSL Elite during the 2012 edition of the Women's Cup.

The four teams participating in the Open Bracket of the 2013 National Women's Championships were the Des Moines Menace, Kansas City Shock, Houston Aces, and Kansas City Dynamos, the competition format being a round-robin as opposed to the previous used semifinals-to-final. The Houston Aces emerged as champions, winning all three of their matches, with the Kansas City Dynamos as runners-up.

== Schedule ==
[3]

June 25, 2013	Des Moines Menace	1–1	Kansas City Shock	Overland Park Soccer Complex
6:30pm

June 25, 2013	Houston Aces	3–1	Kansas City Dynamos	Overland Park Soccer Complex
6:30pm

June 26, 2013	Kansas City Shock	1–3	Kansas City Dynamos	Overland Park Soccer Complex
6:30pm

June 26, 2013	Des Moines Menace	0–2	Houston Aces	Overland Park Soccer Complex
6:30pm

June 27, 2013	Houston Aces	3–0	Kansas City Shock	Overland Park Soccer Complex
10:00am

June 27, 2013	Kansas City Dynamos	3–1	Des Moines Menace	Overland Park Soccer Complex
10:00am

== Final standings ==
Team	Pts	W	D	L	GF	GA	GD
Houston Aces	9	3	0	0	8	1	+7
Kansas City Dynamos	6	2	0	1	7	5	+2
Des Moines Menace	1	0	1	0	2	6	-4
Kansas City Shock	1	0	1	2	2	7	-5
