= Midwest United FC =

Association football team

Midwest United
- Full name: Midwest United Football Club
- Founded: 1990; 36 years ago
- Stadium: Midwest United FC Soccer Complex; Grand Rapids, Michigan
- Executive Director: Lewis Robinson
- Head Coach: Joe White (Women) and Luke Ruff (Men)
- League: USL W League, USL League Two, MLS NEXT, Elite Clubs National League
- Website: midwestunitedfc.com
Home colours	Away colours

Midwest United FC is an American soccer club based in Grand Rapids, Michigan that fields teams in MLS NEXT and Elite Clubs National League and senior teams in the Great Lakes Division of USL League Two and USL W League. Midwest United FC is a youth academy affiliate of Major League Soccer club Columbus Crew.

== History ==
Midwest United FC was founded in 1990 under the moniker GRASA (Grand Rapids Area Soccer Association) and was the first youth select soccer club in Grand Rapids. The initial registration was 60 players from around the area.

In 1996, Grand Valley Premier SC was formed and was the area's only premier soccer club for the next 10 years. GRASA and Grand Valley Premier merged in 2007 to form Grand Rapids Crew Juniors, the first junior club affiliate of MLS franchise Columbus Crew. During its time as GR Crew Juniors the club earned a National Championship in 2011 for its U17 Boys.

Grand Rapids Crew Juniors rebranded to Midwest United FC in June 2015. The U16 Girls team earned the title of US Soccer Development Academy National Champions in 2016.

In 2019, the ownership of the women's side Grand Rapids FC was transferred to Midwest United FC. Originally competing in United Women's Soccer, the club has since moved to USL W League. A men's team was added in 2022 to compete in USL League Two.

In 2024, the men's team qualified for the USL League Two playoffs for the first time since it joined the league.

== Home Facility ==
The team's current home facility is the Midwest United FC Soccer Complex in Grand Rapids, Michigan.

== Players ==
=== Notable current & former players ===
- Bethany Balcer (2017) now with Seattle Reign FC and called up to the United States national team
- Maddie Pogarch (2017) now with Utah Royals and called up to the United States national U-23 team
- (United States) Maia Pérez (2018–2021) formerly with Angel City FC
- Riley Tanner (2019–2022) now with Washington Spirit and called up to the Panama national team
- (United States) Dylan Sing (2023) now with Crown Legacy FC
- (United States) Brad Dunwell (2024-) formerly with Houston Dynamo FC, Oklahoma City Energy, Detroit City FC, Charlotte Independence

== Head coaches ==
- (England) Joe White (2023–present, USL W League)
- (England) Luke Ruff (2023–present, USL League Two)
- (England) Lewis Robinson (2017, 2020–2022)
- (England) Chris Allen (2018)
- (England) James Gilpin (2018–2019)

== Honors ==
USL League Two

  - Playoffs Qualifiers: 2024

United Women's Soccer

- National championships (1): 2017
- Conference season championships (2)
  - Midwest Conference: 2017
  - Midwest North Conference: 2021
- Conference playoff championships (3)
  - Midwest Conference: 2017, 2018, 2021

Minor competitions

- UWS Stadium Showcase: 2020

== Year-by-year ==
Year	Tier	League	Regular season	Playoffs
2017	2	UWS	1st of 7, Midwest (8–1–1)	UWS champions
2018	2	UWS	2nd of 7, Midwest (7–1–2)	National semifinal
2019	2	UWS	4th of 6, Midwest (3–5–2)	Conference final
2020	2	UWS	Canceled due to COVID-19 pandemic	
2021	2	UWS	1st of 5, Midwest North (9–0–1)	National semifinal
2022	4	USLW	2nd of 8, Great Lakes (7–3–2)	DNQ
2023	4	USLW	4th of 6, Great Lakes (5–5–2)	DNQ
2024	4	USLW	3rd of 7, Great Lakes (7–0–5)	DNQ
2025	4	USLW	4th of 6, Great Lakes (2–4–4)	DNQ
2026	4	USLW	2nd of 5, Great Lakes (4–3–3)	DNQ

== Historic record vs opponents ==
Legend
0–0–0	Win–loss-draw
0–0	Win–loss
*	No games played

Opponent	League	Playoffs	MI Cup	Played	Total	GF	GA	GD	Win %
(Michigan) AFC Ann Arbor	3–2–1	*	*	6	3–2–1	9	11	–2	.583
(Illinois) Chicago KICS	1–0	*	*	1	1–0	3	1	+2	1.000
(Ohio) Cleveland Force SC	1–1	*	*	2	1–1	2	2	0	.500
Connecticut Fusion	*	0–1	*	1	0–1	1	2	–1	.000
(Michigan) Corktown AFC	2–0	0–0–1 (1–0 PKs)	*	3	2–0–1	11	7	+4	.833
(Michigan) Detroit City FC	6–0	*	*	6	6–0	17	6	+11	1.000
(Michigan) Detroit Sun FC	4–2	1–0–1 (1–0 PKs)	*	8	5–2–1	15	11	+4	.688
FC Indiana	2–0	1–0	*	3	3–0	16	1	+15	1.000
(Michigan) Flint City AFC	1–3–1	*	*	5	1–3–1	14	13	+1	.300
(Indiana) Fort Wayne United FC	4–0	*	*	4	4–0	19	1	+18	1.000
(Michigan) Genesee FC	1–0	*	*	1	1–0	7	0	+7	1.000
Indiana Elite FC	1–0	*	*	1	1–0	12	0	+12	1.000
Indiana Union	3–1–1	0–1	*	6	3–2–1	31	14	+17	.583
(Indiana) Indy Eleven	0–1	*	*	1	0–1	0	1	–1	.000
(Michigan) Kalamazoo FC	3–1–1	*	*	5	3–1–1	13	7	+6	.700
(Kentucky) Kings Hammer FC	1–0–1	*	*	2	1–0–1	3	0	+3	.750
(Pennsylvania) Inferno Rush	*	0–1	*	1	0–1	3	4	–1	.000
(Michigan) Lansing United	1–3–2	2–0	*	8	3–3–2	18	15	+3	.500
(New York (state)) Long Island Rough Riders	*	0–0–1 (1–0 PKs)	*	1	0–0–1	2	2	0	.500
Michigan Legends FC	2–0–3	*	*	5	2–0–3	14	7	+7	.700
(Michigan) Motor City FC	*	*	0–1	1	0–1	1	3	–2	.000
(Michigan) Muskegon Risers SC	2–0	*	*	2	2–0	8	2	+6	1.000
(Kentucky) Racing Louisville FC	0–1	*	*	1	0–1	2	3	–1	.000
(California) Santa Clarita Blue Heat	*	1–0	*	1	1–0	3	1	+2	1.000
(Missouri) St. Louis Scott Gallagher SC	*	1–0	*	1	1–0	3	1	+2	1.000
(Ohio) Toledo Villa FC	1–0	*	*	1	1–0	4	0	+4	1.000
Total	39–15–10	6–3–3 (3–0 PKs)	0–1	77	45–19–13	231	114	+117	.700

- Note: Table includes all competitive matches and does not include friendlies.
- Updated to end of 2023 season.
1. ^{B} Indy Premier SC was renamed Indiana Union in 2019.

== Player records ==
=== Goals ===
Rank	Player	Goals	Years
1	(United States) Marti Corby	29	2017–2022
2	(United States) Bethany Balcer	19	2017
2	(United States) Stephanie Currie	19	2019–
4	(United States) Avery Lockwood	12	2017, 2020–2022
5	(United States) Jen Blitchok	11	2019–
6	(Australia) Cindy Lay	9	2018
7	(Japan) Riko Sagara	7	2017, 2019
7	(United States) Grace Labadie	7	2017–2021
7	(United States) Elle Otto	7	2021–
10	(Jamaica) Jordian Morris	6	2018
10	(United States) Kendra Longoria	6	2018–2020
10	(United States) Anna Bennett	6	2021–

=== Appearances ===
Rank	Player	Apps	Years
1	(United States) Marti Corby	54	2017–2022
2	(United States) Grace Labadie	36	2017–2021
3	(United States) Stephanie Currie	35	2019–
4	(United States) Clare Carlson	33	2017–2019, 2021
4	(United States) Macey Wierenga	33	2020–
6	(United States) Sadie Misiewicz	32	2017–2020
7	(United States) Avery Lockwood	31	2017, 2020–2022
7	(United States) Jen Blitchok	31	2019–
9	(England) Paige Eli	29	2017–2022
10	(United States) Olivia Albert	28	2019, 2021–

- Note: Table includes all competitive matches and does not include friendlies.
- Updated to end of 2023 season
