= 2009 National Women's Cup =

2009 USASA National Women's Cup
Tournament details
- Country: United States

Final positions
- Champions: Chicago Eclipse Select
- Runners-up: New York Athletic Club

The 2009 USASA National Women's Cup was the 14th edition of the annual national soccer championship, won by the Chicago Eclipse Select with a 3-1 victory over the New York Athletic Club. The Eclipse beat NYAC in the semifinals of the 2008 Women's Amateur the previous year as well before losing to the Turbo D'Feeters in the Amateur final.

== Regional Phase ==
=== Region I ===
NYAC beat Danubia in the final, with the Classic Crush (of Massachusetts) and the Peninsula Aztecs as the losing semifinalists.

=== Region II ===
Six teams were divided into two groups, with the group winners facing off for Region II's national semifinal slot. The Chicago Eclipse Select won their group and then beat the Kentucky Wanderers to move forward. The group runners-up were J.B. Marine S.C. and Women's SC United, followed by FC Indiana and the AAFC Elite.

=== Region III ===
The Houston Challengers won a three-team group, with runners-up Triad United Aces and third-place Lynch's Irish Pub.

== National Finals ==
Semifinals
Chicago Eclipse Select
Phoenix Inferno
NYAC
Houston Challengers

Final
Chicago Eclipse Select	3
NYAC	1

=== Semi-finals ===
24 July 2012
9:30 EDT

Chicago Eclipse Select	v	Phoenix Inferno

Sylvan Lake Park Field C, Sanford, Florida

24 July 2012
9:30 EDT

New York Athletic Club	v	Houston Challengers

Sylvan Lake Park Field D, Sanford, Florida

=== Final ===
26 July 2012
10:30 EDT

Chicago Eclipse Select	3 - 1	NYAC

Sylvan Lake Park Field C, Sanford, Florida
