= 2011 National Women's Cup =

2011 USASA National Women's Cup
Tournament details
- Country: United States

Final positions
- Champions: J.B. Marine S.C.
- Runners-up: Sparta United WSC

The 2011 USASA National Women's Cup was the 16th edition of the annual national soccer championship, won by the St. Louis powerhouse J.B. Marine S.C. in an overtime 2-1 victory over Sparta United WSC of Salt Lake City. This was J.B. Marine's sixth title over all competitions.

== Regional Phase ==
=== Region I ===
Regional Quarterfinal
Vereinigung Erzgebirge	3
ASA Chesapeake Charge	6

Regional semifinals
ASA Chesapeake Charge	2
New York Athletic Club	1
PA West United	0
Peninsula Aztecs	1

Regional final
Peninsula Aztecs	0
ASA Chesapeake Charge	1

=== Region II ===
J.B. Marine S.C. qualified by winning a four-team playoff series after finishing fourth in group play after St. Louis Scott Gallagher, the Croatian Eagles, and the Kansas Dynahawks.

=== Region III ===
The Triad United Aces beat the AFC Aces in the final of the Region III playoffs; losing semifinalists were the Central SC Cobras and FC Austin.

== National Finals ==
Semifinals
ASA Chesapeake Charge	0
J.B. Marine S.C.	2
Triad United Aces	0
Sparta United WSC	3

Final
J.B. Marine S.C.	2
Sparta United WSC	1

=== Semi-finals ===
15 July 2012

ASA Chesapeake Charge	0 - 2	J.B. Marine S.C.
		1st half

Lovers Lane Soccer Complex, Bowling Green, Kentucky

15 July 2012

Triad United Aces	0 - 3	Sparta United WSC
		12'; 72'; 76'

Lovers Lane Soccer Complex, Bowling Green, Kentucky

=== Final ===
17 July 2011

J.B. Marine S.C.	2 - 1 (OT)	Sparta United WSC
69' Jaskowiak; 103' Crabtree		18' Nicolaides

Lovers Lane Soccer Complex, Bowling Green, Kentucky
