= Pensacola FC (women) =

Pensacola FC Women
- Full name: Pensacola Football Club Women
- Founded: 2011
- Stadium: Ashton Brosnaham Stadium; Pensacola, FL
- Capacity: 2,500
- Owner: Justin Witkin
- Head Coach: Jason Providence
- League: Gulf Coast Premier League

The Pensacola FC Women are an American soccer team based in Pensacola, Florida. Founded in 2011 as the Gulf Coast Texans, they play in the Gulf Coast Premier League.

== History ==
The team was founded as Gulf Coast Texans in 2011. The team captured the 2012 WPSL title defeating Boston Aztec 4–0 in the final. The team reached the WPSL Final again in 2017, but fell short losing to Fire & Ice SC. In 2018 the first year playing as Pensacola FC, the team made the final again but this time losing to Seattle Sounders ladies 3–1 in 2018. In 2019 however playing against a star-studded Utah Royals Reserve team, PFC were crowned Champions by a margin of 4–3 in the finals under the Helm of longstanding Head Coach David Kemp and assistants Jason Providence and Dean Logan. David Kemp was voted the coach of the year. In 2021 Pensacola FC moved to the UWS women's league in the Southeast Division where they were the league and conference champions. Head Coach Jason Providence was voted the Coach of the Year together with Emily Madril (FSU) being the defensive player of the year and Monigo Karnely (Mississippi State) being voted the offensive player of the year in the conference.

They are affiliated with the men's soccer team Pensacola FC.

== Year-by-year ==
Year	Division	League	Reg. season	Playoffs
Gulf Coast Texans
2011	4	WPSL	3rd, Sunshine	did not qualify
2012	4	WPSL	1st, Sunshine	Champions
2013	4	WPSL	1st, Sunshine	Semifinals
2014	4	USL-W	1st, Southeastern	Southern Confernece Playoffs
2015	Youth team			
2016	4	WPSL	3rd, Southeast	–
2017	4	WPSL	1st, Southeastern	Finals
Pensecola FC
2018	4	WPSL	1st, Gulf	Finals
2019	4	WPSL	1st, Gulf	Champions
2020	COVID-19			
2022	4	UWS	4th, Southeast	did not participate
2023	5	GCPL	1st, Third Coast	Finals
2024	5	GCPL	1st, West	Finals
2025	5	WPSL	1st, Third Coast	Conference Playoffs

== Stadium ==
- Ashton Brosnaham Stadium; Pensacola, FL (2013–present)
