= Méabh De Búrca =

Irish footballer

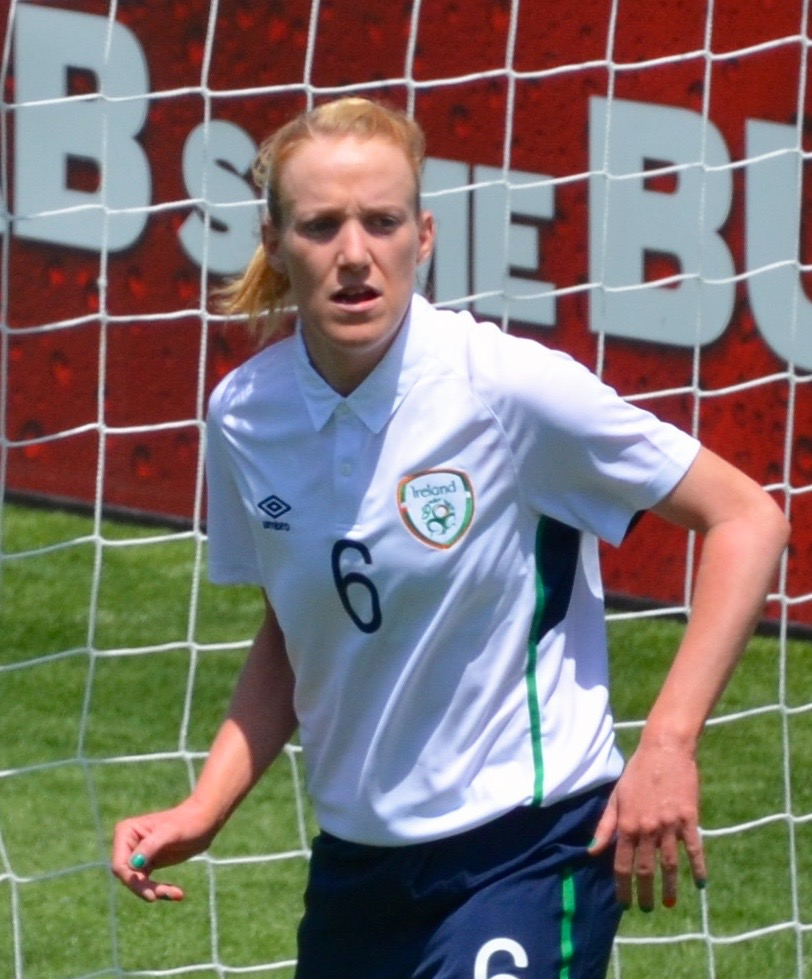
- De Búrca playing for Ireland in 2015

Personal information
- Full name: Méabh De Búrca
- Date of birth: 11 August 1988 (age 38)
- Place of birth: Galway, Ireland
- Height: 1.63 m (5 ft 4 in)
- Positions: Defender; midfielder

Team information
- Current team: Galway
- Number: 5

Youth career
- Salthill Devon

Senior career*
Years	Team	Apps	(Gls)
2000–2009	Salthill Devon		
2007–2009	→ Galway		
2009–2011	New Haven Chargers		
2011	Boston Aztec	13	(0)
2012	Amazon Grimstad	18	(1)
2013	Eskilstuna United	26	(0)
2013–2017	Galway		

International career
2006–2017	Republic of Ireland	52	(0)
- * Club domestic league appearances and goals

Méabh De Búrca (born 11 August 1988) is an Irish former footballer who plays for the Republic of Ireland women's national football team and Women's National League club Galway. At club level she previously played in America for Boston Aztec, in Norway for Amazon Grimstad and for Swedish club Eskilstuna United. De Búrca can play in defence or midfield.

== Club career ==
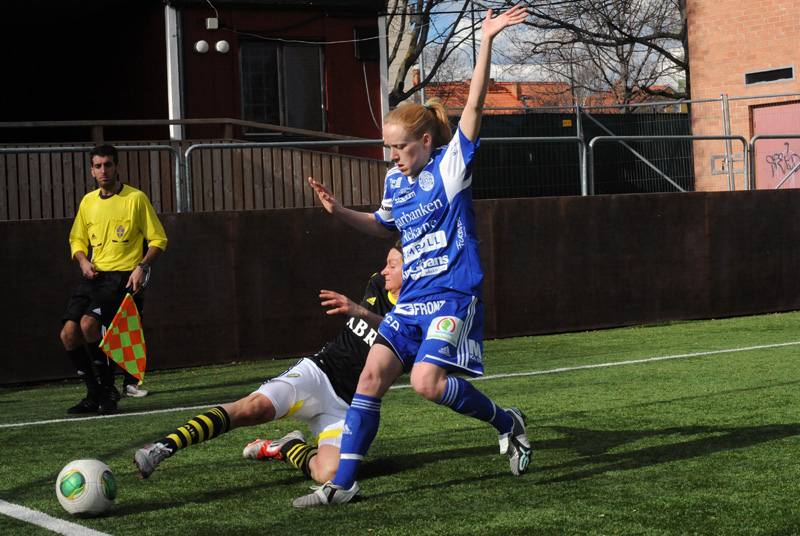

De Búrca joined Salthill Devon in 2000, initially playing in the boys' team. She progressed through the ranks alongside Niamh Fahey, and the pair helped Galway win the 2007 FAI Women's Cup final. While Fahey departed to Arsenal Ladies, De Búrca stayed in Ireland and represented Galway in the 2008–09 UEFA Women's Cup.

In 2009 De Búrca moved to the University of New Haven on a soccer scholarship. In the 2011 season she also played for Boston Aztec, the Boston Breakers' reserve team, who compete at WPSL level. De Búrca made 13 appearances as Aztec won their conference and reached the national semi–final.

After graduating with a Master's degree in Sports Management, De Búrca signed a professional contract to play the 2012 season with Norwegian club Amazon Grimstad.

De Búrca spent the 2013 season playing for Eskilstuna United alongside compatriot Louise Quinn. The team won the Elitettan and promotion into the Damallsvenskan. In December 2013 De Búrca signed for new Women's National League entrant Galway W.F.C.

== International career ==
De Búrca has won over 50 caps for Ireland, having previously represented her country at Under–17 level and as captain of the Under–19 team. Her full international debut came in a 1–0 defeat to Italy at Richmond Park in September 2006.

In 2007, while a student at NUI Galway, De Búrca played for Irish Universities at the 2007 Summer Universiade in Bangkok.
