= 2012 National Women's Cup =

2012 USASA National Women's Cup
Tournament details
- Country: United States

Final positions
- Champions: Chicago Red Stars
- Runners-up: New York Athletic Club

The 2012 USASA National Women's Cup was the 17th edition of the annual national soccer championship. The Chicago Red Stars won in their inaugural Cup campaign, beating the New York Athletic Club (NYAC) with just half of their official squad, the other half playing in the final regular-season WPSL Elite game.

== Regional Phase ==
=== Region I ===
Round 1 (April 22)
Pittsburgh United	7
Maryland Capitols FC	0

Round 2 (May 17)
Battle Row	8
Pittsburgh United	1
Rochester Lazers	4
Philadelphia United German-Hungarians	0

To regional semifinals
Battle Row
Rochester Lazers

Regional semifinals (June 7)
Battle Row	1
Rochester Lazers	0
NYAC	4
Peninsula Aztecs	0

Regional final (June 17)
Battle Row	0
NYAC	5

=== Region II ===
Team	Pts	W	D	L	GF	GA	GD
Chicago Red Stars	10	3	1	0	7	0	+7
J.B. Marine S.C.	8	2	2	0	9	3	+6
Croatian Eagles	7	2	1	1	8	5	+3
KC United Metro	1	0	1	3	3	10	-7
Fort Wayne SC	1	0	1	3	3	12	-9

June 15, 2012	Chicago Red Stars	2 - 0	Croatian Eagles	Fort Wayne, Indiana
3:30pm				Stadium: Field 6

June 15, 2012	Fort Wayne SC	2 - 2	KC United Metro	Fort Wayne, Indiana
3:30pm				Stadium: Field 7

June 16, 2012	KC United Metro	0 - 3	Chicago Red Stars	Fort Wayne, Indiana
8:30am				Stadium: Field 2

June 16, 2012	J.B. Marine S.C.	2 - 2	Croatian Eagles	Fort Wayne, Indiana
8:30am				Stadium: Field 3

June 16, 2012	Chicago Red Stars	2 - 0	Fort Wayne SC	Fort Wayne, Indiana
12:30pm				Stadium: Field 2

June 16, 2012	Fort Wayne SC	0 - 5	J.B. Marine S.C.	Fort Wayne, Indiana
3:30pm				Stadium: Field 2

June 16, 2012	Croatian Eagles	3 - 0	KC United Metro	Fort Wayne, Indiana
3:30pm				Stadium: Field 3

June 17, 2012	KC United Metro	1 - 2	J.B. Marine S.C.	Fort Wayne, Indiana
8:00am				Stadium: Field 2

June 17, 2012	Croatian Eagles	3 - 1	Fort Wayne SC	Fort Wayne, Indiana
8:00am				Stadium: Field 5

June 17, 2012	J.B. Marine S.C.	0 - 0	Chicago Red Stars	Fort Wayne, Indiana
12:00pm				Stadium: Field 2

=== Region III ===
Team	Pts	W	D	L	GF	GA	GD
Turbo D'Feeters	9	3	0	1	12	5	+7
Houston Aces	7	2	1	1	12	3	+9
Houston Challengers	7	2	1	1	7	6	+1
San Antonio FC	5	1	2	1	7	3	+4
Lazers	0	0	0	4	1	22	-21

== National Finals ==
Semifinals
NYAC	4
Salt Lake United	0
Chicago Red Stars	5
Turbo D'Feeters	3

Final
NYAC	2
Chicago Red Stars	3

=== Semi-finals ===
20 July 2012
10:30 CDT

NYAC	4 - 0	Salt Lake United

Argo High School, Bridgeview, Illinois

20 July 2012
10:30 CDT

Chicago Red Stars	5 - 3	Turbo D'Feeters
45+' 75' Cinalli; 48' Hough; 56' Sebo; 62' Laxgang		8'; 32'; 64?'

Toyota Park Turf field, Bridgeview, Illinois

=== Final ===
22 July 2012
12:00 CDT

NYAC	2 - 3	Chicago Red Stars
5'; 64'		38' Cinalli; 56' Elliott; 66' Waddle

Toyota Park main field, Bridgeview, Illinois
