= 2010 National Women's Cup =

2010 USASA National Women's Cup
Tournament details
- Country: United States

The 2010 USASA National Women's Cup was the 15th edition of the annual national soccer championship, won by the previous season's runners-up New York Athletic Club (NYAC). They beat Dallas Premier 2-0 in overtime in the final.

== Regional Phase ==
=== Region I ===
NYAC beat Danubia in the final, with Vereinigung Erzebirge and the Peninsula Aztecs as the losing semifinalists. Quarterfinalists included PA West United, the Philadelphia United German-Hungarians, and the Partizan Richmond Ladies.

=== Region II ===
Region II was decided by a five-team round-robin, with the Kentucky Wanderers edging out both J.B. Marine S.C. and the Croatian Eagles on a goal-differential tiebreaker. The other two teams involved were Vardar East (from Michigan) and Move Makers (Illinois).

=== Region III ===
Six teams were divided into two groups, with the group winners facing off for Region III's national semifinal slot. The Dallas Premier won their group and then beat the Houston Challengers to move forward. The group runners-up were the Triad United Aces and the AFC Aces, followed by the Georgia Cougars and the Louisiana Mudbugs

== National Finals ==
Games played at the United German-Hungarian Club in Oakford, Pennsylvania.

Semifinals (30 July)
NYAC
BYE (no Region IV participant)
Dallas Premier
Kentucky Wanderers

Final (1 Aug)
NYAC (OT)	2
Dallas Premier	0
