= 2012 WPSL season =

Women's Premier Soccer League
- Season: 2012
- Champions: Gulf Coast Texans

The 2012 Women's Premier Soccer League season is the 15th season of the WPSL. The 2012 season saw the formation of two new leagues within the WPSL structure: the WPSL Elite League and a U-20 League.

== Changes from 2011 ==
=== Name changes ===
Team name	Location	Previous name
Aztec MA	Boston, MA	Boston Aztec

=== New franchises ===
Team name	Metro area	Location	Previous affiliation
Empire United	Western New York		expansion
Eugene Metro Football Club		Eugene, Oregon	expansion
FC Austin	Greater Austin	Cedar Park, Texas	expansion
Issaquah SC	Seattle area	Issaquah, Washington	expansion
Knoxville Lady Force	Knoxville area	Knoxville, Tennessee	expansion
Maryland Capitols FC	DC area	Landover, Maryland	expansion
Tidewater Sharks	Hampton Roads	Williamsburg, Virginia	expansion
United FC Binghamton	Greater Binghamton	Binghamton, New York	expansion
New Jersey		Atlantic City, New Jersey	expansion

Note: A place for a St. Louis team was created on the WPSL website in early 2012 and remains there, but the team was not part of the 2012 season.

=== Folding/moving ===
- To WPSL Elite League:
  - ASA Chesapeake Charge
  - Chicago Red Stars
  - FC Indiana
  - New England Mutiny
  - New York Fury
- Folded:
  - Chelsea Metro
  - Orange County Waves

== Standings ==
Blue indicates division title
Yellow indicates qualified for playoffs

=== Big Sky Conference ===
==== North Division ====
Place	Team	P	W	L	T	GF	GA	GD	Points
1	Salt Lake City Sparta	8	6	0	2	36	7	+29	20
2	Utah Starzz	8	5	2	1	22	10	+12	16
3	Phoenix U23	6	2	2	2	11	6	+5	8
4	Phoenix Del Sol	6	2	3	1	15	17	-2	7
5	FC St. George	8	0	8	0	2	46	-44	0

==== South Division ====
Place	Team	P	W	L	T	GF	GA	GD	Points
1	FC Dallas	13	12	1	0	61	9	+52	36
2	Oklahoma Alliance	12	9	1	2	37	12	+15	29
3	American Eagles Soccer Club	12	8	2	2	25	13	+12	26
4	Tulsa Spirit	13	7	5	1	4	1	+3	22
5	Houston South Select	12	6	5	1	21	19	+2	19
6	Texas Football Club	12	4	7	1	8	2	+6	13
7	Houston Aces	12	3	7	2	18	27	-9	11
8	Fort Worth Panthers	12	3	8	1	24	26	-2	10
8	Arkansas Comets	10	2	8	0	11	42	-31	6
9	FC Austin	12	1	9	2	5	34	-29	5
9	West Texas Pride FC	2	0	2	0	1	19	-18	0

=== Northeast Atlantic Conference ===
==== North Division ====
Place	Team	P	W	L	T	GF	GA	GD	Points
1	Aztec MA	10	8	1	1	39	9	30	25
2	New England Mutiny Reserves	10	6	2	2	18	11	7	20
3	Seacoast United Phantoms	10	4	3	3	14	15	-1	15
4	Long Island Fury	10	4	4	2	21	15	6	14
5	Seacoast United Mariners	10	1	7	2	3	32	-29	5
6	CFC Passion	10	0	7	3	3	17	-14	3

==== Mid Division ====
Place	Team	P	W	L	T	GF	GA	GD	Points
1	New York Athletic Club	10	7	1	2	28	7	21	23
2	Syracuse Lady Knights	10	5	3	2	17	19	-2	17
3	United FC Binghamton	10	2	4	4	12	16	-4	10
4	Millburn Magic	10	2	4	4	10	20	-10	10
5	FCW Elite	10	0	8	2	7	28	-21	2

==== South Division ====
Place	Team	P	W	L	T	GF	GA	GD	Points
1	Maryland Capitols FC	10	7	1	2	30	11	19	23
2	FC Bucks	10	4	1	5	26	18	8	17
3	Penn Legacy Inferno	10	5	4	1	17	13	4	16
4	BuxMont Torch FC	10	3	6	1	16	22	-6	10
5	Tidewater Sharks	10	2	5	3	12	21	-9	9

=== Midwest Conference ===
Place	Team	P	W	L	T	GF	GA	GD	Points
1	FC Milwaukee Nationals	5	5	0	0	14	2	+12	15
2	Ohio Galaxies	5	3	0	2	16	5	+11	11
3	Madison 56ers	5	3	2	0	11	6	+5	9
4	Ohio Premier Women's SC	4	2	1	1	7	4	+3	7
5	Indiana United	5	2	2	1	10	11	-1	7
6	Quad City Eagles	5	0	5	0	3	17	-15	0
7	Fort Wayne FC	5	0	5	0	3	19	-17	0

=== Northwest Conference ===
Place	Team	P	W	L	T	GF	GA	GD	Points
1	Spokane Shine	10	6	2	2	16	7	+9	20
2	Issaquah Soccer Club	10	5	1	4	27	6	+21	19
3	Portland Rain	10	5	3	2	23	11	+12	17
4	Emerald City FC	10	3	1	6	24	8	+16	15
5	Eugene Metro Futbol Club	10	3	5	2	15	21	-6	11
6	Oregon Rush	10	0	10	0	4	57	-53	0

=== Pacific Conference ===
==== North Division ====
Place	Team	P	W	L	T	GF	GA	GD	Points
1	California Storm	10	5	2	3	20	12	+8	18
2	North Bay FC Wave	10	5	2	3	13	8	+5	18
3	West Coast Wildcatz	10	4	1	5	18	17	+1	17
4	Central California HEAT	10	5	5	0	18	17	+1	15
5	Bay Area Breeze	10	3	3	4	17	14	+3	13
6	San Francisco Nighthawks	10	0	9	1	7	25	-18	1

==== South Division ====
Place	Team	P	W	L	T	GF	GA	GD	Points
1	San Diego WFC SeaLions	6	5	1	0	20	3	+17	15
2	Beach Futbol Club	6	4	2	0	15	4	+11	12
3	Ajax America Women	6	3	3	0	6	11	-5	9
4	LA Vikings	6	0	6	0	0	23	-23	0

=== Southeast Conference ===
Place	Team	P	W	L	T	GF	GA	GD	Points
1	Gulf Coast Texans	7	7	0	0	31	3	+28	21
2	Knoxville Lady Force	7	4	3	0	10	14	-4	12
3	Georgia Revolution	7	2	5	0	9	17	-8	6
4	Mississippi Fuego FC	6	1	5	0	7	15	-8	3
5	Mississippi Fuego FC U23	1	0	1	0	0	8	-8	0

=== Sunshine Conference ===
Place	Team	P	W	L	T	GF	GA	GD	Points
1	Tampa Bay Hellenic	9	8	0	1	19	5	+14	24
2	Florida Sol FC	9	5	2	2	24	10	+14	17
3	Team Boca Blast	9	2	3	4	8	10	-2	10
4	South Florida Strikers	9	1	6	2	10	24	-14	5
5	Clermont Phoenix	8	1	6	1	3	15	-12	4

== Playoffs ==
=== Northeast Atlantic Conference ===
Northeast Atlantic Quarterfinals
NAN2	(Massachusetts) New England Mutiny Reserves	1
NAS2	(Pennsylvania) FC Bucks	0
NAM2	(New York (state)) Syracuse Lady Knights	2
NAS1	Maryland Capitols FC	0

Northeast Atlantic Semifinals
NAN1	(Massachusetts) Aztec MA	2
NAN2	(Massachusetts) New England Mutiny Reserves	1
NAM1	(New York (state)) New York Athletic Club	4
NAM2	(New York (state)) Syracuse Lady Knights	0

Northeast Atlantic Final
NAN1	(Massachusetts) Aztec MA	1
NAM1	(New York (state)) New York Athletic Club (Forfeit)	0

=== Big Sky/Pacific/Northwest Conference ===
==== Big Sky-South playoff ====
- Winner goes to national semi-finals

South Division; Big Sky Conference
S1	Oklahoma Alliance FC	4
S2	American Eagles SC	2

==== Inter-divisional playoff ====
- Winner goes to national semi-finals

Division Semifinals
PS1	(California) San Diego WFC SeaLions	2
NC	(Washington (state)) Issaquah Soccer Club	1
BSN	(Utah) Salt Lake United	3
PN1	California Storm	1

Division Final
BSN	(Utah) Salt Lake United	3
PS1	(California) San Diego WFC SeaLions	1

=== Sunshine Conference ===
Sunshine Semifinals
2	Florida Sol FC	2
3	(Florida) Team Boca Blast	1
1	(Florida) Tampa Bay Hellenic	3
4	South Florida Strikers	1

Sunshine Final
1	(Florida) Tampa Bay Hellenic	-
2	Florida Sol FC	-

The Sunshine division championship was cancelled due to a high number of players returning to college.

=== WPSL Championship ===
WPSL Semifinals
(Massachusetts) Aztec MA	1
Oklahoma Alliance	0
(Florida) Gulf Coast Texans	3
(Utah) Salt Lake United	0

WPSL Final
(Florida) Gulf Coast Texans	4
(Massachusetts) Aztec MA	0

==== Composite top 16 bracket ====
Regional semi-finals
(Massachusetts) Aztec MA	2
(Massachusetts) Mutiny Reserves	1
(New York (state)) NYAC	4
(New York (state)) Syracuse Lady Knights	0
(Texas) FCD Women	1st
Oklahoma Alliance	2nd
American Eagles SC	3rd
-	-
(Florida) Gulf Coast Texans	1st
(Tennessee) Knoxville Lady Force	2nd
(Florida) Tampa Bay Hellenic	1st
Florida Sol FC	2nd
(California) San Diego SeaLions	2
(Washington (state)) Issaquah Soccer Club	1
(Utah) Salt Lake United	3
(California) Storm Elk Grove	1

Regional finals
(Massachusetts) Aztec MA	w/o
(New York (state)) NYAC	-
Oklahoma Alliance	4
American Eagles SC	2
(Florida) Gulf Coast Texans	w/o
-	-
(Utah) Salt Lake United	3
(California) San Diego SeaLions	1

National semi-finals
(Massachusetts) Aztec MA	1
Oklahoma Alliance	0
(Florida) Gulf Coast Texans	3
(Utah) Salt Lake United	0

National finals
(Florida) Gulf Coast Texans	4
(Massachusetts) Aztec MA	0
