= Lake Myrtle Sports Complex =

Multi-purpose sports complex in Auburndale, Florida

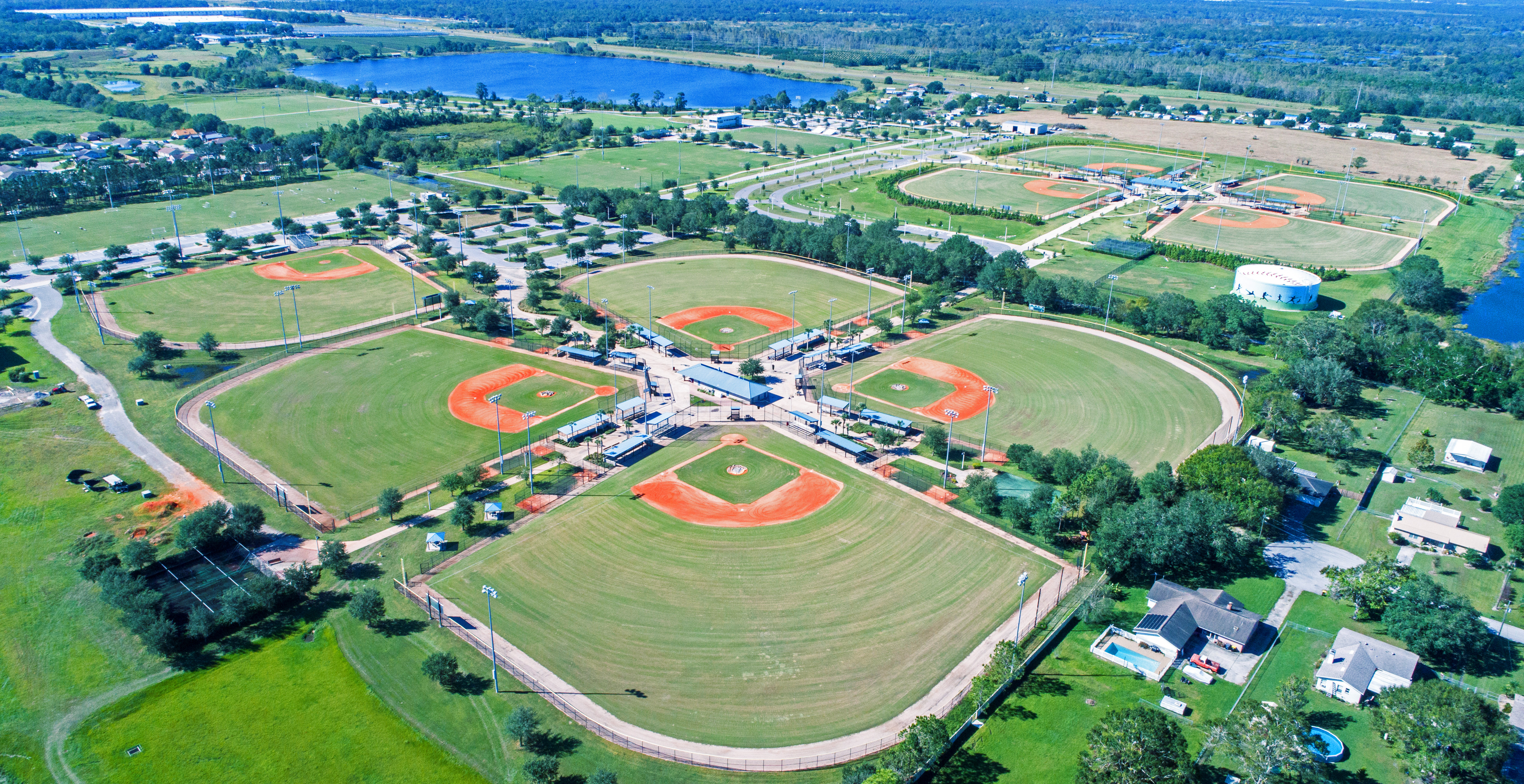

- Location within Florida Location within the United States
- Location: Auburndale, Florida, United States
- Coordinates: 28°5′42″N 81°49′20″W
- Owner: City of Auburndale
- Capacity: 1,500 (soccer); 500 (baseball)

Construction
- Opened: 2009
- Cost: $ 21 million

Tenants
- Florida Tropics SC (UPSL) (2019–); Lakeland Tropics (USOC) (2019)

Lake Myrtle Sports Complex is a multi-purpose sports complex located in Auburndale within the state of Florida, in the United States.

== Facilities ==
The site currently consists of eleven soccer fields, nine baseball fields, and facilities to host top-level sports events. The Florida Sports Hall of Fame is also located in the complex.

=== Main Event Fields ===
The park has two main stadium fields, one for soccer capable of accommodating 1,500 spectators and one for baseball that can seat 500 people.
