= Craig League =

1950s American women's soccer league

The Craig Club Girls' Soccer League, commonly known as the Craig League, was a women's soccer league in St. Louis, Missouri. Taking place in the early 1950s, it is sometimes recognized as the first organized women's soccer league in the United States.

== History ==
=== Background ===
From its inception as an organized sport in the 19th century, soccer was seen as a men's sport, and there is little record of organized soccer being played by women. There exist U.S. Soccer Federation notes from 1919 about a women's league in Bridgeport, Connecticut, possibly involving local high school students. The record of early women's soccer is otherwise incomplete or unknown.

=== Founding ===
In 1950, Father Walter Craig of St. Matthew's Catholic Church in St. Louis, Missouri founded the Craig Club, with plans to organize youth leagues in several sports. This included a women's soccer league, a generally unheard-of idea at this time. The league included about 70 players between the ages of 16 and 22, playing on four teams: the Bobby Soccers, Bombers, Co-eds and Flyers. The first round of play was documented in the St. Louis Post-Dispatch on November 19, 1950.

=== Play and disbandment ===
Most news coverage of the league documents it as a novelty or sideshow. According to newspapers of the time, the crowds numbered in the hundreds. After the first season, the league gained some additional players, but after the second season, the league was disbanded. According to Dorothy "Dot" Gilliam, a player for the Bobby Soccers, "It just fell apart, for one reason or another…some girls went off to college, some got married and got pregnant, things like that. There wasn't any interest in anyone behind us coming up in school who wanted to carry on. It was over, but it was fun while it lasted."

== Aftermath ==
The Craig League ultimately did not start a trend. The first varsity women's college soccer game would not take place until 1976.

Several of the league's players reunited in the 1990s and were honored at a dinner at the St. Louis Soccer Hall of Fame. As of 2022, only one player from the league was still alive.

Father Craig died in 1971.
