= J.B. Marine S.C. =

American women's soccer club

Jefferson Barracks Marine Soccer Club
- Type: Soccer club
- Founded: 1978
- Founder: George Foster
- Headquarters: St. Louis, United States
- Website: jbmarinesoccer.com

Jefferson Barracks Marine Soccer Club is an American women's soccer club fielding over thirty teams throughout the St. Louis area.

== Honors ==
- National championships (6)
  - Women's Cup: 2011
    - Regional Runners-up: 2010, 2012
  - Women's Amateur: 2001
  - Women's U-23: 1998, 2004
    - National Semifinals: 2008, 2009
  - Women's U-19: 1991
- Regional championships (22)
- Missouri state championships (74)

== Notable former players ==
- Lori Chalupny - 2008 Olympic Gold medalist
- Becky Sauerbrunn - 2012 Olympic Gold medalist
- Lauren Fowlkes - 2008 U-20 World Cup champion
