= USASA National Women's Open =

American women's soccer tournament

The USASA National Women's Open was an American women's soccer tournament run by the United States Adult Soccer Association. It began in 1996, and from 2009 to 2012 it was known as the Women's Cup. Before the formation of the Women's Open, the Women's Amateur was the top national cup competition.

== History ==
It began as a tournament only contested by amateur and semi-pro teams, as teams from professional leagues (WUSA, WPS, and the NWSL) are not allowed to enter the competition. In 2012 though, the Chicago Red Stars, a professional club in the WPSL Elite, entered and won the competition. Similarly, the professional Houston Aces of WPSL won in 2013.

The defending Women's Cup champion is Olympic Club, who won the title in back-to-back tournaments in 2015 and 2016. The last open was held in 2016

== Tournament structure ==
=== 2009–2012 ===
In the regional phase of the competition, four to sixteen teams per region compete in a round-robin (or partial round-robin) tournament, playing at least three games.

The national finals feature the four regional winners in a two-round knockout tournament.

=== 2013–2016 ===
Teams apply to take part in the national championships, which is contested as an initial round-robin group, followed by a championship game if there are more than four teams participating.

== Finalists ==
By Year
Year	Winner	Score	Runner-up
1996	Dallas Lightning	2-1	Sacramento Storm
1997	Dallas Lightning	4–2	Sacramento Storm
1998	Ajax America	5-0	Dallas Lightning
1999	Auto Trader San Diego	14-0	Patrick Real Wyckoff
2000	Ajax America	2-1	Detroit Rocker Hawks
2001	Detroit Rocker Hawks	1-0	SoCal Blues
2002	SoCal Blues	5-0	Peninsula Aztecs
2003	Ajax America	(Note: Losing finalist and semifinalists unknown)	
2004	Ajax America	2-1	Detroit Jaguars
2005	FC Indiana	4-0	DCS Titans
2006	Dallas Roma F.C.		Sockers F.C. Chicago
2007	Ajax America	2-1	FC Indiana
2008	FC Indiana	(Note: All semifinalists known but results are not)	
2009	Chicago Eclipse Select	3-1	NYAC
2010	NYAC	2-0 (OT)	Dallas Premier
2011	J.B. Marine S.C.	2-1 (OT)	Sparta United WSC
2012	Chicago Red Stars	3-2	NYAC
2013	Houston Aces	(Note: Event contested as round-robin group)	Kansas City Dynamos
2014	NYAC	2-1	ASA Chesapeake Charge
2015	Olympic Club		ASA Chesapeake Charge
2016	Olympic Club	2-0	United FC

Cumulative
Team	Winners	Runners-up	Semifinalist / Top Four
Ajax America	5 (1998, 2000, 2003, 2004, 2007)	-	1 (2008)
NYAC	2 (2010, 2014)	2 (2009, 2012)	1 (2015)
FC Indiana	2 (2005, 2008)	1 (2007)	-
Dallas Lightning	2 (1996, 1997)	1 (1998)	-
Olympic Club	2 (2015, 2016)	-	-
SoCal Blues	1 (2002)	1 (2001)	-
Detroit Rocker Hawks	1 (2001)	1 (2000)	-
Houston Aces	1 (2013)	-	1 (2014)
Chicago Red Stars	1 (2012)	-	-
J.B. Marine S.C.	1 (2011)	-	-
Chicago Eclipse Select	1 (2009)	-	-
Dallas Roma F.C.	1 (2006)	-	-
Auto Trader San Diego	1 (1999)	-	-
ASA Chesapeake Charge	-	2 (2014, 2015)	1 (2011)
Sacramento Storm	-	2 (1996, 1997)	-
Salt Lake City Sparta	-	1 (2011)	1 (2012, 2014)
United FC	-	1 (2016)	-
Kansas City Dynamos	-	1 (2013)	-
Dallas Premier	-	1 (2010)	-
DCS Titans	-	1 (2005)	-
Detroit Jaguars	-	1 (2004)	-
Peninsula Aztecs	-	1 (2002)	-
Patrick Real Wyckoff	-	1 (1999)	-
CO Sporting Fury	-	-	1 (2016)
Mothershucker	-	-	1 (2016)
Fredericksburg FC	-	-	1 (2015)
Fire and Ice Soccer Club	-	-	1 (2014)
Tampa Bay Hellenic	-	-	1 (2014)
Des Moines Menace	-	-	1 (2013)
Kansas City Shock	-	-	1 (2013)
Turbo D'Feeters	-	-	1 (2012)
Triad United Aces	-	-	1 (2011)
Kentucky Wanderers	-	-	1 (2010)
Houston Challengers	-	-	1 (2009)
Phoenix Inferno	-	-	1 (2009)
Philadelphia United German-Hungarians	-	-	1 (2008)
Dallas Sting	-	-	1 (2008)
