= Houston Aces =

- Full name: Houston Aces Soccer Club
- Founded: 2012
- Dissolved: 2024
- Stadium: Albion Campbell Road; Houston, Texas
- Capacity: 1,000
- President: Pascal Paul Piazza
- Head Coach: Natalia Ariza
- League: Women's Premier Soccer League
- 2024 (WPSL): 4th, Lone Star; Playoffs: Did not qualify
- Website: http://www.thehoustonaces.com/

The Houston Aces were an American women's soccer team that was founded in 2012. The Aces participate in the WPSL, the second tier of women's soccer in the United States and Canada, underneath the NWSL. The Aces play at Albion Campbell Road. They joined the United Women's Soccer league in 2016.

== History ==
The Aces' 2012 season was largely unimpressive, earning just 11 points from 12 games and finishing 7th out of 11 teams in the Big Sky – South division.

In 2013, the Aces were part of a group of seven teams slated to play in the second season of the WPSL Elite, which was to be a set of games played in addition to regular WPSL games (unlike the 2012 WPSL Elite that was truly its own league), but organization ultimately fell through.

The Aces won the 2013 National Women's Open, defeating all three other teams by a combined scoreline of 8-1; their academy team also qualified for the 2013 National Women's U23 competition, but failed to qualify for the final with a 1–2 record and a combined score of 4–8. This was accomplished as part of a 2013 season so far undefeated in all competitions, winning sixteen straight games from friendlies in May through mid-July - a far change from their 2012 season.

They followed these Open Cup and regular seasons successes with a deep run into the 2013 WPSL Playoffs, falling just short of the title in a 1–2 loss to the San Diego WFC SeaLions. During that time, it was reported that the Aces have ambitions to join the National Women's Soccer League, potentially as early as 2014. However, during the 2013-2014 off-season, the Houston Dynamo applied for an expansion slot to create the Houston Dash, effectively closing the door for the Aces.

For the 2014 season, the Aces officially took control of the Houston South Select, renaming the team as the Aces South Select Academy. Despite this growth and their success last season, the Aces struggled through 2014, dropping points in preseason and in Big Sky conference play, as well as finishing runners-up in the USASA Amateur Championships and finishing a distant fourth in their Open Cup title defense. Still, despite these struggles, they had another deep run in the WPSL playoff, once again making it to the final before losing by one goal to Beach Futbol Club (also from WPSL's Pac-South division).

In 2015, the Aces finished in 3rd place in Big Sky – South Division with 10 wins, 2 draws, and 2 losses. Then they did not qualify for the playoffs during their final season.

In early February 2016, the Aces moved to United Women's Soccer after having played 4 seasons in WPSL.

In 2016, the Aces finished in 3rd place in Western Conference with 4 wins, 1 draw, and 3 losses. They failed to make the UWS championship for their first time.

In 2017, the Aces finished in 4th place in Western Conference with 3 wins, 0 draws, and 5 losses. They failed to make the playoffs again.

Before the season began in 2018, the Aces were added an expansion team HAR FC and placed the newly formed Southwest Conference.

In 2018, the Aces went undefeated in the season with 8 straight wins and won the Southwest Conference clinching the 2018 UWS playoffs for the first time since they moved to the league in 2016, making their third overall playoff appearance. The Aces succeeded to win their first UWS title after defeating the Lancaster Inferno Rush in the championship finals with a 1-0 victory in extra time.

In 2019, the Aces captured their second straight Southwest Conference Championship as they capped off their second consecutive undefeated season outscoring their opponents 30-3 in 6 wins. Their defending champions has ended after they lost to LA Galaxy OC 4-1 at the 2019 UWS Playoffs.

In 2020, the Aces had returned to WPSL after they having played 4 seasons from UWS, most recently, the 2018 United Women’s Soccer championship.

Their 2020 upcoming WPSL season has been cancelled due COVID-19 pandemic right after returning to the league. In 2021, the Aces has finished in 2nd place in Red River - South Division with 5 wins, 1 draw, and 2 losses.

In 2022, the Aces finished in 2nd place in Red River - South Division with 6 wins, 1 draw, and 3 losses. However they didn't qualify to get the spot for the season playoffs.

The Aces finished in 2nd place in Texas Triangle with 6 wins, 2 draws, and 2 losses, they were unable to make it to the playoffs throughout the 2023 season for the second consecutive year.

In 2024, unfortunately the Aces didn't advance to the postseason after they finished in 4th place in Lone Star with 4 wins, 3 draws, and 3 losses before ending their final season.

In 2025, the Aces officially departed from WPSL once again.

== Season ==
Year	Division	League	Reg. season	Playoffs	USASA National Women's Open
2012	2	WPSL	7th, Big Sky South	Did not qualify	Region III runner-up
2013	2	WPSL	1st, Big Sky South	National runners-up	Champions
2014	2	WPSL	1st, Big Sky South	National runners-up	Tie-4th
2015	2	WPSL	3rd, Big Sky	Did not qualify	Did not qualify
2016	2	UWS	3rd, West	Did not qualify	Did not qualify
2017	2	UWS	4th, West	Did not qualify	N/A
2018	2	UWS	1st, Southwest	Champions	N/A
2019	2	UWS	1st, Southwest	National Quarterfinals	N/A
2020	3	WPSL	Season cancelled due COVID-19 pandemic		
2021	4	WPSL	2nd, Red River South	Did not qualify	N/A
2022	4	WPSL	2nd, Red River South	Did not qualify	N/A
2023	4	WPSL	2nd, Texas Triangle	Did not qualify	N/A
2024	4	WPSL	4th, Lone Star	Did not qualify	N/A

== Honors ==
League Championships

- WPSL
  - (Runners-up) (2): 2013, 2014
- UWS
  - (winners) (1): 2018

Division Championships

- WPSL (2): 2013, 2014
- UWS (2): 2018, 2019

Women's Cup

- Champions (1): 2013
- Semi-finalist (1): 2014

== Staff ==
- (United States) Deb Schady, CEO/CFO, Co-Managing Member
- (United States) Pascal Piazza, President, Co-Founder, Co-Managing Member
- (Australia) Bill Van der Vlist, Referee Liaison
- (United States) Lindsay South Hamner, Player Liaison

== Players ==
=== 2012 ===
Source:

=== 2013 ===
Source:

=== 2014 ===
Source:

=== 2015 ===
Source:

=== 2016 ===
Source:

=== 2017 ===
Source:

=== 2018 ===
Source:

=== 2019 ===
Source:

== Home stadiums ==
- Houston Sports Park

=== Former Stadiums ===
- Houston Baptist University
- Delmar Stadium
- Darrell Tully Stadium
- The Kinkaid School
- Carl Lewis Stadium
