= Fort Wayne United FC Gryphons =

- Full name: Fort Wayne United FC Gryphons
- Nickname: Fort Wayne Gryphons
- Founded: 2013
- Stadium: Hefner Stadium; Fort Wayne, Indiana
- Capacity: 2,000
- Head Coach: (United States) Dave Bokhart
- Coach: (Scotland) Claire Ward
- League: USL Premier Development League (men's); United Women's Soccer (women's)
- Website: http://fwunitedfc.com/index.html

The Fort Wayne United FC Gryphons is a 3-tier (Academy, Elite, and Premier) developmental soccer club based in Fort Wayne, Indiana, and was created in 2013 by the merger of Fort Wayne Fever and Citadel Futbol Club. The club is a nonprofit (c)3 organization. The women's team competes in United Women's Soccer.

== History ==
The merger to create the club in 2013 left only one other competitor, Fort Wayne SportClub.

== Year-by-year ==
=== Women ===
Year	Division	League	Reg. season	Playoffs
2017	2	UWS	6th, Midwest	
2018	2	UWS	7th, Midwest	
2019				

== Sponsors ==
The current sponsor for uniforms is Puma. The soccer league has partnered with Puma since its creation in fall 2013. The league is also sponsored by Penn Station East Coast Subs, Parkview Health Network, and the Beasley National Soccer School.

== Uniforms ==
The original uniforms revealed in late May 2013, around the time tryouts were held for the first time.

The goalkeepers wear the same uniforms, except the jerseys are a long-sleeved orange jersey with purple accents and a short-sleeved purple jersey with white accents.
