= New York Athletic Club women's soccer team =

New York Athletic Club women's
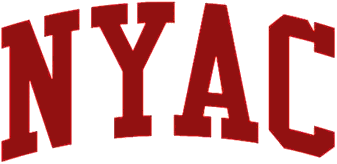
- Full name: New York Athletic Club Women's Soccer
- Nickname: NYAC
- Founded: 2005; 21 years ago
- Ground: New York Athletic Club
- Chairman: Peter Rihs
- Coach: (United States) Kim Wyant
- League: Women's Premier Soccer League
- 2015: Northeast Atlantic Conference, Power 5 Division
Home colors

New York Athletic Club Women's is an American women's soccer team, founded in 2005. The team is a member of the Women's Premier Soccer League, the second tier of women's soccer in the United States and Canada. The team plays in the North Division of the East Conference.

The team plays its home games at the New York Athletic Club on Travers Island in Pelham Manor, New York. The club's colors are red and blue.

The team has a sister organization called the New York Athletic Club, which plays in the National Premier Soccer League.

== Players ==
=== Current roster ===
Amatura, Marissa
Bustos, Lauren
Brennan, Alana
Di Martino, Vickie
Fitzpatrick, Shannon
Hardesty, Niki
Howell, Mikaela
Honor, Lily
Militelllo, Caroline
Melo, Natalie
Nowak, Monika
OSTER, DANIELLE
Paloscio, Stephanie
REISER, SOPHIE
ROMINE, NATALIE
Ryan, Chelsea
Shreck, Jess
SHEEHY, RACHEL
Simpkins, Callie
Solazzo, Elene
Salmon, Brooke
Sura, Emily
Spivack, Alec
Saunders, Tatiana

=== Notable former players ===
- Jen Hoy, 2013 NWSL Draftee
- Kim DeCesare, 2012 NWSL Draftee

== Year-by-year ==
As of July 25, 2025

| Year | Division | League | Reg. season | Playoffs | USASA National Women's Open |
|---|---|---|---|---|---|
| 2006 | 2 | WPSL | 6th, North Division | did not qualify | N/A |
| 2007 | 2 | WPSL | 7th, North Division | did not qualify | Champions |
| 2008 | 2 | WPSL | 5th, North Division | did not qualify | National semifinal |
| 2009 | 2 | WPSL | 9th, East Conference | did not qualify | Runner Up |
| 2010 | 2 | WPSL | 3rd, Central Division | did not qualify | Champions |
| 2011 | 2 | WPSL | 2nd, Mid-Atlantic Division | Eastern Quarterfinals | Regional semifinal |
| 2012 | 2 | WPSL | 1st, Mid Division | Northeast Atlantic Final | Runner Up |
| 2013 | 2 | WPSL | 1st, Tri-State Division | Regional Semifinal | 6th |
| 2014 | 2 | WPSL | 1st, Tri-State Division | Regional Finals | Champions |
| 2015 | 2 | WPSL | 2nd, Power 5 Division | DNQ | 4th |
| 2016 | 2 | WPSL | 1st, Mid-Atlantic Division | Regional Semifinals | did not enter |
| 2017 | 2 | WPSL | 5th, Metropolitan Division | did not qualify | N/A |
| 2018 | 2 | WPSL | 2nd, Metropolitan Division | did not qualify | N/A |
| 2019 | 2 | WPSL | 2nd, Metropolitan Division | did not qualify | N/A |
| 2020 | Season cancelled due to COVID-19 | | | | |
| 2021 | 4 | WPSL | 8th, Group D | did not qualify | N/A |
| 2022 | 4 | WPSL | 3rd, Metropolitan Division | did not qualify | N/A |
| 2023 | 4 | WPSL | 3rd, Metropolitan Division | did not qualify | N/A |
| 2024 | 4 | WPSL | 4th, Metropolitan Division | did not qualify | N/A |
| 2025 | 4 | WPSL | 5th, Metropolitan Division | did not qualify | N/A |

== Honors ==
- Women's Cup
  - Champions (1): 2014
  - Champions (1): 2010
  - Runners-up (1): 2012
  - Semifinalist (1): 2009
- Women's Amateur
  - Champions (1): 2007
  - Semifinalist (1): 2008

== Coaches ==
- (United States) Kim Wyant (current head)
- (United States) Michele Canning (current assistant)
- (United States) Courtney Carroll (2010–12)

== Stadia ==
- New York Athletic Club (2008–present)
