= Real Salt Lake Women =

Soccer team

RSL Women
- Full name: Real Salt Lake Women
- Founded: 2008
- Dissolved: January 9, 2019; 7 years ago
- Stadium: Clyde Field, Utah Valley University; Orem, Utah
- Owner: Real Salt Lake
- League: United Women's Soccer

Real Salt Lake Women (previously known as Salt Lake United and Sparta Salt Lake) was an American women's soccer team that was founded in 2008. The team was a founding member of United Women's Soccer league, in the second tier of women's soccer in the United States and Canada. The team played in the Women's Premier Soccer League from 2008 to 2015.

Utah Royals FC of the National Women's Soccer League, also owned by Real Salt Lake, created a reserve team that would start play in the Women's Premier Soccer League in 2019. RSL Women was thus folded on January 9, 2019.

== Players ==
=== Notable former players ===
- (United States) Michele Vasconcelos, Drafted by the Chicago Red Stars (2017)
- (United States) Mariah Nogueira, Former player for the Seattle Reign

== Year-by-year ==
Year	Division	League	Reg. season	Playoffs	National Open
2008	2	WPSL	5th, Big Sky - North	Did not qualify	Did not enter
2009	2	WPSL	2nd, Big Sky - North	Did not qualify	Did not enter
2010	2	WPSL	4th, Big Sky - North	Did not qualify	Did not enter
2011	2	WPSL	3rd, Big Sky - North	Did not qualify	Runners-up
2012	2	WPSL	1st, Big Sky - North	National Semifinalists	Semifinalists
2013	2	WPSL	2nd, Big Sky - North	Did not qualify	Runners-up
2014	2	WPSL	3rd, Pacific - North	Did not qualify	Tie-fourth
2015	2	WPSL	3rd, Big Sky	WPSL Elite Final	Did not enter
2016	2	UWS	2nd, West	Did not qualify	Did not enter
2017	2	UWS	3nd, West	Did not qualify	Did not enter
2018	2	UWS	4th, West	Did not qualify	Did not enter

== Honors ==
- USASA National Women's Open
  - Runners-up: 2011
  - Semifinals: 2012
- USASA National Women's Amateur
  - Runners-up: 2013
- WPSL Playoffs
  - Semifinals: 2012
  - Big Sky Champions: 2012
  - WPSL Elite Champions: 2015

== Coaches ==
- (United States) Dennis Burrows 2008–2014
- (United States) Jeff Ginn 2015–2016
- (United States) Mark Davis 2016–2019

== Stadium ==
- Physical Education Playfield at Weber State University, Ogden, Utah 2008
- Woods Cross High School Stadium at Woods Cross High School, Woods Cross, Utah 2009
- Beetdigger Stadium at Jordan High School, Sandy, Utah, 2010–2013
- Rio Tinto Stadium, Sandy, Utah 2012–2013
- America First Field, Sandy, Utah 2014
- Ute Field, Salt Lake City, Utah 2015
- Davis and East High Schools, Salt Lake City, Utah 2016
- Clyde Field, Utah Valley University, Orem, Utah 2017–2018

== See also ==
- Utah Royals FC
- Utah soccer clubs
