= 2007 WPSL season =

Women's Premier Soccer League
- Season: 2007
- Champions: FC Indiana
- Longest winning run: Ajax America Women
- Longest unbeaten run: Ajax America Women Entire Season
- Longest losing run: Colorado Springs United

The 2007 Women's Premier Soccer League season was the 10th season of the WPSL.

FC Indiana finished the season as national champions, beating New England Mutiny in the WPSL Championship game in Tampa, Florida on 27 July 2007.

== Changes From 2006 ==
=== Name Changes ===
- Fort Lauderdale Fusion changed their name to Miami Kickers
- Philadelphia Pirates changed their name to Philadelphia Liberty

=== New Franchises ===
- Seven franchises joined the league this year:

Team name	Metro area	Location	Previous affiliation
Albuquerque Lady Asylum		Albuquerque, NM	expansion
Chicago United Breeze		Algonquin, IL	expansion
Claremont Stars		Claremont, CA	expansion
FC Twente3 IL		Chicago, IL	expansion
Real Shore FC		Lincroft, NJ	expansion
Rush Salt Lake City		Salt Lake City, UT	expansion
SoccerPlus Connecticut		New Britain, CT	expansion

=== Folding ===
- Seven teams left the league prior to the beginning of the season:
  - FC Virginia
  - Las Vegas Tabagators
  - Memphis Mercury
  - Miami Revolution
  - Michigan Phoenix
  - Rhode Island Rays
  - Tennessee Lady Blues

== Final standings ==
Purple indicates division title clinched
Green indicates playoff berth clinched

=== West Conference ===
Place	Team	P	W	L	T	GF	GA	GD	Points
1	Ajax America Women	16	16	0	0	71	8		48
2	San Diego WFC SeaLions	16	9	6	1	44	18		28
3	California Storm	16	10	5	1	52	16		31
4	Sonoma County Sol	16	8	5	3	32	20		27
5	Claremont Stars	15	5	5	5	35	23		20
6	San Francisco Nighthawks	14	2	7	5	22	36		11
7	Lamorinda East Bay Power	13	1	11	1	14	67		4
8	Sacramento Pride	13	1	12	0	5	80		3

=== Midwest Conference ===
Place	Team	P	W	L	T	GF	GA	GD	Points
1	FC Indiana	8	7	1	0	33	3		21
2	River Cities FC	8	7	1	0	37	2		21
3	FC Twente3 IL	8	2	6	0	11	25		6
4	FC St. Louis	8	2	6	0	12	37		6
5	Chicago United Breeze	8	2	6	0	10	37		6

=== Southern Conference ===
==== South Division ====
Place	Team	P	W	L	T	GF	GA	GD	Points
1	Tampa Bay Elite	8	6	0	2	29	5		20
2	Central Florida Strikers	8	4	1	3	19	9		15
3	Palm Beach United	8	4	3	1	19	10		13
4	Orlando Falcons	8	1	5	2	9	27		5
5	Miami Kickers	8	0	6	2	5	30		2

==== Southwest Division ====
Place	Team	P	W	L	T	GF	GA	GD	Points
1	Denver Diamonds	10	6	3	1	17	20		19
2	Rush Salt Lake City	10	6	4	0	16	13		18
3	Utah Spiders	10	5	2	3	15	11		17
4	Albuquerque Lady Asylum	9	5	4	0	24	12		15
5	Colorado Springs United	10	0	9	1	8	38		1

=== East Conference ===
==== North Division ====
Place	Team	P	W	L	T	GF	GA	GD	Points
1	New England Mutiny	10	7	0	3	34	3		24
2	Long Island Fury	10	7	1	2	34	6		23
3	SoccerPlus Connecticut	10	6	1	3	27	12		21
4	Adirondack Lynx	10	6	4	0	26	15		18
5	Massachusetts Stingers	10	6	4	0	26	15		18
6	Boston Aztec Women	10	5	4	1	20	12		16
7	New York Athletic Club	10	4	6	0	11	22		12
8	Bay State Select	10	2	7	1	13	26		7

==== Mid-Atlantic Division ====
Place	Team	P	W	L	T	GF	GA	GD	Points
1	Atlantic City Diablos	10	8	2	0	35	9		24
2	Northampton Laurels	10	5	5	0	12	23		15
3	Philadelphia Liberty	10	3	6	1	11	19		10
4	Real Shore FC	10	2	8	0	5	25		6
5	Central Delaware SA Future	10	1	8	1	13	31		4
6	Maryland Pride	10	1	9	0	6	39		3

== Playoffs ==
=== Conference Divisional Round ===
Long Island Fury 3-2 SoccerPlus Connecticut

=== Conference Semi-finals ===
New England Mutiny 6-0 Northampton Laurels
Atlantic City Diablos 3-1 Long Island Fury

=== Conference Finals ===
New England Mutiny 2-1 Atlantic City Diablos
Tampa Bay Elite 2-1 Denver Diamonds

- FC Indiana and Ajax America Women received byes to the national final four as the winners of their respective conferences

=== National Semi-finals ===
FC Indiana 1-1 Ajax America Women (Indiana wins 4-3 on penalties)
New England Mutiny 1-1 Tampa Bay Elite 1-1 (New England wins 5-4 on penalties)

=== WPSL Championship Game ===
FC Indiana 3-0 New England Mutiny
