= 2006 WPSL season =

Women's Premier Soccer League
- Season: 2006
- Champions: Long Island Fury
- Longest winning run: Tampa Bay Elite
- Longest unbeaten run: Tampa Bay Elite Entire Season
- Longest losing run: Miami Revolution Entire Season

The 2006 Women's Premier Soccer League season was the 9th season of the WPSL.

Long Island Fury finished the season as national champions.

== Changes From 2005 ==
=== Name Changes ===
- Boston-North Aztecs changed their name to Boston Aztec Women
- Elk Grove Pride changed their name to Sacramento Pride
- St. Louis Archers changed their name to River Cities FC

=== New Franchises ===
- Twenty franchises joined the league this year:

Team name	Metro area	Location	Previous affiliation
Adirondack Lynx		Saratoga Springs, NY	expansion
Atlantic City Diablos		Richland, NJ	expansion
Central Delaware SA Future		Dover, DE	expansion
Central Florida Strikers		Sanford, FL	expansion
Colorado Springs Sabers		Colorado Springs, CO	expansion
Denver Diamonds		Centennial, CO	expansion
FC St. Louis		St. Louis, MO	expansion
FC Virginia			expansion
Fort Lauderdale Fusion		Fort Lauderdale, FL	expansion
Long Island Fury		Uniondale, NY	expansion
Memphis Mercury			expansion
Miami Revolution			expansion
Michigan Phoenix			expansion
New York Athletic Club		Pelham, NY	expansion
Northampton Laurels		Allentown, PA	expansion
Orlando Falcons		Kissimmee, FL	expansion
Palm Beach United		West Palm Beach, FL	expansion
Sonoma County Sol		Santa Rosa, CA	expansion
Tampa Bay Elite			expansion
Tennessee Lady Blues		Franklin, TN	expansion

=== Folding ===
- Three teams left the league prior to the beginning of the season:
  - Everton FC America - The Colony, Texas
  - Houston Stars - Houston, Texas
  - Steel City Sparks - Pittsburgh, Pennsylvania

== Final standings ==
Purple indicates division title clinched
Green indicated playoffs clinched

=== West Conference ===
==== West Division ====
Place	Team	P	W	L	T	GF	GA	GD	Points
1	Ajax America Women	12	11	1	0	40	8		33
2	San Diego WFC SeaLions	12	10	1	1	31	8		31
3	California Storm	14	10	3	1	47	15		31
4	Sonoma County Sol	19	9	4	1	25	12		28
5	Lamorinda East Bay Power	14	5	9	0	26	28		15
6	San Francisco Nighthawks	14	3	9	2	16	34		11
7	Sacramento Pride	14	1	11	2	10	52		5
8	Las Vegas Tabagators	14	1	12	1	12	40		1

==== Southwest Division ====
Place	Team	P	W	L	T	GF	GA	GD	Points
1	Denver Diamonds	5	4	0	1	10	1		13
2	Colorado Springs Sabers	6	2	4	0	3	12		16
3	Utah Spiders	2	0	2	0	1	4		0

=== Central Conference ===
==== Midwest Division ====
Place	Team	P	W	L	T	GF	GA	GD	Points
1	River Cities FC	10	9	1	2	23	5		25
2	Tennessee Lady Blues	10	7	3	0	24	13		21
3	FC Indiana	10	5	2	3	25	9		18
4	Memphis Mercury	10	3	6	1	15	19		10
5	Michigan Phoenix	10	3	7	0	11	27		9
6	FC St. Louis	10	1	8	1	7	27		3

==== South Division ====
Place	Team	P	W	L	T	GF	GA	GD	Points
1	Tampa Bay Elite	10	10	0	0	28	5		30
2	Central Florida Strikers	10	6	3	1	22	13		19
3	Palm Beach United	10	4	5	0	12	17		12
4	Orlando Falcons	10	4	5	0	6	17		12
5	Fort Lauderdale Fusion	8	2	6	0	12	16		6
6	Miami Revolution	7	0	7	0	0	9		0

=== East Conference ===
==== North Division ====
Place	Team	P	W	L	T	GF	GA	GD	Points
1	Adirondack Lynx	10	7	3	0	22	15		21
2	Long Island Fury	10	6	2	2	30	8		20
3	New England Mutiny	10	6	3	1	24	13		19
4	Massachusetts Stingers	10	5	3	2	16	14		17
5	Bay State Select	10	5	5	0	19	25		15
6	New York Athletic Club	10	4	5	1	13	19		13
7	Boston Aztec Women	10	2	2	6	11	11		12
8	Rhode Island Rays	8	1	7	0	9	25		3

==== South Division ====
Place	Team	P	W	L	T	GF	GA	GD	Points
1	Atlantic City Diablos	10	8	1	1	19	5		25
2	Northampton Laurels	10	6	2	2	17	11		20
3	FC Virginia	10	6	3	1	22	11		19
4	Philadelphia Pirates	10	3	5	2	6	16		11
5	Maryland Pride	9	2	7	0	6	10		6
6	Central Delaware SA Future	9	1	7	1	4	14		4

== Playoffs ==
Conference Semifinals
Central Conference
South Conference
N1	Adirondack Lynx	3
S2	Northampton Laurels FC	2
East Conference
S1	Atlantic City Diablos	1
N2	Long Island Fury	2

Conference Finals
MW	River Cities FC	3
S	Tampa Bay Elite	1
SW	Denver Diamonds	0
W2	San Diego WFC SeaLions	1
N1	Adirondack Lynx	0
N2	Long Island Fury	2

National Semifinals
W1	Ajax America Women	1
C	River Cities FC	2
W2	San Diego WFC SeaLions	0
E	Long Island Fury	2

National Final
C	River Cities FC	0
E	Long Island Fury	1
