= Lara Barbieri =

Italian footballer (born 1986)

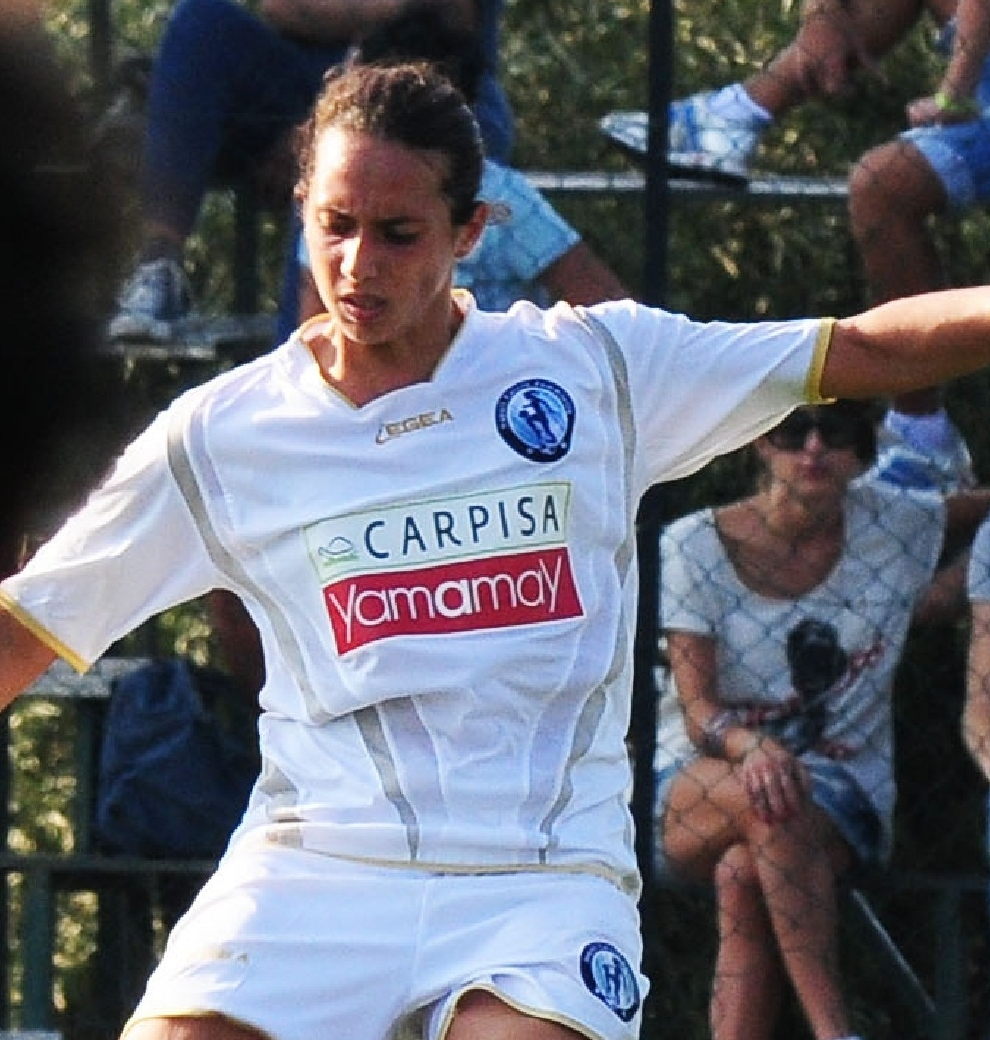

Personal information
- Date of birth: 2 February 1986 (age 40)
- Place of birth: Sassuolo, Italy
- Height: 1.68 m (5 ft 6 in)
- Position: Midfielder

Youth career
- 1998–2003: Reggiana

Senior career*
Years	Team	Apps	(Gls)
2003–2006	Reggiana	26	(1)
2006	Michigan Phoenix	10	(1)
2006–2011	Reggiana	66	(1)
2011–2012	Riviera di Romagna	23	(0)
2012–2013	Napoli	26	(2)
2013–2014	Chiasiellis	29	(3)
2014–2016	San Zaccaria	39	(2)
2016–2018	Sassuolo	11	(2)
2018–2019	→ Roma CF (loan)	15	(1)
2019–2020	Pontedera		
- * Club domestic league appearances and goals

Lara Barbieri (born 2 February 1986) is an Italian former professional footballer who played as a midfielder in Italy's Serie A.

== Biography ==
Barbieri has also played for Reggiana, Riviera di Romagna, Napoli and Michigan Phoenix in the United States' WPSL. She won the Italian Women's Cup in 2010, playing all the matches.

== Titles ==
- Italian Women's Cup: 2010

=== Appearances and goals ===
Updated on 27 February 2014.

Season	Club	League		Cup		Supercup		Total	
Season	Club	Apps	Goals	Apps	Goals	Apps	Goals	Apps	Goals
2003-2004	Reggiana	1	0	1	0	-	-	2	0
2004-2005	Reggiana	11	1	5	0	-	-	16	1
2005-2006	Reggiana	16	0	4	0	-	-	20	0
2006	Michigan Phoenix	10	1	-	-	-	-	10	1
2006-2007	Reggiana	9	0	4	1	-	-	13	1
2007-2008	Reggiana	12	0	5	0	-	-	17	0
2008-2009	Reggiana	16	0	3	0	-	-	19	0
2009-2010	Reggiana	19	0	6	0	-	-	25	0
2010-2011	Reggiana	10	0	1	0	1	0	12	0
Total Reggiana		94	1	29	1	1	0	124	2
2011-2012	Riviera di Romagna	23	0	2	0	-	-	25	0
2012-2013	Napoli	26	2	3	1	-	-	29	3
2013-2014	Chiasiellis	22	3	3	0	-	-	25	3
Totale carriera		175	7	37	2	1	0	213	9
