= 2014 WPSL season =

Women's Premier Soccer League
- Season: 2014
- Champions: Beach Futbol Club
- Biggest home win: Motor City FC 9-0 FC Indiana (May 31st); OKC FC 10-1 FC Tulsa Spirit (June 21st)
- Biggest away win: Seacoast United Mariners 1-9 Boston Breakers Reserves (June 28th); Primero de Mayo 0-8 North Bay FC Wave (July 6th)
- Longest winning run: 16 games, Beach Futbol Club
- Longest losing run: 10 games, Seacoast United Mariners

The 2014 Women's Premier Soccer League season is the 17th season of the WPSL. A total of 72 clubs across 7 conferences and 12 divisions participated in the season. The Houston Aces made it to their second consecutive WPSL final, but again lost by one goal to a Pac-South team, this time Beach Futbol Club. Beach FC's 16-0 season in a WPSL record, surpassing the 14-0 record set by Ajax America Women in 2007.

== Changes from 2013 ==
=== Conference/division shifts ===
- The Big Sky North division was dissolved, teams transferring to either the Pacific or new Big Sky conference
- The two divisions of the Northwest conference were consolidated together
- The Midwest conference split into two divisions, "Central" and "Great Lakes"

=== New/returning teams ===
Team name	Metro area	Location	Previous affiliation
Boston Breakers Reserves	Greater Boston	Hanover, Massachusetts	expansion (NWSL reserves)
Chicago Red Stars Reserves	Chicago market		expansion (NWSL reserves)
Chattanooga FC		Chattanooga, Tennessee	expansion
Cincinnati Lady Saints		Cincinnati, Ohio	WLS
Columbus Eagles FC		Columbus, Ohio	expansion
Fuerza FC		Bothell, Washington	expansion
FC Indiana		South Bend, Indiana	WPSL, WLS
FC Nashville Wolves	Nashville	Nashville, Tennessee	expansion
FC Pride		Indianapolis, Indiana	expansion
FC Westchester		White Plains, New York	expansion
Florida Krush			expansion
Jersey Blues FC		Morris Plains, New Jersey	WPSL (as Millburn Magic)
KC Courage	Kansas City	Olathe, Kansas	expansion
L.A. Hotspur F.C.	Greater Los Angeles Area	Los Angeles, California	expansion
Legends FC	Inland Empire	Chino, California	expansion
Liverpool Lady Warriors		The Colony, Texas	expansion
Minnesota TwinStars		Maple Grove, Minnesota	expansion
Motor City FC		Warren, Michigan	expansion
NTC Rush	Greater Orlando	Clermont, Florida	expansion
Primero de Mayo	Greater Sacramento	Sacramento, California	expansion
Rhode Island Reds FC	Rhode Island		expansion
Tampa Bay Hellenic	Tampa Bay Area	Tampa, Florida	WPSL, W-League (as VSI Tampa Bay FC)
Treasure Coast Dynamites		Port St. Lucie, Florida	expansion

=== Folded/moved teams ===
- Folded:
  - Ajax America Women
  - Bend Timbers
  - Central California HEAT
  - Emerald City FC
  - Fort Wayne FC
  - Indiana United
  - Kansas City Shock
  - New Jersey Blaze
  - Philadelphia Fever
  - Quad City Eagles
  - Spokane Shine
  - St. George United
  - Texas FC
  - Tidewater Sharks
  - United FC Binghamton
  - Utah Starzz
- Merged:
  - Storm Sacramento and Storm Elk Grove (back) into California Storm
- Moved to W-League:
  - Gulf Coast Texans
- Provisional status:
  - Lancaster Inferno
- Removed midseason:
  - Lions Swarm

== Playoffs ==
Regional semi-finals
(Connecticut) CFC Passion	2
(Maryland) ASA Charge	1
(New York (state)) NYAC	3
(Massachusetts) Breakers Reserves	2
Alabama FC	0
Oklahoma City FC	1
(Texas) Houston Aces	2
(Florida) Tampa Bay Hellenic	0
FC Indiana	1st
(Michigan) Motor City FC	2nd
(Illinois) Red Stars Reserves	1st
(Iowa) Des Moines Menace	2nd
(Washington (state)) Issaquah Soccer Club	1
California Storm	3
(California) North Bay FC Wave	2
(California) Beach Futbol Club	3

Regional finals
(Connecticut) CFC Passion	1
(New York (state)) NYAC	0
Oklahoma City FC	0
(Texas) Houston Aces	2
FC Indiana	0
(Illinois) Red Stars Reserves	2
California Storm	0
(California) Beach Futbol Club	4

National semi-finals
(Connecticut) CFC Passion	0
(Texas) Houston Aces	2
(Illinois) Red Stars Reserves	0
(California) Beach Futbol Club	4(OT)

National finals
(Texas) Houston Aces	0
(California) Beach Futbol Club	1
