= Meagan McCray =

American former soccer goalkeeper (born 1987)

Personal information
- Full name: Meagan Kelly McCray
- Date of birth: June 17, 1987 (age 39)
- Place of birth: Greenbrae, California, U.S.
- Height: 5 ft 9 in (1.75 m)
- Position: Goalkeeper

College career
Years	Team	Apps	(Gls)
2005–2008	Santa Clara Broncos	44	

Senior career*
Years	Team	Apps	(Gls)
2006–2007	Sonoma County Sol		
2009	FC Gold Pride	0	(0)
2010	Washington Freedom	1	(0)
2011	Valur		

International career
- United States U-16
2003	United States U-17		
2004	United States U-19		
2010	United States U-23		
- * Club domestic league appearances and goals

Meagan Kelly McCray (born June 17, 1987) is a retired American former soccer goalkeeper.

== Early life and education ==
McCray was born in Greenbrae, California and grew up in Novato, California. She attended San Marin High School. She later attended Santa Clara University and played for the Broncos women's soccer team for four years. Santa Clara qualified for three NCAA tournaments during her college career (2005-2007), including an NCAA quarterfinal appearance in 2005. McCray was an All-WCC honorable mention in her sophomore and senior seasons. McCray was selected as Santa Clara's Player of the Year, Defense MVP, and most inspirational player in her 2008 senior season.

== Club career ==
While enrolled at Santa Clara University, McCray appeared for Women's Premier Soccer League team Sonoma County Sol. She was on the club roster in 2006 and appeared in two league matches in 2007.

McCray signed as a free agent with FC Gold Pride of Women's Professional Soccer in 2009. She didn't make an appearance for the club, spending the majority of the season out injured with a separated shoulder.

After being released by FC Gold Pride, McCray joined Washington Freedom for the 2010 season following an invitation to try out for the club from then coach Jim Gabarra. McCray would serve as a developmental player, a reserve that could be activated if a member of the 18 active player roster is injured on a given match day. She was the Freedom's third string goalie behind two players with international experience. Washington's starter Erin McLeod was Canada national team starting goalkeeper, and the back up goalkeeper was United States national team legend Briana Scurry. McCray would go on to appear in a single WPS match, acting as a halftime substitute for Scurry in what would end up being the final match of Scurry's career due to a severe concussion. Following the WPS season, McCray was invited to play in Brandi Chastain's retirement match, which included her making a save on former US national team player Mia Hamm.

McCray moved to Iceland in 2011 to play for Úrvalsdeild team Valur. McCray started for Valur in their 2011–12 UEFA Women's Champions League tournament home and away ties against Glasgow City. Valur would be eliminated 4–1 on aggregate.

== International career ==
McCray represented the United States as multiple youth national team levels, from the U-16 to U-23. She served as an alternate for the US at the 2004 FIFA U-19 Women's World Championship.
