= Shek Borkowski =

Polish football manager

Personal information
- Full name: Shek Borkowski
- Date of birth: 30 January 1963 (age 63)
- Place of birth: Rzeszów, Poland
- Height: 1.83 m (6 ft 0 in)

Team information
- Current team: South Bend Lions (Head coach)

Managerial career
- Years: Team
- 2000–2007: F.C. Indiana Men
- 2004–2009: FC Indiana
- 2009–2010: Zvezda-2005
- 2011–2012: FC Indiana
- 2012–2017: Haiti
- 2017–2018: Puerto Rico
- 2018–2023: Puerto Rico Sol
- 2023-: South Bend Lions

Shek Borkowski (born 30 January 1963) is a Polish association football manager who is currently the head coach of South Bend Lions in the USL League Two. He previously managed the Puerto Rico women's national football team from 2017 to 2018. and the Haiti from 2012 to 2017.

Known primarily for his prominence within women's soccer, Borkowski has won 7 league titles and 2 cups in 3 countries. He is the only Polish manager to win domestic titles in three different countries.

He is most notable for his success with FC Indiana where he won two WPSL titles and two US Open Cup titles. Borkowski was named the 2005 WPSL National Coach of the Year and received the 2008 Field Turf W-League Coach of the Year award.
In 2009 he helped Zvezda-2005 to Russian Superior League title, and in 2010 led Zvezda to round 16 of the UEFA Women's Champions League.
In 2018/19, 2021 and 2022 he led Puerto Rico Sol FC to four consecutive Women's Liga Puerto Rico titles, winning 59 consecutive games.

== Managerial career ==
- 2023-: South Bend Lions
- 2018-2023: Puerto Rico Sol
- 2017–2018: Puerto Rico
- 2012–16: Haiti women's national football team, Haiti
- 2011–12: FC Indiana, USA
- 2009–2010: Zvezda-2005 Perm, Russia
- 2004–2009: FC Indiana, USA
- 2000–2007: FC Indiana (Men), USA

== Managerial statistics ==
As of 4 June 2023

Managerial record by team and tenure
Team	From	To	Record							
Team	From	To	P	W	D	L	GF	GA	GD	Win %
FC Indiana Men ISL	20 March 2002	5 August 2004	34	24	2	8	81	29	+52	70.59
FC Indiana WPSL	1 March 2005	23 August 2007	38	32	1	5	134	20	+114	84.21
FC Indiana W-League	23 March 2008	2 August 2008	14	13	0	1	54	6	+48	92.86
FC Indiana WPSL	2 March 2009	20 August 2009	10	8	1	1	33	9	+24	80.00
Zvezda-2005 RSL	31 October 2009	10 July 2010	17	10	2	5	45	16	+29	58.82
FC Indiana WPSL	27 March 2011	18 August 2012	22	15	5	2	44	12	+32	68.18
Haiti WNT	20 September 2012	19 February 2017	41	30	3	8	96	43	+53	73.17
Puerto Rico WNT	20 March 2017	19 May 2018	20	12	1	7	66	19	+47	60.00
Puerto Rico Sol LIGA PR	1 June 2018	Present	59	59	0	0	397	10	+387	100.00
Total			255	203	37	15	950	164	+786	79.61

== Titles ==
In nine seasons of club management, Borkowski has led three different clubs (in USA, Russia and Puerto Rico) to 7 domestic league and 2 cup titles and the UEFA Women's Champions League round of 16 qualification.

Russian Women's Supreme League (2009), Women's Premier Soccer League (2010), WPSL (2007), US Open Cup (2005, 2008)

Puerto Rico (women's)

- Liga Puerto Rico Champions (2022)
- Liga Puerto Rico Champions (2021)
- Liga Puerto Rico Champions (2018/19)

Haiti

- Caribbean Football Union U-20 Champions (2015)

Haiti

- Caribbean Football Union U-15 Champions (2014)

Russia
Zvezda-2005 Perm (2009–2010)

- UEFA Women's Champions League Round of 16

Zvezda-2005 Perm (2009–2010)

- Supreme League Champions

USA
FC Indiana (2008)

- US Open Cup Champions

USA
FC Indiana (2007)

- WPSL Champions

USA
FC Indiana (2005)

- WPSL Champions

USA
FC Indiana (2005)

- US Open Cup Champions

== Individual honors ==
- 2008 FieldTurf W-League Coach of the Year
- 2005 Women's Premier Soccer League Coach of the Year

== Coaching tree ==
Below is a list of coaches who played and/or coached under Shek Borkowski.

- Kaloyan Petkov – Kazakhstan WNT
- Natalia Zinchenko – Ukraine WNT
- Fiorda Charles – Haiti WNT
- Lorena Soto – Paraguay WNT
- Elena Suslova – Zvezda-2005 Perm
- Steve Brdarski – St Bonaventure University
- Craig Roberts – Ball State University
- Michael Voss – Grace College
- Sharolta Nonen – Florida International University
- Kristin Eggert – Liberty University
- Justin Crew – Ancilla College
- Annie Hamel – Simon Fraser University
- Alicia Schuck – Rollins College

== Notable players coached ==
- Mizuho Sakaguchi, JPN
- Mónica Ocampo, MEX
- Fatima Leyva, MEX
- Aivi Luik, AUS
- Lauren Sesselmann, CAN
- Ksenia Tsybutovich, RUS
- Elizabeta Tona, ITA
- Elena Danilova, RUS
- Lisa-Marie Woods, NOR
- Laura del Rio, ESP
- Ria Percival, NZL
- Marie-Eve Nault, CAN
- Sharolta Nonen, CAN
