= Fátima Leyva =

Mexican footballer (born 1980)

Personal information
- Full name: Fátima Leyva Morán
- Date of birth: 14 February 1980 (age 46)
- Place of birth: Mexico City, Mexico
- Height: 1.75 m (5 ft 9 in)
- Position: Midfielder

Team information
- Current team: Mexico U-14 (women) (Manager)

Senior career*
Years	Team	Apps	(Gls)
1999-2005	Laguna de Iztacalco		(9)
2005–2009	FC Indiana	64	(7)
2010	Zvezda Perm	24	(2)
2011–2015	Zorkiy Krasnogorsk	35	(18)
2016	Michigan Chill SC	7	(2)

International career
2000-2011	Mexico	62	(5)

Managerial career
- 2021–2022: Mexico U–17 (women) (assistant)
- 2023: Mexico U–20 (women) (assistant)
- 2023: Mexico (beach) (women)
- 2024: Mexico U-13 (women)
- 2025–: Mexico U-14 (women)
Medal record
Representing Mexico
Women's Football
Pan American Games
Bronze medal – third place	2003 Santo Domingo	Team competition
- * Club domestic league appearances and goals

Fátima Leyva Morán OLY (born 14 February 1980) is a retired Mexica footballer who played for the Mexico women's national football team. She played as a midfielder for the Michigan Chill SC of the WPSL.

== Playing career ==
During her international career, Leyva participated at numerous tournaments, namely the CONCACAF (1998), Nike Cup (1998, 2000), World Cup (1999), Pan American Games (1999, 2003) and Copa de Oro (2000) tournaments.

Leyva was the captain of FC Indiana in the W-League. In 2010, she signed for Russian champion Zvezda Perm, where she reunited her former coach Shek Borkowski. During her career with Zvezda Perm, Leyva and her team became runners-up in Russia's professional league. That same season, Zvezda Perm became quarter finalist in the UEFA Champions League.

Leyva's season with Zvezda Perm, drove Russian team FC Zorky Krasnogorsk to sign Leyva for their 2012–2013 season. During that season, FC Zorky became Russian League Champions and UEFA Champions League finalist.

In May 2016, Leyva signed with Michigan Chill SC and was named the team captain.

== Broadcasting career ==
After the Mexico national team failed to qualify for the 2003 women's World Cup, she was hired by Univision as a color commentator for its Cup transmissions.
