= 2011 Women's League Soccer season =

Women's League Soccer
- Season: 2011
- Champions: F.C. Indiana

The 2011 season is the inaugural year of Women's League Soccer.

For the season, most of the WLS clubs are located in the Midwestern United States.

== Elite Division ==
=== Standings ===
Pos	Team	Pld	W	D	L	GF	GA	GD	Pts
1	FC Indiana (C)	10	9	0	1	0	0	0	27
2	Fort Wayne FC	10	8	0	2	0	0	0	24
3	Chicago United Breeze	10	7	0	3	0	0	0	21
4	Indiana Invaders	10	3	0	7	0	0	0	9
5	Cleveland Internationals Women	10	2	0	8	0	0	0	6
6	Cincinnati Saints (R)	10	1	0	9	0	0	0	4

Updated to match(es) played on June 300, 2011. Source: womensleaguesoccer.com^{[usurped]}
Rules for classification: 1) points; 2) goal difference; 3) number of goals scored.
(C) Champions; (R) Relegated

=== Top goalscorers ===
Rank	Player	Club	G	GP
1	Mary Jones	Fort Wayne FC	13	10
2	Amy King	Fort Wayne FC	12	10
3	Maria Shipe	FC Indiana	10	10
4	Lacy Johnson	Indiana Invaders FC	7	8
5	Keisha Meyers	Indiana Invaders FC	6	9

=== Top GKs ===
Rank	Player	Club	GAA	GP
1	Jeanette Williams	FC Indiana	1.00	10
2	Dolorres Sits	Cleavland 23	1.70	10
3	Conney Sectetuer	Indiana Invaders FC	2.00	9
3	Adi Piscings	Chicago Breeze	2.00	9
3	Sharisse Yoder	Fort Wayne FC	2.00	9

== Division 2 ==
=== Standings ===
Pos	Team	Pld	W	D	L	GF	GA	GD	Pts
1	Evansville (C, P)	6	6	0	0	0	0	0	18
2	Michigan City	6	4	0	2	0	0	0	12
3	Kalamazoo	6	4	0	2	0	0	0	12
4	Lansing	6	4	0	2	0	0	0	12
5	Westfield (WLS)	6	1	0	5	0	0	0	3

Source: womensleaguesoccer.com^{[usurped]}
Rules for classification: 1) points; 2) goal difference; 3) number of goals scored.
(C) Champions; (P) Promoted

=== Top goalscorers ===
Rank	Player	Club	G	GP
1	Petra Lokern	Evansville	14	6
2	Sidney McCracken	Michigan City	11	6
3	Chelsea Hammer	Kalamazoo	9	6
4	Addie Silver	Lansing	8	6
4	Cat Montgomery	Westfield	8	6

=== Top GKs ===
Rank	Player	Club	GAA	GP
1	Loren Ipsum	Michigan City	1.00	6
2	Dottie Lorrsen	Evansville	2.00	6
3	Helga Consectetuer	Kalamazoo	3.00	6
4	Andie Sleester	Lansing	3.17	6
5	Elizabeth Siam	Westfield	3.50	6
