= Tina DiMartino =

American soccer player (born 1986)

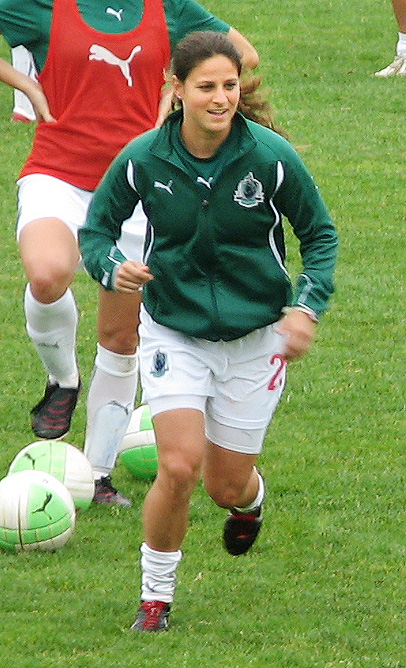

Personal information
- Full name: Christina DiMartino
- Date of birth: November 6, 1986 (age 40)
- Place of birth: Long Island, New York, United States
- Height: 5 ft 2 in (1.57 m)
- Position: Midfielder

Youth career
- Albertson Express

College career
Years	Team	Apps	(Gls)
2005–2008	UCLA Bruins		

Senior career*
Years	Team	Apps	(Gls)
2006–2008	Long Island Fury		
2009	FC Gold Pride	18	(0)
2010	Saint Louis Athletica	6	(0)
2010–2011	Philadelphia Independence	34	(6)
2013	Apollon Ladies		

International career
2006	United States U-20	19	(1)
2007–2008	United States U-23	9	(2)
2008–2009	United States	5	(1)
- * Club domestic league appearances and goals

Christina DiMartino (born November 6, 1986) is an American professional soccer midfielder. She previously played for the Philadelphia Independence of the WPS and was a member of the United States women's national soccer team.

== Early life ==
Born in Long Island, New York to Daniel and Patrice DiMartino, Christina attended Massapequa High School in Massapequa, New York, where she was a four-year varsity letterwinner and two-time Nassau County Player of the Year. DiMartino was a two-time Parade Magazine High School All-American in 2004 and 2005. In 2004, she was named NSCAA/adidas National High School Player of the Year, NSCAA/adidas High School All-American, and Gatorade State Player of the Year for New York. She was ranked as the number 12 overall recruit in the country and sixth best forward by Student Sports Magazine and Soccer Buzz named her a Top-25 U.S. High School Recruit.

DiMartino played for the Albertson Express and helped the club team capture four state championships. The team also won the WAGS Tournament and the Disney Cup in 2004.

=== UCLA ===
During DiMartino's freshman year at UCLA, she was the only freshman to start in all twenty-six matches for the Bruins, scoring five goals and assisting on five.

DiMartino helped the Bruins to four consecutive College Cups throughout her career.

DiMartino was a semifinalist for the prestigious Hermann Trophy in 2007, and was a finalist for the trophy in 2008.

== Playing career ==
=== Club ===
==== FC Gold Pride ====
DiMartino was selected third overall in the 2009 WPS Draft, going to FC Gold Pride. In her first season with the club, she started 18 games and recorded one assist.

==== Los Angeles Sol ====
In January 2010, DiMartino was traded to the Los Angeles Sol.

==== St. Louis Athletica ====
After the Sol ceased operations on January 28, 2010; in the ensuing dispersal draft for the players, DiMartino was selected by Saint Louis Athletica. On May 27, 2010, the Athletica folded in the middle of the 2010 WPS season due to financial problems, making all Athletica players free agents on June 1.

==== Philadelphia Independence ====
On June 7, 2010, DiMartino was then signed by the Philadelphia Independence, joining younger sister Gina DiMartino on the squad coached by the sisters' former youth team coach, Paul Riley.

==== FC Kansas City ====
DiMartino was selected in the fifth round (38th overall) of the 2013 NWSL Supplemental Draft by FC Kansas City for the inaugural season of the NWSL but did not play for the team.

=== International ===
DiMartino was a member of the fourth-place United States U-20 women's national soccer team that competed in the 2006 FIFA U-20 Women's World Championship in Russia, alongside UCLA teammates Danesha Adams, Lauren Cheney, Erin Hardy, and Valerie Henderson. After 2006, she also saw time in the United States U-23 women's national soccer team player pool. Her first appearance for the senior team was during the Four Nations Tournament in January 2008, appearing in a match against Finland and assisting on Lauren Cheney's goal. DiMartino scored her first goal for the senior national team in March 2009 during the Algarve Cup, against Denmark.

DiMartino has also made appearances for the U-16, U-17, and U-19 teams.

==== International goals ====
Key (expand for notes on "international goals" and sorting)
Location	Geographic location of the venue where the competition occurred Sorted by country name first, then by city name
Lineup	Start – played entire match on minute (off player) – substituted on at the minute indicated, and player was substituted off at the same time off minute (on player) – substituted off at the minute indicated, and player was substituted on at the same time (c) – captain Sorted by minutes played
Goal in match	Goal of total goals by the player in the match Sorted by total goals followed by goal number
Min	The minute in the match the goal was scored. For list that include caps, blank indicates played in the match but did not score a goal.
Assist/pass	The ball was passed by the player, which assisted in scoring the goal. This column depends on the availability and source of this information.
penalty or pk	Goal scored on penalty-kick which was awarded due to foul by opponent. (Goals scored in penalty-shoot-out, at the end of a tied match after extra-time, are not included.)
Score	The match score after the goal was scored. Sorted by goal difference, then by goal scored by the player's team
Result	The final score. Sorted by goal difference in the match, then by goal difference in penalty-shoot-out if it is taken, followed by goal scored by the player's team in the match, then by goal scored in the penalty-shoot-out. For matches with identical final scores, match ending in extra-time without penalty-shoot-out is a tougher match, therefore precede matches that ended in regulation
aet	The score at the end of extra-time; the match was tied at the end of 90' regulation
pso	Penalty-shoot-out score shown in parentheses; the match was tied at the end of extra-time
	Yellow background color – match at an invitational tournament
NOTE: some keys may not apply for a particular football player

Goal	Date	Location	Opponent	Lineup	Min	Assist/pass	Score	Result	Competition
1	2009-03-04	Lagos, Portugal	Denmark	Start (Tarpley, 46)	35	unassisted	2–0	2–0	2009 Algarve Cup – group stage

== Career statistics ==
=== Club career ===
Team	Season	League	Domestic League					Domestic Playoffs					Total				
Team	Season	League	Apps	Starts	Minutes	Goals	Assists	Apps	Starts	Minutes	Goals	Assists	Apps	Starts	Minutes	Goals	Assists
Long Island Fury	2006	WPSL															
Long Island Fury	2007	WPSL															
Long Island Fury	2008	WPSL															
		Total															
FC Gold Pride	2009	WPS	18	18	1530	0	1	–	–	–	–	–	18	18	1530	0	1
		Total	18	18	1530	0	1	–	–	–	–	–	18	18	1530	0	1
Career Total		–	10	5	450	0	0	–	–	–	–	–	10	5	450	0	0

=== International career ===
Nation	Year	International Appearances				
Nation	Year	Apps	Starts	Minutes	Goals	Assists
United States	2008	1	0	28	0	1
United States	2009	4	1	119	1	0
Career Total	2	5	1	147	1	1

== Personal ==
DiMartino has two younger sisters who have played at the youth national level: Gina DiMartino, a member of the United States U-20 women's national soccer team that won the 2008 FIFA U-20 Women's World Cup in Chile, and Vicki DiMartino, a member of the United States U-17 women's national soccer team that was runner-up at the inaugural 2008 FIFA U-17 Women's World Cup in New Zealand.
