= 2012 Women's League Soccer season =

Women's League Soccer

Women's League Soccer
- Season: 2012
- Champions: Des Moines Menace

The 2012 season was the second year for the Women's League Soccer (WLS).

For the season, most of the WLS clubs stayed in the Midwestern United States.

== Elite Division ==
=== Standings ===
Pos	Team	Pld	W	D	L	GF	GA	GD	Pts
1	FC Indiana (C)	7	6	0	1	33	5	+28	18
2	Fort Wayne FC	7	4	0	3	16	9	+7	12
3	Indiana Invaders	6	2	1	3	10	24	−14	7
4	Cleveland Internationals Women	7	2	1	4	5	21	−16	7
5	Cincinnati Saints	7	2	0	5	10	15	−5	6

Updated to match(es) played on January 30, 2013. Source: womensleaguesoccer.com^{[usurped]}
Rules for classification: 1) points; 2) goal difference; 3) number of goals scored.
(C) Champions
