= Lauren Sesselmann =

Canadian soccer player (born 1983)

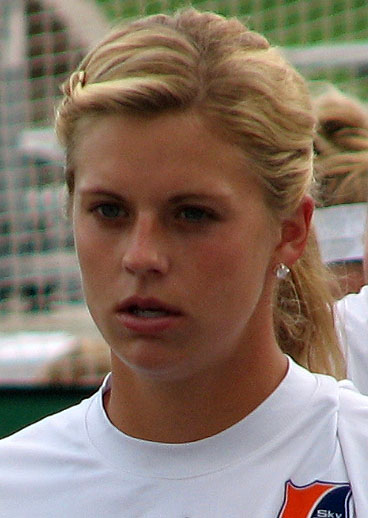
- Sesselmann in 2009

Personal information
- Full name: Lauren Marie Sesselmann
- Date of birth: August 14, 1983 (age 43)
- Place of birth: Marshfield, Wisconsin, U.S.
- Height: 1.73 m (5 ft 8 in)
- Positions: Defender; forward

Youth career
- 1997–2000: Notre Dame Academy

College career
Years	Team	Apps	(Gls)
2001–2005	Purdue Boilermakers		

Senior career*
Years	Team	Apps	(Gls)
2004	Steel City Sparks	2	(1)
2007–2008	F.C. Indiana	22	(13)
2009	Sky Blue FC	1	(0)
2010–2011	Atlanta Beat	20	(0)
2013	FC Kansas City	19	(0)
2014–2015	Houston Dash	1	(0)
2017–2018	Santa Clarita Blue Heat	23	(1)

International career^{‡}
2011–2015	Canada	46	(1)
Medal record
Women's soccer
Representing Canada
Olympic Games
Bronze medal – third place	2012 London	Team
Pan American Games
Gold medal – first place	2011 Guadalajara	Team
- * Club domestic league appearances and goals as of August 12, 2019 ‡ National team caps and goals as of July 3, 2017

Lauren Marie Sesselmann (born August 14, 1983) is a former soccer player and Olympic bronze medalist who played as a defender and forward. Born in the United States, she was a member of the Canada national team from 2011 to 2015 and is also a trainer, producer and host of the fitness DVD program Fit As A Pro with Lauren Sesselmann.

== Early life ==
Sesselmann was raised in Green Bay, Wisconsin. She starred in both soccer and basketball at Notre Dame Academy in Green Bay, winning multiple letters and helping Notre Dame to an undefeated season and a Wisconsin state championship in girls' basketball in 2001.

=== Purdue University ===
Sesselmann played collegiately at Purdue University from 2001 through 2005. She set six records for the Boilermakers in points, goals, assists, game-winning goals, multiple-goal games, and shots on goal registered. She was also named First Team All-Big Ten in 2003 and 2005.

== Club career ==
Following her time at Purdue, Sesselmann remained in the area to play for F.C. Indiana, based in Greater Lafayette. She played in both the Women's Premier Soccer League in 2007 and W-League in 2008 with the club. She scored nine goals and four assists in 14 games for the Lionesses in 2008, as they were runners-up in the W-League.

On January 16, 2009, Sesselmann was drafted by Chicago Red Stars with the 44th overall pick in the 2009 WPS Draft. She was waived before the season and signed by Sky Blue FC in May 2009. In 2010, Sesselmann attended training camp with Saint Louis Athletica, but was released during camp. She then signed with the Atlanta Beat, where manager Gareth O'Sullivan converted her from forward to defence. Sesselmann debuted with the Atlanta Beat on April 11, 2010 in a match against Philadelphia Independence, earning her first WPS start at left back.

In 2013, she joined FC Kansas City in the new National Women's Soccer League. On January 10, 2014, it was announced that Sesselmann was selected by the Houston Dash as the third pick in the 2014 NWSL Expansion Draft. However, her role with the Dash has been put into question by a statement from her agent stating it is "in her best interest to explore options as a free agent".

Following two years out of the game, Sesselmann joined the Santa Clarita Blue Heat in May 2017.

== International career ==
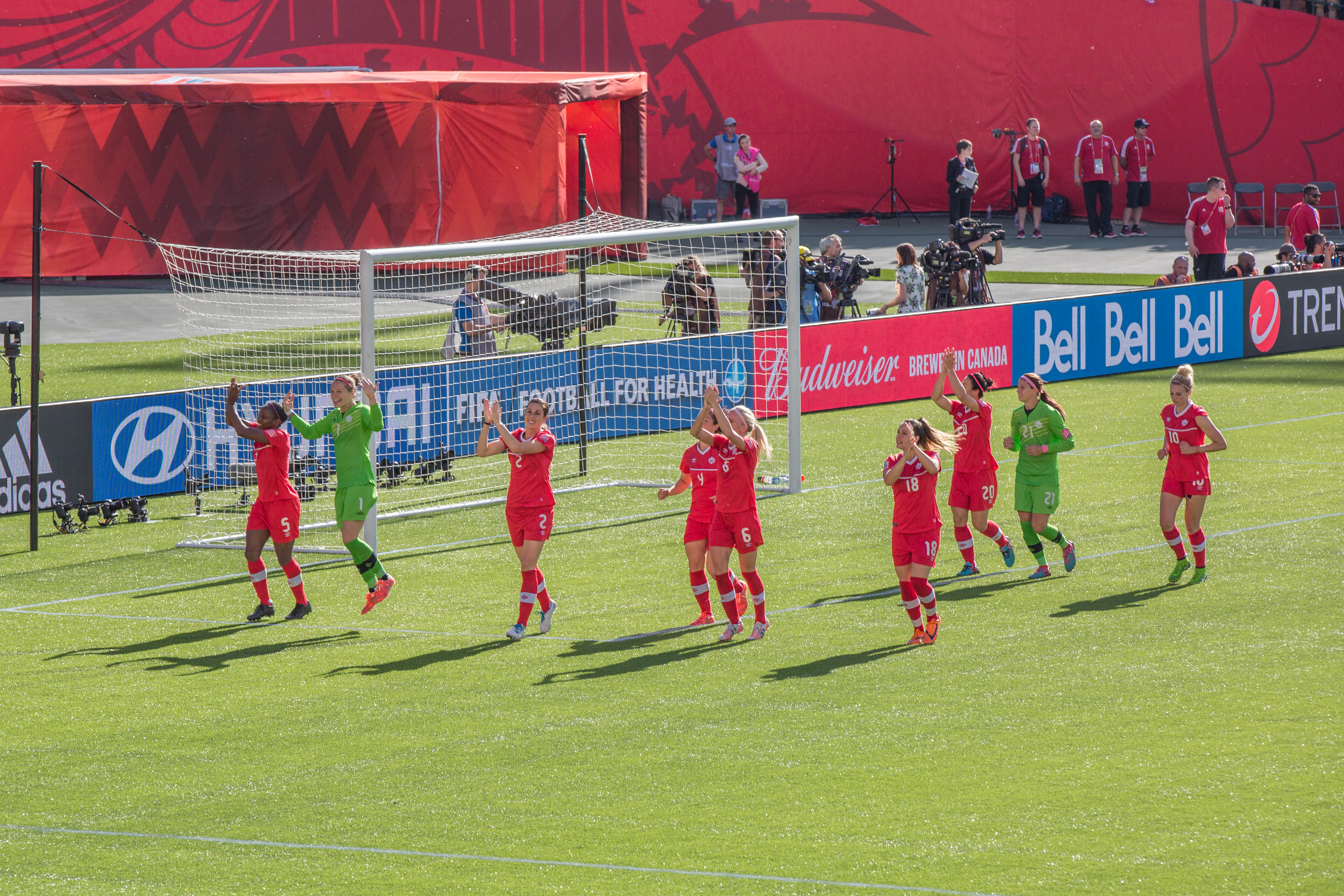
Sesselmann (far right) with Canada at the 2015 FIFA Women's World Cup.

Sesselmann acquired Canadian citizenship in 2010 through her father, who is from Newfoundland and Labrador, and was called up to the Canada women's national team for training camp leading up to two friendlies against the United States in September 2011. She won her first cap on September 17, 2011 against the USA, playing the full 90 minutes. She also started her second game on September 23, 2011.

Sesselmann was named to the 18-player Canadian squad for the 2011 Pan American Games at Guadalajara. She started in four of five matches and appeared as a substitute in the other as Canada went on to win the gold medal.

In Canada's run to a bronze medal at the 2012 Olympics, Sesselmann started all six matches.

Sesselmann represented Canada at the 2015 FIFA Women's World Cup. In the quarter-finals against England, she slipped and fell on the turf, which led to a goal for England.

Sesselmann was honoured by Canada Soccer in June 2017, along with fellow Olympic bronze medalists Jonelle Filigno, Robyn Gayle, Kaylyn Kyle, and Josée Bélanger.
