= Tampa Bay Elite =

American women's soccer team

Tampa Bay Elite was an American women's soccer team, founded in 2005 by Jim Cote and Adrian Bush. The team was a member of the Women's Premier Soccer League, the third tier of women's soccer in the United States and Canada, until 2007, when the team left the league and the franchise was terminated.

== Year-by-year ==
Year	Division	League	Reg. season	Playoffs
2006	2	WPSL	1st, Southern South	
2007	2	WPSL	1st, Southern South	National Semi Finals

== Honors ==
- WPSL Southern Conference Champions 2007
- WPSL Southern South Division Champions 2007
- WPSL Southern South Division Champions 2006
