= South Bend Lions FC =

Michiana FC Lions & Lionesses
- Full name: Michiana Fútbol Club
- Nicknames: Michiana FC Lions & Lionesses
- Founded: November 18, 2019; 6 years ago
- Dissolved: Dec 31 2024
- Stadium: Leighton Stadium
- Capacity: 3,500
- Owner: Ritchie Jeune
- Technical Director: Shek Borkowski
- Head coach: Shek Borkowski
- League: USL League Two
- 2023: 7th, Great Lakes Division; Playoffs: DNQ
- Website: https://www.michianalionsfc.com/

Michiana Fútbol Club formerly South Bend Lions Football Club was an American soccer club based in South Bend, Indiana, that played in USL League Two, the American pre-professional soccer league. The club was established on November 18, 2019. The 2022 USL2 campaign was successful by winning the Valley Division.

== History ==
On November 18, 2019, it was announced by USL League Two that South Bend Lions FC would be the newest team to join the league for their 2020 season, joining the Great Lakes Division. The logos and colors for the club were also unveiled at a press conference held in South Bend's County-City Building. Ritchie Jeune was introduced as the club's owner while Thiago Pinto, the head coach of Bethel University's soccer team, was introduced as the club's technical director. During the press conference, Jeune stated that South Bend was one of "three or four different locations" that his team visited before deciding to form a team in the city.

== Ownership ==
The club's owner is Ritchie Jeune, who is also the principal owner of Kettering Town, in England's Southern League Premier Division Central, Shantou Lions FC, a club based in China.

== Management team ==
| Position | Name | Nation |
|---|---|---|
| Technical director/Head Coach | Shek Borkowski | Poland |
| Assistant Coach | Nathaniel King | England |
| Assistant Coach | Erik Castro | Ecuador |
| Goalkeeper Coach | Alloysius Agu | Nigeria |
| Equipment Manager | Bobo Galoblow | United States |
| Head Data Analyst | Michael Bellina | United States |

== 2022 Roster ==
| Position | Name | Nation |
|---|---|---|
| Goalkeeper | Jacob Madden | United States |
| Goalkeeper | Owen Cornell | United States |
| Goalkeeper | Johnny Guedert | United States |
| Goalkeeper | Finn Popescu | Germany |
| Defender | Jack Empson | England |
| Defender | Daniel Nimick | England |
| Defender | Jaylen Shannon | United States |
| Defender | Josh Ramsey | United States |
| Defender | Jonny Mora | United States |
| Defender | Diego Rodriguez | United States |
| Defender | Joao De Oliviera | Brazil |
| Defender | Lucas Barankiewciz | Brazil |
| Midfielder | Collins Tanor | Ghana |
| Midfielder | Brennan Creek | United States |
| Midfielder | Duvan Canchila | (Colombia) Columbia |
| Midfielder | Landon Fisher | United States |
| Midfielder | Tim Noeding | Germany |
| Midfielder | Gabriel Nyenka Jr | Liberia |
| Midfielder | Sebastian Green | United States |
| Midfielder | Daniel Lynch | United States |
| Forward | Fumiya Shiraishi | Japan |
| Forward | George Herbert | England |
| Forward | Kainan Dos Santos | Brazil |
| Forward | Connor Duggan | England |
| Forward | Andrew Michael Andrew | Tanzania |

== Statistics and records ==
=== Season-by-season ===
As of 31 March 2025

| Season | USL League Two | | | | | | | | Finals | USOC | CONCACAF | Top Scorer | |
| Season | P | W | D | L | GF | GA | Pts | Position | Finals | USOC | CONCACAF | Player | Goals |
|---|---|---|---|---|---|---|---|---|---|---|---|---|---|
| 2020 | Season cancelled due to 2019-2020 Coronavirus Pandemic | | | | | | | | | | | | |
| 2021 | 14 | 5 | 4 | 5 | 27 | 17 | 26 | 5th, Great Lakes Division | did not qualify | Ineligible | — | (Ghana) Nana Tuffour | 6 |
| 2022 | 14 | 10 | 2 | 2 | 40 | 12 | 32 | 1st, Valley Division | Conference Quarterfinals | did not qualify | — | (Brazil) Kainan Dos Santos | 10 |
| 2023 | 12 | 0 | 3 | 9 | 8 | 33 | 3 | 7th, Great Lakes Division | did not qualify | did not qualify | — | (England) Sahel Yessen | 4 |
| 2024 | 14 | 0 | 2 | 12 | 6 | 55 | 2 | 8th, Great Lakes Division | did not qualify | did not qualify | --- | | |

== Youth development ==
The club has grown to include a successful USL-Academy boys team (Summer 2023) that currently plays in USL-Academy League play. As well as women's programs to debut (summer 2024) USL W League Lionesses and USL-A women's team.

== See also ==
- USL League Two
