= FC Twente3 IL =

- Full name: Football Club Twente3 IL
- Founded: 2006
- Ground: Hoyne Field
- Chairman: (United States) Richard Drake
- Manager: (United States) Richard Drake
- League: Women's Premier Soccer League
- 2009: 5th, Midwest Conference
Home colors	Away colors

FC Twente3 IL is an American women's soccer team founded in 2006. The team is a member of the Women's Premier Soccer League, the third tier of women's soccer in the United States and Canada. The team plays in the Midwest Conference.

The team plays its home games at Hoyne Field of Loyola University in Chicago, Illinois. The club's colors are red, white and black.

== Year-by-year ==
Year	Division	League	Reg. season	Playoffs
2007	2	WPSL	3rd, Midwest	Did not qualify
2008	2	WPSL	5th, Midwest	Did not qualify
2009	2	WPSL	5th, Midwest	It looks like they only played one game

== Coaches ==
- (United States) Richard Drake 2007–present

== Stadia ==
- Hoyne Field, Chicago, Illinois 2007–present
