= Women's League Soccer =

American football league

- Founded: 2011
- Folded: 2013
- Country: United States
- Confederation: CONCACAF
- Number of clubs: 6
- Level on pyramid: 1
- Relegation to: WLS Division 2
- Website: womensleaguesoccer.com

The Women's League Soccer (WLS) was a regional semi-professional women's soccer league in the United States that was created in 2010 and began its first season 2011. After the 2012 season, the league transitioned to indoor soccer under the name "Women's Arena Soccer League".

Contrasting significantly from other soccer leagues in the U.S., WLS intended to be an open entry, promotion and relegation competition. The league observes all FIFA standards, rules, player transfer windows and international calendar. The league consisted of six teams and the seasons lasted from May to the end of July. The league was largely the idea of Shek Borkowski. It was initially planned to be named "Women's Major League Soccer", but was changed prior to the start of the first season.

== Format ==
WLS Elite Division consists of six teams. It is intended that future entrants will join the league's Division 2 and require promotion to the top level, while the club finishing last is replaced with the winner of Division 2. An Elite Division season will consist of 10 games combined. Each club will play a home-and-home set against each other. The season started in May and ended in June.

WLS Division 2 currently consists of five teams and plays six games per season.

The team in first place after the last day of play is the champion, gaining the title of WLS Champion. Standings are determined by points a club has gained during a season. A win is worth 3 points, a draw 1, and a loss 0. The tiebreakers are in descending order goal difference, goals for, and head-to-head results. If the tie cannot be broken a tiebreaking game is held.

== Current clubs ==
Elite Division

- Chicago Breeze
- Cincinnati Saints*
- Cleveland FC
- FC Indiana 1923
- Fort Wayne SC
- Indiana Invaders FC

Division 2

- Evansville*
- Kalamazoo
- Lansing
- Michigan City
- Westfield

*To switch leagues for 2012 season

== History ==
- 2011
- 2012
- 2013
