= F.C. Indiana =

American women's soccer team

FC Indiana
- Full name: Football Club Indiana
- Nickname: The Lionesses
- Founded: 2000
- Stadium: Newton Park
- Capacity: 1,100
- Chairman: Shek Borkowski
- Head coach: Shek Borkowski
- League: United Women's Soccer
| Home colors | Away colors |

F.C. Indiana, also known as F.C. Indiana Lionesses, is an American women's soccer team based in Indiana. Founded in 2003, the team is currently a member of the United Women's Soccer league. They play their home games at Newton Park in Lakeville, Indiana.

The team has an associated men's team, also called F.C. Indiana Lions, who play in the National Premier Soccer League and Premier Arena Soccer League. The club's colors are red and white.

== History ==
In 2005, FC Indiana became the second North American women's team ever to win a league and cup double, capturing the WPSL national championship and the USASA Women's Open national championship (the Carolina Courage of the former Women's United Soccer Association [WUSA] won the Founder's Cup and WUSA league title in 2002).

FC Indiana won the 2005 WPSL title, having defeated host New England Mutiny 4–0 in the 2005 semifinals and the California Storm 5–4 (featuring internationals Brandi Chastain, Leslie Osborne and Sissi) in the 2005 finals.

In 2007, the club won its second WPSL title in three seasons, defeating the New England Mutiny 3–0. In October 2007, FC Indiana joined the W-League, consistently winning their division before returning to the WPSL for the 2011 season.

In 2012, they participated in the WPSL Elite, finishing at the bottom of the table.

In December 2016, F.C. Indiana joined the newly formed Midwest Conference of United Women's Soccer as an expansion team.

== Players ==
=== 2017 roster ===
Note: Flags indicate national team as defined under FIFA eligibility rules; some limited exceptions apply. Players may hold more than one non-FIFA nationality.

| No. | Pos. | Nation | Player |
|---|---|---|---|
| 00 | GK | USA | Tarah Hobbs |
| 1 | GK | ECU | Andrea Vera |
| 2 | FW | USA | Jennifer Reyes |
| 3 | DF | ENG | Lisa Ryan |
| 4 | MF | USA | Denise Veldman |
| 5 | MF | USA | Gabby Veldman |
| 6 | MF | USA | Maggie Hartnagel |
| 7 | DF | PUR | Kelley Johnson |
| 8 | FW | AUT | Annelie Leitner |
| 9 | FW | PUR | Ashley Johnson |
| 10 | MF | JPN | Hikaru Nakamura |

| No. | Pos. | Nation | Player |
|---|---|---|---|
| 11 | MF | PHI | Ryley Bugay |
| 13 | FW | USA | Rana Hoffbauer |
| 14 | MF | USA | Mirae Whitaker |
| 16 | MF | PHI | Samantha Bugay |
| 17 | MF | USA | Carly Mirwaldt |
| 21 | FW | BRA | Janaina Novaes Miknus |
| 22 | MF | JPN | Yo Tachibana |
| 24 | DF | GUA | Jennifer Muñoz |
| 25 | DF | USA | Ali Castaneda |
| 26 | FW | USA | Sam Kambol |
| 45 | MF | USA | Olivia Hansen |
| 33 | DF | MEX | Marlen Ortiz |

=== Notable former players ===
The following players have played at the international or professional level:

- (Australia) Aivi Luik
- (Canada) Sasha Andrews
- (Canada) Robyn Gayle
- (Canada) Kelly Parker
- (Canada) Lauren Sesselmann
- (Canada) Sharolta Nonen
- (Costa Rica) Amara Wilson
- (Ghana) Elizabeth Addo
- (Ghana) Adjoa Bayor
- (Haiti) Shanna Hudson
- (Italy) Elisabetta Tona
- (Japan) Mizuho Sakaguchi
- (Mexico) Maribel Domínguez
- (Mexico) Judith Flores
- (Mexico) Fátima Leyva
- (Mexico) Mónica Ocampo
- (Mexico) Pamela Tajonar
- (Mexico) Paty Perez
- (Mexico) Guadalupe Worbis
- (Nigeria) Ifeanyi Chiejine
- (Nigeria) Vera Okolo
- (Norway) Lisa-Marie Woods
- (Panama) Marta Cox
- (Russia) Elena Danilova
- (Russia) Elena Terekhova
- (Scotland) Shannon Lynn
- (Spain) Laura del Río
- (Spain) María Ruiz
- (South Africa) Noko Matlou
- (South Africa) Veronica Phewa
- (South Africa) Jermaine Seoposengwe
- (United States) Julie Augustyniak
- (United States) Nancy Augustyniak
- (United States) Brittany Bock
- (United States) Kerri Hanks
- (United States) Kristin Luckenbill
- (United States) Jessica O'Rourke
- (United States) Erika Prado
- (United States) Jordan Clark
- (United States) Christie Shaner
- (United States) Julianne Sitch

== Coaching staff ==
General manager and head coach

(Poland) Shek Borkowski (2004–)

Assistant coach

(Ecuador) Christian Castro

(Ecuador) Eric Castro

== Year-by-year ==
Season-by-season records
| Year | Division | League | Regular season | Playoffs | National Cup |
|---|---|---|---|---|---|
| 2005 | 1 | WPSL | 1st, Central | Champions | Champions |
| 2006 | 1 | WPSL | 3rd, Midwest | | |
| 2007 | 1 | WPSL | 1st, Midwest | Champions | National Final |
| 2008 | 1 | USL W-League | 1st, Midwest Division, Central Conference | National Final | Champions |
| 2009 | 2 | USL W-League | 1st, Midwest Division, Central Conference | Conference Final | |
| 2010 | | | | | |
| 2011 | 2 | WPSL | 2nd, South Division (Midwest Conference) | Midwest Semifinal | |
| 2011 | | WLS | 1st, Elite Division | | |
| 2012 | 2 | WPSL Elite | 8th | | |
| 2012 | | WLS | 1st | | |
| 2013 | | | | | |
| 2014 | 2 | WPSL | | Regional Finals | |
| 2015 | 2 | WPSL | 2nd, Great Lakes Division, Midwest Conference | | |
| 2016 | 2 | WPSL | 4th, Great Lakes Division | | |

== Honors ==
- USL W-League Central Conference Champions 2009
- US Open Cup Champions 2008
- USL W-League Regular Season Champions 2008
- USL W-League Central Conference Champions 2008
- USL W-League Midwest Division Champions 2008
- WPSL Champions 2007
- WPSL Midwest Conference Champions 2007
- US Open Cup Runners-up 2007
- WPSL Champions 2005
- WPSL Central Division Champions 2005
- US Open Cup Champions 2005
- Region 2 Champions 2005

== Stadiums ==
- Newton Park 2015–
- St. Joe Stadium 2013–2014
- IU Michael A. Carroll Track & Soccer Stadium 2012
- Kuntz Stadium 2007–2011
- Varsity Soccer Complex (Purdue University) 2007
- Goshen Soccer Park 2000–2006

== Average attendance ==
- 2015: 133
- 2014: 241
- 2013: 287
- 2012: 1,359
- 2011: 329
- 2010: NA
- 2009: 771
- 2008: 1,012
- 2007: 557
- 2006: 911
- 2005: 723
- 2004: 105

== Memorable moments ==
- July 11, 2004 – FC Indiana defeats Australia Women's National Team 1–0.
- July 19, 2005 – FC Indiana defeats Trinidad & Tobago Women's National Team 3–0.
- July 21, 2005 – FC Indiana defeats Trinidad & Tobago Women's National Team 8–3.
- July 31, 2005 – After winning 4–0 over host New England Mutiny, FC Indiana upsets the defending champions California Storm 5–4, winning the Women's Premier Soccer League national championship.
- August 6, 2005 – Six days after winning the Women's Premier Soccer League title, FC Indiana defeats the Dallas SC Titans 4–0 in the U.S. Open Cup national final, achieving the second "double" in American women's soccer history.
- July 29, 2007 – FC Indiana defeats the New England Mutiny 3–0 to win its second WPSL title in three years.
- August 15, 2007 – FC Indiana defeats New Zealand Women's National Team 1–0.

== See also ==
- F.C. Indiana (NPSL)
- United Women's Soccer
- Women's Premier Soccer League Elite
- Women's Premier Soccer League
- W-League
