= Wendy Dillinger =

American soccer player-coach

Personal information
- Full name: Wendy Marie Dillinger
- Date of birth: December 9, 1974 (age 51)
- Place of birth: St. Charles, Missouri, United States
- Height: 5 ft 7 in (1.70 m)
- Position: Midfielder

College career
Years	Team	Apps	(Gls)
1993–1997	Indiana Hoosiers		

Senior career*
Years	Team	Apps	(Gls)
1997–2000	Indiana Blaze	43	(19)
1998	Frederiksberg	5	(3)
2001	Atlanta Beat	0	(0)
2004	St. Louis Archers	6	(4)
Total		61	(29)

Managerial career
- 1998–2001: Indiana Hoosiers (assistant)
- 2002–2007: Washington University Bears
- 2008–2013: Iowa State Cyclones
- 2014–2019: UMSL Tritons
- * Club domestic league appearances and goals

Wendy Dillinger (born December 9, 1974) is an American former professional soccer player and coach. She served as the head soccer coach at Washington University in St. Louis, Iowa State University, and the University of Missouri–St. Louis, and as an assistant at Indiana University.

== Early life ==
Born in St. Charles, Missouri, to William and Dorothy Dillinger, Dillinger began her soccer career at age five playing in the backyard not long before she joined the CYC (Catholic Youth Council) St. Elizabeth Ann Seton team. From there she moved on to St. Cletus, Coke, Norco, Jamestown Stars and ended up with then national powerhouse JB Marine. She was a three-time Missouri State Cup Champion (once with Jamestown and twice with JB Marine) and in 1994 was named the Most Valuable Player of the U19 State Cup Final. In 1995, she won a silver medal with JB Marine in the U23 National Amateur Cup which was played in Indianapolis, Indiana.

Dillinger attended St. Charles West High School. She scored 100 career high school goals and led her team to the Missouri State High School Activities Association (MSHSAA) Final Four in 1992. She was named All-GAC (Gateway Athletic Conference) four years straight and named St. Louis All-Metro in 1992 and 1993. As a senior, she was twice named St. Charles Journal Athlete of the Week and received the St. Charles West Scholar Athlete Award, the St. Louis Post-Dispatch Scholar-Athlete Award and was named the Most Valuable Player of the 1993 St. Louis North-South All-Star Game. Dillinger also earned All-Conference honors in softball and led her team to a basketball district championship her senior year.

== College ==
Dillinger attended Indiana University from 1993–1997 (1996 redshirt) where she started 75 matches. She holds school career records for goals (37), assists (24), and points (98). She was a two-time first team All-Big Ten selection in 1994 and 1997. Dillinger also earned All-Region recognition in 1993 (All-Central), 1994 (All-Mid East) and 1997 (All-Great Lakes). Her 13 goals in 1993 mark the second-highest single-season total. She tallied eight assists in each of the 1993 and 1997 seasons, a mark that is tied for first in school history (Carrie Watts 1998). Her efforts make her the first player ever at Indiana to record three multi-goal games in one season. She also holds the school record with eight total multi-goal games. Dillinger, a biology major, received Academic All-Big Ten laurels in 1994–95.

In 1993, women's soccer competed as a varsity sport for the first time in the history of Indiana University. Dillinger scored 13 goals for the Hoosiers, five of which were game winners and added eight assists on 61 shots. She led the Hoosiers in every offensive category. Only two Hoosiers have tallied three assists in a single game, Dillinger against Detroit on September 8, and Megan Pipkens in a 3–0 win over Oakland on September 30, 2004. On October 31, Dillinger scored twice and Sheryl Mansberger added another goal as the women's soccer team beat UW-Green Bay, 3–1, to cap a nine-game winning streak and finish Indiana's first varsity season with a 12–6–0 record.

In 1994, in the Big Ten's inaugural season and Indiana's first Big Ten match, Dillinger scored three against the Northwestern Wildcats on September 9, the first of only six Indiana hat tricks in program history. On September 14, Dillinger scored two goals against Louisville in a span of 70 seconds to set a school record for quickest back-to-back goals.

In 1995, Dillinger was named Big Ten Player of the Week and to the Soccer America Team of the Week after a 1–0 win against Wisconsin on October 8 in which she scored the game-winning goal. Dillinger played in all 19 matches and scored four goals on 27 shots. In 1996, she was redshirted.

In 1997, Dillinger tied a school record with eight assists on top of nine goals. During the first weekend of play, she earned the Nike/Butler University Kick-off Classic Tournament Most Valuable Player. Dillinger's final career point came in the form of an assist in her final regular season match against Kentucky when she connected with Kris Fosdick in the 36th minute for the game winner.

== Professional ==
=== Indiana Blaze ===
Dillinger's senior career began with the W-League's Indiana Blaze in 1997 where she played through 2000. In 1997, Dillinger started nine games in which she recorded three goals and two assists. In 1998, she started the final two games of the season after returning from Denmark. Dillinger played a leading role in helping the Blaze win the Central Conference and advance to the W-2 Final Four in 2000 where they finished third overall. In July 1999, she was named to the W-League Team of the Week alongside Charmaine Hooper of the Chicago Cobras.

=== Fredericksburg Boldklub ===
In the summer of 1998, Dillinger headed to Europe to play professionally for Denmark's Fredericksburg Boldklub. She scored three goals and added three assists in five games to help Fredericksburg advance to the Elite Division.

=== Atlanta Beat ===
In February 2000, the Women's United Soccer Association (WUSA) was founded by John S. Hendricks. Dillinger was invited to the week-long combine held at Florida Atlantic University in Boca Raton, Florida December 5–9, 2000, during which 200 invitation-only players got the chance to participate in games and drills. During this combine, Dillinger recorded the first official WUSA penalty kick. Dillinger was not selected in the initial draft; however, she did receive invitations to try out for the Atlanta Beat and Carolina Courage in February 2001. She attended the Beat's invitation-only tryout which took place on the campus of Emory University February 15–18 and consisted of 19 invitees from around the country. On February 19, the Atlanta Beat finalized their pre-season roster of 28 which included the addition of Dillinger along with Suzanne Eastman, Charry Korgel and Sarah Reading. March 1 marked the beginning of a month-long pre-season in which the 28-player roster trained at Bobby Dodd Stadium on Georgia Tech's campus.

On March 28, 2001, the Atlanta Beat defeated the San Diego Spirit 2–0 and moved to 8–0–1 in pre-season play. Dillinger scored the first goal from the penalty spot. By the end of pre-season, Dillinger led the Beat in scoring with four goals. On April 2 WUSA rosters were cut from 28 to 20 and the Atlanta Beat announced their final roster which included Dillinger as well as FIFA co-Player of the Century Sun Wen. Three weeks following the Beat's season opener, Dillinger was released. Upon returning home, Dillinger underwent knee surgery. She was one of three Indiana Hoosiers to play during the inaugural WUSA season along with Tracy Grose, Carolina Courage and Kelly Wilson, Bay Area CyberRays.

=== St. Louis Archers ===
In 2004, Dillinger concluded her playing career as player-coach for the W-League's St. Louis Archers. She tallied four goals and three assists in six games. Dillinger officially retired in April 2005 after a patellar realignment.

== Coaching ==
=== Indiana University ===
Dillinger served as the women's soccer assistant coach at her alma mater Indiana University under Head Coach Joe Kelley for four seasons (1998–2001). During her tenure, she helped guide the Hoosiers to 35 wins, including an NCAA Tournament berth and the first NCAA Tournament win in school history in 1998.

=== Washington University in St. Louis ===
Dillinger was head coach of the Washington University in St. Louis women's soccer team from 2002 until 2007. In six seasons on the Danforth Campus, Dillinger guided Washington University to an 86–25–8 overall record. She ranked 14th among active Division III coaches, winning 75.6 percent of her games.

In her first year as a head coach, Dillinger guided the Bears to a 10–5–3 record (10–2–3 vs Division III opponents), including a 3–2–2 mark in the UAA. Three Washington University athletes were named to the All-UAA Second Team, ten student-athletes earned Academic All-UAA Honors, and three were named Academic All-District.

In 2003, Dillinger led WU to a 14–3–3 mark, and won the second UAA championship in school history. Twelve Washington University student-athletes earned Academic All-UAA Honors, two of whom were named ESPN the Magazine Academic All-Americans. They were UAA Champions and named UAA Coaching Staff of the Year. The Bears finished with an NSCAA Final National Ranking of 18th.

In 2004, Dillinger and the Bears posted a 17–3–1 mark and advanced to the Sectional Finals for the third time in school history before falling 0–3 to No. 6 University of Puget Sound. They won their third overall UAA Title and second under Dillinger and finished 12th in the final NSCAA National Rankings.

In 2005, the Bears finished 11–7–1 (3–4–0 in UAA) outscoring opposition 32–12. Three players earned All-UAA recognition. In 2006, The Bears tied the school record for wins with a 17–3 overall record, including a 7–0 record in University Athletic Association (UAA) play, while outscoring their opponents 56–9. Dillinger and her staff were awarded UAA Coaching Staff of the Year honors after capturing the UAA title and advancing to the NCAA Sectional Semi-Finals before falling to Washington & Lee 1–2. Twelve student-athletes earned Academic All-UAA Honors. The Bears finished the season ranked 11th according to the NSCAA Final Poll.

In 2007, Washington University advanced to the NCAA Sectional Round for the third time under Dillinger before falling to No. 3 TCNJ 0–1. Again tying a school record with 17 wins, the Bears finished with a final record of 17–4. For the fourth time in six years, Dillinger guided her team to a UAA Championship. The Bears finished 9th in the NSCAA Final National Rankings.

=== Iowa State University ===
On January 24, 2008, senior associate athletics director Calli Sanders announced Dillinger as the women's soccer new head coach of the Iowa State Cyclones. She recorded her first win with the Cyclones at DePaul University on Friday, September 5, 2008 in a 3–1 victory. Dillinger also captured her 100th career win as a head coach on August 22, 2010 against Northern Iowa by a tally of 3–1.

In 2008, Dillinger's first season as head coach of the Cyclones, the team had a final overall record of 5–12–2 (0–8–2 Big 12) including wins against two in-state rivals Drake and Northern Iowa. Seven players were named Academic All-Big 12, two of whom were named CoSIDA District VII Academic All- Americans. The women's soccer team captured the Cyclone Challenge Cup for community service.

The 2009 season saw steady improvement with a 7–9–4 overall record (2–8–0 Big 12) including wins over No. 20 DePaul, Oklahoma State, Texas and Northern Iowa. Nine players in all were named to the Academic All-Big 12 Team. For the second consecutive year, the soccer program was recognized for their work in the community by winning the Cyclone Challenge Cup.

In 2010, the Cyclones finished 8–10–2 (3–7–0 Big 12). The Cyclones produced eight shutouts on the season and fell on one goal losses to No. 8 Oklahoma State and in overtime to No. 7 Texas A&M. Seven players were named to the Academic All-Big 12 team.

In 2011, the Cyclones finished the season with an even 9–9–1 (2–6 Big 12) and set a season record for shutouts holding nine opponents scoreless including wins over No. 23 Washington and Texas Tech. The season also included a last second 0–1 loss to No. 2 Oklahoma State as well as a 1–0 win in what would be the Missouri Tigers last ever Big 12 match. The Cyclones ended the year with an RPI ranking of 78th in the nation. A program best 13 players were named to the Academic All-Big 12 Team.

In 2012, the Cyclones ended even again at 10–10–0 (1–7–0 Big 12). They recorded another seven shutouts while dropping four one-goal losses to ranked opponents. The soccer program was recognized with the Cyclone Service Team Award while posting a league-high 18 players to the Academic All-Big 12 Team.

In 2013, the Cyclones broke the 0.500 barrier and qualified for the Big 12 Conference Tournament for the first time since 2007. Their fourth place Big 12 finish was the second highest in program history, finishing the season 9–8–2 (3–4–1 Big 12). However, Dillinger was relieved of her coaching duties on November 3, 2013; and the Cyclones lost to Baylor 0–1 in the Big 12 Tournament under Interim Coach Tony Minatta. Out of a possible 15 eligible upperclassmen, 14 were named to the Academic All-Big 12 Team.

=== University of Missouri - St. Louis ===
Dillinger was named the head women's soccer coach at the University of Missouri-St. Louis on December 19, 2013. Dillinger joined former Indiana Hoosier and men's coach Dan King. Dillinger's first Triton win was a 3-0 victory over Waldorf College at Don Dallas Stadium on September 5, 2014.

In 2014, Dillinger's first season as head coach, the Tritonss record was 8-8-1 (6-8-1 GLVC). The Tritons earned the NSCAA College Team Academic Award for its work in the classroom.

In 2015, the Tritons posted the most wins since 2007 finishing with an overall record of 12-5-4 (8-3-4 GLVC) and returned to the NCAA Tournament for the first time in 32 years. Fall 2015 also saw the induction of former UMSL All-Americans Jan Gettermeyer Sansone and Joan Gettemeyer into the St. Louis Soccer Hall of Fame. The Tritons recognized the two for their contribution to the soccer community on October 23 after tying #18 Bellarmine 2-2. The Tritons finished the regular season in 4th securing a home field first round conference tournament game where they defeated fifth seed Drury University 2-1. The Tritons advanced to the GLVC Championship after besting top-seeded Bellarmine 2-1, but lost to Truman State in the Championship Final 0-1. They then received an at-large bid to the NCAA Tournament, travelling to Grand Valley State University where they lost 0-1 to rival Quincy despite outshooting the Hawks 21-9.

In 2016, the Tritons again secured an at-large bid to participate in the NCAA Division II Women's Soccer Tournament, after finishing third in the Great Lakes Valley Conference regular season (13-5-1 GLVC 11-3-1). The Triton side dropped five matches to #2 Grand Valley State, #8 Bellarmine, #15 Rockhurst (twice) and unranked Indianapolis while drawing even with #19 Truman State and revenging two earlier losses against #12 Rockhurst in the first round of the NCAA Tournament. Six players earned All-Great Lakes Valley Conference honors. Freshman goalkeeper Emily Rish was named the GLVC Women's Soccer Defensive Player of the Week after posting a pair of shutouts, holding No. 19 Truman State and Quincy scoreless for 200 minutes. The Triton squad recorded the most wins in program history since 2003 and notched the program its first NCAA win since 1982. In March 2017, former Triton Kirsten Crabtree signed with Skovde KIK in the Sweden Women’s Professional Soccer League, becoming the first UMSL alumnae to play professionally overseas. In June 2017, the GLVC announced that two members, Miranda Buettner and Miriam Taylor, were distinguished with the Council of Presidents' Academic Excellence Award, and sport-high twelve players were named to the Academic All-GLVC Team.

In 2017, Dillinger's squad fell below the 0.500 mark, and consequently did not qualify for post-season play (5-7-4 GLVC 4-7-3). The Tritons finished in a five-way tie for ninth place in the Great Lakes Valley Conference. Off the field, the Tritons partnered with Missouri Youth Soccer Association and Jennings School District to forge youth grassroots developmental soccer program. The project was awarded a US Soccer 'Innovate to Grow' Grant to expand the program.

=== Coaching History ===
Year-by-Year with Wendy Dillinger
Year	Institution	Overall	Conference	NCAA
1998	Indiana University (assistant)	14–8–1	6–3–0	Second round
1999	Indiana University (assistant)	5–8–6	2–4–4	DNQ
2000	Indiana University (assistant)	8–9–1	1–8–1	DNQ
2001	Indiana University (assistant)	8–7–2	3–6–1	DNQ
2002	Washington University in St. Louis	10–5–3	3–2–2 (4th)	DNQ
2003	Washington University in St. Louis	14–3–3	5–1–1 (1st)	Second Round
2004	Washington University in St. Louis	17–3–1	6–1–0 (1st)	Quarter-Finals
2005	Washington University in St. Louis	11–7–1	3–4–0 (4th)	DNQ
2006	Washington University in St. Louis	17–3–0	7–0–0 (1st)	Sectional Semi-Final
2007	Washington University in St. Louis	17–4–0	5–2–0 (1st)	Sectional Semi-Final
2008	Iowa State University	5–12–2	0–8–2 (11th)	DNQ (RPI 197)
2009	Iowa State University	7–9–4	2–8–0 (11th)	DNQ (RPI 164)
2010	Iowa State University	8–10–2	3–7–0 (10th)	DNQ (RPI 108)
2011	Iowa State University	9–9–1	2–6–0 (8th)	DNQ (RPI 78)
2012	Iowa State University	10–10–0	1–7–0 (9th)	DNQ (RPI 115)
2013	Iowa State University	9–8–2	3–4–1 (4th)	DNQ (RPI 127)
2014	University of Missouri - St. Louis	8–8–1	6–8–1 (9th)	DNQ
2015	University of Missouri - St. Louis	12–5–4	8–3–4 (4th)	First Round
2016	University of Missouri - St. Louis	13-5-1	11-3-1 (3rd)	Second Round (RV)
2017	University of Missouri - St. Louis	5-7-4	4-7-3 (T-9th)	DNQ
2018	University of Missouri - St. Louis	3-12-1	2-10-1 (13th)	DNQ
2019	University of Missouri - St. Louis	5-11-1	5-9-1 (12th)	DNQ
	Totals as Head Coach	180–131–31	74–80–16

=== Camps, Clubs, and Clinics ===
Dillinger serves as the Director of Triton Soccer Camps which specializes in high school aged identification and youth development. Previously she served as the director of Cyclone Soccer Camps LLC in Ames, Iowa for six years, hosting over 500 campers on the Iowa State University campus. She spent 14 consecutive summers as a member of the camp staff at Indiana University Soccer Camps and has also helped with camps at Washington University, IUPUI, Northern Arizona University, St. Louis University, University of Missouri and West Virginia Wesleyan University.

While in Missouri and Indiana, Dillinger coached USYSA teams from Scott Gallagher MR (U8, U9, U10), Lou Fusz (U17), Missouri Rush (U10, U11), Bayern Munchkin (U7), JB Marine (U17, U18), Junior Hoosiers FC (U14, U16, U19), Bloomington Cutters (U12) and Center Grove SC (U12, U14, U17). In the spring of 2017, Dillinger was named Head Coach of the WPSL Fire & Ice Reserves Team.

Dillinger earned her NSCAA National Diploma in January 2000 at Nova Southeastern University. She has been a member of the NSCAA since 1998 and has attended NSCAA Annual Conventions in Baltimore, Indianapolis, Kansas City, Philadelphia, St. Louis and Charlotte.
