= Women's Premier Soccer League Canada =

Proposed semi-professional soccer league

- Founded: 2021; 5 years ago
- Country: Canada
- Confederation: CONCACAF
- Divisions: Canada East, Canada West
- Level on pyramid: 2 (proposed)

The Women's Premier Soccer League Canada (WPSL Canada) was a proposed semi-professional women's soccer league in Canada. In 2021, it announced plans to begin play as a division 2 league, which would have made it the top league for women's soccer in the Canadian soccer league system at the time.

Development of the proposed league was put on hold in 2023 following the Northern Super League's announced plan of launching a fully professional Canadian women's soccer league in 2025.

== League structure ==
The league shared plans to operate in two conferences: Canada West and Canada East. Clubs would have played matches each season against other clubs in their respective conferences, followed by conference playoffs and a national championship.

The league would have worked with a limited partnership model as opposed to a membership model. Clubs that bought into the league would have received votes and financial incentives in a similar way that the Canadian Premier League teams have a stake in Canada Soccer Business.

The WPSL Canada's leadership group consisted of Santiago Almada, Sam Bacso, and the US-based WPSL organization. The league stated a desire to establish a foundation for women's soccer in Canada to attract further investment for a future professional division.

== Teams ==
The league announced that all clubs would have been held to a high National 2 license standard supplied by Canadian Soccer Association (CSA). These standards would have assured that all clubs in the league met requirements in all categories to qualify to successfully participate in the league. These standards would have included financial, infrastructure, technical and sporting, administrative, governance, and legal criteria.

The league hinted at teams representing Toronto, Montreal, Calgary, and Vancouver as launch cities, however full details for launch clubs in those metropolitan areas were not announced. Sam Basco separately confirmed that Calgary would have a team in the league.

== Reception ==
"Imagine asking any of the players in this video to come home to Canada to play in a league which is:
- 2.5month season
- Semi-pro
- Second-Tier
- Level below NWSL
It has its place... but this is not what we are fighting for."

— Stephanie Labbé, December 8, 2021

The announcement of the proposed league was met with mixed reactions. While some players applauded WPSL Canada for creating new domestic opportunities for Canadians, others, including then Canada women's national soccer team player Stephanie Labbé and former player Amy Walsh, criticized the proposed league for not "answering the call" for a fully professional Canadian league. Several analysts also shared their skepticism at the announcement.
