= Annelie Leitner =

Austrian footballer (born 1996)

Personal information
- Date of birth: 15 June 1996 (age 30)
- Place of birth: Graz, Austria
- Height: 1.70 m (5 ft 7 in)
- Position: Forward

Team information
- Current team: Eibar
- Number: 21

Youth career
- 2004–200?: SC Tamsweg
- 2006–200?: 1. SSK 1919
- 2013: ASV Ofenbinder Spratzern

College career
Years	Team	Apps	(Gls)
2014–2018	Indiana Hoosiers	75	(9)

Senior career*
Years	Team	Apps	(Gls)
20??–2012	Pares-Unifut		
2013	St. Pölten	3	(2)
2013	St. Pölten II	1	(0)
2013	Pares-Unifut		
201?–201?	Indiana Invaders		
2019	Hwacheon KSPO WFC		
2020	Maccabi Kishronot Hadera	7	(2)
2020–2022	Zaragoza	54	(10)
2022–2023	DUX Logroño	30	(1)
2023–	Eibar	6	(0)

International career^{‡}
2012–2013	Austria U17	6	(2)
2013–2015	Austria U19	7	(3)
2021–	Austria	1	(0)
- * Club domestic league appearances and goals as of 23 October 2023 ‡ National team caps and goals as of 14 June 2021.

Annelie Leitner (born 15 June 1996) is an Austrian professional footballer who plays as a forward for Spanish Liga F club Eibar and the Austria women's national team.

== Early life ==
Leitner was born to Austrian parents in Graz and grew up in Salzburg. In 2009, she emigrated to Guatemala because of her father's work.

== Education and college career ==
Leitner has attended the Guatemalan Austrian Institute in Guatemala City and the Indiana University Bloomington in Bloomington, Indiana, United States.

== Club career ==
Leitner is a SC Tamsweg and 1. SSK 1919 product. After moving to Guatemala, she has played for Pares-Unifut. During her time in the United States as an Indiana University Bloomington student, she also played for Indiana Invaders in the WLS. After graduation, she was signed by Hwacheon KSPO WFC in South Korea. She later played for Maccabi Kishronot Hadera FC in Israel and for Zaragoza CFF in Spain.

== International career ==
At youth levels, Leitner has first played unofficially for Guatemala, while living there, and then officially for Austria. She made her senior debut for the latter on 14 June 2021 as an 82nd-minute substitution in a 2–3 friendly home defeat to Italy.
