= Collins Tanor =

Ghanaian footballer (born 1998)

Personal information
- Full name: Collins Tanor
- Date of birth: 4 January 1998 (age 28)
- Place of birth: Brong-Ahafo, Ghana
- Height: 1.75 m (5 ft 9 in)
- Position: Midfielder

Youth career
- 2007–2015: Right to Dream
- 2015–2016: Manchester City

Senior career*
Years	Team	Apps	(Gls)
2016–2020	Manchester City	0	(0)
2016–2018	→ Nordsjælland (loan)	9	(0)
2018	→ Beerschot Wilrijk (loan)	2	(0)
2018–2019	→ Hobro (loan)	2	(0)
2019	→ Thisted (loan)	12	(0)
2021	Shukura Kobuleti	6	(0)
2022	South Bend Lions	10	(1)
2023–2024	Stratford Town	0	(0)
2024	→ FC Stratford (dual reg.)	2	(0)
2024	→ Hereford (dual reg.)	0	(0)
2024	FC Stratford	7	(2)
2024	→ Spalding United (dual reg.)	1	(0)

International career
- Ghana U-17
- * Club domestic league appearances and goals as of 18:08, 30 November 2024 (UTC)

Collins Tanor (born 4 January 1998 in Brong-Ahafo, Ghana) is a Ghanaian footballer who plays as a midfielder.

== Early career ==
Coming from Brong-Ahafo of Ghana, Tanor started out at the Right to Dream Academy since joining on a student-athlete scholarship at the age of 10. During his time at the academy, Collins captained the Ghana U17s – leading them to a four-nation tournament victory in 2014. He also guided the RtD Academy U18s to a second successive victory in the Gothia Cup in Sweden. In 2014, Tanor played in the Al Kass U17 International Cup in Qatar with Manchester City U17.

As a result, he would train and eventually sign with the club.

== Club career ==
=== FC Nordsjælland (loan) ===
On 28 January 2016 it was confirmed, that Tanor had signed a season long loan deal with Danish Superliga-side FC Nordsjælland. He started the first five months at the club, playing for the reserve side.

Tanor got his FC Nordsjælland debut on 9 May 2016, where he played 45 minutes, before getting replaced by Godsway Donyoh in a 1–2 defeat against Brøndby IF in the Danish Superliga. He went on to make two appearances at the end of the 2015–16 season.

In the 2016–17 season, Tanor started the whole game, where the club beat AB Taarnby 4–1 in the second round of the Danish Cup. However, Tanor only played two matches in the start of the 2016–17 season as a substitute, due to problems with his stomach. He was diagnosed with sport hernia in his stomach, and was out for six months following an operation. He made his rehabilitation in Manchester, before returning to Denmark. After he returned in April 2017, he began playing for the U19 squad. He was for example with the U19 squad in Düsseldorf, where they played a friendly tournament. It wasn't until 29 May 2017 when he made his return to the first team, coming on as a second-half substitute, in a 2–1 win over Brøndby IF in the last game of the league's Championship round.

In the 2017–18 season, Tanor started out playing in the reserve side for most of the first half of the season and struggled to make a breakthrough in the first team. As a result, on 31 January 2018, FCN terminated the loan deal with midfielder.

=== KFCO Beerschot Wilrijk (loan) ===
After his two-years loan spell at FC Nordsjælland came to an end, Tanor left Manchester City when he joined KFCO Beerschot Wilrijk on a loan-contract until the end of this season, with an option for another year.

Tanor made his KFCO Beerschot Wilrijk debut, where he came on as a substitute later in the second-half, as they drew 1–1 against Oud-Heverlee Leuven on 16 February 2018.

=== Hobro IK (loan) ===
On 31 August 2018, Hobro IK announced, that they had signed Tanor on a loan-contract for the rest of the season.

=== Thisted FC (loan) ===
Tanor and Hobro interrupted the loan deal, and was loaned out to Thisted FC instead, for the rest of the season.

=== South Bend Lions ===
After a spell at Georgian club Shukura Kobuleti in 2021, Tanor was without club for almost a year, before joining American USL League Two side South Bend Lions in July 2022.

=== Return to English football ===
Tanor registered with Southern League Premier Division Central club Stratford Town in August 2023. He had yet to play for Stratford Town until January 2024, when he suddenly found himself playing for their tenants FC Stratford in Hellenic Division One. He played 90 minutes against Tytherington Rocks, a couple of minutes in a canceled match and 83 minutes against Calne Town, on 6 and 13 January 2024, respectively. Therefore, it appeared that Tanor was playing for FC Stratford on dual registration.

On 23 January 2024, Tanor joined National League North club Hereford on dual registration from Southern League Premier Division Central club Stratford Town. He was on the bench for Hereford on 27 January 2024 against Darlington. However, it is unclear if he came on the pitch.

On 30 January, Tanor was again on FC Stratford's team sheet in a match against Paget Rangers. On 6 February 2024, he appeared for Spalding United in a Lincolnshire Senior Cup semi-final fixture against Boston United. After this match for Spalding, Tanor was back on FC Stratford's roster in February and March 2024.

== Playing style ==
Tanor's playing style is described as "a great talent who loves to control the game. He can either play as number 6 or 8 in the midfield. He is very energetic and thoughtful in his episodes."
