= Rhode Island Rays =

Rhode Island Rays was an American women's soccer team, founded in XXXX. The team was a member of the Women's Premier Soccer League, the third tier of women's soccer in the United States and Canada, until 2006, when the team left the league and the franchise was terminated.

The team played its home games at...

The team's colors were...

== Year-by-year ==
Year	Division	League	Reg. season	Playoffs
2005	2	WPSL	6th, East	
2006	2	WPSL	8th, East North	
