= Austin-Tindall Regional Park =

Athletic facility in Kissimmee, Florida

Coordinates: 28.332205272239747°N 81.27865678453041°W

Austin-Tindall Regional Park is an athletic facility located in Kissimmee, Florida, encompassing 115 acres (0.47 km^{2}) of active and passive recreational area 9.5 miles (15.3 km) from the Orlando International Airport. It hosts annual soccer, football, lacrosse and rugby events, as well as field hockey and archery matches.

Now in April 2025, Soccer club, Nona FC are using the complex for soccer practices and matches.
