= Adirondack Lynx =

American women's soccer team

- Full name: Adirondack Lynx
- Nickname: Lynx
- Founded: 2005
- Stadium: Skidmore College Stadium
- Chairman: (United States) PJ Motsiff
- Manager: (United States) PJ Motsiff
- League: Women's Premier Soccer League
- 2008: 6th, East North Division
Home colors	Away colors

Adirondack Lynx is an American women’s soccer team, founded in 2005. The team is a member of the Women's Premier Soccer League, the third tier of women’s soccer in the United States and Canada. The team plays in the North Division of the East Conference.

The team plays its home games in the stadium on the campus of Skidmore College in Saratoga Springs, New York. The club's colors are: gold, green, white and black.

== Year-by-year ==
Year	Division	League	Reg. season	Playoffs
2006 * WPSL East North Division Champions 2006	2	WPSL	1st, East North	
2007	2	WPSL	4th, East North	Did not qualify
2008	2	WPSL	6th, East North	Did not qualify

== Honors ==
- WPSL East North Division Champions 2006

== Coaches ==
- (United States) PJ Motsiff 2006–present

== Stadium ==
- Stadium at Skidmore College, Saratoga Springs, New York -present
