= Atlantic City Diablos (WPSL) =

- Full name: Atlantic City Diablos
- Nickname: The Diablos
- Founded: 2005
- Ground: St. Augustine Prep School
- Capacity: 6,200
- Chairman: Matt Driver
- Manager: Stuart Gore
- League: Women's Premier Soccer League
- 2008: 3rd, East Mid-Atlantic Division
Home colors	Away colors

The Atlantic City Diablos are an American professional soccer team based in Richland, New Jersey, United States. Founded in 2005, the team plays in Women's Premier Soccer League (WPSL), a national amateur league at the fourth tier of the American Soccer Pyramid.

The Diablos' home is the St. Augustine College Preparatory School's athletic stadium, located in the Atlantic City suburb of Richland, where they have played since 2007. The team is owned by Team Dynamics LLC, a highly successful organization dedicated to soccer education and player development at all age levels. Team Dynamics LLC also maintains a team in the National Premier Soccer League (NPSL), also called the Atlantic City Diablos. The team's colors are blue, gold, and white.

== Year-by-year ==
Year	Division	League	Reg. season	Playoffs
2006	2	WPSL	1st, East South	
2007	2	WPSL	1st, East Mid-Atlantic	Conference Finals
2008	2	WPSL	3rd, East Mid-Atlantic	Did not qualify

== Honors ==
- WPSL East Mid-Atlantic Division Champions 2007
- WPSL East South Division Champions 2006

== Head coaches ==
- (United States) Matt Driver (2006–2008)
- (England) Stuart Gore (2008-2010)

== Home stadiums ==
- St. Augustine College Preparatory School (2008–present)
