= Albuquerque Lady Asylum =

- Full name: Albuquerque Lady Asylum Football Club
- Nickname: Lady Asylum
- Founded: 2006
- Dissolved: 2008
- Ground: Menaul School Stadium
- Chairman: (United States) Opal Stalls
- Manager: (United States) Peter Clinch
- League: Women's Premier Soccer League
- 2008: 3rd, Big Sky North Division
| Home colors | Away colors |

Albuquerque Lady Asylum was an American women's soccer team, founded in 2006. The team was a member of the Women's Premier Soccer League, the third tier of women's soccer in the United States and Canada. The team plays in the North Division of the Big Sky Conference. The team folded after the 2008 season.

The team played its home games in the stadium on the grounds of Menaul School in Albuquerque, New Mexico. The club's colors was sky blue, black and white.

The team was a sister organization of the men's Albuquerque Asylum team, which plays in the National Premier Soccer League.

== Year-by-year ==
| Year | Division | League | Reg. season | Playoffs |
|---|---|---|---|---|
| 2007 | 2 | WPSL | 4th, Southern Southwest | Did not qualify |
| 2008 | 2 | WPSL | 3rd, Big Sky North | Did not qualify |

== Coaches ==
- (England) Peter Clinch 2007–2008

== Stadia ==
- Stadium at Menaul School, Albuquerque, New Mexico 2007–2008
