= Orlando Falcons =

- Full name: Orlando Falcons
- Nickname: Falcons
- Founded: 2005
- Ground: Austin-Tindall Regional Park
- Capacity: 1,500
- Manager: (Jamaica) Ken Hammond
- League: Women's Premier Soccer League
Home colors	Away colors

Orlando Falcons were an American women's soccer team based in Kissimmee, Florida, in the Greater Orlando area. The team was founded in 2004. The Falcons were a member of the Women's Premier Soccer League, the third tier of women's soccer in the United States and Canada. The team played in the Sunshine Conference.

The team played its home games at the Austin-Tindall Regional Park in Kissimmee, Florida. The club's colors were white, red and black in varying combinations.

== Year-by-year ==
Year	Division	League	Reg. season	Playoffs
2006	2	WPSL	4th, Southern South	
2007	2	WPSL	4th, Southern South	Did not qualify
