= Cleveland Internationals Women =

American women's soccer team

- Full name: Cleveland Internationals Soccer
- Nickname: Internationals
- Founded: 2004; 22 years ago
- Stadium: Pinnacle Sports Complex
- Chairman: Earl Salter
- Manager: Zdravko Popovich
- League: Women's Major League Soccer
Home colours	Away colours

The Cleveland International Women are an American women's soccer team, founded in 2004. The team is a member of the Women's League Soccer (WLS), a new and alternative women's soccer league in the United States that uses an open league model of promotion and relegation to compete globally.

Home games are played in Pinnacle Sports Complex stadium in Medina, Ohio, 35 miles south of Cleveland. The team's colors are red, white and blue.

The team is a sister organization of the men's Cleveland Internationals team, which plays in the USL Premier Development League.

== Players ==
=== Current roster ===
Note: Flags indicate national team as defined under FIFA eligibility rules; some limited exceptions apply. Players may hold more than one non-FIFA nationality.

No.	Pos.	Nation	Player
0	GK	USA	Carianne Betts
1	GK	BRA	Priscilla Mayla Campanha
2	DF	USA	Renee Balconi
4	MF	USA	Julia Victor
5	DF	USA	Kerri Krawczak
7	MF	USA	Rosemarie Augustin
8	DF	USA	Becky Imhoff
9	MF	USA	Alyxandra Portier
11	MF	USA	Lynnea Pappas
12	MF	USA	Jessica Rostedt
14	DF	USA	Amy Graeff
17	FW	USA	Lisa Grubb
18	MF	USA	Courtney Rosen
19	MF	USA	Allie Riczo

No.	Pos.	Nation	Player
20	DF	BRA	Juliana Povoa
21	MF	USA	Kay Young
23	FW	USA	Paige Maxwell
24	FW	USA	Danielle Hubka
25	MF	USA	Kate Allen
26	MF	USA	Valerie Prause
27	MF	USA	Sarah Zawie
28	GK	USA	Jessica Schein
30	MF	USA	Cathryn Ford
31	DF	USA	Taylor Knaak
32	MF	USA	Juliana Libertin
—	MF	USA	Micaela Alvarez
—	MF	USA	Jill Ferree

=== Notable former players ===
- (United States) Danesha Adams
- (United States) Amanda Cinalli

== Year-by-year ==
Year	Division	League	Reg. season	Playoffs
2004	1	USL W-League	4th, Midwest	
2005	1	USL W-League	2nd, Midwest	Conference Semifinals
2006	1	USL W-League	3rd, Midwest	Did not qualify
2007	1	USL W-League	3rd, Midwest	Did not qualify
2008	1	USL W-League	4th, Midwest	Did not qualify

== Average attendance ==
Year	Attendance	Notes
2004	129	
2005	134	
2006	148	
2007	129	
2008	97	
All Time	127	
