= Northampton Laurels =

- Full name: Northampton Laurels Football Club
- Nickname: Laurels
- Founded: 2005
- Ground: J. Birney Crum Stadium, Allentown, Pennsylvania, U.S.
- Capacity: 15,000
- Chairman: (Trinidad and Tobago) Andy Salandy
- Manager: (Trinidad and Tobago) Anthony Creece
- League: Women's Premier Soccer League
- 2008: 6th, East Mid-Atlantic Division
Home colors	Away colors

The Northampton Laurels FC was an American professional soccer team based in Allentown, Pennsylvania. Founded in 2005, the team played in Women's Premier Soccer League (WPSL). The team folded after the 2008 season.

The Laurels' home was J. Birney Crum Stadium, located in the city of Allentown, where they had played since 2006. The team's colors were green and white.

== History ==
The team featured several players with previous professional and international experience, along with local stand out talent.

In their 2006 expansion season, the Laurels were the WPSL's Eastern Conference - Southern Division runners up. In addition, the team was a semi-finalist in the 2006 WPSL Eastern Conference Playoffs. The Laurels were also the WPSL Eastern Conference Mid-Atlantic Division runners up in 2007, and an Eastern Conference Semi-Finalist.

== Year-by-year ==
Year	Division	League	Reg. season	Playoffs
2006	2	WPSL	2nd, East South	
2007	2	WPSL	2nd, East Mid-Atlantic	Conference Semi-Finals
2008	2	WPSL	6th, East Mid-Atlantic	Did not qualify

== Head coaches ==
- (England) Wayne Grocott (2006)
- (Trinidad and Tobago) Anthony Creece (2007–2008)

== Home stadiums ==
- J. Birney Crum Stadium (2006–2008)
