= Long Island Fury =

- Full name: Long Island Fury
- Nickname: Fury
- Founded: 2005
- Stadium: Mitchel Athletic Complex
- Capacity: 9,969
- Chairman: Terry Uelleudahl
- Manager: Paul Riley
- League: Women's Premier Soccer League
- 2008: 1st, East Mid-Atlantic Division; Playoff Conference Semi Finals
Home colors	Away colors

Long Island Fury is an American women's soccer team, founded in 2005. The team is a member of the Women's Premier Soccer League, the second tier of women's soccer in the United States and Canada. The team plays in the Mid-Atlantic Division of the East Conference.

The team plays its home games at the Mitchel Athletic Complex in Uniondale, New York. The club's colors are red and navy blue.

The team is a sister organization of the men's Long Island Academy team, which plays in the National Premier Soccer League.

== Players ==
=== Notable former players ===
The following former Fury players have played at the senior international and/or professional level:

- Michelle Betos
- Maia Cabrera
- Marie Curtin
- Christina DiMartino
- Gina DiMartino
- Allie Long
- Rebecca Moros
- Alex Singer
- Sue Weber

== Year-by-year ==
Year	Division	League	Reg. season	Playoffs
2006	2	WPSL	2nd, East North	Champions
2007	2	WPSL	2nd, East North	Conference Semi-Finals
2008	2	WPSL	1st, East Mid-Atlantic	Conference Semi Finals

== Honors ==
- WPSL East Mid-Atlantic Division Champions 2008
- WPSL Champions 2006

== Coaches ==
- (England) Paul Riley 2006–2008

== Stadia ==
- Mitchel Athletic Complex, Uniondale, New York 2008–present
- Kings Point 2008 (3 games)
- Michael Tully Field New Hyde Park, New York 2008 (1 game)

== See also ==
- New York Fury
