= River Cities Futbol Club =

Rivers Cities FC
- Full name: River Cities Futbol Club
- Nickname: RCFC
- Founded: 2004
- Dissolved: 2007
- League: WPSL
Home colours	Away colours

River Cities FC was an American women's soccer team, founded in 2004. The team was a member of the Women's Premier Soccer League, the third tier of women's soccer in the United States and Canada, until 2007, when the team left the league and the franchise was terminated. The team played its home games in a stadium in Edwardsville, Illinois.

They used to be called the St. Louis Archers.

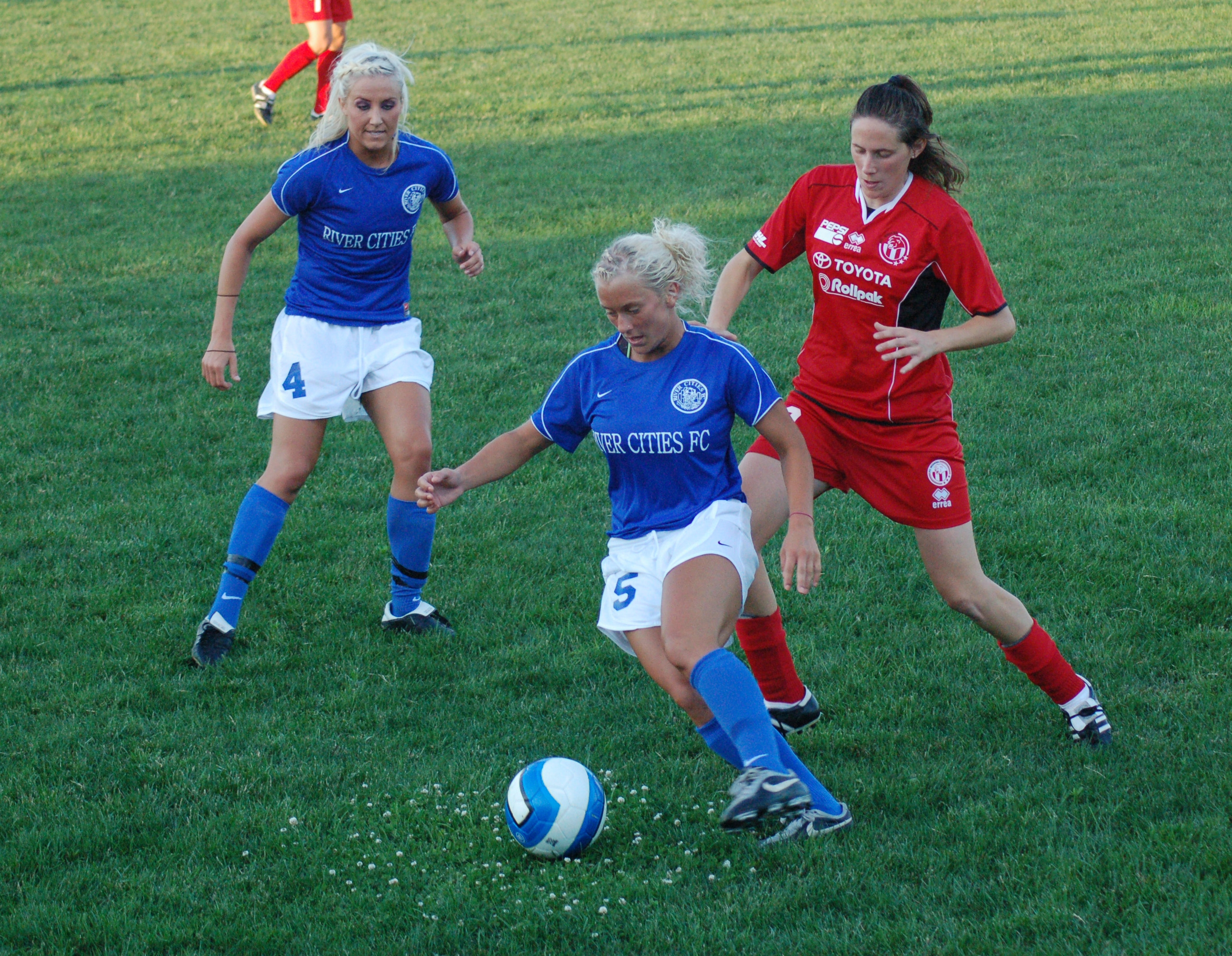
River Cities FC.

== Year-by-year ==
Year	Division	League	Reg. season	Playoffs
2004	1	USL W-League	9th, Midwest	
2005	2	WPSL	4th, Central	
2006	2	WPSL	1st, Midwest	
2007	2	WPSL	2nd, Midwest	Did not qualify

== Honors ==
- WPSL Midwest Conference Champions 2006

== Coaches ==
- 2004 Wendy Dillinger
- 2005 Beth Goetz
