= Colorado Springs United =

American women's soccer team

- Full name: Colorado Springs United
- Nickname: United
- Founded: 2005
- Stadium: UCCS Four Diamond Fields
- Chairman: (United States) Barry Brinton
- Manager: (England) Dan Highstead
- League: Women's Premier Soccer League
- 2008: 6th, Big Sky North Division
Home colors	Away colors

Colorado Springs United is an American women's soccer team, founded in 2005. The team is a member of the Women's Premier Soccer League, the third tier of women's soccer in the United States and Canada. The team plays in the North Division of the Big Sky Conference.

The team plays its home games at the UCCS Four Diamond Fields in Colorado Springs, Colorado. The club's colors are green and white.

During their first year in the WPSL, in 2006, the team was known as the Colorado Springs Sabers.

== Year-by-year ==
Year	Division	League	Reg. season	Playoffs
2006	2	WPSL	2nd, Southern Southwest	
2007	2	WPSL	5th, Southern Southwest	Did not qualify
2008	2	WPSL	6th, Big Sky North	Did not qualify

== Coaches ==
- (United States) Erik Oman 2006
- (England) Dan Highstead 2008–present

== Stadia ==
- UCCS Four Diamond Fields, Colorado Springs, Colorado -present
