= Sonoma County Sol (WPSL) =

- Full name: Sonoma County Futbol Club Sol
- Nickname: Sol
- Founded: 2005
- Ground: Ernie Nevers Field
- Chairman: (United States)
- Manager: (United States) Emiria Salzmann
- League: Women's Premier Soccer League
- 2008: 2nd, Pacific North Division; Playoff Conference Semi Finals
Home colors	Away colors

Sonoma County Sol was an American women's soccer team, founded in 2005. The team was a member of the Women's Premier Soccer League, the third tier of women's soccer in the United States and Canada. The team played in the North Division of the Pacific Conference. The team folded after the 2008 season.

The team played its home games at Ernie Nevers Field on the campus of Santa Rosa High School in the city of Santa Rosa, California, 55 miles north of San Francisco. The team's colors was blue and white.

The team was a sister organization of the men's Sonoma County Sol team, which plays in the National Premier Soccer League.

== Players ==
=== Squad 2008 ===
Note: Flags indicate national team as defined under FIFA eligibility rules; some limited exceptions apply. Players may hold more than one non-FIFA nationality.

No.	Pos.	Nation	Player
—		USA	Capricia Alston
—		USA	Laura Bahno
—		USA	Kelsey Baldwin
—		USA	Catherine Barnekow
—		USA	Valerie Barnes
—		USA	Alexica Bosque
—		USA	Julianna Bratsberg
—		USA	Elise Britt
—		USA	Courtney Brown
—		USA	Adelaide Cartan
—		USA	Tiffany Chappell
—		USA	Katherine Daiss
—		USA	Laura Fenton
—		USA	Alex Fisher
—		USA	Shannon Forslund
—		USA	Ashley Freyer
—		USA	Caitlin Hannegan
—		USA	Amanda Harris
—		USA	Crystal Howard
—		USA	Tiffany Hurst

No.	Pos.	Nation	Player
—		USA	Hayley Johnson
—		USA	Shawna Kelley
—		USA	Kimberly Kemper
—		USA	Kelsey Komrij
—		USA	Vanessa Nieto
—		IRL	Fiona O'Sullivan
—		USA	Casey Parisi
—		USA	Chelsea Pederson
—		USA	Sarah Peters
—		USA	Lauren Polson
—		USA	Susan Rea
—		USA	Natasha Richardson
—		USA	Alexis Rubattino
—		USA	Nikki Schrey
—		USA	Sierra Simmons
—		USA	Stacey Strong
—		USA	Erin Taratino
—		USA	Christina Tognetti
—		USA	Rochelle Van Buren

=== Notable former players ===
- Meagan McCray

== Year-by-year ==
Year	Division	League	Reg. season	Playoffs
2006	2	WPSL	4th, West	
2007	2	WPSL	4th, West	Did not qualify
2008	2	WPSL	2nd, Pacific North	Conference Semi Finals

== Coaches ==
- (United States) Emiria Salzmann 2007–present

== Stadia ==
- Ernie Nevers Field at Santa Rosa High School; Santa Rosa, California -present
