= Memphis Mercury =

American women's soccer team

Memphis Mercury was an American women's soccer team, founded in 2005. The team was a member of the Women's Premier Soccer League, the third tier of women’s soccer in the United States and Canada, until 2006, when the team left the league and the franchise was terminated.

The team played its home games at Mike Rose Soccer Complex in Memphis, Tennessee.

The team's colors were blue and white.

== Year-by-year ==
Year	Division	League	Reg. season	Playoffs
2006	2	WPSL	4th, Midwest	
