= Michigan Phoenix =

American women's soccer team

Michigan Phoenix was an American women's soccer team, founded in 2005. The team was a member of the Women's Premier Soccer League, the second tier of women’s soccer in the United States and Canada, until 2006, when the team left the league and the franchise was terminated.

== Year-by-year ==
| Year | Division | League | Reg. season | Playoffs |
|---|---|---|---|---|
| 2006 | 2 | WPSL | 5th, Midwest | |
