= Women's Premier Soccer League =

Women's soccer league in the United States

- Organizing body: United States Adult Soccer Association
- Founded: 1998; 28 years ago
- First season: 1998
- Country: United States
- Confederation: CONCACAF
- Divisions: 4 regions with 16 conferences
- Number of clubs: 144
- Current champion(s): KC Current II (2026)
- Most championships: California Storm (5 titles)
- Broadcaster: Eleven Sports
- Website: wpslsoccer.com
- Current: 2026

The Women's Premier Soccer League (WPSL) is an amateur women's soccer league in the United States.

== History ==
The WPSL is the longest-running active women's soccer league as it enters its 25th season in 2023. The WPSL is also the largest women's soccer league in the United States, North America and the world with 130 active teams as of 2023.

The WPSL started as the Western Division of the W-League, before breaking away to form its own league in 1998. The league is sanctioned by the United States Adult Soccer Association, an affiliate of the United States Soccer Federation (USSF). WPSL teams feature collegiate and post-collegiate players, who currently or previously played across all divisions of the NCAA, NAIA, and NJCAA. Former players of the WPSL have taken their playing careers to the next level by signing professional in the NWSL and top leagues overseas. WPSL alumnae have also reached international status by appearing at the FIFA Women's World Cup and the Olympics. Notable alumnae include Brandi Chastain, Kristine Lilly, Heather Mitts, Julie Foudy, Shannon Boxx, Alex Morgan and Leslie Osborne. The Jerry Zanelli Cup is awarded to the champion of each WPSL season.

When Women's Professional Soccer (WPS) suspended play in 2012, WPSL moved forward with its ambitions toward professionalism and created the WPSL Elite League. The Elite League was a pro-am league, with at least four fully professional teams, including three former WPS teams. The Elite league operated for just the 2012 season, disbanding in 2013 with the formation of the NWSL, which the three former WPS teams joined.

=== WPSL Division II ===
In 2021, the WPSL announced its second division, WPSL U21, which is scheduled to begin play in mid-2021. In September 2024, WPSL announced a change to the WPSL U21 program, evolving it to the WPSL Division II, which provides a pathway for higher developmental opportunities. The new division is set to launch in 2025, with an emphasis on competition and standards through a fully connected developmental program.

=== WPSL PRO ===
On February 8, 2023, WPSL announced plans to create a Division III professional league named WPSL PRO. The league plans to start in 2025 with ten teams. In August 2023, five teams signed letters of intent to join the WPSL Pro. SouthStar FC, Sioux Falls City FC, Oklahoma City FC (WPSL), Austin Rise FC, and The Town FC will be five of the first ten teams to join WPSL Pro. On February 6, 2024, the league announced the sixth team will be Georgia Impact FC. The league needs six teams to conform with US Soccer Division III Professional League Standards On February 20, 2024, the league announced the seventh team signing a letter of intent was AC Houston Sur for the 2025 season. On February 22, 2024, the league announced the first team signing a letter of intent for the 2026 season was Dakota Fusion FC. To celebrate Women's History Month, WPSL Pro revealed it's temporary branding and new website. The league confirmed they would reveal their official branding later in the year. In July 2024, WPSL Pro announced their ninth LOI from a group led by Gina Prodan Kelly to bring a club to Northeast Ohio. WPSL Pro reached the milestone of their 10th LOI from Soda City FC from Columbia, South Carolina, in August 2024. In September 2024, WPSL Pro announced their 11th and 12th LOIs, the first from Wichita, Kansas, and the second Indios Denver FC from Denver, Colorado.

=== League Affiliations ===
On April 2, 2024, WPSL announced they had partnered with the Michigan Super League to provide support to the development of underrepresented leagues. The WPSL will partner with the United States Adult Soccer Association to provide support to these leagues. The Michigan Super League will consist of five teams for the 2024 season. On January 3, 2025, WPSL announced a partnership with Gulf Coast Premier League (GCPL). This partnership will have 8 of the 12 top GCPL teams form the Gulf Coast Conference for the 2025 season, allowing for the opportunity to participate in regional and national play-offs.

== WPSL champions ==
As of July 24, 2026.

Season	Champions	Runners-up
1998	Silicon Valley Red Devils	Auto Trader Select
1999	California Storm	San Diego Auto Trader
2000	San Diego W.F.C.	California Storm
2001	Ajax of Southern California	San Diego W.F.C.
2002	California Storm (2)	Ajax America Women
2003	Utah Spiders	California Storm
2004	California Storm (3)	New England Mutiny
2005	F.C. Indiana	California Storm
2006	Long Island Fury	River Cities FC
2007	F.C. Indiana (2)	New England Mutiny
2008	Ajax America Women (2)	Arizona Rush
2009	Long Island Fury (2)	Ajax America Women
2010	Boston Aztec	Ajax America Women
2011	Orange County Waves	Chicago Red Stars
2012	Gulf Coast Texans	Boston Aztec
2013	San Diego WFC SeaLions (2)	Houston Aces
2014	Beach Futbol Club	Houston Aces
2015	Chicago Red Stars Reserves	SoCal FC
2016	Boston Breakers Reserves	San Diego WFC SeaLions
2017	Fire & Ice SC	Gulf Coast Texans
2018	Seattle Sounders Women	Pensacola FC Women
2019	Pensacola FC Women	Utah Royals FC Reserves
2020	Canceled due to COVID-19 pandemic	
2021	No National Champion	
2022	California Storm (4)	Colorado Rapids Women
2023	Charlotte Eagles	Salvo SC
2024	California Storm (5)	Charlotte Eagles
2025	Sporting CT	California Storm
2026	KC Current II	New York Athletic Club

== Staff ==
=== Executive committee ===
As of November 28, 2023.

- Sean Jones – president
- DeBray Ayala – vice-president
- Brad Lund – vice-president
- Kendra Halterman – commissioner
- Matt Homonoff – deputy commissioner
- Rich Sparling – commissioner emeritus

=== Front office ===
As of November 28, 2023.

- Nichole Singleton – communications & creative services director
- Alex Simpson - team services manager (West & East)
- Jaclyn Purvine - team services manager (Central & South)
- Lunden Foreman – team services manager (WPSL U21)
- Rob Kehoe – collegiate relations
- Josh Fredrickson – match reporting
- David Simmons – referee coordinator
- Dr. Vytas Ringus – medical director

=== Associate commissioners ===
As of November 28, 2023.

- Shelley Dougherty – East Region
- Gretchen Hammel – South Region
- Lindsay Eversmeyer – Central Region
- Sly Yeates – West Region

== League Structure ==
The league is divided into four regions - West, Central, South, and East. Each region is divided into conferences, with the West Region having four conferences, two of which has two divisions and one of which that has three divisions, the Central Region having four conferences, one of which has two divisions, the South Region having four conferences, two of which has two divisions, and the East Region having four conferences, one of which has two divisions.

=== Current teams ===
Team	City	Stadium	Founded	First WPSL Season	Head coach
West Region
Mountain West Conference
Desert Division
Arizona Arsenal Soccer Club	Mesa, Arizona	Bell Bank Park	1992	2023	
Desert Dreams FC	Peoria, Arizona	Peoria Sports Complex		2025	
El Paso Surf	El Paso, Texas				(United States) David Lopez
FC Tucson	Tucson, Arizona	Kino North Stadium	2013	2013	(United States) Kelly Pierce
Royals AZ	Scottsdale, Arizona	Notre Dame High School		2023	
Rockies Division
Aggies FC	Fort Collins, Colorado			2025	
Colorado Elevation FC	Highland Ranch, Colorado			2025	
Colorado Pride	Colorado Springs, Colorado	Washburn Field	2014	2018	(United States) Andi Waterhouse
Northern Colorado Rain FC	Windsor, Colorado			2025	(United States) Kelly Brown
WPSL Denver (Note: Formerly known as Indios Denver FC)	Denver, Colorado				Juan Martinez
Wasatch Division
Black Diamond FC (Note: Formerly known at MetaSport FC)	Salt Lake City, Utah				
City SC Utah	Sandy, Utah				(United States) Dennis Burrows
Griffins FC					
La Roca FC	South Weber, Utah				(United States) Kelly Parke
NorCal Conference
Central Valley Division
Fresno Freeze	Fresno, California	Keith Tice Park	2015	2015	(United States) Ivan Janssens
Fuego Femenil	Fresno, California			2026	Jasara Gillette
Lamorinda United	Moraga, California	Miramonte High School			Mohamed Mohamed
San Francisco Glens	San Francisco, California			2026	
San Francisco Nighthawks	San Francisco, California	Kezar Stadium	1995	1995	(Iceland) Petra Kowalski
San Ramon FC	San Ramon, California	Tiffany Roberts Field	2015	2015	(United States) Mani Salimpour
WPSL East Bay	Oakland, California			2026	
Sacramento Valley Division
California Storm	Davis, California			1995	
FC Davis	Davis, California	Playfields Sports Park			(United States) Pip Harragin
Iron Rose FC	Roseville, California			2024	
Napa Valley 1839 FC	Napa, California	Dodd Stadium	2016	2016	(England) Ben Solomon
Nevada Futbol Club	Reno, Nevada			2026	
Yuba Football Club	Sacramento, California		2022	2026	Pete Afato
PAC Northwest Conference
Portland Thorns FC II	Portland, Oregon		2024	2024	
Seattle Reign FC II	Seattle, Washington	Starfire Field	2024	2024	(United States) Reilee DuPratt
Vancouver Victory FC	Vancouver, Washington			2024	
Westside Metros FC	Beaverton, Oregon	Sherwood Middle School	1993		(United States) Cory Hand
So Cal Conference
Coastal Division
Beach Futbol Club	Long Beach, California		2012	2024	
FC Premier Women	Bellflower, California	St. John Bosco High School	2020	2021	Trevor Labuschagne
LA Surf Soccer Club	Pasadena, California		2014	2014	(United States) Mike Davis
Miss Kick FC California (2022–2024)		2022	2026		
Southern California Eagles	La Mirada, California	Al Barbour Field	1983	2024	
Plymouth Division
ALBION San Diego	San Diego, California				(United States) Eloisa Borreguero
Future FC	Anaheim, California				
Rebels Soccer Club	San Diego, California		1982	2024	Abel Martinez
San Diego Parceiro Ladies	San Diego, California		2018	2018	
So Cal Union FC	Temecula, California	Sommers Bend	2016	2018	(United States) Rudy Canales
Central Region
Lake Shore Conference
Bavarian United SC	Glendale, Wisconsin				
Chicago House AC	Chicago, Illinois		2023	2024	Henry Cheung
Chicago KICS Football Club	Chicago, Illinois	De La Salle Institute	2021	2021	Antonio Godinez
FC Milwaukee Torrent	Wauwatosa, Wisconsin	Hart Park	2017	2018	(Germany) Andreas Davi
Green Bay Glory	Green Bay, Wisconsin			2022	
Milwaukee City AFC	Milwaukee, Wisconsin	Uihlein Soccer Park	2024	2025	Lana Saypanya
Lone Star Conference
Austin Rise FC	Austin, Texas	House Park Stadium	2023	2023	Tom Krall
FC Dallas	Frisco, Texas		2019	2025 (returning)	
Fort Worth Vaqueras	Fort Worth, Texas		2013		
SouthStar FC	Addison, Texas		2019	2019	(United States) Casey Loyd
Texas Lone Star SC				2026	
Midwest Conference
Gateway Division
FC Pride	Indianapolis, Indiana	FC Pride Turf Stadium	2014	2014	(United States) Jamie Gilbert
Junction FC	Urbana, Illinois		2024	2024	Kip McDaniel
Lou Fusz Athletic	Earth City, Missouri				(United States) Jeff Tottleben
Missouri Reign	Columbia, Missouri				
Missouri Rush	St. Louis, Missouri	Missouri Rush Sports Park	2017	2026	Scott McCall
Heartland Division
FC Wichita	Wichita, Kansas				
Kansas City Current II			2022	2026	
KC Courage	Kansas City, Missouri		2022	2026	
Oklahoma City FC	Mustang, Oklahoma	Mustang High School	2007	2007	(United States) Daniel Gibson
Side FC 92	Tulsa, Oklahoma		2021	2024	
Sunflower State FC	Overland Park, Kansas	Rockhurst University		2023	(Brazil) Jose Ramos
Union KC	Kansas City, Missouri			2025	
Northern Conference
Joy AC	St. Louis Park, Minnesota	St Louis Park High School	2022	2022	
Manitou F.C.	White Bear Lake, Minnesota	White Bear Lake High School			(Bosnia and Herzegovina) Edi Buro
Mankato United Soccer Club	Mankato, Minnesota	Bethany Luteran College			(England) Tudor Flintham
Minnesota Dutch Lions FC	Rochester, Minnesota				
Minnesota Thunder	Richfield, Minnesota	Academy of Holy Angels	2006		
MN Bliss FC	Minneapolis, Minnesota				
Salvo SC	Eagan, Minnesota	University of Northwestern	2019	2019	(United States) Greg Wheaton
St. Croix Soccer Club	St. Croix County, Wisconsin	Stillwater Area High School			
South Region
Atlantic Conference
Carolinas Division
Carolina FC					
NCFC Grey					
NCFC Navy					
Soda City FC	Columbia, South Carolina			2025 (returning)	
Women's Football Club of Charlotte	Charlotte, North Carolina				(United States) Scott Ginn
The District Division
Alexandria Reds	Washington D.C.		1970	2024	(United States) Scott Ginn
Arlington Soccer					
Arlington Soccer U21s					
District Elite FC	Washington D.C.		2012	2026	
Gulf Coast Conference
Sunshine Division
Florida Gulf Coast Dutch Lions FC	Fort Myers, Florida	Paradise Coast Sports Complex	2015	2015	(Greece) Katie Bond
Fusion FC	Miami, Florida				
West Florida Flames	Tarpon Springs, Florida				(England) Jamie McGuinness
Third Coast Division
Gulf Coast United	Gulfport, Mississippi			2025	
Legacy FC (Note: Formerly known as Florida Roots)	Panama City, Florida			2025	
Pensacola FC	Pensacola, Florida			2025	
Pensacola FC Academy	Pensacola, Florida			2025	
Union 10 FC	Mobile, Alabama			2025	
Valdosta FC	Valdosta, Georgia		2024	2025	Tony Voyles
Mississippi Delta Division
Baton Rouge United	Baton Rouge, Louisiana			2025	
Hattiesburg FC	Hattiesburg, Mississippi			2025	
LA Krew Rush	Lafayette, Louisiana			2025	
Little Rock Rangers SC	Little Rock, Arkansas		2015	2026	(Canada) Ante Jazić
Mississippi Blues SC	Jackson, Mississippi			2025	
Shreveport United	Shreveport, Louisiana			2025	
Southeast Conference
865 Alliance	Knoxville, Tennessee		2023	2023	Laban Defriese
Atlanta Fire United	Duluth, Georgia	Notre Dame Turf Field	2023	2023	(United States) Domenic Martelli
Chattanooga FC	Chattanooga, Tennessee	Finley Stadium	2014	2014	(United States) Randy Douglas
Decatur FC	Atlanta, Georgia			2024	
Georgia Impact					
Nashville Rhythm F.C.	Nashville, Tennessee	Giacosa Stadium	2017	2017	Scott Davidson
Tennessee Tempo FC	Murfreesboro, Tennessee		2023	2025	Carianne Bricker
UFA Gunners	Atlanta, Georgia		2010	2024	
East Region
Great Lakes Conference
Great River Conference
Columbus Eagles FC	Columbus, Ohio	Crew Stadium	2014	2014	(United States) Matt Ogden
Corktown WFC	Detroit, Michigan		2022	2024	Aaron Roy
FC Dayton	Dayton, Ohio	Centerville Soccer Complex	2022	2022	(United States) Bradley Schluter
Greater Toledo FC	Toledo, Ohio		1996	2024	Danny Fisher
Michigan Rangers FC	Grand Rapids, Michigan		1993	2026	Mario Zuniga-Gil
Lake Erie Division
Beadling Soccer Club	Bridgeville, Pennsylvania				(United States) Matt Fonagy
Erie FC	Erie, Pennsylvania				
Internationals Soccer Club	Cleveland, Ohio		1977	2025	(United States) Keri Sarver
Niagara 1812	Buffalo, New York			2024	Lucio Ianiero
Rochester NY FC	Rochester, New York	RNY FC Soccer Complex	2023	2023	(Estonia) Katrin Kaarna
Metropolitan Conference
Brooklyn City F.C.	Brooklyn, New York	Aviator Sports and Events Center	2021	2021	(United States) Kim Wyant
Clarkstown Soccer Club	New City, New York				(United States) Daniel Samimi
Force FC New York					
New York Athletic Club	Pelham Manor, New York	New York Athletic Club	2006	2006	(Argentina) Juan Gatti
New York Dutch Lions FC	Brooklyn, New York	Long Island University - Brooklyn Campus	2016	2017	Rogier Schultz
STA	Randolph, New Jersey		2005	2005	(United States) Kelly Sims
SUSA FC	Central Islip, New York		2001	2001	JR Bazlarini & Nicholas Flaim
Mid-Atlantic Conference
Colonial Division
Delaware Ospreys	Frederica, Delaware				Joe Brown
FC Monmouth	Monmouth County, New Jersey	Count Basie Park	2024	2025	Lou Santa Cruz
Fever SC	Bensalem Township, Pennsylvania				(United States) Bob Wilkinson
Kensington Soccer Club	Philadelphia, Pennsylvania		2010	2026	
Love City FC	Philadelphia, Pennsylvania		2025	2026	
Penn Fusion SA	West Chester, Pennsylvania	West Chester Rustin High School	2016	2016	(United States) Susan Barr
Philadelphia Ukrainian Nationals - Liberty					
Real Central NJ	Trenton, New Jersey	Rider University	2020	2021	Brian Thomsen
SJEB FC	Sicklerville, New Jersey		2021	2021	Christos Economopoulos & John Thompson
Commonwealth Division
Hershey FC	Hershey, Pennsylvania				
Hex FC Tempest					
Keystone FC	Harrisburg, Pennsylvania		1980	2024	
LVU Rush	Quakertown, Pennsylvania				
PA Classics	Lancaster, Pennsylvania		2022	2022	(United States) Todd Hoffard
Reading United A.C.	Reading, Pennsylvania		2023	2023	(United States) Thomas Gosselin
West-Mont United	Philadelphia, Pennsylvania		1976	2024	Daniel Clitnovici
Northeastern Conference
Albany Rush	Albany, New York		2021	2025	Brian Gordon
CT Rush			2022	2026	Tom Newell
Inter Connecticut FC	Norwalk, Connecticut		2008	2026	Ashley Cabral
Merrimack Valley Hawks FC	Boston, Massachusetts			2024	
Rhode Island Rogues	Bristol, Rhode Island	Roger Williams University			Brandon Iannelli
Sporting CT	Hartford, Connecticut		2012	2025	Matt Cameron
Vale SC	Hartford, Connecticut			2026	
Vermont Wild FC	Manchester, Vermont			2026	

==== Division II ====
Team	City	Stadium	Founded	First Season	Head coach
Albuquerque Alliance	Albuquerque, New Mexico	Bernalillo High School		2025	
Alexandria Reds	Alexandria, Virginia			2025	
Arizona Desert Surf	Tucson, Arizona			2025	
Arlington Soccer	Arlington, Virginia			2025	
Atletico NM	Albuquerque, New Mexico			2025	
Beach FC	Virginia Beach, Virginia			2025	
Davis Legacy SC	Sacramento, California			2025	
FC Spirit	Evansville, Indiana			2025	
Fever United	Southlake, Texas	St Martin-in-the-Fields Episcopal		2025	
FIERCE United	Austin, Texas	Round Rock Multipurpose Complex		2025	
Flick City Channel Cats	Tulsa, Oklahoma			2025	
Houston Futsal SC	League City, Texas	The Ballpark at League City		2025	
Hudson Valley Crusaders	Cairo, New York			2025	
Independence FC	Jersey City, New Jersey			2025	
Iron Rose FC Reserves	Roseville, California			2025	
Kansas Rush Wichita	Wichita, Kansas	Stryker Sports Complex		2025	
Las Vegas Ballers	Las Vegas, Nevada			2025	
MCSC Jaguars	Salinas, California			2025	
Naples United FC	Naples, Florida			2025	
Napa Valley 1839 FC Reserves	Napa, California			2025	
Nebraska Fierce	Omaha, Nebraska			2025	
Neuse River FA	Archer Lodge, North Carolina			2025	
Northern Arizona Altitude	Flagstaff, Arizona			2025	
NTX Celtic FC	Denton, Texas			2025	
Oakland SC	Oakland, California			2025	
Oklahoma City FC Reserves	Mustang, Oklahoma	Mustang High School		2025	
Peoria City Reserves	Peoria, Illinois			2025	
PHX Heat FC Reserves	Phoenix, Arizona			2025	
Pima County Surf	Tucson, Arizona			2025	
River City FC	St. Louis, Missouri			2025	
SA City Soccer Club	San Antonio, Texas			2025	
Salinas Cosmos F.C.	Salinas, California			2026	
San Francisco Elite Reserves	San Francisco, California			2025	
San Francisco Nighthawks Reserves	San Francisco, California	Kezar Stadium		2025	
SC Union Maricopa	Chandler, Arizona			2025	
Shakopee	Minneapolis, Minnesota			2025	
Simply Futbol FC	Allen, Texas			2025	
Sioux City Sol	Sioux City, Iowa			2025	
State 48 FC Sahuaros	Phoenix, Arizona			2025	
UK F.C.	Richmond, Virginia			2025	
Union KC Reserves	Kansas City, Missouri			2025	
Union KC 2 Reserves	Kansas City, Missouri			2025	
Vale SC	Hartford, Connecticut			2026	
Warrior FC	Spencer, Iowa			2025	

1. Returning to WPSL Division II

== Former teams ==
- AFC Columbia Missouri (2020–2023)
- ACF Torino USA Maryland (2014–2015)
- AGC Football (2024–2025)
- AHFC Royals Texas
- Ambassadors Cleveland Ohio (2021–2024)
- ASA Charge FC Maryland
- Ajax America Women California
- Albuquerque Crush New Mexico (2002)
- Albuquerque Lady Asylum New Mexico (2007–2008)
- American Eagles Soccer Club Texas
- Arizona Sahuaros Arizona (2003)
- Arkansas Comets Arkansas
- Atlanta Silverbacks Women Georgia
- Auto Trader Select SC California (1998–1999)
- Bat Country FC Texas (2021–2023)
- BattleBorn FC Nevada (2023–2024)
- Bay Area Breeze California (2011–2012) – Left to join W-League
- BC United (2024–2025)
- Boston Aztec Massachusetts
- Brevard County Cocoa Expos Florida (2008)
- Broomfield Burn Colorado
- Boulder County United Colorado (2021–2023)
- Cape Coral Cyclones Florida
- Challenge Red Devils Texas
- CFC Passion Connecticut
- Central California Gold California (2004)
- Central California HEAT California
- Charlotte Eagles North Carolina
- Cincinnati Lady Saints Ohio (2014–15)
- Claremont Stars California (2007–2011)
- Classics Elite SA Texas
- Clermont Phoenix Florida
- Cleveland Ambassadors Ohio (2017–2024)
- Club Tijuana USA Baja California
- Colorado Blizzard FC
- Colorado Rapids Women Colorado (2019–2023)
- Colorado Rush (2021–2022)
- Colorado Springs United Colorado (2007–2008, Colorado Springs Sabers 2006)
- Corinthians FC of San Antonio (2025–2026)
- CU Diamonds Washington
- Dayton Dutch Lions WFC Ohio (2016–2024)
- Cultures United Football Club Washington (2020–2023)
- Dade County Football Club Florida (2024)
- Dakota Fusion FC North Dakota (2018–2024)
- Diablo Valley Wolves California (2021–2023)
- DKSC BADTOP Texas
- Downtown United Soccer Club f
- Elite Development Academy California (2020–2023)
- Elk Grove Pride California (2002–2005)
- Emerald City FC Washington
- Empire Revs WNY New York (2013–2015)
- Everton FC America Texas (2005)
- Eugene Timbers FC Azul Oregon
- FC Austin Texas
- FC Birmingham Women (2023–2025)
- FC Metro Magic Missouri (2009–2010)
- FC Milwaukee Nationals Wisconsin
- FC Nashville Wolves Tennessee (2021–2024)
- FC Prime Florida
- FC PrimeTime (2025)
- FC Sacramento Thunder California (1998–1999)
- FC Spirit Indiana
- FC St. George Utah
- FC St. Louis (2006–2008)
- FC Surge Florida (2013–2023)
- FC Ulindi Pennsylvania
- FC Virginia Virginia (2006)
- FC Westchester New York
- Flatirons Rush SC Colorado (2023)
- Florida Krush Florida
- Florida Premier FC
- Foothill FC California (2000)
- Fort Lauderdale Fusion Florida (2006)
- Fort Wayne FC Indiana
- Fresno FC Ladies California (2018)
- Futbolera Select (2024–2025)
- Georgia Revolution Georgia
- Houston Aces (2012–2024)
- Houston Stars Texas (2003–2005)
- Houston Tornadoes Texas (2003)
- Indiana United Indiana
- Iowa Raptors FC Iowa (2021–2023)
- Jackson Ignite (2025)
- Jacksonville Armada FC (2024–2025)
- Kansas City Scott Gallagher SC Missouri (2023–2024)
- Kingston Capitals (2025)
- L.A. Salsa California
- Lancaster Inferno (WPSL) Pennsylvania – moved to United Women's Soccer
- Las Vegas Shooters Nevada (1998–1999, 2001)
- Las Vegas Tabagators Nevada (2004–2006)
- FC Lehigh Valley Lady Sonic Pennsylvania – Left to join W-League
- Lions Swarm Maryland
- Liverpool Lady Warriors Texas
- Lonestar SC Texas
- Madison 56ers Wisconsin
- MapleBrook Fury Minnesota
- Maryland Capitols FC Maryland
- Maryland Pride Maryland (2004–2007, 2009–2010)
- Massachusetts Stingers Massachusetts (2004–2007)
- McLean Soccer (2024–2026)
- Memphis Mercury Tennessee (2006)
- Michigan Chill SC Michigan (2016)
- Michigan Lions Michigan
- Michigan Phoenix Michigan (2006)
- Midwest Select SA Muskrats Indiana
- Mississippi Fuego FC Mississippi
- Mississippi Fuego FC U23 Mississippi (2012)
- Neuse River Futbol Alliance North Carolina
- New England Mutiny Massachusetts – moved to United Women's Soccer
- New England Mutiny Reserves Massachusetts
- New Jersey Blaze New Jersey
- New York Shockers
- New York Vendaval New York (2003)
- NJ Wizards SC New Jersey
- Norcal Shockwaves California (1998–1999)
- North Shore Girls Soccer Club British Columbia (2016–2017)
- Northampton Laurels Pennsylvania (2006–2008)
- Northern California Blues California (2003–2004)
- Northern Utah United Utah (2024–2025)
- ODFC Cesena
- Oregon Rush Oregon
- Orlando Falcons Florida (2006–2007)
- Ohio Galaxies Ohio
- Ohio Premier Women's SC Ohio
- Orange County Waves California (2011)
- OSA XF Washington (2022–2023)
- PAO ST. Louis Missouri (2011) no games played
- Palm City FC Florida
- Peoria City (2025)
- Philadelphia Fever Pennsylvania
- Phoenix U23 Arizona (2012)
- PHX Heat FC (2025)
- Pines 1779 Texas
- Portland Rain Oregon
- Port City FC (2024–2025)
- PSD Academy (2024–2025)
- Quad City Eagles Illinois
- Quad Cities Rush Iowa
- Real Del Mar California (1998)
- Real Salt Lake Women Utah – moved to United Women's Soccer
- Real Shore FC New Jersey (2007)
- Rebels Empire California (2023–2024)
- Reno Zephyrs Nevada (1999)
- Rochester United FC Minnesota (2019–2024)
- Royals AZ Arizona (2023–present)
- Rhode Island Rays Rhode Island (2003–2006)
- River Cities FC Missouri (2006–2007)
- RSL Southern Arizona Arizona (2024)
- Rochester Reign New York (2004)
- San Antonio Blossoms Texas (2018–2023)
- San Antonio Runners Texas (2024–2025)
- San Diego Dons (2025)
- San Diego Strikers (2018–2025)
- San Diego Surf SC (2023–2025)
- San Francisco Elite Soccer Club (2023–2025)
- San Francisco Skyhawks California (1998–1999)
- San Joaquin Valley Quest California (2003)
- SC del Sol (2010–2025)
- Seminole Ice
- Sioux City Sol Iowa (2024)
- Sioux Falls City FC Iowa (2022–2024)
- SoCal Dutch Lions FC (2022–2025)
- St. George United Utah
- St. Louis Archers Missouri (2005)
- St. Louis Scott Gallagher Elite Missouri (2009–2010, 2023)
- Silicon Valley Red Devils California (1998–2000)
- Spokane Shine Washington
- Sonoma County Sol California (2006–2008)
- Sonoran Thunder Arizona (2002–2003)
- SoCal Reds FC California (2023)
- South Florida Strikers Florida
- Spokane SC Shadow (2019–2025)
- Steel City Sparks Pennsylvania (2004–05)
- Tampa Bay Elite Florida (2006–2007)
- Team Boca Blast Florida (2012–2023)
- Tennessee Lady Blues Tennessee (2006)
- Texas Football Club Texas
- Tidewater Sharks Virginia
- Tkaronto Justice New York (2015)
- TLH Reckoning (2025)
- Torch FC Pennsylvania
- Trinity Fire North Carolina (2024)
- Tri-City Celtics New York
- Tulsa Soccer Club Oklahoma (2018–2023)
- UK F.C. (2024–2025)
- Utah Avalanche (2023–2025)
- Utah Surf (2021–2025)
- United FC Binghamton New York
- United Soccer Alliance Florida
- Utah Starzz Utah
- Vancouver Island FC British Columbia (2019)
- Vancouver Angels British Columbia (2000)
- Vermont Fusion Vermont
- TSS FC Rovers British Columbia (2018–2020)
- Washington Dutch Lions FC Washington D.C. (2021–2024)
- West Texas Pride FC Texas
- Windsor Essex FC Ontario (2015)

== See also ==
- NWSL
- Women's Premier Soccer League Canada
- WPSL Elite League
