= 2015 Seattle Reign FC season =

Seattle Reign FC
2015 season
- Owners: Bill and Teresa Predmore
- General manager: Laura Harvey
- Head coach: Laura Harvey
- Stadium: Memorial Stadium
- NWSL: 1st place
- Playoffs: Runner-Up
- Top goalscorer: League: Kim Little (10); All: Kim Little (10); Beverly Yanez (10)
- Highest home attendance: 6,303 (July 26 vs. Portland Thorns)
- Lowest home attendance: 2,225 (June 6 vs. Sky Blue)
- Average home league attendance: 4,060
Home colors	Away colors	Third colors

The 2015 Seattle Reign FC season was the club's third season of play and their third season in the National Women's Soccer League, the top division of women's soccer in the United States. To accommodate the 2015 FIFA Women's World Cup, the league announced that it would reduce the season to 20 games while extending the calendar length into September and take a two-week break from June 7–19.

== Review and events ==
=== Preseason ===
Following a record-breaking 2014 season that saw the team winning the NWSL Shield and losing to FC Kansas City in the playoffs final, Head Coach and GM Laura Harvey expected minimal roster turnover entering into the off-season. Key contributors Nahomi Kawasumi and Beverly Goebel both returned to INAC Kobe Leonessa at the end of their season-long loans. In November, the team acquired the rights to midfielder Merritt Mathias from FC Kansas City in exchange for defender Kate Deines and the 16th and 26th draft picks in the 2015 NWSL College Draft. Two days later, Harvey added former Portland Pilots defender Michelle Cruz.

Prior to the 2015 NWSL College Draft, Harvey signed forward Beverly Yanez from Japanese club INAC Kobe Leonessa. Yanez, under her maiden name Goebel, played in Seattle on loan in 2014, scoring five goals and adding four assists while helping the Reign FC to a regular season title. A day later, NWSL announced allocated National Team players for the 2015 season, with Reign FC defenders Stephanie Cox and Carmelina Moscato removed from the list. The club expects to bring Cox back on a standard contract but has announced that Moscato will be exploring playing opportunities overseas. Then on January 16, the Harvey selected Florida Gators midfielder Havana Solaun and Stanford Cardinal defender Kendall Romine at the NWSL Draft.

In anticipation for post-World Cup fatigue for the national team players, Harvey signed Danish forward Katrine Veje on January 21. Veje will join the club on July 1 after her current contract with Brøndby IF ends. The club was also able to retain defender Stephanie Cox by signing her to a standard contract after she was removed from allocation by U.S. Soccer. To make room on the roster, Harvey waived second-year defenders Megan Brigman and Holly Hein. Additional defensive reinforcement came soon after as the club signed Scottish international Rachel Corsie from Notts County Ladies F.C. on January 29.

For the second season in a row, the Reign FC was involved in a blockbuster trade as last season's prized acquisition Sydney Leroux requested a move away from the club. On March 30, Harvey sent Leroux and Amanda Frisbie to Western New York Flash; in return, the club received midfielder Amber Brooks, WNY's first-round draft pick in the 2016 NWSL College Draft, and the rights to Leroux's international teammate Abby Wambach. Wambach had already announced that she will not play this season to concentrate on preparing for the 2015 FIFA Women's World Cup, and Harvey does not expect her to suit up for the Reign FC until 2016 at the earliest. The club then finalized its roster by signing second-round draft pick Havana Solaun on April 3.

The Reign FC headed into the regular season with a 19-player roster, with the one open spot reserved for Danish forward Katrine Veje's mid-season arrival. It includes 14 returners from last season's Shield-winning team, featuring league MVP Kim Little and fellow Best XI selections Jess Fishlock and Kendall Fletcher. Harvey hopes that the blend of returning core plus new acquisitions will help the club defend its Shield and win the playoffs this year.

== Club ==
=== Coaching staff ===
Position	Staff
General Manager & Head Coach	(England) Laura Harvey
Assistant Coach	(England) Sam Laity
Goalkeeper Coach	(United States) Ben Dragavon

Last updated: April 13, 2015
Source: http://www.nwslsoccer.com/teams/74415303/58150141-74415358/TEAM.html

=== Roster ===
Note: Flags indicate national team as defined under FIFA eligibility rules; some limited exceptions apply. Players may hold more than one non-FIFA nationality.

No.	Pos.	Nation	Player
3	DF	USA	Lauren Barnes
22	MF	USA	Amber Brooks
20	MF	SAM	Mariah Bullock
4	DF	SCO	Rachel Corsie
14	DF	USA	Stephanie Cox
21	DF	USA	Michelle Cruz
25	DF	USA	Kiersten Dallstream
10	MF	WAL	Jess Fishlock
13	DF	USA	Kendall Fletcher
18	FW	USA	Danielle Foxhoven
28	GK	USA	Haley Kopmeyer

No.	Pos.	Nation	Player
8	MF	SCO	Kim Little
9	MF	USA	Merritt Mathias
15	MF	USA	Megan Rapinoe
7	DF	USA	Elli Reed
19	MF	USA	Havana Solaun
1	GK	USA	Hope Solo
12	GK	USA	Caroline Stanley
24	FW	DEN	Katrine Veje
11	MF	USA	Keelin Winters (captain)
17	FW	USA	Beverly Yanez

== Competitions ==
Win Tie Loss

=== Preseason ===
March 28, 2015	Portland Pilots	0–5	Seattle Reign FC	Portland, Oregon
19:00 PDT		Report	Winters 9'; Foxhoven 38'; Little 45', 52'; Cox 48'	Stadium: Merlo Field

April 3, 2015	Seattle Reign FC	2–0	Washington Huskies	Seattle, Washington
19:00 PDT	Foxhoven 12'; Yanez 69'	Report		Stadium: Memorial Stadium

=== International friendlies ===
May 22, 2015	Seattle Reign FC	1–1	China WNT	Seattle, Washington
19:00 PDT	Yanez 48'	Box; Report	Ren 36'	Stadium: Memorial Stadium; Attendance: 4,021; Referee: Katja Koroleva

=== Regular season ===
April 12, 2015 1	Seattle Reign FC	5–1	Western New York Flash	Seattle, Washington
16:00 (PDT)	Fishlock 25'; Yanez 53'; Rapinoe 71', 74', 86'	Box; Report	Angeli (yellow card) 57' (goal) 68'	Stadium: Memorial Stadium; Attendance: 2,642; Referee: Christina Unkel

April 18, 2015 2	Chicago Red Stars	3–2	Seattle Reign FC	Lisle, Illinois
17:00 (PDT)	Press 32', 90+1'; Hoy 35'	Box; Report	Yanez 31'; Fletcher 39'	Stadium: Village of Lisle-Benedictine University Sports Complex; Attendance: 2,368; Referee: David Mon

April 23, 2015 3	FC Kansas City	1–0	Seattle Reign FC	Kansas City, Missouri
17:00 (PDT)	Rodriguez 49'	Box; Report		Stadium: Swope Soccer Village; Attendance: 2,466; Referee: Brandon Artis

May 2, 2015 4	Seattle Reign FC	3–1	Washington Spirit	Seattle, Washington
19:00 (PDT)	Yanez 36'; Mathias 48'; Fishlock 75'	Box; Report	Lohman 63'	Stadium: Memorial Stadium; Attendance: 2,703; Referee: Karen ABT

May 9, 2015 5	Sky Blue FC	1–1	Seattle Reign FC	Piscataway, New Jersey
16:00 (PDT)	Nadim (yellow card) 78' (goal) 90' (pen.); Grubka (yellow card) 82'	Box; Report	Barnes 76'; Fishlock (red card) 90'	Stadium: Yurcak Field; Attendance: 1562; Referee: Matthew Kreitzer

May 30, 2015 6	Seattle Reign FC	0–0	Chicago Red Stars	Seattle, Washington
19:00 (PDT)	Mathias (yellow card) 90'	Box; Report	Colaprico (yellow card) 61'	Stadium: Memorial Stadium; Attendance: 2,367; Referee: Brandon Artis

June 6, 2015 7	Seattle Reign FC	3–0	Sky Blue FC	Seattle, Washington
19:00 (PDT)	Winters 8'; Fishlock 28'; Little 77' (pen.)	Box; Report		Stadium: Memorial Stadium; Attendance: 2,225; Referee: Greg Dopka

June 21, 2015 8	Boston Breakers	2–3	Seattle Reign FC	Boston, Massachusetts
13:00 (PDT)	Mewis 14'; Marlborough 76'; King (yellow card); Pires (yellow card)	Box; Report	Little 42'; Yanez 66'; Fishlock 86'; Foxhoven (yellow card)	Stadium: Soldiers Field Soccer Stadium; Attendance: 2,145; Referee: Matthew Kreitzer

June 27, 2015 9	Seattle Reign FC	2–1	FC Kansas City	Seattle, Washington
19:30 (PDT)	Yanez 62'; Little 63'; Barnes (yellow card) 67'	Box; Report	Groom 90+'	Stadium: Memorial Stadium; Attendance: 3,331; Referee: Ekaterina Koroleva

July 3, 2015 10	Western New York Flash	1–1	Seattle Reign FC	Rochester, New York
16:00 (PDT)	Williams 81'	Box; Report	Little 55' (pen.)	Stadium: Sahlen's Stadium; Attendance: 2377; Referee: Greg Dopla

July 11, 2015 11	Seattle Reign FC	4–2	Western New York Flash	Seattle, Washington
19:00 (PDT)	Yanez 49'; Corsie 52'; Brooks 55'; Fishlock 73'	Box; Report	Frisbie 34'; Edwards 67'; Dahlkemper (yellow card) 89'	Stadium: Memorial Stadium; Attendance: 5,778; Referee: Brandon Artis

July 18, 2015 12	Washington Spirit	3–0	Seattle Reign FC	Germantown, Maryland
16:00 (PDT)	Reynolds (yellow card) 31'; DaCosta 46' del Rio (yellow card) 66'; Dunn 69'; Nairn 83' (pen.)	Box; Report	Corsie (yellow card) 20'	Stadium: Maureen Hendricks Field at Maryland SoccerPlex; Attendance: 5413; Referee: Christopher Spivey

July 22, 2015 13	Portland Thorns FC	0–1	Seattle Reign FC	Portland, Oregon
19:00 (PDT)		Box; Report	Little 57'; Cox (yellow card) 90+'	Stadium: Providence Park; Attendance: 21,144; Referee: Karen Abt

July 26, 2015 14	Seattle Reign FC	3–0	Portland Thorns FC	Seattle, Washington
16:00 (PDT)	Fishlock 38'; Yanez 46', 50'	Box; Report	Johnson (yellow card) 82'; Ayo (yellow card) 89'	Stadium: Memorial Stadium; Attendance: 6,303; Referee: Matthew Franz

August 1, 2015 15	Boston Breakers	1–2	Seattle Reign FC	Boston, Massachusetts
13:00 (PDT)	Mewis 34'; King (yellow card) 59' (yellow-red card) 82'	Box; Report	Yanez 24'; Little 59' (pen.), (yellow card) 65'	Stadium: Soldiers Field Soccer Stadium; Attendance: 4,325; Referee: Ekaterina Koroleva

August 12, 2015 16	Seattle Reign FC	2–1	Houston Dash	Seattle, Washington
19:00 (PDT)	Mathias 22'; Corsie 59'	Box; Report	Ohai 15'; Masar (yellow card) 70'; Brush (yellow card) 90+'	Stadium: Memorial Stadium; Attendance: 6,021; Referee: Cedric Adams

August 21, 2015 17	Houston Dash	0–3	Seattle Reign FC	Houston, Texas
17:00 (PDT)		Box; Report	Little 42', 74', 90'	Stadium: BBVA Compass Stadium; Attendance: 9,530; Referee: Christina Hutchinson

August 26, 2015 18	Seattle Reign FC	3–1	Boston Breakers	Seattle, Washington
19:00 (PDT)	Rapinoe 21' Fletcher 34' Little 56'	Box; Report	Evans 88'	Stadium: Memorial Stadium; Attendance: 4,484; Referee: David Mon

August 29, 2015 19	Seattle Reign FC	1–1	Sky Blue FC	Seattle, Washington
19:00 (PDT)	Winters (yellow card) 68'; Fishlock 90'	Box; Report	Nadim 6'; Haagsma (yellow card) 62'	Stadium: Memorial Stadium; Attendance: 4,471; Referee: Greg Dopka

September 5, 2015 20	Washington Spirit	1–2	Seattle Reign FC	Germantown, Maryland
16:00 (PDT)	Matheson 37' (pen.); Johnson (yellow card) 80'; Raso (yellow card) 88'	Box; Report	Fishlock 15'; Rapinoe 25'; Veje (yellow card) 54'; Little (yellow card) 77'	Stadium: Maureen Hendricks Field at Maryland SoccerPlex; Attendance: 5,708; Referee: Brandon Artis

==== Regular-season standings ====
Pos	Team	Pld	W	D	L	GF	GA	GD	Pts	Qualification
1	Seattle Reign FC	20	13	4	3	41	21	+20	43	NWSL Shield
2	Chicago Red Stars	20	8	9	3	31	22	+9	33	NWSL Playoffs
3	FC Kansas City (C)	20	9	5	6	32	20	+12	32	NWSL Playoffs
4	Washington Spirit	20	8	6	6	31	28	+3	30	NWSL Playoffs
5	Houston Dash	20	6	6	8	21	26	−5	24	
6	Portland Thorns FC	20	6	5	9	27	29	−2	23	
7	Western New York Flash	20	6	5	9	24	34	−10	23	
8	Sky Blue FC	20	5	7	8	22	28	−6	22	
9	Boston Breakers	20	4	3	13	22	43	−21	15	

Source: NWSL
Rules for classification: Tiebreakers
(C) Champions

===== Results summary =====
Overall								Home						Away					
Pld	Pts	W	L	T	GF	GA	GD	W	L	T	GF	GA	GD	W	L	T	GF	GA	GD
20	43	13	3	4	41	21	+20	8	0	2	26	8	+18	5	3	2	15	13	+2

Last updated: September 6, 2015
Source: http://www.nwslsoccer.com/teams/74415303/58150141-74415358/TEAM.html
Pld = Matches played; Pts = Points; W = Matches won; T = Matches tied; L = Matches lost; GF = Goals for; GA = Goals against; GD = Goal difference

===== Results by matchday =====
Round	1	2	3	4	5	6	7	8	9	10	11	12	13	14	15	16	17	18	19	20
Stadium	H	A	A	H	A	H	H	A	H	A	H	A	A	H	A	H	A	H	H	A
Result	W	L	L	W	D	D	W	W	W	D	W	L	W	W	W	W	W	W	D	W
Position	1	4	4	3	4	5	3	2	1	2	1	2	2	1	1	1	1	1	1	1

Updated to match(es) played on September 6, 2015. Source: http://www.nwslsoccer.com/Standings/index_E.html
A = Away; H = Home; W = Win; D = Draw; L = Loss

=== Playoffs ===
September 13, 2015 Semi-finals	Seattle Reign FC	3–0	Washington Spirit	Seattle, Washington
18:30 (PDT)	Mathias (yellow card) 52'; Yanez 71'; Rapinoe 75'; Bullock 90'	Box; Report		Stadium: Memorial Stadium; Attendance: 5,021; Referee: Christopher Spivey

October 1, 2015 Finals	Seattle Reign FC	0–1	FC Kansas City	Portland, Oregon
18:30 (PDT)		Box; Report	Sauerbrunn (yellow card) 76'; Rodriguez 78'	Stadium: Providence Park; Attendance: 13,624; Referee: Katja Koroleva

== Statistics ==
Numbers in parentheses denote appearances as substitute.

Last updated: October 5, 2015.
Source: http://www.nwslsoccer.com/Stats/index_E.html

No.	Pos.	Nat.	Name	Regular Season		Playoffs		Discipline (regular season)	
No.	Pos.	Nat.	Name	Apps	Goals	Apps	Goals	Yellow card	Red card
1	GK	(United States) USA	Hope Solo	8	0	2	0	0	0
3	DF	(United States) USA	Lauren Barnes	20	1	2	0	1	0
4	DF	(Scotland) SCO	Rachel Corsie	14 (2)	2	2	0	1	0
7	DF	(United States) USA	Elli Reed	9 (9)	0	0 (2)	0	0	0
8	MF	(Scotland) SCO	Kim Little	20	10	2	0	2	0
9	MF	(United States) USA	Merritt Mathias	17 (1)	2	2	0	1	0
10	MF	(Wales) WAL	Jess Fishlock	19	8	2	0	0	1
11	MF	(United States) USA	Keelin Winters	19	1	2	0	1	0
12	GK	(United States) USA	Caroline Stanley	1	0	0	0	0	0
13	DF	(United States) USA	Kendall Fletcher	19	2	2	0	0	0
14	DF	(United States) USA	Stephanie Cox	20	0	2	0	1	0
15	MF	(United States) USA	Megan Rapinoe	10	5	2	1	0	0
17	FW	(United States) USA	Beverly Yanez	17	9	1 (1)	1	0	0
18	FW	(United States) USA	Danielle Foxhoven	2 (14)	0	0	0	1	0
19	MF	(United States) USA	Havana Solaun	0	0	0	0	0	0
20	MF	(Samoa) SAM	Mariah Bullock	4 (9)	0	0 (1)	1	0	0
21	DF	(United States) USA	Michelle Cruz	0 (1)	0	0	0	0	0
22	MF	(United States) USA	Amber Brooks	4 (8)	1	0	0	0	0
24	FW	(Denmark) DEN	Katrine Veje	4 (5)	0	1 (1)	0	1	0
25	FW	(United States) USA	Kiersten Dallstream	2 (6)	0	0	0	0	0
28	GK	(United States) USA	Haley Kopmeyer	11	0	0	0	0	0
Players who left the club during the regular season
40	GK	(United States) USA	Abigail Steele	0	0	0	0	0	0

== Awards ==
=== 2015 FIFA Ballon d'Or ===
- FIFA Women's World Player of the Year: Megan Rapinoe, Hope Solo (nominees)
- FIFA World Coach of the Year for Women's Football: Laura Harvey (nominee)

=== FIFA FIFPro Women's World11 ===
- Hope Solo

=== BBC Women's Footballer of the Year ===
- Kim Little (finalist)

=== NWSL season awards ===
Award finalists announced on September 9.

- Coach of the Year: Laura Harvey, winner
- Defender of the Year, presented by Coppertone: Lauren Barnes, finalist; Kendall Fletcher, finalist
- MVP: Jess Fishlock, finalist; Kim Little, finalist; Beverly Yanez, finalist
- Best XI: Lauren Barnes, Jess Fishlock, Kim Little, Beverly Yanez
- Second XI: Stephanie Cox, Kendall Fletcher, Megan Rapinoe, Keelin Winters

=== Team season awards ===
Announced on October 5.

- MVP: Kim Little
- Best Attacker: Beverly Yanez
- Defender of the Year: Lauren Barnes
- Unsung Hero: Keelin Winters
- Goal of the Season: Little's third goal against Houston Dash on August 21
- Best on Social Media: Haley Kopmeyer

=== NWSL Player of the Month ===
- Kim Little, June 2015.

=== NWSL Player of the Week ===
- Megan Rapinoe, Week 1.
- Jess Fishlock, Week 9.
- Beverly Yanez, Week 15.
- Kim Little, Week 19.

=== Gene Juarez Salons & Spas Player of the Match ===
Team awards for select home matches only.

- Megan Rapinoe vs. Western New York Flash, April 12.
- Merritt Mathias vs. Washington Spirit, May 2.
- Beverly Yanez vs. China WNT, May 22.
- Jess Fishlock vs. Sky Blue FC, June 6.
- Kim Little vs. FC Kansas City, June 27.
- Beverly Yanez vs. Western New York Flash, July 11.
- Beverly Yanez vs. Portland Thorns FC, July 26.
- Rachel Corsie vs. Houston Dash, August 12.
- Megan Rapinoe vs. Boston Breakers, August 26.
- Jess Fishlock vs. Sky Blue FC, August 29.
- Beverly Yanez vs. Washington Spirit, September 13 (semi-finals).

== Transfers ==
For transfers in, dates listed are when the Reign FC officially signed the players to the roster. Transactions where only the rights to the players are acquired (e.g., draft picks) are not listed. For transfers out, dates listed are when the Reign FC officially removed the players from its roster, not when they signed with another club. If a player later signed with another club, her new club will be noted, but the date listed here remains the one when she was officially removed from the Reign FC roster.

=== In ===
Date	Player	Pos	Previous club	Notes	Ref
November 12, 2014	(United States) Merritt Mathias	MF	(United States) FC Kansas City	Traded for Kate Deines and Seattle's 16th and 26th draft picks in 2015	
November 14, 2014	(United States) Michelle Cruz	DF	(Cyprus) Apollon Limassol	Undisclosed	
January 13, 2015	(United States) Beverly Yanez	FW	(Japan) INAC Kobe Leonessa	Undisclosed	
January 21, 2015	(Denmark) Katrine Veje	FW	(Denmark) Brøndby	Undisclosed; will join the club on July 1	
January 27, 2015	(United States) Stephanie Cox	DF	(United States) Seattle Reign FC	Re-signed to a standard contract after being removed from allocation by U.S. Soccer	
January 29, 2015	(Scotland) Rachel Corsie	DF	(England) Notts County	Undisclosed	
March 30, 2015	(United States) Amber Brooks	MF	(United States) Western New York Flash	Traded along with WNY's first-round pick in 2016 and the rights to Abby Wambach for Sydney Leroux and Amanda Frisbie	
April 3, 2015	(United States) Havana Solaun	MF	(United States) Florida Gators	2015 2nd Round Pick (#15)	
July 22, 2015	(United States) Caroline Stanley	GK	(United States) USC Trojans	Signed as injury replacement for Hope Solo; previously an amateur call-up	
July 31, 2015	(United States) Abigail Steele	GK	(United States) Oregon Ducks	Signed as injury replacement for Haley Kopmeyer	

==== Draft picks ====
Draft picks are not automatically signed to the team roster. Only those who are signed to a contract will be listed as transfers in. Only trades involving draft picks and executed during the 2015 NWSL College Draft will be listed in the notes.

Date	Player	Pos	Previous club	Notes	Ref
January 16, 2015	(United States) Havana Solaun	MF	(United States) Florida Gators	2015 2nd Round Pick (#15)	
January 16, 2015	(United States) Kendall Romine	DF	(United States) Stanford Cardinal	2015 4th Round Pick (#36)	

=== Out ===
Date	Player	Pos	Destination Club	Notes	Ref
November 12, 2014	(United States) Kate Deines	DF	(United States) FC Kansas City	Traded along with Seattle's 16th and 26th draft picks in 2015 for the rights to Merritt Mathias	
January 14, 2015	(United States) Stephanie Cox	DF	(United States) Seattle Reign FC	Removed from allocation by U.S. Soccer	
January 14, 2015	(Canada) Carmelina Moscato	DF		Removed from allocation by CSA	
January 26, 2015	(United States) Megan Brigman	DF		Waived	
January 28, 2015	(United States) Holly Hein	DF		Waived	
March 30, 2015	(United States) Amanda Frisbie	FW	(United States) Western New York Flash	Traded along with Sydney Leroux for Amber Brooks, WNY's first-round pick in 2016, and the rights to Abby Wambach	
March 30, 2015	(United States) Sydney Leroux	FW	(United States) Western New York Flash	Traded along with Amanda Frisbie for Amber Brooks, WNY's first-round pick in 2016, and the rights to Abby Wambach	
August 2, 2015	(United States) Abigail Steele	GK		Waived after Hope Solo returned from injury after the match at Boston Breakers	

=== Offseason loans ===
- Rachel Corsie to Glasgow City FC
- Jess Fishlock to Melbourne City WFC (as player and assistant manager)
- Kendall Fletcher to Canberra United FC
- Haley Kopmeyer to Brisbane Roar
- Kim Little to Melbourne City WFC
- Keelin Winters to Western Sydney Wanderers FC

== See also ==
- 2015 National Women's Soccer League season
