= 2014 Seattle Reign FC season =

Seattle Reign FC
2014 season
- Owners: Bill and Teresa Predmore
- General manager: Laura Harvey
- Head coach: Laura Harvey
- Stadium: Memorial Stadium
- NWSL: Overall: 1st place Playoffs: Runners-up
- Top goalscorer: League: Kim Little (16); All: Kim Little (17)
- Highest home attendance: 5,957 vs Portland Thorns FC (July 27, 2014)
- Lowest home attendance: 1,754 vs Washington Spirit (April 23, 2014)
Home colors	Away colors

The 2014 Seattle Reign FC season was the club's second season of play and their second season in the National Women's Soccer League, the top division of women's soccer in the United States.

== Review and events ==
=== Preseason ===
Following an inaugural 2013 season that saw the team finish 7th out of 8 teams, the roster was significantly overhauled by Head Coach and GM Laura Harvey, with only 9 players returning for the 2014 season. In November, the team acquired US National team forward Sydney Leroux in a trade with the Boston Breakers. Two days later, they signed Scottish international Kim Little — who had previously played for Harvey at Arsenal — after acquiring her NWSL rights in a trade with the Washington Spirit.

In the January 2014 NWSL College Draft, the team selected Amanda Frisbie of Portland (1st round), Megan Brigman of North Carolina (2nd round), and Ellen Parker of Portland (4th round). In February, they announced that they would be moving home stadiums from Starfire Sports in Tukwila to Memorial Stadium, located near downtown Seattle in Seattle Center. On February 10 they announced the signing of their third international player, adding Japanese national team midfielder Nahomi Kawasumi on loan from Japanese club side INAC Kobe Leonessa.

=== Regular season ===
During the 2014 season, the Reign set a league record unbeaten streak of 16 games. During the 16 game stretch, the Reign compiled a 13–0–3 record. The streak came to an end July 12, 2014, in a match against the Chicago Red Stars that ended 1–0 in favor of the Red Stars. The team finished first in the regular season clinching the NWSL Shield for the first time. Following the regular season, the team earned several league awards. Kim Little won the Golden Boot and Most Valuable Player awards; Laura Harvey was named Coach of the Year; Kendall Fletcher, Jess Fishlock, Little and Nahomi Kawasumi were named to the NWSL Best XI team while goalkeeper Hope Solo and defenders Lauren Barnes and Stephanie Cox were named to the Second XI team.

=== Playoffs ===
After defeating the Washington Spirit 2–1 in the playoff semi-finals, the Reign were defeated 2-1 by FC Kansas City during the championship final.

== Club ==
=== Coaching staff ===
Position	Staff
General Manager & Head Coach	(England) Laura Harvey
Assistant Coach	(England) Sam Laity
Goalkeeper Coach	(United States) Ben Dragavon

Last updated: April 4, 2014

=== Roster ===
Note: Flags indicate national team as defined under FIFA eligibility rules; some limited exceptions apply. Players may hold more than one non-FIFA nationality.

No.	Pos.	Nation	Player
3	DF	USA	Lauren Barnes
23	DF	USA	Megan Brigman
14	DF	USA	Stephanie Cox
25	DF	USA	Kiersten Dallstream
4	DF	USA	Kate Deines
10	MF	WAL	Jess Fishlock
13	DF	USA	Kendall Fletcher
12	DF	USA	Amanda Frisbie
18	MF	USA	Danielle Foxhoven
17	FW	USA	Beverly Goebel (on loan from INAC Kobe Leonessa)
19	DF	USA	Holly Hein

No.	Pos.	Nation	Player
9	MF	JPN	Nahomi Kawasumi (on loan from INAC Kobe Leonessa)
28	GK	USA	Haley Kopmeyer
2	FW	USA	Sydney Leroux
8	MF	SCO	Kim Little
5	DF	CAN	Carmelina Moscato
20	MF	SAM	Mariah Nogueira
15	MF	USA	Megan Rapinoe
7	DF	USA	Elli Reed
1	GK	USA	Hope Solo
11	MF	USA	Keelin Winters (captain)

== Competitions ==
Win Tie Loss

=== Preseason ===
April 3, 2014	Washington Huskies	0-5	Seattle Reign FC	Seattle, Washington
19:00 PDT		UW report highlights coach's interview players' interviews	Deines 12'; Foxhoven 43'; Fletcher; Goebel 73'; Patterson 87'	Stadium: Husky Soccer Stadium

April 5, 2014	Seattle Reign FC	8-0	Seattle Pacific Falcons	Seattle, Washington
18:00 PDT	Foxhoven 7', 37'; Kawasumi 32'; Goebel 45' (pen.); LaPonte 73'; Deines 74'; Patterson	highlights coach's interview players' interviews		Stadium: Memorial Stadium

=== Regular season ===
April 13, 2014 1	Seattle Reign FC	3–0	Boston Breakers	Seattle, Washington
16:00 (PDT)	Little 49' (pen.), 54'; Winters (yellow card) 59'; Rapinoe (yellow card) 82', (goal) 88'	Report	Avant (yellow card) 43'; Jones (yellow card) 56'	Stadium: Memorial Stadium; Attendance: 3,021; Referee: Katja Koroleva

April 23, 2014 2	Seattle Reign FC	3–1	Washington Spirit	Seattle, Washington
19:00 (PDT)	Fletcher 3'; Winters 48'; Fishlock 80'	Report	Averbuch (yellow card) 56'; Matheson 73' (pen.), (yellow card) 87'	Stadium: Memorial Stadium; Attendance: 1,754; Referee: Josh Wilkens

April 27, 2014 3	Seattle Reign FC	2–0	Houston Dash	Seattle, Washington
16:00 (PDT)	Little 19' (pen.), 38'; Reed (yellow card) 36'; Winters (yellow card) 63'	Report	Masar (yellow card) 2'; Ohale (yellow card) 77'	Stadium: Memorial Stadium; Attendance: 2,290; Referee: Dimitar Chavdarov

April 30, 2014 4	Sky Blue FC	0–2	Seattle Reign FC	Piscataway, New Jersey
16:00 (PDT)	Levin (yellow card) 64'	Report	Kawasumi 24'; Goebel 50'	Stadium: Yurcak Field; Attendance: 582; Referee: Matthew Franz

May 3, 2014 5	Washington Spirit	1–2	Seattle Reign FC	Boyds, Maryland
16:30 (PDT)	Krieger 53'	Report	Fishlock 55'; Leroux 76'	Stadium: Maryland SoccerPlex; Attendance: 4,667; Referee: Elvis Mahmutovic

May 10, 2014 6	Portland Thorns FC	0–1	Seattle Reign FC	Portland, Oregon
19:00 (PDT)	Brooks (yellow card) 22'	Report	Little 90'	Stadium: Providence Park; Attendance: 14,128; Referee: Boris Senic

May 14, 2014 7	Seattle Reign FC	3–2	FC Kansas City	Seattle, Washington
19:00 (PDT)	Fletcher 16'; Little 20' (pen.); Fishlock (yellow card) 52'; Winters 76'	Report	Holiday 44' (pen.); Tymrak 61'	Stadium: Memorial Stadium; Attendance: 2,875; Referee: Timon Berry

May 21, 2014 8	FC Kansas City	1–1	Seattle Reign FC	Kansas City, Missouri
16:00 (PDT)	Richmond (yellow card) 18'; Rodriguez 42'	Report	Winters (yellow card) 34'; Little 45+1' (pen.); Barnes (yellow card) 78'	Stadium: Durwood Soccer Stadium; Attendance: 2,011; Referee: Dimitar Chavdarov

May 25, 2014 9	Seattle Reign FC	2–2	Western New York Flash	Seattle, Washington
16:00 (PDT)	Fishlock 45' (yellow card) 65'; Little 90+2'	Report	Wambach 17'; Lloyd 62' (yellow card) 73'	Stadium: Memorial Stadium; Attendance: 4,018; Referee: Josh Wilkens

June 1, 2014 10	Sky Blue FC	1–3	Seattle Reign FC	Piscataway, New Jersey
15:00 (PDT)	Freels 42'	Report	Leroux (yellow card) 35'; Kawasumi 50', 74'; Little 53'	Stadium: Yurcak Field; Attendance: 2,876; Referee: Christina Unkel

June 7, 2014 11	Seattle Reign FC	3–1	Chicago Red Stars	Seattle, Washington
19:00 (PDT)	Barnes (yellow card) 26' Goebel (yellow card) 38'; Leroux (yellow card) 47' (goal) 69'; Little 65' (pen.), 77' (pen.) Nogueira (yellow card)	Report; Box Score	Johnston (yellow card) 7' Wenino (yellow card) 45'; Sitch (yellow card) 53' van Egmond 62'; Johnson (yellow card) Quon (yellow card)	Stadium: Memorial Stadium; Attendance: 4,222; Referee: Dimitar Chavdarov

June 19, 2014 12	Boston Breakers	0–2	Seattle Reign FC	Boston, Massachusetts
16:00 (PDT)		Report	Goebel 4'; Winters 25'	Stadium: Harvard Stadium; Attendance: 2,714; Referee: David Mon

June 22, 2014 13	Western New York Flash	1–2	Seattle Reign FC	Rochester, New York
12:00 (PDT)	Edmonds (yellow card) 12' Kerr 61'; Salem (yellow card) 77'; Zerboni (yellow card) 86' Reynolds (yellow card) 92'	Report	Lloyd 83' (o.g.); Leroux 88'	Stadium: Sahlen's Stadium; Attendance: 3,444; Referee: Boris Senic

June 28, 2014 14	Seattle Reign FC	0–0	Sky Blue FC	Seattle, Washington
18:00 (PDT)		Report	Foord (yellow card) 54'	Stadium: Memorial Stadium; Attendance: 5,770; Referee: Chris Spivey

July 2, 2014 15	Western New York Flash	1–2	Seattle Reign FC	Rochester, New York
16:00 (PDT)	Losada 33'		Goebel 62'; Fishlock 85'	Stadium: Sahlen's Stadium

July 6, 2014 16	Seattle Reign FC	3–2	Boston Breakers	Seattle, Washington
16:00 (PDT)	Kawasumi 55', 83'; Little 76'		Jones 19'; Schoepfer 78' (yellow card) 90+1'	Stadium: Memorial Stadium; Attendance: 3705; Referee: Mark Allatin

July 12, 2014 17	Chicago Red Stars	1–0	Seattle Reign FC	Lisle, Illinois
19:00 CDT (UTC−05)	Tancredi 8'; Abby Erceg (yellow card) 60'; Bywaters (yellow card) 85'	Report	Reed (yellow card) 80'	Stadium: Village of Lisle-Benedictine University Sports Complex; Attendance: 3,032; Referee: Margaret Domka

July 20, 2014 18	Seattle Reign FC	1–1	Chicago Red Stars	Seattle, Washington
16:00 (PDT)	Rapinoe (yellow card) 38'; Goebel 70'		Johnston (yellow card) 69'; Press 81'	Stadium: Memorial Stadium; Attendance: 3030; Referee: David Mon

July 27, 2014 19	Seattle Reign FC	5–0	Portland Thorns FC	Seattle, Washington
16:00 (PDT)	Leroux 4'; Winters (yellow card) 10'; Kawasumi 39' 49'; Rapinoe 57'; Little 90+3'	Summary		Stadium: Memorial Stadium; Attendance: 5,957; Referee: Boris Senic

July 30, 2014 20	Houston Dash	1–4	Seattle Reign FC	Houston, Texas
18:00 (PDT)	Ohai 56'		Leroux 2'; Little 27', 78'; Rapinoe 48'	Stadium: BBVA Compass Stadium; Attendance: 4862; Referee: Timon Berry

August 2, 2014 21	FC Kansas City	1–1	Seattle Reign FC	Kansas City, Missouri
16:00 (PDT)	Rodriguez 6'; LePeilbet (yellow card) 46'		Rapinoe 68'; Nogueira (yellow card) 86'	Stadium: Durwood Soccer Stadium; Attendance: 3029; Referee: Bernard Hosu

August 6, 2014 22	Seattle Reign FC	4–1	Houston Dash	Seattle, Washington
19:00 (PDT)	Kawasumi 31', 34'; Goebel 40'; Little 63'		Jackson 83'	Stadium: Memorial Stadium; Attendance: 3875; Referee: Michael Zapata

August 9, 2014 23	Seattle Reign FC	1–1	Washington Spirit	Seattle, Washington
19:00 (PDT)	Kim Little 89'	Report	Diana Matheson 29'	Stadium: Memorial Stadium; Attendance: 3,479; Referee: Elvis Mahmutovic

August 17, 2014 24	Portland Thorns FC	1–0	Seattle Reign FC	Portland, Oregon
14:00 (PDT)	Alex Morgan 68'	Report		Stadium: Providence Park; Attendance: 17,109; Referee: Elvis Mahmutovic

==== Regular-season standings ====
Pos	Team	Pld	W	D	L	GF	GA	GD	Pts	Qualification
1	Seattle Reign FC	24	16	6	2	50	20	+30	54	NWSL Shield
2	FC Kansas City (C)	24	12	5	7	39	32	+7	41	NWSL Playoffs
3	Portland Thorns FC	24	10	6	8	39	35	+4	36	NWSL Playoffs
4	Washington Spirit	24	10	5	9	36	43	−7	35	NWSL Playoffs
5	Chicago Red Stars	24	9	8	7	32	26	+6	35	
6	Sky Blue FC	24	9	7	8	30	37	−7	34	
7	Western New York Flash	24	8	4	12	42	38	+4	28	
8	Boston Breakers	24	6	2	16	37	53	−16	20	
9	Houston Dash	24	5	3	16	23	44	−21	18	

Source: NWSL
Rules for classification: Tiebreakers
(C) Champions

===== Results summary =====
Overall								Home						Away					
Pld	Pts	W	L	T	GF	GA	GD	W	L	T	GF	GA	GD	W	L	T	GF	GA	GD
24	54	16	2	6	50	20	+30	8	0	4	30	10	+20	8	2	2	20	10	+10

Last updated: September 5, 2014
Pld = Matches played; Pts = Points; W = Matches won; T = Matches tied; L = Matches lost; GF = Goals for; GA = Goals against; GD = Goal difference

===== Results by matchday =====
Round	1	2	3	4	5	6	7	8	9	10	11	12	13	14	15	16	17	18	19	20	21	22	23	24
Stadium	H	H	H	A	A	A	H	A	H	A	H	A	A	H	A	H	A	H	H	A	A	H	H	A
Result	W	W	W	W	W	W	W	D	D	W	W	W	W	D	W	W	L	D	W	W	D	W	D	L
Position (Note: SRFC's position at the end of the day in which their match was played.)	1	1	1	1	1	1	1	1	1	1	1	1	1	1	1	1	1	1	1	1	1	1	1	1

Updated to match(es) played on September 5, 2014. Source: nwslsoccer.com
A = Away; H = Home; W = Win; D = Draw; L = Loss

=== Playoffs ===
August 25, 2014 Semi-final	Seattle Reign FC	2–1	Washington Spirit	Seattle
20:00 PDT	Little 72' (pen.); Rapinoe 82'; Fletcher (yellow card) 90+5'	Report	Averbuch (yellow card) 31'; Pérez 65'; Nairn (yellow card) 90+2'	Stadium: Memorial Stadium; Attendance: 4,540; Referee: Timon Berry

August 31, 2014 Final	Seattle Reign FC	1–2	FC Kansas City	Tukwila, Washington
12:00 PDT	Rapinoe 86'; Solo (yellow card) 90+3'	Report	Rodriguez 22', 56'; LePeilbet (yellow card) 79'	Stadium: Starfire Stadium; Attendance: 4,252; Referee: Margaret Domka

== Statistics ==
=== Goals and assists ===
Numbers in parentheses denote appearances as substitute.

As of match played August 31, 2014

No.	Pos.	Name	NWSL Regular Season			NWSL Playoffs			Total		
No.	Pos.	Name	Apps	Goals	Assists	Apps	Goals	Assists	Apps	Goals	Assists
3	DF	(United States) Lauren Barnes	23	0	0	2	0	0	25	0	0
23	DF	(United States) Megan Brigman	2	0	0	0	0	0	2	0	0
14	DF	(United States) Stephanie Cox	21	0	1	2	0	0	23	0	1
25	DF	(United States) Kiersten Dallstream	15	0	1	0	0	0	15	0	1
4	DF	(United States) Kate Deines	18	0	0	1	0	0	19	0	0
10	MF	(Wales) Jess Fishlock	22	4	8	2	0	0	24	4	4
13	DF	(United States) Kendall Fletcher	23	2	1	2	0	0	25	2	1
18	FW	(United States) Danielle Foxhoven	12	0	0	0	0	0	12	0	0
12	DF	(United States) Amanda Frisbie	0	0	0	0	0	0	0	0	0
17	FW	(United States) Beverly Goebel	24	5	4	2	0	0	26	5	4
19	DF	(United States) Holly Hein	0	0	0	0	0	0	0	0	0
9	FW	(Japan) Nahomi Kawasumi	20	9	5	2	0	0	22	9	5
28	GK	(United States) Haley Kopmeyer	4	0	0	0	0	0	4	0	0
2	FW	(United States) Sydney Leroux	22	5	0	2	0	0	24	5	0
8	MF	(Scotland) Kim Little	23	16	7	2	1	0	25	17	7
5	DF	(Canada) Carmelina Moscato	1	0	0	0	0	0	1	0	0
20	MF	(Samoa) Mariah Nogueira	15	0	1	1	0	0	16	0	1
15	FW	(United States) Megan Rapinoe	9	4	1	2	2	0	11	6	1
7	DF	(United States) Elli Reed	22	0	1	2	0	0	24	0	1
1	GK	(United States) Hope Solo	20	0	0	2	0	0	22	0	0
11	MF	(United States) Keelin Winters	23	3	0	2	0	1	25	3	1
Own goal		(United States) Carli Lloyd (WNY)		1						1	
Total			---	46	30	---	3	1	---	49	31

=== Disciplinary record ===
As of match played August 31, 2014

No.	Pos.	Name	NWSL Regular Season			NWSL Playoffs			Total		
No.	Pos.	Name	Yellow card	(yellow card) (yellow-red card)	Red card	Yellow card	(yellow card) (yellow-red card)	Red card	Yellow card	(yellow card) (yellow-red card)	Red card
3	DF	(United States) Lauren Barnes	2	0	0	0	0	0	2	0	0
23	DF	(United States) Megan Brigman	0	0	0	0	0	0	0	0	0
14	DF	(United States) Stephanie Cox	0	0	0	0	0	0	0	0	0
25	DF	(United States) Kiersten Dallstream	0	0	0	0	0	0	0	0	0
4	DF	(United States) Kate Deines	1	0	0	0	0	0	1	0	0
10	MF	(Wales) Jess Fishlock	4	0	0	0	0	0	4	0	0
13	DF	(United States) Kendall Fletcher	0	0	0	1	0	0	1	0	0
18	FW	(United States) Danielle Foxhoven	0	0	0	0	0	0	0	0	0
12	DF	(United States) Amanda Frisbie	0	0	0	0	0	0	0	0	0
17	FW	(United States) Beverly Goebel	1	0	0	0	0	0	1	0	0
19	DF	(United States) Holly Hein	0	0	0	0	0	0	0	0	0
9	FW	(Japan) Nahomi Kawasumi	0	0	0	0	0	0	0	0	0
28	GK	(United States) Haley Kopmeyer	0	0	0	0	0	0	0	0	0
2	FW	(United States) Sydney Leroux	2	0	0	0	0	0	2	0	0
8	MF	(Scotland) Kim Little	2	0	0	0	0	0	2	0	0
5	DF	(Canada) Carmelina Moscato	0	0	0	0	0	0	0	0	0
20	MF	(Samoa) Mariah Nogueira	2	0	0	0	0	0	2	0	0
15	FW	(United States) Megan Rapinoe	3	0	0	0	0	0	3	0	0
7	DF	(United States) Elli Reed	3	0	0	0	0	0	3	0	0
1	GK	(United States) Hope Solo	0	0	0	1	0	0	1	0	0
11	MF	(United States) Keelin Winters	5	0	0	0	0	0	5	0	0
Total			25	0	0	2	0	0	27	0	0

== Awards ==
=== 2014 FIFA Ballon d'Or ===
- FIFA Women's World Player of the Year: Nahomi Kawasumi (nominee)
- FIFA World Coach of the Year for Women's Football: Laura Harvey (nominee)

=== Season Awards ===
- NWSL Golden Boot – Kim Little (16 goals)
- NWSL Coach of the Year – Laura Harvey
- NWSL Most Valuable Player – Kim Little
- NWSL Best XI – Kendall Fletcher, Jess Fishlock, Kim Little, Nahomi Kawasumi
- NWSL Second XI – Hope Solo, Lauren Barnes, Stephanie Cox

=== NWSL Player of the Month ===
- Kim Little, April 2014.
- Kim Little, May 2014.
- Kim Little, July 2014.

=== NWSL Player of the Week ===
- Sydney Leroux, Week 4
- Nahomi Kawasumi, Week 13, 16

=== Player of the Match ===
(Team awards for select matches)

- Kim Little vs. Boston Breakers, April 13, 2014.
- Jess Fishlock vs. Washington Spirit, April 23, 2014.
- Kim Little vs. Houston Dash, April 27, 2014.
- Kim Little and Hope Solo at Portland Thorns FC, May 10, 2014.
- Keelin Winters vs. FC Kansas City, May 14, 2014.
- Sydney Leroux vs. Chicago Red Stars, June 7, 2014.
- Nahomi Kawasumi vs. Boston Breakers, July 6, 2014.
- Beverly Goebel vs Chicago Red Stars, July 20, 2014.
- Nahomi Kawasumi vs. Portland Thorns FC, July 27, 2014.
- Hope Solo vs. Washington Spirit, August 24, 2014 (Playoff semifinal)

== Transfers ==
=== In ===
Date	Player	Pos	Previous club	Notes	Ref
September 10, 2013	(Canada) Carmelina Moscato	DF	Boston Breakers	Traded for Kaylyn Kyle	
October 23, 2013	(Samoa) Mariah Nogueira	MF	Boston Breakers	Traded for Seattle's 3rd round draft pick in 2014 and 3rd round draft pick in 2015	
October 25, 2013	(United States) Nikki Marshall	DF	Washington Spirit	Traded along with Washington's 2014 3rd round pick and the NWSL rights to Alina Garciamendez for Renae Cuellar, Seattle's 2014 3rd round draft pick and the rights to Jodie Taylor	
November 7, 2013	(United States) Kristie Mewis	MF	FC Kansas City	Traded for the rights to Amy Rodriguez	
November 18, 2013	(United States) Sydney Leroux	FW	Boston Breakers	Traded for Kristie Mewis, Michelle Betos, and Seattle's 1st and 2nd round picks in the 2015 draft	
November 20, 2013	(Scotland) Kim Little	MF	Arsenal LFC	Signed as an International free agent	
November 26, 2013	(United States) Danielle Foxhoven	FW	Portland Thorns FC	Traded for Jessica McDonald and the NWSL rights to Rebecca Moros	
December 5, 2013	(United States) Beverly Goebel	FW	INAC Kobe Leonessa	Acquired on loan for the 2014 season	
January 3, 2014	(Mexico) Arianna Romero	DF	Nebraska Cornhuskers	New allocation from FMF	
February 10, 2014	(Japan) Nahomi Kawasumi	MF	INAC Kobe Leonessa	Acquired on loan for the 2014 season	
February 11, 2014	(United States) Kendall Fletcher	DF	Canberra United	Signed as a free agent	
February 12, 2014	(United States) Amanda Frisbie	DF	Portland Pilots	Seattle's 1st round draft pick	
February 13, 2014	(United States) Haley Kopmeyer	GK		Signed as a free agent	
March 14, 2014	(United States) Niki Cross	DF	FC Bayern Munich	Signed and immediately traded to Washington for a 2nd round draft pick.	
March 31, 2014	(United States) Megan Brigman	DF	North Carolina Tar Heels	Seattle's 2nd round draft pick	
July 30, 2014	(United States) Holly Hein	DF		Signed as a free agent	

=== Out ===
Date	Player	Pos	Destination Club	Notes	Ref
September 9, 2013	(United States) Kristina Larsen	MF		Included in end-of-season Waiver Draft	
September 9, 2013	(United States) Kristen Meier	MF		Included in end-of-season Waiver Draft	
September 10, 2013	(Canada) Kaylyn Kyle	MF	Boston Breakers	Traded for Carmelina Moscato	
October 25, 2013	(Mexico) Renae Cuellar	FW	Washington Spirit	Traded along with Seattle's 2014 3rd round draft pick and the rights to Jodie Taylor for Nikki Marshall, Washington's 2014 3rd round pick, and the NWSL rights to Alina Garciamendez	
November 5, 2013	(Australia) Emily van Egmond	FW		Waived	
November 18, 2013	(United States) Kristie Mewis	MF	Boston Breakers	Traded along with Michelle Betos and Seattle's 1st and 2nd round picks in the 2015 draft for Sydney Leroux	
November 18, 2013	(United States) Michelle Betos	GK	Boston Breakers	Traded along with Kristie Mewis and Seattle's 1st and 2nd round picks in the 2015 draft for Sydney Leroux	
November 20, 2013	(United States) Christine Nairn	MF	Washington Spirit	Traded for the NWSL rights to Kim Little	
November 26, 2013	(United States) Jessica McDonald	FW	Portland Thorns FC	Traded along with the NWSL rights to Rebecca Moros for Danielle Foxhoven	
December 5, 2013	(United States) Liz Bogus	FW	FC Kansas City	Traded along with Seattle's 3rd round 2014 draft pick for Kansas City's 2nd round 2014 and 3rd round 2015 draft picks	
December 10, 2013	(United States) Nikki Marshall	DF	Portland Thorns FC	Traded along with Seattle's 2nd round 2014 draft pick for Portland's 1st round 2014 and 2nd round 2015 draft picks	
January 3, 2014	(Mexico) Jenny Ruiz	DF		Removed from allocation by FMF	
January 3, 2014	(Canada) Emily Zurrer	DF		Removed from allocation by CSA	
January 10, 2014	(Mexico) Arianna Romero	DF	Houston Dash	Selected by Houston in 2014 NWSL Expansion Draft	
March 14, 2014	(United States) Niki Cross	DF	Washington Spirit	Signed and immediately traded to Washington for a 2nd round draft pick.	

== Squad statistics ==
Note: only regular season squad statistics displayed

Key to positions: FW – Forward, MF – Midfielder, DF – Defender, GK – Goalkeeper

N	Pos	Player	GP	GS	Min	G	A	WG	Shot	SOG	Cro	CK	Off	Foul	FS	YC	RC
3	DF	Lauren Barnes	23	22	1898	0	0	0	3	2	0	0	0	7	7	2	0
23	DF	Megan Brigman	2	0	17	0	0	0	0	0	0	0	0	0	0	0	0
14	DF	Stephanie Cox	21	20	1776	0	1	0	5	1	8	0	1	5	9	0	0
25	DF	Kiersten Dallstream	15	8	768	0	1	0	8	2	9	0	1	1	2	0	0
4	DF	Kate Deines	18	9	859	0	0	0	4	1	0	0	0	8	3	1	0
10	MF	Jessica Fishlock	22	22	1976	4	8	1	45	17	3	1	2	23	33	4	0
13	DF	Kendall Fletcher	23	22	1917	2	1	0	10	7	1	0	0	10	5	0	0
18	DF	Danielle Foxhoven	12	3	340	0	0	0	2	1	0	0	2	6	3	0	0
17	FW	Beverly Goebel	24	21	1736	5	4	1	49	23	7	0	18	11	27	1	0
9	FW	Nahomi Kawasumi	20	17	1531	9	5	3	41	29	5	72	9	1	15	0	0
2	FW	Sydney Leroux	22	21	1873	5	0	4	51	20	1	1	15	11	21	2	0
8	MF	Kim Little	23	22	1966	16	7	5	42	31	9	19	14	7	25	0	0
5	DF	Carmelina Moscato	1	0	12	0	0	0	0	0	0	0	0	0	0	0	0
20	MF	Mariah Nogueira	15	6	588	0	1	0	3	1	1	0	0	11	5	2	0
15	FW	Megan Rapinoe	9	6	567	4	1	0	24	10	1	15	5	14	9	3	0
7	DF	Elli Reed	22	19	1813	0	1	0	4	1	9	1	2	19	9	3	0
11	MF	Keelin Winters	23	22	1963	3	0	2	12	6	1	0	0	15	12	5	0

N	Pos	Goal keeper	GP	GS	Min	W	L	T	Shot	SOG	Sav	GA	GA/G	Pen	PKF	SO
28	GK	Haley Kopmeyer	4	4	360	3	0	1	27	19	17	2	0.500	0	0	2
1	GK	Hope Solo	20	20	1800	13	2	5	162	83	65	18	0.900	2	3	5

== See also ==
- 2014 National Women's Soccer League season
