= Danielle Foxhoven =

American soccer player (born 1989)

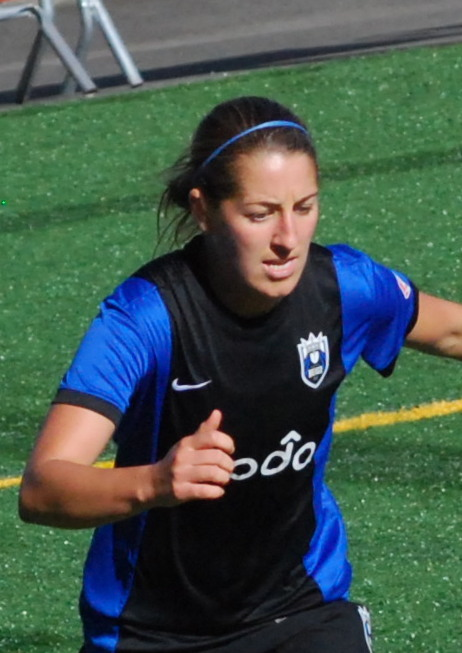
- Foxhoven (2014)

Personal information
- Full name: Danielle Lauren Foxhoven
- Date of birth: November 9, 1989 (age 36)
- Place of birth: Littleton, Colorado
- Height: 5 ft 6 in (1.68 m)
- Positions: Forward; midfielder

College career
Years	Team	Apps	(Gls)
2008–2011	Portland Pilots	87	(57)

Senior career*
Years	Team	Apps	(Gls)
2010–2011	Colorado Rush	7	(3)
2012	FC Energy Voronezh	9	(6)
2013	Portland Thorns FC	21	(4)
2014–15	Seattle Reign FC	18	(0)

International career
2006–2007	United States U-17		
2008	United States U-20		
2010–2012	United States U-23	4	(2)

Managerial career
- 2016–2017: Purdue University Northwest
- * Club domestic league appearances and goals

Danielle Lauren Foxhoven (born November 9, 1989) is an American college soccer coach and retired professional women's soccer forward. She most recently played for Seattle Reign FC of the National Women's Soccer League and previously played for Portland Thorns FC as well as Russian side, FC Energy Voronezh.

== Early life ==
Born to Brian and Bunny Foxhoven, Danielle was raised in Littleton, Colorado. She attended and played for J.K. Mullen High School in Denver, where she received several honors and awards during her time. Foxhoven was named the High School Athletic Association Player of the Year in 2006 and 2007, Denver Post and Rocky Mountain News Player of the Year in 2007, Colorado Sportswoman of the Year for Soccer in 2007 and 2008, NSCAA Youth All-America Team as a junior and senior, All-Centennial League First Team each season she played, and a 2008 Parade Magazine All-American. Foxhoven helped lead her team to 5A State Championship in 2007. Foxhoven played three seasons at J.K. Mullen, eventually leaving to focus on her club career. Foxhoven was a member of the Colorado Rush youth system dating back as early as 1994 and the Colorado Rush Nike team from 1999. She scored six goals and earned the adidas Golden Boot as Most Valuable Player by leading her team to the 2008 U.S. Youth Soccer (USYS) National Championship. Foxhoven also guided the team to the 2009 USYS title and to six Colorado State Championships, helped the squad to the 2008 Disney Showcase title, Region IV runner-up 2004, regional semifinals in 2005, and earned State MVP honors in 2002, 2004 and 2007. Foxhoven was named the Colorado Rush Female Player of the Year 2007.

=== Portland Pilots, 2008–11 ===
Foxhoven attended University of Portland, where she majored in Marketing and Management. From 2008 to 2011, she played for the Portland Pilots women's soccer team and finished her collegiate career ranked fourth on the team's all-time scoring list with 57 goals and 25 assists (139 points). During her freshman season, Foxhoven led the Pilots and the West Coast Conference (WCC) in scoring with 16 goals and six assists for a total of 38 points. Five of her goals and one assist occurred during the Husky/Nike Invitational Tournament in Seattle for which she earned TopDrawerSoccer.com National Player of the Week and WCC Player of the Week honors. She was named to Soccer America and Top Drawer Soccer First Team Freshman All-American as well as WCC Freshman of the Year. During her sophomore season, Foxhoven's 62 points tied for fourth-best in school history and she led the team in scoring with 25 goals. Her 12 assists tied for first on the team as well. She was named to the All-WCC First Team, WCC All-Academic First Team and Top Drawer Soccer Team of the Season – First Team. The following year in 2010, Foxhoven tied for first on the team in goals, assists and points (8, 5, and 21 respectively). Her successful penalty kick during a match against Penn State tied her with former Pilot and Canadian international Christine Sinclair for most converted and attempted penalty kicks in the team's history.

== Club career ==
=== Colorado Rush, 2010–11 ===
Foxhoven played for the senior Colorado Rush team in the USL W-League in 2010 and 2011.

=== FC Energy Voronezh, 2012 ===
Foxhoven was selected 17th overall by the Philadelphia Independence in the 2012 WPS draft but the league folded two weeks before she was due to report for preseason. Following the folding of the WPS, Foxhoven signed on to play for the Russian side FC Energy Voronezh, where she scored 6 goals in 9 appearances. During a match against Kubanochka on April 26, 2012, Foxhoven scored a hat-trick.

=== Portland Thorns FC, 2013 ===
Foxhoven was signed by the Portland Thorns FC as a discovery player headed into their inaugural 2013 season with the National Women's Soccer League. She scored four goals during the season, netting three of them after subbing in during the second half of three different matches. Her first goal of the season occurred during the team's 2–0 defeat of the Chicago Red Stars on April 27, 2013. During the team's last home game of the regular season against FC Kansas City, Foxhoven scored an equalizer in the 51st minute of the match to even the score to 1–1; however, Kansas City ultimately defeated the Thorns 3–2 in a very close match. After finishing in third place during the regular season, the Thorns clinched the league championship title after defeating regular season leaders Western New York Flash 2–0. Thorns head coach Cindy Parlow Cone said of Foxhoven's performance during the season, "Serving as one of our main options off the bench, Dani worked her way into the starting lineup later in the season and played an important role in helping us win the championship in our first season." Foxhoven finished the season having made appearances in 21 games with 8 starts and ranked fifth on the team in points.

=== Seattle Reign FC, 2014–16 ===
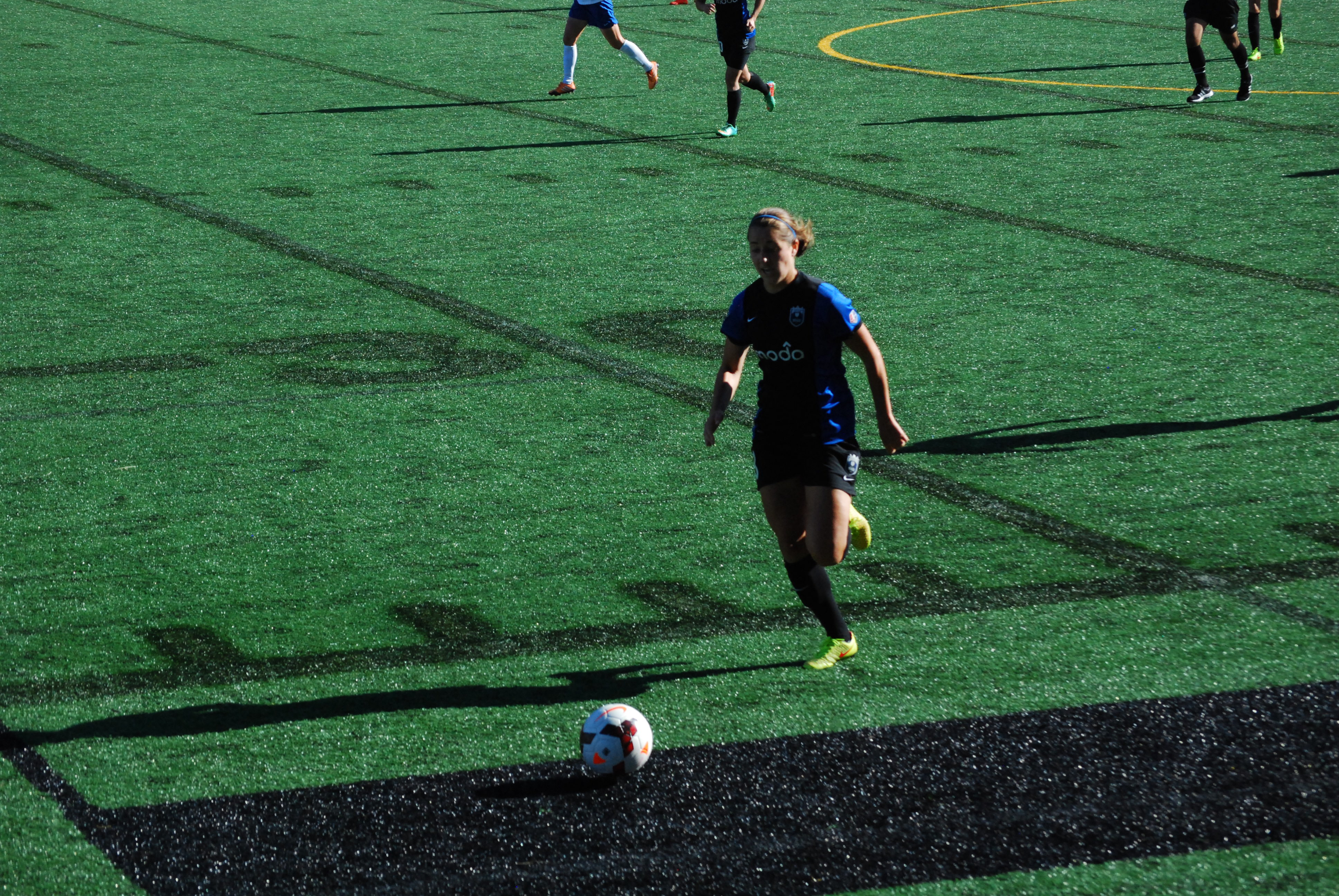
Foxhoven played for Seattle Reign FC in 2014 and 2015

In November 2013, Foxhoven was traded to the Seattle Reign FC in exchange for forward Jessica McDonald and the player rights for defender Rebecca Moros. With the trade to Seattle, Foxhoven was re-united with her former Portland Pilots teammates, Megan Rapinoe, Keelin Winters, and Elli Reed. Of the trade, Reign FC head coach Laura Harvey said, "Danielle is a fantastic addition to our squad. Her proven experience and ability will be a valuable asset in the future development of this team."

During the 2014 season, the Reign set a league record unbeaten streak of 16 games during the first part of the season. During the 16 game stretch, the team compiled a 13–0–3 record. The Reign finished first in the regular season clinching the NWSL Shield for the first time. After defeating the Washington Spirit 2–1 in the playoff semi-finals, the Reign were defeated 2–1 by FC Kansas City during the championship final. Foxhoven finished the 2014 season having started in 3 of the 12 games in which she played.

In January 2016, it was announced she would not return to Seattle Reign for the 2016 NWSL season.

== International career ==
Foxhoven represented the United States at various youth levels. She was a member of the under-17 women's national team and played in matches at the Nike Friendlies at The Home Depot Center in Carson, California. She was a member of the under-20 national team player pool and made several appearances with the under-23 national team, helping the side win the Four Nations Tournament in the United Kingdom.

== Coaching career ==
Foxhoven became the head coach for the women's soccer team at Purdue University Northwest in 2016.

== Honors ==
Portland Thorns FC

- NWSL Championship: 2013

Seattle Reign FC

- NWSL Shield: 2014, 2015
