= Keelin Winters =

Association football player (born 1988)

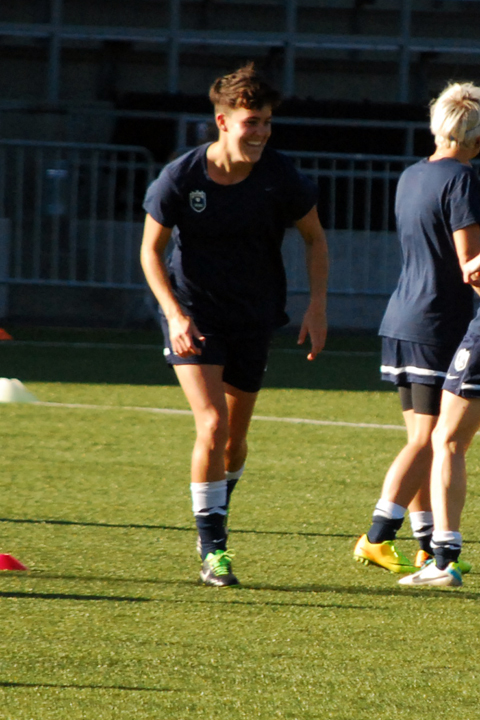
- Winters warming up for the Seattle Reign FC, 2013

Personal information
- Full name: Keelin Winters Pattillo
- Birth name: Keelin Mary Winters
- Date of birth: December 9, 1988 (age 37)
- Place of birth: Cleveland, Ohio, United States
- Height: 5 ft 8 in (1.73 m)
- Position: Defensive midfielder

Youth career
- 2001–2004: Mustang Blast
- 2004–2007: Real Colorado

College career
Years	Team	Apps	(Gls)
2007–2010	Portland Pilots		

Senior career*
Years	Team	Apps	(Gls)
2006–2008	Colorado Rush	16	(2)
2011	Boston Breakers	19	(4)
2012	Seattle Sounders	8	(1)
2012	1. FFC Turbine Potsdam	9	(2)
2013–2016	Seattle Reign FC	87	(6)
2014–2016	→ Western Sydney Wanderers (loan)	23	(7)

International career
2008	United States U20		
2010–2011	United States U23		
- * Club domestic league appearances and goals

Keelin Winters Pattillo (born Keelin Mary Winters; December 9, 1988) is an American retired soccer defensive midfielder who last played for the Seattle Reign FC of the National Women's Soccer League (NWSL), a team she captained to two consecutive NWSL Shield wins. She previously played for 1. FFC Turbine Potsdam in the Frauen-Bundesliga, Boston Breakers in Women's Professional Soccer, the Seattle Sounders of the American USL W-League, and Western Sydney Wanderers in the Australian W-League With Turbine Potsdam, she competed in three games of the 2012–13 UEFA Women's Champions League helping lift the team to the Round of 16. She played collegiate soccer for the University of Portland and was named West Coast Conference (WCC) Player of the Year in 2010.

Winters represented the United States on the U-20 and U-23 national teams. She was a member of the senior national team's player pool and was allocated by U.S. Soccer during the NWSL Player Allocation, but did not play during an official international match. In 2008, Winters captained the U-20 team to win gold at the 2008 FIFA U-20 Women's World Cup in Chile and scored the game-winning goal in the quarterfinal match against England.

== Early life ==
Winters was born in Cleveland, Ohio to parents Brian and Julie Winters. She has five siblings: Cara, Brendan, Kevin, Meghan and Ryan. Her father played nine years in the NBA for the Los Angeles Lakers and Milwaukee Bucks and later went on to coach in both the NBA and WNBA.

Winters played one year of high school soccer at Carondelet High School in Concord, California before moving to Colorado and joining Regis Jesuit High School where she was named the team's most valuable player (MVP) all four years. Winters earned first team all-state honors from 2006 to 2007 and all-state honorable mention honors in 2005. As a freshman, she helped Carondelet reach the 2003 North Coast Section finals. She played for a regional team in the Olympic Development Program (ODP) in 2005 as well as the Colorado State Team from 2004 to 2006.

=== University of Portland, 2007–2010 ===
Winters attended the University of Portland where she played for the Pilots from 2007 to 2010. In 2007, she played a total of 1,457 minutes. She was named Soccer Buzz First Team Freshman All-America, West Coast Conference (WCC) Freshman of the Year, Soccer Buzz All-West Region Second Team, All-WCC Second Team and Nike Portland Invitational Defensive MVP. She was twice named to the National Team of the Week.

In 2008, Winters missed five games, including all playoff matches, while training and playing at the FIFA U-20 Women's World Cup. She was named All-WCC honorable mention. In 2009, Winters started all 23 games for the Pilots, scored two goals and recorded two assists while co-captaining the team. She was named to the NSCAA Scholar All-West Region Second Team, West Coast Conference (WCC) All-Academic First Team, and All-WCC Second Team. In 2010, she was named WCC Player of the Year.

== Playing career ==
=== Club ===
==== Boston Breakers, 2011 ====
Winters was selected in the first round of the 2011 WPS Draft by the Boston Breakers. She scored her first goal in the 22nd minute of her professional debut during the Breakers' 4–1 win over the Atlanta Beat on April 9, 2011. During the 2011 WPS regular season, she recorded three goals and two assists while starting in 18 of the 19 games in which she played. Winters helped the Breakers to the playoffs where she scored the team's lone goal during the 3–1 loss to magicJack. Her season performance earned her a nomination for the WPS Rookie of the Year Award. The WPS suspended operations in early 2012.

==== Seattle Sounders Women, 2012 ====
On March 8, 2012, Winters signed a contract with Seattle Sounders Women, under head coach Michelle French, to play with national team members Alex Morgan, Hope Solo, Sydney Leroux, and Stephanie Cox. Of her signing, she said, "Once WPS was suspended, I was obviously really disappointed. I thought about going overseas, but transfer windows were closed and things became really complicated and frustrating...Alex Morgan asked if I was interested in playing with her on the Sounders. [Alex] knew I have been living in Seattle. Right after that, I went back and sent [Michelle] an email to find out more information about the Sounders Women. So that's how it all started for me." Winters played in eight matches for the Sounders Women, scored one goal and recorded one assist. The team finished second in the Western Conference with a 10–3–1 record. With the national teammates' presence on the team, the Sounders sold out nine of their ten home matches at the 4,500 capacity Starfire Stadium. Average attendance during the 2012 season for the Sounders Women was four times higher than the next closest team.

==== 1. FFC Turbine Potsdam, 2012–2013 ====
On May 10, 2012, it was announced that Winters would join German Bundesliga side 1. FFC Turbine Potsdam effective July 1, 2012. During the team's season opener against VfL Sindelfingen, she scored the first goal helping her team win 9–1. Her second goal on the season came during the 45th minute of Potsdam's 5–1 victory over SGS Essen on November 4, 2012. She made nine appearances for the team during the 2012–2013 season, including eight starts.

During the domestic cup, Frauen DFB Pokal, Winters scored three goals: two during Potsdam's 5–3 win over SGS Essen on October 7, 2012 and the game-winning goal against SC 07 Bad Neuenahr. During the 2012-13 UEFA Women's Champions League, she scored a goal in the team's 3–4 loss to Arsenal L.F.C. Winters made three Champions League appearances helping lift the club to the Round of 16.

==== Seattle Reign FC, 2013–2016 ====
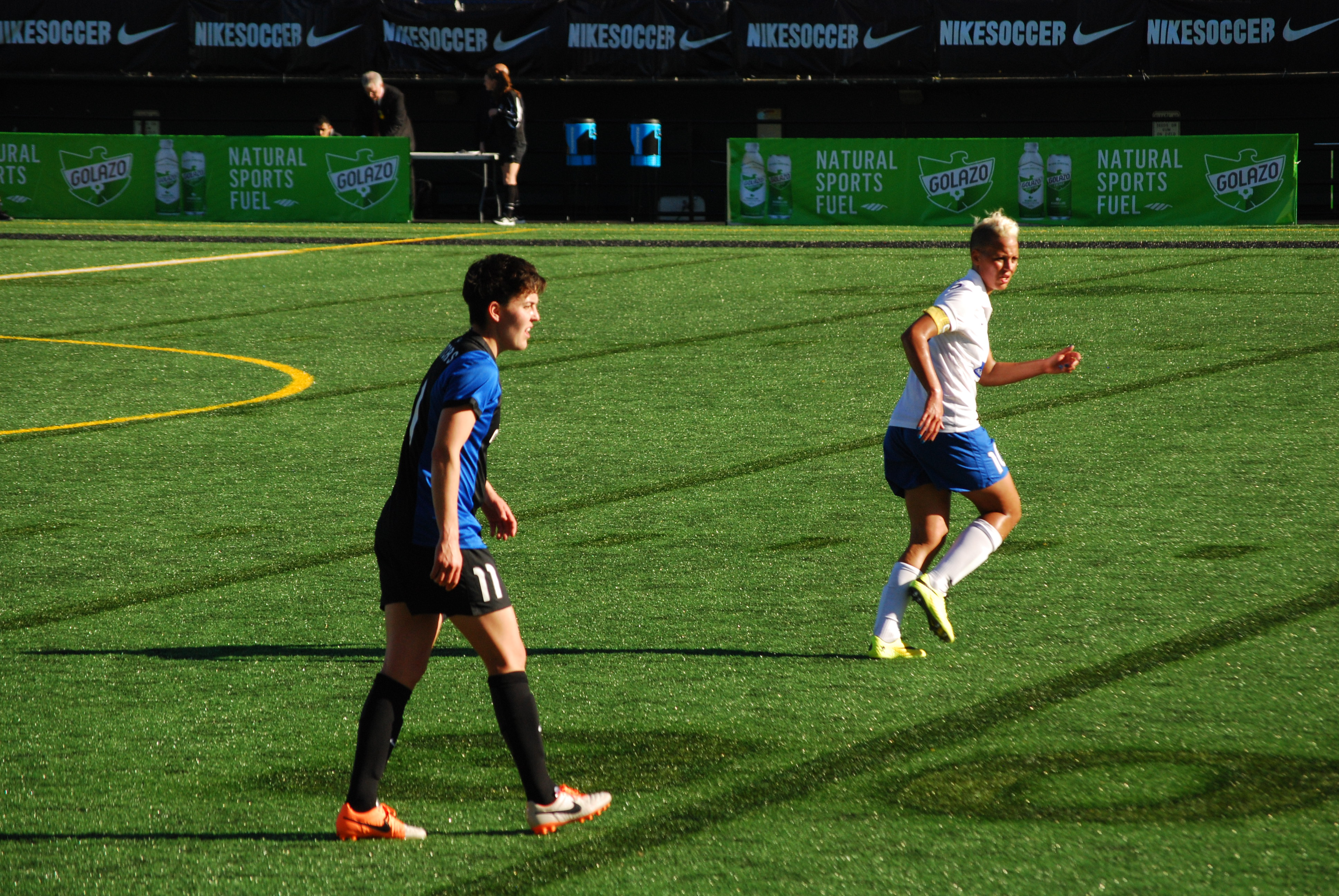
Winters (left) during a match against the Boston Breakers, April 2014

In 2013, after originally being allocated to the Chicago Red Stars as part of the NWSL Player Allocation, Winters was traded to Seattle Reign FC for the inaugural season of the National Women's Soccer League. She captained the team to a seventh place standing for the season. Winters played in 19 of the team's 22 games of the season, tallying a total of 1,710 minutes as a central midfielder for the squad. She scored one goal against the Western New York Flash on June 24, 2013 with an inside-the-eighteen yard box finish off an assist from Teresa Noyola. She also had one assist on the season. In October 2013, it was announced that she had signed a two-year contract with the Reign as a free agent (non-allocated player).

During the 2014 season, Winters captained the Reign, setting a league record unbeaten streak of 16 games during the first part of the season. During the 16 game stretch, the Reign compiled a 13-0-3 record. The team finished first in the regular season clinching the NWSL Shield for the first time. After defeating the Washington Spirit 2–1 in the playoff semi-finals, the Reign were defeated 2-1 by FC Kansas City during the championship final. Winters finished the 2014 season with three goals playing primarily as a holding midfielder. She started in 22 of the 23 matches in which she played.

After returning to the Reign for the 2015 season, Winters was credited along with Jess Fishlock as being the heart of the team and a major contributor to their winning record. The Reign finished the regular season in first place clinching the NWSL Shield for the second consecutive time. After advancing to the playoffs, Seattle faced fourth-place team Washington Spirit and won 3–0, advancing to the championship final. Seattle was ultimately defeated 1-0 by FC Kansas City during the championship final in Portland. Winters, along with teammates Stephanie Cox, Kendall Fletcher, and Megan Rapinoe, were named to the NWSL Second XI team.

"[Keelin's] given us absolutely everything on the field for the last four seasons. I call her the glue of this team. She's always tried to do the right thing and make sure everyone is included.."

— Laura Harvey

During the first few months of the 2016 season, a number of offensive players became unavailable due to injury including Manon Melis, Jess Fishlock and Megan Rapinoe. During the team's last home match of the season (and Winters' last home match with the Reign) on September 11, 2016, Winters scored a goal against Washington Spirit to lift the team to a 2–0 win and keep them in contention for a playoff berth. Seattle finished the regular season in fifth place with a 8–6–8 record, narrowly missing a playoff spot by two points. In September 2016, Winters announced her planned retirement following the end of the season.

==== Western Sydney Wanderers, 2014–2015 ====
In September 2014, Winters joined Western Sydney Wanderers on loan from Seattle. She made 11 appearances for the club and was the team's leading scorer with 5 goals. The Wanderers finished in last place during the regular season with a 2–8–2 record.

=== International ===
Winters was named captain of the United States U-20 women's national soccer team in 2008 and led the team to clinch the 2008 FIFA U-20 Women's World Cup in Chile. She scored the game-winning goal in the quarterfinal match against England.

Winters was part of the United States under-23 squad for the 2011 Four Nations Tournament. On May 9, 2012, she was called up for the United States match against China, but did not play.

== Personal life ==
Winters started a coaching business, Pro Skills Soccer and is an ambassador for Athlete Ally, a nonprofit organization that "provides public awareness campaigns, educational programming and tools and resources to foster inclusive sports communities." She is openly gay and married her longtime girlfriend Paige Pattillo on October 3, 2015. Following her retirement from professional soccer, Winters became a firefighter.

== Honors ==
Seattle Reign FC

- NWSL Shield: 2014, 2015

== See also ==
- List of University of Portland notable alumni
- List of Seattle Reign FC players
- List of Western Sydney Wanderers Women players
- List of foreign W-League (Australia) players
- List of LGBT sportspeople
