= Kiersten Dallstream =

American retired professional soccer player

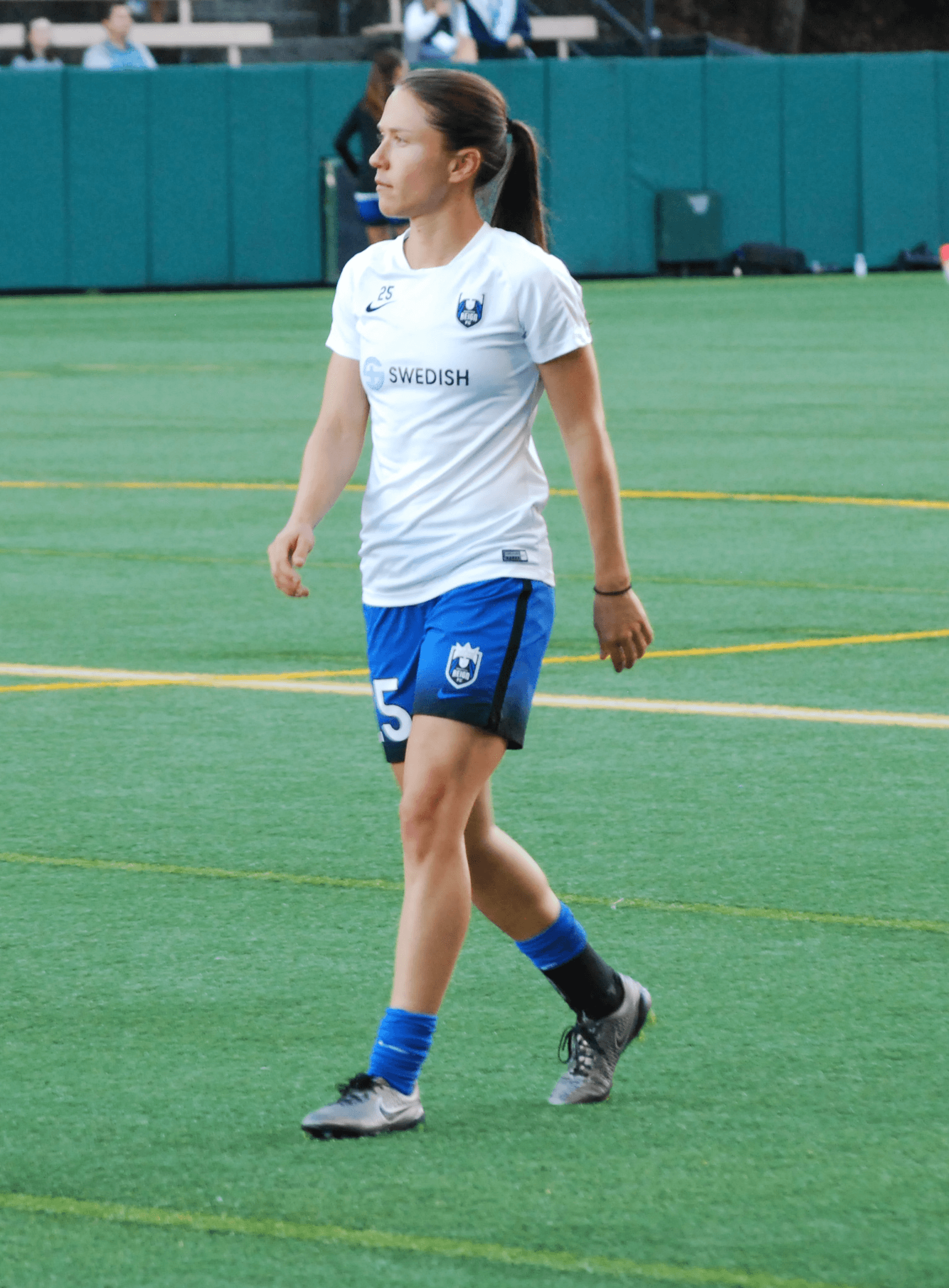
- Dallstream, 2016

Personal information
- Full name: Kiersten Roan Dallstream
- Date of birth: March 5, 1988 (age 38)
- Place of birth: Kirksville, Missouri, United States
- Height: 5 ft 7 in (1.70 m)
- Positions: Forward; defender

Youth career
- Sereno Golden Eagles

College career
Years	Team	Apps	(Gls)
2006–2009	Washington State Cougars		

Senior career*
Years	Team	Apps	(Gls)
2009	Arizona Rush	7	(5)
2010–2011	Sky Blue FC	12	(0)
2011	Boston Breakers	4	(0)
2013–2019	Reign FC	74	(1)

International career
2007–2008	United States U-20		
2009	United States U-23	1	(0)
- * Club domestic league appearances and goals

Kiersten Roan Dallstream (born March 5, 1988) is an American retired professional soccer player from Fountain Hills, Arizona. She played as a defender for Reign FC of the National Women's Soccer League (NWSL). She previously played for the Boston Breakers of Women's Professional Soccer (WPS) as a defender, as well as the United States U-20 women's national soccer team.

== Early life ==
Born in Kirksville, Missouri, Dallstream later attended West Chester East High School in West Chester, Pennsylvania, earning one letter in soccer. She was named All-ChesMont League and earned all-conference second team honors her freshman year. After moving to Fountain Hills, Arizona, she attended Fountain Hills High School for the remainder of her high school career. As a member of the '88 Sereno Golden Eagles White Club team, she earned three Arizona state titles. The team also won the 2003 Region IV championship and finished second nationally the same year. She was also a member of the Arizona Olympic Development Program (ODP) team.

=== Washington State University ===
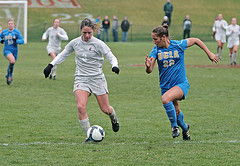
Dallstream playing for the Washington State Cougars

Dallstream attended Washington State University and finished her collegiate career third all-time in goals scored (30) for the Cougars women's soccer team as well as third in multiple-goal matches (6), points (76), game-winning goals (7), and assists (16). She ranked fourth in shots (198), sixth in matches played (75) and eighth in matches started (72).

During her freshman year, she was selected to participate in the United States U-20 women's national soccer team training camp and recorded a season-high six shots. As a sophomore in 2007, she started all 19 matches, scored 10 goals (then tied for eighth on the Cougar single-season list), and added four assists. Her three game-winning goals tied for seventh on WSU's single-season list. She was named All-West Region by Soccer Buzz as well as to the All-Pac-10 First Team and received an All-Pac-10 Academic honorable mention. During her junior year, Dallstream appeared in 16 matches, started 13 and led team with five assists. She was also a member of U.S. team that won gold medal at the 2008 FIFA U-20 Women's World Cup.

As a senior, Dallstream started all 22 matches and led the Cougars with 13 goals, seven assists (tying for team lead in assists), and 33 points. Her goals and assists tied for fourth on WSU single-season list and points were third. Her three game-winning goals tied for seventh on Cougar single-season list. Dallstream scored a point in 10-straight matches from September 3 – October 16, the second-longest streak in school history. She was a Pacific-10 Conference medal winner, an NSCAA Scholar Athlete Second Team University Division and First Team West Region. She was named Soccer America Second Team Pacific Region and All-Pac-10 Second Team.

== Playing career ==
=== Club ===
==== Sky Blue FC, 2010 ====
Dallstream was selected ninth overall in the 2010 WPS Draft by the Los Angeles Sol. When the Sol ceased operations, Dallstream was allocated to Sky Blue FC in the 2010 WPS Dispersal Draft. She made 12 appearances for the team during the 2010 season, playing a total of 567 minutes.

==== Boston Breakers, 2011 ====
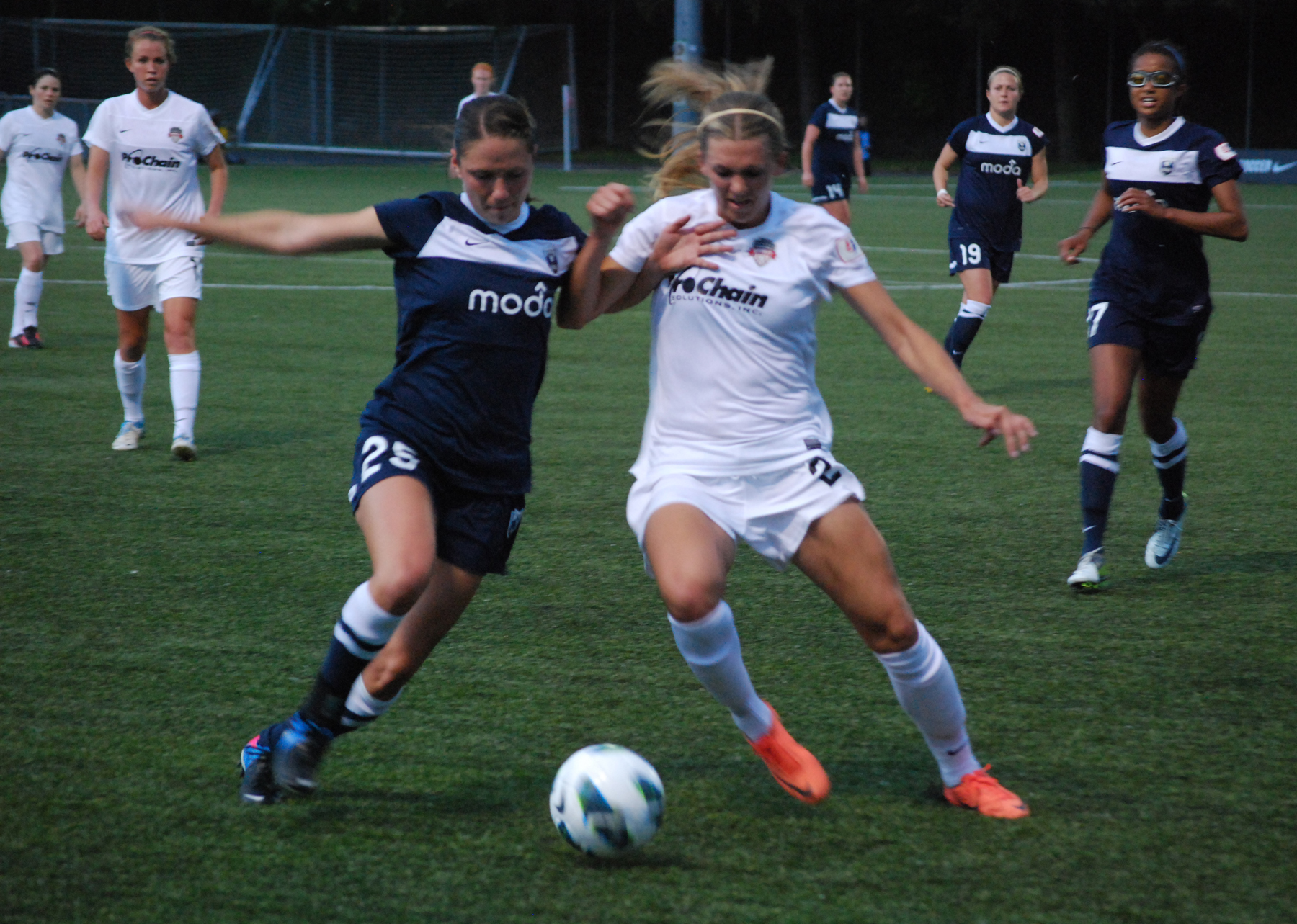
Dallstream battles for the ball against Stephanie Ochs of the Washington Spirit at Starfire Stadium on May 16, 2013

In April 2011, Dallstream was traded to the Boston Breakers. She made four appearances for the team, playing a total of 212 minutes.

==== Seattle Reign FC, 2013–2019 ====
Dallstream signed with the Seattle Reign FC for the inaugural season of the NWSL in 2013. She played in 20 of the team's 22 matches during the 2013 season, tallying a total of 1,296 minutes on the defensive line.

Dallstream returned to the Reign for the 2014 season. The team set a league record unbeaten streak of 16 games during the first part of the season. During the 16 game stretch, the Reign compiled a 13–0–3 record. The Reign finished first in the regular season clinching the NWSL Shield for the first time. After defeating the Washington Spirit 2–1 in the playoff semi-finals, the Reign were defeated 2–1 by FC Kansas City during the championship final. Dallstream finished the 2014 season with one assist. She started in 8 of the 15 games in which she played.

Dallstream retired in July 2019.

=== International ===
Dallstream was a member of the United States U-20 women's national soccer team that won the 2008 FIFA U-20 Women's World Cup in Chile, serving as a defender. She started in the first match against France. Dallstream later suffered a knee injury during the United States' third match versus China and was replaced at right back by Elli Reed for the rest of the tournament.

In July 2009, Dallstream received her first call-up to the United States U-23 women's national soccer team, and had one assist in her first and only game with the U-23s to date.

== Honors ==
Seattle Reign FC

- NWSL Shield: 2014, 2015

== See also ==
- List of Washington State University people
- List of Seattle Reign FC players
