= Carmelina Moscato =

Canadian soccer player and coach (born 1984)

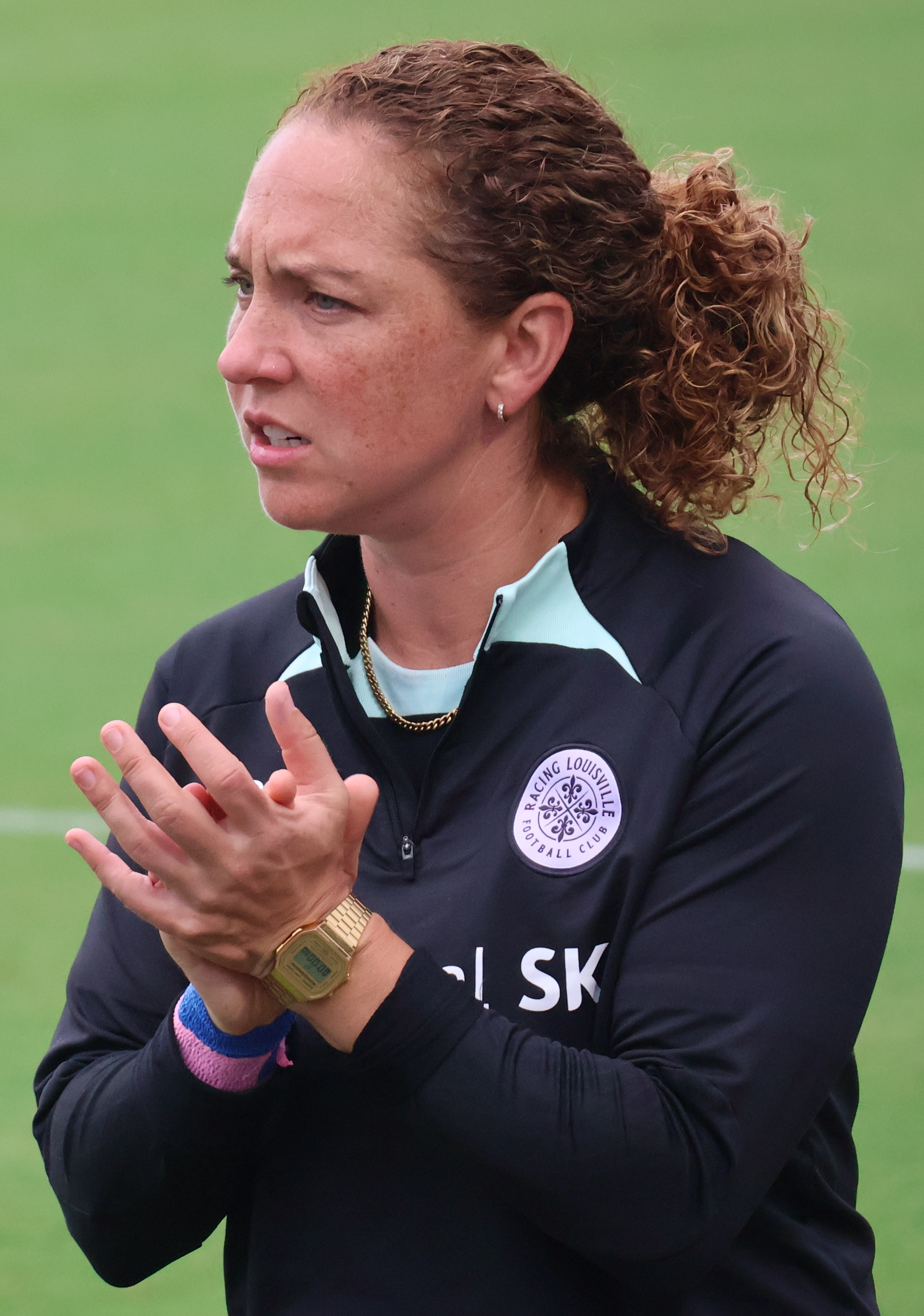
- Moscato with Racing Louisville in 2024

Personal information
- Full name: Carmelina Moscato
- Date of birth: May 2, 1984 (age 42)
- Place of birth: Mississauga, Ontario, Canada
- Height: 1.71 m (5 ft 7 1/2 in)
- Position: Defender

Team information
- Current team: Al Qadsiah FC (women)

Youth career
- Dixie SC
- Burlington Flames

College career
Years	Team	Apps	(Gls)
2002–2005	Penn State Nittany Lions		

Senior career*
Years	Team	Apps	(Gls)
2003–2004	Vancouver Whitecaps		
2005–2008	Ottawa Fury		
2009–2010	UPC Tavagnacco	15	(1)
2011	Piteå IF	10	(1)
2012	Dalsjöfors GoIF	1	(0)
2013	Chicago Red Stars	5	(0)
2013	Boston Breakers	5	(0)
2014–2015	Seattle Reign	1	(0)
2015–2016	Western Sydney Wanderers	9	(2)

International career^{‡}
2002	Canada U20	6	(0)
2002–2015	Canada	94	(2)

Managerial career
- 2016: Canada U15 (women)
- 2018–2020: Canada U20 (women)
- 2021–2022: FC Nordsjælland (women)
- 2022–2023: Tigres UANL Femenil
- 2024–2025: Racing Louisville FC (assistant)
- 2025–: Al Qadsiah FC (women)
Medal record
Women's football
Representing Canada
Olympic Games
Bronze medal – third place	2012 London	Team
CONCACAF W Championship
Winner	2010 Mexico
- * Club domestic league appearances and goals ‡ National team caps and goals as of 08:49, May 31, 2015 (UTC)

Carmelina Moscato (born May 2, 1984) is a Canadian soccer coach and former professional player who is currently head coach of the Saudi Women's Premier League club Al Qadsiah. She played as a defender for UPC Tavagnacco in the Serie A; Piteå IF and Dalsjöfors GoIF in the Damallsvenskan; the Chicago Red Stars, Boston Breakers and Seattle Reign FC in the National Women's Soccer League; and Western Sydney Wanderers in the Australian W-League. She made 94 appearances for the Canadian national team. She served as the commissioner of League1 Ontario Women's Division from 2019 to 2020. She was the director of women's football for the Bahamas Football Association in 2021 and served as assistant coach for Racing Louisville FC of the NWSL.

== Early life ==
Born in Mississauga, Ontario to Sicilian-born parents, Moscato began playing soccer at the age of four when she started playing for Dixie SC. She attended St. Hilary Elementary School. For high school, she attended St. Francis Xavier Secondary School in Mississauga where she was named Most Valuable Player. She also played for the club team Burlington Flames.

== College career ==
Moscato attended Pennsylvania State University from 2002 to 2005 and helped the Nittany Lions win four Big Ten regular season championships. During her time at Penn State, the team earned appearances in the College Cup semifinals in 2002 and 2005. Her 2002 season at Penn State yielded a Final Four appearance in the Division I NCAA Championship and were Big Ten Champions.

== Club career ==
=== From Canada to Italy and Sweden, 2005–2011 ===
Moscato joined the Vancouver Whitecaps in 2003 and played 256 minutes during her five appearances. In 2004, she helped the Whitecaps win their first W-League championship title. She scored three goals and three assists that season before joining Ottawa Fury in 2005. She sits 15th all-time amongst Whitecaps players after recording five goals and five assists in 14 appearances.

Moscato spent 2009 to 2010 with UPC Tavagnacco in the Serie A, the top division of soccer in Italy, before joining the national team camp to train heading into the 2011 FIFA Women's World Cup. She scored once in 15 league appearances playing as a defender. In July 2011, Moscato joined Canadian national teammates Melissa Tancredi and Stephanie Labbé to play for Piteå IF, a club in the Swedish Damallsvenskan. She started in all ten of her appearances with the club and scored one goal. She also made one appearance for Dalsjöfors GoIF in 2012.

=== NWSL, 2013–2015 ===
In 2013, she joined Chicago Red Stars for the inaugural season of the National Women's Soccer League (NWSL) as part of the NWSL Player Allocation. She made five appearances for the club. On June 29, 2013, it was announced that she had been traded to the Boston Breakers in exchange for her Canadian national teammate, Adriana Leon. She made five appearances for the Breakers during the remainder of the season. On September 10, 2013, she was traded to Seattle Reign FC in exchange for fellow Canadian national team player Kaylyn Kyle in preparation for the 2014 season.

== International career ==
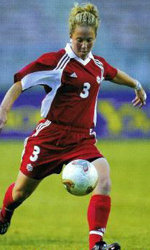

At just 16 years of age, Moscato made her Canadian U-20 national team debut on February 6, 2001, during a 3–2 defeat against Finland at the Adidas Cup in Houston, Texas. She represented Canada during the country's hosting of the 2002 FIFA U-19 Women's World Championship, playing all six matches and helping Canada reach the final before losing to the United States.

On April 3, 2002, Moscato earned her first cap with Canada's senior team, playing 19 minutes in a 0–0 draw against Australia. Moscato has played in major tournaments such as the 2002 CONCACAF Women's Gold Cup, the 2003 FIFA Women's World Cup, and the CONCACAF Olympic qualifying tournament in 2004. After taking a two-year hiatus from the game, she returned to the international scene in 2009, and played for Canada during the 2011 FIFA Women's World Cup in Germany and the 2012 Summer Olympics in London. Some of her most notable successes with the team include winning the 2010 CONCACAF Tournament in Cancun, the Cyprus Cup in March 2011, and earning a bronze medal at the 2012 Olympic Games.

== Coaching career ==
Moscato was an assistant coach at the University of Wisconsin and for the Louisville Cardinals.

In August 2016, Moscato coached Canada's women's under-15 squad to the second place in the 2016 CONCACAF Girls' U-15 Championship.

In 2017, she was the Talent Manager of the Canadian REX Development program before serving as an assistant coach with the Canadian women's U20 team from 2018 to 2020. In 2019, she served as the Technical Director for youth soccer team Kleinburg Nobleton SC.

Moscato became the head coach of the FC Nordsjælland women's team, a role she started in July 2021.

In June 2022, she was named Technical Director and head coach of Liga MX Femenil club Tigres UANL, becoming both the first woman and first foreigner to hold the role. Tigres won the 2022–23 Apertura Liguilla, qualifying Tigres for the Campeón de Campeones, and reached the Clausura Liguilla semi-finals under Moscato before being eliminated. Her Apertura championship was the first title win in Liga MX Femenil history by a foreign-born coach.

On June 2, 2023, Moscato announced her resignation from Tigres Femenil.

On February 19, 2024, Racing Louisville FC announced that Moscato had joined the club as an assistant coach.

On July 21, 2025, it was announced that Moscato had departed Racing Louisville to take up the role of head coach of Al Qadsiah in the Saudi Women's Premier League.

On August 10, 2026, Ottawa Rapid FC announced that Moscato would take over as head coach in the 2027 season.

== Administrative career ==
Moscato worked in Australia as Director and Coach of the Illawarra Stingrays Women's Senior Program in the NSW NPL Domestic League.

In September 2019, Moscato was named as the Commissioner of League1 Ontario Women's Division. In December 2020, she left the position.

In February 2021, she was named as the Director of Women's Football for the Bahamas Football Association, but departed later that year.

== Honours ==
=== Player ===
Canada

- CONCACAF Women's Championship: 2010
- Summer Olympics: bronze medal: 2012
- Canada Soccer Hall of Fame, class of 2023

=== Manager ===
Tigres UANL

- Liga MX Femenil: Apertura 2022

== See also ==
- List of 2012 Summer Olympics medal winners
- List of Olympic medalists in football
- List of Pennsylvania State University Olympians
