= Michelle Cruz =

Puerto Rican-American soccer defender

Personal information
- Full name: Michelle Olivia Cruz
- Date of birth: May 14, 1992 (age 34)
- Place of birth: Long Beach, California, United States
- Height: 5 ft 6 in (1.68 m)
- Position: Defender

College career
Years	Team	Apps	(Gls)
2010–2013	Portland Pilots	76	(9)

Senior career*
Years	Team	Apps	(Gls)
2014–2015	Apollon Limassol	5	(0)
2015–2016	Seattle Reign FC	3	(0)

International career
2008	Puerto Rico U17		
- United States U18
- * Club domestic league appearances and goals

Michelle Olivia Cruz (born May 14, 1992) is a Puerto Rican-American soccer defender who most recently played for Seattle Reign FC in the National Women's Soccer League. She previously played for Apollon Limassol in Cyprus.

== Early life ==
Born in Long Beach, California, Cruz attended Thousand Oaks High School where she was a four-year varsity player. Cruz helped lead the team to three consecutive league titles from 2007 to 2009. During her senior year in 2010, she was named Parade Magazine High School All-American, ESPN Rise Winter All-American and was ranked by TopDrawer Soccer as one of the top 100 high school players in the nation.

In 2004, she was on the Jetix Kids Cup championship team in Paris that was televised on ABC Family.

Cruz was a member of the Cal South Olympic Development Pool from 2006 to 2007 and won the Region IV Championship. In 2008, she was named to the NSCAA/Adidas Youth Girls All-Region IV team and was an Adidas Elite Soccer Program national selection.

== Playing career ==
=== Club ===
Played for Real So Cal (2004–07, 2009), winning multiple championships in 2006: Gothia Cup Youth World Cup, Surf Cup, and Manchester United Premier Cup ... also led Real So Cal to titles at the San Diego Surf Girls Cup (2007), San Diego Surf Cup XXIX (2009), and Fall Far West Regional League Championships (2009) ... played one year for Slammer FC (2008), winning the U17 Premier Championships.

=== Collegiate ===
==== University of Portland Pilots, 2010–2013 ====
Cruz attended the University of Portland from 2010 to 2013 where she was a four-year starting defender for the Portland Pilots. Following her freshman season in 2010, Cruz earned an All-West Coast Conference (WCC) Honorable Mention. Her performance during the 2011 season earned her Academic All-Region Second Team and WCC All Academic Honorable mention honors. In 2012, she ranked second on the team in assists (6) and points (16). Her five goals ranked third.

==== Apollon Limassol, 2014 ====
Cruz signed with Apollon Limossol in the Cypriot First Division for the 2014 season. She made five appearances for the club during the 2014–15 UEFA Women's Champions League before the team was eliminated in the Round of 32.

==== Seattle Reign FC, 2015–16 ====
In November 2014, it was announced that Cruz had signed with Seattle Reign FC for the 2015 season of the National Women's Soccer League. Of her signing, Reign FC head coach Laura Harvey said, "Michelle was someone we looked at towards the end of last season and felt could benefit our group. Having gained experience playing overseas, we are pleased she has decided to come to the NWSL." Cruz was waived by the team after the 2016 season.

=== International ===
Cruz has represented the United States on the under-15 and under-18 national teams. She played for the Puerto Rico under-17 national football team at the 2008 CONCACAF Women's U-20 Championship in Trinidad.

== See also ==
- List of University of Portland alumni
