= Caroline Means =

American soccer player (born 1993)

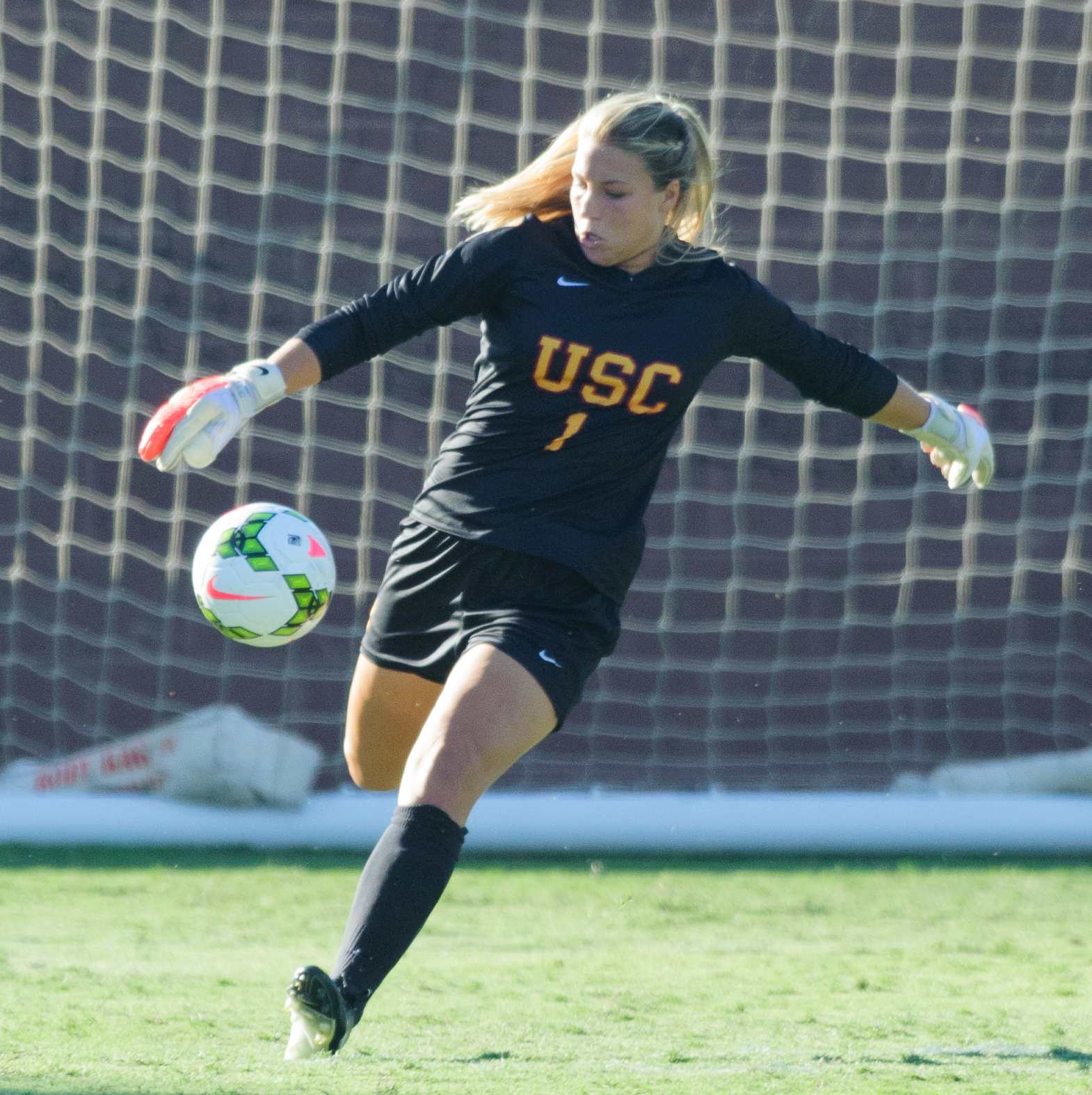

Personal information
- Full name: Caroline Elizabeth Means
- Birth name: Caroline Elizabeth Stanley
- Date of birth: March 16, 1993 (age 33)
- Place of birth: Kansas City, Missouri
- Height: 5 ft 10 in (1.78 m)
- Position: Goalkeeper

College career
Years	Team	Apps	(Gls)
2011	Missouri Tigers		
2012–2014	USC Trojans		

Senior career*
Years	Team	Apps	(Gls)
2015	Seattle Reign FC	1	(0)
2016	Sky Blue FC	11	(0)
2017	Orlando Pride	1	(0)

International career
2010	United States U-17		

Managerial career
- 2018: Tulsa Golden Hurricane (assistant)
- * Club domestic league appearances and goals

Caroline Elizabeth Means (née Stanley; born March 16, 1993) is an American retired soccer goalkeeper. Before announcing her retirement in 2018, Caroline played for Sky Blue FC, Seattle Reign FC and Orlando Pride in the National Women's Soccer League. She also represented the United States on the under-20, under-18, under-17, and under-15 national teams.

== Early life ==
Born to parents David and Kelly Stanley, in Oklahoma City, Caroline grew up in Missouri and attended Lee's Summit North High School in Lee's Summit, Missouri from 2007 to 2011 where she earned two consecutive Goalkeeper of the Year awards from the Missouri State High School Soccer Coaches Association. She also played volleyball, basketball and track for the school.

She played club soccer for KCFC Intensity, the Scream and her childhood and first club team, the Pink Panthers. She won five state titles. Appeared in five Regional playoffs. In 2011, she won the Elite Clubs National League (ECNL) with KCFC, making three saves during a shootout to win the championship.

=== USC Trojans, 2012–2014 ===
After playing one season for the University of Missouri, she transferred to the University of Southern California where she played for the Trojans from 2012 to 2014. During her first season with the Trojans, she started in 17 of the 18 games in which she played. She made 95 saves allowing 32 goals. During her junior year, she started all 20 games and made 78 saves allowing 25 goals. In her senior year, Stanley appeared and started in every game as a team captain and the only starting senior. She set records for most saves per match, and saved a penalty kick against Notre Dame to beat them on the road.

== Playing career ==
=== Club ===
Originally training with the Seattle Reign FC as an amateur player, Stanley signed with the team in July 2015. She made her first appearance for the club on August 1, 2015, during an away match against the Boston Breakers.

She signed with Sky Blue FC in March 2016.

After signing with the Orlando Pride following an injury to their backup goalkeeper Aubrey Bledsoe, she was substituted in for Ashlyn Harris early in the first half after Harris came down with a non-contact injury. This substitution happened one day after joining with her new club for the first time in Seattle, and she recorded several saves that contributed to a hard-fought road point against the Seattle Reign. On August 14, 2017, Orlando cut Means to make roster room for the return of Ashlyn Harris.

She officially announced her retirement from soccer on January 7, 2018, at age 24.

=== International ===
She has represented the United States on various youth national teams at the under-20, under-18, under-17, and under-15 levels. She played at the CONCACAF U-17 World Cup qualifiers in Florida and saved a penalty kick to beat Costa Rica.

== Post-Playing career ==
On February 27, 2018, Means announced that she had accepted the position as Goalkeeper Coach for the Tulsa Golden Hurricane women's soccer becoming the program's first full-time Goalkeeper Coach.

== Personal life ==
She married Baltimore Orioles pitcher John Means in November 2019. They welcomed their first child, a son, in 2020.

Means is an ambassador for The Young and Brave Foundation, a non-profit organization that supports children with cancer.
