= Haley Kopmeyer =

American soccer goalkeeper (born 1990)

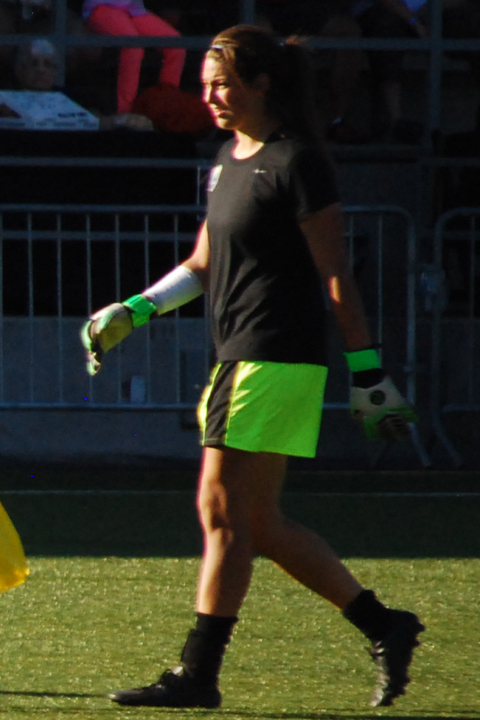
- Kopmeyer training with Seattle Reign FC in 2013

Personal information
- Full name: Haley Judith Kopmeyer
- Date of birth: June 28, 1990 (age 36)
- Place of birth: Troy, Michigan, United States
- Height: 5 ft 11 in (1.80 m)
- Position: Goalkeeper

College career
Years	Team	Apps	(Gls)
2008–2012	Michigan Wolverines	40	(0)

Senior career*
Years	Team	Apps	(Gls)
2013–2017	Seattle Reign FC	47	(0)
2014	→ Apollon Limassol (loan)	2	(0)
2015–2016	→ Brisbane Roar (loan)	12	(0)
2017–2018	→ Canberra United (loan)	12	(0)
2018–2019	Orlando Pride	13	(0)
- * Club domestic league appearances and goals as of February 4, 2020

Haley Judith Kopmeyer (born June 28, 1990) is an American soccer goalkeeper who last played for Orlando Pride of the NWSL. She previously played for Seattle Reign of the NWSL, Brisbane Roar and Canberra United of the Australian W-League and Apollon Limassol in Cyprus.

== Early life ==
Born to parents Joseph and Patricia Kopmeyer, Haley attended Lahser High School in 2008 and Seaholm High School from 2005 to 2007. In 2007, she was named to the all-state first team, the all-district first team, the all-conference first team, and all-region first team. She was a Parade All-American and NSCAA youth All-American the same year. In 2006, she was named to the all-state second team and all-district first team. Kopmeyer was also a two-time all-conference first team member.

=== University of Michigan, 2008–2012 ===
Kopmeyer attended the University of Michigan, majoring in political science and Spanish. During her freshman year with the Wolverines, Kopmeyer earned the University of Michigan Athletic Academic Achievement Award. After enduring a season-ending injury, she used a medical redshirt.

During her second year with the team, Kopmeyer led the Big Ten in saves (56), save percentage (.862) and saves-per-game (5.60) during conference play while topping the conference in overall save percentage (.848) and sharing the lead in saves (95). She played in 16 games, making 15 starts and set the school rookie record for shutouts with six. She was named Big Ten Freshman of the Week on October 26 after making 11 saves and allowing one goal in a pair of ties. She was awarded the University of Michigan Athletic Academic Achievement Award for the second year running and earned Academic All-Big Ten honors.

In 2011, Kopmeyer set the single season saves record for a Michigan women's soccer player.

In 2012, as a fifth year senior, Kopmeyer started all 24 matches, making 95 saves and was in net for 2,246 of 2,256 possible minutes. She earned 11 individual shutouts and two partial shutouts. Kopmeyer was named Big Ten Defensive Player of the Year and Big Ten Goalkeeper of the Year. Michigan reached the Sweet Sixteen and Kopmeyer was named to the NSCAA All-America Second Team. She was also named to the All-Big Ten (first team), NSCAA All-Great Lakes Region (first team) and Academic All-Big Ten. She was a two-time Big Ten Defensive Player of the Week.

== Playing career ==
=== Seattle Reign FC, 2013–2017 ===
On January 18, 2013, Kopmeyer was selected in the fourth round (31st overall pick) of the NWSL Draft by Seattle Reign FC. She made one appearance for the team during the 2013 season and was released from the team due to league roster constraints; however she was re-signed by the team for the 2014 season to back up Hope Solo. During the 2014 season, the Reign set a league record unbeaten streak of 16 games during the first part of the season. During the 16 game stretch, the Reign compiled a 13–0–3 record. The Reign finished first in the regular season clinching the NWSL Shield for the first time. After defeating the Washington Spirit 2–1 in the playoff semi-finals, the Reign were defeated 2–1 by FC Kansas City during the championship final. Kopmeyer finished the 2014 season with four caps for the Reign. She saved 17 of the 19 shots on goal for a 0.5 goals against average.

After Hope Solo took a leave of absence following the 2016 Olympics and her suspension from the US national team, Kopmeyer started the final nine games of the 2016 Reign season, finishing the season with 11 appearances as the team finished in 5th place, just missing out on the playoffs. Kopmeyer entered the 2017 season as the Reign's presumptive starting goalkeeper, and earned NWSL Player of the Week honors for an 8-save performance against Sky Blue FC in the first game of the 2017 season.

=== Canberra United, 2017–2018 ===
On September 15, 2017, Kopmeyer joined Canberra United on loan for the 2017–18 W-League season.

=== Orlando Pride, 2018–2019 ===
Kopmeyer was traded to the Orlando Pride in January 2018 as part of a multi-player trade ahead of the 2018 NWSL season. She was signed as a backup to national team keeper Ashlyn Harris. In February 2020, Kopmeyer was waived by Orlando.

=== Post-playing career ===
Following her retirement from professional soccer, Kopmeyer began working for Just Women's Sports.

== Honors ==
=== Individual ===
- NWSL Player of the Week: Week 1 (2017)

=== Club ===
Seattle Reign FC

- NWSL Shield (regular season winners): 2014, 2015
- NWSL Championship Runners-up: 2014, 2015
