= Kate Deines =

American soccer player (born 1989)

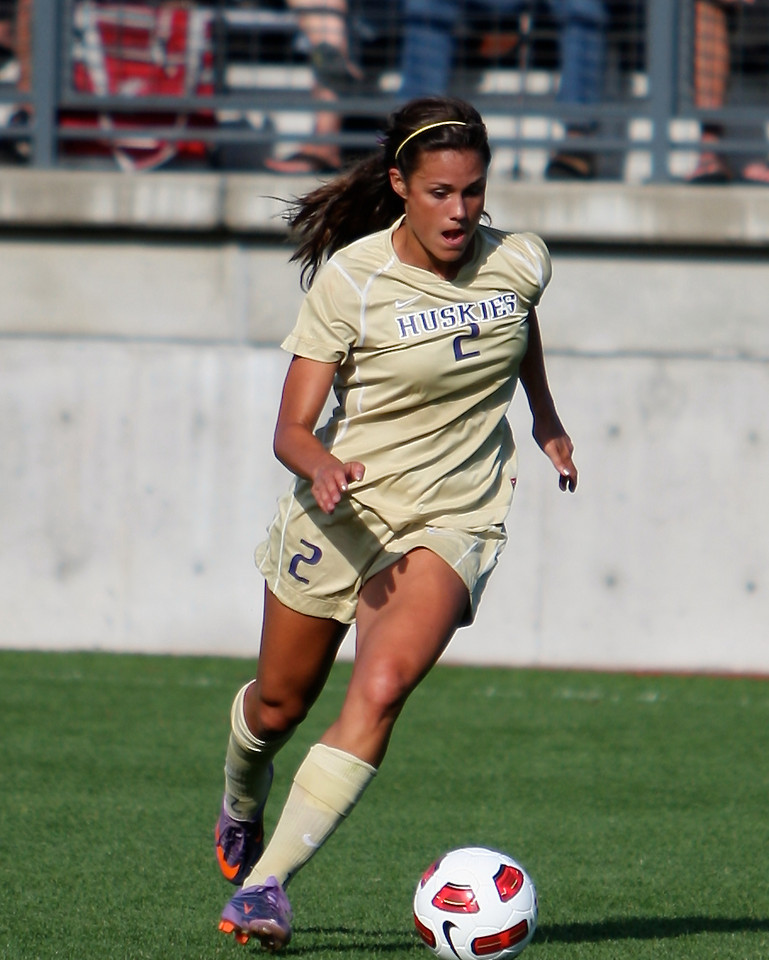
- Deines at a match against Seattle University in 2010

Personal information
- Full name: Kathleen Ann Deines
- Date of birth: September 17, 1989 (age 37)
- Place of birth: Portland, Oregon, United States
- Height: 5 ft 11 in (1.80 m)
- Positions: Midfielder; defender

College career
Years	Team	Apps	(Gls)
2008–2011	Washington Huskies		

Senior career*
Years	Team	Apps	(Gls)
2007–2009	Seattle Sounders Women	23	(0)
2012	Atlanta Beat	0	(0)
2012	Seattle Sounders Women	5	(0)
2012	Stjarnan	7	(2)
2013–2014	Seattle Reign FC	36	(0)
2014–2015	→ Turbine Potsdam (loan)	2	(0)
2015	FC Kansas City	0	(0)

International career^{‡}
2011	United States U23		
- * Club domestic league appearances and goals as of March 31, 2015 ‡ National team caps and goals as of January 19, 2012 (UTC)

Kathleen Ann Deines (born September 17, 1989) is an American soccer midfielder–defender. She most recently played for Turbine Potsdam in the German Bundesliga and Seattle Reign FC of the National Women's Soccer League. Deines was a fourth round pick (23rd overall) of the Atlanta Beat of Women's Professional Soccer in the 2012 WPS Draft of college seniors on January 13, 2012. The WPS Board of Governors voted to suspend the 2012 season on January 30 citing pending legal issues. Subsequently, she was free to sign with other teams and rejoined the Seattle Sounders Women, the organization she had previously played for from 2007 to 2009. After the formation of the National Women's Soccer League in late 2012, Deines played for the Seattle Reign during the league's first two seasons. She was traded to FC Kansas City in late 2014 but announced her retirement from professional soccer on March 31, 2015, before the 2015 season began.

== Early life ==
Deines was born in Portland, Oregon, on September 17, 1989, to Matt and Betsy Deines. As a freshman at Issaquah High School, Deines helped lead the soccer team to its first state championship final since 1988 and first title ever. Deines led the team to four consecutive conference championships from 2004 to 2007 and four state title games, winning three of them. Issaquah's lone runner-up finish was in 2005 when Deines was forced to miss the championship game to join the United States Youth Soccer Association Olympic Development Program in Boca Raton, Florida following the semifinal. Issaquah went on undefeated the next two years with Deines in the lineup.

Deines capped off her high school career by scoring the game-winning goal in the 71st minute of the 2007 state final, a 1–0 victory over Seattle Prep.

Deines finished with a total of 76 goals and was named to the all-state team four times and chosen as the state's Gatorade Player of the Year twice. During her senior year she was named to the Parade and NSCAA/adidas Girls High School All-America teams.

Deines has played soccer with the Seattle Sounders Women since joining the team in 2007 while still in high school.

=== University of Washington ===
Deines was a four-year starter for the Washington Huskies, starting a school-record 86 games and scoring 21 goals. She was named to the Pac-10 All-Freshman First Team and was a four-time All-Pac-10 selection and a two-time NSCAA Scholar All-American.

As a freshman at the University of Washington, Deines helped the Huskies return to the NCAA Tournament after a three-year absence. She played a leading role as team captain during her junior year. She converted two key penalty kicks, including the game winner, during an epic penalty shoot-out in a shocking upset of the No. 2 overall seed University of Portland in the second round of the NCAA Tournament. The Huskies would eventually go on to the Elite Eight where they were eliminated in an overtime loss at Boston College.

== Playing career ==
=== Club ===
==== Drafted to the Atlanta Beat, 2012 ====
Deines was selected as a fourth round pick (23rd overall) by the Atlanta Beat in the 2012 WPS Draft of college seniors on January 13, 2012; however, the league suspended operations before play began.

==== From Seattle to Iceland, 2012 ====
After the WPS folded in 2012, Deines signed with the Seattle Sounders Women. She made 12 appearances for the club, scoring one goal. Following the conclusion of the W-League season, Deines and her Sounders teammate and fellow University of Washington alum, Verónica Pérez, played for Stjarnan Women in Iceland's top division. The team won the Icelandic Women's Cup after a 1–0 win over Valur. Of her time in Iceland, Deines said, "Even though it was a spur of the moment decision to play overseas in Iceland, I believe my three month stint helped in my development as a player. Icelandic soccer was not nearly as technical or tactical as soccer in the United States but the extreme physicality of our practices and games challenged me to play with a whole new level of aggression. Playing professionally in Iceland also allowed me an opportunity to keep practicing and playing games on a daily basis which would not have been the case if I would have stayed in the United States."

==== Seattle Reign FC, 2013–14 ====
In February 2013, Deines signed with the Seattle Reign FC as a free agent for the inaugural season of the NWSL. Deines made 17 appearances for the club with 11 starts, tallying a total of 979 minutes.

==== Potsdam, 2014–15 ====
In September 2014, Deines signed a one-year contract with Germany's Turbine Potsdam in the Bundesliga.

== International ==
Deines was a member of the United States U-23 women's national soccer team and traveled to Sweden in June 2011.

== Personal life ==
Deines' younger brother Jay is an offensive lineman on the football team at Eastern Washington University.

== Honors ==
Seattle Reign FC

- NWSL Shield: 2014

== See also ==
- List of University of Washington people
- List of people from Portland, Oregon
