= Megan Brigman =

American former soccer defender

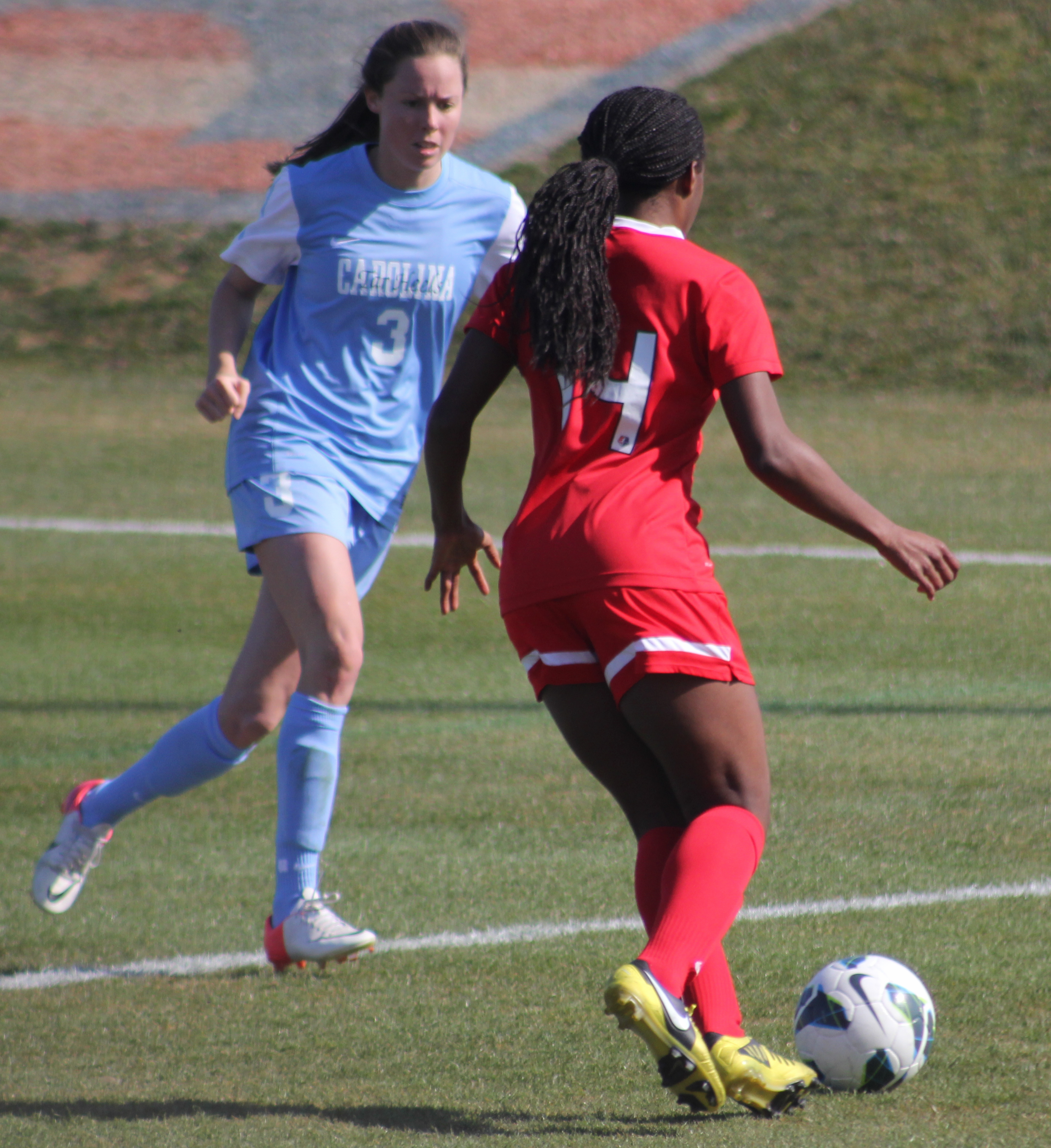
- Brigman on the left

Personal information
- Full name: Megan Lynn Brigman
- Date of birth: November 7, 1990 (age 35)
- Place of birth: Laurinburg, North Carolina United States
- Height: 5 ft 8 in (1.73 m)
- Position: Defender

College career
Years	Team	Apps	(Gls)
2009–2013	North Carolina Tar Heels	73	(6)

Senior career*
Years	Team	Apps	(Gls)
2014	Seattle Reign FC	2	(0)
- * Club domestic league appearances and goals

Megan Lynn Brigman (born November 7, 1990) is an American former soccer defender who played for Seattle Reign FC of the National Women's Soccer League.

== Early life ==
Born and raised in Laurinburg, North Carolina. Brigman attended Scotland High School where she was named female athlete of the year in her junior and senior years.

=== University of North Carolina ===
Brigman attended the University of North Carolina at Chapel Hill from 2009 to 2013, where she played soccer for the Tar Heels.

Brigman worked her way into the starting lineup after Rachel Given was injured in the 2010 season. Brigman stepped up to replace the valuable senior and remained in the backline for the remainder of the 2010 season, starting in 23 games. Brigman followed up by starting in 20 games in the 2011 season. The UNC coaches consider her one of the team's most improved players throughout her career.

== Playing career ==
On January 17, 2014, Brigman was selected in the second round (17th overall pick) of the 2014 NWSL College Draft by Seattle Reign FC. In March, the Reign signed her to the team. Head coach Laura Harvey said of her signing Laura Harvey said, "Megan was someone that we watched carefully last season and hoped would be available with our second pick. She has done very well in preseason training, and we believe she has the potential to develop into a successful professional player."

She first appeared for the club during the team's 2–0 win against Boston Breakers on June 19, 2014. The Reign finished first in the regular season, clinching the NWSL Shield for the first time. After defeating the Washington Spirit 2–1 in the playoff semi-finals, the Reign were defeated 2–1 by FC Kansas City during the championship final. Brigman finished the 2014 season with two caps for the Reign.

The Seattle Reign FC waived Megan Brigman after one season. General manager and head coach Laura Harvey said, "Despite the limited minutes she played last season, Megan was an important part of our squad. Given the increased depth of our squad this season, we felt her chances would be further limited, which led to the decision to waive Megan." Brigman only played 17 minutes in 2 games during the 2014 NWSL season.

== Post-soccer life ==
After one season with the Seattle Reign in 2014, Brigman retired from her soccer career. She began working in sports marketing. In October 2015, Megan began working as an intern for French West Vaughan.

== Honors ==
Seattle Reign FC

- NWSL Shield: 2014

== See also ==
- List of University of North Carolina at Chapel Hill alumni
