= Stephanie Cox =

American soccer coach and player (born 1986)

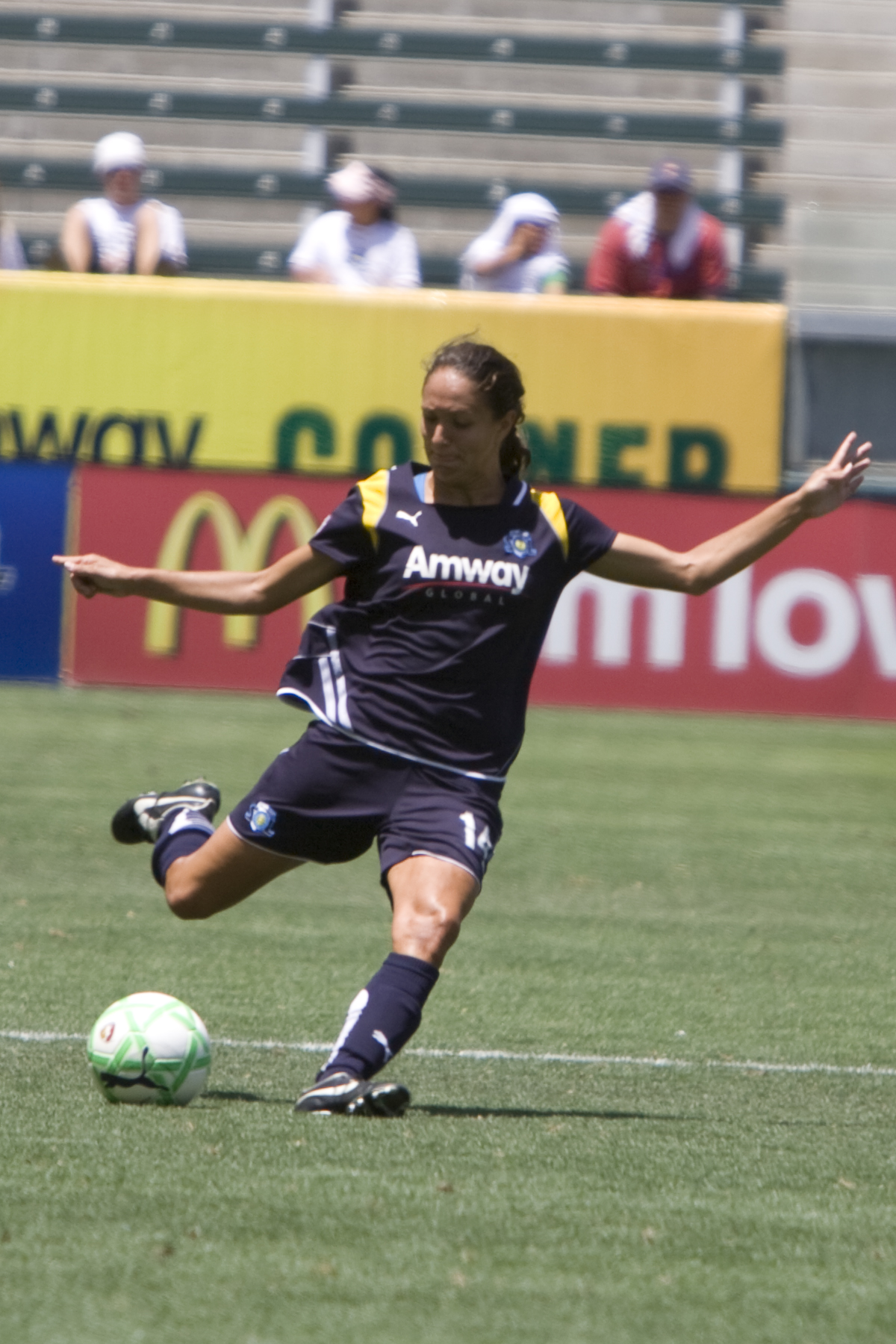

Personal information
- Full name: Stephanie Renee Cox
- Birth name: Stephanie Renee Lopez
- Date of birth: April 3, 1986 (age 40)
- Place of birth: Los Gatos, California, U.S.
- Height: 5 ft 6 in (1.68 m)
- Position: Defender

Team information
- Current team: Puget Sound Loggers (interim head coach)

Youth career
- 2002: Elk Grove Pride

College career
| Years | Team | Apps | (Gls) |
| 2003–2007 | Portland Pilots | 74 | (3) |

Senior career*
| Years | Team | Apps | (Gls) |
| 2009 | Los Angeles Sol | 19 | (0) |
| 2010–2011 | Boston Breakers | 34 | (1) |
| 2012 | Seattle Sounders Women | 12 | (1) |
| 2013–2015 | Seattle Reign FC | 45 | (0) |
| 2019–2021 | OL Reign | 8 | (0) |

International career^{‡}
| 2000 | United States U-14 | | |
| 2002 | United States U-17 | | |
| 2003–2006 | United States U-19 | | |
| 2005–2007 | United States U-21 | | |
| 2005–2014 | United States | 89 | (0) |

Managerial career
- 2012: Puget Sound Loggers (assistant)
- 2015–2019: Gig Harbor HS
- 2017: Seattle Reign FC (assistant)
- 2019: Reign FC (assistant)
- 2022–: Puget Sound Loggers (head)
Medal record
Women's football
Representing the United States
Olympic Games
| Gold medal – first place | 2008 Beijing | Team |
FIFA Women's World Cup
| Bronze medal – third place | 2007 China | Team |
| Silver medal – second place | 2011 Germany | Team |
- * Club domestic league appearances and goals as of June 1, 2019 ‡ National team caps and goals as of September 14, 2014

Stephanie Renee Cox (née Lopez; born April 3, 1986) is an American soccer coach and former professional player who played as a defender. She is currently the head coach of the Puget Sound Loggers women's soccer team.

As a player, Cox played as a defender for the United States women's national soccer team and won an Olympic gold medal at the 2008 Summer Olympics.

== Early life ==
Born in Los Gatos, California, Cox grew up in Elk Grove, California and attended Elk Grove High School where she helped lead her soccer team to two league championships. She was named to the all-section team as a junior and senior, won the youth All-American award from NSCAA and was named a Parade Magazine All-American. On top of her numerous soccer achievements, she also lettered in basketball for three years and graduated with a 4.17 GPA.

=== University of Portland ===
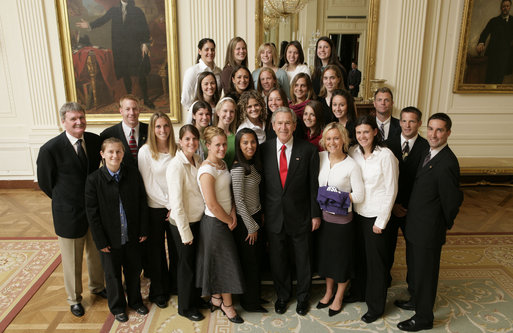
Cox with the Portland women's soccer team at the White House, April 6, 2006

Cox attended the University of Portland, where she started 23 matches her freshman year. In 2005, after returning to the Pilots following a redshirt season to play for the US, Stephanie helped lead her team to an undefeated record of 23–0–2 and an NCAA Championship and was named to the NCAA All-Tournament Team. The following season, she started in 13 games and scored her first collegiate goal.

In 2007, after she returned from the World Cup, Lopez led the Jollons to 11 straight wins and 10 shutouts and helped her team advance to the NCAA quarterfinals. After the World Cup, she had a chance to forgo her remaining collegiate eligibility and become a salaried player with the senior national team, but loyalty to her team and prior commitments led her back to Portland where she graduated with a 3.7 GPA and a psychology degree and a Spanish minor in December 2007. She was honored as the Lowe's Senior CLASS Award winner, recognizing her as the nation's top senior in women's soccer. 2007 also marked the first time the award was presented to a female soccer player. Cox was also chosen as Oregon's Female Amateur Athlete of the Year for 2007.

== Club career ==
=== Los Angeles Sol ===
In 2009, Cox signed with the Los Angeles Sol for the inaugural season of the WPS. She made 20 starts in 20 games for a total of 1800 minutes. The team came in first in regular season standings, but lost the championship 1–0 to Sky Blue FC.

=== Boston Breakers ===
After the Sol disbanded after the 2009 WPS season due to financial difficulties, Cox was acquired by the Boston Breakers during the 2010 WPS Dispersal Draft. Cox helped lead the team to second place in the regular season standings. She started all 24 games and scored one goal during the 2010 WPS season.

Cox returned to the Breakers for the 2011 WPS season. She started in all 11 games in which she played.

=== Seattle Sounders Women ===
After the WPS suspended operations in early 2012, Cox signed with the Seattle Sounders Women, joining fellow women's national team members, Hope Solo, Megan Rapinoe, Sydney Leroux, and Alex Morgan. She made 12 appearances for the club tallying a total of four points on two assists and one goal.

=== Seattle Reign FC ===
On June 19, 2013, Seattle Reign FC announced that they had signed Cox for the remainder of inaugural season of the National Women's Soccer League. Cox was returning to the pitch after taking time away after the birth of her first child. She made four appearances for the club, tallying 326 minutes on the defensive line.

Cox returned to the Reign for the 2014 season and helped the team set a league record unbeaten streak of 16 games during the first part of the season. During the 16 game stretch, the Reign compiled a 13–0–3 record. The Reign finished first in the regular season clinching the NWSL Shield for the first time. After defeating the Washington Spirit 2–1 in the playoff semi-finals, the Reign were defeated 2–1 by FC Kansas City during the championship final. Following the regular season, Cox along with goalkeeper Hope Solo and fellow defender Lauren Barnes were named to the Second XI team. Cox finished the 2014 season with one assist having started in 20 of the 21 games in which she played.

Following the 2015 season, Cox announced her retirement from professional soccer.

=== Return from retirement ===
More than three years after her retirement from professional soccer, Cox decided to resume playing and signed as a National Team replacement player for former club Reign FC on May 31, 2019. After four appearances, she was promoted to the club's senior roster on July 16, 2019.

Following the 2021 season, Cox announced her second retirement from professional soccer.

== International career ==
Cox became involved in the US National Team Youth program in 2000. At the U-20 level, she played at the 2004 FIFA U-19 Women's World Championship in Thailand; two years later, she captained the US team in the 2006 FIFA U-20 Women's World Championship in Russia. She made her first national team career start against France at the Algarve Cup in 2006. Her play helped the Women's National Team win a gold medal at the 2008 Beijing Olympic Games.

== Coaching career ==
Cox began coaching while still an active player. She first joined Puget Sound Loggers as an assistant coach in 2012. Cox was the head coach of the girls' soccer team at Gig Harbor High School from 2015 to 2019, and she led them to an undefeated season and a state championship in 2018.

After her retirement from professional soccer, Cox was an assistant coach for Seattle Reign FC in 2017. She returned as assistant coach after the club's relocation to Tacoma, Washington, in 2019, before deciding to resume her playing career midway through the season.

In June 2022, Cox was named the interim head coach of the Puget Sound Loggers women's soccer team. Stephanie Cox was named Puget Sound's head coach in December 2022 after serving as the interim head coach for the 2022 season. Cox led the 2022 Loggers to a 16-4-1 overall record and an at-large bid for the NCAA D-III Championship. She also coaches club soccer for Harbor Premier.

== Personal life ==
Cox is a Christian. Cox has talked about her faith saying, "My faith in Christ has made my role as an athlete so much more meaningful. It is more than wins and losses, X's and O's; it is about loving others and showing them Christ." Cox is of Mexican descent.

Cox has assisted her parents, Rob and Cindy Lopez, in leading a group of teens to Egypt to paint an orphanage, traveled to the Bahamas to clear land for construction of a learning center, traveled to Mexico to serve meals to American missionaries, and was part of a team that created a Hurricane Katrina fundraiser in 2005. She recently became a spokesperson for Casey Family Services, the country's largest foster care organization.

Stephanie lives in Gig Harbor, Washington with her husband, former University of Portland baseball player Brian Cox, and their daughter.

== Honors ==
Seattle Reign FC

- NWSL Shield: 2014, 2015

== See also ==
- List of Olympic medalists in football
- List of University of Portland alumni
