= Elli Burris =

American soccer player

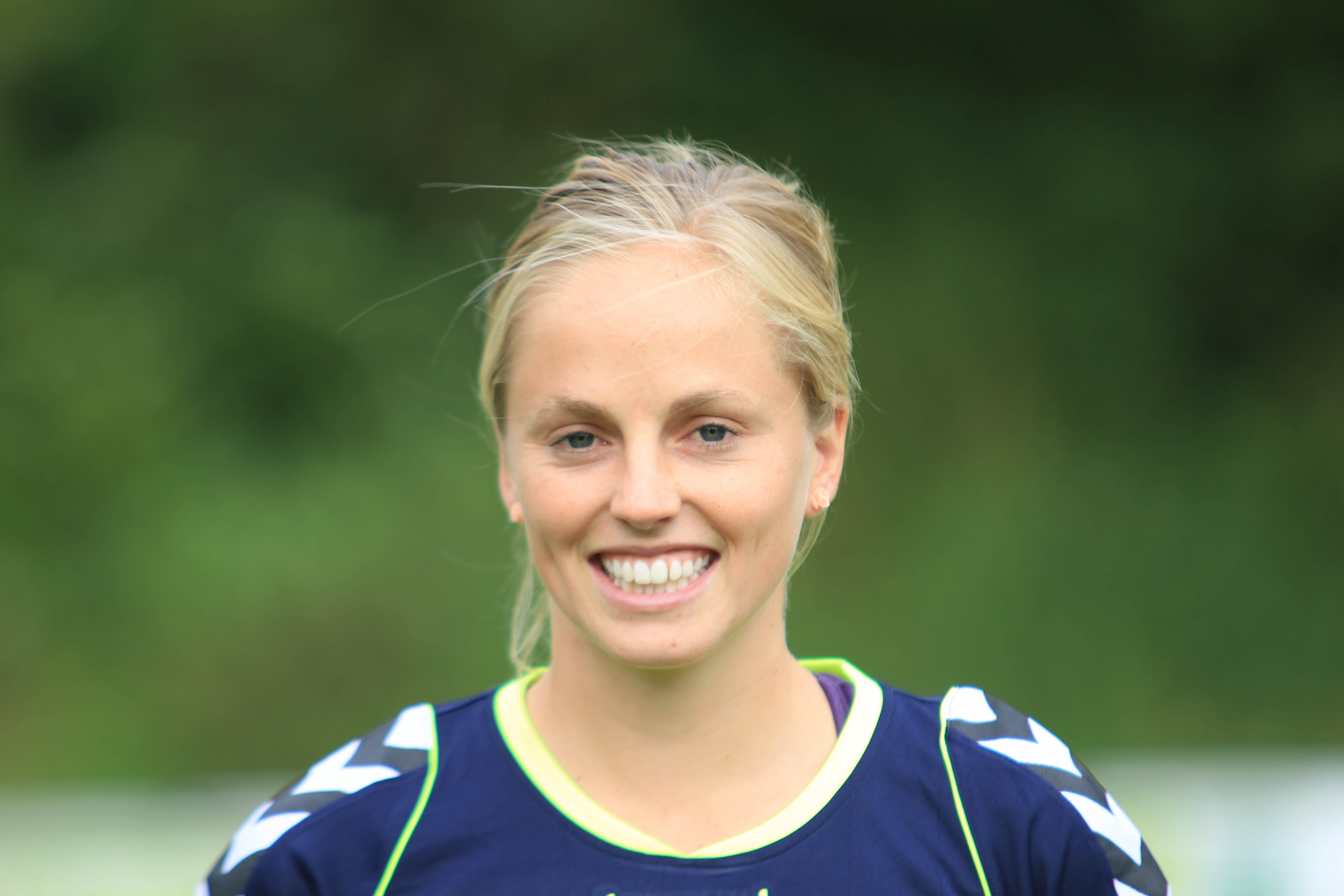
- Burris playing for FCR 2001 Duisburg in 2012

Personal information
- Full name: Elli Kayla Burris
- Birth name: Elli Kayla Reed
- Date of birth: August 10, 1989 (age 37)
- Place of birth: Salt Lake City, Utah, U.S.
- Height: 5 ft 5 in (1.65 m)
- Positions: Midfielder; defender

Youth career
- 2004–2007: Utah Avalanche

College career
Years	Team	Apps	(Gls)
2007–2010	Portland Pilots		

Senior career*
Years	Team	Apps	(Gls)
2011–2012	Boston Breakers	21	(1)
2012–2013	FCR 2001 Duisburg	11	(0)
2013–2017	Seattle Reign FC	77	(0)
2013	→ Kristianstads DFF (loan)	8	(0)
2014	→ Melbourne Victory (loan)	11	(0)
2022	OL Reign	0	(0)

International career
2006	United States U-17	4	(1)
2008	United States U-20	13	(0)
2009–2012	United States U-23	8	(0)
- * Club domestic league appearances and goals

Elli Kayla Burris (née Reed; born August 10, 1989) is an American professional soccer player who last played as a defender for OL Reign of the NWSL. She previously played for FCR 2001 Duisburg in the Frauen-Bundesliga, Melbourne Victory in the Australian W-League as well as the Boston Breakers in the WPS and the WPSL Elite.

== Early life ==
Burris attended Park City High School for all four years of her high school career. She helped the Park City Miners women's soccer team win the 3A State Championship in 2004 and 2005. She also on competed on her high school's state championship team in track and field and cross country.

=== University of Portland ===
In her first two years with the University of Portland, Burris was named a Soccer Buzz Freshman All-American (Fourth Team), Soccer Buzz All-West Region Freshman Team, All-WCC Freshman Team, Soccer America National Team of the Week honors, Soccer Buzz All-West Region Third Team, WCC All-Academic Team, All-WCC Second Team and the 2008 Portland Nike Invitational Most Outstanding Offensive Player after recording a hat trick against Northern Arizona University and adding another goal against Colgate University.

== Club career ==
=== Boston Breakers, 2011 ===
Burris was drafted eighth overall in the 2011 WPS Draft by the Western New York Flash, but was traded to the Boston Breakers. She made 10 appearances for the team for a total of 575 minutes. After the WPS folded in early 2012, Burris joined the Breakers in the WPSL Elite, the top division of women's soccer in the United States at the time. She helped the Breakers win the regular season title with the game-winning goal over Western New York Flash. Of the goal, she said, "I saw Shep (Katie Schoepfer) play the ball short to Bianca (D'Agostino), and Bianca played it back to Shep, and she hit in a really nice ball. The keeper got a hand on it, but then it hit another girl's chest, and it was bobbling around, and I just hit it in. It feels great, especially since it helped get us the (regular season) title. I'm very excited. There's a good energy amongst the team, and we're feeling good going into playoffs."

=== FCR 2001 Duisburg, 2012 ===
Burris joined FCR 2001 Duisburg in July 2012. She made 11 appearances for the team, starting 10 games, for a total of 754 minutes.

=== Seattle Reign FC, 2013–2017 ===
On February 8, 2013, it was announced that Burris had signed with the Seattle Reign FC for the inaugural season of the NWSL. After suffering an ankle injury early in the season, Burris made seventeen appearances for the club, tallying a total of 1,503 minutes. On July 11, 2013, she served her first assist of the season to Christine Nairn helping the Reign defeat the Western New York Flash 3–2 at Starfire Stadium in Tukwila, Washington. On July 14, 2013, during the Reign's first sold-out home match, Reed served her second assist on the season to Nairn, helping the Reign defeat the Washington Spirit 2–1.

Burris returned to the Reign for the 2014 season. The team set a league record unbeaten streak of 16 games during the first part of the season. During the 16 game stretch, the Reign compiled a 13–0–3 record. The Reign finished first in the regular season clinching the NWSL Shield for the first time. After defeating the Washington Spirit 2–1 in the playoff semi-finals, the Reign were defeated 2–1 by FC Kansas City during the championship final. Burris finished the 2014 season having started in 19 of the 22 games in which she played.

Burris announced her retirement on September 22, 2017.

==== Kristianstads DFF, 2013 ====
Following the conclusion of the 2013 NWSL season, Burris was signed on loan to Swedish side, Kristianstads DFF. She made her debut for the team in a match against Linköping on September 3.

==== Melbourne Victory, 2014 ====
Burris signed for Australian club Melbourne Victory on loan and will join them after the conclusion of the 2014 NWSL season.

=== OL Reign, 2022 ===
In July 2022, Burris came out of retirement and signed as a National Team Replacement player for former club OL Reign.

== International career ==
Burris was a member of the United States U-20 women's national soccer team, which won the 2008 FIFA U-20 Women's World Cup in Chile. She played in six matches, and started in the final match where the United States defeated North Korea, 2–1. She was also a member of the United States U-17 women's national soccer team in 2006.

== Personal life ==
Burris earned a bachelor's degree in sociology and a minor in psychology from the University of Portland in 2011. She later earned a Master of Business Administration from the school in 2020.

== Honors ==
Seattle Reign FC

- NWSL Shield: 2014, 2015

== See also ==
- List of University of Portland notable alumni
- List of foreign Damallsvenskan players
- 2008 FIFA U-20 Women's World Cup squads
