= 2018 Seattle Reign FC season =

Seattle Reign FC
2018 season
- Owners: Bill and Teresa Predmore
- President: Bill Predmore
- Head coach: Vlatko Andonovski
- Stadium: UW Medicine Pitch at Memorial Stadium
- NWSL: 3rd
- Playoffs: Semi-final
- Top goalscorer: League: Jodie Taylor (9); All: Jodie Taylor (9)
- Highest home attendance: 5,251
- Lowest home attendance: 3,172
- Average home league attendance: 3,824
Home colors	Away colors

The 2018 Seattle Reign FC season was the club's sixth season of play and their sixth season in the National Women's Soccer League, the top division of women's soccer in the United States. After finishing fifth in the league for two consecutive seasons, the Reign finished third to return to the playoffs, where they lost to Portland Thorns FC in the semi-final.

Vlatko Andonovski replaced Laura Harvey as head coach on November 7, 2017. Andonovski was previously the head coach of FC Kansas City.

This was ultimately the club's last season of their first stint in Seattle, as well as its last as Seattle Reign FC. During the 2018–19 offseason, the club's principal owners, Bill and Teresa Predmore, announced that the team would move to Tacoma, Washington for 2019 and beyond, rebranding as Reign FC. In addition, the team gained two new minority investors—the ownership group of the Tacoma Rainiers, a Triple-A Minor League Baseball team in the Pacific Coast League, and Adrian Hanauer, the principal owner of the region's Major League Soccer team, Seattle Sounders FC. Reign FC played in the Rainiers' home of Cheney Stadium. A new soccer stadium in Tacoma, already planned for the Sounders' USL Championship affiliate Tacoma Defiance, was expected to be built by 2021, with Reign FC to move in upon its completion. However, in December 2021, it was announced that the club would return to Seattle.

== Club ==
=== Coaching staff ===
Position	Staff
Head Coach	(North Macedonia) Vlatko Andonovski
Assistant Coach	(England) Sam Laity
Assistant Coach	(Serbia) Milan Ivanovic
Director of High Performance	(Australia) Nick Leman

Last updated: February 19, 2018
Source: https://medium.com/@ReignFC/seattle-reign-fc-announce-preseason-roster-6ea67a686698

=== Roster ===
As of July 16, 2018.

Note: Flags indicate national team as defined under FIFA eligibility rules; some limited exceptions apply. Players may hold more than one non-FIFA nationality.

No.	Pos.	Nation	Player
1	GK	AUS	Lydia Williams
2	DF	USA	Yael Averbuch
3	DF	USA	Lauren Barnes
4	DF	USA	Megan Oyster
5	FW	USA	Kiersten Dallstream
6	MF	USA	Allie Long
7	DF	AUS	Steph Catley (on loan from Melbourne City)
8	DF	DEN	Theresa Nielsen
9	FW	JPN	Nahomi Kawasumi
10	MF	WAL	Jess Fishlock
11	MF	GHA	Elizabeth Addo
12	MF	USA	Morgan Andrews

No.	Pos.	Nation	Player
13	FW	CAN	Adriana Leon
14	FW	ENG	Jodie Taylor
15	FW	USA	Megan Rapinoe (captain)
16	FW	USA	Jaycie Johnson
17	FW	USA	Beverly Yanez
18	GK	USA	Michelle Betos
19	DF	USA	Kristen McNabb
20	MF	JPN	Rumi Utsugi
21	DF	USA	Christen Westphal
22	FW	USA	Jasmyne Spencer
24	DF	USA	Alyssa Kleiner

== Competitions ==
Win Tie Loss

All times are in PT unless otherwise noted.

=== Preseason ===
March 8, 2018	Washington Huskies	1–3	Seattle Reign FC	Seattle, Washington
18:30	Smith 65'	Report	Dallstream 21'; Andrews 64'; Verdoia 69'	Stadium: Husky Soccer Stadium

March 13, 2018	UCLA Bruins	0–4	Seattle Reign FC	Norco, California
20:00		Report	Taylor 52'; Rapinoe 56'; Yanez 61', 73'	Stadium: SilverLakes Complex

=== Regular season ===
March 24, 2018 1	Seattle Reign FC	2–1	Washington Spirit	Seattle, Washington
19:00	Rapinoe 7' (yellow card) 64'; Taylor 35'; Andrews (yellow card) 90'	Box; Report	Lohman 68'	Stadium: Memorial Stadium; Attendance: 3,561; Referee: Ekaterina Koroleva

April 15, 2018 2	Sky Blue FC	0–1	Seattle Reign FC	Piscataway, New Jersey
20:00	McCaskill (yellow card) 50'	Box; Report	Rapinoe 6' (pen.); Dallstream (yellow card) 82'	Stadium: Yurcak Field; Attendance: 1,913; Referee: Marco Vega

April 18, 2018 3	North Carolina Courage	1–0	Seattle Reign FC	Cary, North Carolina
16:00	Hamilton (yellow card) 14'; McDonald 70'	Box; Report		Stadium: WakeMed Soccer Park; Attendance: 3,011; Referee: Kevin Broadley

April 28, 2018 4	Orlando Pride	1–1	Seattle Reign FC	Orlando, Florida
16:30	Marta 61'	Box; Report	Long 33'; Betos (yellow card) 89'	Stadium: Orlando City Stadium; Attendance: 5,058; Referee: Javier Santos

May 5, 2018 5	Portland Thorns FC	2–3	Seattle Reign FC	Portland, Oregon
12:30	Sonnett 61'; Horan 70'	Box; Report	Long (yellow card) 31'; Yanez 36'; Taylor 64' (pen.); Utsugi 75'; Kleiner (yellow card) 87'	Stadium: Providence Park; Attendance: 16,054; Referee: Karen ABT

May 12, 2018 6	Seattle Reign FC	4–1	Sky Blue FC	Seattle, Washington
19:00	Taylor 5' (yellow card) 88'; Rapinoe 38', 60'; Long 84'	Box; Report	Skroski (yellow card) 21'; McCaskill 62'	Stadium: Memorial Stadium; Attendance: 3,607; Referee: Mark Allatin

May 19, 2018 7	Seattle Reign FC	0–0	Chicago Red Stars	Seattle, Washington
19:00	McNabb (yellow card) 86'	Box; Report	Stanton (yellow card) 26'; Naughton (yellow card) 47'; Colaprico (yellow card) 90+1'	Stadium: Memorial Stadium; Attendance: 3,597; Referee: Katja Koroleva

May 23, 2018 8	Houston Dash	2–1	Seattle Reign FC	Houston, Texas
17:00	Mewis 68'; Latsko 90+2'	Box; Report	Yanez 13'; McNabb (yellow card) 67'	Stadium: BBVA Compass Stadium; Attendance: 2,376; Referee: Daniel Gutierrez

May 26, 2018 9	Sky Blue FC	0–1	Seattle Reign FC	Piscataway, New Jersey
19:00		Box; Report	Rapinoe 64'	Stadium: Yurcak Field; Attendance: 2,814; Referee: Jasmine Peralta

June 3, 2018 10	Seattle Reign FC	0–0	Orlando Pride	Seattle, Washington
18:00	Spencer (yellow card) 70'	Box; Report; Report 2	Zadorsky (yellow card) 79'	Stadium: Memorial Stadium; Attendance: 5,251; Referee: Danielle Chesky

June 16, 2018 11	Washington Spirit	0–0	Seattle Reign FC	Boyds, Maryland
16:00	Quinn (yellow card) 63'; Hatch (yellow card) 90+5'	Box; Report	Addo (yellow card) 47'; Taylor (yellow card) 90+2'	Stadium: Maryland SoccerPlex; Attendance: 3,509; Referee: Lorant Varga

June 23, 2018 12	Seattle Reign FC	1–4	North Carolina Courage	Seattle, Washington
13:00	Oyster 18'	Box; Report	Williams 27'; Dunn 33', 70'; Mathias 48'	Stadium: Memorial Stadium; Attendance: 4,032; Referee: Lukasz Szpala

June 27, 2018 13	Utah Royals FC	0–0	Seattle Reign FC	Sandy, Utah
19:00		Box; Report	Catley (yellow card) 59'	Stadium: Rio Tinto Stadium; Attendance: 8,504; Referee: Malik Badawi

June 30, 2018 14	Seattle Reign FC	1–0	Portland Thorns FC	Seattle, Washington
19:00	Barnes (yellow card) 35'; Taylor 89'	Box; Report	Klingenberg (yellow card) 14'	Stadium: Memorial Stadium; Attendance: 4,781; Referee: Christina Unkel

July 7, 2018 15	Seattle Reign FC	3–1	Houston Dash	Seattle, Washington
19:00	Taylor 37' (Rapinoe); Rapinoe 56' (pen.) (yellow card) 90+4'; Long 85' (Rapinoe)	Box; Report	Brooks 12' (Huerta); Chapman (yellow card) 59'	Stadium: Memorial Stadium; Attendance: 3,172; Referee: Reyna Fonesca

July 11, 2018 16	Seattle Reign FC	1–0	Utah Royals FC	Seattle, Washington
19:30	Rapinoe 54' (Catley); Long (yellow card) 45+3'	Box; Report	Johnson (yellow card) 12'; Corsie (yellow card) 45+2'; Gunnhildur (yellow card) 66'	Stadium: Memorial Stadium; Attendance: 3,191; Referee: Katja Koroleva

July 14, 2018 17	Chicago Red Stars	1–0	Seattle Reign FC	Bridgeview, Illinois
17:00	Kerr 86' (Nagasato)	Box; Report	Fishlock (yellow card) 35'	Stadium: Toyota Park; Attendance: 3,375; Referee: Natalie Simon

July 21, 2018 18	Orlando Pride	1–1	Seattle Reign FC	Orlando, Florida
12:30	Pressley 21'	Box; Report	Taylor 70' (Kawasumi); Barnes (yellow card) 90+1'	Stadium: Orlando City Stadium; Attendance: 5,074; Referee: Carol-Anne Chenard
Note: Televised on Lifetime.

August 5, 2018 19	Seattle Reign FC	2–0	Washington Spirit	Seattle, Washington
18:00	Spencer 44' (Long); Taylor 71' (Rapinoe); Oyster (yellow card) 84'	Box; Report		Stadium: Memorial Stadium; Attendance: 3,704; Referee: Mark Allatin

August 11, 2018 20	Utah Royals FC	0–1	Seattle Reign FC	Sandy, Utah
12:30	Moros (yellow card) 90'	Box; Report	Fishlock 48' (Oyster) (yellow card) 74'	Stadium: Rio Tinto Stadium; Attendance: 8,740; Referee: Eric Tattersall

August 15, 2018 21	Seattle Reign FC	0–0	Chicago Red Stars	Seattle, Washington
19:30	Oyster (yellow card) 47'	Box; Report	Kerr (yellow card) 27'; Colaprico (yellow card) 44'; Gilliland (yellow card) 75'	Stadium: Memorial Stadium; Attendance: 3,341; Referee: Lukasz Szpala

August 21, 2018 22	Seattle Reign FC	2–0	Houston Dash	Seattle, Washington
19:30	Oyster (yellow card) 28'; Taylor 58' (Nielsen), 61' (Rapinoe)	Box; Report	Brooks (yellow card) 83'	Stadium: Memorial Stadium; Attendance: 3,193; Referee: Katja Koroleva

August 25, 2018 23	Seattle Reign FC	1–1	North Carolina Courage	Seattle, Washington
13:00	Nielsen 67' (Fishlock); Taylor (yellow card) 79'	Box; Report	McDonald (yellow card) 23'; O'Sullivan (yellow card) 45+3'; Williams 90+6'	Stadium: Memorial Stadium; Attendance: 4,455; Referee: Ramy Touchan

September 7, 2018 24	Portland Thorns FC	3–1	Seattle Reign FC	Portland, Oregon
19:00	Horan 30', 82' (Heath); Heath 49'; Sonnett (yellow card) 60'	Box; Report	Fishlock 4' (Addo); Addo (yellow card) 62'; Catley (yellow card) 87'	Stadium: Providence Park; Attendance: 21,144; Referee: Tim Ford

==== Regular-season standings ====
Pos	Team	Pld	W	D	L	GF	GA	GD	Pts	
1	North Carolina Courage (C)	24	17	6	1	53	17	+36	57	NWSL Shield
2	Portland Thorns FC	24	12	6	6	40	28	+12	42	NWSL Playoffs
3	Seattle Reign FC	24	11	8	5	27	19	+8	41	NWSL Playoffs
4	Chicago Red Stars	24	9	10	5	38	28	+10	37	NWSL Playoffs
5	Utah Royals FC	24	9	8	7	22	23	−1	35	
6	Houston Dash	24	9	5	10	35	39	−4	32	
7	Orlando Pride	24	8	6	10	30	37	−7	30	
8	Washington Spirit	24	2	5	17	12	35	−23	11	
9	Sky Blue FC	24	1	6	17	21	52	−31	9	

Source: NWSL
Rules for classification: Tiebreakers
(C) Champions

===== Results summary =====
Overall								Home						Away					
Pld	W	D	L	GF	GA	GD	Pts	W	D	L	GF	GA	GD	W	D	L	GF	GA	GD
24	11	8	5	27	19	+8	41	7	4	1	17	8	+9	4	4	4	10	11	−1

Last updated: September 8, 2018.
Source: NWSLsoccer.com

===== Results by round =====
Round	1	2	3	4	5	6	7	8	9	10	11	12	13	14	15	16	17	18	19	20	21	22	23	24
Stadium	H	A	A	A	A	H	H	A	A	H	A	H	A	H	H	H	A	A	H	A	H	H	H	A
Result	W	W	L	D	W	W	D	L	W	D	D	L	D	W	W	W	L	D	W	W	D	W	D	L
Position (Note: SEA's position at the end of their matchday.)	1	2	4	4	2	2	2	2	2	2	2	3	3	2	2	2	2	2	2	2	2	2	2	3

Updated to match(es) played on September 8, 2018. Source: NWSLsoccer.com
A = Away; H = Home; W = Win; D = Draw; L = Loss

=== Playoffs ===
September 15, 2018 Semifinal	Portland Thorns FC	2–1	Seattle Reign FC	Portland, Oregon
18:00	Sonnett (yellow card) 27'; Heath 43' (Horan); Menges (yellow card) 50'; Horan 77' (Sinclair)	Box; Report	Spencer 29'; Fishlock (yellow card) 40'; Rapinoe (yellow card) 54'; Long (yellow card) 60'	Stadium: Providence Park; Attendance: 14,179; Referee: Ramy Touchan

== Appearances and goals ==
As of September 18, 2018
Only players who have made appearances are listed.

No.	Pos	Nat	Player	Total		Regular season		Playoffs	
No.	Pos	Nat	Player	Apps	Goals	Apps	Goals	Apps	Goals
Goalkeepers:
1	GK	(Australia) AUS	Lydia Williams	17	0	16	0	1	0
18	GK	(United States) USA	Michelle Betos	8	0	8	0	0	0
Defenders:
2	DF	(United States) USA	Yael Averbuch	1	0	1	0	0	0
3	DF	(United States) USA	Lauren Barnes	20	0	18+1	0	1	0
4	DF	(United States) USA	Megan Oyster	21	1	20	1	1	0
7	DF	(Australia) AUS	Steph Catley	17	0	16	0	1	0
8	DF	(Denmark) DEN	Theresa Nielsen	21	1	18+2	1	1	0
19	DF	(United States) USA	Kristen McNabb	20	0	12+8	0	0	0
21	DF	(United States) USA	Christen Westphal	12	0	9+3	0	0	0
24	DF	(United States) USA	Alyssa Kleiner	10	0	4+6	0	0	0
Midfielders:
6	MF	(United States) USA	Allie Long	20	3	19	3	1	0
10	MF	(Wales) WAL	Jess Fishlock	19	2	18	2	1	0
11	MF	(Ghana) GHA	Elizabeth Addo	13	0	8+4	0	0+1	0
12	MF	(United States) USA	Morgan Andrews	16	0	7+8	0	0+1	0
20	MF	(Japan) JPN	Rumi Utsugi	16	1	15	1	1	0
Forwards:
5	FW	(United States) USA	Kiersten Dallstream	3	0	2+1	0	0	0
9	FW	(Japan) JPN	Nahomi Kawasumi	14	0	11+3	0	0	0
13	FW	(Canada) CAN	Adriana Leon	6	0	1+5	0	0	0
14	FW	(England) ENG	Jodie Taylor	25	9	24	9	1	0
15	FW	(United States) USA	Megan Rapinoe	17	7	15+1	7	1	0
16	FW	(United States) USA	Jaycie Johnson	3	0	0+3	0	0	0
17	FW	(United States) USA	Beverly Yanez	20	2	14+5	2	0+1	0
22	FW	(United States) USA	Jasmyne Spencer	23	2	8+14	1	1	1
Players who left the club during the season:
26	DF	(United States) USA	Maddie Bauer	1	0	0+1	0	0	0

== Awards ==
=== The Best FIFA Women's Player ===
- Megan Rapinoe (nominee)

=== Ballon d'Or ===
- Megan Rapinoe (shortlisted)

=== ESPY Awards ===
- Best NWSL Player: Megan Rapinoe
- Best International Women's Soccer Player: Jodie Taylor (nominee)

=== The Guardian 100 Best Footballers in The World ===
- No. 10: Megan Rapinoe
- No. 36: Jodie Taylor
- No. 89: Nahomi Kawasumi

=== NWSL season awards ===
- Most Valuable Player: Megan Rapinoe (finalist)
- Goalkeeper of the Year: Lydia Williams (finalist)
- Coach of the Year: Vlatko Andonovski (finalist)
- Best XI: Megan Rapinoe
- Second XI: Steph Catley, Lydia Williams

=== Team season awards ===
- Most Valuable Player: Megan Rapinoe
- Defender of the Year: Lauren Barnes
- Newcomer of the Year: Allie Long
- Golden Boot: Jodie Taylor (9)

=== NWSL Player of the Month ===
Month	Result	Player	Ref.
March	Won	(United States) Megan Rapinoe	

=== NWSL Team of the Month ===
Month	Goalkeeper	Defenders	Midfielders	Forwards	Ref.
March				(United States) Megan Rapinoe	
May		(Australia) Steph Catley			
July		(Denmark) Theresa Nielsen		(United States) Megan Rapinoe	
August	(Australia) Lydia Williams	(Denmark) Theresa Nielsen (United States) Megan Oyster			

=== NWSL Player of the Week ===
Week	Result	Player	Ref.
1	Won	(United States) Megan Rapinoe	
7	Won	(United States) Megan Rapinoe	

=== NWSL Goal of the Week ===
Week	Result	Player	Ref.
1	Nominated	(United States) Megan Rapinoe	
6	Nominated	(Japan) Rumi Utsugi	
7	Nominated	(United States) Megan Rapinoe	
14	Nominated	(England) Jodie Taylor	
16	Nominated	(United States) Megan Rapinoe	
17	Nominated	(England) Jodie Taylor	
19	Nominated	(United States) Jasmyne Spencer	
20	Nominated	(Wales) Jess Fishlock	
22	Nominated	(England) Jodie Taylor	

=== NWSL Save of the Week ===
Week	Result	Player	Ref.
1	Nominated	(United States) Michelle Betos	
4	Nominated	(United States) Michelle Betos	
5	Nominated	(United States) Michelle Betos	
6	Nominated	(United States) Michelle Betos	
7	Nominated	(Australia) Lydia Williams	
8	Nominated	(Australia) Lydia Williams	
10	Nominated	(Australia) Lydia Williams	
13	Nominated	(Australia) Lydia Williams	
19	Nominated	(Australia) Lydia Williams	
21	Nominated	(Australia) Lydia Williams	
22	Nominated	(Australia) Lydia Williams	

== Contract extensions ==
Date	Player	Pos	Notes	Ref
October 23, 2017	(United States) Haley Kopmeyer	GK	Club options exercised	
October 23, 2017	(United States) Maddie Bauer	DF	Club options exercised	
October 23, 2017	(Scotland) Rachel Corsie	DF	Club options exercised	
October 23, 2017	(United States) Merritt Mathias	DF	Club options exercised	
October 23, 2017	(United States) Kristen McNabb	DF	Club options exercised	
October 23, 2017	(New Zealand) Rebekah Stott	DF	Club options exercised	
October 23, 2017	(United States) Christine Nairn	MF	Club options exercised	
October 23, 2017	(Australia) Larissa Crummer	FW	Club options exercised	
October 23, 2017	(United States) Kiersten Dallstream	FW	Club options exercised	
October 23, 2017	(Mexico) Katie Johnson	FW	Club options exercised	
October 23, 2017	(United States) Beverly Yanez	FW	Club options exercised	
November 29, 2017	(Japan) Nahomi Kawasumi	FW	Re-signed	
November 29, 2017	(Wales) Jess Fishlock	MF	Re-signed	
November 30, 2017	(Japan) Rumi Utsugi	MF	Re-signed	
December 5, 2017	(Australia) Lydia Williams	GK	Signed to a new contract	
January 22, 2018	(United States) Lauren Barnes	DF	Re-signed	

== Transfers ==
For transfers in, dates listed are when the Reign FC officially signed the players to the roster. Transactions where only the rights to the players are acquired (e.g., draft picks) are not listed, and amateur call-ups are not considered official signings either. For transfers out, dates listed are when the Reign FC officially removed the players from its roster, not when they signed with another club. If a player later signed with another club, her new club will be noted, but the date listed here remains the one when she was officially removed from the Reign FC roster.

=== Transfers in ===
Date	Player	Pos	Previous club	Notes	Ref
November 22, 2017	(England) Jodie Taylor	FW	(England) Arsenal	Free transfer after guest-player stint with Melbourne City	
January 11, 2018	(United States) Allie Long	MF	(United States) Portland Thorns FC	Traded for a conditional 2nd-round draft pick in the 2020 NWSL College Draft and the rights to Caitlin Foord	
January 18, 2018	(United States) Yael Averbuch	DF	(United States) Utah Royals FC	Traded, along with the 25th pick in the 2018 NWSL College Draft, for Diana Matheson	
January 29, 2018	(United States) Jasmyne Spencer	FW	(United States) Orlando Pride	Traded for Haley Kopmeyer and the club's natural 3rd-round pick in the 2019 NWSL College Draft	
January 30, 2018	(United States) Michelle Betos	GK	(Norway) Vålerenga	Free transfer	
January 30, 2018	(United States) Megan Oyster	DF	(United States) Boston Breakers	Contracted dispersal draft pick	
January 30, 2018	(Ghana) Elizabeth Addo	MF	(United States) Boston Breakers	Contracted dispersal draft pick	
January 30, 2018	(United States) Morgan Andrews	MF	(United States) Boston Breakers	Contracted dispersal draft pick	
January 30, 2018	(United States) Christen Westphal	DF	(United States) Boston Breakers	Contracted dispersal draft pick	
January 31, 2018	(Denmark) Theresa Nielsen	DF	(Norway) Vålerenga	Free transfer	
March 23, 2018	(United States) Adelaide Gay	GK	(Iceland) ÍBV	National Team Replacement player for Lydia Williams	
March 30, 2018	(United States) Jaycie Johnson	FW	(United States) Nebraska Cornhuskers	National Team Replacement player; signed standard player agreement on July 10	
May 1, 2018	(United States) Alyssa Kleiner	DF	(United States) Washington Spirit	Free transfer	
June 12, 2018	(Canada) Adriana Leon	FW	(United States) Sky Blue FC	Traded for a 4th-round pick in the 2019 NWSL College Draft	

==== Draft picks ====
Draft picks are not automatically signed to the team roster. Only those who are signed to a contract will be listed as transfers in. Only trades involving draft picks and executed on the days of the 2018 NWSL College Draft and the 2018 NWSL Dispersal Draft, respectively, will be listed in the notes.

Player	Pos	Previous club	Notes	Ref
(United States) Ally Haran	DF	(United States) Wake Forest Demon Deacons	College Draft Round 3, Pick 5 (25th overall); acquired from Utah Royals FC	
(Spain) Celia Jiménez Delgado	DF	(United States) Alabama Crimson Tide	College Draft Round 4, Pick 6 (36th overall)	
(United States) Megan Oyster	DF	(United States) Boston Breakers	Dispersal Draft Round 1, Pick 3 (3rd overall)	
(Ghana) Elizabeth Addo	MF	(United States) Boston Breakers	Dispersal Draft Round 1, Pick 8 (8th overall); acquired from Orlando Pride	
(United States) Morgan Andrews	MF	(United States) Boston Breakers	Dispersal Draft Round 2, Pick 2 (11th overall); acquired from Orlando Pride	
(United States) Christen Westphal	DF	(United States) Boston Breakers	Dispersal Draft Round 2, Pick 7 (16th overall)	
(United States) Lindsay Elston	MF	(United States) Boston Breakers	Dispersal Draft Round 3, Pick 3 (21st overall)	

=== Loans in ===
Start	End	Player	Pos	Parent Club	Notes	Ref
January 29, 2018	October 11, 2018	(Australia) Steph Catley	DF	(Australia) Melbourne City	Rights acquired from Orlando Pride for Carson Pickett and Christine Nairn	

=== Transfers out ===
Date	Player	Pos	Destination Club	Notes	Ref
September 22, 2017	(United States) Elli Reed	DF		Retired	
October 23, 2017	(United States) Madalyn Schiffel	GK		Retired	
January 11, 2018	(New Zealand) Rebekah Stott	DF	(United States) Sky Blue FC	Traded, along with Katie Johnson, for the rights to Caitlin Foord	
January 11, 2018	(Mexico) Katie Johnson	FW	(United States) Sky Blue FC	Traded, along with Rebekah Stott, for the rights to Caitlin Foord	
January 18, 2018	(Canada) Diana Matheson	MF	(United States) Utah Royals FC	Traded for Yael Averbuch and the 25th pick in the 2018 NWSL College Draft	
January 29, 2018	(United States) Carson Pickett	DF	(United States) Orlando Pride	Traded, along with Christine Nairn, for Steph Catley	
January 29, 2018	(United States) Christine Nairn	MF	(United States) Orlando Pride	Traded, along with Carson Pickett, for Steph Catley	
January 29, 2018	(United States) Haley Kopmeyer	GK	(United States) Orlando Pride	Traded, along with the club's natural 3rd-round pick in the 2019 NWSL College Draft, for Jasmyne Spencer	
January 31, 2018	(United States) Merritt Mathias	DF	(United States) North Carolina Courage	Traded, along with the club's natural 2nd-round pick in the 2019 NWSL College Draft, for the Courage's natural 1st-round pick in the 2019 NWSL College Draft	
January 31, 2018	(Scotland) Rachel Corsie	DF	(United States) Utah Royals FC	Waived	
February 19, 2018	(Australia) Larissa Crummer	FW	(Australia) Newcastle Jets	Waived	
April 25, 2018	(United States) Adelaide Gay	GK	(United States) Portland Thorns FC	National Team Replacement contract concluded	
July 16, 2018	(United States) Maddie Bauer	DF	(Sweden) Djurgården	Waived	
