= List of Seattle Reign FC players =

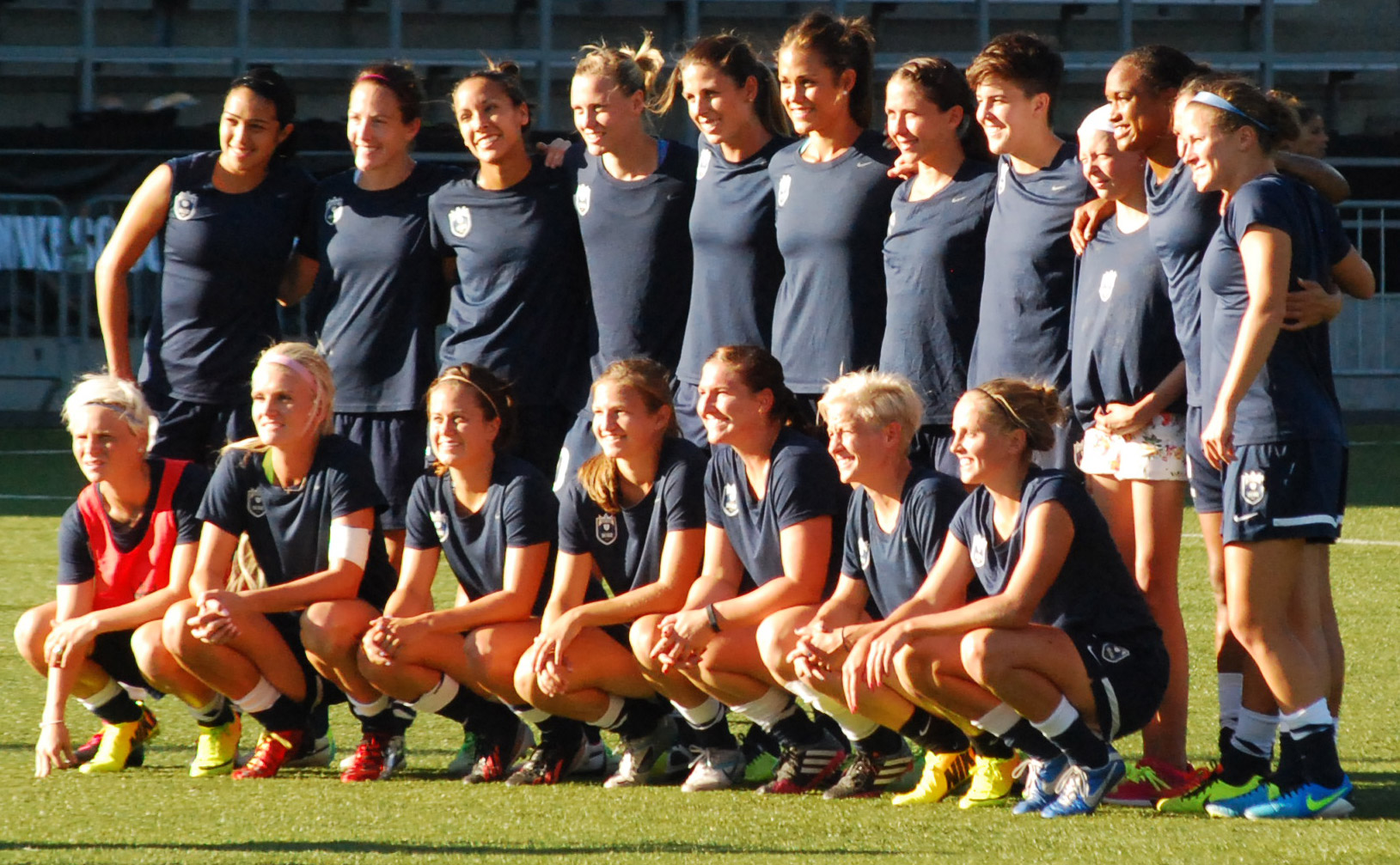
Seattle Reign FC pose for a photo before a match against the Chicago Red Stars on July 25, 2013.

Seattle Reign FC is an American soccer club founded in 2012. The club is an inaugural member of the National Women's Soccer League (NWSL) and began playing in the 2013 NWSL season.

This list includes all players who have made at least one competitive appearance for Seattle Reign FC. Playing statistics are correct as of November 7, 2025, and they are updated once a year after the conclusion of the NWSL season.

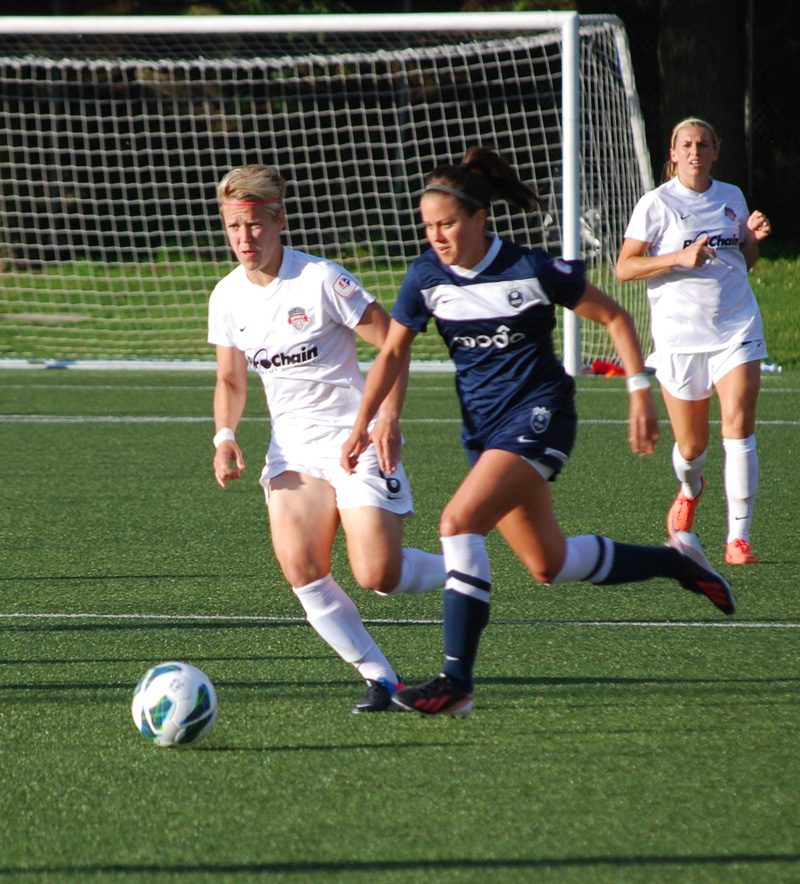
Lauren Barnes

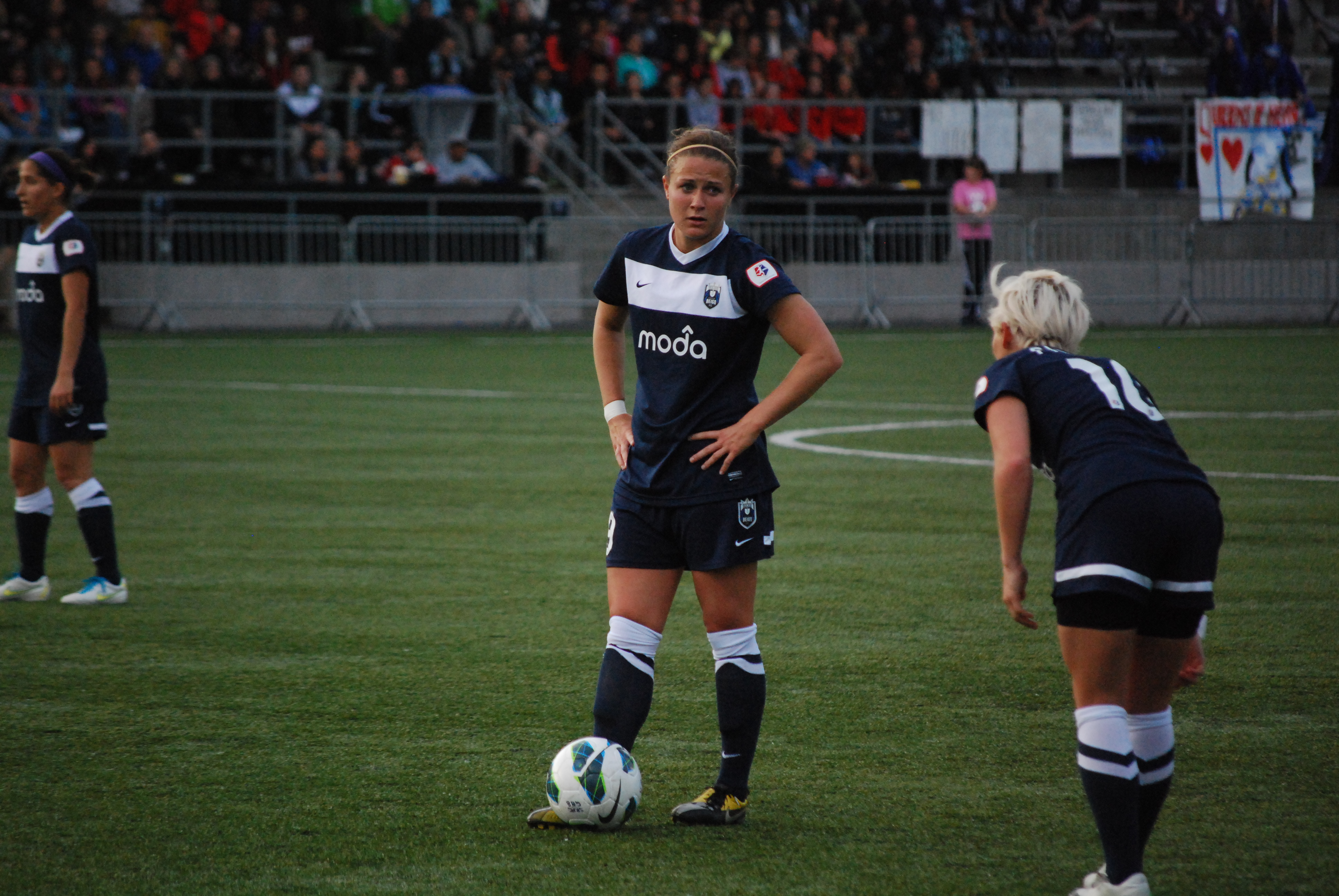
Christine Nairn and Jess Fishlock

== Appearances and goals ==
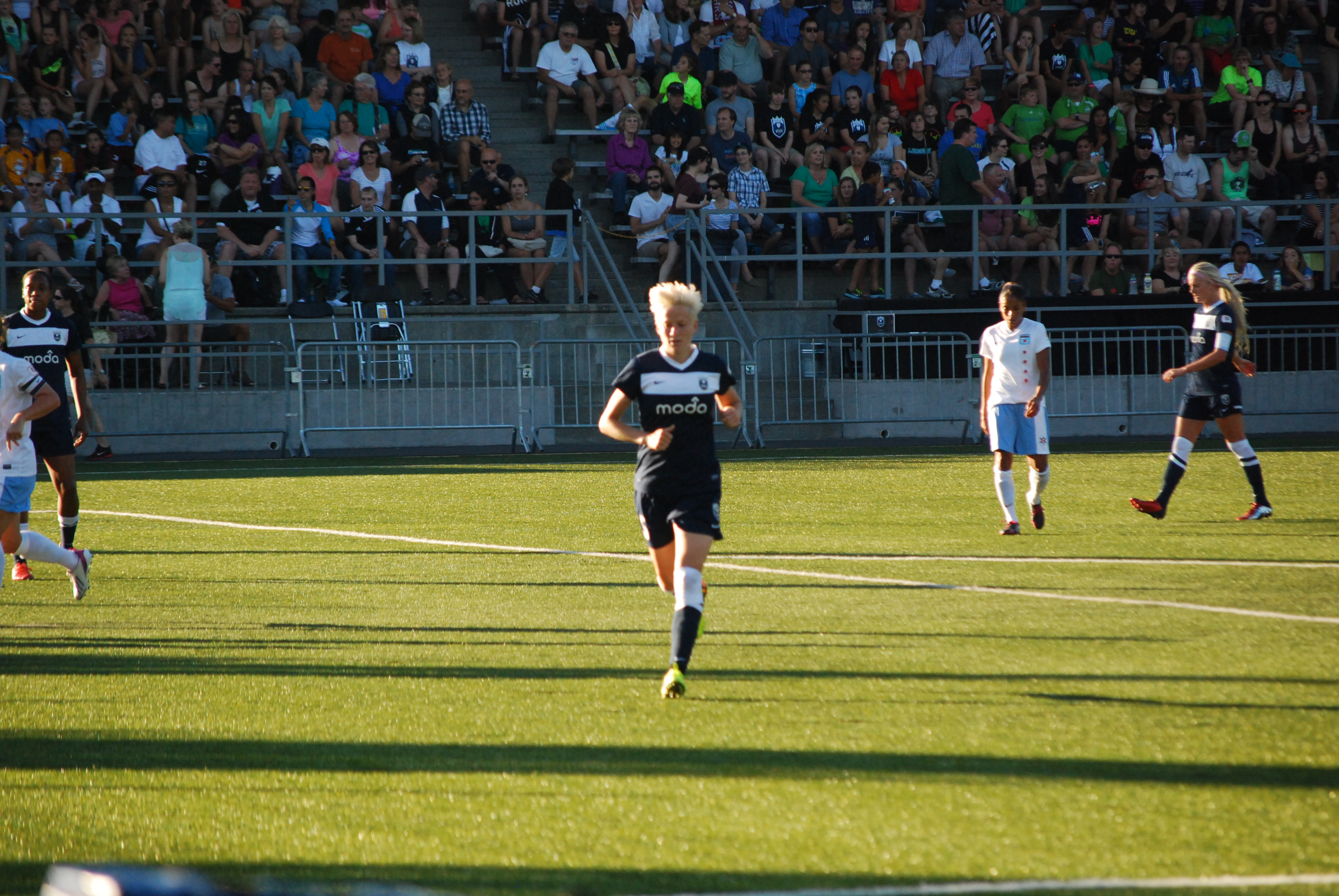
Megan Rapinoe

| Yrs | No. | Pos | Nat | Player | Total | | NWSL | | Playoffs | | Other cups (Note: Includes Challenge Cups, Summer Cups, and the Fall Series.) | |
| Yrs | No. | Pos | Nat | Player | Apps | Goals | Apps | Goals | Apps | Goals | Apps | Goals |
|---|---|---|---|---|---|---|---|---|---|---|---|---|
| 2024– | 47 | FW | (United States) USA | Emeri Adames | 46 | 8 | 42 | 7 | 1 | 0 | 3 | 1 |
| 2018 | 11 | MF | (Ghana) GHA | Elizabeth Addo | 13 | 0 | 12 | 0 | 1 | 0 | 0 | 0 |
| 2018–2020 | 12 | MF | (United States) USA | Morgan Andrews | 30 | 0 | 24 | 0 | 1 | 0 | 5 | 0 |
| 2022–2024 | 12 | MF | (United States) USA | Olivia Athens | 45 | 4 | 34 | 2 | 0 | 0 | 11 | 2 |
| 2018 | 2 | DF | (United States) USA | Yael Averbuch | 1 | 0 | 1 | 0 | 0 | 0 | 0 | 0 |
| 2019–2024 | 24,8 | FW | (United States) USA | Bethany Balcer | 135 | 39 | 103 | 33 | 6 | 0 | 26 | 6 |
| 2021 | 1 | GK | (England) ENG | Karen Bardsley | 7 | 0 | 3 | 0 | 0 | 0 | 4 | 0 |
| 2013–2025 | 3 | DF | (United States) USA | Lauren Barnes | 280 | 2 | 252 | 2 | 12 | 0 | 16 | 0 |
| 2017–2018 | 26 | DF | (United States) USA | Maddie Bauer | 6 | 0 | 6 | 0 | 0 | 0 | 0 | 0 |
| 2023 | 34 | FW | (United States) USA | Elyse Bennett | 29 | 3 | 21 | 2 | 1 | 0 | 7 | 1 |
| 2013, 2018–2020 | 18,1 | GK | (United States) USA | Michelle Betos | 22 | 0 | 19 | 0 | 0 | 0 | 3 | 0 |
| 2025– | 6 | FW | (United States) USA | Lynn Biyendolo | 13 | 2 | 13 | 2 | 0 | 0 | 0 | 0 |
| 2013 | 5 | FW | (United States) USA | Liz Bogus | 20 | 1 | 20 | 1 | 0 | 0 | 0 | 0 |
| 2021 | 12 | GK | (France) FRA | Sarah Bouhaddi | 20 | 0 | 19 | 0 | 1 | 0 | 0 | 0 |
| 2014 | 23 | DF | (United States) USA | Megan Brigman | 2 | 0 | 2 | 0 | 0 | 0 | 0 | 0 |
| 2015, 2020–2021 | 22,2 | DF | (United States) USA | Amber Brooks | 34 | 2 | 23 | 1 | 0 | 0 | 11 | 1 |
| 2022– | 22 | DF | (United States) USA | Ryanne Brown | 28 | 1 | 21 | 0 | 0 | 0 | 7 | 1 |
| 2024– | 32 | DF | (United States) USA | Jordyn Bugg | 34 | 3 | 31 | 3 | 1 | 0 | 2 | 0 |
| 2014–2015 | 20 | MF | (Samoa) SAM | Mariah Bullock | 30 | 1 | 28 | 0 | 2 | 1 | 0 | 0 |
| 2013–2017, 2022 | 7 | DF | (United States) USA | Elli Burris | 80 | 0 | 77 | 0 | 3 | 0 | 0 | 0 |
| 2013 | 9 | FW | (Jamaica) JAM | Tiffany Cameron | 7 | 0 | 7 | 0 | 0 | 0 | 0 | 0 |
| 2022–2023 | 13 | MF | (United States) USA | Marley Canales | 10 | 0 | 6 | 0 | 0 | 0 | 4 | 0 |
| 2018–2019 | 7 | DF | (Australia) AUS | Steph Catley | 33 | 0 | 31 | 0 | 2 | 0 | 0 | 0 |
| 2020–2024 | 4 | DF | (United States) USA | Alana Cook | 84 | 1 | 67 | 0 | 5 | 0 | 12 | 1 |
| 2013 | 26 | FW | (Trinidad and Tobago) TRI | Kennya Cordner | 2 | 0 | 2 | 0 | 0 | 0 | 0 | 0 |
| 2015–2017 | 4 | DF | (Scotland) SCO | Rachel Corsie | 44 | 3 | 42 | 3 | 2 | 0 | 0 | 0 |
| 2021–2023 | 6 | MF | (Brazil) BRA | Angelina | 36 | 1 | 28 | 0 | 0 | 0 | 8 | 1 |
| 2013–2015, 2019–2021 | 9,33 | DF | (United States) USA | Steph Cox | 70 | 0 | 55 | 0 | 5 | 0 | 10 | 0 |
| 2024– | 34 | FW | (Switzerland) SUI | Ana-Maria Crnogorčević | 22 | 0 | 22 | 0 | 0 | 0 | 0 | 0 |
| 2017 | 18 | FW | (Australia) AUS | Larissa Crummer | 4 | 1 | 4 | 1 | 0 | 0 | 0 | 0 |
| 2015–2016 | 21 | DF | (United States) USA | Michelle Cruz | 5 | 0 | 5 | 0 | 0 | 0 | 0 | 0 |
| 2020–2021 | 28 | MF | (Costa Rica) CRC | Shirley Cruz | 24 | 2 | 12 | 2 | 0 | 0 | 12 | 0 |
| 2013 | 23 | FW | (Mexico) MEX | Renae Cuéllar | 7 | 0 | 7 | 0 | 0 | 0 | 0 | 0 |
| 2025– | 24 | DF | (United States) USA | Madison Curry | 27 | 0 | 26 | 0 | 1 | 0 | 0 | 0 |
| 2025– | 5 | FW | (United States) USA | Maddie Dahlien | 27 | 4 | 26 | 4 | 1 | 0 | 0 | 0 |
| 2013–2019 | 25,5 | FW | (United States) USA | Kiersten Dallstream | 70 | 1 | 70 | 1 | 0 | 0 | 0 | 0 |
| 2021 | 33 | GK | (United States) USA | Ella Dederick | 3 | 0 | 3 | 0 | 0 | 0 | 0 | 0 |
| 2013–2014 | 4 | DF | (United States) USA | Kate Deines | 36 | 0 | 35 | 0 | 1 | 0 | 0 | 0 |
| 2022– | 30 | GK | (United States) USA | Claudia Dickey | 57 | 0 | 50 | 0 | 4 | 0 | 3 | 0 |
| 2023 | 54 | FW | (United States) USA | Jadyn Edwards | 1 | 0 | 0 | 0 | 0 | 0 | 1 | 0 |
| 2016–2017 | 6 | MF | (United States) USA | Lindsay Elston | 27 | 1 | 27 | 1 | 0 | 0 | 0 | 0 |
| 2025– | 19 | FW | (United States) USA | Mia Fishel | 12 | 0 | 11 | 0 | 1 | 0 | 0 | 0 |
| 2013– | 10 | MF | (Wales) WAL | Jess Fishlock | 242 | 49 | 215 | 48 | 11 | 0 | 16 | 1 |
| 2014–2016 | 13 | DF | (United States) USA | Kendall Fletcher | 66 | 5 | 62 | 5 | 4 | 0 | 0 | 0 |
| 2014–2015 | 18 | FW | (United States) USA | Danielle Foxhoven | 28 | 0 | 28 | 0 | 0 | 0 | 0 | 0 |
| 2020–2021 | 30 | DF | (United States) USA | Machaela George | 2 | 0 | 2 | 0 | 0 | 0 | 0 | 0 |
| 2024–2025 | 31 | DF | (Sweden) SWE | Hanna Glas | 8 | 0 | 8 | 0 | 0 | 0 | 0 | 0 |
| 2019 | 2 | FW | (United States) USA | Shea Groom | 16 | 2 | 15 | 2 | 1 | 0 | 0 | 0 |
| 2020–2021 | 99 | DF | (United States) USA | Madison Hammond | 21 | 0 | 13 | 0 | 0 | 0 | 8 | 0 |
| 2020 | 33 | DF | (United States) USA | Kim Hazlett | 1 | 0 | 0 | 0 | 0 | 0 | 1 | 0 |
| 2022 | 77 | FW | (United States) USA | Tobin Heath | 5 | 1 | 5 | 1 | 0 | 0 | 0 | 0 |
| 2020–2021 | 25 | MF | (United States) USA | Kelcie Hedge | 2 | 0 | 2 | 0 | 0 | 0 | 0 | 0 |
| 2020–2023 | 27 | DF | (United States) USA | Sam Hiatt | 59 | 1 | 44 | 0 | 1 | 0 | 14 | 1 |
| 2023– | 25 | DF | (United States) USA | Shae Holmes | 49 | 1 | 40 | 1 | 0 | 0 | 9 | 0 |
| 2024 | 16 | MF | (United States) USA | Jaelin Howell | 8 | 0 | 8 | 0 | 0 | 0 | 0 | 0 |
| 2020– | 20,11 | DF | (United States) USA | Sofia Huerta | 121 | 10 | 91 | 6 | 6 | 0 | 24 | 4 |
| 2022– | 9 | FW | (Canada) CAN | Jordyn Huitema | 79 | 15 | 70 | 13 | 5 | 0 | 4 | 2 |
| 2022–2024 | 18 | GK | (United States) USA | Laurel Ivory | 16 | 0 | 9 | 0 | 0 | 0 | 7 | 0 |
| 2024– | 6 | MF | (Wales) WAL | Angharad James-Turner | 31 | 1 | 29 | 1 | 0 | 0 | 2 | 0 |
| 2019–2020 | 11 | FW | (United States) USA | Darian Jenkins | 23 | 4 | 17 | 4 | 1 | 0 | 5 | 0 |
| 2024– | 91 | MF | (South Korea) KOR | Ji So-yun | 41 | 5 | 39 | 5 | 0 | 0 | 2 | 0 |
| 2019–2021 | 13 | DF | (Spain) ESP | Celia | 33 | 2 | 24 | 1 | 1 | 0 | 8 | 1 |
| 2018–2019 | 16 | FW | (United States) USA | Jaycie Johnson | 4 | 0 | 4 | 0 | 0 | 0 | 0 | 0 |
| 2017 | 33 | FW | (Mexico) MEX | Katie Johnson | 23 | 4 | 23 | 4 | 0 | 0 | 0 | 0 |
| 2020 | 29 | DF | (United States) USA | Adrienne Jordan | 1 | 0 | 0 | 0 | 0 | 0 | 1 | 0 |
| 2014, 2016–2018 | 9,36 | FW | (Japan) JPN | Nahomi Kawasumi | 70 | 18 | 68 | 18 | 2 | 0 | 0 | 0 |
| 2019 | 88 | MF | (Australia) AUS | Elise Kellond-Knight | 3 | 0 | 3 | 0 | 0 | 0 | 0 | 0 |
| 2019 | 44 | MF | (Canada) CAN | Maegan Kelly | 6 | 0 | 6 | 0 | 0 | 0 | 0 | 0 |
| 2021–2024 | 23 | FW | (United States) USA | Tziarra King | 85 | 6 | 67 | 5 | 1 | 0 | 17 | 1 |
| 2018 | 24 | DF | (United States) USA | Alyssa Kleiner | 10 | 0 | 10 | 0 | 0 | 0 | 0 | 0 |
| 2013–2017 | 20,28 | GK | (United States) USA | Haley Kopmeyer | 47 | 0 | 47 | 0 | 0 | 0 | 0 | 0 |
| 2013 | 6 | MF | (Canada) CAN | Kaylyn Kyle | 21 | 3 | 21 | 3 | 0 | 0 | 0 | 0 |
| 2013 | 14 | FW | (United States) USA | Kristina Larsen | 9 | 0 | 9 | 0 | 0 | 0 | 0 | 0 |
| 2022–2025 | 24 | FW | (United States) USA | Veronica Latsko | 81 | 11 | 61 | 8 | 3 | 2 | 17 | 1 |
| 2021–2023 | 16 | MF | (United States) USA | Rose Lavelle | 42 | 8 | 32 | 6 | 5 | 1 | 5 | 1 |
| 2021 | 9 | FW | (France) FRA | Eugénie Le Sommer | 18 | 8 | 17 | 7 | 1 | 1 | 0 | 0 |
| 2020 | 18 | FW | (United States) USA | Mariah Lee | 1 | 0 | 0 | 0 | 0 | 0 | 1 | 0 |
| 2018 | 13 | FW | (Canada) CAN | Adriana Leon | 6 | 0 | 6 | 0 | 0 | 0 | 0 | 0 |
| 2014 | 2 | FW | (United States) USA | Sydney Leroux | 24 | 5 | 22 | 5 | 2 | 0 | 0 | 0 |
| 2024– | 13 | DF | (United States) USA | Julia Lester | 7 | 0 | 5 | 0 | 0 | 0 | 2 | 0 |
| 2014–2016, 2022 | 8,26 | MF | (Scotland) SCO | Kim Little | 73 | 33 | 69 | 32 | 4 | 1 | 0 | 0 |
| 2018–2021 | 6 | MF | (United States) USA | Allie Long | 41 | 3 | 33 | 3 | 2 | 0 | 6 | 0 |
| 2021–2024 | 30,14 | DF | (Mexico) MEX | Jimena López | 13 | 0 | 9 | 0 | 0 | 0 | 4 | 0 |
| 2022–2023 | 20 | DF | (United States) USA | Alyssa Malonson | 9 | 0 | 4 | 0 | 0 | 0 | 5 | 0 |
| 2021 | 8 | MF | (Germany) GER | Dzsenifer Marozsán | 20 | 0 | 19 | 0 | 1 | 0 | 0 | 0 |
| 2025– | 14 | DF | (United States) USA | Emily Mason | 12 | 0 | 12 | 0 | 0 | 0 | 0 | 0 |
| 2015–2017 | 9 | DF | (United States) USA | Merritt Mathias | 60 | 5 | 58 | 5 | 2 | 0 | 0 | 0 |
| 2024– | 46 | MF | (United States) USA | Ainsley McCammon | 21 | 1 | 18 | 1 | 1 | 0 | 2 | 0 |
| 2022– | 21 | DF | (United States) USA | Phoebe McClernon | 83 | 0 | 70 | 0 | 5 | 0 | 8 | 0 |
| 2013 | 21 | FW | (United States) USA | Jessica McDonald | 7 | 3 | 7 | 3 | 0 | 0 | 0 | 0 |
| 2017–2021 | 19 | DF | (United States) USA | Kristen McNabb | 87 | 2 | 74 | 2 | 2 | 0 | 11 | 0 |
| 2013 | 21 | DF | (United States) USA | Kristen Meier | 6 | 0 | 6 | 0 | 0 | 0 | 0 | 0 |
| 2016 | 14 | FW | (Netherlands) NED | Manon Melis | 16 | 7 | 16 | 7 | 0 | 0 | 0 | 0 |
| 2025– | 18 | MF | (United States) USA | Sally Menti | 16 | 1 | 15 | 1 | 1 | 0 | 0 | 0 |
| 2024– | 27 | MF | (United States) USA | Maddie Mercado | 23 | 2 | 19 | 1 | 1 | 0 | 3 | 1 |
| 2024– | 20 | MF | (United States) USA | Sam Meza | 29 | 0 | 26 | 0 | 1 | 0 | 2 | 0 |
| 2022 | 19 | DF | (United States) USA | Sinclaire Miramontez | 7 | 0 | 4 | 0 | 0 | 0 | 3 | 0 |
| 2020–2021 | 21 | FW | (Japan) JPN | Nicole Momiki | 8 | 0 | 0 | 0 | 0 | 0 | 8 | 0 |
| 2024– | 30 | FW | (Haiti) HAI | Nerilia Mondésir | 31 | 1 | 30 | 1 | 1 | 0 | 0 | 0 |
| 2014 | 5 | DF | (Canada) CAN | Carmelina Moscato | 1 | 0 | 1 | 0 | 0 | 0 | 0 | 0 |
| 2019–2020 | 26 | GK | (United States) USA | Casey Murphy | 26 | 0 | 19 | 0 | 1 | 0 | 6 | 0 |
| 2013, 2017 | 19,2 | MF | (United States) USA | Christine Nairn | 45 | 4 | 45 | 4 | 0 | 0 | 0 | 0 |
| 2016 | 12 | DF | (United States) USA | Paige Nielsen | 2 | 0 | 2 | 0 | 0 | 0 | 0 | 0 |
| 2018–2019 | 8 | DF | (Denmark) DEN | Theresa Nielsen | 43 | 1 | 41 | 1 | 2 | 0 | 0 | 0 |
| 2020 | 18 | FW | (Thailand) THA | Miranda Nild | 2 | 0 | 0 | 0 | 0 | 0 | 2 | 0 |
| 2013 | 8 | MF | (Mexico) MEX | Teresa Noyola | 11 | 1 | 11 | 1 | 0 | 0 | 0 | 0 |
| 2019 | 25 | FW | (Nigeria) NGA | Ifeoma Onumonu | 21 | 3 | 20 | 2 | 1 | 1 | 0 | 0 |
| 2018–2019 | 4 | DF | (United States) USA | Megan Oyster | 41 | 1 | 40 | 1 | 1 | 0 | 0 | 0 |
| 2013 | 16 | MF | (United States) USA | Lyndsey Patterson | 3 | 0 | 3 | 0 | 0 | 0 | 0 | 0 |
| 2016–2017 | 16 | DF | (United States) USA | Carson Pickett | 36 | 0 | 36 | 0 | 0 | 0 | 0 | 0 |
| 2019 | 14 | MF | (United States) USA | Morgan Proffitt | 6 | 0 | 6 | 0 | 0 | 0 | 0 | 0 |
| 2020–2021 | 35 | FW | (United States) USA | Leah Pruitt | 19 | 2 | 11 | 0 | 0 | 0 | 8 | 2 |
| 2019–2024 | 5 | MF | (Canada) CAN | Quinn | 85 | 1 | 65 | 1 | 5 | 0 | 15 | 0 |
| 2013–2023 | 15 | FW | (United States) USA | Megan Rapinoe | 132 | 55 | 115 | 52 | 11 | 3 | 6 | 0 |
| 2013 | 13 | DF | (Mexico) MEX | Jenny Ruiz | 7 | 0 | 7 | 0 | 0 | 0 | 0 | 0 |
| 2017 | 24 | GK | (United States) USA | Madalyn Schiffel | 1 | 0 | 1 | 0 | 0 | 0 | 0 | 0 |
| 2019–2020 | 23 | DF | (United States) USA | Taylor Smith | 7 | 0 | 0 | 0 | 0 | 0 | 7 | 0 |
| 2015–2016 | 19 | MF | (Jamaica) JAM | Havana Solaun | 6 | 1 | 6 | 1 | 0 | 0 | 0 | 0 |
| 2013–2016 | 1 | GK | (United States) USA | Hope Solo | 54 | 0 | 50 | 0 | 4 | 0 | 0 | 0 |
| 2023 | 2 | DF | (United States) USA | Emily Sonnett | 25 | 0 | 19 | 0 | 3 | 0 | 3 | 0 |
| 2018–2021 | 22 | FW | (United States) USA | Jasmyne Spencer | 33 | 2 | 23 | 1 | 1 | 1 | 9 | 0 |
| 2015 | 12 | GK | (United States) USA | Caroline Stanley | 1 | 0 | 1 | 0 | 0 | 0 | 0 | 0 |
| 2022–2024 | 2,7 | MF | (United States) USA | Nikki Stanton | 52 | 1 | 35 | 0 | 2 | 0 | 15 | 1 |
| 2019 | 27 | FW | (United States) USA | Addison Steiner | 5 | 0 | 5 | 0 | 0 | 0 | 0 | 0 |
| 2017 | | DF | (New Zealand) NZL | Rebekah Stott | 22 | 0 | 22 | 0 | 0 | 0 | 0 | 0 |
| 2018–2020 | 14,9 | FW | (England) ENG | Jodie Taylor | 47 | 14 | 40 | 14 | 2 | 0 | 5 | 0 |
| 2013 | 17 | FW | (United States) USA | Lindsay Taylor | 6 | 1 | 6 | 1 | 0 | 0 | 0 | 0 |
| 2016 | 24 | GK | (United States) USA | Andi Tostanoski | 2 | 0 | 2 | 0 | 0 | 0 | 0 | 0 |
| 2021–2023 | 91 | GK | (United States) USA | Phallon Tullis-Joyce | 47 | 0 | 39 | 0 | 1 | 0 | 7 | 0 |
| 2016–2019 | 20 | MF | (Japan) JPN | Rumi Utsugi | 48 | 3 | 47 | 3 | 1 | 0 | 0 | 0 |
| 2022– | 33 | MF | (United States) USA | Olivia Van der Jagt | 68 | 2 | 56 | 1 | 3 | 0 | 9 | 1 |
| 2013 | 20 | MF | (Australia) AUS | Emily van Egmond | 6 | 0 | 6 | 0 | 0 | 0 | 0 | 0 |
| 2015 | 24 | FW | (Denmark) DEN | Katrine Veje | 11 | 0 | 9 | 0 | 2 | 0 | 0 | 0 |
| 2023 | 31 | MF | (United States) USA | Natalie Viggiano | 3 | 0 | 0 | 0 | 0 | 0 | 3 | 0 |
| 2021–2022 | 7 | FW | (United States) USA | Ally Watt | 26 | 1 | 18 | 0 | 1 | 0 | 7 | 1 |
| 2020–2021 | 17 | MF | (United States) USA | Dani Weatherholt | 31 | 0 | 19 | 0 | 1 | 0 | 11 | 0 |
| 2023–2024 | 51 | FW | (United States) USA | McKenzie Weinert | 9 | 0 | 6 | 0 | 0 | 0 | 3 | 0 |
| 2018–2019 | 21 | DF | (United States) USA | Christen Westphal | 16 | 0 | 16 | 0 | 0 | 0 | 0 | 0 |
| 2019–2021 | 31 | MF | (New Zealand) NZL | Rosie White | 17 | 3 | 10 | 2 | 0 | 0 | 7 | 1 |
| 2017–2019 | 6,1 | GK | (Australia) AUS | Lydia Williams | 21 | 0 | 20 | 0 | 1 | 0 | 0 | 0 |
| 2013–2016 | 11 | MF | (United States) USA | Keelin Winters | 87 | 6 | 83 | 6 | 4 | 0 | 0 | 0 |
| 2024– | 17 | DF | (Wales) WAL | Lily Woodham | 9 | 0 | 8 | 0 | 0 | 0 | 1 | 0 |
| 2014–2019 | 17 | FW | (United States) USA | Bev Yanez | 129 | 25 | 123 | 24 | 6 | 1 | 0 | 0 |
| 2013 | 2 | DF | (Canada) CAN | Emily Zurrer | 7 | 0 | 7 | 0 | 0 | 0 | 0 | 0 |
