= 2017 Seattle Reign FC season =

Seattle Reign FC
2017 season
- Owners: Bill and Teresa Predmore
- General manager: Laura Harvey
- Head coach: Laura Harvey
- Stadium: Memorial Stadium
- NWSL: 5th
- Top goalscorer: Megan Rapinoe (12)
- Highest home attendance: 6,041 (August 26 vs. POR)
- Lowest home attendance: 2,727 (April 22 vs. HOU)
- Average home league attendance: 4,037
Home colors	Away colors

The 2017 Seattle Reign FC season was the club's fifth season of play in the National Women's Soccer League (NWSL), the top division of women's soccer in the United States.

Incorporating schedule disruptions caused by the 2015 FIFA Women's World Cup and the 2016 Summer Olympics, teams competed in 24 games during the regular season, a schedule last played during the 2014 season.

== Club ==
=== Coaching staff ===
Position	Staff
General Manager & Head Coach	(England) Laura Harvey
Assistant Coach	(England) Sam Laity
Assistant Coach	(United States) Stephanie Cox
Goalkeeper Coach	(Guam) Doug Herrick
Director of High Performance	(Australia) Nick Leman

Last updated: June 18, 2017
Source: https://medium.com/@ReignFC/kim-calkins-named-technical-director-of-reign-academy-370eae9ff922

=== Roster ===
As of September 1, 2017

Note: Flags indicate national team as defined under FIFA eligibility rules; some limited exceptions apply. Players may hold more than one non-FIFA nationality.

No.	Pos.	Nation	Player
2	MF	USA	Christine Nairn
3	DF	USA	Lauren Barnes (co-captain)
4	DF	SCO	Rachel Corsie
5	FW	USA	Kiersten Dallstream
6	GK	AUS	Lydia Williams
7	DF	USA	Elli Reed
8	MF	CAN	Diana Matheson
9	DF	USA	Merritt Mathias
10	MF	WAL	Jess Fishlock (co-captain)
13	DF	NZL	Rebekah Stott
15	FW	USA	Megan Rapinoe

No.	Pos.	Nation	Player
16	DF	USA	Carson Pickett
17	FW	USA	Beverly Yanez
18	FW	AUS	Larissa Crummer
19	MF	USA	Kristen McNabb
20	MF	JPN	Rumi Utsugi
24	GK	USA	Madalyn Schiffel
26	DF	USA	Maddie Bauer
28	GK	USA	Haley Kopmeyer
33	FW	MEX	Katie Johnson
36	FW	JPN	Nahomi Kawasumi

== Competitions ==
Win Tie Loss

All match times are listed in PT unless otherwise noted.

=== Preseason ===
April 4, 2017	UCLA Bruins	2–3	Seattle Reign FC	Norco, California
19:30	Rodriguez 34'; Dunphy 59'	Report	Kawasumi 15'; Dallstream 66'; Nairn 85'	Stadium: SilverLakes Complex

April 8, 2017	Washington Huskies	0–3	Seattle Reign FC	Seattle, Washington
19:00		Report	Yanez 22'; Kawasumi 52'; Dallstream 64'	Stadium: Husky Soccer Stadium

=== Regular season ===
April 15, 2017 1	Seattle Reign FC	1–1	Sky Blue FC	Seattle, Washington
19:00	Rapinoe 56' (pen.); Mathias (yellow card) 62'	Box; Report	Killion 62' (pen.)	Stadium: Memorial Stadium; Attendance: 3,521; Referee: Karen ABT

April 22, 2017 2	Seattle Reign FC	5–1	Houston Dash	Seattle, Washington
19:00	Fishlock 18'; Rapinoe 27'; McNabb 31'; Yanez 55'; Johnson 74'; Corsie (yellow card) 83'	Box; Report	Poliana 84'	Stadium: Memorial Stadium; Attendance: 2,727; Referee: Marco Vega

April 29, 2017 3	Boston Breakers	3–0	Seattle Reign FC	Boston, Massachusetts
16:00	Leon 11'; Lavelle 15'; White (yellow card) 35'; Dowie 52'; Chapman (yellow card) 76'	Box; Report	Fishlock (yellow card) 32'; Mathias (yellow card) 38'	Stadium: Jordan Field; Attendance: 2,315; Referee: Charles Murphy

May 6, 2017 4	Portland Thorns FC	2–2	Seattle Reign FC	Portland, Oregon
19:00	Fishlock 37' (o.g.); Henry (yellow card) 73'; Long 82'; Horan (yellow card) 90+2'	Box; Report	Fishlock 1' (yellow card) 66'; Mathias 39'; Rapinoe (yellow card) 57'	Stadium: Providence Park; Attendance: 16,160; Referee: Christina Unkel

May 13, 2017 5	Seattle Reign FC	6–2	Washington Spirit	Seattle, Washington
13:00	Nairn 20'; Yanez 35'; Kawasumi 69'; Rapinoe 71', 76'; Elston 79'	Box; Report	Solaun 60' (pen.); Mewis 88'	Stadium: Memorial Stadium; Attendance: 3,007; Referee: Victor Rivas

May 21, 2017 6	Seattle Reign FC	1–1	Orlando Pride	Seattle, Washington
18:30	Yanez 40'; Barnes (yellow card) 49'; Rapinoe (yellow card) 50'	Box; Report	Marta 52' (yellow card) 90+4'; Camila (yellow card) 83'	Stadium: Memorial Stadium; Attendance: 4,037; Referee: Timothy Ford

May 27, 2017 7	Houston Dash	0–2	Seattle Reign FC	Houston, Texas
13:00		Box; Report	Roccaro 30' (o.g.); Johnson 64'	Stadium: BBVA Compass Stadium; Attendance: 5,312; Referee: Karen ABT

June 4, 2017 8	Chicago Red Stars	1–0	Seattle Reign FC	Bridgeview, Illinois
12:00	Press 49'	Box; Report	Rapinoe (yellow card) 89'	Stadium: Toyota Park; Attendance: 3,147; Referee: Malik Badawi

June 17, 2017 9	FC Kansas City	2–2	Seattle Reign FC	Kansas City, Missouri
13:00	Newfield 23'; Groom (yellow card) 76'; Kelly 84'; Leroux (yellow card) 90'	Box; Report	Rapinoe 31'; Elston (yellow card) 73'; Pickett (yellow card) 74'; Kawasumi 81'	Stadium: Swope Soccer Village; Attendance: 1,891; Referee: Farhad Dadkho

June 24, 2017 10	Seattle Reign FC	1–1	FC Kansas City	Seattle, Washington
19:00	Barnes (red card) 4'; Kawasumi 58'	Box; Report	Ratcliffe 16'; Newfield (yellow card) 30'; Groom (yellow card) 34'	Stadium: Memorial Stadium; Attendance: 3,919; Referee: Katja Koroleva

June 28, 2017 11	Seattle Reign FC	2–1	Chicago Red Stars	Seattle, Washington
19:30	Rapinoe 58' (pen.), 84' (pen.)	Box; Report	Mautz 41'; Johnson (yellow card) 69'	Stadium: Memorial Stadium; Attendance: 3,586; Referee: Christopher Spivey

July 1, 2017 12	Seattle Reign FC	2–0	Portland Thorns FC	Seattle, Washington
19:00	Rapinoe 45+1', 81'; McNabb (yellow card) 77'	Box; Report	Sinclair (yellow card) 64'; Brynjarsdottir (yellow card) 72'; Raso (yellow card) 90+1'	Stadium: Memorial Stadium; Attendance: 4,270; Referee: Jon Freemon

July 8, 2017 13	North Carolina Courage	2–0	Seattle Reign FC	Cary, North Carolina
13:00	Hatch 33' (yellow card) 75'; Zerboni 81'	Box; Report	McNabb (yellow card) 71'	Stadium: WakeMed Soccer Park; Attendance: 3,565; Referee: Matthew Franz

July 15, 2017 14	Seattle Reign FC	1–1	Boston Breakers	Seattle, Washington
13:00	Kawasumi 32'	Box; Report	Leon 43'	Stadium: Memorial Stadium; Attendance: 3,730; Referee: Ramy Touchan

July 22, 2017 15	Seattle Reign FC	5–4	Sky Blue FC	Seattle, Washington
19:00	Rapinoe 27', 47' (pen.), 87' (yellow card) 80'; Mathias (yellow card) 30'; Yanez 49'; Skroski 56' (o.g.)	Box; Report	O'Hara 60' (pen.); Galton 64'; Corboz 72'; Kerr 76'; Tiernan (yellow card) 89'	Stadium: Memorial Stadium; Attendance: 4,464; Referee: Greg Dopka

August 5, 2017 16	North Carolina Courage	1–0	Seattle Reign FC	Cary, North Carolina
13:00	Williams 32'	Box; Report	Stott (yellow card) 24'; Barnes (yellow card) 86'	Stadium: WakeMed Soccer Park; Attendance: 5,249; Referee: Elvis Osmanovic

August 13, 2017 17	Seattle Reign FC	1–2	North Carolina Courage	Seattle, Washington
18:00	Utsugi 40'	Box; Report	Mewis 24', 74'	Stadium: Memorial Stadium; Attendance: 4,156; Referee: Karen ABT

August 16, 2017 18	Chicago Red Stars	1–2	Seattle Reign FC	Bridgeview, Illinois
17:00	Hoy 23'	Box; Report	Nairn (yellow card) 74'; Kawasumi 90'; Johnson 90+2'	Stadium: Toyota Park; Attendance: 2,876; Referee: Danielle Chesky

August 19, 2017 19	Sky Blue FC	5–4	Seattle Reign FC	Piscataway, New Jersey
16:00	Kerr 48', 68', 71', 90+4'; Hayes 90+1', (yellow card) 81'	Box; Report	Johnson 3'; Fishlock 18'; Kawasumi 45+2'; Dallstream 85'	Stadium: Yurcak Field; Attendance: 3,325; Referee: Christopher Spivey

August 26, 2017 20	Seattle Reign FC	1–2	Portland Thorns FC	Seattle, Washington
13:00	McNabb (yellow card) 60'; Barnes (yellow card) 68'; Fishlock 90' (pen.)	Box; Report	Raso 49', 86' (yellow card) 90+3'; Brynjarsdóttir (yellow card) 77'; Klingenberg (yellow card) 90'	Stadium: Memorial Stadium; Attendance: 6,041; Referee: Farhad Dadkho

September 3, 2017 21	Houston Dash	0–1	Seattle Reign FC	Frisco, Texas
17:00	Benites (yellow card) 88'	Box; Report	Mathias 50'; Barnes (yellow card) 77'; Fishlock (yellow card) 80'	Stadium: Toyota Stadium; Attendance: 1258; Referee: Rosendo Mendoza

September 7, 2017 22	Orlando Pride	1–1	Seattle Reign FC	Orlando, Florida
17:00	Morgan 90+2'	Box; Report	Pickett (yellow card) 37'; Mathias (yellow card) 57'; Barnes (yellow card) 90+1'; Fishlock 90+4'	Stadium: Orlando City Stadium; Attendance: 4,341; Referee: Daniel Gutierrez

September 24, 2017 23	Seattle Reign FC	0–1	FC Kansas City	Seattle, Washington
18:00	Rapinoe (yellow card) 69'	Box; Report	Groom 23'	Stadium: Memorial Stadium; Attendance: 4,991; Referee: Karen ABT

September 30, 2017 24	Washington Spirit	2–3	Seattle Reign FC	Boyds, Maryland
13:00	Pugh 27', 32'	Box; Report	Fishlock 71', 90'; Crummer 83'	Stadium: Maryland SoccerPlex; Attendance: 3,780; Referee: Danielle Chesky

==== Regular-season standings ====
Pos	Team	Pld	W	D	L	GF	GA	GD	Pts	Qualification
1	North Carolina Courage	24	16	1	7	38	22	+16	49	NWSL Shield
2	Portland Thorns FC (C)	24	14	5	5	37	20	+17	47	NWSL Playoffs
3	Orlando Pride	24	11	7	6	45	31	+14	40	NWSL Playoffs
4	Chicago Red Stars	24	11	6	7	33	30	+3	39	NWSL Playoffs
5	Seattle Reign FC	24	9	7	8	43	37	+6	34	
6	Sky Blue FC	24	10	3	11	42	51	−9	33	
7	FC Kansas City	24	8	7	9	29	31	−2	31	
8	Houston Dash	24	7	3	14	23	39	−16	24	
9	Boston Breakers	24	4	7	13	24	35	−11	19	
10	Washington Spirit	24	5	4	15	30	48	−18	19	

Source: NWSL
Rules for classification: Tiebreakers
(C) Champions

===== Results summary =====
Overall								Home						Away					
Pld	Pts	W	L	T	GF	GA	GD	W	L	T	GF	GA	GD	W	L	T	GF	GA	GD
24	34	9	8	7	43	37	+6	5	3	4	26	17	+9	4	5	3	17	20	−3

Last updated: October 2, 2017
Source: NWSLsoccer.com
Pld = Matches played; Pts = Points; W = Matches won; T = Matches tied; L = Matches lost; GF = Goals for; GA = Goals against; GD = Goal difference

===== Results by matchday =====
Round	1	2	3	4	5	6	7	8	9	10	11	12	13	14	15	16	17	18	19	20	21	22	23	24
Stadium	H	H	A	A	H	H	A	A	A	H	H	H	A	H	H	A	H	A	A	H	A	A	H	A
Result	D	W	L	D	W	D	W	L	D	D	W	W	L	D	W	L	L	W	L	L	W	D	L	W
Position (Note: SRFC's position at the end of the day in which their match was played.)	5	2	5	6	2	4	4	5	5	5	4	3	4	5	4	4	5	4	5	6	5	5	5	5

Updated to match(es) played on October 2, 2017. Source: NWSLsoccer.com
A = Away; H = Home; W = Win; D = Draw; L = Loss

== Appearances and goals ==
As of October 2, 2017

No.	Pos	Nat	Player	Total		Regular season		Playoffs	
No.	Pos	Nat	Player	Apps	Goals	Apps	Goals	Apps	Goals
Goalkeepers:
6	GK	(Australia) AUS	Lydia Williams	3	0	3	0	0	0
24	GK	(United States) USA	Madalyn Schiffel	1	0	1	0	0	0
28	GK	(United States) USA	Haley Kopmeyer	20	0	20	0	0	0
Defenders:
3	DF	(United States) USA	Lauren Barnes	22	0	21+1	0	0	0
4	DF	(Scotland) SCO	Rachel Corsie	14	0	12+2	0	0	0
7	DF	(United States) USA	Elli Reed	4	0	1+3	0	0	0
9	DF	(United States) USA	Merritt Mathias	21	2	18+3	2	0	0
13	DF	(New Zealand) NZL	Rebekah Stott	22	0	18+4	0	0	0
16	DF	(United States) USA	Carson Pickett	21	0	21	0	0	0
19	DF	(United States) USA	Kristen McNabb	18	1	14+4	1	0	0
26	DF	(United States) USA	Maddie Bauer	5	0	1+4	0	0	0
Midfielders:
2	MF	(United States) USA	Christine Nairn	23	1	21+2	1	0	0
8	MF	(Canada) CAN	Diana Matheson	0	0	0	0	0	0
10	MF	(Wales) WAL	Jess Fishlock	20	7	20	7	0	0
20	MF	(Japan) JPN	Rumi Utsugi	20	1	18+2	1	0	0
Forwards:
5	FW	(United States) USA	Kiersten Dallstream	14	1	3+11	1	0	0
15	FW	(United States) USA	Megan Rapinoe	18	12	17+1	12	0	0
17	FW	(United States) USA	Beverly Yanez	22	4	17+5	4	0	0
18	FW	(Australia) AUS	Larissa Crummer	4	1	0+4	1	0	0
33	FW	(Mexico) MEX	Katie Johnson	23	4	5+18	4	0	0
36	FW	(Japan) JPN	Nahomi Kawasumi	24	6	22+2	6	0	0
Players who left the club during the season:
6	MF	(United States) USA	Lindsay Elston	15	1	11+4	1	0	0
22	MF	(United States) USA	Michaela Hahn	0	0	0	0	0	0

== Awards ==
=== The 100 Best Footballers in The World ===
- No. 16: Megan Rapinoe
- No. 22: Jess Fishlock
- No. 45: Nahomi Kawasumi
- No. 56: Lydia Williams

=== NWSL season awards ===
- Most Valuable Player: Megan Rapinoe, finalist
- Best XI: Jess Fishlock
- Second XI: Megan Rapinoe

=== Team season awards ===
Reign FC team season awards are voted on by the players, coaches, and technical staff at the club.

- Golden Boot: Megan Rapinoe (12)
- Most Valuable Player: Rumi Utsugi
- Unsung Hero: Elli Reed
- Offensive Player of the Year: Megan Rapinoe
- Defensive Player of the Year: Rebekah Stott
- Best Social Media Game: Haley Kopmeyer and Katie Johnson

=== Fan season awards ===
- Game of the Year: vs. Sky Blue FC, July 22.
- Goal of the Year: Jess Fishlock at Portland Thorns FC, May 6.
- Save of the Year: Haley Kopmeyer vs. Sky Blue FC, July 22.

=== NWSL Player of the Month ===
- July: Megan Rapinoe

=== NWSL Team of the Month ===
- April: Jess Fishlock
- May: Nahomi Kawasumi
- June: Jess Fishlock and Megan Rapinoe
- July: Megan Rapinoe

=== NWSL Player of the Week ===
- Week 1: Haley Kopmeyer (8SV, 1GA vs. Sky Blue FC)
- Week 2: Jess Fishlock (1G, 1A vs. Houston Dash)
- Week 5: Nahomi Kawasumi (1G, 4A vs. Washington Spirit)
- Week 11: Megan Rapinoe (4G in two games)
- Week 14: Megan Rapinoe (3G vs. Sky Blue FC)
- Week 22: Jess Fishlock (2G, 1A vs. Washington Spirit)

=== NWSL Goal of the Week ===
- Week 4: Jess Fishlock at Portland Thorns FC
- Week 14: Megan Rapinoe vs. Sky Blue FC

== Contract extensions ==
Date	Player	Pos	Notes	Ref
October 19, 2016	(United States) Haley Kopmeyer	GK	Club options exercised	
October 19, 2016	(United States) Andi Tostanoski	GK	Club options exercised	
October 19, 2016	(United States) Lauren Barnes	DF	Club options exercised	
October 19, 2016	(United States) Kendall Fletcher	DF	Club options exercised	
October 19, 2016	(United States) Carson Pickett	DF	Club options exercised	
October 19, 2016	(Japan) Rumi Utsugi	DF	Club options exercised	
October 19, 2016	(United States) Elli Reed	DF	Club options exercised	
October 19, 2016	(Wales) Jess Fishlock	MF	Club options exercised	
October 19, 2016	(United States) Lindsay Elston	MF	Club options exercised	
October 19, 2016	(Japan) Nahomi Kawasumi	FW	Club options exercised	
October 19, 2016	(Netherlands) Manon Melis	FW	Club options exercised	
November 21, 2016	(United States) Beverly Yanez	FW	Re-signed	
December 8, 2016	(Scotland) Rachel Corsie	DF	Re-signed	
January 18, 2017	(United States) Merritt Mathias	DF	Re-signed	
January 19, 2017	(United States) Kiersten Dallstream	FW	Re-signed	
February 15, 2017	(United States) Haley Kopmeyer	GK	Signed to a new contract through 2018	

== Transfers ==
For transfers in, dates listed are when the Reign FC officially signed the players to the roster. Transactions where only the rights to the players are acquired (e.g., draft picks) are not listed, and amateur call-ups are not considered official signings either. For transfers out, dates listed are when the Reign FC officially removed the players from its roster, not when they signed with another club. If a player later signed with another club, her new club will be noted, but the date listed here remains the one when she was officially removed from the Reign FC roster.

=== In ===
Date	Player	Pos	Previous club	Notes	Ref
November 10, 2016	(United States) Christine Nairn	MF	(United States) Washington Spirit	Traded, along with rights to Madalyn Schiffel, for rights to Havana Solaun and three draft picks	
January 5, 2017	(United States) Madalyn Schiffel	GK	(Norway) Avaldsnes IL	Free; rights previously acquired from Washington Spirit	
January 17, 2017	(New Zealand) Rebekah Stott	DF	(Australia) Melbourne City	Free	
January 23, 2017	(Canada) Diana Matheson	MF	(United States) Washington Spirit	Traded for rights to Arielle Ship and a third-round draft pick in 2018	
January 26, 2017	(Australia) Larissa Crummer	FW	(Australia) Melbourne City	Free	
March 31, 2017	(Mexico) Katie Johnson	FW	(United States) USC Trojans	Draft pick	
April 3, 2017	(United States) Kristen McNabb	MF	(United States) Virginia Cavaliers	Draft pick	
April 10, 2017	(United States) Maddie Bauer	DF	(United States) Stanford Cardinal	Draft pick	
April 11, 2017	(United States) Michaela Hahn	MF	(United States) North Carolina Courage	Claimed off waivers	
August 31, 2017	(Australia) Lydia Williams	GK	(United States) Houston Dash	Traded for a second-round draft pick in 2018	

==== Draft picks ====
Draft picks are not automatically signed to the team roster. Only those who are signed to a contract will be listed as transfers in. Only trades involving draft picks and executed during the 2017 NWSL College Draft will be listed in the notes.

Player	Pos	Previous club	Notes	Ref
(United States) Maddie Bauer	DF	(United States) Stanford Cardinal	Round 1, Pick 6 (6th overall)	
(Mexico) Katie Johnson	FW	(United States) USC Trojans	Round 2, Pick 6 (16th overall); pick acquired from Chicago in exchange for the club's 1st round pick in 2018	
(United States) Arielle Ship	FW	(United States) California Golden Bears	Round 3, Pick 6 (26th overall)	
(United States) Kristen McNabb	DF	(United States) Virginia Cavaliers	Round 4, Pick 7 (37th overall)	

=== Out ===
Date	Player	Pos	Destination Club	Notes	Ref
September 10, 2016	(United States) Keelin Winters	MF		Retired	
October 17, 2016	(Scotland) Kim Little	MF	(England) Arsenal	Transfer	
October 19, 2016	(United States) Michelle Cruz	DF		Waived	
November 7, 2016	(Netherlands) Manon Melis	FW		Retired	
November 10, 2016	(United States) Havana Solaun	MF	(United States) Washington Spirit	Traded, along with three draft picks, for rights to Christine Nairn and Madalyn Schiffel	
December 16, 2016	(United States) Andi Tostanoski	GK		Waived	
January 16, 2017	(United States) Kendall Fletcher	DF	(Australia) Sydney Uni SFC	Departed for postgraduate study	
July 18, 2017	(United States) Michaela Hahn	MF	(Cyprus) Apollon Ladies FC	Waived	
August 31, 2017	(United States) Lindsay Elston	MF		Elected to not finish the season; retired	

=== Offseason loans ===
- Lauren Barnes, Melbourne City
- Larissa Crummer, Melbourne City
- Jess Fishlock, Melbourne City
- Haley Kopmeyer, Canberra United
- Kristen McNabb, Melbourne Victory
- Carson Pickett, Brisbane Roar
- Rebekah Stott, Melbourne City
- Lydia Williams, Melbourne City
