= Merritt Mathias =

American soccer player (born 1990)

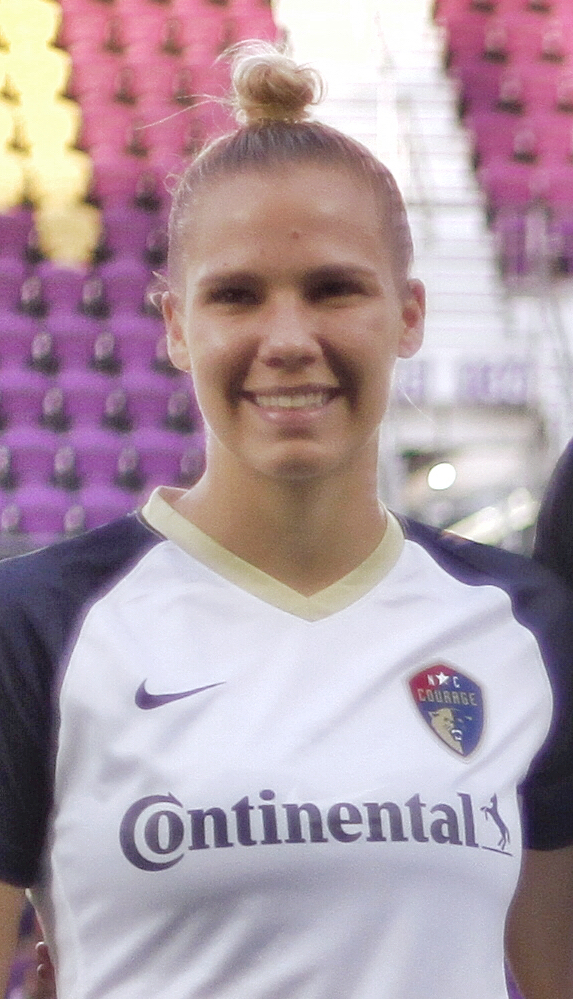
- Mathias with the North Carolina Courage in 2018

Personal information
- Full name: Merritt Elizabeth Mathias
- Date of birth: July 2, 1990 (age 36)
- Place of birth: Birmingham, Alabama, United States
- Height: 5 ft 6 in (1.68 m)
- Position: Right back

College career
Years	Team	Apps	(Gls)
2008–2009	North Carolina Tar Heels	39	(3)
2010–2011	Texas A&M Aggies	44	(17)

Senior career*
Years	Team	Apps	(Gls)
2012	New York Fury		
2013–2014	FC Kansas City	42	(2)
2015–2017	Seattle Reign FC	60	(2)
2018–2022	North Carolina Courage	86	(3)
2023–2024	Angel City FC	13	(0)

International career
2006–2007	United States U-17		
2011	United States U-23		
2018	United States	1	(0)
- * Club domestic league appearances and goals as of August 20, 2024

Merritt Elizabeth Mathias (born July 2, 1990) is an American former professional soccer player who most recently played as a right back for Angel City FC of the National Women's Soccer League (NWSL). She has won three NWSL Shields and three NWSL Championships during her twelve seasons in the NWSL: one Championship with FC Kansas City, one Shield with Seattle Reign FC, and two doubles with the North Carolina Courage. She played extensively with the youth national team and earned one cap with the United States senior team in 2018.

== Early life ==
Born in Birmingham, Alabama, Mathias attended and played for Oak Mountain High School in Birmingham. Mathias was one of the top-ranked recruits in the nation according to Soccer Buzz Magazine. She was a Parade Magazine high school All-America selection in 2007 and the 2006 and 2007 National High School Coaches Association All-America.

== College career ==
Mathias attended the University of North Carolina at Chapel Hill where she played for the Tar Heels for two seasons in 2008 and 2009 before transferring to Texas A&M University where she majored in Agriculture leadership and development. During her first season with the Aggies, she started in 20 matches and scored nine goals – third best on the team. She was named to the All-Big 12 first team and the Big 12 All-Newcomer team. She was also a two-time Big 12 Player of the week. During her senior year, she started in all 24 matches and scored eight goals, including three game-winners. She ranked second on the team in assists with 11 and led the Big 12 Conference in all games with 93 shots on the season while ranking second in shots per game at 3.88. She ranked third in assists at eleven and third in assists per game at 0.46. Mathias ranked second in Top Drawer Soccer's Big 12 Top 20 Player Rankings and was named to the All-Big 12 First Team as well as the Big 12 All-Tournament Team. Mathias ended the season ranked at number 17 nationally in total assists was number 35 for assists per game.

== Club career ==
=== New York Fury, 2012 ===
Following the folding of the WPS, Mathias signed on to play with the New York Fury of the WPSL Elite.

=== FC Kansas City, 2013–2014 ===
Prior to the start of the National Women's Soccer League's inaugural season, Mathias was selected 22nd overall in the 2013 NWSL Supplemental Draft by FC Kansas City. During the 2013 season, Mathias started in 20 of the 23 matches in which she played. She scored two goals: one against the Portland Thorns on June 30 resulting in a 2–0 win for Kansas City and the second in the ninetieth minute against Boston Breakers on July 24. Kansas City finished the regular season in second place with an 11–6–5 record and advanced to the playoffs. They were eliminated in the semi-finals after being defeated 3–2 by Portland in overtime.

During the 2014 season, Mathias helped FC Kansas City finish second in the regular season standings with a 16–6–2 record and ultimately win the league championship after defeating first place Seattle Reign FC 2–1. Mathias started in 18 of the 22 matches in which she played.

=== Seattle Reign FC, 2015–2017 ===
In November 2014, Mathias was traded to Seattle Reign FC in exchange for Kate Deines and two 2015 draft picks. During the 2015 season, Mathias started in 19 of the team's 20 regular season games and recorded 1,480 minutes on the pitch. During a match against the Washington Spirit on May 2, she scored the game-winning goal in the 48th minute helping the Reign win 3–1. During a match against the Houston Dash on August 12, she scored an equalizer in the 22nd minute. The Reign defeated the Dash 2–1 and earned a berth to the playoffs. Mathias served two assists throughout the season. The Reign finished the regular season in first place clinching the NWSL Shield for the second consecutive time. After advancing to the playoffs, Seattle faced fourth-place team Washington Spirit and won 3–0, advancing to the championship final. Seattle was ultimately defeated 1–0 by FC Kansas City during the championship final in Portland.

During the 2016 season, Mathias made 17 starts in her 19 appearances for the club. She scored the club's lone goal (a header goal) during a 2–1 loss to Sky Blue FC in April 2017, the club's first loss at home in 24 games. During the first few months of the season, a number of offensive players became unavailable due to injury including Manon Melis, Jess Fishlock and Megan Rapinoe. Seattle finished the regular season in fifth place with a 8–6–8 record, narrowly missing a playoff spot by two points.

Returning to the club for the 2017 season, Mathias scored a goal in the 39th minute in a match against the Portland Thorns FC. After the match, she was fined and suspended three matches for an incident with Emily Sonnett.

=== North Carolina Courage, 2018–2022 ===
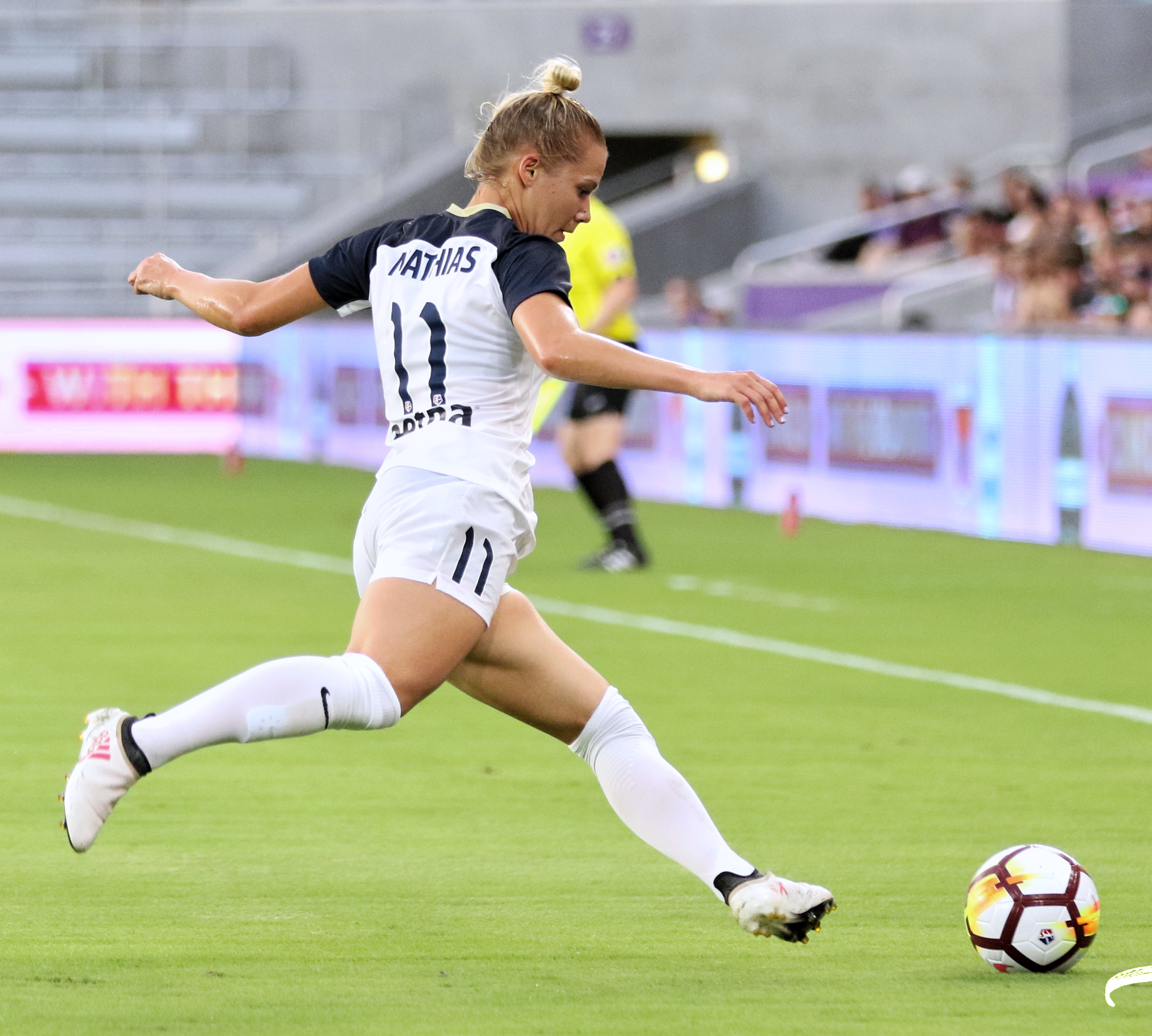
Mathias playing for the Courage in 2018

Mathias was traded to North Carolina Courage in January 2018. She appeared in 22 regular season games for the Courage, scoring 3 goals. Mathias was an important part of the backline that broke the record for fewest goals conceded, and won the NWSL Shield. She was named to the 2018 NWSL Second XI. In the 2018 play-offs, Mathias was in the starting lineup for the semi-final and final. She recorded an assist in the Championship game as the Courage won the 2018 NWSL Championship.

=== Angel City FC, 2023–2024 ===
In January 2023, Mathias was traded to Angel City FC in exchange for forward Tyler Lussi. Despite being sidelined during the entire 2023 season due to injury, Angel City announced on November 15, 2023, they would exercise their one-year option and extend her contract through the end of 2024. Mathias made her long-awaited debut for Angel City on March 17, 2024, coming on a substitute in the home opener against Bay FC.

Mathias announced on October 15, 2024, that she would retire at the end of the season.

== International career ==
Mathias had extensive experience at the youth national team levels having played on the U-15, U-16, U-17, and U-23 teams. In October 2016, Mathias was called up to camp for the United States women's national soccer team. She received her first cap for United States women's national soccer team on June 12, 2018, in a friendly against China PR in Cleveland. Mathias came in as a substitute replacing Sofia Huerta in the 77th minute.

She was named to the U.S. Roster for the 2018 Tournament of Nations, but she didn't appear in any games. The U.S. won the tournament. Mathias was on the provisional 35-player roster for the 2018 CONCACAF Women's Championship but wasn't named to the final 20-player roster, however she would still join the squad to train and help in preparations.

== Personal life ==
Mathias is a part of the LGBTQ+ community.

== Honors ==
FC Kansas City

- NWSL Champions: 2014

Seattle Reign

- NWSL Shield: 2015

North Carolina Courage

- NWSL Champions: 2018, 2019
- NWSL Shield: 2018, 2019

United States

- Tournament of Nations: 2018

Individual

- NWSL Second XI: 2018

== See also ==
- List of Seattle Reign FC players
- List of sportswomen
