= Havana Solaun =

Jamaican footballer (born 1993)

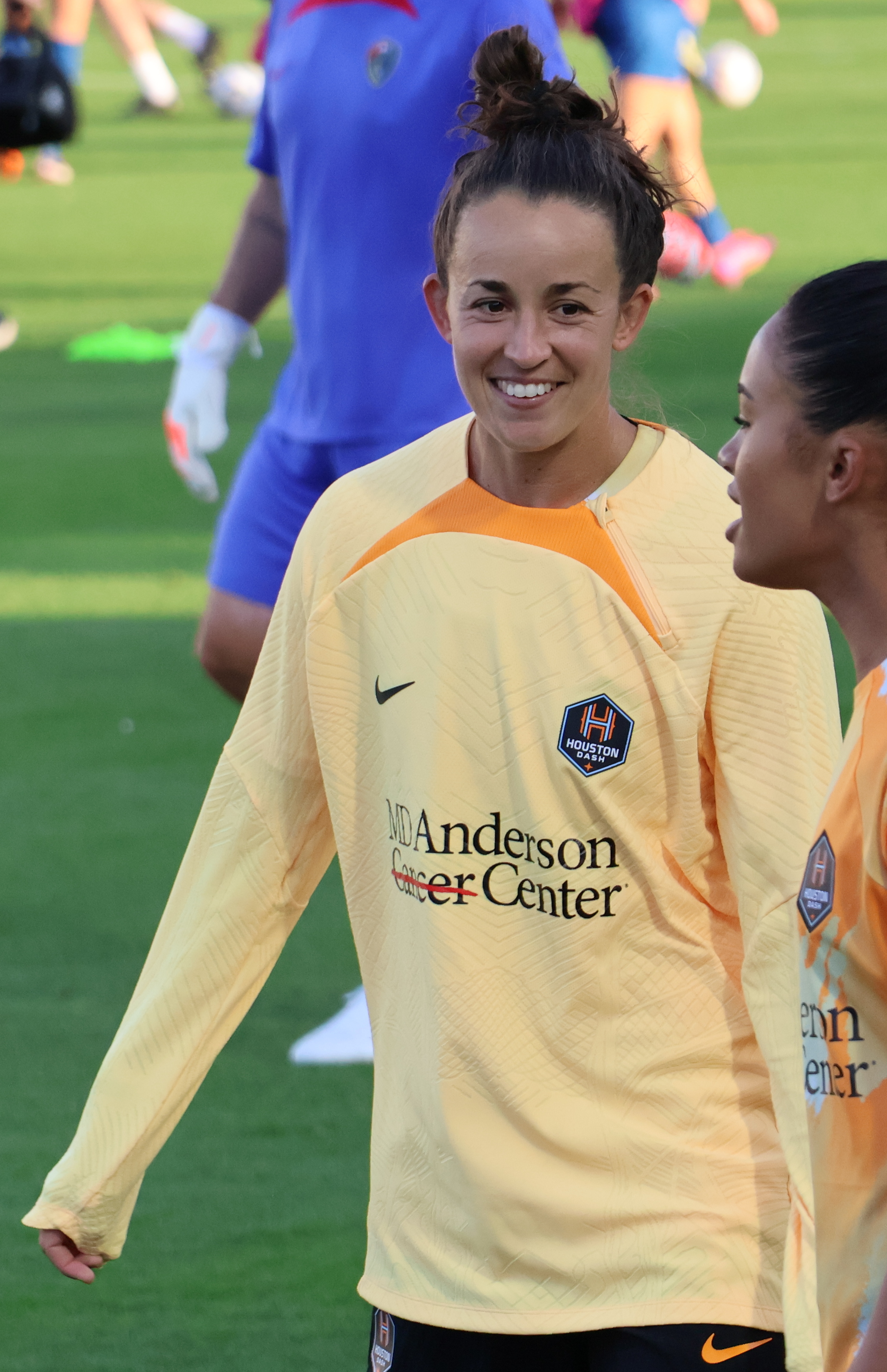
- Solaun with the Houston Dash in 2024

Personal information
- Full name: Havana Marguerite Solaun
- Date of birth: 23 February 1993 (age 33)
- Place of birth: Gainesville, Florida, United States
- Height: 1.75 m (5 ft 9 in)
- Position: Midfielder

College career
Years	Team	Apps	(Gls)
2011–2014	Florida Gators	90	(30)

Senior career*
Years	Team	Apps	(Gls)
2015–2016	Seattle Reign FC	4	(1)
2017–2018	Washington Spirit	37	(5)
2019	Klepp IL	20	(10)
2020	Paris FC	0	(0)
2020	Apollon Ladies	0	(0)
2020–2022	North Carolina Courage	22	(1)
2023–2024	Houston Dash	14	(1)

International career^{‡}
2009–2010	United States U17	5	(3)
2014–2016	United States U23	5	(0)
2019–2023	Jamaica	17	(2)
Medal record
Representing Jamaica
CONCACAF W Championship
Third place	2022 Mexico
- * Club domestic league appearances and goals as of 02:29, September 16, 2024 (UTC) ‡ National team caps and goals as of 21:32, 22 November 2026 (UTC)

Havana Marguerite Solaun (born 23 February 1993) is a former professional footballer. Born in the United States, she played for the Jamaica national team. Solaun began her professional career with the NWSL's Seattle Reign FC in 2015. After two years, she was traded to the Washington Spirit. Solaun is a former United States youth international, most recently at the U23 level.

== Early life ==
Solaun's family moved back to the United States when she was two. She attended Buchholz High School in Gainesville, Florida. From 2008 to 2010, she was named to the All-Area Girls Soccer first-team by The Gainesville Sun.

== College career ==
Solaun attended the University of Florida from 2011 to 2014 where she played soccer for the Florida Gators and was a four-year starting midfielder. Solaun earned All-Southeastern Conference first team honors in 2014 and 2013 and also appeared on the NSCAA All-South Region teams those same seasons. As a senior in 2014, Solaun registered collegiate best totals for goals(9), assists (9) and points (27) to finish second among the Gators in each category.

== Club career ==
Solaun was selected 15th overall by Seattle Reign FC during the 2015 NWSL College Draft. Solaun made her debut for the Reign during 2–0 win over the University of Washington during preseason play but sat out the season after suffering an injury. During the team's first 2016 pre-season match against the Portland Thorns, Solaun scored the game-winning goal in the 75th minute helping the Reign win 2–0. She made her debut for the club during its season opener against Sky Blue FC on April 17. She scored her first goal during a match against the Houston Dash leading the Reign to a 1–0 win.

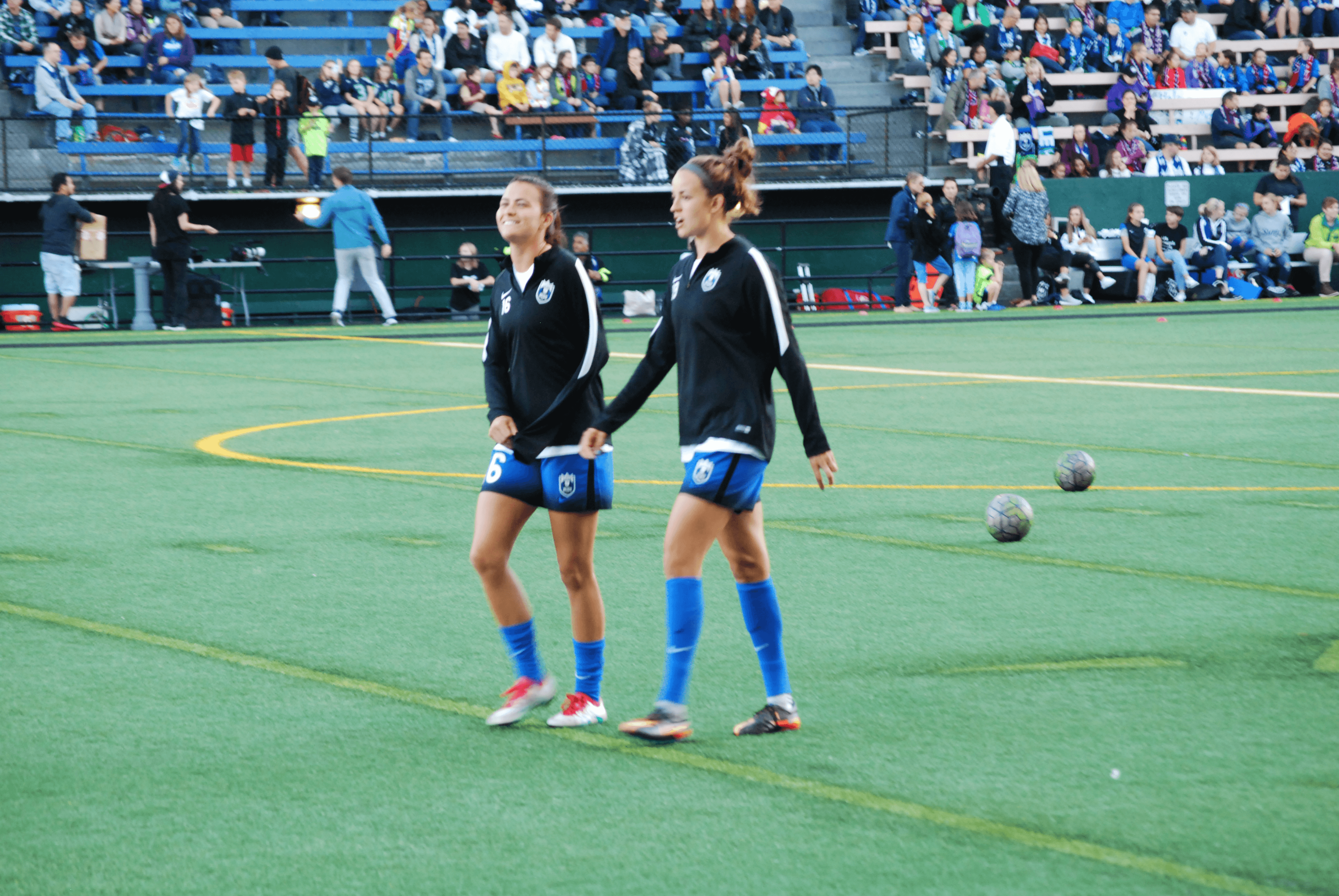
Solaun (right) with Reign FC teammate, Carson Pickett, 2016.

Solaun's player rights were traded to the Washington Spirit in November 2016 in exchange for Spirit players Christine Nairn and Madalyn Schiffel. She signed with the team in December. Solaun would become a regular starter for the Spirit, earning 24 appearances and scoring 5 goals during her first season.

Despite a new contract offer from Washington Spirit, Solaun elected to join Norwegian club Klepp IL on a free transfer for 2019.

On January 12, D1 Féminine team Paris FC announced they had signed Solaun.

Unable to appear for Paris FC due to the coronavirus pandemic, Solaun signed for Cypriot club Apollon Ladies for their UEFA Women's Champions League campaign.

Solaun signed a short-term contract to play for North Carolina Courage during the 2020 NWSL Fall Series. In January 2021, she signed a one-year contract with a one-year option for the team. In September 2022, the club bought out the remainder of her contract and released her to free agency.

In January 2023, Solaun joined Houston Dash on a two-year contract.

== International career ==
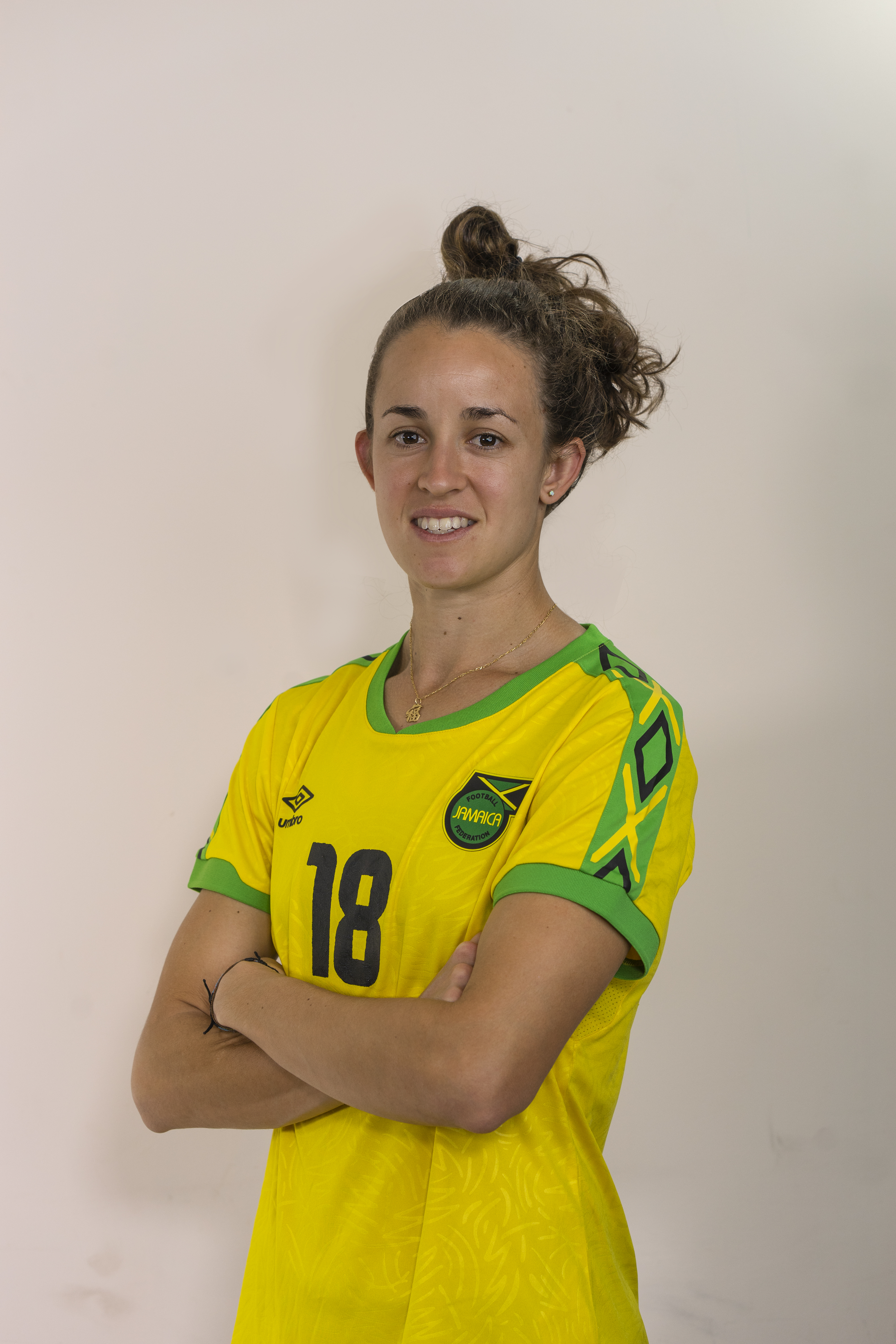
Solaun in 2019

Solaun was born in Gainesville, Florida to an Afro-Cuban father (Felix Solaun, born in the United States shortly after his parents Félix Solaun and Hilda Luis moved from their native Havana) and a Jamaican mother (Sandra Brower, formerly Solaun, née Phillips), Solaun was originally eligible to play for the national teams of the United States, Cuba or Jamaica.

=== Youth national teams ===
Solaun represented the United States on the under-17 (2010 CONCACAF Women's U-17 Championship), under-20 and under-23 national teams. As Solaun had previously lived in Canada (also in Singapore), she participated in a centralized camp of the Canadian national team in February 2015.

=== Jamaica senior national team ===
Following the historic FIFA Women's World Cup qualification by the Jamaica women's national football team, Solaun was named to its training camp roster in January 2019. She made her debut on March 3 that year in a 3–2 friendly win against Chile.

On June 18, 2019, Solaun scored Jamaica's first-ever goal in a FIFA Women's World Cup shortly after coming on as a second-half substitute against Australia.

=== International goals ===
Scores and results list Jamaica's goal tally first

No.	Date	Venue	Opponent	Score	Result	Competition
1	18 June 2019	Stade des Alpes, Grenoble, France	Australia	1–2	1–4	2019 FIFA Women's World Cup
2	4 February 2020	H-E-B Park, Edinburg, United States	Saint Kitts and Nevis	3–0	7–0	2020 CONCACAF Women's Olympic Qualifying Championship

== Personal life ==
Solaun's first name, Havana, is a tribute to her paternal grandparents' birthplace.

== See also ==
- List of University of Florida alumni
