= Jaycie Ackerman =

American soccer player

Jaycie Johnson
Personal information
- Birth name: Joelle Catherine Johnson
- Date of birth: April 18, 1995 (age 31)
- Place of birth: Lake Winnebago, Missouri, United States
- Height: 5 ft 6 in (1.68 m)
- Position: Forward

Team information
- Current team: Iowa State Cyclones (assistant)

Youth career
- Sporting Blue Valley SC

College career
Years	Team	Apps	(Gls)
2013–2016	Nebraska Cornhuskers	73	(42)

Senior career*
Years	Team	Apps	(Gls)
2018–2019	Reign FC	4	(0)
2021–2022	Kansas City Current	7	(0)

International career
2015–2018	United States U23		

Managerial career
- 2023: Kansas Jayhawks (assistant)
- 2024: Kansas State Wildcats (assistant)
- 2025–: Iowa State Cyclones (assistant)
- * Club domestic league appearances and goals as of 06:24, March 4, 2026 (UTC)

Joelle Catherine "Jaycie" Ackerman (née Johnson; born April 18, 1995) is an American soccer coach and former player who is an assistant coach for the Iowa State Cyclones. A forward in her playing career, Johnson played college soccer for the Nebraska Cornhuskers before spending professional stints for Reign FC and the Kansas City Current of the National Women's Soccer League.

== Youth career ==
A Lake Winnebago, Missouri native, Johnson enjoyed a prolific youth career with Lee's Summit West High School and Sporting Blue Valley Soccer Club, previously known as Kansas City Football Club until a merger. She scored 195 goals for Lee's Summit West, earning all-state honors all four years, as well as 2012 NSCAA All-America and 2013 Gatorade Missouri Girls Soccer Player of the Year awards.

== College career ==
A four-star recruit and rated the No. 148 player in the country, Johnson committed to the Nebraska Cornhuskers. She had a record-breaking freshman year in 2013, leading the team in goals (17) en route to Soccer America All-Freshman Team honors. In Nebraska's NCAA first-round match, Johnson became the first freshman and only the fifth player in history to score four goals in an NCAA tournament match.

Johnson followed up her freshman season with 11 goals in 2014 and 3 goals in 9 matches before tearing her ACL on September 25, 2015. Coming back from her season-ending injury, she again scored 11 goals in 2016, ending her college career with her first NSCAA All-America (third-team) honors as a senior.

== Club career ==
North Carolina Courage selected Johnson in the third round of the 2017 NWSL College Draft, but she suffered a knee injury and missed the entire 2017 NWSL season.

Ahead of the 2018 NWSL season, Reign FC invited Johnson to its preseason camp as a trialist, and she made the team as a National Team Replacement player on March 30. She subsequently made the first-team roster on July 10, after a long spell on the disabled list.

Johnson remained with Reign FC in 2019 as a supplemental player, but she was moved to the season-ending injury list on June 28, 2019. The club declined to pick up her contract options for 2020 at the end of the season.

In December 2020, Johnson signed with Kansas City. Johnson was waived by Kansas City in November 2022.

== International career ==
Johnson was a member of the United States U23 team in 2015.

== Coaching career ==
Johnson was named assistant coach for the University of Kansas Women's soccer team in July 2023. The following year, she served the same position for the Kansas State Wildcats. On June 16, 2025, Johnson made her third assistant coaching move in three years, joining the Iowa State Cyclones.
