= Madalyn Schiffel =

American soccer player

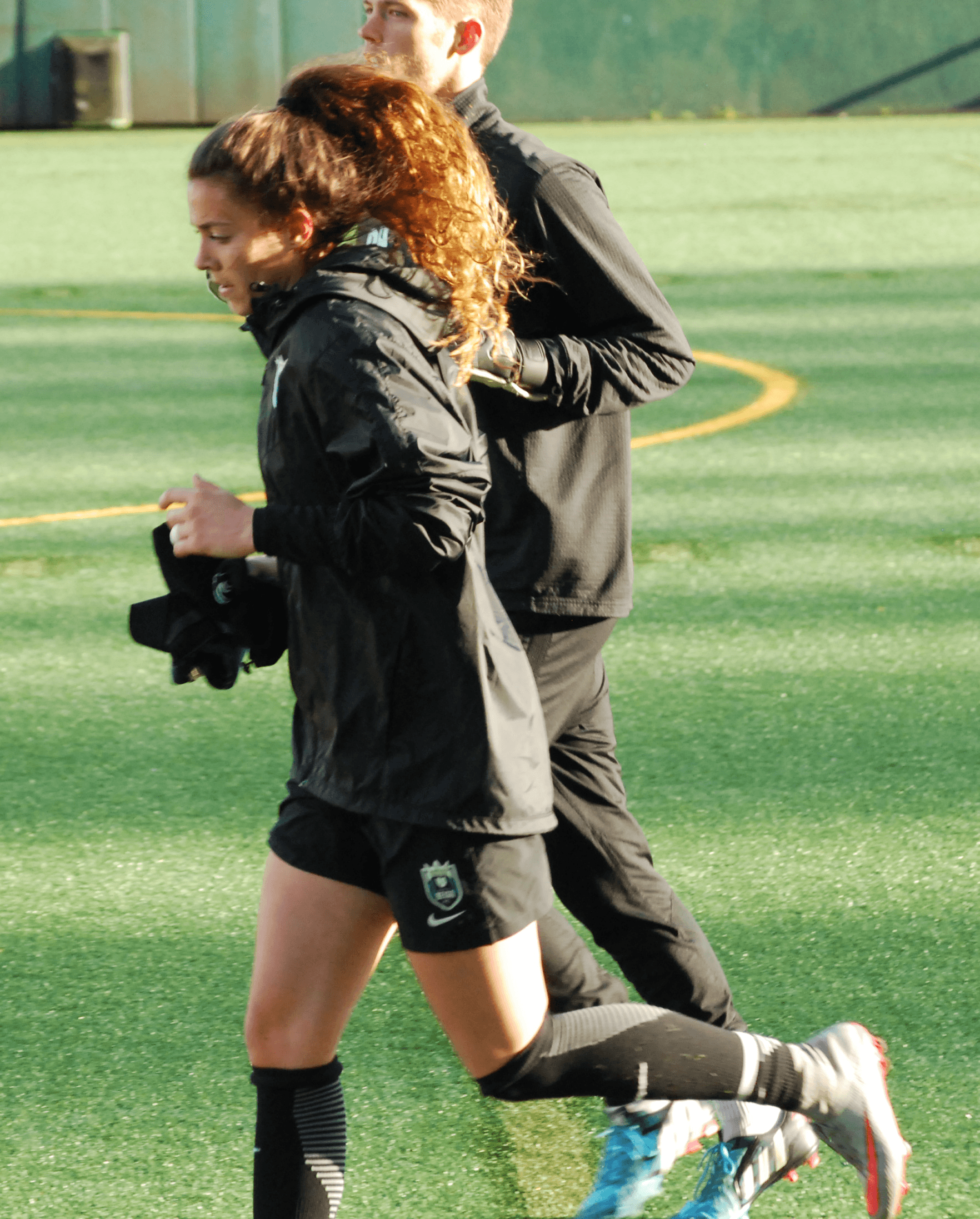
- Schiffel, April 2017

Personal information
- Full name: Madalyn Terese Schiffel
- Date of birth: September 19, 1994 (age 31)
- Place of birth: Roseville, California
- Height: 5 ft 9 in (1.75 m)
- Position: Goalkeeper

College career
Years	Team	Apps	(Gls)
2012–2015	San Francisco Dons	70	(0)

Senior career*
Years	Team	Apps	(Gls)
2016	Avaldsnes IL	22	(0)
2017	Seattle Reign FC	1	(0)

International career
2015–2017	United States U23		
- * Club domestic league appearances and goals

Madalyn Terese Schiffel (born September 19, 1994) is a retired American professional soccer goalkeeper who previously played Seattle Reign FC in the National Women's Soccer League (NWSL) and for Avaldsnes IL of the Norwegian Toppserien.

== Early life and education ==
Schiffel was born on September 19, 1994, in Roseville, California. She attended Cornerstone Christian School. She played club soccer for Placer United, winning the 2010 Nor Cal Cup and Placer Cup Championships.

=== San Francisco Dons, 2012–2015 ===
Schiffel attended the University of San Francisco and played for the Dons in the West Coast Conference (WCC). As a freshman, she started 10 games, leading her team to four wins, and posting a save percentage of .838 (second in the WCC). Her season was cut short due to an injury in late September. In 2013, Schiffel played every minute in goal for USF and was named an All-West Coast Conference Team honorable mention. As a Junior, she played in all 20 games, recording five solo shutouts and earning herself a name on the All-WCC Second Team. In her senior year, Schiffel was named to the preseason All-WCC team and earned first-team NSCAA All-West Region honors. She graduated with a career record in goalkeeper wins (29), shutouts (23) and minutes played in goal (6,514).

== Club career ==
=== Avaldsnes IL, 2016 ===
After Schiffel was selected 34th overall by the Washington Spirit in the NWSL College Draft in January 2016, she signed with Norwegian club Avaldsnes IL. Avaldsnes' American goalkeeper coach Carl Gregor said that although Schiffel faced tough competition from the other two goalkeepers at the club, she had everything it takes to become a top-level goalkeeper. She started the 2016 Toppserien season as first choice. In May 2016, Schiffel was player of the match in a 0–0 draw with defending champions LSK Kvinner FK. She was praised by coach Colin Bell as it was the first time Avaldsnes had avoided defeat by rivals LSK.

=== Seattle Reign FC, 2017 ===
In January 2017, Seattle Reign FC signed Schiffel ahead of the 2017 season. The team had previously acquired her player rights from Washington Spirit in November 2016 as part of a trade that included Christine Nairn and Havana Solaun. On October 23, 2017, Schiffel announced her retirement from Seattle Reign FC.

=== International ===
Schiffel has represented the United States on the under-20 and under-23 national teams.
