= Carson Pickett =

American soccer player (born 1993)

- Pickett with Racing Louisville in 2024

Personal information
- Full name: Carson Leighann Pickett
- Date of birth: September 15, 1993 (age 33)
- Place of birth: Spartanburg, South Carolina, U.S.
- Height: 5 ft 8 in (1.73 m)
- Position: Left back

Team information
- Current team: Denver Summit
- Number: 16

College career
Years	Team	Apps	(Gls)
2012–2015	Florida State Seminoles	103	(7)

Senior career*
Years	Team	Apps	(Gls)
2016–2017	Seattle Reign	36	(0)
2017–2020	→ Brisbane Roar (loan)	35	(6)
2018–2020	Orlando Pride	39	(0)
2020	→ Apollon Ladies (loan)	0	(0)
2021–2022	North Carolina Courage	44	(1)
2023–2024	Racing Louisville	36	(1)
2024–2025	Orlando Pride	29	(4)
2026–	Denver Summit	14	(0)

International career^{‡}
2010	United States U-17		
2015	United States U-23		
2022–	United States	2	(0)
- * Club domestic league appearances and goals as of November 1, 2026 ‡ National team caps and goals as of October 11, 2022

Carson Leighann Pickett (born September 15, 1993) is an American professional soccer player who plays as a left back for Denver Summit FC of the National Women's Soccer League (NWSL). She is an advocate for limb difference awareness and was born without a left forearm and hand.

Pickett played college soccer for the Florida State Seminoles before being drafted by Seattle Reign FC in 2016. She received NWSL Best XI honors twice while playing for the North Carolina Courage in 2021 and 2022. Pickett has also played for the NWSL's Racing Louisville FC and the Australian club Brisbane Roar FC. She made two appearances for the United States national team in 2022, becoming the first player with a limb disability to play for the team.

== Early life ==
Raised in Fleming Island on the northeastern coast of Florida near Jacksonville, Pickett attended St. Johns Country Day School and won 3 state championships with the soccer team. In 2012, she was named Gatorade Girls Soccer Player of the Year for the state of Florida, and 2012, Florida Times-Union First Coast Player of the Year. Pickett was born without a left forearm and hand, a fact many reporters have highlighted throughout her career. Her condition was the subject of a viral Instagram photo during the 2019 season. The photo showed her "fist-bumping" a 2-year-old boy who was also born without a left forearm and hand, with both using their left arms to do so.

== College career ==
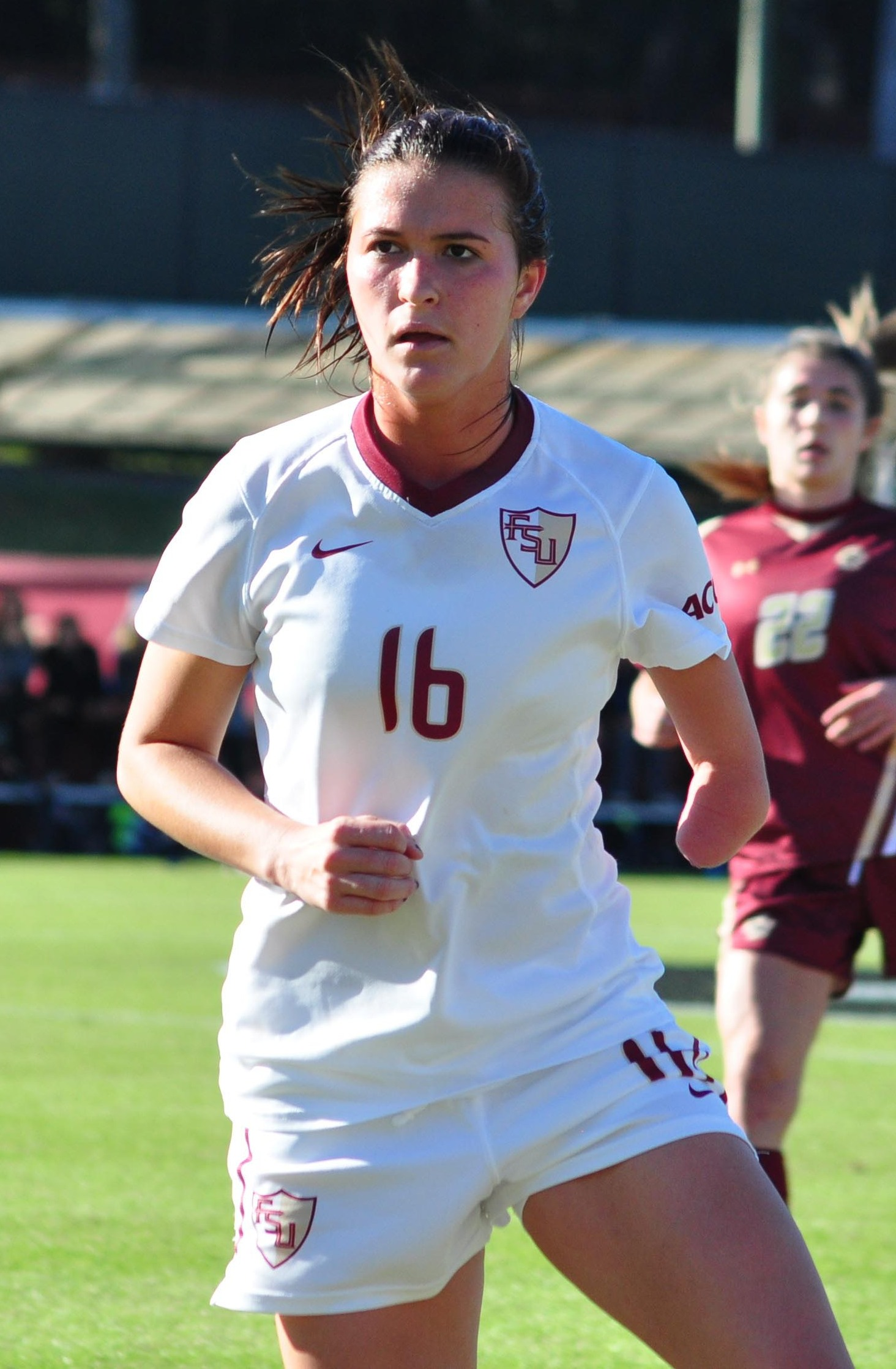
Pickett with the Seminoles in 2013

Pickett attended Florida State University from 2012 to 2015, where she played soccer for the Florida State Seminoles and was a four-year starting defender. In 2014, she led the Seminoles to their first NCAA Division I Women's Soccer Championship anchoring a defense that allowed no goals throughout the tournament.

== Club career ==
=== Seattle Reign FC ===
Pickett was selected by Seattle Reign FC as the fourth overall pick of the 2016 NWSL College Draft. Of the selection, Reign FC head coach Laura Harvey said, "Pickett is a player that we have been tracking closely for a long time. We were hoping she would still be available with our pick in the first round, so the choice to select her was an easy one. We think she will be a valuable addition to our squad during the upcoming season." She made her debut for the club during its season opener against Sky Blue FC on April 17.

==== Loans to Brisbane Roar ====
In October 2017, Pickett was loaned to Brisbane Roar for the 2017–18 W-League. She scored her first professional goal on November 10, 2017, in the Roar's 1–0 win over Western Sydney Wanderers.

She returned for second and third loan spells during the 2018–19 W-League and 2019–20 W-League seasons. On February 23, 2020, Pickett had her first career multi-goal game when she scored twice in a 5–0 win over Canberra United. Pickett was named as the team's player of the year for the 2019–20 season.

=== Orlando Pride ===
In January 2018, Pickett and Christine Nairn were acquired by the Orlando Pride in a trade that sent Steph Catley to Seattle. Pickett played in nineteen of twenty-four matches (including sixteen starts) for an Orlando side that finished seventh in the league.

In March 2020, the impending NWSL season was postponed due to the coronavirus pandemic. An eventual restart was made through a smaller schedule 2020 NWSL Challenge Cup tournament. However, on June 22, Orlando withdrew from the tournament following positive COVID-19 tests among both players and staff.

==== Loan to Apollon Ladies ====
In August, having been unable to feature for Orlando Pride, Pickett moved to Cypriot First Division club Apollon Ladies on loan until November. She never made an appearance for the team.

=== North Carolina Courage ===
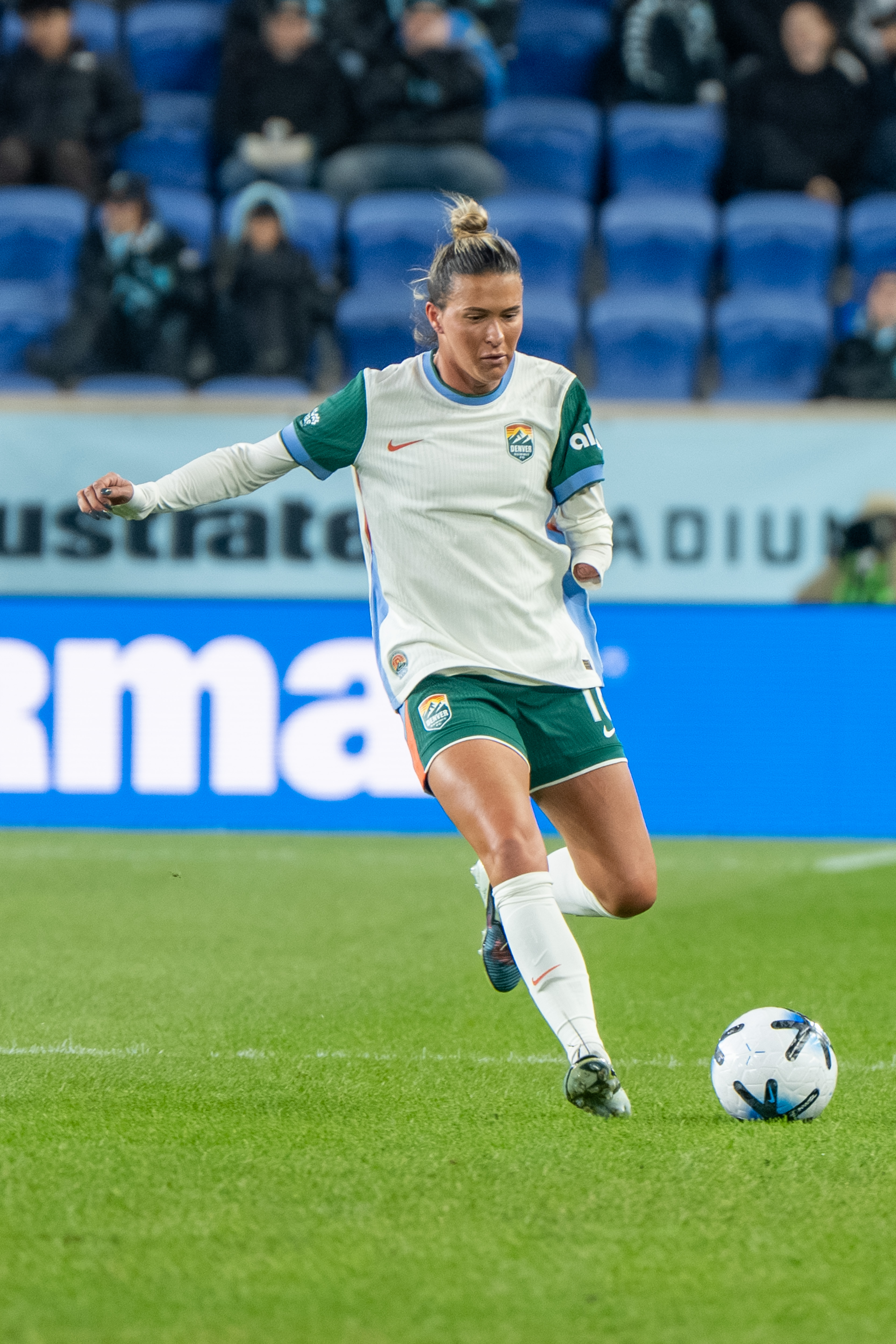
Carson Pickett with the Denver Summit in 2026

On February 4, 2021, North Carolina Courage acquired Pickett in a trade with Orlando in exchange for the playing rights to Jodie Taylor. Over her two years with North Carolina, Pickett contributed 11 assists, including an NWSL-leading six in 2022. She was twice named to the NWSL Best XI and nominated for NWSL Defender of the Year during her time at North Carolina.

=== Racing Louisville ===
In January 2023, Racing Louisville FC acquired Pickett and fellow North Carolina Courage defender Abby Erceg in exchange for Emily Fox. Pickett signed a three-year contract with Racing through the 2025 season.

=== Orlando Pride ===
Pickett returned to the Orlando Pride on August 16, 2024, in a trade for $75,000 in allocation funds to Louisville.

On December 1, 2025, it was announced that Pickett would be departing the club as a free agent.

=== Denver Summit ===
On December 22, 2025, NWSL expansion club Denver Summit FC signed Pickett to a two-year contract ahead of the team's inaugural season of play.

== International ==
Pickett has represented the United States on the under-17 and under-23 national teams.

On June 28, 2022, she made her debut for the United States national team against Colombia, becoming the first player with a limb difference to play for the USWNT.

== Advocacy ==
In recent years, Pickett has become a significant advocate for limb difference awareness. In a 2020 interview for CBSSports.com, Pickett said,

Ever since I got to the pros and seeing how many amazing messages I get sent about how I inspire people, some who aren't even soccer players... [Seeing that] just showed me that I can do so much more than just be a good soccer player, and that I could advocate for something much bigger than soccer.

She worked with Nike to develop the Phantom GT Academy FlyEase boots, designed with a fold-down heel and a wraparound strap closure in place of laces. In the aforementioned interview, she added,

Honestly, my first reaction when I saw the Phantom GT FlyEase was relief. I thought about my younger self and what it would have meant for me if something like this existed when I was growing up. I feel like this boot represents me and anybody else who is unique. FlyEase is very easy for anybody to put on quickly, which I love.

== Personal life ==
Pickett was previously in a relationship with Racing Louisville FC teammate and former New Zealand international Abby Erceg.

== Career statistics ==
=== Club ===
As of November 23, 2024

Club	League	Season	League		Playoffs (Note: Includes NWSL playoffs and W-League Finals series)		Cup (Note: Includes the NWSL Challenge Cup)		Other		Total	
Club	League	Season	Apps	Goals	Apps	Goals	Apps	Goals	Apps	Goals	Apps	Goals
Seattle Reign FC	NWSL	2016	15	0	—						15	0
Seattle Reign FC	NWSL	2017	21	0	—						21	0
Seattle Reign FC	Total		36	0	0	0	0	0	0	0	36	0
Orlando Pride	NWSL	2018	19	0	—						19	0
Orlando Pride	NWSL	2019	20	0	—						20	0
Orlando Pride	Total		39	0	0	0	0	0	0	0	39	0
Brisbane Roar (loan)	W-League	2017–18	12	1	1	0	—				13	1
Brisbane Roar (loan)	W-League	2018–19	12	2	1	0	—				13	2
Brisbane Roar (loan)	W-League	2019–20	11	3	—						11	3
Brisbane Roar (loan)	Total		35	6	2	0	0	0	0	0	37	6
North Carolina Courage	NWSL	2021	24	0	1	0	4	0	—		29	0
North Carolina Courage	NWSL	2022	20	1	—		7	0	—		27	1
North Carolina Courage	Total		44	1	1	0	11	0	0	0	56	1
Racing Louisville FC	NWSL	2023	20	0	—		6	0	—		26	0
Racing Louisville FC	NWSL	2024	16	1	—		—		2 (Note: Includes the 2024 NWSL x Liga MX Femenil Summer Cup)	1	18	2
Racing Louisville FC	Total		36	1	0	0	6	0	2	1	44	2
Orlando Pride	NWSL	2024	7	1	3	0	—		—		10	1
Orlando Pride	NWSL	2025	22	3	2	0	—		—		24	3
Orlando Pride	Total		29	4	5	0	0	0	0	0	34	4
Career total			219	12	8	0	17	0	2	1	246	13

=== International ===
As of match played October 11, 2022

National Team	Year	Apps	Goals
United States	2022	2	0
Total		2	0

== Honors ==
Orlando Pride

- NWSL Championship: 2024
- NWSL Shield: 2024

Individual

- NWSL Best XI: 2021, 2022

== See also ==
- List of Florida State University alumni
