= Maddie Bauer =

American soccer player (born 1995)

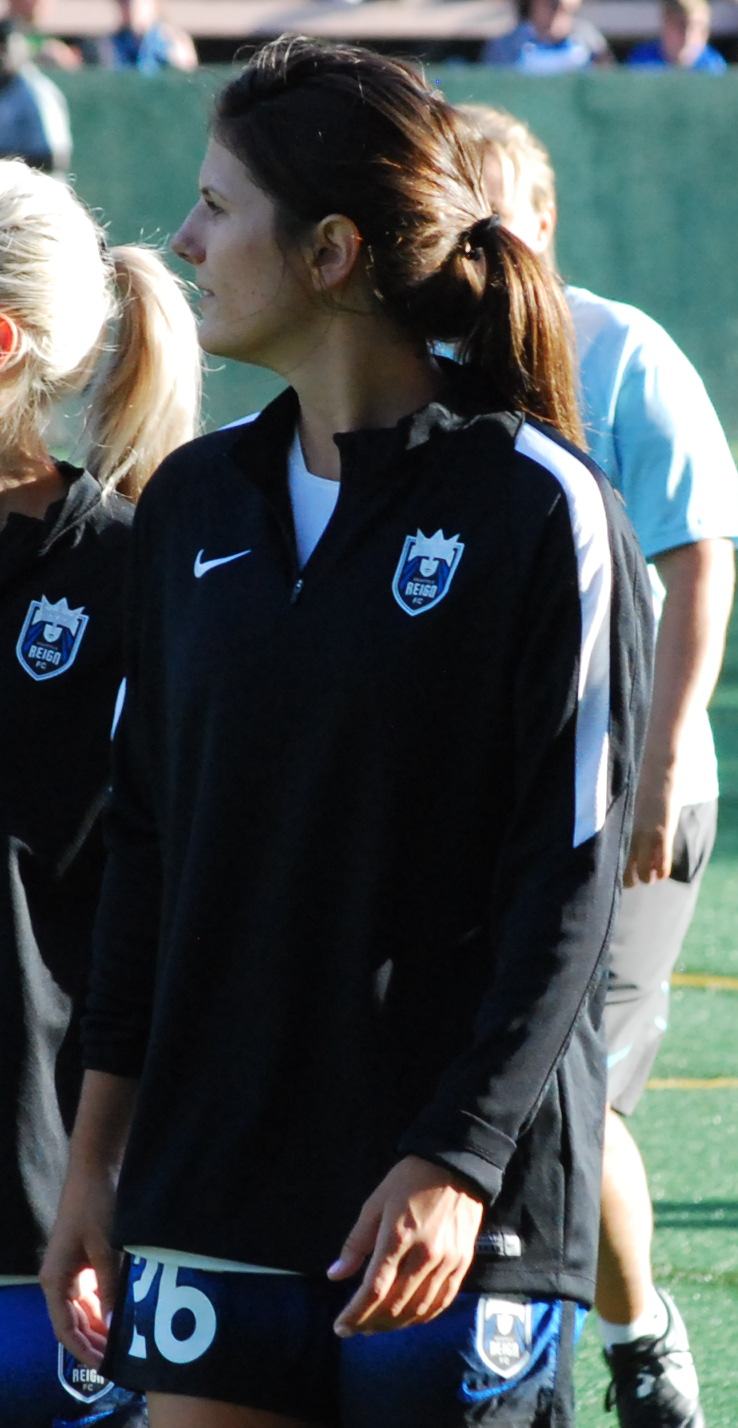
- Bauer with Seattle Reign FC in 2017

Personal information
- Full name: Madeline Ann Bauer
- Date of birth: March 20, 1995 (age 31)
- Place of birth: Newport Beach, California
- Height: 5 ft 8 in (1.73 m)
- Position: Defender

Youth career
- Slammers FC

College career
Years	Team	Apps	(Gls)
2013–2016	Stanford Cardinal	88	(1)

Senior career*
Years	Team	Apps	(Gls)
2017–2018	Seattle Reign FC	6	(0)
2018	Djurgården	10	(0)
2019	Fleury 91	7	(0)

International career
2012	United States U-17		
2014	United States U-20		
2016–2018	United States U-23		
- * Club domestic league appearances and goals as of July 16, 2018

Madeline Ann Bauer (born March 20, 1995) is an American soccer defender. She previously played for Fleury 91 in the Division 1 Féminine, Seattle Reign FC in the National Women's Soccer League (NWSL), and played collegiately for the Stanford Cardinal from 2012 to 2016. Bauer has represented the United States on the under-17, under-20 and under-23 national teams.

== Early life and education ==
Raised in Newport Beach, California, a suburb of Los Angeles, Bauer attended Mater Dei High School in the nearby city of Santa Ana. She played club soccer for Slammers FC and in 2012 led the team to be ranked as the top club in the Elite Clubs National League (ECNL). Bauer was twice named NSCAA Youth All-American and was nominated for the California Gatorade Girls Soccer Player of the Year award.

=== Stanford Cardinal, 2012–2016 ===
Bauer attended Stanford University, where she played for the Cardinal from 2012 to 2016 and majored in international relations. As a freshman, she started as a central defender in every match except one. She received NSCAA All-West Region first-team honors, was named to Top Drawer Soccer's Freshman Best XI first team, the All-Pac-12-second team and was a Pac-12 All-Freshman selection. During her sophomore season, she led a defense that conceded eight goals during the regular season starting in all 24 games. Bauer was earned All-Pac-12-second team honors for the second consecutive season and was named a Pac-12 All-Academic honorable mention. During her junior season, she started in 23 of 24 games and was again named to the All-Pac-12-second team for the third consecutive year. She was named to the NSCAA All-Pacific Region first team and NSCAA Scholar All-America third team. As a senior, she started all 21 games and scored her first goal for the Cardinal – a game-winner – during a 3–2 double-overtime win against UCLA. Bauer was named a MAC Hermann Trophy semi-finalist and earned NSCAA All-America first team, NSCAA All-Pacific Region first team, and All-Pac-12 first team honors. In November 2016, she was named the Pac-12 Women's Soccer Scholar-Athlete of the Year. During her collegiate career, she helped lead the Cardinal to four consecutive NCAA Division 1 Tournament appearances, including the College Cup final four in 2014.

== Club career ==
=== Seattle Reign FC, 2017–2018 ===
On January 12, 2017, Bauer was selected by Seattle Reign FC as the sixth overall selection in the 2017 NWSL College Draft. Of her selection, Reign head coach Laura Harvey said, "Maddie has been someone we have looked at all season... I think she can help us on the back line and in the midfield. The college that she played at plays a similar style of soccer to us, so it's been easy for me to see the things she's good at and areas for improvement."

On July 16, 2018, Bauer was waived by the Reign.

=== Djurgården, 2018–2019 ===
On July 18, 2018, she signed with Djurgården in the Damallsvenskan.

== International career ==
Bauer has represented the United States on the under-17, under-20, and under-23 national teams. She helped the team win the 2012 CONCACAF Women's U-17 Championship in Guatemala. She played every minute of the CONCACAF championship and recorded one assist. Bauer co-captained the under-17 team at the FIFA U-17 Women's World Cup in Azerbaijan the same year.

She represented the U.S. at the 2013 CONCACAF Women's U-17 Championship in Jamaica where the team finished in third place and qualified for the 2012 FIFA U-17 Women's World Cup in Costa Rica. In 2016, she competed with the under-23 team at the Women's Nordic Cup in England. In August 2018, Bauer was once again named to the United States U-23 team for the Nordic Cup.
