= 2006 CONCACAF Women's U-20 Championship squads =

List of the squads for the 2006 CONCACAF Women's U-20 Championship

This is a list of the squads for the 2006 CONCACAF Women's U-20 Championship, which was held in Mexico between January 18 and January 27, 2006. The 8 national teams involved in the tournament were required to register a squad of 20 players each, two of whom must be goalkeepers; only players in these squads were eligible to take part in the tournament.

== Group A ==
=== Canada ===
Coach: (Canada) Ian Bridge

No.	Pos.	Player	Date of birth (age)	Club
1	GK	Stephanie Labbé	10 October 1986 (aged 19)	(United States Soccer Federation) University of Connecticut
20	GK	Erin McNulty	3 June 1989 (aged 16)	(Canadian Soccer Association) NTC Prairies
2	DF	Katherine Radchuck	27 February 1986 (aged 19)	(United States Soccer Federation) University of Connecticut
4	DF	Caroline Vanderpool	15 July 1986 (aged 19)	(United States Soccer Federation) Louisiana State University
5	DF	Emily Zurrer	12 July 1987 (aged 18)	(Canadian Soccer Association) Vancouver Whitecaps
12	DF	Robin Rushton	2 January 1987 (aged 19)	(Canadian Soccer Association) Toronto Lady Lynx
18	DF	Eden Hingwing	11 June 1988 (aged 17)	(Canadian Soccer Association) NTC BC
3	MF	Sophie Schmidt	28 June 1988 (aged 17)	(Canadian Soccer Association) Vancouver Whitecaps
6	MF	Kaylyn Kyle	6 October 1988 (aged 17)	(Canadian Soccer Association) NTC Prairies
8	MF	Véronique Maranda	18 August 1986 (aged 19)	(United States Soccer Federation) University of Tennessee
9	MF	Selenia Iacchelli	5 June 1986 (aged 19)	(Canadian Soccer Association) Edmonton Aviators
10	MF	Amanda Cicchini	28 February 1987 (aged 18)	(United States Soccer Federation) West Virginia University
11	MF	Desiree Scott	31 July 1987 (aged 18)	(Canadian Soccer Association) NTC Prairies
7	FW	Jodi-Ann Robinson	17 April 1989 (aged 16)	(Canadian Soccer Association) Semiahmoo Spirit
13	FW	Rheanne Sleiman	26 September 1989 (aged 16)	(Canadian Soccer Association) NTC BC
14	FW	Aysha Jamani	28 June 1987 (aged 18)	(United States Soccer Federation) University of Nebraska–Lincoln
15	FW	Kara Lang	22 October 1986 (aged 19)	(Canadian Soccer Association) Vancouver Whitecaps
16	FW	Paige Adams	6 February 1990 (aged 15)	(Canadian Soccer Association) Coquitlam City
17	FW	Molly Alexander	11 January 1986 (aged 20)	(United States Soccer Federation) Washington State University
19	FW	Lisa Collison	2 September 1986 (aged 19)	(United States Soccer Federation) Ohio State University

=== Mexico ===
Coach: (Mexico) Leonardo Cuéllar

No.	Pos.	Player	Date of birth (age)	Club
1	GK	Anjulí Ladrón de Guevara	7 October 1986 (aged 19)	(Mexican Football Federation) Chivas
12	GK	Erika Vanegas	7 July 1988 (aged 17)	(Mexican Football Federation) Guerreras
2	DF	Marisol Arévalo	8 June 1987 (aged 18)	(United States Soccer Federation) Ventura College
3	DF	Nancy Gutiérrez	2 June 1987 (aged 18)	(United States Soccer Federation) Cerritos College
5	DF	Isabel Valdez	19 May 1986 (aged 19)	(Mexican Football Federation) México FC
4	MF	Leticia Villalpando	8 January 1988 (aged 18)	(United States Soccer Federation) Vista del Lago High School
6	MF	Rebecca Juárez	13 December 1986 (aged 19)	(United States Soccer Federation) Arsenal
7	MF	María de Lourdes Gordillo	3 April 1986 (aged 19)	(Mexican Football Federation) Andrea's Soccer
11	MF	Tania Morales	22 December 1986 (aged 19)	(Mexican Football Federation) Chivas
13	MF	Norma Méndez	10 March 1987 (aged 18)	(United States Soccer Federation) Arsenal
14	MF	Ana Lilia Gomez	24 July 1987 (aged 18)	(Mexican Football Federation) Asturias
15	MF	Rebecca Mendoza	12 July 1987 (aged 18)	(United States Soccer Federation) University of Notre Dame
8	FW	Christine Nieva	7 October 1986 (aged 19)	(United States Soccer Federation) Arizona State University
9	FW	Charlyn Corral	11 September 1991 (aged 14)	(Mexican Football Federation) Andrea's Soccer
10	FW	Mónica Ocampo	4 January 1987 (aged 19)	(Mexican Football Federation) Gacelas Univac
16	FW	Areli Martínez	11 March 1988 (aged 17)	(Mexican Football Federation) Selección Jalisco
17	FW	Janet Méndez	24 August 1988 (aged 17)	(United States Soccer Federation) Arsenal
18	FW	Nancy Gandarilla	30 January 1987 (aged 18)	(Mexican Football Federation) Atlas
19	FW	Monique Cisneros	17 November 1989 (aged 16)	(United States Soccer Federation) Mayfair High School
20	FW	Iliana Palma	11 May 1988 (aged 17)	(Mexican Football Federation) Andrea's Soccer

=== Panama ===
Coach: (France) Noel Deveaux

No.	Pos.	Player	Date of birth (age)	Club
1	GK	Laila Fuertes	22 October 1986 (aged 19)	(Panamanian Football Federation) ULACIT
12	GK	Farissa Córdoba	30 June 1989 (aged 16)	(Panamanian Football Federation) Navy Bay
2	DF	Kendra Chavarría	25 November 1989 (aged 16)	(Panamanian Football Federation) ULACIT
3	DF	Mayra de la Rosa	8 March 1986 (aged 19)	(Panamanian Football Federation) ULACIT
4	DF	Karol Solis	25 August 1986 (aged 19)	(Panamanian Football Federation) San Martin
6	DF	Belisa Belloso	25 June 1987 (aged 18)	(Panamanian Football Federation) Chorrera Sport
18	DF	Verónica Asprilla	17 July 1987 (aged 18)	(Panamanian Football Federation) Las Aguilas
5	MF	Yadira Pacheco	14 March 1989 (aged 16)	(Panamanian Football Federation) Navy Bay
8	MF	Katherine Sanchez	12 August 1989 (aged 16)	(Panamanian Football Federation) San Martin
10	MF	Yaremis Jimenez	13 November 1987 (aged 18)	(Panamanian Football Federation) American
11	MF	Sumara Samuels	19 October 1988 (aged 17)	(Panamanian Football Federation) ULACIT
14	MF	Kessiah Wattley	23 March 1989 (aged 16)	(Panamanian Football Federation) San Martin
15	MF	Nicole Abrego	29 September 1986 (aged 19)	(Panamanian Football Federation) ULACIT
19	MF	Carmen Quintana	5 October 1989 (aged 16)	(Panamanian Football Federation) San Martin
9	FW	Joan Rodriguez	19 March 1987 (aged 18)	(Panamanian Football Federation) San Martin
16	FW	Yaideth Espino	15 August 1987 (aged 18)	(Panamanian Football Federation) American
17	FW	Nayeli Machado	27 December 1987 (aged 18)	(Panamanian Football Federation) Navy Bay

=== Trinidad and Tobago ===
Coach: (Trinidad and Tobago) Jamaal Shabazz

No.	Pos.	Player	Date of birth (age)	Club
1	GK	Kimika Forbes	28 August 1990 (aged 15)	(Trinidad and Tobago Football Association) Stokely Vale
14	GK	Marissa Mohammed	20 February 1987 (aged 18)	(United States Soccer Federation) University of Tampa
21	GK	Julieann McDougall	18 October 1989 (aged 16)	(Trinidad and Tobago Football Association) St. Clair Coaching School
2	DF	Ayana Russell	16 March 1988 (aged 17)	(Trinidad and Tobago Football Association) Joe Public
3	DF	Anastasia Prescott	27 June 1987 (aged 18)	Unattached
4	DF	Katrina Meyer	23 September 1986 (aged 19)	(Trinidad and Tobago Football Association) Joe Public
5	DF	Kia Rigsby	9 March 1986 (aged 19)	(United States Soccer Federation) Florida International University
6	DF	Jemilia Mathlin	7 June 1986 (aged 19)	(Trinidad and Tobago Football Association) Real Dimensions
8	DF	Patrice Superville	8 April 1987 (aged 18)	(Trinidad and Tobago Football Association) Real Dimensions
16	DF	Christine Rose	7 March 1987 (aged 18)	(Trinidad and Tobago Football Association) Real Dimensions
7	MF	Dernelle Mascall	20 October 1988 (aged 17)	(Trinidad and Tobago Football Association) Petronin SC
11	MF	Janine François	1 January 1989 (aged 17)	(Trinidad and Tobago Football Association) Real Dimensions
13	MF	Bianca Walker	5 October 1988 (aged 17)	(Trinidad and Tobago Football Association) Real Dimensions
18	MF	Stephanie De Souza	15 December 1988 (aged 17)	(Trinidad and Tobago Football Association) Gulliver High School
20	MF	Tamar Watson	30 December 1987 (aged 18)	(Trinidad and Tobago Football Association) Real Dimensions
9	FW	Maylee Atthin-Johnson	9 May 1988 (aged 17)	(United States Soccer Federation) Cumberland University
10	FW	Aveann Douglas	10 August 1986 (aged 19)	(Trinidad and Tobago Football Association) Joe Public
19	FW	Kennya Cordner	11 November 1988 (aged 17)	(Trinidad and Tobago Football Association) St. Clair Coaching School
23	FW	Kermica Alexander	19 September 1986 (aged 19)	(Trinidad and Tobago Football Association) Memphis

== Group B ==
=== El Salvador ===
Coach: (El Salvador) José Ricardo Herrera

No.	Pos.	Player	Date of birth (age)	Club
1	GK	Sulma Villatoro	22 November 1986 (aged 19)	(Salvadoran Football Federation) La Unión
25	GK	Ana Bermudez	27 July 1986 (aged 19)	(Salvadoran Football Federation) Usulután
2	DF	Elizabeth Garcia	20 April 1989 (aged 16)	(Salvadoran Football Federation) San Salvador
3	DF	Elena Caceres	31 October 1986 (aged 19)	(Salvadoran Football Federation) San Salvador
5	DF	Ana Silva Chicas	5 May 1986 (aged 19)	(Salvadoran Football Federation) Morazán
16	DF	Adriana Flores	24 January 1991 (aged 14)	(Salvadoran Football Federation) San Salvador
19	DF	Norma Portillo	11 February 1992 (aged 13)	(Salvadoran Football Federation) Usulután
20	DF	Ana Najarro	1 June 1986 (aged 19)	(Salvadoran Football Federation) San Salvador
4	MF	Karen Lemus	28 August 1989 (aged 16)	(Salvadoran Football Federation) Santa Ana
7	MF	Silvia Ramos	3 March 1988 (aged 17)	Unattached
8	MF	Patricia Cardona	24 August 1987 (aged 18)	(Salvadoran Football Federation) La Libertad
10	MF	Jenny Urias	10 January 1987 (aged 19)	(Salvadoran Football Federation) San Salvador
12	MF	Milagro Fuentes	8 July 1987 (aged 18)	(Salvadoran Football Federation) La Unión
14	MF	Miriam Serpas	17 March 1986 (aged 19)	(Salvadoran Football Federation) Usulután
15	MF	Celenia Rodriguez	9 January 1986 (aged 20)	(Salvadoran Football Federation) Ahuachapán
9	FW	Pamela Ramirez	1 November 1987 (aged 18)	Unattached
11	FW	Patricia Campos	17 March 1987 (aged 18)	(Salvadoran Football Federation) Usulután
13	FW	Jael Gomez	9 March 1989 (aged 16)	(Salvadoran Football Federation) San Salvador
17	FW	Urania Rosales	12 October 1990 (aged 15)	Unattached
18	FW	Flor Velásquez	26 November 1986 (aged 19)	Unattached

=== Jamaica ===
Coach: (Jamaica) Vin Blaine

No.	Pos.	Player	Date of birth (age)	Club
1	GK	Ashlie Wellington	21 October 1989 (aged 16)	Unattached
13	GK	Paula Jackson	19 October 1988 (aged 17)	(Jamaica Football Federation) Harbour View
6	DF	Marcillee McBean	12 March 1989 (aged 16)	(Jamaica Football Federation) St. Catherine
8	DF	Julie Fearon	31 January 1986 (aged 19)	(Jamaica Football Federation) Barbican
12	DF	Natalya Manyan	20 January 1986 (aged 19)	(Jamaica Football Federation) Waterhouse
15	DF	Kylela Brownhill	25 May 1987 (aged 18)	(Jamaica Football Federation) Waterhouse
16	DF	Yolanda Hamilton	26 May 1987 (aged 18)	(Jamaica Football Federation) Barbican
18	DF	Staci-Ann Johnson	11 May 1986 (aged 19)	(Jamaica Football Federation) Harbour View
9	MF	Peta-Gaye Soman	6 June 1988 (aged 17)	(Jamaica Football Federation) Harbour View
10	MF	Omolyn Davis	9 August 1987 (aged 18)	(Jamaica Football Federation) Waterhouse
11	MF	Kimmia Parker	2 February 1989 (aged 16)	(Jamaica Football Federation) Harbour View
14	MF	Rochelle Bryan	11 December 1987 (aged 18)	(Jamaica Football Federation) Portmore Strikers
17	MF	Shereen Clarke	4 April 1990 (aged 15)	(Jamaica Football Federation) Portmore Strikers
19	MF	Shakira Duncan	1 October 1989 (aged 16)	(Jamaica Football Federation) Harbour View
20	MF	Christina Murray	8 October 1989 (aged 16)	(Jamaica Football Federation) Waterhouse
22	MF	Yanique Goldspring	22 April 1986 (aged 19)	(Jamaica Football Federation) Barbican
3	FW	Correne Walker	11 March 1986 (aged 19)	(Jamaica Football Federation) Waterhouse
4	FW	Shanique Mitchell	10 August 1989 (aged 16)	(Jamaica Football Federation) Harbour View
5	FW	Kanesha Reid	19 November 1989 (aged 16)	(Jamaica Football Federation) Barbican
7	FW	Venicia Reid	28 October 1987 (aged 18)	(Jamaica Football Federation) Portmore Strikers

=== Suriname ===
Coach: (Suriname) Kenneth Jaliens

No.	Pos.	Player	Date of birth (age)	Club
1	GK	Lorraine Dompig	14 June 1987 (aged 18)	(Surinamese Football Association) Dosko
22	GK	Cheryl Gallant	24 August 1990 (aged 15)	(Surinamese Football Association) Merodia
2	DF	Roxane Djarksi	22 June 1989 (aged 16)	(Surinamese Football Association) Witsanti
3	DF	Jefta Plato	26 May 1986 (aged 19)	(Surinamese Football Association) Adjoema
4	DF	Charissa Jakaoemo	25 August 1987 (aged 18)	(Surinamese Football Association) Adjoema
5	DF	Vanessa Napo	16 May 1986 (aged 19)	(Surinamese Football Association) Diva
15	DF	Debora Jeso	29 November 1986 (aged 19)	(Surinamese Football Association) Diva
17	DF	Rachel Jubitana	17 April 1987 (aged 18)	(Surinamese Football Association) Witsanti
6	MF	Rowena Taweroe	10 November 1988 (aged 17)	(Surinamese Football Association) Ananaca
8	MF	Cherrilynn Alimoenadi	4 February 1988 (aged 17)	(Surinamese Football Association) Oemasoso
13	MF	Olga Adelaar	14 February 1987 (aged 18)	(Surinamese Football Association) Witsanti
16	MF	Lucretia Krak	8 August 1989 (aged 16)	(Surinamese Football Association) Dosko
7	FW	Lucretia Hasselnook	8 August 1989 (aged 16)	(Surinamese Football Association) Oemasoso
9	FW	Onica Tol	26 October 1986 (aged 19)	(Surinamese Football Association) Diva
10	FW	Aisa Smit	17 November 1986 (aged 19)	(Surinamese Football Association) Diva
11	FW	Daniella Rolder	14 May 1987 (aged 18)	(Surinamese Football Association) Merodia
12	FW	Vanity Eyken	8 November 1987 (aged 18)	(Surinamese Football Association) Oemasoso
14	FW	Eline Scholsberg	1 June 1988 (aged 17)	(Surinamese Football Association) Dosko

=== United States ===
Coach: (United States) Tim Schulz

No.	Pos.	Player	Date of birth (age)	Club
1	GK	Valerie Henderson	19 April 1986 (aged 19)	(United States Soccer Federation) UCLA
18	GK	Kelsey Davis	14 May 1987 (aged 18)	(United States Soccer Federation) UCLA
3	DF	Stephanie Logterman	25 February 1986 (aged 19)	(United States Soccer Federation) University of Texas
4	DF	Carrie Dew	8 December 1986 (aged 19)	(United States Soccer Federation) University of Notre Dame
5	DF	Nikki Krzysik	23 May 1987 (aged 18)	(United States Soccer Federation) University of Virginia
17	DF	Sarah Wagenfuhr	31 December 1986 (aged 19)	(United States Soccer Federation) Florida State University
19	DF	Meagan Holmes	21 February 1986 (aged 19)	(United States Soccer Federation) USC
20	DF	Kasey Moore	3 August 1987 (aged 18)	(United States Soccer Federation) University of Texas
7	MF	Amanda Poach	25 July 1987 (aged 18)	(United States Soccer Federation) Santa Clara University
10	MF	Allie Long	13 August 1987 (aged 18)	(United States Soccer Federation) Pennsylvania State University
11	MF	Brittany Bock	11 April 1987 (aged 18)	(United States Soccer Federation) University of Notre Dame
13	MF	Tina DiMartino	6 November 1986 (aged 19)	(United States Soccer Federation) UCLA
15	MF	Lindsey Beam	27 March 1986 (aged 19)	(United States Soccer Federation) University of North Carolina
2	FW	Jordan Angeli	31 May 1986 (aged 19)	(United States Soccer Federation) Santa Clara University
6	FW	Brittany Taylor	18 September 1987 (aged 18)	(United States Soccer Federation) University of Connecticut
8	FW	Lauren Cheney	30 September 1987 (aged 18)	(United States Soccer Federation) Ben Davis High School
9	FW	Danesha Adams	6 June 1986 (aged 19)	(United States Soccer Federation) UCLA
12	FW	Amy Rodriguez	17 February 1987 (aged 18)	(United States Soccer Federation) USC
14	FW	Jessica Rostedt	3 March 1986 (aged 19)	(United States Soccer Federation) University of Virginia
16	FW	Kelley O'Hara	4 August 1988 (aged 17)	(United States Soccer Federation) Starr's Mill High School
