= 2008 CONCACAF Women's Olympic Qualifying Tournament squads =

Association football tournament squads

The 2008 CONCACAF Women's Olympic Qualifying Tournament was an international football tournament that was held in Mexico from 2 to 12 April 2008. The six national teams involved in the tournament were required to register a squad of 20 players – of which two had to be goalkeepers – by 31 March 2008, two days prior to the opening match of the tournament. Only players in these squads were eligible to take part in the tournament.

The age listed for each player is on 2 April 2008, the first day of the tournament. The numbers of caps and goals listed for each player do not include any matches played after the start of the tournament. The club listed is the club for which the player last played a competitive match prior to the tournament. A flag is included for coaches who are of a different nationality to their team.

== Group A ==
=== Jamaica ===
Manager: (Brazil) René Simões

No.	Pos.	Player	Date of birth (age)	Caps	Goals	Club
1	GK	Nicoda Linton	28 May 1989 (aged 18)			Unattached
3	MF	Marcilee McBean	12 March 1989 (aged 19)			Unattached
4	DF	Christina Murray	8 October 1989 (aged 18)			Unattached
5	DF	Monique Pryce	18 May 1991 (aged 16)			Unattached
6	DF	Janice Rennalls	6 September 1991 (aged 16)			Unattached
7	FW	Venicia Reid	28 October 1987 (aged 20)			(Jamaica Football Federation) Portmore Strikers
8	FW	Kenesha Reid	19 November 1989 (aged 18)			Unattached
9	MF	Alicia James	22 September 1982 (aged 25)			Unattached
10	FW	Tashana Vincent	23 March 1987 (aged 21)			Unattached
11	MF	Jodi-Ann McGregor	10 April 1985 (aged 22)			Unattached
12	MF	Iesha Mowatt	23 September 1984 (aged 23)			Unattached
13	GK	Nikkeshi Thomas	28 September 1982 (aged 25)			Unattached
14	MF	Omolyn Davis	9 August 1987 (aged 20)			(United States Soccer Federation) Lindsey Wilson Blue Raiders
16	DF	Tanesia Vassell	15 July 1981 (aged 26)			(Jamaica Football Federation) Harbour View
17	MF	Christina Chang	13 June 1985 (aged 22)			Unattached
18	DF	Stacy-Ann Johnson	11 May 1986 (aged 21)			(Jamaica Football Federation) Harbour View
19	DF	Latoya Panton	23 July 1987 (aged 20)			Unattached
21	DF	Natalya Manyan	20 January 1987 (aged 21)			(United States Soccer Federation) Oral Roberts Golden Eagles
22	DF	Yolanda Hamilton	26 May 1987 (aged 20)			(United States Soccer Federation) Lindsey Wilson Blue Raiders
23	FW	Shakira Duncan	10 January 1989 (aged 19)			Unattached

=== Mexico ===
Manager: Leonardo Cuéllar

Mexico named their final squad on 29 March 2008.

No.	Pos.	Player	Date of birth (age)	Caps	Goals	Club
1	GK	Pamela Tajonar	2 December 1984 (aged 23)			(Mexican Football Federation) ITESM Campus Puebla
2	DF	Leticia Villalpando	8 January 1986 (aged 22)			(United States Soccer Federation) UC Riverside Highlanders
3	DF	Marlene Sandoval	18 January 1984 (aged 24)			(Mexican Football Federation) México FC
4	DF	Natalie Vinti	2 January 1988 (aged 20)			(United States Soccer Federation) San Diego Toreros
5	DF	María de Jesús Castillo	6 July 1983 (aged 24)			(Mexican Football Federation) Universidad de Guadalajara
6	MF	Mónica Vergara	2 May 1983 (aged 24)			(Mexican Football Federation) México FC
7	MF	Evelyn López	25 December 1978 (aged 29)			(Mexican Football Federation) México FC
8	FW	Carmen Padilla	2 May 1985 (aged 22)			(United States Soccer Federation) California Storm
9	FW	Mónica Ocampo	4 January 1987 (aged 21)			(Mexican Football Federation) Dragonas del Instituto Oriente
10	FW	Lupita Worbis	12 December 1983 (aged 24)			(Mexican Football Federation) ITESM Campus Puebla
11	MF	Patricia Pérez	17 December 1976 (aged 31)			(Mexican Football Federation) México FC
13	DF	María Gordillo	3 April 1986 (aged 21)			(Mexican Football Federation) Dragonas del Instituto Oriente
14	DF	Isabel Valdez	19 May 1986 (aged 21)			(Mexican Football Federation) México FC
15	DF	Luz Saucedo	14 December 1983 (aged 24)			(Mexican Football Federation) México FC
17	MF	Tania Morales	22 December 1986 (aged 21)			(Mexican Football Federation) Universidad de Guadalajara
18	FW	Charlyn Corral	11 September 1991 (aged 16)			(Mexican Football Federation) Andrea's Soccer
19	FW	Iris Mora	22 September 1981 (aged 26)			(United States Soccer Federation) West Coast FC
20	GK	Sophia Pérez	6 June 1992 (aged 15)			(United States Soccer Federation) San Diego Sunwaves
22	MF	Angélica Figueroa	14 May 1990 (aged 17)			(United States Soccer Federation) Linden Lions
23	MF	Rebecca Mendoza	12 July 1987 (aged 20)			(Mexican Football Federation) Universidad Autónoma de Durango

=== United States ===
Manager: (Sweden) Pia Sundhage

The United States named their squad on 31 March 2008.

No.	Pos.	Player	Date of birth (age)	Caps	Goals	Club
1	GK	Nicole Barnhart	10 October 1981 (aged 26)	6	0	Unattached
2	DF	Rachel Buehler	26 August 1985 (aged 22)	4	0	(United States Soccer Federation) Stanford Cardinal
3	DF	Christie Rampone	24 June 1975 (aged 32)	183	4	Unattached
4	DF	Cat Whitehill	10 February 1982 (aged 26)	125	11	Unattached
5	FW	Lindsay Tarpley	22 September 1983 (aged 24)	86	23	Unattached
6	FW	Natasha Kai	22 May 1983 (aged 24)	39	10	Unattached
7	MF	Shannon Boxx	29 June 1977 (aged 30)	84	18	Unattached
8	FW	Lauren Cheney	30 September 1987 (aged 20)	7	2	(United States Soccer Federation) UCLA Bruins
9	MF	Heather O'Reilly	2 January 1985 (aged 23)	79	17	Unattached
10	MF	Kacey White	27 April 1984 (aged 23)	2	0	Unattached
11	MF	Carli Lloyd	16 July 1982 (aged 25)	51	11	Unattached
12	MF	Leslie Osborne	27 May 1983 (aged 24)	57	2	Unattached
13	MF	Tobin Heath	29 May 1988 (aged 19)	6	1	(United States Soccer Federation) North Carolina Tar Heels
14	DF	Stephanie Cox	3 April 1986 (aged 21)	37	0	(United States Soccer Federation) Portland Pilots
15	DF	Kate Markgraf	23 August 1976 (aged 31)	173	0	Unattached
16	MF	Angela Hucles	5 July 1978 (aged 29)	75	5	Unattached
17	DF	Lori Chalupny	29 January 1984 (aged 24)	60	6	Unattached
18	GK	Hope Solo	30 July 1981 (aged 26)	56	0	Unattached
19	FW	Amy Rodriguez	17 February 1987 (aged 21)	12	3	(United States Soccer Federation) USC Trojans
20	FW	Abby Wambach	2 June 1980 (aged 27)	112	89	Unattached

== Group B ==
=== Canada ===
Manager: (Norway) Even Pellerud

Canada announced their squad on 30 March 2008.

No.	Pos.	Player	Date of birth (age)	Caps	Goals	Club
1	GK	Karina LeBlanc	30 March 1980 (aged 28)			Unattached
2	DF	Kristina Kiss	13 February 1981 (aged 27)			Unattached
3	DF	Melanie Booth	24 August 1984 (aged 23)			(United States Soccer Federation) Florida State Seminoles
4	MF	Clare Rustad	27 May 1983 (aged 24)			(Canadian Soccer Association) Vancouver Whitecaps FC
5	DF	Robyn Gayle	31 October 1985 (aged 22)			(United States Soccer Federation) North Carolina Tar Heels
6	DF	Sophie Schmidt	28 June 1988 (aged 19)			(United States Soccer Federation) Portland Pilots
7	FW	Rhian Wilkinson	12 May 1982 (aged 25)			(Canadian Soccer Association) Ottawa Fury
8	MF	Diana Matheson	16 April 1984 (aged 23)			(United States Soccer Federation) Princeton Tigers
9	DF	Candace Chapman	21 April 1983 (aged 24)			(Canadian Soccer Association) Vancouver Whitecaps FC
10	DF	Martina Franko	13 January 1976 (aged 32)			(Canadian Soccer Association) Vancouver Whitecaps FC
11	DF	Randee Hermus	14 November 1979 (aged 28)			(Canadian Soccer Association) Vancouver Whitecaps FC
12	FW	Christine Sinclair	12 June 1983 (aged 24)			(Canadian Soccer Association) Vancouver Whitecaps FC
13	MF	Amy Walsh	13 September 1977 (aged 30)			(Canadian Soccer Association) Laval Comets
14	FW	Melissa Tancredi	27 December 1981 (aged 26)			Unattached
15	FW	Kara Lang	22 October 1986 (aged 21)			(United States Soccer Federation) UCLA Bruins
16	FW	Jonelle Filigno	24 September 1990 (aged 17)			Unattached
17	MF	Brittany Timko	9 May 1985 (aged 22)			(Canadian Soccer Association) Vancouver Whitecaps FC
18	GK	Erin McLeod	26 February 1983 (aged 25)			(Canadian Soccer Association) Vancouver Whitecaps FC
19	DF	Lexi Marton	28 April 1990 (aged 17)			Unattached
21	FW	Jodi-Ann Robinson	17 April 1989 (aged 18)			(Canadian Soccer Association) Vancouver Whitecaps FC

=== Costa Rica ===
Manager: Juan Diego Quesada

No.	Pos.	Player	Date of birth (age)	Caps	Goals	Club
1	GK	Priscilla Tapia	2 May 1991 (aged 16)			(Costa Rican Football Federation) Puntarenas
2	DF	Adriana Rodríguez	12 May 1989 (aged 18)			(Costa Rican Football Federation) CCD San José
3	DF	Vanessa Rojas	10 November 1986 (aged 21)			(United States Soccer Federation) Loyola Marymount Lions
4	DF	Karol Gálvez	24 February 1988 (aged 20)			(Costa Rican Football Federation) Arenal Coronado
5	DF	Amanda Esquivel	16 September 1987 (aged 20)			(United States Soccer Federation) San Diego Toreros
6	DF	Gabriela Trujillo	21 November 1978 (aged 29)			(Royal Spanish Football Federation) Hércules
7	MF	Mariela Campos	4 January 1991 (aged 17)			(Costa Rican Football Federation) UCEM Alajuela
8	FW	Mónica Malavassi	24 May 1989 (aged 18)			(Costa Rican Football Federation) Arenal Coronado
9	DF	Paola Alvarado	6 January 1990 (aged 18)			Unattached
10	MF	Katherine Alvarado	11 April 1991 (aged 16)			(Costa Rican Football Federation) CCD San José
11	FW	Raquel Rodríguez	28 October 1993 (aged 14)			(Costa Rican Football Federation) CCD San José
12	FW	Laura Sánchez	9 July 1985 (aged 22)			(Costa Rican Football Federation) UCEM Alajuela
13	MF	Megan Chávez	4 December 1983 (aged 24)			(Costa Rican Football Federation) Arenal Coronado
14	FW	Amara Wilson	25 May 1985 (aged 22)			
15	MF	Cristín Granados	19 August 1989 (aged 18)			(Costa Rican Football Federation) Arenal Coronado
16	MF	Yuliana Rodríguez	12 November 1989 (aged 18)			(Costa Rican Football Federation) UCEM Alajuela
17	FW	Adriana Venegas	12 June 1989 (aged 18)			(Costa Rican Football Federation) CCD San José
18	GK	Yirlania Arroyo	28 May 1986 (aged 21)			Unattached
19	DF	María Flores	14 April 1988 (aged 19)			(Costa Rican Football Federation) Arenal Coronado
20	DF	Wendy Acosta	19 December 1989 (aged 18)			(Costa Rican Football Federation) Sportek de Heredia

=== Trinidad and Tobago ===
Manager: Jamaal Shabazz

No.	Pos.	Player	Date of birth (age)	Caps	Goals	Club
1	GK	Kimika Forbes	28 August 1990 (aged 17)			(Trinidad and Tobago Football Association) Bellaforma Angels
2	MF	Ayana Russell	16 March 1988 (aged 20)			(Trinidad and Tobago Football Association) Joe Public
3	DF	Anastasia Prescott	27 June 1987 (aged 20)			(Trinidad and Tobago Football Association) Real Dimensions
4	DF	Katrina Meyer	23 September 1986 (aged 21)			(Trinidad and Tobago Football Association) Joe Public
5	DF	Annalis Cummings	10 February 1989 (aged 19)			(Trinidad and Tobago Football Association) Joe Public
6	MF	Niasha Reyes	22 August 1985 (aged 22)			(Trinidad and Tobago Football Association) Real Dimensions
7	MF	Dernelle Mascall	20 October 1988 (aged 19)			(Trinidad and Tobago Football Association) Moruga United
8	DF	Sadjr Williams	1 July 1989 (aged 18)			Unattached
9	FW	Maylee Atthin-Johnson	9 May 1986 (aged 21)			(Trinidad and Tobago Football Association) Caridoc Stingrays
10	MF	Tasha St. Louis	20 December 1983 (aged 24)			(United States Soccer Federation) New England Mutiny
11	DF	Aveann Douglas	10 August 1986 (aged 21)			(Trinidad and Tobago Football Association) Joe Public
12	MF	Ahkeela Mollon	4 February 1985 (aged 23)			(United States Soccer Federation) Charlotte Lady Eagles
13	DF	Patrice Superville	8 April 1987 (aged 20)			(Trinidad and Tobago Football Association) Real Dimensions
14	MF	Marissa Mohammed	20 February 1987 (aged 21)			(United States Soccer Federation) Fredericksburg Lady Gunners
15	FW	Tricia Cooper	9 March 1976 (aged 32)			Unattached
16	MF	Avanell Isaac	19 April 1990 (aged 17)			(Trinidad and Tobago Football Association) Joe Public
18	MF	Jenelle Nedd	30 October 1988 (aged 19)			(Trinidad and Tobago Football Association) Joe Public
19	FW	Kennya Cordner	11 November 1986 (aged 21)			(United States Soccer Federation) Northampton Laurels
20	DF	Maria Mohammed	20 February 1987 (aged 21)			(United States Soccer Federation) Fredericksburg Lady Gunners
21	DF	Regina McGee	20 February 1984 (aged 24)			
