= 2010 Boston Breakers season =

Boston Breakers
2010 season
- Lead investor: Gary Loveman
- Head coach: Tony DiCicco
- Stadium: Harvard Stadium
- WPS: 2nd
- Playoffs: TBD
- Women's U.S. Open Cup: Did not enter
Home colors	Away colors

The 2010 Boston Breakers season was the club's second season in Women's Professional Soccer and their second consecutive season in the top division of women's soccer in the American soccer pyramid. Including the WUSA franchise, it was the club's fifth year of existence.

== Match results ==
=== Key ===
Win Tie Loss

=== WPS ===
Note: Results are given with Boston Breakers' score listed first.

Game	Date	Location	Opponent	Result	Attendance	BOS goalscorers
1	4/10/10	Maryland SoccerPlex	Washington Freedom	2-1	3,899	L. Cheney 8'; K.Smith 18'
2	4/18/10	Harvard Stadium	Philadelphia Independence	1-1	5,286	K. Smith 49'
3	4/25/10	Anheuser-Busch Center	St. Louis Athletica	1-1	3,300	K. Moore 21'
4	5/8/10	Maryland SoccerPlex	Washington Freedom	0-0	4,198	
5	5/14/10	Harvard Stadium	FC Gold Pride	1-2	3,899	K. Smith 22'
6	5/29/10	Yurcak Field	Sky Blue FC	0-0	3,418	
7	6/13/10	Harvard Stadium	Sky Blue FC	1-2	4,687	J. Angeli 14'
8	6/19/10	Pioneer Stadium	FC Gold Pride	0-1	3,588	
9	6/25/10	Harvard Stadium	Chicago Red Stars	1-2	3,647	Fabiana 8'
10	7/4/10	John A. Farrell Stadium	Philadelphia Independence	2-1	2,093	L. Cheney 46'; K. Lilly 84'
11	7/11/10	Harvard Stadium	Atlanta Beat	3-1	4,194	J. Angeli 50'; K. Smith 54'; L. Bogus 55'
12	7/18/10	Harvard Stadium	Washington Freedom	2-1	4,651	L. Bogus 23'; J. Angeli 74'
13	7/21/10	Harvard Stadium	FC Gold Pride	1-2	3,052	J. Angeli 30'
14	7/25/10	Toyota Park	Chicago Red Stars	3-1	3,673	K. Smith 9', 12'; I. Dieke 14'
15	7/31/10	Harvard Stadium	Washington Freedom	3-1	4,468	K. Smith 21'; J. Angeli 56'; L. Cheney 85'
16	8/4/10	Harvard Stadium	Atlanta Beat	2-0	3,251	K. Smith 1', 62'
17	8/8/10	John A. Farrell Stadium	Philadelphia Independence	2-2	3,091	L. Cheney 25'; K. Smith 52'
18	8/15/10	Harvard Stadium	Sky Blue FC	4-0	6,108	L. Cheney 9'; J. Angeli 37'; L. Tarpley 50'; L. Del Rio 80'
19	8/21/10	Veterans Stadium	Atlanta Beat	3-2	4,071	L. Chalupny 11'; E. Aluko 66', 73'
20	8/29/10	John A. Farrell Stadium	Philadelphia Independence	2-1	4,011	S. Cox 35'; K. Smith 60'
21	9/1/10	KSU Soccer Stadium	Atlanta Beat	3-0	2,267	L. Tarpley 22'; J. Angeli; 33'K. Lilly 45'
22	9/5/10	Pioneer Stadium	FC Gold Pride	0-2	2,447	
23	9/11/10	Yurcak Field	Sky Blue FC	0-0	3,810	
24	9/23/10	Soldier Field	Philadelphia Independence	1-2	2,676	L. Cheney 22'

== Club ==
Roster

Note: Flags indicate national team as defined under FIFA eligibility rules; some limited exceptions apply. Players may hold more than one non-FIFA nationality.

No.	Pos.	Nation	Player
1	GK	USA	Alyssa Naeher
2	MF	USA	Chioma Igwe
4	DF	USA	Jordan Angeli
5	FW	USA	Lindsay Tarpley
6	DF	USA	Amy LePeilbet
7	MF	USA	Liz Bogus
8	FW	USA	Lauren Cheney
9	FW	AUS	Sarah Walsh
10	FW	ENG	Kelly Smith
12	MF	USA	Leslie Osborne

No.	Pos.	Nation	Player
13	MF	USA	Kristine Lilly
14	DF	USA	Stephanie Cox
15	FW	BRA	Fabiana
16	FW	ESP	Laura del Río
17	DF	USA	Kasey Moore
18	GK	USA	Allison Lipsher
20	DF	SCO	Ifeoma Dieke
22	DF	ENG	Alex Scott
24	GK	USA	Ashley Phillips
25	FW	USA	Taryn Hemmings

Front office

- Lead investor: Gary Loveman
- Core investors: Alex Zecca, Louis Hernandez
- Managing partner: Michael Stoller
- Investors: Lyman Bullard
- General Manager: Andy Crossley
- Director of Entertainment and Production: Bailey Frye
- Director of Operations: John Cunningham
- Player Services Coordinator: Natalie Akula
- Team Manager: Stephanie Schafer
- Director of Ticket Sales: Heather Pease
- Account Executive: Meighan Kelly

Coaching staff

Position	Staff
Head coach	(United States) Tony DiCicco
Assistant coach	(United States) Lisa Cole
Goalkeeper coach	(United States) Nathan Kipp
Equipment manager	(United States) Hayley George
Team doctor	(United States) Rob Nicoletta, MD

Last updated: August 8, 2011
Source: Boston Breakers Official Website

== Standings ==
Pos	Team	Pld	W	D	L	GF	GA	GD	Pts	Qualification
1	FC Gold Pride	24	16	5	3	46	19	+27	53	Advance to Championship
2	Boston Breakers	24	10	6	8	36	28	+8	36	Advance to Super Semifinal
3	Philadelphia Independence	24	10	4	10	37	36	+1	34	Advance to First Round
4	Washington Freedom	24	8	7	9	33	33	0	31	Advance to First Round
5	Sky Blue FC	24	7	7	10	20	31	−11	28	

Source: WPS Soccerway
Rules for classification: 1) points, 2) goal difference, 3) head-to-head result.

== Awards ==
=== Individual Player Awards ===
- Amy LePeilbet, WPS 2010 Defender of the Year

==== WPS Player of the Week ====
Week	Player	Ref.
17	(England) Kelly Smith	

==== WPS Player of the Month ====
Month	Player	Ref
July	(United States) Jordan Angeli	
August	(England) Kelly Smith	

== See also ==
- 2010 Women's Professional Soccer season
- 2010 U.S. Open Cup
- 2010 in American soccer
- Boston Breakers
