= 2011 Boston Breakers season =

Boston Breakers
2011 season
- Owner: Gary Loveman
- Head coach: Tony DiCicco
- Stadium: Harvard Stadium
- Women's Professional Soccer: 5th
- Playoffs: TBD
- Women's U.S. Open Cup: Did not enter
Home colors	Away colors

The 2011 Boston Breakers season was the club's third season in Women's Professional Soccer and their third consecutive season in the top division of women's soccer in the American soccer pyramid. Including the WUSA franchise, it was the club's sixth year of existence.

== Match results ==
=== Key ===
Win Tie Loss

=== Regular season ===
Note: Results are given with Boston Breakers' score listed first.

Game	Date	Location	Opponent	Result	Attendance	BOS Goal Scorers
1	April 9, 2011	A	Atlanta Beat	4–1	4,402	Angeli 18'; Winters 23'; O'Hara 72'; Moore 90'
2	April 17, 2011	H	Western New York Flash	1–2	4,158	Smith 90'
3	April 23, 2011	A	magicJack	0–1	1,224	
4	May 1, 2011	H	Sky Blue FC	1–0	2,789	Buehler 53'
5	May 8, 2011	A	Philadelphia Independence	0–2	2,128	
6	May 13, 2011	A	Western New York Flash	2–3	1,738	Bogus 38'; Moore 80' (pen.)
7	May 22, 2011	H	Philadelphia Independence	1–1	6,128	Cheney 48'
8	May 28, 2011	A	Sky Blue FC	1–2	1,912	O'Hara 50'
9	June 5, 2011	H	magicJack	2–1	3,126	Schoepfer 7'; Klingenberg 19'
10	June 12, 2011	A	Sky Blue FC	0–0	994	
11	June 19, 2011	A	Atlanta Beat	0–0	3,654	
12	July 10, 2011	H	Atlanta Beat	2–0	2,749	Winters 4'; Schoepfer 81'
13	July 24, 2011	H	Western New York Flash	2–2	6,222	O'Hara 20'; O'Hara 84'
14	July 27, 2011	H	Philadelphia Independence	0–1	3,343	
15	July 30, 2011	A	magicJack	0–4	3,064	
16	August 3, 2011	A	Western New York Flash	1–2	4,463	Winters 47'
17	August 6, 2011	H	magicJack	0–2	7,188	
18	August 14, 2011	H	Sky Blue FC	2–0	4,289	Cheney 1'; Cheney 18'

=== Playoffs ===
Note: Results are given with Boston Breakers' score listed first.

Game	Date	Location	Opponent	Result	Attendance	BOS Goal Scorers
19	August 17, 2011	A	magicJack	1–3	2,075	Winters 31'

== Club ==
=== Roster ===
As of 18 July 2011.

Note: Flags indicate national team as defined under FIFA eligibility rules; some limited exceptions apply. Players may hold more than one non-FIFA nationality.

No.	Pos.	Nation	Player
1	GK	USA	Alyssa Naeher
2	MF	USA	Katie Schoepfer
3	DF	USA	Elli Reed
4	DF	USA	Jordan Angeli
6	DF	USA	Amy LePeilbet
7	MF	USA	Liz Bogus
8	FW	USA	Lauren Cheney
9	MF	AUS	Leah Blayney
10	FW	ENG	Kelly Smith
11	MF	USA	Niki Cross
12	MF	USA	Leslie Osborne (Captain)
14	DF	USA	Stephanie Cox
15	DF	USA	Rachel Buehler

No.	Pos.	Nation	Player
16	MF	USA	Meghan Klingenberg
17	DF	USA	Kasey Moore
18	GK	USA	Kelsey Davis
19	FW	USA	Kelley O'Hara
20	DF	SCO	Ifeoma Dieke
21	MF	USA	Keelin Winters
22	DF	ENG	Alex Scott
23	FW	USA	Claire Zimmeck
24	GK	USA	Ashley Phillips
25	FW	USA	Taryn Hemmings
28	DF	JPN	Aya Sameshima
29	GK	USA	Kati Jo Spisak
31	FW	USA	Megan Mischler
32	DF	USA	Nikki Marshall

=== Management and staff ===
Front office

Position	Staff
General Manager	(United States) Andy Crossley
Communications Manager	(United States) Ryan Wood
Customer Service Manager	(United States) Caitlin Pickul
Account Executive	(United States) Chris Kubiak
Sales Coordinator	(England) Lee Billiard

Last updated: August 8, 2011
Source: Boston Breakers Official Website

Coaching staff

Position	Staff
Head Coach	(United States) Tony DiCicco
Asst. Coach	(United States) Lisa Cole
Goalkeeper Coach	(United States) Nathan Kipp
Equipment Manager	(United States) Hayley George
Team Doctor	(United States) Rob Nicoletta, MD

Last updated: August 8, 2011
Source: Boston Breakers Official Website

== Standings ==
Blue denotes team has clinched regular season championship.
Green denotes team has spot in 2011 Women's Professional Soccer Playoffs.
Red denotes team has been eliminated from playoff contention.

Place	Team	Pld	W	D	L	GF	GA	GD	Pts
1	Western New York Flash	16	11	3	2	36	17	+19	36
2	Philadelphia Independence	17	11	3	3	30	16	+14	36
3	magicJack	16	8	2	6	26	26	0	25*
4	Sky Blue FC	17	5	4	8	24	27	-3	19
5	Boston Breakers	17	4	4	9	17	24	-7	16
6	Atlanta Beat	17	1	4	12	7	30	-23	7

Source: WPS standings
*magicJack was docked one point on 12 May for various violations of league standards.

== Statistics ==
=== Field players ===
Nat	No.	Player	Pos	GP	GS	Min.	G	A	SHTS	SOG	FC	FS	Booked	Sent off (straight red)
(United States)	1	Katie Schoepfer	MF	6	4	334	0	1	1	1	1	5	0	0
(United States)	2	Kiersten Dallstream	DF	4	4	360	0	0	0	0	2	1	2	0
(United States)	3	Elli Reed	DF	9	7	579	0	1	0	0	4	1	2	0
(United States)	4	Jordan Angeli	DF	11	11	990	0	0	6	1	4	1	0	0
(United States)	5	Amy LePeilbet	DF	5	3	325	1	0	6	2	1	1	0	0
(United States)	5	Liz Bogus	MF	2	0	32	0	0	0	0	0	0	0	0
(United States)	6	Lauren Cheney	FW	5	3	300	3	0	3	1	2	3	0	0
(Australia)	7	Leah Blayney	DF	11	10	880	0	1	9	4	4	5	0	0
(England)	8	Kelly Smith	MF	9	5	540	0	0	3	1	2	3	0	0
(United States)	9	Niki Cross	MF	6	3	253	0	0	4	2	5	0	1	0
(United States)	10	Leslie Osborne	MF	7	5	540	2	0	6	3	15	7	3	0
(United States)	11	Stephanie Cox	DF	4	2	161	0	0	1	1	1	1	0	0
(United States)	12	Rachel Buehler	DF	12	12	1035	2	0	14	3	15	18	0	0
(United States)	14	Meghan Klingenberg	MF	12	12	1080	0	0	1	1	2	1	1	0
(United States)	15	Kasey Moore	MF	3	2	184	0	0	0	0	4	0	2	0
(United States)	16	Kelley O'Hara	FW	7	3	293	4	0	5	2	1	2	0	0
(Scotland)	20	Ifeoma Dieke	FW	6	3	331	0	0	14	10	3	2	0	0
(United States)	21	Keelin Winters	MF	11	7	630	2	1	15	8	2	3	0	0
(England)	23	Alex Scott	DF	11	10	823	0	0	2	1	13	2	2	0
(United States)	24	Claire Zimmeck	FW	7	3	276	0	0	3	1	6	0	3	0
(United States)	38	Taryn Hemmings	MF	2	2	118	0	0	0	0	0	0	0	0
(Japan)	40	Aya Sameshima	DF	11	11	945	0	0	1	1	6	1	0	0

|} Updated to match played August 8, 2011
Source: Boston Breakers

== See also ==
- 2011 Women's Professional Soccer season
- 2011 U.S. Open Cup
- 2011 in American soccer
- Boston Breakers
