= 2013 Seattle Reign FC season =

Women's soccer team season

Seattle Reign FC
2013 season
- Owners: Bill and Teresa Predmore
- General manager: Laura Harvey
- Head coach: Laura Harvey
- Stadium: Starfire Sports
- National Women's Soccer League: Overall: 7th
- Top goalscorer: Megan Rapinoe (5 goals)
- Highest home attendance: 3,855 vs Washington Spirit (July 14, 2013)
- Lowest home attendance: 1,011 vs Washington Spirit (May 16, 2013)
- Average home league attendance: 2,360
Home colors	Away colors

The 2013 Seattle Reign FC season was the club's first season in the National Women's Soccer League, the top division of women's soccer in the United States.

== Background ==
In November 2012, it was confirmed that a Seattle-based women's professional soccer team owned by Bill Predmore (founder and president of Seattle-based digital marketing agency, POP) had been accepted into a new women's professional soccer league, later named National Women's Soccer League. Former general manager of the Seattle Sounders Women and Seattle Sounders FC Director of Youth Programs, Amy Carnell, was named general manager.

On December 21, 2012, the team announced Laura Harvey as their first head coach. Harvey was head coach of Arsenal L.F.C. from 2010–2012 after serving as an assistant for two years, assisted and then coached Birmingham City L.F.C. from 2002–2008, and served as an assistant coach for England's U-17, U-19 and U-23 women's national teams from 2005–2011.

== Review ==
=== Drafts and signings ===
On January 11, 2013, as part of the NWSL Player Allocation, Kaylyn Kyle (CAN), Teresa Noyola (MEX), Megan Rapinoe (USA), Amy Rodriguez (USA), Jenny Ruiz (MEX), Hope Solo (USA), and Emily Zurrer (CAN) were named to the Seattle team. On January 18, the Reign selected Christine Nairn, Mallory Schaffer, Kristen Meier, and Haley Kopmeyer at the 2013 NWSL College Draft. On February 4, 2013, it was announced that the team had signed four free agents: Kate Deines, Jessica Fishlock, Tiffany Cameron, and Lindsay Taylor. During the February 7, 2013 NWSL Supplemental Draft, the team selected Nikki Krzysik, Lauren Barnes, Laura Heyboer, Liz Bogus, Michelle Betos and Kaley Fountain.

=== Preseason ===
Leading into the preseason, it was learned that the Reign would be without all of their U.S. national team allocated players for almost half of the season. National team forward, Amy Rodriguez, announced she was pregnant with her first child and would not be playing during the inaugural season. U.S. national team goalkeeper, Hope Solo, would be away for the first part of the season after recovering from wrist surgery and Megan Rapinoe had signed with French side, Olympique Lyonnais, from January to June and would miss at least nine games.

=== Regular season ===
After traveling to Japan in the preseason to play matches against defending L. League champion INAC Kobe Leonessa, Fukuoka J. Anclas, and Nojima Stella Kanagawa, the Reign faced their first regular season match against the Chicago Red Stars at Benedictine University, in which Seattle's first college draft pick, Christine Nairn, scored the Reign's first goal of the season via a header off an assist from Liz Bogus. The Red Stars later tied the game 1–1, but the point that Seattle earned in the game would be its only for the next nine games. Without the U.S. national team players or a veteran goalscorer up front, the team struggled to win games. Although the losses were for the most part consistently low-scoring games, it was apparent that the Reign was missing some final ingredients for success.

In June 2013, head coach Laura Harvey began making some trades and signing new players. Forward and Canadian international, Tiffany Cameron was waived, later to be picked up by FC Kansas City and former U.S. national team defender, Stephanie Cox was added to the roster. Mexican allocated player and former Stanford Cardinal standout, Teresa Noyola, was traded to FC Kansas City for Renae Cuellar, and Noyola's fellow former Stanford Cardinal goal-scorer, Lindsay Taylor was traded to the Washington Spirit. After a brief stint on the team by Tobagonian international, Kennya Cordner who was later waived and replaced by Australian national team co-captain, Emily van Egmond due to the league's restriction on only having two international players on a team (in addition to allocated players), and the return of U.S. national team players, Solo and Rapinoe, the Reign began to turn the season around with a 1–1 tie against the Western New York Flash. The game would be the first of a six-game undefeated streak for the Reign with two ties and four wins. After losing to regional rival, Portland Thorns FC, 2–1 in the season finale in front of a sold-out crowd of 3,855, the Reign ended the 2013 NWSL season seventh in the league with a 5–14–3 record.

== Club ==
=== Executive staff ===
Owner	(United States) Bill Predmore
General Manager	(England) Laura Harvey

Updated to match played April 8, 2013

=== Coaching staff ===
Position	Staff
Head Coach	(England) Laura Harvey
Assistant Coach	(England) Sam Laity
Goalkeeper Coach	(United States) Ben Dragavon

Last updated: March 7, 2013
Source: http://www.bostonbreakerssoccer.com/ABOUT/COACHING/index_E.html

=== Roster ===
Note: Flags indicate national team as defined under FIFA eligibility rules; some limited exceptions apply. Players may hold more than one non-FIFA nationality.

No.	Pos.	Nation	Player
1	GK	USA	Hope Solo
2	DF	CAN	Emily Zurrer
3	DF	USA	Lauren Barnes
4	DF	USA	Kate Deines
5	FW	USA	Liz Bogus
6	MF	CAN	Kaylyn Kyle
7	DF	USA	Elli Reed
9	DF	USA	Stephanie Cox
10	MF	WAL	Jessica Fishlock
11	MF	USA	Keelin Winters (captain)

No.	Pos.	Nation	Player
13	DF	MEX	Jenny Ruiz
14	MF	USA	Kristina Larsen
15	MF	USA	Megan Rapinoe
18	GK	USA	Michelle Betos
19	MF	USA	Christine Nairn
20	MF	AUS	Emily van Egmond
21	MF	USA	Kristen Meier
22	FW	USA	Jessica McDonald
23	FW	MEX	Renae Cuellar
25	DF	USA	Kiersten Dallstream

== Competitions ==
Win Tie Loss

=== Preseason and friendlies ===
March 16, 2013	INAC Kobe Leonessa	2–0	Seattle Reign FC	Okinawa, Japan
20:30 PST		Report		Stadium: Koza General Sports Park Athletics Stadium

March 19, 2013	Fukuoka J. Anclas	1–3	Seattle Reign FC	Fukuoka, Japan
22:00 PST		Report	Laura Heyboer; Marissa Mykines; Liz Bogus	Stadium: Fukuoka Level 5 Stadium

March 23, 2013	Nojima Stella Kanagawa	0–4	Seattle Reign FC	Tokyo, Japan
17:00 PST		Report	Tiffany Cameron 31'; Kaylyn Kyle 40'; Emily Zurrer; Kristen Meier 75'	Stadium: Nojima Football Park

June 2, 2013	Seattle Reign FC	6–0	Haiti	Tukwila, Washington
15:30 PT	Taylor 54' (pen.), 64', 71'; Cordner 75'; Bogus 84'; Larsen 89'	Report		Stadium: Starfire Stadium; Referee: Katja Koroleva

=== Regular season ===
April 14, 2013 1	Chicago Red Stars	1–1	Seattle Reign FC	Lisle, Illinois
17:00 (PST)	Chalupny 19'	Report	Nairn 10'	Stadium: Village of Lisle-Benedictine University Sports Complex

April 21, 2013 2	Portland Thorns FC	2–1	Seattle Reign FC	Portland, Oregon
14:00 (PST)	Dougherty 45'; Alex Morgan 52'	Report	Fishlock 74'	Stadium: Jeld-Wen Field; Attendance: 16,479; Referee: Josh Wilkens

April 26, 2013 3	FC Kansas City	2–0	Seattle Reign FC	Overland Park, Kansas
19:35 (PST)	Farrelly 21'; Cuellar 71'	Report		Stadium: Shawnee Mission District Stadium; Attendance: 4,064; Referee: Christina Unkel

May 4, 2013 4	Seattle Reign FC	0–1	FC Kansas City	Tukwila, Washington
20:00 (PST)		Report	Cuellar 69'	Stadium: Starfire Stadium; Attendance: 2,618; Referee: Margaret Domka

May 11, 2013 5	Sky Blue FC	2–0	Seattle Reign FC	Piscataway, New Jersey
15:00 (PST)	Danesha Adams 31'; Lisa De Vanna 35'	Report		Stadium: Yurcak Field; Attendance: 1,459; Referee: Steve Montanino

May 16, 2013 6	Seattle Reign FC	2–4	Washington Spirit	Tukwila, Washington
19:00 (PST)	Lindsay Taylor 7'; Teresa Noyola 47'	Report	Diana Matheson 37' Ali Krieger 41'; Tiffany McCarty 56' Tori Huster 84'	Stadium: Starfire Stadium; Attendance: 1,011; Referee: Katja Koroleva

May 19, 2013 7	Seattle Reign FC	0–3	Sky Blue FC	Tukwila, Washington
18:00 (PST)	Ruiz (yellow card) 25' (red card) 63'; Kyle (yellow card) 40'	Report	De Vanna 9'; Schmidt 78'; Lytle 86'; Bock (yellow card) 66'; De Vanna (yellow card) 70'	Stadium: Starfire Stadium; Attendance: 1,046; Referee: Kari Seitz

May 25, 2013 8	Seattle Reign FC	0–1	Portland Thorns FC	Tukwila, Washington
19:00 (PST)		Report	Christine Sinclair 83' PK	Stadium: Starfire Stadium; Attendance: 3,324; Referee: Margaret Domka

June 9, 2013 9	Seattle Reign FC	0–1	FC Kansas City	Tukwila, Washington
19:00 (PST)		Report	Erika Tymrak 63'	Stadium: Starfire Stadium; Attendance: 1,377; Referee: Kara Honthumb

June 16, 2013 10	Portland Thorns FC	2–0	Seattle Reign FC	Portland, Oregon
19:30 (PST)	Danielle Foxhoven 48'; Meleana Shim 67'	Report		Stadium: Jeld-Wen Field; Attendance: 13,802; Referee: Robert Sigiba

June 23, 2013 11	Western New York Flash	1–1	Seattle Reign FC	Rochester, New York
16:05 (PST)	Winters 28'	Report	Wambach 56' PK	Stadium: Sahlen's Stadium; Attendance: 6,347; Referee: Miguel Panduro

June 26, 2013 12	Boston Breakers	1–2	Seattle Reign FC	Somerville, Massachusetts
19:00 (PST)	Nogueira 50'	Report	Fishlock 77'; Nairn 85'	Stadium: Dilboy Stadium; Attendance: 2,012; Referee: John McCloskey

June 29, 2013 13	Seattle Reign FC	3–1	Chicago Red Stars	Tukwila, Washington
20:00 (PST)	Kyle 51'Fishlock 58'; Rapinoe 93+'	Report	Wenino 85'	Stadium: Starfire Stadium; Attendance: 2,138; Referee: Josh Wilkens

July 3, 2013 14	Seattle Reign FC	1–1	Boston Breakers	Tukwila, Washington
19:00 (PST)	McDonald 54'	Report	Leroux 63'	Stadium: Starfire Stadium; Attendance: 1,430; Referee: Miguel Panduro

July 11, 2013 15	Seattle Reign FC	3–2	Western New York Flash	Tukwila, Washington
14:00 (PST)	Fishlock 14'; Rapinoe 44'; Nairn 82'	Report	Wambach 10, 47'	Stadium: Starfire Stadium; Attendance: 2,514; Referee: Robert Sibiga

July 14, 2013 16	Seattle Reign FC	2–1	Washington Spirit	Tukwila, Washington
19:00 (PST)	McDonald 30, 34'	Report	Matheson 11'	Stadium: Starfire Stadium; Attendance: 3,855; Referee: Katja Koroleva

July 20, 2013 17	FC Kansas City	2–0	Seattle Reign FC	Overland Park, Kansas
19:35 (PST)	Holiday 39'; Tymrak 86'	Report		Stadium: Shawnee Mission District Stadium; Attendance: 5,271; Referee: Boris Senic

July 25, 2013 18	Seattle Reign FC	4–1	Chicago Red Stars	Tukwila, Washington
19:00 (PST)	Rapinoe 6, 68'; Kyle 24'; Bogus 83'	Report	Hoy 74'	Stadium: Starfire Stadium; Attendance: 2,017; Referee: Robert Sibiga

August 3, 2013 19	Chicago Red Stars	3–1	Seattle Reign FC	Lisle, Illinois
18:00 (PST)	Fuss 11' (pen.); Grings 41, 72'	Report	Kyle 28' (pen.)	Stadium: Sports Complex at Benedictine University; Attendance: 3,400; Referee: Kara Honthumb

August 7, 2013 20	Western New York Flash	1–0	Seattle Reign FC	Rochester, New York
19:05 (PST)	Lloyd 54'	Report		Stadium: Sahlen's Stadium; Attendance: 4,993; Referee: Robert Sibiga

August 10, 2013 21	Washington Spirit	1–0	Seattle Reign FC	Boyds, Maryland
16:35 (PST)	Matheson 83'	Report		Stadium: Maryland SoccerPlex; Attendance: 4,549; Referee: Kari Seitz

August 17, 2013 22	Seattle Reign FC	1–2	Portland Thorns FC	Tukwila, Washington
20:00 (PST)	Rapinoe 3'	Report	Sinclair 8, 83'	Stadium: Starfire Stadium; Attendance: 3,855; Referee: Christina Unkel

==== Standings ====
Pos	Team	Pld	W	D	L	GF	GA	GD	Pts	Qualification
1	Western New York Flash	22	10	8	4	36	20	+16	38	NWSL Shield
2	FC Kansas City	22	11	5	6	34	22	+12	38	NWSL Playoffs
3	Portland Thorns FC (C)	22	11	5	6	32	25	+7	38	NWSL Playoffs
4	Sky Blue FC	22	10	6	6	31	26	+5	36	NWSL Playoffs
5	Boston Breakers	22	8	6	8	35	34	+1	30	
6	Chicago Red Stars	22	8	6	8	32	36	−4	30	
7	Seattle Reign FC	22	5	3	14	22	36	−14	18	
8	Washington Spirit	22	3	5	14	16	39	−23	14	

Source: soccerway.com
Rules for classification: Tiebreakers
(C) Champions

==== Results summary ====
Overall								Home						Away					
Pld	Pts	W	L	T	GF	GA	GD	W	L	T	GF	GA	GD	W	L	T	GF	GA	GD
22	18	5	14	3	22	36	−14	4	6	1	15	16	−1	1	8	2	7	20	−13

Last updated: August 18, 2013
Source: http://www.nwslsoccer.com/Stats/index_E.html
Pld = Matches played; Pts = Points; W = Matches won; T = Matches tied; L = Matches lost; GF = Goals for; GA = Goals against; GD = Goal difference

==== Results by round ====
Round	1	2	3	4	5	6	7	8	9	10	11	12	13	14	15	16	17	18	19	20	21	22
Stadium	A	A	A	H	A	H	H	H	H	A	A	A	H	H	H	H	A	H	A	A	A	H
Result	D	L	L	L	L	L	L	L	L	L	D	W	W	D	W	W	L	W	L	L	L	L

Updated to match(es) played on August 18, 2013. Source: nwslsoccer.com
A = Away; H = Home; W = Win; D = Draw; L = Loss

== Statistics ==
=== Appearances and goals ===
As of August 20, 2013

No.	Pos	Nat	Player	Total		NWSL	
No.	Pos	Nat	Player	Apps	Goals	Apps	Goals
3	DF	(United States) USA	Lauren Barnes	22	0	22	0
18	GK	(United States) USA	Michelle Betos	7	0	7	0
5	FW	(United States) USA	Liz Bogus	20	1	20	1
9	FW	(Canada) CAN	Tiffany Cameron	7	0	7	0
26	FW	(Trinidad and Tobago) TRI	Kennya Cordner	3	0	3	0
9	DF	(United States) USA	Stephanie Cox	4	0	4	0
23	FW	(Mexico) MEX	Renae Cuellar	7	0	7	0
25	DF	(United States) USA	Kiersten Dallstream	20	0	20	0
4	DF	(United States) USA	Kate Deines	17	0	17	0
10	MF	(Wales) WAL	Jessica Fishlock	21	4	21	4
20	GK	(United States) USA	Haley Kopmeyer	1	0	1	0
6	MF	(Canada) CAN	Kaylyn Kyle	21	3	21	3
14	FW	(United States) USA	Kristina Larsen	9	0	9	0
21	MF	(United States) USA	Kristen Meier	6	0	6	0
21	FW	(United States) USA	Jessica McDonald	7	3	7	3
19	MF	(United States) USA	Christine Nairn	22	3	22	3
8	MF	(Mexico) MEX	Teresa Noyola	11	1	11	1
16	MF	(United States) USA	Lyndsey Patterson	3	0	3	0
15	MF	(United States) USA	Megan Rapinoe	12	5	12	5
7	DF	(United States) USA	Elli Reed	17	0	17	0
13	MF	(Mexico) MEX	Jenny Ruiz	7	0	7	0
1	GK	(United States) USA	Hope Solo	14	0	14	0
17	FW	(United States) USA	Lindsay Taylor	6	1	6	1
20	MF	(Australia) AUS	Emily van Egmond	6	0	6	0
11	MF	(United States) USA	Keelin Winters	21	1	21	1
2	DF	(Canada) CAN	Emily Zurrer	7	0	7	0

==== Top scorers ====
Players with one goal or more included only.

As of August 20, 2013

Rk.	Nat	Pos	Player	Total	NWSL
1	(United States)	MF	Megan Rapinoe	5	5
2	(Wales)	MF	Jessica Fishlock	4	4
3	(United States)	FW	Jessica McDonald	3	3
3	(United States)	MF	Christine Nairn	3	3
3	(Canada)	DF	Kaylyn Kyle	3	3
4	(United States)	FW	Liz Bogus	1	1
4	(Mexico)	MF	Teresa Noyola	1	1
4	(United States)	FW	Lindsay Taylor	1	1
4	(United States)	MF	Keelin Winters	1	1

==== Top assists ====
Players with one assist or more included only.

As of August 20, 2013

Rk.	Nat	Pos	Player	Total	NWSL
1	(United States)	MF	Christine Nairn	5	5
2	(United States)	FW	Liz Bogus	2	2
2	(United States)	DF	Elli Reed	2	2
3	(United States)	FW	Kristina Larsen	1	1
3	(United States)	FW	Jessica McDonald	1	1
3	(Mexico)	MF	Teresa Noyola	1	1
3	(United States)	MF	Keelin Winters	1	1

==== Disciplinary record ====
Players with 1 card or more included only.

As of August 20, 2013

No.	Nat	Pos	Player	Total		NWSL	
No.	Nat	Pos	Player	Booked	Sent off (straight red)	Booked	Sent off (straight red)
23	(Mexico)	FW	Renae Cuellar	1	0	1	0
25	(United States)	DF	Kiersten Dallstream	0	1	0	1
7	(Wales)	MF	Jessica Fishlock	4	0	4	0
10	(Canada)	MF	Kaylyn Kyle	4	0	4	0
19	(United States)	MF	Christine Nairn	2	0	1	0
14	(United States)	FW	Kristina Larsen	1	0	1	0
19	(United States)	MF	Megan Rapinoe	1	0	1	0
16	(United States)	MF	Elli Reed	2	0	2	0
13	(Mexico)	DF	Jenny Ruiz	0	1	0	1
1	(United States)	GK	Hope Solo	1	0	1	0
1	(Australia)	MF	Emily van Egmond	1	0	1	0
1	(United States)	MF	Keelin Winters	1	0	1	0
2	(Canada)	DF	Emily Zurrer	1	0	1	0

==== Goalkeeper stats ====
Last updated: August 20, 2013

No.	Nat	Player	National Women's Soccer League			
No.	Nat	Player	MIN	GA	GAA	SV
18	(United States)	Michelle Betos	630	14	2	34
20	(United States)	Haley Kopmeyer	90	3	3	6
1	(United States)	Hope Solo	1260	19	1.357	81

== Player Transactions ==
=== Transfers In ===
Date	Player	Pos	Previous club	Notes	Ref
March 1, 2013	(United States) Keelin Winters	MF	Chicago Red Stars	Traded for first round pick in the 2014 College Draft and future considerations	
June 19, 2013	(United States) Stephanie Cox	DF	–	Signed mid-season	
June 28, 2013	(United States) Jessica McDonald	FW	Chicago Red Stars	Acquired via waivers	
July 1, 2013	(Mexico) Renae Cuellar	FW	FC Kansas City	Traded for Teresa Noyola, rights for unsigned player Nikki Krzysik, and second round 2014 NWSL college draft pick	
July 12, 2013	(Australia) Emily van Egmond	MF	Newcastle Jets FC	Signed; Kennya Cordner waived due to international player restrictions in league	

=== Transfers Out ===
Date	Player	Pos	Destination Club	Notes	Ref
June 25, 2013	(Canada) Tiffany Cameron	FW	FC Kansas City	Waived, later picked up by Kansas City	
June 28, 2013	(United States) Haley Kopmeyer	GK	–	Waived to make room for Jessica McDonald	
July 1, 2013	(Mexico) Teresa Noyola	MF	FC Kansas City	Traded for Renae Cuellar	
July 1, 2013	(United States) Lindsay Taylor	FW	Washington Spirit	Traded to Washington for conditional fourth round pick in exchange for the Spirit’s second round pick.	
July 12, 2013	(Trinidad and Tobago) Kennya Cordner	FW		Kennya Cordner waived due to international player restrictions in league when Emily van Egmond signed.	

== Honors and awards ==
=== NWSL Player of the Week ===
Week	Player	Ref
2	Jessica Fishlock	
16	Megan Rapinoe	

=== Reign FC Player of the Match ===
Date	Player	Ref
November 7, 2013	Christine Nairn	
July 14, 2013	Jessica McDonald	
July 25, 2013	Kaylyn Kyle	
August 16, 2013	Megan Rapinoe	

== See also ==
- 2013 National Women's Soccer League season
