= 2006 CONCACAF Women's U-20 Championship =

Tournament details
- Host country: Mexico
- Dates: 18–27 January
- Teams: 8 (from 1 confederation)
- Venue: 2 (in 2 host cities)

Final positions
- Champions: United States (1st title)
- Runners-up: Canada
- Third place: Mexico
- Fourth place: Jamaica

Tournament statistics
- Matches played: 16
- Goals scored: 81 (5.06 per match)
- Attendance: 28,065 (1,754 per match)
- Top scorer(s): (Mexico) Charlyn Corral (8 goals)

The 2006 CONCACAF Women's U-20 Championship was the 3rd edition of the CONCACAF Women's U-20 Championship, the biennial international youth football championship organised by CONCACAF for the women's under-20 national teams of the North, Central American and Caribbean region. The top three sides also earned qualification to the 2006 FIFA U-20 Women's World Championship.

The tournament was held between 18 and 27 January 2006. It featured eight teams and was played at the Estadio Luis "Pirata" Fuente (Veracruz) and the Estadio Rafael Murillo Vidal (Córdoba) in Mexico. The tournament was won by the United States, who defeated Canada in the final by a score of 3–2. Mexico secured the final qualification spot by defeating Jamaica in the third-place match.

== Group stage ==
=== Group A ===
| Team | Pts | Pld | W | D | L | GF | GA | GD |
|---|---|---|---|---|---|---|---|---|
| Canada | 9 | 3 | 3 | 0 | 0 | 16 | 3 | 13 |
| Mexico | 6 | 3 | 2 | 0 | 1 | 14 | 3 | 11 |
| Trinidad and Tobago | 3 | 3 | 1 | 0 | 2 | 4 | 10 | −6 |
| Panama | 0 | 3 | 0 | 0 | 3 | 1 | 19 | −18 |

18 January 2006

| Canada | 7–1 | Trinidad and Tobago |
|---|---|---|
| Collison 17'; Maranda 24'; Jamani 29'; Robinson 36'; Kyle 78'; Sleiman 82', 90+' | Report | Douglas 59' (pen.) |

Estadio Luis "Pirata" Fuente, Veracruz
Attendance: 350
Referee: Arlene Troya (Panama)

18 January 2006

| Mexico | 10–0 | Panama |
|---|---|---|
| Corral 18', 36', 55', 60'; Nieva 30', 72'; Ocampo 54'; Mendoza 74'; Morales 79'; Valdez 85' | Report |

Estadio Luis "Pirata" Fuente, Veracruz
Attendance: 1,000
Referee: Dianne Ferreira-James (Guyana)

20 January 2006

| Panama | 0–6 | Canada |
|---|---|---|
| | Report | Jamani 8', 48'; Robinson 18', 62', 68'; Hingwing 28' |

Estadio Luis "Pirata" Fuente, Veracruz
Attendance: 800
Referee: Dianne Ferreira-James (Guyana)

20 January 2006

| Mexico | 2–0 | Trinidad and Tobago |
|---|---|---|
| Morales 9'; Corral 18' | Report |

Estadio Luis "Pirata" Fuente, Veracruz
Attendance: 4,500
Referee: Sandra Serafini (United States)

22 January 2006

| Trinidad and Tobago | 3–1 | Panama |
|---|---|---|
| Atthin-Johnson 6', 45', 69' | Report | Rodriguez 80' |

Estadio Luis "Pirata" Fuente, Veracruz
Attendance: 300
Referee: Sandra Serafini (United States)

22 January 2006

| Mexico | 2–3 | Canada |
|---|---|---|
| Ocampo 23' (pen.); Corral 79' | Report | Lang 1'; Schmidt 17', 48' |

Estadio Luis "Pirata" Fuente, Veracruz
Attendance: 4,000
Referee: Dianne Ferreira-James (Guyana)

=== Group B ===
| Team | Pts | Pld | W | D | L | GF | GA | GD |
|---|---|---|---|---|---|---|---|---|
| United States | 9 | 3 | 3 | 0 | 0 | 13 | 1 | 12 |
| Jamaica | 6 | 3 | 2 | 0 | 1 | 13 | 5 | 8 |
| El Salvador | 3 | 3 | 1 | 0 | 2 | 4 | 8 | −4 |
| Suriname | 0 | 3 | 0 | 0 | 3 | 0 | 16 | −16 |

19 January 2006

| El Salvador | 3–0 | Suriname |
|---|---|---|
| Cardona 37', 63'; Campos 72' | Report |

Estadio Rafael Murillo Vidal, Córdoba
Attendance: 1,500
Referee: Quetzalli Alvarado (Mexico)

19 January 2006

| United States | 4–1 | Jamaica |
|---|---|---|
| DiMartino 38'; Rodriguez 45+'; Cheney 70', 80' | Report | Soman 75' |

Estadio Rafael Murillo Vidal, Córdoba
Attendance: 2,200
Referee: Shane DeSilva (Trinidad and Tobago)

21 January 2006

| Jamaica | 3–1 | El Salvador |
|---|---|---|
| K. Reid 51'; Davis 53'; Parker 56' | Report | Campos 71' |

Estadio Rafael Murillo Vidal, Córdoba
Attendance: 500
Referee: Arlene Troya (Panama)

21 January 2006

| Suriname | 0–4 | United States |
|---|---|---|
| | Report | Rodriguez 6'; Long 25'; Poach 54'; O'Hara 63' |

Estadio Rafael Murillo Vidal, Córdoba
Attendance: 1,500
Referee: Verónica Brito (Mexico)

23 January 2006

| Jamaica | 9–0 | Suriname |
|---|---|---|
| Duncan 15'; Djarksi 30' (o.g.); K. Reid 32', 80'; Parker 36', 78'; V. Reid 37', 53', 90' | Report |

Estadio Rafael Murillo Vidal, Córdoba
Attendance: 700
Referee: Verónica Brito (Mexico)

23 January 2006

| United States | 5–0 | El Salvador |
|---|---|---|
| Cheney 28', 31'; Dew 43'; Rostedt 58', 78' | Report |

Estadio Rafael Murillo Vidal, Córdoba
Attendance: 2,500
Referee: Shane DeSilva (Trinidad and Tobago)

== Knockout stage ==
=== Semi-finals ===
25 January 2006

| Canada | 2–1 | Jamaica |
|---|---|---|
| Iacchelli 45'; Collison 71' | Report | Parker 65' |

Estadio Luis "Pirata" Fuente, Veracruz
Attendance: 2,000
Referee: Arlene Troya (Panama)

25 January 2006

| United States | 3–0 | Mexico |
|---|---|---|
| Bock 21', 71'; Rodriguez 59' | Report |

Estadio Luis "Pirata" Fuente, Veracruz
Attendance: 3,141
Referee: Wálter Quesada (Costa Rica)

=== 3rd Place ===
27 January 2006

| Mexico | 4–1 | Jamaica |
|---|---|---|
| Murray 19' (o.g.); Gandarilla 47'; Corral 68' (pen.), 90' | Report | V. Reid 33' |

Estadio Luis "Pirata" Fuente, Veracruz
Attendance: 1,537
Referee: Dianne Ferreira-James (Guyana)

=== Final ===
27 January 2006

| Canada | 2–3 | United States |
|---|---|---|
| Jamani 56'; Robinson 60' | Report | Rodriguez 8'; Rostedt 72'; Cheney 81' |

Estadio Luis "Pirata" Fuente, Veracruz
Attendance: 1,537
Referee: Shane DeSilva (Trinidad and Tobago)

== Winners ==
2006 CONCACAF Women's U-20 Championship winners

United States
First title

== Goalscorers ==
There were 81 goals scored in 16 matches, for an average of 5.06 goals per match.

8 goals

- (Mexico) Charlyn Corral

5 goals

- (United States) Lauren Cheney
- (Canada) Jodi-Ann Robinson

4 goals

- (Canada) Aysha Jamani
- (Jamaica) Kimmia Parker
- (Jamaica) Venicia Reid
- (United States) Amy Rodriguez

3 goals

- (Trinidad and Tobago) Maylee Atthin-Johnson
- (Jamaica) Kenesha Reid
- (United States) Jessica Rostedt

2 goals

- (United States) Brittany Bock
- (El Salvador) Patricia Campos
- (El Salvador) Patricia Cardona
- (Canada) Lisa Collison
- (Mexico) Tania Morales
- (Mexico) Christine Nieva
- (Mexico) Mónica Ocampo
- (Canada) Sophie Schmidt
- (Canada) Rheanne Sleiman

1 goal

- (Jamaica) Omolyn Davis
- (United States) Carrie Dew
- (United States) Tina DiMartino
- (Trinidad and Tobago) Aveann Douglas
- (Jamaica) Shakira Duncan
- (Mexico) Nancy Gandarilla
- (Canada) Eden Hingwing
- (Canada) Selenia Iacchelli
- (Canada) Kaylyn Kyle
- (Canada) Kara Lang
- (United States) Allie Long
- (Canada) Véronique Maranda
- (Mexico) Rebecca Mendoza
- (United States) Kelley O'Hara
- (United States) Amanda Poach
- (Panama) Joan Rodriguez
- (Jamaica) Peta-Gaye Soman
- (Mexico) Isabel Valdez

1 own goal

- (Suriname) Roxane Djarksi
- (Jamaica) Christina Murray

Source: CONCACAF

== Qualified teams for FIFA U-20 Women's World Championship ==
| Team | Qualified on | Previous appearances in FIFA U-20 Women's World Championship^{1} |
|---|---|---|
| United States | 25 January 2006 | 2 (**2002**, 2004) |
| Canada | 25 January 2006 | 2 (2002, 2004) |
| Mexico | 27 January 2006 | 1 (2002) |

^{1} Bold indicates champions for that year. Italic indicates hosts for that year.
