= José Jaikel =

Costa Rican footballer (born 1966)

Personal information
- Full name: José Antonio Jaikel Aguilar
- Date of birth: 3 April 1966 (age 60)
- Place of birth: Alajuela, Costa Rica
- Height: 1.80 m (5 ft 11 in)
- Position: Forward

Senior career*
Years	Team	Apps	(Gls)
1986–1993	Saprissa		
1994	Herediano	11	(4)

International career
1990–1994	Costa Rica	5	(2)
- * Club domestic league appearances and goals

José Antonio Jaikel Aguilar (born 3 April 1966) is a Costa Rican former football player who played most of his career with Deportivo Saprissa, during the 1980s and 1990s.

== Club career ==
Nicknamed El Tanque, because of his strength and build, the striker won several national championships with Saprissa, as well as one CONCACAF Champions Cups. He also played with Herediano, before retiring at only 28 years of age.

== International career ==
He was part of the Costa Rica national football team that played in the 1990 FIFA World Cup held in Italy, but didn't have any actual playing time.

His final international was a January 1994 friendly match against Norway.

=== International goals ===
Scores and results list Costa Rica's goal tally first.

N.	Date	Venue	Opponent	Score	Result	Competition
1.	23 September 1993	Prince Mohamed bin Fahd Stadium, Dammam, Saudi Arabia	Saudi Arabia	1–1	2–1	Friendly match
2.	23 September 1993	Prince Mohamed bin Fahd Stadium, Dammam, Saudi Arabia	Saudi Arabia	2–1	2–1	Friendly match

== Business career ==
After retiring as a player, he completed his studies industrial engineering at the Latin American University of Science and Technology. He is currently General Director for Central America at Gruma (Grupo Maseca), a food production company.
