= Kristina Larsen =

Kristina Larsen may refer to:

- Kristina Larsen (rower) (born 1978), Australian rower
- Kristina Larsen (soccer) (born 1988), American professional soccer player
