= Fahad Abdulrahman =

Emirati footballer (born 1962)

Personal information
- Full name: Fahad Abdulrahman Abdullah
- Date of birth: 10 October 1962 (age 64)
- Place of birth: Trucial States

International career
Years	Team	Apps	(Gls)
	United Arab Emirates	27	(1)

Fahad Abdulrahman Abdullah (Arabic: فَهْد عَبْد الرَّحْمٰن عَبْد الله) (born 10 October 1962) is a UAE football (soccer) player who played as a midfielder for the UAE national football team and Al Wasl FC Club in Dubai.
