= Liz Bogus =

American soccer player (born 1984)

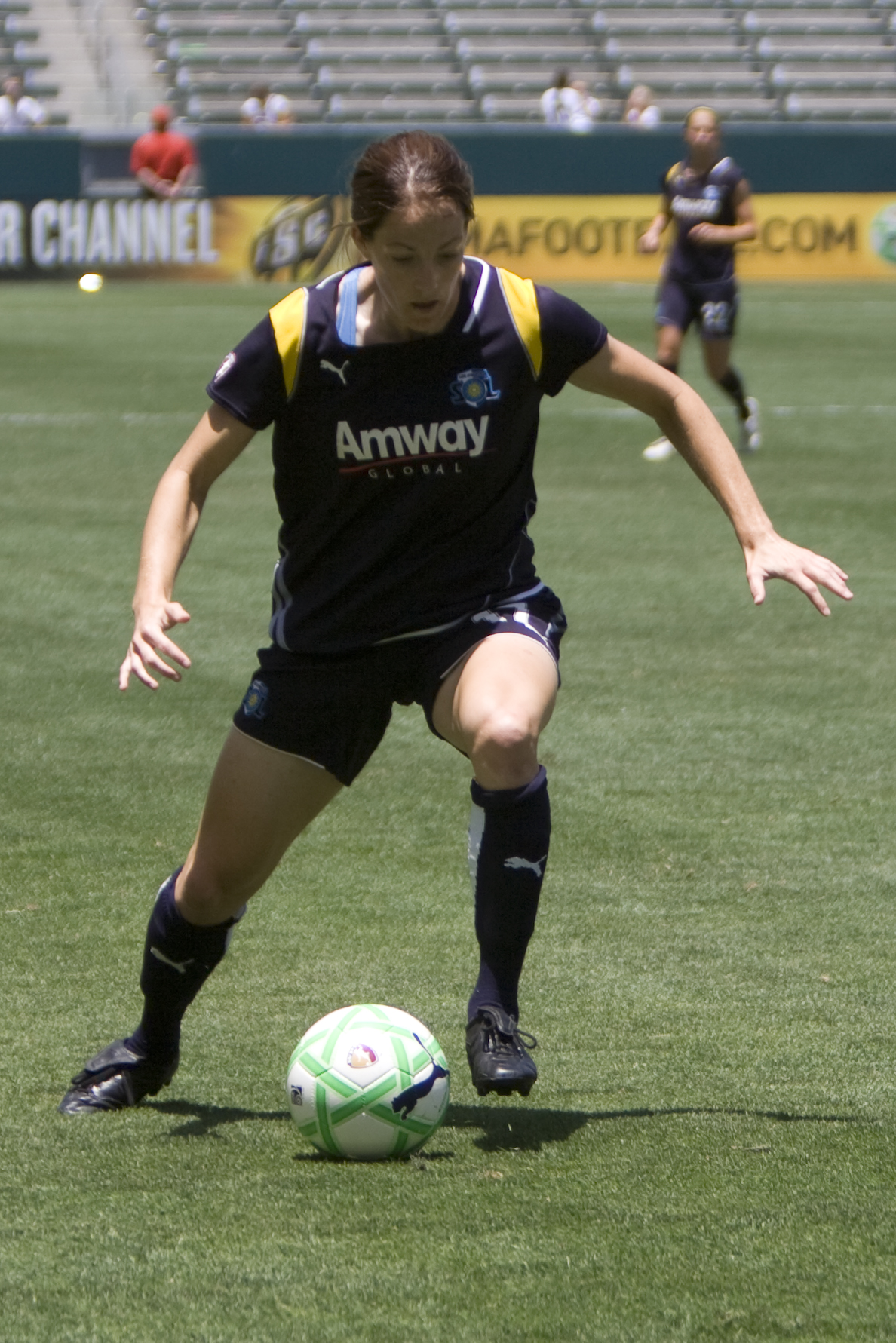
- Bogus playing with Los Angeles in 2009

Personal information
- Full name: Elizabeth Ely Bogus
- Date of birth: February 24, 1984 (age 42)
- Place of birth: Provo, Utah, United States
- Height: 5 ft 6 in (1.68 m)
- Positions: Midfielder; forward

Youth career
- 1995–1997: Sparta United SC
- 1997–1998: Utah FC
- 1998–2001: Firebirds SC
- 2004: Chicago Eclipse Select

College career
Years	Team	Apps	(Gls)
2002–2005	Arizona State Sun Devils	81	(31)

Senior career*
Years	Team	Apps	(Gls)
2004	Chicago Cobras	11	(14)
2005	Arizona Heatwave	11	(7)
2006	Ajax America Women		
2007	Mile High Edge	11	(1)
2008	Pali Blues	9	(5)
2009	Los Angeles Sol	7	(0)
2009	→ Ajax America Women (loan)	3	(1)
2010–2011	Boston Breakers	22	(3)
2010	→ Boston Aztec (loan)	2	(1)
2012	Pali Blues	9	(4)
2012	PK-35 Vantaa	5	(2)
2013	Seattle Reign	20	(1)
2014–2015	FC Kansas City	31	(4)
Total		141+	(43+)

International career
2003–2006	United States U21		
- * Club domestic league appearances and goals

Elizabeth Ely Bogus (born February 24, 1984) is an American soccer coach and retired player who played as a midfielder and forward. She played semi-professionally with Chicago Cobras, Arizona Heatwave, Ajax America Women, Mile High Edge, Pali Blues, and Boston Aztec; at the professional level, she appeared for Los Angeles Sol, Boston Breakers, PK-35 Vantaa, Seattle Reign, and FC Kansas City.

== Early life ==
Born in Provo, Utah, Bogus began playing soccer when she was eight years old. She attended Brighton High School in Cottonwood Heights. With the Bengals, she set records with 79 career goals and 27 assists and earned three UHSAA all-state first team selections; Bogus was named all-state second team as a freshman. As a senior, she was named the Utah High School Player of the Year by Gatorade and the National Soccer Coaches Association of America and was also honored as an honorable mention all-American by the United States Specialty Sports Association.

At the club level, Bogus played with Sparta United SC for two seasons, Utah FC for one, and Firebirds SC for three. Bogus additionally played with the Utah Olympic Development Program (ODP) team for four years and was on the Region IV ODP team for one season. She committed to play college soccer for coach Ray Leone at Arizona State University, part of a recruiting class that also included Manya Makoski.

== College and amateur ==
Bogus attended Arizona State University in Tempe, Arizona. She made an immediate mark on the team her freshman year, when she was named Pac-10 Freshman of the Year. Bogus led the conference in game-winning goals with seven, which tied the school record for a single season. She ranked third in shots (62) and goals (10) and had three assists. She was named to the 2002 All-Pac-10 First Team and Soccer America Magazine's Freshman All-America Team. She was one of 12 finalists for Soccer Buzz Magazine's 2002 National Freshman of the Year.

During her sophomore year, Bogus scored six goals and provided four assists, earning honorable mention accolades from the PAC. In 2004, Bogus scored four goals, including two game winners, and had a team-high five assists. She made the All-conference second team. As senior, Bogus scored 11 goals, including two game winners, and six assists. She received honors from the Pac-10, making the all-conference first team. SoccerBuzz and ESPN The Magazine both named Bogus to first teams in the West. Bogus finished her career at ASU ranked second in goals (31) and points (80) and third for game-winning goals (12) and assists (18).

=== Semi-pro leagues, 2004–2008 ===
Bogus played on many semi-professional teams before being drafted by FC Gold Pride in the 2008 WPS General Draft. She moved to Los Angeles before the final rosters were announced.

== Professional career ==
=== The WPS years, 2009–2011 ===
Los Angeles Sol signed Bogus off waivers for the 2009 season and she appeared in seven games for the club.

In 2010, Bogus was signed as a developmental player by the Boston Breakers and spent the next two seasons playing with the Boston Aztec and the Breakers. She scored three goals and provided one assist in two WPS seasons.

=== Seattle Reign ===
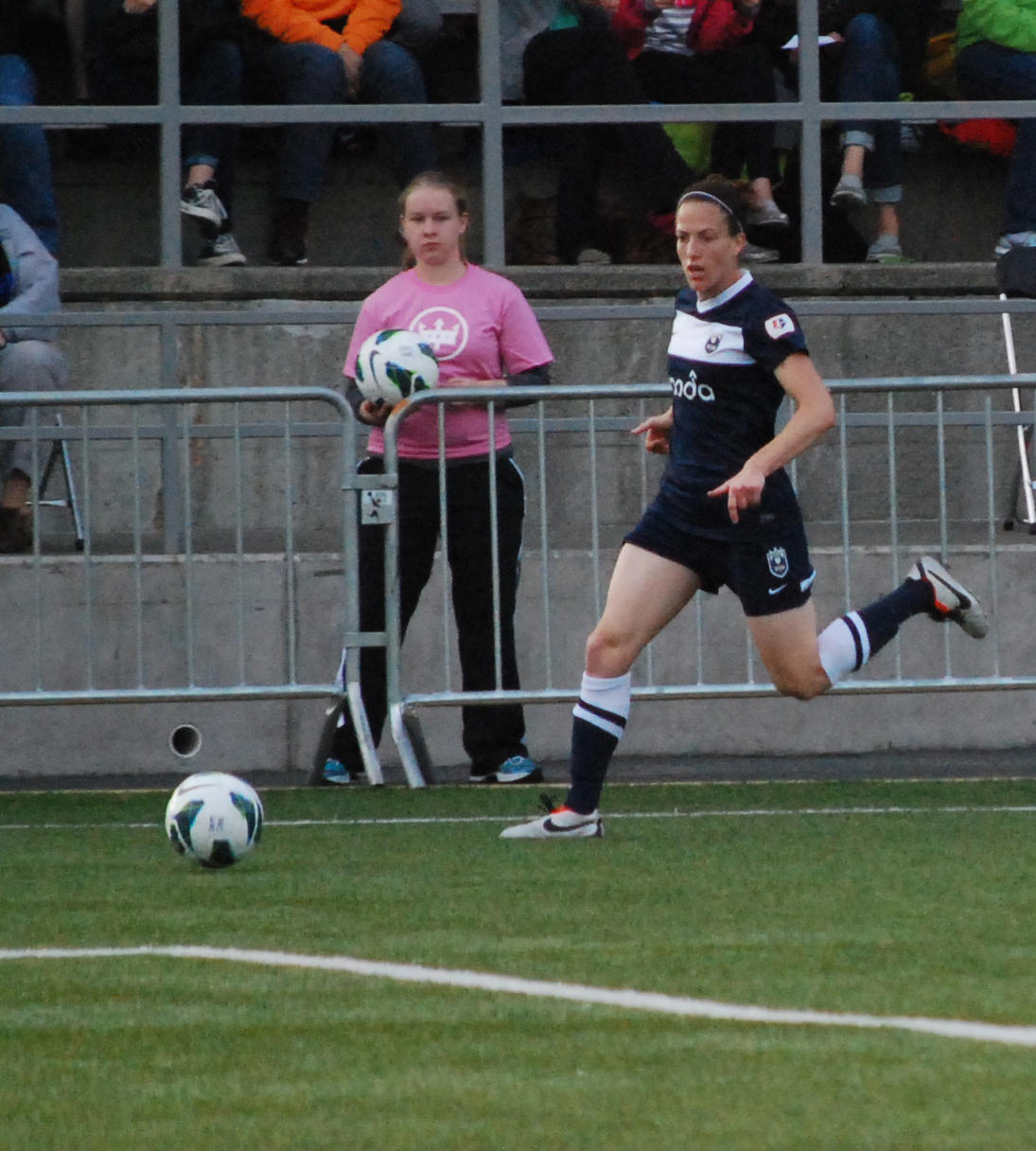
Bogus made 20 appearances during her lone season in Seattle.

On February 7, 2013, Bogus was picked by Seattle Reign FC in the fourth round of the 2013 NWSL Supplemental Draft. During the team's first regular season match against the Chicago Red Stars, Bogus provided the assist on the team's first goal by Christine Nairn. Of the assist, Nairn said, "I had the easy job. If Liz didn't put a perfect ball on my head, I wouldn't have been in the position that I was in." During a home match on July 26, 2013, Bogus scored a goal in the 83rd minute helping the Reign defeat the Chicago Red Stars 4–1. She made 19 appearances for the Reign during the 2013 season, serving two assists and one goal.

On December 5, 2013, it was announced that Bogus had been traded to FC Kansas City for the 2014 season. Of the trade, Reign FC head coach Laura Harvey said, "Liz was a huge part of our group last season and she will be missed...but when we looked at the upcoming season in the context of the changes we have planned, we feared her playing time could be limited. As a result, we felt the trade with Kansas City would be best for all involved."

=== FC Kansas City ===
After winning the NWSL championship with FC Kansas City in 2014 and 2015, Bogus announced her retirement from professional soccer on March 1, 2016.

== International career ==
During her freshman year at Arizona State, Bogus was called up for the first time by the United States women's national under-21 soccer team. She spent just "a brief stint" with the team that year and was not called back up until her senior year. In the spring of 2006, Bogus was named to a squad for a three-match tour in Europe, alongside her Sun Devil teammate Manya Makoski. The camp included two unofficial games, against SV Saestum and FCR 2001 Duisburg, and a friendly against the Netherlands.

== Coaching career ==
On January 30, 2017, the University of Utah announced that Bogus would be joining the school as an assistant coach.

== Personal life ==
Bogus majored in business communications at Arizona State, graduating from the W. P. Carey School of Business. Her father, Tom, was a soccer player at BYU and her mother, Brooke Adams, was a volleyball player at Utah Valley State and San Diego.

== Career statistics ==
Appearances and goals by club, season and competition
Club	Season	League			Cup (Note: All appearances in the Finnish Women's Cup)		Continental		Other		Total	
Club	Season	Division	Apps	Goals	Apps	Goals	Apps	Goals	Apps	Goals	Apps	Goals
Chicago Cobras	2004	USL W-League	11	14	—		—		3+ (Note: Appearance(s) in the USL W-League playoffs)	1	14+	15
Arizona Heatwave	2005	USL W-League	11	7	—		—		1	0	12	7
Ajax America Women	2006	WPSL			—		—		2+ (Note: Appearances in the WPSL playoffs)	1+	2+	1+
Mile High Edge	2007	USL W-League	11	1	—		—		—		11	1
Pali Blues	2008	USL W-League	9	5	—		—		1+	0	10+	5
Los Angeles Sol	2009	WPS	7	0	—		—		0	0	7	0
Ajax America Women (loan)	2009	WPSL	3	1	—		—		1+	1+	4+	2+
Boston Breakers	2010	WPS	11	2	—		—		0	0	11	2
Boston Breakers	2011	WPS	11	1	—		—		0	0	11	1
Boston Breakers	Total		22	3	0	0	0	0	0	0	22	3
Boston Aztec (loan)	2010	WPSL	2	1	—		—				2+	1+
Pali Blues	2012	USL W-League	9	4	—		—		3	2	12	6
PK-35 Vantaa	2012	Naisten Liiga	5	2	1+	1+	2 (Note: Appearances in the UEFA Women's Champions League)	0	—		8+	3+
Seattle Reign	2013	NWSL	20	1	—		—		—		20	1
FC Kansas City	2014	NWSL	13	1	—		—		1 (Note: Appearance in the NWSL Playoffs)	0	14	1
FC Kansas City	2015	NWSL	18	3	—		—		0	0	18	3
FC Kansas City	Total		31	4	0	0	0	0	1	0	32	4
Career total			141+	43+	1+	1+	2	0	12+	5+	156+	49+

== Honors ==
Chicago Cobras

- USL W-League Central Conference – Midwest Division: 2004

Ajax America Women

- WPSL West Conference: 2006
- WPSL Pacific Conference – South Division: 2009

Pali Blues

- USL W-League: 2008
- USL W-League (regular season): 2008
- USL W-League Western Conference: 2008, 2012

Los Angeles Sol

- Women's Professional Soccer (regular season): 2009

Boston Aztec

- Women's Premier Soccer League: 2010
- WPSL East Conference – Northeast Division: 2010

PK-35 Vantaa

- Naisten Liiga: 2012
- Finnish Women's Cup: 2012

FC Kansas City

- National Women's Soccer League: 2014, 2015

Individual

- Gatorade Utah Player of the Year: 2002
- NSCAA Utah High School Player of the Year: 2002
- USSAA Honorable Mention All-American: 2002
- Pac-10 Freshman of the Year: 2002
- Soccer America Freshman First Team All-American: 2002
- All-Pac 10 First Team: 2002, 2005
- All-Pac 10 Honorable Mention: 2003
- All-Pac 10 Second Team: 2004
- NSCAA All-Pacific Region Third Team: 2005
- All-WPSL First Team: 2006
- WPSL All-Final Four Tournament Team: 2006
