= Peter Palúch =

Slovak footballer

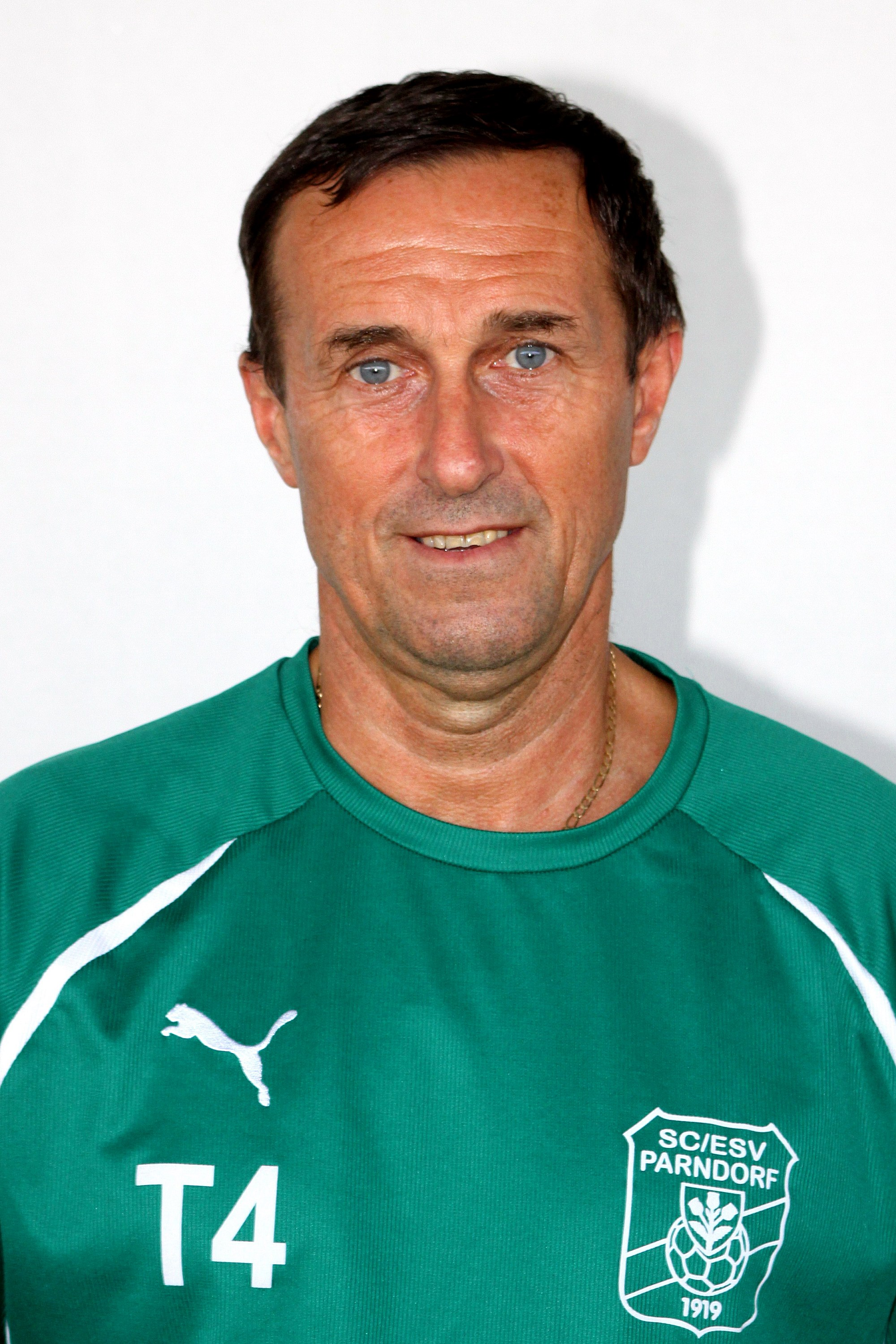

Personal information
- Full name: Peter Palúch
- Date of birth: 17 February 1958 (age 68)
- Place of birth: Ružomberok, Czechoslovakia
- Position: Goalkeeper

Peter Palúch (born 17 February 1958) is a former Slovak football goalkeeper. He played for FC Nitra and took part on the Czechoslovak squad in the 1990 FIFA World Cup, in which he was the third option at goals for Jozef Vengloš, then manager of the Czechoslovaks. He did not earn any full international caps, but played in unofficial matches.

== Career ==
Born in Ružomberok, Palúch began playing football with local side FC Plastika Nitra. He would spend much of his career in Austria, playing for Wiener Sport-Club and First Vienna FC.
