= Kendra Chavarría =

Panamanian footballer (born 1989)

Personal information
- Date of birth: 25 November 1989 (age 36)
- Position: Midfielder

International career^{‡}
Years	Team	Apps	(Gls)
2006–2007	Panama U20		(1+)
2014	Panama	1+	(0)
- ‡ National team caps and goals as of 20 May 2014

Kendra Chavarría (born 25 November 1989) is a Panamanian footballer who plays as a midfielder. She has been a member of the Panama women's national team.

She has also captained the Panama women's national flag football team, winning the 2016 IFAF Flag Football World Championship. She began playing at the club level in 2011, lining up at both wide receiver and cornerback in the Liga de Flag Football Femenino de Panamá (LIFFF Panama).

== International career ==
Chavarría represented the national under-20 team at the 2006 CONCACAF Women's U-20 Championship in Mexico.

Chavarría capped for Panama at senior level during the 2014 CONCACAF Women's Championship qualification.

== See also ==
- List of Panama women's international footballers
