= Kristen Meier =

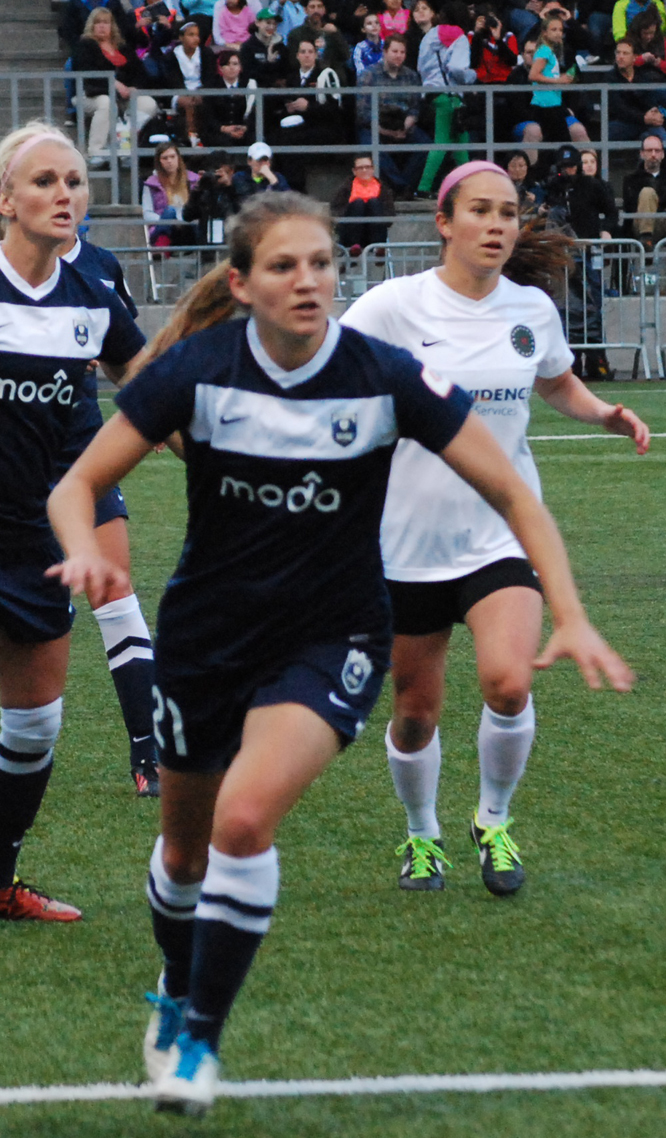

Personal information
- Full name: Kristen Meier Vlahos
- Birth name: Kristen Nicole Meier
- Date of birth: February 8, 1991 (age 35)
- Place of birth: Syracuse, New York, United States
- Height: 5 ft 6 in (1.68 m)
- Positions: Midfielder; defender

Youth career
- Tophat SC

College career
Years	Team	Apps	(Gls)
2009–2012	Wake Forest Demon Deacons		

Senior career*
Years	Team	Apps	(Gls)
2013	Seattle Reign FC	6	(0)
- * Club domestic league appearances and goals as of August 20, 2013

Kristen Meier Vlahos (born Kristen Nicole Meier; February 8, 1991) is an American professional soccer midfielder and defender who most recently played for Seattle Reign FC of the NWSL.

== Early life ==
Born in Syracuse, New York to parents Richard and Janice Meier, Kristen attended Marist School in Alpharetta, Georgia where she was a four-year letter winner in soccer and basketball. In 2008, Meier helped the Marist soccer team win the Georgia 4A Soccer State Championship and was named 2008 Georgia Soccer Coaches Association 4A Player of the Year. Meier also played for local club team, Tophat Soccer Club, and helped the team win state championships in 2006 and 2007. In 2008, the team was the 2008 Region III East Premier League champions, finishing the season undefeated.

=== Wake Forest University ===
Meier attended Wake Forest University and majored in mathematical economics. As a member of the women's soccer team, she played in 88 games during her career (tied for the fifth-most in Wake Forest history) and made 77 starts. She totaled nine goals and 36 points. Meier earned the 2012 NCAA Performer of the Week and was named to the 2011 All-NCAA Tournament Team, 2011 Top Drawer Soccer National Team of the Week, and 2011 Wake Forest Nike Challenge All-Tournament Team.

== Playing career ==
=== Club ===
==== Seattle Reign FC ====
On January 18, 2013, Meier was selected in the third round (23rd overall pick) of the 2013 NWSL College Draft by Seattle Reign FC for the inaugural season of the NWSL. She made six appearances for the club during the 2013 season including four starts, tallying a total of 363 minutes on the defensive line.
