= Miguel Davis =

Costa Rican footballer (born 1966)

Personal information
- Full name: Miguel Davis García
- Date of birth: 18 June 1966 (age 60)
- Place of birth: Costa Rica
- Positions: Defensive midfielder; defender

Senior career*
Years	Team	Apps	(Gls)
1989–1991	Alajuelense		
1992–1993	Turrialba		
- Carmelita
1995–1998	Cartaginés		
1998–1999	Limón		

International career
1990–1994	Costa Rica	9	(1)
- * Club domestic league appearances and goals

Miguel Davis García (born 18 June 1966) is a Costa Rican former football defender who was selected by Costa Rica for the 1990 FIFA World Cup.

== Club career ==
The long-haired and moustached Davis started his career at Alajuelense, with whom he won the 1991 league title, and also played for Turrialba, Carmelita and Cartaginés, whom he joined in summer 1995. In summer 1998 he moved to Limón.

His career was troubled due to alcohol abuse.

== International career ==
Davis was a non-playing squad member at the 1990 FIFA World Cup and played in 1 FIFA World Cup qualification match.

His final international was a December 1994 friendly match against Saudi Arabia.

=== International goals ===
Scores and results list Costa Rica's goal tally first.

N.	Date	Venue	Opponent	Score	Result	Competition
1.	29 April 1992	Estadio Cuscatlán, San Salvador, El Salvador	El Salvador	1-1	1–1	Friendly match
