= Lindsay Taylor (soccer) =

American soccer player (born 1989)

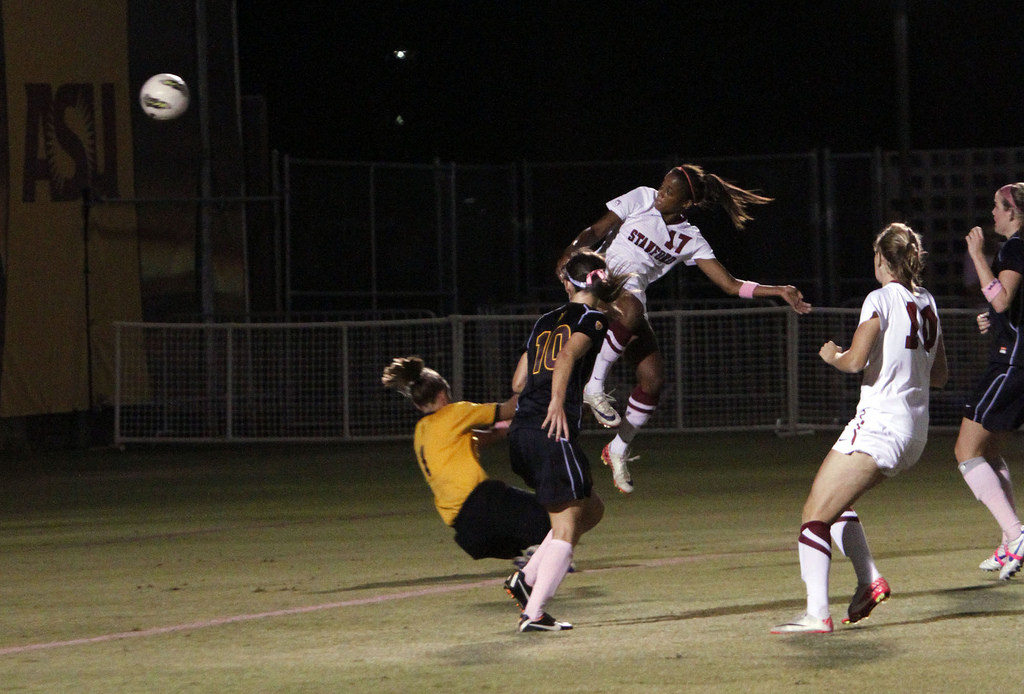
- Taylor (17) heads the ball past Arizona State's goalkeeper on October 14, 2011, in Tempe, Arizona

Personal information
- Full name: Lindsay Marie Taylor
- Date of birth: October 25, 1989 (age 37)
- Place of birth: Los Altos, California, United States
- Height: 5 ft 7 in (1.70 m)
- Position: Forward

Youth career
- Mountain View-Los Altos Mercury

College career
Years	Team	Apps	(Gls)
2008–2011	Stanford Cardinal		

Senior career*
Years	Team	Apps	(Gls)
2012	California Storm		
2012	Arna-Bjørnar		
2013	Seattle Reign FC	6	(1)
2013	Washington Spirit	6	(0)
- * Club domestic league appearances and goals

Lindsay Marie Taylor (born October 25, 1989) is an American professional soccer forward. She played for the Washington Spirit in the NWSL and was a member of the United States U-23 women's national soccer team.

== Early life ==
Taylor was born in California to parents, Gary and Jennifer Taylor. She attended Castilleja School in her hometown of Palo Alto, California where she was a two-time NSCAA All-American and a four-year letterwinner. Taylor was named 2007 Parade Magazine All-American but did not play high school soccer. Instead, she played for the club team, Mountain View-Los Altos Mercury and won three consecutive Cal-North State Cup titles.

=== Stanford University ===
Taylor attended Stanford University where she broke the school record for most games started (98) in a career and is tied with teammate Teresa Noyola for most games played at 102. Taylor is ranked number five on Stanford's all-time scoring list with 133 points, number four on Stanford's all-time goals list with 53, and number seven on Stanford's all-time assist list with 27. She is Stanford's school record-holder in career shots with 349.

== Playing career ==
=== Club ===
==== California Storm ====
In 2012, Taylor was selected as the first pick (sixth overall) by the Western New York Flash in the 2012 WPS Draft; however, the league folded before the season began. She did not play with the Flash in the 2012 WPSL Elite season, instead playing for the WPSL's California Storm with former Stanford teammates, Teresa Noyola and Rachel Quon.

==== Arna-Bjørnar ====
Taylor spent the last part of 2012 with Norwegian first division club Arna-Bjørnar. She made five appearances for the club, including two starts.

==== Seattle Reign FC ====
Taylor signed with the Seattle Reign FC as a free agent for the inaugural season of the NWSL. After recovering from an eye injury during the first few games of the season, Taylor made her debut for the team in a match against Sky Blue FC on May 11, 2013. She scored her first goal during the squad's subsequent match against the Washington Spirit on May 16, 2013 at Starfire Stadium. During a friendly match against the Haiti national team, she scored a hat trick helping lead the Reign to a 6–0 win. Taylor made six appearances for the Reign during the regular season and scored one goal before being traded mid-season to the Washington Spirit.

==== Washington Spirit ====
On July 1, 2013, it was announced that Taylor was traded to the Washington Spirit along with a "conditional fourth round pick" in the 2014 NWSL College Draft for the Spirit's second round pick.

=== International ===
In 2006, Taylor represented the United States as a member of the U-17 team. She was called into the United States U-23 camps in October 2011 and May 2012.

== See also ==
- List of Stanford University people
