= Erika Vanegas =

Mexican footballer (born 1988)

Erika Venegas
Personal information
- Full name: Erika Venegas González
- Date of birth: 7 July 1988 (age 38)
- Place of birth: Mexico
- Height: 1.70 m (5 ft 7 in)
- Position: Goalkeeper

International career
Years	Team	Apps	(Gls)
2008–2010	Mexico U-20		
2010–2011	Mexico		

Erika Venegas González (born July 7, 1988) is a Mexican former footballer who played as a goalkeeper for the Mexico women's national football team.
