= Kristina Larsen (soccer) =

American soccer player

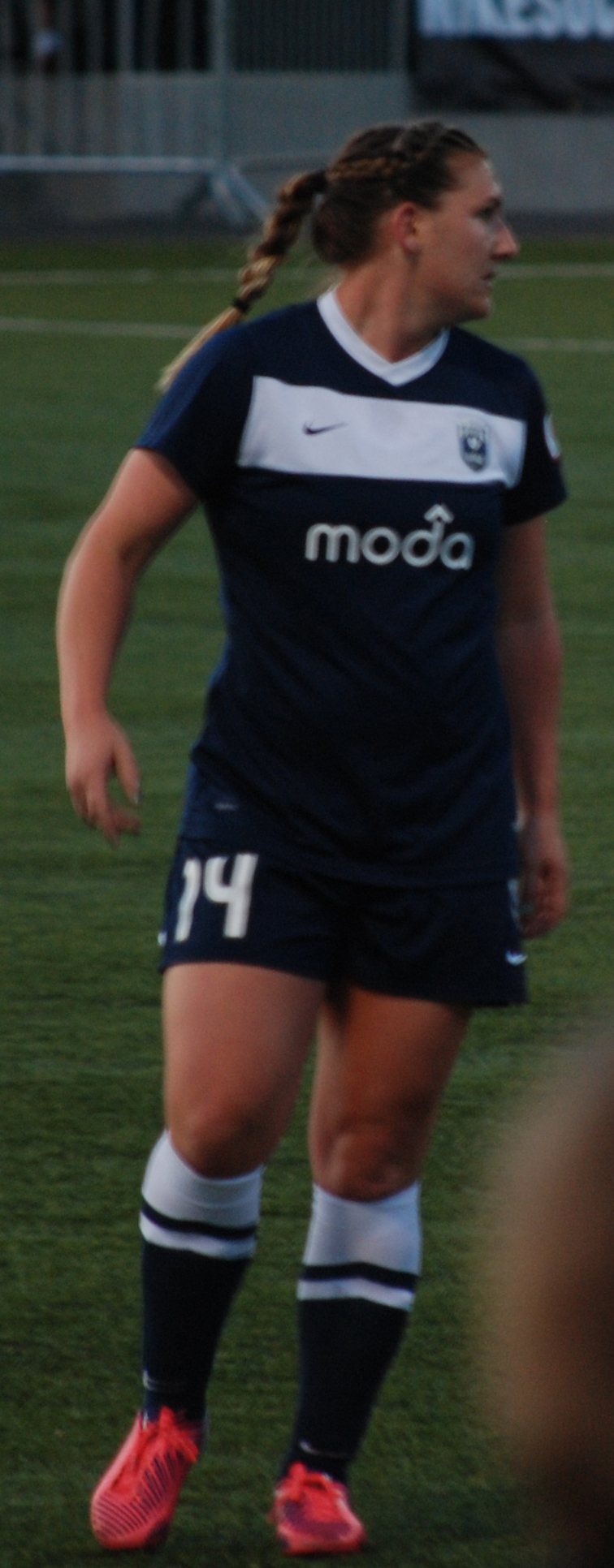

Personal information
- Full name: Kristina Erin Larsen
- Date of birth: June 16, 1988 (age 38)
- Place of birth: Burbank, California, United States
- Height: 5 ft 5 in (1.65 m)
- Position: Forward

Youth career
- Southern California Blues

College career
Years	Team	Apps	(Gls)
2006–2009	UCLA Bruins		

Senior career*
Years	Team	Apps	(Gls)
2010	Saint Louis Athletica		
2011	Atlanta Beat	6	(0)
2013	Seattle Reign	9	(0)
- * Club domestic league appearances and goals

Kristina Erin Larsen (born June 16, 1988) is an American professional soccer forward. She previously played for the Atlanta Beat and Saint Louis Athletica of Women's Professional Soccer (WPS) and Seattle Reign FC in the National Women's Soccer League (NWSL).

== Early life ==
Larsen was born in Burbank, California and grew up in Mission Viejo. She attended Mission Viejo High School where she was a four-year letterwinner on the soccer team. She was ranked a Top 50 recruit according to Soccer Buzz Magazine, was a three-time NSCAA/adidas Youth All-American, and a two-time All-CIF First-Team selection.

Larsen played club soccer for the Southern California Blues.

=== UCLA ===
Larsen attended UCLA and was a leading goal-scorer for the Bruins from 2006 to 2009. As a freshman in 2006, she appeared in 22 matches, starting 19. She ended the season tied for fifth on the team in scoring with six goals. She scored two game-winning goals in a pair of 1–0 victories over San Diego State and Long Beach State. Larsen was named to the Pac-10 All-Freshman team. During her sophomore year, she played in 23 of 24 matches, making four starts. She finished the season with 11 points including five goals and one assist. A workhorse under pressure, Larsen scored three of her five goals during the NCAA Tournament, helping the Bruins to wins over Cal State Fullerton, Oklahoma State, and Virginia. She scored the equalizer goal against Virginia in a match the Bruins eventually won 2–1 in overtime. In 2008, she appeared in all 25 matches, making 10 starts and led the team in goals with 13. She also ranked second on the team in scoring with 30 points, including five game-winning goals and four assists. During her senior year, Larsen appeared in 22 games, making 20 starts. She scored nine goals and served six assists for 24 points. She ranked third in scoring for UCLA, and scored three game-winning goals.

== Playing career ==
=== Club ===
==== The WPS Years, 2010–2011 ====
Larsen was selected during the second round of the 2010 WPS Draft by the St. Louis Athletica for the 2010 WPS season. After the Athletica folded mid-season 2010, Larsen signed with the Atlanta Beat. She made six appearances for the club with three starts playing a total of 330 minutes.

==== Seattle Reign FC, 2013 ====
In 2013, Larsen joined Seattle Reign FC for the inaugural season of the National Women's Soccer League. She made nine appearances for the club, including four starts, tallying 344 minutes as a forward on the squad. She served the assist on a goal scored by Lindsay Taylor during a home match against the Washington Spirit on May 16, 2013.

=== International ===
Larsen represented the United States as a member of the United States under-17 women's national soccer team. She was also a member of the U-20 and U-23 national team pools.
