= Yolanda Hamilton (footballer) =

Jamaican footballer (born 1987)

Personal information
- Date of birth: 26 May 1987 (age 39)
- Position: Defender

Youth career
- Barbican FC

International career
| Years | Team | Apps | (Gls) |
| 2014 | Jamaica | | |

Yolanda Hamilton (born 26 May 1987) is a Jamaican women's international footballer who played as a defender for the Jamaica women's national football team. She was part of the team at the 2014 CONCACAF Women's Championship. At the club level, she plays for Barbican FC in Jamaica.
