= Selenia Iacchelli =

Canadian soccer player

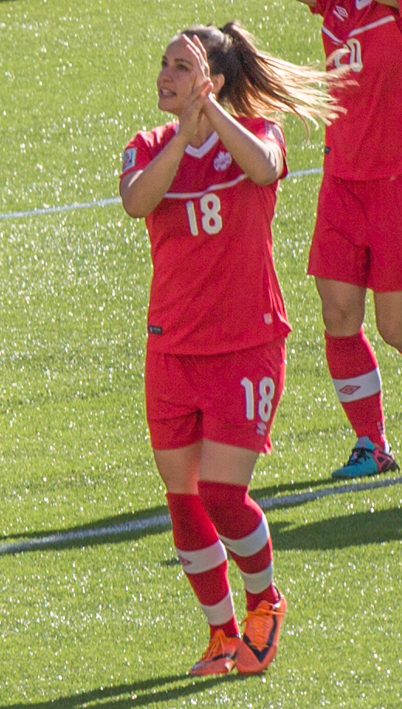

Personal information
- Date of birth: 5 June 1986 (age 40)
- Place of birth: Edmonton, Alberta, Canada
- Height: 1.73 m (5 ft 8 in)
- Position: Midfielder

College career
Years	Team	Apps	(Gls)
2005–2008	Nebraska Cornhuskers	77	(9)

Senior career*
Years	Team	Apps	(Gls)
2004	Edmonton Aviators Women	2	(0)
2006–2008	Vancouver Whitecaps	20	(2)
2010	Torres	4	(0)
2016	North Shore Girls SC		

International career
2003	Canada U-23	1	(0)
2004	Canada U-19	6	(0)
2006	Canada U-20	3	(1)
2013–2014	Canada	4	(0)
- * Club domestic league appearances and goals

Selenia Iacchelli (born 5 June 1986) is a Canadian soccer player who played as a midfielder.

== International career ==
She represented Canada at the 2004 FIFA U-19 Women's World Championship and 2006 FIFA U-20 Women's World Championship. After a series of injuries she made her debut for the senior Canadian team at the age of 27 in November 2013, in a 0–0 draw with Mexico.

== Club career ==
Iacchelli's move to Western New York Flash collapsed in April 2014 when she failed the medical. A year earlier she had agreed a move to Doncaster Rovers Belles of the English FA WSL, but broke her arm.

In 2016, she played with North Shore Girls SC in the Women's Premier Soccer League.

== Career statistics ==
Club	Season	League			Total	
Club	Season	Division	Apps	Goals	Apps	Goals
Edmonton Aviators Women	2004	W-League	2	0	2	0

== Personal life ==
Iacchelli and Canadian teammate Emily Zurrer operate a food truck business which sells frozen yoghurt and Belgian waffles.
