= Emily Zurrer =

Canadian soccer player (born 1987)

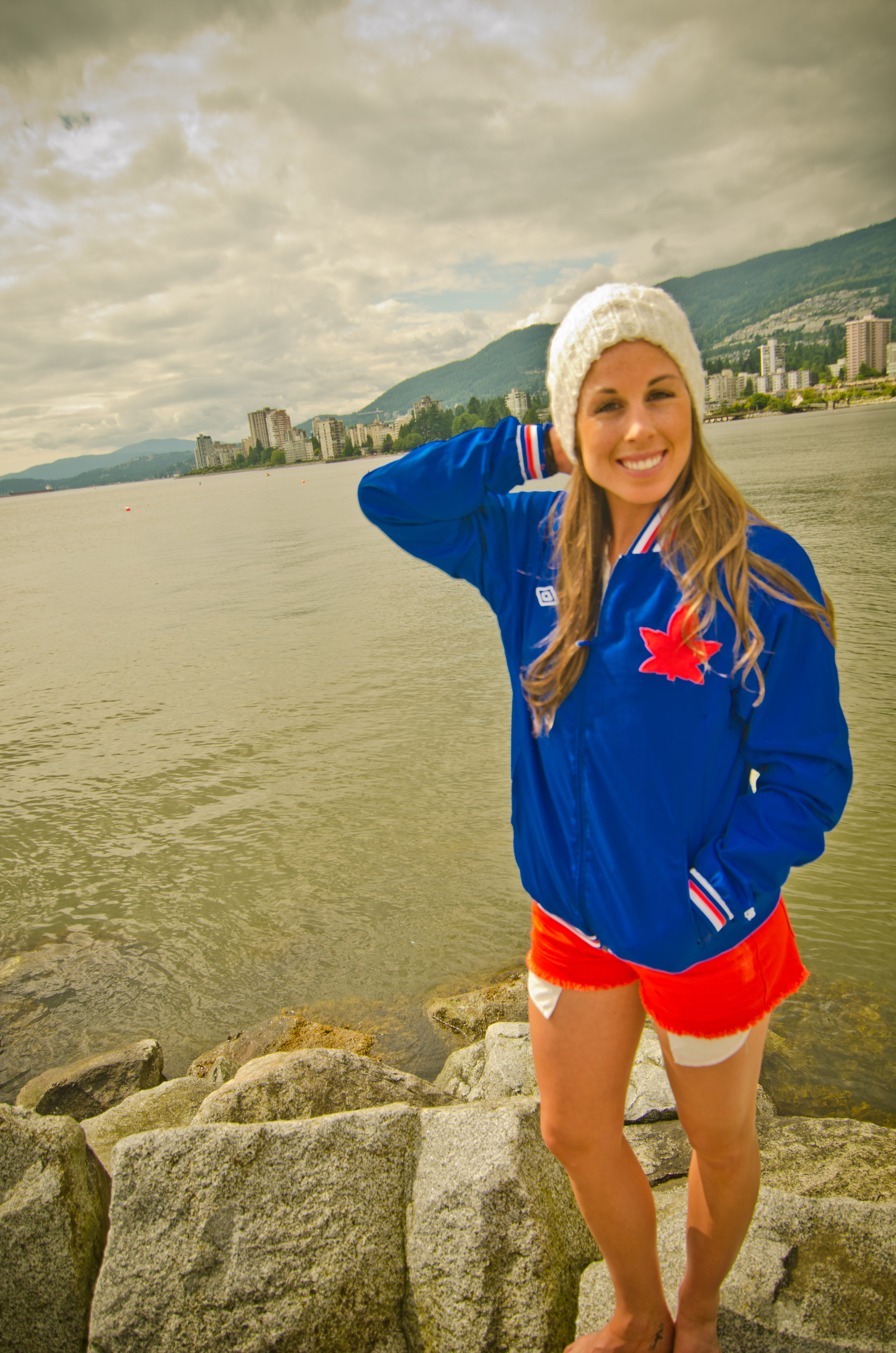
- Zurrer in 2012

Personal information
- Full name: Emily Jane Zurrer
- Date of birth: July 12, 1987 (age 39)
- Place of birth: Vancouver, British Columbia, Canada
- Height: 1.78 m (5 ft 10 in)
- Position: Defender

College career
Years	Team	Apps	(Gls)
2005–2008	Illinois Fighting Illini		

Senior career*
Years	Team	Apps	(Gls)
2008	Vancouver Whitecaps	4	(1)
2009	Chicago Red Eleven	10	(3)
2010	SG Essen-Schönebeck	9	(0)
2010–2011	Vancouver Whitecaps	7	(1)
2011	Dalsjöfors GoIF	10	(2)
2013	Seattle Reign FC	7	(0)
2014	Jitex BK	19	(1)

International career
2004	Canada U17	1	(0)
2006	Canada U20	18	(0)
2008–2014	Canada	82	(3)
Medal record
Olympic Games
Bronze medal – third place	2012 London	Team
- * Club domestic league appearances and goals

Emily Jane Zurrer (born July 12, 1987) is a Canadian former soccer player who played as a defender. She previously played for Seattle Reign FC in the National Women's Soccer League, Dalsjöfors GoIF in the Damallsvenskan, and the Vancouver Whitecaps in the W-League.

== Early life ==
Zurrer attended the University of Illinois and ended her collegiate career as one of the most decorated players in Illinois history. She was the first three-time All-American in program history and earned first-team All-Big Ten honours three years in a row. Additionally, Zurrer was named Big Ten Co-Defensive Player of the Year during her sophomore campaign.

During her tenure on the back line, Illinois produced 42 shutouts and gave up the second-fewest goals in program history in 2008, allowing just 19.

Coach Janet Rayfield said of Zurrer, "Emily keeps everything in perspective and weathers the ups and downs of life and of athletics with an amazing positive demeanor and a constant smile. She has lofty goals and goes after them with intent and purpose. She is in simple words – a positive life force."

During her time at the University of Illinois, Zurrer was also very active off the field, taking a lead role in Illinois' Hometown Heroes program, which includes visits to local elementary schools and seniors' centres, in addition to involvement with Read Across America, Carle Pediatrics, Relay for Life, Yankee Ridge After School Program, Crisis Nursery Holiday Shop and Big Brothers Big Sisters.

Zurrer was awarded the Big Ten Medal of Honor her senior year in 2009. Awarded to one male and one female student-athlete from the graduating class of each member university who had "attained the greatest proficiency in athletics and scholastic work."

== Club career ==
=== Vancouver Whitecaps ===
Zurrer played for the Vancouver Whitecaps off and on for multiple seasons starting in 2004, in between Canadian national team duty and attending university. Her most recent stint was during the 2010 season. She made seven appearances and scored one goal.

=== Chicago Red Eleven ===
Played for the Red Eleven in 2009, starting all appearances and scoring 3 goals.

=== SG Essen-Schönebeck ===
During the 2009–10 season, Zurrer played for SG Essen-Schönebeck in Germany's Bundesliga. She started in all nine games in which she played.

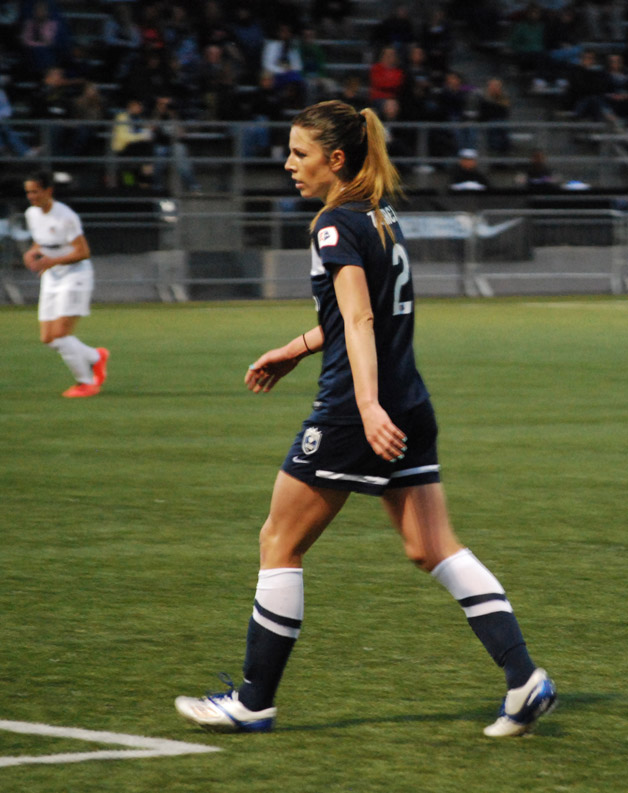
With Seattle Reign in 2013

=== Dalsjöfors GoIF ===
In July 2011, she signed a three-month contract with Swedish side Dalsjöfors GoIF. Zurrer started in all ten games that she played.

=== Seattle Reign FC ===
On January 11, 2013, as part of the NWSL Player Allocation, Zurrer joined the Seattle Reign FC in the National Women's Soccer League (NWSL). She played in seven games for the Reign, tallying 583 minutes.

=== Jitex BK ===
In December 2013, Zurrer signed with Jitex BK for the 2014 Damallsvenskan. She captained the team.

== International career ==
Zurrer played for the Canadian national women's team, most notably at the 2004 FIFA U-19 Women's World Championship, FIFA Women's World Cup 2011, the 2008 Summer Olympics in Beijing, the 2012 Summer Olympics in London, and the 2015 FIFA Women's World Cup in Canada. She started playing for Canada at age 15 as a forward, and burst onto Canadian soccer radar when she scored 3 goals as a defender and was named MVP of the U-19 World Cup Qualifying tournament in 2004 at age 16. She has played defence ever since. She also received her first senior national team cap that year, when she played 90 minutes against the United States in Nashville, Tennessee, as one of the youngest capped players in Canadian soccer history.

As a member of the Canadian team at the 2008 Olympic Games in Beijing, Zurrer started every game in the defensive backfield.

Zurrer scored her first senior goal for Canada in the 2011 Cyprus Cup group stage match against Scotland in a 1–0 victory. Less than a week later, Zurrer scored the winning goal in extra time of the Cyprus Cup final against the Netherlands.

Zurrer was also a member of the national soccer team that competed in the 2012 Olympics. She won a bronze medal with the national team when Canada defeated France 1–0 on August 9, 2012.

== Personal life ==
In 2012, Zurrer launched a frozen yogurt food truck business with her Canadian teammate Selenia Iacchelli. Zurrer was featured in Sportsnet's 2013 "Beauty of Sport" – an issue featuring Canada's top 25 most beautiful athletes.
