= Latin American University of Science and Technology =

ULACIT
- Universidad Latinoamericana de Ciencia y Tecnología
- Motto: Sol Lucet Omnibus ("The sun shines for everyone")
- Type: Private
- Established: May 7, 1991
- Rector: Dr. Stanley Muschett
- Students: Approx. 2000, including Undergraduate and Postgraduate degrees
- Location: Vía España and Calle 74 E, Carrasquilla, Panama City, Panama; 9.0037°N 79.5120°W
- Website: www.ulacit.ac.pa

The Latin American University of science and Technology-Laureate International Universities (in Spanish: Universidad Latinoamericana de Ciencia y Tecnología) (ULACIT-LIU) was a private university located in Panama City, Panama.

Through Resuelto (Legal Order) N°3 del 7 de mayo de 1991, the Ministry of Education of Panama, under supervision of the University of Panama, approved the foundation of ULACIT.

== Characteristics ==
The Latin American University of Science and Technology is a private college. It has all the levels of higher education, from undergraduate degrees (25), to graduate and postgraduate degrees (16), and doctorates (2).

== History ==
ULACIT was founded on May 7, 1991. From 1999, ULACIT started to apply periods of study of four months, an academic innovation at the time. From October, 2004, ULACIT is member of Laureate International Universities, the world's largest network of private colleges. In 2006, ULACIT opened its Health Sciences Faculty, with the career of Dental Surgeon (Dentistry). Later, the Faculty opened also the careers of Medicine (2008), Nursing (2009), and, Nutrition and Dietetics (2009). In February 2010, ULACIT opened the first and only simulated hospital of Panama.

In 2014, the Ministry of Education of Panama approved the fusion of ULACIT with the Universidad Interamericana, with the latter absorbing the students and brands of ULACIT. The deal was part of the 2012 agreement with Laureate International Universities to purchase both universities (ULACIT and Universidad Interamericana).

In 2019, Laureate Education sold the remaining assets of both universities for a combined 86 Million USD.

== Faculties ==
- Administrative Sciences
- Health Sciences
- Law and Political Sciences
- Engineerings
