= Christina Murray =

Jamaican footballer (born 1989)

Personal information
- Date of birth: 8 October 1989 (age 37)
- Place of birth: Jamaica
- Position: Midfielder

Senior career*
Years	Team	Apps	(Gls)
2013	KR	15	(12)
- Waterhouse F.C.

International career^{‡}
2014–	Jamaica	3	(2)
- * Club domestic league appearances and goals ‡ National team caps and goals as of 21:56, 20 March 2015 (UTC)

Christina Murray (born 8 October 1989) is a Jamaican international footballer who plays as a midfielder. Her education began at Dunrobin Primary School and Excelsior High School in Kingston, Jamaica, and was completed at University of West Florida with a degree in Sports Management.
