= Venicia Reid =

Jamaican footballer (born 1987)

Personal information
- Date of birth: 28 October 1987 (age 39)
- Place of birth: Spanish Town, Jamaica
- Positions: Midfielder; forward

College career
Years	Team	Apps	(Gls)
2008–2009	Navarro Bulldogs		
2010	South Florida Bulls	14	

Senior career*
Years	Team	Apps	(Gls)
2002–2007	Portmore Strikers		
2016	Los Perfectos		

International career^{‡}
2006	Jamaica U20		(4)
2003–2015	Jamaica	12+	(21)
- * Club domestic league appearances and goals ‡ National team caps and goals as of 22:06, 16 March 2015 (UTC)

Venicia Reid (born 28 October 1987) is a Jamaican footballer who plays as midfielder or a forward. She was a member of the Jamaica women's national team.

== International goals ==
Scores and results list Jamaica's goal tally first

No.	Date	Venue	Opponent	Score	Result	Competition
1	5 December 2003	George Town, Truman Bodden Sports Complex	Cayman Islands	2–0	3–0	2004 Summer Olympics qualification
2	7 December 2003	George Town, Truman Bodden Sports Complex	Cayman Islands	1–0	1–0	2004 Summer Olympics qualification
3	8 May 2006	Jamaica	Saint Lucia	1–0	5–0	2006 CONCACAF Women's Gold Cup qualification
4	10 May 2006	Jamaica	Antigua and Barbuda	2–0	10–0	2006 CONCACAF Women's Gold Cup qualification
5	10 May 2006	Jamaica	Antigua and Barbuda	8–0	10–0	2006 CONCACAF Women's Gold Cup qualification
6	10 May 2006	Jamaica	Antigua and Barbuda	9–0	10–0	2006 CONCACAF Women's Gold Cup qualification
7	12 May 2006	Jamaica	Saint Kitts and Nevis	6–0	11–0	2006 CONCACAF Women's Gold Cup qualification
8	12 May 2006	Jamaica	Saint Kitts and Nevis	10–0	11–0	2006 CONCACAF Women's Gold Cup qualification
9	6 September 2006	Larry Gomes Stadium, Arima, Trinidad and Tobago	Bermuda	2–0	7–0	2006 CONCACAF Women's Gold Cup qualification
10	6 September 2006	Larry Gomes Stadium, Arima, Trinidad and Tobago	Bermuda	3–0	7–0	2006 CONCACAF Women's Gold Cup qualification
11	6 September 2006	Larry Gomes Stadium, Arima, Trinidad and Tobago	Bermuda	5–0	7–0	2006 CONCACAF Women's Gold Cup qualification
12	6 September 2006	Larry Gomes Stadium, Arima, Trinidad and Tobago	Bermuda	6–0	7–0	2006 CONCACAF Women's Gold Cup qualification
13	10 September 2006	Larry Gomes Stadium, Arima, Trinidad and Tobago	Haiti	2–0	3–0	2006 CONCACAF Women's Gold Cup qualification
14	19 November 2006	Tropical Park Stadium, Miami, Florida, United States	Panama	2–0	2–0	2006 CONCACAF Women's Gold Cup
15	18 July 2007	Estádio Antunes, Rio de Janeiro, Brazil	Canada	1–8	1–11	2007 Pan American Games
16	21 August 2014	Ato Boldon Stadium, Couva, Trinidad and Tobago	Bermuda	8–1	9–1	2014 CFU Women's Caribbean Cup
17	23 August 2015	Estadio Panamericano, San Cristóbal, Dominican Republic	Dominican Republic	2–0	6–0	2016 CONCACAF Women's Olympic Qualifying Championship qualification
18	23 August 2015	Estadio Panamericano, San Cristóbal, Dominican Republic	Dominican Republic	4–0	6–0	2016 CONCACAF Women's Olympic Qualifying Championship qualification
19	25 August 2015	Estadio Panamericano, San Cristóbal, Dominican Republic	Dominica	1–0	13–0	2016 CONCACAF Women's Olympic Qualifying Championship qualification
20	25 August 2015	Estadio Panamericano, San Cristóbal, Dominican Republic	Dominica	6–0	13–0	2016 CONCACAF Women's Olympic Qualifying Championship qualification
21	25 August 2015	Estadio Panamericano, San Cristóbal, Dominican Republic	Dominica	8–0	13–0	2016 CONCACAF Women's Olympic Qualifying Championship qualification
