= Jordan Angeli =

American soccer player (born 1986)

Personal information
- Full name: Jordan Leigh Angeli
- Date of birth: May 31, 1986 (age 40)
- Place of birth: Englewood, Colorado, U.S.
- Height: 5 ft 9 in (1.75 m)
- Positions: Forward; defender

Youth career
- 2001–2005: Colorado Rush

College career
Years	Team	Apps	(Gls)
2004–2009	Santa Clara Broncos		

Senior career*
Years	Team	Apps	(Gls)
2010–2012	Boston Breakers	22	(8)
2014	Washington Spirit	10	(0)
2015	WNY Flash	3	(1)

International career
2005–2006	United States U-20		
- * Club domestic league appearances and goals

Jordan Leigh Angeli (born May 31, 1986) is an American former soccer player and current soccer commentator. Known for her versatility, Angeli played for Boston Breakers in the Women's Professional Soccer, and the Washington Spirit and Western New York Flash in the National Women's Soccer League (NWSL).

== Early life ==
Born in Englewood, Colorado, Angeli attended Green Mountain High School in Lakewood. In 2003, she was named Soccer America Player of the Month and earned 2003 All-Jeffco first team honors as well as an All-State honorable mention. The following year she was named the 2004 Gatorade Colorado High School Girls Soccer Player of the Year, 2004 Colorado 5A All-State player, and was a 2004 McDonald's All-American. During Angeli's high school career, the team won league championships in 2002 and 2004.

Angeli played for Colorado Rush and led the team to the 2001 under-15 National Championship. Her team also won the regional tournament in 2004.

== College career ==
Angeli played college soccer for the Santa Clara Broncos. She debuted as a defender, and was moved to forward for Santa Clara in 2005.

== Club career ==
=== Boston Breakers, 2010–2012 ===
Angeli was selected by the Boston Breakers in the second round (16th pick overall) of the 2010 WPS Draft. During the 2010 WPS season, she was on the starting lineup in 17 of the 22 games in which she played. She scored seven goals in her 1,576 minutes on the pitch helping the Breakers place second during the regular season with a 10–6–8 record. The Breakers advanced to the playoffs but were defeated during the semi-final match by the Philadelphia Independence.

Angeli returned to the Breakers for the 2011 WPS season. During the team's first season game against the Atlanta Beat, she suffered a season-ending ACL injury. In her 29 minutes played during the season, she scored one goal helping the Breakers defeat the Beat 4–1.

=== Washington Spirit, 2013–2014 ===
In 2013, Angeli was selected by the Washington Spirit in the 2013 NWSL supplemental draft. Still recovering from knee surgery, she did not play for the Spirit during the 2013 season.

=== Western New York Flash, 2015 ===
Following the 2014 NWSL season, the Spirit traded Angeli and a first-round pick—sixth overall—in the 2015 NWSL College Draft to the Western New York Flash for Angela Salem and Katherine Reynolds. The first-round pick later became Lynn Williams Biyendolo.

Angeli announced her retirement from playing soccer in June 2016.

== International career ==
She played as a midfielder for the United States under-20 team at the 2006 FIFA U-20 Women's World Championship.

== Broadcasting career ==
She is currently a television analyst for the Columbus Crew. She worked in a similar capacity alongside Maura Sheridan on the second games of the NWSL's Saturday night doubleheaders on Ion Television in 2024 and 2025. She transitioned to the network's studio analyst rotation starting in 2026.

== Denver Summit FC ==
Angeli was one of four individuals who spearheaded the For Denver FC grassroots movement which resulted in the establishment of Denver Summit FC as a NWSL expansion franchise on January 30, 2025. All four are among the ballclub's original investors.
