= Aveann Douglas =

Trinidadian footballer

Personal information
- Date of birth: 10 August 1986 (age 40)
- Place of birth: Arima, Trinidad and Tobago
- Height: 1.65 m (5 ft 5 in)
- Positions: Midfielder; forward

Youth career
- 2002–2005: St. George's College

College career
Years	Team	Apps	(Gls)
2006–2007	Monroe Tribunes	18	(2)
2009	USC Upstate Spartans	19	(0)
2011	West Florida Argonauts		

Senior career*
Years	Team	Apps	(Gls)
2004	Real Dimension		

International career^{‡}
2004	Trinidad and Tobago U19	1+	
2006	Trinidad and Tobago	3	(4)
- * Club domestic league appearances and goals ‡ National team caps and goals as of 6 September 2006

Aveann Douglas (born 10 August 1986) is a Trinidadian former footballer who played as a midfielder and a forward. She has been a member of the Trinidad and Tobago women's national team.

== Early life ==
Douglas was born and raised in Arima, Trinidad.

== High school and college career ==
Douglas has attended the St. George's College in her native Trinidad. After finishing her high school career, she moved to the United States, where she has attended the Monroe Community College, the University of South Carolina Upstate and the University of West Florida.

== Club career ==
Douglas has played in her country for Real Dimension.

== International career ==
Douglas represented Trinidad and Tobago at the 2004 CONCACAF Women's U-19 Championship. She capped at senior level during the 2006 CONCACAF Women's Gold Cup.

=== International goals ===
Scores and results list Trinidad and Tobago' goal tally first.

No.	Date	Venue	Opponent	Score	Result	Competition
1	21 May 2006	Larry Gomes Stadium, Arima, Trinidad and Tobago	Saint Vincent and the Grenadines	1–0	4–1	2006 CONCACAF Women's Gold Cup
2	23 May 2006	Larry Gomes Stadium, Arima, Trinidad and Tobago	Dominica	3–0	6–0	2006 CONCACAF Women's Gold Cup
3	23 May 2006	Larry Gomes Stadium, Arima, Trinidad and Tobago	Dominica	4–0	6–0	2006 CONCACAF Women's Gold Cup
4	6 September 2006	Larry Gomes Stadium, Arima, Trinidad and Tobago	Suriname	4–1	5–1	2006 CONCACAF Women's Gold Cup
