= Kasey Moore =

American soccer player

Personal information
- Full name: Kasey Ann Moore
- Date of birth: August 3, 1987 (age 39)
- Place of birth: Riverside, California, United States
- Height: 5 ft 8 in (1.73 m)
- Position: Defender

College career
Years	Team	Apps	(Gls)
2005–2008	Texas Longhorns		

Senior career*
Years	Team	Apps	(Gls)
2008	Ventura County Fusion	5	(1)
2009–2011	Boston Breakers	37	(3)
2009	→ Boston Aztec (loan)	2	(1)

International career
2003–2004	United States U-17		
2006	United States U-20		
2008	United States U-23	10	(0)
- * Club domestic league appearances and goals

Kasey Ann Moore (born August 3, 1987) is an American former soccer defender who played for Boston Breakers of Women's Professional Soccer. She was a member of the United States women's national under-23 soccer team.
