= Keeping Score =

Keeping Score may refer to:

- Baseball scorekeeping
- Keeping Score (classical music), the San Francisco Symphony's accessibility program for classical music
- Keeping Score (TV series), a documentary series featuring American soccer players
- "Keeping Score" (L D R U song), 2015
- "Keeping Score" (Dan + Shay song), 2018
