= Megan Rapinoe =

American soccer player (born 1985)

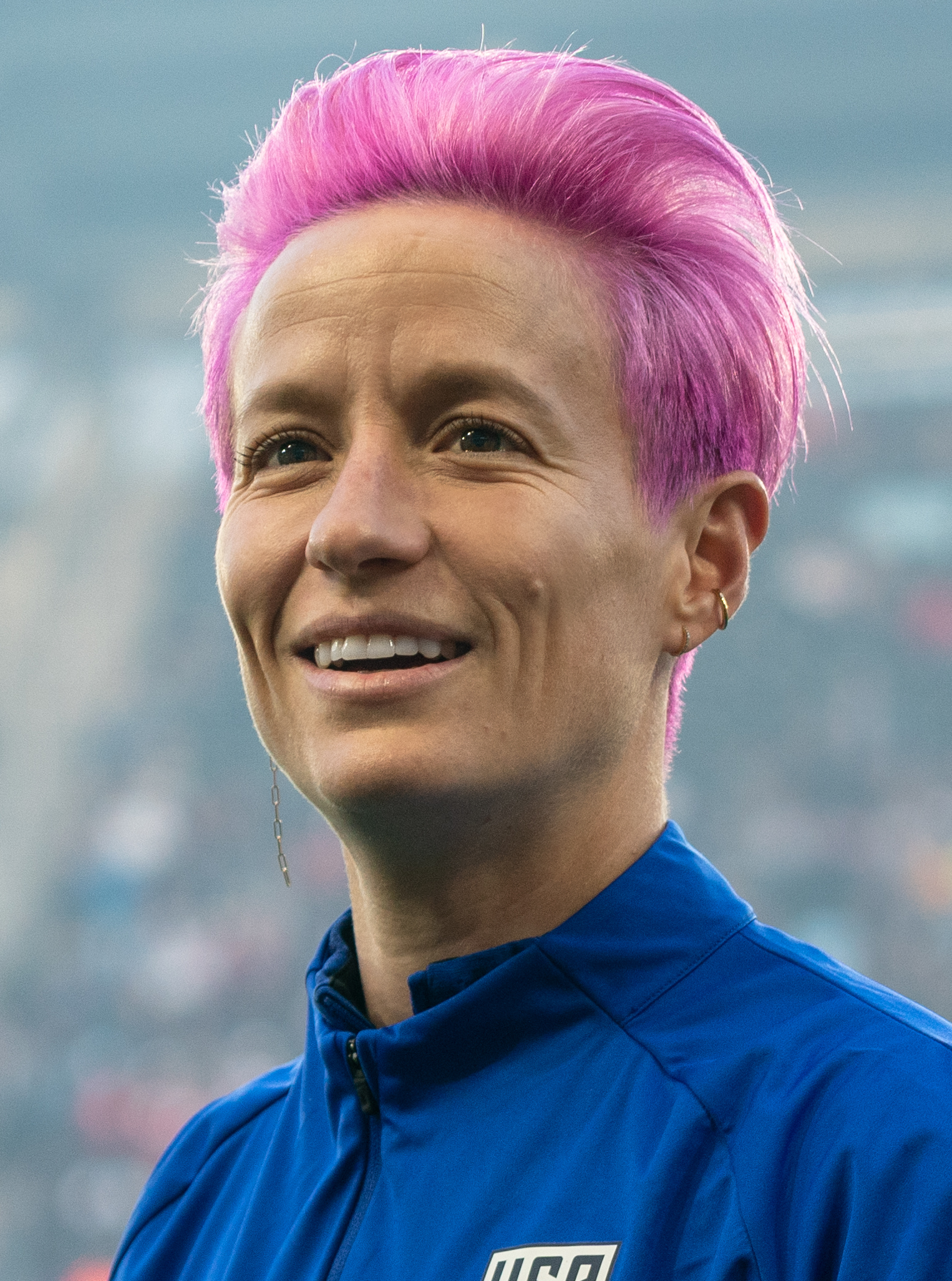
- Rapinoe with the United States in 2019

Personal information
- Full name: Megan Anna Rapinoe
- Date of birth: July 5, 1985 (age 41)
- Place of birth: Redding, California, U.S.
- Height: 5 ft 6 in (1.68 m)
- Positions: Midfielder; winger

Youth career
- 2002–2005: Elk Grove Pride

College career
Years	Team	Apps	(Gls)
2005–2008	Portland Pilots	60	(30)

Senior career*
Years	Team	Apps	(Gls)
2009–2010	Chicago Red Stars	38	(3)
2011	Philadelphia Independence	4	(1)
2011	MagicJack	10	(3)
2011	Sydney FC	2	(1)
2012	Seattle Sounders	2	(0)
2013–2014	Lyon	28	(8)
2013–2023	Seattle Reign FC (Note: The club has been called Seattle Reign FC (2013–2018, 2024–present), Reign FC (2019), and OL Reign (2020–2023).)	121	(52)
Total		205	(68)

International career^{‡}
2003–2005	United States U20	21	(9)
2006–2023	United States	203	(63)
Medal record
Women's soccer
Representing United States
FIFA Women's World Cup
Winner	2015 Canada
Winner	2019 France
Runner-up	2011 Germany
Olympic Games
Gold medal – first place	2012 London	Team
Bronze medal – third place	2020 Tokyo	Team
CONCACAF W Championship
Winner	2014 United States
Winner	2018 United States
Winner	2022 Mexico
- * Club domestic league appearances and goals as of October 21, 2023 ‡ National team caps and goals as of September 27, 2023

Megan Anna Rapinoe (Note: Pronunciation: /rəˈpiːnoʊ/) (born July 5, 1985) is an American former professional soccer player who played as a midfielder and winger. She spent most of her career playing for Seattle Reign FC of the National Women's Soccer League (NWSL) and the United States national team. Winner of the Ballon d'Or Féminin and named The Best FIFA Women's Player in 2019, Rapinoe was a member of the national teams that won the FIFA Women's World Cup in 2015 and 2019, and the team that finished second in 2011. She also won gold at the Olympics in 2012. Rapinoe co-captained the national team alongside Carli Lloyd and Alex Morgan from 2018 to 2020. She previously played for the Chicago Red Stars, Philadelphia Independence, and magicJack in Women's Professional Soccer (WPS), as well as Lyon Women in France's Division 1 Féminine. She was elected to the National Soccer Hall of Fame in November 2026, in her first year of eligibility, and is scheduled for induction on April 16, 2027.

Rapinoe's precise cross to Abby Wambach during the 2011 Women's World Cup quarterfinal match against Brazil led to an equalizer goal and an eventual U.S. victory; the play received ESPN's ESPY Award for Best Play of the Year. During the 2012 London Olympics, Rapinoe contributed three goals and four assists to lead the U.S. to a gold medal. She is the first player, male or female, to score a goal directly from a corner at the Olympic Games, having done so twice. She won both the Golden Boot and Golden Ball awards at the 2019 FIFA Women's World Cup in France.

Rapinoe is an advocate for various LGBTQIA+ organizations, including GLSEN and Athlete Ally. In 2013, she received the Board of Directors Award from the Los Angeles Gay and Lesbian Center. Rapinoe was included in Time's 100 Most Influential People of 2020. In July 2022, she received the Presidential Medal of Freedom from Joe Biden.

== Early life ==
Rapinoe grew up in Redding, California, with her parents, Jim and Denise, and five siblings, including her fraternal twin Rachael Rapinoe. Rapinoe's older siblings Michael and Jenny are Denise's children from a previous marriage, while her older brother Brian is a child of Denise and Jim, as are Rapinoe and her twin. Rapinoe's father and her grandfather Jack both served in the United States Army. As a child, Rapinoe idolized Brian and started playing soccer at age three after watching him play. Brian began using drugs when Rapinoe was in second grade, and he was put in juvenile detention when he was fifteen and she was ten. He was subsequently in and out of various prisons including Pelican Bay State Prison. According to Rapinoe, Brian has made a determined effort to avoid drugs after witnessing her success in soccer.

== Youth career ==
Rapinoe spent most of her youth playing on soccer teams coached by her father. While attending Foothill High School, she competed in track and basketball, and was on the honor roll every semester. She played for the under-14 Northern California state Olympic Development Program (ODP) team in 1999, and for the regional ODP team in 2002. From 2002 to 2005, Rapinoe, her sister Rachael, and her future national teammate Stephanie Cox played for the Elk Grove Pride club team in the Women's Premier Soccer League. (Note: Attributed to multiple references:) Rapinoe and her family would commute 2.5 hours so she could play with the team, which is based south of Sacramento. (Note: Attributed to multiple references:)

As a junior and senior, Rapinoe was named an All-American by Parade and the National Soccer Coaches Association of America (NSCAA). During the U.S. Youth Soccer National Championships in 2003, Rapinoe scored an equalizer goal in the 18th minute to tie the game 1–1 against the Peachtree City Lazers. Elk Grove finished second in the tournament after the Lazers scored a game-winning goal in the second half. Rapinoe was named to the McDonald's All-American Girls High School Soccer West Team in 2004.

== College career ==
The Rapinoe twins attended the University of Portland in Portland, Oregon. They almost committed to Santa Clara University before choosing to play for the Portland Pilots on full scholarships. Rapinoe played in the 2004 FIFA U-19 Women's World Championship in 2004, where the United States finished third.

As a freshman, Rapinoe helped the Pilots to an undefeated season and the NCAA Division I Women's Soccer Championship. During the College Cup quarterfinal against Notre Dame, she scored twice and served one assist as the Pilots won 3–1. During the College Cup final against UCLA, she contributed one goal and one assist in the Pilots' 4–0 victory. She was named NSCAA First Team All-American and was on the Soccer America First Team Freshman All-America. She made the NCAA Women's Soccer Championship All Tournament Team and was the West Coast Conference Freshman of the Year. She was also named to the All-West Coast Conference First Team and the All-West Coast Conference Freshman Team. Rapinoe started in all 25 games of the season as an attacking midfielder, scoring 15 goals—including seven game-winning goals—and serving 13 assists for 43 points, the fifth-highest point total for a freshman in the school's history.

As a sophomore in 2006, Rapinoe was among the nation's leading scorers with ten goals and two assists in eleven matches. During a match against Washington State University on October 5, she suffered a season-ending anterior cruciate ligament (ACL) injury. Despite the injury, she was one of four Portland Pilots players in history with 25 goals and 15 assists over two seasons. In 2007, Rapinoe suffered her second season-ending ACL injury two games into the season. She was granted a medical hardship waiver by the National Collegiate Athletic Association (NCAA) but did not use it. Rapinoe later said that getting injured was one of the best things that ever happened to her. She said it made her stronger and a "better person", and gave her a deeper appreciation for her endeavors as a soccer player.

After recovering from her second ACL injury, Rapinoe returned for the 2008 season and was on the starting lineup in all 22 games for the Pilots. She scored five goals and served 13 assists, helping the team to a 20–2 record. Her 13 assists ranked first for the Pilots as well as in the West Coast Conference and she was named West Coast Conference Player of the Year. She was also named a Soccer America First-Team All-American and NSCAA Second Team All-American. Although she had one more season of college eligibility remaining due to her hardship waiver, she opted to enter the Women's Professional Soccer Draft instead. Rapinoe's 88-point career, including 30 goals and 28 assists over 60 games, ranks tenth in the school's history.

== Club career ==
=== 2009–2011: Women's Professional Soccer ===
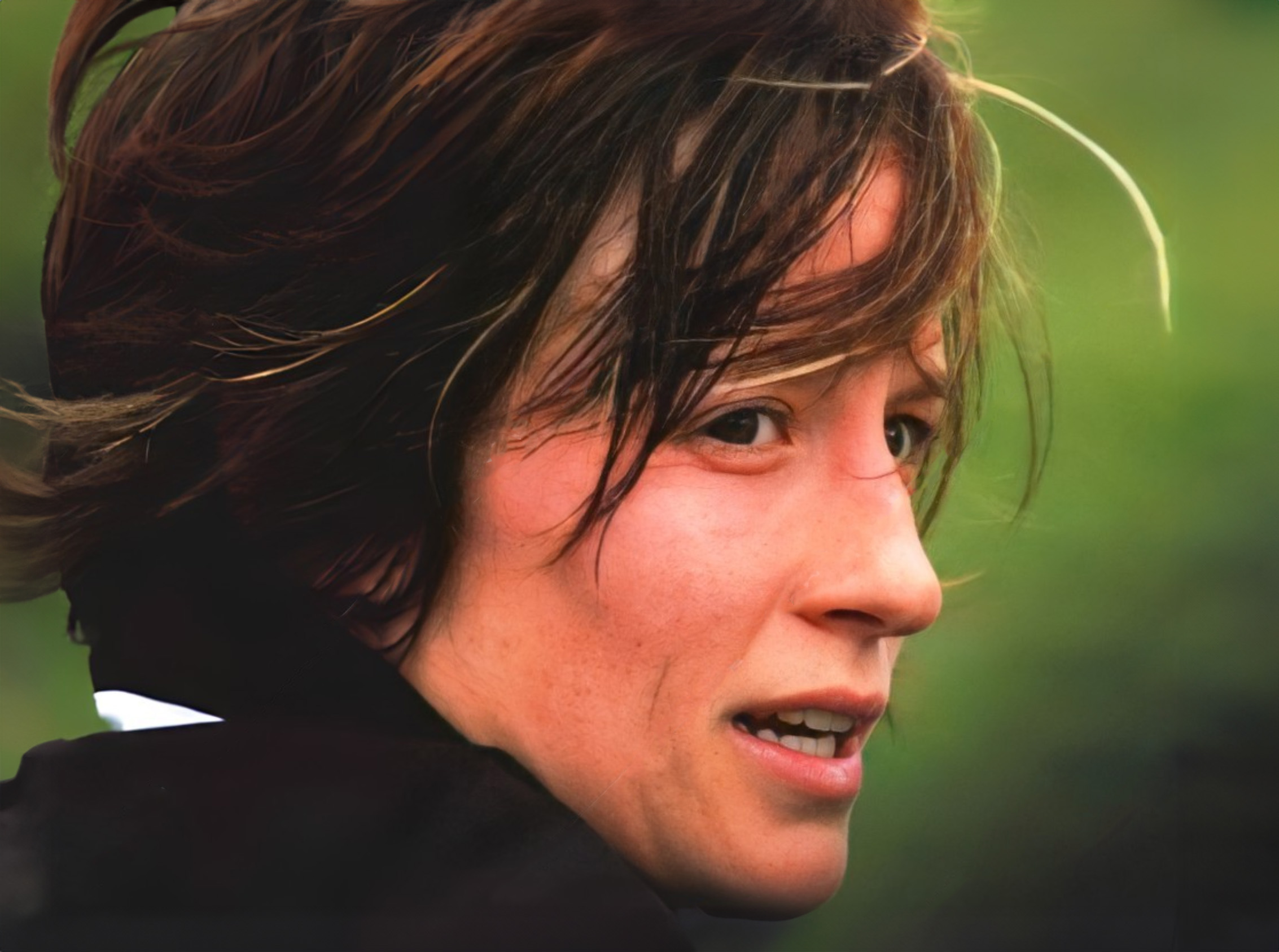
Rapinoe during the 2009 WPS All-Star Game

Rapinoe was selected second overall in the 2009 WPS Draft by the Chicago Red Stars for the inaugural season of Women's Professional Soccer (WPS), the highest division of soccer in the United States at the time. She scored two goals and assisted on three others during her debut season for the Red Stars. In August 2009, she was named to the league's All-Star Team and played in the 2009 WPS All-Star Game against the Swedish team Umeå, who were champions of the Damallsvenskan league. In 2010, Rapinoe appeared in 20 games and scored one goal.

In December 2010, Rapinoe signed with the expansion team Philadelphia Independence after the Red Stars ceased operations. She appeared in four games and scored one goal before being traded to MagicJack while she was in Germany for the 2011 FIFA Women's World Cup. It was reported that the "cash considerations" involved in the transfer were $100,000, during a time when the average salary for a player in the league was $25,000. (Note: Attributed to multiple references:) Rapinoe scored two goals in her eight regular-season appearances for MagicJack, helping the team finish third in the league standings and secure a spot in the playoffs. During the team's semifinal match against the Boston Breakers on August 17, 2011, Rapinoe scored a goal during the team's 3–1 win. MagicJack was defeated 2–0 by the Philadelphia Independence in the final. On October 25, the WPS voted to terminate the MagicJack franchise, leaving Rapinoe a free agent for the 2012 season. The league suspended operations in early 2012.

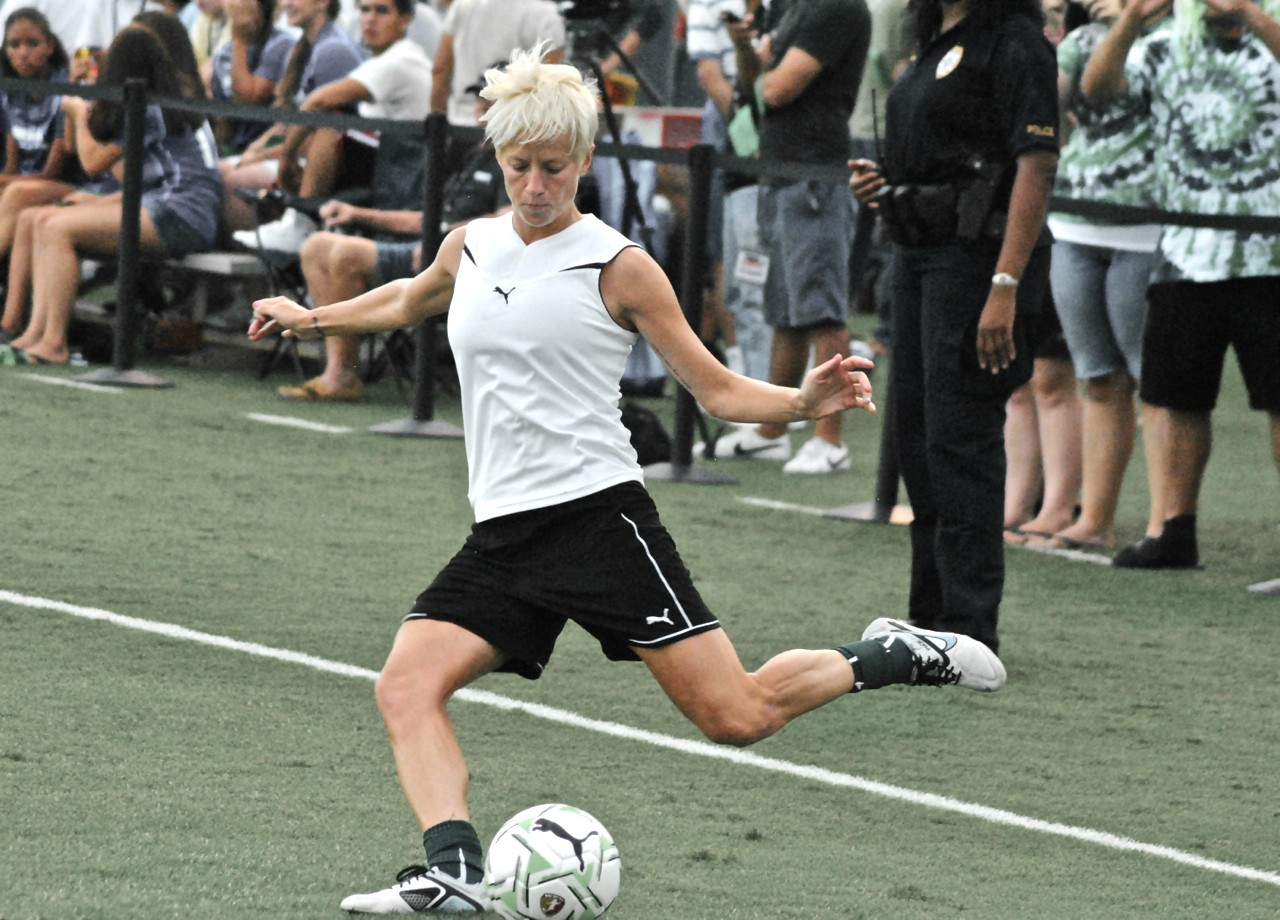
Rapinoe warming up before a MagicJack match in 2011

=== 2011–2012: Sydney FC and Seattle Sounders ===
In October 2011, Rapinoe signed with the Australian W-League team Sydney FC as a guest player for two games. In her second game against Melbourne Victory, she scored with seven minutes remaining to secure Sydney's first win of the 2011–12 season. During the summer of 2012, Rapinoe and fellow national team members Hope Solo, Sydney Leroux, Alex Morgan and Stephanie Cox played on a limited basis with the Seattle Sounders Women between commitments with the national team as they prepared for the 2012 Summer Olympics. Sounders head coach Michelle French described Rapinoe as "one of the most exciting, unpredictable, creative, and flashy players in the women's game." Rapinoe made two appearances during the regular season with the team, serving two assists. With Rapinoe and her national teammates on the team, the Sounders sold out nine of their ten home matches at the 4,500-capacity Starfire Stadium. The average attendance for the Sounders during the 2012 season was four times higher than that of the team with the second-highest attendance.

=== 2013–2014: Lyon ===
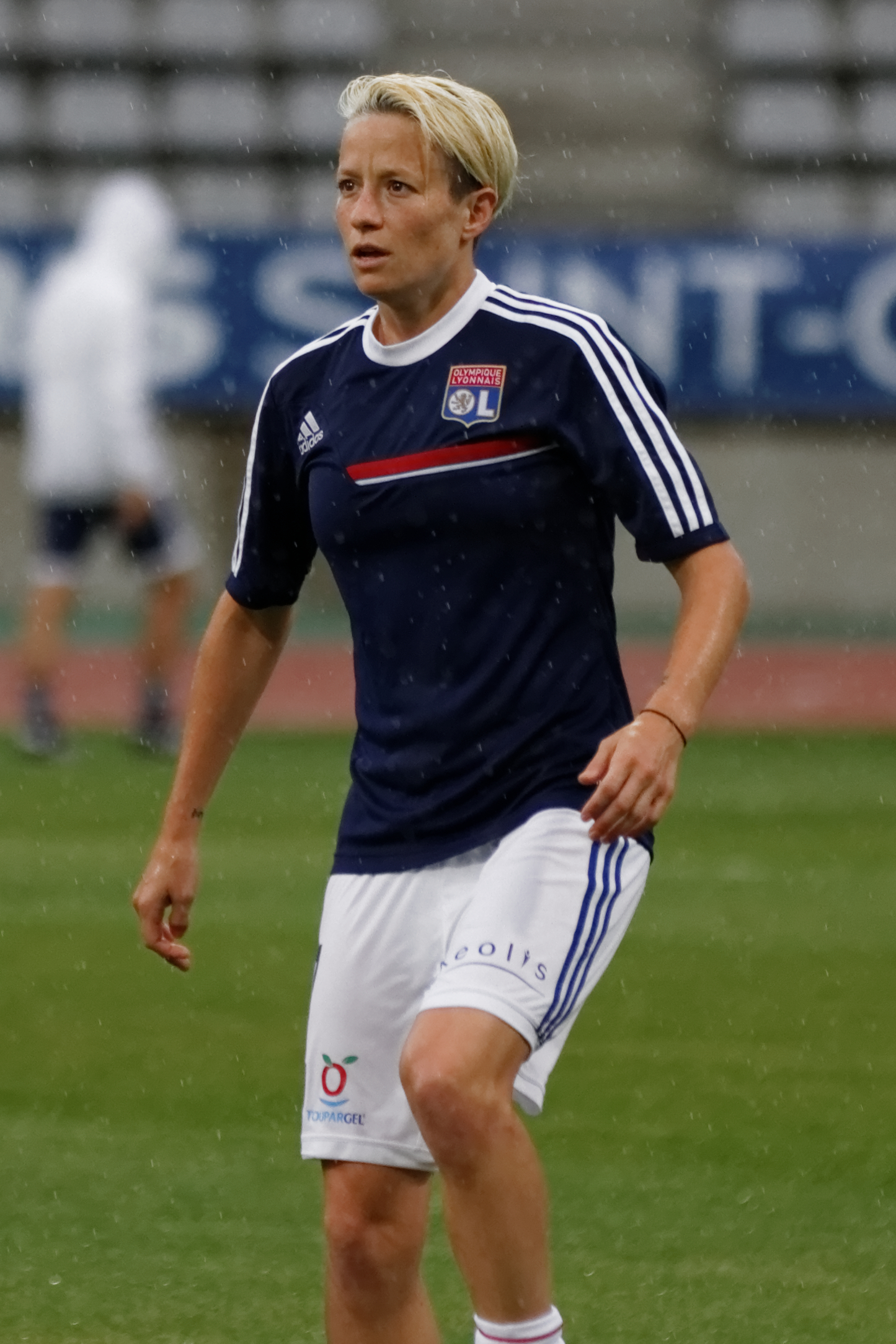
Rapinoe with Olympique Lyonnais in 2013

In January 2013, Rapinoe signed for six months with Olympique Lyonnais, the French club that had previously won six consecutive French league championships and two straight European titles. Rapinoe's monthly salary was reportedly €11,000, (roughly $14,000). Rapinoe played in six regular-season matches for the team, scoring two goals. She played primarily as a left winger in the squad's 4–3–3 formation.

Rapinoe made her UEFA Women's Champions League debut during the 2012–13 quarterfinal against Malmö on March 20, scoring one goal in Lyon's 5–0 victory. She later scored a goal and served an assist in a 6–1 win over Juvisy in the semifinal. Lyon was defeated by VfL Wolfsburg 1–0 in the final. During the 2013–14 season, Rapinoe scored three goals in her eight appearances for the club. During the 2013–14 Champions League, she made four appearances for Lyon and scored one goal. In June 2013, Rapinoe left Lyon earlier than planned to play for Seattle Reign FC. During her time with Lyon, Rapinoe scored eight goals in 28 matches across all competitions.

=== 2013–2023: Seattle Reign ===
In June 2013, Rapinoe joined Seattle Reign FC in the middle of their inaugural season. (Note: Attributed to multiple references:) Before she arrived, the team had been struggling to score goals, and had a 0–9–1 record over the last ten games. With the addition of Rapinoe and Hope Solo, as well as some other lineup changes, the Reign improved their goal-scoring ability and turned their league record around. During a 4–1 victory over the Chicago Red Stars, Rapinoe scored two goals and served one assist, and was named NWSL Player of the Week for week 16. Despite playing only 12 of the Reign's 22 regular-season games, Rapinoe was the team's leading scorer with five goals.

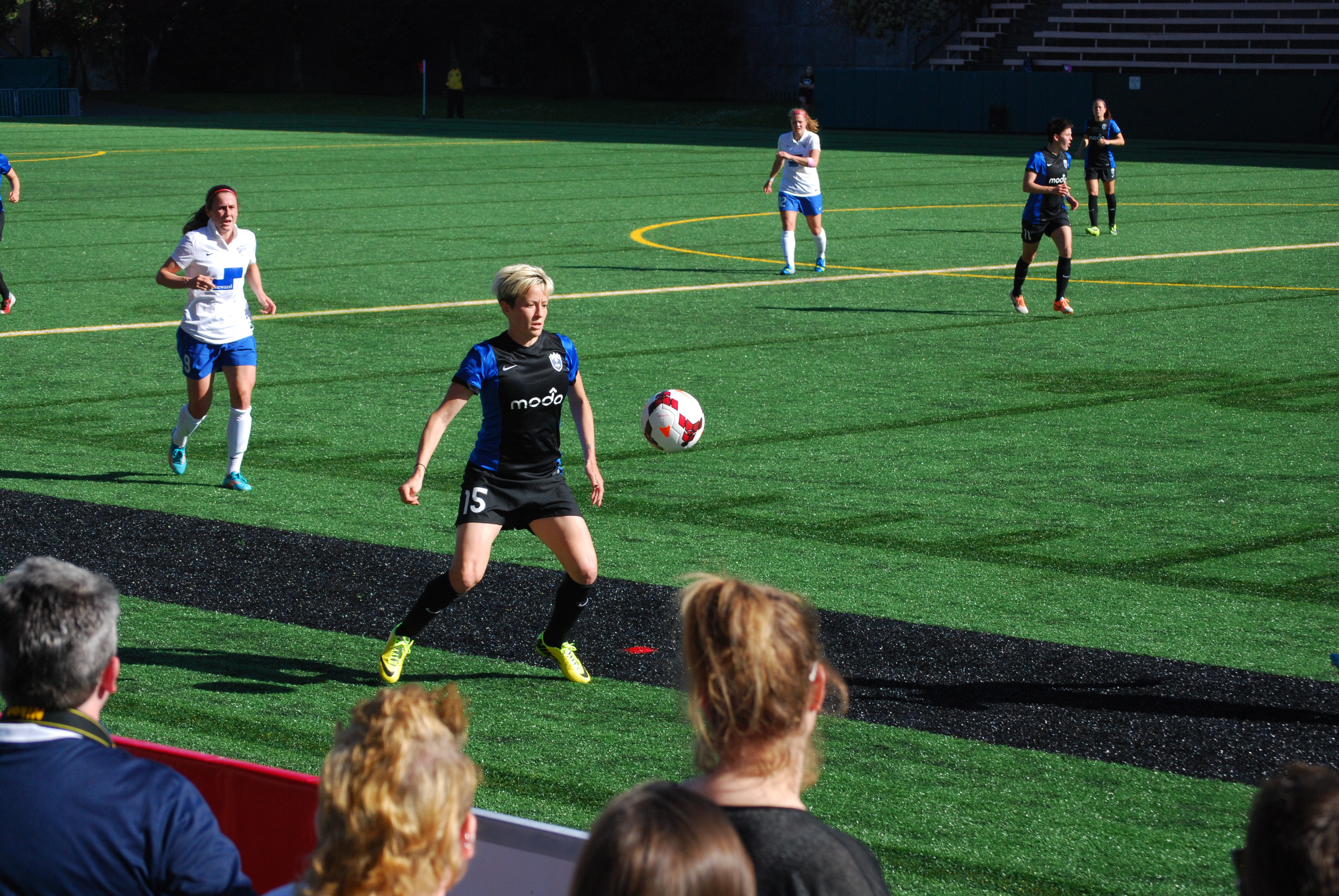
Rapinoe during a game against the Boston Breakers, April 2014

After suffering a foot injury during the first home match of the 2014 season on April 14, Rapinoe sat out several games. She returned to play on July 3 against Western New York Flash. Her four goals and one assist during the season helped the Reign secure the league's regular-season title, the NWSL Shield, with a 16–2–6 record. During the playoff semifinals against Washington Spirit, Rapinoe scored a goal as the Reign won 2–1 and advanced to the championship final against Kansas City. The Reign lost the final 2–1, with Rapinoe scoring one goal.

During the first match of the 2015 season, Rapinoe scored her first professional hat-trick as the Reign defeated the Western New York Flash 5–1. She was named the NWSL Player of the Week for week 1 of the season. Due to her competing in the 2015 FIFA Women's World Cup, she played in 10 of the Reign's twenty regular season games contributing six goals and seven assists. The Reign finished in first place with a 13–3–4 record securing its second consecutive NWSL Shield and advancing to the Playoffs. Rapinoe scored the team's second goal in the 75th minute helping secure the eventual 3-0 win and advancement to the Final where they were defeated 1-0 by Kansas City.

After recovering from her third ACL injury and competing at the 2016 Summer Olympics in Brazil, Rapinoe played in her first 2016 season match on August 27 and scored a goal in a 3-1 win over rival Portland Thorns. On September 4, Rapinoe took to one knee during the national anthem as a symbol of her solidarity with NFL player Colin Kaepernick who had knelt a few days earlier to bring attention to racial injustice. She said afterward, "Being a gay American, I know what it means to look at the flag and not have it protect all of your liberties. It was something small that I could do and something that I plan to keep doing in the future and hopefully spark some meaningful conversation around it." The gesture was considered offensive by some and received support others, including the Reign and other national figures. She finished the season with five appearances, one goal and one assist. The Reign finished in fifth place with an 8–6–6 record.

During her fifth season with Seattle in 2017, Rapinoe led the Reign with 12 goals in 18 appearances and was named the team's Offensive Player of the Year. She recorded multiple goals in four matches, including three braces and a hat trick. Rapinoe was named NWSL Player of the Month for July after scoring five goals in four matches. The Reign finished in fifth place with a 9–8–7 record.

External videos
- Megan Rapinoe Retires From Soccer: Dear Megan, Tribute, Togethxr

In September 2019, the Reign recognized Rapinoe as a Reign Legend. During the 2021 season, Rapinoe co-captained the team with Lauren Barnes and scored six goals in 12 appearances. In August 2021, Rapinoe was named NWSL Player of the Month. The Reign finished in second place during the regular season with a 13–8–3 record; they were eliminated from the NWSL Playoffs by the eventual champions Washington Spirit. On July 8, 2023, Rapinoe announced that she would retire from professional soccer after the 2023 season. Her final home match with the Reign on October 6 drew a league-record attendance of 34,130, and included a ceremony honoring her.

== International career ==
=== Youth national teams ===
Rapinoe played for the U.S. Under-16 team in 2002, traveling with the team to France. She played at the U.S. Youth Soccer Association International Tournament in Houston in May 2003. From 2003 to 2005, Rapinoe played for the national U-19 team, making 21 appearances and scoring nine goals. She played for the team Mexico in March 2003 and in the Netherlands and Germany during a European tour in July of that year. She played in three matches at the 2004 CONCACAF U-19 qualifying tournament, scoring three goals. During the 2004 FIFA U-19 Women's World Championship in Thailand, Rapinoe scored another three goals, including one against Brazil that secured a third-place finish for the United States. (Note: Attributed to multiple references:)

=== Senior national team ===
==== 2006–2009: National team debut and injury recovery ====
Rapinoe trained with the U.S. national team for the first time during the team's 2006 Residency Training Camp in Carson, California. She made her debut for the senior team on July 23, 2006, during a friendly match against Ireland. She scored her first two goals with the team on October 1, 2006, during a friendly against Taiwan. Due to two separate ACL injuries, Rapinoe did not play for the senior team in 2007 or 2008. During the group stage of the 2009 Algarve Cup, Rapinoe scored the game-winning goal in a 1–0 victory over Norway. The U.S. was eventually defeated by Sweden in the final.

==== 2011 FIFA Women's World Cup ====
At the 2010 CONCACAF Women's World Cup Qualifying Tournament, Rapinoe scored four goals and served two assists in three games. After finishing third at the tournament, the U.S. defeated Italy in a play-off series and earned a berth at the 2011 FIFA Women's World Cup. During the second play-off match, Rapinoe assisted the game-winning goal scored by Amy Rodriguez. During a group stage match against Colombia at the World Cup, Rapinoe scored to put the United States up 2–0. She celebrated her goal by picking up an on-field microphone being used for the match's television broadcast and singing Bruce Springsteen's "Born in the U.S.A."

Video
- Rapinoe's cross to Wambach on YouTube

During the World Cup quarterfinal against Brazil, Rapinoe's precise cross allowed Abby Wambach to score an equalizer goal in the 122nd minute of the game, setting a record for the latest goal ever scored in a World Cup match. The play later received ESPN's ESPY Award for Best Play of the Year. With the U.S. and Brazil now tied 2–2 in the quarterfinal, the match went to a penalty shoot-out. Rapinoe scored her penalty kick as the U.S. won the shoot-out and advanced to the semifinals. Following the match, Rapinoe was named ESPN's Next Level Player of the Week for completing five of ten crosses while the rest of the team was 0 for 18. During the World Cup final against Japan—which was broadcast to a record-breaking international television audience—Rapinoe served her third assist of the tournament to Alex Morgan, who scored the game-opening goal. The U.S. tied Japan 2–2, and were defeated 3–1 in a penalty shoot-out. After the World Cup, Rapinoe's hometown of Redding honored her with a parade and declared September 10, 2011 "Megan Rapinoe Day".

==== 2012 London Olympics ====
At the 2012 Olympic Games in London, Rapinoe scored once in her team's 3–0 group stage victory over Colombia. She scored two goals in the semifinal as the U.S. defeated Canada 4–3. Her first goal of the semifinal was scored directly from a corner kick. She was the first player of any gender to score what is termed an "Olimpico" goal at the Olympics, and is still the only player to have accomplished it. Rapinoe is one of only five female players who have scored two goals during an Olympic semifinal.

Video
- Rapinoe's "Olimpico" goal on YouTube

The U.S. won the gold medal after defeating Japan 2–1 at Wembley Stadium in front of 80,203 spectators—the largest crowd ever for a women's Olympic soccer game. Rapinoe served one assist during the final, and finished the tournament with three goals and four assists. Widely regarded as one of the top players of the 2012 Olympics, Rapinoe was named to numerous "Team of the Tournament" lists including those selected by the BBC and All White Kit. Rapinoe achieved a career-best eight goals and 12 assists for the national team in 2012.

==== 2013–2014 ====
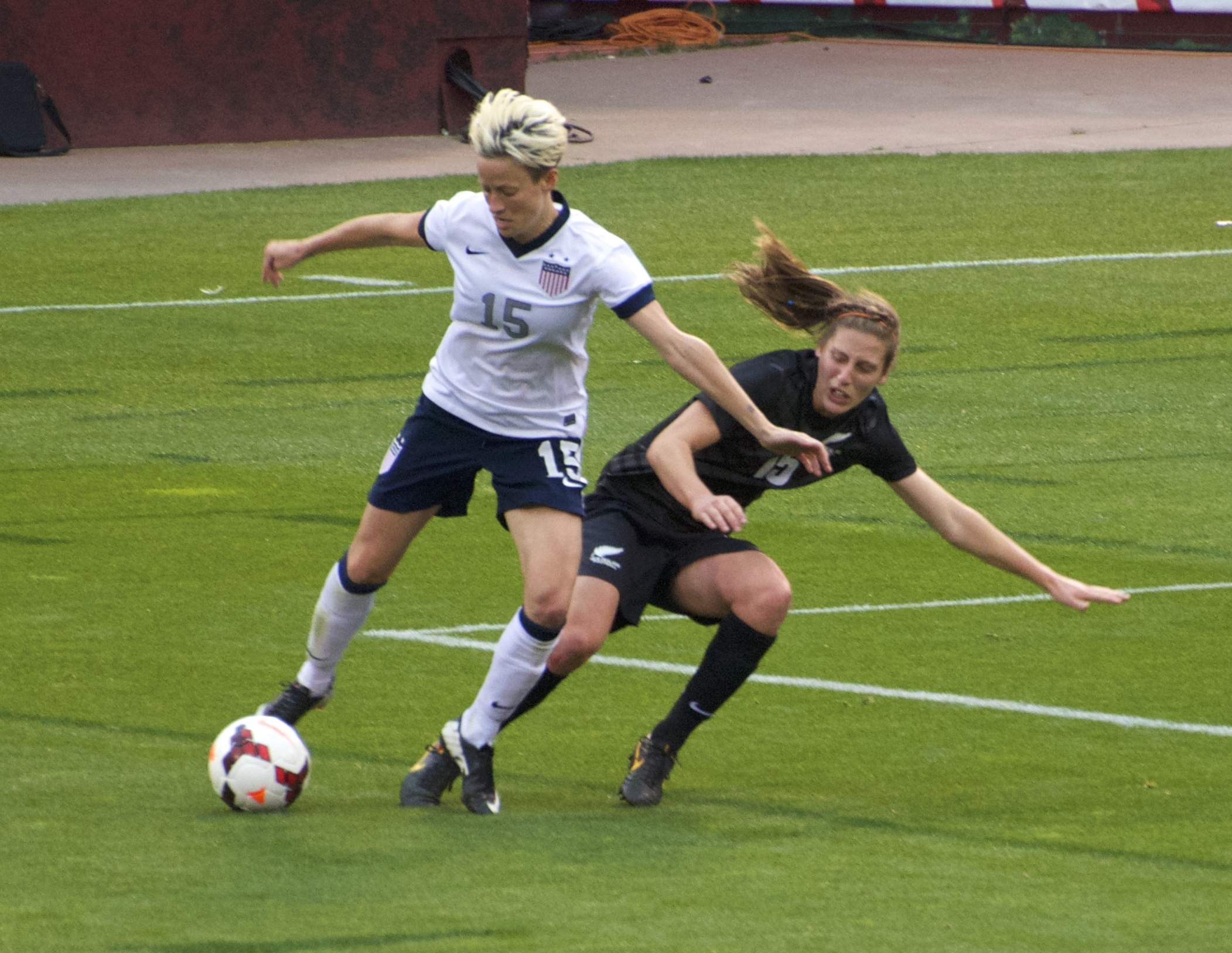
Rapinoe battles for the ball during a friendly match against New Zealand in 2013.

At the 2013 Algarve Cup in Portugal, Rapinoe was named the Player of the Tournament, despite playing in only two of the four matches in which the U.S. competed. She was injured in practice and did not play during the final as the team defeated Germany to win the tournament. During a friendly match against South Korea on June 20, Rapinoe's corner kick ended up being the assist for Abby Wambach's 159th international goal, which set a new world record for most international goals scored by a player of any gender. During a friendly against New Zealand in October, Rapinoe scored the game-opening goal on a direct free kick to help the U.S. win 4–1. Rapinoe was named Player of the Match.

==== 2015 FIFA Women's World Cup ====
Five of the six stadiums used for the 2015 Women's World Cup in Canada utilized artificial turf. It was the first World Cup, for men or women, to use turf instead of grass. Rapinoe criticized the use of turf, stating that grass is essential to maintain the quality and "purity" of the game. In the United States' first group stage match against Australia, Rapinoe scored twice as her team achieved a 3–1 victory. (Note: Attributed to multiple references:) The U.S. went on to win the tournament. During training for a Victory Tour match to celebrate the World Cup win, Rapinoe tore her ACL. Following the victory, Rapinoe and her teammates became the first women's sports team to be honored with a ticker tape parade in New York City. Each player received a key to the city from Mayor Bill de Blasio. In October, the team was honored by President Barack Obama at the White House.

==== 2019 FIFA Women's World Cup ====
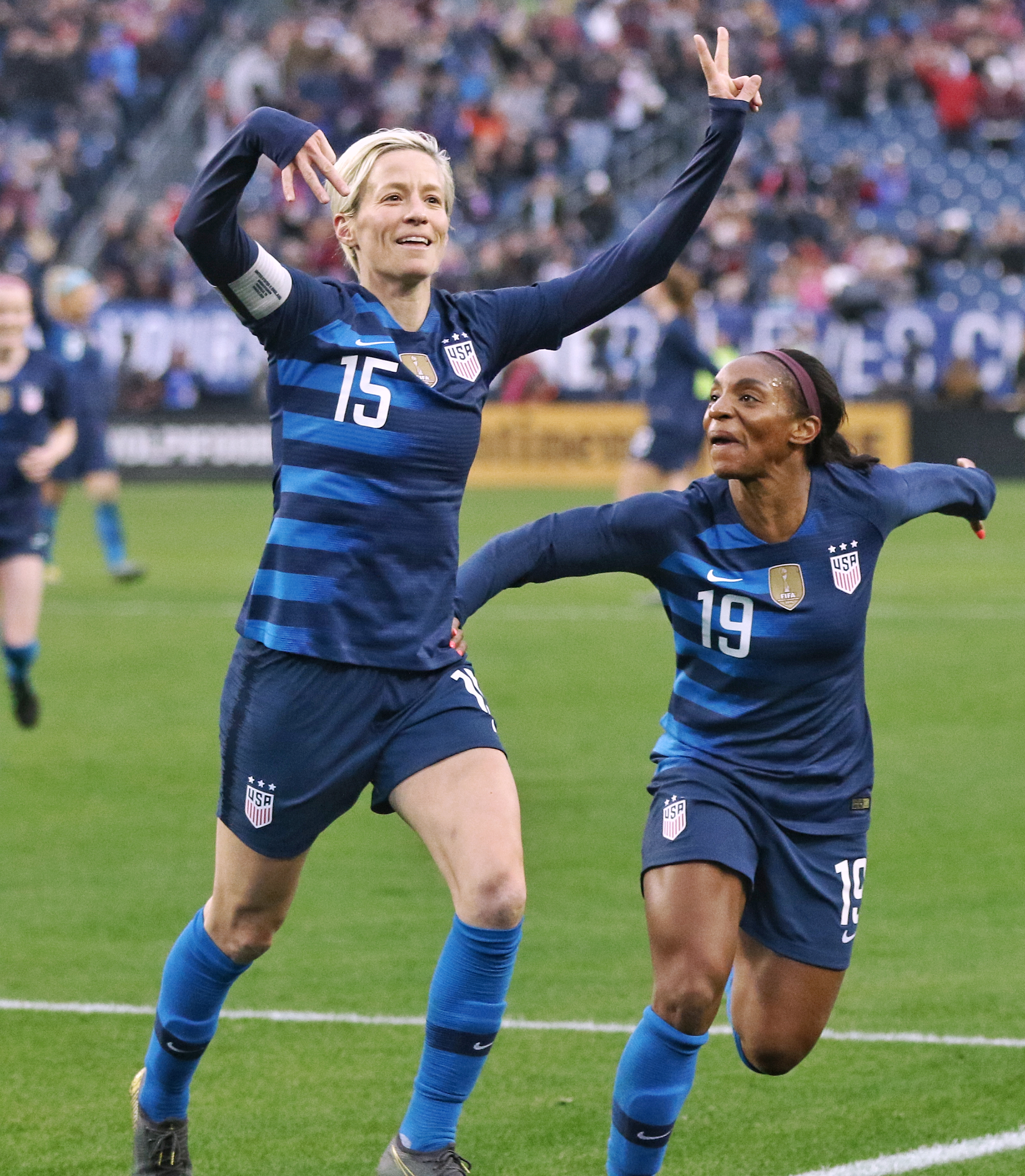
Rapinoe celebrates a goal with Crystal Dunn during the 2019 FIFA Women's World Cup semifinal against England.

Rapinoe co-captained the national team alongside Carli Lloyd and Alex Morgan from 2018 to 2020. The 2019 Women's World Cup was Rapinoe's third World Cup appearance. In a 13–0 win over Thailand during the group stage, she scored a goal. During the knockout stage, she scored twice in a 2–1 victory over Spain. In the quarterfinal, she scored another two goals as the U.S. defeated France. Rapinoe was named Player of the Match by FIFA for her performances in the round of 16 and the quarterfinal.

Due to an injured hamstring, Rapinoe was forced to sit out during the United States' semifinal victory over England, but she recovered in time to start in the final against the Netherlands. She scored her 50th international goal on a penalty kick in the 61st minute. After a second goal by teammate Rose Lavelle, the U.S. won the match 2–0 and achieved a second consecutive World Cup victory. At age 34, Rapinoe was the oldest woman to score in a World Cup final and was named Player of the Match. She received the Golden Boot as the top scorer of the tournament with six goals, as well as the Golden Ball as the best player of the tournament. Following the victory, New York City honored the national team with a ticker tape parade. Rapinoe and her teammates were invited to Washington, D.C. by Senator Chuck Schumer and Congresswomen Alexandria Ocasio-Cortez, Ayanna Pressley and Nancy Pelosi.

==== 2021–2023: Tokyo Olympics and 2023 FIFA Women's World Cup ====
On August 5, 2021, Rapinoe scored two goals—including her second career "Olimpico" goal—during a 4–3 win over Australia at the 2020 Summer Olympics in Tokyo, which had been postponed until 2021. The victory earned the United States the bronze medal. In February 2022, the U.S. national team coach, Vlatko Andonovski, announced that Rapinoe would not be included on the roster for the SheBelieves Cup. On July 8, 2023, Rapinoe stated that the 2023 Women's World Cup in Australia would be her last major tournament, and that she would retire from professional soccer at the end of the year. On August 6, the U.S. was eliminated from the tournament during the round of 16.

== Endorsements ==
Rapinoe had endorsement deals with Nike and Samsung. (Note: Attributed to multiple references:) In 2013, she appeared in advertisements for the clothing company Wildfang and began a partnership with the medical device company DJO Global. In 2016, she appeared in television commercials and print advertisements for Vitamin Water, and was featured in a Nike commercial starring Cristiano Ronaldo. In 2019, she was sponsored by Procter & Gamble, BodyArmor, Hulu, LUNA Bar, and VISA. In 2021, she was announced as one of the new faces of Victoria's Secret, and appeared in advertisements for Subway. Rapinoe co-starred in a commercial for ESPN's SportsCenter in January 2023 with Becky Sauerbrunn and Sophia Wilson. In July 2023, she starred in a television commercial for Google Pixel.

== Activism ==
Rapinoe with the US national team standing during the national anthem before a 2019 Victory Tour match

On September 4, 2016, Rapinoe knelt during the U.S. national anthem at a NWSL match in solidarity with National Football League player Colin Kaepernick and his protests against racial injustice in the United States. (Note: Attributed to multiple references:) In a post-match interview, she stated: "Being a gay American, I know what it means to look at the flag and not have it protect all of your liberties. It was something small that I could do and something that I plan to keep doing in the future and hopefully spark some meaningful conversation around it." Later that week, managers of the Washington Spirit prevented Rapinoe from carrying out her kneeling protest during a game between the Spirit and the Reign in Washington, D.C. The Spirit managers, who felt Rapinoe's protests were disrespectful, played the anthem before players entered the field, so she could not "hijack" the ceremony.

On September 15, Rapinoe knelt during the anthem at an international match against Thailand. (Note: Attributed to multiple references:) U.S. Soccer then issued a statement saying they expected players to stand for the anthem. During the 2015 World Cup, Rapinoe stood in silence for the national anthem. Her teammate, Hope Solo, claimed that Rapinoe almost bullied players into kneeling during the anthem, but Solo did not specify when this occurred. In a 2019 interview, Rapinoe expressed displeasure with the stance of U.S. Soccer and said she would probably never sing the national anthem again.

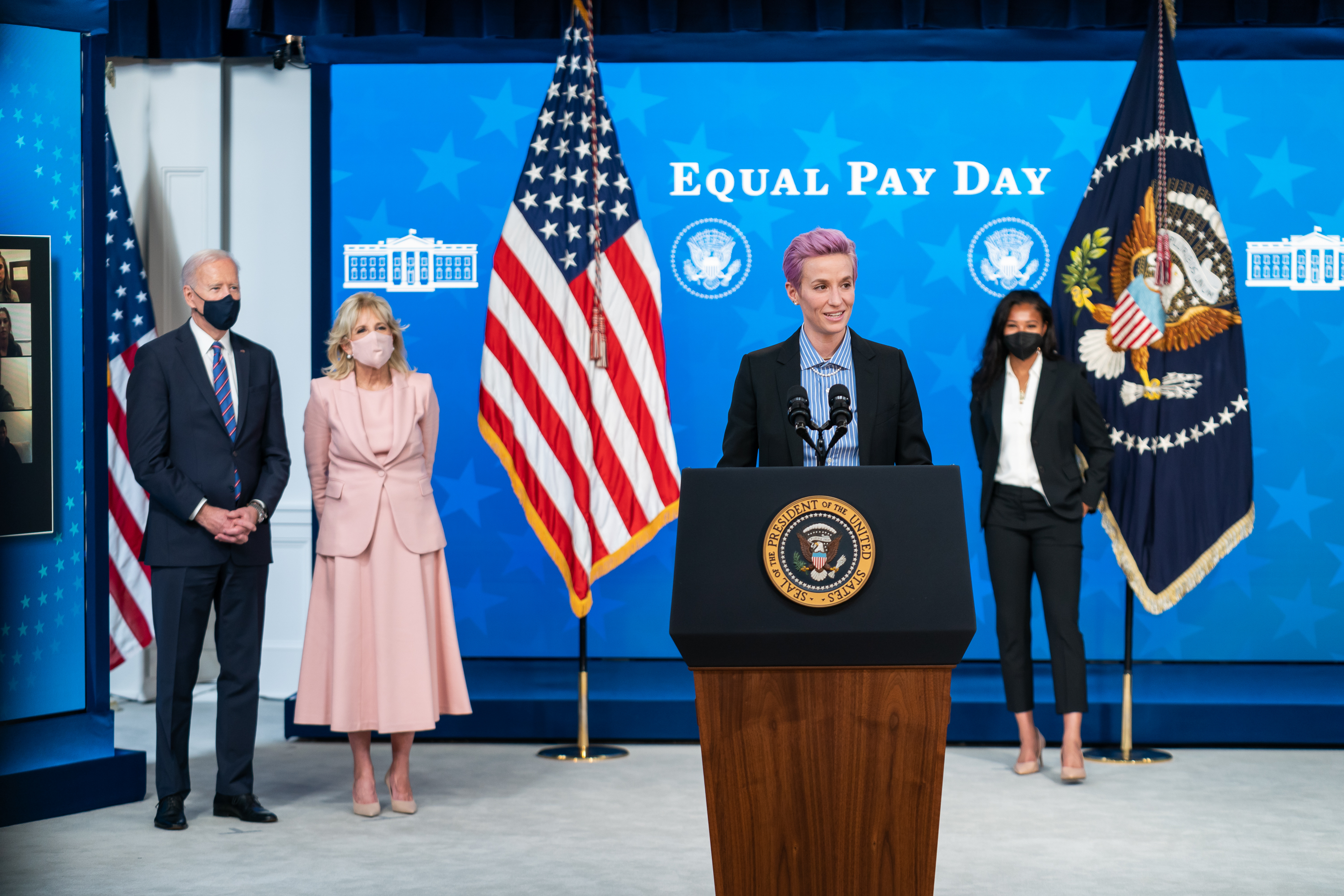
Rapinoe speaks on equal pay at the White House in March 2021.

Rapinoe has been involved in the women's team's equal pay complaint to the Equal Employment Opportunity Commission since at least 2016. In March 2019, she, along with 27 of her U.S. Women's soccer teammates filed a lawsuit against the United States Soccer Federation accusing it of gender discrimination, hoping to achieve equal pay. In May of the following year, a judge dismissed key parts of the lawsuit, including the complaint over receiving lower pay than the U.S. men's team, but allowed other claims to move to trial.

Rapinoe is a longtime advocate for the inclusion of transgender women in women's sports. She has characterized attempts to exclude transgender women as an effort to "legislate away people's full humanity". (Note: Attributed to multiple references:)

== In popular culture ==
=== Print media ===
Rapinoe was profiled in the July 2012 edition of Out and in the August 6, 2012, edition of Sports Illustrated. She was featured on the cover of the March 2013 edition of Curve. The April 11, 2013, edition of The New York Times featured an article that discussed her experience of coming out publicly before the 2012 Olympics. In 2019, she became the first openly gay woman in the annual Sports Illustrated Swimsuit Issue. She was featured on multiple covers of Sports Illustrated, Marie Claire, and InStyle the same year. In 2020, Rapinoe published an autobiography, One Life, which details her early life, her career highlights and setbacks, her activism for racial and gender equality and her personal relationships. The book became a New York Times best seller and was optioned by Sony Pictures Television.

=== Film and television ===
Rapinoe has made appearances on The Daily Show with Jon Stewart, The Today Show, The Rachel Maddow Show, Meet the Press, Good Morning America and Jimmy Kimmel Live, and voiced herself in an episode of The Simpsons' thirty-sixth season. In 2012, she appeared in an ESPN feature called Title IX is Mine: USWNT, and was the focus of a Fox Soccer feature called Fox Soccer Exclusive: Megan Rapinoe.

In 2016, Rapinoe starred with national teammates Hope Solo and Crystal Dunn in a documentary series called Keeping Score, which was broadcast by Fullscreen. The series follows the athletes as they prepare for the 2016 Rio Olympics and addresses issues such as equal pay and racism. Rapinoe, Serena Williams, Simone Biles, Ibtihaj Muhammad, Chloe Kim and other women athletes were featured in Nike's "Dream Crazier" advertisement, which was shown during the 91st Academy Awards in February 2019. Later that year, Rapinoe made a cameo appearance on Showtime's The L Word: Generation Q. In 2023, Rapinoe appeared in the Netflix documentary series Under Pressure, which follows the U.S. women's national team as they prepare for the 2023 FIFA Women's World Cup.

=== Fashion, games and toys ===
According to Vogue, Rapinoe has developed her own signature look and possesses the swagger and attitude of a style icon. The Guardian said Rapinoe has a "diverse approach to clothes" and referred to her as "an expert in mixing and matching." In 2020, Rapinoe became the spokeswoman for the luxury fashion brand Loewe, and in 2022 she partnered with Nike to create a clothing collection called "Victory Redefined". Rapinoe appears in the FIFA video game series starting with FIFA 16, the first edition which features women players. In 2023, Rapinoe was included in the LEGO Icons of Play set.

== Personal life ==
=== Relationships ===
Rapinoe knew she was a lesbian by her first year in college. She publicly came out in the July 2012 edition of Out magazine, stating that she had been in a relationship with Australian soccer player Sarah Walsh since 2009. After five years together, Rapinoe and Walsh ended their relationship in 2013. Rapinoe then dated the singer-songwriter Sera Cahoone. Rapinoe and Cahoone announced their engagement in August 2015. In January 2017, Rapinoe said their wedding plans were on hold.

On July 20, 2017, Rapinoe and basketball player Sue Bird of Seattle Storm confirmed that they had been dating since late 2016. In 2018, Bird and Rapinoe became the first same-sex couple on the cover of ESPN's The Body Issue. They announced their engagement on October 30, 2020. In April 2026, Rapinoe and Bird announced they had separated after 10 years as a couple.

In a 2020 interview with Terry Gross on Fresh Air, Rapinoe discussed the drug abuse of her older brother Brian, who had inspired her to play soccer when they were children. She explained that during his incarceration, he became involved with white supremacist groups in prison.

=== Philanthropy ===
Rapinoe has done philanthropic work for the Gay, Lesbian & Straight Education Network and the United States Olympic & Paralympic Committee. (Note: Attributed to multiple references:) In 2013, she became an ambassador for Athlete Ally, a nonprofit organization that focuses on ending homophobia and transphobia in sports. In September 2017, Rapinoe and U.S. teammate Alex Morgan were the first two women soccer players to sign on to the "Common Goal" campaign created by Juan Mata of Manchester United. As participants in the campaign, players donate one percent of their individual wages to soccer-related charities.

=== Politics ===
In December 2019, Rapinoe endorsed Elizabeth Warren in the 2020 Democratic Party presidential primaries. During the opening night of the 2020 Democratic National Convention, Rapinoe hosted a panel with frontline workers of the COVID-19 pandemic. Rapinoe was one of several athletes to criticize the U.S. Supreme Court's decision to overturn Roe v. Wade in June 2022. She had been one of 500 former and current athletes who signed an amicus brief supporting abortion rights for the Supreme Court case in September 2021.

== Career statistics ==
=== Club ===
As of matches played October 21, 2023

Appearances and goals by club, season and competition
Club	Season	League			Cup		Continental		Total	
Club	Season	Division	Apps	Goals	Apps	Goals	Apps	Goals	Apps	Goals
Chicago Red Stars	2009	WPS	18	2	—		—		18	2
Chicago Red Stars	2010	WPS	20	1	—		—		20	1
Chicago Red Stars	Total		38	3	—		—		38	3
Philadelphia Independence	2011	WPS	4	1	—		—		4	1
MagicJack	2011	WPS	10	3	—		—		10	3
Sydney	2011–12	W-League	2	1	—		—		2	1
Seattle Sounders	2012	USL W-League	2	0	—		—		2	0
Seattle Sounders	Total		18	5	—		—		18	5
Lyon	2012–13	D1F	6	2	—		5	2	11	4
Lyon	2013–14	D1F	8	3	—		4	1	12	4
Lyon	Total		14	5	—		9	3	23	8
Seattle Reign FC	2013	NWSL	12	5	—		—		12	5
Seattle Reign FC	2014	NWSL	9	4	—		2	2	11	6
Seattle Reign FC	2015	NWSL	10	5	—		2	1	12	6
Seattle Reign FC	2016	NWSL	5	1	—		—		5	1
Seattle Reign FC	2017	NWSL	18	12	—		—		18	12
Seattle Reign FC	2018	NWSL	17	7	—		—		17	7
Seattle Reign FC	2019	NWSL	6	0	—		—		6	0
Seattle Reign FC	2020	NWSL	—		—		—		—	
Seattle Reign FC	2021	NWSL	11	6	2	0	0	0	13	6
Seattle Reign FC	2022	NWSL	14	7	1	0	0	0	15	7
Seattle Reign FC	2023	NWSL	15	5	1	0	—		16	5
Seattle Reign FC	Total		117	52	4	0	4	3	125	55
Career total			187	65	4	0	13	6	203	71

=== International goals ===
Scores and results list the United States' goal tally first, score column indicates score after each Rapinoe goal.

List of international goals scored by Megan Rapinoe
No.	Date	Venue	Opponent	Score	Result	Competition	Ref.
1	October 1, 2006	Carson, California	Chinese Taipei	9–0	10–0	Friendly	
2	October 1, 2006	Carson, California	Chinese Taipei	10–0	10–0	Friendly	
3	March 9, 2009	Ferreiras, Portugal	Norway	1–0	1–0	2009 Algarve Cup	
4	May 25, 2009	Toronto, Canada	Canada	2–0	4–0	Friendly	
5	July 17, 2010	Hartford, Connecticut	Sweden	1–0	3–0	Friendly	
6	October 2, 2010	Kennesaw, Georgia	China	1–0	2–1	Friendly	
7	October 30, 2010	Cancún, Mexico	Guatemala	2–0	9–0	2010 World Cup qualifier	
8	October 30, 2010	Cancún, Mexico	Guatemala	5–0	9–0	2010 World Cup qualifier	
9	March 2, 2011	Santo Antonio, Portugal	Japan	2–0	2–1	2011 Algarve Cup	
10	April 2, 2011	London, England	England	1–2	1–2	Friendly	
11	July 2, 2011	Sinsheim, Germany	Colombia	2–0	3–0	2011 FIFA World Cup	
12	January 22, 2012	Vancouver, Canada	Guatemala	11–0	13–0	2012 Olympic qualifier	
13	July 28, 2012	Glasgow, Scotland	Colombia	1–0	3–0	2012 Summer Olympics	
14	August 6, 2012	Manchester, England	Canada	1–1	4–3	2012 Summer Olympics	
15	August 6, 2012	Manchester, England	Canada	2–2	4–3	2012 Summer Olympics	
16	September 1, 2012	Rochester, New York	Costa Rica	1–0	8–0	Friendly	
17	September 1, 2012	Rochester, New York	Costa Rica	5–0	8–0	Friendly	
18	December 1, 2012	Glendale, Arizona	Republic of Ireland	2–0	2–0	Friendly	
19	December 15, 2012	Boca Raton, Florida	China	2–0	4–1	Friendly	
20	February 13, 2013	Nashville, Tennessee	Scotland	1–0	3–1	Friendly	
21	March 8, 2013	Albufeira, Portugal	China	3–0	5–0	2013 Algarve Cup	
22	April 5, 2013	Offenbach, Germany	Germany	2–0	3–3	Friendly	
23	October 27, 2013	San Francisco, California	New Zealand	1–0	4–1	Friendly	
24	March 10, 2014	Albufeira, Portugal	Denmark	3–4	3–5	2014 Algarve Cup	
25	April 6, 2014	Commerce City, Colorado	China	2–0	2–0	Friendly	
26	August 20, 2014	Cary, North Carolina	Switzerland	1–0	4–1	Friendly	
27	September 19, 2014	Rochester, New York	Mexico	2–0	4–0	Friendly	
28	October 17, 2014	Chicago, Illinois	Guatemala	5–0	5–0	2014 World Cup qualifier	
29	December 14, 2014	Brasília, Brazil	Brazil	2–0	2–3	2014 Tournament of Brasilia	
30	June 8, 2015	Winnipeg, Canada	Australia	1–0	3–1	2015 FIFA World Cup	
31	June 8, 2015	Winnipeg, Canada	Australia	3–1	3–1	2015 FIFA World Cup	
32	July 31, 2017	San Diego, California	Brazil	3–3	4–3	2017 Tournament of Nations	
33	August 3, 2017	Carson, California	Japan	1–0	3–0	2017 Tournament of Nations	
34	October 19, 2017	New Orleans, Louisiana	South Korea	3–1	3–1	Friendly	
35	March 2, 2018	Columbus, Ohio	Germany	1–0	1–0	2018 SheBelieves Cup	
36	April 8, 2018	Houston, Texas	Mexico	5–2	6–2	Friendly	
37	June 12, 2018	Cleveland, Ohio	China	1–0	2–1	Friendly	
38	July 26, 2018	Kansas City, Kansas	Japan	4–1	4–2	2018 Tournament of Nations	
39	October 4, 2018	Cary, North Carolina	Mexico	4–0	6–0	2018 CONCACAF Championship	
40	October 4, 2018	Cary, North Carolina	Mexico	5–0	6–0	2018 CONCACAF Championship	
41	October 14, 2018	Frisco, Texas	Jamaica	2–0	6–0	2018 CONCACAF Championship	
42	February 27, 2019	Chester, Pennsylvania	Japan	1–0	2–2	2019 SheBelieves Cup	
43	March 2, 2019	Nashville, Tennessee	England	1–0	2–2	2019 SheBelieves Cup	
44	April 4, 2019	Commerce City, Colorado	Australia	3–2	5–3	Friendly	
45	June 11, 2019	Reims, France	Thailand	9–0	13–0	2019 FIFA World Cup	
46	June 24, 2019	Reims, France	Spain	1–0	2–1	2019 FIFA World Cup	
47	June 24, 2019	Reims, France	Spain	2–1	2–1	2019 FIFA World Cup	
48	June 28, 2019	Paris, France	France	1–0	2–1	2019 FIFA World Cup	
49	June 28, 2019	Paris, France	France	2–0	2–1	2019 FIFA World Cup	
50	July 7, 2019	Lyon, France	Netherlands	1–0	2–0	2019 FIFA World Cup	
51	February 9, 2020	Carson, California	Canada	3–0	3–0	2020 Olympic qualifier	
52	March 11, 2020	Frisco, Texas	Japan	1–0	3–1	2020 SheBelieves Cup	
53	January 22, 2021	Orlando, Florida	Colombia	2–0	6–0	Friendly	
54	January 22, 2021	Orlando, Florida	Colombia	3–0	6–0	Friendly	
55	February 21, 2021	Orlando, Florida	Brazil	2–0	2–0	2021 SheBelieves Cup	
56	February 24, 2021	Orlando, Florida	Argentina	1–0	6–0	2021 SheBelieves Cup	
57	February 24, 2021	Orlando, Florida	Argentina	2–0	6–0	2021 SheBelieves Cup	
58	April 10, 2021	Stockholm, Sweden	Sweden	1–1	1–1	Friendly	
59	April 13, 2021	Le Havre, France	France	1–0	2–0	Friendly	
60	August 5, 2021	Kashima, Japan	Australia	1–0	4–3	2020 Summer Olympics	
61	August 5, 2021	Kashima, Japan	Australia	2–1	4–3	2020 Summer Olympics	
62	October 26, 2021	Saint Paul, Minnesota	South Korea	4–0	6–0	Friendly	
63	November 10, 2022	Fort Lauderdale, Florida	Germany	1–1	1–2	Friendly	

== Honors ==
Lyon

- Division 1 Féminine: 2012–13
- Coupe de France Féminine: 2012–13

Seattle Reign FC

- 3x NWSL Shield: 2014, 2015, 2022

United States

- 2x FIFA Women's World Cup champion: 2015, 2019
- Olympic gold medal: 2012
- Olympic bronze medal: 2021
- 3x Algarve Cup champion: 2011, 2013, 2015
- 3x CONCACAF Women's Championship champion: 2014, 2018, 2022
- 4x SheBelieves Cup champion: 2018, 2020, 2021, 2023
- Tournament of Nations champion: 2018
- CONCACAF Women's Olympic Qualifying Tournament: 2020

Individual

- Algarve Cup Player of the Tournament: 2013
- 6x NWSL Player of the Week: 2013, 2015, 2017 (x2), 2018 (x2)
- 4x NWSL Second XI: 2013, 2015, 2017, 2019
- NWSL Best XI: 2018
- IFFHS World's Best Woman Playmaker: 2019
- IFFHS Women's World Team: 2019
- The Best FIFA Women's Player: 2019
- FIFA Women's World Cup Golden Ball: 2019 (Note: Attributed to multiple references:)
- FIFA Women's World Cup Golden Boot: 2019 (Note: Attributed to multiple references:)
- FIFPro World XI: 2019, 2020
- FIFA Women's World Cup Final Player of the Match: 2019
- Ballon d'Or Féminin: 2019
- IFFHS CONCACAF Woman Team of the Decade 2011–2020
- National Soccer Hall of Fame: 2027

Other

- Harry Glickman Professional Female Athlete of the Year award: 2012
- Los Angeles LGBT Center Board of Directors Award: 2012
- Shasta County Sports Hall of Fame: 2014
- National Gay and Lesbian Sports Hall of Fame: 2015
- Seattle Sounders FC Golden Scarf: 2015
- ESPY Award for Best Team: 2015, 2019 as a member of the USWNT
- Sports Illustrated Sportsperson of the Year: 2019
- Best in Sports Shorty Award: 2020
- Time 100 Most Influential People: 2020
- ESPY Award for Best Play: 2011, 2021
- Presidential Medal of Freedom: 2022

== See also ==
- List of Presidential Medal of Freedom recipients
- List of FIFA Women's World Cup winning players
- List of Olympic medalists in soccer
- List of soccer players with 100 or more caps
- List of LGBTQ sportspeople
- The 100 Best Female Footballers in the World
- List of Seattle Reign FC players
- List of foreign A-League Women players
- List of foreign Première Ligue players
- List of most expensive association football transfers
