= Hope Solo =

American soccer player (born 1981)

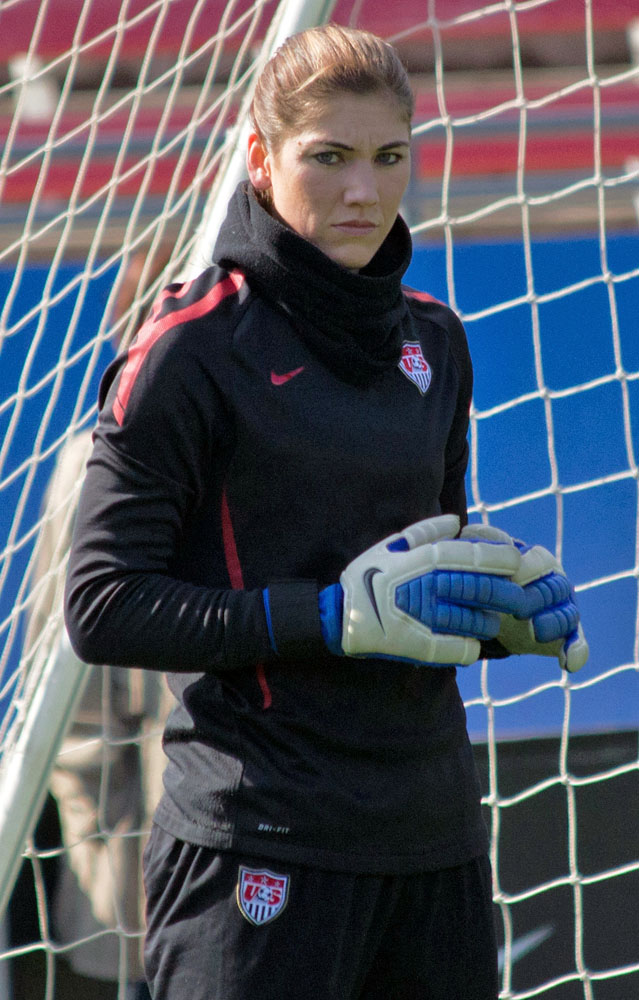
- Solo in training for the United States in 2012

Personal information
- Full name: Hope Amelia Stevens
- Birth name: Hope Amelia Solo
- Date of birth: July 30, 1981 (age 45)
- Place of birth: Richland, Washington, U.S.
- Height: 5 ft 9 in (1.75 m)
- Position: Goalkeeper

Youth career
- 1996–2000: Richland High School

College career
| Years | Team | Apps | (Gls) |
| 1999–2002 | Washington Huskies | 68 | (0) |

Senior career*
| Years | Team | Apps | (Gls) |
| 2003 | Philadelphia Charge | 8 | (0) |
| 2004 | Kopparbergs/Göteborg | 19 | (0) |
| 2005 | Lyon | 7 | (0) |
| 2009–2010 | Saint Louis Athletica | 23 | (0) |
| 2010 | Atlanta Beat | 16 | (0) |
| 2011 | magicJack | 4 | (0) |
| 2012 | Seattle Sounders Women | 3 | (0) |
| 2013–2016 | Seattle Reign | 54 | (0) |
| Total | | 134 | (0) |

International career
| 1996–1997 | United States U16 | | |
| 1998 | United States U19 | | |
| 1999–2000 | United States U21 | | |
| 2000–2016 | United States | 202 | (0) |
Medal record
Women's soccer
Representing United States
Olympic Games
| Gold medal – first place | 2008 Beijing | Team |
| Gold medal – first place | 2012 London | Team |
FIFA Women's World Cup
| Winner | 2015 Canada |
| Runner-up | 2011 Germany |
| Bronze medal – third place | 2007 China |
- * Club domestic league appearances and goals

Hope Amelia Stevens (née Solo; born July 30, 1981) is an American former soccer goalkeeper who represented the United States from 2000 to 2016. She is a World Cup champion and two-time Olympic gold medalist. Solo is regarded as one of the top female goalkeepers of all time and currently holds the U.S. record for most career shutouts.

After playing at the collegiate level for the University of Washington, she played professionally for the Philadelphia Charge in the Women's United Soccer Association (WUSA). When the WUSA folded after her first season, she traveled to Europe to play for the top division leagues in Sweden and France. From 2009 to 2011, she played in the Women's Professional Soccer (WPS) for Saint Louis Athletica, Atlanta Beat and magicJack. After the WPS ceased operations in early 2012, she played for the Seattle Sounders in the W-League. She most recently played for Seattle Reign FC in the National Women's Soccer League, the top division of women's soccer in the United States.

Solo was the starting goalkeeper for the majority of the 2007 FIFA Women's World Cup and helped lead the U.S. national team to the semifinals having given up only two goals in four games, including three consecutive shutouts. After a controversial move made by head coach Greg Ryan to bench Solo in favor of veteran goalkeeper Briana Scurry for the semifinal, in which the United States was defeated 4–0 by Brazil, Solo made headlines with post-game remarks that resulted in many teammates shunning her. She later rebounded to help the United States win gold medals at the 2008 and 2012 Summer Olympics. During the 2011 FIFA Women's World Cup, her goalkeeping skills were highlighted, especially during a quarter-final match against Brazil, which the U.S. won on penalty kicks. Although the team lost to Japan in a match that ended in penalties, Solo received the Golden Glove award for best goalkeeper as well as the Bronze Ball award for her overall performance at the tournament.

Following her performance at the 2011 World Cup, Solo participated in the television show Dancing with the Stars and posed for various magazines, most notably the "Body Issue" of ESPN The Magazine. After the 2012 London Olympics, where she received her second Olympic gold medal, she published her bestselling autobiography Solo: A Memoir of Hope.

As the starting goalkeeper at the 2015 FIFA Women's World Cup, Solo helped the U.S. win the national team's third World Cup championship since 1991. The final against Japan was the most-watched televised soccer game ever in the United States.

As of August 6, 2016, Solo holds several U.S. goalkeeper records including appearances (202), starts (190), wins (153), shutouts (102), wins in a season (26), consecutive minutes played (1,256), and longest undefeated streak (55 games).

== Early life ==
Solo was born in Richland, Washington on July 30, 1981, to Judy Lynn (née Shaw) and Jeffrey Solo. Her father, an Italian-American Vietnam War veteran, who was in and out of her life as a child and teenager, taught her how to play soccer at a young age. When Solo was seven, her father picked her and her brother Marcus up to go to a baseball game in the nearby city of Yakima, but ended up driving over three hours west to Seattle, where they stayed for several days at a hotel. Solo described how it seemed like a vacation at first, but soon realized it was not. Police later found them at a downtown bank and arrested Jeffrey for alleged kidnapping. Although her parents had divorced when she was six and she lived with her mother, Solo maintained a close relationship with her father after reconnecting with him during her college years at the University of Washington. He continued to be a major influence in her life until his death of a heart attack in June 2007.

As a forward at Richland High School, Solo scored 109 goals, leading her team to three consecutive league titles from 1996 to 1998 and a state championship during her senior year. She was twice named a Parade All American. Solo also played club soccer for the Three Rivers Soccer Club in the Tri-Cities.

=== Washington Huskies, 1999–2002 ===
After being heavily recruited by several colleges around the country, Solo attended the University of Washington from 1999 to 2002 where she majored in speech communications. With the Huskies, she switched permanently to goalkeeper under the lead of head coach Lesle Gallimore and goalkeeper coach and former national team player, Amy Griffin.

Solo became the top goalkeeper in Pac-10 history and finished her collegiate career as Washington's all-time leader in shutouts (18), saves (325) and goals against average (GAA) (1.02). She was a four-time All-Pac-10 selection and was named an NSCAA All-American as a sophomore, junior and senior. During her sophomore year, Solo was named Pac-10 Player of the Year becoming the first Washingtonian and first goalkeeper ever to receive the award. As a senior, she was the only goalkeeper nominated for the Hermann Trophy.

== Club career ==
=== WUSA and European professional leagues, 2003–05 ===
Following her college career, Solo was selected in the first round (fourth overall) of the 2003 WUSA Draft by the Philadelphia Charge. She spent most of her first professional season on the bench, playing in eight games. Solo started the last three games of the season, and earned her first professional shutout against the Atlanta Beat. She also shut out eventual league champions, the Washington Freedom, led by top scorers Mia Hamm and Abby Wambach. After the WUSA folded following the 2003 season, just six days before the 2003 FIFA Women's World Cup, Solo moved to Gothenburg, Sweden in February 2004 to play for Kopparbergs/Göteborg FC in the Swedish Premier Division, the top division of women's soccer in Sweden. For ten months, she played in two games a week, making 19 appearances in goal for Göteborg in 2004. In 2005, she played for Olympique Lyonnais in the French First Division. She made seven appearances for the French club.

=== The WPS years, 2009–11 ===
==== Saint Louis Athletica ====
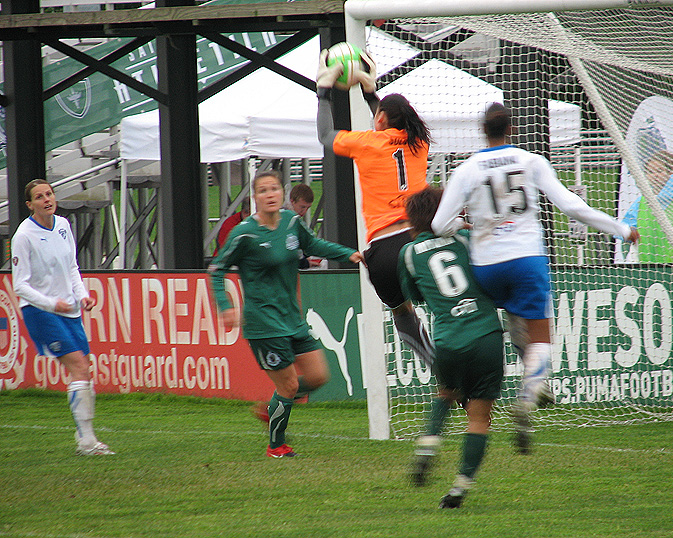
Solo saves a shot from the Boston Breakers in April 2010.

On September 16, 2008, Solo was one of three national team players allocated to the Saint Louis Athletica in the WPS as part of the 2008 WPS Player Allocation, with the new league slated to begin play in April 2009. Solo let in six goals in the first four games as Athletica got off to a very slow 0–2–2 start in their first season. She conceded eight goals in her next 13 games and finished the season with eight shutouts, helping lead the Athletica from the bottom of the standings to finish second place and secure a playoff spot.

After the 2009 season, Solo was named the WPS Goalkeeper of the Year. She also became the first goalkeeper to be named U.S. Soccer Female Athlete of the Year, the highest honor awarded to a soccer player in the United States.

==== Atlanta Beat ====
In May 2010, the Saint Louis Athletica folded and Solo signed with WPS expansion team Atlanta Beat, along with her St. Louis teammates Tina Ellertson and Eniola Aluko. As her previous jersey number was taken (1), she wore 78 for the Beat. Solo's comments on social networking website Twitter led to two separate controversies after she accused Boston Breakers supporters of offensive chanting and racist remarks toward a teammate, then questioned the integrity of match officials and the league itself following the Beat's 1–0 defeat to Washington Freedom. The second outburst resulted in a $2,500 fine and one-game suspension.

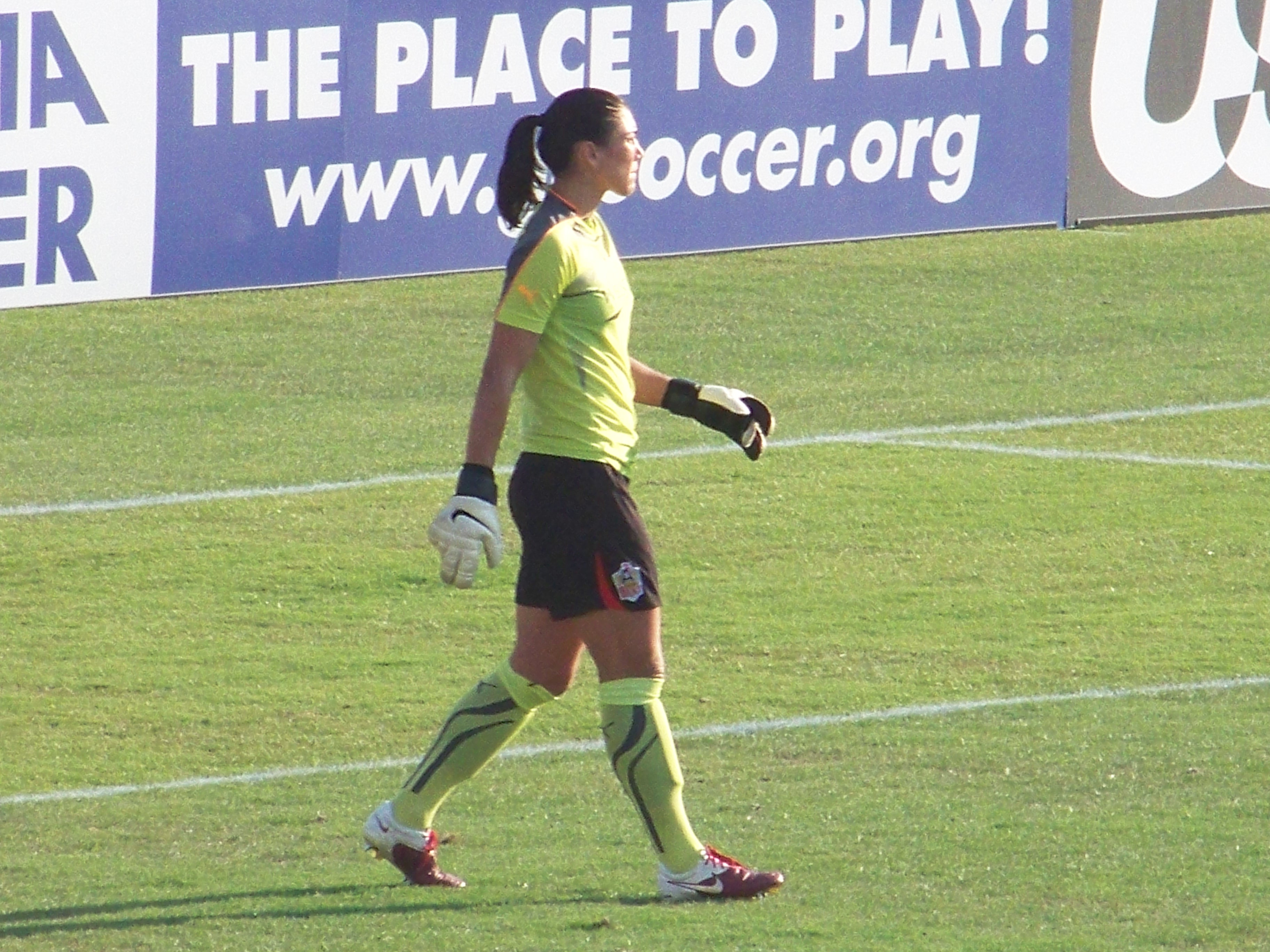
Solo playing for the Beat in 2010

Solo played in 22 WPS matches in 2010 for both the Athletica and the Beat and was the league-leader in saves with 104. The two-time WPS All-Star also ranked among the top three in shutouts (6), wins (6), and goals against average (1.64). After the end of the 2010 season, Solo underwent surgery on her right shoulder on September 22.

==== magicJack ====
Ahead of the 2011 Women's Professional Soccer season, Solo signed for magicJack, formerly the Washington Freedom under new ownership. Between her shoulder surgery recovery, national team commitments and preparation for the 2011 FIFA Women's World Cup, Solo missed a significant part of the season. She made four appearances for the club, tallying a total of 360 minutes. After the season ended, the club lost its franchise on October 25, 2011. The league later suspended operations in early 2012 because of legal and financial difficulties.

=== Seattle Sounders Women, 2012 ===
On February 14, 2012, it was announced that Solo had signed with the Seattle Sounders Women. Joining the club the same year were national teammates Alex Morgan, Megan Rapinoe, and Sydney Leroux. Because of national team commitments and preparation for the 2012 Summer Olympics, Solo made three appearances for the club, tallying a total of 261 minutes. Her goals against average was 0.344, she made five saves and had one shutout. With the addition of Solo and her national team teammates, the Sounders sold out nine of their ten home matches at Starfire Stadium (capacity: 4,500). The average attendance during league matches was four times higher than the second most attended team in the league.

=== NWSL: a new era, 2013–2016 ===
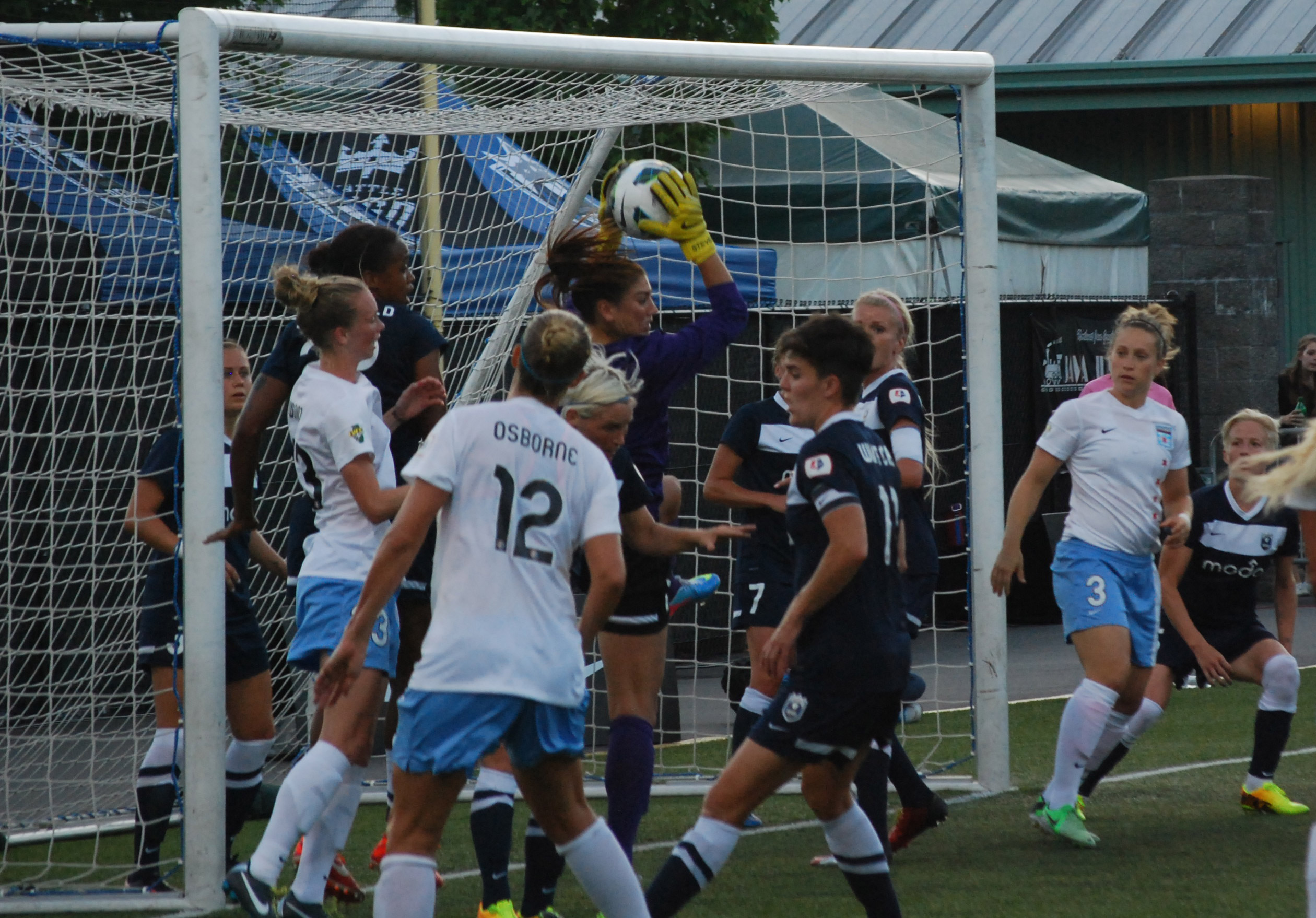
Solo makes a save during a match against the Chicago Red Stars on July 25, 2013, at Starfire Stadium in Tukwila, Washington.

==== Seattle Reign FC ====
On January 19, 2013, it was announced that Solo was one of three members from the United States national team, along with Megan Rapinoe and Amy Rodriguez, allocated to the Seattle Reign FC for the inaugural season of the National Women's Soccer League, as part of the NWSL Player Allocation. Two months later, it was reported that she was undergoing wrist surgery and would miss about half the season because of recovery. Joining news that Amy Rodriguez would be out for the season because of pregnancy and Megan Rapinoe would be returning mid-season after a six-month stint for Olympique Lyonnais, the Reign faced a tough first half of the season and went 0–9–1 in their first ten games. With the return of Solo, Rapinoe, and some additional lineup changes made during the early summer, the Reign turned their regular season record around and finished the season in seventh place with a 5–14–3 record. Solo started in all 14 matches in which she played with a 1.357 goals against average. She made 81 saves and tallied 1,260 minutes in goal.

In October 2013 Solo was linked with a transfer to English club Manchester City. Despite the relatively high salary reportedly offered by Manchester, Reign FC coach Laura Harvey expected Solo to return to the NWSL for 2014, to safeguard her place in the national team.

Solo returned to the Reign for the 2014 season. The team set a league record unbeaten streak of 16 games during the first part of the season. During the 16 game stretch, the Reign compiled a 13–0–3 record. The Reign finished first in the regular season clinching the NWSL Shield for the first time. After defeating the Washington Spirit 2–1 in the playoff semi-finals, the Reign were defeated 2–1 by FC Kansas City during the championship final. Following the regular season, Solo and Reign defenders Lauren Barnes and Stephanie Cox were named to the Second XI team, and Solo was one of three finalists for NWSL Goalkeeper of the Year. Solo finished the 2014 season with 65 saves in 20 games played and a .900 goals against average.

Solo made eight appearances for Seattle during the 2016 season before joining the national team at the 2016 Rio Olympics. After US Soccer suspended Solo and terminated her national team contract in August 2016 for saying that Sweden "played like cowards," she was granted "personal leave" by the Reign for the remainder of the NWSL season. She finished the season with a 0.63 GAA and 81% save percentage, including five clean sheets.

== International career ==
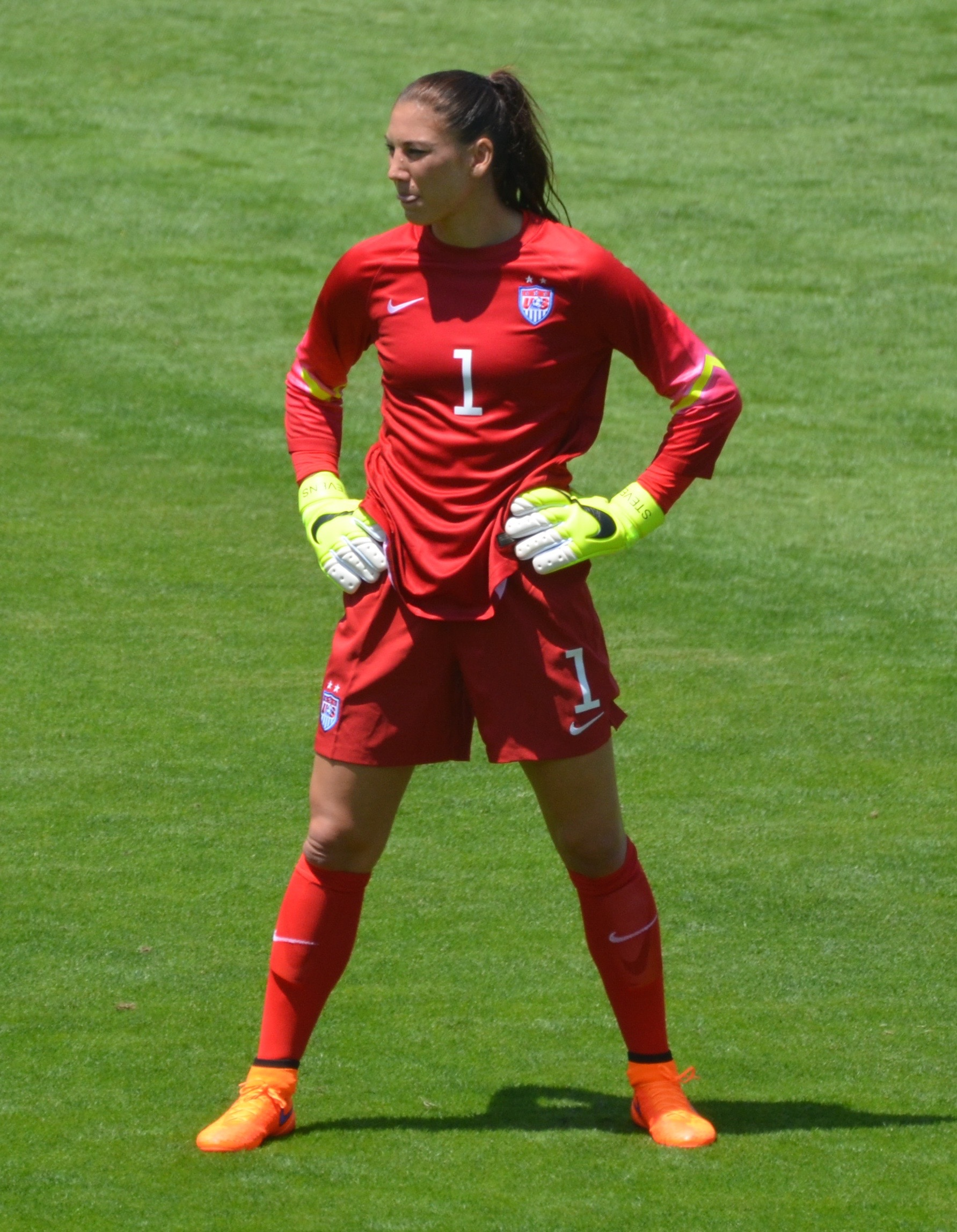
San Jose, Calif., 2015

Solo played for U.S. junior national soccer teams before joining the senior U.S. national team in 2000. Her senior debut came in an 8–0 win over Iceland at Davidson, North Carolina, in April 2000. In 2004, Solo joined the national team at the 2004 Summer Olympics in Athens as an alternate behind primary goalkeeper Briana Scurry and backup Kristin Luckenbill. Solo has been the team's first choice goalkeeper since 2005. She holds the national team record for longest undefeated streak as a goalkeeper with 55 games from March 7, 2002, to July 16, 2008.

=== 2007 FIFA Women's World Cup ===
Solo was the starting goalkeeper for the United States in the 2007 FIFA Women's World Cup, surrendering two goals in four games, including consecutive shutouts of Sweden, Nigeria and England. Before the semifinal match against Brazil, U.S. coach Greg Ryan benched Solo in favor of 36-year-old veteran keeper Briana Scurry, who had a strong history of performance against the Brazilians but had not played a complete game in three months. The U.S. lost to Brazil 4–0, ending a 51-game (regulation-time) undefeated streak. The team played much of the match with only 10 players after midfielder Shannon Boxx was removed from the match after receiving two yellow cards in the first half.

==== Post-2007 World Cup fallout ====
Following the match, Solo criticized Ryan's decision: "It was the wrong decision, and I think anybody that knows anything about the game knows that. There's no doubt in my mind I would have made those saves. And the fact of the matter is it's not 2004 anymore. It's not 2004. And it's 2007, and I think you have to live in the present. And you can't live by big names. You can't live in the past. It doesn't matter what somebody did in an Olympic gold medal game in the Olympics three years ago. Now is what matters, and that's what I think." Many viewed her comments as critical of Scurry's performance, although Solo released an apologetic statement the following day stating that criticism was not her intent. On September 29, 2007, Ryan announced that Solo was no longer with the team and would not play in the third-place match against Norway the following day. Team captain Kristine Lilly stated that the decision regarding Solo was made by the team as a group. The U.S. defeated Norway 4–1.

Solo was named to the national team roster for the post-World Cup tour but did not attend the workout ahead of the first game against Mexico. Although the players' contract with the federation stipulated that anyone on the World Cup roster had the right to play in the tour, she did not play in any of the three games against Mexico and was replaced by Briana Scurry for the first and third matches, and Nicole Barnhart for the second. The third match against Mexico, on October 20, 2007, marked the end of the team's 2007 season. The team regrouped in January 2008 to begin preparations for the 2008 Summer Olympics. Ryan left the team after his contract was not renewed in December 2007.

=== 2008 Summer Olympics ===
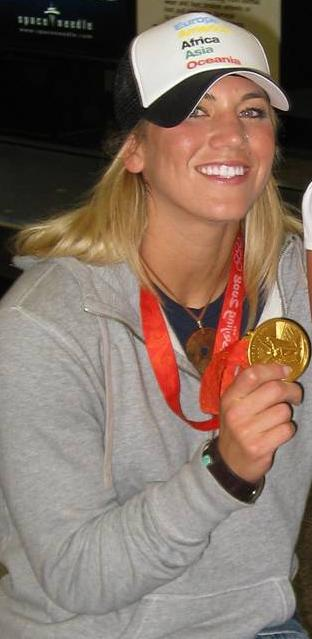
Solo with her 2008 Olympic gold medal

On June 23, 2008, Solo was announced as the starting goalkeeper for the U.S. team at the 2008 Summer Olympics in Beijing. In a reversal of roles from the 2004 Olympics, Briana Scurry did not make the team, although she was named an alternate. On August 21, the U.S. women's team won the gold medal by defeating Brazil 1–0 in extra time. After the team won gold, Solo appeared on the Today show. In a 2012 article, she revealed that she was drunk while on the show: "When we were done partying, we got out of our dresses, got back into our stadium coats and, at 7 a.m. with no sleep, went on the Today show drunk."

=== 2011 FIFA Women's World Cup ===
Despite missing much of the qualifying campaign with a shoulder injury, Solo was named to the U.S. roster for the 2011 FIFA Women's World Cup in Germany. After keeping clean sheets in group C wins over North Korea and Colombia, Solo conceded two goals in the 2–1 loss to Sweden, which consigned the Americans to second place in the group and a quarterfinal meeting with Brazil.

The quarterfinal match between the U.S. and Brazil was sent into a penalty shootout after U.S. forward Abby Wambach tied the game at 2–2 at the end of extra time. Solo saved Brazil's third penalty kick, helping the U.S. secure a semifinal spot against France.

Solo became the twenty-seventh American woman and second goalkeeper to reach 100 caps with her start in the 3–1 semifinal win over France.

In the final, the U.S. team lost 3–1 in a penalty shootout to Japan, after twice taking the lead in an eventual 2–2 draw. Solo expressed admiration for the Japanese team and offered her congratulations. Solo won the Golden Glove award for best goalkeeper, and the Bronze Ball award for her overall performance. She was also featured in the "All-star" team of the tournament.

=== 2012 Summer Olympics ===
Preceding the Summer Olympics, Solo received a public warning from the U.S. Anti-Doping Agency (USADA) after a June 15 urine test detected the banned substance canrenone. Solo claimed that she had been prescribed a premenstrual medication and was unaware that it contained banned substances. The USADA confirmed her claim and she was cleared with a public warning. The positive test did not require Solo to withdraw from any pre-Olympic matches.

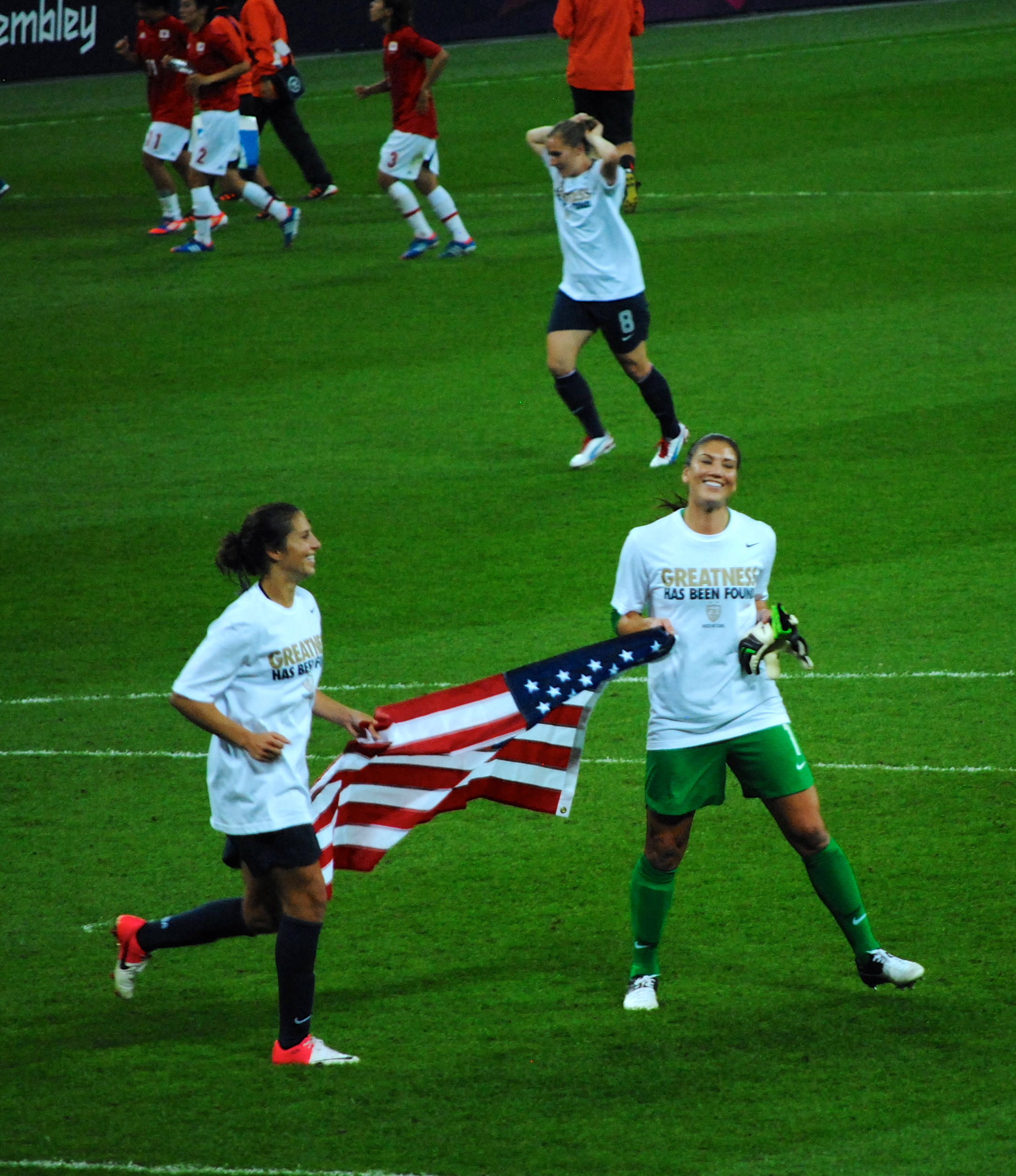
Solo and teammate Carli Lloyd after the 2012 Summer Olympics final

Trailing France in the opening match, Solo sent a free kick to Alex Morgan, who then scored to spark a 4–2 comeback victory.

On August 9, Solo won her second Olympic gold medal with a 2–1 defeat of Japan in the final match. Solo made many saves, including an 82nd-minute save of a shot by Mana Iwabuchi that could have tied the match.

Solo recorded three shutouts: two against Colombia and North Korea in the group stage and one against New Zealand in the quarterfinal. She conceded six goals over the course of the tournament, three of which were scored by Christine Sinclair in the semifinal match, a 4–3 extra-time win against Canada. Along with defenders Christie Rampone and Kelley O'Hara, Solo was one of three players on the team who played all 570 minutes during the team's six matches.

=== 2013–2014 ===
In March 2013, Solo underwent surgery to repair a persistent injury in her left wrist and did not play for approximately three months. She returned to the national team in June. The team finished 2013 undefeated in 16 games, with 13 wins.

On June 14, 2014, Solo tied the U.S. record for career shutouts with 71 after the team defeated France 1–0 during a friendly match in Tampa, Florida. The record had been previously set by Briana Scurry. On September 13, she set a new record with her 72nd shutout in a friendly match against Mexico, an 8–0 win for the U.S. On January 21, 2015, Solo was suspended by the national team for 30 days following an undisclosed incident at a training camp.

=== 2015 FIFA Women's World Cup ===
In April 2015, Solo was named to the U.S. roster for the 2015 FIFA Women's World Cup in Canada by head coach Jill Ellis. Solo started and played all possible minutes (630) in all seven of the team's matches. The U.S. won the tournament, with record-breaking television viewership that topped 750 million television viewers. After surrendering a goal in the 27th minute of the team's first group-stage match against Australia, Solo made three game-saving saves. She had a 540-minute shutout streak, the second longest in tournament history, and allowed only three goals throughout the tournament.

During the semi-final match against top-ranked Germany, she used stalling tactics to try to put the tournament's high scorer, Célia Šašić, off her rhythm at a penalty kick. Šašić missed the penalty kick, which kept the game scoreless. This marked the first time a German team, men's or women's, missed a penalty in a World Cup. She ended the tournament with 177 international caps and received the Golden Glove trophy as the best goalkeeper.

=== 2016: 100th shutout ===
On July 9, 2016, Solo earned her 100th international shutout, 150th career win and 197th cap in a friendly game against South Africa at Soldier Field in Chicago. This made Solo the first female goalkeeper to achieve 100 shutouts in international competition.

=== 2016 Rio Olympics ===
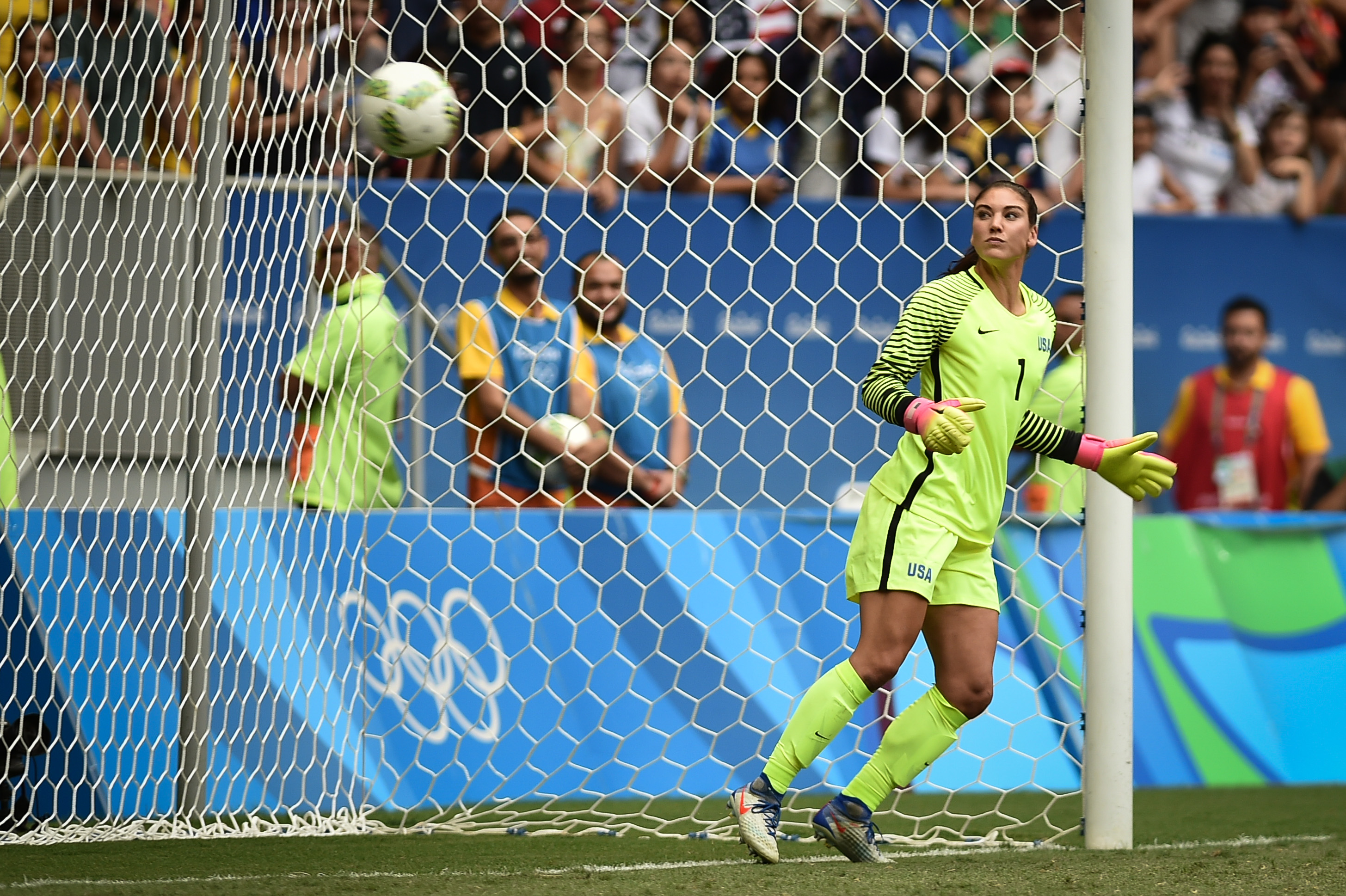
Solo is beaten in the penalty shootout

On the occasion of her 200th cap, Solo made several saves as the United States beat France 1–0 following their opening 2–0 win over New Zealand. In the final group fixture against Colombia, Solo made two errors and the game resulted in a 2–2 draw. During the matches, Solo had been jeered by the Brazilian crowds, who chanted "Zika" when she touched the ball in response to her pre-tournament social-media post with various anti-mosquito products in relation to 2015–16 Zika virus epidemic.

Solo attracted more controversy in the United States' quarterfinal defeat by Sweden. During the penalty shootout, she caused an interruption of several minutes when changing her gloves before Sweden's final kick, in an apparent act of gamesmanship. Lisa Dahlkvist laughed at Solo's antics before converting the penalty to eliminate the United States. Following the match, Solo called her opponents "a bunch of cowards" in reference to their defensive tactics. The International Olympic Committee called Solo's comments "disappointing" but said that she was unlikely to face formal disciplinary action, adding "People are free to say those things. We wouldn't stop their right to express themselves, within boundaries, obviously." Swedish coach Pia Sundhage was more blunt in her assessment, saying: "I don't give a crap. I'm going to Rio, she's going home." She later said, "I think she was just stressed, and that she did not really mean it." Swedish players Lotta Schelin, Lisa Dahlkvist and Kosovare Asllani voiced their empathy for Solo, dismissing her comments as having been said during the heat of the moment.

"I could not be the player I am without being the person I am, even when I haven't made the best choices or said the right things. My entire career, I have only wanted the best for this team, for the players and the women's game and I will continue to pursue these causes with the same unrelenting passion with which I play the game."

— Hope Solo

On August 24, 2016, U.S. Soccer suspended Solo for six months and terminated her national team contract, her second such suspension. The governing body said that Solo's previous misconduct had influenced its decision. Solo reacted angrily, saying that her comments had been used as a pretext to force her out because of her prominent role in the national team's campaign for equal pay. (Note: In 2016 the United States female national team players were still paid less than their male counterparts, despite being much more successful. An ongoing legal conflict sought equal pay for the female players.) Teammate Megan Rapinoe speculated that Solo's termination was "probably some legal strategy" on the part of U.S. Soccer. In announcing a legal challenge to U.S. Soccer's action, the players' lawyer Rich Nichols termed it "excessive, unprecedented, disproportionate, and a violation of Ms. Solo's First Amendment rights."

== Honors ==
=== High school ===
- Parade Magazine All-American: 1997, 1998
- Washington State Championship: 1998

=== College ===
- NSCAA All-American: 2000, 2001, 2002
- Pac-10 Selection: 1999, 2000, 2001, 2002

=== Club ===
- NWSL Shield: 2014, 2015
- WPS Goalkeeper of the Year: 2009

=== International ===
United States

- Olympic Gold Medal: 2008, 2012
- CONCACAF Women's Olympic Qualifying Tournament: 2008, 2012, 2016
- FIFA Women's World Cup Champion: 2015
  Runner-up: 2011
- Algarve Cup: 2005, 2007, 2008, 2010, 2011, 2013, 2015
- SheBelieves Cup: 2016
- Four Nations Tournament: 2006, 2007, 2008
- CONCACAF Women's Championship: 2006, 2014

=== Individual ===
- U.S. Soccer Female Athlete of the Year: 2009
- FIFA Women's World Cup Golden Glove: 2011, 2015
- FIFA Women's World Cup Bronze ball: 2011
- FIFA Women's World Cup All-Star Team: 2011, 2015
- CONCACAF Women's Championship Golden Glove: 2014
- CONCACAF Women's Goalkeeper of the Year: 2015
- SheBelieves Cup Golden Glove: 2016
- FIFPro: FIFA FIFPro World XI 2015 2016
- IFFHS World's Best Woman Goalkeeper: 2012, 2013, 2014, 2015
- NWSL Second XI: 2014
- IFFHS World's Woman Team of the Decade 2011–2020
- IFFHS CONCACAF Woman Team of the Decade 2011–2020
- National Soccer Hall of Fame: 2022

=== Other ===
- Do Something Award – Athlete: 2012
- Phoenix Mercury Woman of Inspiration: 2012
- Hall of Game She's Got Game Award: 2012
- Sports Spectacular Female Athlete of the Year: 2013

== Personal life ==
Solo is married to former American football player Jerramy Stevens. They have been together since mid-August 2012 when she returned from the Olympics. On November 12, 2012, Stevens was arrested on investigation of assault following an altercation that left Solo injured. The next day, Stevens was released after a judge determined that insufficient evidence existed to hold him. The couple were wed the following day. In December 2019, Solo announced that she and Stevens were expecting twins. They were born on March 4, 2020.

In 2014, Solo was one of the victims of the iCloud leaks of celebrity photos, during which several nude pictures of her were leaked online. She expressed solidarity with the other women affected and criticized the perpetrators, stating "This act goes beyond the bounds of human decency".

=== Arrests ===
On June 21, 2014, Solo was arrested and charged with two misdemeanor counts of assault in the fourth degree, one against her half-sister and the other against her nephew. She was booked under her married name of Hope Amelia Stevens. After pleading not guilty, she was released the following day. Her trial was scheduled for November 4, 2014, but it was delayed until January 20, 2015. On December 30, 2014, the judge ordered more depositions from the defendants and delayed a decision on whether charges against Solo would be dropped until January 6, 2015.

Following her arrest, Solo missed one game for the Reign and the NWSL allowed her to continue playing through the end of the 2014 season. There was some debate in the media about a perceived double standard after pro football players Ray Rice and Adrian Peterson had been suspended by the National Football League. A video showed Rice assaulting his wife in a hotel elevator and a grand jury indicted Peterson for child abuse. Senator Richard Blumenthal sent a sternly worded letter to U.S. Soccer president Sunil Gulati admonishing the organization for allowing Solo to remain on the World Cup roster and accusing them of inadequately addressing the charges of domestic violence.

On January 13, 2015, the judge dismissed the charges against Solo based on a lack of cooperation from both alleged victims. Solo claimed that she had defended herself from an attack by her nephew. However, prosecutors filed an appeal with the Superior Court of Washington. In October 2015, the prosecution prevailed in the Superior Court and the charges were reinstated. In June 2016, the state appeals court denied Solo's petition to review the case. On May 24, 2018, the city of Kirkland dismissed all domestic violence charges against her. Attorney Melissa Osman, who represents the city, wrote in court documents that the circumstances of the case were "unlikely to recur”, and prosecution witnesses did not wish to testify.

On January 19, 2015, Solo's husband Jerramy Stevens was arrested in Manhattan Beach, California for suspicion of DUI while he had been driving the U.S. Soccer team van. Stevens refused a blood or breathalyzer test, so officers obtained a search warrant to draw a blood sample, which determined that his blood-alcohol concentration was at least 0.15%. Solo was suspended for 30 days by the team for showing poor judgment in entering the car and arguing with the police. In May, Stevens was sentenced to 30 days in jail and four years of probation. The judge also mandated a two-year outpatient alcohol program.

On March 31, 2022, Solo was arrested for driving while intoxicated, resisting arrest and misdemeanor child abuse. Her two-year-old twins were in her car when she was arrested in a Walmart parking lot in Winston-Salem, North Carolina. Solo pleaded guilty to driving while intoxicated, and charges for resisting arrest and child abuse were dismissed.

=== Endorsements ===
Solo has signed endorsement deals with Seiko, Simple Skincare, Nike, BlackBerry, Ubisoft, Electronic Arts and Gatorade. In July 2011, she signed a one-year endorsement deal with Bank of America. In September 2011, she starred in an EA Sports television commercial with professional basketball player Steve Nash, promoting FIFA 12. That same month, she co-starred with national teammate Alex Morgan in a television commercial promoting ESPN's SportsCenter. In 2014, she was featured in a promotional piece for Western Union. Solo signed with LX Ventures, Inc. and Mobio as a "social media influencer" in March 2014. In June 2016, she partnered with Organically Raw to promote its Shanti Bar line of energy and protein bars.

=== Philanthropy ===
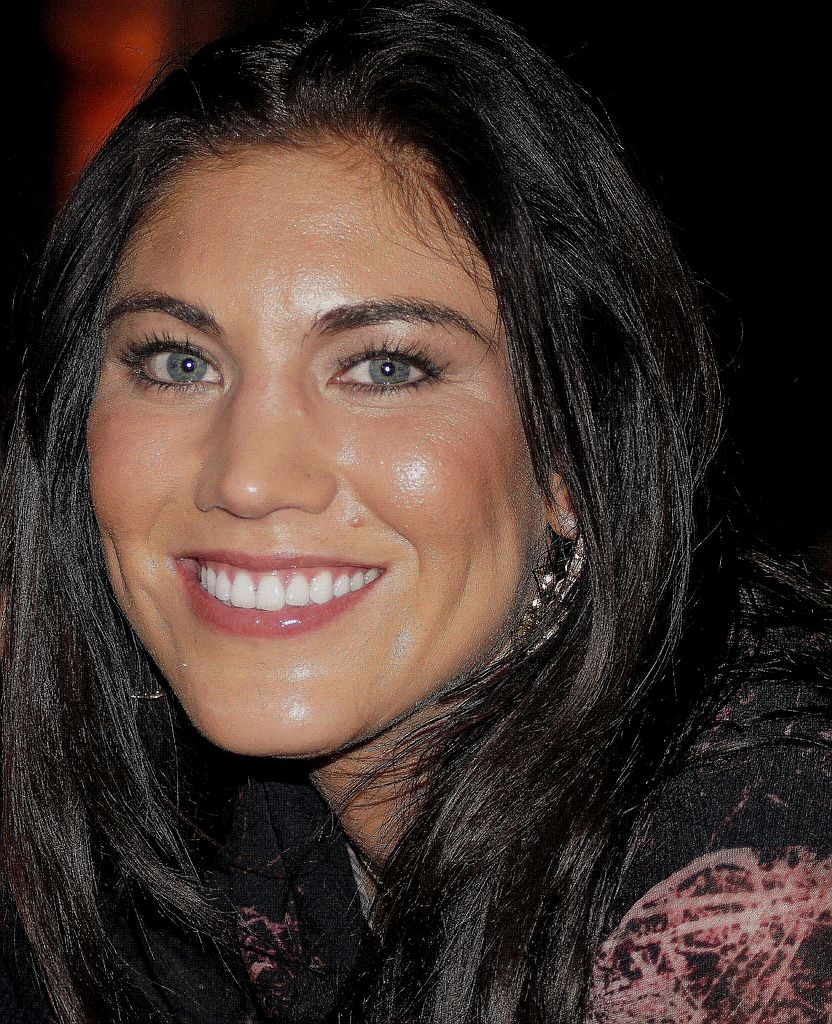
Solo at the National Italian American Foundation, 2013

Solo is a representative of the Women's Sports Foundation, an organization founded by Billie Jean King that is dedicated to "advancing the lives of girls and women through sports and physical activity." She has donated her time and money to the Boys and Girls Club and has appeared at numerous charity events. In August 2011, she joined teammates Alex Morgan and Abby Wambach in a Bank of America charitable campaign at the Chicago Marathon, with $5,000 donated to the Seattle Humane Society on her behalf. In 2012, Solo was one of 15 professional athletes including Shaun Phillips, Tim Lincecum, Ray Rice who participated in Popchips' Game Changers program. She appeared at several charity events and money was donated to a local charity that she had selected.

== In popular culture ==
=== Television and film ===
In 2011, Solo was a contestant on the 13th season of the Dancing with the Stars television series. Her partner was Maksim Chmerkovskiy and they were eliminated in the semifinal round, placing fourth overall in the competition.

She has made appearances on The Late Show with David Letterman, Piers Morgan Tonight, Late Night with Jimmy Fallon, The Ellen DeGeneres Show, Chelsea Lately, and Whitney. Solo was the focus of an ESPN E:60 episode in 2012. During her interview by Jeremy Schaap, she told of her experience at the 2007 World Cup as well as her childhood. In 2013, she was featured in the PBS documentary, Makers: Women Who Make America and ESPN documentary series, Nine for IX. The Nine for IX documentary Branded, in which Solo appeared, focused on the marketing of female professional athletes and the double standard that they often face with more value placed on beauty rather than on their athletic excellence. Branded received the highest viewership of all of the documentaries in the series.

In 2016, Solo starred with teammates Megan Rapinoe and Crystal Dunn in a docu-series called Keeping Score broadcast by Fullscreen. The episodes followed the athletes as they prepared for the 2016 Rio Olympics and addressed issues such as equal pay and racism. The season's final episode showed her reaction after learning that she had been suspended from the national team.

In February 2017, Solo signed to serve as host for the sports medical television series The Cutting Edge. The same month, she was featured on 60 Minutes Sports.

In June 2017 Solo appeared alongside Eric Cantona in a whimsical Eurosport promo segment in which she was presented as the network's "Commissioner of Women's Football." Solo worked for the BBC as a pundit at the 2019 FIFA Women's World Cup.

=== Magazines ===
Solo has been featured on the covers of Fitness, Sports Illustrated, Newsweek, TV Guide, Seattle Metropolitan Magazine, and Vogue. In 2011, she appeared nude in The Body Issue of ESPN The Magazine. Of the experience, she said, "I'm an athlete—that's all I am. If a sex symbol is now a top female athlete, I think that's pretty amazing and it shows how far our country has come from the stick-thin models, from what you see in most magazines."

=== Autobiography ===
On August 14, 2012, after the London Olympics, Solo released her autobiography Solo: A Memoir of Hope co-authored with sports columnist and commentator Ann Killion and published by HarperCollins. In her book, she provided her accounts of incidents with former U.S. national coach Greg Ryan, and her Dancing with the Stars partner Maksim Chmerkovskiy. She recounted her integration into the U.S. team with established players such as Mia Hamm, Brandi Chastain and Julie Foudy. Solo also revealed details of her early life. The autobiography debuted at number three on The New York Times Best Seller list in the hardcover non-fiction category—the highest ever for a soccer-related book.

=== Video games ===
Solo is featured along with her national teammates in the EA Sports FIFA video game series, starting with FIFA 16, the first time in which women players were included in the game. In September 2015, she was ranked by EA Sports as the #8 women's player in the game.

=== Tickertape parade and White House honor ===
Following the United States' win at the 2015 FIFA Women's World Cup, Solo and her teammates became the first women's sports team to be honored with a tickertape parade in New York City. Each player received a key to the city from Mayor Bill de Blasio. In October of the same year, the team was honored by President Barack Obama at the White House.

== See also ==
- List of FIFA Women's World Cup winning players
- FIFA Women's World Cup awards
- List of Olympic medalists in football
- List of women's footballers with 100 or more caps
- List of University of Washington alumni
- List of sportswomen
