= Keeping Score (TV series) =

- Genre: Docuseries
- Directed by: Bess Kargman
- Starring: Hope Solo; Megan Rapinoe; Crystal Dunn

Keeping Score is a documentary series featuring American soccer players Hope Solo, Megan Rapinoe, and Crystal Dunn that was broadcast by Fullscreen in 2016. The series followed the players' experiences in the lead up to their participation at the 2016 Rio Olympics and addressed equality for women in the sports industry and the wage gap for American women workers in general as well as race.
