= FIFA Women's World Cup qualification =

Football tournament

The FIFA Women's World Cup qualification is the process a national women's association football team goes through to qualify for the FIFA Women's World Cup.

Qualifying tournaments are held within the six FIFA continental zones (Africa, Asia, North and Central America and Caribbean, South America, Oceania, Europe), and are organized by their respective confederations. For each tournament, FIFA decides beforehand the number of berths awarded to each of the continental zones, based on the relative strength of the confederations' teams. The hosts of the World Cup receive an automatic berth in the finals. For the 2015 and 2019 FIFA Women's World Cups, the number of finalists increased from 16 to 24. Since 2023, the number is 32.

All confederations, except for CONMEBOL, OFC, and UEFA, hold qualification process throughout continental tournaments. The UEFA organises its own qualification phase since 1999, as do CONMEBOL and OFC for 2027. Starting from 2031, the AFC will also organise its own qualification.

== Qualification berths by continent ==
Teams in qualifying
Year	Teams
1991	49
1995	55
1999	69
2003	98
2007	129
2011	126
2015	134
2019	143
2023	172
2027	186

The table below lists the numbers of berths allocated by FIFA for each continent in each tournament.

Intercontinental play-offs are played as two home-and-away matches. The team that scores a greater aggregate number of goals qualifies for the World Cup. Away goals rule applies. If these rules fail to determine the winner, extra time and penalty shootouts are used.

"H" denotes an automatic spot for the host. Places in intercontinental play-offs are represented as fractions, with a place in a direct play-off being counted as 0.5 spots.

Places allocated for continents
Continental zone	1991 (China) ^{1}	1995 (Sweden)	1999 (United States)	2003 (United States) ^{2}	2007 (China)	2011 (Germany)	2015 (Canada)	2019 (France)	2023 (Australia) (New Zealand)	2027 (Brazil)
Africa	1	1	2	2	2	2	3	3	4	4
Asia	3	2	3	2.5+H	2.5+H	3	5	5	5+H	6
Oceania	1	1	1	1	1	1	1	1	0+H	1
Europe	5	4+H	6	5	5	4.5+H	8	8+H	11	11
North and Central America and Caribbean	1	2	1.5+H	2.5	2.5	2.5	3.5+H	3.5	4	4
South America	1	1	1.5	2	2	2	2.5	2.5	3	2+H
Play-off tournament	Did not exist								3	3
Total	12	12	16	16	16	16	24	24	32	32

- ^{1} In 1991, China hosted the tournament, but the location was determined after Asian qualifying had been completed.
- ^{2} Originally to be held in China, the tournament was moved to the United States. China retained its automatic qualifying status as original host.

== Qualification competition entrants over time ==
Entrants in continental qualifying tournaments
Continental zone	1991 (China) (12)	1995 (Sweden) (12)	1999 (United States) (16)	2003 (United States) (16)	2007 (China) (16)	2011 (Germany) (16)	2015 (Canada) (24)	2019 (France) (24)	2023 (Australia) (New Zealand) (32)	2027 (Brazil) (32)
Africa	8	8	15	22	35	24	26	24	43	39
Asia	9	4	11	18	17	17	20	24	27	38
Oceania	3	3	6	10	10	8	4	11	9	11
Europe	18	30	16^{1}	16^{1}	25^{1}	41	46	46	51	53
North and Central America and Caribbean	8	5	11^{2}	22^{3}	32	26	28	28	32	31
South America	3	5	10	10	10	10	10	10	10	10
Total	49	55	69	98	129	126	134	143	172	182
Teams played	45	52	66	84	109	119	130	136	155	184
Matches played	111	135	152	195	263	355	406	392	505	
Goals scored	445	655	803	867	1,032	1,436	1,686	1,562	2,143	

- ^{1} Only teams in European Class A could qualify for the Women's World Cup finals. Other sides could at best be promoted to Class A for subsequent tournament.
- ^{2} A second Guatemalan side also competed, but their matches are not included in the list.
- ^{3} The United States (eventual hosts of the finals) competed in the qualifying tournament.

== First appearance in qualification by team ==
Listed are the first appearance in the qualifying stages by a national team. Teams that entered for the first time but withdrew are written in italics.

WC	Europe	South America	North, Central America and Caribbean	Asia	Africa	Oceania	Total
(China); 1991	Belgium; Bulgaria; Czechoslovakia; Denmark; England; Finland; France; Germany; Hungary; Italy; Netherlands; Northern Ireland; Norway; Poland; Republic of Ireland; Spain; Sweden; Switzerland	Brazil; Chile; Venezuela	Canada; Costa Rica; Haiti; Jamaica; Mexico; Trinidad and Tobago; United States	China; Chinese Taipei; Hong Kong; Japan; North Korea; South Korea; Malaysia; Singapore; Thailand	Cameroon; Congo; Ghana; Guinea; Nigeria; Senegal; Zambia; Zimbabwe	Australia; New Zealand; Papua New Guinea	44
(Sweden); 1995	Croatia; Czech Republic; Greece; Iceland; Latvia; Lithuania; Portugal; Romania; Russia; Scotland; Slovakia; Slovenia; Ukraine; Wales; FR Yugoslavia	Argentina; Bolivia; Ecuador	None	None	Angola; Sierra Leone; South Africa; Zambia	None	21
(United States); 1999	Estonia	Colombia; Paraguay; Peru; Uruguay	El Salvador; Guatemala; Guyana; Honduras; Puerto Rico	Guam; India; Kazakhstan; Philippines; Uzbekistan	DR Congo; Egypt; Kenya; Lesotho; Morocco; Mozambique; Namibia; Swaziland; Uganda	American Samoa; Fiji; Samoa	24
(United States); 2003	Moldova	None	Bahamas; Belize; Dominica; Dominican Republic; Montserrat; Nicaragua; Panama; Saint Lucia; Suriname; U.S. Virgin Islands	Indonesia; Myanmar; Nepal; Vietnam	Botswana; Equatorial Guinea; Eritrea; Ethiopia; Gabon; Guinea-Bissau; Ivory Coast; Mali; São Tomé and Príncipe; Senegal; Tanzania; Zimbabwe	Cook Islands; Tahiti; Tonga; Vanuatu	21
(China); 2007	Austria; Belarus; Serbia and Montenegro	None	Antigua and Barbuda; Aruba; Barbados; Bermuda; British Virgin Islands; Cayman Islands; Grenada; Netherlands Antilles; Nicaragua; Saint Kitts and Nevis; Saint Vincent and the Grenadines; Turks and Caicos Islands	Indonesia; Maldives	Algeria; Benin; Central African Republic; Congo; Djibouti; Kenya; Libya; Malawi; Namibia; Togo	New Caledonia; Solomon Islands; Tonga	28
(Germany); 2011	Armenia; Azerbaijan; Bosnia and Herzegovina; Georgia; Israel; Macedonia; Malta; Serbia; Turkey	None	Anguilla; Belize; Cuba	Bangladesh; Iran; Jordan; Kyrgyzstan; Palestine	Botswana; Tunisia	Tahiti; Vanuatu	21
(Canada); 2015	Albania; Faroe Islands; Luxembourg; Montenegro	None	None	Bahrain; Bangladesh; Kuwait; Lebanon	Burkina Faso; Comoros; Rwanda; South Sudan	None	11
(France); 2019	Andorra; Kosovo	None	None	Iraq; Syria; Tajikistan; United Arab Emirates	Gambia; Libya	New Caledonia	9
(Australia) (New Zealand); 2023	Cyprus	None	None	Afghanistan; Laos; Mongolia; Nepal; Turkmenistan	Burundi; Guinea-Bissau; Liberia; Mauritania; Niger; South Sudan; Sudan	None	10
(Brazil); 2027	Gibraltar; Liechtenstein	None	None	Bhutan; Cambodia; Pakistan; Saudi Arabia; Sri Lanka; Timor-Leste; Turkmenistan	Cape Verde; Chad	None	10

== National teams results in World Cup preliminary competition (1991–2023) ==
Legend
Team has won the World Cup
Team has qualified for the main tournament through a qualifying process
Team has not qualified for the main tournament
Team is not a member of FIFA and is not eligible for the main tournament (Martinique and Guadeloupe)

The table is updated after 2019 FIFA Women's World Cup qualification in all continents except for Asia (AFC), which was already updated after the 2023 FIFA Women's World Cup qualification.

No. (Note: Teams are ranked by total points, by goal difference, by goals scored, then by alphebetical order of team. Note that this column does not represent any official rankings.)	Team	App's (Note: Only qualifying campaigns are counted where the team played at least one match that was not annulled.)	Overall qualification record							Points (Note: The three points for a win system is used.)		Confederation
No.	Team	App's	Pld	W	D	L	GF	GA	GD	Total point	Avg	Confederation
1	Norway	8	68	56	7	5	223	39	184	175	2.574	UEFA
2	Germany	7	61	56	2	3	275	24	251	170	2.787	UEFA
3	Sweden	8	63	53	5	5	226	37	189	164	2.603	UEFA
4	England	8	72	46	12	14	206	46	160	150	2.083	UEFA
5	Denmark	8	70	45	13	12	219	52	167	148	2.114	UEFA
6	Italy	8	76	45	13	18	196	63	133	148	1.947	UEFA
7	France	7	56	41	7	8	162	36	126	130	2.321	UEFA
8	Nigeria	8	46	42	2	2	177	19	158	128	2.783	CAF
9	Brazil	8	44	41	1	2	248	19	229	124	2.818	CONMEBOL
10	Netherlands	8	64	38	10	16	160	57	103	124	1.937	UEFA
11	Russia	7	56	36	7	13	127	72	55	115	2.054	UEFA
12	Spain	8	60	34	11	15	175	57	118	113	1.883	UEFA
13	Japan	9	50	33	8	9	181	32	149	107	2.140	AFC
14	China	9	44	33	5	6	173	25	148	104	2.363	AFC
15	Scotland	7	56	32	5	19	147	81	66	101	1.804	UEFA
16	Iceland	7	56	30	10	16	131	57	74	100	1.786	UEFA
17	Trinidad and Tobago	8	55	31	6	18	181	97	84	99	1.800	CONCACAF
18	Switzerland	8	70	30	9	31	137	118	19	99	1.414	UEFA
19	United States	7	33	32	0	1	184	5	179	96	2.909	CONCACAF
20	Ukraine	7	60	28	10	22	118	92	26	94	1.567	UEFA
21	Poland	8	60	29	6	25	112	90	22	93	1.550	UEFA
22	Finland	8	60	28	9	23	100	79	21	93	1.550	UEFA
23	Australia	9	41	28	7	6	194	20	174	91	2.219	AFC
24	Argentina	7	48	27	6	15	115	65	50	87	1.813	CONMEBOL
25	Hungary	8	64	25	10	29	122	139	−17	85	1.328	UEFA
26	New Zealand	8	32	28	0	4	252	9	243	84	2.265	OFC
27	Czech Republic (1993–); Czechoslovakia (1991–1992)	8	58	24	11	23	136	98	38	83	1.431	UEFA
28	South Africa	6	44	25	6	13	125	61	64	81	1.841	CAF
29	Haiti	6	44	26	2	16	99	76	23	80	1.818	CONCACAF
30	Costa Rica	7	43	26	1	16	109	68	41	79	1.837	CONCACAF
31	Canada	7	31	26	0	5	155	19	136	78	2.516	CONCACAF
32	Republic of Ireland	7	50	23	7	20	70	54	16	76	1.520	UEFA
33	Belgium	8	62	23	7	32	126	115	11	76	1.226	UEFA
34	Jamaica	6	43	23	3	17	153	76	77	72	1.674	CONCACAF
35	South Korea	9	42	21	9	12	128	55	73	72	1.714	AFC
36	Serbia (2006–); Serbia and Montenegro (2003–2006); Yugoslavia (1992–2003)	6	50	22	6	22	85	101	−16	72	1.440	UEFA
37	Romania	7	56	19	13	24	119	79	40	70	1.250	UEFA
38	Mexico	8	41	22	3	16	111	83	28	69	1.683	CONCACAF
39	Cameroon	7	41	20	9	12	69	55	14	69	1.683	CAF
40	North Korea	6	32	21	5	6	140	19	121	68	2.215	AFC
41	Ghana	7	35	22	2	11	72	34	38	68	1.943	CAF
42	Thailand	8	41	22	2	17	93	108	−15	68	1.658	AFC
43	Slovakia (1993–); Czechoslovakia (1991–1992)	8	58	21	25	30	106	95	+11	66	1.517	UEFA
44	Wales	7	50	18	8	24	79	100	−21	62	1.240	UEFA
45	Vietnam	7	42	24	1	17	139	75	64	73	1.738	AFC
46	Chinese Taipei	9	38	18	6	14	73	60	13	60	1.578	AFC
47	Colombia	6	34	17	7	10	75	61	14	58	1.706	CONMEBOL
48	Austria	5	40	17	4	19	78	67	11	55	1.375	UEFA
49	Israel	6	51	17	4	30	51	125	−74	55	1.078	UEFA
50	Portugal	7	52	17	3	32	83	122	−39	54	1.038	UEFA
51	Belarus	6	48	15	4	29	75	114	−39	49	1.021	UEFA
52	Papua New Guinea	8	32	16	0	16	71	135	−64	48	1.500	OFC
53	Myanmar	6	32	14	3	15	75	63	12	45	1.406	AFC
54	Croatia	6	48	12	9	27	51	107	−56	45	0.938	UEFA
55	Chile	8	34	12	6	16	59	68	−9	42	1.235	CONMEBOL
56	Ecuador	6	33	12	6	15	49	80	−31	42	1.273	CONMEBOL
57	Jordan	4	22	13	2	7	101	38	63	41	1.864	AFC
58	Guatemala	5	26	13	0	13	53	55	−2	39	1.500	CONCACAF
59	Uzbekistan	7	24	12	1	11	76	58	18	37	1.525	AFC
60	Paraguay	6	25	12	1	12	51	52	−1	37	1.480	CONMEBOL
61	Slovenia	5	38	12	0	26	46	147	−101	36	0.947	UEFA
62	Panama	4	23	11	2	10	54	57	−3	35	1.522	CONCACAF
63	Philippines	7	28	11	2	15	49	94	−45	35	1.250	AFC
64	Mali	4	28	9	7	12	36	51	−15	34	1.214	CAF
65	Algeria	4	21	10	3	8	29	34	−5	33	1.571	CAF
66	Turkey	5	35	10	3	22	51	99	−48	33	0.943	UEFA
67	Dominican Republic	5	16	9	2	5	36	28	8	29	1.813	CONCACAF
68	Ivory Coast	5	21	6	11	4	32	27	5	29	1.381	CAF
69	Cuba	3	18	9	1	8	48	52	−4	28	1.556	CONCACAF
70	Northern Ireland	5	38	7	5	26	23	94	−71	26	0.684	UEFA
71	Saint Kitts and Nevis	4	15	8	1	6	39	40	−1	25	1.667	CONCACAF
72	Antigua and Barbuda	4	23	8	1	14	19	70	−51	25	1.087	CONCACAF
73	Greece	7	45	8	1	36	43	151	−108	25	0.556	UEFA
74	Bosnia and Herzegovina	6	48	7	4	37	30	181	−151	25	0.521	UEFA
75	DR Congo	4	18	7	3	8	29	33	−4	24	1.333	CAF
76	Puerto Rico	5	19	7	3	9	49	67	−18	24	1.263	CONCACAF
77	Estonia	6	43	7	3	33	32	169	−137	24	0.558	UEFA
78	Zimbabwe	3	13	7	2	4	21	9	12	23	1.769	CAF
79	Bermuda	3	18	7	2	9	33	51	−18	23	1.278	CONCACAF
80	Peru	6	27	6	5	16	24	60	−36	23	0.851	CONMEBOL
81	Hong Kong	8	25	7	2	16	20	82	−62	23	0.920	AFC
82	Equatorial Guinea	5	20	6	4	10	34	51	−17	22	1.100	CAF
83	Saint Lucia	5	16	7	1	8	31	56	−25	22	1.375	CONCACAF
84	Albania	2	24	6	3	15	19	81	−62	21	0.875	UEFA
85	Senegal	5	15	6	2	7	23	19	4	20	1.333	CAF
86	Guyana	3	15	6	2	7	29	43	−14	20	1.333	CONCACAF
87	Zambia	5	20	5	5	10	26	47	−21	20	1.000	CAF
88	Fiji	3	15	6	2	7	34	63	−29	20	1.333	OFC
89	Bulgaria	5	34	5	5	24	19	128	−99	20	0.588	UEFA
90	Uruguay	6	25	5	3	17	23	74	−51	18	0.720	CONMEBOL
91	Faroe Islands	2	24	5	3	16	19	101	−82	18	0.750	UEFA
92	Kazakhstan	5	37	5	3	29	21	114	−93	18	0.487	UEFA
93	Tanzania	4	17	4	5	8	29	42	−13	17	1.000	CAF
94	Venezuela	7	24	5	2	17	25	79	−54	17	0.708	CONMEBOL
95	Angola	4	13	4	4	5	19	19	0	16	1.231	CAF
96	India	5	16	5	1	10	38	50	−12	16	1.000	AFC
97	U.S. Virgin Islands	5	16	5	1	10	18	47	−29	16	1.000	CONCACAF
98	Martinique	4	18	5	1	12	23	78	−55	16	0.889	CONCACAF
99	Suriname	4	16	5	0	11	25	38	−13	15	0.938	CONCACAF
100	Barbados	4	12	4	2	6	16	20	−4	14	1.167	CONCACAF
101	Moldova	4	25	4	2	19	16	90	−74	14	0.560	UEFA
102	Kenya	3	9	4	1	4	12	14	−2	13	1.444	CAF
103	Iran	4	13	4	1	13	24	43	−19	13	1.000	AFC
104	Ethiopia	4	13	3	3	7	26	25	1	12	0.923	CAF
105	Bahrain	3	10	3	3	4	17	22	−5	12	1.200	AFC
106	Curaçao (2014–); Netherlands Antilles (2006 (Note: Games played in 2005 were not recognized by FIFA.)-2010)	2	7	4	0	3	8	14	−6	12	1.714	CONCACAF
107	Malta	4	30	3	3	24	17	123	−106	12	0.400	UEFA
108	El Salvador	6	16	3	2	11	23	56	−33	11	0.688	CONCACAF
109	Bolivia	7	26	3	2	21	26	134	−118	11	0.423	CONMEBOL
110	Congo	2	6	2	1	3	15	11	4	10	1.667	CAF
111	Saint Vincent and the Grenadines	4	11	3	1	7	11	11	0	10	0.909	CONCACAF
112	United Arab Emirates	2	8	3	1	4	7	15	−8	10	1.250	AFC
113	Morocco	6	13	1	7	5	6	19	−13	10	0.769	CAF
114	Cook Islands	4	15	3	1	11	8	63	−55	10	0.667	OFC
115	Mozambique	2	5	3	0	2	19	14	5	9	1.800	CAF
116	Lebanon	2	6	3	0	3	14	12	2	9	1.500	AFC
117	Solomon Islands	3	11	2	3	6	8	27	−19	9	0.818	OFC
118	Namibia	4	9	2	2	5	7	25	−18	8	0.889	CAF
119	Georgia	3	14	2	2	10	11	52	−41	8	0.571	UEFA
120	Montenegro	2	16	2	2	12	20	63	−43	8	0.500	UEFA
121	Tonga	4	12	2	2	8	5	58	−53	8	0.667	OFC
122	Lithuania	4	16	2	2	12	10	82	−72	8	0.500	UEFA
123	Gabon	2	6	2	1	3	10	9	1	7	1.167	CAF
124	Honduras	4	11	2	1	8	22	33	−11	7	0.636	CONCACAF
125	Nicaragua	4	9	2	1	6	7	28	−21	7	0.778	CONCACAF
126	Guinea	3	8	2	1	5	6	29	−23	7	0.875	CAF
127	Malaysia	2	6	2	1	3	3	28	−25	7	1.167	AFC
128	Indonesia	2	7	2	1	4	2	32	−30	7	1.000	AFC
129	Togo	1	4	2	0	2	10	12	−2	6	1.500	CAF
130	Benin	1	6	1	3	2	4	6	−2	6	1.000	CAF
131	Lesotho	2	6	2	0	4	5	15	−10	6	1.000	CAF
132	New Caledonia	1	5	2	0	3	9	23	−14	6	1.200	OFC
133	Latvia	3	10	1	3	6	8	25	−17	6	0.600	UEFA
134	Vanuatu	2	6	2	0	4	4	26	−22	6	1.000	OFC
135	Tajikistan	2	7	2	0	5	7	30	−23	6	0.857	AFC
136	Kyrgyzstan	2	9	2	0	7	10	40	−30	6	0.667	AFC
137	Tunisia	2	6	1	2	3	9	9	0	5	0.833	CAF
138	Egypt	3	9	1	2	6	6	24	−18	5	0.556	CAF
139	Dominica	4	11	1	2	8	7	46	−39	5	0.455	CONCACAF
140	Cayman Islands	2	5	1	1	3	6	10	−4	4	0.800	CONCACAF
141	Tahiti	2	6	1	1	4	13	21	−8	4	0.667	OFC
142	Palestine	4	11	1	1	9	6	50	−44	4	0.444	AFC
143	Azerbaijan	1	8	1	1	6	2	60	−58	4	0.500	UEFA
144	Samoa	3	9	1	1	7	8	77	−69	4	0.444	OFC
145	Singapore	5	17	1	1	15	2	75	−73	4	0.235	AFC
146	Uganda	2	6	0	3	3	3	7	−4	3	0.500	CAF
147	Burkina Faso	2	4	1	0	3	3	9	−6	3	0.750	CAF
148	Gambia	1	4	1	0	3	3	10	−7	3	0.750	CAF
149	Rwanda	1	4	1	0	3	3	14	−11	3	0.750	CAF
150	Anguilla	2	6	1	0	5	3	22	−19	3	0.500	CONCACAF
151	Aruba	3	9	1	0	8	3	29	−26	3	0.333	CONCACAF
152	Malawi	1	2	0	1	1	0	1	−1	1	0.500	CAF
153	Nepal	1	2	0	1	1	1	2	–1	1	0.500	AFC
154	Laos	1	2	0	1	1	0	4	−4	1	0.500	AFC
155	Central African Republic	2	3	0	1	2	1	7	−6	1	0.333	CAF
156	Eritrea	2	4	0	1	3	8	16	−8	1	0.250	CAF
157	Sierra Leone	2	4	0	1	3	3	15	−12	1	0.250	CAF
158	Luxembourg	2	6	0	1	5	4	29	−25	1	0.167	UEFA
159	Grenada	3	9	0	1	8	3	50	−47	1	0.111	CONCACAF
160	North Macedonia (2021–); Macedonia (2009–2018)	2	18	0	1	17	9	142	−133	1	0.056	UEFA
161	Botswana	2	4	0	0	4	3	10	−7	0	0.000	CAF
162	British Virgin Islands	1	2	0	0	2	1	8	−7	0	0.000	CONCACAF
163	Djibouti	1	1	0	0	1	0	7	−7	0	0.000	CAF
164	Kosovo	1	3	0	0	3	3	12	−9	0	0.000	UEFA
165	Andorra	1	3	0	0	3	0	13	−13	0	0.000	UEFA
166	Comoros	1	1	0	0	1	0	13	−13	0	0.000	CAF
167	Libya	1	2	0	0	2	0	15	−15	0	0.000	CAF
168	São Tomé and Príncipe	2	4	0	0	4	0	17	−17	0	0.000	CAF
169	Eswatini (2023–); Swaziland (1998–2019)	2	4	0	0	4	1	18	−17	0	0.000	CAF
170	Bahamas	1	3	0	0	3	1	19	−18	0	0.000	CONCACAF
171	Iraq	1	5	0	0	5	0	22	−22	0	0.000	AFC
172	Mongolia	1	2	0	0	2	0	24	–24	0	0.000	AFC
173	Bangladesh	2	5	0	0	5	0	25	−25	0	0.000	AFC
174	Guadeloupe	1	3	0	0	3	0	27	−27	0	0.000	CONCACAF
175	Turks and Caicos Islands	3	8	0	0	8	1	31	−30	0	0.000	CONCACAF
176	American Samoa	2	5	0	0	5	0	35	−35	0	0.000	OFC
177	Belize	2	5	0	0	5	2	40	−38	0	0.000	CONCACAF
178	Syria	1	4	0	0	4	0	38	−38	0	0.000	AFC
179	Maldives	2	6	0	0	6	0	40	−40	0	0.000	AFC
180	Armenia	1	8	0	0	8	1	42	−41	0	0.000	UEFA
181	Kuwait	1	3	0	0	3	1	51	−50	0	0.000	AFC
182	Guam	4	12	0	0	12	3	81	−78	0	0.000	AFC
183	Burundi	0	0	0	0	0	0	0	0	0	0.000	CAF
184	Cyprus	0	0	0	0	0	0	0	0	0	0.000	UEFA
185	Guinea-Bissau	0	0	0	0	0	0	0	0	0	0.000	CAF
186	Liberia	0	0	0	0	0	0	0	0	0	0.000	CAF
187	Mauritania	0	0	0	0	0	0	0	0	0	0.000	CAF
188	Niger	0	0	0	0	0	0	0	0	0	0.000	CAF
189	South Sudan	0	0	0	0	0	0	0	0	0	0.000	CAF
190	Bhutan	0	0	0	0	0	0	0	0	0	0.000	AFC
191	Cambodia	0	0	0	0	0	0	0	0	0	0.000	AFC
192	Cape Verde	0	0	0	0	0	0	0	0	0	0.000	CAF
193	Gibraltar	0	0	0	0	0	0	0	0	0	0.000	UEFA
194	Liechtenstein	0	0	0	0	0	0	0	0	0	0.000	UEFA
195	Pakistan	0	0	0	0	0	0	0	0	0	0.000	AFC
196	Saudi Arabia	0	0	0	0	0	0	0	0	0	0.000	AFC
197	Sri Lanka	0	0	0	0	0	0	0	0	0	0.000	AFC
198	Timor-Leste	0	0	0	0	0	0	0	0	0	0.000	AFC
199	Turkmenistan	0	0	0	0	0	0	0	0	0	0.000	AFC

=== Other ===
List updated after 2023 qualification

Year	First matches	Last matches	First goal	Last goal
1991	Finland 0–1 Norway (9 September 1989)	Germany 3–1 (a.e.t.) Norway (14 July 1991)	(Norway) Sissel Grude	(Germany) Silvia Neid
1995	Lithuania 0–11 Denmark (15 August 1993)	Germany 3–2 Sweden (26 March 1995)	(Denmark) Helle Jensen	(Sweden) Anneli Andelén
1999	Lithuania 3–2 Estonia (16 August 1997)	Argentina 2–3 Mexico (19 December 1998)	(Lithuania) Božena Stancik	(Mexico) Evelyn López
2003	Ukraine 4–1 Czech Republic (25 August 2001)	Japan 2–0 Mexico (12 July 2003)	(Ukraine) Tetyana Verezubova	(Japan) Karina Maruyama
2007	Vietnam 6–1 Philippines (12 June 2005)	Mexico 2–1 Japan (17 March 2007)	(Vietnam) Bùi Thị Tuyết Mai	(Mexico) Maribel Domínguez
2011	Kyrgyzstan 1–7 Jordan (25 April 2009)	United States 1–0 Italy (27 November 2010)	(Jordan) Farah Al-Azab	(United States) Amy Rodriguez
2015	Faroe Islands 3–3 Montenegro (4 April 2013)	Trinidad and Tobago 0–1 Ecuador (2 December 2014)	(Montenegro) Marija Vukčević	(Ecuador) Mónica Quinteros
2019	North Korea 8–0 India (3 April 2017)	Fiji 0–8 New Zealand (1 December 2018)	(North Korea) Ri Un-yong	(New Zealand) Rosie White
2023	Turkey 1–1 Portugal (16 September 2021)	Paraguay 0–1 Panama (23 February 2023)	(Turkey) Yağmur Uraz	(Panama) Lineth Cedeño

Footnotes

== See also ==
- National team appearances in the FIFA Women's World Cup
- FIFA World Cup qualification
