= Asian nations at the FIFA Women's World Cup =

Association football is among the most popular sports in Asia, with nine members of the Asian Football Confederation having competed at the sport's biggest international event, the FIFA Women's World Cup.

The highest ranked result in the Women's World Cup for an Asian team is 1st place in the 2011 FIFA Women's World Cup by Japan, the first Asian nation to achieve this feat at either men's or women's World Cup. China and Australia also finished runner-up and fourth place at 1999 FIFA Women's World Cup and 2023 FIFA Women's World Cup, making with Japan the only three AFC women's national teams to finishing onto the top four of the FIFA Women's World Cup

== Overview ==
	1991 (China) (12)	1995 (Sweden) (12)	1999 (United States) (16)	2003 (United States) (16)	2007 (China) (16)	2011 (Germany) (16)	2015 (Canada) (24)	2019 (France) (24)	2023 (Australia) (New Zealand) (32)	2027 (Brazil) (32)	2031 (Costa Rica) (Jamaica) (Mexico) (United States) (48)	2035 (England) (Northern Ireland) (Scotland) (Wales) (48)	Total
Teams	(China) (Chinese Taipei) (Japan)	(China) (Japan)	(China) (Japan) (North Korea)	(China) (Japan) (North Korea) (South Korea)	(China) (Japan) (North Korea) (Australia)	(Japan) (North Korea) (Australia)	(China) (Japan) (Australia) (South Korea) (Thailand)	(China) (Japan) (Australia) (South Korea) (Thailand)	(China) (Japan) (Australia) (South Korea) (Philippines) (Vietnam)	(China) (Japan) (North Korea) (South Korea) (Australia) (Philippines)			35
Top 16	—	—	—	—	—	—	4	3	2				9
Top 8	2	2	1	1	3	2	3	0	2				14
Top 4	0	1	1	0	0	1	1	0	1				4
Top 2	0	0	1	0	0	1	1	0	0				3
1st						(Japan)							1
2nd			(China)				(Japan)						2
3rd													0
4th		(China)							(Australia)				2

Country	#	Years	Best result
Japan	9	1991, 1995, 1999, 2003, 2007, 2011, 2015, 2019, 2023	1st
China	8	1991, 1995, 1999, 2003, 2007, 2015, 2019, 2023	2nd
Australia (Note: Football Federation Australia, now known as Football Australia, officially left the OFC and joined the AFC on 1 January 2006. They qualified in 1995, 1999 and 2003 as a member of OFC.)	8	(1995, 1999, 2003), 2007, 2011, 2015, 2019, 2023	4th
North Korea	4	1999, 2003, 2007, 2011	QF
South Korea	4	2003, 2015, 2019, 2023	R2
Philippines	2	2023, 2027	GS
Thailand	2	2015, 2019	GS
Chinese Taipei	1	1991	QF
Vietnam	1	2023	GS

== Results ==
=== Most finishes in the top four ===
Team	#	Top-four finishes
Japan	2	2011, 2015
China	2	1995, 1999
Australia	1	2023

=== Team results by tournament ===
Legend

- 1st — Champions
- 2nd — Runners-up
- 3rd — Third place
- 4th — Fourth place
- QF — Quarter-finals
- R2 — Round 2
- R1 — Round 1

- Q — Qualified for upcoming tournament
- TBD — To be determined (may still qualify for upcoming tournament)
- •• — Qualified but withdrew
- • — Did not qualify
- × — Did not enter / Withdrew / Banned
- — Hosts
- — Not affiliated in FIFA

The team ranking in each tournament is according to FIFA. The rankings, apart from the top four positions, are not a result of direct competition between the teams; instead, teams eliminated in the same round are ranked by their full results in the tournament. In recent tournaments, FIFA has used the rankings for seedings for the final tournament draw.

For each tournament, the number of teams in each finals tournament (in brackets) are shown.

Team	1991 (China) (12)	1995 (Sweden) (12)	1999 (United States) (16)	2003 (United States) (16)	2007 (China) (16)	2011 (Germany) (16)	2015 (Canada) (24)	2019 (France) (24)	2023 (Australia) (New Zealand) (32)	2027 (Brazil) (32)	2031 (Mexico) (United States) (48)	2035 (England) (Northern Ireland) (Scotland) (Wales) (48)	Total	Qual. Comp.
Australia	•	R1; 12th	R1; 11th	R1; 13th	QF; 6th	QF; 8th	QF; 7th	R2; 9th	4th	Q	TBD	TBD	8	12
Australia	Member of OFC				QF; 6th	QF; 8th	QF; 7th	R2; 9th	4th	Q	TBD	TBD	8	12
China	QF; 5th	4th	2nd	QF; 6th	QF; 5th	•	QF; 8th	R2; 14th	R1; 23rd	Q	TBD	TBD	8	12
Chinese Taipei	QF; 8th	•	•	•	•	•	•	•	•	TBD	TBD	TBD	1	12
Japan	R1; 12th	QF; 8th	R1; T-13th	R1; 10th	R1; T-10th	1st	2nd	R2; 13th	QF; 5th	Q	TBD	TBD	9	12
North Korea	•	×	R1; 10th	R1; 11th	QF; 8th	R1; 13th	×	•	×	Q	TBD	TBD	4	9
Philippines	×	•	•	•	•	×	•	•	R1; 24th	Q	TBD	TBD	1	10
South Korea	•	•	•	R1; 14th	•	•	R2; 14th	R1; 21st	R1; 28th	Q	TBD	TBD	4	12
Thailand	•	×	×	•	•	•	R1; 17th	R1; 24th	•	•	TBD	TBD	2	10
Vietnam	×	×	×	•	•	•	•	•	R1; 32nd	•	TBD	TBD	1	9

=== Tournament standings ===
Team	Champions	Finals	Semi-finals	Quarter-finals	Second round
Japan	1	1	0	2	1
China	0	1	1	4	1
Australia	0	0	1	3	1
North Korea	0	0	0	1	0
South Korea	0	0	0	0	1

=== Overall team records ===
As per statistical convention in football, matches decided in extra time are counted as wins and losses, while matches decided by penalty shoot-outs are counted as draws. 3 points per win, 1 point per draw and 0 points per loss.

Results through 2019 FIFA Women's World Cup

Team	Pld	W	D	L	GF	GA	GD	Pts
China	33	16	7	10	53	32	+21	55
Japan	33	14	4	15	39	59	–20	46
Australia	26	7	6	13	38	50	–12	27
North Korea	13	3	2	8	12	20	–8	11
South Korea	10	1	1	8	6	27	–21	4
Chinese Taipei	4	1	0	3	2	15	–13	3
Thailand	6	1	0	5	4	30	–26	3

== Appearances ==
=== Ranking of teams by number of appearances ===
Team	Appearances	Record streak	Active streak	Debut	Most recent	Best result (* = hosts)
Japan	9	9	9	1991	2023	Champions (2011)
China	8	5	3	1991	2023	Runners-up (1999)
Australia	8	8	8	1995	2023	Fourth place (2023)
North Korea	4	4	0	1999	2011	Quarter-finals (2007)
South Korea	4	3	3	2003	2023	Round of 16 (2015)
Thailand	2	2	0	2015	2019	Group stage (2015, 2019)
Chinese Taipei	1	1	0	1991	1991	Quarter-finals (1991)
Philippines	1	1	1	2023	2023	Group stage (2023)
Vietnam	1	1	1	2023	2023	Group stage (2023)

=== Team debuts ===
Year	Debutants	Total
1991	China, Chinese Taipei, Japan	3
1995	Australia	1
1999	North Korea	1
2003	South Korea	1
2015	Thailand	1
2023	Philippines, Vietnam	2
Total		9

== Summary of performance ==
This table shows the number of countries represented at the Women's World Cup, the number of entries (#E) from around the world including any rejections and withdrawals, the number of Asian entries (#A), how many of those Asian entries withdrawn (#A-) before/during qualification or were rejected by FIFA, the Asian representatives at the Women's World Cup finals, the number of World Cup Qualifiers each Asian representative had to play to get to the World Cup (#WCQ), the furthest stage reached, results, and coaches.

Year	Host	Size	#E	#A	#A-	Asian finalists	#WCQ	Stage	Results	Coach
1991	China	12	48	9	0	China	5	Quarter-finals	won 4–0 Norway, drew 2–2 Denmark, won 4–1 New Zealand, lost 0–1 Sweden	(China) Shang Ruihua
1991	China	12	48	9	0	Chinese Taipei	5	Quarter-finals	lost 0–5 Italy, lost 0–3 Germany, won 2–0 Nigeria, lost 0–7 United States	(Chinese Taipei) Chong Tsu-pin
1991	China	12	48	9	0	Japan	6	Group stage	lost 0–1 Brazil, lost 0–8 Sweden, lost 0–3 United States	(Japan) Tamotsu Suzuki
1995	Sweden	12	55	4	0	China	4	Fourth place	drew 3–3 United States, won 4–2 Australia, won 3–1 Denmark, drew 1–1 Sweden (won 4–3 (p)), lost 0–1 Germany, lost 0–2 United States	(China) Ma Yuanan
1995	Sweden	12	55	4	0	Japan	4	Quarter-finals	lost 0–1 Germany, won 2–1 Brazil, lost 0–2 Sweden, lost 0–4 United States	(Japan) Tamotsu Suzuki
1999	United States	16	67	11	0	China	5	Runners-up	won 2–1 Sweden, won 7–0 Ghana, won 3–1 Australia, won 2–0 Russia, won 5–0 Norway, drew 0–0 United States (lost 4–5 (p))	(China) Ma Yuanan
1999	United States	16	67	11	0	Japan	5	Group stage	drew 1–1 Canada, lost 0–5 Russia, lost 0–4 Norway	(Japan) Satoshi Miyauchi
1999	United States	16	67	11	0	North Korea	5	Group stage	lost 1–2 Nigeria, won 3–1 Denmark, lost 0–3 United States	(North Korea) Myong Dong-chan
2003	United States	16	99	14	0	China	5	Quarter-finals	won 1–0 Ghana, drew 1–1 Australia, won 1–0 Russia, lost 0–1 Canada	(China) Ma Liangxing
2003	United States	16	99	14	0	Japan	6	Group stage	won 6–0 Argentina, lost 0–3 Germany, lost 1–3 Canada	(Japan) Eiji Ueda
2003	United States	16	99	14	0	North Korea	6	Group stage	won 3–0 Nigeria, lost 0–1 Sweden, lost 0–3 United States	(North Korea) Ri Song-gun
2003	United States	16	99	14	0	South Korea	6	Group stage	lost 0–3 Brazil, lost 0–1 France, lost 1–7 Norway	(South Korea) An Jong-goan
2007	China	16	120	9	0	Australia	6	Quarter-finals	won 4–1 Ghana, drew 1–1 Norway, drew 2–2 Canada, lost 2–3 Brazil	(Scotland) Tom Sermanni
2007	China	16	120	9	0	China	5	Quarter-finals	won 3–2 Denmark, lost 0–4 Brazil, won 2–0 New Zealand, lost 0–1 Norway	(Sweden) Marika Domanski-Lyfors
2007	China	16	120	9	0	Japan	5	Group stage	drew 2–2 England, won 1–0 Argentina, lost 0–2 Germany	(Japan) Hiroshi Ohashi
2007	China	16	120	9	0	North Korea	6	Quarter-finals	drew 2–2 United States, won 2–0 Nigeria, lost 1–2 Sweden, lost 0–3 Germany	(North Korea) Kim Kwang-min
2011	Germany	16	125	17	1	Australia	5	Quarter-finals	lost 0–1 Brazil, won 3–2 Equatorial Guinea, won 2–1 Norway, lost 1–3 Sweden	(Scotland) Tom Sermanni
2011	Germany	16	125	17	1	Japan	5	Champions	won 2–1 New Zealand, won 4–0 Mexico, lost 0–2 England, won 1–0 Germany (a.e.t.), won 3–1 Sweden, drew 2–2 United States (won 3–1 (p))	(Japan) Norio Sasaki
2011	Germany	16	125	17	1	North Korea	5	Group stage	lost 0–2 United States, lost 0–1 Sweden, drew 0–0 Colombia	(North Korea) Kim Kwang-min
2015	Canada	24	134	20	0	Australia	5	Quarter-finals	lost 1–3 United States, won 2–0 Nigeria, drew 1–1 Sweden, won 1–0 Brazil, lost 0–1 Japan	(Australia) Alen Stajcic
2015	Canada	24	134	20	0	China	5	Quarter-finals	lost 0–1 Canada, won 1–0 Netherlands, drew 2–2 New Zealand, won 1–0 Cameroon, lost 0–1 United States	(China) Hao Wei
2015	Canada	24	134	20	0	Japan	5	Runners-up	won 1–0 Switzerland, won 2–1 Cameroon, won 1–0 Ecuador, won 2–1 Netherlands, won 1–0 Australia, won 2–1 England, lost 2–5 United States	(Japan) Norio Sasaki
2015	Canada	24	134	20	0	South Korea	5	Round of 16	lost 0–2 Brazil, drew 2–2 Costa Rica, won 2–1 Spain, lost 0–3 France	(South Korea) Yoon Deok-yeo
2015	Canada	24	134	20	0	Thailand	8	Group stage	lost 0–4 Germany, won 3–2 Ivory Coast, lost 0–4 Norway	(Thailand) Nuengrutai Srathongvian
2019	France	24	144	24	2	Australia	5	Round of 16	lost 1–2 Italy, won 3–2 Brazil, won 4–1 Jamaica, drew 1–1 Norway (lost 1–4 (p))	(Australia) Ante Milicic
2019	France	24	144	24	2	China	5	Round of 16	lost 0–1 Germany, won 1–0 South Africa, drew 0–0 Spain, lost 0–2 Italy	(China) Jia Xiuquan
2019	France	24	144	24	2	Japan	5	Round of 16	drew 0–0 Argentina, won 2–1 Scotland, lost 0–2 England, lost 1–2 Netherlands	(Japan) Asako Takakura
2019	France	24	144	24	2	South Korea	8	Group stage	lost 0–4 France, lost 0–2 Nigeria, lost 1–2 Norway	(South Korea) Yoon Deok-yeo
2019	France	24	144	24	2	Thailand	7	Group stage	lost 0–13 United States, lost 1–5 Sweden, lost 0–2 Chile	(Thailand) Nuengrutai Srathongvian
2023	Australia; New Zealand	32	172	27	4	Australia	4	Fourth place	won 1–0 Republic of Ireland, lost 2–3 Nigeria, won 4–0 Canada, won 2–0 Denmark, drew 0–0 France (won 7–6 (p)), lost 1–3 England, lost 0–2 Sweden	(Sweden) Tony Gustavsson
2023	Australia; New Zealand	32	172	27	4	China	5	Group stage	lost 0–1 Denmark, won 1–0 Haiti, lost 1–6 England	(China) Shui Qingxia
2023	Australia; New Zealand	32	172	27	4	Japan	5	Quarter-finals	won 5–0 Zambia, won 2–0 Costa Rica, won 4–0 Spain, won 3–1 Norway, lost 1–2 Sweden	(Japan) Futoshi Ikeda
2023	Australia; New Zealand	32	172	27	4	Philippines	7	Group stage	lost 0–2 Switzerland, won 1–0 New Zealand, lost 0–6 Norway	(Australia) Alen Stajcic
2023	Australia; New Zealand	32	172	27	4	South Korea	8	Group stage	lost 0–2 Colombia, lost 0–1 Morocco, drew 1–1 Germany	(England) Colin Bell
2023	Australia; New Zealand	32	172	27	4	Vietnam	8	Group stage	lost 0–3 United States, lost 0–2 Portugal, lost 0–7 Netherlands	(Vietnam) Mai Đức Chung

== Not yet qualified ==
37 of the 46 active FIFA and AFC members have never appeared in the final tournament.

Legend

- TBD — To be determined (may still qualify for upcoming tournament)
- • — Did not qualify
- × — Did not enter / Withdrew / Banned
- — Not affiliated in FIFA
- •• — Qualified, but withdrew before Finals

Country	Number of Qualifying attempts	1991 (China)	1995 (Sweden)	1999 (United States)	2003 (United States)	2007 (China)	2011 (Germany)	2015 (Canada)	2019 (France)	2023 (Australia) (New Zealand)	2027 (Brazil)	2031 (Mexico) (United States)	2035 (England) (Northern Ireland) (Scotland) (Wales)
Afghanistan	0	×	×	×	×	×	×	×	×	×	TBD	TBD	TBD
Bahrain	3	×	×	×	×	×	×	•	•	•	TBD	TBD	TBD
Bangladesh	2	×	×	×	×	×	×	•	×	•	TBD	TBD	TBD
Bhutan	0	×	×	×	×	×	×	×	×	×	TBD	TBD	TBD
Brunei	0	×	×	×	×	×	×	×	×	×	TBD	TBD	TBD
Cambodia	0	×	×	×	×	×	×	×	×	×	TBD	TBD	TBD
Guam	4	×	×	•	•	•	×	×	×	•	TBD	TBD	TBD
Hong Kong	9	•	•	•	•	•	•	•	•	•	TBD	TBD	TBD
India	5	×	×	•	•	•	•	×	•	×	TBD	TBD	TBD
Indonesia	2	×	×	×	×	•	×	×	×	•	TBD	TBD	TBD
Iran	4	×	×	×	×	×	•	•	•	•	TBD	TBD	TBD
Iraq	1	×	×	×	×	×	×	×	•	×	TBD	TBD	TBD
Israel	0	Not a member of AFC											
Jordan	4	×	×	×	×	×	•	•	•	•	TBD	TBD	TBD
Kazakhstan	1	×^{1}	×	•	×	Not a member of AFC							
Kuwait	0	×	×	×	×	×	×	×	×	×	TBD	TBD	TBD
Kyrgyzstan	2	×^{1}	×	×	×	×	•	•	×	×	TBD	TBD	TBD
Laos	1	×	×	×	×	×	×	×	×	•	TBD	TBD	TBD
Lebanon	2	×	×	×	×	×	×	•	×	•	TBD	TBD	TBD
Macau	0	×	×	×	×	×	×	×	×	×	TBD	TBD	TBD
Malaysia	2	•	×	×	×	×	×	×	×	•	TBD	TBD	TBD
Maldives	3	×	×	×	×	•	•	×	×	•	TBD	TBD	TBD
Mongolia	1	×	×	×	×	×	×	×	×	•	TBD	TBD	TBD
Myanmar	6	×	×	×	•	•	•	•	•	•	TBD	TBD	TBD
Nepal	1	×	×	×	×	×	×	×	×	•	TBD	TBD	TBD
Oman	0	×	×	×	×	×	×	×	×	×	TBD	TBD	TBD
Pakistan	0	×	×	×	×	×	×	×	×	×	TBD	TBD	TBD
Palestine	4	×	×	×	×	×	•	•	•	•	TBD	TBD	TBD
Qatar	0	×	×	×	×	×	×	×	×	×	TBD	TBD	TBD
Saudi Arabia	0	×	×	×	×	×	×	×	×	×	TBD	TBD	TBD
Singapore	2	•	×	×	•	×	×	×	×	×	TBD	TBD	TBD
Sri Lanka	0	×	×	×	×	×	×	×	×	×	TBD	TBD	TBD
Syria	1	×	×	×	×	×	×	×	•	×	TBD	TBD	TBD
Tajikistan	2	×^{1}	×	×	×	×	×	×	•	•	TBD	TBD	TBD
Timor-Leste	0	Part of Indonesia			×	×	×	×	×	×	TBD	TBD	TBD
Turkmenistan	0	×^{1}	×	×	×	×	×	×	×	×	TBD	TBD	TBD
United Arab Emirates	2	×	×	×	×	×	×	×	•	•	TBD	TBD	TBD
Uzbekistan	7	×^{1}	×	•	•	•	•	•	•	•	TBD	TBD	TBD
Yemen	0	×	×	×	×	×	×	×	×	×	TBD	TBD	TBD

Notes:

- ^{1}Part of Soviet Union

== Competitive history ==
=== 1991: Three Asian debutants ===
China, Japan and Chinese Taipei became the first Asian countries to compete at the FIFA Women's World Cup, with China honoured to become the first country to host the first-ever FIFA Women's World Cup in 1991. While China qualified throughout hosting it, Japan and Chinese Taipei only qualified to the tournament throughout the 1991 AFC Women's Championship by finishing second and third, respectively. The Japanese were not successful, finishing bottom after three defeats to Brazil, Sweden and the United States. The hosts China and its neighbour Chinese Taipei were far more successful, but neither managed to go beyond the quarter-finals, losing to Sweden and the United States (which eliminated Japan from the group stage) respectively.

=== 1995: lesser Asian teams, but more promising results ===
Chinese Taipei failed to qualify for the tournament after the 1994 Asian Games, leaving China and Japan as lone Asian representatives in the 1995 edition held in Sweden. However, despite the initial setback, the World Cup proved to be a major success for both teams. Japan faced major difficulties after being drawn in group A with hosts Sweden, as well as Brazil and Germany, but managed to stun the Brazilians 2–1 to qualify for the quarter-finals for the first time, where its journey ended with a 0–4 thumping by then-defending champions United States. China, meanwhile, impressed even better, reaching the semi-finals, but had its chance prevented by eventual runners-up Germany, before losing the third place to the United States.

=== 1999: first Asian nation in a FIFA World Cup Final ===
The 1999 edition in the United States was a historic moment for Asia. Three nations qualified to the World Cup via the 1997 AFC Women's Championship, with China and Japan again made their appearances, while North Korea debuted. Japan, after the 1995 success, could not replicate that performance, finishing bottom of the group after just a draw with Canada and two hammering defeats to Russia and Norway. North Korea also failed to progress to knockout phase, but salvaged a 3–1 win over Denmark to avoid finishing last. China was the most successful, winning five games in a row, including the 5–0 triumph over then-champions Norway to reach the final, where the Chinese managed to hold the United States goalless, but lost on penalty shootout 4–5. Nonetheless, China's appearance meant for the first time, a World Cup final featured a team from Asia.

=== 2003: SARS outbreak and a less successful show ===
Initially, China was awarded the rights to host the 2003 edition, but SARS outbreak forced China to relinquish the rights to host, subsequently moved back to 1999 hosts United States. That World Cup saw a record debutant from Asia to four, with three teams in 1999 edition and the newcomer South Korea, but the 1999 momentum was not repeated. China topped the group after beating Ghana, Russia and drawing Australia, but lost to Canada in the last eight. Japan and North Korea disappointed by only winning one single game in the group stage and could not reach the last eight. South Korea, being the debutant, could not make any surprise at all, losing all three games to Brazil, France and Norway, scoring just one in process.

=== 2007: going back to Asia, Australia's first WWC in AFC and some improvement ===
After relinquishing the rights to host the 2003 edition due to SARS, China was awarded the rights to host the 2007 edition without contesting. This tournament marked Australia's first entrance to the World Cup as an AFC member, having competed in three previous World Cups as an OFC member. This World Cup saw three Asian teams reached the knockout stage for the first time ever: China reached the last eight after finishing second, behind eventual runners-up Brazil, but fell to Norway 0–1, repeating its 1991's quarter-finals defeat to a Nordic team; North Korea overcame Sweden by goal difference to qualify for the knockout stage for the first time despite losing 1–2 against the Swedes (thanked to North Korea's impressive 2–2 draw over powerhouse United States), before losing 0–3 to the eventual winner Germany; Australia also reached the last eight for the first time, having beaten Ghana 4–1 before holding both Norway and Canada to progress, where Australia lost to Brazil 2–3. Japan, once again, failed to impress, gaining four points out of three games, including its only 1–0 win over Argentina, and got eliminated from the group stage.

=== 2011: History made, first Asian champions: Nadeshiko Japan ===
The 2011 tournament in Germany marked two watershed moments in Asian women's football. The tournament saw China absent for the first time in the history, after failing to win third in the 2010 AFC Women's Asian Cup; three Asian World Cup participants were Japan, Australia and North Korea. However, what would follow turn to be one of the greatest feat ever in Asian football history. Australia successfully reached the quarter-finals for the second time in a row, including the famous 2–1 win over former champions Norway, which sent Norway out in process, before losing 1–3 to Sweden. Japan, meanwhile, did the unthinkable by conquering the tournament, including three wins over three women's football titans in the knockout stage (Germany, Sweden and the United States); with England being the only team Japan lost in process. The Japanese victory was even more unthinkable considering the country had just suffered from the disastrous 2011 Tōhoku earthquake and tsunami that led to the cancellation of the women's league, thus turning the win as the greatest giant-killing miracle in modern history. North Korea turned out to be the only Asian team to impress nothing in the tournament, losing to the United States and Sweden, before drawing Colombia goalless and crashed out of the group stage with no goal and just a point.

=== 2015: Japan almost stroke again, new record of participants ===
2015 edition in Canada marked history for Asia when five Asian teams participated, with Japan as the defending champions. China returned to World Cup after missing the 2011 tournament, while South Korea returned since 2003. Thailand marked its first entrance to the World Cup after beating Vietnam in the 2014 AFC Women's Asian Cup play-offs, leaving Australia (other than Japan) the only team to have a stable competing streak. The tournament was another success for almost every Asian team: China, in its return, reached the quarter-finals, beating the Netherlands, New Zealand and Cameroon, but lost to United States; Australia gained a historic record by winning the first-ever knockout stage game, a shock 1–0 win over Brazil, to reach the last eight, where they lost to Japan; South Korea overcame rising powerhouse Spain 2–1 to eliminate the Spaniards in process before losing to France 0–3; while Japan was the most successful, again reached the final of the World Cup after recording six one-goal margin wins in the tournament, even against weaker opponents like Ecuador, but had its dream to win the second World Cup in a row dashed by the Americans, who took revenge of the 2011 loss. Thailand was the only team from Asia to fail to reach the knockout stage, yet Thailand came close to qualify, including a 3–2 group stage win over debutant Ivory Coast.

North Korea, four-time World Cup participant, was disqualified after its players being tested of doping found positive.

=== 2019: disappointment for Asia ===
The 2019 Women's World Cup in France marked another history for Asia, albeit this was poorly perceived. With the same participants came from the 2018 AFC Women's Asian Cup, hopes were high. Yet for the first time ever, no country from Asia was able to qualify for the quarter-finals, made it the poorest performance for Asian football at the Women's World Cup.

Former champions Japan performed not impressive in the group stage, being held drawn goalless to Argentina before beating Scotland 2–1, but lost to England 0–2 before having its journey ended with the 1–2 loss to the Dutch. China also performed poorly in the tournament, gaining only a single win and scored only a single goal, both against South Africa, before losing to Italy 0–2 in the last sixteen.

Australia was the only Asian team to truly put up more fights, beating Brazil 3-2 and Jamaica (with a historic Sam Kerr four-scoring goal match) in the group stage before holding former champions Norway despite being reduced to ten women, but lost on penalty shootout 1–4. South Korea lost all three group stage games to France 0–4, Nigeria 0–2 and Norway 1–2; while Thailand marked a dark chapter as the worst-performed team in the history of every FIFA Women's World Cup edition, including the historic 0–13 loss to eventual champions United States, the worst ever defeat at any senior FIFA tournament for men's or women's; subsequently Thailand fell 1–5 to Sweden and 0–2 to Chile to finish bottom with only a goal scored and 20 goals conceded.

=== 2023: record debutants, third time hosting and the historical Matildas at home ===
With Australia and New Zealand awarded the rights to host the 2023 edition, this marked the first ever FIFA Women's World Cup to be hosted by two countries. As for the result, Australia became the second AFC member to do so, and thus automatically qualified for the tournament as hosts. With the exception of Australia, the others had to qualify via the 2022 AFC Women's Asian Cup, which saw China, South Korea, Japan and the Philippines directly qualified, while Vietnam later qualified throughout the playoff stage.

Meanwhile Philippines, Vietnam, China and South Korea was eliminated on the group stage, Japan and Australia qualified. The Nadeshiko Japan after eliminates Norway on the Round of 16, they was eliminated by Sweden in the quarter-finals. Australia's Matildas (even with the absence of Sam Kerr for most of the tournament due to a calf injury), make history and for the first time they made it through onto semifinals after eliminating Denmark and favourites France in the longest penalty shoot-out decision in both men's and women's FIFA World Cup history. Unfortunately, Australia was eliminated by England in the semifinals and ends the tournament finishing in fourth place after loss 2-0 to Sweden.
