= African nations at the FIFA Women's World Cup =

Association football is among the most popular sports in Africa, with eight members of the Confederation of African Football having competed at the sport's biggest international event, the FIFA Women's World Cup. The highest ranked result in the Women's World Cup for an African team is quarter-finals in the 1999 FIFA Women's World Cup by Nigeria.

== Overview ==
	1991 (China) (12)	1995 (Sweden) (12)	1999 (United States) (16)	2003 (United States) (16)	2007 (China) (16)	2011 (Germany) (16)	2015 (Canada) (24)	2019 (France) (24)	2023 (Australia) (New Zealand) (32)	2027 (Brazil) (32)	2031 (Costa Rica) (Jamaica) (Mexico) (United States) (48)	2035 (England) (Northern Ireland) (Scotland) (Wales) (48)	Total
Teams	(Nigeria)	(Nigeria)	(Nigeria) (Ghana)	(Nigeria) (Ghana)	(Nigeria) (Ghana)	(Nigeria) (Equatorial Guinea)	(Nigeria) (Cameroon) (Ivory Coast)	(Nigeria) (Cameroon) (South Africa)	(Nigeria) (South Africa) (Morocco) (Zambia)	(Cameroon) (Morocco) (Algeria) (Malawi)			20
Top 16	—	—	—	—	—	—	1	2	3				6
Top 8	0	0	1	0	0	0	0	0	0				1
Top 4	0	0	0	0	0	0	0	0	0				0
Top 2	0	0	0	0	0	0	0	0	0				0
1st													0
2nd													0
3rd													0
4th													0

Country	#	Years	Best result
Nigeria	9	1991, 1995, 1999, 2003, 2007, 2011, 2015, 2019, 2023	QF
Ghana	3	1999, 2003, 2007	GS
Cameroon	3	2015, 2019, 2027	R2
South Africa	2	2019, 2023	R2
Morocco	2	2023, 2027	R2
Equatorial Guinea	1	2011	GS
Ivory Coast	1	2015	GS
Zambia	1	2023	GS
Algeria	1	2027	TBD
Malawi	1	2027	TBD

== Results ==
=== Most finishes in the top four ===
None

=== Team results by tournament ===
Legend

- 1st — Champions
- 2nd — Runners-up
- 3rd — Third place
- 4th — Fourth place
- QF — Quarter-finals
- R2 — Round 2
- R1 — Round 1

- Q — Qualified for upcoming tournament
- TBD — To be determined (may still qualify for upcoming tournament)
- •• — Qualified but withdrew
- • — Did not qualify
- × — Did not enter / Withdrew / Banned
- — Hosts
- — Not affiliated in FIFA

The team ranking in each tournament is according to FIFA. The rankings, apart from the top four positions, are not a result of direct competition between the teams; instead, teams eliminated in the same round are ranked by their full results in the tournament. In recent tournaments, FIFA has used the rankings for seedings for the final tournament draw.

For each tournament, the number of teams in each finals tournament (in brackets) are shown.

Team	1991 (China) (12)	1995 (Sweden) (12)	1999 (United States) (16)	2003 (United States) (16)	2007 (China) (16)	2011 (Germany) (16)	2015 (Canada) (24)	2019 (France) (24)	2023 (Australia) (New Zealand) (32)	2027 (Brazil) (32)	2031 (Mexico) (United States) (48)	2035 (England) (Northern Ireland) (Scotland) (Wales) (48)	Total	Qual. Comp.
Algeria	×	×	×	×	•	•	•	•	•	Q	TBD	TBD	1	8
Cameroon	•	×	•	•	•	•	R2; 11th	R2; 15th	•	Q	TBD	TBD	3	11
Equatorial Guinea	×	×	×	•	•	R1; 15th	•	×	•	•	TBD	TBD	1	8
Ghana	•	•	R1; T-13th	R1; 12th	R1; 15th	•	•	•	•	TBD	TBD	TBD	3	12
Ivory Coast	×	×	×	•	•	•	R1; 23th	•	•	•	TBD	TBD	1	9
Malawi	×	×	×	×	•	×	×	×	•	Q	TBD	TBD	1	5
Morocco	×	×	•	•	•	•	•	•	R2; 12th	Q	TBD	TBD	2	10
Nigeria	R1; 10th	R1; 11th	QF; 7th	R1; 15th	R1; 13th	R1; 9th	R1; 21st	R2; 16th	R2; 10th	•	TBD	TBD	9	12
South Africa	×	•	•	•	•	•	•	R1; 22nd	R2; 16th	TBD	TBD	TBD	2	11
Zambia	×	•	×	•	•	×	•	•	R1; 25th	•	TBD	TBD	1	9

=== Tournament standings ===
Team	Champions	Finals	Semi-finals	Quarter-finals	Second round
Nigeria	0	0	0	1	2
Cameroon	0	0	0	0	2
Morocco	0	0	0	0	1
South Africa	0	0	0	0	1

=== Overall team records ===
As per statistical convention in football, matches decided in extra time are counted as wins and losses, while matches decided by penalty shoot-outs are counted as draws. 3 points per win, 1 point per draw and 0 points per loss.

Results through 2019 FIFA Women's World Cup

Team	Pld	W	D	L	GF	GA	GD	Pts
Nigeria	30	5	6	19	23	65	–42	21
Cameroon	8	3	0	5	12	12	0	9
Morocco	4	2	0	2	2	10	–8	6
Ghana	9	1	1	7	6	30	–24	4
South Africa	7	1	1	5	6	16	–10	4
Zambia	3	1	0	2	3	11	–8	3
Equatorial Guinea	3	0	0	3	2	7	–5	0
Ivory Coast	3	0	0	3	3	16	–13	0

== Appearances ==
=== Ranking of teams by number of appearances ===
Team	Appearances	Record streak	Active streak	Debut	Most recent	Best result (* = hosts)
Nigeria	9	9	9	1991	2023	Quarter-finals (1999)
Ghana	3	3	0	1999	2007	Group stage (1999, 2003, 2007)
Cameroon	2	2	0	2015	2019	Round of 16 (2015, 2019)
South Africa	2	2	2	2019	2023	Round of 16 (2023)
Equatorial Guinea	1	1	0	2011	2011	Group stage (2011)
Ivory Coast	1	1	0	2015	2015	Group stage (2015)
Morocco	1	1	1	2023	2023	Round of 16 (2023)
Zambia	1	1	1	2023	2023	Group stage (2023)

=== Team debuts ===
Year	Debutants	Total
1991	Nigeria	1
1999	Ghana	1
2011	Equatorial Guinea	1
2015	Cameroon, Ivory Coast	2
2019	South Africa	1
2023	Morocco, Zambia	2
2027	Algeria, Malawi	2
Total		10

== Summary of performance ==
This table shows the number of countries represented at the Women's World Cup, the number of entries (#E) from around the world including any rejections and withdrawals, the number of African entries (#A), how many of those African entries withdrawn (#A-) before/during qualification or were rejected by FIFA, the African representatives at the Women's World Cup finals, the number of World Cup Qualifiers each African representative had to play to get to the World Cup (#WCQ), the furthest stage reached, results, and coaches.

Year	Host	Size	#E	#A	#A-	African finalists	#WCQ	Stage	Results	Coach
1991	China	12	48	8	4	Nigeria	3	Group stage	lost 0–4 Germany, lost 0–1 Italy, lost 0–2 Chinese Taipei	(Netherlands) Jo Bonfrère
1995	Sweden	12	55	8	2	Nigeria	3	Group stage	lost 0–8 Norway, drew 3–3 Canada, lost 2–3 England	(Nigeria) Paul Hamilton
1999	United States	16	67	15	4	Ghana	4	Group stage	drew 1–1 Australia, lost 0–7 China, lost 0–2 Sweden	(Ghana) Emmanuel Kwasi Afranie
1999	United States	16	67	15	4	Nigeria	5	Quarter-finals	won 2–1 North Korea, lost 1–7 United States, won 2–0 Denmark, lost 3–4 Brazil (g.g.)	(Nigeria) Mabo Ismaila
2003	United States	16	99	22	3	Ghana	7	Group stage	lost 0–1 China, lost 0–3 Russia, won 2–1 Australia	(Ghana) Oko Aryee
2003	United States	16	99	22	3	Nigeria	5	Group stage	lost 0–3 North Korea, lost 0–5 United States, lost 0–3 Sweden	(Nigeria) Samuel Okpodu
2007	China	16	120	35	9	Ghana	5	Group stage	lost 1–4 Australia, lost 0–4 Canada, lost 2–7 Norway	(Ghana) Isaac Paha
2007	China	16	120	35	9	Nigeria	5	Group stage	drew 1–1 Sweden, lost 0–2 North Korea, lost 0–1 United States	(Nigeria) Ntiero Effiom
2011	Germany	16	125	24	4	Equatorial Guinea	6	Group stage	lost 0–1 Norway, lost 2–3 Australia, lost 0–3 Brazil	(Italy) (Brazil) Marcello Frigério
2011	Germany	16	125	24	4	Nigeria	5	Group stage	lost 0–1 France, lost 0–1 Germany, won 1–0 Canada	(Nigeria) Ngozi Eucharia Uche
2015	Canada	24	134	26	5	Cameroon	7	Round of 16	won 6–0 Ecuador, lost 1–2 Japan, won 2–1 Switzerland, lost 0–1 China	(Cameroon) Carl Enow
2015	Canada	24	134	26	5	Ivory Coast	9	Group stage	lost 0–10 Germany, lost 2–3 Thailand, lost 1–3 Norway	(Ivory Coast) Clémentine Touré
2015	Canada	24	134	26	5	Nigeria	7	Group stage	drew 3–3 Sweden, lost 0–2 Australia, lost 0–1 United States	(Nigeria) Edwin Okon
2019	France	24	144	25	1	Cameroon	7	Round of 16	lost 0–1 Canada, lost 1–3 Netherlands, won 2–1 New Zealand, lost 0–3 England	(Cameroon) Alain Djeumfa
2019	France	24	144	25	1	Nigeria	7	Round of 16	lost 0–3 Norway, won 2–0 South Korea, lost 0–1 France, lost 0–3 Germany	(Sweden) Thomas Dennerby
2019	France	24	144	25	1	South Africa	7	Group stage	lost 1–3 Spain, lost 0–1 China, lost 0–4 Germany	(South Africa) Desiree Ellis
2023	Australia; New Zealand	32	172	45	5	Morocco	6	Round of 16	lost 0–6 Germany, won 1–0 South Korea, won 1–0 Colombia, lost 0–4 France	(France) Reynald Pedros
2023	Australia; New Zealand	32	172	45	5	Nigeria	10	Round of 16	drew 0–0 Canada, won 3–2 Australia, drew 0–0 Republic of Ireland, drew 0–0 England (lost 2–4 (p))	(United States) Randy Waldrum
2023	Australia; New Zealand	32	172	45	5	South Africa	10	Round of 16	lost 1–2 Sweden, drew 2–2 Argentina, won 3–2 Italy, lost 0–2 Netherlands	(South Africa) Desiree Ellis
2023	Australia; New Zealand	32	172	45	5	Zambia	10	Group stage	lost 0–5 Japan, lost 0–5 Spain, won 3–1 Costa Rica	(Zambia) Bruce Mwape

== Not yet qualified ==
44 of the 54 active FIFA and CAF members have never appeared in the final tournament.

Legend

- TBD — To be determined (may still qualify for upcoming tournament)
- • — Did not qualify
- × — Did not enter / Withdrew / Banned
- — Not affiliated in FIFA
- •• — Qualified, but withdrew before Finals

Country	Number of Qualifying attempts	1991 (China)	1995 (Sweden)	1999 (United States)	2003 (United States)	2007 (China)	2011 (Germany)	2015 (Canada)	2019 (France)	2023 (Australia) (New Zealand)	2027 (Brazil)	2031 (Mexico) (United States)	2035 (England) (Northern Ireland) (Scotland) (Wales)
Angola	5	×	•	×	•	•	•	×	×	•	TBD	TBD	TBD
Benin	3	×	×	×	×	•	×	×	•	•	TBD	TBD	TBD
Botswana	4	×	×	×	×	×	•	•	•	•	TBD	TBD	TBD
Burundi	1	×	×	×	×	×	×	×	×	•	TBD	TBD	TBD
Cape Verde	0	×	×	×	×	×	×	×	×	×	TBD	TBD	TBD
Central African Republic	2	×	×	×	×	×	×	×	•	•	TBD	TBD	TBD
Chad	0	×	×	×	×	×	×	×	×	×	TBD	TBD	TBD
Comoros	1	×	×	×	×	×	×	•	×	×	TBD	TBD	TBD
Congo	2	×	×	×	×	×	×	×	•	•	TBD	TBD	TBD
Djibouti	1	×	×	×	×	×	×	×	×	•	TBD	TBD	TBD
DR Congo	4	×	×	•	•	•	•	×	×	×	TBD	TBD	TBD
Egypt	5	×	×	•	×	•	×	•	•	•	TBD	TBD	TBD
Eritrea	3	×	×	×	•	×	•	×	×	•	TBD	TBD	TBD
Ethiopia	5	×	×	×	•	×	•	•	•	•	TBD	TBD	TBD
Gabon	1	×	×	×	×	×	×	×	×	•	TBD	TBD	TBD
Gambia	2	×	×	×	×	×	×	×	•	•	TBD	TBD	TBD
Guinea	5	•	×	•	×	•	•	×	×	•	TBD	TBD	TBD
Guinea-Bissau	1	×	×	×	×	×	×	×	×	•	TBD	TBD	TBD
Kenya	4	×	×	×	×	•	×	•	•	•	TBD	TBD	TBD
Lesotho	1	×	×	×	×	×	×	•	×	×	TBD	TBD	TBD
Liberia	1	×	×	×	×	×	×	×	×	•	TBD	TBD	TBD
Libya	1	×	×	×	×	×	×	×	•	×	TBD	TBD	TBD
Madagascar	0	×	×	×	×	×	×	×	×	×	TBD	TBD	TBD
Mali	6	×	×	×	•	•	•	•	•	•	TBD	TBD	TBD
Mauritania	1	×	×	×	×	×	×	×	×	•	TBD	TBD	TBD
Mauritius	1	×	×	×	×	×	×	•	×	×	TBD	TBD	TBD
Mozambique	2	×	×	×	×	•	×	×	×	•	TBD	TBD	TBD
Namibia	5	×	×	×	×	•	•	•	•	•	TBD	TBD	TBD
Niger	1	×	×	×	×	×	×	×	×	•	TBD	TBD	TBD
Rwanda	1	×	×	×	×	×	×	•	×	×	TBD	TBD	TBD
São Tomé and Príncipe	3	×	×	×	•	•	×	×	×	•	TBD	TBD	TBD
Senegal	6	×	×	×	•	•	•	•	•	•	TBD	TBD	TBD
Seychelles	1	×	×	×	×	×	×	•	×	×	TBD	TBD	TBD
Sierra Leone	1	×	×	×	×	×	×	×	×	•	TBD	TBD	TBD
Somalia	0	×	×	×	×	×	×	×	×	×	TBD	TBD	TBD
South Sudan	2	Part of Sudan						•	×	•	TBD	TBD	TBD
Sudan	0	×	×	×	×	×	×	×	×	×	TBD	TBD	TBD
Tanzania	6	×	×	×	•	•	•	•	•	•	TBD	TBD	TBD
Togo	2	×	×	×	×	•	×	×	×	•	TBD	TBD	TBD
Tunisia	3	×	×	×	×	×	•	•	×	•	TBD	TBD	TBD
Uganda	4	×	×	•	•	×	×	×	•	•	TBD	TBD	TBD
Zimbabwe	4	×	×	×	•	×	×	•	•	•	TBD	TBD	TBD

== Competitive history ==
=== 1991: disappointing debut ===
With the first FIFA Women's World Cup in China, Nigeria became the only African representative in the tournament, having won the inaugural 1991 African Women's Championship after beating Cameroon. In the first World Cup for Africa's only representative, Nigeria had a disappointing show. Being drawn with Germany, Italy and Chinese Taipei in group C, Nigeria were completely obliterated in the tournament, with a heavy loss to Germany 0–5 and two hard-fought losses to Italy 0–1 and Chinese Taipei 0–2. Nigeria left the tournament pointless and goalless, which left Africa little to demonstrate at the women's world stage.

=== 1995: first point, but still the same ===
In the edition four years later in Sweden, the Nigerians were again Africa's only representative after beating South Africa in the final of the 1995 African Women's Championship. Drawn with Canada, England and eventual champions Norway, Nigeria finally achieved its first point, a 3–3 draw with North American opponent Canada; but defeats to England and especially, the heavy loss to Norway 0–8, sent Nigeria to bottom of the group, with Africa still failed to impress at the women's world stage.

=== 1999: historic win and record debutants ===
By reaching the final of the 1998 African Women's Championship, Nigeria and Ghana qualified for the World Cup held in the United States, with the latter being the historic debut. This World Cup marked for the first time, Nigeria managed to progress from the group stage, with two wins against debutant North Korea and European opponent Denmark proved the difference, making their heavy loss 1–7 to the United States only a temporary setback in Nigeria's success. The Nigerians then played all out against South American powerhouse Brazil, which saw Nigeria lost 3–4 due to a golden goal in extra time, making this World Cup Nigeria's most successful up to date. Ghana, on the other hand, was not successful, only acquired one point in the group stage, a 1–1 draw against Australia, with two heavy losses to China and Sweden condemned Ghana to bottom of the group D.

=== 2003: same participants but with disappointment ===
After the 1999 phenomenon, Nigeria and Ghana returned to the United States for the 2003 edition, hoping to repeat the same feat. However, the return proved to be a nightmare, with Nigeria found itself in group A against hosts and defending champions United States, alongside European giant Sweden and rising Asian power North Korea; Nigeria were totally humiliated after losing all three matches and conceding 11, scoring none, the first time since 1991 that Nigeria could not score a goal. Ghana was more impressive a bit in group D, earning a historic win against old foe Australia 2–1, but two earlier losses to China and Russia prevented Ghana from progressing.

=== 2007: same participants, with only worse performance ===
The 2007 edition held in China was the most disappointing performance for both Nigeria and Ghana, Africa's only representatives for a third consecutive time. Drawn in group B and, like 2003, again facing the United States, Sweden and North Korea, the Nigerians did a better work by holding Sweden 1–1, but defeats to North Korea and the United States condemned the Super Falcons to bottom place. Ghana, meanwhile, did even worse, losing all three games in group C, against Australia 1–4, Canada 0–4 and Norway 2–7, and ended up in bottom place as well. With only a point gained, Africa once again failed to impress at the women's stage.

=== 2011: change of debutant, but same old results ===
The 2011 World Cup in Germany marked the absence of Ghana – the two African representatives were Nigeria and Equatorial Guinea. Like 2003 and 2007, neither Nigeria and Equatorial Guinea could barely perform at its full extent in the competition as well. In Group A, Nigeria faced up against the hosts, powerhouse and then-world champions Germany, rising European power France and North American foe Canada; all what Nigeria could do was a win against Canada 1–0, while defeats with the same scoreline to Germany and France ended any automatic progression hope for the Super Falcons. Equatorial Guinea were drawn in group D, and faltered in the group stage with three straight defeats, although it did perform bravely against European giant Norway and Asian powerhouse Australia, losing just by one-goal margin before getting thumped 0–3 by Brazil.

=== 2015: historic debutants record and Africa's first roar in 16 years ===
The tournament in Canada witnessed Nigeria joining two new debutants, Cameroon and Ivory Coast, heading to the competition. Nigeria, drawn in group D, found itself in a tough situation against giants United States and Sweden, as well as Asian powerhouse Australia; all what Nigeria could do was an exciting 3–3 draw to Sweden, before two defeats to the Matildas and the Americans ended any hope to progress again. Ivory Coast, drawn with Germany, Norway and Thailand in group B, did terribly worse, including the 0–10 record loss to Germany, and finished last with no point. Ange N'Guessan was the Ivorians' main phenomenon, with her goal against Norway being nominated as one of the best in the tournament.

The other debutant, Cameroon, had done an exceptionally brilliant job as Nigeria and Ivory Coast failed. Being drawn in group C with Switzerland, Ecuador and world champions Japan, Cameroon impressed with two wins over Ecuador 6–0 and Switzerland 2–1, finished second and progressed to the knockout stage, where the Indomitable Lionesses lost to China 0–1 in the last sixteen. Nonetheless, Cameroon's success meant the Cameroonians became the second team in Africa to progress from the group stage, and the first to do so in 16 years.

=== 2019: history written for Africa ===
France 2019 saw Nigeria, Cameroon and debutant South Africa took part in the tournament as Africa's representatives. This tournament was historic for the continent — for the first time, two African teams booked places in the knockout stage. Nigeria were drawn in group A with hosts France, Norway and South Korea; the Super Falcons disappointed with two losses to France and Norway, but a necessary 2–0 win over Asian representative South Korea gave Nigeria third place, in which it ultimately progressed thanked to Chile's failure to score more than two goals against Thailand. Cameroon, meanwhile, had a hard time in a tough group with rising European power Netherlands and North American foe Canada, with Cameroon losing both games despite putting brave fights, it was only by the late goal from Ajara Nchout against New Zealand that Cameroon finally booked a place in the last sixteen as one of the best third-placed team. Both Nigeria and Cameroon went to crash out of that stage, losing to Germany and England with the same 0–3 scoreline.

South Africa, meanwhile, was Africa's only representative to fail to progress, although the draw had put South Africa to face sterner opponents. South Africa lost to Spain 1–3 after Thembi Kgatlana stunned with a goal lead in the first half, before falling to China and Germany 0–1 and 0–4 together.

=== 2023: record debutants and greater expectation ===
With the edition in Australia and New Zealand, the World Cup was expanded to 32 teams. Nigeria and South Africa, having participated in 2019 edition, will return to the World Cup in 2023, joined by two new debutants, Zambia and Morocco.

South Africa and Morocco made to knockout stage for the first time ever, along with Nigeria also reached the knockout stage as well, although all of them were eliminated in round of 16.

In this tournament,Nigeria drawn with Co-host Australia, Olympics champions Canada, and European team Republic of Ireland. Nigeria drew 0-0 against Canada and Republic of Ireland, won against Co-host Australia to progress to the Round of 16 where they lost 4-2 on penalties to eventual finalist, England. Making it the first tournament in which an African team did not lose any match in regulation time in the whole tournament.

Morocco drawn with European giant Germany, South American powerhouse Colombia and Asian Powerhouse Korea Republic recorded a heavy defeat against Germany, losing 6-0, won respectively against Korea Republic and Colombia matches by a 1-0 scoreline with Germany failing to make it out of the group for the first time, before bowing out to quarterfinalist by a 4-0 loss. Making them the first African team to record consecutive wins in a women's world cup.

South Africa drawn with European powerhouse Sweden and Italy, and also South American Powerhouse Argentina lost their opening match against Sweden 2-1 after taking the lead, they were held to a 2-2 draw against Argentina after they were 2 goals up, then they rallied back against Italy 3-2 in a dramatic fashion to progress for the first time to the Round of 16, where they lost 2-0 to quarterfinalist Netherlands. Making it the first time that Africa will have 3 of her team progressing from the group stage

Zambia drawn against Asian powerhouse Japan, eventual champions Spain and North American representative Costa Rica were blown away in their first two matches 5-0 respectively against Japan and Spain before rallying back to beat Costa 3-1 in their last match.

This tournament is remarkable because it is the first tournament in which all African team won at least one match in the tournament, following the footsteps of the men's team the previous year in the men's world cup.
