= South American nations at the FIFA Women's World Cup =

Association football is among the most popular sports in South America, with five members of the South American Football Confederation having competed at the sport's biggest international event, the FIFA Women's World Cup. The highest ranked result in the Women's World Cup for a South American team is 2nd place in the 2007 FIFA Women's World Cup by Brazil.

== Overview ==
	1991 (China) (12)	1995 (Sweden) (12)	1999 (United States) (16)	2003 (United States) (16)	2007 (China) (16)	2011 (Germany) (16)	2015 (Canada) (24)	2019 (France) (24)	2023 (Australia) (New Zealand) (32)	2027 (Brazil) (32)	2031 (Costa Rica) (Jamaica) (Mexico) (United States) (48)	2035 (England) (Northern Ireland) (Scotland) (Wales) (48)	Total
Teams	(Brazil)	(Brazil)	(Brazil)	(Argentina) (Brazil)	(Argentina) (Brazil)	(Brazil) (Colombia)	(Brazil) (Colombia) (Ecuador)	(Argentina) (Brazil) (Chile)	(Argentina) (Brazil) (Colombia)	(Argentina) (Brazil) (Colombia)			18
Top 16	—	—	—	—	—	—	2	1	1				4
Top 8	0	0	1	1	1	1	0	0	1				5
Top 4	0	0	1	0	1	0	0	0	0				2
Top 2	0	0	0	0	1	0	0	0	0				1
1st													0
2nd					(Brazil)								1
3rd			(Brazil)										1
4th													0

Country	#	Years	Best result
Brazil	10	1991, 1995, 1999, 2003, 2007, 2011, 2015, 2019, 2023, 2027	2nd
Argentina	5	2003, 2007, 2019, 2023, 2027	GS
Colombia	4	2011, 2015, 2023, 2027	QF
Ecuador	1	2015	GS
Chile	1	2019	GS

== Results ==
=== Most finishes in the top four ===
Team	#	Top-four finishes
Brazil	2	1999, 2007

=== Team results by tournament ===
Legend

- 1st — Champions
- 2nd — Runners-up
- 3rd — Third place
- 4th — Fourth place
- QF — Quarter-finals
- R2 — Round 2
- R1 — Round 1

- Q — Qualified for upcoming tournament
- TBD — To be determined (may still qualify for upcoming tournament)
- •• — Qualified but withdrew
- • — Did not qualify
- × — Did not enter / Withdrew / Banned
- — Hosts
- — Not affiliated in FIFA

The team ranking in each tournament is according to FIFA. The rankings, apart from the top four positions, are not a result of direct competition between the teams; instead, teams eliminated in the same round are ranked by their full results in the tournament. In recent tournaments, FIFA has used the rankings for seedings for the final tournament draw.

For each tournament, the number of teams in each finals tournament (in brackets) are shown.

Team	1991 (China) (12)	1995 (Sweden) (12)	1999 (United States) (16)	2003 (United States) (16)	2007 (China) (16)	2011 (Germany) (16)	2015 (Canada) (24)	2019 (France) (24)	2023 (Australia) (New Zealand) (32)	2027 (Brazil) (32)	2031 (Mexico) (United States) (48)	2035 (England) (Northern Ireland) (Scotland) (Wales) (48)	Total	Qual. Comp.
Argentina	×	•	•	R1; 16th	R1; 16th	•	•	R1; 18th	R1; 27th	Q	TBD	TBD	4	8
Brazil	R1; 9th	R1; 9th	3rd	QF; 5th	2nd	QF; 5th	R2; 9th	R2; 10th	R1; 18th	Q	TBD	TBD	10	10
Chile	•	•	•	•	•	•	•	R1; 17th	•	•	TBD	TBD	1	9
Colombia	×	×	•	•	•	R1; 14th	R2; 12th	•	QF; 7th	Q	TBD	TBD	3	7
Ecuador	×	•	•	•	•	•	R1; 24th	•	•	TBD	TBD	TBD	1	8

=== Tournament standings ===
Team	Champions	Finals	Semi-finals	Quarter-finals	Second round
Brazil	0	1	1	2	2
Colombia	0	0	0	1	0

== Appearances ==
=== Ranking of teams by number of appearances ===
Team	Appearances	Record streak	Active streak	Debut	Most recent	Best result (* = hosts)
Brazil	10	10	10	1991	2027	Runners-up (2007)
Argentina	4	2	2	2003	2023	Group stage (2003, 2007, 2019, 2023)
Colombia	3	2	1	2011	2023	Quarter-finals (2023)
Ecuador	1	1	0	2015	2015	Group stage (2015)
Chile	1	1	0	2019	2019	Group stage (2019)

=== Team debuts ===
Year	Debutants	Total
1991	Brazil	1
2003	Argentina	1
2011	Colombia	1
2015	Ecuador	1
2019	Chile	1
Total		5

== Summary of performance ==
This table shows the number of countries represented at the Women's World Cup, the number of entries (#E) from around the world including any rejections and withdrawals, the number of South American entries (#A), how many of those South American entries withdrawn (#A-) before/during qualification or were rejected by FIFA, the South American representatives at the Women's World Cup finals, the number of World Cup Qualifiers each South American representative had to play to get to the World Cup (#WCQ), the furthest stage reached, results, and coaches.

Year	Host	Size	#E	#A	#A-	South American finalists	#WCQ	Stage	Results	Coach
1991	China	12	48	3	0	Brazil	2	Group stage	won 1–0 Japan, lost 0–5 United States, lost 0–2 Sweden	(Brazil) Fernando Pires
1995	Sweden	12	55	5	0	Brazil	5	Group stage	won 1–0 Sweden, lost 1–2 Japan, lost 1–6 Germany	(Brazil) Ademar Fonseca
1999	United States	16	67	10	0	Brazil	6	Third place	won 7–1 Mexico, won 2–0 Italy, drew 3–3 Germany, won 4–3 Nigeria (g.g.), lost 0–2 United States, drew 0–0 Norway (won 5–4 (p))	(Brazil) Wilsinho
2003	United States	16	99	10	0	Argentina	5	Group stage	lost 0–6 Japan, lost 0–3 Canada, lost 1–6 Germany	(Argentina) Carlos Borrello
2003	United States	16	99	10	0	Brazil	3	Quarter-finals	won 3–0 South Korea, won 4–1 Norway, drew 1–1 France, lost 1–2 Sweden	(Brazil) Paulo Gonçalves
2007	China	16	120	10	0	Argentina	7	Group stage	lost 0–11 Germany, lost 0–1 Japan, lost 1–6 England	(Argentina) Carlos Borrello
2007	China	16	120	10	0	Brazil	7	Runners-up	won 5–0 New Zealand, won 4–0 China, won 1–0 Denmark, won 3–2 Australia, won 4–0 United States, lost 0–2 Germany	(Brazil) Jorge Barcellos
2011	Germany	16	125	10	0	Brazil	7	Quarter-finals	won 1–0 Australia, won 3–0 Norway, won 3–0 Equatorial Guinea, drew 2–2 United States (lost 3–5 (p))	(Brazil) Kleiton Lima
2011	Germany	16	125	10	0	Colombia	7	Group stage	lost 0–1 Sweden, lost 0–3 United States, drew 0–0 North Korea	(Colombia) Ricardo Rozo
2015	Canada	24	134	10	0	Brazil	7	Round of 16	won 2–0 South Korea, won 1–0 Spain, won 1–0 Costa Rica, lost 0–1 Australia	(Brazil) Vadão
2015	Canada	24	134	10	0	Colombia	7	Round of 16	drew 1–1 Mexico, won 2–0 France, lost 1–2 England, lost 0–2 United States	(Colombia) Fabián Taborda
2015	Canada	24	134	10	0	Ecuador	9	Group stage	lost 0–6 Cameroon, lost 1–10 Switzerland, lost 0–1 Japan	(Ecuador) Vanessa Arauz
2019	France	24	144	10	0	Argentina	9	Group stage	drew 0–0 Japan, lost 0–1 England, drew 3–3 Scotland	(Argentina) Carlos Borrello
2019	France	24	144	10	0	Brazil	7	Round of 16	won 3–0 Jamaica, lost 2–3 Australia, won 1–0 Italy, lost 1–2 France (a.e.t.)	(Brazil) Vadão
2019	France	24	144	10	0	Chile	7	Group stage	lost 0–2 Sweden, lost 0–3 United States, won 2–0 Thailand	(Chile) José Letelier
2023	Australia; New Zealand	32	172	10	0	Argentina	6	Group stage	lost 0–1 Italy, drew 2–2 South Africa, lost 0–2 Sweden	(Argentina) Germán Portanova
2023	Australia; New Zealand	32	172	10	0	Brazil	6	Group stage	won 4–0 Panama, lost 1–2 France, drew 0–0 Jamaica	(Sweden) Pia Sundhage
2023	Australia; New Zealand	32	172	10	0	Colombia	6	Quarter-finals	won 2–0 South Korea, won 2–1 Germany, lost 0–1 Morocco, won 1–0 Jamaica, lost 1–2 England	(Colombia) Nelson Abadía

== Not yet qualified ==
5 of the 10 active FIFA and CONMEBOL members have never appeared in the final tournament.

Legend

- TBD — To be determined (may still qualify for upcoming tournament)
- • — Did not qualify
- × — Did not enter / Withdrew / Banned
- — Not affiliated in FIFA
- •• — Qualified, but withdrew before Finals

Country	Number of Qualifying attempts	1991 (China)	1995 (Sweden)	1999 (United States)	2003 (United States)	2007 (China)	2011 (Germany)	2015 (Canada)	2019 (France)	2023 (Australia) (New Zealand)	2027 (Brazil)	2031 (Mexico) (United States)	2035 (England) (Northern Ireland) (Scotland) (Wales)
Bolivia	8	×	•	•	•	•	•	•	•	•	•	TBD	TBD
Paraguay	7	×	×	•	•	•	•	•	•	•	•	TBD	TBD
Peru	7	×	×	•	•	•	•	•	•	•	•	TBD	TBD
Uruguay	7	×	×	•	•	•	•	•	•	•	•	TBD	TBD
Venezuela	8	•	×	•	•	•	•	•	•	•	TBD	TBD	TBD
