= North, Central American and Caribbean nations at the FIFA Women's World Cup =

Association football is among the most popular sports in North America, Central America and Caribbean, with seven members of the Confederation of North, Central America and Caribbean Association Football having competed at the sport's biggest international event, the FIFA Women's World Cup. The highest ranked result in the Women's World Cup for a North, Central American and Caribbean team is 1st place in the 1991, 2011, 2015 and 2019 FIFA Women's World Cups by United States.

== Overview ==
	1991 (China) (12)	1995 (Sweden) (12)	1999 (United States) (16)	2003 (United States) (16)	2007 (China) (16)	2011 (Germany) (16)	2015 (Canada) (24)	2019 (France) (24)	2023 (Australia) (New Zealand) (32)	2027 (Brazil) (32)	2031 (Costa Rica) (Jamaica) (Mexico) (United States) (48)	2035 (England) (Northern Ireland) (Scotland) (Scotland) (Wales) (48)	Total
Teams	(United States)	(Canada) (United States)	(Canada) (Mexico) (United States)	(Canada) (United States)	(Canada) (United States)	(Canada) (Mexico) (United States)	(Canada) (Costa Rica) (Mexico) (United States)	(Canada) (Jamaica) (United States)	(Canada) (Costa Rica) (Haiti) (Jamaica) (Panama) (United States)		(Costa Rica) (Jamaica) (Mexico) (United States)		30
Top 16	—	—	—	—	—	—	2	2	2				6
Top 8	1	1	1	2	1	1	2	1	0				10
Top 4	1	1	1	2	1	1	1	1	0				9
Top 2	1	0	1	0	0	1	1	1	0				5
1st	(United States)		(United States)				(United States)	(United States)					4
2nd						(United States)							1
3rd		(United States)		(United States)	(United States)								3
4th				(Canada)									1

Country	#	Years	Best result
United States	10	1991, 1995, 1999, 2003, 2007, 2011, 2015, 2019, 2023, 2031	1st
Canada	8	1995, 1999, 2003, 2007, 2011, 2015, 2019, 2023	4th
Mexico	4	1999, 2011, 2015, 2031	GS
Costa Rica	3	2015, 2023 2031	GS
Jamaica	2	2019, 2023, 2031	R2
Haiti	1	2023	GS
Panama	1	2023	GS

== Results ==
=== Most finishes in the top four ===
Team	#	Top-four finishes
United States	8	1991, 1995, 1999, 2003, 2007, 2011, 2015, 2019
Canada	1	2003

=== Team results by tournament ===
Legend

- 1st — Champions
- 2nd — Runners-up
- 3rd — Third place
- 4th — Fourth place
- QF — Quarter-finals
- R2 — Round 2
- R1 — Round 1
- Q — Qualified for upcoming tournament
- TBD — To be determined (may still qualify for upcoming tournament)
- •• — Qualified but withdrew
- • — Did not qualify
- × — Did not enter / Withdrew / Banned
- — Hosts
- — Not affiliated in FIFA

The team ranking in each tournament is according to FIFA. The rankings, apart from the top four positions, are not a result of direct competition between the teams; instead, teams eliminated in the same round are ranked by their full results in the tournament. In recent tournaments, FIFA has used the rankings for seedings for the final tournament draw.

For each tournament, the number of teams in each finals tournament (in brackets) are shown.

Team	1991 (China) (12)	1995 (Sweden) (12)	1999 (United States) (16)	2003 (United States) (16)	2007 (China) (16)	2011 (Germany) (16)	2015 (Canada) (24)	2019 (France) (24)	2023 (Australia) (New Zealand) (32)	2027 (Brazil) (32)	2031 (Costa Rica) (Jamaica) (Mexico) (United States) (48)	2035 (England) (Northern Ireland) (Scotland) (Wales) (48)	Total	Qual. Comp.
Canada	•	R1; 10th	R1; 12th	4th	R1; 9th	R1; 16th	QF; 6th	R2; 11th	R1; 21st	TBD	TBD	TBD	11	9
Costa Rica	•	×	•	•	•	•	R1; 18th	•	R1; 30th	TBD	Q	TBD	3	11
Haiti	•	×	•	•	•	•	•	•	R1; 29th	TBD	TBD	TBD	1	11
Jamaica	•	•	×	•	•	×	•	R1; 23rd	R2; 13th	TBD	Q	TBD	3	10
Mexico	•	•	R1; 16th	•	•	R1; 11th	R1; 22nd	•	•	TBD	Q	TBD	3	12
Panama	×	×	×	•	•	×	•	•	R1; 31st	TBD	TBD	TBD	1	8
United States	1st	3rd	1st	3rd	3rd	2nd	1st	1st	R2; 9th	TBD	Q	TBD	9	12

=== Tournament standings ===
Team	Champions	Finals	Semi-finals	Quarter-finals	Second round
United States	4	1	3	0	1
Canada	0	0	1	1	1
Jamaica	0	0	0	0	1

== Appearances ==
=== Ranking of teams by number of appearances ===
Team	Appearances	Record streak	Active streak	Debut	Most recent	Best result (* = hosts)
United States	10	10	10	1991	2031	Champions (1991, 1999, 2015, 2019)
Canada	8	8	8	1995	2023	Fourth place (2003)
Mexico	4	3	1	1999	2031	Group stage (1999, 2011, 2015)
Jamaica	3	3	3	2019	2031	Round of 16 (2023)
Costa Rica	3	2	2	2015	2031	Group stage (2015, 2023)
Haiti	1	1	1	2023	2023	Group stage (2023)
Panama	1	1	1	2023	2023	Group stage (2023)

=== Team debuts ===
Year	Debutants	Total
1991	United States	1
1995	Canada	1
1999	Mexico	1
2015	Costa Rica	1
2019	Jamaica	1
2023	Haiti, Panama	2
Total		7

== Summary of performance ==
This table shows the number of countries represented at the Women's World Cup, the number of entries (#E) from around the world including any rejections and withdrawals, the number of North, Central American and Caribbean entries (#A), how many of those North, Central American and Caribbean entries withdrawn (#A-) before/during qualification or were rejected by FIFA, the North, Central American and Caribbean representatives at the Women's World Cup finals, the number of World Cup Qualifiers each North, Central American and Caribbean representative had to play to get to the World Cup (#WCQ), the furthest stage reached, results, and coaches.

Year	Host	Size	#E	#A	#A-	North, Central American and Caribbean finalists	#WCQ	Stage	Results	Coach
1991	China	12	48	8	0	United States	5	Champions	won 3–2 Sweden, won 5–0 Brazil, won 3–0 Japan, won 7–0 Chinese Taipei, won 5–2 Germany, won 2–1 Norway	(United States) Anson Dorrance
1995	Sweden	12	55	5	0	Canada	4	Group stage	lost 2–3 England, drew 3–3 Nigeria, lost 0–7 Norway	(Canada) Sylvie Béliveau
1995	Sweden	12	55	5	0	United States	4	Third place	drew 3–3 China, won 2–0 Denmark, won 4–1 Australia, won 4–0 Japan, lost 0–1 Norway, won 2–0 China	(United States) Tony DiCicco
1999	United States	16	67	11	1	Canada	5	Group stage	drew 1–1 Japan, lost 1–7 Norway, 1–4 Russia	(Canada) Neil Turnbull
1999	United States	16	67	11	1	Mexico	7	Group stage	lost 1–7 Brazil, lost 0–6 Germany, lost 0–2 Italy	(Mexico) Leonardo Cuéllar
1999	United States	16	67	11	1	United States	Hosts	Champions	won 3–0 Denmark, won 7–1 Nigeria, won 3–0 North Korea, won 3–2 Germany, won 2–0 Brazil, drew 0–0 China (won 5–4 (p))	(United States) Tony DiCicco
2003	United States	16	99	18	4	Canada	5	Fourth place	lost 1–4 Germany, won 3–0 Argentina, won 3–1 Japan, won 1–0 China, lost 1–2 Sweden, lost 1–3 United States	(Norway) Even Pellerud
2003	United States	16	99	18	4	United States	5	Third place	won 3–1 Sweden, won 5–0 Nigeria, won 3–0 North Korea, won 1–0 Norway, lost 0–3 Germany, won 3–1 Canada	(United States) April Heinrichs
2007	China	16	120	27	5	Canada	2	Group stage	lost 1–2 Norway, won 4–0 Ghana, drew 2–2 Australia	(Norway) Even Pellerud
2007	China	16	120	27	5	United States	2	Third place	drew 2–2 North Korea, won 2–0 Sweden, won 1–0 Nigeria, won 3–0 England, lost 0–4 Brazil, won 4–1 Norway	(United States) Greg Ryan
2011	Germany	16	125	26	0	Canada	5	Group stage	lost 1–2 Germany, lost 0–4 France, lost 0–1 Nigeria	(Italy) Carolina Morace
2011	Germany	16	125	26	0	Mexico	5	Group stage	drew 1–1 England, lost 0–4 Japan, drew 2–2 New Zealand	(Mexico) Leonardo Cuéllar
2011	Germany	16	125	26	0	United States	7	Runners-up	won 2–0 North Korea, won 3–0 Colombia, lost 1–2 Sweden, drew 2–2 Brazil (won 5–3 (p)), won 3–1 France, drew 2–2 Japan (lost 1–3 (p))	(Sweden) Pia Sundhage
2015	Canada	24	134	26	2	Canada	Hosts	Quarter-finals	won 1–0 China, drew 0–0 New Zealand, drew 1–1 Netherlands, won 1–0 Switzerland, lost 1–2 England	(England) John Herdman
2015	Canada	24	134	26	2	Costa Rica	7	Group stage	drew 1–1 Spain, drew 2–2 South Korea, lost 1–0 Brazil	(Costa Rica) Amelia Valverde
2015	Canada	24	134	26	2	Mexico	5	Group stage	drew 1–1 Colombia, lost 1–2 England, lost 0–5 France	(Mexico) Leonardo Cuéllar
2015	Canada	24	134	26	2	United States	5	Champions	won 3–1 Australia, drew 0–0 Sweden, won 1–0 Nigeria, won 2–0 Colombia, won 1–0 China, won 2–0 Germany, won 5–2 Japan	(England) Jill Ellis
2019	France	24	144	27	1	Canada	5	Round of 16	won 1–0 Cameroon, won 2–0 New Zealand, lost 1–2 Netherlands, lost 0–1 Sweden	(Denmark) Kenneth Heiner-Møller
2019	France	24	144	27	1	Jamaica	12	Group stage	lost 0–3 Brazil, lost 0–5 Italy, lost 1–4 Australia	(England) Hue Menzies
2019	France	24	144	27	1	United States	5	Champions	won 13–0 Thailand, won 3–0 Chile, won 2–0 Sweden, won 2–1 Spain, won 2–1 France, won 2–1 England, won 2–0 Netherlands	(England) Jill Ellis
2023	Australia; New Zealand	32	172	32	0	Canada	3	Group stage	drew 0–0 Nigeria, won 2–1 Republic of Ireland, lost 0–4 Australia	(England) Bev Priestman
2023	Australia; New Zealand	32	172	32	0	Costa Rica	7	Group stage	lost 0–3 Spain, lost 0–2 Japan, lost 1–3 Zambia	(Costa Rica) Amelia Valverde
2023	Australia; New Zealand	32	172	32	0	Haiti	9	Group stage	lost 0–1 England, lost 0–1 China, lost 0–2 Denmark	(France) Nicolas Delépine
2023	Australia; New Zealand	32	172	32	0	Jamaica	7	Round of 16	drew 0–0 France, won 1–0 Panama, drew 0–0 Brazil, lost 0–1 Colombia	(Jamaica) Lorne Donaldson
2023	Australia; New Zealand	32	172	32	0	Panama	9	Group stage	lost 0–4 Brazil, lost 0–1 Jamaica, lost 3–6 France	(Mexico) Ignacio Quintana
2023	Australia; New Zealand	32	172	32	0	United States	3	Round of 16	won 3–0 Vietnam, drew 1–1 Netherlands, drew 0–0 Portugal, drew 0–0 Sweden (lost 4–5 (p))	(North Macedonia) Vlatko Andonovski

== Not yet qualified ==
28 of the 35 active FIFA and CONCACAF members have never appeared in the final tournament.

Legend

- TBD — To be determined (may still qualify for upcoming tournament)
- • — Did not qualify
- × — Did not enter / Withdrew / Banned
- — Not affiliated in FIFA
- •• — Qualified, but withdrew before Finals

Country	Number of Qualifying attempts	1991 (China)	1995 (Sweden)	1999 (United States)	2003 (United States)	2007 (China)	2011 (Germany)	2015 (Canada)	2019 (France)	2023 (Australia) (New Zealand)	2027 (Brazil)	2031 (Costa Rica) (Jamaica) (Mexico) (United States)	2035 (England) (Northern Ireland) (Scotland) (Wales)
Anguilla	3			×	×	×	•	×	•	•	TBD	TBD	TBD
Antigua and Barbuda	5	×	×	×	×	•	•	•	•	•	TBD	TBD	TBD
Aruba	4	×	×	×	×	•	×	•	•	•	TBD	TBD	TBD
Bahamas	1	×	×	×	•	×	×	×	×	×	TBD	TBD	TBD
Barbados	5	×	×	×	×	•	•	•	•	•	TBD	TBD	TBD
Belize	3	×	×	×	×	×	•	•	×	•	TBD	TBD	TBD
Bermuda	4	×	×	×	×	•	×	•	•	•	TBD	TBD	TBD
British Virgin Islands	2			×	×	•	×	×	×	•	TBD	TBD	TBD
Cayman Islands	3		×	×	×	•	×	•	×	•	TBD	TBD	TBD
Cuba	4	×	×	×	×	×	•	•	•	•	TBD	TBD	TBD
Curaçao	3	×	×	×	×	•	×	×	•	•	TBD	TBD	TBD
Dominica	5		×	×	•	•	•	×	•	•	TBD	TBD	TBD
Dominican Republic	6	×	×	×	•	•	•	•	•	•	TBD	TBD	TBD
El Salvador	7	×	×	•	•	•	•	•	•	•	TBD	TBD	TBD
Grenada	4	×	×	×	×	•	•	×	•	•	TBD	TBD	TBD
Guatemala	6	×	×	•	•	•	•	•	×	•	TBD	TBD	TBD
Guyana	4	×	×	•	×	×	•	×	•	•	TBD	TBD	TBD
Honduras	5	×	×	•	•	×	•	•	×	•	TBD	TBD	TBD
Montserrat	0			×	×	×	×	×	×	×	TBD	TBD	TBD
Nicaragua	5	×	×	×	×	•	•	•	•	•	TBD	TBD	TBD
Puerto Rico	6	×	×	•	•	×	•	•	•	•	TBD	TBD	TBD
Saint Kitts and Nevis	5		×	×	×	•	•	•	•	•	TBD	TBD	TBD
Saint Lucia	5	×	×	×	•	•	•	•	•	×	TBD	TBD	TBD
Saint Vincent and the Grenadines	5	×	×	×	×	•	•	•	•	•	TBD	TBD	TBD
Suriname	6	×	×	×	•	•	•	•	•	•	TBD	TBD	TBD
Trinidad and Tobago	9	•	•	•	•	•	•	•	•	•	TBD	TBD	TBD
Turks and Caicos Islands	4				×	•	•	•	×	•	TBD	TBD	TBD
U.S. Virgin Islands	6				•	•	•	•	•	•	TBD	TBD	TBD
