= Oceanian nations at the FIFA Women's World Cup =

Association football is among the most popular sports in Oceania, with two members of the Oceania Football Confederation having competed at the sport's biggest international event, the FIFA Women's World Cup.

== Overview ==
	1991 (China) (12)	1995 (Sweden) (12)	1999 (United States) (16)	2003 (United States) (16)	2007 (China) (16)	2011 (Germany) (16)	2015 (Canada) (24)	2019 (France) (24)	2023 (Australia) (New Zealand) (32)	2027 (Brazil) (32)	2031 (Costa Rica) (Jamaica) (Mexico) (United States) (48)	2035 (England) (Northern Ireland) (Scotland) (Wales) (48)	Total
Teams	(New Zealand)	(Australia)	(Australia)	(Australia)	(New Zealand)	(New Zealand)	(New Zealand)	(New Zealand)	(New Zealand)				9
Top 16	—	—	—	—	—	—	0	0	0				0
Top 8	0	0	0	0	0	0	0	0	0				0
Top 4	0	0	0	0	0	0	0	0	0				0
Top 2	0	0	0	0	0	0	0	0	0				0
1st													0
2nd													0
3rd													0
4th													0

Country	#	Years	Best result
Australia	8	1995, 1999, 2003, (2007, 2011, 2015, 2019, 2023)	4th
New Zealand	6	1991, 2007, 2011, 2015, 2019, 2023	GS

== Results ==
=== Team results by tournament ===
Legend

- 1st — Champions
- 2nd — Runners-up
- 3rd — Third place
- 4th — Fourth place
- QF — Quarter-finals
- R2 — Round 2
- R1 — Round 1

- Q — Qualified for upcoming tournament
- TBD — To be determined (may still qualify for upcoming tournament)
- •• — Qualified but withdrew
- • — Did not qualify
- × — Did not enter / Withdrew / Banned
- — Hosts
- — Not affiliated in FIFA

The team ranking in each tournament is according to FIFA. The rankings, apart from the top four positions, are not a result of direct competition between the teams; instead, teams eliminated in the same round are ranked by their full results in the tournament. In recent tournaments, FIFA has used the rankings for seedings for the final tournament draw.

For each tournament, the number of teams in each finals tournament (in brackets) are shown.

Team	1991 (China) (12)	1995 (Sweden) (12)	1999 (United States) (16)	2003 (United States) (16)	2007 (China) (16)	2011 (Germany) (16)	2015 (Canada) (24)	2019 (France) (24)	2023 (Australia) (New Zealand) (32)	2027 (Brazil) (32)	2031 (Mexico) (United States) (48)	2035 (England) (Northern Ireland) (Scotland) (Wales) (48)	Total	Qual. Comp.
Australia	•	R1; 12th	R1; 11th	R1; 13th	QF; 6th	QF; 8th	QF; 7th	R2; 9th	4th	Q	TBD	TBD	8	12
Australia	•	R1; 12th	R1; 11th	R1; 13th	Member of AFC								8	12
New Zealand	R1; 11th	•	•	•	R1; 14th	R1; 12th	R1; 19th	R1; 20th	R1; 20th	Q	TBD	TBD	6	12

== Appearances ==
=== Ranking of teams by number of appearances ===
Team	Appearances	Record streak	Active streak	Debut	Most recent	Best result (* = hosts)
New Zealand	6	5	5	1991	2023	Group stage (1991, 2007, 2011, 2015, 2019, 2023)
Australia	3	3	0	1995	2023	Group stage (1995, 1999, 2003)

=== Team debuts ===
Year	Debutants	Total
1991	New Zealand	1
1995	Australia	1
Total		2

== Summary of performance ==
This table shows the number of countries represented at the Women's World Cup, the number of entries (#E) from around the world including any rejections and withdrawals, the number of Oceanian entries (#A), how many of those Oceanian entries withdrawn (#A-) before/during qualification or were rejected by FIFA, the Oceanian representatives at the Women's World Cup finals, the number of World Cup Qualifiers each Oceanian representative had to play to get to the World Cup (#WCQ), the furthest stage reached, results, and coaches.

Year	Host	Size	#E	#A	#A-	Oceanian finalists	#WCQ	Stage	Results	Coach
1991	China	12	48	3	0	New Zealand	4	Group stage	lost 0–3 Denmark, lost 0–4 Norway, lost 1–4 China	(New Zealand) Dave Boardman
1995	Sweden	12	55	3	0	Australia	4	Group stage	lost 0–5 Denmark, lost 2–4 China, lost 1–4 United States	(Scotland) Tom Sermanni
1999	United States	16	67	6	0	Australia	4	Group stage	drew 1–1 Ghana, lost 1–3 Sweden, lost 1–3 China	(Australia) Greg Brown
2003	United States	16	99	5	5	Australia	4	Group stage	lost 1–2 Russia, drew 1–1 China, lost 1–2 Ghana	(Australia) Adrian Santrac
2007	China	16	120	4	6	New Zealand	3	Group stage	lost 0–5 Brazil, lost 0–2 Denmark, lost 0–2 China	(England) John Herdman
2011	Germany	16	125	8	0	New Zealand	5	Group stage	lost 1–2 Japan, lost 1–2 England, drew 2–2 Mexico	(England) John Herdman
2015	Canada	24	134	4	0	New Zealand	3	Group stage	lost 0–1 Netherlands, drew 0–0 Canada, drew 2–2 China	(England) Tony Readings
2019	France	24	144	11	0	New Zealand	5	Group stage	lost 0–1 Netherlands, lost 0–2 Canada, lost 1–2 Cameroon	(Scotland) Tom Sermanni
2023	Australia; New Zealand	32	172	9	1	New Zealand	Hosts	Group stage	won 1–0 Norway, lost 0–1 Philippines, drew 0–0 Switzerland	(Czech Republic) Jitka Klimková

== Not yet qualified ==
10 of the 11 active FIFA and OFC members have never appeared in the final tournament.

Legend

- TBD — To be determined (may still qualify for upcoming tournament)
- • — Did not qualify
- × — Did not enter / Withdrew / Banned
- — Not affiliated in FIFA
- •• — Qualified, but withdrew before Finals

Country	Number of Qualifying attempts	1991 (China)	1995 (Sweden)	1999 (United States)	2003 (United States)	2007 (China)	2011 (Germany)	2015 (Canada)	2019 (France)	2023 (Australia) (New Zealand)	2027 (Brazil)	2031 (Mexico) (Northern Ireland) (Scotland) (Wales)	2035 (United States)
American Samoa	2	×	×	•	×	×	×	×	•	×	TBD	TBD	TBD
Cook Islands	5	×	×	×	•	×	•	•	•	•	TBD	TBD	TBD
Fiji	4	×	×	•	×	×	•	×	•	•	TBD	TBD	TBD
New Caledonia	2	×	×	×	×	×	×	×	•	•	TBD	TBD	TBD
Papua New Guinea	9	•	•	•	•	•	•	•	•	•	TBD	TBD	TBD
Samoa	4	×	×	•	•	×	×	×	•	•	TBD	TBD	TBD
Solomon Islands	4	×	×	×	×	•	•	×	•	•	TBD	TBD	TBD
Tahiti	3	×	×	×	×	×	•	×	•	•	TBD	TBD	TBD
Tonga	5	×	×	×	×	•	•	•	•	•	TBD	TBD	TBD
Vanuatu	3	×	×	×	×	×	•	×	•	•	TBD	TBD	TBD
