= 1999 FIFA Women's World Cup qualification (CONCACAF–CONMEBOL play-off) =

- Event: 1999 FIFA Women's World Cup qualification
Mexico	Argentina
(Mexico)	(Argentina)
6	3
- on aggregate

First leg
Mexico	Argentina
3	1
- Date: 14 December 1998
- Venue: Estadio Nemesio Díez, Toluca
- Attendance: 3,000

Second leg
Argentina	Mexico
2	3
- Date: 19 December 1998
- Venue: José Amalfitani Stadium, Buenos Aires

The CONCACAF–CONMEBOL play-off of the 1999 FIFA Women's World Cup qualification competition was a two-legged home-and-away tie that decided one spot in the final tournament in the United States. The play-off was contested by the runners-up from CONCACAF, Mexico, and the runners-up from CONMEBOL, Argentina.

== Qualified teams ==
Confederation	Placement	Team
CONCACAF	1998 CONCACAF Women's Championship 2nd place	Mexico
CONMEBOL	1998 South American Women's Football Championship 2nd place	Argentina

== Summary ==
Team 1	Agg.	Team 2	1st leg	2nd leg
Mexico	6–3	Argentina	3–1	3–2

== Matches ==
14 December 1998
16:00 UTC−6

Mexico	3–1	Argentina
Gerardo 23'; Domínguez 31'; Mora 66'	Report	? 1'

Estadio Nemesio Díez, Toluca
Attendance: 3,000
19 December 1998

Argentina	2–3	Mexico
Gaitán 30' (pen.); Peralta 38'	Report	Domínguez 28'; Gerardo 50'; López 80'

José Amalfitani Stadium, Buenos Aires

Mexico won 6–3 on aggregate and qualified for the 1999 FIFA Women's World Cup.

== Goalscorers ==
There were 9 goals scored in 2 matches, for an average of 4.5 goals per match.

2 goals

- (Mexico) Maribel Domínguez
- (Mexico) Monica Gerardo

1 goal

- (Argentina) Yanina Gaitán
- (Argentina) Malvina Peralta
- (Argentina) Unknown
- (Mexico) Evelyn López
- (Mexico) Iris Mora
