= Mónica Gerardo =

Mexican footballer (born 1976)

Personal information
- Full name: Mónica Marie Gerardo Morán
- Date of birth: 10 November 1976 (age 49)
- Place of birth: Saint Paul, Minnesota, U.S.
- Height: 1.70 m (5 ft 7 in)
- Positions: Midfielder; forward

College career
Years	Team	Apps	(Gls)
1995–1998	Notre Dame Fighting Irish	98	(73)

Senior career*
Years	Team	Apps	(Gls)
2000	Ajax America		
2001–2003	Washington Freedom	42	(5)

International career^{‡}
1993–1995	United States U-20		
1998–2002	Mexico	30	(15)

Managerial career
- 2002: Navy Midshipmen (volunteer asst.)
- 2003–2005: Pittsburgh Panthers (asst.)
- 2006–2008: Saint Mary's Gaels (asst.)
- 2011–2018: Whittier Poets
- * Club domestic league appearances and goals as of 14:37, 30 April 2016 (UTC) ‡ National team caps and goals as of 14:37, 30 April 2016 (UTC)

Mónica Marie Gerardo Morán (born 10 November 1976) is a football manager and former professional player who played as a midfielder and a forward. Born in the United States, she had been capped by the Mexico women's national team, appearing at the 1999 FIFA Women's World Cup. At club level, she has played in the Women's United Soccer Association (WUSA) for the Washington Freedom.

== Playing career ==
=== College ===
Gerardo played with Notre Dame Fighting Irish from 1995 until 1998. As a freshman Gerardo contributed to the team's 1995 NCAA Division I Women's Soccer Tournament win. She left as the program's all-time leader in goals and points, with 73 and 109, respectively.

=== Club ===
In 2000 Gerardo played for Women's Premier Soccer League (WPSL) team Ajax. She was drafted by Washington Freedom ahead of the inaugural 2001 season of the Women's United Soccer Association (WUSA). In the Freedom's first year, Gerardo scored two goals in 19 appearances (nine starts) as the team slumped to a joint-last placed finish. In 2002 the Freedom performed better. Gerardo posted three goals, starting 10 of her 19 appearances as the team finished the regular season in third place. She also scored a late game-winning goal in the play-off semi-final win over Philadelphia Charge, which qualified the team for Founders Cup II, where they were beaten 3–2 by Carolina Courage.

Early in the 2003 season Gerardo announced her sudden retirement from professional soccer, to accept a coaching position with the Pittsburgh Panthers.

=== International ===
A promising forward for the Notre Dame Fighting Irish in college soccer, Gerardo was one of several Californian-born players with Mexican eligibility to be called up by Mexico's coach Leonardo Cuéllar. After scoring five goals in qualifying, she played in all three games for Mexico at the 1999 FIFA Women's World Cup; defeats by Brazil, Germany and Italy. Gerardo totaled 15 goals in her 30 caps with Mexico.

== After Futbol ==
Monica Gerardo is now the principal for St. Marks Lutheran School in Hacienda Heights, California and has held that position since 2019.

== Personal life ==
Born in the United States, Gerardo is of Mexican and Spanish descent through her father and mother, respectively.

== See also ==
- List of Mexico women's international footballers
