= 2011 FIFA Women's World Cup qualification (UEFA–CONCACAF play-off) =

- Event: 2011 FIFA Women's World Cup qualification
Italy	United States
(Italy)	(United States)
0	2
- on aggregate

First leg
Italy	United States
0	1
- Date: 20 November 2010
- Venue: Stadio Euganeo, Padua
- Referee: Silvia Reyes (Peru)
- Attendance: 5,000

Second leg
United States	Italy
1	0
- Date: 27 November 2010
- Venue: Toyota Park, Bridgeview
- Referee: Cha Sung-mi (South Korea)
- Attendance: 9,508

In the 2011 FIFA Women's World Cup qualification process, one spot was allocated to the winner of a two-legged play-off between the winner of the UEFA repechage play-offs and the winner of the third-place qualification match in the 2010 CONCACAF Women's Gold Cup.

== Qualified teams ==
From UEFA, Italy qualified by defeating Ukraine and Switzerland in repechage play-offs. Italy had been defeated by France in the direct qualification stage in UEFA.

From CONCACAF, the United States qualified by defeating Costa Rica in the third-place play-off. The U.S. had been defeated by Mexico in the semi-finals, their first ever loss in the Women's Gold Cup and their first loss ever to Mexico.

Confederation	Placement	Team
UEFA	Play-off repechage II winners	Italy
CONCACAF	2010 CONCACAF Women's World Cup Qualifying 3rd place	United States

== Summary ==
The draw for the order of legs was held at the FIFA headquarters in Zürich, Switzerland on 17 March 2010. The matches were played on 20 and 27 November 2010.

Team 1	Agg.	Team 2	1st leg	2nd leg
Italy	0–2	United States	0–1	0–1

== Matches ==
20 November 2010
16:30 UTC+1

Italy	0–1	United States
	Report	Morgan 90+4'

Stadio Euganeo, Padua
Attendance: 5,000
Referee: Silvia Reyes (Peru)
27 November 2010
13:00 UTC−6

United States	1–0	Italy
Rodriguez 40'	Report

Toyota Park, Bridgeview
Attendance: 9,508
Referee: Cha Sung-mi (South Korea)

United States won 2–0 on aggregate and qualified for the 2011 FIFA Women's World Cup.

== Goalscorers ==
There were 2 goals scored in 2 matches, for an average of 1 goal per match.

1 goal

- (United States) Alex Morgan
- (United States) Amy Rodriguez
