= 1991 FIFA Women's World Cup qualification =

1991 FIFA Women's World Cup Qualification
Tournament details
- Dates: 9 September 1989 - 14 July 1991
- Teams: 48 (from 6 confederations)

Tournament statistics
- Matches played: 111
- Goals scored: 445 (4.01 per match)

The 1991 FIFA Women's World Cup qualification process saw 48 teams from the six FIFA confederations compete for the 12 places in the 1991 FIFA Women's World Cup finals. The places were divided as follows:

- Africa - represented by CAF: 1 berth
- Asia - AFC: 3 (one of those was eventual host China, who did not qualify automatically)
- Europe - UEFA: 5
- North, Central America & the Caribbean - CONCACAF: 1
- Oceania - OFC: 1
- South America - CONMEBOL: 1

All of the confederations used their regional championship tournament to determine qualification. Hosts China PR also entered the qualifying process.

The qualification process spanned nearly two years, beginning with the first match on 9 September 1989 and the qualification concluded on 14 July 1991. A total of 445 goals were scored in the 111 qualifying matches (an average of 4.01 per match).

Four teams withdrew during the qualification without playing a match: Congo, Senegal, Zambia, and Zimbabwe, all of which are African teams.

== Qualified teams ==
- Africa (CAF)
  - Nigeria
- Asia (AFC)
  - China
  - Chinese Taipei
  - Japan
- South America (CONMEBOL)
  - Brazil
- Oceania (OFC)
  - New Zealand
- Europe (UEFA)
  - Denmark
  - Germany
  - Italy
  - Norway
  - Sweden
- North America, Central America & Caribbean (CONCACAF)
  - United States

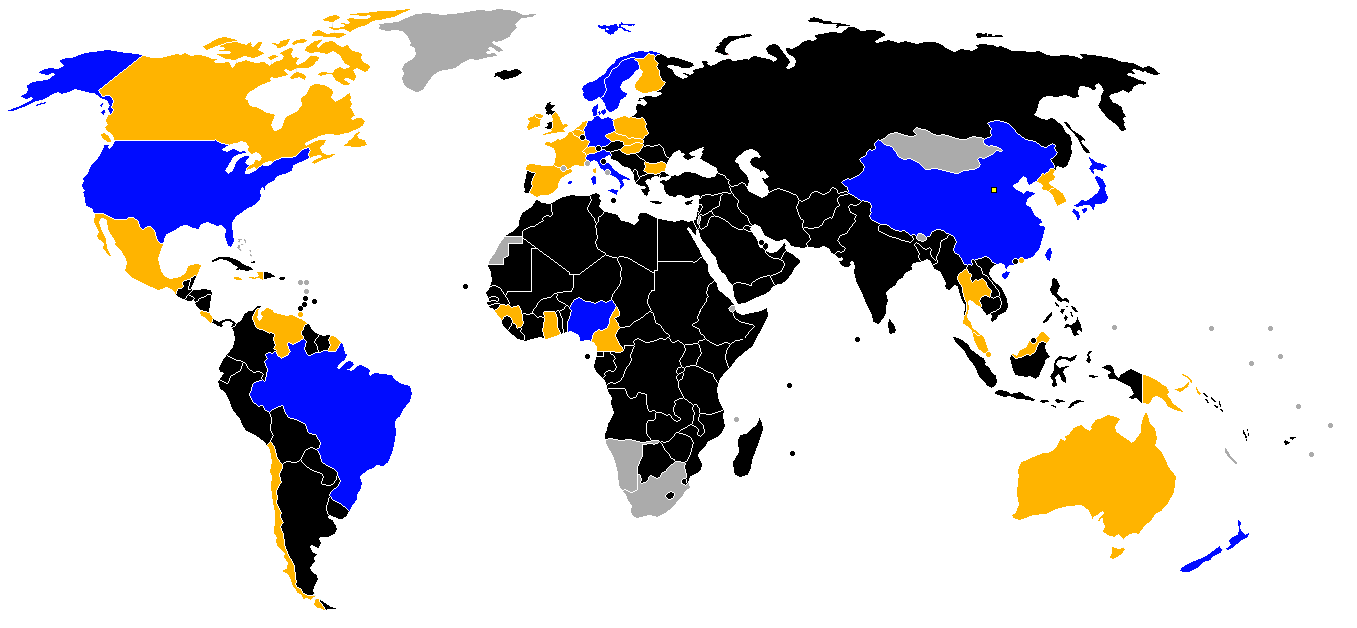
Final qualification status Qualified for the World Cup Failed to qualify Did not enter the World Cup Not a FIFA member

== Qualification process ==
Confederation	Teams started	Teams eliminated	Teams qualified	Qualifying start date	Qualifying end date
AFC	9^{2}	6	3	26 May 1991	8 June 1991
CAF	8	7	1	16 February 1991	30 June 1991
CONCACAF	7^{1}	6	1	18 April 1991	28 April 1991
CONMEBOL	3	2	1	28 April 1991	5 May 1991
OFC	3	2	1	17 May 1991	25 May 1991
UEFA	18	13	5	9 September 1989	14 July 1991
Total	48	36	12	9 September 1989	14 July 1991

- ^{1} 8 nations started, but Martinique were not eligible for World Cup qualification, because they are only members of CONCACAF and not FIFA.
- ^{2} China was selected as host after it qualified to the tournament

== Confederation qualification processes ==
=== Africa (CAF) ===
(8 teams competing for 1 berth)

Qualified: Nigeria

The only African team to qualify to the World Cup was the winner of the 1991 African Women's Championship, Nigeria.

The eight teams were paired together into two knockout ties. The winners of these ties advanced to the second round, who used the same format as the first round. The final round is a two-leg final between the two winners of the second round. The winner, Nigeria qualified to the World Cup and won the tournament by defeating Cameroon 6–0 on aggregate.

Final Round

Team 1	Agg.	Team 2	1st leg	2nd leg
Nigeria	6–0	Cameroon	2–0	4–0

=== Asia (AFC) ===
(9 teams competing for 3 berths)

Qualified: China – Chinese Taipei – Japan

The 1991 AFC Women's Championship, consisting of nine teams, served as the AFC's qualifying tournament.

The first round was composed of two groups, one of four teams and the other of five. The top two teams of the groups advanced to the semi-finals. In the semi-finals, the winners advanced to the final and the losers played the third-place match. The winner, China; runners-up, Japan; and third place, Chinese Taipei, qualified to the World Cup.

Knockout stage

Semifinals
China	1
North Korea	0
Japan	0 (5)
Chinese Taipei	0 (4)

Final
China	5
Japan	0
Third place
Chinese Taipei	0 (5)
North Korea	0 (4)

China PR, Japan, and Chinese Taipei qualified for the World Cup.

=== Europe (UEFA) ===
(18 teams competing for 5 berths)

Qualified: Denmark – Germany – Italy – Norway – Sweden

The first official edition of the UEFA Women's Championship served also as UEFA's qualifying tournament for the World Cup. Out of the 18 teams participating in the tournament, the qualifiers were the four semi-finalists—Denmark, Germany, Italy, and Norway—and the best quarter-final loser, Sweden, who lost their two-leg quarter-final clash against Italy on a single away goal.

The UEFA Women's Championship had held its own qualifying campaign. It began in September 1989, and ended with a final four–style tournament in Denmark, held in July 1991, only four months before the World Cup.

Germany won the tournament by beating Norway 3–1 in extra time.

Second round

Team 1	Agg.	Team 2	1st leg	2nd leg
Norway	4–1	Hungary	2–1	2–0
Sweden	1–1^{3}	Italy	1–1	0–0
Denmark	1–0	Netherlands	0–0	1–0 (a.e.t.)
England	1–6	Germany	1–4	0–2

- ^{3} Italy won based on the away goals rule and qualified; Sweden qualified for being the best quarter-final loser.

Knockout stage

Semifinals
Norway	0 (8)
Denmark	0 (7)
Germany	3
Italy	0

Final
Norway	1
Germany	3 (a.e.t.)
Third place
Denmark	2 (a.e.t.)
Italy	1

Denmark, Germany, Italy, Norway, and Sweden qualified for the World Cup.

=== North, Central America & the Caribbean (CONCACAF) ===
(7 teams competing for 1 berth) ^{5}

Qualified: United States

The 1991 CONCACAF's Women's Championship, despite being an unofficial competition, determined the CONCACAF's single qualifier for the World Cup – the winner, the United States. The tournament took place in Port-au-Prince, Haiti in April 1991 and consisted of 8 teams.

Knockout Stage

Semifinals
Canada	6
Trinidad and Tobago	0
United States	10
Haiti	0

Final
United States	5
Canada	0
Third place
Trinidad and Tobago	4
Haiti	2

- ^{5}Martinique were not members of FIFA

United States qualified for the World Cup.

=== Oceania (OFC) ===
(3 teams competing for 1 berth)

Qualified: New Zealand

Only three teams participated in the tournament which took place in Sydney, Australia in May 1991: Australia, New Zealand and Papua New Guinea. The teams played in a round-robin tournament in which each team played 2 matches against each opponent, with the first placed team qualifying.

The competition was eventually decided through goal-difference, as the matches between Australia and New Zealand ended with one win to each side, and both teams won all matches against Papua New Guinea.

Final standings

Pos	Team	Pld	W	D	L	GF	GA	GD	Pts	Qualification
1	New Zealand (C)	4	3	0	1	28	1	+27	6	Qualification for 1991 FIFA Women's World Cup
2	Australia (H)	4	3	0	1	21	1	+20	6	
3	Papua New Guinea	4	0	0	4	0	47	−47	0	

Source: RSSSF
(C) Champions; (H) Hosts

=== South America (CONMEBOL) ===
(3 teams competing for 1 berth)

Qualified: Brazil

The first edition of the Sudamericano Femenino (Women's South American Championship), held in April–May 1991 determined CONMEBOL's qualifier. The host of the tournament Brazil won the tournament and with it the right to represent South America in the World Cup.

Final standings

Pos	Team	Pld	W	D	L	GF	GA	GD	Pts
1	Brazil	2	2	0	0	12	2	+10	4
2	Chile	2	1	0	1	2	6	−4	2
3	Venezuela	2	0	0	2	1	7	−6	0

Brazil qualified for the World Cup.
