= 2011 FIFA Women's World Cup qualification =

Tournament details
- Teams: 125 (from 6 confederations)

Tournament statistics
- Top scorer: (Spain) Adriana Martín (16 goals)

Qualification for the 2011 FIFA Women's World Cup determines which 15 teams join Germany, the hosts of the 2011 tournament, to play for the Women's World Cup. Europe has 5.5 qualifying berths (including the hosts), Asia 3 berths, North and Central America 2.5 berths, Africa 2 berths, South America 2 berths and Oceania 1 berth. The 16th spot was determined through a play-off match between the third-placed team in North/Central America and the winner of repechage play-offs in Europe.

== Qualified teams ==
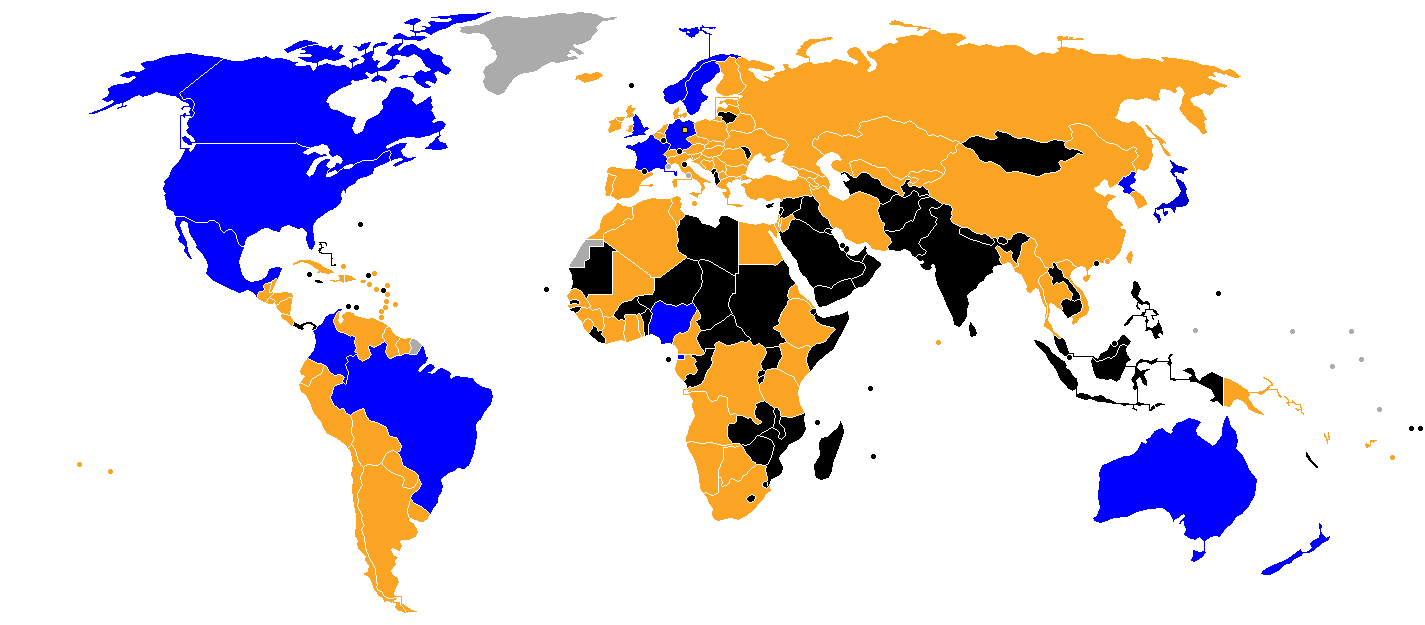
Country qualified for World Cup Country failed to qualify Country did not enter qualification Country not a FIFA member

Team	Qualified as	Qualification date	Appearance in finals	Consecutive streak	Previous best performance	FIFA Ranking^{1}
Germany	Host nation	30 October 2007	6th	6	Champions (2003, 2007)	2
Australia	2010 AFC Women's Asian Cup winner	27 May 2010	5th	5	Quarter-finals (2007)	11
North Korea	2010 AFC Women's Asian Cup runner-up	27 May 2010	4th	4	Quarter-finals (2007)	8
Japan	2010 AFC Women's Asian Cup third place	30 May 2010	6th	6	Quarter-finals (1995)	4
France	UEFA qualifying competition play-off winner	15 September 2010	2nd	1	First round (2003)	7
Norway	UEFA qualifying competition play-off winner	15 September 2010	6th	6	Champions (1995)	9
Sweden	UEFA qualifying competition play-off winner	16 September 2010	6th	6	Runner-Up (2003)	5
England	UEFA qualifying competition play-off winner	16 September 2010	3rd	2	Quarter-finals (1995, 2007)	10
New Zealand	2010 OFC Women's Championship winner	8 October 2010	3rd	2	First round (1991, 2007)	24
Canada	2010 CONCACAF Women's Gold Cup winner	5 November 2010	5th	5	Fourth place (2003)	6
Mexico	2010 CONCACAF Women's Gold Cup runner-up	5 November 2010	2nd	1	First round (1999)	22
Nigeria	2010 African Women's Football Championship winner	11 November 2010	6th	6	Quarter-finals (1999)	27
Equatorial Guinea	2010 African Women's Football Championship runner-up	11 November 2010	1st	1	First appearance	61
Brazil	2010 Sudamericano Femenino winner	19 November 2010	6th	6	Runner-Up (2007)	3
Colombia	2010 Sudamericano Femenino runner-up	21 November 2010	1st	1	First appearance	31
United States	UEFA-CONCACAF play-off winner	27 November 2010	6th	6	Champions (1991, 1999)	1

1.The rankings are shown as of 18 March 2011, the latest published.

== Africa ==
(24 teams competing for 2 berths)

As in the previous World Cup cycle the African Women's Championship will serve as the qualification tournament for the Women's World Cup. The tournament was scheduled to be held from 31 October to 14 November 2010 in South Africa. The two finalists will advance to the Women's World Cup finals in Germany.

Eight teams will compete in the continental finals in South Africa, with qualification consisting of two rounds of knock-out home and away ties. The preliminary round was held in March 2010, with winners advancing to the first round of qualification, which was held in May and June 2010.

The seven winners from this round, along with hosts South Africa, advanced to the continental finals. These finals will consist of two round-robin groups of four teams. The top two finishers in each group will advance to the two semi-finals, with each semi-final winner qualifying for the World Cup finals.

=== Final tournament ===
Knockout stage

Semi finals
11 November
Nigeria	5
Cameroon	1
11 November
Equatorial Guinea	3 (aet)
South Africa	1

Final
14 November
Nigeria	4
Equatorial Guinea	2
Third place play-off
14 November
Cameroon	0
South Africa	2

== Asia ==
(17 teams competing for 3 berths)

As in the previous World Cup cycle, the 2010 AFC Women's Asian Cup served as a qualifying tournament.

The five leading AFC nations, North Korea (the defending AFC women's champions), South Korea, Japan, China and Australia were automatic qualifiers for the finals (held from 19 to 30 May 2010). They were joined by the winners of each of three qualification groups held in July 2009. A preliminary round of qualification held in April and May 2009 began the qualifiers for the 2011 finals.

The final tournament was held in Chengdu, China. The two finalists – Australia and North Korea – and the winner of the third place play-off – Japan – qualified for the Women's World Cup finals. For the first time in the history of FIFA Women's World Cup, China failed to qualify for the finals.

=== Final qualification ===
Knockout stage

Semi finals
Japan	0
Australia	1
China	0
North Korea	1 (aet)

Final
Australia	1 (5)
North Korea	1 (4)
Third place playoff
Japan	2
China	0

== Europe ==
(41 teams competing for 4 or 5 berths, host nation Germany also qualifies)

Forty-one teams from Europe were drawn into eight groups on 17 March 2009. These groups were played between August 2009 and August 2010. The group winners advanced to four home-and-away play-offs (held in September 2010), with the winners advancing to the World Cup finals. The four losing teams competed in repechage play-offs the following month to determine a team to play against the third-placed CONCACAF team for the 16th place in the finals.

Unlike previous qualification tournaments, all UEFA member nations were eligible to qualify. In the past, only those nations in the top tier of European nations played in qualification groups.

=== Direct qualification play-offs ===
Team 1	Agg.	Team 2	1st leg	2nd leg
France	3–2	Italy	0–0	3–2
England	5–2	Switzerland	2–0	3–2
Ukraine	0–3	Norway	0–1	0–2
Sweden	4–3	Denmark	2–1	2–2

=== Repechage play-offs ===
Italy advanced to the UEFA-CONCACAF playoff.

Repechage I
1	Ukraine	0	0	0
4	Italy	3	0	3
3	Denmark	1	0	1
2	Switzerland	3	0	3

Repechage II
Italy	1	4	5
Switzerland	0	2	2

== North America, Central America and Caribbean ==
(26 teams competing for 2 or 3 berths)

As with the last World Cup, the CONCACAF Women's Championship served as the region's qualification tournament. The United States, Canada and Mexico received byes to the tournament, where they were joined by three teams from the Caribbean zone and two from Central America. Both finalists qualified automatically to the 2011 Women's World Cup. The third placed team met the fifth placed team from UEFA for an additional World Cup berth. The tournament was held in Cancún, Mexico, from 28 October to 8 November 2010.

=== Women's Gold Cup ===
Knockout stage

Semi finals
5 November
Canada	4
Costa Rica	0
5 November
United States	1
Mexico	2

Final
8 November
Canada	1
Mexico	0
Third place play-off
8 November
Costa Rica	0
United States	3

== Oceania ==
(8 teams competing for 1 berth)

As in the previous World Cup cycle, the 2010 OFC Women's Championship served as a qualifying tournament. The tournament was held in Auckland, New Zealand, from 29 September to 8 October 2010.

Teams played in two groups of four, followed by semi-finals and a final and third-place play-off. The winners, New Zealand, qualified for the Women's World Cup finals.

=== Final qualification ===
Knockout stage

Semi-finals
6 October – Auckland
New Zealand	8
Solomon Islands	0
6 October – Auckland
Papua New Guinea	1
Cook Islands	0

Final
8 October – Auckland
New Zealand	11
Papua New Guinea	0
Third place
8 October – Auckland
Solomon Islands	0
Cook Islands	2

== South America ==
(10 teams competing for 2 berths)

As with previous World Cup qualifications, the Sudamericano Femenino was used to determine the qualification to the World Cup finals. Qualification was held between 4 and 21 November in Ecuador.

=== Final positions ===
Second stage

Team	Pld	Pts
Brazil	3	9
Colombia	3	4
Chile	3	2
Argentina	3	1

== UEFA–CONCACAF play-off ==
The winner of the third-place play-off at the 2010 CONCACAF Women's Gold Cup will play-off against the winner of the repechage play-offs from the UEFA qualification tournament. The draw for the order of legs was held at the FIFA headquarters in Zürich, Switzerland on 17 March 2010. The matches were played on 20 and 27 November 2010.

Team 1	Agg.	Team 2	1st leg	2nd leg
Italy	0–2	United States	0–1	0–1
