= 1995 FIFA Women's World Cup qualification =

1995 FIFA Women's World Cup Qualification
Tournament details
- Dates: 13 August 1994 - 26 March 1995
- Teams: 55 (from 6 confederations)

Tournament statistics
- Matches played: 135
- Goals scored: 655 (4.85 per match)

The qualification process for the 1995 FIFA Women's World Cup saw 54 teams from the six FIFA confederations compete for the 11 places in the tournament's finals. Sweden qualified automatically as hosts. The places were divided as follows:

- Africa - represented by the CAF: 1 berth
- Asia - AFC: 2
- Europe - UEFA: 5 (Sweden qualified automatically as hosts)
- North, Central America & the Caribbean - CONCACAF: 2
- Oceania - OFC: 1
- South America - CONMEBOL: 1

A total of 52 teams played at least one qualifying match. A total of 135 qualifying matches were played, and 655 goals were scored (an average of 4.85 per match).

== Qualified teams ==
The following 12 teams qualified for the 1995 FIFA Women's World Cup:

| Team | Finals appearances | Streak | Last appearance |
|---|---|---|---|
| Australia | 1st | 1 | — |
| Brazil | 2nd | 2 | 1991 |
| Canada | 1st | 1 | — |
| China | 2nd | 2 | 1991 |
| Denmark | 2nd | 2 | 1991 |
| England | 1st | 1 | — |
| Germany | 2nd | 2 | 1991 |
| Japan | 2nd | 2 | 1991 |
| Nigeria | 2nd | 2 | 1991 |
| Norway | 2nd | 2 | 1991 |
| Sweden (H) | 2nd | 2 | 1991 |
| United States | 2nd | 2 | 1991 |

(H) : qualified automatically as hosts

== Confederation qualification processes ==
=== Africa (CAF) ===
(8 teams competing for 1 berth)

Qualified: Nigeria

The one African team to qualify to the World Cup was the winner of the 1995 CAF Women's Championship, Nigeria. Nigeria won the tournament by defeating South Africa 11–2 on aggregate in a two-leg final.

Final Round

| Team 1 | Agg. | Team 2 | 1st leg | 2nd leg |
|---|---|---|---|---|
| Nigeria | 11–2 | South Africa | 4–1 | 7–1 |

4 March 1995

| Nigeria | 4–1 | South Africa |

Ibadan, Nigeria
18 March 1995

| South Africa | 1–7 | Nigeria |

Johannesburg, South Africa

Nigeria qualified for the World Cup.

=== Asia (AFC) ===
(4 teams competing for 2 berths)

Qualified: China – Japan

The two Asian teams to qualify to the World Cup were the two finalists of the women's football tournament at the 1994 Asian Games. The tournament took place in Hiroshima, Japan from 3–12 October and consisted of 4 teams.

| Team | Pts | Pld | W | D | L | GF | GA | GD |
|---|---|---|---|---|---|---|---|---|
| Japan | 7 | 3 | 2 | 1 | 0 | 9 | 1 | 8 |
| China | 7 | 3 | 2 | 1 | 0 | 8 | 1 | 7 |
| Chinese Taipei | 3 | 3 | 1 | 0 | 2 | 2 | 8 | -6 |
| South Korea | 0 | 3 | 0 | 0 | 3 | 0 | 9 | -9 |

Final

12 October
18:00

| Japan | 0–2 | China |
|---|---|---|
| | | Chen Yufeng 21'; Sun Wen 47' |

Takegahana Stadium, Fukuyama

China and Japan qualified for the World Cup

=== Europe (UEFA) ===
(30 teams competing for 4 berths, host Sweden qualifies automatically)

Qualified: Sweden – England – Germany – Norway – Denmark

The third official edition of the UEFA Women's Championship served also as UEFA's qualifying tournament for the World Cup. Out of the 29 teams participating in the tournament, the qualifiers were the four semi-finalists - Sweden (qualified as host of the World Cup), England, Germany and Norway - and the best quarter-final loser - Denmark.

Tournament bracket

Semifinals
England | 1 | 1 | 2
Germany | 4 | 2 | 6
Norway | 4 | 1 | 5
Sweden | 3 | 4 | 7

Final
Germany | 3 | —^{1} | 3
Sweden | 2 | — | 2

- ^{1} No second leg was played.

Final

26 March 1995

| Germany | 3–2 | Sweden |
|---|---|---|
| Meinert 33'; Prinz 64'; Wiegmann 85' | | Andersson 6'; Andelén 89' |

Fritz-Walter-Stadion, Kaiserslautern
Attendance: 8 500
Referee: Ilkka Koho (Finland)

England, Germany, Norway and Denmark qualified for the World Cup. Sweden qualified automatically as hosts.

=== North, Central America & the Caribbean (CONCACAF) ===
(5 teams competing for 2 berths)

Qualified: United States – Canada

The 1994 CONCACAF's Women's Championship determined the CONCACAF's two qualifiers for the FIFA Women's World Cup 1995 — the winner the United States and the runner-up Canada. The tournament took place in Montreal, Quebec, Canada between 13 & 21 August 1994.

Final standings

| Team | Pts | Pld | W | D | L | GF | GA |
|---|---|---|---|---|---|---|---|
| United States | 12 | 4 | 4 | 0 | 0 | 36 | 1 |
| Canada | 9 | 4 | 3 | 0 | 1 | 18 | 6 |
| Mexico | 4 | 4 | 1 | 1 | 2 | 6 | 19 |
| Trinidad and Tobago | 4 | 4 | 1 | 1 | 2 | 6 | 20 |
| Jamaica | 0 | 4 | 0 | 0 | 4 | 2 | 22 |

United States and Canada qualified for the World Cup.

=== Oceania (OFC) ===
Qualified: Australia

The OFC was the only one of the six FIFA confederations to hold a specified qualifying competition.

Only three teams participated in the tournament which took place in Papua New Guinea between 14 & 20 October 1994: Australia, New Zealand and Papua New Guinea. The teams played in a round-robin tournament in which each team played 2 matches against each opponent, and in which the qualifier would be the team who finished first.

| Pos | Team | Pld | W | D | L | GF | GA | GD | Pts | Qualification |
|---|---|---|---|---|---|---|---|---|---|---|
| 1 | Australia (C) | 4 | 3 | 0 | 1 | 13 | 2 | +11 | 9 | Qualification for 1995 FIFA Women's World Cup |
| 2 | New Zealand | 4 | 3 | 0 | 1 | 10 | 2 | +8 | 9 | |
| 3 | Papua New Guinea (H) | 4 | 0 | 0 | 4 | 0 | 19 | −19 | 0 | |

Source: RSSSF
(C) Champions; (H) Hosts

=== South America (CONMEBOL) ===
Qualified: Brazil

The second edition of the Sudamericano Femenino (Women's South American Championship) in 1995 determined the CONMEBOL's qualifier. Brazil won the tournament.

Final standings

| Team | Pts | Pld | W | D | L | GF | GA |
|---|---|---|---|---|---|---|---|
| Brazil | 12 | 4 | 4 | 0 | 0 | 42 | 1 |
| Argentina | 9 | 4 | 3 | 0 | 1 | 18 | 9 |
| Chile | 4 | 4 | 1 | 1 | 2 | 14 | 9 |
| Ecuador | 4 | 4 | 1 | 1 | 2 | 9 | 21 |
| Bolivia | 0 | 4 | 0 | 0 | 4 | 1 | 44 |

Final

22 January 1995

| Brazil | 2–0 | Argentina |

Brazil

Brazil qualified for the World Cup.
