= 1999 FIFA Women's World Cup qualification =

1999 FIFA Women's World Cup Qualification
Tournament details
- Dates: August 16, 1997 – December 19, 1998
- Teams: 87 (from 6 confederations)

The qualification process for the 1999 FIFA Women's World Cup saw 86 teams from the six FIFA confederations compete for the 16 places in the tournament's finals. The places were divided as follows:

- Africa – represented by the CAF: 2 berths
- Asia – AFC: 3
- Europe – UEFA: 6
- North America, Central American and the Caribbean – CONCACAF: 2.5 (USA qualified automatically as hosts)
- Oceania – OFC: 1
- South America – CONMEBOL: 1.5

Dates : August 16, 1997 - December 19, 1998

== Qualified teams ==
Team	Qualified as	Qualification date	Appearance in finals	Last appearance	Consecutive streak
United States	Hosts	31 May 1996	3rd	1995	3
China	1997 AFC Women's Championship champions	December 12, 1997	3rd	1995	3
North Korea	1997 AFC Women's Championship runner-up	December 12, 1997	1st	–	1
Japan	1997 AFC Women's Championship 3rd place	December 14, 1997	3rd	1995	3
Brazil	1998 South American Women's Football Championship champions	March 15, 1998	3rd	1995	3
Italy	UEFA qualification Group 2 winners	June 27, 1998	2nd	1991	1
Sweden	UEFA qualification Group 1 winners	August 8, 1998	3rd	1995	3
Norway	UEFA qualification Group 3 winners	August 15, 1998	3rd	1995	3
Denmark	UEFA qualification Group 4 winners	August 22, 1998	3rd	1995	3
Canada	1998 CONCACAF Women's Championship champions	September 6, 1998	2nd	1995	2
Russia	UEFA qualification Play-off winners	October 11, 1998	1st	–	1
Germany	UEFA qualification Play-off winners	October 11, 1998	3rd	1995	3
Australia	1998 OFC Women's Championship champions	October 17, 1998	2nd	1995	2
Nigeria	1998 African Women's Championship champions	October 27, 1998	3rd	1995	3
Ghana	1998 African Women's Championship runner-up	October 27, 1998	1st	–	1
Mexico	CONCACAF–CONMEBOL play-off winners	December 19, 1998	1st	–	1

== Qualification groups ==
=== Africa (CAF) ===
Qualified: Nigeria – Ghana

The two African teams to qualify to the World Cup were the two finalists of the 1998 CAF Women's Championship, Nigeria and Ghana.

=== Asia (AFC) ===
Qualified: China – Japan – North Korea

The three Asian teams to qualify to the World Cup were the two finalists and the third-placed of the 1997 AFC Women's Championship.

=== Europe (UEFA) ===
Qualified: Sweden – Russia – Germany – Norway – Denmark – Italy

The 16 teams belonging to Class A of European women's football were drawn into four groups, from which the group winners qualify for the World Cup. The four runners-up were drawn into two home-and-away knock-out matches, winners of those matches also qualifying.

=== North, Central America and the Caribbean (CONCACAF) ===
Qualified: United States – Canada – Mexico

The 1998 CONCACAF's Women's Championship winner Canada qualified for the FIFA Women's World Cup 1999. The runner-up Mexico qualified in two playoff-matches against the second-placed team of CONMEBOL – Argentina. The United States qualified as hosts.

=== Oceania (OFC) ===
Qualified: Australia

The 1998 OFC Women's Championship determined the OFC's one qualifier for the FIFA Women's World Cup 1999 – the winner Australia.

=== South America (CONMEBOL) ===
Qualified: Brazil

The third edition of the Sudamericano Femenino (Women's South American Championship) in 1998 determined the CONMEBOL's qualifier. Brazil won the tournament.

== CONCACAF–CONMEBOL play-off ==
The runners-up of the CONMEBOL and CONCACAF qualification tournaments played for one berth.

Team 1	Agg.	Team 2	1st leg	2nd leg
Mexico	6–3	Argentina	3–1	3–2
