= 2003 FIFA Women's World Cup Group C =

Football tournament group stage

Group C of the 2003 FIFA Women's World Cup was one of four groups of nations, consisting of Argentina, Canada, Germany and Japan. It began on September 20 and its last matches were played on September 27. Most matches were played at the Columbus Crew Stadium in Columbus. Germany won every match, while Argentina failed to win a match. Despite beating Argentina 6–0, Japan failed to advance, while a young Canada team surprisingly made the second round.

== Standings ==
Pos	Team	Pld	W	D	L	GF	GA	GD	Pts	Qualification
1	Germany	3	3	0	0	13	2	+11	9	Advance to knockout stage
2	Canada	3	2	0	1	7	5	+2	6	Advance to knockout stage
3	Japan	3	1	0	2	7	6	+1	3	
4	Argentina	3	0	0	3	1	15	−14	0	

Source: FIFA
Rules for classification: Group stage tiebreakers

== Matches ==
All times local EDT/UTC−4)

=== Germany vs Canada ===
September 20, 2003
17:45

Germany	4–1	Canada
Wiegmann 39' (pen.); Gottschlich 47'; Prinz 75'; Garefrekes 90+2'	Report	Sinclair 4'

Columbus Crew Stadium, Columbus
Attendance: 16,409
Referee: Im Eun-ju (South Korea)

GK	1	Silke Rottenberg
DF	2	Kerstin Stegemann
DF	3	Linda Bresonik	(yellow card) 45+1'
DF	13	Sandra Minnert
DF	19	Stefanie Gottschlich
DF	17	Ariane Hingst		(substituted off) 65'
MF	5	Steffi Jones
MF	10	Bettina Wiegmann (c)
MF	6	Renate Lingor		(substituted off) 73'
FW	14	Maren Meinert	(yellow card) 78'
FW	9	Birgit Prinz
Substitutions:
DF	4	Nia Künzer		(substituted in) 65'
MF	18	Kerstin Garefrekes		(substituted in) 73'
Manager:
Tina Theune-Meyer

GK	1	Karina Leblanc	(yellow card) 21'
DF	6	Sharolta Nonen
DF	18	Tanya Dennis
MF	8	Kristina Kiss
MF	5	Andrea Neil
MF	16	Brittany Timko
MF	13	Diana Matheson
MF	15	Kara Lang		(substituted off) 46'
MF	2	Christine Latham
FW	10	Charmaine Hooper (c)	(yellow card) 38'
FW	12	Christine Sinclair
Substitutions:
FW	9	Rhian Wilkinson		(substituted in) 46'
Manager:
(Norway) Even Pellerud

Player of the Match:
Maren Meinert (Germany)

Assistant referees:
Choi Soo-Jin (South Korea)
Hong Kum-Nyo (North Korea)
Fourth official:
Sandra Hunt (United States)

=== Japan vs Argentina ===
September 20, 2003
20:30

Japan	6–0	Argentina
Sawa 13', 38'; Yamamoto 64'; Otani 72', 75', 80'	Report

Columbus Crew Stadium, Columbus
Attendance: 16,409
Referee: Katriina Elovirta (Finland)

GK	1	Nozomi Yamago
CB	4	Yasuyo Yamagishi	(substituted off) 73'
CB	2	Yumi Obe (c)
CB	14	Kyoko Yano
RM	7	Naoko Kawakami
CM	5	Tomoe Sakai
CM	8	Tomomi Miyamoto
LM	16	Emi Yamamoto
AM	10	Homare Sawa	(substituted off) 80'
CF	6	Yayoi Kobayashi	(substituted off) 57'
CF	11	Mio Otani
Substitutions:
FW	9	Eriko Arakawa	(substituted in) 57'
DF	3	Hiromi Isozaki	(substituted in) 73'
FW	18	Karina Maruyama	(substituted in) 80'
Manager:
Eiji Ueda

GK	1	Romina Ferro
DF	3	Mariela Ricotti		(substituted off) 76'
DF	2	Clarisa Huber
DF	4	Andrea Gonsebate
DF	19	Celeste Barbitta	(yellow card) 59'
MF	5	Marisa Gerez (c)
MF	10	Rosana Gómez	(yellow card) 18'	(substituted off) 46'
FW	20	Elizabeth Villanueva	(yellow card) 16'	(substituted off) 46'
FW	18	Mariela Coronel
FW	14	Fabiana Vallejos
FW	8	Natalia Gatti	(red card) 39'
Substitutions:
DF	17	Valeria Cotelo		(substituted in) 46'
FW	7	Karina Alvariza		(substituted in) 46'
DF	6	Noelia López		(substituted in) 76'
Manager:
Carlos Borrello

Player of the Match:
Emi Yamamoto (Japan)

Assistant referees:
Emilia Parviainen (Finland)
Andi Regan (Northern Ireland)
Fourth official:
Sandra Hunt (United States)

=== Germany vs Japan ===
September 24, 2003
17:45

Germany	3–0	Japan
Minnert 23'; Prinz 36', 66'	Report

Columbus Crew Stadium, Columbus
Attendance: 15,529
Referee: Sueli Tortura (Brazil)

GK	1	Silke Rottenberg
DF	2	Kerstin Stegemann
DF	13	Sandra Minnert
DF	19	Stefanie Gottschlich		(substituted off) 64'
DF	17	Ariane Hingst		(substituted off) 72'
MF	5	Steffi Jones
MF	10	Bettina Wiegmann (c)		(substituted off) 78'
MF	18	Kerstin Garefrekes
MF	6	Renate Lingor
FW	14	Maren Meinert
FW	9	Birgit Prinz
Substitutions:
FW	8	Sandra Smisek		(substituted in) 64'
DF	3	Linda Bresonik		(substituted in) 72'
DF	4	Nia Künzer	(yellow card) 80'	(substituted in) 78'
Manager:
Tina Theune-Meyer

GK	1	Nozomi Yamago
CB	4	Yasuyo Yamagishi
CB	2	Yumi Obe (c)
CB	14	Kyoko Yano	(substituted off) 60'
RM	7	Naoko Kawakami
CM	5	Tomoe Sakai	(substituted off) 56'
CM	8	Tomomi Miyamoto
LM	16	Emi Yamamoto
AM	10	Homare Sawa
CF	6	Yayoi Kobayashi	(substituted off) 56'
CF	11	Mio Otani
Substitutions:
FW	9	Eriko Arakawa	(substituted in) 56'
MF	17	Miyuki Yanagita	(substituted in) 56'
DF	3	Hiromi Isozaki	(substituted in) 60'
Manager:
Eiji Ueda

Player of the Match:
Bettina Wiegmann (Germany)

Assistant referees:
Cleidy Mary Ribeiro (Brazil)
Marlei Silva (Brazil)
Fourth official:
Sandra Hunt (United States)

=== Canada vs Argentina ===
September 24, 2003
20:30

Canada	3–0	Argentina
Hooper 19' (pen.); Latham 79', 82'	Report

Columbus Crew Stadium, Columbus
Attendance: 15,529
Referee: Nicole Petignat (Switzerland)

GK	20	Taryn Swiatek
DF	6	Sharolta Nonen
DF	18	Tanya Dennis
MF	8	Kristina Kiss
MF	9	Rhian Wilkinson	(yellow card) 62'	(substituted off) 75'
MF	16	Brittany Timko
MF	13	Diana Matheson	(yellow card) 41'
MF	15	Kara Lang
MF	2	Christine Latham		(substituted off) 83'
FW	10	Charmaine Hooper (c)
FW	12	Christine Sinclair
Substitutions:
FW	17	Silvana Burtini		(substituted in) 75'
DF	4	Sasha Andrews	(yellow card) 86'	(substituted in) 83'
Manager:
(Norway) Even Pellerud

GK	1	Romina Ferro
DF	3	Mariela Ricotti	(yellow card) 29'	(substituted off) 78'
DF	2	Clarisa Huber
DF	4	Andrea Gonsebate
DF	19	Celeste Barbitta
MF	5	Marisa Gerez (c)
MF	10	Rosana Gómez
FW	20	Elizabeth Villanueva		(substituted off) 75'
FW	18	Mariela Coronel		(substituted off) 84'
FW	14	Fabiana Vallejos
FW	11	Marisol Medina
Substitutions:
FW	7	Karina Alvariza		(substituted in) 75'
DF	6	Noelia López		(substituted in) 78'
MF	15	Yanina Gaitán		(substituted in) 84'
Manager:
Carlos Borrello

Player of the Match:
Christine Latham (Canada)

Assistant referees:
Elke Lüthi (Switzerland)
Nelly Viennot (France)
Fourth official:
Sandra Hunt (United States)

=== Canada vs Japan ===
September 27, 2003
15:30

Canada	3–1	Japan
Latham 36'; Sinclair 49'; Lang 72'	Report	Sawa 20'

Gillette Stadium, Foxborough
Attendance: 14,356
Referee: Im Eun-ju (South Korea)

GK	20	Taryn Swiatek
DF	6	Sharolta Nonen
DF	18	Tanya Dennis
DF	7	Isabelle Morneau	(yellow card) 45+1'
MF	5	Andrea Neil		(substituted off) 77'
MF	16	Brittany Timko
MF	13	Diana Matheson
MF	15	Kara Lang		(substituted off) 86'
MF	2	Christine Latham		(substituted off) 60'
FW	10	Charmaine Hooper (c)
FW	12	Christine Sinclair
Substitutions:
FW	17	Silvana Burtini		(substituted in) 60'
MF	8	Kristina Kiss		(substituted in) 77'
MF	9	Rhian Wilkinson		(substituted in) 85'
Manager:
(Norway) Even Pellerud

GK	1	Nozomi Yamago
CB	4	Yasuyo Yamagishi
CB	2	Yumi Obe (c)
CB	3	Hiromi Isozaki
RM	7	Naoko Kawakami
CM	5	Tomoe Sakai	(substituted off) 62'
CM	8	Tomomi Miyamoto
LM	16	Emi Yamamoto	(substituted off) 89'
AM	10	Homare Sawa
CF	6	Yayoi Kobayashi	(substituted off) 54'
CF	11	Mio Otani
Substitutions:
FW	9	Eriko Arakawa	(substituted in) 54'
MF	17	Miyuki Yanagita	(substituted in) 62'
MF	20	Aya Miyama	(substituted in) 89'
Manager:
Eiji Ueda

Player of the Match:
Tomomi Miyamoto (Japan)

Assistant referees:
Choi Soo-Jin (South Korea)
Hong Kum-Nyo (North Korea)
Fourth official:
Nicole Petignat (Switzerland)

=== Argentina vs Germany ===
September 27, 2003
15:30

Argentina	1–6	Germany
Gaitán 71'	Report	Meinert 3', 43'; Wiegmann 24' (pen.); Prinz 32'; Pohlers 89'; Müller 90+2'

Robert F. Kennedy Memorial Stadium, Washington, D.C.
Attendance: 17,618
Referee: Bola Elizabeth Abidoye (Nigeria)

GK	1	Romina Ferro
DF	2	Clarisa Huber
DF	4	Andrea Gonsebate
DF	6	Noelia López	(substituted off) 56'
DF	19	Celeste Barbitta
MF	5	Marisa Gerez (c)
MF	10	Rosana Gómez
FW	20	Elizabeth Villanueva	(substituted off) 85'
FW	18	Mariela Coronel
FW	14	Fabiana Vallejos
FW	11	Marisol Medina
Substitutions:
MF	15	Yanina Gaitán	(substituted in) 56'
FW	7	Karina Alvariza	(substituted in) 85'
Manager:
Carlos Borrello

GK	1	Silke Rottenberg
DF	2	Kerstin Stegemann
DF	13	Sandra Minnert
DF	19	Stefanie Gottschlich	(substituted off) 46'
DF	17	Ariane Hingst
MF	5	Steffi Jones	(substituted off) 62'
MF	10	Bettina Wiegmann (c)
MF	18	Kerstin Garefrekes	(substituted off) 46'
MF	6	Renate Lingor
FW	14	Maren Meinert
FW	9	Birgit Prinz
Substitutions:
FW	20	Conny Pohlers	(substituted in) 46'
FW	11	Martina Müller	(substituted in) 46'
DF	12	Sonja Fuss	(substituted in) 62'
Manager:
Tina Theune-Meyer

Player of the Match:
Birgit Prinz (Germany)

Assistant referees:
Elke Lüthi (Switzerland)
Liu Hsiu-mei (Chinese Taipei)
Fourth official:
Sandra Hunt (United States)

== See also ==
- Argentina at the FIFA Women's World Cup
- Canada at the FIFA Women's World Cup
- Germany at the FIFA Women's World Cup
- Japan at the FIFA Women's World Cup
