= Germany at the FIFA Women's World Cup =

Performance of Germany in football tournament

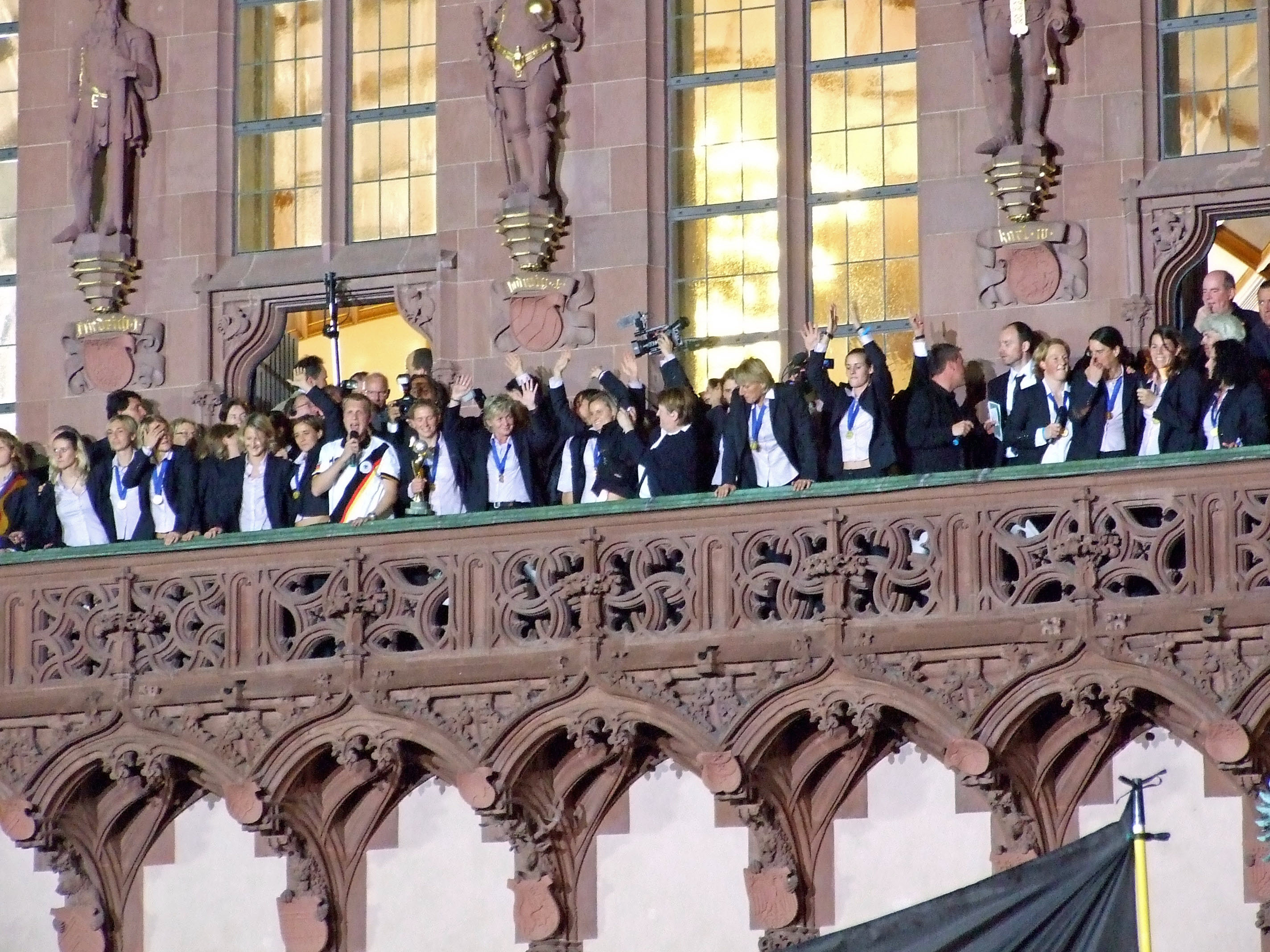
Arrival in Frankfurt after winning the 2007 Women's World Cup

The Germany women's national football team has represented Germany at the FIFA Women's World Cup on nine occasions in 1991, 1995, 1999, 2003, 2007, 2011, 2015, 2019 and 2023. They have won the title twice and were runners-up once. They also reached the fourth place in 1991 and in 2015.

== 1991 World Cup ==
The German national team had qualified as the European Champions for the first World Cup. With 18 players, national coach Gero Bisanz drove to the "Middle Kingdom". In the preliminary round, the German team celebrated three wins and remained without conceding. Nigeria was defeated 4-0, Taiwan 2-0 and Italy national football team 2-0. In the quarter-finals was the opponent Denmark. The game was the first of the World Cup history, which went into extra time. The Bisanz-Elf finally prevailed 2-1. Opponent in the semifinals was the selection of the United States, which was a number too big for the German team. At the end of the match, it was a 0-4 defeat in the third-place match against Sweden. Heidi Mohr proved with her seven tournament goals that she was one of the world's top scorer in her time.

=== Group C ===
Pos	Team	Pld	W	D	L	GF	GA	GD	Pts	Qualification
1	Germany	3	3	0	0	9	0	+9	6	Advance to knockout stage
2	Italy	3	2	0	1	6	2	+4	4	Advance to knockout stage
3	Chinese Taipei	3	1	0	2	2	8	−6	2	Advance to knockout stage
4	Nigeria	3	0	0	3	0	7	−7	0	

Source: FIFA
17 November 1991
15:30

Germany	4–0	Nigeria
Neid 16'; Mohr 32', 34'; Gottschlich 57'	Report

Jiangmen Stadium, Jiangmen
Attendance: 14,000
Referee: Rafael Rodríguez Medina (El Salvador)

19 November 1991
19:45

Chinese Taipei	0–3	Germany
	Report	Wiegmann 10' (pen.); Mohr 21', 50'

Zhongshan Stadium, Zhongshan
Attendance: 10,000
Referee: Fethi Boucetta (Tunisia)

21 November 1991
19:45

Italy	0–2	Germany
	Report	Mohr 67'; Unsleber 79'

Zhongshan Stadium, Zhongshan
Attendance: 12,000
Referee: Jim McCluskey (Scotland)

=== Quarter-finals ===
24 November 1991
15:30

Denmark	1–2 (a.e.t.)	Germany
Mackensie 25' (pen.)	Report	Wiegmann 17' (pen.); Mohr 98'

Zhongshan Stadium, Zhongshan
Attendance: 12,000
Referee: Vassilios Nikakis (Greece)

=== Semi-finals ===
27 November 1991
19:45

Germany	2–5	United States
Mohr 34'; Wiegmann 63'	Report	Jennings 10', 22', 33'; Heinrichs 54', 75'

Guangdong Provincial Stadium, Guangzhou
Attendance: 15,000
Referee: Salvador Imperatore (Chile)

=== Third place play-off ===
29 November 1991
19:45

Sweden	4–0	Germany
Andelén 7'; Sundhage 11'; Videkull 29'; Nilsson 43'	Report

Guangdong Provincial Stadium, Guangzhou
Attendance: 20,000
Referee: Cláudia Vasconcelos (Brazil)

== 1995 World cup ==
Once again, the German team qualified as European champion for the second World Cup. For the first time the World Cup took place on European soil. The German team failed in the final Norway.

The German team started with a painstaking 1-0 victory (goal: Silvia Neid) over Japan in the tournament. In the second group game, the hosts waited and it looked as if the German team could reciprocate for the defeat in the small final of 1991. Bettina Wiegmann and Ursula Lohn ensured the 2-0 half-time lead. After Andersson's strike, the Swedes could still play the game in the last five minutes. Due to the defeat, the last group match against Brazil had to be won. With a brilliant 6: 1 victory, the Elf of Gero Bisanz secured the group victory. Birgit Prinz scored her first World Cup goal.

In the quarter-finals, Germany met England. Maren Meinert, Heidi Mohr and Martina Voss ensured a solid 3-0 victory. The semi-final was more difficult against China. The Chinese made in the defense deft the rooms and allowed only a few chances for the German team. After many futile attempts Bettina Wiegmann scored in the 79th minute the redeeming 1: 0. Thus, the German team reached the final against Norway for the first time. A Norwegian strike just before half-time through Riise and Pettersen sealed the final defeat.

=== Group A ===
Pos	Team	Pld	W	D	L	GF	GA	GD	Pts	Qualification
1	Germany	3	2	0	1	9	4	+5	6	Advance to knockout stage
2	Sweden (H)	3	2	0	1	5	3	+2	6	Advance to knockout stage
3	Japan	3	1	0	2	2	4	−2	3	Advance to knockout stage
4	Brazil	3	1	0	2	3	8	−5	3	

Source: FIFA
(H) Hosts
5 June 1995
14:00

Germany	1–0	Japan
Neid 23'	Report

Tingvalla IP, Karlstad
Attendance: 3,824
Referee: Petros Mathabela (South Africa)

7 June 1995
19:00

Sweden	3–2	Germany
Andersson 65' (pen.), 86'; Sundhage 80'	Report	Wiegmann 9' (pen.); Lohn 42'

Olympia, Helsingborg
Attendance: 5,855
Referee: Linda May Black (New Zealand)

9 June 1995
19:00

Brazil	1–6	Germany
Roseli 19'	Report	Prinz 5'; Meinert 22'; Wiegmann 42' (pen.); Mohr 78', 89'; Bernhard 90'

Tingvalla IP, Karlstad
Attendance: 3,203
Referee: Alain Hamer (Luxembourg)

=== Quarter-finals ===
13 June 1995
20:15

Germany	3–0	England
Voss 41'; Meinert 55'; Mohr 82'	Report

Arosvallen, Västerås
Attendance: 2,317
Referee: Bente Skogvang (Norway)

=== Semi-finals ===
15 June 1995
20:15

Germany	1–0	China
Wiegmann 88'	Report

Olympia, Helsingborg
Attendance: 3,693
Referee: Petros Mathabela (South Africa)

=== Final ===
18 June 1995
18:00

Germany	0–2	Norway
	Report	Riise 37'; Pettersen 40'

Råsunda Stadium, Solna
Attendance: 17,158
Referee: Ingrid Jonsson (Sweden)

== 1999 World Cup ==
For the third World Cup UEFA started Qualifying for the first time). To date, UEFA is the only continental federation to hold separate World Cup qualifiers. The DFB-Elf, who have been coached by Tina Theune-Meyer since 1996, had to relegate after a surprising defeat against Netherlands and another defeat by Norway. In the relegation, the Germans made it all by the 5-0 first-leg victory against Ukraine everything.

The German team was difficult in the preliminary round. At the beginning there was a happy draw against Italy. In the second game, World Cup debutant Mexico was knocked down 6: 0. Inka Grings was the first German player to score three goals in a World Cup match. In the last group match, the team did not come out over a 3: 3 against Brazil and was only second in the group. In the quarterfinals, they met the host and failed on their own nerves. Despite two leads (Brandi Chastain by own goal, Bettina Wiegmann), Theune-Meyer-Elf lost 2: 3.

=== Group B ===
Pos	Team	Pld	W	D	L	GF	GA	GD	Pts	Qualification
1	Brazil	3	2	1	0	12	4	+8	7	Advance to knockout stage
2	Germany	3	1	2	0	10	4	+6	5	Advance to knockout stage
3	Italy	3	1	1	1	3	3	0	4	
4	Mexico	3	0	0	3	1	15	−14	0	

Source: FIFA
June 20, 1999
16:00 PDT (UTC−7)

Germany	1–1	Italy
Wiegmann 61' (pen.)	Report	Panico 36'

Rose Bowl, Pasadena
Attendance: 17,100
Referee: Bola Elizabeth Abidoye (Nigeria)

June 24, 1999
20:30 PDT (UTC−7)

Germany	6–0	Mexico
Grings 10', 57', 90+2'; Smisek 45+1'; Hingst 49'; Lingor 89'	Report

Civic Stadium, Portland
Attendance: 20,129
Referee: Im Eun-ju (South Korea)

June 27, 1999
13:30 EDT (UTC−4)

Germany	3–3	Brazil
Prinz 8'; Wiegmann 46' (pen.); Jones 58'	Report	Kátia 15'; Sissi 20'; Maycon 90+4'

Jack Kent Cooke Stadium, Landover
Attendance: 22,109
Referee: Im Eun-ju (South Korea)

=== Quarter-finals ===
July 1, 1999
19:00 EDT (UTC−4)

United States	3–2	Germany
Milbrett 16'; Chastain 49'; Fawcett 66'	Report	Chastain 5' (o.g.); Wiegmann 45+1'

Jack Kent Cooke Stadium, Landover
Attendance: 54,642
Referee: Martha Liliana Pardo (Colombia)

== 2003 World Cup ==
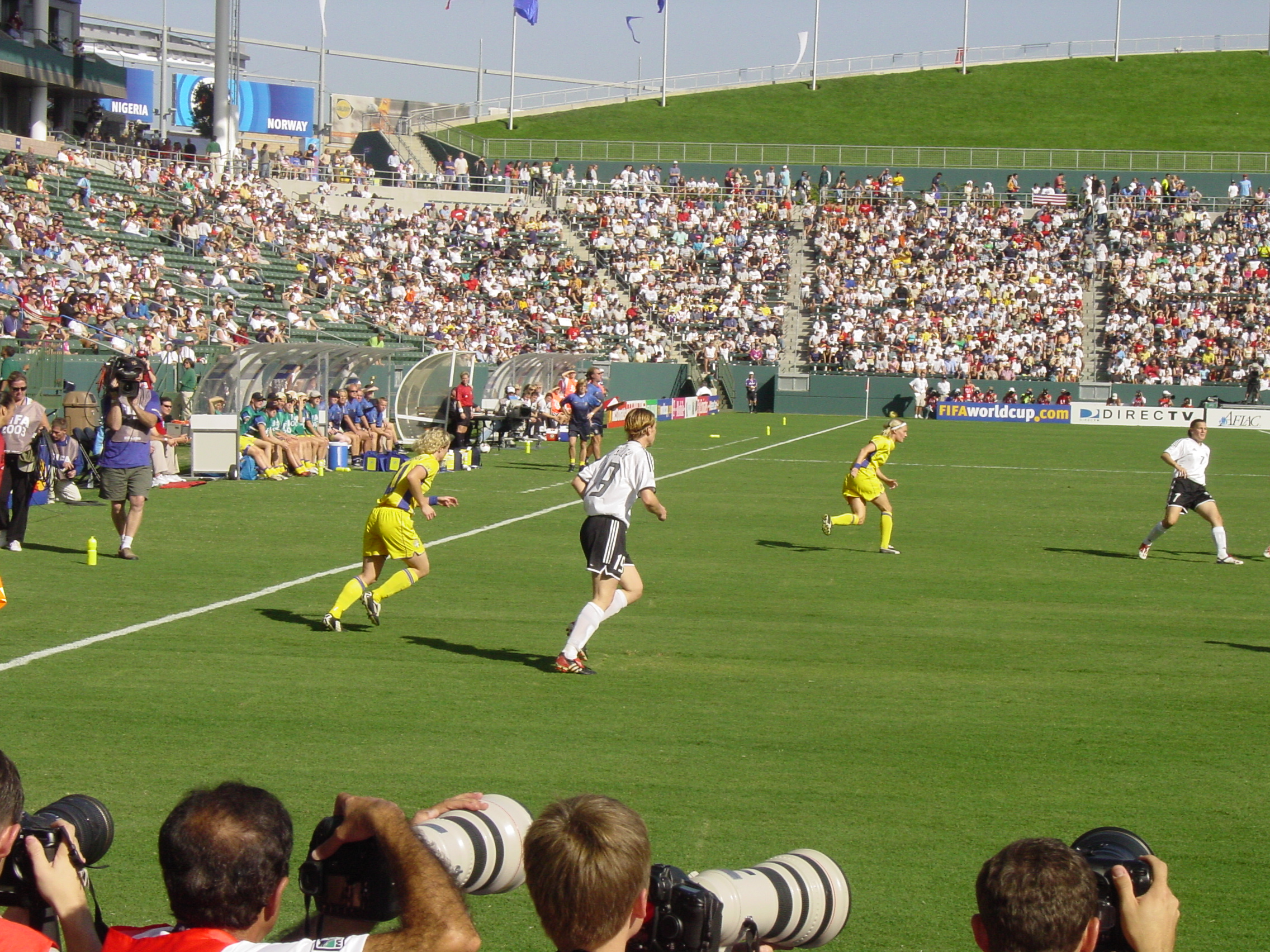
Scene in Final Germany - Sweden

At the 2003 World Cup, the German national team became champions for the first time. This made Germany the first nation to win a world title in both men's and women's football. The World Cup should have taken place again at the People's Republic of China, but due to the SARS epidemic, the tournament was temporarily relocated to the United States. The German team kept a white vest during qualifying. All six games were won and only the Englishwoman Rachel Yankey could score a goal against the German team.

In the first round match the German team met Canada. The Canadians took the lead after a few minutes. Thereafter, the German team turned up and came to a 4-1 victory. It was followed by a 3-0 victory over Japan and at the conclusion of the preliminary round, a 6-1 victory against Argentina. In this game, Steffi Jones suffered an Anterior cruciate ligament injury and had to travel home.

As a group winner the Germans reached the quarterfinals. The Russians was sent home with a 7-1 score. Kerstin Garefrekes and Birgit Prinz scored two goals each. In the semifinals the opponent was called USA again. In a women's football game of all time, which was the best for many experts, the German team was able to successfully take revenge and moved into the final with a 3-0 victory. In the final, the German team met Sweden. This resulted in a new edition of the Euro 2001. Just before the half-time whistle, Hanna Ljungberg took the Trekroners into the lead. Not even a minute was played in the second half when Maren Meinert equalized. After regular time it was 1: 1, so that an extension was necessary. In the 98th minute, the German team received a free kick. Renate Lingor brought the leather into the box. Nia Künzer headed the ball over Swedish keeper Caroline Jönsson. With this Golden Goal Germany was world champion.

=== Group C ===
Pos	Team	Pld	W	D	L	GF	GA	GD	Pts	Qualification
1	Germany	3	3	0	0	13	2	+11	9	Advance to knockout stage
2	Canada	3	2	0	1	7	5	+2	6	Advance to knockout stage
3	Japan	3	1	0	2	7	6	+1	3	
4	Argentina	3	0	0	3	1	15	−14	0	

Source: FIFA
September 20, 2003
17:45 EDT (UTC−4)

Germany	4–1	Canada
Wiegmann 39' (pen.); Gottschlich 47'; Prinz 75'; Garefrekes 90+2'	Report	Sinclair 4'

Columbus Crew Stadium, Columbus
Attendance: 16,409
Referee: Im Eun-ju (South Korea)

September 24, 2003
17:45 EDT (UTC−4)

Germany	3–0	Japan
Minnert 23'; Prinz 36', 66'	Report

Columbus Crew Stadium, Columbus
Attendance: 15,529
Referee: Sueli Tortura (Brazil)

September 27, 2003
15:30 EDT (UTC−4)

Argentina	1–6	Germany
Gaitán 71'	Report	Meinert 3', 43'; Wiegmann 24' (pen.); Prinz 32'; Pohlers 89'; Müller 90+2'

Robert F. Kennedy Memorial Stadium, Washington, D.C.
Attendance: 17,618
Referee: Bola Elizabeth Abidoye (Nigeria)

=== Quarter-finals ===
October 2, 2003
16:30 PDT (UTC−7)

Germany	7–1	Russia
Müller 25'; Minnert 57'; Wunderlich 60'; Garefrekes 62', 85'; Prinz 80', 89'	Report	Danilova 70'

PGE Park, Portland
Attendance: 20,012
Referee: Im Eun-ju (South Korea)

=== Semi-finals ===
October 5, 2003
16:30 PDT (UTC−7)

United States	0–3	Germany
	Report	Garefrekes 15'; Meinert 90+1'; Prinz 90+3'

PGE Park, Portland
Attendance: 27,623
Referee: Sonia Denoncourt (Canada)

=== Final ===
October 12, 2003
10:00 am PDT (UTC−7)

Germany	2–1 (a.e.t./g.g.)	Sweden
Meinert 46'; Künzer 98'	Report	Ljungberg 41'

Home Depot Center, Carson
Attendance: 26,137
Referee: Cristina Ionescu (Romania)

== 2007 World Cup ==
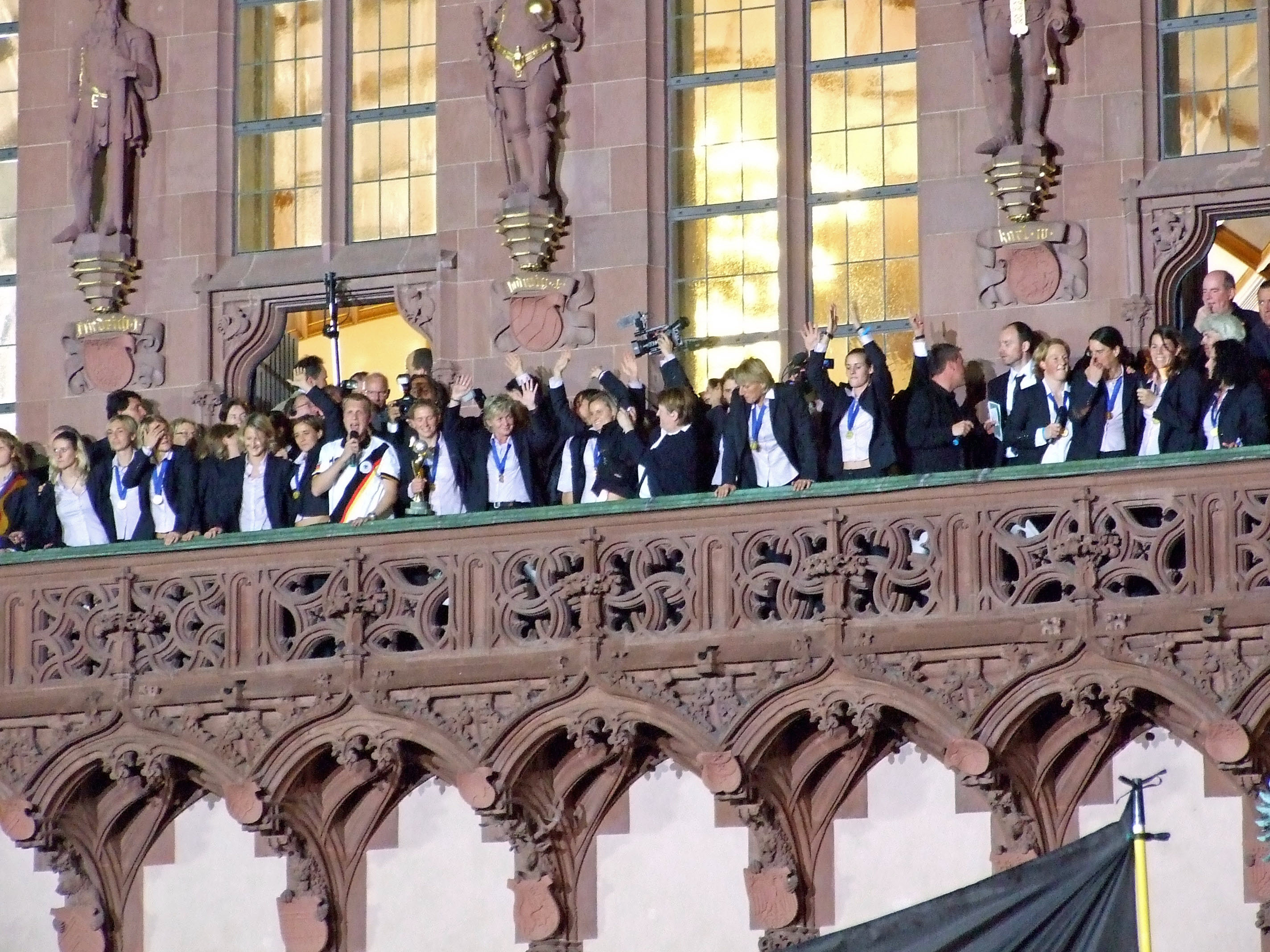
Reception on the Römerbalkon after winning the title at the World Cup 2007

In qualifying, the German team could win all the games and qualify so confidently for the World Cup in China. For the first time the team received a bonus for the successful qualification. A total of 200,000 euros were distributed by the DFB. The World Cup, in which the German team met in the preliminary round on Argentina, England and Japan, was then for the German team to the tournament of superlatives, because they set the following records:

- Longest series without defeat (women): 12 games (six in 2003 and 2007), previously USA 11 games (1995 (match for third place), 1999 (6) and 2003 (4))
- Longest series without conceding (men and women): 6 games (2007), previously Italy 5 games in men (World Cup 1990) and Germany (1991), Norway (1995), Sweden (1991), USA (1991 and 2003) and PR China (1999) with 3 games each for women.
- Highest world championship victory (men and women) of all time: With the 11: 0 in the opening match against Argentina, both the previous records of women (Japan-Sweden 0: 8, 1991 FIFA Women's World Cup and Norway-Nigeria 8: 0 1995 FIFA Women's World Cup) as well as the men's record (Hungary-El Salvador 10: 1 1982 FIFA World Cup)) outbid. It is also the top scoring opening game (men and women) of all time.
- First title defense of a women's world champion
- First title win (women and men) without conceding
- Birgit Prinz is the women's World Cup record scorer with 14 goals in total (previously Michelle Akers / USA with 12 goals).
- Silvia Neid succeeded as the first national coach (women and men) to win the title in their first World Cup.

After winning the record for the opening match against Argentina, the team had to content themselves with a goalless draw against England, but by a 2-0 win over Japan, the team could qualify for the quarter-final against North Korea which she won 3-0. The semi-final against Norway was won 3-0. In the final against Brazil then faced two equal teams, with the Brazilians with Marta and Cristiane had the better single players, but the German team was occupied more homogeneous and so ultimately the final could win 2-0.

=== Group A ===
Pos	Team	Pld	W	D	L	GF	GA	GD	Pts	Qualification
1	Germany	3	2	1	0	13	0	+13	7	Advance to knockout stage
2	England	3	1	2	0	8	3	+5	5	Advance to knockout stage
3	Japan	3	1	1	1	3	4	−1	4	
4	Argentina	3	0	0	3	1	18	−17	0	

Source: FIFA
10 September 2007
20:00

Germany	11–0	Argentina
Behringer 12', 24'; Garefrekes 17'; Prinz 29', 45+1', 59'; Lingor 51', 90+1'; Smisek 57', 70', 79'	Report

Hongkou Football Stadium, Shanghai
Attendance: 28,098
Referee: Tammy Ogston (Australia)

14 September 2007
20:00

England	0–0	Germany
	Report

Hongkou Football Stadium, Shanghai
Attendance: 27,730
Referee: Jenny Palmqvist (Sweden)

17 September 2007
20:00

Germany	2–0	Japan
Prinz 21'; Lingor 87' (pen.)	Report

Yellow Dragon Stadium, Hangzhou
Attendance: 39,817
Referee: Adriana Correa (Colombia)

=== Quarter-finals ===
22 September 2007
17:00

Germany	3–0	North Korea
Garefrekes 44'; Lingor 67'; Krahn 72'	Report

Wuhan Sports Centre Stadium, Wuhan
Attendance: 37,200
Referee: Tammy Ogston (Australia)

=== Semi-finals ===
26 September 2007
20:00

Germany	3–0	Norway
Rønning 42' (o.g.); Stegemann 72'; Müller 75'	Report

Tianjin Olympic Center Stadium, Tianjin
Attendance: 53,819
Referee: Dagmar Damková (Czech Republic)

=== Final ===
30 September 2007
20:00

Germany	2–0	Brazil
Prinz 52'; Laudehr 86'	Report

Hongkou Football Stadium, Shanghai
Attendance: 31,000
Referee: Tammy Ogston (Australia)

== 2011 World Cup ==
At the home World Cup Germany wanted to be the first country to win the title for the third time in a row. The Bundesliga season was ended in mid-March, the cup final held in late March. The initially 26-member squad met for seven courses between which four friendly matches against teams with similar playing styles as the group opponents took place. In the process, Silvia Neid changed her starting line-up again and again, especially during the attack, and also up to six players during the matches. All friendly matches were won without conceding and scored 15 goals. Five of them scored U-20 World Cup top scorer Alexandra Popp. Nevertheless, she came in the World Cup matches only as a substitute used and remained without scoring.

In the opening match Germany started with a 2-1 victory over Canada. This was followed by a hard-fought 1-0 against African champions Nigeria. After these two victories, the quarter-finals were fixed. In both games, record national player and captain Birgit Prinz was replaced. In the final group match against France and also in the quarter-final, she did not come to use. If the German team in the match against France could significantly increase and defeat the previously also twice victorious French with 4-2, so had to accept the first defeat against Japan after 15 World Cup games without defeat and for the second time after 1999 after the quarter-finals to pack the bags. It was the fourth defeat in a World Cup - knockout-round against the eventual champion.

After the departure, Bernd Schröder in particular criticized the too long preparation time as well as the tactics. For Schröder, the long preparation time also had the disadvantage that the national team of 1. FFC Turbine Potsdam were not available to prepare for Champions League Final, which lost to Potsdam 2-0 at the end of May against Olympique Lyon ,

Birgit Prinz and Ariane Hingst, both of whom had played for Germany for more than 14 years, announced their retirement from the national team immediately after their defeat by Japan, but the DFB announced a farewell match that would not have been possible for Birgit Prinz on 27 March 2012 took place. Silvia Neid initially did not want to comment on her future in a few weeks. But on 13 July, the national coach announced that she wanted to fulfill her contract, which had been extended until the 2016 World Cup, and would like to build a new team for the European Championship 2013. With this, the European title could be defended.

With the defeat and the simultaneous semi-final entry of France and Sweden also for the first time the qualification for the Olympic women's tournament missed.

On 23 and 29 August 2011, Ursula Holl and Kerstin Garefrekes also announced their departure from the national team.

After the quarter-final against Japan, the team remained unbeaten in 22 games successively and lost only in the final of 2013 Algarve Cup against the United States.

=== Group A ===
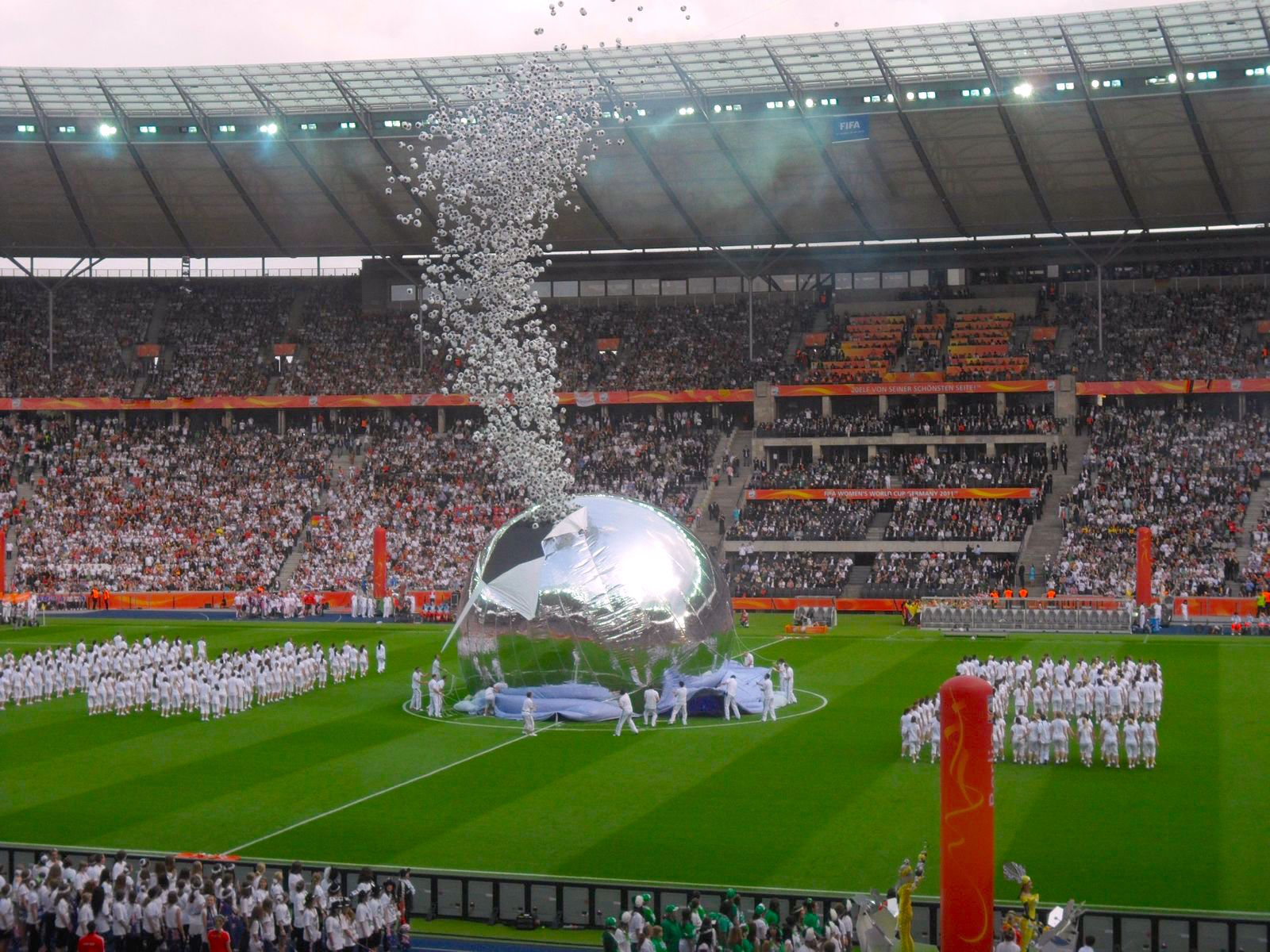
Opening ceremony.

Pos	Team	Pld	W	D	L	GF	GA	GD	Pts	Qualification
1	Germany (H)	3	3	0	0	7	3	+4	9	Advance to knockout stage
2	France	3	2	0	1	7	4	+3	6	Advance to knockout stage
3	Nigeria	3	1	0	2	1	2	−1	3	
4	Canada	3	0	0	3	1	7	−6	0	

Source: FIFA
(H) Hosts
26 June 2011
18:00

Germany	2–1	Canada
Garefrekes 10'; Okoyino da Mbabi 42'	Report	Sinclair 82'

Olympiastadion, Berlin
Attendance: 73,680
Referee: Jacqui Melksham (Australia)

30 June 2011
20:45

Germany	1–0	Nigeria
Laudehr 54'	Report

Waldstadion, Frankfurt
Attendance: 48,817
Referee: Cha Sung-mi (South Korea)

5 July 2011
20:45

France	2–4	Germany
Delie 56'; Georges 72'	Report	Garefrekes 25'; Grings 32', 68' (pen.); Okoyino da Mbabi 89'

Borussia-Park, Mönchengladbach
Attendance: 45,867
Referee: Kirsi Heikkinen (Finland)

=== Quarter-finals ===
9 July 2011
20:45

Germany	0–1 (a.e.t.)	Japan
	Report	Maruyama 108'

Volkswagen Arena, Wolfsburg
Attendance: 26,067
Referee: Quetzalli Alvarado (Mexico)

== 2015 World Cup ==
In the Qualification, which started in the autumn of 2013 after the European Championships in Sweden, the team met Russia, Ireland, the Slovakia, Slovenia and Croatia. Except for Slovenia, the German team had previously played against all other group opponents and also lost no game against them, with only Russia could score goals against the German team. Most recently, Germany, the most frequent opponent of the Russian team, met Russia in a friendly for the 2009 European Championship in August 2009 and won 3-1 in Bochum. Two matches against Slovakia were played in the qualifiers for the 1997 European Championships in 1995 and 1996, Croatia were opponents in qualifying for the 1995 European Championship and against Ireland, the team played twice in qualifying for the 2007 World Cup. Apart from Russia, none of the group opponents could qualify for a World Cup or European Championship finals.

The German team met Russia in the first match on 21 September 2013 and inflicted the highest defeat on Russia at 9: 0, which was decisive that Russia missed the playoff games of the best runners-up in the end. Then came on 26 October for the first time encounter with Slovenia, the German team with the 13: 0 in Slovenia, the highest victory in a World Cup qualifying and the highest away win succeeded. The following games were won without conceding, so that the German team went with five wins and 40: 0 goals in the winter break. The qualification was continued on April 5, 2014 with the game in Ireland, with the German team had to accept the first goals in a 3-2 victory. For the German team ended the qualification on September 17, 2014 with a 2-0 win in the home game against Ireland. Germany won all 10 games and qualified prematurely on September 13 for the World Cup.

As the World Cup in Canada is to be played on artificial turf, against which several players have spoken out, the German team played on October 29, 2014 in the Behrn Arena in Örebro against Sweden a test match on artificial turf, which was won 2-1. Previously a friendly match against France was lost 2-0 at Offenbach am Main and then at London on 23 November Wembley Stadium against England 3-0 win.

In the group draw in Ottawa, Canada, on December 6, 2014, Germany, previously group head of Group B, was scored as an opponent: Ivory Coast, Norway and Thailand.

Germany put in the first game against Ivory Coast with a 10: 0, the second highest World Cup victory a sign. They dominated the first half of the final against Norway, but only scored one goal and had to equalize in the second half. Also against physically inferior Thai women they were the game-determining team, but could only score four goals. Nevertheless, they were group winners with the better goal difference, as Norway had won with the same result against Thailand, against the Ivory Coast, only a 3-1 reached. Sweden were defeated 4-1 in the round of 16, with the Swedish goalkeeper still their best player. In the quarter-final against strong French women, the DFB-Elf could prevail only in the penalty shoot-out, against the US was then in the semi-final, the marksmanship away from the penalty spot, so that the game was lost 0: 2. In the small final was then lost for the first time against England, which had never been beyond the quarter-finals.

=== Group B ===
Pos	Team	Pld	W	D	L	GF	GA	GD	Pts	Qualification
1	Germany	3	2	1	0	15	1	+14	7	Advance to knockout stage
2	Norway	3	2	1	0	8	2	+6	7	Advance to knockout stage
3	Thailand	3	1	0	2	3	10	−7	3	
4	Ivory Coast	3	0	0	3	3	16	−13	0	

Source: FIFA
7 June 2015
16:00 EDT (UTC−4)

Germany	10–0	Ivory Coast
Šašić 3', 14', 31'; Mittag 29', 35', 64'; Laudehr 71'; Däbritz 75'; Behringer 79'; Popp 85'	Report

TD Place Stadium, Ottawa
Attendance: 20,953
Referee: Carol Anne Chenard (Canada)

11 June 2015
16:00 EDT (UTC−4)

Germany	1–1	Norway
Mittag 6'	Report	Mjelde 61'

TD Place Stadium, Ottawa
Attendance: 18,987
Referee: Teodora Albon (Romania)

15 June 2015
15:00 CDT (UTC−5)

Thailand	0–4	Germany
	Report	Leupolz 24'; Petermann 56', 58'; Däbritz 73'

Investors Group Field, Winnipeg
Attendance: 26,191
Referee: Gladys Lengwe (Zambia)

=== Round of 16 ===
20 June 2015
16:00 EDT (UTC−4)

Germany	4–1	Sweden
Mittag 24'; Šašić 36' (pen.), 78'; Marozsán 88'	Report	Sembrant 82'

TD Place Stadium, Ottawa
Attendance: 22,486
Referee: Ri Hyang-ok (North Korea)

=== Quarter-finals ===
26 June 2015
16:00 EDT (UTC−4)

Germany	1–1 (a.e.t.)	France
Šašić 84' (pen.)	Report	Nécib 64'
Penalties
Behringer (penalty scored); Laudehr (penalty scored); Peter (penalty scored); Marozsán (penalty scored); Šašić (penalty scored)	5–4	(penalty scored) Thiney; (penalty scored) Abily; (penalty scored) Nécib; (penalty scored) Renard; (penalty missed) Lavogez

Olympic Stadium, Montreal
Attendance: 24,859
Referee: Carol Anne Chenard (Canada)

=== Semi-finals ===
30 June 2015
19:00 EDT (UTC−4)

United States	2–0	Germany
Lloyd 69' (pen.); O'Hara 84'	Report

Olympic Stadium, Montreal
Attendance: 51,176
Referee: Teodora Albon (Romania)

=== Third place play-off ===
4 July 2015
14:00 MDT (UTC−6)

Germany	0–1 (a.e.t.)	England
	Report	Williams 108' (pen.)

Commonwealth Stadium, Edmonton
Attendance: 21,483
Referee: Ri Hyang-ok (North Korea)

== 2019 World Cup ==
In the Qualification, which began in the autumn of 2017 after the European Championships in the Netherlands, the team met Iceland, Czech Republic, for the first time the Faroe Islands and Slovenia. The German team, who were eliminated for the first time at the European Championships in the quarter-finals and then Anja Mittag had announced her resignation, met in the first game on Slovenia and won 6-0. Simone Laudehr, who could not play a year due to injury, made her 100th international appearance. Three days later, in the Czech Republic, it was only a painful 1-0 victory, favored by an own goal from a Czech player. In the third game, the team lost 2: 3 and thus for the first time after 14 victorious games against Iceland and for the first time a home game in the World Cup qualifiers. The team fell back in the table in third place, but the top spot four days later by a 11-0 draw against the Faroe Islands, in which Hasret Kayikçi scored the last four goals, with simultaneous division of points between Iceland and the Czech Republic to recapture. One week after the team was without a win at the 2018 SheBelieves Cup and came in last, Germany coach Steffi Jones was dismissed.

Horst Hrubesch took over the office of women's federal coach, but his mission was extended after Martina Voss-Tecklenburg, currently coach of Switzerland, agreed that she would leave office after completing the World Cup qualification takes over. Under Hrubesch the remaining four qualifiers were won without conceding, including 2: 0 the return leg in Iceland. They had won against Iceland direct comparison due to the more goals scored and since the Icelandic women could not win the second game against the Czech Republic, Germany was group winner and Iceland also missed the playoff games of the best runners-up for the last European World Cup starting place.

At the World Cup finals, China and Spain as well as South Africa were the opponents of the group stage. With three wins without conceding the round of 16 was achieved. Here Africa champion Nigeria was beaten 3-0. In the quarterfinals after 24 years again a competitive match against Sweden was lost. Although Lina Magull gave the German team the lead in the 16th minute, it only lasted six minutes. Shortly after the half-time break, the Swedes could use a defensive weakness of the German team and achieve the winning goal.

=== Group B ===
Pos	Team	Pld	W	D	L	GF	GA	GD	Pts	Qualification
1	Germany	3	3	0	0	6	0	+6	9	Advance to knockout stage
2	Spain	3	1	1	1	3	2	+1	4	Advance to knockout stage
3	China	3	1	1	1	1	1	0	4	Advance to knockout stage
4	South Africa	3	0	0	3	1	8	−7	0	

Source: FIFA
8 June 2019
15:00

Germany	1–0	China
Gwinn 66'	Report

Roazhon Park, Rennes
Attendance: 15,283
Referee: Marie-Soleil Beaudoin (Canada)

12 June 2019
18:00

Germany	1–0	Spain
Däbritz 42'	Report

Stade du Hainaut, Valenciennes
Attendance: 20,761
Referee: Kateryna Monzul (Ukraine)

17 June 2019
18:00

South Africa	0–4	Germany
	Report	Leupolz 14'; Däbritz 29'; Popp 40'; Magull 58'

Stade de la Mosson, Montpellier
Attendance: 15,502
Referee: Sandra Braz (Portugal)

=== Round of 16 ===
22 June 2019
17:30

Germany	3–0	Nigeria
Popp 20'; Däbritz 27' (pen.); Schüller 82'	Report

Stade des Alpes, Grenoble
Attendance: 17,988
Referee: Yoshimi Yamashita (Japan)

=== Quarter-finals ===
29 June 2019
18:30

Germany	1–2	Sweden
Magull 16'	Report	Jakobsson 22'; Blackstenius 48'

Roazhon Park, Rennes
Attendance: 25,301
Referee: Stéphanie Frappart (France)

== 2023 World Cup ==
=== Group H ===
Pos	Team	Pld	W	D	L	GF	GA	GD	Pts	Qualification
1	Colombia	3	2	0	1	4	2	+2	6	Advance to knockout stage
2	Morocco	3	2	0	1	2	6	−4	6	Advance to knockout stage
3	Germany	3	1	1	1	8	3	+5	4	
4	South Korea	3	0	1	2	1	4	−3	1	

Source: FIFA
Rules for classification: Group stage tiebreakers
24 July 2023
18:30 UTC+10

Germany	6–0	Morocco
Popp 11', 39'; Bühl 46'; Aït El Haj 54' (o.g.); Redouani 79' (o.g.); Schüller 90'	Report

Melbourne Rectangular Stadium, Melbourne
Attendance: 27,256
Referee: Tori Penso (United States)

30 July 2023
19:30 UTC+10

Germany	1–2	Colombia
Popp 89' (pen.)	Report	Caicedo 52'; Vanegas 90+7'

Sydney Football Stadium, Sydney
Attendance: 40,499
Referee: Melissa Borjas (Honduras)

3 August 2023
20:00 UTC+10

South Korea	1–1	Germany
Cho So-hyun 6'	Report	Popp 42'

Lang Park, Brisbane
Attendance: 38,945
Referee: Anna-Marie Keighley (New Zealand)

== 2027 World Cup ==
Qualified.

== FIFA World Cup record ==
Year	Result	Matches	Wins	Draws*	Losses	GF	GA
(China) 1991	Fourth place	6	4	0	2	13	10
(Sweden) 1995	Runners-up	6	4	0	2	13	6
(United States) 1999	Quarter-finals	4	1	2	1	12	7
(United States) 2003	Champions	6	6	0	0	25	4
(China) 2007	Champions	6	5	1	0	21	0
(Germany) 2011	Quarter-finals	4	3	0	1	7	4
(Canada) 2015	Fourth place	7	3	2	2	20	6
(France) 2019	Quarter-finals	5	4	0	1	10	2
(Australia) (New Zealand) 2023	Group stage	3	1	1	1	8	3
(Brazil) 2027	Qualified						
(Costa Rica) (Jamaica) (Mexico) (United States) 2031	To be determined						
(United Kingdom) 2035	To be determined						
Total	10/10	47	31	6*	10	129	42

*Denotes draws including knockout matches decided on penalty kicks.
**Gold background colour indicates that the tournament was won.
***Red border color indicates tournament was held on home soil.

Germany's Women's World Cup record
First Match	Germany 4–0 Nigeria (17 November 1991; Jiangmen, China)
Biggest Win	Germany 11–0 Argentina (10 September 2007; Shanghai, China)
Biggest Defeat	Sweden 4–0 Germany (29 November 1991; Guangzhou, China)
Best Result	Champions in 2003 and 2007
Worst Result	Group stage 2023

== Head-to-head record ==
Opponent	Pld	W	D	L	GF	GA	GD	Win %
Argentina	2	2	0	0	17	1	+16	100.00
Brazil	3	2	1	0	11	4	+7	66.67
Canada	2	2	0	0	6	2	+4	100.00
China	2	2	0	0	2	0	+2	100.00
Chinese Taipei	1	1	0	0	3	0	+3	100.00
Colombia	1	0	0	1	1	2	−1	0.00
Denmark	1	1	0	0	2	1	+1	100.00
England	3	1	1	1	3	1	+2	33.33
France	2	1	1	0	5	3	+2	50.00
Italy	2	1	1	0	3	1	+2	50.00
Ivory Coast	1	1	0	0	10	0	+10	100.00
Japan	4	3	0	1	6	1	+5	75.00
Mexico	1	1	0	0	6	0	+6	100.00
Morocco	1	1	0	0	6	0	+6	100.00
Nigeria	3	3	0	0	8	0	+8	100.00
North Korea	1	1	0	0	3	0	+3	100.00
Norway	3	1	1	1	4	3	+1	33.33
Russia	1	1	0	0	7	1	+6	100.00
South Africa	1	1	0	0	4	0	+4	100.00
South Korea	1	0	1	0	1	1	+0	0.00
Spain	1	1	0	0	1	0	+1	100.00
Sweden	5	2	0	3	9	11	−2	40.00
Thailand	1	1	0	0	4	0	+4	100.00
United States	4	1	0	3	7	10	−3	25.00
Total	47	31	6	10	129	42	+87	65.96

== Goalscorers ==
Player	Goals	1991	1995	1999	2003	2007	2011	2015	2019	2023	2023
Birgit Prinz	14		1	1	7	5					
Bettina Wiegmann	11	3	3	3	2						
Heidi Mohr	10	7	3								
Kerstin Garefrekes	8				4	2	2				
Célia Šašić	8						2	6			
Alexandra Popp	7							1	2	4	
Maren Meinert	6		2		4						
Inka Grings	5			3			2				
Renate Lingor	5			1		4					
Anja Mittag	5							5			
Sara Däbritz	5							2	3		
Sandra Smisek	4			1		3					
Melanie Behringer	3					2		1			
Simone Laudehr	3					1	1	1			
Martina Müller	3				2	1					
Sandra Minnert	2				2						
Silvia Neid	2	1	1								
Lena Petermann	2							2			
Melanie Leupolz	2							1	1		
Lina Magull	2								2		
Lea Schüller	2								1	1	
Anouschka Bernhard	1		1								
Gudrun Gottschlich	1	1									
Stefanie Gottschlich	1				1						
Ariane Hingst	1			1							
Steffi Jones	1			1							
Annike Krahn	1					1					
Nia Künzer	1				1						
Ursula Lohn	1		1								
Dzsenifer Marozsán	1							1			
Conny Pohlers	1				1						
Giulia Gwinn	1								1		
Kerstin Stegemann	1					1					
Britta Unsleber	1	1									
Martina Voss	1		1								
Pia Wunderlich	1				1						
Klara Bühl	1									1	
Own goals	2			1		1				2	
Total	129	13	13	12	25	21	7	20	10	8	

== See also ==
- Germany at the UEFA Women's Championship
