= Argentina at the FIFA Women's World Cup =

Argentina women's national football team's record at the FIFA Women's World Cup

The Argentina women's national football team has represented Argentina at the FIFA Women's World Cup at four stagings of the tournament, in 2003, 2007, 2019 and 2023.

== FIFA Women's World Cup record ==
FIFA Women's World Cup finals record									Qualification record					
Year	Round	Position	Pld	W	D*	L	GF	GA	Pld	W	D	L	GF	GA
(China) 1991	Did not enter								Declined participation					
(Sweden) 1995	Did not qualify								5	3	0	2	18	11
(United States) 1999	Did not qualify								8	4	1	3	21	15
(United States) 2003	Group stage	16th	3	0	0	3	1	15	5	3	1	1	17	6
(China) 2007	Group stage	16th	3	0	0	3	1	18	7	6	1	0	21	1
(Germany) 2011	Did not qualify								7	3	1	3	7	7
(Canada) 2015	Did not qualify								7	3	1	3	11	10
(France) 2019	Group stage	18th	3	0	2	1	3	4	9	5	1	3	20	15
(Australia) (New Zealand) 2023	Group stage	27th	3	0	1	2	2	5	6	4	0	2	13	6
(Brazil) 2027	Qualified								To be determined					
(Costa Rica) (Jamaica) (Mexico) (United States) 2031	To be determined								To be determined					
(United Kingdom) 2035	To be determined								To be determined					
Total	Group stage	5/10	12	0	3	9	7	42	54	31	6	17	128	71

Argentina's Women's World Cup record
First Match	Japan 6–0 Argentina (20 September 2003; Columbus, United States)
Biggest Win	—
Biggest Defeat	Germany 11–0 Argentina (10 September 2007; Shanghai, China)
Best Result	Group stage in 2003, 2007, 2019 and 2023

=== All matches ===
World Cup	Round	Opponent	Score	Venue	Argentina scorers
2003	Group stage	Japan	0–6	Columbus Crew Stadium, Columbus	
2003	Group stage	Canada	0–3	Columbus Crew Stadium, Columbus	
2003	Group stage	Germany	1–6	RFK Stadium, Washington, D.C.	Gaitán
2007	Group stage	Germany	0–11	Hongkou Stadium, Shanghai	
2007	Group stage	Japan	0–1	Hongkou Stadium, Shanghai	
2007	Group stage	England	1–6	Chengdu Sports Center, Chengdu	González
2019	Group stage	Japan	0–0	Parc des Princes, Paris	
2019	Group stage	England	0–1	Stade Océane, Le Havre	
2019	Group stage	Scotland	3–3	Parc des Princes, Paris	Menéndez, Alexander (o.g.), Bonsegundo
2023	Group stage	Italy	0–1	Eden Park, Auckland	
2023	Group stage	South Africa	2–2	Forsyth Barr Stadium, Dunedin	Braun, Núñez
2023	Group stage	Sweden	0–2	Waikato Stadium, Hamilton	
2027	Group stage				

== Head-to-head record ==
Opponent	Pld	W	D	L	GF	GA	GD	Win %
Canada	1	0	0	1	0	3	−3	0.00
England	2	0	0	2	1	7	−6	0.00
Germany	2	0	0	2	1	17	−16	0.00
Italy	1	0	0	1	0	1	−1	0.00
Japan	3	0	1	2	0	7	−7	0.00
Scotland	1	0	1	0	3	3	+0	0.00
South Africa	1	0	1	0	2	2	+0	0.00
Sweden	1	0	0	1	0	2	−2	0.00
Total	12	0	3	9	7	42	−35	0.00

=== Record by confederation ===
Opponent	Pld	W	D	L	GF	GA	GD	Win %
AFC	3	0	1	2	0	7	−7	0.00
CAF	1	0	1	0	2	2	+0	0.00
CONCACAF	1	0	0	1	0	3	−3	0.00
UEFA	7	0	1	6	5	30	−25	0.00
Total	12	0	3	9	7	42	−35	0.00

== Head coaches ==
By tournament		At FIFA Women's World Cup						In qualification						Total					
Coach	Years	Pld	W	D	L	W %	Pts %	Pld	W	D	L	W %	Pts %	Pld	W	D	L	W %	Pts %
Rubén Torres	(Sweden) 1995	Did not qualify						5	3	0	2	60	60%	5	3	0	2	60%	60%
Raúl Rodríguez Seoane	(United States) 1999	Left before qualification ended						6	4	1	1	66.67%	72.22%	6	4	1	1	66.67%	72.22%
Carlos Borrello	(United States) 1999	Did not qualify						2	0	0	2	0%	0%	2	0	0	2	0%	0%
Carlos Borrello	(United States) 2003	3	0	0	3	0%	0%	5	3	1	1	60%	66.67%	8	3	1	4	37.5%	41.67%
Carlos Borrello	(China) 2007	3	0	0	3	0%	0%	7	6	1	0	85.67%	90.47%	10	6	1	3	60%	63.33%
Carlos Borrello	(Germany) 2011	Did not qualify						7	3	1	3	42.85%	47.61%	7	3	1	3	42.85%	47.61%
Carlos Borrello	(France) 2019	3	0	2	1	0%	0%	9	5	1	3	55.56%	59.25%	12	5	3	4	41.67%	50%
Luis Nicosia and Ezequiel Nicosia	(Canada) 2015	Did not qualify						7	3	1	3	42.85%	47.61%	7	3	1	3	42.85%	47.61%
Germán Portanova	(Australia) (New Zealand) 2023	3	0	1	2	0%	0%	6	4	0	2	66.67%	66.67%	9	4	1	4	44.44%	62.96%

== 2003 FIFA Women's World Cup ==
=== Group C ===
Pos	Team	Pld	W	D	L	GF	GA	GD	Pts	Qualification
1	Germany	3	3	0	0	13	2	+11	9	Advance to knockout stage
2	Canada	3	2	0	1	7	5	+2	6	Advance to knockout stage
3	Japan	3	1	0	2	7	6	+1	3	
4	Argentina	3	0	0	3	1	15	−14	0	

Source: FIFA
Rules for classification: Group stage tiebreakers
September 20, 2003
20:30 EDT (UTC−4)

Japan	6–0	Argentina
Sawa 13', 38'; Yamamoto 64'; Otani 72', 75', 80'	Report

Columbus Crew Stadium, Columbus
Attendance: 16,409
Referee: Katriina Elovirta (Finland)
September 24, 2003
20:30 EDT (UTC−4)

Canada	3–0	Argentina
Hooper 19' (pen.); Latham 79', 82'	Report

Columbus Crew Stadium, Columbus
Attendance: 15,529
Referee: Nicole Petignat (Switzerland)
September 27, 2003
15:30 EDT (UTC−4)

Argentina	1–6	Germany
Gaitán 71'	Report	Meinert 3', 43'; Wiegmann 24' (pen.); Prinz 32'; Pohlers 89'; Müller 90+2'

Robert F. Kennedy Memorial Stadium, Washington, D.C.
Attendance: 17,618
Referee: Bola Elizabeth Abidoye (Nigeria)

== 2007 FIFA Women's World Cup ==
=== Group A ===
Pos	Team	Pld	W	D	L	GF	GA	GD	Pts	Qualification
1	Germany	3	2	1	0	13	0	+13	7	Advance to knockout stage
2	England	3	1	2	0	8	3	+5	5	Advance to knockout stage
3	Japan	3	1	1	1	3	4	−1	4	
4	Argentina	3	0	0	3	1	18	−17	0	

Source: FIFA
Rules for classification: Group stage tiebreakers
10 September 2007
20:00

Germany	11–0	Argentina
Behringer 12', 24'; Garefrekes 17'; Prinz 29', 45+1', 59'; Lingor 51', 90+1'; Smisek 57', 70', 79'	Report

Hongkou Football Stadium, Shanghai
Attendance: 28,098
Referee: Tammy Ogston (Australia)
14 September 2007
17:00

Argentina	0–1	Japan
	Report	Nagasato 90+1'

Hongkou Football Stadium, Shanghai
Attendance: 27,730
Referee: Dagmar Damková (Czech Republic)
17 September 2007
20:00

England	6–1	Argentina
González 9' (o.g.); J. Scott 10'; Williams 50' (pen.); K. Smith 64', 77'; Exley 90' (pen.)	Report	González 60'

Chengdu Sports Centre Stadium, Chengdu
Attendance: 30,730
Referee: Dianne Ferreira-James (Guyana)

== 2019 FIFA Women's World Cup ==
=== Group D ===
Pos	Team	Pld	W	D	L	GF	GA	GD	Pts	Qualification
1	England	3	3	0	0	5	1	+4	9	Advance to knockout stage
2	Japan	3	1	1	1	2	3	−1	4	Advance to knockout stage
3	Argentina	3	0	2	1	3	4	−1	2	
4	Scotland	3	0	1	2	5	7	−2	1	

Source: FIFA
Rules for classification: Group stage tiebreakers
10 June 2019
18:00

Argentina	0–0	Japan
	Report

Parc des Princes, Paris
Attendance: 25,055
Referee: Stéphanie Frappart (France)
14 June 2019
21:00

England	1–0	Argentina
Taylor 62'	Report

Stade Océane, Le Havre
Attendance: 20,294
Referee: Qin Liang (China PR)
19 June 2019
21:00

Scotland	3–3	Argentina
Little 19'; Beattie 49'; Cuthbert 69'	Report	Menéndez 74'; Alexander 79' (o.g.); Bonsegundo 90+4' (pen.)

Parc des Princes, Paris
Attendance: 28,205
Referee: Ri Hyang-ok (North Korea)

== 2023 FIFA Women's World Cup ==
=== Group G ===
Pos	Team	Pld	W	D	L	GF	GA	GD	Pts	Qualification
1	Sweden	3	3	0	0	9	1	+8	9	Advance to knockout stage
2	South Africa	3	1	1	1	6	6	0	4	Advance to knockout stage
3	Italy	3	1	0	2	3	8	−5	3	
4	Argentina	3	0	1	2	2	5	−3	1	

Source: FIFA
Rules for classification: Group stage tiebreakers
24 July 2023
18:00 UTC+12

Italy	1–0	Argentina
Girelli 87'	Report

Eden Park, Auckland
Attendance: 30,889
Referee: Melissa Borjas (Honduras)

28 July 2023
12:00 UTC+12

Argentina	2–2	South Africa
Braun 74'; Núñez 79'	Report	Motlhalo 30'; Kgatlana 66'

Forsyth Barr Stadium, Dunedin
Attendance: 8,834
Referee: Anna-Marie Keighley (New Zealand)

2 August 2023
19:00 UTC+12

Argentina	0–2	Sweden
	Report	Blomqvist 66'; Rubensson 90' (pen.)

Waikato Stadium, Hamilton
Attendance: 17,907
Referee: Salima Mukansanga (Rwanda)

== Goalscorers ==
Player	Goals	2003	2007	2019	2023	2027
Yanina Gaitán	1	1				
Eva González	1		1			
Milagros Menéndez	1			1		
Florencia Bonsegundo	1			1		
Sophia Braun	1				1	
Romina Núñez	1				1	
Own goals	1			1		
Total	7	1	1	3	2	
