= Romina Ferro =

Argentine footballer (born 1980)

Personal information
- Full name: Romina Anabella Ferro
- Date of birth: 26 June 1980 (age 46)
- Place of birth: Buenos Aires, Argentina
- Height: 1.80 m (5 ft 11 in)
- Position: Goalkeeper

Senior career*
Years	Team	Apps	(Gls)
- Club Chicago
- River Plate
2005	Levante		
- Boca Juniors
2007	Oviedo Moderno	12	(0)

International career
2000–	Argentina		
- * Club domestic league appearances and goals

Romina Anabella Ferro (born 26 June 1980) is an Argentine football goalkeeper. She has played in her country as well as for Levante UD and Oviedo Moderno in Spain's Primera División.

She has been a member of the Argentina national team. She was the first-choice goalkeeper in the 2003 World Cup, playing all three games against Japan, Canada and Germany and in the 2006 South American Championship, which Argentina won. She started the 2007 World Cup as a reserve, but after a crushing defeat (0–11) against Germany, she played the other two games against Japan and England.
