= Noelia López (footballer) =

Argentine footballer

Personal information
- Date of birth: 29 July 1978 (age 48)
- Place of birth: Resistencia, Chaco, Argentina
- Position: Defender

Senior career*
Years	Team	Apps	(Gls)
1994–2004	River Plate		

International career^{‡}
1995–2003	Argentina	3	(0)
- * Club domestic league appearances and goals ‡ National team caps and goals as of 29 September 2003

Noelia López (born 29 July 1978) is an Argentine former footballer who played as a defender. She was a member of the Argentina women's national football team at the 2003 FIFA Women's World Cup.

== Honours ==
- Primera División A: 1994, 1995, 1996, 1997, 2002 Apertura, 2003 Clausura
