= Mariela Ricotti =

Argentine footballer

Personal information
- Full name: Mariela Alejandra Ricotti
- Date of birth: 2 April 1979 (age 47)
- Position: Defender

Senior career*
Years	Team	Apps	(Gls)
- Boca Juniors

International career
	Argentina	2	(0)
- * Club domestic league appearances and goals

Mariela Alejandra Ricotti (born 2 April 1979) is an Argentine former footballer who played as a defender. She is a member of the Argentina national team. She was part of the team at the 2003 FIFA Women's World Cup. On club level she plays for Boca Juniors in Argentina.
