= Karina Alvariza =

Argentine footballer

Personal information
- Date of birth: 11 April 1976 (age 50)
- Height: 1.57 m (5 ft 2 in)
- Position: Forward

Senior career*
Years	Team	Apps	(Gls)
- Boca Juniors

International career
	Argentina	3	(0)
- * Club domestic league appearances and goals

Karina Alvariza (born 11 April 1976) is an Argentine former footballer who played as a forward. She is a former member of the Argentina national team. She was part of the team at the 2003 FIFA Women's World Cup. On club level she plays for Boca Juniors in Argentina.
