= Liu Hsiu-mei =

Chinese football player and referee from Taiwan

- Full name: Liu Hsiu-mei
- Born: 28 November 1972 (age 53); Taiwan

Domestic
Years	League	Role

International
Years	League	Role
2001–	FIFA-listed	Assistant referee

Liu Hsiu-mei (Chinese: 劉秀美; born 28 November 1972) is a Taiwanese football referee and former player. She was the winner of AFC Assistant Referee of the Year in 2007.

Liu was part of Chinese Taipei squad in the 1991 FIFA Women's World Cup. After retiring from player career, she qualified as international football assistant referee in 2001 and has participated in several international tournaments, such as FIFA Women's World Cup (2003 and 2007), AFC Women's Asian Cup (2006 and 2010), Asian Games (2002 and 2006) and the Summer Olympics (2008).
