= Andrea Gonsebate =

Argentine footballer

Personal information
- Full name: Andrea Ruth Gonsebate
- Date of birth: 7 May 1977 (age 49)
- Position: Defender

International career^{‡}
Years	Team	Apps	(Gls)
	Argentina	3	(0)
- ‡ National team caps and goals as of 29 September 2003

Andrea Ruth Gonsebate (born 7 May 1977) is an Argentine women's international footballer who plays as a defender. She is a member of the Argentina women's national football team. She was part of the team at the 2003 FIFA Women's World Cup.
