= Carlos Borrello =

Argentine football manager and coach

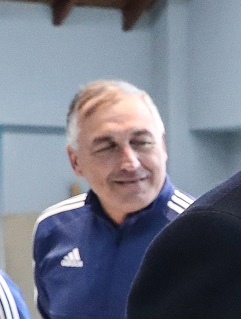
- Borrello in 2019

Personal information
- Full name: José Carlos Borrello
- Date of birth: 12 September 1955 (age 71)
- Place of birth: Argentina

Managerial career
- Years: Team
- 1996–1997: San Martín de Burzaco
- 1997: Argentina women (assistant)
- 1998–2012: Argentina women
- –2012: Argentina U-20 women
- –2012: Argentina U-17 women
- 2014–2017: UAI Urquiza women
- 2017–2021: Argentina women
- 2017–2020: Argentina U-20 women
- 2017–2018: Argentina U-17 women

José Carlos Borrello (born 12 September 1955) is an Argentine football manager. During his tenure as the manager from 1998 to 2012 and since 2017, he has helped women's teams qualify to all three of their Women's World Cups, all three of their Under-20 World Cups and their only Olympic tournament.

== Career ==
Borrello began coaching university teams between 1994 and 1995, before managing San Martín de Burzaco from 1996 to 1997. In 1997, he became an assistant coach for the Argentina women's national team. In June 1998, he became the head coach and technical director of the Argentina women's national teams. He helped the senior team qualify for their first FIFA Women's World Cup in 2003. Three years later, he led the team to their first major title, winning the 2006 South American Women's Football Championship as hosts. The success meant Argentina qualified for the 2007 FIFA Women's World Cup, as well as the 2008 Summer Olympics, the first Olympic appearance for the women's team. Borrello also coached the youth women's national teams, managing to qualify for the FIFA U-20 Women's World Cup in 2006, 2008 and 2012. He remained in the position until October 2012.

Later, he began managing the women's team of UAI Urquiza until 2017. In July 2017, he returned to his position as technical director of the women's national teams. Borrello led the team to a third-place finish at the 2018 Copa América Femenina, with Argentina advancing to an intercontinental play-off against Panama. Argentina won 5–1 on aggregate to qualify for the 2019 FIFA Women's World Cup in France after a twelve-year absence.

== Controversy ==
After the 2019 FIFA Women's World Cup, Borrello's coaching abilities were publicly criticized by Argentine international players Estefanía Banini, Florencia Bonsegundo, Ruth Bravo and Belén Potassa, who consequently made the decision to retire from international football as long as he did not resign from his position as coach.

== Honours ==
Argentina Women

- Copa América Femenina winners: 2006
