= Sharolta Nonen =

Canadian coach and former soccer player

Personal information
- Full name: Sharolta Louisa Nonen
- Date of birth: December 30, 1977 (age 48)
- Place of birth: Vancouver, British Columbia, Canada
- Height: 5 ft 6 in (1.68 m)
- Position: Defender

College career
Years	Team	Apps	(Gls)
1996–1999	Nebraska Cornhuskers	93	(9)

Senior career*
Years	Team	Apps	(Gls)
2001–2003	Atlanta Beat	67	(0)
2005–2008	Atlanta Silverbacks	22	(1)
2009	F.C. Indiana	10	(0)
2009	Los Angeles Sol	2	(0)
2010	Atlanta Beat	0	(0)
Total		101	(1)

International career^{‡}
1999–2006	Canada	63	(1)

Managerial career
- 2013–2015: Georgia Gwinnett College Grizzlies (assistant)
- 2015–2017: East Carolina Pirates (assistant)
- 2017–: FIU Panthers
- * Club domestic league appearances and goals as of September 25, 2009 ‡ National team caps and goals as of September 25, 2009

Sharolta Louisa Nonen (born December 30, 1977) is a Canadian former soccer defender and current women's soccer coach of the Florida International University Panthers. She played for the Nebraska Cornhuskers in college, where she was the first three-time All-American and the first Big 12 Player of the Year in program history. With the Atlanta Beat in the Women's United Soccer Association, Nonen was an All-Star with and named Top 3 defenders in the WUSA, All Star Player for Fortuna Hjørring (Danish League) and led the team to its first First place finish in over 10 years, Atlanta Silverbacks she was the First Player coach in Silverbacks semi-professional history and she led the team to one of its highest finishes ever, she was an All Star at FC Indiana (W-League) and with Los Angeles Sol (WPS) was a part of the National Championship team in 2009.

She was a member of the Canadian National Team, taking part in the 1999 and 2003 World Cups where she was named to the All-Tournament team in both appearances (Top 11 Players in Women's World Cup). She was also named twice as a starter to lead the back line in the All-World Team games 2001 & 2003.

Since retiring, Nonen has coached in the Youth, Olympic, Regional, National, Semi-Professional and Collegiate ranks.

== International career ==
In August 2006 Charmaine Hooper and Christine Latham refused to attend two exhibition games against China and fell into dispute with team coach Even Pellerud. Nonen joined Hooper and Latham in publicly calling for Pellerud's removal. Pellerud had pressured them to break their club contracts in order to join Vancouver Whitecaps and had tried to fix the outcome of a USL W-League play-off by releasing certain national team players but not others. Pellerud was abusive towards players and forced players to play through significant injuries or risk losing their funding. The players boycotted the 2007 World Cup and demanded fair and safe conditions for themselves and their teammates."
