= Christine Latham =

Canadian soccer player

Personal information
- Full name: Christine Elizabeth Latham
- Date of birth: 15 September 1981 (age 45)
- Place of birth: Calgary, Alberta, Canada
- Height: 5 ft 8 in (1.73 m)
- Position: Forward

College career
Years	Team	Apps	(Gls)
1999–2002	Nebraska Cornhuskers	94	(69)

Senior career*
Years	Team	Apps	(Gls)
2003	San Diego Spirit	19	(6)
2005	New Jersey Wildcats	4	(4)
2006–2008	Atlanta Silverbacks	28	(22)
2009	Boston Breakers	16	(2)

International career
2000–2006	Canada	49	(15)
- * Club domestic league appearances and goals

Christine Elizabeth Latham (born 15 September 1981) is a Canadian former soccer player who played as a forward for the Boston Breakers of Women's Professional Soccer (WPS) and the Canada national team.

== Club career ==
=== Early years and university ===
Latham played eight years with the Calgary Celtics, a youth team coached by her father, Brian. She was recruited by, and eventually chose to attend, the University of Nebraska–Lincoln. While at the university, she played for the Nebraska Cornhuskers women's soccer team from 1999 to 2002. She was named a three-time NSCAA All-American and left as the all-time leading scorer in the history of the Nebraska women's program with 69 goals. She added a further 29 assists in her 4-year career.

=== Transition to professional soccer ===
Upon graduating from Nebraska, Latham joined San Diego Spirit of Women's United Soccer Association as a Discovery Player in February 2003. In her first year, she scored 6 goals en route to being named the 2003 WUSA Rookie of the Year. This proved to be her last year in the league as the WUSA suspended operations following the conclusion of the 2003 season.

Latham joined New Jersey Wildcats of the W-League in 2005, appearing in 4 games (296 minutes) while scoring 4 goals and assisting on 3 others.

The following season, Latham joined fellow Canadian internationals Sharolta Nonen and Melissa Tancredi at Atlanta Silverbacks. In her first year with the Silverbacks, Latham appeared in 6 games (495 minutes), scoring twice and adding an assist. 2007 saw the departure of Tancredi and Latham increased her production to compensate. She appeared in 9 games (677 minutes) and scored 7 goals with 2 further assists. 2008 saw Latham increase her production even further, appearing in 13 games (1081 minutes) and while getting 13 goals and 2 assists.

The new Women's Professional Soccer (WPS) league took notice of her and Boston Breakers claimed her as a Post-Draft Discovery Player on 10 October 2008. She agreed to terms with the club on 9 January 2009 and played in the 2009 WPS season for Boston. She appeared in 16 games (8 starts, 654 total minutes) and scored twice with one assist. Her option for the 2010 WPS season was picked up by Boston on 28 September 2009.

== International career ==
Latham's international debut came on 5 May 2000 against South Korea. With the Canada women's national soccer team, Latham appeared in the 2003 FIFA Women's World Cup, scoring three goals in six games. She ended her international career with 15 goals in 49 appearances.

In August 2006 Latham and Charmaine Hooper refused to attend two exhibition games against China and fell into dispute with team coach Even Pellerud. Along with a third disgruntled player, Sharolta Nonen, they publicly called for Pellerud's removal. Alleging he had pressured them to break their club contracts in order to join Vancouver Whitecaps and had tried to fix the outcome of a USL W-League play-off by releasing certain national team players but not others. Pellerud suspended the players and terminated their funding. In June 2007 an arbitrator ruled in favour of the coach. Hooper's replacement as captain Christine Sinclair strongly criticised the players' actions: "They let down their teammates and since then have done nothing to rectify it. I wouldn't want them as teammates."

== Post-playing career ==
Latham served as a commentator for Fox Sports at the 2014 CONCACAF Women's Championship and as a studio analyst for the 2015 FIFA Women's World Cup.

== Personal life ==
Latham graduated from the University of Nebraska–Lincoln in May 2005 with a Bachelor of Arts in sociology.
