= Im Eun-ju =

South Korean football referee

Personal information
- Full name: Im Eun-ju
- Date of birth: 13 March 1966 (age 60)
- Height: 1.72 m (5 ft 8 in)

College career
Years	Team	Apps	(Gls)
- Seowon University

International career
1990	South Korea	2	(0)

Managerial career
- 1992–1994: Ewha Womans University
- 2013–2015: Gangwon FC (CEO)
- 2017–2018: FC Anyang (GM)
- 2019: Kiwoom Heroes (GM)
Refereeing career
Domestic
- Years: League
- 1999–2003: K League
International
- Years: League
- 1994–2003: Asian Football Confederation
- 1997–2003: FIFA

- Im Eun-ju
- Hangul: 임은주
- Hanja: 任銀珠
- RR: Im Eunju
- MR: Im Ŭnju
- IPA: im ɯn.dʑu

Im Eun-ju (Korean: 임은주, born 13 March 1966) is a South Korean sports administrator and former football referee and player. She was the first South Korean woman to referee at the international level of association football. After retiring from refereeing, Im spent several years as the CEO of Gangwon FC and FC Anyang in the South Korean football leagues and was briefly named as the first female general manager of a KBO baseball team, the Kiwoom Heroes, in 2019.

== Playing and coaching career ==
Im played various sports as a child, including volleyball and field hockey, but chose to pursue a football scholarship with Seowon University. She earned two caps for South Korea as part of the 1990 Asian Games squad. She later served as a coach at Ewha Womans University, where she also earned a degree in sports education in 1996.

== Refereeing career ==
Im was the first South Korean woman to become a professional referee, earning national qualifications in 1994 and international FIFA qualifications in 1997. She officiated in the K League from 1999 to 2003 and at the 2001 FIFA U-17 World Championship, becoming the first woman to officiate in the tournament's history. Im refereed at two FIFA Women's World Cups, in 1999 and 2003, both hosted by the United States, and at the football tournament at the 2000 Summer Olympics in Australia.

Im was named the 1999 Korea Football Association Referee of the Year. She was later the first woman to become a referee inspector for the Asian Football Confederation and was named to the Asian Referees Committee in 2003.

== Other activities ==
Following her retirement from refereeing, Im joined MBC TV as a television commentator and Eulji University as a guest lecturer. She served as CEO of Gangwon FC from 2013 to 2015 and FC Anyang from 2017 to 2018, stepping down from the latter for health reasons. In January 2019, Im was announced as the general manager of Kiwoom Heroes in the Korea Baseball Organization, becoming the first female manager in the league's history. She was relieved from the position ten days later and replaced by Kim Chi-hyeon, following accusations of improper conduct and hirings at her previous roles in the K League.
