= Taryn Swiatek =

Canadian soccer player (born 1981)

Personal information
- Date of birth: February 4, 1981 (age 45)
- Place of birth: Calgary, Alberta, Canada
- Height: 1.77 m (5 ft 10 in)
- Position: Goalkeeper

Youth career
- 1999–2002: University of Calgary

Senior career*
Years	Team	Apps	(Gls)
2003–2007	Ottawa Fury		
2004	→ Fortuna Hjørring (loan)		

International career
2001–2007	Canada	27	(0)
Medal record
Women's soccer
Representing Canada
Pan American Games
Silver medal – second place	2003 Santo Domingo	Team
Bronze medal – third place	2007 Rio de Janeiro	Team
- * Club domestic league appearances and goals

Taryn Swiatek (born February 4, 1981, in Calgary, Alberta) is a retired Canadian professional soccer player. Swiatek played as goalkeeper for the Canada national team, which placed fourth in the FIFA Women's World Cup competition in 2003. She also joined with the Ottawa Fury soccer team in the W-League. Swiatek formally announced her retirement from the game of soccer in late January 2008.

== Education ==
After graduating from Western Canada High School Swiatek attended the University of Calgary, where she played on the Dino's soccer team. She played for the Dinos from 1999 to 2001 and sat out the 2002 season with a knee injury.
