= Stefanie Gottschlich =

German footballer (born 1978)

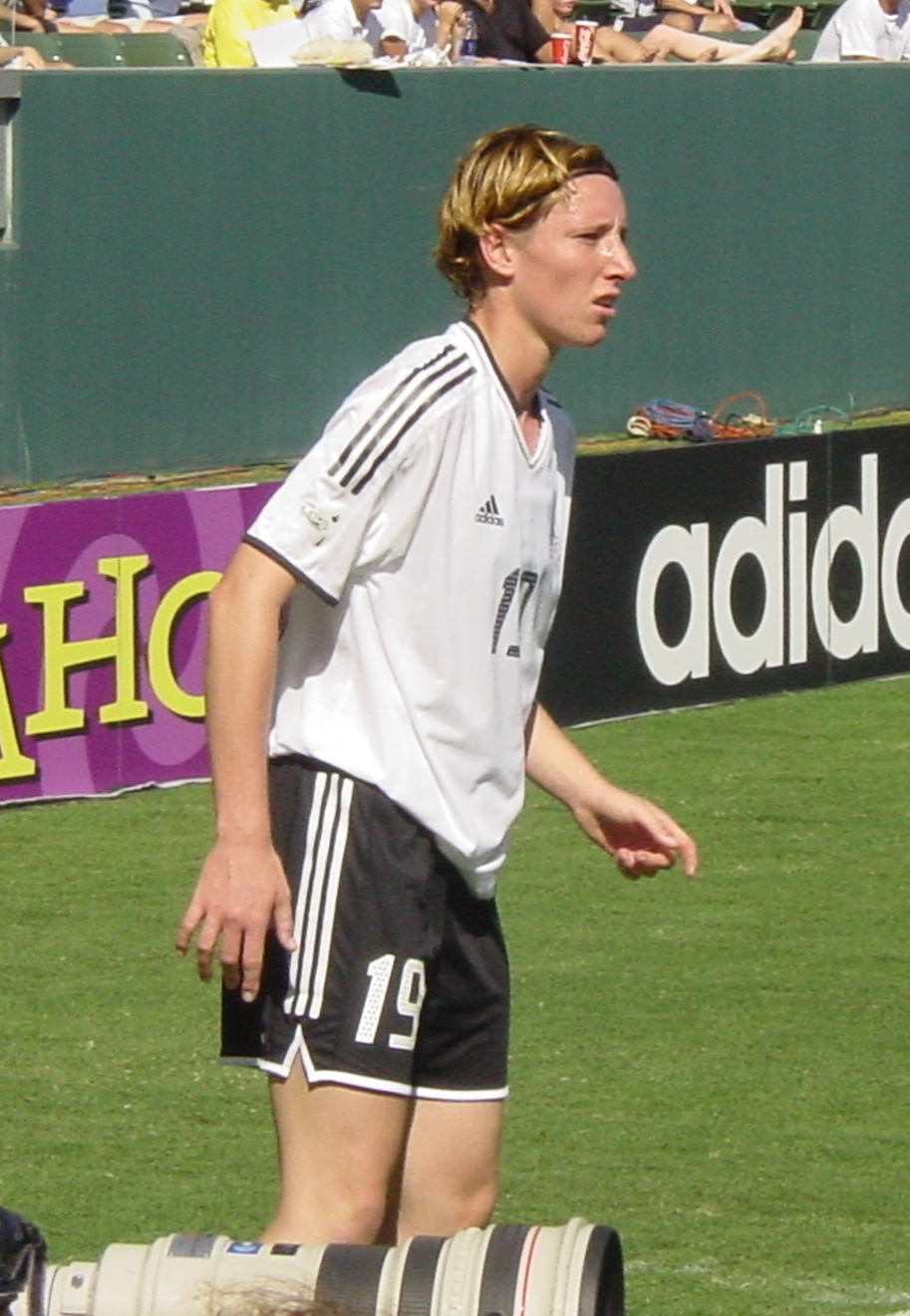
- Gottschlich in 2003

Personal information
- Full name: Stefanie Gottschlich
- Date of birth: 5 August 1978 (age 48)
- Place of birth: Wolfsburg, West Germany
- Height: 1.77 m (5 ft 10 in)
- Position: Midfielder

Senior career*
Years	Team	Apps	(Gls)
1999–2003	WSV Wendschott		
2003–2006	VfL Wolfsburg		

International career
1997–2004	Germany	45	(3)
Medal record
Representing Germany
Olympic Games
Bronze medal – third place	2000 Sydney	Team competition
- * Club domestic league appearances and goals

Stefanie Gottschlich (born 5 August 1978) is a retired German football defender. She scored three goals in 43 caps for the German national team between 1997 and 2006.

Gottschlich played for Germany at the 2000 Summer Olympics.

== International goals ==
No.	Date	Venue	Opponent	Score	Result	Competition
1.	20 September 2003	Columbus Crew Stadium, Columbus, United States	Canada	2–1	4–1	2003 FIFA Women's World Cup
