= Nicole Petignat =

Swiss football referee (born 1966)

Nicole Petignat (born October 27, 1966, in La Chaux-de-Fonds, Switzerland) is a Swiss former football referee. In August 2003 she became the first female referee of a men's football match organized by UEFA; AIK Fotboll (SWE) versus Fylkir (ISL) in the preliminary round of the UEFA Cup.

== Career ==
Petignat passed her youth in the canton of Jura. She started to take courses of arbitration in 1983 and consecutively climbed all the levels leading to the arbitration in the national League A (later the Swiss Super League). Petignat is one of only few female referees to work in professional male football with matches in the first Swiss and Austrian Bundesliga league. Altogether, Petignat refereed 91 Swiss first league matches and in May 2007 the final of the Swiss Cup – FC Basel versus FC Lucerne. Her experience was also recognized when she became the first woman to referee a male UEFA Cup tie in 2003.

In July 1999 in Los Angeles she refereed the final of the FIFA Women's World Cup between the United States and China. She controversially failed to penalise American goalkeeper Brianna Scurry for moving forward off her goal-line during the penalty shoot-out. In September 2000, she refereed in the women's football tournament at the Olympic Games of Sydney and in 2001 she was in charge of the UEFA Women's Euro final; Germany versus Sweden. Later she refereed at the 2003 FIFA Women's World Cup, the Women's Euro 2005 and the Women's World Cup 2007.

As a player, Petignat played up to second division level in Switzerland. She lives in Watt, in the canton of Zurich, where she is a medical masseuse. From 2000 to 2006 she lived together with the Swiss referee Urs Meier. In December 2008, Petignat resigned as a referee.

== Literature ==
- Pierre-André Marchand: Nicole Petignat. La fille que siffle les garçons. Éditions Favre, Lausanne 2006, ISBN 2-8289-0899-2

Preceded by (Denmark) Gitte Lyngo-Nielsen	2001 UEFA Women's Euro Final (Switzerland) Nicole Petignat	Succeeded by (Slovakia) Saša Ihringová
