= Nia Künzer =

German footballer

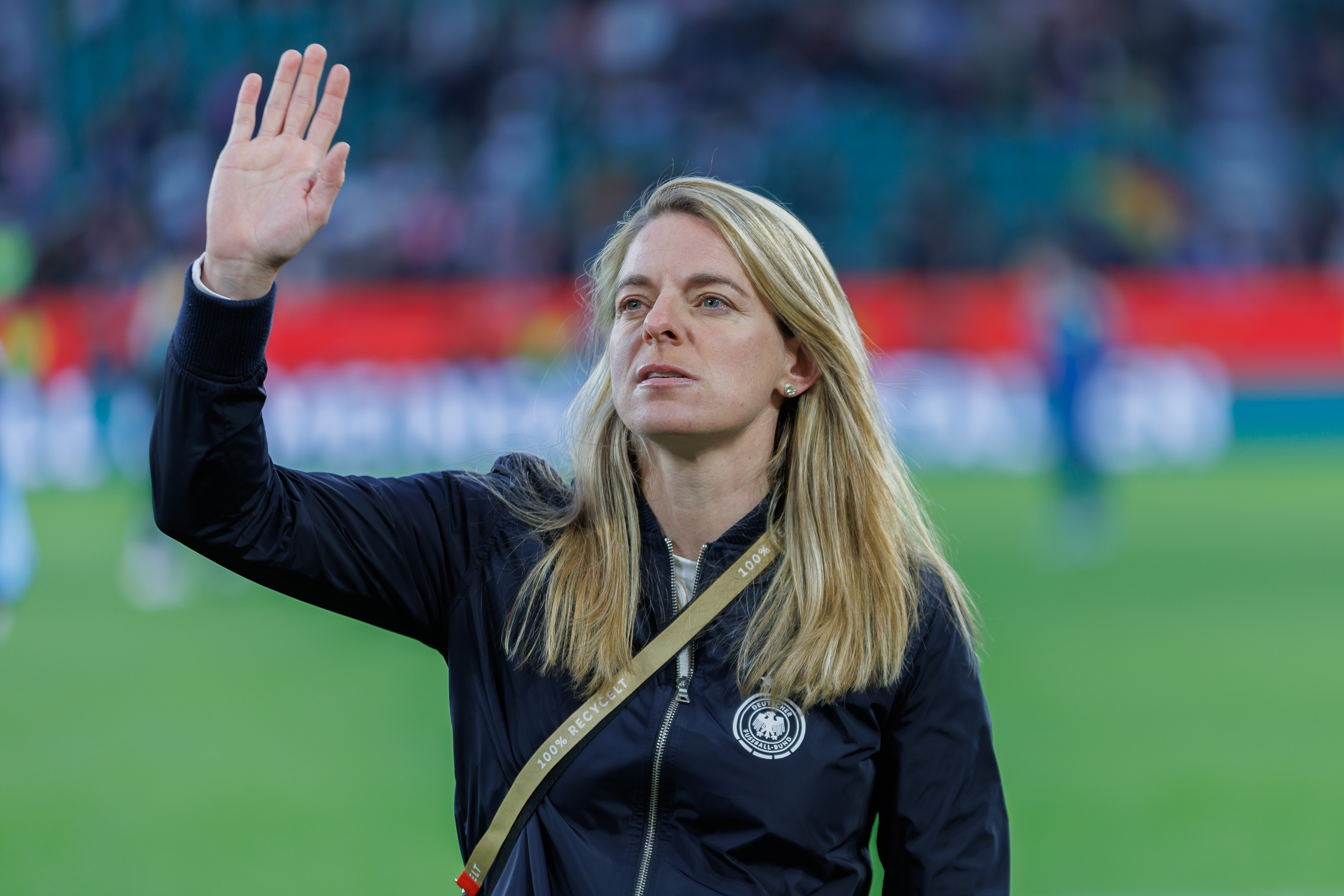
- Künzer in 2025

Personal information
- Full name: Nia Tsholofelo Künzer
- Date of birth: 18 January 1980 (age 46)
- Place of birth: Mochudi, Botswana
- Height: 1.68 m (5 ft 6 in)
- Positions: Defender; defensive midfielder

Youth career
- Eintracht Wetzlar
- VfB Gießen

Senior career*
Years	Team	Apps	(Gls)
1997	SG Praunheim	4	(0)
1998–2008	1. FFC Frankfurt	111	(22)

International career
–1997	Germany U-21	19	(0)
1997–2003	Germany	34	(2)
- * Club domestic league appearances and goals

Nia Tsholofelo Künzer (born 18 January 1980) is a retired German women's football player.

== Early life ==
She was born in Mochudi, Botswana, as Nia Tsholofelo Künzer (her first name being Swahili for "aim" or "intention" and her second name being Tswana for "hope"), where her parents were on a two-year tour with a development aid organization. She grew up in the Albert-Schweitzer-Kinderdorf (children's village) in Wetzlar-Garbenheim, alongside her brother and seven foster children. After the Abitur, she did a year of practical training in social work in a kindergarten for handicapped children. In 2008, she completed a degree in education science (German title Diplompädagogin) at the Justus Liebig University Giessen.

== Career ==
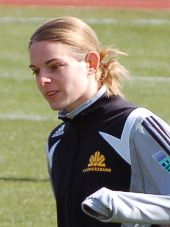
Nia Künzer, DFB Cup in Aschheim 24.03.2008

Having a history as a high jumper, and after being a member of football clubs Eintracht Wetzlar and VfB Gießen she was with 1. FFC Frankfurt (1st Frankfurt Women's Football Club) starting 1997. She played as a defender or midfielder. Künzer retired in July 2008 from professional football after an injury.

== International career ==
Künzer was part of the German women's national football team at the 2003 World Cup. Her "golden goal" in the final match against Sweden made Germany the winner of the tournament with a result of 2-1. The goal was to become the first ever women's "Goal of the Year" in the history of German football. In 2004, the International Football Association Board (IFAB) voted to abolish the "golden goal" rule (taking effect on 1 July 2004), and the tie-breaking format was established, with teams playing two straight 15-minute extra time periods before the game goes to penalty kicks. Künzer's winning goal is the only "golden goal" to decide a Women's World Cup final.

During the winter of 2003/2004 she had to pause for several weeks due to one more cruciate ligament injury, which meant she was not available for the Olympic Games 2004 in Athens, Greece. A fourth cruciate ligament injury forced Künzer to resign from the national team in 2006.

== TV career ==
Künzer also works as a TV sports commentator. She is Das Erste's main pundit for their comprehensive coverage of games involving the national team as well as for major women's tournaments like World Cups, Euros and the Algarve Cup.

== Career statistics ==
=== International goals ===
No.	Date	Venue	Opponent	Score	Result	Competition
1.	25 October 2001	Wolfsburg, Germany	Portugal	2–0	9–0	2003 FIFA Women's World Cup qualification
2.	12 October 2003	Carson, United States	Sweden	2–1	2–1 (a.e.t.)	2003 FIFA Women's World Cup
