= Yanina Gaitán =

Argentine footballer

Personal information
- Full name: Yanina Gaitán
- Date of birth: 3 June 1978 (age 48)
- Place of birth: Argentina
- Height: 1.60 m (5 ft 3 in)
- Position: Midfielder

Youth career
- Sacachispas

Senior career*
Years	Team	Apps	(Gls)
- Yupanqui
- River Plate
- Boca Juniors
- Racing
- San Lorenzo
- Boca Juniors

International career
2003	Argentina		

Managerial career
- 2012: UAI Urquiza (assistant)
- Atlanta (futsal)
- 2021: Deportivo Camioneros
Medal record
Women's football
Representing Argentina
Copa América Femenina
Runner-up	2003 Peru
- * Club domestic league appearances and goals

Yanina Gaitán (born 3 June 1978) is an Argentine football and futsal manager and a retired footballer who played as a midfielder. She was a member of the Argentina women's national team.

== International career ==
Gaitán scored Argentina's first official goal at a World Cup against Germany at the 2003 World Cup.
