= 2003 FIFA Women's World Cup =

2003 edition of the FIFA Women's World Cup

FIFA Women's World Cup USA 2003
- Official logo

Tournament details
- Host country: United States
- Dates: September 20 – October 12
- Teams: 16 (from 6 confederations)
- Venues: 6 (in 6 host cities)

Final positions
- Champions: Germany (1st title)
- Runners-up: Sweden
- Third place: United States
- Fourth place: Canada

Tournament statistics
- Matches played: 32
- Goals scored: 107 (3.34 per match)
- Attendance: 679,666 (21,240 per match)
- Top scorer: (Germany) Birgit Prinz (7 goals)
- Best player: (Germany) Birgit Prinz
- Best goalkeeper: (Germany) Silke Rottenberg
- Fair play award: China

The 2003 FIFA Women's World Cup was the fourth edition of the FIFA Women's World Cup, the quadrennial championship of women's national soccer teams organized by FIFA. It was held in the United States from September 20 to October 12, 2003, at six venues in six cities across the country. The tournament was won by Germany, who became the first country to win both the men's and women's World Cup.

China was originally awarded the right to host the tournament, which would have taken place from September 23 to October 11 in four cities. A severe outbreak of SARS in early 2003 affected Guangdong in southern China and prompted FIFA to move the Women's World Cup to the United States, who had hosted the previous edition in 1999 and the defending champions. China was instead granted hosting rights for the 2007 FIFA Women's World Cup and financial compensation while the United States Soccer Federation made new arrangements to host at smaller stadiums.

== Preparations ==
=== Host selection and change ===
FIFA awarded hosting rights for the Women's World Cup to China on October 26, 2000, beating a bid by Australia. The tournament was originally planned to run from September 23 to October 11 at venues in Shanghai, Wuhan, Chengdu and Hangzhou. Several sporting events in China were canceled or postponed in early April due to the outbreak of SARS in Southern China, including the official draw for the Women's World Cup; FIFA launched a joint investigation with the World Health Organization into whether the outbreak would subside by the time of the tournament. The United States, Canada and Australia were mentioned as potential replacement hosts at the time.

On May 3, 2003, FIFA announced that they would move the tournament to an alternate host country, which would be determined at a later date; the United States and Australia had expressed interest in hosting, while Brazil was floated as another potential host. FIFA also announced that they would instead award the 2007 FIFA Women's World Cup to China and pay $1 million to the organizing committee to compensate for planning expenses. On May 26, 2003, the United States was announced as the tournament's new host, ahead of the other formal bid submitted by Sweden. The United States was judged to be a suitable emergency host because of their experience with organizing the 1999 tournament, despite potential conflicts in the fall sports schedule with American football and baseball. Women's soccer boosters in the United States also hoped that interest generated by the tournament would save the struggling professional league, the Women's United Soccer Association, from folding; the league ultimately folded a few days before the tournament began in September.

== Venues ==
The tournament's 32 matches were played at six venues and organized into 15 doubleheaders, with the exception of the third-place and final matches, which were played on separate days. The Los Angeles area repeated as host of the final, which was moved from the Rose Bowl to the Home Depot Center, a smaller stadium in Carson, California. The matches were scheduled in doubleheaders and moved from four venues on the East Coast to two on the West Coast as it progressed to later matchdays. The size and scope of the tournament were also reduced from the 1999 edition due to the limited time to organize and prepare for the event.

Mostly due to the rescheduling of the tournament on short notice, FIFA and the United States Soccer Federation were forced to creatively schedule matches. Nine doubleheaders were scheduled in group play (similar to the 1999 format). They also had to abandon the modern practice of scheduling the final matches of the group stage to kick off simultaneously. In Groups A and D, the final matches were scheduled as the two ends of a doubleheader. The final matches in Groups B and C were also scheduled as doubleheaders, but split between two cities, with a Group B match in each city followed by a Group C match. The four quarter-finals were also scheduled as two doubleheaders, and both semi-finals were also a doubleheader.

The host stadiums were announced on June 13, 2003, including three large stadiums to open the tournament and three small, soccer-specific stadiums for later stages. Giants Stadium in the New York City area backed out of hosting after being unable to resolve scheduling issues with the New York Giants. For the tournament, Portland's newly renovated PGE Park (formerly Civic Stadium) received a new grass surface and temporary bleachers to expand capacity to 28,359; it was the only venue to host matches during the 1999 and 2003 tournaments. Gillette Stadium replaced the demolished Foxboro Stadium, while RFK Stadium was chosen in place of Jack Kent Cooke Stadium in the Washington, D.C. area. The venues also employed new security measures that were required by the U.S. government following the September 11 attacks in 2001.

Philadelphia	Boston (Foxborough, Massachusetts)	Washington, D.C.
Lincoln Financial Field	Gillette Stadium	Robert F. Kennedy Memorial Stadium
Capacity: 70,000	Capacity: 68,000	Capacity: 53,000
Venues of the 2003 FIFA Women's World Cup in the United States
Los Angeles (Carson, California)	Portland	Columbus
Home Depot Center	PGE Park	Columbus Crew Stadium
Capacity: 27,500	Capacity: 28,359	Capacity: 22,555

== Participating teams and officials ==
=== Qualification ===
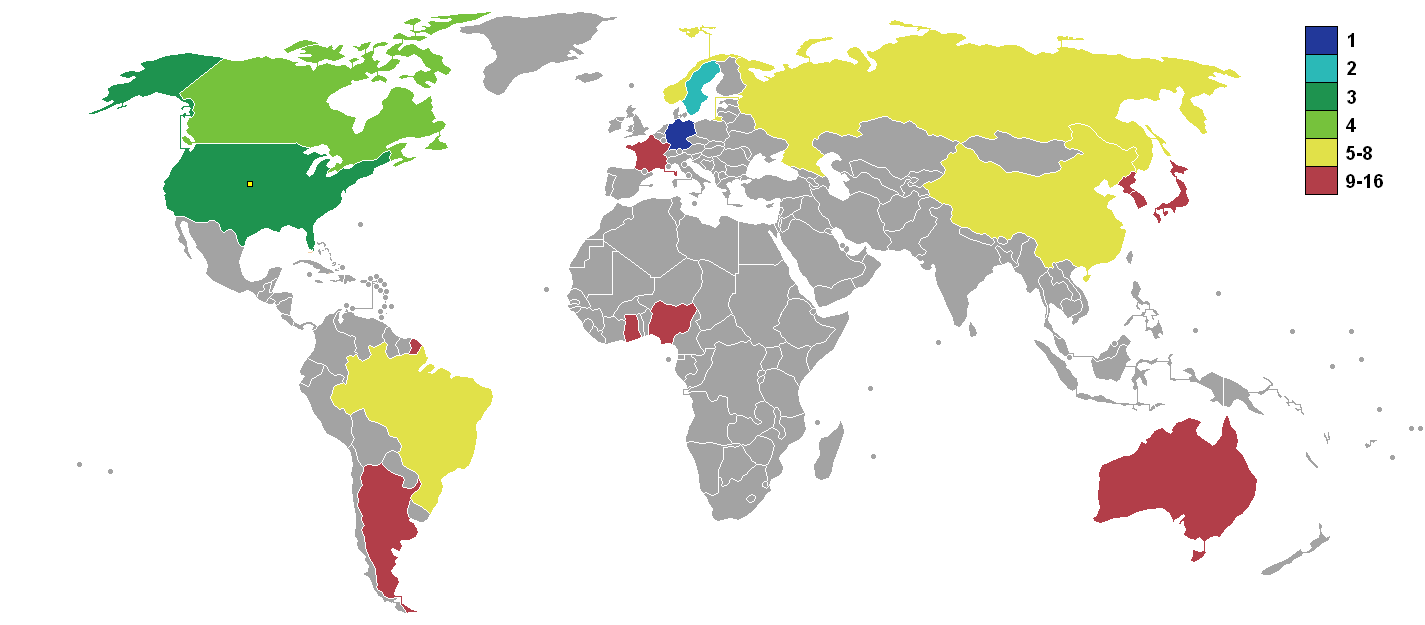
Map of qualified countries and their final ranking in the tournament

Sixteen teams participated in the 2003 Women's World Cup, determined by a set of continental qualification tournaments that took place from August 18, 2001, to July 12, 2003. Three teams, Argentina, France, and South Korea, made their Women's World Cup debuts in the 2003 tournament. The remaining thirteen teams had competed in the previous World Cup.

China was granted automatic qualification as the host and retained it after the United States were named the replacement host. The remaining fifteen participants, including the replacement host, were determined through a series of continental tournaments from a field of 99 teams. FIFA allocated five berths to Europe; two each to Africa, Asia, North America, and South America (increased by one from the 1999 tournament); and one to Oceania. The 2003 Women's World Cup was also used to determine the two European participants in the 2004 Summer Olympics.

- Africa (CAF)
  - Nigeria (23)
  - Ghana (52)
- Asia (AFC)
  - North Korea (7)
  - China (4) (retained automatic qualification as original host)
  - South Korea (25)
  - Japan (14)
- South America (CONMEBOL)
  - Brazil (6)
  - Argentina (35)
- Europe (UEFA)
  - France (9)
  - Germany (3)
  - Russia (11)
  - Norway (2)
  - Sweden (5)
- Oceania (OFC)
  - Australia (15)
- North America, Central America & Caribbean (CONCACAF)
  - Canada (12)
  - United States (1) (replacement host)

Numbers in parentheses indicate the FIFA Women's World Ranking for the team on August 29, 2003, prior to the tournament.

=== Match officials ===
Referees
Confederation	Referee
AFC	Im Eun-ju (South Korea)
AFC	Zhang Dongqing (China PR)
CAF	Bola Elizabeth Abidoye (Nigeria)
CAF	Xonam Agboyi (Togo)
CONCACAF	Sonia Denoncourt (Canada)
CONCACAF	Kari Seitz (United States)
CONMEBOL	Florencia Romano (Argentina)
CONMEBOL	Sueli Tortura (Brazil)
OFC	Tammy Ogston (Australia)
UEFA	Katriina Elovirta (Finland)
UEFA	Cristina Ionescu (Romania)
UEFA	Nicole Petignat (Switzerland)

Fourth officials
Confederation	Referee
CONCACAF	Jennifer Bennett (United States)
CONCACAF	Sandra Hunt (United States)

Assistant referees
Confederation	Assistant referee
AFC	Choi Soo-jin (South Korea)
AFC	Hong Kum-nyo (North Korea)
AFC	Liu Hsiu-mei (Chinese Taipei)
AFC	Hisae Yoshizawa (Japan)
CAF	Florence Biagui (Senegal)
CAF	Perpétué Désirée Krebé (Ivory Coast)
CONCACAF	Lynda Bramble (Trinidad and Tobago)
CONCACAF	Denise Robinson (Canada)
CONCACAF	Karalee Sutton (United States)
CONCACAF	Sharon Wheeler (United States)
CONMEBOL	Alejandra Cercato (Argentina)
CONMEBOL	Sabrina Lois (Argentina)
CONMEBOL	Cleidy Mary Nunes Ribeiro (Brazil)
CONMEBOL	Marlei Leite da Silva (Brazil)
OFC	Airlie Keen (Australia)
OFC	Jacqueline Leleu (Australia)
UEFA	Elke Lüthi (Switzerland)
UEFA	Irina Mirt (Romania)
UEFA	Katarzyna Nadolska (Poland)
UEFA	Emilia Parviainen (Finland)
UEFA	Andi Regan (Northern Ireland)
UEFA	Nelly Viennot (France)

=== Draw ===
The group draw was originally scheduled to take place on May 24, 2003, in Wuhan, China, but was postponed prior to the relocation decision. It instead took place at the Home Depot Center in Carson, California on July 17, 2003, and included a formal handover ceremony for the FIFA Women's World Cup trophy, which was given to U.S. coach April Heinrichs by Chinese coach Ma Liangxing. FIFA also unveiled its Women's World Rankings system, which was used to determine seeded groups and retroactively calculated points for over 3,000 international fixtures dating back to 1971.

The United States was placed in Group A and China was placed in Group D, while Norway and Germany were also seeded in Pot 1. The remaining three pots were distributed geographically to prevent two teams from the same confederation from being drawn into the same group, with the exception of one group that would have two European teams. The hosting United States was drawn into the tournament's "Group of death" alongside Sweden, Nigeria, and North Korea—all considered strong teams from their respective confederations.

Pot 1	Pot 2	Pot 3	Pot 4
United States (A1); China (D1); Germany; Norway	Argentina; Brazil; Ghana; Nigeria	France; Russia; Sweden; South Korea	Australia; Canada; Japan; North Korea

== Group stage ==
The tournament format was unchanged from the 1999 edition, with the first round consisting of sixteen teams organized into four groups by the final draw. The round-robin group stage consisted of 24 matches in which each team played one match against the other three teams in their group. The winners and runners-up from each group qualified for the knockout stage, which began with the quarter-finals.

Tie-breaking criteria for group play
The ranking of teams in the group stage was determined as follows:
1. Points obtained in all group matches (three points for a win, one for a draw, none for a defeat);
2. Goal difference in all group matches;
3. Number of goals scored in all group matches;
4. Points obtained in the matches played between the teams in question;
5. Goal difference in the matches played between the teams in question;
6. Number of goals scored in the matches played between the teams in question;
7. Drawing of lots.

=== Group A ===
Pos	Team	Pld	W	D	L	GF	GA	GD	Pts	Qualification
1	United States (H)	3	3	0	0	11	1	+10	9	Advance to knockout stage
2	Sweden	3	2	0	1	5	3	+2	6	Advance to knockout stage
3	North Korea	3	1	0	2	3	4	−1	3	
4	Nigeria	3	0	0	3	0	11	−11	0	

Source: FIFA
(H) Hosts

Group A included three teams from the previous edition's Group A—hosts and defending champions United States, African champions Nigeria, and Asian champions North Korea—alongside European runners-up Sweden. It was dubbed the tournament's "Group of death" at the time of the final draw, due to the presence of three continental champions and a runner-up. Nigeria were defeated 3–0 by North Korea in the opening match of the tournament, played in Philadelphia on September 20, with two goals by Jin Pyol-hui and one by Ri Un-gyong during a dominating performance for most of the match. The United States began its title defense by winning 3–1 in its match against Sweden in Washington, D.C. at RFK Memorial Stadium, which was attended by 34,144 spectators. Kristine Lilly volleyed a shot from 20 yards (18 m) in the 28th minute and was followed by a Cindy Parlow header for a 2–0 halftime lead. A header by Victoria Svensson in the 58th minute cut the lead, but the two-goal margin was restored in the 78th minute by Shannon Boxx's header on a corner kick.

Sweden won 1–0 in its second match, played against North Korea in Philadelphia, with a seventh-minute volley by Svensson. The Swedish defense limited North Korea to a single shot in the first half, but goalkeeper Ri Jong-hui prevented a rout with several saves. The United States moved further ahead in group standings with a 5–0 defeat of Nigeria, but were unable to clinch an early quarter-final berth. Mia Hamm, the longtime face of the team, scored from a penalty kick in the sixth minute and a 32-yard (29 m) free kick in the twelfth minute. Her strike partner, Cindy Parlow, scored a goal of her own just after halftime by heading in a corner kick taken by Hamm. Substitute forward Abby Wambach scored her first Women's World Cup goal and the match's final goal came from a penalty kick taken in the 89th minute by Julie Foudy.

The third matchday, played as a doubleheader in Columbus, began with Sweden's 3–0 win over Nigeria to earn a quarter-final berth by finishing second in the group. After a scoreless first half, striker Hanna Ljungberg broke the deadlock in the 56th minute with a header and added a second in the 79th minute; Swedish captain Malin Moström then scored a third goal for her team two minutes later on a breakaway, capping a dominating offensive performance with 14 shots on target. The United States benched several of its starting players in their final group stage match against North Korea, which was the first World Cup match without star striker Mia Hamm. The hosts took the lead in the 17th minute from a penalty kick that was awarded for a foul on Tiffeny Milbrett and scored by Abby Wambach. Cat Reddick, the only college player on the U.S. roster, scored from a deflection in the 48th minute and a header in the 66th minute as the United States won 3–0 and finished at the top of Group A.

September 20, 2003
14:45 EDT (UTC−4)

Nigeria	0–3	North Korea
	Report	Jin Pyol-hui 13', 88'; Ri Un-gyong 73'

Lincoln Financial Field, Philadelphia
Attendance: 24,347
Referee: Nicole Petignat (Switzerland)
September 21, 2003
12:30 EDT (UTC−4)

United States	3–1	Sweden
Lilly 27'; Parlow 36'; Boxx 78'	Report	Svensson 58'

Robert F. Kennedy Memorial Stadium, Washington, D.C.
Attendance: 34,144
Referee: Zhang Dongqing (China PR)

September 25, 2003
16:45 EDT (UTC−4)

Sweden	1–0	North Korea
Svensson 7'	Report

Lincoln Financial Field, Philadelphia
Attendance: 31,553
Referee: Tammy Ogston (Australia)
September 25, 2003
19:30 EDT (UTC−4)

United States	5–0	Nigeria
Hamm 6' (pen.), 12'; Parlow 47'; Wambach 65'; Foudy 89' (pen.)	Report

Lincoln Financial Field, Philadelphia
Attendance: 31,553
Referee: Florencia Romano (Argentina)

September 28, 2003
13:00 EDT (UTC−4)

Sweden	3–0	Nigeria
Ljungberg 56', 79'; Moström 81'	Report

Columbus Crew Stadium, Columbus
Attendance: 22,828
Referee: Sonia Denoncourt (Canada)
September 28, 2003
15:45 EDT (UTC−4)

North Korea	0–3	United States
	Report	Wambach 17' (pen.); Reddick 48', 66'

Columbus Crew Stadium, Columbus
Attendance: 22,828
Referee: Sueli Tortura (Brazil)

=== Group B ===
Pos	Team	Pld	W	D	L	GF	GA	GD	Pts	Qualification
1	Brazil	3	2	1	0	8	2	+6	7	Advance to knockout stage
2	Norway	3	2	0	1	10	5	+5	6	Advance to knockout stage
3	France	3	1	1	1	2	3	−1	4	
4	South Korea	3	0	0	3	1	11	−10	0	

Source: FIFA

In Group B, 1999 semi-finalists Brazil and Norway were joined by Women's World Cup debutantes France and South Korea. Norway and France had played in the same continental qualification group, finishing first and second in their group; France qualified for the final European berth by winning a two-stage play-off series against Denmark and England. Norway won 2–0 in their opening match against France, with second-half goals from a header by Anita Rapp and rebound by captain Dagny Mellgren. Brazil defeated South Korea 3–0 in their opener, with a penalty scored by 17-year-old midfielder Marta in the 14th minute and two second-half goals from forward Kátia.

Brazil moved to the top of Group B with a 4–1 defeat of Norway, who were unexpectedly overpowered by the younger members of the Brazil squad. 19-year-old Daniela scored in the 26th minute after a long run through the Norwegian defense and was followed by 21-year-old defender Rosana's header off a free kick in the 37th minute. Norwegian forward Marianne Pettersen scored with a header before halftime to bring the team within one goal of equalizing, but a tap-in from Marta and header by Kátia in the second half earned Brazil their upset victory. The second doubleheader of the matchday ended with South Korea's 1–0 loss to France, with the team's first World Cup goal scored in the 84th minute by Marinette Pichon; as a result, France and Norway were left tied in second place with the possibility of a three-way tie at the end of the group stage.

Norway rebounded from its loss to Brazil by defeating South Korea 7–1 to qualify for the quarter-finals as the second-placed team in the group. Dagny Mellgren scored twice in the first half and also recorded two assists on goals by Solveig Gulbrandsen in the fifth minute and Marianne Pettersen before halftime. Defender Brit Sandaune scored from a 30-yard (27 m) volley early in the second half and was joined on the score-sheet by Linda Ørmen, who entered the match as a substitute in the 69th minute and scored twice at the end of the match. Kim Jin-hee earned a consolation goal, her nation's first in a World Cup, from a defensive mistake in the 75th minute. Brazil took the lead against France in its final group stage match in the 58th minute, through a goal from Kátia, but conceded in stoppage time to a finish by Pichon. The match ended in a 1–1 draw, but Brazil finished atop the group standings and advanced to the quarter-finals.

September 20, 2003
12:00 EDT (UTC−4)

Norway	2–0	France
Rapp 47'; Mellgren 66'	Report

Lincoln Financial Field, Philadelphia
Attendance: 24,347
Referee: Kari Seitz (United States)
September 21, 2003
15:15 EDT (UTC−4)

Brazil	3–0	South Korea
Marta 14' (pen.); Kátia 55', 62'	Report

Robert F. Kennedy Memorial Stadium, Washington, D.C.
Attendance: 34,144
Referee: Tammy Ogston (Australia)

September 24, 2003
17:00 EDT (UTC−4)

Norway	1–4	Brazil
Pettersen 45'	Report	Daniela 26'; Rosana 37'; Marta 59'; Kátia 68'

Robert F. Kennedy Memorial Stadium, Washington, D.C.
Attendance: 16,316
Referee: Xonam Agboyi (Togo)
September 24, 2003
19:45 EDT (UTC−4)

France	1–0	South Korea
Pichon 84'	Report

Robert F. Kennedy Memorial Stadium, Washington, D.C.
Attendance: 16,316
Referee: Zhang Dongqing (China PR)

September 27, 2003
12:45 EDT (UTC−4)

South Korea	1–7	Norway
Kim Jin-hee 75'	Report	Gulbrandsen 5'; Mellgren 24', 31'; Pettersen 40'; Sandaune 52'; Ørmen 80', 90'

Gillette Stadium, Foxborough
Attendance: 14,356
Referee: Tammy Ogston (Australia)
September 27, 2003
12:45 EDT (UTC−4)

France	1–1	Brazil
Pichon 90+2'	Report	Kátia 58'

Robert F. Kennedy Memorial Stadium, Washington, D.C.
Attendance: 17,618
Referee: Cristina Ionescu (Romania)

=== Group C ===
Pos	Team	Pld	W	D	L	GF	GA	GD	Pts	Qualification
1	Germany	3	3	0	0	13	2	+11	9	Advance to knockout stage
2	Canada	3	2	0	1	7	5	+2	6	Advance to knockout stage
3	Japan	3	1	0	2	7	6	+1	3	
4	Argentina	3	0	0	3	1	15	−14	0	

Source: FIFA

Group C included 1995 runners-up Germany, North American runners-up Canada; Japan, who qualified through an inter-continental play-off; and debutants Argentina. In the opening match of the first group doubleheader in Columbus, Christine Sinclair scored her first Women's World Cup goal in the fourth minute from a header to give Canada the lead. Germany then equalized from a penalty kick before halftime, awarded for a handball, and completed a 4–1 comeback victory with three goals in the second half by Birgit Prinz and substitute Kerstin Garefrekes. The second match in Columbus ended with Argentina being defeated 6–0 by Japan, with two goals from Homare Sawa and a hat-trick scored by Mio Otani in an eight-minute span in the second half. Argentina lost forward Natalia Gatti to a red card in the 39th minute, opening the team to attacks form the Japanese.

The second matchday's doubleheader, also played in Columbus, ended with 3–0 victories for Germany over Japan and Canada over Argentina. Germany took advantage of their taller players and physicality to shutout Japan, liming them to a handful of chances. Sandra Minnert scored on a rebound from a corner kick in the 23rd minute and was followed by a pair of goals from forward Birgit Prinz in the 36th and 66th minute, both from overturned balls in the midfield. Canada earned its first World Cup victory in its eighth match with a pair of goals scored by Christine Latham, who also won a penalty in the 19th minute that opened the scoring against Argentina. The victory put Canada level on points with Japan for second place in the group, setting up a winner-take-all scenario in their match against each other.

Canada earned its first quarter-final berth by defeating Japan 3–1 in their final group stage match, despite conceding to Japan's star midfielder Homare Sawa in the 20th minute. Latham equalized with her chipped shot in the 36th minute and Canada took the lead after halftime with a header by Christine Sinclair and a strike by Kara Lang in the 72nd minute. Germany finished atop the group with three wins following their 6–1 rout of Argentina, including four goals scored in the first half. The team lost defender Steffi Jones to a knee injury in the second half and conceded a consolation goal to Argentina before scoring twice at the end of the match to extend their lead.

September 20, 2003
17:45 EDT (UTC−4)

Germany	4–1	Canada
Wiegmann 39' (pen.); Gottschlich 47'; Prinz 75'; Garefrekes 90+2'	Report	Sinclair 4'

Columbus Crew Stadium, Columbus
Attendance: 16,409
Referee: Im Eun-ju (South Korea)
September 20, 2003
20:30 EDT (UTC−4)

Japan	6–0	Argentina
Sawa 13', 38'; Yamamoto 64'; Otani 72', 75', 80'	Report

Columbus Crew Stadium, Columbus
Attendance: 16,409
Referee: Katriina Elovirta (Finland)

September 24, 2003
17:45 EDT (UTC−4)

Germany	3–0	Japan
Minnert 23'; Prinz 36', 66'	Report

Columbus Crew Stadium, Columbus
Attendance: 15,529
Referee: Sueli Tortura (Brazil)
September 24, 2003
20:30 EDT (UTC−4)

Canada	3–0	Argentina
Hooper 19' (pen.); Latham 79', 82'	Report

Columbus Crew Stadium, Columbus
Attendance: 15,529
Referee: Nicole Petignat (Switzerland)

September 27, 2003
15:30 EDT (UTC−4)

Canada	3–1	Japan
Latham 36'; Sinclair 49'; Lang 72'	Report	Sawa 20'

Gillette Stadium, Foxborough
Attendance: 14,356
Referee: Im Eun-ju (South Korea)
September 27, 2003
15:30 EDT (UTC−4)

Argentina	1–6	Germany
Gaitán 71'	Report	Meinert 3', 43'; Wiegmann 24' (pen.); Prinz 32'; Pohlers 89'; Müller 90+2'

Robert F. Kennedy Memorial Stadium, Washington, D.C.
Attendance: 17,618
Referee: Bola Elizabeth Abidoye (Nigeria)

=== Group D ===
Pos	Team	Pld	W	D	L	GF	GA	GD	Pts	Qualification
1	China	3	2	1	0	3	1	+2	7	Advance to knockout stage
2	Russia	3	2	0	1	5	2	+3	6	Advance to knockout stage
3	Ghana	3	1	0	2	2	5	−3	3	
4	Australia	3	0	1	2	3	5	−2	1	

Source: FIFA

Original hosts and 1999 runners-up China were seeded into Group D, where they would play alongside African runners-up Ghana, Oceania champions Australia, and 1999 quarter-finalist Russia. Australia continued their Women's World Cup winless streak by losing 2–1 to Russia in the opening match, despite taking a 1–0 lead in the 38th minute through a goal from Kelly Golebiowski. Russia tied the match a minute later with an own goal from Dianne Alagich and Elena Fomina scored their second in the 89th minute with a strike from the edge of the penalty area. China, considered the favorites to top the group, won 1–0 in their opener against Ghana with a goal by Sun Wen, who was the top goalscorer in the 1999 World Cup.

Russia secured its quarter-final berth by defeating Ghana 3–0 in their second match, which took them to first place in the group. They opened the scoring in the 36th minute with a free kick taken by Marina Saenko, which was followed by a pair of close-range shots in the second half from Natalia Barbashina and Olga Letyushova. Group favorites China had unexpectedly conceded to Australia in the first half of their match, with a goal in the 28th minute for midfielder Heather Garriock, that would have snapped a winless World Cup record for the Matildas. A potential equalizer in the first half from Sun Wen was saved off the line by Cheryl Salisbury, but Bai Jie was able to score shortly after halftime to earn a draw for China and prevent an upset victory for Australia.

Australia continued its winless streak in World Cup play after losing 2–1 in its final group stage match against Ghana, who had also been eliminated from advancing to the quarter-finals. Ghanaian striker Alberta Sackey, who had been named Africa's best female player, scored twice within five minutes near the end of the first half—once from long range and the other from a rebound on a saved shot. Heather Garriock cut the lead in the 61st minute with her goal and Australia pressed for an equalizer, but were unable to score and finished at the bottom of the group. China qualified for the quarter-finals through Australia's elimination and won 1–0 against Russia to finish atop the group standings. Bai Jie scored the lone goal of the match in the 16th minute, despite China's 18 shots—of which seven were saved by Russian goalkeeper Alla Volkova.

September 21, 2003
17:30 PDT (UTC−7)

Australia	1–2	Russia
Golebiowski 38'	Report	Alagich 39' (o.g.); Fomina 89'

Home Depot Center, Carson
Attendance: 15,239
Referee: Bola Elizabeth Abidoye (Nigeria)
September 21, 2003
20:15 PDT (UTC−7)

China	1–0	Ghana
Sun Wen 29'	Report

Home Depot Center, Carson
Attendance: 15,239
Referee: Sonia Denoncourt (Canada)

September 25, 2003
16:15 PDT (UTC−7)

Ghana	0–3	Russia
	Report	Saenko 36'; Barbashina 54'; Letyushova 80'

Home Depot Center, Carson
Attendance: 13,929
Referee: Kari Seitz (United States)
September 25, 2003
19:00 PDT (UTC−7)

China	1–1	Australia
Bai Jie 46'	Report	Garriock 28'

Home Depot Center, Carson
Attendance: 13,929
Referee: Katriina Elovirta (Finland)

September 28, 2003
17:15 PDT (UTC−7)

Ghana	2–1	Australia
A. Sackey 34', 39'	Report	Garriock 61'

PGE Park, Portland
Attendance: 19,132
Referee: Xonam Agboyi (Togo)
September 28, 2003
20:00 PDT (UTC−7)

China	1–0	Russia
Bai Jie 16'	Report

PGE Park, Portland
Attendance: 19,132
Referee: Florencia Romano (Argentina)

== Knockout stage ==
=== Bracket ===
Quarter-finals
October 1 – Foxborough
United States	1
Norway	0
October 2 – Portland
Germany	7
Russia	1
October 1 – Foxborough
Brazil	1
Sweden	2
October 2 – Portland
China	0
Canada	1

Semi-finals
October 5 – Portland
United States	0
Germany	3
October 5 – Portland
Sweden	2
Canada	1

Final
October 12 – Carson
Germany (g.g.)	2
Sweden	1
Third place play-off
October 11 – Carson
United States	3
Canada	1

=== Quarter-finals ===
The first quarter-final doubleheader was played at Gillette Stadium in Foxborough, Massachusetts, with the ordering of the matches swapped to allow a later kickoff for the U.S. match. Sweden took the lead against Brazil in the first match of the night, with a header by Victoria Svensson in the 23rd minute in the run of play. A minute before halftime, Marta drew and scored an equalizing penalty for Brazil after being tripped by goalkeeper Sofia Lundgren, who was starting in place of Caroline Jönsson because of her drug treatment for stomach cramps. Malin Andersson scored the winning goal for Sweden in the 53rd minute from a 24-yard (22 m) free kick as Sweden resisted several chances from Brazil and a controversial uncalled foul in the penalty area during stoppage time to win 2–1. The United States played Norway in their quarter-final match-up, which pitted two of the tournament favorites and ended in a 1–0 victory for the hosts. Abby Wambach scored in the 24th minute from a header off Cat Reddick's free kick from 40 yards (37 m) while also creating other chances to score to no avail. The U.S. failed to extend their lead in the 68th minute, with a penalty kick taken by Mia Hamm that was blocked by goalkeeper Bente Nordby.

The second doubleheader was played between teams from Groups C and D at PGE Park in Portland, Oregon, which would also host the semi-finals. Germany advanced to the semi-finals with a 7–1 defeat of Russia, who matched Chinese Taipei in conceding the most goals in a Women's World Cup quarter-final. The Germans led 1–0 at halftime, with a goal by Martina Müller in the 25th minute, but scored three times within a five-minute span to open the second half after breaking down the Russian defense. After conceding a consolation goal to Elena Danilova in the 70th minute, Germany scored three times in the final ten minutes, including a pair from Brigit Prinz and a second for Kerstin Garefrekes, to close out the match. Canada then achieved an upset defeat of China in their quarter-final match, taking an early lead in the seventh minute through a header from Charmaine Hooper and maintaining a shutout to win 1–0 despite several scoring chances for the Chinese.

October 1, 2003
16:30 EDT (UTC−4)

Brazil	1–2	Sweden
Marta 44' (pen.)	Report	Svensson 23'; Andersson 53'

Gillette Stadium, Foxborough
Attendance: 25,103
Referee: Zhang Dongqing (China PR)

October 1, 2003
19:30 EDT (UTC−4)

United States	1–0	Norway
Wambach 24'	Report

Gillette Stadium, Foxborough
Attendance: 25,103
Referee: Nicole Petignat (Switzerland)

October 2, 2003
16:30 PDT (UTC−7)

Germany	7–1	Russia
Müller 25'; Minnert 57'; Wunderlich 60'; Garefrekes 62', 85'; Prinz 80', 89'	Report	Danilova 70'

PGE Park, Portland
Attendance: 20,012
Referee: Im Eun-ju (South Korea)

October 2, 2003
19:30 PDT (UTC−7)

China	0–1	Canada
	Report	Hooper 7'

PGE Park, Portland
Attendance: 20,012
Referee: Kari Seitz (United States)

=== Semi-finals ===
Germany advanced to their second Women's World Cup final by defeating the United States 3–0 in a major upset of the defending champions in Portland, only their second loss in a Women's World Cup. Germany took the lead in the 15th minute through a header by Kerstin Garefrekes and held onto the shutout, despite the U.S. switching formations to produce attacking chances that often required saves from goalkeeper Silke Rottenberg. The German defense remained resilient to the long-ball play of the United States, which increased in intensity and frequency during the second half—producing six shots on target. Maren Meinert and Brigit Prinz scored a pair of goals in stoppage time, taking advantage of the vulnerable American defense with their counterattacks.

The second semi-final fixture, between Canada and Sweden, remained scoreless through the end of the first hour of play despite chances created by Canadian fullback–forward Charmaine Hooper. Canada were awarded a free kick from 35 yards (32 m) in the 64th minute, which was shot towards goal by Kara Lang and spun off the hands of Jönsson as she attempted to make the save. Sweden made three substitutions to bring on attacking players and won a free kick in the 79th minute that was quickly taken by Victoria Svensson and passed to Malin Moström, who scored the equalizer. Substitute forward Josefine Öqvist scored the winning goal for Sweden six minutes later, finishing a rebound off a shot by Hanna Ljungberg that was saved by goalkeeper Taryn Swiatek.

October 5, 2003
16:30 PDT (UTC−7)

United States	0–3	Germany
	Report	Garefrekes 15'; Meinert 90+1'; Prinz 90+3'

PGE Park, Portland
Attendance: 27,623
Referee: Sonia Denoncourt (Canada)

October 5, 2003
19:30 PDT (UTC−7)

Sweden	2–1	Canada
Moström 79'; Öqvist 86'	Report	Lang 64'

PGE Park, Portland
Attendance: 27,623
Referee: Katriina Elovirta (Finland)

=== Third place play-off ===
The third-place play-off was played on the day before the final at the Home Depot Center in Carson, California, between the United States and their continental rivals Canada. The U.S. retained its mix of veteran and youth players who played in the semi-finals and controlled play for most of the match, taking the lead in the 22nd minute through a long throw-in by Abby Wambach that was volleyed into the goal by Kristine Lilly. Christine Sinclair equalized for Canada within 16 minutes, but the U.S. kept pressing in the second half and re-took the lead in the 51st minute through a header by Shannon Boxx from a corner kick. Tiffeny Milbrett, who was substituted in for Cindy Parlow after she sustained a concussion before halftime, then scored the team's final goal of the tournament in the 80th minute by finishing a rebound off an earlier shot that was blocked at the goal line.

October 11, 2003
12:30 PDT (UTC−7)

United States	3–1	Canada
Lilly 22'; Boxx 51'; Milbrett 80'	Report	Sinclair 38'

Home Depot Center, Carson
Attendance: 25,253
Referee: Tammy Ogston (Australia)

=== Final ===
Germany defeated Sweden in the Women's World Cup final to earn their first world championship and become the first country to win both the men's and women's tournament, as well as the first to win with a female manager. In a rematch of the UEFA Women's Euro 2001 final, Sweden took the lead before halftime on a shot by Hanna Ljungberg from 15 yards (14 m). Germany responded with an equalizing goal in the first minute of the second half, with Maren Meinert scoring in the penalty area on a rebound off goalkeeper Caroline Jönsson. The match remained tied after regulation time and was decided by a golden goal scored in the 98th minute by substitute defender Nia Künzer, who headed in a shot from a free kick taken by Renate Lingor.

October 12, 2003
10:00 am PDT (UTC−7)

Germany	2–1 (a.e.t./g.g.)	Sweden
Meinert 46'; Künzer 98'	Report	Ljungberg 41'

Home Depot Center, Carson
Attendance: 26,137
Referee: Cristina Ionescu (Romania)

== Awards ==
German striker Birgit Prinz was awarded the Golden Ball for her play in the tournament and the Golden Shoe, having scored seven goals. She was later named the FIFA Women's World Player of the Year for 2003, 2004, and 2005. Germany's Kerstin Garefrekes also finished the tournament with four goals and no assists, Kátia won the Bronze Shoe by having played fewer minutes (only 360, compared to the 409 minutes of Garefrekes).

FIFA.com shortlisted six teams, the four semi-finalist teams and two other sides chosen by FIFA (Brazil and China), for users to vote on as the tournaments' most entertaining, with the poll closing on October 10, 2003.

Golden Ball	Silver Ball	Bronze Ball
(Germany) Birgit Prinz	(Sweden) Victoria Svensson	(Germany) Maren Meinert
Golden Shoe	Silver Shoe	Bronze Shoe
(Germany) Birgit Prinz	(Germany) Maren Meinert	(Brazil) Kátia
7 goals, 5 assists 548 minutes played	4 goals, 7 assists 548 minutes played	4 goals, 0 assists 360 minutes played
Best Goalkeeper
(Germany) Silke Rottenberg
FIFA Fair Play Award
China
Most Entertaining Team
Germany

=== All-Star Team ===
The tournament's sixteen-member all-star team, including eleven starters and five substitutes, was selected by the FIFA Technical Study Group and announced on October 8, 2003, by President Joseph Blatter. Germany had five members named to the starting lineup, while runners-up Sweden had two starters and one substitute. Several members of the All-Star Team were later named to the FIFA Women's All Star Team that played against Germany on May 20, 2004, for the centennial anniversary of FIFA.

Goalkeepers	Defenders	Midfielders	Forwards
(Germany) Silke Rottenberg	(China) Wang Liping (United States) Joy Fawcett (Canada) Charmaine Hooper (Germany) Sandra Minnert	(Germany) Bettina Wiegmann (Sweden) Malin Moström (United States) Shannon Boxx (Germany) Maren Meinert	(Germany) Birgit Prinz (Sweden) Victoria Svensson
Substitutes
(Sweden) Caroline Jönsson		(Norway) Solveig Gulbrandsen (Brazil) Marta	(United States) Mia Hamm (Norway) Dagny Mellgren

The "FANtasy All-Star Team", which was sponsored by MasterCard, featured eleven players decided by a poll on FIFA.com.

Goalkeeper	Defenders	Midfielders	Forwards
(United States) Briana Scurry	(Brazil) Juliana (Canada) Charmaine Hooper (Canada) Sharolta Nonen (Germany) Sandra Minnert	(Germany) Bettina Wiegmann (United States) Julie Foudy (United States) Kristine Lilly	(Germany) Maren Meinert (Germany) Birgit Prinz (United States) Mia Hamm

== Statistics ==
=== Goalscorers ===
There were 107 goals scored in 32 matches, for an average of 3.34 goals per match. Birgit Prinz of Germany won the Golden Shoe award for scoring seven goals.

7 goals

- (Germany) Birgit Prinz

4 goals

- (Brazil) Kátia
- (Germany) Kerstin Garefrekes
- (Germany) Maren Meinert

3 goals

- (Brazil) Marta
- (Canada) Christine Latham
- (Canada) Christine Sinclair
- (Japan) Mio Otani
- (Japan) Homare Sawa
- (Norway) Dagny Mellgren
- (Sweden) Hanna Ljungberg
- (Sweden) Victoria Svensson
- (United States) Abby Wambach

2 goals

- (Australia) Heather Garriock
- (Canada) Charmaine Hooper
- (Canada) Kara Lang
- (China) Bai Jie
- (France) Marinette Pichon
- (Germany) Sandra Minnert
- (Germany) Martina Müller
- (Germany) Bettina Wiegmann
- (Ghana) Alberta Sackey
- (North Korea) Jin Pyol-hui
- (Norway) Linda Ørmen
- (Norway) Marianne Pettersen
- (Sweden) Malin Moström
- (United States) Shannon Boxx
- (United States) Mia Hamm
- (United States) Kristine Lilly
- (United States) Cindy Parlow
- (United States) Cat Reddick

1 goal

- (Argentina) Yanina Gaitán
- (Australia) Kelly Golebiowski
- (Brazil) Daniela
- (Brazil) Rosana
- (China) Sun Wen
- (Germany) Stefanie Gottschlich
- (Germany) Nia Künzer
- (Germany) Conny Pohlers
- (Germany) Pia Wunderlich
- (Japan) Emi Yamamoto
- (North Korea) Ri Un-gyong
- (Norway) Solveig Gulbrandsen
- (Norway) Anita Rapp
- (Norway) Brit Sandaune
- (Russia) Natalia Barbashina
- (Russia) Elena Danilova
- (Russia) Elena Fomina
- (Russia) Olga Letyushova
- (Russia) Marina Saenko
- (South Korea) Kim Jin-hee
- (Sweden) Malin Andersson
- (Sweden) Josefine Öqvist
- (United States) Julie Foudy
- (United States) Tiffeny Milbrett

1 own goal

- (Australia) Dianne Alagich (against Russia)

Source: FIFA Technical Report

=== Assists ===
Maren Meinert of Germany had the most assists at the tournament, contributing to seven goals.

7 assists

- (Germany) Maren Meinert

5 assists

- (Germany) Birgit Prinz
- (United States) Mia Hamm

4 assists

- (Sweden) Victoria Svensson

2 assists

- (Brazil) Daniela
- (Brazil) Maycon
- (Germany) Stefanie Gottschlich
- (Germany) Renate Lingor
- (Germany) Kerstin Stegemann
- (Germany) Bettina Wiegmann
- (Japan) Yayoi Kobayashi
- (Japan) Emi Yamamoto
- (Norway) Brit Sandaune
- (Russia) Galina Komarova

1 assist

- (Argentina) Andrea Gonsebate
- (Australia) Kelly Golebiowski
- (Australia) Danielle Small
- (Brazil) Formiga
- (Canada) Kristina Kiss
- (Canada) Kara Lang
- (Canada) Christine Latham
- (Canada) Diana Matheson
- (Canada) Christine Sinclair
- (Canada) Brittany Timko
- (China) Bai Jie
- (China) Sun Wen
- (China) Zhang Ouying
- (France) Peggy Provost
- (France) Élodie Woock
- (Japan) Naoko Kawakami
- (Japan) Mio Otani
- (Japan) Homare Sawa
- (North Korea) Jin Pyol-hui
- (Norway) Ingrid Camilla Fosse Sæthre
- (Norway) Lise Klaveness
- (Norway) Unni Lehn
- (Norway) Dagny Mellgren
- (Norway) Marianne Pettersen
- (Sweden) Malin Andersson
- (Sweden) Hanna Ljungberg
- (Sweden) Malin Moström
- (Sweden) Therese Sjögran
- (United States) Julie Foudy
- (United States) Kristine Lilly
- (United States) Shannon MacMillan
- (United States) Cat Reddick

Source: FIFA Technical Report

=== Tournament ranking ===
Per statistical convention in soccer, matches decided in extra time are counted as wins and losses, while matches decided by penalty shoot-outs are counted as draws.

Pos	Grp	Team	Pld	W	D	L	GF	GA	GD	Pts	Final result
1	C	Germany	6	6	0	0	25	4	+21	18	Champions
2	A	Sweden	6	4	0	2	10	7	+3	12	Runners-up
3	A	United States (H)	6	5	0	1	15	5	+10	15	Third place
4	C	Canada	6	3	0	3	10	10	0	9	Fourth place
5	B	Brazil	4	2	1	1	9	4	+5	7	Eliminated in quarter-finals
6	D	China	4	2	1	1	3	2	+1	7	Eliminated in quarter-finals
7	B	Norway	4	2	0	2	10	6	+4	6	Eliminated in quarter-finals
8	D	Russia	4	2	0	2	6	9	−3	6	Eliminated in quarter-finals
9	B	France	3	1	1	1	2	3	−1	4	Eliminated in group stage
10	C	Japan	3	1	0	2	7	6	+1	3	Eliminated in group stage
11	A	North Korea	3	1	0	2	3	4	−1	3	Eliminated in group stage
12	D	Ghana	3	1	0	2	2	5	−3	3	Eliminated in group stage
13	D	Australia	3	0	1	2	3	5	−2	1	Eliminated in group stage
14	B	South Korea	3	0	0	3	1	11	−10	0	Eliminated in group stage
15	A	Nigeria	3	0	0	3	0	11	−11	0	Eliminated in group stage
16	C	Argentina	3	0	0	3	1	15	−14	0	Eliminated in group stage

Source: FIFA Technical Report
(H) Hosts

== Marketing ==
=== Sponsorships ===
Mastercard was the presenting partner of the FIFA Women's World Cup 2003.

Official Partners	Official Suppliers	Media Supporters
Adidas; Avaya; Bud Light; Coca-Cola; Deutsche Telekom; Emirates; Fujifilm; Hyundai; McDonald's; Philips; Toshiba; Yahoo!	The Home Depot	Comcast; DirecTV
