= 2004 CONCACAF Women's Pre-Olympic Tournament squads =

Association football tournament squads

The 2004 CONCACAF Women's Pre-Olympic Tournament was an international football tournament that was held in Costa Rica from 25 February to 5 March 2004. The eight national teams involved in the tournament were required to register a squad of up to 20 players. Only players in these squads were eligible to take part in the tournament.

The age listed for each player is on 25 February 2004, the first day of the tournament. The numbers of caps and goals listed for each player do not include any matches played after the start of the tournament. The club listed is the club for which the player last played a competitive match prior to the tournament. A flag is included for coaches who are of a different nationality to their team.

== Group A ==
=== Canada ===
Manager: (Norway) Even Pellerud

Canada named their final squad on 18 February 2004.

No.	Pos.	Player	Date of birth (age)	Caps	Goals	Club
1	GK	Karina LeBlanc	30 March 1980 (aged 23)			
2	FW	Christine Latham	15 September 1981 (aged 22)			
3	MF	Carmelina Moscato	2 May 1984 (aged 19)			
4	MF	Véronique Maranda	18 August 1986 (aged 17)			
5	MF	Andrea Neil	26 November 1971 (aged 32)			
6	DF	Sharolta Nonen	30 December 1977 (aged 26)			
7	DF	Isabelle Morneau	18 April 1976 (aged 27)			
8	MF	Marie-Ève Nault	16 February 1982 (aged 22)			
9	MF	Rhian Wilkinson	12 May 1982 (aged 21)			
10	FW	Charmaine Hooper	15 January 1968 (aged 36)			
11	DF	Randee Hermus	14 November 1979 (aged 24)			
12	FW	Christine Sinclair	12 June 1983 (aged 20)			
13	MF	Diana Matheson	6 April 1984 (aged 19)			
14	FW	Aysha Jamani	28 June 1987 (aged 16)			
15	FW	Kara Lang	22 October 1986 (aged 17)			
16	MF	Brittany Timko	5 September 1985 (aged 18)			
17	DF	Melissa Tancredi	27 December 1981 (aged 22)			
18	DF	Tanya Dennis	26 August 1985 (aged 18)			
20	GK	Taryn Swiatek	4 February 1981 (aged 23)			
22	GK	Erin McLeod	26 February 1983 (aged 20)			

=== Costa Rica ===
Manager: Ricardo Rodríguez

Costa Rica named their final squad on 16 February 2004.

No.	Pos.	Player	Date of birth (age)	Caps	Goals	Club
1	GK	Alejandra Álvarez	19 January 1981 (aged 23)			
2	DF	Daniela Serruth	16 May 1987 (aged 16)			
3	DF	Gabriela Trujillo	21 November 1978 (aged 25)			
4	DF	Karol Segura	7 February 1984 (aged 20)			
5	DF	Mónica Salazar	14 June 1986 (aged 17)			
6	DF	Xiomara Briceño	1 September 1977 (aged 26)			
7	MF	Emilia Solano	6 September 1980 (aged 23)			
8	MF	Ana Gabriela Campos	4 July 1981 (aged 22)			
9	FW	Erica Castro	14 August 1980 (aged 23)			
10	MF	Shirley Cruz	28 August 1985 (aged 18)			
11	FW	Megan Chávez	4 December 1983 (aged 20)			
12	DF	Laura Sánchez	9 July 1985 (aged 18)			
13	FW	Karla Villalobos	16 July 1986 (aged 17)			
14	MF	Wendy Barrantes	24 July 1974 (aged 29)			
15	DF	Yahaira Aguilar	9 April 1979 (aged 24)			
16	MF	Cindy Rodríguez	24 April 1984 (aged 19)			
17	DF	Jacqueline Álvarez	19 December 1977 (aged 26)			
18	DF	Maricela Montes	1 April 1986 (aged 17)			
19	DF	Marian Montes	4 September 1986 (aged 17)			
20	GK	Silva Arias	1 April 1986 (aged 17)			

=== Jamaica ===
Manager: Christopher Bender

Jamaica named an 18-player squad for the tournament.

No.	Pos.	Player	Date of birth (age)	Caps	Goals	Club
1	GK	Chantelle McLennon	11 March 1984 (aged 19)			
4	DF	Sharika Evans	7 September 1984 (aged 19)			
5	DF	Geneva Sinclair	1 March 1979 (aged 24)			
6	MF	Nordia Reid	25 June 1979 (aged 24)			
7	FW	Alicia Wilson	19 December 1979 (aged 24)			
8	MF	Diana Hue	28 August 1981 (aged 22)			
9	MF	Alicia James	22 September 1982 (aged 21)			
10	MF	Jodi-Ann McGregor	4 October 1985 (aged 18)			
11	DF	Neisha Forbes	9 March 1983 (aged 20)			
12	DF	Philisha Lewis	15 December 1985 (aged 18)			
13	DF	Peatria Campbell	23 March 1984 (aged 19)			
14	MF	Rochelle Bryan	11 December 1987 (aged 16)			
15	DF	Hishamar Falconer	2 June 1983 (aged 20)			
16	DF	Sasheena Stewart	10 June 1983 (aged 20)			
17	FW	Venicia Reid	28 October 1987 (aged 16)			
18	FW	Tashana Vincent	23 March 1987 (aged 16)			
19	MF	Denise Duncan	28 March 1983 (aged 20)			
20	FW	Sheree Marrow	28 April 1985 (aged 18)			

=== Panama ===
Manager: Ezequiel Fernández

Panama named a 20-player squad for the tournament.

No.	Pos.	Player	Date of birth (age)	Caps	Goals	Club
1	GK	Mónica Franco	10 November 1983 (aged 20)			
2	DF	Tricia Arosemena	20 October 1983 (aged 20)			
3	DF	Yamileth Flores	7 July 1980 (aged 23)			
4	DF	Elizabeth Louis	24 April 1979 (aged 24)			
5	DF	Irene Pineda	12 December 1985 (aged 18)			
6	MF	Raiza Gutiérrez	26 June 1983 (aged 20)			
7	MF	Yoraidil Pérez	28 March 1985 (aged 18)			
8	MF	Máxima González	30 January 1985 (aged 19)			
9	FW	Amarelis De Mera	28 March 1985 (aged 18)			
10	DF	Lucrecia Bustamante	27 August 1985 (aged 18)			
11	MF	Diana Valderrama	1 February 1978 (aged 26)			
12	GK	Stephanie Ortega	25 April 1984 (aged 19)			
13	FW	Maritzenia Bedoya	15 May 1980 (aged 23)			
14	FW	Steffany Aguilar	22 June 1977 (aged 26)			
15	DF	Ruth Romero	28 March 1985 (aged 18)			
16	DF	Tania Domínguez	18 October 1984 (aged 19)			
17	FW	Natalia Perea	27 February 1979 (aged 24)			
18	DF	Natalia Abrego	27 August 1987 (aged 16)			
19	DF	Josselyn Montilla	21 March 1985 (aged 18)			
20	DF	Tatiana Montes	8 April 1986 (aged 17)			

== Group B ==
=== Haiti ===
Manager: Sonche Pierre

Haiti named a 19-player squad for the tournament.

No.	Pos.	Player	Date of birth (age)	Caps	Goals	Club
1	GK	Gina Montinard	31 December 1977 (aged 26)			
2	DF	Fritzca Badio	22 December 1983 (aged 20)			
3	DF	Judith Fenelon	26 August 1980 (aged 23)			
4	DF	Kencia Marseille	8 November 1980 (aged 23)			
5	MF	Elirose Jean-Louis	10 March 1969 (aged 34)			
6	MF	Fernande Hilaire	16 May 1977 (aged 26)			
7	DF	Yvette Félix	3 February 1972 (aged 32)			
8	FW	Myrlande Bien-Aimé	15 May 1975 (aged 28)			
9	FW	Viola Nord	14 May 1978 (aged 25)			
10	MF	Sherline Ridore	12 November 1984 (aged 19)			
11	MF	Darline Lundy	17 June 1983 (aged 20)			
12	MF	Manouchka Salam	22 February 1980 (aged 24)			
13	MF	Pharana Jean-Louis				
14	MF	Natacha Cajuste	2 May 1984 (aged 19)			
15	MF	Ghislaine Saint-Louis	7 March 1983 (aged 20)			
16	MF	Nadège Deca				
17	MF	Adeline Saintilmond	14 December 1984 (aged 19)			
18	DF	Guerda Marcellus	11 April 1981 (aged 22)			
20	GK	Monique Alsaint	5 July 1969 (aged 34)			

=== Mexico ===
Manager: Leonardo Cuéllar

No.	Pos.	Player	Date of birth (age)	Caps	Goals	Club
1	GK	Jennifer Molina	27 June 1981 (aged 22)			
2	DF	Elizabeth Gómez	21 September 1981 (aged 22)			
3	DF	Marlene Sandoval	18 January 1984 (aged 20)			
4	DF	Mónica González	10 October 1978 (aged 25)			
5	DF	María de Jesús Castillo	6 July 1983 (aged 20)			
6	MF	Mónica Vergara	2 May 1983 (aged 20)			
7	MF	Evelyn López	25 December 1978 (aged 25)			
8	MF	Fátima Leyva	14 February 1980 (aged 24)			
9	FW	Maribel Domínguez	18 November 1976 (aged 27)			
10	FW	Iris Mora	22 September 1981 (aged 22)			
11	MF	Patricia Pérez	17 December 1978 (aged 25)			
12	GK	Pamela Tajonar	2 December 1984 (aged 19)			
13	DF	Carina Maravillas	22 June 1983 (aged 20)			
14	MF	Jenny Ruiz	9 August 1983 (aged 20)			
15	MF	Luz Saucedo	14 December 1983 (aged 20)			
16	MF	Nadia Hernández	20 December 1981 (aged 22)			
17	MF	Rebecca Juárez	13 December 1986 (aged 17)			
18	FW	Lupita Worbis	12 December 1983 (aged 20)			
19	FW	Alma Martínez	22 September 1981 (aged 22)			
20	GK	Alba García	11 September 1981 (aged 22)			

=== Trinidad and Tobago ===
Manager: Jamaal Shabazz

No.	Pos.	Player	Date of birth (age)	Caps	Goals	Club
1	GK	Nicole Mitchell	23 July 1975 (aged 28)			
2	DF	Janelle Noel	5 May 1977 (aged 26)			
3	MF	Raeann Elder	13 January 1981 (aged 23)			
4	MF	Sedonna Agard	22 May 1981 (aged 22)			
5	MF	Nadia James	1 January 1985 (aged 19)			
6	MF	Niasha Reyes	22 August 1985 (aged 18)			
7	FW	Jinelle James	10 July 1978 (aged 25)			
8	DF	Regina McGee	20 February 1984 (aged 20)			
9	FW	Maylee Atthin-Johnson	9 May 1988 (aged 15)			
10	MF	Tasha St. Louis	20 December 1983 (aged 20)			
11	DF	Kathy-Ann Nixon	3 April 1976 (aged 27)			
12	FW	Ahkeela Mollon	2 April 1985 (aged 18)			
13	FW	Aveann Douglas	10 August 1986 (aged 17)			
14	FW	Tanekar Alexander	3 September 1984 (aged 19)			
15	MF	Jenelle Nedd	30 October 1982 (aged 21)			
16	MF	Leslie-Ann James	20 January 1981 (aged 23)			
17	FW	Natalie des Vignes	20 September 1976 (aged 27)			
18	DF	Terrie-Lisa John	24 November 1976 (aged 27)			
19	DF	Katrina Meyer	23 September 1986 (aged 17)			
20	GK	Lisa-Jo Ramkissoon	18 January 1985 (aged 19)			

=== United States ===
Manager: April Heinrichs

The United States named their final squad on 10 February 2004.

No.	Pos.	Player	Date of birth (age)	Caps	Goals	Club
1	GK	Briana Scurry	7 September 1971 (aged 32)	132	0	
2	DF	Heather Mitts	6 June 1978 (aged 25)	8	0	
3	DF	Christie Rampone	24 June 1975 (aged 28)	110	4	
4	DF	Cat Reddick	10 February 1982 (aged 22)	44	3	
5	MF	Leslie Osborne	27 May 1983 (aged 20)	3	0	
6	DF	Amy LePeilbet	12 March 1982 (aged 21)	2	0	
7	MF	Shannon Boxx	29 June 1977 (aged 26)	12	5	
8	FW	Shannon MacMillan	7 October 1974 (aged 29)	163	59	
9	FW	Mia Hamm	17 March 1972 (aged 31)	246	144	
10	MF	Aly Wagner	10 August 1980 (aged 23)	53	12	
11	MF	Julie Foudy	23 January 1971 (aged 33)	244	42	
12	FW	Cindy Parlow	8 May 1978 (aged 25)	134	65	
13	MF	Kristine Lilly	22 July 1971 (aged 32)	268	93	
14	DF	Joy Fawcett	8 February 1968 (aged 36)	229	27	
15	DF	Kate Markgraf	23 August 1976 (aged 27)	107	0	
16	MF	Lindsay Tarpley	22 September 1983 (aged 20)	11	3	
17	FW	Heather O'Reilly	2 January 1985 (aged 19)	21	3	
18	GK	Siri Mullinix	22 May 1978 (aged 25)	42	0	
19	MF	Angela Hucles	5 July 1978 (aged 25)	27	1	
20	FW	Abby Wambach	2 June 1980 (aged 23)	25	14	
