= 2011 FIFA Women's World Cup Group B =

Official football group consisting of four countries

Group B of the 2011 FIFA Women's World Cup consisted of the teams from Japan, New Zealand, Mexico and England. The games were played on 27 June, 1 July and 5 July 2011. The top two teams advanced to the knockout stage.

== Standings ==
Pos	Team	Pld	W	D	L	GF	GA	GD	Pts	Qualification
1	England	3	2	1	0	5	2	+3	7	Advance to knockout stage
2	Japan	3	2	0	1	6	3	+3	6	Advance to knockout stage
3	Mexico	3	0	2	1	3	7	−4	2	
4	New Zealand	3	0	1	2	4	6	−2	1	

Source: FIFA
Rules for classification: Group stage tiebreakers

== Matches ==
=== Japan vs New Zealand ===
27 June 2011
15:00

Japan	2–1	New Zealand
Nagasato 6'; Miyama 68'	Report	Hearn 12'

Ruhrstadion, Bochum
Attendance: 12,538
Referee: Kirsi Heikkinen (Finland)

Japan	New Zealand

JAPAN:
GK	21	Ayumi Kaihori
RB	2	Yukari Kinga
CB	3	Azusa Iwashimizu
CB	4	Saki Kumagai
LB	15	Aya Sameshima
DM	6	Mizuho Sakaguchi
RM	17	Yūki Nagasato	(substituted off) 76'
CM	10	Homare Sawa (c)
LM	8	Aya Miyama
SS	11	Shinobu Ohno	(substituted off) 55'
CF	7	Kozue Ando	(substituted off) 90+2'
Substitutions:
FW	20	Mana Iwabuchi	(substituted in) 55'
FW	18	Karina Maruyama	(substituted in) 76'
DF	16	Asuna Tanaka	(substituted in) 90+2'
Manager:
Norio Sasaki

NEW ZEALAND:
GK	1	Jenny Bindon
RB	3	Anna Green
CB	5	Abby Erceg
CB	6	Rebecca Smith (c)	(yellow card) 67'
LB	7	Ali Riley
CM	2	Ria Percival		(substituted off) 76'
CM	4	Katie Hoyle
CM	18	Katie Bowen	(yellow card) 45+1'	(substituted off) 46'
AM	12	Betsy Hassett
CF	10	Sarah Gregorius		(substituted off) 62'
CF	9	Amber Hearn	(yellow card) 77'
Substitutions:
MF	8	Hayley Moorwood		(substituted in) 46'
FW	17	Hannah Wilkinson		(substituted in) 62'
MF	16	Annalie Longo		(substituted in) 76'
Manager:
John Herdman

Player of the Match:
Aya Miyama (Japan)

Assistant referees:
Anu Jokela (Finland)
Tonja Paavola (Finland)
Fourth official:
Kateryna Monzul (Ukraine)

=== Mexico vs England ===
27 June 2011
18:00

Mexico	1–1	England
Ocampo 33'	Report	Williams 21'

Volkswagen Arena, Wolfsburg
Attendance: 18,702
Referee: Silvia Reyes (Peru)

Mexico	England

MEXICO:
GK	20	Cecilia Santiago
RB	5	Natalie Vinti
CB	4	Alina García Méndez	(yellow card) 87'
CB	3	Rubí Sandoval
LB	15	Luz Saucedo
CM	10	Dinora Garza		(substituted off) 85'
CM	8	Lupita Worbis
CM	11	Nayeli Rangel
RF	21	Stephany Mayor
CF	9	Maribel Domínguez (c)		(substituted off) 76'
LF	19	Mónica Ocampo
Substitutions:
MF	7	Evelyn López		(substituted in) 76'
MF	17	Teresa Noyola		(substituted in) 85'
Manager:
Leonardo Cuéllar

ENGLAND:
GK	1	Karen Bardsley
RB	2	Alex Scott
CB	5	Faye White (c)		(substituted off) 83'
CB	6	Casey Stoney	(yellow card) 88'
LB	3	Rachel Unitt
CM	12	Karen Carney		(substituted off) 72'
CM	8	Fara Williams
CM	4	Jill Scott
AM	11	Rachel Yankey
CF	14	Eniola Aluko
CF	10	Kelly Smith
Substitutions:
FW	9	Ellen White		(substituted in) 72'
DF	15	Sophie Bradley		(substituted in) 83'
Manager:
Hope Powell

Player of the Match:
Mónica Ocampo (Mexico)

Assistant referees:
Mariana Corbo (Uruguay)
Marlene Leyton (Peru)
Fourth official:
Estela Álvarez (Argentina)

=== Japan vs Mexico ===
1 July 2011
15:00

Japan	4–0	Mexico
Sawa 13', 39', 80'; Ohno 15'	Report

BayArena, Leverkusen
Attendance: 22,291
Referee: Christina Pedersen (Norway)

Japan	Mexico

JAPAN:
GK	21	Ayumi Kaihori
RB	2	Yukari Kinga
CB	3	Azusa Iwashimizu
CB	4	Saki Kumagai
LB	15	Aya Sameshima
DM	6	Mizuho Sakaguchi
RM	17	Yūki Nagasato
CM	10	Homare Sawa (c)	(substituted off) 83'
LM	8	Aya Miyama
SS	11	Shinobu Ohno	(substituted off) 69'
CF	7	Kozue Ando	(substituted off) 69'
Substitutions:
MF	9	Nahomi Kawasumi	(substituted in) 69'
FW	20	Mana Iwabuchi	(substituted in) 69'
MF	13	Rumi Utsugi	(substituted in) 83'
Manager:
Norio Sasaki

MEXICO:
GK	20	Cecilia Santiago
RB	5	Natalie Vinti
CB	6	Natalie García Méndez
CB	4	Alina García Méndez
LB	15	Luz Saucedo
CM	10	Dinora Garza
CM	11	Nayeli Rangel	(substituted off) 46'
RW	21	Stephany Mayor
AM	18	Verónica Pérez	(substituted off) 79'
LW	19	Mónica Ocampo
CF	9	Maribel Domínguez (c)	(substituted off) 62'
Substitutions:
MF	13	Liliana Mercado	(substituted in) 46'
DF	2	Kenti Robles	(substituted in) 62'
MF	17	Teresa Noyola	(substituted in) 79'
Manager:
Leonardo Cuéllar

Player of the Match:
Homare Sawa (Japan)

Assistant referees:
Hege Steinlund (Norway)
Lada Rojc (Croatia)
Fourth official:
Thalia Mitsi (Greece)

=== New Zealand vs England ===
1 July 2011
18:15

New Zealand	1–2	England
Gregorius 18'	Report	J. Scott 63'; Clarke 81'

Rudolf-Harbig-Stadion, Dresden
Attendance: 19,110
Referee: Thérèse Neguel (Cameroon)

New Zealand	England

NEW ZEALAND:
GK	1	Jenny Bindon
RB	3	Anna Green
CB	6	Rebecca Smith (c)
CB	5	Abby Erceg
LB	7	Ali Riley
CM	2	Ria Percival	(substituted off) 71'
CM	4	Katie Hoyle
CM	18	Katie Bowen	(substituted off) 46'
AM	12	Betsy Hassett
CF	10	Sarah Gregorius	(substituted off) 90'
CF	9	Amber Hearn
Substitutions:
MF	8	Hayley Moorwood	(substituted in) 46'
MF	13	Rosie White	(substituted in) 71'
FW	17	Hannah Wilkinson	(substituted in) 90'
Manager:
John Herdman

ENGLAND:
GK	1	Karen Bardsley
RB	2	Alex Scott
CB	5	Faye White (c)	(substituted off) 86'
CB	6	Casey Stoney
LB	3	Rachel Unitt
CM	8	Fara Williams
CM	4	Jill Scott
RW	14	Eniola Aluko	(substituted off) 46'
AM	11	Rachel Yankey	(substituted off) 65'
LW	9	Ellen White
CF	10	Kelly Smith
Substitutions:
MF	12	Karen Carney	(substituted in) 46'
FW	7	Jessica Clarke	(substituted in) 65'
DF	15	Sophie Bradley	(substituted in) 86'
Manager:
Hope Powell

Player of the Match:
Alex Scott (England)

Assistant referees:
Tempa Ndah François (Benin)
Lidwine Rakotozafinoro (Madagascar)
Fourth official:
Quetzalli Alvarado (Mexico)

=== England vs Japan ===
5 July 2011
18:15

England	2–0	Japan
E. White 15'; Yankey 66'	Report

Impuls Arena, Augsburg
Attendance: 20,777
Referee: Carol Anne Chenard (Canada)

England	Japan

ENGLAND:
GK	1	Karen Bardsley
RB	2	Alex Scott
CB	15	Sophie Bradley
CB	6	Casey Stoney (c)
LB	3	Rachel Unitt
DM	18	Anita Asante
CM	12	Karen Carney
CM	4	Jill Scott
RF	7	Jessica Clarke	(substituted off) 46'
CF	10	Kelly Smith	(substituted off) 62'
LF	9	Ellen White
Substitutions:
MF	11	Rachel Yankey	(substituted in) 46'
FW	14	Eniola Aluko	(substituted in) 62'
Manager:
Hope Powell

JAPAN:
GK	21	Ayumi Kaihori
RB	2	Yukari Kinga
CB	3	Azusa Iwashimizu
CB	4	Saki Kumagai
LB	15	Aya Sameshima
DM	6	Mizuho Sakaguchi	(substituted off) 75'
RM	17	Yūki Nagasato
CM	10	Homare Sawa (c)
LM	8	Aya Miyama
SS	11	Shinobu Ohno	(substituted off) 82'
CF	7	Kozue Ando	(substituted off) 56'
Substitutions:
FW	18	Karina Maruyama	(substituted in) 56'
FW	20	Mana Iwabuchi	(substituted in) 75'
MF	9	Nahomi Kawasumi	(substituted in) 82'
Manager:
Norio Sasaki

Player of the Match:
Jill Scott (England)

Assistant referees:
Marlene Duffy (United States)
Emperatriz Ayala (El Salvador)
Fourth official:
Kari Seitz (United States)

=== New Zealand vs Mexico ===
5 July 2011
18:15

New Zealand	2–2	Mexico
Smith 90'; Wilkinson 90+4'	Report	Mayor 2'; Domínguez 29'

Rhein-Neckar-Arena, Sinsheim
Attendance: 20,451
Referee: Jenny Palmqvist (Sweden)

New Zealand	Mexico

NEW ZEALAND:
GK	1	Jenny Bindon
RB	3	Anna Green
CB	6	Rebecca Smith (c)
CB	5	Abby Erceg
LB	7	Ali Riley
DM	4	Katie Hoyle
RM	12	Betsy Hassett		(substituted off) 79'
CM	8	Hayley Moorwood		(substituted off) 60'
LM	13	Rosie White	(yellow card) 33'	(substituted off) 55'
CF	10	Sarah Gregorius
CF	9	Amber Hearn
Substitutions:
FW	17	Hannah Wilkinson		(substituted in) 55'
MF	11	Kirsty Yallop		(substituted in) 60'
DF	2	Ria Percival		(substituted in) 79'
Manager:
John Herdman

MEXICO:
GK	20	Cecilia Santiago
RB	5	Natalie Vinti
CB	6	Natalie García Méndez
CB	4	Alina García Méndez
LB	2	Kenti Robles		(substituted off) 81'
CM	8	Lupita Worbis
CM	11	Nayeli Rangel		(substituted off) 46'
RW	21	Stephany Mayor		(substituted off) 70'
AM	18	Verónica Pérez
LW	19	Mónica Ocampo
CF	9	Maribel Domínguez (c)	(yellow card) 90+1'
Substitutions:
MF	10	Dinora Garza		(substituted in) 46'
DF	16	Charlyn Corral		(substituted in) 70'
DF	15	Luz Saucedo		(substituted in) 81'
Manager:
Leonardo Cuéllar

Player of the Match:
Maribel Domínguez (Mexico)

Assistant referees:
Helen Karo (Sweden)
Anna Nyström (Sweden)
Fourth official:
Jacqui Melksham (Australia)

== See also ==
- England at the FIFA Women's World Cup
- Japan at the FIFA Women's World Cup
- Mexico at the FIFA Women's World Cup
- New Zealand at the FIFA Women's World Cup
