= 2004 CONCACAF Women's Pre-Olympic Tournament qualification =

Tournament details
- Dates: 31 October – 14 December 2003
- Teams: 12

Tournament statistics
- Matches played: 12
- Goals scored: 76 (6.33 per match)
- Attendance: 15,750 (1,313 per match)
- Top scorer(s): (Mexico) Maribel Domínguez (6 goals)

The 2004 CONCACAF Women's Pre-Olympic Tournament qualification determined the five teams that joined Canada, Costa Rica and the United States at the 2004 CONCACAF Women's Pre-Olympic Tournament in Costa Rica.

== Teams ==
Originally, 17 teams entered the competition. Canada and the United States automatically qualified for the final tournament, along with hosts Costa Rica. Dominica later withdrew, and were replaced by Suriname. Following the qualifying draw, Puerto Rico and the U.S. Virgin Islands also withdrew.

Teams in bold qualified for the final tournament.

Zone	Automatic qualifiers	Teams entering qualification
North American Zone (NAFU)	**Canada**; **United States**	**Mexico**
Central American Zone (UNCAF)	**Costa Rica**	Belize; Guatemala; Honduras; Nicaragua; **Panama**
Caribbean Zone (CFU)		Cayman Islands; ~~Dominica~~; Dominican Republic; **Haiti**; **Jamaica**; ~~Puerto Rico~~; Suriname; **Trinidad and Tobago**; ~~U.S. Virgin Islands~~

== Caribbean Zone ==
=== Series A ===
Both matches were played in Paramaribo, Suriname. The Dominican Republic were originally drawn into the group, but were later moved to Group 3.

Team 1	Agg.	Team 2	1st leg	2nd leg
Suriname	2–6	**Trinidad and Tobago**	0–2	2–4

9 November 2003

Suriname	0–2	Trinidad and Tobago
	Report	Wilson 79' (o.g.); St. Louis 88'

André Kamperveen Stadion, Paramaribo
Attendance: 400
Referee: Esther Páez Álvarez (Cuba)
12 November 2003

Trinidad and Tobago	4–2	Suriname
Atthin-Johnson 9', 74'; Des Vignes 34', 38'	Report	Uliet 18', 41'

André Kamperveen Stadion, Paramaribo
Attendance: 300
Referee: Dianne Ferreira-James (Guyana)

Trinidad and Tobago won 6–2 on aggregate and qualified for the 2004 CONCACAF Women's Pre-Olympic Tournament.

=== Series B ===
Both matches were played in George Town, Cayman Islands. The U.S. Virgin Islands were originally drawn into the group, but later withdrew.

Team 1	Agg.	Team 2	1st leg	2nd leg
**Jamaica**	4–0	Cayman Islands	3–0	1–0

5 December 2003

Jamaica	3–0	Cayman Islands
Davis 75'; Reid 79'; Vincent 90+'	Report

Truman Bodden Sports Complex, George Town
Attendance: 800
Referee: Irasema Aguilera (Cuba)
7 December 2003

Cayman Islands	0–1	Jamaica
	Report	Reid 78'

Truman Bodden Sports Complex, George Town
Attendance: 1,000
Referee: Kari Seitz (United States)

Jamaica won 4–0 on aggregate and qualified for the 2004 CONCACAF Women's Pre-Olympic Tournament.

=== Series C ===
Both matches were played in San Cristóbal, Dominican Republic. Puerto Rico were originally drawn into the group, but later withdrew and were replaced by the Dominican Republic (who were moved from Group 1).

Team 1	Agg.	Team 2	1st leg	2nd leg
Dominican Republic	2–10	**Haiti**	0–7	2–3

31 October 2003

Dominican Republic	0–7	Haiti
	Report	Badio 1', 20'; Pierre 27', 87'; Bien-Aimé 42'; Marcellus 45'; Lundy 89'

Estadio Panamericano, San Cristóbal
Attendance: 100
Referee: Esther Páez Álvarez (Cuba)
2 November 2003

Haiti	3–2	Dominican Republic
Pierre 21'; Hilaire 55'; Ridore 88'	Report	Joseph 33'; J. Rodríguez 39'

Estadio Panamericano, San Cristóbal
Attendance: 1,000
Referee: Cassie Moore (Trinidad and Tobago)

Haiti won 10–2 on aggregate and qualified for the 2004 CONCACAF Women's Pre-Olympic Tournament.

== North/Central American Zone ==
=== Series D ===
All matches were played in Tegucigalpa, Honduras. Costa Rica were originally drawn into the group and selected to host the matches, but later were removed after replacing Mexico as the final tournament host. Mexico subsequently replaced Costa Rica in the group.

Pos	Team	Pld	W	D	L	GF	GA	GD	Pts	Qualification
1	Mexico	2	2	0	0	14	0	+14	**6**	Qualification to 2004 CONCACAF Pre-Olympic Tournament
2	Honduras (H)	2	1	0	1	1	6	−5	**3**	
3	Nicaragua	2	0	0	2	0	9	−9	**0**	

Source: CONCACAF
(H) Hosts
10 December 2003

Nicaragua	0–1	Honduras
	Report	Del Rosario 72'

Estadio Tiburcio Carías Andino, Tegucigalpa
Attendance: 2,500
Referee: Sonia Denoncourt (Canada)

12 December 2003

Mexico	8–0	Nicaragua
Domínguez 4', 16', 49', 60'; Pérez 9', 33'; Worbis 80'; González 85'	Report

Estadio Tiburcio Carías Andino, Tegucigalpa
Attendance: 2,000
Referee: Sandra Hunt (United States)

14 December 2003

Honduras	0–6	Mexico
	Report	Domínguez 13', 39'; Worbis 36'; Pérez 47'; Saucedo 83'; Contreras 90'

Estadio Tiburcio Carías Andino, Tegucigalpa
Attendance: 4,000
Referee: Sonia Denoncourt (Canada)

=== Series E ===
All matches were played in Guatemala City, Guatemala.

Pos	Team	Pld	W	D	L	GF	GA	GD	Pts	Qualification
1	Guatemala (H)	2	1	1	0	16	3	+13	**4**	Banned from final tournament (Note: Guatemala originally qualified for the final tournament, but were unable to participate after the National Football Federation of Guatemala was suspended by CONCACAF and FIFA in January 2004. As a result, group runners-up Panama instead took the spot at the final tournament.)
2	Panama	2	1	1	0	19	1	+18	**4**	Qualification to 2004 CONCACAF Pre-Olympic Tournament
3	Belize	2	0	0	2	2	33	−31	**0**	

Source: CONCACAF
(H) Hosts
Notes:
19 November 2003

Belize	0–18	Guatemala
	Report	M. de León 4', 29', 33', 37'; Cuéllar 14'; T. de León 20'; Pérez 24', 72', 90'; Suriana 35', 42', 52'; Busmester 44'; Vargas 54'; Wizel 61'; Flores 69' (o.g.); Barrera 79', 84'

Estadio Nacional Mateo Flores, Guatemala City
Attendance: 1,000
Referee: Delmy Genara Fuentes (El Salvador)

21 November 2003

Panama	15–2	Belize
Perea 4', 36', 45', 49'; Valderrama 17', 27', 77', 89'; Pérez 20'; González 34', 51'; Gutiérrez 35', 78'; Davis 37', 75'	Report	García 10'; Marr 81'

Estadio Nacional Mateo Flores, Guatemala City
Attendance: 150
Referee: María Ortega (El Salvador)

23 November 2003

Guatemala	1–1	Panama
Pérez 48'	Report	De Mera 45'

Estadio Nacional Mateo Flores, Guatemala City
Attendance: 2,500
Referee: Delmy Genara Fuentes (El Salvador)

== Goalscorers ==
There were 76 goals scored in 12 matches, for an average of 6.33 goals per match.

6 goals

- (Mexico) Maribel Domínguez

4 goals

- (Guatemala) Maria de León
- (Guatemala) Magnolia Pérez
- (Panama) Natalia Perea
- (Panama) Diana Valderrama

3 goals

- (Guatemala) Gladys Suriana
- (Haiti) Judith Pierre
- (Mexico) Patricia Pérez

2 goals

- (Guatemala) Marcela Barrera
- (Haiti) Fritzca Badio
- (Jamaica) Venicia Reid
- (Mexico) Guadalupe Worbis
- (Panama) Lisbeth Davis
- (Panama) Maxima González
- (Panama) Raiza Gutiérrez
- (Suriname) Denia Uliet
- (Trinidad and Tobago) Maylee Atthin-Johnson
- (Trinidad and Tobago) Natalie des Vignes

1 goal

- (Belize) Karen García
- (Belize) Carroll Marr
- (Dominican Republic) Dahiana Joseph
- (Dominican Republic) Jocelyn Rodríguez
- (Guatemala) Diana Busmester
- (Guatemala) Cándida Cuéllar
- (Guatemala) Tamara de León
- (Guatemala) Milvra Vargas
- (Guatemala) Susan Wizel
- (Haiti) Myrlande Bien-Aimé
- (Haiti) Fernande Hilaire
- (Haiti) Darline Lundy
- (Haiti) Guerda Marcellus
- (Haiti) Sherline Ridore
- (Honduras) María del Rosario
- (Jamaica) Omolyn Davis
- (Jamaica) Tashana Vincent
- (Mexico) Kristy Contreras
- (Mexico) Mónica González
- (Mexico) Luz Saucedo
- (Panama) Amarelis De Mera
- (Panama) Yoraidil Pérez
- (Trinidad and Tobago) Tasha St. Louis

1 own goal

- (Belize) Aretha Flores (against Guatemala)
- (Suriname) Glenoor Wilson (against Trinidad and Tobago)

Source: CONCACAF
