= 2004 CONCACAF Women's Pre-Olympic Tournament =

International football tournament

Tournament details
- Host country: Costa Rica
- Dates: 25 February – 5 March
- Teams: 8
- Venues: 2 (in 2 host cities)

Final positions
- Champions: United States (1st title)
- Runners-up: Mexico
- Third place: Canada
- Fourth place: Costa Rica

Tournament statistics
- Matches played: 16
- Goals scored: 81 (5.06 per match)
- Attendance: 27,616 (1,726 per match)
- Top scorer: (Mexico) Maribel Domínguez (9 goals)

The 2004 CONCACAF Women's Pre-Olympic Tournament was the first edition of the CONCACAF Women's Pre-Olympic Tournament, the quadrennial international football tournament organised by CONCACAF to determine which women's national teams from the North, Central American and Caribbean region qualify for the Olympic football tournament. The tournament was held in Costa Rica from 25 February to 5 March 2004.

The tournament was originally scheduled to be held in Mexico from 2 to 12 February 2004, but was later moved to Costa Rica.

The top two teams qualified for the 2004 Summer Olympics women's football tournament in Greece as the CONCACAF representatives. The United States won the final 3–2 against Mexico, with both teams qualifying for the Olympics.

== Qualification ==
Canada, Costa Rica and the United States automatically qualified for the final tournament. The remaining five berths were allocated to the five group winners of the qualification tournament.

=== Qualified teams ===
The following eight teams qualified for the final tournament. Mexico, the original hosts of the tournament, originally qualified automatically. However, after the tournament venue was changed, new hosts Costa Rica instead qualified automatically, while Mexico took Costa Rica's place in the qualifying competition.

Team	Zone	Method of qualification	Previous Olympics
Canada	NAFU	Automatic	0
Costa Rica	UNCAF	Automatic (host)	0
Haiti	CFU	Group 3 winner	0
Jamaica	CFU	Group 2 winner	0
Mexico	NAFU	Group 4 winner	0
Panama	UNCAF	Group 5 runner-up (Note: Panama replaced Guatemala after the National Football Federation of Guatemala was suspended by CONCACAF and FIFA in January 2004.)	0
Trinidad and Tobago	CFU	Group 1 winner	0
United States	NAFU	Automatic	2

== Venues ==
The matches were held at the Estadio Nacional, San José and the Estadio Eladio Rosabal Cordero, Heredia.

2004 CONCACAF Women's Pre-Olympic Tournament is located in Costa Rica	San José	Heredia
2004 CONCACAF Women's Pre-Olympic Tournament is located in Costa Rica	Estadio Nacional	Estadio Eladio Rosabal Cordero
2004 CONCACAF Women's Pre-Olympic Tournament is located in Costa Rica	Capacity: 25,000	Capacity: 8,700

== Group stage ==
The top two teams from each group advanced to the semi-finals.

All times are local, CST (UTC−6).

=== Tiebreakers ===
The ranking of teams in the group stage was determined as follows:

1. Points obtained in all group matches (three points for a win, one for a draw, none for a defeat);
2. Goal difference in all group matches;
3. Number of goals scored in all group matches;
4. Points obtained in the matches played between the teams in question;
5. Goal difference in the matches played between the teams in question;
6. Number of goals scored in the matches played between the teams in question;
7. Play-off on neutral ground.

=== Group A ===
Pos	Team	Pld	W	D	L	GF	GA	GD	Pts	Qualification
1	Canada	3	3	0	0	14	1	+13	9	Advance to knockout stage
2	Costa Rica (H)	3	2	0	1	8	3	+5	6	Advance to knockout stage
3	Panama	3	1	0	2	4	12	−8	3	
4	Jamaica	3	0	0	3	0	10	−10	0	

Source: CONCACAF
(H) Hosts
26 February 2004
18:00

Canada	6–0	Jamaica
Latham 32'; Hooper 42' (pen.); Sinclair 46', 61', 90+'; Moscato 82'	Report

Estadio Eladio Rosabal Cordero, Heredia
Attendance: 3,000
Referee: Dianne Ferreira-James (Guyana)
26 February 2004
20:00

Costa Rica	6–1	Panama
Campos 2'; Trujillo 25'; Chávez 26', 45'; Rodríguez 54'; Cruz 69'	Report	Bedoya 27'

Estadio Eladio Rosabal Cordero, Heredia
Attendance: 3,000
Referee: Sandra Hunt (United States)

28 February 2004
13:00

Panama	0–6	Canada
		Latham 14'; Jamani 20', 50', 66', 75'; Neil 25'

Estadio Nacional, San José
Attendance: 2,200
Referee: Sandra Hunt (United States)
28 February 2004
15:00

Costa Rica	1–0	Jamaica
Chávez 43'

Estadio Nacional, San José
Attendance: 2,200
Referee: Jillanta Proctor (Canada)

1 March 2004
18:00

Jamaica	0–3	Panama
	Report	Gutiérrez 74'; De Mera 85'; Bedoya 90'

Estadio Eladio Rosabal Cordero, Heredia
Attendance: 1,650
Referee: Shane de Silva (Trinidad and Tobago)
1 March 2004
20:00

Costa Rica	1–2	Canada
Cruz 60'	Report	Latham 7'; Jamani 21'

Estadio Eladio Rosabal Cordero, Heredia
Attendance: 1,650
Referee: María Ortega (El Salvador)

=== Group B ===
Pos	Team	Pld	W	D	L	GF	GA	GD	Pts	Qualification
1	United States	3	3	0	0	17	0	+17	9	Advance to knockout stage
2	Mexico	3	2	0	1	13	3	+10	6	Advance to knockout stage
3	Trinidad and Tobago	3	1	0	2	7	17	−10	3	
4	Haiti	3	0	0	3	2	19	−17	0	

Source: CONCACAF
25 February 2004
13:00

Mexico	5–0	Haiti
Pérez 7', 55', 63'; Domínguez 80', 84'	Report

Estadio Nacional, San José
Attendance: 1,500
Referee: Erica Vargas (Costa Rica)
25 February 2004
15:00

United States	7–0	Trinidad and Tobago
Boxx 22', 37', 82'; Lilly 25'; Hamm 40', 44'; Wambach 42'	Report

Estadio Nacional, San José
Attendance: 1,500
Referee: Jillanta Proctor (Canada)

27 February 2004
18:00

Mexico	8–1	Trinidad and Tobago
López 20'; Pérez 25', 55'; Mora 37'; Domínguez 38', 59', 73'; Martínez 80'	Report	St. Louis 42'

Estadio Eladio Rosabal Cordero, Heredia
Attendance: 350
Referee: María Ortega (El Salvador)
27 February 2004
20:00

Haiti	0–8	United States
	Report	Wagner 12'; Parlow 17', 72', 86'; Fenelon 42' (o.g.); MacMillan 47'; Tarpley 62'; Wambach 80'

Estadio Eladio Rosabal Cordero, Heredia
Attendance: 350
Referee: Shane de Silva (Trinidad and Tobago)

29 February 2004
13:00

Trinidad and Tobago	6–2	Haiti
Des Vignes 3', 38', 65'; Atthin-Johnson 8'; Elder 27'; James 82'	Report	Hilaire 32'; Ridore 89'

Estadio Nacional, San José
Attendance: 1,304
Referee: Erica Vargas (Costa Rica)
29 February 2004
15:00

United States	2–0	Mexico
Castillo 10' (o.g.); Wambach 26'	Report

Estadio Nacional, San José
Attendance: 1,304
Referee: Dianne Ferreira-James (Guyana)

== Knockout stage ==
=== Bracket ===
Semi-finals
3 March – San José
Canada	1
Mexico	2
3 March – San José
United States	4
Costa Rica	0

Final
5 March – Heredia
Mexico	2
United States	3
Third place play-off
5 March – Heredia
Canada	4
Costa Rica	0

=== Semi-finals ===
The semi-final winners qualified for the 2004 Summer Olympics.

3 March 2004
12:00

Canada	1–2	Mexico
Jamani 84'	Report	Domínguez 25', 59'

Estadio Nacional, San José
Attendance: 1,800
Referee: Dianne Ferreira-James (Guyana)

3 March 2004
14:30

United States	4–0	Costa Rica
Wagner 5'; Wambach 26'; Lilly 30'; Boxx 51'	Report

Estadio Nacional, San José
Attendance: 1,800
Referee: María Ortega (El Salvador)

=== Third place play-off ===
5 March 2004
17:30

Canada	4–0	Costa Rica
Sinclair 20', 78'; Hooper 43'; Jamani 58'	Report

Estadio Eladio Rosabal Cordero, Heredia
Attendance: 2,004
Referee: Sandra Hunt (United States)

=== Final ===
5 March 2004
20:00

Mexico	2–3	United States
Domínguez 9', 15'	Report	Tarpley 45'; Wambach 79'; Foudy 84'

Estadio Eladio Rosabal Cordero, Heredia
Attendance: 2,004
Referee: Jillanta Proctor (Canada)

== Goalscorers ==
There were 81 goals scored in 16 matches, for an average of 5.06 goals per match.

9 goals

- (Mexico) Maribel Domínguez

7 goals

- (Canada) Aysha Jamani

5 goals

- (Canada) Christine Sinclair
- (Mexico) Patricia Pérez
- (United States) Abby Wambach

4 goals

- (United States) Shannon Boxx

3 goals

- (Canada) Christine Latham
- (Costa Rica) Megan Chávez
- (Trinidad and Tobago) Natalie des Vignes
- (United States) Cindy Parlow

2 goals

- (Canada) Charmaine Hooper
- (Costa Rica) Shirley Cruz
- (Panama) Maritzenia Bedoya
- (United States) Mia Hamm
- (United States) Kristine Lilly
- (United States) Lindsay Tarpley
- (United States) Aly Wagner

1 goal

- (Canada) Carmelina Moscato
- (Canada) Andrea Neil
- (Costa Rica) Ana Gabriela Campos
- (Costa Rica) Cindy Rodríguez
- (Costa Rica) Gabriela Trujillo
- (Haiti) Fernande Hilaire
- (Haiti) Sherline Ridore
- (Mexico) Evelyn López
- (Mexico) Alma Martínez
- (Mexico) Iris Mora
- (Panama) Amarelis De Mera
- (Panama) Raiza Gutiérrez
- (Trinidad and Tobago) Maylee Atthin-Johnson
- (Trinidad and Tobago) Raeann Elder
- (Trinidad and Tobago) Leslie-Ann James
- (Trinidad and Tobago) Tasha St. Louis
- (United States) Julie Foudy
- (United States) Shannon MacMillan

1 own goal

- (Haiti) Judith Fenelon (against United States)
- (Mexico) María de Jesús Castillo (against United States)

Source: CONCACAF

== Best XI ==
The following players were included in CONCACAF's "Best XI" of the tournament.

Goalkeeper	Defenders	Midfielders	Forwards
(Canada) Karina LeBlanc	(Canada) Sharolta Nonen (Costa Rica) Gabriela Trujillo (United States) Joy Fawcett	(Costa Rica) Cindy Rodríguez (Mexico) Mónica Vergara (United States) Shannon Boxx (United States) Aly Wagner	(Costa Rica) Shirley Cruz (Mexico) Maribel Domínguez (United States) Abby Wambach
Honourable Mentions
(United States) Briana Scurry	(Costa Rica) Xiomara Briceño	(Canada) Diana Matheson (Jamaica) Alicia Wilson (Mexico) Patricia Pérez	(Canada) Aysha Jamani (Canada) Christine Sinclair

== Qualified teams for Summer Olympics ==
The following two teams from CONCACAF qualified for the 2004 Summer Olympic women's football tournament.

Team	Qualified on	Previous appearances in Summer Olympics^{1}
Mexico	3 March 2004	0 (debut)
United States	3 March 2004	2 (**1996**, 2000)

^{1} Bold indicates champions for that year. Italic indicates hosts for that year.
