= 2008 CONCACAF Women's Olympic Qualifying Tournament =

2nd edition of the CONCACAF Women's Olympic Qualifying Tournament

PREOLÍMPICO FEMENINO CONCACAF BEIJING 2008

Tournament details
- Host country: Mexico
- Dates: 2–12 April
- Teams: 6 (from 1 confederation)
- Venue: 1 (in 1 host city)

Final positions
- Champions: United States (2nd title)
- Runners-up: Canada
- Third place: Mexico
- Fourth place: Costa Rica

Tournament statistics
- Matches played: 10
- Goals scored: 37 (3.7 per match)
- Top scorer(s): (United States) Natasha Kai (Mexico) Juana Lopez (Canada) Melissa Tancredi (4 goals each)

The 2008 CONCACAF Women's Olympic Qualifying Tournament was the 2nd edition of the CONCACAF Women's Olympic Qualifying Tournament, the quadrennial international football tournament organised by CONCACAF to determine which two women's national teams from the North, Central American and Caribbean region qualify for the Olympic football tournament. A total of six teams played in the tournament. The top two teams of the tournament – United States and Canada – qualified for the 2008 Summer Olympics women's football tournament in Beijing, China as the CONCACAF representatives.

== Qualification ==
The six berths were allocated to the three regional zones as follows:

- Three teams from the North American Zone (NAFU), i.e., Canada, the hosts Mexico, and the United States, who all qualified automatically
- One team from the Central American Zone (UNCAF)
- Two teams from the Caribbean Zone (CFU)

Regional qualification tournaments were held to determine the three teams joining Canada, Mexico, and the United States at the final tournament.

=== Qualified teams ===
The following six teams qualified for the final tournament.

Team	Qualification	Appearance	Previous best performances	Previous women's Olympic appearances
North American Zone (NAFU)
Canada	Automatic	2nd	Third Place (2004)	0
Mexico	Automatic	2nd	Runner-up (2004)	1
United States	Automatic	2nd	Winner (2004)	3
Central American Zone (UNCAF)
Costa Rica	Group winner	2nd	Fourth Place (2004)	0
Caribbean Zone (CFU)
Trinidad and Tobago	Final round winner	2nd	Group stage (2004)	0
Jamaica	Final round 3rd place	1st	N/A	0

== Venue ==
The sole venue was the Estadio Olímpico Benito Juárez, Ciudad Juárez, Mexico.

Ciudad Juárez	Location of the host city of the 2008 CONCACAF Women's Olympic Qualifying Tournament.
Estadio Olímpico Benito Juárez	Location of the host city of the 2008 CONCACAF Women's Olympic Qualifying Tournament.
Capacity: 19,703	Location of the host city of the 2008 CONCACAF Women's Olympic Qualifying Tournament.

== Draw ==
The six teams were drawn into two groups of three teams. Defending CONCACAF Olympic Qualifying Championship champion and 2004 Olympic gold medalist United States were seeded in Group A.

== Group stage ==
The top two teams of each group advance to the semi-finals.

All times are local, CST (UTC−6).

=== Group A ===
Pos	Team	Pld	W	D	L	GF	GA	GD	Pts	Qualification
1	United States	2	2	0	0	9	1	+8	6	Advance to knockout stage
2	Mexico (H)	2	1	0	1	8	4	+4	3	Advance to knockout stage
3	Jamaica	2	0	0	2	1	14	−13	0	

Source: CONCACAF
(H) Hosts
2 April 2008

Mexico	8–1	Jamaica
López 18', 28', 36', 53'; Worbis 23'; Morales 25', 66'; Ocampo 80'	Report	Davis 58'

Estadio Olímpico Benito Juárez, Ciudad Juárez
Attendance: 20185
Referee: Jennifer Bennett (United States)

4 April 2008

Jamaica	0–6	United States
	Report	Lloyd 16'; Cheney 21'; Wambach 53' (pen.), 68'; O'Reilly 88'; Heath 90+5'

Estadio Olímpico Benito Juárez, Ciudad Juárez
Attendance: 5,853
Referee: Diane Ferreira-James (Guyana)

6 April 2008
19:30

United States	3–0	Mexico
Kai 14', 45'; Wambach 33'	Report

Estadio Olímpico Benito Juárez, Ciudad Juárez
Attendance: 22,280
Referee: Erika Vargas (Costa Rica)

=== Group B ===
Pos	Team	Pld	W	D	L	GF	GA	GD	Pts	Qualification
1	Canada	2	2	0	0	7	0	+7	6	Advance to knockout stage
2	Costa Rica	2	0	1	1	2	3	−1	1	Advance to knockout stage
3	Trinidad and Tobago	2	0	1	1	2	8	−6	1	

Source: CONCACAF
2 April 2008

Trinidad and Tobago	0–6	Canada
	Report	Tancredi 10'; Filigno 21'; Lang 39'; Hermus 61'; Robinson 68'; Sinclair 86'

Estadio Olímpico Benito Juárez, Ciudad Juárez
Attendance: 7,000
Referee: Monique Ras (Aruba)

4 April 2008

Costa Rica	2–2	Trinidad and Tobago
Wilson 21'; Granados 90+'	Report	Cordner 8'; Attin-Johnson 35'

Estadio Olímpico Benito Juárez, Ciudad Juárez
Attendance: 5,853
Referee: Carol Chennard (Canada)

6 April 2008

Canada	1–0	Costa Rica
Tancredi 15'	Report

Estadio Olímpico Benito Juárez, Ciudad Juárez
Attendance: 22,080
Referee: Kari Seitz (United States)

== Knockout stage ==
In the knockout stage, if a match is level at the end of regular time (two periods of 45 minutes), extra time is played (two periods of 15 minutes) and followed, if necessary, by a penalty shoot-out to determine the winner. In the case of the third place match, as it is played just before the final, extra time is skipped and a penalty shoot-out takes place.

=== Bracket ===
Semi-finals
9 April – Ciudad Juárez
Canada	1
Mexico	0
9 April – Ciudad Juárez
United States	3
Costa Rica	0

Final
12 April – Ciudad Juárez
Canada	1 (5)
United States (p)	1 (6)
Third place play-off
12 April – Ciudad Juárez
Mexico	1
Costa Rica	0

=== Semi-finals ===
Winners qualify for 2008 Summer Olympics.

9 April 2008

Canada	1–0	Mexico
Tancredi 25'	Report

Estadio Olímpico Benito Juárez, Ciudad Juárez
Attendance: 19,850
Referee: Kari Seitz (United States)
9 April 2008

United States	3–0	Costa Rica
Kai 57', 89'; O'Reilly 72'	Report

Estadio Olímpico Benito Juárez, Ciudad Juárez
Attendance: 19,850
Referee: Dianne Ferreira-James (Guyana)

=== Third place play-off ===
12 April 2008

Mexico	1–0	Costa Rica
Gordillo 69'	Report

Estadio Olímpico Benito Juárez, Ciudad Juárez
Attendance: 4,115
Referee: Carol Chennard (Canada)

=== Final ===
12 April 2008

Canada	1–1 (a.e.t.)	United States
Tancredi 116'	Report	Lloyd 108'
Penalties
Sinclair (penalty scored); Franko (penalty missed); Tancredi (penalty scored); Rustad (penalty scored); Lang (penalty scored); Wilkinson (penalty scored); Timko (penalty missed)	5–6	(penalty scored) Lloyd; (penalty scored) Hucles; (penalty missed) Chalupny; (penalty scored) Rampone; (penalty scored) Osborne; (penalty scored) Wambach; (penalty scored) O'Reilly

Estadio Olímpico Benito Juárez, Ciudad Juárez
Attendance: 4,115
Referee: Erika Vargas (Mexico)

== Goalscorers ==
4 goals

- (United States) Natasha Kai
- (Mexico) Juana López
- (Canada) Melissa Tancredi

3 goals

- (United States) Abby Wambach

2 goals

- (United States) Carli Lloyd
- (Mexico) Tania Morales
- (United States) Heather O'Reilly
- (Mexico) Teresa Worbis

1 goal

- (Canada) Jonelle Filigno
- (Canada) Randee Hermus
- (Canada) Kara Lang
- (Canada) Jodi Ann Robinson
- (Canada) Christine Sinclair
- (Costa Rica) Cristín Granados
- (Costa Rica) Amara Wilson
- (Jamaica) Omolyn Davis
- (Mexico) María Gordillo
- (Mexico) Mónica Ocampo
- (Trinidad and Tobago) Kennya Cordner
- (Trinidad and Tobago) Maylee Attin-Johnson
- (United States) Lauren Cheney
- (United States) Tobin Heath
