= Natalie Garcia =

Natalie Garcia may refer to:

- Natalie Garcia (footballer) (born 1990), American-born Mexican footballer
- Natalie Garcia (gymnast) (born 2003), Canadian rhythmic gymnast
