= Augsburg Arena =

Football stadium in Augsburg, Germany

WWK Arena

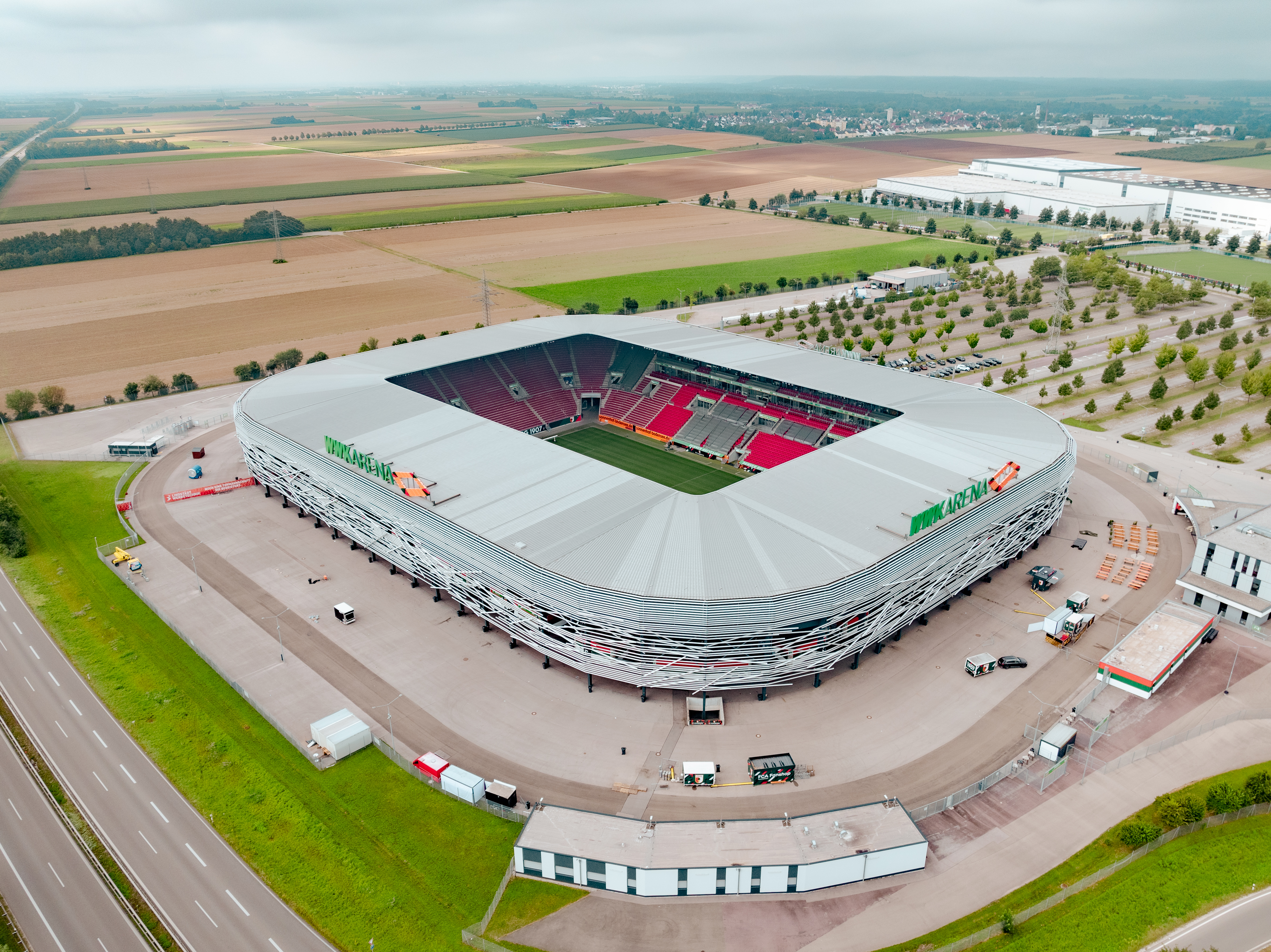
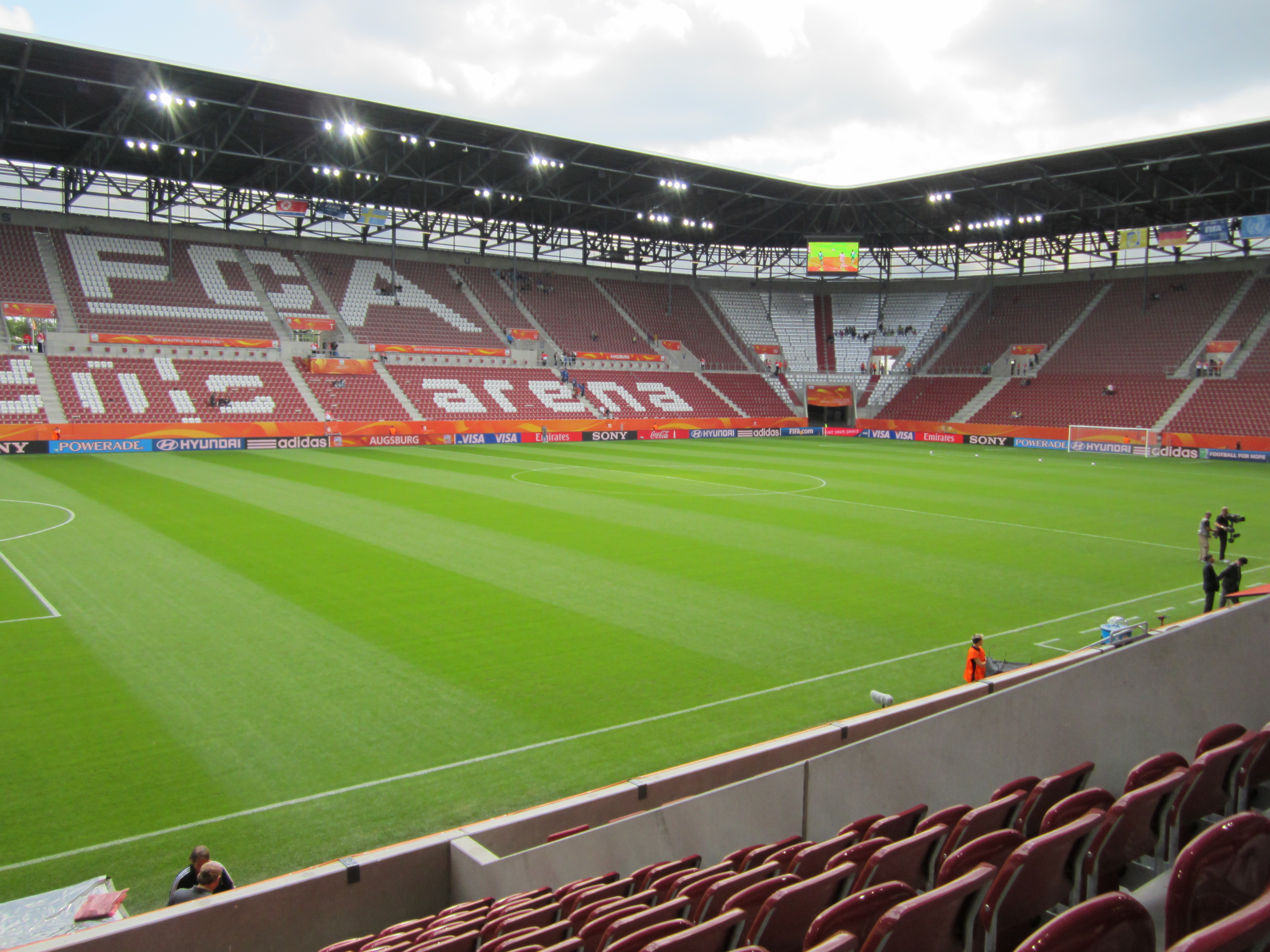
- Interactive map of WWK Arena
- Former names: Augsburg Arena (2006–2009); Impuls Arena (2009–2011); SGL Arena (2011–2015)
- Location: Augsburg, Germany
- Coordinates: 48°19′23″N 10°53′10″E
- Owner: FC Augsburg
- Capacity: 30,660 (league matches), 28,367 (international matches)
- Surface: grass

Construction
- Opened: 26 July 2009
- Cost: €45 million
- Architects: Bernhard & Kögl

Tenants
- FC Augsburg (2009–present); Germany national football team (selected matches)

Augsburg Arena, currently known commercially as the WWK Arena (German pronunciation: [ˌveːveːˈkaː ʔaˌʁeːnaː]; officially stylised as WWK ARENA, also "Schwabenstadion"), is a football stadium in Augsburg, Bavaria, Germany. It is used mostly for football matches and hosts the home matches of FC Augsburg.

== History ==
The stadium has a capacity of 30,660 with 19,060 seats and standing room for 11,034. A second phase of construction could expand capacity to 49,000 in the future. It replaced the club's previous home stadium, Rosenaustadion. FC Augsburg played their first match in the new stadium in 2009.

During the time of designing and constructing the stadium, it was called "Augsburg Arena" [ˈaʊksbʊʁk ʔaˌʁeːna]. It was opened as "Impuls Arena" ([ɪmˈpʊls ʔaˌʁeːna], officially stylised as impuls arena), and was renamed "SGL Arena" ([ˌɛsɡeːˈʔɛl ʔaˌʁeːna], officially stylised as SGL arena) after SGL Carbon acquired the naming rights for the structure in May 2011. The contract had a term of seven years and began on 1 July 2011. On 1 July 2015 the stadium naming rights were acquired by WWK, an insurance company, changing the official name of the stadium to "WWK ARENA".

Augsburg was one of the official host cities of the 2010 FIFA U-20 Women's World Cup and the subsequent 2011 FIFA Women's World Cup. The Impuls arena was the location of several matches during the group stage and the quarterfinals. During the FIFA-competitions it was renamed "FIFA Women's World Cup Stadium Augsburg". The stadium has hosted one Germany national team game and was nicknamed the "Anfield of the B17 highway" following FCA's 2016 Europa League Last 32 First Leg clash with Liverpool.

=== Climate neutrality ===
WWK Arena is the first climate-neutral football stadium in the world. The carbon neutrality was achieved by six ecological heat pumps (40 m deep), which produce the desired temperature via heat exchangers. A bio natural gas boiler also supplies the necessary energy during peak load times at a game. In 2017, a new stadium facade will be made for the WWK Arena.

== 2011 FIFA Women's World Cup ==
Date	Time (CET)	Team #1	Result	Team #2	Round	Spectators
29 June 2011	15:00	Norway	1–0	Equatorial Guinea	Group D	12,928
2 July 2011	14:00	North Korea	0–1	Sweden	Group C	23,768
5 July 2011	18:15	England	2–0	Japan	Group B	20,777
10 July 2011	13:00	Sweden	3–1	Australia	Quarter-finals	24,605

== Gallery ==
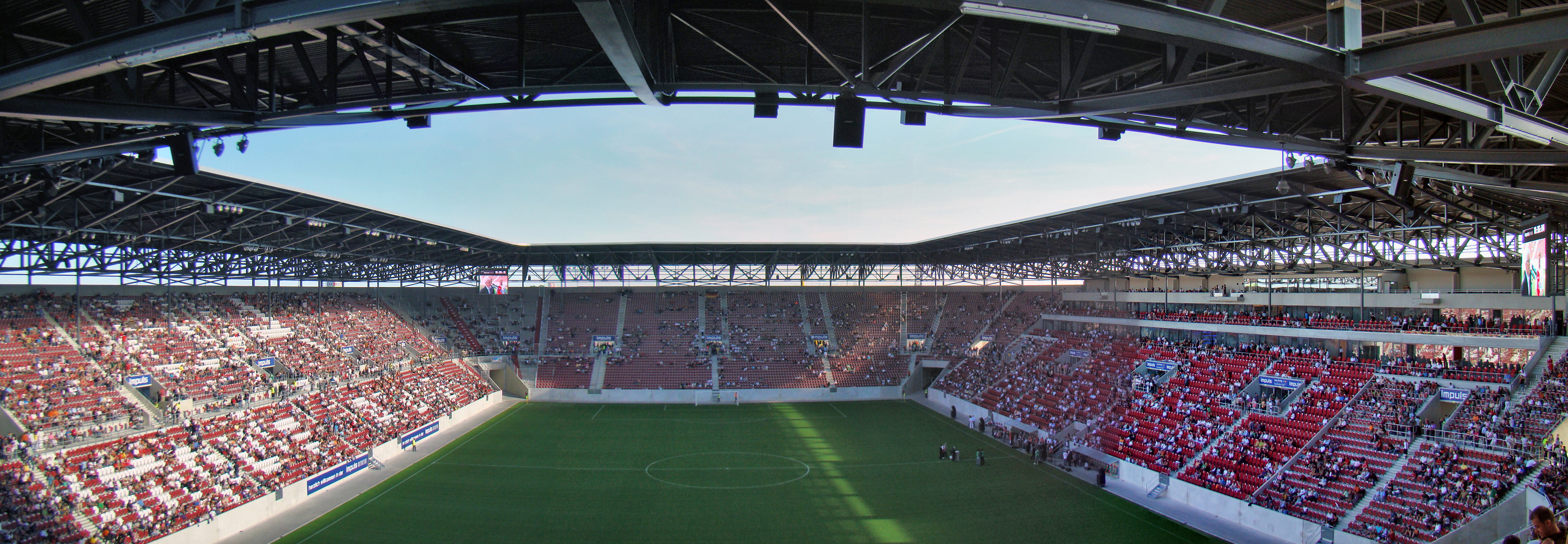
The SGL Arena in 2009
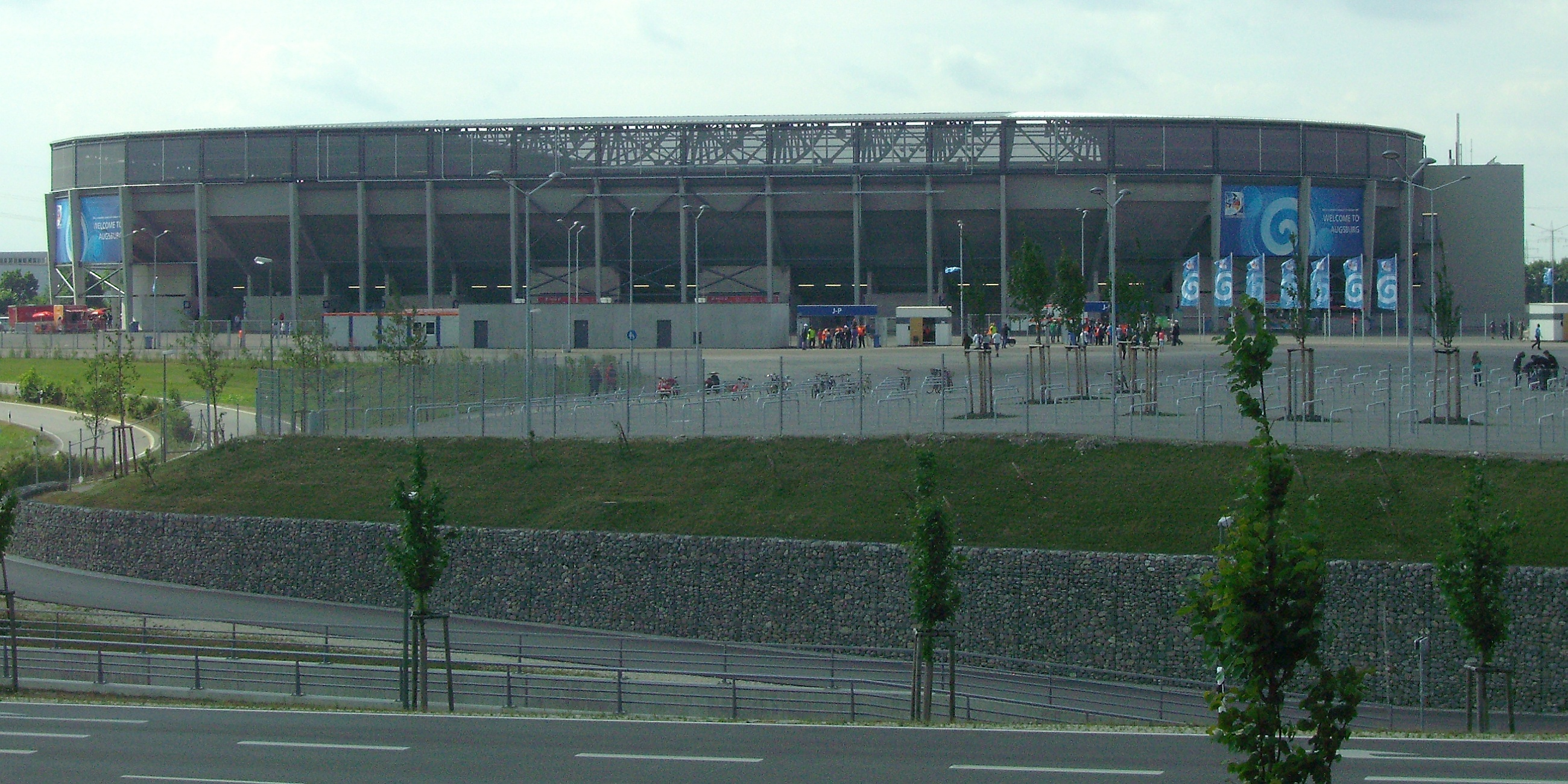
