= Scoop Stanisic =

Soccer player (born 1978)

Personal information
- Full name: Vojislav Stanišić
- Date of birth: March 6, 1978 (age 48)
- Place of birth: Belgrade, SR Serbia, SFR Yugoslavia
- Height: 6 ft 3 in (1.91 m)
- Position: Goalkeeper

Senior career*
Years	Team	Apps	(Gls)
1983–1984	Partizan	0	(0)
1984–1985	New York Cosmos (indoor)	3	(0)
1985–1987	Chicago Sting (indoor)	24	(0)
1988	Baltimore Blast (indoor)	1	(0)
1988–1989	Hershey Impact (indoor)	32	(0)
1989–1990	Baltimore Blast (indoor)	24	(0)
1990–1991	Hershey Impact (indoor)		
1989	Albany Capitals		
1990	Washington Diplomats		
1991	Albany Capitals	19	(0)
1991–1992	Illinois Thunder (indoor)	24	(0)
1992	Miami Freedom	15	(0)
1992–1994	Kansas City Attack (indoor)	41	(0)
1994	Baltimore Bays		
1994–1997	Harrisburg Heat (indoor)	80	(0)
1995	Albany Alleycats		
1997–1999	Kansas City Attack (indoor)	38	(0)
2000–2001	Detroit Rockers (indoor)	8	(0)
2005	Chicago Storm (indoor)	0	(0)

International career
1993	United States	1	(0)

Managerial career
- 1996: Franklin & Marshall College
- 2000: Vermont Voltage
- 2012–: Columbus Crew (goalkeeping coach)
- * Club domestic league appearances and goals

Vojislav "Scoop" Stanisic (Serbian: Војислав Станишић / Vojislav Stanišić; born March 6, 1978) is a retired soccer player who played as a goalkeeper. He was most recently the goalkeeping coach for Columbus Crew in Major League Soccer. He spent most of his career playing indoor soccer in the United States, but also played five outdoor seasons in the American Soccer League, American Professional Soccer League and USISL. He earned one cap with the US national team in 1993.

== Club career ==
Stanisic, born in Belgrade, Serbia, Yugoslavia, began playing soccer with Partizan. Although he made no appearance in the Yugoslav First League, he played a total of 56 games for Partizan, two of which were in the Yugoslav Cup. In 1984, Stanisic moved to the United States where he signed with the New York Cosmos. While the Cosmos had gained its reputation as a top outdoor team in the North American Soccer League, that league had folded and the Cosmos had moved to the Major Indoor Soccer League (MISL). Stanisic and the Cosmos began the 1984-1985 MISL season, but the team's finances led to its leaving the league before the end of the season and folding a few weeks later. Stanisic then moved to the Chicago Sting, another ex-NASL team now playing in MISL. He spent two seasons in Chicago before moving to the Baltimore Blast in 1988. In 1988, Stanisic moved to the Hershey Impact of the American Indoor Soccer Association (AISA). On November 8, 1990, the Blast released Stanisic. The San Diego Sockers expressed an interest in signing Stanisic, but he chose to return to the Hershey Impact. He then moved to the Illinois Thunder of the National Professional Soccer League (NPSL) for the 1991–1992 season. He then moved to the Kansas City Attack (NPSL) for two seasons. However, Stanisic was plagued by injuries during the 1993–1994 season and was traded to the Harrisburg Heat during the 1994 off-season. In April 1995, he joined the Albany Alleycats for the summer outdoor season. Stanisic experienced a rejuvenation with the Heat and was named a second team All Star for the 1995–1996 season. Stanisic only played four games for the Heat during the 1997–1998 season when the Attack purchased his contract on December 1, 1997, with cash and a pick in the upcoming Amateur Draft. He played out the rest of the 1997–1998 season in Kansas City, seeing time in twenty-eight games. In the 1998–1999 season, he played in only ten games and is not listed on any team's roster for the 1999–2000 season. In 2000, Stanisic joined the Detroit Rockers where he played only eight games before retiring at the end of the 2000–2001 season. On March 31, 2005, the Chicago Storm of the Major Indoor Soccer League signed Stanisic to a fifteen-day contract after injuries had decimated the Storm's goalkeeper corps. However, he played no games during those fifteen days before retiring permanently. Stanisic finished his NPSL career sixth on the all time goalkeeper wins list with 127. While Stanisic made his reputation in indoor soccer, he also played several seasons of outdoor soccer in the U.S. In 1989, he signed with the Albany Capitals of the American Soccer League (ASL). In 1990, he was with the Washington Diplomats of the American Professional Soccer League (APSL). The APSL was formed by the merger of the ASL and the Western Soccer League in 1989. He was back with the Capitals in 1991, then spent the 1992 APSL season with the Miami Freedom. In 1994, Stanisic returned to outdoor soccer with the Baltimore Bays of the USISL.

== International career ==
Stanisic earned one cap with the U.S. national team in a 2–2 tie with El Salvador on March 23, 1993. Already 30 years old at this point he was called up by head coach Bora Milutinović.

== Coaching career ==
In 1996, Stanisic became the women's soccer head coach NCAA Div III Franklin & Marshall College in Lancaster, Pennsylvania. He spent only one year with the team, going 8–6–0. In 1998, Stanisic formed the KC Inter Soccer Club, a youth club in Lee's Summit, Missouri. He remained with the club until 2005 when he was hired by the Chicago Storm. In 2000, he coached the U.S. Fourth Division Vermont Voltage.

Stanisic signed as goalkeeping coach for Columbus Crew of Major League Soccer in February 2012. He was let go in 2013 when Robert Warzycha was fired.

He is currently the goalkeeper director for Rise SC, a youth soccer club based in Houston, TX.

== Administrative career ==
In 2001, Stanisic was the general manager of the Kansas City Mystics, a women's team competing in the W-League. In the Spring of 2005, Scoop accepted a permanent front office/coaching position with the Chicago Storm (MISL).
