= 2007 FIFA Women's World Cup qualification (AFC–CONCACAF play-off) =

- Event: 2007 FIFA Women's World Cup qualification
Japan	Mexico
(Japan)	(Mexico)
3	2
- on aggregate

First leg
Japan	Mexico
2	0
- Date: 10 March 2007
- Venue: National Stadium, Tokyo
- Referee: Christine Beck (Germany)
- Attendance: 10,107

Second leg
Mexico	Japan
2	1
- Date: 17 March 2007
- Venue: Estadio Nemesio Díez, Toluca
- Referee: Nicole Petignat (Switzerland)
- Attendance: 20,000

The AFC–CONCACAF play-off of the 2007 FIFA Women's World Cup qualification competition was a two-legged home-and-away tie that decided one spot in the final tournament in China. The play-off was contested by the fourth-placed team from the AFC, Japan, and the third-placed team from CONCACAF, Mexico.

== Qualified teams ==
Confederation	Placement	Team
AFC	2006 AFC Women's Asian Cup 4th place	Japan
CONCACAF	2006 CONCACAF Women's Gold Cup 3rd place	Mexico

== Summary ==
The draw for the order of legs was held at the Westin Hotel in Tokyo, Japan on 15 December 2006.

Team 1	Agg.	Team 2	1st leg	2nd leg
Japan	3–2	Mexico	2–0	1–2

== Matches ==
10 March 2007
14:00 UTC+9

Japan	2–0	Mexico
Sawa 37'; Miyama 69'	Report

National Stadium, Tokyo
Attendance: 10,107
Referee: Christine Beck (Germany)
17 March 2007
12:00 UTC−6

Mexico	2–1	Japan
Leyva 18' (pen.); Domínguez 29'	Report	Arakawa 12'

Estadio Nemesio Díez, Toluca
Attendance: 20,000
Referee: Nicole Petignat (Switzerland)

Japan won 3–2 on aggregate and qualified for 2007 FIFA Women's World Cup.

== Goalscorers ==
There were 5 goals scored in 2 matches, for an average of 2.5 goals per match.

1 goal

- (Japan) Eriko Arakawa
- (Japan) Aya Miyama
- (Japan) Homare Sawa
- (Mexico) Maribel Domínguez
- (Mexico) Fátima Leyva
