= Kansas City Mystics =

Kansas City Mystics were a W-League women's soccer team that played their home games at the Blue Valley School District Athletic Complex in Overland Park, Kansas, United States.

The team's coach, and general manager was Scoop Stanisic The team ceased operations in 2002 after posting an 11–2 regular season record. The roster included college and international players, some of whom went on to play for their country's national team, Women's United Soccer Association, and Canadian professional teams. Most notable is perhaps Maribel Dominguez from Mexico whose signing with a men's professional team led to a ruling by FIFA banning her participation in men's matches.

== 2002 Kansas City Mystics Roster ==
No. Name Pos. Age Nationality

- 1 Suzie Grech G 20 USA
- 2 Leah Sims D 21 USA
- 4 Pardis Brown D 21 USA
- 5 Lacey Woolf D 20 USA
- 6 Kamille Rosenfalck D 24 Denmark
- 7 Pamela Bedzrah F 23 England
- 8 Roseli M 31 Brazil
- 9 Maribel "Marigol" Dominguez F 23 Mexico
- 10 Iris Mora F 20 Mexico
- 11 Nildinja M 30 Brazil
- 14 Gillian Samuel D 23 Canada
- 15 Shannon DeVos M 20 USA
- 16 Amy Sullivant M 21 USA
- 17 Tennli Ulicny M 21 USA
- 18 Leigh Clark D 22 USA
- 19 Kallie Cox D 18 USA
- 21 Patrica Perez M 23 Mexico
- 22 Abby Crumpton F 21 USA
- 23 Brooke Jones M 21 USA
- 99 Jenny Willemse G 22 USA
