= 2007 FIFA Women's World Cup qualification =

2007 FIFA Women's World Cup Qualification
Tournament details
- Dates: 12 June 2005 – 17 March 2007
- Teams: 120 (from 6 confederations)

Qualification for the 2007 FIFA Women's World Cup determined which 15 teams joined China, the hosts of the 2007 tournament, to play for the Women's World Cup. Europe had 5 qualifying berths, Asia 3.5 berths (including the hosts), North and Central America 2.5 berths, Africa 2 berths, South America 2 berths and Oceania 1 berth. The 16th spot was determined through a play-off match between the third-placed teams in North/Central America and Asia.

== Africa ==
The 2006 Women's African Football Championship functioned as a qualifying tournament. Originally, this tournament was scheduled to be held in Gabon, but due to "organisational reasons" Gabon withdrew from hosting the competition. 32 teams entered the African Championships and competed for the two available spots, but six withdrew during the qualifying session.

On 7 November 2006, Nigeria and Ghana qualified by virtue of winning their semifinal matches.

== Asia ==
The 2006 AFC Women's Asian Cup functioned as a qualifying tournament. The tournament was originally scheduled to be held in Japan, but after the Football Federation Australia moved from the Oceania Football Confederation to the Asian Football Confederation, the Australian team entered the qualifying series. They were awarded hosting rights in February 2006. The Championship took place between 16 July 2006 and 30 July 2006. Since China, the host nation of Women's World Cup 2007, proceeded to the final, another finalist, Australia and third-placed North Korea, were qualified for the World Cup finals. Fourth-placed Japan qualified for a play-off match with Mexico, the third-placed team from the 2006 CONCACAF Women's Gold Cup.

== Europe ==
The 25 teams belonging to the First Category of European women's football were drawn into five groups, from which the group winners qualified for the World Cup finals. The qualifiers concluded on 30 September 2006 with Norway, Sweden, Germany, Denmark and England qualifying.

== North America, Central America & Caribbean ==
The 2006 Women's Gold Cup acted as qualifier tournament for CONCACAF. The tournament finals took place between 19 and 26 November 2006. USA and Canada received direct qualifying spots after contesting the final of the 2002 Gold Cup, while four other spots were determined through regional qualifying.

On 22 November 2006, United States and Canada qualified by virtue of winning their semifinal matches, while Mexico qualified for a play-off match with Japan after defeating Jamaica in the 2006 Gold Cup 3rd place match.

== Oceania ==
One spot was awarded to the winner of the 2007 OFC Women's Championship held 9 April through 13 April 2007 in Papua New Guinea.

New Zealand won this tournament and qualified for the 2007 FIFA Women's World Cup. It is the second time they are part of the FIFA Women's World Cup, the other being in 1991.

== South America ==
The 2006 Sudamericano Femenino acted as qualifier for CONMEBOL. Originally, a women's football tournament at the 2006 South American Games in Buenos Aires would serve as qualifier tournament, but the South American Games committee scrapped football from the games, forcing the Argentine Football Association to organize a tournament on short notice.

On 24 November, Brazil qualified by earning six points. Argentina qualified on 26 November by defeating Brazil and earning a total of 7, thus winning the tournament.

== AFC–CONCACAF play-off ==
The draw for the order of legs was held at the Westin Hotel in Tokyo, Japan on 15 December 2006.

| Team 1 | Agg. | Team 2 | 1st leg | 2nd leg |
|---|---|---|---|---|
| Japan | 3–2 | Mexico | 2–0 | 1–2 |

== Qualified teams ==
The following teams qualified for the tournament:

| Team | Number of appearances incl. 2007 | Record streak | First appearance | Most recent appearance before 2007 | Previous best performance |
|---|---|---|---|---|---|
| Argentina | 2 | 2 | 2003 | 2003 | Round 1 |
| Australia | 4 | 4 | 1995 | 2003 | Round 1 |
| Brazil | 5 | 5 | 1991 | 2003 | 3rd Place (1999) |
| Canada | 4 | 4 | 1995 | 2003 | 4th Place (2003) |
| China | 5 | 5 | 1991 | 2003 | Runners-up (1999) |
| Denmark | 4 | 3 | 1991 | 1999 | Quarterfinals (1991 and 1995) |
| England | 2 | 1 | 1995 | 1995 | Quarterfinals (1995) |
| Germany | 5 | 5 | 1991 | 2003 | Champions (2003) |
| Ghana | 3 | 3 | 1999 | 2003 | Round 1 |
| Japan | 5 | 5 | 1991 | 2003 | Quarterfinals (1995) |
| North Korea | 3 | 3 | 1999 | 2003 | Round 1 |
| New Zealand | 2 | 1 | 1991 | 1991 | Round 1 |
| Nigeria | 5 | 5 | 1991 | 2003 | Quarterfinals (1999) |
| Norway | 5 | 5 | 1991 | 2003 | Champions (1995) |
| Sweden | 5 | 5 | 1991 | 2003 | Runners-up (2003) |
| United States | 5 | 5 | 1991 | 2003 | Champions (1991 and 1999) |

Every qualifier had participated in a previous Women's World Cup. To date, the 2007 Women's World Cup is the only World Cup for either men or women in which every team in the final tournament had played in a previous World Cup final tournament.
