= Amara Wilson =

Costa Rican footballer (born 1985)

Personal information
- Full name: Amara Louise Wilson Ruth
- Date of birth: 25 May 1985 (age 41)
- Place of birth: Tamarindo, Costa Rica
- Height: 1.68 m (5 ft 6 in)
- Position: Forward

College career
Years	Team	Apps	(Gls)
2004–2008	Colorado College Tigers	19	(22)

International career^{‡}
	Costa Rica	25	(12)
- ‡ National team caps and goals as of 4 April 2008

Amara Louise Wilson Ruth (born 25 May 1985) is a Costa Rican former footballer who played as a forward. Throughout her career she was named Costa Rica's best female soccer player and top goal scoring forward as well as the first player to leave her country to play abroad in the United States. She helped open the path for other Costa Rican players to play abroad. She has been a member of the Costa Rica women's national team.

== Early life ==
Wilson was raised in Tamarindo, Costa Rica. She played for various teams throughout her life. Amara was an all time athlete in school and participated in several sports: basketball, soccer, tennis volleyball, martial arts, and cross country. She is a black belt in Tae Kwon Do. Amara quickly became the face of women's soccer in Costa Rica, appearing in a famous soccer commercial for Dos Pinos with members of the men's national soccer team. The commercial was the first of its kind and helped provide recognition for women's soccer in Costa Rica. Amara was selected by Greg Ryan (former U.S. National Women's Soccer Coach) to play for Colorado College on a full soccer scholarship where she became a star for the Tigers throughout her college career.

== International goals ==
Scores and results list Costa Rica's goal tally first

No.	Date	Venue	Opponent	Score	Result	Competition	Ref
1	4 April 2008	Estadio Olímpico Benito Juárez, Ciudad Juárez, Mexico	Trinidad and Tobago	1–1	2–2	2008 CONCACAF Women's Pre-Olympic Tournament	
