= Natalie Vinti =

American-born Mexican footballer (born 1988)

Personal information
- Full name: Natalie Raquel Vinti Nuño
- Date of birth: 2 January 1988 (age 38)
- Place of birth: San Diego, California, U.S.
- Height: 1.74 m (5 ft 9 in)
- Positions: Defender; midfielder

College career
Years	Team	Apps	(Gls)
2006–2008	San Diego Toreros	63	(2)

International career^{‡}
2010–2011	Mexico	22	(0)
- ‡ National team caps and goals as of 17 June 2011 (before the 2011 FIFA Women's World Cup)

Natalie Raquel Vinti Nuño (born January 2, 1988) is an American-born Mexican former international footballer. She played for San Diego Toreros in the NCAA Division I Women's Soccer Championship, and the Mexico national team. Mainly a centre-back, she can also operate as a midfielder.
