= Aysha Jamani =

Canadian socker player (born 1987)

Personal information
- Date of birth: June 28, 1987 (age 39)
- Place of birth: Sarnia, Ontario, Canada
- Height: 1.60 m (5 ft 3 in)
- Position: Forward

Youth career
- Western Canada RedHawks
- 2004: Southwest United

College career
Years	Team	Apps	(Gls)
2005–2008	Nebraska Cornhuskers		

Senior career*
Years	Team	Apps	(Gls)
2004–2005	Edmonton Aviators		

International career
2004	Canada U19	9	(6)
2006	Canada U20	8	(4)
2004–2006	Canada	11	(7)
- * Club domestic league appearances and goals

Aysha Jamani (born June 28, 1987) is a Canadian former soccer player who played as a forward. She represented Canada 11 times for the senior team whilst representing the University of Nebraska–Lincoln.

== International goals ==
No.	Date	Venue	Opponent	Score	Result	Competition
1.	28 February 2004	Heredia, Costa Rica	Panama	2–0	6–0	2004 CONCACAF Women's Pre-Olympic Tournament
2.	28 February 2004	Heredia, Costa Rica	Panama	4–0	6–0	2004 CONCACAF Women's Pre-Olympic Tournament
3.	28 February 2004	Heredia, Costa Rica	Panama	5–0	6–0	2004 CONCACAF Women's Pre-Olympic Tournament
4.	28 February 2004	Heredia, Costa Rica	Panama	6–0	6–0	2004 CONCACAF Women's Pre-Olympic Tournament
5.	1 March 2004	Heredia, Costa Rica	Costa Rica	2–0	2–1	2004 CONCACAF Women's Pre-Olympic Tournament
6.	3 March 2004	San José, Costa Rica	Mexico	1–2	1–2	2004 CONCACAF Women's Pre-Olympic Tournament
7.	5 March 2004	Heredia, Costa Rica	Costa Rica	3–0	4–0	2004 CONCACAF Women's Pre-Olympic Tournament
