= Melissa Tancredi =

Canadian soccer player (born 1981)

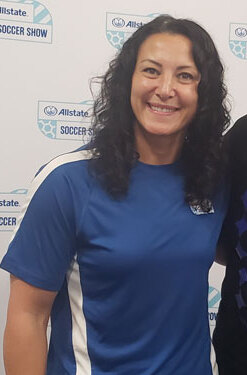
- Tancredi in 2024

Personal information
- Full name: Melissa Palma Julie Tancredi
- Date of birth: December 27, 1981 (age 44)
- Place of birth: Ancaster, Ontario, Canada
- Height: 1.77 m (5 ft 9 1/2 in)
- Position: Striker

Youth career
- Burlington Sting

College career
Years	Team	Apps	(Gls)
2000–2004	Notre Dame Fighting Irish	82	(14)

Senior career*
Years	Team	Apps	(Gls)
2004	Detroit Jaguars	10	(2)
2005–2006	Atlanta Silverbacks	15	(7)
2007	Jersey Sky Blue	2	(0)
2007	River Cities Futbol Club	0	(0)
2009	Saint Louis Athletica	14	(0)
2010	Vancouver Whitecaps	9	(5)
2011	Piteå IF	8	(2)
2012	Dalsjöfors GoIF	5	(2)
2014–2015	Chicago Red Stars	21	(5)
2016	KIF Örebro DFF	16	(8)
2018–2019	North Shore GSC Renegades		(5)
2019–2022	Fusion FC		(13)
Total		172	(31)

International career^{‡}
2004–2017	Canada	125	(27)
Medal record
Olympic Games
Bronze medal – third place	2012 London	Team
Bronze medal – third place	2016 Rio de Janeiro	Team
Pan American Games
Bronze medal – third place	2007 Rio de Janeiro	Team
- * Club domestic league appearances and goals as of September 7, 2016 ‡ National team caps and goals as of November 23, 2019

Melissa Palma Julie Tancredi (born December 27, 1981) is a Canadian retired soccer forward who played for the Canada women's national soccer team. She won a bronze medal at the 2012 Olympics when Canada defeated France 1–0 in the bronze medal match. Tancredi won bronze again after Canada defeated Brazil 2–1 at the 2016 Olympics. Her nickname is "Tanc".

== Early life ==
Tancredi was born in Ancaster, Ontario, to parents Peter and Ann-Marie Tancredi, her father being Italian-born from Ascoli Piceno. She began playing soccer at age four. She played soccer, volleyball, and track at Cathedral High School in Hamilton, Ontario. She was named soccer MVP and senior athlete of the year during her senior year.

Tancredi played for the under-19 provincial team and Burlington Sting club program. She helped the Burlington Sting win the Canadian title and Ontario Cup and was named the Most Valuable Player (MVP) of the Burlington Sting in 1999.

== College career ==
Tancredi attended the University of Notre Dame in the U.S. from 2000 to 2004 where she majored in anthropology and pre-medicine studies. She played on the school's soccer team, but she was sidelined her first year due to an anterior cruciate ligament injury.

In 2003, Tancredi was named First Team All-American, Second Team All-American, NSCAA Second Team All-Region, Big East Defensive Player of the Year, and First Team All-Big East Conference. She was a finalist for the MAC Hermann Trophy.

In 2004, Tancredi returned to Notre Dame after being awarded a fifth year of eligibility and was named as tri-captain. She helped lead the Irish to the NCAA National Championship and was named First Team All-American, Second Team All-American, First Team All-Big East, and Big East Defensive Player of the Year for a second straight season.

== Club career ==
In 2004, Tancredi played with the Detroit Jaguars in the W-League, scoring two goals and providing two assists in ten games played. From 2005 to 2006, she played for the Atlanta Silverbacks Women in the W-League and was named to the 2005 W-League All-League team.

In 2009, Tancredi played for the Saint Louis Athletica in the Women's Professional Soccer league. In 2010, she joined the Vancouver Whitecaps FC in the W-League and led the team with six goals and two assists, The team was undefeated in the regular season and had a spot in the W-League's final four.

In 2011, Tancredi was a member of the Piteå IF in Sweden. In 2012, she played with the Swedish team Dalsjöfors GoIF. In 2014, she was allocated to the expansion Houston Dash by Canadian national team coach John Herdman, but was traded to the Chicago Red Stars for fellow Canadian international Erin McLeod before the Dash's expansion draft.

== International career ==
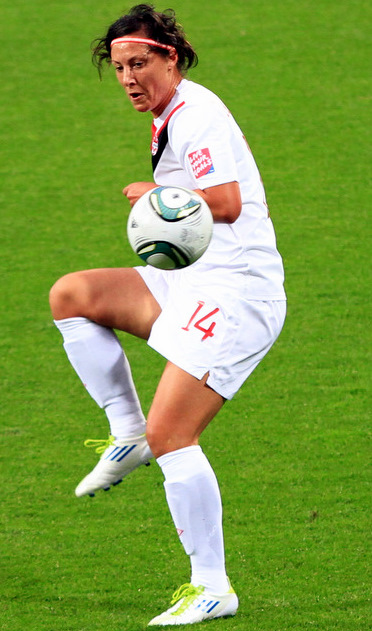
Tancredi playing for Canada in 2011

Tancredi was a member of the Canadian U19 national team and trained in British Columbia with the U20 national team in 2000. She was also a member of the 1999 national 'B' training team.

Tancredi made her debut with Canada as a central back, starting in all five games of the 2004 Olympic qualifying tournament in Costa Rica. Canada had 6–0 wins over Jamaica and Panama, two wins over Costa Rica (2–1, 4–0), and a 2–1 loss to Mexico that cost the Canadians a spot at the Olympic Games. Tancredi had previously been invited to play with the Canadian national team at the 2000 Algarve Cup in Portugal.

Tancredi was part of the Canadian team that finished second to the United States at the 2006 CONCACAF Women's Gold Cup. In 2007, Tancredi scored the second-fastest goal in World Cup history (just 37 seconds from the start of the September game against Australia) in her first game at the 2007 FIFA Women's World Cup in China.

Tancredi won a bronze medal at the 2007 Pan American Games. She played for 199 minutes (starting three games) at the 2011 FIFA Women's World Cup. She was part of the bronze medal-winning teams at the 2012 and 2016 Olympics, scoring four goals in the London games and two in the Rio games.

Tancredi competed for team Canada in three World Cup final tournaments: 2007, 2011 and 2015; and three Olympics: Beijing 2008, London 2012, and Rio 2016. At these tournaments, she played in 24 matches and scored 8 goals. She and her teammates won bronze medals at both the London and Rio Olympics. Tancredi scored both goals in a 2–1 win against Germany on the third match day of the 2016 Rio Olympics to put Canada at the top of their group.

== Personal life ==
Tancredi is openly lesbian. Tancredi announced her retirement from soccer in January 2017. She is now a Doctor of Chiropractic, practicing out of The Workshop Performance Clinic in Vancouver.

== Career statistics ==
=== Club ===
Club	Season	League			Playoffs (Note: Includes NWSL Playoffs)		Total	
Club	Season	Division	Apps	Goals	Apps	Goals	Apps	Goals
Chicago Red Stars	2014	NWSL	13	3	—		13	3
Chicago Red Stars	2015	NWSL	8	2	1	0	9	2
Career total			21	5	1	0	22	5

=== International ===
Appearances and goals by national team and year
National team	Year	Apps	Goals
Canada	2004	7	0
Canada	2005	6	0
Canada	2006	1	0
Canada	2007	7	2
Canada	2008	18	6
Canada	2009	4	1
Canada	2010	9	2
Canada	2011	15	3
Canada	2012	21	8
Canada	2013	1	0
Canada	2014	3	0
Canada	2015	17	0
Canada	2016	15	5
Canada	2017	1	0
Total		125	27

Scores and results list Canada's goal tally first, score column indicates score after each Tancredi goal.

List of international goals scored by Melissa Tancredi
No.	Date	Venue	Opponent	Score	Result	Competition	Ref.
1	July 14, 2007	Rio de Janeiro, Brazil	Uruguay	6–0	7–0	2007 Pan American Games	
2	September 20, 2007	Chengdu, China	Australia	1–0	2–2	2007 FIFA Women's World Cup	
3	April 2, 2008	Ciudad Juárez, Mexico	Trinidad and Tobago	1–0	6–0	2008 CONCACAF Olympic Qualifying	
4	April 6, 2008	Ciudad Juárez, Mexico	Costa Rica	1–0	1–0	2008 CONCACAF Olympic Qualifying	
5	April 9, 2008	Ciudad Juárez, Mexico	Mexico	1–0	1–0	2008 CONCACAF Olympic Qualifying	
6	April 12, 2008	Ciudad Juárez, Mexico	United States	1–0	1–1 (a.e.t.)	2008 CONCACAF Olympic Qualifying	
7	June 14, 2008	Suwon, South Korea	Argentina	4–0	5–0	2008 Peace Queen Cup	
8	August 12, 2008	Beijing, China	Sweden	1–2	1–2	2008 Summer Olympics	
9	March 10, 2009	Larnaca, Cyprus	Russia	2–0	2–0	2009 Cyprus Women's Cup	
10	September 30, 2010	Toronto, Canada	China	2–1	3–1	Friendly	
11	October 29, 2010	Cancún, Mexico	Trinidad and Tobago	1–0	1–0	2010 CONCACAF World Cup Qualifying	
12	January 21, 2011	Yongchuan, Chongqing, China	China	1–2	3–2	2011 Four Nations Tournament	
13	January 23, 2011	Yongchuan, Chongqing, China	United States	1–1	1–2	2011 Four Nations Tournament	
14	September 17, 2011	Kansas City, Kansas, U.S.	United States	1–1	1–1	Friendly	
15	January 21, 2012	Vancouver, Canada	Cuba	2–0	2–0	2012 CONCACAF Olympic Qualifying	
16	January 27, 2012	Vancouver, Canada	Mexico	2–0	3–1	2012 CONCACAF Olympic Qualifying	
17	February 28, 2012	Larnaca, Cyprus	Scotland	5–1	5–1	2012 Cyprus Women's Cup	
18	June 30, 2012	Sandy, Utah, U.S.	United States	1–1	1–2	Friendly	
19	July 25, 2012	Coventry, England	Japan	1–2	1–2	2012 Summer Olympics	
20	July 28, 2012	Coventry, England	South Africa	1–0	3–0	2012 Summer Olympics	
21	July 31, 2012	Newcastle, England	Sweden	1–2	2–2	2012 Summer Olympics	
22	July 31, 2012	Newcastle, England	Sweden	2–2	2–2	2012 Summer Olympics	
23	February 14, 2016	Houston, Texas, U.S.	Trinidad and Tobago	2–0	6–0	2016 CONCACAF Olympic Qualifying	
24	February 16, 2016	Houston, Texas, U.S.	Guatemala	1–0	10–0	2016 CONCACAF Olympic Qualifying	
25	February 16, 2016	Houston, Texas, U.S.	Guatemala	9–0	10–0	2016 CONCACAF Olympic Qualifying	
26	August 9, 2016	Brasília, Brazil	Germany	1–1	2–1	2016 Summer Olympics	
27	August 9, 2016	Brasília, Brazil	Germany	2–1	2–1	2016 Summer Olympics	

== Honours ==
Canada

- Summer Olympic Games: Bronze Medal, 2016

== See also ==
- List of women's footballers with 100 or more international caps
