= Natalie Garcia (footballer) =

US-born Mexican international footballer (born 1990)

Natalie García
Personal information
- Full name: Natalie Ann García Méndez
- Birth name: Natalie Ann Garcia
- Date of birth: 30 January 1990 (age 36)
- Place of birth: Valley Center, California, United States
- Height: 1.71 m (5 ft 7 in)
- Position: Defender

Youth career
- San Pasqual High School

College career
Years	Team	Apps	(Gls)
2008–2011	San Diego Toreros	83	(7)

International career^{‡}
2010	Mexico U20	4	(0)
2010–2012	Mexico	9	(0)
- ‡ National team caps and goals as of 28 January 2012

Natalie Ann García Méndez (born 30 January 1990) is an American retired Mexican footballer who played as a defender. She has been a member the Mexico women's national team.

== Education ==
García attended the University of San Diego in San Diego, California.

== International career ==
García represented Mexico at the 2010 FIFA U-20 Women's World Cup. She capped at senior level during the 2010 CONCACAF Women's World Cup Qualifying, the 2011 FIFA Women's World Cup and the 2012 CONCACAF Women's Olympic Qualifying Tournament.

== See also ==
- List of Mexico women's international footballers
