= Alma Martínez (footballer) =

Mexican footballer (born 1981)

Personal information
- Full name: Alma Socorro Martínez Torres
- Date of birth: 22 September 1981 (age 45)
- Place of birth: Santa Barbara, California, U.S.
- Height: 1.65 m (5 ft 5 in)
- Position: Forward

Youth career
- –1999: Santa Barbara Dons
- Empire Club

College career
Years	Team	Apps	(Gls)
2000–2001	Santa Barbara City Vaqueros		
2002–2003	UC Santa Barbara Gauchos	41	(8)

International career
2004	Mexico	9	(1)

Managerial career
- 2005–2006: Chico State Wildcats (assistant)

Alma Socorro Martínez Torres (born 22 September 1981) is a former footballer who played as a forward. Born in the United States, Martínez represented the Mexico women's national team, earning nine caps for the team in 2004 and scoring one goal. She competed for Mexico at the 2004 Summer Olympics in Athens, Greece, where the team finished in eighth place.

After graduating from Santa Barbara High School in 1999, Martínez played for the Santa Barbara City Vaqueros in 2000 and 2001. She then joined UC Santa Barbara Gauchos for the 2002 and 2003 seasons, scoring 8 goals and recording 6 assists in 41 appearances for the team.

After her playing career concluded, Martínez served as an assistant coach for the Chico State Wildcats in 2005 and 2006.
