= Evelyn López =

Mexican footballer (born 1978)

Personal information
- Full name: Juana Evelyn López Luna
- Date of birth: 25 December 1978 (age 47)
- Place of birth: Mexico
- Position: Midfielder

Senior career*
Years	Team	Apps	(Gls)
2004	Necaxa		

International career^{‡}
2004–2011	Mexico	102	(14)
- * Club domestic league appearances and goals ‡ National team caps and goals as of 26 June 2011 (before the 2011 FIFA Women's World Cup)

Juana Evelyn López Luna (born 25 December 1978), known as Evelyn López, is a Mexican former football midfielder who played for the Mexico women's national football team at the 2004 Summer Olympics and the 2011 FIFA Women's World Cup. At the club level, she played for Necaxa.

== International goals ==
No.	Date	Venue	Opponent	Score	Result	Competition
1.	27 February 2004	Estadio Eladio Rosabal Cordero, Heredia, Costa Rica	Trinidad and Tobago	1–0	8–1	2004 CONCACAF Women's Pre-Olympic Tournament
2.	13 October 2007	Edward Jones Dome, St. Louis, United States	United States	1–0	1–5	Friendly
3.	2 April 2008	Estadio Olímpico Benito Juárez, Ciudad Juárez, Mexico	Jamaica	1–0	8–1	2008 CONCACAF Women's Olympic Qualifying Tournament
4.	2 April 2008	Estadio Olímpico Benito Juárez, Ciudad Juárez, Mexico	Jamaica	4–0	8–1	2008 CONCACAF Women's Olympic Qualifying Tournament
5.	2 April 2008	Estadio Olímpico Benito Juárez, Ciudad Juárez, Mexico	Jamaica	5–0	8–1	2008 CONCACAF Women's Olympic Qualifying Tournament
6.	2 April 2008	Estadio Olímpico Benito Juárez, Ciudad Juárez, Mexico	Jamaica	6–0	8–1	2008 CONCACAF Women's Olympic Qualifying Tournament

== See also ==
- Mexico at the 2004 Summer Olympics
