= María de Jesús Castillo =

Mexican footballer (born 1983)

Personal information
- Full name: María de Jesús Castillo Nicacio
- Date of birth: 6 July 1983 (age 43)
- Place of birth: Guadalajara, Jalisco, Mexico
- Height: 1.75 m (5 ft 9 in)
- Position: Defender

International career
Years	Team	Apps	(Gls)
- Mexico

María de Jesús Castillo Nicacio (born July 6, 1983) is a Mexican former footballer. She competed for her native country at the 2004 Summer Olympics in Athens, Greece, where she finished in 8th place with the Mexico women's national football team.

== See also ==
- List of Mexico women's international footballers
