= Maribel Domínguez =

Mexican footballer (born 1978)

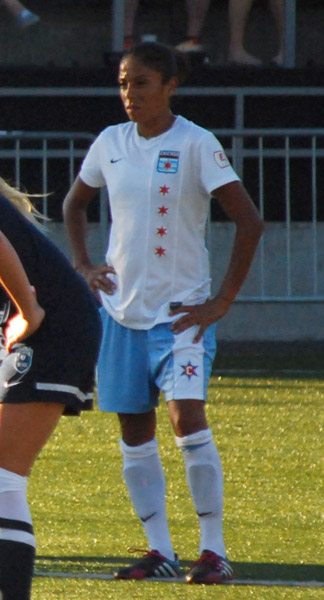
- Domínguez on 25 July 2013 in Tukwila, Washington

Personal information
- Full name: Maribel Domínguez Castelán
- Date of birth: 18 November 1978 (age 47)
- Place of birth: Mexico City, Mexico
- Height: 1.61 m (5 ft 3 in)
- Position: Forward

Senior career*
Years	Team	Apps	(Gls)
2002	Kansas City Mystics		(18)
2003	Atlanta Beat	18	(7)
2005–2006	Barcelona		
2007–2012	UE L'Estartit		
2007	San Diego Sunwaves	3	(3)
2013	Chicago Red Stars	16	(2)
2013	UAEH Panthers		

International career^{‡}
1998–2016	Mexico	116	(82)

Managerial career
- 2017–2018: Mexico U17 (assistant)
- 2018–2019: Mexico U15
- 2019–2020: Mexico U17
- 2020: Mexico (assistant)
- 2021–2022: Mexico U20
Medal record
Representing Mexico
Pan American Games Women's Football
Bronze medal – third place	2011 Guadalajara	Team competition
- * Club domestic league appearances and goals as of 1 August 2014 ‡ National team caps and goals as of 18 February 2016

Maribel Domínguez Castelán (born 18 November 1978) is a Mexican former footballer who was the captain of the Mexico women's national football team. She is known internationally as Marigol for her record of 46 goals scored in 49 matches for the Mexico women's national team.

Domínguez has played professionally in the United States, Spain, and Mexico. In 2003, she was the first Mexico-born player to sign for a team in the Women's United Soccer Association (WUSA), the top division in the United States at the time. As a forward for the Atlanta Beat, she was a leading scorer in the league during its final year of operation. In 2004, she made international headlines when she signed for a men's team in Mexico but was denied by FIFA. From 2005 to 2013, she played professionally for several teams around the world including FC Barcelona, UE L'Estartit, San Diego Sunwaves, Chicago Red Stars, and UAEH Panteras.

Domínguez has played the most games (116) in the history of the women's national team. She has also scored the most goals (82) out of any single Mexico national player, including among those in the men's squad. In 2004, she was ranked in FIFA's top 25 women players in the world. She is the only Mexico player to have appeared in and scored for the Mexico squad in Olympic Games, World Cup, CONCACAF Gold Cup and Pan American Games.

== Early life ==
The youngest of ten children, Domínguez was born in Mexico City, Mexico, and grew up in the rural suburb of Chalco. Despite the perception of sport by her father, she played when young football with her three brothers, though her father did not approve: "My father was very old-fashioned, and he didn't like soccer. He didn't even like that my brothers played soccer. When he went to work, I would sneak out of the house to go and practice in the street." Domínguez did not find a girls' team to play on until she was a teenager. Domínguez fooled the boys in the neighborhood she grew up in into playing with her by keeping her hair short like a boy. They called her Mario and only found out that she was a girl when her picture appeared in the newspaper after she made it on the sub-national women's team.

In 1997, Domínguez joined a women's team called Inter and was forced to have a full body inspection by a female Mexico league official to validate her sex due to her short hair and ability to "play like a man." Domínguez told the inspector, "All right, but only if you do the same." She was not questioned again.

== Playing career ==
=== Club ===
==== Kansas City Mystics, 2002 ====
With the absence of a women's professional league in Mexico, Domínguez immigrated to the United States to play with the Kansas City Mystics in 2002 and further her development as a footballer. During her first and only season with the Mystics, she led the league with 17 goals and 12 assists while helping the team clinch the Midwest Division title. She subsequently earned the Most Valuable Player award from the W-League.

==== Atlanta Beat, 2003 ====
The following year, Domínguez signed with the Atlanta Beat in the Women's United Soccer Association (WUSA), the top division of professional soccer in the United States at the time. She was the first Mexico-born player to sign with the league since its inception in 2001. During her first month with the team, she was named the league's Player of the Month after scoring five goals and two assists in three games. She scored seven goals during the 2003 season and was a leading scorer in the league. Of her experience, she said, "It's very special for me to be in the top scoring position in this league. It's the best thing that has happened to me in my career, right up there with scoring in the 1999 Women's World Cup." The Beat finished second in the standings with a 9–4–8 record.

==== Denied by FIFA and playing professionally in Spain, 2004–12 ====
In December 2004, Domínguez made international headlines when she signed a two-year contract for second division men's team, Atlético Celaya, in Guanajuato, Mexico. Domínguez said of the signing, "The thing is, that in Mexico we don't have even a decent amateur league for women, so you have to look for other options... I knew that the decision could go either way, but were expecting a yes. The hard thing is going to be equaling the physical force of the men, but the technique, the desire, the willpower, those are things that I already have." While the Mexican Football Association did not object, they deferred to FIFA headquarters in Zurich for an official ruling. FIFA ruled against mixed-sex football teams stating, "There must be a clear separation between men's and women's football." Furthermore, a ban was placed on Domínguez for playing in an exhibition game outside the league but still alongside men. "I just wanted to be given the chance to try," Domínguez said. "If I failed I would have been the first to say I can't do it, the first to admit it doesn't work. But at least I would have tried."

Beginning in early 2005, Domínguez played for FC Barcelona in Spain's top division league, Superliga Femenina. The team was struggling to avoid relegation. Her debut for FC Barcelona occurred on 30 January 2005 during a match against Torrejón where she scored a hat-trick and helped the squad win 5–3. Barcelona remained in the Superliga and renewed Domínguez's contract for another year. She was one of the first foreign women's footballers to be given a license to play in Spain.

In January 2007, Domínguez signed with UE L'Estartit in Spain's second division. Despite playing only half the season, she scored 22 goals and helped the club win the championship title and ascend to the first division Superliga for the following season – a first-ever for the team. In the 2007 summer season, Domínguez fulfilled a prior obligation to play for San Diego Sunwaves in the American W-League. She scored on her debut against Vancouver Whitecaps and finished with three goals in three games. During the 2007–08 season, Domínguez scored 15 goals for UE L'Estartit in the Superliga Femenina.

During the 2008–09 Superliga Femenina season Domínguez was still enjoying playing for L'Estartit. She revealed it was her ultimate dream to coach the Mexico women's national team. She had started coaching L'Estartit's youth teams the previous season. Difficulties with her visa and commitments with the Mexico national team eventually reduced Domínguez's playing time with UE L'Estartit. In the first half of the 2011–12 Superliga Femenina season she appeared four times. In April 2012 UE L'Estartit admitted defeat in their attempts to bring her back to Spain.

==== Chicago Red Stars and UAEH Panteras, 2013 ====
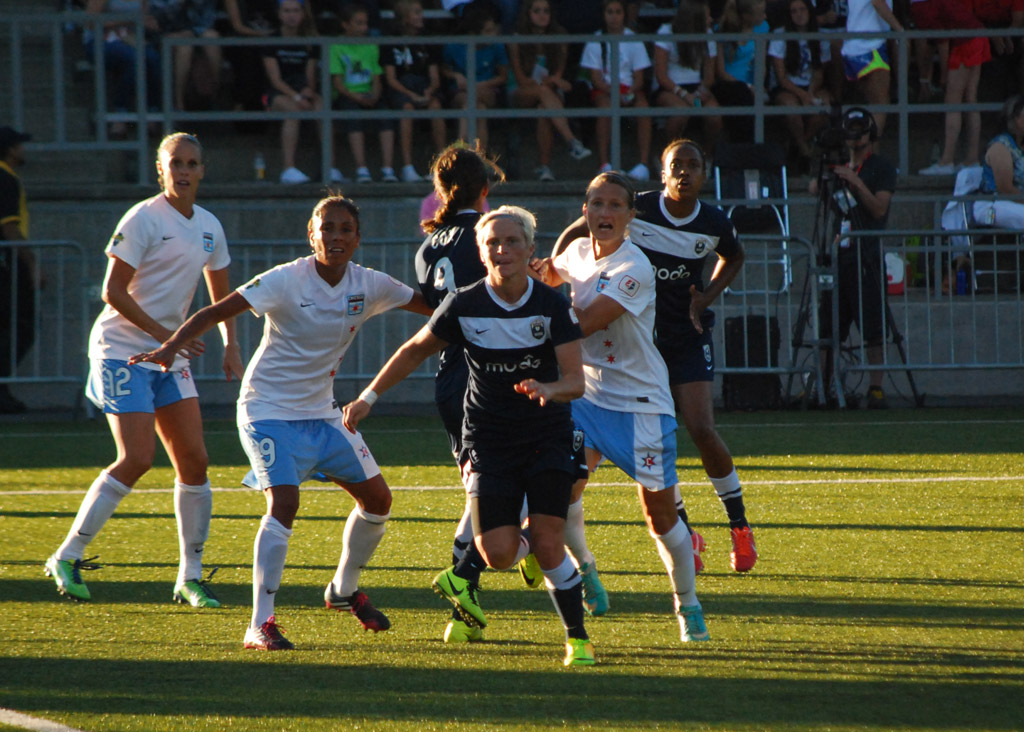
Domínguez (second from left) playing for the Chicago Red Stars in a match against Seattle Reign FC on 25 July 2013 in Tukwila, Washington.

In 2013, Domínguez joined the Chicago Red Stars for the inaugural season of the National Women's Soccer League (NWSL), the top division professional soccer league in the United States. Along with Mexico national teammate, Dinora Garza, she was allocated to the Red Stars as part of the NWSL Player Allocation. Domínguez started in 9 of her 16 appearances for the Red Stars, playing a total of 705 minutes. She scored two goals during the season: one game-opener goal during a 3–3 draw against FC Kansas City on 14 July and another game-opener during a 3–3 draw against Sky Blue FC on 11 August. Chicago finished the 2013 season sixth in the standings with an 8–6–8 record.

After the American season Domínguez returned to Mexico to play for UAEH Panteras, a Super Liga Femenil de Fútbol team affiliated to Universidad Autónoma del Estado de Hidalgo. She scored a debut hat-trick in the Panthers' 6–2 win over Laguna FC in August 2013.

=== International ===
As of 2013, Domínguez has played the most games (109) and scored the most goals (75) in the history of the women's national team. She is the only Mexico player to have appeared and scored for the Mexico team in Olympic Games, World Cup, CONCACAF Gold Cup and Pan American Games.

Domínguez received her first call-up to the Mexico women's national football team in 1998 at the age of 20, and helped the team qualify for the 1999 FIFA Women's World Cup. She scored Mexico's only goal in the tournament during a 7–1 loss to Brazil at Giants Stadium in East Rutherford, New Jersey. In 2002, she was part of the Mexico squad that earned a bronze medal in the CONCACAF Women's Gold Cup. With nine goals, she was the top scorer during the CONCACAF Women's Olympic Qualifying Tournament for the 2004 Athens Olympics, a first in the history of the Mexico national team. During the 2004 Olympics in Athens, Greece, Domínguez led the Mexico national team to the quarter-finals and scored the team's only goal during the tournament. The following year, she was ranked in FIFA's top 25 women players in the world and was nominated for the FIFA Player of the Year award.

External videos
- Domínguez' opening goal in the second minute of Mexico's 2–1 upset victory over the United States during the semifinals of the CONCACAF Women's World Cup Qualifying Tournament on 5 November 2010 retrieved 14 September 2013

On 5 November 2010, Domínguez scored the opening goal in Mexico's 2–1 upset victory over the United States during the semifinals of the CONCACAF Women's World Cup Qualifying Tournament. She ran under a looping pass to sneak behind the United States' defensive line just past two minutes into the game and tapped her shot past the American goalkeeper to give Mexico the early lead.

In 2011, Domínguez captained the Mexico squad to a bronze medal win at the 2011 Pan American Games in Guadalajara, Mexico. During the team's second group stage match against Trinidad and Tobago, she scored Mexico's only goal on a penalty kick in the 42nd second. Her equalizer resulted in a 1–1 draw. After Mexico won their third group stage match 1–0 against Colombia, the team advanced to the semi-finals where they were defeated 1–0 by Brazil.

The same year, Domínguez led CONCACAF's second-place team to play in the 2011 FIFA Women's World Cup in Germany. The squad's opening group stage match resulted in a 1–1 draw against England at Volkswagen-Arena in Wolfsburg in front of 18,702 spectators. During its second group stage match on 1 July, Mexico was defeated 4–0 by the eventual gold medal-winning team, Japan. During its third and final group stage match against New Zealand, Domínguez scored Mexico's second goal in the 29th minute lifting the score to 2–0 after her teammate Stephany Mayor scored in the second minute of the game. New Zealand scored in the 90th and during stoppage time to level the final score to 2–2. Mexico did not advance to the quarter-finals.

In 2012, Domínguez scored 3 goals during the qualifying round of the 2012 CONCACAF Women's Olympic Qualifying Tournament held in Vancouver, British Columbia, Canada; however, the team was eliminated en route to the 2012 London Olympics.

==== Appearances and goals at international tournaments ====
===== FIFA World Cup =====
Tournament	Location	Result	Matches	Goals
1999 FIFA Women's World Cup	USA	Group stage	3	1
2011 FIFA Women's World Cup	Germany	Group stage	3	1

===== Olympic Games =====
Tournament	Location	Result	Matches	Goals
2004 Summer Olympics	Greece	Quarterfinal	3	1

===== CONCACAF Gold Cup =====
Tournament	Location	Result	Matches	Goals
2000 CONCACAF Gold Cup	USA	Group stage	3	5
2002 CONCACAF Gold Cup	USA	Bronze medal	5	3
2006 CONCACAF Gold Cup	USA	Bronze medal	3	2

===== Pan American Games =====
Tournament	Location	Result	Matches	Goals
2011 Pan American Games	Mexico	Bronze medal	3	1

== International goals ==
No.	Date	Venue	Opponent	Score	Result	Competition
1.	20 September 1998	Richmond, United States	Russia	1–?	1–5	1998 Women's U.S. Cup
2.	14 December 1998	Toluca, Mexico	Argentina	2–1	3–1	1999 FIFA Women's World Cup qualification
3.	19 December 1998	Buenos Aires, Argentina	Argentina	1–0	3–2	1999 FIFA Women's World Cup qualification
4.	19 June 1999	East Rutherford, United States	Brazil	1–1	1–7	1999 FIFA Women's World Cup
5.	7 May 2000	Portland, United States	South Korea	2–0	4–1	2000 Women's U.S. Cup
6.	7 May 2000	Portland, United States	South Korea	3–1	4–1	2000 Women's U.S. Cup
7.	24 June 2000	Foxborough, United States	Canada	1–0	3–4	2000 CONCACAF Women's Gold Cup
8.	24 June 2000	Foxborough, United States	Canada	2–2	3–4	2000 CONCACAF Women's Gold Cup
9.	26 June 2000	Hershey, United States	Guatemala	1–0	7–0	2000 CONCACAF Women's Gold Cup
10.	26 June 2000	Hershey, United States	Guatemala	4–0	7–0	2000 CONCACAF Women's Gold Cup
11.	26 June 2000	Hershey, United States	Guatemala	6–0	7–0	2000 CONCACAF Women's Gold Cup
12.	10 December 2000	Houston, United States	United States	1–1	2–3	Friendly
13.	29 October 2002	Fullerton, United States	Panama	5–1	5–1	2002 CONCACAF Women's Gold Cup
14.	9 November 2002	Pasadena, United States	Costa Rica	3–1	4–1	2002 CONCACAF Women's Gold Cup
15.	9 November 2002	Pasadena, United States	Costa Rica	4–1	4–1	2002 CONCACAF Women's Gold Cup
16.	1 February 2003	Canberra, Australia	South Korea	2–0	2–0	2003 Australia Cup
17.	12 December 2003	Tegucigalpa, Honduras	Nicaragua	1–0	8–0	2004 CONCACAF Women's Pre-Olympic Tournament qualification
18.	12 December 2003	Tegucigalpa, Honduras	Nicaragua	3–0	8–0	2004 CONCACAF Women's Pre-Olympic Tournament qualification
19.	12 December 2003	Tegucigalpa, Honduras	Nicaragua	5–0	8–0	2004 CONCACAF Women's Pre-Olympic Tournament qualification
20.	12 December 2003	Tegucigalpa, Honduras	Nicaragua	6–0	8–0	2004 CONCACAF Women's Pre-Olympic Tournament qualification
21.	14 December 2003	Tegucigalpa, Honduras	Honduras	1–0	6–0	2004 CONCACAF Women's Pre-Olympic Tournament qualification
22.	14 December 2003	Tegucigalpa, Honduras	Honduras	3–0	6–0	2004 CONCACAF Women's Pre-Olympic Tournament qualification
23.	25 February 2004	San José, Costa Rica	Haiti	4–0	5–0	2004 CONCACAF Women's Pre-Olympic Tournament
24.	25 February 2004	San José, Costa Rica	Haiti	5–0	5–0	2004 CONCACAF Women's Pre-Olympic Tournament
25.	27 February 2004	Heredia, Costa Rica	Trinidad and Tobago	4–0	8–1	2004 CONCACAF Women's Pre-Olympic Tournament
26.	27 February 2004	Heredia, Costa Rica	Trinidad and Tobago	6–1	8–1	2004 CONCACAF Women's Pre-Olympic Tournament
27.	27 February 2004	Heredia, Costa Rica	Trinidad and Tobago	7–1	8–1	2004 CONCACAF Women's Pre-Olympic Tournament
28.	3 March 2004	San José, Costa Rica	Canada	1–0	2–1	2004 CONCACAF Women's Pre-Olympic Tournament
29.	3 March 2004	San José, Costa Rica	Canada	2–0	2–1	2004 CONCACAF Women's Pre-Olympic Tournament
30.	5 March 2004	Heredia, Costa Rica	United States	1–0	2–3	2004 CONCACAF Women's Pre-Olympic Tournament
31.	5 March 2004	Heredia, Costa Rica	United States	2–0	2–3	2004 CONCACAF Women's Pre-Olympic Tournament
32.	7 July 2004	Mexico City, Mexico	Australia	1–2	1–2	Friendly
33.	10 July 2004	Guadalajara, Mexico	Australia	1–0	2–0	Friendly
34.	10 July 2004	Guadalajara, Mexico	Australia	2–0	2–0	Friendly
35.	14 August 2004	Patras, Greece	China	1–0	1–1	2004 Summer Olympics
36.	19 November 2006	Miami, United States	Trinidad and Tobago	3–0	3–0	2006 CONCACAF Women's Gold Cup
37.	26 November 2006	Carson, United States	Jamaica	2–0	3–0	2006 CONCACAF Women's Gold Cup
38.	17 March 2007	Toluca, Mexico	Japan	2–1	2–1	2007 FIFA Women's World Cup qualification
39.	17 October 2010	Suwon, South Korea	Australia	1–3	1–3	2010 Peace Queen Cup
40.	29 October 2010	Cancún, Mexico	Guyana	2–0	7–2	2010 CONCACAF Women's World Cup Qualifying
41.	29 October 2010	Cancún, Mexico	Guyana	3–1	7–2	2010 CONCACAF Women's World Cup Qualifying
42.	29 October 2010	Cancún, Mexico	Guyana	6–2	7–2	2010 CONCACAF Women's World Cup Qualifying
43.	29 October 2010	Cancún, Mexico	Guyana	7–2	7–2	2010 CONCACAF Women's World Cup Qualifying
44.	31 October 2010	Cancún, Mexico	Trinidad and Tobago	1–0	2–0	2010 CONCACAF Women's World Cup Qualifying
45.	5 November 2010	Cancún, Mexico	United States	1–0	2–1	2010 CONCACAF Women's World Cup Qualifying
46.	7 March 2011	Sotira, Cyprus	Northern Ireland	1–0	3–1	2011 Cyprus Women's Cup
47.	22 April 2011	Chía, Colombia	Colombia	3–1	3–2	Friendly
48.	24 April 2011	Chía, Colombia	Colombia	1–1	4–2	Friendly
49.	24 April 2011	Chía, Colombia	Colombia	4–2	4–2	Friendly
50.	5 July 2011	Sinsheim, Germany	New Zealand	2–0	2–2	2011 FIFA Women's World Cup
51.	20 October 2011	Guadalajara, Mexico	Trinidad and Tobago	1–1	1–1	2011 Pan American Games
52.	22 January 2012	Vancouver, Canada	Guatemala	2–0	5–0	2012 CONCACAF Women's Olympic Qualifying Tournament
53.	22 January 2012	Vancouver, Canada	Guatemala	4–0	5–0	2012 CONCACAF Women's Olympic Qualifying Tournament
54.	22 January 2012	Vancouver, Canada	Guatemala	5–0	5–0	2012 CONCACAF Women's Olympic Qualifying Tournament
55.	13 December 2012	São Paulo, Brazil	Brazil	2–1	2–1	2012 International Women's Football Tournament
56.	19 November 2014	Veracruz, Mexico	Trinidad and Tobago	2–0	6–0	2014 Central American and Caribbean Games
57.	27 November 2014	Veracruz, Mexico	Colombia	2–0	2–0	2014 Central American and Caribbean Games
58.	26 January 2016	Foshan, China	Vietnam	1–0	1–0	2016 Four Nations Tournament
59.	10 February 2016	Frisco, United States	Puerto Rico	1–0	6–0	2016 CONCACAF Women's Olympic Qualifying Championship
60.	10 February 2016	Frisco, United States	Puerto Rico	3–0	6–0	2016 CONCACAF Women's Olympic Qualifying Championship
61.	10 February 2016	Frisco, United States	Puerto Rico	5–0	6–0	2016 CONCACAF Women's Olympic Qualifying Championship
62.	15 February 2016	Frisco, United States	Costa Rica	1–2	1–2	2016 CONCACAF Women's Olympic Qualifying Championship

== Managerial career ==
=== Mexico U-15 girls' national football team ===
On 8 August 2018. Mexico U-15 girls' national football team finished as runners up at the 2018 CONCACAF Girls' Under-15 Championship

=== Mexico U-20 Women’s national football team ===
Domínguez was named manager of the Mexico women's national under-20 football team on 19 January 2021. She led the team to qualify for the upcoming 2022 FIFA U-20 Women's World Cup as well as reaching the final of the 2022 CONCACAF Women's U-20 Championship.

On 21 July 2022, Dominguez and her coaching staff were suspended and separated from the team by the FMF due to a matter that required an internal investigation to be open.

== Honors and awards ==
=== Player ===
- 2002 W-League Most Valuable Player
- 2002 W-League Team of the Week (3 times)
- 2003 WUSA Player of the Month
- 2005 FIFA Player of the Year nominee

=== Manager ===
Mexico U-15 girl's national football team

- CONCACAF Girls' Under-15 Championship: Runners Up: 2018

== See also ==
- List of footballers with 100 or more caps
- List of Mexico women's international footballers
- List of 2011 Pan American Games medal winners
- List of foreign NWSL players
- List of FC Barcelona Femení players
