= Raiza Gutiérrez =

Panamanian football manager (born 1983)

Raiza Gutiérrez (born 26 June 1983) is a Panamanian football manager and former player.

== Early life ==
Gutiérrez started playing football at a young age in the streets of Panama.

== Playing career ==
Gutiérrez was described as "a brand-name player, with a strong character on the field, immovable from the starting position, who became internationally known with the U-19 team". She was also described as "one of the leaders in national women's football, winning ANAFUFE titles".

== Managerial career ==
Gutiérrez was described as "crowned champion directing CD Universitario in the Apertura 2018 and Clausura 2019 tournaments".

== Personal life ==
Gutiérrez has a brother.
