= Luz Saucedo =

Mexican footballer (born 1983)

Personal information
- Full name: Luz del Rosario Saucedo Soto
- Date of birth: 14 December 1983 (age 42)
- Place of birth: Canatlán, Mexico
- Height: 5 ft 1 in (1.55 m)
- Position: Defender

Senior career*
Years	Team	Apps	(Gls)
2013	Portland Thorns FC	0	(0)

International career
2003–2011	Mexico	106	(2)
- * Club domestic league appearances and goals

Luz del Rosario Saucedo Soto (born December 14, 1983) is a Mexican former football defender who played for the Mexico women's national football team.

== Early life ==
Luz Saucedo was born in Canatlán, Mexico.

== Playing career ==
=== Club ===
==== Portland Thorns FC ====
In January 2013, Saucedo was included in a list of 55 players from the U.S., Canada, and Mexico national teams that were allocated to the eight teams in the new National Women's Soccer League. She was allocated to Portland Thorns FC but was later removed by the Mexican Football Federation for unknown reasons.

=== International ===
Saucedo represented Mexico at the FIFA U-19 Women's World Cup in Canada 2002), at the 2004 Summer Olympic Games in Athens, and at two Pan American Games in the Dominican Republic in 2003 and Rio de Janeiro in 2007. She also was a member of the Mexico women's national football team at the 2011 FIFA Women's World Cup in Germany.

== Personal ==
Saucedo's nickname is "Charito."
