= Patricia Pérez (footballer) =

Mexican footballer (born 1978)

Personal information
- Birth name: Patricia Pérez Peña
- Date of birth: 17 December 1978 (age 47)
- Place of birth: Guadalajara, Jalisco, Mexico

International career
Years	Team	Apps	(Gls)
- Mexico

Patricia Pérez Peña (born 17 December 1978 in Guadalajara, Jalisco) is a Mexican former footballer who played for the Mexico women's national football team. She competed for her native country at the 2004 Summer Olympics in Athens, Greece, where the team finished in eighth place.
