= Maylee Atthin-Johnson =

Trinidadian footballer

Personal information
- Date of birth: 5 September 1986 (age 40)
- Place of birth: Port of Spain, Trinidad and Tobago
- Height: 1.63 m (5 ft 4 in)
- Position: Midfielder

College career
Years	Team	Apps	(Gls)
2005	Cumberland Bulldogs	1+	(1+)
2006–2009	Kennesaw State Owls	29+	(8+)

International career^{‡}
2001–2004	Trinidad and Tobago U-19	8+	(17)
2005–2006	Trinidad and Tobago U-20	2+	(5)
2002–	Trinidad and Tobago	48+	(17)
- ‡ National team caps and goals as of 16:24, 28 February 2026 (UTC+1)

Maylee Atthin-Johnson (born 5 September 1986) is a Trinidadian footballer who played as a forward for the Trinidad and Tobago women's national team and has served as its captain.

== International goals ==
Scores and results list Trinidad and Tobago' goal tally first.

No.	Date	Venue	Opponent	Score	Result	Competition
1	5 July 2002	Trinidad and Tobago	Dominica	?–?	13–0	2002 CONCACAF Women's Gold Cup qualification
2	5 July 2002	Trinidad and Tobago	Dominica	?–?	13–0	2002 CONCACAF Women's Gold Cup qualification
3	5 July 2002	Trinidad and Tobago	Dominica	?–?	13–0	2002 CONCACAF Women's Gold Cup qualification
4	6 July 2002	Trinidad and Tobago	Dominica	?–?	9–0	2002 CONCACAF Women's Gold Cup qualification
5	13 August 2002	Paramaribo, Suriname	Suriname	?–?	3–1	2002 CONCACAF Women's Gold Cup qualification
6	13 August 2002	Paramaribo, Suriname	Suriname	?–?	3–1	2002 CONCACAF Women's Gold Cup qualification
7	15 August 2002	Paramaribo, Suriname	Suriname	?–?	2–1	2002 CONCACAF Women's Gold Cup qualification
8	27 October 2002	Pasadena, United States	Panama	1–2	2–4	2002 CONCACAF Women's Gold Cup
9	12 November 2003	André Kamperveen Stadion, Paramaribo, Suriname	Suriname	1–0	4–2	2004 CONCACAF Women's Olympic Qualifying Tournament qualification
10	12 November 2003	André Kamperveen Stadion, Paramaribo, Suriname	Suriname	4–2	4–2	2004 CONCACAF Women's Olympic Qualifying Tournament qualification
11	29 February 2004	Estadio Nacional, San José, Costa Rica	Haiti	2–0	6–2	2004 CONCACAF Women's Pre-Olympic Tournament
12	4 April 2008	Estadio Olímpico Benito Juárez, Ciudad Juárez, Mexico	Costa Rica	2–1	2–2	2008 CONCACAF Women's Pre-Olympic Tournament
13	30 July 2010	Estadio Metropolitano, Mérida, Venezuela	Guatemala	3–2	3–2	2010 Central American and Caribbean Games
14	20 October 2011	Estadio Omnilife, Guadalajara, Mexico	Mexico	1–0	1–1	2011 Pan American Games
15	20 August 2014	Hasely Crawford Stadium, Port of Spain, Trinidad and Tobago	Saint Kitts and Nevis	5–0	10–0	2014 CONCACAF Women's Championship
16	20 October 2014	RFK Stadium, Washington, United States	Guatemala	2–0	2–1	2014 CONCACAF Women's Championship
17	11 July 2015	Hamilton Pan Am Soccer Stadium, Hamilton, Canada	Argentina	2–2	2–2	2015 Pan American Games
