= 2003 FIFA Women's World Cup knockout stage =

Football tournament knockout stage

The knockout stage was the second and final stage of the 2003 FIFA Women's World Cup in the United States. It began with the quarter-finals on October 1, and ended with the final at the Home Depot Center in Carson, California on October 12, 2003. It featured Germany, China, Norway, Brazil, Canada, Russia, Sweden, and defending champions and hosts the United States.

Canada, Germany, Sweden and the United States reached the semi-finals. Sweden then beat Canada 2–1 to reach the final, while Germany overcame the host country 3–0. The United States beat its neighbors 3–1 for third place, and Germany defeated Sweden 2–1 in the final in extra time.

This was the last World Cup to use the golden goal rule; it would be abolished in 2005 as the extra time play was restored.

All times listed below are in American time (EDT/UTC−4, PDT/UTC–7).

== Qualified teams ==
Group	Winners	Runners-up
A	United States	Sweden
B	Brazil	Norway
C	Germany	Canada
D	China	Russia

== Bracket ==
Quarter-finals
October 1 – Foxborough
United States	1
Norway	0
October 2 – Portland
Germany	7
Russia	1
October 1 – Foxborough
Brazil	1
Sweden	2
October 2 – Portland
China	0
Canada	1

Semi-finals
October 5 – Portland
United States	0
Germany	3
October 5 – Portland
Sweden	2
Canada	1

Final
October 12 – Carson
Germany (g.g.)	2
Sweden	1
Third place play-off
October 11 – Carson
United States	3
Canada	1

== Quarter-finals ==
=== Brazil vs Sweden ===
October 1, 2003
16:30 EDT (UTC−4)

Brazil	1–2	Sweden
Marta 44' (pen.)	Report	Svensson 23'; Andersson 53'

Gillette Stadium, Foxborough
Attendance: 25,103
Referee: Zhang Dongqing (China PR)

GK	1	Andréia
DF	3	Juliana (c)	(yellow card) 52'
DF	4	Tânia
MF	5	Renata Costa
MF	18	Daniela	(yellow card) 37'
MF	16	Maycon
MF	17	Kátia
FW	14	Rosana
FW	2	Simone		(substituted off) 58'
FW	7	Formiga		(substituted off) 81'
FW	10	Marta
Substitutions:
FW	11	Cristiane		(substituted on) 58'
FW	9	Kelly		(substituted on) 81'
Manager:
Paulo Gonçalves

GK	12	Sofia Lundgren	(yellow card) 43'
DF	4	Hanna Marklund
DF	2	Karolina Westberg
DF	3	Jane Törnqvist
DF	7	Sara Larsson		(substituted off) 90'
DF	18	Frida Östberg
MF	9	Malin Andersson		(substituted off) 72'
MF	6	Malin Moström (c)
MF	17	Anna Sjöström	(yellow card) 15'
FW	10	Hanna Ljungberg
FW	11	Victoria Svensson
Substitutes:
MF	15	Therese Sjögran		(substituted on) 72'
DF	19	Sara Call		(substituted on) 90'
Manager:
Marika Domanski-Lyfors

Player of the Match:
Malin Moström (Sweden)

Assistant referees:
Liu Hsiu-mei (Chinese Taipei)
Hisae Yoshizawa (Japan)
Fourth official:
Tammy Ogston (Australia)

=== United States vs Norway ===
October 1, 2003
19:30 EDT (UTC−4)

United States	1–0	Norway
Wambach 24'	Report

Gillette Stadium, Foxborough
Attendance: 25,103
Referee: Nicole Petignat (Switzerland)

GK	1	Briana Scurry
DF	3	Christie Rampone
DF	14	Joy Fawcett
DF	4	Cat Whitehill
DF	15	Kate Markgraf
MF	13	Kristine Lilly
MF	7	Shannon Boxx
MF	11	Julie Foudy (c)	(substituted off) 81'
FW	12	Cindy Parlow	(substituted off) 72'
FW	9	Mia Hamm
FW	20	Abby Wambach
Substitutions:
FW	16	Tiffeny Milbrett	(substituted on) 72'
DF	2	Kylie Bivens	(substituted on) 81'
Manager:
April Heinrichs

GK	1	Bente Nordby	(yellow card) 66'
DF	2	Brit Sandaune
DF	3	Ane Stangeland Horpestad
DF	4	Monica Knudsen
DF	7	Trine Rønning		(substituted off) 24'
DF	14	Dagny Mellgren (c)
DF	15	Marit Fiane Christensen		(substituted off) 77'
MF	10	Unni Lehn	(yellow card) 80'	(substituted off) 84'
MF	8	Solveig Gulbrandsen
MF	20	Lise Klaveness	(yellow card) 75'
FW	11	Marianne Pettersen
Substitutions:
FW	9	Anita Rapp		(substituted on) 24'
FW	17	Linda Ørmen		(substituted on) 77'
MF	6	Hege Riise	(yellow card) 86'	(substituted on) 84'
Manager:
Åge Steen

Player of the Match:
Bente Nordby (Norway)

Assistant referees:
Elke Lüthi (Switzerland)
Nelly Viennot (France)
Fourth official:
Tammy Ogston (Australia)

=== Germany vs Russia ===
October 2, 2003
16:30 PDT (UTC−7)

Germany	7–1	Russia
Müller 25'; Minnert 57'; Wunderlich 60'; Garefrekes 62', 85'; Prinz 80', 89'	Report	Danilova 70'

PGE Park, Portland
Attendance: 20,012
Referee: Im Eun-ju (South Korea)

GK	1	Silke Rottenberg
DF	2	Kerstin Stegemann
DF	13	Sandra Minnert
DF	19	Stefanie Gottschlich
DF	17	Ariane Hingst
MF	10	Bettina Wiegmann (c)		(substituted off) 66'
MF	18	Kerstin Garefrekes
MF	6	Renate Lingor		(substituted off) 82'
FW	14	Maren Meinert
FW	11	Martina Müller		(substituted off) 57'
FW	9	Birgit Prinz
Substitutions:
MF	7	Pia Wunderlich	(yellow card) 66'	(substituted on) 57'
DF	4	Nia Künzer		(substituted on) 66'
MF	16	Viola Odebrecht		(substituted on) 82'
Manager:
Tina Theune-Meyer

GK	12	Alla Volkova
DF	2	Tatiana Zaytseva
DF	3	Marina Burakova (c)
DF	4	Marina Saenko
DF	5	Vera Stroukova
MF	6	Galina Komarova
MF	7	Tatiana Egorova	(substituted off) 75'
MF	15	Tatyana Skotnikova
MF	8	Alexandra Svetlitskaya	(substituted off) 34'
FW	10	Natalia Barbashina
FW	11	Olga Letyushova	(substituted off) 46'
Substitutions:
MF	19	Elena Denchtchik	(substituted on) 34'
FW	17	Elena Danilova	(substituted on) 46'
DF	16	Marina Kolomiets	(substituted on) 75'
Manager:
Yuri Bystritsky

Player of the Match:
Birgit Prinz (Germany)

Assistant referees:
Choi Soo-jin (South Korea)
Irina Mirt (Romania)
Fourth official:
Katriina Elovirta (Finland)

=== China PR vs Canada ===
October 2, 2003
19:30 PDT (UTC−7)

China	0–1	Canada
	Report	Hooper 7'

PGE Park, Portland
Attendance: 20,012
Referee: Kari Seitz (United States)

GK	1	Han Wenxia
DF	3	Li Jie
DF	5	Fan Yunjie
DF	11	Pu Wei
DF	20	Wang Liping
DF	16	Liu Yali		(substituted off) 82'
MF	6	Zhao Lihong		(substituted off) 58'
MF	10	Liu Ying		(substituted off) 65'
MF	14	Bi Yan
FW	7	Bai Jie
FW	9	Sun Wen (c)
Substitutions:
MF	15	Ren Liping		(substituted on) 58'
MF	8	Zhang Ouying		(substituted on) 65'
FW	13	Teng Wei	(yellow card) 90+2'	(substituted on) 82'
Manager:
Ma Liangxing

GK	20	Taryn Swiatek
DF	6	Sharolta Nonen
DF	18	Tanya Dennis
DF	7	Isabelle Morneau		(substituted off) 12'
MF	5	Andrea Neil	(yellow card) 53'
MF	16	Brittany Timko
MF	13	Diana Matheson
MF	15	Kara Lang	(yellow card) 42'	(substituted off) 90'
FW	2	Christine Latham		(substituted off) 73'
FW	10	Charmaine Hooper (c)	(yellow card) 76'
FW	12	Christine Sinclair
Substitutions:
FW	17	Silvana Burtini		(substituted on) 12'
MF	9	Rhian Wilkinson		(substituted on) 73'
MF	8	Kristina Kiss		(substituted on) 90'
Manager:
(Norway) Even Pellerud

Player of the Match:
Charmaine Hooper (Canada)

Assistant referees:
Karalee Sutton (United States)
Sharon Wheeler (United States)
Fourth official:
Katriina Elovirta (Finland)

== Semi-finals ==
=== United States vs Germany ===
October 5, 2003
16:30 PDT (UTC−7)

United States	0–3	Germany
	Report	Garefrekes 15'; Meinert 90+1'; Prinz 90+3'

PGE Park, Portland
Attendance: 27,623
Referee: Sonia Denoncourt (Canada)

GK	1	Briana Scurry
DF	2	Kylie Bivens	(substituted off) 70'
DF	14	Joy Fawcett
DF	4	Cat Whitehill
DF	15	Kate Markgraf
MF	13	Kristine Lilly
MF	7	Shannon Boxx
MF	11	Julie Foudy (c)
FW	12	Cindy Parlow	(substituted off) 52'
FW	9	Mia Hamm
FW	20	Abby Wambach
Substitutions:
MF	10	Aly Wagner	(substituted on) 52'
FW	16	Tiffeny Milbrett	(substituted on) 70'
Manager:
April Heinrichs

GK	1	Silke Rottenberg
DF	2	Kerstin Stegemann
DF	13	Sandra Minnert
DF	19	Stefanie Gottschlich
DF	17	Ariane Hingst
MF	10	Bettina Wiegmann (c)
MF	18	Kerstin Garefrekes
MF	6	Renate Lingor
MF	7	Pia Wunderlich
FW	14	Maren Meinert
FW	9	Birgit Prinz
Manager:
Tina Theune-Meyer

Player of the Match:
Silke Rottenberg (Germany)

Assistant referees:
Denise Robinson (Canada)
Lynda Bramble (Trinidad and Tobago)
Fourth official:
Cristina Ionescu (Romania)

=== Sweden vs Canada ===
October 5, 2003
19:30 PDT (UTC−7)

Sweden	2–1	Canada
Moström 79'; Öqvist 86'	Report	Lang 64'

PGE Park, Portland
Attendance: 27,623
Referee: Katriina Elovirta (Finland)

GK	1	Caroline Jönsson
DF	4	Hanna Marklund
DF	2	Karolina Westberg
DF	3	Jane Törnqvist	(yellow card) 64'
DF	5	Kristin Bengtsson		(substituted off) 75'
DF	18	Frida Östberg
MF	9	Malin Andersson (c)		(substituted off) 70'
MF	6	Malin Moström
MF	17	Anna Sjöström		(substituted off) 70'
FW	10	Hanna Ljungberg
FW	11	Victoria Svensson
Substitutes:
FW	20	Josefine Öqvist		(substituted on) 70'
MF	15	Therese Sjögran		(substituted on) 70'
MF	13	Sara Johansson		(substituted on) 75'
Manager:
Marika Domanski-Lyfors

GK	20	Taryn Swiatek
DF	6	Sharolta Nonen
DF	18	Tanya Dennis
MF	5	Andrea Neil
MF	16	Brittany Timko
MF	13	Diana Matheson
MF	15	Kara Lang
FW	2	Christine Latham	(substituted off) 74'
FW	17	Silvana Burtini	(substituted off) 55'
FW	10	Charmaine Hooper (c)
FW	12	Christine Sinclair
Substitutions:
MF	8	Kristina Kiss	(substituted on) 55'
MF	9	Rhian Wilkinson	(substituted on) 74'
Manager:
(Norway) Even Pellerud

Player of the Match:
Victoria Svensson (Sweden)

Assistant referees:
Emilia Parviainen (Finland)
Andi Regan (Northern Ireland)
Fourth official:
Tammy Ogston (Australia)

== Third place play-off ==
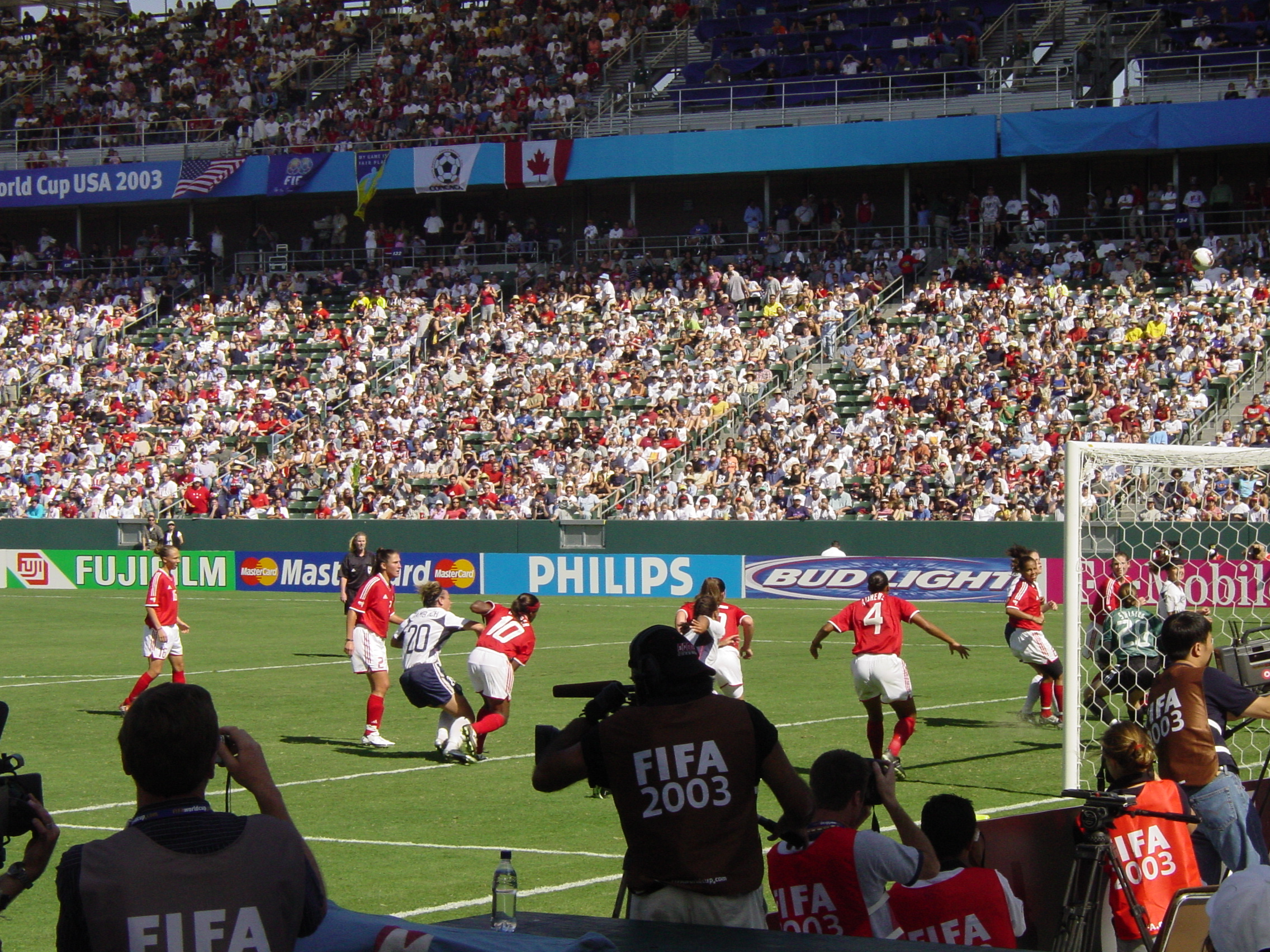
The third place game.

October 11, 2003
12:30 PDT (UTC−7)

United States	3–1	Canada
Lilly 22'; Boxx 51'; Milbrett 80'	Report	Sinclair 38'

Home Depot Center, Carson
Attendance: 25,253
Referee: Tammy Ogston (Australia)

GK	1	Briana Scurry
DF	3	Christie Rampone
DF	14	Joy Fawcett
DF	4	Cat Whitehill
DF	15	Kate Markgraf	(substituted off) 84'
MF	13	Kristine Lilly
MF	7	Shannon Boxx
MF	11	Julie Foudy (c)	(substituted off) 78'
FW	12	Cindy Parlow	(substituted off) 43'
FW	9	Mia Hamm
FW	20	Abby Wambach
Substitutions:
FW	16	Tiffeny Milbrett	(substituted on) 43'
DF	2	Kylie Bivens	(substituted on) 78'
FW	8	Shannon MacMillan	(substituted on) 84'
Manager:
April Heinrichs

GK	20	Taryn Swiatek
DF	6	Sharolta Nonen
DF	4	Sasha Andrews		(substituted off) 84'
MF	5	Andrea Neil		(substituted off) 90'
MF	8	Kristina Kiss
MF	16	Brittany Timko
MF	13	Diana Matheson
MF	15	Kara Lang	(yellow card) 65'	(substituted off) 89'
FW	2	Christine Latham
FW	10	Charmaine Hooper (c)	(yellow card) 76'
FW	12	Christine Sinclair
Substitutions:
DF	7	Isabelle Morneau		(substituted on) 84'
MF	9	Rhian Wilkinson		(substituted on) 89'
MF	14	Carmelina Moscato		(substituted on) 90'
Manager:
(Norway) Even Pellerud

Player of the Match:
Shannon Boxx (United States)

Assistant referees:
Airlie Keen (Australia)
Jacqueline Leleu (Australia)
Fourth official:
Katriina Elovirta (Finland)

== Final ==
October 12, 2003
10:00 am PDT (UTC−7)

Germany	2–1 (a.e.t./g.g.)	Sweden
Meinert 46'; Künzer 98'	Report	Ljungberg 41'

Home Depot Center, Carson
Attendance: 26,137
Referee: Cristina Ionescu (Romania)

GK	1	Silke Rottenberg
DF	2	Kerstin Stegemann
DF	13	Sandra Minnert
DF	19	Stefanie Gottschlich
DF	17	Ariane Hingst
MF	10	Bettina Wiegmann (c)
MF	18	Kerstin Garefrekes	(substituted off) 76'
MF	6	Renate Lingor
MF	7	Pia Wunderlich	(substituted off) 88'
FW	14	Maren Meinert
FW	9	Birgit Prinz
Substitutions:
FW	11	Martina Müller	(substituted on) 76'
DF	4	Nia Künzer	(substituted on) 88'
Manager:
Tina Theune-Meyer

GK	1	Caroline Jönsson
DF	4	Hanna Marklund
DF	2	Karolina Westberg
DF	3	Jane Törnqvist
DF	7	Sara Larsson	(substituted off) 53'
DF	18	Frida Östberg
MF	9	Malin Andersson	(substituted off) 70'
MF	6	Malin Moström (c)
MF	17	Anna Sjöström	(substituted off) 53'
FW	10	Hanna Ljungberg
FW	11	Victoria Svensson
Substitutes:
MF	15	Therese Sjögran	(substituted on) 53'
MF	14	Linda Fagerström	(substituted on) 53'
DF	5	Kristin Bengtsson	(substituted on) 70'
Manager:
Marika Domanski-Lyfors

Player of the Match:
Bettina Wiegmann (Germany)

Assistant referees:
Irina Mirt (Romania)
Katarzyna Nadolska (Poland)
Fourth official:
Sonia Denoncourt (Canada)
