= 2003 FIFA Women's World Cup Group D =

Football tournament group stage

Group D of the 2003 FIFA Women's World Cup was one of four groups of nations, consisting of Australia, China PR, Ghana and Russia. It began on September 21 and ended on September 28. Most matches were played at The Home Depot Center in Carson, save the last two that were played at PGE Park in Portland. China PR topped the group despite their lackluster performances, followed to the next round by Russia. Australia and Ghana didn't make the second round.

Three of these teams had also been also drawn together in Group D of the previous World Cup in 1999 (the exception was Russia, whose place was taken by fellow Europeans Sweden).

== Standings ==
| Pos | Team | Pld | W | D | L | GF | GA | GD | Pts | Qualification |
|---|---|---|---|---|---|---|---|---|---|---|
| 1 | China | 3 | 2 | 1 | 0 | 3 | 1 | +2 | 7 | Advance to knockout stage |
| 2 | Russia | 3 | 2 | 0 | 1 | 5 | 2 | +3 | 6 | Advance to knockout stage |
| 3 | Ghana | 3 | 1 | 0 | 2 | 2 | 5 | −3 | 3 | |
| 4 | Australia | 3 | 0 | 1 | 2 | 3 | 5 | −2 | 1 | |

Source: FIFA
Rules for classification: Group stage tiebreakers

== Matches ==
All times local (PDT/UTC–7)

=== Australia vs Russia ===
September 21, 2003
17:30

| Australia | 1–2 | Russia |
|---|---|---|
| Golebiowski 38' | Report | Alagich 39' (o.g.); Fomina 89' |

Home Depot Center, Carson
Attendance: 15,239
Referee: Bola Elizabeth Abidoye (Nigeria)

| GK | 1 | Cassandra Kell |
| DF | 3 | Sacha Wainwright | (substituted off) 46' |
| DF | 4 | Dianne Alagich |
| DF | 5 | Cheryl Salisbury (c) |
| DF | 6 | Rhian Davies |
| MF | 15 | Tal Karp | (substituted off) 90+1' |
| MF | 2 | Gillian Foster |
| MF | 10 | Joanne Peters |
| MF | 11 | Heather Garriock |
| FW | 17 | Danielle Small |
| FW | 7 | Kelly Golebiowski |
Substitutions:
| MF | 8 | Bryony Duus | (substituted in) 46' |
| FW | 9 | April Mann | (substituted in) 90+1' |
Manager:
Adrian Santrac

| GK | 12 | Alla Volkova |
| DF | 2 | Tatiana Zaytseva |
| DF | 3 | Marina Burakova (c) |
| DF | 4 | Marina Saenko |
| DF | 18 | Anastasia Pustovoitova | | (substituted off) 67' |
| MF | 6 | Galina Komarova |
| MF | 7 | Tatiana Egorova | | (substituted off) 68' |
| MF | 14 | Oxana Shmachkova |
| MF | 13 | Elena Fomina | (yellow card) 83' |
| FW | 10 | Natalia Barbashina |
| FW | 11 | Olga Letyushova | (yellow card) 87' |
Substitutions:
| DF | 5 | Vera Stroukova | | (substituted in) 67' |
| MF | 15 | Tatiana Skotnikova | | (substituted in) 68' |
Manager:
Yuri Bystritsky

Player of the Match:
Natalia Barbashina (Russia)

Assistant referees:
Désirée Perpétué (Ivory Coast)
Florence Biagui (Senegal)
Fourth official:
Jennifer Bennett (United States)

=== China PR vs Ghana ===
September 21, 2003
20:15

| China | 1–0 | Ghana |
|---|---|---|
| Sun Wen 29' | Report |

Home Depot Center, Carson
Attendance: 15,239
Referee: Sonia Denoncourt (Canada)

| GK | 18 | Zhao Yan |
| DF | 3 | Li Jie |
| DF | 5 | Fan Yunjie |
| DF | 11 | Pu Wei |
| DF | 20 | Wang Liping |
| MF | 17 | Pan Lina | (substituted off) 36' |
| MF | 6 | Zhao Lihong | (substituted off) 88' |
| MF | 10 | Liu Ying |
| FW | 7 | Bai Jie |
| FW | 19 | Han Duan | (substituted off) 59' |
| FW | 9 | Sun Wen (c) |
Substitutions:
| MF | 12 | Qu Feifei | (substituted in) 36' |
| DF | 16 | Liu Yali | (substituted in) 59' |
| MF | 15 | Ren Liping | (substituted in) 88' |
Manager:
Ma Liangxing

| GK | 1 | Memunatu Sulemana |
| DF | 4 | Patience Sackey |
| DF | 3 | Mavis Danso | (yellow card) 90' |
| DF | 14 | Elizabeth Baidu |
| DF | 13 | Yaa Avoe | | (substituted off) 58' |
| DF | 16 | Lydia Ankrah |
| MF | 6 | Florence Okoe |
| MF | 7 | Genevive Clottey |
| FW | 10 | Adjoa Bayor |
| FW | 18 | Mavis Dgajmah | | (substituted off) 90+2' |
| FW | 15 | Alberta Sackey (c) | | (substituted off) 83' |
Substitutions:
| MF | 17 | Belinda Kanda | | (substituted in) 58' |
| FW | 8 | Myralyn Osei | | (substituted in) 83' |
| FW | 9 | Akua Anokyewaa | | (substituted in) 90+2' |
Manager:
Oko Aryee

Player of the Match:
Elizabeth Baidu (Ghana)

Assistant referees:
Denise Robinson (Canada)
Lynda Bramble (Trinidad and Tobago)
Fourth official:
Jennifer Bennett (United States)

=== Ghana vs Russia ===
September 25, 2003
16:15

| Ghana | 0–3 | Russia |
|---|---|---|
| | Report | Saenko 36'; Barbashina 54'; Letyushova 80' |

Home Depot Center, Carson
Attendance: 13,929
Referee: Kari Seitz (United States)

| GK | 1 | Memunatu Sulemana (c) |
| DF | 4 | Patience Sackey | (substituted off) 78' |
| DF | 3 | Mavis Danso |
| DF | 14 | Elizabeth Baidu |
| DF | 13 | Yaa Avoe | (substituted off) 58' |
| DF | 16 | Lydia Ankrah |
| MF | 6 | Florence Okoe |
| MF | 7 | Genevive Clottey |
| FW | 10 | Adjoa Bayor |
| FW | 18 | Mavis Dgajmah |
| FW | 8 | Myralyn Osei | (substituted off) 52' |
Substitutions:
| FW | 9 | Akua Anokyewaa | (substituted in) 52' |
| FW | 15 | Alberta Sackey | (substituted in) 58' |
| MF | 17 | Belinda Kanda | (substituted in) 78' |
Manager:
Oko Aryee

| GK | 12 | Alla Volkova |
| DF | 2 | Tatiana Zaytseva |
| DF | 3 | Marina Burakova (c) |
| DF | 4 | Marina Saenko | (substituted off) 74' |
| DF | 5 | Vera Stroukova |
| MF | 6 | Galina Komarova |
| MF | 7 | Tatiana Egorova | (substituted off) 59' |
| MF | 19 | Elena Denchtchik | (substituted off) 46' |
| MF | 13 | Elena Fomina |
| FW | 10 | Natalia Barbashina |
| FW | 11 | Olga Letyushova |
Substitutions:
| MF | 8 | Alexandra Svetlitskaya | (substituted in) 46' |
| MF | 15 | Tatyana Skotnikova | (substituted in) 59' |
| DF | 18 | Anastasia Pustovoitova | (substituted in) 74' |
Manager:
Yuri Bystritsky

Player of the Match:
Marina Saenko (Russia)

Assistant referees:
Karalee Sutton (United States)
Sharon Wheeler (United States)
Fourth official:
Jennifer Bennett (United States)

=== China PR vs Australia ===
September 25, 2003
19:00

| China | 1–1 | Australia |
|---|---|---|
| Bai Jie 46' | Report | Garriock 28' |

Home Depot Center, Carson
Attendance: 13,929
Referee: Katriina Elovirta (Finland)

| GK | 18 | Zhao Yan |
| DF | 3 | Li Jie |
| DF | 5 | Fan Yunjie |
| DF | 20 | Wang Liping |
| DF | 16 | Liu Yali |
| MF | 11 | Pu Wei |
| MF | 6 | Zhao Lihong | | (substituted off) 85' |
| MF | 10 | Liu Ying | (yellow card) 55' |
| MF | 8 | Zhang Ouying | | (substituted off) 74' |
| FW | 7 | Bai Jie | | (substituted off) 90' |
| FW | 9 | Sun Wen (c) |
Substitutions:
| MF | 15 | Ren Liping | | (substituted in) 74' |
| FW | 13 | Teng Wei | | (substituted in) 85' |
| MF | 12 | Qu Feifei | | (substituted in) 90' |
Manager:
Ma Liangxing

| GK | 1 | Cassandra Kell |
| DF | 13 | Karla Reuter |
| DF | 4 | Dianne Alagich | (yellow card) 89' |
| DF | 5 | Cheryl Salisbury (c) |
| DF | 6 | Rhian Davies |
| MF | 15 | Tal Karp |
| MF | 2 | Gillian Foster |
| MF | 10 | Joanne Peters |
| MF | 11 | Heather Garriock |
| FW | 17 | Danielle Small | | (substituted off) 76' |
| FW | 7 | Kelly Golebiowski | (yellow card) 90+1' |
Substitutions:
| MF | 8 | Bryony Duus | | (substituted in) 76' |
Manager:
Adrian Santrac

Player of the Match:
Cheryl Salisbury (Australia)

Assistant referees:
Emilia Parviainen (Finland)
Andi Regan (Northern Ireland)
Fourth official:
Jennifer Bennett (United States)

=== Ghana vs Australia ===
September 28, 2003
17:15

| Ghana | 2–1 | Australia |
|---|---|---|
| A. Sackey 34', 39' | Report | Garriock 61' |

PGE Park, Portland
Attendance: 19,132
Referee: Xonam Agboyi (Togo)

| GK | 1 | Memunatu Sulemana |
| DF | 4 | Patience Sackey |
| DF | 3 | Mavis Danso | | (substituted off) 75' |
| DF | 14 | Elizabeth Baidu |
| DF | 16 | Lydia Ankrah | (yellow card) 59' |
| MF | 6 | Florence Okoe |
| MF | 7 | Genevive Clottey |
| FW | 10 | Adjoa Bayor |
| FW | 11 | Gloria Foriwa | | (substituted off) 67' |
| FW | 18 | Mavis Dgajmah |
| FW | 15 | Alberta Sackey (c) |
Substitutions:
| DF | 13 | Yaa Avoe | | (substituted in) 75' |
| FW | 8 | Myralyn Osei | | (substituted in) 67' | (substituted off) 90+1' |
| FW | 9 | Akua Anokyewaa | | (substituted in) 90+1' |
Manager:
Oko Aryee

| GK | 12 | Melissa Barbieri |
| DF | 13 | Karla Reuter | | (substituted off) 90' |
| DF | 4 | Dianne Alagich |
| DF | 5 | Cheryl Salisbury (c) |
| DF | 6 | Rhian Davies |
| MF | 15 | Tal Karp | | (substituted off) 33' |
| MF | 2 | Gillian Foster | | (substituted off) 43' |
| MF | 10 | Joanne Peters |
| MF | 11 | Heather Garriock | (yellow card) 52' |
| FW | 17 | Danielle Small |
| FW | 7 | Kelly Golebiowski |
Substitutions:
| MF | 8 | Bryony Duus | | (substituted in) 33' |
| FW | 9 | April Mann | | (substituted in) 43' |
| DF | 14 | Pamela Grant | | (substituted in) 90' |
Manager:
Adrian Santrac

Player of the Match:
Adjoa Bayor (Ghana)

Assistant referees:
Désirée Perpétué (Ivory Coast)
Florence Biagui (Senegal)
Fourth official:
Kari Seitz (United States)

=== China PR vs Russia ===
September 28, 2003
20:00

| China | 1–0 | Russia |
|---|---|---|
| Bai Jie 16' | Report |

PGE Park, Portland
Attendance: 19,132
Referee: Florencia Romano (Argentina)

| GK | 1 | Han Wenxia |
| DF | 3 | Li Jie |
| DF | 5 | Fan Yunjie |
| DF | 11 | Pu Wei |
| DF | 20 | Wang Liping |
| DF | 16 | Liu Yali |
| MF | 6 | Zhao Lihong | (substituted off) 62' |
| MF | 10 | Liu Ying |
| MF | 14 | Bi Yan | (substituted off) 55' |
| FW | 7 | Bai Jie |
| FW | 9 | Sun Wen (c) |
Substitutions:
| MF | 12 | Qu Feifei | (substituted in) 55' |
| MF | 15 | Ren Liping | (substituted in) 62' |
Manager:
Ma Liangxing

| GK | 12 | Alla Volkova |
| DF | 2 | Tatiana Zaytseva |
| DF | 3 | Marina Burakova (c) |
| DF | 4 | Marina Saenko |
| DF | 5 | Vera Stroukova |
| MF | 6 | Galina Komarova |
| MF | 7 | Tatiana Egorova |
| MF | 8 | Alexandra Svetlitskaya |
| MF | 13 | Elena Fomina | (yellow card) 90' |
| FW | 10 | Natalia Barbashina |
| FW | 11 | Olga Letyushova | | (substituted off) 66' |
Substitutions:
| MF | 15 | Tatiana Skotnikova | | (substituted in) 66' |
Manager:
Yuri Bystritsky

Player of the Match:
Sun Wen (China PR)

Assistant referees:
Sabrina Lois (Argentina)
Alejandra Cercato (Argentina)
Fourth official:
Kari Seitz (United States)

== See also ==
- Australia at the FIFA Women's World Cup
- China at the FIFA Women's World Cup
- Ghana at the FIFA Women's World Cup
- Russia at the FIFA Women's World Cup
