= Liu Yali =

Liu Yali is the name of:

- Liu Yali (skier) (born 1968), Chinese Alpine skier
- Liu Yali (footballer) (born 1980), Chinese association footballer
