= European nations at the FIFA Women's World Cup =

Association football is among the most popular sports in Europe, with fourteen members of the Union of European Football Associations having competed at the sport's biggest international event, the FIFA Women's World Cup. The Women's World Cup has been won a total of 4 times by European nations, (Norway in 1995, Germany in 2003 and 2007, and Spain in 2023, respectively).

== Overview ==
	1991 (China) (12)	1995 (Sweden) (12)	1999 (United States) (16)	2003 (United States) (16)	2007 (China) (16)	2011 (Germany) (16)	2015 (Canada) (24)	2019 (France) (24)	2023 (Australia) (New Zealand) (32)	2027 (Brazil) (32)	2031 (Costa Rica) (Jamaica) (Mexico) (United States) (48)	2035 (England) (Northern Ireland) (Scotland) (Wales) (48)	Total
Teams	(Germany) (Norway) (Sweden) (Denmark) (Italy)	(Germany) (Norway) (Sweden) (Denmark) (England)	(Germany) (Norway) (Sweden) (Denmark) (Italy) (Russia)	(Germany) (Norway) (Sweden) (France) (Russia)	(Germany) (Norway) (Sweden) (Denmark) (England)	(Germany) (Norway) (Sweden) (France) (England)	(Germany) (Norway) (Sweden) (France) (England) (Netherlands) (Spain) (Switzerland)	(Germany) (Norway) (Sweden) (France) (England) (Netherlands) (Spain) (Italy) (Scotland)	(Germany) (Norway) (Sweden) (France) (England) (Netherlands) (Spain) (Denmark) (Italy) (Switzerland) (Portugal) (Republic of Ireland)	(Germany) (Spain) (France) (Denmark)		(England) (Northern Ireland) (Scotland) (Wales)	64
Top 16	—	—	—	—	—	—	7	8	8				23
Top 8	5	5	4	4	3	4	3	7	5				40
Top 4	3	2	1	2	2	2	2	3	3				20
Top 2	1	2	0	2	1	0	0	1	2				9
1st		(Norway)		(Germany)	(Germany)				(Spain)				4
2nd	(Norway)	(Germany)		(Sweden)				(Netherlands)	(England)				5
3rd	(Sweden)					(Sweden)	(England)	(Sweden)	(Sweden)				5
4th	(Germany)		(Norway)		(Norway)	(France)	(Germany)	(England)					6

Country	#	Years	Best result
Germany	9	1991, 1995, 1999, 2003, 2007, 2011, 2015, 2019, 2023	1st
Norway	9	1991, 1995, 1999, 2003, 2007, 2011, 2015, 2019, 2023	1st
Spain	3	2015, 2019, 2023	1st
Sweden	9	1991, 1995, 1999, 2003, 2007, 2011, 2015, 2019, 2023	2nd
England	6	1995, 2007, 2011, 2015, 2019, 2023	2nd
France	5	2003, 2011, 2015, 2019, 2023	4th
Denmark	5	1991, 1995, 1999, 2007, 2023	QF
Italy	4	1991, 1999, 2019, 2023	QF
Netherlands	3	2015, 2019, 2023	2nd
Russia	2	1999, 2003	QF
Switzerland	2	2015, 2023	R2
Scotland	1	2019	GS
Portugal	1	2023	GS
Republic of Ireland	1	2023	GS
Northern Ireland	1	2035	TBD
Wales	1	2035	TBD

== Results ==
=== Most finishes in the top four ===
Team	#	Top-four finishes
Germany	5	1991, 1995, 2003, 2007, 2015
Sweden	5	1991, 2003, 2011, 2019, 2023
Norway	4	1991, 1995, 1999, 2007
England	3	2015, 2019, 2023
Spain	1	2023
Netherlands	1	2019
France	1	2011

=== Team results by tournament ===
Legend

- 1st — Champions
- 2nd — Runners-up
- 3rd — Third place
- 4th — Fourth place
- QF — Quarter-finals
- R2 — Round 2
- R1 — Round 1
- Q — Qualified for upcoming tournament
- TBD — To be determined (may still qualify for upcoming tournament)
- •• — Qualified but withdrew
- • — Did not qualify
- × — Did not enter / Withdrew / Banned
- — Hosts
- — Not affiliated in FIFA

The team ranking in each tournament is according to FIFA. The rankings, apart from the top four positions, are not a result of direct competition between the teams; instead, teams eliminated in the same round are ranked by their full results in the tournament. In recent tournaments, FIFA has used the rankings for seedings for the final tournament draw.

For each tournament, the number of teams in each finals tournament (in brackets) are shown.

Team	1991 (China) (12)	1995 (Sweden) (12)	1999 (United States) (16)	2003 (United States) (16)	2007 (China) (16)	2011 (Germany) (16)	2015 (Canada) (24)	2019 (France) (24)	2023 (Australia) (New Zealand) (32)	2027 (Brazil) (32)	2031 (Mexico) (United States) (48)	2035 (England) (Northern Ireland) (Scotland) (Wales) (48)	Total	Qual. Comp.
Denmark	QF; 7th	QF; 7th	R1; 15th	•	R1; 12th	•	•	•	R2; 9th	Q	TBD	TBD	5	12
England	•	QF; 6th	•	•	QF; 7th	QF; 7th	3rd	4th	2nd	TBD	TBD	Q	6	12
France	•	•	•	R1; 9th	•	4th	QF; 5th	QF; 6th	QF; 6th	Q	TBD	TBD	5	12
Germany	4th	2nd	QF; 8th	1st	1st	QF; 6th	4th	QF; 5th	R1; 17th	Q	TBD	TBD	9	12
Italy	QF; 6th	•	R1; 9th	•	•	•	•	QF; 7th	R1; 22nd	TBD	TBD	TBD	4	12
Netherlands	•	•	•	•	•	•	R2; 13th	2nd	QF; 8th	TBD	TBD	TBD	3	12
Northern Ireland	•	×	×	×	•	•	•	•	•	•	TBD	Q	1	12
Norway	2nd	1st	4th	QF; 7th	4th	R1; 10th	R2; 10th	QF; 8th	R2; 15th	TBD	TBD	TBD	9	12
Portugal	×	•	•	•	•	•	•	•	R1; 19th	TBD	TBD	TBD	1	10
Republic of Ireland	•	×	•	•	•	•	•	•	R1; 26th	TBD	TBD	TBD	1	12
Russia	×	•	QF; 5th	QF; 8th	•	•	•	•	×	×	TBD	TBD	2	11
Scotland	×	•	•	•	•	•	•	R1; 19th	•	TBD	TBD	Q	1	11
Spain	•	•	•	•	•	•	R1; 20th	R2; 12th	1st	Q	TBD	TBD	3	9
Sweden	3rd	QF; 5th	QF; 6th	2nd	R1; T-10th	3rd	R2; 16th	3rd	3rd	TBD	TBD	TBD	9	12
Switzerland	•	•	•	•	•	•	R2; 15th	•	R2; 14th	TBD	TBD	TBD	2	12
Wales	×	•	•	•	•	•	•	•	•	•	TBD	Q	1	12

=== Tournament standings ===
Team	Champions	Finals	Semi-finals	Quarter-finals	Second round
Germany	2	1	2	3	0
Norway	1	1	2	2	2
Spain	1	0	0	0	1
Sweden	0	1	4	2	1
Netherlands	0	1	0	1	1
England	0	1	2	3	0
France	0	0	1	3	0
Denmark	0	0	0	2	1
Italy	0	0	0	2	0
Russia	0	0	0	2	0
Switzerland	0	0	0	0	2

=== Overall team records ===
As per statistical convention in football, matches decided in extra time are counted as wins and losses, while matches decided by penalty shoot-outs are counted as draws. 3 points per win, 1 point per draw and 0 points per loss.

Results through 2019 FIFA Women's World Cup

Team	Pld	W	D	L	GF	GA	GD	Pts
Germany	44	30	5	9	121	39	+82	95
Norway	40	24	4	12	93	52	+41	76
Sweden	40	23	5	12	71	48	+23	74
England	26	15	4	7	43	30	+13	49
France	19	10	3	6	32	20	+12	33
Netherlands	11	7	1	3	14	9	+5	22
Italy	12	6	1	5	20	12	+8	19
Russia	8	4	0	4	16	14	+2	12
Denmark	14	3	1	10	19	26	–7	10
Spain	7	1	2	4	6	8	–2	5
Switzerland	4	1	0	3	11	5	+6	3
Scotland	3	0	1	2	5	7	–2	1

== Appearances ==
=== Ranking of teams by number of appearances ===
Team	Appearances	Record streak	Active streak	Debut	Most recent	Best result (* = hosts)
Germany	9	9	9	1991	2023	Champions (2003, 2007)
Norway	9	9	9	1991	2023	Champions (1995)
Spain	3	3	3	2015	2023	Champions (2023)
Sweden	9	9	9	1991	2023	Runners-up (2003)
England	7	6	6	1995	2035	Runners-up (2023)
Denmark	5	3	1	1991	2023	Quarter-finals (1991, 1995)
France	5	4	4	2003	2023	Fourth place (2011)
Italy	4	2	2	1991	2023	Quarter-finals (1991, 2019)
Netherlands	3	3	3	2015	2023	Runners-up (2019)
Russia	2	2	0	1999	2003	Quarter-finals (1999, 2003)
Switzerland	2	1	1	2015	2023	Round of 16 (2015, 2023)
Scotland	2	2	1	2019	2035	Group stage (2019)
Portugal	1	1	1	2023	2023	Group stage (2023)
Republic of Ireland	1	1	1	2023	2023	Group stage (2023)
Northern Ireland	1	1	1	2023	2035	TBD (2035)
Wales	1	1	1	2035	2035	TBD (2035)

=== Team debuts ===
Year	Debutants	Total
1991	Denmark, Germany, Italy, Norway, Sweden	5
1995	England	1
1999	Russia	1
2003	France	1
2015	Netherlands, Spain, Switzerland	3
2019	Scotland	1
2023	Portugal, Republic of Ireland	2
2035	Northern Ireland, Wales	2
Total		16

== Summary of performance ==
This table shows the number of countries represented at the Women's World Cup, the number of entries (#E) from around the world including any rejections and withdrawals, the number of European entries (#A), how many of those European entries withdrawn (#A-) before/during qualification or were rejected by FIFA, the European representatives at the Women's World Cup finals, the number of World Cup Qualifiers each European representative had to play to get to the World Cup (#WCQ), the furthest stage reached, results, and coaches.

Year	Host	Size	#E	#A	#A-	European finalists	#WCQ	Stage	Results	Coach
1991	China	12	48	18	0	Denmark	10	Quarter-finals	won 3–0 v New Zealand, drew 2–2 v China, lost 1–2 v Norway, lost 1–2 (a.e.t.) v Germany	(Denmark) Keld Gantzhorn
1991	China	12	48	18	0	Germany	10	Fourth place	won 4–0 v Nigeria, won 2–0 v Chinese Taipei, won 2–0 v Italy, won 2–1 (a.e.t.) v Denmark , lost 2–5 v United States, lost 0–4 v Sweden	(Germany) Gero Bisanz
1991	China	12	48	18	0	Italy	10	Quarter-finals	won 5–0 Chinese Taipei, won 1–0 Nigeria, lost 0–2 Germany, lost 2–3 Norway (a.e.t.)	(Italy) Sergio Guenza
1991	China	12	48	18	0	Norway	10	Runners-up	lost 0–4 China, won 4–0 New Zealand, won 2–1 Denmark, won 3–2 Italy (a.e.t.), won 4–1 Sweden, lost 1–2 United States	(Norway) Even Pellerud
1991	China	12	48	18	0	Sweden	8	Third place	lost 2–3 United States, won 8–0 Japan, won 2–0 Brazil, won 1–0 China, lost 1–4 Norway, won 4–0 Germany	(Sweden) Gunilla Paijkull
1995	Sweden	12	55	30	1	Denmark	10	Quarter-finals	won 5–0 Australia, lost 0–2 United States, lost 1–3 China, lost 1–3 Norway	(Denmark) Keld Gantzhorn
1995	Sweden	12	55	30	1	England	6	Quarter-finals	won 3–2 Canada, lost 0–2 Norway, won 3–2 Nigeria, lost 0–3 Germany	(England) Ted Copeland
1995	Sweden	12	55	30	1	Germany	10	Runners-up	won 1–0 Japan, lost 2–3 Sweden, won 6–1 Brazil, won 3–0 England, won 1–0 China, lost 0–2 Norway	(Germany) Gero Bisanz
1995	Sweden	12	55	30	1	Norway	10	Champions	won 8–0 Nigeria, won 2–0 England, won 7–0 Canada, won 3–1 Denmark, won 1–0 United States, won 2–0 Germany	(Norway) Even Pellerud
1995	Sweden	12	55	30	1	Sweden	8	Quarter-finals	lost 0–1 Brazil, won 3–2 Germany, won 2–0 Japan, drew 1–1 China (lost 3–4 (p))	(Sweden) Bengt Simonsson
1999	United States	16	67	16	18	Denmark	6	Group stage	lost 0–3 United States, lost 1–3 North Korea, lost 0–2 Nigeria	(Denmark) Jørgen Hvidemose
1999	United States	16	67	16	18	Germany	8	Quarter-finals	drew 1–1 Italy, won 6–0 Mexico, drew 3–3 Brazil, lost 2–3 Germany	(Germany) Tina Theune-Meyer
1999	United States	16	67	16	18	Italy	6	Group stage	drew 1–1 Germany, lost 0–2 Brazil, won 2–0 Mexico	(Italy) Carlo Facchin
1999	United States	16	67	16	18	Norway	6	Fourth place	won 2–1 Russia, won 7–1 Canada, won 4–0 Japan, won 3–1 Sweden, lost 0–5 China, drew 0–0 Brazil (lost 4–5 (p))	(Norway) Per-Mathias Høgmo
1999	United States	16	67	16	18	Russia	8	Quarter-finals	lost 1–2 Norway, won 5–0 Japan, won 4–1 Canada, lost 0–2 China	(Russia) Yuri Bystritsky
1999	United States	16	67	16	18	Sweden	6	Quarter-finals	lost 1–2 China, won 3–1 Australia, won 2–0 Ghana, lost 1–3 Norway	(Sweden) Marika Domanski-Lyfors
2003	United States	16	99	16	18	France	10	Group stage	lost 0–2 Norway, won 1–0 South Korea, drew 1–1 Brazil	(France) Élisabeth Loisel
2003	United States	16	99	16	18	Germany	6	Champions	won 4–1 Canada, won 3–0 Japan, won 6–1 Argentina, won 7–1 Russia, won 3–0 United States, won 2–1 Sweden (g.g.)	(Germany) Tina Theune-Meyer
2003	United States	16	99	16	18	Norway	6	Quarter-finals	won 2–0 France, lost 1–4 Brazil, won 7–1 South Korea, lost 0–1 United States	(Norway) Åge Steen
2003	United States	16	99	16	18	Russia	6	Quarter-finals	won 2–1 Australia, won 3–0 Ghana, lost 0–1 China, lost 1–7 Germany	(Russia) Yuri Bystritsky
2003	United States	16	99	16	18	Sweden	6	Runners-up	lost 1–3 United States, won 1–0 North Korea, won 3–0 Nigeria, won 2–1 Brazil, won 2–1 Canada, lost 1–2 Germany (g.g.)	(Sweden) Marika Domanski-Lyfors
2007	China	16	120	25	15	Denmark	8	Group stage	lost 2–3 China, won 2–0 New Zealand, lost 0–1 Brazil	(Denmark) Kenneth Heiner-Møller
2007	China	16	120	25	15	England	8	Quarter-finals	drew 2–2 Japan, drew 0–0 Germany, won 6–1 Argentina, lost 0–3 United States	(England) Hope Powell
2007	China	16	120	25	15	Germany	8	Champions	won 11–0 Argentina, drew 0–0 England, won 2–0 Japan, won 3–0 North Korea, won 3–0 Norway, won 2–0 Brazil	(Germany) Silvia Neid
2007	China	16	120	25	15	Norway	8	Fourth place	won 2–1 Canada, drew 1–1 Australia, won 7–2 Ghana, won 1–0 China, lost 0–3 Germany, lost 1–4 United States	(Norway) Bjarne Berntsen
2007	China	16	120	25	15	Sweden	8	Group stage	drew 1–1 Nigeria, lost 0–2 United States, won 2–1 North Korea	(Sweden) Thomas Dennerby
2011	Germany	16	125	41	0	England	10	Quarter-finals	drew 1–1 Mexico, won 2–1 New Zealand, won 2–0 Japan, drew 1–1 France (lost 3–4 (p))	(England) Hope Powell
2011	Germany	16	125	41	0	France	12	Fourth place	won 1–0 Nigeria, won 4–0 Canada, lost 2–4 Germany, drew 1–1 England (won 4–3 (p)), lost 1–3 United States, lost 1–2 Sweden	(France) Bruno Bini
2011	Germany	16	125	41	0	Germany	Hosts	Quarter-finals	won 2–1 Canada, won 1–0 Nigeria, won 4–2 France, lost 0–1 Japan (a.e.t.)	(Germany) Silvia Neid
2011	Germany	16	125	41	0	Norway	10	Group stage	won 1–0 Equatorial Guinea, lost 0–3 Brazil, lost 1–2 Australia	(Norway) Eli Landsem
2011	Germany	16	125	41	0	Sweden	10	Third place	won 1–0 Colombia, won 1–0 North Korea, won 2–1 United States, won 3–1 Australia, lost 1–3 Japan, won 2–1 France	(Sweden) Thomas Dennerby
2015	Canada	24	134	46	0	England	10	Third place	lost 0–1 France, won 2–1 Mexico, won 2–1 Colombia, won 2–1 Norway, won 2–1 Canada, lost 1–2 Japan, won 1–0 Germany (a.e.t.)	(Wales) Mark Sampson
2015	Canada	24	134	46	0	France	10	Quarter-finals	won 1–0 England, lost 0–2 Colombia, won 5–0 Mexico, won 3–0 South Korea, drew 1–1 Germany (lost 4–5 (p))	(France) Philippe Bergeroo
2015	Canada	24	134	46	0	Germany	10	Fourth place	won 10–0 Ivory Coast, drew 1–1 Norway, won 4–0 Thailand, won 4–1 Sweden, drew 0–0 France (lwon 5–4 (p)), lost 0–2 United States, lost 0–1 England (a.e.t.)	(Germany) Silvia Neid
2015	Canada	24	134	46	0	Netherlands	14	Round of 16	won 1–0 New Zealand, lost 0–1 China, drew 1–1 Canada, lost 1–2 Japan	(Netherlands) Roger Reijners
2015	Canada	24	134	46	0	Norway	10	Round of 16	won 4–0 Thailand, drew 1–1 Germany, won 3–1 Ivory Coast, lost 1–2 England	(Norway) Even Pellerud
2015	Canada	24	134	46	0	Spain	10	Group stage	drew 1–1 Costa Rica, lost 0–1 Brazil, lost 1–2 South Korea	(Spain) Ignacio Quereda
2015	Canada	24	134	46	0	Sweden	10	Round of 16	drew 3–3 Nigeria, drew 0–0 United States, drew 1–1 Australia, lost 1–4 Germany	(Sweden) Pia Sundhage
2015	Canada	24	134	46	0	Switzerland	10	Round of 16	lost 0–1 Japan, won 10–1 Ecuador, lost 1–2 Cameroon, lost 0–1 Canada	(Germany) Martina Voss-Tecklenburg
2019	France	24	144	46	0	England	8	Fourth place	won 2–1 Scotland, won 1–0 Argentina, won 2–0 Japan, won 3–0 Cameroon, won 3–0 Norway, lost 1–2 United States, lost 1–2 Sweden	(England) Phil Neville
2019	France	24	144	46	0	France	Hosts	Quarter-finals	won 4–0 South Korea, won 2–1 Norway, won 1–0 Nigeria, won 2–1 Brazil (a.e.t.), lost 1–2 United States	(France) Corinne Diacre
2019	France	24	144	46	0	Germany	8	Quarter-finals	won 1–0 China, won 1–0 Spain, won 4–0 South Africa, won 3–0 Nigeria, lost 1–2 Sweden	(Germany) Martina Voss-Tecklenburg
2019	France	24	144	46	0	Italy	8	Quarter-finals	won 2–1 Australia, won 5–0 Jamaica, lost 0–1 Brazil, won 2–0 China, lost 0–2 Netherlands	(Italy) Milena Bertolini
2019	France	24	144	46	0	Netherlands	12	Runners-up	won 1–0 New Zealand, won 3–1 Cameroon, won 2–1 Canada, won 2–1 Japan, won 2–0 Italy, won 1–0 Sweden (a.e.t.), lost 0–2 United States	(Netherlands) Sarina Wiegman
2019	France	24	144	46	0	Norway	8	Quarter-finals	won 3–0 Nigeria, lost 1–2 France, won 2–1 South Korea, drew 1–1 Australia (won 4–1 (p)), lost 0–3 England	(Sweden) Martin Sjögren
2019	France	24	144	46	0	Scotland	8	Group stage	lost 1–2 England, lost 1–2 Japan, drew 3–3 Argentina	(Scotland) Shelley Kerr
2019	France	24	144	46	0	Spain	8	Round of 16	won 3–1 South Africa, lost 0–1 Germany, drew 0–0 China, lost 1–2 United States	(Spain) Jorge Vilda
2019	France	24	144	46	0	Sweden	8	Third place	won 2–0 Chile, won 5–1 Thailand, lost 0–2 United States, won 1–0 Canada, won 2–1 Germany, lost 0–1 Netherlands (a.e.t.), won 2–1 England	(Sweden) Peter Gerhardsson
2023	Australia; New Zealand	32	172	51	0	Denmark	9	Round of 16	won 1–0 China, lost 0–1 England, won 2–0 Haiti, lost 0–2 Australia	(Denmark) Lars Søndergaard
2023	Australia; New Zealand	32	172	51	0	England	10	Runners-up	won 1–0 Haiti, won 1–0 Denmark, won 6–1 China, drew 0–0 Nigeria (won 4–2 (p)), won 2–1 Colombia, won 3–1 Australia, lost 0–1 Spain	(Netherlands) Sarina Wiegman
2023	Australia; New Zealand	32	172	51	0	France	10	Quarter-finals	drew 0–0 Jamaica, won 2–1 Brazil, won 6–3 Panama, won 4–0 Morocco, drew 0–0 Australia (lost 6–7 (p))	(France) Hervé Renard
2023	Australia; New Zealand	32	172	51	0	Germany	10	Group stage	won 6–0 Morocco, lost 1–2 Colombia, drew 1–1 South Korea	(Germany) Martina Voss-Tecklenburg
2023	Australia; New Zealand	32	172	51	0	Italy	10	Group stage	won 1–0 Argentina, lost 0–5 Sweden, lost 2–3 South Africa	(Italy) Milena Bertolini
2023	Australia; New Zealand	32	172	51	0	Netherlands	8	Quarter-finals	won 1–0 Portugal, drew 1–1 United States, won 7–0 Vietnam, won 2–0 South Africa, lost 1–2 Spain (a.e.t.)	(Netherlands) Andries Jonker
2023	Australia; New Zealand	32	172	51	0	Norway	10	Round of 16	lost 0–1 New Zealand, drew 0–0 Switzerland, won 6–0 Philippines, lost 1–3 Japan	(Norway) Hege Riise
2023	Australia; New Zealand	32	172	51	0	Portugal	13	Group stage	lost 0–1 Portugal, won 2–0 Vietnam, drew 0–0 United States	(Portugal) Francisco Neto
2023	Australia; New Zealand	32	172	51	0	Republic of Ireland	9	Group stage	lost 0–1 Australia, lost 1–2 Canada, drew 0–0 Nigeria	(Netherlands) Vera Pauw
2023	Australia; New Zealand	32	172	51	0	Spain	8	Champions	won 3–0 Costa Rica, won 3–0 Zambia, lost 0–4 Japan, won 5–1 Switzerland, won 2–1 Netherlands (a.e.t.), won 2–1 Sweden, won 1–0 England	(Spain) Jorge Vilda
2023	Australia; New Zealand	32	172	51	0	Sweden	8	Third place	won 2–1 South Africa, won 5–0 Italy, won 2–0 Argentina, drew 0–0 United States (won 5–4 (p)), won 2–1 Japan, lost 1–2 Spain, won 2–0 Australia	(Sweden) Peter Gerhardsson
2023	Australia; New Zealand	32	172	51	0	Switzerland	11	Round of 16	won 2–0 Philippines, drew 0–0 Norway, drew 0–0 New Zealand, lost 1–5 Spain	(Germany) Inka Grings

== Not yet qualified ==
41 of the 55 active FIFA and UEFA members have never appeared in the final tournament.

Legend

- TBD — To be determined (may still qualify for upcoming tournament)
- • — Did not qualify
- × — Did not enter / Withdrew / Banned
- — Not affiliated in FIFA
- •• — Qualified, but withdrew before Finals

Country	Number of Qualifying attempts	1991 (China)	1995 (Sweden)	1999 (United States)	2003 (United States)	2007 (China)	2011 (Germany)	2015 (Canada)	2019 (France)	2023 (Australia) (New Zealand)	2027 (Brazil)	2031 (Mexico) (United States)	2035 (England) (Northern Ireland) (Scotland) (Wales)
Albania	3	×	×	×	×	×	×	•	•	•	TBD	TBD	TBD
Andorra	1	×	×	×	×	×	×	×	•	×	•	TBD	TBD
Armenia	2	×^{1}	×	×	×	×	•	×	×	•	•	TBD	TBD
Austria	6	×	×	×	•	•	•	•	•	•	TBD	TBD	TBD
Azerbaijan	2	×^{1}	×	×	×	×	•	×	×	•	•	TBD	TBD
Belarus	7	×^{1}	×	•	•	•	•	•	•	•	TBD	TBD	TBD
Belgium	9	•	•	•	•	•	•	•	•	•	TBD	TBD	TBD
Bosnia and Herzegovina	7	×^{2}	×	•	•	•	•	•	•	•	•	TBD	TBD
Bulgaria	6	•	•	•	×	×	•	•	×	•	•	TBD	TBD
Croatia	6	×^{2}	×	×	•	•	•	•	•	•	TBD	TBD	TBD
Cyprus	1	×	×	×	×	×	×	×	×	•	•	TBD	TBD
Czech Republic	9	•^{3}	•	•	•	•	•	•	•	•	TBD	TBD	TBD
Estonia	7	×^{1}	×	•	•	•	•	•	•	•	•	TBD	TBD
Faroe Islands	3	×	×	×	×	×	×	•	•	•	•	TBD	TBD
Finland	9	•	•	•	•	•	•	•	•	•	TBD	TBD	TBD
Georgia	4	×^{1}	×	×	×	×	•	•	•	•	•	TBD	TBD
Gibraltar	0	Not a member of UEFA							×	×	•	TBD	TBD
Greece	8	×	•	•	•	•	•	•	•	•	TBD	TBD	TBD
Hungary	9	•	•	•	•	•	•	•	•	•	TBD	TBD	TBD
Iceland	8	×	•	•	•	•	•	•	•	•	TBD	TBD	TBD
Israel	7	×^{4}	×	•	•	•	•	•	•	•	TBD	TBD	TBD
Kazakhstan	5	Member of AFC^{1}			×	•	•	•	•	•	TBD	TBD	TBD
Kosovo	2	Not a member of UEFA^{2}							•	•	TBD	TBD	TBD
Latvia	4	×^{1}	•	×	×	×	×	•	•	•	•	TBD	TBD
Liechtenstein	0	×	×	×	×	×	×	×	×	×	•	TBD	TBD
Lithuania	5	×^{1}	•	•	×	×	×	•	•	•	TBD	TBD	TBD
Luxembourg	3	×	×	×	×	×	×	•	•	•	•	TBD	TBD
Malta	5	×	×	×	×	•	•	•	•	•	•	TBD	TBD
Moldova	4	×^{1}	×	×	•	•	×	×	•	•	•	TBD	TBD
Montenegro	3	Part of Yugoslavia and Serbia and Montenegro						•	•	•	•	TBD	TBD
North Macedonia	3	×^{2}	×	×	×	×	•	•	×	•	•	TBD	TBD
Poland	9	•	•	•	•	•	•	•	•	•	TBD	TBD	TBD
Romania	8	×	•	•	•	•	•	•	•	•	TBD	TBD	TBD
San Marino	0	×	×	×	×	×	×	×	×	×	×	TBD	TBD
Serbia	7	×^{2}	×^{2}	•^{2}	•^{2}	•	•	•	•	•	TBD	TBD	TBD
Slovakia	8	×^{3}	•	•	•	•	•	•	•	•	TBD	TBD	TBD
Slovenia	6	×^{2}	•	×	×	•	•	•	•	•	TBD	TBD	TBD
Turkey	6	×	×	•	•	×	•	•	•	•	TBD	TBD	TBD
Ukraine	8	×^{1}	•	•	•	•	•	•	•	•	TBD	TBD	TBD

Notes:

- ^{1}Part of Soviet Union
- ^{2}Part of Yugoslavia and Serbia and Montenegro
- ^{3}Part of Czechoslovakia
- ^{4}Not a member of UEFA

== Competitive history ==
=== 1991: early European domination ===
The UEFA Women's Euro 1991, which served as the direct qualification tickets for the 1991 FIFA Women's World Cup in China, saw Germany, Italy, Norway and Denmark represented Europe, while Sweden was the lucky loser to join the tournament as well, having failed to qualify for the tournament but achieved the best records among the playoff losers. In just the first World Cup season, Europe immediately demonstrated its women's football quality no less inferior than the men's counterparts. Denmark and Italy reached the quarter-finals, where their journey ended in the quarter-finals to the hand of Germany and Norway. Both Germany and Norway, together with Sweden, went on to finish among top 4; the Germans lost to the United States 2–5 in the quarter-finals, while Norway overcame fellow European opponent Sweden 4–1. Sweden went to take third place by beating Germany 4–0 while Norway lost 1–2 to the United States, missing the opportunity to bring home first Women's World Cup title.

=== 1995: first European triumph and England's debut ===
The UEFA Women's Euro 1995, played with the same format of qualifying like 1991, saw Denmark, Norway, England and Germany joined the 1995 World Cup tournament held in Sweden, with Denmark being the lucky loser to qualify. Europe once again proved domination, and this time, was far more successful, with Denmark, England and hosts Sweden reached the last eight, where they lost to Norway, Germany and China in process. Norway and Germany moved on to reach the final, where the Norwegians corrected the failure of 1991 final by winning 2–0, making it the first major FIFA triumph for the Nordic side.

=== 1999: Italy's return, Russia's debut, and less success ===
After the impressive displays of European sides in the first two editions, the 1999 tournament in the United States saw Europe organised the first ever separate qualification instead of using the continental tournament like the other confederations. With the new qualification system, Italy returned after missing the 1995 edition, while Russia debuted, joining with Germany, Sweden, Norway and Denmark as well. The tournament proved to be a sour note for Europe, with Denmark and Italy became the first European teams to fail to progress from the group stage, with Denmark the worst-performed team with one goal scored and no point. Russia, Sweden and Germany could not do better when reaching the last eight, losing to China, Norway and the United States, respectively. Norway, then-world champions, suffered an agonising 0–5 loss to China in the semi-finals, thus failed to defend the title, yet Norway could not even win an honourable medal after losing to Brazil on penalty for third place.

=== 2003: beginning of German domination ===
The 2003 qualification saw Italy and Denmark, two worst-performed teams from Europe back in 1999, failed to qualify for the 2003 edition, also hosted in the United States. France became the debutant in the tournament, joining Russia, Sweden, Germany and Norway.

After the disappointing 1999 show, Europe reclaimed its prestige in 2003 in style. With the exception of France, the other four progressed to the knockout phase: Russia were crushed 1–7 by Germany, Sweden beat Brazil 2–1 while Norway fell 0–1 to the American hosts. Subsequently, Germany and Sweden overcame North American representatives the United States and Canada to make the all-out second European final, where Germany triumphed 2–1 after an extra-time golden goal, to give Germany the first Women's World Cup title. By doing so, Germany became the first, and so far, the only country in the world to win both men's and women's World Cup.

=== 2007: Germany at peak, England and Denmark's return ===
The 2007 qualification witnessed England and Denmark returned to the tournament, with England qualified after missing two previous editions, while Denmark returned after missing 2003, joining old forces Germany, Norway and Sweden.

The tournament was a major success for Europe, although this also marked the elimination from the group stage of both Denmark and Sweden, the latter was a shock one, failed to reach the knockout stage for the first time despite a 2–1 win over North Korea. England reached the quarter-finals, where they lost to the United States 0–3. Norway and Germany subsequently reached the semi-finals where they faced each other, which the Germans won 3–0. Germany was impressive throughout the tournament, topping the group stage undefeated and beating North Korea and Norway with the same scoreline, and finally made history by winning Brazil 2–0 in the final to successfully defend the title. Germany was the first team to win two consecutive World Cup, but moreover, Germany was the first national team in either gender to have won the World Cup without conceding a single goal in process.

=== 2011: Europe getting stunned by Asia ===
The 2011 qualification saw France's return and Denmark's absent, joining England, Sweden and Norway to the World Cup held in Germany, then-world champions. With the rich European history of participation, Europe was expected to become a dominant force again.

However, once the World Cup started, the tournament became a nightmare for both Norway and hosts Germany, Europe's only world champions. Norway was knocked out of the group stage after suffering shock loss to Australia 1–2 in the final game, a game Norway must win to qualify. For Germany, after winning three consecutive group stage games, Germany met Japan, who was the underdog of the tournament, but Germany could not find the way to break through after 120 minutes; instead, the Germans got a shock punishment in the extra-time by a very disciplined Japanese side, and crashed out of the quarter-finals in the disbelief of home fans. Sweden went to reach the knockout stage as top finisher of its group, beating Australia 3–1 at the quarter-finals but suffered a shock loss in the semi-finals to Japan with the same scoreline. France went on to eliminate England in the last eight on penalty shootout, but losses to the United States and Sweden denied France a top three finish.

=== 2015: Record debutants, but getting sidelined ===
The 2015 qualification welcomed a historic record as three new European representatives, Spain, Switzerland and the Netherlands, joined the World Cup, alongside Germany, Sweden, Norway, England and France. With eight European sides, Europe was hoping to regain its status after being humiliated by then-world champions Japan four years earlier.

Sweden and Norway had rather unimpressive displays in the competition, more for the former as Sweden only qualified to the round of 16 after three consecutive draws to Nigeria, the United States and Australia, before getting routed by Germany 1–4; Norway did better by finishing second with similar points to Germany (7), but Norway got eliminated by England 1–2. The Netherlands and Switzerland also booked their places in the knockout stage for the first time, finished as two best third-placed team, before went on to be eliminated by Japan and Canada respectively. France reached the quarter-finals of the tournament after topping the group stage (though with an imperfect performance), beating South Korea 3–0 and then lost to Germany on penalty shootout 4–5 after a goalless draw in 120 minutes. England and Germany, meanwhile, became the best-performed teams in that tournament, reaching the semi-finals, but had their journey ended with defeats to Japan and the United States. In the battle for third place, Germany lost to England for the first time ever, with a 0–1 loss in extra time, making England the best-performed team from Europe, which was seen as a revelation after the England men's side failed disastrously in the men's 2014 FIFA World Cup as the worst-performed team from Europe in that edition. Meanwhile, Spain turned out to be the worst-performed team in the Women's World Cup instead, as Spain's debut ended in disaster after getting only just a point against Costa Rica and losses to Brazil and South Korea, despite being highly favoured to progress.

=== 2019: restoration of European domination, but without a title ===
The 2019 qualification marked historic debut for Scotland while Italy ended its World Cup drought after 20 years. Together, Italy and Scotland joined Germany, Sweden, Norway, England, France, the Netherlands and Spain. France were the hosts of the 2019 edition.

The 2019 edition was significant as for the first time, Europe snatched a football record, with seven teams reaching the last eight. France and Norway dominated group A, overpowered Nigeria and South Korea. Group B also saw Germany and Spain occupied two first places in the group. Italy, meanwhile, stunned Australia and Brazil in its return to occupy top of the group C. Group D also witnessed England seized top of the group, the same also came in group E with the Netherlands did the same. Sweden was the only team from Europe not to top the group (Norway and Spain were drawn with other European opponents), though by finishing second in group F, Sweden also progressed to the last sixteen. All European representatives in the last sixteen, except for Spain, were able to win their respective encounters, making three out of four quarter-finals meetings European affairs. Eventually, England, Sweden and the Netherlands went on to the semi-finals, where the Dutch surprised Sweden with a 1–0 win while England fell to the United States 1–2. Sweden took bronze after beating England 2–1 while the Netherlands, in the historic World Cup final in its just second appearance, were denied of the prize after losing to the defending champions United States 0–2.

Outside of Spain's failure, the other European side, Scotland, left disappointingly, having bravely fought against England and Japan (both lost 1–2), but suffered a shock comeback from three goals lead into a 3–3 draw to minnows Argentina, crashed out of the group stage.

=== 2023: all-European final and Spain's first title ===
The 2023 qualification, finished in September 2022, chose out which sides to qualify for the World Cup in Australia and New Zealand. Italy, Norway, Ireland, Spain, England, Sweden, Germany, France, Switzerland, the Netherlands, Denmark, and Portugal qualified. However, the qualification was negatively impacted following the 2022 Russian invasion of Ukraine, which saw Russia disqualified from the tournament. There was an all-European World Cup final, a first since 2003, when first-time finalists Spain defeated fellow final debutants England.
