= Myralyn Osei Agyemang =

Ghanaian footballer

Mimi Nartey
Personal information
- Full name: Myralyn Nartey
- Date of birth: 5 November 1981 (age 44)
- Place of birth: United States
- Position: Forward

Senior career*
Years	Team	Apps	(Gls)
2001–2003	Portland Rain		

International career^{‡}
1998–2003	Ghana	3	(0)
- * Club domestic league appearances and goals ‡ National team caps and goals as of 29 September 2003

Myralyn “Mimi” Nartey (née Osei-Agyemang, born 5 November 1981) is an American-born Ghanaian former footballer who played as a forward. She has represented the Ghana women's national team.

== International career ==
Although raised in Portland, Oregon, she qualified to represent Ghana through her father, Simon Osei-Agyemang. She made her international debut in 1998, aged 16, and became the first one who was born outside Ghana. She was part of the team at the 2003 FIFA Women's World Cup.

== Personal life ==
She currently lives in Playa Vista, Los Angeles with her husband Kofi Nartey and their two children. Her younger sister, Candice Osei-Agyemang, represented Ghana at the 2012 FIFA U-20 Women's World Cup.
