= Dignity Health Sports Park =

Sports complex and stadium in Carson, California, United States

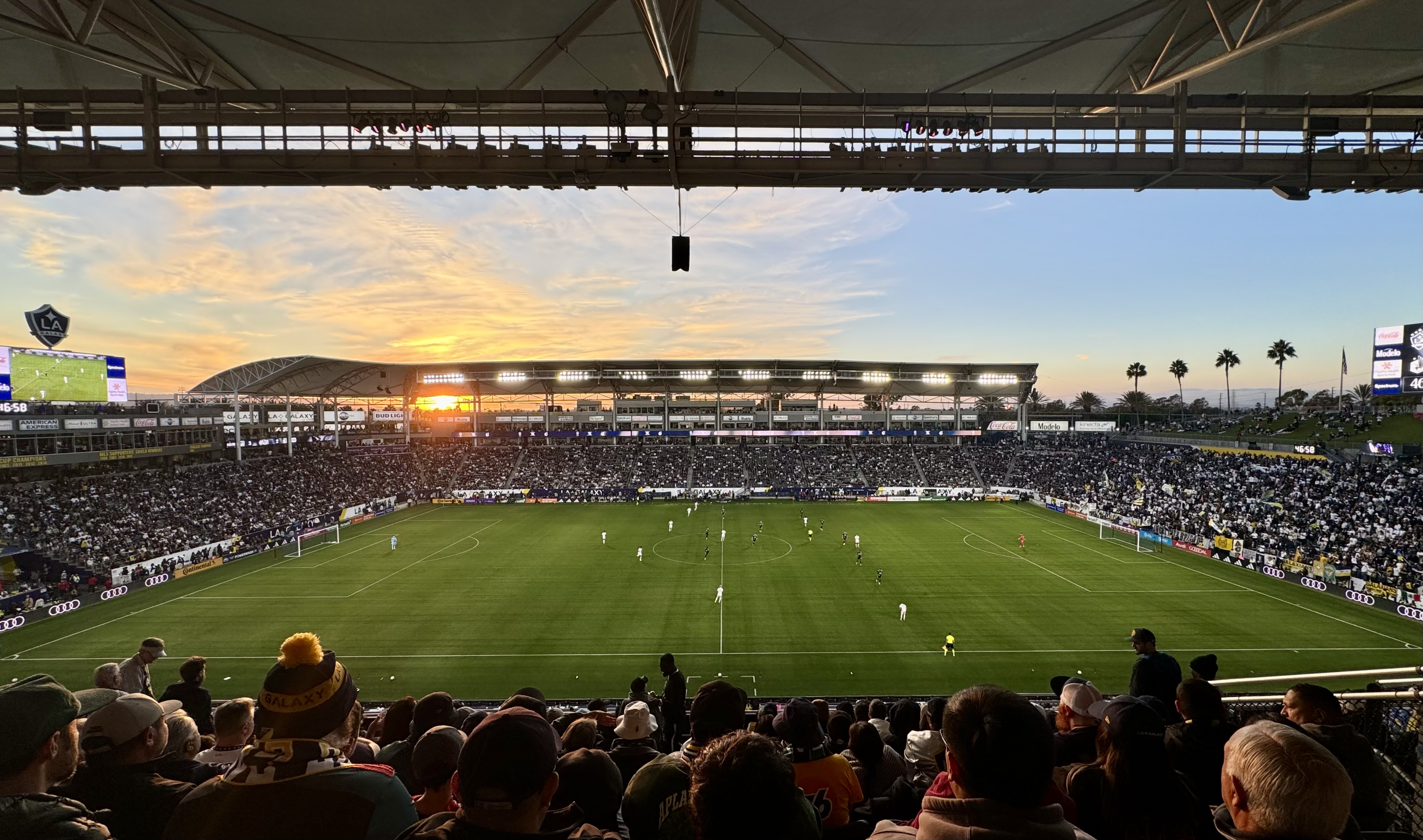

- Location in the Greater Los Angeles area Location in California Location in the United States Location in North America
- Interactive map of Dignity Health Sports Park
- Former names: Home Depot Center (2003–2013); StubHub Center (2013–2018)
- Address: 18400 Avalon Boulevard
- Location: Carson, California, U.S.
- Coordinates: 33.864°N 118.261°W
- Owner: Anschutz Entertainment Group
- Capacity: 27,000
- Surface: Bandera Bermuda Grass
- Field size: 120 yd × 75 yd (110 m × 69 m)
- Public transit: Galaxy Express to/from: Del Amo; Harbor Gateway Transit Center

Construction
- Groundbreaking: February 26, 2002; 24 years ago
- Opened: June 1, 2003; 23 years ago
- Cost: US$150 million; soccer stadium-only costs within the complex were around US$87 million
- Architect: Rossetti Architects
- Structural engineers: John A. Martin & Associates, Inc.
- Services engineers: AG Engineering Group, Inc.
- General contractor: PCL Construction

Tenants
- LA Galaxy (MLS) (2003–present); Chivas USA (MLS) (2005–2014); Los Angeles Riptide (MLL) (2006–2008); Los Angeles Sol (WPS) (2009); Ventura County FC (MLS Next Pro) (2015–2024); Los Angeles Chargers (NFL) (2017–2019); Los Angeles Wildcats (XFL) (2020); San Diego State Aztecs (NCAA) (2020–2021); RFC LA (MLR) (2024)

Dignity Health Sports Park is a multi-use sports complex located on the campus of California State University, Dominguez Hills, in Carson, California, United States. The complex consists of the 27,000-seat Dignity Health Sports Park soccer stadium, the Dignity Health Sports Park tennis stadium, a track-and-field facility, and the VELO Sports Center velodrome. It is approximately 14 miles (23 km) south of downtown Los Angeles, and its primary tenant is the LA Galaxy of Major League Soccer (MLS). The main stadium was also home to the Los Angeles Wildcats of the XFL in 2020. The LA Galaxy II of MLS Next Pro play their home matches at the complex's track and field facility. For the 2017 to 2019 seasons, the stadium served as the temporary home of the Los Angeles Chargers NFL team. For 2020 and 2021, the stadium served as the temporary home of the San Diego State Aztecs football team.

Opened in 2003, the $150 million complex was developed and is operated by the Anschutz Entertainment Group. With a seating capacity of 27,000, it is the second largest soccer-specific stadium in the United States, after Geodis Park in Nashville, Tennessee, and the third-largest among its kind in MLS, after Geodis Park and BMO Field in Toronto. During its first decade, the stadium was known as Home Depot Center through a naming rights deal with hardware retailer the Home Depot. In 2013, the name was changed to StubHub Center after naming rights were sold to online ticket marketplace StubHub. The current name, from healthcare provider Dignity Health, debuted in 2019.

In addition to hosting LA Galaxy games since its opening, the stadium also served as the home of the now-defunct Chivas USA MLS team from 2005 to 2014. The stadium was the temporary home of the Los Angeles Chargers of the National Football League (NFL) from 2017 to 2019, being the smallest NFL stadium over the course of those three seasons. When the Chargers played at the stadium, the facility was known as ROKiT Field at StubHub Center as part of a "multi-year" agreement with ROKiT.

== History and facilities ==
Originally opened as Home Depot Center in 2003, it was renamed StubHub Center on June 1, 2013. It became Dignity Health Sports Park on January 1, 2019, after California-based Dignity Health signed a new naming rights agreement.

The 27,000-seat main stadium was the second American sports arena designed specifically for soccer in the MLS era. When the venue opened in June 2003 as the new home of LA Galaxy, a number of special events took place in celebration. Pelé was in attendance at the opening match along with many dignitaries from the soccer world and other celebrities.

In addition to the soccer stadium, Dignity Health Sports Park features the 2,450-seat VELO Sports Center (velodrome), an 8,000-seat tennis stadium, and an outdoor track and field facility that has 2,000 permanent seats and is expandable to 20,000. Soccer stadium building costs within the $150 million complex were around $87 million.

=== 2017 renovations ===
The Los Angeles Chargers funded a $10 million renovation to the stadium in 2017 to prepare for their temporary tenancy. The capacity was increased by 1,000 seats by adding bleachers to the northern grass berm and in two corner sections. A concession area with food trucks and portable restrooms was added to the north side, while stands in the adjacent tennis stadium were opened for use. The luxury suites and press box were also renovated to add capacity.

Two new radio booths were built outside the south side of the press box, and a large new booth on the north side to serve as a security command post for police and NFL officials was constructed. Two booths were added on each side of the press box for the NFL-mandated 20-yard-line television cameras, and a stairway allowing access to the roof of the main box was built to accommodate the 50-yard-line camera. To accommodate 53-man NFL rosters, four small locker rooms were converted to two larger ones with 60 cubicles in each. Also added were small postgame news conference rooms for each team and rooms for game officials and the chain gang. After the Chargers left for Inglewood, the football facilities were taken over by the Wildcats when the XFL team began operations in 2020.

== Soccer ==
Aside from being home to the LA Galaxy of Major League Soccer, it was also home to two defunct clubs, the MLS team Chivas USA as well as Los Angeles Sol of Women's Professional Soccer. The stadium hosted the 2003 MLS All-Star Game and the MLS Cup in 2003, 2004, 2008, 2011, 2012, 2014, and 2024. Four of these finals involve the LA Galaxy as the host, all saw them having a better regular season record against their Eastern Conference opponent; three of which came after the rule change in 2012 MLS rules change which did away with a neutral site for the Final, and instead has the club with the best overall regular-season record hosting the match.

Dignity Health Sports Park was also the site of the 2003 FIFA Women's World Cup final. Both the United States women's and men's national football teams often use the facility for training camps and select home matches.

It also hosted the 2004 NCAA Men's College Cup, with Duke, Indiana, Maryland, and UC Santa Barbara qualifying.

The track and field stadium on the site is the former home to LA Galaxy II of MLS Next Pro, the developmental club to the parent LA Galaxy. Starting in 2024, this team has moved and will be known as Ventura County FC.

On July 30, 2016, it hosted a 2016 International Champions Cup match between Paris Saint-Germain and Leicester City. Paris Saint-Germain won the match 4–0 to complete a perfect record in the ICC.

On July 24, 2024, it hosted a friendly match between Premier League sides Arsenal and Bournemouth in a 1–1 draw with Arsenal winning the match on penalties.

=== 2003 FIFA Women's World Cup ===
Date	Tournament	Winning team	Result	Losing team	Attendance
September 21, 2003	2003 FIFA Women's World Cup Group D	Russia	2–1	Australia	8,500
September 21, 2003	2003 FIFA Women's World Cup Group D	China	1–0	Ghana	10,027
September 25, 2003	2003 FIFA Women's World Cup Group D	China	1–1	Australia	13,929
September 25, 2003	2003 FIFA Women's World Cup Group D	Russia	3–0	Ghana	13,929
October 11, 2003	2003 FIFA Women's World Cup Third place	United States	3–1	Canada	25,253
October 12, 2003	2003 FIFA Women's World Cup Final	Germany	1–0 (a.e.t.)	Sweden	26,137

=== 2011 CONCACAF Gold Cup ===
Date	Tournament	Winning team	Result	Losing team	Attendance
June 6, 2011	Group B	Jamaica	4–0	Grenada	21,507
June 6, 2011	Group B	Honduras	0–0	Guatemala	21,507

=== 2015 CONCACAF Gold Cup ===
Date	Tournament	Winning team	Result	Losing team	Attendance
July 8, 2015	Group B	Costa Rica	2–2	Jamaica	22,648
July 8, 2015	Group B	El Salvador	0–0	Canada	22,648

=== 2025 CONCACAF Gold Cup ===
Date	Tournament	Winning team	Result	Losing team	Attendance
June 16, 2025	Group C	Panama	5–2	Guadeloupe	18,262
June 16, 2025	Group C	Guatemala	1–0	Jamaica	18,262

=== International women's football matches ===
Date	Tournament	Winning team	Result	Losing team	Attendance
December 8, 2004	International friendly	United States	5–0	Mexico	15,549
July 24, 2005	International friendly	United States	3–0	Iceland	4,378
October 1, 2006	International friendly	United States	10–0	Chinese Taipei	5,479
August 25, 2007	International friendly	United States	4–0	Finland	7,118
December 13, 2008	International friendly	United States	1–0	China	3,619
September 16, 2012	International friendly	United States	2–1	Australia	19,851
May 17, 2015	International friendly	United States	5–1	Mexico	27,000
November 13, 2016	International friendly	United States	5–0	Romania	20,336
August 3, 2017	2017 Tournament of Nations	Australia	6–1	Brazil	11,948
August 3, 2017	2017 Tournament of Nations	United States	3–0	Japan	23,161
August 31, 2018	International friendly	United States	3–0	Chile	23,544
February 7, 2020	CONCACAF Women's Olympic Qualifying	Canada	1–0	Costa Rica	11,292
February 7, 2020	CONCACAF Women's Olympic Qualifying	United States	4–0	Mexico	11,292
February 9, 2020	CONCACAF Women's Olympic Qualifying	United States	3–0	Canada	17,489
February 17, 2022	2022 SheBelieves Cup	Iceland	1–0	New Zealand	2,078
February 17, 2022	2022 SheBelieves Cup	United States	0–0	Czech Republic	7,333
February 20, 2022	2022 SheBelieves Cup	United States	5–0	New Zealand	16,587
February 20, 2022	2022 SheBelieves Cup	Iceland	2–1	Czech Republic	3,577
September 2, 2022	International friendly	New Zealand	1–0	Mexico	
February 20, 2024	2024 CONCACAF W Gold Cup	United States	5–0	Dominican Republic	3,242
February 20, 2024	2024 CONCACAF W Gold Cup	Mexico	0–0	Argentina	2,521
February 23, 2024	2024 CONCACAF W Gold Cup	Mexico	8–0	Dominican Republic	
February 23, 2024	2024 CONCACAF W Gold Cup	United States	4–0	Argentina	8,315
February 26, 2024	2024 CONCACAF W Gold Cup	Argentina	3–0	Dominican Republic	
February 26, 2024	2024 CONCACAF W Gold Cup	Mexico	2–0	United States	
January 24, 2026	International friendly	United States	6–0	Paraguay	19,397

=== MLS Cup ===
Date	Winning team	Result	Losing team	Attendance	Ref.
November 23, 2003	(United States) (California) San Jose Earthquakes	4–2	(United States) (Illinois) Chicago Fire	27,000	
November 14, 2004	(United States) (Washington, D.C.) D.C. United	3–2	(United States) (Missouri) Kansas City Wizards	25,797	
November 23, 2008	(United States) (Ohio) Columbus Crew	3–1	(United States) (New Jersey) New York Red Bulls	27,000	
November 20, 2011	(United States) (California) Los Angeles Galaxy	1–0	(United States) (Texas) Houston Dynamo	30,281	
December 1, 2012	(United States) (California) Los Angeles Galaxy	3–1	(United States) (Texas) Houston Dynamo	30,510	
December 7, 2014	(United States) (California) Los Angeles Galaxy	2–1 (AET)	(United States) (Massachusetts) New England Revolution	27,000	
December 7, 2024	(United States) (California) Los Angeles Galaxy	2–1	(United States) (New Jersey) New York Red Bulls	26,812	

== Other international matches ==
=== Rugby ===
The stadium hosted the first three editions (2004–06) of the USA Sevens, an annual international rugby sevens competition that is part of the World Rugby Sevens Series. It again hosted the 2020, 2022, and 2023 events.

The stadium has also hosted all United States national team matches for the Pacific Nations Cup between 2013 and 2014. and the "Quest For Gold" pre-Olympic Rugby Sevens showcase on June 25–26, 2021.

The stadium hosted the Los Angeles Rugby Team of Major League Rugby for the 2024 season.

The stadium is scheduled to host the 2028 Olympic Rugby Sevens tournaments.

=== USA Eagles Internationals ===
USA scores displayed first.

Date	Opponents	Final score	Competition	Attendance	Ref.
June 14, 2013	Tonga	9–18	2013 IRB Pacific Nations Cup	6,000	
June 14, 2014	Japan	29–37	2014 IRB Pacific Nations Cup	5,100	
February 3, 2014	Argentina XV	17–10	2018 Americas Rugby Championship	6,500	
August 31, 2024	Canada	28–15	2024 World Rugby Pacific Nations Cup		

=== Champion of Champions Liga MX competition ===
Date	Winning team	Result	Losing team	Attendance
July 10, 2016	(Mexico) (Nuevo León) Tigres UANL	1–0	(Mexico) (Hidalgo (state)) C.F. Pachuca	27,132
July 16, 2017	(Mexico) (Nuevo León) Tigres UANL	1–0	(Mexico) (Jalisco) C.D. Guadalajara	25,667
July 15, 2018	(Mexico) (Nuevo León) Tigres UANL	4–0	(Mexico) (Coahuila) Santos Laguna	13,917
July 14, 2019	(Mexico) (Mexico City) Club América	0–0	(Mexico) (Nuevo León) Tigres UANL	27,800
July 18, 2021	(Mexico) (Mexico City) Cruz Azul	2–1	(Mexico) (Guanajuato) Club León	27,674

== Other sports ==
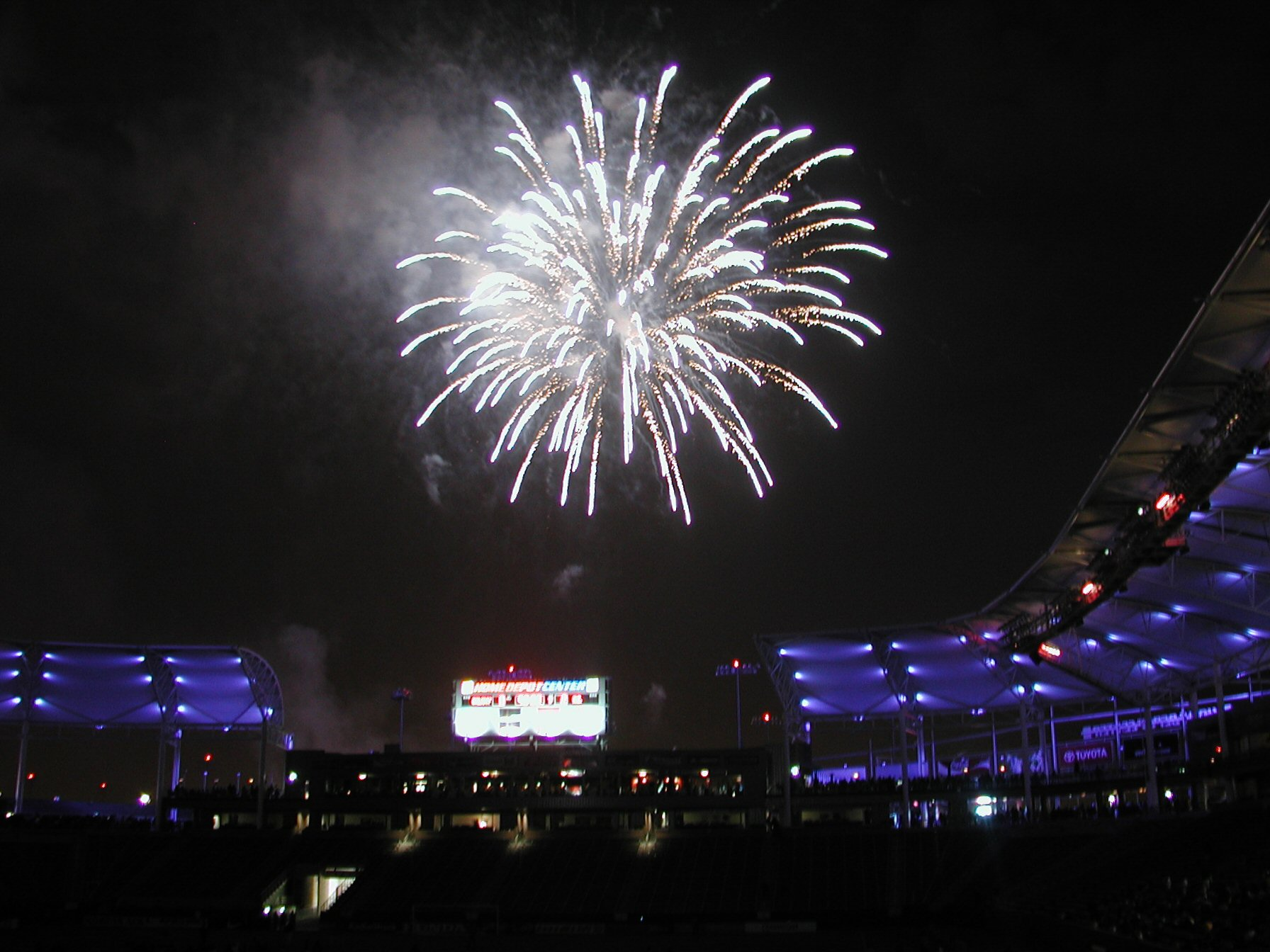
A fireworks display at Dignity Health Sports Park

It was also the location for the State Championship Bowl Games for high school football teams in the state of California from 2006 to 2014. The Semper Fidelis All America game was held there on January 5, 2014, featuring an East vs West high school matchup. The first college football game was held at the stadium on January 21, 2012, as the AstroTurf NFLPA Collegiate Bowl, with the National Team beating the American Team 20–14.

The track played host to the 2005 USA Outdoor Track and Field Championships. It is also the home of the Adidas Running Club, a member of the USA Elite Running Circuit, and the Adidas Track Classic. Dignity Health Sports Park is also home to EXOS, formerly Athletes' Performance, which trains athletes in a variety of sports.

The Los Angeles Riptide of Major League Lacrosse played their home games at the track and field stadium.

The soccer and tennis stadiums of the Center have also served as the main venues for ESPN's Summer X Games.

From 2010 to 2016, it hosted the Reebok CrossFit Games. Initially only utilizing the tennis stadium, over the years it also expanded to the running field and the soccer stadium.

The facility has also hosted several high-profile professional boxing matches, including Andre Ward vs. Arthur Abraham, Brandon Ríos vs. Urbano Antillón, Shawn Porter vs. Kell Brook and matches featuring other notable fighters. The venue has become iconic among boxing fans for its electric atmosphere.

On August 16, 2013, Resurrection Fighting Alliance held an MMA event titled RFA 9: Curran vs. Munhoz, with the main event crowning a new Bantamweight Champion.

=== Los Angeles Chargers ===
The Los Angeles Chargers had a three–year tenure at Dignity Health Sports Park from 2017 to 2019, while SoFi Stadium in Inglewood was being built. During the team's three seasons at the stadium, they compiled an even 12–12 record. Chargers fans were outnumbered by opposing teams' supporters, who frequently filled much of the stadium.

=== San Diego State Aztecs ===
The stadium served as the temporary home of the San Diego State Aztecs football team from San Diego State University. The 2020 and 2021 seasons were played at Dignity Health Sports Park until Snapdragon Stadium in San Diego, the replacement for the Aztecs' former home of San Diego Stadium, was completed in time for the 2022 season. The final Aztecs game held at the stadium was the 2021 Mountain West Conference Football Championship Game, a 46–13 loss by the Aztecs to the Utah State Aggies. During the team's two seasons at the stadium, they compiled a 9–3 record (3–1 in 2020 and 6–2 in 2021).

=== 2028 Summer Olympics and Paralympics ===
During the 2028 Summer Olympics, the venue will host archery, rugby, tennis, field hockey, and track cycling and will be known as Carson Stadium. The venue will also host archery during the 2028 Summer Paralympics.

In 2017, the venue was initially announced as the venue for modern pentathlon as well, but the organizers' July 2024 announcement of revised venue allocations did not indicate any assignment for this sport as it was being evaluated by the IOC. It was eventually confirmed to be held at Sepulveda Basin.

== Entertainment ==
=== Concerts ===
The Vans Warped Tour was held annually in the stadium parking lot until the tour's final year in 2018.

It also served as the host facility for the first two seasons of Spike TV's Pros vs Joes reality sports contests.

In 2007, the stadium hosted the bands Héroes del Silencio, on their 2007 Reunion Tour, and Soda Stereo on their Me Verás Volver tour.

In 2023, ENHYPEN played a show at the stadium on October 6.

=== In film and TV ===
The facility is available to rent as background location for film, television and advertising. The complex was the site for the third season of the CBS reality competition Tough as Nails. The sports park was the site of the final task and finish line of 33rd season of The Amazing Race.

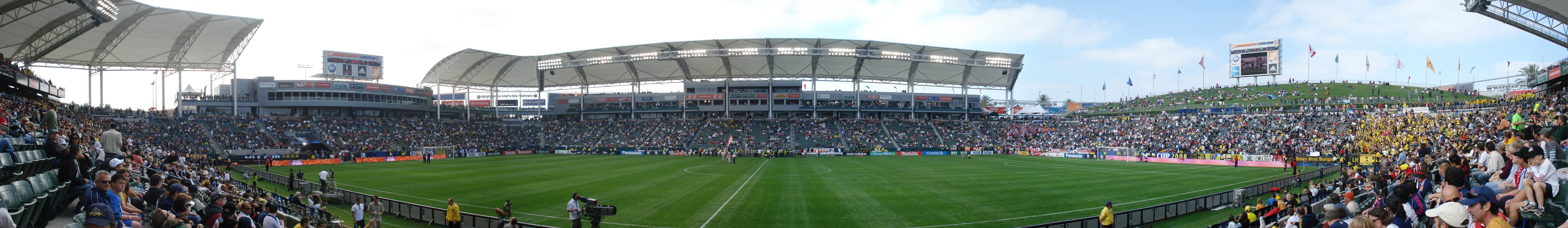
Panoramic view of the then-Home Depot Center during the MLS Cup 2008

== Transportation ==
Dignity Health Sports Park is located south of the Avalon Boulevard exit on California State Route 91.

In 2017, the LA Galaxy launched a shuttle bus service operated by Long Beach Transit. With two routes connecting Dignity Health Sports Park with the Harbor Gateway Transit Center and Del Amo station on the Los Angeles Metro Rail's A Line.

Events and tenants
Preceded by Qualcomm Stadium	Home of the Los Angeles Chargers; 2017–2019	Succeeded by SoFi Stadium
Preceded by Rose Bowl	Home of the LA Galaxy; 2003–present	Incumbent
Preceded by First stadium	Home of Chivas USA; 2005–2014	Succeeded by Team dissolved
Preceded by Aloha Stadium	Host of the Pan-Pacific Championship; 2009–present	Incumbent
Preceded by Gillette Stadium; RFK Stadium; BMO Field; Sporting Park	Host of the MLS Cup; 2003 & 2004; 2008; 2011 & 2012; 2014	Succeeded by Pizza Hut Park; Qwest Field; Sporting Park; Mapfre Stadium
Preceded by Rose Bowl; Pasadena	FIFA Women's World Cup; Final Venue; 2003	Succeeded by Hongkou Stadium; Shanghai
Preceded by Nickerson Field	Host of Major League Lacrosse championship weekend 2006	Succeeded by PAETEC Park
Preceded by First stadium Sam Boyd Stadium	Home of USA Sevens; 2004–2006; 2020; 2022–2025	Succeeded by Petco Park; Sports Illustrated Stadium
Preceded by Columbus Crew Stadium	Host of the College Cup; 2004	Succeeded by SAS Soccer Park
