= Alexandra Svetlitskaya =

Russian footballer (1971–2019)

Personal information
- Full name: Alexandra Svetlitskaya
- Date of birth: 20 August 1971
- Place of birth: Alma-Ata, Kazakh SSR, Soviet Union
- Date of death: 23 January 2019 (aged 47)
- Place of death: Almaty, Kazakhstan
- Height: 1.61 m (5 ft 3 in)
- Position: Midfielder

Senior career*
Years	Team	Apps	(Gls)
1992–1996	CSK VVS Samara	??	(46)
1997–2001	Lada Togliatti		
2002–2003	Energiya Voronezh		
2004	Alma-KTZh		

International career
	Russia	??	(9)

Managerial career
- Kazakhstan U19
- * Club domestic league appearances and goals

Alexandra Svetlitskaya (20 August 1971 – 23 January 2019) was a Russian footballer who played as a midfielder who represented Russia in the 1999 and 2003 World Cups.

She scored an equalizer against England in the 2001 European Championship.
