= Tatiana Egorova =

Russian footballer and manager

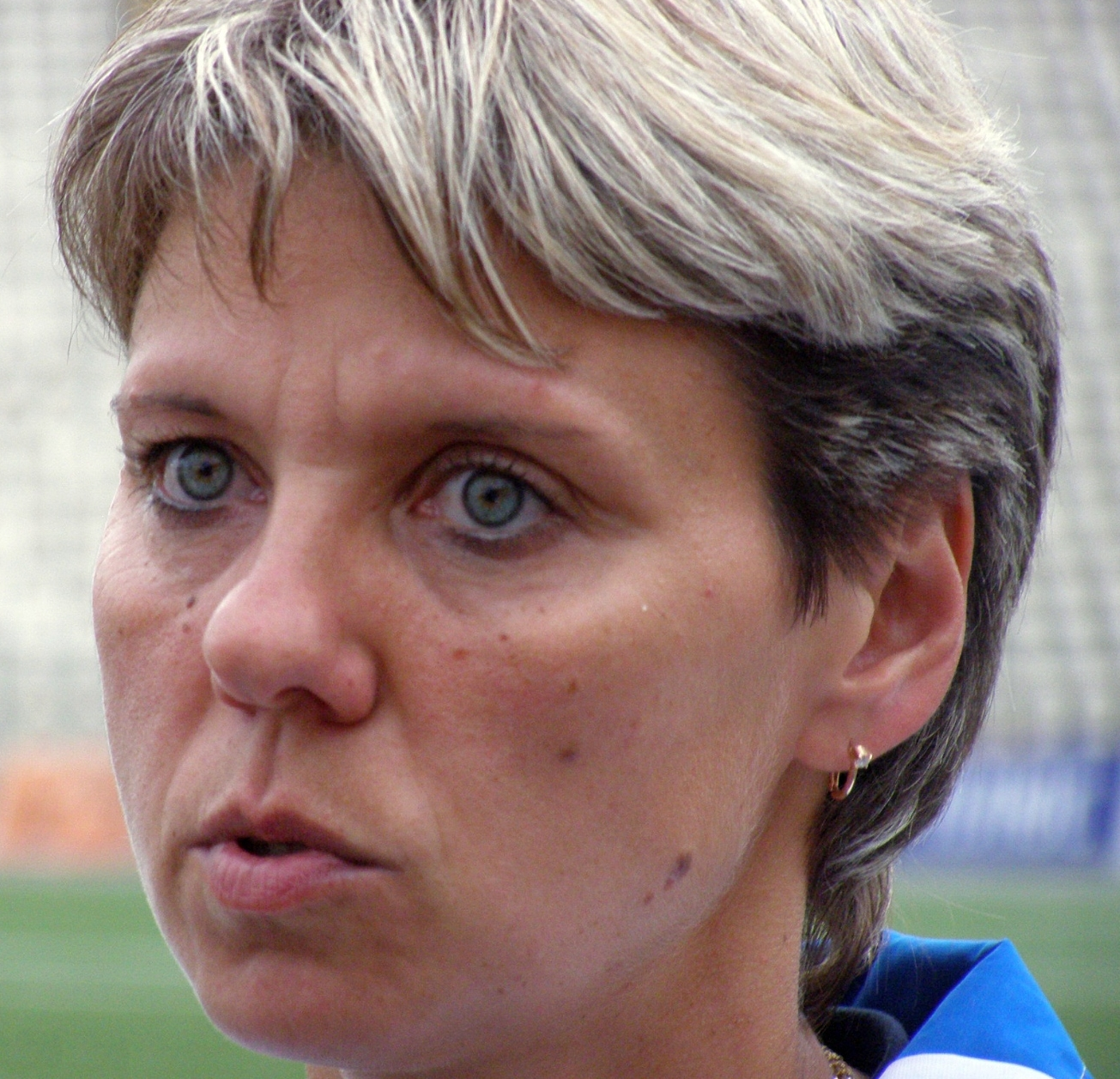
- As head coach of Rossiyanka in 2010

Personal information
- Full name: Tatiana Vladimirovna Egorova
- Date of birth: 10 March 1970
- Place of birth: Soviet Union
- Date of death: 29 July 2012 (aged 42)
- Place of death: Moscow, Russia
- Height: 1.76 m (5 ft 9 in)
- Position: Midfielder

Senior career*
Years	Team	Apps	(Gls)
1992–1994	CSK VVS Samara		
1994–1996	Turbine Potsdam		
1996–2004	CSK VVS Samara		
2005–2006	Rossiyanka		

International career
1992–2005	Russia		

Managerial career
- 2010–2011: Rossiyanka
- * Club domestic league appearances and goals

Tatiana Egorova (10 March 1970 – 29 July 2012) was a Russian footballer and manager. She played for CSK VVS Samara and Rossiyanka in the Russian Championship, and Turbine Potsdam in the German Bundesliga, and she was a member of the Russian national team, with whom she played the 1999 and 2003 World Cups.

She served as Rossiyanka's manager in 2010 and 2011, winning Rossiyanka's third double. Despite qualifying Rossiyanka for the 2012 Champions League quarter-finals she was sacked in January 2012.

Egorova died in Moscow on 29 July 2012 at the age of 42. The cause of her death was not disclosed by the media.

== Titles ==
as a player:

- 6 Russian Leagues (1993, 1994, 1996, 2001, 2005, 2006)
- 3 Russian Cups (1994, 2005, 2006)

as a coach:

- 1 Russian League (2010)
- 1 Russian Cup (2010)
