= Bai Jie =

Chinese footballer (born 1972)

Personal information
- Date of birth: 28 March 1972 (age 54)
- Place of birth: Zhangjiakou, Hebei, China
- Height: 5 ft 4 in (1.63 m)

Youth career
- Hebei Youth and Teenagers Sports School

Senior career*
Years	Team	Apps	(Gls)
- Guangzhou Army
2001–2002	Washington Freedom		

International career
1997–2003	China	139	
Medal record
Women's football
Representing China
Asian Games
Gold medal – first place	1998 Bangkok	Team
Silver medal – second place	2002 Busan	Team
- * Club domestic league appearances and goals

Bai Jie (simplified Chinese: 白洁; traditional Chinese: 白潔; pinyin: Bái Jié; born 28 March 1972) is a Chinese footballer who made 139 appearances for the China women's national football team and was part of their second-place performance at the 1999 FIFA Women's World Cup. Bai initially played left back and was dubbed "Lady Roberto Carlos" for her similar style of play, but was later moved into an attacking role on the national team.

Bai Jie was named the first AFC Women's Player of the Year in 2003. That year on 11 June, in a World Cup qualifying game, Bai scored five goals in China's 12–0 win over India. Teammate Sun Wen also tallied five goals.

== International goals ==
No.	Date	Venue	Opponent	Score	Result	Competition
1.	9 September 2001	Chicago, United States	Japan	1–0	3–0	2001 Women's U.S. Cup
2.	7 October 2002	Busan, South Korea	Vietnam	4–1	4–1	2002 Asian Games
3.	9 October 2002	Changwon, South Korea	Japan	1–2	2–2	2002 Asian Games
4.	9 October 2002	Changwon, South Korea	Japan	2–2	2–2	2002 Asian Games
5.	11 June 2003	Nakhon Sawan, Thailand	India	1–0	12–0	2003 AFC Women's Championship
6.	11 June 2003	Nakhon Sawan, Thailand	India	2–0	12–0	2003 AFC Women's Championship
7.	11 June 2003	Nakhon Sawan, Thailand	India	4–0	12–0	2003 AFC Women's Championship
8.	11 June 2003	Nakhon Sawan, Thailand	India	9–0	12–0	2003 AFC Women's Championship
9.	11 June 2003	Nakhon Sawan, Thailand	India	10–0	12–0	2003 AFC Women's Championship
10.	19 June 2003	Bangkok, Thailand	South Korea	1–0	3–1	2003 AFC Women's Championship
11.	19 June 2003	Bangkok, Thailand	South Korea	2–0	3–1	2003 AFC Women's Championship
