= Marina Burakova =

Russian footballer (born 1966)

Personal information
- Date of birth: 8 May 1966 (age 60)
- Place of birth: Smolensk, Soviet Union
- Position: Defender

International career^{‡}
Years	Team	Apps	(Gls)
1992–2003	Russia	120	
- ‡ National team caps and goals as of 4 October 2003

Marina Burakova (Russian: Марина Буракова; born 8 May 1966) is a former Russian women's international footballer who played as a defender. She was a member of the Russia women's national football team. She was part of the team at the 1999 FIFA Women's World Cup and 2003 FIFA Women's World Cup where she was the team captain.
