= Ma Liangxing =

Chinese football manager

Personal information
- Date of birth: 29 November 1957 (age 68)

Managerial career
- Years: Team
- China Women

Ma Liangxing (Chinese: 马良行; pinyin: Mǎ Liángxíng; born 29 November 1957) is a Chinese football manager.

== Career ==
Ma was the head coach of the China women's national team at the 2003 FIFA Women's World Cup.
