= Alla Volkova =

Russian footballer

Personal information
- Date of birth: 12 April 1968 (age 58)
- Height: 1.77 m (5 ft 10 in)
- Position: Goalkeeper

International career
Years	Team	Apps	(Gls)
- Russia

Alla Volkova (born 1968) is a Russian former footballer who played as a goalkeeper.

Volkova played during the 1999 and 2003 FIFA Women's World Cup.
