= Ren Liping =

Chinese footballer

Medal record

Women's football

Representing China

Asian Games
Silver medal – second place	2002 Busan	Team
Bronze medal – third place	2006 Doha	Team

Ren Liping (simplified Chinese: 任丽萍; traditional Chinese: 任麗萍; pinyin: Rén Lìpíng; born October 21, 1978, in Beijing) is a female Chinese football (soccer) player who competed at the 2004 Summer Olympics.

In 2004, she finished ninth with the Chinese team in the women's tournament. She played both matches.

== International goals ==
No.	Date	Venue	Opponent	Score	Result	Competition
1.	7 October 2002	Busan Gudeok Stadium, Busan, South Korea	Vietnam	1–0	4–1	2002 Asian Games
2.	7 October 2002	Busan Gudeok Stadium, Busan, South Korea	Vietnam	3–1	4–1	2002 Asian Games
3.	11 October 2002	Changwon Stadium, Changwon, South Korea	South Korea	3–0	4–0	2002 Asian Games
4.	13 June 2003	Nakhon Sawan Province Stadium, Nakhon Sawan, Thailand	Uzbekistan	3–0	11–0	2003 AFC Women's Championship
5.	13 June 2003	Nakhon Sawan Province Stadium, Nakhon Sawan, Thailand	Uzbekistan	10–0	11–0	2003 AFC Women's Championship
6.	18 April 2004	Hiroshima Stadium, Hiroshima, Japan	Myanmar	7–0	11–0	2004 Summer Olympics qualification
7.	4 December 2006	Thani bin Jassim Stadium, Al-Rayyan, Qatar	Jordan	3–0	12–0	2006 Asian Games
8.	4 December 2006	Thani bin Jassim Stadium, Al-Rayyan, Qatar	Jordan	6–0	12–0	2006 Asian Games
