= Marina Saenko =

Russian footballer (born 1975)

Personal information
- Full name: Marina Petrovna Saenko (Dikareva)
- Date of birth: May 1, 1975 (age 51)
- Place of birth: Ruzayevka, Russian SFSR
- Height: 1.70 m (5 ft 7 in)
- Position: Defender

Senior career*
Years	Team	Apps	(Gls)
- Vizit Sarank
- Sibiryachka Krasnoyarsk
1998–2012	Energiya Voronezh		

International career
1996–2005	Russia		
- * Club domestic league appearances and goals

Marina Petrovna Saenko (Russian: Марина Петровна Саенко; née Dikareva [Дикарева]; born May 1, 1975) is a former Russian football defender well known for playing for Energiya Voronezh in the Russian Championship

She has been a member of the Russian national team. She was named the MVP of Russia's 3-0 win over Ghana in the 2003 World Cup, where she scored one goal.
