= Wang Liping (footballer) =

Chinese footballer (born 1973)

Personal information
- Full name: Wang Liping
- Date of birth: 12 November 1973 (age 52)
- Place of birth: Baoding, China
- Height: 1.62 m (5 ft 4 in)
- Positions: Defender; midfielder

Senior career*
Years	Team	Apps	(Gls)
–2001	Hebei FC		
2002	Atlanta Beat	14	(1)
2003–200?	Hebei FC		

International career
1992–2004	China	162	
Medal record
Women's football
Representing China
Olympic Games
Silver medal – second place	1996 Atlanta	Team
Asian Games
Gold medal – first place	1994 Hiroshima	Team
Gold medal – first place	1998 Bangkok	Team
FIFA Women's World Cup
Runner-up	1999 United States
- * Club domestic league appearances and goals

Wang Liping (simplified Chinese: 王丽萍; traditional Chinese: 王麗萍; pinyin: Wáng Lìpíng; born 12 November 1973) is a Chinese former footballer who played as a defender or midfielder. She competed in the 1996, 2000 and 2004 Summer Olympics.

In 1996 she won the silver medal with the Chinese team. She played all five matches.

Four years later she finished fifth with the Chinese team in the women's tournament. She played all three matches.

In 2004, she finished ninth with the Chinese team in the 2004 women's tournament. She played both matches.

She played for the Atlanta Beat in the Women's United Soccer Association in 2002.

== See also ==
- List of women's footballers with 100 or more international caps
