= Liu Yali (footballer) =

Chinese footballer

Medal record

Women's football

Representing China

Asian Games
Silver medal – second place	2002 Busan	Team
Bronze medal – third place	2006 Doha	Team

Liu Yali (simplified Chinese: 刘亚莉; traditional Chinese: 劉亞莉; pinyin: Liú Yàlì; born February 9, 1980, in Zhangjiakou, Hebei) is a female Chinese football (soccer) player who competed at the 2004 Summer Olympics.

In 2004, she was a squad member of the Chinese team which finished ninth in the women's tournament.
