= Yuri Bystritsky =

Russian football manager

Personal information
- Full name: Yuri Vladimirovich Bystritsky
- Date of birth: 31 July 1944 (age 82)

Managerial career
- Years: Team
- Russia Women

Yuri Vladimirovich Bystritsky (Russian: Юрий Владимирович Быстрицкий; born 31 July 1944) is a Russian football manager.

== Career ==
Bystritsky was the head coach of the Russia women's national team at the 1999 FIFA Women's World Cup and 2003 FIFA Women's World Cup.
